= 1970 Mexican Segunda División season =

Segunda División de México
- Season: México 1970
- Champions: Unión de Curtidores (1st Title)
- Matches played: 178
- Goals scored: 640 (3.6 per match)

The México 1970 Segunda División was the 21st season of the Mexican Segunda División. The season started on 5 March 1970 and concluded on 11 October 1970. It was won by Unión de Curtidores. It was a special tournament held as part of the celebrations of the 1970 FIFA World Cup, which was hosted by Mexico.

The Mexican Football Federation held a tournament in two phases, before the world cup (Mar. 5 - May 10) and after the world cup (July 11 - Oct. 10).

Seventeen teams were seeded in three groups of five or six teams: North, Central and West, first three or two places of each group advanced to the "Championship Group" and the last two or three teams of each group played in a "Consolation Group".

== Changes ==
- Celaya was dissolved at the end of 1969–70 season.
- Poza Rica was dissolved between first and second phase of the México 1970 season.
- U. de N.L. was renamed as UANL.

== Teams ==
México 1970 Teams

Club	City	Stadium
La Piedad	La Piedad	Estadio Juan N. López
Ciudad Madero	Ciudad Madero	Estadio Tamaulipas
Morelia	Morelia	Estadio Venustiano Carranza
Nacional	Guadalajara	Estadio Jalisco
Naucalpan	Naucalpan	Unidad Cuauhtémoc
Nuevo León	Monterrey	Estadio Tecnológico
Poza Rica	Poza Rica	Estadio Heriberto Jara Corona
Puebla	Puebla	Estadio Cuauhtémoc
Salamanca	Salamanca	Estadio El Molinito
Tampico	Tampico	Estadio Tamaulipas
Tepic	Tepic	Estadio Nicolás Álvarez Ortega
Unión de Curtidores	León	Estadio La Martinica
UANL	Monterrey	Estadio Universitario
Ciudad Victoria	Ciudad Victoria	Estadio Marte R. Gómez
Zacatepec	Zacatepec	Estadio Agustín "Coruco" Díaz
Zamora	Zamora	Estadio Moctezuma
Zapata	Jojutla	Estadio Agustín "Coruco" Díaz

== First stage ==
=== Central Group ===
Pos	Team	Pld	W	D	L	GF	GA	GD	Pts	Promotion	ZAC	NAU	PUE	SAL	ZAP
1	Zacatepec (Note: Zacatapec was placed at Consolation Group because the club was the champion of the 1969-70 season and had already won the promotion to Primera División)	8	6	0	2	17	5	+12	12			2–1	2–0	3–0	4–1
2	Naucalpan (Q)	8	6	0	2	19	11	+8	12	Qualified to Championship Group	1–0		3–4	2–1	4–1
3	Puebla (Q)	8	3	0	5	14	13	+1	6	Qualified to Championship Group	0–1	1–2		0–1	5–0
4	Salamanca	8	3	0	5	8	15	−7	6		2–1	1–4	1–0		0–2
5	Zapata	8	2	0	6	11	25	−14	4		0–4	1–2	3–4	3–2	

Source: RSSSF
Rules for classification: 1st points; 2nd head-to-head points; 3rd head-to-head goal difference; 4th head-to-head goals scored; 5th goal difference; 6th number of goals scored
(Q) Qualified for the phase indicated

=== West Group ===
Pos	Team	Pld	W	D	L	GF	GA	GD	Pts	Promotion	NAC	UDC	LPD	MOR	ZAM	TEP
1	Nacional (Q)	10	8	0	2	33	17	+16	16	Qualified to Championship Group		3–0	5–2	2–0	3–0	3–2
2	Unión de Curtidores (Q)	10	7	0	3	21	15	+6	14	Qualified to Championship Group	4–5		2–0	5–2	3–0	3–1
3	La Piedad (Q)	10	4	0	6	22	22	0	8	Qualified to Championship Group	5–2	3–0		2–0	1–2	3–2
4	Morelia	10	4	0	6	19	24	−5	8		2–3	3–0	2–1		1–0	2–0
5	Zamora	10	4	0	6	13	17	−4	8		1–0	0–1	1–2	4–2		4–2
6	Tepic	10	3	0	7	16	29	−13	6		0–4	0–1	3–2	6–5	2–1	

Source: RSSSF
Rules for classification: 1st points; 2nd head-to-head points; 3rd head-to-head goal difference; 4th head-to-head goals scored; 5th goal difference; 6th number of goals scored
(Q) Qualified for the phase indicated

=== North Group ===
Pos	Team	Pld	W	D	L	GF	GA	GD	Pts	Promotion	MAD	NVL	UNL	TAM	VIC	PZR
1	Ciudad Madero (Q)	10	7	0	3	15	9	+6	14	Qualified to Championship Group		0–2	2–0	4–0	2–1	2–1
2	Nuevo León (Q)	10	6	0	4	18	12	+6	12	Qualified to Championship Group	2–3		2–0	1–0	3–0	4–1
3	UANL (Q)	10	5	0	5	18	18	0	10	Qualified to Championship Group	2–0	2–3		1–0	4–3	2–1
4	Tampico (Note: Tampico was expelled from the tournament due to unpaid debts to the FMF)	10	5	0	5	14	15	−1	10		1–0	2–0	4–3		0–1	2–0
5	Ciudad Victoria	10	4	0	6	12	18	−6	8		0–1	2–1	1–4	1–0		2–1
6	Poza Rica (Note: Poza Rica was dissolved at the end of the First Stage)	10	3	0	7	14	19	−5	6		0–1	2–0	2–0	4–5	2–1	

Source: RSSSF
Rules for classification: 1st points; 2nd head-to-head points; 3rd head-to-head goal difference; 4th head-to-head goals scored; 5th goal difference; 6th number of goals scored
(Q) Qualified for the phase indicated

== Second stage ==
=== Championship Group ===
Pos	Team	Pld	W	D	L	GF	GA	GD	Pts	Promotion	UDC	PUE	NAC	UNL	MAD	NAU	LPD	NVL
1	Unión de Curtidores (C, Q)	14	11	0	3	32	13	+19	22	Qualified to Promotion playoff		4–1	4–1	4–1	0–1	2–1	2–1	5–1
2	Puebla (Q)	14	10	0	4	32	20	+12	20	Qualified to Promotion playoff	1–3		3–2	4–3	2–0	1–0	2–1	9–0
3	Nacional (Q)	14	9	0	5	39	26	+13	18	Qualified to Promotion playoff	1–3	1–2		5–2	2–0	3–0	3–2	5–3
4	UANL (Note: UANL resigned to play promotion playoff)	14	6	0	8	27	31	−4	12		1–2	3–2	3–4		1–2	0–2	4–1	3–2
5	Ciudad Madero (Note: Ciudad Madero was sanctioned not to play promotion playoffs for not showing up for a match)	13	6	0	7	11	18	−7	12		1–0	1–0	1–2	1–2			1–0	1–0
6	Naucalpan (Q)	13	5	0	8	15	24	−9	10	Qualified to Promotion playoff	1–2	0–1	0–3	0–1	3–1		3–2	1–0
7	La Piedad	14	5	0	9	25	23	+2	10		0–1	0–1	2–3	2–0	4–2	5–1		3–0
8	Nuevo León	14	3	0	11	14	40	−26	6		1–2	0–1	0–5	0–3	2–0	3–1	2–1	

Source: RSSSF
Rules for classification: 1st points; 2nd head-to-head points; 3rd head-to-head goal difference; 4th head-to-head goals scored; 5th goal difference; 6th number of goals scored
(C) Champions; (Q) Qualified for the phase indicated

=== Consolation Group ===
Pos	Team	Pld	W	D	L	GF	GA	GD	Pts	ZAC	TEP	SAL	ZAM	VIC	MOR	ZAP
1	Zacatepec	12	11	0	1	40	14	+26	22		5–0	2–1	1–0	3–0	5–4	2–1
2	Tepic	12	7	0	5	31	30	+1	14	3–6		0–1	1–0	3–0	3–2	3–0
3	Salamanca	12	7	0	5	21	21	0	14	2–5	2–1		3–4	1–0	3–1	1–0
4	Zamora	12	5	0	7	17	21	−4	10	0–2	1–0	3–4		2–0	1–2	2–1
5	Ciudad Victoria	12	4	0	8	20	25	−5	8	2–1	9–10	0–1	4–1		4–1	1–0
6	Morelia	12	4	0	8	22	30	−8	8	1–4	3–5	3–1	1–2	1–0		2–0
7	Zapata	12	4	0	8	10	20	−10	8	0–4	1–2	2–1	2–1	1–0	2–1	

Source: RSSSF
Rules for classification: 1st points; 2nd head-to-head points; 3rd head-to-head goal difference; 4th head-to-head goals scored; 5th goal difference; 6th number of goals scored

== Primera División promotion playoff ==
For the 1970–71 season, the Mexican Football Federation decided to expand the Primera División from 16 to 18 teams, for that reason a promotion playoff was played between the first four teams classified in the Segunda Division Championship Group. The series was held at the Estadio Olímpico Universitario, Mexico City between November 6 and 12, 1970. Puebla was the winner.

Pos	Team	Pld	W	D	L	GF	GA	GD	Pts	Promotion	PUE	UDC	NAC	NAU
1	Puebla (P)	3	2	1	0	4	2	+2	5	Promoted to Primera División		2–2	1–0	1–0
2	Unión de Curtidores	3	1	1	1	5	6	−1	3				0–3	
3	Nacional	3	1	0	2	3	3	0	2			1–3		
4	Naucalpan	3	1	0	2	3	4	−1	2				2–0	

Source: RSSSF
Rules for classification: 1st points; 2nd head-to-head points; 3rd head-to-head goal difference; 4th head-to-head goals scored; 5th goal difference; 6th number of goals scored
(P) Promoted

== Segunda División – Tercera División playoff ==
Due to the expansion of the Primera Division, and the dissolution of various clubs in the Segunda Division. The Mexican Football Federation decided to hold a promotional playoff between teams from the Segunda and Tercera Division. These series were held at the Estadio Plan de San Luis, San Luis Potosí City, between December 15 and 18, 1970.

This round was developed in the direct elimination format, that is, the winning teams in the first matches won promotion or permanence in the category. The same thing happens in the second round, until reaching a final match between the two worst teams. This phase was played by Celaya and Tampico, from the Segunda División; along with Atlético Cuernavaca, Cuautla, Querétaro and Universidad Veracruzana, from the Tercera División.

=== First stage ===
15 December 1970	Atlético Cuernavaca	3–2	Cuautla	San Luis Potosí City
				Stadium: Estadio Plan de San Luis

15 December 1970	Tampico Madero	2–2 (5–4 agg.)	Universidad Veracruzana	San Luis Potosí City
				Stadium: Estadio Plan de San Luis

16 December 1970	Querétaro	4–0	Celaya	San Luis Potosí City
				Stadium: Estadio Plan de San Luis

=== Second stage ===
16 December 1970	Cuautla	2–1	Universidad Veracruzana	San Luis Potosí City
				Stadium: Estadio Plan de San Luis

=== Final stage ===
18 December 1970	Universidad Veracruzana	3–1	Celaya	San Luis Potosí City
				Stadium: Estadio Plan de San Luis
