= 1968–69 Mexican Segunda División season =

Segunda División de México
- Season: 1968–69
- Champions: Torreón (1st Title)
- Promoted: Zapata
- Relegated: Texcoco
- Matches: 306
- Goals: 812 (2.65 per match)
- Top goalscorer: Guillermo Arciniegas (24 goals)

The 1968–69 Mexican Segunda División was the 19th season of the Mexican Segunda División. The season started on 15 March 1968 and concluded on 16 February 1969. It was won by Torreón.

== Changes ==
- Laguna was promoted to Primera División.
- Morelia was relegated from Primera División.
- Orizaba was relegated from Segunda División.
- Zapata was promoted from Tercera División.

== Teams ==
1968-69 Season Teams

Club	City	Stadium
Celaya	Celaya	Estadio Miguel Alemán Valdés
La Piedad	La Piedad	Estadio Juan N. López
Ciudad Madero	Ciudad Madero	Estadio Tamaulipas
Morelia	Morelia	Estadio Venustiano Carranza
Nacional	Guadalajara	Estadio Jalisco
Poza Rica	Poza Rica; Gutiérrez Zamora	Parque Jaime J. Merino; Raymundo Pérez Reyes
Puebla	Puebla	Estadio Olímpico Ignacio Zaragoza; Estadio Cuauhtémoc
Salamanca	Salamanca	Estadio El Molinito
Tampico	Tampico	Estadio Tamaulipas
Tepic	Tepic	Estadio Nicolás Álvarez Ortega
Texcoco	Texcoco	Estadio Municipal de Texcoco
Torreón	Torreón	Estadio Revolución
Unión de Curtidores	León	Estadio La Martinica
U. de N.L.	Monterrey	Estadio Universitario
Ciudad Victoria	Ciudad Victoria	Estadio Marte R. Gómez
Zacatepec	Zacatepec	Estadio Agustín "Coruco" Díaz
Zamora	Zamora	Estadio Moctezuma
Zapata	Jojutla	Estadio Agustín "Coruco" Díaz

== League table ==
Pos	Team	Pld	W	D	L	GF	GA	GAv	Pts	Qualification or relegation
1	Torreón (C, P)	34	25	5	4	69	32	2.156	55	Promoted to Primera División
2	Zacatepec	34	18	9	7	48	25	1.920	45	
3	Puebla	34	15	12	7	44	28	1.571	42	
4	Unión de Curtidores	34	17	8	9	59	41	1.439	42	
5	Zamora	34	14	12	8	43	37	1.162	40	
6	Morelia	34	15	9	10	57	46	1.239	39	
7	La Piedad	34	14	9	11	48	41	1.171	37	
8	Nacional	34	13	7	14	52	57	0.912	33	
9	Salamanca	34	12	8	14	44	39	1.128	32	
10	Tampico	34	14	4	16	47	56	0.839	32	
11	Poza Rica	34	8	15	11	46	50	0.920	31	
12	Ciudad Victoria	34	8	14	12	29	38	0.763	30	
13	Celaya	34	9	10	15	42	44	0.955	28	
14	U. de N.L.	34	9	9	16	46	57	0.807	27	
15	Ciudad Madero	34	7	13	14	40	52	0.769	27	
16	Tepic	34	9	9	16	32	50	0.640	27	
17	Zapata	34	8	10	16	44	50	0.880	26	
18	Texcoco (R)	34	5	9	20	22	69	0.319	19	Relegated to Tercera División

Source: RSSSF
(C) Champions; (P) Promoted; (R) Relegated

== Results ==
Home \ Away	CEL	LPD	MAD	MOR	NAC	PZR	PUE	SAL	TAM	TEP	TEX	TOR	UDC	UNL	VIC	ZAC	ZAM	ZAP
Celaya	—	3–1	3–1	0–0	6–3	0–0	0–2	1–0	2–3	0–0	3–0	1–2	1–2	2–0	1–1	0–0	1–2	0–1
La Piedad	3–1	—	0–0	1–1	1–0	1–0	2–1	0–1	1–0	2–0	6–0	0–1	1–1	2–0	1–1	0–1	0–0	3–2
Ciudad Madero	0–2	2–1	—	4–1	2–2	2–2	0–0	2–2	0–1	0–1	1–0	0–1	1–2	3–3	1–1	1–1	1–1	0–1
Morelia	4–1	1–0	2–2	—	3–1	4–1	1–1	0–0	4–1	2–1	5–0	1–3	2–1	2–0	3–0	1–1	0–0	1–0
Nacional	3–1	1–1	3–2	1–0	—	3–1	1–1	1–2	3–1	2–1	2–0	1–2	4–2	0–1	3–0	1–1	2–1	3–1
Poza Rica	1–1	0–1	2–3	4–1	2–0	—	1–0	0–0	3–2	1–1	2–2	2–2	1–4	1–2	2–2	3–0	1–1	2–1
Puebla	2–0	0–0	2–1	3–2	3–1	1–2	—	2–0	3–2	4–0	2–0	1–2	1–2	2–1	0–0	2–1	1–0	2–0
Salamanca	1–0	1–2	2–0	3–0	2–2	2–2	0–1	—	1–1	4–0	2–0	1–2	1–2	2–1	0–0	2–1	1–0	2–0
Tampico	1–3	3–1	2–1	2–1	3–2	1–3	1–2	1–0	—	2–1	1–0	3–2	2–1	3–0	0–2	0–2	2–1	2–1
Tepic	0–0	5–3	1–1	0–1	0–1	2–1	0–0	1–0	1–1	—	1–2	1–2	1–1	1–1	1–0	1–0	2–3	2–1
Texcoco	0–4	2–0	0–1	2–2	0–0	2–2	0–0	0–4	1–1	0–3	—	0–3	0–0	1–0	1–2	0–0	3–1	1–1
Torreón	2–1	2–2	3–0	2–3	4–1	0–0	2–1	3–1	3–2	6–0	2–0	—	2–1	1–0	2–0	1–0	2–0	3–2
Unión de Curtidores	2–2	2–1	2–1	1–1	3–2	1–0	0–1	3–2	1–0	1–0	6–1	2–0	—	3–0	3–0	0–1	6–1	0–2
U. de N.L.	1–0	2–3	2–1	1–3	6–1	2–2	1–1	3–3	0–3	2–2	2–0	0–1	1–0	—	1–1	2–1	5–1	1–2
Ciudad Victoria	2–1	2–2	1–2	2–1	0–1	1–1	2–0	2–0	1–0	1–0	0–1	0–2	2–2	1–1	—	0–1	0–0	0–0
Zacatepec	3–0	2–1	0–0	4–1	1–0	1–0	1–1	1–0	1–0	3–0	3–0	3–3	3–0	2–1	3–1	—	0–0	4–2
Zamora	0–0	3–1	0–1	3–2	2–0	3–0	2–1	2–1	3–0	2–1	3–0	1–1	1–1	2–0	0–0	1–0	—	1–0
Zapata	1–1	1–1	5–2	0–1	1–1	1–1	1–1	3–1	4–0	0–1	2–3	0–2	2–2	3–3	1–0	0–2	2–2	—

Source: RSSSF
Legend: Blue = home team win; Yellow = draw; Red = away team win.
