= 1970–71 Mexican Segunda División season =

Segunda División de México
- Season: 1970–71
- Champions: San Luis (1st Title)
- Promoted: San Luis; Atlético Cuernavaca; Cuautla; Querétaro; Universidad Veracruzana
- Relegated: Nuevo León
- Matches: 272
- Goals: 676 (2.49 per match)
- Top goalscorer: Marino Guevara (22 goals)

The 1970–71 Segunda División was the 22nd season of the Mexican Segunda División. The season started on 19 December 1970 and concluded on 8 August 1971. It was won by San Luis, which was the first team to win the Segunda división one year after being promoted from Tercera División.

== Changes ==
- Zacatepec and Puebla were promoted to Primera División.
- Zapata was relegated from Segunda División.
- San Luis, Atlético Cuernavaca, Cuautla, Querétaro and Universidad Veracruzana were promoted from Tercera División.
- Celaya and C.D. Poza Rica were dissolved.

== Teams ==
1970–71 season Teams

Club	City	Stadium
Atlético Cuernavaca	Cuernavaca	Estadio Centenario
Cuautla	Cuautla	Estadio Isidro Gil Tapia
La Piedad	La Piedad	Estadio Juan N. López
Ciudad Madero	Ciudad Madero	Estadio Tamaulipas
Morelia	Morelia	Estadio Venustiano Carranza
Nacional	Guadalajara	Estadio Jalisco
Naucalpan	Naucalpan	Unidad Cuauhtémoc
Nuevo León	Monterrey	Estadio Tecnológico
Querétaro	Querétaro City	Estadio Municipal de Querétaro
Salamanca	Salamanca	Estadio El Molinito
San Luis	San Luis Potosí City	Estadio Plan de San Luis
Tampico	Tampico	Estadio Tamaulipas
Tepic	Tepic	Estadio Nicolás Álvarez Ortega
Unión de Curtidores	León	Estadio La Martinica
UANL	Monterrey	Estadio Universitario
Universidad Veracruzana	Xalapa	Estadio Antonio M. Quirasco
Ciudad Victoria	Ciudad Victoria	Estadio Marte R. Gómez
Zamora	Zamora	Estadio Moctezuma

== League table ==
Pos	Team	Pld	W	D	L	GF	GA	GAv	Pts	Qualification or relegation
1	San Luis (C, P)	32	16	13	3	50	26	1.923	45	Promoted to Primera División
2	Zamora	32	17	6	9	51	32	1.594	40	
3	Tampico	32	13	13	6	50	33	1.515	39	
4	Naucalpan	32	15	9	8	41	28	1.464	39	
5	Querétaro	32	14	10	8	50	37	1.351	38	
6	UANL	32	14	10	8	37	28	1.321	38	
7	Unión de Curtidores	32	14	8	10	46	37	1.243	36	
8	La Piedad	32	10	16	6	39	35	1.114	36	
9	Tepic	32	9	12	11	34	53	0.642	30	
10	Nacional	32	8	13	11	50	47	1.064	29	
11	Salamanca	32	12	5	15	35	49	0.714	29	
12	Cuautla	32	9	10	13	41	48	0.854	28	
13	Atlético Cuernavaca	32	9	8	15	37	47	0.787	26	
14	Ciudad Madero	32	8	10	14	33	49	0.673	26	
15	Ciudad Victoria	32	8	8	16	33	46	0.717	24	
16	Universidad Veracruzana	32	4	13	15	23	38	0.605	21	
17	Nuevo León	32	6	8	18	26	43	0.605	20	Relegated to Tercera División
18	Morelia (Note: Morelia had started the season but in the round 20 against Zamora, the match was suspended due to incidents, as result of this, Morelia was disqualified and all its matches were annulled.)	0	0	0	0	0	0	—	0	Disqualified

Source: RSSSF
(C) Champions; (P) Promoted

== Results ==
Home \ Away	ATC	CUA	LPD	MAD	NAC	NAU	NVL	QUE	SAL	SLP	TAM	TEP	UDC	UNL	UVC	VIC	ZAM
Atl. Cuernavaca	—	2–0	1–3	1–1	1–1	3–1	1–0	1–2	0–1	0–0	1–1	5–1	3–0	0–1	1–0	0–0	0–2
Cuautla	2–0	—	1–1	4–0	3–0	0–0	0–1	3–1	1–2	2–2	0–1	1–1	1–1	0–0	2–1	1–0	4–1
La Piedad	1–1	2–0	—	2–1	1–1	1–0	1–1	1–1	4–1	2–2	2–2	1–0	2–1	0–0	2–2	1–0	0–0
Ciudad Madero	1–1	1–1	3–3	—	1–1	2–0	2–1	1–0	4–1	1–2	1–1	0–0	1–1	1–2	3–1	0–0	1–0
Nacional	3–1	1–2	0–0	6–1	—	3–4	1–2	2–0	5–2	0–4	2–2	5–1	2–3	1–2	2–0	0–2	1–1
Naucalpan	3–1	2–1	0–1	3–0	0–0	—	1–0	2–2	1–1	1–2	1–0	4–0	1–0	0–0	1–0	3–0	3–0
Nuevo León	1–2	3–1	0–0	1–3	0–5	0–1	—	3–1	0–0	2–2	0–1	1–2	2–1	0–1	0–0	1–1	1–2
Querétaro	2–0	4–0	2–0	1–0	1–1	1–1	3–0	—	1–0	0–0	4–1	3–0	2–1	0–0	2–2	3–0	3–1
Salamanca	3–1	0–1	1–1	1–2	3–1	0–2	2–1	2–1	—	0–3	1–0	1–1	0–1	3–1	3–0	1–0	1–0
San Luis	1–0	1–1	3–1	1–1	1–1	1–0	1–1	4–1	1–0	—	2–1	1–0	1–1	2–0	1–0	5–2	0–1
Tampico	3–2	3–1	4–0	1–0	0–0	5–1	1–0	2–2	2–1	0–0	—	7–1	0–0	1–1	0–0	0–0	4–3
Tepic	2–2	5–2	2–2	1–0	0–0	1–1	1–0	0–1	1–1	1–1	1–0	—	2–0	1–1	1–1	2–1	0–2
Unión de Curtidores	4–2	4–1	1–0	2–0	1–2	0–1	1–0	4–1	4–0	0–3	3–3	5–1	—	1–0	0–0	1–1	3–1
UANL	2–1	3–2	1–0	2–1	3–0	1–1	1–0	3–3	3–0	2–1	0–1	1–1	0–1	—	1–0	3–0	0–0
Univ. Veracruzana	0–1	1–1	2–1	1–0	1–1	0–1	1–1	0–0	0–1	0–0	1–2	1–2	1–1	2–0	—	2–1	1–1
Ciudad Victoria	1–2	1–1	0–2	2–0	2–2	0–0	3–1	1–2	2–1	0–1	2–1	1–2	3–1	3–2	3–1	—	1–2
Zamora	4–0	3–1	1–1	5–0	2–0	2–1	0–2	1–0	4–1	4–1	0–0	3–0	0–1	1–0	2–1	2–0	—

Source: RSSSF
Legend: Blue = home team win; Yellow = draw; Red = away team win.
