= 1959–60 Mexican Segunda División season =

Segunda División de México
- Season: 1959–60
- Champions: Monterrey (2nd Title)
- Matches played: 306
- Goals scored: 906 (2.96 per match)

The 1959–60 Mexican Segunda División was the tenth season of the Mexican Segunda División. The season started on 19 July 1959 and concluded on 20 March 1960. It was won by Monterrey, which became the first club to win two championships in this category.

== Changes ==
- Tampico was promoted to Primera División
- Cuautla was relegated from Primera División.
- Ciudad Victoria, Orizaba, Tepic and Valladolid joined the league.
- Durango, San José and San Sebastián have dissolved.
- Municipal was renamed as Irapuatense.
- Oviedo was relocated from Tlalnepantla de Baz to Texcoco.
- Due to budget problems on March 7, 1960, between weeks 32 and 33, Nuevo León was acquired by Universidad Autónoma de Nuevo León and renamed as U. de N.L.

== Teams ==
1959-60 Season Teams

Club	City	Stadium
Cuautla	Cuautla	Balneario El Almeal
Irapuatense	Irapuato	Estadio Revolución
La Piedad	La Piedad	Estadio Juan N. López
Laguna	Torreón	Estadio San Isidro
Monterrey	Monterrey	Estadio Tecnológico
Nacional	Guadalajara	Parque Oro
Nuevo León/U. de N.L.	Monterrey	Estadio Tecnológico
Orizaba	Orizaba	Estadio Moctezuma
Oviedo	Texcoco	Estadio Municipal de Texcoco
Poza Rica	Poza Rica	Parque Jaime J. Merino
Querétaro	Querétaro	Estadio Municipal
Refinería Madero	Ciudad Madero	Estadio Tampico
Salamanca	Salamanca	Estadio El Molinito
San Luis	San Luis Potosí	Estadio Plan de San Luis
Tepic	Tepic	Estadio Nicolás Álvarez Ortega
UNAM	Mexico City	Estadio Olímpico Universitario
Valladolid	Morelia	Campo Morelia
Ciudad Victoria	Ciudad Victoria	Estadio Marte R. Gómez

== League table ==
Pos	Team	Pld	W	D	L	GF	GA	GAv	Pts	Qualification or relegation
1	Monterrey (C, P)	34	20	8	6	65	30	2.167	48	Promoted to Primera División
2	Refinería Madero	34	18	10	6	76	38	2.000	46	
3	Poza Rica	34	17	8	9	62	44	1.409	42	
4	Nacional	34	15	12	7	52	40	1.300	42	
5	Cuautla	34	15	10	9	57	43	1.326	40	
6	Valladolid	34	13	13	8	43	34	1.265	39	
7	UNAM	34	15	9	10	52	48	1.083	39	
8	La Piedad	34	14	7	13	55	51	1.078	35	
9	San Luis	34	13	8	13	44	41	1.073	34	
10	Querétaro	34	10	13	11	51	56	0.911	33	
11	Nuevo León - U. de N.L.	34	9	12	13	55	57	0.965	30	
12	Orizaba	34	12	6	16	46	56	0.821	30	
13	Tepic	34	10	9	15	40	49	0.816	29	
14	Salamanca	34	10	9	15	44	64	0.688	29	
15	Oviedo	34	10	8	16	52	66	0.788	28	
16	Laguna	34	8	12	14	38	52	0.731	28	
17	Ciudad Victoria	34	8	8	18	38	53	0.717	24	
18	Irapuatense	34	5	6	23	36	84	0.429	16	

Source: RSSSF
(C) Champions; (P) Promoted

== Results ==
Home \ Away	CUA	IRA	LPD	LAG	MON	NAC	NVL	ORI	OVI	PZR	QUE	RMA	SAL	SNL	TEP	UNM	VAL	VIC
Cuautla	—	1–2	4–0	3–2	4–1	5–1	2–1	1–0	4–1	0–1	1–0	1–1	1–0	0–3	0–0	0–0	2–2	1–0
Irapuatense	2–4	—	2–7	0–0	0–1	0–1	1–2	5–2	0–1	0–1	1–1	2–0	2–1	0–0	0–0	1–3	0–1	0–3
La Piedad	2–2	4–1	—	1–0	3–1	1–0	4–2	2–1	7–0	2–1	1–1	0–1	1–2	0–0	0–0	1–0	2–1	3–1
Laguna	1–1	3–1	0–0	—	0–2	1–0	2–0	3–3	2–1	2–2	2–2	3–3	4–2	3–1	1–3	1–2	0–2	0–0
Monterrey	2–0	5–0	2–0	4–0	—	2–0	2–2	3–0	3–0	1–0	3–0	1–2	3–1	1–0	4–1	4–1	1–1	1–0
Nacional	3–0	1–1	2–0	0–0	2–2	—	0–0	2–1	4–1	1–0	1–0	1–1	2–1	2–1	1–2	2–0	1–1	2–0
Nuevo León - U. de N.L.	2–2	3–0	4–1	0–1	0–2	4–5	—	2–1	1–0	1–1	1–1	2–2	3–1	1–2	2–2	1–1	1–1	3–0
Orizaba	2–1	2–2	3–1	1–0	1–2	2–2	1–3	—	3–1	2–1	3–0	0–1	1–1	1–0	2–1	1–0	0–0	2–0
Oviedo	1–1	6–2	5–0	1–1	1–1	3–3	2–4	0–1	—	1–2	2–2	2–1	3–3	2–1	3–1	2–3	3–2	3–1
Poza Rica	1–1	2–1	1–2	2–1	3–3	3–2	3–2	5–2	1–0	—	2–2	1–0	6–1	3–1	2–1	3–0	1–1	3–1
Querétaro	1–3	3–2	1–3	1–3	0–1	2–2	5–2	3–1	1–0	4–3	—	3–1	1–0	2–2	3–1	3–1	1–1	1–0
Refinería Madero	2–1	7–0	2–1	6–0	2–2	2–2	2–2	4–0	3–0	3–2	2–1	—	7–0	3–2	3–0	3–1	3–0	3–1
Salamanca	2–1	0–2	3–2	3–0	2–0	0–0	3–1	1–1	2–1	1–2	1–1	3–1	—	1–2	2–1	4–3	0–2	2–2
San Luis	0–2	6–1	1–0	1–0	2–1	2–1	1–0	3–2	0–0	2–0	1–1	0–3	1–1	—	1–0	1–1	1–2	1–2
Tepic	2–4	2–1	2–0	0–0	1–0	2–3	1–1	1–3	0–0	0–2	2–2	2–0	3–0	2–1	—	1–2	2–0	1–1
UNAM	2–2	4–1	3–2	1–0	0–0	0–2	2–0	2–0	4–2	1–1	2–0	1–1	0–0	1–1	3–1	—	2–4	2–1
Valladolid	2–0	4–2	0–0	2–2	1–1	0–0	1–0	2–1	1–2	1–0	3–0	1–1	0–0	0–2	1–0	0–1	—	2–0
Ciudad Victoria	1–2	3–1	2–2	1–0	0–3	0–1	2–2	1–0	1–2	1–1	2–2	0–0	4–0	2–1	1–2	2–3	2–1	—

Source: RSSSF
Legend: Blue = home team win; Yellow = draw; Red = away team win.
