= 1967–68 Mexican Segunda División season =

Segunda División de México
- Season: 1967–68
- Champions: Laguna (1st Title)
- Relegated: Orizaba
- Matches: 306
- Goals: 834 (2.73 per match)
- Top goalscorer: José Zamora (26 goals)

The 1967–68 Mexican Segunda División was the 18th season of the Mexican Segunda División. The season started on 9 July 1967 and concluded on 25 February 1968. It was won by Laguna.

During this season, the Tercera División was created, so it was the first season in which the Second Division had a club relegated to a lower category, Orizaba was the first team to be relegated.

== Changes ==
- Pachuca was promoted to Primera División.
- Ciudad Madero was relegated from Primera División.
- The league was expanded from 16 to 18 teams, for that reason U. de N.L. and Unión de Curtidores joined the league.

== Teams ==
1967-68 Season Teams

Club	City	Stadium
Celaya	Celaya	Estadio Miguel Alemán Valdés
La Piedad	La Piedad	Estadio Juan N. López
Laguna	Torreón	Estadio San Isidro
Ciudad Madero	Ciudad Madero	Estadio Tamaulipas
Nacional	Guadalajara	Estadio Jalisco
Orizaba	Orizaba	Estadio Socum
Poza Rica	Poza Rica	Parque Jaime J. Merino
Puebla	Puebla	Estadio Olímpico Ignacio Zaragoza
Salamanca	Salamanca	Estadio El Molinito
Tampico	Tampico	Estadio Tamaulipas
Tepic	Tepic	Estadio Nicolás Álvarez Ortega
Texcoco	Texcoco	Estadio Municipal de Texcoco
Torreón	Torreón	Estadio Revolución
Unión de Curtidores	León	Estadio La Martinica
U. de N.L.	Monterrey	Estadio Universitario
Ciudad Victoria	Ciudad Victoria	Estadio Marte R. Gómez
Zacatepec	Zacatepec	Estadio Agustín "Coruco" Díaz
Zamora	Zamora	Estadio Moctezuma

== League table ==
Pos	Team	Pld	W	D	L	GF	GA	GAv	Pts	Qualification or relegation
1	Laguna (C, P)	34	21	9	4	70	25	2.800	51	Promoted to Primera División
2	Zacatepec	34	21	8	5	62	25	2.480	50	
3	Torreón	34	22	5	7	69	19	3.632	49	
4	Salamanca	34	18	10	6	52	28	1.857	46	
5	Puebla	34	18	7	9	54	33	1.636	43	
6	Ciudad Victoria	34	17	9	8	47	28	1.679	43	
7	Tampico	34	16	7	11	48	43	1.116	39	
8	Ciudad Madero	34	12	10	12	51	63	0.810	34	
9	Texcoco	34	12	9	13	40	42	0.952	33	
10	Poza Rica	34	12	8	14	45	39	1.154	32	
11	Unión de Curtidores	34	13	4	17	52	61	0.852	30	
12	Celaya	34	10	8	16	36	57	0.632	28	
13	Zamora	34	10	5	19	46	57	0.807	25	
14	Nacional	34	9	7	18	44	66	0.667	25	
15	La Piedad	34	5	12	17	26	51	0.510	22	
16	Tepic	34	4	13	17	26	58	0.448	21	
17	U. de N.L.	34	5	11	18	30	73	0.411	21	
18	Orizaba (R)	34	7	6	21	36	66	0.545	20	Relegated to Tercera División

Source: RSSSF
(C) Champions; (P) Promoted; (R) Relegated

== Results ==
Home \ Away	CEL	LPD	LAG	MAD	NAC	ORI	PZR	PUE	SAL	TAM	TEP	TEX	TOR	UDC	UNL	VIC	ZAC	ZAM
Celaya	—	3–1	0–3	0–1	2–1	2–2	2–1	2–1	1–2	2–0	3–1	0–0	0–1	1–0	3–0	2–0	0–0	1–3
La Piedad	0–0	—	1–1	1–0	1–2	1–0	2–1	0–1	0–0	1–0	1–1	0–0	2–2	2–3	1–1	0–1	0–3	2–0
Laguna	2–1	3–1	—	5–0	4–0	3–0	1–0	1–0	1–0	3–0	4–1	3–1	1–0	5–1	5–1	0–0	2–2	5–0
Ciudad Madero	4–1	3–1	1–1	—	2–1	4–2	2–1	1–1	1–1	1–1	2–1	0–3	0–8	3–3	4–0	2–1	1–1	2–1
Nacional	1–1	1–0	1–2	4–2	—	3–1	2–3	1–0	1–3	1–1	1–1	1–2	0–3	2–4	4–0	2–2	0–2	3–0
Orizaba	1–2	2–1	1–1	2–1	1–1	—	2–1	3–3	0–0	1–3	1–0	1–2	1–6	0–1	3–1	1–3	0–1	0–2
Poza Rica	3–0	4–1	0–0	2–2	0–1	2–0	—	1–1	0–1	1–1	3–1	6–0	1–0	1–0	1–0	2–1	1–1	2–1
Puebla	5–0	3–0	1–1	4–1	2–0	2–1	2–0	—	2–1	5–1	1–1	1–0	2–1	3–1	1–0	2–1	1–0	3–1
Salamanca	2–0	1–1	1–0	4–0	2–1	3–1	3–0	1–0	—	0–1	5–0	1–1	1–0	3–0	4–0	1–0	1–0	1–5
Tampico	3–1	5–1	1–0	0–3	3–2	2–0	2–2	2–0	1–2	—	2–0	1–0	0–1	3–1	1–1	3–2	2–0	2–2
Tepic	3–0	1–0	0–4	0–0	0–0	1–3	1–1	0–1	1–1	0–0	—	1–1	0–3	2–1	1–2	1–1	0–0	2–0
Texcoco	2–0	2–0	1–2	1–0	3–1	0–1	2–1	0–0	2–2	2–0	3–2	—	0–0	0–1	2–0	0–0	2–3	3–2
Torreón	4–0	1–1	2–1	1–1	4–0	2–1	0–1	1–0	2–0	1–0	5–0	3–1	—	2–1	7–0	3–1	0–1	1–0
Unión de Curtidores	4–2	2–0	3–0	1–3	3–0	2–1	2–2	3–5	1–2	0–1	1–1	1–0	0–1	—	1–1	2–3	0–3	2–1
U. de N.L.	1–1	1–1	2–2	2–1	1–2	2–2	1–0	2–1	1–1	1–3	0–0	2–2	1–3	1–2	—	0–1	1–1	3–0
Ciudad Victoria	1–1	0–0	1–1	1–1	6–1	1–0	1–0	2–0	1–1	3–0	2–0	1–0	1–0	3–2	2–0	—	2–1	1–0
Zacatepec	3–1	2–1	0–1	4–1	1–1	5–0	2–1	3–0	2–0	2–0	4–1	2–1	0–0	3–1	4–1	1–0	—	3–2
Zamora	1–1	1–1	1–2	3–1	4–2	2–1	1–0	0–0	1–1	1–3	2–1	2–1	0–1	1–3	6–0	0–1	0–2	—

Source: RSSSF
Legend: Blue = home team win; Yellow = draw; Red = away team win.
