= 1958–59 Mexican Segunda División season =

Segunda División de México
- Season: 1958–59
- Champions: Tampico (1st Title)
- Matches played: 272
- Goals scored: 1,016 (3.74 per match)

The 1958–59 Mexican Segunda División was the ninth season of the Mexican Segunda División. The season started on 13 July 1958 and concluded on 8 March 1959. It was won by Tampico.

== Changes ==
- Celaya was promoted to Primera División.
- Tampico was relegated from Primera División.
- UNAM returned to competition after a year on hiatus. IPN was dissolved due to political and economic problems.
- Durango, Nuevo León, Poza Rica and San José de Toluca joined the league.

== Teams ==
1958-59 Season Teams

Club	City	Stadium
Durango	Durango	Estadio Francisco Zarco
La Piedad	La Piedad	Estadio Juan N. López
Laguna	Torreón	Estadio San Isidro
Monterrey	Monterrey	Estadio Tecnológico
Municipal	Irapuato	Estadio Revolución
Nacional	Guadalajara	Parque Oro
Nuevo León	Monterrey	Estadio Tecnológico
Oviedo	Tlalnepantla	Campo Tlalnepantla
Poza Rica	Poza Rica	Parque Jaime J. Merino
Querétaro	Querétaro	Estadio Municipal
Refinería Madero	Ciudad Madero	Estadio Tampico
Salamanca	Salamanca	Estadio El Molinito
San José	Toluca	Estadio Héctor Barraza
San Luis	San Luis Potosí	Estadio Plan de San Luis
San Sebastián	León	Estadio La Martinica
Tampico	Tampico	Estadio Tampico
UNAM	Mexico City	Estadio Olímpico Universitario

== League table ==
Pos	Team	Pld	W	D	L	GF	GA	GAv	Pts	Qualification or relegation
1	Tampico (C, P)	32	28	3	1	116	31	3.742	59	Promoted to Primera División
2	Monterrey	32	25	2	5	80	29	2.759	52	
3	Salamanca	32	17	7	8	73	56	1.304	41	
4	Nacional	32	18	4	10	74	53	1.396	40	
5	Oviedo	32	14	7	11	47	41	1.146	35	
6	Laguna	32	16	3	13	74	71	1.042	35	
7	Poza Rica	32	14	6	12	67	46	1.457	34	
8	Refinería Madero	32	14	5	13	62	58	1.069	33	
9	Querétaro	32	12	7	13	45	59	0.763	31	
10	La Piedad	32	12	6	14	62	69	0.899	30	
11	Nuevo León	32	13	2	17	44	62	0.710	28	
12	Durango	32	9	7	16	47	59	0.797	25	
13	UNAM	32	9	7	16	43	59	0.729	25	
14	San Luis	32	7	9	16	46	72	0.639	23	
15	Municipal	32	7	6	19	52	77	0.675	20	
16	San José	32	6	6	20	48	95	0.505	18	
17	San Sebastián	32	6	3	23	36	79	0.456	15	

Source: RSSSF
(C) Champions; (P) Promoted

== Results ==
Home \ Away	DUR	LPD	LAG	MON	MUN	NAC	NVL	OVI	PZR	QUE	RMA	SAL	SJO	SNL	SSE	TAM	UNM
Durango	—	2–1	2–5	1–3	1–1	1–1	3–0	1–0	1–1	2–0	2–2	1–1	4–0	3–2	2–0	1–2	0–2
La Piedad	3–2	—	2–1	1–0	6–1	4–1	0–1	2–1	2–2	2–2	1–0	1–2	2–1	4–4	4–2	2–1	5–3
Laguna	3–1	7–2	—	1–0	3–2	1–2	4–0	3–1	2–1	3–1	1–1	3–5	4–2	4–1	2–0	3–3	4–0
Monterrey	2–0	4–1	4–0	—	5–1	3–0	2–0	2–0	0–0	1–0	3–2	4–0	8–0	3–1	3–1	1–3	1–0
Municipal	1–3	2–0	2–3	2–3	—	0–1	2–4	0–1	1–2	2–2	2–1	4–2	7–3	3–0	2–0	2–3	1–1
Nacional	2–0	5–1	3–1	1–2	6–2	—	3–0	1–3	1–0	2–0	4–2	0–2	3–0	1–1	6–3	2–3	3–2
Nuevo León	1–0	3–1	2–2	2–4	3–1	1–0	—	1–2	4–1	4–3	0–1	0–1	2–3	3–2	2–1	0–3	2–0
Oviedo	1–0	2–2	4–1	0–0	2–2	3–4	0–1	—	1–0	1–0	1–1	0–0	4–0	1–3	4–0	0–3	0–1
Poza Rica	2–0	4–1	4–1	1–2	3–1	3–2	5–0	0–2	—	3–0	4–1	6–1	7–2	1–1	3–2	1–3	1–1
Querétaro	1–6	2–1	3–1	0–2	3–1	1–1	1–0	1–1	1–0	—	4–1	1–1	4–3	1–0	4–0	1–2	1–0
Refinería Madero	4–0	2–1	4–0	3–4	2–1	4–0	1–3	2–1	2–1	2–0	—	2–1	2–0	3–1	4–1	1–5	1–0
Salamanca	3–2	1–0	4–3	3–1	3–0	1–4	5–3	2–1	3–3	6–0	3–2	—	7–1	3–2	4–1	1–2	1–1
San José	1–1	1–1	3–2	1–3	1–2	1–3	1–0	4–0	1–2	1–1	2–2	3–2	—	5–1	1–1	2–2	0–3
San Luis	2–0	1–5	2–0	0–2	2–2	1–5	1–1	1–3	2–1	0–0	4–4	1–1	3–1	—	2–1	1–1	3–1
San Sebastián	2–2	3–1	0–2	1–3	2–1	2–2	2–1	1–2	1–3	1–2	0–1	0–2	3–2	3–1	—	0–2	2–1
Tampico	5–0	5–2	8–1	3–2	5–0	5–1	4–0	2–0	2–1	5–2	2–0	3–0	8–2	4–0	7–0	—	7–1
UNAM	5–3	1–1	2–3	0–1	1–1	0–4	3–0	2–3	1–1	1–3	3–2	2–2	1–0	2–0	1–0	1–3	—

Source: RSSSF
Legend: Blue = home team win; Yellow = draw; Red = away team win.
