= 1969–70 Mexican Segunda División season =

Segunda División de México
- Season: 1969–70
- Champions: Zacatepec (3rd Title)
- Promoted: Naucalpan
- Relegated: Zapata
- Matches played: 306
- Goals scored: 786 (2.57 per match)
- Top goalscorer: Francisco Mancilla (21 goals)

The 1969–70 Mexican Segunda División was the 20th season of the Mexican Segunda División. The season started on 10 July 1969 and concluded on 1 March 1970. It was won by Zacatepec.

== Changes ==
- Torreón was promoted to Primera División.
- Nuevo León was relegated from Primera División.
- Texcoco was relegated from Segunda División.
- Naucalpan was promoted from Tercera División.

== Teams ==
1969-70 Season Teams

Club	City	Stadium
Celaya	Celaya	Estadio Miguel Alemán Valdés
La Piedad	La Piedad	Estadio Juan N. López
Ciudad Madero	Ciudad Madero	Estadio Tamaulipas
Morelia	Morelia	Estadio Venustiano Carranza
Nacional	Guadalajara	Estadio Jalisco
Naucalpan	Naucalpan	Unidad Cuauhtémoc
Nuevo León	Monterrey	Estadio Tecnológico
Poza Rica	Poza Rica	Estadio Heriberto Jara Corona
Puebla	Puebla	Estadio Cuauhtémoc
Salamanca	Salamanca	Estadio El Molinito
Tampico	Tampico	Estadio Tamaulipas
Tepic	Tepic	Estadio Nicolás Álvarez Ortega
Unión de Curtidores	León	Estadio La Martinica
U. de N.L.	Monterrey	Estadio Universitario
Ciudad Victoria	Ciudad Victoria	Estadio Marte R. Gómez
Zacatepec	Zacatepec	Estadio Agustín "Coruco" Díaz
Zamora	Zamora	Estadio Moctezuma
Zapata	Jojutla	Estadio Agustín "Coruco" Díaz

== League table ==
Pos	Team	Pld	W	D	L	GF	GA	GAv	Pts	Qualification or relegation
1	Zacatepec (C, P)	34	21	8	5	63	25	2.520	50	Promoted to Primera División
2	Nuevo León	34	19	6	9	49	32	1.531	44	
3	Tampico	34	15	12	7	48	31	1.548	42	
4	Salamanca	34	13	14	7	45	35	1.286	40	
5	U. de N.L.	34	14	12	8	54	43	1.256	40	
6	La Piedad	34	14	10	10	53	43	1.233	38	
7	Zamora	34	13	12	9	46	38	1.211	38	
8	Naucalpan	34	15	7	12	59	47	1.255	37	
9	Unión de Curtidores	34	12	10	12	46	40	1.150	34	
10	Puebla	34	13	8	13	38	37	1.027	34	
11	Nacional	34	11	9	14	36	43	0.837	31	
12	Ciudad Victoria	34	10	10	14	40	46	0.870	30	
13	Morelia	34	12	6	16	48	59	0.814	30	
14	Poza Rica	34	10	10	14	35	44	0.795	30	
15	Ciudad Madero	34	8	12	14	33	48	0.688	28	
16	Tepic	34	9	9	16	29	51	0.569	27	
17	Celaya	34	9	8	17	37	57	0.649	26	
18	Zapata (R)	34	1	11	22	27	67	0.403	13	Relegated to Tercera División

Source: RSSSF
(C) Champions; (P) Promoted; (R) Relegated

== Results ==
Home \ Away	CEL	LPD	MAD	MOR	NAC	NAU	NVL	PZR	PUE	SAL	TAM	TEP	UDC	UNL	VIC	ZAC	ZAM	ZAP
Celaya	—	2–3	0–1	5–2	1–2	1–1	2–2	0–1	1–0	0–0	2–0	3–2	0–1	0–1	2–1	2–2	1–0	1–3
La Piedad	4–0	—	2–2	0–0	1–0	2–0	2–0	1–1	1–3	1–0	1–1	2–0	0–2	1–0	2–1	2–0	1–2	2–1
Ciudad Madero	0–1	1–0	—	3–1	1–1	0–2	0–0	0–0	1–1	4–1	1–2	4–1	2–4	2–0	1–1	0–0	1–1	2–0
Morelia	1–2	1–1	2–2	—	2–4	2–1	1–6	3–1	1–2	1–2	0–0	3–1	3–1	2–0	3–0	1–3	2–2	2–1
Nacional	0–0	1–1	2–0	2–0	—	0–4	1–2	1–1	3–1	2–3	2–0	0–1	1–0	1–2	1–0	0–1	1–5	2–0
Naucalpan	2–1	5–3	2–2	2–1	1–1	—	3–1	2–1	2–0	1–2	1–2	2–0	2–1	2–0	2–2	1–1	3–0	5–1
Nuevo León	5–1	2–2	1–0	2–1	1–2	3–0	—	3–0	2–0	0–1	0–0	1–0	1–0	1–0	1–0	1–0	3–1	1–0
Poza Rica	2–0	1–0	2–0	4–3	0–0	1–0	2–3	—	0–1	0–1	0–0	1–0	2–2	2–5	1–3	0–1	0–0	3–0
Puebla	2–1	1–1	1–0	1–2	1–0	2–3	0–1	2–0	—	1–0	2–1	3–1	2–1	2–2	3–0	1–2	0–0	4–2
Salamanca	1–1	3–1	1–1	0–1	1–2	2–0	2–1	4–1	0–0	—	3–1	2–2	2–3	4–2	0–0	1–0	1–1	3–2
Tampico	1–0	2–1	1–1	3–0	0–0	2–1	0–2	2–1	1–0	2–2	—	5–0	2–1	1–3	2–1	1–0	2–0	8–0
Tepic	1–1	0–3	2–0	0–1	3–0	1–0	3–0	1–1	1–0	1–1	1–1	—	1–0	1–1	0–0	1–1	0–2	0–0
Unión de Curtidores	2–1	0–3	4–0	1–1	1–0	1–1	0–1	0–1	1–0	1–0	1–1	4–0	—	2–2	3–1	0–0	1–0	1–1
U. de N.L.	2–2	5–3	2–0	2–0	2–1	2–0	2–0	2–2	3–1	1–1	0–0	3–0	2–2	—	1–1	0–3	3–0	1–0
Ciudad Victoria	4–0	3–1	2–0	2–1	3–2	3–2	1–1	1–0	0–0	1–1	0–1	1–2	1–1	0–0	—	1–3	1–2	2–1
Zacatepec	3–0	1–3	5–0	2–0	3–0	1–0	3–0	2–1	3–1	0–0	2–1	3–1	2–1	2–2	3–0	—	1–1	3–0
Zamora	4–1	1–1	3–0	1–3	0–0	3–3	1–0	1–2	0–0	0–0	1–1	2–0	3–2	3–0	2–1	0–2	—	2–1
Zapata	1–2	1–1	0–1	0–1	2–2	2–3	1–1	0–0	0–0	1–1	1–1	0–1	1–1	1–1	1–2	2–5	0–2	—

Source: RSSSF
Legend: Blue = home team win; Yellow = draw; Red = away team win.
