= Refugio Fernández =

Mexican footballer (born 1939)

Personal information
- Full name: José Refugio Fernández Meléndez
- Date of birth: 23 June 1939 (age 87)
- Place of birth: Guadalajara, Jalisco, Mexico
- Position: Inside right

Senior career*
Years	Team	Apps	(Gls)
1964–1965	Atlas		
1965–1968	Laguna		
1968–1969	Poza Rica		
1969–1970	Zamora		
1970	Nacional		

International career
1969	Mexico	2	(0)
- * Club domestic league appearances and goals

José Refugio Fernández Meléndez (born 23 June 1939) is a retired Mexican footballer. Nicknamed "La Coyota", he primarily played for Laguna throughout the late 1960s and for various other clubs in the early 1970s. He also represented Mexico for the 1969 CONCACAF Championship.

== Club career ==
Fernández began his career with Atlas for the 1964–65 season. Not finding success, he then played for Laguna in the 1965–66 Mexican Segunda División. Forming the offensive formation of the club alongside Gerardo Lupercio and Acapulco Herrera, they all contributed to the club achieving promotion following the 1966–67 season witgh Fernández notably scoring the winning goal on 12 February 1968 against Zacatepec. He was then signed by Zamora as he was then part of the winning squad for the 1969–70 Copa México Segunda División even with the club having an average performance during the 1969–70 Mexican Segunda División. He spent his final season with Nacional who were on their way to being promoted to reaching the promotional playoffs but Fernández would be left as a reserve player, prompting to him to retire following the 1970 Mexican Segunda División season.

== International career ==
Fernández was called up to represent Mexico for the 1969 CONCACAF Championship. He made his only appearance as a substitute for Severo de Sales in the 0–0 draw against Trinidad and Tobago on 7 December 1969.
