= 1963–64 Mexican Primera División season =

21st professional season of the top-flight football league in Mexico

Primera División de México
- Season: 1963–64
- Champions: Guadalajara (6th title)
- Matches: 182
- Goals: 528 (2.9 per match)

Statistics of the Primera División de México for the 1963–64 season.

== Overview ==
Zacatepec was promoted to Primera División.

The season was contested by 14 teams, and Guadalajara won the championship.

No Relegation this season.

Promotional tournament was held to increase the number of teams for the 1964–65 season to 16. Nacional finished in first place, and was not to be relegated from the Primera Division. Veracruz finished in second place, and was promoted to Primera Division.

=== Teams ===
Location of the 1963-64 Primera División teams

Team	City	Stadium
América	Mexico City	Olímpico Universitario
Atlante	Mexico City	Olímpico Universitario
Atlas	Guadalajara, Jalisco	Jalisco
Guadalajara	Guadalajara, Jalisco	Jalisco
Irapuato	Irapuato, Guanajuato	Revolución
León	León, Guanajuato	La Martinica
Morelia	Morelia, Michoacán	Campo Independiente
Monterrey	Monterrey, Nuevo León	Tecnológico
Nacional	Guadalajara, Jalisco	Jalisco
Necaxa	Mexico City	Olímpico Universitario
Oro	Guadalajara, Jalisco	Jalisco
Toluca	Toluca, State of Mexico	Luis Gutiérrez Dosal
UNAM	Mexico City	Olímpico Universitario
Zacatepec	Zacatepec, Morelos	Parque del Ingenio

== League standings ==
Pos	Team	Pld	W	D	L	GF	GA	GD	Pts	Qualification
1	Guadalajara	26	16	5	5	43	25	+18	37	Champions
2	América	26	11	11	4	46	24	+22	33	
3	Monterrey	26	12	8	6	40	26	+14	32	
4	Irapuato	26	12	8	6	40	35	+5	32	
5	Zacatepec	26	11	6	9	44	35	+9	28	
6	Necaxa	26	11	5	10	42	31	+11	27	
7	UNAM	26	9	7	10	36	33	+3	25	
8	Oro	26	9	7	10	53	49	+4	25	
9	León	26	9	7	10	34	33	+1	25	
10	Atlas	26	6	13	7	35	42	−7	25	
11	Toluca	26	6	10	10	31	35	−4	22	
12	Morelia	26	6	9	11	28	50	−22	21	
13	Atlante	26	6	8	12	30	39	−9	20	
14	Nacional	26	4	4	18	26	71	−45	12	Promotion Tournament

1963–64 winners

6th title

== Results ==
Home \ Away	AME	ATE	ATS	GDL	IRA	LEO	MTY	MOR	NAL	NEC	ORO	TOL	UNM	ZAC
América	—	0–0	3–0	0–2	0–0	0–0	1–0	5–0	5–0	4–2	1–0	1–1	1–1	2–1
Atlante	3–3	—	2–0	2–3	3–0	1–0	2–1	0–1	0–1	1–0	2–0	0–2	2–2	0–4
Atlas	1–1	3–2	—	2–1	3–0	5–1	1–1	2–2	0–0	0–2	3–3	1–1	4–2	2–2
Guadalajara	0–0	3–1	3–0	—	5–0	1–0	1–0	4–2	2–0	3–1	0–4	2–0	2–1	2–1
Irapuato	1–0	1–1	3–1	0–0	—	3–2	2–3	0–0	1–1	1–2	7–3	2–0	1–0	2–0
León	3–0	0–0	2–2	2–0	1–1	—	0–0	5–1	5–0	3–1	0–2	1–1	3–0	2–1
Monterrey	1–1	3–1	0–0	4–0	1–0	3–0	—	2–1	4–0	1–1	2–1	4–3	0–0	1–1
Morelia	0–3	3–2	0–0	1–4	1–1	0–1	2–0	—	3–1	0–0	2–2	3–1	1–1	3–3
Nacional	2–6	2–1	1–1	1–2	2–3	2–0	0–1	1–2	—	0–5	1–4	3–0	0–3	2–4
Necaxa	0–2	2–2	0–0	0–2	1–2	1–0	1–2	4–0	4–0	—	4–3	2–1	2–0	3–0
Oro	3–5	1–1	2–2	0–0	0–1	4–2	2–2	2–0	4–3	2–0	—	4–1	3–5	2–3
Toluca	1–1	3–0	2–1	1–1	2–2	4–0	1–2	2–0	1–1	1–1	0–0	—	2–0	0–1
UNAM	0–0	0–0	0–1	0–0	1–2	1–0	2–1	4–0	7–1	0–3	1–0	2–0	—	1–0
Zacatepec	2–1	0–2	6–0	2–0	2–4	0–0	2–1	0–0	3–1	1–0	1–2	0–0	4–2	—

Updated to match(es) played on 7 January 1964. Source: RSSSF
Legend: Blue = home team win; Yellow = draw; Red = away team win.

== Promotion tournament ==
In order to increase the number of team from 14 to 16 for the 1964-65 the league made a playoff. The top 2 teams would be in Primera Division. The playoff was composed of the lowest team from Primera division and the 2nd-5th teams in the standings from Segunda Division as Cruz Azul had earned automatic promotion. The playoff was played between January 16 and February 6 1964. All games were played in Estadio Olímpico Universitario, Mexico City.

Pos	Team	Pld	W	D	L	GF	GA	GD	Pts	Promotion
1	Nacional	3	1	2	0	4	3	+1	4	Remains in Primera Division
2	Veracruz	3	1	1	1	4	4	0	3	Earns promotion
3	Ciudad Madero	3	1	1	1	3	7	−4	3	
4	Poza Rica	3	1	0	2	9	6	+3	2	

=== Results ===
Local	Score	Visitor
Nacional	1-1	Ciudad Madero
Poza Rica	6-1	Ciudad Madero
Nacional	1-1	Veracruz
Veracruz	3-2	Poza Rica
Ciudad Madero	1-0	Veracruz
Nacional	2-1	Poza Rica
