= 1965–66 Mexican Segunda División season =

Segunda División de México
- Season: 1965–66
- Champions: Nuevo León (1st Title)
- Matches played: 241
- Goals scored: 801 (3.32 per match)

The 1965–66 Mexican Segunda División was the 16th season of the Mexican Segunda División. The season started on 29 May 1965 and concluded on 19 December 1965. It was won by Nuevo León, for the first time, the champion was defined in a tiebreaker match, in which Nuevo León defeated Tampico with a score of 2-1.

== Changes ==
- Ciudad Madero was promoted to Primera División.
- Nacional was relegated from Primera División.
- Chapingo Texcoco was renamed again as Texcoco de Mora.

== Teams ==
1965-66 Season Teams

Club	City	Stadium
Celaya	Celaya	Estadio Miguel Alemán Valdés
La Piedad	La Piedad	Estadio Juan N. López
Laguna	Torreón	Estadio San Isidro
Nacional	Guadalajara	Estadio Jalisco
Nuevo León	Monterrey	Estadio Tecnológico
Orizaba	Orizaba	Estadio Socum
Pachuca	Pachuca	Estadio Revolución Mexicana
Poza Rica	Poza Rica	Parque Jaime J. Merino
Puebla	Puebla	Estadio Olímpico Ignacio Zaragoza
Salamanca	Salamanca	Estadio El Molinito
Tampico	Tampico	Estadio Tampico
Tepic	Tepic	Estadio Nicolás Álvarez Ortega
Texcoco	Texcoco	Estadio Municipal de Texcoco
Torreón	Torreón	Estadio Revolución
Ciudad Victoria	Ciudad Victoria	Estadio Marte R. Gómez
Zamora	Zamora	Estadio Moctezuma

== League table ==
Pos	Team	Pld	W	D	L	GF	GA	GAv	Pts	Qualification or relegation
1	Tampico	30	21	5	4	72	26	2.769	47	Tiebreaker match
2	Nuevo León (C, P)	30	22	3	5	70	34	2.059	47	Promoted to Primera División
3	Pachuca	30	18	7	5	62	24	2.583	43	
4	Puebla	30	17	8	5	68	32	2.125	42	
5	Poza Rica	30	18	5	7	62	34	1.824	41	
6	Laguna	30	13	11	6	64	40	1.600	37	
7	Salamanca	30	12	7	11	45	39	1.154	31	
8	Torreón	30	12	6	12	48	47	1.021	30	
9	Ciudad Victoria	30	9	9	12	48	61	0.787	27	
10	Orizaba	30	8	8	14	36	48	0.750	24	
11	Nacional	30	9	5	16	38	60	0.633	23	
12	Tepic	30	4	12	14	31	49	0.633	20	
13	Zamora	30	6	7	17	45	75	0.600	19	
14	Texcoco	30	5	9	16	28	62	0.452	19	
15	La Piedad	30	5	6	19	40	76	0.526	16	
16	Celaya	30	5	4	21	41	91	0.451	14	

Source: RSSSF
(C) Champions; (P) Promoted

== Results ==
Home \ Away	CEL	LPD	LAG	NAC	NVL	ORI	PAC	PZR	PUE	SAL	TAM	TEP	TEX	TOR	VIC	ZAM
Celaya	—	1–2	2–3	1–1	1–4	0–1	1–3	1–2	1–3	1–2	1–3	2–1	3–1	3–3	2–2	2–1
La Piedad	1–2	—	2–2	4–2	1–3	3–2	0–2	2–2	0–2	1–2	0–1	2–0	1–2	3–2	2–2	3–3
Laguna	5–1	3–0	—	2–3	2–0	0–0	2–3	1–1	1–0	1–2	3–1	2–1	3–1	2–2	7–1	4–1
Nacional	3–4	1–1	0–0	—	1–1	2–1	1–3	1–2	2–3	1–2	0–2	1–0	2–0	3–2	0–1	1–2
Nuevo León	4–2	4–2	1–1	5–0	—	3–2	2–0	0–1	1–0	3–2	3–1	1–1	5–0	1–0	3–2	5–0
Orizaba	5–1	2–0	2–0	1–1	1–2	—	1–1	0–1	1–1	1–1	1–1	1–2	1–1	1–0	2–3	3–1
Pachuca	8–0	4–1	1–1	4–0	1–0	5–1	—	1–0	1–3	2–0	0–1	1–0	1–1	6–0	2–0	4–0
Poza Rica	7–2	4–1	2–1	3–2	5–0	4–1	0–0	—	2–1	2–1	0–1	3–2	6–0	0–1	2–3	2–0
Puebla	2–1	5–1	1–1	3–0	2–1	3–0	1–0	1–1	—	3–1	1–1	5–0	3–0	1–2	5–2	3–2
Salamanca	5–0	3–0	1–1	2–1	0–1	0–1	1–2	1–2	2–1	—	3–1	1–1	3–0	0–2	2–0	2–0
Tampico	4–0	5–1	3–0	5–0	1–2	3–0	2–0	3–1	2–2	4–0	—	4–1	5–1	1–0	2–0	2–1
Tepic	1–1	3–2	2–2	1–2	0–2	3–0	0–0	0–1	1–1	2–2	1–4	—	2–2	1–2	0–2	1–1
Texcoco	2–1	0–0	2–6	0–1	0–2	1–0	0–1	3–3	1–1	0–0	0–2	0–0	—	2–1	2–2	3–0
Torreón	3–1	5–0	1–2	2–0	2–6	2–0	1–2	1–0	3–3	1–1	0–3	0–0	3–1	—	0–0	5–1
Ciudad Victoria	4–1	5–3	1–1	2–3	2–3	0–1	1–1	2–1	1–5	2–2	1–1	1–3	2–1	0–1	—	3–2
Zamora	5–2	2–1	2–5	1–3	1–2	3–3	3–3	1–2	0–3	2–1	3–3	1–1	2–1	3–1	1–1	—

Source: RSSSF
Legend: Blue = home team win; Yellow = draw; Red = away team win.

== Tiebreaker Match ==
Due to the tie on points between Tampico and Nuevo León it was necessary to hold a tiebreaker match at a neutral venue. This was held on 26 December 1965 at the Estadio La Martinica, León.

26 December 1965	Nuevo León	2–1	Tampico	León
		Report		Stadium: Estadio La Martinica
