= 1964–65 Mexican Segunda División season =

Segunda División de México
- Season: 1964–65
- Champions: Ciudad Madero (1st Title)
- Matches played: 240
- Goals scored: 757 (3.15 per match)

The 1964–65 Mexican Segunda División was the 15th season of the Mexican Segunda División. The season started on 6 June 1964 and concluded on 27 December 1964. It was won by Ciudad Madero.

== Changes ==
- Cruz Azul was promoted to Primera División.
- Refinería Madero was renamed as Ciudad Madero.
- Puebla joined the league.
- Salamanca returned to the league after three seasons on hiatus.
- The Chapingo Autonomous University became co-owner of the C.D. Texcoco, for which the team was renamed as Chapingo Texcoco.

== Teams ==
1964-65 Season Teams

Club	City	Stadium
Celaya	Celaya	Estadio Miguel Alemán Valdés
Chapingo Texcoco	Texcoco	Estadio Municipal de Texcoco
La Piedad	La Piedad	Estadio Juan N. López
Laguna	Torreón	Estadio San Isidro
Ciudad Madero	Ciudad Madero	Estadio Tampico
Nuevo León	Monterrey	Estadio Tecnológico
Orizaba	Orizaba	Estadio Socum
Pachuca	Pachuca	Estadio Revolución Mexicana
Poza Rica	Poza Rica	Parque Jaime J. Merino
Puebla	Puebla	Estadio Olímpico Ignacio Zaragoza
Salamanca	Salamanca	Estadio El Molinito
Tampico	Tampico	Estadio Tampico
Tepic	Tepic	Estadio Nicolás Álvarez Ortega
Torreón	Torreón	Estadio Revolución
Ciudad Victoria	Ciudad Victoria	Estadio Marte R. Gómez
Zamora	Zamora	Estadio Moctezuma

== League table ==
Pos	Team	Pld	W	D	L	GF	GA	GAv	Pts	Qualification or relegation
1	Ciudad Madero (C, P)	30	23	7	0	69	23	3.000	53	Promoted to Primera División
2	Poza Rica	30	17	11	2	72	26	2.769	45	
3	Tampico	30	18	7	5	68	42	1.619	43	
4	Puebla	30	14	9	7	46	34	1.353	37	
5	Nuevo León	30	13	8	9	66	52	1.269	34	
6	Tepic	30	12	8	10	49	37	1.324	32	
7	Laguna	30	11	9	10	53	43	1.233	31	
8	Ciudad Victoria	30	12	7	11	40	39	1.026	31	
9	Torreón	30	11	6	13	39	57	0.684	28	
10	Pachuca	30	9	9	12	38	45	0.844	27	
11	Zamora	30	8	9	13	38	47	0.809	25	
12	Orizaba	30	9	6	15	51	62	0.823	24	
13	Celaya	30	8	8	14	33	47	0.702	24	
14	Chapingo Texcoco	30	5	9	16	33	65	0.508	19	
15	La Piedad	30	5	6	19	35	73	0.479	16	
16	Salamanca	30	0	11	19	27	65	0.415	11	

Source: RSSSF
(C) Champions; (P) Promoted

== Results ==
Home \ Away	CEL	CTE	LPD	LAG	MAD	NVL	ORI	PAC	PZR	PUE	SAL	TAM	TEP	TOR	VIC	ZAM
Celaya	—	5–0	1–1	1–0	0–1	0–0	3–1	0–0	1–1	1–2	0–0	0–2	1–1	1–2	1–0	2–0
Chapingo Texcoco	0–0	—	3–1	1–0	0–3	3–1	2–2	0–3	2–2	1–4	1–1	1–4	0–2	0–0	2–2	0–3
La Piedad	5–2	0–4	—	1–4	0–2	1–1	1–2	1–2	0–0	1–0	2–2	1–2	1–1	0–1	4–2	2–1
Laguna	1–0	3–0	6–0	—	2–3	2–0	4–1	1–1	1–2	1–1	2–2	3–1	2–1	0–0	3–0	3–1
Ciudad Madero	3–0	3–1	2–0	2–1	—	3–1	4–1	1–0	1–1	0–0	4–1	2–1	2–1	2–0	3–1	2–0
Nuevo León	3–0	5–2	3–1	5–1	2–2	—	3–1	5–2	3–1	1–1	0–0	3–3	1–1	5–0	2–0	5–1
Orizaba	0–0	0–3	3–2	2–2	2–2	3–1	—	2–0	0–2	0–2	2–1	1–2	4–0	3–0	4–0	3–3
Pachuca	2–1	2–0	2–1	2–2	1–3	2–1	1–1	—	2–2	3–1	4–3	1–4	1–1	2–0	0–1	2–2
Poza Rica	4–2	3–0	5–1	5–1	0–0	5–0	7–2	2–0	—	3–1	3–0	0–0	2–0	7–0	1–1	4–0
Puebla	3–1	2–1	3–1	2–2	1–1	1–4	2–1	1–0	2–0	—	0–0	3–1	1–0	4–1	2–2	2–2
Salamanca	2–4	2–2	2–3	2–2	1–4	0–2	1–5	0–0	1–2	1–2	—	2–2	0–1	0–2	1–2	0–1
Tampico	5–1	2–0	3–0	2–1	0–2	6–3	6–2	2–0	1–1	1–3	3–2	—	0–0	4–3	2–2	3–2
Tepic	4–0	5–1	6–2	2–1	2–3	2–2	1–0	2–1	0–0	1–0	5–2	1–2	—	1–3	1–0	5–1
Torreón	2–1	2–2	1–1	0–1	1–5	2–4	3–2	3–1	3–4	2–0	2–0	0–0	3–2	—	1–2	2–1
Ciudad Victoria	1–2	0–0	3–0	2–0	2–2	1–0	2–1	2–1	1–3	1–0	3–0	1–2	3–0	0–0	—	3–0
Zamora	1–2	3–1	4–1	1–1	0–2	5–0	2–0	0–0	0–0	0–0	0–0	1–2	0–0	2–0	1–0	—

Source: RSSSF
Legend: Blue = home team win; Yellow = draw; Red = away team win.
