= 1960–61 Mexican Segunda División season =

Segunda División de México
- Season: 1960–61
- Champions: Nacional (1st Title)
- Matches played: 380
- Goals scored: 1,234 (3.25 per match)

The 1960–61 Mexican Segunda División was the 11th season of the Mexican Segunda División. The season started on 2 July 1960 and concluded on 26 March 1961. It was won by Nacional.

== Changes ==
- Monterrey was promoted to Primera División.
- Zamora was relegated from Primera División.
- Pachuca re-joined the league, after eight years out. Also, Cataluña joined.
- Irapuatense was renamed as Vasco de Quiroga.
- Oviedo was renamed as Texcoco.

== Teams ==
1960-61 Season Teams

Club	City	Stadium
Cataluña	Torreón	Estadio San Isidro
Cuautla	Cuautla	Balneario El Almeal
La Piedad	La Piedad	Estadio Juan N. López
Laguna	Torreón	Estadio San Isidro
Nacional	Guadalajara	Parque Oro
Orizaba	Orizaba	Estadio Socum
Pachuca	Pachuca	Estadio Revolución Mexicana
Poza Rica	Poza Rica	Parque Jaime J. Merino
Querétaro	Querétaro	Estadio Municipal
Refinería Madero	Ciudad Madero	Estadio Tampico
Salamanca	Salamanca	Estadio El Molinito
San Luis	San Luis Potosí	Estadio Plan de San Luis
Tepic	Tepic	Estadio Nicolás Álvarez Ortega
Texcoco	Texcoco	Estadio Municipal de Texcoco
U. de N.L.	Monterrey	Estadio Tecnológico
UNAM	Mexico City	Estadio Olímpico Universitario
Valladolid	Morelia	Campo Independiente
Vasco de Quiroga	Irapuato	Estadio Revolución
Ciudad Victoria	Ciudad Victoria	Estadio Marte R. Gómez
Zamora	Zamora	Estadio Moctezuma

== League table ==
Pos	Team	Pld	W	D	L	GF	GA	GAv	Pts	Qualification or relegation
1	Nacional (C, P)	38	28	5	5	94	32	2.938	61	Promoted to Primera División
2	Poza Rica	38	23	9	6	75	36	2.083	55	
3	Refinería Madero	38	23	7	8	79	43	1.837	53	
4	Ciudad Victoria	38	19	12	7	76	39	1.949	50	
5	UNAM	38	20	7	11	64	41	1.561	47	
6	San Luis	38	17	12	9	66	41	1.610	46	
7	Querétaro	38	18	9	11	69	42	1.643	45	
8	Texcoco	38	17	11	10	70	64	1.094	45	
9	Tepic	38	16	10	12	66	52	1.269	42	
10	U. de N.L.	38	16	8	14	66	60	1.100	40	
11	Orizaba	38	14	10	14	57	62	0.919	38	
12	Laguna	38	14	8	16	69	64	1.078	36	
13	Zamora	38	15	6	17	66	63	1.048	36	
14	La Piedad	38	11	8	19	48	67	0.716	30	
15	Salamanca	38	10	8	20	62	74	0.838	28	
16	Cuautla	38	10	7	21	50	79	0.633	27	
17	Vasco de Quiroga	38	7	9	22	43	83	0.518	23	
18	Pachuca	38	7	9	22	41	91	0.451	23	
19	Valladolid	38	6	9	23	26	90	0.289	21	
20	Cataluña	38	5	4	29	47	111	0.423	14	

Source: RSSSF
(C) Champions; (P) Promoted

== Results ==
Home \ Away	CAT	CUA	LPD	LAG	NAC	ORI	PAC	PZR	QUE	RMA	SAL	SNL	TEP	TEX	UNL	UNM	VAL	VAS	VIC	ZAM
Cataluña	—	5–2	3–1	1–4	1–7	1–1	1–2	1–4	0–4	1–4	2–0	1–1	3–1	0–1	0–4	1–4	6–0	0–1	0–2	1–1
Cuautla	2–0	—	2–2	1–2	0–2	3–1	2–0	1–1	1–1	3–2	4–1	2–0	0–4	2–0	0–2	0–0	0–0	1–0	2–2	1–2
La Piedad	2–0	1–1	—	2–0	3–7	0–0	3–0	1–0	1–0	1–3	1–1	1–0	0–1	0–1	2–2	3–2	8–0	3–0	0–2	1–2
Laguna	1–1	3–2	1–1	—	3–1	1–3	3–1	1–2	5–0	0–2	2–1	1–2	6–3	1–1	2–2	1–2	8–1	1–0	1–3	4–2
Nacional	6–5	6–0	1–0	3–1	—	5–1	4–0	2–1	3–0	1–0	1–1	1–1	3–0	2–0	4–0	3–0	6–0	2–1	2–0	2–0
Orizaba	5–3	3–1	1–0	1–0	0–1	—	2–1	1–2	1–1	2–2	3–1	0–0	1–1	0–0	2–1	1–3	5–0	4–1	2–1	3–0
Pachuca	4–1	1–4	1–3	2–1	0–4	1–1	—	1–4	1–0	0–5	4–3	1–4	1–1	2–2	1–0	1–1	4–1	1–1	2–2	0–4
Poza Rica	4–0	2–1	2–1	5–0	3–1	2–1	3–1	—	1–1	1–2	1–0	1–1	1–1	2–1	2–1	0–0	6–0	4–1	4–1	3–2
Querétaro	2–1	3–1	4–0	0–0	3–0	3–0	3–0	0–1	—	6–0	4–0	2–2	0–2	4–0	2–1	2–1	1–1	4–0	1–1	3–1
Refinería Madero	5–2	5–1	0–2	2–0	2–0	1–1	2–0	2–1	0–2	—	5–0	1–0	1–1	2–1	5–0	0–0	2–0	5–0	2–1	1–0
Salamanca	5–0	1–0	5–0	5–2	1–4	2–1	4–1	0–1	1–1	2–2	—	0–1	4–4	3–1	2–2	2–3	4–0	0–3	1–1	4–2
San Luis	5–0	4–2	0–0	0–1	0–1	2–0	1–1	0–0	2–1	3–2	3–1	—	3–1	1–1	3–0	3–1	2–0	2–2	1–0	4–1
Tepic	3–1	1–0	4–0	1–1	1–1	2–0	1–1	0–0	2–1	3–2	3–1	3–1	—	1–1	3–0	3–1	2–0	2–2	1–0	4–1
Texcoco	5–3	3–2	3–1	3–3	2–1	2–2	3–3	2–2	0–2	4–1	2–1	3–1	5–1	—	2–2	2–0	4–1	2–1	1–1	3–2
U. de N.L.	5–0	3–0	2–1	0–4	0–1	5–2	3–0	2–1	2–1	3–2	2–1	1–1	3–0	5–4	—	0–1	2–2	2–1	1–1	1–0
UNAM	2–0	4–0	4–0	2–0	1–1	1–2	2–0	3–2	4–1	0–2	3–0	2–0	3–1	3–0	2–1	—	1–0	3–1	1–0	2–2
Valladolid	2–1	0–1	1–0	0–1	0–1	2–1	1–1	0–1	0–2	1–2	2–1	1–1	2–2	0–1	2–1	2–1	—	1–1	0–3	2–3
Vasco de Quiroga	3–0	3–2	2–2	0–0	1–3	1–2	2–0	1–1	1–2	2–2	1–4	1–7	0–2	1–2	2–1	3–2	0–0	—	0–3	2–2
Ciudad Victoria	3–0	5–2	3–1	4–3	0–0	7–1	4–0	1–1	1–0	0–0	2–0	4–0	3–0	3–3	0–0	1–0	2–0	4–2	—	1–1
Zamora	3–1	4–1	6–0	2–1	0–1	2–0	3–2	0–1	4–1	1–2	0–0	0–4	1–0	0–2	3–4	3–0	1–1	3–0	2–1	—

Source: RSSSF
Legend: Blue = home team win; Yellow = draw; Red = away team win.
