= Leopoldo Barba =

Mexican footballer (born 1941)

Personal information
- Full name: Leopoldo Barba Cortés
- Date of birth: 11 January 1941
- Place of birth: Juanacatlán, Jalisco, Mexico
- Position: Centre-forward

Senior career*
| Years | Team | Apps | (Gls) |
| 1959–1961 | Nacional | | |
| 1961–1969 | Jabatos de Nuevo León | | |
| 1969–1971 | Tigres UANL | | |
| 1971–1972 | Jalisco | | |
| 1972–1973 | Veracruz | | |
| 1973–1974 | Tigres UANL | | |

International career
| 1969 | Mexico | 5 | (1) |
- * Club domestic league appearances and goals

Leopoldo Barba Cortés (born 11 January 1941) is a retired Mexican footballer. Nicknamed "Polo", he was known for playing for Jabatos de Nuevo León throughout the 1960s as well as Tigres UANL in the early 1970s as a centre-forward. He also represented Mexico internationally for the 1969 CONCACAF Championship.

== Club career ==
Barba began his career with Nacional for the 1960–61 Mexican Segunda División under manager Javier Novello. He then spent the majority of the 1960s playing for Jabatos de Nuevo León and contributed to their promotion during the 1965–66 Mexican Segunda División as well as the decisive 2–1 victory against Tampico with goals from Hilario Portales and Rubén Ceja. He soon departed from the club after their relegation during the 1968–69 Mexican Primera División as he played for Tigres UANL for the early 1970s. He then returned to Monterrey after brief stints with Jalisco and Veracruz as he was part of the winning squad of the 1973–74 Mexican Segunda División that would earn them promotion to the top-flight of Mexican football though Barba would retire following the season's conclusion.

== International career ==
Barba was called up to represent Mexico for the 1969 CONCACAF Championship after appearing within the qualifiers. He made 5 appearances throughout the tournament with Barba scoring the equalizer against Netherlands Antilles on 2 December 1969.

== Personal life ==
Leopoldo is the eldest brother of the Barba Cortés family with Leonardo following him soon after as he similarly played for Nacional and Jalisco throughout the 1970s.
