= Javier García Lomelí =

Mexican footballer (born 1939)

Personal information
- Full name: Javier García Lomelí
- Date of birth: 2 January 1943 (age 83)
- Place of birth: Juanacatlán, Jalisco, Mexico
- Position: Right-back

Senior career*
Years	Team	Apps	(Gls)
1962–1963	Oro		
1966–1969	Jabatos de Nuevo León		
1969–1970	Torreón		
1970–1972	Monterrey		
1972–1974	Veracruz		
1973–1974	→ Ciudad Madero (loan)		
1974–1976	Tampico		

International career
1969	Mexico	0	(0)
- * Club domestic league appearances and goals

Javier García Lomelí (born 2 January 1943) is a Mexican former footballer. Nicknamed "El Matasietes", he played as a right-back for Jabatos de Nuevo León and Tampico throughout the 1960s and the 1970s. He also represented Mexico for the 1969 CONCACAF Championship.

== Club career ==
García began his senior career with Oro for the 1962–63 Mexican Primera División season where he made his debut in a 1–1 draw against 29 July 1962 against Deportivo Toluca. Despite being part of the only winning squad in the club's history that won the tournament that season, he was not renewed for an additional contract due to tight competition from other players such as Felipe Ruvalcaba, Rogelio González Navarro, Nicola Gravina, Amaury Epaminondas Manoel Tavares Necco, and spent the following few seasons without an active club. It wouldn't be until the 1966–67 Mexican Primera División season where he would sign with Jabatos de Nuevo León after club forward Leonardo Barba had recommended him to them. After playing with the club until their relegation in the 1968–69 Mexican Primera División season. This then prompted him to play for Torreón for a season before sticking with Monterrey for the subsequent three seasons. He spent his final seasons with Veracruz, Ciudad Madero and Tampico before retiring after the 1975–76 Mexican Segunda División season.

== International career ==
García was called up to play in the 1969 CONCACAF Championship as a substitute player but wouldn't make any appearances throughout the tournament.
