= Claudio Lostaunau =

Peruvian footballer and manager (1939–2016)

Personal information
- Full name: Claudio Lostaunau Bravo
- Date of birth: 1 March 1939
- Place of birth: Lima, Peru
- Date of death: 21 November 2016 (aged 77)
- Place of death: Monterrey, Mexico
- Position: Midfielder

Senior career*
Years	Team	Apps	(Gls)
1956–1959	Deportivo Municipal		
1960–1965	C.F. Monterrey		
1965–1967	Deportivo Toluca		
1967–1969	C.F. Monterrey		
1969–1973	C.F. Laguna		
1973–1974	Club Jalisco		

International career
1959	Peru	1	(0)

Managerial career
- 1975–1976: Tigres UANL
- 1977–1978: Atlas F.C.
- 1980: Tigres UANL
- 1997: C.F. Monterrey
- * Club domestic league appearances and goals

Claudio Lostaunau Bravo (Lima, 1 March 1939 – Monterrey, 21 November 2016) was a Peruvian professional footballer who played as midfielder before becoming manager.

Nicknamed El Maestro (the master), this cerebral midfielder is considered one of the best foreign players in Mexican football during the 1960s.

== Playing career ==
Having made his name as a midfielder with Deportivo Municipal in the late 1950s, Claudio Lostaunau was spotted by Mario Castillejos, a director at C.F. Monterrey, who brought him to Mexico in 1960. He played for Rayados de Monterrey until 1965 before signing for Deportivo Toluca.

It was with Toluca that he achieved his greatest success, becoming the playmaker for the Toluca team that won the Mexican championship in the 1966–67 season. Returning to C.F. Monterrey, he remained there until 1969. He then signed for C.F. Laguna (where he played for four seasons) before ending his football career playing for Club Jalisco in the 1973–74 season.

Called up by coach György Orth, Claudio Lostaunau was part of the Peruvian squad competing in the 1959 South American Championship in Argentina. He played only one match, against Chile, on 21 March 1959 (1–1).

== Managerial career ==
Claudio Lostaunau began his coaching career with Tigres UANL, winning the Mexican Cup in 1975. In 1977–78, he coached Atlas F.C. but was unable to prevent the club's relegation.

He returned to Tigres UANL in 1980 and lost in the Mexican Championship final to Cruz Azul. He had one last stint as a coach with C.F. Monterrey in 1997.

== Death ==
Lostaunau died at his home in Monterrey on 21 November 2016, at the age of 77.

== Honours ==
=== Player ===
Deportivo Toluca

- Mexican Primera División: 1966–67

=== Manager ===
Tigres UANL

- Copa MX: 1975–76
