= Estadio Heriberto Jara Corona =

Sports venue in Poza Rica, Mexico

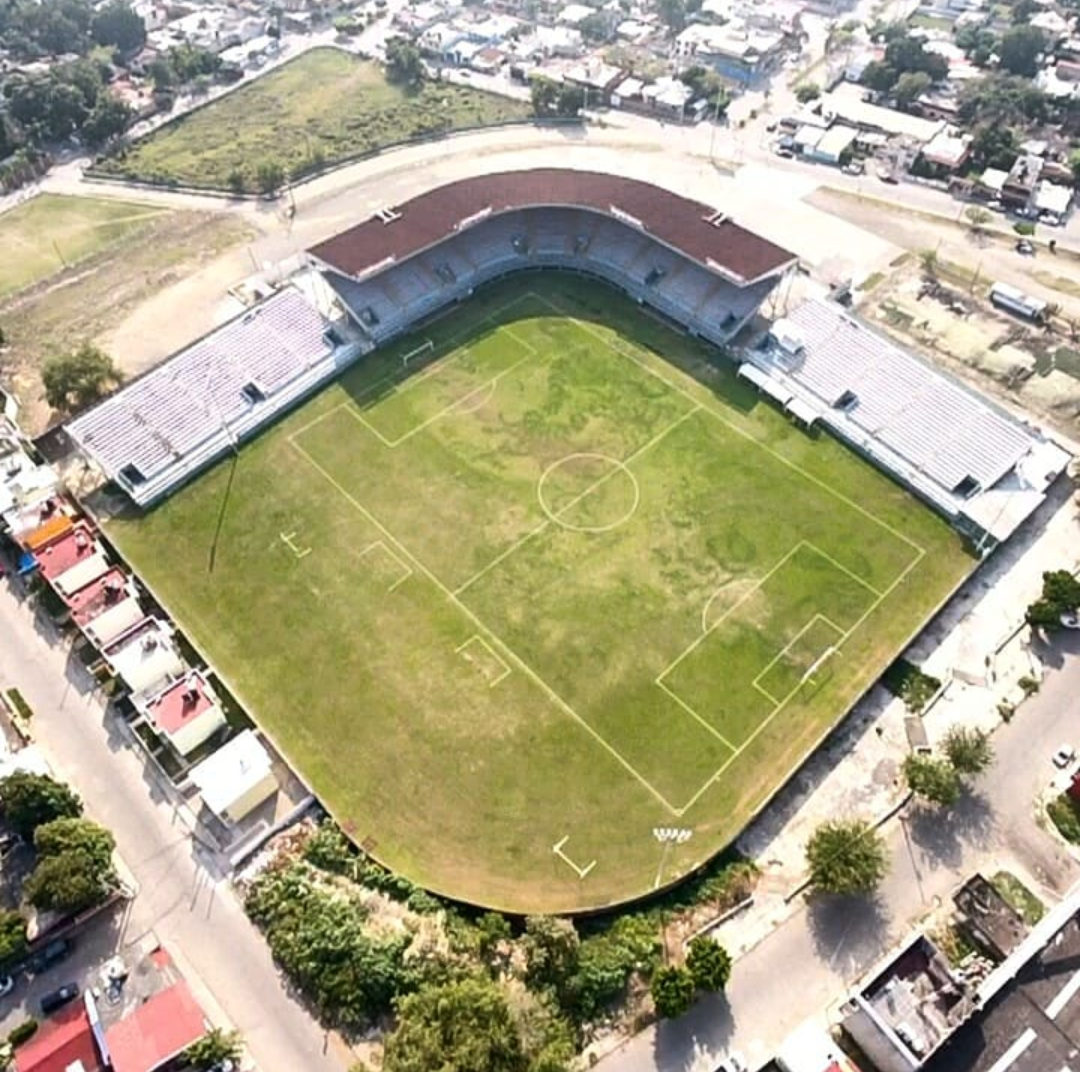
- Interactive map of Estadio Heriberto Jara Corona
- Full name: Estadio Heriberto Jara Corona
- Location: Poza Rica, Veracruz, Mexico
- Coordinates: 20.5294°N 97.4302°W
- Owner: City of Poza Rica
- Capacity: 10,000
- Surface: Natural grass

Construction
- Opened: 1969
- Renovated: 2022

Tenants
- C.D. Poza Rica (1969–); Petroleros de Poza Rica (LMB)(1970–2006)

Estadio Heriberto Jara Corona is a multi-use stadium in Poza Rica, Veracruz, Mexico. It is currently used mostly for football and baseball matches. The stadium has a capacity 10,000 people and opened in 1969. The stadium was named after the revolutionary, naval officer and politician Heriberto Jara Corona, who was originally from Veracruz.
