= 1966–67 Mexican Primera División season =

24th professional season of the top-flight football league in Mexico

Primera División de México
- Season: 1966–67
- Champions: Toluca (1st title)
- Relegated: Ciudad Madero
- Champions' Cup: Toluca
- Matches: 220
- Goals: 633 (2.88 per match)

Statistics of the México Primera División for the 1966–67 season.

== Overview ==
Nuevo León was promoted to Primera División.

The season was contested by 16 teams, and Toluca won the championship.

Ciudad Madero was relegated to Segunda División.

=== Teams ===
Location of the 1966-67 Primera División teams

Team	City	Stadium
América	Mexico City	Azteca
Atlante	Mexico City	Azteca
Atlas	Guadalajara, Jalisco	Jalisco
Ciudad Madero	Ciudad Madero, Tamaulipas	Tamaulipas
Cruz Azul	Jasso, Hidalgo	10 de Diciembre
Guadalajara	Guadalajara, Jalisco	Jalisco
Irapuato	Irapuato, Guanajuato	Revolución
León	León, Guanajuato	La Martinica / León (Note: The team played until Week 12 in the Estadio La Martinica, from Week 13 moved to its new venue, the Estadio León.)
Morelia	Morelia, Michoacán	Venustiano Carranza
Monterrey	Monterrey, Nuevo León	Tecnológico
Necaxa	Mexico City	Azteca
Nuevo León	Monterrey, Nuevo León	Tecnológico
Oro	Guadalajara, Jalisco	Jalisco
Toluca	Toluca, State of Mexico	Luis Gutiérrez Dosal
UNAM	Mexico City	Ciudad de los Deportes (Note: The team moved from the Estadio Olímpico Universitario, due to the preparation works for the celebration of the 1968 Summer Olympics. UNAM also played some games in Estadio Azteca.)
Veracruz	Veracruz, Veracruz	Parque Deportivo Veracruzano

== League standings ==
Pos	Team	Pld	W	D	L	GF	GA	GD	Pts	Qualification or relegation
1	Toluca	30	17	7	6	48	24	+24	41	Champions
2	América	30	14	11	5	46	29	+17	39	
3	Guadalajara	30	12	10	8	36	28	+8	34	
4	Necaxa	30	11	12	7	48	36	+12	34	
5	León	30	14	6	10	43	38	+5	34	
6	Nuevo León	30	11	10	9	36	30	+6	32	
7	Atlas	30	9	13	8	41	37	+4	31	
8	Monterrey	30	10	10	10	35	34	+1	30	
9	Irapuato	30	10	10	10	28	35	−7	30	
10	Cruz Azul	30	10	9	11	45	42	+3	29	
11	Oro	30	9	9	12	38	44	−6	27	
12	Atlante	30	11	4	15	34	36	−2	26	
13	UNAM	30	7	12	11	45	53	−8	26	
14	Veracruz	30	7	11	12	45	55	−10	25	
15	Morelia	30	8	8	14	32	51	−19	24	
16	Ciudad Madero	30	5	8	17	33	61	−28	18	Relegated

Source: rsssf.com

1966–67 winners

1st title

== Results ==
Home \ Away	AME	ATE	ATS	CAZ	GDL	IRA	LEO	CMA	MTY	MOR	NEC	JNL	ORO	TOL	UNM	VER
América	—	1–1	0–0	5–3	2–1	0–0	1–1	5–1	0–1	2–0	1–0	1–1	1–0	0–0	5–1	6–4
Atlante	0–1	—	0–1	1–2	3–0	0–0	2–1	0–0	2–0	3–0	1–2	2–1	3–1	2–0	0–1	2–1
Atlas	1–1	2–1	—	1–1	1–1	0–1	2–1	1–0	3–0	1–1	3–0	3–0	1–0	2–1	3–3	1–3
Cruz Azul	2–3	1–2	1–1	—	1–0	4–1	0–1	2–0	2–0	3–1	0–0	0–0	2–3	1–3	4–1	5–1
Guadalajara	0–0	1–0	2–2	1–1	—	1–0	2–0	3–0	0–0	3–1	1–1	0–0	1–0	0–2	3–1	3–3
Irapuato	0–1	1–0	1–0	1–1	1–2	—	3–1	1–1	1–0	2–0	2–1	2–0	0–0	1–1	0–1	3–3
León	2–1	1–0	0–0	1–2	2–0	4–1	—	3–0	0–0	0–1	2–1	0–3	2–2	2–0	1–1	1–0
Ciudad Madero	1–4	3–2	1–1	0–1	3–0	5–2	1–3	—	1–2	2–1	1–3	0–3	2–2	1–3	2–2	2–2
Monterrey	2–0	1–2	2–1	1–0	0–1	0–0	1–2	3–1	—	2–0	1–1	2–2	2–2	0–0	1–1	1–1
Morelia	0–1	2–1	3–2	0–0	1–5	0–1	1–1	3–0	1–0	—	1–1	2–1	2–2	1–0	2–2	3–2
Necaxa	1–1	2–0	4–3	2–1	0–2	2–0	4–0	4–0	3–1	1–1	—	1–1	4–0	1–1	2–1	0–2
Nuevo León	0–0	1–0	3–1	3–0	1–1	1–1	1–2	0–1	0–3	1–0	1–1	—	1–0	0–1	3–2	1–1
Oro	0–1	0–2	2–2	1–1	1–0	2–0	3–2	1–0	2–5	4–2	0–0	0–2	—	3–0	2–3	1–0
Toluca	1–0	3–1	0–0	2–0	1–1	3–0	3–1	2–2	4–2	4–0	2–0	2–1	1–0	—	2–1	4–0
UNAM	4–1	5–0	1–1	4–2	0–1	1–1	1–4	0–0	1–1	0–0	2–2	1–4	1–3	0–2	—	3–1
Veracruz	1–1	1–1	3–1	2–2	1–0	0–1	1–2	3–2	0–1	4–2	4–4	0–1	1–1	1–0	0–0	—

Updated to match(es) played on 19 February 1967. Source: RSSSF
Legend: Blue = home team win; Yellow = draw; Red = away team win.
