= C.D. Zapata =

Mexican football club

Club Deportivo Zapata
- Full name: Club Deportivo Zapata
- Nickname: Caudillos
- Founded: 1967
- Ground: Municipal de Emiliano Zapata, Emiliano Zapata, Morelos, Mexico
- Chairman: Carlos Francisco Salazar
- Manager: Adolfo Misarte
- League: Tercera División de México
Home colours	Away colours

Club Deportivo Zapata is a Mexican football club that plays in group 4 in the Tercera División de México. The club is based in Emiliano Zapata, Morelos, Mexico is one of the original Clubs that inaugurated the Tercera División de México in 1967–68 been the first champions.

== History ==
The club was founded in 1967 as Club Deportivo Zapata A.C playing out of Jojutla. The club's first game was played in the 1967-78 Tercera División de México tournament against Club Deportivo Las Brisas. That year's successful tournament led them to Promotion to the Segunda División de México.

The club changed owners in 2007 along with name, they are now known as Astros Zapata and are affiliated with Astros de Cuernavaca who played in the Segunda División de México.

== See also ==
- Football in Mexico
