= Estadio Plan de San Luis Potosí =

Multi-use stadium in San Luis Potosí, Mexico

- Coloso de Alamitos "Colossus of Alamitos"
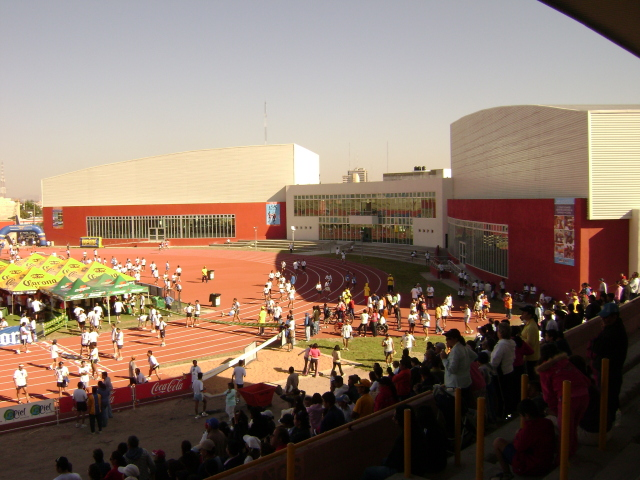
- Interactive map of Estadio Plan de San Luis Potosí
- Full name: Estadio Plan de San Luis Potosí
- Location: San Luis Potosí, Mexico
- Coordinates: 22.1413913°N 100.9851587°W
- Owner: Government of the State of San Luis Potosí
- Capacity: 18,000

Construction
- Opened: 20 November 1957; 68 years ago

Tenants
- San Luis F.C. (1957-2002); Atlético Potosino (1972-1991); Santos de Soledad (2013-2017); FC Potosino (2018–2019); Atlético San Luis Premier (2020–2021)

Estadio Plan de San Luis Potosí was a multi-use stadium in San Luis Potosí, Mexico. It was initially used as the stadium of San Luis F.C. matches. It was replaced by the current Estadio Alfonso Lastras in 2002. The capacity of the stadium was 18,000 spectators. In 2006, the government carried out remodeling work on the stadium, the north stand was demolished and a high performance sports center was built.

It was used by Atlético de San Luis for training sessions.

The stadium was also used by Atlético Potosino, Santos de San Luis and Atlético San Luis reserve team.

Between 2018 and 2019, it was used by FC Potosino, which plays in Serie B de México. Since February 2020 it's used by Atlético San Luis Premier, which plays in Serie A de México.
