= Estadio Agustín "Coruco" Díaz =

Football stadium in Zacatepec, Morelos

Agustín "Coruco" Díaz
- Nuevo "Coruco" Díaz "New "Coruco" Díaz"; La Selva Cañera "The Cane Jungle"
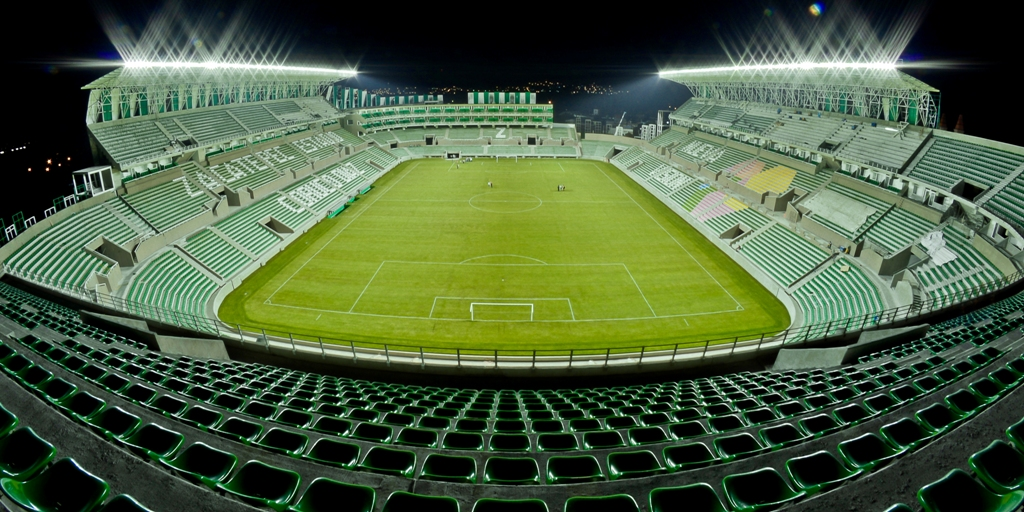
- Interactive map of Agustín "Coruco" Díaz
- Full name: Estadio Agustín "Coruco" Díaz
- Coordinates: 18.6551°N 99.1921°W
- Owner: Municipal Government of Zacatepec de Hidalgo, Morelos
- Capacity: 24,313
- Surface: grass
- Field size: 105 x 68 m

Construction
- Opened: 30 November 1964
- Renovated: Mid 2014
- Expanded: from 16,000
- Cost: MXN$500 Million

Tenants
- Zacatepec (1964–2020, 2024); Escorpiones Zacatepec (2023–2024); Atlante (2025–2026)

Estadio Agustín "Coruco" Díaz is a football stadium in Zacatepec de Hidalgo, Mexico, named in honour of the local player Agustín "Coruco" Díaz. It has a capacity of 16,000 seats and it was home to the team Cañeros de Zacatepec (Sugar cane growers).

This stadium is one of the oldest in Mexico and its origins can be traced back to 1948. It is located in Zacatepec, Morelos. The official opening of this stadium was in November 1954. This stadium is nicknamed the Selva Cañera ("Sugar Cane Jungle") because of the tropical weather that distinguish the municipality of Zacatepec. There was a famous player and later coach named Ignacio Trelles, who ordered the watering of the field one hour before the football match, leading to a very strong vaporization and an increase of the temperature to near 40 Celsius (more or less 100 Fahrenheit), which was very hard for the visitor squads. Another oddity of this building is that is it located in the center of the town of Zacatepec, beside the sugar cane refineries.

== See also ==
- List of football stadiums in Mexico
