= Zacatepec, Morelos =

Coordinates: 18°41′N 99°11′W

Zacatepec Zacatepec de Hidalgo
- Town and Municipality
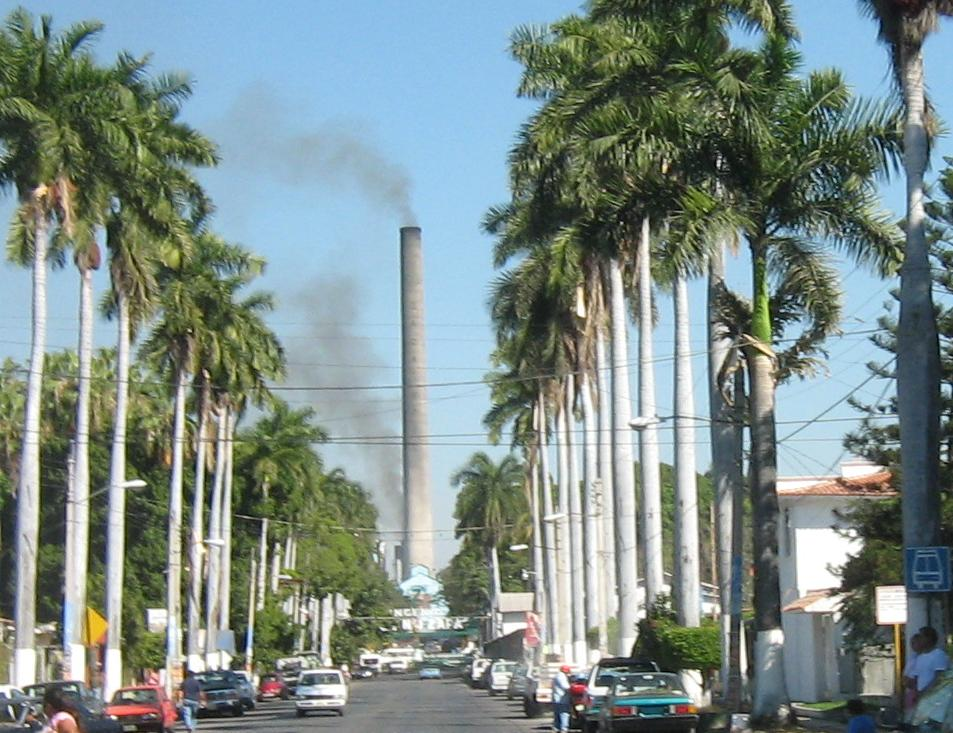
- View of a Zacatepec de Hidalgo street lined with palm trees, with the sugar mill in the distance

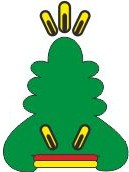
- Coat of arms

- Location in Mexico
- Country: Mexico
- State: Morelos
- Municipality: December 25, 1938

Government
  - Type: Municipality
  - President: Olivia Ramírez Lamadrid (Panal)

Area
  - Total: 2,853 km^{2} (1,102 sq mi)
  - Water: 84 km^{2} (32 sq mi)
  - Agriculture: 1,175 km^{2} (454 sq mi)
  - Industrial: 806 km^{2} (311 sq mi)
- Elevation: 917 m (3,009 ft)

Population (2015)
  - Total: 36,159
- Time zone: UTC-6 (Central Zone)
- Postal code: 62780, 62785
- Area code: 734

Zacatepec de Hidalgo (Zacatepec from the Nahuatl Zacatl meaning grass and tepetl meaning hill, thus loosely meaning "grassy hill") is a town in the state of Morelos, Mexico. It is bordered by Puente de Ixtla, Tlaltizapán, Tlaquiltenango and Jojutla. Miguel Hidalgo was the priest whose call to arms on September 16, 1810, led to the Mexican War of Independence.

The town serves as the local seat for the government, with which it shares the name. The municipality reported 36,159 inhabitants in the 2015 census.

The main industry in the town and its surrounding countryside is that of sugar cane cultivation and processing. The most notable feature of the town is the sugar mill located in its center and during operating hours the air of the settlement is laden with the smell of sugar.

Students come from surrounding parts of Morelos to study at the public university, the Instituto Tecnológico de Zacatepc, which is located on a site adjacent to the sugar mill.

== History ==
In pre-Columbian times Zacatepec was under the Tlahuica lordship of Cuauhnahuac (Cuernavaca). According to the tribute registration and to the list of tributary towns to Texcoco, analyzed by Blanca Maldonado, Zacatepec and Tetelpa were characterized by being a cotton-producing town with irrigation infrastructure tribute to the Triple Alliance (Acolhuas, Tepanecas, and Mexicas) dominant in the Valley of Mexico, from its total subordination in the year of 1437 during the Itzcoatl Empire.

After the conquest, Zacatepec fell under the jurisdiction of the Count of Oaxaca. After the Spanish conquest, evangelization of the area was the responsibility of the convent of Santo Domingo de Tlaquiltenango. In 1619, Pedro Cortés, Marqués del Valle, granted Juan Fernández Moradillo, 200 hectares of land along the Tetelpa river. Over the years, the land and sugar refinery passed to Diego de Mendoza, his son-in-law Mateo de Lizama his son-in-law, and Manuel Francisco de Verazategui. The lands of Zacatepec continued to belong to the convent of Santo Domingo de Tlaquiltenango; Manuel Francisco de Verazategui didn't pay his taxes in 1722, so the archbishop of Mexico City seized the land and granted power to Pablo de Arizabalo to sell it. The mill was acquired in 1741, by Blas Andreu de Olivan, along with the sugar mill of Santa Rosa Thirty Pesos.

The local civil authority at this time was in the town of Tetala, not Zacatepec; there is further evidence of this in an 1804 lawsuit against Domingo Coloma, owner of the hacienda of San Nicolás (today Galeana) and an alleged land grab. His defense? " [The peasants] earn more than they need… [they are] busy in various activities such as fishing for catfish, trout, roncal, and corbina… and [working as] muleteers and couriers." After all, the peasants were "far from being landless, they have leased them" and "at the moment several pieces are seen of public and notorious that their tenants planted of indigo". The peasants raised cattle and pigs; they grew corn, sesame, melons, watermelons, bananas, chilies, peanuts, tomatoes, avocados, prickly zapote, lemons, and oranges.

The independence of Mexico put Zacatepec in the State of Mexico until the creation of the State of Morelos in 1869.

On February 5, 1938, President Lázaro Cárdenas inaugurated, in what was once the hull of the old hacienda, the installations of the sugar mill that he had ordered to build, with social purposes, to improve the conditions of the ejidatarios and workers of the factory. Within this context was born the decision to elevate the municipality to Zacatepec. Thus, on December 25, 1938, the Governor of Morelos Elpidio Perdomo, promulgated Decree No. 17 whereby: "Art. 1 .- The free municipality of Zacatepec, Morelos is created, which will be formed with the extension comprising the assistantships of Tetelpa, Galeana (the former hacienda of San Nicolás) and Zacatepec, the latter being the head of the aforementioned municipality and retaining each of them the denomination and limits that they currently have ".

Zacatepec was one of the hardest-hit communities in Morelos state during the September 9, 2017 earthquake; ten people died, 884 homes were damaged; nearly half of which were totally destroyed.

Olivia Ramirez Lamadrid of Panal (New Alliance) was elected Presidente Municipal (mayor) on July 1, 2018.

The state of Morelos reported 505 infections and 59 deaths due to the COVID-19 pandemic in Mexico; nine infections were reported in Zacatepec as of May 4. Schools and many businesses were closed from mid March until June 1. The figures went up to 1,238 cases and 238 deaths on May 25; Zacatepec reported 36 cases. The local IMSS hospital mistakenly delivered two corpses to the wrong families on May 12. On June 6, Zacatepec reported 58 infections and 15 deaths from the virus; the reopening of the state was pushed back until at least June 13. Zacatepec reported 181 cases, 128 recuperations, and 4 deaths from the virus as of August 31. David Suayfeta, a doctor at the local IMSS hospital, was burned to death when an explosive device was thrown at his car on November 21. Three hundred thirty-seven cases were reported on December 27, 2020.

Former municipal president Francisco Salinas Sánchez (2015–2018) was arrested on corruption charges on August 5, 2020.

== Points of interest ==
There are a number of parks and gardens in Zacatepec, such as the "Miguel Hidalgo" garden in the zócalo of the municipality; the Liberal Garden located between the lienzo charro (rodeo) and the sugar mill on Morelos street; and the "Maestra Toyita Park", located on the outskirts of Tetelpa. There are spas such as Real de San Nicolás in Galeana (with 8 swimming pools) and Iguazú (with 7 pools) in Tetelpa.

The festivals of Zacaptepec are June 29 in honor of the town's patron, "San Pedro Apóstol"; December 8 in honor of the Virgin of the Immaculate Conception; and December 13 to commemorate when Father Mariano Matamoros rose in arms for independence in 1810. Traditional festivals are accompanied by Chinelo dancers and brass bands, as well as dances of Tecuanes and Apaches. Traditional foods are white pork pozole, Chito, pork barbacoa, mixiote (steamed) fish, tamales, and clemole (meat and vegetable soup) seasoned with wild plum and tamarind.

The Cerro de la Tortuga state park in the Ejido de Tetelpa is one of the last remnants of low deciduous forest in the center-south of the State of Morelos and is the last ecosystem with wild plants and animals of the Municipality of Zacatepec. It features a ceremonial center, the church of San Esteban Tetelpa, and a community museum.

== Communities of Zacatepec ==
The principal economic activities of the municipal seat of Zacatepec of Hidalgo are farming (sorghum, corn, beans), ranching (cattle, goats, poultry, and pigs). The approximate number of inhabitants is 3,700. Its cultural attractions are the church of San Pedro and the museum of the priest Mariano Matamoros. Its trade is the production and sale of crystallized sweets.

San Nicolás Galeana has a population of 10,071. It is located at 930 meters above sea level. There are three preschools, two elementary primarias (grades 1–6), one secundaria (middle school, grades 7–9), one preparatoria (high school, grades 10–12), and one teachers' college (Universidad Pedagogica Nacional 17-1 Subsede Galeana).

San Antonio Chiverías has a population of 1,031 and is located 945 at an altitude of 945 meters. There is one preschool, one elementary school, and one middle school. Its principal economic activities are farming (rice, sorghum, and corn) and ranching (cattle, goats, pigs, and chickens).

== Geography ==
=== Location, altitude and area ===
Zacatepec is located in south-central Morelos at North 18°41' North and 99°11' West. It borders Puente de Ixtla and Tlaltizapán on the north, Tlaltizapán and Jojutla on the east, Jojutla on the south, and Jojutla and Puente de Ixtla to the west. It has an area of 26.3 km^{2} (10.2 sq mi) that represents 0.5% of the total state of Morelos.

=== Climate ===
Zacatepec is semi-dry with a poorly defined winter, dry fall, winter, and early spring, and a rainy season from June to October. The average temperature is 24.5 °C (76.1 °F) and annual precipitation averages 844 mm (33 1/4 in).

=== Relief and waterways ===
Most of the municipality is in a valley and there are no mountains. The Cerro de La Tortuga (Turtle Hill) is located at 18°40' West and 99°13' North at an altitude 917 meters (3,009 feet)above sea level. Cerro de la Tortuga is one of the last remnants of low deciduous forest in the center-south of the State of Morelos and is the last ecosystem with wild plants and animals of the Municipality of Zacatepec. Many of these species have high medicinal, craft, food, ornamental, or commercial uses. The area is a state park in the Ejido de Tetelpa and covers 310.2 hectares (767 acres). There is a ceremonial center, the church of San Esteban Tetelpa, and a community museum. Part of the park is in Xoxocotla, Puente de Ixtla.

The Apatlaco River crosses a small part of the municipality, passing Zacatepec, Tetelpa, and Galeana.

=== Natural resources ===
There is a quarry near the Cerro del Venado (Deer Hill) in the eastern part of the municipality. 68% (1,175 hectares (2,900 acres)) of the land is cropland (sugar cane, rice, peanuts, watermelon, and melon), 14.5% is forest, and 18% other uses (84 hectares (210 acres) fishing, 806 hectares (1,990 acres) industrial).

=== Flora and fauna ===
Much of Zacatepec consists of deciduous forest, of warm climate; jacaranda, tabachín, casahuate (a medium-sized tree with white flowers), ceiba (a very large grayish-green tree with pink or white flowers that provide fruit) and bougainvillea. Wild animals include white-tailed deer, boar of collar, raccoon, badger, skunk, armadillo, hare, common rabbit, coyote, wildcat, weasel, cacomixtle, tlacuache (a member of the raccoon family), and bats, flagged bird, chachalaca, magpie copetona, vulture, aura (buzzard), crow, owl, and songbirds and ornamental birds.

Agricultural crops include sugar cane, rice, corn, and beans. Fruit crops include mangoes, avocados, and guavas. Cattle, pork, sheep, and horses are ranched; poultry are also raised.

== Sports ==
Zacatepec de Hidalgo has a football team, named Club Atlético Zacatepec, nicknamed Cañeros (Sugarcane growers). Their colors are white and green. Their uniform color is a white shirt with a big green line in the midsection and white shorts and socks. Their greatest achievements were in the 1950s when Zacatepec won two titles in Primera División de México (Mexico First Division): 1954–1955 season and 1957–1958 season. They were runners-up in the 1952–1953 season when they lost the league championship to Tampico. Zacatepec won the Copa Mexico (Mexico Cup) in the 1958–1959 season. The team plays in Tercera División de México (Third Division).

The head coach of Zacatepec during the 1950s was the Mexican Ignacio Trelles, who later became head coach of the Mexico national team in the 1962 FIFA World Cup in Chile and 1966 FIFA World Cup in England.

Agustin "Coruco" Diaz stadium is the home venue of Zacatepec, founded in November 1954. It was inaugurated by the then-president of Mexico Adolfo López Mateos. The stadium is euphemistically called "la selva cañera" (the sugarcane jungle), due to Zacatepec's humid weather conditions. Zacatepec's motto is Hacer Deporte es Hacer Patria which means Doing sports is to be a patriot.

=== Honours ===
- First Division championships: 2 (1954–1955 and 1957–1958)
- Cup championships: 1 (1958–1959)
- Second Division championships: 5 (1950–1951, 1962–1963, 1969–1970, 1977–1978, 1983–1984)

== Sister cities ==
- Turnov, Czech Republic
- (Cuba) Cerro, Havana

== See also ==
- List of people from Morelos
