= Coras FC =

Mexican football club

Coras F.C.
- Full name: Coras Fútbol Club
- Nicknames: Los Coras (The Coras; El Tornado del País (The Tornado of the Country)
- Founded: 19 July 1959; 66 years ago (as Deportivo Tepic); 24 March 2014; 12 years ago (as Coras Fútbol Club)
- Dissolved: 5 July 2024; 23 months ago
- Ground: Estadio Sección 123; Piedras Negras, Coahuila
- Capacity: 6,000
- Owner: Noé Quintanilla
- Chairman: Noé Quintanilla
- Manager: Elías Mdahuar
- League: Liga Premier (Serie A)
- 2023–24: Regular phase: 17th (Group I); Final phase: Did not qualify
Home colours	Away colours

Coras Fútbol Club, simplified as Coras FC and also known as Coras de Tepic, was a Mexican professional football club based in Tepic, Nayarit until its relocation. It competed in Liga Premier, the second level division of Mexican football, and played its home matches at the Estadio Sección 123. Founded in 1950 as Deportivo Tepic, the club changed its name to Club Universidad de Nayarit in 1971, later renamed as Chivas Coras in 2006, and finally it changed to its current name in 2014. The club was relocated to Piedras Negras, Coahuila in 2023, and was later dissolved in 2024.

== History ==
The club was founded on July 19, 1959 by Francisco Mengibar Bueno in Tepic, Nayarit and quickly joined the Segunda División de México. The club played mostly in the Mexican inferior division from 1960 to the 1980s. In 1986, the club was invited to play the Copa de Oro de Occidente with Primera División and Segunda División clubs based in the mid-western region of the country.

In 1994, the club was invited to play the first tournament in the newly created Primera División 'A' de México. The club struggled during its first year and was relegated back to the Segunda División de México after the 1995–96 tournament. In 2002 the club won the Apertura 2002 tournament in Segunda División de México. The club has been playing on and off ever since and recently built a new stadium in order to rejoin the Ascenso MX for the Apertura 2012 tournament. They also played the Austin Posse in 2004.

In June 2017, owner José Luis Higuera confirmed the club would no longer exist after he bought a new club, Club Atlético Zacatepec. The Coras franchise disappeared for a month after being relocated to Zacatepec, Morelos.

In July 2017, the Cuervos de Ensenada club management announced its relocation to Tepic, where it was renamed as Deportivo Tepic JAP. However, this new team was highlighted by poor economic and administrative management that led to its disappearance in May 2018.

Before the start of the 2018-19 season, it was announced the founding of a new team called Coras de Nayarit F.C., the new club arose from the purchase of the Acatlán franchise license and its relocation to Tepic, team that was champion of the Tercera División de México in the 2017-18 season, which could not promote by not meeting the requirements of Serie A. Coras de Nayarit was a team made up of local businessmen and the state government. In June 2020, this team was put on hiatus due to financial problems derived from COVID-19, so it did not participate in the 2020-21 season.

In July 2021, the team was resumed to continue participating in Serie A, however, due to changes in the administration the club was renamed as Coras F.C. In addition, the club created a reserve team to play in the Tercera División de México.

On June 28, 2023, the Liga Premier team was relocated to Piedras Negras, Coahuila, however they provisionally kept the original name. While the Liga TDP reserved team remained in Tepic for a little while, the directive argued the lack of conditions to play in Tepic due to the poor condition of the Estadio Nicolás Álvarez Ortega and the problems to use the Estadio Olímpico Santa Teresita.

On July 5, 2024, Coras FC was put on hiatus by its board due to economic and financial problems and a lack of interest and sponsors to help cover the team's operating expenses in the Liga Premier. The team was not reactivated for the 2025–26 season and was officially dissolved in accordance with the regulations.

== Stadium ==
On June 28, 2023, Coras F.C. began playing its home games at the Estadio Sección 123, located in Piedras Negras, Coahuila, after leaving its former home place in Tepic, Nayarit. The venue has a capacity to accommodate 6,000 people.

Between 2021 and 2023, Coras Fútbol Club played their home matches at the Estadio Olímpico Santa Teresita in Tepic, Nayarit. The stadium capacity is 4,000 people. It is owned by the state of Nayarit, and its surface is covered by natural grass. The stadium was opened in 2014.

Alternatively, the team also played some matches in the Estadio Nicolás Álvarez Ortega in Tepic, Nayarit. The stadium capacity is 12,271 people. It is also owned by Nayarit, and its surface is covered by natural grass. The stadium was opened in 2011. It was the club's main stadium until 2020, however, in 2021 it was decided to stop using this field because it is far from the urban area of Tepic.

== Managers ==
- (Mexico) Ramón Morales (2016)
- (Mexico) Marcelo Michel Leaño (2017)
- (Mexico) Manuel Naya Barba (2018–2020)
- (Mexico) Marco Antonio Díaz (2020–2021)
- (Mexico) Omar Ávila (2021–2022)
- (Mexico) Manuel Naya Barba (2022)
- (Mexico) José Rizo (2023–2024)

== Season to season ==
Season	Division	Notes
1959–60	Segunda División de México	
1960–61	Segunda División de México	
1961–62	Segunda División de México	
1964–65	Segunda División de México	
1965–66	Segunda División de México	
1966–67	Segunda División de México	
1967–68	Segunda División de México	
1968–69	Segunda División de México	
1969–70	Segunda División de México	
1970–71	Segunda División de México	
1971–72	Segunda División de México	
1971–72	Segunda División de México	
1973–74	Segunda División de México	
1974–75	Segunda División de México	
1975–76	Segunda División de México	
1976–77	Segunda División de México	
1977–78	Segunda División de México	
1978–79	Segunda División de México	
1979–80	Segunda División de México	

Season	Division	Place
1980–81	Segunda División de México	
1981–82	Segunda División de México	
1982–83	Segunda División de México	
1983–84	Segunda División de México	
1984–85	Segunda División de México	
1985–86	Segunda División de México	
1986–87	Segunda División de México	
1987–88	Segunda División de México	
1988–89	Segunda División de México	
1989–90	Segunda División de México	
1991–92	Segunda División de México	
1992–93	Segunda División de México	
1993–94	Segunda División de México	
1994–95	Primera División 'A' de México	
1995–96	Primera División 'A' de México	
Invierno 96	Segunda División de México	
Verano 97	Segunda División de México	
Invierno 97	Segunda División de México	
Verano 98	Segunda División de México	

Season	Division	Place
Invierno 98	Segunda División de México	
Verano 99	Segunda División de México	
Invierno 99	Segunda División de México	
Verano 00	Segunda División de México	
Invierno 00	Segunda División de México	
Verano 01	Segunda División de México	
Invierno 01	Segunda División de México	
Verano 02	Segunda División de México	
Invierno 02	Segunda División de México	
Verano 03	Segunda División de México	
Clausura 03	Segunda División de México	
Apertura 04	Segunda División de México	
Clausura 04	Segunda División de México	
Apertura 05	Segunda División de México	
Clausura 2005	Segunda División de México	
Apertura 2006	Tercera División de México	
Clausura 2006	Tercera División de México	
Apertura 2007	Tercera División de México	
Clausura 2007	Tercera División de México	

Season	Division	Place
Apertura 2008	Tercera División de México	
Clausura 2008	Tercera División de México	
Apertura 2009	Tercera División de México	
Clausura 2009	Tercera División de México	
Apertura 2011	Segunda División de México	
Clausura 2012	Segunda División de México	
Apertura 2012	Segunda División de México	
Clausura 2013	Segunda División de México	
Apertura 2013	Segunda División de México	5th (Quarterfinal)
Clausura 2014	Segunda División de México	2nd (Quarterfinal)
Apertura 2014	Liga de Ascenso de México	1st ("Runner-Up")
Clausura 2015	Liga de Ascenso de México	
Apertura 2015	Liga de Ascenso de México	
Clausura 2016	Liga de Ascenso de México	
Apertura 2016	Liga de Ascenso de México	
Clausura 2017	Liga de Ascenso de México	
Apertura 2017	Segunda División de México	
Clausura 2018	Segunda División de México	
2018–19	Segunda División de México	

- Has played in 60 Segunda División tournaments last in April 2018.
- Has played in 8 Tercera División tournaments last in 2009.
- Has played in 8 Ascenso MX tournaments last in the Clausura 2017.
- Has played in 0 Primera División tournaments in history.
- After the 1971–72 tournament, the club played under the name Club Universidad de Nayarit until the 1975–76 tournament.
- After the Clausura 2006, the club was sold to Guadalajara and was renamed Chivas Coras, but another club named Deportivo Tepic played in the Tercera División de México.
- The club left the Tercera División in 2009 and made a return in the Apertura 2011 in the Segunda División.

== Honours ==
=== National ===
==== Promotion divisions ====
- Ascenso MX
  - Runners-up (1): Apertura 2014
- Segunda División
  - Champions (1): Apertura 2002
  - Runners-up (2): 1982–83, Apertura 2012
- Copa México de la Segunda División
  - Runners-up (2): 1961–62, 1963–64
- Campeón de Campeones de la Segunda División
  - Runners-up (1): 2003

== Reserves ==
=== Deportivo Tepic "B" ===
The team participated in the Tercera División, finishing as champions in the Apertura 2002 tournament and also finishing as runners-up in the Clausura 2003 tournament.

== See also ==
- Segunda División de México
- Tercera División de México
- Primera División 'A' de México
- Liga de Ascenso de México
- Nayarit
- Football in Mexico
