= C.D. Poza Rica =

Mexican football club

Petroleros de Poza Rica
- Full name: Club de Fútbol Petroleros de Poza Rica
- Nickname: Los Petroleros
- Founded: 1950; 76 years ago
- Ground: Estadio Heriberto Jara Corona; Poza Rica, Veracruz
- Capacity: 10,000
- Owner: Sergio Quiroz Cruz
- Chairman: Sergio Quiroz Cruz
- Manager: Alberto Segura
- League: Liga Premier – Serie B
- 2025–26: Regular phase: 2nd Final phase: Semi–finals
Home colours	Away colours

Club de Fútbol Petroleros de Poza Rica is a Mexican professional football club based in Poza Rica, Veracruz that plays in the Liga Premier - Serie B, the third division level of Mexican football. They play their home team matches at the Estadio Heriberto Jara Corona.

== History ==
The club began in the 1950s in the Segunda División de México, in which they were very close to gaining promotion to the Primera División de México on three occasions.

In the 1962-63 season, the team was close to gaining promotion in the last week of the tournament. They would have gained promotion by becoming champions against Orizaba, but the ended up losing the match. This loss combined with the victory of Cruz Azul against Real Zamora caused the team to have to play in the promotional tournament against Nacional, Petroleros de Ciudad Madero, and Tiburones Rojos de Veracruz. This promotional tournament was decided by the league in order to increase the number of teams in the Primera División. The tournament was played from January 16, 1964 through February 16, 1964. Poza Rica found themselves in last place with only one win against Ciudad Madero on January 21 by the score of 6-1.

In the following season, 1963–64, the promotion was obtained by Petroleros de Ciudad Madero who were the leaders of the standings and thus making them champions.

The team never came close again to making it to the Primera División and was eventually relegated to the Tercera División de México. In the Tercera División, they were champion in the 1981-82 season after defeating Celaya. As a result, they were promoted back to the Segunda División in which they played from the 1982-83 season through the 1985-86 season, since the team was sold.

The team currently plays in the Liga Premier - Serie B playing their home team matches at the Estadio Heriberto Jara Corona. Their biggest rivals are Conejos de Tuxpan.

=== Promotional tournament ===
In order to increase the number of team from 14 to 16 for the 1964-65 the league made a playoff, the top 2 teams would gain promotion to the Primera División de México. The playoff was composed of the lowest team from the Primera División and the 2nd-5th teams in the standings from the Segunda División, as Cruz Azul had earned automatic promotion.

Position	Team	P	W	D	L	GF	GA	DIF	PTS
1	Nacional	3	1	2	0	4	3	1	4	Remains in Primera División
2	Tiburones Rojos de Veracruz	3	1	1	1	4	4	0	3	Earns promotion
3	Petroleros de Ciudad Madero	3	1	1	1	3	7	-4	3
4	Poza Rica	3	1	0	2	9	6	3	2

=== Return to Liga Premier ===
On May 14, 2023, Poza Rica earned promotion back to the Segunda División de México after a 37 year absence by defeating Ayense in front of 7,000 fans at home despite having to wait a day due to severe thunderstorms. They also had the obligation to defeat Sultanes de Tamazunchale, Puerto Vallarta F.C. and Búhos UNISON in order to gain promotion.

== Players ==
=== First-team squad ===
As of 15 January 2026

Note: Flags indicate national team as defined under FIFA eligibility rules; some limited exceptions apply. Players may hold more than one non-FIFA nationality.

No.	Pos.	Nation	Player
1	GK	MEX	Adrián Irigoyen
2	MF	MEX	Sergio Bustos
3	FW	MEX	Éder Mendoza
4	FW	MEX	Kevin Morales
5	FW	MEX	Luis Tapia
6	MF	MEX	Antonio Zamora
7	MF	MEX	Alexis Garcés
8	MF	MEX	César García
9	FW	MEX	Irving Sánchez
10	MF	MEX	Diego Trejo
11	DF	MEX	Hailton Hernández
12	DF	MEX	Carlos Ambrocio
13	FW	MEX	Érick Hernández
14	DF	MEX	Luis Ramírez
15	DF	MEX	Karim Rodríguez

No.	Pos.	Nation	Player
16	DF	MEX	Érick González
17	DF	MEX	César Castelán
18	DF	MEX	Max Juárez
19	MF	MEX	Daniel Arellanes
20	MF	MEX	Gael González
21	DF	MEX	Ian Juárez
22	DF	MEX	Gustavo Díaz
23	DF	MEX	Jared Vázquez
24	FW	MEX	Víctor Torres
25	MF	MEX	Santiago Gutiérrez
26	MF	MEX	Iarley Vargas
27	DF	MEX	David Domínguez
28	GK	MEX	Isaac Vázquez
29	FW	MEX	Armando Maya
31	GK	MEX	Gabriel del Ángel

== Honours ==
- Campeón de Campeones de la Segunda División de México (1): 1961
- Subcampeón de la Segunda División en 1962-63, 1963–64
- Copa de la Segunda División de México (4): 1959, 1961, 1963, 1967
