= San Isidro Laguna =

Mexican football club

Laguna
- Full name: Club de Fútbol Laguna A.C.
- Nickname: La Ola Verde
- Founded: 1953; 2013
- Dissolved: 1978; 2015
- Ground: Estadio San Isidro, Torreón, Coahuila, Mexico
- Capacity: 12,500
- League: Primera División de México
Home colours	Away colours

Club de Fútbol Laguna A.C. (nicknamed La Ola Verde) was a Mexican football club. The club played in the Mexican football league system Primera División de México and it was based in Torreón, Coahuila.

== History ==
Club de Fútbol Laguna A.C. was founded in 1953. In that same year, the club joined the Segunda División de México where they played from 1953 to 1967. It was in 1968 when the club was promoted to the Primera División de México with Juan Ángel "Pito" Pérez coaching the club, who took the place of the regulated Atlético Morelia franchise. The club was merely a contender in the Primera División but gave the people of the region a chance to see the Primera División action.

Club de Fútbol Laguna A.C. was sold in 1978 and the club was moved to Ciudad Nezahualcóyotl, State of Mexico and became Club Deportivo Coyotes Neza. In 1988, the club was once again sold and moved to Ciudad Victoria, Tamaulipas where it became Correcaminos UAT.

The club was revived in 2013 as San Isidro Laguna and competed in the Tercera División de México. However, it was dissolved again in 2015 due to financial problems.

== Statistics ==
Statistics while in 1st Division:

GP	W	D	L	GF	GA	PTS	DIF
381	102	120	159	435	531	324	−96

Statistics while Copa Mexico:

GP	W	D	L	GF	GA	Pts	DIF
40	15	8	17	48	66	38	−18

- GP – Games Played
- W – Won
- D – Draw
- L – Losses
- GF – Goals in Favor
- GA – Goals Against
- Pts – Points
- DIF -Difference in Goals

== Club Honors ==
- Segunda División Profesional (1): 1967–1968
- Runner Up Segunda División Profesional (1): 1966–1967
- Copa Mexico from the Segunda División Profesional (1): 1954–1955
- Runner Up Copa Mexico from the Segunda División Profesional (2): 1955–1956, 1959–1960

== See also ==
- Club de Fútbol Torreón, the predecessor club in the region
- Santos Laguna, the modern Liga MX club in the region
- Football in Mexico
