= C.F. Jabatos de Nuevo León =

Mexican football club

Jabatos de Nuevo León
- Full name: Club de Fútbol Nuevo León
- Nicknames: Jabatos, La Piara Salvaje
- Founded: 1957; 69 years ago
- Dissolved: 1991; 35 years ago
- Ground: Clemente Salinas Netro; Cadereyta, Nuevo León
- Capacity: 1,000
- Chairman: Hermanos Rivero
- Manager: Tomás Vitela
- League: Tercera División de México – Group XII
- 2020–21: 5th – Group XII
Home colours	Away colours

Jabatos de Nuevo León (or Club de Fútbol Nuevo León) was a Mexican football club founded in 1957 and based in Cadereyta, Nuevo León which started in the Primera División 'A' de México, the second division level of Mexican football. The club also played in the top division level Primera División de México, and various other lower divisions, such as the Segunda División and the bottom division level Tercera División de México, until about 1990, when lagging fan attendance competition was presented by two other professional clubs in Nuevo León, such as Monterrey and Tigres de la UANL.

== History ==
The club was founded in 1957 in Cadereyta, Nuevo León by local business owners Lauro Leal, César M. Saldaña, Manolo Pando and Ramón Pedroza Langarica, they had previously bought the Segunda División team Deportivo Anáhuac. They made their second division debut and inaugural win against La Piedad on July 13, 1958. Carlos Guerrero scored the only goal, giving the club its first win. Their inaugural at home win was on July 20, 1958, against Querétaro, 4–3. In the 1959–60 tournament, the club was sold to Tigres UANL due to economic and financial problems.

At the end of 1962, club was acquired by Sergio Salinas, who brought back the club's name and colors. The club made its return to the Segunda División in the Estadio Tecnológico against Pachuca, winning 4–2. After tying in first place in the league with Tampico Madero, they won a tie-breaking match in the Estadio de Martinica, earning the Jabatos a place in the Primera División de México. Directed by Paulino Sánchez and Alberto Etcheverry, the Jabatos made their presentation in the first division in the 1966–67 season and would end the season in sixth place in general. On July 24, 1967, they gained the inaugural victory in the recently opened Estadio Universitario in a friendly match against the Mexico national football team. The stadium was opened on May 30, 1967 with a tie between Monterrey and Atlético Madrid, later Jabatos tied 1–1 with Sheffield United.

The club's prowess fell, losing 10–2 on January 14, 1968, to Guadalajara. The club remained in the first division until the 1968–69 season, descending after playing a three-game relegation tournament in the Estadio Azteca, 1–1, 2–2, and 1–0 in favor of the Club Oro. In order to ascend again, the team maintained nearly the same lineup in the 1969–70 season of the Segunda División de México. This did not play out as planned, and the team ended up in last place of the Segunda División and relegated to the Tercera División de México. At the time, northern Mexico had yet to allow a team from the Tercera División due to financial prohibition. Disappearing for the 1971–72 season, the Jabatos returned in the 1973–74 season and began the Tercera División in the north. They played in the Tercera División until the season 1978–79, when they disappeared for a third time.

The Rivero brothers revived the club for the 1987–88 season in the Liga Premier - Serie B. The Jabatos carried the league in its first season, obtained the title and ascending to the next league. In the 1988–89 season, the team played at the Serie A national league but lost to Venados F.C., and did not promote. Lacking sponsor support in Monterrey, Nuevo León, the Rivero brothers sold the franchise to Grupo Botanas Leo. It was relocated to Saltillo, Coahuila and the Jabatos name was retired when they were renamed "Leones de Saltillo", making the Jabatos team come to its end.

== Primera División de México statistics ==
GP	W	D	L	G F	GS	Pts	DIF
93	26	25	42	113	139	77	−26

- GP – Games Played
- W – Wins
- D – Draws
- L – Loss
- GF – Goals in favor
- GC – Goals Against
- Pts – Points
- DIF – Difference

== Distinctions ==
- Segunda División de México (1): 1965–1966
- Segunda "B" (1): 1987–1988
