= Club Deportivo Nacional =

Mexican association football club

Nacional
- Full name: Club Deportivo Nacional, A. C.
- Nickname: Pericos (parrots)
- Founded: 1916; 110 years ago
- Ground: Club Deportivo Imperio; Zapopan, Jalisco
- Capacity: 500
- Chairman: José Alberto Cortés García
- Manager: Luis Octavio Torres
- League: Liga TDP – Group XII
- 2020–21: 20th – Group X
Home colours	Away colours

Club Deportivo Nacional is a Mexican football team founded in Guadalajara, Jalisco in 1916. The club won its first title in 1922, playing in the Segunda División de México. It also won seven Liga Amateurs de Jalisco between the 1925–1926 and 1938–1939 seasons, which is the second most years won by a team, behind Guadalajara, who have won 13. The club has played in the most important leagues in the country and currently plays in the Tercera División de México.

== History ==
=== Amateur era ===
The club's origins date back to 1915 in the barrio (neighborhood) of Mexicaltzingo in the city of Guadalajara, Jalisco when Club Único split into two clubs. It joined the second division of the Liga de Jalisco in 1919 where they played until 1922 when they won and were allowed to join the league's first division. However, the league made it difficult for the club to join and made them play an exhibition match to prove they were worthiness to play in the first division. Once allowed in, the club went on to win seven titles in 1925–1926, 1926–1927, 1930–1931, 1931–1932, 1933–1934, 1936–1937 and 1938–1939, which puts them behind only Guadalajara, who won 13.

=== 1924–25 title match ===
In the 1923–24 tournament the club finished second in the league thanks to Alfonso Ávila, Lorenzo Camarena, Rafael Fierro, Juan Valencia, Manuel Benavides, Simón García, Juan Vázquez, Teófilo Zúñiga, Luis Valencia, Miguel Alatorre, and Daniel Gómez, along with Isabel Huerta, Francisco Espinosa, Francisco Fierro and Hilario López.

After the tournament ended, the club made its first appearance in Mexico City where they played a friendly series with Real Club España, which they lost. Later, Club Deportivo Nacional went on to play another friendly cup series against local club Club Alianza, this time winning and taking home the Copa Latino-Nacional.

In the 1924–25 tournament, the club finished tied with Guadalajara, so a championship match was organized which took place on April 5, 1925. The Estadio Felipe Martínez Sandoval was filled to capacity, causing a disturbance due to the number of supporters both inside and outside the stadium. It led to the soldiers shooting warning shots into the sky to try to keep order.

The first goal was scored by Anastasio Prieto from C.D. Guadalajara. In the second half, Zuavo from Nacional scored the equalizer. Close to the end of the game, a penalty was called in favor of C.D. Guadalajara, which Nacional protested and some players, in their rage, decided to leave the field. The referee decided that the game must continue regardless. Back-up goalkeeper Francisco Fierros did not leave and so the penalty was executed by Anastasio Prieto, who had scored the first goal for C.D. Guadalajara. This time he was not as fortunate, and his penalty was blocked. The players who had exited decided to return to the game, and a few minutes later the referee called full-time. The draw would have given El Nacional the title, which players from C.D. Guadalajara protested, claiming that the goalkeeper who had blocked the penalty was not a legal player as no substitution had been made. The referee decided to take this to the league's federation, who decided that the game should be played again. So the game was replayed on April 20 that same year. The first half finished with no goals scored. In the second half, a penalty was called for El Nacional. The penalty was missed after the ball hit the goal post and so the game remained 0–0. At the end of the game, a long pass was made from the C.D. Guadalajara goalkeeper to Higinio "El Perico" Huerta who, in one swift move, headed the ball and scored the only goal giving C.D. Guadalajara the title. With this, the league's first rivalry was born.

The line-ups for the clubs were as follows:

- C.D. Guadalajara: F. Prieto, D. Huerta, Arias, J. Aceves, G. Prieto, Pellat, Aceves, A. Prieto, Carranza, González, H. Huerta.
- El Nacional: A. Ávila, L. Camarena, R. Fierros, Benavides, López, García, Zúñiga, Valencia, Alatorre, D. Gómez, J. Vázquez.

=== 1925–26 first title ===
In the 1925–26 tournament, after having lost the match against Guadalajara the year prior, the club reinforced its squad by signing new players: Aurelio "Mortero" Delgado, Lorenzo González, José María Chávez and Antonio Casillas. The club managed to win its first title after beating Atlas in May 1926 with a score of 3–2. For that match, the Nacional supporters once again filled the stadium to capacity, but there were not as many incidents as the year before. The club finished with 17 points, two more than the runner-up C.D. Guadalajara; Atlas finished with 13. Club Deportivo Nacional did not lose any games during the tournament.

== 1930s championships ==
=== Copa Aviación ===
In 1928, with the inauguration of Campo de Aviación a series was organized with Selección Jalisco, who represented the league from Jalisco, against Guerra y Marina from Mexico City. There were players from El Nacional in both clubs. Hilario López was playing for Guerra y Marina. The trophy was donated by then-Mexican president Lázaro Cárdenas. Selección Jalisco won and took that trophy, which later was giving to El Nacional in 1930–31 after the club won the first division league title as well as the third division inferior league.

=== League titles ===
After star player Lorenzo Camarena followed in the footsteps of Hilario López and left the club to join Mexico City's Guerra y Marina, the club brought in new players José "Carbonero" Sánchez, José Sánchez Mut, Teódoro alba, Lorenzo González, "El Salero", Manuel Vázquez que junto con Luis Valencia, Juan Vázquez, Aurelio Delgado, R. Sánchez, Delfino Ríos, "El Sihuín" y "El Talache". The last two came from Atlético Latino. El Nacional went on to win the 1930–1931 and 1931–1932 league titles.

In the 1933–34 season, the club managed to win the league's title for the fifth time, this time under the management of Luis Valencia, Juan Vázquez and Ramón Sánchez. The roster included Francisco y Enrique Múñoz, Antonio Rodríguez, Juan Salcido, J. Jesús Ruelas, Hermilo Zamora, Manuel García, José Luna, José Guzmán, Jesús López "Moco III", Juan López "Moco II", Rosalío Morales, J. Trinidad González, Santos Sandoval with Luis Valencia as team captain.

At the end of the tournament, the club had its first international match against Chilean team Audax Italiano, who was on an off-season tour through Mexico playing with top clubs in the country's capital. Audax Italiano also played matches against Club Latino and Guadalajara. The match took place in April 1933 with a cup donated by Alfonso Rosales and José María Martínez, the owners of Club Nacional. The match finished with a 2–2 draw. In a friendly gesture, they decided to split the cup in two, an agreement that Audax Italiano did not initially agree with.

The club ended the 1930s by winning their sixth and seventh league titles in 1937–1938 and 1939–1940, and finished second in the 1935–1936 tournament. This gave them five league titles and various friendly cups in the 1930s.

== 1940s ==
The club started the decade by finishing as the runners-up in 1940–1941. With President Manuel P. Carrillo, the club was invited to play in the Liga Amateur Del Distrito Federal, Mexico City's top football league at the time. The league decided to get the best players from the local league and let them play for Selección Jalisco, which would represent all clubs from Jalisco in Mexico City until 1942–1943, when the country organized their first professional league. With the professionalization of football in Mexico, the Jalisco league lost important clubs.

In 1945, Alfonso Rosales, José T. Meza and Mateo Zepeda took over the then-dismantled club that had many of their top players leaving to join clubs that offered them more money. Club Deportivo Nacional was purchased along with a group of reduced collaborators, José Ramírez being the most important.

From 1946 to 1951, Daniel Jaime and his sons took ownership and tried hard to promote it and place it in the best leagues in Mexico. The club kept producing good players, such as Jesús "Chuco" Ponce and Tomás Balcázar, standouts who later went on to be part of the Campeonísimo with Guadalajara in the 1960s.

== 1950s ==
From 1951 to 1954, Antonio Casilla was the club's owner and saw it struggle during his ownership. In 1954, he sold the club to J. Guadalupe Vargas, who went on to register the club in the Segunda División de México, finally putting them in the professional leagues in Mexico. The club made it official on February 26, 1956 and played in their first tournament later in the year.

The club's first game was played on July 18, 1956, against Celaya, who defeated them 2–1. El Nacional did not win a single match until the third round when the beat Club de Fútbol Laguna 4–3. It played in the Segunda División from 1956 to 1961 when the club won the championship and was awarded a promotion to the Primera División de México.

== 1960s Primera División de México ==
The club played its first Primera División de México tournament in the 1960–61 season. It finished with seven wins, nine draws, ten losses, and thirty scored goals and from an allowed 44. This gave them 23 points. The team was tied for eighth with Tampico Tampico and Atlante That same year Club Universidad Nacional was promoted and Zacatepec was relegated to the Segunda División.

In the 1962–63 tournament, the club finished sixth overall with nine wins, nine draws, eight losses, scoring 37 goals from an allowed 43. This put them nine points shy of their crosstown rival Oro, who finished with 37 points. That same year, Zacatepec was promoted after a year in the inferior division and Tampico Maderowas relegated to the Segunda División.

In the 1963–64 tournament, the club finished last in the league with four wins, four draws, 18 losses, totaling 12 points. They scored 26 goals from allowed 71. The club had the worst goal differential in the league after allowing 45 more goals than they scored. Cruz Azul (Segunda División champion) and Veracruz (2nd place in a promotion tournament) were promoted, which increased the number of teams to 16, in which Nacional was first, and thus not relegated.

In the 1964–65 tournament, the club finished 14th, last in the league with a record of six wins, ten draws, 14 losses, and scored 29 goals from an allowed 50, for a total of 22 points. El Nacional started the tournament by losing against América 2–1 then losing 3–0 to León in the third round. They lost 2–1 to Atlético Morelia, in the fourth, lost 2–0 to Monterrey, in the 5th round and lost again to Toluca 2–0. In the sixth round, the club was humiliated after losing 6–1 to Oro and, as if that was not enough, in round 7 the club lost 5–1 to Club Universidad Nacional. In the round 8 the club finally earned their first point after drawing 0–0 with Necaxa. The club was relegated to the Segunda División that year, the club's last season in the Primera División to date.

=== Primera División de México statistics ===
GP	W	D	L	GF	GA	Pts	DIF
108	26	32	50	122	198	84	−74

- Gp – Games Played
- W – Wins
- D – Draws
- L – Loss
- GF – Goals For
- GA – Goals Allowed
- Pts – Points
- DIF – Difference

== After of the Primera División relegation ==
After its relegation from the Primera División in 1965, the team had an opportunity to return to the top category in 1970, that year a special tournament was played for the celebration of the FIFA World Cup in Mexico and the subsequent expansion of the first division to 18 clubs. Nacional qualified for the final phase of the tournament along with Puebla, Naucalpan and Unión de Curtidores, however, the Guadalajara team finished the stage in third place, so they were left without the promotion, which was won by Puebla.

After the failed attempt to promote in 1970, the team entered into financial problems, so it began to change fields, leaving the Estadio Jalisco to move to the Estadio Tecnológico de la U. de G., later, in 1976 the club was moved to Ciudad Guzmán, to about 120 kilometers from Guadalajara, since the local city council offered support for the team. However, the team failed to gain enough fans and support, so in 1979 it was dissolved after selling its license to Satélites de Tulancingo being relocated to Tulancingo, Hidalgo.

After the dissolution of the original team in 1979, the club has reappeared on several occasions in the Tercera División de México, in 2017 the team was reestablished with the help of the PALMAC organization, so the team was called Nacional PALMAC, finally in 2019 the club recovered its original name with which it has competed since that year.

== Present day ==
The club has participated on and off the pitch in the Segunda and Tercera División de México. Its squad is mostly made up of young players trying to bring the club back to its former glory. It also has a female football club that plays in the city of Guadalajara, Jalisco.

== Honors ==
=== Amateur ===
- Liga Occidental De Jalisco (7) 1925–1926, 1926–1927, 1930–1931, 1931–1932, 1933–1934, 1936–1937, 1938–1939

=== Professional era ===
- Segunda División de México: 1960–1961
- Copa México de Segunda División de México 1958
- Campeón de Campeones de Segunda División de México 1958

=== Other titles ===
- Liga Interzona No. 16: 1958–1959, 1961–1962
- Copa Leguer Lizaldi: 1961, 1962

== See also ==
- C. D. Guadalajara
