= 1993–94 Mexican Segunda División season =

Segunda División de México
- Season: 1993–94
- Champions: Tampico Madero (1st Title)
- Promoted: Oaxaca; Tecomán; UAQ; Colimense
- Matches played: 394
- Goals scored: 1,020 (2.59 per match)
- Top goalscorer: Eugenio Constantino; Valentín Gómez (19 goals)

The 1993–94 Segunda División was the 45th season of the Mexican Segunda División. The season started on 16 July 1993 and concluded on 16 April 1994. It was won by Tampico Madero.

After completing this cycle, the Primera División 'A' was created with the aim of increasing interest in the lower divisions of Mexican football. As a result, the 1993–94 season represented the last season in which the Segunda División was the second hierarchical level of Mexican football, as of 1994–95 it became the third category in the Mexican league system.

== Changes ==
- UT Neza was promoted to Primera División.
- Pachuca was relegated from Primera División.
- Oaxaca, Tecomán and UAQ were promoted from Segunda División B.
- Colimense was promoted from Tercera División.
- Pioneros Cancún, Delfines Acapulco, Bachilleres and La Piedad were relegated from Segunda División.
- SUOO was bought by new owners, the team was relocated at Villahermosa and renamed as Tabasco.
- Linces Celaya sold its license to San Luis.

== Teams ==
1993–94 season Teams

Club	City	Stadium
Atlético Cuernavaca	Cuernavaca	Estadio Centenario
Atlético San Francisco	San Francisco del Rincón	Estadio San Francisco
Ayense	Ayotlán	Estadio Chino Rivas
Celaya	Celaya	Estadio Miguel Alemán Valdés
Cobras	Ciudad Juárez	Estadio Olímpico Benito Juárez
Colimense	Colima City	Estadio Colima
Inter de Tijuana	Tijuana	Estadio Cerro Colorado
Irapuato	Irapuato	Estadio Sergio León Chávez
Marte	Xochitepec	Estadio Mariano Matamoros
Oaxaca	Oaxaca City	Estadio Benito Juárez
Pachuca	Pachuca	Estadio Hidalgo
San Luis	San Luis Potosí City	Estadio Plan de San Luis
Tabasco	Villahermosa	Estadio Olímpico de Villahermosa
Tampico Madero	Tampico and Ciudad Madero	Estadio Tamaulipas
Tecomán	Tecomán	Estadio IAETAC
Tepatitlán	Tepatitlán	Estadio Gregorio "Tepa" Gómez
Tepic	Tepic	Estadio Nicolás Álvarez Ortega
UAQ	Querétaro City	Estadio Corregidora
Yucatán	Mérida	Estadio Carlos Iturralde
Zacatepec	Zacatepec	Estadio Agustín "Coruco" Díaz

== Group stage ==
=== Group 1 ===
Pos	Team	Pld	W	D	L	GF	GA	GD	Pts	Qualification or relegation
1	Atlético San Francisco (Q)	38	17	12	9	51	36	+15	56	Qualified to Playoffs
2	Pachuca (Q)	38	14	15	9	61	48	+13	56	Qualified to Playoffs
3	Marte	38	17	9	12	46	40	+6	55	
4	Oaxaca	38	9	16	13	43	61	−18	39	
5	Tepic	38	7	10	21	43	72	−29	29	

Source: RSSSF
(Q) Qualified for the phase indicated

=== Group 2 ===
Pos	Team	Pld	W	D	L	GF	GA	GD	Pts	Qualification or relegation
1	Tampico Madero (Q)	38	22	10	6	78	43	+35	71	Qualified to Playoffs
2	San Luis (Q)	38	11	12	15	50	48	+2	42	Qualified to Playoffs
3	Tecomán	38	10	13	15	47	55	−8	41	
4	Celaya	38	9	12	17	43	62	−19	37	
5	Ayense	38	10	8	20	33	64	−31	32	

Source: RSSSF
(Q) Qualified for the phase indicated

=== Group 3 ===
Pos	Team	Pld	W	D	L	GF	GA	GD	Pts	Qualification or relegation
1	Zacatepec (Q)	38	14	14	10	55	38	+17	54	Qualified to Playoffs
2	Tepatitlán (Q)	38	15	11	12	50	49	+1	51	Qualified to Playoffs
3	UAQ	38	11	16	11	50	51	−1	47	
4	Inter de Tijuana	38	10	18	10	44	46	−2	44	
5	Atlético Cuernavaca	38	12	10	16	33	44	−11	44	

Source: RSSSF
(Q) Qualified for the phase indicated

=== Group 4 ===
Pos	Team	Pld	W	D	L	GF	GA	GD	Pts	Qualification or relegation
1	Yucatán (Q)	38	21	9	8	59	25	+34	68	Qualified to Playoffs
2	Irapuato (Q)	38	15	13	10	56	32	+24	56	Qualified to Playoffs
3	Cobras	38	17	9	12	58	44	+14	53	
4	Tabasco	38	11	13	14	38	48	−10	43	
5	Colimense	38	8	10	20	45	77	−32	29	

Source: RSSSF
(Q) Qualified for the phase indicated

== Results ==
Home \ Away	ATC	ASF	AYE	CEL	COB	COL	INT	IRA	MAR	OAX	PAC	SNL	TAB	TAM	TEC	TEA	TEP	UAQ	YUC	ZAC
Atlético Cuernavaca	—	0–4	5–1	2–0	1–2	1–1	0–0	0–0	0–0	0–3	0–0	2–1	0–0	0–2	4–1	2–1	0–0	0–1	0–0	0–0
Atlético San Francisco	1–0	—	2–1	2–1	1–0	3–0	1–2	1–1	2–2	1–1	1–0	2–0	3–1	0–2	2–0	0–0	2–1	2–1	2–0	1–1
Ayense	0–1	1–1	—	1–3	1–0	1–0	1–0	0–0	0–1	4–1	2–1	0–0	3–4	3–1	1–1	2–0	1–0	1–2	1–0	1–1
Celaya	0–2	1–2	3–0	—	1–4	2–0	1–1	0–0	2–0	0–1	0–0	3–2	1–0	2–5	3–1	1–1	4–2	0–0	0–0	1–1
Cobras	2–0	2–1	3–1	3–1	—	4–0	0–1	0–1	0–0	1–1	1–1	1–0	2–0	0–1	2–1	2–0	3–2	1–0	2–1	1–0
Colimense	3–2	1–0	0–0	2–2	3–3	—	1–2	1–0	0–3	1–2	2–2	1–1	1–0	1–1	1–2	3–1	5–3	1–3	1–3	1–0
Inter Tijuana	1–3	1–1	1–0	2–2	2–1	2–2	—	3–0	2–2	1–1	2–0	0–1	2–2	0–1	4–0	1–1	2–1	1–1	1–0	0–1
Irapuato	5–1	2–0	2–0	1–0	0–1	2–0	0–0	—	2–1	4–0	4–1	2–0	4–0	7–1	2–2	2–0	3–0	1–1	1–1	3–1
Marte	0–1	2–0	4–0	0–0	1–0	2–2	1–1	2–1	—	3–0	1–3	1–0	2–0	1–1	1–0	0–2	2–1	3–1	0–2	1–1
Oaxaca	0–1	1–1	0–0	0–0	3–2	2–1	2–2	0–0	1–0	—	2–2	2–2	1–1	1–2	0–0	1–0	1–1	4–0	1–3	2–2
Pachuca	2–0	1–1	2–0	3–2	2–4	4–1	4–0	2–2	3–0	3–1	—	1–1	5–2	0–1	1–1	1–2	2–0	3–1	1–1	1–1
San Luis	2–0	1–3	3–1	0–1	3–3	3–1	0–0	0–0	1–2	2–0	0–0	—	1–0	1–1	1–0	1–2	4–0	1–1	3–0	2–1
Tabasco	1–2	0–1	2–0	3–1	0–0	1–0	0–0	1–1	3–1	3–2	0–0	0–3	—	1–1	1–1	3–0	2–1	2–0	0–0	1–1
Tampico Madero	2–0	0–2	4–1	4–0	2–1	7–0	2–1	1–0	4–0	5–0	2–2	4–3	0–2	—	2–0	3–1	2–1	2–2	1–1	5–1
Tecomán	2–1	1–1	0–1	6–2	2–2	2–0	0–0	2–1	0–3	3–1	1–1	3–1	5–0	0–2	—	0–1	4–2	1–1	0–0	1–1
Tepatitlán	2–0	3–2	5–0	2–0	2–0	3–2	1–1	2–0	1–0	2–1	1–2	3–2	2–0	1–1	1–1	—	1–1	1–1	1–1	0–0
Tepic	2–0	0–0	2–0	3–1	2–2	2–0	2–2	1–0	1–2	1–1	2–3	1–1	0–2	2–3	1–0	2–0	—	0–0	0–2	0–1
UAQ	0–0	2–1	2–0	1–1	4–2	2–2	4–2	1–1	0–1	1–2	3–1	2–2	0–0	3–0	1–2	3–3	2–2	—	1–0	2–0
Yucatán	2–0	2–0	5–1	2–0	1–1	1–2	3–0	2–0	2–0	4–1	0–1	2–1	1–0	1–0	3–1	3–1	6–0	2–0	—	1–0
Zacatepec	0–2	1–1	2–2	3–1	1–0	3–2	3–1	3–1	0–1	3–0	3–0	2–0	0–0	1–1	3–0	4–0	6–1	3–0	0–1	—

Source: RSSSF
Legend: Blue = home team win; Yellow = draw; Red = away team win.

== Championship play-offs ==
=== Play-offs ===
Quarter-finals
1	Tampico Madero	0	4	4
14	San Luis	1	0	1
4	Atlético San Francisco (p.)	0	1	1 (4)
5	Pachuca	0	1	1 (2)
2	Yucatán (p.)	0	1	1 (3)
9	Tepatitlán	0	1	1 (1)
3	Irapuato	0	1	1
7	Zacatepec	0	0	0

Semi-finals
1	Tampico Madero	3	4	7
4	Atlético San Francisco	2	0	2
2	Yucatán	3	1	4
3	Irapuato	6	1	7

Final
1	Tampico Madero	1	3	4
3	Irapuato	2	1	3

=== Final ===
April 10, 1994	Irapuato	2–1	Tampico Madero	Irapuato
	Rafael Vázquez 46', 80'	Report	Sergio Lira 18'	Stadium: Estadio Sergio León Chávez

April 16, 1994	Tampico Madero	3–1 (4–3 agg.)	Irapuato	Tampico and Ciudad Madero
	Sergio Lira 8'; Francisco Fernández 27'; René Mendieta 50'	Report	Rafael Vázquez 85'	Stadium: Estadio Tamaulipas

== Primera División 'A' creation ==
In 1994, with the aim to create a premier league, the Mexican Football Federation upgraded the Segunda División (Second Division) to "Primera División 'A'" (First Division A) to bring closer the level of play in the two tiers, Primera and Primera A. The project was under the direction of José Antonio García Rodríguez, then president of the top-tier Primera Division. He envisioned the new division to be joined by the teams of the Segunda División with the best sports level and the highest quality facilities to better integrate in an eventual promotion to the Primera Division.

12 Segunda División teams were promoted to Primera A. The placement of the clubs was done as follows:

Primera División 'A' (new second level)	Segunda División (new third level)	Other
Atlético Cuernavaca (sold to Atlético Celaya); Atlético San Francisco; Inter de Tijuana; Irapuato; Marte; Pachuca; San Luis; UAQ; Tabasco; Tepic; Yucatán; Zacatepec	Ayense; Celaya; Colimense; Oaxaca; Tecomán; Tepatitlán (relocated at Puerto Vallarta)	Tampico Madero (promoted to Primera División); Cobras (dissolved)
