= 1992–93 Mexican Segunda División season =

Segunda División de México
- Season: 1992–93
- Champions: UT Neza (1st Title)
- Promoted: Tepatitlán; Atlético San Francisco
- Relegated: Pioneros Cancún; Delfines Acapulco; Bachilleres; La Piedad
- Matches: 396
- Goals: 988 (2.49 per match)
- Top goalscorer: Francisco Javier Díaz (27 goals)

The 1992–93 Segunda División was the 44th season of the Mexican Segunda División. The season started on 7 August 1992 and concluded on 23 May 1993. It was won by UT Neza.

In this edition the best team of the regular season qualified directly for the final of the championship.

== Changes ==
- Pachuca was promoted to Primera División.
- Cobras was relegated from Primera División.
- Tepatitlán was promoted from Segunda División B.
- Atlético San Francisco was promoted from Tercera División.
- Zitlaltepec was promoted from Segunda División B, however, the team was relocated to Xochitepec and renamed Marte.
- Delfines de Abasolo was promoted from Segunda División B, however, the team did not meet the requirements to compete and its license was bought by Delfines de Acapulco, which remained in the division.
- Tecomán, UAQ and Chetumal were relegated from Segunda División.

== Teams ==
1992–93 season Teams

| Club | City | Stadium |
|---|---|---|
| Atlético Cuernavaca | Cuernavaca | Estadio Centenario |
| Atlético San Francisco | San Francisco del Rincón | Estadio San Francisco |
| Ayense | Ayotlán | Estadio Chino Rivas |
| Bachilleres | Guadalajara | Estadio Tecnológico UdeG |
| Celaya | Celaya | Estadio Miguel Alemán Valdés |
| Cobras | Ciudad Juárez | Estadio Olímpico Benito Juárez |
| Delfines Acapulco | Acapulco | Unidad Deportiva Acapulco |
| Inter de Tijuana | Tijuana | Estadio Cerro Colorado |
| Irapuato | Irapuato | Estadio Sergio León Chávez |
| La Piedad | La Piedad | Estadio Juan N. López |
| Linces Celaya | Celaya | Estadio Miguel Alemán Valdés |
| Marte | Xochitepec | Estadio Mariano Matamoros |
| Pioneros Cancún | Cancún | Estadio Cancún 86 |
| SUOO | Cuautitlán | Estadio Los Pinos |
| Tampico Madero | Tampico and Ciudad Madero | Estadio Tamaulipas |
| Tepatitlán | Tepatitlán | Estadio Gregorio "Tepa" Gómez |
| Tepic | Tepic | Estadio Nicolás Álvarez Ortega |
| UT Neza | Ciudad Nezahualcóyotl | Estadio Neza 86 |
| Yucatán | Mérida | Estadio Carlos Iturralde |
| Zacatepec | Zacatepec | Estadio Agustín "Coruco" Díaz |

== Group stage ==
=== Group 1 ===
| Pos | Team | Pld | W | D | L | GF | GA | GD | Pts | Qualification or relegation |
|---|---|---|---|---|---|---|---|---|---|---|
| 1 | Tampico Madero (Q) | 38 | 21 | 8 | 9 | 68 | 40 | +28 | 66 | Qualified to Playoffs |
| 2 | Cobras (Q) | 38 | 16 | 14 | 8 | 57 | 35 | +22 | 58 | Qualified to Playoffs |
| 3 | Tepatitlán | 38 | 11 | 14 | 13 | 41 | 50 | −9 | 43 | |
| 4 | Linces Celaya | 38 | 9 | 16 | 13 | 42 | 55 | −13 | 39 | |
| 5 | Bachilleres (R) | 38 | 5 | 16 | 17 | 35 | 61 | −26 | 29 | Relegated |

Source: RSSSF
(Q) Qualified for the phase indicated; (R) Relegated

=== Group 2 ===
| Pos | Team | Pld | W | D | L | GF | GA | GD | Pts | Qualification or relegation |
|---|---|---|---|---|---|---|---|---|---|---|
| 1 | Irapuato (Q) | 38 | 16 | 13 | 9 | 46 | 32 | +14 | 55 | Qualified to Playoffs |
| 2 | Celaya (Q) | 38 | 15 | 11 | 12 | 48 | 48 | 0 | 49 | Qualified to Playoffs |
| 3 | Ayense | 38 | 12 | 14 | 12 | 53 | 53 | 0 | 44 | |
| 4 | Pioneros Cancún (R) | 38 | 10 | 11 | 17 | 38 | 57 | −19 | 38 | Relegated |
| 5 | Delfines Acapulco (R) | 38 | 9 | 14 | 15 | 32 | 48 | −16 | 35 | Relegated |

Source: RSSSF
(Q) Qualified for the phase indicated; (R) Relegated

=== Group 3 ===
| Pos | Team | Pld | W | D | L | GF | GA | GD | Pts | Qualification or relegation |
|---|---|---|---|---|---|---|---|---|---|---|
| 1 | UT Neza (Q) | 38 | 20 | 11 | 7 | 68 | 38 | +30 | 68 | Qualified to Final |
| 2 | Zacatepec (Q) | 38 | 19 | 12 | 7 | 66 | 42 | +24 | 64 | Qualified to Playoffs |
| 3 | Marte | 38 | 10 | 20 | 8 | 44 | 41 | +3 | 46 | |
| 4 | SUOO | 38 | 13 | 10 | 15 | 43 | 48 | −5 | 42 | |
| 5 | La Piedad (R) | 38 | 5 | 15 | 18 | 24 | 47 | −23 | 27 | Relegated |

Source: RSSSF
(Q) Qualified for the phase indicated; (R) Relegated

=== Group 4 ===
| Pos | Team | Pld | W | D | L | GF | GA | GD | Pts | Qualification or relegation |
|---|---|---|---|---|---|---|---|---|---|---|
| 1 | Inter de Tijuana (Q) | 38 | 15 | 9 | 14 | 55 | 47 | +8 | 49 | Qualified to Playoffs |
| 2 | Atlético San Francisco (Q) | 38 | 12 | 14 | 12 | 49 | 43 | +6 | 48 | Qualified to Playoffs |
| 3 | Yucatán | 38 | 12 | 10 | 16 | 55 | 56 | −1 | 41 | |
| 4 | Atlético Cuernavaca | 38 | 9 | 17 | 12 | 48 | 56 | −8 | 39 | |
| 5 | Tepic | 38 | 11 | 11 | 16 | 39 | 54 | −15 | 39 | |

Source: RSSSF
(Q) Qualified for the phase indicated

== Results ==
| Home \ Away | ATC | ASF | AYE | BAC | CEL | COB | DEL | INT | IRA | LPD | LIN | MAR | PIO | SUO | TAM | TEA | TEP | UTN | YUC | ZAC |
|---|---|---|---|---|---|---|---|---|---|---|---|---|---|---|---|---|---|---|---|---|
| Atlético Cuernavaca | — | 1–1 | 1–1 | 1–1 | 5–1 | 2–2 | 1–0 | 0–0 | 1–1 | 1–0 | 2–2 | 0–0 | 0–1 | 1–0 | 3–3 | 1–2 | 1–0 | 1–1 | 3–2 | 0–3 |
| Atlético San Francisco | 2–3 | — | 0–0 | 3–0 | 1–0 | 2–0 | 4–0 | 2–1 | 1–1 | 3–1 | 1–1 | 1–1 | 2–0 | 1–1 | 3–0 | 4–1 | 2–2 | 1–1 | 3–0 | 1–2 |
| Ayense | 6–2 | 7–1 | — | 1–0 | 1–2 | 1–2 | 0–0 | 3–1 | 2–2 | 2–0 | 0–0 | 2–2 | 1–0 | 3–2 | 1–1 | 1–0 | 3–2 | 1–1 | 1–1 | 2–1 |
| Bachilleres | 3–1 | 1–1 | 2–1 | — | 1–1 | 1–0 | 1–1 | 3–1 | 2–0 | 2–2 | 1–1 | 0–0 | 2–4 | 1–1 | 0–1 | 2–2 | 2–2 | 0–1 | 1–1 | 1–1 |
| Celaya | 0–0 | 3–2 | 3–1 | 4–1 | — | 2–0 | 1–0 | 2–1 | 0–0 | 3–0 | 0–0 | 0–3 | 3–0 | 1–0 | 1–0 | 2–2 | 1–0 | 1–3 | 2–1 | 3–0 |
| Cobras | 2–0 | 2–0 | 1–1 | 3–0 | 5–1 | — | 1–0 | 4–0 | 2–0 | 2–1 | 2–2 | 3–2 | 2–0 | 2–0 | 0–0 | 5–0 | 0–1 | 1–0 | 3–0 | 1–1 |
| Delfines Acapulco | 2–1 | 2–0 | 2–1 | 0–0 | 2–2 | 0–0 | — | 2–1 | 0–0 | 0–0 | 2–0 | 0–2 | 0–0 | 1–0 | 2–0 | 3–2 | 0–2 | 0–1 | 1–0 | 1–1 |
| Inter Tijuana | 0–2 | 2–1 | 0–0 | 5–1 | 3–1 | 1–1 | 4–1 | — | 2–0 | 5–1 | 4–0 | 2–2 | 4–1 | 3–0 | 0–0 | 2–1 | 3–0 | 3–2 | 1–0 | 2–1 |
| Irapuato | 2–1 | 0–0 | 1–0 | 1–0 | 2–0 | 1–1 | 2–1 | 1–0 | — | 1–0 | 3–0 | 0–0 | 1–1 | 0–0 | 2–0 | 0–0 | 5–1 | 3–1 | 6–0 | 5–1 |
| La Piedad | 1–1 | 1–0 | 2–0 | 1–1 | 0–0 | 0–0 | 1–1 | 0–2 | 2–0 | — | 0–0 | 1–0 | 1–1 | 1–2 | 1–1 | 0–0 | 1–0 | 1–2 | 1–1 | 0–1 |
| Linces Celaya | 1–1 | 0–0 | 1–2 | 2–1 | 0–1 | 3–2 | 1–1 | 1–1 | 1–2 | 3–1 | — | 1–1 | 3–1 | 2–1 | 0–1 | 3–1 | 1–2 | 0–1 | 3–2 | 3–3 |
| Marte | 0–0 | 0–0 | 1–1 | 0–0 | 2–2 | 1–0 | 2–2 | 2–0 | 4–0 | 1–1 | 3–0 | — | 0–1 | 0–2 | 3–2 | 1–1 | 2–1 | 1–1 | 1–0 | 1–1 |
| Pioneros Cancún | 1–1 | 1–0 | 3–1 | 3–0 | 1–1 | 0–0 | 2–1 | 2–0 | 1–0 | 0–0 | 1–2 | 1–2 | — | 1–2 | 0–1 | 0–0 | 4–1 | 1–1 | 1–1 | 2–3 |
| SUOO | 1–0 | 0–2 | 1–1 | 3–2 | 1–1 | 1–2 | 2–1 | 0–0 | 0–0 | 1–0 | 4–1 | 1–1 | 2–1 | — | 5–3 | 2–0 | 1–0 | 0–1 | 2–1 | 1–2 |
| Tampico Madero | 1–1 | 2–0 | 5–0 | 4–0 | 1–0 | 5–2 | 2–1 | 1–0 | 2–0 | 3–1 | 3–1 | 3–0 | 3–0 | 4–2 | — | 1–2 | 3–0 | 1–0 | 5–2 | 1–0 |
| Tepatitlán | 3–1 | 1–0 | 0–2 | 3–0 | 0–0 | 0–0 | 2–0 | 0–0 | 0–1 | 2–1 | 0–0 | 1–1 | 2–0 | 2–2 | 1–1 | — | 3–1 | 2–1 | 2–1 | 0–0 |
| Tepic | 2–2 | 2–2 | 2–0 | 1–1 | 2–0 | 1–1 | 0–0 | 0–0 | 2–1 | 0–0 | 0–0 | 1–0 | 1–0 | 3–0 | 1–2 | 3–2 | — | 0–2 | 2–1 | 0–0 |
| UT Neza | 3–1 | 0–0 | 1–1 | 2–1 | 4–2 | 3–1 | 1–1 | 5–1 | 0–2 | 2–0 | 2–2 | 4–1 | 8–0 | 2–0 | 2–0 | 1–0 | 1–0 | — | 3–1 | 1–4 |
| Yucatán | 3–4 | 0–1 | 2–1 | 1–0 | 1–0 | 1–1 | 5–0 | 1–0 | 3–0 | 2–0 | 2–0 | 1–1 | 2–2 | 0–0 | 1–0 | 5–1 | 3–1 | 1–1 | — | 4–0 |
| Zacatepec | 2–1 | 3–1 | 5–1 | 1–0 | 2–1 | 1–1 | 3–1 | 3–0 | 0–0 | 1–0 | 0–1 | 4–0 | 3–0 | 1–0 | 2–2 | 2–0 | 4–0 | 2–2 | 2–2 | — |

Source: RSSSF
Legend: Blue = home team win; Yellow = draw; Red = away team win.

== Championship play-offs ==
=== Play-offs ===
Quarter-finals
2 | Tampico Madero | 2 | 2 | 4
6 | Celaya | 2 | 0 | 2
1 | UT Neza (*) | 1 | 2 | 3
7 | Atlético San Francisco | 2 | 2 | 4
3 | Zacatepec | 1 | 2 | 3
5 | Inter de Tijuana | 0 | 0 | 0
4 | Irapuato | 1 | 0 | 1
9 | Cobras | 2 | 2 | 4

Semi-finals
2 | Tampico Madero | 0 | 3 | 3
7 | Atlético San Francisco | 1 | 0 | 1
3 | Zacatepec | 0 | 3 | 3
9 | Cobras | 1 | 1 | 2

Final
2 | Tampico Madero | 2 | 2 | 4
3 | Zacatepec | 2 | 0 | 2

- (*) UT Neza advanced to the promotion final as best regular season record

=== Promotion final ===
| May 15, 1993 | Tampico Madero | 0–1 | UT Neza | Tampico and Ciudad Madero |
| | | Report | Ricardo Díaz Duarte 10' | Stadium: Estadio Tamaulipas |

| May 23, 1993 | UT Neza | 0–0 (1–0 agg.) | Tampico Madero | Mexico City |
| | | Report | | Stadium: Estadio Azulgrana |
