= 1990–91 Mexican Segunda División season =

Segunda División de México
- Season: 1990–91
- Champions: Atlante (2nd Title)
- Promoted: Cachorros Zamora; Guerreros Acapulco; Zitlaltepec
- Relegated: Guerreros Acapulco; Leones Saltillo; Zitlaltepec; Cachorros Zamora
- Matches played: 423
- Goals scored: 1,027 (2.43 per match)
- Top goalscorer: Jaime Ríos(23 goals)

The 1990–91 Segunda División was the 42nd season of the Mexican Segunda División. The season started on 3 August 1990 and concluded on 17 July 1991. It was won by Atlante.

== Changes ==
- León was promoted to Primera División.
- Atlante was relegated from Primera División.
- Querétaro was promoted to Primera División after bought the Tampico Madero franchise. Pioneros de Cancún bought the Querétaro spot in Segunda División.
- Cachorros Zamora and Guerreros Acapulco were promoted from Segunda División B.
- Zitlaltepec was promoted from Tercera División.
- SUOO, Galicia and Ayense were relegated from Segunda División.
- Petroleros Salina Cruz license was bought by Real Celaya.

== Teams ==
1990–91 season Teams

Club	City	Stadium
Atlante	Mexico City	Estadio Azulgrana
Atlético Potosino	San Luis Potosí	Estadio Plan de San Luis
Bachilleres	Guadalajara	Estadio Tecnológico UdeG
Cachorros Zamora	Zamora	Unidad Deportiva El Chamizal
Chetumal	Chetumal	Estadio José López Portillo
Ecatepec	Ecatepec de Morelos	Estadio Morelos
Guerreros Acapulco	Acapulco	Unidad Deportiva Acapulco
Inter de Tijuana	Tijuana	Estadio Cerro Colorado
Jalisco	Guadalajara	Estadio Jalisco; Club San Rafael
La Piedad	La Piedad	Estadio Juan N. López
Leones Saltillo	Saltillo	Estadio Olímpico Francisco I. Madero
Pachuca	Pachuca	Estadio Revolución Mexicana
Pioneros Cancún	Cancún	Estadio Cancún 86
Real Celaya	Celaya	Estadio Miguel Alemán Valdés
Tecomán	Tecomán	Estadio IAETAC
Tepic	Tepic	Estadio Nicolás Álvarez Ortega
UAQ	Querétaro City	Estadio Corregidora
Yucatán	Mérida	Estadio Carlos Iturralde
Zacatepec	Zacatepec	Estadio Agustín "Coruco" Díaz
Zitlaltepec	San Juan Zitlaltepec	Estadio Los Brujos

== Group stage ==
=== Group 1 ===
Pos	Team	Pld	W	D	L	GF	GA	GD	Pts	Qualification or relegation
1	Atlante (Q)	38	20	14	4	67	33	+34	71	Qualified to Playoffs
2	Pachuca (Q)	38	20	10	8	63	38	+25	63	Qualified to Playoffs
3	La Piedad	38	14	12	12	45	46	−1	49	
4	Tecomán	38	12	12	14	55	61	−6	47	
5	Jalisco	38	10	14	14	37	46	−9	41	

Source: RSSSF
(Q) Qualified for the phase indicated

=== Group 2 ===
Pos	Team	Pld	W	D	L	GF	GA	GD	Pts	Qualification or relegation
1	Pioneros Cancún (Q)	38	14	15	9	51	39	+12	55	Qualified to Playoffs
2	Inter de Tijuana (Q)	38	13	14	11	43	43	0	51	Qualified to Playoffs
3	Chetumal	38	15	11	12	35	42	−7	50	
4	Real Celaya	38	13	10	15	47	52	−5	44	
5	Cachorros Zamora (R)	38	8	4	26	43	76	−33	26	Relegated

Source: RSSSF
(Q) Qualified for the phase indicated; (R) Relegated

=== Group 3 ===
Pos	Team	Pld	W	D	L	GF	GA	GD	Pts	Qualification or relegation
1	Zacatepec (Q)	38	23	7	8	76	28	+48	73	Qualified to Playoffs
2	Yucatán (Q)	38	14	14	10	51	48	+3	53	Qualified to Playoffs
3	Tepic (Q)	38	16	10	12	42	37	+5	50	Qualified to Playoffs
4	Guerreros Acapulco (R)	38	11	6	21	38	50	−12	37	Relegated
5	Leones Saltillo (R)	38	9	9	20	37	65	−28	34	Relegated

Source: RSSSF
(Q) Qualified for the phase indicated; (R) Relegated

=== Group 4 ===
Pos	Team	Pld	W	D	L	GF	GA	GD	Pts	Qualification or relegation
1	Atlético Potosino (Q)	38	16	12	10	38	34	+4	53	Qualified to Playoffs
2	UAQ (Q)	38	14	8	16	55	50	+5	42	Qualified to Playoffs
3	Ecatepec	38	11	13	14	40	41	−1	42	
4	Bachilleres	38	11	12	15	39	50	−11	41	
5	Zitlaltepec (R)	38	9	7	22	34	57	−23	29	Relegated

Source: RSSSF
(Q) Qualified for the phase indicated; (R) Relegated

== Results ==
Home \ Away	ATL	ATP	BAC	CAZ	CHE	ECA	GAC	INT	JAL	LPD	LSA	PAC	PIO	RCE	TEC	TEP	UAQ	YUC	ZAC	ZIT
Atlante	—	3–0	0–0	4–1	2–0	3–1	1–0	2–1	1–3	4–1	5–0	1–4	0–4	2–0	4–1	2–0	4–1	3–0	1–0	2–0
Atlético Potosino	0–0	—	1–0	3–1	0–0	0–0	2–1	0–1	1–1	2–0	1–3	2–1	0–0	1–0	4–0	1–0	1–0	3–3	0–2	2–1
Bachilleres	0–0	0–1	—	3–1	3–0	0–0	1–1	3–3	0–1	2–0	1–0	4–1	1–0	2–1	1–1	0–2	2–1	0–0	0–3	0–0
Cachorros Zamora	1–3	0–1	3–0	—	5–1	2–0	2–0	2–0	2–0	1–2	1–1	0–1	0–0	1–2	1–1	1–0	1–0	2–3	1–1	0–1
Chetumal	0–0	1–1	2–0	2–1	—	2–0	2–1	0–0	2–2	1–1	1–1	1–0	0–0	3–1	1–0	0–0	2–0	1–0	1–0	3–1
Ecatepec	1–1	2–0	1–2	2–0	2–1	—	3–1	0–0	2–1	0–0	1–0	1–1	1–1	3–1	3–1	0–0	0–1	4–0	2–1	2–2
Guerreros Acapulco	0–0	1–0	0–1	3–0	2–3	2–2	—	1–2	1–1	1–2	1–0	0–1	1–2	2–0	1–2	1–1	2–0	2–0	0–3	2–0
Inter Tijuana	1–1	1–0	2–0	3–1	0–0	1–1	0–1	—	3–1	1–1	2–0	0–1	0–2	4–1	2–0	0–0	0–0	2–0	1–1	1–0
Jalisco	1–2	0–1	1–1	2–0	2–0	1–1	2–1	0–0	—	2–0	1–0	0–2	0–1	2–0	0–1	0–1	1–0	0–2	1–1	0–0
La Piedad	1–2	0–0	3–0	4–2	1–0	1–0	3–1	2–0	0–1	—	2–3	2–1	1–1	2–0	1–0	2–1	1–1	1–1	2–3	3–0
Leones Saltillo	1–1	1–2	5–1	2–0	0–2	0–1	0–1	1–1	1–0	0–0	—	1–1	1–1	1–1	1–2	2–1	2–0	2–3	1–4	3–0
Pachuca	2–2	1–1	1–0	3–2	1–0	1–0	5–2	7–1	2–0	3–2	1–0	—	1–1	2–0	0–0	1–1	2–1	1–1	1–2	2–0
Pioneros Cancún	1–1	0–0	0–4	2–0	3–0	2–0	1–0	1–1	2–0	4–1	1–2	3–1	—	2–0	0–0	1–2	2–2	0–0	2–1	3–3
Real Celaya	1–1	1–1	2–1	3–1	3–0	1–0	3–1	1–2	3–3	2–2	0–0	1–3	2–1	—	1–1	1–2	0–0	4–0	1–0	2–1
Tecomán	1–0	4–1	2–2	6–2	3–0	1–1	0–1	0–3	1–1	0–0	3–1	1–5	4–1	1–1	—	4–1	4–2	4–2	1–2	0–2
Tepic	2–2	0–2	1–1	2–0	1–0	1–0	0–1	2–1	2–2	1–0	1–0	0–0	4–3	0–1	3–0	—	2–1	1–0	0–2	3–0
UAQ	2–3	1–0	2–1	4–3	4–0	1–0	1–0	0–0	1–1	0–0	9–0	2–1	2–1	1–2	2–2	3–1	—	2–0	1–2	2–1
Yucatán	1–1	1–1	4–0	3–1	1–1	4–2	1–0	3–1	1–1	0–0	4–1	2–0	1–1	1–1	3–1	1–1	2–1	—	0–0	1–0
Zacatepec	0–0	2–0	3–1	6–0	0–1	2–0	1–1	4–2	5–0	5–0	6–0	0–0	2–0	1–3	3–0	1–0	3–1	2–1	—	2–1
Zitlaltepec	0–3	1–2	1–1	2–1	0–1	2–1	2–1	3–0	2–2	0–1	2–0	1–2	0–1	1–0	2–2	0–2	1–3	0–1	1–0	—

Source: RSSSF
Legend: Blue = home team win; Yellow = draw; Red = away team win.

== Final stage ==
=== Group 1 ===
Pos	Team	Pld	W	D	L	GF	GA	GD	Pts	Promotion	ATL	UAQ	ZAC	TEP	INT
1	Atlante (Q)	8	4	2	2	12	7	+5	13	Qualified to Final		4–0	1–0	3–1	2–0
2	UAQ	8	5	0	3	12	10	+2	13		3–0		2–1	1–0	5–2
3	Zacatepec	8	3	3	2	13	8	+5	12		2–2	2–0		3–0	3–1
4	Tepic	8	2	2	4	4	9	−5	6		0–0	1–0	1–1		1–0
5	Inter de Tijuana	8	2	1	5	6	13	−7	5		1–0	0–1	1–1	1–0	

Source: RSSSF
Rules for classification: 1st points; 2nd head-to-head points; 3rd head-to-head goal difference; 4th head-to-head goals scored; 5th goal difference; 6th number of goals scored
(Q) Qualified for the phase indicated

=== Group 2 ===
Pos	Team	Pld	W	D	L	GF	GA	GD	Pts	Promotion	PAC	ATP	YUC	PIO	AYE
1	Pachuca (Q)	8	3	3	2	8	6	+2	11	Qualified to Final		2–1	1–1	2–0	2–0
2	Atlético Potosino	8	1	6	1	8	7	+1	9		2–0		2–2	1–1	1–1
3	Yucatán	8	3	3	2	9	9	0	9		2–1	0–0		2–1	2–1
4	Pioneros Cancún	8	2	3	3	8	8	0	9		0–0	0–0	2–0		2–3
5	Ayense (Note: Ayense was invited to the Segunda División Promotion Playoff as Segunda División B champions.)	8	2	3	3	7	10	−3	8		0–0	1–1	1–0	0–2	

Source: RSSSF
Rules for classification: 1st points; 2nd head-to-head points; 3rd head-to-head goal difference; 4th head-to-head goals scored; 5th goal difference; 6th number of goals scored
(Q) Qualified for the phase indicated

=== Final ===
July 7, 1991	Pachuca	2–2	Atlante	Pachuca
		Report		Stadium: Estadio Revolución Mexicana

July 14, 1991	Atlante	0–0 (2–2 agg.)	Pachuca	Mexico City
		Report		Stadium: Estadio Azulgrana

July 17, 1991	Atlante	0–0 (9–8 p)	Pachuca	Puebla City
		Report		Stadium: Estadio Cuauhtémoc
