= 1991–92 Mexican Segunda División season =

Segunda División de México
- Season: 1991–92
- Champions: Pachuca (2nd Title)
- Promoted: Ayense; SUOO; Atlético Cuernavaca; Celaya
- Relegated: Chetumal; Tecomán; UAQ; Delfines Acapulco
- Matches played: 394
- Goals scored: 940 (2.39 per match)
- Top goalscorer: José Luis González (20 goals)

The 1991–92 Segunda División was the 43rd season of the Mexican Segunda División. The season started on 16 August 1991 and concluded on 14 June 1992. It was won by Pachuca.

As of this season, the system to define the champion changed, the two-group system was eliminated and they began to play in the Playoff format, starting in the quarterfinals.

== Changes ==
- Atlante was promoted to Primera División.
- Irapuato was relegated from Primera División.
- Ayense, SUOO and Atlético Cuernavaca were promoted from Segunda División B.
- Deportivo Celaya was promoted from Tercera División.
- Guerreros Acapulco, Cachorros Zamora, Leones Saltillo and Zitlaltepec were relegated from Segunda División.
- Atlético Potosino sold its franchise, the new owners moved the team to Tampico and Ciudad Madero, the team was renamed as Tampico Madero.
- Jalisco was relocated in Acapulco and renamed as Delfines de Acapulco due to owners change.
- Ecatepec sold its franchise to Universidad Tecnológica de Nezahualcóyotl, the team was relocated at Ciudad Nezahualcóyotl and renamed as UTN.

== Teams ==
1991–92 season Teams

Club	City	Stadium
Atlético Cuernavaca	Cuernavaca	Estadio Centenario
Ayense	Ayotlán	Estadio Chino Rivas
Bachilleres	Guadalajara	Club Deportivo U. de G.
Celaya	Celaya	Estadio Miguel Alemán Valdés
Chetumal	Chetumal	Estadio José López Portillo
Delfines Acapulco	Acapulco	Unidad Deportiva Acapulco
Inter de Tijuana	Tijuana	Estadio Cerro Colorado
Irapuato	Irapuato	Estadio Sergio León Chávez
La Piedad	La Piedad	Estadio Juan N. López
Linces Celaya	Celaya	Estadio Miguel Alemán Valdés
Pachuca	Pachuca	Estadio Revolución Mexicana
Pioneros Cancún	Cancún	Estadio Cancún 86
SUOO	Cuautitlán	Estadio Los Pinos
Tampico Madero	Tampico and Ciudad Madero	Estadio Tamaulipas
Tecomán	Tecomán	Estadio IAETAC
Tepic	Tepic	Estadio Nicolás Álvarez Ortega
UAQ	Querétaro City	Estadio Corregidora
UT Neza	Ciudad Nezahualcóyotl	Estadio Neza 86
Yucatán	Mérida	Estadio Carlos Iturralde
Zacatepec	Zacatepec	Estadio Agustín "Coruco" Díaz

== Group stage ==
=== Group 1 ===
Pos	Team	Pld	W	D	L	GF	GA	GD	Pts	Qualification or relegation
1	Irapuato (Q)	38	18	12	8	58	27	+31	61	Qualified to Playoffs
2	Bachilleres (Q)	38	14	8	16	42	44	−2	45	Qualified to Playoffs
3	Ayense	38	13	10	15	41	45	−4	45	
4	Tepic	38	12	11	15	31	45	−14	41	
5	Chetumal (R)	38	9	11	18	45	52	−7	34	Relegated

Source: RSSSF
(Q) Qualified for the phase indicated; (R) Relegated

=== Group 2 ===
Pos	Team	Pld	W	D	L	GF	GA	GD	Pts	Qualification or relegation
1	Zacatepec (Q)	38	16	12	10	59	39	+20	59	Qualified to Playoffs
2	Inter de Tijuana (Q)	38	18	12	8	53	35	+18	59	Qualified to Playoffs
3	La Piedad	38	16	13	9	51	38	+13	55	
4	SUOO	38	13	10	15	35	36	−1	44	
5	Delfines Acapulco (R)	38	10	12	16	36	56	−20	38	Relegated

Source: RSSSF
(Q) Qualified for the phase indicated; (R) Relegated

=== Group 3 ===
Pos	Team	Pld	W	D	L	GF	GA	GD	Pts	Qualification or relegation
1	Pachuca (Q)	38	20	12	6	69	35	+34	69	Qualified to Playoffs
2	Yucatán (Q)	38	17	11	10	45	32	+13	57	Qualified to Playoffs
3	Atlético Cuernavaca	38	12	11	15	35	50	−15	43	
4	UT Neza	38	13	7	18	43	58	−15	41	
5	Tecomán (R)	38	11	11	16	39	57	−18	38	Relegated

Source: RSSSF
(Q) Qualified for the phase indicated; (R) Relegated

=== Group 4 ===
Pos	Team	Pld	W	D	L	GF	GA	GD	Pts	Qualification or relegation
1	Pioneros Cancún (Q)	38	17	10	11	55	43	+12	55	Qualified to Playoffs
2	Tampico Madero (Q)	38	12	12	14	49	52	−3	46	Qualified to Playoffs
3	Celaya	38	14	5	19	36	52	−16	40	
4	Linces Celaya	38	10	12	16	40	47	−7	39	
5	UAQ (R)	38	11	6	21	51	70	−19	38	Relegated

Source: RSSSF
(Q) Qualified for the phase indicated; (R) Relegated

== Results ==
Home \ Away	ATC	AYE	BAC	CEL	CHE	DEL	INT	IRA	LPD	LIN	PAC	PIO	SUO	TAM	TEC	TEP	UAQ	UTN	YUC	ZAC
Atlético Cuernavaca	—	1–0	0–0	1–0	0–0	0–0	0–0	1–1	3–1	2–0	0–0	2–0	0–1	0–0	1–2	0–3	1–0	0–2	0–0	1–0
Ayense	1–2	—	2–2	3–1	1–1	3–1	1–0	0–2	2–1	0–1	0–0	0–0	2–1	3–0	2–0	0–0	2–1	2–2	0–0	0–1
Bachilleres	3–2	2–1	—	1–2	2–0	2–0	2–3	0–0	2–1	0–1	0–0	2–0	0–2	1–1	5–1	2–0	3–4	1–0	1–0	0–1
Celaya	0–1	2–1	0–1	—	2–0	1–0	1–1	2–1	1–0	2–3	1–1	0–1	0–1	2–1	1–1	2–3	2–1	2–0	1–2	1–0
Chetumal	8–1	1–2	2–0	4–0	—	2–1	2–3	2–0	1–1	0–1	1–0	2–1	0–0	0–1	1–2	3–0	2–2	1–0	0–0	1–1
Delfines Acapulco	0–1	1–1	1–0	2–0	3–0	—	0–2	1–4	0–0	0–0	3–2	0–0	1–0	3–0	3–1	1–0	3–1	2–3	0–1	1–1
Inter Tijuana	3–2	0–2	1–0	1–0	3–1	4–0	—	1–1	1–1	1–0	0–2	5–2	0–0	1–0	2–0	3–0	1–0	2–0	2–0	2–1
Irapuato	5–1	1–2	1–0	4–0	2–1	4–0	1–1	—	0–0	2–0	2–3	1–0	0–1	2–1	3–0	1–0	2–0	3–0	0–0	3–0
La Piedad	1–1	0–0	3–0	4–0	1–0	4–1	1–1	1–0	—	2–2	2–1	2–4	1–0	3–1	2–0	3–0	2–0	2–0	2–1	2–1
Linces Celaya	2–2	1–0	0–1	2–1	2–1	1–1	3–0	1–4	0–0	—	1–1	0–0	1–1	2–3	2–0	0–1	2–3	1–2	1–2	1–1
Pachuca	3–2	3–1	1–1	2–0	2–2	4–1	2–0	1–1	3–0	0–1	—	3–1	2–1	2–1	0–0	4–0	4–1	3–1	3–1	4–1
Pioneros Cancún	2–1	2–0	1–1	3–1	4–3	0–0	0–0	1–0	3–0	3–2	0–0	—	3–3	1–0	3–1	2–0	3–0	3–0	2–0	1–0
SUOO	0–0	0–1	1–0	2–0	1–0	0–2	1–0	0–0	1–1	0–0	0–1	1–1	—	4–0	1–0	2–0	3–1	0–2	1–0	1–1
Tampico Madero	3–1	1–1	1–1	1–1	2–0	3–0	1–1	0–1	1–1	5–4	1–2	1–0	3–1	—	1–1	2–0	3–0	0–1	3–3	2–2
Tecomán	1–0	1–0	0–2	1–2	2–0	0–0	1–1	2–2	1–1	1–0	1–1	2–1	2–1	1–3	—	0–1	2–0	3–3	2–1	3–1
Tepic	1–2	1–0	0–2	1–0	1–1	2–2	0–0	0–0	1–0	1–0	1–2	2–1	3–1	0–0	0–0	—	0–0	0–0	0–1	2–1
UAQ	0–1	4–1	2–1	0–1	2–0	1–1	3–3	1–1	1–2	1–1	1–7	2–3	3–1	1–2	3–1	1–2	—	2–0	2–0	3–0
UT Neza	3–1	2–3	3–1	0–2	1–1	5–0	0–4	0–2	0–1	2–1	0–0	2–1	1–0	1–0	2–1	2–2	1–3	—	1–2	0–0
Yucatán	2–1	3–0	3–0	0–1	4–0	1–1	1–0	1–1	3–1	0–0	2–0	3–1	1–0	0–0	1–1	3–2	1–0	2–0	—	0–2
Zacatepec	2–0	3–1	3–0	1–1	1–1	2–0	3–0	2–0	1–1	1–0	3–0	1–1	3–1	4–1	4–1	1–1	5–1	4–1	0–0	—

Source: RSSSF
Legend: Blue = home team win; Yellow = draw; Red = away team win.

== Promotion play-offs ==
Quarter-finals
1	Pachuca	0	2	2
8	Bachilleres	0	0	0
4	Inter de Tijuana (p.)	0	0	0 (3)
5	Yucatán	0	0	0 (1)
2	Irapuato (p.)	1	3	4 (5)
7	Tampico Madero	2	2	4 (4)
3	Zacatepec	2	2	4
6	Pioneros Cancún	2	0	2

Semi-finals
1	Pachuca	0	2	2
4	Inter de Tijuana	1	0	1
2	Irapuato	1	0	1
3	Zacatepec	3	0	3

Final
1	Pachuca (p.)	1	1	2 (11)
3	Zacatepec	2	0	2 (10)

=== Final ===
June 7, 1992	Zacatepec	2–1	Pachuca	Zacatepec
16:00		Report		Stadium: Estadio Agustín "Coruco" Díaz

June 14, 1992	Pachuca	1–0 (2–2 agg.) (11–10 p)	Zacatepec	Pachuca
12:00		Report		Stadium: Estadio Revolución Mexicana
