= 1989–90 Mexican Segunda División season =

Segunda División de México
- Season: 1989–90
- Champions: León (1st Title)
- Promoted: Bachilleres; Galicia; Ayense
- Relegated: SUOO; Galicia; Ayense
- Matches played: 406
- Goals scored: 1,023 (2.52 per match)
- Top goalscorer: Jaime Ríos; Raúl Torales (21 goals)

The 1989–90 Segunda División was the 41st season of the Mexican Segunda División. The season started on 18 August 1989 and concluded on 3 June 1990. It was won by León.

== Changes ==
- Potros Neza won the promotion to Primera División. However, because the club was the Atlante reserves team, the spot in the Division was bought by Veracruz.
- Atlético Potosino was relegated from Primera División.
- Bachilleres and Galicia were promoted from Segunda División B.
- Ayense was promoted from Tercera División.
- Tapatío, Pioneros Cancún and FEG were relegated from Segunda División.
- Orizaba franchise was bought by new owners, the team was relocated at Tijuana and renamed as Inter de Tijuana.

=== During the season ===
- Before week 18, Nuevo León was sold, the new owners relocated the team in Saltillo and renamed it as Leones de Saltillo.

== Teams ==
1989–90 season Teams

Club	City	Stadium
Atlético Potosino	San Luis Potosí	Estadio Plan de San Luis
Ayense	Ayotlán	Estadio Chino Rivas
Bachilleres	Guadalajara	Estadio Tecnológico UdeG
Chetumal	Chetumal	Estadio José López Portillo
Ecatepec	Ecatepec de Morelos	Estadio Morelos
Galicia	Cuernavaca	Estadio Centenario
Inter de Tijuana	Tijuana	Estadio Cerro Colorado
Jalisco	Guadalajara	Estadio Jalisco
La Piedad	La Piedad	Estadio Juan N. López
León	León	Estadio Nou Camp
Nuevo León; Leones Saltillo	Monterrey; Saltillo	Estadio Tecnológico; Estadio Olímpico Francisco I. Madero
Pachuca	Pachuca	Estadio Revolución Mexicana
Petroleros de Salina Cruz	Salina Cruz	Estadio Heriberto Kehoe Vincent
Querétaro	Querétaro City	Estadio Corregidora
SUOO	Cuautitlán	Estadio Los Pinos
Tecomán	Tecomán	Estadio IAETAC
Tepic	Tepic	Estadio Nicolás Álvarez Ortega
UAQ	Querétaro City	Estadio Corregidora
Yucatán	Mérida	Estadio Carlos Iturralde
Zacatepec	Zacatepec	Estadio Agustín "Coruco" Díaz

== Group stage ==
=== Group 1 ===
Pos	Team	Pld	W	D	L	GF	GA	GD	Pts	Qualification or relegation
1	Tepic (Q)	38	19	12	7	53	32	+21	62	Qualified to Playoffs
2	Ecatepec (Q)	38	17	12	9	50	34	+16	59	Qualified to Playoffs
3	Yucatán	38	15	9	14	57	49	+8	51	
4	Atlético Potosino	38	13	13	12	41	40	+1	45	
5	SUOO (R)	38	8	8	22	34	73	−39	29	Relegated

Source: RSSSF
(Q) Qualified for the phase indicated; (R) Relegated

=== Group 2 ===
Pos	Team	Pld	W	D	L	GF	GA	GD	Pts	Qualification or relegation
1	Inter de Tijuana (Q)	38	19	13	6	50	32	+18	63	Qualified to Playoffs
2	Chetumal (Q)	38	15	13	10	53	48	+5	55	Qualified to Playoffs
3	La Piedad	38	17	8	13	49	47	+2	54	
4	Jalisco	38	10	10	18	40	53	−13	37	
5	Galicia (R)	38	8	6	24	30	58	−28	28	Relegated

Source: RSSSF
(Q) Qualified for the phase indicated; (R) Relegated

=== Group 3 ===
Pos	Team	Pld	W	D	L	GF	GA	GD	Pts	Qualification or relegation
1	UAQ (Q)	38	19	13	6	66	46	+20	58	Qualified to Playoffs
2	Pachuca (Q)	38	16	12	10	50	34	+16	53	Qualified to Playoffs
3	Bachilleres	38	15	7	16	47	50	−3	47	
4	Nuevo León/Leones Saltillo	38	11	12	15	48	55	−7	41	
5	Tecomán	38	10	9	19	50	62	−12	37	Relegated

Source: RSSSF
(Q) Qualified for the phase indicated

=== Group 4 ===
Pos	Team	Pld	W	D	L	GF	GA	GD	Pts	Qualification or relegation
1	Zacatepec (Q)	38	18	8	12	56	37	+19	57	Qualified to Playoffs
2	León (Q)	38	16	11	11	54	30	+24	54	Qualified to Playoffs
3	Querétaro	38	16	11	11	51	49	+2	52	
4	Petroleros Salina Cruz	38	12	8	18	36	54	−18	41	
5	Ayense (R)	38	5	13	20	32	64	−32	27	Relegated

Source: RSSSF
(Q) Qualified for the phase indicated; (R) Relegated

== Results ==
Home \ Away	ATP	AYE	BAC	CHE	ECA	GAL	INT	JAL	LPD	LEO	NLS	PAC	PET	QUE	SUO	TEC	TEP	UAQ	YUC	ZAC
Atlético Potosino	—	2–2	1–1	1–0	3–2	2–1	1–1	1–0	2–0	1–0	4–0	0–0	0–1	2–0	3–1	1–1	2–0	0–0	1–0	1–0
Ayense	0–1	—	1–1	0–0	1–0	0–0	1–2	1–1	0–0	0–2	1–2	1–1	1–0	1–1	1–2	1–2	0–1	1–2	2–3	3–2
Bachilleres	1–0	1–2	—	1–2	0–2	2–1	0–0	0–1	0–3	3–2	1–0	1–1	3–0	4–0	4–0	2–2	0–0	2–0	0–1	1–0
Chetumal	4–2	1–1	1–0	—	1–1	4–1	0–0	3–1	3–1	2–2	2–1	1–1	0–0	4–0	3–0	3–1	0–0	4–3	0–2	1–5
Ecatepec	1–0	2–1	2–2	0–0	—	0–1	0–0	2–1	0–1	0–2	3–0	1–0	1–1	0–0	3–1	2–0	0–0	1–1	2–0	2–0
Galicia	1–1	1–1	0–2	0–1	1–2	—	0–1	0–1	0–1	0–3	3–2	1–2	0–1	1–2	0–1	3–0	3–1	1–0	2–2	1–2
Inter Tijuana	2–0	3–0	4–0	2–2	2–1	2–0	—	1–2	2–1	1–0	1–0	0–0	1–2	2–0	1–1	2–2	1–0	1–0	1–0	2–0
Jalisco	1–1	1–1	0–2	1–0	1–1	1–1	0–1	—	0–1	0–3	0–2	1–2	0–1	1–1	2–1	4–2	0–1	2–1	4–1	2–0
La Piedad	2–0	2–2	2–1	1–0	0–2	2–0	0–0	1–0	—	1–0	2–1	2–0	0–0	4–2	2–2	1–3	2–3	3–1	2–0	2–2
León	1–0	3–0	1–0	1–2	1–1	3–1	5–0	1–1	0–1	—	1–0	0–0	0–1	2–2	3–0	4–2	2–1	2–1	0–1	0–0
Nuevo León-Leones	2–2	2–0	2–0	4–2	1–2	3–0	2–2	3–2	4–4	0–0	—	2–1	0–1	0–0	4–0	1–0	0–0	1–1	1–1	1–0
Pachuca	4–1	3–0	4–0	2–1	1–3	0–0	1–0	0–0	1–0	2–2	0–0	—	5–0	0–1	1–0	2–1	2–2	2–1	2–1	0–1
Petroleros SC	1–1	3–0	0–1	0–1	1–4	3–1	4–2	2–3	0–1	1–1	0–0	0–1	—	3–2	2–1	3–0	0–0	2–3	1–1	1–0
Querétaro	1–1	1–2	4–1	4–1	0–0	0–1	3–1	1–0	2–1	1–0	2–2	2–1	3–1	—	2–2	2–1	1–0	1–1	3–1	2–1
SUOO	0–0	1–0	1–2	3–0	1–2	0–1	2–1	1–1	1–1	0–4	1–0	2–4	3–1	0–1	—	2–0	1–4	1–1	1–2	0–2
Tecomán	1–1	0–0	1–3	1–1	2–2	2–0	0–1	2–1	2–0	0–1	2–1	0–1	2–0	1–1	6–0	—	4–2	3–1	2–3	1–2
Tepic	1–0	5–2	1–0	0–0	2–0	1–0	1–1	1–0	2–0	1–1	3–1	1–0	1–0	3–1	5–1	2–0	—	4–2	3–2	0–0
UAQ	2–1	2–1	4–1	4–0	2–0	2–1	2–2	5–2	4–1	1–1	4–0	1–0	1–0	0–1	2–0	2–0	2–0	—	2–0	1–0
Yucatán	4–1	5–0	1–2	1–1	2–3	0–1	0–1	2–2	3–1	1–0	3–3	2–1	4–0	1–0	2–0	1–1	0–0	3–1	—	0–1
Zacatepec	1–0	3–1	3–2	0–2	1–0	5–1	1–1	3–0	2–0	1–0	4–0	2–2	4–1	2–1	0–0	3–0	1–1	1–3	1–1	—

Source: RSSSF
Legend: Blue = home team win; Yellow = draw; Red = away team win.

== Final stage ==
=== Group 1 ===
Pos	Team	Pld	W	D	L	GF	GA	GD	Pts	Promotion	LEO	UAQ	TEP	CHE
1	León (Q)	6	4	1	1	16	6	+10	13	Qualified to final		1–3	2–0	3–0
2	UAQ	6	4	0	2	12	10	+2	9		2–6		2–0	2–1
3	Tepic	6	3	1	2	7	5	+2	9		1–1	1–0		3–0
4	Chetumal	6	0	0	6	2	16	−14	0		0–3	1–3	0–2	

Source: RSSSF
Rules for classification: 1st points; 2nd head-to-head points; 3rd head-to-head goal difference; 4th head-to-head goals scored; 5th goal difference; 6th number of goals scored
(Q) Qualified for the phase indicated

=== Group 2 ===
Pos	Team	Pld	W	D	L	GF	GA	GD	Pts	Promotion	INT	ZAC	PAC	ECA
1	Inter de Tijuana (Note: Inter Tijuana won the group due to better performance in the regular season.) (Q)	6	4	1	1	11	7	+4	12	Qualified to final		2–2	3–1	1–0
2	Zacatepec (Q)	6	3	3	0	10	4	+6	12		2–0		2–0	2–0
3	Pachuca	6	2	1	3	10	11	−1	7		1–2	2–2		3–1
4	Ecatepec	6	0	1	5	3	12	−9	1		1–3	0–0	1–3	

Source: RSSSF
Rules for classification: 1st points; 2nd head-to-head points; 3rd head-to-head goal difference; 4th head-to-head goals scored; 5th goal difference; 6th number of goals scored
(Q) Qualified for the phase indicated

=== Final ===
May 27, 1990	León	3–0	Inter de Tijuana	León
	Carlos Turrubiates 44'; Martín Peña 72', 75'	Report		Stadium: Estadio Nou Camp

June 3, 1990	Inter de Tijuana	1–1 (1–4 agg.)	León	Tijuana
	Mario Vázquez 80'	Report	Juan Andrade 42'	Stadium: Estadio Cerro Colorado
