= 1994–95 Primera División A season =

Season of a Mexican football league

Ascenso MX
- Season: 1994–95
- Champions: Celaya (1st Title)
- Promoted: Celaya
- Relegated: Tabasco

Primera División A (Méxican First A Division) 1994-95 is a Mexican football tournament. This was the first tournament played, the newly created league took over the Second division. 15 clubs played the tournament in order to earn promotion to the first division at the end of the tournament A. Celaya earn the Promotion and Tabasco was relegated to the Second Division.

== Stadium and locations ==
Club	Stadium	Capacity	City
Acapulco	Unidad Deportiva Acapulco	13,000	Acapulco, Guerrero
Aguascalientes	Municipal	12,500	Aguascalientes, Aguascalientes
Atlético Celaya	Miguel Alemán Valdés	30,000	Celaya, Guanajuato
Irapuato	Sergio León Chávez	35,000	Irapuato, Guanajuato
La Piedad	Juan N. López	13,000	La Piedad, Michoacán
Marte	Mariano Matamoros	18,000	Xochitepec, Morelos
Pachuca	Hidalgo	30,000	Pachuca, Hidalgo
San Luis	Plan de San Luis	20,000	San Luis Potosí, San Luis Potosí
San Francisco	San Francisco	11,500	San Francisco del Rincón, Guanajuato
Tabasco	Olímpico de Villahermosa	12,000	Villahermosa, Tabasco
Tepic	Nicolás Álvarez Ortega	7,000	Tepic, Nayarit
Tijuana Stars	Cerro Colorado	14,000	Tijuana, Baja California
U.A. Querétaro	Corregidora	35,000	Querétaro, Querétaro
Yucatán	Carlos Iturralde	20,000	Mérida, Yucatán
Zacatepec	Agustín Coruco Díaz	18,000	Zacatepec, Morelos

Location of teams in the 1994–95 Primera División A

== Group league tables ==
=== Group 1 ===
Pos	Team	Pld	W	D	L	GF	GA	GD	Pts	Qualification
1	San Luis F.C.	28	14	5	9	39	38	+1	33	Qualifies for the Liguilla
2	Tijuana Stars	28	11	8	9	35	28	+7	30	Qualifies for the Liguilla
3	Irapuato FC	28	11	8	9	37	35	+2	30	Qualifies for the Liguilla
4	Tabasco	28	3	10	15	19	50	−31	16	

Source: FMF
Rules for classification: 1st points; 2nd goal difference; 3rd goals scored; 4th head-to-head; 5th away goals scored; 6th draw

=== Group 2 ===
Pos	Team	Pld	W	D	L	GF	GA	GD	Pts	Qualification
1	A.S Francisco	28	13	7	8	35	29	+6	33	Qualifies for the Liguilla
2	U.A. Querétaro	28	8	13	7	29	25	+4	29	Qualifies for the Liguilla
3	C.F. La Piedad	28	8	12	8	35	33	+2	28	
4	Aguascalientes	28	4	13	11	27	44	−17	21	

Source: FMF
Rules for classification: 1st points; 2nd goal difference; 3rd goals scored; 4th head-to-head; 5th away goals scored; 6th draw

=== Group 3 ===
Pos	Team	Pld	W	D	L	GF	GA	GD	Pts	Qualification
1	Pachuca	28	15	7	6	66	33	+33	37	Qualifies for the Liguilla
2	A. Celaya	28	11	11	6	37	28	+9	33	Qualifies for the Liguilla
3	Acapulco	28	10	7	11	29	40	−11	27	
4	A. Yucatán	28	9	7	12	39	45	−6	25	

Source: FMF
Rules for classification: 1st points; 2nd goal difference; 3rd goals scored; 4th head-to-head; 5th away goals scored; 6th draw

=== Group 4 ===
Pos	Team	Pld	W	D	L	GF	GA	GD	Pts	Qualification
1	Marte	28	12	5	11	42	34	+8	29	Qualifies for the Liguilla
2	Zacatepec	28	10	6	12	44	41	+3	26	Qualifies for the Liguilla
3	Tepic	28	8	7	13	29	41	−12	23	

Source: FMF
Rules for classification: 1st points; 2nd goal difference; 3rd goals scored; 4th head-to-head; 5th away goals scored; 6th draw

== General league table ==
Pos	Team	Pld	W	D	L	GF	GA	GD	Pts	Qualification
1	Pachuca	28	15	7	6	66	33	+33	37	Qualifies for the Liguilla
2	A. Celaya	28	11	11	6	37	28	+9	33	Qualifies for the Liguilla
3	A.S Francisco	28	13	7	8	35	29	+6	33	Qualifies for the Liguilla
4	San Luis F.C.	28	14	5	9	39	38	+1	33	Qualifies for the Liguilla
5	Tijuana Stars	28	11	8	9	35	28	+7	30	Qualifies for the Liguilla
6	Irapuato FC	28	11	8	9	37	35	+2	30	Qualifies for the Liguilla
7	Marte	28	12	5	11	42	34	+8	29	Qualifies for the Liguilla
8	U.A. Querétaro	28	8	13	7	29	25	+4	29	Qualifies for the Liguilla
9	C.F. La Piedad	28	8	12	8	35	33	+2	28	
10	Acapulco	28	10	7	11	29	40	−11	27	
11	Zacatepec	28	10	6	12	44	41	+3	26	Qualifies for the Liguilla
12	A. Yucatán	28	9	7	12	39	45	−6	25	
13	Tepic	28	8	7	13	29	41	−12	23	
14	Aguascalientes	28	4	13	11	27	44	−17	21	
15	Tabasco	28	3	10	15	19	50	−31	16	Last on the relegation table

Source: FMF
Rules for classification: 1st points; 2nd goal difference; 3rd goals scored; 4th head-to-head; 5th away goals scored; 6th draw

== Regular season ==
Home \ Away	ACA	AGS	ATC	IRA	LAP	MAR	PAC	SNL	SFR	TAB	TEP	TJS	UAQ	YUC	ZAC
Acapulco		3–1	0–0	1–1	1–0	2–2	1–2	3–0	1–0	1–1	2–1	1–1	0–0	2–1	2–1
Aguascalientes	1–1		2–3	1–2	1–1	1–2	1–1	2–2	0–0	2–1	1–0	1–1	1–0	0–1	1–0
At. Celaya	3–1	1–1		2–1	1–1	0–2	2–1	6–0	1–2	1–1	1–0	3–1	1–1	1–1	2–0
Irapuato	0–1	1–1	2–3		1–1	2–1	3–5	2–1	1–0	0–0	0–0	1–0	1–0	2–0	2–1
La Piedad	4–1	2–2	1–1	2–1		2–1	1–2	2–2	0–3	3–0	0–0	1–0	1–0	6–1	1–1
Marte	2–1	2–0	1–0	3–2	0–0		2–1	3–1	1–2	2–0	2–1	1–1	0–0	5–2	2–2
Pachuca	1–0	6–0	3–0	0–0	2–1	2–1		0–1	3–3	9–0	6–0	2–1	0–1	2–1	6–0
San Luis	3–0	1–1	0–1	0–2	2–1	2–1	4–1		1–2	3–0	2–1	1–0	1–3	1–0	2–0
San Francisco	2–1	2–2	0–1	2–1	1–1	1–0	1–1	2–2		1–0	0–1	0–0	1–3	3–0	2–0
Tabasco	0–1	2–1	1–1	0–1	0–1	1–0	1–3	0–1	0–1		1–1	3–1	2–2	1–1	0–0
Tepic	5–0	2–1	1–1	3–0	1–1	1–0	0–1	1–2	1–2	2–0		0–0	2–1	2–1	3–1
Tijuana Stars	1–0	1–1	2–0	2–1	1–2	1–0	0–0	1–1	3–0	1–0	7–1		1–0	2–0	0–2
U.A. Querétaro	0–1	3–1	0–0	2–2	1–0	2–1	1–1	0–2	2–0	1–1	1–1	0–1		1–1	2–1
Yucatán	3–1	1–1	1–0	1–1	2–0	3–2	4–4	0–1	0–1	2–1	4–0	3–4	1–1		1–0
Zacatepec	4–1	2–0	1–1	1–1	4–0	1–3	3–1	3–0	2–1	7–2	3–0	1–0	2–2	1–3	

Updated to match(es) played on 25 June 1995. Source: Memoria Futbolera (subscription required)
Legend: Blue = home team win; Yellow = draw; Red = away team win.

== Liguilla ==
=== Repechaje ===
Home	Team	Score	Visitor	Global
1	Zacatepec	2-1	Irapuato FC	
2	Irapuato FC	1-2	Zacatepec	2-4

=== Group A ===
Pos	Team	Pld	W	D	L	GF	GA	GD	Pts	PAC	SNL	TJS	ZAC
1	Pachuca	6	3	2	1	15	7	+8	8		7–1	2–0	2–0
2	San Luis	6	2	3	1	9	9	0	7	1–0		2–2	1–0
3	Tijuana	6	3	1	2	10	11	−1	7	3–1	2–2		1–0
4	Zacatepec	6	0	2	4	4	11	−7	2	0–3	1–1	3–3	

Updated to match(es) played on 25 June 1995. Source: Memoria Futbolera (subscription required)

=== Group B ===
Pos	Team	Pld	W	D	L	GF	GA	GD	Pts	ATC	SFR	UAQ	MAR
1	A. Celaya	6	3	1	2	11	9	+2	7		3–0	4–2	2–0
2	A.S Francisco	6	3	1	2	7	8	−1	7	1–0		1–0	3–1
3	U.A. Querétaro	6	2	1	3	11	9	+2	5	4–1	2–2		2–0
4	C.D. Marte	6	2	1	3	5	8	−3	5	1–1	2–0	1–0	

Updated to match(es) played on 25 June 1995. Source: Memoria Futbolera (subscription required)

=== Final round ===
Semi–finals
1	Pachuca	1	5	6
4	San Luis	1	1	2
2	At. Celaya (s)	1	1	2
3	San Francisco	1	1	2

Final
1	Pachuca	0	0	0
2	At. Celaya	0	1	1

==== Semi-finals ====
Team 1	Agg.	Team 2	1st leg	2nd leg
Atlético Celaya (s)	2–2	Atlético San Francisco	1–1	1–1
Pachuca	6–2	Real San Luis	1–1	5–1

==== Final ====
Team 1	Agg.	Team 2	1st leg	2nd leg
Pachuca	0–1	Atlético Celaya	0–0	0–1

1994-95:

1st title

== Top scorers ==
Scorer	Goals	Team
(Brazil) Marco A. De Almedia	15	Marte

Last updated: May 3, 2008.
Source: FMF

Last updated: January 20, 2012.
Source: Senorgol
