= 1988–89 Mexican Segunda División season =

Segunda División de México
- Season: 1988–89
- Champions: Potros Neza (1st Title)
- Promoted: Pachuca; Nuevo León; Ecatepec
- Relegated: Tapatío; Pioneros Cancún; FEG
- Matches played: 419
- Goals scored: 1,074 (2.56 per match)
- Top goalscorer: Gastón Obledo (19 goals)

The 1988–89 Segunda División was the 40th season of the Mexican Segunda División. The season started on 2 September 1988 and concluded on 18 July 1989. It was won by Potros Neza.

== Changes ==
- Cobras was promoted to Primera División.
- UAT was relegated from Primera División. However, the team board bought the Deportivo Neza franchise and remained in Primera División. The relegated UAT franchise was bought by Atlante, placed in Ciudad Nezahualcóyotl and renamed Potros Neza, this team was an Atlante reserves squad.
- Santos Laguna was promoted to Primera División after bought the Ángeles de Puebla franchise. Querétaro taken the Santos Laguna spot in Segunda División.
- Pachuca and Nuevo León were promoted from Segunda División B.
- Ecatepec was promoted from Tercera División.
- Oaxaca, Texcoco and Águila Progreso Industrial were relegated from Segunda División.
- Apatzingán sold its franchise to Yucatán.

== Teams ==
1988–89 season Teams

| Club | City | Stadium |
|---|---|---|
| Chetumal | Chetumal | Estadio José López Portillo |
| Ecatepec | Ecatepec de Morelos | Estadio Morelos |
| FEG | Guadalajara | Estadio Tecnológico UdeG |
| Jalisco | Guadalajara | Estadio Jalisco |
| La Piedad | La Piedad | Estadio Juan N. López |
| León | León | Estadio Nou Camp |
| Nuevo León | Monterrey | Estadio Tecnológico |
| Orizaba | Orizaba | Estadio Socum |
| Pachuca | Pachuca | Estadio Revolución Mexicana |
| Petroleros de Salina Cruz | Salina Cruz | Estadio Heriberto Kehoe Vincent |
| Pioneros Cancún | Cancún | Estadio Cancún 86 |
| Potros Neza | Ciudad Nezahualcóyotl | Estadio Neza 86 |
| Querétaro | Querétaro City | Estadio Corregidora |
| SUOO | Cuautitlán | Estadio Los Pinos |
| Tapatío | Guadalajara | Estadio Anacleto Macías |
| Tecomán | Tecomán | Estadio IAETAC |
| Tepic | Tepic | Estadio Nicolás Álvarez Ortega |
| UAQ | Querétaro City | Estadio Corregidora |
| Yucatán | Mérida | Estadio Carlos Iturralde |
| Zacatepec | Zacatepec | Estadio Agustín "Coruco" Díaz |

== Group stage ==
=== Group 1 ===
| Pos | Team | Pld | W | D | L | GF | GA | GD | Pts | Qualification or relegation |
|---|---|---|---|---|---|---|---|---|---|---|
| 1 | La Piedad (Q) | 38 | 18 | 12 | 8 | 49 | 31 | +18 | 60 | Qualified to Playoffs |
| 2 | UAQ (Q) | 38 | 18 | 9 | 11 | 59 | 45 | +14 | 59 | Qualified to Playoffs |
| 3 | León | 38 | 15 | 15 | 8 | 56 | 37 | +19 | 56 | |
| 4 | Petroleros Salina Cruz | 38 | 10 | 18 | 10 | 43 | 46 | −3 | 43 | |
| 5 | FEG (R) | 38 | 6 | 12 | 20 | 33 | 52 | −19 | 28 | Relegated |

Source: RSSSF
(Q) Qualified for the phase indicated; (R) Relegated

=== Group 2 ===
| Pos | Team | Pld | W | D | L | GF | GA | GD | Pts | Qualification or relegation |
|---|---|---|---|---|---|---|---|---|---|---|
| 1 | Nuevo León (Q) | 38 | 15 | 13 | 10 | 54 | 37 | +17 | 53 | Qualified to Playoffs |
| 2 | Jalisco (Q) | 38 | 14 | 14 | 10 | 57 | 44 | +13 | 53 | Qualified to Playoffs |
| 3 | Chetumal | 38 | 14 | 12 | 12 | 42 | 36 | +6 | 48 | |
| 4 | Querétaro | 38 | 13 | 11 | 14 | 52 | 58 | −6 | 44 | |
| 5 | Tapatío | 38 | 9 | 14 | 15 | 47 | 52 | −5 | 40 | Relegation Group |

Source: RSSSF
(Q) Qualified for the phase indicated

=== Group 3 ===
| Pos | Team | Pld | W | D | L | GF | GA | GD | Pts | Qualification or relegation |
|---|---|---|---|---|---|---|---|---|---|---|
| 1 | Potros Neza (Q) | 38 | 17 | 11 | 10 | 53 | 39 | +14 | 56 | Qualified to Playoffs |
| 2 | Yucatán (Q) | 38 | 14 | 12 | 12 | 56 | 60 | −4 | 51 | Qualified to Playoffs |
| 3 | Pachuca | 38 | 15 | 6 | 17 | 53 | 66 | −13 | 47 | |
| 4 | Orizaba | 38 | 12 | 12 | 14 | 44 | 50 | −6 | 43 | |
| 5 | Tepic | 38 | 10 | 14 | 14 | 48 | 63 | −15 | 39 | Relegation Group |

Source: RSSSF
(Q) Qualified for the phase indicated

=== Group 4 ===
| Pos | Team | Pld | W | D | L | GF | GA | GD | Pts | Qualification or relegation |
|---|---|---|---|---|---|---|---|---|---|---|
| 1 | Zacatepec (Q) | 38 | 18 | 8 | 12 | 57 | 38 | +19 | 56 | Qualified to Playoffs |
| 2 | SUOO (Q) | 38 | 16 | 9 | 13 | 51 | 53 | −2 | 51 | Qualified to Playoffs |
| 3 | Tecomán | 38 | 11 | 12 | 15 | 43 | 47 | −4 | 43 | |
| 4 | Ecatepec | 38 | 10 | 10 | 18 | 41 | 54 | −13 | 35 | Relegation Group |
| 5 | Pioneros Cancún | 38 | 8 | 10 | 20 | 29 | 59 | −30 | 33 | Relegation Group |

Source: RSSSF
(Q) Qualified for the phase indicated

== Results ==
| Home \ Away | CHE | ECA | FEG | JAL | LPD | LEO | NVL | ORI | PAC | PET | PIO | POT | QUE | SUO | TAP | TEC | TEP | UAQ | YUC | ZAC |
|---|---|---|---|---|---|---|---|---|---|---|---|---|---|---|---|---|---|---|---|---|
| Chetumal | — | 1–1 | 0–0 | 1–1 | 1–0 | 2–0 | 0–3 | 0–0 | 6–0 | 1–0 | 4–0 | 0–0 | 1–0 | 1–3 | 0–0 | 5–1 | 4–0 | 1–0 | 1–0 | 2–1 |
| Ecatepec | 0–1 | — | 2–0 | 1–1 | 1–0 | 1–0 | 1–0 | 0–0 | 1–1 | 0–0 | 3–0 | 0–1 | 2–0 | 1–1 | 2–0 | 2–1 | 3–2 | 1–2 | 2–0 | 0–1 |
| FEG | 1–3 | 1–0 | — | 1–2 | 0–1 | 0–0 | 1–2 | 0–2 | 3–1 | 0–0 | 3–1 | 0–2 | 0–0 | 1–1 | 0–0 | 0–2 | 0–0 | 2–1 | 1–3 | 0–0 |
| Jalisco | 2–0 | 3–1 | 1–1 | — | 2–3 | 1–1 | 1–1 | 6–0 | 3–1 | 3–0 | 3–1 | 1–0 | 0–0 | 1–0 | 1–2 | 2–1 | 2–2 | 0–0 | 2–0 | 1–1 |
| La Piedad | 2–0 | 1–0 | 1–0 | 2–0 | — | 1–0 | 1–1 | 2–1 | 2–0 | 1–1 | 1–0 | 0–0 | 1–1 | 1–1 | 1–0 | 1–1 | 4–1 | 0–0 | 2–0 | 2–0 |
| León | 0–1 | 3–1 | 3–2 | 1–1 | 2–5 | — | 2–1 | 2–2 | 2–0 | 2–2 | 6–0 | 4–1 | 3–1 | 3–1 | 3–0 | 3–0 | 1–0 | 2–0 | 2–4 | 1–0 |
| Nuevo León | 2–0 | 6–2 | 1–0 | 3–1 | 4–1 | 0–0 | — | 0–1 | 5–2 | 2–1 | 2–0 | 0–0 | 2–1 | 1–2 | 0–0 | 2–1 | 3–0 | 2–3 | 1–1 | 1–0 |
| Orizaba | 1–0 | 2–0 | 1–0 | 1–0 | 1–2 | 1–1 | 2–1 | — | 1–2 | 4–1 | 0–1 | 4–1 | 2–2 | 1–0 | 1–1 | 0–0 | 2–2 | 1–2 | 2–4 | 1–1 |
| Pachuca | 1–1 | 3–1 | 4–0 | 2–0 | 0–3 | 0–1 | 1–1 | 2–1 | — | 1–4 | 2–0 | 1–0 | 4–2 | 5–2 | 2–0 | 2–1 | 1–0 | 2–0 | 3–4 | 0–0 |
| Petroleros SC | 2–2 | 1–0 | 2–1 | 1–1 | 2–2 | 2–1 | 1–1 | 4–0 | 3–2 | — | 1–0 | 1–1 | 0–1 | 1–1 | 1–1 | 0–0 | 0–0 | 0–2 | 2–2 | 2–2 |
| Pioneros Cancún | 2–0 | 0–0 | 0–4 | 1–3 | 0–0 | 1–1 | 0–0 | 0–0 | 2–0 | 4–2 | — | 2–2 | 3–1 | 0–1 | 1–0 | 0–2 | 3–1 | 1–1 | 1–1 | 0–1 |
| Potros Neza | 0–0 | 4–1 | 3–1 | 2–1 | 1–0 | 0–1 | 2–2 | 1–0 | 3–0 | 3–0 | 2–0 | — | 0–0 | 0–1 | 3–0 | 2–1 | 4–0 | 1–0 | 2–2 | 1–0 |
| Querétaro | 2–0 | 3–3 | 1–1 | 2–1 | 3–1 | 1–0 | 2–1 | 1–1 | 0–2 | 1–1 | 2–1 | 2–3 | — | 3–1 | 2–1 | 1–3 | 0–3 | 1–2 | 3–0 | 3–2 |
| SUOO | 2–0 | 2–1 | 1–2 | 1–4 | 3–2 | 0–0 | 3–0 | 0–3 | 1–1 | 1–1 | 0–1 | 1–0 | 3–0 | — | 3–2 | 2–4 | 2–2 | 2–1 | 0–1 | 2–1 |
| Tapatío | 1–1 | 1–1 | 3–2 | 1–1 | 1–0 | 0–0 | 1–1 | 2–0 | 0–1 | 0–1 | 3–0 | 1–1 | 1–3 | 0–0 | — | 2–3 | 4–2 | 2–2 | 5–0 | 0–1 |
| Tecomán | 0–0 | 2–1 | 3–2 | 1–2 | 2–0 | 1–1 | 0–1 | 0–0 | 2–0 | 0–1 | 0–0 | 1–1 | 1–1 | 1–2 | 0–2 | — | 3–1 | 1–1 | 1–2 | 0–0 |
| Tepic | 2–0 | 2–2 | 1–0 | 1–1 | 0–0 | 1–1 | 0–0 | 2–3 | 2–0 | 0–0 | 2–1 | 2–0 | 2–2 | 0–2 | 3–3 | 1–0 | — | 2–1 | 3–1 | 2–1 |
| UAQ | 0–0 | 4–2 | 3–2 | 3–1 | 0–0 | 1–1 | 2–1 | 1–0 | 4–2 | 2–1 | 2–0 | 5–2 | 4–1 | 0–1 | 1–3 | 1–1 | 4–1 | — | 1–2 | 2–0 |
| Yucatán | 3–2 | 3–1 | 0–0 | 1–1 | 0–0 | 1–1 | 0–0 | 2–1 | 2–2 | 0–1 | 2–2 | 1–2 | 0–2 | 4–1 | 3–2 | 2–0 | 2–2 | 0–1 | — | 3–1 |
| Zacatepec | 3–0 | 1–0 | 1–1 | 3–0 | 1–3 | 1–1 | 1–0 | 4–1 | 3–0 | 1–0 | 1–0 | 3–2 | 2–1 | 3–1 | 5–2 | 1–2 | 3–1 | 3–0 | 4–0 | — |

Source: RSSSF
Legend: Blue = home team win; Yellow = draw; Red = away team win.

== Final stage ==
=== Group 1 ===
| Pos | Team | Pld | W | D | L | GF | GA | GD | Pts | Promotion | POT | LPD | JAL | SUO |
|---|---|---|---|---|---|---|---|---|---|---|---|---|---|---|
| 1 | Potros Neza (Q) | 6 | 3 | 3 | 0 | 10 | 4 | +6 | 11 | Qualified to Final | | 2–2 | 2–0 | 1–0 |
| 2 | La Piedad | 6 | 3 | 3 | 0 | 8 | 4 | +4 | 10 | | 0–0 | | 1–0 | 1–0 |
| 3 | Jalisco | 6 | 1 | 1 | 4 | 6 | 11 | −5 | 4 | | 1–1 | 1–3 | | 1–2 |
| 4 | SUOO | 6 | 1 | 1 | 4 | 6 | 11 | −5 | 4 | | 1–4 | 1–1 | 2–3 | |

Source: RSSSF
Rules for classification: 1st points; 2nd head-to-head points; 3rd head-to-head goal difference; 4th head-to-head goals scored; 5th goal difference; 6th number of goals scored
(Q) Qualified for the phase indicated

=== Group 2 ===
| Pos | Team | Pld | W | D | L | GF | GA | GD | Pts | Promotion | YUC | NVL | UAQ | ZAC |
|---|---|---|---|---|---|---|---|---|---|---|---|---|---|---|
| 1 | Yucatán (Q) | 6 | 4 | 0 | 2 | 14 | 11 | +3 | 12 | Qualified to Final | | 1–3 | 6–1 | 4–0 |
| 2 | Nuevo León | 6 | 4 | 0 | 2 | 9 | 5 | +4 | 11 | | 0–1 | | 2–1 | 0–1 |
| 3 | UAQ | 6 | 2 | 0 | 4 | 12 | 15 | −3 | 6 | | 6–0 | 1–3 | | 0–3 |
| 4 | Zacatepec | 6 | 2 | 0 | 4 | 6 | 10 | −4 | 6 | | 1–2 | 0–1 | 1–3 | |

Source: RSSSF
Rules for classification: 1st points; 2nd head-to-head points; 3rd head-to-head goal difference; 4th head-to-head goals scored; 5th goal difference; 6th number of goals scored
(Q) Qualified for the phase indicated

=== Final ===
| July 8, 1989 | Yucatán | 0–1 | Potros Neza | Mérida |
| | | Report | Guillermo Cantú 5' | Stadium: Estadio Carlos Iturralde |

| July 15, 1989 | Potros Neza | 0–1 | Yucatán | Mexico City |
| | | Report | Alonso Diego 15' | Stadium: Estadio Azulgrana |

| July 18, 1989 | Potros Neza | 3–0 | Yucatán | Guadalajara |
| | Ricardo Camacho 23'; Pascual Ramírez 40'; Luis Miguel Salvador 70' | Report | | Stadium: Estadio Jalisco |

== Relegation Group ==
| Pos | Team | Pld | W | D | L | GF | GA | GD | Pts | Promotion | ECA | TEP | TAP | PIO |
|---|---|---|---|---|---|---|---|---|---|---|---|---|---|---|
| 1 | Ecatepec | 6 | 3 | 2 | 1 | 9 | 3 | +6 | 9 | | | 1–0 | 1–0 | 5–0 |
| 2 | Tepic | 6 | 3 | 1 | 2 | 8 | 6 | +2 | 8 | | 1–0 | | 1–0 | 1–2 |
| 3 | Tapatío (R) | 6 | 1 | 3 | 2 | 6 | 7 | −1 | 5 | Relegated | 1–1 | 1–1 | | 2–1 |
| 4 | Pioneros Cancún (R) | 6 | 1 | 2 | 3 | 8 | 15 | −7 | 5 | Relegated | 1–1 | 2–4 | 2–2 | |

Source: RSSSF
Rules for classification: 1st points; 2nd head-to-head points; 3rd head-to-head goal difference; 4th head-to-head goals scored; 5th goal difference; 6th number of goals scored
(R) Relegated
