= 1986–87 Mexican Segunda División season =

Segunda División de México
- Season: 1986–87
- Champions: UAT (1st Title)
- Promoted: Tapatío; Orizaba; Progreso Cocula
- Relegated: Zacatecas; Pachuca; Nuevo Necaxa
- Matches played: 381
- Goals scored: 1,037 (2.72 per match)
- Top goalscorer: Jaime Ríos (26 goals)

The 1986–87 Segunda División was the 38th season of the Mexican Segunda División. The season started on 18 July 1986 and concluded on 23 June 1987. It was won by UAT.

== Changes ==
- Cobras was promoted to Primera División.
- No team was relegated from the Primera División due to the celebration of the Prode 85 and Mexico 86 tournaments held in a special way as part of the preparation of the national team for the 1986 FIFA World Cup, held in Mexico.
- Tapatío and Orizaba were promoted from Segunda División B.
- Progreso Cocula was promoted from Tercera División.
- Poza Rica, Córdoba and San Mateo Atenco were relegated to Segunda División B.
- Búfalos Curtidores sold its franchise to the Government of Zacatecas, a new team named Mineros de Zacatecas was created. This team was not related with the current team.
- Salamanca sold its franchise to Pioneros de Cancún.
- Atlacomulco returned to Texcoco.

=== During the season ===
- After Week 6, Jaguares de Colima sold its franchise to the University of Colima, the team was renamed Loros UdeC.

== Teams ==
1986–87 season Teams

| Club | City | Stadium |
|---|---|---|
| Chetumal | Chetumal | Estadio José López Portillo |
| Colima; U. de C. | Colima City | Estadio Colima |
| Jalisco | Guadalajara | Estadio Jalisco |
| La Piedad | La Piedad | Estadio Juan N. López |
| Nuevo Necaxa | Tulancingo | Estadio Primero de Mayo |
| Oaxaca | Oaxaca City | Estadio Gral. Manuel Cabrera Carrasquedo |
| Orizaba | Orizaba | Estadio Moctezuma |
| Pachuca | Pachuca | Estadio Revolución Mexicana |
| Pioneros Cancún | Cancún | Estadio Cancún 86 |
| Progreso Cocula | Cocula | Estadio Hércules 77 |
| Santos Laguna | Torreón | Estadio Corona |
| Tapatío | Aguascalientes City | Estadio Alberto Romo Chávez |
| Tecomán | Tecomán | Estadio IAETAC |
| Tepic | Tepic | Estadio Nicolás Álvarez Ortega |
| Texcoco | Texcoco | Estadio Municipal de Texcoco |
| UAQ | Querétaro City | Estadio Corregidora |
| UAT | Ciudad Victoria | Estadio Marte R. Gómez |
| Zacatepec | Zacatepec | Estadio Agustín "Coruco" Díaz |
| Zacatecas | Zacatecas City | Estadio Francisco Villa |

== Group stage ==
=== Group 1 ===
| Pos | Team | Pld | W | D | L | GF | GA | GD | Pts | Qualification or relegation |
|---|---|---|---|---|---|---|---|---|---|---|
| 1 | Texcoco (Q) | 36 | 14 | 10 | 12 | 46 | 48 | −2 | 48 | Qualified to Playoffs |
| 2 | UAT (Q) | 36 | 12 | 13 | 11 | 43 | 42 | +1 | 45 | Qualified to Playoffs |
| 3 | Pachuca | 36 | 13 | 9 | 14 | 56 | 48 | +8 | 41 | Relegation Group |
| 4 | Chetumal | 36 | 12 | 8 | 16 | 47 | 62 | −15 | 39 | Relegation Group |
| 5 | Zacatecas (R) | 36 | 8 | 7 | 21 | 34 | 67 | −33 | 27 | Relegated |

Source: RSSSF
(Q) Qualified for the phase indicated; (R) Relegated

=== Group 2 ===
| Pos | Team | Pld | W | D | L | GF | GA | GD | Pts | Qualification or relegation |
|---|---|---|---|---|---|---|---|---|---|---|
| 1 | Santos Laguna (Q) | 36 | 21 | 7 | 8 | 63 | 34 | +29 | 66 | Qualified to Playoffs |
| 2 | Tecomán (Q) | 36 | 18 | 7 | 11 | 66 | 55 | +11 | 57 | Qualified to Playoffs |
| 3 | Jalisco | 36 | 16 | 9 | 11 | 48 | 33 | +15 | 54 | |
| 4 | Orizaba | 36 | 15 | 9 | 12 | 51 | 57 | −6 | 50 | |
| 5 | Nuevo Necaxa | 36 | 6 | 12 | 18 | 31 | 59 | −28 | 28 | Relegation Group |

Source: RSSSF
(Q) Qualified for the phase indicated

=== Group 3 ===
| Pos | Team | Pld | W | D | L | GF | GA | GD | Pts | Qualification or relegation |
|---|---|---|---|---|---|---|---|---|---|---|
| 1 | Pioneros Cancún (Q) | 36 | 16 | 9 | 11 | 51 | 45 | +6 | 51 | Qualified to Playoffs |
| 2 | Colima/U. de C. (Q) | 36 | 14 | 10 | 12 | 59 | 52 | +7 | 47 | Qualified to Playoffs |
| 3 | Tepic | 36 | 13 | 10 | 13 | 51 | 48 | +3 | 46 | |
| 4 | Tapatío | 36 | 12 | 10 | 14 | 43 | 42 | +1 | 44 | |
| 5 | Progreso Cocula | 36 | 8 | 7 | 21 | 41 | 71 | −30 | 27 | Relegation Group |

Source: RSSSF
(Q) Qualified for the phase indicated

=== Group 4 ===
| Pos | Team | Pld | W | D | L | GF | GA | GD | Pts | Qualification or relegation |
|---|---|---|---|---|---|---|---|---|---|---|
| 1 | Zacatepec (Q) | 36 | 16 | 10 | 10 | 61 | 44 | +17 | 53 | Qualified to Playoffs |
| 2 | UAQ (Q) | 36 | 14 | 9 | 13 | 52 | 44 | +8 | 50 | Qualified to Playoffs |
| 3 | Oaxaca | 36 | 15 | 5 | 16 | 58 | 53 | +5 | 46 | |
| 4 | La Piedad | 36 | 12 | 13 | 11 | 51 | 48 | +3 | 44 | |

Source: RSSSF
(Q) Qualified for the phase indicated

== Results ==
| Home \ Away | CHE | CUC | JAL | LPD | NEC | OAX | ORI | PAC | PIO | PRO | SAN | TAP | TEC | TEP | TEX | UAQ | UAT | ZAC | ZAS |
|---|---|---|---|---|---|---|---|---|---|---|---|---|---|---|---|---|---|---|---|
| Chetumal | — | 3–0 | 0–3 | 0–1 | 2–2 | 4–1 | 1–1 | 2–1 | 1–0 | 6–2 | 2–1 | 3–3 | 1–3 | 2–1 | 4–4 | 0–0 | 1–0 | 3–0 | 3–0 |
| Colima-U. de C. | 4–1 | — | 1–0 | 5–1 | 1–0 | 2–1 | 1–1 | 0–0 | 1–2 | 4–0 | 1–2 | 0–1 | 1–2 | 3–2 | 4–0 | 2–3 | 5–3 | 2–2 | 2–1 |
| Jalisco | 2–0 | 0–1 | — | 1–1 | 3–0 | 1–0 | 1–1 | 3–1 | 2–2 | 1–0 | 2–3 | 2–1 | 2–0 | 1–3 | 3–1 | 0–0 | 3–1 | 1–1 | 3–0 |
| La Piedad | 0–1 | 2–1 | 0–1 | — | 3–1 | 1–2 | 2–2 | 1–1 | 3–3 | 6–1 | 1–0 | 2–3 | 2–2 | 2–1 | 2–0 | 2–1 | 0–0 | 2–1 | 3–0 |
| Nuevo Necaxa | 2–1 | 1–1 | 0–0 | 1–1 | — | 4–2 | 0–1 | 0–3 | 0–1 | 4–1 | 0–0 | 0–0 | 0–2 | 2–2 | 1–1 | 2–0 | 1–0 | 2–0 | 1–4 |
| Oaxaca | 0–0 | 0–1 | 4–0 | 1–1 | 4–0 | — | 1–0 | 2–2 | 6–1 | 4–0 | 1–1 | 2–2 | 4–1 | 3–0 | 0–1 | 3–0 | 1–0 | 2–1 | 3–0 |
| Orizaba | 4–1 | 0–1 | 0–3 | 2–1 | 2–0 | 3–0 | — | 2–1 | 2–0 | 3–0 | 1–2 | 3–0 | 3–2 | 2–1 | 1–1 | 2–2 | 2–3 | 1–1 | 1–1 |
| Pachuca | 0–0 | 3–0 | 2–1 | 1–0 | 2–2 | 5–1 | 1–2 | — | 2–2 | 4–3 | 2–1 | 4–0 | 4–1 | 5–0 | 1–0 | 2–1 | 1–2 | 2–2 | 3–2 |
| Pioneros Cancún | 3–0 | 0–1 | 1–0 | 1–1 | 2–0 | 4–1 | 0–1 | 3–0 | — | 1–0 | 0–3 | 1–0 | 1–1 | 3–2 | 1–0 | 2–1 | 4–0 | 3–1 | 4–1 |
| Progreso Cocula | 4–0 | 2–2 | 2–1 | 2–1 | 5–0 | 1–2 | 2–1 | 1–0 | 0–0 | — | 1–1 | 1–2 | 1–2 | 1–1 | 1–1 | 1–3 | 0–1 | 2–0 | 2–3 |
| Santos Laguna | 1–0 | 2–0 | 0–3 | 1–2 | 3–1 | 2–0 | 6–1 | 0–0 | 3–1 | 2–0 | — | 1–0 | 2–1 | 1–0 | 3–1 | 2–0 | 1–1 | 2–0 | 6–0 |
| Tapatío | 4–1 | 1–1 | 1–1 | 3–1 | 0–0 | 2–0 | 3–0 | 1–1 | 2–0 | 1–0 | 0–1 | — | 2–3 | 0–1 | 0–1 | 3–0 | 0–0 | 1–1 | 2–1 |
| Tecomán | 3–0 | 1–1 | 0–2 | 3–1 | 3–3 | 1–0 | 5–1 | 3–1 | 2–1 | 4–0 | 1–0 | 2–0 | — | 4–2 | 0–2 | 1–1 | 4–2 | 1–0 | 3–3 |
| Tepic | 3–0 | 2–2 | 1–1 | 2–0 | 2–1 | 2–1 | 0–1 | 1–0 | 3–0 | 0–0 | 1–2 | 2–0 | 2–0 | — | 4–0 | 0–1 | 1–1 | 1–1 | 2–0 |
| Texcoco | 1–1 | 2–2 | 1–0 | 1–1 | 2–0 | 0–1 | 2–3 | 1–0 | 1–1 | 5–2 | 3–1 | 1–0 | 3–1 | 1–1 | — | 2–0 | 1–0 | 2–2 | 2–0 |
| UAQ | 1–2 | 5–3 | 3–0 | 0–1 | 0–0 | 4–0 | 4–0 | 2–0 | 1–1 | 3–1 | 2–2 | 0–0 | 1–0 | 4–1 | 3–1 | — | 2–0 | 0–2 | 2–0 |
| UAT | 3–1 | 1–1 | 0–0 | 2–2 | 1–0 | 1–0 | 3–0 | 3–1 | 0–0 | 0–0 | 1–2 | 1–0 | 0–0 | 1–1 | 3–0 | 3–0 | — | 3–2 | 1–1 |
| Zacatepec | 3–0 | 1–0 | 0–1 | 1–1 | 2–0 | 5–2 | 4–0 | 2–0 | 3–0 | 2–1 | 3–2 | 4–3 | 4–1 | 1–1 | 1–0 | 1–1 | 3–1 | — | 3–0 |
| Zacatecas | 1–0 | 4–2 | 1–0 | 0–0 | 2–0 | 0–3 | 1–1 | 1–0 | 0–2 | 0–1 | 1–1 | 0–2 | 2–3 | 1–2 | 0–1 | 2–1 | 1–1 | 0–1 | — |

Source: RSSSF
Legend: Blue = home team win; Yellow = draw; Red = away team win.

== Final stage ==
=== Group 1 ===
| Pos | Team | Pld | W | D | L | GF | GA | GD | Pts | Promotion | UAQ | PIO | TEC | TEX |
|---|---|---|---|---|---|---|---|---|---|---|---|---|---|---|
| 1 | UAQ (Q) | 6 | 3 | 2 | 1 | 8 | 5 | +3 | 10 | Qualified to Final | | 2–0 | 3–1 | 1–0 |
| 2 | Pioneros Cancún | 6 | 3 | 1 | 2 | 8 | 8 | 0 | 8 | | 1–1 | | 2–1 | 2–1 |
| 3 | Tecomán | 6 | 2 | 1 | 3 | 7 | 8 | −1 | 6 | | 2–0 | 2–1 | | 1–1 |
| 4 | Texcoco | 6 | 1 | 2 | 3 | 5 | 7 | −2 | 4 | | 1–1 | 1–2 | 1–0 | |

Source: RSSSF
Rules for classification: 1st points; 2nd head-to-head points; 3rd head-to-head goal difference; 4th head-to-head goals scored; 5th goal difference; 6th number of goals scored
(Q) Qualified for the phase indicated

=== Group 2 ===
| Pos | Team | Pld | W | D | L | GF | GA | GD | Pts | Promotion | UAT | SAN | ZAC | UDC |
|---|---|---|---|---|---|---|---|---|---|---|---|---|---|---|
| 1 | UAT (Q) | 6 | 4 | 0 | 2 | 8 | 3 | +5 | 11 | Qualified to Final | | 2–0 | 2–0 | 1–0 |
| 2 | Santos Laguna | 6 | 2 | 2 | 2 | 9 | 10 | −1 | 7 | | 2–1 | | 1–1 | 2–0 |
| 3 | Zacatepec | 6 | 2 | 1 | 3 | 6 | 7 | −1 | 6 | | 1–0 | 3–1 | | 0–1 |
| 4 | U. de C. | 6 | 2 | 1 | 3 | 6 | 9 | −3 | 6 | | 0–2 | 3–3 | 2–1 | |

Source: RSSSF
Rules for classification: 1st points; 2nd head-to-head points; 3rd head-to-head goal difference; 4th head-to-head goals scored; 5th goal difference; 6th number of goals scored
(Q) Qualified for the phase indicated

=== Final ===
| May 10, 1987 | UAT | 0–0 | UAQ | Ciudad Victoria |
| | | Report | | Stadium: Estadio Marte R. Gómez |

| June 20, 1987 | UAQ | 1–1 | UAT | Querétaro City |
| | Laguna 83' | Report | Serratos 79' | Stadium: Estadio Corregidora |

| June 23, 1987 | UAQ | 0–0 (1–1 agg.) (2–4 p) | UAT | Mexico City |
| | | Report | | Stadium: Estadio Azteca |

== Relegation Group ==
| Pos | Team | Pld | W | D | L | GF | GA | GD | Pts | Promotion | CHE | PRO | PAC | NEC |
|---|---|---|---|---|---|---|---|---|---|---|---|---|---|---|
| 1 | Chetumal | 6 | 3 | 1 | 2 | 9 | 6 | +3 | 9 | | | 4–0 | 1–0 | 2–0 |
| 2 | Progreso Cocula | 6 | 3 | 1 | 2 | 6 | 8 | −2 | 8 | | 1–0 | | 2–2 | 1–0 |
| 3 | Pachuca (R) | 6 | 1 | 3 | 2 | 7 | 6 | +1 | 6 | Relegated | 3–0 | 1–2 | | 0–0 |
| 4 | Nuevo Necaxa (R) | 6 | 1 | 3 | 2 | 4 | 6 | −2 | 5 | Relegated | 2–2 | 1–0 | 1–1 | |

Source: RSSSF
Rules for classification: 1st points; 2nd head-to-head points; 3rd head-to-head goal difference; 4th head-to-head goals scored; 5th goal difference; 6th number of goals scored
(R) Relegated
