= 1994–95 Mexican Segunda División season =

Segunda División de México
- Season: 1994–95
- Champions: Cruz Azul Hidalgo (1st Title)
- Relegated: Jaguares Tabasco; Yautepec

The 1994–95 Segunda División was the 46th season of the Mexican Segunda División and the first season as the third level of the mexican football leagues system. The season started on 3 September 1994 and concluded on 24 June 1995. It was won by Cruz Azul Hidalgo.

== Teams ==
1994–95 season Teams

Club	City	Stadium
Bachilleres	Guadalajara	Estadio Tecnológico de la U. de G.
Cancún	Cancún	Estadio Cancún 86
Cruz Azul Hidalgo	Ciudad Cooperativa Cruz Azul	Estadio 10 de Diciembre
Cruz Azul Oaxaca	Oaxaca City	Estadio Benito Juárez
Cuautla	Cuautla	Estadio Isidro Gil Tapia
Delfines de Xalapa	Xalapa	Estadio Antonio M. Quirasco
Jaguares de Tabasco	Villahermosa	Estadio Olímpico de Villahermosa
Oaxaca	Oaxaca City	Estadio Benito Juárez
Orizaba	Orizaba	Estadio Socum
Puerto Vallarta	Puerto Vallarta	Estadio Municipal Agustín Flores
Querétaro	Querétaro City	Estadio Corregidora
Real Hidalgo	Pachuca	Estadio Revolución Mexicana
Tapatío	Guadalajara	Estadio Anacleto Macías
Tecomán	Tecomán	Estadio IAETAC
Tigrillos UANL	San Nicolás de los Garza	Estadio Universitario
UPAEP	Puebla City	Cuauhtémoc/IMSS La Trinidad
Yautepec	Yautepec	Estadio Centro Vacacional IMSS

== Group stage ==
=== Group 1 ===
Pos	Team	Pld	W	D	L	GF	GA	GD	Pts	Qualification or relegation
1	Cruz Azul Hidalgo	32	14	12	6	62	30	+32	51	Promotion playoff
2	Cancún	32	15	10	7	44	27	+17	50	Promotion playoff
3	Querétaro	32	13	10	9	44	42	+2	46	Repechage
4	Tigrillos UANL	32	11	3	18	43	62	−19	30	
5	UPAEP	32	7	6	19	26	53	−27	24	

Source: RSSSF

=== Group 2 ===
Pos	Team	Pld	W	D	L	GF	GA	GD	Pts	Qualification or relegation
1	Bachilleres	32	15	14	3	49	35	+14	56	Promotion final
2	Cuautla	32	14	8	10	38	33	+5	44	Promotion playoff
3	Puerto Vallarta	32	12	10	10	41	36	+5	42	
4	Jaguares de Tabasco	32	6	8	18	31	65	−34	24	Relegated

Source: RSSSF

=== Group 3 ===
Pos	Team	Pld	W	D	L	GF	GA	GD	Pts	Qualification or relegation
1	Real Hidalgo	32	12	11	9	51	41	+10	44	Promotion playoff
2	Tecomán	32	12	9	11	38	34	+4	41	Repechage
3	Orizaba	32	13	7	12	38	40	−2	41	
4	Cruz Azul Oaxaca	32	7	9	16	35	56	−21	28	

Source: RSSSF

=== Group 4 ===
Pos	Team	Pld	W	D	L	GF	GA	GD	Pts	Qualification or relegation
1	Tapatío	32	14	12	6	62	35	+27	53	Promotion playoff
2	Delfines de Xalapa	32	13	11	8	46	32	+14	47	Promotion playoff
3	Oaxaca	32	10	7	15	34	36	−2	36	
4	Yautepec	32	3	15	14	24	49	−25	23	Relegated

Source: RSSSF

== Results ==
Home \ Away	BAC	CAN	CRH	CRO	CUA	DEL	JAG	OAX	ORI	PVR	QUE	HID	TAP	TEC	TIG	UPP	YAU
Bachilleres	—	1–1	2–2	3–1	1–1	0–0	3–1	3–1	3–1	3–2	1–2	1–0	1–1	1–1	2–0	2–1	3–0
Cancún	0–1	—	2–1	1–0	0–0	0–0	2–1	1–1	1–0	0–1	3–0	1–1	3–0	1–0	0–1	4–1	3–0
Cruz Azul Hidalgo	0–0	2–3	—	1–0	2–2	0–0	6–1	5–0	3–1	1–1	5–1	3–0	2–0	3–0	2–1	2–1	1–1
Cruz Azul Oaxaca	2–3	1–2	0–5	—	2–1	2–0	0–3	0–0	1–2	1–2	3–3	0–0	1–1	2–1	1–1	0–0	2–2
Cuautla	0–1	3–0	1–1	1–3	—	2–1	2–0	2–1	3–1	1–0	1–1	1–0	0–1	3–0	3–1	1–0	1–0
Delfines Xalapa	2–2	2–2	1–1	1–0	1–0	—	2–0	3–1	0–0	1–0	0–1	4–2	2–2	0–1	4–2	1–1	4–1
Jaguares Tabasco	0–1	0–0	3–2	2–0	1–2	1–5	—	1–3	1–1	2–0	1–1	0–1	1–1	0–0	2–1	0–1	0–0
Oaxaca	2–2	0–0	1–1	5–0	0–1	0–2	2–0	—	4–1	3–1	0–1	1–2	0–1	0–1	2–0	0–0	1–0
Orizaba	0–0	1–0	0–2	1–2	3–0	1–2	0–0	1–0	—	2–0	1–0	4–2	2–0	3–2	5–2	1–0	0–0
Puerto Vallarta	3–0	1–1	1–0	3–1	2–1	0–0	2–2	0–1	0–1	—	1–1	3–3	1–1	2–1	2–4	3–0	1–0
Querétaro	3–3	2–0	0–3	1–1	0–1	3–1	2–0	1–0	2–0	2–0	—	1–2	1–1	1–0	4–2	2–0	2–1
Real Hidalgo	1–1	3–4	1–1	0–1	1–0	1–0	4–1	3–1	3–0	2–2	2–2	—	2–2	3–0	2–0	2–2	1–0
Tapatío	5–0	0–1	1–1	4–1	4–0	0–3	6–2	0–0	2–2	1–1	3–1	2–1	—	2–0	5–0	3–1	2–0
Tecomán	1–1	0–1	2–1	3–2	0–0	1–0	8–1	1–0	2–0	0–0	3–1	1–1	2–2	—	2–0	2–0	0–0
Tigrillos UANL	1–2	1–6	0–2	3–2	1–0	3–0	2–1	2–1	1–2	0–1	1–1	1–0	3–1	0–1	—	1–0	6–2
UPAEP	0–2	1–1	3–1	0–2	1–1	1–3	1–2	0–2	2–1	0–2	2–1	0–4	0–1	3–2	2–0	—	0–3
Yautepec	0–0	1–0	0–0	1–1	3–3	1–1	4–1	0–1	0–0	0–3	0–0	1–1	0–7	0–0	2–2	1–2	—

Source: RSSSF
Legend: Blue = home team win; Yellow = draw; Red = away team win.

== Repechage ==
Team 1	Agg.	Team 2	1st leg	2nd leg
Tecomán	2–0	Querétaro	0–0	2–0

== Final stage ==
Quarter-finals
3	Cruz Azul Hidalgo (p.)	0	2	2 (4)
7	Cuautla	1	1	2 (3)
1	Bachilleres	1	1	2
8	Tecomán	3	1	4
4	Cancún	0	0	0
5	Delfines de Xalapa	0	2	2
2	Tapatío	1	0	1
6	Real Hidalgo	2	1	3

Semi-finals
3	Cruz Azul Hidalgo	0	3	3
8	Tecomán	0	1	1
5	Delfines de Xalapa	2	1	3
6	Real Hidalgo	2	2	4

Final
3	Cruz Azul Hidalgo	1	5	6
6	Real Hidalgo	0	1	1

== Promotion final ==
To determine the winning team of the promotion to Primera División 'A', a playoff was held between Bachilleres, the best team of the regular season, and Cruz Azul Hidalgo, winner of the season final play-offs. Cruz Azul Hidalgo won the series and with it was promoted to the second level of Mexican football.

Team 1	Agg.	Team 2	1st leg	2nd leg
Bachilleres	0–1	Cruz Azul Hidalgo	0–1	0–0

=== First leg ===
18 June 1995	Cruz Azul Hidalgo	1–1	Bachilleres	Ciudad Cooperativa Cruz Azul
	75'	Report	88'	Stadium: Estadio 10 de Diciembre

=== Second leg ===
24 June 1995	Bachilleres	1–3 (1–4 agg.)	Cruz Azul Hidalgo	Guadalajara
	55'	Report	49' 79' 90+4'	Stadium: Estadio Jalisco; Attendance: 15,000; Referee: Jorge Eduardo Gasso

1994–95 winners

1st title
