= Tijuana Cimarrones =

Mexican independent baseball franchise

- Logo

Information
- League: Golden Baseball League (2010-2011)
- Location: Tijuana, Baja California
- Ballpark: Estadio Nacional de Tijuana
- Founded: 2005
- Folded: 2011
- League championships: 0
- Former name: Tijuana Cimarrones (2010-2011); Tijuana Potros (2009); Potros de Tijuana (2005–08)
- Former league(s): Liga Mexicana de Béisbol (Triple A, 2005–08)
- Colors: Dark Green, Gold, Black
- Ownership: Golden Baseball League
- Manager: Enrique Brito
- Website: www.cimarronesdetijuana.com

The Tijuana Cimarrones were a professional independent baseball franchise based in Tijuana, Baja California, Mexico. They were originally a minor league baseball team in Liga Mexicana de Béisbol (Mexican Baseball League), but joined the Golden Baseball League as an expansion team in 2009. The team started play at Estadio Nacional de Tijuana (Tijuana National Stadium) in 2010, which was the last year of play for the Golden Baseball League. In 2011, the Golden League and two others consolidated to form the North American League, but the Cimarrones did not participate in that league. The Tijuana Embajadores was a proposed team from Tijuana that had at one time been scheduled to participate in the North American League (NAL), but that team also failed to start the season with the NAL.

== History ==
=== Liga Mexicana de Beisbol ===
The team was originally known as the Tijuana Potros. Los Potros de Tijuana (Spanish for Tijuana Colts) originally played in the Liga Mexicana de Béisbol (Mexican Baseball League). They played their home games at Estadio Nacional de Tijuana (Tijuana National Stadium) from 2005 to 2008.

The franchise started as a Double-A team that played until 1991 when they folded. This team actually was a descendant of the Triple-A Los Toros de Tijuana (Tijuana Toros) before the Mexican League reportedly to have stripped the Toros owner of his franchise and gave it to new owners who renamed that team the Tijuana Potros after the original Double-A team that folded in 1991. The Toros ownership kept the team name, logo, uniforms and history as a result of the alleged political wrangling that went on in that league.

GBL Logo

=== Golden Baseball League ===
The Golden Baseball League had originally planned on bringing the Tijuana Toros in as one of the charter teams, but that plan was dropped as a stadium agreement could not be reached between the Toros and Estadio Nacional de Tijuana. They had been playing in the Mexican League since 2005, but on December 15, 2008, the GBL signed a letter of intent to bring an expansion franchise to Tijuana after the 2008 Mexican League franchise was disbanded and relocated to Reynosa, Tamaulipas.

On January 13, 2009, the league officially welcome the Potros. They would join fellow expansion teams, the Tucson Toros and Victoria Seals.

On May 7, 2009, the GBL announced the postponement of the Potros' inaugural season until 2010 due to Mexico's swine flu outbreak and the subsequent health risk and precautionary measures that resulted from it.

Before the season was cancelled, the 2009 Potros had three Mexican Baseball Hall of Fame members on the coaching staff including Manager Mario Mendoza, Pitching Coach José Peña, and Bench Coach Jorge Fitch.

=== Name change ===
There were rumors floating around that the team is now being called the "Tijuana Cimarrones". These rumors were confirmed with the launching of the team's website, which was subsequently taken down. A "cimarron" may be many things - a wild or un-tamed animal; a rough or uncouth individual; a runaway slave (in Cuba & Latin America - see "El Ultimo Cimarron" by Miguel Barnet); or a fruit-topped snow cone (in Sonora, MX). In the Old West (late 19th century western US) the Spanish word "cimarron" was used to describe a wild horse, wild cowboy-drifter, or a renegade Indian (i.e. Native American). Since the team is probably not named for snow cones or runaway slaves - and was formerly known as Los Potros (The Colts) - the most suitable translation would seem to be "The Wild Horses" or "The Wild Bunch."

Due to not being able to maintain financial obligations with the stadium, the league took over the team and they played their remaining home games at the Ray Kroc Baseball Complex in Yuma, Arizona. After the season ended, the team became inactive.

== See also ==
- Potros de Tijuana (Mexican League team)
- Toros de Tijuana (Mexican League team)
