= Gastón Obledo =

Mexican footballer and manager (born 1966)

Personal information
- Full name: Gastón Ángel Obledo Loo
- Date of birth: 6 February 1966 (age 60)
- Place of birth: San Luis Potosí City, Mexico
- Height: 1.72 m (5 ft 7 1/2 in)
- Position: Midfielder

Team information
- Current team: La Piedad (Head coach)

Senior career*
Years	Team	Apps	(Gls)
1986–1989	Jalisco		(19)
1989–1992	Atlas	90	(20)
1992–1993	UAT	33	(7)
1993–1997	Atlante	131	(22)
1997–1998	Atlas	25	(3)
1998–2002	Monterrey	123	(7)

Managerial career
- 2003–2004: Cruz Azul Oaxaca (Assistant)
- 2004–2005: Atlante (Assistant)
- 2006: León (Assistant)
- 2006–2007: Real Colima
- 2008–2009: Atlas (Assistant)
- 2009: Guerreros de Hermosillo
- 2010–2011: UdeC
- 2012–2013: Jaguares de Chiapas (Assistant)
- 2013: Atlas (Assistant)
- 2014: Atlante
- 2015: Atlante (Assistant)
- 2015–2016: Correcaminos UAT (Assistant)
- 2017–2019: Monarcas Morelia Premier
- 2019: Monarcas Morelia (Interim)
- 2019–2020: Atlético Reynosa
- 2021–2022: Atlante (Assistant)
- 2022–2024: Tampico Madero/Jaiba Brava
- 2025: Durango
- 2026: Racing de Veracruz
- 2026–: La Piedad
- * Club domestic league appearances and goals

Gastón Ángel Obledo Loo (Note: In this Spanish name, the first or paternal surname is Obledo and the second or maternal family name is Loo.) (born 6 February 1966) is a Mexican football manager and former player.
