= Club Jaiba Brava =

Mexican football club

Jaiba Brava
- Full name: Club Jaiba Brava
- Nicknames: La Jaiba Brava (The Brave Crab); Los Jaibos (The Blue Crabs)
- Short name: JAI, CJB
- Founded: September 5, 1982; 44 years ago (as Deportivo Social Tampico Madero)
- Ground: Estadio Tamaulipas
- Capacity: 19,668
- Owner: Promotora Deportiva Tampico FC S.A. de C.V.
- Chairman: Gerardo Nader
- Manager: Miguel Ángel Martínez
- League: Liga de Expansión MX
- Apertura 2026: Regular phase: 14th of 16; Final phase: Not qualified
- Website: cdstampicomadero.com
Home colours	Away colours

Club Jaiba Brava is a professional football club based in Tampico and Ciudad Madero, Tamaulipas. The club competes in Liga de Expansión MX, the second level of Mexican football, and plays its home matches at Estadio Tamaulipas. Founded in 1982 as Deportivo Social Tampico Madero, the club was renamed as TM Gallos Blancos in 1994, TM Fútbol Club in 2016, Club Deportivo y Social Tampico Madero in 2022, and finally the club adopted its current name in 2024.

== History ==
The club was founded on September 5, 1982 when the city of Tampico, Tamaulipas decided to buy out a struggling club made up from players from the Atletas Campesinos team from the city of Querétaro, Querétaro and some from the precursor club, C.D. Tampico A.C, that had been relegated and dissolved. That year the club struggled once again, finishing 14th in the league. The following year, the club would earn 9th place.

The 1985–86 season was split into two short tournaments (Prode 85 and Mexico 86). In the Prode 85 the club finished 1st in group 1 and qualified to the playoff series. In the quarterfinals the club defeated Cruz Azul 4–2. In semifinals the club defeated Puebla 5–4. In the finals the club went up against América, managing to beat América 4–1 in the first match and losing in the second 4-0 to a loss in aggregate of 5-1. In the Mexico 86 the club would once again reach the finals, this time after defeating Monarcas Morelia in quarterfinals and América in semifinals. The club would go up against Monterrey in the finals winning the first match 2–1 but once again losing the second match 2–0 and finishing runner up. The club would qualify to the playoffs again in the 1988–89 tournament. This time a short tournament play-off round was played with clubs Cruz Azul, Pumas de la UNAM and Atlante. The club would finish 1 point behind Cruz Azul, who would go on to final against América. The following year the club finished 19th overall. The club was bought out by the Querétaro franchise and moved to the city of Querétaro, Querétaro.

In 1991, Antonio Pélaez Pier bought the Atlético Potosino franchise and relocated it to Tampico, Tamaulipas to return the team to competitions. The team was registered in the Segunda División de México. In 1994, the team was promoted to the Primera División de México after defeating Irapuato in the championship final.

In the 1994–95 season the team played in the Primera División, however, in the middle of the season the club was moved to Querétaro and renamed TM Gallos Blancos, due to problems between the team owner and the oil workers' union, the stadium owners. At the end of the 1994–95 season TM Gallos Blancos was relegated to Primera División 'A', subsequently the owner moved the team to Hermosillo, Sonora and renamed it Gallos Blancos de Hermosillo.

After 1995, the team came and went on several occasions, playing mainly in the Primera División 'A' de México. Between 1995 and 1998 the team was a reserves team of Puebla. In 2001, Águilas de Tamaulipas was promoted from the Segunda División and took the name of Tampico Madero, however, the team only played one year until it was moved to La Piedad, Michoacán and renamed La Piedad due to a lack of support from local businessmen.

In 2005, the team returned to compete in the Primera División 'A', now as part of the sports structure of Atlante, Tampico Madero served as the team's reserves for a few years and later as an independent club. However, in 2009 it was dissolved due to the reform of the league that established requirements that the club had not met. The club was able to continue playing in the third level of Mexican football because it kept its reserves squad that took part in that league and became the main team.

In 2010, the team merged with Universidad del Fútbol, and became part of the sports structure of Pachuca, for which Tampico Madero received youth players from. In the Torneo Independencia 2010, the team was runner-up in the league after being defeated by Celaya. In 2014, the club became independent from Pachuca.

In 2015, the Grupo Tecamachalco took charge of the club with Javier San Román as president. In the Clausura 2016 tournament the team won the championship of its division and played in the playoff against Potros UAEM, where the club was defeated.

In the summer of 2016, Grupo Tecamachalco signed an agreement with Grupo Orlegi. With this agreement Tampico Madero obtained a franchise in the Liga de Ascenso de México, the second category of Mexican football, where the team was officially renamed as TM Fútbol Club. In 2018, Grupo Tecamachalco abandoned the operation of the club due to the possible elimination of the right of promotion for the clubs of the Ascenso MX to the Liga MX. After this event, Tampico Madero continued in the league, but became a training team for Santos Laguna and Atlas, the Orlegi clubs that participate in the Primera División de México.

In the spring of 2020, the Ascenso MX was in a financial crisis from the COVID-19 pandemic and the loss of television income and fans suffered by the clubs, so the league became a youth football development tournament and promotion to the Liga MX was abolished in exchange for member clubs receiving financial aid from teams in the highest category of Mexican football. The league was renamed as Liga de Expansión MX.

In December 2020, Tampico Madero became the first Liga de Expansión champion after defeating Atlante in the final. In May 2021, the team lost the champions trophy against Tepatitlán. In December 2021, the team was runner-up in the league after falling to Atlante in a repeat of the 2020 final.

At the end of 2021, several problems began to arise between Grupo Orlegi, the owner of the club, and the oil workers' union due to the worse state of the Estadio Tamaulipas, since both parties accused each other of not taking charge of the maintenance of the property. This terminated in the stadium being closed by the municipal government due to its poor conditions.

On April 20, 2022, Grupo Orlegi announced the end of the TM Fútbol Club franchise, which meant a new demise for the club. The next day the purchase of the franchise was announced by businessman Arturo Lomelí, the owner of Mazorqueros Fútbol Club, who decided to move the club to La Paz, Baja California Sur and rename it Club Atlético La Paz.

After the end of the TM Fútbol Club franchise, local businessmen began efforts to bring a new team to the city. On June 22, 2022, the new project was officially presented, the team was renamed Club Deportivo y Social Tampico Madero and played in the Segunda División de México between 2022 and 2024. The new team emerged after acquiring the Atlético Reynosa franchise, which had been on hiatus since 2020. Enrique Badillo was appointed as the president of the club and Gastón Obledo as manager. In the first tournament for the new franchise, Tampico Madero dominated their competition and became the favorites to win the championship, however they were defeated in the final by Tuzos UAZ with an aggregate score of 2–3.

In the Clausura tournament the team once again dominated the competition, so it advanced to the final phase. After eliminating Gavilanes de Matamoros and Cafetaleros de Chiapas, Tampico Madero reached the final against Inter Playa del Carmen, in the two games the teams tied at two goals, with an aggregate score of 4-4, for which a penalty shoot-out was necessary. Finally, Tampico Madero won the series 4-2 and won the championship.

Tampico Madero won the 2022–23 season Champions Trophy against Tuzos UAZ, in a series of matches that were impacted by violent incidents in the first leg held in the city of Zacatecas, Zacatecas. The series ended with a 1–0 aggregate. Although the team had won its right to promote to the Liga de Expansión through sports merits, this was denied by the FMF, considering that the team did not meet the requirements to participate in that league, so Tampico Madero should have remained in the Liga Premier.

In the 2023–24 season, Tampico Madero revalidated its status as champion of the Liga Premier – Serie A by defeating Los Cabos United in the final in the final with an aggregate score of 4–1, although the team won the right to be examined for promotion to the Liga de Expansión, the board decided to purchase a franchise of a participating team in the higher category, pending approval by the League's regulatory authorities. On July 12, 2024, the assembly of Liga de Expansión owners approved the entry of Tampico Madero as a guest team of the Liga Premier, so the purchase of a franchise was not necessary to have the promotion. After its promotion to the category, the team was officially renamed Club Jaiba Brava due to regulatory issues regarding the team name.

In the summer of 2025, the club attempted to become a full member of Liga de Expansión MX by purchasing Cimarrones de Sonora's franchise. However, the initial sale was rejected by the owners of the other teams in the league. Finally, in April 2026, a second attempt was made and approved by the league members, making Jaiba Brava an official team in the league starting with the 2026–27 season.

== Year by year statistics ==
Year	Position	Games played	Won	Tied	Lost	Goals Scored	Goals Against	Points	Postseason place
1982–83	G2.5	38	12	9	17	49	61	33	Didn't qualify
1983–84	G3.3	38	16	9	13	64	61	41	Didn't qualify
1984–85	G2.3	38	17	8	13	65	58	42	Didn't qualify
Prode 85	G1.1	8	5	0	3	21	12	10	Finals
Mexico 86	G2.2	18	11	2	5	45	25	24	Finals
1986–87	G2.3	40	16	9	15	60	59	41	Didn't qualify
1987–88	G1.4	38	7	18	13	50	62	38	Didn't qualify
1988–89	G3.1	38	20	7	11	87	56	53	Quarter-finals
1989–90	G3.5	38	9	11	18	29	48	29	Didn't qualify

After this season Querétaro bought the Tampico - Madero franchise. Also after this season the team with the worst point percentage in the last three seasons will be relegated.

== Past kits ==
First kit evolution

1985 Away	1986 Home	1989 Home	Clausura 2015 Home	Clausura 2015 Away

=== Past kits part 2 ===
First kit evolution

Apertura 2015 Home	Apertura 2015 Away	2016–17 Home	2016–17 Away	2017–18 Home	2017–18 Away

== Stadium ==
CDS Tampico Madero play their home matches at the Estadio Tamaulipas in Tampico & Ciudad Madero, Tamaulipas. The stadium capacity is 19,369 people. Its owned by STPRM, and its surface is covered by natural grass. The stadium was opened in 1966.

== Personnel ==
=== Management ===
Position	Staff
Chairman	(Mexico) Gerardo Nader
Director of football	(Mexico) Pedro Beltrán

Source: Liga MX

=== Coaching staff ===
Position	Staff
Manager	(Argentina) Miguel Ángel Martínez
Assistant managers	(Mexico) Jesús Chávez (Mexico) Jorge García (Mexico) Luis Jiménez
Goalkeeping coach	(Mexico) José Torruco
Physiotherapist	(Mexico) Víctor Fernández
Team doctor	(Mexico) Juan Hermosillo

== Players ==
=== First-team squad ===
As of 15 September 2026

Note: Flags indicate national team as defined under FIFA eligibility rules; some limited exceptions apply. Players may hold more than one non-FIFA nationality.

No.	Pos.	Nation	Player
1	GK	MEX	Joel García
2	DF	MEX	Luciano Bocco
3	DF	MEX	Ricardo Peña
4	DF	MEX	Alberto Ríos
5	MF	MEX	Iván Ochoa
6	DF	MEX	José López González
7	MF	MEX	Deivoon Magaña
8	MF	MEX	Ronaldo González
9	FW	MEX	Jesús Ocejo (on loan from Santos Laguna)
10	MF	MEX	Edson Torres
11	MF	URU	Cristian Cruz
13	GK	MEX	Gerardo Ruiz
14	MF	MEX	Néstor Corona

No.	Pos.	Nation	Player
15	FW	MEX	Marioni Ham
16	FW	MEX	Jonathan Martínez
17	DF	MEX	Ian Ramírez (on loan from Atlético San Luis)
18	MF	MEX	Aldo Serna
19	FW	MEX	Daniel López
20	DF	MEX	Jonathan Tovar
21	FW	MEX	Francisco López
22	DF	MEX	Néstor Arriaga
23	GK	MEX	Roberto Elicerio (on loan from Atlético San Luis)
25	DF	MEX	Axl Padilla
26	DF	MEX	Óscar Manzanarez
27	FW	MEX	Eduardo Escalante (on loan from Monterrey)
33	MF	MEX	Sebastián Martínez (on loan from Atlético San Luis)

== Reserves ==
=== Jaiba Brava TDP ===
Reserve team that plays in the Liga TDP, the fourth level of Mexican football.

== Honours ==
Domestic
Type	Competition	Titles	Seasons	Runners-up
Top level FMF	Primera División	0	—	Prode–1985, Mex–1986
Lower levels FMF	Liga de Expansión MX	2	Guard–2020, Ape–2025	Ape–2021, Cla–2025, Cla–2026
Lower levels FMF	Campeón de Campeones Liga de Expansión MX	0	—	2021, 2026
Lower levels FMF	Segunda División/Liga Premier	4	1993–94, Cla–2016, Cla–2023, 2023–24	1992–93, Ind–2010, Ape–2022
Lower levels FMF	Campeón de Campeones Segunda División/Liga Premier	1	2023	2016

== Notable former players ==
- (Argentina) Pablo Bocco
- (Argentina) Esteban González
- (Argentina) Leopoldo Luque
- (Argentina) Eduardo Bacas
- (Bolivia) Marco Sandy
- (Colombia) David Álvarez Agudelo
- (Chile) Jorge Contreras
- (Chile) Kevin Harbottle
- (El Salvador) Mauricio Cienfuegos
- (Guatemala) Mario Acevedo
- (Mexico) Joaquín del Olmo
- (Mexico) Alex Dominguez
- (Mexico) Benjamín Galindo
- (Mexico) Diego de Buen
- (Mexico) Ezequiel Gallifa
- (Mexico) Héctor Miguel Herrera
- (Mexico) Miguel Ángel Herrera
- (Mexico) Sergio Lira
- (Mexico) Hugo Pineda
- (Mexico) Alejandro Ramírez
- (Mexico) Luis Reyes
- (Mexico) Ignacio Torres
- (Panama) René Mendieta
- (United States) Curt Onalfo
- (United States) (Mexico) William Yarbrough
- (Uruguay) Ruben Romeo Corbo
- (Uruguay) Bosco Frontán
- (Uruguay) Gonzalo Mastriani
- (Uruguay) Maicol Cabrera
- (Mexico) Víctor Hugo Lojero Alexanderson
- (Spain) (Mexico) Marc Crosas
- (Mexico) Javier Orozco
- (Honduras) Junior Lacayo
- (Costa Rica) Mynor Escoe
- (Mexico) Jair Pereira
- (Peru) Juan José Muñante

== Notable former managers ==
- (Chile) (Mexico) Carlos Reinoso
- (Mexico) José Luis Saldívar
- (Mexico) Mario García
- (Mexico) Daniel Guzmán
- (Mexico) Eduardo Fentanes
- (Mexico) Miguel de Jesús Fuentes
- (Mexico) Mario Pérez
- (Mexico) Gerardo Espinoza
- (Mexico) Francisco Fernández
- (Mexico) Gastón Obledo
- (Uruguay) (Mexico) Carlos Miloc
- (Argentina) Sergio Almirón
