= C.D. Caimanes de Tabasco =

Mexican football team (1994–1996)

Caimanes de Tabasco
- Full name: Club Deportivo Caimanes de Tabasco
- Founded: 1993
- Dissolved: 1996
- League: Segunda División de México

Club Deportivo Caimanes de Tabasco is a former Mexican football team that played in Primera División 'A' and in Segunda División de México.

== History ==
The team was founded in 1994 when Primera División 'A' began, when the club Sindicato Único de Obreros Organizados (SUOO) moved to Villahermosa, Tabasco. After the 1994–1995 season the club was relegated to Segunda División de México after losing to Cruz Azul Hidalgo in the relegation playoff. This caused the team a year later to dissolve.

Caimanes suffered the biggest loss in the history of Ascenso. 9–0 to Pachuca.

After there was a team named Lagartos de Tabasco who then changed their name to Guerreros de Tabasco, and presently there exists a team in Segunda División de México named Jaguares de Tabasco.
