= Atlético San Francisco =

- Full name: Atlético San Francisco
- Nickname: Los Brujos
- Founded: 1966; 60 years ago
- Dissolved: June 2020; 5 years ago
- Ground: Estadio Domingo Velázquez; San Francisco del Rincón, Guanajuato
- Capacity: 3,500
- Owner: Carlos Velázquez Villalpando
- Chairman: Carlos Velázquez Villalpando
- League: Liga Premier - Serie B
- 2019–20: 3rd (Tournament abandoned)
Home colours	Away colours

Atlético San Francisco, (simply known as Brujos) was a Mexican professional football club. The club played in the Serie B of the Segunda División de México, the third division level of Mexican football, and was based in San Francisco del Rincón, Guanajuato. It was established in 1966 and it has never played in the Primera División de México.

== History ==
Atlético San Francisco was founded in 1966 in San Francisco del Rincón, Guanajuato, and in that same year, the club joined the Segunda División de México. The club was never able to play in the Primera División de México. In 1994, the club played in the inaugural season of the new second-tier Primera División 'A' de México. In 1999, the club was relegated back to the Segunda División. Between 1999 and 2005, San Francisco played in the Segunda División de México. The club was relegated again to the Tercera División de México and played there between 2005 and 2019. On June 8, 2019, Atlético San Francisco defeated Aguacateros C.D. Uruapan in the semifinal of the 2018-19 season with this result the team won one of the two promotion place for the Segunda División de México.

== Club honours ==
- Tercera División de México: 1

1991-1992

== Players ==
=== Current squad ===
As of January 31, 2020
