= San Francisco del Rincón =

City and municipality in Guanajuato, Mexico

- City and municipality
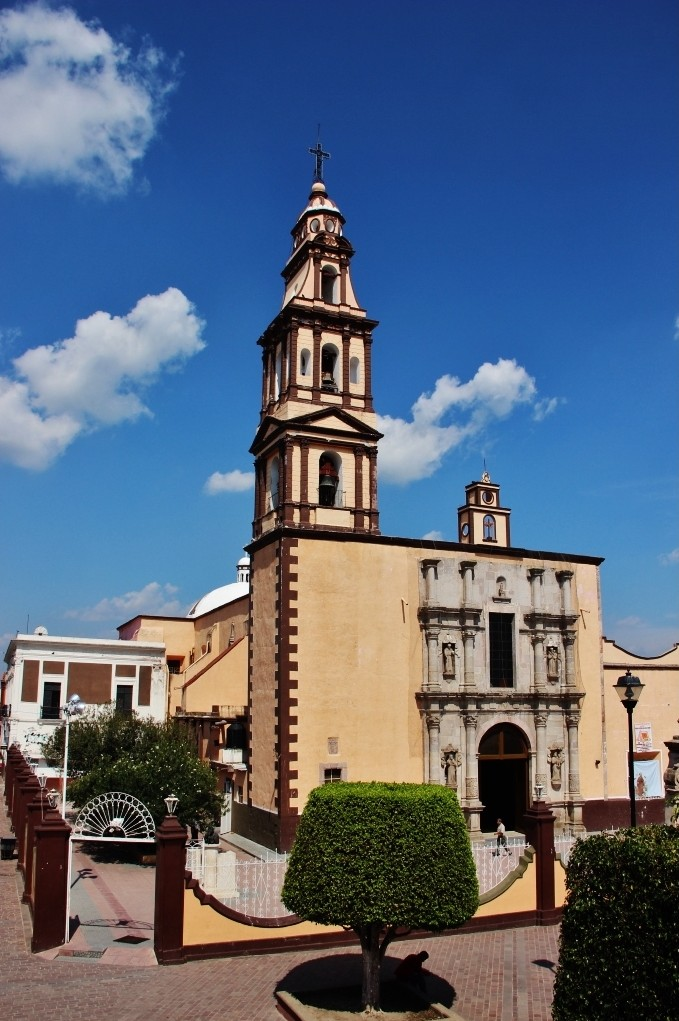
- Saint Francis of Assisi Church

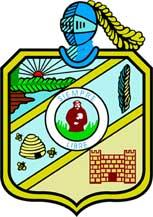
- Coat of arms
- Nickname: Capital del Sombrero
- Location of San Francisco del Rincon in Mexico
- Coordinates: 21°01′22″N 101°51′36″W

Area
  - Municipality: 425.4 km^{2} (164.2 sq mi)
  - Land: 415.73 km^{2} (160.51 sq mi)
  - City: 16.47 km^{2} (6.36 sq mi)
- Elevation: 1,750 m (5,740 ft)

Population (2020 census)
  - Municipality: 130,871
  - Density: 314.80/km^{2} (815.32/sq mi)
  - City: 79,772
  - City density: 4,843/km^{2} (12,540/sq mi)
- Demonym: Francorrinconense or Francorrinconés
- Website: Municipio de San Francisco del Rincón

San Francisco del Rincón is a city and municipality in the western part of the state of Guanajuato, Mexico. The city serves as the municipal seat for the municipality of San Francisco del Rincón. The city lies at the extreme northwest corner of the municipality.

The settlement was founded as San Francisco del Tule on January 21, 1607 by a group of families of the Purépecha and Hñähñu (Otomi) ethnicities. It was declared a villa (town) on September 6, 1865 and a city on March 27, 1867. It is located at 21°01′22″N 101°51′36″W, at an approximate altitude of 1,721 meters.

The population of the municipality in the 2010 census was 113,570 people, of whom 71,139 lived in the city of San Francisco del Rincón. The municipality has an areal extent of 415.73 km^{2} (160.51 sq mi). The city is the sixth-largest community in the state in population.

The city is home to Atlético San Francisco football club. The Vicente Fox Center of Studies, Library and Museum lies within the municipality.
