= Atlético Cuernavaca =

Mexican football club

- Full name: Atlético Cuernavaca
- Nickname: Los Leones (The Lions)
- Founded: 1969; 57 years ago
- Dissolved: 2007; 19 years ago
- Ground: Estadio Mariano Matamoros; Xochitepec, Morelos
- Capacity: 16,000
- Owner: Jorge Arizmendi
- Chairman: Miguel Velázquez
- League: Tercera División de México - Group VI
- Apertura 2007: Preseason
Home colours	Away colours

Alético Cuernavaca, was a Mexican football club based in Cuernavaca, Morelos. The club was founded in 1969 and played in the Tercera División de México until it was dissolved in 2007.
