= Estadio Cancún 86 =

Stadium in Mexico

Coordinates: 21.182051°N 86.830544°W

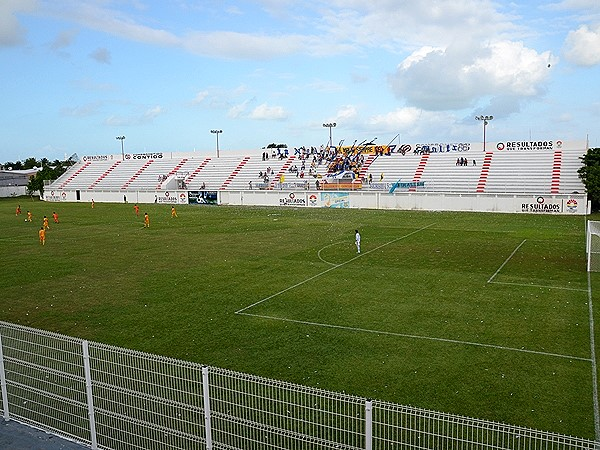
- Interactive map of Estadio Cancún 86
- Full name: Estadio Cancún 86
- Location: Cancún, Quintana Roo
- Owner: Benito Juárez Municipality
- Capacity: 6,390
- Surface: Grass

Construction
- Opened: 1986
- Architects: Rafael Lara; Rodolfo Páez

Tenants
- Pioneros de Cancún (1986–present); Pioneros Jr. Tiburones de Cancún (FAM) (2022)

Estadio Cancun 86 is a stadium in Cancún, Quintana Roo, Mexico. It is primarily used for association football and is the home field of Pioneros de Cancún. The stadium holds 6,390 people and is located at Prolongacion Av. Tulum Super Manzana 89. Events held at the stadium include the 2005 Mexican National Olympics.

The stadium was constructed for the Pioneros de Cancún in a project led by architects Rafael Lara and Rodolfo Páez. The Pioneros played their first game in the stadium on 27 December 1986, defeating Coras de Tepic 3–2 with the historic first goal coming from Fernando Cruz Pichardo.

The stadium hosted the Tiburones de Cancún of the Fútbol Americano de México (FAM) league for their final two home games of the 2022 FAM season.
