= Inter de Tijuana =

- Full name: Club Inter de Tijuana
- Nickname: Furia Amarilla
- Founded: 1989
- Dissolved: 1997
- Ground: Estadio del Cerro Colorado, Tijuana, Baja California, Mexico
- Capacity: 12,000
- League: Defunct
Home colours	Away colours

Club Inter de Tijuana was a Mexican football team that competed in Ascenso MX. They played in the Estadio del Cerro Colorado in Tijuana, Baja California, Mexico.

== History ==
The team was founded in 1989 and began in the Segunda División de México, however, team was not victorious in the 1989–90 season final against Leon which they lost 4–1 on aggregate score. Notably, the second division club defeated the visiting German champions, Bayern Munich, in January 1990 by way of penalty shootout after a strong performance by their goalkeeper Hugo Guerrero. The team included national team members such as Thomas Strunz, Jürgen Kohler, Klaus Augenthaler and Olaf Thon. For the 1994–95 season the league was renamed the Primera Division 'A'. For the Winter 1996 tournament they played one season under the name of Tijuana Stars and one tournament after, in Verano 1997 they played their last season under the new name Inter de Tijuana, being their last game in the stadium Cerro Colorado facing Marte, which they fell 1–0, dropping to the Segunda División de México.

== Stadium ==
The Estadio del Cerro Colorado hosted matches for Inter, Chivas Tijuana, Nacional and at the end for Trotamundos de Tijuana.

== Statistics ==
Long Tournaments

Season	Position	GP	W	T	L	GF	GA	PTS
1988–89	4	23	17	3	0	ND	ND	72
1989–90	1	38	19	13	6	50	32	63
1990–91	7	38	ND	ND	ND	ND	ND	51
1991–92	4	38	18	12	8	53	35	59
1992–93	6	38	15	9	14	56	47	49
1993–94	11	38	10	18	10	44	46	44
1994–95	5	28	11	8	9	35	28	30
1995–96	11	30	10	9	11	30	38	39

Short Tournaments

Season	Position	GP	W	T	L	GF	GA	PTS
Invierno 96 (*)	16	16	4	3	9	35	28	30
Verano 97	17	16	2	4	10	13	32	10

(*) as Tijuana Stars
