= Toros Mobil Park =

Baseball stadium in Tijuana

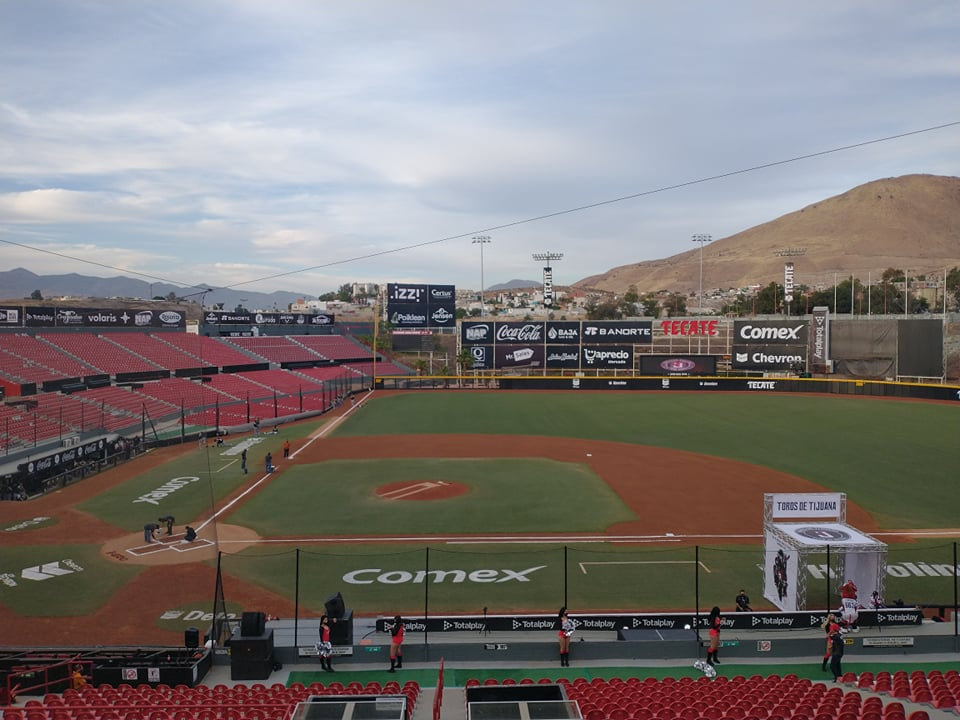
- Interactive map of Toros Mobil Park
- Full name: Toros Mobil Park
- Former names: Estadio Nacional de Tijuana; Estadio de Beisbol Calimax; Estadio Gasmart
- Location: Tijuana, Baja California, Mexico
- Coordinates: 32.483212°N 116.917480°W
- Capacity: 17,000
- Surface: Grass

Construction
- Opened: 1977
- Renovated: 2004
- Expanded: 2006

Tenants
- Potros de Tijuana (Mexican Pacific League, 1977-1991); Toros de Tijuana (Liga Mexicana de Béisbol, 2004); Potros de Tijuana (Liga Mexicana de Béisbol, 2005-2008); Tijuana Cimarrones (Golden Baseball League, 2010); Toros de Tijuana (Liga Norte de Mexico) (2013); Toros de Tijuana (Liga Mexicana de Béisbol) (2014-Present)

The Tijuana National Stadium (Spanish: Estadio Nacional de Tijuana), known as Toros Mobil Park (Spanish: Toros Mobil Park) for commercial reasons, is a ballpark in Tijuana, Baja California, Mexico. Opened in 1977, it is the home of the Toros de Tijuana of the Mexican League.

== History ==
The stadium was inaugurated on October 12, 1977, with a game between the Potros de Tijuana and the Águilas de Mexicali of the Mexican Pacific League.

In 2004, professional baseball returned, now with a Mexican Baseball League franchise under the name "Toros de Tijuana". The following year the team changed its name to "Potros de Tijuana", as they were known in their previous iterations and would be from 2005 to 2008. It played host to the Tijuana Cimarrones of the Golden Baseball League for one season in 2010. Most recently, it has been hosting the second iteration of the Toros de Tijuana, members of the Liga Norte de México (League of Northern Mexico). This iteration of the Toros de Tijuana would join the Mexican Baseball Leagues in 2014.

Tijuana National Stadium has also been the site of several México Second Division (second division) and México Third Division football clubs in the Mexican League System, such as Inter de Tijuana, Chivas Tijuana, and Nacional Tijuana.

It was expanded in 2006 from its original capacity of 14,000 to 17,000.
