= Atlético Tecomán =

- Full name: Club Deportivo Atlético Tecomán
- Nickname: Los Limoneros (The Lemon-makers)
- Founded: 1978; 48 years ago
- Ground: Estadio Víctor Sevilla; Tecomán, Colima
- Capacity: 4,000
- Chairman: Víctor Eduardo Sevilla Torres
- Manager: Mario Javier Hernández
- League: Tercera División de México
- 2020–21: 13th – Group X
Home colours	Away colours

Club Deportivo Atlético Tecomán is a Mexican football club based in Tecomán, Colima that competes in the Tercera División de México, the bottom level division of Mexican football. The club was founded in 1978 under the name Estudiantes de Tecomán and was owned by IAETAC, a private university in the city. With this name the team got its first title in 1983 when it won the Tercera División. During that period, Tecomán was an affiliated team of Tecos UAG, since the Autonomous University of Guadalajara is the owner of IAETAC.

During the 1980s and 1990s, it was the most important team in the state of Colima due to its continued presence in the Segunda División de México. In 1994, the team was not considered to enter the Primera División 'A' de México, so it lost relevance and began to play mostly in the Tercera División. In 2004, the team won its second championship in this division, however the team gave its place to Soccer Manzanillo.

In 2015, the team was registered in the Liga de Nuevos Talentos, participating only in that season.

For the 2019–20 Liga TDP season, the team license was rented to Rojos de Colima, also, the sale of the franchise and club facilities was announced. In 2020, the team returned to compete in the league.

== See also ==
- Football in Mexico
- Tercera División de México
