= Pioneros de Cancún =

Association football club in Mexico

- Full name: Deportivo Pioneros de Cancún Fútbol Club
- Nickname: Pioneros (Pioneers)
- Founded: 3 May 1984; 42 years ago
- Ground: Estadio Cancún 86
- Capacity: 6,390
- Owner(s): Asociación de Fútbol Pioneros, A.C.
- Chairman: Daniel Arreola
- Manager: Gerardo Castillo
- League: Liga Premier (Primera Premier)
- 2025–26: Regular phase: 7th of 13 (Group III); Final phase: Not qualified
- Website: http://www.pioneroscancun.com.mx
Home colours	Away colours

Deportivo Pioneros de Cancún Fútbol Club, simply known as Pioneros de Cancún, is a professional football club based in Cancún, Quintana Roo. The club competes in Liga Premier (Primera Premier), the third level of Mexican football, and plays its home matches at Estadio Cancún 86.

== History ==
The club was founded on 3 May 1984, and participated in the Tercera División. The following year, the club finished in third place and played in a promotional playoff with Lobos and Aguilas B. As a result, the club was promoted to the Segunda División. The owner decided to purchase a franchise in the Segunda División, which allowed the club the chance to be promoted to the Primera División.

Pioneros failed its attempts to be promoted, in the early 1990s, the city reduced resources, and the club once again fell into the lower divisions, and was later moved to Durango. In the mid-1990s, the club changed its name to Tucanes de Cancún but failed to gain popularity and was forced to change the name back to its original name Pioneros. It was not until 2006 when José del Carmen Vázquez Ávila bought the club and proposed a plan to have the franchise in the Primera División within a couple of years that the club regained local support.

Vázquez's project was made into action in 2007, when Atlante was moved from Mexico City to Cancún, which led to Pioneros becoming the second club in the city. In 2009, the franchise was moved to Acapulco and sold to a new club known as Guerreros de Acapulco. Pioneros maintained its Tercera División team, and in the 2010-11 season, an alliance was formed with Atlante to form a development team known as Pioneros Potros.

In August 2012, Pioneros were revived as a participating franchise in the Liga de Nuevos Talentos. During the 2013-14 season, Pioneros won the Apertura 2013 tournament. On 24 May 2014, Pioneros also won the Campeón de Campeones de la Liga de Nuevos Talentos, after defeating Selva Cañera, and achieved its promotion to the Liga Premier de Ascenso.

In January 2015, Pioneros moved to a new stadium and began playing at Estadio Andrés Quintana Roo, with the Estadio Cancún 86 becoming its alternative ground.

The Pioneros under-13 team participated in the 2019 CONCACAF Under-13 Champions League held in Costa Rica.

In July 2022, Pioneros de Cancún became the reserve and affiliate team of Cancún F.C., due to the Cancún City Council decided to hand over the administration of the club to the company that owns Cancún F.C. Since 2024, Pioneros became an independent club again, after the agreement between the Cancún City Council and Cancún F.C. ended.

== Kit ==
- Home kit: Red and white vertical stripes shirt, red shorts and socks.
- Away kit: White with red neck and shoulders, white shorts and socks.

First kit evolution

Home 1984	1985	2004	2006	2009	2013	2017–18 Third

== Players ==
=== Current squad ===
As of 8 September 2026

Note: Flags indicate national team as defined under FIFA eligibility rules; some limited exceptions apply. Players may hold more than one non-FIFA nationality.

No.	Pos.	Nation	Player
1	GK	MEX	Christian García
2	DF	MEX	Dylan Ramírez
3	DF	MEX	Ángel Ramírez
4	DF	MEX	Jorge Gómez
5	DF	MEX	Carlos Soto
6	MF	MEX	Andrés Gallo
7	MF	MEX	Emiliano Martínez
8	MF	MEX	Héctor González
10	FW	COL	Luis Mosquera
11	MF	MEX	Gibrán Ortiz
13	GK	MEX	Jorge de la Rosa
14	MF	MEX	Ricardo Rentería
16	MF	MEX	Andrés Encalada

No.	Pos.	Nation	Player
17	MF	MEX	Jocsan Landa
18	GK	MEX	Sergio Rubio
19	DF	MEX	Oscar Arredondo
20	DF	MEX	César Cayetano
21	DF	MEX	Dayron Canul
22	DF	MEX	Uriem Castrejón
23	FW	MEX	Diego Tello
24	DF	MEX	Antonio Zepeda
25	MF	MEX	Ricardo Peralta
27	MF	MEX	Joseph Zepeda
30	MF	MEX	Francisco Valdez
33	FW	MEX	Ronaldo Rubio

== Reserves ==
=== Pioneros Junior ===
Reserve team that competes in the Liga TDP, the fourth level of Mexican football.

== Honours ==
Domestic
Type	Competition	Titles	Seasons	Runners-up
Lower levels FMF	Liga de Nuevos Talentos	1	Ape–2013	Cla–2013
Lower levels FMF	Campeón de Campeones de la Liga de Nuevos Talentos	1	2013–14	—
