= New Cruz Azul Stadium =

Proposed football stadium for Cruz Azul

- Owner: Cooperativa La Cruz Azul
- Capacity: 40,000–45,000 (planned)

Construction
- Cost: US$250–300 million (2026 estimate)

Tenant
- Cruz Azul (planned)

The New Cruz Azul Stadium is a proposed football stadium intended to serve as the permanent home of the Mexican club Cruz Azul, which has played at rented venues in the Mexico City area since the early 1970s. Designs for a ground of the club's own have been drawn up since 1996, and in 2016 an agreement was reported with the Mexico City government to build on the site of the Velódromo Olímpico, but neither proposal reached construction. The project was taken up again by Víctor Velázquez, president of Cooperativa La Cruz Azul, who presented an architectural preview in May 2024; the cooperative approved a budget for the works in January 2026. Several sites in Mexico City and the State of Mexico have been reported or considered, but as of October 2026 the club had not officially confirmed a location and construction had not begun.

== History ==
=== Early proposals ===
Cruz Azul moved its home matches from the Estadio 10 de Diciembre in Hidalgo to Mexico City in the early 1970s, and has since played at rented venues including the Estadio Azteca, the Estadio Azul, the Estadio Olímpico Universitario and the Estadio Cuauhtémoc. A first design for a ground of its own, known as the Domo Azul, was presented to the club president, Guillermo Álvarez Cuevas, in 1996 by the architect Rafael Villegas-Guillot. It was to stand in the Magdalena Mixhuca sports complex near the Autódromo Hermanos Rodríguez and hold 30,000 spectators, with scope to expand to 50,000; the design was for an open dome that could be closed by a translucent cable system worked by pulleys, and included a club museum and a members' hall. The project was judged too costly and the club rented the Estadio Azulgrana, which it renamed the Estadio Azul, instead. A proposal to roof the Estadio Azul followed in 2003, but the cost of working on a ground owned by the Cosío family led the club to limit itself to repainting the stadium and improving its entrances.

Álvarez Cuevas announced plans for a new stadium on several occasions during his presidency, including a stated intention to begin the project in 2012, but none of these proposals progressed to construction. In October 2016, it was reported that Álvarez Cuevas and Horacio de la Vega, director of the Mexico City sports institute, had reached an agreement to build a stadium on the site of the Velódromo Olímpico in the Magdalena Mixhuca, with construction to begin the following year and finish by mid-2018, when the club's lease at the Estadio Azul was due to expire. The project was suspended around the 2018 elections and the subsequent change of city administration. Four sites remained under study at that point—the Velódromo, Iztapalapa, Xochimilco and Santa Fe—of which the first two had architectural plans drawn up.

=== Proposals under Velázquez ===
In April 2024, Velázquez, president of the board of Cooperativa La Cruz Azul, presented the construction of a new stadium to the cooperative's general assembly, which received the proposal favourably. The following month, shortly before the Clausura 2024 final against América, he published a video on social media showing a preview of the architectural project, without giving further details. Later in May, Marco Antonio Rodríguez Hurtado, the mayor on leave of Tlalnepantla de Baz, State of Mexico, said that the stadium would be built in the municipality. The plot, known as El Cerrito, is in San Pedro Barrientos, and the planned complex included a shopping centre, a convention centre and a hotel. The Tlalnepantla project did not proceed.

During 2024 and 2025, sites in the area of the former 18 de Marzo refinery in Azcapotzalco and in La Magdalena Contreras were reported in the press. The mayor of La Magdalena Contreras denied that any plans had been submitted to the borough. In April 2025, Velázquez said that difficulties in acquiring land, together with the club's lease at the Estadio Azteca running until 2031, could delay the project.

In February 2026, Velázquez met the Head of Government of Mexico City, Clara Brugada, to discuss the project. Following a second meeting, the parties agreed to study the viability of a site in Azcapotzalco and that the stadium would be built within Mexico City; press reports identified the Parque Bicentenario, on the former refinery grounds, as the most advanced option. That same month, the municipal president of Naucalpan, Isaac Montoya, offered two sites in the municipality.

In August 2026, Velázquez said the stadium had initially been announced for the State of Mexico, but that Claudia Sheinbaum, while Head of Government of Mexico City, had asked him to keep it in the capital. He also said that Sheinbaum, by then President of Mexico, had recently asked him whether a site had been found. He described a location in the metropolitan area as preferable for reaching the club's supporters, but said Hidalgo remained a possibility. The following month he said that land-regularisation requirements in Mexico City had held up the purchase of a plot, along with conditions on road access and the effect of a stadium on neighbouring communities.

In October 2026, TUDN journalist Adrián Esparza reported that the club was considering a site in Interlomas, in the municipality of Huixquilucan, State of Mexico. Other plots were also mentioned in the press, including one in an industrial park in Nextlalpan, State of Mexico, near Felipe Ángeles International Airport. No acquisition of land had been officially announced.

== Design and financing ==
Velázquez has given varying figures for the stadium's capacity. In May 2024, he cited between 35,000 and 45,000 spectators and said the venue would include an adjoining hotel. In April 2026, he gave a figure of between 40,000 and 45,000. His estimates of the construction period, counted from the laying of the first stone, have ranged from two to three years.

In a 2023 interview with ESPN, Velázquez estimated the cost of the project at between US$300 million and US$350 million, and said the stadium would be wholly owned by Cooperativa La Cruz Azul. In January 2026, the cooperative's general assembly approved a budget of 5,400 million pesos for the construction. In April 2026, Velázquez gave a revised estimate of between US$250 million and US$300 million, stating that financing had been secured and that only the location remained to be decided.
