= Guillermo Álvarez Macías =

Mexican general manager and cooperative activist

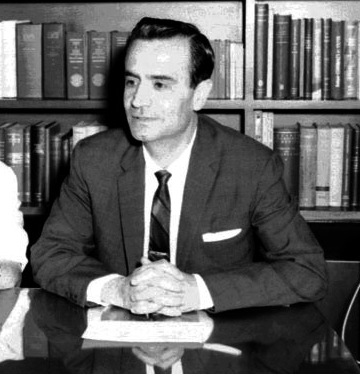
- Álvarez Macías in 1960
- Born: 16 October 1919; Cortazar, Guanajuato, Mexico
- Died: 18 December 1976 (aged 57); Tula de Allende, Hidalgo, Mexico
- Known for: General manager of Cooperativa La Cruz Azul; Chairman of Cruz Azul
- Spouse: María del Carmen Cuevas Saldaña
- Children: María del Carmen, María Gilda, Guillermo, Alfredo
- Parent(s): José Álvarez Roaro; Emilia Macías de Álvarez

Guillermo Álvarez Macías (16 October 1919 – 18 December 1976) was a Mexican general manager of the co-operative cement company Cooperativa La Cruz Azul from 1955 until his death in 1976. Álvarez Macías led the company's re-foundation into a cooperative company town. A prolific cooperative activist, Álvarez Macías is regarded as a prominent figure of modern cooperatives in Mexico.

While acting as general manager of Cooperativa La Cruz Azul, Álvarez Macías campaigned to establish the company's association football team, Cruz Azul, into a professional club where the players would have a considerable amount of control of the team's structure. He achieved this goal in 1961. The club managed to reach the top division in 1964. During his tenure as club chairman, Cruz Azul dominated the league, winning five national titles. Cruz Azul has since become one of the most popular football clubs in Mexico and its rapid rise to prominence in Mexican football is widely attributed to Álvarez Macías.

== Early life ==
Álvarez Macías was born to José Álvarez Roaro and Emilia Macías de Álvarez in Cortazar, Guanajuato, on 16 October 1919. His family moved to Jasso, Hidalgo, in 1924. From a very young age, Álvarez Macías was employed at Cooperativa La Cruz Azul as a vehicle mechanic.

== Cooperativa La Cruz Azul ==
On 12 January 1937, Álvarez Macías became an associate with the cooperative while holding the title of warehouse dispatcher.

Álvarez Macías led the company's re-construction into a cooperative company town which was established on 10 December 1953. In 1955, he was appointed as general manager of the cooperative. The reconstruction project created schools, paved streets, built restaurants, movie theaters, sport stadiums and fields. In addition, forms mutual insurance were established in order to enable the development of the communities in surrounding the cement plants. Álvarez Macías's philosophy was to promote social progress by sharing economic growth in order to raise the standard of living of workers and his own family.

During his tenure at Cooperativa La Cruz Azul, he established five other similar cooperatives in Hidalgo and in Lagunas, Oaxaca, where the company also had a cement factory.

== Cruz Azul ==
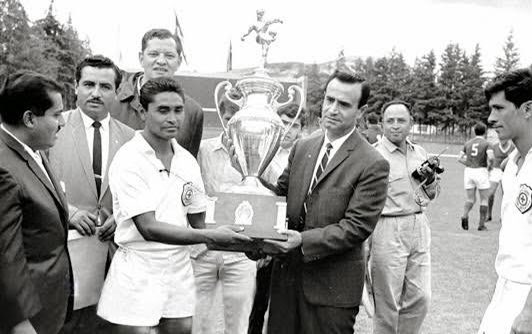
Álvarez Macías (right) holding the second division trophy in 1964

After being appointed as general manager of Cooperativa La Cruz Azul, Álvarez Macías heavily invested in the company's association football team in order to ensure the social, cultural, and sports development of workers and their families. The manner in which the club conducted was described to be similar to Corinthians Democracy, with matters of the club being voted on by the worker-players which included their salaries, the length and duration of training sessions, transfers, and even head managers.

Following the club's promotion, the Estadio 10 de Diciembre underwent renovations on 6 March 1964, when its wooden stands and dressing rooms were rebuilt. The club won its first national title in the 1968–1969 season, and under Álvarez's presidency the club achieved four more.

== Personal life ==
Álvarez Macías married María del Carmen Cuevas Saldaña in 1942, with whom he had four children: María del Carmen, María Gilda, Guillermo and Alfredo.

== Death ==
On 18 December 1976, Álvarez Macías, along with numerous local politicians, was to meet with newly elected president José López Portillo at the Endhó Dam located on the Tula River to discuss and survey the area for a planned agricultural experimental unit for food production. While waiting for López Portillo, Álvarez Macías suffered a heart attack and died.
