= Guillermo Alvarez =

Guillermo Álvarez may refer to:

- Guillermo Álvarez Macías (1919–1979), Mexican cooperative activist and general manager of Cemento Cruz Azul
- Guillermo Álvarez (baseball) (1926–2007), Mexican baseball professional
- Guillermo Álvarez Guedes (1927–2013), Cuban comedian, actor and businessman
- Guillermo Álvarez Iriarte (1939–2004), Uruguayan politician
- Billy Álvarez (born 1945), Mexican former businessman and former chairman of Cruz Azul
- Guillermo Alvarez (gymnast) (born 1982), American gymnast
