= 1961–62 Mexican Segunda División season =

Segunda División de México
- Season: 1961–62
- Champions: UNAM (1st Title)
- Matches: 240
- Goals: 793 (3.3 per match)

The 1961–62 Mexican Segunda División was the 12th season of the Mexican Segunda División. The season started on 17 June 1961 and concluded on 14 January 1962. It was won by UNAM.

== Changes ==
- Nacional was promoted to Primera División.
- Celaya was relegated from Primera División.
- Cruz Azul and Veracruz joined the league.
- Cuautla, Querétaro, Salamanca, San Luis, Valladolid and Vasco de Quiroga have dissolved.

== Teams ==
1961-62 Season Teams

Club	City	Stadium
Cataluña	Torreón	Estadio San Isidro
Celaya	Celaya	Estadio Miguel Alemán Valdés
Cruz Azul	Jasso	Estadio 10 de Diciembre
La Piedad	La Piedad	Estadio Juan N. López
Laguna	Torreón	Estadio San Isidro
Orizaba	Orizaba	Estadio Socum
Pachuca	Pachuca	Estadio Revolución Mexicana
Poza Rica	Poza Rica	Parque Jaime J. Merino
Refinería Madero	Ciudad Madero	Estadio Tampico
Tepic	Tepic	Estadio Nicolás Álvarez Ortega
Texcoco	Texcoco	Estadio Municipal de Texcoco
U. de N.L.	Monterrey	Estadio Tecnológico
UNAM	Mexico City	Estadio Olímpico Universitario
Veracruz	Veracruz	Parque Deportivo Veracruzano
Ciudad Victoria	Ciudad Victoria	Estadio Marte R. Gómez
Zamora	Zamora	Estadio Moctezuma

== League table ==
Pos	Team	Pld	W	D	L	GF	GA	GD	Pts	Promotion, qualification or relegation
1	UNAM (C, P)	30	18	9	3	78	40	+38	45	Promotion to Primera División
2	Refinería Madero	30	17	9	4	69	31	+38	43	
3	Poza Rica	30	18	7	5	60	34	+26	43	
4	Cruz Azul	30	15	6	9	63	45	+18	36	
5	Zamora	30	13	7	10	45	41	+4	33	
6	Ciudad Victoria	30	9	12	9	51	44	+7	30	
7	Texcoco	30	13	4	13	54	57	−3	30	
8	Pachuca	30	10	10	10	48	51	−3	30	
9	Orizaba	30	11	7	12	51	65	−14	29	
10	Celaya	30	9	9	12	37	44	−7	27	
11	Tepic	30	10	7	13	44	55	−11	27	
12	Veracruz	30	8	10	12	40	48	−8	26	
13	U. de N.L.	30	9	6	15	49	59	−10	24	
14	Laguna	30	5	11	14	37	52	−15	21	
15	La Piedad	30	8	4	18	31	59	−28	20	
16	Cataluña	30	5	6	19	36	68	−32	16	

Source: RSSSF
(C) Champions; (P) Promoted

== Results ==
Home \ Away	CAT	CEL	CAZ	LPD	LAG	ORI	PAC	PZR	RMA	TEP	TEX	UNL	UNM	VER	VIC	ZAM
Cataluña	—	1–3	2–3	3–0	3–2	2–3	1–1	1–3	1–6	2–1	1–2	1–0	1–1	3–0	1–1	3–3
Celaya	0–0	—	2–2	0–0	3–1	2–1	3–2	2–0	0–0	2–2	2–2	3–3	2–2	0–1	1–1	4–1
Cruz Azul	3–2	2–1	—	4–1	2–0	1–0	2–0	1–0	2–2	7–1	2–1	5–2	2–2	2–1	5–4	2–2
La Piedad	2–1	2–1	2–1	—	0–0	3–1	1–2	0–2	2–0	2–0	0–2	3–2	0–3	3–0	1–1	0–1
Laguna	0–0	1–2	0–1	3–0	—	5–2	0–1	1–2	1–1	1–1	1–2	2–2	2–2	1–1	0–0	1–1
Orizaba	1–0	2–0	3–2	4–1	2–2	—	2–2	2–3	0–0	2–1	2–0	3–2	1–1	1–1	0–0	3–2
Pachuca	5–2	2–0	3–2	2–1	1–1	4–1	—	0–0	2–1	2–0	2–3	0–0	1–2	1–1	3–3	0–1
Poza Rica	2–1	3–0	1–1	2–0	3–1	5–1	5–0	—	1–1	3–1	3–2	1–1	3–2	2–1	1–1	1–2
Refinería Madero	6–0	1–0	1–0	4–0	4–1	4–1	3–1	2–0	—	3–1	4–2	4–1	3–0	4–2	2–2	3–1
Tepic	2–0	1–0	3–2	2–1	1–0	3–0	2–2	1–2	3–2	—	5–1	2–3	1–2	1–1	2–1	0–0
Texcoco	4–1	3–0	2–1	3–0	1–2	4–4	3–4	1–2	0–1	1–0	—	3–2	0–2	2–2	2–1	2–1
U. de N.L.	3–0	1–2	1–1	5–2	4–1	0–1	3–1	0–1	0–0	1–3	0–1	—	3–2	2–1	2–1	0–1
UNAM	5–1	2–0	2–1	3–2	6–2	6–4	4–1	2–2	3–1	3–1	2–1	7–0	—	3–1	2–0	3–0
Veracruz	3–1	3–0	2–1	2–2	2–1	0–1	2–2	3–2	2–2	0–0	3–1	0–3	2–2	—	1–2	0–1
Ciudad Victoria	1–0	1–0	0–2	4–0	1–2	7–2	1–1	2–4	1–1	2–2	5–1	4–3	0–0	2–1	—	2–1
Zamora	2–1	1–2	2–1	1–0	1–2	2–1	1–0	1–1	1–3	7–1	2–2	3–0	2–2	0–1	1–0	—

Source: RSSSF
Legend: Blue = home team win; Yellow = draw; Red = away team win.
