= XHCA-FM =

Radio station in Lagunas, Oaxaca

- Lagunas, Oaxaca, Mexico; Mexico
- Frequency: 103.9 FM
- Branding: Azul FM

Programming
- Format: Full-service

Ownership
- Owner: Cemento Cruz Azul; (Club Deportivo Social y Cultural Cruz Azul, A.C.)

History
- First air date: May 16, 1988 (permit)
- Call sign meaning: Cruz Azul

Technical information
- Class: B1
- ERP: 3 kW
- HAAT: 313.6 m
- Transmitter coordinates: 16°44′32.2″N 95°5′28.8″W

XHCA-FM is a noncommercial radio station in Lagunas, Oaxaca. It is owned by Cemento Cruz Azul, the largest employer in Lagunas, and broadcasts a general news and music format known as Azul FM.

== History ==
XHCA originated as a concept in 1986 to provide information and entertainment to the workers in the three shifts at the Cruz Azul cement plant in Lagunas. It was permitted in 1988 with an effective radiated power of 20 watts. The station is one of several set up by employers in small Mexican towns in the 1970s and 1980s: XHSCO-FM in Salina Cruz was originally owned by PEMEX, while XELAC-AM in Lázaro Cárdenas, Michoacán was created with the construction of the SICARTSA iron and steel mill.

Originally known as Estéreo Amistad, XHCA was run by four members of the cooperative, while the station's air staff also were company employees.

In 1999, the station increased its effective radiated power to 3,000 watts from a tower atop Cerro Palma Sola, the region's primary broadcast site. This gives the station a much larger coverage area than Lagunas, reaching as far south as Salina Cruz and including small portions of Veracruz and Chiapas.

Programming includes a variety of music, news, and specialty social and educational programs.
