= 1963–64 Mexican Segunda División season =

Segunda División de México
- Season: 1963–64
- Champions: Cruz Azul (1st Title)
- Matches played: 240
- Goals scored: 903 (3.76 per match)

The 1963–64 Mexican Segunda División was the 14th season of the Mexican Segunda División. The season started on 29 June 1963 and concluded on 7 February 1964. It was won by Cruz Azul. For the following season, the Primera División had an expansion from 14 to 16 teams, for which a promotion playoff was played at the end of this season.

== Changes ==
- Zacatepec was promoted to Primera División.
- Tampico was relegated from Primera División.
- Cataluña was renamed as C.F. Torreón.

== Teams ==
1963-64 Season Teams

Club	City	Stadium
Celaya	Celaya	Estadio Miguel Alemán Valdés
Cruz Azul	Jasso	Estadio 10 de Diciembre
La Piedad	La Piedad	Estadio Juan N. López
Laguna	Torreón	Estadio San Isidro
Nuevo León	Monterrey	Estadio Tecnológico
Orizaba	Orizaba	Estadio Socum
Pachuca	Pachuca	Estadio Revolución Mexicana
Poza Rica	Poza Rica	Parque Jaime J. Merino
Refinería Madero	Ciudad Madero	Estadio Tampico
Tampico	Tampico	Estadio Tampico
Tepic	Tepic	Estadio Nicolás Álvarez Ortega
Texcoco	Texcoco	Estadio Municipal de Texcoco
Torreón	Torreón	Estadio Revolución
Veracruz	Veracruz	Parque Deportivo Veracruzano
Ciudad Victoria	Ciudad Victoria	Estadio Marte R. Gómez
Zamora	Zamora	Estadio Moctezuma

== League table ==
Pos	Team	Pld	W	D	L	GF	GA	GAv	Pts	Qualification or relegation
1	Cruz Azul (C, P)	30	19	7	4	67	33	2.030	45	Promoted to Primera División
2	Poza Rica	30	18	8	4	89	35	2.543	44	Promotion Playoff to Primera División
3	Refinería Madero	30	18	6	6	68	29	2.345	42	Promotion Playoff to Primera División
4	Veracruz	30	15	8	7	57	36	1.583	38	Promotion Playoff to Primera División
5	Pachuca	30	15	7	8	60	43	1.395	37	
6	Tampico	30	12	9	9	56	38	1.474	33	
7	Nuevo León	30	14	5	11	64	55	1.164	33	
8	Laguna	30	12	6	12	71	62	1.145	30	
9	Ciudad Victoria	30	11	6	13	49	60	0.817	28	
10	Orizaba	30	11	5	14	55	55	1.000	27	
11	Torreón	30	8	7	15	44	62	0.710	23	
12	Texcoco	30	8	7	15	45	65	0.692	23	
13	Tepic	30	9	4	17	52	66	0.788	22	
14	Celaya	30	7	7	16	38	70	0.543	21	
15	La Piedad	30	7	4	19	51	102	0.500	18	
16	Zamora	30	6	4	20	37	92	0.402	16	

Source: RSSSF
(C) Champions; (P) Promoted

== Results ==
Home \ Away	CEL	CAZ	LPD	LAG	NVL	ORI	PAC	PZR	RMA	TAM	TEP	TEX	TOR	VER	VIC	ZAM
Celaya	—	1–3	1–0	1–1	1–2	1–0	3–1	1–2	0–2	1–1	0–0	2–2	5–3	1–1	4–1	4–1
Cruz Azul	5–0	—	8–3	3–0	3–0	3–2	0–0	2–2	3–2	2–1	1–2	5–1	1–1	1–0	2–0	7–1
La Piedad	2–1	0–2	—	5–3	1–2	4–3	1–0	2–6	1–3	3–5	2–1	1–1	2–0	1–1	0–3	3–3
Laguna	5–2	2–2	6–2	—	1–1	4–2	4–1	3–2	1–1	1–2	4–1	4–0	3–3	2–3	5–1	4–0
Nuevo León	1–1	0–1	6–0	3–1	—	3–2	1–0	1–1	3–2	2–1	1–4	0–1	6–2	3–0	1–1	7–1
Orizaba	2–0	1–2	6–3	3–2	3–1	—	2–4	2–1	1–1	2–1	1–4	0–1	6–2	3–0	1–1	7–1
Pachuca	6–1	3–1	7–2	4–2	5–3	3–2	—	1–1	0–2	2–1	4–3	3–1	1–1	4–2	3–1	2–0
Poza Rica	7–0	0–0	7–2	6–1	7–2	2–4	1–0	—	2–2	3–0	3–0	5–2	5–0	0–4	5–1	6–0
Refinería Madero	4–0	0–0	2–1	3–2	4–2	3–0	3–0	0–3	—	0–0	9–1	2–0	4–0	1–0	0–1	6–0
Tampico	4–0	3–1	10–0	3–0	2–1	0–0	0–0	1–1	1–1	—	3–1	2–4	3–1	0–0	3–1	2–3
Tepic	3–0	1–2	2–2	2–3	2–3	3–1	1–1	0–1	2–3	3–1	—	3–2	3–0	0–3	0–1	4–1
Texcoco	1–1	2–2	3–2	0–2	2–3	2–1	0–1	1–3	0–4	1–1	2–1	—	3–3	0–2	2–0	3–0
Torreón	1–2	1–2	3–0	1–0	1–0	1–0	0–1	1–4	2–0	1–2	1–1	0–2	—	4–0	2–3	3–1
Veracruz	3–2	3–0	1–2	2–1	2–2	1–1	0–0	1–1	2–0	0–0	4–1	5–2	4–2	—	4–1	6–1
Ciudad Victoria	4–1	0–1	4–3	2–2	3–1	1–2	3–3	1–1	1–2	2–0	2–1	3–2	1–1	0–1	—	2–1
Zamora	2–1	1–2	2–1	1–2	0–3	1–3	1–0	0–1	0–2	1–3	2–5	3–2	3–3	2–0	4–4	—

Source: RSSSF
Legend: Blue = home team win; Yellow = draw; Red = away team win.

== Promotion Playoff ==
In order to increase the number of team from 14 to 16 for the 1964–65 season the league made a playoff. The playoff was composed of the lowest team from Primera division and the 2nd-5th teams in the standings from Segunda Division as Cruz Azul had earned automatic promotion. The playoff was played between January 16 and February 6, 1964. All games were played in Estadio Olímpico Universitario, Mexico City.

Pos	Team	Pld	W	D	L	GF	GA	GD	Pts	Promotion	NAC	VER	RMA	PZR
1	Nacional	3	1	2	0	4	3	+1	4	Remained at Primera División		1–1	1–1	2–1
2	Veracruz	3	1	1	1	4	4	0	3	Tiebreaker				3–2
3	Refinería Madero	3	1	1	1	3	7	−4	3	Tiebreaker		1–0		
4	Poza Rica	3	1	0	2	9	6	+3	2	Remained at Segunda División			6–1	

Source: RSSSF
Rules for classification: 1st points; 2nd head-to-head points; 3rd head-to-head goal difference; 4th head-to-head goals scored; 5th goal difference; 6th number of goals scored

=== Tiebreaker match ===
7 February 1964	Refinería Madero	0–0 (4–5 p)	Veracruz	Mexico City
		Report		Stadium: Estadio Olímpico Universitario
