= Cruz Azul =

Association football club in Mexico

- Full name: Club de Futbol Cruz Azul S.A. de C.V.
- Nicknames: La Máquina (The Machine); Los Celestes (The Sky Blues); Los Cementeros (The Cement Workers); Las Liebres (The Hares); Los de La Noria (Those from La Noria)
- Short name: CAZ
- Founded: 22 May 1927; 99 years ago (as Club Deportivo, Social y Cultural Cruz Azul, A.C.) (Note: Controversy exists on the date of the founding of Cruz Azul. On 22 March 1927, workers from the company Cooperativa La Cruz Azul, together with Carlos Garcés, decided to form a football team. This founding date is kept in the club's Hall of Fame, as well as in various official publications of the team. However, after playing several matches internally, on 22 May 1927, Cruz Azul played its first official match against Jilotepec. Because of this, the club has adopted this date as its founding date in recent years.)
- Ground: Estadio Azteca
- Capacity: 87,523
- Owner: Cooperativa La Cruz Azul
- President: Víctor Velázquez
- Head coach: Joel Huiqui
- League: Liga MX
- Clausura 2026: Regular phase: 3rd of 18; Final phase: Champions
- Website: cfcruzazul.com
Home colours	Away colours	Third colours

Club de Futbol Cruz Azul S.A. de C.V., commonly referred to as Cruz Azul, is a professional football club based in Mexico City. The club competes in Liga MX, the top division of Mexican football. Founded in 1927 in Jasso, Hidalgo, by workers of the Cooperativa La Cruz Azul, as Club Deportivo, Social y Cultural Cruz Azul, A.C., the club relocated to Mexico City in 1971. It was renamed Cruz Azul Fútbol Club, A.C. in 2012, before adopting its current name in 2022. The team plays its home matches at Estadio Azteca, one of the largest stadiums in the world.

Domestically, the club has won ten league titles, four Copa MX, four Campeón de Campeones, and holds the joint-record with one Supercopa de la Liga MX and one Supercopa MX. In international competitions, with seven titles, the club holds the joint-record for the most successful club in the history of the CONCACAF Champions Cup/Champions League. Cruz Azul also holds numerous distinctions, including being the club with the most league runner-up finishes (12), and the first team from CONCACAF to reach the final of the Copa Libertadores. In addition, the club achieved a continental treble in the 1968–69 season by winning the Primera División, Copa México and CONCACAF Champions' Cup, becoming the first CONCACAF club and third worldwide to accomplish this feat, and later the first club worldwide—and one of only five—to have won the continental treble twice.

Cruz Azul's golden era came under manager Raúl Cárdenas, who led a three-peat in the CONCACAF Champions' Cup between 1969 and 1971 as the club established itself as a dominant force in Mexican football and earned its La Máquina (The Machine) nickname for its relentless scoring output during this period; Ignacio Trelles added back-to-back league titles at the turn of the 1980s, and between them the two managers delivered a combined seven league titles through the 1960s and 1970s. Juan Reynoso—a defender in the team's 1997 league title-winning squad—later managed the club to a ninth league title in 2021, its first during the Liga MX era, ending a 23-year wait for the domestic title. Joel Huiqui then guided Cruz Azul to a tenth league title in 2026.

In 2026, Cruz Azul was named by the International Federation of Football History & Statistics as the 71st-best club in the world and the highest-ranked club in CONCACAF for the 2025 calendar year. Cruz Azul maintains a long-standing rivalry with América, a fixture commonly known as the Clásico Joven. According to several polls, it is the third-most popular team in Mexico, behind only América and Guadalajara. Within the Mexico City metropolitan area, it is generally regarded as the second-most supported club, behind América and ahead of Pumas UNAM. Cruz Azul is also one of seven Mexican clubs that have never been relegated. Together, these clubs are considered the Big Four of Mexican football.

== History ==
=== 1927–1961: Formation and amateur years ===
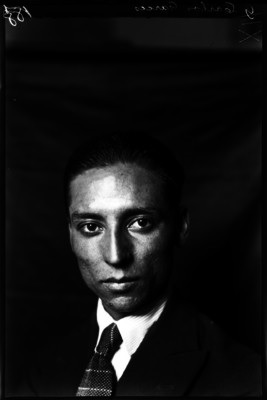
Carlos Garcés López, who campaigned for the company to adopt football as its sport.

Cruz Azul originated at the cement works of the Compañía Manufacturera de Cemento Portland La Cruz Azul in Jasso, Hidalgo, the predecessor of Cooperativa La Cruz Azul. The works dated to 1881, when the British businessman Henry Gibbon established a lime factory at the site. In 1925, the company planned to form a baseball team, reflecting the sport's popularity in the area. Carlos Garcés López, a dentist employed by the company, argued for football instead. A former América player, he had been part of Mexico's squad in the national team's first official matches in 1923 and was in the squad for the 1928 Olympics. After sustained lobbying, the company held a referendum on 22 March 1927 in which football was chosen. A football pitch replaced the baseball diamond, and the team was formally established on 22 May 1927, with Garcés López as its first manager. In its early years, the team played regional tournaments in which all of its players were company workers.

In 1931, during the Great Depression, falling demand for cement pushed the company toward bankruptcy, and on 1 March 1931 it was sold to the cement firm La Tolteca. A group of 192 workers organised and sued the company's executives to stop the transfer of the property, which was scheduled for 15 October 1931. The Hidalgo state government ruled in the workers' favour, and they took control of the plant on 2 November 1931, agreeing to repay its cost over ten years. On 21 May 1932, the governor of Hidalgo, Bartolomé Vargas Lugo, decreed the 192 workers collective owners of the plant by expropriation, and on 29 January 1934 the company was reconstituted as the Cooperativa Manufacturera de Cemento Portland La Cruz Azul, S.C.L. When the debt was settled in 1941, the club organised a celebratory match against Real España, which ended 0–0. (Note: Accounts of the cooperative's formation differ on some dates and terms. Expansión places its constitution on 2 November 1931 and its formal registration in January 1934, and reports that the debt was repaid in nine years, whereas other sources give 2 November 1941, ten years after the workers took over the plant.) Commentators have linked the club's origins in a workers' cooperative to its working-class image.

The team won the Hidalgo amateur league title repeatedly between 1932 and 1943, and on eight occasions represented the state in national amateur tournaments. From the mid-1930s to the late 1940s, it regularly travelled to Mexico City to play the reserve teams of Atlante, Necaxa, Marte and Real España at Parque Necaxa. By 1937, the club had a considerable following in both Hidalgo and Mexico City. Guillermo Álvarez Macías, later the head of the cooperative, played as a midfielder for the team in this period.

On 10 December 1953, the cooperative's general assembly put Álvarez Macías in charge of the company. Employed by the company since childhood, he had begun as an automotive mechanic and spent more than two decades rising through its ranks. He planned to turn the cooperative's settlement into a functioning town, with the aim of modernising it and raising the standard of living of workers and their families. He invested in cultural and recreational activities and in the football club, whose proceeds were used to improve the worker-players' living conditions.

In 1958, club captain Luis Velázquez Hernández represented the club before the Mexican Football Federation in a bid for official membership. In Mexico City he met Paulino Sánchez, who had ties to prominent football figures, and the two met Joaquín Soria Terrazas and Ignacio Trelles to discuss admitting the club. Sánchez argued in the club's favour, citing its record in amateur and reserve tournaments; Álvarez Macías, who believed the club was not ready for professional football, was displeased by the move.

To prepare for membership, Sánchez became the club's head manager. Federation rules required member clubs to have a reserve team, so Cruz Azul bought Lafayette, a financially troubled club from Colonia Moctezuma, in a deal completed in 1960. Plans for a stadium meeting federation standards were drawn up in 1960, and Estadio 10 de Diciembre was built between 1961 and 1963.

Although it did not yet hold federation membership, the club was invited to enter the 1960–61 Copa de la Segunda División de México, a federation-sanctioned competition. Its first match, on 2 April 1961 in Jasso, was a 2–1 win over Zamora; the return leg on 9 April ended in a 3–3 draw. Cruz Azul then beat Querétaro 1–0 on aggregate before losing to Pumas UNAM. The performance led the federation to grant the club official registration as a professional side.

=== 1961–1968: Transition to professionalism and promotion ===
Cruz Azul was officially registered to compete in Mexico's second-tier professional league for the 1961–62 season. Around this time, federation rules barring the use of company names in club titles led Álvarez Macías to request the renaming of the town of Jasso, Hidalgo, to Ciudad Cooperativa Cruz Azul, allowing the club to keep the name "Cruz Azul" as a reference to a place rather than a commercial brand.

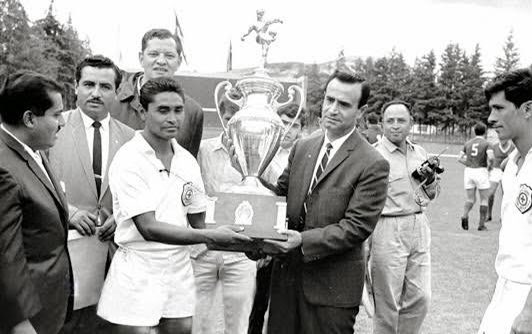
Club captain Porfirio Gutiérrez (left) and Guillermo Álvarez Macías (right) holding the Segunda División trophy in 1964.

The Hungarian coach Jorge Marik, who had previously managed Atlas and Atlante, took charge in 1961. In its first two professional seasons, the club finished fourth of 16 in the 1961–62 season and fifth of 16 in the 1962–63 season. Under Marik, Cruz Azul won the 1963–64 Segunda División title, finishing with 19 wins, seven draws and four losses from 30 matches for 45 points, and secured direct promotion to the Primera División with a 7–1 win over Zamora on 19 January 1964.

Following promotion, Estadio 10 de Diciembre was renovated from 6 March 1964, with its wooden stands and dressing rooms rebuilt to meet top-flight regulations. Cruz Azul made its Primera División debut on 6 June 1964, losing 4–1 away to Monterrey, and recorded its first top-flight win two matchdays later, 3–2 away to Oro on 21 June 1964. The club finished its debut 1964–65 season in eighth place, with ten wins, nine draws and 11 losses. Marik departed after a weaker 1965–66 campaign, in which the team finished 13th of 16 clubs. Walter Ormeño managed the side for three matches before Raúl Cárdenas was appointed on 20 October 1966, becoming the club's first Mexican head coach in the top flight.

=== 1968–1980: Dominant era and birth of La Máquina ===
Under Cárdenas, Cruz Azul won its first league title in the 1968–69 season, finishing top of the table on points with 18 wins, eight draws and four losses. The same season, the club also won its first Copa México and first CONCACAF Champions' Cup, a continental treble that made Cruz Azul the first club in Mexico and the CONCACAF region to win all three competitions within five years of reaching the top flight. Because the league and cup were won in the same season, Cruz Azul was also automatically awarded the Campeón de Campeones title, giving the club four major titles in a single calendar year—a feat no other Mexican club has achieved.

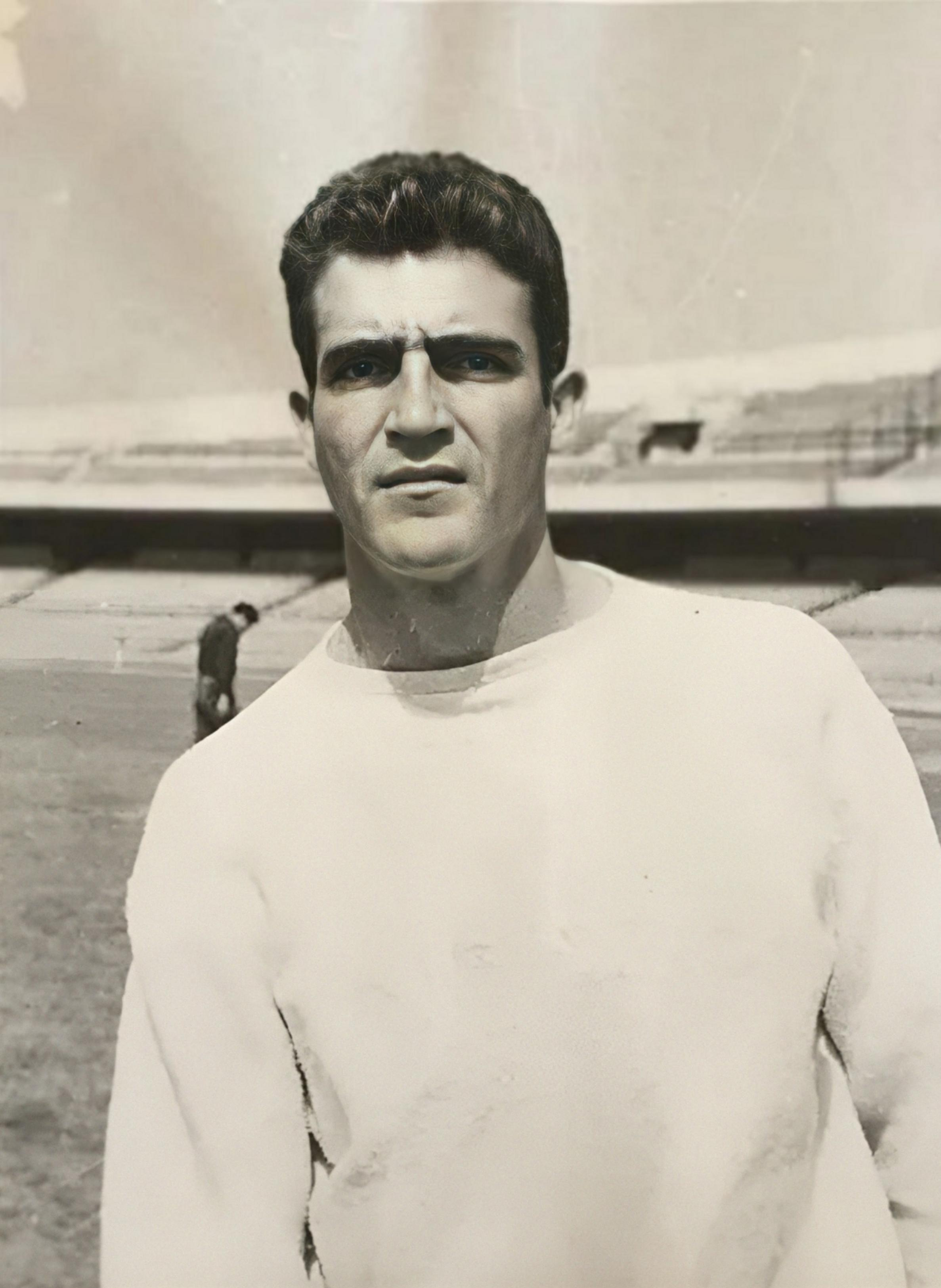
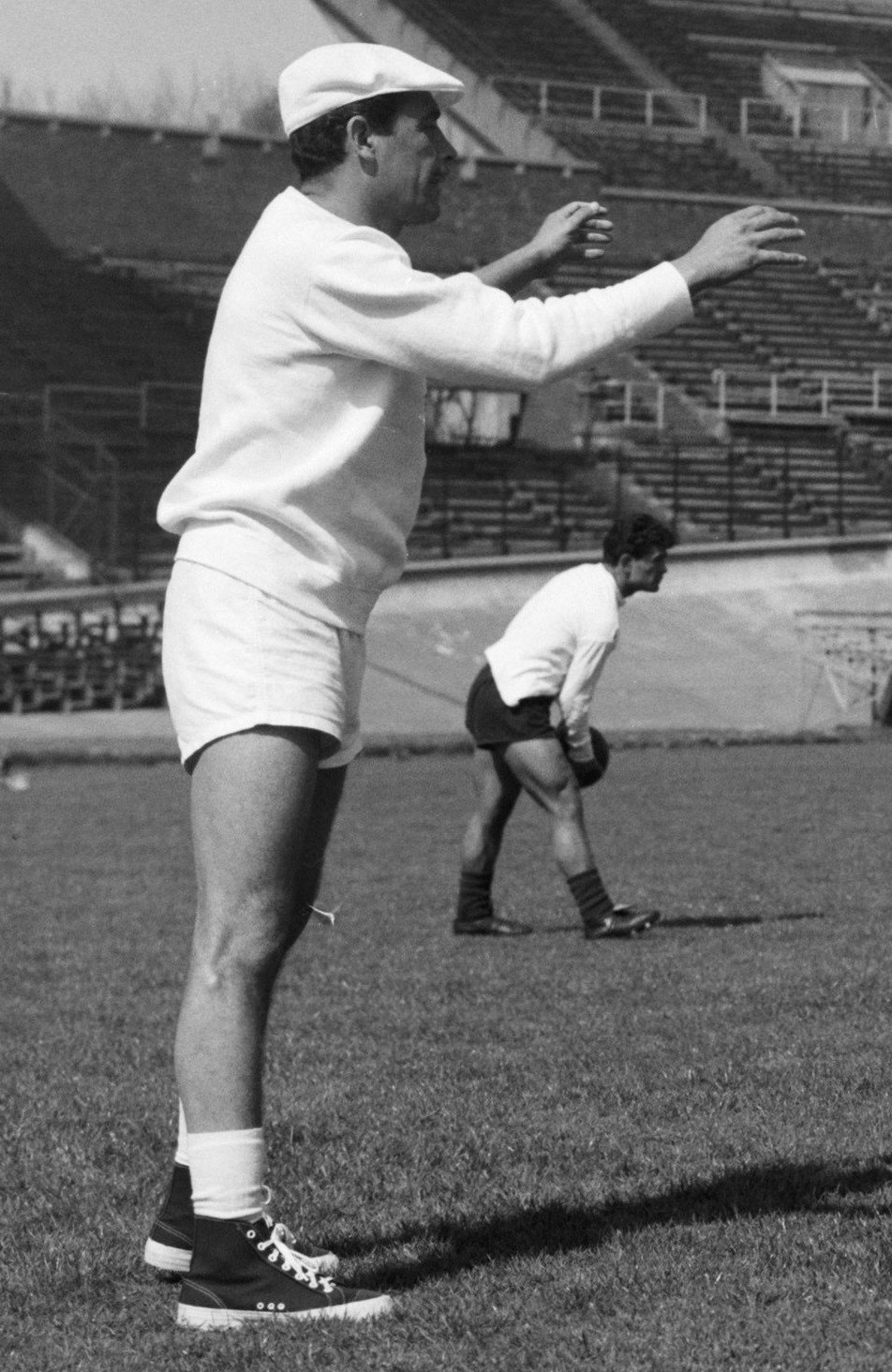
Raúl Cárdenas (left) won 11 titles as Cruz Azul's head coach between 1966 and 1975; Ignacio Trelles (right) added two more to close the decade.

In the 1969–70 season, Cruz Azul finished second behind Guadalajara, level with Veracruz on 39 points; the runner-up place was decided by a play-off, which Cruz Azul won on penalties at Estadio Azteca on 4 January 1970. Due to Mexico hosting the 1970 FIFA World Cup, the following tournament was held under a separate format and name, México 1970, contested in two phases either side of the World Cup; Cruz Azul won it to claim a second league title. On 15 December that year, the club was also awarded the 1970 CONCACAF Champions' Cup after Saprissa and Transvaal withdrew from the tournament's second phase.

In 1971, Cruz Azul relocated from Ciudad Cooperativa Cruz Azul to Mexico City, moving into Estadio Azteca after outgrowing Estadio 10 de Diciembre. Cruz Azul won a third consecutive CONCACAF title in the 1971 edition, whose final was played at the new stadium on 19 April 1972 and won 5–1, with two goals each from Eladio Vera and Octavio Muciño and one from Fernando Bustos, and went on to finish runners-up to Nacional of Uruguay in the 1971 Copa Interamericana. On 21 December 1971, Cruz Azul signed Argentine goalkeeper Miguel Marín from Vélez Sarsfield for $30,000; he went on to anchor the team for a decade. During this period, the team gained the nickname La Máquina ("The Machine"), in reference to the consistency of its results and playing style. Cruz Azul won three consecutive league titles between 1971 and 1974. In the 1971–72 final, Cruz Azul beat América 4–1 at Estadio Azteca; in 1972–73 it defeated León over a three-match final; and in 1973–74 it beat Atlético Español to complete the run, a result that also secured that season's Campeón de Campeones title.

Cárdenas left Cruz Azul in 1975. Ignacio Trelles took charge of the club the following year and, on 18 December 1976, long-serving club president Guillermo Álvarez Macías died of a heart attack at the age of 56 while awaiting a meeting with president José López Portillo. Joel Luis Becerril Benítez took interim control of the cooperative, and in 1978 the general assembly of members formally elected him to lead it for a ten-year term. Under Trelles, Cruz Azul won consecutive league titles to close the decade: the 1978–79 title against Pumas UNAM and the 1979–80 title against Tigres UANL. Between 1969 and 1980, Cruz Azul won seven league titles, one Copa México and two Campeón de Campeones titles, establishing the club as the most successful in Mexican football during the decade.

=== 1981–1996: Years without a title ===
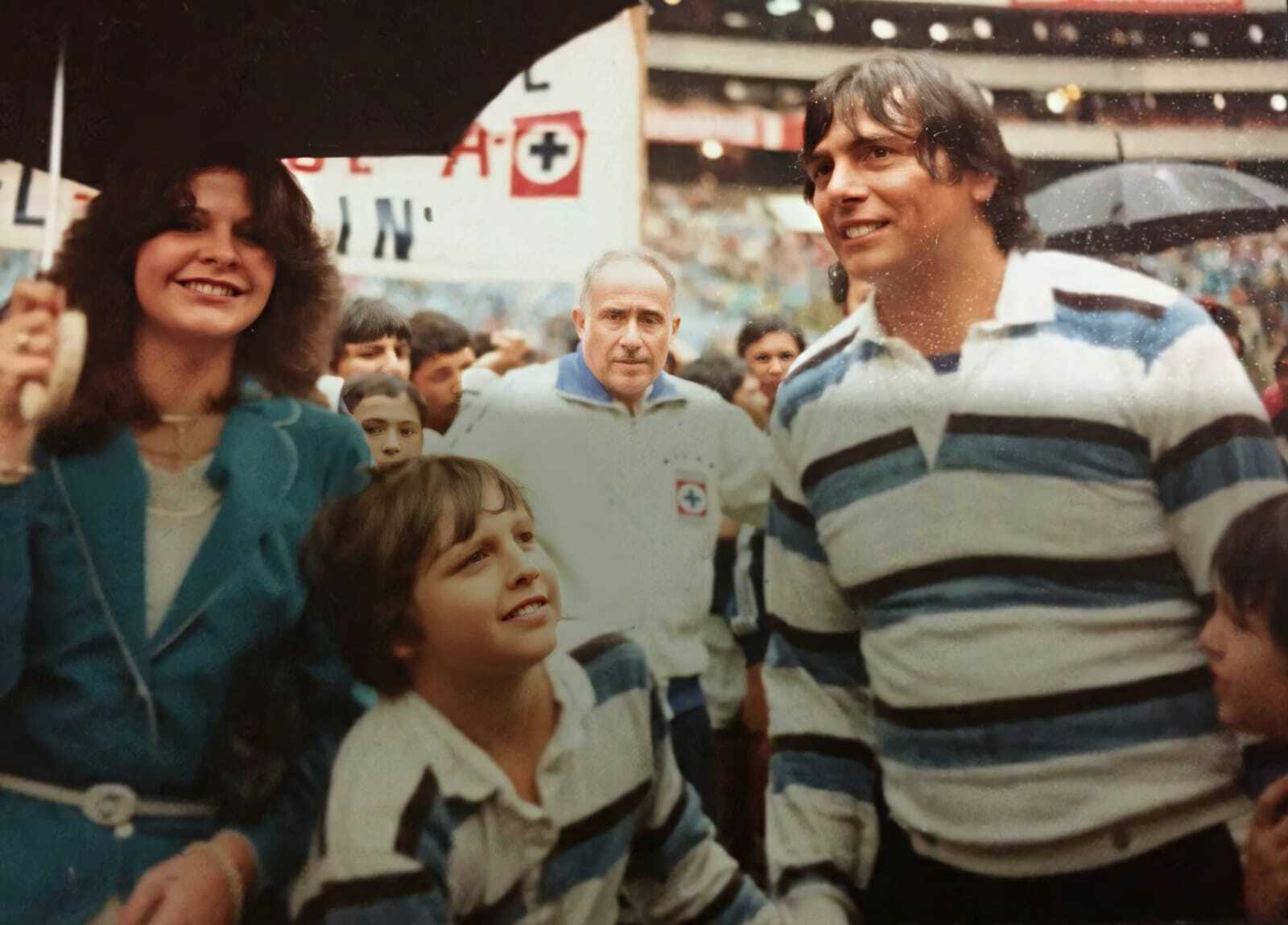
Miguel Marín's farewell match against Guadalajara, 6 June 1981.

On 6 June 1981, Marín played his farewell match for Cruz Azul against Guadalajara, shortly before the club, as defending champion, lost the 1980–81 final to Pumas UNAM. Cruz Azul won the first leg 1–0 at Estadio Azteca, but Pumas won the return leg 4–1 to take the title 4–2 on aggregate. Trelles remained as head coach for a further two seasons without winning another title.

Cruz Azul continued to qualify for the playoffs in most seasons during the 1980s and reached three further finals, losing all three. In 1986–87, the club won the first leg 2–1 at home to Guadalajara but lost the return leg 0–3 at Estadio Jalisco, finishing runners-up 4–2 on aggregate. The following season, Cruz Azul reached the final of the 1987–88 Copa México, the competition's first edition after a twelve-year hiatus, losing to Puebla on the away goals rule. In the 1988–89 final, Cruz Azul lost the first leg 2–3 at home to América and drew the return leg 2–2, finishing runners-up 5–4 on aggregate.

In 1988, Guillermo Héctor Álvarez Cuevas, the son of the late Guillermo Álvarez Macías, became general manager of Cooperativa La Cruz Azul and president of the club. Under his leadership, Cruz Azul signed striker Carlos Hermosillo in 1991. In 1993–94, Hermosillo finished as the league's top scorer with 27 goals.

In 1994–95, Cruz Azul finished third in the table and reached the final for the first time since 1989, eliminating Pumas UNAM in the quarter-finals and América 3–2 on aggregate in the semi-finals. In the final, Cruz Azul drew 1–1 with Necaxa in the first leg before losing the second 0–2, finishing runners-up 3–1 on aggregate. Hermosillo finished as the season's top scorer for a second consecutive year with 35 goals. Between the 1980–81 and 1994–95 finals, Cruz Azul lost all five finals it reached in league and cup competition, a run that left the club without a major title for 16 years. In 1995–96, Hermosillo finished as the league's top scorer for a third consecutive season with 26 goals. That year, Cruz Azul left Estadio Azteca, its home since 1971, and moved to the Estadio Azulgrana, which it renamed Estadio Azul.

=== 1996–2002: End of the drought and a Copa Libertadores final ===
On 20 July 1996, Cruz Azul ended its 16-year wait for a major title by winning the 1996 CONCACAF Champions' Cup in Guatemala City. Under manager Víctor Manuel Vucetich, the club topped the final group stage, defeating Seattle Sounders 11–0 in the group's final matchday to secure the title. That season, Cruz Azul also won the 1996–97 Copa México, defeating Toros Neza 2–0 at Estadio 10 de Diciembre.

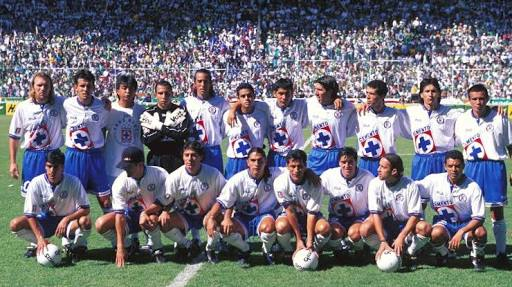
Cruz Azul before facing León in the second leg of the Invierno 1997 final.

In 1997, under new manager Luis Fernando Tena, Cruz Azul retained the CONCACAF title, defeating LA Galaxy in the final on 24 August, and later reached the final of the Invierno 1997 league tournament against León. Cruz Azul won the first leg 1–0 at Estadio Azul through a penalty from Benjamín Galindo on 4 December. In the return leg on 7 December, León equalised the aggregate score in regular time, sending the match to extra time. In the first period of extra time, León goalkeeper Ángel Comizzo fouled Carlos Hermosillo inside the area; referee Arturo Brizio awarded a penalty without sending off Comizzo, and Hermosillo, injured in the challenge, converted it to win the match by golden goal and give Cruz Azul its eighth league title, ending a 17-year wait for the league championship. The Copa México, CONCACAF and league titles won across 1996 and 1997 gave Cruz Azul a continental treble for the second time.

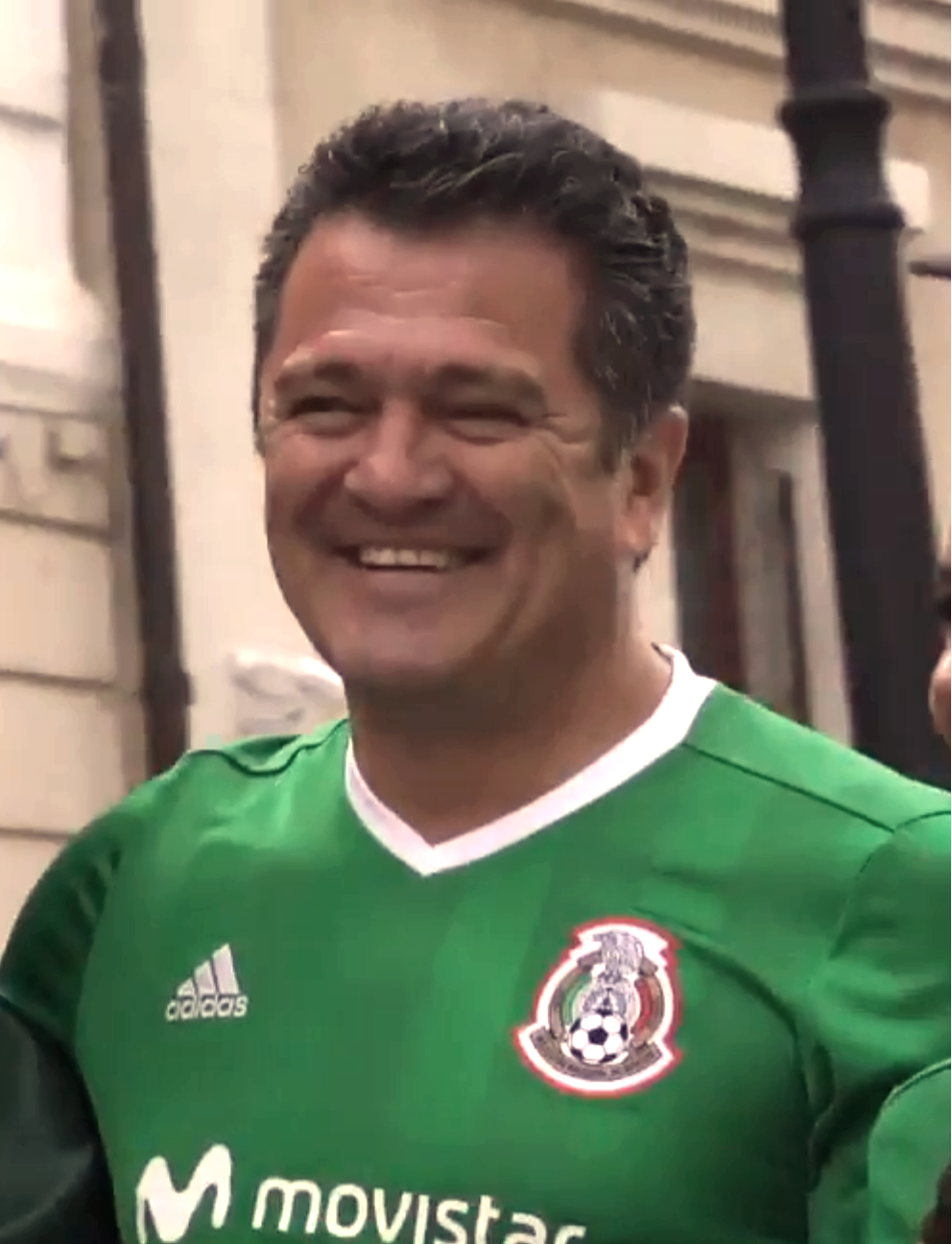
Carlos Hermosillo is Cruz Azul's all-time leading goalscorer with 198 goals.

Hermosillo left Cruz Azul in 1998 as the club's all-time leading goalscorer, having scored 198 goals in all competitions since joining in 1991. In the Invierno 1998, the first tournament after his departure, Cruz Azul had the league's best regular-season record, with 40 points from 17 matches, but was eliminated by Pumas UNAM 4–3 on aggregate in the quarter-finals. In the Verano 1999, the club eliminated Guadalajara in the quarter-finals but lost the semi-final to Atlas 6–0 on aggregate. In the Invierno 1999 tournament, Cruz Azul reached the final against Pachuca, seeking a ninth league title. After drawing the first leg 2–2, Cruz Azul lost the second leg 1–0 at Estadio Azul on 19 December 1999 to a golden goal in extra time, finishing runners-up 3–2 on aggregate.

Tena left Cruz Azul in 2000, and José Luis Trejo was appointed head coach as his replacement. Under Trejo, Cruz Azul qualified for the 2001 Copa Libertadores through the Copa Pre-Libertadores, a preliminary round involving two Mexican and two Venezuelan clubs, finishing first in its group ahead of Táchira, Italchacao and Atlante. In the main tournament, Cruz Azul again topped its group, finishing first in Group 7 with 13 points ahead of São Caetano, Defensor Sporting and Olmedo. Cruz Azul then eliminated Cerro Porteño 4–3 on aggregate in the round of 16, River Plate 3–0 in the quarter-finals and Rosario Central 5–3 in the semi-finals to reach the final against Boca Juniors. Cruz Azul lost the first leg 1–0 at Estadio Azteca but won the return leg 1–0 at La Bombonera, with Francisco Palencia levelling the aggregate score; Boca Juniors won the title on penalties. The result made Cruz Azul the first Mexican club to reach a Copa Libertadores final. Trejo remained in charge until the end of the Apertura 2002.

=== 2002–2013: International pursuits and runners-up ===
Cruz Azul returned to the Copa Libertadores in 2003, reaching the quarter-finals before losing to Brazilian club Santos. On 16 July 2005, Cruz Azul manager Rubén Omar Romano was abducted by five men after leaving a pre-season training session; the assailants blocked his car with two stolen vehicles, and a ransom note was later delivered to his family demanding $500,000. Assistant coach Isaac Mizrahi Smeke took over team duties during Romano's absence. After 65 days in captivity, Romano was rescued in a federal raid; authorities arrested seven people connected to the abduction, reportedly acting under the orders of convicted kidnapper José Luis Canchola. While Romano was still in captivity, Cruz Azul decided not to renew his contract beyond the Apertura 2005 tournament and offered the head coaching position to Mizrahi.

Between 2008 and 2013, Cruz Azul reached seven major finals — five domestic and two international — winning only one, a pattern that gave rise to the verb cruzazulear in Mexican sports journalism, meaning to lose a match despite holding a winning position. By 2020 the term had been added to the Royal Spanish Academy's Observatorio de palabras, a list of words not yet admitted to its dictionary.

Cruz Azul lost the Clausura 2008 final 3–2 on aggregate to Santos Laguna. Facing Toluca in the Apertura 2008 final, the club lost the first leg 2–0 but levelled the aggregate with a 2–0 win in the return leg, before losing the penalty shoot-out 7–6. Cruz Azul's 2008–09 CONCACAF Champions League campaign ended in the final, lost 2–0 on aggregate to Atlante. The Apertura 2009 final brought a 6–4 aggregate defeat to Monterrey. Against Pachuca in the 2009–10 CONCACAF Champions League final, Cruz Azul won the first leg 2–1 at home but lost the second 1–0, with Pachuca awarded the title on away goals after the aggregate finished tied 2–2.

In April 2012, the club's name was officially changed to Cruz Azul Fútbol Club, A.C. The following year, Cruz Azul won the Clausura 2013 Copa MX, defeating Atlante in the final. In the Clausura 2013 league final against América, Cruz Azul led 2–0 on aggregate in the second leg's closing minutes before América equalised with goals in the 89th and 93rd minutes, then won the title 4–2 on penalties.

=== 2014–2020: Continental and domestic titles, playoff struggles ===
On 23 April 2014, Cruz Azul won the 2013–14 CONCACAF Champions League, beating Toluca on away goals after a 1–1 draw at Nemesio Diez Stadium. It was the club's sixth CONCACAF title and first in 17 years, since 1997. The win qualified Cruz Azul for the 2014 FIFA Club World Cup, where the team finished fourth.

Cruz Azul then failed to qualify for the playoffs for six consecutive tournaments, from Apertura 2014 to Clausura 2017. The club returned to the playoffs in Apertura 2017 but was eliminated in the quarter-finals by América on aggregate after a goalless draw, América advancing on higher seeding. Manager Paco Jémez left at the end of that tournament. Pedro Caixinha was appointed as his replacement on 5 December 2017.

In Clausura 2018, Cruz Azul finished 12th and again missed the playoffs. On 7 May 2018, sporting director Eduardo de la Torre was replaced by Ricardo Peláez. For the Apertura 2018, after its lease on Estadio Azul ended and the stadium was slated for demolition, Cruz Azul returned to Estadio Azteca. Later that year, Caixinha led Cruz Azul to the Apertura 2018 Copa MX, defeating Monterrey 2–0 in the final. In the same tournament's league final, a rematch of the Clausura 2013 final, Cruz Azul drew the first leg 0–0 with América before losing the second 2–0.

On 14 July 2019, Caixinha led Cruz Azul to the 2019 Supercopa MX, defeating Necaxa 4–0 at Dignity Health Sports Park in Carson, California. Caixinha left the club on 2 September 2019, eight matches into the Apertura 2019, and Robert Siboldi was appointed on 6 September. Under Siboldi, Cruz Azul won the final of the inaugural 2019 Leagues Cup, a new tournament between Liga MX and Major League Soccer clubs, defeating Tigres UANL 2–1 on 18 September in Las Vegas. In the Clausura 2020 season, Cruz Azul led the table after ten matchdays when the tournament was suspended because of the COVID-19 pandemic; it was later declared void with no champion, and Cruz Azul and León were awarded Mexico's berths in the 2021 CONCACAF Champions League based on their standing at the time of suspension. That same month, club president Guillermo Álvarez Cuevas was investigated for alleged money laundering and illicit-source transactions, and on 30 July a federal judge issued an arrest warrant for Álvarez and several other cooperative officials.

=== 2020–present ===
At the start of the 2020–21 season, Álvarez Cuevas resigned as president of Cooperativa La Cruz Azul and the club on 1 August 2020, after 32 years in charge. Víctor Velázquez assumed control of the cooperative's governing councils on an interim basis. Subsequently, Cruz Azul finished fourth in the Guardianes 2020 regular phase with 29 points. In the quarter-finals, Cruz Azul beat Tigres UANL 3–1 away on 26 November, then lost the return leg 0–1 at Estadio Azteca on 28 November, advancing 3–2 on aggregate. In the semi-finals, Cruz Azul beat Pumas UNAM 4–0 in the first leg on 3 December but lost the return leg by the same scoreline on 6 December; with the aggregate tied 4–4, Pumas advanced to the final on their higher regular-season placing. Afterwards, Siboldi resigned on 11 December.

A display in the stands celebrating Cruz Azul's record-equalling run of 12 consecutive wins during the Guardianes 2021 tournament.

Cruz Azul appointed former player Juan Reynoso as head coach on 3 January 2021, ahead of the Guardianes 2021 tournament; Reynoso had been part of the club's squad for its last league title, in 1997. On 5 April 2021, a general assembly of the cooperative's members formally elected Velázquez president of its administrative council, with 99.79 per cent of the vote. After two opening defeats in the Guardianes 2021 regular season, Cruz Azul won 12 consecutive matches, equalling a Liga MX record; the club finished the regular phase as league leaders with 41 points from 17 matches. In the playoffs, Cruz Azul eliminated Toluca and Pachuca to reach the final against Santos Laguna. The club won the first leg 1–0 and drew the second 1–1 on 30 May 2021, taking the title 2–1 on aggregate and ending a 23-year wait for the league championship. Cruz Azul followed this by defeating León 2–1 in the 2021 Campeón de Campeones match on 18 July.

Cruz Azul's form declined in the following tournaments, and Reynoso was dismissed on 18 May 2022 after elimination in the Clausura 2022 quarter-finals. Diego Aguirre was appointed on 30 May 2022 and won the 2022 Supercopa de la Liga MX on penalties against Atlas, but was dismissed on 21 August after a 7–0 defeat to América. Over the next sixteen months, Cruz Azul changed head coach three more times: Raúl Gutiérrez, dismissed in February 2023; Ricardo Ferretti, dismissed that August; and Joaquín Moreno, who took over on an interim basis before being confirmed for the remainder of the Apertura 2023 tournament and later moving to the club's reserve and academy system. On 20 December 2023, Cruz Azul appointed Martín Anselmi as head coach. In 2024, Cruz Azul left Estadio Azteca, which closed for renovation ahead of the 2026 FIFA World Cup, and moved its home matches to Estadio Ciudad de los Deportes. Cruz Azul reached the Clausura 2024 final but lost 2–1 on aggregate to América, their sixth final between the two clubs, the most contested fixture in Liga MX history.

In the Apertura 2024, Cruz Azul set a Liga MX record for points in a 17-matchday tournament, finishing on 42, then eliminated Tijuana in the quarter-finals before losing to América in the semi-finals on a stoppage-time penalty. Ahead of the Clausura 2025 tournament, Cruz Azul announced that its home matches would move to Estadio Olímpico Universitario. On 24 January 2025, Anselmi left to join Portuguese club Porto without notifying Cruz Azul in advance, a departure the club considered a breach of contract and pursued through the Court of Arbitration for Sport. Vicente Sánchez was appointed interim manager the following day and ratified permanently on 23 February. Under Sánchez, Cruz Azul won a seventh CONCACAF Champions Cup, equalling the record held by América, defeating Vancouver Whitecaps FC 5–0 in the final on 1 June 2025 and qualifying for the 2025 FIFA Intercontinental Cup and the 2029 FIFA Club World Cup. Cruz Azul and Sánchez parted ways by mutual agreement on 6 June 2025.

For the 2025–26 season, Nicolás Larcamón was appointed head coach on 16 June 2025. At the start of the Clausura 2026, the club moved its home matches to Estadio Cuauhtémoc in Puebla after the UNAM declined to renew its agreement for Estadio Olímpico Universitario. Following a nine-match winless run, Larcamón was dismissed on 22 April 2026. Joel Huiqui, then manager of the club's under-21 squad, assumed interim charge for the final regular-season fixture and through the playoffs. After the renovation of Estadio Azteca, Cruz Azul returned to the stadium for the last matchday of the regular season and for its home playoff matches, except the first leg of the final, which it hosted at Estadio Ciudad de los Deportes. Cruz Azul eliminated Atlas and Guadalajara before beating Pumas UNAM 2–1 in the final to win a tenth league title.

At the start of the 2026–27 season, Huiqui was ratified as head coach on 8 July 2026. On 17 July 2026, the Liga MX confirmed that Cruz Azul would play its Apertura 2026 home matches at Estadio Azteca. On 25 July, Cruz Azul won the 2026 Campeón de Campeones, defeating Toluca 3–1 at Dignity Health Sports Park in Carson, California.

== Crest and colours ==
=== Crest ===
1927–1964

1964–1971

1971–1972

1972–1973

1973–1974

1974–1979

1979–1980

1980–1997

1997

1998–2021

2021–2022

2022–2025

2025–present

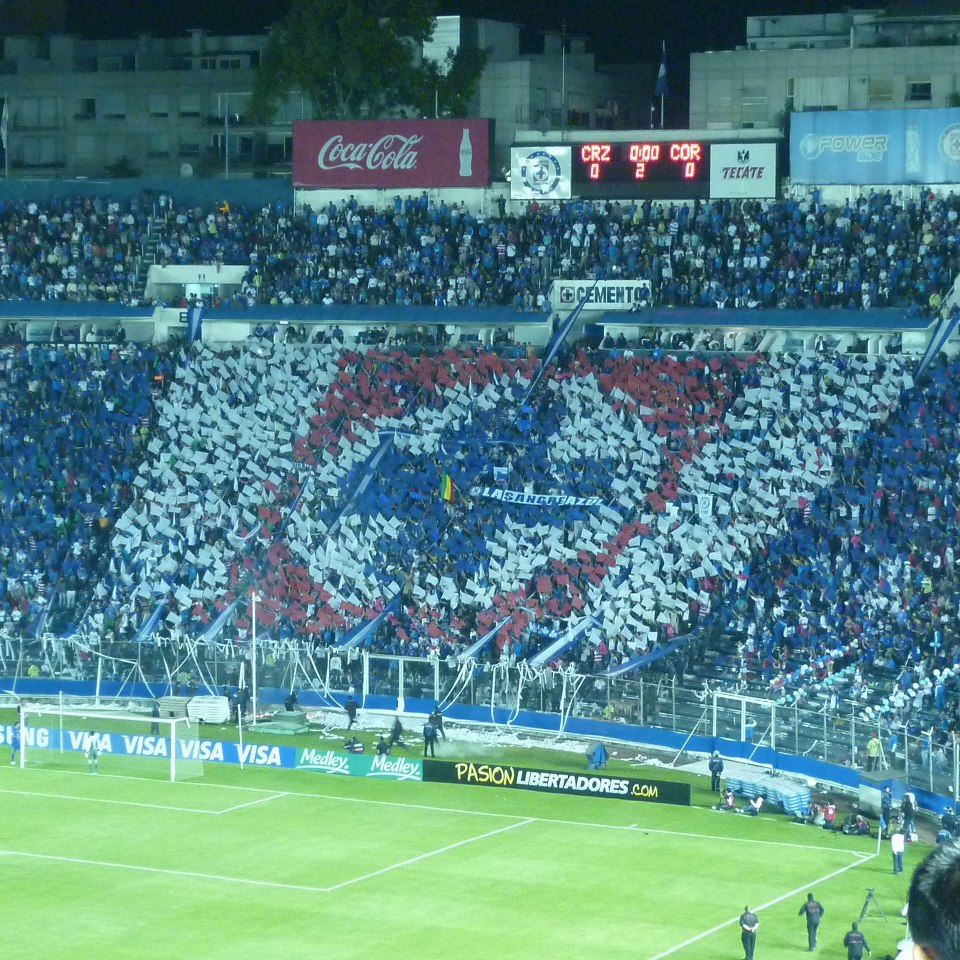
Cruz Azul fans display a tifo of the club's crest during the 2012 Copa Libertadores match against Corinthians.

The club's initial crest was a shield-shaped design, featuring the blue cross—a symbol linked to the club's parent company, Cooperativa La Cruz Azul. In 1964, the crest was modified to incorporate the club's full name, Club Deportivo Cruz Azul, within a new shield outline. The first major change came in 1971, when the design became a square shape. The following year, stars were introduced above the cross, beginning the tradition of adding a star for each league title.

In 1997, the crest underwent a significant redesign, becoming a fully circular emblem for the first time, and the word "Mexico" was added at the bottom of the outer ring. A year later, the club added an eighth star. The crest was modified in 2021 to commemorate the club's ninth league title, adding a ninth star around the emblem. In 2022, the club changed their name to Club de Futbol Cruz Azul, and all surrounding stars were removed. The most recent modification to the crest occurred in 2025, when the club introduced a slightly updated version of its crest, featuring subtle adjustments to the typography and proportions of the emblem.

=== Colours ===
The club's primary colours are blue, white, and red. These colours, along with the blue cross symbol, are traditionally linked to the Union Jack due to the cement company's original English founders, Henry Gibbon and Joseph Watson, in 1881. The club's first home kit, worn from 1927 to 1932, consisted of a white shirt with blue vertical stripes, and in 1932 the club wore a full white kit with a dark blue collar. Cruz Azul have worn a blue home shirt since the 1940s: between 1943 and 1944 the club adopted a plain royal blue shirt with white shorts and blue socks. Following the team's professionalisation in the 1960s, the shade of blue became a lighter sky blue, which earned the club its popular nickname, Los Celestes (The Sky Blues). By 1968, Cruz Azul had returned to a full royal blue kit, and a year later a white collar and sleeve trim were added. The design remained largely unchanged until the early 2000s, when the club began to adopt a sky blue tone once again. Throughout the 2010s, the club alternated between royal and sky blue kits. In the 2021–22 season, Cruz Azul wore a royal blue kit with navy blue stripes in place of the usual white trim. Cruz Azul's traditional away colours are all white, often paired with blue shorts.

==== Kit suppliers and shirt sponsors ====
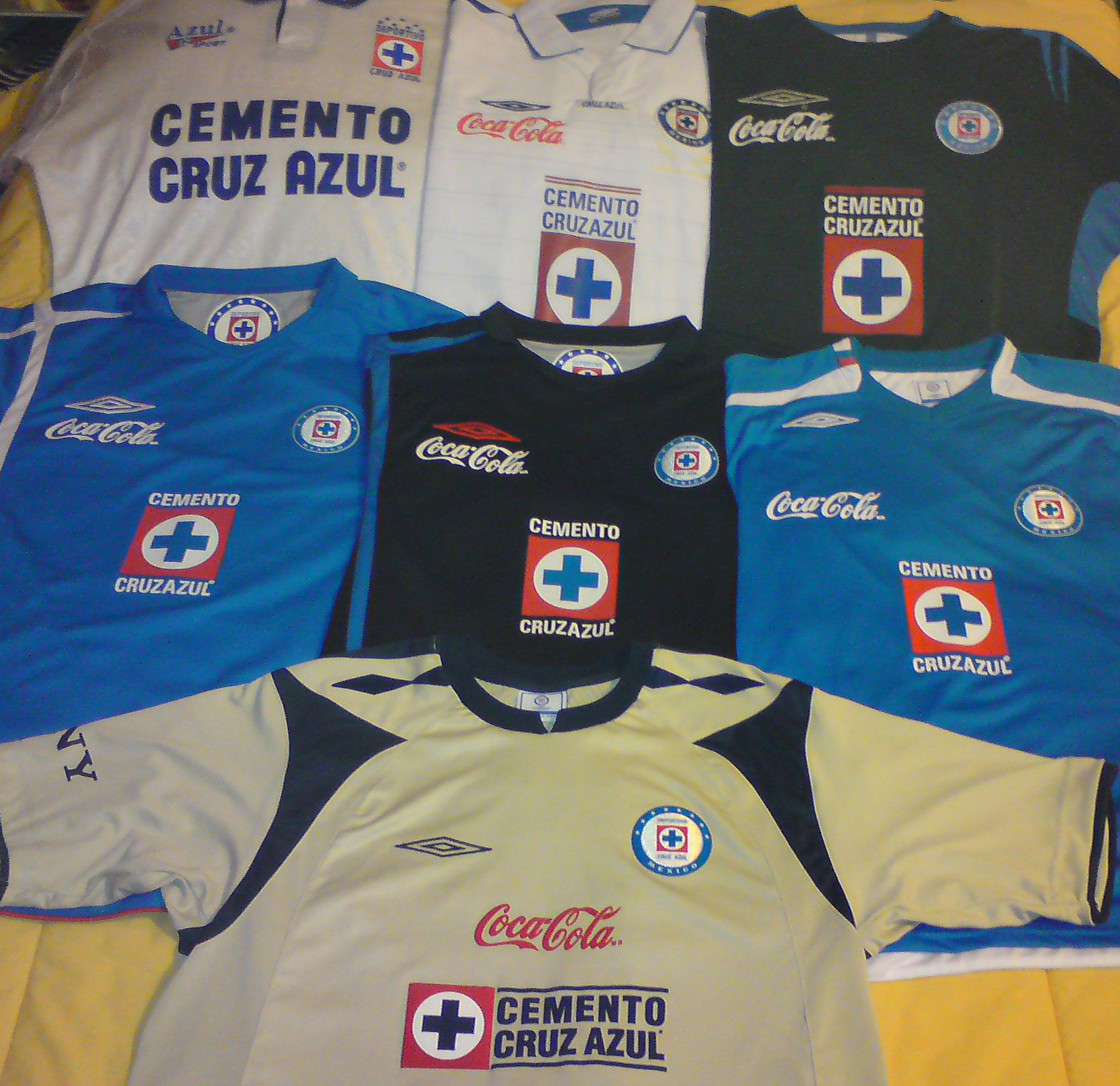
Cruz Azul kits from the 1990s and 2000s.

Cruz Azul's kits were made by the club's own brand, Azul Sport, from 1992 to 1996. Fila took over in 1996 and made the kits the club wore when it won its eighth league title in the Invierno 1997 and in the 2001 Copa Libertadores final. Umbro then supplied the club from 2002 to 2014, followed by Under Armour from 2014 to 2018 and the Spanish company Joma from 2019 to 2023. Since the Apertura 2023, the club's kits have been made by Pirma. In October 2025, the club extended the agreement for the 2026–27 season.

The logo of Azul Sport, the club's own kit brand from 1992 to 1996.

Advertising first appeared on Cruz Azul's shirts in 1992. The club's main shirt sponsor has been Cemento Cruz Azul, the cement brand of its parent company, Cooperativa La Cruz Azul. For much of its history the club kept relatively few sponsors on its shirt; from 2025, the Greek online betting company Novibet took a place on the front of the shirt, in a deal reported to be worth US$7 million a year, one of the most valuable in Liga MX.

Period	Kit manufacturer	Shirt main sponsor	Other kit sponsor(s)
1992–1996	Azul Sport	Cemento Cruz Azul	None
1996–1998	Fila	Cemento Cruz Azul	Lada (back shirt)
1998–2001	Fila	Cemento Cruz Azul	Pepsi (back shirt and left sleeve) and Telmex (short)
2002–2004	Umbro	Cemento Cruz Azul	Pepsi (back shirt and left sleeve) and Telmex (short)
2004–2008	Umbro	Cemento Cruz Azul	Coca-Cola (front shirt) and Telcel (back shirt)
2008–2009	Umbro	Cemento Cruz Azul	Coca-Cola (front shirt), Telcel (back shirt) and Sony (right sleeve)
2009–2010	Umbro	Cemento Cruz Azul	Powerade (front shirt), Telcel (back shirt) and Sony (right sleeve)
2010–2011	Umbro	Cemento Cruz Azul	Coca-Cola (front shirt) and Telcel (back shirt)
2011–2013	Umbro	Cemento Cruz Azul	Coca-Cola (front shirt), Telcel (back shirt), Tecate (back shirt) and Volaris (right sleeve)
2013–2014	Umbro	Cemento Cruz Azul	Coca-Cola (front shirt), Telcel (back shirt), Tecate (back shirt) and Scotiabank (left sleeve)
2014–2015	Under Armour	Cemento Cruz Azul	Telcel (back shirt), Tecate (back shirt) and Scotiabank (left sleeve)
2015–2017	Under Armour	Cemento Cruz Azul	Boing! (front shirt), Telcel (back shirt), Tecate (back shirt) and Scotiabank (left sleeve)
2017–2018	Under Armour	Cemento Cruz Azul	Telcel (back shirt), Tecate (back shirt) and Scotiabank (left sleeve)
2018	Under Armour	Cemento Cruz Azul	Caliente (back shirt)
2019–2023	Joma	Cemento Cruz Azul	Caliente (back shirt)
2023–2024	Pirma	Cemento Cruz Azul	Caliente (back shirt)
2024	Pirma	Cemento Cruz Azul	Caliente (back shirt) and Cemix (back shirt)
2025	Pirma	Cemento Cruz Azul	Caliente (back shirt), Cemix (back shirt) and Bankaool (left sleeve)
2025–	Pirma	Cemento Cruz Azul	Novibet (front shirt), Nikko Auto-Parts (front shirt), Cemix (back shirt) and Bankaool (left sleeve)

=== Nicknames ===
Throughout its history, Cruz Azul has been given a number of nicknames. The oldest is Cementeros (Cement workers), which derives from the club's origins at the Cooperativa La Cruz Azul, whose employees formed the original team. Los Celestes (the Sky blues) came from the lighter shade of blue that the club adopted on its shirts in the 1960s. During its early years in Jasso the club also became known as Liebres (Hares), after the animals that were a common sight around its former home, the Estadio 10 de Diciembre, and after the cement company's advertising, which featured a running hare alongside a slogan about how quickly its product set. Supporters associated the animal with a side known for its speed, and one of them began attending matches in a hare costume, first white and later blue, a figure that newspaper cartoonists went on to use in their depictions of the club. The hare was eventually adopted as the club's mascot and was named Blu in 2013 through a vote held among supporters on Twitter.

The club's best-known nickname is La Máquina (the Machine), which became attached to the Cruz Azul team of the late 1960s and 1970s, a period in which the club won seven league titles. One explanation holds that the name arose from the forceful, direct football the team played in those years, and that it gained currency because it also evoked the railway once used by workers at the cement plant in Jasso. That plant accounts for the second element of the longer form La Máquina Cementera. A second explanation attributes the name to the chronicler Ángel Fernández Rugama, who is said to have used it before it was taken up by supporters.

== Stadium ==
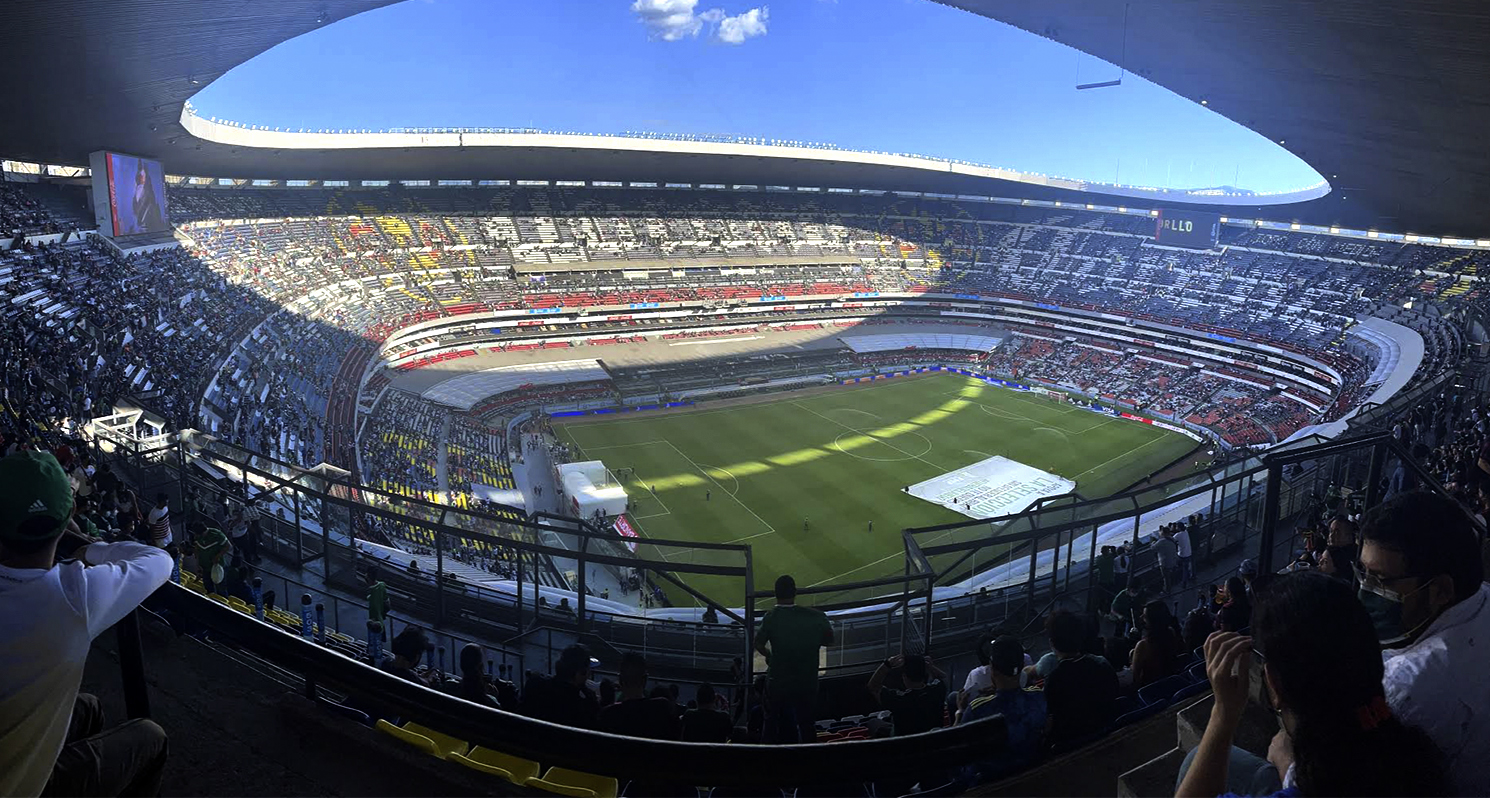
Estadio Azteca, current home of Cruz Azul.

Cruz Azul played its first top-flight seasons at the Estadio 10 de Diciembre in Jasso, Hidalgo, from 1964 to 1971, winning its first two league titles there in the 1968–69 and 1970 seasons. The stadium, since renamed Estadio Refundación, became the home ground of the affiliate club Cruz Azul Hidalgo in 2026.

Seeking a wider national following, Cruz Azul left Hidalgo in 1971 and moved to the Estadio Azteca in Mexico City, where it spent the next 25 years and won five league titles, along with several domestic and international cup competitions. In 1996, the club moved to the Estadio Ciudad de los Deportes in the Benito Juárez borough, which was renamed Estadio Azul when Cruz Azul took it over on 10 August. Its first match there, on the same day, was a 3–0 win over Toros Neza. The ground was the club's home for 22 years, during which it reached seven league finals and won one of them, in 1997. Cruz Azul hosted River Plate in the quarter-finals of the 2001 Copa Libertadores at the Estadio Azteca, where the attendance was 114,500. Cruz Azul left the Estadio Azul after its final match there on 21 April 2018, a 2–0 win over Morelia, as the site was expected to be demolished to make way for a commercial development; the demolition did not take place.

The club returned to the Estadio Azteca for the Apertura 2018, beating Puebla 3–0 in its first home match back at the ground, and won its ninth league title there in 2021. Its last home match of this period was a 2–1 defeat by Puebla on 12 November 2023, after which the stadium closed for redevelopment ahead of the 2026 FIFA World Cup. That closure began a period of temporary venues. In 2024, Cruz Azul returned to its former home in Benito Juárez, by then renamed the Estadio Ciudad de los Deportes. On 2 November that year, during a home match against Santos Laguna, the borough authorities ordered the venue closed for breaching civil protection requirements; the seals were lifted five days later. After these difficulties, the club agreed a deal with UNAM to play at the Estadio Olímpico Universitario for 2025, paying 9.2 million pesos for its seven home league matches in the Clausura 2025, and went unbeaten at the ground during its year there.

On 6 January 2026, UNAM informed the club that the agreement would not be renewed, citing logistical constraints. Liga MX then authorised Cruz Azul to play the Clausura 2026 at the Estadio Cuauhtémoc in Puebla. After the redeveloped Estadio Azteca reopened in March 2026, by then renamed the Estadio Banorte under a sponsorship agreement, the club was authorised to stage the last round of the regular season there, against Necaxa on 26 April. Its home legs in the quarter-finals and semi-finals were also played at the ground. With the Estadio Banorte handed over to FIFA for the World Cup, the first leg of the final was played at the Estadio Ciudad de los Deportes on 21 May; Cruz Azul won its tenth league title three days later in the second leg at the Estadio Olímpico Universitario. The club returned to the Estadio Banorte for the Apertura 2026 after a period of uncertainty over its venue was resolved by an agreement with the stadium's operators; its first home match of the season was against Puebla on 21 July 2026.

Cruz Azul has never owned a stadium in Mexico City. A first design for one, known as the Domo Azul, was presented to the club's leadership in 1996 by the architect Rafael Villegas-Guillot, who proposed a domed ground for 30,000 spectators, expandable to 50,000, at the Magdalena Mixhuca sports complex; the club had sought a home of its own after disputes with the owners of the Estadio Azteca, who had sold advertising at its matches to a rival cement company, but the project was judged too costly and the club rented the ground that became the Estadio Azul instead. A proposal to roof the Estadio Azul followed in 2003, but the cost of working on a ground owned by the Cosío family led the club to limit itself to repainting the stadium and improving its entrances. In October 2016, it was reported that the club had reached an agreement with the Mexico City government to build a stadium on the site of the Velódromo Olímpico in the Magdalena Mixhuca, to be finished by mid-2018, when its lease at the Estadio Azul was due to expire. The project was suspended around the 2018 elections and the subsequent change of city administration, with four sites—the Velódromo, Iztapalapa, Xochimilco and Santa Fe—still under consideration. Planning for a new stadium resumed under Víctor Velázquez, president of Cooperativa La Cruz Azul, who said in October 2024 that five or six possible sites had been identified, and in April 2026 that funding was in place, estimating the cost at between US$250 million and US$300 million, with a capacity of 40,000 to 45,000 spectators and a building programme of two and a half to three years. As of October 2026, no site had been officially confirmed.

The club's training facilities, Instalaciones La Noria, are located in La Noria, in the borough of Xochimilco in southern Mexico City. The site was bought in 1986 and the complex opened on 10 October 1990, replacing the Seminario Menor de Acoxpa, which the club had rented for its training sessions. The complex was built to an ecological design and covers 46,600 m^{2} (502,000 sq ft), including 8,500 m^{2} (91,000 sq ft) of buildings. It has three pitches, two of grass and one artificial; a hybrid surface was laid on the main pitch in 2018. La Noria is also used by the club's youth teams.

== Support ==
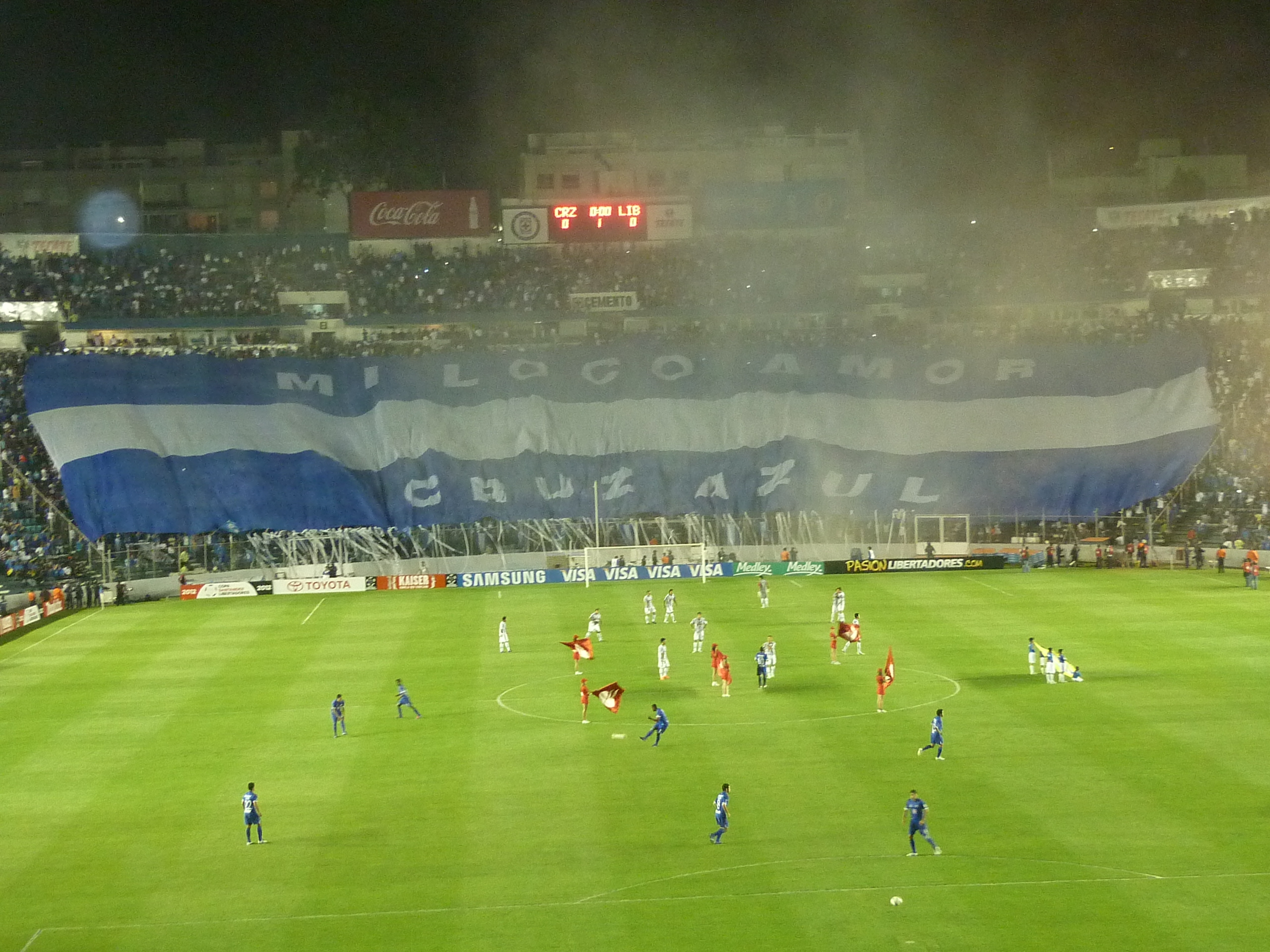
Cruz Azul supporters at Estadio Azul against Libertad in 2012.

According to Consulta Mitofsky's 2025 national survey, Cruz Azul have the third-largest fan base in Mexico, with 14.6 per cent of support, behind América and Guadalajara. A survey by El Financiero, conducted between November 2024 and March 2025, also placed the club third, with 17 per cent, ahead of Pumas UNAM; it found that Cruz Azul's support had the highest proportion of men and the oldest average age among the clubs surveyed. Founded as a team of workers from the Cooperativa La Cruz Azul cement factory, the club built a wider following after its promotion to the Primera División in 1964. Its support grew rapidly in the 1970s, when Cruz Azul won six league titles and became the most fashionable team in Mexican football, establishing itself as one of the most widely supported clubs in the country.

Cruz Azul went 23 years without a league title between the Invierno 1997 and the Guardianes 2021, a drought popularly attributed to the "Cruz Azul curse". It included six lost finals and several late play-off collapses. The run gave rise to the colloquial Mexican Spanish verb cruzazulear, meaning to throw away a winning position at the decisive moment. It ended on 30 May 2021, when Cruz Azul beat Santos Laguna 2–1 on aggregate in the Guardianes 2021 final.

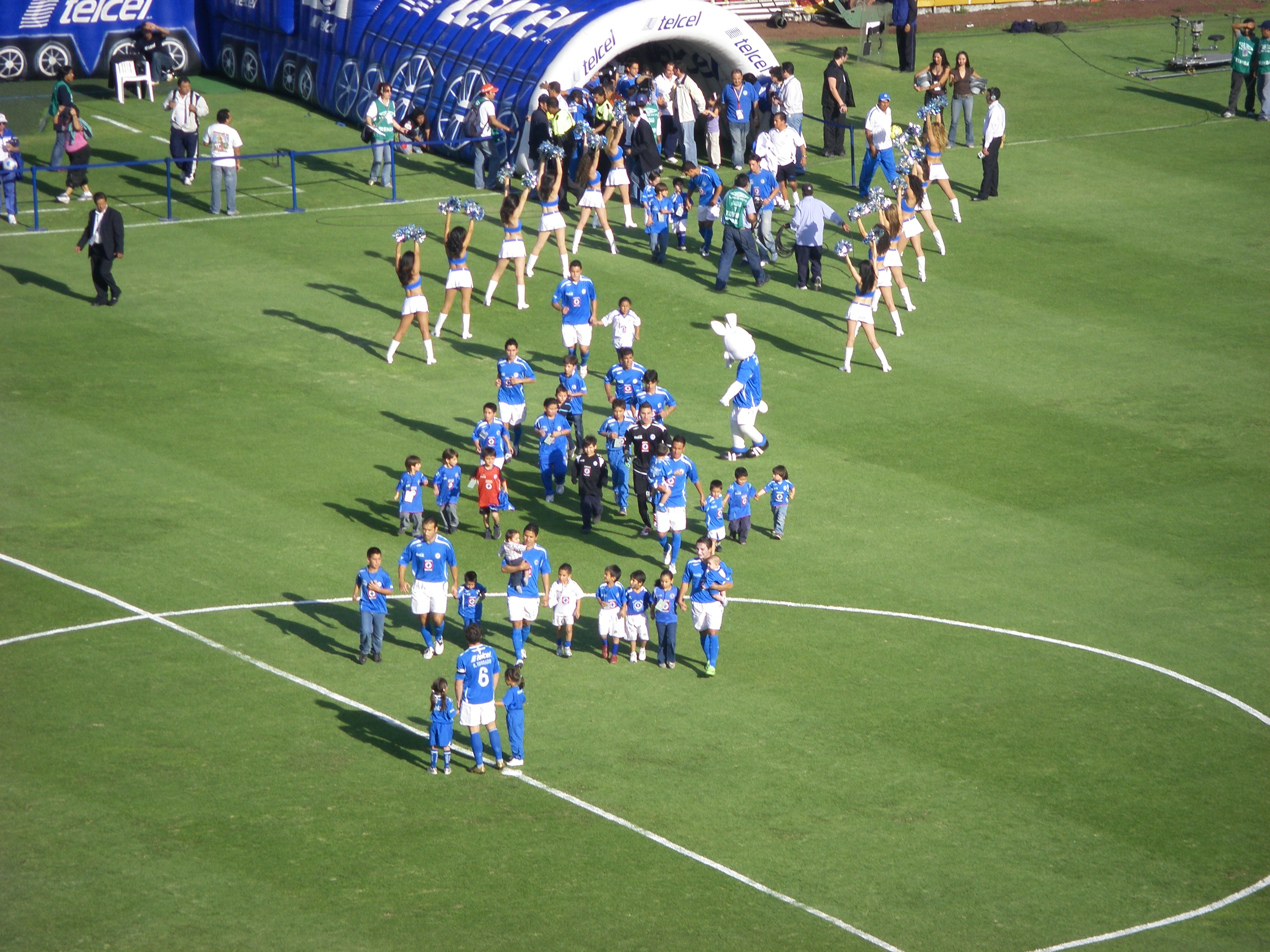
Players entering the pitch through a tunnel formed by Las Celestes, before the match against Atlante on 28 February 2009.

From 2004 the club had its own official cheerleading squad, Las Celestes, who performed at half-time during home matches at the Estadio Azul. In 2016 they were replaced by a new squad, Las de Azul, which performed at the club's home matches until 2020.

The club's main organised supporters' group is La Sangre Azul, founded in January 2001 and modelled on South American barras, with drums, flags and choreographed displays. Its relationship with the club's board was often strained. After violent incidents, including one in March 2015 in which members forced their way into the club's training ground, La Noria, to confront the board, the group lost the club's recognition. The club's new administration recognised the group again in May 2021, and from January 2022 allowed it to occupy the lower end stand at Estadio Azteca with its instruments, after years of supporting the team from the upper tier without official status. In April 2025 the group returned to La Noria for the first time in seven years, joined by club president Víctor Velázquez and sporting director Iván Alonso, before the CONCACAF Champions Cup quarter-final against América.

== Rivalries ==
=== Clásico Joven ===
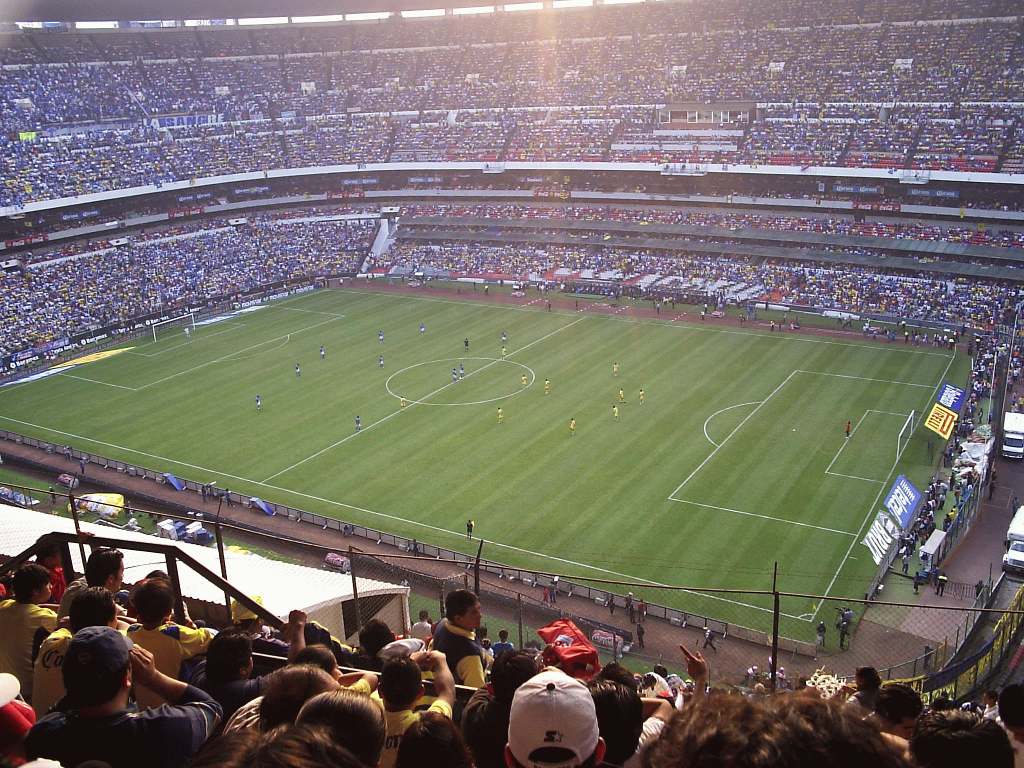
A Clásico Joven match between América and Cruz Azul at Estadio Azteca in 2005.

Cruz Azul's biggest rival is América, with their encounters are famously known as the Clásico Joven (lit. 'Young Classic'). The rivalry began in the early 1970s, a period during which both clubs were dominant in Mexican football and often contested league finals. Their first major final meeting came in the 1971–72 season, which Cruz Azul won 4–1, solidifying the rivalry's importance on the national stage. The intensity of the rivalry grew during the 1980s and 1990s, with several highly competitive league and playoff matches. The rivalry regained prominence during the Clausura 2013 finals, when América staged a dramatic comeback to equalize on aggregate in stoppage time before defeating Cruz Azul on penalties, a match often cited as one of the most memorable in Liga MX history. As of 2025, the Clásico Joven is the fixture with the most finals contested between two clubs in Mexican football, with a total of seven championship matchups.

Culturally, the rivalry is rooted in social and institutional contrasts. América is often associated with wealth and establishment due to its ownership by media conglomerate Televisa, while Cruz Azul is historically linked to the working class, stemming from its roots as a team founded by cement company Cooperativa La Cruz Azul. This contrast is reflected in the nickname Los Albañiles (lit. 'bricklayers'), used for Cruz Azul and its supporters. In addition to these social contrasts, several players and coaches have represented both sides over the years, further intensifying the rivalry. Notably, Raúl Cárdenas managed both clubs during the 1970s, while Carlos Hermosillo remains the top scorer in Clásico Joven history, scoring 15 goals in total—seven with América and eight with Cruz Azul. The rivalry remains one of the most anticipated fixtures in Mexican football, regularly drawing large attendances and national media coverage. Matches between the two are played in Mexico City, with both clubs sharing Estadio Azteca for much of their history, adding to the derby-like atmosphere of their clashes. As of May 2026, the two clubs have met 205 times in total matches, with América holding 74 wins, 62 victories for Cruz Azul, and 69 matches ending in draws.

=== Clásico Hidalguense ===
Cruz Azul maintains a historic rivalry with Pachuca, known as the Clásico Hidalguense (lit. 'Hidalgo Classic'). The rivalry is rooted in their shared geographical origins in the state of Hidalgo; Cruz Azul was founded in the town of Jasso (now part of the municipality of Tula de Allende) before the team's relocation to Mexico City on 1971. The first top-flight encounter between the clubs occurred during the 1967–68 season, where Cruz Azul secured a 1–0 victory as the away team, marking the beginning of the rivalry on the national stage. However, the rivalry was altered first by Cruz Azul's relocation to Mexico City in 1971, which diminished its local intensity, and then by Pachuca's relegation in 1973, which began a long hiatus lasting nearly two decades. Despite this, the fixture has produced several significant encounters since its revival in the modern era.

One of the rivalry's most significant historical matches occurred during the México 1970 tournament. In a decisive match where the league title was on the line, Cruz Azul defeated Pachuca 2–0 to secure their second championship. In the modern era, the most notable clash between the two clubs occurred in the Invierno 1999 tournament. In a dramatic series, Pachuca defeated Cruz Azul with a golden goal in extra-time to claim their first-ever league championship, cementing a pivotal moment in the rivalry's history. The rivalry extended to a continental stage in the CONCACAF Champions League final, which Pachuca won on away goals after a 2–2 aggregate score to claim their fourth continental title. In the semi-finals of the Guardianes 2021 tournament, a 1–0 aggregate victory for Cruz Azul propelled them to the final, which they would win to end their 23-year league title drought.

== Personnel ==
=== Coaching staff ===
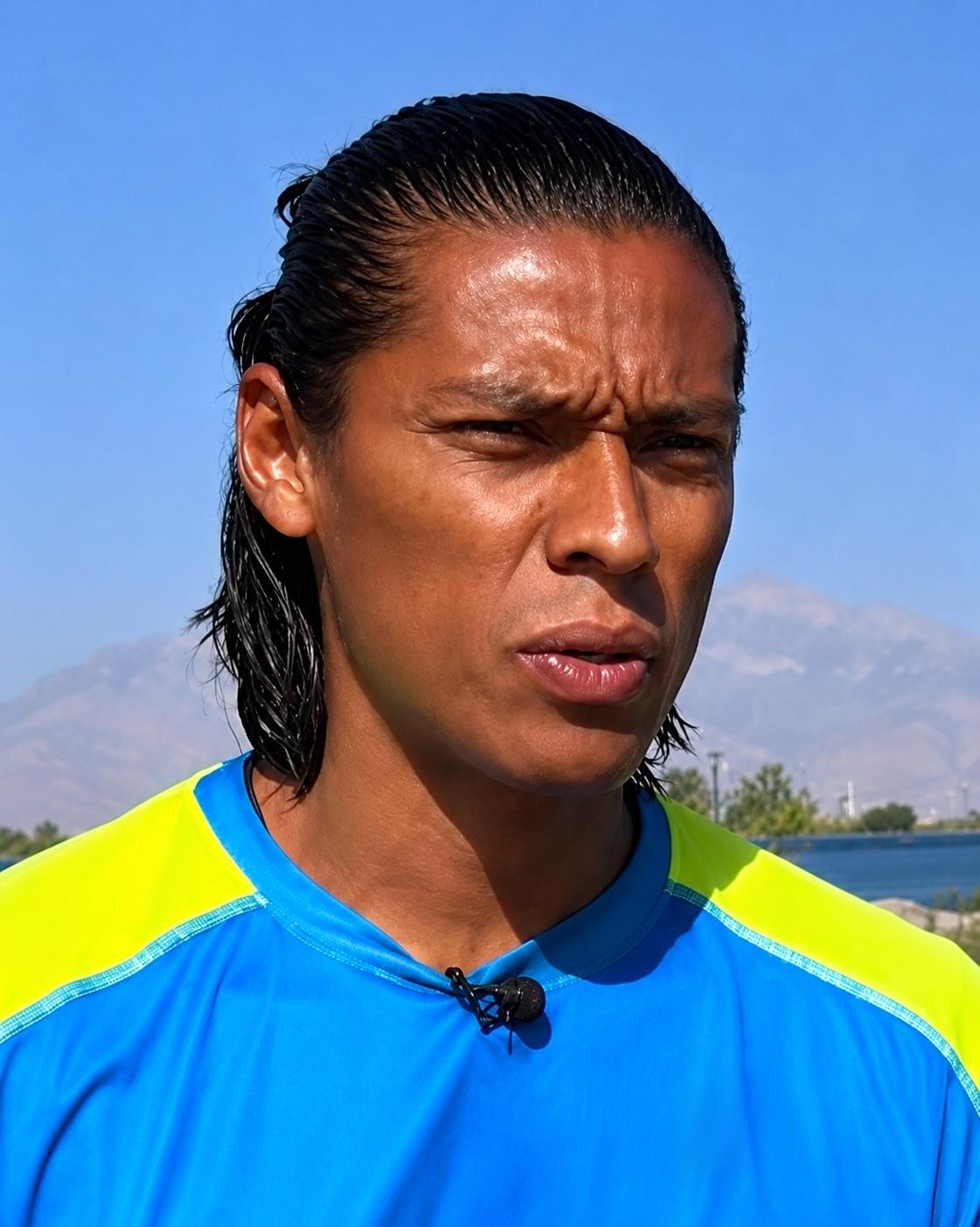
Joel Huiqui is the current head coach of Cruz Azul.

Position	Staff
Head coach	(Mexico) Joel Huiqui
Assistant coaches	(Mexico) Juan José Martínez
Assistant coaches	(Argentina) Facundo Oreja
Assistant coaches	(Portugal) Sergio Pinto
Goalkeeper coach	(Uruguay) Carlos Nicola
Fitness coaches	(Uruguay) Diego Bottaioli
Fitness coaches	(Mexico) Jorge Martínez
Fitness coaches	(Mexico) Fernando Ramos
Physiotherapists	(Mexico) Paolo Arriaga
Physiotherapists	(Mexico) José Morales
Team doctors	(Mexico) Antonio Acevedo
Team doctors	(Mexico) Juan Pérez

Source: Liga MX Cruz Azul

=== Management ===
Position	Staff
President	(Mexico) Víctor Velázquez
Administrative director	(Mexico) Antonio Reynoso
Director of football	(Uruguay) Iván Alonso
Coordinator of football	(Uruguay) Mathías Cardaccio
Director of sports science	(Uruguay) Andrés Payssé
Director of academy	(Mexico) Emmanuel González

Source: Cruz Azul Récord

== Players ==
=== First-team squad ===
As of 10 September 2026

Note: Flags indicate national team as defined under FIFA eligibility rules; some limited exceptions apply. Players may hold more than one non-FIFA nationality.

No.	Pos.	Nation	Player
1	GK	MEX	Andrés Gudiño
2	DF	MEX	Alan Mozo (on loan from Guadalajara)
3	DF	MEX	Omar Campos
4	DF	COL	Willer Ditta
5	DF	MEX	Jesús Orozco
6	MF	MEX	Érik Lira (captain)
7	FW	ARG	Nicolás Ibáñez
8	MF	ARG	Agustín Palavecino
10	MF	MEX	Andrés Montaño
11	FW	NGR	Christian Ebere
12	DF	MEX	Alán Montes
13	GK	MEX	Ricardo Rodríguez
14	FW	COL	Juan José Calero
15	DF	USA	Ralph Orquin
16	MF	MEX	Jeremy Márquez

No.	Pos.	Nation	Player
17	MF	MEX	Amaury García
18	MF	ARG	Luka Romero
19	MF	MEX	Carlos Rodríguez (vice-captain)
20	MF	ARG	José Paradela
21	FW	URU	Gabriel Fernández
22	DF	MEX	Jorge Rodarte
23	GK	COL	Kevin Mier
25	MF	MEX	Fernando Sámano
27	FW	MEX	Bryan Gamboa
28	DF	MEX	Raymundo Rubio
29	MF	ARG	Carlos Rotondi
30	GK	MEX	Emmanuel Ochoa
32	MF	MEX	Cristian Jiménez
33	DF	ARG	Gonzalo Piovi

=== Out on loan ===
Note: Flags indicate national team as defined under FIFA eligibility rules; some limited exceptions apply. Players may hold more than one non-FIFA nationality.

No.	Pos.	Nation	Player
—	DF	MEX	Mauro Zaleta (at Necaxa)

=== Reserves and Academy ===
Players with at least one first-team appearance for Cruz Azul.

Note: Flags indicate national team as defined under FIFA eligibility rules; some limited exceptions apply. Players may hold more than one non-FIFA nationality.

No.	Pos.	Nation	Player
42	DF	MEX	Jorge García
49	DF	MEX	Josué Díaz
55	MF	MEX	Rogelio González
57	MF	MEX	Diego Valdéz
58	MF	MEX	Emmanuel Sánchez
60	MF	MEX	Ariel Castro
66	DF	VEN	Javier Suárez

No.	Pos.	Nation	Player
67	DF	MEX	Jaziel Mendoza
68	MF	MEX	Christian Valdivia
70	DF	MEX	Iván Silva
194	MF	MEX	Amaury Morales
213	MF	MEX	Jeyson Durán
214	FW	MEX	Mateo Levy
258	FW	MEX	Emiliano Castañeda

==== Current teams ====
- Cruz Azul Hidalgo
- Cruz Azul Lagunas

==== Defunct teams ====
- Cruz Azul Oaxaca
- Cruz Azul Jasso
- Cruz Azul Premier
- Cruz Azul Dublán

== Presidents ==
Cruz Azul is owned and operated by the Cooperativa La Cruz Azul, a worker cooperative. Unlike most football clubs, the club's president is also the president of the cooperative's board of administration, elected by an assembly of cooperative members. The club has had five presidents throughout its history, with Guillermo Álvarez Cuevas being the longest-serving, having held the position from 1988 to 2020. Guillermo Álvarez Macías is the most successful president in the club's history, having won 13 titles during his tenure from 1953 to 1976. The current president is Víctor Velázquez, who assumed the role in August 2020 following the resignation of Álvarez Cuevas amid legal proceedings against him.

Below is the presidential history of Cruz Azul since the founding of the cooperative.

Name	From	To	Years (Note: All dates and years are approximate, as exact dates are not fully documented.)
(Mexico) Arcadio Hernández Falcón	1931	1953	22 years
(Mexico) Guillermo Álvarez Macías	1953	1976	23 years
(Mexico) Joel Luis Becerril Benítez	1978	1988	10 years
(Mexico) Guillermo Álvarez Cuevas	1988	2020	32 years
(Mexico) Víctor Velázquez	2020	present	6 years

== Honours ==
Cruz Azul is one of the most successful clubs in Mexican football, and its ten league titles are the fourth-highest total in the competition's history. The club won its first major title in the 1968–69 season, when it won the Mexican Primera División five years after being promoted. It won six league titles during the 1970s, a period in which it became known as La Máquina (The Machine). Since the league adopted a short-tournament format in 1996, the club has won three further league titles. Domestically, Cruz Azul has also won the Copa MX and the Campeón de Campeones four times each, the Supercopa MX in 2019 and the Supercopa de la Liga MX in 2022.

In international football, Cruz Azul is among the most successful clubs in North America, having won the CONCACAF Champions Cup (CONCACAF's premier club competition) a joint-record seven times. Its 1969 and 1997 titles formed part of continental trebles alongside the league and the Copa México. In 2001, Cruz Azul became the first Mexican club to reach the final of the Copa Libertadores. The club also won the inaugural Leagues Cup in 2019, finished as runner-up in the 1971 Copa Interamericana, and finished fourth at the 2014 FIFA Club World Cup.

Domestic
Type	Competition	Titles	Seasons	Runners-up	Source
Top level FMF	Liga MX	10	1968–69, Mex–1970, 1971–72, 1972–73, 1973–74, 1978–79, 1979–80, Inv–1997, Guard–2021, Cla–2026	1969–70, 1980–81, 1986–87, 1988–89, 1994–95, Inv–1999, Cla–2008, Ape–2008, Ape–2009, Cla–2013, Ape–2018, Cla–2024	
Top level FMF	Copa MX	4	1968–69, 1996–97, Cla–2013, Ape–2018	1973–74, 1987–88	
Top level FMF	Campeón de Campeones	4	1969, 1974, 2021, 2026	1972	
Top level FMF	Supercopa MX	1^{s}	2019	—	
Top level FMF	Supercopa de la Liga MX	1^{s}	2022	—	
Lower levels FMF	Segunda División	1	1963–64	—	
International
Type	Competition	Titles	Seasons	Runners-up	Source
Intercontinental FIFA	FIFA Derby of the Americas	0	—	2025	
Intercontinental CONCACAF CONMEBOL	Copa Interamericana	0	—	1971	
Continental CONCACAF	CONCACAF Champions Cup	7^{s}	1969, 1970, 1971, 1996, 1997, 2013–14, 2025	2008–09, 2009–10	
Continental CONMEBOL	CONMEBOL Libertadores	0	—	2001	
Regional North America USSF–FMF	Leagues Cup	1^{s}	2019	—	
Regional North America USSF–FMF	Campeones Cup	0	—	2021, 2026	

Notes

- record
- ^{s} shared record

=== Doubles and trebles ===
- Doubles: (Note: Doubles won as part of a treble, such as the league and CONCACAF Champions' Cup double of 1997, are not included in the Doubles section.)
  - League and CONCACAF Champions' Cup (2): 1970, 1971–72
  - League and Campeón de Campeones (1): 1973–74
- Trebles:
  - League, Copa México and CONCACAF Champions' Cup (2): 1969, 1997

=== Friendly ===
- Torneo Almería: 1979
- Torneo Burgos: 1980
- Cuadrangular Azteca: 1981
- Copa Camel (Los Angeles): 1991
- Cuadrangular Querétaro: 1992
- Torneo Monterrey 400: 1996
- Copa Pachuca: 1997, 1998, 2002, 2006, 2007
- Copa 5 de Mayo: 2004
- Copa Panamericana DirecTV: 2007
- Copa Amistad: 2007
- Copa Aztex: 2009
- Copa Socio MX: 2015
- Supercopa Tecate: 2017
- Dynamo Charities Cup: 2017
- Copa GNP por México: 2020
- Copa Sky: 2022
- Copa Fundadores: 2024, 2026
