= 1968–69 Mexican Primera División season =

26th professional season of the top-flight football league in Mexico

Primera División de México
- Season: 1968–69
- Champions: Cruz Azul (1st title)
- Relegated: Nuevo León
- Champions' Cup: Cruz Azul
- Matches: 240
- Goals: 655 (2.73 per match)

Statistics of the México Primera División for the 1968–69 season.

== Overview ==
Laguna was promoted to Primera División.

The season was contested by 16 teams, and Cruz Azul won the championship. The season was suspended from September 16 to November 8 for the celebration of the 1968 Summer Olympic Games in Mexico City.

Nuevo León was relegated to Segunda División

=== Teams ===
Location of the 1968-69 Primera División teams

Team	City	Stadium
América	Mexico City	Azteca
Atlante	Mexico City	Azteca
Atlas	Guadalajara, Jalisco	Jalisco
Cruz Azul	Jasso, Hidalgo	10 de Diciembre
Guadalajara	Guadalajara, Jalisco	Jalisco
Irapuato	Irapuato, Guanajuato	Revolución / Irapuato (Note: The team played until Week 20 on Estadio Revolución. From Week 22, Irapuato moved to the new Estadio Irapuato)
Laguna	Torreón, Coahuila	San Isidro
León	León, Guanajuato	León
Monterrey	Monterrey, Nuevo León	Tecnológico
Necaxa	Mexico City	Azteca
Nuevo León	Monterrey, Nuevo León	Tecnológico
Oro	Guadalajara, Jalisco	Jalisco
Pachuca	Pachuca, Hidalgo	Revolución Mexicana
Toluca	Toluca, State of Mexico	Luis Gutiérrez Dosal
UNAM	Mexico City	Ciudad de los Deportes / Olímpico Universitario (Note: At Week 27, UNAM returned to Estadio Olímpico Universitario after celebration of 1968 Summer Olympics)
Veracruz	Veracruz, Veracruz	Parque Deportivo Veracruzano / Estadio Veracruzano (Note: Until Week 11, Veracruz played its local games at Parque Deportivo Veracruzno. In the Week 13 game against Toluca was the opening of the new Estadio Veracruzano)

== League standings ==
Pos	Team	Pld	W	D	L	GF	GA	GD	Pts	Qualification
1	Cruz Azul	30	18	8	4	49	26	+23	44	Champions
2	Guadalajara	30	14	10	6	45	30	+15	38	
3	Toluca	30	13	8	9	43	30	+13	34	
4	UNAM	30	13	8	9	50	42	+8	34	
5	América	30	14	6	10	38	36	+2	34	
6	Atlas	30	13	8	9	41	39	+2	34	
7	León	30	13	5	12	54	50	+4	31	
8	Atlante	30	12	7	11	43	44	−1	31	
9	Necaxa	30	10	9	11	38	31	+7	29	
10	Pachuca	30	11	6	13	49	51	−2	28	
11	Monterrey	30	10	8	12	37	46	−9	28	
12	Veracruz	30	8	11	11	29	35	−6	27	
13	Laguna	30	7	9	14	34	45	−11	23	
14	Irapuato	30	7	9	14	38	52	−14	23	
15	Nuevo León	30	7	7	16	33	44	−11	21	Relegation Playoff
16	Oro	30	7	7	16	34	54	−20	21	Relegation Playoff

1968–69 winners

1st title

== Results ==
Home \ Away	AME	ATE	ATS	CAZ	GDL	IRA	LAG	LEO	MTY	NEC	JNL	ORO	PAC	TOL	UNM	VER
América	—	0–1	0–1	0–2	2–2	0–0	2–1	1–0	1–0	2–0	4–2	1–0	3–1	2–1	1–1	2–1
Atlante	2–0	—	5–2	0–1	0–2	3–0	2–0	2–1	1–0	1–2	1–5	1–1	3–1	3–1	2–4	1–1
Atlas	2–2	1–2	—	1–0	0–0	0–0	1–0	4–2	2–0	0–1	2–0	1–3	2–0	1–0	2–0	2–2
Cruz Azul	2–0	2–2	3–1	—	2–0	2–0	1–1	4–1	3–0	0–0	2–0	2–1	2–1	2–2	1–0	0–0
Guadalajara	3–0	3–1	2–2	0–1	—	3–1	1–1	2–0	0–0	0–2	0–3	4–2	1–1	1–0	3–2	1–0
Irapuato	0–2	1–1	5–0	0–2	0–0	—	4–2	1–1	3–0	1–5	1–1	2–1	2–3	2–1	2–2	3–1
Laguna	2–0	2–0	1–2	1–2	2–2	0–0	—	1–4	2–3	1–0	2–0	0–0	2–0	1–1	1–2	1–0
León	2–3	2–0	0–1	2–3	0–5	4–2	3–1	—	1–1	5–1	3–0	5–3	4–2	3–2	2–1	1–0
Monterrey	2–1	1–1	1–0	2–2	0–1	2–0	1–1	2–2	—	0–3	1–0	2–3	3–2	1–1	4–2	1–0
Necaxa	2–0	2–1	1–1	0–1	1–2	2–1	4–1	0–1	2–2	—	1–1	6–1	0–0	0–1	1–1	1–0
Nuevo León	0–1	3–1	1–2	0–1	1–2	3–1	1–2	0–0	1–5	3–1	—	1–1	0–0	0–0	0–1	1–1
Oro	1–2	0–1	2–4	1–1	0–0	1–1	1–1	0–1	0–1	1–0	3–2	—	3–1	2–1	2–4	1–0
Pachuca	0–2	3–3	2–1	2–2	1–2	3–0	1–0	4–2	2–1	1–0	2–3	1–0	—	3–0	4–1	6–2
Toluca	1–1	3–0	1–0	3–2	1–0	2–0	4–2	1–0	4–0	1–1	2–0	4–0	2–1	—	0–1	2–0
UNAM	2–2	0–2	3–2	4–1	2–1	4–1	1–1	1–1	2–0	1–0	0–1	1–0	5–1	1–1	—	1–1
Veracruz	2–1	0–0	1–1	1–0	2–2	1–4	2–1	2–1	3–1	0–0	1–0	3–0	0–0	0–0	2–0	—

Updated to match(es) played on 2 March 1969. Source: RSSSF
Legend: Blue = home team win; Yellow = draw; Red = away team win.

=== Relegation Playoff ===
6 March 1969

Nuevo León	1–1 (a.e.t.)	Oro
Dámaso Pérez 32' (pen.)		Miguel Ángel Perrichón 22'

Estadio Azteca, México City

Aggregate tied. Replay will take place.

9 March 1969

Nuevo León	2–2 (a.e.t.)	Oro
Mario Aguilar 2'; José Álvarez Crespo 13'		Bernardino Brambila 23'; José de Oliveira 58'

Estadio Azteca, México City

Aggregate tied. Replay will take place.

13 March 1969

Nuevo León	0–1	Oro
	2nd Replay	Bernardino Brambila 89'

Estadio Azteca, México City

Oro won 4-3 on aggregate. Nuevo León is relegated to Segunda Division.
