= Lagunas, Oaxaca =

Coordinates: 16.8011°N 95.0722°W

Lagunas, Oaxaca is a town in the municipality of El Barrio de La Soledad, in the state of Oaxaca, Mexico It is located in the Isthmus of Tehuantepec. Lagunas is the biggest and richest town in the municipality, with a population of 3,871 people. Matías Romero, Las Almoloyas, and El Barrio de la Soledad are all neighboring counties.

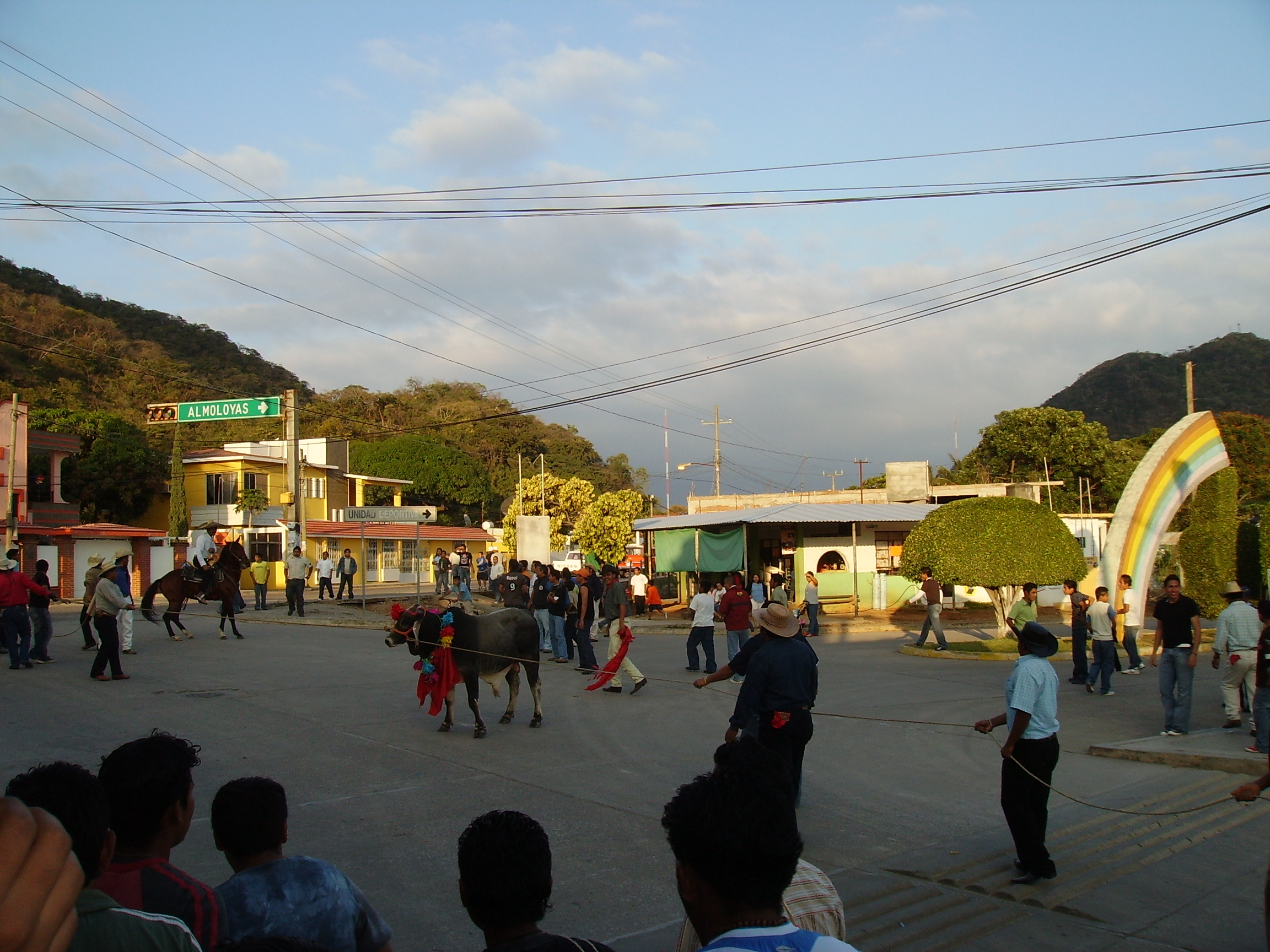
Calenda

Lagunas has a rich, indigenous and Mestizo culture along with popular festivities like the Night of Huapango.

The weather in Lagunas is hot with a dry heat, combined with winds coming from the Gulf of Mexico. The weather comes close to a desert-like climate and various types of desert plants such as cactus can be found in this habitat. The climate is also great for growing mangos, and this is why many mango trees can be found in this region.

Cooperativa La Cruz Azul, founded in 1942, is the largest company in Lagunas.

== Education ==
The town has three preschools, three primary schools, a high school, and a preparatory school. The government runs a nursery school, as well as a private nursery school for three- to five-year-old children.

The Blue Cross Educational Center (Centro Educativo Cruz Azul, CECA) is one of the most important educational centers in the region, and is incorporated to the National Autonomous University of Mexico (UNAM).

The Center for the Culture and sports (CUDER) of Lagunas is another facility for learning and practicing sports.

== Festivities ==
The town is known for their popular festivity where the local women dress in traditional Zapotec attire and men wear a Guayaberas for a party called "The night of the Huapango" the most important in the year.

== Tourism ==
The town sits right beside a lake called Laguna Azul, which offers beautiful lakeside views, as well as lush mountain scenery. In this area there are unique caves and rock formations that are also worth visiting. As mentioned already, the climate of Lagunas makes this town a good source for Mangos.

== Communications and Transportation ==
Lagunas has a radio station called XHCA-FM "Azul FM" (103.9 FM), which broadcasts news, Mexican folk music and international music. This station runs 24 hours a day, and it covers parts of the Isthmus of Tehuantepec, as well as some parts of Veracruz and the Chiapas states.

The city can be reached from the Federal Highway 185. However, the city also has access to a train through its train station. There is a bus station located in Lagunas as well.

== Health Care ==
Lagunas Oaxaca has a hospital called Médica Azul which depends on the Cruz Azul cement group, a general hospital called "Hospital Rosa Elvira Alvarez de Alvarez" and a medical doctor called Delfina Lopez, which specializes in electrotherapy for paralyzed people.

== Sister City ==
- Mexico: Ciudad Cooperativa Cruz Azul, Hidalgo
