= Billy Álvarez =

Mexican football executive (1945–2026)

- Born: Guillermo Héctor Álvarez Cuevas; 8 September 1945; Jasso, Hidalgo, Mexico
- Died: 30 May 2026 (aged 80); Toluca, State of Mexico, Mexico
- Education: Universidad La Salle México
- Parent(s): Guillermo Álvarez Macías; María del Carmen Cuevas Saldaña

Guillermo Héctor Álvarez Cuevas (8 September 1945 – 30 May 2026), better known as Billy Álvarez, was a Mexican football player and executive, convicted criminal, and for three years a wanted fugitive. He was the general director of Cooperativa La Cruz Azul and president of the Mexican football club Cruz Azul from 1988 to 2020. Before his arrest in 2025, Álvarez Cuevas was wanted by Interpol in 195 countries for various crimes including multiple accounts of racketeering, money laundering, and extortion.

Álvarez was the son of Guillermo Álvarez Macías, who was the founder and first general director of the Cruz Azul cooperative.

== Early life ==
Guillermo Héctor Álvarez Cuevas was born on 8 September 1945, to Guillermo Álvarez Macías and María del Carmen Cuevas Saldaña in the town of Jasso, Hidalgo. Álvarez Cuevas had three siblings: José Alfredo, María del Carmen, and María Gilda.

Álvarez briefly played professional football at Cruz Azul Hidalgo as a forward in 1976. He was elected to Congress for the 1994–1997 period, representing the third district of Hidalgo in the Chamber of Deputies for the Institutional Revolutionary Party (PRI).

== Career ==
In 1986, Álvarez became president of the football club Cruz Azul. He was later appointed chairman of Cooperativa La Cruz Azul S.C.L on 1 July 1988.

=== Criminal Indictments ===
On 28 May 2020, the Unidad de Inteligencia Financiera froze the financial accounts of Álvarez, his brother José Alfredo Álvarez, and ex-vice president of Cruz Azul Víctor Manuel Garcés, citing money laundering and financial ties to shell companies worth over 300 million Mexican pesos (approx. US$15 million). Their investigation suggested between 2013 and 2020, 1.2 billion pesos (US$60.6 million) were transferred from the Cruz Azul Cooperative into personal offshore bank accounts, namely in the United States and Spain.

On 26 July 2020, Attorney General Alejandro Gertz Manero issued an arrest warrant for Álvarez and Garcés for ties with criminal organizations. Arrest warrants were also issued for directors of the Cruz Azul Cooperative Miguel Eduardo Borrell, Mario Sánchez Álvarez, and Ángel Martín Junquera.

Cruz Azul faced disaffiliation from the Mexican Football Federation as a result of Álvarez's legal issues. He resigned as the general manager of the co-operative and subsequently stepped down as president of the football club on 1 August 2020, after 32 years as acting president. Jamie Ordiales was then appointed the co-operative's general manager and the club's president.

After over four years as a fugitive from justice, Álvarez was arrested in Mexico City on 16 January 2025 and taken to the Penal del Altiplano federal maximum security prison.

== Personal life and death ==
Álvarez Cuevas's daughter, Mónica Álvarez Álvarez, died of brain cancer on 16 December 2010, at the age of 24. Álvarez died on 30 May 2026, at the age of 80.
