= Cooperativa La Cruz Azul =

Mexican cement cooperative

Cooperativa La Cruz Azul, S.C.L.
- Type: Worker cooperative
- Industry: Construction materials
- Predecessor: Compañía Manufacturera de Cemento Portland "La Cruz Azul"
- Founded: 1881 (as a lime factory); 2 November 1931; 95 years ago (as a cooperative)
- Founder: Henry Gibbon (1881); 192 founding members (1931)
- Headquarters: Coyoacán, Mexico City, Mexico
- Number of locations: 4 cement plants: Tula de Allende, Hidalgo; Lagunas, Oaxaca; Palmar de Bravo, Puebla; Aguascalientes; Campeche (under construction)
- Area served: Mexico
- Key people: Víctor Velázquez (President of the board)
- Products: Cement, ready-mix concrete, aggregates
- Revenue: MXN 29,754 million (2024)
- Number of employees: 2,000 (2024)
- Subsidiaries: Club de Futbol Cruz Azul; Cementos y Concretos Nacionales (CYCNA); CYCNA de Oriente; Concretos Cruz Azul; Médica Azul; Hoteles Azul Ixtapa; Colegios Cruz Azul; Plazas Comerciales Cruz Azul; Gimnasios Cruz Azul
- Website: www.cementocruzazul.com.mx

Cooperativa La Cruz Azul, S.C.L. is a Mexican worker cooperative that produces cement and other construction materials. Headquartered in Coyoacán, Mexico City, it also owns the football club Cruz Azul. It is Mexico's third-largest cement producer by revenue.

The company traces its origins to a hydraulic lime factory established by British businessman Henry Gibbon in Jasso, Hidalgo, in 1881. In 1927, its workers formed a football team as a company team, which entered professional football in 1961 and has since won several national and international titles. After decades of financial difficulty, and facing a takeover by rival producer La Tolteca, the company was expropriated and handed to its workers, who established the cooperative on 2 November 1931 with 192 founding members. A second plant, in Lagunas, Oaxaca, was approved in 1940, and cooperative towns were planned around both plants under Guillermo Álvarez Macías, who led the cooperative from 1953 to 1976.

Guillermo Álvarez Cuevas, son of Álvarez Macías, led the cooperative from 1988 until his resignation in August 2020 amid investigations into alleged financial irregularities. His departure was followed by a dispute between rival groups of members over control of the cooperative, during which the Tula plant ceased operating and a clash there in April 2022 left eight people dead. Álvarez Cuevas died in custody in 2026 while awaiting trial. Under Víctor Velázquez, president of its board of directors, the cooperative operates plants in Hidalgo, Oaxaca, Puebla and Aguascalientes, and is building a fifth in Campeche.

== History ==
=== Origins (1881–1931) ===
In 1881, Englishman Henry Gibbon rented a portion of the former Hacienda de Jasso, in the state of Hidalgo, and installed a hydraulic lime factory. By 1883, fellow Englishman Joseph (or George) Watson had invested heavily in the business. Despite the rich limestone deposits of the region, the business failed to develop for lack of capital and was bankrupt by 1906. The Banco Central took control of the company, with businessman Fernando Pimentel y Fagoaga as a partner, and in 1909 it was reconstituted as a sociedad anónima, the Compañía Manufacturera de Cemento Portland "La Cruz Azul".

A rival plant, La Tolteca, was established the following year and became the company's main competitor. The Mexican Revolution gradually eroded shareholder support, and following the Great Depression and intermittent stoppages at the plant in 1931, La Tolteca agreed to purchase La Cruz Azul's shares in order to eliminate its competitor.

=== Formation of the cooperative (1931–1953) ===
The planned sale led to confrontations between the plant's workers, who sought to keep their jobs, and La Tolteca's owners, who expected to receive the plant free of obligations. With the intervention of the Hidalgo state government, the company was expropriated on grounds of public utility and handed to its workers. The cooperative was established on 2 November 1931 by 192 founding members, who agreed to purchase the company for 1,312,555.66 pesos. The workers undertook to pay the price plus ten per cent interest over ten years to the investors owed compensation, and completed the payments in nine. The cooperative was formally constituted in January 1934, when it was registered with the then Secretaría de Economía Nacional.

On 27 April 1940, the cooperative approved the construction of a second plant in Lagunas, in the Isthmus of Tehuantepec region of Oaxaca.

=== Álvarez Macías era (1953–1976) ===
On 10 December 1953, the general assembly of members placed the company under the leadership of Guillermo Álvarez Macías. During the 1960s, cooperative towns were planned around the Hidalgo and Lagunas plants, and in 1961 the cooperative's football team, Cruz Azul, entered professional football in the Segunda División. Álvarez Macías led the cooperative until his death in 1976.

=== Becerril and Álvarez Cuevas (1976–2020) ===
Following Álvarez Macías's death, Joel Luis Becerril Benítez was elected to lead the cooperative in 1978. Ten years later, in 1988, the cooperative appointed Guillermo Álvarez Cuevas, son of Álvarez Macías, as its director; he had been president of the football club since 1986. Álvarez Cuevas remained in charge for over three decades, until his resignation in August 2020 amid investigations into alleged financial irregularities.

=== Leadership dispute (2020–present) ===
In 2020, arrest warrants were issued against Álvarez Cuevas on charges including organised crime, money laundering and fraudulent administration. In August 2020, Mexico City police seized the cooperative's corporate offices on Periférico Sur, in the borough of Coyoacán, under a court order. Álvarez Cuevas's departure was followed by a dispute between rival groups of members over control of the cooperative and its assets. The Hidalgo plant at Tula de Allende remained under the control of a group aligned with Álvarez Cuevas and ceased operating in 2021; at the time, it accounted for around 35 per cent of the cooperative's revenue. Víctor Velázquez became president of the cooperative's board of directors.

On 27 July 2021, a video surfaced showing some 30 people illegally entering the Lagunas plant in Oaxaca and firing shots; no injuries were reported. In the early hours of 27 April 2022, a clash between the rival groups over control of the Tula plant left eight people dead and 11 injured, according to Hidalgo governor Omar Fayad; nine people were arrested. Ten of those detained were later formally charged with offences including homicide. In September 2024, a further attempt by around 300 people to seize the Tula plant left about 20 people injured; 120 were detained.

After five years as a fugitive, Álvarez Cuevas was formally charged in January 2025 with money laundering and organised crime; prosecutors accused him of laundering 114 million pesos of the cooperative's funds through shell companies. He died on 30 May 2026, aged 80, while held at the Altiplano prison awaiting trial.

On 12 February 2026, the cooperative regained control of the Tula plant in a restitution operation carried out by the Hidalgo state prosecutor's office under a court order. On 19 August, the cooperative announced the reactivation of the plant, with an investment of 6,500 million pesos and an expected annual output of three million tonnes of cement.

== Organisation and governance ==
Cooperativa La Cruz Azul is a sociedad cooperativa limitada (S.C.L.) governed by Mexico's General Law of Cooperative Societies (Ley General de Sociedades Cooperativas), together with its own articles of incorporation and internal regulations. Its highest decision-making body is the general assembly of members (socios), in which each member has an equal vote. The assembly elects two councils: a board of directors (Consejo de Administración), which runs the cooperative, and a supervisory council (Consejo de Vigilancia). The assembly also votes on the admission and exclusion of members.

=== Membership ===
In 2010, the cooperative had 1,260 members, and admission had become rare; candidates could spend up to five years on probation. In 2013, 807 votes represented 89 per cent of the cooperative's members. In August 2020, a representative of the faction loyal to Álvarez Cuevas put the membership at 715, and 481 members, 68.3 per cent of the total, took part in the board elections of April 2021. At the same assembly, 16 new members were admitted; according to the cooperative, admissions had been blocked in 2013 and 2015 under the previous administration. By April 2023, following the exclusion of more than 200 members, the cooperative reported 472 active members.

=== Control dispute ===
Following Álvarez Cuevas's departure in 2020, rival factions each claimed the cooperative's leadership. An assembly of more than 500 members held by the group aligned with Álvarez Cuevas elected Federico Sarabia and Alberto López as presidents of the board of directors and the supervisory council respectively, while the opposing group's leaders, Víctor Velázquez and José Antonio Marín Gutiérrez, were confirmed in those posts at an extraordinary general assembly in April 2021. The Velázquez board regained control of the Puebla and Aguascalientes plants in 2020. In December 2021, a court in Hidalgo granted it legal possession of the Tula plant, but the plant remained under the control of the group aligned with Álvarez Cuevas until February 2026.

In April 2022, the general assembly voted to exclude 206 members, including Álvarez Cuevas, Sarabia and López, with 96.36 per cent of the votes of members present. A further four former executives, among them Álvarez Cuevas's brother José Alfredo, were excluded in April 2023.

== Operations ==
In 2011, the cooperative was Mexico's third-largest cement producer, behind Cemex and Holcim Apasco, with an annual capacity of about 8.5 million tonnes and a market share of around 16 per cent; by 2013 its share had risen to 18.7 per cent. By 2024, it reported revenue of 29,754 million pesos and 2,000 employees, remaining third by revenue behind Cemex and Holcim México. The cooperative operates cement plants in Hidalgo, Oaxaca, Puebla and Aguascalientes, and is building a fifth in Campeche. The plants in Puebla and Aguascalientes are run through its subsidiaries CYCNA and CYCNA de Oriente.

=== Hidalgo ===
The plant at Ciudad Cooperativa Cruz Azul, in the municipality of Tula de Allende, is the company's original site. Before it stopped operating in 2021 amid the cooperative's control dispute, it accounted for around 35 per cent of the cooperative's revenue and up to 40 per cent of its production. In October 2024, the cooperative's legal director estimated its losses from the plant's closure at over US$1.26 billion. After regaining the plant in 2026, the cooperative announced a rehabilitation programme of 6,500 million pesos, including a new production line, with an expected capacity of three million tonnes of cement a year.

=== Oaxaca ===
The plant at Lagunas, in the Isthmus of Tehuantepec, was approved in 1940. In August 2023, the cooperative inaugurated a fifth kiln at the plant, adding 3,700 tonnes a day of clinker capacity, as part of upgrades totalling US$301 million. A new cement mill, costing nearly US$40 million, was begun in 2024.

=== Puebla ===
The plant at Palmar de Bravo, operated by CYCNA de Oriente, opened in March 2007 after an investment of US$350 million, with an initial capacity of one million tonnes a year. A second production line opened in December 2015; Álvarez Cuevas said it raised the plant's capacity to 2.7 million tonnes a year. In September 2023, CYCNA de Oriente opened a paper-bag factory beside the cement plant, at a cost of around US$20 million.

=== Aguascalientes ===
The CYCNA plant in the municipality of Tepezalá began operating in 2000 with 200 workers, after the cooperative's general assembly approved the creation of CYCNA in 1997. In August 2024, the cooperative opened a second line there for processing industrial by-products as alternative fuel, at a cost of US$8.5 million.

=== Campeche ===
Construction of a plant at Seybaplaya, on a site previously used for lime and cement production, began on 1 August 2024. The investment exceeds US$300 million, and the first production line, with a capacity of 3,000 tonnes of cement a day, was scheduled for completion by the end of 2026.

== Group structure ==
During the 1960s, the cooperative founded a set of satellite cooperatives around its plants in Hidalgo and Oaxaca to provide services it had previously contracted from third parties. They were incubated by a parent cooperative, Cooperativa Juárez, and grouped under Núcleo Cruz Azul; they included Núcleo Cooperativo Cuauhtémoc, which transported cement and supplied fuel oil to the plants, and La Istmeña, which leased machinery and supplied spare parts and raw materials. By 2010 the network had ten members, with activities ranging from mining and construction services to lending to sister cooperatives.

From the early 1990s, under Álvarez Cuevas, the cooperative began expanding through sociedades anónimas instead, citing the cost of extending members' lifetime benefits to a larger membership. In 1997, after internal debate, the general assembly approved the creation of Cementos y Concretos Nacionales (CYCNA) to operate a new plant in Aguascalientes, and a second subsidiary, CYCNA de Oriente, later took on the Puebla plant; by 2010 the two accounted for 40 per cent of the cooperative's cement output. Its non-cement businesses operating as companies were grouped as Grupo Cruz Azul; among them, Concretos Cruz Azul, a ready-mix concrete producer founded in 1991, had grown from 64,000 cubic metres of output in its first year to 1.3 million in 2006. In the same period, several of the satellite cooperatives and the civil associations that ran services in the cooperative towns were converted into companies and required to open their services to the public. The group's businesses also include Médica Azul, which operates as a sociedad anónima de capital variable, and Hoteles Azul Ixtapa, a hotel business in Ixtapa, Guerrero.

== Community ==
Ciudad Cooperativa Cruz Azul, the company town around the Hidalgo plant in the municipality of Tula de Allende, was planned in the 1960s under Álvarez Macías, together with a similar town around the Lagunas plant. In 2010, Ciudad Cooperativa had around 7,000 inhabitants. In April 2026, the cooperative reopened its Plazas Comerciales Cruz Azul. The cooperative also operates Gimnasios Cruz Azul, a network of sports clubs in Hidalgo and Oaxaca that runs the club's official football academy.

The cooperative's medical services date back at least to the 1980s, when it ran the Sanatorio Cruz Azul in Lagunas. Its health provider, Médica Azul, operated three hospitals and four pharmacies in 2010, and the Centro Educativo Cruz Azul ran schools from kindergarten to upper-secondary level in Hidalgo and Oaxaca. The cooperative's first school, a primary school in Ciudad Cooperativa Cruz Azul, Hidalgo, opened in 1934; the Centro Educativo Cruz Azul was legally constituted as a civil association on 28 August 1996 and has operated as Colegios Cruz Azul since 22 August 2024. Members' benefits have included medical cover, scholarships for study at private universities and long-term credit. In August 2026, as part of the Tula reactivation, the cooperative announced an investment of over 1,000 million pesos to refurbish the Cruz Azul hospital in Hidalgo, and said the club's Liga de Expansión MX team would play its home matches at the Estadio Refundación in Ciudad Cooperativa.

== Cruz Azul football club ==
The football club was formed in Jasso on 22 May 1927 by workers at the plant, on the initiative of Carlos Garcés, a dentist who treated the company's employees. It played in amateur competition until 1961, when it entered the Segunda División, and won promotion to the Primera División on 19 January 1964; it has not been relegated since. In 1971, the club moved from Jasso to Mexico City to play at the Estadio Azteca. By 2026, it had won ten league titles, most recently the Liga MX Clausura 2026, and seven continental titles, most recently the 2025 CONCACAF Champions Cup.

The club remains owned by the cooperative, and its leadership has often overlapped with the cooperative's: Álvarez Cuevas became club president in 1986, two years before taking charge of the cooperative, and Velázquez Rangel heads both. In the restructuring of the 1990s, the club's staff were removed from the cooperative's payroll, along with those of other associations in the cooperative's network. According to the Associated Press, Álvarez Cuevas was accused of using the club to conceal illicit dealings, including by inflating the transfer fees paid for players and keeping the difference.
