= Estadio Refundación =

Football stadium in Jasso, Mexico

Coordinates: 19.9939582°N 99.3254077°W

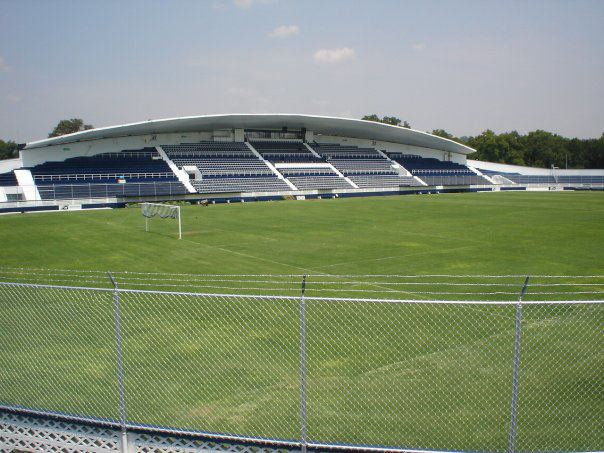
- Interactive map of Estadio Refundación
- Full name: Estadio Refundación
- Former names: Estadio 10 de Diciembre (1963–2026)
- Location: Ciudad Cooperativa Cruz Azul, Hidalgo
- Owner: Cooperativa La Cruz Azul
- Operator: Cruz Azul
- Capacity: 7,761
- Surface: Grass

Construction
- Opened: 1963

Tenants
- Cruz Azul (1963–1971); Cruz Azul Hidalgo (1963–2021, 2026–present); Cruz Azul Premier (2015–2018); Cruz Azul Femenil (2018–2020)

Estadio Refundación, formerly named Estadio 10 de Diciembre, is a multi-use stadium in the Mexican town of Jasso, Hidalgo. It is currently used mostly for football matches. The stadium holds 7,761 people and opened in 1963.

== History ==
The stadium was inaugurated in 1963 to host Cruz Azul's matches; the team remained there until 1971 when it moved to Mexico City due to the great popularity it achieved in the early 1970s. After that, the stadium became the home of Cruz Azul's secondary teams, especially Cruz Azul Hidalgo, created to maintain a representative team for the town. In 2018 it became the stadium of the club's women's team.

Due to changes in the management of the Cruz Azul Cooperative, at the end of 2020 the club's women's team stopped playing in this stadium and returned to Mexico City, while in the summer of 2021 the Cruz Azul Hidalgo project was suspended, which left the Estadio 10 de Diciembre without representative teams.

In February 2026, the Cooperativa Cruz Azul's board regained control of the town where the stadium is located, thus opening the door to the return of the club's football teams to Jasso. In April, the return of Cruz Azul Hidalgo was announced after a five-year suspension; in addition, the team was promoted to the Liga de Expansión MX.

In July 2026, the stadium was renamed Estadio Refundación (Refounding Stadium) as the Cooperativa's board initiated a policy aimed at erasing the memory of the previous administration, considering it a rebranding. Additionally, the return of Cruz Azul's first team to play preseason matches in the city was announced.
