= 1973–74 Mexican Segunda División season =

Segunda División de México
- Season: 1973–74
- Champions: UANL (1st Title)
- Promoted: UAG; Nuevo Necaxa; U. de S.L.P.
- Relegated: UAEM
- Matches played: 392
- Goals scored: 1,138 (2.9 per match)
- Top goalscorer: José Luis Puente (30 goals)

The 1973–74 Segunda División was the 25th season of the Mexican Segunda División. The season started on 29 July 1973 and concluded on 19 May 1974. It was won by UANL.

== Changes ==
- La Piedad and Nacional returned after a year on hiatus, for that reason, the league was expanded to 20 teams.
- Ciudad Madero was promoted to Primera División.
- Pachuca was relegated from Segunda División.
- Atlético Cuernavaca, Orizaba and Tecnológico de Celaya were relegated from Segunda División
- UAG, Nuevo Necaxa and U. de S.L.P. were promoted from Tercera División.
- Morelia was bought by new owners and was renamed as Atlético Morelia.

== Teams ==
1973–74 season Teams

Club	City	Stadium
Atlético Morelia	Morelia	Estadio Venustiano Carranza
Cuautla	Cuautla	Estadio Isidro Gil Tapia
Irapuato	Irapuato	Estadio Irapuato
La Piedad	La Piedad	Estadio Juan N. López
Nacional	Guadalajara	Estadio Tecnológico U. de G.
Naucalpan	Naucalpan	Unidad Cuauhtémoc
Nuevo Necaxa	Juan Galindo	Estadio 14 de Diciembre
Pachuca	Pachuca	Estadio Revolución Mexicana
Querétaro	Querétaro City	Estadio Municipal de Querétaro
Salamanca	Salamanca	Estadio El Molinito
Tampico	Tampico	Estadio Tamaulipas
Unión de Curtidores	León	Estadio La Martinica
UAEM	Toluca	Estadio Universitario Alberto "Chivo" Córdoba
UAG	Zapopan	Estadio Tres de Marzo
UANL	Monterrey	Estadio Universitario
U. de G.	Guadalajara	Estadio Tecnológico U. de G.
U. de N.	Tepic	Estadio Nicolás Álvarez Ortega
U. de S.L.P.	San Luis Potosí City	Estadio Plan de San Luis
Ciudad Victoria	Ciudad Victoria	Estadio Marte R. Gómez
Zamora	Zamora	Estadio Moctezuma

== Group stage ==
=== Group A ===
Pos	Team	Pld	W	D	L	GF	GA	GD	Pts	Qualification or relegation
1	U. de G. (Q)	38	22	13	3	62	26	+36	57	Qualified to Playoffs
2	UANL (Q)	38	22	7	9	73	45	+28	51	Qualified to Playoffs
3	Nacional	38	19	10	9	59	53	+6	48	
4	Atlético Morelia	38	18	4	16	79	60	+19	40	
5	Pachuca	38	12	14	12	68	53	+15	38	
6	Cuautla	38	11	14	13	58	63	−5	36	
7	Ciudad Victoria	38	10	15	13	43	52	−9	35	
8	Tampico	38	12	10	16	45	50	−5	34	
9	Nuevo Necaxa	38	11	12	15	36	43	−7	34	
10	UAEM (R)	38	8	12	18	40	71	−31	28	Relegated

Source: RSSSF
(Q) Qualified for the phase indicated; (R) Relegated

=== Group 1 ===
Pos	Team	Pld	W	D	L	GF	GA	GD	Pts	Qualification or relegation
1	Unión de Curtidores (Q)	38	17	12	9	55	36	+19	46	Qualified to Playoffs
2	Salamanca (Q)	38	14	15	9	58	52	+6	43	Qualified to Playoffs
3	Querétaro	38	15	10	13	60	53	+7	40	
4	U. de S.L.P.	38	16	7	15	59	58	+1	39	
5	Irapuato	38	13	10	15	51	46	+5	36	
6	UAG	38	13	10	15	54	63	−9	36	
7	Universidad de Nayarit	38	10	13	15	51	62	−11	33	
8	Zamora	38	10	9	19	59	74	−15	29	
9	La Piedad	38	9	11	18	52	76	−24	29	Relegation Playoffs
10	Naucalpan	38	7	14	17	61	87	−26	28	Relegation Playoffs

Source: RSSSF
(Q) Qualified for the phase indicated

== Results ==
Home \ Away	ATM	CUA	IRA	LPD	NAC	NAU	NEC	PAC	QUE	SAL	TAM	UDC	UEM	UAG	UNL	UDG	UDN	USL	VIC	ZAM
Atlético Morelia	—	5–0	2–0	5–2	1–2	2–1	2–0	4–3	2–3	6–1	1–2	1–3	2–3	4–1	2–1	1–1	2–1	2–1	3–0	4–2
Cuautla	2–3	—	4–2	2–2	4–1	1–1	1–0	1–1	2–1	1–1	0–0	2–0	1–1	1–1	4–0	1–2	1–1	1–3	3–1	3–3
Irapuato	3–2	3–0	—	2–2	3–0	0–0	3–0	1–1	1–2	2–3	1–0	2–1	2–0	4–0	2–0	1–2	1–2	1–2	3–0	1–0
La Piedad	1–1	1–5	2–0	—	0–1	2–2	1–0	1–0	1–1	0–3	0–0	1–2	2–3	2–2	1–5	1–2	2–0	2–2	1–0	2–1
Nacional	0–1	1–0	1–1	2–3	—	2–1	2–1	2–1	2–1	2–0	3–1	0–2	1–0	1–0	2–1	1–1	4–1	1–0	3–3	3–3
Naucalpan	1–5	2–2	1–3	4–3	2–2	—	1–1	1–4	2–2	1–1	1–4	6–2	4–3	0–3	1–2	1–1	1–3	1–1	2–2	4–1
Nuevo Necaxa	2–2	3–3	2–0	1–0	4–1	1–2	—	0–0	2–0	0–2	2–1	1–0	0–0	1–1	1–1	1–2	1–0	0–1	1–1	3–1
Pachuca	1–1	2–0	0–2	4–0	2–2	7–0	0–1	—	2–1	3–3	4–0	1–1	3–1	2–2	4–1	1–0	3–2	5–1	2–2	3–1
Querétaro	2–1	3–0	0–0	5–1	1–1	6–2	2–1	1–1	—	2–1	2–0	0–0	1–2	2–1	2–1	0–2	3–3	0–2	0–1	4–0
Salamanca	3–2	2–0	2–0	1–1	1–1	1–1	3–2	1–1	1–1	—	2–0	1–2	1–0	3–0	1–2	0–0	5–1	3–2	2–2	3–2
Tampico	1–2	4–1	1–0	0–1	3–1	3–1	0–0	2–1	1–0	5–0	—	1–1	3–0	1–2	1–4	0–3	1–1	0–2	1–0	2–2
Unión de Curtidores	3–1	0–1	1–0	1–1	0–1	2–1	2–0	2–0	1–1	1–1	3–1	—	3–0	4–0	1–1	1–1	0–0	3–2	4–1	2–0
UAEM	2–1	2–2	2–2	3–4	1–2	3–2	1–1	3–3	3–2	0–0	1–1	0–0	—	1–1	2–1	0–1	0–0	1–2	0–0	1–1
UAG	2–1	1–2	3–0	4–3	2–1	2–3	1–1	1–0	1–3	1–0	2–0	1–1	2–0	—	0–1	0–2	2–0	3–5	1–0	3–1
UANL	1–0	2–0	0–0	3–2	4–3	0–1	0–0	1–1	1–0	3–2	0–0	2–1	6–0	2–1	—	5–1	2–1	2–0	3–1	4–1
U. de G.	2–1	3–0	0–0	1–0	1–1	3–2	4–0	2–1	1–2	2–0	3–0	0–0	1–0	3–0	1–1	—	5–1	5–1	2–0	3–1
U. de N.	2–3	2–1	3–3	2–1	1–2	1–1	2–2	2–0	4–1	0–0	1–1	0–1	2–0	1–1	2–1	0–0	—	4–1	2–0	1–1
U. de S.L.P.	1–1	2–1	0–0	2–2	1–2	2–1	1–0	1–0	2–3	1–2	2–1	1–0	4–0	3–3	1–4	0–0	3–0	—	1–2	3–1
Ciudad Victoria	2–1	2–2	0–0	3–0	1–1	2–1	0–1	0–0	0–0	1–1	1–1	3–2	0–1	2–2	1–2	1–1	2–1	1–0	—	3–1
Zamora	2–1	1–1	3–2	1–0	1–2	2–2	2–0	6–1	3–0	1–1	1–2	0–2	4–0	2–1	1–3	0–0	4–2	1–0	1–2	—

Source: RSSSF
Legend: Blue = home team win; Yellow = draw; Red = away team win.

== Promotion Playoff ==
Semi-finals
1A	U. de G.	2	1	3
2B	Salamanca	1	1	2
1B	Unión de Curtidores	1	1	2
2A	UANL	1	2	3

Final
1A	U. de G.	0	2	2
2A	UANL	3	0	3

=== Final ===
May 11, 1974

UANL	3–0	U. de G.
Alberto Rodríguez 47', 71'; José Luis Puente 77'	Report

Estadio Universitario, San Nicolás de los Garza

May 19, 1974

U. de G.	2–0	UANL
Enrique Zamora 44'; Javán García 46'	Report

Estadio Tecnológico U. de G., Guadalajara

== Relegation Playoff ==
Playoffs
18	La Piedad	1	3	4
2	Tapatío	0	0	0
19	Naucalpan	2	9	11
3	Coatzacoalcos	1	2	3

Winners
18	La Piedad
19	Naucalpan
