= 1975–76 Mexican Segunda División season =

Segunda División de México
- Season: 1975–76
- Champions: San Luis (2nd Title)
- Promoted: UAEM; Tapatío; Estudiantes Querétaro
- Relegated: Inter Acapulco
- Matches played: 578
- Goals scored: 1,564 (2.71 per match)
- Top goalscorer: Alfonso Oviedo (33 goals)

The 1975–76 Segunda División was the 27th season of the Mexican Segunda División. The season started on 2 August 1975 and concluded on 18 July 1976. It was won by San Luis.

In this season the champion definition system changed, the two best teams in each group advanced to a league of two groups with four teams each, the winner of each sector had to play a final series to determine the champion.

== Changes ==
- Tecos was promoted to Primera División.
- Ciudad Madero was relegated from Primera División, however, the team was dissolved at the end of the season.
- UAEM, Tapatío and Estudiantes de Querétaro were promoted from Tercera División.
- Iguala, Ciudad Sahagún and Deportivo Acapulco were relegated from Segunda División.
- Pachuca returned after a year in hiatus.
- Nacional was relocated at Ciudad Guzmán, Jalisco.

== Teams ==
1975–76 season Teams

| Club | City | Stadium |
|---|---|---|
| Atlético Morelia | Morelia | Estadio Venustiano Carranza |
| Atlético Tepeji del Río | Tepeji del Río; Pachuca | Estadio Tepeji; Estadio Revolución Mexicana |
| Celaya | Celaya | Estadio Miguel Alemán Valdés |
| Córdoba | Córdoba | Estadio Rafael Murillo Vidal |
| Cuautla | Cuautla | Estadio Isidro Gil Tapia |
| Estudiantes Querétaro | Querétaro City | Estadio Municipal de Querétaro |
| Halcones Saltillo | Saltillo | Estadio Olímpico Francisco I. Madero |
| Inter Acapulco | Acapulco | Unidad Deportiva Acapulco |
| Irapuato | Irapuato | Estadio Irapuato |
| La Piedad | La Piedad | Estadio Juan N. López |
| Nacional | Ciudad Guzmán | Estadio Municipal Santa Rosa |
| Naucalpan | Naucalpan | Unidad Cuauhtémoc |
| Nuevo Necaxa | Juan Galindo | Estadio 14 de Diciembre |
| Pachuca | Pachuca | Estadio Revolución Mexicana |
| Querétaro | Querétaro City | Estadio Municipal de Querétaro |
| Salamanca | Salamanca | Estadio El Molinito |
| San Luis | San Luis Potosí City | Estadio Plan de San Luis |
| Tampico | Tampico | Estadio Tamaulipas |
| Tapatío | Guadalajara | Casa Club Guadalajara |
| Tecnológico de Celaya | Celaya | Estadio Miguel Alemán Valdés |
| UAEM | Toluca | Estadio Universitario Alberto "Chivo" Córdoba |
| UAT | Ciudad Victoria | Estadio Marte R. Gómez |
| U. de N. | Tepic | Estadio Nicolás Álvarez Ortega |
| Ciudad Victoria | Ciudad Victoria | Estadio Marte R. Gómez |

== Group stage ==
=== Group 1 ===
| Pos | Team | Pld | W | D | L | GF | GA | GD | Pts | Qualification or relegation |
|---|---|---|---|---|---|---|---|---|---|---|
| 1 | Atlético Morelia (Q) | 46 | 22 | 13 | 11 | 79 | 49 | +30 | 57 | Qualified to Playoffs |
| 2 | Córdoba (Q) | 46 | 17 | 11 | 18 | 69 | 64 | +5 | 45 | Qualified to Playoffs |
| 3 | Querétaro | 46 | 13 | 13 | 20 | 46 | 45 | +1 | 39 | |
| 4 | Pachuca | 46 | 13 | 12 | 21 | 61 | 81 | −20 | 38 | |
| 5 | Halcones Saltillo | 46 | 13 | 10 | 23 | 67 | 100 | −33 | 36 | |
| 6 | Cuautla | 46 | 10 | 9 | 27 | 39 | 93 | −54 | 29 | |

Source: RSSSF
(Q) Qualified for the phase indicated

=== Group 2 ===
| Pos | Team | Pld | W | D | L | GF | GA | GD | Pts | Qualification or relegation |
|---|---|---|---|---|---|---|---|---|---|---|
| 1 | Naucalpan (Q) | 46 | 21 | 14 | 11 | 72 | 49 | +23 | 56 | Qualified to Playoffs |
| 2 | Irapuato (Q) | 46 | 22 | 11 | 13 | 79 | 40 | +39 | 55 | Qualified to Playoffs |
| 3 | Tapatío | 46 | 18 | 15 | 13 | 63 | 53 | +10 | 51 | |
| 4 | Nacional | 46 | 19 | 11 | 16 | 52 | 58 | −6 | 49 | |
| 5 | Celaya | 46 | 7 | 18 | 21 | 42 | 72 | −30 | 32 | |
| 6 | Inter Acapulco (R) | 46 | 9 | 9 | 28 | 44 | 88 | −44 | 27 | Relegated |

Source: RSSSF
(Q) Qualified for the phase indicated; (R) Relegated

=== Group 3 ===
| Pos | Team | Pld | W | D | L | GF | GA | GD | Pts | Qualification or relegation |
|---|---|---|---|---|---|---|---|---|---|---|
| 1 | San Luis (Q) | 46 | 29 | 11 | 6 | 87 | 35 | +52 | 69 | Qualified to Playoffs |
| 2 | Estudiantes Querétaro (Q) | 46 | 22 | 12 | 12 | 69 | 50 | +19 | 56 | Qualified to Playoffs |
| 3 | Tampico | 46 | 19 | 14 | 13 | 67 | 53 | +14 | 52 | |
| 4 | Universidad de Nayarit | 46 | 19 | 8 | 19 | 66 | 60 | +6 | 46 | |
| 5 | Ciudad Victoria | 46 | 17 | 12 | 17 | 58 | 58 | 0 | 46 | |
| 6 | Salamanca | 46 | 12 | 15 | 19 | 47 | 65 | −18 | 39 | |

Source: RSSSF
(Q) Qualified for the phase indicated

=== Group 4 ===
| Pos | Team | Pld | W | D | L | GF | GA | GD | Pts | Qualification or relegation |
|---|---|---|---|---|---|---|---|---|---|---|
| 1 | Tecnológico de Celaya (Q) | 46 | 27 | 6 | 13 | 90 | 61 | +29 | 60 | Qualified to Playoffs |
| 2 | Atlético Tepeji del Río (Q) | 46 | 20 | 15 | 11 | 62 | 46 | +16 | 55 | Qualified to Playoffs |
| 3 | Nuevo Necaxa | 46 | 21 | 12 | 13 | 68 | 52 | +16 | 54 | |
| 4 | UAEM | 46 | 19 | 12 | 15 | 71 | 63 | +8 | 50 | |
| 5 | La Piedad | 46 | 11 | 11 | 24 | 46 | 68 | −22 | 33 | |
| 6 | UAT | 46 | 9 | 12 | 25 | 55 | 96 | −41 | 30 | |

Source: RSSSF
(Q) Qualified for the phase indicated

== Results ==
| Home \ Away | ATM | ATP | CEL | CÓR | CUA | EST | HSL | INT | IRA | LPD | NAC | NAU | NEC | PAC | QUE | SAL | SNL | TAM | TAP | TEC | UEM | UAT | UDN | VIC |
|---|---|---|---|---|---|---|---|---|---|---|---|---|---|---|---|---|---|---|---|---|---|---|---|---|
| Atlético Morelia | — | 4–1 | 2–1 | 1–0 | 3–0 | 2–0 | 2–1 | 3–0 | 0–0 | 2–2 | 6–1 | 2–1 | 4–0 | 2–1 | 1–1 | 1–1 | 0–1 | 4–0 | 2–1 | 1–0 | 2–0 | 5–2 | 3–2 | 2–1 |
| Atlético Tepeji | 2–1 | — | 0–0 | 2–2 | 4–0 | 1–1 | 6–2 | 1–0 | 0–0 | 1–0 | 0–1 | 2–0 | 0–0 | 1–2 | 1–0 | 2–1 | 1–0 | 1–0 | 2–2 | 0–1 | 2–1 | 2–1 | 0–0 | 2–1 |
| Celaya | 0–0 | 1–1 | — | 3–2 | 1–1 | 0–3 | 1–1 | 2–1 | 1–1 | 3–2 | 2–2 | 2–3 | 0–1 | 0–0 | 1–1 | 1–1 | 1–1 | 2–0 | 2–2 | 2–2 | 2–0 | 2–2 | 0–1 | 0–1 |
| Córdoba | 1–1 | 1–0 | 2–0 | — | 1–0 | 0–1 | 6–2 | 3–1 | 0–1 | 1–0 | 0–0 | 0–0 | 1–1 | 1–0 | 2–1 | 2–2 | 5–0 | 0–1 | 4–1 | 3–2 | 0–1 | 2–1 | 3–0 | 2–3 |
| Cuautla | 1–1 | 0–1 | 1–0 | 2–4 | — | 0–3 | 0–1 | 0–1 | 1–2 | 2–1 | 1–0 | 1–0 | 0–0 | 0–0 | 1–4 | 2–1 | 0–3 | 2–1 | 1–1 | 2–3 | 1–2 | 3–3 | 2–0 | 1–0 |
| Estudiantes Qro. | 0–0 | 2–1 | 1–0 | 4–1 | 2–0 | — | 4–0 | 3–1 | 0–0 | 2–2 | 2–1 | 2–1 | 0–1 | 2–3 | 2–1 | 2–1 | 1–1 | 2–1 | 2–0 | 1–3 | 0–1 | 2–0 | 1–1 | 3–1 |
| Halcones Saltillo | 3–2 | 1–2 | 2–3 | 5–1 | 2–2 | 3–1 | — | 3–2 | 1–0 | 2–3 | 0–1 | 3–3 | 0–0 | 3–1 | 2–1 | 2–0 | 1–1 | 1–1 | 2–1 | 2–3 | 1–1 | 2–2 | 0–3 | 0–0 |
| Inter Acapulco | 2–1 | 1–0 | 0–0 | 1–1 | 0–2 | 1–3 | 4–1 | — | 2–1 | 1–1 | 1–0 | 0–2 | 1–0 | 1–1 | 0–1 | 2–1 | 0–2 | 1–4 | 1–3 | 2–2 | 1–1 | 0–0 | 1–2 | 2–2 |
| Irapuato | 3–2 | 3–1 | 1–0 | 2–1 | 2–0 | 6–1 | 5–0 | 4–0 | — | 3–1 | 3–0 | 2–2 | 4–0 | 3–0 | 3–0 | 4–0 | 2–0 | 0–0 | 0–0 | 3–4 | 1–2 | 5–0 | 3–0 | 2–1 |
| La Piedad | 0–1 | 2–1 | 0–0 | 1–2 | 4–1 | 0–1 | 3–0 | 2–1 | 1–0 | — | 0–0 | 0–1 | 0–1 | 2–1 | 0–0 | 3–2 | 0–0 | 2–1 | 1–0 | 1–3 | 1–3 | 2–2 | 0–2 | 0–0 |
| Nacional | 1–0 | 1–2 | 3–2 | 3–1 | 2–1 | 0–0 | 1–1 | 1–0 | 1–0 | 1–0 | — | 1–0 | 1–0 | 1–0 | 1–1 | 3–1 | 2–4 | 2–0 | 2–2 | 0–0 | 3–2 | 5–0 | 0–0 | 0–1 |
| Naucalpan | 0–1 | 2–2 | 5–2 | 1–0 | 1–1 | 2–0 | 2–0 | 4–0 | 2–0 | 4–2 | 3–1 | — | 2–1 | 0–3 | 1–1 | 3–1 | 2–0 | 0–0 | 2–1 | 3–3 | 1–1 | 4–1 | 1–0 | 2–0 |
| Nuevo Necaxa | 2–2 | 2–1 | 3–1 | 2–1 | 3–0 | 1–1 | 2–1 | 5–1 | 0–0 | 3–1 | 4–1 | 2–1 | — | 6–1 | 1–2 | 1–0 | 1–1 | 2–2 | 2–1 | 3–1 | 3–1 | 1–2 | 2–1 | 3–1 |
| Pachuca | 1–3 | 2–0 | 1–0 | 2–2 | 3–3 | 3–2 | 1–2 | 3–0 | 1–1 | 1–1 | 4–0 | 0–3 | 2–0 | — | 0–2 | 1–1 | 4–2 | 4–3 | 1–1 | 0–0 | 0–1 | 1–3 | 4–1 | 2–0 |
| Querétaro | 2–1 | 1–1 | 0–0 | 0–2 | 1–0 | 0–0 | 1–2 | 2–1 | 1–0 | 2–0 | 1–2 | 1–1 | 0–0 | 5–0 | — | 0–1 | 0–1 | 4–0 | 1–1 | 0–1 | 1–0 | 4–0 | 0–1 | 0–1 |
| Salamanca | 2–1 | 0–2 | 0–0 | 1–1 | 1–2 | 0–0 | 2–1 | 3–1 | 1–0 | 2–1 | 1–0 | 1–1 | 1–2 | 1–0 | 2–0 | — | 0–1 | 1–1 | 2–0 | 3–2 | 1–1 | 1–1 | 2–1 | 0–1 |
| San Luis | 1–1 | 1–1 | 4–0 | 1–0 | 6–0 | 1–0 | 4–2 | 3–0 | 4–1 | 2–0 | 4–0 | 2–0 | 1–0 | 2–1 | 3–0 | 2–2 | — | 2–1 | 2–0 | 2–0 | 2–0 | 5–0 | 3–0 | 2–0 |
| Tampico | 1–1 | 1–4 | 6–1 | 1–1 | 3–1 | 1–0 | 3–2 | 1–0 | 0–0 | 3–0 | 0–0 | 2–2 | 2–2 | 3–0 | 1–0 | 0–0 | 3–0 | — | 4–1 | 3–1 | 3–0 | 2–0 | 0–1 | 2–1 |
| Tapatío | 1–1 | 1–1 | 1–0 | 4–2 | 4–0 | 2–1 | 4–0 | 0–0 | 2–1 | 2–0 | 1–2 | 0–1 | 0–0 | 1–0 | 1–0 | 5–1 | 0–0 | 0–0 | — | 1–0 | 2–2 | 3–1 | 3–0 | 1–1 |
| Tec. Celaya | 2–1 | 0–2 | 1–2 | 1–1 | 1–0 | 0–2 | 4–0 | 2–0 | 1–3 | 2–1 | 4–1 | 1–0 | 3–2 | 2–0 | 1–0 | 1–0 | 2–4 | 2–0 | 6–1 | — | 3–0 | 3–1 | 2–0 | 6–1 |
| UAEM | 3–0 | 3–3 | 3–1 | 2–0 | 7–0 | 1–1 | 4–1 | 3–2 | 0–2 | 1–1 | 1–0 | 2–3 | 2–0 | 3–1 | 2–1 | 0–0 | 0–0 | 0–1 | 0–1 | 3–2 | — | 1–2 | 2–1 | 3–2 |
| UAT | 2–1 | 0–1 | 2–0 | 0–3 | 4–0 | 3–5 | 4–3 | 3–1 | 2–0 | 1–2 | 0–3 | 0–0 | 1–2 | 2–2 | 0–0 | 2–2 | 0–3 | 1–2 | 0–2 | 1–2 | 2–2 | — | 0–0 | 0–1 |
| U. de N. | 1–2 | 1–1 | 4–0 | 1–0 | 2–0 | 1–2 | 1–3 | 4–3 | 0–0 | 3–0 | 1–0 | 2–0 | 2–1 | 7–1 | 2–2 | 5–0 | 0–2 | 2–2 | 0–1 | 1–2 | 5–2 | 1–0 | — | 2–0 |
| Ciudad Victoria | 1–1 | 0–0 | 1–0 | 5–1 | 4–1 | 1–1 | 2–0 | 2–3 | 4–2 | 1–0 | 1–1 | 0–0 | 1–0 | 2–2 | 1–0 | 1–0 | 1–1 | 0–1 | 0–1 | 2–3 | 1–1 | 3–1 | 4–1 | — |

Source: RSSSF
Legend: Blue = home team win; Yellow = draw; Red = away team win.

== Promotion stage ==
=== Group 1 ===
| Pos | Team | Pld | W | D | L | GF | GA | GD | Pts | Promotion | SNL | ATM | CÓR | EST |
|---|---|---|---|---|---|---|---|---|---|---|---|---|---|---|
| 1 | San Luis (Q) | 6 | 4 | 1 | 1 | 11 | 5 | +6 | 9 | Qualified to Promotion final | | 2–1 | 1–2 | 5–2 |
| 2 | Atlético Morelia | 6 | 2 | 3 | 1 | 6 | 4 | +2 | 7 | | 0–0 | | 2–1 | 1–1 |
| 3 | Córdoba | 6 | 3 | 0 | 3 | 7 | 7 | 0 | 6 | | 0–2 | 0–2 | | 3–0 |
| 4 | Estudiantes de Querétaro | 6 | 0 | 2 | 4 | 3 | 11 | −8 | 2 | | 0–1 | 0–0 | 0–1 | |

Source: RSSSF
Rules for classification: 1st points; 2nd head-to-head points; 3rd head-to-head goal difference; 4th head-to-head goals scored; 5th goal difference; 6th number of goals scored
(Q) Qualified for the phase indicated

=== Group 2 ===
| Pos | Team | Pld | W | D | L | GF | GA | GD | Pts | Promotion | TEC | IRA | NAU | ATR |
|---|---|---|---|---|---|---|---|---|---|---|---|---|---|---|
| 1 | Tecnológico de Celaya (Q) | 6 | 3 | 1 | 2 | 7 | 4 | +3 | 7 | Qualified to Promotion final | | 2–0 | 3–0 | 1–0 |
| 2 | Irapuato | 6 | 3 | 1 | 2 | 11 | 9 | +2 | 7 | | 1–1 | | 1–0 | 6–2 |
| 3 | Naucalpan | 6 | 3 | 0 | 3 | 7 | 8 | −1 | 6 | | 2–0 | 1–2 | | 2–1 |
| 4 | Atlético Tepeji del Río | 6 | 2 | 0 | 4 | 8 | 12 | −4 | 4 | | 1–0 | 3–1 | 1–2 | |

Source: RSSSF
Rules for classification: 1st points; 2nd head-to-head points; 3rd head-to-head goal difference; 4th head-to-head goals scored; 5th goal difference; 6th number of goals scored
(Q) Qualified for the phase indicated

=== Final ===
July 11, 1976

| San Luis | 1–0 | Tecnológico de Celaya |
|---|---|---|
| Juan de Dios Castillo 67' | Report |

Estadio Plan de San Luis, San Luis Potosí City

July 18, 1976

| Tecnológico de Celaya | 2–2 | San Luis |
|---|---|---|
| Maclovio Murguía 48'; Alfonso Oviedo 89' | Report | Guillermo Arciniegas 70'; Juan de Dios Castillo 90+5' |

Estadio Miguel Alemán Valdés, Celaya
