= 1976–77 Mexican Segunda División season =

Segunda División de México
- Season: 1976–77
- Champions: Atlante (1st Title)
- Promoted: Tuberos de Veracruz
- Relegated: Celaya
- Matches played: 578
- Goals scored: 1,493 (2.58 per match)
- Top goalscorer: Alfonso Oviedo (32 goals)

The 1976–77 Segunda División was the 28th season of the Mexican Segunda División. The season started on 14 August 1976 and concluded on 5 June 1977. It was won by Atlante.

== Changes ==
- San Luis was promoted to Primera División.
- Atlante was relegated from Primera División.
- Tuberos de Veracruz was promoted from Tercera División.
- Inter Acapulco was relegated from Segunda División.
- Universidad de Nayarit was renamed as Tepic.
- Atlético Tepeji del Río moved to Ciudad Sahagún and renamed as Ciudad Sahagún. UAT moved at Ciudad Madero and renamed as Bravos.
- Naucalpan was bought by new owners, the club was moved to Cuernavaca and renamed as Morelos.
- Saltillo was bought by new owners, the club was moved to Colima City and renamed as Jaguares de Colima.
- Tapatío was moved to Autlán after Week 1.

== Teams ==
1976–77 season Teams

Club	City	Stadium
Atlante	Mexico City	Estadio Azteca
Atlético Morelia	Morelia	Estadio Venustiano Carranza
Bravos	Ciudad Madero	Estadio Tamaulipas
Celaya	Celaya	Estadio Miguel Alemán Valdés
Colima	Colima City	Estadio San Jorge; Estadio Colima
Córdoba	Córdoba	Estadio Rafael Murillo Vidal
Cuautla	Cuautla	Estadio Isidro Gil Tapia
Estudiantes Querétaro	Querétaro City	Estadio Municipal de Querétaro
Irapuato	Irapuato	Estadio Irapuato
La Piedad	La Piedad	Estadio Juan N. López
Morelos	Cuernavaca	Estadio Centenario
Nacional	Ciudad Guzmán	Estadio Municipal Santa Rosa
Nuevo Necaxa	Juan Galindo	Estadio 14 de Diciembre
Pachuca	Pachuca	Estadio Revolución Mexicana
Querétaro	Querétaro City	Estadio Municipal de Querétaro
Ciudad Sahagún	Ciudad Sahagún	Estadio Fray Bernardino de Sahagún
Salamanca	Salamanca	Estadio El Molinito
Tampico	Tampico	Estadio Tamaulipas
Tapatío	Autlán	Unidad Deportiva Chapultepec
Tecnológico de Celaya	Celaya	Estadio Miguel Alemán Valdés
Tepic	Tepic	Estadio Nicolás Álvarez Ortega
Tuberos de Veracruz	Veracruz City	Estadio Veracruzano
UAEM	Toluca	Estadio Toluca 70
Ciudad Victoria	Ciudad Victoria	Estadio Marte R. Gómez

== Group stage ==
=== Group 1 ===
Pos	Team	Pld	W	D	L	GF	GA	GD	Pts	Qualification or relegation
1	Atlante (Q)	46	27	12	7	75	33	+42	66	Qualified to Championship Group
2	Tampico (Q)	46	19	15	12	58	51	+7	53	Qualified to Championship Group
3	Estudiantes de Querétaro	46	19	12	15	65	48	+17	50	
4	Tepic	46	13	14	19	66	78	−12	40	
5	Salamanca	46	12	12	22	37	59	−22	36	
6	Celaya (R)	46	6	15	25	46	83	−37	27	Relegated

Source: RSSSF
(Q) Qualified for the phase indicated; (R) Relegated

=== Group 2 ===
Pos	Team	Pld	W	D	L	GF	GA	GD	Pts	Qualification or relegation
1	Tecnológico de Celaya (Q)	46	20	13	13	73	62	+11	53	Qualified to Championship Group
2	Ciudad Sahagún (Q)	46	16	19	11	59	52	+7	51	Qualified to Championship Group
3	Ciudad Victoria	46	12	17	17	52	64	−12	41	
4	Tapatío	46	11	11	24	41	65	−24	33	
5	Pachuca	46	10	11	25	59	96	−37	31	
6	Bravos	46	10	9	27	54	77	−23	29	

Source: RSSSF
(Q) Qualified for the phase indicated

=== Group 3 ===
Pos	Team	Pld	W	D	L	GF	GA	GD	Pts	Qualification or relegation
1	Nuevo Necaxa (Q)	46	25	15	6	72	32	+40	65	Qualified to Championship Group
2	UAEM (Q)	46	19	14	13	70	59	+11	52	Qualified to Championship Group
3	Córdoba	46	16	16	14	61	58	+3	48	
4	Colima	46	17	12	17	61	68	−7	46	
5	Atlético Morelia	46	12	19	15	48	48	0	43	
6	Cuautla	46	11	12	23	51	92	−41	34	

Source: RSSSF
(Q) Qualified for the phase indicated

=== Group 4 ===
Pos	Team	Pld	W	D	L	GF	GA	GD	Pts	Qualification or relegation
1	Querétaro (Q)	46	21	16	9	75	38	+37	58	Qualified to Championship Group
2	Irapuato (Q)	46	25	8	13	70	40	+30	58	Qualified to Championship Group
3	Morelos	46	20	18	8	54	32	+22	58	
4	Nacional	46	20	9	17	66	51	+15	49	
5	Tuberos de Veracruz	46	14	15	17	52	59	−7	43	
6	La Piedad	46	11	18	17	48	68	−20	40	

Source: RSSSF
(Q) Qualified for the phase indicated

== Results ==
Home \ Away	ATL	ATM	BRA	CEL	COL	CÓR	CUA	EST	IRA	LPD	MOR	NAC	NEC	PAC	QUE	SAH	SAL	TAM	TAP	TEC	TEP	TUB	UEM	VIC
Atlante	—	0–0	3–0	3–0	3–2	0–0	2–0	2–0	2–1	1–0	0–0	2–0	1–0	3–0	0–0	3–1	4–0	5–1	1–0	4–1	3–1	1–1	1–0	3–0
Atlético Morelia	1–2	—	1–0	1–1	0–1	0–1	4–2	2–2	0–0	0–0	1–0	1–1	0–1	1–0	0–1	2–2	2–0	1–0	2–0	2–1	0–1	5–2	2–1	0–1
Bravos	2–1	3–2	—	5–0	0–1	1	3–3	1–2	1–0	1–1	0–0	1–3	1–1	0–2	2–0	1–2	2–0	1–2	1–2	0–1	3–1	2–3	3–3	1–0
Celaya	1–3	1–1	1–2	—	3–3	2–2	2–2	1–0	0–1	1–1	1–1	2–0	1–4	1–1	0–4	3–1	0–1	2–0	0–1	2–5	1–2	2–0	0–0	0–0
Colima	2–1	2–1	1–1	2–1	—	0–2	1–1	0–3	2–0	2–3	0–0	2–0	1–2	3–0	2–1	1–1	2–1	1–2	1–0	0–0	1–1	1–1	2–0	3–0
Córdoba	3–0	3–3	1–0	2–1	0–2	—	1–0	1–1	2–1	3–1	1–1	1–4	1–1	5–1	0–2	1–0	1–0	0–1	1–0	5–5	0–0	1–1	3–0	2–1
Cuautla	0–2	1–0	2–0	2–1	2–0	5–3	—	0–0	0–1	0–0	1–2	1–2	0–0	1–1	0–4	0–0	0–1	3–2	2–1	1–5	2–1	2–1	1–1	2–4
Estudiantes Qro.	0–2	3–0	2–1	4–0	0–2	2–3	1–1	—	3–4	3–1	1–1	1–1	2–1	3–0	0–0	0–2	4–0	0–0	2–0	2–0	3–1	2–1	4–1	1–0
Irapuato	0–1	0–0	1–0	2–1	3–1	3–0	5–2	2–1	—	2–0	3–0	1–1	0–3	2–1	2–0	0–1	3–0	0–0	2–1	1–0	5–1	6–1	1–0	3–1
La Piedad	1–1	0–2	1–1	2–1	0–0	1–1	3–0	2–1	1–0	—	1–1	1–1	2–1	3–0	0–0	0–2	4–0	0–0	2–0	2–0	3–1	2–1	4–1	1–0
Morelos	3–1	2–0	2–0	3–2	2–0	1–0	2–1	1–1	1–0	4–0	—	1–2	1–1	3–0	1–0	0–0	2–1	3–0	2–0	0–0	2–1	2–0	2–1	1–0
Nacional	0–2	2–1	3–2	3–0	3–1	1–1	5–0	0–1	1–0	3–1	1–0	—	1–1	3–0	2–0	2–2	2–0	0–1	1–0	4–1	3–1	0–0	0–1	5–1
Nuevo Necaxa	0–1	4–2	2–0	2–0	1–0	1–1	4–1	1–1	1–1	5–0	1–1	3–1	—	3–1	0–1	3–1	2–0	2–1	3–1	2–0	0–1	1–1	4–0	1–1
Pachuca	0–1	0–1	4–3	3–1	0–1	1–0	2–0	2–2	2–2	2–2	0–1	3–1	0–1	—	0–0	1–2	0–0	3–1	4–0	3–4	1–3	1–1	3–1	4–1
Querétaro	1–1	1–1	1–0	1–1	3–0	3–1	7–1	2–1	2–0	4–2	1–0	2–1	1–1	3–0	—	1–1	3–1	0–0	1–0	5–1	1–2	1–1	0–1	4–0
Ciudad Sahagún	1–3	0–0	3–2	2–1	1–0	0–0	1–1	1–0	0–1	3–0	0–0	0–2	0–1	2–2	2–2	—	2–0	1–1	2–1	2–0	3–0	3–2	1–3	3–1
Salamanca	0–0	1–1	4–1	1–0	1–0	3–2	0–0	0–1	0–1	1–2	1–1	2–0	0–1	5–2	2–1	0–0	—	1–1	0–1	0–1	1–1	2–0	0–2	0–0
Tampico	1–1	1–1	2–1	2–3	2–1	3–2	1–3	2–0	2–2	1–0	0–0	1–0	0–1	10–0	2–2	2–1	0–0	—	2–1	1–0	1–1	2–0	0–0	0–1
Tapatío	1–0	0–0	1–1	1–1	1–0	4–2	2–1	0–1	0–1	2–1	2–1	1–1	1–1	2–1	1–1	0–1	1–2	1–2	—	0–0	1–1	2–3	1–0	1–4
Tec. Celaya	4–2	1–1	3–1	0–0	3–1	2–0	4–1	0–2	1–0	0–2	0–0	4–1	0–1	3–1	0–0	2–1	3–0	0–1	1–1	—	4–1	3–2	2–1	2–1
Tepic	3–0	0–2	4–1	1–1	2–2	1–4	2–1	1–1	1–4	4–0	1–1	0–0	2–3	2–1	0–1	2–2	2–2	4–0	1–1	1–1	—	2–3	1–1	2–0
Tuberos	1–1	2–1	0–1	1–1	0–1	0–1	0–1	1–0	1–0	1–0	0–0	1–0	0–0	5–2	2–2	0–0	1–0	0–1	2–0	3–0	0–1	—	3–1	1–1
UAEM	0–0	1–1	1–1	2–1	4–0	2–2	5–1	3–1	1–1	2–2	3–1	1–0	0–1	4–2	1–0	3–2	2–0	0–0	3–0	2–2	5–4	3–1	—	1–0
Ciudad Victoria	1–1	0–0	2–0	2–2	4–0	1–1	2–0	1–0	0–2	1–1	2–1	1–0	2–0	1–1	2–2	2–2	0–0	1–1	1–1	1–2	2–1	1–1	1–2	—

Source: RSSSF
Legend: Blue = home team win; Yellow = draw; Red = away team win.

== Final stage ==
=== Group 1 ===
Pos	Team	Pld	W	D	L	GF	GA	GD	Pts	Promotion	ATL	UEM	NEC	TAM
1	Atlante (Q)	6	4	1	1	13	5	+8	9	Qualified to Promotion playoff		2–0	4–0	2–0
2	UAEM	6	4	0	2	12	9	+3	8	Qualified to Promotion playoff	2–1		2–0	3–0
3	Nuevo Necaxa	6	2	1	3	5	10	−5	5		1–1	3–1		1–0
4	Tampico	6	1	0	5	7	13	−6	2		2–3	3–4	2–0	

Source: RSSSF
Rules for classification: 1st points; 2nd head-to-head points; 3rd head-to-head goal difference; 4th head-to-head goals scored; 5th goal difference; 6th number of goals scored
(Q) Qualified for the phase indicated

=== Group 2 ===
Pos	Team	Pld	W	D	L	GF	GA	GD	Pts	Promotion	QUE	SAH	IRA	TEC
1	Querétaro (Q)	6	3	3	0	10	5	+5	9	Qualified to Promotion playoff		2–2	2–1	3–0
2	Ciudad Sahagún	6	2	3	1	9	8	+1	7	Qualified to Promotion playoff	1–1		2–2	3–2
3	Irapuato	6	2	1	3	8	9	−1	5		0–1	1–0		2–1
4	Tecnológico de Celaya	6	1	1	4	7	12	−5	3		1–1	0–1	3–2	

Source: RSSSF
Rules for classification: 1st points; 2nd head-to-head points; 3rd head-to-head goal difference; 4th head-to-head goals scored; 5th goal difference; 6th number of goals scored
(Q) Qualified for the phase indicated

=== Final ===
May 31, 1977

Atlante	4–2	Querétaro
	Report

Estadio Azteca, Mexico City

June 5, 1977

Querétaro	1–2	Atlante
	Report

Estadio Municipal de Querétaro, Querétaro City
