= 1974–75 Mexican Segunda División season =

Segunda División de México
- Season: 1974–75
- Champions: UAG (1st Title)
- Promoted: Celaya; Deportivo Acapulco; Inter Acapulco; Tecnológico de Celaya; Atlético Tepeji del Río; Iguala; Ciudad Sahagún; Córdoba; UAT
- Relegated: Deportivo Acapulco; Ciudad Sahagún; Iguala
- Matches played: 613
- Goals scored: 1,742 (2.84 per match)
- Top goalscorer: Raúl Ángel Mañón (37 goals)

The 1974–75 Segunda División was the 26th season of the Mexican Segunda División. The season started on 14 July 1974 and concluded on 5 July 1975. It was won by UAG.

== Changes ==
- UANL was promoted to Primera División as Segunda División winners.
- U. de G. bought the franchise belonging to Torreón and was promoted to Primera Division.
- Unión de Curtidores and U. de S.L.P. were invited to the Primera Division due to an expansion of teams, as the league went from 18 to 20 teams.
- San Luis was relegated from Primera División.
- UAEM was relegated from Segunda División.
- Celaya, Deportivo Acapulco, Inter Acapulco, Tecnológico de Celaya, Atlético Tepeji del Río, Iguala, Ciudad Sahagún, Córdoba, and UAT were promoted from Tercera División.
- Pachuca was on hiatus for this season.
- Zamora requested to play in the Tercera División for internal reasons.
- Halcones Saltillo joined as an expansion team.

== Teams ==
1974–75 season Teams

Club	City	Stadium
Acapulco	Acapulco	Unidad Deportiva Acapulco
Atlético Morelia	Morelia	Estadio Venustiano Carranza
Atlético Tepeji del Río	Tepeji del Río	Estadio Tepeji
Celaya	Celaya	Estadio Miguel Alemán Valdés
Córdoba	Córdoba	Estadio Rafael Murillo Vidal
Cuautla	Cuautla	Estadio Isidro Gil Tapia
Halcones Saltillo	Saltillo	Estadio Olímpico Francisco I. Madero
Iguala	Iguala	Estadio General Ambrosio Figueroa
Inter Acapulco	Acapulco	Unidad Deportiva Acapulco
Irapuato	Irapuato	Estadio Irapuato
La Piedad	La Piedad	Estadio Juan N. López
Nacional	Guadalajara	Estadio Tecnológico U. de G.
Naucalpan	Naucalpan	Unidad Cuauhtémoc
Nuevo Necaxa	Juan Galindo	Estadio 14 de Diciembre
Querétaro	Querétaro City	Estadio Municipal de Querétaro
Ciudad Sahagún	Ciudad Sahagún	Estadio Fray Bernardino de Sahagún
Salamanca	Salamanca	Estadio El Molinito
San Luis	San Luis Potosí City	Estadio Plan de San Luis
Tampico	Tampico	Estadio Tamaulipas
Tecnológico de Celaya	Celaya	Estadio Miguel Alemán Valdés
UAG	Zapopan	Estadio Tres de Marzo
UAT	Ciudad Victoria	Estadio Marte R. Gómez
U. de N.	Tepic	Estadio Nicolás Álvarez Ortega
Ciudad Victoria	Ciudad Victoria	Estadio Marte R. Gómez

== Group stage ==
=== Group 1 ===
Pos	Team	Pld	W	D	L	GF	GA	GD	Pts	Qualification or relegation
1	Irapuato (Q)	46	31	13	2	86	27	+59	75	Qualified to Championship Group
2	Querétaro (Q)	46	27	10	9	95	41	+54	64	Qualified to Championship Group
3	Ciudad Victoria	46	20	15	11	73	51	+22	55	
4	La Piedad	46	19	14	13	57	50	+7	52	
5	Cuautla	46	13	10	23	59	96	−37	36	
6	Salamanca	46	11	12	23	60	78	−18	34	
7	Inter Acapulco	46	11	11	24	53	85	−32	33	
8	Córdoba	46	12	7	27	58	96	−38	31	

Source: RSSSF
(Q) Qualified for the phase indicated

=== Group 2 ===
Pos	Team	Pld	W	D	L	GF	GA	GD	Pts	Qualification or relegation
1	Nuevo Necaxa (Q)	46	26	14	6	79	37	+42	66	Qualified to Championship Group
2	Naucalpan (Q)	46	24	13	9	89	51	+38	61	Qualified to Championship Group
3	Atlético Morelia	46	18	14	14	64	46	+18	50	
4	Universidad de Nayarit	46	15	17	14	77	70	+7	47	
5	Atlético Tepeji del Río	46	16	15	15	51	50	+1	47	
6	Celaya	46	13	14	19	69	77	−8	40	
7	Iguala	46	11	8	27	48	86	−38	30	Relegation Playoff
8	Ciudad Sahagún	46	7	14	25	41	84	−43	28	Relegation Playoff

Source: RSSSF
(Q) Qualified for the phase indicated

=== Group 3 ===
Pos	Team	Pld	W	D	L	GF	GA	GD	Pts	Qualification or relegation
1	San Luis (Q)	46	30	8	8	100	48	+52	68	Qualified to Championship Group
2	UAG (Q)	46	29	9	8	100	51	+49	67	Qualified to Championship Group
3	Nacional	46	18	13	15	73	68	+5	49	
4	Halcones Saltillo	46	16	13	17	80	69	+11	45	
5	Tecnológico de Celaya	46	14	9	23	69	96	−27	37	
6	Tampico	46	12	9	25	52	76	−24	33	
7	UAT	46	11	9	26	70	108	−38	31	
8	Acapulco (R)	46	8	9	29	44	106	−62	25	Relegated

Source: RSSSF
(Q) Qualified for the phase indicated; (R) Relegated

== Results ==
Home \ Away	ACA	ATM	ATP	CEL	CÓR	CUA	HSL	IGU	INT	IRA	LPD	NAC	NAU	NEC	QUE	SAH	SAL	SNL	TAM	TEC	UAG	UAT	UDN	VIC
Acapulco	—	0–0	0–0	1–0	2–0	2–2	2–0	0–1	1–1	0–1	1–2	0–4	1–0	0–1	0–6	1–1	1–2	1–3	0–2	5–1	1–4	1–2	1–1	1–1
Atlético Morelia	8–1	—	3–0	1–0	3–2	3–2	5–3	1–0	1–2	0–1	2–2	1–2	1–0	0–0	1–2	1–0	1–1	2–3	2–1	4–0	1–2	0–0	3–2	1–0
Atlético Tepeji	2–1	0–0	—	1–0	2–1	1–1	2–1	2–1	2–1	1–1	0–0	1–2	1–1	0–0	3–4	4–0	3–1	1–0	1–1	2–0	0–2	3–4	0–0	1–1
Celaya	4–2	0–2	1–1	—	2–0	5–0	1–2	1–0	2–0	0–0	1–2	3–1	0–1	2–1	4–3	0–2	2–1	2–2	1–1	2–2	1–2	4–3	2–2	0–0
Córdoba	3–2	2–1	0–2	1–2	—	3–4	1–3	6–0	1–0	0–0	2–0	2–0	0–3	1–3	0–2	5–2	1–1	0–1	0–2	1–2	1–1	1–1	1–3	0–2
Cuautla	0–3	2–1	2–1	2–1	0–3	—	4–2	2–0	4–1	0–2	2–2	3–1	0–2	1–3	1–1	1–1	1–0	2–3	2–2	4–0	1–1	2–1	2–0	1–1
Halcones Saltillo	7–0	1–1	0–1	1–0	0–1	6–0	—	4–1	1–1	0–1	3–2	0–1	0–0	0–3	0–2	4–2	0–1	2–3	1–1	1–1	2–2	5–0	3–1	3–0
Iguala	1–0	1–0	2–0	2–2	0–2	2–0	1–1	—	2–1	0–1	2–1	2–4	0–0	1–3	2–2	4–0	1–0	2–4	2–2	1–2	1–0	0–1	2–3	0–4
Inter Acapulco	1–0	0–1	1–1	3–1	1–2	2–2	1–2	2–1	—	0–3	0–0	0–0	1–1	1–2	0–0	2–1	2–2	0–4	4–2	3–1	1–3	2–3	2–2	1–2
Irapuato	6–1	1–1	1–0	2–1	2–1	4–1	2–2	3–1	3–1	—	4–0	2–1	2–1	0–0	2–0	5–0	1–3	2–0	2–1	2–0	2–2	6–1	2–0	3–0
La Piedad	3–0	0–0	1–0	2–2	2–1	2–1	2–0	2–1	2–0	0–1	—	1–1	4–2	1–2	1–1	3–0	2–1	2–1	2–1	2–0	1–1	4–2	2–0	1–0
Nacional	2–1	0–0	1–2	2–1	1–1	1–0	1–1	3–1	3–1	1–1	0–0	—	0–3	2–1	0–1	3–3	5–1	0–0	1–0	4–2	1–2	5–2	0–0	2–2
Naucalpan	4–0	1–0	2–1	1–1	6–1	3–0	2–1	2–1	5–0	2–2	0–0	2–2	—	0–0	2–1	2–0	3–2	1–4	5–0	3–0	0–2	5–1	1–1	3–1
Nuevo Necaxa	3–0	1–0	2–0	1–3	2–1	1–0	2–2	2–0	5–1	0–0	1–0	2–0	0–0	—	1–0	2–0	0–0	0–0	3–2	3–3	2–1	7–3	2–2	0–1
Querétaro	0–0	1–0	1–0	3–0	3–0	5–0	1–1	5–2	3–0	2–0	1–0	4–1	2–3	0–0	—	3–0	2–1	1–1	4–0	1–2	3–2	5–0	1–0	1–0
Ciudad Sahagún	2–2	2–3	1–1	1–2	0–0	0–0	0–1	1–1	1–0	0–1	2–2	0–3	0–1	0–2	3–3	—	2–2	0–1	3–1	1–3	1–3	1–0	1–1	0–0
Salamanca	2–0	1–3	0–2	3–3	2–3	3–0	1–2	1–1	1–2	1–1	0–1	2–3	3–1	2–1	0–6	3–3	—	0–1	3–2	4–1	0–1	1–0	3–0	0–1
San Luis	4–1	1–0	4–0	4–2	10–0	2–0	3–1	4–1	2–1	1–3	3–0	2–0	2–2	1–0	1–1	1–0	3–1	—	1–2	1–1	2–1	4–2	2–1	4–1
Tampico	1–2	1–1	0–2	1–0	2–0	5–1	0–1	3–1	1–2	0–1	0–0	1–0	2–3	0–4	0–3	0–1	1–1	1–1	—	2–0	1–2	2–1	1–3	1–0
Tec. Celaya	3–2	1–2	0–0	3–1	4–1	1–2	2–4	2–0	0–1	0–0	3–0	3–4	2–4	3–4	2–3	2–0	0–0	2–0	1–0	—	2–1	1–5	3–2	2–2
UAG	4–0	2–1	1–0	6–1	3–2	6–1	5–1	3–1	2–3	0–3	2–1	2–1	1–2	0–0	1–0	1–0	0–0	3–2	5–0	2–0	—	4–0	2–1	1–1
UAT	0–1	1–1	2–2	0–0	3–2	3–2	1–1	0–1	4–2	0–1	1–0	4–1	2–2	2–3	0–1	0–1	3–2	0–2	0–1	3–3	2–4	—	4–6	0–1
U. de N.	6–2	0–0	0–1	3–3	2–2	2–1	2–2	3–0	1–1	1–3	2–0	1–1	2–0	1–1	2–1	1–2	3–1	0–2	2–1	5–2	2–2	3–1	—	0–0
Ciudad Victoria	5–1	1–1	2–1	3–3	7–0	2–0	3–2	1–1	2–1	0–0	0–0	4–2	3–2	0–3	2–0	3–0	3–0	3–0	1–0	2–1	2–3	2–2	1–2	—

Source: RSSSF
Legend: Blue = home team win; Yellow = draw; Red = away team win.

== Championship Group ==
Pos	Team	Pld	W	D	L	GF	GA	GD	Pts	Promotion	IRA	UAG	SNL	NEC	NAU	QUE
1	Irapuato (Q)	10	6	1	3	17	13	+4	13	Qualified to Promotion playoff		0–2	2–1	2–1	3–2	3–1
2	UAG (Q)	10	5	3	2	18	14	+4	13	Qualified to Promotion playoff	1–2		2–2	2–1	3–2	2–0
3	San Luis	10	4	3	3	17	12	+5	11		1–0	1–1		3–1	4–0	2–2
4	Nuevo Necaxa	10	5	0	5	18	16	+2	10		2–1	3–1	3–0		4–2	1–0
5	Naucalpan	10	2	4	4	13	18	−5	8		0–0	2–2	1–0	2–0		1–1
6	Querétaro	10	1	3	6	11	21	−10	5		2–4	1–2	0–3	3–2	1–1	

Source: RSSSF
Rules for classification: 1st points; 2nd head-to-head points; 3rd head-to-head goal difference; 4th head-to-head goals scored; 5th goal difference; 6th number of goals scored
(Q) Qualified for the phase indicated

=== Final ===
July 4, 1975

UAG	1–0	Irapuato
Salvador Barba 52'	Report

Estadio Azteca, Mexico City

== Relegation Playoffs ==
Playoffs
23	Ciudad Sahagún	1	1	1
2	Estudiantes Querétaro	1	2	3
22	Iguala	0	1	1
3	Tapatío	1	1	4

Winners
2	Estudiantes Querétaro
3	Tapatío
