= 1972–73 Mexican Segunda División season =

Segunda División de México
- Season: 1972–73
- Champions: Ciudad Madero (2nd Title)
- Promoted: Orizaba; Tecnológico Celaya; U. de G. UAEM
- Relegated: Orizaba; Tec Celaya
- Matches played: 318
- Goals scored: 936 (2.94 per match)
- Top goalscorer: Marino Guevara; José de Jesús Damían (22 goals)

The 1972–73 Segunda División was the 24th season of the Mexican Segunda División. The season started on 26 November 1972 and concluded on 5 July 1973. It was won by Ciudad Madero.

As of this season, the promotion playoff was established between the Second and Third Division. The penultimate and antepenultimate classified of this category had to play a series against the second and third place of the Third Division.

== Changes ==
- Atlas was promoted to Primera División.
- Irapuato was relegated from Segunda División.
- Universidad Veracruzana was relegated from Segunda División.
- Orizaba, Tecnológico de Celaya, U. de G. and UAEM were promoted from Tercera División.
- Lobos Querétaro was disqualified for debts with the FMF.
- La Piedad and Nacional asked for hiatus and did not take part in this season.
- Tepic was renamed as Universidad de Nayarit.

== Teams ==
1972–73 season Teams

Club	City	Stadium
Atlético Cuernavaca	Cuernavaca	Estadio Centenario
Cuautla	Cuautla	Estadio Isidro Gil Tapia
Irapuato	Irapuato	Estadio Irapuato
Ciudad Madero	Ciudad Madero	Estadio Tamaulipas
Morelia	Morelia	Estadio Venustiano Carranza
Naucalpan	Naucalpan	Unidad Cuauhtémoc
Orizaba	Orizaba	Estadio Socum
Querétaro	Querétaro City	Estadio Municipal de Querétaro
Salamanca	Salamanca	Estadio El Molinito
Tampico	Tampico	Estadio Tamaulipas
Tecnológico de Celaya	Celaya	Estadio Miguel Alemán Valdés
Unión de Curtidores	León	Estadio La Martinica
UAEM	Toluca	Estadio Universitario Alberto "Chivo" Córdoba
UANL	Monterrey	Estadio Universitario
U. de G.	Guadalajara	Estadio Tecnológico U. de G.
U. de N.	Tepic	Estadio Nicolás Álvarez Ortega
Ciudad Victoria	Ciudad Victoria	Estadio Marte R. Gómez
Zamora	Zamora	Estadio Moctezuma

== Group stage ==
=== Group A ===
Pos	Team	Pld	W	D	L	GF	GA	GD	Pts	Qualification or relegation
1	Ciudad Madero (Q)	34	18	8	8	50	34	+16	44	Qualified to Playoffs
2	UANL (Q)	34	17	8	9	56	31	+25	42	Qualified to Playoffs
3	Naucalpan	34	16	8	10	70	51	+19	40	
4	Unión de Curtidores	34	11	16	7	54	48	+6	38	
5	U. de G.	34	11	12	11	51	42	+9	34	
6	Zamora	34	11	11	12	51	62	−11	33	
7	UAEM	34	7	15	12	36	39	−3	29	
8	Ciudad Victoria	34	7	14	13	37	54	−17	28	
9	Atlético Cuernavaca (R)	34	7	5	22	38	88	−50	19	Relegated

Source: RSSSF
(Q) Qualified for the phase indicated; (R) Relegated

=== Group 1 ===
Pos	Team	Pld	W	D	L	GF	GA	GD	Pts	Qualification or relegation
1	Irapuato (Q)	34	17	9	8	69	38	+31	43	Qualified to Playoffs
2	Querétaro (Q)	34	15	12	7	62	39	+23	42	Qualified to Playoffs
3	Morelia	34	17	8	9	47	33	+14	42	
4	Tampico	34	16	7	11	48	34	+14	39	
5	Cuautla	34	13	6	15	53	59	−6	32	
6	Salamanca	34	10	11	13	53	61	−8	31	
7	Universidad de Nayarit	34	10	8	16	51	59	−8	28	
8	Tecnológico de Celaya	34	9	9	16	53	72	−19	27	Relegation Playoffs
9	Orizaba	34	8	5	21	44	79	−35	21	Relegation Playoffs

Source: RSSSF
(Q) Qualified for the phase indicated

== Results ==
Home \ Away	ATC	CUA	IRA	MAD	MOR	NAU	ORI	QUE	SAL	TAM	TEC	UDC	UEM	UNL	UDG	UDN	VIC	ZAM
Atl. Cuernavaca	—	0–1	1–0	0–1	1–2	3–2	0–4	1–8	4–3	1–0	2–2	0–0	0–0	1–2	1–1	0–3	0–1	0–0
Cuautla	5–2	—	1–1	1–0	6–1	5–1	2–0	0–2	2–3	2–1	4–2	1–2	1–4	1–0	0–1	1–1	1–1	2–2
Irapuato	2–1	5–0	—	2–0	2–1	1–0	6–2	1–1	2–0	2–0	6–0	0–2	3–1	2–4	1–0	5–1	7–2	3–1
Ciudad Madero	4–2	5–1	1–0	—	0–2	1–0	3–0	1–1	2–1	3–2	4–1	0–0	0–0	1–0	1–1	2–1	0–0	3–1
Morelia	5–3	2–0	0–0	0–1	—	1–1	3–0	3–0	0–1	2–1	3–0	1–0	1–1	3–2	3–0	3–2	1–0	1–1
Naucalpan	6–1	4–3	1–1	2–1	2–0	—	3–1	1–0	4–1	2–0	5–3	2–2	4–2	0–1	3–0	3–2	2–1	2–1
Orizaba	1–2	3–3	2–0	1–2	0–1	1–2	—	2–6	3–3	0–1	2–1	3–2	1–0	0–1	2–1	1–6	2–1	2–2
Querétaro	3–0	2–0	2–4	1–2	0–0	3–2	0–0	—	1–1	2–0	4–2	0–0	2–1	0–0	0–0	3–0	3–1	4–1
Salamanca	1–3	3–0	1–1	2–0	1–1	4–4	3–2	0–2	—	0–0	0–1	1–2	0–2	0–4	1–0	2–1	6–1	2–3
Tampico	4–1	1–2	2–1	0–0	1–0	2–1	2–2	1–0	4–1	—	2–1	3–2	1–1	2–0	2–0	5–0	2–0	2–0
Tec. Celaya	4–0	3–1	1–2	2–1	2–3	1–5	4–1	2–2	1–1	0–0	—	0–0	1–2	2–2	2–5	2–2	0–1	2–3
Unión de Curtidores	5–2	2–0	2–2	4–4	1–1	1–1	1–0	1–2	1–2	1–0	1–1	—	2–1	2–1	2–1	2–2	0–0	1–3
UAEM	5–0	0–2	1–1	0–1	1–0	0–0	0–0	1–1	1–2	0–0	1–2	2–2	—	3–1	0–0	0–0	0–0	1–0
UANL	4–0	0–1	1–0	2–1	0–0	1–1	4–0	0–0	2–0	1–1	0–1	4–2	4–0	—	1–1	3–2	1–0	2–0
U. de G.	5–1	2–1	2–2	0–1	1–2	1–0	5–1	2–2	1–1	0–1	1–1	3–3	2–1	1–2	—	4–0	5–2	0–0
U. de N.	1–0	0–1	1–2	1–2	1–0	0–0	4–1	4–1	1–1	1–1	1–2	1–2	2–1	0–0	0–2	—	2–3	4–2
Ciudad Victoria	2–1	0–0	1–1	1–1	0–1	3–2	1–2	2–2	1–1	1–2	2–0	1–1	1–1	2–1	2–2	1–2	—	0–0
Zamora	1–4	3–2	2–1	2–1	1–0	3–2	2–1	2–0	4–4	1–0	1–1	3–3	2–2	1–5	0–1	1–2	2–2	—

Source: RSSSF
Legend: Blue = home team win; Yellow = draw; Red = away team win.

== Promotion Playoff ==
Semi-finals
1	Irapuato	2	1	3
3	UANL	1	0	1
2	Ciudad Madero	1	3	4
4	Querétaro	2	1	3

Final
1	Irapuato	0	0	0
2	Ciudad Madero	0	2	2

=== Final ===
July 1, 1973

Ciudad Madero	0–0	Irapuato
	Report

Estadio Tamaulipas, Tampico and Ciudad Madero

July 5, 1972

Irapuato	0–2	Ciudad Madero
	Report	Aurelio Barajas; Elías Aguilar

Estadio Irapuato, Irapuato

== Relegation Playoff ==
Playoffs
16	Tecnológico de Celaya	3	2	5 (3)
3	Universidad de San Luis (p.)	3	2	5 (4)
17	Orizaba	0	3	3
2	Nuevo Necaxa	1	4	5

Winners
3	Universidad de San Luis
2	Nuevo Necaxa
