= 1977–78 Mexican Segunda División season =

Segunda División de México
- Season: 1977–78
- Champions: Zacatepec (4th Title)
- Promoted: Estado de México
- Relegated: Ciudad Victoria
- Matches played: 578
- Goals scored: 1,618 (2.8 per match)
- Top goalscorer: Ricardo Castro (27 goals)

The 1977–78 Segunda División was the 29th season of the Mexican Segunda División. The season started on 8 July 1977 and concluded on 7 May 1978. It was won by Zacatepec.

Starting this season, 3 points were awarded for victory with more than two goals difference.

== Changes ==
- Atlante was promoted to Primera División.
- Zacatepec was relegated from Primera División.
- Estado de México was promoted from Tercera División.
- Celaya was relegated from Segunda División.
- Córdoba was renamed as Universidad Veracruzana de Córdoba.
- Ciudad Sahagún was bought by new owners, the club was moved to Acapulco and renamed as Inter Acapulco.

=== During the season ===
- After Week 4, Tampico was promoted to the Primera Division after purchasing the San Luis franchise. The place of Tampico was purchased by Bachilleres.
- After Week 15, the UAEM franchise was bought by new owners, the club was relocated at Ciudad Nezahualcóyotl and renamed as Coyotes Neza.

== Teams ==
1977–78 season Teams

Club	City	Stadium
Atlético Morelia	Morelia	Estadio Venustiano Carranza
Bravos	Ciudad Madero	Estadio Tamaulipas
Colima	Colima City	Estadio Colima
Cuautla	Cuautla	Estadio Isidro Gil Tapia
Estado de México	Toluca	Estadio Toluca 70
Estudiantes Querétaro	Querétaro City	Estadio Municipal de Querétaro
Inter Acapulco	Acapulco	Unidad Deportiva Acapulco
Irapuato	Irapuato	Estadio Irapuato
La Piedad	La Piedad	Estadio Juan N. López
Morelos	Cuernavaca	Estadio Centenario
Nacional	Ciudad Guzmán	Estadio Municipal Santa Rosa
Nuevo Necaxa	Juan Galindo	Estadio 14 de Diciembre
Pachuca	Pachuca	Estadio Revolución Mexicana
Querétaro	Querétaro City	Estadio Municipal de Querétaro
Salamanca	Salamanca	Estadio El Molinito
Tampico; Bachilleres	Tampico; Ocotlán	Estadio Tamaulipas; Estadio Municipal de Ocotlán
Tapatío	Guadalajara	Casa Club Guadalajara
Tecnológico de Celaya	Celaya	Estadio Miguel Alemán Valdés
Tepic	Tepic	Estadio Nicolás Álvarez Ortega
Tuberos de Veracruz	Veracruz City	Estadio Veracruzano
UAEM; Coyotes Neza	Toluca; Ciudad Nezahualcóyotl	Estadio Toluca 70; Estadio Metropolitano
U.V. Córdoba	Córdoba	Estadio Rafael Murillo Vidal
Ciudad Victoria	Ciudad Victoria	Estadio Marte R. Gómez
Zacatepec	Zacatepec	Estadio Agustín "Coruco" Díaz

== Group stage ==
=== Group 1 ===
Pos	Team	Pld	W	D	L	GF	GA	GD	Pts	Qualification or relegation
1	Zacatepec (Q)	46	32	13	1	99	25	+74	98	Qualified to Championship Group
2	Morelos (Q)	46	22	14	10	70	40	+30	72	Qualified to Championship Group
3	Tapatío	46	17	13	16	71	71	0	55	
4	Colima	46	14	17	15	70	70	0	51	
5	Estudiantes de Querétaro	46	15	11	20	59	77	−18	50	
6	Tepic	46	13	15	18	52	70	−18	46	

Source: RSSSF
(Q) Qualified for the phase indicated

=== Group 2 ===
Pos	Team	Pld	W	D	L	GF	GA	GD	Pts	Qualification or relegation
1	Atlético Morelia (Q)	46	22	13	11	65	45	+20	64	Qualified to Championship Group
2	La Piedad (Q)	46	19	11	16	76	65	+11	61	Qualified to Championship Group
3	Nuevo Necaxa	46	16	12	18	59	54	+5	50	
4	Tecnológico de Celaya	46	9	13	24	57	91	−34	39	
5	Pachuca	46	8	12	26	46	81	−35	33	
6	Inter Acapulco	46	10	10	26	44	86	−42	33	

Source: RSSSF
(Q) Qualified for the phase indicated

=== Group 3 ===
Pos	Team	Pld	W	D	L	GF	GA	GD	Pts	Qualification or relegation
1	Tuberos de Veracruz (Q)	46	23	11	12	78	49	+29	68	Qualified to Championship Group
2	Salamanca (Q)	46	20	13	13	65	54	+11	62	Qualified to Championship Group
3	Querétaro	46	18	13	15	61	52	+9	59	
4	Nacional	46	15	17	14	62	57	+5	57	
5	Tampico / Bachilleres	46	17	14	15	72	72	0	57	
6	Bravos	46	15	12	19	58	70	−12	50	

Source: RSSSF
(Q) Qualified for the phase indicated

=== Group 4 ===
Pos	Team	Pld	W	D	L	GF	GA	GD	Pts	Qualification or relegation
1	Irapuato (Q)	46	25	14	7	99	48	+51	79	Qualified to Championship Group
2	Estado de México (Q)	46	17	15	14	69	66	+3	56	Qualified to Championship Group
3	Potros UAEM / Coyotes Neza	46	14	19	13	58	54	+4	53	
4	Cuautla	46	16	14	16	60	67	−7	53	
5	U.V. Córdoba	46	11	12	23	55	78	−23	38	
6	Ciudad Victoria	46	5	10	31	33	96	−63	21	Relegated

Source: RSSSF
(Q) Qualified for the phase indicated

== Results ==
Home \ Away	ATM	BRA	COL	CUA	EDM	ESQ	INT	IRA	LPD	MOR	NAC	NEC	PAC	QUE	SAL	TAB	TAP	TEC	TEP	TUB	UCN	UVC	VIC	ZAC
Atlético Morelia	—	1–0	1–0	2–4	1–1	0–0	1–0	1–0	3–0	3–1	0–0	2–2	1–0	3–2	2–0	0–0	2–1	2–2	2–1	1–2	3–1	2–0	6–1	0–0
Bravos	1–0	—	0–0	3–0	0–1	2–0	4–1	1–1	2–0	1–0	1–1	2–1	3–0	1–1	2–1	2–3	1–3	5–1	2–0	1–1	0–0	1–1	2–1	0–3
Colima	1–1	1–1	—	1–3	1–0	7–1	3–1	2–1	3–1	1–1	1–1	1–1	2–1	1–0	1–1	1–1	2–1	4–1	1–1	2–4	1–0	5–2	3–3	1–1
Cuautla	2–1	1–2	2–2	—	2–2	3–0	1–1	1–1	3–1	0–0	1–1	0–0	6–0	0–3	1–0	1–0	3–0	3–2	1–1	1–3	1–0	1–1	3–1	0–4
Estado de México	2–1	6–1	1–1	0–1	—	0–0	3–3	2–2	2–1	1–0	1–1	3–2	3–0	2–1	2–1	2–2	2–4	1–1	3–1	1–0	2–2	4–1	1–1	1–2
Estudiantes Qro.	1–3	3–1	1–0	3–1	0–2	—	1–1	0–1	0–1	1–3	3–1	1–2	0–0	2–0	3–1	1–1	3–2	4–1	1–2	0–1	3–3	1–0	2–0	1–3
Inter Acapulco	0–1	3–1	2–3	2–1	1–1	1–1	—	1–0	0–2	0–5	2–1	0–1	2–1	0–0	0–1	1–0	1–0	0–0	1–2	2–2	1–0	1–4	3–0	0–2
Irapuato	1–1	6–1	3–2	4–0	5–0	2–2	5–1	—	5–1	1–0	4–0	1–0	1–0	2–0	4–4	5–1	1–1	4–2	4–0	1–0	2–0	3–0	3–0	0–0
La Piedad	1–0	3–0	2–1	3–1	3–0	0–2	4–2	2–1	—	1–1	0–0	0–0	6–0	1–1	0–0	1–1	2–3	2–0	1–1	2–3	2–1	2–0	2–1	1–1
Morelos	1–1	4–0	2–1	1–0	1–1	3–1	1–0	1–0	2–1	—	2–0	2–0	1–0	0–2	2–1	3–0	1–1	3–1	2–0	1–1	1–1	3–0	2–0	2–0
Nacional	4–2	0–0	2–2	1–1	1–0	2–0	3–0	1–1	5–4	3–3	—	0–1	2–0	0–0	1–1	3–1	3–0	3–1	4–2	1–2	1–2	0–1	4–0	0–0
Nuevo Necaxa	0–1	1–1	3–1	1–2	2–0	0–2	2–0	2–2	2–3	0–1	2–1	—	2–3	1–0	2–3	0–1	1–0	2–1	5–0	0–1	0–0	2–1	5–1	0–1
Pachuca	1–1	0–1	0–1	1–2	2–1	3–1	1–1	2–2	3–2	1–3	0–3	2–2	—	1–1	0–1	2–2	1–1	3–1	2–0	3–0	1–3	1–2	3–1	0–2
Querétaro	1–2	4–1	0–0	2–0	2–0	0–1	3–1	2–2	0–2	1–1	4–3	0–0	1–0	—	0–0	3–2	3–1	2–1	4–1	2–1	2–2	1–0	4–1	0–0
Salamanca	0–1	1–0	0–2	2–0	1–1	2–0	2–0	1–3	1–1	2–1	2–0	1–1	3–1	1–0	—	2–1	5–1	3–1	2–2	1–0	2–1	1–1	2–0	2–3
Tampico/Bachilleres	3–2	0–5	5–3	3–0	0–3	2–1	3–1	1–2	2–1	4–2	1–1	1–1	1–1	1–3	2–0	—	1–1	1–0	3–1	3–1	1–0	3–2	3–0	1–2
Tapatío	1–0	3–0	3–1	3–1	2–5	2–3	3–1	1–1	2–2	1–0	0–1	2–2	2–1	1–1	2–1	2–1	—	7–0	2–2	0–0	1–2	1–0	3–0	0–0
Tec. Celaya	2–1	0–0	4–1	1–1	1–2	2–2	2–0	3–1	0–2	1–1	4–0	2–0	1–1	1–2	0–4	0–0	0–0	—	0–1	2–2	0–1	1–2	3–1	2–2
Tepic	0–1	2–1	1–0	1–1	0–1	4–1	0–0	2–3	2–1	2–0	0–0	2–1	1–0	3–0	0–0	0–2	1–1	0–0	—	2–2	1–1	3–0	2–0	1–3
Tuberos	1–2	1–0	2–0	1–1	5–2	2–2	3–0	1–2	3–0	0–0	0–0	0–2	3–0	3–2	1–1	2–1	4–0	6–0	3–0	—	1–0	3–2	2–1	1–2
UAEM/Coyotes Neza	2–2	3–2	1–1	4–1	2–0	0–0	2–1	2–2	1–1	2–1	0–0	1–0	1–1	0–1	2–3	1–1	3–1	2–0	2–2	2–1	—	2–2	2–0	1–4
U.V. Córdoba	0–1	2–2	1–0	1–1	1–0	4–2	1–3	1–2	1–0	1–1	0–1	2–3	2–2	4–0	1–2	3–1	2–3	1–3	0–0	0–1	0–0	—	2–2	1–1
Ciudad Victoria	0–0	2–1	2–2	0–1	1–1	1–2	3–1	0–2	1–4	0–3	0–1	0–1	2–1	1–0	0–0	2–2	0–1	1–4	2–1	0–3	0–0	0–1	—	0–2
Zacatepec	2–1	3–0	4–0	1–0	3–0	5–0	6–1	2–0	1–1	0–0	2–0	3–1	1–0	1–0	4–0	2–2	4–1	5–1	4–1	1–0	1–0	6–1	0–0	—

Source: RSSSF
Legend: Blue = home team win; Yellow = draw; Red = away team win.

== Final stage ==
=== Group 1 ===
Pos	Team	Pld	W	D	L	GF	GA	GD	Pts	Promotion	ZAC	TUB	MOR	SAL
1	Zacatepec (Q)	6	5	0	1	9	1	+8	13	Qualified to Final		2–0	1–0	2–0
2	Tuberos de Veracruz	6	3	1	2	9	9	0	8		1–0		3–3	3–1
3	Morelos	6	2	1	3	8	10	−2	7		0–3	2–0		1–3
4	Salamanca	6	1	0	5	5	11	−6	3		0–1	1–2	0–2	

Source: RSSSF
Rules for classification: 1st points; 2nd head-to-head points; 3rd head-to-head goal difference; 4th head-to-head goals scored; 5th goal difference; 6th number of goals scored
(Q) Qualified for the phase indicated

=== Group 2 ===
Pos	Team	Pld	W	D	L	GF	GA	GD	Pts	Promotion	IRA	EDM	ATM	LPD
1	Irapuato (Q)	6	2	3	1	12	8	+4	8	Qualified to Final		2–1	1–1	5–1
2	Estado de México	6	2	2	2	10	9	+1	7		1–1		4–2	3–2
3	Atlético Morelia	6	1	3	2	13	13	0	6		3–3	0–0		4–1
4	La Piedad	6	3	0	3	11	16	−5	6		1–0	2–1	4–3	

Source: RSSSF
Rules for classification: 1st points; 2nd head-to-head points; 3rd head-to-head goal difference; 4th head-to-head goals scored; 5th goal difference; 6th number of goals scored
(Q) Qualified for the phase indicated

=== Final ===
April 30, 1978

Irapuato	0–1	Zacatepec
	Report	Ricardo Márquez

Estadio Irapuato, Irapuato

May 7, 1978

Zacatepec	3–1	Irapuato
Mario Hernández 24', 76'; Ricardo Márquez 72'	Report	Maurilio García 77' (pen.)

Estadio Agustín "Coruco" Díaz, Zacatepec
