= 1971–72 Mexican Segunda División season =

Segunda División de México
- Season: 1971–72
- Champions: Atlas (2nd Title)
- Promoted: Lobos Querétaro
- Relegated: Universidad Veracruzana
- Matches: 316
- Goals: 853 (2.7 per match)
- Top goalscorer: Ricardo Chavarín (26 goals)

The 1971–72 Segunda División was the 23rd season of the Mexican Segunda División. The season started on 27 October 1971 and concluded on 26 July 1972. It was won by Atlas.

As of this season, the format of the league changed, there were created two groups, the first and second place of each must play a playoff series for the championship, at the same time the two last teams of each group must play a playoff relegation series. However, the matches between all the teams in the league were maintained.

== Changes ==
- San Luis was promoted to Primera División.
- Atlas was relegated from Primera División.
- Nuevo León was relegated from Segunda División.
- Lobos Querétaro was promoted from Tercera División.

== Teams ==
1971–72 season Teams

Club	City	Stadium
Atlas	Guadalajara	Estadio Jalisco
Atlético Cuernavaca	Cuernavaca	Estadio Centenario
Cuautla	Cuautla	Estadio Isidro Gil Tapia
La Piedad	La Piedad	Estadio Juan N. López
Lobos Querétaro	Querétaro City	Estadio Municipal de Querétaro
Ciudad Madero	Ciudad Madero	Estadio Tamaulipas
Morelia	Morelia	Estadio Venustiano Carranza
Nacional	Guadalajara	Estadio Jalisco
Naucalpan	Naucalpan	Unidad Cuauhtémoc
Querétaro	Querétaro City	Estadio Municipal de Querétaro
Salamanca	Salamanca	Estadio El Molinito
Tampico	Tampico	Estadio Tamaulipas
Tepic	Tepic	Estadio Nicolás Álvarez Ortega
Unión de Curtidores	León	Estadio La Martinica
UANL	Monterrey	Estadio Universitario
Universidad Veracruzana	Xalapa	Estadio Antonio M. Quirasco
Ciudad Victoria	Ciudad Victoria	Estadio Marte R. Gómez
Zamora	Zamora	Estadio Moctezuma

== Group stage ==
=== Group A ===
Pos	Team	Pld	W	D	L	GF	GA	GD	Pts	Qualification or relegation
1	UANL (Q)	34	18	5	11	52	36	+16	41	Qualified to Playoffs
2	Zamora (Q)	34	14	12	8	37	29	+8	40	Qualified to Playoffs
3	La Piedad	34	14	12	8	36	32	+4	40	
4	Naucalpan	34	15	9	10	67	43	+24	39	
5	Ciudad Madero	34	12	11	11	51	58	−7	35	
6	Nacional	34	8	15	11	45	57	−12	31	
7	Cuautla	34	10	7	17	42	58	−16	27	
8	Lobos Querétaro	34	7	12	15	34	53	−19	26	Relegation Playoffs
9	Universidad Veracruzana (R)	34	10	5	19	39	55	−16	25	Relegation Playoffs

Source: RSSSF
(Q) Qualified for the phase indicated; (R) Relegated

=== Group 1 ===
Pos	Team	Pld	W	D	L	GF	GA	GD	Pts	Qualification or relegation
1	Atlas (Q)	34	23	7	4	82	33	+49	53	Qualified to Playoffs
2	Salamanca (Q)	34	12	16	6	43	33	+10	40	Qualified to Playoffs
3	Tampico	34	18	4	12	50	41	+9	40	
4	Querétaro	34	13	10	11	52	38	+14	36	
5	Tepic	34	12	9	13	40	40	0	33	
6	Unión de Curtidores	34	11	9	14	45	51	−6	31	
7	Morelia	34	12	7	15	47	53	−6	31	
8	Atlético Cuernavaca	34	10	8	16	48	57	−9	28	Relegation Playoffs
9	Ciudad Victoria	34	3	10	21	26	69	−43	16	Relegation Playoffs

Source: RSSSF
(Q) Qualified for the phase indicated

== Results ==
Home \ Away	ATL	ATC	CUA	LPD	LQR	MAD	MOR	NAC	NAU	QUE	SAL	TAM	TEP	UDC	UNL	UVC	VIC	ZAM
Atlas	—	3–1	5–1	5–0	3–1	3–0	2–2	1–1	1–0	4–0	2–1	4–1	4–3	5–2	4–2	3–1	4–1	3–1
Atl. Cuernavaca	1–0	—	1–1	0–1	4–1	1–1	2–0	2–1	0–1	2–2	0–1	2–0	0–1	3–0	0–0	3–0	2–1	1–2
Cuautla	0–1	1–1	—	1–2	2–2	1–0	0–1	2–3	1–0	0–1	0–0	2–2	3–2	0–1	1–3	3–1	4–2	1–0
La Piedad	0–1	2–0	3–0	—	2–0	1–1	1–0	3–3	2–1	1–0	0–0	2–0	0–0	1–0	0–0	2–1	2–2	0–0
Lobos Querétaro	1–3	3–2	2–1	2–1	—	0–1	1–1	4–1	2–2	2–1	1–1	1–0	0–3	2–2	3–2	5–3	3–0	0–2
Ciudad Madero	0–0	4–2	2–1	0–0	2–0	—	4–2	4–1	2–2	2–1	1–1	1–0	0–3	2–2	3–2	5–3	3–0	0–2
Morelia	2–5	1–1	4–1	3–1	1–1	4–3	—	1–2	2–3	2–1	3–3	4–0	2–1	0–0	0–2	2–0	3–1	1–0
Nacional	2–2	3–4	1–1	2–0	2–0	2–2	1–2	—	1–3	1–1	1–0	1–4	1–1	0–0	1–2	1–0	1–0	0–2
Naucalpan	0–1	3–1	4–2	2–0	3–1	4–1	2–1	2–2	—	2–0	2–1	3–4	1–0	2–0	3–4	5–1	8–0	0–0
Querétaro	2–0	2–2	1–2	1–1	1–1	6–0	3–0	7–0	1–1	—	2–2	1–0	2–1	2–2	1–0	0–0	3–0	2–1
Salamanca	1–1	1–3	3–1	1–1	1–1	2–1	3–0	2–2	3–3	1–0	—	1–2	0–0	1–0	1–0	2–1	2–0	1–1
Tampico	0–0	4–2	1–2	2–1	1–0	3–0	0–1	0–0	2–1	2–1	0–1	—	3–1	1–0	3–1	3–2	3–0	0–0
Tepic	1–2	3–1	2–2	0–0	2–1	1–1	1–0	1–3	1–0	0–1	0–2	2–1	—	2–1	0–0	4–0	1–0	1–2
Unión de Curtidores	1–5	3–1	2–4	1–2	5–2	4–2	1–0	5–2	1–1	2–0	1–1	1–2	2–2	—	1–0	1–0	3–1	2–2
UANL	2–0	2–0	4–1	0–0	1–0	3–1	2–1	3–2	1–1	0–2	0–1	2–0	1–2	1–2	—	1–3	4–0	3–0
Univ. Veracruzana	2–0	2–2	1–1	1–2	1–1	0–1	3–1	2–1	2–1	0–1	1–1	0–1	3–1	1–0	0–1	—	4–2	3–0
Ciudad Victoria	0–4	2–0	0–1	0–1	0–0	1–1	2–0	1–1	2–2	2–2	1–1	0–0	1–0	0–1	1–2	0–1	—	0–0
Zamora	1–1	3–1	1–0	2–0	3–0	0–0	0–0	0–0	1–1	2–1	1–0	2–1	0–1	2–1	1–2	2–0	3–1	—

Source: RSSSF
Legend: Blue = home team win; Yellow = draw; Red = away team win.

== Promotion Playoff ==
Semi-finals
1	Atlas	3	3	6
4	Zamora	1	1	2
2	UANL	3	1	4
3	Salamanca	1	0	1

Final
1	Atlas	4
2	UANL	0

=== Final Game ===
July 16, 1972

Atlas	4–0	UANL
José Luis Herrera 16'; Berna García 29'; José Cedano 75'; José de Jesús Aceves 89'	Report

Estadio Azteca, Mexico City
