= 1957–58 Mexican Segunda División season =

Segunda División de México
- Season: 1957–58
- Champions: Celaya (1st Title)
- Matches played: 132
- Goals scored: 420 (3.18 per match)

The 1957–58 Mexican Segunda División was the eighth season of the Mexican Segunda División. The season started on 24 July 1957 and concluded on 1 December 1957. It was won by Celaya.

== Changes ==
- Zamora and Morelia were promoted to Primera División.
- Monterrey was relegated from Primera División.
- Montecarlo de Irapuato have dissolved.
- IPN and UNAM went into hiatus and did not play the season.
- Municipal de Irapuato, Salamanca and San Luis joined the league.
- Marte was disqualified the previous season and was suspended to play this football cycle.

== Teams ==
1957-58 Season Teams

Club	City	Stadium
Celaya	Celaya	Estadio Miguel Alemán Valdés
La Piedad	La Piedad	Estadio Juan N. López
Laguna	Torreón	Estadio San Isidro
Monterrey	Monterrey	Estadio Tecnológico
Municipal	Irapuato	Estadio Revolución
Nacional	Guadalajara	Parque Oro
Oviedo	Tlalnepantla	Campo Tlalnepantla
Querétaro	Querétaro	Estadio Municipal
Refinería Madero	Ciudad Madero	Estadio Tampico
Salamanca	Salamanca	Estadio El Molinito
San Luis	San Luis Potosí	Estadio 20 de Noviembre
San Sebastián	León	Estadio La Martinica

== League table ==
Pos	Team	Pld	W	D	L	GF	GA	GAv	Pts	Qualification or relegation
1	Celaya (C, P)	22	15	5	2	35	19	1.842	35	Promoted to Primera División
2	Monterrey	22	15	2	5	55	24	2.292	32	
3	San Sebastián	22	11	4	7	54	32	1.688	26	
4	Nacional	22	12	2	8	39	35	1.114	26	
5	Salamanca	22	9	5	8	42	35	1.200	23	
6	La Piedad	22	10	3	9	34	34	1.000	23	
7	Refinería Madero	22	8	6	8	35	34	1.029	22	
8	Laguna	22	8	6	8	40	39	1.026	22	
9	San Luis	22	8	6	8	29	32	0.906	22	
10	Querétaro	22	5	3	14	22	36	0.611	13	
11	Oviedo	22	2	6	14	20	50	0.400	10	
12	Municipal	22	2	6	14	15	50	0.300	10	

Source: RSSSF
(C) Champions; (P) Promoted

== Results ==
Home \ Away	CEL	LPD	LAG	MON	MUN	NAC	OVI	QUE	RMA	SAL	SNL	SSE
Celaya	—	2–2	1–0	2–0	2–0	2–0	2–1	1–0	3–1	1–0	2–1	2–0
La Piedad	0–1	—	3–2	1–2	2–0	2–0	3–0	2–0	1–0	3–3	1–0	0–1
Laguna	2–1	1–2	—	2–1	1–1	2–2	1–0	2–0	2–2	4–4	4–2	3–3
Monterrey	2–0	4–0	4–1	—	7–0	2–0	5–0	3–0	1–3	0–0	2–1	3–1
Municipal	0–0	2–3	1–1	0–4	—	2–3	2–2	3–1	0–0	0–4	0–0	0–3
Nacional	0–0	2–3	1–1	3–1	4–0	—	3–1	0–1	1–2	2–1	1–3	2–1
Oviedo	1–1	2–1	0–3	2–2	0–2	1–3	—	0–1	1–2	2–2	1–1	1–1
Querétaro	0–0	4–1	0–2	1–2	1–0	0–1	4–0	—	2–2	0–4	2–2	0–2
Refinería Madero	1–2	3–1	2–3	1–3	1–0	2–1	1–2	2–1	—	6–0	0–0	2–0
Salamanca	1–2	0–2	1–0	1–3	1–0	0–0	4–1	4–3	7–1	—	1–2	0–2
San Luis	1–2	1–1	2–1	3–1	1–0	3–1	1–0	1–0	0–0	0–2	—	3–5
San Sebastián	2–2	4–2	4–2	2–3	9–2	5–0	3–0	0–2	0–0	1–2	5–1	—

Source: RSSSF
Legend: Blue = home team win; Yellow = draw; Red = away team win.
