= Águilas de Tamaulipas =

Mexican football club

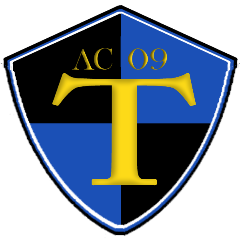
- Full name: Águilas de Tamaulipas
- Nickname: Águilas
- Founded: 2000
- Dissolved: 2001
- Ground: Estadio Tamaulipas, Tamaulipas, Tamaulipas
- Capacity: 25.000
- League: Segunda División Profesional
Home colours	Away colours

Águilas de Tamaulipas was a former Mexican football team that played in the Segunda División Profesional. It was based in the city of Tamaulipas, Tamaulipas.

== History ==
The club was founded in 2000 by professor Óscar Gutierrez, who bought the franchise from Club América that played in the Segunda División Profesional and moved it to Tamaulipas.

The club won the 2000 Segunda División Profesional championship and was promoted to Primera División A. In 2001 the club changed its name to Jaiba Brava de Tamaulipas and reached the semifinales where the club fell to Atlético Cihuatlán.

== Honors ==
- Segunda División Profesional (1): 2000
