= 1950–51 Mexican Segunda División season =

Segunda División de México
- Season: 1950–51
- Champions: Zacatepec (1st title)
- Matches: 42
- Goals: 124 (2.95 per match)

The 1950-51 Segunda División de México season was the first tournament in this competition. It counted with the participation of seven teams.

== Teams ==
1950-51 Season Teams

| Team | City | Stadium |
|---|---|---|
| Irapuato F.C. | Irapuato, Guanajuato | Revolución |
| C.D. Morelia | Morelia, Michoacán | Campo Morelia |
| C.F. Pachuca | Pachuca, Hidalgo | Campo Margarito Ramírez |
| Querétaro F.C. | Querétaro, Querétaro | Municipal de Querétaro |
| Deportivo Toluca | Toluca, State of Mexico | Campo Patria |
| Club Zacatepec | Zacatepec, Morelos | Parque del Ingenio |
| C.D. Zamora | Zamora, Michoacán | Campo Aviación |

== League standings ==
| Pos | Team | Pld | W | D | L | GF | GA | GD | Pts |
|---|---|---|---|---|---|---|---|---|---|
| 1 | Zacatepec (C) | 12 | 8 | 3 | 1 | 26 | 15 | +11 | 19 |
| 2 | Zamora | 12 | 5 | 3 | 4 | 15 | 16 | −1 | 13 |
| 3 | Pachuca | 12 | 5 | 2 | 5 | 18 | 19 | −1 | 12 |
| 4 | Irapuato | 12 | 4 | 3 | 5 | 17 | 15 | +2 | 11 |
| 5 | Morelia | 12 | 5 | 1 | 6 | 18 | 18 | 0 | 11 |
| 6 | Toluca | 12 | 3 | 3 | 6 | 17 | 19 | −2 | 9 |
| 7 | Querétaro | 12 | 4 | 1 | 7 | 13 | 22 | −9 | 9 |

Source: rsssf.com
(C) Champions

== Results ==
| Home \ Away | IRA | MOR | PAC | QRO | TOL | ZAC | ZAM |
|---|---|---|---|---|---|---|---|
| Irapuato | — | 3–1 | 1–1 | 0–2 | 1–0 | 2–3 | 4–0 |
| Morelia | 3–1 | — | 5–1 | 2–1 | 2–1 | 0–1 | 1–2 |
| Pachuca | 1–0 | 3–1 | — | 1–0 | 4–1 | 1–2 | 2–1 |
| Querétaro | 1–3 | 0–1 | 2–1 | — | 2–1 | 2–2 | 1–0 |
| Toluca | 1–1 | 2–0 | 2–1 | 5–1 | — | 0–2 | 1–1 |
| Zacatepec | 0–0 | 2–1 | 4–2 | 4–1 | 2–2 | — | 4–2 |
| Zamora | 2–1 | 1–1 | 0–0 | 2–0 | 2–1 | 2–0 | — |

Updated to match(es) played on 3 June 1951. Source: RSSSF
Legend: Blue = home team win; Yellow = draw; Red = away team win.

== Moves ==
- Zacatepec was promoted to First Division.
- San Sebastián was relegated from First Division.
- After this season Moctezuma; La Piedad and La Concepción joined the league.
