= Liga Premier de México =

Association football league in Mexico

Liga Premier
- Organising body: Mexican Football Federation
- Founded: 1950; 76 years ago as Segunda División Profesional de México
- Country: Mexico
- Confederation: CONCACAF
- President: José del Carmen Vázquez
- Number of clubs: 48 (Primera Premier, Premier A and Premier B)
- Level on pyramid: 3
- Promotion to: Liga de Expansión MX
- Relegation to: Liga TDP
- Domestic cup(s): Cup tournament Copa Conecta; Reserve tournament Torneo Talento Premier Filiales
- Current champions: Deportiva Venados (1st title)
- Most championships: Zacatepec (5 titles)
- Broadcasters: AYM Sports; Hi Sports; Televisa (Note: Includes Adrenalina Sports Network.); TVC Deportes (Note: includes TVC Deportes 2)
- Website: ligapremier.mx
- Current: 2026–27 Primera Premier season 2026–27 Liga Premier A season 2026–27 Liga Premier B season

Liga Premier is a professional association football league in Mexico and the third level of the Mexican football league system. The league is contested by 48 participating clubs, organized into three subdivisions (Primera Premier with 18 clubs, Premier A with 20 clubs and Premier B with 10 clubs). The season consists of an annual tournament, and the champions are decided by a final knockout phase in each subdivision. Since the 2026–27 season, the winners of Primera Premier are crowned champions of the Liga Premier, and the winners of Premier A and Premier B are the secondary champions of the league.

Formerly known as Segunda División Profesional de México (1950–2017). The league has been held in 101 editions, the inaugural season was played in 1950–51 with Zacatepec crowned as the first champions.

From 1950 to 1994, it was the second level league of Mexican football. Primera Premier clubs are eligible for promotion to Liga de Expansión MX, if they meet all infrastructure and economic stability requirements. Premier A and Premier B clubs, and teams affiliated with a club in a higher level league are not eligible for promotion.

Sixty-six clubs have been champions at least once. Zacatepec is the most successful club with five titles, Irapuato, Tampico Madero and Universidad del Fútbol with four titles each, Loros UdeC, Atlas, Alacranes de Durango and Pachuca Juniors with three titles each.

== History ==
=== Segunda División Profesional de México (1950–2017) ===
For administrative reasons, the Liga Mayor had decided to separate from the FMF, but after several negotiations both organizations were unified again in 1948. This caused different reforms to completely separate and differentiate the Mexican professional football and the amateur branch. One of the new reforms derived was the creation of a second-level professional league, due to this the FMF created the Segunda División Profesional de México in 1950.

It was one of the three leagues originally created for the Mexican football league system, along with the Primera División and Tercera División. The inaugural season had seven founding clubs: Deportivo Zamora, Irapuato, Morelia, Pachuca, Querétaro, Toluca and Zacatepec. From 1982 to 1994, the league was organized into two subdivisions (Segunda División 'A' and Segunda División 'B').

From 1994, the Segunda División became the third level of Mexican football, due to the creation of the Primera División 'A' as an intermediate league between the Primera and Segunda División. Tampico Madero was the last club promoted to the Primera División in the 1993–94 season. Each season was divided into groups by geographic location, with the matches predominantly among the clubs from the same group. Two short tournaments were played during two periods (1997–2018, 2021–2023), and also the 2024–25 season.

In 2008, the FMF with the approval of the owners of the clubs in the second and third levels, change the competition format dividing the league into two subdivisions (Liga Premier de Ascenso and Liga de Nuevos Talentos). The champions could earn promotion to the Primera 'A', provided their stadium and financial stability met the licensing requirements of the second level division. From 2011 to 2016, no clubs were relegated to Liga Premier, promotion still occurred during these years provided the club was licensed to participate. In June 2016, Ascenso MX announced they would resume relegating clubs. Since that year only two clubs were relegated from the Ascenso MX: Loros UdeC in 2017 and Murciélagos in 2018.

=== Liga Premier (2017–present) ===
In June 2017, the league announced its rebranding as Liga Premier, and the two subdivisions were also rebranded (Serie A and Serie B). In Serie A, clubs with the best infrastructure could continue to participate, while Serie B would be for clubs in sporting and economic development.

In 2020, the Ascenso MX was replaced by Liga de Expansión MX, two clubs from the Segunda División were invited (Tepatitlán and Tlaxcala), both clubs won their promotion but were rejected in the second level for not meeting the requirements to participate. Since that year, the requirements to be admitted to the second level have been tightened, only three clubs were promoted in the following years, Alacranes de Durango in 2022, Jaiba Brava in 2024, and Irapuato in 2025.

In 2026, the league changed the competition format and was organized into three subdivisions (Primera Premier, Premier A and Premier B). The Primera Premier as the new main subdivision of the league included the 18 Serie A clubs best positioned to be promoted to the Liga de Expansión MX. Meanwhile, Serie A became an intermediate league, and Serie B remained as the lowest subdivision for developing clubs.

Promotion and relegation would be formalized between the leagues. Primera Premier would promote one club to Liga de Expansión MX. Additionally, one Serie A club could promote to Primera Premier and one club would be promoted from Premier B to Premier A each year. Four clubs would be promoted from Liga TDP provided they meet the Serie requirements of Article 57.

== Competition format ==
=== Regular phase ===
One tournament is played per season, throughout the FIFA's world footballing calendar, the 48 clubs are divided into three subdivisions (Primera Premier, Premier A and Premier B). Primera Premier includes clubs with the best economic and sporting infraestructure to compete for promotion to Liga de Expansión MX. It has 18 participating clubs.

Premier A includes clubs of medium level and infrastructure that can aspire to promotion in the medium term. It has 20 participating clubs.

Premier B includes developing clubs with less infrastructure, but committed to improving in order to aspire to participate in Premier A. It has 10 participating clubs in a single group.

The teams known as "filiales" also participate, which are the reserve teams affiliated with clubs at higher levels (Liga MX and Liga de Expansión MX). These clubs are not eligible for promotion, however, they qualify for its own final knockout phase for the affiliated teams title, known as Torneo Talento Premier Filiales.

=== Final phase ===
The final phase of Primera Premier and Premier A consists of eight clubs, the top four clubs from each group for the final knockout phase. The Primera Premier champions are crowned officially as the Liga Premier champions, and also will be eligible to participate in a certification audit for obtain the promotion to Liga de Expansión MX, provided that the club meets the requirements for the stadium and financial stability.

The final phase of Premier B consists of four clubs, the four highest-placed from the group of ten qualify for the final knockout phase. The Premier B champions cannot be promoted to Liga de Expansión MX, but they can participate in Premier A depending on improvements to their infrastructure.

Starting with the 2026–27 season, a single play–off stage, will be held for reserves teams, regardless of whether they compete in Premier A or Premier B, featuring the top two reserves teams from both branches; they will play semifinals and a final to determine the champion among this type of clubs. This trophy is named Torneo Talento Premier Filiales.

== Participating clubs ==
=== 2026–27 season ===
The 2026–27 Primera Premier season has the following 18 participating clubs.

Primera Premier clubs
Group I	Group II
Cordobés; Irapuato; La Piedad; Lobos ULMX; Los Cabos United; Purépechas; Tigres de Álica; Tritones Vallarta; Zacatepec	Atlético Celaya; Chapulineros de Oaxaca; Deportiva Venados; Inter Playa del Carmen; Jaguares; Montañeses; Pioneros de Cancún; Racing de Veracruz; Tapachula Soconusco

The 2026–27 Liga Premier A season has the following 20 participating clubs.

Premier A clubs
Group I	Group II
Correcaminos Premier (Note: Affiliate team of Correcaminos UAT.); Guerreros de Autlán; Héroes de Zaci; La Tribu de Ciudad Juárez; Mineros de Fresnillo (Note: Affiliate team of Mineros de Zacatecas.); Real Apodaca; Saltillo Soccer; Santiago; Vaqueros Reynosa; Zapotlanejo	Acámbaro; Artesanos Metepec; Cañoneros; Calor; Club de Ciervos; Delfines de Coatzacoalcos; Dragones de Oaxaca; Guerreros del Pacífico; Halcones Negros; Real Refineros CDS

The 2026–27 Liga Premier B season has the following 10 participating clubs.

Premier B clubs
- Atlético Celaya B (Note: Affiliate team of Atlético Celaya.)
- Atlético Hidalgo
- Ayense
- Cruz Azul Lagunas
- Gorilas
- Héroes de Zaci B (Note: Affiliate team of Héroes de Zaci.)
- Huracanes Izcalli
- Internacional Laguna
- Irapuato B (Note: Affiliate team of Irapuato.)
- Racing de Veracruz B (Note: Affiliate team of Racing de Veracruz.)

On hiatus
- Aguacateros CDU (Note: Affiliate team of Atlético Morelia.)
- Caja Oblatos
- Cimarrones de Sonora
- Colima
- Deportivo Zitácuaro
- Dragones Toluca
- Ensenada
- Gavilanes de Matamoros
- Halcones
- Neza
- Poza Rica
- Sporting Canamy
- Tecos
- Tuzos UAZ

== Performances ==
Rank	Club	Titles	Runners-up	Seasons
1	Zacatepec	5	3	1950–51, 1962–63, 1969–70, 1977–78, 1983–84
2	Irapuato	4	8	1953–54, 1984–85, 2020–21, Cla–2025
2	Tampico Madero^{2}	4	3	1993–94, Cla–2016, Cla–2023, 2023–24
2	Universidad del Fútbol^{5}	4	0	Cla–2008, Cla–2009, Ape–2009, Bic–2010
5	Loros UdeC^{3}	3	2	Cla–2015, Cla–2018, 2018–19
5	Alacranes de Durango^{2}	3	2	Inv–1998, Ver–1999, Ape–2021
5	Atlas^{1}	3	0	1954–55, 1971–72, 1978–79
5	Pachuca Juniors^{5}	3	0	Cla–2004, Ape–2006, Ape–2007
9	Ciudad Madero/ Refinería Madero^{5}	2	3	1964–65, 1972–73
9	Pachuca^{1}	2	3	1966–67, 1991–92
9	Monterrey^{1}	2	2	1955–56, 1959–60
9	Unión de Curtidores^{5}	2	2	Mex–1970, 1982–83
9	Monarcas Zitácuaro/ Potros Zitácuaro^{4}	2	2	Inv–1997, Ver–2001
9	Académicos/ Atlas B^{5}	2	1	Ape–2004, Cla–2005
9	Tlaxcala^{2}	2	1	Ape–2016, Cla–2017
9	Celaya^{5}	2	0	1957–58, Ind–2010
9	San Luis^{5}	2	0	1970–71, 1975–76
9	Atlante^{1}	2	0	1976–77, 1990–91
9	Cobras de Juárez/ Cobras de Querétaro^{5}	2	0	1985–86, 1987–88
9	Titanes de Tulancingo^{5}	2	0	Ape–2011, Cla–2012
9	Potros UAEM^{5}	2	0	Ape–2014, Ape–2015
22	Deportivo Zamora^{5}	1	3	1956–57
22	Deportivo Cihuatlán^{3}	1	3	Inv–2001
22	La Piedad	1	2	1951–52
22	Cruz Azul Hidalgo^{2}	1	2	1994–95
22	Deportivo Tepic^{5}	1	2	Ape–2002
22	Tampico^{5}	1	1	1958–59
22	Nuevo León^{5}	1	1	1965–66
22	Laguna^{5}	1	1	1967–68
22	Tigres UANL^{1}	1	1	1973–74
22	Morelia/ Atlético Morelia^{2}	1	1	1980–81
22	León^{1}	1	1	1989–90
22	Atlético Bachilleres^{5}	1	1	1996–97
22	Gallos de Aguascalientes^{5}	1	1	Ver–1998
22	Truenos de Cuautitlán^{5}	1	1	Inv–1999
22	Marte Morelos^{5}	1	1	Ver–2000
22	Chivas Rayadas^{5}	1	1	Rev–2011
22	Murciélagos^{5}	1	1	Ape–2012
22	Tuzos UAZ^{4}	1	1	Ape–2022
22	Aguacateros de Peribán	1	1	Ape–2024
22	Toluca^{1}	1	0	1952–53
22	Nacional^{3}	1	0	1960–61
22	Pumas UNAM^{1}	1	0	1961–62
22	Cruz Azul^{1}	1	0	1963–64
22	Torreón^{5}	1	0	1968–69
22	Tecos UAG^{4}	1	0	1974–75
22	Atletas Campesinos^{5}	1	0	1979–80
22	Oaxtepec-IMSS^{5}	1	0	1981–82
22	Correcaminos UAT^{2}	1	0	1986–87
22	Potros Neza^{5}	1	0	1988–89
22	Toros UTN^{4}	1	0	1992–93
22	Tigrillos UANL^{5}	1	0	1995–96
22	Águilas de Tamaulipas^{5}	1	0	Inv–2000
22	Astros Ciudad Juárez^{5}	1	0	Ver–2002
22	Delfines de Coatzacoalcos	1	0	Cla–2003
22	Lobos BUAP^{5}	1	0	Ape–2003
22	Delfines B^{5}	1	0	Ape–2005
22	Pegaso Anáhuac^{5}	1	0	Cla–2006
22	Cruz Azul Jasso^{5}	1	0	Cla–2007
22	Mérida B^{5}	1	0	Ape–2008
22	Ballenas Galeana Morelos^{5}	1	0	Cla–2013
22	Linces de Tlaxcala^{5}	1	0	Ape–2013
22	Atlético Coatzacoalcos^{5}	1	0	Cla–2014
22	Tepatitlán^{2}	1	0	Ape–2017
22	Mazorqueros^{5}	1	0	Cla–2022
22	Deportiva Venados	1	0	2025–26
67	Tapatío^{2}	0	5	—
67	Poza Rica^{4}	0	3	—
67	Tecamachalco^{5}	0	3	—
67	San Sebastián de León^{5}	0	2	—
67	Cuautla^{5}	0	2	—
67	Inter Playa del Carmen	0	2	—
67	Puebla^{1}	0	1	—
67	Veracruz^{5}	0	1	—
67	Leones Negros UdeG^{2}	0	1	—
67	Tecnológico de Celaya^{5}	0	1	—
67	Querétaro^{1}	0	1	—
67	Osos Grises^{4}	0	1	—
67	Jalisco^{5}	0	1	—
67	Gallos Blancos UAQ^{5}	0	1	—
67	Atlético Yucatán^{2}	0	1	—
67	Inter de Tijuana^{5}	0	1	—
67	Delfines de Xalapa^{5}	0	1	—
67	Real de La Plata^{5}	0	1	—
67	América Coapa^{5}	0	1	—
67	Deportivo Autlán	0	1	—
67	Cachorros UdeG^{5}	0	1	—
67	Pumas Naucalpan^{5}	0	1	—
67	Pénjamo-Irapuato^{5}	0	1	—
67	Necaxa Rayos^{5}	0	1	—
67	Tiburones Rojos de Córdoba^{5}	0	1	—
67	Dorados de Los Mochis^{5}	0	1	—
67	Altamira^{5}	0	1	—
67	Nuevo Laredo^{5}	0	1	—
67	Cimarrones de Sonora^{4}	0	1	—
67	Cafetaleros de Chiapas^{5}	0	1	—
67	Los Cabos United	0	1	—

Notes

1. Currently in Liga MX.
2. Currently in Liga de Expansión MX.
3. Currently in Liga TDP.
4. Currently on hiatus.
5. Defunct.

== Cup tournament ==
Copa de la Liga Premier de Ascenso was a domestic cup tournament for clubs in the Liga Premier de Ascenso, the main subdivision of the Segunda División, it was held between 1950 and 2015.

Formerly known as Copa de la Segunda División (1950–1972, 1995–96). The tournament was held in 27 editions, the inaugural season was played in 1950–51 with Irapuato crowned as the first champions. Twenty clubs were champions at least once. Poza Rica was the most successful club with five titles, Irapuato with three titles and Pachuca with two titles.

=== Performances ===
Rank	Club	Titles	Runners-up	Seasons
1	Poza Rica	5	1	1958–59, 1960–61, 1962–63, 1964–65, 1967–68
2	Irapuato	3	2	1950–51, 1952–53, 1953–54
3	Pachuca	2	0	1963–64, 1965–66
4	Laguna	1	3	1954–55
4	Morelia	1	1	1955–56
4	Zacatepec	1	1	1966–67
4	Unión de Curtidores	1	1	1970–71
4	Cruz Azul Jasso	1	1	Ape–2013
4	La Concepción	1	0	1951–52
4	San Sebastián de León	1	0	1956–57
4	Nacional	1	0	1957–58
4	Texcoco	1	0	1959–60
4	Refinería Madero	1	0	1961–62
4	Torreón	1	0	1968–69
4	Deportivo Zamora	1	0	1969–70
4	Naucalpan	1	0	1971–72
4	Chivas Rayadas	1	0	1995–96
4	Indios UACJ	1	0	Cla–2014
4	Murciélagos	1	0	Ape–2015
4	Tecos UAG	1	0	Cla–2015
21	Atlas	0	2	—
21	Tampico	0	2	—
21	Deportivo Tepic	0	2	—
21	Toluca	0	1	—
21	Moctezuma	0	1	—
21	Politécnico	0	1	—
21	Monterrey	0	1	—
21	Pumas UNAM	0	1	—
21	Orizaba	0	1	—
21	Puebla	0	1	—
21	Celaya	0	1	—
21	Salamanca	0	1	—
21	Ocelotes UNACH	0	1	—
21	Gallos Blancos	0	1	—

== Campeón de Campeones ==
Campeón de Campeones de la Liga Premier was a domestic super cup contested by the Liga Premier champions of the Apertura and Clausura tournaments, it was held between 1953 and 2025. Until 1996, the trophy was contested by the league and cup champions of the Segunda División.

Formerly known as Campeón de Campeones de la Segunda División (1953–1972, 1995–2017). The trophy was contested in 44 editions, the inaugural match was played in 1953 with Toluca crowned as the first champions. Thirty-seven clubs were champions at least once. Pachuca Juniors was the most successful club with three titles, Poza Rica, Zacatepec, Deportivo Zamora, Ciudad Madero and Alacranes de Durango with two titles each.

=== Performances ===
Rank	Club	Titles	Runners-up	Seasons
1	Pachuca Juniors	3	0	2004, 2007, 2008
2	Poza Rica	2	3	1961, 1968
2	Zacatepec	2	1	1963, 1967
2	Deportivo Zamora	2	0	1957, 1960
2	Ciudad Madero/ Refinería Madero	2	0	1962, 1965
2	Alacranes de Durango	2	0	1999^{1}, 2022
7	Irapuato	1	2	1954^{2}
7	Universidad del Fútbol	1	2	2010^{1}
7	Laguna	1	1	1955
7	Nacional	1	1	1958
7	Monterrey	1	1	1960
7	Atlas	1	1	1972
7	Celaya	1	1	2011
7	Loros UdeC	1	1	2015
7	Potros UAEM	1	1	2016
7	Tampico Madero	1	1	2021
7	Toluca	1	0	1953
7	Morelia	1	0	1956
7	Tampico	1	0	1959
7	Nuevo León	1	0	1966
7	Torreón	1	0	1969^{2}
7	Unión de Curtidores	1	0	1971
7	Tigrillos UANL	1	0	1996
7	Gallos de Aguascalientes	1	0	1998
7	Marte Morelos	1	0	2000
7	Águilas de Tamaulipas	1	0	2001
7	Deportivo Cihuatlán	1	0	2002
7	Delfines de Coatzacoalcos	1	0	2003
7	Académicos	1	0	2005
7	Pegaso Anáhuac	1	0	2006
7	Mérida B	1	0	2009
7	Titanes de Tulancingo	1	0	2012^{1}
7	Ballenas Galeana Morelos	1	0	2013
7	Atlético Coatzacoalcos	1	0	2014
7	Tlaxcala	1	0	2017^{1}
7	Tepatitlán	1	0	2018
7	Aguacateros de Peribán	1	0	2025
38	Pachuca	0	2	—
38	Chivas Rayadas	0	2	—
38	Monarcas Zitácuaro/ Potros Zitácuaro	0	2	—
38	San Sebastián de León	0	1	—
38	Texcoco	0	1	—
38	San Luis	0	1	—
38	Naucalpan	0	1	—
38	Truenos de Cuautitlán	0	1	—
38	Astros Ciudad Juárez	0	1	—
38	Deportivo Tepic	0	1	—
38	Lobos BUAP	0	1	—
38	Delfines B	0	1	—
38	Cruz Azul Jasso	0	1	—
38	Murciélagos	0	1	—
38	Linces de Tlaxcala	0	1	—
38	Mazorqueros	0	1	—
38	Tuzos UAZ	0	1	—

Notes

1. Automatic winners of the trophy and promotion for winning both league tournaments of the season.
2. Automatic winners of the trophy for winning the season's league and cup tournament.

== See also ==
- Sport in Mexico
- Football in Mexico
- Mexican football league system
- Mexican Football Federation
- Liga MX
- Liga de Expansión MX
- Ascenso MX
- Liga TDP
- Copa Conecta
- Copa Promesas MX
