= Estadio Universitario Alberto "Chivo" Córdoba =

Multi-use stadium in Toluca, Mexico

Coordinates: 19°17′6.56″N 99°40′34.07″W

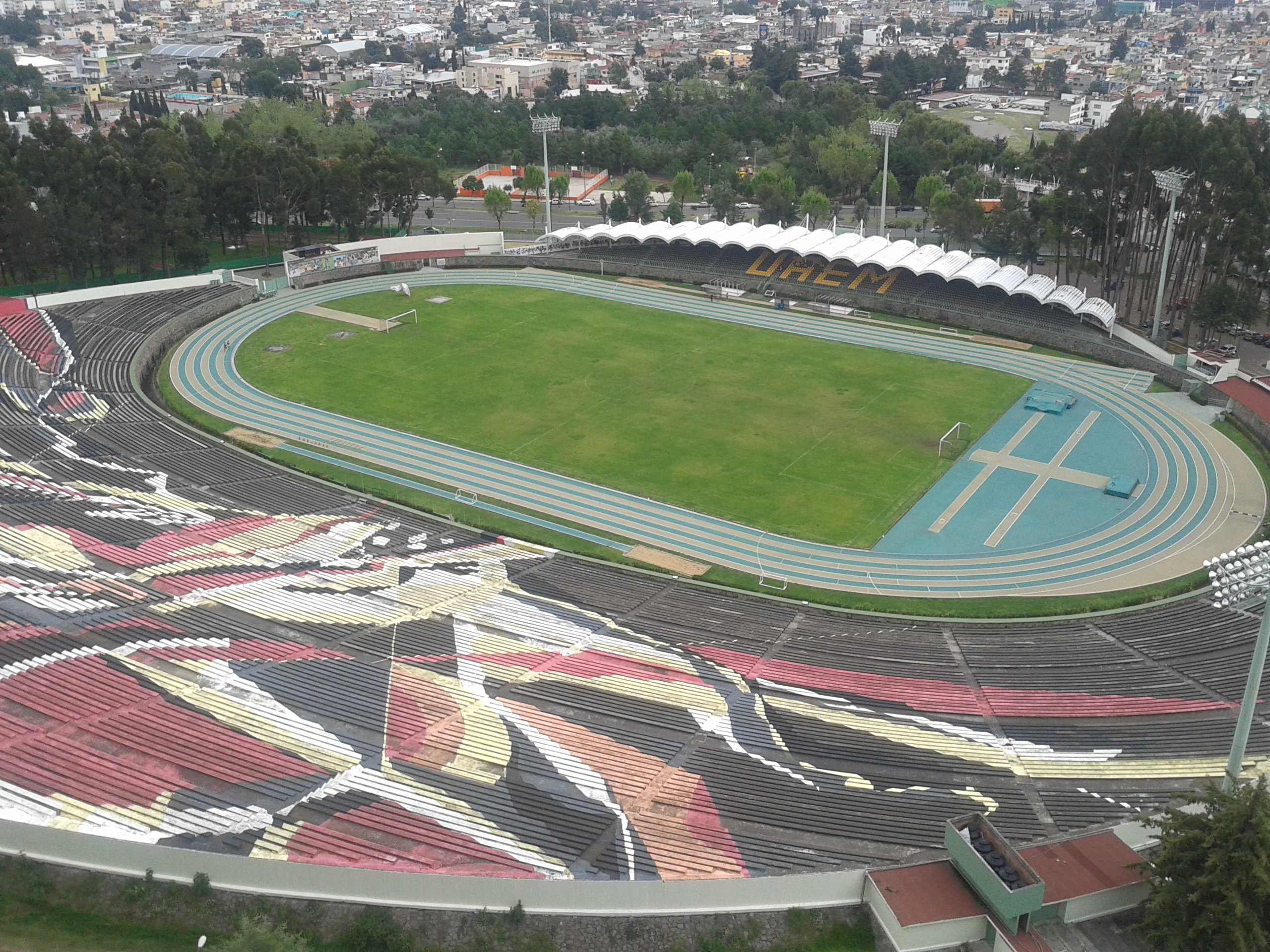
- Estadio Universitario as seen from Cerro del Coatepec
- Interactive map of Estadio Universitario Alberto "Chivo" Córdoba
- Location: Toluca, Mexico State
- Owner: Autonomous University of Mexico State (UAEM)
- Capacity: 35,000
- Surface: Grass

Construction
- Opened: 5 November 1964

Tenants
- Potros UAEM (1970–2020); Potros Salvajes UAEM (1981–present); Toluca FC (2016); Atlante (women) (2026–present)

Estadio Universitario Alberto "Chivo" Córdoba is a multi-use stadium in Toluca, Mexico, on the campus of the Autonomous University of Mexico State (UAEM). The stadium seats 32,000 and is used mostly for football matches.

== History ==
Construction of the stadium began between 1957 and 1958 as a municipal facility for the city of Toluca, with a formal opening on 5 November 1964. It is named for Alberto "Chivo" Córdoba, who coached the UAEM American football team. In the early 1970s, the UAEM made its first entrance into professional soccer with the first Potros team, which played for a number of years and managed a promotion but was shuttered due to poor economic support.

Between 1974 and 1976, the mural Aratmósfera was painted on the west side stands by Leopoldo Flores. It depicts a man reaching toward the sky to touch light. The mural resulted in Spanish news site 20minutos naming the stadium as one of the 10 most original in the world. The mural was also featured in a commemorative stamp issued as part of a series celebrating the 50th anniversary of the construction of the campus.

In 2005, the eastern stands were covered and converted to seats. In 2016, upon Potros's promotion to Ascenso MX, the stadium was renovated to meet requirements for the new division, including the addition of a press room and a higher-power lighting system.

In 2017, the Mexican Football Federation informed Potros that, as Estadio Universitario is not an all-seater (there are no seats on the mural), it would not be able to be promoted to Liga MX and continue to play matches there, even though Liga MX matches have been played at the venue in the recent past and other venues in the league are not all-seaters.

== Tenants ==
=== University teams ===
From its opening, teams associated with the UAEM have used the facility for American football and soccer matches. Aside from the soccer team, ONEFA Liga Mayor American football debuted at the UAEM for the 1982 season.

=== Deportivo Toluca FC ===
During the reconstruction of the Estadio Nemesio Díez, Toluca's top-flight soccer club, Deportivo Toluca F.C., played its home matches at Estadio Universitario for over a year. This period was longer than the club expected; while plans were to return to Nemesio Díez in September 2016, these were scrapped. Fans complained of long lines and traffic tie-ups during this period.

=== Atlante women's team ===
In April 2026, Atlante F.C. announced that its women's team would play in this stadium starting with the 2026–27 Liga MX Femenil season, becoming the third stadium in that league to be used exclusively by a women's team.

== See also ==
- List of football stadiums in Mexico
