= Juan Galindo (municipality) =

Coordinates: 20.2111°N 98.0000°W

- Municipality
- Location of the municipality in Puebla
- Country: Mexico
- State: Puebla
- Time zone: UTC-6 (Zona Centro)

Juan Galindo is a municipality in the Mexican state of Puebla.
