= Autonomous University of Nayarit =

Mexican university

- Universidad Autónoma de Nayarit
- Former name: Universidad de Nayarit (University of Nayarit)
- Motto: Spanish: Por lo nuestro a lo universal
- Type: Public university
- Established: 1969
- President: Lic. Aaron Verdusco Veltran
- Rector: M.C. Jorge Ignacio Peña González
- Students: 29,000
- Undergraduates: 9768 (As of 2006)
- Postgraduates: 465 (As of 2006)
- Location: Tepic, Nayarit, Mexico; 21°29′31″N 104°53′31″W
- Campus: Several across the state; mostly rural.
- Newspaper: Gaceta UAN, Peridici con Visión Ciudadan
- Mascot: Reptiles
- Website: https://www.uan.mx

The Autonomous University of Nayarit (in Spanish: Universidad Autónoma de Nayarit, UAN) is a Mexican public university based in the city of Tepic, Nayarit, that offers secondary education in addition to undergraduate and graduate education. The university offers 15 preparatory schools located across the major regions of the state. The university offers 33 undergraduate degrees and 28 postgraduate degrees. Enrollment at the university level has been rising since 1996.

Its library system holds more than 91,280 volumes in 29 libraries.

== History ==
The university was founded in 1969 by Dr. Julian Gascon Mercado, then governor of the state of Nayarit, through the City Patronage of Culture “Amado Nervo” and decree No. 5162. The founding of the university was made possible through a series of decrees dating back to 1925 by governors Felipe C. Rios and Ricardo Velarde which established a School of Jurisprudence and a Senior High School. By 1955, the School of Jurisprudence was combined with the Institute of the State, founded in 1930, to form the first antecedent to the University of Nayarit. The school continued to expand through the addition of the Normal School in 1958 and the School of Nursing in 1959. A major step toward foundation was made when Francisco Garcia Montero, then governor of Nayarit, issued decree No. 4466 containing the “fundamental laws” of the Institute of Letters and Sciences legally conferring the school a decentralized public body whose duties include teaching at a preparatory and professional level and promoting social and scientific research. After becoming classified as a decentralized public body, Julian Gascon Mercado, created the City Patronage of Culture “Amado Nervo” and passed decree No. 5162 that formally transformed the loosely associated schools into the University of Nayarit. The university sought to achieve autonomous status after a series of reforms to the universities “fundamental laws” by Roberto Gomez Reyes in 1975, granting the university self governance. These reforms were met with resistance, and the university did not achieve autonomous status until 1985.

== Student life ==
=== Federation of Students ===
The Federation of Student of Autonomous University of Nayarit (FEUAN) is official entity encompassing student government. The federation was founded in 1981 for the purpose of acknowledging and responding to the needs of the student population. The Federation provides access to several academic programs including scholarships, student exchange programs, university forums and community English classes. The federation also provides access to several cultural, recreational, social, and athletic clubs.

== Departments ==
The university is composed of 14 departments that stretch across multiple campuses.

- Center Specializing in Virtual Education
- University Center of Social Sciences and Humanities
- Academic Unit of Basic Sciences and Engineering
- Academic Unit of Agriculture
- Academic Unit of Accounting and Administration
- Academic Unit of Chemistry, Biology and Pharmaceuticals
- Academic Unit of Law
- Academic Unit of Economics
- Academic Unit of Nursing
- Academic Unit of Medicine
- Academic Unit of Veterinary Medicine and Husbandry
- Academic Unit of Dentistry
- Academic Unit of Tourism
- Academic Unit of Fisheries
