= Potros UAEM =

Mexican football club

- Full name: Club de Fútbol Potros de la Universidad Autónoma del Estado de México
- Nickname: Los Potros (The Colts)
- Founded: 1970; 56 years ago
- Dissolved: June 2020; 6 years ago
- Ground: Estadio Universitario Alberto "Chivo" Córdoba; Toluca, Mexico, México
- Capacity: 32,603
- Website: potrosuaemfc.mx
Home colours	Away colours	Third colours

Club de Fútbol Potros de la Universidad Autónoma del Estado de México, shorten as Potros UAEM, was a Mexican football team. They were nicknamed Potros (Broncos). Their uniform color was white and green, wearing a white and green vertical stripe shirt for their home games. The club was founded in 1970 when the Autonomous University of the State of Mexico register its football squad in to the Tercera División de México under the name of Moscos de la UAEM. The club played in the Ascenso MX between 2016 and 2019. In December 2019, the team dissolved their Ascenso MX squad and only maintained the Liga TDP team until the end of the season, after this, the second squad was dissolved.

== History ==
Potros de la Universidad Autónoma del Estado de México' was a Mexican football team. They are nicknamed Los Potros (Colts). The club has played on and off in the Tercera División de México since 1970 when they were known as Moscos de la UAEM. In 1975 under the management of Javier Zea the club is promoted to the Segunda División Profesional. The club would disappear a couple of years later due to lack of fan support having Toluca FC in the same city.

The club made its return in 1990, Rector M. en C. Efrén Rojas Dávila were important people in having the club playing once again professional university level football joying the IX Juegos Deportivos Selectivos Universitarios. That first squad was made up of students attending the university. In 1999 the club earned promotion from the Tercera División de México to the Segunda División Profesional where they have been playing ever since.

On May 15, 2016, the Colts would again have the opportunity to achieve promotion to the Ascenso MX on their second attempt against Tampico Madero, after the first leg in Alberto " Chivo " Cordova, the Colts went 1–0 at home as favorable for Tamaulipas in the second leg but they conclude by achieve 0–0 tie and move up in the Ascenso MX however both teams were promoted for the 2016–17 season by Tampico Madero will play as an expansion team and Estado de Mexico will play as a promotion team.

On 7 December 2019, the team announced they would no longer be able to compete in Ascenso MX citing their financial inability to operate in the division. This was initially considered the end of the club, however, the board kept the reserve team competing in the Liga TDP, this squad became the main team of the franchise, they competed until the end of the season.

== Stadium ==
Potros UAEM play their home matches at the Estadio Universitario Alberto "Chivo" Córdoba in Toluca, State of Mexico. The stadium capacity is 32,603 people. Its owned by UAEM, and its surface is covered by natural grass. The stadium was opened in 1964.

== Jerseys ==
First kit evolution

2017–18 Home	2017–18 Away	2017–18 Third	2016–17 Home	2016–17 Away	2016–17 Third

== Players ==
=== Current squad ===
As of 9 January 2020

Note: Flags indicate national team as defined under FIFA eligibility rules; some limited exceptions apply. Players may hold more than one non-FIFA nationality.

No.	Pos.	Nation	Player

== Managers ==
- (Mexico) Omar Ramírez (2013–2017)
- (Uruguay) Héctor Hugo Eugui (2017–2018)
- (Mexico) David Rangel (2018–2019)

== Honours ==
- Segunda División de México Liga Premier de Ascenso: 2

Apertura 2014
Apertura 2015

- Tercera División de México: 1

1975

- Campeonas Estatales: 1

2007

== See also ==
- Toluca
- Tercera División de México
- Segunda División Profesional
