= Estadio Marte R. Gómez =

Stadium in Ciudad Victoria, Mexico

Coordinates: 23°44′22.02″N 99°9′8.88″W

Estadio Marte Rodolfo Gómez Segura
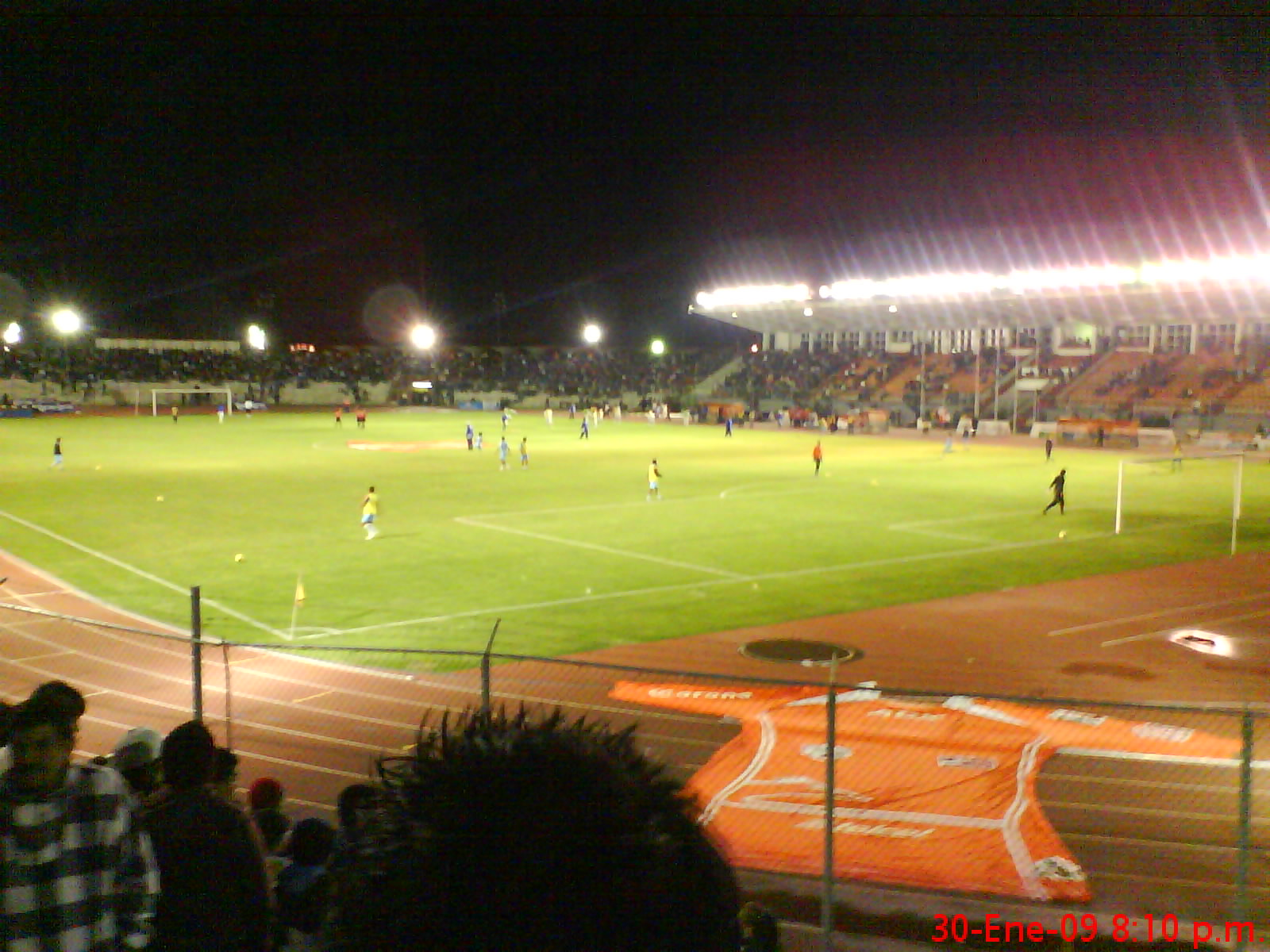
- Interactive map of Estadio Marte Rodolfo Gómez Segura
- Location: Ciudad Victoria, Tamaulipas
- Owner: State of Tamaulipas
- Capacity: 10,520
- Surface: Grass

Construction
- Opened: October 19, 1939

The Estadio Marte Rodolfo Gómez Segura is a multi-use stadium in Ciudad Victoria, Tamaulipas, Mexico. It is currently used mostly for football matches and is the home stadium for Correcaminos UAT. The stadium has a capacity of 10,520 people and opened in 1938.
