= Estadio Isidro Gil Tapia =

Multi-use stadium in Cuautla, Morelos, Mexico

Coordinates: 18°48′25″N 98°56′56″W

- Interactive map of Estadio Isidro Gil Tapia
- Address: Cuautla, Morelos; Mexico
- Capacity: 5,000
- Type: Sports

The Estadio Isidro Gil Tapia is a multi-use stadium in Cuautla, Morelos, Mexico. It is currently used mostly for football matches and is the home stadium for C.D. Cuautla. The stadium has a capacity of 5,000 people.

Isidro Gil Tapia (d. October 31, 2016) was a goalkeeper for Cuautla, Atlético Zacatepec, and Club América in the 1950s and 1960s. He played in the Mexico national football team in 1978 prior to the World Cup. He invented the metal mesh goal and a soccer laboratory and was a coach for Cuautla, Zacatepec, the Gray Bears of the State of Mexico, and Cruz Azul in the 1970s and 1980s.
