= C.D. Cuautla =

Mexican football club

Cuautla
- Full name: Club Deportivo Cuautla
- Nickname: Los Arroceros (The Rice cookers)
- Founded: July 19, 1952; 74 years ago
- Dissolved: June 2022; 4 years ago
- Ground: Estadio Isidro Gil Tapia; Cuautla, Morelos
- Capacity: 5,000
- Owner: Denzer Corona Vergara
- Chairman: Denzer Corona Vergara
- Manager: Vacant
- League: Liga Premier - Serie B
- Apertura 2021: 3rd
Home colours	Away colours

Club Deportivo Cuautla was a Mexican football club based in Cuautla, Morelos that competed in the Liga Premier - Serie B, the third division level of Mexican football. They played their home team match games at the Estadio Isidro Gil Tapia.

== History ==
The club's history dates back to 1952 when the club was founded in Cuautla, Morelos and joined the Segunda División de México. In the 1953-54 season, the club finished runner-up. Due to the increased number of clubs in the Primera División de México, the Federación Mexicana de Fútbol (FMF) organized a promotional playoff series with: Cuautla; two teams from the Segunda División (Zamora and Querétaro); and the last place two teams in the Primera División de México (Atlante and Marte). The outcome: Atlante remained the Primera División; Cuautla was promoted to the Primera División; Querétaro remained in the Segunda División; and Marte was demoted to the Segunda División.

The club played 4 years in the Primera División until its relegation in the 1958-59 season.

The club has come close to returning to the Primera División on two occasions (first, 1971–72; second, 1978–79) when they lost to Atlas in promotional matches.

== In modern times ==
The badge used in the Segunda División.

The club played intermittently in the Segunda División de México since its last appearance in the Primera División in 1959, until it was dissolved in 2022.

== Players ==
=== Current squad ===
As of January 13, 2022

Note: Flags indicate national team as defined under FIFA eligibility rules; some limited exceptions apply. Players may hold more than one non-FIFA nationality.

No. / Pos. / Nation / Player	No. / Pos. / Nation / Player

== Season to season ==
Season	Division	Notes
1952-53	Segunda División de México	
1953-54	Segunda División de México	
1954-55	Segunda División de México	
1955-56	Primera División de México	
1956-57	Primera División de México	
1957-58	Primera División de México	
1958-59	Primera División de México	
1959-60	Segunda División de México	
1960-61	Segunda División de México	
1961-62	Segunda División de México	
1962-63	Segunda División de México	
1963-1970	Statistics unavailable	
1970-71	Segunda División de México	
1971-72	Segunda División de México	
1972-73	Segunda División de México	
1973-74	Segunda División de México	
1974-75	Segunda División de México	
1975-76	Segunda División de México	
1976-77	Segunda División de México	
1977-78	Segunda División de México	
1978-79	Segunda División de México	
1979-80	Segunda División de México	
1980-81	Segunda División de México	

Season	Division	Place
1981-82	Segunda División de México	
1982-83	Segunda División de México	
1983-84	Segunda División de México	
1984-85	Segunda División de México	
1985-86	Segunda División de México	
1985-86	Segunda División de México	
1986-87	Segunda División de México	
Apertura 2011	Segunda División de México	
Clausura 2012	Segunda División de México	
Apertura 2012	Segunda División de México	
Clausura 2013	Segunda División de México	
Apertura 2013	Segunda División de México	Semifinals
Clausura 2014	Segunda División de México	Quarterfinals
Apertura 2014	Segunda División de México	DNQ Liguilla
Clausura 2015	Segunda División de México	Quarterfinals
Apertura 2015	Segunda División de México	Semifinals
Clausura 2016	Segunda División de México	15th (7th in Group)
Apertura 2016	Segunda División de México	DNQ Ligulla
Clausura 2017	Segunda División de México	
Apertura 2017	Segunda División de México	
Clausura 2018	Segunda División de México	DNQ Liguilla
2018–19	Segunda División de México	DNQ Liguilla
2019–20	Segunda División de México	6th/Season Curtailed due to the COVID-19 pandemic
2020–21	Segunda División de México	10th GII DNQ Liguilla

== Honors ==
- Segunda División de México
  - Runners-up (1): 1954
  - Promotional Play-off (1): 1955
