= Estadio Tamaulipas =

Football stadium in Ciudad Madero, Mexico

Coordinates: 22°16′47.92″N 97°51′2.44″W

- Coloso de la Unidad Nacional "Colossus of National Unity"
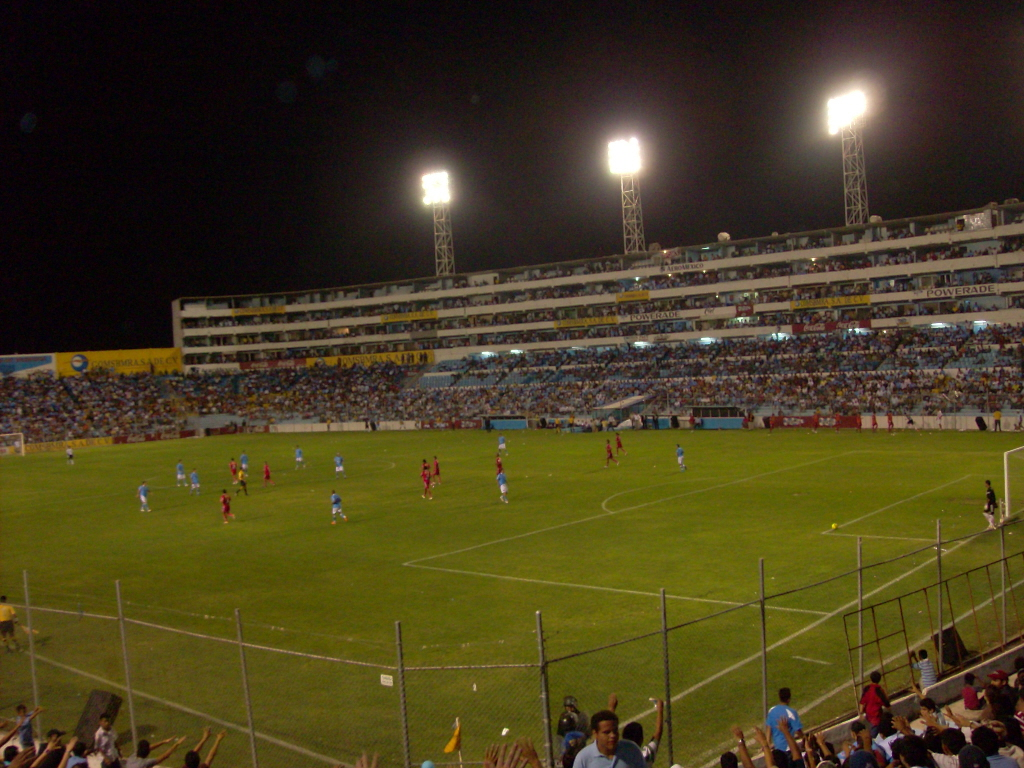
- Estadio Tamaulipas in 2008
- Interactive map of Estadio Tamaulipas
- Location: Tampico-Ciudad Madero, Tamaulipas, Mexico
- Capacity: 19,667
- Surface: Grass
- Field size: 105 by 68 metres (115 yd × 74 yd)

Construction
- Opened: 30 April 1966
- Architect: Manuel Ortega Barroueta

Tenants
- Club Jaiba Brava (1982–); Club Deportivo Tampico (1966-1982)

The Estadio Tamaulipas is a football stadium in the southern portion of the Mexican state of Tamaulipas, serving as the home of Club Jaiba Brava It sits across two municipalities, Tampico and Ciudad Madero, and has a capacity of 19,667. The center line of the stadium sits on the municipal boundary.

== History ==
Construction of the Estadio Tamaulipas began on 3 January 1965, with a groundbreaking ceremony led by Governor Praxedis Balboa. The stadium was designed by Manuel Ortega Barroueta, who was responsible for a number of other stadiums around the country in the late 1960s, including the Estadio León and the original Estadio Corona in Torreón. The first match in the stadium was held on 3 April 1966, between AS Monaco FC and a combined team of players from Tampico and Madero, which at the time had separate squads; Monaco won 2-1, with Francis Blanc scoring the first goal in the Estadio Tamaulipas.

In 1978, two additional levels of suites were constructed to bring the stadium to four levels of suites. In 2008, the Estadio Tamaulipas received the largest renovation in its history, Among the additions was a seating area for disabled fans, though its small size has been criticized as insufficient for playoff matches. In 2016, for safety and security purposes, capacity was reduced to 19,415 as part of a renovation that improved locker rooms and suites.

The pitch was flooded by storms in November 2016.

A potential replacement venue has been floated by Alejandro Irarragorri, president of Orlegi Deportes, one of the owners of Tampico Madero, who argued that the team's 85% average attendance rate, which leads the Ascenso MX, justified a new stadium.

The Mexico national football team played the Estadio Tamaulipas four times, though only twice against other national teams, meeting the Soviet Union national football team for a friendly on 2 February 1979 and the CIS national football team on 11 March 1992.

== See also ==
- List of football stadiums in Mexico
