= Petroleros de Salamanca C.F.C. =

- Full name: Petroleros de Salamanca Catedráticos Fútbol Club
- Nickname: Los Petroleros (The Oilers)
- Founded: 1958; 68 years ago 6 June 2026; 3 months ago, as “Petroleros de Salamanca C.F.C.
- Dissolved: 2024; 2 years ago
- Ground: Estadio El Molinito; Salamanca, Guanajuato, Mexico
- Capacity: 2,500
- Owner: Juan Manuel Durán
- Chairman: Juan Manuel Durán
- Manager: Ana María Zavala (Interim)
- League: Liga Premier - Serie A
- Clausura 2025: 12th, Group II
Home colours	Away colours

Petroleros de Salamanca C.F.C. is a Mexican football club based in Salamanca, Guanajuato, México which is playing in the Liga Premier de México.

== History ==
The club was founded in the 1950s and soon after, in 1958, the club joined the Segunda División de México and played under the name of Mapaches. The club played in the second division until 1961 when the club folded due to economic problems. In 1964 the club rejoined the second division; this time the club was owned by a local oil company which brought in big name players but never achieved a promotion to the first division. From 1964 the club would go on to play good to mediocre tournaments which finally came to an end once again in 1986 when the club folded and would not come this time for several years all time times playing under the name of Petroleros de Salamanca.

=== Awaited return ===
In 2001 the same oil company that had owned the club in the 1980s started up several professional clubs, the first a basketball club in 2001 which played under the name of Petroleros de Salamanca. In 2004 the football club finally made its return, quickly joining the Primera A. In 2006 the club reached its first final in the Primera A only to lose it to Puebla FC in a Penalty shoot out. The club would go on to play six more tournaments before the club was sold and relocated in La Piedad, Michoacán, where it became C.F. La Piedad.

=== Failed return to Liga Premier ===
In 2013 the team returned as Salamanca F.C., after spending several years in the Third Division of Mexico without winning promotion, on July 3, 2019 the team attempted to participate in the Liga Premier de México (Second Division) – Serie B, this after reaching an agreement with the Real Potosino's management, after the agreement, the team from San Luis Potosí had to move to Salamanca and be rebranded as Salamanca F.C. Finally on July 18, 2019 the Mexican Football Federation did not grant the guarantee for this change and Salamanca remained at Liga TDP, while Real Potosino stopped participating in Mexican football.

In 2020 due to financial problems, the club's board of directors rented its franchise to the Promotora Barajas Soccer, a soccer development center based in Tamazula de Gordiano, Jalisco. In 2021 the rental agreement was not renewed and the team officially ceased to participate.

In 2022 the team returned to participate in the professional leagues, being renamed C.F. Salamanca and based on the franchise Jaral del Progreso F.C. This team was dissolved at the end of the 2022–23 season due to the impossibility of competing with the new project that has arrived in the city.

=== Return to Liga Premier ===
On January 27, 2023 Catedráticos Elite F.C. was relocated from Ameca, Jalisco to Salamanca, Guanajuato. The relocation of the club occurred after a merger with Petroleros de Salamanca, because the local oil sector was interested in having a professional team in the city, for this reason the team was unofficially called Catedráticos Petroleros. On June 30, 2023, the team officially recovered the name Petroleros de Salamanca, however, due to administrative issues the team was officially renamed as Petroleros de Salamanca Catedráticos F.C. In 2024, the club suffered severe financial difficulties, causing them to fold. However, they were re-founded on the 6th of June 2026.

== Badge ==
In the early 1950s clubs usually used their city's crest as their own, so Salamanca used the city crest from 1958-1961. In the early 1970s the club used a crest which had an oil rig along with a soccer ball. In 2004 the club returned with a brand new crest but kept the oil rig and the soccer ball along with the club's colors.

First Badge 1958-61.

1970s-1986

Only used in 2004

2005-

== First kit evolution ==
1944 home	1960 home	2004 home	2006 home	2007 home	2008 home	2009 home	2010 home

== Season to season ==
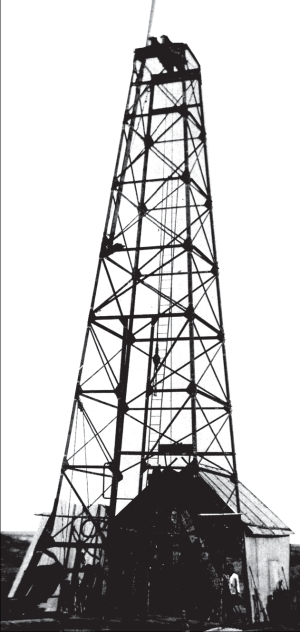
club is known for the oil tower.

Season	Division	Place
1958-59	2nd Division	
1959-60	2nd Division	
1960-61	2nd Division	
1961-64	Did not participate	
1964-65	2nd Division	
1965-66	2nd Division	
1966-67	2nd Division	
1967-68	2nd Division	
1968-69	2nd Division	
1969-70	2nd Division	
1970-71	2nd Division	
1971-72	2nd Division	
1972-73	2nd Division	
1973-74	2nd Division	
1974-75	2nd Division	
1975-76	2nd Division	
1976-77	2nd Division	
1977-78	2nd Division	
1978-79	2nd Division	
1979-80	2nd Division	
1980-81	2nd Division	
1981-82	2nd Division	
1982-83	2nd Division	
1983-84	2nd Division	
1984-85	2nd Division	
1985-86	2nd Division	

Season	Division	Place
1986–2003	Did not participate	
1996-97	Primera A	
Clausura 2004	Primera A	
Apertura 2005	Primera A	
Clausura 2006	Primera A	
Apertura 2006	Primera A	
Clausura 2007	Primera A	
Apertura 2007	Primera A	
Clausura 2008	Primera A	
Apertura 2008	Primera A	
Clausura 2009	Primera A	
Apertura 2009	2nd Division	
Bicentenario 2010	2nd Division	Disappeared after final of the season
2013–14	3rd División	
2014–15	3rd División	
2015–16	3rd División	
2016–17	3rd División	
2017–18	3rd División	
2018–19	Liga TDP	
2019–20	Liga TDP	
2020–21	Liga TDP	Franchise Loan to Carfut Barajas Soccer
2022–23	Liga TDP	Under Jaral del Progreso F.C.
Clausura 2023	Liga Premier	Under Catedráticos Elite franchise

- Has Played 28 Liga Premier Tournaments last in April 2023.
- Has Played 9 Primera A Tournaments last in 2009.
- Has Played 8 3rd División seasons last in April 2021.

== Coaching staff ==
Position	Staff
Manager	Vacant
Assistant managers	(Mexico) Ana María Zavala
Fitness coach	(Mexico) Martín Fonseca
Team doctor	(Mexico) Josué Julián Jurado

== Players ==
=== First-team squad ===
As of 26 August 2025

Note: Flags indicate national team as defined under FIFA eligibility rules; some limited exceptions apply. Players may hold more than one non-FIFA nationality.

No. / Pos. / Nation / Player	No. / Pos. / Nation / Player

=== Reserve teams ===
Catedráticos Elite
Reserve team that plays in the Liga TDP, the fourth level of the Mexican league system.

== Honours ==
=== Professional ===
- Primera División A: (0)

Runner-up (1): Apertura 2006

- Segunda División: (1)

Champion : 1951-1952

- Segunda División "B": (2)

Champion : 1984-1985, 1993-1994

== Notable former players ==
- (Mexico) "CHAPULIN" Duran
- (Mexico) 62 Omar Jaime
- (Mexico) Luis "SCOOBY" Cano
- (Mexico) 44 Cesar Saldivar
- (Mexico) "PAJARO" Rios
- (Mexico) 63 "BOCHA" Dominguez
- (Mexico) Alejandro Meza
- (Brazil) 60 Damasceno "TIBA"
- (Brazil) 48 Carlos Regis
- (Mexico) 33 Raul "AMULETO" Enriquez
- (Mexico) 51 Everardo Begines
- (Mexico) Casanova "CASAGOL"

== See also ==
- Estadio Sección XXIV
