= 2010–11 Tercera División de México season =

Tercera División Profesional
- Season: 2010–11
- Dates: 20 August 2010 – 28 May 2011
- Champions: Vaqueros de Ixtlán (1st title)
- Promoted: Vaqueros de Ixtlán
- Stats are from the regular season only

The 2010–11 Tercera División season is the fourth-tier football league of Mexico. The tournament began on 20 August 2010 and finished on 28 May 2011.

== Competition format ==
The Tercera División (Third Division) is divided into 14 groups. For the 2009/2010 season, the format of the tournament has been reorganized to a home and away format, which all teams will play in their respective group. The 14 groups consist of teams who are eligible to play in the liguilla de ascenso for one promotion spot, teams who are affiliated with teams in the Liga MX, Ascenso MX and Liga Premier, which are not eligible for promotion but will play that who the better filial team in an eight team filial playoff tournament for the entire season.

The league format allows participating franchises to rent their place to another team, so some clubs compete with a different name than the one registered with the FMF.

== Group 1 ==
Group with 14 teams from Campeche, Chiapas, Quintana Roo, Tabasco and Yucatán.

=== Teams ===
Location of teams in the 2010–11 3ra División Group 1 (Quintana Roo)
Location of teams in the 2010–11 3ra División Group 1 (Campeche City and Yucatán)
Location of teams in the 2010–11 3ra División Group 1 (Carmen (Campeche), Chiapas and Tabasco)

Team	City	Home ground	Capacity	Affiliate	Official name
Águilas de Tabasco	Teapa, Tabasco	Unidad Deportiva Teapa	1,000	–	–
Atlético Chiapas	Tuxtla Gutiérrez, Chiapas	Samuel León Brindis	4,000	Jaguares de Chiapas	–
Chetumal	Chetumal, Quintana Roo	José López Portillo	6,600	—	—
Corsarios de Campeche	Campeche, Campeche	Universitario de Campeche	4,000	—	—
Delfines de la UNACAR	Ciudad del Carmen, Campeche	Polideportivo UNACAR Campus II	8,000	–	–
Dragones de Tabasco	Villahermosa, Tabasco	Olímpico de Villahermosa	10,500	—	Real Victoria
Ejidatarios de Bonfil	Cancún, Quintana Roo	La Parcela	1,000	—	—
Huracanes de Cozumel	San Miguel de Cozumel, Quintana Roo	Unidad Deportiva Bicentenario	1,000	–	–
Inter Playa del Carmen	Playa del Carmen, Quintana Roo	Unidad Deportiva Mario Villanueva Madrid	7,500	Inter Playa del Carmen	—
Itzaes	Mérida, Yucatán	Unidad Deportiva Solidaridad	1,000	–	–
Jaguares de la 48	Reforma, Chiapas	Sergio Lira Gallardo	600	—	—
Maya Caribe	Playa del Carmen, Quintana Roo	Unidad Deportiva Luis Donaldo Colosio	1,000	Inter Playa del Carmen	—
Mérida	Mérida, Yucatán	Carlos Iturralde	20,000	Mérida	–
Pioneros Junior	Cancún, Quintana Roo	Cancún 86	6,390	Pioneros de Cancún	—

=== League table ===
Pos	Team	Pld	W	D	L	GF	GA	GD	Pts	Qualification or relegation
1	Chetumal	26	14	10	2	52	25	+27	60	Promotion play-offs
2	Mérida	26	18	3	5	69	30	+39	59	Promotion play-offs
3	Corsarios de Campeche	26	16	4	6	47	26	+21	54	Promotion play-offs
4	Huracanes de Cozumel	26	17	2	7	71	45	+26	53	Promotion play-offs
5	Atlético Chiapas	26	11	12	3	53	22	+31	52	
6	Delfines de la UNACAR	26	12	8	6	57	32	+25	48	
7	Inter Playa del Carmen	26	9	7	10	30	36	−6	38	
8	Pioneros Junior	26	9	7	10	43	45	−2	35	
9	Jaguares de la 48	26	9	6	11	36	45	−9	35	
10	Dragones de Tabasco	26	6	10	10	24	42	−18	33	
11	Ejidatarios de Bonfil	26	5	9	12	32	46	−14	31	
12	Itzaes	26	3	10	13	16	44	−28	22	
13	Maya Caribe	26	3	8	15	23	50	−27	20	
14	Águilas de Tabasco	26	0	4	22	4	69	−65	6	

Source: RSSSF

== Group 2 ==
Group with 14 teams from Oaxaca, Tabasco and Veracruz.

=== Teams ===
Location of teams in the 2010–11 3ra División Group 2 (Oaxaca, Tabasco and Southern Veracruz)
Location of teams in the 2010–11 3ra División Group 2 (Northern and Central Veraruz)

Team	City	Home ground	Capacity	Affiliate	Official Name
Académicos UGM	Orizaba, Veracruz	Universitario UGM	1,500	–	–
Atlético Boca del Río	Boca del Río, Veracruz	Unidad Deportiva Hugo Sánchez	1,500	—	–
Azucareros de Tezonapa	Tezonapa, Veracruz	Unidad Deportiva Ernesto Jácome	1,000	–	–
Caballeros de Córdoba	Córdoba, Veracruz	Rafael Murillo Vidal	3,800	–	–
Cheyennes de Huimanguillo	Huimanguillo, Tabasco	Unidad Deportiva de Huimanguillo	1,000	–	Once Hermanos
Cruz Azul Lagunas	Lagunas, Oaxaca	Cruz Azul	2,000	Cruz Azul	–
Lanceros de Cosoleacaque	Cosoleacaque, Veracruz	Unidad Deportiva Miguel Hidalgo	1,000	–	–
Naranjeros de Álamo	Juchitán de Zaragoza, Oaxaca	Municipal Juchiteco	1,000	–	–
Plateados de Cerro Azul	Cerro Azul, Veracruz	Carlos Hermosillo	1,000	–	–
Petroleros de Poza Rica	Poza Rica, Veracruz	Heriberto Jara Corona	10,000	—	—
Piñeros de Loma Bonita	Loma Bonita, Oaxaca	20 de Noviembre	1,000	–	–
Santos Casino	Córdoba, Veracruz	Rafael Murillo Vidal	3,800	Santos Laguna	–
Tiburones Rojos Boca del Río	Boca del Río, Veracruz	CAR Veracruz	1,000	Veracruz	–
Universidad Istmo Americana	Coatzacoalcos, Veracruz	Rafael Hernández Ochoa	4,800	–	–

=== League table ===
Pos	Team	Pld	W	D	L	GF	GA	GD	Pts	Qualification or relegation
1	Santos Casino	26	19	6	1	85	21	+64	67	Promotion play-offs
2	Lanceros de Cosoleacaque	26	19	6	1	68	18	+50	66	Promotion play-offs
3	Tiburones Rojos Boca del Río	26	14	10	2	81	27	+54	59	Promotion play-offs
4	Cruz Azul Lagunas	26	18	3	5	72	31	+41	58	Promotion play-offs
5	Petroleros de Poza Rica	26	16	3	7	68	29	+39	53	
6	Académicos UGM	26	13	7	6	55	34	+21	49	
7	Azucareros de Tezonapa	26	14	3	9	75	38	+37	46	
8	Caballeros de Córdoba	26	6	8	12	48	49	−1	29	
9	Piñeros de Loma Bonita	26	7	6	13	32	55	−23	29	
10	Universidad Istmo Americana	26	7	4	15	31	63	−32	28	
11	Atlético Boca del Río	26	5	5	16	32	68	−36	22	
12	Plateados de Cerro Azul	26	5	2	19	20	103	−83	17	
13	Naranjeros de Álamo	26	3	2	21	23	72	−49	13	
14	Cheyennes de Huimanguillo	26	2	3	21	23	105	−82	10	

Source: RSSSF

== Group 3 ==
Group with 14 teams from Puebla, Tlaxcala and Veracruz.

=== Teams ===
Location of teams in the 2010–11 3ra División Group 3 (Puebla)
Location of teams in the 2010–11 3ra División Group 3 (Tlaxcala)
Location of teams in the 2010–11 3ra División Group 3 (Veracruz)

Team	City	Home ground	Capacity	Affiliate	Official name
Águilas del Altiplano	Tlaxcala City, Tlaxcala	Santa Cruz IMSS	4,000	–	Real San Cosme
Albinegros de Orizaba	Orizaba, Veracruz	EMSA	1,500	–	–
Anlesjeroka	Tehuacán, Puebla	Anlesjeroka	400	Guadalajara	–
Delfines UGM	Orizaba, Veracruz	Universitario UGM	1,500	–	–
Estudiantes de Xalapa	Xalapa, Veracruz	Antonio M. Quirasco	3,000	–	–
Guerreros de Atlixco	Atlixco, Puebla	Campo IXTAC	1,000	–	Ocotlán F.C.
Héroes de Veracruz	Boca del Río, Veracruz	Facultad de Educación Física	1,000	–	Conejos de Tuxpan
Lanzamex Atlixco	Atlixco, Puebla	Campo El Potrero	500	–	–
Lobos de Tlaxcala	Tlaxcala City, Tlaxcala	San José del Agua	1,000	–	–
Limoneros de Martínez de la Torre	Martínez de la Torre, Veracruz	El Cañizo	3,000	–	–
Lobos BUAP	Puebla City, Puebla	Ciudad Universitaria Puebla	1,000	Lobos BUAP	–
Tehuacán	Tehuacán, Puebla	Empastado Peñafiel	1,000	–	–
Teziutlán Sporting	Teziutlán, Puebla	Municipal de Teziutlán	7,000	–	Héroes de Veracruz
Tulyehualco	Puebla City, Puebla	Centro Escolar Niños Héroes	500	–	–

=== League table ===
Pos	Team	Pld	W	D	L	GF	GA	GD	Pts	Qualification or relegation
1	Albinegros de Orizaba	26	17	3	6	60	34	+26	57	Promotion play-offs
2	Limoneros de Martínez de la Torre	26	17	3	6	51	32	+19	56	Promotion play-offs
3	Lobos BUAP	26	14	8	4	65	32	+33	55	Promotion play-offs
4	Lobos de Tlaxcala	26	15	4	7	50	26	+24	50	Promotion play-offs
5	Tulyehualco	26	15	3	8	57	27	+30	49	
6	Héroes de Veracruz	26	13	5	8	43	28	+15	48	
7	Lanzamex Atlixco	26	13	3	10	45	39	+6	45	
8	Tehuacán	26	12	5	9	40	31	+9	43	
9	Teziutlán Sporting	26	9	8	9	33	41	−8	41	
10	Estudiantes de Xalapa	26	11	5	10	46	50	−4	39	
11	Delfines UGM	26	5	6	15	34	53	−19	23	
12	Anlesjeroka	26	4	8	14	35	59	−24	21	
13	Águilas del Altiplano	26	2	2	22	28	89	−61	9	
14	Guerreros de Atlixco	26	1	3	22	32	83	−51	7	

Source: RSSSF

== Group 4 ==
Group with 13 teams from Guerrero, Mexico City, Morelos, Oaxaca and Puebla.

=== Teams ===
Location of teams in the 2010–11 3ra División Group 4 (Morelos)
Location of teams in the 2010–11 3ra División Group 4 (Guerrero, Mexico City and Oaxaca)

Team	City	Home ground	Capacity	Affiliate	Official name
Atlético Cuernavaca	Cuernavaca, Morelos	Municipal Mazatepec	1,000	–	–
Ballenas Galeana Morelos	Xochitepec, Morelos	Campo Escuela Miguel Alemán	2,500	–	–
Chapulineros de Oaxaca	Oaxaca City, Oaxaca	Benito Juárez	12,500	–	–
Chilpancingo	Chilpancingo, Guerrero	Unidad Deportiva Vicente Guerrero	1,000	–	–
Cuautla Yeca Juvenil	Cuautla, Morelos	Isidro Gil Tapia	5,000	Cuautla	–
Frailes Homape	Xochimilco, Mexico City	Seminario Menor Acoxpa	800	–	–
Guerreros de Yecapixtla	Zacualpan de Amilpas, Morelos	Unidad Deportiva Zacualpan	1,000	–	–
Real Olmeca Sport	Iztacalco, Mexico City	El Ocotal	500	–	–
Real Yáñez	Zapata, Morelos	General Emiliano Zapata	2,000	–	ECA Norte
Reales de Puebla	Puebla City, Puebla	Unidad Deportiva Mario Vázquez Raña	800	–	–
Serpientes de Chinconcuac	Zapata, Morelos	Territorio Serpientes	500	–	Zapata
Tigrillos Dorados MRCI	San Jerónimo Tlacochahuaya, Oaxaca	Campo Independiente MRCI	3,000	–	–
Zacatepetl	Zacatepec, Morelos	Agustín Coruco Díaz	16,000	–	–

=== League table ===
Pos	Team	Pld	W	D	L	GF	GA	GD	Pts	Qualification or relegation
1	Ballenas Galeana Morelos	24	18	5	1	66	23	+43	61	Promotion play-offs
2	Zacatepetl	24	18	3	3	80	22	+58	58	Promotion play-offs
3	Tigrillos Dorados MRCI	24	13	6	5	61	25	+36	48	Promotion play-offs
4	Chilpancingo	24	12	7	5	60	23	+37	47	Promotion play-offs
5	Chapulineros de Oaxaca	24	11	7	6	59	28	+31	45	
6	Guerreros de Yecapixtla	24	8	10	6	53	48	+5	38	
7	Atlético Cuernavaca	24	9	6	9	35	31	+4	38	
8	Serpientes de Chiconcuac	24	10	5	9	64	57	+7	37	
9	Cuautla Yeca Juvenil	24	8	8	8	42	41	+1	35	
10	Frailes Homape	24	5	7	12	33	50	−17	26	
11	Real Yáñez	24	6	4	14	42	51	−9	24	
12	Reales de Puebla	24	2	2	20	22	77	−55	9	
13	Real Olmeca Sport	24	0	2	22	8	149	−141	2	

Source: RSSSF

== Group 5 ==
Group with 16 teams from Greater Mexico City.

=== Teams ===
Location of teams in the 2010–11 3ra División Group 5 (Greater Mexico City urban area)
Location of teams in the 2010–11 3ra División Group 5 (Greater Mexico City rural area)

Team	City	Home ground	Capacity	Affiliate	Official name
Ajax Jiutepec	Iztapalapa, Mexico City	Deportivo Francisco I. Madero	2,000	–	–
Álamos	Venustiano Carranza, Mexico City	Magdalena Mixhuca Sports City	500	–	–
Aragón GAM	Gustavo A. Madero, Mexico City	Deportivo Francisco Zarco	500	Pachuca	Azules de la Sección 26
Cobijeros de Chiconcuac	Huixquilucan de Degollado, State of Mexico	Alberto Pérez Navarro	3,000	–	–
Coyotes Neza	Ciudad Nezahualcóyotl, State of Mexico	Metropolitano	4,000	–	–
Ixtapaluca	Ixtapaluca, State of Mexico	Campo Guadalupe 1	500	–	–
Deportivo Iztacalco	Chalco, State of Mexico	La Granja	1,500	–	–
Lobos Unión Neza	Ciudad Nezahualcóyotl, State of Mexico	Deportivo Francisco I. Madero	2,000	–	–
Novillos Neza	Ciudad Nezahualcóyotl, State of Mexico	Bicentenario Ciudad Jardín	6,000	–	–
Pato Baeza	Texcoco de Mora, State of Mexico	Centro de Fútbol Pato Baeza	1,000	–	–
Pelicanos de Cuautitlán	Ciudad Nezahualcóyotl, State of Mexico	Metropolitano	4,000	–	–
Promodep Central	Venustiano Carranza, Mexico City, Venustiano Carranza	Deportivo Plutarco Elías Calles	2,500	–	–
Sporting Canamy	Iztapalapa, Mexico City	Deportivo Francisco I. Madero	2,000	–	–
Texcoco	Texcoco de Mora, State of Mexico	Municipal Claudio Suárez	4,000	–	–
Vaqueros	Tepotzotlán, State of Mexico	Municipal Miguel Alemán	1,000	–	–
Venados del Estado de México	Ciudad Nezahualcóyotl, State of Mexico	Metropolitano	4,000	–	–

=== League table ===
Pos	Team	Pld	W	D	L	GF	GA	GD	Pts	Qualification or relegation
1	Cobijeros de Chiconcuac	30	25	2	3	137	29	+108	78	Promotion play-offs
2	Coyotes Neza	30	23	5	2	103	36	+67	77	Promotion play-offs
3	Texcoco	30	21	5	4	118	40	+78	70	Promotion play-offs
4	Álamos	30	20	5	5	68	27	+41	69	Promotion play-offs
5	Aragón GAM	30	19	2	9	70	35	+35	61	Promotion play-offs
6	Pato Baeza	30	13	7	10	60	51	+9	51	
7	Vaqueros	30	13	7	10	48	45	+3	50	
8	Ajax Jiutepec	30	10	5	15	42	58	−16	37	
9	Venados del Estado de México	30	11	4	15	45	71	−26	37	
10	Lobos Unión Neza	30	11	2	17	44	61	−17	35	
11	Promodep Central	30	10	3	17	43	73	−30	34	
12	Pelicanos de Cuautitlán	30	9	3	18	36	55	−19	31	
13	Ixtapaluca	30	7	4	19	32	54	−22	27	
14	Deportivo Iztacalco	30	5	4	21	31	114	−83	21	
15	Novillos Neza	30	5	3	22	31	88	−57	20	
16	Sporting Canamy	30	6	1	23	22	99	−77	19	

Source: RSSSF

== Group 6 ==
Group with 14 teams from State of Mexico.

Location of teams in the 2010–11 3ra División Group 6

=== Teams ===
Team	City	Home ground	Capacity	Affiliate	Official name
Atlético UEFA	Chalco, State of Mexico	La Granja	1,500	–	–
Estudiantes de Atlacomulco	Atlacomulco, State of Mexico	Ignacio Pichardo Pagaza	2,000	–	–
Grupo Sherwood	Toluca, State of Mexico	Instituto Tecnológico de Toluca	1,000	–	–
Huixquilucan	Huixquilucan de Degollado, State of Mexico	Colegio Anglo Americano	300	–	–
Ixtlahuaca	Ixtlahuaca, State of Mexico	Municipal de Ixtlahuaca	2,000	–	Texcaltitlán
Jilotepec	Jilotepec, State of Mexico	Rubén Chávez Chávez	2,000	–	–
Manchester Zapateros	San Mateo Atenco, State of Mexico	Municipal de San Mateo Atenco	3,000	–	C.D. Lerma
Metepec	Metepec, State of Mexico	Jesús Lara	1,200	–	–
Potros UAEM	Toluca, State of Mexico	Alberto "Chivo" Córdoba	32,603	Potros UAEM	–
Real Halcones	Atizapán de Zaragoza, State of Mexico	Deportivo Ana Gabriela Guevara	2,500	–	–
Tejupilco	Tejupilco, State of Mexico	Unidad Deportiva Tejupilco	1,000	–	–
Tepalcapa	Cuautitlán Izcalli, State of Mexico	San Juan Atlamica	1,000	–	–
Tolcayuca	Chalco, State of Mexico	Pumas Chalco	500	–	–
Tuzos Cuautitlán	Cuautitlán, State of Mexico	Los Pinos	5,000	–	–

=== League table ===
Pos	Team	Pld	W	D	L	GF	GA	GD	Pts	Qualification or relegation
1	Tuzos Cuautitlán	26	20	3	3	96	20	+76	66	Promotion play-offs
2	Potros UAEM	26	18	6	2	82	29	+53	63	Promotion play-offs
3	Real Halcones	26	17	3	6	88	35	+53	55	Promotion play-offs
4	Tejupilco	26	15	5	6	57	26	+31	53	Promotion play-offs
5	Manchester Zapateros	26	14	7	5	51	32	+19	50	
6	Jilotepec	26	13	4	9	54	34	+20	47	
7	Estudiantes de Atlacomulco	26	11	7	8	46	26	+20	44	
8	Tolcayuca	26	11	8	7	42	23	+19	42	
9	Ixtlahuaca	26	10	6	10	46	60	−14	39	
10	Grupo Sherwood	26	11	3	12	50	44	+6	38	
11	Metepec	26	4	3	19	25	53	−28	17	
12	Tepalcapa	26	3	4	19	13	83	−70	14	
13	Huixquilucan	26	2	4	20	20	69	−49	13	
14	Atlético UEFA	26	1	1	24	10	146	−136	4	

Source: RSSSF

== Group 7 ==
Group with 14 teams from Hidalgo, Mexico City and State of Mexico.

=== Teams ===
Location of teams in the 2010–11 3ra División Group 7 (Hidalgo)
Location of teams in the 2010–11 3ra División Group 7 (Mexico City and State of Mexico)

Team	City	Home ground	Capacity	Affiliate	Official name
Águilas de Teotihuacán	Acolman, State of Mexico	Municipal Acolman	1,200	–	–
Alto Rendimiento Tuzo	San Agustín Tlaxiaca, Hidalgo	Universidad del Fútbol	1,000	Pachuca	–
Atlético Hidalgo	Pachuca, Hidalgo	La Higa	1,000	–	–
Atlético Huejutla	Huejutla de Reyes, Hidalgo	Carlos Fayad	1,000	–	–
Aztecas AMF Soccer	Pachuca, Hidalgo	Club Hidalguense	800	–	–
Cielo Azul	Gustavo A. Madero, Mexico City	Deportivo Los Galeana	2,500	–	–
Cruz Azul Dublán	Ciudad Cooperativa Cruz Azul, Hidalgo	10 de Diciembre	17,000	Cruz Azul	–
Morelos Ecatepec	Ecatepec, State of Mexico	Morelos	2,000	–	–
Pachuca Juniors	San Agustín Tlaxiaca, Hidalgo	Universidad del Fútbol	1,000	Pachuca	–
Parque Acuático Te-Pathé	Ixmiquilpan, Hidalgo	Parque Acuático Te-Pathé	500	–	–
Santiago Tulantepec	Santiago Tulantepec, Hidalgo	Unidad Deportiva Conrado Muntane	1,000	–	–
Tuzos Pachuca	San Agustín Tlaxiaca, Hidalgo	Universidad del Fútbol	1,000	Pachuca	–
Unión Acolman	Acolman, State of Mexico	Municipal Acolman	1,200	–	–
Universidad del Fútbol	San Agustín Tlaxiaca, Hidalgo	Universidad del Fútbol	1,000	Pachuca	–

=== League table ===
Pos	Team	Pld	W	D	L	GF	GA	GD	Pts	Qualification or relegation
1	Cruz Azul Dublán	26	19	5	2	90	15	+75	64	Reserve Teams play-offs
2	Cielo Azul	26	18	3	5	54	24	+30	59	Promotion play-offs
3	Aztecas AMF Soccer	26	16	4	6	62	28	+34	56	Promotion play-offs
4	Morelos Ecatepec	26	16	4	6	54	33	+21	53	Promotion play-offs
5	Atlético Huejutla	26	15	3	8	34	25	+9	50	Promotion play-offs
6	Santiago Tulantepec	26	14	6	6	48	18	+30	49	
7	Parque Acuático Te-Pathé	26	11	6	9	51	39	+12	41	
8	Universidad del Fútbol	26	10	5	11	32	43	−11	37	
9	Unión Acolman	26	7	5	14	25	43	−18	30	
10	Águilas de Teotihuacán	26	6	5	15	27	49	−22	27	
11	Pachuca Juniors	26	6	4	16	19	52	−33	24	
12	Alto Rendimiento Tuzo	26	6	3	17	21	81	−60	23	
13	Tuzos Pachuca	26	5	4	17	22	52	−30	20	
14	Atlético Hidalgo	26	3	3	20	17	54	−37	13	

Source: RSSSF

== Group 8 ==
Group with 14 teams from Greater Mexico City and Hidalgo.

=== Teams ===
Location of teams in the 2010–11 3ra División Group 8 (Greater Mexico City)
Location of teams in the 2010–11 3ra División Group 8 (Greater Mexico City rural area)

Team	City	Home ground	Capacity	Affiliate	Official name
Buendía	Iztapalapa, Mexico City	Deportivo Francisco I. Madero	2,000	–	–
CEFOR Cuauhtémoc Blanco	Venustiano Carranza, Mexico City	Deportivo Plutarco Elías Calles	1,000	–	–
Esmeralda	Atizapan de Zaragoza, State of Mexico	Deportivo Ana Gabriela Guevara	2,500	–	–
Halcones del Valle del Mezquital	Gustavo A. Madero, Mexico City	Deportivo Los Galeana	2,000	–	–
Independiente Mexiquense	Cuautitlán, State of Mexico	Los Pinos	5,000	–	–
Panteras de Lindavista	Gustavo A. Madero, Mexico City	Deportivo Plutarco Elías Calles	1,000	–	–
Plateros	Iztacalco, Mexico City	Jesús Martínez "Palillo"	6,000	–	–
Potros de Hierro	Huixquilucan de Degollado, State of Mexico	Universidad Anáhuac México Norte	300	Atlante	–
San José del Arenal	Chalco, State of Mexico	Joaquín Iracheta	2,000	–	–
Satélites de Tulancingo	Tulancingo, Hidalgo	Primero de Mayo	5,000	–	Titán Soccer
Teca Huixquilucan	Venustiano Carranza, Mexico City	Magdalena Mixhuca Sports City	500	–	Tecamachalco
Tecamachalco	Huixquilucan de Degollado, State of Mexico	Alberto Pérez Navarro	3,000	–	Tecamachalco
Tultitlán	Tultitlán, State of Mexico	Deportivo Cartagena	1,000	–	–
Vikingos de Chalco	Tecámac, State of Mexico	Deportivo Sierra Hermosa	1,000	–	–

=== League table ===
Pos	Team	Pld	W	D	L	GF	GA	GD	Pts	Qualification or relegation
1	CEFOR Cuauhtémoc Blanco	26	19	5	2	77	26	+51	65	Promotion play-offs
2	Potros de Hierro	26	19	4	3	76	36	+40	64	Promotion play-offs
3	Tecamachalco	26	20	1	5	90	33	+57	62	Promotion play-offs
4	Buendía	26	18	1	7	74	36	+38	56	Promotion play-offs
5	Satélites de Tulancingo	26	14	6	6	43	31	+12	50	
6	Esmeralda	26	15	2	9	50	36	+14	48	
7	Vikingos de Chalco	26	12	3	11	48	47	+1	40	
8	Halcones del Valle del Mezquital	26	10	7	9	40	44	−4	40	
9	Independiente Mexiquense	26	8	4	14	34	56	−22	30	
10	Plateros	26	7	4	15	39	54	−15	26	
11	Teca Huixquilucan	26	3	9	14	20	40	−20	21	
12	Tultitlán	26	2	7	17	25	79	−54	17	
13	Panteras de Lindavista	26	3	4	19	24	71	−47	16	
14	San José del Arenal	26	2	3	21	23	74	−51	11	

Source: RSSSF

== Group 9 ==
Group with 15 teams from Guanajuato, Guerrero, Michoacán and Querétaro.

=== Teams ===
Location of teams in the 2010–11 3ra División Group 9 (Guanajuato and Querétaro)
Location of teams in the 2010–11 3ra División Group 9 (Guerrero)
Location of teams in the 2010–11 3ra División Group 9 (Michoacán)

Team	City	Home ground	Capacity	Affiliate	Official name
Aztecas Colón Querétaro	Querétaro City, Querétaro	Municipal de Querétaro	12,000	–	–
Delfines de Abasolo	Abasolo, Guanajuato	Municipal de Abasolo	2,500	–	–
Deportivo Corregidora	Corregidora, Querétaro	Parque Bicentenario	1,000	–	–
Felinos de Querétaro	Querétaro City, Querétaro	Campo Galeras	500	–	Atlético Iztacalco
Gallos Blancos de Zihuatanejo	Zihuatanejo, Guerrero	Unidad Deportiva Municipal Zihuatanejo	2,000	Querétaro	–
Jaral del Progreso	Jaral del Progreso, Guanajuato	Unidad Deportiva Municipal	1,000	–	–
Juventud Cuerera	León, Guanajuato	Campo IMSS	1,000	–	–
Limoneros de Apatzingán	Apatzingán, Michoacán	Unidad Deportiva Adolfo López Mateos	5,000	Monarcas Morelia	–
Monarcas Zacapu	Zacapu, Michoacán	Municipal de Zacapu	2,500	Monarcas Morelia	–
Peces Blancos de Pátzcuaro	Pátzcuaro, Michoacán	Unidad Deportiva de Pátzcuaro	3,000	–	–
San José Iturbide	San José Iturbide, Guanajuato	Unidad Deportiva Battaglia	2,000	–	Deportivo Neza
San Juan del Río	San Juan del Río, Querétaro	Unidad Deportiva Norte	1,000	–	–
Santa Rosa	Querétaro, Querétaro	Parque Bicentenario	1,000	–	–
Zarzeros de Tacámbaro	Tacámbaro, Michoacán	La Carolina	2,000	–	–
Zitácuaro	Zitácuaro, Michoacán	Ignacio López Rayón	10,000	–	–

=== League table ===
Pos	Team	Pld	W	D	L	GF	GA	GD	Pts	Qualification or relegation
1	Monarcas Zacapu	28	24	4	0	82	11	+71	80	Promotion play-offs
2	Limoneros de Apatzingán	28	17	7	4	61	36	+25	60	Promotion play-offs
3	Gallos Blancos de Zihuatanejo	28	18	2	8	75	34	+41	58	Promotion play-offs
4	Delfines de Abasolo	28	18	3	7	42	13	+29	58	Promotion play-offs
5	Zitácuaro	28	15	5	8	35	21	+14	52	
6	Jaral del Progreso	28	13	6	9	55	39	+16	47	
7	Zarzeros de Tacámbaro	28	12	5	11	31	42	−11	43	
8	Juventud Cuerera	28	8	11	9	38	37	+1	42	
9	Felinos de Querétaro	28	9	6	13	38	43	−5	36	
10	Peces Blancos de Pátzcuaro	28	8	6	14	32	41	−9	34	
11	Deportivo Corregidora	28	8	7	13	31	40	−9	32	
12	Aztecas Colón Querétaro	28	6	6	16	31	56	−25	27	
13	Santa Rosa	28	5	5	18	26	70	−44	22	
14	San Juan del Río	28	3	6	19	23	67	−44	20	
15	San José Iturbide	28	5	3	20	29	79	−50	19	

Source: RSSSF

== Group 10 ==
Group with 17 teams from Aguascalientes, Durango, Guanajuato, Jalisco, Michoacán and Zacatecas.

=== Teams ===
Location of teams in the 2010–11 3ra División Group 10 (Guanajuato)
Location of teams in the 2010–11 3ra División Group 10 (Aguascalientes, Durango and Zacatecas)
Location of teams in the 2010–11 3ra División Group 10 (Jalisco and Michoacán)

Team	City	Home ground	Capacity	Affiliate	Official name
Atlético Bajío	León, Guanajuato	Unidad Deportiva Enrique Fernández Martínez	1,500	–	–
Atlético ECCA	León, Guanajuato	La Martinica	14,000	–	–
Atlético San Francisco	San Francisco del Rincón, Guanajuato	Domingo Velázquez	3,500	–	–
Cabezas Rojas	León, Guanajuato	Club Cabezas Rojas	1,000	León	–
Cachorros León	León, Guanajuato	Casa Club León	1,000	–	–
Celaya	Celaya, Guanajuato	Miguel Alemán Valdés	23,182	Celaya	–
Colegio Guanajuato	León, Guanajuato	Colegio Guanajuato	1,000	–	–
Deportivo El Milagro	San Juan de los Lagos, Jalisco	Antonio R. Márquez	1,500	–	–
Diablos UJED	Durango City, Durango	Unidad Deportiva CCH UJED	1,000	–	–
El Pradito Lagos de Moreno	Lagos de Moreno, Jalisco	Salvador Chava Reyes	2,500	–	Atlético Cocula
Guayaberos de Calvillo	Calvillo, Aguascalientes	Parque Infantil Benito Juárez	1,000	–	–
Libertadores de Pénjamo	Pénjamo, Guanajuato	Pablo Herrera	1,500	–	–
Mineros de Fresnillo	Fresnillo, Zacatecas	Minera Fresnillo	6,000	–	–
Real Leonés	León, Guanajuato	Club Empress	500	–	–
Real Zamora	Zamora, Michoacán	Unidad Deportiva El Chamizal	5,000	–	–
Tuzos UAZ	Zacatecas, Zacatecas	Universitario Unidad Deportiva Norte	5,000	Tuzos UAZ	–
Unión León	León, Guanajuato	Club Empress	500	–	–

=== League table ===
Pos	Team	Pld	W	D	L	GF	GA	GD	Pts	Qualification or relegation
1	Cachorros León	32	21	7	4	69	29	+40	74	Promotion play-offs
2	Tuzos UAZ	32	21	6	5	81	31	+50	72	Promotion play-offs
3	Unión León	32	18	6	8	58	36	+22	64	Promotion play-offs
4	Atlético San Francisco	32	17	8	7	64	37	+27	63	Promotion play-offs
5	Colegio Guanajuato	32	16	6	10	46	33	+13	59	Promotion play-offs
6	Real Zamora	32	13	12	7	54	44	+10	57	
7	Atlético ECCA	32	14	9	9	49	36	+13	55	
8	Atlético Bajío	32	15	6	11	75	43	+32	54	
9	Real Leonés	32	13	10	9	37	34	+3	54	
10	Celaya	32	13	7	12	45	33	+12	52	
11	Libertadores de Pénjamo	32	10	10	12	44	49	−5	44	
12	Diablos UJED	32	11	6	15	43	49	−6	40	
13	El Pradito Lagos de Moreno	32	7	9	16	58	77	−19	35	
14	Cabezas Rojas	32	8	5	19	38	57	−19	32	
15	Guayaberos de Calvillo	32	5	7	20	34	93	−59	23	
16	Deportivo El Milagro	32	3	7	22	25	94	−69	20	
17	Mineros de Fresnillo	32	4	5	23	27	72	−45	18	

Source: RSSSF

== Group 11 ==
Group with 15 teams from Colima, Jalisco and Michoacán.

=== Teams ===
Location of teams in the 2010–11 3ra División Group 11

Team	City	Home ground	Capacity	Affiliate	Official name
Arandas	Arandas, Jalisco	Unidad Deportiva Gustavo Díaz Ordaz	1,500	–	–
Atlético Tecomán	Tecomán, Colima	Unidad Deportiva José González	1,000	–	–
Atotonilco	Atotonilco El Alto, Jalisco	Unidad Deportiva Margarito Ramírez	1,500	–	–
Charales de Chapala	Chapala, Jalisco	Municipal Juan Rayo	1,200	–	–
Colegio Once México	Zapopan, Jalisco	Colegio Once México	3,000	–	Oro
Deportivo Acatic	Acatic, Jalisco	Unidad Deportiva Acatic	1,000	–	–
Escuela de Fútbol Chivas	Zapopan, Jalisco	Verde Valle	2,000	Guadalajara	–
MRH Soccer Manzanillo	Manzanillo, Colima	Gustavo Vázquez	4,000	–	Mineros Real Hidalgo
Nuevos Valores de Occidente	Tonalá, Jalisco	Unidad Deportiva Revolución Mexicana	3,000	Leones Negros UdeG	–
Tepatitlán	Tepatitlán, Jalisco	Gregorio "Tepa" Gómez	10,000	–	–
Valle del Grullo	Juanacatlán, Jalisco	Club Juanacatlán	800	–	–
Vaqueros	Tlaquepaque, Jalisco	Club Vaqueros	1,000	–	–
Vaqueros de Ixtlán	Tlaquepaque, Jalisco	Club Vaqueros	1,000	–	–
Volcanes de Colima	Quesería, Colima	Carlos Septién	1,000	–	–
Yurécuaro	Yurécuaro, Michoacán	Unidad Deportiva Centenario	1,000	–	–

=== League table ===
Pos	Team	Pld	W	D	L	GF	GA	GD	Pts	Qualification or relegation
1	Vaqueros de Ixtlán	28	21	4	3	85	17	+68	70	Promotion play-offs
2	Atotonilco	28	21	4	3	67	23	+44	69	Promotion play-offs
3	Vaqueros	28	20	5	3	89	31	+58	66	Promotion play-offs
4	Escuela de Fútbol Chivas	28	17	7	4	68	28	+40	62	Reserve Teams play-offs
5	Yurécuaro	28	16	7	5	81	25	+56	57	Promotion play-offs
6	Deportivo Acatic	28	13	6	9	41	30	+11	48	
7	Tepatitlán	28	9	10	9	43	41	+2	43	
8	Charales de Chapala	28	10	7	11	59	56	+3	41	
9	Colegio Once México	28	11	5	12	49	54	−5	41	
10	MRH Soccer Manzanillo	28	10	6	12	33	57	−24	40	
11	Nuevos Valores de Occidente	28	8	3	17	42	50	−8	29	
12	Arandas	28	8	2	18	46	69	−23	26	
13	Atlético Tecomán	28	5	6	17	38	84	−46	23	
14	Valle del Grullo	28	1	5	22	17	69	−52	11	
15	Volcanes de Colima	28	0	3	25	16	140	−124	4	

Source: RSSSF

== Group 12 ==
Group with 18 teams from Jalisco, Michoacán and Nayarit.

=== Teams ===
Location of teams in the 2010–11 3ra División Group 12 (Jalisco, Michoacán and Nayarit)

Team	City	Home ground	Capacity	Affiliate	Official name
Atlas	Zapopan, Jalisco	Club Atlas Chapalita	1,000	Atlas	–
Aves Blancas	Tepatitlán, Jalisco	Corredor Industrial	1,200	–	–
Ayotlán	Ayotlán, Jalisco	Chino Rivas	4,000	–	Atlético San Miguel
Cachorros Atotonilco	Zapopan, Jalisco	Club Deportivo La Primavera	3,000	Leones Negros UdeG	–
Cazcanes de Ameca	Ameca, Jalisco	Núcleo Deportivo y de Espectáculos Ameca	4,000	–	–
Deportivo Nayarit	Tepic, Nayarit	Centro de Desarrollo Marcelino Bernal	1,000	–	–
Dynamo Cocula	Zapopan, Jalisco	Multigol	500	Houston Dynamo	–
Estudiantes Tecos	Zapopan, Jalisco	Cancha Jorge Campos UAG	1,000	Estudiantes Tecos	–
Guadalajara	Zapopan, Jalisco	Verde Valle	800	Guadalajara	–
Ladrilleros de Tlajomulco	Tlajomulco, Jalisco	Unidad Deportiva Mariano Otero	3,000	–	–
Leones Negros UdeG Talpa	Talpa de Allende, Jalisco	Unidad Deportiva Halcón Peña	1,000	Leones Negros UdeG	–
Nacional	Guadalajara, Jalisco	Club Deportivo Occidente	1,000	–	–
Reboceritos de La Piedad	La Piedad, Michoacán	Club Alianza	500	La Piedad	–
Sahuayo	Sahuayo, Michoacán	Unidad Deportiva Municipal	1,500	Sahuayo	–
Tomatlán	Tomatlán, Jalisco	Alejandro Ruelas Ibarra	1,000	–	Club Deportivo y Social PV SC
Vaqueros Compostela	Compostela, Nayarit	Alameda	1,000	–	–
Vaqueros Nayarit	Ixtlán del Río, Nayarit	Unidad Deportiva Roberto Gómez Reyes	10,000	–	–
Zapotlanejo	Zapotlanejo, Jalisco	Miguel Hidalgo	1,500	–	–

=== League table ===
Pos	Team	Pld	W	D	L	GF	GA	GD	Pts	Qualification or relegation
1	Reboceritos de La Piedad	32	23	5	4	74	37	+37	79	Promotion play-offs
2	Guadalajara	32	20	8	4	102	33	+69	71	Reserve Teams play-offs
3	Atlas	32	21	5	6	79	29	+50	71	Reserve Teams play-offs
4	Dynamo Cocula	32	20	6	6	73	35	+38	68	Promotion play-offs
5	Deportivo Nayarit	32	16	7	9	53	40	+13	59	Promotion play-offs
6	Cazcanes de Ameca	32	15	7	10	61	50	+11	57	Promotion play-offs
7	Aves Blancas	32	15	8	9	48	39	+9	56	Promotion play-offs
8	Zapotlanejo	32	14	4	14	46	51	−5	46	
9	Ladrilleros de Tlajomulco	32	11	7	14	34	39	−5	44	
10	Cachorros Atotonilco	32	12	4	16	46	53	−7	42	
11	Leones Negros UdeG Talpa	32	11	6	15	35	42	−7	42	
12	Estudiantes Tecos	32	9	7	16	56	51	+5	39	
13	Tomatlán	32	10	3	19	39	74	−35	35	
14	Vaqueros Nayarit	32	9	6	17	37	67	−30	34	
15	Ayotlán	32	5	8	19	29	75	−46	28	
16	Nacional	32	6	5	21	41	96	−55	25	
17	Sahuayo	32	6	2	24	42	84	−42	20	
18	Vaqueros Compostela	0	0	0	0	0	0	0	0	Withdrew

Source: RSSSF

== Group 13 ==
Group with 18 teams from Coahuila, Nuevo León, San Luis Potosí and Tamaulipas.

=== Teams ===
Location of teams in the 2010–11 3ra División Group 13 (Tamasopo, S.L.P., Tamaulipas and Veracruz)
Location of teams in the 2010–11 3ra División Group 13 (Coahuila, Matehuala, S.L.P and Nuevo León)

Team	City	Home ground	Capacity	Affiliate	Official name
Alianza Unetefan	Guadalupe, Nuevo León	Unidad Deportiva La Talaverna	5,000	–	–
Atlético Altamira	Altamira, Tamaulipas	Lázaro Cárdenas	2,500	–	–
Correcaminos Matamoros	Matamoros, Tamaulipas	Pedro Salazar Maldonado	3,000	Correcaminos UAT	–
Correcaminos UAT	Ciudad Victoria, Tamaulipas	Universitario Eugenio Alvizo Porras	5,000	Correcaminos UAT	–
Coyotes de Saltillo	Saltillo, Coahuila	Olímpico Francisco I. Madero	7,000	–	–
Estudiantes Tecnológico de Nuevo Laredo	Nuevo Laredo, Tamaulipas	Olímpico del Tecnológico de Nuevo Laredo	1,200	–	–
Excélsior	General Escobedo, Nuevo León	Centro Deportivo Soriana	2,000	Excélsior	–
Halcones de Saltillo	Saltillo, Coahuila	Olímpico Francisco I. Madero	7,000	–	–
Leones de Saltillo	Saltillo, Coahuila	Olímpico Francisco I. Madero	7,000	–	–
Jaguares de Nuevo León	San Nicolás de los Garza, Nuevo León	Unidad Deportiva Oriente	1,000	Alazapas de Sabinas	–
Mante	Ciudad Mante, Tamaulipas	Ignacio Zaragoza	1,000	–	–
Monterrey	Monterrey, Nuevo León	El Cerrito	1,000	Monterrey	–
Orinegros de Ciudad Madero	Ciudad Madero, Tamaulipas	Olímpico del Tecnológico de Madero	7,000	–	–
Oxitipa Ciudad Valles	Ciudad Valles, San Luis Potosí	Unidad Deportiva de Veteranos	1,000	–	–
Panteras Negras GNL	Guadalupe, Nuevo León	Unidad Deportiva La Talaverna	5,000	–	–
Tigres SD	General Zuazua, Nuevo León	La Cueva de Zuazua	800	Tigres UANL	–
Troyanos UDEM	San Pedro Garza García, Nuevo León	Universidad de Monterrey	1,000	–	–
Tuneros de Matehuala	Matehuala, San Luis Potosí	Manuel Moreno Torres	2,000	–	–

=== League table ===
Pos	Team	Pld	W	D	L	GF	GA	GD	Pts	Qualification or relegation
1	Correcaminos UAT	34	22	9	3	73	21	+52	82	Reserve Teams play-offs
2	Troyanos UDEM	34	22	10	2	100	27	+73	80	Promotion play-offs
3	Alianza Unetefan	34	23	3	8	62	32	+30	74	Promotion play-offs
4	Monterrey	34	19	8	7	74	51	+23	71	Reserve Teams play-offs
5	Excélsior	34	20	7	7	83	47	+36	70	Promotion play-offs
6	Mante	34	15	9	10	53	41	+12	59	Promotion play-offs
7	Tigres SD	34	16	7	11	71	52	+19	58	
8	Atlético Altamira	34	12	10	12	63	61	+2	51	Promotion play-offs
9	Estudiantes Tecnológico de Nuevo Laredo	34	13	6	15	37	51	−14	46	
10	Jaguares de Nuevo León	34	11	8	15	59	54	+5	45	
11	Orinegros de Ciudad Madero	33	9	10	14	49	52	−3	42	
12	Tuneros de Matehuala	34	11	4	19	47	68	−21	39	
13	Oxitipa Ciudad Valles	34	9	8	17	42	58	−16	38	
14	Correcaminos Matamoros	34	7	12	15	37	55	−18	38	
15	Leones de Saltillo	34	10	6	18	35	44	−9	37	
16	Panteras Negras GNL	33	7	8	18	33	65	−32	36	
17	Coyotes de Saltillo	34	7	7	20	33	87	−54	31	
18	Halcones de Saltillo	34	3	6	25	22	107	−85	18	

Source: RSSSF

== Group 14 ==
=== South ===
Group with 6 teams from Sinaloa and Sonora.

==== Teams ====
Location of teams in the 2010–11 3ra División Group 14 South

Team	City	Home ground	Capacity	Affiliate	Official name
Azucareros de Los Mochis	Los Mochis, Sinaloa	Centenario	11,134	–	–
Búhos de Hermosillo	Hermosillo, Sonora	El Oasis de los Búhos	1,000	–	–
Deportivo Guamúchil	Guamúchil, Sinaloa	Coloso del Dique	5,000	Murciélagos	–
Diablos Azules de Guasave	Guasave, Sinaloa	Armando "Kory" Leyson	9,000	–	–
Diablos de Hermosillo	Hermosillo, Sonora	Héroe de Nacozari	22,000	–	Lobos de Zihuatanejo
Dorados de Sinaloa	Culiacán, Sinaloa	Unidad Deportiva JAPAC	1,000	Dorados de Sinaloa	–

==== League table ====
Pos	Team	Pld	W	D	L	GF	GA	GD	Pts	Qualification or relegation
1	Diablos Azules de Guasave	20	13	4	3	51	20	+31	45	Promotion play-offs
2	Deportivo Guamúchil	20	11	5	4	42	24	+18	40	Promotion play-offs
3	Dorados de Sinaloa	20	9	5	6	48	25	+23	35	
4	Búhos de Hermosillo	20	9	2	9	34	33	+1	30	
5	Azucareros de Los Mochis	20	8	4	8	28	35	−7	30	
6	Diablos de Hermosillo	20	0	0	20	10	76	−66	0	

Source: RSSSF

=== North ===
Group with 7 teams from Baja California, Baja California Sur and Sonora.

==== Teams ====
Location of teams in the 2010–11 3ra División Group 14 North

Team	City	Home ground	Capacity	Affiliate	Official name
Ensenada	Ensenada, Baja California	Municipal de Ensenada	7,600	–	Cachanillas de Mexicali
Halcones de Tijuana	Tijuana, Baja California	Unidad Deportiva CREA	10,000	–	–
Héroes de Caborca	Caborca, Sonora	Fidencio Hernández	3,000	–	–
Indios Cucapá	San Luis Río Colorado, Sonora	México 70	2,000	–	–
Lobos de Cabo San Lucas	Cabo San Lucas, Baja California Sur	Complejo Deportivo Don Koll	3,500	–	–
Monarcas Tijuana	Tijuana, Baja California	Unidad Deportiva CREA	10,000	Monarcas Morelia	–
Tijuana	Tijuana, Baja California	Caliente	20,000	Tijuana	–

==== League table ====
Pos	Team	Pld	W	D	L	GF	GA	GD	Pts	Qualification or relegation
1	Tijuana	18	16	0	2	68	10	+58	48	Reserve Teams play-offs
2	Héroes de Caborca	18	11	4	3	42	18	+24	39	Promotion play-offs
3	Indios Cucapá	18	8	3	7	31	27	+4	29	Promotion play-offs
4	Monarcas Tijuana	18	4	2	12	24	39	−15	15	
5	Lobos de Cabo San Lucas	18	4	1	13	14	62	−48	13	
6	Halcones de Tijuana	0	0	0	0	0	0	0	0	Withdrew
7	Ensenada	0	0	0	0	0	0	0	0	Withdrew

Source: RSSSF

== Group 15 ==
Group with 15 teams from Chihuahua, Coahuila and Durango.

=== Teams ===
Location of teams in the 2010–11 3ra División Group 15

Team	City	Home ground	Capacity	Affiliate	Official name
Arenales de Cuauhtémoc	Cuauhtémoc, Chihuahua	Olímpico de Cuauhtémoc	1,500	–	Arenales NE
Calor UVM–San Pedro	San Pedro, Coahuila	Unidad Deportiva San Pedro	1,000	–	–
Calor UVM–Torreón	Torreón, Coahuila	UVM Torreón	1,000	–	Generales de Navojoa
Chinarras de Aldama	Aldama, Chihuahua	Ciudad Deportiva Chihuahua	4,000	–	–
Cobras Fútbol Premier	Chihuahua City, Chihuahua	Ciudad Deportiva Chihuahua	4,000	–	–
Colegio de Bachilleres Chihuahua	Chihuahua City, Chihuahua	Ciudad Deportiva Chihuahua	4,000	–	–
Colegio de Bachilleres Ciudad Juárez	Ciudad Juárez, Chihuahua	20 de Noviembre	2,500	–	–
Dorados Inter Chihuahua	Chihuahua City, Chihuahua	Club Barcelona	500	–	–
Halcones de Jiménez	Jiménez, Chihuahua	Alameda	1,000	–	–
Indios	Ciudad Juárez, Chihuahua	Complejo Yvasa	1,000	Indios	–
Leones de Chihuahua	Chihuahua City, Chihuahua	Ciudad Deportiva Chihuahua	4,000	–	–
Real Faraones Nuevo Casas Grandes	Nuevo Casas Grandes, Chihuahua	Revolución	1,000	–	–
Real Magari	Ciudad Juárez, Chihuahua	20 de Noviembre	2,500	–	–
Soles de Ciudad Juárez	Ciudad Juárez, Chihuahua	20 de Noviembre	2,500	–	–
Toros Laguna	Gómez Palacio, Durango	Unidad Deportiva Francisco Gómez Palacio	5,000	–	Aztecas Arandas

=== League table ===
Pos	Team	Pld	W	D	L	GF	GA	GD	Pts	Qualification or relegation
1	Indios	28	23	3	2	70	16	+54	73	Reserve Teams play-offs
2	Calor UVM–San Pedro	28	20	5	3	76	18	+58	68	Promotion play-offs
3	Soles de Ciudad Juárez	28	13	8	7	49	35	+14	51	Promotion play-offs
4	Calor UVM–Torreón	28	13	6	9	54	32	+22	50	Promotion play-offs
5	Toros Laguna	28	13	6	9	58	31	+27	48	Promotion play-offs
6	Colegio de Bachilleres Chihuahua	28	12	8	8	35	29	+6	48	
7	Dorados Inter Chihuahua	28	10	7	11	42	44	−2	43	
8	Real Magari	28	10	9	9	62	50	+12	41	
9	Chinarras de Aldama	28	10	4	14	36	37	−1	37	
10	Colegio de Bachilleres Ciudad Juárez	28	9	6	13	39	54	−15	37	
11	Real Faraones de Nuevo Casas Grandes	28	9	3	16	36	57	−21	32	
12	Cobras Fútbol Premier	28	7	9	12	27	40	−13	31	
13	Arenales de Cuauhtémoc	28	8	5	15	41	64	−23	31	
14	Halcones de Jiménez	28	7	3	18	27	62	−35	25	
15	Leones de Chihuahua	28	3	4	21	21	104	−83	15	

Source: RSSSF

== Promotion play-offs ==
=== Round of 64 ===
Team 1	Agg.	Team 2	1st leg	2nd leg
Chetumal	3–3 (4–5) (p.)	Huracanes de Cozumel	1–2	2–1
Mérida	2–1	Corsarios de Campeche	0–0	2–1
Santos Casino	6–0	Cruz Azul Lagunas	2–0	4–0
Lanceros de Cosoleacaque	(p.) 1–1 (5–4)	Tiburones Rojos Boca del Río	0–1	1–0
Cobijeros de Chiconcuac	2–1	Atlético Huejutla	0–1	2–0
Coyotes Neza	(p.) 2–2 (5–3)	Lobos de Tlaxcala	1–1	1–1
Ballenas Galeana Morelos	5–2	Chilpancingo	1–1	4–1
Tuzos Cuautitlán	4–3	Tigrillos Dorados MRCI	3–1	1–2
CEFOR Cuauhtémoc Blanco	6–0	Morelos Ecatepec	3–0	3–0
Potros de Hierro	5–2	Tejupilco	2–2	3–0
Potros UAEM	2–6	Lobos BUAP	2–0	0–6
Tecamachalco	3–4	Limoneros de Martínez de la Torre	0–4	3–0
Texcoco	6–4	Aztecas AMF Soccer	2–0	4–4
Álamos	7–3	Buendía	4–2	3–1
Cielo Azul	2–2 (4–5)(p.)	Albinegros de Orizaba	0–2	2–0
Zacatepetl	(p.) 1–1 (6–5)	Real Halcones	0–0	1–1
Monarcas Zacapu	(p.) 3–3 (4–2)	Atlético San Francisco	2–3	1–0
Cachorros León	3–0	Delfines de Abasolo	1–0	2–0
Tuzos UAZ	5–2	Gallos Blancos de Zihuatanejo	2–1	3–1
Limoneros de Apatzingán	1–2	Unión León	0–2	1–0
Dynamo Cocula	2–3	Vaqueros	1–2	1–1
Vaqueros de Ixtlán	2–1	Cazcanes de Ameca	1–1	1–0
Atotonilco	(p.) 3–3 (3–1)	Deportivo Nayarit	–	–
Reboceritos de La Piedad	3–5	Yurécuaro	1–3	2–2
Troyanos UDEM	(awd) X–X	Mante	X–X	X–X
Alianza Unetefan	3–0	Excélsior	2–0	1–0
Diablos Azules de Guasave	3–1	Indios Cucapá	3–1	0–0
Héroes de Caborca	2–1	Deportivo Guamúchil	0–1	2–0
Calor UVM–San Pedro	1–3	Toros Laguna	1–1	0–2
Soles de Ciudad Juárez	1–2	Calor UVM–Torreón	1–0	0–2
Aragón GAM	0–7	Aves Blancas	0–6	0–1
Colegio Guanajuato	4–1	Atlético Altamira	2–0	2–1

=== Round of 32 ===
Team 1	Agg.	Team 2	1st leg	2nd leg
Huracanes de Cozumel	3–5	Cobijeros de Chiconcuac	0–4	3–1
Santos Casino	10–1	Lobos BUAP	7–1	3–0
Coyotes Neza	4–2	Limoneros de Martínez de la Torre	0–1	4–1
Ballenas Galeana Morelos	3–2	Albinegros de Orizaba	1–1	2–1
Tuzos Cuautitlán	8–2	Mérida	3–2	5–0
CEFOR Cuauhtémoc Blanco	7–2	Tiburones Rojos Boca del Río	1–1	6–1
Potros de Hierro	2–3	Álamos	0–2	2–1
Zacatepetl	4–5	Texcoco	1–2	3–3
Monarcas Zacapu	7–2	Toros Laguna	3–2	4–0
Vaqueros	(awd) X–X	Colegio Guanajuato	X–X	X–X
Troyanos UDEM	2–3	Unión León	1–2	1–1
Cachorros León	1–8	Yurécuaro	0–2	1–6
Tuzos UAZ	2–4	Héroes de Caborca	1–4	1–0
Diablos Azules de Guasave	2–4	Alianza Unetefan	1–3	2–1
Vaqueros de Ixtlán	4–0	Aves Blancas	0–0	4–0
Atotonilco	5–1	Calor UVM–Torreón	1–0	4–1

=== Final stage ===
Round of 16
2S	Santos Casino	4	2	6
7S	Texcoco	0	0	0
4S	Ballenas Galeana Morelos	2	1	3
5S	Tuzos Cuautitlán	3	2	5
1S	Cobijeros de Chiconcuac	0	3	3
8S	Álamos	0	1	1
3S	Coyotes Neza	1	1	2
6S	CEFOR Cuauhtémoc Blanco	0	4	4
1N	Monarcas Zacapu	1	1	2
8N	Unión León	0	1	1
4N	Vaqueros (p.)	0	1	1 (4)
5N	Alianza Unetefan	1	0	1 (1)
2N	Vaqueros de Ixtlán	3	0	3
7S	Yurécuaro	0	0	0
3N	Atotonilco	0	3	3
6N	Héroes de Caborca	0	1	1

Quarter-finals
2S	Santos Casino (p.)	1	4	5 (7)
5S	Tuzos Cuautitlán	1	4	5 (6)
1S	Cobijeros de Chiconcuac	0	2	2
6S	CEFOR Cuauhtémoc Blanco	3	5	8
1N	Monarcas Zacapu	2	4	6
4N	Vaqueros	0	1	1
2N	Vaqueros de Ixtlán	1	1	2
3N	Atotonilco	0	0	0

Semi-finals
2S	Santos Casino	2	4	6
6S	CEFOR Cuauhtémoc Blanco	1	2	3
1N	Monarcas Zacapu	1	0	1
2N	Vaqueros de Ixtlán	2	0	2

Final
2S	Santos Casino	0	0	0
2N	Vaqueros de Ixtlán	1	1	2

==== Round of 16 ====
Team 1	Agg.	Team 2	1st leg	2nd leg
Santos Casino	6–1	Texcoco	4–0	2–1
Ballenas Galeana Morelos	3–5	Tuzos Cuautitlán	2–3	1–2
Cobijeros de Chiconcuac	3–1	Álamos	0–0	3–1
Coyotes Neza	2–4	CEFOR Cuauhtémoc Blanco	1–0	1–4
Monarcas Zacapu	2–1	Unión León	1–0	1–1
Vaqueros	(p.) 1–1 (4–1)	Alianza Unetefan	0–1	1–0
Vaqueros de Ixtlán	3–0	Yurécuaro	3–0	0–0
Atotonilco	3–1	Héroes de Caborca	0–0	3–1

===== First leg =====
4 May 2011	Álamos	0–0	Cobijeros de Chiconcuac	Mexico City
12:00		Report		Stadium: Magdalena Mixhuca Sports City; Attendance: 400; Referee: Omar Jaime Hernández

4 May 2011	Texcoco	0–4	Santos Casino	Texcoco, State of Mexico
15:00		Report	Román 6'; Bravo 34'; Ceballos 40'; Pérez 86'	Stadium: Estadio Municipal Claudio Suárez; Attendance: 300; Referee: Josué Roldán Amaro

4 May 2011	CEFOR Cuauhtémoc Blanco	0–1	Coyotes Neza	Mexico City
15:45		Report	Jaimes 86'	Stadium: Deportivo Plutarco Elías Calles; Attendance: 300; Referee: Adonai Escobedo González

4 May 2011	Tuzos Cuautitlán	3–2	Ballenas Galeana Morelos	Cuautitlán, State of Mexico
16:00	Durán 22'; Rosas 35', 88'	Report	Peña 74', 90+3'	Stadium: Estadio Los Pinos; Attendance: 500; Referee: Alejandro Meza Cardeña

4 May 2011	Unión León	0–1	Monarcas Zacapu	León, Guanajuato
17:00		Report	Ortiz 90'	Stadium: Club Empress; Attendance: 200; Referee: César Alfredo Venegas García

4 May 2011	Alianza Unetefan	1–0	Vaqueros	Guadalupe, Nuevo León
17:00	Ruíz 21'	Report		Stadium: Unidad Deportiva La Talaverna; Attendance: 100; Referee: Jesús Leopoldo Guerrero García

5 May 2011	Yurécuaro	0–3	Vaqueros de Ixtlán	Yurécuaro, Michoacán
16:00		Report	Martínez 43'; Suárez 59'; Mejía 90+1'	Stadium: Unidad Deportiva Centenario; Attendance: 1,400; Referee: Óscar Mejía García

5 May 2011	Héroes de Caborca	0–0	Atotonilco	Caborca, Sonora
20:00		Report		Stadium: Estadio Fidencio Hernández; Attendance: 500; Referee: Saúl Fernando Orozco Nájera

===== Second leg =====
7 May 2011	Vaqueros	1–0 (1–1 agg.) (4–1 p)	Alianza Unetefan	Tlaquepaque, Jalisco
11:00	Mendiola 43'	Report		Stadium: Club Vaqueros Ixtlán; Attendance: 200; Referee: Ricardo Olvera Hernández

7 May 2011	Coyotes Neza	1–4 (2–4 agg.)	CEFOR Cuauhtémoc Blanco	Ciudad Nezahualcóyotl, State of Mexico
12:00	Jaimes 55'	Report	de la Peña 6', 75'; Suárez 43'; Morales 48'	Stadium: Unidad Deportiva Bicentenario Ciudad Jardín; Attendance: 500; Referee: José Juan Contreras García

7 May 2011	Cobijeros de Chiconcuac	3–1 (3–1 agg.)	Álamos	Huixquilucan, State of Mexico
12:00	Garcés 5'; Salgado 20'; Navarro 83'	Report	Ruiz 62'	Stadium: Estadio Alberto Pérez Navarro; Attendance: 300; Referee: Carlos Manuel Mata Infante

7 May 2011	Ballenas Galeana Morelos	1–2 (3–5 agg.)	Tuzos Cuautitlán	Xochitepec, Morelos
16:00	Ortíz 52'	Report	Rosas 32'; Medina 82'	Stadium: Campo Escuela Miguel Alemán; Attendance: 2,500; Referee: Jorge Luis Delgado Salas

7 May 2011	Monarcas Zacapu	1–1 (2–1 agg.)	Unión León	Zacapu, Michoacán
17:00	Ortiz 85'	Report	Martínez 41'	Stadium: Estadio Municipal de Zacapu; Attendance: 1,500; Referee: Osvaldo Martínez López

7 May 2011	Santos Casino	2–1 (6–1 agg.)	Texcoco	Córdoba, Veracruz
18:00	González 31'; Bravo 58'	Report	Barrera 28'	Stadium: Unidad Deportiva Casino Español; Attendance: 500; Referee: Gonzalo Santiago García

8 May 2011	Atotonilco	3–1 (3–1 agg.)	Héroes de Caborca	Atotonilco El Alto, Jalisco
12:00	González 2'; Peña 49'; Galindo 56'	Report	Huerta 90+4'	Stadium: Unidad Deportiva Margarito Ramírez; Attendance: 400; Referee: Antonio de Jesús Olalde Vázquez

8 May 2011	Vaqueros de Ixtlán	0–0 (3–0 agg.)	Yurécuaro	Tlaquepaque, Jalisco
12:00		Report		Stadium: Club Vaqueros Ixtlán; Attendance: 300; Referee: Ángel Flores Galicia

==== Quarter-finals ====
Team 1	Agg.	Team 2	1st leg	2nd leg
Cobijeros de Chiconcuac	2–8	CEFOR Cuauhtémoc Blanco	0–3	2–5
Santos Casino	(p.) 5–5 (7–6)	Tuzos Cuautitlán	4–4	1–1
Monarcas Zacapu	6–1	Vaqueros	2–0	4–1
Vaqueros de Ixtlán	2–0	Atotonilco	1–0	1–0

===== First leg =====
11 May 2011	Vaqueros	0–2	Monarcas Zacapu	Tlaquepaque, Jalisco
11:00		Report	Guerrero 64'; Barrera 77'	Stadium: Club Vaqueros Ixtlán; Attendance: 200; Referee: Manuel Alejandro Amador Dorantes

11 May 2011	CEFOR Cuauhtémoc Blanco	3–0	Cobijeros de Chiconcuac	Mexico City
15:45	Vega 35', 37'; Díaz 90'	Report		Stadium: Deportivo Plutarco Elías Calles; Attendance: 300; Referee: Oswaldo Martínez López

11 May 2011	Tuzos Cuautitlán	4–4	Santos Casino	Cuautitlán, State of Mexico
16:00	J. Pérez 14'; Durán 37', 60'; Medina 89'	Report	Ceballos 12'; O. Pérez 31'; Román 43'; Vidal 85'	Stadium: Estadio Los Pinos; Attendance: 200; Referee: Marco Antonio Bisguerra Mendiola

12 May 2011	Atotonilco	0–1	Vaqueros de Ixtlán	Atotonilco El Alto, Jalisco
12:00		Report	Santana 3'	Stadium: Unidad Deportiva Margarito Ramírez; Attendance: 500; Referee: Jorge Luis Delgado Salas

===== Second leg =====
14 May 2011	Cobijeros de Chiconcuac	2–5 (2–8 agg.)	CEFOR Cuauhtémoc Blanco	Huixquilucan, State of Mexico
12:00	Hernández 48'; Iturralde 88'	Report	Pérez 43', 70', 89' de la Peña 71'; Morales 90'	Stadium: Estadio Alberto Pérez Navarro; Attendance: 200; Referee: José Aréchiga Antunez

14 May 2011	Monarcas Zacapu	4–0 (6–1 agg.)	Vaqueros	Zacapu, Michoacán
17:00	Dueñas 21'; Ortiz 50'; Guerrero 67'; Zaragoza 76'	Report	Mendiola 77'	Stadium: Estadio Municipal de Zacapu; Attendance: 2,000; Referee: Ángel Flores Galicia

14 May 2011	Santos Casino	1–1 (4–4 agg.) (7–6 p)	Tuzos Cuautitlán	Córdoba, Veracruz
18:00	Ceballos 82'	Report	Rosales 3'	Stadium: Unidad Deportiva Casino Español; Attendance: 500; Referee: José Juan Contreras García

15 May 2011	Vaqueros de Ixtlán	1–0 (2–0 agg.)	Atotonilco	Tlaquepaque, Jalisco
12:00	Ramos 59'	Report		Stadium: Club Vaqueros Ixtlán; Attendance: 1,000; Referee: Ricardo Olvera Hernández

==== Semi-finals ====
Team 1	Agg.	Team 2	1st leg	2nd leg
Santos Casino	6–3	CEFOR Cuauhtémoc Blanco	2–1	4–2
Monarcas Zacapu	1–2	Vaqueros de Ixtlán	1–2	0–0

===== First leg =====
18 May 2011	Vaqueros de Ixtlán	2–1	Monarcas Zacapu	Tlaquepaque, Jalisco
11:00	Martínez 31'; Fernández 89' (own)	Report	Campos 65'	Stadium: Club Vaqueros Ixtlán; Attendance: 200; Referee: Marco Antonio Bisguerra Mendiola

18 May 2011	CEFOR Cuahtémoc Blanco	1–2	Santos Casino	Mexico City
15:45	Acuña 76'	Report	Ceballos 60'; Flores 88'	Stadium: Deportivo Plutarco Elías Calles; Attendance: 200; Referee: Adonai Escobedo González

===== Second leg =====
21 May 2011	Monarcas Zacapu	0–0 (1–2 agg.)	Vaqueros de Ixtlán	Zacapu, Michoacán
17:00		Report		Stadium: Estadio Municipal de Zacapu; Attendance: 3,000; Referee: Marco Antonio Hernandez Ramirez

21 May 2011	Santos Casino	4–2 (6–3 agg.)	CEFOR Cuauhtémoc Blanco	Córdoba, Veracruz
18:00	Vidal 32'; Ceballos 37'; Román 69'; Ávila 72'	Report	de la Peña 2'; Pérez 25'	Stadium: Unidad Deportiva Casino Español; Attendance: 700

==== Final ====
Team 1	Agg.	Team 2	1st leg	2nd leg
Santos Casino	0–2	Vaqueros de Ixtlán	0–1	0–1

===== First leg =====
25 May 2011	Vaqueros de Ixtlán	1–0	Santos Casino	Tlaquepaque, Jalisco
11:00	Suárez 25'	Report		Stadium: Club Vaqueros Ixtlán; Attendance: 300; Referee: Marco Antonio Bisguerra Mendiola

===== Second leg =====
28 May 2011	Santos Casino	0–1 (0–2 agg.)	Vaqueros de Ixtlán	Córdoba, Veracruz
18:00		Report	Urciaga 73'	Stadium: Unidad Deportiva Casino Español; Attendance: 1,500; Referee: José Juan Contreras García

2010–11 winners

1st title

== Reserve teams play–offs ==
Quarter-finals
1	Tijuana	3	3	6
8	Monterrey	1	1	2
2	Indios	1	1	2 (12)
7	Escuela de Fútbol Chivas (p.)	2	0	2 (13)
3	Cruz Azul Dublán	3	1	4
6	Atlas	3	0	3
4	Correcaminos UAT (p.)	2	0	2 (4)
5	Guadalajara	0	2	2 (1)

Semi-finals
1	Tijuana	0	3	3
7	Escuela de Fútbol Chivas	2	0	2
3	Cruz Azul Dublán (p.)	0	2	2 (5)
4	Correcaminos UAT	1	1	2 (3)

Final
1	Tijuana	0	1	1
3	Cruz Azul Dublán	4	1	5

== See also ==
- Tercera División de México
