= 2011–12 Tercera División de México season =

Tercera División Profesional
- Season: 2011–12
- Dates: 13 August 2011 – 25 May 2012
- Champions: Real Cuautitlán (1st title)
- Promoted: Real Cuautitlán; Calor de San Pedro
- Stats are from the regular season only

The 2011–12 Tercera División season is the fourth-tier football league of Mexico. The tournament began on 13 August 2011 and finished on 25 May 2012.

== Competition format ==
The Tercera División (Third Division) is divided into 14 groups. For the 2009/2010 season, the format of the tournament has been reorganized to a home and away format, which all teams will play in their respective group. The 14 groups consist of teams who are eligible to play in the liguilla de ascenso for one promotion spot, teams who are affiliated with teams in the Liga MX, Ascenso MX and Liga Premier, which are not eligible for promotion but will play that who the better filial team in an eight team filial playoff tournament for the entire season.

The league format allows participating franchises to rent their place to another team, so some clubs compete with a different name than the one registered with the FMF.

== Group 1 ==
Group with 11 teams from Campeche, Chiapas, Quintana Roo, Tabasco and Yucatán.

=== Teams ===
Location of teams in the 2011–12 3ra División Group 1 (Quintana Roo)
Location of teams in the 2011–12 3ra División Group 1 (Campeche City and Yucatán)
Location of teams in the 2011–12 3ra División Group 1 (Carmen (Campeche), Chiapas and Tabasco)

Team	City	Home ground	Capacity	Affiliate	Official name
Atlético Chiapas	Tuxtla Gutiérrez, Chiapas	Víctor Manuel Reyna practice field	2,000	Jaguares de Chiapas	–
Chetumal	Chetumal, Quintana Roo	10 de Abril	5,000	—	—
Corsarios de Campeche	Campeche, Campeche	Universitario de Campeche	4,000	—	—
Delfines de la UNACAR	Ciudad del Carmen, Campeche	Polideportivo UNACAR Campus II	8,000	–	–
Dragones de Tabasco	Villahermosa, Tabasco	Olímpico de Villahermosa	10,500	—	Real Victoria
Ejidatarios de Bonfil	Cancún, Quintana Roo	La Parcela	1,000	—	—
Huracanes de Cozumel	San Miguel de Cozumel, Quintana Roo	Unidad Deportiva Bicentenario	1,000	–	–
Inter Playa del Carmen	Playa del Carmen, Quintana Roo	Unidad Deportiva Luis Donaldo Colosio	1,000	Inter Playa del Carmen	—
Itzaes	Mérida, Yucatán	Unidad Deportiva Solidaridad	1,000	–	–
Jaguares de la 48	Reforma, Chiapas	Sergio Lira Gallardo	600	—	—
Pioneros Junior	Cancún, Quintana Roo	Cancún 86	6,390	Pioneros de Cancún	—

=== League table ===
Pos	Team	Pld	W	D	L	GF	GA	GD	Pts	Qualification or relegation
1	Chetumal	20	16	2	2	56	21	+35	52	Promotion play-offs
2	Atlético Chiapas	20	15	1	4	47	20	+27	47	Promotion play-offs
3	Corsarios de Campeche	20	11	4	5	47	25	+22	39	Promotion play-offs
4	Jaguares de la 48	20	10	5	5	43	25	+18	36	Promotion play-offs
5	Ejidatarios de Bonfil	20	9	6	5	33	27	+6	35	
6	Pioneros Junior	20	6	5	9	24	32	−8	28	
7	Huracanes de Cozumel	20	7	3	10	23	39	−16	26	
8	Dragones de Tabasco	20	5	6	9	26	33	−7	22	
9	Delfines de la UNACAR	20	4	6	10	15	35	−20	22	
10	Itzaes	20	1	7	12	13	36	−23	14	
11	Inter Playa del Carmen	20	1	5	14	6	40	−34	9	

Source: Tercera División

== Group 2 ==
Group with 13 teams from Oaxaca and Veracruz.

=== Teams ===
Location of teams in the 2011–12 3ra División Group 2 (Oaxaca and Southern Veracruz)
Location of teams in the 2011–12 3ra División Group 2 (Northern and Central Veraruz)

Team	City	Home ground	Capacity	Affiliate	Official Name
Académicos UGM	Orizaba, Veracruz	Universitario UGM	1,500	–	–
Atlético Boca del Río	Boca del Río, Veracruz	Unidad Deportiva Hugo Sánchez	1,500	—	–
Caballeros de Córdoba	Córdoba, Veracruz	Rafael Murillo Vidal	3,800	–	–
Cruz Azul Lagunas	Lagunas, Oaxaca	Cruz Azul	2,000	Cruz Azul	–
Delfines UGM	Nogales, Veracruz	UGM Nogales	1,500	—	—
Héroes de Veracruz	Xiutetelco, Puebla	Municipal Xiutetelco	1,000	–	–
Estudiantes de San Andrés	San Andrés Tuxtla, Veracruz	Unidad Deportiva Lino Fararoni	1,000	—	–
Lanceros de Cosoleacaque	Cosoleacaque, Veracruz	Unidad Deportiva Miguel Hidalgo	1,000	–	–
Naranjeros de Álamo	Juchitán de Zaragoza, Oaxaca	Municipal Juchiteco	1,000	–	–
Petroleros de Poza Rica	Poza Rica, Veracruz	Heriberto Jara Corona	10,000	—	—
Piñeros de Loma Bonita	Loma Bonita, Oaxaca	20 de Noviembre	1,000	–	–
Santos Casino	Córdoba, Veracruz	Rafael Murillo Vidal	3,800	Santos Laguna	–
Tiburones Rojos Boca del Río	Boca del Río, Veracruz	CAR Veracruz	1,000	Veracruz	–

=== League table ===
Pos	Team	Pld	W	D	L	GF	GA	GD	Pts	Qualification or relegation
1	Tiburones Rojos Boca del Río	24	19	2	3	77	21	+56	60	Reserve Teams play-offs
2	Santos Casino	24	16	4	4	51	27	+24	53	Promotion play-offs
3	Petroleros de Poza Rica	24	15	4	5	49	24	+25	52	Promotion play-offs
4	Lanceros de Cosoleacaque	24	15	2	7	47	29	+18	48	Promotion play-offs
5	Cruz Azul Lagunas	24	13	4	7	56	29	+27	47	Promotion play-offs
6	Estudiantes de San Andrés	24	13	1	10	37	31	+6	40	
7	Naranjeros de Álamo	24	9	3	12	31	31	0	32	
8	Caballeros de Córdoba	24	9	3	12	39	52	−13	30	
9	Académicos UGM	24	8	4	12	34	31	+3	29	
10	Delfines UGM	24	7	3	14	26	48	−22	26	
11	Piñeros de Loma Bonita	24	5	5	14	28	44	−16	23	
12	Atlético Boca del Río	24	6	1	17	23	50	−27	19	
13	Héroes de Veracruz	24	2	2	20	17	98	−81	9	

Source: Tercera División

== Group 3 ==
Group with 13 teams from Puebla, Tlaxcala and Veracruz.

=== Teams ===
Location of teams in the 2011–12 3ra División Group 3 (Puebla)
Location of teams in the 2011–12 3ra División Group 3 (Tlaxcala)
Location of teams in the 2011–12 3ra División Group 3 (Veracruz)

Team	City	Home ground	Capacity	Affiliate	Official name
Albinegros de Orizaba	Orizaba, Veracruz	EMSA	1,500	–	–
Anlesjeroka	Tehuacán, Puebla	Anlesjeroka	400	Guadalajara	–
Estudiantes de Xalapa	Xalapa, Veracruz	Antonio M. Quirasco	3,000	–	–
Langostineros de Atoyac	Atoyac, Veracruz	Padelma 2000	1,000	–	–
Limoneros de Martínez de la Torre	Martínez de la Torre, Veracruz	El Cañizo	3,000	–	–
Lobos BUAP	Puebla City, Puebla	Preparatoria Benito Juárez	1,500	Lobos BUAP	–
Ocotlán	Atlixco, Puebla	Campo IXTAC	1,000	–	–
Real San Cosme	Mazatecocho, Tlaxcala	San José del Agua	1,000	–	–
Reales de Puebla	Atlixco, Puebla	Deportivo Metepec	1,000	—	—
SEP Puebla	Puebla City, Puebla	Unidad Deportiva Mario Vázquez Raña	800	–	–
Star Club	Chiautempan, Tlaxcala	Unidad Deportiva Próspero Cahuantzi	2,500	—	—
Tehuacán	Tehuacán, Puebla	Tehuacán	1,000	–	–
Tulyehualco	Puebla City, Puebla	Ex Hacienda San José Maravillas	500	–	–

=== League table ===
Pos	Team	Pld	W	D	L	GF	GA	GD	Pts	Qualification or relegation
1	Langostineros de Atoyac	24	20	2	2	63	17	+46	64	Promotion play-offs
2	Tulyehualco	24	15	5	4	75	28	+47	53	Promotion play-offs
3	Albinegros de Orizaba	24	13	5	6	46	23	+23	45	Promotion play-offs
4	Estudiantes de Xalapa	24	11	7	6	34	26	+8	44	Promotion play-offs
5	Ocotlán	24	11	6	7	32	27	+5	41	
6	Star Club	24	11	4	9	36	35	+1	40	
7	Tehuacán	24	9	7	8	39	42	−3	38	
8	Limoneros de Martínez de la Torre	24	10	5	9	32	32	0	36	
9	SEP Puebla	24	6	8	10	30	38	−8	30	
10	Lobos BUAP	24	4	10	10	33	41	−8	27	
11	Anlesjeroka	24	7	5	12	21	38	−17	27	
12	Reales de Puebla	24	1	6	17	14	53	−39	12	
13	Real San Cosme	24	1	4	19	8	63	−55	11	

Source: Tercera División

== Group 4 ==
Group with 13 teams from Guerrero, Mexico City, Morelos and Oaxaca.

=== Teams ===
Location of teams in the 2011–12 3ra División Group 4 (Morelos)
Location of teams in the 2011–12 3ra División Group 4 (Guerrero, Mexico City and Oaxaca)

Team	City	Home ground	Capacity	Affiliate	Official name
Atlético Cuernavaca	Cuernavaca, Morelos	Municipal Mazatepec	1,000	–	–
Ballenas Galeana Morelos	Xochitepec, Morelos	Municipal Mazatepec	1,000	–	–
Chapulineros de Oaxaca	Oaxaca City, Oaxaca	Unidad Deportiva Oriente	1,000	–	–
Chilpancingo	Chilpancingo, Guerrero	Unidad Deportiva Vicente Guerrero	1,000	–	–
Cuautla Yeca Juvenil	Cuautla, Morelos	Isidro Gil Tapia	5,000	Cuautla	–
Deportivo Neza	Xochitepec, Morelos	Mariano Matamoros	16,000	–	–
Frailes Homape	Xochimilco, Mexico City	San Isidro	1,500	–	–
Guerreros de Yecapixtla	Yecapixtla, Morelos	Fidel Díaz Vera	1,000	–	–
Mante	Tezoyuca, Morelos	Tezoyuca	1,000	–	–
Real Olmeca Sport	Iztacalco, Mexico City	Magdalena Mixhuca Sports City	500	–	–
Tigrillos Dorados MRCI	San Jerónimo Tlacochahuaya, Oaxaca	Campo Independiente MRCI	3,000	–	–
Zacatepetl	Zacatepec, Morelos	Agustín Coruco Díaz	16,000	–	–
Zapata	Xochitepec, Morelos	Unidad Deportiva Tehuixtla	1,000	–	–

=== League table ===
Pos	Team	Pld	W	D	L	GF	GA	GD	Pts	Qualification or relegation
1	Zacatepetl	24	15	5	4	69	26	+43	54	Promotion play-offs
2	Tigrillos Dorados MRCI	24	15	3	6	65	35	+30	50	Promotion play-offs
3	Cuautla Yeca Juvenil	24	13	7	4	43	21	+22	50	Promotion play-offs
4	Ballenas Galeana Morelos	24	14	4	6	56	27	+29	48	Promotion play-offs
5	Chilpancingo	24	12	6	6	35	30	+5	45	
6	Mante	24	12	5	7	37	30	+7	43	
7	Guerreros de Yecapixtla	24	8	9	7	29	31	−2	36	
8	Zapata	24	6	9	9	31	37	−6	34	
9	Frailes Homape	24	6	4	14	31	46	−15	23	
10	Chapulineros de Oaxaca	24	7	2	15	35	51	−16	23	
11	Atlético Cuernavaca	24	5	5	14	24	48	−24	23	
12	Real Olmeca Sport	24	4	6	14	15	51	−36	22	
13	Deportivo Neza	24	4	5	15	30	67	−37	17	

Source: Tercera División

== Group 5 ==
Group with 16 teams from Greater Mexico City.

=== Teams ===
Location of teams in the 2011–12 3ra División Group 5 (Greater Mexico City urban area)
Location of teams in the 2011–12 3ra División Group 5 (Greater Mexico City rural area)

Team	City	Home ground	Capacity	Affiliate	Official name
Águilas de Teotihuacán	Teotihuacán, State of Mexico	Municipal Acolman	1,000	–	–
Álamos	Venustiano Carranza, Mexico City	Magdalena Mixhuca Sports City	500	–	–
Azules de la Sección 26	Gustavo A. Madero, Mexico City	Deportivo Francisco Zarco	500	Pachuca	–
Cobijeros de Chiconcuac	Chiconcuac, State of Mexico	Unidad Deportiva San Miguel	1,000	–	–
Coyotes Neza	Ciudad Nezahualcóyotl, State of Mexico	Metropolitano	4,000	–	–
Deportivo Iztacalco	Texcoco de Mora, State of Mexico	San Bernardino	1,000	–	–
Lobos Unión Neza	Ciudad Nezahualcóyotl, State of Mexico	Deportivo Francisco I. Madero	2,000	–	–
Liga Central de Reserves	Venustiano Carranza, Mexico City	Deportivo Plutarco Elías Calles	2,500	–	–
Novillos Neza	Ciudad Nezahualcóyotl, State of Mexico	Metropolitano	4,000	–	–
Pato Baeza	Texcoco de Mora, State of Mexico	Centro de Fútbol Pato Baeza	1,000	–	–
Promodep Central	Venustiano Carranza, Mexico City, Venustiano Carranza	Deportivo Plutarco Elías Calles	2,500	–	–
Sporting Canamy	Iztapalapa, Mexico City	Deportivo Francisco I. Madero	2,000	–	–
Tecamachalco Sur	Huixquilucan de Degollado, State of Mexico	Alberto Pérez Navarro	3,000	–	Ajax Jiutepec
Texcoco	Texcoco de Mora, State of Mexico	Municipal Claudio Suárez	4,000	–	–
Vaqueros	Tepotzotlán, State of Mexico	Municipal Miguel Alemán	1,000	–	–
Venados del Estado de México	Ciudad Nezahualcóyotl, State of Mexico	Neza 86	20,000	–	–

=== League table ===
Pos	Team	Pld	W	D	L	GF	GA	GD	Pts	Qualification or relegation
1	Coyotes Neza	30	24	2	4	85	29	+56	76	Promotion play-offs
2	Cobijeros de Chiconcuac	30	22	4	4	80	23	+57	71	Promotion play-offs
3	Pato Baeza	30	16	8	6	79	31	+48	61	Promotion play-offs
4	Sporting Canamy	30	17	5	8	56	35	+21	59	Promotion play-offs
5	Azules de la Sección 26	30	17	5	8	57	32	+25	58	
6	Liga Central de Reservas	30	14	8	8	60	42	+18	55	
7	Texcoco	30	14	9	7	73	43	+30	53	
8	Lobos Unión Neza	30	16	4	10	51	37	+14	53	
9	Promodep Central	30	13	6	11	53	51	+2	48	
10	Águilas de Teotihuacán	30	11	7	12	49	51	−2	45	
11	Álamos	30	12	4	14	48	44	+4	42	
12	Vaqueros	30	8	6	16	41	59	−18	33	
13	Novillos Neza	30	8	2	20	32	64	−32	27	
14	Tecamachalco Sur	30	5	1	24	26	95	−69	17	
15	Venados del Estado de México	30	2	4	24	29	81	−52	12	
16	Iztacalco	30	2	3	25	22	124	−102	10	

Source: Tercera División

== Group 6 ==
Group with 15 teams from Michoacán and State of Mexico.

Location of teams in the 2011–12 3ra División Group 6

=== Teams ===
Team	City	Home ground	Capacity	Affiliate	Official name
Atlético UEFA	Coacalco, State of Mexico	Campos Fragoso	500	–	–
Buendía	Metepec, State of Mexico	Jesús Lara	1,200	–	–
Estudiantes de Atlacomulco	Atlacomulco, State of Mexico	Ignacio Pichardo Pagaza	2,000	–	–
Grupo Sherwood	Ixtapan de la Sal, State of Mexico	Ixtapan 90	4,000	–	–
Huixquilucan	Huixquilucan de Degollado, State of Mexico	Alberto Pérez Navarro	3,000	–	–
Ixtlahuaca	Ixtlahuaca, State of Mexico	Municipal	2,000	–	–
Jilotepec	Jilotepec, State of Mexico	Rubén Chávez Chávez	2,000	–	–
Lerma	Lerma, State of Mexico	Ixtapan 90	4,000	–	–
Metepec	Metepec, State of Mexico	Jesús Lara	1,200	–	–
Potros UAEM	Toluca, State of Mexico	Alberto "Chivo" Córdoba	32,603	Potros UAEM	–
Real Cuautitlán	Cuautitlán, State of Mexico	Los Pinos	5,000	–	–
Real Halcones	Atizapán de Zaragoza, State of Mexico	Deportivo Ana Gabriela Guevara	2,500	–	–
Tejupilco	Tejupilco, State of Mexico	Unidad Deportiva Tejupilco	1,000	–	–
Tolcayuca	Atlautla, State of Mexico	La Granja	1,500	–	–
Zitácuaro	Zitácuaro, Michoacán	Ignacio López Rayón	10,000	–	–

=== League table ===
Pos	Team	Pld	W	D	L	GF	GA	GD	Pts	Qualification or relegation
1	Tejupilco	28	21	4	3	69	16	+53	71	Promotion play-offs
2	Real Cuautitlán	28	20	3	5	92	17	+75	66	Promotion play-offs
3	Potros UAEM	28	20	4	4	51	14	+37	66	Promotion play-offs
4	Zitácuaro	28	14	11	3	48	23	+25	59	Promotion play-offs
5	Real Halcones	28	16	4	8	60	41	+19	53	
6	Estudiantes de Atlacomulco	28	16	3	9	57	30	+27	52	
7	Lerma	28	14	5	9	44	30	+14	52	
8	Ixtlahuaca	28	13	4	11	49	32	+17	43	
9	Tolcayuca	28	10	4	14	36	50	−14	38	
10	Metepec	28	10	5	13	33	42	−9	35	
11	Jilotepec	28	8	3	17	37	47	−10	28	
12	Buendía	28	4	4	20	19	85	−66	19	
13	Grupo Sherwood	28	3	6	19	22	67	−45	16	
14	Atlético UEFA	28	4	3	21	17	80	−63	16	
15	Huixquilucan	28	4	1	23	34	94	−60	13	

Source: Tercera División

== Group 7 ==
Group with 13 teams from Hidalgo, Puebla, San Luis Potosí and State of Mexico.

=== Teams ===
Location of teams in the 2011–12 3ra División Group 6 (Hidalgo, State of Mexico and SLP)

Team	City	Home ground	Capacity	Affiliate	Official name
Atlético Hidalgo	Pachuca, Hidalgo	La Higa	1,000	–	–
Atlético Huejutla	Huejutla de Reyes, Hidalgo	Carlos Fayad	1,000	–	–
Cruz Azul Dublán	Ciudad Cooperativa Cruz Azul, Hidalgo	Estadio 10 de Diciembre	17,000	Cruz Azul	–
Deportivo Ixmiquilpan	Ixmiquilpan, Hidalgo	Unidad Deportiva Ixmiquilpan	1,000	–	Plateados de Cerro Azul
Hidalguense	Pachuca, Hidalgo	Club Hidalguense	800	–	–
Leones de Huauchinango	Huauchinango, Puebla	Unidad Deportiva México	1,000	–	–
Morelos Ecatepec	Ecatepec, State of Mexico	Morelos	2,000	–	–
Pachuca Juniors	San Agustín Tlaxiaca, Hidalgo	Universidad del Fútbol	1,000	Pachuca	–
Santiago Tulantepec	Santiago Tulantepec, Hidalgo	Unidad Deportiva Conrado Muntane	1,000	–	–
Sultanes de Tamazunchale	Tamazunchale, San Luis Potosí	Deportivo Solidaridad	1,650	—	—
Tuzos Pachuca	San Agustín Tlaxiaca, Hidalgo	Universidad del Fútbol	1,000	Pachuca	–
Unión Acolman	Acolman, State of Mexico	Municipal Acolman	1,200	–	–
Universidad del Fútbol	San Agustín Tlaxiaca, Hidalgo	Universidad del Fútbol	1,000	Pachuca	–

=== League table ===
Pos	Team	Pld	W	D	L	GF	GA	GD	Pts	Qualification or relegation
1	Cruz Azul Dublán	24	19	3	2	96	13	+83	61	Reserve Teams play-offs
2	Santiago Tulantepec	24	19	2	3	62	14	+48	61	Promotion play-offs
3	Hidalguense	24	15	2	7	53	27	+26	49	Promotion play-offs
4	Sultanes de Tamazunchale	24	13	4	7	52	31	+21	46	Promotion play-offs
5	Deportivo Ixmiquilpan	24	12	6	6	43	28	+15	44	Promotion play-offs
6	Leones de Huauchinango	24	11	5	8	35	30	+5	40	
7	Atlético Huejutla	24	10	4	10	41	40	+1	38	
8	Morelos Ecatepec	24	10	4	10	30	35	−5	34	
9	Atlético Hidalgo	24	9	4	11	27	37	−10	32	
10	Universidad del Fútbol	24	4	6	14	31	64	−33	22	
11	Tuzos Pachuca	24	3	6	15	22	62	−40	18	
12	Unión Acolman	24	3	3	18	25	59	−34	13	
13	Pachuca Juniors	24	3	1	20	20	97	−77	10	

Source: Tercera División

== Group 8 ==
Group with 16 teams from Greater Mexico City.

=== Teams ===
Location of teams in the 2011–12 3ra División Group 8 (Greater Mexico City)
Location of teams in the 2011–12 3ra División Group 8 (Greater Mexico City rural area)

Team	City	Home ground	Capacity	Affiliate	Official name
Aztecas AMF Soccer	Naucalpan, State of Mexico	Unidad Deportiva Cuauhtémoc	1,500	–	–
CEFOR Cuauhtémoc Blanco	Venustiano Carranza, Mexico City	Deportivo Plutarco Elías Calles	1,000	–	–
Cielo Azul	Iztapalapa, Mexico City	Deportivo Francisco I. Madero	2,000	–	–
ECA Norte	Naucalpan, State of Mexico	Unidad Deportiva Cuauhtémoc	1,500	–	–
Esmeralda	Atizapan de Zaragoza, State of Mexico	Deportivo Ana Gabriela Guevara	2,500	–	–
Halcones del Valle del Mezquital	Gustavo A. Madero, Mexico City	Deportivo Los Galeana	2,000	–	–
Independiente Mexiquense	Nicolás Romero, State of Mexico	Progreso Industrial	1,500	–	–
Leones de Lomar	Xochimilco, Mexico City	San Isidro	1,200	–	–
Nuevo Chimalhuacán	Chimalhuacán, State of Mexico	La Antorcha	1,500	–	–
Panteras de Lindavista	Gustavo A. Madero, Mexico City	Deportivo Plutarco Elías Calles	1,000	–	–
Plateros	Iztacalco, Mexico City	Jesús Martínez "Palillo"	6,000	–	–
Potros de Hierro	Huixquilucan de Degollado, State of Mexico	Universidad Anáhuac México Norte	300	Atlante	–
San José del Arenal	Chalco, State of Mexico	Joaquín Iracheta	2,000	–	–
Teca Huixquilucan	Texcoco de Mora, State of Mexico	Deportivo San Martín	1,000	Tecamachalco	–
Tecamachalco	Huixquilucan de Degollado, State of Mexico	Alberto Pérez Navarro	3,000	Tecamachalco	–
Vikingos de Chalco	Chalco, State of Mexico	Arreola	2,500	–	–

=== League table ===
Pos	Team	Pld	W	D	L	GF	GA	GD	Pts	Qualification or relegation
1	CEFOR Cuauhtémoc Blanco	30	29	0	1	138	13	+125	87	Promotion play-offs
2	Potros de Hierro	30	25	3	2	100	23	+77	80	Promotion play-offs
3	Tecamachalco	30	25	1	4	123	24	+99	76	Promotion play-offs
4	Independiente Mexiquense	30	19	4	7	67	37	+30	64	Promotion play-offs
5	Cielo Azul	30	20	2	8	71	36	+35	63	
6	Halcones del Valle del Mezquital	30	16	4	10	44	39	+5	55	
7	Esmeralda	30	14	4	12	40	46	−6	48	
8	Nuevo Chimalhuacán	30	14	3	13	63	59	+4	45	
9	Plateros	30	13	4	13	43	47	−4	45	
10	San José del Arenal	30	11	3	16	28	53	−25	37	
11	Leones de Lomar	30	5	9	16	35	72	−37	29	
12	ECA Norte	30	6	6	18	28	60	−32	27	
13	Panteras de Lindavista	30	5	2	23	37	83	−46	18	
14	Vikingos de Chalco	30	4	4	22	34	86	−52	18	
15	Teca Huixquilucan	30	4	2	24	19	88	−69	15	
16	Aztecas AMF Soccer	30	3	3	24	19	123	−104	13	

Source: Tercera División

== Group 9 ==
Group with 16 teams from Guanajuato, Guerrero, Michoacán and Querétaro.

=== Teams ===
Location of teams in the 2011–12 3ra División Group 9 (Guanajuato and Querétaro)
Location of teams in the 2011–12 3ra División Group 9 (Guerrero)
Location of teams in the 2011–12 3ra División Group 9 (Michoacán)

Team	City	Home ground	Capacity	Affiliate	Official name
Atletas Campesinos	Querétaro City, Querétaro	Unidad Deportiva La Cañada	3,000	–	–
Delfines de Abasolo	Abasolo, Guanajuato	Municipal de Abasolo	2,500	–	–
Deportivo Corregidora	Corregidora, Querétaro	Municipal de Querétaro	12,000	–	–
Felinos de Querétaro	Querétaro City, Querétaro	Unidad Deportiva La Cañada	3,000	–	Atlético Iztacalco
Gallos Blancos de Zihuatanejo	Zihuatanejo, Guerrero	Unidad Deportiva Municipal Zihuatanejo	2,000	Querétaro	–
Jaral del Progreso	Jaral del Progreso, Guanajuato	Unidad Deportiva Municipal	1,000	–	–
Limoneros de Apatzingán	Apatzingán, Michoacán	Unidad Deportiva Adolfo López Mateos	5,000	Monarcas Morelia	–
Lobos de Zihuatanejo	Zihuatanejo, Guerrero	Unidad Deportiva Municipal Zihuatanejo	2,000	–	–
Monarcas Morelia	Morelia, Michoacán	Morelos practice field	1,000	Monarcas Morelia	–
Monarcas Zacapu	Zacapu, Michoacán	Municipal de Zacapu	2,500	Monarcas Morelia	–
Originales Aguacateros	Uruapan, Michoacán	Unidad Deportiva Hermanos López Rayón	5,000	–	–
Querétaro	Querétaro, Querétaro	Unidad Deportiva La Cañada	3,000	Querétaro	–
Santa Rosa	Querétaro, Querétaro	Parque Bicentenario	1,000	–	–
Toros de Tequisquiapan	Tequisquiapan, Querétaro	Unidad Deportiva Emiliano Zapata	1,000	–	San Juan del Río
Tota Carbajal	León, Guanajuato	Club Cabezas Rojas	1,000	–	Cabezas Rojas
CDU Uruapan	Uruapan, Michoacán	Unidad Deportiva Hermanos López Rayón	5,000	–	Peces Blancos de Pátzcuaro

=== League table ===
Pos	Team	Pld	W	D	L	GF	GA	GD	Pts	Qualification or relegation
1	Monarcas Morelia	30	26	4	0	113	18	+95	86	Promotion play-offs
2	Limoneros de Apatzingán	30	21	4	5	96	22	+74	69	Promotion play-offs
3	Delfines de Abasolo	30	17	7	6	71	39	+32	61	Promotion play-offs
4	Originales Aguacateros	30	20	0	10	73	41	+32	60	Promotion play-offs
5	Gallos Blancos de Zihuatanejo	30	16	6	8	68	50	+18	58	
6	Querétaro	30	16	7	7	67	55	+12	58	
7	Jaral del Progreso	30	12	4	14	55	75	−20	42	
8	Lobos de Zihuatanejo	30	10	7	13	40	34	+6	41	
9	Tota Carbajal	30	10	6	14	45	68	−23	40	
10	Atletas Campesinos	30	9	8	13	28	46	−18	39	
11	Monarcas Zacapu	30	11	3	16	38	62	−24	38	
12	Toros de Tequisquiapan	30	10	3	17	33	49	−16	34	
13	CDU Uruapan	30	10	3	17	31	47	−16	34	
14	Felinos de Querétaro	30	6	3	21	28	69	−41	24	
15	Santa Rosa	30	5	4	21	29	93	−64	20	
16	Deportivo Corregidora	30	3	7	20	18	65	−47	16	

Source: Tercera División

== Group 10 ==
Group with 17 teams from Aguascalientes, Guanajuato, Jalisco, Michoacán, San Luis Potosí and Zacatecas.

=== Teams ===
Location of teams in the 2011–12 3ra División Group 9 (Guanajuato)
Location of teams in the 2011–12 3ra División Group 10 (Aguascalientes, Jalisco, San Luis Potosí and Zacatecas)
Location of teams in the 2011–12 3ra División Group 10 (Michoacán)

Team	City	Home ground	Capacity	Affiliate	Official name
Atlético Bajío	León, Guanajuato	Unidad Deportiva Enrique Fernández Martínez	1,500	–	–
Atlético ECCA	León, Guanajuato	Lalo Gutiérrez	1,000	–	–
Atlético San Francisco	San Francisco del Rincón, Guanajuato	Domingo Velázquez	3,500	–	–
Atlético San Marcos	Aguascalientes City, Aguascalientes	Ferrocarrilero	1,000	–	–
Cabezas Rojas	León, Guanajuato	Club Cabezas Rojas	1,000	–	–
Cachorros León	León, Guanajuato	Casa Club León	1,000	–	–
Celaya	Celaya, Guanajuato	Miguel Alemán Valdés	23,182	Celaya	–
Colegio Guanajuato	León, Guanajuato	Colegio Guanajuato	1,000	–	–
Deportivo El Milagro	San Juan de los Lagos, Jalisco	Antonio R. Márquez	1,500	–	–
Libertadores de Pénjamo	Pénjamo, Guanajuato	Pablo Herrera	1,500	–	–
Lobos de San Luis	San Luis Potosí City, San Luis Potosí	Centro de Entrenamiento La Presa	1,000	–	–
Mineros de Fresnillo	Fresnillo, Zacatecas	Minera Fresnillo	6,000	–	–
Real Leonés	León, Guanajuato	Club Empress	500	–	–
Real Zamora	Zamora, Michoacán	Unidad Deportiva El Chamizal	5,000	–	–
Reboceritos de La Piedad	La Piedad, Michoacán	Unidad Deportiva Lic. Humberto Romero	1,000	La Piedad	–
Tuzos UAZ	Zacatecas, Zacatecas	Universitario Unidad Deportiva Norte	5,000	Tuzos UAZ	–
Unión León	León, Guanajuato	Lalo Gutiérrez	1,000	–	–

=== League table ===
Pos	Team	Pld	W	D	L	GF	GA	GD	Pts	Qualification or relegation
1	Colegio Guanajuato	32	24	5	3	100	31	+69	79	Promotion play-offs
2	Real Zamora	32	21	5	6	79	29	+50	69	Promotion play-offs
3	Celaya	32	19	7	6	68	27	+41	66	Promotion play-offs
4	Atlético ECCA	32	17	10	5	68	34	+34	66	Promotion play-offs
5	Deportivo El Milagro	32	19	5	8	62	35	+27	66	Promotion play-offs
6	Cachorros León	32	19	5	8	83	33	+50	64	
7	Atlético Bajío	32	17	8	7	65	46	+19	64	
8	Reboceritos de La Piedad	32	18	6	8	70	60	+10	64	
9	Atlético San Francisco	32	18	4	10	69	29	+40	60	
10	Tuzos UAZ	32	14	4	14	46	48	−2	46	
11	Mineros de Fresnillo	32	11	4	17	45	59	−14	41	
12	Atlético San Marcos	32	8	7	17	34	75	−41	36	
13	Unión León	32	9	2	21	39	66	−27	29	
14	Lobos de San Luis	32	4	6	22	38	94	−56	22	
15	Real Leonés	32	5	3	24	23	71	−48	19	
16	Libertadores de Pénjamo	32	5	1	26	22	78	−56	17	
17	Cabezas Rojas	32	2	2	28	24	120	−96	8	

Source: Tercera División

== Group 11 ==
Group with 17 teams from Colima, Jalisco and Michoacán.

=== Teams ===
Location of teams in the 2011–12 3ra División Group 11

Team	City	Home ground	Capacity	Affiliate	Official name
Arandas	Arandas, Jalisco	Unidad Deportiva Gustavo Díaz Ordaz	1,500	–	–
Atlético Cocula	Acatlán, Jalisco	Juan Bigotón Jasso	1,000	–	–
Atlético Tecomán	Tecomán, Colima	Víctor Eduardo Sevilla Torres	2,000	–	–
Atotonilco	Atotonilco El Alto, Jalisco	Unidad Deportiva Margarito Ramírez	1,500	–	–
Charales de Chapala	Chapala, Jalisco	Municipal Juan Rayo	1,000	–	–
Comala Pueblo Mágico	Comala, Colima	Colima	12,000	–	Mérida F.C.
Deportivo Acatic	Acatic, Jalisco	Unidad Deportiva Acatic	1,000	–	–
Deportivo Costalegre	Barra de Navidad, Jalisco	Unidad Deportiva Fidel Kosonoy Celedón	1,000	–	–
Escuela de Fútbol Chivas	Zapopan, Jalisco	Verde Valle	2,000	Guadalajara	–
Nuevos Valores de Occidente	San José de Gracia, Michoacán	Juanito Chávez	1,500	Leones Negros UdeG	–
Oro	Zapopan, Jalisco	Campos Telmex	1,000	Oro	–
Tepatitlán	Tepatitlán, Jalisco	Gregorio "Tepa" Gómez	10,000	–	–
Valle del Grullo	Juanacatlán, Jalisco	Club Juanacatlán	800	–	–
Vaqueros Bellavista	Acatlán, Jalisco	Juan Bigotón Jasso	1,000	–	–
Vaqueros Guadalajara	Tlaquepaque, Jalisco	Club Vaqueros	1,000	–	Búhos de Hermosillo
Volcanes de Colima	Colima City, Colima	Unidad Deportiva Morelos	2,000	–	–
Yurécuaro	Yurécuaro, Michoacán	Unidad Deportiva Centenario	1,000	–	–

=== League table ===
Pos	Team	Pld	W	D	L	GF	GA	GD	Pts	Qualification or relegation
1	Escuela de Fútbol Chivas	32	26	3	3	84	19	+65	83	Reserve Teams play-offs
2	Yurécuaro	32	25	5	2	120	27	+93	80	Promotion play-offs
3	Vaqueros Bellavista	32	23	6	3	76	30	+46	78	Promotion play-offs
4	Atotonilco	32	19	9	4	94	32	+62	72	Promotion play-offs
5	Tepatitlán	32	19	5	8	85	51	+34	65	Promotion play-offs
6	Charales de Chapala	32	17	3	12	58	35	+23	57	Promotion play-offs
7	Deportivo Acatic	32	16	6	10	55	37	+18	57	
8	Deportivo Costalegre	32	12	6	14	63	53	+10	46	
9	Arandas	32	13	4	15	62	77	−15	45	
10	Atlético Tecomán	32	12	6	14	58	55	+3	43	
11	Vaqueros Guadalajara	32	11	8	13	43	44	−1	43	
12	Nuevos Valores de Occidente	32	11	5	16	64	71	−7	41	
13	Atlético Cocula	32	9	9	14	56	69	−13	41	
14	Comala Pueblo Mágico	32	9	5	18	47	69	−22	34	
15	Oro	32	2	5	25	15	90	−75	14	
16	Volcanes de Colima	32	1	3	28	21	138	−117	8	
17	Valle del Grullo	32	1	2	29	10	114	−104	6	

Source: Tercera División

== Group 12 ==
Group with 18 teams from Jalisco, Michoacán and Nayarit.

=== Teams ===
Location of teams in the 2011–12 3ra División Group 12 (Jalisco, Michoacán and Nayarit)

Team	City	Home ground	Capacity	Affiliate	Official name
Atlas	Zapopan, Jalisco	Club Atlas Chapalita	1,000	Atlas	–
Aves Blancas	Tepatitlán, Jalisco	Corredor Industrial	1,200	–	–
Ayotlán	Ayotlán, Jalisco	Chino Rivas	4,000	–	Atlético San Miguel
Cachorros Atotonilco	Zapopan, Jalisco	Club Deportivo La Primavera	3,000	Leones Negros UdeG	–
Cazcanes de Ameca	Ameca, Jalisco	Núcleo Deportivo y de Espectáculos Ameca	4,000	–	–
Cocula	Zapopan, Jalisco	Colegio Once México	3,000	–	–
Deportivo Las Varas	Las Varas, Nayarit	Unidad Deportiva Ejidal	1,500	–	–
Deportivo Los Altos	Yahualica, Jalisco	Las Ánimas	8,500	Deportivo Los Altos	–
Deportivo Nayarit	Tepic, Nayarit	Centro de Desarrollo Marcelino Bernal	1,000	–	–
Deportivo Tomates	Tomatlán, Jalisco	Alejandro Ruelas Ibarra	1,000	–	–
Estudiantes Tecos	Zapopan, Jalisco	Cancha Jorge Campos UAG	1,000	Estudiantes Tecos	–
Guadalajara	Zapopan, Jalisco	Verde Valle	800	Guadalajara	–
Leones Negros UdeG Talpa	Talpa de Allende, Jalisco	Unidad Deportiva Halcón Peña	1,000	Leones Negros UdeG	–
Nacional	Guadalajara, Jalisco	Club Deportivo Occidente	1,000	–	–
Revolucionarios	Zapopan, Jalisco	Colegio Once México	3,000	–	–
Sahuayo	Sahuayo, Michoacán	Unidad Deportiva Municipal	1,500	Sahuayo	–
Vaqueros Nayarit	Tlaquepaque, Jalisco	Club Vaqueros	1,000	–	–
Zapotlanejo	Zapotlanejo, Jalisco	Miguel Hidalgo	1,500	–	–

=== League table ===
Pos	Team	Pld	W	D	L	GF	GA	GD	Pts	Qualification or relegation
1	Cazcanes de Ameca	34	22	8	4	79	23	+56	78	Promotion play-offs
2	Atlas	34	22	8	4	74	33	+41	78	Reserve Teams play-offs
3	Guadalajara	34	21	8	5	73	32	+41	75	Reserve Teams play-offs
4	Estudiantes Tecos	34	21	6	7	69	28	+41	72	Reserve Teams play-offs
5	Zapotlanejo	34	19	6	9	72	54	+18	64	Promotion play-offs
6	Deportivo Nayarit	34	15	11	8	68	49	+19	60	Promotion play-offs
7	Deportivo Tomates	34	14	10	10	58	40	+18	58	Promotion play-offs
8	Deportivo Las Varas	34	13	11	10	60	40	+20	57	Promotion play-offs
9	Aves Blancas	34	15	8	11	56	43	+13	57	
10	Deportivo Los Altos	34	12	9	13	56	54	+2	52	
11	Revolucionarios	34	12	8	14	50	52	−2	47	
12	Cachorros Atotonilco	34	10	11	13	51	55	−4	46	
13	Cocula	34	9	13	12	36	45	−9	45	
14	Vaqueros Nayarit	34	10	7	17	41	53	−12	41	
15	Leones Negros UdeG Talpa	34	7	6	21	31	72	−41	31	
16	Sahuayo	34	8	2	24	37	71	−34	27	
17	Nacional	34	5	4	25	45	109	−64	21	
18	Ayotlán	34	2	2	30	16	119	−103	9	

Source: Tercera División

== Group 13 ==
Group with 17 teams from Coahuila, Nuevo León, San Luis Potosí and Tamaulipas.

=== Teams ===
Location of teams in the 2011–12 3ra División Group 13 (Tamasopo, S.L.P., Tamaulipas and Veracruz)
Location of teams in the 2011–12 3ra División Group 13 (Coahuila, Matehuala, S.L.P and Nuevo León)

Team	City	Home ground	Capacity	Affiliate	Official name
Alianza Unetefan	Guadalupe, Nuevo León	Unidad Deportiva La Talaverna	5,000	–	–
Atlético Altamira	Altamira, Tamaulipas	Lázaro Cárdenas	2,500	–	–
Canteranos Altamira	Altamira, Tamaulipas	Cancha 2 Club Altamira	500	Altamira	–
Correcaminos UAT	Ciudad Victoria, Tamaulipas	Universitario Eugenio Alvizo Porras	5,000	Correcaminos UAT	–
Coyotes de Saltillo	Saltillo, Coahuila	Olímpico Francisco I. Madero	7,000	–	–
Estudiantes Tecnológico de Nuevo Laredo	Nuevo Laredo, Tamaulipas	Olímpico del Tecnológico de Nuevo Laredo	1,200	–	–
Excélsior	General Escobedo, Nuevo León	Centro Deportivo Soriana	2,000	Excélsior	–
Ho Gar Matamoros	Matamoros, Tamaulipas	Pedro Salazar Maldonado	3,000	–	–
Halcones de Saltillo	Saltillo, Coahuila	Olímpico Francisco I. Madero	7,000	–	–
Jaguares de Nuevo León	San Nicolás de los Garza, Nuevo León	Unidad Deportiva Oriente	1,000	–	–
Monterrey	Monterrey, Nuevo León	El Cerrito	1,000	Monterrey	–
Orinegros de Ciudad Madero	Ciudad Madero, Tamaulipas	Olímpico del Tecnológico de Madero	7,000	–	–
Oxitipa Ciudad Valles	Ciudad Valles, San Luis Potosí	Unidad Deportiva de Veteranos	1,000	–	–
Panteras Negras GNL	Guadalupe, Nuevo León	Unidad Deportiva La Talaverna	5,000	–	–
Tigres SD	General Zuazua, Nuevo León	La Cueva de Zuazua	800	Tigres UANL	–
Troyanos UDEM	San Pedro Garza García, Nuevo León	Universidad de Monterrey	1,000	–	–
Tuneros de Matehuala	Matehuala, San Luis Potosí	Manuel Moreno Torres	2,000	–	–

=== League table ===
Pos	Team	Pld	W	D	L	GF	GA	GD	Pts	Qualification or relegation
1	Canteranos Altamira	32	23	3	6	72	22	+50	74	Reserve Teams play-offs
2	Orinegros de Ciudad Madero	32	19	7	6	64	43	+21	67	Promotion play-offs
3	Troyanos UDEM	32	17	7	8	66	34	+32	64	Promotion play-offs
4	Correcaminos UAT	32	18	8	6	55	27	+28	64	
5	Panteras Negras GNL	32	17	7	8	74	44	+30	62	Promotion play-offs
6	Tigres SD	32	14	9	9	61	42	+19	55	
7	Ho Gar Matamoros	32	12	12	8	43	35	+8	54	Promotion play-offs
8	Alianza Unetefan	32	13	10	9	54	57	−3	53	Promotion play-offs
9	Tuneros de Matehuala	32	12	9	11	51	55	−4	52	
10	Jaguares de Nuevo León	32	11	11	10	43	41	+2	49	
11	Halcones de Saltillo	32	12	7	13	38	36	+2	48	
12	Monterrey	32	11	8	13	55	51	+4	44	
13	Excélsior	32	10	6	16	43	52	−9	39	
14	Oxitipa Ciudad Valles	32	8	7	17	35	59	−24	34	
15	Atlético Altamira	32	8	5	19	32	65	−33	30	
16	Coyotes de Saltillo	32	5	2	25	33	80	−47	18	
17	Estudiantes Tecnológico de Nuevo Laredo	32	2	2	28	25	101	−76	9	

Source: Tercera División

== Group 14 ==
Group with 11 teams from Baja California, Sinaloa and Sonora.

=== Teams ===
Location of teams in the 2011–12 3ra División Group 13

Team	City	Home ground	Capacity	Affiliate	Official name
Águilas UAS	Culiacán, Sinaloa	Universitario UAS	3,500	–	–
Azucareros de Los Mochis	Los Mochis, Sinaloa	Centenario	11,134	–	–
Deportivo Guamúchil	Guamúchil, Sinaloa	Coloso del Dique	5,000	Murciélagos	–
Diablos Azules de Guasave	Guasave, Sinaloa	Armando "Kory" Leyson	9,000	–	–
Dorados de Sinaloa	Culiacán, Sinaloa	Unidad Deportiva JAPAC	1,000	Dorados de Sinaloa	–
Guerreros Pericúes	Cabo San Lucas, Baja California Sur	Complejo Deportivo Don Koll	3,500	–	–
Héroes de Caborca	Caborca, Sonora	Fidencio Hernández	3,000	–	–
Indios Cucapá	San Luis Río Colorado, Sonora	México 70	2,000	–	–
Mazatlán	Mazatlán, Sinaloa	Unidad Deportiva SAHOP	1,000	–	–
Poblado Miguel Alemán	Miguel Alemán, Sonora	Alejandro López Caballero	4,000	–	–
Tijuana	Tecate, Baja California	Unidad Deportiva Eufracio Santana	1,000	Tijuana	–

=== League table ===
Pos	Team	Pld	W	D	L	GF	GA	GD	Pts	Qualification or relegation
1	Tijuana	20	9	8	3	46	25	+21	42	Reserve Teams play-offs
2	Diablos Azules de Guasave	20	13	2	5	70	29	+41	41	Promotion play-offs
3	Poblado Miguel Alemán	20	12	3	5	58	38	+20	41	Promotion play-offs
4	Águilas UAS	20	11	5	4	49	28	+21	40	Promotion play-offs
5	Dorados de Sinaloa	20	11	3	6	45	21	+24	38	
6	Mazatlán	20	8	5	7	33	32	+1	30	Promotion play-offs
7	Deportivo Guamúchil	20	8	2	10	36	40	−4	27	
8	Héroes de Caborca	20	5	4	11	23	45	−22	20	
9	Azucareros de Los Mochis	20	5	3	12	21	49	−28	20	
10	Guerreros Pericúes	20	5	3	12	34	74	−40	20	
11	Indios Cucapá	20	3	2	15	17	51	−34	11	

Source: Tercera División

== Group 15 ==
Group with 10 teams from Chihuahua, Coahuila and Durango.

=== Teams ===
Location of teams in the 2011–12 3ra División Group 15

Team	City	Home ground	Capacity	Affiliate	Official name
Aztecas	Gómez Palacio, Durango	Unidad Deportiva Francisco Gómez Palacio	5,000	–	–
Calor de San Pedro	San Pedro, Coahuila	Unidad Deportiva San Pedro	1,000	–	–
Chinarras de Aldama	Aldama, Chihuahua	Ciudad Deportiva Chihuahua	4,000	–	–
Cobras Fútbol Premier	Chihuahua City, Chihuahua	Ciudad Deportiva Chihuahua	4,000	–	–
Colegio de Bachilleres Ciudad Juárez	Ciudad Juárez, Chihuahua	20 de Noviembre	2,500	–	–
Generales de Navojoa	San Pedro, Coahuila	Unidad Deportiva San Pedro	1,000	–	–
Halcones de Jiménez	Jiménez, Chihuahua	Alameda	1,000	–	–
Real Magari	Ciudad Juárez, Chihuahua	20 de Noviembre	2,500	–	–
Soles de Ciudad Juárez	Ciudad Juárez, Chihuahua	20 de Noviembre	2,500	–	–
Toros	Torreón, Coahuila	Club Deportivo Ha Pok	1,000	–	–

=== League table ===
Pos	Team	Pld	W	D	L	GF	GA	GD	Pts	Qualification or relegation
1	Calor de San Pedro	18	16	1	1	50	10	+40	49	Promotion play-offs
2	Soles de Ciudad Juárez	18	12	1	5	42	25	+17	38	Promotion play-offs
3	Colegio de Bachilleres Ciudad Juárez	18	8	3	7	22	22	0	29	Promotion play-offs
4	Toros	18	8	2	8	27	22	+5	27	Promotion play-offs
5	Cobras Fútbol Premier	18	6	5	7	24	22	+2	26	
6	Generales de Navojoa	18	6	4	8	25	22	+3	25	
7	Chinarras de Aldama	18	6	3	9	28	41	−13	22	
8	Aztecas	18	5	3	10	27	34	−7	19	
9	Real Magari	18	6	1	11	18	29	−11	19	
10	Halcones de Jiménez	18	5	1	12	13	49	−36	16	

Source: Tercera División

== Promotion play-offs ==
=== Round of 64 ===
Team 1	Agg.	Team 2	1st leg	2nd leg
Sultanes de Tamazunchale	3–2	Santiago Tulantepec	0–0	3–2
Santos Casino	8–3	Cruz Azul Lagunas	4–3	4–0
Sporting Canamy	2–3	Tejupilco	2–1	0–2
Tulyehualco	4–3	Independiente Mexiquense	1–2	3–1
Chetumal	(p.)5–5 (5-4)	Jaguares de la 48	1–3	4–2
Poza Rica	3–3 (4–5)(p.)	Lanceros de Cosoleacaque	2–1	1–2
Potros de Hierro	7–2	Deportivo Ixmiquilpan	5–2	2–0
Tecamachalco	2–1	Ballenas Galeana Morelos	1–0	1–1
Coyotes Neza	7–3	Pato Baeza	1–0	6–3
Real Cuautitlán	4–1	Cuautla Yeca Juvenil	1–0	3–1
Potros UAEM	1–1 (2–4)(p.)	Tigrillos Dorados MRCI	0–0	1–1
Atlético Chiapas	1–0	Corsarios de Campeche	0–0	1–0
CEFOR Cuauhtémoc Blanco	6–2	Estudiantes de Xalapa	1–1	5–1
Langostineros de Atoyac	4–2	Albinegros de Orizaba	1–1	3–1
Zacatepetl	3–0	Zitácuaro	1–0	2–0
Cobijeros de Chiconcuac	X–X(dnq)	Hidalguense	X–X	X–X
Calor de San Pedro	5–3	Toros	3–1	2–2
Colegio Guanajuato	4–3	Originales Aguacateros	1–2	3–1
Deportivo El Milagro	2–0	Deportivo Las Varas	0–0	2–0
Real Zamora	8–1	Delfines de Abasolo	3–1	5–0
Monarcas Morelia	4–1	Atlético ECCA	2–0	2–1
Diablos Azules de Guasave	1–1 (4–5)(p.)	Mazatlán	0–1	1–0
Poblado Miguel Alemán	6–3	Águilas UAS	2–0	4–3
Cazcanes de Ameca	1–1 (2–3)(p.)	Tepatitlán	0–1	1–0
Soles de Ciudad Juárez	1–2	Colegio de Bachilleres Ciudad Juárez	0–1	1–1
Limoneros de Apatzingán	2–6	Celaya	1–2	1–4
Vaqueros Bellavista	5–1	Deportivo Nayarit	1–0	4–1
Yurécuaro	6–0	Deportivo Tomates	1–0	5–0
Atotonilco	5–3	Zapotlanejo	0–1	5–2
Orinegros de Ciudad Madero	(p.)1–1 (4–1)	Ho Gar Matamoros	0–1	1–0
Troyanos UDEM	1–4	Panteras Negras GNL	0–1	1–3
Charales de Chapala	4–2	Alianza Unetefan	1–2	3–0

=== Round of 32 ===
Team 1	Agg.	Team 2	1st leg	2nd leg
Potros de Hierro	8–2	Lanceros de Cosoleacaque	2–1	6–1
CEFOR Cuauhtémoc Blanco	6–2	Sultanes de Tamazunchale	2–1	4–1
Tejupilco	3–4	Tulyehualco	0–4	3–0
Tecamachalco	1–2	Zacatepetl	1–2	0–0
Cobijeros de Chiconcuac	3–5	Real Cuautitlán	1–2	2–3
Chetumal	3–3 (6–7)(p.)	Santos Casino	0–2	3–1
Coyotes Neza	3–1	Atlético Chiapas	0–1	3–0
Langostineros de Atoyac	7–5	Tigrillos Dorados MRCI	2–3	5–2
Calor de San Pedro	6–0	Colegio de Bachilleres Ciudad Juárez	0–0	6–0
Monarcas Morelia	5–2	Mazatlán	1–1	4–1
Colegio Guanajuato	7–1	Panteras Negras GNL	1–1	6–0
Real Zamora	1–0	Deportivo El Milagro	1–0	0–0
Yurécuaro	6–4	Charales de Chapala	1–3	5–1
Atotonilco	5–5 (9–10)(p.)	Poblado Miguel Alemán	1–4	4–1
Vaqueros Bellavista	4–0	Tepatitlán	2–0	2–0
Orinegros de Ciudad Madero	(p.)1–1 (5–4)	Celaya	1–1	0–0

=== Final stage ===
Round of 16
2N	Calor de San Pedro	1	7	8
7N	Orinegros	4	1	5
4N	Colegio Guanajuato	1	1	2
5N	Vaqueros Bellavista	1	2	3
1N	Monarcas Morelia	1	3	4
8N	Poblado Miguel Alemán	0	1	1
3N	Yurécuaro	0	0	0
6N	Real Zamora	2	2	4
3S	Langostineros de Atoyac	4	1	5
6S	Zacatepetl	0	0	0
1S	CEFOR Cuauhtémoc Blanco	2	1	3(4)
8S	Santos Casino (p.)	3	0	3(5)
4S	Coyotes Neza	1	1	2
5S	Real Cuautitlán	4	2	6
2S	Potros de Hierro	1	3	4
7S	Tulyehualco	3	2	5

Quarter-finals
2N	Calor de San Pedro	0	3	3
6N	Vaqueros Bellavista	0	1	1
1N	Monarcas Morelia	1	0	1(3)
6N	Real Zamora (p.)	0	1	1(4)
3S	Langostineros de Atoyac	2	2	4
8S	Santos Casino	0	2	2
5S	Real Cuautitlán	4	5	9
7S	Tulyehualco	1	0	1

Semi-finals
2N	Calor de San Pedro	0	2	2
6N	Real Zamora	1	0	1
3S	Langostineros de Atoyac	0	0	0(6)
5S	Real Cuautitlán (p.)	0	0	0(7)

Final
2N	Calor de San Pedro	0	1	1
5S	Real Cuautitlán	1	1	2

==== Round of 16 ====
Team 1	Agg.	Team 2	1st leg	2nd leg
Calor de San Pedro	8–5	Orinegros de Ciudad Madero	1–4	7–1
Colegio Guanajuato	2–3	Vaqueros Bellavista	1–1	1–2
Monarcas Morelia	4–1	Poblado Miguel Alemán	1–0	3–1
Yurécuaro	0–4	Real Zamora	0–2	0–2
Langostineros de Atoyac	5–0	Zacatepetl	4–0	1–0
CEFOR Cuauhtémoc Blanco	3–3 (4–5)(p.)	Santos Casino	2–3	1–0
Coyotes Neza	2–6	Real Cuautitlán	1–4	1–2
Potros de Hierro	4–5	Tulyehualco	1–3	3–2

===== First leg =====
2 May 2012	Vaqueros Bellavista	1–1	Colegio Guanajuato	Tlaquepaque, Jalisco
11:00	Gutiérrez 8'	Report	Aranda 37'	Stadium: Club Vaqueros Cancha 1 Attendance: 100; Referee: Edgardo Espejo Tello

2 May 2012	Orinegros de Ciudad Madero	4–1	Calor de San Pedro	Ciudad Madero, Tamaulipas
15:00	Orozco 22'; Montoya 29', 47'; Sánchez 69'	Report	Rodríguez 19'	Stadium: Estadio Olímpico del Tecnológico de Madero; Attendance: 300; Referee: Luis Darién Morán Donías

2 May 2012	Real Cuautitlán	4–1	Coyotes Neza	Cuautitlán, State of Mexico
16:00	Madrid 11'; Rosas 18'; Medina 28'; Ruíz 90'	Report	Calleja 58'	Stadium: Estadio Los Pinos; Attendance: 200; Referee: Carlos Manuel Mata Infante

2 May 2012	Tulyehualco	3–1	Potros de Hierro	Puebla City, Puebla
16:00	Unknown; Padilla 76', 90+1'	Report	Rebollar 34'	Stadium: Ex Hacienda San José Maravillas; Attendance: 150; Referee: Gonzalo Santiago García

2 May 2012	Poblado Miguel Alemán	0–1	Monarcas Morelia	Miguel Alemán, Sonora
19:00		Report	Ortíz 48'	Stadium: Estadio Alejandro López Caballero; Attendance: 2,000; Referee: Eleazar Limón Ochoa

2 May 2012	Santos Casino	3–2	CEFOR Cuauhtémoc Blanco	Córdoba, Veracruz
20:30	Medina 27' (own); Cárdenas 35'; Manzanarez 47'	Report	Vázquez 85'; Carbajal 89'	Stadium: Unidad Deportiva Casino Español; Attendance: 300; Referee: Omar Jaime Hernández

3 May 2012	Zacatepetl	0–4	Langostineros de Atoyac	Zacatepec, Morelos
16:00		Report	Galán 11'; Bautista 54'; Estala 59'; Gutiérrez 87'	Stadium: Estadio Agustín "Coruco" Díaz; Attendance: 1,500; Referee: Michel Ricardo Espinoza Avalos

3 May 2012	Real Zamora	2–0	Yurécuaro	Zamora, Michoacán
20:00	Magaña 18'; Barragán 63'	Report		Stadium: Unidad Deportiva El Chamizal; Attendance: 2,000; Referee: Luis Alberto Vazquez Pineda

===== Second leg =====
5 May 2012	Monarcas Morelia	3–1 (4–1 agg.)	Poblado Miguel Alemán	Morelia, Michoacán
12:00	Piñón 28'; Escudero 52'; Meza 90+3'	Report	Silva 54'	Stadium: Morelos practice field Attendance: 60; Referee: Marco Antonio Bisguerra Mendiola

5 May 2012	Calor de San Pedro	7–1 (8–5 agg.)	Orinegros de Ciudad Madero	San Pedro, Coahuila
13:30	Flores 7', 49', 78', 90+1'; Rodríguez 14'; Machado 39'; Ponce 86'	Report	Sánchez 3'	Stadium: Unidad Deportiva San Pedro; Attendance: 250; Referee: Víctor Alfonso Chávez Cruz

5 May 2012	Coyotes Neza	1–2 (2–6 agg.)	Real Cuautitlán	Ciudad Nezahualcóyotl, State of Mexico
14:00	González 58' (own)	Report	Medina 38'; Hernández 77'	Stadium: Estadio Metropolitano; Attendance: 500; Referee: Jorge Adan Tonix Vázquez

5 May 2012	Colegio Guanajuato	1–2 (2–3 agg.)	Vaqueros Bellavista	Purísima del Rincón, Guanajuato
15:00	González 81'	Report	Ramos 24', 35'	Stadium: Colegio Guanajuato; Attendance: 500; Referee: Jovanni Gabriel Zuñiga Martinez

5 May 2012	CEFOR Cuauhtémoc Blanco	1–0 (3–3 agg.) (4–5 p)	Santos Casino	Mexico City
16:00	Vega 70'	Report		Stadium: Deportivo Plutarco Elías Calles; Attendance: 300; Referee: Alejandro Funk Villafañe

5 May 2012	Potros de Hierro	3–2 (4–5 agg.)	Tulyehualco	Huixquilucan de Degollado, State of Mexico
19:00	Miranda 73'; De la Torre 85'; Cid 86'	Report	Carrasco 46'; Hernández 79'	Stadium: Universidad Anáhuac México Norte; Attendance: 200; Referee: Christian Adrián Ramírez Tejeda

6 May 2012	Langostineros de Atoyac	1–0 (5–0 agg.)	Zacatepetl	Atoyac, Veracruz
14:00	Bautista 5'	Report		Stadium: Campo de la Sección 23; Attendance: 1,000; Referee: Victor Manuel Monroy Hernández

6 May 2012	Yurécuaro	0–2 (0–4 agg.)	Real Zamora	Yurécuaro, Michoacán
16:00		Report	Espinoza 45'; Franco 59'	Stadium: Unidad Deportiva Centenario; Attendance: 1,500; Referee: Aldo Cano Martínez

==== Quarter-finals ====
Team 1	Agg.	Team 2	1st leg	2nd leg
Calor de San Pedro	3–1	Vaqueros Bellavista	0–0	3–1
Monarcas Morelia	1–1 (3–4)(p.)	Real Zamora	1–0	0–1
Langostineros de Atoyac	4–2	Santos Casino	2–0	2–2
Real Cuautitlán	9–1	Tulyehualco	4–1	5–0

===== First leg =====
9 May 2011	Vaqueros Bellavista	0–0	Calor de San Pedro	Tlaquepaque, Jalisco
12:00		Report		Stadium: Club Vaqueros Cancha 1 Attendance: 100; Referee: Jonatan Mercado Figueroa

9 May 2012	Tulyehualco	1–4	Real Cuautitlán	Puebla City, Puebla
16:00	Carrasco 45'	Report	Ruíz 13'; Moncada 22' de la Cruz 90+2', 90+3'	Stadium: Ex Hacienda San José Maravillas; Attendance: 200; Referee: Carlos Manuel Mata Infante

9 May 2012	Real Zamora	0–1	Monarcas Morelia	Zamora, Michoacán
20:00		Report	Barrera 42'	Stadium: Unidad Deportiva El Chamizal; Attendance: 2,000; Referee: Christian Adrián Ramírez Tejeda

10 May 2012	Santos Casino	0–2	Langostineros de Atoyac	Córdoba, Veracruz
18:30		Report	Ortíz 18'; López 19'	Stadium: Unidad Deportiva Casino Español; Attendance: 1,100; Referee: Michel Ricardo Espinoza Avalos

===== Second leg =====
12 May 2012	Monarcas Morelia	0–1 (1–1 agg.) (3–4 p)	Real Zamora	Morelia, Michoacán
12:00		Report	Franco 10'	Stadium: Morelos practice field Attendance: 300; Referee: Isaac Javier Farias Moreno

12 May 2012	Calor de San Pedro	3–1 (3–1 agg.)	Vaqueros Bellavista	San Pedro, Coahuila
13:30	Flores 28', 36'; Martínez 77'	Report	Mejía 42'	Stadium: Unidad Deportiva San Pedro; Attendance: 300; Referee: Alejandro Funk Villafañe

12 May 2012	Real Cuautitlán	5–0 (9–1 agg.)	Tulyehualco	Cuautitlán, State of Mexico
16:00	Madrid 3', 50', 69' de la Cruz 73'; Rosas 83'	Report		Stadium: Estadio Los Pinos; Attendance: 300; Referee: Omar Jaime Hernández

13 May 2012	Langostineros de Atoyac	2–2 (4–2 agg.)	Santos Casino	Atoyac, Veracruz
14:00	Olguín 23'; López 44'	Report	Sandoval 20'; Cárdenas 76'	Stadium: Campo de la Sección 23; Attendance: 2,500; Referee: Jovanni Gabriel Zuñiga Martinez

==== Semi-finals ====
Team 1	Agg.	Team 2	1st leg	2nd leg
Calor de San Pedro	2–1	Real Zamora	0–1	2–0
Langostineros de Atoyac	0–0 (6–7)(p.)	Real Cuautitlán	0–0	0–0

===== First leg =====
16 May 2012	Real Zamora	1–0	Calor de San Pedro	Zamora, Michoacán
20:00	Zarate 69'	Report		Stadium: Unidad Deportiva El Chamizal; Attendance: 3,000; Referee: Michel Ricardo Espinoza Ávalos

17 May 2012	Real Cuautitlán	0–0	Langostineros de Atoyac	Cuautitlán, State of Mexico
16:00		Report		Stadium: Estadio Los Pinos; Attendance: 2,000; Referee: Edgardo Espejo Tello

===== Second leg =====
19 May 2012	Calor de San Pedro	2–0 (2–1 agg.)	Real Zamora	San Pedro, Coahuila
13:30	Lozoya 36'; Terrazas 85'	Report		Stadium: Unidad Deportiva San Pedro; Attendance: 500; Referee: Mario Humberto Vargas Mata

20 May 2012	Langostineros de Atoyac	0–0 (0–0 agg.) (6–7 p)	Real Cuautitlán	Atoyac, Veracruz
14:00		Report		Stadium: Campo de la Sección 23; Attendance: 3,500; Referee: Jovanni Gabriel Zuñiga Martinez

==== Final ====
Team 1	Agg.	Team 2	1st leg	2nd leg
Calor de San Pedro	1–2	Real Cuautitlán	0–1	1–1

===== First leg =====
23 May 2012	Real Cuautitlán	1–0	Calor de San Pedro	Cuautitlán, State of Mexico
16:00	Bernal 65' (own)	Report		Stadium: Estadio Los Pinos; Attendance: 800; Referee: Eduardo Alberto Vázquez Aguilar

===== Second leg =====
26 May 2012	Calor de San Pedro	1–1 (1–2 agg.)	Real Cuautitlán	San Pedro, Coahuila
13:30	Reyes 90+3'	Report	Hernández 80'	Stadium: Unidad Deportiva San Pedro; Attendance: 1,000; Referee: Mario Humberto Vargas Mata

2011–12 winners

1st title

== Reserve teams play–offs ==
Quarter-finals
1	Escuela de Fútbol Chivas	1	1	2
8	Tijuana	1	0	1
3	Tiburones Rojos Boca del Río	2	1	3
6	Guadalajara	4	1	5
2	Cruz Azul Dublán	1	2	3
7	Estudiantes Tecos	1	1	2
4	Canteranos Altamira	0	2	2
5	Atlas	2	1	3

Semi-finals
1	Escuela de Fútbol Chivas	2	0	2
6	Guadalajara	1	2	3
2	Cruz Azul Dublán	0	1	1
5	Atlas	1	1	2

Final
6	Guadalajara	2	2	4
5	Atlas	3	0	3

== See also ==
- Tercera División de México
