= Tecamachalco =

Tecamachalco may refer to:

== Places ==
- Tecamachalco, Puebla
- Tecamachalco, State of Mexico, a neighborhood in suburban Greater Mexico City

== Sports ==
- Tecamachalco, Mexican football club
- Teca Huixquilucan, Mexican football club
