= Estadio Samuel León Brindis =

American football stadium in Tuxtla Gutierrez, Mexico

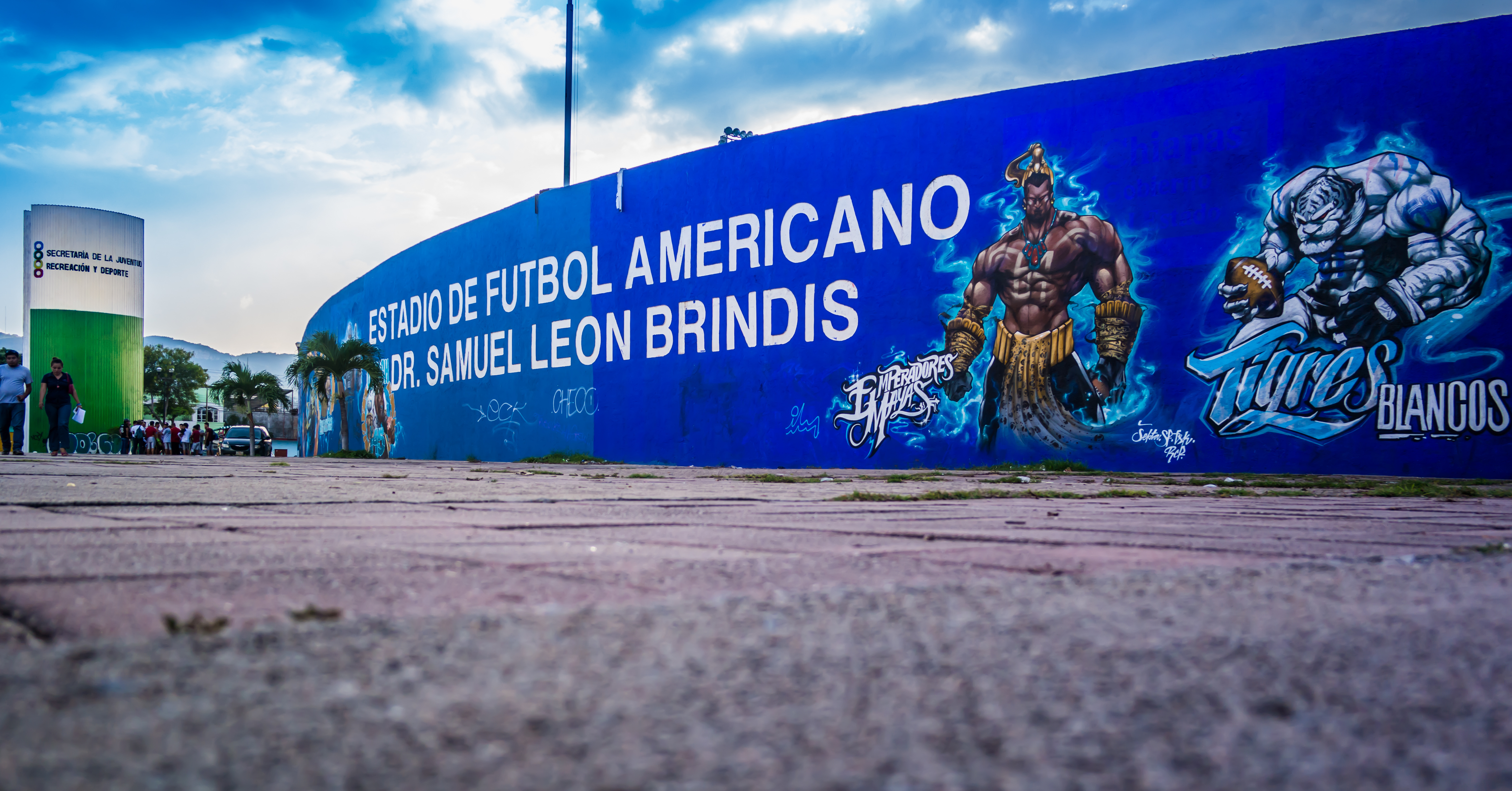
- Interactive map of Estadio Samuel León Brindis
- Location: Tuxtla Gutiérrez, Chiapas, Mexico
- Coordinates: 16.74847°N 93.10102°W
- Owner: State of Chiapas Government
- Capacity: 4,000
- Surface: Artificial turf

Construction
- Cost: $17,000,000 Mexican pesos

Tenant
- Bengalies UNIB (2004–present)

The Estadio Samuel León Brindis is a stadium in Tuxtla Gutiérrez, Chiapas, Mexico, used primarily for American football.
