= Deportivo Maya Caribe =

Mexican football club

- Full name: Deportivo Maya Caribe F.C
- Nickname: Mayas
- Ground: Campo 2, Ciudad del Carmen, Mexico
- Chairman: Mario Alberto Baena
- Manager: Enrique Lobato Reynoso
- League: Tercera División de México
Home colours	Away colours

Ciudad del Carmen, Mexico is a Mexican football club that plays in the Tercera División de México. The club is based in Ciudad del Carmen, Mexico .

== See also ==
- Football in Mexico
