= Éder Guerrero =

American soccer player (born 1992)

Personal information
- Full name: Éder Guerrero Murillo
- Date of birth: March 25, 1992 (age 34)
- Place of birth: San Bernardino, California, United States
- Height: 1.76 m (5 ft 9 in)
- Position: Midfielder

Team information
- Current team: Los Angeles Force
- Number: 22

Youth career
- 2007–2013: Morelia

Senior career*
Years	Team	Apps	(Gls)
2013–2018	Morelia	12	(0)
2014	→ Atlético San Luis (loan)	5	(0)
2014	→ Tecamachalco (loan)	2	(0)
2015	→ Toros Neza (loan)	12	(1)
2015–2016	→ U. de C. (loan)	19	(2)
2017	→ Atlético Estado de México (loan)	8	(0)
2020	Furia Roja		
2021	La Piedad	7	(3)
2022–	Los Angeles Force	2	(0)
- * Club domestic league appearances and goals as of April 16, 2022

Éder Guerrero Murillo (born March 25, 1992), known as Éder Guerrero, is an American professional soccer player who currently plays for Los Angeles Force in the National Independent Soccer Association.
