= C.F. Lanzamex Atlixco =

Mexican football club

Lanzamex Atlixco
- Full name: C.F. Lanzamex Atlixco
- Nickname: Lanzamex
- Founded: 2009
- Ground: Estadio El Potrero, Atlixco, Puebla
- Capacity: 1,000
- Chairman: Enique Garcia Santamarina
- Manager: Octavio Álvarez
- League: Tercera División de México
Home colours	Away colours

Lanzamex Atlixco is a Mexican football club that plays in the Tercera División de México. The club is based in Atlixco, Puebla, and was founded in 2009.

== See also ==
- Football in Mexico
- Tercera División de México
