= Héroes de Caborca =

- Full name: Club Deportivo Héroes de Caborca
- Founded: 2004
- Dissolved: 2019
- Ground: Estadio Fidencio Hernández, Caborca, Sonora
- Capacity: 3,000
- Manager: José Cañez
- League: Tercera División de México
Home colours	Away colours

Club Deportivo Héroes de Caborca was a Mexican football club that plays in the Tercera División de México. The club is based in Caborca, Sonora and was founded in 2004.

== Honours ==
- Tercera División de México (1): 2009–10

== See also ==
- Football in Mexico
- Tercera División de México
