= Estudiantes Tecnológico de Nuevo Laredo =

- Founded: 2010
- Ground: Estadio Olimpico del Tecnologico; Nuevo Laredo, Mexico
- Capacity: 1,200
- Chairman: (Mexico) Roberto Huerta Cano
- Manager: (Mexico) Andres Villalon Rubio
- League: Tercera División - Group XII
- 2014: 14
Home colours	Away colours

Estudiantes Tecnológico de Nuevo Laredo is a football (soccer) club from Nuevo Laredo, Tamaulipas, Mexico. They play in the Tercera División de México of the Federación Mexicana de Fútbol Asociación. The team plays its home matches in Estadio Olimpico del Tecnologico of Nuevo Laredo. The team is owned by the university Tecnológico de Nuevo Laredo.
