= Deportivo Anlesjeroka =

- Full name: Deportivo Anlesjeroka F.C
- Nickname: Anlesjeroka
- Founded: 2006
- Ground: Estadio Tehuacán, Tehuacan, Puebla
- Capacity: 1,000
- Chairman: Octavio Alvarez Lopes
- Manager: José Antonio Sánchez
- League: Tercera División de México
Home colours	Away colours	Third colours

Deportivo Anlesjeroka is a Mexican football club that plays in the Tercera División de México. The club is based in Tehuacán, Puebla, and was founded as Chivas Anlesjeroka in 2006.

== History ==
The club was founded in 2006 in Tehuacán, Puebla, been part of C.D. Guadalajara inferior youth system. In 2007-2008 the club won back to back Torneo de Apertura 2008 en la segunda fuerza which is a regional tournament in Tehuacan, Puebla. The club recently plays in group 3 of the Tercera División de México.

== See also ==
- Football in Mexico
- Tehuacan
- Puebla

== Honors ==
- Torneo de Apertura 2008 en la segunda fuerza:(2) 2007,2008
