= Naranjeros de Álamo =

- Full name: Naranjeros de Álamo
- Nickname: The Orange Ones
- Founded: 1991
- Ground: Estadio Municipal Juchiteco, Alamo Tempache, Veracruz
- Chairman: Jose Maria Duran Francisco
- Manager: Felipe Guzmán Gorgonio
- League: Tercera División de México
Home colours	Away colours

Naranjeros de Álamo is a Mexican football club that plays in group 2 in the Tercera División de México. The club is based in Alamo Tempache, Veracruz . Among its best moments as an institution was in the 2009-2010 season in the Tercera Division de Mexico when at the hands of coach Felipe Guzman Gorgonio they reached the highest instance of the quarterfinals where their misfortune was at the hands of the Club Santos Cordoba. However, they achieved a great season, the best in the club's history by spinning 12 consecutive victories, having a great style of play.

== See also ==
- Football in Mexico
