= Héroes de Veracruz =

- Full name: Héroes de Veracruz Fútbol Club
- Nickname(s): Los Héroes (The Heroes)
- Founded: 2009
- Ground: Centro Estatal del Deporte Mario Vázquez Raña, Puebla City, Puebla
- Capacity: 800
- Chairman: Juan Pablo Ruiz
- Manager: Alberto Vázquez
- League: Tercera División de México
Home colours	Away colours	Third colours

Héroes de Veracruz is a Mexican football club that plays in the Tercera División de México. The club is based in Puebla City, Puebla and was founded in 2010.

== See also ==
- Football in Mexico
- Veracruz
- Tercera División de México
