= Guerreros Zacapu =

Mexican football club

- Full name: Centro de Formación Guerreros Zacapu
- Nickname: Los Monarcas (The Monarchs)
- Founded: 13 October 2005; 20 years ago
- Ground: Estadio Municipal de Zacapu; Zacapu, Michoacán, Mexico
- Capacity: 2,500
- Chairman: José Alfredo Pérez Ferrer
- Manager: Luis Rodríguez
- League: Tercera División de México - Group VIII
- 2020–21: 14th – Group VIII
Home colours	Away colours

Guerreros Zacapu, is a professional Mexican football club. They currently play in the Group VIII of the Tercera División de México. The team is reborn in May 2015 in the Segunda División de México as Monarcas Zacapu, a filial team of Monarcas Morelia. In 2016 the team was rebranded as Guerreros Zacapu, however, they maintained the original name in the FMF register. In 2019, the team was paused and their register was rented to a new team called Chocos de Tabasco. For 2020, the team returns to Zacapu.
