= Huracanes de Cozumel =

- Full name: Club Huracanes de Cozumel
- Nickname(s): Huracanes(Hurricanes)
- Ground: Unidad Deportiva Bicentenario, Cozumel, Mexico
- Chairman: Manuel Marrufo
- Manager: Tomas Bahen
- League: Tercera División de México
Home colours	Away colours

Huracanes de Cozumel is a Mexican football club that plays in the Tercera División de México. The club is based in Cozumel, Mexico.

== See also ==
- Football in Mexico
