= Deportivo Iztacalco =

Football club in Mexico

Los Valedores de Iztacalco
- Full name: Deportivo Iztacalco, AC
- Nickname: Los Valedores (The Defenders)
- Founded: August 20, 2007
- Ground: Estadio San Bernardino, Texcoco, Edo. Mexico
- Capacity: 10,000
- Chairman: Ángel Morales "El Magnate"
- Manager: Vicente "Lavolpin" Jiménez
- League: Tercera Division
Home colours	Away colours

Deportivo Iztacalco, nicknamed Los Valedores is a Mexican football club. They currently play in the Group V of the México Tercera División (Last or third division). In the 2006–2007 season they inherited the spot from Club Santa Cruz, the latter the team with the least successful Tercera División record in the 2007 Liga de Ascenso Clausura tournament (zero points in 15 matches and a -40 difference in the number of goals scored and received).

== History ==
Most of the players come from Club San Andres, team which won a spot to play in the Tercera División after winning an amateur championship supported by the Federacíón Méxicana de Futbol (Méxican Football Federation Association) and organized by Ángel Morales, owner of several Tercera División franchises.

Deportivo Iztacalco acquired the nickname "Los Valedores" during the 2007 Apertura tournament, when TV Azteca dedicated a space for the first time in its evening program Los Protagonistas, presenting it as the worst team in the Tercera División and whose direction was under TV Azteca's reporter Barak Fever.

Although their training camps are located in Iztacalco, Mexico City, Los Valedores de Iztacalco dispute their local matches at Estadio San Bernardino, known as "El Muro de los Sueños" ("The Wall of Dreams"), located in the town of San Bernardino, in the municipality of Texcoco, Mexico State.

Thanks to their constant appearances on TV Azteca, the team has generated a large national television following with the distinction of being the most known team from Tercera División.

=== First Season ===
For the Apertura 2007 and Clausura 2008 tournaments, the Mexican Football Federation placed Deportivo Iztacalco in Group VII of the Tercera División. Los Valedores lost their first seven games. On September 26, 2007, gained their first point in the Round 8 after 1–1 tie against Mineros del Real Hidalgo, despite having lost later in the penalty kicks.

October 12, 2007 is the date of what many consider their greatest achievement, their first victory. In the 12th week of the tournament, the referee gave them a default win when the opposing team failed to make an appearance on the pitch.

The Deportivo Iztacalco ended the 2007 Apertura tournament with 4 points, the result of "winning" their first competitive match, a draw and 12 losses. Los Valedores ended in the last position of Group VII and in the general position 202 among 204 clubs that make the Tercera División.

On December 11, 2007 Los Valedores had a match against a representative team from Los Protagonistas, which was the program on "TV Azteca" that broadcast the Valedores games on Television, this team was formed by former professional players like Luis Garcia, Jorge Campos, Francisco Gabriel de Anda, Roberto Medina and Careca. The match was held at the Deportivo Xochimilco Stadium with controversial refereeing from Gilberto Alcala. The match ended 1–0 in favour of the Los Protagonistas team.

== 2007 Tryouts ==
At the end of the 2007 Apertura season, the team conducted tryouts where more than 700 candidates attended. Only 5 were selected: Diego "El Gato" Reynoso (goalkeeper), Guillermo "RBD" Guzmán (defender), Carlos "Piwi" Godínez and Anibal "Robinho" Cruz (midfielder) and Giovanni "Guardadito" Pérez (striker).

== 2008-2009 ==
During the 2008 League Season, Valedores conducted a second tryout where more than 3000 candidates attended. Nine players were selected (Check out 2008 League squad changes). The director of football operations changed more than half of the team roster based on the poor performance reflected in the past seasons. At the present time, Valedores have 36 points (25 more than Apertura 2007) and still have more than 10 remaining matches to play.

The Deportivo Iztacalco has a rival in Atlético Xochimilco, the latter a team that acquired some of the players that were laid off by "Valedores". In 2008, they had their first match, 2–1 in favour of "Valedores".

After another successful National Tour, TV Azteca decided to terminate the Valedores de Iztacalco project. This made a few of the "Valedores" players leave the team.
