= Los Olivos LMT =

Mexican football club

- Full name: Los Olivos LMT
- Nickname(s): Los Limoneros
- Founded: 2008; 17 years ago
- Ground: Los Olivos; Puebla City, Puebla, Mexico
- Capacity: 1,000
- Owner: Jorge Luis Mendoza Velarde
- Chairman: Jesús Jiménez Alejo
- Manager: Rogelio Martínez
- League: Tercera División de México - Group II
- Apertura 2017: Preseason
Home colours	Away colours

Club Limoneros de Fútbol is a Mexican football club that plays in the Tercera División de México. The club is based in Martínez de la Torre, Veracruz. Top Scorer Club : Ronaldo Aldair Trinidad Herrera 88 Goals Season 2013-2014 - 2014- 2015

== See also ==
- Football in Mexico
- Veracruz
- Tercera División de México
