= Plateados de Cerro Azul =

Mexican football club

- Full name: Club Plateados de Cerro Azul
- Nickname(s): Los Azules
- Ground: Deportivo Bancario; Guadalupe, Nuevo León, Mexico
- Capacity: 1,000
- Chairman: Jesús Ernesto Velarde
- Manager: Mario Franco
- League: Tercera División de México - Group X
- Apertura 2017: Preseason
Home colours	Away colours	Third colours

Plateados de Cerro Azul is a Mexican football club that plays in the Tercera División de México. The club is based in Nuevo León.

== See also ==
- Football in Mexico
- Tercera División de México
