= Vaqueros F.C. =

Vaqueros
- Full name: Vaqueros Fútbol Club
- Nickname: Los Vaqueros (The Cowboys)
- Founded: 2004; 22 years ago
- Ground: Club Vaqueros Ixtlán; Guadalajara, Jalisco
- Capacity: 1,500
- Chairman: Antonio Ibarra López
- Manager: Humberto Romero
- League: Tercera División de México - Group XI
- Apertura 2017: Preseason
Home colours	Away colours

Vaqueros Fútbol Club is a Mexican football club that plays in the Tercera División de México. The club is based in Guadalajara, Jalisco.

== See also ==
- Football in Mexico
