= Teca Huixquilucan =

- Full name: Teca Huixquilucan
- Founded: 3 March 2014; 11 years ago
- Dissolved: 2017; 8 years ago
- Ground: Unidad Deportiva No. 8 Cuauhtémoc; Guadalajara, Jalisco, Mexico
- Capacity: 1,000
- Owner: Grupo Tecamachalco
- Chairman: Santiago San Román
- League: Tercera División
- 2015–16: Begins August
Home colours	Away colours

Teca Huixquilucan was Mexican football club that played in the Tercera División de México. The club was based in Guadalajara, Jalisco.

== See also ==
- Football in Mexico
