= 2015–16 Tercera División de México season =

Tercera División Profesional
- Season: 2015–16
- Dates: 21 August 2015 – 11 June 2016
- Champions: Leones Negros UdeG "C" (1st title)
- Promoted: Leones Negros UdeG "C"; Jiquipilas Valle Verde
- Stats are from the regular season only

The 2015–16 Tercera División season is the fourth-tier football league of Mexico. The tournament began on 21 August 2015 and finished on 11 June 2016.

== Competition format ==
The Tercera División (Third Division) is divided into 14 groups. For the 2009/2010 season, the format of the tournament has been reorganized to a home and away format, which all teams will play in their respective group. The 14 groups consist of teams who are eligible to play in the liguilla de ascenso for one promotion spot, teams who are affiliated with teams in the Liga MX, Ascenso MX and Liga Premier, which are not eligible for promotion but will play that who the better filial team in an eight team filial playoff tournament for the entire season.

The league format allows participating franchises to rent their place to another team, so some clubs compete with a different name than the one registered with the FMF.

== Group 1 ==
Group with 11 teams from Campeche, Chiapas, Quintana Roo and Yucatán.

Location of teams in the 2015–16 3ra División Group 1 (Chiapas)
Location of teams in the 2015–16 3ra División Group 1 (Quintana Roo)
Location of teams in the 2015–16 3ra División Group 1 (Campeche and Yucatán)

=== Teams ===
Team	City	Home ground	Capacity	Affiliate
Campeche	Campeche, Campeche	La Muralla de Kin-Ha	500	—
Cantera Venados	Mérida, Yucatán	Carlos Iturralde	15,087	Venados
Chetumal	Chetumal, Quintana Roo	10 de Abril	5,000	—
Corsarios de Campeche	Campeche, Campeche	Universitario de Campeche	4,000	—
Deportiva Venados	Tamanché, Yucatán	Alonso Diego Molina	2,500	—
Ejidatarios de Bonfil	Cancún, Quintana Roo	Sindicato de Taxistas	1,000	–
Héroes de Zaci	Valladolid, Yucatán	Unidad Deportiva Claudio Alcocer	1,000	–
Inter Playa del Carmen	Playa del Carmen, Quintana Roo	Unidad Deportiva Félix González Canto	1,000	Inter Playa del Carmen
Jaguares de la 48	Reforma, Chiapas	Sergio Lira Gallardo	600	—
Pioneros Junior	Cancún, Quintana Roo	Cancún 86	6,390	Pioneros de Cancún
Yalmakán	Puerto Morelos, Quintana Roo	Unidad Deportiva Colonia Pescadores	1,200	Yalmakán

=== League table ===
Pos	Team	Pld	W	D	L	GF	GA	GD	BP	Pts	Qualification or relegation
1	Corsarios de Campeche	20	13	5	2	34	12	+22	0	44	Promotion play-offs
2	Deportiva Venados	20	13	3	4	30	15	+15	2	44	Promotion play-offs
3	Campeche	20	11	5	4	35	20	+15	4	42	Promotion play-offs
4	Yalmakán	20	12	2	6	36	14	+22	2	40	Promotion play-offs
5	Cantera Venados	20	8	4	8	30	27	+3	3	31	
6	Chetumal	20	9	3	8	27	32	−5	1	31	
7	Pioneros Junior	20	7	6	7	26	24	+2	2	29	
8	Ejidatarios de Bonfil	20	6	5	9	35	33	+2	1	24	
9	Inter Playa del Carmen	20	3	5	12	21	41	−20	5	19	
10	Héroes de Zaci	20	3	5	12	15	36	−21	3	17	
11	Jaguares de la 48	20	2	3	15	13	48	−35	1	10	

Source: Tercera División FMF

== Group 2 ==
Group with 15 teams from Chiapas, Oaxaca, Tabasco and Veracruz.

=== Teams ===
Location of teams in the 2015–16 3ra División Group 3 (Oaxaca, Southern Veracruz and Western Chiapas)
Location of teams in the 2016–17 3ra División Group 2 (Chiapas, Tabasco and Northern and Central Veraruz)

Team	City	Home ground	Capacity	Affiliate	Official Name
Atlético Acayucan	Acayucan, Veracruz	Unidad Deportiva Vicente Obregón	1,000	—	—
Atlético Boca del Río	Boca del Río, Veracruz	Unidad Deportiva Hugo Sánchez	2,500	—	–
Atlético Ixtepec	Ixtepec, Oaxaca	Brena Torres	1,000	—	–
Brujos de los Tuxtlas	San Andrés Tuxtla, Veracruz	Unidad Deportiva Lino Fararoni	1,000	—	Atlante Tabasco
Búhos de Xalapa	Xalapa, Veracruz	Escuela Artículo 3º Constitucional	500	–	–
Cafetaleros de Xalapa	Xalapa, Veracruz	Antonio M. Quirasco	3,000	–	Ciudad Valles
Cruz Azul Lagunas	Lagunas, Oaxaca	Cruz Azul	2,000	Cruz Azul	–
Delfines UGM	Nogales, Veracruz	UGM Nogales	1,500	—	—
Dragones de Tabasco	Villahermosa, Tabasco	Olímpico de Villahermosa	12,000	—	Real Victoria
Halcones Marinos de Veracruz	Boca del Río, Veracruz	Unidad Deportiva Hugo Sánchez	1,500	—	–
Jiquipilas Valle Verde	Jiquipilas, Chiapas	Municipal Richard Ruíz	3,000	–	–
Lanceros de Cosoleacaque	Cosoleacaque, Veracruz	Unidad Deportiva Miguel Hidalgo	1,000	–	–
Limoneros de Fútbol	Martínez de la Torre, Veracruz	El Cañizo	3,000	–	–
Piñeros de Loma Bonita	Loma Bonita, Oaxaca	20 de Noviembre	1,000	–	–
Real Pueblo Nuevo	Pueblo Nuevo Solistahuacán, Chiapas	Guadalupe	3,000	–	–

=== League table ===
Pos	Team	Pld	W	D	L	GF	GA	GD	BP	Pts	Qualification or relegation
1	Jiquipilas Valle Verde	28	18	8	2	90	31	+59	5	67	Promotion play-offs
2	Cruz Azul Lagunas	28	17	9	2	81	33	+48	7	67	Promotion play-offs
3	Atlético Acayucan	28	18	5	5	78	40	+38	2	61	Promotion play-offs
4	Piñeros de Loma Bonita	28	13	10	5	68	31	+37	6	55	Promotion play-offs
5	Limoneros de Fútbol	28	14	7	7	48	25	+23	2	51	
6	Dragones de Tabasco	28	11	9	8	48	31	+17	5	47	
7	Atlético Boca del Río	28	12	6	10	30	40	−10	5	47	
8	Búhos de Xalapa	28	11	6	11	43	51	−8	2	41	
9	Halcones Marinos de Veracruz	28	9	7	12	45	53	−8	5	39	
10	Atlético Ixtepec	28	8	6	14	38	61	−23	3	33	
11	Delfines UGM	28	8	6	14	42	57	−15	2	32	
12	Cafetaleros de Xalapa	28	7	5	16	28	59	−31	2	28	
13	Brujos de Los Tuxtlas	28	6	6	16	35	73	−38	1	25	
14	Lanceros de Cosoleacaque	28	3	9	16	33	62	−29	3	21	
15	Real Pueblo Nuevo	28	4	3	21	22	82	−60	2	17	

Source: Tercera División FMF

== Group 3 ==
Group with 17 teams from Hidalgo, Oaxaca, Puebla and Veracruz.

=== Teams ===
Location of teams in the 2015–16 3ra División Group 2
Location of teams in the 2015–16 3ra División Group 3 (Ixmiquilpan)

Team	City	Home ground	Capacity	Affiliate	Official Name
Académicos UGM	Orizaba, Veracruz	Universitario UGM Orizaba	1,500	—	—
Albinegros de Orizaba	Orizaba, Veracruz	UGM Nogales	1,500	Albinegros de Orizaba	—
Anlesjeroka	Tehuacán, Puebla	Anlesjeroka	500	—	—
Azucareros de Tezonapa	Tezonapa, Veracruz	Ernesto Jácome	1,000	–	–
CEFOR Cuauhtémoc Blanco	Huauchinango, Puebla	Nido Águila Huauchinango	300	–	–
Deportivo Ixmiquilpan	Ixmiquilpan, Hidalgo	Parque Eco Alberto	1,000	–	Plateados de Cerro Azul
Ferrocarrileros de Zaragoza	Zaragoza, Puebla	Unión Zaragoza	1,000	–	Héroes de Veracruz
Langostineros de Atoyac	Atoyac, Veracruz	Campo Deportivo Atoyac	1,000	–	Santos Córdoba
Lobos BUAP	Puebla City, Puebla	Ciudad Universitaria Puebla	1,000	Lobos BUAP	–
Los Ángeles	Puebla, Puebla	Ex Hacienda San José Maravillas	500	—	—
Petroleros de Poza Rica	Poza Rica, Veracruz	Heriberto Jara Corona	10,000	—	—
Puebla SAI	Santa Isabel Cholula, Puebla	Santa Isabel Cholula	600	Puebla	–
Reales de Puebla	Puebla, Puebla	Preparatoria Benito Juárez	1,000	—	—
Star Club	Tlaxcala City, Tlaxcala	San José del Agua	500	—	—
Sultanes de Tamazunchale	Tamazunchale, San Luis Potosí	Deportivo Solidaridad	1,650	—	—
Tehuacán	Tehuacán, Puebla	Polideportivo La Huizachera	1,000	—	—
Tigrillos Dorados MRCI	San Jerónimo Tlacochahuaya, Oaxaca	Campo Independiente MRCI	3,000	Chapulineros de Oaxaca	–

=== League table ===
Pos	Team	Pld	W	D	L	GF	GA	GD	BP	Pts	Qualification or relegation
1	CEFOR Cuauhtémoc Blanco	32	21	6	5	83	26	+57	4	73	Promotion play-offs
2	Tigrillos Dorados MRCI	32	22	2	8	98	37	+61	2	70	Promotion play-offs
3	Albinegros de Orizaba	32	22	3	7	76	33	+43	1	70	Promotion play-offs
4	Académicos UGM	32	20	5	7	71	32	+39	2	67	Promotion play-offs
5	Sultanes de Tamazunchale	32	19	5	8	56	27	+29	4	66	Promotion play-offs
6	Langostineros de Atoyac	32	17	9	6	76	34	+42	4	64	
7	Lobos BUAP	32	18	5	9	55	34	+21	3	62	
8	Petroleros de Poza Rica	32	13	9	10	51	49	+2	3	51	
9	Los Ángeles	32	12	7	13	47	45	+2	3	46	
10	Azucareros de Tezonapa	32	11	8	13	47	49	−2	2	43	
11	Anlesjeroka	32	10	8	14	45	50	−5	3	41	
12	Star Club	32	10	6	16	57	62	−5	4	40	
13	Reales de Puebla	32	8	7	17	30	62	−32	2	33	
14	Tehuacán	32	8	3	21	42	80	−38	3	30	
15	Ferrocarrileros de Zaragoza	32	6	6	20	33	77	−44	3	27	
16	Puebla SAI	32	5	6	21	38	115	−77	2	23	
17	Deportivo Ixmiquilpan	32	2	1	29	14	110	−96	1	8	

Source: Tercera División FMF

== Group 4 ==
Group with 18 teams from Greater Mexico City.

=== Teams ===
Location of teams in the 2016–17 3ra División Group 4 (Greater Mexico City urban area)
Location of teams in the 2015–16 3ra División Group 4 (Greater Mexico City rural area)

Team	City	Home ground	Capacity	Affiliate	Official name
Águilas de Teotihuacán	Teotihuacán, State of Mexico	Municipal Acolman	1,000	–	–
Álamos	Venustiano Carranza, Mexico City	Magdalena Mixhuca Sports City	500	–	–
Alebrijes de Oaxaca	Huixquilucan de Degollado, State of Mexico	Alberto Pérez Navarro	3,000	Alebrijes de Oaxaca	–
Ángeles de la Ciudad	Iztacalco, Mexico City	Jesús Martínez "Palillo"	6,000	–	–
Azules de la Sección 26	Gustavo A. Madero, Mexico City	Deportivo Francisco Zarco	500	Pachuca	–
Castores Gobrantacto	Iztapalapa, Mexico City	Deportivo Francisco I. Madero	2,000	–	–
Chivas FIM	Iztapalapa, Mexico City	Deportivo Francisco I. Madero	2,000	Guadalajara	Halcones del Valle del Mezquital
Deportivo Iztacalco	Chapa de Mota, State of Mexico	Unidad Deportiva Chapa de Mota	1,000	–	–
Dragones de Xochimilco	Xochimilco, Mexico City	Momoxco	3,500	–	–
Marina	Xochimilco, Mexico City	Valentín González	5,000	–	–
Maya Panteras	Iztacalco, Mexico City	Magdalena Mixhuca Sports City	500	–	Novillos Neza
Morelos Ecatepec	Ecatepec, State of Mexico	Magdalena Mixhuca Sports City	500	–	–
Pumas UNAM	Coyoacán, Mexico City	La Cantera	2,000	Pumas UNAM	–
Real Olmeca Sport	Iztacalco, Mexico City	Magdalena Mixhuca Sports City	500	–	–
San José del Arenal	Chalco, State of Mexico	José Carbajal García	1,000	–	–
Santa Rosa	Venustiano Carranza, Mexico City	Deportivo Plutarco Elías Calles	1,000	–	–
Tecamachalco Sur	Huixquilucan de Degollado, State of Mexico	Alberto Pérez Navarro	3,000	–	Ajax Jiutepec
Texcoco	Texcoco, State of Mexico	Unidad Deportiva Silverio Pérez	1,500	–	San Andrés

=== League table ===
Pos	Team	Pld	W	D	L	GF	GA	GD	BP	Pts	Qualification or relegation
1	Marina	34	28	4	2	94	19	+75	0	88	Promotion play-offs
2	Alebrijes de Oaxaca	34	23	7	4	79	20	+59	6	82	Reserve Teams play-offs
3	Álamos	34	21	9	4	71	26	+45	2	74	Promotion play-offs
4	Ángeles de la Ciudad	34	21	7	6	80	33	+47	3	73	Promotion play-offs
5	Pumas UNAM	34	21	5	8	99	36	+63	3	71	
6	Azules de la Sección 26	34	16	9	9	57	32	+25	8	65	Promotion play-offs
7	Real Olmeca Sport	34	18	5	11	56	46	+10	2	61	Promotion play-offs
8	Texcoco	34	15	8	11	60	57	+3	7	60	
9	Dragones de Xochimilco	34	15	8	11	45	32	+13	3	56	
10	Castores Gobrantacto	34	14	6	14	63	57	+6	4	52	
11	Santa Rosa	34	14	7	13	56	54	+2	3	52	
12	Tecamachalco Sur	34	12	5	17	50	72	−22	1	42	
13	Morelos Ecatepec	34	10	2	22	33	88	−55	0	32	
14	Águilas de Teotihuacán	34	5	9	20	33	64	−31	4	28	
15	Maya Panteras	34	7	3	24	28	84	−56	1	25	
16	Chivas FIM	34	5	5	24	30	75	−45	4	24	
17	San José del Arenal	34	6	5	23	31	90	−59	1	24	
18	Deportivo Iztacalco	34	1	4	29	26	114	−88	2	9	

Source: Tercera División FMF

== Group 5 ==
Group with 16 teams from Guerrero, Mexico City and State of Mexico.

Location of teams in the 2015–16 3ra División Group 5

=== Teams ===
Team	City	Home ground	Capacity	Affiliate	Official name
Atlante	Tultitlán, State of Mexico	Nuevo Territorio Azulgrana	500	Atlante	–
Atlético CACSA	Metepec, State of Mexico	Instituto Tecnológico de Toluca	500	–	Manchester Metepec
Atlético UEFA	Coacalco, State of Mexico	Campos Fragoso	500	–	–
Colorines	Villa Colorines, State of Mexico	Maracaná	1,000	–	–
Deportivo Vallesano	Valle de Bravo, State of Mexico	La Capilla	1,000	–	–
Estudiantes de Atlacomulco	Atlacomulco, State of Mexico	Ignacio Pichardo Pagaza	2,000	–	–
Fuerza Mazahua	Atlacomulco, State of Mexico	Ignacio Pichardo Pagaza	2,000	–	–
Futcenter	Tlalnepantla de Baz, State of Mexico	Deportivo Santa Cecilia	1,000	–	–
Gladiadores Calentanos	Arcelia, Guerrero	Unidad Deportiva Emperador Cuauhtémoc	4,000	–	Leones de Lomar
Grupo Sherwood	Metepec, State of Mexico	La Hortaliza	1,000	–	–
Jilotepec	Jilotepec, State of Mexico	Rubén Chávez Chávez	2,000	–	–
Metepec	Metepec, State of Mexico	Cancha Arqueros FC	1,000	–	–
Potros UAEM	Toluca, State of Mexico	Alberto "Chivo" Córdoba	32,603	Potros UAEM	–
Real Halcones	Atizapán de Zaragoza, State of Mexico	Deportivo Ana Gabriela Guevara	2,500	–	–
Sporting Canamy	Milpa Alta, Mexico City	Momoxco	3,500	Sporting Canamy	–
Tejupilco	Tejupilco, State of Mexico	Unidad Deportiva Tejupilco	1,000	–	–

=== League table ===
Pos	Team	Pld	W	D	L	GF	GA	GD	BP	Pts	Qualification or relegation
1	Potros UAEM	30	20	6	4	64	18	+46	5	71	Promotion play-offs
2	Jilotepec	30	16	9	5	47	35	+12	6	63	Promotion play-offs
3	Gladiadores Calentanos	30	16	8	6	80	34	+46	4	60	Promotion play-offs
4	Sporting Canamy	30	17	6	7	65	29	+36	3	60	Promotion play-offs
5	Estudiantes de Atlacomulco	30	17	5	8	65	31	+34	2	58	Promotion play-offs
6	Futcenter	30	16	5	9	55	38	+17	2	55	
7	Atlético UEFA	30	14	7	9	42	24	+18	3	52	
8	Atlante	30	11	8	11	30	38	−8	5	46	
9	Atlético CACSA	30	12	5	13	36	46	−10	3	44	
10	Deportivo Vallesano	30	9	10	11	32	27	+5	3	40	
11	Colorines	30	8	9	13	35	52	−17	5	38	
12	Tejupilco	30	7	9	14	44	56	−12	4	34	
13	Real Halcones	30	8	6	16	38	53	−15	4	34	
14	Deportivo Metepec	30	6	9	15	27	51	−24	3	30	
15	Grupo Sherwood	30	4	9	17	24	66	−42	3	24	
16	Fuerza Mazahua	30	3	1	26	26	112	−86	1	11	

Source: Tercera División FMF

== Group 6 ==
Group with 16 teams from Guerrero, Hidalgo, Morelos, Puebla and State of Mexico.

=== Teams ===
Location of teams in the 2015–16 3ra División Group 6 (Morelos)
Location of teams in the 2015–16 3ra División Group 6 (Guerrero)
Location of teams in the 2015–16 3ra División Group 6 (Hidalgo, Puebla and State of Mexico)

Team	City	Home ground	Capacity	Affiliate	Official name
Acapulco	Acapulco, Guerrero	Hugo Sánchez	6,000	–	–
Alpha	Puebla City, Puebla	Club Alpha 3	3,000	–	–
Águilas UAGro	Chilpancingo, Guerrero	Andrés Figueroa	2,000	–	Vikingos de Chalco
Alacranes de Puente de Ixtla	Puente de Ixtla, Morelos	Lino Espín	3,000	–	Ballenas Galeana Morelos
Atitalaquia	Atitalaquía, Hidalgo	Unidad Deportiva Municipal	1,000	–	Iguala
Atlético Cuernavaca	Cuernavaca, Morelos	Centenario	14,500	–	–
Atlético Unión	Pachuca, Hidalgo	Club Hidalguense	600	–	Chimbombos F.C.
Cefor Chaco Giménez	Atizapán de Zaragoza, State of Mexico	Deportivo Ana Gabriela Guevara	2,500	–	–
Chilpancingo	Chilpancingo, Guerrero	Polideportivo Chilpancingo	1,000	–	–
Guerreros de Tierra Caliente	Ciudad Altamirano, Guerrero	Rogelio García	1,000	–	–
Ixtapaluca	Ixtapaluca, State of Mexico	La Era	1,000	–	
JFS Yautepec	Yautepec, Morelos	Unidad Deportiva San Carlos	1,000	–	–
Real Acapulco	Acapulco, Guerrero	Unidad Deportiva Acapulco	13,000	–	Texcoco
Selva Cañera	Tlayacapan, Morelos	Unidad Deportiva Tlayacapan	1,000	–	–
SEP Puebla	Puebla City, Puebla	Unidad Deportiva Mario Vázquez Raña	800	–	–
Tecuanes de Tepalcingo	Tepalcingo, Morelos	Unidad Deportiva Tepalcingo	1,000	–	

=== League table ===
Pos	Team	Pld	W	D	L	GF	GA	GD	BP	Pts	Qualification or relegation
1	Águilas UAGro	30	22	2	6	96	30	+66	0	68	Promotion play-offs
2	Chilpancingo	30	19	6	5	88	28	+60	4	67	Promotion play-offs
3	Selva Cañera	30	17	10	3	59	20	+39	6	67	Promotion play-offs
4	SEP Puebla	30	19	7	4	98	24	+74	2	66	Promotion play-offs
5	Alpha	30	16	7	7	63	28	+35	5	60	
6	Real Acapulco	30	17	4	9	67	43	+24	3	58	
7	Atlético Cuernavaca	30	17	4	9	52	38	+14	3	58	
8	Tecuanes de Tepalcingo	30	15	5	10	56	36	+20	2	52	
9	Acapulco	30	15	5	10	49	39	+10	2	52	
10	Alacranes de Puente de Ixtla	30	14	6	10	56	35	+21	3	51	
11	Ixtapaluca	30	11	4	15	52	58	−6	2	39	
12	Cefor Chaco Giménez	30	8	5	17	47	66	−19	1	30	
13	JFS Yautepec	30	4	5	21	32	144	−112	1	18	
14	Guerreros de Tierra Caliente	30	4	2	24	22	77	−55	2	16	
15	Atitalaquia	30	3	1	26	26	106	−80	0	10	
16	Atlético Unión	30	2	1	27	19	110	−91	1	8	

Source: Tercera División FMF

== Group 7 ==
Group with 18 teams from Greater Mexico City and Hidalgo.

=== Teams ===
Location of teams in the 2016–17 3ra División Group 7 (Hidalgo)
Location of teams in the 2015–16 3ra División Group 7 (Greater Mexico City)

Team	City	Home ground	Capacity	Affiliate	Official name
Alto Rendimiento Tuzo	San Agustín Tlaxiaca, Hidalgo	Universidad del Fútbol	1,000	Pachuca	–
Atlético de Madrid	Tlalpan, Mexico City	Centro Social y Deportivo Rosario Iglesias	6,000	Atlético Madrid	–
Atlético Estado de México	Cuautitlán Izcalli, State of Mexico	Hugo Sánchez Márquez	3,500	Atlético Estado de México	–
Atlético San Juan de Aragón	Papalotla, State of Mexico	Deportivo Municipal Papalotla	500	–	–
Aztecas AMF Soccer	Naucalpan, State of Mexico	Deportivo Hacienda	1,000	–	–
Buendía	Iztacalco, Mexico City	Magdalena Mixhuca Sports City	500	–	–
Cafetaleros Alcaldes	Ixtapaluca, State of Mexico	Unidad Deportiva La Antorcha	2,300	Cafetaleros de Tapachula	Alcaldes de Lagos
Cuervos Blancos	Cuautitlán, State of Mexico	Los Pinos	5,000	–	Tolcayuca
Escuela de Alto Rendimiento	Huixquilucan de Degollado, State of Mexico	Universidad Anáhuac México Norte	300	–	–
Guerreros de Tizayuca	Tizayuca, Hidalgo	Unidad Deportiva Tizayuca	1,000	–	–
Hidalguense	Pachuca, Hidalgo	Club Hidalguense	600	–	–
Independiente Mexiquense	Cuautitlán, State of Mexico	Los Pinos	5,000	–	–
Politécnico	Venustiano Carranza, Mexico City	Deportivo Venustiano Carranza	500	–	–
Proyecto Nuevo Chimalhuacán	Chimalhuacán, State of Mexico	Deportivo La Laguna	2,000	Nuevo Chimalhuacán	–
Promodep Central	Cuautitlán, State of Mexico	Los Pinos	5,000	–	–
Santiago Tulantepec	Santiago Tulantepec, Hidalgo	Unidad Deportiva Conrado Muntane	1,000	–	–
Unión Acolman	Acolman, State of Mexico	San Carlos Tepexpan	1,200	–	–
Universidad del Fútbol	San Agustín Tlaxiaca, Hidalgo	Universidad del Fútbol	1,000	Pachuca	–

=== League table ===
Pos	Team	Pld	W	D	L	GF	GA	GD	BP	Pts	Qualification or relegation
1	Alto Rendimiento Tuzo	34	26	7	1	114	22	+92	5	90	Promotion play-offs
2	Atlético de Madrid	34	25	7	2	112	30	+82	5	87	Promotion play-offs
3	Hidalguense	34	22	7	5	62	21	+41	4	77	Promotion play-offs
4	Universidad del Fútbol	34	23	5	6	78	40	+38	1	75	Promotion play-offs
5	Escuela de Alto Rendimiento	34	19	6	9	74	30	+44	4	67	Promotion play-offs
6	Atlético Estado de México	34	17	9	8	66	40	+26	3	63	
7	Aztecas AMF Soccer	34	15	7	12	63	57	+6	4	56	
8	Independiente Mexiquense	34	13	4	17	48	70	−22	3	46	
9	Proyecto Nuevo Chimalhuacán	34	9	11	14	45	54	−9	7	45	
10	Cuervos Blancos	34	11	7	16	50	63	−13	4	44	
11	Santiago Tulantepec	34	11	8	15	38	59	−21	3	44	
12	Atlético San Juan de Aragón	34	11	8	15	49	65	−16	1	42	
13	Promodep Central	34	10	7	17	57	87	−30	5	42	
14	Politécnico	34	12	2	20	48	71	−23	1	39	
15	Cafetaleros Alcaldes	34	10	5	19	75	91	−16	2	37	
16	Guerreros de Tizayuca	34	7	7	20	35	72	−37	1	29	
17	Buendía	34	4	9	21	29	68	−39	3	24	
18	Unión Acolman	34	2	2	30	16	119	−103	0	8	

Source: Tercera División FMF

== Group 8 ==
Group with 17 teams from Guanajuato, Hidalgo, Michoacán and Querétaro.

=== Teams ===
Location of teams in the 2016–17 3ra División Group 8 (Guanajuato and Querétaro)
Location of teams in the 2015–16 3ra División Group 8 (Michoacán)
Location of teams in the 2015–16 3ra División Group 3 (Ixmiquilpan)

Team	City	Home ground	Capacity	Affiliate	Official name
América Zihuatanejo	Zihuatanejo, Guerrero	Unidad Deportiva Zihuatanejo	1,000	América	Deportivo Corregidora
Atlético Iztacalco	Colón, Querétaro	Unidad Deportiva Javier Salinas Guevara	1,000	–	–
Celaya	Celaya, Guanajuato	Instituto Tecnológico Celaya	1,000	Celaya	–
Delfines de Abasolo	Abasolo, Guanajuato	Municipal de Abasolo	2,500	–	–
Guitarreros de Paracho	Paracho, Michoacán	Municipal de Paracho	2,000	–	Monarcas Zacapu
Irapuato	Pueblo Nuevo, Guanajuato	Unidad Deportiva Pueblo Nuevo	1,000	Irapuato	Tulyehualco
Jaral del Progreso	Jaral del Progreso, Guanajuato	Unidad Deportiva Municipal	1,000	–	–
Mangueros de Múgica	Nueva Italia, Michoacán	Unidad Deportiva Rosendo Arnaiz	1,500	–	Toros de Tequisquiapan
Marnap	Ixmiquilpan, Hidalgo	Deportivo Marnap	1,000	–	Tota Carbajal
Monarcas Morelia	Tarímbaro, Michoacán	Unidad Deportiva La Compuerta	1,000	Monarcas Morelia	Limoneros de Apatzingán
Monarcas Salamanca	Zacapu, Michoacán	Municipal Zacapu	2,500	Monarcas Morelia	–
Originales Aguacateros	Uruapan, Michoacán	Unidad Deportiva Hermanos López Rayón	5,000	–	–
Querétaro	Querétaro, Querétaro	Parque Bicentenario	1,000	Querétaro	–
Salamanca	Salamanca, Guanajuato	El Molinito	2,500	–	–
San Juan del Río	Querétaro City, Querétaro	Unidad Deportiva La Cañada	1,000	–	–
Tigres Blancos Gestalt	Morelia, Michoacán	Venustiano Carranza	22,000	–	–
CDU Uruapan	Uruapan, Michoacán	Unidad Deportiva Hermanos López Rayón	5,000	CDU Uruapan	Zapata

=== League table ===
Pos	Team	Pld	W	D	L	GF	GA	GD	BP	Pts	Qualification or relegation
1	Monarcas Morelia	32	22	6	4	96	29	+67	6	78	Promotion play-offs
2	Salamanca	32	20	11	1	74	30	+44	6	77	Promotion play-offs
3	CDU Uruapan	32	19	9	4	68	37	+31	6	72	Promotion play-offs
4	Tigres Blancos Gestalt	32	21	5	6	89	31	+58	1	69	Promotion play-offs
5	Celaya	32	19	6	7	76	38	+38	4	67	
6	Originales Aguacateros de Uruapan	32	18	6	8	61	38	+23	5	65	Promotion play-offs
7	Monarcas Salamanca	32	19	5	8	79	32	+47	2	64	
8	Querétaro	32	18	5	9	84	45	+39	4	63	
9	América Zihuatanejo	32	12	6	14	58	52	+6	3	45	
10	Jaral del Progreso	32	10	7	15	37	40	−3	3	40	
11	Delfines de Abasolo	32	11	3	18	56	68	−12	1	37	
12	Marnap	32	9	7	16	50	57	−7	0	34	
13	Guitarreros de Paracho	32	9	6	17	57	79	−22	0	33	
14	Mangueros de Múgica	32	8	2	22	41	90	−49	0	26	
15	Irapuato	32	5	4	23	34	96	−62	3	22	
16	San Juan del Río	32	7	0	25	25	85	−60	0	21	
17	Atlético Iztacalco	32	1	0	31	13	151	−138	0	3	

Source: Tercera División FMF

== Group 9 ==
Group with 18 teams from Aguascalientes, Guanajuato, Jalisco, Michoacán and Zacatecas.

=== Teams ===
Location of teams in the 2015–16 3ra División Group 9 (Guanajuato and Michoacán)
Location of teams in the 2015–16 3ra División Group 9 (Aguascalientes and Zacatecas)
Location of teams in the 2015–16 3ra División Group 9 (Jalisco)

Team	City	Home ground	Capacity	Affiliate	Official name
Águilas Reales de Zacatecas	Zacatecas City, Zacatecas	Francisco Villa	13,000	–	–
Apaseo el Alto	Apaseo el Alto, Guanajuato	Unidad Deportiva Manuel Ávila Camacho	1,000	–	–
Atlético ECCA	León, Guanajuato	Lalo Gutiérrez	1,000	–	–
Atlético Huejutla	Morelos, Zacatecas	Unidad Deportiva Héctor Esparza	1,000	–	–
Atlético San Francisco	San Francisco del Rincón, Guanajuato	Domingo Velázquez	3,500	–	–
Brujos de Jesús María	Jesús María, Aguascalientes	Deportivo Luis Donaldo Colosio	1,000	–	–
Deportivo Los Altos	Guadalajara, Jalisco	Parque de la Solidaridad	1,500	Deportivo Los Altos	–
Frailes de Jerez	Jerez, Zacatecas	Ramón López Velarde	3,000	–	Frailes Homape
La Piedad	La Piedad, Michoacán	Juan N. López	13,356	La Piedad	Libertadores de Pénjamo
León Independiente	Guanajuato City, Guanajuato	Unidad Deportiva Juan José Torres Landa	1,000	–	–
Mineros de Fresnillo	Fresnillo, Zacatecas	Minera Fresnillo	6,000	Mineros de Fresnillo	–
Mineros de Zacatecas	Guadalupe, Zacatecas	Unidad Deportiva Guadalupe	500	Mineros de Zacatecas	–
Real Aguascalientes	Aguascalientes, Aguascalientes	Centro Deportivo Ferrocarrilero Tres Centurias	1,000	–	–
Real Leonés	Unión de San Antonio, Jalisco	Unidad Deportiva Domingo Alba	1,000	–	–
Tlajomulco	Lagos de Moreno, Jalisco	Somnus F.C.	2,000	–	–
Tuzos UAZ	Zacatecas, Zacatecas	Universitario Unidad Deportiva Norte	5,000	Tuzos UAZ	–
Unión de Curtidores	León, Guanajuato		1,000	–	Club Cabezas Rojas
Unión León	León, Guanajuato	Club Empress	500	–	–

=== League table ===
Pos	Team	Pld	W	D	L	GF	GA	GD	BP	Pts	Qualification or relegation
1	Real Leonés	34	26	3	5	100	38	+62	3	84	Promotion play-offs
2	Mineros de Zacatecas	34	25	5	4	121	33	+88	3	83	Reserve Teams play-offs
3	Real Aguascalientes	34	25	5	4	95	33	+62	1	81	Promotion play-offs
4	Tuzos UAZ	34	20	8	6	91	39	+52	5	73	Promotion play-offs
5	Mineros de Fresnillo	34	22	3	9	80	39	+41	0	69	Promotion play-offs
6	Deportivo Los Altos	34	18	8	8	95	51	+44	4	66	Promotion play-offs
7	Atlético ECCA	34	18	6	10	63	34	+29	3	63	
8	Frailes de Jerez	34	15	6	13	51	48	+3	3	54	
9	La Piedad	34	14	8	12	75	57	+18	3	53	
10	Unión de Curtidores	34	11	12	11	30	36	−6	8	53	
11	Águilas Reales de Zacatecas	34	11	10	13	48	44	+4	6	49	
12	Unión León	34	13	5	16	50	61	−11	1	45	
13	Atlético San Francisco	34	11	6	17	62	76	−14	4	43	
14	León Independiente	34	9	10	15	61	93	−32	4	41	
15	Atlético Huejutla	34	6	4	24	25	75	−50	1	23	
16	Tlajomulco	34	6	2	26	35	123	−88	1	21	
17	Apaseo el Alto	34	3	1	30	15	93	−78	1	11	
18	Brujos de Jesús María	34	2	0	32	13	137	−124	0	6	

Source: Tercera División FMF

== Group 10 ==
Group with 20 teams from Colima, Jalisco and Michoacán.

=== Teams ===
Location of teams in the 2015–16 3ra División Group 10

Team	City	Home ground	Capacity	Affiliate	Official name
Acatlán	Acatlán de Juárez, Jalisco	Club Juárez	1,500	–	Vaqueros Bellavista
Atlético Tecomán	Tecomán, Colima	Víctor Eduardo Sevilla Torres	2,000	–	–
Aves Blancas	Tepatitlán de Morelos, Jalisco	Corredor Industrial	1,200	–	–
Charales de Chapala	Chapala, Jalisco	Municipal Juan Rayo	1,000	–	–
Conejos Tuxpan	Tuxpan, Jalisco	Unidad Deportiva Municipal	1,000	–	–
Escuela de Fútbol Chivas	Zapopan, Jalisco	Chivas San Rafael	500	Guadalajara	–
Jalisco	El Salto, Jalisco	De los Mamuts	1,000	–	Mamuts de El Salto
Nuevo México	Nuevo México, Jalisco	Club Deportivo Occidente	1,000	–	–
Nuevos Valores de Ocotlán	Ocotlán, Jalisco	Municipal Benito Juárez	1,500	Leones Negros UdeG	–
Oro Guadalajara	Zapopan, Jalisco	Unidad Deportiva La Primavera / De los Mamuts	3,000 / 1,000	–	–
Palmeros	Colima City, Colima	Colima	12,000	–	Deportivo Colegio Guanajuato
Picudos de Manzanillo	Manzanillo, Colima	Adolfo López Mateos	2,000	–	–
Queseros de San José	San José de Gracia, Michoacán	Juanito Chávez	1,500	–	–
Chivas PROAN	San Juan de los Lagos, Jalisco	San Martín	1,000	Guadalajara	Real San Cosme
Sahuayo	Sahuayo, Michoacán	Unidad Deportiva Municipal	1,500	Sahuayo	–
Tepatitlán	Tepatitlán de Morelos, Jalisco	Gregorio "Tepa" Gómez	12,500	Tepatitlán	–
Valle del Grullo	Tlaquepaque, Jalisco	San Andrés	2,500	–	–
Tornados Tlaquepaque	Tlaquepaque, Jalisco	San Andrés	2,500	–	Atlético Cocula
Vaqueros	Tlaquepaque, Jalisco	Club Vaqueros Ixtlán	1,000	–	–
Volcanes de Colima	Manzanillo, Colima	Country Club Manzanillo	1,000	–	–

=== League table ===
Pos	Team	Pld	W	D	L	GF	GA	GD	BP	Pts	Qualification or relegation
1	Acatlán	38	29	5	4	96	24	+72	2	94	Promotion play-offs
2	Vaqueros	38	25	9	4	88	28	+60	4	88	Promotion play-offs
3	Aves Blancas	38	20	13	5	86	41	+45	11	84	Promotion play-offs
4	Palmeros	38	24	9	5	74	25	+49	2	83	Promotion play-offs
5	Nuevos Valores de Ocotlán	38	25	5	8	109	44	+65	2	82	Promotion play-offs
6	Tepatitlán	38	23	8	7	122	38	+84	3	80	
7	Chivas PROAN	38	19	8	11	99	66	+33	5	70	
8	Sahuayo	38	18	7	13	78	47	+31	4	65	
9	Charales de Chapala	38	20	4	14	67	48	+19	1	65	
10	Picudos de Manzanillo	38	17	9	12	67	54	+13	4	64	
11	Atlético Tecomán	38	19	3	16	85	66	+19	2	62	
12	Queseros de San José	38	13	9	16	55	68	−13	7	55	
13	Escuela de Fútbol Chivas	38	15	6	17	71	60	+11	2	53	
14	Tornados Tlaquepaque	38	15	4	19	58	70	−12	1	50	
15	Nuevo México	38	10	9	19	50	62	−12	7	46	
16	Jalisco	38	11	5	22	44	67	−23	0	38	
17	Conejos Tuxpan	38	8	2	28	51	121	−70	0	26	
18	Valle del Grullo	38	5	4	29	40	121	−81	2	21	
19	Oro Guadalajara	38	2	2	34	20	142	−122	1	9	
20	Volcanes de Colima	38	1	1	36	13	181	−168	0	4	

Source: Tercera División FMF

== Group 11 ==
Group with 20 teams from Jalisco, Nayarit and Sinaloa.

=== Teams ===
Location of teams in the 2015–16 3ra División Group 11 (Jalisco, Nayarit and Sinaloa)

Team	City	Home ground	Capacity	Affiliate	Official name
Atlas	Zapopan, Jalisco	Club Atlas Chapalitea	1,000	Atlas	–
Atlético La Mina	Tepic, Nayarit	Olímpico Santa Teresita	4,000	–	–
Atotonilco	Atotonilco El Alto, Jalisco	Unidad Deportiva Margarito Ramírez	1,000	–	–
Buscando un Campeón	Zapopan, Jalisco	Cancha Morumbí	500	–	–
CAFESSA	Ameca, Jalisco	Núcleo Deportivo y de Espectáculos Ameca	4,000	–	Cazcanes de Ameca
Camaroneros de Escuinapa	Escuinapa, Sinaloa	Perla Camaronera	1,000	–	Deportivo La Cruz
Cocula	Zapopan, Jalisco	Club Deportivo La Primavera	3,000	–	–
Colegio Albert Schweitzer	Guadalajara, Jalisco	Club Maracaná	1,000	–	–
Coras	Tepic, Nayarit	Olímpico Santa Teresita	4,000	Coras	–
Deportivo La Peñita	La Peñita de Jaltemba, Nayarit	Unidad Deportiva Corazón de La Riviera	1,000	–	–
Gallos Viejos	Zapopan, Jalisco	Deportivo Sindicato de Telefonistas	1,000	–	–
Guadalajara	Zapopan, Jalisco	Verde Valle	800	Guadalajara	–
Juventud Unida	Tlajomulco de Zúñiga, Jalisco	Club Desspeja	1,000	–	–
Leones Negros UdeG	Zapopan, Jalisco	Club Deportivo La Primavera	3,000	Leones Negros UdeG	–
Lobos de Zihuatanejo	Zapopan, Jalisco	Club Deportivo Occidente	1,000	–	–
Nacional	Guadalajara, Jalisco	Club Deportivo Occidente	1,000	–	–
Oro El Salto	El Salto, Jalisco	De los Mamuts	1,000	–	Teca Huixquilucan
Sufacen Tepic	Tepic, Nayarit	Club Sufacen Libramiento	500	–	–
Tecos	Zapopan, Jalisco	Tres de Marzo	18,779	–	–
Xalisco	Xalisco, Nayarit	Unidad Deportiva Landereñas	500	–	–

=== League table ===
Pos	Team	Pld	W	D	L	GF	GA	GD	BP	Pts	Qualification or relegation
1	Atlas	38	28	3	7	115	42	+73	1	88	Reserve Teams play-offs
2	Guadalajara	38	26	6	6	108	37	+71	3	87	Reserve Teams play-offs
3	Tecos	38	24	8	6	108	41	+67	7	87	Promotion play-offs
4	Coras	38	24	6	8	81	49	+32	4	82	Reserve Teams play-offs
5	Leones Negros UdeG	38	25	4	9	78	30	+48	2	81	Promotion play-offs
6	Buscando un Campeón	38	23	5	10	83	50	+33	2	76	Promotion play-offs
7	Xalisco	38	19	9	10	79	46	+33	4	70	Promotion play-offs
8	Cocula	38	20	5	13	80	48	+32	1	66	Promotion play-offs
9	Atlético La Mina	38	12	16	10	48	47	+1	11	63	
10	Camaroneros de Escuinapa	38	18	5	15	71	58	+13	1	60	
11	Deportivo La Peñita	38	15	8	15	63	84	−21	4	57	
12	CAFESSA	38	16	6	16	75	74	+1	2	56	
13	Sufacen Tepic	38	12	6	20	67	93	−26	6	48	
14	Juventud Unida	38	11	9	18	50	69	−19	3	45	
15	Nacional	38	11	5	22	51	76	−25	2	40	
16	Atotonilco	38	8	10	20	52	88	−36	6	40	
17	Lobos de Zihuatanejo	38	9	1	28	29	82	−53	0	28	
18	Colegio Albert Schweitzer	38	8	2	28	49	116	−67	0	26	
19	Gallos Viejos	38	5	4	29	35	87	−52	1	20	
20	Oro El Salto	38	5	4	29	21	126	−105	1	20	

Source: Tercera División FMF

== Group 12 ==
Group with 15 teams from Coahuila, Nuevo León, San Luis Potosí and Tamaulipas.

=== Teams ===
Location of teams in the 2015–16 3ra División Group 12 (Tamasopo, S.L.P. and Tamaulipas)
Location of teams in the 2015–16 3ra División Group 12 (Matehuala, S.L.P and Nuevo León)
Location of teams in the 2015–16 3ra División Group 12 (Coahuila)

Team	City	Home ground	Capacity	Affiliate	Official name
Atlético Altamira	Altamira, Tamaulipas	Lázaro Cárdenas	2,500	–	–
Bravos de Nuevo Laredo	Nuevo Laredo, Tamaulipas	Unidad Deportiva Benito Juárez	5,000	–	–
Correcaminos UAT	Ciudad Victoria, Tamaulipas	Universitario Eugenio Alvizo Porras	5,000	Correcaminos UAT	–
Gavilanes de Matamoros	Matamoros, Tamaulipas	Pedro Salazar Maldonado	3,000	–	Ho Gar H. Matamoros
Halcones de Saltillo	Saltillo, Coahuila	Olímpico Francisco I. Madero	7,000	–	San Isidro Laguna F.C.
Jaguares de Nuevo León	San Nicolás de los Garza, Nuevo León	Unidad Deportiva Oriente	1,000	–	–
Madero	Ciudad Madero, Tamaulipas	Olímpico de Ciudad Madero	6,000	–	Coyotes de Saltillo
Panteras Negras GNL	Guadalupe, Nuevo León	Unidad Deportiva La Talaverna	5,000	–	–
Saltillo Soccer	Saltillo, Coahuila	Olímpico Francisco I. Madero	7,000	–	–
Tamasopo	Tamasopo, San Luis Potosí	Unidad Deportiva El Chacuaco	1,000	–	Gallos Hidrocálidos
Tampico	Tampico, Tamaulipas	Unidad Deportiva Tampico	1,500	–	Orinegros de Ciudad Madero
Tigres SD	General Zuazua, Nuevo León	La Cueva de Zuazua	800	Tigres UANL	–
Titanes de Saltillo	Saltillo, Coahuila	Olímpico Francisco I. Madero	7,000	–	Pato Baeza
Troyanos UDEM	San Pedro Garza García, Nuevo León	Universidad de Monterrey	1,000	–	–
Tuneros de Matehuala	Matehuala, San Luis Potosí	Manuel Moreno Torres	2,000	–	–

=== League table ===
Pos	Team	Pld	W	D	L	GF	GA	GD	BP	Pts	Qualification or relegation
1	Titanes de Saltillo	28	21	5	2	82	30	+52	3	71	Promotion play-offs
2	Tigres SD	28	18	6	4	66	22	+44	5	65	Reserve Teams play-offs
3	Troyanos UDEM	28	18	4	6	52	31	+21	3	61	Promotion play-offs
4	Gavilanes de Matamoros	28	16	6	6	49	26	+23	3	57	Promotion play-offs
5	Saltillo Soccer	28	14	9	5	60	38	+22	5	56	Promotion play-offs
6	Correcaminos UAT	28	15	6	7	66	33	+33	4	55	
7	Tampico	28	13	5	10	42	29	+13	2	46	
8	Bravos de Nuevo Laredo	28	11	3	14	32	36	−4	3	39	
9	Tamasopo	28	9	6	13	36	46	−10	3	36	
10	Atlético Altamira	28	8	6	14	31	44	−13	2	32	
11	Jaguares de Nuevo León	28	8	5	15	41	47	−6	1	30	
12	Panteras Negras GNL	28	5	6	17	26	45	−19	2	23	
13	Tuneros de Matehuala	28	7	2	19	30	80	−50	0	23	
14	Halcones de Saltillo	28	5	5	18	35	91	−56	2	22	
15	Madero	28	3	4	21	27	77	−50	1	14	

Source: Tercera División FMF

== Group 13 ==
Group with 10 teams from Baja California, Baja California Sur, Sinaloa and Sonora.

=== Teams ===
Location of teams in the 2015–16 3ra División Group 13

Team	City	Home ground	Capacity	Affiliate	Official name
Águilas UAS	Culiacán, Sinaloa	Universitario UAS	3,500	–	–
Deportivo Ensenada	Ensenada, Baja California	Municipal de Ensenada	7,600	–	–
Deportivo Obregón	Ciudad Obregón, Sonora	Manuel "Piri" Sagasta	4,000	–	–
Diablos Azules de Guasave	Guasave, Sinaloa	Armando "Kory" Leyson	9,000	–	–
Guerreros La Cruz	La Cruz, Sinaloa	Juan Lauro Martínez Barreda	1,000	–	–
Guerreros Pericúes	Cabo San Lucas, Baja California Sur	Complejo Deportivo Don Koll	3,500	–	–
Héroes de Caborca	Caborca, Sonora	Fidencio Hernández	3,000	–	–
Pelicanos de Puerto Peñasco	Puerto Peñasco, Sonora	La Unidad	3,000	–	–
Poblado Miguel Alemán	Miguel Alemán, Sonora	Alejandro López Caballero	4,000	Cimarrones de Sonora	–
Titanes de Nogales	Nogales, Sonora	Jesús Jegar García	2,000	–	–

=== League table ===
Pos	Team	Pld	W	D	L	GF	GA	GD	BP	Pts	Qualification or relegation
1	Águilas UAS	18	13	3	2	43	11	+32	2	44	Promotion play-offs
2	Poblado Miguel Alemán	18	10	5	3	37	24	+13	3	38	Reserve Teams play-offs
3	Deportivo Obregón	18	10	4	4	37	19	+18	2	36	Promotion play-offs
4	Deportivo Ensenada	18	10	1	7	37	28	+9	1	32	Promotion play-offs
5	Guerreros La Cruz	18	9	3	6	34	28	+6	2	32	Promotion play-offs
6	Guerreros Pericúes	18	9	3	6	47	34	+13	1	31	
7	Titanes de Nogales	18	7	3	8	38	47	−9	2	26	
8	Diablos Azules de Guasave	18	4	6	8	30	33	−3	2	20	
9	Héroes de Caborca	18	1	4	13	22	55	−33	2	9	
10	Pelicanos de Puerto Peñasco	18	0	2	16	21	67	−46	0	2	

Source: Tercera División FMF

== Group 14 ==
Group with 9 teams from Chihuahua, Coahuila and Durango.

=== Teams ===
Location of teams in the 2015–16 3ra División Group 13

Team	City	Home ground	Capacity	Affiliate	Official name
Atlético Gómez Palacio	Gómez Palacio, Durango	Unidad Deportiva Francisco Gómez Palacio	4,000	–	–
Chinarras de Aldama	Aldama, Chihuahua	Ciudad Deportiva Chihuahua	4,000	–	–
Constructores de Gómez Palacio	Gómez Palacio, Durango	Unidad Deportiva Francisco Gómez Palacio	4,000	–	–
La Tribu de Ciudad Juárez	Ciudad Juárez, Chihuahua	20 de Noviembre	2,500	–	–
Meloneros de Matamoros	Matamoros, Coahuila	Unidad Deportiva Creación	1,000	–	–
Real Magari	Ciudad Juárez, Chihuahua	20 de Noviembre	2,500	–	–
Soles de Ciudad Juárez	Ciudad Juárez, Chihuahua	20 de Noviembre	2,500	–	–
Toros	Torreón, Coahuila	Unidad Deportiva Torreón	1,000	–	–
UACH	Chihuahua City, Chihuahua	Olímpico Universitario José Reyes Baeza	22,000	UACH	–

=== League table ===
Pos	Team	Pld	W	D	L	GF	GA	GD	BP	Pts	Qualification or relegation
1	Constructores de Gómez Palacio	16	10	6	0	33	9	+24	2	38	Promotion play-offs
2	UACH	16	11	2	3	32	9	+23	1	36	Reserve Teams play-offs
3	Real Magari	16	8	5	3	24	16	+8	3	32	Promotion play-offs
4	Soles de Ciudad Juárez	16	8	4	4	39	13	+26	3	31	Promotion play-offs
5	La Tribu de Ciudad Juárez	16	6	4	6	24	14	+10	3	25	Promotion play-offs
6	Meloneros de Matamoros	16	4	4	8	21	26	−5	2	18	
7	Toros	16	3	6	7	13	26	−13	1	16	
8	Chinarras de Aldama	16	4	1	11	16	43	−27	1	14	
9	Atlético Gómez Palacio	16	1	2	13	9	55	−46	1	6	

Source: Tercera División FMF

== Promotion play-offs ==
=== Round of 64 ===
Team 1	Agg.	Team 2	1st leg	2nd leg
Corsarios de Campeche	3–5	Yalmakán	0–3	3–2
Deportiva Venados	4–2	Campeche	1–0	3–2
Cruz Azul Lagunas	5–5 (2–4)	(p.) Atlético Acayucan	1–5	4–0
Jiquipilas Valle Verde	10–3	Piñeros de Loma Bonita	4–0	6–3
Hidalguense	5–2	Álamos	3–1	2–1
Cefor Cuauhtémoc Blanco	3–2	Jilotepec	1–2	2–0
Potros UAEM (p.)	4–4 (3–1)	Académicos UGM	0–2	4–2
Universidad del Fútbol	1–2	SEP Puebla	0–1	1–1
Selva Cañera	2–9	Tigrillos Dorados MRCI	0–5	2–4
Chilpancingo	3–2	Albinegros de Orizaba	1–1	2–1
Atlético de Madrid	2–5	Gladiadores Calentanos	0–3	2–2
Marina (p.)	3–3 (4–2)	Sporting Canamy	1–1	2–2
Águilas UAGro	3–2	Ángeles de la Ciudad	1–1	2–1
Alto Rendimiento Tuzo	7–0	Azules de la Sección 26	3–0	4–0
Real Leonés	3–2	Buscando un Campeón	1–2	2–0
Salamanca	0–1	Leones Negros UdeG	0–1	0–0
Tecos	3–1	Palmeros	0–1	3–0
Vaqueros	1–2	Tigres Blancos Gestalt	0–0	1–2
Real Aguascalientes (p.)	3–3 (4–3)	Tuzos UAZ	1–0	2–3
Monarcas Morelia	4–3	Mineros de Fresnillo	1–1	3–2
Acatlán (p.)	3–3 (5–4)	Xalisco	2–3	1–0
CDU Uruapan	2–5	Aves Blancas	0–3	2–2
Troyanos UDEM (p.)	1–1 (3–2)	Gavilanes de Matamoros	0–1	1–0
Titanes de Saltillo	7–4	Saltillo Soccer	3–2	4–2
Deportivo Obregón	1–0	Deportivo Ensenada	0–0	1–0
Águilas UAS	8–0	Guerreros La Cruz	4–0	4–0
Constructores de Gómez Palacio	5–5 (7–6)	La Tribu de Ciudad Juárez	1–2	4–3
Soles de Ciudad Juárez (p.)	2–2 (4–2)	Real Magari	1–1	1–1
Escuela de Alto Rendimiento	2–2 (4–5)	Estudiantes de Atlacomulco	1–1	1–1
Nuevos Valores de Ocotlán (p.)	2–2 (3–2)	Cocula	0–2	2–0
Sultanes de Tamazunchale	5–2	Real Olmeca Sport	1–0	4–2
Originales Aguacateros (p.)	5–5 (5–4)	Deportivo Los Altos	2–4	3–1

=== Round of 32 ===
Team 1	Agg.	Team 2	1st leg	2nd leg
Marina	0–1	Yalmakán	0–1	0–0
Chilpancingo	3–2	SEP Puebla	1–1	2–1
Águilas UAGro	1–2	Tigrillos Dorados MRCI	1–2	0–0
Cefor Cuauhtémoc Blanco	3–2	Atlético Acayucan	2–0	1–2
Alto Rendimiento Tuzo	1–0	Estudiantes de Atlacomulco	0–0	1–0
Hidalguense	4–2	Deportiva Venados	1–2	3–0
Jiquipilas Valle Verde (p.)	3–3 (5–3)	Gladiadores Calentanos	0–2	3–1
Potros UAEM	3–3 (3–4)	(p.) Sultanes de Tamazunchale	3–1	0–2
Real Leonés	2–2 (3–4)	(p.) Originales Aguacateros	0–2	2–0
Real Aguascalientes	9–4	Troyanos UDEM	3–2	6–2
Titanes de Saltillo	4–2	Soles de Ciudad Juárez	2–2	2–0
Constructores de Gómez Palacio	1–4	Aves Blancas	0–4	1–0
Leones Negros UdeG (p.)	3–3 (3–0)	Águilas UAS	1–1	2–2
Vaqueros	3–6	Tecos	0–2	3–4
Acatlán	7–4	Deportivo Obregón	4–2	3–2
Monarcas Morelia	4–2	Nuevos Valores de Ocotlán	2–2	2–0

=== Final stage ===
Round of 16
5	Valle Verde	4	4	8
14	Sultanes	2	0	2
9	Cefor Cuauhtémoc Blanco	2	3	5
12	Tigrillos Dorados MRCI	1	2	3
1	AR Tuzo (p.)	0	2	2 (5)
16	Yalmakán	2	0	2 (4)
6	Hidalguense (p.)	1	0	1 (4)
11	SEP Puebla	1	0	1 (3)
7	Real Aguascalientes	1	1	2
8	Tecos	3	1	4
4	Monarcas Morelia	1	2	3
10	Aves Blancas	4	1	5
2	Titanes de Saltillo	3	3	6
15	Originales Aguacateros	0	1	1
3	Acatlán	1	2	3 (3)
13	Leones Negros UdeG (p.)	2	1	3 (4)

Quarter-finals
5	Valle Verde	2	3	5
9	Cefor Cuauhtémoc Blanco	2	0	2
1	AR Tuzo	0	0	0
6	Hidalguense	1	0	1
8	Tecos	2	3	5
10	Aves Blancas	1	5	6
2	Titanes de Saltillo	1	0	1
13	Leones Negros UdeG	3	0	3

Semi-finals
5	Valle Verde	1	4	5
6	Hidalguense	0	0	0
10	Aves Blancas	0	2	2
13	Leones Negros UdeG	3	5	8

Final
5	Valle Verde	2	3	5
13	Leones Negros UdeG	6	0	6

==== Round of 16 ====
Team 1	Agg.	Team 2	1st leg	2nd leg
Jiquipilas Valle Verde	8–2	Sultanes de Tamazunchale	4–2	4–0
Cefor Cuauhtémoc Blanco	5–3	Tigrillos Dorados MRCI	2–1	3–2
Alto Rendimiento Tuzo (p.)	2–2 (5–4)	Yalmakán	0–2	2–0
Hidalguense (p.)	1–1 (4–3)	SEP Puebla	1–1	0–0
Real Aguascalientes	2–4	Tecos	1–3	1–1
Monarcas Morelia	3–5	Aves Blancas	1–4	2–1
Titanes de Saltillo	6–1	Originales Aguacateros	3–0	3–1
Acatlán	3–3 (3–4)	(p.) Leones Negros UdeG	1–2	2–1

===== First leg =====
18 May 2016	SEP Puebla	1–1	Hidalguense	Puebla City
14:00	González 24'	Report	Labra 83'	Stadium: Unidad Deportiva Mario Vázquez Raña; Attendance: 200

18 May 2016	Originales Aguacateros	0–3	Titanes de Saltillo	Uruapan
14:30		Report	García 11'; Romero 57'; Zertuche 63'	Stadium: Unidad Deportiva Hermanos López Rayón; Attendance: 800

18 May 2016	Tigrillos Dorados MRCI	1–2	Cefor Cuauhtémoc Blanco	San Jerónimo Tlacochahuaya
15:00	Manzanares 64'	Report	Gutiérrez 52'; Alatorre 83'	Stadium: Campo Independiente MRCI; Attendance: 300

18 May 2016	Sultanes de Tamazunchale	2–4	Jiquipilas Valle Verde	Tamazunchale
16:00	Mata 45'; Salazar 80'	Report	González 18', 44'; Castillejos 38'; López 81'	Stadium: Deportivo Solidaridad; Attendance: 800

18 May 2016	Tecos	3–1	Real Aguascalientes	Zapopan
19:30	Palomino 43'; Ruvalcaba 84'; Zapata 90'	Report	Rodríguez 82'	Stadium: Estadio Tres de Marzo; Attendance: 300

19 May 2016	Leones Negros UdeG	2–1	Acatlán	Zapopan
11:00	Amador 20', 51'	Report	Carrillo 16'	Stadium: Club Deportivo La Primavera; Attendance: 200

19 May 2016	Yalmakán	2–0	Alto Rendimiento Tuzo	Cancún
15:00	Ruiz 56'; Molina 80'	Report		Stadium: Estadio Cancún 86; Attendance: 300

19 May 2016	Aves Blancas	4–1	Monarcas Morelia	Tepatitlán
18:00	Íñiguez 9'; Ayala 15', 78'; Alcántar 26'	Report	Villalbazo 82'	Stadium: Estadio Corredor Industrial; Attendance: 150

===== Second leg =====
21 May 2016	Hidalguense	0–0 (1–1 agg.) (4–3 p)	SEP Puebla	Pachuca
12:00		Report		Stadium: Club Hidalguense; Attendance: 600

21 May 2016	Cefor Cuauhtémoc Blanco	3–2 (5–3 agg.)	Tigrillos Dorados MRCI	Huauchinango
13:00	Vilchis 29'; Barrera 53', 70'	Report	Castro 17'; Leyva 77'	Stadium: Nido Águila; Attendance: 500

21 May 2016	Titanes de Saltillo	3–1 (6–1 agg.)	Originales Aguacateros	Saltillo
15:00	García 16'; Zertuche 22', 46'	Report	Torres 57'	Stadium: Estadio Olímpico Francisco I. Madero; Attendance: 800

21 May 2016	Real Aguascalientes	1–1 (2–4 agg.)	Tecos	Aguascalientes City
16:00	Martínez 89'	Report	Mares 22'	Stadium: Centro Deportivo Ferrocarrilero Tres Centurias; Attendance: 500

21 May 2016	Jiquipilas Valle Verde	4–0 (8–2 agg.)	Sultanes de Tamazunchale	Jiquipilas
17:00	Estrada 27'; Santos 47'; Castillejos 48'; López 85'	Report		Stadium: Estadio Municipal Richard Ruiz; Attendance: 1,000

22 May 2016	Alto Rendimiento Tuzo	2–0 (2–2 agg.) (5–4 p)	Yalmakán	San Agustín Tlaxiaca
11:00	Zamudio 55'; González 58'	Report		Stadium: Universidad del Fútbol; Attendance: 200

22 May 2016	Acatlán	2–1 (3–3 agg.)	Leones Negros UdeG	Acatlán de Juárez
11:00	Santos 55', 62'	Report	Lomelí 82'	Stadium: Club Juárez; Attendance: 500

22 May 2016	Monarcas Morelia	2–1 (3–5 agg.)	Aves Blancas	Morelia
12:00	Alipio 13'; Chávez 52'	Report	Valadéz 59'	Stadium: Estadio Morelos; Attendance: 1,000

==== Quarter-finals ====
Team 1	Agg.	Team 2	1st leg	2nd leg
Jiquipilas Valle Verde	5–2	Cefor Cuauhtémoc Blanco	2–2	3–0
Alto Rendimiento Tuzo	0–1	Hidalguense	0–1	0–0
Tecos	5–6	Aves Blancas	2–1	3–5
Titanes de Saltillo	1–3	Leones Negros UdeG	1–3	0–0

===== First leg =====
25 May 2016	Leones Negros UdeG	3–1	Titanes de Saltillo	Zapopan
11:00	Amador 7', 9', 77'	Report	García 49'	Stadium: Club Deportivo La Primavera; Attendance: 150

25 May 2016	Cefor Cuauhtémoc Blanco	2–2	Jiquipilas Valle Verde	Huauchinango
15:00	Sosa 46'; Barrera 60'	Report	Castillejos 22'; González 68'	Stadium: Nido Águila; Attendance: 500

26 May 2016	Hidalguense	1–0	Alto Rendimiento Tuzo	Pachuca
17:00	Aparicio 75'	Report		Stadium: Club Hidalguense; Attendance: 200

25 May 2016	Aves Blancas	1–2	Tecos	Tepatitlán
18:00	Íñiguez 16'	Report	Suárez 31'; Mares 32'	Stadium: Estadio Corredor Industrial; Attendance: 1,200

===== Second leg =====
28 May 2016	Titanes de Saltillo	0–0 (1–3 agg.)	Leones Negros UdeG	Saltillo
15:00		Report		Stadium: Estadio Olímpico Francisco I. Madero; Attendance: 1,000

28 May 2016	Jiquipilas Valle Verde	3–0 (5–2 agg.)	Cefor Cuauhtémoc Blanco	Jiquipilas
17:00	González 49', 76'; López 90'	Report		Stadium: Estadio Municipal Richard Ruiz; Attendance: 2,500

28 May 2016	Tecos	3–5 (5–6 agg.)	Aves Blancas	Zapopan
20:00	Enríquez 5'; Mares 39'; Alonso 90+2'	Report	Limón 16', 47', 64'; Íñiguez 19', 45'	Stadium: Estadio de Tres de Marzo; Attendance: 1,500

29 May 2016	Alto Rendimiento Tuzo	0–0 (0–1 agg.)	Hidalguense	San Agustín Tlaxiaca
11:00		Report		Stadium: Universidad del Fútbol; Attendance: 300

==== Semi-finals ====
Team 1	Agg.	Team 2	1st leg	2nd leg
Jiquipilas Valle Verde	5–0	Hidalguense	1–0	4–0
Aves Blancas	2–8	Leones Negros UdeG	0–3	2–5

===== First leg =====
1 June 2016	Leones Negros UdeG	3–0	Aves Blancas	Zapopan
11:00	Lecourtouis 27'; Ortiz 47'; Amador 60'	Report		Stadium: Club Deportivo La Primavera; Attendance: 200

1 June 2016	Hidalguense	0–1	Jiquipilas Valle Verde	Pachuca
17:00		Report	González 3'	Stadium: Club Hidalguense; Attendance: 700

===== Second leg =====
4 June 2016	Jiquipilas Valle Verde	4–0 (5–0 agg.)	Hidalguense	Jiquipilas
17:00	González 46', 48', 73'; Orozco 62'	Report		Stadium: Estadio Municipal Richard Ruiz; Attendance: 3,000

4 June 2016	Aves Blancas	2–5 (2–8 agg.)	Leones Negros UdeG	Tepatitlán
18:00	Valadéz 52'; Ponce 70'	Report	Ávila 13'; Amador 20', 58'; Baltazar 24'; Sánchez 85'	Stadium: Estadio Corredor Industrial; Attendance: 1,000

==== Final ====
Team 1	Agg.	Team 2	1st leg	2nd leg
Jiquipilas Valle Verde	5–6	Leones Negros UdeG	2–6	3–0

===== First leg =====
8 June 2016	Leones Negros UdeG	6–2	Jiquipilas Valle Verde	Zapopan
11:00	Lecourtouis 3', 23', 71', 79'; Sánchez 56'; Amador 66'	Report	Cabrera 68'; González 88'	Stadium: Club Deportivo La Primavera; Attendance: 1,000

===== Second leg =====
11 June 2016	Jiquipilas Valle Verde	3–0 (5–6 agg.)	Leones Negros UdeG	Jiquipilas
17:00	González 25'; Grajales 30'; Torres 75'	Report		Stadium: Estadio Municipal Richard Ruiz; Attendance: 4,000

2015–2016 winners

1st title

== Reserve Teams ==
=== Table ===
P	Team	Pts	G	Pts/G	GD
1	Mineros de Zacatecas	83	34	2.44	+88
2	Alebrijes de Oaxaca	82	34	2.41	+59
3	Tigres SD	65	28	2.32	+44
4	Atlas	88	38	2.32	+73
5	Guadalajara	87	38	2.29	+71
6	UACH	36	16	2.25	+23
7	Coras	82	38	2.16	+32
8	Poblado Miguel Alemán	38	18	2.11	+13
9	Celaya	67	32	2.09	+38
10	Pumas UNAM	71	34	2.09	+63
11	Correcaminos UAT	55	28	1.96	+33
12	Atlante	46	30	1.530	–8
13	Escuela de Fútbol Chivas	53	38	1.39	+11

Last updated: May 1, 2016
Source: Tercera División
P = Position; G = Games played; Pts = Points; Pts/G = Ratio of points to games played; GD = Goal difference

=== Play-offs ===
Quarter-finals
1	Mineros de Zacatecas	2	1	3
8	Poblado Miguel Alemán	2	0	2
2	Alebrijes de Oaxaca	1	0	1
7	Coras	3	3	6
3	Tigres SD	2	1	3
6	UACH	2	0	2
4	Atlas	1	0	1
5	Guadalajara	1	3	4

Semi-finals
1	Mineros de Zacatecas	2	2	4
7	Coras	2	1	3
3	Tigres SD	1	1	2
5	Guadalajara	0	1	1

Final
1	Mineros de Zacatecas (p.)	1	4	5 (4)
3	Tigres SD	2	3	5 (2)

== See also ==
- Tercera División de México
