= 2017–18 Tercera División de México season =

Tercera División Profesional
- Season: 2017–18
- Dates: 1 September 2017 – 10 June 2018
- Champions: Acatlán (1st title)
- Promoted: Marina
- Top goalscorer: José Ángel Espinoza (45 goals)
- Stats are from the regular season only

The 2017–18 Tercera División season is the fourth-tier football league of Mexico. The tournament began on 1 September 2017 and finished on 10 June 2018.

== Competition format ==
The Tercera División (Third Division) is divided into 13 groups. For the 2009/2010 season, the format of the tournament has been reorganized to a home and away format, which all teams will play in their respective group. The 13 groups consist of teams who are eligible to play in the liguilla de ascenso for one promotion spot, teams who are affiliated with teams in the Liga MX, Ascenso MX and Liga Premier, which are not eligible for promotion but will play that who the better filial team in an eight team filial playoff tournament for the entire season.

The league format allows participating franchises to rent their place to another team, so some clubs compete with a different name than the one registered with the FMF.

== Group 1 ==
Group with 14 teams from Campeche, Chiapas, Quintana Roo, Tabasco and Yucatán.

Location of teams in the 2017–18 3ra División Group 1 (Campeche)
Location of teams in the 2017–18 3ra División Group 1 (Quintana Roo)
Location of teams in the 2017–18 3ra División Group 1 (Chiapas and Tabasco)
Location of teams in the 207–18 3ra División Group 1 (Yucatán)

=== Teams ===
Team	City	Home ground	Capacity	Affiliate
Caimanes de Cancún	Cancún, Quintana Roo	Club Viany	1,000	–
Campeche	Campeche, Campeche	La Muralla de Kin-Ha	500	—
Cantera Venados	Mérida, Yucatán	Carlos Iturralde	15,087	Venados
Carmen	Ciudad del Carmen, Campeche	UNACAR Campus I	1,000	—
Chetumal	Chetumal, Quintana Roo	10 de Abril	5,000	—
Corsarios de Campeche	Campeche, Campeche	Universitario de Campeche	4,000	—
Cozumel Tres Toños	San Miguel de Cozumel, Quintana Roo	Unidad Deportiva Bicentenario	1,000	–
Delfines Márquez	Campeche, Campeche	Francisco Márquez Segovia	500	—
Deportiva Venados	Tamanché, Yucatán	Alonso Diego Molina	2,500	—
Dragones de Tabasco	Villahermosa, Tabasco	Olímpico de Villahermosa	12,000	—
Felinos 48	Reforma, Chiapas	Sergio Lira Gallardo	600	—
Inter Playa del Carmen	Playa del Carmen, Quintana Roo	Unidad Deportiva Mario Villanueva Madrid	7,500	Inter Playa del Carmen
Pioneros Junior	Cancún, Quintana Roo	Cancún 86	6,390	Pioneros de Cancún
Yalmakán	Puerto Morelos, Quintana Roo	Unidad Deportiva Colonia Pescadores	1,200	Yalmakán

=== League table ===
Pos	Team	Pld	W	D	L	GF	GA	GD	Pts	Qualification or relegation
1	Deportiva Venados (Q)	26	18	2	6	60	27	+33	58	Promotion Playoffs
2	Caimanes de Cancún (Q)	26	16	6	4	40	20	+20	58	Promotion Playoffs
3	Campeche (Q)	26	17	4	5	47	27	+20	56	Promotion Playoffs
4	Cantera Venados (Q)	26	13	8	5	46	25	+21	49	Promotion Playoffs
5	Inter Playa del Carmen	26	12	8	6	43	30	+13	48	
6	Cozumel Tres Toños	26	10	8	8	54	30	+24	42	
7	Felinos 48	26	11	4	11	43	44	−1	39	
8	Pioneros Junior	26	8	9	9	37	38	−1	39	
9	Yalmakán	26	9	7	10	29	24	+5	38	
10	Chetumal	26	11	3	12	37	33	+4	37	
11	Corsarios de Campeche	26	7	7	12	36	40	−4	30	
12	Carmen	26	5	8	13	27	46	−19	28	
13	Dragones de Tabasco	26	4	4	18	17	58	−41	19	
14	Delfines Márquez	26	1	2	23	21	95	−74	5	

Source: 3a División
(Q) Qualified for the phase indicated

== Group 2 ==
Group with 18 teams from Hidalgo, Puebla, San Luis Potosí, Tlaxcala and Veracruz.

=== Teams ===
Location of teams in the 2017–18 3ra División Group 2

Team	City	Home ground	Capacity	Affiliate	Official Name
Académicos UGM	Orizaba, Veracruz	Universitario UGM Orizaba	1,500	—	—
Albinegros de Orizaba	Orizaba, Veracruz	UGM Nogales	1,500	Albinegros de Orizaba	—
Alpha	Puebla, Puebla	Club Alpha Cancha 3	600	—	—
Atlético Huejutla	Huejutla, Hidalgo	Carlos Fayad	1,000	–	–
Camelia	Zacatlán, Puebla	Morelos	1,000	—	—
Chileros XL	Xalapa, Veracruz	Complejo Omega	1,000	—	—
Delfines UGM	Nogales, Veracruz	UGM Nogales	1,500	—	—
Héroes de Veracruz	Zacatlán, Puebla	Morelos	1,000	–	–
Lobos Chapultepec SAI	Puebla, Puebla	Club Alpha Cancha 3	600	—	Club Puebla SAI
Los Ángeles	Puebla, Puebla	Ex Hacienda San José Maravillas	500	—	—
Los Olivos LMT	San Francisco Totimehuacán, Puebla	Complejo Deportivo Los Olivos	1,000	–	Limoneros de Futbol
Petroleros de Poza Rica	Poza Rica, Veracruz	Heriberto Jara Corona	10,000	—	—
Real Xalapa	Rafael Lucio, Veracruz	Rosario M. Torres	1,000	–	Real San Cosme
Reales de Puebla	Chachapa, Puebla	Unidad Deportiva Chachapa	1,000	—	—
SEP Puebla	Puebla, Puebla	Centro Estatal del Deporte Mario Vázquez Raña	800	Puebla	—
Star Club	Santa Ana Nopalucan, Tlaxcala	U.D. Santa Ana Nopalucan	500	—	—
Sultanes de Tamazunchale	Tamazunchale, San Luis Potosí	Deportivo Solidaridad	1,650	—	—
Tehuacán	Tehuacán, Puebla	Polideportivo La Huizachera	1,000	—	—

=== League table ===
Pos	Team	Pld	W	D	L	GF	GA	GD	Pts	Qualification or relegation
1	Albinegros de Orizaba (Q)	34	22	7	5	96	31	+65	76	Promotion Playoffs
2	Sultanes de Tamazunchale (Q)	34	24	2	8	80	37	+43	76	Promotion Playoffs
3	Académicos UGM (Q)	34	21	7	6	78	26	+52	73	Promotion Playoffs
4	Alpha (Q)	34	19	9	6	81	42	+39	72	Promotion Playoffs
5	Delfines UGM (Q)	34	20	7	7	77	34	+43	72	Promotion Playoffs
6	Petroleros de Poza Rica (Q)	34	18	8	8	87	55	+32	67	Promotion Playoffs
7	Real Xalapa	34	17	7	10	67	54	+13	60	
8	SEP Puebla	34	14	9	11	57	52	+5	52	
9	Lobos Chapultepec SAI	34	11	12	11	58	48	+10	51	
10	Camelia	34	12	11	11	61	58	+3	51	
11	Los Ángeles	34	12	8	14	66	56	+10	48	
12	Star Club	34	10	5	19	58	77	−19	39	
13	Tehuacán	34	9	9	16	37	60	−23	38	
14	Reales de Puebla	34	10	5	19	74	103	−29	38	
15	Héroes de Veracruz	34	7	5	22	43	104	−61	30	
16	Atlético Huejutla	34	6	5	23	26	90	−64	26	
17	Chileros XL	34	6	5	23	30	93	−63	24	
18	Los Olivos LMT	34	5	5	24	44	100	−56	23	

Source: 3a División
(Q) Qualified for the phase indicated

== Group 3 ==
Group with 16 teams from Chiapas, Oaxaca and Veracruz.

=== Teams ===
Location of teams in the 2017–18 3ra División Group 3 (Chiapas)
Location of teams in the 2017–18 3ra División Group 3 (Oaxaca and Veracruz)

Team	City	Home ground	Capacity	Affiliate	Official name
Atlético Boca del Río	Boca del Río, Veracruz	Unidad Deportiva Hugo Sánchez	2,500	—	–
Atlético Ixtepec	Ixtepec, Oaxaca	Brena Torres	1,000	—	–
Caballeros de Córdoba	Córdoba, Veracruz	Rafael Murillo Vidal	3,800	—	Santos Córdoba
Cafetaleros de Tapachula	Tapachula, Chiapas	Olímpico de Tapachula	18,017	Cafetaleros de Tapachula	–
Conejos de Tuxtepec	Tuxtepec, Oaxaca	Ing. Guillermo Hernández Castro	4,000	—	–
Córdoba	Córdoba, Veracruz	Rafael Murillo Vidal	3,800	—	Colegio Once México
Cruz Azul Lagunas	Lagunas, Oaxaca	Cruz Azul	1,000	Cruz Azul	–
Guardianes de Balam	Cintalapa, Chiapas	Francisco Zabaleta Palacios	3,000	–	Futcenter
Halcones Marinos de Veracruz	Boca del Río, Veracruz	Unidad Deportiva Hugo Sánchez	1,500	—	–
Milenarios de Oaxaca	Oaxaca City, Oaxaca	Deportivo Ramos	1,000	–	Alacranes Rojos de Apatzingán
Piñeros de Loma Bonita	Loma Bonita, Oaxaca	20 de Noviembre	1,000	–	–
Porteños	Salina Cruz, Oaxaca	Heriberto Kehoe Vincent	2,000	—	–
Sozca	Lerdo de Tejada, Veracruz	Miguel Seoane Lavín	1,000	—	–
Tehuantepec	Tehuantepec, Oaxaca	Unidad Deportiva Guiengola	5,000	—	Real Pueblo Nuevo
Tigrillos Dorados MRCI	San Jerónimo Tlacochahuaya, Oaxaca	Microestadio ITO / Independiente MRCI	1,000/ 3,000	Chapulineros de Oaxaca	–
Toros Huatusco	Huatusco, Veracruz	Unidad Deportiva Centenario	1,000	–	–

=== League table ===
Pos	Team	Pld	W	D	L	GF	GA	GD	Pts	Qualification or relegation
1	Tigrillos Dorados MRCI (Q)	30	20	10	0	62	22	+40	74	Promotion Playoffs
2	Córdoba (Q)	30	21	4	5	53	24	+29	70	Promotion Playoffs
3	Caballeros de Córdoba (Q)	30	18	6	6	42	26	+16	65	Promotion Playoffs
4	Guardianes de Balam (Q)	30	15	9	6	63	25	+38	61	Promotion Playoffs
5	Cruz Azul Lagunas (Q)	30	15	10	5	57	33	+24	58	Promotion Playoffs
6	Atlético Boca del Río (Q)	30	13	8	9	46	44	+2	51	Promotion Playoffs
7	Conejos de Tuxtepec	30	12	9	9	67	43	+24	48	
8	Cafetaleros de Tapachula	30	11	8	11	52	43	+9	46	
9	Sozca	30	13	4	13	51	41	+10	44	
10	Toros Huatusco	30	8	12	10	44	49	−5	40	
11	Porteños	30	6	13	11	31	41	−10	40	
12	Milenarios de Oaxaca	30	6	9	15	33	56	−23	30	
13	Atlético Ixtepec	30	7	5	18	28	54	−26	30	
14	Halcones Marinos de Veracruz	30	4	8	18	34	67	−33	23	
15	Tehuantepec	30	5	5	20	30	78	−48	22	
16	Piñeros de Loma Bonita	30	3	6	21	18	65	−47	17	

Source: 3a División
(Q) Qualified for the phase indicated

== Group 4 ==
Group with 18 teams from Greater Mexico City.

=== Teams ===
Location of teams in the 2017–18 3ra División Group 4

Team	City	Home ground	Capacity	Affiliate	Official name
Águilas de Teotihuacán	Teotihuacán, State of Mexico	Municipal Teotihuacán	1,200	–	–
Álamos	Venustiano Carranza, Mexico City	Magdalena Mixhuca Sports City	500	–	–
Ángeles de la Ciudad	Iztacalco, Mexico City	Deportivo Rosario Iglesias	6,000	–	–
Atlante	Tultitlán, State of Mexico	Nuevo Territorio Azulgrana	500	Atlante	–
Atlético Estado de México	Cuautitlán Izcalli, State of México	Hugo Sánchez Márquez	3,500	–	–
Azules de la Sección 26	Gustavo A. Madero, Mexico City	Deportivo Francisco Zarco	500	Pachuca	–
Cafetaleros FORMAFUTINTEGRAL	Ixtapaluca, State of Mexico	Unidad Deportiva La Antorcha	2,300	Cafetaleros de Tapachula	–
Cefor Canamy	Xochimilco, Mexico City	Valentín González	5,000	Sporting Canamy	Tulyehualco
Chivas SDC	Tultitlán, State of Mexico	Cancha Nou Camp	1,000	Guadalajara	Morelos Ecatepec
Halcones Zúñiga	Miguel Hidalgo, Mexico City	Hugo Sánchez Portugal	1,000	–	–
Leopardos	Iztapalapa, Mexico City	Leandro Valle	1,500	–	–
Marina	Xochimilco, Mexico City	Valentín González	5,000	–	–
Novillos Neza	Iztacalco, Mexico City	Magdalena Mixhuca Sports City	500	–	–
Politécnico	Venustiano Carranza, Mexico City	Deportivo Plutarco Elías Calles	2,500	–	–
Proyecto Nuevo Chimalhuacán	Chimalhuacán, State of Mexico	Deportivo La Laguna	2,000	Nuevo Chimalhuacán	–
Pumas UNAM	Coyoacán, Mexico City	La Cantera	2,000	UNAM	–
San José del Arenal	Chalco, State of Mexico	Arreola	2,500	–	–
Unión Magdalena Contreras	Magdalena Contreras, Mexico City	Deportivo Casa Popular	1,000	–	–

=== League table ===
Pos	Team	Pld	W	D	L	GF	GA	GD	Pts	Qualification or relegation
1	Marina (Q)	34	28	5	1	92	13	+79	92	Promotion Playoffs
2	Cefor Canamy (Q)	34	27	3	4	121	30	+91	85	Promotion Playoffs
3	Pumas UNAM (Q)	34	20	8	6	74	25	+49	74	Reserve teams Playoffs
4	Atlético Estado de México (Q)	34	20	7	7	58	22	+36	71	Promotion Playoffs
5	Ángeles de Ciudad (Q)	34	18	9	7	61	39	+22	65	Promotion Playoffs
6	Proyecto Nuevo Chimalhuacán (Q)	34	16	8	10	46	37	+9	61	Promotion Playoffs
7	Azules de la Sección 26 (Q)	34	15	8	11	68	51	+17	59	Promotion Playoffs
8	Unión Magdalena Contreras	34	16	6	12	58	33	+25	56	
9	Atlante	34	14	11	9	66	49	+17	56	
10	Cafetaleros FORMAFUTINTEGRAL	34	14	6	14	61	44	+17	52	
11	San José del Arenal	34	14	6	14	58	54	+4	49	
12	Chivas SDC	34	9	7	18	42	60	−18	39	
13	Leopardos	34	7	9	18	36	63	−27	36	
14	Álamos	34	8	8	18	28	72	−44	35	
15	Politécnico	34	6	10	18	23	62	−39	33	
16	Águilas de Teotihuacán	34	7	8	19	38	57	−19	32	
17	Halcones Zúñiga	34	3	3	28	14	117	−103	14	
18	Novillos Neza	34	1	4	29	15	131	−116	8	

Source: 3a División
(Q) Qualified for the phase indicated

== Group 5 ==
Group with 17 teams from Mexico City and State of Mexico.

Location of teams in the 2017–18 3ra División Group 5

=== Teams ===
Team	City	Home ground	Capacity	Affiliate	Official name
Alebrijes de Oaxaca	Huixquilucan, State of Mexico	Alberto Pérez Navarro	3,000	Alebrijes de Oaxaca	–
Calimaya	Calimaya, State of Mexico	Unidad Deportiva Emilio Chuayffet	1,000	–	–
Cefor Chaco Giménez	Nicolás Romero, State of Mexico	La Colmena	1,000	–	–
Diablos Valle de Bravo	Valle de Bravo, State of Mexico	Unidad Deportiva Monte Alto	1,000	Toluca	Deportivo Vallesano FC
Escuela de Alto Rendimiento	Huixquilucan de Degollado, State of Mexico	Universidad Anáhuac México Norte	300	Santos Laguna	–
Estudiantes de Atlacomulco	Atlacomulco, State of Mexico	Ignacio Pichardo Pagaza	2,000	–	–
Frailes Homape	Xochimilco, Mexico City	San Isidro	3,000	–	–
Fuerza Mazahua	Ixtlahuaca, State of Mexico	Municipal de Ixtlahuaca	1,000	–	–
Halcones de Rayón	Rayón, State of Mexico	Unidad Deportiva Dionicio Cerón	1,800	–	–
Histeria	Metepec, State of Mexico	Cancha Arqueros F.C.	1,000	–	–
Jilotepec	Jilotepec, State of Mexico	Rubén Chávez Chávez	2,000	–	–
Leones de Lomar	Iztacalco, Mexico City	Deportivo San Pedro	1,500	–	–
Metepec	Metepec, State of Mexico	Unidad Deportiva Alarcón Hisojo	500	–	–
Potros UAEM	Toluca, State of Mexico	Alberto "Chivo" Córdoba	32,603	Potros UAEM	–
Promotora Cuemanco	Iztapalapa, State of Mexico	Deportivo Francisco I. Madero	1,000	–	Aztecas AMF Soccer
Santa Rosa	Venustiano Carranza, Mexico City	Deportivo Plutarco Elías Calles	1,000	–	–
Tejupilco	Tejupilco, State of Mexico	Unidad Deportiva Tejupilco	1,000	–	–

=== League table ===
Pos	Team	Pld	W	D	L	GF	GA	GD	Pts	Qualification or relegation
1	Diablos Valle de Bravo (Q)	32	22	6	4	61	17	+44	77	Promotion Playoffs
2	Potros UAEM (Q)	32	19	11	2	84	16	+68	74	Promotion Playoffs
3	Alebrijes de Oaxaca (Q)	32	19	9	4	56	24	+32	72	Reserve teams Playoffs
4	Fuerza Mazahua (Q)	32	16	10	6	46	16	+30	63	Promotion Playoffs
5	Metepec (Q)	32	16	7	9	59	33	+26	60	Promotion Playoffs
6	Tejupilco (Q)	32	16	6	10	50	38	+12	58	Promotion Playoffs
7	Halcones de Rayón (Q)	32	11	14	7	33	23	+10	55	Promotion Playoffs
8	Histeria	32	14	7	11	47	33	+14	54	
9	Estudiantes de Atlacomulco	32	14	8	10	44	34	+10	52	
10	Escuela de Alto Rendimiento	32	14	6	12	44	36	+8	48	
11	Jilotepec	32	11	10	11	38	39	−1	46	
12	Calimaya	32	8	10	14	31	41	−10	39	
13	Santa Rosa	32	4	10	18	27	56	−29	27	
14	Frailes Homape	32	6	6	20	27	75	−48	26	
15	Promotora Cuemanco	32	5	8	19	29	69	−40	25	
16	Cefor Chaco Giménez	32	7	2	23	23	73	−50	25	
17	Leones de Lomar	32	3	4	25	21	97	−76	15	

Source: 3a División
(Q) Qualified for the phase indicated

== Group 6 ==
Group with 8 teams from Guerrero and Morelos.

=== Teams ===
Location of teams in the 2017–18 3ra División Group 6 (Morelos)
Location of teams in the 2017–18 3ra División Group 6 (Guerrero)

Team	City	Home ground	Capacity	Affiliate
Acapulco	Acapulco, Guerrero	Hugo Sánchez	6,000	–
Águilas UAGro	Chilpancingo, Guerrero	Andrés Figueroa	2,000	–
Atlético Cuernavaca	Cuernavaca, Morelos	Mariano Matamoros	16,000	–
Chilpancingo	Chilpancingo, Guerrero	David Josué García Evangelista	1,000	–
Iguala	Iguala, Guerrero	Unidad Deportiva Iguala	1,000	–
JFS Yautepec	Yautepec, Morelos	Unidad Deportiva San Carlos	1,000	–
Real Victoria	Acapulco, Guerrero	Unidad Deportiva Acapulco	13,000	–
Selva Cañera	Emiliano Zapata, Morelos	General Emiliano Zapata	1,000	–

=== League table ===
Pos	Team	Pld	W	D	L	GF	GA	GD	Pts	Qualification or relegation
1	Águilas UAGro (Q)	28	19	4	5	104	34	+70	61	Promotion Playoffs
2	Selva Cañera (Q)	28	18	5	5	68	23	+45	61	Promotion Playoffs
3	Iguala (Q)	28	15	6	7	73	41	+32	56	Promotion Playoffs
4	Chilpancingo (Q)	28	15	7	6	56	22	+34	55	Promotion Playoffs
5	Atlético Cuernavaca	28	12	7	9	64	42	+22	49	
6	Acapulco	28	8	7	13	41	51	−10	33	
7	Real Victoria	28	5	1	22	34	88	−54	16	
8	JFS Yautepec	28	1	1	26	20	159	−139	5	

Source: 3a División
(Q) Qualified for the phase indicated

== Group 7 ==
Group with 16 teams from Hidalgo, Mexico City and Puebla.

=== Teams ===
Location of teams in the 2017–18 3ra División Group 7 (Hidalgo and Puebla)
Location of teams in the 2017–18 3ra División Group 7 (State of Mexico)

Team	City	Home ground	Capacity	Affiliate	Official name
Atlético San Juan de Aragón	Tultitlán, State of Mexico	Deportivo Cartagena	500	–	–
CEFOR Cuauhtémoc Blanco	Huauchinango, Puebla	Nido Águila Huauchinango	300	–	–
CH Fútbol Club	Pachuca, Hidalgo	Club Hidalguense	600	–	–
Cuervos Blancos	Cuautitlán, State of Mexico	Los Pinos	5,000	–	–
Faraones de Texcoco	Texcoco, State of Mexico	Claudio Suárez	4,000	–	–
Halcones del Valle del Mezquital	Teotihuacán, State of Mexico	Deportivo Braulio Romero	1,200	–	–
Hidalguense	Pachuca, Hidalgo	Club Hidalguense	600	–	–
Independiente Mexiquense	Huehuetoca, State of Mexico	12 de Mayo	1,500	–	–
Pato Baeza	Texcoco, State of Mexico	Centro de Fútbol Pato Baeza	1,000	–	–
Promodep Central	Cuautitlán, State of Mexico	Los Pinos	5,000	–	–
Santiago Tulantepec	Tulancingo, Hidalgo	Primero de Mayo	2,500	–	–
Sk Sport Street Soccer	Tulancingo, Hidalgo	Unidad Deportiva Javier Rojo Gómez	2,000	–	–
Texcoco	Papalotla, State of Mexico	Unidad Deportiva Silverio Pérez	1,000	–	–
Tuzos Pachuca	San Agustín Tlaxiaca, Hidalgo	Universidad del Fútbol	1,000	Pachuca	–
Unión Acolman	Acolman, State of Mexico	San Carlos Tepexpan	1,200	–	–
Universidad del Fútbol	San Agustín Tlaxiaca, Hidalgo	Universidad del Fútbol	1,000	Pachuca	–

=== League table ===
Pos	Team	Pld	W	D	L	GF	GA	GD	Pts	Qualification or relegation
1	Pachuca (Q)	30	26	2	2	112	19	+93	82	Promotion Playoffs
2	Hidalguense (Q)	30	20	7	3	81	25	+56	73	Promotion Playoffs
3	Faraones de Texcoco (Q)	30	18	7	5	71	20	+51	66	Promotion Playoffs
4	Universidad del Fútbol	30	18	5	7	52	26	+26	62	
5	Unión Acolman (Q)	30	18	5	7	75	37	+38	60	Promotion Playoffs
6	CEFOR Cuauhtémoc Blanco (Q)	30	17	4	9	80	32	+48	58	Promotion Playoffs
7	Independiente Mexiquense (Q)	30	13	7	10	62	60	+2	49	Promotion Playoffs
8	Promodep Central	30	12	7	11	43	52	−9	47	
9	Pato Baeza	30	14	3	13	57	52	+5	46	
10	Santiago Tulantepec	30	11	8	11	43	63	−20	43	
11	Cuervos Blancos	30	9	6	15	40	58	−18	36	
12	Sk Sport Street Soccer	30	8	6	16	49	61	−12	34	
13	Texcoco	30	7	3	20	48	84	−36	24	
14	CH Fútbol Club	30	5	2	23	22	73	−51	18	
15	Halcones del Valle del Mezquital	30	4	2	24	26	79	−53	14	
16	Atlético San Juan de Aragón	30	1	4	25	20	140	−120	8	

Source: 3a División
(Q) Qualified for the phase indicated

== Group 8 ==
Group with 19 teams from Guanajuato, Guerrero, Michoacán and Querétaro. San Juan del Río retired after the Week 19.

=== Teams ===
Location of teams in the 2017–18 3ra División Group 8 (Guanajuato and Querétaro)
Location of teams in the 2017–18 3ra División Group 8 (Michoacán and Guerrero)

Team	City	Home ground	Capacity	Affiliate	Official name
Atlético Tonalá	Comonfort, Guanajuato	Complejo Deportivo Brígido Vargas	1,000	–	–
Atlético Valladolid	Morelia, Michoacán	Venustiano Carranza	22,000	–	–
Brujos de Juventino Rosas	Santa Cruz de Juventino Rosas, Guanajuato	Unidad Deportiva Sur	1,000	–	Real Halcones
Celaya	Celaya, Guanajuato	Instituto Tecnológico Celaya	1,000	Celaya	–
Cocodrilos de Lázaro Cárdenas	Lázaro Cárdenas, Michoacán	Club Pacífico	2,500	–	–
Delfines de Abasolo	Abasolo, Guanajuato	Municipal de Abasolo	2,500	–	–
Guerreros Zacapu	Zacapu, Michoacán	Municipal Zacapu	2,500	–	Monarcas Zacapu
Iguanas	Zihuatanejo, Guerrero	Unidad Deportiva Zihuatanejo	1,000	–	–
Libertadores	Santa Catarina, Guanajuato	Unidad Deportiva Santa Catarina	1,000	–	–
Originales Aguacateros	Uruapan, Michoacán	Unidad Deportiva Hermanos López Rayón	5,000	–	–
Querétaro	Querétaro, Querétaro	Parque Bicentenario	1,000	Querétaro	–
Queseros de San José	San José de Gracia, Michoacán	Juanito Chávez	1,500	–	–
Real Querétaro	Huimilpan, Querétaro	Peña Madridista Emilio Butragueño	1,000	–	–
La Piedad	La Piedad, Michoacán	Juan N. López	13,356	La Piedad	–
Sahuayo	Sahuayo, Michoacán	Unidad Deportiva Municipal	1,500	Sahuayo	–
Salamanca	Salamanca, Guanajuato	El Molinito	2,500	–	–
San Juan del Río	San Juan del Río, Querétaro	Unidad Deportiva Norte	1,000	–	–
CDU Uruapan	Uruapan, Michoacán	Unidad Deportiva Hermanos López Rayón	5,000	–	–
Valle de Santiago	Valle de Santiago, Guanajuato	Camémbaro	1,000	–	Jaral del Progreso F.C.

=== League table ===
Pos	Team	Pld	W	D	L	GF	GA	GD	Pts	Qualification or relegation
1	CDU Uruapan (Q)	34	24	6	4	117	31	+86	83	Promotion Playoffs
2	Atlético Valladolid (Q)	34	24	6	4	81	33	+48	82	Promotion Playoffs
3	Cocodrilos de Lázaro Cárdenas (Q)	34	23	4	7	75	34	+41	73	Promotion Playoffs
4	Salamanca (Q)	34	21	7	6	78	39	+39	73	Promotion Playoffs
5	Celaya	34	16	8	10	63	45	+18	62	
6	Guerreros Zacapu (Q)	34	14	12	8	58	40	+18	61	Promotion Playoffs
7	Originales Aguacateros de Uruapan (Q)	34	15	10	9	48	30	+18	60	Promotion Playoffs
8	La Piedad	34	15	9	10	73	51	+22	59	
9	Sahuayo	34	14	10	10	56	39	+17	58	
10	Valle de Santiago	34	14	8	12	58	48	+10	52	
11	Delfines de Abasolo	34	12	5	17	54	83	−29	44	
12	Libertadores	34	11	7	16	47	60	−13	41	
13	Querétaro	34	10	7	17	41	50	−9	40	
14	Atlético Tonalá	34	9	9	16	40	67	−27	40	
15	Iguanas	34	8	4	22	30	74	−44	30	
16	Real Querétaro	34	6	5	23	30	70	−40	27	
17	Brujos de Juventino Rosas	34	6	7	21	29	71	−42	27	
18	Queseros de San José	34	1	2	31	7	120	−113	6	

Source: 3a División
(Q) Qualified for the phase indicated

== Group 9 ==
Group with 20 teams from Aguascalientes, Guanajuato, Jalisco, San Luis Potosí and Zacatecas.

=== Teams ===
Location of teams in the 2017–18 3ra División Group 9 (Guanajuato)
Location of teams in the 2017–18 3ra División Group 9 (Aguascalientes, Jalisco, San Luis Potosí and Zacatecas)
Location of teams in the 2018–19 Liga TDP Group 9 (Ebano, SLP)

Team	City	Home ground	Capacity	Affiliate	Official name
Alcaldes de Lagos	Purísima del Rincón, Guanajuato	Unidad Deportiva Independencia	2,000	–	–
Armadillos de Ébano	Ebano, San Luis Potosí	Instituto Tecnológico de Ébano	1,000	–	–
Atlético ECCA	León, Guanajuato	CODE Las Joyas	1,000	–	–
Atlético Leonés	Ojuelos de Jalisco, Jalisco	Unidad Deportiva Ojuelos	1,000	–	–
Atlético Ojocaliente	Ojocaliente, Zacatecas	Unidad Deportiva Ojocaliente	1,000	–	FC Zacatecas
Atlético San Francisco	San Francisco del Rincón, Guanajuato	Domingo Velázquez	3,500	–	–
Atlético San Luis	San Luis Potosí, San Luis Potosí	Complejo Deportivo La Presa	2,000	Atlético San Luis	–
Cabezas Rojas	León, Guanajuato	CODE Las Joyas	1,000	–	–
Frailes de Jerez	Jerez, Zacatecas	Unidad Deportiva Jerez	1,000	–	Lobos de Zihuatanejo
León Independiente	León, Guanajuato	CODE Las Joyas	1,000	–	–
Mineros de Fresnillo	Fresnillo, Zacatecas	Minera Fresnillo	6,000	Mineros de Fresnillo	–
Mineros de Zacatecas	Guadalupe, Zacatecas	Unidad Deportiva Guadalupe	500	Mineros de Zacatecas	–
Real Aguascalientes	Aguascalientes, Aguascalientes	Centro Deportivo Ferrocarrilero Tres Centurias	1,000	–	–
Real Magari	Lagos de Moreno, Jalisco	Club Somnus	2,000	–	–
Real Olmeca Colotlán	Colotlán, Jalisco	Centenario de la Constitución Mexicana	2,000	–	–
Tancredi	Aguascalientes, Aguascalientes	Centro Deportivo Ferrocarrilero Tres Centurias	1,000	–	Atlético La Mina
Tlajomulco	Pénjamo, Guanajuato	Pablo Herrera	1,000	–	–
Tuzos UAZ	Zacatecas, Zacatecas	Universitario Unidad Deportiva Norte	5,000	Tuzos UAZ	–
UdeG Lagos de Moreno	Lagos de Moreno, Jalisco	JFV	1,000	Leones Negros UdeG	–
Unión León	León, Guanajuato	Club Empress	500	–	–

=== League table ===
Pos	Team	Pld	W	D	L	GF	GA	GD	Pts	Qualification or relegation
1	Mineros de Zacatecas (Q)	38	26	5	7	108	41	+67	88	Reserve teams Playoffs
2	Tuzos UAZ (Q)	38	23	11	4	75	29	+46	87	Promotion Playoffs
3	Atlético San Francisco (Q)	38	25	7	6	128	41	+87	85	Promotion Playoffs
4	Atlético Leonés (Q)	38	23	10	5	100	37	+63	84	Promotion Playoffs
5	Real Aguascalientes (Q)	38	23	9	6	95	43	+52	84	Promotion Playoffs
6	Atlético San Luis (Q)	38	24	8	6	88	35	+53	83	Promotion Playoffs
7	Tancredi (Q)	38	20	7	11	69	55	+14	74	Promotion Playoffs
8	Mineros de Fresnillo	38	21	8	9	87	48	+39	73	
9	UdeG Lagos de Moreno	38	20	7	11	78	64	+14	70	
10	Unión León	38	17	7	14	55	49	+6	61	
11	Atlético ECCA	38	14	7	17	58	58	0	50	
12	Armadillos de Ébano	38	12	8	18	45	73	−28	48	
13	Alcaldes de Lagos	38	15	1	22	69	82	−13	46	
14	Real Magarí	38	11	6	21	66	100	−34	44	
15	Cabezas Rojas	38	11	5	22	54	81	−27	39	
16	Atlético Ojocaliente	38	8	7	23	52	103	−51	34	
17	Real Olmeca Colotlán	38	8	6	24	50	97	−47	32	
18	Frailes de Jerez	38	7	3	28	37	107	−70	26	
19	León Independiente	38	4	4	30	37	123	−86	17	
20	Tlajomulco	38	4	2	32	24	112	−88	15	

Source: 3a División
(Q) Qualified for the phase indicated

== Group 10 ==
Group with 20 teams from Colima and Jalisco. Nuevos Valores de Ocotlán have dissolved in December 2017.

=== Teams ===
Location of teams in the 2017–18 3ra División Group 10

Team	City	Home ground	Capacity	Affiliate	Official name
Acatlán	Acatlán de Juárez, Jalisco	Club Juárez	1,500	–	–
Atlético Tecomán	Tecomán, Colima	Víctor Eduardo Sevilla Torres	2,000	–	–
Aves Blancas	Tepatitlán de Morelos, Jalisco	Corredor Industrial	1,200	–	–
Autlán	Autlán, Jalisco	Unidad Deportiva Chapultepec	1,500	–	Fut-Car
CAFESSA	Tlajomulco de Zúñiga, Jalisco	Unidad Deportiva Mariano Otero	3,000	CAFESSA	–
CEFO ALR	Zapopan, Jalisco	Tres de Marzo	18,779	Tecos	–
Charales de Chapala	Chapala, Jalisco	Municipal Juan Rayo	1,000	–	
Deportivo Salcido	Ocotlán, Jalisco	Complejo Salcido	1,000	–	–
Escuela de Fútbol Chivas	Zapopan, Jalisco	Verde Valle	800	Guadalajara	–
Leones Negros UdeG	Zapopan, Jalisco	La Primavera	3,000	Leones Negros UdeG	–
Lobos de Zacoalco	Zacoalco de Torres, Jalisco	Campo Uribe Valencia	1,000	–	Gallos Hidrocálidos de Aguascalientes
Nuevos Valores de Ocotlán	Ocotlán, Jalisco	Municipal Benito Juárez	1,500	Leones Negros UdeG	–
Oro	Zapopan, Jalisco	Club Hacienda Real	1,000	–	–
Palmeros	Colima City, Colima	Colima	12,000	–	Deportivo Colegio Guanajuato
Real Ánimas de Sayula	Sayula, Jalisco	Gustavo Díaz Ordaz	1,000	–	–
Tapatíos Soccer	Guadalajara, Jalisco	Unidad Deportiva Cuauhtémoc	1,000	–	–
Tepatitlán	Tepatitlán de Morelos, Jalisco	Gregorio "Tepa" Gómez	12,500	Tepatitlán	–
Valle del Grullo	Tequila, Jalisco	Unidad Deportiva 24 de Enero	2,000	–	
Tornados Tlaquepaque	Tlaquepaque, Jalisco	San Andrés	2,500	–	Atlético Cocula
Volcanes de Colima	Manzanillo, Colima	Unidad Deportiva 5 de Mayo	3,000	–	

=== League table ===
Pos	Team	Pld	W	D	L	GF	GA	GD	Pts	Qualification or relegation
1	Acatlán (Q)	36	27	5	4	84	23	+61	88	Promotion Playoffs
2	Atlético Tecomán (Q)	36	25	5	6	84	34	+50	85	Promotion Playoffs
3	Leones Negros UdeG (Q)	36	23	8	5	84	30	+54	83	Reserve teams Playoffs
4	Aves Blancas (Q)	36	24	5	7	85	40	+45	80	Promotion Playoffs
5	CAFESSA (Q)	36	20	9	7	72	41	+31	74	Promotion Playoffs
6	Tepatitlán (Q)	36	18	10	8	87	42	+45	69	Promotion Playoffs
7	Palmeros (Q)	36	20	5	11	75	42	+33	68	Promotion Playoffs
8	Charales de Chapala	36	16	9	11	59	43	+16	62	
9	Deportivo Salcido	36	15	6	15	69	63	+6	55	
10	Real Ánimas de Sayula	36	14	5	17	64	60	+4	49	
11	Escuela de Fútbol Chivas	36	11	9	16	48	55	−7	47	
12	Oro	36	10	11	15	46	61	−15	47	
13	Valle del Grullo	36	11	10	15	45	63	−18	47	
14	Autlán	36	11	7	18	48	69	−21	42	
15	Tornados Tlaquepaque	36	9	10	17	57	69	−12	41	
16	Tapatíos Soccer	36	9	7	20	55	59	−4	38	
17	Lobos de Zacoalco	36	4	6	26	25	114	−89	21	
18	CEFO ALR	36	3	6	27	21	90	−69	17	
19	Volcanes de Colima	36	3	4	29	22	132	−110	14	

Source: 3a División
(Q) Qualified for the phase indicated

== Group 11 ==
Group with 18 teams from Jalisco, Nayarit and Sinaloa.

=== Teams ===
Location of teams in the 2017–18 3ra División Group 11 (Jalisco and Nayarit)
Location of teams in the 2017–18 3ra División Group 11 (Sinaloa)

Team	City	Home ground	Capacity	Affiliate	Official name
Águilas UAS	Culiacán, Sinaloa	Universitario UAS	3,500	–	–
Atlético Culiacán	Costa Rica, Sinaloa	Antonio Rosales	1,000	–	–
Camaroneros de Escuinapa	Escuinapa, Sinaloa	Perla Camaronera	1,000	–	–
Cefor Nuevo México	Nuevo México, Jalisco	Club Diablos Tesistán	1,000	–	Picudos F.C.
CEFUT	Jocotepec, Jalisco	Municipal de Jocotepec	2,000	–	–
Diablos Azules de Guasave	Guasave, Sinaloa	Armando "Kory" Leyson	9,000	–	–
Dorados de Sinaloa	Culiacán, Sinaloa	Unidad Deportiva Sagarpa	1,000	Dorados de Sinaloa	–
Gallos Viejos	Zapopan, Jalisco	Deportivo Sindicato de Telefonistas	1,000	–	–
Gorilas de Juanacatlán	Juanacatlán, Jalisco	Club Juanacatlán	500	–	
Guadalajara	Zapopan, Jalisco	Verde Valle	800	Guadalajara	–
Juventud Unida	Zapopan, Jalisco	Deportivo Tlajomulco	1,000	–	–
Mazorqueros	Ciudad Guzmán, Jalisco	Municipal Santa Rosa	3,500	–	–
Nacional Palmac	Guadalajara, Jalisco	Club Deportivo Imperio	1,000	–	–
Sufacen Tepic	Tepic, Nayarit	Club Sufacen Libramiento	500	–	–
Tecos	Zapopan, Jalisco	Tres de Marzo	18,779	Tecos	–
Universidad Cuauhtémoc	Zapopan, Jalisco	Universidad Cuautémoc Guadalajara	500	–	–
Vaqueros	Tlaquepaque, Jalisco	Club Vaqueros Ixtlán	1,000	–	–
Xalisco	Xalisco, Nayarit	Unidad Deportiva Landereñas	500	–	–

=== League table ===
Pos	Team	Pld	W	D	L	GF	GA	GD	Pts	Qualification or relegation
1	Guadalajara	34	21	6	7	75	33	+42	73	
2	Águilas UAS (Q)	34	19	9	6	82	34	+48	72	Promotion Playoffs
3	Xalisco (Q)	34	19	9	6	69	31	+38	71	Promotion Playoffs
4	Universidad Cuauhtémoc (Q)	34	20	6	8	78	44	+34	69	Promotion Playoffs
5	CEFUT (Q)	34	20	5	9	68	47	+21	67	Promotion Playoffs
6	Diablos Azules de Guasave (Q)	34	18	8	8	68	32	+36	65	Promotion Playoffs
7	Gorilas de Juanacatlán (Q)	34	16	9	9	55	35	+20	64	Promotion Playoffs
8	Atlético Culiacán	34	16	9	9	59	47	+12	61	
9	Tecos	34	15	8	11	51	47	+4	57	
10	Sufacen Tepic	34	12	10	12	78	58	+20	52	
11	Dorados de Sinaloa	34	13	8	13	50	42	+8	49	
12	Mazorqueros	34	11	12	11	48	46	+2	48	
13	Juventud Unida	34	9	11	14	39	42	−3	45	
14	Gallos Viejos	34	10	8	16	51	61	−10	44	
15	Camaroneros de Escuinapa	34	7	12	15	33	56	−23	39	
16	Nacional Palmac	34	7	6	21	36	75	−39	29	
17	Vaqueros	34	1	6	27	21	116	−95	10	
18	Cefor Nuevo México	34	1	0	33	12	127	−115	3	

Source: 3a División
(Q) Qualified for the phase indicated

== Group 12 ==
Group with 18 teams from Coahuila, Nuevo León and Tamaulipas. Cinco Estrellas was dissafilliated in December 2017.

=== Teams ===
Location of teams in the 2017–18 3ra División Group 12 (Tamaulipas)
Location of teams in the 2017–18 3ra División Group 12 (Nuevo León)
Location of teams in the 2017–18 3ra División Group 12 (Coahuila)

Team	City	Home ground	Capacity	Affiliate	Official name
Atlético Allende	Piedras Negras, Coahuila	Sección 123	6,000	–	–
Atlético Altamira	Altamira, Tamaulipas	Lázaro Cárdenas	2,500	–	–
Bravos de Nuevo Laredo	Nuevo Laredo, Tamaulipas	Unidad Deportiva Benito Juárez	5,000	–	–
Bucaneros de Matamoros	Matamoros, Tamaulipas	Pedro Salazar Maldonado	3,000	–	–
Cadereyta	Cadereyta, Nuevo León	Alfonso Martínez Domínguez	1,000	–	–
Celestes	Tampico, Tamaulipas	Unidad Deportiva Tampico	1,500	–	–
Cinco Estrellas	Monterrey, Nuevo León	Unidad Deportiva La Talaverna	5,000	–	–
Correcaminos UAT	Ciudad Victoria, Tamaulipas	Universitario Eugenio Alvizo Porras	5,000	Correcaminos UAT	–
FCD Bulls Santiago	Santiago, Nuevo León	El Barrial	570	FC Dallas	Atlético UEFA
Gavilanes de Matamoros	Matamoros, Tamaulipas	El Hogar	22,000	Gavilanes de Matamoros	Ho Gar H Matamoros
Halcones de Saltillo	Saltillo, Coahuila	Olímpico Francisco I. Madero	7,000	–	San Isidro Laguna F.C.
Intocables	Monterrey, Nuevo León	Ciudad Deportiva Monterrey	1,000	–	–
Inter Guadalupe	Guadalupe, Nuevo León	Deportivo Bancario	1,000	–	Plateados de Cerro Azul
Leones Blancos	San Fernando, Tamaulipas	Manuel Cavazos Lerma	1,000	–	–
Saltillo Soccer	Saltillo, Coahuila	Olímpico Francisco I. Madero	7,000	Atlético Saltillo Soccer	–
San Nicolás	San Nicolás de los Garza, Nuevo León	Unidad Deportiva Oriente	1,000	–	–
Tigres SD	General Zuazua, Nuevo León	La Cueva de Zuazua	800	Tigres UANL	–
Troyanos UDEM	San Pedro Garza García, Nuevo León	Universidad de Monterrey	1,000	–	–

=== League table ===
Pos	Team	Pld	W	D	L	GF	GA	GD	Pts	Qualification or relegation
1	Correcaminos UAT (Q)	32	24	5	3	82	29	+53	81	Reserve teams Playoffs
2	Tigres SD (Q)	32	21	10	1	88	25	+63	78	Reserve teams Playoffs
3	Saltillo Soccer (Q)	32	22	4	6	100	27	+73	72	Promotion Playoffs
4	FCD Bulls Santiago (Q)	32	21	3	8	81	43	+38	69	Promotion Playoffs
5	Bucaneros de Matamoros (Q)	32	20	6	6	67	44	+23	68	Promotion Playoffs
6	Celestes (Q)	32	14	12	6	57	36	+21	59	Promotion Playoffs
7	Bravos de Nuevo Laredo (Q)	32	12	11	9	57	40	+17	53	Promotion Playoffs
8	Cadereyta	32	15	5	12	56	47	+9	51	
9	Troyanos UDEM (Q)	32	15	5	12	58	49	+9	50	Promotion Playoffs
10	Intocables	32	13	6	13	42	50	−8	47	
11	Gavilanes de Matamoros	32	11	5	16	53	49	+4	41	
12	San Nicolás	32	8	11	13	40	50	−10	40	
13	Halcones de Saltillo	32	7	5	20	44	76	−32	30	
14	Atlético Altamira	32	8	3	21	43	77	−34	28	
15	Leones Blancos	32	6	7	19	44	80	−36	28	
16	Inter Guadalupe	32	4	3	25	54	110	−56	17	
17	Atlético Allende	32	0	2	30	14	148	−134	2	

Source: 3a División
(Q) Qualified for the phase indicated

== Group 13 ==
Group with 13 teams from Chihuahua, Coahuila, Durango and Sonora.

=== Teams ===
Location of teams in the 2017–18 3ra División Group 13

Team	City	Home ground	Capacity	Affiliate	Official name
Chinarras de Aldama	Aldama, Chihuahua	Ciudad Deportiva Chihuahua	4,000	–	–
Cimarrones de Sonora	Hermosillo, Sonora	Miguel Castro Servín	4,000	Cimarrones de Sonora	–
Cobras Fut Premier	Ciudad Juárez, Chihuahua	20 de Noviembre	2,500	–	–
Durango	Durango City, Durango	Francisco Zarco	18,000	Durango	–
Héroes de Caborca	Caborca, Sonora	Fidencio Hernández	3,000	–	–
Juárez	Ciudad Juárez, Chihuahua	Complejo Entrenamiento Bravo	500	Juárez	–
La Tribu de Ciudad Juárez	Ciudad Juárez, Chihuahua	20 de Noviembre	2,500	–	–
Mazorqueros de Guadalupe Victoria	Guadalupe Victoria, Durango	Municipal Guadalupe Victoria	3,000	–	FC Toros
Soles de Ciudad Juárez	Ciudad Juárez, Chihuahua	20 de Noviembre	2,500	–	–
Tiburones de Puerto Peñasco	Puerto Peñasco, Sonora	Arturo Bravo Herrera	3,000	–	–
Tijuana	Hermosillo, Sonora	Cancha Aarón Gamal Aguirre Fimbres	1,000	Tijuana	–
UACH	Chihuahua City, Chihuahua	Olímpico Universitario José Reyes Baeza	22,000	UACH	–
Victoria	San Pedro de las Colonias, Coahuila	Unidad Deportiva Benito Juárez	1,000	Calor	–

=== League table ===
Pos	Team	Pld	W	D	L	GF	GA	GD	Pts	Qualification or relegation
1	Juárez (Q)	24	20	4	0	82	25	+57	67	Reserve teams Playoffs
2	Tijuana (Q)	24	19	3	2	88	30	+58	63	Reserve teams Playoffs
3	Soles de Ciudad Juárez (Q)	24	13	4	7	61	34	+27	46	Promotion Playoffs
4	Tiburones de Puerto Peñasco (Q)	24	12	7	5	57	34	+23	45	Promotion Playoffs
5	UACH	24	13	4	7	49	39	+10	44	
6	Héroes de Caborca (Q)	24	10	5	9	53	47	+6	38	Promotion Playoffs
7	Durango	24	10	4	10	38	31	+7	35	
8	Cobras Fut Premier (Q)	24	8	5	11	46	44	+2	32	Promotion Playoffs
9	Cimarrones de Sonora	24	9	2	13	41	56	−15	31	
10	Victoria	24	7	5	12	36	45	−9	29	
11	La Tribu de Ciudad Juárez	24	5	9	10	23	36	−13	27	
12	Mazorqueros de Guadalupe Victoria	24	1	3	20	8	86	−78	7	
13	Chinarras de Aldama	24	1	1	22	17	92	−75	4	

Source: 3a División
(Q) Qualified for the phase indicated

== Promotion playoffs ==
The Promotion Playoffs consisted of seven phases. Classify 64 teams, the number varies according to the number of teams in each group, being between three and six clubs per sector. The country will be divided into two zones: South Zone (Groups I to VII) and North Zone (Groups VIII to XIII). Eliminations were held according to the average obtained by each group, being ordered from best to worst by their percentage throughout the season.

=== First round ===
==== South zone ====
Team 1	Agg.	Team 2	1st leg	2nd leg
Albinegros de Orizaba	6–2	Cantera Venados	4–0	2–2
Sultanes de Tamazunchale	2–3	Poza Rica	0–1	2–2
Deportiva Venados	5–1	Delfines UGM	2–1	3–0
Caimanes Cancún	3–6	Alpha	2–3	1–3
Académicos UGM (p.)	2–2 (3–2)	Campeche	2–0	0–2
Pachuca	8–2	Independiente Mexiquense	4–1	4–1
Tigrillos Dorados MRCI	6–1	Atlético Boca del Río	3–1	3–0
Hidalguense	3–2	Cruz Azul Lagunas	0–2	3–0
Cefor Cuauhtémoc Blanco	1–5	Córdoba	0–0	1–5
Faraones de Texcoco	2–3	Unión Acolman	1–1	1–2
Caballeros de Córdoba	2–3	Guardianes de Balam	1–2	1–1
Marina (p.)	2–2 (4–3)	Halcones de Rayón	1–1	1–1
Cefor Canamy (Note: Cefor Canamy advanced to the next round having the best regional coefficient of the season)	3–3 (2–4)	(p.) Azules de la Sección 26	2–2	1–1
Diablos Valle de Bravo	9–1	Proyecto Nuevo Chimalhuacán	3–0	6–1
Potros UAEM (p.)	1–1 (4–2)	Tejupilco	0–0	1–1
Águilas UAGro	5–4	Metepec	3–4	2–0
Selva Cañera	2–6	Ángeles de la Ciudad	0–4	2–2
Iguala	2–3	Fuerza Mazahua	1–2	1–1
Chilpancingo	1–2	Atlético Estado de México	1–1	0–1

==== North zone ====
Team 1	Agg.	Team 2	1st leg	2nd leg
CDU Uruapan	5–1	Originales Aguacateros	4–1	1–0
Atlético Valladolid (p.)	4–4	Guerreros Zacapu	2–3	2–1
Tuzos UAZ (Note: Tuzos UAZ advanced to the next round having the best regional coefficient of the season)	2–3	Tancredi	1–2	1–1
Atlético San Francisco	3–0	Salamanca	2–0	1–0
Atlético Leonés	1–1 (3–4)	(p.) Cocodrilos de Lázaro Cárdenas	0–1	1–0
Real Aguascalientes	2–0	Atlético San Luis	0–0	2–0
Acatlán	4–3	Troyanos UDEM	1–0	3–3
Atlético Tecomán	3–2	Bravos de Nuevo Laredo	2–2	1–0
Saltillo Soccer	6–3	Celestes	2–3	4–0
Aves Blancas	2–1	Palmeros	2–1	0–0
FCD Bulls Santiago	3–4	Tepatitlán	0–1	3–3
Bucaneros de Matamoros	0–5	CAFESSA	0–2	0–3
Águilas UAS	9–1	Cobras Fut Premier	4–0	5–1
Xalisco	3–1	Héroes de Caborca	1–1	2–0
Universidad Cuauhtémoc	6–2	Tiburones de Puerto Peñasco	3–2	3–0
CEFUT	4–3	Gorilas de Juanacatlán	3–1	1–2
Diablos Azules de Guasave (p.)	3–3 (4–2)	Soles de Ciudad Juárez	2–1	1–2

=== Second round ===
==== South zone ====
Team 1	Agg.	Team 2	1st leg	2nd leg
Pachuca	3–2	Cefor Canamy	2–1	1–1
Marina (p.)	4–4 (4–2)	Azules de la Sección 26	1–3	3–1
Tigrillos Dorados MRCI	5–4	Ángeles de la Ciudad	1–2	4–2
Hidalguense (Note: Hidalguense advanced to the next round having the best regional coefficient of the season)	0–3	Fuerza Mazahua	0–2	0–1
Diablos Valle de Bravo	1–2	Poza Rica	0–1	1–1
Córdoba	1–0	Unión Acolman	1–0	0–0
Potros UAEM	2–1	Guerreros de Balam	0–1	2–0
Albinegros de Orizaba	0–0 (4–5)	(p.) Atlético Estado de México	0–0	0–0
Deportiva Venados	2–1	Alpha	1–1	1–0
Águilas UAGro	2–3	Académicos UGM	2–1	0–2

==== North zone ====
Team 1	Agg.	Team 2	1st leg	2nd leg
Acatlán	4–0	Tuzos UAZ	1–0	3–0
CDU Uruapan (p.)	3–3 (4–3)	Diablos Azules de Guasave	1–2	2–1
Atlético Valladolid	4–3	Tepatitlán	2–2	2–1
Atlético Tecomán	2–2 (3–4)	(p.) Tancredi	0–1	2–1
Saltillo Soccer	5–1	CEFUT	3–1	2–0
Atlético San Francisco	1–3	Universidad Cuauhtémoc	1–1	0–2
Aves Blancas	1–1 (4–5)	(p.) CAFESSA	0–0	1–1
Real Aguascalientes (p.)	2–2 (3–0)	Xalisco	0–0	2–2
Cocodrilos de Lázaro Cárdenas	2–4	Águila UAS	1–1	1–3

=== Third round ===
==== South zone ====
Team 1	Agg.	Team 2	1st leg	2nd leg
Pachuca (p.)	2–2 (3–1)	Fuerza Mazahua	1–2	1–0
Marina (Note: Marina advanced to the next round having the best regional coefficient of the season)	2–3	Poza Rica	0–3	2–0
Tigrillos Dorados MRCI	1–0	Atlético Estado de México	0–0	1–0
Córdoba	3–1	Académicos UGM	1–0	2–1
Potros UAEM	1–2	Deportiva Venados	0–0	1–2

===== First leg =====
9 May 2018	Atlético Estado de México	0–0	Tigrillos Dorados MRCI	Cuautitlán Izcalli, State of Mexico
11:00		Report		Stadium: Estadio Hugo Sánchez; Attendance: 100; Referee: Jair de Jesús Alvarado Landín

9 May 2018	Deportiva Venados	0–0	Potros UAEM	Tamanché, Yucatán
15:00		Report		Stadium: Estadio Alonso Diego Molina; Attendance: 250; Referee: Sergio Gabriel Mengual Ortega

9 May 2018	Córdoba	1–0	Académicos UGM	Córdoba, Veracruz
16:00	López 57'	Report		Stadium: Estadio Rafael Murillo Vidal; Attendance: 600; Referee: Gerardo Mercado Morales

9 May 2018	Poza Rica	3–0	Marina	Poza Rica, Veracruz
17:00	García 29'; Estopier 34'; Tede 64'	Report		Stadium: Estadio Heriberto Jara Corona; Attendance: 4,500; Referee: Kevin Kober Contreras Reyes

10 May 2018	Fuerza Mazahua	2–1	Pachuca	Ixtlahuaca de Rayón, State of Mexico
15:00	García 14'; Vidaña 60'	Report	Marchand 87'	Stadium: Estadio Municipal de Ixtlahuaca; Attendance: 250; Referee: Luis Enrique Rivera Fuentes

===== Second leg =====
12 May 2018	Marina	2–0 (2–3 agg.)	Poza Rica	Xochimilco, Mexico City
11:00	Meléndez 45'; Téllez 69'	Report		Stadium: Estadio Valentín González; Attendance: 700; Referee: Tomás Jaír Salazar Rivera

12 May 2018	Académicos UGM	1–2 (1–3 agg.)	Córdoba	Orizaba, Veracruz
13:00	Carmona 3'	Report	López 13', 88'	Stadium: Estadio Universitario UGM; Attendance: 1,000; Referee: Eduardo González Flores

12 May 2018	Potros UAEM	1–2 (1–2 agg.)	Deportiva Venados	Toluca, State of Mexico
13:00	Orihuela 7'	Report	Ramírez 48'; González 60'	Stadium: Estadio Universitario Alberto "Chivo" Córdoba; Attendance: 800; Referee: Ricardo Emmanuel Chávez Sánchez

12 May 2018	Tigrillos Dorados MRCI	1–0 (1–0 agg.)	Atlético Estado de México	San Jerónimo Tlacochahuaya, Oaxaca
16:00	García 39'	Report		Stadium: Estadio Independiente MRCI; Attendance: 200; Referee: Eduardo Adrián Vázquez Hernández

13 May 2018	Pachuca	1–0 (2–2 agg.) (3–1 p)	Fuerza Mazahua	San Agustín Tlaxiaca, Hidalgo
11:00	Martínez 76'	Report		Stadium: Universidad del Fútbol; Attendance: 300; Referee: Pedro Hernández García

==== North zone ====
Team 1	Agg.	Team 2	1st leg	2nd leg
Acatlán	2–1	Hidalguense	1–1	1–0
CDU Uruapan	4–3	Tancredi	1–3	3–0
Atlético Valladolid (Note: Atlético Valladolid advanced to the next round having the best regional coefficient of the season)	2–3	Universidad Cuauhtémoc	0–2	2–1
Saltillo Soccer	3–1	CAFESSA	1–0	2–1
Real Aguascalientes	1–6	Águilas UAS	1–1	0–5

===== First leg =====
9 May 2018	Universidad Cuauhtémoc	2–0	Atlético Valladolid	Zapopan, Jalisco
11:00	López 20'; Castellanos 53'	Report		Stadium: Universidad Cuauhtémoc Guadalajara; Attendance: 200; Referee: Priscila Eritzel Pérez Borja

9 May 2018	Águilas UAS	1–1	Real Aguascalientes	Culiacán, Sinaloa
19:00	Adrián 45'	Report	González 11'	Stadium: Estadio Universitario UAS; Attendance: 300; Referee: Harold Rodríguez Pérez

10 May 2018	Hidalguense	1–1	Acatlán	Pachuca, Hidalgo
16:00	Macías 35'	Report	Hernández 65'	Stadium: Club Hidalguense; Attendance: 150; Referee: Martín Molina Astorga

10 May 2018	Tancredi	3–1	CDU Uruapan	Aguascalientes City, Aguascalientes
18:00	Arteaga 20', 33'; Sandoval 90+3'	Report	López 14'	Stadium: Centro Deportivo Ferrocarrilero Tres Centurias; Attendance: 169; Referee: Guillermo Estrada Rea

10 May 2018	CAFESSA	0–1	Saltillo Soccer	Tlajomulco de Zúñiga, Jalisco
20:00		Report	Solís 24'	Stadium: Unidad Deportiva Mariano Otero; Attendance: 250; Referee: Miguel Ángel Anaya Suárez

===== Second leg =====
12 May 2018	Atlético Valladolid	2–1 (3–2 agg.)	Universidad Cuauhtémoc	Pátzcuaro, Michoacán
16:00	Chávez 69', 76'	Report	Jiménez 82'	Stadium: Unidad Deportiva de Pátzcuaro; Attendance: 400; Referee: Brandon Campillo Martínez

12 May 2018	Real Aguascalientes	0–5 (1–6 agg.)	Águilas UAS	Aguascalientes City, Aguascalientes
16:00		Report	Adrián 61'; Martínez 63'; Valdivia 70', 92'; Urías 89'	Stadium: Centro Deportivo Ferrocarrilero Tres Centurias; Attendance: 200; Referee: Fabián Lechuga Chavarría

13 May 2018	Saltillo Soccer	2–1 (3–1 agg.)	CAFESSA	Saltillo, Coahuila
12:00	Ramos 45'; Solís 78'	Report	Virgen 8'	Stadium: Estadio Olímpico Francisco I. Madero; Attendance: 300; Referee: Adrián Alberto Gutiérrez Ibarra

13 May 2020	Acatlán	1–0 (2–1 agg.)	Hidalguense	Acatlán de Juárez, Jalisco
12:00	Casillas 56'	Report		Stadium: Club Juárez; Attendance: 1,000; Referee: Mauricio Eleazar López Sánchez

13 May 2018	CDU Uruapan	3–0 (4–3 agg.)	Tancredi	Uruapan, Michoacán
16:00	Menera 54'; López 78'; Peña 82'	Report		Stadium: Unidad Deportiva Hermanos López Rayón; Attendance: 1,500; Referee: Iván Antonio López Sánchez

=== Fourth round ===
==== South zone ====
Team 1	Agg.	Team 2	1st leg	2nd leg
Pachuca	1–1 (4–5)	(p.) Marina	0–0	1–1
Tigrillos Dorados MRCI	2–2 (4–5)	(p.) Poza Rica	1–1	1–1
Córdoba	3–2	Deportiva Venados	2–1	1–1

===== First leg =====
16 May 2018	Córdoba	2–1	Deportiva Venados	Córdoba, Veracruz
16:00	López 9', 30'	Report	Jupamea 21'	Stadium: Estadio Rafael Murillo Vidal; Attendance: 1,500; Referee: Brandon Campillo Martínez

16 May 2018	Poza Rica	1–1	Tigrillos Dorados MRCI	Poza Rica, Veracruz
17:00	López 58'	Report	Bautista 72'	Stadium: Estadio Heriberto Jara Corona; Attendance: 5,500; Referee: Eduardo González Flores

17 May 2018	Marina	0–0	Pachuca	Xochimilco, Mexico City
12:00		Report		Stadium: Estadio Valentín González; Attendance: 100; Referee: Ricardo Emmanuel Chávez Sánchez

===== Second leg =====
19 May 2018	Deportiva Venados	1–1 (2–3 agg.)	Córdoba	Tamanché, Yucatán
15:00	Jupamea 45'	Report	Bazán 66'	Stadium: Estadio Alonso Diego Molina; Attendance: 500; Referee: Luis Alberto Mattern García

19 May 2018	Tigrillos Dorados MRCI	1–1 (2–2 agg.) (4–5 p)	Poza Rica	San Jerónimo Tlacochahuaya, Oaxaca
16:00	García 44'	Report	Tede 90+1'	Stadium: Estadio Independiente MRCI; Attendance: 700; Referee: Tomás Jaír Salazar Rivera

20 May 2018	Pachuca	1–1 (1–1 agg.) (4–5 p)	Marina	San Agustín Tlaxiaca, Hidalgo
11:00	Montero 45'	Report	Ávila 35'	Stadium: Universidad del Fútbol; Attendance: 200; Referee: Miguel Ángel Anaya Suárez

==== North zone ====
Team 1	Agg.	Team 2	1st leg	2nd leg
Acatlán (p.)	4–4 (4–2)	Atlético Valladolid	2–3	2–1
CDU Uruapan	3–2	Universidad Cuauhtémoc	2–2	1–0
Saltillo Soccer	2–4	Águilas UAS	0–3	2–1

===== First leg =====
17 May 2018	Universidad Cuauhtémoc	2–2	CDU Uruapan	Zapopan, Jalisco
11:00	Marrujo 22'; Rosales 82'	Report	Meza 50'; López 62'	Stadium: Universidad Cuauhtémoc Guadalajara; Attendance: 500; Referee: Gerardo Abraham García Armendaris

17 May 2018	Atlético Valladolid	3–2	Acatlán	Pátzcuaro, Michoacán
16:00	López 19'; Mendoza 50', 68'	Report	Beltrán 12', 20'	Stadium: Unidad Deportiva de Pátzcuaro; Attendance: 1,000; Referee: Gerardo Mercado Morales

17 May 2018	Águilas UAS	3–0	Saltillo Soccer	Culiacán, Sinaloa
19:00	Adrián 4', 47'; Valdivia 30'	Report		Stadium: Estadio Universitario UAS; Attendance: 500; Referee: Jorge López Hernández

===== Second leg =====
20 May 2018	Acatlán	2–1 (4–4 agg.) (4–2 p)	Atlético Valladolid	Acatlán de Juárez, Jalisco
12:00	Beltrán 9'; Ibarra 23'	Report	López 39'	Stadium: Club Juárez; Attendance: 800; Referee: Iván Antonio López Sánchez

20 May 2018	CDU Uruapan	1–0 (3–2 agg.)	Universidad Cuauhtémoc	Uruapan, Michoacán
16:00	Menera 17'	Report		Stadium: Unidad Deportiva Hermanos López Rayón; Attendance: 2,500; Referee: Martín Molina Astorga

20 May 2018	Saltillo Soccer	2–1 (2–4 agg.)	Águilas UAS	Saltillo, Coahuila
16:00	Solís 30'; López 72'	Report	Torres 29'	Stadium: Estadio Olímpico Francisco I. Madero; Attendance: 3,000; Referee: Kevin Kober Contreras Reyes

=== Championship round ===
Quarter-finals
1	Marina	1	3	4
6	Poza Rica	2	1	3
---------	X	X	X
---------	X	X	X
2	Acatlán	0	2	2
5	Águilas UAS	1	0	1
3	CDU Uruapan (p.)	1	1	2 (6)
4	Córdoba	0	2	2 (5)

Semi-finals
1	Marina (Note: Marina qualified directly to the final for being the best team in the regular season)	X	X	X
X	---------	X	X	X
2	Acatlán	1	3	4
3	CDU Uruapan	0	0	0

Final
1	Marina	0	1	1 (4)
2	Acatlán (p.)	0	1	1 (5)

==== Quarter-finals ====
Team 1	Agg.	Team 2	1st leg	2nd leg
Marina	4–3	Poza Rica	1–2	3–1
Acatlán	2–1	Águilas UAS	0–1	2–0
CDU Uruapan (p.)	2–2 (6–5)	Córdoba	1–0	1–2

===== First leg =====
23 May 2018	Poza Rica	2–1	Marina	Poza Rica, Veracruz
17:00	Estopier 15'; Ávila 45' (own)	Report	Ávila 86'	Stadium: Estadio Heriberto Jara Corona; Attendance: 7,000; Referee: Ramón Guerrero Martínez

24 May 2018	Córdoba	0–1	CDU Uruapan	Córdoba, Veracruz
16:00		Report	López 74'	Stadium: Estadio Rafael Murillo Vidal; Attendance: 2,500; Referee: Gerardo Mercado Morales

24 May 2018	Águilas UAS	1–0	Acatlán	Culiacán, Sinaloa
19:00	Urías 26'	Report		Stadium: Estadio Universitario UAS; Attendance: Ismael Rosario López Peñuelas; Referee: 300

===== Second leg =====
26 May 2018	Marina	3–1 (4–3 agg.)	Poza Rica	Xochimilco, Mexico City
12:00	Ávila 7'; Mendoza 54'; Romualdo 68'	Report	Tede 84'	Stadium: Estadio Valentín González; Attendance: 500; Referee: Miguel Ángel Anaya Suárez

27 May 2018	Acatlán	2–0 (2–1 agg.)	Águilas UAS	Acatlán de Juárez, Jalisco
12:00	Beltrán 67'; Ibarra 79'	Report		Stadium: Club Juárez; Attendance: 1,000; Referee: Iván Antonio López Sánchez

27 May 2018	CDU Uruapan	1–2 (2–2 agg.) (6–5 p)	Córdoba	Uruapan, Michoacán
16:00	Peña 87'	Report	López 81'; Sima 90'	Stadium: Unidad Deportiva Hermanos López Rayón; Attendance: 3,000; Referee: Brandon Campillo Martínez

==== Semi-final ====
Team 1	Agg.	Team 2	1st leg	2nd leg
Acatlán	4–0	CDU Uruapan	1–0	3–0

===== First leg =====
31 May 2018	CDU Uruapan	0–1	Acatlán	Uruapan, Michoacán
16:00		Report	Hernández 59'	Stadium: Unidad Deportiva Hermanos López Rayón; Attendance: 3,000; Referee: Eduardo González Flores

===== Second leg =====
3 June 2018	Acatlán	3–0 (4–0 agg.)	CDU Uruapan	Acatlán de Juárez, Jalisco
12:00	Flores 33'; Beltrán 76' iBARRA 90+3'	Report		Stadium: Club Juárez; Attendance: 1,200; Referee: Gerardo Mercado Morales

==== Final ====
Team 1	Agg.	Team 2	1st leg	2nd leg
Marina	1–1 (4–5)	(p.) Acatlán	0–0	1–1

===== First leg =====
7 June 2018	Acatlán	0–0	Marina	Toluca, State of Mexico
12:00		Report		Stadium: Instalaciones de la FMF – Cancha 1 Attendance: 200; Referee: Donnet Steffy Molina Sánchez

===== Second leg =====
10 June 2018	Marina	1–1 (1–1 agg.) (4–5 p)	Acatlán	Toluca, State of Mexico
12:00	Rodulfo 50'	Report	Hernández 34'	Stadium: Instalaciones de la FMF – Cancha 4 Attendance: 1,000; Referee: Ramón Guerrero Martínez
	Penalties
	Ávila (penalty scored); Rodulfo (penalty missed); Araujo (penalty scored); H. López (penalty scored); Rodríguez (penalty missed); Silva (penalty scored); Lizarde (penalty missed)		Rodríguez (penalty missed); Ibarra (penalty scored); L. López (penalty missed); Guzmán (penalty scored); De Anda (penalty scored); Hernández (penalty scored); García (penalty scored)

2017–18 winners

1st title

== Reserve Teams ==
=== Table ===
P	Team	Pts	G	Pts/G	GD
1	Juárez	67	24	2.79	57
2	Tijuana	63	24	2.63	58
3	Correcaminos UAT	81	32	2.53	53
4	Tigres SD	78	32	2.44	63
5	Mineros de Zacatecas	88	38	2.32	66
6	Leones Negros UdeG	83	36	2.31	54
7	Alebrijes de Oaxaca	72	32	2.25	32
8	Pumas UNAM	74	34	2.18	49
9	Guadalajara	73	34	2.15	42
10	Universidad del Fútbol	62	30	2.07	26
11	UdeG Lagos de Moreno	70	38	1.84	14
12	UACH	44	24	1.83	10
13	Celaya	62	34	1.82	18
14	Tecos	57	34	1.68	4
15	Atlante	56	34	1.65	17
16	Cadereyta	51	32	1.59	9
17	Cafetaleros de Tapachula	46	30	1.53	9
18	Cafetaleros FORMAFUTINTEGRAL	52	34	1.53	17
19	Durango	35	24	1.46	7
20	Dorados de Sinaloa	49	34	1.44	8
21	Escuela de Fútbol Chivas	47	36	1.31	–7
22	Cimarrones de Sonora	31	24	1.29	–15
23	Victoria	29	24	1.21	–9
24	Carmen	28	26	1.08	–19
25	Dragones de Tabasco	19	26	0.73	–41
26	CEFO–ALR	17	36	0.47	–69
27	Delfines Márquez	5	26	0.19	–74

Last updated: April 21, 2018
Source: Liga TDP
P = Position; G = Games played; Pts = Points; Pts/G = Ratio of points to games played; GD = Goal difference

=== Playoffs ===
Quarter-finals
4	Tigres SD (p.)	2	1	3 (3)
5	Mineros de Zacatecas	3	0	3 (0)
3	Correcaminos UAT	0	1	1 (3)
6	Leones Negros UdeG (p.)	1	0	1 (4)
2	Tijuana	4	2	6
7	Alebrijes de Oaxaca	3	0	3
1	Juárez	2	1	3 (3)
8	Pumas UNAM	2	1	3 (4)

Semi-finals
4	Tigres SD (p.)	3	0	3 (5)
6	Leones Negros UdeG	0	3	3 (3)
2	Tijuana	1	3	4
8	Pumas UNAM	3	2	5

Final
4	Tigres SD	1	1	2 (2)
8	Pumas UNAM (p.)	1	1	2 (4)

==== Quarter-finals ====
Team 1	Agg.	Team 2	1st leg	2nd leg
Tigres SD (p.)	3–3 (3–0)	Mineros de Zacatecas	2–3	1–0
Correcaminos UAT	1–1 (3–4)	(p.) Leones Negros UdeG	0–1	1–0
Tijuana	6–3	Alebrijes de Oaxaca	4–3	2–0
Juárez	3–3 (3–4)	Pumas UNAM	2–2	1–1

===== First leg =====
27 April 2018	Pumas UNAM	2–2	Juárez	Coyoacán, Mexico City
11:00	Peñalva 76'; García 82'	Report	Flores 49'; Pánuco 87'	Stadium: Instalaciones de La Cantera; Attendance: 250; Referee: Pedro Hernández García

27 April 2018	Mineros de Zacatecas	3–2	Tigres SD	Guadalupe, Zacatecas
11:00	Casas 4', 70'; Iglecias 68'	Report	Treviño 27', 43'	Stadium: Unidad Deportiva Guadalupe; Attendance: 200; Referee: Oziel Méndez de Anda

28 April 2018	Leones Negros UdeG	1–0	Correcaminos UAT	Zapopan, Jalisco
11:00	Rábago 23'	Report		Stadium: Club Deportivo La Primavera; Attendance: 100; Referee: Edwin Eduardo Morfín Verduzco

28 April 2018	Alebrijes de Oaxaca	3–4	Tijuana	Huixquilucan de Degollado, State of Mexico
16:00	Juárez 8'; Sánchez 18'; Torquemada 33'	Report	Monge 10'; Miranda 16', 25'; Ramos 83'	Stadium: Estadio Alberto Pérez Navarro; Attendance: 100; Referee: Tomás Jair Salazar Rivera

===== Second leg =====
4 May 2018	Tijuana	2–0 (6–3 agg.)	Alebrijes de Oaxaca	Hermosillo, Sonora
20:00	Ramos 19', 30'	Report		Stadium: Cancha Aarón Gamal Aguirre Fimbres; Attendance: 200; Referee: Adrián Alberto Gutiérrez Ibarra

5 May 2018	Correcaminos UAT	1–0 (1–1 agg.) (3–4 p)	Leones Negros UdeG	Ciudad Victoria, Tamaulipas
11:00	Blanco 75'	Report		Stadium: Estadio Marte R. Gómez; Attendance: 1,000; Referee: Josué Antonio Zuárez Rico

5 May 2018	Juárez	1–1 (3–3 agg.) (3–4 p)	Pumas UNAM	Ciudad Juárez, Chihuahua
11:00	Salazar 16'	Report	Ledón 2'	Stadium: Estadio Olímpico Benito Juárez; Attendance: 3,000; Referee: José Roberto González Robledo

5 May 2018	Tigres SD	1–0 (3–3 agg.) (3–0 p)	Mineros de Zacatecas	General Zuazua, Nuevo León
11:15	Acevedo 31'	Report		Stadium: Instalaciones de Zuazua; Attendance: 100; Referee: Kevin Kober Contreras Reyes

==== Semi-finals ====
Team 1	Agg.	Team 2	1st leg	2nd leg
Tigres SD (p.)	3–3 (5–4)	Leones Negros UdeG	3–0	0–3
Tijuana	4–5	Pumas UNAM	1–3	3–2

===== First leg =====
11 May 2018	Pumas UNAM	3–1	Tijuana	Coyoacán, Mexico City
11:00	Montejano 24', 71'; García 75'	Report	Tona 41'	Stadium: Instalaciones de La Cantera; Attendance: 200; Referee: Gamaliel Dasaed Vite Sánchez

12 May 2018	Leones Negros UdeG	0–3	Tigres SD	Zapopan, Jalisco
11:00		Report	Treviño 20', 62'; Acevedo 42'	Stadium: Club Deportivo La Primavera; Attendance: 200; Referee: Vicente Jassiel Reynoso Arce

===== Second leg =====
18 May 2018	Tigres SD	0–3 (3–3 agg.) (5–4 p)	Leones Negros UdeG	General Zuazua, Nuevo León
10:00		Report	Murillo 32'; Díaz 46'; Ruiz 89'	Stadium: Instalaciones de Zuazua; Attendance: 100; Referee: Jorge Alejandro Martínez Loya

18 May 2018	Tijuana	3–2 (4–5 agg.)	Pumas UNAM	Hermosillo, Sonora
20:00	López 36'; Tona 61'; Alcántar 85'	Report	Montejano 46'; Rodríguez 63'	Stadium: Cancha Aarón Gamal Aguirre Fimbres; Attendance: 733; Referee: José Roberto González Robledo

==== Final ====
Team 1	Agg.	Team 2	1st leg	2nd leg
Tigres SD	2–2 (2–4)	(p.) Pumas UNAM	1–1	1–1

===== First leg =====
25 May 2018	Pumas UNAM	1–1	Tigres SD	Coyoacán, Mexico City
11:00	Ramírez 19'	Report	Garza 74'	Stadium: Instalaciones de La Cantera; Attendance: 500; Referee: Priscila Eritzel Pérez Borja

===== Second leg =====
1 June 2018	Tigres SD	1–1 (2–2 agg.) (2–4 p)	Pumas UNAM	General Zuazua, Nuevo León
10:00	Treviño 68'	Report	Montejano 23'	Stadium: Instalaciones de Zuazua; Attendance: 300; Referee: Harold Rodríguez Pérez

2017–18 Filiales winners

1st title

== Regular season statistics ==
=== Top goalscorers ===
Players sorted first by goals scored, then by last name.

Rank	Player	Club	Goals
1	(Mexico) José Ángel Espinoza	Cefor Canamy	45
2	(Mexico) Esteban Torres	Albinegros de Orizaba	40
3	(Mexico) Jorjan Pérez	Reales de Puebla	39
4	(Mexico) Sergio Eduardo Rivera	Atlético San Francisco	37
5	(Mexico) Eduardo López	CDU Uruapan	35
6	(Mexico) Alan Delgado	Azules de la Sección 26	32
7	(Mexico) Diego Guadalupe Medina	Tepatitlán	31
8	(Mexico) Carlos Antonio Casas	Mineros de Zacatecas	30
9	(Mexico) Billy Uriel Espinosa	Sultanes de Tamazunchale	29
10	(Mexico) Diego Raudel Padilla	Aves Blancas	28

Last updated on April 21, 2018.
Source: LigaTDP

== See also ==
- Tercera División de México
