= Ixcuinquitlapilco =

Community in San Agustin Tlaxiaca, Hidalgo, Mexico

Coordinates: 20°07′N 98°57′W

Ixcuinquitlapilco is a community in the municipality of San Agustín Tlaxiaca in the state of Hidalgo, Mexico. It is located west of the municipal capital, and approximately 25 km away from Pachuca, the state capital.

== History ==
It is assumed the site was first inhabited around the year 3000 B.C., first by the Toltecs, and afterwards by the Mexicas. Archeological sites exist in the four cardinal points of the community, which indicate a cosmological vision and possible ritual in the location of the settlement.

The Church of Saint Matthew the Apostle is located in the centre of the community. It is a seventeenth century archaeological monument and the primary attraction of visitors to Ixcuinquitlapilco. In the Victorian colony belonging to this community, one can find the established estate of Temoaya, which dates to the eighteenth century and was originally used as for farming and cattle raising, having characteristic elements of the estates of the times of Porfiriato, with a granary, warehouses, a reservoir for water, and a house for the foreman.

== Description ==
Ixcuinquitlapilco is situated 2,260m above sea level. The area is made up of mountains, hills, plains, and farmland. The climate is temperate cold semidesert.

== People ==
As of the 2005 census, the community had a population of 2,979. The community's inhabitants are employed in the fields of agriculture and livestock farming, as well as in more commercial pursuits.

== Education ==
The community contains a preschool, a primary school, and a Telesecundaria high school, along with different community courses in other neighbourhoods and colonies.

== Government ==
The city is represented by a municipal delegate, a conciliatory judge, district judges and commissioners. Ejidatarios (former landowners, or people who lease the land from the government) of the community are represented by the President of the Edijal Commission ("the Commissioner of Communal Lands") and the Supervisory Board.

== Coat of arms ==
Ixcuinquitlapilco's coat of arms is a dog lying with a lowered tail, above three aligned hills. Its description is: "Between the tail of a dog."
