= Jiquipilas =

- Municipality
- Municipality of Jiquipilas in Chiapas

- Location in Mexico
- Coordinates: 16°40′6″N 93°38′40″W
- Country: Mexico
- State: Chiapas

Area
  - Total: 462.3 sq mi (1,197.3 km^{2})

Population (2010)
  - Total: 37,818

Jiquipilas is a town and municipality in the Mexican state of Chiapas in southern Mexico.

As of 2010, the municipality had a total population of 37,818, up from 34,937 as of 2005. It covers an area of 1197.3 km^{2}.

As of 2010, the town of Jiquipilas had a population of 9,894. Other than the town of Jiquipilas, the municipality had 580 localities, the largest of which (with 2010 populations in parentheses) were: Tierra y Libertad (2,600), classified as urban, and José María Pino Suárez (2,091), Tiltepec (2,007), Vicente Guerrero (1,383), Cuauhtémoc (1,300), Julián Grajales (1,293), Quintana Roo (1,243), and Nueva Palestina (1,116), classified as rural.
