= San Agustín Tlaxiaca =

- Town and municipality
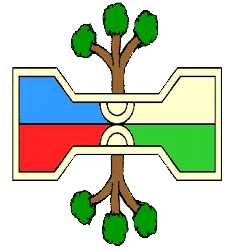
- Coat of arms

- Location within Hidalgo Location within Mexico
- Coordinates: 20°06′52″N 98°53′12″W
- Country: Mexico
- State: Hidalgo
- Municipality: San Agustín Tlaxiaca

Government
  - Federal electoral district: Hidalgo's 6th

Area
  - Total: 354.6 km^{2} (136.9 sq mi)

Population (2005)
  - Total: 27,118
- Time zone: UTC-6 (Zona Centro)
- Website: sanagustintlaxiaca.gob.mx

San Agustín Tlaxiaca is a town and one of the 84 municipalities of Hidalgo, in central-eastern Mexico. The municipality covers an area of 354.6 km^{2}.

As of 2005, the municipality had a total population of 27,118.

== Geography ==
It is located between the parallels 98° 48’ 20” and 99° 05’ 32” west longitude, and 19° 57’ 20” and 20° 12’ 22” north latitude. San Agustín Tlaxiaca borders. It covers a total surface area of 354.6 km^{2}. In the year 2010 census by INEGI, it reported a population of . The total municipality extends 96.37 and borders with the municipalities of Ajacuba, Actopan, Pachuca, El Arenal, Mineral del Chico, Zapotlán de Juárez, Tolcayuca and the state of México (Hueypoxtla).

The town of San Agustín Tlaxiaca, as the municipal seat, has governing jurisdiction over the following communities: Ixcuinquitlapilco, San Juan Solis, and Pozos.

== Demography ==
=== Populated places in San Agustín Tlaxiaca ===
Town	Population
Total	
San Agustín Tlaxiaca	
San Juan Solís	
Tornacuxtla	
Chapultepec de Pozos	
Ixcuinquitlapilco	
