= Rojos de Colima F.C. =

Rojos de Colima
- Full name: Rojos de Colima Fútbol Club
- Founded: 2014
- Ground: Estadio Colima, Colima City, Colima
- Capacity: 12,000
- Manager: David Arellano
- League: Tercera División de México

Rojos de Colima Fútbol Club is a Mexican football club that plays in the Tercera División de México. The club is based in Colima City, Colima and was founded in 2014 as Palmeros F.C.. In november 2018, the team was renamed as Rojos de Colima Fútbol Club.

== See also ==
- Football in Mexico
- Tercera División de México
