= Real Aguascalientes =

- Full name: Real Aguascalientes Fútbol Club
- Founded: 2014; 12 years ago
- Ground: Centro Deportivo Ferrocarrilero Las Tres Centurias; Aguascalientes, Aguascalientes
- Capacity: 1,000
- Manager: Alejandro Alba
- League: Tercera División de México
Home colours	Away colours

Real Aguascalientes Fútbol Club is a Mexican football club based in the city of Aguascalientes, Aguascalientes that competes in the Tercera División de México, the bottom level division of Mexican football.

== See also ==
- Football in Mexico
- Tercera División de México
