= 2014–15 Tercera División de México season =

Tercera División Profesional
- Season: 2014–15
- Dates: 4 September 2014 – 6 June 2015
- Champions: CDU Uruapan (1st title)
- Promoted: CDU Uruapan; Sporting Canamy
- Stats are from the regular season only

The 2014–15 Tercera División season is the fourth-tier football league of Mexico. The tournament began on 4 September 2014 and finished on 6 June 2015.

== Competition format ==
The Tercera División (Third Division) is divided into 14 groups. For the 2009/2010 season, the format of the tournament has been reorganized to a home and away format, which all teams will play in their respective group. The 14 groups consist of teams who are eligible to play in the liguilla de ascenso for one promotion spot, teams who are affiliated with teams in the Liga MX, Ascenso MX and Liga Premier, which are not eligible for promotion but will play that who the better filial team in an eight team filial playoff tournament for the entire season.

The league format allows participating franchises to rent their place to another team, so some clubs compete with a different name than the one registered with the FMF.

== Group 1 ==
Group with 13 teams from Campeche, Chiapas, Quintana Roo, Tabasco and Yucatán.

Location of teams in the 2014–15 3ra División Group 1 (Carmen (Campeche), Chiapas and Tabasco)
Location of teams in the 2014–15 3ra División Group 1 (Quintana Roo)
Location of teams in the 2014–15 3ra División Group 1 (Campeche City and Yucatán)

=== Teams ===
Team	City	Home ground	Capacity	Affiliate	Official name
Atlante Tabasco	Villahermosa, Tabasco	CEFOR Atlante Tabasco	1,000	Atlante	–
Campeche	Campeche, Campeche	La Muralla de Kin-Ha	500	—	—
Chetumal	Chetumal, Quintana Roo	10 de Abril	5,000	—	—
Corsarios de Campeche	Campeche, Campeche	Universitario de Campeche	4,000	—	—
Dragones de Tabasco	Villahermosa, Tabasco	Olímpico de Villahermosa	12,000	—	Real Victoria
Ejidatarios de Bonfil	Cancún, Quintana Roo	La Parcela	1,000	—	—
Inter Playa del Carmen	Playa del Carmen, Quintana Roo	Unidad Deportiva Félix González Canto	1,000	Inter Playa del Carmen	—
Itzaes	Homún, Yucatán	Hipólito Tzab	1,000	–	–
Mapaches UTCAM	Ciudad del Carmen, Campeche	Universidad Tecnológica de Campeche	500	–	–
Mérida	Mérida, Yucatán	Alonso Diego Molina	2,500	Mérida	—
Jaguares de la 48	Reforma, Chiapas	Sergio Lira Gallardo	600	—	—
Pioneros Junior	Cancún, Quintana Roo	Cancún 86	6,390	Pioneros de Cancún	—
Yalmakán	Puerto Morelos, Quintana Roo	Unidad Deportiva Colonia Pescadores	1,200	Yalmakán	—

=== League table ===
Pos	Team	Pld	W	D	L	GF	GA	GD	BP	Pts	Qualification or relegation
1	Chetumal	24	17	3	4	39	14	+25	1	55	Promotion play-offs
2	Mérida	24	12	7	5	39	25	+14	5	48	Promotion play-offs
3	Dragones de Tabasco	24	10	10	4	45	27	+18	7	47	Promotion play-offs
4	Inter Playa del Carmen	24	13	5	6	48	25	+23	1	45	Promotion play-offs
5	Jaguares de la 48	24	13	5	6	42	20	+22	1	45	
6	Pioneros Junior	24	11	7	6	39	25	+14	5	45	
7	Campeche	24	11	7	6	41	27	+14	4	44	
8	Mapaches UTCAM	24	9	7	8	37	24	+13	4	38	
9	Corsarios de Campeche	24	9	7	8	29	28	+1	4	38	
10	Yalmakán	24	6	8	10	34	33	+1	5	31	
11	Ejidatarios de Bonfil	24	5	3	16	24	63	−39	0	18	
12	Itzaes	24	2	2	20	11	51	−40	0	8	
13	Atlante Tabasco	24	1	3	20	18	84	−66	0	6	

Source: Tercera División FMF

== Group 2 ==
Group with 18 teams from Chiapas, Oaxaca and Veracruz.

=== Teams ===
Location of teams in the 2014–15 3ra División Group 3 (Chiapas, Oaxaca and Southern Veracruz)
Location of teams in the 2014–15 3ra División Group 2 (Northern and Central Veraruz)

Team	City	Home ground	Capacity	Affiliate	Official Name
Atlético Acayucan	Acayucan, Veracruz	Unidad Deportiva Vicente Obregón	1,000	—	—
Atlético Boca del Río	Boca del Río, Veracruz	Unidad Deportiva Hugo Sánchez	2,500	—	–
Atlético Ixtepec	Ixtepec, Oaxaca	Brena Torres	1,000	—	–
Atlético Veracruz	Veracruz City, Veracruz	La Finca JR	1,000	Veracruz	–
Azucareros de Tezonapa	Tezonapa, Veracruz	Ernesto Jácome	1,000	–	–
Búhos de Xalapa	Xalapa, Veracruz	Escuela Artículo 3º Constitucional	500	–	–
Cafetaleros de Xalapa	Xalapa, Veracruz	Antonio M. Quirasco	3,000	–	Ciudad Valles
Chimbombos de Cintalapa	Cintalapa, Chiapas	Municipal	1,000	–	–
Cruz Azul Lagunas	Lagunas, Oaxaca	Cruz Azul	2,000	Cruz Azul	–
Delfines UGM	Nogales, Veracruz	UGM Nogales	1,500	—	—
Estudiantes de San Andrés	San Andrés Tuxtla, Veracruz	Unidad Deportiva Lino Fararoni	1,000	—	–
Halcones Marinos de Veracruz	Boca del Río, Veracruz	Unidad Deportiva Hugo Sánchez	2,500	—	–
Jiquipilas Valle Verde	Jiquipilas, Chiapas	Municipal Richard Ruíz	3,000	–	–
Lanceros de Cosoleacaque	Cosoleacaque, Veracruz	Unidad Deportiva Miguel Hidalgo	1,000	–	–
Limoneros de Fútbol	Martínez de la Torre, Veracruz	El Cañizo	3,000	–	–
Mezcalapa	Raudales Malpaso, Chiapas	Adolfo López Mateos "La Vaporera"	4,000	–	Atlético Chiapas
Petroleros de Poza Rica	Poza Rica, Veracruz	Heriberto Jara Corona	10,000	—	—
Piñeros de Loma Bonita	Loma Bonita, Oaxaca	20 de Noviembre	1,000	–	–

=== League table ===
Pos	Team	Pld	W	D	L	GF	GA	GD	BP	Pts	Qualification or relegation
1	Mezcalapa	34	21	11	2	84	29	+55	5	79	Promotion play-offs
2	Atlético Veracruz	34	19	7	8	70	37	+33	4	68	Promotion play-offs
3	Piñeros de Loma Bonita	34	19	6	9	71	38	+33	4	67	Promotion play-offs
4	Limoneros de Fútbol	34	17	7	10	61	40	+21	4	62	Promotion play-offs
5	Estudiantes de San Andrés	34	17	9	8	79	59	+20	2	62	Promotion play-offs
6	Halcones Marinos de Veracruz	34	15	11	8	56	51	+5	4	60	
7	Atlético Acayucan	34	16	8	10	75	57	+18	3	59	
8	Azucareros de Tezonapa	34	16	6	12	40	40	0	4	58	
9	Jiquipilas Valle Verde	34	16	4	14	47	34	+13	3	55	
10	Petroleros de Poza Rica	34	14	7	13	55	45	+10	4	53	
11	Atlético Boca del Río	34	12	9	13	45	59	−14	6	51	
12	Cafetaleros de Xalapa	34	12	9	13	43	48	−5	4	49	
13	Búhos de Xalapa	34	14	5	15	48	45	+3	1	48	
14	Cruz Azul Lagunas	34	12	8	14	29	43	−14	3	47	
15	Lanceros de Cosoleacaque	34	8	5	21	40	71	−31	2	31	
16	Chimbombos de Cintalapa	34	6	6	22	34	76	−42	2	26	
17	Atlético Ixtepec	34	6	4	24	29	86	−57	1	23	
18	Delfines UGM	34	3	7	24	30	78	−48	4	20	

Source: Tercera División FMF

== Group 3 ==
Group with 16 teams from Hidalgo, Puebla, San Luis Potosí and Veracruz.

=== Teams ===
Location of teams in the 2014–15 3ra División Group 2
Location of teams in the 2014–15 3ra División Group 3 (Ixmiquilpan)

Team	City	Home ground	Capacity	Affiliate	Official Name
Académicos UGM	Orizaba, Veracruz	Universitario UGM Orizaba	1,500	—	—
Albinegros de Orizaba	Orizaba, Veracruz	EMSA	1,500	Albinegros de Orizaba	—
Atlético Hidalgo	Pachuca, Hidalgo	La Higa	1,000	–	–
Anlesjeroka	Tehuacán, Puebla	Anlesjeroka	500	—	—
CEFOR Cuauhtémoc Blanco	Huauchinango, Puebla	Nido Águila Huauchinango	300	–	–
Deportivo Ixmiquilpan	Ixmiquilpan, Hidalgo	Unidad Deportiva Ixmiquilpan	1,000	–	Plateados de Cerro Azul
Leones de Huauchinango	Huauchinango, Puebla	Unidad Deportiva México	1,000	–	–
Linces de Tlaxcala	Tlaxcala City, Tlaxcala	Maracaná Tlaxco	500	–	–
Lobos BUAP	Puebla City, Puebla	Ciudad Universitaria Puebla	1,000	Lobos BUAP	–
Los Ángeles	Puebla, Puebla	Ex Hacienda San José Maravillas	500	—	—
Puebla SAI	Santa Isabel Cholula, Puebla	Santa Isabel Cholula	600	Puebla	–
Reales de Puebla	Puebla, Puebla	Preparatoria Benito Juárez	1,000	—	—
Santos Córdoba	Córdoba, Veracruz	Rafael Murillo Vidal	3,800	Santos Laguna	–
Star Club	Tlaxcala City, Tlaxcala	San José del Agua	500	—	—
Sultanes de Tamazunchale	Tamazunchale, San Luis Potosí	Deportivo Solidaridad	1,650	—	—
Xiutetelco	Xiutetelco, Puebla	Municipal de Xiutetelco	1,000	–	Héroes de Veracruz

=== League table ===
Pos	Team	Pld	W	D	L	GF	GA	GD	BP	Pts	Qualification or relegation
1	CEFOR Cuauhtémoc Blanco	30	24	5	1	91	21	+70	1	78	Promotion play-offs
2	Lobos BUAP	30	23	3	4	78	28	+50	1	73	Promotion play-offs
3	Sultanes de Tamazunchale	30	17	8	5	78	37	+41	7	66	Promotion play-offs
4	Santos Córdoba	30	19	6	5	59	24	+35	3	66	Promotion play-offs
5	Los Ángeles	30	18	5	7	92	42	+50	1	60	Promotion play-offs
6	Albinegros de Orizaba	30	16	7	7	49	29	+20	2	57	
7	Académicos UGM	30	14	8	8	56	34	+22	5	55	
8	Anlesjeroka	28	13	9	6	43	32	+11	6	54	
9	Atlético Hidalgo	30	12	4	14	55	45	+10	2	42	
10	Star Club	30	10	7	13	41	51	−10	4	41	
11	Linces de Tlaxcala	30	9	9	12	52	50	+2	3	39	
12	Puebla SAI	30	7	7	16	36	54	−18	5	33	
13	Deportivo Ixmiquilpan	30	4	3	23	24	102	−78	2	17	
14	Xiutetelco	30	4	4	22	25	95	−70	0	16	
15	Leones de Huauchinango	30	3	1	26	20	96	−76	1	11	
16	Reales de Puebla	30	2	2	26	23	82	−59	2	10	

Source: Tercera División FMF

== Group 4 ==
Group with 18 teams from Greater Mexico City.

=== Teams ===
Location of teams in the 2016–17 3ra División Group 4 (Greater Mexico City urban area)
Location of teams in the 2014–15 3ra División Group 4 (Greater Mexico City rural area)

Team	City	Home ground	Capacity	Affiliate	Official name
Águilas de Teotihuacán	Teotihuacán, State of Mexico	Municipal Acolman	1,000	–	–
Álamos	Venustiano Carranza, Mexico City	Magdalena Mixhuca Sports City	500	–	–
Alebrijes de Oaxaca	Huixquilucan de Degollado, State of Mexico	Alberto Pérez Navarro	3,000	Alebrijes de Oaxaca	–
Ángeles de la Ciudad	Iztacalco, Mexico City	Jesús Martínez "Palillo"	6,000	–	–
Coyotes Neza	Ciudad Nezahualcóyotl, State of Mexico	Deportivo Soraya Jiménez	1,000	–	–
Deportivo Iztacalco	Chapa de Mota, State of Mexico	Unidad Deportiva Chapa de Mota	1,000	–	–
Dragones de Xochimilco	Xochimilco, Mexico City	Valentín González	5,000	–	–
Helénico	Iztacalco, Mexico City	Magdalena Mixhuca Sports City	500	–	Novillos Neza
Lobos Unión Neza	Ciudad Nezahualcóyotl, State of Mexico	Deportivo Francisco I. Madero	2,000	–	–
Marina	Xochimilco, Mexico City	Valentín González	5,000	–	–
Morelos Ecatepec	Ecatepec, State of Mexico	Adolfo López Mateos	500	–	–
Pachuca Aragón GAM	Gustavo A. Madero, Mexico City	Deportivo Francisco Zarco	500	Pachuca	Azules de la Sección 26
Politécnico	Gustavo A. Madero, Mexico City	Jesús Martínez "Palillo"	6,000	–	–
Real Olmeca Sport	Iztacalco, Mexico City	Magdalena Mixhuca Sports City	500	–	–
San José del Arenal	Chalco, State of Mexico	José Carbajal García	1,000	–	–
Santa Rosa	Xochimilco, Mexico City	San Isidro	1,000	–	–
Sporting Canamy	Iztapalapa, Mexico City	Deportivo Francisco I. Madero	2,000	–	–
Tecamachalco Sur	Huixquilucan de Degollado, State of Mexico	Alberto Pérez Navarro	3,000	–	Ajax Jiutepec

=== League table ===
Pos	Team	Pld	W	D	L	GF	GA	GD	BP	Pts	Qualification or relegation
1	Sporting Canamy	34	26	7	1	95	22	+73	6	91	Promotion play-offs
2	Ángeles de la Ciudad	34	23	7	4	86	36	+50	1	77	Promotion play-offs
3	Dragones de Xochimilco	34	22	6	6	70	36	+34	3	75	Promotion play-offs
4	Marina	34	19	9	6	76	41	+35	7	73	Promotion play-offs
5	Pachuca Aragón GAM	34	20	6	8	77	30	+47	6	72	Promotion play-offs
6	Real Olmeca Sport	34	18	8	8	62	44	+18	5	67	
7	Santa Rosa	34	18	4	12	56	42	+14	0	58	
8	Alebrijes de Oaxaca	34	15	6	13	83	55	+28	1	52	
9	Álamos	34	13	6	15	57	48	+9	3	48	
10	San José del Arenal	34	10	10	14	49	64	−15	7	47	
11	Morelos Ecatepec	34	11	9	14	41	52	−11	5	47	
12	Lobos Unión Neza	34	8	10	16	28	44	−16	7	41	
13	Tecamachalco Sur	34	7	9	18	30	63	−33	5	35	
14	Deportivo Iztacalco	34	9	6	19	37	79	−42	1	34	
15	Politécnico	34	5	12	17	30	58	−28	4	31	
16	Águilas de Teotihuacán	34	4	10	20	39	90	−51	5	27	
17	Coyotes Neza	34	7	2	25	38	87	−49	0	23	
18	Helénico	34	5	5	24	34	97	−63	0	20	

Source: Tercera División FMF

== Group 5 ==
Group with 17 teams from Guerrero and State of Mexico.

Location of teams in the 2014–15 3ra División Group 5

=== Teams ===
Team	City	Home ground	Capacity	Affiliate	Official name
Atlético CACSA	Metepec, State of Mexico	Unidad Cultural SNTE	500	–	Manchester Metepec
Atlético Naucalpan	Naucalpan, State of Mexico	Unidad Cuauhtémoc	1,500	–	–
Atlético UEFA	Coacalco, State of Mexico	Campos Fragoso	500	–	–
Deportivo Vallesano	Valle de Bravo, State of Mexico	La Capilla	1,000	–	–
Estudiantes de Atlacomulco	Atlacomulco, State of Mexico	Ignacio Pichardo Pagaza	2,000	–	–
Fuerza Mazahua	Atlacomulco, State of Mexico	Ignacio Pichardo Pagaza	2,000	–	–
Futcenter	Tlalnepantla de Baz, State of Mexico	Deportivo Santa Cecilia	1,000	–	–
Gladiadores Calentanos	Arcelia, Guerrero	Unidad Deportiva Emperador Cuauhtémoc	4,000	–	Leones de Lomar
Grupo Sherwood	Ixtapan de la Sal, State of Mexico	Ixtapan 90	2,000	–	–
Guerreros de Tierra Caliente	Ciudad Altamirano, Guerrero	Rogelio García	1,000	–	–
Jilotepec	Jilotepec, State of Mexico	Rubén Chávez Chávez	2,000	–	–
Metepec	Metepec, State of Mexico	Cancha Arqueros FC	1,000	–	–
Potros UAEM	Toluca, State of Mexico	Alberto "Chivo" Córdoba	32,603	Potros UAEM	–
Real Halcones	Atizapán de Zaragoza, State of Mexico	Deportivo Ana Gabriela Guevara	2,500	–	–
Tejupilco	Tejupilco, State of Mexico	Unidad Deportiva Tejupilco	1,000	–	–
Tolcayuca	Cuautitlán, State of Mexico	Los Pinos	5,000	–	–
Tulyehualco	Melchor Ocampo, State of Mexico	Deportivo Bicentenario	1,000	–	–

=== League table ===
Pos	Team	Pld	W	D	L	GF	GA	GD	BP	Pts	Qualification or relegation
1	Potros UAEM	32	27	5	0	105	15	+90	2	88	Promotion play-offs
2	Gladiadores Calentanos	32	26	6	0	102	15	+87	1	85	Promotion play-offs
3	Jilotepec	32	20	3	9	65	22	+43	1	64	Promotion play-offs
4	Deportivo Vallesano	32	18	5	9	51	41	+10	3	62	Promotion play-offs
5	Metepec	32	14	11	7	72	48	+24	7	60	Promotion play-offs
6	Atlético CACSA	32	15	9	8	39	24	+15	6	60	
7	Estudiantes de Atlacomulco	32	14	8	10	61	37	+24	6	56	
8	Atlético Naucalpan	32	13	11	8	46	35	+11	4	54	
9	Real Halcones	32	11	6	15	53	54	−1	2	41	
10	Futcenter	32	10	6	16	41	58	−17	4	40	
11	Guerreros de Tierra Caliente	32	10	6	16	59	69	−10	2	38	
12	Tolcayuca	32	11	4	17	37	62	−25	1	38	
13	Atlético UEFA	32	10	4	18	40	56	−16	3	37	
14	Tejupilco	32	10	4	18	47	76	−29	1	35	
15	Tulyehualco	32	5	7	20	22	81	−59	4	26	
16	Grupo Sherwood	32	5	5	22	28	79	−51	3	23	
17	Fuerza Mazahua	32	2	2	28	27	123	−96	1	9	

Source: Tercera División FMF

== Group 6 ==
Group with 14 teams from Guerrero, Morelos, Oaxaca, Puebla and Tlaxcala.

=== Teams ===
Location of teams in the 2014–15 3ra División Group 6 (Morelos)
Location of teams in the 2015–16 3ra División Group 6 (Guerrero)
Location of teams in the 2015–16 3ra División Group 6 (Puebla and Tlaxcala)
Location of teams in the 2014–15 3ra División Group 3 (Oaxaca)

Team	City	Home ground	Capacity	Affiliate	Official name
Acapulco	Acapulco, Guerrero	Hugo Sánchez	6,000	–	–
Alacranes de Puente de Ixtla	Puente de Ixtla, Morelos	Lino Espín	3,000	–	–
Alpha	Puebla City, Puebla	Club Alpha 3	3,000	–	–
Atlético Cuernavaca	Cuernavaca, Morelos	Centenario	14,500	–	–
Ballenas Galeana Morelos	Mazatepec, Morelos	Unidad Deportiva Mazatepec	1,000	–	–
Bravos de Chilpancingo	Chilpancingo, Guerrero	Unidad Deportiva CREA	1,000	–	Vikingos de Chalco
Chilpancingo	Chilpancingo, Guerrero	Polideportivo Chilpancingo	1,000	–	–
Guerreros de Yecapixtla	Yecapixtla, Morelos	Fidel Díaz Vera	1,000	–	–
Iguala	Iguala, Guerrero	Unidad Deportiva Iguala	4,000	–	–
Real Acapulco	Acapulco, Guerrero	Unidad Deportiva Acapulco	13,000	–	Texcoco
Real San Cosme	Tlaxcala City, Tlaxcala	Víctor Ruíz	1,000	–	–
Selva Cañera	Zacatepec, Morelos	IMSS Zacatepec	1,000	–	–
SEP Puebla	Puebla City, Puebla	Unidad Deportiva Mario Vázquez Raña	800	–	–
Tigrillos Dorados MRCI	San Jerónimo Tlacochahuaya, Oaxaca	Campo Independiente MRCI	3,000	–	–

=== League table ===
Pos	Team	Pld	W	D	L	GF	GA	GD	BP	Pts	Qualification or relegation
1	Tigrillos Dorados MRCI	26	21	0	5	85	25	+60	0	63	Promotion play-offs
2	SEP Puebla	26	19	2	5	72	33	+39	2	61	Promotion play-offs
3	Selva Cañera	26	14	9	3	64	28	+36	5	56	Promotion play-offs
4	Chilpancingo	26	15	3	8	61	37	+24	1	49	Promotion play-offs
5	Atlético Cuernavaca	26	14	2	10	67	40	+27	2	46	
6	Ballenas Galeana Morelos	26	13	4	9	57	38	+19	3	46	
7	Acapulco	26	14	2	10	46	29	+17	0	44	
8	Alpha	26	13	3	10	63	48	+15	2	44	
9	Guerreros de Yecapixtla	26	8	8	10	47	42	+5	5	37	
10	Iguala	26	9	5	12	37	60	−23	1	33	
11	Real San Cosme	26	8	3	15	44	51	−7	1	28	
12	Real Acapulco	26	5	6	15	40	60	−20	1	22	
13	Alacranes de Puente de Ixtla	26	5	1	20	35	84	−49	1	17	
14	Bravos de Chilpancingo	26	0	0	26	14	157	−143	0	0	

Source: Tercera División FMF

== Group 7 ==
Group with 17 teams from Greater Mexico City and Hidalgo.

=== Teams ===
Location of teams in the 2014–15 3ra División Group 7 (Hidalgo)
Location of teams in the 2014–15 3ra División Group 7 (Greater Mexico City)

Team	City	Home ground	Capacity	Affiliate	Official name
Alto Rendimiento Tuzo	San Agustín Tlaxiaca, Hidalgo	Universidad del Fútbol	1,000	Pachuca	–
Atlético de Madrid	Tlalpan, Mexico City	Centro Social y Deportivo Rosario Iglesias	6,000	Atlético Madrid	–
Atlético San Juan de Aragón	Papalotla, State of Mexico	Deportivo Municipal Papalotla	500	–	–
Buendía	Iztacalco, Mexico City	Magdalena Mixhuca Sports City	500	–	–
Cruz Azul Jasso	Ciudad Cooperativa Cruz Azul, Hidalgo	Estadio 10 de Diciembre	17,000	Cruz Azul	–
Escuela de Alto Rendimiento	Huixquilucan de Degollado, State of Mexico	Universidad Anáhuac México Norte	300	–	–
Frailes Homape	Xochimilco, Mexico City	San Isidro	1,000	–	–
Halcones del Valle del Mezquital	Cuautitlán, State of Mexico	Los Pinos	5,000	–	–
Hidalguense	Pachuca, Hidalgo	Club Hidalguense	600	–	–
Independiente Mexiquense	Tlalnepantla de Baz, State of Mexico	Deportivo Municipal	1,000	–	–
Jardon Fut Soccer	Iztapalapa, Mexico City	Deportivo Leandro Valle	1,500	–	–
Proyecto Nuevo Chimalhuacán	Chimalhuacán, State of Mexico	Tepalcates	5,000	Nuevo Chimalhuacán	–
Promodep Central	Cuautitlán, State of Mexico	Los Pinos	5,000	–	–
Pumas 201	Coyoacán, Mexico City	Tempiluli Campo 4	500	Pumas UNAM	–
Santiago Tulantepec	Santiago Tulantepec, Hidalgo	Unidad Deportiva Conrado Muntane	1,000	–	–
Unión Acolman	Acolman, State of Mexico	San Carlos Tepexpan	1,200	–	–
Universidad del Fútbol	San Agustín Tlaxiaca, Hidalgo	Universidad del Fútbol	1,000	Pachuca	–

=== League table ===
Pos	Team	Pld	W	D	L	GF	GA	GD	BP	Pts	Qualification or relegation
1	Cruz Azul Jasso	32	28	1	3	163	20	+143	1	86	Reserve teams play-offs
2	Alto Rendimiento Tuzo	32	28	2	2	90	11	+79	0	86	Reserve teams play-offs
3	Escuela de Alto Rendimiento	32	24	4	4	83	31	+52	3	79	Promotion play-offs
4	Atlético de Madrid	32	21	4	7	77	39	+38	2	69	Promotion play-offs
5	Hidalguense	32	18	6	8	59	40	+19	3	63	Promotion play-offs
6	Proyecto Nuevo Chimalhuacán	32	13	7	12	55	44	+11	4	50	Promotion play-offs
7	Independiente Mexiquense	32	13	7	12	53	42	+11	3	49	Promotion play-offs
8	Buendía	32	11	7	14	38	51	−13	6	46	
9	Jardon Fut Soccer	32	10	6	16	40	61	−21	4	40	
10	Santiago Tulantepec	32	11	5	16	41	71	−30	2	40	
11	Unión Acolman	32	8	10	14	32	62	−30	4	38	
12	Atlético San Juan de Aragón	32	9	7	16	43	69	−26	3	37	
13	Universidad del Fútbol	32	8	5	19	35	78	−43	3	32	
14	Pumas 201	32	7	5	20	27	76	−49	2	28	
15	Promodep Central	32	6	7	19	42	84	−42	2	27	
16	Halcones del Valle del Mezquital	32	6	4	22	31	76	−45	2	24	
17	Frailes Homape	32	3	9	20	22	76	−54	0	18	

Source: Tercera División FMF

== Group 8 ==
Group with 16 teams from Guanajuato, Michoacán and Querétaro.

=== Teams ===
Location of teams in the 2014–15 3ra División Group 8 (Guanajuato and Querétaro)
Location of teams in the 2014–15 3ra División Group 8 (Michoacán)

Team	City	Home ground	Capacity	Affiliate	Official name
Amealco	Amealco de Bonfil, Querétaro	Bicentenario	1,000	–	–
Atlético Colón	Colón, Querétaro	Unidad Deportiva Javier Salinas Guevara	1,000	–	Atlético Iztacalco
Celaya	Celaya, Guanajuato	Instituto Tecnológico Celaya	1,000	Celaya	–
Delfines de Abasolo	Abasolo, Guanajuato	Municipal de Abasolo	2,500	–	–
Deportivo Corregidora	Corregidora, Querétaro	F.C. Total	1,000	–	–
Guitarreros de Paracho	Paracho, Michoacán	Municipal de Paracho	2,000	–	Monarcas Zacapu
Jaral del Progreso	Jaral del Progreso, Guanajuato	Unidad Deportiva Municipal	1,000	–	–
Limoneros de Apatzingán	Apatzingán, Michoacán	Unidad Deportiva Adolfo López Mateos	5,000	Monarcas Morelia	–
Originales Aguacateros	Uruapan, Michoacán	Unidad Deportiva Hermanos López Rayón	5,000	–	–
Querétaro	Querétaro, Querétaro	Parque Bicentenario	1,000	Querétaro	–
Salamanca	Salamanca, Guanajuato	El Molinito	2,500	–	–
Tigres Blancos Gestalt	Morelia, Michoacán	Venustiano Carranza	22,000	–	–
Toros de Tequisquiapan	Tequisquiapan, Querétaro	Unidad Deportiva Emiliano Zapata	1,000	–	–
Tota Carbajal	León, Guanajuato	Club Cabezas Rojas	1,000	–	Cabezas Rojas
CDU Uruapan	Uruapan, Michoacán	Unidad Deportiva Hermanos López Rayón	5,000	CDU Uruapan	–
Villagrán	Villagrán, Guanajuato	Unidad Deportiva Norte	1,000	–	–

=== League table ===
Pos	Team	Pld	W	D	L	GF	GA	GD	BP	Pts	Qualification or relegation
1	Salamanca	30	23	5	2	91	23	+68	2	76	Promotion play-offs
2	CDU Uruapan	30	22	4	4	97	25	+72	2	72	Promotion play-offs
3	Limoneros de Apatzingán	30	19	7	4	57	20	+37	4	68	Promotion play-offs
4	Delfines de Abasolo	30	17	7	6	72	34	+38	3	61	Promotion play-offs
5	Originales Aguacateros de Uruapan	30	13	11	6	44	19	+25	8	58	
6	Deportivo Corregidora	30	17	3	10	69	45	+24	1	55	
7	Guitarreros de Paracho	30	14	6	10	44	45	−1	2	50	
8	Tigres Blancos Gestalt	30	13	6	11	49	46	+3	4	49	
9	Celaya	30	12	8	10	50	35	+15	4	48	
10	Villagrán	30	13	3	14	48	51	−3	3	45	
11	Tota Carbajal	30	11	3	16	36	57	−21	0	36	
12	Querétaro	30	9	5	16	28	39	−11	2	34	
13	Jaral del Progreso	30	8	5	17	30	59	−29	1	30	
14	Toros de Tequisquiapan	30	6	2	22	32	86	−54	1	21	
15	Amealco	30	1	5	24	25	95	−70	3	11	
16	Atlético Colón	30	0	4	26	27	120	−93	2	6	

Source: Tercera División FMF

== Group 9 ==
Group with 18 teams from Aguascalientes, Guanajuato, Jalisco, Michoacán and Zacatecas.

=== Teams ===
Location of teams in the 2014–15 3ra División Group 9 (Guanajuato and Michoacán)
Location of teams in the 2014–15 3ra División Group 9 (Aguascalientes and Zacatecas)
Location of teams in the 2015–16 3ra División Group 9 (Jalisco)

Team	City	Home ground	Capacity	Affiliate	Official name
Abejas de Rincón de Romos	Rincón de Romos, Aguascalientes	Luis Javier Ramírez	1,000	–	–
Águilas Reales de Zacatecas	Zacatecas City, Zacatecas	Francisco Villa	13,000	–	–
Alcaldes de Lagos	Lagos de Moreno, Jalisco	Salvador "Chava" Reyes	2,500	–	–
Apaseo el Alto	Apaseo el Alto, Guanajuato	Unidad Deportiva Manuel Ávila Camacho	1,000	–	–
Arandas	Arandas, Jalisco	Unidad Deportiva Gustavo Díaz Ordaz	1,000	–	–
Atlético ECCA	León, Guanajuato	Lalo Gutiérrez	1,000	–	–
Atlético Huejutla	Morelos, Zacatecas	Unidad Deportiva Minera Madero	1,000	–	–
Atlético San Francisco	San Francisco del Rincón, Guanajuato	Domingo Velázquez	3,500	–	–
Cabezas Rojas	León, Guanajuato	Club Cabezas Rojas	1,000	–	–
Deportivo Los Altos	San José de Gracia, Jalisco	Unidad Deportiva San José de Gracia	1,000	Deportivo Los Altos	–
La Piedad	La Piedad, Michoacán	Juan N. López	13,356	La Piedad	Libertadores de Pénjamo
León Independiente	Guanajuato City, Guanajuato	Unidad Deportiva Juan José Torres Landa	1,000	–	–
Mineros de Fresnillo	Fresnillo, Zacatecas	Minera Fresnillo	6,000	Mineros de Fresnillo	–
Real Aguascalientes	Aguascalientes, Aguascalientes	Centro Deportivo Ferrocarrilero Tres Centurias	1,000	–	–
Real Leonés	León, Guanajuato	Club Empress	500	–	–
Tlajomulco	Tlajomulco de Zúñiga, Jalisco	Unidad Deportiva Mariano Otero	3,000	–	–
Tuzos UAZ	Zacatecas, Zacatecas	Universitario Unidad Deportiva Norte	5,000	Tuzos UAZ	–
Unión León	León, Guanajuato	Club Empress	500	–	–

=== League table ===
Pos	Team	Pld	W	D	L	GF	GA	GD	BP	Pts	Qualification or relegation
1	Atlético San Francisco	34	25	6	3	110	25	+85	6	87	Promotion play-offs
2	Deportivo Los Altos	34	25	7	2	107	24	+83	2	84	Promotion play-offs
3	Tuzos UAZ	34	25	3	6	108	36	+72	2	80	Promotion play-offs
4	Águilas Reales de Zacatecas	34	19	12	3	69	25	+44	7	76	Promotion play-offs
5	Atlético ECCA	34	20	7	7	67	31	+36	4	71	Promotion play-offs
6	Tlajomulco	34	18	6	10	55	36	+19	3	63	
7	Real Leonés	34	19	3	12	78	47	+31	2	62	
8	Alcaldes de Lagos	34	17	5	12	72	59	+13	2	58	
9	La Piedad	34	15	3	16	58	68	−10	2	50	
10	Mineros de Fresnillo	34	14	3	17	54	61	−7	3	48	
11	Real Aguascalientes	34	12	5	17	34	47	−13	4	45	
12	León Independiente	34	14	2	18	63	83	−20	1	45	
13	Atlético Huejutla	34	9	8	17	38	59	−21	1	36	
14	Arandas	34	8	6	20	40	71	−31	2	32	
15	Apaseo el Alto	34	8	3	23	29	83	−54	1	28	
16	Cabezas Rojas	34	4	5	25	26	104	−78	2	19	
17	Unión León	34	4	5	25	22	95	−73	1	18	
18	Abejas de Rincón de Romos	34	4	3	27	36	112	−76	1	16	

Source: Tercera División FMF

== Group 10 ==
Group with 20 teams from Colima, Jalisco and Michoacán.

=== Teams ===
Location of teams in the 2014–15 3ra División Group 10

Team	City	Home ground	Capacity	Affiliate	Official name
Aduaneros de Manzanillo	Manzanillo, Colima	Unidad Deportiva 5 de Mayo	1,000	–	Volcanes de Colima
Atlético Tecomán	Tecomán, Colima	Víctor Eduardo Sevilla Torres	2,000	–	–
Autlán	Autlán, Jalisco	Unidad Deportiva Chapultepec	1,500	–	–
Aves Blancas	Tepatitlán de Morelos, Jalisco	Corredor Industrial	1,200	–	–
Charales de Chapala	Chapala, Jalisco	Municipal Juan Rayo	1,000	–	–
Comala Pueblo Mágico	Comala, Colima	Unidad Deportiva Mary Villa Montero	1,000	–	–
Conejos Tuxpan	Tuxpan, Jalisco	Unidad Deportiva Municipal	1,000	–	–
Escuela de Fútbol Chivas	Zapopan, Jalisco	Chivas San Rafael	500	Guadalajara	–
Mamuts de El Salto	El Salto, Jalisco	De los Mamuts	1,000	–	–
Nuevo México	Nuevo México, Jalisco	Club Deportivo Occidente	1,000	–	–
Nuevos Valores de Ocotlán	Ocotlán, Jalisco	Municipal Benito Juárez	1,500	Leones Negros UdeG	–
Oro	Zapopan, Jalisco	Campo Oro	1,000	–	–
Palmeros	Colima City, Colima	Colima	12,000	–	Deportivo Colegio Guanajuato
Queseros de San José	San José de Gracia, Michoacán	Juanito Chávez	1,500	–	–
Sahuayo	Sahuayo, Michoacán	Unidad Deportiva Municipal	1,500	Sahuayo	–
Tepatitlán	Tepatitlán, Jalisco	Gregorio "Tepa" Gómez	10,000	Tepatitlán	–
Valle del Grullo	Tlaquepaque, Jalisco	Deportivo Diablos Tesistán	1,000	–	–
Tuzos Occidente	Tlaquepaque, Jalisco	Deportivo Diablos Tesistán	1,000	Pachuca	Atlético Cocula
Vaqueros	Tlaquepaque, Jalisco	Club Vaqueros Ixtlán	1,000	–	–
Vaqueros Bellavista	Acatlán de Juárez, Jalisco	Juan Bigotón Jasso	1,500	–	–

=== League table ===
Pos	Team	Pld	W	D	L	GF	GA	GD	BP	Pts	Qualification or relegation
1	Vaqueros Bellavista	38	22	12	4	64	27	+37	7	85	Promotion play-offs
2	Tepatitlán	38	24	7	7	89	34	+55	5	84	Promotion play-offs
3	Aves Blancas	38	24	7	7	75	40	+35	4	83	Promotion play-offs
4	Atlético Tecomán	38	22	11	5	82	41	+41	3	80	Promotion play-offs
5	Autlán	38	23	6	9	87	46	+41	2	77	
6	Nuevos Valores de Ocotlán	38	21	8	9	69	34	+35	5	76	Promotion play-offs
7	Escuela de Fútbol Chivas	38	19	10	9	75	45	+30	7	74	
8	Palmeros	38	19	10	9	83	55	+28	7	74	
9	Charales de Chapala	38	19	8	11	58	48	+10	4	69	
10	Comala Pueblo Mágico	38	16	6	16	60	52	+8	2	56	
11	Tuzos Occidente	38	13	11	14	66	68	−2	4	54	
12	Nuevo México	38	12	10	16	49	61	−12	5	51	
13	Sahuayo	38	11	11	16	51	58	−7	3	47	
14	Vaqueros	38	12	6	20	52	64	−12	4	46	
15	Queseros de San José	38	11	6	21	50	73	−23	3	42	
16	Mamuts de El Salto	38	8	11	19	42	68	−26	5	40	
17	Aduaneros de Manzanillo	38	8	6	24	43	76	−33	5	35	
18	Conejos Tuxpan	38	5	11	22	47	91	−44	6	32	
19	Valle del Grullo	38	6	3	29	33	123	−90	0	21	
20	Oro	38	2	6	30	27	98	−71	2	14	

Source: Tercera División FMF

== Group 11 ==
Group with 20 teams from Jalisco and Nayarit.

=== Teams ===
Location of teams in the 2014–15 3ra División Group 11 (Jalisco and Nayarit)

Team	City	Home ground	Capacity	Affiliate	Official name
Academia Marco Fabián	Zapopan, Jalisco	Metrogol Parque Metropolitano	800	–	Colegio Albert Schweitzer
Atlas	Zapopan, Jalisco	CECAF	1,000	Atlas	–
Atlético La Mina	Tepic, Nayarit	Olímpico Santa Teresita	4,000	–	–
Atotonilco	Atotonilco El Alto, Jalisco	Club Chivas San Rafael	800	–	–
Cazcanes de Ameca	Ameca, Jalisco	Núcleo Deportivo y de Espectáculos Ameca	4,000	–	–
Coras	Tepic, Nayarit	Olímpico Santa Teresita	4,000	Coras	–
Deportivo Talpa	Talpa de Allende, Jalisco	Unidad Deportiva Halcón Peña	1,000	–	–
Deportivo Tomates	Tomatlán, Jalisco	Alejandro Ruelas Ibarra	1,000	–	–
Dynamo Cocula	Zapopan, Jalisco	Club Deportivo La Primavera	3,000	–	–
Guadalajara	Zapopan, Jalisco	Verde Valle	800	Guadalajara	–
Hipocampos Vallarta	Puerto Vallarta, Jalisco	La Preciosa	2,000	–	–
Juventud Unida	Tlajomulco de Zúñiga, Jalisco	Club Desspeja	1,000	–	–
Lagartos UAN	Tepic, Nayarit	Olímpico UAN	3,000	–	–
Leones Negros UdeG	Zapopan, Jalisco	Club Deportivo La Primavera	3,000	Leones Negros UdeG	–
Lobos de Zihuatanejo	Zapopan, Jalisco	Club Deportivo Occidente	1,000	–	–
Mineros de Zacatecas	Zapopan, Jalisco	Tres de Marzo	18,779	Mineros de Zacatecas	–
Nacional	Guadalajara, Jalisco	Club Deportivo Occidente	1,000	–	–
Potros de Bahía de Banderas	Bahía de Banderas, Nayarit	Unidad Deportiva San José del Valle	4,000	–	–
Revolucionarios	Tlaquepaque, Jalisco	Tlaquepaque	1,360	–	–
Xalisco	Xalisco, Nayarit	Unidad Deportiva Landereñas	500	–	–

=== League table ===
Pos	Team	Pld	W	D	L	GF	GA	GD	BP	Pts	Qualification or relegation
1	Mineros de Zacatecas	38	30	6	2	135	26	+109	4	100	Reserve teams play-offs
2	Atlas	38	28	5	5	90	23	+67	3	92	Reserve teams play-offs
3	Guadalajara	38	29	2	7	102	32	+70	0	89	Reserve teams play-offs
4	Xalisco	38	26	6	6	87	29	+58	3	87	Promotion play-offs
5	Cazcanes de Ameca	38	19	11	8	97	54	+43	5	73	Promotion play-offs
6	Atotonilco	38	19	8	11	101	49	+52	6	71	Promotion play-offs
7	Academia Marco Fabián	38	18	11	9	87	51	+36	6	71	Promotion play-offs
8	Lagartos UAN	38	17	10	11	65	49	+16	8	69	Promotion play-offs
9	Leones Negros UdeG	38	18	8	12	79	55	+24	5	67	
10	Coras	38	16	11	11	72	44	+28	7	66	
11	Nacional	38	20	3	15	81	52	+29	1	64	
12	Deportivo Tomates	38	16	3	19	56	90	−34	2	53	
13	Dynamo Cocula	38	14	6	18	89	72	+17	1	49	
14	Juventud Unida	38	13	5	20	50	68	−18	2	46	
15	Hipocampos Vallarta	38	9	6	23	67	94	−27	0	33	
16	Atlético La Mina	38	7	9	22	37	96	−59	3	33	
17	Lobos de Zihuatanejo	38	5	8	25	25	77	−52	5	28	
18	Deportivo Talpa	38	6	4	28	21	110	−89	2	24	
19	Potros de Bahía de Banderas	38	6	2	30	29	127	−98	0	20	
20	Revolucionarios	38	1	2	35	24	199	−175	0	5	

Source: Tercera División FMF

== Group 12 ==
Group with 15 teams from Coahuila, Nuevo León, San Luis Potosí, Tamaulipas and Veracruz.

=== Teams ===
Location of teams in the 2015–16 3ra División Group 12 (Tamasopo, S.L.P., Tamaulipas and Veracruz)
Location of teams in the 2015–16 3ra División Group 12 (Coahuila, Matehuala, S.L.P and Nuevo León)

Team	City	Home ground	Capacity	Affiliate	Official name
Águilas de Pánuco	Pánuco, Veracruz	Municipal Pánuco	1,000	–	–
Atlético Altamira	Altamira, Tamaulipas	Lázaro Cárdenas	2,500	–	–
Bravos de Nuevo Laredo	Nuevo Laredo, Tamaulipas	Unidad Deportiva Benito Juárez	5,000	–	–
Canteranos Altamira	Altamira, Tamaulipas	Altamira	13,500	Altamira	–
Correcaminos UAT	Ciudad Victoria, Tamaulipas	Universitario Eugenio Alvizo Porras	5,000	Correcaminos UAT	–
Ho Gar Matamoros	Matamoros, Tamaulipas	Pedro Salazar Maldonado	3,000	–	Ho Gar H. Matamoros
Jaguares de Nuevo León	San Nicolás de los Garza, Nuevo León	Unidad Deportiva Oriente	1,000	–	–
Monterrey	Monterrey, Nuevo León	El Cerrito	1,000	Monterrey	–
Panteras Negras GNL	Guadalupe, Nuevo León	Unidad Deportiva La Talaverna	5,000	–	–
Tamasopo	Tamasopo, San Luis Potosí	Unidad Deportiva El Chacuaco	1,000	–	Gallos Hidrocálidos
Tampico	Tampico, Tamaulipas	Unidad Deportiva Tampico	1,500	–	Orinegros de Ciudad Madero
Tigres SD	General Zuazua, Nuevo León	La Cueva de Zuazua	800	Tigres UANL	–
Titanes de Saltillo	Saltillo, Coahuila	Olímpico Francisco I. Madero	7,000	–	Coyotes de Saltillo
Troyanos UDEM	San Pedro Garza García, Nuevo León	Universidad de Monterrey	1,000	–	–
Tuneros de Matehuala	Matehuala, San Luis Potosí	Manuel Moreno Torres	2,000	–	–

=== League table ===
Pos	Team	Pld	W	D	L	GF	GA	GD	BP	Pts	Qualification or relegation
1	Tigres SD	28	21	3	4	52	21	+31	3	69	Reserve teams play-offs
2	Monterrey	28	19	2	7	63	27	+36	1	60	Reserve teams play-offs
3	Correcaminos UAT	28	17	4	7	42	25	+17	1	56	
4	Canteranos Altamira	28	15	7	6	37	19	+18	3	55	
5	Bravos de Nuevo Laredo	28	13	9	6	40	30	+10	5	53	Promotion play-offs
6	Águilas de Pánuco	28	13	6	9	44	36	+8	5	50	Promotion play-offs
7	Tamasopo	28	13	7	8	42	25	+17	3	49	Promotion play-offs
8	Troyanos UDEM	28	10	8	10	28	25	+3	4	42	Promotion play-offs
9	Panteras Negras GNL	28	8	10	10	31	34	−3	4	38	
10	Ho Gar Matamoros	28	8	6	14	27	38	−11	5	35	
11	Tampico	28	8	5	15	30	56	−26	2	31	
12	Tuneros de Matehuala	28	6	5	17	33	70	−37	4	27	
13	Jaguares de Nuevo León	28	6	5	17	30	51	−21	2	25	
14	Atlético Altamira	28	6	5	17	23	37	−14	0	23	
15	Titanes de Saltillo	28	5	2	21	27	55	−28	0	17	

Source: Tercera División FMF

== Group 13 ==
Group with 9 teams from Baja California, Sinaloa and Sonora.

=== Teams ===
Location of teams in the 2014–15 3ra División Group 13

Team	City	Home ground	Capacity	Affiliate	Official name
Águilas UAS	Culiacán, Sinaloa	Universitario UAS	3,500	–	–
Deportivo Ensenada	Ensenada, Baja California	Municipal de Ensenada	7,600	–	–
Deportivo Navolato	Navolato, Sinaloa	Juventud	2,000	–	–
Deportivo Obregón	Ciudad Obregón, Sonora	Manuel "Piri" Sagasta	4,000	–	Generales de Navojoa
Diablos Azules de Guasave	Guasave, Sinaloa	Armando "Kory" Leyson	9,000	–	–
Guerreros La Cruz	La Cruz, Sinaloa	Juan Lauro Martínez Barreda	1,000	–	–
Héroes de Caborca	Caborca, Sonora	Fidencio Hernández	3,000	–	–
Poblado Miguel Alemán	Miguel Alemán, Sonora	Alejandro López Caballero	4,000	Cimarrones de Sonora	–
Tijuana	Tecate, Baja California	Unidad Deportiva Eufracio Santana	1,000	Tijuana	–

=== League table ===
Pos	Team	Pld	W	D	L	GF	GA	GD	BP	Pts	Qualification or relegation
1	Águilas UAS	16	11	4	1	38	14	+24	2	39	Promotion play-offs
2	Deportivo Ensenada	16	9	7	0	31	10	+21	4	38	Promotion play-offs
3	Poblado Miguel Alemán	16	10	1	5	46	28	+18	0	31	
4	Diablos Azules de Guasave	16	7	4	5	35	24	+11	2	27	Promotion play-offs
5	Deportivo Obregón	16	7	4	5	28	28	0	1	26	Promotion play-offs
6	Deportivo Navolato	16	2	7	7	16	32	−16	4	17	
7	Tijuana	16	4	2	10	14	20	−6	1	15	
8	Héroes de Caborca	16	3	4	9	15	36	−21	2	15	
9	Deportivo La Cruz	16	2	1	13	10	41	−31	1	8	

Source: Tercera División FMF

== Group 14 ==
Group with 10 teams from Chihuahua, Coahuila and Durango.

=== Teams ===
Location of teams in the 2014–15 3ra División Group 13

Team	City	Home ground	Capacity	Affiliate	Official name
Atlético Gómez Palacio	Gómez Palacio, Durango	Unidad Deportiva Francisco Gómez Palacio	4,000	–	–
Chinarras de Aldama	Aldama, Chihuahua	Ciudad Deportiva Chihuahua	4,000	–	–
Dorados de Villa	Durango City, Durango	Francisco Zarco	18,000	–	Teca Huixquilucan
La Tribu de Ciudad Juárez	Ciudad Juárez, Chihuahua	20 de Noviembre	2,500	–	–
Meloneros de Matamoros	Matamoros, Coahuila	Unidad Deportiva Creación	1,000	–	–
Real Magari	Ciudad Juárez, Chihuahua	20 de Noviembre	2,500	–	–
San Isidro Laguna	Torreón, Coahuila	San Isidro	3,000	–	–
Soles de Ciudad Juárez	Ciudad Juárez, Chihuahua	20 de Noviembre	2,500	–	–
Toros	Torreón, Coahuila	Unidad Deportiva Torreón	1,000	–	–
UACH	Chihuahua City, Chihuahua	Olímpico Universitario José Reyes Baeza	22,000	UACH	–

=== League table ===
Pos	Team	Pld	W	D	L	GF	GA	GD	BP	Pts	Qualification or relegation
1	Dorados UACH	18	10	6	2	54	25	+29	3	39	Reserve teams play-offs
2	La Tribu de Ciudad Juárez	18	10	5	3	32	17	+15	3	38	Promotion play-offs
3	San Isidro Laguna	18	10	3	5	38	28	+10	2	35	Promotion play-offs
4	Toros	18	10	2	6	24	23	+1	2	34	Promotion play-offs
5	Dorados de Villa	18	9	4	5	34	21	+13	2	33	Promotion play-offs
6	Atlético Gómez Palacio	18	7	4	7	35	29	+6	2	27	
7	Soles de Ciudad Juárez	18	8	2	8	36	34	+2	0	26	
8	Real Magari	18	4	2	12	16	35	−19	1	15	
9	Meloneros de Matamoros	18	2	6	10	12	31	−19	3	15	
10	Chinarras de Aldama	18	2	2	14	12	50	−38	0	8	

Source: Tercera División FMF

== Promotion play-offs ==
=== Round of 64 ===
Team 1	Agg.	Team 2	1st leg	2nd leg
Potros UAEM	5–0	Proyecto Nuevo Chimalhuacán	2–0	3–0
Mérida	4–2	Dragones de Tabasco	1–0	3–2
Tigrillos Dorados MRCI	3–0	Selva Cañera	2–0	1–0
Dragones de Xochimilco	0–3	Sultanes de Tamazunchale	0–2	0–1
Gladiadores Calentanos	2–1	Deportivo Vallesano	0–0	2–1
Los Ángeles	7–3	Estudiantes de San Andrés	1–2	6–1
SEP Puebla	2–3	Atlético de Madrid	1–2	1–1
Escuela de Alto Rendimiento	3–2	Jilotepec	1–1	2–1
Sporting Canamy	4–3	Chilpancingo	2–1	2–1
Atlético Veracruz	4–1	Piñeros de Loma Bonita	unk.	unk.
Mezcalapa	5–2	Limoneros de Fútbol	2–2	3–0
Chetumal (pen.)	1–1 (5–3)	Inter Playa del Carmen	0–0	1–1
Lobos BUAP	3–1	Marina	1–0	2–1
Ángeles de la Ciudad	1–3	Santos Córdoba	0–2	1–1
Cefor Cuauhtémoc Blanco	4–1	Hidalguense	2–0	2–1
Pachuca Aragón GAM (pen.)	1–1 (3–1)	Metepec	0–0	1–1
CDU Uruapan	5–4	Delfines de Abasolo	2–2	3–2
Salamanca	5–5 (3–5)	Atotonilco	2–3	3–2
Limoneros de Apatzingán	5–3	Tepatitlán	1–1	4–2
Atlético ECCA	4–1	Independiente Mexiquense	2–1	2–0
Vaqueros Bellavista (pen.)	2–2 (5–4)	Águilas Reales de Zacatecas	0–1	2–1
Aves Blancas	2–1	Xalisco	0–0	2–1
La Tribu de Ciudad Juárez	3–2	Dorados de Villa	2–1	1–1
San Isidro Laguna	0–5	Toros	0–4	0–1
Atlético San Francisco	5–2	Academia Marco Fabián	2–2	3–0
Nuevos Valores de Ocotlán	2–2 (2–4)	(pen.) Lagartos UAN	0–1	2–1
Bravos de Nuevo Laredo	1–0	Troyanos UDEM	1–0	0–0
Águilas de Pánuco	2–2 (3–4)	(pen.) Tamasopo	Unk.	Unk.
Tuzos UAZ	2–1	Atlético Tecomán	2–0	0–1
Deportivo Los Altos	5–5 (7–9)	(pen.) Cazcanes de Ameca	2–2	3–3
Deportivo Ensenada (pen.)	2–2 (3–2)	Diablos Azules de Guasave	1–0	1–2
Deportivo Obregón (pen.)	3–3 (6–5)	Águilas UAS	2–1	1–2

=== Round of 32 ===
Team 1	Agg.	Team 2	1st leg	2nd leg
Potros UAEM	3–0	Mérida	1–0	2–0
Escuela de Alto Rendimiento	2–2 (6–7)	(pen.) Atlético de Madrid	1–1	1–1
Tigrillos Dorados MRCI (pen.)	2–2 (4–2)	Sultanes de Tamazunchale	0–1	2–1
Gladiadores Calentanos	5–3	Los Ángeles	1–3	4–0
Sporting Canamy	3–1	Atlético Veracruz	unk.	unk.
Mezcalapa	5–5 (3–4)	(pen.) Chetumal	2–2	3–3
Lobos BUAP	2–1	Santos Córdoba	0–1	2–0
Cefor Cuauhtémoc Blanco	3–1	Pachuca Aragón GAM	2–0	1–1
CDU Uruapan	4–3	Atotonilco	1–1	3–2
La Tribu de Ciudad Juárez	1–3	Toros	0–0	1–3
Limoneros de Apatzingán	2–1	Atlético ECCA	0–0	2–1
Vaqueros Bellavista	3–2	Aves Blancas	2–1	1–1
Atlético San Francisco	6–2	Lagartos UAN	4–1	2–1
Bravos de Nuevo Laredo	1–2	Tamasopo	Unk.	Unk.
Deportivo Ensenada	3–3 (4–2)	Deportivo Obregón	0–1	3–2
Tuzos UAZ	0–4	Cazcanes de Ameca	0–4	0–0

=== Final stage ===
Round of 16
1S	Potros UAEM	2	0	2
8S	Atlético de Madrid	1	0	1
3S	Gladiadores Calentanos	2	1	3
6S	Tigrillos Dorados MRCI	4	1	5
2S	Sporting Canamy	1	2	3
7S	Chetumal	2	0	2
4S	Cefor Cuauhtémoc Blanco	1	1	2 (9)
5S	Lobos BUAP (pen.)	0	2	2 (10)
1N	Atlético San Francisco	0	4	4
8N	Tamasopo	1	1	2
3N	Deportivo Ensenada	2	0	2
6N	Cazcanes de Ameca	2	1	3
2N	CDU Uruapan	0	3	3
7N	Toros	1	0	1
4N	Vaqueros Bellavista (pen.)	3	1	4 (4)
5N	Limoneros de Apatzingán	2	2	4 (3)

Quarter-finals
1S	Potros UAEM	3	0	3
6S	Tigrillos Dorados MRCI	1	1	2
2S	Sporting Canamy (pen.)	1	2	3 (4)
5S	Lobos BUAP	2	1	3 (3)
1N	Atlético San Francisco	2	2	4
6N	Cazcanes de Ameca	0	0	0
2N	CDU Uruapan	0	4	4
4N	Vaqueros Bellavista	0	2	2

Semi-finals
1S	Potros UAEM	0	1	1
2S	Sporting Canamy	2	1	3
1N	Atlético San Francisco	0	3	3
2N	CDU Uruapan	2	2	4

Final
2S	Sporting Canamy	0	2	2
2N	CDU Uruapan	2	1	3

==== Round of 16 ====
Team 1	Agg.	Team 2	1st leg	2nd leg
Potros UAEM	2–1	Atlético de Madrid	2–1	0–0
Gladiadores Calentanos	3–5	Tigres Dorados MRCI	2–4	1–1
Sporting Canamy	3–2	Chetumal	1–2	20–
Cefor Cuauhtémoc Blanco	2–2 (9–10)	(pen.) Lobos BUAP	1–0	1–2
Atlético San Francisco	4–1	Tamasopo	0–1	4–1
Deportivo Ensenada	2–3	Cazcanes de Ameca	2–2	0–1
CDU Uruapan	3–1	Toros	0–1	3–0
Vaqueros Bellavista (pen.)	4–4 (4–3)	Limoneros de Apatzingán	3–2	1–2

===== First leg =====
13 May 2015	Atlético de Madrid	1–2	Potros UAEM	Mexico City
11:00	Vera 9'	Report	Medina 2'; Gutiérrez 32'	Stadium: Deportivo Rosario Iglesias; Attendance: 100

13 May 2015	Lobos BUAP	0–1	Cefor Cuauhtémoc Blanco	Puebla City
11:00		Report	Aguilar 5'	Stadium: Ciudad Universitaria de Puebla; Attendance: 100

13 May 2015	Tigrillos Dorados MRCI	4–2	Gladiadores Calentanos	San Jerónimo Tlacochahuaya
15:00	Blando 17'; Torres 19'; Zepeda 22', 59'	Report	Blancas 3'; Mendoza 36'	Stadium: Campo Independiente MRCI; Attendance: 500

13 May 2015	Tamasopo	1–0	Atlético San Francisco	Tamasopo
16:00				Stadium: Unidad Deportiva El Chacuaco

13 May 2015	Chetumal	2–1	Sporting Canamy	Chetumal
19:00	Castillo 45', 47'	Report	Martínez 41'	Stadium: Estadio 10 de Abril; Attendance: 3,000

14 May 2015	Cazcanes de Ameca	2–2	Deportivo Ensenada	Ameca
16:00	Lecourtois 40'; López 54'	Report	Covarrubias 24'; Fischer 60'	Stadium: Núcleo Deportivo y de Espectáculos Ameca; Attendance: 300

14 May 2015	Vaqueros Bellavista	3–2	Limoneros de Apatzingán	Acatlán de Juárez
17:00	Soto 12'; Aguirre 15'; Díaz 33'	Report	Del Real 14'; Martínez 90'	Stadium: Estadio Juan "Bigotón" Jasso; Attendance: 150

14 May 2015	Toros	1–0	CDU Uruapan	Torreón
19:00	Escobedo 89'	Report		Stadium: Unidad Deportiva de Torreón; Attendance: 100

===== Second leg =====
16 May 2015	Cefor Cuauhtémoc Blanco	1–2 (2–2 agg.) (9–10 p)	Lobos BUAP	Huauchinango
13:00	González 35'	Report	Álvarez 28'; Hernández 38'	Stadium: Nido Águila; Attendance: 800

16 May 2015	Sporting Canamy	2–0 (3–2 agg.)	Chetumal	Mexico City
13:00	Ramírez 33'; Ríos 82'	Report		Stadium: Deportivo Plutarco Elías Calles; Attendance: 300

16 May 2015	Gladiadores Calentanos	1–1 (3–5 agg.)	Tigrillos Dorados MRCI	Arcelia
16:00	Mendoza 40'	Report	Torres 9'	Stadium: Unidad Deportiva Cuauhtémoc; Attendance: 3,000

16 May 2015	Atlético San Francisco	4–1 (4–2 agg.)	Tamasopo	San Francisco del Rincón
17:00				Stadium: Estadio Domingo Velázquez

16 May 2015	Potros UAEM	0–0 (2–1 agg.)	Atlético de Madrid	Toluca
19:00		Report		Stadium: Estadio Universitario Alberto "Chivo" Córdoba; Attendance: 200

17 May 2015	CDU Uruapan	3–0 (3–1 agg.)	Toros	Uruapan
12:00	López 23'; Chávez 35', 73'	Report		Stadium: Unidad Deportiva Hermanos López Rayón; Attendance: 1,100

17 May 2015	Deportivo Ensenada	0–1 (2–3 agg.)	Cazcanes de Ameca	Ensenada
14:00		Report	Ramírez 12'	Stadium: Estadio Municipal de Ensenada; Attendance: 1,500

17 May 2015	Limoneros de Apatzingán	2–1 (4–4 agg.) (3–4 p)	Vaqueros Bellavista	Apatzingán
15:00	Bejarano 24'; Chávez 64'	Report	Bustamante 85'	Stadium: Unidad Deportiva Adolfo López Mateos; Attendance: 500

==== Quarter-finals ====
Team 1	Agg.	Team 2	1st leg	2nd leg
Potros UAEM	3–2	Tigrillos Dorados MRCI	3–1	0–1
Sporting Canamy (pen.)	3–3 (4–3)	Lobos BUAP	1–2	2–1
Atlético San Francisco	4–0	Cazcanes de Ameca	2–0	2–0
CDU Uruapan	4–2	Vaqueros Bellavista	0–0	4–2

===== First leg =====
20 May 2015	Tigrillos Dorados MRCI	1–3	Potros UAEM	San Jerónimo Tlacochahuaya
15:00	Zepeda 13'	Report	Villegas 58'; Zaragoza 66'; Jaime 80'	Stadium: Campo Independiente MRCI; Attendance: 1,000

20 May 2015	Lobos BUAP	2–1	Sporting Canamy	Puebla City
15:00	Hernández 11'; Navarrete 75'	Report	Ríos 89'	Stadium: Ciudad Universitaria BUAP; Attendance: 500

20 May 2015	Cazcanes de Ameca	0–2	Atlético San Francisco	Ameca
16:00		Report	Martínez 5', 86'	Stadium: Núcleo Deportivo y de Espectáculos Ameca; Attendance: 300

21 May 2015	Vaqueros Bellavista	0–0	CDU Uruapan	Acatlán de Juárez
15:00		Report		Stadium: Estadio Juan "Bigotón" Jasso; Attendance: 250

===== Second leg =====
23 May 2015	Sporting Canamy	2–1 (3–3 agg.) (4–3 p)	Lobos BUAP	Mexico City
13:00	Figueroa 34', 75'	Report	Carmona 63'	Stadium: Deportivo Plutarco Elías Calles; Attendance: 1,000

23 May 2015	Atlético San Francisco	2–0 (4–0 agg.)	Cazcanes de Ameca	San Francisco del Rincón
17:00	Mesillas 3'; Ramírez 87'	Report		Stadium: Estadio Domingo Velázquez; Attendance: 800

23 May 2015	Potros UAEM	0–1 (3–2 agg.)	Tigrillos Dorados MRCI	Toluca
19:00		Report	Bonilla 77'	Stadium: Estadio Universitario Alberto "Chivo" Córdoba; Attendance: 800

24 May 2015	CDU Uruapan	4–2 (4–2 agg.)	Vaqueros Bellavista	Uruapan
12:00	Galván 8', 42'; Chávez 36'; Montaño 59'	Report	González 50'; Soto 90'	Stadium: Unidad Deportiva Hermanos López Rayón; Attendance: 1,500

==== Semi-finals ====
Team 1	Agg.	Team 2	1st leg	2nd leg
Potros UAEM	1–3	Sporting Canamy	0–2	1–1
Atlético San Francisco	3–4	CDU Uruapan	0–2	3–2

===== First leg =====
27 May 2015	Sporting Canamy	2–0	Potros UAEM	Mexico City
13:00	Maya 44' (own); Cortés 85'	Report		Stadium: Deportivo Plutarco Elías Calles; Attendance: 800

27 May 2015	CDU Uruapan	2–0	Atlético San Francisco	Uruapan
17:00	Galván 36'; Menera 79'	Report		Stadium: Unidad Deportiva Hermanos López Rayón; Attendance: 3,500

===== Second leg =====
30 May 2015	Potros UAEM	1–1 (1–3 agg.)	Sporting Canamy	Toluca
11:00	Villalva 6'	Report	Figueroa 34'	Stadium: Estadio Universitario Alberto "Chivo" Córdoba; Attendance: 1,500

30 May 2015	Atlético San Francisco	3–2 (3–4 agg.)	CDU Uruapan	San Francisco del Rincón
17:00	Cruz 20', 51'; Mesillas 32'	Report	Montaño 4'; Magaña 86'	Stadium: Estadio Domingo Velázquez; Attendance: 3,500

==== Final ====
Team 1	Agg.	Team 2	1st leg	2nd leg
Sporting Canamy	2–3	CDU Uruapan	0–2	2–1

===== First leg =====
3 June 2015	CDU Uruapan	2–0	Sporting Canamy	Uruapan
17:00	López 51'; Menera 73'	Report		Stadium: Unidad Deportiva Hermanos López Rayón; Attendance: 3,500

===== Second leg =====
6 June 2015	Sporting Canamy	2–1 (2-3 agg.)	CDU Uruapan	Mexico City
13:00	Figueroa 37'; Zecua 89'	Report	Chávez	Stadium: Deportivo Plutarco Elías Calles; Attendance: 1,000

2014–15 winners

1st title

== Reserve teams play–offs ==
Quarter-finals
1	Cruz Azul Jasso	1	4	5
8	Monterrey	1	0	1
2	Alto Rendimiento Tuzo	0	0	0 (3)
7	Dorados UACH (pen.)	0	0	0 (4)
3	Mineros de Zacatecas	2	8	10
6	Guadalajara	2	0	2
4	Tigres SD	1	1	2
5	Atlas	0	0	0

Semi-finals
1	Cruz Azul Jasso	2	5	7
7	Dorados UACH	0	1	1
3	Mineros de Zacatecas	0	5	5
4	Tigres SD	1	1	2

Final
1	Cruz Azul Jasso	1	0	1
3	Mineros de Zacatecas	4	0	4

== See also ==
- Tercera División de México
