= 2013–14 Tercera División de México season =

Tercera División Profesional
- Season: 2013–14
- Dates: 23 August 2013 – 1 June 2014
- Champions: Pachuca (1st title)
- Promoted: Pachuca; Real Zamora
- Stats are from the regular season only

The 2013–14 Tercera División season is the fourth-tier football league of Mexico. The tournament began on 23 August 2013 and finished on 1 June 2014.

== Competition format ==
The Tercera División (Third Division) is divided into 14 groups. For the 2009/2010 season, the format of the tournament has been reorganized to a home and away format, which all teams will play in their respective group. The 14 groups consist of teams who are eligible to play in the liguilla de ascenso for one promotion spot, teams who are affiliated with teams in the Liga MX, Ascenso MX and Liga Premier, which are not eligible for promotion but will play that who the better filial team in an eight team filial playoff tournament for the entire season.

The league format allows participating franchises to rent their place to another team, so some clubs compete with a different name than the one registered with the FMF.

== Group 1 ==
Group with 10 teams from Campeche, Chiapas, Quintana Roo, Tabasco and Yucatán.

Location of teams in the 2013–14 3ra División Group 1 (Carmen (Campeche), Chiapas and Tabasco)
Location of teams in the 2013–14 3ra División Group 1 (Quintana Roo)
Location of teams in the 2014–15 3ra División Group 1 (Campeche City and Yucatán)

=== Teams ===
Team	City	Home ground	Capacity	Affiliate	Official name
Atlético San Miguel	Chetumal, Quintana Roo	Unidad Deportiva COJUDEQ	1,000	–	–
Chetumal	Chetumal, Quintana Roo	10 de Abril	5,000	—	—
Corsarios de Campeche	Campeche, Campeche	Universitario de Campeche	4,000	—	—
Delfines del Carmen	Ciudad del Carmen, Campeche	Polideportivo UNACAR Campus II	8,000	Delfines	–
Dragones de Tabasco	Villahermosa, Tabasco	Olímpico de Villahermosa	10,500	—	Real Victoria
Ejidatarios de Bonfil	Cancún, Quintana Roo	La Parcela	1,000	—	—
Inter Playa del Carmen	Playa del Carmen, Quintana Roo	Unidad Deportiva Félix González Canto	1,000	Inter Playa del Carmen	—
Itzaes	Homún, Yucatán	Hipólito Tzab	1,000	–	–
Jaguares de la 48	Reforma, Chiapas	Sergio Lira Gallardo	600	—	—
Pioneros Junior	Cancún, Quintana Roo	Cancún 86	6,390	Pioneros de Cancún	—

=== League table ===
Pos	Team	Pld	W	D	L	GF	GA	GD	BP	Pts	Qualification or relegation
1	Corsarios de Campeche	18	12	4	2	28	16	+12	2	42	Promotion play-offs
2	Dragones de Tabasco	18	10	4	4	41	20	+21	1	35	Promotion play-offs
3	Pioneros Junior	18	10	3	5	31	15	+16	1	34	Promotion play-offs
4	Ejidatarios de Bonfil	18	8	6	4	28	25	+3	4	34	Promotion play-offs
5	Jaguares de la 48	18	9	2	7	25	24	+1	1	30	
6	Atlético San Miguel	18	7	4	7	33	27	+6	3	28	
7	Chetumal	18	6	5	7	32	26	+6	3	26	
8	Inter Playa del Carmen	18	4	3	11	10	34	−24	1	16	
9	Delfines del Carmen	18	4	3	11	18	33	−15	0	15	
10	Itzaes	18	1	4	13	15	41	−26	3	10	

Source: Tercera División FMF

== Group 2 ==
Group with 18 teams from Chiapas, Oaxaca and Veracruz.

=== Teams ===
Location of teams in the 2013–14 3ra División Group 3 (Chiapas, Oaxaca and Southern Veracruz)
Location of teams in the 2013–14 3ra División Group 2 (Northern and Central Veraruz)

Team	City	Home ground	Capacity	Affiliate	Official Name
Académicos UGM	Orizaba, Veracruz	Universitario UGM	1,500	–	–
Atlético Boca del Río	Boca del Río, Veracruz	Unidad Deportiva Hugo Sánchez	1,500	—	–
Atlético Veracruz	Veracruz City, Veracruz	CAR Veracruz	1,000	Veracruz	–
Azucareros de Tezonapa	Tezonapa, Veracruz	Ernesto Jácome	1,000	–	–
Cafetaleros de Xalapa	Xalapa, Veracruz	Antonio M. Quirasco	3,000	–	Vaqueros Tepic
Colegio Once México	Cuichapa, Veracruz	Ejidal Rubén Espinoza	1,000	–	–
Cruz Azul Lagunas	Lagunas, Oaxaca	Cruz Azul	2,000	Cruz Azul	–
Delfines UGM	Nogales, Veracruz	UGM Nogales	1,500	—	—
Estudiantes de Xalapa	Xalapa, Veracruz	Antonio M. Quirasco	3,000	–	–
Estudiantes de San Andrés	San Andrés Tuxtla, Veracruz	Unidad Deportiva Lino Fararoni	1,000	—	–
Halcones Marinos de Veracruz	Boca del Río, Veracruz	Unidad Deportiva Hugo Sánchez	1,500	—	–
Lanceros de Cosoleacaque	Cosoleacaque, Veracruz	Unidad Deportiva Miguel Hidalgo	1,000	–	–
Limoneros de Fútbol	Martínez de la Torre, Veracruz	El Cañizo	3,000	–	–
Mezcalapa	Raudales Malpaso, Chiapas	Adolfo López Mateos "La Vaporera"	4,000	–	Atlético Chiapas
Naranjeros de Álamo	Santo Domingo Ingenio, Oaxaca	Municipal SOP	1,000	–	–
Petroleros de Poza Rica	Poza Rica, Veracruz	Heriberto Jara Corona	10,000	—	—
Piñeros de Loma Bonita	Loma Bonita, Oaxaca	20 de Noviembre	1,000	–	–
Santos Córdoba	Córdoba, Veracruz	Rafael Murillo Vidal	3,800	Santos Laguna	–

=== League table ===
Pos	Team	Pld	W	D	L	GF	GA	GD	BP	Pts	Qualification or relegation
1	Cruz Azul Lagunas	34	21	7	6	82	25	+57	6	76	Promotion play-offs
2	Piñeros de Loma Bonita	34	21	8	5	79	38	+41	2	73	Promotion play-offs
3	Mezcalapa	34	16	12	6	63	38	+25	6	66	Promotion play-offs
4	Petroleros de Poza Rica	34	20	3	11	60	34	+26	1	64	Promotion play-offs
5	Estudiantes de San Andrés	34	17	7	10	76	46	+30	4	62	Promotion play-offs
6	Académicos UGM	34	17	8	9	52	36	+16	2	61	
7	Santos Córdoba	34	15	5	14	45	44	+1	2	52	
8	Colegio Once México	34	11	8	15	43	48	−5	8	49	
9	Lanceros de Cosoleacaque	34	13	6	15	39	45	−6	4	49	
10	Azucareros de Tezonapa	34	13	6	15	42	57	−15	2	47	
11	Halcones Marinos de Veracruz	34	11	8	15	50	50	0	5	46	
12	Atlético Veracruz	34	11	9	14	41	43	−2	3	45	
13	Atlético Boca del Río	34	11	6	17	36	52	−16	5	44	
14	Limoneros de Fútbol	34	13	3	18	52	74	−22	2	44	
15	Naranjeros de Álamo	34	11	8	15	34	59	−25	3	44	
16	Delfines UGM	34	8	9	17	45	70	−25	4	37	
17	Cafetaleros de Xalapa	34	8	7	19	53	73	−20	4	35	
18	Estudiantes de Xalapa	34	5	10	19	36	78	−42	2	27	

Source: Tercera División FMF

== Group 3 ==
Group with 17 teams from Guerrero, Morelos, Oaxaca, Puebla, State of Mexico and Veracruz.

=== Teams ===
Location of teams in the 2013–14 3ra División Group 6 (Morelos)
Location of teams in the 2013–14 3ra División Group 6 (Guerrero)
Location of teams in the 2013–14 3ra División Group 6 (Puebla and Veracruz)
Location of teams in the 2013–14 3ra División Group 3 (Oaxaca and State of Mexico)

Team	City	Home ground	Capacity	Affiliate	Official name
Acapulco	Acapulco, Guerrero	Hugo Sánchez	6,000	–	–
Albinegros de Orizaba	Orizaba, Veracruz	EMSA	1,500	–	–
Alpha	Puebla City, Puebla	Club Alpha 3	3,000	–	–
Anlesjeroka	Tehuacán, Puebla	Anlesjeroka	400	Guadalajara	–
Atlético Cuernavaca	Cuernavaca, Morelos	Unidad Deportiva Miraval	1,000	–	–
Ballenas Galeana Morelos	Xochitepec, Morelos	La Escuelita	1,000	–	–
Chilpancingo	Chilpancingo, Guerrero	Polideportivo Chilpancingo	1,000	–	–
Cuautla UNILA	Cuautla, Morelos	Isidro Gil Tapia	5,000	Cuautla	–
Guerreros de Yecapixtla	Yecapixtla, Morelos	Fidel Díaz Vera	1,000	–	–
Héroes de Veracruz	Xiutetelco, Puebla	Municipal Xiutetelco	1,000	–	–
Real Acapulco	Acapulco, Guerrero	Unidad Deportiva Acapulco	13,000	–	Texcoco
Selva Cañera	Zacatepec, Morelos	Agustín Coruco Díaz	16,000	–	–
SEP Puebla	Puebla City, Puebla	Unidad Deportiva Mario Vázquez Raña	800	–	–
Teca Huixquilucan	San Mateo Atenco, State of Mexico	Municipal San Mateo Atenco	2,000	Tecamachalco	–
Tigrillos Dorados MRCI	San Jerónimo Tlacochahuaya, Oaxaca	Campo Independiente MRCI	3,000	–	–
Tulyehualco	Zacatlán, Puebla	Campo El Moral	500	–	–
Zapata	Xochitepec, Morelos	Unidad Deportiva Chiconcuac	1,000	–	–

=== League table ===
Pos	Team	Pld	W	D	L	GF	GA	GD	BP	Pts	Qualification or relegation
1	Ballenas Galeana Morelos	32	21	5	6	84	30	+54	5	73	Promotion play-offs
2	Guerreros de Yecapixtla	32	21	8	3	82	27	+55	1	72	Promotion play-offs
3	Tigrillos Dorados MRCI	32	20	4	8	77	38	+39	1	65	Promotion play-offs
4	Acapulco	32	18	6	8	73	37	+36	4	64	Promotion play-offs
5	SEP Puebla	32	18	6	8	80	35	+45	2	62	Promotion play-offs
6	Selva Cañera	32	16	10	6	64	37	+27	4	62	
7	Chilpancingo	32	18	4	10	73	57	+16	2	60	
8	Atlético Cuernavaca	32	11	12	9	50	41	+9	9	54	
9	Cuautla UNILA	32	15	7	10	71	45	+26	1	53	
10	Zapata	32	15	2	15	61	60	+1	2	49	
11	Alpha	32	11	8	13	47	49	−2	7	48	
12	Albinegros de Orizaba	32	12	6	14	42	44	−2	4	46	
13	Anlesjeroka	32	10	6	16	52	51	+1	4	40	
14	Real Acapulco	32	5	6	21	36	71	−35	2	23	
15	Héroes de Veracruz	32	5	6	21	38	84	−46	1	22	
16	Tulyehualco	32	4	3	25	16	120	−104	1	16	
17	Teca Huixquilucan	32	2	1	29	9	129	−120	0	7	

Source: Tercera División FMF

== Group 4 ==
Group with 16 teams from Greater Mexico City.

=== Teams ===
Location of teams in the 2013–14 3ra División Group 4 (Greater Mexico City urban area)
Location of teams in the 2013–14 3ra División Group 4 (Greater Mexico City rural area)

Team	City	Home ground	Capacity	Affiliate	Official name
Águilas de Teotihuacán	Teotihuacán, State of Mexico	Municipal Acolman	1,000	–	–
Álamos	Venustiano Carranza, Mexico City	Magdalena Mixhuca Sports City	500	–	–
Ángeles de la Ciudad	Iztacalco, Mexico City	Jesús Martínez "Palillo"	6,000	–	–
Atlético Pascual	Venustiano Carranza, Mexico City	Magdalena Mixhuca Sports City	500	–	–
Azules de la Sección 26	Gustavo A. Madero, Mexico City	Deportivo Francisco Zarco	500	Pachuca	–
Coyotes Neza	Ciudad Nezahualcóyotl, State of Mexico	Deportivo Soraya Jiménez	1,000	–	–
Deportivo Iztacalco	Atlautla, State of Mexico	La Granja	1,500	–	–
Lobos Unión Neza	Ciudad Nezahualcóyotl, State of Mexico	Deportivo Francisco I. Madero	2,000	–	–
Marina	Xochimilco, Mexico City	Valentín González	5,000	–	–
Morelos Ecatepec	Ecatepec, State of Mexico	Adolfo López Mateos	500	–	–
Novillos Neza	San Mateo Huitzilzingo, State of Mexico	San Mateo Huitzilzingo	1,000	–	–
Pato Baeza	Ixtapaluca, State of Mexico	La Antorcha	1,000	–	–
Real Olmeca Sport	Iztacalco, Mexico City	Magdalena Mixhuca Sports City	500	–	–
Santa Rosa	Xochimilco, Mexico City	San Isidro	1,000	–	–
Sporting Canamy	Iztapalapa, Mexico City	Deportivo Francisco I. Madero	2,000	–	–
Tecamachalco Sur	Huixquilucan de Degollado, State of Mexico	Alberto Pérez Navarro	3,000	–	Ajax Jiutepec

=== League table ===
Pos	Team	Pld	W	D	L	GF	GA	GD	BP	Pts	Qualification or relegation
1	Sporting Canamy	30	24	4	2	110	26	+84	3	79	Promotion play-offs
2	Marina	30	22	3	5	63	26	+37	2	71	Promotion play-offs
3	Ángeles de la Ciudad	30	20	7	3	90	27	+63	3	70	Promotion play-offs
4	Coyotes Neza	30	16	9	5	49	29	+20	6	63	Promotion play-offs
5	Azules de la Sección 26	30	15	10	5	57	33	+24	6	61	Promotion play-offs
6	Álamos	30	15	9	6	51	22	+29	6	60	
7	Tecamachalco Sur	30	12	9	9	50	43	+7	5	50	
8	Lobos Unión Neza	30	10	10	10	37	38	−1	5	45	
9	Santa Rosa	30	9	8	13	44	44	0	3	38	
10	Morelos Ecatepec	30	9	8	13	45	56	−11	2	37	
11	Real Olmeca Sport	30	6	12	12	41	54	−13	6	36	
12	Águilas de Teotihuacán	30	8	7	15	36	52	−16	5	36	
13	Novillos Neza	30	6	7	17	28	65	−37	6	31	
14	Pato Baeza	30	5	8	17	22	48	−26	3	26	
15	Atlético Pascual	30	3	5	22	27	87	−60	0	14	
16	Iztacalco	30	2	0	28	17	117	−100	0	6	

Source: Tercera División FMF

== Group 5 ==
Group with 16 teams from State of Mexico.

Location of teams in the 2013–14 3ra División Group 5

=== Teams ===
Team	City	Home ground	Capacity	Affiliate	Official name
Atlético Naucalpan	Naucalpan, State of Mexico	Unidad Cuauhtémoc	1,500	–	–
Atlético UEFA	Coacalco, State of Mexico	Campos Fragoso	500	–	–
Aztecas AMF Soccer	Chapa de Mota, State of Mexico	Unidad Deportiva Municipal	1,000	–	–
Deportivo Vallesano	Valle de Bravo, State of Mexico	La Capilla	1,000	–	–
Estudiantes de Atlacomulco	Atlacomulco, State of Mexico	Ignacio Pichardo Pagaza	2,000	–	–
Futcenter	Tlalnepantla de Baz, State of Mexico	Deportivo Santa Cecilia	1,000	–	–
Guerreros Pericúes	Unknown	Unknown	–	–	–
Grupo Sherwood	Metepec, State of Mexico	Cancha Arqueros F.C.	500	–	–
Ixtlahuaca	Ixtlahuaca, State of Mexico	Municipal	2,000	–	–
Jilotepec	Jilotepec, State of Mexico	Rubén Chávez Chávez	2,000	–	–
Manchester Metepec	Metepec, State of Mexico	Unidad Cultural SNTE	500	–	–
Metepec	Metepec, State of Mexico	Cancha Arqueros FC	1,000	–	–
Potros UAEM	Toluca, State of Mexico	Alberto "Chivo" Córdoba	32,603	Potros UAEM	–
Real Halcones	Atizapán de Zaragoza, State of Mexico	Deportivo Ana Gabriela Guevara	2,500	–	–
Tejupilco	Tejupilco, State of Mexico	Unidad Deportiva Tejupilco	1,000	–	–
Tolcayuca	Cuautitlán, State of Mexico	Los Pinos	5,000	–	–

=== League table ===
Pos	Team	Pld	W	D	L	GF	GA	GD	BP	Pts	Qualification or relegation
1	Manchester Metepec	30	24	3	3	110	19	+91	3	78	Promotion play-offs
2	Potros UAEM	30	24	4	2	86	11	+75	0	76	Promotion play-offs
3	Estudiantes de Atlacomulco	30	20	6	4	68	30	+38	2	68	Promotion play-offs
4	Atlético UEFA	30	19	4	7	63	29	+34	3	64	Promotion play-offs
5	Metepec	30	17	5	8	64	32	+32	2	58	Promotion play-offs
6	Tejupilco	30	14	7	9	58	39	+19	6	55	
7	Jilotepec	30	12	10	8	50	33	+17	8	54	
8	Deportivo Vallesano	30	14	4	12	60	49	+11	2	48	
9	Real Halcones	30	12	4	14	40	58	−18	2	42	
10	Atlético Naucalpan	30	10	6	14	32	44	−12	1	37	
11	Tolcayuca	30	9	6	15	34	62	−28	3	36	
12	Ixtlahuaca	30	9	2	19	56	87	−31	1	30	
13	Futcenter	30	8	1	21	27	54	−27	1	26	
14	Grupo Sherwood	30	5	6	19	34	79	−45	1	22	
15	Aztecas AMF Soccer	30	6	2	22	28	93	−65	0	20	
16	Guerreros Pericúes	30	1	0	29	13	110	−97	0	3	

Source: Tercera División FMF

== Group 6 ==
Group with 14 teams from Hidalgo, Puebla, San Luis Potosí and State of Mexico.

=== Teams ===
Location of teams in the 2013–14 3ra División Group 7 (Acolman, Hidalgo and SLP)
Location of teams in the 2013–14 3ra División Group 7 (Amecameca, Puebla and Tlaxcala)

Team	City	Home ground	Capacity	Affiliate	Official name
Atlético Hidalgo	Pachuca, Hidalgo	La Higa	1,000	–	–
Cruz Azul Dublán	Ciudad Cooperativa Cruz Azul, Hidalgo	Estadio 10 de Diciembre	17,000	Cruz Azul	–
Deportivo Ixmiquilpan	Ixmiquilpan, Hidalgo	Unidad Deportiva Ixmiquilpan	1,000	–	Plateados de Cerro Azul
Leones de Huauchinango	Huauchinango, Puebla	Unidad Deportiva México	1,000	–	–
Linces de Tlaxcala	Tlaxcala City, Tlaxcala	Maracaná Tlaxco	500	–	–
Lobos BUAP	Puebla City, Puebla	Ciudad Universitaria Puebla	1,000	Lobos BUAP	–
Los Ángeles	Puebla, Puebla	Ex Hacienda San José Maravillas	500	—	—
Pachuca	San Agustín Tlaxiaca, Hidalgo	Universidad del Fútbol	1,000	Pachuca	–
Reales de Puebla	Puebla, Puebla	Preparatoria Benito Juárez	1,000	—	—
Real San Cosme	Amecameca, State of Mexico	Francisco Flores	3,000	–	–
Santiago Tulantepec	Santiago Tulantepec, Hidalgo	Unidad Deportiva Conrado Muntane	1,000	–	–
Star Club	Tlaxcala City, Tlaxcala	San José del Agua	500	—	—
Sultanes de Tamazunchale	Tamazunchale, San Luis Potosí	Deportivo Solidaridad	1,650	—	—
Unión Acolman	Acolman, State of Mexico	San Carlos Tepexpan	1,200	–	–

=== League table ===
Pos	Team	Pld	W	D	L	GF	GA	GD	BP	Pts	Qualification or relegation
1	Pachuca	26	21	4	1	91	16	+75	2	69	Promotion play-offs
2	Cruz Azul Dublán	26	19	4	3	88	20	+68	1	62	Reserve teams play-offs
3	Los Ángeles	26	17	4	5	81	25	+56	4	59	Promotion play-offs
4	Lobos BUAP	26	16	5	5	65	28	+37	3	56	Promotion play-offs
5	Sultanes de Tamazunchale	26	12	10	4	53	24	+29	6	52	Promotion play-offs
6	Star Club	26	13	1	12	61	35	+26	1	41	
7	Linces de Tlaxcala	26	12	4	10	46	34	+12	1	41	
8	Atlético Hidalgo	26	11	3	12	54	47	+7	0	36	
9	Reales de Puebla	26	10	2	14	36	52	−16	0	32	
10	Santiago Tulantepec	26	7	5	14	30	38	−8	3	29	
11	Ixmiquilpan	26	9	1	16	32	66	−34	0	28	
12	Leones de Huauchinango	26	5	5	16	29	57	−28	3	23	
13	Real San Cosme	26	3	0	23	18	88	−70	0	9	
14	Unión Acolman	26	2	0	24	16	176	−160	0	6	

Source: Tercera División FMF

== Group 7 ==
Group with 18 teams from Greater Mexico City and Hidalgo.

=== Teams ===
Location of teams in the 2013–14 3ra División Group 7 (Northern Greater Mexico City and Hidalgo)
Location of teams in the 2013–14 3ra División Group 7 (Greater Mexico City)

Team	City	Home ground	Capacity	Affiliate	Official name
Atlético de Madrid	Tlalpan, Mexico City	Centro Social y Deportivo Rosario Iglesias	6,000	Atlético Madrid	–
Atlético San Juan de Aragón	Papalotla, State of Mexico	Deportivo Municipal Papalotla	500	–	–
Buendía	Iztacalco, Mexico City	Magdalena Mixhuca Sports City	500	–	–
CEFOR Cuauhtémoc Blanco	Venustiano Carranza, Mexico City	Deportivo Plutarco Elías Calles	1,000	–	–
Escuela de Alto Rendimiento	Huixquilucan de Degollado, State of Mexico	Universidad Anáhuac México Norte	300	–	–
Frailes Homape	Xochimilco, Mexico City	San Isidro	1,000	–	–
Halcones del Valle del Mezquital	Teoloyucan, State of Mexico	Unidad Deportiva Teoloyucan	1,000	–	–
Hidalguense	Pachuca, Hidalgo	Club Hidalguense	600	–	–
Independiente Mexiquense	Nicolás Romero, State of Mexico	Progreso Industrial	1,500	–	–
Jardon Fut Soccer	Iztapalapa, Mexico City	Deportivo Leandro Valle	1,500	–	–
Leones de Lomar	Xochimilco, Mexico City	San Isidro	1,200	–	–
Panteras de Lindavista	Gustavo A. Madero, Mexico City	Deportivo Plutarco Elías Calles	1,000	–	–
Proyecto Nuevo Chimalhuacán	Chimalhuacán, State of Mexico	Tepalcates	5,000	Nuevo Chimalhuacán	–
Promodep Central	Xochimilco, Mexico City	Deportivo Xochimilco	1,000	–	–
Reyes de Texcoco	Texcoco, State of Mexico	Tempelulli Campo 4	500	–	–
San José del Arenal	Chalco, State of Mexico	José Carbajal García	500	–	–
Universidad del Fútbol	San Agustín Tlaxiaca, Hidalgo	Universidad del Fútbol	1,000	Pachuca	–
Vikingos de Chalco	San Juan Zitlaltepec, State of Mexico	Los Brujos	3,000	–	–

=== League table ===
Pos	Team	Pld	W	D	L	GF	GA	GD	BP	Pts	Qualification or relegation
1	Atlético de Madrid	34	26	4	4	128	8	+120	2	84	Promotion play-offs
2	Promodep Central	34	23	6	5	101	30	+71	4	79	Promotion play-offs
3	Escuela de Alto Rendimiento	34	20	11	3	72	32	+40	7	78	Promotion play-offs
4	Proyecto Nuevo Chimalhuacán	34	19	8	7	88	52	+36	3	68	Promotion play-offs
5	Universidad del Fútbol	34	19	6	9	85	45	+40	3	66	Promotion play-offs
6	Buendía	34	19	5	10	75	48	+27	4	66	
7	Independiente Mexiquense	34	17	6	11	68	54	+14	6	63	
8	CEFOR Cuauhtémoc Blanco	34	17	9	8	83	33	+50	2	62	
9	Panteras de Lindavista	34	17	2	15	70	62	+8	1	54	
10	Reyes de Texcoco	34	14	6	14	79	83	−4	1	49	
11	Hidalguense	34	13	7	14	56	60	−4	2	48	
12	San José del Arenal	34	8	12	14	65	76	−11	6	42	
13	Leones de Lomar	34	12	2	20	49	88	−39	1	39	
14	Atlético San Juan de Aragón	34	10	6	18	44	56	−12	2	38	
15	Halcones del Valle del Mezquital	34	6	6	22	44	118	−74	4	28	
16	Vikingos de Chalco	34	7	2	25	29	71	−42	1	24	
17	Frailes Homape	34	3	7	24	26	84	−58	3	19	
18	Jardon Fut Soccer	34	3	1	30	14	148	−134	1	11	

Source: Tercera División FMF

== Group 8 ==
Group with 13 teams from Guanajuato, Querétaro and Michoacán.

=== Teams ===
Location of teams in the 2013–14 3ra División Group 8 (Guanajuato and Querétaro)
Location of teams in the 2013–14 3ra División Group 8 (Michoacán)

Team	City	Home ground	Capacity	Affiliate	Official name
Cobras	Irapuato, Guanajuato	Sergio León Chávez	25,000	–	–
Corregidores	Corregidora, Querétaro	Unidad Deportiva La Negreta	1,000	–	Chapulineros de Oaxaca
Delfines de Abasolo	Abasolo, Guanajuato	Municipal de Abasolo	2,500	–	–
Deportivo Corregidora	Corregidora, Querétaro	Municipal de Querétaro	12,000	–	–
Guerreros de Pedro Escobedo	Pedro Escobedo, Querétaro	Unidad Deportiva Centro	1,000	–	Atlético Iztacalco
Monarcas Zacapu	Zacapu, Michoacán	Municipal de Zacapu	2,500	Monarcas Morelia	–
Jaral del Progreso	Jaral del Progreso, Guanajuato	Unidad Deportiva Municipal	1,000	–	–
Limoneros de Apatzingán	Apatzingán, Michoacán	Unidad Deportiva Adolfo López Mateos	5,000	Monarcas Morelia	–
Originales Aguacateros	Uruapan, Michoacán	Unidad Deportiva Hermanos López Rayón	5,000	–	–
Querétaro	Querétaro, Querétaro	Parque Bicentenario	1,000	Querétaro	–
Toros de Tequisquiapan	Tequisquiapan, Querétaro	Unidad Deportiva Emiliano Zapata	1,000	–	San Juan del Río
Tota Carbajal	León, Guanajuato	Club Cabezas Rojas	1,000	–	Cabezas Rojas
CDU Uruapan	Uruapan, Michoacán	Club Universidad	500	–	Peces Blancos de Pátzcuaro

=== League table ===
Pos	Team	Pld	W	D	L	GF	GA	GD	BP	Pts	Qualification or relegation
1	Limoneros de Apatzingán	24	23	0	1	99	13	+86	0	69	Promotion play-offs
2	CDU Uruapan	24	15	6	3	80	32	+48	2	53	Promotion play-offs
3	Originales Aguacateros de Uruapan	24	15	4	5	61	30	+31	4	53	Promotion play-offs
4	Querétaro	24	17	1	6	54	26	+28	1	53	Promotion play-offs
5	Delfines de Abasolo	24	15	3	6	57	24	+33	2	50	
6	Corregidores	24	14	4	6	60	35	+25	1	47	
7	Monarcas Zacapu	24	7	7	10	31	38	−7	3	31	
8	Jaral del Progreso	24	10	1	13	42	54	−12	0	31	
9	Deportivo Corregidora	24	6	4	14	30	50	−20	1	23	
10	Cobras	24	4	4	16	28	71	−43	2	18	
11	Toros de Tequisquiapan	24	4	3	17	21	83	−62	3	18	
12	Guerreros de Pedro Escobedo	24	3	3	18	25	78	−53	1	13	
13	Tota Carbajal	24	3	0	21	16	71	−55	0	9	

Source: Tercera División FMF

== Group 9 ==
Group with 18 teams from Guanajuato, Michoacán, San Luis Potosí and Zacatecas.

=== Teams ===
Location of teams in the 2013–14 3ra División Group 9 (Guanajuato)
Location of teams in the 2013–14 3ra División Group 9 (Zacatecas)
Location of teams in the 2013–14 3ra División Group 9 (Jalisco and Michoacán)
Location of teams in the 2013–14 3ra División Group 9 (San Luis Potosí)

Team	City	Home ground	Capacity	Affiliate	Official name
Águilas Reales de Zacatecas	Zacatecas City, Zacatecas	Francisco Villa	13,000	–	–
Atlético ECCA	León, Guanajuato	Unidad Deportiva Enrique Fernández Martínez	1,500	–	–
Atlético Huejutla	Morelos, Zacatecas	Unidad Deportiva Minera Madero	1,000	–	–
Atlético San Francisco	San Francisco del Rincón, Guanajuato	Domingo Velázquez	3,500	–	–
Cabezas Rojas	León, Guanajuato	Club Cabezas Rojas	1,000	–	–
Celaya	Celaya, Guanajuato	Miguel Alemán Valdés	23,182	Celaya	–
Colegio Guanajuato	León, Guanajuato	Colegio Guanajuato	1,000	–	–
La Piedad Apaseo	Apaseo el Alto, Guanajuato	Unidad Deportiva Manuel Ávila Camacho	1,000	La Piedad	–
Libertadores de Pénjamo	Lagos de Moreno, Jalisco	Salvador "Chava" Reyes	2,500	–	–
Lobos de San Luis	San Luis Potosí City, San Luis Potosí	Centro de Entrenamiento La Presa	1,000	–	–
Mineros de Fresnillo	Fresnillo, Zacatecas	Minera Fresnillo	6,000	Mineros de Fresnillo	–
Real Leonés	León, Guanajuato	Club Cabezas Rojas	1,000	–	–
Real Zamora	Zamora, Michoacán	Unidad Deportiva El Chamizal	5,000	–	–
Salamanca	Salamanca, Guanajuato	El Molinito	2,500	–	–
Tamasopo	Tamasopo, San Luis Potosí	Unidad Deportiva El Chacuaco	1,000	–	Gallos Hidrocálidos
Tlajomulco	Tlajomulco de Zúñiga, Jalisco	Unidad Deportiva Mariano Otero	3,000	–	–
Tuzos UAZ	Zacatecas, Zacatecas	Universitario Unidad Deportiva Norte	5,000	Tuzos UAZ	–
Unión León	León, Guanajuato	Lalo Gutiérrez	1,000	–	–

=== League table ===
Pos	Team	Pld	W	D	L	GF	GA	GD	BP	Pts	Qualification or relegation
1	Atlético San Francisco	34	26	5	3	103	20	+83	3	86	Promotion play-offs
2	Salamanca	34	26	3	5	91	20	+71	1	82	Promotion play-offs
3	Real Zamora	34	24	7	3	77	20	+57	2	81	Promotion play-offs
4	Águilas Reales de Zacatecas	34	20	8	6	77	29	+48	4	72	Promotion play-offs
5	Tuzos UAZ	34	19	8	7	69	33	+36	6	71	Promotion play-offs
6	Lobos de San Luis	34	20	6	8	73	39	+34	4	70	
7	Tamasopo	34	17	6	11	51	48	+3	4	61	
8	Colegio Guanajuato	34	16	5	13	77	48	+29	2	55	
9	Celaya	34	14	8	12	52	40	+12	2	52	
10	Tlajomulco	34	13	5	16	49	52	−3	4	48	
11	Atlético ECCA	34	12	7	15	48	44	+4	3	46	
12	Cabezas Rojas	34	11	5	18	48	64	−16	4	42	
13	Mineros de Fresnillo	34	10	7	17	39	58	−19	3	40	
14	Libertadores de Pénjamo	34	8	10	16	40	71	−31	5	39	
15	La Piedad Apaseo	34	6	5	23	35	95	−60	1	24	
16	Unión León	34	5	5	24	17	72	−55	2	22	
17	Atlético Huejutla	34	4	3	27	26	123	−97	0	15	
18	Real Leonés	34	3	1	30	17	113	−96	1	11	

Source: Tercera División FMF

== Group 10 ==
Group with 18 teams from Colima, Jalisco and Michoacán.

=== Teams ===
Location of teams in the 2013–14 3ra División Group 10

Team	City	Home ground	Capacity	Affiliate	Official name
Arandas	Arandas, Jalisco	Unidad Deportiva Gustavo Díaz Ordaz	1,500	–	–
Atlético Cocula	Tlaquepaque, Jalisco	Deportivo Adalu	1,000	–	–
Atlético Tecomán	Tecomán, Colima	Víctor Eduardo Sevilla Torres	2,000	–	–
Atotonilco	Atotonilco El Alto, Jalisco	Unidad Deportiva Margarito Ramírez	1,500	–	–
Autlán	Autlán, Jalisco	Unidad Deportiva Chapultepec	1,500	–	Deportivo Tomates
Charales de Chapala	Chapala, Jalisco	Municipal Juan Rayo	1,000	–	–
Comala Pueblo Mágico	Comala, Colima	Colima	12,000	–	Aztecas Arandas
Escuela de Fútbol Chivas	Zapopan, Jalisco	Chivas San Rafael	500	Guadalajara	–
Lobos de Zihuatanejo	Zapopan, Jalisco	Atlético del Valle	1,000	–	–
Nuevos Valores de Ocotlán	Ocotlán, Jalisco	Municipal Benito Juárez	1,500	Leones Negros UdeG	–
Oro	Zapopan, Jalisco	Campo Oro	1,000	–	–
Queseros de San José	San José de Gracia, Michoacán	Juanito Chávez	1,500	–	–
Tepatitlán	Tepatitlán, Jalisco	Gregorio "Tepa" Gómez	10,000	Tepatitlán	–
Tequila Pueblo Mágico	Tequila, Jalisco	Unidad Deportiva 24 de Enero	1,000	–	–
Valle del Grullo	Tlaquepaque, Jalisco	Unidad Deportiva Revolución Mexicana	5,000	–	–
Vaqueros	Tlaquepaque, Jalisco	Club Vaqueros Ixtlán	1,000	–	–
Vaqueros Bellavista	Acatlán de Juárez, Jalisco	Juan Bigotón Jasso	1,500	–	–
Volcanes de Colima	Colima City, Colima	Unidad Deportiva Morelos	2,000	–	–

=== League table ===
Pos	Team	Pld	W	D	L	GF	GA	GD	BP	Pts	Qualification or relegation
1	Vaqueros Bellavista	34	29	3	2	88	22	+66	1	91	Promotion play-offs
2	Vaqueros	34	27	2	5	93	27	+66	1	84	Promotion play-offs
3	Tepatitlán	34	24	4	6	71	28	+43	1	77	Promotion play-offs
4	Escuela de Fútbol Chivas	34	19	7	8	66	32	+34	5	69	Reserve teams play-offs
5	Atotonilco	34	17	9	8	89	55	+34	8	68	Promotion play-offs
6	Atlético Tecomán	34	20	5	9	99	61	+38	1	66	Promotion play-offs
7	Nuevos Valores de Ocotlán	34	18	7	9	73	51	+22	4	65	
8	Queseros de San José	34	17	8	9	60	33	+27	3	62	
9	Tequila Pueblo Mágico	34	18	4	12	59	39	+20	2	60	
10	Arandas	34	15	8	11	61	49	+12	4	57	
11	Atlético Cocula	34	12	9	13	54	65	−11	3	48	
12	Comala Pueblo Mágico	34	13	3	18	64	65	−1	0	42	
13	Autlán	34	7	7	20	39	83	−44	6	34	
14	Volcanes de Colima	34	7	5	22	24	88	−64	2	28	
15	Charales de Chapala	34	6	7	21	30	61	−31	2	27	
16	Lobos de Zihuatanejo	34	5	4	25	40	91	−51	3	22	
17	Oro	34	3	1	30	27	116	−89	0	10	
18	Valle del Grullo	34	1	3	30	15	116	−101	1	7	

Source: Tercera División FMF

== Group 11 ==
Group with 18 teams from Jalisco, Michoacán and Nayarit.

=== Teams ===
Location of teams in the 2013–14 3ra División Group 11 (Jalisco, Michoacán and Nayarit)

Team	City	Home ground	Capacity	Affiliate	Official name
Atlas	Zapopan, Jalisco	CECAF	1,000	Atlas	–
Aves Blancas	Tepatitlán, Jalisco	Corredor Industrial	1,200	–	–
Cazcanes de Ameca	Ameca, Jalisco	Núcleo Deportivo y de Espectáculos Ameca	4,000	–	–
Colegio Albert Schweitzer	Zapopan, Jalisco	Instalaciones Telmex	1,000	–	–
Cocula	Zapopan, Jalisco	Morumbí Cancha 1	800	–	–
Deportivo Las Varas	Las Varas, Nayarit	Unidad Deportiva Ejidal	1,500	–	–
Deportivo Los Altos	Yahualica, Jalisco	Las Ánimas	8,500	Deportivo Los Altos	–
Deportivo Tepic	Tepic, Nayarit	Arena Cora	12,271	Coras	–
Estudiantes Tecos	Zapopan, Jalisco	Tres de Marzo	18,779	Estudiantes Tecos	–
Guadalajara	Zapopan, Jalisco	Verde Valle	800	Guadalajara	–
Hipocampos Vallarta	Puerto Vallarta, Jalisco	La Preciosa	2,000	–	–
Jaguares de Santiago	Santiago Ixcuintla, Nayarit	Municipal	1,000	–	–
Leones Negros UdeG	Zapopan, Jalisco	Club Deportivo La Primavera	3,000	Leones Negros UdeG	–
Leones Negros UdeG Talpa	Talpa de Allende, Jalisco	Unidad Deportiva Halcón Peña	1,000	Leones Negros UdeG	–
Nacional	Guadalajara, Jalisco	Club Deportivo Occidente	1,000	–	–
Potros de Bahía de Banderas	Bahía de Banderas, Nayarit	Unidad Deportiva San José del Valle	4,000	–	–
Revolucionarios	Zapopan, Jalisco	Colegio Once México	3,000	–	–
Sahuayo	Sahuayo, Michoacán	Unidad Deportiva Municipal	1,500	Sahuayo	–

=== League table ===
Pos	Team	Pld	W	D	L	GF	GA	GD	BP	Pts	Qualification or relegation
1	Estudiantes Tecos	34	25	4	5	82	24	+58	3	82	Reserve teams play-offs
2	Deportivo Las Varas	34	19	6	9	56	31	+25	4	67	Promotion play-offs
3	Deportivo Tepic	34	19	7	8	61	40	+21	2	66	Promotion play-offs
4	Atlas	34	18	6	10	72	35	+37	4	64	Reserve teams play-offs
5	Guadalajara	34	18	7	9	77	42	+35	3	64	
6	Cocula	34	19	5	10	59	43	+16	2	64	Promotion play-offs
7	Deportivo Los Altos	34	18	6	10	77	55	+22	3	63	Promotion play-offs
8	Jaguares de Santiago	34	18	7	9	68	59	+9	2	63	Promotion play-offs
9	Potros de Bahía de Banderas	34	16	7	11	55	44	+11	6	61	
10	Cazcanes de Ameca	34	16	9	9	65	38	+27	2	59	
11	Leones Negros UdeG	34	13	9	12	53	42	+11	9	57	
12	Aves Blancas	34	11	11	12	53	45	+8	5	49	
13	Revolucionarios	34	10	4	20	41	69	−28	2	36	
14	Hipocampos Vallarta	34	8	6	20	43	65	−22	2	32	
15	Colegio Albert Schweitzer	34	9	3	22	36	85	−49	2	32	
16	Sahuayo	34	9	2	23	48	91	−43	0	29	
17	Nacional	34	5	3	26	27	84	−57	0	18	
18	Leones Negros UdeG Talpa	34	3	2	29	16	97	−81	1	12	

Source: Tercera División FMF

== Group 12 ==
Group with 15 teams from Coahuila, Nuevo León, San Luis Potosí and Tamaulipas.

=== Teams ===
Location of teams in the 2013–14 3ra División Group 12 (Tamasopo, S.L.P., Tamaulipas and Veracruz)
Location of teams in the 2013–14 3ra División Group 12 (Coahuila, Matehuala, S.L.P and Nuevo León)

Team	City	Home ground	Capacity	Affiliate	Official name
Atlético Altamira	Altamira, Tamaulipas	Lázaro Cárdenas	2,500	–	–
Bravos de Nuevo Laredo	Nuevo Laredo, Tamaulipas	Unidad Deportiva Benito Juárez	5,000	Bravos de Nuevo Laredo	–
Canteranos Altamira	Altamira, Tamaulipas	Cancha 2 Club Altamira	500	Altamira	–
Ciudad Madero	Ciudad Madero, Tamaulipas	Olímpico del Tecnológico de Madero	7,000	–	–
Correcaminos UAT	Ciudad Victoria, Tamaulipas	Universitario Eugenio Alvizo Porras	5,000	Correcaminos UAT	–
Coyotes de Saltillo	Saltillo, Coahuila	Olímpico Francisco I. Madero	7,000	–	–
Estudiantes Tecnológico de Nuevo Laredo	Nuevo Laredo, Tamaulipas	Olímpico del Tecnológico de Nuevo Laredo	1,200	–	–
Ho Gar Matamoros	Matamoros, Tamaulipas	Pedro Salazar Maldonado	3,000	–	–
Jaguares de Nuevo León	San Nicolás de los Garza, Nuevo León	Unidad Deportiva Oriente	1,000	–	–
Monterrey	Monterrey, Nuevo León	El Cerrito	1,000	Monterrey	–
Oxitipa Ciudad Valles	Ciudad Valles, San Luis Potosí	Unidad Deportiva de Veteranos	1,000	–	–
Panteras Negras GNL	Guadalupe, Nuevo León	Unidad Deportiva La Talaverna	5,000	–	–
Tigres SD	General Zuazua, Nuevo León	La Cueva de Zuazua	800	Tigres UANL	–
Troyanos UDEM	San Pedro Garza García, Nuevo León	Universidad de Monterrey	1,000	–	–
Tuneros de Matehuala	Matehuala, San Luis Potosí	Manuel Moreno Torres	2,000	–	–

=== League table ===
Pos	Team	Pld	W	D	L	GF	GA	GD	BP	Pts	Qualification or relegation
1	Tigres SD	28	19	4	5	42	19	+23	1	62	Reserve teams play-offs
2	Monterrey	28	13	11	4	56	24	+32	9	59	Reserve teams play-offs
3	Troyanos UDEM	28	13	9	6	48	31	+17	4	52	Promotion play-offs
4	Ho Gar Matamoros	28	15	4	9	41	28	+13	3	52	Promotion play-offs
5	Canteranos Altamira	28	14	7	7	53	31	+22	2	51	
6	Ciudad Madero	28	14	7	7	46	29	+17	2	51	Promotion play-offs
7	Coyotes de Saltillo	28	13	3	12	37	35	+2	1	43	Promotion play-offs
8	Jaguares de Nuevo León	28	11	6	11	35	35	0	4	43	
9	Correcaminos UAT	28	10	7	11	35	34	+1	5	42	
10	Panteras Negras GNL	28	8	9	11	38	39	−1	6	39	
11	Oxitipa Ciudad Valles	28	8	9	11	42	47	−5	4	37	
12	Bravos de Nuevo Laredo	28	7	7	14	41	58	−17	3	31	
13	Tuneros de Matehuala	28	8	2	18	39	71	−32	1	27	
14	Estudiantes Tecnológico de Nuevo Laredo	28	7	4	17	39	70	−31	1	26	
15	Atlético Altamira	28	3	5	20	22	63	−41	1	15	

Source: Tercera División FMF

== Group 13 ==
Group with 11 teams from Baja California, Sinaloa and Sonora.

=== Teams ===
Location of teams in the 2013–14 3ra División Group 13

Team	City	Home ground	Capacity	Affiliate	Official name
Águilas UAS	Culiacán, Sinaloa	Universitario UAS	3,500	–	–
Deportivo Navolato	Navolato, Sinaloa	Juventud	2,000	–	Deportivo La Cruz
Deportivo Obregón	Ciudad Obregón, Sonora	Manuel "Piri" Sagasta	4,000	–	Generales de Navojoa
Diablos Azules de Guasave	Guasave, Sinaloa	Armando "Kory" Leyson	9,000	–	–
Diablos de Ensenada	Ensenada, Baja California	Campo Nuevo Ensenada	1,000	–	–
Héroes de Caborca	Caborca, Sonora	Fidencio Hernández	3,000	–	–
Indios Cucapá	San Luis Río Colorado, Sonora	México 70	2,000	–	–
Mazatlán	Mazatlán, Sinaloa	Centro Deportivo Benito Juárez	2,000	–	–
Pescadores de Ensenada	Ensenada, Baja California	Municipal de Ensenada	7,600	–	Nuevos Valores de Occidente
Poblado Miguel Alemán	Miguel Alemán, Sonora	Alejandro López Caballero	4,000	Cimarrones de Sonora	–
Tijuana	Rosarito Beach, Baja California	Unidad Deportiva Reforma	1,000	Tijuana	–

=== League table ===
Pos	Team	Pld	W	D	L	GF	GA	GD	BP	Pts	Qualification or relegation
1	Águilas UAS	20	14	3	3	42	19	+23	0	45	Promotion play-offs
2	Poblado Miguel Alemán	20	10	7	3	40	26	+14	4	41	Reserve teams play-offs
3	Deportivo Navolato	20	9	8	3	34	20	+14	5	40	Promotion play-offs
4	Diablos de Ensenada	20	7	6	7	28	20	+8	5	32	Promotion play-offs
5	Deportivo Obregón	20	9	2	9	30	35	−5	1	30	Promotion play-offs
6	Mazatlán	20	7	5	8	25	30	−5	3	29	
7	Tijuana	20	7	7	6	22	22	0	0	28	
8	Pescadores de Ensenada	20	6	4	10	24	36	−12	2	24	
9	Indios Cucapá	20	4	6	10	31	39	−8	3	21	
10	Diablos Azules de Guasave	20	6	1	13	31	44	−13	1	20	
11	Héroes de Caborca	20	4	5	11	22	38	−16	3	20	

Source: Tercera División FMF

== Group 14 ==
Group with 9 teams from Chihuahua, Coahuila and Durango.

=== Teams ===
Location of teams in the 2013–14 3ra División Group 13

Team	City	Home ground	Capacity	Affiliate	Official name
Chinarras de Aldama	Aldama, Chihuahua	Ciudad Deportiva Chihuahua	4,000	–	–
Cobras Fútbol Premier	Chihuahua City, Chihuahua	Ciudad Deportiva Chihuahua	4,000	–	–
La Tribu de Ciudad Juárez	Ciudad Juárez, Chihuahua	20 de Noviembre	2,500	–	–
Meloneros de Matamoros	Matamoros, Coahuila	Olímpico de Matamoros	1,500	–	–
Real Magari	Ciudad Juárez, Chihuahua	20 de Noviembre	2,500	–	–
San Isidro Laguna	Torreón, Coahuila	San Isidro	3,000	–	–
Soles de Ciudad Juárez	Ciudad Juárez, Chihuahua	20 de Noviembre	2,500	–	–
Toros	Torreón, Coahuila	Unidad Deportiva Torreón	1,000	–	–
UACH	Chihuahua City, Chihuahua	Olímpico Universitario José Reyes Baeza	22,000	UACH	–

=== League table ===
Pos	Team	Pld	W	D	L	GF	GA	GD	BP	Pts	Qualification or relegation
1	UACH	16	10	3	3	42	14	+28	3	36	Reserve teams play-offs
2	San Isidro Laguna	16	11	1	4	41	12	+29	1	35	Promotion play-offs
3	La Tribu de Ciudad Juárez	16	10	4	2	27	10	+17	1	35	Promotion play-offs
4	Real Magari	16	7	4	5	28	21	+7	5	30	Promotion play-offs
5	Soles de Ciudad Juárez	16	7	0	9	25	26	−1	0	21	Promotion play-offs
6	Toros	16	7	0	9	23	30	−7	0	21	
7	Chinarras de Aldama	16	4	2	10	15	35	−20	1	15	
8	Meloneros de Matamoros	16	3	4	9	17	39	−22	2	15	
9	Cobras Fútbol Premier	16	2	2	12	11	42	−31	0	8	

Source: Tercera División FMF

== Promotion play-offs ==
=== Round of 64 ===
Team 1	Agg.	Team 2	1st leg	2nd leg
Pachuca	7–0	Sultanes de Tamazunchale	1–0	6–0
SEP Puebla	2–2 (3–4) (p.)	Estudiantes de San Andrés	1–1	1–1
Manchester Metepec	4–0	Proyecto Nuevo Chimalhuacán	1–0	3–0
Piñeros de Loma Bonita	2–2 (2–3) (p.)	Mezcalapa	0–1	2–1
Atlético de Madrid	11–0	Coyotes Neza	5–0	6–0
Sporting Canamy	2–2 (7–8) (p.)	Acapulco	1–1	1–1
Promodep Central	5–2	Guerreros de Yecapixtla	3–0	2–2
Cruz Azul Lagunas	(p.) 1–1 (4–3)	Petroleros de Poza Rica	0–1	1–0
Potros UAEM	3–2	Tigrillos Dorados MRCI	0–2	3–0
Dragones de Tabasco	2–1	Pioneros Junior	1–0	1–1
Corsarios de Campeche	4–3	Ejidatarios de Bonfil	0–3	4–0
Ángeles de la Ciudad	2–5	Lobos BUAP	1–4	1–1
Ballenas Galeana Morelos	1–2	Los Ángeles	0–2	1–0
Escuela de Alto Rendimiento	1–3	Estudiantes de Atlacomulco	0–1	1–2
Marina	2–1	Atlético UEFA	1–0	1–1
Azules de la Sección 26	(p.) 2–2 (5–4)	Deportivo Metepec	1–1	1–1
Atlético San Francisco	6–1	Querétaro	1–1	5–0
Ho Gar Matamoros	4–3	Ciudad Madero	1–1	3–2
Tepatitlán	1–1 (4–5) (p.)	Deportivo Tepic	0–1	1–0
Deportivo Obregón	1–3	Águilas UAS	1–3	0–0
Salamanca	4–3	Originales Aguacateros	1–1	3–2
Troyanos UDEM	3–1	Coyotes de Saltillo	1–1	2–0
Real Zamora	3–2	CDU Uruapan	3–1	0–1
Vaqueros	1–6	Cocula	0–0	1–6
La Tribu de Ciudad Juárez	4–1	Real Magari	2–0	2–1
Tuzos UAZ	6–1	Universidad del Fútbol	3–0	3–1
Limoneros de Apatzingán	5–2	Águilas Reales de Zacatecas	1–0	4–2
Deportivo Navolato	2–3	Diablos de Ensenada	1–3	1–0
Vaqueros Bellavista	(p.) 2–2 (5–4)	Deportivo Los Altos	0–1	2–1
Atlético Tecomán	4–6	Jaguares de Santiago	1–3	3–3
San Isidro Laguna	5–2	Soles de Ciudad Juárez	3–2	2–0
Deportivo Las Varas	6–2	Atotonilco	3–1	3–1

=== Round of 32 ===
Team 1	Agg.	Team 2	1st leg	2nd leg
Pachuca	4–3	Estudiantes de San Andrés	2–3	2–0
Manchester Metepec	1–2	Mezcalapa	0–2	1–0
Atlético de Madrid	6–1	Acapulco	1–0	5–1
Promodep Central	4–6	Cruz Azul Lagunas	1–5	3–1
Potros UAEM	5–2	Dragones de Tabasco	1–1	4–1
Corsarios de Campeche	2–5	Lobos BUAP	1–4	1–1
Los Ángeles	3–1	Estudiantes de Atlacomulco	1–0	2–1
Marina	3–2	Azules de la Sección 26	1–2	2–0
Atlético San Francisco	5–1	Ho Gar Matamoros	0–1	5–0
Deportivo Tepic	2–4	Águilas UAS	1–3	1–1
Salamanca	4–3	Troyanos UDEM	1–1	3–2
Real Zamora	(p.) 2–2 (5–4)	Cocula	2–2	0–0
Vaqueros Bellavista	(p.) 2–2 (4–2)	Jaguares de Santiago	1–1	1–1
La Tribu de Ciudad Juárez	2–0	Tuzos UAZ	0–0	2–0
Limoneros de Apatzingán	5–3	Diablos de Ensenada	1–2	4–1
San Isidro Laguna	1–3	Deportivo Las Varas	1–3	0–0

=== Final stage ===
Round of 16
1S	Pachuca	2	5	7
8S	Mezcalapa	0	0	0
3S	Atlético de Madrid	0	2	2
5S	Cruz Azul Lagunas	4	1	5
2S	Potros UAEM	3	1	4
6S	Lobos BUAP	0	0	0
4S	Marina	0	0	0
7S	Los Ángeles	1	2	3
3N	Atlético San Francisco	1	5	6
6N	Águilas UAS	2	1	3
4N	Salamanca	0	2	2
5N	Real Zamora	4	1	5
2N	Vaqueros Bellavista	5	2	7
7N	La Tribu de Ciudad Juárez	0	0	0
1N	Limoneros de Apatzingán	1	2	3 (4)
8N	Deportivo Las Varas (p.)	2	1	3 (5)

Quarter-finals
1S	Pachuca (p.)	0	1	1 (8)
5S	Cruz Azul Lagunas	0	1	1 (7)
2S	Potros UAEM	1	2	3
7S	Los Ángeles	0	1	1
3N	Atlético San Francisco	0	1	1
5N	Real Zamora	1	1	2
2N	Vaqueros Bellavista	1	1	2
8N	Deportivo Las Varas	2	1	3

Semi-finals
1S	Pachuca	2	4	6
2S	Potros UAEM	1	1	2
5N	Real Zamora (p.)	2	1	3 (4)
8N	Deportivo Las Varas	1	2	3 (2)

Final
1S	Pachuca	1	7	8
5N	Real Zamora	0	2	2

==== Round of 16 ====
Team 1	Agg.	Team 2	1st leg	2nd leg
Pachuca	7–0	Mezcalapa	2–0	5–0
Atlético de Madrid	2–5	Cruz Azul Lagunas	0–4	2–1
Potros UAEM	4–0	Lobos BUAP	3–0	1–0
Marina	0–3	Los Ángeles	0–1	0–2
Atlético San Francisco	6–3	Águilas UAS	1–2	5–1
Salamanca	2–5	Real Zamora	0–4	2–1
Vaqueros Bellavista	7–0	La Tribu de Ciudad Juárez	5–0	2–0
Limoneros de Apatzingán	3–3 (4–5) (p.)	Deportivo Las Varas	1–2	2–1

===== First leg =====
7 May 2014	Cruz Azul Lagunas	4–0	Atlético de Madrid	Lagunas
15:00	A. Gómez 48', 62'; López 64'; J. Gómez 85'	Report		Stadium: Estadio Cruz Azul; Attendance: 600

7 May 2014	Lobos BUAP	0–3	Potros UAEM	Puebla City
15:00		Report	Olvera 24'; Villegas 48'; Ruíz 90+1'	Stadium: Ciudad Universitaria Puebla; Attendance: 100

7 May 2014	Los Ángeles	1–0	Marina	Puebla City
15:30	Flores 17'	Report		Stadium: Ex Hacienda San José Maravillas; Attendance: 300

7 May 2014	Real Zamora	4–0	Salamanca	Zamora
20:00	Rosas 2'; Mendoza 76'; Negrete 89'; Moragrega 90'	Report		Stadium: Unidad Deportiva El Chamizal; Attendance: 300

7 May 2014	Águilas UAS	2–1	Atlético San Francisco	Culiacán
20:00	Valdez 37', 42'	Report	Mesillas 6'	Stadium: Estadio Universitario UAS; Attendance: 1,200

8 May 2014	La Tribu de Ciudad Juárez	0–5	Vaqueros Bellavista	Ciudad Juárez
13:00		Report	Álvarez 11', 42'; Betancourt 14'; Soto 50'; Higareda 56'	Stadium: Estadio 20 de Noviembre; Attendance: 200

8 May 2014	Deportivo Las Varas	2–1	Limoneros de Apatzingán	Xalisco
16:00	H. García 64'; L. García 70'	Report	Cruz 9'	Stadium: Unidad Deportiva Landereñas; Attendance: 250

8 May 2014	Mezcalapa	0–2	Pachuca	Raudales Malpaso
16:00		Report	Vázquez 64'; González 86'	Stadium: Estadio Adolfo López Mateos "La Vaporera"; Attendance: 800

===== Second leg =====
10 May 2014	Atlético de Madrid	2–1 (2–5 agg.)	Cruz Azul Lagunas	Tlalpan, Mexico City
11:00	Vera 16'; Ruíz 90+2' (own)	Report	Bosquez 4'	Stadium: Centro Social y Deportivo Rosario Iglesias; Attendance: 300

10 May 2014	Marina	0–2 (0–3 agg.)	Los Ángeles	Xochimilco, Mexico City
16:30		Report	Méndez 47', 72'	Stadium: Estadio Valentín González; Attendance: 500

10 May 2014	Atlético San Francisco	5–1 (6–3 agg.)	Águilas UAS	San Francisco del Rincón
17:00	Puga 10', 32', 36'; Martínez 29'; Mesillas 59'	Report	Valdéz 3'	Stadium: Estadio Domingo Velázquez; Attendance: 600

10 May 2014	Salamanca	2–1 (2–5 agg.)	Real Zamora	Salamanca
17:00	Rivera 34'; Vázquez 40'	Report	Alvarado 59'	Stadium: Estadio El Molinito; Attendance: 2,000

10 May 2014	Potros UAEM	1–0 (4–0 agg.)	Lobos BUAP	Toluca
19:00	Villegas 25'	Report		Stadium: Estadio Universitario Alberto "Chivo" Córdoba; Attendance: 300

11 May 2014	Pachuca	5–0 (7–0 agg.)	Mezcalapa	San Agustín Tlaxiaca
12:00	Venegas 3', 42'; Cortés 68'; González 80'; Tecpanécatl 90'	Report		Stadium: Universidad del Fútbol; Attendance: 50

11 May 2014	Limoneros de Apatzingán	2–1 (3–3 agg.) (4–5 p)	Deportivo Las Varas	Apatzingán
15:30	Covarrubias 80'; Montoya 85'	Report	Arias 17'	Stadium: Unidad Deportiva Adolfo López Mateos; Attendance: 1,400

11 May 2014	Vaqueros Bellavista	2–0 (7–0 agg.)	La Tribu de Ciudad Juárez	Acatlán de Juárez
17:00	Soto 10'; Robledo 38'	Report		Stadium: Estadio Juan Bigotón Jasso; Attendance: 300

==== Quarter-finals ====
Team 1	Agg.	Team 2	1st leg	2nd leg
Pachuca	(p.) 1–1 (8–7)	Cruz Azul Lagunas	0–0	1–1
Potros UAEM	3–1	Los Ángeles	1–0	2–1
Atlético San Francisco	1–2	Real Zamora	0–1	1–1
Vaqueros Bellavista	2–3	Deportivo Las Varas	1–2	1–1

===== First leg =====
14 May 2014	Los Ángeles	0–1	Potros UAEM	Puebla City
12:00		Report	Villegas 46'	Stadium: Ex Hacienda San José Maravillas; Attendance: 100

14 May 2014	Real Zamora	1–0	Atlético San Francisco	Zamora
20:00	Rosas 51'	Report		Stadium: Unidad Deportiva El Chamizal; Attendance: 1,500

15 May 2014	Cruz Azul Lagunas	0–0	Pachuca	Lagunas
15:00		Report		Stadium: Estadio Cruz Azul; Attendance: 500

15 May 2014	Deportivo Las Varas	2–1	Vaqueros Bellavista	Xalisco
16:00	Celedon 49'; García 83'	Report	Velázquez 38'	Stadium: Unidad Deportiva Landereñas; Attendance: 400

===== Second leg =====
17 May 2014	Atlético San Francisco	1–1 (1–2 agg.)	Real Zamora	San Francisco del Rincón
17:00	Sánchez 18'	Report	Rosas 65'	Stadium: Estadio Domingo Velázquez; Attendance: 1,000

17 May 2014	Potros UAEM	2–1 (3–1 agg.)	Los Ángeles	Toluca
19:00	Martínez 26'; Villegas 65'	Report	Zaragoza 20'	Stadium: Estadio Universitario Alberto "Chivo" Córdoba; Attendance: 1,200

18 May 2014	Pachuca	1–1 (1–1 agg.) (8–7 p)	Cruz Azul Lagunas	San Agustín Tlaxiaca
12:00	Tecpanécatl 80'	Report	López 54'	Stadium: Universidad del Fútbol; Attendance: 400

18 May 2014	Vaqueros Bellavista	1–1 (2–3 agg.)	Deportivo Las Varas	Acatlán de Juárez
17:00	Higareda 21'	Report	Rios 88'	Stadium: Estadio Juan Bigotón Jasso; Attendance: 700

==== Semi-finals ====
Team 1	Agg.	Team 2	1st leg	2nd leg
Pachuca	6–2	Potros UAEM	2–1	4–1
Real Zamora	(p.) 3–3 (4–2)	Deportivo Las Varas	2–1	1–2

===== First leg =====
21 May 2014	Deportivo Las Varas	1–2	Real Zamora	Xalisco
16:00	García 52'	Report	Alvarado 44'; Rosas 67'	Stadium: Unidad Deportiva Landereñas; Attendance: 800

22 May 2014	Potros UAEM	1–2	Pachuca	Toluca
19:00	Graniolatti 53'	Report	González 57'; Graniolatti 67' (own)	Stadium: Estadio Universitario Alberto "Chivo" Córdoba; Attendance: 2,500

===== Second leg =====
24 May 2014	Real Zamora	1–2 (3–3 agg.) (4–2 p)	Deportivo Las Varas	Zamora
20:00	Rosas 41'	Report	Lizárraga 46', 69'	Stadium: Unidad Deportiva El Chamizal; Attendance: 5,000

25 May 2014	Pachuca	4–1 (5–2 agg.)	Potros UAEM	San Agustín Tlaxiaca
12:00	González 1', 75'; Zendejas 57'; Bojórquez 85'	Report	Villegas 37'	Stadium: Universidad del Fútbol; Attendance: 500

==== Final ====
Team 1	Agg.	Team 2	1st leg	2nd leg
Pachuca	8–2	Real Zamora	1–0	7–2

===== First leg =====
29 May 2014	Real Zamora	0–1	Pachuca	Zamora
20:00		Report	González 65'	Stadium: Unidad Deportiva El Chamizal; Attendance: 5,000

===== Second leg =====
1 June 2014	Pachuca	7–2 (8–2 agg.)	Real Zamora	Pachuca
12:00	Zendejas 22', 33', 69', 83'; Cortés 37', 54'; González 73'	Report	Rosas 6'; Vallejo 9'	Stadium: Estadio Hidalgo; Attendance: 2,000

2013–14 winners

1st title

== Reserve teams play–offs ==
Quarter-finals
2	Cruz Azul Dublán (p.)	3	3	6 (4)
7	Escuela de Fútbol Chivas	4	2	6 (2)
1	Estudiantes Tecos	1	2	3 (4)
8	Atlas (p.)	1	2	3 (5)
4	Tigres SD	1	0	1
5	Monterrey	1	1	2
3	UACH	0	1	1
6	Poblado Miguel Alemán	1	5	6

Semi-finals
2	Cruz Azul Dublán (p.)	3	0	3 (4)
8	Atlas	1	2	3 (3)
5	Monterrey	1	2	3
6	Poblado Miguel Alemán	3	1	4

Final
2	Cruz Azul Dublán	1	1	2
6	Poblado Miguel Alemán	4	1	5

== See also ==
- Tercera División de México
