= Gustavo Carmona =

Mexican footballer (born 1995)

Personal information
- Full name: Gustavo Carmona De Ita
- Date of birth: 25 May 1995 (age 31)
- Place of birth: Puebla, Puebla, Mexico
- Height: 1.73 m (5 ft 8 in)
- Position: Midfielder

Team information
- Current team: Salamanca UDS
- Number: 14

Youth career
- –2014: Lobos BUAP

Senior career*
Years	Team	Apps	(Gls)
2014–2019	Lobos BUAP	8	(1)
2014–2015	→ Lobos BUAP Tercera	44	(6)
2015–2018	→ Lobos BUAP Premier	54	(4)
2019	→ Cocodrilos de Tabasco (loan)	14	(0)
2019–2020	Salamanca B	26	(1)
2020–2022	Ribert	16	(2)
2022–	Salamanca UDS	90	(2)
- * Club domestic league appearances and goals as of 14 September 2024

Gustavo Carmona De Ita (born 25 May 1995) is a Mexican professional footballer who plays as a midfielder for Spanish club Salamanca UDS.
