= Luis González (footballer, born 1997) =

Mexican footballer (born 1997)

Personal information
- Full name: Luis Enrique González Bustamante
- Date of birth: 8 February 1997 (age 29)
- Place of birth: Chihuahua, Mexico
- Height: 1.81 m (5 ft 11 in)
- Position: Midfielder

Senior career*
Years	Team	Apps	(Gls)
2017–2018	Pachuca	1	(0)
2018–2019	→ Zacatecas (loan)	1	(0)
2019–2022	Tlaxcala	13	(0)
- * Club domestic league appearances and goals as of 24 April 2022

Luis Enrique González Bustamante (born 8 February 1997) is a former Mexican professional footballer who played as a midfielder.
