= San Jose de Gracia, Jalisco =

San José de Gracia
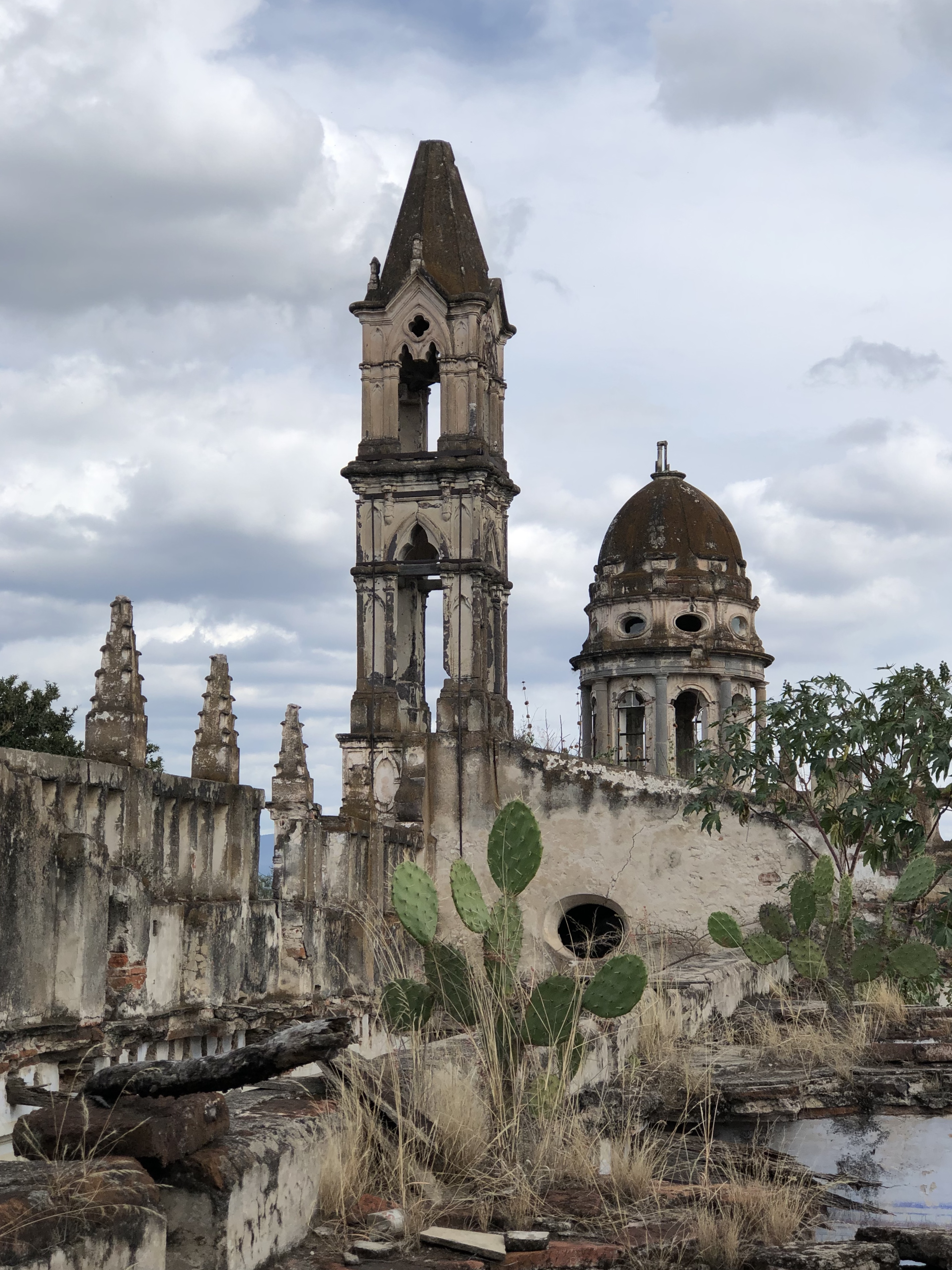
- Nickname: San José
- Interactive map of San José de Gracia
- Coordinates: 20°40′28″N 102°34′01″W
- Country: Mexico
- State: Jalisco
- Municipality: Tepatitlán, Jalisco
- Established: 1793
- Elevation: 1,900 m (6,233 ft)

Population (2020)
  - Total: 5,441
- Time zone: UTC-6 (Central Standard Time)
  - Summer (DST): UTC-5 (Central Daylight Time)
- Postal Code: 47728
- Website: https://www.sanjosedegracia2018.com/

The town of San José de Gracia is located in the township of Tepatitlán, Jalisco in the Altos Sur region (State of Jalisco) at 95 km from the city of Guadalajara toward the northeast. Founded in the year 1793, it is situated at an altitude of 1980 m, with a pleasant temperate climate and gentle prevailing winds from the east. Its neighboring towns are Capilla de Guadalupe, San Ignacio Cerro Gordo, Arandas, St. Francis of Assisi, and Tototlán Atotonilco.

== History ==
San José de Gracia is considered to have originated in the early 19th century, when the brothers Francisco, Salvador, Antonio Rafael, and José Antonio Hernández Padilla divided the land among themselves, settling there with their families and laborers. While no formal founding document exists, one can say that the first inhabitants of what would become San José de Gracia began to settle around that time. The first chapel was built by 1822, and a permanent vicar served until 1867. Construction of the current San José parish church began on March 19, 1889, marking the start of a defined urban layout. It was officially established as a parish on May 15, 1910, with Fermín Padilla as its first parish priest. From the promulgation of the Constitution in 1917, which established the structure of the municipality as known today, the population of San José de Gracia remained within the municipality of Tepatitlán, with the category of Political Commissariat. San José remained so until 1939, when the council of Tepatitlán appointed the first Delegate, thus becoming a Political Delegation.

== Climate and ecosystem ==
San José de Gracia has a semi-dry climate with an average annual temperature of 25°C, maximum temperatures of 33 to 35°C in May, and minimums of 3 to 5°C in January, although temperatures at some points reach 0°C during the winter. Annual precipitation ranges from 900 to 1000 mm, with the rainy season typically June to September.

=== Relief ===
Geology. The region is characterized by predominantly igneous rocks of volcanic origin, specifically the basalt, as well as rocks, called rhyolite, "red quarry, which is important to be part of the raw material from which the temple was built St. Joseph parish and the tepetate, just origin, as representative of the parish church. Soils predominate called Ferric Luvisol, soil fine-textured, highly susceptible to erosion than are characterized by an enrichment of clay and are very acidic. They are "red soils" characteristic of entire region and encourage the planting of agave cultivation blue for the case of maize in optimal conditions moisture and fertility, provide very good returns. Soils

The dominant soils belong to the type luvisol ferric Planosol eútrico and Feozem háplico and as soil partners include the Pelican and Planosol vertisol molic soil.

=== Flora ===
Plant associations are composed of thornscrub northeast and natural grasslands located east, south-central and west, is observed cloud forest areas of runoff Cerro Chico and Cerro Gordo, are likewise oak forests in the upper part of the hills mentioned, from the height above 2,000 mar.4 level

=== Fauna ===
Some species such as rabbit, hare, coyote, fox, skunk, armadillo, deer, reptiles and various birds.

== Natural Resources ==
The natural wealth available to the displayed forest dominated by white oak species, pine, oak, mesquite, ash, and licorice, mainly.

=== Land Use ===
Most agricultural land has a use and livestock, in addition to the planting of mezcal. Tenure land mostly corresponds to the property private.

=== Hydrology ===
The area belongs to the Lerma-Chapala-Santiago hydrological region, the Santiago-Guadalajara basin, and the Zula River subbasin. Within this area is Las Hormigas stream, a tributary of the Zula River. The place is characterized by the potential for subsurface water.

=== Topography ===
In the area are: to be 0 to 2% occupy most of the area to the west, South and Southeast unsuitable for urban development by little inclination that hinders runoff stormwater; outstanding 2 to 5% to the north, northeast and southwest, suitable for urban development; slopes of 5 to 15%, north and northeast over the slopes of Cerro Chico, and conditioned for the urban development, but for agriculture and livestock; slope greater than 15%, located to the north and northeast of the area, on the slopes of Cerro Chico to from an elevation of 1950 meters above the mar.

== Events ==
1. Celebrations in Honor of Saint Joseph - May
2. Festivities in honor of the Virgin of Guadalupe - December
3. Festival commemorating the centenary of the Parish of "San José" - May 15, 2010
