= Ejidatarios de Bonfil =

- Full name: Club Deportivo Ejidatarios de Bonfil
- Nickname(s): Los Ejidatarios ('The Communal Lands Holders')
- Founded: 2009; 16 years ago
- Ground: La Parcela, Cancún, Quintana Roo, Mexico
- Capacity: TBA
- Chairman: Ismael Mendoza Martínez
- League: Tercera División de México
| Home colours | Away colours | Third colours |

Club Deportivo Ejidatarios de Bonfil is a Mexican football club that plays in the Tercera División de México. The club is based in Cancún, Mexico.

After a seven-year absence, the club returned to play in 2024.

== See also ==
- Football in Mexico
