= Lanceros de Cosoleacaque =

Mexican football club

Limoneros de Fútbol, A.C.
- Full name: Club Limoneros de Fútbol Asociación Civil
- Nickname(s): Limoneros
- Founded: 2005
- Ground: U Deportiva La Choca, Cosoleacaque, Veracruz
- Capacity: 1,000
- Chairman: Gudalupe Elvira Zamora
- Manager: Mario Elvira
- League: Tercera División de México
Home colours	Away colours	Third colours

Lanceros de Cosoleacaque is a Mexican football club that plays in the Tercera División de México. The club is based in Lanceros de Cosoleacaque, Veracruz.

== See also ==
- Football in Mexico
- Veracruz
- Tercera División de México
