= Ángeles de la Ciudad F.C. =

Ángeles de la Ciudad
- Full name: Club Ángeles de la Ciudad F.C.
- Nickname(s): Ángeles (Angels); Capitalinos (The Inhabitants of the capital)
- Founded: 2012; 13 years ago
- Ground: Centro Social y Deportivo Rosario Iglesias; Coyoacán, Mexico City
- Capacity: 600
- League: Tercera División de México - Group IV
- 2018–19: Current
Home colours	Away colours

Ángeles de la Ciudad is a Mexican football club that plays in the Tercera División de México. The club is based in Coyoacán, Mexico City.

== History ==
The team was founded in 2012 as a social project of the Government of Mexico City with the objective of combating social exclusion and the risk of drug use among youth from socially disadvantaged sectors.

== See also ==
- Futbol in Mexico
- Mexico City
- Tercera División de México
