= Tigrillos Dorados MRCI =

- Full name: Tigrillos Dorados MRCI
- Nickname(s): Tigres(Tigers)
- Founded: 14 March 2008; 17 years ago
- Dissolved: 4 July 2018; 6 years ago
- Ground: Estadio Independiente MRCI, San Jerónimo Tlacochahuaya, Oaxaca, Mexico
- Capacity: 3,500
- Owner: MRCI
- Chairman: José María Ramírez
- Manager: Jorge Luis Ramos
- League: Tercera División de México - Group III
- Apertura 2017: Preseason
Home colours	Away colours	Third colours

Tigrillos Dorados MRCI was a football club that plays in the Tercera División de México. The club was based in Oaxaca, Oaxaca, Mexico.

== History ==
The club was founded on 14 March 2008, as an indoor soccer club and soon joined a local soccer league in Oaxaca. In 2009 the club joined the Tercera División de México. The club also plays basketball and baseball, both in male and female local leagues. In 2018, Tigrillos Dorados merged with Chapulineros de Oaxaca, in this way, the team disappeared.

== See also ==
- Football in Mexico
