= Estudiantes de Xalapa =

Mexican football club

- Full name: Estudiantes de Xalapa
- Nickname: Buhos
- Founded: 2001
- Ground: El Canizo, Xalapa, Veracruz
- Capacity: 1,000
- Chairman: Andres Espinoza Lopz
- Manager: Abel Garcia Falfan
- League: Tercera División de México
Home colours	Away colours	Third colours

Estudiantes de Xalapa is a Mexican football club that plays in the Tercera División de México. The club is based in Xalapa, Veracruz.

== See also ==
- Football in Mexico
