= Núcleo Deportivo y de Espectáculos Ameca =

Multi-use stadium in Ameca, Jalisco, Mexico

Coordinates: 20°32′53″N 104°4′6″W

The Núcleo Deportivo y de Espectáculos Ameca is a multi-use stadium located in Ameca, Jalisco, Mexico. It is currently used mostly for football matches and is the home stadium for Catedráticos Élite F.C. The stadium has a capacity of 6,000 people.
