= Deportivo Nuevo Chimalhuacán =

Mexican football club

Nuevo Chimalhuacán
- Full name: Club Deportivo Nuevo Chimalhuacán
- Nickname(s): Guerreros (The Warriors); Chimecos (The Chimalhuacan natives)
- Founded: 2011; 14 years ago
- Dissolved: June 2020; 4 years ago
- Ground: Deportivo La Laguna, Chimalhuacán, State of Mexico, Mexico
- Capacity: 2,000
- Owner: José Bastida Constantino
- Chairman: José Bastida Constantino
- League: Liga Premier - Serie B
- 2019–20: 13th, Group II
Home colours	Away colours

The Club Deportivo Nuevo Chimalhuacán, commonly known as Nuevo Chimalhuacán, is a Mexican football club based in Chimalhuacán. The club was founded in 2011, and currently plays in the Serie B of Liga Premier.

== Players ==
=== Current squad ===
As of January 31, 2020
