= Piñeros de Loma Bonita =

- Full name: Piñeros de Loma Bonita Futbol Club
- Nickname(s): The Orange Ones
- Founded: 2000; 25 years ago
- Ground: Estadio 20 de Noviembre; Loma Bonita, Oaxaca, Mexico
- Capacity: 1,000
- Chairman: Juan Alberto Gómez Batalla
- Manager: Arturo Benítez
- League: Tercera División de México - Group III
- Apertura 2017: Preseason
Home colours	Away colours	Third colours

Piñeros de Loma Bonita is a Mexican football club that plays in group 2 in the Tercera División de México. The club is based in Loma Bonita, Mexico .

== See also ==
- Football in Mexico
