= Real San Cosme =

- Full name: Imperio Real San Cosme
- Nickname(s): Aguilas (Eagles)'
- Founded: 2007; 18 years ago
- Ground: Ciudad Deportiva Churubusco; Monterrey, Nuevo León, Mexico
- Capacity: 1,000
- Chairman: Alejandro Rivera
- Manager: Felipe Arévalo
- League: Liga TDP - Group XV
- 2020–21: 7th – Group XII
Home colours	Away colours

Imperio Real San Cosme is an association football team that plays in the Liga TDP, in the group 15. the club is based in Reynosa, Mexico, however, the team doesn't have an official stadium.

The team originally played in Mazatecochco de José María Morelos, Tlaxcala, but, in 2012 the team's franchise was rented to a new club called Águilas del Altiplano, that played in Santa Cruz Tlaxcala. In 2013, the team was moved to Amecameca. Between 2015 and 2017, Real San Cosme rented its registration to Chivas PROAN, a C.D. Guadalajara affiliated team that played in San Juan de los Lagos.

In 2017-18 season, the team register was rented to a team called Real Xalapa.

In 2018, the team was moved to Valle Hermoso and was renamed as Vallehermoso F.C., however, in January 2019 it was announced that the team was moved to Reynosa for reasons of security and infrastructure, the club finished the 2018-19 season without having an official stadium, playing most of their matches in the opposing team's field, except on some occasions that they used the Estadio El Hogar in Matamoros, Tamaulipas.

For the 2019–20 season the team register was rented to another team called Regio Soccer from Monterrey. For the 2020–21 season the team returned as Imperio Real San Cosme, and they continued playing in Monterrey.
