= Xiutetelco =

Coordinates: 19°48′N 97°20′W

- Municipality
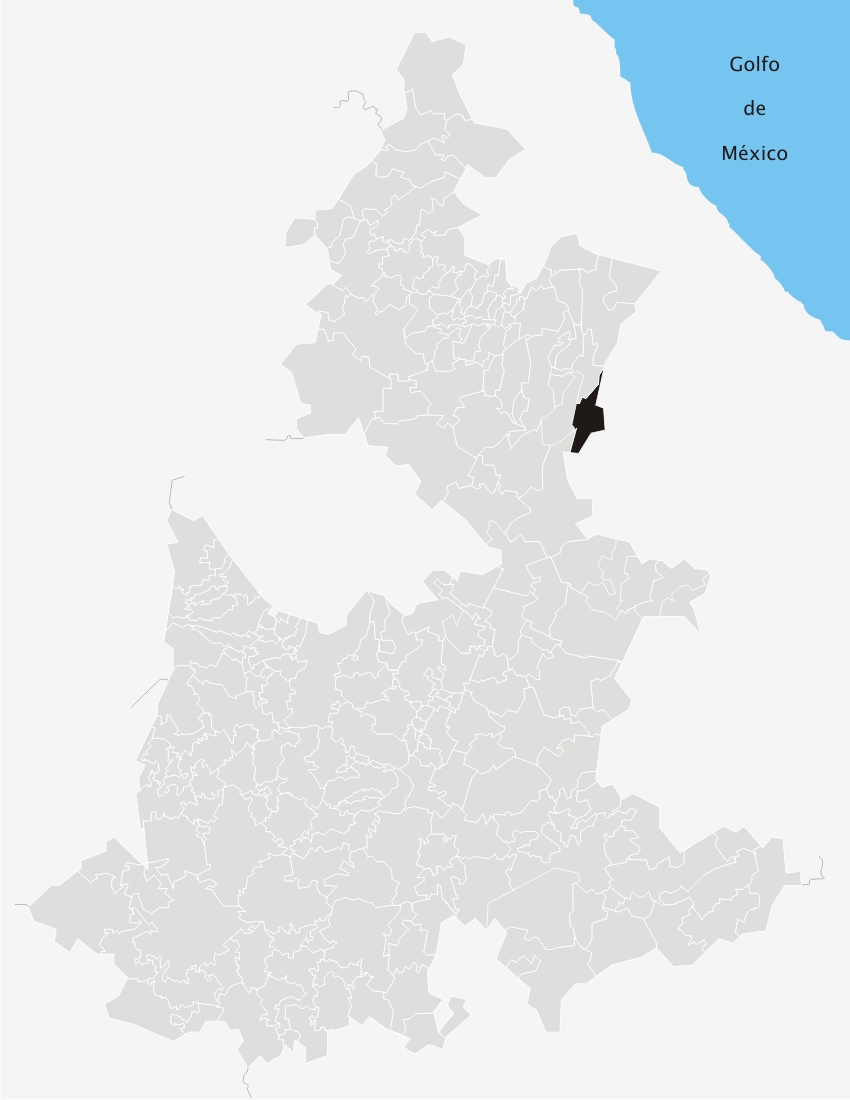
- Location of Xiutetelco Municipality, Puebla

- Coat of arms
- Interactive map of Xiutetelco
- Country: Mexico
- State: Puebla
- Time zone: UTC-6 (Zona Centro)

Xiutetelco is a municipality in the Mexican state of Puebla.
