= 2020–21 Liga TDP season =

Liga TDP
- Season: 2020–21
- Dates: 25 September 2020 – July 2021
- Champions: Fuertes de Fortín (1st title)
- Matches: 2,693
- Goals: 8,494 (3.15 per match)
- Top goalscorer: Ricardo Alba (41 goals)
- Stats are from the regular season only

The 2020–21 Liga TDP season is the fourth-tier football league of Mexico. The tournament began on 25 September 2020 and finished on 3 July 2021.

== Competition format ==
The Tercera División (Third Division) is divided into 14 groups. For the 2009/2010 season, the format of the tournament has been reorganized to a home and away format, which all teams will play in their respective group. The 14 groups consist of teams which are eligible to play in the liguilla de ascenso for two promotion spots, teams who are affiliated with teams in the Liga MX, Liga de Expansión MX and Liga Premier and development teams, which are not eligible for promotion but will play that who the better team in a sixteen team filial playoff tournament for the entire season.

The league format allows participating franchises to rent their place to another team, so some clubs compete with a different name than the one registered with the FMF.

Due to the suspension of the previous season, for the 2020–21 season there will be four promotions to the Liga Premier. Two to Serie A and two to Serie B.

== Group 1 ==
Group with 12 teams from Campeche, Quintana Roo, Tabasco and Yucatán. Note: Delfines Márquez was announced as a participant for the season, but was excluded from the league after week 15 for failing to fulfill his obligations as an affiliated club.

Location of teams in the 2020–21 Liga TDP Group 1 (Campeche)
Location of teams in the 2020–21 Liga TDP Group 1 (Quintana Roo)
Location of teams in the 2020–21 Liga TDP Group 1 (Tabasco)
Location of teams in the 2020–21 Liga TDP Group 1 (Yucatán)

=== Teams ===
Team	City	Home ground	Capacity	Affiliate	Official Name
Campeche	Campeche, Campeche	La Muralla de Kin-Ha	500	—	—
Cancún	Cancún, Quintana Roo	CEDAR Cancún	500	Cancún	—
Cantera Venados	Mérida, Yucatán	Carlos Iturralde	15,087	Venados	—
Corsarios de Campeche	Campeche, Campeche	Universitario de Campeche	4,000	—	—
Deportiva Venados	Tamanché, Yucatán	Alonso Diego Molina	2,500	—	—
Inter Playa del Carmen	Playa del Carmen, Quintana Roo	Unidad Deportiva Mario Villanueva Madrid	7,500	Inter Playa del Carmen	—
Mayas Hunucmá	Hunucmá, Yucatán	Unidad Deportiva Hunucmá	1,000	—	—
Pejelagartos de Tabasco	Villahermosa, Tabasco	Olímpico de Villahermosa	12,000	—	—
Pioneros Junior	Cancún, Quintana Roo	Cancún 86	6,390	Pioneros de Cancún	—
Progreso	Progreso, Yucatán	20 de Noviembre	3,000	Venados	—
Tulum	Tulum, Quintana Roo	Héctor Díaz de la Peña	2,000	—	—

=== League table ===
Pos	Team	Pld	W	D	L	GF	GA	GD	Pts	Qualification
1	Cancún	20	10	6	4	28	22	+6	40	Advance to Liguilla de No Ascenso
2	Deportiva Venados	20	11	4	5	41	18	+23	38	Advance to Liguilla de Ascenso
3	Inter Playa del Carmen	20	8	8	4	31	25	+6	35	Advance to Liguilla de Ascenso
4	Corsarios de Campeche	20	9	4	7	26	26	0	34	Advance to Liguilla de Ascenso
5	Campeche	20	7	6	7	38	28	+10	30	
6	Tulum	20	7	6	7	26	30	−4	29	Advance to Liguilla de No Ascenso
7	Mayas Hunucmá	20	6	8	6	20	20	0	29	
8	Pioneros Júnior	20	7	5	8	23	24	−1	29	
9	Cantera Venados	20	6	7	7	23	25	−2	29	Advance to Liguilla de No Ascenso
10	Progreso	20	7	1	12	21	37	−16	22	
11	Pejelagartos de Tabasco	20	2	5	13	15	37	−22	14	
12	Delfines Márquez	0	0	0	0	0	0	0	0	Excluded

Updated to match(es) played on 22 May 2021. Source: LigaTDP

== Group 2 ==
Group with 15 teams from Puebla and Veracruz.

=== Teams ===
Location of teams in the 2020–21 Liga TDP Group 2 (Puebla)
Location of teams in the 2020–21 Liga TDP Group 2 (Veracruz)

Team	City	Home ground	Capacity	Affiliate	Official Name
Alpha	Puebla, Puebla	Club Alpha Cancha 3	600	—	—
Atlético Boca del Río	Boca del Río, Veracruz	Unidad Deportiva Hugo Sánchez	2,500	—	—
Colegio Once México	Córdoba, Veracruz	Rafael Murillo Vidal	3,800	—	—
Delfines UGM	Nogales, Veracruz	UGM Nogales	1,500	—	—
Fuertes de Fortín	Fortín de las Flores, Veracruz	Unidad Deportiva Eliezer Morales	2,000	—	—
Lobos Puebla	Puebla, Puebla	Unidad Deportiva Mario Vázquez Raña	800	—	—
Los Ángeles	Puebla, Puebla	Unidad Deportiva San Juan Cuautlancingo	500	—	—
Papanes de Papantla	Papantla, Veracruz	Fénix Solidaridad	3,000	—	—
Petroleros de Poza Rica	Poza Rica, Veracruz	Heriberto Jara Corona	10,000	—	—
Reales de Puebla	Chachapa, Puebla	Unidad Deportiva Chachapa	1,000	—	—
Sozca	Lerdo de Tejada, Veracruz	Miguel Seoane Lavín	1,000	—	—
Tehuacán	Tehuacán, Puebla	Polideportivo La Huizachera	1,000	—	—
Toros de Jamapa	Jamapa, Veracruz	Unidad Deportiva Los Cachorros	1,000	—	Toros Huatusco
Tuxpan	Tuxpan, Veracruz	Álvaro Lorenzo Fernández	5,000	—	—
Zaragoza	Puebla, Puebla	Unidad Deportiva Mario Vázquez Raña	800	—	—

=== League table ===
Pos	Team	Pld	W	D	L	GF	GA	GD	Pts	Qualification
1	Tuxpan	28	19	6	3	56	18	+38	66	Advance to Liguilla de Ascenso
2	Fuertes de Fortín	28	18	7	3	63	25	+38	64	Advance to Liguilla de Ascenso
3	Papanes de Papantla	28	19	1	8	78	29	+49	59	Advance to Liguilla de Ascenso
4	Delfines UGM	28	16	6	6	54	28	+26	57	Advance to Liguilla de Ascenso
5	Petroleros de Poza Rica	28	18	2	8	59	33	+26	56	Advance to Liguilla de Ascenso
6	Alpha	28	13	6	9	56	30	+26	48	
7	Colegio Once México	28	13	6	9	43	37	+6	48	
8	Tehuacán	28	11	6	11	40	46	−6	42	
9	Los Ángeles	28	11	4	13	30	42	−12	40	
10	Zaragoza	28	8	7	13	32	43	−11	36	Advance to Liguilla de No Ascenso
11	Sozca	28	8	6	14	36	46	−10	33	
12	Reales de Puebla	28	6	6	16	31	58	−27	28	
13	Atlético Boca del Río	28	6	4	18	24	52	−28	22	
14	Lobos Puebla	28	4	4	20	19	81	−62	18	
15	Toros de Jamapa	28	3	3	22	20	73	−53	13	

Updated to match(es) played on 22 May 2021. Source: LigaTDP

== Group 3 ==
Group with 10 teams from Chiapas and Oaxaca.

=== Teams ===
Location of teams in the 2020–21 Liga TDP Group 3 (Chiapas)
Location of teams in the 2020–21 Liga TDP Group 3 (Oaxaca)

Team	City	Home ground	Capacity	Affiliate	Official name
Alebrijes de Oaxaca	Oaxaca, Oaxaca	Tecnológico de Oaxaca	14,598	Alebrijes de Oaxaca	–
Atlético Ixtepec	Ixtepec, Oaxaca	Brena Torres	1,000	—	–
CEFOR Chiapas	Tuxtla Gutiérrez, Chiapas	Flor de Sospo	3,000	–	–
Cruz Azul Lagunas	Lagunas, Oaxaca	Cruz Azul	2,000	Cruz Azul	–
Dragones de Oaxaca	Santa María del Tule, Oaxaca	Unidad Deportiva Santa María del Tule	1,000	–	–
Jaguares Negros UDS	Comitán de Domínguez, Chiapas	Roberto Ortíz Solís	2,000	—	—
Lechuzas UPGCH	Tuxtla Gutiérrez, Chiapas	Flor de Sospo	3,000	–	–
Milenarios de Oaxaca	Oaxaca City, Oaxaca	General Manuel Cabrera Carrasquedo	2,000	–	–
Porteños	Salina Cruz, Oaxaca	Heriberto Kehoe Vincent	2,000	—	—
UNICACH	Tuxtla Gutiérrez, Chiapas	UNICACH	1,000	–	–

=== League table ===
Pos	Team	Pld	W	D	L	GF	GA	GD	Pts	Qualification
1	Cruz Azul Lagunas	27	17	6	4	52	14	+38	61	Advance to Liguilla de Ascenso
2	Lechuzas UPGCH	27	16	5	6	58	27	+31	54	Advance to Liguilla de Ascenso
3	Porteños	27	14	8	5	36	27	+9	54	Advance to Liguilla de Ascenso
4	Cefor Chiapas	27	12	6	9	56	35	+21	45	
5	Alebrijes de Oaxaca	27	12	6	9	35	30	+5	45	Advance to Liguilla de No Ascenso
6	UNICACH	27	12	4	11	34	38	−4	41	
7	Universidad del Sureste	27	11	6	10	44	40	+4	40	
8	Atlético Ixtepec	27	6	5	16	37	67	−30	24	
9	Dragones de Oaxaca	27	4	5	18	33	68	−35	22	
10	Milenarios de Oaxaca	27	2	7	18	16	55	−39	19	

Updated to match(es) played on 22 May 2021. Source: LigaTDP

== Group 4 ==
Group with 20 teams from Mexico City and Greater Mexico City. Note: Promodep Central was enrolled in the season, but the team was retired after week 23.

=== Teams ===
Location of teams in the 2020–21 Liga TDP Group 4
Location of teams in the 2020–21 Liga TDP Group 4 (Huehuetoca)

Team	City	Home ground	Capacity	Affiliate	Official name
Álamos	Venustiano Carranza, Mexico City	Deportivo Plutarco Elías Calles	300	–	–
Aragón	Gustavo A. Madero, Mexico City	Deportivo Francisco Zarco	500	Pachuca	Atlético San Juan de Aragón
Atlético Estado de México	Ecatepec, State of México	Canchas Titanium	1,000	–	–
Aztecas AMF Soccer	Gustavo A. Madero, Mexico City	Deportivo Francisco Zarco	500	–	–
Azucareros de Tezonapa	Cuautitlán Izcalli, State of Mexico	Hugo Sánchez	3,500	–	–
Club Carsaf	Gustavo A. Madero, Mexico City	Deportivo Lázaro Cárdenas	1,000	–	–
Chilangos	Benito Juárez, Mexico City	Deportivo Benito Juárez	1,000	–	–
Cuervos Blancos	Cuautitlán, State of Mexico	Los Pinos	5,000	–	–
Cuervos de Silver Soccer	Xochimilco, Mexico City	San Isidro	1,200	–	–
Halcones de Rayón	Valle de Chalco, State of Mexico	Unidad Deportiva Luis Donaldo Colosio	3,000	–	–
Loyalty	Huehuetoca, State of Mexico	Deportivo Tuzos Jorobas	500	–	–
Marina	Xochimilco, Mexico City	Deportivo Plutarco Elías Calles	300	Marina	–
Muxes	Venustiano Carranza, Mexico City	Deportivo Plutarco Elías Calles	300	–	–
Oceanía	Venustiano Carranza, Mexico City	Deportivo Oceanía	1,000	–	–
Panteras Neza	Nezahualcoyotl, State of Mexico	Metropolitano	4,000	–	Valle de Xico F.C.
Politécnico	Venustiano Carranza, Mexico City	Deportivo Eduardo Molina	500	–	–
R-Reyes	Miguel Hidalgo, Mexico City	Deportivo Plutarco Elías Calles	300	–	–
Sangre de Campeón	Tultitlán, State of Mexico	Cancha Nou Camp	1,000	–	–
Santos CDMX	Iztacalco, Mexico City	Deportivo Eduardo Molina	500	Santos Laguna	Novillos Neza

=== League table ===
Pos	Team	Pld	W	D	L	GF	GA	GD	Pts	Qualification
1	Aragón	36	31	4	1	122	28	+94	100	Advance to Liguilla de Ascenso
2	Chilangos	36	26	8	2	101	29	+72	91	Advance to Liguilla de Ascenso
3	Cuervos de Silver Soccer	36	24	5	7	81	32	+49	81	Advance to Liguilla de Ascenso
4	Álamos	36	22	8	6	75	46	+29	78	Advance to Liguilla de Ascenso
5	Muxes	36	23	5	8	74	34	+40	77	Advance to Liguilla de Ascenso
6	Club Carsaf	36	19	7	10	69	46	+23	66	Advance to Liguilla de Ascenso
7	Cuervos Blancos	36	16	12	8	67	53	+14	64	Advance to Liguilla de Ascenso
8	Sangre de Campeón	36	17	5	14	64	54	+10	59	Advance to Liguilla de Ascenso
9	R-Reyes	36	16	4	16	71	44	+27	55	
10	Loyalty	36	14	8	14	60	51	+9	54	
11	Azucareros de Tezonapa	36	15	3	18	62	74	−12	49	
12	Aztecas AMF Soccer	36	11	9	16	45	54	−9	47	
13	Politécnico	36	9	9	18	46	67	−21	42	
14	Marina	36	11	5	20	40	67	−27	38	
15	Atlético Estado de México	36	9	6	21	42	76	−34	36	
16	Panteras Neza	36	8	3	25	34	109	−75	30	
17	Halcones de Rayón	36	3	10	23	35	78	−43	22	
18	Santos CDMX	36	3	5	28	34	126	−92	19	
19	Oceanía	36	3	8	25	37	91	−54	18	
20	Promodep Central	0	0	0	0	0	0	0	0	Withdrew

Updated to match(es) played on 23 May 2021. Source: LigaTDP

== Group 5 ==
Location of teams in the 2020–21 Liga TDP Group 5

Group with 14 teams from Mexico City and State of Mexico.

=== Teams ===
Team	City	Home ground	Capacity	Affiliate	Official name
Atlético Chalquense	Chalco, State of Mexico	Arreola	2,500	–	–
Cantera CDMX	Huehuetoca, State of Mexico	12 de Mayo	1,500	–	Deportivo Talpa
Estudiantes de El Oro	El Oro de Hidalgo, State of Mexico	Jacinto Salinas "La Cabecilla"	500	–	–
Guerreros DDios	Xochimilco, Mexico City	San Isidro	1,000	–	–
C.D. Leones	Xonacatlán, State of Mexico	Gustavo A. Vicencio	2,000	–	Originales Aguacateros
Leones F.C. Amecameca	Amecameca, State of Mexico	Francisco Flores	3,000	–	–
Metepec	Metepec, State of Mexico	Unidad Deportiva Alarcón Hisojo	1,500	–	–
Mineros CDMX	Venustiano Carranza, Mexico City	Magdalena Mixhuca Sports City	500	–	Halcones Zúñiga
Proyecto México Soccer	Tenango del Valle, State of Mexico	Unidad Deportiva Alfredo del Mazo	1,000	–	Grupo Sherwood
Sime Soccer	San Antonio la Isla, State of Mexico	Unidad Deportiva San Antonio la Isla	1,000	–	CH Fútbol Club
Tenancingo	Tenancingo, State of Mexico	JM "Grillo" Cruzalta	3,000	–	Fuerza Mazahua F.C.
Toluca	Metepec, State of Mexico	Instalaciones de Metepec	1,000	Toluca	–
Villa Flor	Villa Guerrero, State of Mexico	Municipal de Villa Guerrero	1,500	–	–
Yalmakán	Iztapalapa, Mexico City	Deportivo Lázaro Cárdenas	1,000	–	–

=== League table ===
Pos	Team	Pld	W	D	L	GF	GA	GD	Pts	Qualification
1	Toluca	26	19	4	3	56	11	+45	64	Advance to Liguilla de Ascenso
2	Estudiantes	26	20	3	3	55	15	+40	63	Advance to Liguilla de Ascenso
3	Mineros CDMX	26	18	5	3	81	22	+59	61	Advance to Liguilla de Ascenso
4	Sime Soccer	26	17	5	4	60	13	+47	59	
5	Guerreros DDios	26	12	7	7	38	21	+17	48	
6	Tenancingo	26	11	6	9	47	31	+16	43	
7	C.D. Leones	26	12	4	10	52	37	+15	42	
8	Proyecto México Soccer	26	10	8	8	35	42	−7	42	
9	Metepec	26	7	6	13	30	47	−17	29	
10	Leones Amecameca	26	3	9	14	19	51	−32	23	
11	Villa Flor	26	6	3	17	32	59	−27	22	
12	Yalmakán	26	4	4	18	20	54	−34	19	
13	Cantera CDMX	26	5	3	18	27	80	−53	18	
14	Atlético Chalquense	26	3	3	20	20	89	−69	13	

Updated to match(es) played on 22 May 2021. Source: LigaTDP

== Group 6 ==
Group with 12 teams from Guerrero, Mexico City, Morelos, Puebla and State of Mexico.

=== Teams ===
Location of teams in the 2020–21 Liga TDP Group 6 (Mexico City, Morelos, Puebla and State of Mexico)
Location of teams in the 2020–21 Liga TDP Group 6 (Guerrero)

Team	City	Home ground	Capacity	Official name	Affiliate
Academia Cuextlán	Xochimilco, Mexico City	Deportivo Montesur	1,000	–	–
Águilas UAGro	Acapulco, Guerrero	Unidad Deportiva Acapulco	13,000	–	–
Caudillos de Morelos	Chiconcuac, Morelos	Unidad Deportiva Chiconcuac	1,000	–	–
Cefort Toros	Tezoyuca, Morelos	Unidad Deportiva Vidal Peralta	1,000	Santiago Tulantepec	–
Chilpancingo	Chilpancingo, Guerrero	David Josué García Evangelista	2,000	–	–
FORMAFUTINTEGRAL	Ixtapaluca, State of Mexico	Campo La Era	1,000	–	–
Guerreros de Puebla	Puebla City, Puebla	Centro Estatal del Deporte Mario Vázquez Raña	800	–	–
Iguanas	Zihuatanejo, Guerrero	Unidad Deportiva Zihuatanejo	1,000	–	–
Iguala	Iguala, Guerrero	Unidad Deportiva Iguala	4,000	–	–
Selva Cañera	Jojutla, Morelos	Unidad Deportiva La Perseverancia	1,000	–	–
Tigres Yautepec	Yautepec, Morelos	Centro Deportivo Yautepec	3,000	Atlético Cuernavaca	–
Yautepec	Yautepec, Morelos	Centro Deportivo Yautepec	3,000	–	–

=== League table ===
Pos	Team	Pld	W	D	L	GF	GA	GD	Pts	Qualification
1	Tigres Yautepec	22	16	4	2	45	20	+25	55	Advance to Liguilla de Ascenso
2	Águilas UAGro	22	16	1	5	59	20	+39	49	Advance to Liguilla de Ascenso
3	Academia Cuextlán	22	15	2	5	49	21	+28	47	Advance to Liguilla de Ascenso
4	Yautepec	22	15	2	5	50	29	+21	47	Advance to Liguilla de Ascenso
5	Chilpancingo	22	11	2	9	34	33	+1	35	Advance to Liguilla de Ascenso
6	Selva Cañera	22	7	6	9	24	28	−4	31	
7	Caudillos de Morelos	22	4	8	10	22	36	−14	26	
8	Iguala	22	7	3	12	32	39	−7	25	
9	Cefort Toros	22	6	4	12	23	38	−15	24	
10	Iguanas	22	7	1	14	26	46	−20	23	
11	FORMAFUTINTEGRAL	22	4	5	13	24	49	−25	18	
12	Guerreros Puebla	22	3	4	15	16	45	−29	16	

Updated to match(es) played on 22 May 2021. Source: LigaTDP

== Group 7 ==
Group with 16 teams from Hidalgo, Mexico City, Puebla, State of Mexico and Tlaxcala.

=== Teams ===
Location of teams in the 2020–21 Liga TDP Group 7 (Hidalgo)
Location of teams in the 2020–21 Liga TDP Group 7 (Puebla and Tlaxcala)
Location of teams in the 2020–21 Liga TDP Group 7 (State of Mexico)

Team	City	Home ground	Capacity	Affiliate	Official name
Bombarderos de Tecámac	Tecámac, State of Mexico	Deportivo Sierra Hermosa	1,000	–	–
CEFOR "Chaco" Giménez	Tulancingo, Hidalgo	Primero de Mayo	2,500	–	–
CEFOR Cuauhtémoc Blanco	Huauchinango, Puebla	Nido Águila Huauchinango	300	–	–
Ciervos	Chalco, State of Mexico	Arreola	2,500	Ciervos	–
Dongu	Cocotitlán, State of Mexico	Deportivo Cocotilán	1,000	Dongu	–
Faraones de Texcoco	Texcoco, State of Mexico	Claudio Suárez	4,000	–	–
Guerreros Aztecas	San Martín de las Pirámides, State of Mexico	Ing. Rubén Ramírez Ramírez	1,000	Alebrijes de Oaxaca	–
Guerreros de la Plata	Pachuca, Hidalgo	Deportivo Espartaco	1,000	–	–
Guerreros de Tlaxcala	Chiautempan, Tlaxcala	Unidad Deportiva Próspero Cahuantzi	2,500	–	–
Halcones Negros	Chicoloapan de Juárez, State of Mexico	Unidad Deportiva San José	1,000	–	–
Hidalguense	Pachuca, Hidalgo	Club Hidalguense	600	–	–
Independiente Mexiquense	Huehuetoca, State of Mexico	12 de Mayo	1,500	–	–
MARNAP	Ixmiquilpan, Hidalgo	Deportivo Marnap	1,000	–	–
Matamoros	Texcoco, State of Mexico	Unidad Deportiva Silverio Pérez	1,000	–	–
Sk Sport Street Soccer	Tulancingo, Hidalgo	Unidad Deportiva Javier Rojo Gómez	2,000	–	–
Tigres Tezontepec	Tezontepec, Hidalgo	3 de Noviembre	1,000	–	San José del Arenal
Universidad del Fútbol	San Agustín Tlaxiaca, Hidalgo	Universidad del Fútbol	1,000	Pachuca	–

=== League table ===
Pos	Team	Pld	W	D	L	GF	GA	GD	Pts	Qualification
1	Faraones de Texcoco	32	24	6	2	93	27	+66	82	Advance to Liguilla de Ascenso
2	Universidad del Fútbol	32	25	4	3	86	27	+59	82	Advance to Liguilla de No Ascenso
3	Cefor Cuauhtémoc Blanco	32	23	6	3	73	16	+57	77	Advance to Liguilla de Ascenso
4	Sk Sport Street Soccer	32	20	7	5	71	30	+41	72	Advance to Liguilla de Ascenso
5	Hidalguense	32	16	12	4	58	31	+27	70	Advance to Liguilla de Ascenso
6	Halcones Negros	32	19	10	3	74	30	+44	69	Advance to Liguilla de Ascenso
7	Bombarderos de Tecámac	32	12	5	15	44	47	−3	46	
8	Guerreros Aztecas	32	8	14	10	38	43	−5	44	
9	MARNAP	32	11	9	12	61	71	−10	43	
10	Cefor Chaco Giménez	32	11	6	15	60	81	−21	41	
11	Independiente Mexiquense	32	10	7	15	51	64	−13	40	
12	Guerreros de Tlaxcala	32	9	6	17	41	71	−30	37	
13	Guerreros de la Plata	32	10	5	17	54	65	−11	36	
14	Dongu	32	6	5	21	30	58	−28	26	
15	Matamoros	32	5	6	21	38	65	−27	21	
16	Tigres Tezontepec	32	5	3	24	39	109	−70	20	
17	Ciervos	32	0	5	27	22	98	−76	7	

Updated to match(es) played on 22 May 2021. Source: LigaTDP

== Group 8 ==
Group with 19 teams from Guanajuato, Jalisco, Michoacán and Querétaro. Note: Limsoccer F.C. was enrolled in the season, but was expelled after week 6 for failing to fulfill its obligations as an affiliate.

=== Teams ===
Location of teams in the 2020–21 Liga TDP Group 8 (Guanajuato)
Location of teams in the 2020–21 Liga TDP Group 8 (Querétaro)
Location of teams in the 2019–20 Liga TDP Group 8 (Jalisco and Michoacán)

Team	City	Home ground	Capacity	Affiliate	Official name
Aguacateros de Peribán	Peribán, Michoacán	Paricutín	2,000	–	–
Atlético IDEL	Querétaro, Querétaro	Unidad Deportiva Reforma Lomas	500	–	–
Cocodrilos Lázaro Cárdenas	Lázaro Cárdenas, Michoacán	Club Pacífico	2,500	–	–
Degollado	Degollado, Jalisco	Municipal de Degollado	2,000	La Piedad	–
Delfines de Abasolo	Abasolo, Guanajuato	Municipal de Abasolo	2,500	–	–
Estudiantes de Querétaro	Querétaro, Querétaro	Complejo Deportivo INDEREQ	1,000	–	–
Fuerza Naranja	Querétaro, Querétaro	Unidad Deportiva Reforma Lomas	500	–	–
Guerreros Zacapu	Zacapu, Michoacán	Municipal Zacapu	2,000	–	Monarcas Zacapu
Inter de Querétaro	Querétaro, Querétaro	Parque Bicentenario	1,000	Inter de Querétaro	Real Querétaro
Inter El Marqués	Querétaro, Querétaro	Unidad Deportiva La Cañada	2,000	Inter de Querétaro	Club Fundadores
Jaibos Cortazar	Cortazar, Guanajuato	Unidad Deportiva Sur	1,000	–	Deportivo Soria
La Piedad Querétaro	Querétaro, Querétaro	El Infiernillo	1,000	–	–
Lobos ITECA	Querétaro, Querétaro	Parque Bicentenario	1,000	–	–
Petroleros SJR	Bernal, Querétaro	Universidad CEICKOR	500	–	–
Soberano Zamora	Zamora, Michoacán	Unidad Deportiva El Chamizal	5,000	–	–
Strikers	Comonfort, Guanajuato	Circuito Deportivo Brígido Vargas	4,000	–	–
Titanes de Querétaro	Querétaro, Querétaro	Unidad Deportiva La Cañada	2,000	–	–
Yurécuaro	Yurécuaro, Michoacán	Unidad Deportiva Centenario	1,000	–	–

=== League table ===
Pos	Team	Pld	W	D	L	GF	GA	GD	Pts	Qualification
1	Degollado	34	23	7	4	76	27	+49	78	Advance to Liguilla de Ascenso
2	Titanes de Querétaro	34	22	6	6	69	26	+43	76	Advance to Liguilla de Ascenso
3	Aguacateros de Peribán	34	21	5	8	76	46	+30	72	Advance to Liguilla de Ascenso
4	Cocodrilos Lázaro Cárdenas	34	20	8	6	73	37	+36	70	Advance to Liguilla de Ascenso
5	Delfines de Abasolo	34	17	11	6	67	39	+28	68	Advance to Liguilla de Ascenso
6	Soberano Zamora	34	18	7	9	70	44	+26	65	Advance to Liguilla de Ascenso
7	Petroleros SJR	34	16	8	10	52	32	+20	62	Advance to Liguilla de Ascenso
8	Lobos ITECA	34	17	7	10	65	43	+22	60	Advance to Liguilla de Ascenso by coefficient
9	Inter de Querétaro	34	16	9	9	64	44	+20	60	
10	Estudiantes de Querétaro	34	14	9	11	39	39	0	53	
11	Yurécuaro	34	10	11	13	43	42	+1	49	
12	Fuerza Naranja	34	11	6	17	38	53	−15	42	
13	Jaibos Cortazar	34	10	7	17	50	58	−8	41	
14	Guerreros Zacapu	34	11	4	19	47	67	−20	39	
15	Atlético IDEL	34	11	3	20	44	64	−20	38	
16	Inter El Marqués	34	4	4	26	23	94	−71	19	
17	La Piedad Querétaro	34	3	3	28	24	94	−70	14	
18	Strikers	34	2	5	27	28	99	−71	12	

Updated to match(es) played on 22 May 2021. Source: LigaTDP

== Group 9 ==
Group with 13 teams from Aguascalientes, Durango, Guanajuato, Jalisco, Michoacán, San Luis Potosí and Zacatecas.

=== Teams ===
Location of teams in the 2020–21 Liga TDP Group 9 (Guanajuato and Jalisco)
Location of teams in the 2020–21 Liga TDP Group 9 (Aguascalientes and Zacatecas)
Location of teams in the 2020–21 Liga TDP Group 9 (Durango, Michoacán and San Luis Potosí)

Team	City	Home ground	Capacity	Affiliate	Official name
Alacranes de Durango	Durango, Durango	Francisco Zarco	18,000	Alacranes de Durango	–
Ates Morelia RC	Morelia, Michoacán	Canchas Furamo	500	–	Atlético Valladolid
Atlético ECCA	León, Guanajuato	CODE Las Joyas	1,000	–	–
Atlético Leonés	León, Guanajuato	CODE Las Joyas	1,000	–	–
Cachorros de León	León, Guanajuato	Unidad Deportiva Enrique Fernández Martínez	2,000	–	Fut-Car
Empresarios del Rincón	Purísima del Rincón, Guanajuato	Unidad Deportiva de Purísima	1,000	–	Real Olmeca Sport
Jerez	Jerez, Zacatecas	Ramón López Velarde	2,000	–	FC Zacatecas
Mineros de Fresnillo	Fresnillo, Zacatecas	Minera Fresnillo	6,000	Mineros de Fresnillo	–
Mineros de Zacatecas	Zacatecas, Zacatecas	Universitario Deportiva Guadalupe	1,000	Mineros de Zacatecas	–
Pabellón	Pabellón de Arteaga, Aguascalientes	Luis Guzmán	2,000	–	–
Somnus	Lagos de Moreno, Jalisco	Club Somnus	2,000	–	Real Magarí
Texcoco	Ciudad Valles, San Luis Potosí	Centro Cultural y Deportivo Ciudad Valles	1,000	–	–
Tuzos UAZ	Zacatecas, Zacatecas	Universitario Unidad Deportiva Norte	5,000	Tuzos UAZ	–

=== League table ===
Pos	Team	Pld	W	D	L	GF	GA	GD	Pts	Qualification
1	Mineros de Zacatecas	24	15	6	3	58	27	+31	55	Advance to Liguilla de No Ascenso
2	Tuzos UAZ	24	13	6	5	54	21	+33	47	Advance to Liguilla de Ascenso
3	Atlético Leonés	24	12	6	6	42	13	+29	46	Advance to Liguilla de Ascenso
4	Pabellón	24	13	5	6	42	16	+26	46	Advance to Liguilla de Ascenso
5	Jerez	24	12	5	7	42	27	+15	44	Advance to Liguilla de Ascenso
6	Cachorros de León	24	11	5	8	35	28	+7	40	
7	Ates Morelia RC	24	10	5	9	41	28	+13	38	
8	Mineros de Fresnillo	24	10	6	8	34	30	+4	38	
9	Somnus	24	8	6	10	39	35	+4	33	
10	Atlético ECCA	24	8	5	11	31	46	−15	31	
11	Texcoco	24	3	5	16	16	100	−84	17	
12	Alacranes de Durango	24	6	5	13	26	44	−18	25	
13	Empresarios del Rincón	24	1	3	20	11	56	−45	7	

Updated to match(es) played on 22 May 2021. Source: LigaTDP

== Group 10 ==
Group with 20 teams from Colima and Jalisco.

=== Teams ===
Location of teams in the 2020–21 Liga TDP Group 10

Team	City	Home ground	Capacity	Affiliate	Official name
Acatlán	Zapotlanejo, Jalisco	Miguel Hidalgo	1,500	–	–
Agaveros	Tlajomulco de Zúñiga, Jalisco	Campos Elite	1,000	–	–
Atlético Tecomán	Tecomán, Colima	Víctor Sevilla	4,000	–	–
Aves Blancas	Tepatitlán de Morelos, Jalisco	Corredor Industrial	1,200	–	–
Ayense	Ayotlán, Jalisco	Chino Rivas	4,000	–	–
CAFESSA	Tlajomulco de Zúñiga, Jalisco	Unidad Deportiva Mariano Otero	3,000	CAFESSA	–
Carfut Barajas Soccer	Tamazula de Gordiano, Jalisco	Deportivo Sección 80	1,000	–	Salamanca F.C.
Catedráticos Élite	Etzatlán, Jalisco	Unidad Deportiva Etzatlán	1,000	–	–
Charales de Chapala	Chapala, Jalisco	Municipal Juan Rayo	1,200	–	–
Diablos Tesistán	Zapopan, Jalisco	Club Diablos Tesistán	1,000	–	–
Gallos Viejos	Zapopan, Jalisco	Club Pumas Tesistán	1,000	–	–
Gorilas de Juanacatlán	Juanacatlán, Jalisco	Club Juanacatlán	500	–	–
Leones Negros UdeG	Zapopan, Jalisco	Club Deportivo U. de G.	3,000	Leones Negros UdeG	–
Nacional	Zapopan, Jalisco	Club Deportivo Imperio	500	–	–
Oro	Zapopan, Jalisco	Unidad Deportiva Revolución Mexicana	3,000	–	–
Picudos de Manzanillo	Zapopan, Jalisco	Club Vaqueros	1,000	–	–
Real Ánimas de Sayula	Sayula, Jalisco	Gustavo Díaz Ordaz	4,000	–	–
Tapatíos Soccer	Zapopan, Jalisco	Colegio Once México	3,000	–	–
Tepatitlán	Tepatitlán de Morelos, Jalisco	Gregorio "Tepa" Gómez	8,085	Tepatitlán	–
Tornados Tlaquepaque	Tlaquepaque, Jalisco	San Andrés	2,500	–	Atlético Cocula

=== League table ===
Pos	Team	Pld	W	D	L	GF	GA	GD	Pts	Qualification
1	CAFESSA	38	27	8	3	96	25	+71	92	Advance to Liguilla de Ascenso
2	Gorilas de Juanacatlán	38	26	7	5	94	37	+57	90	Advance to Liguilla de Ascenso
3	Diablos Tesistán	38	21	11	6	65	40	+25	80	Advance to Liguilla de Ascenso
4	Real Ánimas de Sayula	38	23	5	10	75	45	+30	76	Advance to Liguilla de Ascenso
5	Catedráticos Élite	38	20	10	8	67	40	+27	72	Advance to Liguilla de Ascenso
6	Tapatíos Soccer	38	17	12	9	77	46	+31	71	Advance to Liguilla de Ascenso
7	Aves Blancas	38	20	7	11	71	40	+31	70	Advance to Liguilla de Ascenso
8	Tepatitlán	38	19	8	11	77	53	+24	66	Advance to Liguilla de Ascenso
9	Charales de Chapala	38	16	11	11	59	43	+16	64	
10	Acatlán	38	17	9	12	56	41	+15	64	
11	Ayense	38	15	10	13	58	43	+15	61	
12	Leones Negros UdeG	38	16	7	15	50	47	+3	57	Advance to Liguilla de No Ascenso
13	Atlético Tecomán	38	10	13	15	51	53	−2	51	
14	Tornados Tlaquepaque	38	9	12	17	47	64	−17	51	
15	Agaveros	38	12	10	16	47	51	−4	49	
16	Gallos Viejos	38	10	9	19	49	80	−31	46	
17	Oro	38	8	12	18	52	59	−7	42	
18	Carfut Barajas Soccer	38	8	4	26	40	113	−73	29	
19	Picudos de Manzanillo	38	1	2	35	22	127	−105	6	
20	Nacional	38	1	1	36	15	121	−106	4	

Updated to match(es) played on 22 May 2021. Source: LigaTDP

== Group 11 ==
Group with 17 teams from Jalisco, Nayarit and Sinaloa.

=== Teams ===
Location of teams in the 2020–21 Liga TDP Group 11 (Jalisco and Nayarit)
Location of teams in the 2020–21 Liga TDP Group 11 (Sinaloa)

Team	City	Home ground	Capacity	Affiliate	Official name
Alcaldes de Lagos	Tlaquepaque, Jalisco	Club Vaqueros	1,000	–	–
Alteños Acatic	Acatic, Jalisco	Unidad Deportiva Acatic	1,000	Tepatitlán	–
Atlético Nayarit	Xalisco, Nayarit	Unidad Deportiva Landereñas	1,000	–	–
Caja Oblatos	Guadalajara, Jalisco	Unidad Deportiva Valentín Gómez Farías	1,360	–	–
Camaroneros de Escuinapa	San Martín de Hidalgo, Jalisco	Morelos Tepehuaje	1,000	–	–
CEFO–ALR	Ameca, Jalisco	Núcleo Deportivo y de Espectáculos Ameca	4,000	Tecos	–
CEFUT	Zapopan, Jalisco	Club Hacienda Real	1,000	–	–
Deportivo Cimagol	Tlaquepaque, Jalisco	Club Vaqueros Ixtlán	1,000	–	–
Deportivo Tala	Tala, Jalisco	Centro Deportivo y Cultural 24 de Marzo	3,000	–	Volcanes de Colima
Dorados de Sinaloa	Navolato, Sinaloa	Juventud	2,000	Dorados de Sinaloa	–
Fénix CFAR	Ahualulco de Mercado, Jalisco	Unidad Deportiva Hugo Sánchez	1,000	–	–
Mazorqueros	Ciudad Guzmán, Jalisco	Municipal Santa Rosa	3,500	Mazorqueros	–
Puerto Vallarta	Puerto Vallarta, Jalisco	Municipal Agustín Flores Contreras	3,000	–	–
RC–1128	Ocotlán, Jalisco	Municipal Benito Juárez	1,500	–	–
River Plate Escuela Jalisco	Tlajomulco de Zúñiga, Jalisco	Cancha Pumitas	1,000	River Plate	–
Tecos	Zapopan, Jalisco	Tres de Marzo	18,779	Tecos	–
Xalisco	Xalisco, Nayarit	Unidad Deportiva AFEN	2,000	–	–

=== League table ===
Pos	Team	Pld	W	D	L	GF	GA	GD	Pts	Qualification
1	Dorados de Sinaloa	32	21	8	3	77	27	+50	74	Advance to Liguilla de No Ascenso
2	Xalisco	32	19	9	4	74	42	+32	72	Advance to Liguilla de Ascenso
3	Deportivo Tala	32	22	2	8	100	45	+55	69	Advance to Liguilla de Ascenso
4	RC–1128	32	20	5	7	74	38	+36	65	Advance to Liguilla de Ascenso
5	Mazorqueros	32	18	7	7	77	29	+48	64	Advance to Liguilla de Ascenso
6	CEFUT	32	16	9	7	71	41	+30	64	Advance to Liguilla de Ascenso by coefficient
7	Tecos	32	17	8	7	71	41	+30	62	Advance to Liguilla de No Ascenso
8	Puerto Vallarta	32	14	8	10	63	52	+11	56	
9	River Plate Escuela Jalisco	32	13	9	10	55	51	+4	51	Advance to Liguilla de No Ascenso
10	Alteños Acatic	32	11	7	14	61	72	−11	46	Advance to Liguilla de No Ascenso
11	Caja Oblatos	32	10	9	13	49	61	−12	42	
12	Atlético Nayarit	32	8	9	15	45	53	−8	38	Advance to Liguilla de No Ascenso
13	CEFO–ALR	32	8	6	18	41	60	−19	34	
14	Alcaldes de Lagos	32	10	2	20	30	77	−47	32	
15	Fénix CFAR	32	6	6	20	41	76	−35	26	
16	Deportivo Cimagol	32	3	2	27	17	99	−82	11	
17	Camaroneros de Escuinapa	32	2	2	28	16	98	−82	10	

Updated to match(es) played on 16 May 2021. Source: LigaTDP

== Group 12 ==
Group with 8 teams from Coahuila, Nuevo León and Tamaulipas.

=== Teams ===
Location of teams in the 2020–21 Liga TDP Group 12 (Nuevo León and Tamaulipas)
Location of teams in the 2020–21 Liga TDP Group 12 (Coahuila)

Team	City	Home ground	Capacity	Affiliate	Official name
Bravos de Nuevo Laredo	Nuevo Laredo, Tamaulipas	Unidad Deportiva Benito Juárez	5,000	–	–
Cadereyta	Cadereyta Jiménez, Nuevo León	Alfonso Martínez Domínguez	1,000	–	–
FCD Bulls Santiago	Santiago, Nuevo León	FCD El Barrial	570	FC Dallas	–
Imperio Real San Cosme	Monterrey, Nuevo León	Ciudad Deportiva Churubusco	1,000	–	–
Irritilas	San Pedro, Coahuila	Quinta Ximena	1,000	–	–
Jabatos Nuevo León	Cadereyta Jiménez, Nuevo León	Clemente Salinas Netro	1,000	–	Bucaneros de Matamoros
Regios Azul y Oro	Monterrey, Nuevo León	Ciudad Deportiva Churubusco	1,000	–	Querétaro 3D Monterrey
Saltillo Soccer	Saltillo, Coahuila	Olímpico Francisco I. Madero	7,000	Saltillo	–

=== League table ===
Pos	Team	Pld	W	D	L	GF	GA	GD	Pts	Qualification
1	Saltillo Soccer	21	18	2	1	55	8	+47	58	Advance to Liguilla de Ascenso
2	FCD Bulls Santiago	21	11	7	3	48	19	+29	42	Advance to Liguilla de Ascenso
3	Bravos de Nuevo Laredo	21	11	4	6	32	21	+11	39	Advance to Liguilla de Ascenso
4	Irritilas	21	12	1	8	36	22	+14	38	Advance to Liguilla de Ascenso by coefficient
5	Jabatos Nuevo León	21	9	5	7	35	31	+4	33	
6	Cadereyta	21	5	5	11	25	39	−14	23	
7	Imperio Real San Cosme	21	2	3	16	16	59	−43	10	
8	Regios Azul y Oro	21	1	3	17	7	55	−48	7	

Updated to match(es) played on 22 May 2021. Source: LigaTDP

== Group 13 ==
Group with 8 teams from Chihuahua and Sonora.

=== Teams ===
Location of teams in the 2020–21 Liga TDP Group 13

Team	City	Home ground	Capacity	Affiliate	Official name
Cimarrones de Sonora	Hermosillo, Sonora	Héroe de Nacozari	18,747	Cimarrones de Sonora	–
Cobras Fut Premier	Ciudad Juárez, Chihuahua	20 de Noviembre	2,500	–	–
CEPROFFA	Ciudad Juárez, Chihuahua	CEPROFFA	1,000	–	–
Etchojoa	Etchojoa, Sonora	María Lourdes Leyva Mendoza	1,000	–	–
Guaymas	Guaymas, Sonora	Unidad Deportiva Julio Alfonso	3,000	–	–
Huatabampo	Huatabampo, Sonora	Unidad Deportiva Baldomero "Melo" Almada	3,000	–	–
La Tribu de Ciudad Juárez	Ciudad Juárez, Chihuahua	20 de Noviembre	2,500	–	–
Xolos Hermosillo	Hermosillo, Sonora	Miguel Castro Servín	4,000	Tijuana	–

=== League table ===
Pos	Team	Pld	W	D	L	GF	GA	GD	Pts	Qualification
1	La Tribu de Ciudad Juárez	28	13	11	4	46	24	+22	54	Advance to Liguilla de Ascenso
2	Huatabampo	28	12	11	5	47	36	+11	52	Advance to Liguilla de No Ascenso
3	Cimarrones de Sonora	28	15	5	8	52	29	+23	50	Advance to Liguilla de No Ascenso
4	Etchojoa	28	12	9	7	58	37	+21	50	Advance to Liguilla de Ascenso
5	Guaymas	28	8	9	11	40	44	−4	39	Advance to Liguilla de Ascenso
6	CEPROFFA	28	9	6	13	37	51	−14	36	
7	Xolos Hermosillo	28	8	5	15	33	50	−17	34	Advance to Liguilla de No Ascenso
8	Cobras Fut Premier	28	5	4	19	31	73	−42	21	

Updated to match(es) played on 22 May 2021. Source: LigaTDP

== Group 14 ==
Group with 7 teams from Baja California. Although this group was officially announced by the League, no match was ever played between its members. The three places that belonged to this group in the play-offs were awarded to the three clubs with the best coefficient in the North Zone and who could not qualify through their own group.

=== Teams ===
Location of teams in the 2020–21 Liga TDP Group 14

Team	City	Home ground	Capacity	Affiliate
40 Grados MXL	Mexicali, Baja California	Parque Deportivo Necaxa	1,000	–
Atlético Juniors	Tijuana, Baja California	Unidad Deportiva CREA	10,000	–
Cachanillas	Mexicali, Baja California	Club Necaxa	1,000	–
Dragones	Tijuana, Baja California	Unidad Deportiva CREA	10,000	–
Gladiadores Tijuana	Tijuana, Baja California	Unidad Deportiva CREA	10,000	–
London	Tijuana, Baja California	Unidad Deportiva CREA	10,000	–
Rosarito	Rosarito Beach, Baja California	Andrés Luna	2,000	–

=== League table ===
Pos	Team	Pld	W	D	L	GF	GA	GD	Pts
1	40 Grados MXL	0	0	0	0	0	0	0	0
2	Atlético Juniors	0	0	0	0	0	0	0	0
3	Cachanillas	0	0	0	0	0	0	0	0
4	Dragones	0	0	0	0	0	0	0	0
5	Gladiadores Tijuana	0	0	0	0	0	0	0	0
6	London	0	0	0	0	0	0	0	0
7	Rosarito	0	0	0	0	0	0	0	0

Updated to match(es) played on unknown. Source: LigaTDP

== Promotion Play–offs ==
The Promotion Play–offs will consist of seven phases. Classify 64 teams, the number varies according to the number of teams in each group, being between three and eight clubs per group. The country will be divided into two zones: South Zone (Groups I to VII) and North Zone (Groups VIII to XIII). Eliminations will be held according to the average obtained by each team, being ordered from best to worst by their percentage throughout the season.

As of this season, the names of the knockout stages were modified as follows: Round of 32, Round of 16, Quarter-finals, Semifinals, Zone Final and Final, this as a consequence of the division of the country into two zones, for so the teams only face clubs from the same region until the final series.

=== Round of 32 ===
The first legs were played on 26 and 27 May, and the second legs were played on 29 and 30 May 2021.

==== South Zone ====
Team 1	Agg.	Team 2	1st leg	2nd leg
Aragón	7–2	Chilpancingo	4–1	3–1
Faraones de Texcoco	6–0	Sangre de Campeón	1–0	5–0
Chilangos	6–3	Corsarios de Campeche	2–2	4–1
Tigres Yautepec	4–3	Inter Playa del Carmen	2–1	2–2
Toluca	7–2	Cuervos Blancos	5–2	2–0
Estudiantes	1–2	CARSAF	0–1	1–1
CEFOR Cuauhtémoc Blanco	1–3	Deportiva Venados	1–3	0–0
Tuxpan	3–0	Porteños	1–0	2–0
Mineros CDMX	3–4	Petroleros de Poza Rica	1–3	2–1
Fuertes de Fortín	(p.) 0–0 (4–3)	Lechuzas UPGCH	0–0	0–0
Cruz Azul Lagunas	1–3	Delfines UGM	0–1	1–2
Cuervos de Silver Soccer	3–3 (3–4) (p.)	Papanes de Papantla	3–3	0–0
Sk Sport Street Soccer	3–2	Yautepec	1–1	2–1
Águilas UAGro	3–1	Academia Cuextlán	0–1	3–0
Hidalguense	1–1 (4–5) (p.)	Muxes	1–1	0–0
Álamos	2–6	Halcones Negros	2–3	0–3

==== North Zone ====
Team 1	Agg.	Team 2	1st leg	2nd leg
Saltillo Soccer	4–1	Guaymas	3–0	1–1
CAFESSA	8–1	Tepatitlán	7–0	1–1
Gorilas de Juanacatlán	6–2	Lobos ITECA	3–0	3–2
Degollado	1–6	Etchojoa	0–3	1–3
Xalisco	3–3 (1–3) (p.)	Irritilas	3–2	0–1
Titanes de Querétaro	2–3	Petroleros SJR	1–1	1–2
Deportivo Tala	5–4	Jerez	0–4	5–0
Aguacateros de Peribán	4–1	Aves Blancas	1–1	3–0
Diablos Tesistán	2–0	Bravos de Nuevo Laredo	0–0	2–0
Cocodrilos Lázaro Cárdenas	3–3 (2–4) (p.)	Tapatíos Soccer	2–1	1–2
RC-1128	(p.) 1–1 (5–3)	Catedráticos Elite	0–0	1–1
Mazorqueros	5–4	Soberano Zamora	2–1	3–3
Real Ánimas de Sayula	(p.) 2–2 (4–2)	Pabellón	2–0	0–2
CEFUT	5–4	Atlético Leonés	2–3	3–1
FCD Bulls Santiago	1–1 (1–4) (p.)	La Tribu de Ciudad Juárez	0–1	1–0
Delfines de Abasolo	(p.) 2–2 (4–2)	Tuzos UAZ	0–1	2–1

=== Round of 16 ===
The first legs were played on 2 and 3 June, and the second legs were played on 5 and 6 June 2021.

==== South Zone ====
Team 1	Agg.	Team 2	1st leg	2nd leg
Aragón	8–0	CARSAF	4–0	4–0
Faraones de Texcoco	(p.) 3–3 (4–2)	Deportiva Venados	0–2	3–1
Chilangos	(p.) 3–3 (4–1)	Petroleros de Poza Rica	1–1	2–2
Tigres Yautepec	3–2	Delfines UGM	0–1	3–1
Toluca	5–2	Papanes de Papantla	0–2	5–0
Tuxpan	2–0	Muxes	1–0	1–0
Fuertes de Fortín	1–0	Halcones Negros	1–0	0–0
Sk Sport Street Soccer	2–0	Águilas UAGro	0–0	2–0

==== North Zone ====
Team 1	Agg.	Team 2	1st leg	2nd leg
Saltillo Soccer	1–2	Etchojoa	0–1	1–1
CAFESSA	2–0	Irritilas	0–0	2–0
Gorilas de Juanacatlán	4–3	Petroleros SJR	1–1	3–2
Deportivo Tala	(p.) 1–1 (3–2)	Tapatíos Soccer	0–0	1–1
Aguacateros de Peribán	2–5	La Tribu de Ciudad Juárez	0–3	2–2
Diablos Tesistán	2–2 (1–4) (p.)	Delfines de Abasolo	0–0	2–2
RC-1128	4–2	CEFUT	1–1	3–1
Mazorqueros	3–2	Real Ánimas de Sayula	2–1	1–1

=== Final stage ===
Zone Quarter–finals
1	Tigres Yautepec	0	3	3 (4)
16	Toluca (p.)	3	0	3 (5)
8	Chilangos	1	0	1
9	Tuxpan	2	1	3
5	Aragón (p.)	1	0	1 (3)
12	Sk Sport Street Soccer	0	1	1 (1)
4	Faraones de Texcoco	0	0	0
13	Fuertes de Fortín	2	0	2
6	CAFESSA	0	3	3
11	Etchojoa	2	0	2
3	Gorilas de Juanacatlán	1	1	2
14	La Tribu de Ciudad Juárez	2	2	4
7	RC-1128	0	3	3
10	Mazorqueros	1	0	1
2	Deportivo Tala	0	4	4
15	Delfines de Abasolo	5	2	7

Zone Semi–finals
Toluca (p.)	0	2	2 (10)
Tuxpan	2	0	2 (9)
Aragón	0	2	2 (4)
Fuertes de Fortín (p.)	2	0	2 (5)
CAFESSA (p.)	0	1	1 (4)
La Tribu de Ciudad Juárez	0	1	1 (3)
RC-1128 (p.)	0	2	2 (3)
Delfines de Abasolo	1	1	2 (1)

Zone Finals
Toluca	1	1	2
Fuertes de Fortín	2	1	3
CAFESSA	2	2	4
RC-1128	4	1	5

League Final
Fuertes de Fortín (p.)	0 (6)
RC-1128	0 (5)

==== Zone Quarter–finals ====
The first legs were played on 9 and 10 June, and the second legs were played on 12 and 13 June 2021.

Team 1	Agg.	Team 2	1st leg	2nd leg
Aragón	(p.) 1–1 (3–1)	Sk Sport Street Soccer	1–0	0–1
Faraones de Texcoco	0–2	Fuertes de Fortín	2–0	0–0
Chilangos	1–3	Tuxpan	1–2	0–1
Tigres Yautepec	3–3 (4–5) (p.)	Toluca	0–3	3–0
CAFESSA	3–2	Etchojoa	0–2	3–0
Gorilas de Juanacatlán	2–4	La Tribu de Ciudad Juárez	1–2	1–2
Deportivo Tala	4–7	Delfines de Abasolo	0–5	4–2
RC-1128	3–1	Mazorqueros	0–1	3–0

===== First leg =====
9 June 2021	Toluca	3–0	Tigres Yautepec	Metepec, State of Mexico
10:00 CDT (UTC−5)	Guerrero 46', 81'; Cervantes 65'	Report		Stadium: Instalaciones de Metepec; Attendance: 0 Referee: Kevin Peñaloza Flores

9 June 2021	Sk Sport Street Soccer	0–1	Aragón	Tulancingo, Hidalgo
12:00 CDT (UTC−5)		Report	Valdéz 63'	Stadium: Unidad Deportiva Javier Rojo Gómez; Attendance: 200; Referee: Alfredo Huerta López

9 June 2021	Etchojoa	2–0	CAFESSA	Etchojoa, Sonora
15:00 MST (UTC−7)	López 50'; Hernández 79'	Report		Stadium: Estadio María Lourdes Leyva Mendoza; Attendance: 500; Referee: Iván Alberto Salazar Hernández

9 June 2021	Tuxpan	2–1	Chilangos	Tuxpan, Veracruz
16:30 CDT (UTC−5)	Martínez 2'; Delgado 75'	Report	Ávalos 56'	Stadium: Estadio Álvaro Lorenzo Fernández; Attendance: 1,000; Referee: René Paul Moreno López

9 June 2021	Mazorqueros	1–0	RC-1128	Ciudad Guzmán, Jalisco
19:00 CDT (UTC−5)	Rodríguez 86'	Report		Stadium: Estadio Municipal Santa Rosa; Attendance: 3,500; Referee: Diego Gilberto Gurrea Mendoza

10 June 2021	La Tribu de Ciudad Juárez	2–1	Gorilas de Juanacatlán	Ciudad Juárez, Chihuahua
14:00 MDT (UTC−6)	Jiménez 38'; Vázquez 90' (o.g.)	Report	Osorio 23'	Stadium: Complejo CEPROFFA; Attendance: 100; Referee: Jesús Enrique Herrera Armenta

10 June 2021	Fuertes de Fortín	2–0	Faraones de Texcoco	Fortín de las Flores, Veracruz
15:00 CDT (UTC−5)	Villa 10', 52'	Report		Stadium: Unidad Deportiva Eliezer Morales; Attendance: 1,000; Referee: Edson Enrique Castañón Ramírez

10 June 2021	Delfines de Abasolo	5–0	Deportivo Tala	Abasolo, Guanajuato
16:00 CDT (UTC−5)	Martínez 23'; Arellano 41'; Torres 57'; Morales 79'; Venegas 87' (o.g.)	Report		Stadium: Estadio Municipal de Abasolo; Attendance: 1,100; Referee: Yair Ugalde Rivera

===== Second leg =====
12 June 2021	Chilangos	0–1 (1–3 agg.)	Tuxpan	Mexico City
12:00 CDT (UTC−5)		Report	Martínez 66'	Stadium: Centro Deportivo Benito Juárez; Attendance: 100; Referee: José Maximiliano Negrete Preciado

12 June 2021	Aragón	0–1 (1–1 agg.) (3–1 p)	Sk Sport Street Soccer	Mexico City
12:30 CDT (UTC−5)		Report	López 62'	Stadium: Deportivo Plutarco Elías Calles; Attendance: 70; Referee: Luis Alfredo Calvillo Lira

12 June 2021	RC-1128	3–0 (3–1 agg.)	Mazorqueros	Ocotlán, Jalisco
17:00 CDT (UTC−5)	Magallón 13'; Campos 15' (o.g.); Medina 50'	Report		Stadium: Estadio Municipal Benito Juárez; Attendance: 500; Referee: Rosario Guadalupe Cárdenas Morales

12 June 2021	Tigres Yautepec	3–0 (3–3 agg.) (4–5 p)	Toluca	Yautepec, Morelos
18:00 CDT (UTC−5)	García 18'; Peña 21'; Franco 79'	Report		Stadium: Centro Deportivo Yautepec; Attendance: 800; Referee: Brian Jair Jiménez Morales

12 June 2021	CAFESSA	3–0 (3–2 agg.)	Etchojoa	Tlajomulco, Jalisco
19:00 CDT (UTC−5)	Padilla 5'; Cervantes 49'; Martínez 63'	Report		Stadium: Unidad Deportiva Mariano Otero; Attendance: 300; Referee: Erwin Urick Chávez De La Rosa

13 June 2021	Deportivo Tala	4–2 (4–7 agg.)	Delfines de Abasolo	Tala, Jalisco
12:00 CDT (UTC−5)	Camarena 42'; Sigala 48'; Ulloa 49', 61'	Report	Arellano 1'; Martínez 44'	Stadium: Centro Deportivo y Cultural 24 de Marzo; Attendance: 1,800; Referee: Emmanuel Plascencia Plascencia

13 June 2021	Faraones de Texcoco	0–0 (0–2 agg.)	Fuertes de Fortín	Texcoco, State of Mexico
16:00 CDT (UTC−5)		Report		Stadium: Estadio Municipal Claudio Suárez; Attendance: 700; Referee: Jhovanny Ulises Osornio Sánchez

13 June 2021	Gorilas de Juanacatlán	1–2 (2–4 agg.)	La Tribu de Ciudad Juárez	Juanacatlán, Jalisco
18:00 CDT (UTC−5)	Higareda 90' (pen.)	Report	Cota 62'; Martínez 84'	Stadium: Club Juanacatlán; Attendance: 600; Referee: Eduardo Fernando Hudlet Fernández

==== Zone Semi–finals ====
The first legs were played on 16 June, and the second legs were played on 19 June 2021.

Team 1	Agg.	Team 2	1st leg	2nd leg
Aragón	2–2 (4–5) (p.)	Fuertes de Fortín	0–2	2–0
Toluca	(p.) 2–2 (10–9)	Tuxpan	0–2	2–0
CAFESSA	(p.) 1–1 (4–3)	La Tribu de Ciudad Juárez	0–0	1–1
RC-1128	(p.) 2–2 (3–1)	Delfines de Abasolo	0–1	2–1

===== First leg =====
16 June 2021	La Tribu de Ciudad Juárez	0–0	CAFESSA	Ciudad Juárez, Chihuahua
14:00 MDT (UTC−6)		Report		Stadium: Complejo CEPROFFA; Attendance: 100; Referee: Jesús Enrique Herrera Armenta

16 June 2021	Fuertes de Fortín	2–0	Aragón	Fortín de las Flores, Veracruz
15:00 CDT (UTC−5)	Carrera 5'; Osorio 17'	Report		Stadium: Unidad Deportiva Eliezer Morales; Attendance: 1,000; Referee: Yair Ugalde Rivera

16 June 2021	Delfines de Abasolo	1–0	RC-1128	Abasolo, Guanajuato
16:00 CDT (UTC−5)	Medel 32'	Report		Stadium: Estadio Municipal de Abasolo; Attendance: 2,500; Referee: Diego Gilberto Gurrea Mendoza

16 June 2021	Tuxpan	2–0	Toluca	Tuxpan, Veracruz
16:30 CDT (UTC−5)	Martínez 7'; Maya 46'	Report		Stadium: Estadio Álvaro Lorenzo Fernández; Attendance: 3,500; Referee: Yahir Sebastián Cabrera Morales

===== Second leg =====
19 June 2021	Toluca	2–0 (2–2 agg.) (10–9 p)	Tuxpan	Metepec, State of Mexico
10:00 CDT (UTC−5)	Medina 22'; Hernández 37' (o.g.)	Report		Stadium: Instalaciones de Metepec; Attendance: 0 Referee: Erick González Miranda

19 June 2021	Aragón	2–0 (2–2 agg.) (4–5 p)	Fuertes de Fortín	Mexico City
12:30 CDT (UTC−5)	López 64'; Alba 83'	Report		Stadium: Deportivo Plutarco Elías Calles; Attendance: 500; Referee: Rosario Guadalupe Cárdenas Morales

19 June 2021	RC-1128	2–1 (2–2 agg.) (3–1 p)	Delfines de Abasolo	Ocotlán, Jalisco
17:00 CDT (UTC−5)	Alcalá 30'; Chávez 76'	Report	Martínez 67'	Stadium: Estadio Municipal Benito Juárez; Attendance: 1,000; Referee: Erwin Urick Chávez De La Rosa

19 June 2021	CAFESSA	1–1 (1–1 agg.) (4–3 p)	La Tribu de Ciudad Juárez	Tlajomulco, Jalisco
19:00 CDT (UTC−5)	Rodríguez 3'	Report	Cota 46'	Stadium: Unidad Deportiva Mariano Otero; Attendance: 800; Referee: Brian Jair Jiménez Morales

==== Zone Finals ====
The first legs were played on 23 and 24 June, and the second legs were played on 26 and 27 June 2021.

Team 1	Agg.	Team 2	1st leg	2nd leg
Toluca	2–3	Fuertes de Fortín	1–2	1–1
CAFESSA	4–5	RC-1128	2–4	2–1

===== First leg =====
23 June 2021	Fuertes de Fortín	2–1	Toluca	Fortín de las Flores, Veracruz
15:00 CDT (UTC−5)	Contreras 23'; Villa 61' (pen.)	Report	Guerrero 38'	Stadium: Unidad Deportiva Eliezer Morales; Attendance: 1,500; Referee: Erick González Miranda

24 June 2021	RC-1128	4–2	CAFESSA	Ocotlán, Jalisco
17:00 CDT (UTC−5)	Magallón 31', 90'; León 76'; Sandoval 82'	Report	Cervantes 57'; Durán 84'	Stadium: Estadio Municipal Benito Juárez; Attendance: 1,198; Referee: Jesús Enrique Herrera Armenta

===== Second leg =====
26 June 2021	Toluca	1–1 (1–2 agg.)	Fuertes de Fortín	Toluca, State of Mexico
12:00 CDT (UTC−5)	De la Cruz 26'	Report	Villa 47'	Stadium: Estadio Nemesio Díez; Attendance: 3,000; Referee: Yair Ugalde Rivera

27 June 2021	CAFESSA	2–1 (4–5 agg.)	RC-1128	Guadalajara, Jalisco
11:00 CDT (UTC−5)	García 14'; Franco 56'	Report	Barrientos 73'	Stadium: Estadio Jalisco; Attendance: 1,200; Referee: Rosario Guadalupe Cárdenas Morales

==== League Final ====
The match was played on 3 July 2021.

Team 1	Score	Team 2
Fuertes de Fortín	(p.) 0–0 (6–5)	RC–1128

3 July 2021	Fuertes de Fortín	0–0 (6–5 p)	RC-1128	Mexico City
11:00 CDT (UTC−5)		Report		Stadium: Estadio Azteca; Attendance: 1,000; Referee: Yair Ugalde Rivera
	Penalties
	Villa (penalty scored); Carrera (penalty scored); Cruz (penalty scored); Castillo (penalty scored); Cortés (penalty missed); Arano (penalty scored); Valdivia (penalty missed); González (penalty scored)		Magallón (penalty scored); Barrientos (penalty scored); López (penalty scored); Chávez (penalty scored); Sandoval (penalty missed); O. Medina (penalty scored); I. Medina (penalty missed); Alcalá (penalty missed)

2020–21 winners

1st title

== Reserve and Development Teams ==
Each season a table is created among those teams that don't have the right to promote, because they are considered as reserve teams for teams that play in Liga MX, Liga de Expansión and Liga Premier or are independent teams that have requested not to participate for the Promotion due to the fact that they are footballers development projects. The ranking order is determined through the "quotient", which is obtained by dividing the points obtained between the disputed matches, being ordered from highest to lowest.

=== Table ===
P	Team	Pts	G	Pts/G	GD
1	Universidad del Fútbol	82	32	2.56	+59
2	Dorados de Sinaloa	74	32	2.31	+50
3	Mineros de Zacatecas	55	24	2.29	+31
4	Cancún	40	20	2.00	+6
5	Tecos	62	32	1.94	+30
6	Huatabampo	52	28	1.86	+11
7	Cimarrones de Sonora	50	28	1.79	+23
8	Alebrijes de Oaxaca	45	27	1.67	+5
9	River Plate Escuela Jalisco	51	32	1.59	+4
10	Leones Negros UdeG	57	38	1.50	+3
11	Tulum	30	20	1.50	–4
12	Venados	29	20	1.45	–2
13	Alteños Acatic	46	32	1.44	–11
14	Zaragoza	36	28	1.29	–11
15	Xolos Hermosillo	34	28	1.21	–17
16	Atlético Nayarit	38	32	1.19	–8
17	Guerreros de Tlaxcala	38	32	1.19	–30
18	CEFO-ALR	34	32	1.06	–19
19	Alacranes de Durango	25	24	1.04	–18
20	Leones Amecameca	23	26	0.88	–32
21	Villa Flor	22	26	0.85	–27
22	Dongu	27	32	0.84	–28
23	Cantera CDMX	18	26	0.69	–53
24	Atlético Chalquense	13	26	0.50	–69
25	La Piedad Querétaro	14	34	0.41	–70
26	Ciervos	7	32	0.22	–76

Last updated: May 22, 2021
Source: Liga TDP
P = Position; G = Games played; Pts = Points; Pts/G = Ratio of points to games played; GD = Goal difference

=== Play–offs ===
Round of 16
2	Dorados de Sinaloa	0	1	1
15	Xolos Hermosillo	0	0	0
8	Alebrijes de Oaxaca	1	0	1
9	River Plate Escuela Jalisco	2	0	2
4	Cancún	2	5	7
13	Alteños Acatic	0	2	2
5	Tecos	1	2	3
12	Cantera Venados	1	1	2
1	Universidad del Fútbol	2	5	7
16	Atlético Nayarit	2	0	2
6	Huatabampo	0	2	2 (3)
11	Tulum (p.)	1	1	2 (4)
3	Mineros de Zacatecas	2	7	9
14	Zaragoza	1	0	1
7	Cimarrones de Sonora	3	1	4
10	Leones Negros UdeG	3	0	3

Quarter–finals
2	Dorados de Sinaloa (p.)	1	1	2 (4)
9	River Plate Escuela Jalisco	2	0	2 (3)
4	Cancún	1	2	3
5	Tecos	0	1	1
1	Universidad del Fútbol	0	3	3
11	Tulum	0	0	0
3	Mineros de Zacatecas	0	0	0
7	Cimarrones de Sonora	1	0	1

Semi–finals
2	Dorados de Sinaloa (p.)	1	1	2 (6)
4	Cancún	1	1	2 (5)
1	Universidad del Fútbol	0	2	2 (3)
7	Cimarrones de Sonora (p.)	1	1	2 (4)

Final
2	Dorados de Sinaloa	0	1	1
7	Cimarrones de Sonora	0	0	0

==== Round of 16 ====
The first legs were played on 26 May, and the second legs were played on 29 May 2021.

Team 1	Agg.	Team 2	1st leg	2nd leg
Universidad del Fútbol	7–2	Atlético Nayarit	2–2	5–0
Alebrijes de Oaxaca	1–2	River Plate Escuela Jalisco	1–2	0–0
Cancún	7–2	Alteños Acatic	2–0	5–2
Tecos	3–2	Cantera Venados	1–1	2–1
Dorados de Sinaloa	1–0	Xolos Hermosillo	0–0	1–0
Cimarrones de Sonora	4–3	Leones Negros UdeG	3–3	1–0
Mineros de Zacatecas	9–1	Zaragoza	2–1	7–0
Huatabampo	2–2 (3–4) (p.)	Tulum	0–1	2–1

===== First leg =====
26 May 2021	Leones Negros UdeG	3–3	Cimarrones de Sonora	Zapopan, Jalisco
10:00 CDT (UTC−5)	Zepeda 39', 45'; Mata 47'	Report	Enríquez 41', 75'; Rivera 49'	Stadium: Club Deportivo La Primavera; Attendance: 30; Referee: Ricardo Joseph Zárate Balderas

26 May 2021	River Plate Escuela Jalisco	2–1	Alebrijes de Oaxaca	Tonalá, Jalisco
10:00 CDT (UTC−5)	Zarate 77'; Escobar 88' (own)	Report	Pérez 15'	Stadium: Unidad Deportiva Revolución Mexicana; Attendance: 200; Referee: Salvador Rivera Martínez

26 May 2021	Zaragoza	1–2	Mineros de Zacatecas	Puebla City, Puebla
11:00 CDT (UTC−5)	Huerta 68'	Report	Rodarte 63'; Vázquez 83'	Stadium: Unidad Deportiva Mario Vázquez Raña; Attendance: 0 Referee: Yahir Sebastián Cabrera Morales

26 May 2021	Atlético Nayarit	2–2	Universidad del Fútbol	Xalisco, Nayarit
15:00 MDT (UTC−6)	Delgado 18'; Navarrete 57'	Report	Carrera 9'; Bautista 51'	Stadium: Unidad Deportiva Landereñas; Attendance: 200; Referee: Emmanuel Plascencia Plascencia

26 May 2021	Xolos Hermosillo	0–0	Dorados de Sinaloa	Hermosillo, Sonora
15:00 MST (UTC−7)		Report		Stadium: Campo de Fútbol La Milla UNISON; Attendance: 0 Referee: Sammy Ojendiz Benítez

26 May 2021	Cantera Venados	1–1	Tecos	Mérida, Yucatán
16:30 CDT (UTC−5)	Amador 16'	Report	Casillas 63'	Stadium: Estadio Carlos Iturralde; Attendance: 0 Referee: Adrián Jhonatan del Ángel Olán

26 May 2021	Tulum	1–0	Huatabampo	Tulum, Quintana Roo
18:00 EST (UTC−5)	Acosta 68'	Report		Stadium: Estadio Héctor Díaz de la Peña; Attendance: 0 Referee: Berny Abigail Concha Vázquez

26 May 2021	Alteños Acatic	0–2	Cancún	Acatic, Jalisco
19:00 CDT (UTC−5)		Report	Toledo 68'; Ricardez 78'	Stadium: Unidad Deportiva de Acatic; Attendance: 100; Referee: Marco Claudio Rodríguez Deras

===== Second leg =====
29 May 2021	Universidad del Fútbol	5–0 (7–2 agg.)	Atlético Nayarit	San Agustín Tlaxiaca, Hidalgo
10:00 CDT (UTC−5)	Lagos 7'; Bautista 13', 74'; Madrigal 24' (own); Peña 90'	Report		Stadium: Universidad del Fútbol; Attendance: 60; Referee: Gerardo Yahir Mendoza Sánchez

29 May 2021	Dorados de Sinaloa	1–0 (1–0 agg.)	Xolos Hermosillo	Culiacán, Sinaloa
10:00 MDT (UTC−6)	Herrera 69'	Report		Stadium: Estadio Dorados; Attendance: 70; Referee: Luis Manuel Miramontes Rosales

29 May 2021	Cimarrones de Sonora	1–0 (4–3 agg.)	Leones Negros UdeG	Hermosillo, Sonora
10:00 MST (UTC−7)	Silva 2'	Report		Stadium: Estadio Héroe de Nacozari; Attendance: 300; Referee: Javier De Jesús Ramos Hernández

29 May 2021	Cancún	5–2 (7–2 agg.)	Alteños Acatic	Cancún, Quintana Roo
11:00 EST (UTC−5)	Carpio 21'; Nieto 36'; Ortega 46'; Toledo 67'; López 80'	Report	Hernández 27'; Gutiérrez 32'	Stadium: CEDAR Cancún; Attendance: 0 Referee: José Nicolás López Vázquez

29 May 2021	Mineros de Zacatecas	7–0 (9–1 agg.)	Zaragoza	Guadalupe, Zacatecas
11:00 CDT (UTC−5)	Amador 21', 29'; Piñón 34'; Rivera 50' (own); Martínez 65'; González 68'; Sotelo 70'	Report		Stadium: Unidad Deportiva Guadalupe; Attendance: 0 Referee: Jorge Alfonso Resendiz Espinoza

29 May 2021	Tecos	2–1 (1–0 agg.)	Cantera Venados	Zapopan, Jalisco
11:00 CDT (UTC−5)	Torres 17'; Santiago 79'	Report	Lara 58'	Stadium: Estadio Tres de Marzo; Attendance: 0 Referee: Emmanuel Juan Jesús Zaleta Garatachia

29 May 2021	Alebrijes de Oaxaca	0–0 (1–2 agg.)	River Plate Escuela Jalisco	Oaxaca City, Oaxaca
15:45 CDT (UTC−5)		Report		Stadium: Estadio Instituto Tecnológico de Oaxaca; Attendance: 0 Referee: Jimmy Acosta Pérez

29 May 2021	Huatabampo	2–1 (2–2 agg.) (3–4 p)	Tulum	Huatabampo, Sonora
18:00 MST (UTC−7)	Rosas 69'; Ozuna 86'	Report	Carmona 45'	Stadium: Unidad Deportiva Baldomero Melo Almada; Attendance: 200; Referee: Rodrigo Ramos Romo

==== Quarter–finals ====
The first legs were played on 2 June, and the second legs were played on 5 June 2021.

Team 1	Agg.	Team 2	1st leg	2nd leg
Universidad del Fútbol	3–0	Tulum	0–0	3–0
Dorados de Sinaloa	(p.) 2–2 (4–3)	River Plate Escuela Jalisco	1–2	1–0
Mineros de Zacatecas	0–1	Cimarrones de Sonora	0–1	0–0
Cancún	3–1	Tecos	1–0	2–1

===== First leg =====
2 June 2021	River Plate Escuela Jalisco	2–1	Dorados de Sinaloa	Tonalá, Jalisco
10:00 CDT (UTC−5)	Padilla 26', 45'	Report	Salas 40'	Stadium: Unidad Deportiva Revolución Mexicana; Attendance: 150; Referee: José Maximiliano Negrete Preciado

2 June 2021	Cimarrones de Sonora	1–0	Mineros de Zacatecas	Hermosillo, Sonora
10:00 MST (UTC−7)	Rivera 28'	Report		Stadium: Estadio Héroe de Nacozari; Attendance: 100; Referee: Javier De Jesús Ramos Hernández

2 June 2021	Tecos	0–1	Cancún	Zapopan, Jalisco
11:00 CDT (UTC−5)		Report	Nieto 22'	Stadium: Estadio Tres de Marzo; Attendance: 50; Referee: Ricardo Joseph Zárate Balderas

2 June 2021	Tulum	0–0	Universidad del Fútbol	Tulum, Quintana Roo
17:00 EST (UTC−5)		Report		Stadium: Estadio Héctor Díaz de la Peña; Attendance: 0 Referee: Luis Enrique Menéndez Meléndez

===== Second leg =====
5 June 2021	Universidad del Fútbol	3–0 (3–0 agg.)	Tulum	San Agustín Tlaxiaca, Hidalgo
10:00 CDT (UTC−5)	Bautista 14', 57'; Corona 55'	Report		Stadium: Universidad del Fútbol; Attendance: 0 Referee: Kevin Peñaloza Flores

5 June 2021	Dorados de Sinaloa	1–0 (2–2 agg.) (4–3 p)	River Plate Escuela Jalisco	Culiacán, Sinaloa
10:00 MDT (UTC−6)	Herrera 45'	Report		Stadium: Estadio Dorados; Attendance: 0 Referee: David Fernando Gutiérrez Zamora

5 June 2021	Mineros de Zacatecas	0–0 (0–1 agg.)	Cimarrones de Sonora	Guadalupe, Zacatecas
11:00 CDT (UTC−5)		Report		Stadium: Unidad Deportiva Guadalupe; Attendance: 0 Referee: David Fernando Gutiérrez Zamora

5 June 2021	Cancún	2–1 (3–1 agg.)	Tecos	Cancún, Quintana Roo
11:00 EST (UTC−5)	Wojdyla 5'; Alamilla 54'	Report	Castellanos 22'	Stadium: CEDAR Cancún; Attendance: 0 Referee: Adrián Jhonatan del Ángel Olán

==== Semi-finals ====
The first legs were played on 9 and 10 June, and the second legs were played on 12 and 13 June 2021.

Team 1	Agg.	Team 2	1st leg	2nd leg
Universidad del Fútbol	2–2 (3-4) (p.)	Cimarrones de Sonora	0–1	2–1
Dorados de Sinaloa	(p.) 2–2 (6-5)	Cancún	1–1	1–1

===== First leg =====
9 June 2021	Dorados de Sinaloa	1–1	Cancún	Culiacán, Sinaloa
10:00 MDT (UTC−6)	Salas 49'	Report	Carpio 35'	Stadium: Estadio Dorados; Attendance: 300; Referee: Erick González Miranda

10 June 2021	Cimarrones de Sonora	1–0	Universidad del Fútbol	Hermosillo, Sonora
10:00 MST (UTC−7)	Enríquez 1'	Report		Stadium: Estadio Héroe de Nacozari; Attendance: 190; Referee: Rodrigo Ramos Romo

===== Second leg =====
12 June 2021	Cancún	1–1 (2–2 agg.) (5–6 p)	Dorados de Sinaloa	Cancún, Quintana Roo
11:00 EST (UTC−5)	Toledo 90'	Report	Herrera 41'	Stadium: CEDAR Cancún; Attendance: 0 Referee: Yahir Sebastián Cabrera Morales

13 June 2021	Universidad del Fútbol	2–1 (2–2 agg.) (3–4 p)	Cimarrones de Sonora	San Agustín Tlaxiaca, Hidalgo
10:00 CDT (UTC−5)	González 54'; Bautista 59'	Report	Murillo 90'	Stadium: Universidad del Fútbol; Attendance: 200; Referee: Héctor Morales Leal

==== Final ====
The first leg was played on 17 June, and the second leg was played on 20 June 2021.

Team 1	Agg.	Team 2	1st leg	2nd leg
Dorados de Sinaloa	1–0	Cimarrones de Sonora	0–0	1–0

===== First leg =====
17 June 2021	Cimarrones de Sonora	0–0	Dorados de Sinaloa	Hermosillo, Sonora
19:00 MST (UTC−7)		Report		Stadium: Estadio Héroe de Nacozari; Attendance: 1,000; Referee: Rodrigo Ramos Romo

===== Second leg =====
20 June 2021	Dorados de Sinaloa	1–0 (1–0 agg.)	Cimarrones de Sonora	Culiacán, Sinaloa
18:00 MDT (UTC−6)	López 79'	Report		Stadium: Estadio Dorados; Attendance: 1,200; Referee: Luis Alfredo Calvillo Lira

2020–21 No promotion winners

1st title

== Regular season statistics ==
=== Top goalscorers ===
Players sorted first by goals scored, then by last name.

Rank	Player	Club	Goals
1	(Mexico) Ricardo Alba	Aragón	41
2	(Mexico) Enrique Ávalos	Chilangos	39
3	(Mexico) Daniel Axel Rodríguez	Azucareros de Tezonapa	30
4	(Mexico) Erick Carballo	Lechuzas UPGCH	28
5	(Mexico) Ehécatl Sigala	Deportivo Tala	26
6	(Mexico) Víctor Manuel Díaz	Cefor Chiapas	24
7	(Mexico) José Antonio Gachuz	MARNAP	23
7	(Mexico) Luis Miguel Higareda	Gorilas de Juanacatlán	23
9	(Mexico) Maximiliano Flores	Álamos	22
9	(Mexico) César Gutiérrez	Xalisco	22
9	(Mexico) Daniel Valencia	Aguacateros de Peribán	22

Source:Liga TDP
