= Ramiro Romero =

Mexican footballer and manager (born 1970)

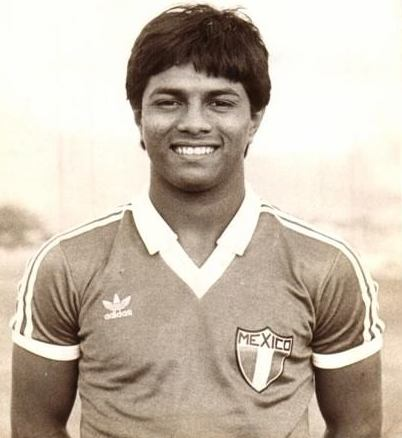

Personal information
- Full name: Ramiro Romero Ortíz
- Date of birth: 26 January 1970 (age 56)
- Place of birth: Tuxpan, Mexico
- Height: 1.65 m (5 ft 5 in)
- Position: Forward

Senior career*
Years	Team	Apps	(Gls)
1988–1994	Cruz Azul		
1994–1995	UAT		
1995–1998	Toros Neza		

International career
1987	Mexico U17	2	(1)

Managerial career
- 2010: Inter Playa del Carmen
- 2017–2018: Cocodrilos FC
- 2018–2019: Albinegros de Orizaba (assistant)
- 2019–2021: Tuxpan
Medal record
Men's football
Representing Mexico
Pan American Games
Silver medal – second place	1991 Havana	Team
- * Club domestic league appearances and goals

Ramiro Romero Ortíz (born 26 January 1970) is a retired Mexican footballer and manager. He played for Cruz Azul, UAT and Toros Neza. As an international player, he was part of the Mexican squad at the 1987 FIFA U-16 World Championship and the 1991 Pan American Games, where he won the silver medal.

He last managed Tuxpan of the Liga TDP, the fourth level of the Mexican football league system.

== Club career ==
Ramiro Romero was born in Tuxpan, Mexico on 26 January 1970. He made his professional debut with Cruz Azul in the 1988–89 season, playing 23 games and scoring two goals.

He would also play for Correcaminos UAT from 1994 to 1995, and Toros Neza from 1995 to 1998.

== International career ==
Romero was part of Mexico's squad at the 1987 FIFA U-16 World Championship, where he played two matches and scored one goal, against Bolivia.

He also participated in the 1991 Pan American Games, where the Mexican team won the silver medal.

== Managerial career ==
Romero started his managerial career with Inter Playa del Carmen in 2010. After that, he managed third division club Cocodrilos F.C. Lázaro Cárdenas with a record of 23 wins, 4 draws and 7 losses.

In 2018, he joined Albinegros de Orizaba as an assistant for Carlos Reinoso Jr.
