= Club RC–1128 =

Mexican football club

- Full name: Club RC Morales 1128 Sport
- Founded: August 2020; 6 years ago
- Dissolved: 26 July 2021; 5 years ago
- Ground: Estadio Municipal Benito Juárez; Ocotlán, Jalisco
- Capacity: 1,500
- Owner(s): Ramón Morales; Carlos Adrián Morales; Carlos Salcido
- League: Tercera División de México – Group XI
- 2020–21: 4th – Group XI (National runner–up)
Home colours	Away colours

Club RC Morales 1128 Sport, also known as Club RC–1128, was a Mexican football club that played in the Tercera División de México, the bottom level division of Mexican football. It was based in Ocotlán, Jalisco.

== History ==
The club was founded in August 2020 as a professional team for footballers of a soccer academy belonging to the brothers Ramón and Carlos Adrián Morales, which is also supported by Carlos Salcido, so the name of the club comes from the initials and numbers used by the Morales brothers in their time as professional footballers.

The team finished its first season in fourth place in Group 11, and thus entered the promotion play-offs. In the early stages, the club eliminated Catedráticos Élite, CEFUT and Mazorqueros to reach the zone semifinals. In this phase, the team eliminated Delfines de Abasolo in a penalty shoot-out, in this way, the club achieved its promotion to the Segunda División de México. On June 27, the team was crowned champion of North Zone of the Liga TDP after defeating Deportivo CAFESSA Tlajomulco by an aggregate score of 4–5, with this the club secured its place in the Serie A.

On July 26, 2021, the team was merged with Catedráticos Élite and took the identity of this club, so it was relocated in Ameca, Jalisco. After this merger, RC–1128 ceased to exist as such, since it was not registered in the new season of the Tercera División de México.

== Stadium ==
The team played its home games at the Estadio Municipal Benito Juárez de Ocotlán, which has a capacity for 1,500 spectators. Originally, the team started playing at the Complejo Deportivo Salcido, however, in May 2021 it moved from the stadium.
