= C.F. Zaragoza =

Mexican football club

Zaragoza
- Full name: Club de Fútbol Zaragoza
- Founded: 2019; 7 years ago
- Dissolved: July 2020; 6 years ago
- Ground: Unidad Deportiva Mario Vázquez Raña; Puebla, Puebla
- Capacity: 800
- Manager: Pedro Pineda
- League: Liga TDP
- 2020–21: 10th – Group II (round of 16 no promotion teams)
Home colours	Away colours

C.F. Zaragoza, commonly known as Zaragoza, was a Mexican football club based in the city of Puebla, Puebla, which competed in the Tercera División de México, the bottom division level of Mexican football.

== History ==
=== First season and COVID-19 ===
The club was founded in 2019 and started in the Tercera División de México, which is Mexico's bottom division football level. The club was placed in group 2 made up of teams from southeastern Mexico. Fernando Martínez Aldana served as the club's first manager and went on to lose its first game 5–0 to Club Deportivo Poza Rica. Due to the COVID-19 pandemic, the league was suspended and the 2019–2020 tournament was eventually cancelled.

=== Liga de Balompié Mexicano ===
In late 2020, the club was rumored to join the newly created Liga de Balompié Mexicano as one of its founding members. In June of that same year, the club announced a merger with the intention of creating a football team in the state of Tabasco. This merger eventually fell through when the local government brought in an affiliated team from the Primera División de México, top team Club Universidad Nacional. Due to the failed merger, the club returned to an individual team bid, this time having a verbal agreement with the local government of Teziutlán in the state of Puebla. In July 2020, it was announced that the club would play home games in the Estadio Municipal de Teziutlán, a stadium with a capacity of 7,000 spectators. However, the offer was not accepted by the new league. Eventually, the team competed in the Tercera División de México for the 2020–21 season.

=== Current roster ===
Note: Flags indicate national team as defined under FIFA eligibility rules; some limited exceptions apply. Players may hold more than one non-FIFA nationality.

No.	Pos.	Nation	Player
