= Tuxpan F.C. =

Mexican football club

- Full name: Tuxpan Fútbol Club
- Nickname(s): Conejos (Rabbits)
- Founded: 2007
- Ground: Estadio Álvaro Lorenzo Fernández; Tuxpan, Veracruz
- Capacity: 5,000
- Manager: Ramiro Romero
- League: Tercera División de México – Group II
- 2020–21: 1st – Group II (Semi–finals)
Home colours	Away colours

Tuxpan Fútbol Club is a Mexican football club that plays in the Tercera División de México. The club is based in Tuxpan, Veracruz. In 2019, the club was refounded and renamed as Tuxpan F.C.. It is a rival of C.D. Poza Rica.

== Stadium ==
The team plays its home games at the Estadio Álvaro Lorenzo Fernández, which has a capacity to accommodate 5,000 spectators.

== Players ==
=== First-team squad ===
As of 17 June 2021

Note: Flags indicate national team as defined under FIFA eligibility rules; some limited exceptions apply. Players may hold more than one non-FIFA nationality.

No.	Pos.	Nation	Player
1	GK	(Mexico) MEX	Lothar López
2	DF	(Mexico) MEX	Alonso Hernández
3	DF	(Mexico) MEX	Jared Santos
4	DF	(Mexico) MEX	Pablo Santiago
5	DF	(Mexico) MEX	Aldair Cruz
6	DF	(Mexico) MEX	Jesús Romero
7	MF	(Mexico) MEX	José García
8	FW	(Mexico) MEX	Gibran Sotero
9	FW	(Mexico) MEX	Armando Maya
10	MF	(Mexico) MEX	Brian Torres
11	FW	(Mexico) MEX	José Martínez
12	FW	(Mexico) MEX	Luis Cruz
13	MF	(Mexico) MEX	Marcos Perdomo
14	DF	(Mexico) MEX	Hernando Benítez

No.	Pos.	Nation	Player
16	MF	(Mexico) MEX	Alan Fernández
17	MF	(Mexico) MEX	Eduardo Gómez
19	DF	(Mexico) MEX	Brandon Mercado
20	DF	(Mexico) MEX	Miguel Escalante
22	DF	(Mexico) MEX	Kevin del Ángel
21	GK	(Mexico) MEX	Oscar Santiago
23	DF	(Mexico) MEX	Alan López
24	FW	(Mexico) MEX	Daniel Santos
25	DF	(Mexico) MEX	Bryan García
26	FW	(Mexico) MEX	Luis Soto
27	GK	(Mexico) MEX	Edwin Juárez
28	MF	(Mexico) MEX	Juan Castillo
29	DF	(Mexico) MEX	Jesús González
30	MF	(Mexico) MEX	José Delgado

== See also ==
- Football in Mexico
- Veracruz
