= Fuertes de Fortín F.C. =

- Full name: Fuertes de Fortín Fútbol Club
- Nickname: Los Fuertes (The strong ones)
- Founded: August 2019; 7 years ago
- Dissolved: 22 July 2021; 5 years ago
- Ground: Unidad Deportiva Eliezer Morales; Fortín de las Flores, Veracruz
- Capacity: 2,000
- Chairman: Héctor Ruíz
- League: Tercera División de México – Group II
- 2020–21: 2nd – Group II (National Champions)
Home colours	Away colours

Fuertes de Fortín Fútbol Club was a Mexican football club based in Fortín de las Flores, Veracruz that competed in the Tercera División de México, the bottom division level of Mexican football.

== History ==
The team was founded in August 2019 to return professional football to the town after more than 20 years without having a representative club of the town. For regulatory reasons, during the first season the club competed under the name Club Santos Córdoba, a franchise whose registration was used for the birth of the Fuertes.

In 2020, the club got its own registration in the Federación Mexicana de Fútbol (FMF), so it was officially able to compete under the real name of the team. The club finished in second place in their group and therefore entered the promotion phase. In the promotion phase, the club eliminated the teams Lechuzas UPGCH, Halcones Negros and Faraones de Texcoco to reach the Zone Semifinals against Aragón F.C., on June 19, 2021, the team achieved their promotion to the Segunda División de México after defeating the capital's team in the penalty shootout by 4–5, after drawing 2–2 on the aggregate scoreboard. On June 26, 2021, the team won the South Zone championship after defeating Toluca by 2–3 in the aggregate. Following this result, the team secured a place in the Liga Premier - Serie A.

On July 3, 2021, the team won the national championship of the Tercera División de México by defeating Club RC–1128 by 6–5 in the penalty shootout, this after drawing at zero goals during the regular period of the match, the game was held at the Estadio Azteca in Mexico City.

In July 2021 the team was sold to businessmen from Orizaba, who relocated it to their city and was renamed Montañeses F.C. After that, Fuertes de Fortín was dissolved since it was not registered in the new season of the Tercera División.

== Stadium ==
Fuertes de Fortín played their home games at the Unidad Deportiva Eliezer Morales, a sports complex located in Fortín de las Flores, Veracruz. The soccer field has a capacity to host 2,000 spectators.

== Honors ==
- Tercera División de México (1):2020–2021
