= Atlético Aragón =

- Full name: Club Atlético Aragón
- Founded: August 2016; 10 years ago
- Ground: Deportivo Francisco Zarco, Mexico City
- Capacity: 1,000
- Chairman: Juan Carlos Moreno Audiffred
- Manager: Juan Pablo García
- League: Liga Premier - Serie A
- Clausura 2025: 12th – Group III
Home colours	Away colours

Atlético Aragón, also known as Atlético San Juan de Aragón, is a Mexican football club that plays in the Liga TDP, is located in Mexico City.

== History ==
The team was founded in 2016, from that year it began to compete in the Liga TDP, but using the registration of a team called Azules de la Sección 26 situation that would remain until 2018. In 2018, the team changed its registration and began to use that of the Atlético San Juan de Aragón, which it has maintained since that year.

In the 2020–2021 season the team became the best club during the regular season of the TDP League, scoring 100 points during the 36 games of their group.

In the promotion stage, Aragón eliminated C.D. Chilpancingo, Club Carsaf and Sk Sport Street Soccer, until reaching the regional semifinals, where they were eliminated by Fuertes de Fortín F.C.

In July 2021 the team was invited to participate in the Liga Premier Serie B because it achieved the best records in the Liga TDP regular season, finally, on July 30, its entry into the league was made official.

On August 2, 2021, Ricardo Alba debuted in Liga MX with Atlético San Luis, making him the first player trained in this club to reach the highest category of Mexican soccer. On August 8, 2021, the team announced that it will not participate in the Serie B season for administrative reasons, so the team will continue to participate only in the Liga TDP.

In the 2022–23 season, the team achieved its sports promotion to the Liga Premier, after eliminating Atlético Pachuca, Guerreros DD, Inter Playa del Carmen and Estudiantes de Atlacomulco. For the 2023–24 season, the team was relocated to Cuautitlán, State of Mexico, with the Estadio Municipal Los Pinos as its new ground.

In June 2025 the main team of Atlético Aragón was merged with Toros Neza. With the agreement, Neza took Aragón's place in the Liga Premier – Serie A. However, Aragón maintained professional participation through its farm team participating in the Liga TDP.
