= Reales de Puebla =

- Full name: Reales de Puebla Futbol Club
- Nickname(s): Reales
- Founded: 2006; 19 years ago
- Ground: Unidad Deportiva Chachapa; Chachapa, Puebla, Mexico
- Capacity: 1,000
- Chairman: Abel Nava
- Manager: Adolfo Torrentera
- League: Liga TDP - Group III
- 2020–21: 12th – Group II
Home colours	Away colours

Reales de Puebla Futbol Club is a Mexican football club that plays in the Liga TDP. The club is based in Puebla, Puebla.

== History ==
The club was founded in 2006 by Abel Nava along with xavier Aquino Limón and an ex Candide to the municipal presidency José Amador Tejeda Carbajal. These men made up the directors' board who stated that they planned on having a club in the 4th and second division via promotion or by buying a franchise. The club currently plays in group 4 of the Tercera División de México.

== See also ==
- Football in Mexico
