= Deportivo CAFESSA Jalisco =

Mexican football club

CAFESSA Jalisco
- Full name: Deportivo CAFESSA Jalisco
- Founded: 2015; 11 years ago
- Dissolved: June 2021; 5 years ago
- Ground: Estadio Jalisco; Guadalajara, Jalisco
- Capacity: 55,110
Home colours	Away colours

Deportivo CAFESSA Jalisco, commonly known as CAFESSA Jalisco, was a Mexican football club based in Guadalajara, Jalisco. The club was founded in 2015, and played in the Liga Premier - Serie A, the third division level of Mexican football, until it was dissolved in June 2021.

== History ==
Deportivo CAFESSA was founded in 2015 from a Tercera División franchise called Cazcanes de Ameca, during its first season it kept the original name. In 2016 it took its current name.

During its first two seasons, the team stayed in Ameca, Jalisco having as its ground the Núcleo Deportivo y de Espectáculos Ameca. In 2017, an agreement was reached with the municipality of Tlajomulco to relocate the team to that city.

Before starting the 2017-18 season, it was announced that Deportivo CAFESSA acquired an expansion franchise in the Liga Premier - Serie B, the fourth professional category in Mexican soccer, at the same time, a reserve team was created to compete in the Tercera División.

From the 2019-20 season, Deportivo CAFESSA created a new team which was transferred to the Estadio Jalisco located in Guadalajara, Jalisco, and began playing in the Liga Premier – Serie A. The team was able to move from the stadium, after signing an agreement with Club Jalisco, club that holds partial ownership of the stadium, for this agreement, the club was renamed as Deportivo CAFESSA Jalisco. However, the club maintained Serie B (until 2020) and Liga TDP teams with the name CAFESSA Tlajomulco.

In June 2021, the owner of CAFESSA Jalisco put the franchise on hiatus due to the lack of guarantees for a possible future category promotion after the rejection of Club Irapuato in the Liga de Expansión MX, in 2022 the franchise was not reactivated, so when the one-year period without activity expired, the club was dissolved.

== Players ==
=== Current squad ===
As of January 31, 2021

=== Reserve teams ===
Deportivo CAFESSA Tlajomulco
Reserve team that plays in the Liga TDP, the bottom level of the Mexican league system.

== See also ==
- Deportivo CAFESSA Tlajomulco
