= C.D. Aves Blancas =

- Full name: Club Deportivo Aves Blancas de Jalisco A.C.
- Nickname: Aves Blancas
- Founded: 11 March 2000; 26 years ago
- Ground: Estadio Corredor Industrial; Tepatitlán, Jalisco, Mexico
- Capacity: 1,200
- Owner: A.C. AB de Jalisco
- Manager: César Octavio López
- League: Liga TDP – Group XII
- 2020–21: 7th – Group X (round of 32)
| Home colours | Away colours |

Club Deportivo Aves Blancas de Jalisco, A.C. is a football club that plays in the Liga TDP. It is based in the city of Tepatitlán, Mexico.

== History ==
The team was founded on 11 March 2000, the same year it was enrolled in the Tercera División de México. Unlike other clubs, they have never tried to participate in a higher category.

In the 2015–16 season, the team reached the semifinals of the category after eliminating CDU Uruapan, Constructores de Gómez Palacio, Monarcas Morelia and Tecos, to finally be eliminated by the Leones Negros UdeG second reserve team. In the 2019–2020 season, the club temporarily paused its activity, to return to compete in the following season.

== Stadium ==
The Estadio Corredor Industrial is a stadium located in Tepatitlán, Jalisco, Mexico. It has a capacity for 1,200 spectators and can reach a capacity of 5,000 in case of expansion work.

== Rivalry ==
The club has a rivalry with Tepatitlán F.C., however, because the main teams both clubs dispute different categories, Aves Blancas must play the matches against the reserve team of Tepa, the match is known as Clásico Alteño or Clásico de Tepatitlán.

== Players ==
=== First-team squad ===
As of 6 October 2020

Note: Flags indicate national team as defined under FIFA eligibility rules; some limited exceptions apply. Players may hold more than one non-FIFA nationality.

| No. | Pos. | Nation | Player |
|---|---|---|---|
| 1 | GK | MEX | Daniel Muñoz |
| 2 | DF | MEX | Diego Aceves |
| 3 | DF | MEX | Alberto Camarena |
| 4 | DF | MEX | José Vázquez |
| 6 | MF | MEX | Alan Hernández |
| 7 | FW | MEX | Omar Íñiguez |
| 8 | MF | MEX | Gerardo Valadez |
| 9 | FW | MEX | Alberto García |
| 10 | MF | MEX | Diego Gutiérrez |
| 11 | FW | MEX | Juan Ramírez |
| 12 | GK | MEX | Marcos Segovia |
| 13 | FW | MEX | Edgar Navarro |

| No. | Pos. | Nation | Player |
|---|---|---|---|
| 14 | MF | MEX | Eduardo Valdivia |
| 15 | DF | MEX | Jesús Guerra |
| 16 | MF | MEX | Edwin Martín |
| 17 | FW | MEX | Diego Gutiérrez |
| 18 | DF | MEX | Sergio Vargas |
| 19 | MF | MEX | César Colin |
| 20 | FW | MEX | Andrés González |
| 21 | DF | MEX | Pablo Esqueda |
| 22 | DF | MEX | Ángel Vera |
| 23 | MF | MEX | Víctor Catalán |
| 24 | DF | MEX | Pedro Herrera |
| 25 | FW | MEX | Juan López |
