= Cocodrilos F.C. Lázaro Cárdenas =

- Full name: Cocodrilos Fútbol Club Lázaro Cárdenas
- Nickname: Cocodrilos (Crocodiles)
- Founded: August 2017; 9 years ago
- Dissolved: August 2021; 5 years ago
- Ground: Club Pacífico; Lázaro Cárdenas, Michoacán, Mexico
- Capacity: 2,500
- Chairman: Vacant
- Manager: Vacant
- League: Tercera División de México – Group VII
- 2020–21: 4th – Group VIII (Round of 32)
Home colours	Away colours

Cocodrilos Fútbol Club Lázaro Cárdenas was a football club that played in the Third Division. It was based in the city of Lázaro Cárdenas, Mexico.

== History ==
The club was founded in August 2017 and from that year began to participate in the Liga TDP. The team officially debuted on September 2, defeating Monarcas Zacapu 3–0. Alexis Casas scored the first goal in the club's history. The team has reached the promotion playoffs in its three full seasons, falling all times in the round of 32.

In August 2021 Eleazar Molina Segura, who was the president and owner of the club, died, so the team went on hiatus for the 2021–22 season due to financial difficulties provoked by the death of its owner. In 2022 the club's hiatus period expired, for which it was dissolved when it did not resume its activity.

== Stadium ==
The club played its home games at the Estadio Deportivo Club Pacífico, located in Lázaro Cárdenas, currently has a capacity for 2,500 spectators. However, in 2020 the stadium expansion process began, which aims to expand its capacity to 12,000 seats by 2022 in a first phase, however, it was expected to reach 25,000 seats within 10 years. Finally, the project was canceled with the dissolution of the club.

== See also ==
- Football in Mexico
- Tercera División de México
