= Azucareros de Tezonapa =

- Full name: Atlético Boca del Río
- Nickname(s): Azucareros
- Founded: 2004
- Ground: Estadio Hugo Sánchez Márquez; Cuautitlán Izcalli, State of Mexico, Mexico
- Capacity: 3,500
- Chairman: Jose Salomón Aguilar
- Manager: Raúl Islas
- League: Tercera División de México
- 2020–21: 11th – Group IV
Home colours	Away colours	Third colours

Azucareros de Tezonapa is a Mexican football club that plays in the Liga TDP. The club is based in Tezonapa, Veracruz, Mexico. The club takes its name from the city's history of sugar production.
