= Álamos F.C. =

Álamos
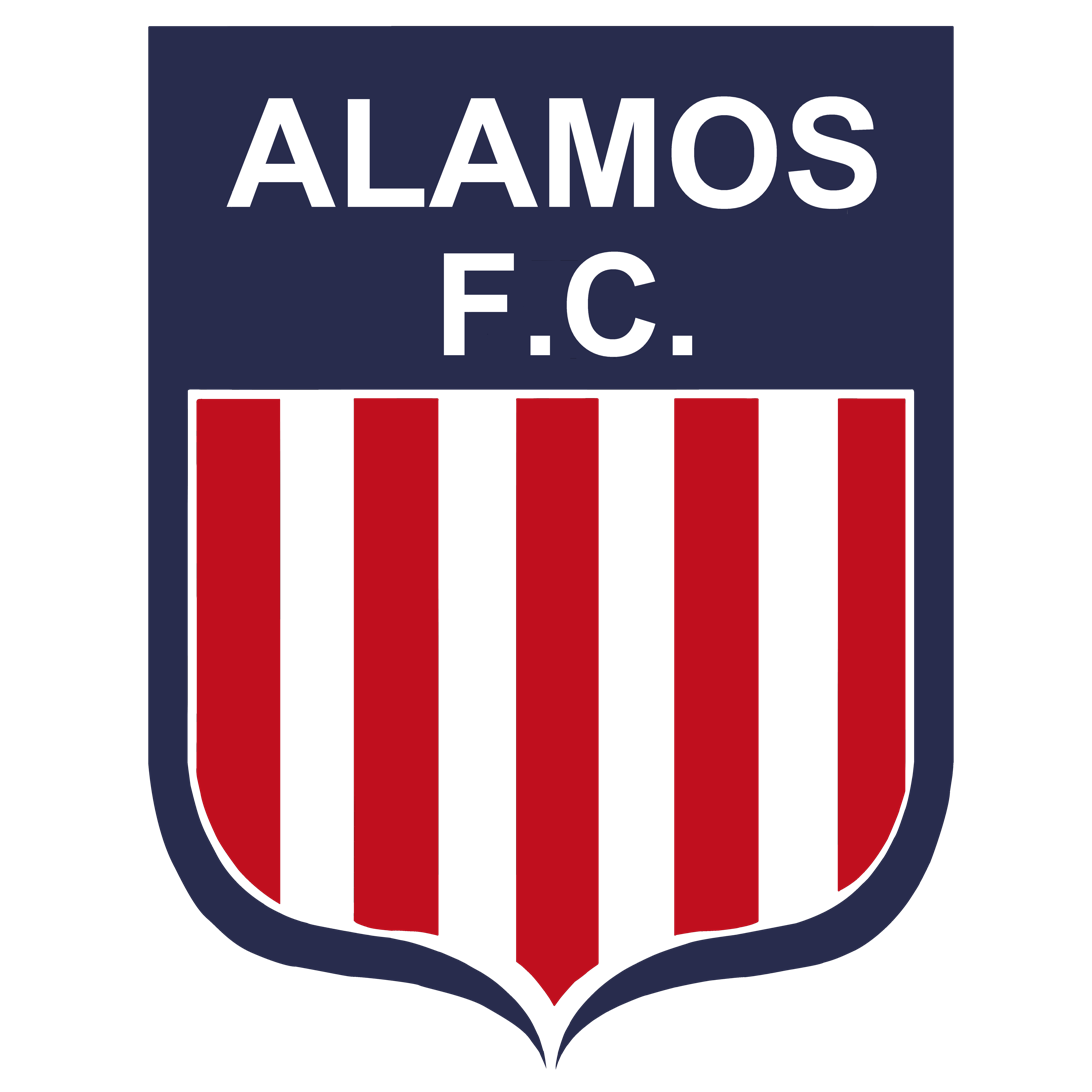
- Full name: Álamos Fútbol Club
- Nickname: Los Álamos
- Founded: 1994; 32 years ago
- Ground: Deportivo Plutarco Elías Calles; Venustiano Carranza, Mexico City
- Capacity: 300
- Owner: Grupo Omnilife
- Chairman: Amaury Vergara
- Manager: Leopoldo Moreno
- League: Liga TDP - Group IV
- 2020–21: 4th – Group IV (round of 32)
Home colours	Away colours	Third colours

Alamos F.C. is a Mexican football club founded in 1994 that plays in the Tercera División de México. The club is based in Venustiano Carranza, Mexico City and is the oldest subsidiary of Guadalajara.

== History ==
The club was founded in 1994 as a reserve squad for Guadalajara and played under the name Chivas Alamos. The club has participated in all basic force level tournaments since 1995 and currently plays in the Tercera División de México.

== See also ==
- Football in Mexico

== Honors ==
- Tercera División de México 4th Group (1): 2009-2010
