= Pedro Pineda =

Mexican footballer (born 1971)

Personal information
- Full name: Pedro Pineda Deras
- Date of birth: 30 November 1971 (age 54)
- Place of birth: Nezahualcóyotl, Mexico
- Height: 1.75 m (5 ft 9 in)
- Position: Forward

Team information
- Current team: Zaragoza (Manager)

Youth career
- 1991: AC Milan

Senior career*
Years	Team	Apps	(Gls)
1991	AC Milan	0	(0)
1991–1992	Guadalajara	18	(2)
1992–1995	Club América	12	(2)
1995–1996	Toros Neza	30	(14)
1996–1997	Club América	31	(9)
1997–1998	Necaxa	47	(24)
1999	Atlante	17	(13)
1999	Monterrey	15	(11)
2000	Cruz Azul	9	(1)
2000–2001	Pachuca	34	(15)
2001	La Piedad	9	(6)
2002–2004	Atlante	11	(3)
2003	Club Puebla	0	(0)

International career
1991	Mexico U20	5	(4)
1992	Mexico / Mexico Olympic		

Managerial career
- 2007–2010: Deportivo Lerma
- 2017: Leopardos FC
- 2018: Héroes de Veracruz
- 2021–: Zaragoza
- * Club domestic league appearances and goals

Pedro Pineda (born 30 November 1971) is a Mexican former professional footballer who played as a forward. He was a member of the Mexico national team competing at the 1992 Summer Olympics in Barcelona, Spain.

Born and raised in Nezahualcóyotl in the eastern outskirts of Mexico City, Pineda was one of the first Mexican footballers to join a Serie A club, which was AC Milan in 1991. He was signed by the club after the FIFA U-20 World Cup in 1991. After an unsuccessful stint in Milan, where he played a few league games despite his five-year contract, he returned to Mexico where he played for a number of teams in the Mexican 1st Division. He made his debut for Chivas Guadalajara in the 1991–92 season at the age of 19.

A well-traveled player, Pineda represented nine different clubs in the Mexican top flight, some more than once. Perhaps his best year came in 1998, when he scored 11 goals in both the Verano and Invierno tournaments. In that year, he played for Necaxa as the team finished second in the Verano 1998 tournament and won the Invierno 1998 tournament. Pineda also helped Pachuca to a runner-up finish in the Verano 2001 tournament.

His last job was related to Mexican football. He coached Lerma in third Mexican professional football league.

In February 2025, following the historic signing of Santiago Giménez, Pineda revealed in an interview saying that a financial fallout between the Italian club and Pineda’s management at the time led to his departure from the club.
