= Real Ánimas de Sayula =

- Full name: Real Ánimas Sayula Club de Fútbol
- Founded: October 2015; 10 years ago
- Ground: Unidad Deportiva Gustavo Díaz Ordaz; Sayula, Jalisco, Mexico
- Capacity: 4,000
- Owner(s): Jorge Isaac Arreola Núñez; Adrian C. Garcia Alcaraz
- Chairman: Jorge Isaac Arreola Núñez
- Manager: Sergio Torres Ortíz
- League: Liga TDP – Group X
- 2020–21: 4th – Group X (round of 16)
| Home colours | Away colours |

Real Ánimas Sayula C.F. is a football club that plays in the Liga TDP, based in the city of Sayula, Jalisco, Mexico.

== History ==
The team was founded in October 2015 with the aim of being an option for local youth and bringing professional football back to the city after the disappearance of clubs such as Alianza de Sayula and Tecos Sayula.

The team played its first official match on September 10, 2016, the club was defeated at home by 0–1 against Atlético Tecomán.

== Players ==
=== First-team squad ===
As of 13 March 2021

Note: Flags indicate national team as defined under FIFA eligibility rules; some limited exceptions apply. Players may hold more than one non-FIFA nationality.

| No. | Pos. | Nation | Player |
|---|---|---|---|
| 2 | DF | MEX | Sergio Segura |
| 3 | DF | MEX | Enoc García |
| 4 | DF | MEX | Sergio Orozco |
| 5 | MF | MEX | Juan Cajita |
| 6 | MF | MEX | Rogelio Rauda |
| 7 | MF | MEX | Balam Contreras |
| 8 | FW | MEX | Luis Solís |
| 9 | FW | MEX | Jesús Vázquez |
| 10 | FW | MEX | Genaro López |
| 11 | DF | MEX | André Reyes |
| 12 | GK | MEX | José Hernández |
| 13 | MF | MEX | José Lua |
| 14 | MF | MEX | Gibrán Belloso |
| 15 | DF | MEX | Roberto Hernández |

| No. | Pos. | Nation | Player |
|---|---|---|---|
| 16 | FW | MEX | Víctor López |
| 17 | MF | MEX | Axel Arias |
| 18 | FW | MEX | Luis González |
| 19 | MF | MEX | Ismael Cárdenas |
| 20 | MF | MEX | Kevin Larios |
| 21 | DF | MEX | Alan Almejo |
| 22 | FW | MEX | Paul López |
| 23 | MF | MEX | Eduardo Estrada |
| 24 | DF | MEX | Edgar Partida |
| 26 | GK | MEX | Diego Gaytán |
| 28 | MF | MEX | Iker Ortega |
| 30 | GK | MEX | Diego Magaña |
| 40 | DF | MEX | Miguel Pintor |
