= Liga de Fútbol de Tehuacán =

Tehuacán
- Full name: Liga de Fútbol de Tehuacán
- Nickname(s): Guerreros
- Founded: 1945
- Ground: Polideportivo La Huizachera; Tehuacán, Puebla
- Capacity: 1,000
- Chairman: Abel Nava
- Manager: Noé Perucho
- League: Tercera División de México
- 2020–21: 8th – Group II
Home colours	Away colours

Liga de Fútbol de Tehuacán A.C. is a Mexican football club that plays in the Tercera División de México. The club is based in Tehuacán, Puebla.

== History ==
The club was founded in 1945 as an amateur league that consisted of work factories, schools and natives of Tehuacan playing a league and cup tournament. In 1984, Mario Rivera, Mario LOpes, Jose Alameda, Jose Ronquillo and Rafael Lagos took over the club.

The club recently played in the Tercera División de México. The club is made up from the best players from the Liga Futbol de Tehuacan A.C..

== Crest ==
The crest is a football with the city of Tehuacan crest in the middle, along with the club's name in the upper outer layer. At the bottom is the club's motto, Deporte Salud y Vida(Sport Health and Life).

== See also ==
- Football in Mexico
