= Águilas de la UPAEP =

Águilas UPAEP
- Full name: Águilas de la UPAEP
- Nickname(s): Eagles
- Founded: 1975
- Ground: Nido de Aguilas,Puebla, Mexico
- Capacity: 1,000
- Manager: (Mexico)
- League: College League
Home colours	Away colours

Águilas UPAEP (Universidad Popular Autónoma del Estado de Puebla) is a Mexican football club that plays in the city of Puebla. In the mid-1970s and 1980s, the club participated in the Mexican Third and Second division but has been playing in the College League since the early 2000s.

== History ==
Águilas UPAEP was founded in 1975 in the nearly at the same time that the university it represent was founded. In 1975 the club played in a local amateur league in Puebla, winning the Copa De Barrios. The club played in the amateur leagues until 1977 when they took the place of another local club that played under the name Estudiantes Puebla (Puebla Alumni) in the Tercera División de México. The club played its first home games in the Estadio Ignacio Zaragoza. In the early 1980s the club was promoted to the 2nd Division B and was affiliated with top division club Puebla FC, lending the home stadium, Estadio Cuahutemoc, to the university.

=== 1990s ===
In 1991 the club played in the 3rd division out of the Zona Oriente, fighting for the top places, but they did not qualify that year. After a short break from professional action in 1994, the club rejoined the 2nd Division, but it almost fell through when the top division club, Puebla FC, decided not to lend them their stadium; until just before the tournament began, when the Puebla FC and Águilas finally agreed on a deal. That same year the club just avoided relegation after they managed to defeat Queretaroa, and so finishing with 24 points, one more than Yautepec, which was relegated to the 3rd division. In 1995 the club was forced to move their home games to the Estadio Trinidad in Tlaxcala after failing to pay its 20% of the stadium maintenance. In 1996 the club changed its name to Espana 2000 but returned to the original name in 1997. In the Verano 1998 the club failed to qualify for the playoffs after losing 4-1 to Cruz Azul and a draw with Atletico Chiapas.

=== Recent Years ===
In the early 2000s the club left the professional leagues and joined the College league, where they still participate and have a fierce rivalry with local University UDLA.

== Season to season ==
Season	Division	Notes
1975-78	Local League	
1978-79	3rd Division	
1979-80	3rd Division	
1980-81	3rd Division	
1981-82	3rd Division	
1982–83	2nd Division B	
1983–84	2nd Division B	
1984–85	2nd Division B	
1985–1990		No Participation
1990-91	3rd Division	
1991-92	3rd Division	
1992-93	3rd Division	
1994–95	2nd Division	
