= Catedráticos Elite F.C. =

Mexican football club

Catedráticos Elite
- Full name: Catedráticos Elite Fútbol Club
- Nickname: Catedráticos
- Founded: August 2018; 7 years ago (as Real Victoria Carmen)
- Ground: Unidad Deportiva de Etzatlán; Etzatlán, Jalisco
- Capacity: 1,000
- Owner: Juan Manuel Durán
- Chairman: Juan Manuel Durán
- Manager: Juan Manuel Camacho Piña
- League: Liga TDP – Group 14
- Clausura 2023: 11th – Group II (Liga Premier – Serie A)
Home colours	Away colours

Catedráticos Elite Fútbol Club is a football club that plays in the Tercera División de México, the bottom level division of Mexican football. It is based in the town of Etzatlán, Jalisco.

== History ==
The team was founded in August 2018 participating in the Tercera División de México under the name Real Victoria Carmen and was originally based in Tlaquepaque, Jalisco. In 2019, the team was relocated to Etzatlán, Jalisco, a municipality located 90 kilometers from its original location.

In the 2020–21 season, the team reached the promotion stage of the Tercera División de México for the first time, however it was eliminated in the round of 16 in its region by the Club RC–1128.

In July 2021, the team signed an alliance with Club RC-1128, to participate in the Segunda División de México, finally, on July 30 the incorporation of the team to this league was announced taking part in Group 1 of Serie A. However, due to an entry into a higher league, the team was relocated to Ameca, Jalisco.

On January 27, 2023, the main team was relocated from Ameca, Jalisco to Salamanca, Guanajuato. The relocation of the club occurred after a merger with Petroleros de Salamanca, because the local oil sector was interested in having a professional team in the city, for this reason the team was unofficially called Catedráticos Petroleros. Finally, on June 30, 2023, the team officially recovered the name Petroleros de Salamanca, however, due to many administrative issues the team was officially renamed as Petroleros de Salamanca Catedráticos F.C.

After the change to Petroleros de Salamanca, Catedráticos Elite still remained through the Tercera División franchise, which became the main squad for Catedráticos Elite, although as a Petroleros reserves team.

== Players ==
=== First-team squad ===
As of 28 September 2023

Note: Flags indicate national team as defined under FIFA eligibility rules; some limited exceptions apply. Players may hold more than one non-FIFA nationality.

No.	Pos.	Nation	Player
51	GK	MEX	Jorge Ramírez
55	DF	MEX	Isaac Estrada
56	MF	MEX	Marbin Luna
45	FW	MEX	Lewis Magana
59	MF	MEX	Kevin Martín del Campo
60	FW	MEX	José Ramírez
62	MF	MEX	Tristán Curiel
66	MF	MEX	Jesús Briseño
68	DF	MEX	Adrián Vera
71	GK	MEX	Ángel Figueroa
73	DF	MEX	Luis Arana
76	MF	MEX	Víctor López

No.	Pos.	Nation	Player
78	FW	MEX	Luis Ramírez
79	FW	MEX	José Ortíz
82	FW	MEX	Germán Balcázar
87	FW	MEX	Gammalihel Rivera
88	FW	MEX	Kevin Mendoza
90	DF	MEX	Arturo Valencia
94	DF	MEX	Carlos Meraz
95	MF	MEX	Jorge Carrillo
97	DF	MEX	Ricardo Vidal
98	DF	MEX	Giulian González
99	MF	MEX	Giovanni Barajas

== Managers ==
- (Mexico) Enrique Arce (2018–2019)
- (Mexico) Jorge Humberto Torres (2019–2022)
- (Mexico) Juan Carlos Ascensio (2022–2023)
- (Mexico) Juan Manuel Camacho Piña (2023–)
