= Delfines de Abasolo =

Mexican football club

- Full name: Club Deportivo Delfines de Abasolo
- Nickname: Delfines (Dolphins)
- Founded: 1978; 48 years ago
- Ground: Estadio Municipal de Abasolo; Abasolo, Guanajuato
- Capacity: 2,500
- Manager: Miguel Ángel Amador (interim)
- League: Liga TDP – Group XII
- 2022–23: 4th – Group XI (DNQ)
Home colours	Away colours	Third colours

Club Deportivo Delfines de Abasolo is a Mexican football club that plays in the Tercera División de México, the bottom level division of Mexican football. It is based in Abasolo, Guanajuato.

== History ==
The team was founded in 1978 as Club Deportivo Delfines de Abasolo, however, previously there had been other professional teams in the town such as the Club Deportivo Hidalgo and the Club Deportivo Abasolo, these teams won various regional tournaments in central Mexico.

In 1978, the Delfines began their participation in the Tercera División de México. In 1991, the team won the promotion to the Segunda División 'B' de México, after defeating Ola Naranja de Zacatecas in the promotion playoff. In 1992, the team defeated C.D. Tapatío and was promoted to the Segunda División de México. However, due to the lack of conditions to play in a better category, the team's franchise was acquired by other entrepreneurs and was relocated to Cuernavaca, Morelos and became Marte Morelos. Abasolo's team continued to play in the Tercera División, where it currently continues to play to this day.

== Stadium ==
The team plays its home games at the Estadio Municipal de Abasolo located in Abasolo, Guanajuato, which has a capacity to accommodate 2,500 spectators.

== Players ==
=== First-team squad ===
As of 17 June 2021

Note: Flags indicate national team as defined under FIFA eligibility rules; some limited exceptions apply. Players may hold more than one non-FIFA nationality.

No.	Pos.	Nation	Player
1	GK	MEX	Daniel Torres
2	DF	MEX	Alfonso Bustos
3	DF	MEX	Alan Rosales
4	MF	MEX	Carlos Tafolla
5	DF	MEX	Pedro Gallardo
6	MF	MEX	Brian Vargas
7	DF	MEX	Yahir Arellano
8	MF	MEX	Sergio Medel
9	FW	MEX	Jaime Morales
10	MF	MEX	Juan Elisarraraz
11	MF	MEX	Antonio Arellano
12	DF	MEX	Mauricio Torres
13	MF	MEX	Gerardo Negrete
14	DF	MEX	Luis Torres
15	DF	MEX	Gilberto Camarillo
16	MF	MEX	Oscar Sánchez
17	FW	MEX	Sergio Martínez
18	DF	MEX	Luz Ortiz

No.	Pos.	Nation	Player
19	FW	MEX	Hugo Martínez
20	FW	MEX	Julián Cabrera
21	FW	MEX	Víctor García
22	MF	MEX	Elías Guzmán
23	FW	MEX	Juan Carrillo
24	DF	MEX	Luis Ruiz
25	DF	MEX	Jaime Ruiz
26	FW	MEX	Rafael García
27	MF	MEX	Ricardo Cruz
28	GK	MEX	Damián Rivera
29	MF	MEX	Edson Acevedo
31	FW	MEX	Joseph Cervantes
32	GK	MEX	Daniel Vargas
41	MF	MEX	Jose Villegas
44	DF	MEX	Pablo Vargas
47	MF	MEX	Oliver Sierra
48	FW	MEX	Luis Rubio
