= C.F. Estudiantes =

Mexican football club

Cf Estudiantes San Felipe
- Full name: Club de Fútbol Estudiantes
- Founded: 1992
- Ground: Estadio Margarito Esquivel; San Felipe del Progreso, State of Mexico
- Capacity: 1,000
- Chairman: Fidel Almanza Monroy
- League: Liga TDP - Group VI
Home colours	Away colours

Club de Fútbol Estudiantes San Felipe is a Mexican football club that plays in the Liga TDP. The club is based in San Felipe del Progreso, State of Mexico and was founded in 1991. In 2019 the team was relocated from Atlacomulco to El Oro, in 2022 they returned to Atlacomulco.

== See also ==
- Football in Mexico
- Tercera División de México
