= Deportivo CAFESSA Tlajomulco =

Mexican football club

CAFESSA Tlajomulco
- Full name: Deportivo CAFESSA
- Founded: 29 August 2015; 11 years ago
- Ground: Unidad Deportiva Mariano Otero, Tlajomulco de Zúñiga, Jalisco, Mexico
- Capacity: 3,000
- Owner: Martín Castañeda
- Chairman: Martín Castañeda
- Manager: Julio García
- League: Liga TDP – Group 14
- 2025–26: Pre–season
Home colours	Away colours

The Deportivo CAFESSA, commonly known as CAFESSA or CAFESSA Tlajomulco, is a Mexican football club based in Tlajomulco de Zúñiga.

== History ==
The club was founded in 2015, and currently plays in the Liga TDP.

In June 2019, Deportivo CAFESSA Jalisco was created, before, CAFESSA Tlajomulco served as the main team of the franchise. Subsequently, after the creation of CAFESSA Jalisco, it became the main reserve team of the club, although maintaining its own identity with respect to Jalisco. In the same season, CAFESSA established another Liga TDP team at Tonalá, Jalisco.

In 2021, the owner of CAFESSA put all the teams of the club on hiatus due to the lack of guarantees for a possible future category promotion after the rejection of C.D. Irapuato in the Liga de Expansión MX, in 2022 the franchise was not reactivated, therefore, it was considered officially dissolved. However, the team was reactivated in August 2025 to participate in the Liga TDP since the 2025–26 season.

== Players ==
=== Current squad ===
As of September 30, 2025

Note: Flags indicate national team as defined under FIFA eligibility rules; some limited exceptions apply. Players may hold more than one non-FIFA nationality.

No.	Pos.	Nation	Player
1	MF	MEX	Samuel Núñez
2	MF	MEX	Fabián Tejeda
3	DF	MEX	Christian Magdaleno
4	DF	MEX	José Méndez
5	MF	MEX	Carlos Contreras
6	MF	MEX	Cristopher Amezola
7	MF	MEX	Ares González
8	MF	MEX	Christopher Díaz
9	FW	MEX	Martín Ramírez
10	MF	MEX	Brandon Sánchez
11	FW	MEX	Jovanni Sánchez
12	GK	MEX	Leonardo Moreno
13	MF	MEX	Jesús García

No.	Pos.	Nation	Player
14	DF	MEX	Francisco Corona
15	MF	MEX	Abdiel Padilla
18	MF	MEX	Sergio Valdez
19	MF	MEX	Axel Lazo
20	FW	MEX	Hugo Tacalo
21	FW	MEX	Israel Alcázar
23	MF	MEX	Noel Escatel
24	FW	MEX	Ángel Hernández
25	MF	MEX	Arturo García
27	MF	MEX	Andrés Contreras
28	MF	MEX	José Riebling
29	FW	MEX	Luis Morales
30	GK	MEX	Lázaro Figueroa

== See also ==
- Deportivo CAFESSA Jalisco
