= Liga TDP =

Association football league in Mexico

- Organising body: Mexican Football Federation
- Founded: 1967; 59 years ago as Tercera División Profesional de México
- Country: Mexico
- Confederation: CONCACAF
- President: José Concepción Escobedo
- Number of clubs: 246 (Zona A and Zona B)
- Level on pyramid: 4
- Promotion to: Liga Premier
- Domestic cup(s): Cup tournament Copa Conecta; Reserve tournament Torneo de Filiales de la Liga TDP
- Current champions: Delfines de Coatzacoalcos (1st title)
- Most championships: Celaya; San Luis; Tecos UAG; Atlético Tecomán; Real Cuautitlán; Deportivo Cihuatlán; Héroes de Zaci (2 titles each)
- Website: ligatdp.mx
- Current: 2026–27 Liga TDP season

Liga TDP is a professional association football league in Mexico and the fourth level of the Mexican football league system. The league is contested by 246 participating clubs, organized into two zones (Zona A with 136 clubs and Zona B with 110 clubs), divided into 18 groups by geographic location. The season consists of an annual tournament, and the champions are decided by a final knockout phase in each zone. Since the 2020–21 season, the Zona A and Zona B champions compete in the national final and the winners are crowned champions of the Liga TDP.

Formerly known as Tercera División Profesional de México (1967–2017). The league has been held in 67 editions, the inaugural season was played in 1967–68 with Deportivo Zapata crowned as the first champions.

From 1967 to 1994, it was the third level league of Mexican football. The 18 groups consist of clubs eligible for four promotion spots to Liga Premier, if they meet all infrastructure and economic stability requirements. The teams affiliated with a club in a higher level league are not eligible for promotion.

Fifty-nine clubs have been champions at least once. Celaya, San Luis, Tecos UAG, Atlético Tecomán, Real Cuautitlán, Deportivo Cihuatlán and Héroes de Zaci are the most successful clubs with two titles each.

== History ==
=== Tercera División Profesional de México (1967–2017) ===
In 1967, the FMF created the Tercera División Profesional de México as the third-level professional league, it was one of the three leagues originally created for the Mexican football league system, along with the Primera División and Segunda División. The inaugural season had sixteen founding clubs: Asociación Deportiva Orizabeña, Chalco, Cuatitlán, Cuautla, Deportivo Zapata, Electra, Gutiérrez Zamora, Iguala, Las Brisas, Naucalpan, Potros UAEM Querétaro, San Luis, San Marcos, U de Puebla and UV de Coatzacoalcos.

The participating clubs were divided into two zones of eight clubs by geographic location. Two phases of 14 rounds each were played, the two zone winners from each phase qualified for the final championship group, which consisted of a round-robin format with six rounds played.

From 1994, the Tercera División became the fourth level of Mexican football, due to the creation of the Primera División 'A' as an intermediate league between the Primera and Segunda División. Since the 1992–93 season, teams affiliated with Primera División clubs have been integrated into the Tercera División, which are commonly known as "filiales". From 2001 to 2008, two short tournaments were played per season.

=== Liga TDP (2017–present) ===
In 2017, the league was rebranded as Liga TDP with 215 participating clubs divided into two zones with 13 groups by geographic location. The final phase included 72 clubs and consisted of seven stages.

Since the 2020–21 season, the competition format has been modified and the clubs have been divided into two zones with 18 groups by geographic location, both zones were renamed as Zona A and Zona B. A final phase with 32 clubs is contested in each zone with a trophy awarded to the champions of each zone, and they also advance to the national final known as Campeón de Campeones de la Liga TDP to define the champions of the Liga TDP.

== Competition format ==
=== Regular phase ===
One tournament is played per season, throughout the FIFA's world footballing calendar, the 246 clubs are divided into two zones with 18 groups by geographic location. Zona A consists of nine groups (1–9) and Zona B consists of nine groups (10–18), each group has 9 to 16 participating clubs. The Liga TDP is played in a double round-robin format, with each club facing all other participating clubs twice during the season, except against clubs located in its own group. A penalty shootout is held in matches that end in a draw, the winners get an extra point.

The teams known as "filiales" also participate, which are the reserve teams affiliated with clubs at higher levels (Liga MX, Liga de Expansión MX and Liga Premier). These clubs are not eligible for promotion, however, they qualify for its own final knockout phase for the affiliated teams title, known as Torneo de Filiales de la Liga TDP.

=== Final phase ===
The final phase consists of 64 participating clubs, the best 32 clubs from each zone qualify for the final knockout phase. In each zone, the round of 16, quarter-finals, semifinals and final are played with a home and away format, and the winners being determined by the aggregate score.

The champions of Zona A and Zona B compete in the national final for the league's main title, known as Campeón de Campeones de la Liga TDP, and the winners are crowned officially as the Liga TDP champions.

The national champions and runners-up, and also the runners-up from Zona A and Zona B will be promoted, according to their infrastructure and the requirements of the Liga Premier.

=== Promotion ===
Four clubs from Liga TDP will be promoted to Liga Premier, the national champions and runners-up will be promoted to Serie A, the runners-up from Zona A and Zona B will be promoted to Serie B. Depending on their economic and sporting infraestructure, the clubs promoted to Serie A could be placed in Serie B in case of failure to comply with the requirements of Serie A.

==== Certification requirements ====
For Liga TDP certificate be considered, you must meet the social, sporting, financial and legal requirements; clubs who win promotion and get the support settlement letter from the division to participate in the Liga Premier complying with the following:

- Having full legal rule and membership record with the corporate documents, legal and financial sport under the rules of affiliation, name and headquarters.
- Facilities must comply with the guidelines by the rules of membership, name and ground of Liga Premier.
- Having no debt in the statement of the division or FMF.

== Participating clubs ==
=== 2026–27 season ===
The 2026–27 Liga TDP season has the following 246 participating clubs.

=== Zona A ===
Group I	Group II	Group III
Boston Cancún^{2}; Corsarios de Campeche; Deportiva Venados TDP^{3}; Deportivo Chetumal; Deportivo CTM Búhos; Ejidatarios de Bonfil; Guerreros Cozumel (Note: Loan of Los Ángeles.); Inter Playa TDP^{3}; Itzaes (Note: Loan of Progreso.)^{2}; Marinos ISG; Mons Calpe Yucatán; Pioneros Junior^{3}	Alebrijes de Oaxaca TDP^{2}; Antequera; Chapulineros de Oaxaca TDP^{3}; Cefor Chiapas; Dragones de Oaxaca TDP^{3}; Felinos 48; Jaguares TDP^{3}; Huracanes de Arriaga (Note: Loan of PRO CAMP.); Lechuzas UPGCH; Milenarios de Oaxaca (Note: Loan of Lobos ITECA.); Napoli Tabasco (Note: Loan of Academia Dragones.)^{3}; Pavones ADMC; Pijijiapan (Note: Loan of Iguanas.); Plataneros de Tabasco; Tapachula Soconusco TDP^{3}; UDS	Afouteza Xalapa (Note: Loan of Formación Metropolitana.); Águila Azteca; Atlético Boca del Río; Caballeros de Córdoba; Chayoteros Ixtac; Conejos de Tuxtepec; Córdoba; Delfines UGM; Delfines Universidad de Sotavento (Note: Loan of Delfines de Coatzacoalcos TDP.)^{3}; Manta Rayas; Montañeses-Potros Casino Español^{3}; Performance; Piratas Minatitlán^{3}; Piratas Poza Rica^{3}; Piratas Sozca^{3}; Racing de Veracruz TDP^{3}

Group IV	Group V	Group VI
Cafeteros de Atlixco; Cóndor; Delta; Deportivo JEM; Deportivo Zapata; Guerreros de Puebla; Licántropos; Liga de Tehuacán; Ocelot Academy MX (Note: Loan of Tlapa.); PDLA; Real Morelos 27; Real Tlaxcala (Note: Loan of Atlético Tulancingo.); Reales de Puebla; Selva Cañera; Yautepec	Álamos; Alebrijes CDMX^{2}; Aragón; Around Soccer; Aztecas AMF Soccer; Azul Real Jilo (Note: Loan of Valle de Xico.); CDM^{3}; Coyotes Neza (Note: Loan of Halcones Zúñiga.); FORMAFUTINTEGRAL; Gama Soccer (Note: Loan of Novillos Neza.); Halcones de Rayón; Héroes de Zaci TDP^{3}; León Izcalli (Note: Loan of Muxes.); Politécnico; Oceanía	Arietes; CEFAR Azul Iztacalco (Note: Loan of Ciervos TDP.); CEFOR 3030; CH Fútbol Club; Club Unión; Cruz Azul Tultepec (Note: Loan of Atlético Mexicano.)^{1}; Ecatepec; Guardianes de Oriente; Independiente Mexiquense; LLO; Marina; Nicolás Romero (Note: Loan of Cañoneros TDP.)^{3}; Sangre de Campeón; TBA (Note: Loan of Colegio Once México.); TBA (Note: Loan of Lonsdaleíta.); TBA (Note: Loan of Sk Sport Street Soccer.)

Group VII	Group VIII	Group IX
Águilas UAGro; América TDP^{1}; Balam (Note: Loan of Huracanes Izcalli TDP.)^{3}; Cantera Coka; CEFOR Mexiquense (Note: Loan of Domínguez Osos.); CILESI; Club de Fútbol RX; Cuemanco (Note: Loan of Atlético Pachuca.); Guerreros del Pacífico TDP^{3}; Mineros Carranza CDMX^{2}; Mineros CDMX^{2}; Olimpo; San José del Arenal; Villa (Note: Loan from Atlético Cuernavaca.)	Ajolotes Lerma; Artesanos Huixquilucan^{3}; Artesanos Metepec TDP^{3}; CID Leones Negros Toluca (Note: Loan of Grupo Sherwood.)^{2}; Cordobés TDP^{3}; Dragones Toluca; Estudiantes; Fuerza Mazahua; Guerreros Dorados (Note: Loan of Iguala.); Leones Huixquilucan; Luma Sports; Marlines; Metepec; Orishas Tepeji; Real Santa Fe; Real TM	Águilas de Teotihuacán; Alebrijes Teotihuacán^{2}; Atlético de la Plata (Note: Loan of Caudillos de Morelos.); Atlético Sierra Hermosa; Atlético Hidalgo TDP^{3}; Bombarderos de Tecámac; Centro de Talentos Volten; Hidalguense; Héroes de Zaci Hidalgo^{3}; Industriales de Altamira; Jaiba Brava TDP^{2}; Pachuca TDP^{1}; Santiago Tulantepec; Soles Teotihuacán (Note: Loan of Matamoros.); UFD Tuzos Pachuca^{1}; Toltecas Universidad CAPEC

=== Zona B ===
Group X	Group XI	Group XII
Cajeteros Celaya; CEFOMH; Celaya Linces; Estudiantes de Querétaro; Fundadores; Instituto de Fútbol de Alta Competencia; Inter de Querétaro (Note: Loan of Atlético Huejutla.); La Piedad Querétaro; Lobos ULMX TDP^{3}; Metaleros de Zimapán; San Juan del Río; Titanes de Querétaro; TBA (Note: Loan of BFC.)	Aguacateros CDU; Atlético Morelia–UMSNH^{2}; Guerreros Zacapu (Note: Loan of Atlético Valladolid.); Delfines de Abasolo; Deportivo Sahuayo; Deportivo Zamora; Furia Azul; La Piedad Imperial; Purépechas TDP^{3}	Atlético ECCA; Brujas Soccer; CEFOR Promotora San Luis; Centro de Especialización de Futbolistas LU; Empresarios del Rincón (Note: Loan of Real Olmeca Sport.); Gorilas TDP^{3}; León GEN^{1}; Leyendas; Magos Unión Deportiva; Mineros de Zacatecas TDP^{2}; Necaxa TDP^{1}; Pabellón; Santa Ana del Conde; Trinca de Mi Vida; Tuzos UAZ TDP^{3}

Group XIII	Group XIV	Group XV
Agaveros; Alfareros de Tlaquepaque; Aves Blancas; Charales de Chapala; Gorilas de Juanacatlán^{3}; Grizzly (Note: Loan of Deportivo Cimagol.); Jabalís Mirasol; Leones Negros UdeG TDP^{2}; Nacional; Tapatíos Soccer; Tepatitlán TDP^{2}; Zapotlanejo TDP^{3}	Atlético Cuauhtémoc (Note: Loan of Hermanos Benítez.); Atlético Punto Sur (Note: Loan of Club Suré.); Caja Oblatos; CAR Toros; Deportivo CAFESSA Tlajomulco; Deportivo El Grullo; Deportivo Purificación (Note: Loan of Guerreros de Autlán TDP.)^{3}; Elite Darka (Note: Loan of Catedráticos Elite.); Gambeta; Loros UdeC (Note: Loan of ACF Acatlán.)^{3}; Progreso de Cocula (Note: Loan of Tlaxcala TDP.)^{2}; Real Ánimas de Sayula	Atlético Tesistán; Club Legado del Centenario; Diablos Tesistán; SD Eibar Mexiko (Note: Loan of Volcanes de Colima.); Fuerza Huracán (Note: Loan of Fénix CFAR.); Gallos Viejos; GDL United (Note: Loan of Deportivo Aviña.); Guadalajara TDP^{1}; Oro; Sporting AKD (Note: Loan of Castores Gobrantacto.); Tecos TDP^{3}; Tornados Tlaquepaque (Note: Loan of Guerreros de Autlán-Tlaquepaque.)^{3}

Group XVI	Group XVII	Group XVIII
Atlético Acaponeta; Atlético Nayarit; Dorados de Sinaloa TDP^{2}; Halcones de Nayarit; Naayari; Puerto Vallarta; Real Refineros TDP^{3}; Sufacen Tepic; Tigres de Álica TDP^{3}; VADS; Xalisco	Académicos de la SEED (Note: Loan of Fut–Car.); Cadereyta; Calor TDP^{3}; Correcaminos UAT TDP^{3}; Cuervos Tec Nuevo León (Note: Loan of Gallos Nuevo León.); Escobedo (Note: Loan of Real San Cosme.); Guerreros Reynosa; Halcones de Saltillo; Inter Nuevo León (Note: Loan of San Pedro 7-10.); Irritilas; Leones Nuevo León; Real Apodaca TDP^{3}; Nuevo León; Santiago TDP^{3}; T-Rex de Ramos Arizpe (Note: Loan of Querétaro 3D.)	Atlético Tijuana; Cachanillas; Cobras Fútbol Premier; Datileros de San Luis RC; Delfines Baja; Deportivo Etchojoa; La Tribu de Ciudad Juárez TDP^{3}; Obson Dynamo; Soles de Sonora; Sporting de Sonora; Xoloitzcuintles de Caliente^{1}

Notes

1. Affiliate teams of Liga MX club.
2. Affiliate teams of Liga de Expansión MX club.
3. Affiliate teams of Liga Premier club.

== Performances ==
Rank	Club	Titles	Runners-up	Seasons
1	Celaya^{5}	2	2	1973–74, 1990–91
1	San Luis^{5}	2	0	1969–70, Mex–1970
1	Tecos UAG^{4}	2	0	1972–73, 2016–17
1	Atlético Tecomán^{5}	2	0	1982–83, Cla–2004
1	Real Cuautitlán^{5}	2	0	1996–97, 2011–12
1	Deportivo Cihuatlán	2	0	1998–99, Cla–2007
1	Héroes de Zaci^{3}	2	0	2018–19, 2024–25
8	Potros UAEM^{5}	1	2	1974–75
8	Atlético San Francisco^{3}	1	2	1991–92
8	Águila Progreso Industrial^{5}	1	1	1986–87
8	Deportivo Tepic B^{5}	1	1	Ape–2002
8	Soccer Manzanillo/ América Manzanillo^{5}	1	1	Cla–2006
8	Acatlán^{3}	1	1	2017–18
8	Deportivo Zapata^{5}	1	0	1967–68
8	Naucalpan^{5}	1	0	1968–69
8	Lobos de Querétaro^{5}	1	0	1970–71
8	Orizaba^{5}	1	0	1971–72
8	TAMSA^{5}	1	0	1975–76
8	Osos Grises^{5}	1	0	1976–77
8	Deportivo Zamora^{5}	1	0	1977–78
8	Lobos de Tlaxcala^{5}	1	0	1978–79
8	Oaxtepec-IMSS^{5}	1	0	1979–80
8	Azucareros de Córdoba^{5}	1	0	1980–81
8	Poza Rica^{4}	1	0	1981–82
8	San Mateo Atenco^{5}	1	0	1983–84
8	Búfalos Curtidores^{5}	1	0	1984–85
8	Progreso de Cocula^{5}	1	0	1985–86
8	Ecatepec^{5}	1	0	1987–88
8	Ayense^{3}	1	0	1988–89
8	Zitlaltepec^{5}	1	0	1989–90
8	Colimense^{5}	1	0	1992–93
8	Tigrillos UANL^{5}	1	0	1993–94
8	Monterrey FAAC^{5}	1	0	1994–95
8	Deportivo Zitácuaro^{4}	1	0	1995–96
8	Cachorros de Sayula^{5}	1	0	1997–98
8	Chivas Verde Valle^{5}	1	0	1999–00
8	Pumas Naucalpan^{5}	1	0	2000–01
8	Académicos^{5}	1	0	Inv–2001
8	Alacranes de Apatzingán^{5}	1	0	Ver–2002
8	Inter Playa del Carmen^{3}	1	0	Cla–2003
8	Jersy Nay Ixcuintla^{5}	1	0	Ape–2003
8	Deportivo Autlán B^{5}	1	0	Ape–2004
8	Atlético Cuauhtémoc^{5}	1	0	Cla–2005
8	Tecamachalco^{5}	1	0	Cla–2006
8	Búhos de Hermosillo	1	0	Ape–2006
8	Atlético Comonfort^{5}	1	0	Ape–2007
8	Soccer Manzanillo B^{5}	1	0	Cla–2008
8	Héroes de Caborca^{5}	1	0	2008–09
8	Patriotas de Córdoba^{5}	1	0	2009–10
8	Vaqueros de Ixtlán^{5}	1	0	2010–11
8	Poblado Miguel Alemán^{5}	1	0	2012–13
8	Tuzos Pachuca	1	0	2013–14
8	Aguacateros CDU^{3}	1	0	2014–15
8	Leones Negros C	1	0	2015–16
8	Fuertes de Fortín^{5}	1	0	2020–21
8	Mazorqueros B^{5}	1	0	2021–22
8	Aguacateros de Peribán^{3}	1	0	2022–23
8	Faraones de Texcoco^{5}	1	0	2023–24
8	Delfines de Coatzacoalcos^{3}	1	0	2025–26
60	Querétaro^{1}	0	2	—
60	Grupo Yucatán/ Itzaes	0	2	—
60	Loros UdeC	0	2	—
60	Potros Neza^{5}	0	2	—
60	Cruz Azul Xochimilco^{5}	0	2	—
60	Sporting Canamy^{4}	0	2	—
60	Cuautla^{5}	0	1	—
60	Tecnológico de Celaya^{5}	0	1	—
60	España Veracruz^{5}	0	1	—
60	Nuevo Necaxa^{5}	0	1	—
60	Tapatío^{2}	0	1	—
60	Estudiantes de Querétaro^{5}	0	1	—
60	Torreón^{5}	0	1	—
60	Universitario Xalapeño^{5}	0	1	—
60	UV de Coatzacoalcos^{5}	0	1	—
60	Leones de Río Blanco^{5}	0	1	—
60	Águilas UPAEP^{5}	0	1	—
60	Gallos Blancos UAQ^{5}	0	1	—
60	Arroceros de Chetumal^{5}	0	1	—
60	Alianza de Sayula^{5}	0	1	—
60	Cruz Azul Hidalgo^{2}	0	1	—
60	Gallos de Ciudad Juárez^{5}	0	1	—
60	Delfines de Xalapa^{5}	0	1	—
60	Cruz Azul Oaxaca^{5}	0	1	—
60	Coacalco^{5}	0	1	—
60	Chalco^{5}	0	1	—
60	Guasave^{5}	0	1	—
60	Atlético Carmen^{5}	0	1	—
60	Garzas UAEH^{5}	0	1	—
60	América Acoxpa^{5}	0	1	—
60	Tecamachalco B^{5}	0	1	—
60	Azucareros de Tezonapa^{5}	0	1	—
60	Tuxtepec^{5}	0	1	—
60	Cacaoteros de Tabasco^{5}	0	1	—
60	América Zapata^{5}	0	1	—
60	Sufacen Tepic^{5}	0	1	—
60	Inter de Xalapa^{5}	0	1	—
60	Teca Huixquilucan^{5}	0	1	—
60	Club Santos Casino^{4}	0	1	—
60	Calor de San Pedro^{3}	0	1	—
60	Tecamachalco Sur^{5}	0	1	—
60	Real Zamora^{4}	0	1	—
60	Valle Verde Jiquipilas^{5}	0	1	—
60	Marina^{3}	0	1	—
60	Club RC-1128^{5}	0	1	—
60	Deportiva Venados^{3}	0	1	—
60	Atlético Aragón	0	1	—
60	Atlético Cocula^{3}	0	1	—
60	Saltillo Soccer^{3}	0	1	—

Notes

1. Currently in Liga MX.
2. Currently in Liga de Expansión MX.
3. Currently in Liga Premier.
4. Currently on hiatus.
5. Defunct.

== Zone finals ==
=== Liga TDP Zona A ===
Rank	Club	Titles	Runners-up	Seasons
1	Fuertes de Fortín	1	0	2020–21
1	Deportiva Venados	1	0	2021–22
1	Atlético Aragón	1	0	2022–23
1	Faraones de Texcoco	1	0	2023–24
1	Héroes de Zaci	1	0	2024–25
1	Delfines de Coatzacoalcos	1	0	2025–26
7	Toluca TDP	0	1	—
7	Avispones de Chilpancingo	0	1	—
7	Artesanos Metepec	0	1	—
7	Yautepec	0	1	—
7	Dragones de Oaxaca	0	1	—
7	Cruz Azul Lagunas	0	1	—

=== Liga TDP Zona B ===
Rank	Club	Titles	Runners-up	Seasons
1	Club RC–1128	1	0	2020–21
1	Mazorqueros B	1	0	2021–22
1	Aguacateros de Peribán	1	0	2022–23
1	Acatlán	1	0	2023–24
1	Atlético Cocula	1	0	2024–25
1	Saltillo Soccer	1	0	2025–26
7	Deportivo CAFESSA	0	1	—
7	Real Ánimas de Sayula	0	1	—
7	Poza Rica	0	1	—
7	Tigres de Álica	0	1	—
7	Gorilas de Juanacatlán	0	1	—
7	La Tribu de Ciudad Juárez	0	1	—

== Cup tournament ==
Copa de la Tercera División was a domestic cup tournament for clubs in the Tercera División, it was held between 1968 and 1981.

The tournament was held in eight editions, the inaugural season was played in 1968–69 with Querétaro crowned as the first champions. Eight clubs were champions at least once. Querétaro, San Luis, Tecnológico de Celaya, Tlalnepantla, Tapatío, Potros UAEM, Osos Grises and U de Jalapa were the most successful clubs with one title each.

=== Performances ===
Rank	Club	Titles	Runners-up	Seasons
1	Querétaro	1	0	1968–69
1	San Luis	1	0	1969–70
1	Tecnológico de Celaya	1	0	1970–71
1	Tlalnepantla	1	0	1971–72
1	Tapatío	1	0	1972–73
1	Potros UAEM	1	0	1974–75
1	Osos Grises	1	0	1975–76
1	U de Jalapa	1	0	1980–81
9	Cuautla	0	1	—
9	Cuautitlán	0	1	—
9	Iguala	0	1	—
9	Leones Negros UdeG	0	1	—
9	U de Tamaulipas	0	1	—
9	SUOO	0	1	—
9	Uruapan	0	1	—

== Campeón de Campeones ==
Campeón de Campeones de la Tercera División was a domestic super cup contested by the league and cup champions of the Tercera División, it was held between 1969 and 1975.

The trophy was contested in six editions, the inaugural match was played in 1969 with Querétaro crowned as the first champions. Six clubs were champions at least once. Querétaro, San Luis, Tecnológico de Celaya, Tlalnepantla, Tecos UAG and Potros UAEM were the most successful clubs with one title each.

=== Performances ===
Rank	Club	Titles	Runners-up	Seasons
1	Querétaro	1	0	1969
1	San Luis	1	0	1970^{1}
1	Tecnológico de Celaya	1	0	1971
1	Tlalnepantla	1	0	1972
1	Tecos UAG	1	0	1973
1	Potros UAEM	1	0	1975^{1}
7	Naucalpan	0	1	—
7	Lobos de Querétaro	0	1	—
7	Orizaba	0	1	—
7	Tapatío	0	1	—

Notes

1. Automatic winners of the trophy for winning the season's league and cup tournament.

== See also ==
- Sport in Mexico
- Football in Mexico
- Mexican football league system
- Mexican Football Federation
- Liga MX
- Liga de Expansión MX
- Ascenso MX
- Liga Premier
- Copa Conecta
- Copa Promesas MX
