= 2026–27 Liga Premier B season =

Liga Premier B
- Season: 2026–27
- Matches: 39
- Goals: 149 (3.82 per match)
- Top goalscorer: 2 players (8 goals)
- Biggest home win: Ayense 11–0 Atlético Hidalgo (31 October 2026)
- Biggest away win: Atlético Hidalgo 0–10 Racing de Veracruz B (6 November 2026)
- Highest scoring: Ayense 11–0 Atlético Hidalgo (31 October 2026)
- Longest winning run: 6 matches Racing de Veracruz B
- Longest unbeaten run: 8 matches Racing de Veracruz B
- Longest winless run: 8 matches Atlético Hidalgo
- Longest losing run: 8 matches Atlético Hidalgo
- Highest attendance: 470; Ayense vs Huracanes Izcalli (29 August 2026)
- Lowest attendance: 30; Huracanes Izcalli vs Atlético Hidalgo (2 October 2026)
- Total attendance: 3,730
- Average attendance: 207
- Stats are from the regular season only

The 2026–27 Liga Premier B season is part of the third-tier football league of Mexico. The tournament began on 28 August 2026 and will finish on 2 May 2027.

Starting this season the Premier B became the third branch of the Liga Premier de México, with the developing clubs with less infrastructure, but committed to improving in order to aspire to participate in Premier A in medium term.

== Offseason changes ==
- On 18 April 2026, Artesanos Metepec was promoted from Liga Premier B to Liga Premier A.
- On 23 May 2026, Cruz Azul Lagunas was promoted from Liga TDP to Liga Premier B.
- On 16 June 2026, Dragones de Oaxaca announced that they successfully passed the financial and sporting certification, and were therefore accepted into Premier A.
- On 25 June 2026, Gorilas de Juanacatlán was relocated to León, Guanajuato and renamed Gorilas F.C.
- On 8 July 2026, Acámbaro announced that they successfully passed the financial and sporting certification, and were therefore accepted into Premier A.
- On July 2026, F.C. Racing was rebranded as Racing de Veracruz B.
- On 1 August 2026, Atlético Hidalgo was relocated to Liga Premier B.
- On 1 August 2026, Internacional Laguna joined the league as expansion team.
- On 1 August 2026, Caja Oblatos and Poza Rica went on hiatus.
- On 10 August 2026, Aguacateros CDU went on hiatus.
- On 10 August 2026, Atlético Celaya B, Héroes de Zaci B and Irapuato B joined the league as expansion teams.
- On 14 August 2026, Racing de Veracruz B was relocated from Boca del Río, Veracruz to San Juan Bautista Tuxtepec, Oaxaca because the club was left without a stadium in Veracruz following the closure of the Unidad Deportiva Hugo Sánchez in February 2026.

== Teams ==
The 2026–27 Liga Premier B season has the following 10 participating clubs.

Locations of Liga Premier B clubs in the 2026–27 season.

Club	Manager	City	Stadium	Capacity
Atlético Celaya B (Note: Team affiliated with Atlético Celaya.)	(Mexico) Nicolás Trejo	Celaya	Miguel Alemán Valdés	23,182
Atlético Hidalgo	(Mexico) Ángel Mejia	Atitalaquia	Municipal de Atitalaquía	3,000
Ayense	(Mexico) Conrado Castillo	Ayotlán	Chino Rivas	3,500
Cruz Azul Lagunas (Note: Team affiliated with Cruz Azul.)	(Mexico) Alexis López	Lagunas	Deportivo La Laguna	2,000
Gorilas	(Mexico) Everaldo Begines	León	Instituto Oviedo Náutico	800
Héroes de Zaci B (Note: Team affiliated with Héroes de Zaci.)	(Mexico) Pablo Robles	Nezahualcóyotl	Metropolitano	1,800
Huracanes Izcalli	(Mexico) Arturo Viche	Mexico City	Momoxco	3,500
Internacional Laguna	(Argentina) Miguel Ángel Vargas	Gómez Palacio	Unidad Deportiva Francisco Gómez Palacio	4,000
Irapuato B (Note: Team affiliated with Irapuato.)	(Mexico) Víctor Mendoza	Irapuato	Sergio León Chávez	25,000
Racing de Veracruz B (Note: Team affiliated with Racing de Veracruz.)	(Mexico) Alejandro Romero	San Juan Bautista Tuxtepec	Gustavo Pacheco Villaseñor	15,000

== Regular season ==
=== Standings ===
Pos	Team	Pld	W	D	L	GF	GA	GD	BP	Pts	Qualification or relegation
1	Racing de Veracruz B (Note: Reserves team; does not participate in the promotion playoffs.)	9	8	1	0	39	5	+34	4	29	Advance to Torneo de Filiales (Note: The first 2 reserves teams qualify for the Torneo Talento Premier Filiales.)
2	Gorilas	9	7	1	1	30	8	+22	2	24	Advance to Liguilla (Note: The first 4 places that carry the right to promotion qualify for the Liguilla.)
3	Atlético Celaya B	9	5	2	2	18	12	+6	1	18	Advance to Torneo de Filiales
4	Cruz Azul Lagunas	8	5	1	2	12	7	+5	0	16	
5	Irapuato B	8	4	1	3	12	13	−1	1	14	
6	Huracanes Izcalli	8	3	1	4	15	13	+2	2	12	Advance to Liguilla
7	Ayense	9	3	1	5	21	9	+12	1	11	Advance to Liguilla
8	Héroes de Zaci B	9	2	1	6	8	21	−13	1	8	
9	Internacional Laguna	9	1	1	7	8	32	−24	0	4	Advance to Liguilla
10	Atlético Hidalgo	8	0	0	8	5	48	−43	0	0	

Updated to match(es) played on 21 November 2026. Source: Liga Premier FMF

==== Results ====
Each team will play 18 matches during the season against their tier rivals, playing both home and away.

Home \ Away	ATH	AYE	CEL	CRZ	GOR	HER	HUR	INT	IRA	RVE
Atlético Hidalgo	—		0–6							0–10
Ayense	11–0	—					2–0		1–2	1–2
Atlético Celaya B		2–0	—	1–1		2–0	1–1		2–1	
Cruz Azul Lagunas		2–1		—	1–0	2–0	2–1			0–1
Gorilas	7–0	1–0	3–1		—	6–2		5–0		
Héroes de Zaci B	3–2	0–0				—	0–2		0–3	
Huracanes Izcalli	6–1				2–4		—			0–2
Internacional Laguna	3–1	0–5	2–3	1–2		0–2	1–3	—		
Irapuato B	2–1			2–1	0–2			1–1	—	1–5
Racing de Veracruz B			4–0		2–2	3–1		10–0		—

Updated to match(es) played on 21 November 2026. Source: Liga Premier FMF
Legend: Blue = home team win; Yellow = draw; Red = away team win.

=== Regular season statistics ===
==== Top goalscorers ====
Players sorted first by goals scored, then by last name.

Rank	Player	Club	Goals
1	(Mexico) Julián Payares	Racing de Veracruz B	8
1	(Mexico) Fabián Razo	Gorilas	8
3	(Mexico) Yair Martínez	Racing de Veracruz B	7
3	(Mexico) Álvaro Vidales	Racing de Veracruz B	7
5	(Mexico) Daniel Monsivaís	Ayense	5
6	(Mexico) José Birche	Racing de Veracruz B	4
6	(Mexico) Omar Muro	Internacional Laguna	4
6	(Mexico) Ángel Pérez	Cruz Azul Lagunas	4
6	(Mexico) Alan Viurquez	Huracanes Izcalli	4
10	9 players		3

Source:Liga Premier FMF

==== Hat-tricks ====
Player	For	Against	Result	Date	Round
(Mexico) Álvaro Vidales^{4}	Racing de Veracruz B	Internacional Laguna	10 – 0 (H)	25 October 2026	1
(Mexico) Daniel Monsivaís	Ayense	Atlético Hidalgo	11 – 0 (H)	31 October 2026	6
(Mexico) Julián Payares	Racing de Veracruz B	Atlético Hidalgo	0 – 10 (A)	6 November 2026	7
(Mexico) Yair Martínez	Racing de Veracruz B	Atlético Hidalgo	0 – 10 (A)	6 November 2026	7
(Mexico) Fabián Razo	Gorilas	Internacional Laguna	5 – 0 (H)	15 November 2026	8

^{4} Player scored four goals
^{5} Player scored five goals
(H) – Home; (A) – Away

=== Attendance ===
Pos	Team	Total	High	Low	Average	Change
1	Ayense	790	470	320	395	+13.2%
2	Internacional Laguna	950	400	200	317	n/a^{3}
3	Atlético Celaya B	540	440	100	270	n/a^{3}
4	Cruz Azul Lagunas	500	300	200	250	n/a^{2}
5	Héroes de Zaci B	370	300	70	185	n/a^{3}
6	Gorilas	260	160	100	130	−59.9%
7	Racing de Veracruz B	100	100	100	100	−63.1%
8	Huracanes Izcalli	120	90	30	60	0.0%
9	Irapuato B	100	50	50	50	n/a^{3}
10	Atlético Hidalgo	0	0	0		NA^{1}
	League total	3,730	470	50	207	−29.4%

Source: Liga Premier FMF
Notes:
Only regular season listed
1: Team played Liga Premier – Serie A last season
2: Team played Liga TDP last season.
3: Team did not played last season.
4: Gorilas played last season in Juanacatlán

== See also ==
- 2026–27 Liga MX season
- 2026–27 Liga de Expansión MX season
- 2026–27 Primera Premier season
- 2026–27 Liga Premier A season
- 2026–27 Liga TDP season
