= List of football clubs in Mexico =

This is a list of football clubs in Mexico. Currently the governing body of football in Mexico is the Federación Mexicana de Fútbol (FMF), which is in charge of the Mexico national football team with all its categories and also all the professional divisions of the Mexican football league system, with the top level being the Liga MX. The current FMF was founded in 1927, has been an affiliate member of FIFA since 1929 and a founding member of CONCACAF since 1961.

== Liga MX ==
=== 2026–27 Liga MX clubs ===
Club	Home city	Stadium	Founded	Coefficient position last season	In division since
América	Mexico City	Estadio Azteca	1916	1st	1943–44
Atlante	Mexico City	Estadio Azteca	1916	Liga de Expansión MX	2026–27
Atlas	Guadalajara	Estadio Jalisco	1916	15th	1979–80
Atlético San Luis	San Luis Potosí	Libertad Financiera	2013	12th	2019–20
Cruz Azul	Mexico City	Estadio Azteca	1927	2nd	1964–65
Guadalajara	Guadalajara	Estadio Akron	1906	6th	1943–44
Juárez	Ciudad Juárez	Olímpico Benito Juárez	2015	13th	2019–20
León	León	Estadio León	1944	10th	2012–13
Monterrey	Monterrey	Estadio BBVA	1945	5th	1960–61
Necaxa	Aguascalientes	Estadio Victoria	1923	11th	2016–17
Pachuca	Pachuca	Estadio Hidalgo	1892	8th	1998–99
Puebla	Puebla	Estadio Cuauhtémoc	1944	18th	2007–08
Pumas UNAM	Mexico City	Olímpico Universitario	1954	7th	1962–63
Querétaro	Querétaro	Estadio Corregidora	1950	14th	2009–10
Santos Laguna	Torreón	Estadio Corona	1983	17th	1988–89
Tigres UANL	San Nicolás de los Garza	Estadio Universitario	1960	4th	1997–98
Tijuana	Tijuana	Estadio Caliente	2007	9th	2011–12
Toluca	Toluca	Nemesio Diez	1917	3rd	1953–54

== Liga de Expansión MX ==
=== 2026–27 Liga de Expansión MX clubs ===
Club	Home city	Stadium	Founded	Coefficient position last season	In division since
Alacranes de Durango	Durango	Francisco Zarco	1997	Serie A	2026–27
Alebrijes de Oaxaca	Oaxaca	Tecnológico de Oaxaca	2012	14th	2020–21
Atlético La Paz	La Paz	Estadio Guaycura	2022	11th	2022–23
Atlético Morelia	Morelia	Estadio Morelos	1924	10th	2020–21
Cancún	Cancún	Andrés Quintana Roo	2020	3rd	2020–21
Correcaminos UAT	Ciudad Victoria	Marte R. Gómez	1980	12th	2020–21
Cruz Azul Hidalgo	Ciudad Cooperativa	Estadio Refundación	1993	Defunct	2026–27
Dorados de Sinaloa	Mazatlán	El Encanto	2003	15th	2020–21
Jaiba Brava	Tampico & Ciudad Madero	Estadio Tamaulipas	1982	4th	2024–25
Leones Negros UdeG	Guadalajara	Estadio Jalisco	1970	2nd	2020–21
Mineros de Zacatecas	Zacatecas	Carlos Vega Villalba	2014	6th	2020–21
Piratas	Veracruz	Luis "Pirata" Fuente	2026	Debut season	2026–27
Tapatío	Zapopan	Estadio Akron	1973	8th	2020–21
Tepatitlán	Tepatitlán	Gregorio "Tepa" Gómez	1944	9th	2020–21
Tlaxcala	Tlaxcala	Estadio Tlahuicole	2014	13th	2020–21
Venados	Mérida	Carlos Iturralde	1988	5th	2020–21

== Liga Premier ==
=== 2026–27 Primera Premier clubs ===
Club	Home city	Stadium	Founded
Group 1
Cordobés	Cuautitlán	Los Pinos	2022
Irapuato	Irapuato	Sergio León Chávez	1911
La Piedad	La Piedad	Juan N. López	1951
Lobos ULMX	Celaya	Miguel Alemán Valdés	2021
Los Cabos United	Cabo San Lucas	Don Koll	2022
Purépechas	Morelia	Venustiano Carranza	2021
Tigres de Álica	Tepic	Nicolás Álvarez Ortega	2021
Tritones Vallarta	Puerto Vallarta	Juan N. López	2021
Zacatepec	Xochitepec	Mariano Matamoros	1948
Group 2
Atlético Celaya	Celaya	Miguel Alemán Valdés	1994
Chapulineros de Oaxaca	San Jerónimo Tlacochahuaya	Independiente MRCI	1983
Deportiva Venados	Tamanché	Alonso Diego Molina	2014
Inter Playa del Carmen	Playa del Carmen	Mario Villanueva Madrid	1999
Jaguares	Tuxtla Gutiérrez	Víctor Manuel Reyna	2002
Montañeses	Orizaba	Estadio Socum	2021
Pioneros de Cancún	Cancún	Cancún 86	1984
Racing de Veracruz	San Juan Bautista Tuxtepec	Gustavo Pacheco Villaseñor	2023
Tapachula Soconusco	Tapachula	Olímpico de Tapachula	2023

=== 2026–27 Liga Premier A clubs ===
Club	Home city	Stadium	Founded
Group 1
Correcaminos UAT Premier	Ciudad Victoria	Eugenio Alvizo Porras	1995
Guerreros de Autlán	Autlán	Unidad Deportiva Chapultepec	2002
Héroes de Zaci	Nuevo Laredo	Benito Juárez	2015
La Tribu de Ciudad Juárez	Ciudad Juárez	8 de Diciembre	2012
Mineros de Fresnillo	Zacatecas	Carlos Vega Villalba	2007
Real Apodaca	Apodaca	Centenario del Ejército Mexicano	2023
Saltillo Soccer F.C.	Saltillo	Olímpico de Saltillo	1995
Santiago	Allende	La Capilla	2017
Vaqueros Reynosa	Reynosa	Unidad Deportiva Solidaridad	2006
Zapotlanejo	Zapotlanejo	Miguel Hidalgo	2025
Group 2
Acámbaro	Acámbaro F.C.	Fray Salvador Rangel	2025
Artesanos Metepec	Metepec	Alarcón Hisojo	2022
Calor	Oaxtepec	Olímpico de Oaxtepec	2001
Cañoneros	Milpa Alta	Estadio Momoxco	2012
Ciervos	Chalco de Díaz Covarrubias	Estadio Arreola	2008
Delfines de Coatzacoalcos	Coatzacoalcos	Rafael Hernández Ochoa	1997
Dragones de Oaxaca	Oaxaca	Tecnológico de Oaxaca	2018
Guerreros del Pacífico	Acapulco	Unidad Deportiva Acapulco	2026
Halcones Negros	Texcoco de Mora	Municipal Claudio Suárez	2018
Real Refineros	Salamanca	Sección XXIV	2026

=== 2026–27 Liga Premier B clubs ===
Club	Home city	Stadium	Founded
Atlético Celaya B	Celaya	Miguel Alemán Valdés	2026
Atlético Hidalgo	Atitalaquia	Municipal de Atitalaquia	1996
Ayense	Ayotlán	Chino Rivas	1988
Cruz Azul Lagunas	Lagunas	La Laguna	1942
Gorilas	León	Instituto Oviedo Náutico	2016
Héroes de Zaci B	Ciudad Nezahualcóyotl	Metropolitano	?
Huracanes Izcalli	Milpa Alta	Estadio Momoxco	2021
Internacional Laguna	Gómez Palacio	Francisco Gómez Palacio	2026
Irapuato B	Irapuato	Sergio León Chávez	?
Racing de Veracruz B	San Juan Bautista Tuxtepec	Gustavo Pacheco Villaseñor	2025
