= 2026 Copa Conecta =

Tournament details
- Country: Mexico
- Dates: 20 January 2026 – 10 March 2026
- Teams: 32

Final positions
- Champions: FC Racing (1st title)
- Runners-up: Tigres de Álica TDP

Tournament statistics
- Matches played: 31
- Goals scored: 92 (2.97 per match)

The 2026 Copa Conecta was the 5th edition of the Copa Conecta, a knockout competition for Mexican football clubs from Liga Premier and Liga TDP.

The Copa Conecta is an official Mexican tournament that was created in 2021 with the aim of providing a greater opportunity for development to the football players of the Liga Premier and Liga TDP teams.

== Qualified teams ==
2 invited teams from Serie A.

- Racing de Veracruz
- Sporting Canamy

10 member teams from the Serie B.

- Artesanos Metepec
- Gorilas de Juanacatlán
- F.C. Racing
- Poza Rica
- Acámbaro
- Dragones de Oaxaca
- Aguacateros CDU
- Ayense
- Huracanes Izcalli
- Caja Oblatos

Teams classified at the first place of the 17 groups of the Liga TDP and the top 3 classified in the league coefficient table.

- Pioneros Junior (Liga TDP – Group 1)
- Lechuzas UPGCH (Liga TDP – Group 2)
- Delfines de Coatzacoalcos (Liga TDP – Group 3)
- PDLA (Liga TDP – Group 4)
- Aztecas AMF Soccer (Liga TDP – Group 5)
- CARSAF (Liga TDP – Group 6) (Note: Franchise loan from Azucareros de Tezonapa)
- Orishas Tepeji (Liga TDP – Group 7)
- Águilas UAGro (Liga TDP – Group 8)
- Bombarderos de Tecámac (Liga TDP – Group 9)
- Titanes de Querétaro (Liga TDP – Group 10)
- Atlético Morelia – UMSNH (Liga TDP – Group 11)
- León GEN (Liga TDP – Group 12)
- Tecos TDP (Liga TDP – Group 13)
- Elite Azteca (Note: Franchise loan from Volcanes de Colima) (Liga TDP – Group 14)
- Tigres de Álica TDP (Liga TDP – Group 15)
- Santiago TDP (Liga TDP – Group 16)
- La Tribu de Juárez (Liga TDP – Group 17)
- Racing de Veracruz TDP (Liga TDP – Coefficient)
- Diablos Tesistán (Liga TDP – Coefficient)
- Yautepec (Liga TDP – Coefficient)

== Bracket ==
Round of 32
Tigres de Álica TDP	4
Tecos TDP	1
Santiago TDP	2 (2)
La Tribu de Juárez (p)	2 (4)
Elite Azteca (p)	2 (5)
Gorilas de Juanacatlán	2 (3)
León GEN	0
Ayense	7
Atlético Morelia – UMSNH	1
Aguacateros CDU	2
Diablos Tesistán	2 (1)
Caja Oblatos (p)	2 (3)
Titanes de Querétaro	3
Acámbaro	5
Artesanos Metepec	0
Orishas Tepeji	1
Águilas UAGro (p)	0 (3)
CARSAF	0 (2)
Yautepec	0
Sporting Canamy	2
Bombarderos de Tecámac	2 (2)
Poza Rica (p)	2 (3)
Aztecas AMF Soccer	0 (1)
Huracanes Izcalli (p)	0 (3)
Racing de Veracruz TDP	0
FC Racing	1
Lechuzas UPGCH	0
Dragones de Oaxaca	1
Delfines de Coatzacoalcos	1
PDLA	0
Pioneros Junior	0
Racing de Veracruz	3

Round of 16
Tigres de Álica TDP (p)	1 (4)
La Tribu de Juárez	1 (3)
Elite Azteca	0
Ayense	2
Aguacateros CDU	2
Caja Oblatos	1
Acámbaro	6
Orishas Tepeji	1
Águilas UAGro (p)	3 (5)
Sporting Canamy	3 (4)
Poza Rica (p)	0 (4)
Huracanes Izcalli	0 (3)
FC Racing	3
Dragones de Oaxaca	1
Delfines de Coatzacoalcos	1
Racing de Veracruz	2

Quarter–finals
Tigres de Álica TDP (p)	2 (5)
Ayense	2 (4)
Aguacateros CDU	3
Acámbaro	0
Águilas UAGro	3
Poza Rica	1
FC Racing (p)	1 (3)
Racing de Veracruz	1 (1)

Semi–finals
Tigres de Álica TDP (p)	0 (4)
Aguacateros CDU	0 (3)
Águilas UAGro	1 (4)
FC Racing (p)	1 (5)

Final
Tigres de Álica TDP	0
FC Racing	1

== Matches ==
=== Round of 32 ===
The matches were played on 20 and 21 January 2026.

Team 1	Score	Team 2
Pioneros Junior	0–3	Racing de Veracruz
Lechuzas UPGCH	0–1	Dragones de Oaxaca
Delfines de Coatzacoalcos	1–0	PDLA
Racing de Veracruz TDP	0–1	FC Racing
Aztecas AMF Soccer	0–0 (1–3)	(p) Huracanes Izcalli
Águilas UAGro (p)	0–0 (3–2)	CARSAF
Yautepec	0–2	Sporting Canamy
Artesanos Metepec	0–1	Orishas Tepeji
Bombarderos de Tecámac	2–2 (2–3)	(p) Poza Rica
Titanes de Querétaro	3–5	Acámbaro
Atlético Morelia – UMSNH	1–2	Aguacateros CDU
León GEN	0–7	Ayense
Diablos Tesistán	2–2 (1–3)	(p) Caja Oblatos
Elite Azteca (p)	2–2 (5–3)	Gorilas de Juanacatlán
Tigres de Álica TDP	4–1	Tecos TDP
Santiago TDP	2–2 (2–4)	(p) La Tribu de Juárez

Matches

20 January 2026	Santiago TDP	2–2 (2–4 p)	La Tribu de Juárez	Santiago, Nuevo León
11:00 CST (UTC−6)	Berber 12'; Domínguez 66'	Report	González 33'; Mena 57'	Stadium: Cancha FCD El Barrial; Attendance: 50; Referee: Juan Daniel Peña

20 January 2026	Aztecas AMF Soccer	0–0 (1–3 p)	Huracanes Izcalli	Mexico City
11:00 CST (UTC−6)		Report		Stadium: Deportivo Francisco Zarco, field 1 Attendance: 200; Referee: Mauricio Roque Trejo

20 January 2026	Tigres de Álica TDP	4–1	Tecos TDP	Tepic, Nayarit
14:00 MST (UTC−7)	Maldonado 16', 90'; Tirado 36', 73'	Report	Torres 46'	Stadium: Estadio Hilario "Diablo" Díaz; Attendance: 100; Referee: Mario Velázquez Román

20 January 2026	Pioneros Junior	0–3	Racing de Veracruz	Cancún, Quintana Roo
15:00 EST (UTC−5)		Report	García 4'; Espinosa 27'; I. Hernández 87'	Stadium: Estadio Cancún 86; Attendance: 400; Referee: Luis Fernando García

20 January 2026	Bombarderos de Tecámac	2–2 (2–3 p)	Poza Rica	Tecámac, State of Mexico
15:00 CST (UTC−6)	Tlecuitl 14'; Bello 43'	Report	Maya 54'; Zamora 71'	Stadium: Deportivo Sierra Hermosa; Attendance: 500; Referee: Carlos Alberto Casas

20 January 2026	Águilas UAGro	0–0 (3–2 p)	CARSAF	Chilpancingo, Guerrero
15:00 CST (UTC−6)		Report		Stadium: Estadio Universitario UAGro; Attendance: 100; Referee: Edwin Alejandro Marín

20 January 2026	Lechuzas UPGCH	0–1	Dragones de Oaxaca	Tuxtla Gutiérrez, Chiapas
15:00 CST (UTC−6)		Report	Ayuzo 79'	Stadium: Estadio Flor de Sospó; Attendance: 250; Referee: Elmer Leonardo Alegría

20 January 2026	Elite Azteca	2–2 (5–3 p)	Gorilas de Juanacatlán	Zapopan, Jalisco
20:00 CST (UTC−6)	Rivera 10'; Cabrera 28'	Report	Pacheco 46'; Dávalos 75'	Stadium: Centro de Alto Rendimiento Tapatíos; Attendance: 100; Referee: Ulises Ramsés Quintero

20 January 2026	Racing de Veracruz TDP	0–1	FC Racing	Boca del Río, Veracruz
20:00 CST (UTC−6)		Report	Martín del Campo 64'	Stadium: Unidad Deportiva Hugo Sánchez; Attendance: 306; Referee: Brayan Daniel Escobar

21 January 2026	León GEN	0–7	Ayense	Lagos de Moreno, Jalisco
10:00 CST (UTC−6)		Report	Anderson 5', 60', 71', 82'; Tinoco 27'; Monsivaís 73', 85'	Stadium: Complejo GEN La Esmeralda; Attendance: 50; Referee: Gerardo Abraham García

21 January 2026	Diablos Tesistán	2–2 (1–3 p)	Caja Oblatos	Zapopan, Jalisco
12:00 CST (UTC−6)	Mendoza 18', 47'	Report	A. González 13'; Moreno 84'	Stadium: Deportivo Diablos Tesistán; Attendance: 100; Referee: Héctor Eduardo Granados

21 January 2026	Artesanos Metepec	0–1	Orishas Tepeji	Metepec, State of Mexico
14:00 CST (UTC−6)		Report	Ávila 67'	Stadium: Unidad Deportiva Alarcón Hisojo; Attendance: 50; Referee: Luis Felipe Villafuerte

21 January 2026	Titanes de Querétaro	3–5	Acámbaro	San José Iturbide, Guanajuato
15:00 CST (UTC−6)	Galván 1'; Luna 25'; Contreras 61'	Report	E. Martínez 42'; Olvera 69'; Navarrete 77', 79'; Barajas 90'	Stadium: Unidad Deportiva San José Iturbide; Attendance: 50; Referee: Pablo Eduardo Benítez

21 January 2026	Delfines de Coatzacoalcos	1–0	PDLA	Coatzacoalcos, Veracruz
15:00 CST (UTC−6)	Aguilar 60'	Report		Stadium: Estadio Rafael Hernández Ochoa; Attendance: 200; Referee: Luis Enrique Menéndez

21 January 2026	Atlético Morelia – UMSNH	1–2	Aguacateros CDU	Morelia, Michoacán
16:00 CST (UTC−6)	Castro 18'	Report	Melgoza 47'; Rocha 72'	Stadium: Estadio Universitario UMSNH; Attendance: 200; Referee: Manuel Aquino Nepomuceno

21 January 2026	Yautepec	0–2	Sporting Canamy	Yautepec, Morelos
18:00 CST (UTC−6)		Report	Aguilar 21'; Berrio 61'	Stadium: Campo Deportivo Yautepec; Attendance: 350; Referee: Héctor Morales Leal

=== Round of 16 ===
The matches were played on 3 and 4 February 2026.

Team 1	Score	Team 2
FC Racing	3–1	Dragones de Oaxaca
Delfines de Coatzacoalcos	1–2	Racing de Veracruz
Poza Rica (p)	0–0 (4–3)	Huracanes Izcalli
Águilas UAGro (p)	3–3 (5–4)	Sporting Canamy
Acámbaro	6–1	Orishas Tepeji
Aguacateros CDU	2–1	Caja Oblatos
Elite Azteca	0–2	Ayense
Tigres de Álica TDP (p)	1–1 (4–3)	La Tribu de Juárez

Matches

3 February 2026	Tigres de Álica TDP	1–1 (4–3 p)	La Tribu de Juárez	Tepic, Nayarit
14:00 MST (UTC−7)	Tirado 52'	Report	Grijalva 42'	Stadium: Estadio Hilario "Diablo" Díaz; Attendance: 100; Referee: Bryan Alan Reyes

3 February 2026	Águilas UAGro	3–3 (5–4 p)	Sporting Canamy	Chilpancingo, Guerrero
15:00 CST (UTC−6)	Ramírez 4' (own); Oliveros 36'; Martínez 45'	Report	Aguilar 13', 75'; Arreola 59'	Stadium: Estadio Universitario UAGro; Attendance: 200; Referee: Carlos Alberto Casas

4 February 2026	Acámbaro	6–1	Orishas Tepeji	Acámbaro, Guanajuato
15:00 CST (UTC−6)	Martínez 5', 65'; Pineda 55'; Domínguez 60', 88'; Navarrete 76'	Report	Romero 36'	Stadium: Estadio Fray Salvador Rangel; Attendance: 120; Referee: Pedro Alberto Reyes

4 February 2026	Delfines de Coatzacoalcos	1–2	Racing de Veracruz	Coatzacoalcos, Veracruz
15:00 CST (UTC−6)	Castillo 48'	Report	Carballo 32'; Ocón 35'	Stadium: Estadio Rafael Hernández Ochoa; Attendance: 2,000; Referee: Brian Jair Jiménez

4 February 2026	Aguacateros CDU	2–1	Caja Oblatos	Uruapan, Michoacán
15:30 CST (UTC−6)	Quezada 18'; Melgoza 90'	Report	Gollaz 75'	Stadium: Unidad Deportiva Hermanos López Rayón; Attendance: 400; Referee: Axel Jesús Ibares

4 February 2026	Poza Rica	0–0 (4–3 p)	Huracanes Izcalli	Poza Rica, Veracruz
17:00 CST (UTC−6)		Report		Stadium: Estadio Heriberto Jara Corona; Attendance: 400; Referee: Israel de Jesús Mejía

4 February 2026	Elite Azteca	0–2	Ayense	Zapopan, Jalisco
20:00 CST (UTC−6)		Report	Sosa 24', 48'	Stadium: Centro de Alto Rendimiento Tapatíos; Attendance: 100; Referee: Keven Iván Pérez

4 February 2026	FC Racing	3–1	Dragones de Oaxaca	Boca del Río, Veracruz
21:00 CST (UTC−6)	Suárez 45'; Buitimea 74'; Haro 86'	Report	Romero 90'	Stadium: Unidad Deportiva Hugo Sánchez; Attendance: 131; Referee: Héctor Iván Castro

=== Quarter–finals ===
The matches were played on 17 and 18 February 2026.

Team 1	Score	Team 2
Águilas UAGro	3–1	Poza Rica
FC Racing (p)	1–1 (3–1)	Racing de Veracruz
Aguacateros CDU	3–0	Acámbaro
Tigres de Álica TDP	2–2 (5–4)	Ayense

Matches

17 February 2026	Águilas UAGro	3–1	Poza Rica	Chilpancingo, Guerrero
15:00 CST (UTC−6)	Oliveros 45', 89'; Martínez 74'	Report	Zamora 2'	Stadium: Estadio Universitario UAGro; Attendance: 800; Referee: Edwin Alejandro Marín

17 February 2026	FC Racing	1–1 (3–1 p)	Racing de Veracruz	Boca del Río, Veracruz
20:00 CST (UTC−6)	Birche 17'	Report	Ruiz 77'	Stadium: Unidad Deportiva Hugo Sánchez; Attendance: 575; Referee: Israel de Jesús Mejía

18 February 2026	Tigres de Álica TDP	2–2 (5–4 p)	Ayense	Tepic, Nayarit
14:00 MST (UTC−7)	Durán 43'; Oviedo 47'	Report	Tinoco 31', 51'	Stadium: Estadio Hilario "Diablo" Díaz; Attendance: 150; Referee: Keven Iván Pérez

18 February 2026	Aguacateros CDU	3–0	Acámbaro	Uruapan, Michoacán
15:30 CST (UTC−6)	Ávila 6', 42', 47'	Report		Stadium: Unidad Deportiva Hermanos López Rayón; Attendance: 400; Referee: Mauricio Roque Trejo

=== Semi–finals ===
The matches were played on 3 and 4 March 2026.

Team 1	Score	Team 2
Águilas UAGro	1–1 (4–5)	(p) FC Racing
Tigres de Álica TDP (p)	0–0 (4–3)	Aguacateros CDU

Matches

3 March 2026	Águilas UAGro	1–1 (4–5 p)	FC Racing	Chilpancingo, Guerrero
15:00 CST (UTC−6)	Acosta 25'	Report	González 29'	Stadium: Estadio Universitario UAGro; Attendance: 700; Referee: Carlos Alberto Casas

4 March 2026	Tigres de Álica TDP	0–0 (4–3 p)	Aguacateros CDU	Tepic, Nayarit
14:00 MST (UTC−7)		Report		Stadium: Estadio Hilario "Diablo" Díaz; Attendance: 200; Referee: Bryan Alan Reyes

=== Final ===
The match was played on 10 March 2026.

Team 1	Score	Team 2
Tigres de Álica TDP	0–1	FC Racing

10 March 2026	Tigres de Álica TDP	0–1	FC Racing	Tepic, Nayarit
11:00 MST (UTC−7)		Report	González 45'	Stadium: Estadio Hilario "Diablo" Díaz; Attendance: 1,000; Referee: Héctor Salvador Solorio

== See also ==
- 2025–26 Serie A de México season
- 2025–26 Serie B de México season
- 2025–26 Liga TDP season
