= 2026–27 Primera Premier season =

Primera Premier
- Season: 2026–27
- Matches: 101
- Goals: 279 (2.76 per match)
- Top goalscorer: David García (13 goals)
- Biggest home win: Racing de Veracruz 5–1 Chapulineros de Oaxaca (5 September 2026)
- Biggest away win: Tapachula 0–4 Racing de Veracruz (29 August 2026); Inter Playa del Carmen 0–4 Pioneros de Cancún (7 September 2026)
- Highest scoring: Racing de Veracruz 5–1 Chapulineros de Oaxaca (5 September 2026)
- Longest winning run: 10 matches Irapuato
- Longest unbeaten run: 10 matches Irapuato; Racing de Veracruz
- Longest winless run: 6 matches Tritones Vallarta
- Longest losing run: 4 matches Purépechas; Tapachula
- Highest attendance: 8,700; Atlético Celaya vs. Tapachula (5 September 2026)
- Lowest attendance: 30; Tritones Vallarta vs. Zacatepec (11 September 2026)
- Total attendance: 97,283
- Average attendance: 2,027
- Stats are from the regular season only

The 2026–27 Primera Premier season is part of the third-tier football league of Mexico. The tournament began on 28 August 2026 and will finish on May 2027.

This is the inaugural season of this branch of the Liga Premier de México, Primera Premier became its top branch, established with the sole aim of including teams eligible for promotion to the Liga de Expansión MX.

== Changes ==
=== Offseason ===
- On 27 June 2026, Irapuato returned to the Liga Premier after a year in the Liga de Expansión, as the club was forced to start a new project following the conflict between the civil association that owns the name and brand rights and the company that owned the club franchise between 2023 and 2026.
- On 23 July 2026, Celaya F.C. was dissolved to grant its franchise in the Liga Premier to the refounding of Atlético Celaya.
- On 1 August 2026, Atlético Celaya, Chapulineros de Oaxaca, Cordobés, Deportiva Venados, Inter Playa del Carmen, Jaguares, La Piedad, Lobos ULMX, Los Cabos United, Montañeses, Pioneros de Cancún, Racing de Veracruz, Tapachula, Tigres de Álica, Tritones Vallarta and Zacatepec were promoted from Liga Premier A as the teams in that branch have the best conditions to qualify for promotion to Liga de Expansión MX.
- On 10 August 2026, H2O Purépechas joined the league taking the place of Halcones F.C., which had been announced as a founding club of the league. On 27 August the team was renamed Purépechas F.C.
- On 14 August 2026, Racing de Veracruz was relocated from Boca del Río, Veracruz to San Juan Bautista Tuxtepec, Oaxaca because the club was left without a stadium in Veracruz following the closure of the Unidad Deportiva Hugo Sánchez in February 2026.
- On 18 August 2026, Tritones Vallarta was temporarily relocated to La Piedad, Michoacán, due to the construction of its new stadium in Puerto Vallarta.

=== On–season ===
- On 28 October 2026, Tritones Vallarta was relocated from La Piedad to Tomatlán, Jalisco, due to logistical reasons and the fact that this location is closer to the club’s city, pending the completion of the team’s new stadium in Puerto Vallarta.
Locations clubs in the 2026–27 Primera Premier season.
Group 1
Group 2

== Teams ==
The member clubs of the Primera Premier for the 2026–27 season are listed as follows.

=== Group 1 ===
Club	Manager	City	Stadium	Capacity
Cordobés	(Mexico) Alejandro Estrada	Cuautitlán	Los Pinos	5,000
Irapuato (Note: Team affiliated with Pachuca.)	(Uruguay) Luis Almada	Irapuato	Sergio León Chávez	25,000
La Piedad	(Mexico) Gastón Obledo	La Piedad	Juan N. López	13,356
Lobos ULMX	(Colombia) Wilder Mosquera	Celaya	Miguel Alemán Valdés	23,182
Los Cabos United	(Mexico) Edson Alvarado	Los Cabos	Complejo Don Koll	3,500
Purépechas	(Mexico) Efrén Galván	Morelia	Venustiano Carranza	17,600
Tigres de Álica	(Mexico) Irving Rubirosa	Tepic	Nicolás Álvarez Ortega	12,495
Tritones Vallarta	(Mexico) Ricardo Jiménez	Puerto Vallarta	TBA (Note: The team played the first two months of the season at Estadio Juan N. López in La Piedad, Michoacán, however in November 2026 they moved to the Cancha Municipal in Tomatlán, Jalisco, due to the construction of the new Tritones stadium in Puerto Vallarta)	TBA
Zacatepec	(Mexico) Rowan Vargas	Xochitepec	Mariano Matamoros	16,000

=== Group 2 ===
Club	Manager	City	Stadium	Capacity
Atlético Celaya	(Mexico) Luis Fernando Soto	Celaya	Miguel Alemán Valdés	23,182
Chapulineros de Oaxaca	(Mexico) Carlos Ayala	San Jerónimo Tlacochahuaya	Independiente MRCI	6,000
Deportiva Venados	(Mexico) Alfredo García Salmones	Tamanché	Alonso Diego Molina	2,500
Inter Playa del Carmen	(Mexico) José Luis Trejo	Playa del Carmen	Unidad Deportiva Mario Villanueva Madrid	7,500
Jaguares	(Peru) Jorge Espejo	Tuxtla Gutiérrez	Víctor Manuel Reyna	29,001
Montañeses	(Mexico) Víctor Medina	Orizaba	Socum	7,000
Pioneros de Cancún	(Mexico) Gerardo Castillo	Cancún	Cancún 86	6,390
Racing de Veracruz	(Mexico) Héctor Altamirano	San Juan Bautista Tuxtepec	Gustavo Pacheco Villaseñor	15,000
Tapachula	(Mexico) Diego Mazariegos	Tapachula	Olímpico de Tapachula	18,017

=== Regular season ===
==== Group 1 ====
Pos	Team	Pld	W	D	L	GF	GA	GD	BP	Pts	Qualification or relegation
1	Irapuato	12	11	0	1	26	9	+17	2	35	Advance to Liguilla (Note: The first 4 places in the two groups qualify for the Liguilla.)
2	Tigres de Álica	12	5	4	3	20	13	+7	0	19	Advance to Liguilla
3	Lobos ULMX	12	5	2	5	15	16	−1	1	18	Advance to Liguilla
4	Zacatepec	12	4	3	5	13	23	−10	1	16	Advance to Liguilla
5	La Piedad	11	4	2	5	15	18	−3	1	15	
6	Cordobés	12	3	4	5	10	14	−4	2	15	
7	Los Cabos United	12	4	1	7	11	16	−5	0	13	
8	Tritones Vallarta	12	2	4	6	11	16	−5	0	10	
9	Purépechas	12	2	3	7	7	14	−7	0	9	

Updated to match(es) played on 21 November 2026. Source: Liga Premier FMF

===== Positions by round =====
Qualification to Quarter–finals
Last place in table

Team ╲ Round	1	2	3	4	5	6	7	8	9	10	11	12	13	14	15	16	17	18	19	20	21	22	23	24	25	26	27	28
Irapuato	2	1	1	1	1	1†	1	1	1	1	1	1	1	1														
Tigres de Álica	1	3	3	3	5	3	3	2	3	2	2	2		†														
Zacatepec	9	4	4	4	2	4	4†	4	4	5	3	3																
Lobos ULMX	6†	7	9	6	7	7	8	7	5	4	4	4																
La Piedad	3	2	2	2	3†	2	2	3	2	3	5	5																
Cordobés	4	5	8	8†	8	6	6	6	7	6	6	6																
Los Cabos United	7	9	5	5	4	5	5	5†	6	7	7	7																
Tritones Vallarta	8	8†	6	7	6	8	9	9	9	9	9	8																
Purépechas	4	6	7†	9	9	9	7	8	8	8	8	9																

Updated to match(es) played on 16 November 2026. Source: Liga Premier FMF
Notes: † indicates team rested that round

==== Group 2 ====
Pos	Team	Pld	W	D	L	GF	GA	GD	BP	Pts	Qualification or relegation
1	Racing de Veracruz	12	8	3	1	29	10	+19	4	31	Advance to Liguilla (Note: The first 4 places in the two groups qualify for the Liguilla.)
2	Atlético Celaya	12	7	3	2	25	11	+14	3	27	Advance to Liguilla
3	Pioneros de Cancún	12	6	2	4	21	12	+9	3	23	Advance to Liguilla
4	Jaguares	12	4	7	1	13	11	+2	1	20	Advance to Liguilla
5	Deportiva Venados	11	4	4	3	22	19	+3	2	18	
6	Montañeses	12	4	2	6	17	21	−4	2	16	
7	Chapulineros de Oaxaca	12	4	4	4	15	19	−4	0	16	
8	Inter Playa del Carmen	12	3	2	7	12	21	−9	0	11	
9	Tapachula	12	2	0	10	13	32	−19	0	6	

Updated to match(es) played on 21 November 2026. Source: Liga Premier FMF

===== Positions by round =====
Qualification to Quarter–finals
Last place in table

Team ╲ Round	1	2	3	4	5	6	7	8	9	10	11	12	13	14	15	16	17	18	19	20	21	22	23	24	25	26	27	28
Racing de Veracruz	1	1	1	1	1	1†	2	1	1	1	1	1																
Atlético Celaya	2	2	2	2	2	3	3	3†	3	3	3	2																
Pioneros	8	3	4†	3	3	2	1	2	2	2	2	3																
Deportiva Venados	4	6†	3	4	4	5	6	5	5	5	5	4																
Jaguares	3	4	5	5†	6	4	4	4	4	4	4	5																
Montañeses	5	5	6	6	5	6	5	6	7	7	7	6		†														
Chapulineros	7	8	8	8	8	7	7†	7	6	6	6	7																
Inter Playa	6†	7	9	9	9	8	8	8	9	8	8	8																
Tapachula	9	9	7	7	7†	9	9	9	8	9	9	9																

Updated to match(es) played on 16 November 2026. Source: Liga Premier FMF
Notes: † indicates team rested that round

==== League table ====
Pos	Team	Pld	W	D	L	GF	GA	GD	BP	Pts	Qualification or relegation
1	Irapuato	12	11	0	1	26	9	+17	2	35	Advance to Liguilla (Note: The first 4 places in the two groups qualify for the Liguilla.)
2	Racing de Veracruz	12	8	3	1	29	10	+19	4	31	Advance to Liguilla
3	Atlético Celaya	12	7	3	2	25	11	+14	3	27	Advance to Liguilla
4	Pioneros de Cancún	12	6	2	4	21	12	+9	3	23	Advance to Liguilla
5	Jaguares	12	4	7	1	13	11	+2	1	20	Advance to Liguilla
6	Tigres de Álica	12	5	4	3	20	13	+7	0	19	Advance to Liguilla
7	Deportiva Venados	11	4	4	3	22	19	+3	2	18	
8	Lobos ULMX	12	5	2	5	15	16	−1	1	18	Advance to Liguilla
9	Montañeses	12	4	2	6	17	21	−4	2	16	
10	Chapulineros de Oaxaca	12	4	4	4	15	19	−4	0	16	
11	Zacatepec	12	4	3	5	13	23	−10	1	16	Advance to Liguilla
12	La Piedad	11	4	2	5	15	18	−3	1	15	
13	Cordobés	12	3	4	5	10	14	−4	2	15	
14	Los Cabos United	12	4	1	7	11	16	−5	0	13	
15	Inter Playa del Carmen	12	3	2	7	12	21	−9	0	11	
16	Tritones Vallarta	12	2	4	6	11	16	−5	0	10	
17	Purépechas	12	2	3	7	7	14	−7	0	9	
18	Tapachula	12	2	0	10	13	32	−19	0	6	Relegation to Liga Premier A (Note: The worst team of the regular season will be relegated to Liga Premier A, the intermediate branch of the Liga Premier.)

Updated to match(es) played on 21 November 2026. Source: Liga Premier FMF

==== Results ====
Each team will play 26 matches during the season: 16 against their group rivals, playing both home and away, and ten matches against opponents from the other group.

Home \ Away	CEL	CHA	COR	DVE	INP	IRA	JAG	LPD	ULM	LCU	MON	PIO	PUR	RVE	TAP	TIG	TRV	ZAC
Atlético Celaya	—		2–1				0–1	—	—		2–1		—		2–0	1–1	—	5–0
Chapulineros de Oaxaca	1–1	—	1–1			—	0–1	—			2–1	1–3	2–0			—	2–1	—
Cordobés			—	—		0–3	2–2	1–2			—	1–0		—	—	1–0		0–1
Deportiva Venados	2–2		—	—			2–0			—		1–4	—			3–1	1–1	—
Inter Playa del Carmen		1–1	0–0	3–1	—	1–4			1–2	—		0–4		0–1		—	—	—
Irapuato	1–2	—		2–1		—	—		3–0	2–1	—	—				2–1	1–0	2–0
Jaguares					1–0	—	—	2–2	—	1–0	2–2		1–1	1–1			—	—
La Piedad	—	—			1–2	2–3		—		2–1	—		3–0	0–2	—			
Lobos ULMX	—	1–1	2–0	1–3			—		—	1–2				—	—		2–1	
Los Cabos United	1–4	2–0	0–2	—	—					—		—			—	1–2	1–0	
Montañeses			—	1–1	3–2	—		—	0–3	2–1	—			1–3	2–1		—	
Pioneros de Cancún	0–3					—	0–0	1–0	0–1	—	2–1	—	—		5–1	—		0–0
Purépechas	—		1–1	—	1–2				2–0	0–1	2–1	—	—	—				
Racing de Veracruz	2–1	5–1	—	3–3		0–1			—	0–0			—	—		—	3–1	
Tapachula		2–3	—	1–4	2–0	1–2		—	—	—			1–0	0–4	—			2–4
Tigres de Álica		—			—		1–1	4–0	1–1			—	1–0	—	4–1	—	1–1	3–1
Tritones Vallarta	—				—		—	0–1			—	3–2	0–0	—	2–1		—	1–1
Zacatepec		—		—	—		—	2–2	2–1		0–2		1–0	1–5				—

Updated to match(es) played on 21 November 2026. Source: Liga Premier FMF
Legend: Blue = home team win; Yellow = draw; Red = away team win.

=== Regular season statistics ===
==== Top goalscorers ====
Players sorted first by goals scored, then by last name.

Rank	Player	Club	Goals
1	(Mexico) David García	Racing de Veracruz	13
2	(Mexico) Francisco Castañeda	Deportiva Venados	11
3	(Mexico) Ronaldo Rubio	Pioneros de Cancún	10
4	(Mexico) Alejandro Salazar	Tigres de Álica	8
5	(Mexico) Luis Araujo	Irapuato	5
5	(Mexico) Heriberto de la Rosa	Irapuato	5
5	(Mexico) Gerardo Gil	Atlético Celaya	5
5	(Paraguay) Bruno Recalde	Atlético Celaya	5
9	(Mexico) Arturo Hernández	Irapuato	4
9	(Colombia) Luis Mosquera	Pioneros de Cancún	4
9	(Mexico) Josué Muñoz	La Piedad	4
9	(Uruguay) Máximo Plada	Montañeses	4
9	(Mexico) Jesús Talavera	Tigres de Álica	4

Source:Liga Premier FMF

==== Hat-tricks ====
Player	For	Against	Result	Date	Round

^{4} Player scored four goals
^{5} Player scored five goals
(H) – Home; (A) – Away

=== Attendance ===
Pos	Team	Total	High	Low	Average	Change
1	Racing de Veracruz	13,775	8,175	5,600	6,888	+99.0%^{2}
2	Atlético Celaya	19,241	8,700	4,622	6,414	+14.0%
3	Jaguares	11,399	8,656	2,743	5,700	+139.3%
4	Irapuato	15,000	5,500	4,500	5,000	+5.3%^{1}
5	Montañeses	8,200	4,000	1,200	2,733	−10.7%
6	La Piedad	4,800	4,000	800	2,400	+319.6%
7	Inter Playa del Carmen	4,186	3,188	885	1,690	−46.8%
8	Tigres de Álica	5,600	3,000	400	1,400	+224.1%
9	Tapachula Soconusco	2,583	1,208	575	861	−38.8%
10	Zacatepec	2,348	855	738	783	+246.5%
11	Purépechas	1,323	823	500	662	+50.5%^{3}
12	Chapulineros de Oaxaca	1,900	1,000	300	633	+115.3%
13	Deportiva Venados	1,238	762	476	619	+48.8%
14	Lobos ULMX	1,088	682	406	544	−14.5%
15	Cordobés	1,500	750	350	500	+62.9%
16	Pioneros de Cancún	1,364	600	350	455	−26.0%
17	Los Cabos United	723	350	100	241	−62.7%
18	Tritones Vallarta	130	100	30	65	−67.0%^{4}
	League total	97,283	8,700	30	2,027	+135.2%

Source: Liga Premier FMF
Notes:
Only regular season listed:
1: Irapuato played at the Liga de Expansión MX last season.
2: Racing de Veracruz played last season at Boca del Río.
3: Purépechas played last season as Halcones in Uruapan.
4: Tritones Vallarta played last season at Puerto Vallarta.

== Liguilla ==
The four best teams of each group play two games against each other on a home-and-away basis. The higher seeded teams play on their home field during the second leg. The winner of each match up is determined by aggregate score. In the quarterfinals and semifinals, if the two teams are tied on aggregate the higher seeded team advances. In the final, if the two teams are tied after both legs, the match goes to extra time and, if necessary, a penalty shoot-out.

== See also ==
- 2026–27 Liga MX season
- 2026–27 Liga de Expansión MX season
- 2026–27 Liga Premier A season
- 2026–27 Liga Premier B season
- 2026–27 Liga TDP season
