= 2025–26 Serie B de México season =

Serie B de México
- Season: 2025–26
- Champions: Artesanos Metepec (1st title)
- Promoted: Dragones de Oaxaca; Gorilas de Juanacatlán
- Matches: 90
- Goals: 253 (2.81 per match)
- Top goalscorer: Sergio Vázquez (15 goals)
- Biggest home win: Artesanos Metepec 7–0 Poza Rica (4 October 2025)
- Biggest away win: Huracanes Izcalli 3–8 Acámbaro (7 March 2026)
- Highest scoring: Huracanes Izcalli 3–8 Acámbaro (7 March 2026)
- Longest winning run: 7 matches Artesanos Metepec
- Longest unbeaten run: 9 matches Artesanos Metepec
- Longest winless run: 13 matches Caja Oblatos
- Longest losing run: 5 matches Caja Oblatos; Huracanes Izcalli
- Highest attendance: 1,347; Dragones de Oaxaca vs. Caja Oblatos (2 February 2026)
- Lowest attendance: 32; Huracanes Izcalli vs. Poza Rica (15 November 2025)
- Total attendance: 26,370
- Average attendance: 293
- Stats are from the regular season only

The 2025–26 Serie B de México season is part of the third-tier football league of Mexico. The tournament began on 22 August 2025 and finished on 18 April 2026.

== Changes ==
=== Off–season ===
- On May 3, 2025 Santiago was promoted from Serie B to Serie A.
- On May 31, 2025 Dragones de Oaxaca was promoted from Liga TDP to Serie B.
- On June 1, 2025 Gorilas de Juanacatlán was promoted from Liga TDP to Serie B.
- On June 8, 2025 Calor was relocated from San Juan de los Lagos, Jalisco to Reynosa, Tamaulipas. On June 27 the team was promoted to Serie A.
- On June 27, 2025, the league format was modified, the single-season tournament was reinstated after one year with two tournaments per season.
- On June 27, 2025 Cordobés was promoted from Serie B to Serie A.
- On June 27, 2025 CDM was relocated to Acámbaro, Guanajuato and renamed Acámbaro F.C.
- On June 27, 2025 F.C. Racing joined the league as an expansion team.
- On June 27, 2025 Real Zamora went on hiatus.
- On July 31, 2025 Aguacateros CDU returned to Serie B due to administrative decisions of the club.
- On July 31, 2025 Cañoneros and Ciervos were promoted to Serie A as expansion teams.

=== In–season ===
- Since week 5, Huracanes Izcalli was relocated from Cuautitlán Izcalli, State of Mexico, to Milpa Alta, Mexico City.

== Teams ==
Below are listed the member clubs of the Serie B for the 2025–26 season.

Location of teams in the 2025–26 Serie B

Club	Manager	City	Stadium	Capacity	Affiliate	Kit manufacturer	Shirt sponsor(s) front
Acámbaro	(Mexico) Francisco Tena	Acámbaro, Guanajuato	Fray Salvador Rangel	3,500	–	Joma	Azteca Zapaterías
Aguacateros CDU	(Mexico) Edgar Tolentino	Uruapan, Michoacán	Unidad Deportiva Hermanos López Rayón	5,000	Atlético Morelia	Keuka	Agromich, PFS, RIMSA, allfruits
Artesanos Metepec	(Mexico) Gustavo Contreras	Metepec, State of Mexico	Unidad Deportiva Alarcón Hisojo	2,000	–	JAG Sportswear	Metepec, Refaccionaria El Arbol, ACM, Fit&Go
Ayense	(Mexico) Enrique Pérez	Ayotlán, Jalisco	Chino Rivas	3,500	–	Romed	El Mexicano, La Legión
Caja Oblatos	(Mexico) Ángel Monares	Tonalá, Jalisco	Unidad Deportiva Revolución Mexicana	3,000	–	River	Caja Oblatos, Armstrong Safe
Dragones de Oaxaca	(Mexico) Jesús García	Oaxaca City, Oaxaca	Tecnológico de Oaxaca	14,950	–	Corsa	Ford Oaxaca
Gorilas de Juanacatlán	(Mexico) Damián Osorno	Juanacatlán, Jalisco	Club Juanacatlán	800	–	Obliqua	JR Logistic, La Cascada, TESA Transporte Empresarial
Huracanes Izcalli	(Mexico) Román Reyes	Milpa Alta, Mexico City	Momoxco	3,500	–	JAG Sportswear	Latinus Capital, Risval Corporation
Poza Rica	(Mexico) Alberto Segura	Poza Rica, Veracruz	Heriberto Jara Corona	10,000	–	Pirma	–
Racing	(Mexico) Víctor Hernández	Boca del Río, Veracruz	Unidad Deportiva Hugo Sánchez	4,000	Racing de Veracruz	Joma	–

== Regular season ==
=== Standings ===
Pos	Team	Pld	W	D	L	GF	GA	GD	BP	Pts	Qualification or relegation
1	Artesanos Metepec (C)	18	13	2	3	35	14	+21	1	42	Semi–finals
2	Poza Rica	18	9	3	6	24	26	−2	1	31	Reclassification
3	Racing	18	7	9	2	23	11	+12	0	30	Reclassification
4	Gorilas de Juanacatlán	18	8	4	6	25	16	+9	2	30	Reclassification
5	Acámbaro	18	8	3	7	30	32	−2	3	30	Reclassification
6	Ayense	18	7	4	7	28	20	+8	3	28	Reclassification
7	Dragones de Oaxaca	18	6	7	5	23	16	+7	3	28	Reclassification
8	Aguacateros CDU	18	7	4	7	31	31	0	2	27	
9	Caja Oblatos	18	2	4	12	9	38	−29	2	12	
10	Huracanes Izcalli	18	2	2	14	23	47	−24	1	9	

Updated to match(es) played on 17 March 2026. Source: Liga Premier FMF
(C) Champions

=== Positions by round ===
Leader and qualification to Liguilla semi–finals
Qualification to Reclassification
Last place in table

Team ╲ Round	1	2	3	4	5	6	7	8	9	10	11	12	13	14	15	16	17	18
Artesanos Metepec	2	1	4	1	1	1	1	1	1	1	1	1	1	1	1	1	1	1
Poza Rica	4	5	2	7	7	7	7	7	4	5	5	5	3	3	4	5	8	2
Racing	3	3	6	4	5	4	3	5	3	2	2	2	2	2	2	3	3	3
Gorilas de Juanacatlán	7	8	7	5	6	3	4	2	2	3	4	3	5	5	3	2	2	4
Acámbaro	8	4	1	6	2	5	6	3	5	7	7	8	8	8	8	7	6	5
Ayense	5	7	3	2	3	6	5	6	8	6	6	7	7	6	6	4	4	6
Dragones de Oaxaca	1	2	5	3	4	2	2	4	6	4	3	4	4	4	5	6	5	7
Aguacateros CDU	9	6	8	8	9	9	8	8	7	8	8	6	6	7	7	8	7	8
Caja Oblatos	6	9	9	9	10	10	10	10	10	10	10	10	10	10	10	9	9	9
Huracanes Izcalli	10	10	10	10	8	8	9	9	9	9	9	9	9	9	9	10	10	10

Updated to match(es) played on 17 March 2026. Source: Liga Premier FMF
Notes: † indicates team rested that round

=== Results ===
Home \ Away	ACM	ADU	ART	AYE	CAJ	DRA	GOR	HUR	PZR	RAC
Acámbaro	—	3–2	2–1	1–2	2–2	2–1	1–0	2–1	0–1	0–1
Aguacateros CDU	1–3	—	0–1	1–3	5–0	0–0	3–1	2–2	3–2	0–0
Artesanos Metepec	1–0	1–1	—	2–1	4–0	2–1	0–2	4–3	7–0	4–1
Ayense	3–0	2–3	0–1	—	2–2	0–2	1–2	3–0	4–1	1–1
Caja Oblatos	0–2	0–2	0–1	0–4	—	0–2	0–3	1–0	0–2	1–0
Dragones de Oaxaca	1–1	0–3	1–2	0–0	2–2	—	2–0	3–1	5–1	1–1
Gorilas de Juanacatlán	5–2	3–1	0–1	0–0	2–0	0–0	—	4–1	0–0	0–0
Huracanes Izcalli	3–8	3–4	0–2	1–2	3–0	0–2	1–2	—	3–2	1–1
Poza Rica	1–1	3–0	1–0	2–0	2–1	1–0	1–0	3–0	—	0–1
Racing	6–0	4–0	1–1	1–0	0–0	0–0	2–1	2–0	1–1	—

Updated to match(es) played on 17 March 2026. Source: Liga Premier FMF
Legend: Blue = home team win; Yellow = draw; Red = away team win.

=== Regular season statistics ===
==== Top goalscorers ====
Players sorted first by goals scored, then by last name.

Rank	Player	Club	Goals
1	(Mexico) Sergio Vázquez	Artesanos Metepec	15
2	(Mexico) Diego Domínguez	Acámbaro	14
3	(Mexico) Francisco Flores	Aguacateros CDU	12
4	(Mexico) Alejandro Sosa	Ayense	9
5	(Mexico) Víctor Rodríguez	Gorilas de Juanacatlán	8

Source:Liga Premier FMF

==== Hat-tricks ====
Player	For	Against	Result	Date	Round
(Mexico) Víctor Rodríguez	Gorilas de Juanacatlán	Huracanes Izcalli	4 – 1 (H)	20 September 2025	3
(Mexico) Sergio Vázquez	Artesanos Metepec	Poza Rica	7 – 0 (H)	4 October 2025	4
(Mexico) Franciso Flores	Aguacateros CDU	Caja Oblatos	5 – 0 (H)	22 November 2025	8

(H) – Home; (A) – Away

=== Attendance ===
==== Per team ====
Pos	Team	Total	High	Low	Average	Change
1	Aguacateros CDU	4,150	750	250	461	+20.4%^{1}
2	Poza Rica	4,022	670	150	447	−69.2%
3	Dragones de Oaxaca	3,744	1,347	78	416	n/a^{2,3}
4	Ayense	3,144	439	271	349	−44.2%
5	Gorilas de Juanacatlán	2,913	515	150	324	n/a^{2,3}
6	Acámbaro	2,738	497	100	304	+280.0%^{4}
7	Racing	2,437	562	40	271	n/a^{3,5}
8	Artesanos Metepec	1,771	378	70	197	+0.5%
9	Caja Oblatos	911	183	54	101	−6.5%
10	Huracanes Izcalli	540	100	32	60	−52.8%
	League total	26,370	1,347	32	293	+20.1%

Source: Liga Premier FMF
Notes:
Only regular season listed
1: Team played Liga Premier – Serie A last season
2: Team played Liga TDP last season.
3: Team played at least one match on an alternative field.
4: Team played last season in Mexico City as CDM
5: Team did not played last season.

==== Highest and lowest ====
Highest attended					Lowest attended			
Week	Home	Score	Away	Attendance	Home	Score	Away	Attendance
1	Dragones de Oaxaca	3–1	Huracanes Izcalli	900	Ayense	2–2	Caja Oblatos	350
2	Racing	1–1	Poza Rica	562	Huracanes Izcalli	3–4	Aguacateros CDU	63
3	Poza Rica	2–1	Caja Oblatos	482	Gorilas de Juanacatlán	4–1	Huracanes Izcalli	150
4	Gorilas de Juanacatlán	3–1	Aguacateros CDU	375	Caja Oblatos	0–2	Dragones de Oaxaca	93
5	Poza Rica	2–0	Ayense	623	Huracanes Izcalli	3–2	Caja Oblatos	62
6	Ayense	0–2	Dragones de Oaxaca	350	Caja Oblatos	0–3	Gorilas de Juanacatlán	93
7	Aguacateros CDU	3–2	Poza Rica	750	Dragones de Oaxaca	1–1	Acámbaro	100
8	Poza Rica	1–0	Dragones de Oaxaca	432	Acámbaro	2–1	Huracanes Izcalli	329
9	Racing	1–0	Ayense	455	Huracanes Izcalli	3–2	Poza Rica	32
10	Gorilas de Juanacatlán	0–0	Poza Rica	300	Huracanes Izcalli	0–2	Dragones de Oaxaca	50
11	Dragones de Oaxaca	2–0	Gorilas de Juanacatlán	685	Ayense	0–1	Artesanos Metepec	271
12	Ayense	2–3	Aguacateros CDU	439	Huracanes Izcalli	1–2	Gorilas de Juanacatlán	36
13	Dragones de Oaxaca	2–2	Caja Oblatos	1,347	Huracanes Izcalli	1–1	Racing	47
14	Ayense	4–1	Poza Rica	403	Artesanos Metepec	2–1	Dragones de Oaxaca	112
15	Aguacateros CDU	0–0	Racing	400	Huracanes Izcalli	0–2	Artesanos Metepec	50
16	Poza Rica	3–0	Aguacateros CDU	472	Caja Oblatos	1–0	Racing	54
17	Gorilas de Juanacatlán	0–0	Ayense	250	Racing	1–1	Artesanos Metepec	40
18	Aguacateros CDU	0–0	Dragones de Oaxaca	400	Artesanos Metepec	4–0	Caja Oblatos	70

Source: Liga Premier FMF

1. Does not include matches played behind closed doors.

== Liguilla ==
The best team of the regular season qualifies directly to the semifinals and the teams placed between the second and the seventh place qualify for the reclassification round (Repechaje). In the reclassification round the winner will advance to the semifinals, if there is a tie between both teams at the end of regular time, a penalty shoot-out will be held to define the winner. In the semifinals, if the two teams are tied on aggregate the higher seeded team advances. In the final, if the two teams are tied after both legs, the match goes to extra time and, if necessary, a penalty shoot-out.

Reclassification
4	Gorilas de Juanacatlán	0	4	4
5	Acámbaro	0	0	0
2	Poza Rica	1	2	3
7	Dragones de Oaxaca	1	1	2
3	Racing (s)	1	2	3
6	Ayense	1	2	3

Semi-finals
1	Artesanos Metepec	3	0	3
4	Gorilas de Juanacatlán	1	1	2
2	Poza Rica	1	1	2
3	Racing	2	1	3

Final
1	Artesanos Metepec	3	0	3
3	Racing	1	1	2

=== Reclassification ===
The first legs were played on 25 and 26 March, and the second legs were played on 28 and 29 March 2026.

Team 1	Agg.	Team 2	1st leg	2nd leg
Poza Rica	3–2	Dragones de Oaxaca	1–1	2–1
Racing (s)	3–3	Ayense	1–1	2–2
Gorilas de Juanacatlán	4–0	Acámbaro	0–0	4–0

Matches

25 March 2026
19:00 CST (UTC−6)

Dragones de Oaxaca	1–1	Poza Rica
Ayuzo 27'	Report	Maya 72'

Estadio Tecnológico de Oaxaca, Oaxaca City
Attendance: 1,257
Referee: Benjamín Hernández Rodríguez
28 March 2026
16:00 CST (UTC−6)

Poza Rica	2–1	Dragones de Oaxaca
Maya 50'; Mendoza 67'	Report	Toledo 14'

Estadio Heriberto Jara Corona, Poza Rica
Attendance: 3,100
Referee: Carlos Zohet Martínez

Poza Rica won 3–2 on aggregate.

25 March 2026
18:00 CST (UTC−6)

Ayense	1–1	Racing
Domínguez 13'	Report	Carrera 52'

Estadio Chino Rivas, Ayotlán
Attendance: 429
Referee: Gerardo Abraham García
28 March 2026
11:00 CST (UTC−6)

Racing	2–2	Ayense
Martín del Campo 14'; C. García 45'	Report	Ríos 1', 11'

Instalaciones FMF field 4, Toluca
Attendance: Behind closed doors
Referee: Héctor Morales Leal

3–3 on aggregate. Racing advanced due to being the higher seeded club.

26 March 2026
16:00 CST (UTC−6)

Acámbaro	0–0	Gorilas de Juanacatlán
	Report

Estadio Fray Salvador Rangel, Acámbaro
Attendance: 743
Referee: Jairo Jovani Sosa
29 March 2026
18:00 CST (UTC−6)

Gorilas de Juanacatlán	4–0	Acámbaro
Pacheco 3'; Tabarez 30'; Espinoza 46'; Medina 63'	Report

Club Juanacatlán, Juanacatlán
Attendance: 1,500
Referee: Oscar Yair Toledo

Gorilas de Juanacatlán won 4–0 on aggregate.

=== Semi–finals ===
The first legs were played on 1 April, and the second legs were played on 4 April 2026.

Team 1	Agg.	Team 2	1st leg	2nd leg
Artesanos Metepec	3–2	Gorilas de Juanacatlán	3–1	0–1
Poza Rica	2–3	Racing	1–2	1–1

Matches

1 April 2026
18:00 CST (UTC−6)

Gorilas de Juanacatlán	1–3	Artesanos Metepec
Ríos 61'	Report	Montes 9'; Hernández 31'; Mata 45'

Club Juanacatlán, Juanacatlán
Attendance: 400
Referee: Daniel Misael Marín
4 April 2026
16:00 CST (UTC−6)

Artesanos Metepec	0–1	Gorilas de Juanacatlán
	Report	Medina 51'

Unidad Deportiva Alarcón Hisojo, Metepec
Attendance: 500
Referee: Christian Cruz Mejía

Artesanos Metepec won 3–2 on aggregate.

1 April 2026
11:00 CST (UTC−6)

Racing	2–1	Poza Rica
Haro 16'; C. García 84'	Report	Trejo 72'

Instalaciones FMF field 2, Toluca
Attendance: Behind closed doors
Referee: Antonio Jesús Villarreal
4 April 2026
16:00 CST (UTC−6)

Poza Rica	1–1	Racing
Trejo 6'	Report	Birche 90'

Estadio Heriberto Jara Corona, Poza Rica
Attendance: 3,050
Referee: Francisco Pérez Toledano

Racing won 2–3 on aggregate.

=== Final ===
The first leg was played on 11 April, and the second leg was played on 18 April 2026.

Team 1	Agg.	Team 2	1st leg	2nd leg
Artesanos Metepec	3–2	Racing	3–1	0–1

11 April 2026
12:00 CST (UTC−6)

Racing	1–3	Artesanos Metepec
Birche 57'	Report	Ruiz 6'; Altamirano 21'; Montes 78'

Estadio de la FMF, Toluca
Attendance: 300
Referee: Héctor Morales Leal
18 April 2026
15:00 CST (UTC−6)

Artesanos Metepec	0–1	Racing
	Report	C. López 90'

Unidad Deportiva Alarcón Hisojo, Metepec
Attendance: 1,000
Referee: Carlos Zohet Martínez

Artesanos Metepec won 3–2 on aggregate.

== Coefficient table ==
P	Team	Pts	G	Pts/G	GD
1	Artesanos Metepec	42	18	2.333	+25
2	Poza Rica	31	18	1.722	–2
3	Racing	30	18	1.667	+12
4	Gorilas de Juanacatlán	30	18	1.667	+9
5	Acámbaro	30	18	1.667	–2
6	Ayense	28	18	1.556	+8
7	Dragones de Oaxaca	28	18	1.556	+7
8	Aguacateros CDU	27	18	1.500	0
9	Caja Oblatos	12	18	0.667	–29
10	Huracanes Izcalli	9	18	0.500	–18

Last updated: March 17, 2026
Source: Liga Premier FMF
P = Position; G = Games played; Pts = Points; Pts/G = Ratio of points to games played; GD = Goal difference

== See also ==
- 2025–26 Liga MX season
- 2025–26 Liga de Expansión MX season
- 2025–26 Serie A de México season
- 2025–26 Liga TDP season
- 2026 Copa Conecta
