= Liga Premier B =

- Organising body: Mexican Football Federation
- Founded: 2008; 18 years ago as Liga de Nuevos Talentos
- Country: Mexico
- Number of clubs: 10
- Level on pyramid: 3
- Promotion to: Premier A
- Relegation to: Liga TDP
- Current champions: Artesanos Metepec (1st title)
- Most championships: Correcaminos B Aguacateros CDU (3 titles each)
- Broadcasters: AYM Sports; Hi Sports; Televisa (Note: Includes Adrenalina Sports Network.); TVC Deportes (Note: Includes TVC Deportes 2.)
- Website: Official website
- Current: 2026–27 Liga Premier B season

Liga Premier B is a professional association football league in Mexico, part of the Liga Premier as the tertiary subdivision in the third level of the Mexican football league system. The league is contested by 10 clubs with less infrastructure, the champions are decided by a final knockout phase and aspire to participate in Premier A, if they meet all infrastructure and economic stability requirements.

Formerly known as Liga de Nuevos Talentos (2008–2017) and Liga Premier Serie B (2017–2026). From 2008 to 2026, it was the secondary subdivision of the Liga Premier. The league has been held in 30 editions, the inaugural tournament was the Apertura 2008 tournament with UA de Hidalgo crowned as the first champions.

Twenty-one clubs have been champions at least once. Correcaminos B and Aguacateros CDU are the most successful clubs with three titles each, UA de Hidalgo, Académicos, Santiago and Yalmakán with two titles each.

== History ==
The Liga de Nuevos Talentos was created in the second half of 2008 for developing clubs with less infrastructure in the Segunda División, with the participation and approval of the owners of the clubs of the Second and Third Division. In 2017, the subdivision was rebranded as Liga Premier Serie B.

In 2026, it was renamed as Premier B and becoming in the tertiary subdivision of the league, after the creation of the Primera Premier as the new major subdivision.

== Stadiums and locations ==
=== 2026–27 season ===
The 2026–27 Liga Premier B season has the following 10 participating clubs.

Locations of Premier B clubs in the 2026–27 season.

Club	Manager	City	Stadium	Capacity
Atlético Celaya B (Note: Team affiliated with Atlético Celaya.)	(Mexico) Nicolás Trejo	Celaya	Miguel Alemán Valdés	23,182
Atlético Hidalgo	(Mexico) Ángel Mejia	Atitalaquia	Municipal de Atitalaquía	3,000
Ayense	(Mexico) Conrado Castillo	Ayotlán	Chino Rivas	3,500
Cruz Azul Lagunas (Note: Team affiliated with Cruz Azul.)	(Mexico) Alexis López	Lagunas	Deportivo La Laguna	2,000
Gorilas	(Mexico) Everaldo Begines	León	Instituto Oviedo Náutico	800
Héroes de Zaci B (Note: Team affiliated with Héroes de Zaci.)	(Mexico) Pablo Robles	Nezahualcóyotl	Metropolitano	1,800
Huracanes Izcalli	(Mexico) Arturo Viche	Mexico City	Momoxco	3,500
Internacional Laguna	(Argentina) Miguel Ángel Vargas	Gómez Palacio	Unidad Deportiva Francisco Gómez Palacio	4,000
Irapuato B (Note: Team affiliated with Irapuato.)	(Mexico) Víctor Mendoza	Irapuato	Sergio León Chávez	25,000
Racing de Veracruz B (Note: Team affiliated with Racing de Veracruz.)	(Mexico) Alejandro Romero	San Juan Bautista Tuxtepec	Gustavo Pacheco Villaseñor (Note: Provisional stadium due to the closure of its stadium in Veracruz.)	15,000

=== On hiatus ===
Club	Manager	City	Stadium	Capacity
Aguacateros CDU (Note: Team affiliated with Atlético Morelia.)	(Mexico) Edgar Tolentino	Uruapan	Unidad Deportiva Hermanos López Rayón	5,000
Caja Oblatos	(Mexico) Ángel Monares	Tonalá	Unidad Deportiva Revolución Mexicana	3,000
Poza Rica	(Mexico) Alberto Segura	Poza Rica	Heriberto Jara Corona	10,000

== Performances ==
Ranking	Club	Titles	Runners-up	Seasons
1	Correcaminos B	3	1	Ape–2009, Ape–2015, Ape–2016
1	Aguacateros CDU	3	0	Ape–2021, Cla–2022, 2023–24
3	UA de Hidalgo	2	1	Ape–2008, Bic–2010
3	Académicos/ Atlas B	2	1	Cla–2012, Ape–2012
3	Santiago	2	0	Ape–2024, Cla–2025
3	Yalmakán	2	0	Cla–2017, Ape–2017
7	América Coapa	1	2	Cla–2009
7	Calor	1	2	Ape–2022
7	Alebrijes B	1	2	Cla–2023
7	Alacranes de Durango	1	1	Cla–2013
7	Pioneros de Cancún	1	1	Ape–2013
7	Selva Cañera	1	1	Cla–2014
7	Real Zamora	1	1	Cla–2016
7	Artesanos Metepec	1	1	2025–26
7	Cachorros UANL	1	0	Ind–2010
7	Cachorros de León	1	0	Rev–2011
7	Estudiantes Tecos B	1	0	Ape–2011
7	Mineros de Fresnillo	1	0	Ape–2014
7	Sahuayo	1	0	Cla–2015
7	Orizaba	1	0	Cla–2018
7	Cañoneros	1	0	2018–19
22	Santos de Soledad	0	2	—
22	Alto Rendimiento Tuzo	0	1	—
22	Alacranes B	0	1	—
22	Pumas Naucalpan	0	1	—
22	Atlético San Luis B	0	1	—
22	Sporting Canamy	0	1	—
22	Lobos Prepa	0	1	—
22	Tlaxcala	0	1	—
22	Leones Negros B	0	1	—
22	Deportivo CAFESSA	0	1	—
22	T'HÓ Mayas	0	1	—
22	Ayense	0	1	—
22	Atlético Pachuca	0	1	—
22	Racing	0	1	—

== Cup tournament ==
Copa de la Liga de Nuevos Talentos was a domestic cup tournament for clubs in the Liga de Nuevos Talentos, the secondary subdivision of the Segunda División, it was held from 2013 to 2015.

The competition was held in four editions, the inaugural tournament was the Apertura 2013 with Chivas Rayadas crowned as the first champions. Two clubs were champions at least once. América Coapa and Chivas Rayadas were the most successful clubs with two titles each.

=== Results ===
Ed.	Season	Champions	Results	Runners-up
1	Ape–2013	Chivas Rayadas	2–2; 4–2	América Coapa
2	Cla–2014	Chivas Rayadas	0–0; 2–1	Académicos
3	Ape–2014	América Coapa	2–2; 0–0 (3–2 p)	Alto Rendimiento Tuzo
4	Cla–2015	América Coapa	4–1; 1–1	Alto Rendimiento Tuzo

=== Performances ===
Rank	Club	Titles	Runners-up	Seasons
1	América Coapa	2	1	Ape–2014, Cla–2015
1	Chivas Rayadas	2	0	Ape–2013, Cla–2014
3	Alto Rendimiento Tuzo	0	2	—
3	Académicos	0	1	—

== Campeón de Campeones ==
Campeón de Campeones de la Liga Premier Serie B was a domestic super cup contested by the Liga Premier Serie B champions of the Apertura and Clausura tournaments, it was held between 2009 and 2025.

Formerly known as Final de Ascenso de la Liga de Nuevos Talentos (2009–2017). The trophy was contested in 13 editions, the inaugural match was played in 2009 with América Coapa crowned as the first champions. Eleven clubs were champions at least once. Académicos and Yalmakán were the most successful clubs with two titles each.

=== Results ===
Ed.	Season	Champions	Results	Runners-up
Final de Ascenso de la Liga de Nuevos Talentos
1	2009	América Coapa	0–0; 0–0 (9–8 p)	UA de Hidalgo
2	2010	Correcaminos B	1–0; 1–1	UA de Hidalgo
3	2011	Cachorros de León	2–2; 4–1	Cachorros UANL
4	2012	Atlas B	2–2; 2–0	Estudiantes Tecos B
5	2013	Académicos	4–2; 0–0	Alacranes de Durango
6	2014	Pioneros de Cancún	1–0; 1–1	Selva Cañera
7	2015	Mineros de Fresnillo	1–0; 2–3 (4–3 p)	Sahuayo
8	2016	Real Zamora	5–0; 2–1	Correcaminos B
9	2017	Yalmakán	0–1; 2–0	Correcaminos B
Campeón de Campeones de la Liga Premier Serie B
10	2018	Yalmakán	2–0; 1–1	Orizaba
2019–2021		The competition was not held		
11	2022	Aguacateros CDU – champions automatically (Note: Trophy awarded automatically for winning the Apertura and Clausura tournaments.)		
12	2023	Alebrijes B	2–0; 2–4 (4–3 p)	Calor
2024		The competition was not held		
13	2025	Santiago – champions automatically		

== Offseason changes ==
- On 18 April 2026, Artesanos Metepec was promoted from Premier B to Premier A.
- On 23 May 2026, Cruz Azul Lagunas was promoted from Liga TDP to Liga Premier B.
- On 16 June 2026, Dragones de Oaxaca announced that they successfully passed the financial and sporting certification, and were therefore accepted into Premier A.
- On 25 June 2026, Gorilas de Juanacatlán was relocated to León, Guanajuato and renamed Gorilas F.C.
- On 8 July 2026, Acámbaro announced that they successfully passed the financial and sporting certification, and were therefore accepted into Premier A.
- On July 2026, F.C. Racing was rebranded as Racing de Veracruz B.
- On 1 August 2026, Atlético Hidalgo was moved to Premier B.
- On 1 August 2026, Internacional Laguna joined the league as expansion team.
- On 1 August 2026, Caja Oblatos and Poza Rica went on hiatus.
- On 10 August 2026, Aguacateros CDU went on hiatus.
- On 10 August 2026, Atlético Celaya B, Héroes de Zaci B and Irapuato B joined the league as expansion teams.
- On 14 August 2026, Racing de Veracruz B was relocated from Boca del Río, Veracruz to San Juan Bautista Tuxtepec, Oaxaca because the club was left without a stadium in Veracruz following the closure of the Unidad Deportiva Hugo Sánchez in February 2026.

== See also ==
- Sport in Mexico
- Football in Mexico
- Mexican football league system
- Mexican Football Federation
- Liga Premier
- Primera Premier
- Liga Premier A
- Copa Conecta
- Copa Promesas MX
- Segunda División B
