= 2024 Copa Conecta =

Tournament details
- Country: Mexico
- Dates: 23 January 2024 – 10 April 2024
- Teams: 32

Final positions
- Champions: Racing Porto Palmeiras (1st title)
- Runners-up: Diablos Tesistán

Tournament statistics
- Matches played: 31
- Goals scored: 88 (2.84 per match)

The 2024 Copa Conecta was the 3rd edition of the Copa Conecta, a knockout competition for Mexican football clubs from Liga Premier and Liga TDP.

The Copa Conecta is an official Mexican tournament that was created in 2021 with the aim of providing a greater opportunity for development to the soccer players of the Premier and TDP league teams.

== Qualified teams ==
Champion team of the 2023 edition, the teams ranked in places 1–2 of the Serie A groups and the teams ranked in places 1–7 of Serie B in the first half of the 2023–24 season.

- Aguacateros CDU (Serie B – 6th Place)
- Artesanos Metepec (Serie B – 7th Place)
- Atlético Pachuca (Serie B – 2nd Place)
- Ayense (Serie B – 1st Place)
- CDM (Serie B – 3rd Place)
- Chihuahua (Serie A Group 1 – 1st Place)
- Chilpancingo (Serie B – 4th Place)
- Inter Playa del Carmen (2023 Copa Conecta champions)
- Los Cabos United (Serie A Group 1 – 2nd Place)
- Petroleros de Salamanca (Serie A Group 2 – 2nd Place)
- Racing Porto Palmeiras (Serie A Group 2 – 1st Place)
- Santiago (Serie B – 5th Place)

Teams classified at the first place of the 17 groups of the Liga TDP and the top 3 classified in the league coefficient table.

- Cadereyta (Liga TDP – Group 16)
- Celaya (Liga TDP – Group 10)
- Cimarrones de Sonora (Liga TDP – Group 17)
- Cordobés (Liga TDP – Group 5)
- Deportivo Tala (Liga TDP – Group 13, Classified by Coefficient)
- Diablos Tesistán (Liga TDP – Group 13)
- Estudiantes del COBACH (Liga TDP – Group 2)
- Garzas Blancas (Liga TDP – Group 9, Classified by Coefficient)
- H2O Purépechas (Liga TDP – Group 11)
- Leones Negros UdeG (Liga TDP – Group 13)
- Muxes (Liga TDP – Group 4)
- Orgullo Surtam (Liga TDP – Group 9)
- Orishas Tepeji (Liga TDP – Group 6)
- PDLA (Liga TDP – Group 3)
- Pioneros Junior (Liga TDP – Group 1)
- Potosinos (Liga TDP – Group 12)
- Tigres de Alica (Liga TDP – Group 15)
- Toluca (Liga TDP – Group 6, Classified by Coefficient)
- Tuzos Pachuca (Liga TDP – Group 8)
- Yautepec (Liga TDP – Group 7)

== Bracket ==
Round of 32
Yautepec	3
Chilpancingo	1
Pioneros Junior	0
Inter Playa del Carmen	2
Orgullo Surtam	2
Atlético Pachuca	0
Tuzos Pachuca	2
PDLA	0
Cordobés	1
Artesanos Metepec	0
CDM	3
Muxes	2
Orishas Tepeji	0
Toluca "B"	1
Estudiantes del COBACH	1
Racing Porto Palmeiras	2
H2O Purépechas	1
Aguacateros CDU	0
Celaya "B"	0
Petroleros de Salamanca	5
Cadereyta	1
Santiago	0
Potosinos	2
Garzas Blancas	1
Diablos Tesistán	4
Ayense	1
Tigres de Alica	1
Deportivo Tala	2
Cimarrones de Sonora "C"	3
Chihuahua	1
Leones Negros UdeG "C"	1
Los Cabos United	2

Round of 16
Yautepec	1
Inter Playa del Carmen	0
Orgullo Surtam	3 (12)
Tuzos Pachuca (p.)	3 (13)
Cordobés	0 (1)
CDM (p.)	0 (4)
Toluca "B"	1
Racing Porto Palmeiras	3
H2O Purépechas (p.)	1 (5)
Petroleros de Salamanca	1 (4)
Cadereyta	1
Potosinos	2
Diablos Tesistán (p.)	1 (4)
Deportivo Tala	1 (2)
Cimarrones de Sonora "C"	2 (4)
Los Cabos United (p.)	2 (5)

Quarter–finals
Yautepec	2
Tuzos Pachuca	1
CDM
Racing Porto Palmeiras	2
H2O Purépechas (p.)	1 (3)
Potosinos	1 (2)
Diablos Tesistán	4
Los Cabos United	2

Semi–finals
Yautepec	0
Racing Porto Palmeiras	1
H2O Purépechas	0
Diablos Tesistán	4

Final
Racing Porto Palmeiras	2
Diablos Tesistán	0

== Matches ==
=== Round of 32 ===
The matches were played on 23 and 24 January 2024.

Team 1	Score	Team 2
Pioneros Junior	0–2	Inter Playa del Carmen
Estudiantes del COBACH	1–2	Racing Porto Palmeiras
Orgullo Surtam	2–0	Atlético Pachuca
CDM	3–2	Muxes
Cordobés	1–0	Artesanos Metepec
Orishas Tepeji	0–1	Toluca "B"
Yautepec	3–1	Chilpancingo
Tuzos Pachuca	2–0	PDLA
Celaya TDP	0–5	Petroleros de Salamanca
H2O Purépechas	1–0	Aguacateros CDU
Cimarrones de Sonora "C"	3–1	Chihuahua
Tigres de Alica	1–2	Deportivo Tala
Leones Negros UdeG "C"	1–2	Los Cabos United
Diablos Tesistán	4–1	Ayense
Potosinos	2–1	Garzas Blancas
Cadereyta	1–0	Santiago

Matches

23 January 2024	Pioneros Junior	0–2	Inter Playa del Carmen	Cancún, Quintana Roo
15:00 EST (UTC−5)		Report	González 46'; Pérez 73'	Stadium: Estadio Cancún 86; Attendance: 1,500; Referee: Heisel Gerardo Santana Argüelles

23 January 2024	Cimarrones de Sonora "C"	3–1	Chihuahua	Hermosillo, Sonora
15:00 MST (UTC−7)	Orrantia 14', 38'; Payares 77'	Report	Ruiz 55'	Stadium: Estadio Héroe de Nacozari; Attendance: 0 Referee: Abraham Guadalupe Espinoza Serrano

23 January 2024	Celaya TDP	0–5	Petroleros de Salamanca	Celaya, Guanajuato
16:00 CST (UTC−6)			González 25', 64'; Morales 50'; Vázquez 61'; Topete 78'	Stadium: Estadio Miguel Alemán Valdés; Attendance: 250; Referee: Luis Roberto Hernández Salas

23 January 2024	Orishas Tepeji	0–1	Toluca "B"	Tepeji del Río, Hidalgo
18:00 CST (UTC−6)		Report	Castillo 10'	Stadium: Deportivo Tepeji; Attendance: 250; Referee: Luis Felipe Castillo Martínez

23 January 2024	Yautepec	3–1	Chilpancingo	Yautepec, Morelos
18:00 CST (UTC−6)	Meléndez 30', 44', 65'	Report	Nava 90'	Stadium: Centro Deportivo Yautepec; Attendance: 300; Referee: Daniel Misael Marín Quiroz

23 January 2024	Cadereyta	1–0	Santiago	Cadereyta Jiménez, Nuevo León
18:00 CST (UTC−6)	Díaz 56'	Report		Stadium: Estadio Clemente Salinas Netro; Attendance: 300; Referee: Daniel Misael Marín Quiroz

24 January 2024	Potosinos	2–1	Garzas Blancas	San Luis Potosí City, San Luis Potosí
10:00 CST (UTC−6)	Cerda 47'; De la Torre 54'	Report	Salas 38'	Stadium: Unidad Deportiva Adolfo López Mateos; Attendance: 100; Referee: Mauricio Rodríguez Martínez

24 January 2024	Leones Negros UdeG "C"	1–2	Los Cabos United	Zapopan, Jalisco
15:00 CST (UTC−6)	Morales 48'	Report	Andrey 29', 45'	Stadium: Club Deportivo La Primavera; Attendance: 50; Referee: Omar Alejandro Ortega García

24 January 2024	Orgullo Surtam	2–0	Atlético Pachuca	Tampico and Ciudad Madero, Tamaulipas
15:00 CST (UTC−6)	Reyes 34'; Márquez 85'	Report		Stadium: Estadio Tamaulipas; Attendance: 250; Referee: Rolando Arturo Alcalá Ramírez

24 January 2024	H2O Purépechas	1–0	Aguacateros CDU	Morelia, Michoacán
15:00 CST (UTC−6)	Rivas 39'	Report		Stadium: Cancha Anexa Estadio Morelos; Attendance: 300; Referee: Oswaldo Javier Quezada Gómez

24 January 2024	Tuzos Pachuca	2–0	PDLA	San Agustín Tlaxiaca, Hidalgo
15:00 CST (UTC−6)	Rojas 23'; Méndez 59'	Report		Stadium: Universidad del Fútbol; Attendance: 200; Referee: Alejandro Tavernier Pérez

24 January 2024	Tigres de Alica	1–2	Deportivo Tala	Tepic, Nayarit
15:00 MST (UTC−7)	Saavedra 60' (own)	Report	Cuevas 28', 33'	Stadium: Unidad Deportiva Juanelo; Attendance: 300; Referee: Alan Eduardo Contreras Sotelo

24 January 2024	Diablos Tesistán	4–1	Ayense	Tesistán, Jalisco
15:15 CST (UTC−6)	Botello 22'; Casillas 24'; Arteaga 36'; Briseño 82'	Report	Magallón 28'	Stadium: Deportivo Diablos Tesistán; Attendance: 500; Referee: Mario Velázquez Román

24 January 2024	Estudiantes del COBACH	1–2	Racing Porto Palmeiras	Tuxtla Gutiérrez, Chiapas
15:30 CST (UTC−6)	Espinosa 26'	Report	Aguilar 44' (own); Leal 51'	Stadium: Estadio Víctor Manuel Reyna; Attendance: 1,200; Referee: Feliciano Álvarez Nanduca

24 January 2024	Cordobés	1–0	Artesanos Metepec	Huixquilucan, State of Mexico
15:30 CST (UTC−6)	Benítez 90'	Report		Stadium: Estadio Alberto Pérez Navarro; Attendance: 100; Referee: Benjamín Hernández Rodríguez

24 January 2024	CDM	3–2	Muxes	Xochimilco, Mexico City
15:30 CST (UTC−6)	Olivares 25'; Islas 41'; Muñoz 49'	Report	Olmos 13'; Velázquez 80'	Stadium: Estadio Valentín González; Attendance: 500; Referee: José Carlos Meléndez Cansino

=== Round of 16 ===
The matches were played on 6, 7 and 8 February 2024.

Team 1	Score	Team 2
Yautepec	1–0	Inter Playa del Carmen
Orgullo Surtam	3–3 (12–13) (p.)	Tuzos Pachuca
Cordobés	0–0 (1–4) (p.)	CDM
Toluca "B"	1–3	Racing Porto Palmeiras
H2O Purépechas	(p.) 1–1 (5–4)	Petroleros de Salamanca
Cadereyta	1–2	Potosinos
Diablos Tesistán	(p.) 1–1 (4–2)	Deportivo Tala
Cimarrones de Sonora "C"	2–2 (4–5) (p.)	Los Cabos United

Matches

6 February 2024	Orgullo Surtam	3–3 (12–13 p)	Tuzos Pachuca	Tampico and Ciudad Madero, Tamaulipas
15:00 CST (UTC−6)	De la Rosa 8'; Juárez 17', 49'	Report	Calderón 36'; Ortega 58'; Castillo 76'	Stadium: Estadio Tamaulipas; Attendance: 550; Referee: Juan Jesús Selvera Parada

6 February 2024	H2O Purépechas	1–1 (5–4 p)	Petroleros de Salamanca	Morelia, Michoacán
15:00 CST (UTC−6)	Fuentes 59'	Report	Mendoza 36'	Stadium: Cancha Anexa Estadio Morelos; Attendance: 150; Referee: Rafael Heras Villa

6 February 2024	Cordobés	0–0 (1–4 p)	CDM	Huixquilucan, State of Mexico
15:30 CST (UTC−6)		Report		Stadium: Estadio Alberto Pérez Navarro; Attendance: 120; Referee: Maximiliano Arias Guzmán

6 February 2024	Yautepec	1–0	Inter Playa del Carmen	Yautepec, Morelos
16:00 CST (UTC−6)	Silva 59'	Report		Stadium: Centro Deportivo Yautepec; Attendance: 400; Referee: Mauricio Roque Trejo

6 February 2024	Cadereyta	1–2	Potosinos	Cadereyta Jiménez, Nuevo León
18:00 CST (UTC−6)	Maciel 88'	Report	Cerda 64'; Barrón 78'	Stadium: Estadio Clemente Salinas Netro; Attendance: 300; Referee: José Miguel Peña Alanís

7 February 2024	Toluca "B"	1–3	Racing Porto Palmeiras	Metepec, State of Mexico
10:00 CST (UTC−6)	Castillo 58'	Report	Díaz 13'; Sánchez 48'; Cruz 90'	Stadium: Instalaciones de Metepec field 2 Attendance: Miguel Ángel Morales Sánchez; Referee: 50

7 February 2024	Diablos Tesistán	1–1 (4–2 p)	Deportivo Tala	Tesistán, Jalisco
15:15 CST (UTC−6)	Botello 48'	Report	Hernández 75'	Stadium: Deportivo Diablos Tesistán; Attendance: 300; Referee: Omar Alejandro Ortega García

8 February 2024	Cimarrones de Sonora "C"	2–2 (4–5 p)	Los Cabos United	Hermosillo, Sonora
15:00 MST (UTC−7)	Payares 31'; Talavera 90'	Report	Cruz 36'; Ríos 70'	Stadium: Estadio Héroe de Nacozari; Attendance: 0 Referee: Félix Jahir Villegas Ávalos

=== Quarter–finals ===
The matches were played on 20 and 21 February 2024.

Team 1	Score	Team 2
Yautepec	2–1	Tuzos Pachuca
CDM	1–2	Racing Porto Palmeiras
H2O Purépechas	(p.) 1–1 (3–2)	Potosinos
Diablos Tesistán	4–2	Los Cabos United

Matches

20 February 2024	H2O Purépechas	1–1 (3–2 p)	Potosinos	Morelia, Michoacán
15:00 CST (UTC−6)	Rodríguez 45'	Report	Barrón 65'	Stadium: Cancha Anexa Estadio Morelos; Attendance: 100; Referee: Axel Jesús Ibares González

20 February 2024	Diablos Tesistán	4–2	Los Cabos United	Tesistán, Jalisco
15:15 CST (UTC−6)	Briseño 39', 76'; Botello 59'; Casillas 69'	Report	Gámez 18'; Rangel 29'	Stadium: Deportivo Diablos Tesistán; Attendance: 200; Referee: Omar Alejandro Ortega García

20 February 2024	Yautepec	2–1	Tuzos Pachuca	Yautepec, Morelos
18:00 CST (UTC−6)	Rodríguez 90'; Aguilar 90+2'		Uribe 6'	Stadium: Centro Deportivo Yautepec; Attendance: 700; Referee: Omar Alejandro Ortega García

21 February 2024	CDM	1–2	Racing Porto Palmeiras	Xochimilco, Mexico City
12:00 CST (UTC−6)	Islas 35'	Report	González 8'; Ruiz 68'	Stadium: Estadio Valentín González; Attendance: 200; Referee: Marco Antonio Návez Hernández

=== Semi–finals ===
The matches were played on 13 and 20 March 2024.

Team 1	Score	Team 2
Yautepec	0–1	Racing Porto Palmeiras
Diablos Tesistán	4–0	H2O Purépechas

Matches

13 March 2024	Diablos Tesistán	4–0	H2O Purépechas	Tesistán, Jalisco
15:15 CST (UTC−6)	Arteaga 51'; Botello 53'; Casillas 64'; López 81'	Report		Stadium: Deportivo Diablos Tesistán; Attendance: 300; Referee: Héctor Emilio Contreras Sotelo

20 March 2024	Yautepec	0–1	Racing Porto Palmeiras	Yautepec, Morelos
18:00 CST (UTC−6)		Report	Hernández 23'	Stadium: Centro Deportivo Yautepec; Attendance: 600; Referee: Daniel Misael Marin Quiroz

=== Final ===
The match was played on 10 April 2024

Team 1	Score	Team 2
Diablos Tesistán	0–2	Racing Porto Palmeiras

10 April 2024	Diablos Tesistán	0–2	Racing Porto Palmeiras	Tesistán, Jalisco
15:15 CST (UTC−6)		Report	Sánchez 81'; Rodríguez 85'	Stadium: Deportivo Diablos Tesistán; Attendance: 1,000; Referee: Omar Alejandro Ortega García

2024 winners

1st title

== See also ==
- 2023–24 Serie A de México season
- 2023–24 Serie B de México season
- 2023–24 Liga TDP season
