= Sebastián Martínez (footballer, born 2001) =

Mexican footballer

Personal information
- Full name: Sebastián Martínez Vidrio
- Date of birth: 6 January 2001 (age 25)
- Place of birth: Coatzacoalcos, Veracruz, Mexico
- Height: 1.75 m (5 ft 9 in)
- Position: Forward

Team information
- Current team: Dragones de Oaxaca
- Number: 10

Youth career
- 2014–2019: Guadalajara

Senior career*
Years	Team	Apps	(Gls)
2019–2024	Guadalajara	4	(0)
2020–2022	→ Tapatío (loan)	42	(7)
2023	→ Tepatitlán (loan)	17	(4)
2023–2024	→ Tapatío (loan)	7	(0)
2024–2025	Racing de Veracruz	5	(2)
2025	Racing	4	(0)
2026	Durango	10	(5)
2026–	Dragones de Oaxaca	2	(1)

International career
2016	Mexico U15	1	(1)
- * Club domestic league appearances and goals as of 15 May 2026

Sebastián Martínez Vidrio (born 6 January 2001) is a Mexican professional footballer who plays as a forward for Dragones de Oaxaca. He was included in The Guardian's "Next Generation 2018".

== Career statistics ==
=== Club ===
As of 5 October 2022

Club	Season	League			Cup		Continental		Other		Total	
Club	Season	Division	Apps	Goals	Apps	Goals	Apps	Goals	Apps	Goals	Apps	Goals
Guadalajara	2018–19	Liga MX	–		1	0	–		–		1	0
Guadalajara	2019–20	Liga MX	–		2	0	–		–		2	0
Guadalajara	2020–21	Liga MX	3	0	–		–		–		3	0
Guadalajara	2021–22	Liga MX	1	0	–		–		–		1	0
Guadalajara	Total		4	0	3	0	0	0	0	0	7	0
Tapatío (loan)	2020–21	Liga de Expansión MX	6	3	—		—		—		6	3
Tapatío (loan)	2021–22	Liga de Expansión MX	23	4	—		—		—		23	4
Tapatío (loan)	2022–23	Liga de Expansión MX	13	0	—		—		—		13	0
Tapatío (loan)	Total		42	7	—		—		—		42	7
Career total			46	7	3	0	0	0	0	0	49	7
