= Enrique Gómez (footballer) =

Mexican footballer (born 2004)

Personal information
- Full name: Enrique Gómez Iturbe
- Date of birth: 24 January 2004 (age 22)
- Place of birth: Ixtapan de la Sal, Mexico, Mexico
- Height: 1.67 m (5 ft 6 in)
- Position: Midfielder

Team information
- Current team: Artesanos Metepec
- Number: 19

Youth career
- 2019–2022: Toluca

Senior career*
Years	Team	Apps	(Gls)
2022–2023	Toluca	1	(0)
2025–	Artesanos Metepec	12	(2)
- * Club domestic league appearances and goals as of 3 April 2026

Enrique Gómez Iturbe (born 24 January 2004) is a Mexican professional footballer who plays as a midfielder for Liga Premier club Artesanos Metepec.

== Career statistics ==
=== Club ===
As of 3 April 2026

Club	Season	League			Cup		Continental		Other		Total	
Club	Season	Division	Apps	Goals	Apps	Goals	Apps	Goals	Apps	Goals	Apps	Goals
Toluca	2022–23	Liga MX	1	0	—		—		—		1	0
Artesanos Metepec	2025–26	Serie B	12	2	—		—		—		12	2
Career total			13	2	0	0	0	0	0	0	13	2
