= Martín Calderón =

Martín Calderón may refer to:

- Martín Calderón (footballer, born 1979), Mexican football manager and former footballer
- Martín Calderón (footballer, born 1999), Spanish footballer
