= Enrique Gómez =

Enrique Gómez may refer to:

- Enrique Gómez Carrillo (1873–1927), Guatemalan literary critic, writer, journalist and diplomat
- Enrique Gómez Correa (1915–1995,), Chilean poet, lawyer and diplomat
- Enrique Gómez (director) (1916–1955), Spanish screenwriter and film director
- Enrique Gómez (footballer) (born 2004), Mexican footballer
- Enrique Gómez Martínez (born 1968), Colombian politician
- Kike Hermoso (Enrique Gómez Hermoso, born 1999), Spanish footballer
