= Internacional Laguna F.C. =

Internacional Laguna
- Full name: Internacional Laguna Fútbol Club
- Founded: 3 September 2026; 24 days ago
- Ground: Unidad Deportiva Francisco Gómez Palacio; Gómez Palacio, Durango
- Capacity: 4,000
- Manager: Miguel Ángel Vargas
- League: Liga Premier (Premier B)
- 2026–27: Regular phase:TBD
Home colours	Away colours

Internacional Laguna Fútbol Club is a Mexican football club based in Gómez Palacio, Durango that competes in the Premier B, the lower tier of the Liga Premier de México, the third level division of Mexican football.

== History ==
On 10 August 2026, the list of participating teams for the 2026–27 season of the Liga Premier de México was announced; the list included a new team based in the Comarca Lagunera, the metropolitan area comprising the municipalities of Torreón, Gómez Palacio, and Lerdo, between the states of Coahuila and Durango, the club was called Atlético Laguna, although few details about the project were revealed.

After nearly a month since the announcement, the new team was finally presented on 3 September 2026, under the new name Internacional Laguna F.C., the team's definitive identity.

The team played its first official match on 12 September 2026, losing 0–2 to Héroes de Zaci B.

== Current squad ==
As of 26 September 2026

Note: Flags indicate national team as defined under FIFA eligibility rules; some limited exceptions apply. Players may hold more than one non-FIFA nationality.

No.	Pos.	Nation	Player
1	GK	MEX	Javier Baidon
2	DF	MEX	Carlos Ayón
4	DF	MEX	Yahir Pérez
5	DF	MEX	Gerardo Villagómez
6	MF	MEX	Yahir López
7	FW	MEX	Juan Ríos
8	MF	MEX	Manuel Calderón
9	FW	MEX	Fernando Álvarez
11	FW	MEX	Alonso Robles
12	DF	MEX	Jairo Ávalos
14	FW	MEX	Israel Sida

No.	Pos.	Nation	Player
15	DF	MEX	Pedro Muñoz
16	FW	MEX	Alexander Flores
17	DF	MEX	Germán López
18	FW	MEX	Omar Muro
19	DF	MEX	Juan Gandarilla
20	DF	MEX	Jesús Contreras
21	DF	MEX	Axel Villanueva
22	DF	MEX	David Martínez
23	GK	MEX	César García
24	MF	MEX	Amadeaus Montoya
25	GK	MEX	Jesús Castañeda
