= Martín Calderón (footballer, born 1979) =

Mexican footballer and manager

Personal information
- Full name: Martín Manuel Calderón Sequera
- Date of birth: 12 March 1979 (age 47)
- Place of birth: Veracruz City, Mexico
- Position: Forward

Senior career*
Years	Team	Apps	(Gls)
2002	Veracruz	11	(0)
2002–2003	Chiapas	3	(0)
2003–2004	Guerreros de Tlaxcala	12	(0)
2004–2005	Pioneros de Ciudad Obregón	37	(5)
2005–2006	Tampico Madero	33	(9)
2006–2007	Pegaso Real Colima	19	(2)
2007	Atlante	1	(0)
2007–2008	Durango	31	(22)
2008	León	9	(1)
2009	Petroleros de Salamanca	5	(0)
2009–2010	BUAP	22	(3)
2010	Sinaloa	15	(3)

Managerial career
- 2017–2019: Veracruz Reserves and Academy
- 2018: Veracruz (assistant)
- 2021–2023: Chiapas (assistant)
- 2024: Racing de Veracruz
- * Club domestic league appearances and goals

Martín Manuel Calderón Sequera (born March 12, 1979) is a Mexican football manager and former player.
