= Héctor Altamirano =

Mexican footballer (born 1977)

Personal information
- Full name: Héctor Altamirano Escudero
- Date of birth: 17 March 1977 (age 49)
- Place of birth: Matías Romero, Oaxaca, Mexico
- Height: 1.73 m (5 ft 8 in)
- Position: Right-back

Team information
- Current team: Racing de Veracruz (manager)

Senior career*
Years	Team	Apps	(Gls)
1997–1998	Cruz Azul	6	(1)
1998–2005	Santos Laguna	237	(37)
2005–2006	San Luis Potosí	29	(2)
2006–2007	Morelia	20	(1)
2007–2008	Tecos	15	(1)
2008–2009	Correcaminos	27	(5)
2009	Veracruz	10	(1)
2010–2011	Querétaro	40	(5)
2012	Cruz Azul Hidalgo	10	(2)

International career
1999–2005	Mexico	18	(4)

Managerial career
- 2014–2016: Querétaro U-17
- 2016–2017: Querétaro Premier
- 2017–2018: Querétaro (assistant)
- 2018: Cimarrones de Sonora
- 2019: Costa Rica (Assistant)
- 2019–2020: Celaya
- 2020–2021: Querétaro
- 2022: UAT
- 2023: Cafetaleros de Chiapas
- 2024: Herediano
- 2025: Guadalajara (Assistant)
- 2026: Puebla (Assistant)
- 2026–: Racing de Veracruz
Medal record
Representing Mexico
Men's Football
Pan American Games
Gold medal – first place	1999 Winnipeg	Team competition
- * Club domestic league appearances and goals

Héctor "Pity" Altamirano Escudero (born 17 March 1977) is a Mexican former professional footballer who played as a right-back. Since September 2026 is the manager of Racing de Veracruz.

== Club career ==
Altamirano made his debut in the Primera División in the 1997 Winter season with Cruz Azul after coming up through their youth ranks. However, after a less than satisfactory year with only six appearances, he transferred to Santos Laguna. Since joining Santos, Altamirano has become a constant danger on the team's right flank, and in his six years with the club, he has started 212 games and scored 36 goals. After his successful spell with Santos Laguna, the Mexican footballer was sold to newly ascended San Luis during the summer 2005 transfer window, or the "Draft", as it is commonly known in Mexico. After a successful year at San Luis in which Altamirano helped the club reach a league final, Altamirano joined CA Monarcas Morelia during the summer of 2006. With no big success he was then transferred to Tecos.

Altamirano joined Correcaminos for the Apertura 2008–09 season.

More recently, he is venturing into new business enterprises outside of professional football. He announced on April 6, 2016, in an interview with Reforma that he is opening a mid-size fish aquarium in San Luis, a city he represented as a player. His aquarium hosts mostly sea fish and mammals, including white sharks and orcas.

== International career ==
=== International goals ===
Scores and results list Mexico's goal tally first.

Goal	Date	Venue	Opponent	Score	Result	Competition
1.	27 June 2004	Estadio Victoria, Aguascalientes City, Mexico	Dominica	8–0	8–0	2006 FIFA World Cup qualification
2.	13 July 2004	Estadio Miguel Grau, Piura, Peru	Ecuador	1–0	2–1	2004 Copa América
3.	13 November 2004	Miami Orange Bowl, Miami, United States	Saint Kitts and Nevis	1–0	5–0	2006 FIFA World Cup qualification
4.	17 November 2004	Estadio Tecnológico, Monterrey, Mexico	Saint Kitts and Nevis	1–0	8–0	2006 FIFA World Cup qualification
