= Gorilas F.C. (Mexico) =

- Full name: Gorilas Fútbol Club
- Nickname: Gorilas
- Founded: 2016; 10 years ago
- Ground: Insituto Oviedo Náutico; León, Guanajuato, Mexico
- Capacity: 800
- Owner: Alejandro Muñoz
- Chairman: Alejandro Muñoz
- Manager: Everaldo Begines
- League: Liga Premier (Premier B)
- 2025–26: Liga Premier (Serie B); Regular phase: 4th Final phase: Semi–finals
Home colours	Away colours	Third colours

Gorilas Fútbol Club, previously named Gorilas de Juanacatlán, is a football club that plays in the Premier B, the bottom branch of the Liga Premier de México, the third tier of Mexican football. It is based in the city of León, Guanajuato.

== History ==
The team was founded in 2016 with the aim of training professional players from neighboring towns: El Salto and Juanacatlán, Jalisco.

In the 2018–19 season, the team finished in third position of group X with 81 points. So Gorilas managed to qualify for the promotion playoff. On the Round of 32 Gorilas defeated Valle F.C. by 9–1 on the aggregate, however, in the Round of 16 the Juanacatlán team was eliminated by Orgullo Surtam on penalty series after drawing 2–2 in the aggregate.

On May 25, 2025, the team was promoted to the Liga Premier de México after defeating Deportivo Zamora F.C. in the regional semi–finals. The team had finished the regular season in first place in its group and had previously eliminated H2O Purépechas, Deportivo Etchojoa and Irritilas F.C.

In their only season in Liga Premier – Serie B, Gorilas reached the semifinals of the season, where they were defeated by Artesanos Metepec F.C.

On June 25, 2026 the Gorilas board announced the sale of its Serie B franchise to an entrepeneur based in León, Guanajuato. However, the team will maintain its professional participation in Juanacatlán through its Liga TDP team.

== Players ==
As of 11 September 2026

Note: Flags indicate national team as defined under FIFA eligibility rules; some limited exceptions apply. Players may hold more than one non-FIFA nationality.

No.	Pos.	Nation	Player
1	GK	MEX	Diego Reyes
2	DF	MEX	Mario Cravioto
3	DF	MEX	Fernando Serratos
4	DF	MEX	Adrián López
5	DF	MEX	Luis Ibarra
6	MF	MEX	Fernando Rivera
7	MF	MEX	Dylan Borjas
8	MF	MEX	Julio González
9	FW	MEX	Fabián Razo
10	FW	MEX	Ricardo Calderas
11	DF	MEX	Javier Cano
12	DF	MEX	José Juárez
13	DF	MEX	Carlos Jiménez
14	MF	MEX	Héctor Dávalos
15	FW	MEX	Jonathan González

No.	Pos.	Nation	Player
16	FW	MEX	Diego Aguado
17	MF	MEX	Josué Zazueta
18	MF	MEX	Ian Álvarez
19	DF	MEX	Emiliano Durán
20	FW	MEX	Roberto Terrones
21	MF	MEX	Ulises Delgado
22	FW	MEX	Gael Rodríguez
23	FW	MEX	Jorge Esparza
24	MF	MEX	Adonaí Briseño
25	GK	MEX	Hugo Becerra
26	DF	MEX	Leonel Hernández
27	MF	MEX	Tristán Lara
28	GK	MEX	Julián Mariscal
29	FW	MEX	Jonathan Reyes
31	DF	MEX	Diego Ciénega

== Reserves ==
=== Gorilas TDP ===
Reserve team that plays in the Liga TDP, the fourth level of Mexican football.

=== Gorilas de Juanacatlán ===
Reserve team that plays in the Liga TDP.
