= Racing de Veracruz B =

Mexican association football club

- Full name: Racing de Veracruz B
- Founded: 16 June 2025; 15 months ago (As F.C. Racing)
- Stadium: Estadio Gustavo Pacheco Villaseñor; San Juan Bautista Tuxtepec, Oaxaca
- Capacity: 15,000
- Owner: Racing Sports Holding
- Chairman: Luis Manuel Roca
- Manager: Alejandro Romero
- League: Liga Premier (Premier B)
- 2025–26: Liga Premier (Serie B); Regular phase: 3rd Final phase: Runner–up
- Website: futbolclubracing.com.mx/club-2/
Home colours	Away colours

Racing de Veracruz B, formerly named Fútbol Club Racing, is a Mexican professional football team based in San Juan Bautista Tuxtepec, Oaxaca that plays in the Premier B, the bottom branch of the Liga Premier de México, the third tier of Mexican football. It is the farm team of Racing de Veracruz, a club that plays in the Primera Premier.

== History ==
In May 2025, Racing de Veracruz launched a new sports strategy focused on developing youth squads that would provide players for the first team. Therefore, on 16 June 2025, the launch of F.C. Racing, the club's first subsidiary team, was announced.

On 27 June, the team's acceptance as a new member of the Liga Premier was announced, being placed in the Serie B, the league's division dedicated to teams focused on player development.

On 12 November 2025, F.C. Racing won its first official title after winning the annual edition of the U–19 Copa Promesas MX, a tournament that combines teams from the Liga Premier de México with the U-19 squads of Liga MX clubs.

On 10 March 2026, Racing won the 2026 Copa Conecta, the cup tournament held between the Liga Premier and Liga TDP teams.

On July 2026 the team was renamed Racing de Veracruz B so that the players from this team can be integrated into the Racing de Veracruz structure and participate in matches for the club's first team. Furthermore, this change allows Racing B to field players registered with the first team.

On 14 August 2026, the team announced its relocation to the city of San Juan Bautista Tuxtepec, Oaxaca, located approximately 150 kilometers from Veracruz, following the relocation of all the club's teams after they were left without a suitable stadium in Veracruz.

== Honors ==
- Copa Promesas MX U–19
  - Champions (1): 2025
- Copa Conecta
  - Champions (1): 2026

== Players ==
As of 11 September 2026

Note: Flags indicate national team as defined under FIFA eligibility rules; some limited exceptions apply. Players may hold more than one non-FIFA nationality.

No.	Pos.	Nation	Player
461	GK	MEX	Reyli Arroyo
463	GK	MEX	Brian Betancourt
464	DF	MEX	Ricardo López
465	DF	MEX	Oscar Díaz
466	DF	MEX	Anselmo Ávila
467	DF	MEX	Iván Ruiz
468	DF	MEX	Jesús Zurita
470	DF	MEX	Edgar Mendoza
471	DF	MEX	Zahir Carreón
472	MF	MEX	Germán Buitimea
473	MF	MEX	José Birche

No.	Pos.	Nation	Player
474	MF	MEX	Jalil Sánchez
476	MF	MEX	Julio Carrera
478	MF	MEX	Diego Trejo
480	MF	MEX	Edson Padilla
481	MF	MEX	Julián Payares
483	MF	MEX	José Espinoza
484	FW	MEX	Yair Martínez
486	MF	MEX	Víctor Rodríguez
487	FW	MEX	Carlo Montes
488	FW	MEX	Isaác Gómez
