= Ángel Monares =

Mexican footballer and manager (born 1973)

Personal information
- Full name: Ángel Santiago Monares Cruz
- Date of birth: July 24, 1973 (age 53)
- Place of birth: Guadalajara, Jalisco, Mexico
- Height: 1.70 m (5 ft 7 in)

Team information
- Current team: Caja Oblatos (manager)

Senior career*
Years	Team	Apps	(Gls)
1995–1997	Tecos		
1997	Puebla	4	(0)

Managerial career
- 2008–2010: Vaqueros
- 2010: Atlético Cocula
- 2010: La Piedad (Assistant)
- 2013: Estudiantes Tecos II
- 2014: Cimarrones de Sonora
- 2015: Puebla Premier (Assistant)
- 2015: Puebla U20
- 2016: Académicos de Atlas
- 2016: Atlas U20 (Assistant)
- 2017: Alianza
- 2017: Cafetaleros de Tapachula (Assistant)
- 2018: Dorados de Sinaloa (Assistant)
- 2020–2022: Tepatitlán (Assistant)
- 2022–2023: Celaya (Assistant)
- 2024: Pioneros de Cancún (Assistant)
- 2026–: Caja Oblatos
- * Club domestic league appearances and goals

Ángel Santiago Monares Cruz (born July 24, 1973, in Guadalajara, Jalisco) is a Mexican football manager and former player.

== Career ==
After a 12-year career as a professional footballer with Tecos F.C., Puebla F.C. and Chivas de Guadalajara, Monares managed Cimarrones de Sonora during 2014.
