= Caja Oblatos C.F.D. =

Mexican football club

- Full name: Caja Oblatos Club de Fútbol Deportivo
- Founded: July 2019; 6 years ago
- Ground: Unidad Deportiva Revolución Mexicana; Tonalá, Jalisco
- Capacity: 3,000
- Owner: Caja Popular Oblatos
- Chairman: José Bruno Arce Contreras
- Manager: Ángel Monares
- League: Liga Premier – Serie B
- 2025–26: Regular phase: 9th Final phase: Did not qualify
Home colours	Away colours

Caja Oblatos C.F.D. is a Mexican football club that plays in the Liga Premier – Serie B, the third level division of Mexican football. It is based in Tonalá, Jalisco.

== History ==
The origins of the club go back to a football training center owned by a credit union in Guadalajara, Jalisco, in 2019 it enrolled in the Tercera División de México, the bottom professional category of Mexican football. Since its foundation, the team had an irregular performance in the league, without being able to qualify for the promotion play-off on any occasion.

On June 30, 2023, the team entered the Liga Premier – Serie B through an expansion franchise to increase the number of teams participating in that league.

== Players ==
=== First-team squad ===
As of January 18, 2026

Note: Flags indicate national team as defined under FIFA eligibility rules; some limited exceptions apply. Players may hold more than one non-FIFA nationality.

No.	Pos.	Nation	Player
1	GK	MEX	Pablo López
2	MF	MEX	Gael Ochoa
3	DF	MEX	Jorge Nava
4	DF	MEX	Bruno Arce
5	DF	MEX	Ángel Rizo
6	MF	MEX	Luis Alcalá
7	DF	MEX	Jorge Mendoza
8	DF	MEX	Ángel Zamora
9	FW	MEX	Raúl García
10	FW	MEX	Emmanuel de la Rosa
11	MF	MEX	Carlo Martínez
12	GK	MEX	Antonio Gutiérrez
13	DF	MEX	Jason Moreno
14	DF	MEX	Ángel Vázquez
16	MF	MEX	Jonathan Gollaz
17	MF	MEX	Antonio González
18	DF	MEX	Diego Jiménez

No.	Pos.	Nation	Player
19	FW	MEX	Oswaldo Ramírez
20	MF	MEX	Erwin Carbajal
23	GK	MEX	Bruno Cárdenas
24	MF	MEX	Zahid del Río
25	MF	MEX	Gael González
26	FW	MEX	Lucca Félix
27	MF	MEX	Ian Valenzuela
28	MF	MEX	Francisco Mendoza
29	DF	MEX	Tristán Hinojosa
30	FW	MEX	Eder García
31	FW	MEX	Eric Pinilla
32	DF	MEX	Francisco Nava
33	MF	MEX	René Mendoza
34	MF	MEX	Alan Marín
35	DF	MEX	Juan Pablo Ramos
36	GK	MEX	Noé Márquez

=== Reserve teams ===
Tornados Tlaquepaque (Liga TDP)
Reserve team that plays in the Tercera División de México, the bottom level of the Mexican league system.

Caja Oblatos – Tlajomulco (Liga TDP)
Reserve team that plays in the Tercera División de México, the bottom level of the Mexican league system.
