= Everaldo Begines =

Mexican footballer and manager (born 1971)

Personal information
- Full name: Everaldo Begines Villarreal
- Date of birth: 12 July 1971 (age 55)
- Place of birth: Nuevo Laredo, Tamaulipas, Mexico
- Height: 1.79 m (5 ft 10 1/2 in)
- Position: Forward

Team information
- Current team: Gorilas (Manager)

Senior career*
Years	Team	Apps	(Gls)
1992–1994	Guadalajara	9	(1)
1994–1996	Santos Laguna	53	(8)
1996–1997	Atlético Morelia	24	(3)
1997–2000	León	93	(39)
2000–2001	Cruz Azul	25	(2)
2001–2002	Celaya	30	(5)
2002–2003	Querétaro	28	(5)
2003–2004	Irapuato	32	(8)
2004–2006	Sinaloa	31	(7)

Managerial career
- 2011: Atlético San Francisco
- 2011–2018: León Reserves and Academy
- 2018–2020: León (Women)
- 2026–: Gorilas
- * Club domestic league appearances and goals

Everaldo Begines Villarreal (born 12 July 1971) is a Mexican former professional football manager and player.
