= Nicolás Trejo =

Mexican footballer and manager (born 1975)

Personal information
- Full name: Nicolás Trejo Santoyo
- Date of birth: 25 December 1975 (age 50)
- Place of birth: Salvatierra, Guanajuato, Mexico
- Height: 1.75 m (5 ft 9 in)
- Position: Defender

Team information
- Current team: Atlético Celaya B (Manager)

Senior career*
Years	Team	Apps	(Gls)
1999–2002	Celaya	16	(2)
2002	Querétaro	4	(0)
2003	Celaya	3	(0)
2004	Trotamundos Tijuana	15	(2)
Total		38	(4)

Managerial career
- 2023: Celaya
- 2026–: Atlético Celaya B
- * Club domestic league appearances and goals

Nicolás Trejo Santoyo (born 25 December 1975), known as Nicolás Trejo, is a Mexican football manager and former player.
