= Estadio Gustavo Pacheco Villaseñor =

Stadium in Oaxaca

Coordinates: 18°1′28″N 96°10′6″W

Estadio Tuxtepec Gustavo Pacheco Villaseñor
- Interactive map of Estadio Tuxtepec Gustavo Pacheco Villaseñor
- Location: San Juan Bautista Tuxtepec, Oaxaca, Mexico
- Owner: Diego Francisco Pacheco Cruz
- Operator: Racing de Veracruz; Conejos de Tuxtepec
- Capacity: 15,000
- Surface: Natural grass

Construction
- Opened: 1 April 2005
- Renovated: 2024

Tenants
- Conejos de Tuxtepec (2023–present); Racing de Veracruz (2026–present)

Estadio Tuxtepec Gustavo Pacheco Villaseñor is a football stadium in San Juan Bautista Tuxtepec, Oaxaca, Mexico. It is currently used mostly for football matches. The stadium has a capacity of 15,000 people and opened in 2005.

== History ==
Construction of the stadium began in 2005, driven by a private individual's intention to provide the city with a football stadium capable of hosting a professional team, given that Tuxtepec had historically favored baseball.

For most of its history, the stadium lacked a professional team due to a lack of interest in establishing a squad in the city; consequently, it was used primarily to host municipal and regional league matches, especially given that it has been in operation while still under construction.

In 2026, the stadium began to gain prominence when Racing de Veracruz selected it as an alternative home venue following the closure of its own stadium, the Unidad Deportiva Hugo Sánchez, by the local government of Boca del Río, Veracruz. Following the announcement, Racing signed a three-year lease agreement; consequently, the team's management began maintenance work on the stadium and announced plans to collaborate with the owning family on its construction, which led to some reports claiming the club had purchased the stadium, although these were denied. Among the improvements made following Racing's arrival were a fresh coat of paint, minor repairs, and the installation of a roof over one of the stands to shield fans from the high temperatures in Tuxtepec.

As of 2026, the stadium is still under construction; once completed, it is planned to have a capacity of approximately 25,000 spectators, making it the largest stadium in the state of Oaxaca.
