= Dragones de Oaxaca =

- Full name: Dragones Fútbol Club
- Nickname: Dragones (Dragons)
- Founded: 4 September 2018; 8 years ago
- Ground: Estadio Tecnológico de Oaxaca, Oaxaca, Mexico
- Capacity: 14,598
- Owner: Daniel Ortiz Alcaraz
- Chairman: Daniel Ortiz Alcaraz
- Manager: Víctor Hernández
- League: Liga Premier (Premier A)
- 2025–26: Liga Premier (Serie B); Regular phase: 7th Final phase: Reclassification
| Home colours | Away colours |

Dragones de Oaxaca is a football club that plays in the Premier A, the intermediate branch of the Liga Premier de México, the third tier of Mexican football. It is based in Oaxaca, Mexico.

== History ==
The team was founded in September 2018, but during its first years of existence it participated only in amateur competitions.

Dragones F.C. began competing professionally in the 2020–21 season, being registered in the Liga TDP, the fourth tier of Mexican football.

On May 24, 2025, the team was promoted to the Liga Premier de México after defeating Estudiantes del COBACH F.C. in the regional semi–finals. The team had finished the regular season in first place in its group and had previously eliminated Panteras Neza, Halcones Negros, and Atlético Real Morelos.

After being promoted to the Liga Premier - Serie B, the team moved to a new stadium, playing at the Estadio Tecnológico de Oaxaca, the largest stadium in Oaxaca. The team had previously played at the same venue during the 2019–20 season, and had also previously played in other towns in the state of Oaxaca, such as Santa María del Tule and Zimatlán de Álvarez.

== Players ==
=== First-team squad ===
As of 9 September 2026

Note: Flags indicate national team as defined under FIFA eligibility rules; some limited exceptions apply. Players may hold more than one non-FIFA nationality.

| No. | Pos. | Nation | Player |
|---|---|---|---|
| 1 | GK | MEX | Alfredo Rivera |
| 2 | DF | MEX | Juan Pablo Lázaro |
| 3 | DF | MEX | Irving Camal |
| 4 | DF | MEX | Alfonso Pérez |
| 5 | DF | MEX | Víctor Reyes |
| 6 | DF | MEX | Gandhi Manzanares |
| 7 | FW | MEX | Edwin Orrantia |
| 8 | MF | MEX | Marco Rodríguez |
| 9 | FW | MEX | Andrew Martínez |
| 10 | FW | MEX | Sebastián Martínez |
| 11 | MF | MEX | Diego Espinosa |
| 12 | DF | MEX | Santiago Melo |
| 14 | MF | MEX | Hammuravy Pinzón |
| 15 | DF | MEX | Alexander Arias |

| No. | Pos. | Nation | Player |
|---|---|---|---|
| 17 | FW | MEX | Farid Patjane |
| 18 | MF | BRA | Pablo Nascimento |
| 20 | MF | MEX | Osvaldo Plascencia |
| 21 | FW | MEX | Eduardo Coronado |
| 23 | MF | MEX | Sergio Tinoco |
| 24 | MF | MEX | Jesús Barredas |
| 25 | DF | MEX | Alexander Cruz |
| 26 | MF | MEX | Nery Muñoz |
| 27 | FW | MEX | Diego Oliva |
| 29 | FW | MEX | Jonathan Chávez |
| 30 | GK | MEX | Erubiel Castro |
| 31 | GK | MEX | Axel López |
| 33 | DF | MEX | Jesús Haro |
| 40 | FW | MEX | Isidro Suárez |

== Reserves ==
=== Napoli Tabasco-Academia Dragones ===
Reserve team that plays in the Liga TDP, the fourth level of Mexican football.

=== Dragones de Oaxaca TDP ===
Reserve team that plays in the Liga TDP.
