= Unidad Deportiva Francisco Gómez Palacio =

Multi-use stadium in Gómez Palacio, Durango, Mexico

The Unidad Deportiva Francisco Gómez Palacio is a multi-use stadium in Gómez Palacio, Durango, Mexico. It is currently used mostly for football matches and is the home stadium for Internacional Laguna. The stadium has a capacity of 4,000 people.
