= C.D. Ayense =

Ayense
- Full name: Club Deportivo Ayense
- Founded: 1988; 38 years ago 2019; 7 years ago (refounded)
- Ground: Estadio Chino Rivas; Ayotlán, Jalisco
- Capacity: 3,500
- Owner(s): Club Deportivo Ayense, A.C.
- Manager: Conrado Castillo
- League: Liga Premier (Premier B)
- 2025–26: Liga Premier (Serie B); Regular phase: 6th Final phase: Reclassification
Home colours	Away colours

Club Deportivo Ayense, A.C. is a Mexican football club based in Ayotlán, Jalisco that competes in the Premier B, the bottom branch of the Liga Premier de México, the third level division of Mexican football.

== History ==
The team was founded for the first time in 1988, that year they achieved their first title and promoted to the Segunda División de México. In 1990, the team was relegated to the Segunda División "B", but, in 1991 they won the divisional title and returned to the Segunda División, in the same season, the Ayense was invited to the Primera División de México in a promotional playoff. The team disappeared for the first time in the mid-2000s.

In 2019, the team returned to professional football after an agreement between the municipal government and an entrepreneur located in the United States. The club was enrolled in the Tercera División de México with the name Club Deportivo Ayense A.C.

In the 2022–23 season, the team had its best performance since its refoundation in 2019. Ayense reached the North Zone semifinal, where they were defeated by Poza Rica in a penalty shootout. Although the team failed to promote from the category, its good performance led to the club being invited to participate in the Liga Premier – Serie B on June 15, 2023.

== Players ==
=== First-team squad ===
As of 11 September 2026

Note: Flags indicate national team as defined under FIFA eligibility rules; some limited exceptions apply. Players may hold more than one non-FIFA nationality.

No.	Pos.	Nation	Player
2	DF	MEX	Jorge González
3	DF	MEX	Ángel Parra
4	DF	MEX	Marco Pérez
5	DF	MEX	Jesús Martínez
6	MF	MEX	Roberto Ríos
7	FW	MEX	Jonathan Córdova
8	FW	MEX	Edson Castro
9	FW	MEX	Nelson Rodríguez
10	MF	MEX	Guillermo García
11	MF	MEX	Ramón Lizárraga
12	GK	MEX	Karol Castellanos
13	GK	MEX	Dimas Barreda
14	FW	MEX	Ailton Rangel
16	MF	MEX	Edgar Hernández
17	GK	MEX	Pablo Vargas
19	FW	MEX	Daniel Monsivaís
20	DF	MEX	Christian Córdova

No.	Pos.	Nation	Player
21	MF	MEX	Abel Flores
23	DF	MEX	Cristian Gómez
25	MF	MEX	Darío Hernández
27	DF	MEX	Emmanuel Ramírez
28	MF	MEX	Karol Anguiano
29	MF	MEX	Ruy Martínez
30	MF	MEX	Anatolio Rangel
39	DF	MEX	Ángel Silva
40	MF	MEX	Ángel Flores
41	DF	MEX	Osvaldo Lemus
42	MF	MEX	Mateo González
43	MF	MEX	Christian León
44	MF	MEX	Armando Mendoza
45	DF	MEX	Erick Rocha
46	MF	MEX	Jesús Zaragoza
48	GK	MEX	Toribio González

== Honors ==
- Segunda División "B"

1990-91

- Tercera División

1988-89
