= Acámbaro F.C. =

Mexican football club

- Full name: Acámbaro Fútbol Club
- Nicknames: Lobos (Wolves); La manada (The Herd)
- Founded: 27 June 2025; 15 months ago
- Ground: Estadio Fray Salvador Rangel; Acámbaro, Guanajuato
- Capacity: 3,500
- Owner: Ricardo Andrade
- Chairman: Ricardo Andrade
- Manager: Francisco Tena Garduño
- League: Liga Premier (Premier A)
- 2025–26: Liga Premier (Serie B); Regular phase: 5th Final phase: Reclassification
Home colours	Away colours

Acámbaro F.C. is a Mexican football club that plays in the Premier A, the intermediate branch of the Liga Premier de México, the third tier of Mexican football. It is based in Acámbaro, Guanajuato.

== History ==
In February 2025, the municipal government of Acámbaro, Guanajuato began negotiations to bring a professional football team to its town. Finally, in June, an agreement was reached with the Mexico City-based team CDM, the club accepted the offer as it had better financial and sporting conditions than those in the Mexican capital.

On June 27, 2025, the team's relocation to Acámbaro, Guanajuato and new identity was announced and became official, and was renamed as Acámbaro F.C. The club was registered in the Liga Premier - Serie B, taking the place previously used by CDM, in addition to inheriting the club's board of directors, coaching staff, and roster.

== Stadium ==
The Estadio Fray Salvador Rangel is a multi-use stadium in Acámbaro, Guanajuato. It is currently used mostly for football matches. The stadium has a capacity of 3,500 people.

== Players ==
=== First-team squad ===
As of 8 September 2026

Note: Flags indicate national team as defined under FIFA eligibility rules; some limited exceptions apply. Players may hold more than one non-FIFA nationality.

No.	Pos.	Nation	Player
1	GK	MEX	Marco Guadarrama
2	DF	MEX	Edwin López
3	DF	MEX	Oswaldo Solorio
5	DF	MEX	Roberto Martínez
7	MF	MEX	Carlos Morón
8	MF	MEX	Luis Islas
9	FW	MEX	Alexander Pozos
10	MF	MEX	Diego Domínguez
12	GK	MEX	Luis Manuel García
13	MF	MEX	Víctor Sánchez
14	DF	MEX	Christian Benítez

No.	Pos.	Nation	Player
15	MF	MEX	Alejandro Islas
16	DF	MEX	Bryan Sandoval
18	MF	MEX	Francisco Estudillo
19	DF	MEX	Ignacio Ruiz
21	MF	MEX	Bryan Cáceres
23	DF	MEX	Hugo Hernández
24	MF	MEX	Santiago Domínguez
25	MF	MEX	Carlos Valdés
26	FW	MEX	Diego Cuatepitzi
27	DF	MEX	Jorge López
35	MF	MEX	Andrik García
