= Racing de Veracruz =

Mexican association football club

- Full name: Racing de Veracruz
- Nickname: El Monstruo Morado (The Purple Monster)
- Founded: 2 May 2023; 3 years ago (as Racing Fútbol Club Porto Palmeiras)
- Stadium: Estadio Gustavo Pacheco Villaseñor
- Capacity: 15,000
- Owner: Racing Sports Holding
- Chairman: Maclovio Yáñez
- Manager: Héctor Altamirano
- League: Liga Premier (Primera Premier)
- 2025–26: Regular phase: 1st of 13 (Group III); Final phase: Quarter-finals
- Website: www.racingdeveracruz.com.mx
Home colours	Away colours

Racing de Veracruz is a professional football club temporarily based in San Juan Bautista Tuxtepec, Oaxaca. The club competes in Liga Premier (Primera Premier), the third level of Mexican football, and plays its home matches at Estadio Gustavo Pacheco Villaseñor. Founded in 2023 as Racing Fútbol Club Porto Palmeiras, the club adopted its current name in 2024.

== History ==
On 5 December 2019, the Veracruz metro area was left without representation in Mexican football after the dissolution of Tiburones Rojos de Veracruz, a team that played in the Liga MX. Later, some clubs emerged seeking to fill the void left by the original team, such as Atlético Veracruz and Club Veracruzano de Fútbol Tiburón, however, both clubs failed in their attempt to attract fans from the city.

In March 2023, the Government of Veracruz began the reconstruction works of the Estadio Luis "Pirata" Fuente, with the aim of making it attractive to new investors interested in bringing a team to the city. Meanwhile, Porto Palmeiras, a local football school, began negotiations with the aim of getting a professional team for the city. In April 2023, it reached an agreement with Racing City Group, a Qatari conglomerate that owns teams around the world.

On 23 April 2023, the agreement between Porto Palmeiras and Racing City Group was announced, the new team was called Racing Porto Palmeiras.

On 30 June 2023, the team was accepted into the Liga Premier - Serie A, being placed in Group 2. The club signed Héctor Jair Real as the first team manager.

The team played its first official match on 12 August 2023, in that game Racing defeated C.F. La Piedad by a score of 1–2, Fabrizio Díaz scored the first goal in the history of the Veracruz team.

On 10 April 2024, Racing Porto Palmeiras won its first official title by being champion of the Copa Conecta, a tournament that pits 32 teams from Liga Premier and Liga TDP. The team won the title after defeating Diablos Tesistán 0–2.

On 28 June 2024, the team was renamed Racing de Veracruz because the board decided to end its relationship with the Racing City Group in addition to seeking the club's identification with the city and not only with the football school that was part of the team's founding.

In July 2024, the owners of Racing de Veracruz bought Tepatitlán F.C., a team that participates in the Liga de Expansión MX, with the aim of establishing the Racing in the second tier of Mexican football starting with the 2025–26 season. However, in February 2025, the board announced that the team would remain in Tepatitlán due to the limited chances of receiving the Liga de Expansión approval for the team's relocation to Veracruz.

After Racing's disassociation with Tepatitlán, the board focused on strengthening its own sports structure, creating a new subsidiary team called F.C. Racing, now Racing de Veracruz B which competes in the Liga Premier B from the 2025–26 season. A second reserves team was also created, which participates in the Liga TDP.

In February 2026, the club was evicted from its stadium, the Unidad Deportiva Hugo Sánchez in Boca del Río, Veracruz, following the facility's closure in the wake of a violent clash between Racing and Celaya F.C. fans that resulted in one fatality; consequently, Racing finished the 2025–26 season playing at the Mexican Football Federation's facilities in Toluca. Although the team tried to negotiate the handover of the venue, the government rejected their request and maintained the closure of the sports complex.

In addition to the lack of a home venue in Veracruz, a new team, Piratas F.C., was founded in the city for the 2026–27 season; this team secured full government support and exclusive use of the Estadio Luis "Pirata" Fuente, the city's only other venue certified to host professional matches, making it unfeasible for Racing to remain in the city. Consequently, on 14 August 2026, Racing announced its relocation to the city of San Juan Bautista Tuxtepec, Oaxaca, located approximately 150 kilometers (93 miles) from Veracruz.

== Honours ==
Domestic
Type	Competition	Titles	Seasons	Runners-up
Lower levels FMF	Copa Conecta	1	2024	—

== Players ==
As of 2 September 2026

Note: Flags indicate national team as defined under FIFA eligibility rules; some limited exceptions apply. Players may hold more than one non-FIFA nationality.

No.	Pos.	Nation	Player
1	GK	MEX	Emiliano Palomo
2	DF	MEX	Luis Ocón
3	DF	MEX	Jair Cerda
5	DF	MEX	Brayan Monroy
7	FW	MEX	David García
8	MF	MEX	Mario Guerrero
9	FW	MEX	Sergio Vázquez
10	MF	MEX	Juan Pablo Rangel
11	MF	COL	Andrés Preciado
13	DF	MEX	Luis González
14	MF	MEX	Álvaro Vidales
15	DF	MEX	Eduardo Moreno
16	MF	MEX	Alejandro Zamora
17	MF	MEX	Alan Vázquez

No.	Pos.	Nation	Player
18	MF	MEX	Jefferson Barojas
19	FW	ARG	Juan Román Pucheta (on loan from Argentinos Juniors)
22	FW	MEX	Ander Casas
23	GK	MEX	Diego Reyes
24	DF	MEX	Diego Luna
25	MF	MEX	Gerardo Padilla
26	MF	MEX	Diego Núñez
27	MF	MEX	Luis Valdez
32	MF	MEX	Iván Hernández
33	DF	MEX	Antonio Martínez
35	MF	MEX	Jassiel Ruiz
38	MF	MEX	Gerardo Gómez
47	MF	MEX	Brandón Rodríguez
48	MF	MEX	Alejandro Ramos

== Reserves ==
=== Racing de Veracruz B ===
Reserve team that competes in the Liga Premier (Premier B). Formerly known as Fútbol Club Racing, the team won the Copa Promesas LMX-LP in 2025 and also won the 2026 Copa Conecta.

=== Racing de Veracruz TDP ===
Reserve team that competes in the Liga TDP.

== Managers ==
- (Mexico) Héctor Jair Real (2023–2024)
- (Mexico) Martín Calderón (2024)
- (Mexico) Alejandro Pérez (2024–2025)
- (Mexico) Marco Angúlo (2025)
- (Mexico) Gastón Obledo (2026)
- (Mexico) Israel Hernández Pat (2026)
- (Mexico) Héctor Altamirano (2026–)
