= Artesanos Metepec F.C. =

- Full name: Artesanos Metepec Fútbol Club
- Nickname: Los Artesanos (The artisans)
- Founded: August 2022; 4 years ago
- Ground: Unidad Deportiva Alarcón Hisojo; Metepec, State of Mexico
- Capacity: 2,000
- Owner(s): Santiago Murleiro; Víctor Venice Osorio
- Chairman: Edson Esquivel
- Manager: Gustavo Contreras
- League: Liga Premier (Premier A)
- 2025–26: Liga Premier (Serie B); Regular phase: 1st Final phase: Champions
Home colours	Away colours

Artesanos Metepec Fútbol Club is a Mexican football club based in Metepec, State of Mexico that competes in the Premier A, the intermediate branch of the Liga Premier de México, the third tier of Mexican football.

== History ==
The club was founded in August 2022, with the support of the Metepec City Council and a group of local businessmen to have a team that would represent the town in Mexican professional football. The team officially debuted on August 27, 2022, defeating Deportivo Zitácuaro with a score of 3–1.

Artesanos Metepec finished its first season as the best team in Group VI, getting its pass to the promotion playoffs. Successively the team eliminated Fuerza Mazahua, Cruz Azul Lagunas, Progreso F.C. and Faraones de Texcoco, finally, on May 13, 2023, the team was promoted to the Liga Premier de México, achieving its first promotion in its first season of existence.

== Players ==
=== First-team squad ===
As of 7 September 2026

Note: Flags indicate national team as defined under FIFA eligibility rules; some limited exceptions apply. Players may hold more than one non-FIFA nationality.

No.	Pos.	Nation	Player
1	GK	MEX	Darco Zaragoza
2	DF	MEX	Héctor Hernández
3	DF	MEX	Francisco Hernández
4	DF	MEX	Diego García
5	MF	MEX	Óscar Altamirano
6	MF	MEX	Marcos Cruz
7	MF	MEX	David Flores
8	MF	MEX	Carlos Rodríguez
10	FW	MEX	Joab Ruiz
11	MF	MEX	Giovanny León
12	DF	MEX	Carlos Cano
13	MF	MEX	Aldair Ángeles
14	DF	MEX	Leonel Castillo
15	MF	MEX	Ricardo Bonilla

No.	Pos.	Nation	Player
16	MF	MEX	Ever Flores
17	MF	MEX	Carlos Galicia
18	MF	MEX	Juan Pablo Rodríguez
19	MF	MEX	Enrique Gómez
21	DF	MEX	Leonardo Bonilla
22	FW	MEX	Luis Rivas
23	GK	MEX	Víctor Álvarez
24	FW	MEX	Alan Mata
25	FW	MEX	Rafael Rivas
26	MF	MEX	Isaác Serrano
27	MF	MEX	Alberto Támez
28	MF	MEX	Pablo Herrera
29	MF	MEX	Enrique López
30	DF	MEX	Diego Gutiérrez

== Reserves ==
=== Artesanos Metepec TDP ===
Reserve team that plays in the Liga TDP, the fourth level of Mexican football.

=== Artesanos Huixquilucan ===
Reserve team that plays in the Liga TDP.

== Honours ==
- Liga Premier de México (Serie B)

Winners: 2025–26
