= Ayotlán =

- Municipality and town
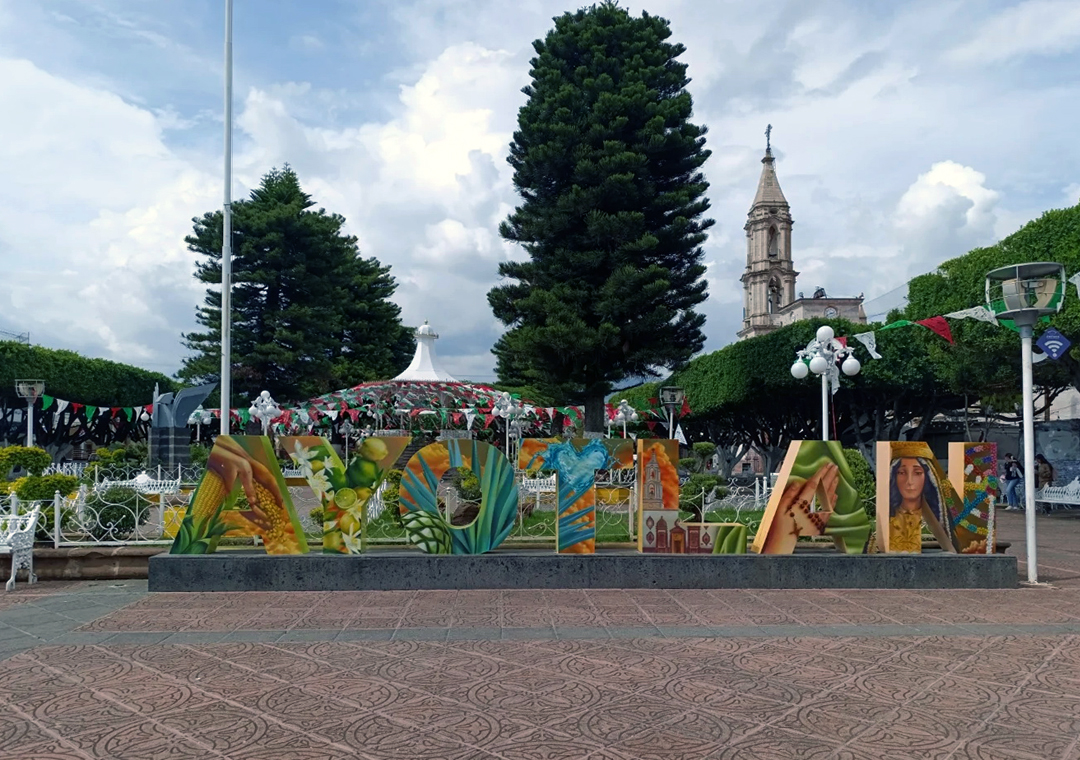

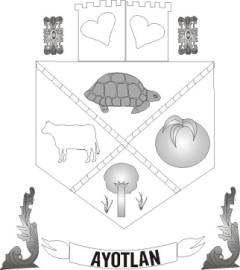
- Coat of arms

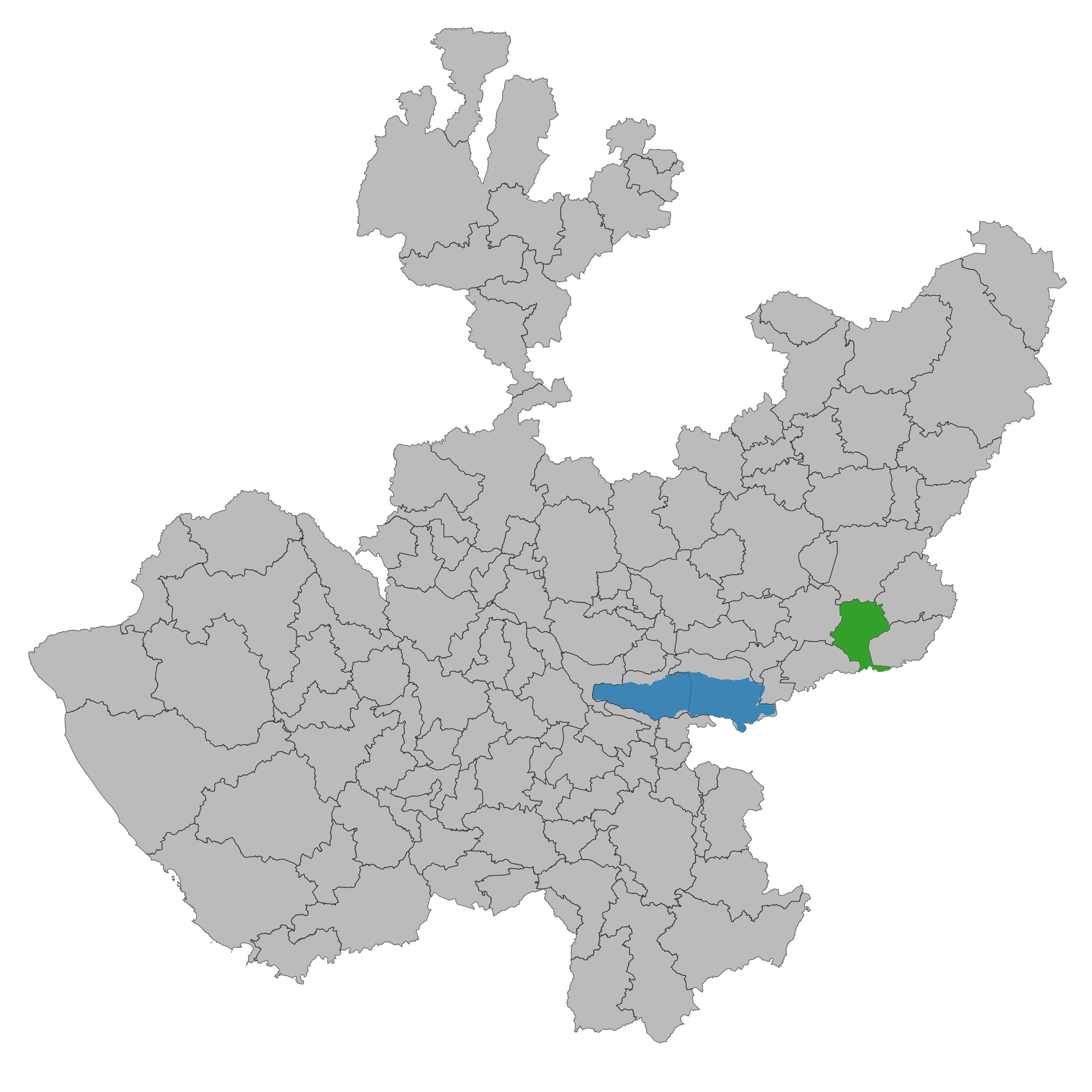
- Location of the municipality in Jalisco

- Location in Mexico
- Coordinates: 20°20′N 102°15′W
- Country: Mexico
- State: Jalisco

Area
  - Total: 430.9 km^{2} (166.4 sq mi)
  - Town: 4 km^{2} (1.5 sq mi)

Population (2020 census)
  - Total: 41,552
  - Density: 96.43/km^{2} (249.8/sq mi)
  - Town: 13,810
  - Town density: 3,500/km^{2} (8,900/sq mi)

Ayotlán is a municipality and town in Jalisco in central-western Mexico. The municipality covers an area of 430.9 km^{2}.

As of 2005, the municipality had a total population of 35,150.

== Etymology ==
Ayotlán comes from "Ayotl" (its former name) and means "place of turtles" or "squashes".

== History ==
In 1583 the Spaniards called it "Ayo el Chico" to distinguish it from large town that was near San Pedro Piedra Gorda, in the now state of Guanajuato. In the year 620 and 623 came the Aztecs found the place already populated by indigenous groups. About 10 km south of the town is a hill called "Old Town" which was the first seat of the population. Before the conquest had approximately 15,000 Indians living scattered throughout the Valley Coin. Manor depended Coin, whose capital was Tototlan. Worshiped "Ixtlacateolt", highly revered deity in the contours of Chapala lake. The natives had erected shrines or "cues" on the hill of the Villas. Cristóbal de Olid sent by Hernán Cortés in the conquest of Michoacán in 1521, and registered as a resident grabbed the Ayotl natural. Valley Coin was given instructed to Juan de Villaseñor the Elder, who ruled 9 years. When Nuño de Guzmán arrived in the population, the 16 February 1530, ignored the rights of Villaseñor. Ayotl was then under the jurisdiction of the Nueva Galicia. The people of Ayotl participated in the war Miztán in 1541 then was encomendero Verdugo Fco. They burned the church and their houses and went back to Peñoles Coin. The number of natives amounted to 12,000 rebels. On October 26 the same year, personally Viceroy Antonio de Mendoza besieged El Penol with a powerful army and gave them so fierce battle that nearly ended with them.

The town was established on October 8, 1884.

== Geography ==
=== Location ===
Ayotlán is located at coordinates 20 ° 20 '05 "to 20 ° 37' 30" north latitude and 102 ° 15 '00 "102 ° 39' 40" west longitude at an altitude of 1.630 meters above sea level. The town is bordered on the north by the municipalities of the Atotonilco El Alto, Arandas and Jesús María, on the east by the municipalities of Jesús María, Degollado the south by the municipality of Yurécuaro the west by the municipalities of La Barca and Atotonilco El Alto.

=== Localities ===
has over 100 towns of Acahuales la colonia de villafuerte, La Isla, El Palo Blanco, la ladera grande, la ladera chica. (San Miguel de Acahuales), Agua Blanca, Ayotlán, Betania, Cañada de San Ignacio, Carboneras, Carretas, Colonia Lázaro Cárdenas (El Sicuicho), El Bajío (Bajío de Tejas), El Caracol, El Chaveño, El Edén, El Fraile, El Jaral, El Ojo de Agua, El Rosario, Granja Ballesteros, Granja la Gaby, La Concepción, Las Higueras, El Venado, El Guayabo, Mirandillas, El Volantin, La Raya, La Nopalera and La Esperanza.
