= Unidad Deportiva Hugo Sánchez =

- Interactive map of Unidad Deportiva Hugo Sánchez
- Full name: Unidad Deportiva Hugo Sánchez
- Location: Boca del Río, Veracruz, Mexico
- Coordinates: 19°6′9″N 96°6′27″W
- Owner: City of Boca del Río
- Capacity: 4,000
- Surface: Natural grass

Construction
- Opened: 1987
- Renovated: 2014

Tenants
- Racing de Veracruz (2023–2026); Atlético Boca del Río (1988–2026)

Unidad Deportiva Hugo Sánchez is a multi-use stadium in Boca del Río, Veracruz, Mexico. It is currently used mostly for football matches. The stadium has a capacity of 4,000 people and opened in 1987.

In February 2026, the Unidad Deportiva was closed by the government following a fight between Racing de Veracruz and Celaya F.C. fans that resulted in one person's death. Despite requests from Racing de Veracruz and civil society for the reopening of the Unidad, it has remained closed since February 2026.
