= Mikel Arriola =

Mexican lawyer

Mikel Andoni Arriola Peñalosa
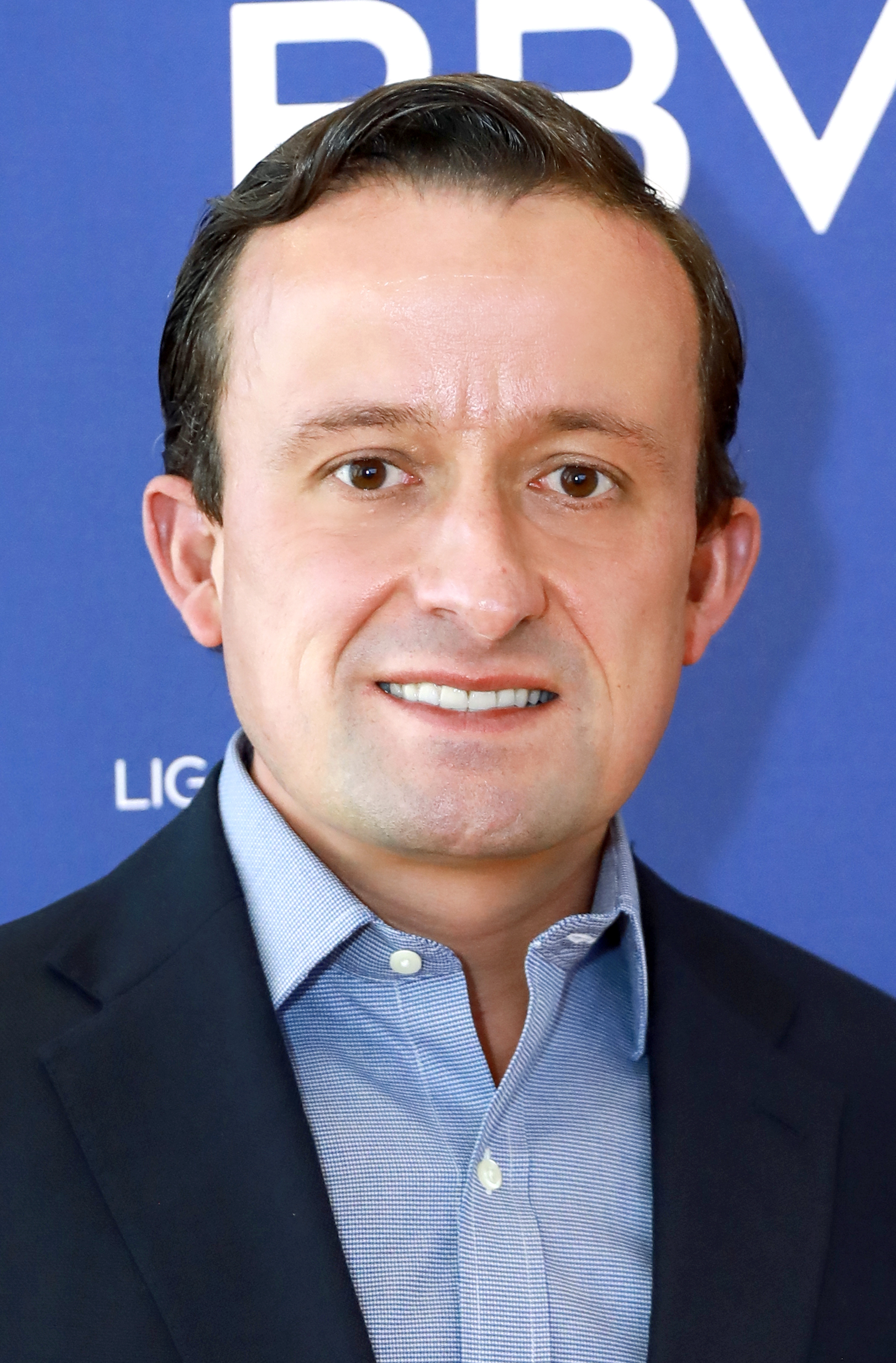

President Commissioner of the Mexican Football Federation
- Incumbent
- Assumed office 13 December 2024
- Preceded by: Juan Carlos Rodríguez Bas

Executive President of Liga MX
- Incumbent
- Assumed office 4 January 2021
- Preceded by: Enrique Bonilla

Director General of the Mexican Social Security Institute
- In office 8 February 2016 – 6 December 2017
- President: Enrique Peña Nieto
- Preceded by: José Antonio González Anaya
- Succeeded by: Tuffic Miguel Ortega

Federal Commissioner for Protection against Sanitary Risks
- In office 7 April 2011 – 8 February 2016
- President: Felipe Calderón; Enrique Peña Nieto
- Preceded by: Miguel Ángel Toscano
- Succeeded by: Julio Sánchez y Tépoz

Personal details
- Born: September 25, 1975 (age 51) Mexico City, Mexico
- Party: Institutional Revolutionary Party
- Education: Anáhuac University

Mikel Andoni Arriola Peñalosa (born 25 September 1975 in Mexico City) is a Mexican lawyer, political scientist, and former public official. After serving in the extended cabinet of President Enrique Peña Nieto, he was the candidate of the Institutional Revolutionary Party for Head of Government of Mexico City in 2018. Since 2021, he has held executive positions in Mexican football, including Liga MX and the Mexican Football Federation.

== Political career ==
Arriola served as Director General of Revenue Planning in 2005 and later headed the Tax Legislation Unit at the Secretariat of Finance and Public Credit.

=== Federal Commission for Protection against Sanitary Risks ===
He served as Federal Commissioner for Protection against Sanitary Risks (COFEPRIS) from 2011 to 2016.

=== Mexican Social Security Institute ===
In 2016, he became Director General of the Mexican Social Security Institute (IMSS). During his administration, the institute reported its first financial surplus in eight years.

=== Candidate for Head of Government of Mexico City ===
On 7 December 2017, Arriola resigned as Director General of IMSS. The same day, he registered as a pre-candidate for Head of Government of Mexico City for the Institutional Revolutionary Party.

He was officially registered as the PRI's sole pre-candidate on 15 December 2017.

On 11 March 2018, he formally registered his candidacy before the Electoral Institute of Mexico City.

The election results placed him in third place with 12.8% of the vote.

== Liga MX ==
Arriola assumed the executive presidency of Liga MX in December 2020.

Under his leadership, collaboration with Major League Soccer expanded, including competitions such as the Leagues Cup and Campeones Cup.

In 2024, Liga MX recorded over 7.79 million attendees, ranking among the most attended leagues globally.

== Mexican Football Federation ==
On 13 December 2024, following the resignation of Juan Carlos Rodríguez, Arriola was appointed President Commissioner of the Mexican Football Federation.

== CONCACAF ==
In March 2025, Arriola was elected as North America's representative to the CONCACAF Council during its 40th Ordinary Congress.
