= 21st federal electoral district of Mexico City =

Federal electoral district of Mexico

Mexico City's 21st
- Electoral district of the Chamber of Deputies of Mexico

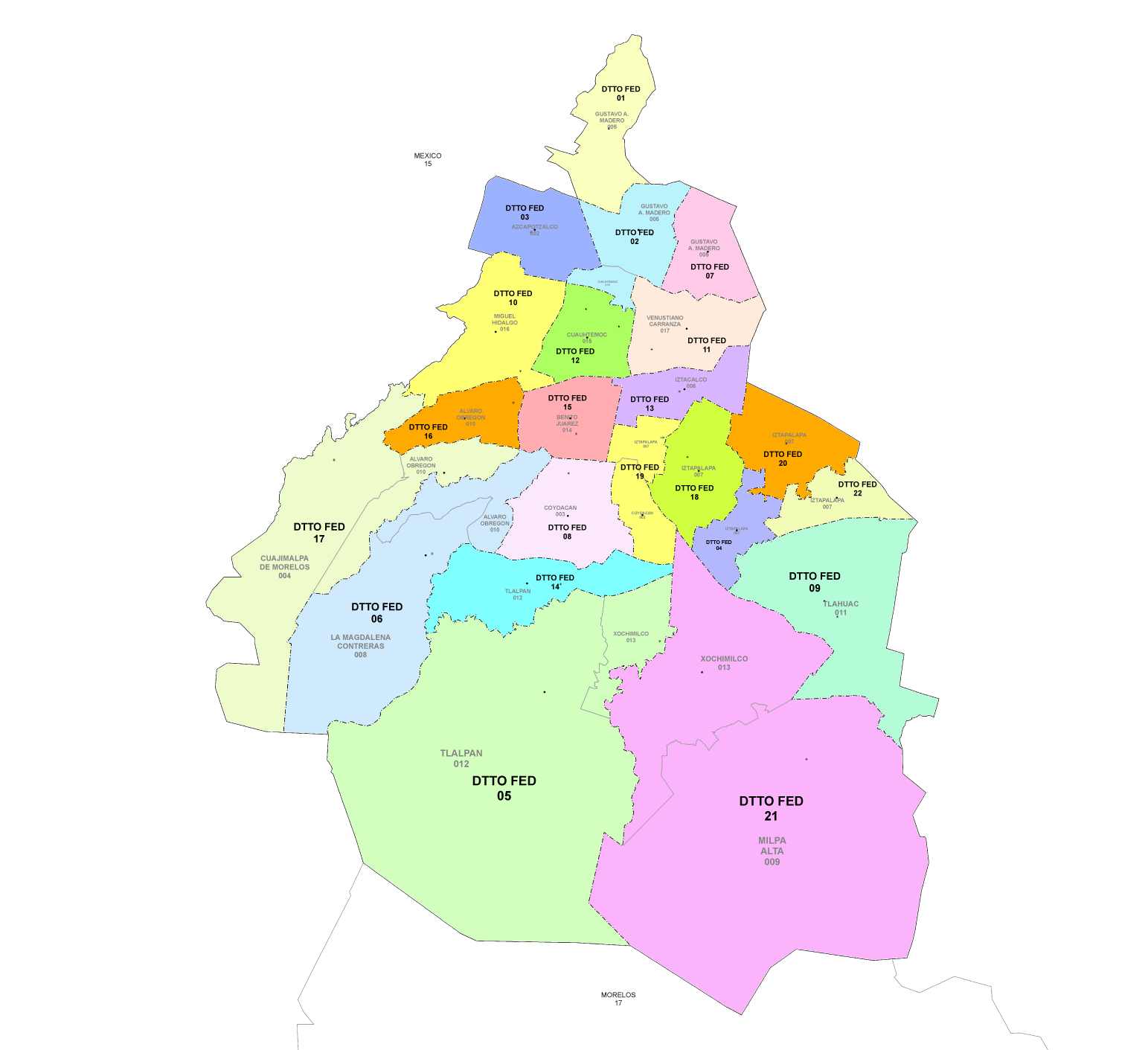
- 21st district since 2023

Incumbent
- Member: José Carlos Acosta Ruiz
- Party: ▌Morena
- Congress: 66th (2024–2027)

District
- State: Mexico City
- Head town: Xochimilco
- Coordinates: 19°16′30″N 99°08′20″W
- Covers: Xochimilco (part), Milpa Alta
- PR region: Fourth
- Precincts: 136
- Population: 436,319 (2020 census)

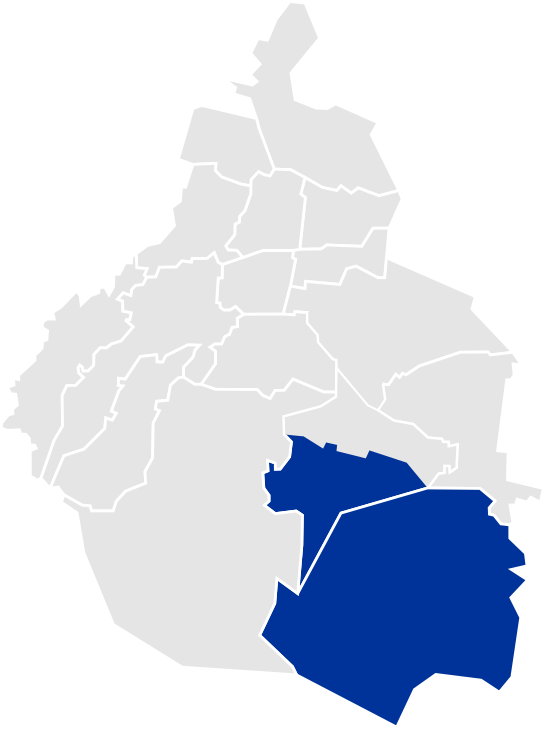
2005–2017 21st district shaded blue

The 21st federal electoral district of Mexico City (Spanish: Distrito electoral federal 21 de la Ciudad de México; previously "of the Federal District") is one of the 300 electoral districts into which Mexico is divided for elections to the federal Chamber of Deputies and one of the 22 currently operational districts in Mexico City.

It elects one deputy to the lower house of Congress for each three-year legislative session by means of the first-past-the-post system. Votes cast in the district also count towards the calculation of proportional representation ("plurinominal") deputies elected from the fourth region.

The current member for the district, elected in the 2024 general election, is José Carlos Acosta Ruiz of the National Regeneration Movement (Morena).

== District territory ==
Under the 2023 districting plan adopted by the National Electoral Institute (INE), which is to be used for the 2024, 2027 and 2030 federal elections, the 21st district covers 136 electoral precincts (secciones electorales) between the borough (alcaldía) of Milpa Alta and the bulk of Xochimilco (the north-western portion of that borough is assigned to the 5th district).

The district reported a population of 436,319 in the 2020 census.

== Previous districting schemes ==
Evolution of electoral district numbers
	1974	1978	1996	2005	2017	2023
Mexico City (Federal District)	27	40	30	27	24	22
Chamber of Deputies	196	300				

2017–2022

In the 2017 plan, the 21st district comprised 87 precincts in the south of Xochimilco and the whole (44 precincts) of Milpa Alta.

2005–2017

Between 2005 and 2017, the district covered the south-west of Xochimilco (85 precincts) and the whole of Milpa Alta (44 precincts).

1996–2005

Under the 1996 scheme, the district covered the south-east of Álvaro Obregón and the west of Coyoacán.

1978–1996

The districting scheme in force from 1978 to 1996 was the result of the 1977 electoral reforms, which increased the number of single-member seats in the Chamber of Deputies from 196 to 300. Under that plan, the Federal District's seat allocation rose from 27 to 40. The 21st district comprised portions of the boroughs of Iztapalapa and Iztacalco.

== Deputies returned to Congress ==
(Mexico) National parties
- Current
- PAN
- PRI
- PT
- PVEM
- MC
- Morena
- PAZ
- Somos
- Defunct or local only
- PLM
- PNR
- PRM
- PNM
- PP
- PPS
- PARM
- PFCRN
- CON
- PANAL
- PSD
- PES
- PES
- PRD

Mexico City's 21st district
Election	Deputy	Party	Term	Legislature
1961	Óscar Ramírez Mijares	Institutional Revolutionary Party	1961–1964	45th Congress
1964	Miguel Cobián Pérez	Institutional Revolutionary Party	1964–1967	46th Congress
1967	Óscar Ramírez Mijares	Institutional Revolutionary Party	1967–1970	47th Congress
1970	Héctor Ayala Guerrero	Institutional Revolutionary Party	1970–1973	48th Congress
1973	Mariano Araiza Zayas	Institutional Revolutionary Party	1973–1976	49th Congress
1976	Martha Andrade de Del Rosal	Institutional Revolutionary Party	1976–1979	50th Congress
1979	Enrique Gómez Corchado	Institutional Revolutionary Party	1979–1982	51st Congress
1982	Everardo Gámiz Fernández	Institutional Revolutionary Party	1982–1985	52nd Congress
1985	Ofelia Casillas Ontiveros	Institutional Revolutionary Party	1985–1988	53rd Congress
1988	Víctor Sarabía Luna	Institutional Revolutionary Party	1988–1991	54th Congress
1991	Everardo Gámiz Fernández	Institutional Revolutionary Party	1991–1994	55th Congress
1994	Ofelia Casillas Ontiveros	Institutional Revolutionary Party	1994–1997	56th Congress
1997	Pedro Salcedo García	Party of the Democratic Revolution	1997–2000	57th Congress
2000	Héctor González Reza	National Action Party (Mexico)	2000–2003	58th Congress
2003	Miguel Ángel Toscano	National Action Party (Mexico)	2003–2006	59th Congress
2006	Alejandro Sánchez Camacho	Party of the Democratic Revolution	2006–2009	60th Congress
2009	Avelino Méndez Rangel	Party of the Democratic Revolution	2009–2012	61st Congress
2012	Alejandro Sánchez Camacho	Party of the Democratic Revolution	2012–2015	62nd Congress
2015	Claudia Villanueva Huerta	Ecologist Green Party of Mexico	2015–2018	63rd Congress
2018	Flor Ivone Morales Miranda (Note: Morales Miranda resigned her seat on 17/07/2019.); Karen Ivette Audiffred Fernández	National Regeneration Movement	2018–2019; 2019–2021	64th Congress
2021	Flor Ivone Morales Miranda	National Regeneration Movement	2021–2024	65th Congress
2024	José Carlos Acosta Ruiz	National Regeneration Movement	2024–2027	66th Congress

== Presidential elections ==
Mexico City's 21st district
Election	District won by	Party or coalition	%
2018	Andrés Manuel López Obrador	Juntos Haremos Historia	68.7441
2024	Claudia Sheinbaum Pardo	Sigamos Haciendo Historia	66.5073
