= Barrios Mágicos =

Group of touristic areas in México City

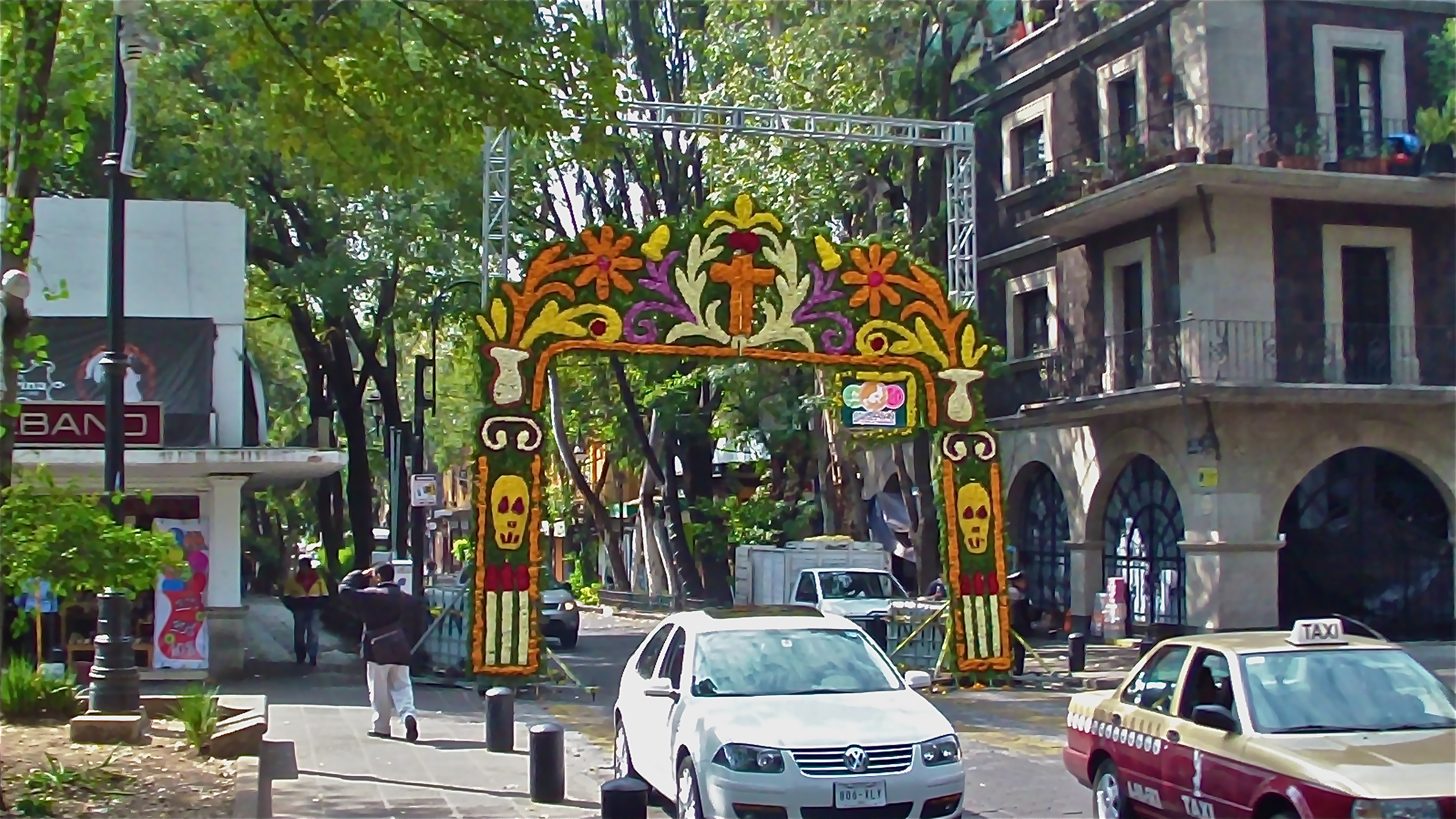
Coyoacán, one of the Barrios Mágicos

The Barrios Mágicos are twenty-one areas in Mexico City highlighted by the city government to attract tourism; the program is sponsored by the city government and is patterned after the "Pueblos Mágicos" (Magical Towns) program of the Mexican federal government. However, one difference is that the city does not require the "barrios" to make improvements in their appearances to be accepted. The first of the barrios were named in 2011 by city Secretary of Tourism Alejandro Rojas Díaz Durán. Each of the twenty-one named neighborhoods received stylistic scrolls with the accreditation with acceptance by registration in the city's official gazette, Gaceta Oficial del DF. The first to receive its scroll was Santa María Magdalena Atlitic.

The twenty-one neighborhoods include the historic center of Coyoacán, the Roma-Condesa zone, the historic center of Xochimilco, San Ángel, San Agustín de la Cuevas (historic center of Tlalpan), Santa María la Ribera, Zona Rosa, Garibaldi, Villa de Guadalupe, Mixcoac, Tacubaya, Santa María Magdalena Atlitic, historic center of Azcapotzalco, La Merced, Mixquic, historic center of Cuajimalpa, San Pedro Atocpan, Pueblo Culhuacán, Tacuba, Santa Julia and the historic center of Iztacalco. The city's Secretary of Tourism plans on having thirty such neighborhoods, with areas such as the Los Dinamos ecological reserve nominated.

The neighborhoods have been declared only on paper as neither the city nor the boroughs have the money to promote them. Circa 2011 the program's legality was questioned by Carlo Pizano, then president of the ALDF Tourism Commission, because the designations were made without prior public publication.

== Gallery ==
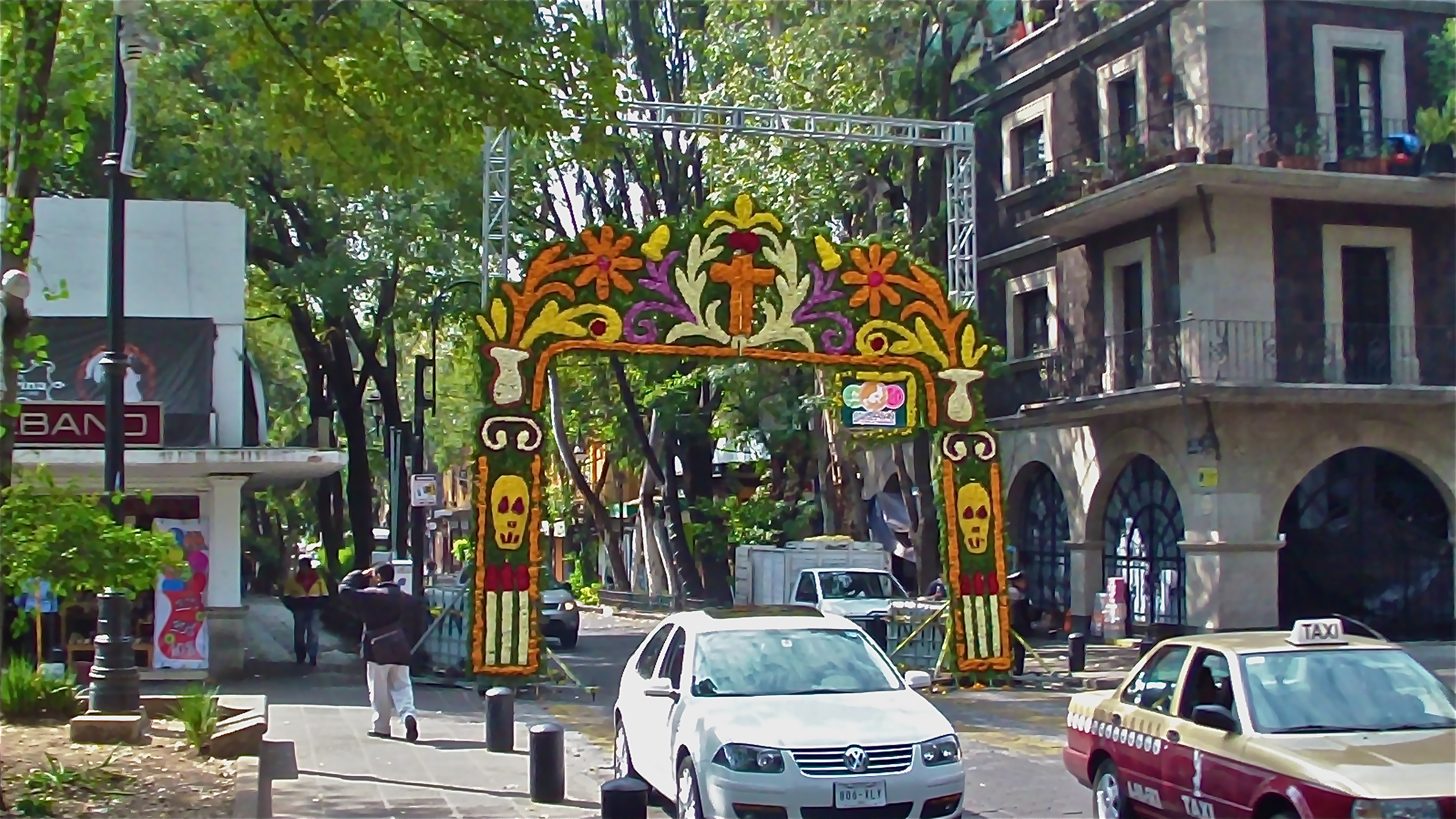
Coyoacán

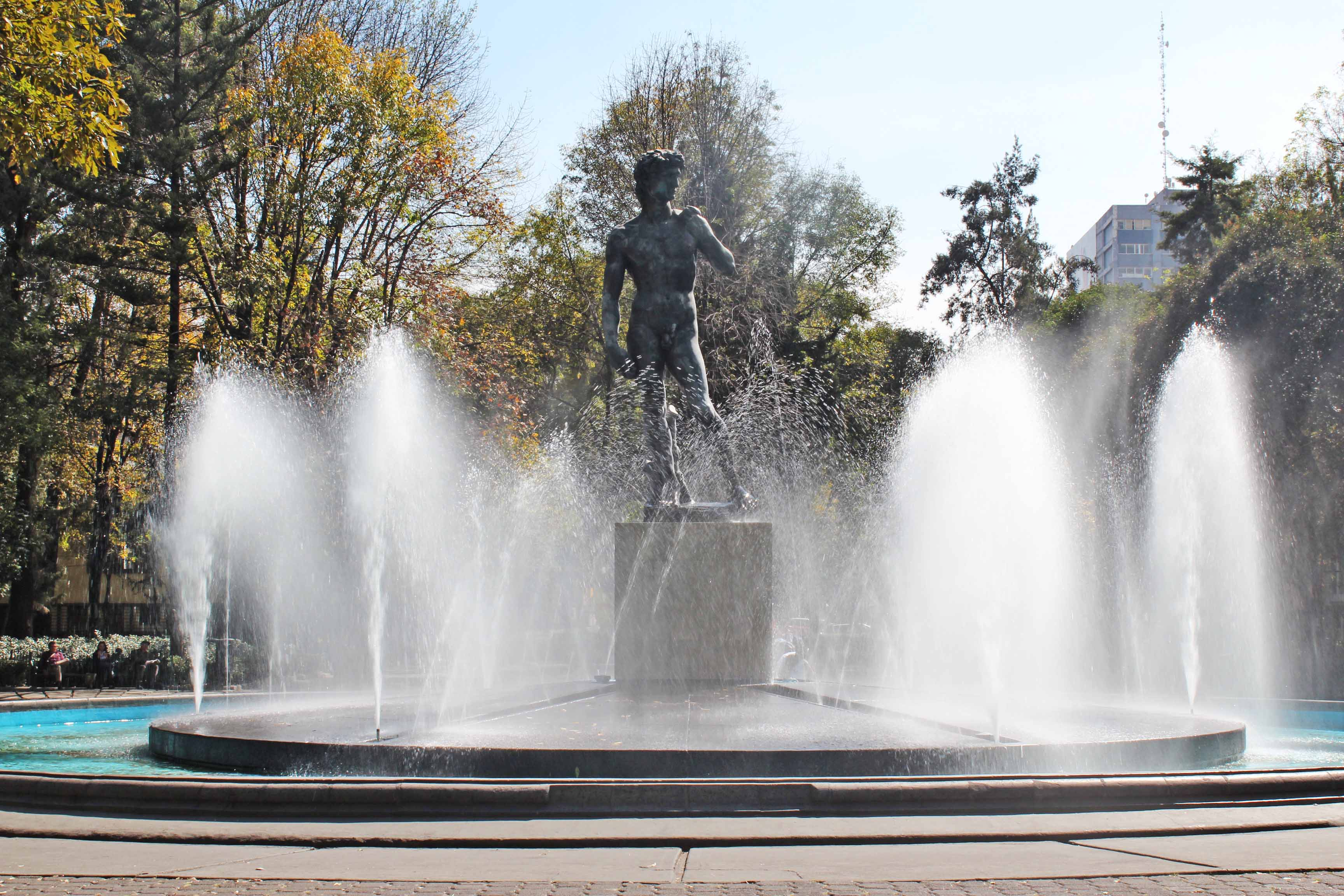
Roma

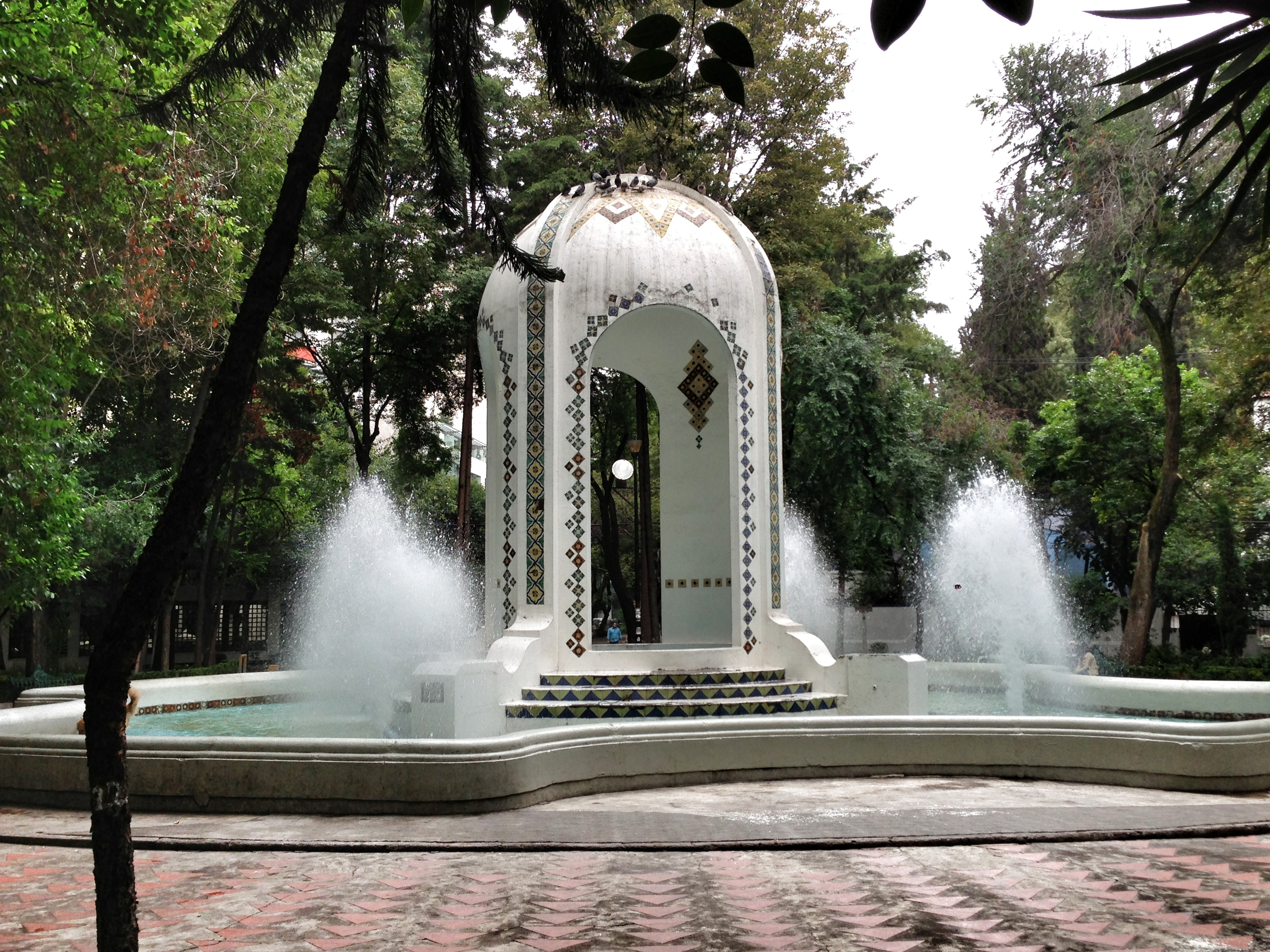
Condesa

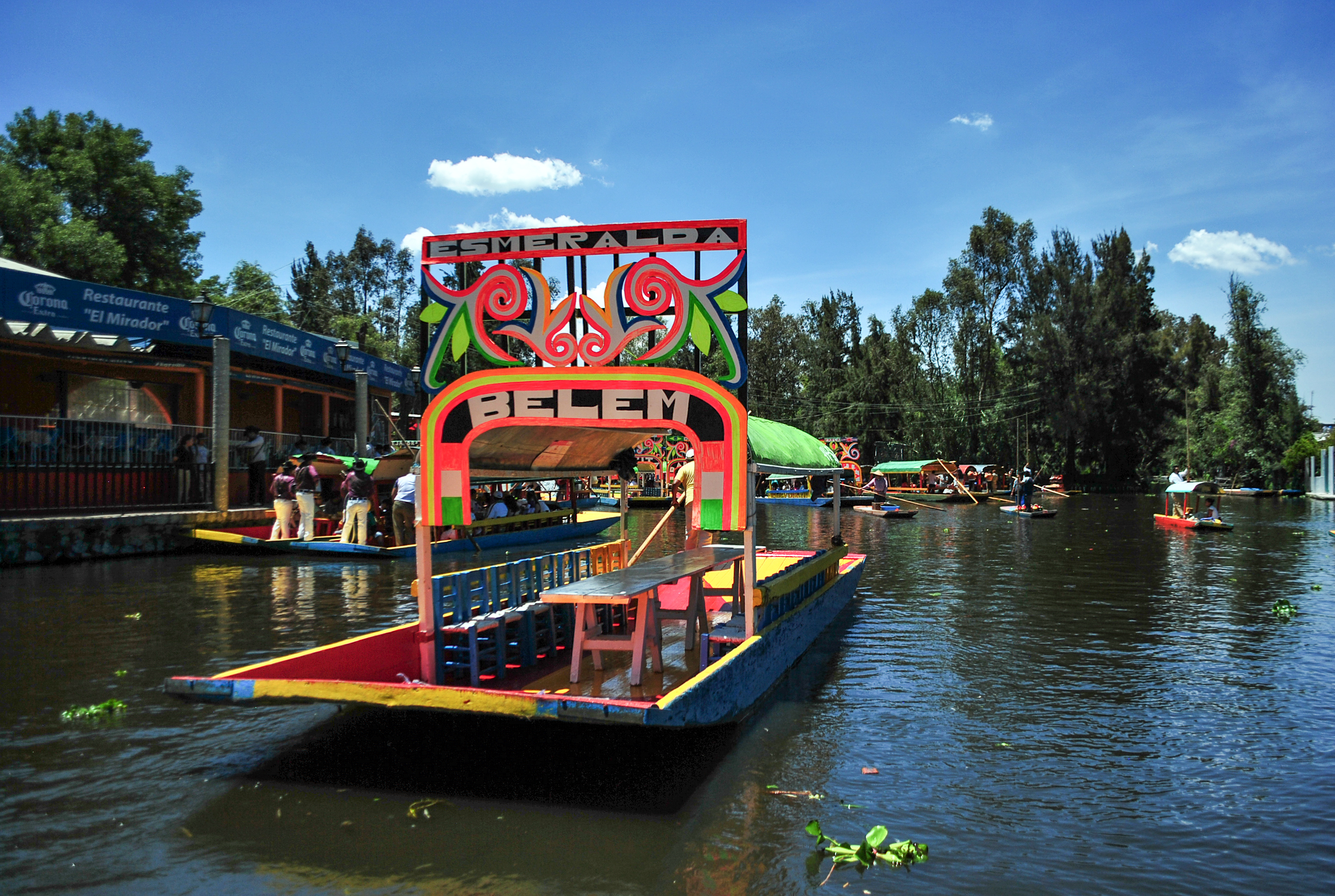
Xochimilco

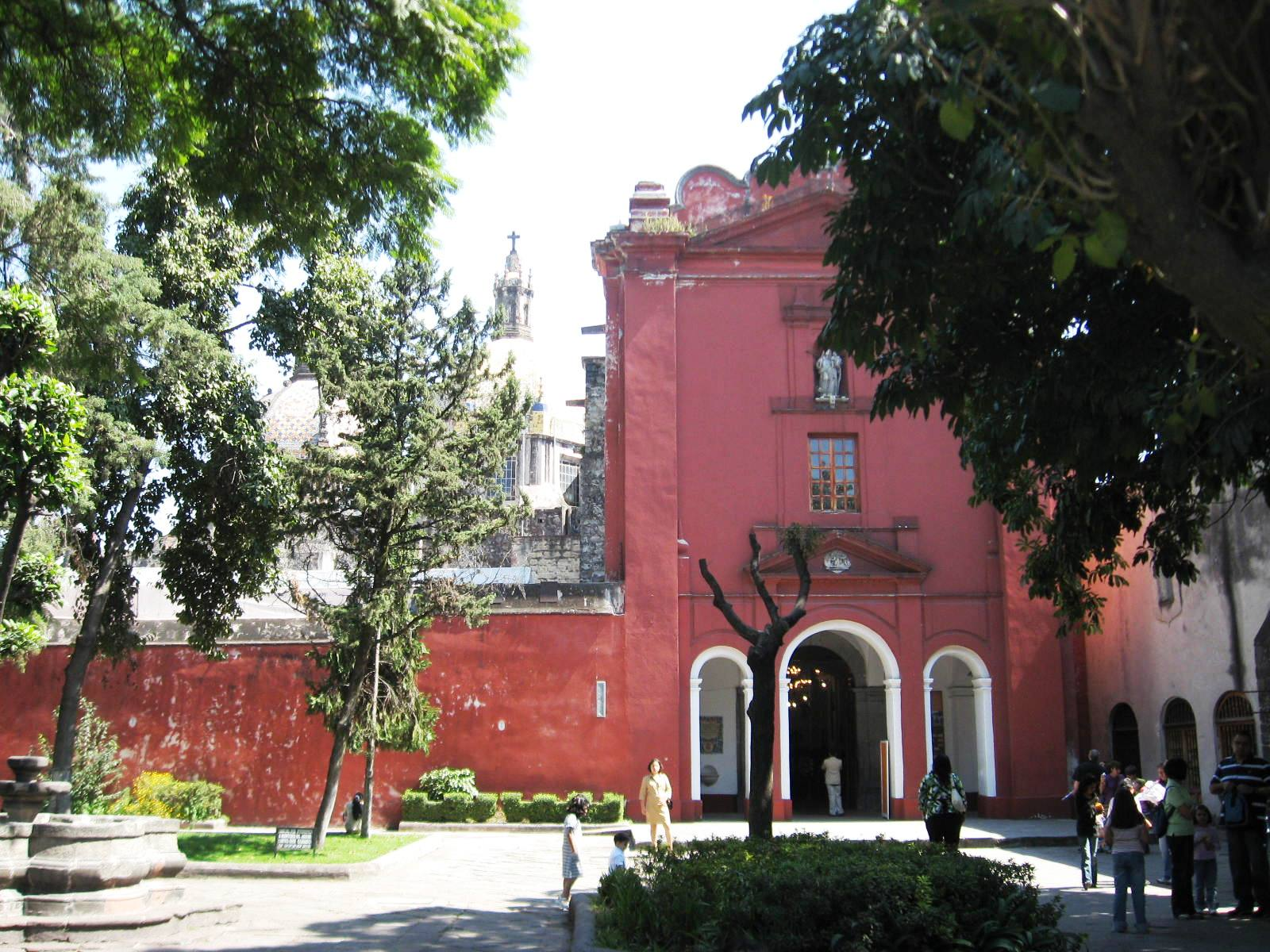
San Ángel

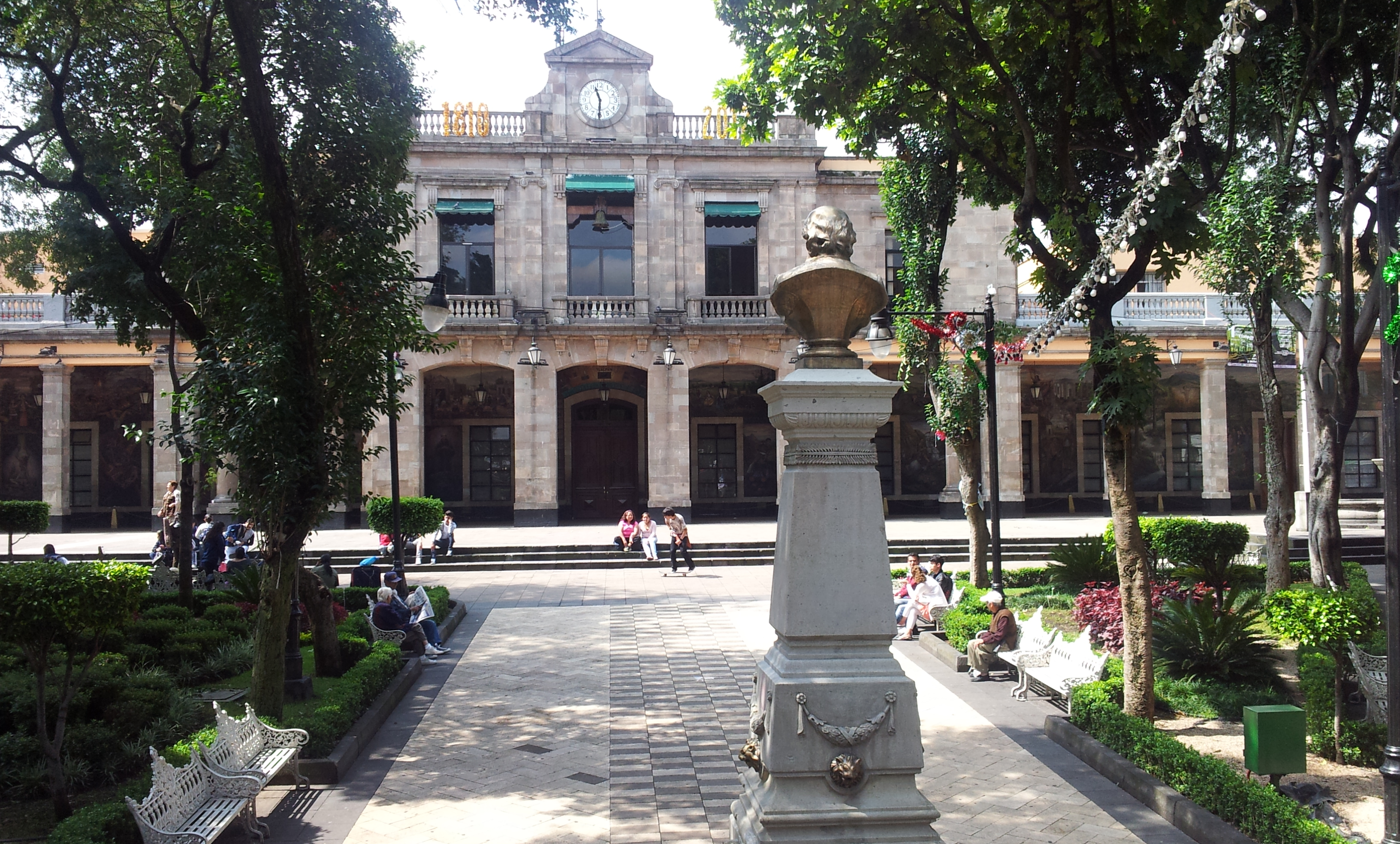
San Agustín de las Cuevas (Tlalpan)

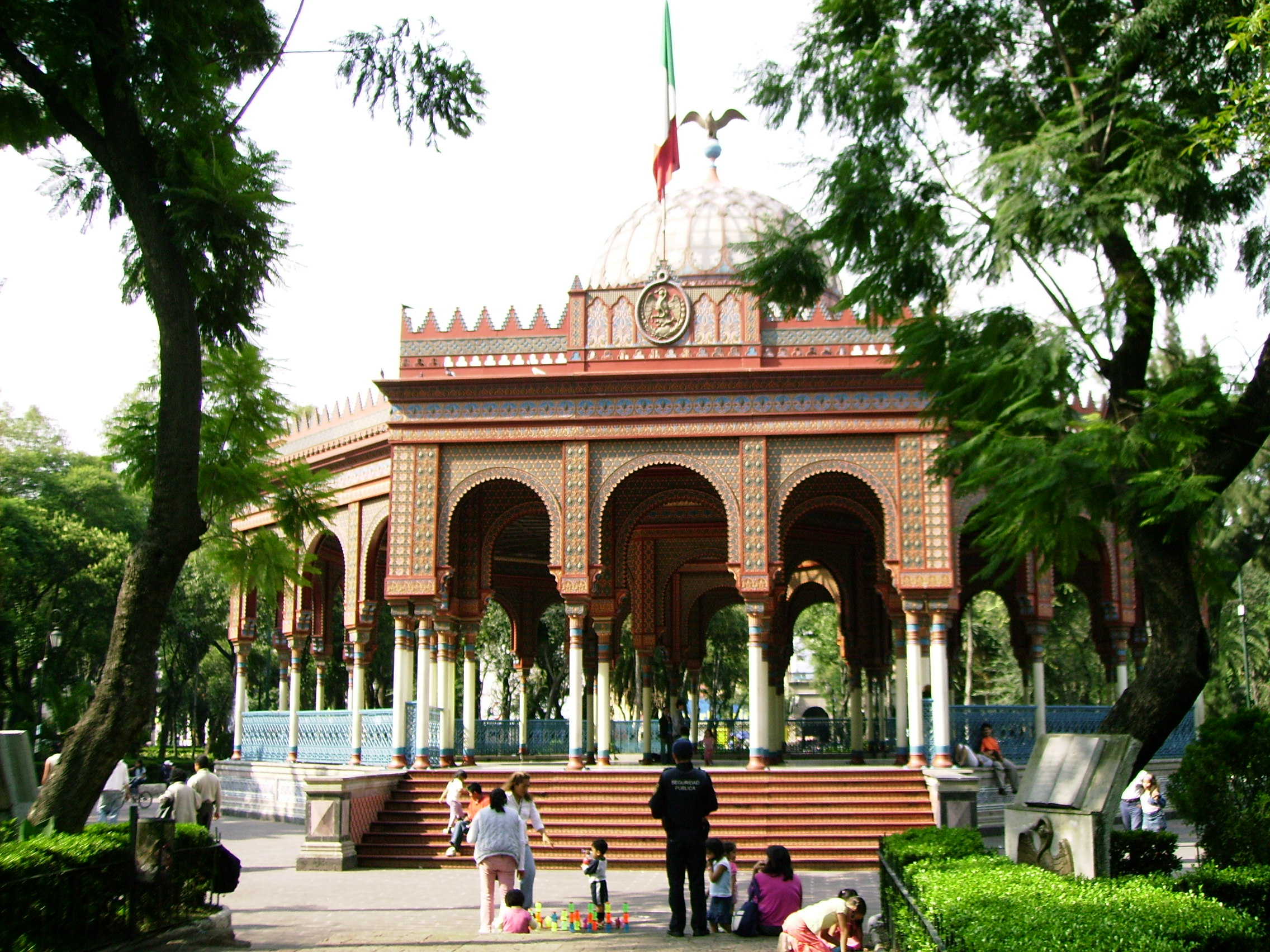
Santa María la Ribera

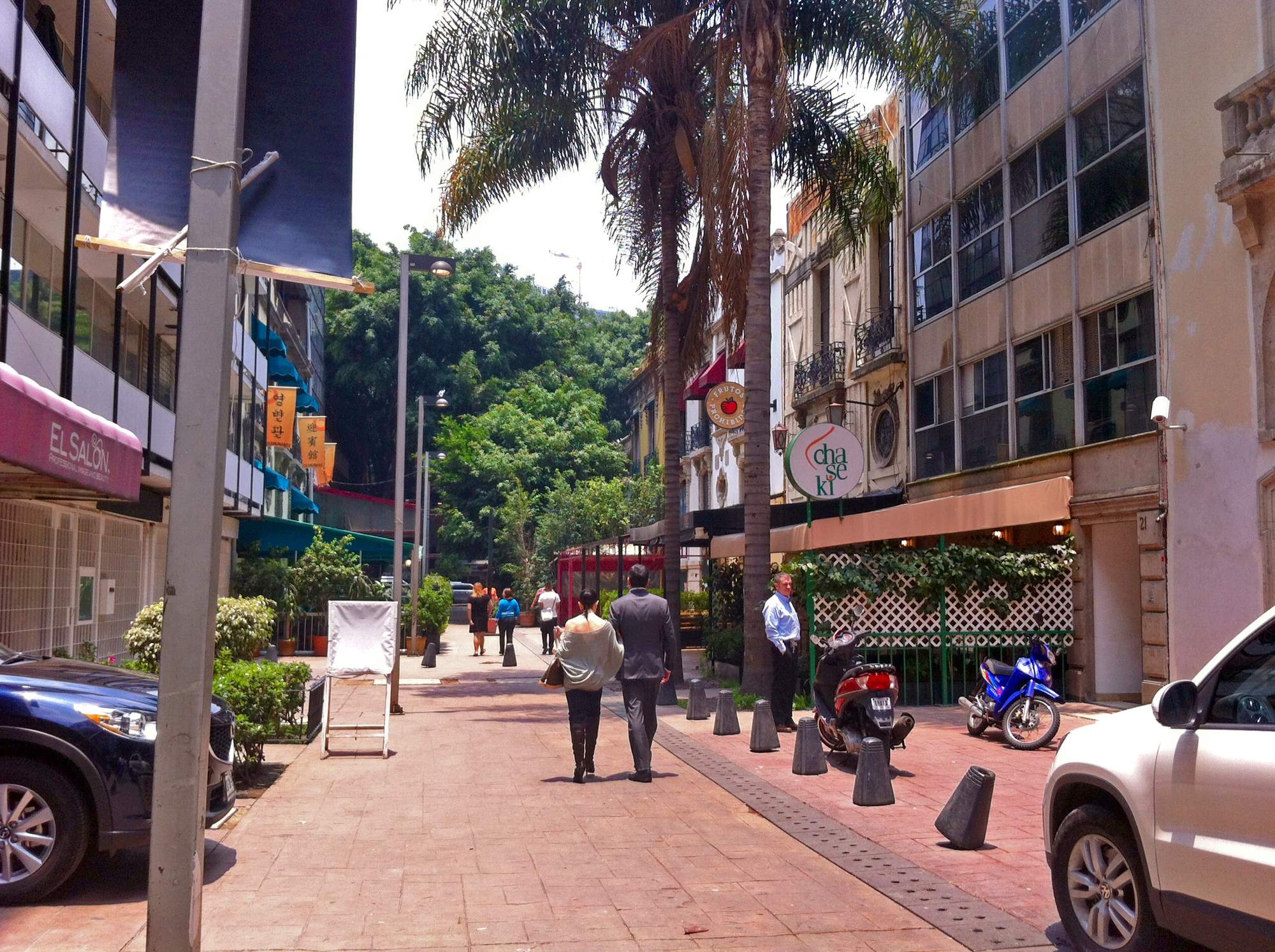
Zona Rosa

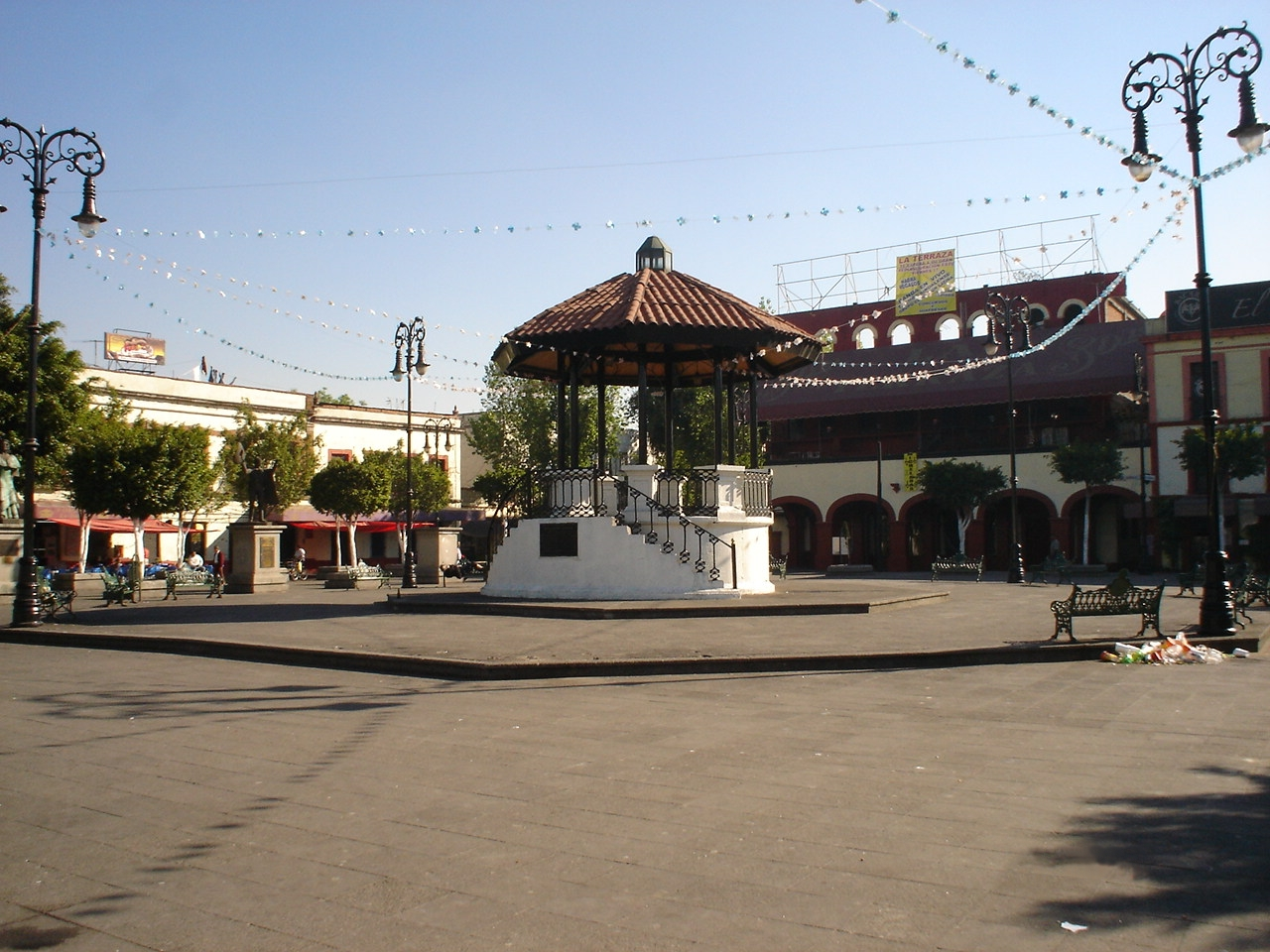
Garibaldi

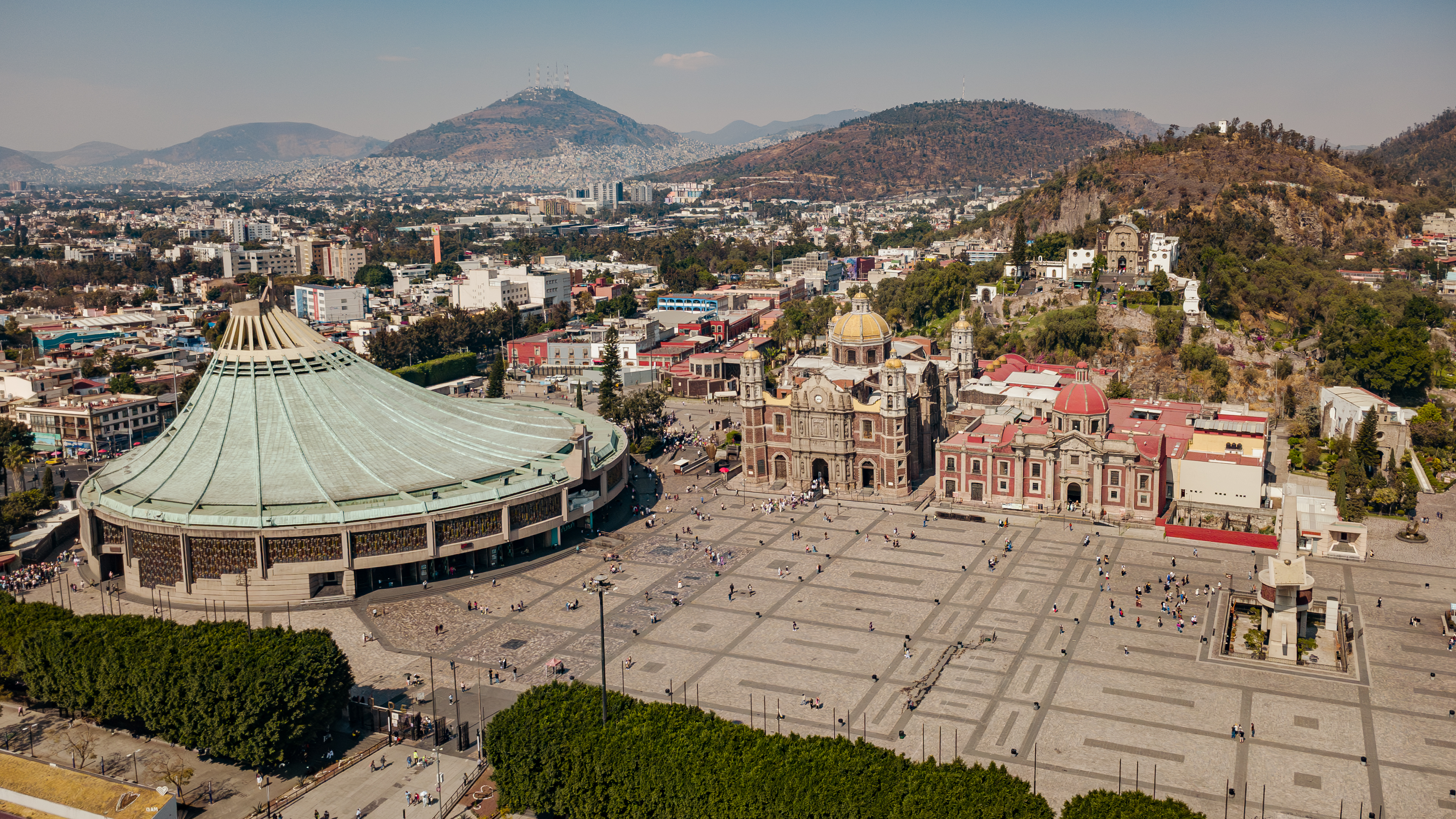
Villa de Guadalupe

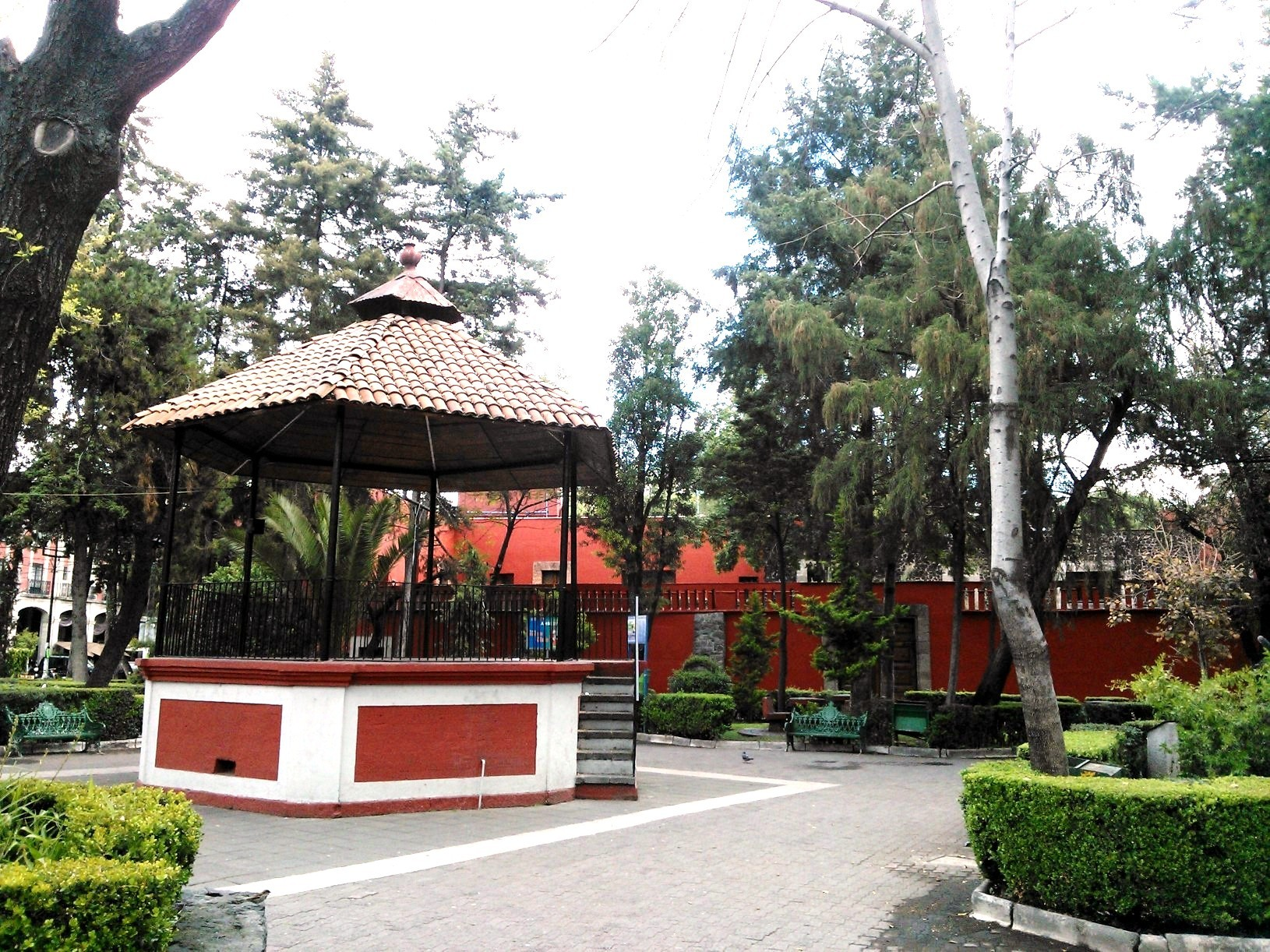
Mixcoac

Azcapotzalco

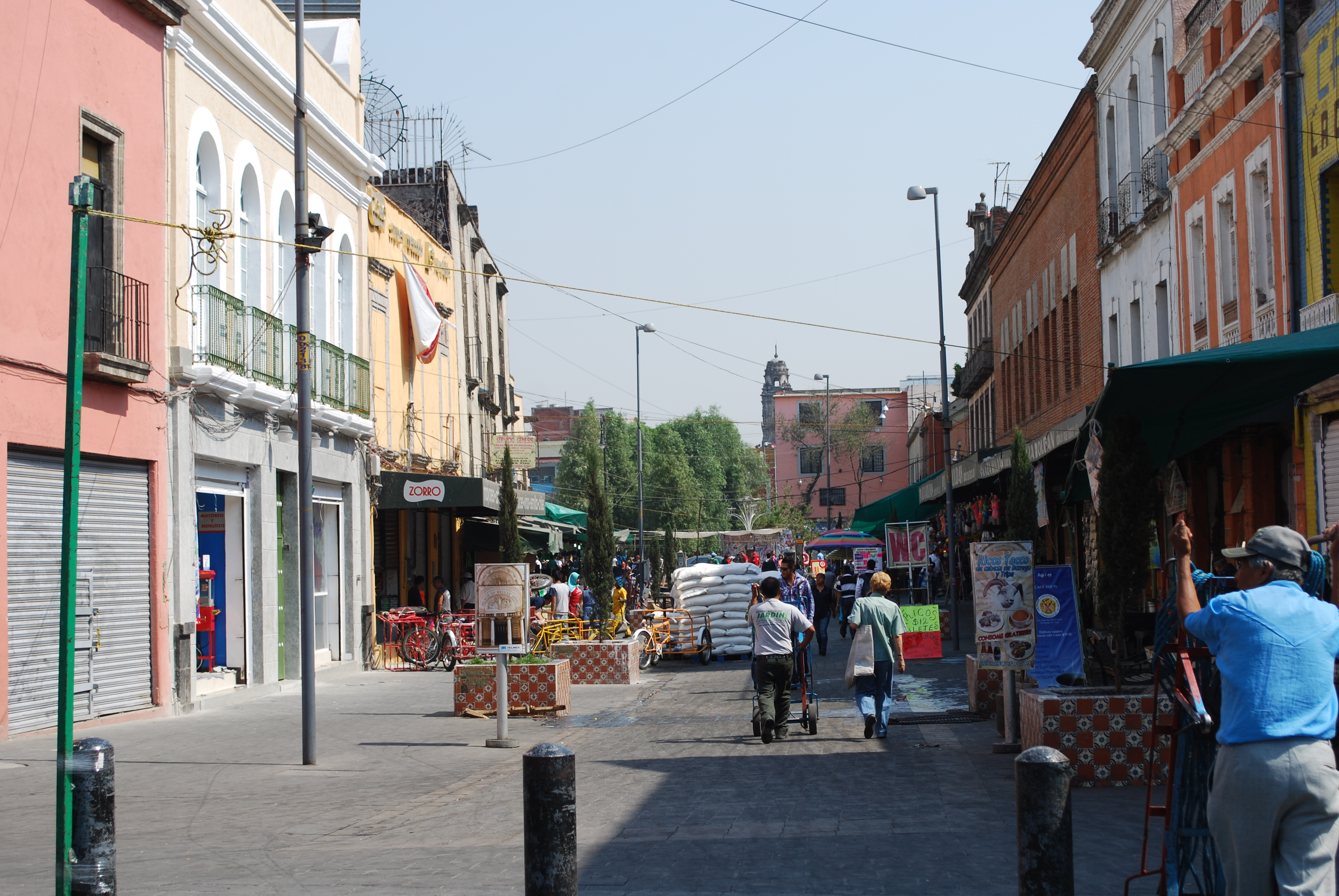
La Merced

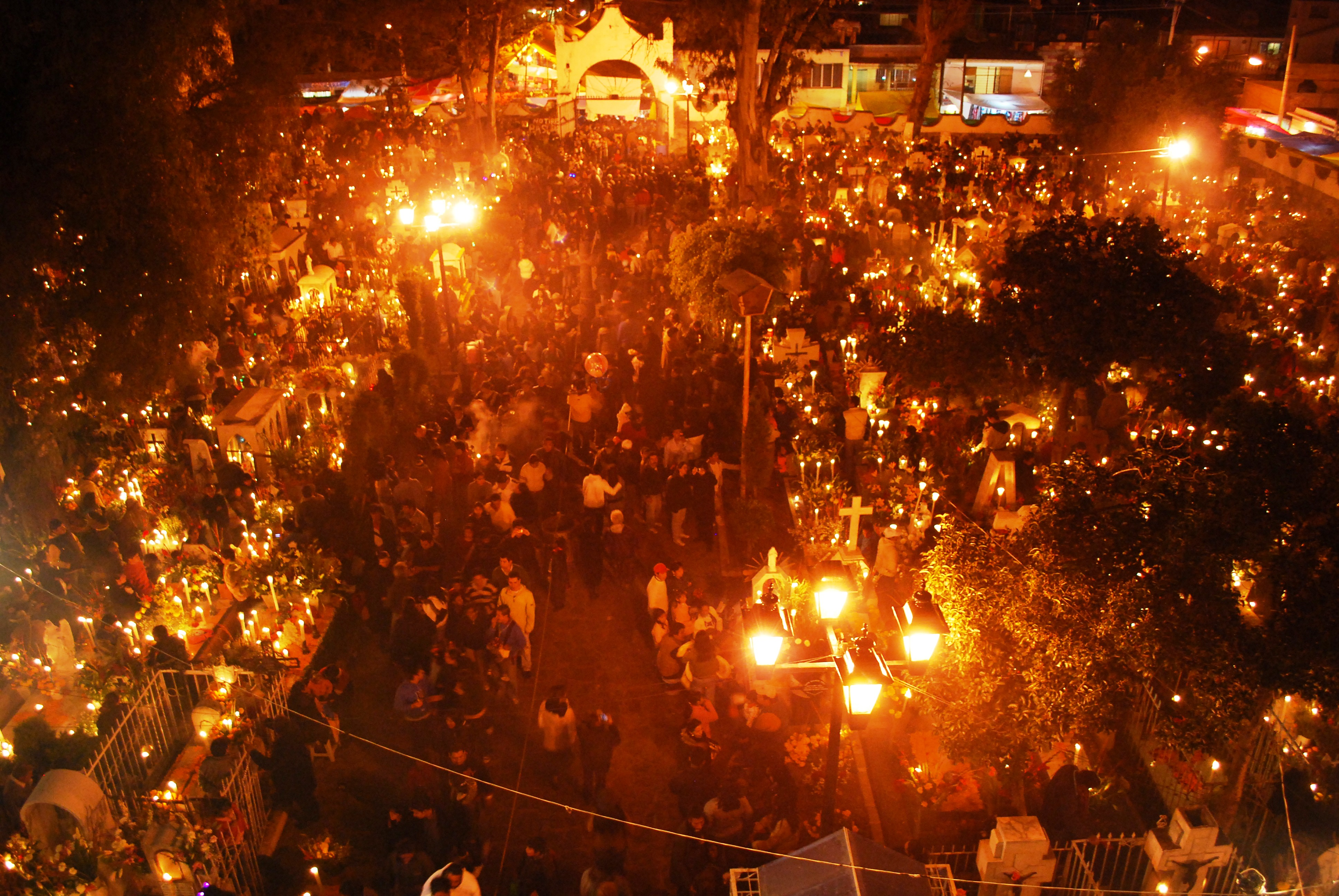
Mixquic

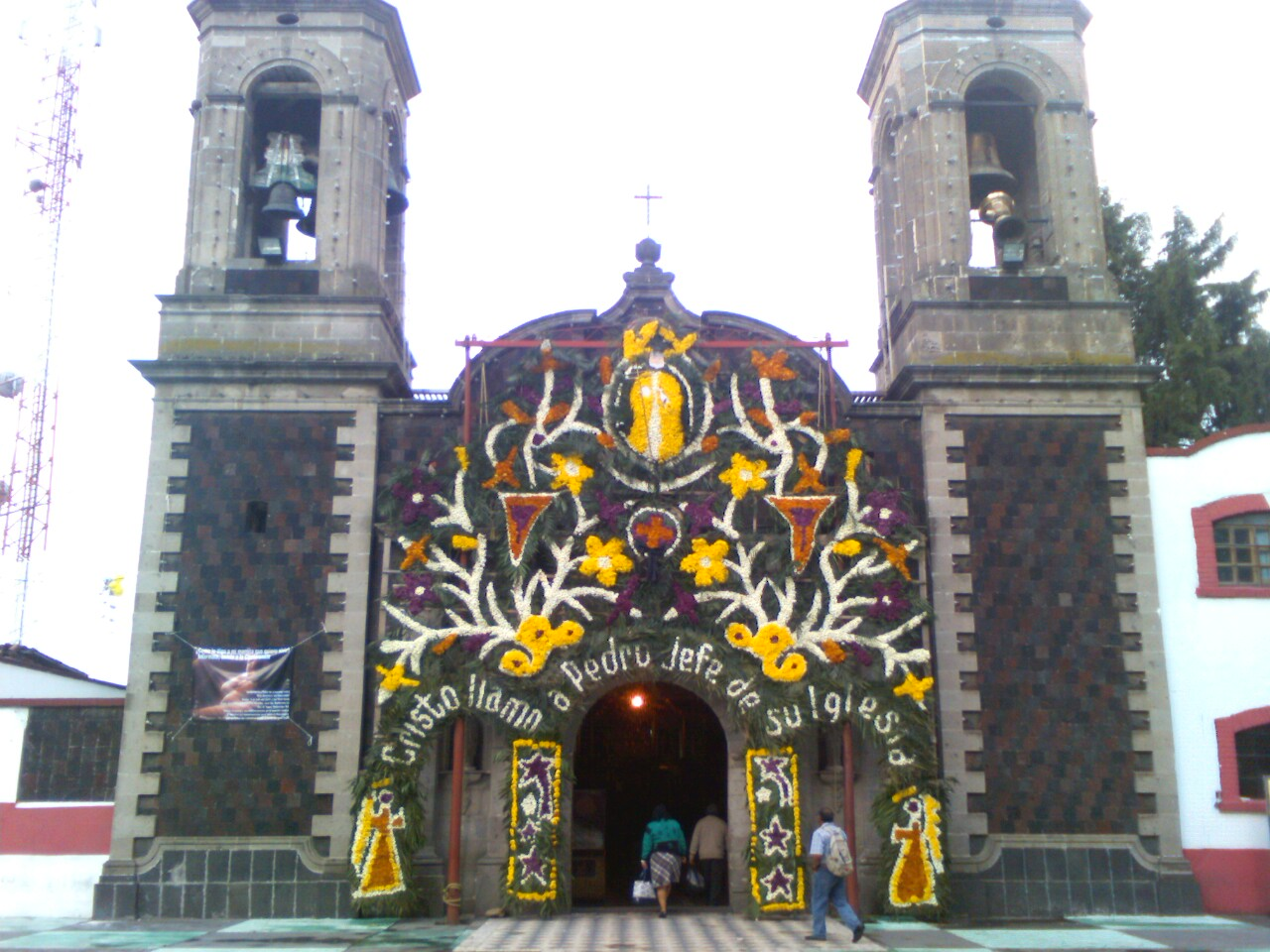
Cuajimalpa

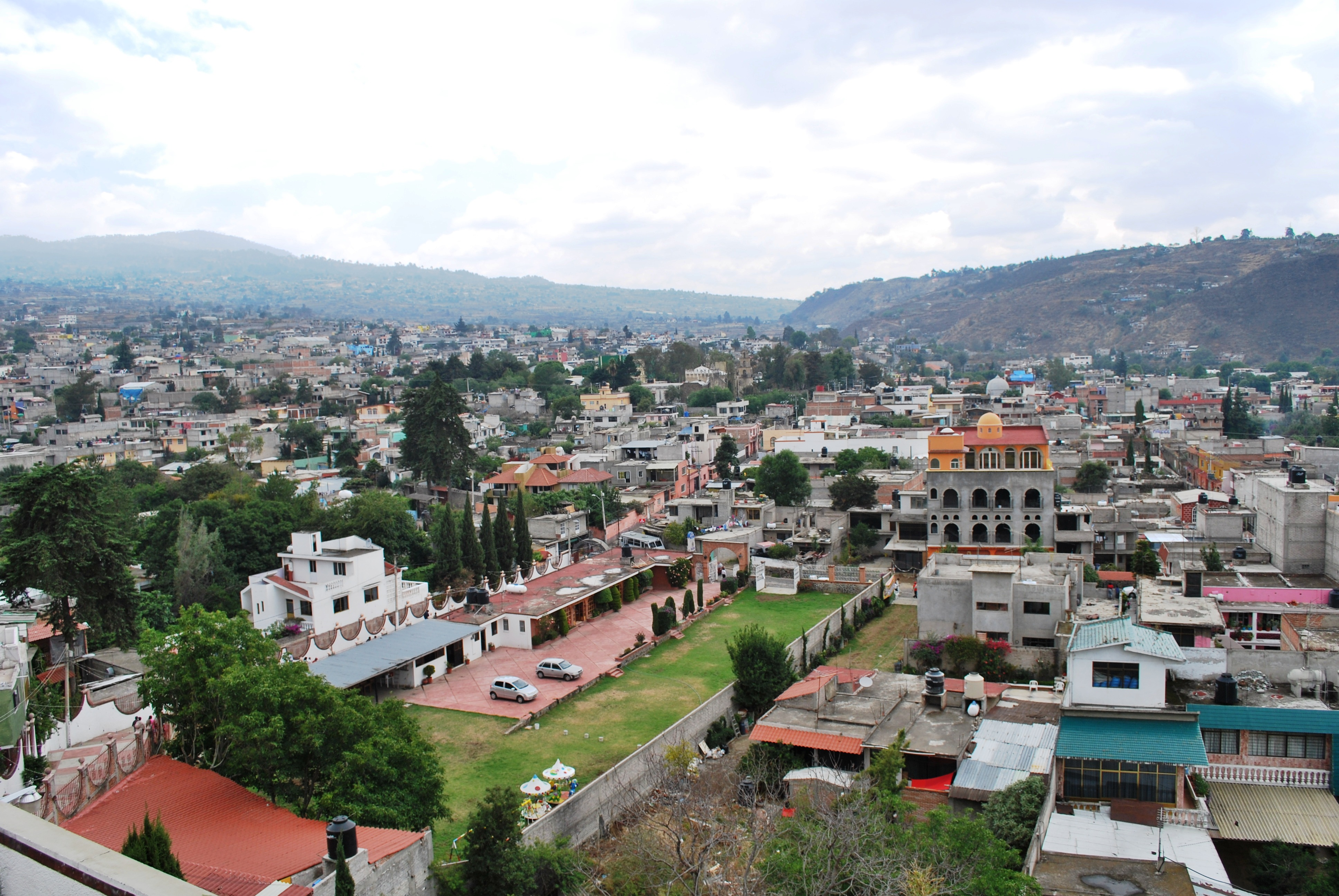
San Pedro Atocpan

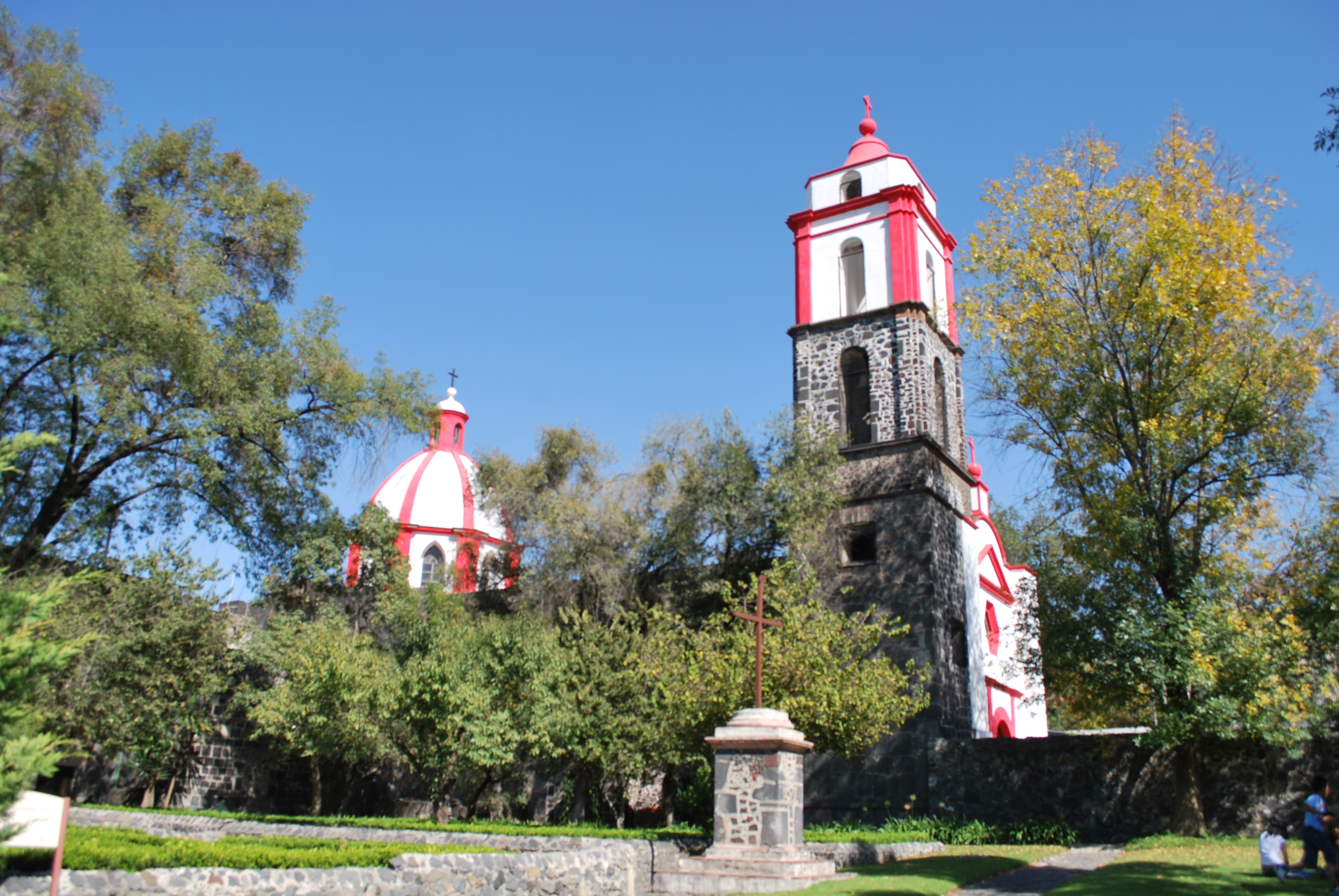
Pueblo Culhuacán

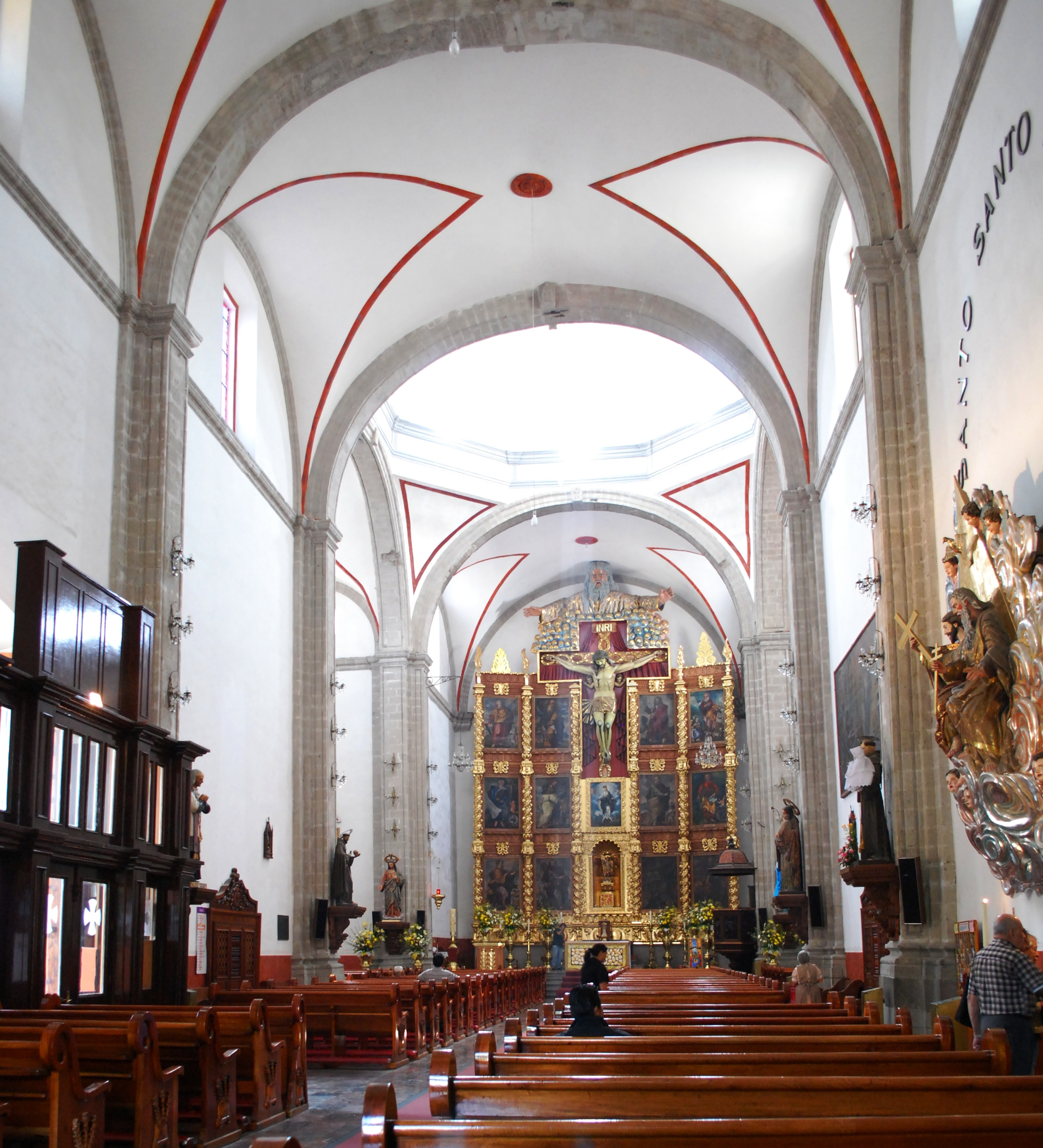
Tacuba
