= Alejandro Sánchez Camacho =

Mexican politician (born 1960)

- Born: 26 August 1960 (age 65); Federal District, Mexico
- Occupation: General Secretary of the Party of the Democratic Revolution
- Political party: PRD

Alejandro Sánchez Camacho (born 26 August 1960) is a Mexican politician affiliated with the PRD. He served as Deputy of both the LX and LXII Legislatures of the Mexican Congress representing the Federal District's 21st congressional district.

On 16 August 2012 he was appointed general secretary of the PRD.
