= San Pedro Atocpan =

- Community
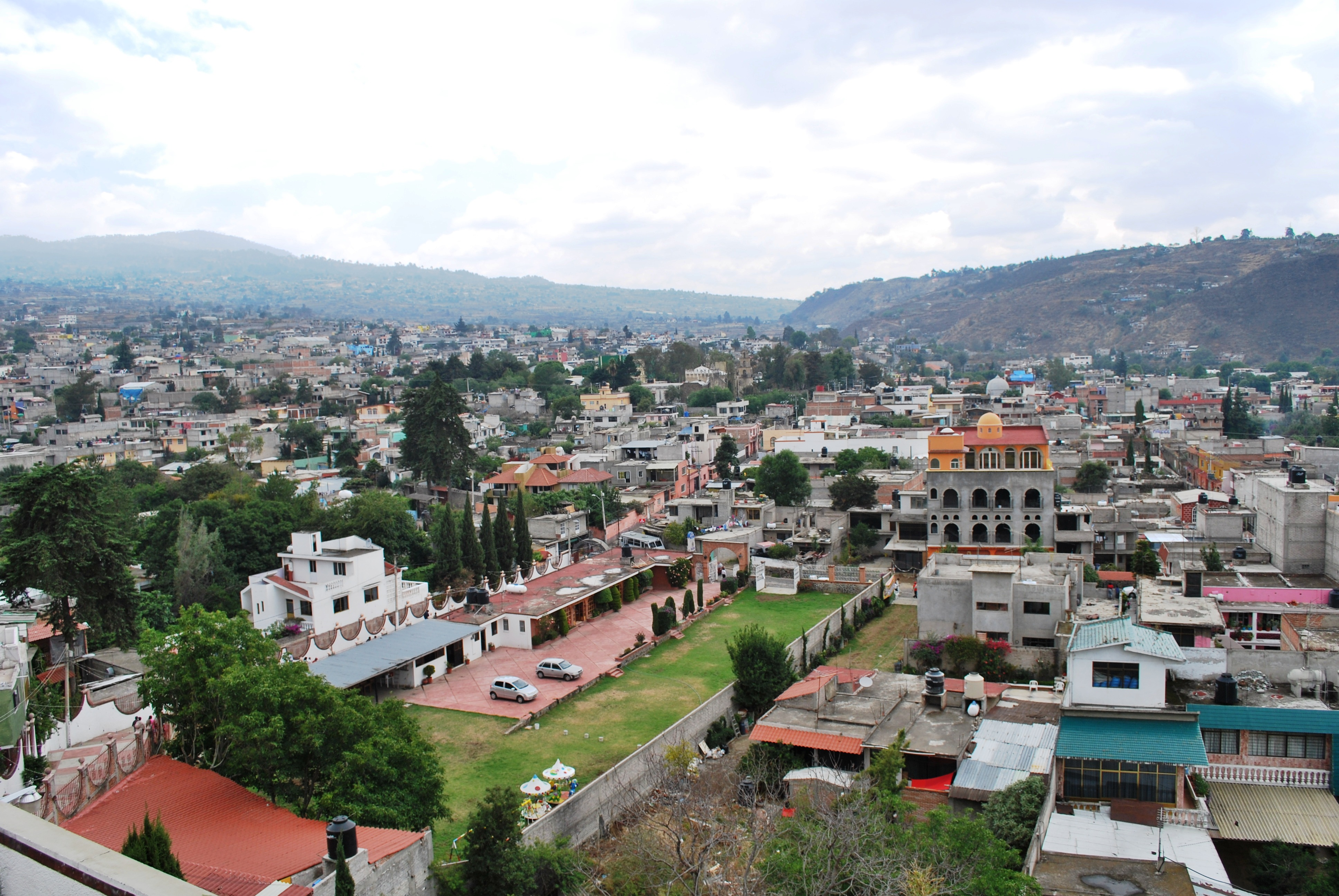

- Location within Mexico City
- Coordinates: 19°12′02″N 99°02′57″W
- Country: Mexico
- Elevation (of seat): 2,440 m (8,010 ft)

Population (2005)
  - Total: 8,997
- Time zone: UTC-6 (CST)
- Postal code (of seat): 12200
- Area code: 55

San Pedro Atocpan is one of the communities that make up the borough of Milpa Alta in Mexico City. This location is known for the preparation of mole sauce, which employs over 90% of the community and provides almost all of the sauce that is eaten in Mexico City. Despite being in the Federal District and the second largest district in size, Milpa Alta is distinctly rural. Only 116,000 of Mexico City's 8 million inhabitants live in the entire borough, and as of 2005, only 8,997 lived in San Pedro Atocpan. The name "Atocpan" is from Nahuatl and means "on fertile soil" The community is located in the northwest of the borough, on the highway between Mexico City and Oaxtepec, Morelos. It has a territory of 87.65 hectares, and is about 2,500 meters above sea level. The land here is rugged as it is wedged between the Cuauhtzin Volcano and Teutli Mountain.

This community was designated as a "Barrio Mágico" by the city in 2011.

== Mole preparation ==
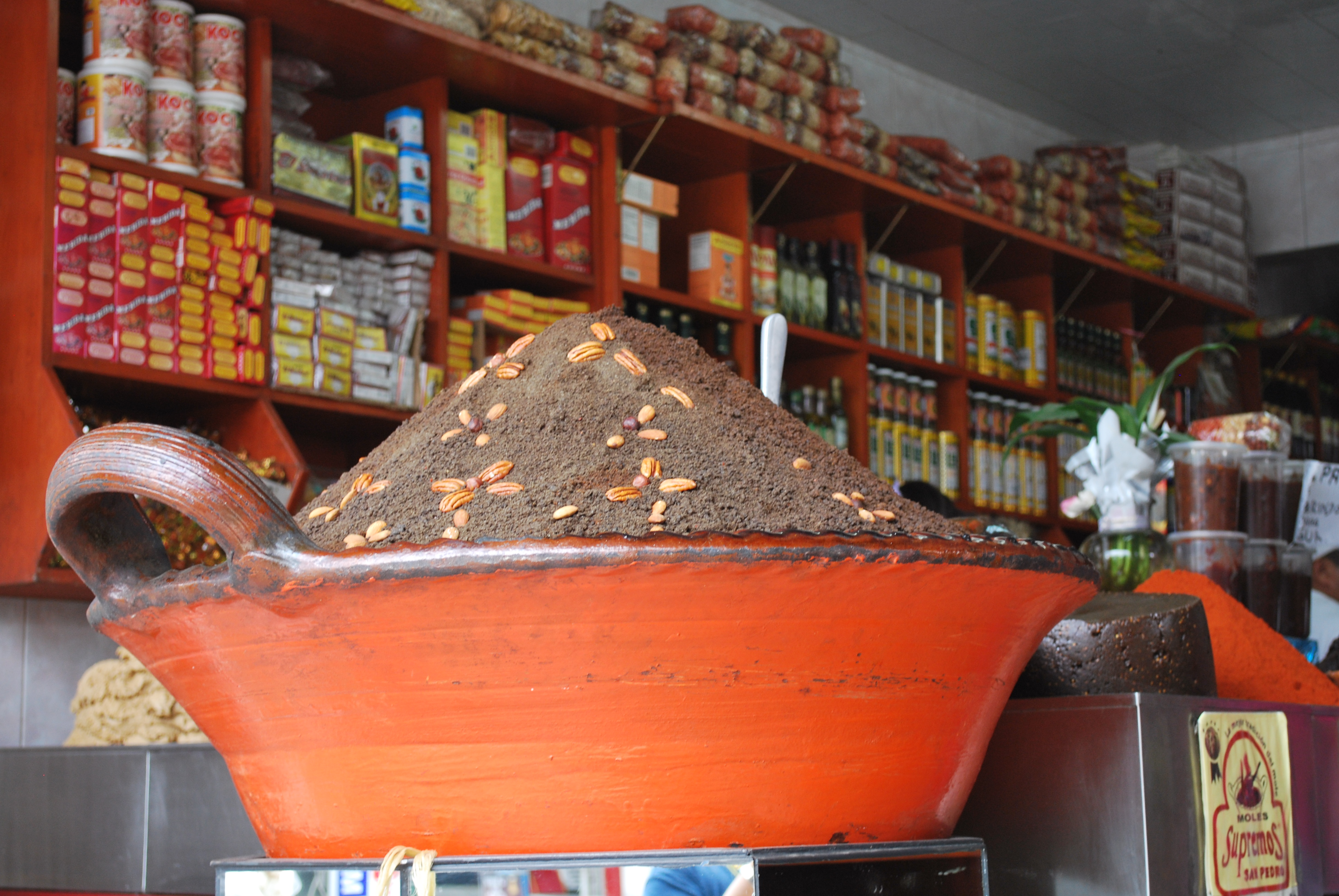
Mole mix for sale

The community is best known for the preparation of mole, a traditional sauce that comes in a variety of flavors. Modern mole is derived from a pre-Hispanic preparation called "chilmulli," which in Nahuatl means "chili pepper sauce" During the colonial period, this sauce was modified mostly by adding ingredients such as nuts, peanuts, sesame seeds and spices such as cinnamon. While the flavors have multiplied and changed, the consistency of the sauce has remained the same. Almost 92% of the community's population makes a living related to the preparation and sale of the sauce. The moles of San Pedro Atocpan are not made in factories but rather in small family-owned enterprises. Moles of different flavors, aromas, colors and textures are made, but the specialty is "mole almendrado" (almond mole), which was invented here and made with between 26 and 28 ingredients, always with a base of three chili peppers: mulato, pasilla and ancho. The recipe is well-guarded. Many of these small businesses have networked to find ways to buy the more than twenty ingredients most moles need, such as chili peppers from Zacatecas, eliminating the need for middlemen. Each family in the town has its own recipes for the various types of moles. The family of Guadalupe Rios, for example, adds apple to her moles, presumably to avoid digestive problems.

Seventy years ago, life in San Pedro Atocpan was similar to just about any other rural community growing corn and beans. At that time only four neighborhoods prepared mole for town festivals: Panchimalco, Ocotitla, Nuztla and Tula, but those who prepared it were generally prominent women in their communities. In the 1940s, one family had the idea of making the long trek to Mexico City proper to sell some of their mole at the La Merced Market. It was successful, but they brought with them only two kilos, since it was made by hand grinding the ingredients. With the paving of the main road (now the Mexico City-Oaxtepec highway) and the introduction of electricity in 1947, it became easier to make and transport mole to the city. Since then, a sauce that was traditionally made for family use became a commodity for the town. The town now produces 60% of the mole made in Mexico and 89% of the mole consumed in Mexico City, adding up to between 28,000 and 30,000 tons of mole produced each year.

== Community attractions ==
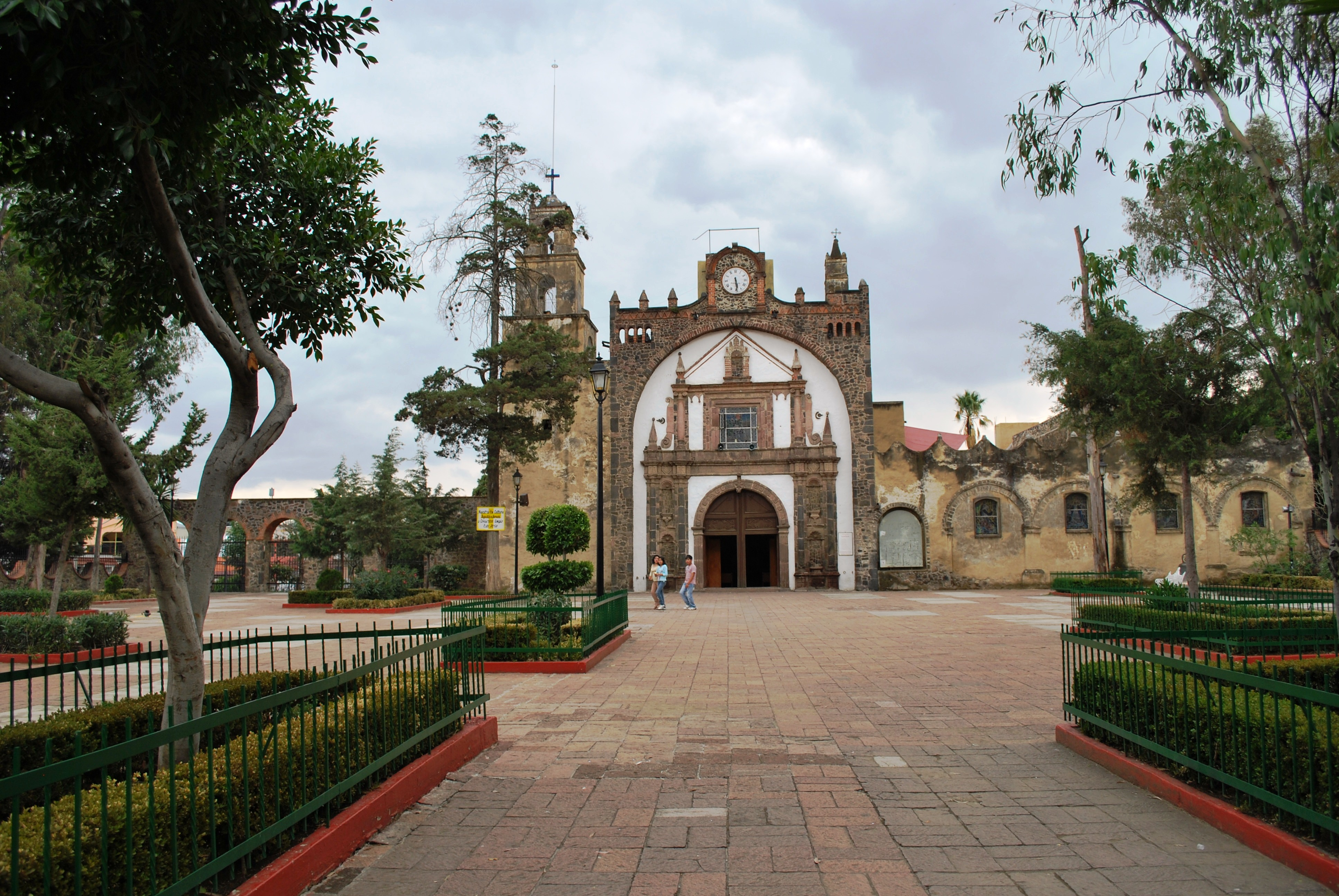
Parish of San Pedro

The community has two main churches: the Parish of San Pedro Apostol and the Church of Señor de la Misericordias. The Parish of San Pedro Apostol is a Franciscan church that was dedicated on 28 August 1680 and declared a national monument in 1933. Its patron of Saint Peter is celebrated on 29 of June of each year. The other church, Señor de las Misericordias (Lord of Mercies) is a modern building, dedicated to an image of Christ that is venerated in all of Milpa Alta. This church hosts a festival to this image each May that brings people from other parts of the delegation as well as the neighboring states of Morelos and Mexico State.

=== National Festival of Mole ===
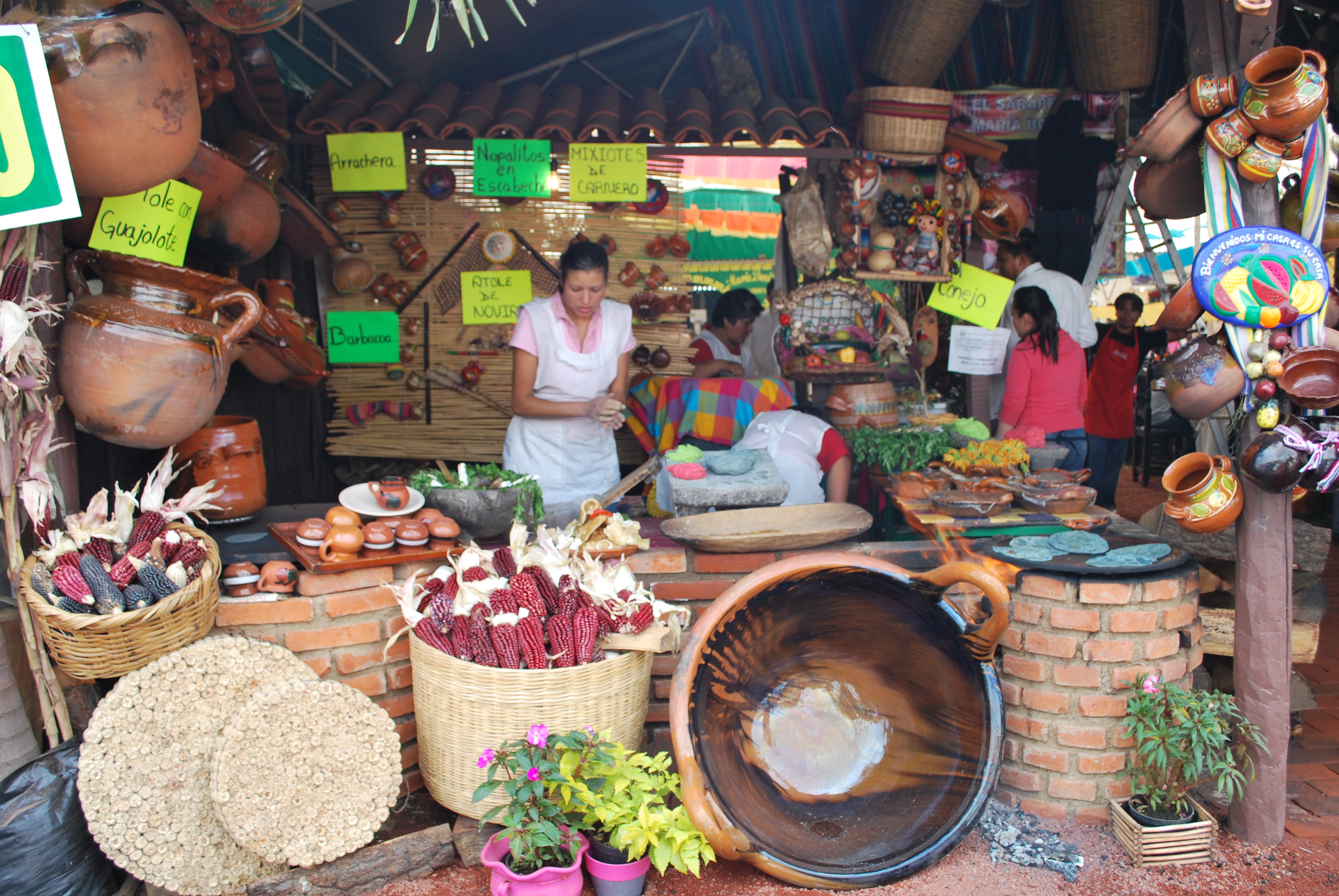
Woman cooking tortillas at one of the food stands selling mole at the fair

The National Festival of Mole is hosted at the location each year in October. It began in 1977 with the specific aim of promoting the town's product. The first festival was not held in the San Pedro Atocpan proper, but in the neighborhood of Yenhuitlalpan with only four restaurants participating. It was held not in October but rather in May to coincide with the festival in honor of the Señor de las Misericordias. However, this caused problems with people who did not like the idea of taking advantage of a religious festival for commercial purposes. So the mole festival was moved to October, where it has remained since. The annual festival has crafts, food, traditional Mexican music, carnival rides and other fair attractions. Today, over 2,600 people actively participate to bring the event together and prepare about 400,000 plates of different mole dishes such as pork chops and rabbit in adobo, chicken and turkey in mole almendrado (almond mole) and mole verde (green mole) but the favorites are enchiladas made with various traditional moles.
