= Miguel Ángel Toscano =

Mexican politician

- Born: 17 November 1973 (age 52); Mexico City, Mexico
- Occupation: Politician
- Political party: PAN

Miguel Ángel Toscano Velasco (born 17 November 1973) is a Mexican politician affiliated with the National Action Party (PAN). In 2003–2006 he served as a deputy in the 59th Congress, representing the Federal District's 21st congressional district.
