= 2022–23 Serie B de México season =

Serie B de México
- Season: 2022–23
- Champions: Apertura: Calor (1st title); Clausura: Alebrijes de Oaxaca (1st title)
- Promoted: Chilpancingo
- Matches: 110
- Goals: 313 (2.85 per match)
- Top goalscorer: Apertura: Antonio López; Daniel Rodríguez (7 goals); Clausura: Saúl Ramírez (11 goals)
- Biggest home win: Apertura: Cañoneros 3–0 Ciervos (10 September 2022); Ciervos 6–3 Atlético Angelópolis (28 September 2022); Clausura: Alebrijes de Oaxaca 10–0 Cañoneros (14 January 2023)
- Biggest away win: Apertura: Ciervos 1–6 Pioneros de Cancún (8 October 2022); Clausura: Atlético Angelópolis 0–6 Ciervos (17 February 2023)
- Highest scoring: Apertura: Ciervos 6–3 Atlético Angelópolis (28 September 2022); Clausura: Alebrijes de Oaxaca 10–0 Cañoneros (14 January 2023)
- Longest winning run: Apertura: 4 matches Mazorqueros; Clausura: 5 matches Calor
- Longest unbeaten run: Apertura: 10 matches Calor; Clausura: 7 matches T'hó Mayas
- Longest winless run: Apertura: 10 matches Atlético Angelópolis; Clausura: 7 matches Cañoneros
- Longest losing run: Apertura: 8 matches Atlético Angelópolis; Clausura: 4 matches Cañoneros
- Highest attendance: Apertura: 2,000; Mazorqueros 2–1 Huracanes Izcalli (27 August 2022); Clausura: 700; Chilpancingo 0–1 Pioneros de Cancún (14 January 2023); Chilpancingo 2–0 Cañoneros (18 February 2023)
- Lowest attendance: Apertura: 40; Atlético Angelópolis 2–3 Calor (1 October 2022); Clausura: 40; Huracanes Izcalli 1–1 Zitácuaro (21 January 2023)
- Total attendance: Apertura: 13,122; Clausura: 9,680
- Average attendance: Apertura: 252; Clausura: 179
- Stats are from the regular season only

The 2022–23 Serie B de México season was part of the third-tier football league of Mexico. The tournament began on 26 August 2022 and finished on 7 May 2023.

== Offseason changes ==
- On May 21, 2022 Aguacateros CDU was promoted to Serie A de México.
- On June 1, 2022 Chilpancingo was promoted from Liga TDP.
- On July 1, 2022 Cañoneros and Mazorqueros were relocated from Serie A de México.
- On July 1, 2022 Pioneros de Cancún and Zitácuaro joined the league after one–year hiatus.
- On July 1, 2022 Atlético Angelópolis and T'hó Mayas joined the league as expansion teams.
- On August 10, 2022 Lobos Huerta F.C. declined their Liga Premier participation for 2022–23 season to participate in the Liga de Balompié Mexicano.
- C.D. Cuautla and Guerreros de Xico were put on hiatus.

== Teams information ==
=== Teams ===
Location of teams in the 2022–23 Serie B

Club	Manager	City	Stadium	Capacity	Affiliate
Alebrijes de Oaxaca	(Mexico) Humberto Martínez	Oaxaca City, Oaxaca	Tecnológico de Oaxaca	14,598	Alebrijes de Oaxaca
Atlético Angelópolis	(Mexico) Romeo Quiroz	Puebla City, Puebla	Unidad Deportiva Mario Vázquez Raña	800	–
Calor	(Mexico) Víctor Manuel Morales	Monclova, Coahuila	Ciudad Deportiva Nora Leticia Rocha	5,000	–
Cañoneros	(Mexico) Edgar Jiménez	Milpa Alta, Mexico City	Momoxco	3,500	–
Chilpancingo	(Mexico) Arturo Juárez	Chilpancingo, Guerrero	Polideportivo Chilpancingo	5,000	–
Ciervos	(Mexico) Jesús Téllez	Chalco de Díaz Covarrubias, State of Mexico	Arreola	3,217	–
Huracanes Izcalli	(Mexico) Antonio Gutiérrez	Cuautitlán Izcalli, State of Mexico	Hugo Sánchez Márquez (Note: Although the club registered the Estadio Hugo Sánchez Márquez as its official field, the team played some matches at the Estadio Arreola.)	3,500	–
Mazorqueros	(Mexico) Benny Ferreyra	Ciudad Guzmán, Jalisco	Municipal Santa Rosa (Note: Although the club started the season at the Estadio Municipal Santa Rosa, on 21 September 2022 the team moved to the Centro Deportivo Zapotlán because their stadium was damaged after the 2022 Michoacán earthquake. The team returned to its stadium until the play-offs of the Torneo Apertura.)	4,000	La Paz
Pioneros de Cancún	(Mexico) Enrique Vela	Cancún, Quintana Roo	Andrés Quintana Roo	17,289	Cancún
T'hó Mayas	(Mexico) David Patiño	Homún, Yucatán	Hipólito Tzab	600	–
Zitácuaro	(Mexico) Mario Alberto Trejo	Zitácuaro, Michoacán	Ignacio López Rayón	10,000	–

== Torneo Apertura ==
=== Standings ===
Pos	Team	Pld	W	D	L	GF	GA	GD	BP	Pts	Qualification or relegation
1	Mazorqueros	10	7	1	2	16	7	+9	1	23	Qualification to semi-finals and Copa Conecta
2	Alebrijes de Oaxaca	10	6	2	2	19	11	+8	3	23	Qualification to Reclassification and Copa Conecta
3	Pioneros de Cancún	10	5	2	3	15	10	+5	1	18	Qualification to Reclassification and Copa Conecta
4	Calor (C)	10	4	6	0	13	8	+5	0	18	Qualification to Reclassification and Copa Conecta
5	Chilpancingo	10	4	5	1	13	10	+3	1	18	Qualification to Reclassification and Copa Conecta
6	Zitácuaro	10	5	1	4	11	10	+1	0	16	Qualification to Reclassification and Copa Conecta
7	T'hó Mayas	10	4	2	4	15	12	+3	1	15	Qualification to Reclassification and Copa Conecta
8	Cañoneros	10	3	2	5	16	16	0	2	13	
9	Huracanes Izcalli	10	3	2	5	12	15	−3	0	11	
10	Ciervos	10	2	0	8	12	27	−15	0	6	
11	Atlético Angelópolis	10	0	1	9	9	25	−16	0	1	

Updated to match(es) played on 22 October 2022. Source: Liga Premier FMF
(C) Champions

=== Positions by round ===
Qualification to semi-finals
Qualification to reclassification
Last place in table

Team ╲ Round	1	2	3	4	5	6	7	8	9	10	11
Mazorqueros	2	5	1	1	2	3	4†	2	4	2	1
Alebrijes de Oaxaca	4	1	3	2	1	1	1	1	1	1†	2
Pioneros de Cancún	6	3	2	4	3	2	3	5†	2	4	3
Calor	5	7†	6	5	5	5	6	4	5	5	4
Chilpancingo	7	2	5	6†	4	4	2	3	3	3	5
Zitácuaro	3	6	7	8	7	6	7	7	7†	7	6
T'hó Mayas	1	4	4	3	6	7	5	6	6	6	7†
Cañoneros	10	11	10†	7	8	8	9	8	8	8	8
Huracanes Izcalli	9	9	8	9	9†	9	8	9	9	9	9
Ciervos	8†	8	9	10	11	11	10	10	10	10	10
Atlético Angelópolis	11	10	11	11	10	10†	11	11	11	11	11

Updated to match(es) played on 22 October 2022. Source: Liga Premier FMF
Notes: † indicates team rested that round

=== Results ===
Home \ Away	ALE	ANG	CAL	CAÑ	CHI	CIE	HUR	MAZ	PIO	THM	ZIT
Alebrijes de Oaxaca	—	2–1	1–1	—	2–2	—	—	—	3–0	—	—
Atlético Angelópolis	—	—	2–3	—	1–1	—	—	0–1	—	—	0–1
Calor	—	—	—	2–0	—	—	0–0	0–0	—	2–2	0–0
Cañoneros	1–3	3–0	—	—	0–1	3–0	—	—	2–2	3–2	—
Chilpancingo	—	—	0–0	—	—	—	2–1	0–2	—	1–1	3–2
Ciervos	2–1	6–3	2–3	—	1–3	—	—	—	1–6	0–1	—
Huracanes Izcalli	1–3	4–2	—	2–2	—	1–0	—	—	0–1	—	—
Mazorqueros	1–2	—	—	3–2	—	4–0	2–1	—	1–0	—	—
Pioneros de Cancún	—	2–0	1–2	—	0–0	—	—	—	—	—	1–0
T'hó Mayas	0–1	2–0	—	—	—	—	3–1	0–1	1–2	—	3–1
Zitácuaro	2–1	—	—	1–0	—	2–0	0–1	2–1	—	—	—

Updated to match(es) played on 22 October 2022. Source: Liga Premier FMF
Legend: Blue = home team win; Yellow = draw; Red = away team win.

=== Regular season statistics ===
==== Top goalscorers ====
Players sorted first by goals scored, then by last name.

Rank	Player	Club	Goals
1	(Mexico) Antonio López	Pioneros de Cancún	7
1	(Mexico) Daniel Rodríguez	Huracanes Izcalli	7
3	(Mexico) Carlos González	T'hó Mayas	6
3	(Mexico) Pablo Romagnoli	Cañoneros	6
5	(Mexico) Jorge Salvatierra	Ciervos	5
5	(Mexico) Thomas Seay	Zitácuaro	5
7	(Mexico) Bryan García	Alebrijes de Oaxaca	4
7	(Mexico) Kevin Loera	Alebrijes de Oaxaca	4
7	(Mexico) Osvaldo Nava	Chilpancingo	4
10	(Mexico) Eduardo Díaz	Calor	3
10	(Mexico) Óscar García	Mazorqueros	3
10	(Mexico) Joel Robinson	Calor	3

Source:Liga Premier FMF

==== Hat-tricks ====
Player	For	Against	Result	Date	Round	Reference
(Mexico) Jorge Salvatierra	Ciervos	Atlético Angelópolis	6 – 3 (H)	28 September 2022	7	
(Mexico) Antonio López	Pioneros de Cancún	Ciervos	1 – 6 (A)	8 October 2022	9	
(Mexico) Óscar García	Mazorqueros	Cañoneros	3 – 2 (H)	14 October 2022	10	
(Mexico) Daniel Rodríguez	Huracanes Izcalli	Atlético Angelópolis	4 – 2 (H)	22 October 2022	11	

(H) – Home; (A) – Away

=== Attendance ===
==== Per team ====
Pos	Team	Total	High	Low	Average	Change
1	Chilpancingo	5,022	1,800	522	1,004	n/a^{2}
2	Mazorqueros	2,600	2,000	100	520	+94.8%^{1}
3	Calor	950	250	200	190	−24.0%
4	Zitácuaro	950	300	50	190	n/a^{3}
5	T'hó Mayas	1,100	300	50	183	n/a^{3}
6	Pioneros de Cancún	720	350	70	180	n/a^{3}
7	Ciervos	550	150	50	110	+37.5%
8	Huracanes Izcalli	430	100	50	86	+56.4%
9	Cañoneros	460	100	50	77	+20.3%^{1}
10	Alebrijes de Oaxaca	250	100	50	63	−6.0%
11	Atlético Angelópolis	90	50	40	45	n/a^{3}
	League total	13,122	2,000	40	252	+75.0%

Source: Liga Premier FMF
Notes:
Only regular season listed
1: Team played Liga Premier – Serie A last season.
2: Team played Liga TDP last season.
3: Team did not play last season.

==== Highest and lowest ====
Highest attended					Lowest attended			
Week	Home	Score	Away	Attendance	Home	Score	Away	Attendance
1	Mazorqueros	2–1	Huracanes Izcalli	2,000	Alebrijes de Oaxaca	1–1	Calor	100
2	Chilpancingo	3–2	Zitácuaro	1,800	Huracanes Izcalli	0–1	Pioneros de Cancún	50
3	Ciervos	2–3	Calor	150	Zitácuaro	0–1	Huracanes Izcalli	50
4	Calor	2–2	T'hó Mayas	250	Cañoneros	3–0	Ciervos	100
5	T'hó Mayas	1–2	Pioneros de Cancún	200	Alebrijes de Oaxaca	2–1	Atlético Angelópolis	50
6	Chilpancingo	0–0	Calor	800	Cañoneros	3–2	T'hó Mayas	60
7	Calor	0–0	Huracanes Izcalli	200	Cañoneros	0–1	Chilpancingo	50
8	Chilpancingo	1–1	T'hó Mayas	800	Atlético Angelópolis	2–3	Calor	40
9	Chilpancingo	2–1	Huracanes Izcalli	522	Ciervos	1–6	Pioneros de Cancún	50
10	Pioneros de Cancún	1–2	Calor	350	Atlético Angelópolis	1–1	Chilpancingo	50
11	Chilpancingo	0–2	Mazorqueros	1,100	Calor	0–0	Zitácuaro	100

Source: Liga Premier FMF

1. Does not include matches played behind closed doors.

=== Liguilla ===
The best team of the regular season qualifies directly to the semifinals and the teams placed between the second and the seventh place qualify for the reclassification round (Repechaje). In the reclassification round, a single game will be played in the field of the best seeded team, the winner will advance to the semifinals, if there is a tie between both teams at the end of regular time, a penalty shoot-out will be held to define the winner. In the semifinals, if the two teams are tied on aggregate the higher seeded team advances. In the final, if the two teams are tied after both legs, the match goes to extra time and, if necessary, a penalty shoot-out.

==== Reclassification ====
The matches were played on 28 and 29 October

Team 1	Score	Team 2
Alebrijes de Oaxaca	1–0	T'hó Mayas
Pioneros de Cancún	3–0	Zitácuaro
Calor	1–1 (3–0 p)	Chilpancingo

- All rounds are played in a single game hosted by a higher seed
- If a game ends in a draw, it will proceed directly to a penalty shoot-out.

Matches

28 October 2022
18:45 CDT (UTC−5)

Alebrijes de Oaxaca	1–0	T'hó Mayas
Toledo 12'	Report

Estadio Tecnológico de Oaxaca, Oaxaca City, Oaxaca
Attendance: 800
Referee: Héctor Morales Leal

28 October 2022
20:00 CDT (UTC−5)

Calor	1–1	Chilpancingo
Ramírez 51'	Report	Arias 45'
Penalties
E. Díaz (penalty scored); J. Martínez (penalty missed); Robinson (penalty scored); Arana (penalty scored)	3–0	(penalty missed) Chávez; (penalty missed) Mata; (penalty missed) Toledo

Ciudad Deportiva Nora Leticia Rocha, Monclova, Coahuila
Attendance: 200
Referee: Oscar Javier Ramírez Flores

29 October 2022
17:00 EST (UTC−5)

Pioneros de Cancún	3–0	Zitácuaro
López 15'; Martínez 57'; Carpio 66'	Report

Estadio Andrés Quintana Roo, Cancún, Quintana Roo
Attendance: 250
Referee: Brian Jair Jiménez Morales

==== Bracket ====
Semi–finals
2	Alebrijes de Oaxaca	2	1	3
3	Pioneros de Cancún	1	0	1
1	Mazorqueros	0	0	0
4	Calor	1	2	3

Final
2	Alebrijes de Oaxaca	2	0	2
4	Calor	1	2	3

===== Semi–finals =====
The first legs were on 2 November, and the second legs will be played on 5 November 2022.

Team 1	Agg.	Team 2	1st leg	2nd leg
Mazorqueros	0–3	Calor	0–1	0–2
Alebrijes de Oaxaca	3–1	Pioneros de Cancún	2–1	1–0

First leg

2 November 2022	Pioneros de Cancún	1–2	Alebrijes de Oaxaca	Cancún, Quintana Roo
19:00 EST (UTC−5)	Rivas 90+1'	Report	Corona 5'; Toledo 73'	Stadium: Estadio Andrés Quintana Roo; Attendance: 300; Referee: Alfredo Huerta López

2 November 2022	Calor	1–0	Mazorqueros	Monclova, Coahuila
19:00 CST (UTC−6)	Robinson 42'	Report		Stadium: Ciudad Deportiva Nora Leticia Rocha; Attendance: 400; Referee: Héctor Morales Leal

Second leg

5 November 2022	Mazorqueros	0–2 (0–3 agg.)	Calor	Ciudad Guzmán, Jalisco
16:00 CST (UTC−6)		Report	Díaz 6'; Robinson 90+3'	Stadium: Estadio Municipal Santa Rosa; Attendance: 800; Referee: Oscar Yair Toledo Pineda

5 November 2022	Alebrijes de Oaxaca	1–0 (3–1 agg.)	Pioneros de Cancún	Oaxaca City, Oaxaca
18:00 CST (UTC−6)	Loera 58'	Report		Stadium: Estadio Tecnológico de Oaxaca; Attendance: 960; Referee: Diego Gilberto Gurrea Mendoza

===== Final =====
The first leg was played on 9 November, and the second leg was played on 12 November 2022.

Team 1	Agg.	Team 2	1st leg	2nd leg
Alebrijes de Oaxaca	2–3	Calor	2–1	0–2

First leg

9 November 2022	Calor	1–2	Alebrijes de Oaxaca	Monclova, Coahuila
19:00 CST (UTC−6)	Robinson 86'	Report	Toledo 11'; García 74'	Stadium: Ciudad Deportiva Nora Leticia Rocha; Attendance: 1,000; Referee: Adrián Chafino García

Second leg

12 November 2022	Alebrijes de Oaxaca	0–2 (2–3 agg.)	Calor	Oaxaca City, Oaxaca
18:00 CST (UTC−6)		Report	Cortez 20'; Robinson 25'	Stadium: Estadio Tecnológico de Oaxaca; Attendance: 2,769; Referee: Diego Gilberto Gurrea Mendoza

Apertura 2022 winners

1st title

== Torneo Clausura ==
The Torneo Clausura began on 7 January 2023.

=== Standings ===
Pos	Team	Pld	W	D	L	GF	GA	GD	BP	Pts	Qualification or relegation
1	Calor	10	7	2	1	20	5	+15	1	24	Qualification to semi-finals
2	T'hó Mayas	10	6	3	1	17	6	+11	2	23	Qualification to Reclassification
3	Pioneros de Cancún	10	6	2	2	18	6	+12	0	20	Qualification to Reclassification
4	Alebrijes de Oaxaca (C)	10	5	2	3	19	4	+15	0	17	Qualification to Reclassification
5	Chilpancingo	10	4	3	3	14	12	+2	1	16	Qualification to Reclassification
6	Huracanes Izcalli	10	4	2	4	15	15	0	1	15	Qualification to Reclassification
7	Mazorqueros	10	4	2	4	13	13	0	1	15	Qualification to Reclassification
8	Zitácuaro	10	2	5	3	15	12	+3	1	12	
9	Atlético Angelópolis	10	3	0	7	8	26	−18	0	9	
10	Ciervos	10	1	2	7	14	30	−16	1	6	
11	Cañoneros	10	1	1	8	9	33	−24	0	4	

Updated to match(es) played on 19 March 2023. Source: Liga Premier FMF
(C) Champions

=== Positions by round ===
Qualification to semi-finals
Qualification to reclassification
Last place in table

Team ╲ Round	1	2	3	4	5	6	7	8	9	10	11
Calor	6	8†	8	8	4	5	7	2	2	1	1
T'hó Mayas	8	4	1	3	3	2	1	1	1	2	2†
Pioneros de Cancún	3	1	2	1	1	1	2	3†	3	3	3
Alebrijes de Oaxaca	4	3	6	4	7	3	5	5	4	5†	4
Chilpancingo	11	7	4	6†	5	6	3	6	5	6	5
Huracanes Izcalli	2	6	5	7	8†	7	4	4	6	4	6
Mazorqueros	10	5	7	5	6	8	8†	7	7	7	7
Zitácuaro	1	2	3	2	2	4	6	8	8†	8	8
Atlético Angelópolis	5	9	9	11	9	9†	10	10	11	10	9
Ciervos	7†	10	10	9	10	10	9	9	9	9	10
Cañoneros	9	11	11†	10	11	11	11	11	10	11	11

Updated to match(es) played on 19 March 2023. Source: Liga Premier FMF
Notes: † indicates team rested that round

=== Results ===
Home \ Away	ALE	ANG	CAL	CAÑ	CHI	CIE	HUR	MAZ	PIO	THM	ZIT
Alebrijes de Oaxaca	—	—	—	10–0	—	4–0	1–0	2–0	—	0–0	1–0
Atlético Angelópolis	1–0	—	—	1–2	—	0–6	2–1	—	0–1	2–3	—
Calor	1–0	3–0	—	—	1–1	4–0	—	—	1–0	—	—
Cañoneros	—	—	0–5	—	—	—	2–3	1–2	—	—	1–2
Chilpancingo	2–1	1–2	—	2–0	—	2–1	—	—	0–1	—	—
Ciervos	—	—	—	1–1	—	—	0–2	2–4	—	—	3–3
Huracanes Izcalli	—	—	2–1	—	2–3	—	—	2–1	—	1–1	1–1
Mazorqueros	—	2–0	1–2	—	2–2	—	—	—	—	0–2	0–0
Pioneros de Cancún	0–0	—	—	5–2	—	6–0	3–1	0–1	—	1–1	—
T'hó Mayas	—	—	0–1	2–0	1–0	4–1	—	—	—	—	—
Zitácuaro	—	7–0	1–1	—	1–1	—	—	—	0–1	0–3	—

Updated to match(es) played on 19 March 2023. Source: Liga Premier FMF
Legend: Blue = home team win; Yellow = draw; Red = away team win.

=== Regular season statistics ===
==== Top goalscorers ====
Players sorted first by goals scored, then by last name.

Rank	Player	Club	Goals
1	(Mexico) Saúl Ramírez	T'hó Mayas	11
2	(Mexico) Daniel Rodríguez	Huracanes Izcalli	10
3	(Mexico) Jorge Salvatierra	Ciervos	7
4	(Mexico) Alexis Alejandre	Atlético Angelópolis	6
4	(Mexico) Víctor Rico	Zitácuaro	6
6	(Mexico) Ángel Crespo	Calor	5
7	(Mexico) Robinson García	Calor	4
7	(Mexico) Kevin Loera	Alebrijes de Oaxaca	4
7	(Mexico) Willian Terrones	Ciervos	4
10	(Mexico) Jesús Acatitlán	Chilpancingo	3
10	(Mexico) Guillermo Durán	T'hó Mayas	3
10	(Mexico) Yaír Espín	Mazorqueros	3
10	(Mexico) Óscar García	Mazorqueros	3
10	(Mexico) Armando León	Alebrijes de Oaxaca	3
10	(Mexico) Antonio López	Pioneros de Cancún	3
10	(Mexico) Juan José Gámez	Calor	3
10	(Mexico) Osvaldo Nava	Chilpancingo	3
10	(Mexico) Ernesto Reyes	Chilpancingo	3

Source:Liga Premier FMF

==== Hat-tricks ====
Player	For	Against	Result	Date	Round	Reference
(Mexico) Armando León	Alebrijes de Oaxaca	Cañoneros	10 – 0 (H)	14 January 2023	2	
(Mexico) Jorge Salvatierra	Ciervos	Atlético Angelópolis	0 – 6 (A)	17 February 2023	7	
(Mexico) Saúl Ramírez	T'hó Mayas	Atlético Angelópolis	2 – 3 (A)	14 March 2023	1	

(H) – Home; (A) – Away

=== Attendance ===
==== Per team ====
Pos	Team	Total	High	Low	Average	Change
1	Chilpancingo	2,550	700	350	510	−49.2%
2	Mazorqueros	1,500	500	500	300	−42.3%
3	Pioneros de Cancún	1,400	500	150	233	+29.4%
4	Calor	900	300	100	180	−5.3%
5	T'hó Mayas	550	200	100	138	−24.6%
6	Zitácuaro	680	200	80	136	−28.4%
7	Ciervos	450	200	50	113	+2.7%
8	Alebrijes de Oaxaca	650	100	100	108	+71.4%
9	Cañoneros	350	100	50	88	+14.3%
10	Huracanes Izcalli	390	100	40	78	−9.3%
11	Atlético Angelópolis	260	100	30	52	+15.6%
	League total	9,680	700	30	179	−29.0%

Source: Liga Premier FMF
Notes:
Only regular season listed

==== Highest and lowest ====
Highest attended					Lowest attended			
Week	Home	Score	Away	Attendance	Home	Score	Away	Attendance
1	Chilpancingo	0–1	Pioneros de Cancún	700	Huracanes Izcalli	2–1	Mazorqueros	50
2	Mazorqueros	2–0	Atlético Angelópolis	500	Zitácuaro	1–1	Chilpancingo	100
3	Mazorqueros	0–2	T'hó Mayas	500	Huracanes Izcalli	1–1	Zitácuaro	40
4	Pioneros de Cancún	0–1	Mazorqueros	200	T'hó Mayas	0–1	Calor	100
5	Chilpancingo	2–1	Ciervos	400	Cañoneros	0–5	Calor	50
6	Calor	1–1	Chilpancingo	300	Ciervos	0–2	Huracanes Izcalli	50
7	Chilpancingo	2–0	Cañoneros	700	Zitácuaro	0–3	T'hó Mayas	50
8	T'hó Mayas	1–0	Chilpancingo	200	Calor	3–0	Atlético Angelópolis	100
9	Pioneros de Cancún	6–0	Ciervos	500	Atlético Angelópolis	1–2	Cañoneros	30
10	Chilpancingo	1–2	Atlético Angelópolis	350	Cañoneros	1–2	Mazorqueros	100
11	Mazorqueros	2–2	Chilpancingo	200	Atlético Angelópolis	2–1	Huracanes Izcalli	30

Source: Liga Premier FMF

1. Does not include matches played behind closed doors.

=== Liguilla ===
The best team of the regular season qualifies directly to the semifinals and the teams placed between the second and the seventh place qualify for the reclassification round (Repechaje). In the reclassification round, a single game will be played in the field of the best seeded team, the winner will advance to the semifinals, if there is a tie between both teams at the end of regular time, a penalty shoot-out will be held to define the winner. In the semifinals, if the two teams are tied on aggregate the higher seeded team advances. In the final, if the two teams are tied after both legs, the match goes to extra time and, if necessary, a penalty shoot-out.

==== Reclassification ====
The matches were played on 25 and 26 March 2023

Team 1	Score	Team 2
T'hó Mayas	2–0	Mazorqueros
Pioneros de Cancún	1–0	Huracanes Izcalli
Alebrijes de Oaxaca	2–1	Chilpancingo

- All rounds are played in a single game hosted by a higher seed
- If a game ends in a draw, it will proceed directly to a penalty shoot-out.

Matches

25 March 2023
15:00 CST (UTC−6)

T'hó Mayas	2–0	Mazorqueros
González 24'; Mercado 49'	Report

Campo Hipólito Tzab, Homún, Yucatán
Attendance: 300
Referee: Adrián Jhonatan del Ángel Olán

25 March 2023
18:30 CST (UTC−6)

Alebrijes de Oaxaca	2–1	Chilpancingo
Quezada 13'; Loera 34'	Report	González 59'

Estadio Tecnológico de Oaxaca, Oaxaca City, Oaxaca
Attendance: 700
Referee: Rosario Guadalupe Cárdenas Morales

26 March 2023
17:00 EST (UTC−5)

Pioneros de Cancún	1–0	Huracanes Izcalli
Martínez 44'	Report

Estadio Andrés Quintana Roo, Cancún, Quintana Roo
Attendance: 200
Referee: Fernando Alexander Cruz Garatachea

==== Bracket ====
Semi–finals
2	T'hó Mayas (s)	1	0	1
3	Pioneros de Cancún	1	0	1
1	Calor	0	3	3
4	Alebrijes de Oaxaca	3	2	5

Final
2	T'hó Mayas	3	1	4
4	Alebrijes de Oaxaca (a.e.t.)	3	3	6

===== Semi-finals =====
The first legs were played on 1 April, and the second legs were played on 7 and 8 April 2023.

Team 1	Agg.	Team 2	1st leg	2nd leg
Calor	3–5	Alebrijes de Oaxaca	0–3	3–2
T'hó Mayas	s 1–1	Pioneros de Cancún	1–1	0–0

First leg

1 April 2023	Pioneros de Cancún	1–1	T'hó Mayas	Cancún, Quintana Roo
18:00 EST (UTC−5)	Reynoso 35'	Report	Rodríguez 78'	Stadium: Estadio Andrés Quintana Roo; Attendance: 800; Referee: Adrián Jhonatan del Ángel Olán

1 April 2023	Alebrijes de Oaxaca	3–0	Calor	Oaxaca City, Oaxaca
18:30 CST (UTC−6)	Loera 20'; Manzanares 56'; Galicia 69'	Report		Stadium: Estadio Tecnológico de Oaxaca; Attendance: 150; Referee: Jorge Alfonso Resendiz Espinoza

Second leg

7 April 2023	Calor	3–2 (3–5 agg.)	Alebrijes de Oaxaca	Monclova, Coahuila
19:30 CST (UTC−6)	Robinson 2'; Cortez 33'; Crespo 85'	Report	Lecourtois 13' (pen.); Loera 74'	Stadium: Ciudad Deportiva Nora Leticia Rocha; Attendance: 500; Referee: Julio César Gil Jiménez

8 April 2023	T'hó Mayas	0–0 (1–1 agg.)	Pioneros de Cancún	Homún, Yucatán
15:00 CST (UTC−6)		Report		Stadium: Campo Hipólito Tzab; Attendance: 1,000; Referee: Alan Cristobal Rodríguez Cancino

===== Final =====
The first leg was played on 15 April, and the second leg will be played on 22 or 23 April 2023.

Team 1	Agg.	Team 2	1st leg	2nd leg
T'hó Mayas	4–6	(a.e.t.) Alebrijes de Oaxaca	3–3	1–3

First leg

15 April 2023	Alebrijes de Oaxaca	3–3	T'hó Mayas	Oaxaca City, Oaxaca
18:30 CST (UTC−6)	León 49'; Quezada 61'; Galicia 86'	Report	González 16'; Méndez 56'; Lara 68'	Stadium: Estadio Tecnológico de Oaxaca; Attendance: 3,000; Referee: Héctor Morales Leal

Second leg

22 April 2023	T'hó Mayas	1–3 (a.e.t.) (4–6 agg.)	Alebrijes de Oaxaca	Mérida, Yucatán
16:00 CST (UTC−6)	Ramírez 65'	Report	León 37'; Ochoa 94'; Loera 109'	Stadium: Estadio Carlos Iturralde; Attendance: 2,000; Referee: Alan Cristobal Rodríguez Cancino

Clausura 2023 winners

1st title

== Coefficient table ==
P	Team	Pts	G	Pts/G	GD
1	Calor	42	20	2.100	+20
2	Alebrijes de Oaxaca	40	20	2.000	+23
3	Pioneros de Cancún	38	20	1.900	+17
4	T'hó Mayas	38	20	1.900	+14
5	Mazorqueros	38	20	1.900	+9
6	Chilpancingo	34	20	1.700	+5
7	Zitácuaro	28	20	1.400	+4
8	Huracanes Izcalli	26	20	1.300	–3
9	Cañoneros	17	20	0.850	–24
10	Ciervos	12	20	0.600	–30
11	Atlético Angelópolis	10	20	0.500	–34

Last updated: March 19, 2023
Source: Liga Premier FMF
P = Position; G = Games played; Pts = Points; Pts/G = Ratio of points to games played; GD = Goal difference

== Promotion Final ==
The Promotion Final is a series of matches played by the champions of the tournaments Apertura and Clausura, the game is played to determine the winning team of the promotion to Liga Premier – Serie A, as long as the winning team meets the league requirements.

The first leg will be played on 30 April 2023, and the second leg will be played on 7 May 2023.

Team 1	Agg.	Team 2	1st leg	2nd leg
Calor	4–4 (2–3) (p)	Alebrijes de Oaxaca	0–2	4–2

First leg

30 April 2023	Alebrijes de Oaxaca	2–0	Calor	Oaxaca City, Oaxaca
18:00 CST (UTC−6)	León 9'; Quezada 85' (pen.)	Report		Stadium: Estadio Tecnológico de Oaxaca; Attendance: 3,768; Referee: Carlos Gaytán Durán

Second leg

7 May 2023	Calor	4–2 (a.e.t.) (4–4 agg.) (2–3 p)	Alebrijes de Oaxaca	Monclova, Coahuila
11:30 CST (UTC−6)	Crespo 5', 119'; Díaz 93'; Robinson 102'	Report	León 91', 98'	Stadium: Ciudad Deportiva Nora Leticia Rocha; Attendance: 3,000; Referee: Rosario Guadalupe Cárdenas Morales
	Penalties
	Gámez (penalty missed); Crespo (penalty missed); Robinson (penalty scored); Arzate (penalty scored); Arana (penalty missed)		Quezada (penalty missed); Reyes (penalty scored); Morales (penalty missed); García (penalty scored); Lecourtois (penalty scored)

2022–23 winners

1st title

== See also ==
- 2022–23 Liga MX season
- 2022–23 Liga de Expansión MX season
- 2022–23 Serie A de México season
- 2022–23 Liga TDP season
- 2023 Copa Conecta
