= 2023–24 Serie B de México season =

Serie B de México
- Season: 2023–24
- Champions: Aguacateros CDU (3rd title)
- Promoted: Artesanos Metepec; Poza Rica
- Matches: 210
- Goals: 632 (3.01 per match)
- Top goalscorer: Sergio Vázquez (18 goals)
- Biggest home win: Ayense 7–0 Ciervos (2 September 2023)
- Biggest away win: Dongu 3–8 Ayense (25 August 2023)
- Highest scoring: Dongu 3–8 Ayense (25 August 2023)
- Longest winning run: 8 matches CDM
- Longest unbeaten run: 8 matches Ayense; CDM
- Longest winless run: 17 matches Ciervos
- Longest losing run: 11 matches Ciervos
- Highest attendance: 2,500; Ayense 1–1 Poza Rica (28 October 2023)
- Lowest attendance: 10; Cañoneros 5–2 Ciervos (17 February 2024)
- Total attendance: 54,590
- Average attendance: 283
- Stats are from the regular season only

The 2023–24 Serie B de México season is part of the third-tier football league of Mexico. The tournament began on 11 August 2023 and finished on 11 May 2024.

== Offseason changes ==
- On May 7, 2023 Alebrijes UABJO was promoted to Serie A. On June 15, 2023 the team was relocated to Reynosa and renamed C.F. Orgullo Reynosa.
- On May 21, 2023 Artesanos Metepec F.C. and C.D. Poza Rica were promoted to Serie B from Liga TDP.
- On June 15, 2023 C.D. Ayense was promoted to Serie B from Liga TDP through invitation.
- On June 30, 2023 Calor and Pioneros de Cancún were promoted to Serie A from Serie B.
- On June 30, 2023 Dongu and Pachuca were relocated at Serie B.
- On June 30, 2023 Atlético Angelópolis was put on hiatus.
- On June 30, 2023 Pachuca Premier merged with Atlético Pachuca, the new team will play as Pachuca Premier using the colors, name and shield of this team, however, it will be made up of players from both clubs and will have the status of reserve team of C.F. Pachuca, although it will be managed by the owners of Atlético. On July 18, 2023 the team was relocated to Atitalaquía.
- On June 30, 2023 Caja Oblatos, CDM and Chilangos joined the league as expansion teams.
- On June 30, 2023 the league format was modified, the single-season tournament was reinstated after two years with two tournaments per season.
- On July 18, 2023 Aguacateros CDU was relocated at Serie B.
- On July 18, 2023 T'HÓ Mayas F.C. and Tulancingo were put on hiatus.
- On July 20, 2023 Mazorqueros had dissolved. Santiago F.C. bought Mazorqueros's place in the Serie B and became a new participating team in this league. However Santiago F.C. entry into the league was announced two days before the dissolution of Mazorqueros F.C.

== Teams ==
Below are listed the member clubs of the Serie B for the 2023-24 season.

Location of teams in the 2023–24 Serie B

Club	Manager	City	Stadium	Capacity	Affiliate	Kit manufacturer	Shirt sponsor(s) front
Aguacateros CDU	(Mexico) Gerardo Castillo	Uruapan, Michoacán	Unidad Deportiva Hermanos López Rayón	5,000	–	JAG Sportswear	Agromich, Axen Capital, Allfruits
Artesanos Metepec	(Mexico) Juan Carlos Pedroza	Metepec, State of Mexico	Unidad Deportiva Alarcón Hisojo	2,000	–	Pirma, JAG Sportswear	Metepec, Refaccionaria El Arbol
Atlético Pachuca (Note: Franchise loan from Pachuca Premier)	(Mexico) Fausto Pinto (Note: Miguel Ángel Jiménez is registered as the manager, however Fausto Pinto holds the position primarily.)	Atitalaquía, Hidalgo	Municipal de Atitalaquia	3,000	Pachuca	Charly	–
Ayense	(Mexico) Conrado Castillo	Ayotlán, Jalisco	Chino Rivas	3,500	–	Marval	Las Villas Central Meat, El Mexicano
Caja Oblatos	(Mexico) Julio Sánchez	Zapotlanejo, Jalisco	Club Deportivo Zapotlanejo (Note: Caja Oblatos originally registered the Unidad Deportiva Cuauhtémoc as its field for the season, however, the club finally chose Centro Deportivo Zapotlanejo as its venue without knowing the reasons for the change.)	1,000	–	Reator	Caja Popular Oblatos, Armstrong Safe
Cañoneros	(Mexico) Jesús Fonseca	Milpa Alta, Mexico City	Momoxco	3,500	–	Joma	–
CDM	(Mexico) Juan Carlos Rico	Xochimilco, Mexico City	Valentín González	2,500	–	Joma	Zapaterías Azteca
Chilangos	(Mexico) Héctor Noriega	Benito Juárez, Mexico City	Jesús Martínez "Palillo" (Note: Chilangos F.C. originally registered the Estadio Ciudad de los Deportes as its field for the season, however, the club finally chose Estadio Jesús Martínez Palillo as its venue without knowing the reasons for the change.)	6,000	–	JAG Sportswear	–
Chilpancingo	(Mexico) Arturo Juárez	Chilpancingo, Guerrero	Polideportivo Chilpancingo	5,000	–	Scasth	Gasolineras Also, Pilgrims, Osorio Deportes
Ciervos	(Mexico) Jesús Téllez (Interim)	Chalco de Díaz Covarrubias, State of Mexico	Arreola	3,217	–	Corsa Sport	GOCA
Dongu	(Mexico) Román Reyes	Cuautitlán, State of Mexico	Los Pinos	5,000	–	Reator	–
Huracanes Izcalli	(Mexico) Jonathan Escobar	Cuautitlán Izcalli, State of Mexico	Hugo Sánchez Márquez	3,500	–	Keuka	–
Poza Rica	(Mexico) Enrique Escudero	Poza Rica, Veracruz	Heriberto Jara Corona	10,000	–	Silver Sport	–
Santiago	(Mexico) Martín Moreno	Santiago, Nuevo León	FCD El Barrial	1,300	–	Edcor	–
Zitácuaro	(Mexico) Mario Alberto Trejo	Zitácuaro, Michoacán	Ignacio López Rayón	10,000	–	BS	Grupo Orihuela

== Regular season ==
=== Standings ===
Pos	Team	Pld	W	D	L	GF	GA	GD	BP	Pts	Qualification or relegation
1	Ayense	28	21	3	4	81	33	+48	7	73	Qualification to Semi–finals
2	Aguacateros CDU (C)	28	19	3	6	63	24	+39	5	65	Qualification to Reclassification
3	Artesanos Metepec	28	18	4	6	47	20	+27	3	61	Qualification to Reclassification
4	CDM	28	16	6	6	68	27	+41	6	60	Qualification to Reclassification
5	Santiago	28	16	7	5	43	20	+23	3	58	Qualification to Reclassification
6	Chilpancingo	28	17	2	9	50	27	+23	4	57	Qualification to Reclassification
7	Atlético Pachuca	28	16	4	8	52	35	+17	5	57	Qualification to Reclassification
8	Poza Rica	28	13	4	11	42	36	+6	1	44	
9	Chilangos	28	11	5	12	40	41	−1	4	42	
10	Caja Oblatos	28	7	6	15	32	59	−27	2	29	
11	Huracanes Izcalli	28	7	6	15	31	45	−14	1	28	
12	Zitácuaro	28	5	8	15	23	50	−27	2	25	
13	Cañoneros	28	5	2	21	16	49	−33	0	17	
14	Dongu	28	4	2	22	29	81	−52	1	15	
15	Ciervos	28	3	2	23	15	85	−70	1	12	

Updated to match(es) played on 20 April 2024. Source: Liga Premier FMF
(C) Champions

=== Positions by round ===
Qualification to Semi-finals
Qualification to Reclassification
Last place in table

Team ╲ Round	1	2	3	4	5	6	7	8	9	10	11	12	13	14	15	16	17	18	19	20	21	22	23	24	25	26	27	28	29	30
Ayense	4	3	1	1	3	4†	4	4	2	4	4	4	3	3	1	3	2	2	2	1	2†	2	1	1	1	1	1	1	1	1
ACDU	3	9	9	8	6	8	8	6	7	8†	7	6	7	6	6	5	4	3	3	3	3	3	3	2	2†	2	2	2	2	2
Metepec	13	6	8	9†	11	9	10	10	9	7	9	10	9	8	7	7	5	5	6†	5	6	7	5	4	4	3	3	4	4	3
CDM	15	4	3	4	4	3	2	2	1	1	1	1	2†	2	3	2	1	1	1	2	1	1	2	3	3	4	4	3†	3	4
Santiago	1	1	2	5	5†	5	3	3	5	5	5	5	5	5	5	6	7	7	7	7†	5	6	7	6	6	6	5	5	5	5
Chilpancingo	10†	7	5	2	1	1	1	1	4	3	3	3	4	4	4	4†	6	6	5	6	7	5	4	5	5	5	6	6	6	6
At. Pachuca	7	8†	6	3	2	2	5	5	3	2	2	2	1	1	2	1	3†	4	4	4	4	4	6	7	7	7	7	7	7	7
Poza Rica	12	5	7	7	8	7	6	7	6	6	6	7	6	7	8†	8	8	8	9	9	8	8	8	8	8	8	8	8	8	8†
Chilangos	6	11	11	13	14	14	14	14	11	11	11†	11	11	10	10	9	9	9	8	8	9	9	9	9	9	9†	9	9	9	9
Oblatos	8	12	12†	12	13	13	13	12	13	13	13	12	12	12	12	12	12	12†	12	12	12	12	12	12	12	10	10	11	10	10
Huracanes	5	10	10	11	9	10	9	9	10	10	10	9	8	9	9	10	11	11	10	10	10	10	11	11	10	11	11	10	11†	11
Zitácuaro	2	2	4	6	7	6	7	8	8	9	8	8†	10	11	11	11	10	10	11	11	11	11	10	10	11	12	12†	12	12	12
Cañoneros	9	13	13	14	15	15	15	15†	15	15	15	15	15	14	15	15	15	15	15	15	14	13	13†	13	13	13	13	13	13	13
Dongu	14	15	15	10	12	12	12	13	14†	14	14	14	14	15	14	14	14	14	14	13	13	14	14	14†	14	14	14	14	14	14
Ciervos	11	14	14	15	10	11	11†	11	12	12	12	13	13	13	13	13	13	13	13	14	15	15†	15	15	15	15	15	15	15	15

Updated to match(es) played on 20 April 2024. Source: Liga Premier FMF
Notes: † indicates team rested that round

=== Results ===
Home \ Away	ADU	ART	ATP	AYE	CAJ	CAÑ	CDM	CHG	CHP	CIE	DON	HUR	PZR	SAN	ZIT
Aguacateros CDU	—	4–2	0–1	4–4	3–0	1–0	1–0	3–1	4–1	5–1	5–0	3–1	2–1	1–2	6–0
Artesanos Metepec	1–0	—	1–3	3–2	5–0	3–0	0–1	2–1	3–0	2–0	4–0	3–0	1–0	1–0	1–0
Atlético Pachuca	0–2	3–1	—	5–3	2–0	3–1	1–4	3–1	0–0	2–1	5–2	4–1	2–0	1–0	1–1
Ayense	1–3	1–0	3–0	—	7–1	3–0	2–3	3–2	4–1	7–0	2–1	3–0	1–1	1–0	5–1
Caja Oblatos	0–0	0–1	1–0	2–4	—	1–0	2–1	1–2	1–2	3–0	3–1	1–1	1–2	2–2	1–3
Cañoneros	0–4	0–1	0–1	0–1	1–0	—	1–5	1–3	0–2	5–2	1–0	0–1	1–0	0–1	1–0
CDM	3–0	2–2	1–1	0–3	5–0	0–0	—	3–0	0–2	5–0	5–0	3–0	1–0	2–1	5–1
Chilangos	0–1	1–1	2–1	1–2	1–1	1–1	3–2	—	1–2	3–0	2–0	1–1	0–0	1–3	1–0
Chilpancingo	1–0	1–0	0–2	0–1	5–1	6–0	0–0	1–2	—	3–0	3–1	3–1	3–0	1–2	5–0
Ciervos	1–4	0–3	0–3	0–3	1–1	1–0	0–5	1–3	0–3	—	0–4	1–4	0–4	0–1	1–1
Dongu	2–3	0–3	1–1	3–8	0–3	1–0	1–5	0–5	0–1	1–3	—	2–1	1–2	2–4	2–0
Huracanes Izcalli	0–0	1–2	3–1	0–1	1–2	1–0	0–3	0–2	0–1	5–1	4–1	—	3–2	1–1	0–1
Poza Rica	0–3	0–1	1–0	0–2	4–2	3–1	2–2	3–0	2–1	4–0	2–1	2–0	—	1–0	4–3
Santiago	1–0	0–0	2–1	1–1	4–1	1–0	2–2	3–0	2–0	1–0	4–0	1–1	2–0	—	2–0
Zitácuaro	0–1	0–0	1–3	1–3	1–1	3–2	2–0	2–0	0–2	0–1	0–0	0–0	2–2	0–0	—

Updated to match(es) played on 20 April 2024. Source: Liga Premier FMF
Legend: Blue = home team win; Yellow = draw; Red = away team win.

=== Regular season statistics ===
==== Top goalscorers ====
Players sorted first by goals scored, then by last name.

Rank	Player	Club	Goals
1	(Mexico) Sergio Vázquez	Aguacateros CDU	18
2	(Mexico) Diego Márquez	CDM	17
3	(Mexico) David Collazo	Atlético Pachuca	16
4	(Mexico) Edson Cibrián	CDM	15
5	(Mexico) Raúl Magallón	Ayense	14
5	(Mexico) Osvaldo Nava	Chilpancingo	14
7	(Mexico) Isaac Medina	Ayense	13
8	(Mexico) Arturo Martínez	Santiago	12
9	(Mexico) César Delgado	Ayense	11
10	(Mexico) Mauricio Farjeat	Chilangos	10
10	(Mexico) Adrián Garza	Atlético Pachuca	10

Source:Liga Premier FMF

==== Hat-tricks ====
Player	For	Against	Result	Date	Round	Reference
(Mexico) Isaac Medina	Ayense	Dongu	3 – 8 (A)	25 August 2023	3	
(Mexico) Raúl Magallón	Ayense	Ciervos	7 – 0 (H)	2 September 2023	4	
(Mexico) José Arturo Martínez	Santiago	Caja Oblatos	4 – 1 (H)	10 November 2023	14	
(Mexico) Francisco Muñoz	CDM	Dongu	1 – 5 (A)	19 January 2024	17	
(Mexico) Gerson Villarreal	Huracanes Izcalli	Dongu	4 – 1 (H)	3 February 2024	19	
(Mexico) Sergio Vázquez	Aguacateros CDU	Cañoneros	0 – 4 (A)	9 March 2024	24	
(Mexico) Diego Márquez	CDM	Ciervos	0 – 5 (A)	3 April 2024	26	
(Mexico) Sergio Vázquez	Aguacateros CDU	Zitácuaro	6 – 0 (H)	6 April 2024	28	

(H) – Home; (A) – Away

=== Attendance ===
==== Per team ====
Pos	Team	Total	High	Low	Average	Change
1	Ayense	13,328	2,500	400	952	n/a^{2}
2	Poza Rica	10,560	1,500	400	754	n/a^{2}
3	Chilpancingo	6,412	1,500	270	458	−10.2%
4	Aguacateros CDU	5,350	1,000	250	412	−43.2%^{1}
5	Artesanos Metepec	3,000	500	100	214	n/a^{2}
6	Zitácuaro	2,850	350	100	204	+50.0%
7	Santiago	2,420	600	70	202	n/a^{2,3}
8	CDM	2,520	500	50	180	n/a^{2}
9	Atlético Pachuca	1,780	250	30	127	n/a^{2}
10	Caja Oblatos	1,630	500	50	125	n/a^{2}
11	Dongu	1,270	150	20	98	−38.0%^{1}
12	Ciervos	1,180	150	50	91	−19.5%
13	Chilangos	990	100	30	71	n/a^{2}
14	Huracanes Izcalli	820	100	50	63	−19.2%
15	Cañoneros	480	50	10	44	−50.0%^{3}
	League total	54,590	2,500	10	283	+58.1%

Source: Liga Premier FMF
Notes:
Only regular season listed
1: Team played Liga Premier – Serie A last season.
2: Team played Liga TDP last season.
3: The team had at least one match canceled for administrative issues.

==== Highest and lowest ====
Highest attended					Lowest attended			
Week	Home	Score	Away	Attendance	Home	Score	Away	Attendance
1	Ayense	1–0	Artesanos Metepec	2,000	Dongu	2–4	Santiago	100
2	Poza Rica	3–0	Chilangos	680	Zitácuaro	0–0	Huracanes Izcalli	200
3	Aguacateros CDU	0–1	Atlético Pachuca	250	Chilangos	1–2	Chilpancingo	100
4	Poza Rica	2–2	CDM	1,030	Atlético Pachuca	3–1	Chilangos	30
5	Aguacateros CDU	4–2	Artesanos Metepec	350	Dongu	1–3	Ciervos	100
6	Poza Rica	2–1	Dongu	1,050	Santiago	1–0	Aguacateros CDU	70
7	Aguacateros CDU	4–4	Ayense	1,000	Huracanes Izcalli	3–1	Atlético Pachuca	100
8	Ayense	3–2	Chilangos	1,000	Caja Oblatos	1–1	Huracanes Izcalli	50
9	Poza Rica	4–2	Caja Oblatos	1,000	Chilangos	3–0	Ciervos	50
10	Ayense	2–3	CDM	500	Cañoneros	1–3	Chilangos	50
11	Poza Rica	1–0	Santiago	900	Dongu	2–3	Aguacateros CDU	20
12	Ayense	1–1	Poza Rica	2,500	Caja Oblatos	3–1	Dongu	50
13	Poza Rica	4–0	Ciervos	800	Dongu	0–5	Chilangos	50
14	Ayense	3–0	Atlético Pachuca	1,200	Chilangos	1–0	Zitácuaro	50
15	Chilpancingo	6–0	Cañoneros	1,500	Huracanes Izcalli	0–0	Aguacateros CDU	50
16	Poza Rica	0–3	Aguacateros CDU	1,500	Huracanes Izcalli	0–2	Chilangos	50
17	Ayense	1–0	Santiago	1,000	Chilangos	0–0	Poza Rica	30
18	Ayense	2–1	Dongu	658	Huracanes Izcalli	0–3	CDM	50
19	Aguacateros CDU	3–0	Caja Oblatos	500	Cañoneros	0–1	Santiago	50
20	Ayense	3–0	Cañoneros	570	Atlético Pachuca	1–1	Zitácuaro	100
21	Aguacateros CDU	1–2	Santiago	300	Cañoneros	5–2	Ciervos	10
22	Ayense	1–3	Aguacateros CDU	400	Cañoneros	1–0	Dongu	50
23	Poza Rica	1–0	Atlético Pachuca	600	Chilangos	1–2	Ayense	30
24	Ayense	5–1	Zitácuaro	1,000	Ciervos	1–3	Chilangos	50
25	Poza Rica	0–1	Artesanos Metepec	500	Huracanes Izcalli	1–1	Santiago	50
26	Aguacateros CDU	5–0	Dongu	600	Cañoneros	1–0	Zitácuaro	50
27	Chilpancingo	1–2	Santiago	200	Huracanes Izcalli	5–1	Ciervos	50
28	Santiago	2–1	Atlético Pachuca	600	Cañoneros	0–1	Huracanes Izcalli	40
29	Poza Rica	3–1	Cañoneros	500	Atlético Pachuca	5–3	Ayense	50
30	Ayense	7–1	Caja Oblatos	600	Cañoneros	0–2	Chilpancingo	30

Source: Liga Premier FMF

1. Does not include matches played behind closed doors.

== Liguilla ==
The best team of the regular season qualifies directly to the semifinals and the teams placed between the second and the seventh place qualify for the reclassification round (Repechaje). In the reclassification round the winner will advance to the semifinals, if there is a tie between both teams at the end of regular time, a penalty shoot-out will be held to define the winner. In the semifinals, if the two teams are tied on aggregate the higher seeded team advances. In the final, if the two teams are tied after both legs, the match goes to extra time and, if necessary, a penalty shoot-out.

=== Reclassification ===
The first legs were played on 24 April, and the second legs were played on 27 April 2024.

Team 1	Agg.	Team 2	1st leg	2nd leg
Aguacateros CDU	4–3	Atlético Pachuca	0–3	4–0
Artesanos Metepec	4–1	Chilpancingo	2–1	2–0
CDM	2–4	Santiago	1–3	1–1

First leg

24 April 2024	Chilpancingo	1–2	Artesanos Metepec	Chilpancingo, Guerrero
12:00 CST (UTC−6)	Linares 9'	Report	Flores 17'; Fuentes 20'	Stadium: Polideportivo Chilpancingo; Attendance: 230; Referee: Guillermo Estrada Rea

24 April 2024	Atlético Pachuca	3–0	Aguacateros CDU	Atitalaquía, Hidalgo
16:00 CST (UTC−6)	Dylan Ramírez 49'; Corona 51'; García 84'	Report		Stadium: Estadio Municipal de Atitalaquia; Attendance: 200; Referee: Edwin Eduardo Morfín Verduzco

24 April 2024	Santiago	3–1	CDM	Santiago, Nuevo León
19:00 CST (UTC−6)	Martínez 4', 46'; Sánchez 45'	Report	Soria 68'	Stadium: Cancha FCD El Barrial; Attendance: 500; Referee: Jorge Alfonso Resendiz Espinoza

Second leg

27 April 2024	Aguacateros CDU	4–0 (4–3 agg.)	Atlético Pachuca	Uruapan, Michoacán
16:00 CST (UTC−6)	Castrejón 13'; Pahua 20'; Muñoz 35'; Ortiz 84'	Report		Stadium: Unidad Deportiva Hermanos López Rayón; Attendance: 750; Referee: Marco Antonio Návez Hernández

27 April 2024	Artesanos Metepec	2–0 (4–1 agg.)	Chilpancingo	Metepec, State of Mexico
16:00 CST (UTC−6)	Ruiz 3'; Flores 70'	Report		Stadium: Unidad Deportiva Alarcón Hisojo; Attendance: 300; Referee: José Maximiliano Negrete Preciado

27 April 2024	CDM	1–1 (2–4 agg.)	Santiago	Chalco, State of Mexico
16:00 CST (UTC−6)	Mora 8'	Report	Morales 84'	Stadium: Estadio Arreola; Attendance: 200; Referee: Oscar Yair Toledo Pineda

=== Bracket ===
Semi–finals
1	Ayense (s)	0	1	1
5	Santiago	1	0	1
2	Aguacateros CDU	0	1	1
3	Artesanos Metepec	0	0	0

Final
1	Ayense	0	2	2
2	Aguacateros CDU	2	1	3

==== Semi–finals ====
The first legs were played on 1 May, and the second legs were played on 4 May 2024.

Team 1	Agg.	Team 2	1st leg	2nd leg
Ayense (s)	1–1	Santiago	0–1	1–0
Aguacateros CDU	1–0	Artesanos Metepec	0–0	1–0

First leg

1 May 2024	Artesanos Metepec	0–0	Aguacateros CDU	Metepec, State of Mexico
16:00 CST (UTC−6)		Report		Stadium: Unidad Deportiva Alarcón Hisojo; Attendance: 500; Referee: Jorge Alfonso Resendiz Espinoza

1 May 2024	Santiago	1–0	Ayense	Santiago, Nuevo León
19:00 CST (UTC−6)	Martínez 39'	Report		Stadium: Cancha FCD El Barrial; Attendance: 400; Referee: Edwin Eduardo Morfín Verduzco

Second leg

4 May 2024	Aguacateros CDU	1–0 (1–0 agg.)	Artesanos Metepec	Uruapan, Michoacán
16:00 CST (UTC−6)	Castrejón 14'	Report		Stadium: Unidad Deportiva Hermanos López Rayón; Attendance: 1,000; Referee: José Maximiliano Negrete Preciado

4 May 2024	Ayense	1–0 (1–1 agg.)	Santiago	Ayotlán, Jalisco
18:00 CST (UTC−6)	López 62'	Report		Stadium: Estadio Chino Rivas; Attendance: 2,000; Referee: Marco Antonio Návez Hernández

==== Final ====
The first leg was played on 8 May, and the second leg was played on 11 May 2024.

Team 1	Agg.	Team 2	1st leg	2nd leg
Ayense	2–3	Aguacateros CDU	0–2	2–1

First leg

8 May 2024	Aguacateros CDU	2–0	Ayense	Uruapan, Michoacán
17:00 CST (UTC−6)	Sandoval 24'; Vázquez 30'	Report		Stadium: Unidad Deportiva Hermanos López Rayón; Attendance: 1,800; Referee: José Maximiliano Negrete Preciado

Second leg

11 May 2024	Ayense	2–1 (2–3 agg.)	Aguacateros CDU	Ayotlán, Jalisco
18:00 CST (UTC−6)	Delgado 19'; Ávila 69'	Report	Sandoval 63'	Stadium: Estadio Chino Rivas; Attendance: 3,000; Referee: Marco Antonio Návez Hernández

2023–24 winners

3rd title

== Coefficient table ==
P	Team	Pts	G	Pts/G	GD
1	Ayense	73	28	2.607	+48
2	Aguacateros CDU	65	28	2.321	+39
3	Artesanos Metepec	61	28	2.222	+27
4	CDM	60	28	2.143	+41
5	Santiago	58	28	2.071	+23
6	Chilpancingo	57	28	2.036	+23
7	Atlético Pachuca	57	28	2.036	+17
8	Poza Rica	44	28	1.571	+6
9	Chilangos	41	28	1.464	–1
10	Caja Oblatos	29	28	1.036	–27
11	Huracanes Izcalli	28	28	1.000	–14
12	Zitácuaro	25	28	0.893	–27
13	Cañoneros	17	28	0.607	–33
14	Dongu	15	28	0.536	–51
15	Ciervos	12	28	0.429	–70

Last updated: April 20, 2024
Source: Liga Premier FMF
P = Position; G = Games played; Pts = Points; Pts/G = Ratio of points to games played; GD = Goal difference

== See also ==
- 2023–24 Liga MX season
- 2023–24 Liga de Expansión MX season
- 2023–24 Serie A de México season
- 2023–24 Liga TDP season
