= 2023 Copa Conecta =

Tournament details
- Country: Mexico
- Dates: 17 January 2023 – 13 March 2023
- Teams: 32

Final positions
- Champions: Inter Playa del Carmen (1st title)
- Runner-up: Calor

Tournament statistics
- Matches played: 31
- Goals scored: 77 (2.48 per match)

The 2023 Copa Conecta was the 2nd edition of the Copa Conecta, a knockout competition for Mexican football clubs from Liga Premier and Liga TDP.

The Copa Conecta is an official Mexican tournament that was created in 2021 with the aim of providing a greater opportunity for development to the football players of the Premier and TDP league teams.

== Qualified teams ==
Teams classified at the worst third ranked; fourth place of the 3 groups and Reserve Team champions at Serie A, and the teams ranked in places 1–7 of Serie B.

- Alebrijes de Oaxaca (Serie B – 2nd Place)
- Calor (Serie B – 4th Place)
- Chilpancingo (Serie B – 5th Place)
- Inter Playa del Carmen (Serie A, Group 3 – 5th Place)
- Mazorqueros (Serie B – 1st Place)
- Montañeses (Serie A, Group 3 – 4th Place)
- Pachuca (Serie A, Group 3 – 1st Place, Reserve Teams Champions)
- Pioneros de Cancún (Serie B – 3rd Place)
- Saltillo (Serie A, Group 2 – 4th Place)
- T'hó Mayas (Serie B – 7th Place)
- Tritones Vallarta (Serie A, Group 1 – 4th Place)
- Zitácuaro (Serie B – 6th Place)

Teams classified at the first place of the 18 groups of the Liga TDP and the top 2 classified in the league coefficient table.

- Artesanos Metepec – (Liga TDP – Group 6)
- Atlético Chavinda – (Liga TDP – Group 11)
- Búhos de Oaxaca – (Liga TDP – Group 2)
- Chihuahua – (Liga TDP – Group 17)
- Delfines UGM – (Liga TDP – Group 3)
- Deportiva Venados – (Liga TDP – Group 1)
- Diablos Tesistán – (Liga TDP – Group 13)
- Dorados de Sinaloa – (Liga TDP – Group 15)
- Halcones Negros – (Liga TDP – Group 8)
- London – (Liga TDP – Group 18)
- Mexiquense – (Liga TDP – Group 5)
- Mineros Reynosa – (Liga TDP – Group 16)
- Muxes – (Liga TDP – Group 4)
- Orgullo Surtam – (Liga TDP – Group 9)
- Poza Rica – (Liga TDP – Group 9, Classified by Coefficient)
- Tepatitlán – (Liga TDP – Group 12)
- Tigres Yautepec – (Liga TDP – Group 7)
- Titanes de Querétaro – (Liga TDP – Group 10)
- Toluca – (Liga TDP – Group 6, Classified by Coefficient)
- Tuzos UAZ – (Liga TDP – Group 11)

== Bracket ==
Round of 32
Tepatitlán "B"	1
Tritones Vallarta	0
Titanes de Querétaro	2
Halcones Negros	1
Atlético Chavinda	3
Mazorqueros	1
Artesanos Metepec	0
Zitácuaro	1
Diablos Tesistán	2
Dorados de Sinaloa "B"	1
London	0
Chihuahua "B"	1
Tuzos UAZ "B"	0
Calor	3
Mineros Reynosa	0
Saltillo	1
Orgullo Surtam	1
Poza Rica	2
Delfines UGM	0
Montañeses
Mexiquense	2
Muxes	1
Toluca "B"	0
Pachuca "B"	2
Tigres Yautepec	2
Chilpancingo	0
Búhos de Oaxaca	1
Alebrijes de Oaxaca "B"	5
Deportiva Venados "B"	2
T'hó Mayas	1
Inter Playa del Carmen	2
Pioneros de Cancún	1

Round of 16
Tepatitlán "B" (p.)	2 (4)
Titanes de Querétaro	2 (3)
Atlético Chavinda	4
Zitácuaro	0
Diablos Tesistán	0
Chihuahua "B"	1
Calor	1
Saltillo	0
Poza Rica	2
Montañeses	1
Mexiquense	0
Pachuca "B"	4
Tigres Yautepec	1
Alebrijes de Oaxaca "B"	2
Deportiva Venados "B"	1
Inter Playa del Carmen	3

Quarter–finals
Tepatitlán "B" (p.)	1 (3)
Atlético Chavinda	1 (1)
Chihuahua "B"	0 (1)
Calor (p.)	0 (3)
Poza Rica	1
Pachuca "B"	0
Alebrijes de Oaxaca "B"	0 (4)
Inter Playa del Carmen (p.)	0 (5)

Semi–finals
Tepatitlán "B"	0
Calor	1
Poza Rica	1
Inter Playa del Carmen	4

Final
Calor	0
Inter Playa del Carmen	2

== Matches ==
=== Round of 32 ===
The matches will be played on 17, 18 and 19 January 2023.

Team 1	Score	Team 2
Inter Playa del Carmen	2–1	Pioneros de Cancún
Deportiva Venados "B"	2–1	T'hó Mayas
Delfines UGM	0–3	Montañeses
Búhos de Oaxaca	1–5	Alebrijes de Oaxaca "B"
Tigres Yautepec	2–0	Chilpancingo
Mexiquense	2–1	Muxes
Artesanos Metepec	0–1	Zitácuaro
Toluca "B"	0–2	Pachuca "B"
Atlético Chavinda	3–1	Mazorqueros
Titanes de Querétaro	2–1	Halcones Negros
Tuzos UAZ "B"	0–3	Calor
Tepatitlán "B"	1–0	Tritones Vallarta
Diablos Tesistán	2–1	Dorados de Sinaloa "B"
London	0–1	Chihuahua "B"
Mineros Reynosa	0–1	Saltillo
Orgullo Surtam	1–2	Poza Rica

Matches

17 January 2023	Tigres Yautepec	2–0	Chilpancingo	Yautepec, Morelos
17:00 CST (UTC−6)	Barrios 85'; Ayala 90'	Report		Stadium: Centro Deportivo Yautepec; Attendance: 800; Referee: Jonathan Arturo Betancourt Galindo

17 January 2023	London	0–1	Chihuahua	Tijuana, Baja California
18:00 PST (UTC−8)		Report	Garay 71'	Stadium: Unidad Deportiva CREA; Referee: Carlos Omar Cruz Busani

17 January 2023	Inter Playa del Carmen	2–1	Pioneros de Cancún	Playa del Carmen, Quintana Roo
19:00 EST (UTC−5)	Celada 26'; Hernández 42'	Report	Segura 87'	Stadium: Unidad Deportiva Mario Villanueva Madrid; Attendance: 300; Referee: Omar Salazar Euan

18 January 2023	Toluca "B"	0–2	Pachuca "B"	Metepec, State of Mexico
10:00 CST (UTC−6)		Report	Palma 1'; Bautista 70'	Stadium: Instalaciones de Metepec; Attendance: 50; Referee: Itzel Hernández Fuentes

18 January 2023	Mexiquense	2–1	Muxes	Mexico City
13:00 CST (UTC−6)	Cibrián 32'; Muñoz 85'	Report	Jiménez 45'	Stadium: Deportivo Plutarco Elías Calles; Attendance: 500; Referee: Carlos Jesús Gaytán Durán

18 January 2023	Deportiva Venados "B"	2–1	T'hó Mayas	Tamanché, Yucatán
15:00 CST (UTC−6)	Torres 22'; Medina 61'	Report	Ramírez 86'	Stadium: Estadio Alonso Diego Molina; Attendance: 300; Referee: Edson Enrique Castañón Ramírez

18 January 2023	Delfines UGM	0–3	Montañeses	Nogales, Veracruz
15:00 CST (UTC−6)		Report	Osorio 33'; Villa 45'; Zamora 61'	Stadium: Estadio UGM; Attendance: 500; Referee: Oliver Hernández Fuentes

18 January 2023	Artesanos Metepec	0–1	Zitácuaro	Metepec, State of Mexico
15:00 CST (UTC−6)		Report	Seay 90'	Stadium: Estadio La Hortaliza; Attendance: 300; Referee: Miguel Ángel Morales Sánchez

18 January 2023	Orgullo Surtam	1–2	Poza Rica	Tampico, Tamaulipas
15:30 CST (UTC−6)	Guerrero 56'	Report	Reyes 40'; Cruz 68'	Stadium: Estadio Olímpico de la Unidad Deportiva; Attendance: Juan Jesús Selvera Parada; Referee: 80

18 January 2023	Tuzos UAZ "B"	0–3	Calor	Zacatecas City, Zacatecas
15:30 CST (UTC−6)		Report	Crespo 63', 74'; Robinson 83'	Stadium: Estadio Universitario Unidad Deportiva Norte; Attendance: 60; Referee: Zahid Sebastián Manjarrez García

18 January 2023	Búhos de Oaxaca	1–5	Alebrijes de Oaxaca "B"	Oaxaca City, Oaxaca
16:00 CST (UTC−6)	Cruz 2'	Report	Manzanares 11'; Choreño 17'; Zaragoza 24'; Rodelo 34'; Loera 43'	Stadium: Estadio Tecnológico de Oaxaca; Attendance: 200; Referee: Fernando González Martínez

18 January 2023	Titanes de Querétaro	2–1	Halcones Negros	San José Iturbide, Guanajuato
16:00 CST (UTC−6)	Marín 90', 92'	Report	Cortés 38'	Stadium: Unidad Deportiva San José Iturbide; Attendance: 100; Referee: Ricardo Emmanuel Chávez Sánchez

18 January 2023	Atlético Chavinda	3–1	Mazorqueros	Chavinda, Michoacán
16:00 CST (UTC−6)	Espinosa 7'; Ayala 57'; Ochoa 79'	Report	García 59'	Stadium: Club Campestre Chavinda; Attendance: 300; Referee: Axel Jesús Ibares González

18 January 2023	Mineros Reynosa	0–1	Saltillo	Reynosa, Tamaulipas
17:00 CST (UTC−6)		Report	Urbina 36'	Stadium: Unidad Deportiva Solidaridad; Attendance: 300; Referee: Juan Daniel Peña Garza

18 January 2023	Tepatitlán "B"	1–0	Tritones Vallarta	Tepatitlán, Jalisco
17:00 CST (UTC−6)	Plasencia 73'	Report		Stadium: Estadio Gregorio "Tepa" Gómez; Attendance: 200; Referee: Héctor Emilio Contreras Sotelo

19 January 2023	Diablos Tesistán	2–1	Dorados de Sinaloa "B"	Zapopan, Jalisco
16:00 CST (UTC−6)	Navarro 51'; Mejía 56'	Report	Beltrán 90'	Stadium: Club Diablos Tesistán; Attendance: 300; Referee: Edwin Eduardo Morfín Verduzco

=== Round of 16 ===
Team 1	Score	Team 2
Deportiva Venados "B"	1–3	Inter Playa del Carmen
Tigres Yautepec	1–2	Alebrijes de Oaxaca "B"
Poza Rica	2–1	Montañeses
Mexiquense	0–4	Pachuca "B"
Atlético Chavinda	4–0	Zitácuaro
Tepatitlán "B"	(p.) 2–2 (4–3)	Titanes de Querétaro
Calor	1–0	Saltillo
Diablos Tesistán	0–1	Chihuahua "B"

Matches

31 January 2023	Mexiquense	0–4	Pachuca "B"	Toluca, State of Mexico
14:00 CST (UTC−6)		Report	Gámez 5', 27'; Mustre 28'; González 37'	Stadium: Estadio FMF Cancha 1 Attendance: 200; Referee: Kevin José González Méndez

31 January 2023	Tepatitlán "B"	2–2 (4–3 p)	Titanes de Querétaro	Tepatitlán, Jalisco
17:00 CST (UTC−6)	Arias 57'; Aceves 64'	Report	Albino 60'; Galván 75'	Stadium: Estadio Gregorio "Tepa" Gómez; Attendance: 200; Referee: Erick González Miranda

31 January 2023	Tigres Yautepec	1–2	Alebrijes de Oaxaca "B"	Yautepec, Morelos
18:00 CST (UTC−6)	Reyes 49'	Report	Manzanares 22'; Choreño 77'	Stadium: Centro Deportivo Yautepec; Attendance: 200; Referee: Mauricio Roque Trejo

1 February 2023	Deportiva Venados "B"	1–3	Inter Playa del Carmen	Tamanché, Yucatán
15:00 CST (UTC−6)	Maya 84'	Report	González 40'; Montano 83', 90'	Stadium: Estadio Alonso Diego Molina; Attendance: 100; Referee: Jaime Orlando Montes Santos

1 February 2023	Atlético Chavinda	4–0	Zitácuaro	Chavinda, Michoacán
16:00 CST (UTC−6)	Negrete 19'; Lugo 25'; Vega 61'; Cortés 82'	Report		Stadium: Club Campestre Chavinda; Attendance: 200; Referee: Rosario Guadalupe Cárdenas Morales

1 February 2023	Diablos Tesistán	0–1	Chihuahua "B"	Zapopan, Jalisco
16:00 CST (UTC−6)		Report	Valenzuela 61'	Stadium: Club Diablos Tesistán; Attendance: 300; Referee: Omar Alejandro Ortega García

1 February 2023	Poza Rica	2–1	Montañeses	Poza Rica, Veracruz
17:00 CST (UTC−6)	González 31'; Cruz 61'	Report	Peña 74'	Stadium: Estadio Heriberto Jara Corona; Referee: Juan Jesús Selvera Parada

1 February 2023	Calor	1–0	Saltillo	Monclova, Coahuila
20:00 CST (UTC−6)	Gámez 26'	Report		Stadium: Ciudad Deportiva Nora Leticia Rocha; Attendance: 100; Referee: Irvin Aldair Acosta Urbina

=== Quarter–finals ===
Team 1	Score	Team 2
Alebrijes de Oaxaca "B"	0–0 (4–5)	Inter Playa del Carmen
Poza Rica	1–0	Pachuca "B"
Tepatitlán "B"	(p.) 1–1 (3–1)	Atlético Chavinda
Chihuahua "B"	0–0 (1–3) (p.)	Calor

Matches

15 February 2023	Tepatitlán "B"	1–1 (3–1 p)	Atlético Chavinda	Tepatitlán, Jalisco
17:00 CST (UTC−6)	De la Torre 8'	Report	Cortés 2'	Stadium: Estadio Gregorio "Tepa" Gómez; Attendance: 250; Referee: Oscar Javier Ramírez Flores

15 February 2023	Chihuahua "B"	0–0 (1–3 p)	Calor	Chihuahua City, Chihuahua
20:00 CST (UTC−6)		Report		Stadium: Estadio Olímpico Universitario José Reyes Baeza; Attendance: 1,200; Referee: Jorge Alfonso Resendiz Espinoza

21 February 2023	Poza Rica	1–0	Pachuca "B"	Poza Rica, Veracruz
15:00 CST (UTC−6)	Peña 4'	Report		Stadium: Estadio Heriberto Jara Corona; Attendance: 4,000; Referee: Juan Jesús Selvera Parada

21 February 2023	Alebrijes de Oaxaca "B"	0–0 (4–5 p)	Inter Playa del Carmen	Oaxaca City, Oaxaca
17:00 CST (UTC−6)		Report		Stadium: Estadio Tecnológico de Oaxaca; Attendance: 100; Referee: Benjamín Hernández Rodríguez

=== Semi–finals ===
Team 1	Score	Team 2
Poza Rica	1–4	Inter Playa del Carmen
Tepatitlán "B"	0–1	Calor

Matches

28 February 2023	Poza Rica	1–4	Inter Playa del Carmen	Poza Rica, Veracruz
17:00 CST (UTC−6)	Trejo 88'	Report	Valanta 21'; González 55', 74'; Rodríguez 85'	Stadium: Estadio Heriberto Jara Corona; Attendance: 4,300; Referee: Benjamín Hernández Rodríguez

1 March 2023	Tepatitlán "B"	0–1	Calor	Tepatitlán, Jalisco
17:00 CST (UTC−6)		Report	Díaz 20'	Stadium: Estadio Gregorio "Tepa" Gómez; Attendance: 300; Referee: Héctor Emilio Contreras Sotelo

=== Final ===
Team 1	Score	Team 2
Calor	0–2	Inter Playa del Carmen

13 March 2023	Calor	0–2	Inter Playa del Carmen	Monclova, Coahuila
19:30 CST (UTC−6)		Report	Hernández 50'; Cruz 56'	Stadium: Ciudad Deportiva Nora Leticia Rocha; Attendance: 2,500; Referee: Julián Alejandro Duarte Peña

2023 winners
Inter Playa del Carmen
1st title

== See also ==
- 2022–23 Serie A de México season
- 2022–23 Serie B de México season
- 2022–23 Liga TDP season
