= Humberto Martínez =

Mexican footballer (born 1980)

Personal information
- Full name: Humberto Martínez Vega
- Date of birth: 20 October 1980 (age 46)
- Place of birth: Guadalajara, Jalisco, Mexico
- Height: 1.83 m (6 ft 0 in)
- Position: Goalkeeper

Team information
- Current team: Calor (head coach)

Senior career*
Years	Team	Apps	(Gls)
2003–2010	Chiapas	3	(0)
2008–2010	→ Irapuato (loan)	30	(0)
2010–2016	UAT	54	(0)
2011	→ Tijuana (loan)	0	(0)

Managerial career
- 2016: UAT (assistant)
- 2019: Tuxtla (assistant)
- 2019: U. de G. (assistant)
- 2020–2022: Chapulineros de Oaxaca (assistant)
- 2023: Alebrijes UABJO
- 2023: Orgullo Reynosa
- 2026–: Calor
- * Club domestic league appearances and goals as of 15:35, 2 December 2025 (UTC)

Humberto Martínez Vega (born October 20, 1980) is a former professional Mexican footballer who last played for UAT.
