= Armando León =

Mexican footballer (born 2000)

Personal information
- Full name: Armando León Reséndez
- Date of birth: 18 January 2000 (age 26)
- Place of birth: Ensenada, Baja California, Mexico
- Height: 1.89 m (6 ft 2 in)
- Position: Forward

Team information
- Current team: NK Osijek
- Number: 79

Youth career
- 2015–2018: Pachuca
- 2016: Universidad del Fútbol
- 2018–2019: Zacatecas
- 2019–2020: León

Senior career*
Years	Team	Apps	(Gls)
2020–2024	León	8	(1)
2022–2023	→ Oaxaca (loan)	20	(2)
2022–2023	→ Oaxaca Premier (loan)	13	(8)
2024–2026	Rànger's	46	(29)
2025	→ FC Santa Coloma (loan)	0	(0)
2026–	Osijek	7	(5)
- * Club domestic league appearances and goals as of 12 September 2026

Armando León Reséndez (born 18 January 2000) is a Mexican professional footballer who plays as a forward for Croatian Football League club NK Osijek.

== Club career ==
Born in Ensenada, Baja California, León came through the youth ranks at Pachuca and later made his professional debut with Club León on March 8, 2020, in league match against Juárez.

A pivotal moment came in 2024 when he joined Rànger's in Andorra. His impressive goalscoring form quickly established him as a key attacking player, earning him a move to NK Osijek in Croatia during the summer of 2026.

== International career ==
He was one of the 28 players who were called up with the Mexico national team on November 2026 by head coach Rafael Márquez, for the 2026–27 CONCACAF Nations League quarter-finals matches against Jamaica on 14 and 17 November 2026, respectively.

== Career statistics ==
=== Club ===
As of 25 July 2026

Club	Season	League			Cup		Continental		Other		Total	
Club	Season	Division	Apps	Goals	Apps	Goals	Apps	Goals	Apps	Goals	Apps	Goals
León	2019–20	Liga MX	2	1	—		—		—		2	1
León	2020–21	Liga MX	5	0	—		—		—		5	0
León	2021–22	Liga MX	1	0	—		1 (Note: Appearance in CONCACAF Champions League)	0	—		2	0
León	Total		8	1	—		1	0	—		9	1
Oaxaca (loan)	2022–23	Liga de Expansión MX	20	2	—		—		—		20	2
Oaxaca Premier (loan)	2022–23	Serie B de México	13	8	—		—		—		13	8
Rànger's	2023–24	Primera Divisió	2	1	—		—		—		2	1
Rànger's	2024–25	Primera Divisió	26	19	—		—		—		26	19
Rànger's	2025–26	Primera Divisió	18	9	—		—		—		18	9
Rànger's	Total		46	29	—		—		—		46	29
FC Santa Coloma (loan)	2025–26	Primera Divisió	—		—		4 (Note: Appearances in UEFA Conference League qualifiers)	1	—		4	1
Career total			87	40	0	0	5	1	0	0	92	41

== Honours ==
León

- Liga MX: Guardianes 2020
- Leagues Cup: 2021

Alebrijes de Oaxaca Premier

- Serie B de México: Clausura 2023
