= Óscar Rojas (footballer, born 1981) =

Mexican footballer (born 1981)

Personal information
- Full name: Óscar Adrián Rojas Castellón
- Date of birth: August 2, 1981 (age 45)
- Place of birth: Mexico City, Mexico
- Height: 1.72 m (5 ft 7 1/2 in)
- Position: Right-back

Team information
- Current team: Oaxaca (assistant)

Senior career*
Years	Team	Apps	(Gls)
2001–2012	América	259	(9)
2002–2004	→ San Luis (loan)	68	(2)
2012–2013	→ Pachuca (loan)	30	(0)
2013–2018	Puebla	129	(0)
2018–2019	BUAP	0	(0)
Total		486	(11)

International career
2005–2010	Mexico	18	(1)

Managerial career
- 2022: Atlético Angelópolis
- 2023: Tlaxcala (assistant)
- 2025: Zacatepec (assistant)
- 2026–: Oaxaca (assistant)
Medal record
Representing Mexico
Men's Football
Central American and Caribbean Games
Silver medal – second place	2002 San Salvador	Team competition
- * Club domestic league appearances and goals

Óscar Adrián Rojas Castillón (born 2 August 1981) is a Mexican former professional footballer who played as a right-back.

== Club career ==
Rojas was trained in América's youth system and made his debut in the Invierno 2001 season against Celaya. Rojas was part of the 2002 América team that won the championship, although Rojas only played two games. After 2 seasons of little activity with América, he was transferred to San Luis where he became an instant starter. Rojas played 4 seasons with San Luis until San Luis was relegated. Rojas played 68 out of the 76 games that San Luis played in the Primera División (First Division). Rojas returned to América for the Apertura 2004 season. He won his second championship with América during the Clausura 2005.

== Career statistics ==
=== International goals ===
No.	Date	Venue	Opponent	Score	Result	Competition	Ref.
1.	June 10, 2009	Estadio Azteca, Mexico City, Mexico	Trinidad and Tobago	2–1	2–1	2010 FIFA World Cup qualification	

== Honours ==
América

- Mexican Primera División: Verano 2002, Clausura 2005
- Campeón de Campeones: 2005
- CONCACAF Champions' Cup: 2006
- CONCACAF Giants Cup: 2001

Puebla

- Copa MX: Clausura 2015

Mexico

- Central American and Caribbean Games: Silver Medal 2002
