= Chilangos F.C. =

- Full name: Chilangos Fútbol Club
- Nickname(s): Chilangos (Inhabitants of Mexico City)
- Founded: July 2018; 7 years ago
- Dissolved: June 2024; 1 year ago
- Ground: Estadio Jesús Martínez "Palillo"; Mexico City, Mexico
- Capacity: 6,000
- Owner: Raif Shahin Ishac
- Chairman: Raif Shahin Ishac
- Manager: Héctor Noriega
- League: Liga Premier – Serie B
- 2023–24: 9th
Home colours	Away colours

Chilangos F.C. was a football club that played in the Liga Premier – Serie B. It was based in Benito Juárez, Mexico City, Mexico.

== History ==
The team was founded in 2018 as part of a social integration program of the Benito Juárez City Council, one of the municipalities of Mexico City, since its first season the club was registered in the Liga TDP.

Since its foundation, the team has always qualified for the promotion play-off round of the Liga TDP, having its best performance in the 2020–21 season when they reached the quarterfinal round.

On June 30, 2023, the team entered the Liga Premier – Serie B through an expansion franchise to increase the number of teams participating in that league. After the league change, the team was relocated to Estadio Jesús Martínez "Palillo", although, the team tried to play at the Estadio Ciudad de los Deportes located in its original district, the request was rejected so it had to move to that stadium located in another area of the city.

The team only played one tournament in the Liga Premier, since for the 2024–25 season the board put the project on hiatus arguing financial problems, however, some sources argued that the project was paralyzed because it was part of the political platform of Santiago Taboada, an opposition candidate for the Mexico City government who participated in the founding of the club in 2019 and who lost the 2024 elections. Chilangos F.C. was not reactivated for the 2025–26 season and was officially dissolved in accordance with the regulations.
