= Saúl Ramírez =

Mexican footballer (born 1998)

Personal information
- Full name: José Saúl Ramírez Briceño
- Date of birth: 29 September 1998 (age 28)
- Place of birth: Mérida, Yucatán, Mexico
- Height: 1.81 m (5 ft 11 1/2 in)
- Position: Forward

Team information
- Current team: Durango
- Number: 9

Youth career
- 2014–2015: Itzaes
- 2015–2016: Venados
- 2018–2019: → UNAM (loan)

Senior career*
Years	Team	Apps	(Gls)
2016–2021	Venados	31	(0)
2018–2019	→ UNAM Premier (loan)	33	(3)
2022	Coras	0	(0)
2022–2023	T'HÓ Mayas	16	(12)
2023–2026	Real Apodaca	81	(18)
2026–	Durango	0	(0)
- * Club domestic league appearances and goals as of 25 July 2026

José Saúl Ramírez Briceño (born 29 September 1998) is a Mexican professional footballer who plays as a forward for Liga de Expansión MX club Durango.
