= Deportivo Dongu F.C. =

Mexican football club

Dongu
- Full name: Deportivo Dongu Fútbol Club
- Nickname(s): Los Toros (The Bulls)
- Founded: 29 May 2019; 6 years ago
- Dissolved: June 2024; 1 year ago
- Ground: Estadio Los Pinos, Cuautitlán, State of Mexico, Mexico
- Capacity: 5,000
- Owner: José Luis Gutierrez Sánchez
- Chairman: José Luis Gutierrez Sánchez
- League: Liga Premier - Serie B
- 2023–24: 14th
Home colours	Away colours

The Deportivo Dongu Fútbol Club, commonly known as Dongu, was a Mexican football club based in Cuautitlán. The club was founded in 2015 as Deportivo Gladiadores Fútbol Club, and played in the Serie B of Liga Premier.

== History ==
In 2019, Deportivo Gladiadores was dissolved and the club was refounded as Deportivo Dongu, but the club kept the squad and coaching staff from Gladiadores.

In 2020 the team was invited to the Liga Premier – Serie A due to the absence of teams caused by the COVID-19 pandemic. In 2021 the team remained in Serie A although Serie B was restored, so the club improved its sporting and financial situation.

In the Clausura 2023 Tournament, the team managed to qualify for the final phase for the first time in its history, being eliminated in the quarterfinals by Chihuahua F.C.

For the 2023–24 season, the club's board of directors decided to register the team in the Liga Premier – Serie B without knowing the reasons that led to the change. The next year the team requested a hiatus for the 2024–25 season. Finally, Dongu was not reactivated for the 2025–26 season and was officially dissolved in accordance with the league regulations.
