= Hacienda Chichí de los Lagos =

- Private Property / Tourist destination
- Location in Mexico
- Coordinates: 20°40′52″N 89°15′15″W
- Country: Mexico
- Mexican States: Yucatán
- Municipalities: Homún Municipality
- Time zone: UTC−6 (CST)
  - Summer (DST): UTC−5 (CDT)
- Postal code: 97580
- Area code: 988

Hacienda Chichí de los Lagos is located in the Homún Municipality in the state of Yucatán in southeastern Mexico. It is one of the properties that arose during the nineteenth century henequen boom.

== Toponymy ==
The name (Chichí de los Lagos) is a combination of Maya and Spanish terms. "Chichi" is a word from the Mayan language meaning grandmother and "lagos" is a Spanish word meaning lakes. The name refers to the Yalahau Lagoon and two other small bodies of water located near the hacienda.

== How to get there ==
Take highway 180 heading east out of Mérida toward Valladolid. At approximately 36 km turn south toward Tahmek on Calle 20. Take Calle 20 through Hocaba and continue south into Homún. Near the center of Homún, turn east onto Calle 19. Proceed on Calle 19 to Calle 8 and turn south again. Within 7 km is Hacienda Chichí de los Lagos.

== History ==
The hacienda was built in 1765 by the orders of the Spanish governor of Yucatán. During the henequen boom, the property was owned by Enrique and Elías Espinosa who issued hacienda tokens to their workers.

== Architecture ==
There are two main buildings remaining on the site. One is the foreman's house which still has the fireplace chimney standing and a windmill, which pumped water to irrigate the gardens. The main house is of the colonial style and has stone arches, balconies and a stone portico around the main entrance.

There is a mural which is preserved in the chapel. A traditional Mayan thatched house was built about 50 meters from the wall to install artisans' booths. The estate is being renovated to serve as a tourist destination.

== Demographics ==
All of the henequen plantations ceased to exist as autonomous communities with the agrarian land reform implemented by President Lazaro Cardenas in 1937. His decree turned the haciendas into collective ejidos, leaving only 150 hectares to the former landowners for use as private property. Figures before 1937 indicate populations living on the farm. After 1937, figures indicate those living in the community, as the remaining Hacienda Chichí de los Lagos houses only the owner's immediate family.

According to the 2005 census conducted by the INEGI, the population of the city was 0 inhabitants.

Population of Chichí de los Lagos by year
Year	1900	1910	1921	1930	1940	1950	1960	1970	1980	1990	1995	2000	2005
Population	130	116	148	189	161	162	195	137	32	0	?	?	0

== Bibliography ==
- Bracamonte, P and Solís, R., Los espacios de autonomía maya, Ed. UADY, Mérida, 1997.
- Gobierno del Estado de Yucatán, "Los municipios de Yucatán", 1988.
- Kurjack, Edward y Silvia Garza, Atlas arqueológico del Estado de Yucatán, Ed. INAH, 1980.
- Patch, Robert, La formación de las estancias y haciendas en Yucatán durante la colonia, Ed. UADY, 1976.
- Peón Ancona, J. F., "Las antiguas haciendas de Yucatán", en Diario de Yucatán, Mérida, 1971.
