= Huracanes Izcalli F.C. =

Mexican football club

- Full name: Huracanes Izcalli Fútbol Club
- Nickname: Los Huracanes (The Hurricanes)
- Founded: May 2021; 5 years ago
- Ground: Estadio Momoxco; Milpa Alta, Mexico City
- Capacity: 3,500
- Owner: Eduardo Terroba
- Chairman: Eduardo Terroba
- Manager: Arturo Viche
- League: Liga Premier (Premier B)
- 2025–26: Liga Premier (Serie B); Regular phase: 10th Final phase: Did not qualify
Home colours	Away colours

Huracanes Izcalli Fútbol Club is a Mexican football club based in Milpa Alta, Mexico City. The club was founded in 2021, and currently plays in the Premier B, the bottom branch of the Liga Premier de México, the third level division of Mexican football.

== History ==
The team was founded in May 2021 in Cuautitlán, State of Mexico and was entered into the Liga Premier – Serie B on July 30, 2021. On September 18, the team played its first official match, in this game it was defeated by Ciervos F.C. with a score of 1-0.

The team managed to qualify for the final phase for the first time in the Clausura 2022, after it was relocated to Milpa Alta, Mexico City, being eliminated in the Semifinals by Alebrijes de Oaxaca. In the Clausura 2023 the team qualified for the league again, although they were eliminated in the reclassification by Pioneros de Cancún.

== Stadium ==
The Estadio Momoxco is a stadium in San Pedro Actopan, Milpa Alta, Mexico City. It is primarily used for soccer. It holds 3,500 spectators.

== Players ==
=== Current squad ===
As of 11 September 2026

Note: Flags indicate national team as defined under FIFA eligibility rules; some limited exceptions apply. Players may hold more than one non-FIFA nationality.

No.	Pos.	Nation	Player
1	GK	MEX	Richy Domínguez
2	DF	MEX	Alan Viurquez
3	DF	MEX	Emmanuel Saldaña
4	DF	MEX	Arath González
5	DF	MEX	Eduardo Olmos
6	MF	MEX	Lisandro Sánchez
7	MF	MEX	Alejandro Ramírez
8	MF	MEX	Joshua Bello
9	MF	MEX	Ángel Vásquez
10	FW	MEX	Diego Pérez
11	FW	MEX	Jesús Argandona
12	FW	MEX	Eder Martínez
13	GK	MEX	Leobardo Tapia
14	MF	MEX	Edgar Serna
15	MF	MEX	Antuan Ortiz

No.	Pos.	Nation	Player
16	DF	MEX	Sergio García
17	MF	MEX	Rafael Pérez
18	MF	MEX	Brayan Vargas
19	DF	MEX	César Sierra
20	DF	MEX	Diego Paredes
21	DF	MEX	Matías Muciño
22	MF	MEX	Xavier Pérez
23	GK	MEX	Carlos Machorro
24	MF	MEX	Efrén Salas
25	DF	MEX	Diego Baños
26	MF	MEX	Javier Martínez
27	MF	MEX	Alan Blanco
28	MF	MEX	Alexis García
29	MF	MEX	Pavel Sandoval

== Reserves ==
=== Balam F.C. – Huracanes Izcalli TDP ===
Reserve team that plays in the Liga TDP, the fourth level of Mexican football.
