= David Patiño =

Mexican footballer and manager (born 1967)

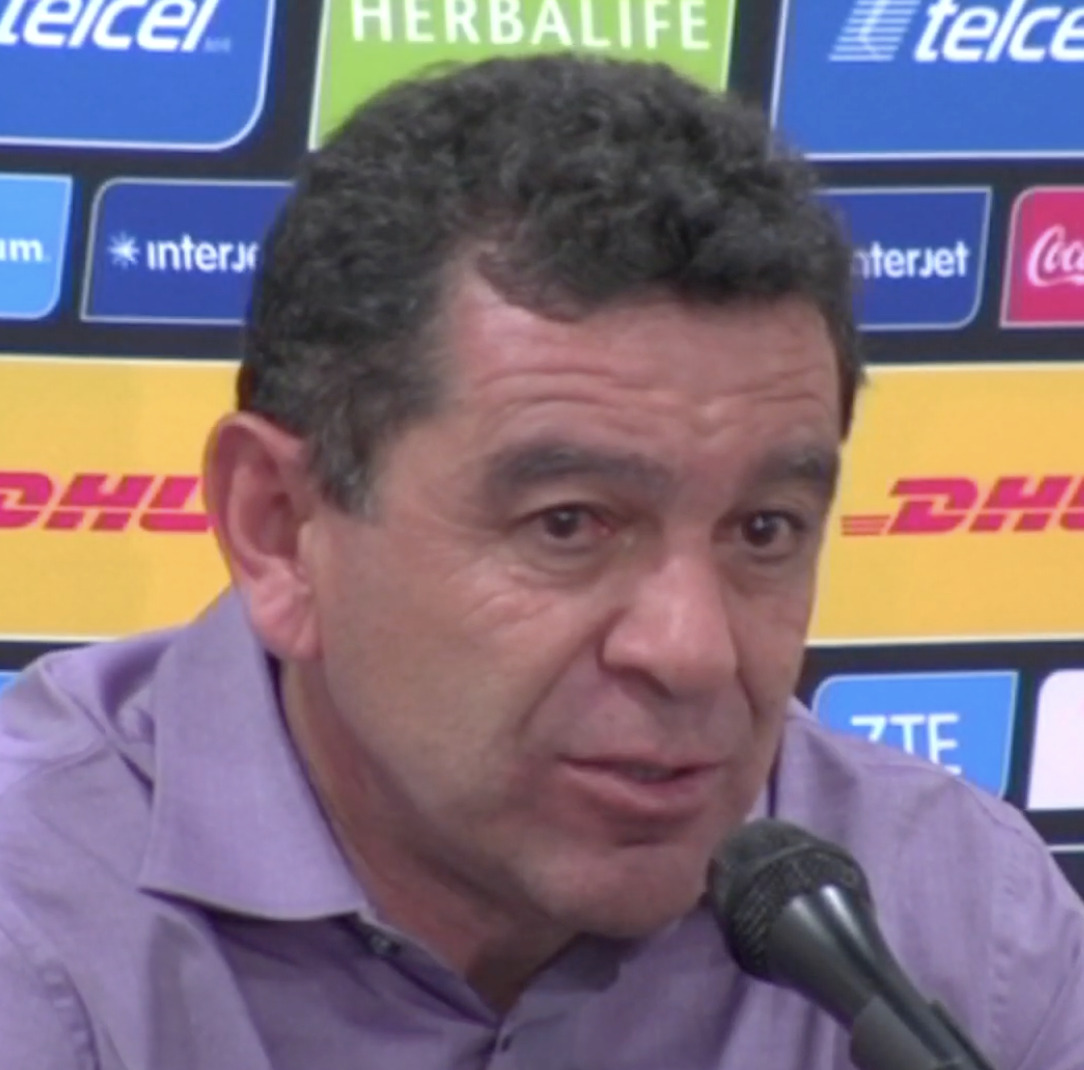
- Patiño 2019

Personal information
- Full name: David Patiño Calvo
- Date of birth: 6 September 1967 (age 59)
- Place of birth: Mexico City, Mexico
- Height: 1.73 m (5 ft 8 in)
- Position: Forward

Senior career*
| Years | Team | Apps | (Gls) |
| 1985–1993 | Pumas UNAM | 176 | (44) |
| 1993–1997 | Monterrey | 104 | (23) |
| 1997 | Colorado Rapids | 23 | (5) |
| 1997–1998 | Monterrey | 12 | (1) |
| 1998–2000 | Pachuca | 29 | (3) |
| 2000–2001 | Toros Neza | 10 | (0) |

International career
| 1993–1996 | Mexico | 28 | (4) |

Managerial career
- 2007: Morelia (Assistant)
- 2007–2008: Morelia
- 2008–2010: Mérida
- 2011–2012: Atlante UTN / Toros Neza
- 2012: Veracruz
- 2013: Pumas Morelos
- 2013–2016: Pumas UNAM (reserves)
- 2016–2017: Pumas UNAM (Assistant)
- 2017: Pumas UNAM (Interim)
- 2017–2019: Pumas UNAM
- 2020: Sinaloa
- 2021: Herediano
- 2022–2023: T'hó Mayas
- 2023–2024: Mexico U23 (Assistant)
- 2025: Victoria
- 2025–2026: Monterrey (women) (Assistant)
Medal record
Representing Mexico
| Runner-up | Copa America | 1993 |
- * Club domestic league appearances and goals

David Patiño Calvo (born 6 September 1967) is a Mexican former professional footballer and manager. He obtained a total number of 28 caps for the Mexico national football team between 1993 and 1996, and was a squad member at the 1993 Copa América. He made his debut on 10 February 1993.

== Career ==
Born in Mexico City, Patiño played professional football for five clubs during his career. He played for Pumas UNAM from 1986 to 1993, where he would win the 1990–91 Mexican Primera División title and the 1989 CONCACAF Champions' Cup. He also won a Mexican Primera División title with C.F. Pachuca in 1999. In 1997, he played for the Colorado Rapids of Major League Soccer, where he helped the club reach the 1997 MLS Cup.

After he retired from playing, Patiño became a football coach. He was appointed manager of Mexican Primera División side Monarcas Morelia in 2007, and has managed several lower division clubs, including Santos Laguna B, Morelia B, Mérida and Neza. He signed a one-year deal to manage Veracruz in May 2012. However, he was fired during the Apertura 2012 tournament, and was appointed manager of Pumas Morelos in December 2012. He is now coach for the pumas U.N.A.M 1st division team.

== Managerial Statistics ==
=== Managerial Statistics ===
As of 3 December 2018 (Note: Includes matches from Liga MX, Copa MX, CONCACAF Champions League)

| Team | Nat | From | To | Record | | | | | | | |
| Team | Nat | From | To | G | W | D | L | GF | GA | GD | Win % |
|---|---|---|---|---|---|---|---|---|---|---|---|
| Pumas UNAM | (Mexico) | October 3, 2017 | January 27, 2019 | 61 | 25 | 19 | 17 | 99 | 85 | +14 | 40.98 |
| Total | | | | 61 | 25 | 19 | 17 | 99 | 85 | +14 | 40.98 |

== International goals ==
| No. | Date | Venue | Opponent | Score | Result | Competition | Ref. |
|---|---|---|---|---|---|---|---|
| 1. | June 20, 1993 | Estadio George Capwell, Guayaquil, Ecuador | Argentina | 1–1 | Draw | 1993 Copa América | |
| 2. | June 27, 1993 | Estadio Olímpico Atahualpa, Quito, Ecuador | Peru | 4–2 | Win | 1993 Copa América | |
| 3. | October 6, 1993 | Los Angeles Memorial Coliseum, Los Angeles, United States | South Africa | 4–0 | Win | Friendly | |
| 4. | May 18, 1996 | Soldier Field, Chicago, United States | Slovakia | 5–2 | Win | Friendly | |

== Honours ==
=== Player ===
Pumas UNAM

- Mexican Primera División: 1990–91
- CONCACAF Champions' Cup: 1989

Pachuca

- Mexican Primera División: Invierno 1999

=== Manager ===
Mérida

- Primera División A: Clausura 2009
