= Sotuta Municipality =

Municipality in the Mexican state of Yucatán

Sotuta
- Municipality
- Municipal location in Yucatán

- Location in Mexico
- Coordinates: 20°35′45″N 89°00′22″W
- Country: Mexico
- State: Yucatán

Government
  - Type: 2012–2015
  - Municipal President: Geny Otilia Blanco Gómez

Area
  - Total: 613.15 km^{2} (236.74 sq mi)
- Elevation: 21 m (69 ft)

Population (2010)
  - Total: 8,449
- Time zone: UTC-6 (Central Standard Time)
- INEGI Code: 069
- Major Airport: Merida (Manuel Crescencio Rejón) International Airport
- IATA Code: MID
- ICAO Code: MMMD

Sotuta Municipality (In the Yucatec Maya Language: “turning water” is a municipality in the Mexican state of Yucatán containing 613.15 square kilometres (236.74 sq mi) of land and located roughly 98 kilometres (61 mi) southeast of the city of Mérida.

== History ==
During pre-Hispanic times, the town existed and served under chieftainship of Cocom. Sotuta means "swirling waters" and is said to be synonymous with Nach Cocom who led the Maya opposition to the Spanish conquistadors. Nach did not like to work with white colonialist and in 1535 he had slayed the heads of a group of Xiu nobles which ultimately caused his own downfall. In 1542 he had recorded victory over the Montejos at the battle at Tiho and came back to Sotuta but the Spanish army captured the territory within the year. Nach had then agreed to a truce. He again ventured to fight the Spaniards in 1546 but faced defeat and accepted a truce. His baptized name was Juan Cocom when he converted to Christianity. However, in 1562 when two young girls were crucified in the church he was incarcerated and deprived of all his benefits and his brother who was questioned also committed suicide. Following this incident, the friars faced the ire of the local people and as a result the clergy was made secular and the Franciscan control of the mission was annulled.

After the conquest the area became part of the encomienda system. The first known encomenderos date from 1549 and were Gonzalo Méndez and Juan Magaña. By 1607, the estate had passed to Gonzalo Magaña and Diego de Magaña en 1607 and by 1652 acting encomenderos were Francisco de Magaña and Alfonso Hernández.

Yucatán declared its independence from the Spanish Crown in 1821 and in 1825, the area was assigned to the Beneficios Bajos region with its headquarters in Sotuta.

== Governance ==
The municipal president is elected for a three-year term. The town council has seven councilpersons, who serve as Secretary and councilors of health; parks and gardens; sports, public lighting, roads and markets, and cemeteries.

The Municipal Council administers the business of the municipality. It is responsible for budgeting and expenditures and producing all required reports for all branches of the municipal administration. Annually it determines educational standards for schools.

The Police Commissioners ensure public order and safety. They are tasked with enforcing regulations, distributing materials and administering rulings of general compliance issued by the council.

== Communities ==
The head of the municipality is Sotuta, Yucatán. The other populated areas include Chilo, Pepén, San Isidro, San Martin, San Pedro, Tabí, Tibolón, Timul, Tzoyoc, and Zavala. The significant populations are shown below:

Community	Population
Entire Municipality (2010)	8,449
Sotuta	5320 in 2005
Tabí	694 in 2005
Tibolón	1544 in 2005
Zavala	506 in 2005

== Local festivals ==
Every year from the 4 to 8 September a celebration is held in honor of the Virgin of the Nativity. A festival also occurs annually from 3 to 12 December to celebrate Our Lady of Guadalupe and on 23 December, San Ildefonso is recognized.

== Tourist attractions ==
- Church of St. Peter the Apostle built in the 17th century
- Chapel of Santa Cruz built in the 18th century
- Palace of Nachi-Cocom

An earlier Franciscan mission was subsumed in a big open hall of the large church built in the 17th century. Its nave is long and has buttresses on both its internal and external sides. The facade on the west side of the church has multilevel belfry towers founded on a broad plinth. It has a pediment which is baroque in design and has embedded with it at the center the "episcopal coat of arms". The nave has four elegantly designed retablos dated from the period 1550 to 1739. Renovations undertaken in 2002 have provided features of Renaissance and baroque architecture. The plain altar has carvings of St. Anne and St. Joachim, parents of St. Mary. The pediment above the altar has a carving of Jesus when young, along with that of St. Joseph. There is retablo of the Trinity with intricate details which is a "twisted Solomonic columns and capitals in the form of human heads". The retablos of Santa Cruz, which is simple, has engravings of gilded floral designs. The images of St. Joseph and St. John are very well crafted which represent late colonial architecture.

There is cemetery to the south of the church covered with bushes. It has gateway of Moorish design and its chapel dated to 18th century is in ruins. On the eastern part of the plaza, opposite to the church, there is the Palace of Nachi Cocom. This is said to be cuartel barracks dated to 18th century that was built over a hermitage chapel which was also a replacement of a mound of a Maya temple.

There is tree to the south of the church where a monument has been erected in honour of Nach Cocom. It is erected on a base surrounded by pillars.

== Bibliography ==
- Perry, Richard D.; Perry, Rosalind (2002). Maya Missions: Exploring Colonial Yucatan. Espada├▒a Press. ISBN 978-0-9620811-9-4.
