= Oaxaca Institute of Technology =

Public university in Mexico

- Instituto Tecnológico de Oaxaca
- Original Colors
- Motto: Tecnología Propia e Independencia Económica
- Motto in English: Proprietary Technology and Economic Independence
- Type: public
- Established: April 18th, 1968
- Rector: Juan Cruz Nieto
- Administrative staff: 211
- Students: 2,574 (2000)
- Undergraduates: 2,550 (2000)
- Postgraduates: 24 (2000)
- Location: Oaxaca de Juárez, Oaxaca, Mexico; 17°04′41″N 96°44′40″W
- Colors: Orange, Gray, Black
- Nickname: ITO
- Mascot: Chapulín (Grasshopper)
- Website: itoaxaca.edu.mx itox.mx

B&W variation

The Instituto Tecnológico de Oaxaca (ITO) (English: Oaxaca Institute of Technology) is a public institution of higher education located in Oaxaca de Juárez, Oaxaca, Mexico. It was established in April 1968.

The university offers ten undergraduate degree programs and six graduate level programs. ITO is part of the Directorate General of Higher Education Technology (DGEST) of the Secretariat of Public Education of Mexico.
