= Estadio Hugo Sánchez Márquez =

Stadium in State of Mexico

Coordinates: 19°38′53″N 99°13′30″W

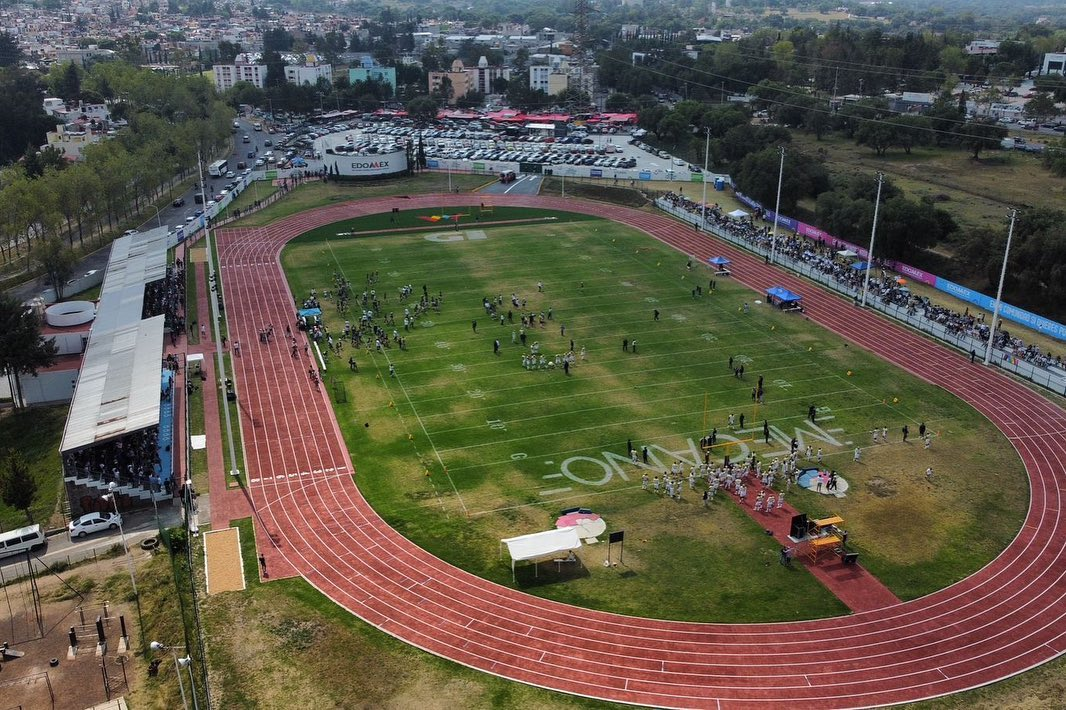
- Aerial view of the stadium in 2022
- Interactive map of Estadio Hugo Sánchez Márquez
- Location: Cuautitlán Izcalli, State of Mexico, Mexico
- Owner: Ayuntamiento de Cuautitlán Izcalli
- Capacity: 3,500
- Surface: Lawn

Construction
- Opened: 4 February 2003
- Renovated: 2021–2022
- Architect: Iván Rodrigo López Cafaggi (2021–2022)

The Estadio Hugo Sánchez Márquez is a multi-use stadium located in Cuautitlán Izcalli, State of Mexico, Mexico. It is currently used mostly for football matches and is the home stadium for Huracanes Izcalli of Liga Premier FMF Serie B and Club Leon of Liga TDP. The stadium has a capacity of 3,500 people.

In June 2026, its facilities were used for testing a drone show organized by a private company from Mexico City, as part of the 2026 FIFA World Cup. Using more than three thousand drones, the show was visible from several neighborhoods in Izcalli. At the beginning of the same month, a similar show was held to promote the American film Masters of the Universe, for which 1,400 drones were used.
