= Atlético Angelópolis =

Mexican football club

- Full name: Club Atlético Angelópolis
- Founded: 5 October 2020; 5 years ago
- Dissolved: June 2023; 2 years ago
- Ground: Unidad Deportiva Mario Vázquez Raña, Puebla City, Puebla, Mexico
- Capacity: 800
- Owner: Víctor Hugo Herrera
- Chairman: Víctor Hugo Herrera
- Manager: Vacant
- League: Liga Premier - Serie B
- Clausura 2023: 9th
Home colours	Away colours

The Club Atlético Angelópolis was a Mexican football club based in Puebla City. The club was founded in 2020, and played in the Serie B of Liga Premier.

== History ==
The team was founded in October 2020 as Atlético Rivadavia, having its field in San Pedro Cholula, a municipality belonging to the Puebla metro area. Originally, the team participated in alternate leagues to those organized by the Mexican Football Federation.

In 2022, the team began procedures to join the FMF; finally, in July the club was accepted into the Liga Premier de México, being placed in Serie B, for which it began to compete in professional soccer in Mexico. The team announced Óscar Rojas as its first manager.

This was the second professional football team in Puebla since the dissolution of Lobos BUAP in the summer of 2019.

During its time in Serie B, the team did not have a good sporting performance, in addition to failing to gain the support of the local public, which is why in June 2023 the board requested a one-year hiatus. In June 2024 Atlético Angelópolis did not return to activity, so it was considered a dissolved club.
