= Homún Municipality =

Municipality in the Mexican state of Yucatán

- Municipality
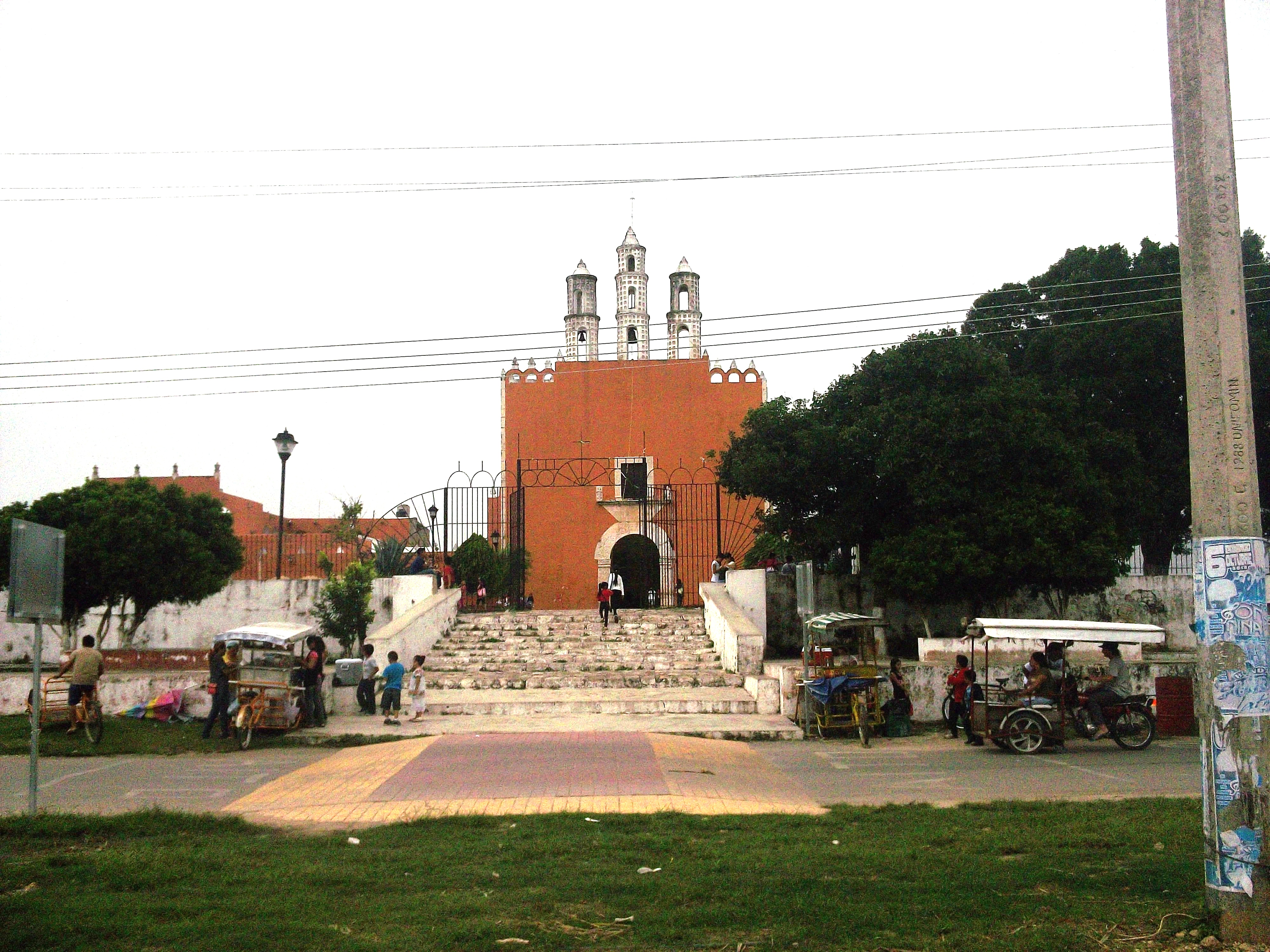
- Church of Homún, Yucatán

- Region 3 Centro #036

- Location of the Municipality in Mexico
- Coordinates: 20°44′19″N 89°17′06″W
- Country: Mexico
- State: Yucatán

Government
  - Type: 2012–2015
  - Municipal President: José Alejandro Pech Pat

Area
  - Total: 192.89 km^{2} (74.48 sq mi)
- Elevation: 6 m (20 ft)

Population (2010)
  - Total: 7,268
- Time zone: UTC-6 (Central Standard Time)
- INEGI Code: 009
- Major Airport: Merida (Manuel Crescencio Rejón) International Airport
- IATA Code: MID
- ICAO Code: MMMD

Homún Municipality (Spanish pronunciation: [xoˈmun], in the Yucatec Maya language: “Five unripened”) is a municipality in the Mexican state of Yucatán containing 192.89 km^{2} of land and located roughly 50 km southeast of the city of Mérida.

== History ==
After the conquest, during the colonial period, the Municipality of Homún was founded as an encomienda first for Pedro Alvarez y Melchor Pacheco in 1549; Juan Vela in 1564; Juan Vela de Aguirre, Catalina de Rua and Santillán Gómez del Castillo in 1579; Pedro de Mézquita in 1629; Cristóbal Gutiérrez Flores, Juan del Castillo y Quiñones and Juan Serrano in 1687; Ana Serrano and Alonso de Aranda y Aguayo in 1710, who had control of 162 Indians; and finally Antonio del Castillo y Carrillo in 1725 who controlled 469 Indians.

In the modern era, in 1825, Homún became part of the Municipality of Sotuta and in 1829 the farm named Sutupil was joined with the municipality. In 1884 the location became a village in its own right.

== Governance ==
The municipal president is elected for a term of three years. The president appoints seven Councilpersons to serve on the board for three year terms, as the Secretary and councilors of street lighting, public works, potable water, market and supply, parks and public gardens, public monuments, and nomenclature.

The Municipal Council administers the business of the municipality. It is responsible for budgeting and expenditures and producing all required reports for all branches of the municipal administration. Annually it determines educational standards for schools.

The Police Commissioners ensure public order and safety. They are tasked with enforcing regulations, distributing materials and administering rulings of general compliance issued by the council.

== Communities ==
The municipality is made up of 8 communities, which are considered of importance Chichi Lagos, Homún, Kanpepén, Kanún, Polabán, San Antonio, San Isidro Ochil and Yalahán. Other minor communities are: Chan Santo, Cho-chich, Culul, Kanka-Chen, Kan Kadzonot, Santa Cruz, Sintunil, and Sipchac.

Community	Population
Entire Municipality (2010)	7,268
Chichi Lagos	0 in 2005
Homún	5826 in 2005
Kampepén	35 in 2005
Kanún	0 in 2005
Polabán	77 in 2005
San Antonio Kolondet	10 in 2005
San Isidro Ochil	937 in 2005
Yalahán	0 in 2005

== Local festivals ==
Every year from the 6 to 14 July a fiesta is held in honor of San Buenaventura.

== Tourist attractions ==
- Cenote Balmil
- Santa Maria Cave & Cenote
- Santa Rosa Cenote
- Tza Ujun Kat Cenote
- Yaxbakaltun Cenote
- Yalahau Lagoon

=== Archeological sites ===
- Kampepen
- Sión
- Yalabau

=== Architectural sites ===
- Cathedral of St. Bonaventure
- Cathedral of St. James
- Hacienda Chichí de los Lagos
- Hacienda Polabán
