= T'HÓ Mayas F.C. =

Mexican football club

- Full name: T'HÓ Mayas Fútbol Club
- Founded: May 2022; 3 years ago
- Dissolved: June 2023; 2 years ago
- Ground: Campo Hipólito Tzab, Homún, Yucatán, Mexico
- Capacity: 600
- Chairman: Carlos Calvo
- Manager: Vacant
- League: Liga Premier - Serie B
- Clausura 2023: 2nd (Runner–up)
- Website: https://thomayas.com/index.html
Home colours	Away colours

The T'HÓ Mayas Fútbol Club was a Mexican football club based in Homún, Yucatán. The club was founded in 2022, and played in the Serie B of Liga Premier.

== History ==
The team was founded in May 2022, although during its first years it competed in amateur leagues. In July 2022, the team began procedures to join the Mexican Football Federation, finally in July the club was accepted into the Liga Premier de México, being placed in Serie B, for which it began to compete in professional soccer in Mexico.

After the presentation, the team announced its first steps as a professional squad. The club introduced David Patiño as its first coach and later unveiled a project to build a soccer stadium and an attached complex, which will be located in Acanceh. However, while these works are carried out, the team will temporarily play in Homún. The board intends to reach Serie A de México in a year and the Liga de Expansión MX in a period of between 3 and 5 years.

During its time in Serie B, the club achieved runners-up in the Clausura 2023. At the end of the season the team requested a year's hiatus to try to improve its sporting and financial infrastructure, however, in the summer of 2024 the team did not resume activity, so it was considered as disbanded by the league.
