= Estadio Momoxco =

Stadium in Mexico City, Mexico

Coordinates: 19°12′55.203″N 99°3′10.531″W

- Interactive map of Estadio Momoxco
- Full name: Centro de Enseñanza de Alto Rendimiento Momoxco
- Location: Milpa Alta, Mexico City
- Owner: Milpa Alta Municipality
- Operator: Comité Deportivo Momoxco
- Capacity: 3,500

Construction
- Opened: 2010

Tenants
- Sporting Canamy (2015–16); Cañoneros Marina/Cañoneros FC (2018–24, 2026–present); Huracanes Izcalli (2025–present)

Estadio Momoxco is a stadium in San Pedro Actopan, Milpa Alta, Mexico City, Mexico. It is primarily used for soccer, and is the home field of the club Cañoneros F.C. It holds 3,500 peoples.

It was opened in April 2010 and is part of a sports complex called Centro de Enseñanza de Alto Rendimiento Momoxco, which in addition to the soccer field includes a running track and a gym.
