= Cañoneros F.C. =

- Full name: Cañoneros Fútbol Club
- Nicknames: La Marina (The Navy); Los Cañoneros (The Gunners)
- Founded: 1 June 2012; 14 years ago
- Ground: Estadio Momoxco, Milpa Alta, Mexico City
- Capacity: 3,500
- Owner: Alfonso Enríquez
- Chairman: Alfonso Enríquez
- Manager: David Zaragoza
- League: Liga Premier (Premier A)
- 2025–26: Liga Premier (Serie A); Regular phase: 11th (Group III); Final phase: Did not qualify
| Home colours | Away colours |

The Cañoneros Fútbol Club, is a Mexican professional football club based in Milpa Alta, Mexico City. The club was founded on 2012, and currently plays in Premier A, the intermediate branch of the Liga Premier de México, the third tier of Mexican football.

== History ==
The team was founded on 1 June 2012 by an agreement between the Mexican Secretariat of the Navy and amateur soccer league, Liga de Fútbol Torneo Central de Reservas. The creation of the team was made with the objective of creating a team to train the talents of the national navy and athletes who emerged in the amateur tournament. Between 2012 and 2020, this club was funded in part by the Mexican government by relying on a Federal Secretariat.

From 2012 to 2018, the team participated in Tercera División de México. The team's greatest success came in the 2017-18 season, when it achieved the second place in the category, after being defeated by Acatlán F.C. in the final series.

The condition as runner-up of the team allowed it to get promotion to the Serie B of the Liga Premier, because its rival did not meet the requirements to participate in this division. Also, the club maintains a reserve team competing in the Tercera División. Before the start of the 2018–19 season the team was renamed Cañoneros Marina.

In the first season in Serie B, the team qualified for the playoffs. In the quarterfinals the team eliminated Mineros de Fresnillo by 6-2 in the aggregate. In semifinals, Marina tied with Atlético Saltillo Soccer, but advanced by his condition of best-seeded team. In the final, the navy defeated Deportivo CAFESSA 3-2 on aggregate, thus winning its first championship in history.

In 2021, the team was renamed Cañoneros F.C. because the Secretariat of the Navy stopped providing financial and institutional support to the club, and therefore was no longer representative of the institution.

On 15 June 2024, the team was relocated from Mexico City to Xalapa, Veracruz because the board received an offer with better conditions to move the team to that city.

On 12 August 2026, the team announced that it would be relocated from Xalapa to Progreso Industrial, State of Mexico. However, the proposed stadium did not pass the league's review, so the team ultimately established its home ground at Estadio Momoxco in Milpa Alta, Mexico City. This marks the team's third relocation in its history and a return to the stadium it occupied between 2018 and 2024.

== Players ==
=== Current squad ===
As of 9 September 2026

Note: Flags indicate national team as defined under FIFA eligibility rules; some limited exceptions apply. Players may hold more than one non-FIFA nationality.

| No. | Pos. | Nation | Player |
|---|---|---|---|
| 1 | GK | MEX | Alan Mendoza |
| 2 | DF | MEX | Benito Cayo |
| 3 | DF | MEX | Roberto Muñiz |
| 4 | DF | MEX | Josué Hernández |
| 5 | DF | MEX | Aldo Sánchez |
| 7 | FW | MEX | Antonio Dávalos |
| 8 | FW | COL | Jimmy Arias |
| 9 | MF | MEX | Alberto Martínez |
| 10 | MF | MEX | Alejandro Rojas |
| 11 | MF | MEX | Pablo Hernández |
| 12 | MF | MEX | Ángel Medina |
| 13 | MF | MEX | Brandon Saldaña |
| 14 | DF | MEX | Carlos Cruz |
| 15 | MF | MEX | Mario Nájera |
| 16 | DF | MEX | Christian Colin |

| No. | Pos. | Nation | Player |
|---|---|---|---|
| 17 | MF | MEX | Diego Martínez |
| 18 | MF | MEX | Bryan Romano |
| 19 | FW | MEX | Saúl Medina |
| 20 | MF | MEX | Julio Hernández |
| 21 | MF | MEX | Felipe Cruz |
| 22 | GK | MEX | Eduardo de la Luz |
| 23 | MF | MEX | David García |
| 24 | DF | MEX | Omar Santos |
| 25 | DF | MEX | Pedro Medina |
| 26 | MF | MEX | José Coutiño |
| 27 | MF | MEX | Ilian Castillo |
| 28 | FW | MEX | Alan Santos |
| 30 | MF | MEX | Raúl Sampayo |
| 31 | GK | MEX | Carlo García |
| 32 | MF | MEX | David Bautista |

=== Reserve teams ===
Nicolás Romero F.C. (Liga TDP)
Reserve team that plays in the Liga TDP, the fourth level of the Mexican league system.

== Honours ==
=== National ===
==== Promotion divisions ====
- Liga Premier Serie B
  - Champions (1): 2018–19
