= Estadio Tecnológico de Oaxaca =

Multi-use stadium in Oaxaca City, Oaxaca, Mexico

Coordinates: 17.0802048°N 96.7465228°W

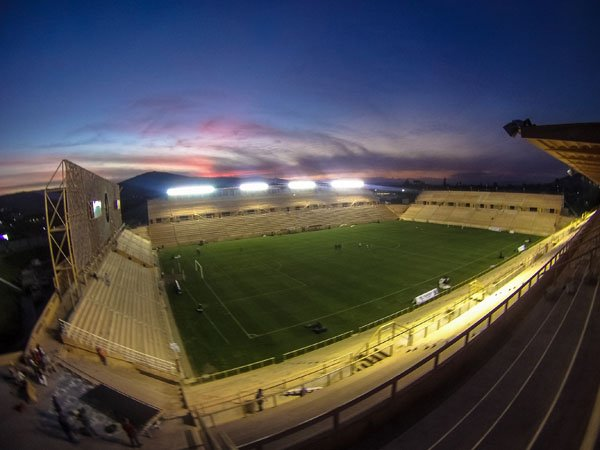
- Interactive map of Estadio Tecnológico de Oaxaca
- Location: Oaxaca City, Oaxaca, Mexico
- Owner: Oaxaca Institute of Technology
- Capacity: 14,598 seats
- Surface: Grass
- Field size: 105 by 68 metres (115 yd × 74 yd)

Construction
- Groundbreaking: March 2013
- Opened: 27 March 2016
- Cost: MXN$335 million
- General contractors: Empresas ICA; Casaflex

Tenants
- Alebrijes de Oaxaca (Liga de Expansión MX) (2016–present); Chapulineros de Oaxaca (Liga Premier) (2016–2018); Dragones de Oaxaca (Liga TDP/Liga Premier) (2020–2021, 2025–present)

The Estadio Tecnológico de Oaxaca is a multi-use stadium in Oaxaca City, Oaxaca, Mexico. It is currently used mostly for football matches and is the home stadium for Alebrijes de Oaxaca. The stadium has a capacity of 16,000 people and also includes 72 luxury boxes.

== History ==
Construction on the new stadium began in March 2013 as part of the 45th anniversary ceremonies of the Oaxaca Institute of Technology (ITO). Delays were incurred during the project when teachers and students of the ITO protested, prompting construction to be halted for 11 months and nearly forcing the Alebrijes to move out of Oaxaca.

The stadium was designed to imitate the ballgame court at Monte Albán. It has a nominal capacity of 14,950 seats installed in order to meet the requirements of the Mexican Football Federation; in the event that Alebrijes are promoted to the Liga MX, the stadium is capable of expansion to 25,000.

The venue was formally inaugurated on March 27, 2016, for a friendly between Alebrijes and Pumas. Governor Gabino Cué Monteagudo performed the ceremonial opening kickoff. The venue replaced the Estadio Benito Juárez as the home ground of the Alebrijes.

A stadium.com survey ranked the new Estadio Tecnológico among the top 20 new stadiums worldwide for 2016.

In July 2016, shortly after the stadium opened, Governor Cué ceded operation of the stadium to the San Román family, which owns the Alebrijes through the Grupo Tecomachalco, free for 20 years; authorities of the technological institute also have demanded that the state government transfer ownership of the facility to them.
