= Estadio Ignacio López Rayón =

Multi-use stadium in Zitácuaro, Mexico

Coordinates: 19°27′9″N 100°17′43″W

The Estadio Ignacio López Rayón is a multi-use stadium in Zitácuaro, Michoacán, Mexico. As of 2025, it is used for football matches and is the home stadium for Deportivo Zitácuaro, who play in Liga Premier de México, the third tier of the Mexican professional football pyramid. It has also served as a neutral-site stadium for teams whose home stadiums do not meet the requirements for a competition. The stadium has a capacity of 10,000 people.
