= Club Calor =

Mexican football club

Calor
- Full name: Club de Fútbol Calor
- Nickname: El Calor (The Heat)
- Founded: 30 August 2001; 25 years ago
- Ground: Estadio Arreola; Chalco, State of Mexico
- Capacity: 3,217
- Owner: Stephen Tolman
- Chairman: Timothy Tolman
- Manager: Ismael Íñiguez
- League: Liga Premier (Premier A)
- 2025–26: Liga Premier (Serie A); Regular phase: 5th (Group II); Final phase: Reclassification
Home colours	Away colours

Club de Fútbol Calor, commonly known as Calor, is a Mexican football club based in Chalco, State of Mexico. The club was founded on August 30, 2001, and plays in the Premier A, the intermediate branch of the Liga Premier de México, the third division level of Mexican football.

== History ==
The team was founded on August 30, 2001 under the name El Calor de San Pedro, it was originally based in San Pedro, Coahuila and participated in the Tercera División de México. The squad was created with the objective of training players from the Mexican-Canadian League, a local competition. In 2012, the team obtained the sub-championship of the Tercera División, losing to Real Cuautitlán, however, their position allowed the team to be promoted to the Segunda División de México.

In August 2012, the team debuted in the Liga de Nuevos Talentos, the second level of the Segunda División, and the team managed to maintain the category without very much problems.

In July 2013, the club was relocated to Gómez Palacio, Durango in order to stay in the category as it could not meet the necessary requirements at its original town, and it was renamed as Calor de Gómez Palacio, the club had as a new field the Unidad Deportiva Francisco Gómez Palacio.

In the Clausura 2017 tournament, the team finished the competition as runner-up, after being defeated by Yamalkán.

In 2018, the team was relocated again to Monclova, Coahuila, being its third change of venue in the history of the team, also, the team was renamed as Club Calor. After the arrival of the club to its new city, the construction of a football stadium was planned.

During the 2020–2021 season, the team requested a one-year hiatus to undergo a financial and sports restructuring, due to the problems caused by the COVID-19 pandemic in the Mexican football sector, in addition to improving their situation to be eligible for a place in the Liga Premier – Serie A.

In the summer of 2021, the team returned to compete, at the end of the Apertura 2021 tournament, Club Calor reached the championship final, where they were defeated by Aguacateros C.D. Uruapan.

In the Apertura 2022, Club Calor won their first official championship by defeating Alebrijes de Oaxaca by 3–2 on the aggregate. In May 2023 the club was promoted to the Liga Premier – Serie A after obtaining the respective license to participate in that league.

In 2024, the team returned to the Serie B due to improvement work on its stadium in Monclova, due to the lack of a stadium in that city, the team tried to establish itself in León, Guanajuato, where they previously had a reserve team, however, the team was involved in an attempted name change by the Unión de Curtidores franchise, and the league did not authorize the relocation, generating a rejection from the fans. Finally, for the 2024–25 season, the team was relocated once more to San Juan de los Lagos, Jalisco.

In June 2025, the team was relocated for the fifth time, this time to Reynosa, Tamaulipas, due to the alliance offer launched by a team from that city, and also to facilitate its return to the Serie A by being a city with better sporting and urban infrastructure. In July 2026, the Club Calor owners announced the team's departure from Reynosa due to a breach of contract by the administration that managed the club in the city.

On July 24, 2026, the club announced the Estadio Olímpico in Oaxtepec, Morelos, as its new home stadium, being its sixth change of venue in the history of the team. However, although the club confirmed its arrival in Oaxtepec, the team never managed to play an official match in that city due to disagreements between the club and the administrative staff of the Mexican Social Security Institute (the stadium's owner); ultimately, the club had to play its home matches at the Estadio Arreola in Chalco, State of Mexico, marking the seventh change of stadium in the history of Calor.

== Honors ==
- Liga Premier de México (Serie B) Champions: 1

Apertura 2022

== Players ==
=== Current squad ===
As of 7 September 2026

Note: Flags indicate national team as defined under FIFA eligibility rules; some limited exceptions apply. Players may hold more than one non-FIFA nationality.

No.	Pos.	Nation	Player
2	DF	MEX	Brandon Zamudio
3	DF	MEX	Pablo de la Rosa
4	DF	MEX	Edgar Ruiz
5	DF	MEX	Emilio Gutiérrez
6	DF	MEX	Andrés Collins
7	MF	MEX	Arturo Arias
8	MF	MEX	Pablo Vizcaya
9	FW	MEX	Fernando García
10	FW	MEX	Bryan Rojo
11	DF	MEX	Miguel Ángel Sánchez
12	GK	MEX	Williams Bravo
13	DF	MEX	Cristian Bernardino
14	MF	USA	Darey Zamora
15	MF	MEX	Carlos Espinosa
16	MF	MEX	Lorenzo Fabela

No.	Pos.	Nation	Player
17	MF	MEX	Isaác Díaz
18	GK	MEX	Gabriel Martínez
19	DF	MEX	Enrique Selvas
20	MF	MEX	Atlaí Maraver
21	FW	MEX	Ryan Olvera
22	DF	MEX	José Ballesteros
23	MF	MEX	Alan Ruiz
24	MF	MEX	Ángel Rodríguez
25	DF	MEX	Jesús Contreras
26	MF	MEX	José Luis Colín
27	FW	MEX	Mauro Sampayo
28	MF	MEX	Diego Ortiz
29	FW	COL	Samuel Cardona
30	MF	MEX	Dominic Sánchez
37	DF	MEX	Pablo Ramírez

== Reserves ==
=== Club Calor TDP ===
Reserve team that plays in the Liga TDP, the fourth level of Mexican football.
