= Club de Ciervos FC =

Mexican football club

Club de Ciervos F.C.
- Full name: Club de Ciervos Fútbol Club
- Nickname: Los Chalcompas (The inhabitants of Chalco)
- Founded: 23 August 2008; 18 years ago
- Ground: Estadio Arreola; Chalco, State of Mexico
- Capacity: 3,217
- Owner: Rodolfo Herrera
- Chairman: Rodolfo Herrera
- Manager: Vacant
- League: Liga Premier (Premier A)
- 2025–26: Liga Premier (Serie A); Regular phase: 13th (Group II); Final phase: Did not qualify
Home colours	Away colours

Club de Ciervos Fútbol Club is a Mexican football club based in Chalco, State of Mexico. The club was founded in 2008, and currently competes in the Premier A, the intermediate branch of the Liga Premier de México, the third level division of Mexican football.

== History ==
The team was founded on August 23, 2008 as Vikingos de Chalco, and from its foundation until 2016, they competed in the Tercera División de México. Before starting the 2016-17 season, the team was invited to the Liga de Nuevos Talentos to cover the abandonment of the Club Picudos de Manzanillo, after it was relocated from Manzanillo, Colima to Chalco, State of Mexico.

In 2017, the team was renamed as Ciervos F.C. In 2018, the name of the team was slightly modified, going to be called Club de Ciervos F.C., in addition, a reserve team was created to compete in the Tercera División.

At the end of the 2020–21 season, the club began a remodeling of its structure due to the very poor sporting results of the institution during the football cycle, for this reason, on May 22, 2021 the club was renamed Chalco F.C., however, because the change was not made official with the Federación Mexicana de Fútbol (FMF), the team continued to compete under the name Club de Ciervos. Finally, after the end of the 2021–22 season, the team did not carry out the name change procedures, so it remained with the original name.

== Players ==
=== Current squad ===
As of 5 September 2026

Note: Flags indicate national team as defined under FIFA eligibility rules; some limited exceptions apply. Players may hold more than one non-FIFA nationality.

No.	Pos.	Nation	Player
1	GK	MEX	Jair Villanueva
2	DF	MEX	Uziel Alarcón
3	DF	MEX	Santiago Rodríguez
5	DF	MEX	José Luis Sixtos
6	MF	MEX	Alan Calzada
8	MF	MEX	Alan Flores
11	MF	MEX	Mario Reyes
12	FW	MEX	Armando Domínguez
13	FW	MEX	Emmanuel Rodríguez
14	MF	MEX	Alexis Macedo
15	DF	MEX	Carlos Gutiérrez
16	MF	MEX	Cristian Perea
17	MF	MEX	Néstor Estrada
18	DF	MEX	Alberto Yáñez
19	DF	MEX	Ángel Fonseca

No.	Pos.	Nation	Player
20	DF	MEX	Andrés Rioja
21	MF	MEX	Christian González
22	DF	MEX	Mateo Favila
23	MF	MEX	Santiago Estrada
24	MF	MEX	Guillermo Martínez
25	MF	MEX	Ruy Velásquez
26	MF	MEX	Marck Soto
27	MF	MEX	Ariel Calzada
28	DF	MEX	Edgar Sánchez
29	MF	MEX	Sergio Favela
30	DF	MEX	Gabriel González
31	MF	MEX	Jesús Alba
32	FW	MEX	Carlos Rodríguez
34	GK	MEX	Adrián Irigoyen

=== Reserve teams ===
CEFAR Azul Iztacalco – Ciervos F.C. (Liga TDP)
Reserve team that plays in the Liga TDP, the fourth level of the Mexican league system.
