= C.D. Avispones de Chilpancingo =

C.D. Avispones de Chilpancingo A.C.
- Full name: Club Deportivo Avispones de Chilpancingo Asociación Civil
- Nickname: Avispones (Hornets)
- Founded: 1988; 38 years ago
- Dissolved: 27 April 2026; 4 months ago
- Ground: Polideportivo Chilpancingo; Chilpancingo, Guerrero, Mexico
- Capacity: 5,000
- Owner: Avispones de Chilpancingo AC
- Chairman: José Andrés Ríos Ortega
- League: Liga Premier (Serie A)
- 2025–26: Regular phase: 9th (Group II); Final phase: Did not qualify
Home colours	Away colours

Club Deportivo Avispones de Chilpancingo Asociación Civil was a Mexican football club that played in the Liga Premier - Serie A of the Segunda División de México, the third division level of Mexican football. It was based in Chilpancingo, Guerrero.

== History ==
The team was founded in 1988 as a representative team from Acapulco, Guerrero, later it became the property of the Government of Guerrero, which decided to relocate the team to Chilpancingo, the state capital. Since its foundation until 2022, the team played in the Tercera División de México.

On September 26, 2014 the team played a game as a visitor in Iguala, Guerrero, after finishing the match, the team was returning to their city when it was attacked in a shootout related to the 2014 Iguala mass kidnapping, the player David Josué García Evangelista was killed on the spot, while twelve other members of the team and coaching staff were badly injured. In November 2014 the team returned to play matches after a month without activity.

In 2019, the team entered an economic crisis after the assassination of its president, so the Chilpancingo City Council and the Government of Guerrero intervened in the club to ensure its continuity.

In the 2021–22 season the team was promoted to the Liga Premier de México – Serie B after defeating Real Ánimas de Sayula in the promotion playoff. The team had previously achieved the regional Tercera División sub-championship where it was defeated by Deportiva Venados.

After two years in the Liga Premier - Serie A, for the 2024–25 season the team was promoted to Serie A, the main branch of this division.

On April 27, 2026, it was announced that the team would begin a relocation process to Acapulco due to the existence of better conditions for the team's growth in the city, although the board announced that it hoped businessmen from Chilpancingo would help maintain a team in the Liga TDP in the city. Finally, on 28 May, the new club named Guerreros del Pacífico F.C. was presented, which meant the end of the original Chilpacingo franchise after 38 years of existence.

== Stadium ==
The team played its home games at the Polideportivo Chilpancingo, the soccer field is known as Estadio David Josué García Evangelista in tribute to the team player killed in Iguala on September 26, 2014. It has a capacity to hold 5,000 spectators.

== Rivalry ==
C.D. Avispones de Chilpancingo had an important rivalry with the Águilas UAGro, team representative of the state's public university, the match was known as the Clásico Guerrerense.

== See also ==
- Football in Mexico
- Tercera División de México
