= Deportivo Zitácuaro =

Mexican football club

- Full name: Club Deportivo de Fútbol Zitácuaro
- Nicknames: Los Potros (The Colts); Los Guayaberos (The Guava producers); Guerreros (Warriors)
- Founded: 1995; 31 years ago
- Ground: Estadio Ignacio López Rayón; Zitácuaro, Michoacán
- Capacity: 10,000
- Owner: Grupo Orihuela
- Chairman: Ignacio Orihuela
- Manager: Mario Alberto Trejo García
- League: Liga Premier (Serie A)
- 2025–26: Regular phase: 11th (Group II); Final phase: Did not qualify
| Home colours | Away colours |

Club Deportivo de Fútbol Zitácuaro, simply known as Deportivo Zitácuaro, is a Mexican professional football club based in Zitácuaro, Michoacán, that plays in the Liga Premier - Serie A, the third level division of Mexican football.

== History ==
The team was formed in 1995, being registered in the Tercera División de México. In its first year the team won the category championship and promotion to the Segunda División de México.

In the summer of 2001, the team was champion of the Segunda División after defeating Cihuatlán. Later, the team got its promotion to the Primera División 'A' de México after defeating Halcones de Querétaro in a promotion play-off. During that time the team was known as Potros Zitácuaro and was owned by Grupo Pegaso, making it a reserve team for Atlante so it had players like Federico Vilar and Luis Gabriel Rey. In 2002, the team was relocated to Mexico City and renamed as Potros DF, this due to administrative issues of the club's owner group.

Later, the team was revived in the Tercera División, in and 2013 the team got its promotion to the Liga de Nuevos Talentos. In 2015, the team was dissolved due to poor sports results. In 2017, the team returned to compete in the Liga Premier - Serie B, and was renamed as Atlético Zitácuaro. However, the team only participated in the 2017–18 season.

In 2019, the team competed again, but from that year it took the name Club Deportivo de Fútbol Zitácuaro, in 2021 the team paused its participation temporarily due to financial problems derived from the COVID-19 pandemic. In 2022, the team returned to compete in the league.

== Players ==
=== Current squad ===
As of January 12, 2026

Note: Flags indicate national team as defined under FIFA eligibility rules; some limited exceptions apply. Players may hold more than one non-FIFA nationality.

| No. | Pos. | Nation | Player |
|---|---|---|---|
| 1 | GK | MEX | Héctor Ordaz |
| 2 | DF | MEX | Víctor Rodríguez |
| 3 | DF | MEX | Alejandro Ávalos |
| 4 | DF | MEX | Alberto Rodríguez |
| 5 | DF | MEX | Édgar Ruiz |
| 6 | MF | MEX | Pablo Vizcaya |
| 7 | MF | MEX | Enrique Díaz |
| 8 | MF | MEX | Irvin Romero |
| 9 | FW | MEX | Rivaldo Godínez |
| 10 | MF | MEX | Diego Espinosa |
| 12 | DF | MEX | Brayan Bahena |
| 14 | MF | MEX | David Jiménez |

| No. | Pos. | Nation | Player |
|---|---|---|---|
| 16 | MF | MEX | Adolfo Álvarez |
| 15 | MF | MEX | Gael Hernández |
| 17 | MF | MEX | Santiago Rosas |
| 18 | DF | MEX | Esteban Games |
| 19 | FW | MEX | Brandon Zamudio |
| 20 | MF | MEX | Moisés Díaz |
| 23 | DF | MEX | Emmanuel Patiño |
| 24 | DF | MEX | Carlos Loza |
| 26 | MF | MEX | Yishay Zúñiga |
| 27 | MF | MEX | Kevin González |
| 31 | GK | MEX | Emanuel Gómez |
| 33 | FW | MEX | Santiago Gómez |

=== Reserve teams ===
Deportivo Lázaro Cárdenas (Liga TDP)
Reserve team that plays in the Tercera División de México, the bottom level of the Mexican league system.
