= Alebrijes de Oaxaca Premier =

Mexican football club

Alebrijes de Oaxaca UABJO
- Full name: Alebrijes de Oaxaca UABJO Fútbol Club
- Nickname: Los Alebrijes (The Alebrijes)
- Founded: July 2013; 13 years ago
- Dissolved: June 15, 2023; 3 years ago
- Ground: Estadio Tecnológico de Oaxaca
- Capacity: 14,598
- Owner: Distribuidora Disur S.A. de C.V.
- Chairman: Juan Carlos Jones
- League: Liga Premier – Serie B
- Clausura 2023: 4th (Champions)
- Website: https://www.alebrijesoaxaca.com/
Home colours	Away colours	Third colours

Alebrijes de Oaxaca UABJO, also and officially named Alebrijes de Oaxaca Fútbol Club Premier, was a Mexican football team based in the city of Oaxaca, state of Oaxaca. They played in the third tier of Mexican football league, Serie B de México. The team was the second squad of the club Alebrijes de Oaxaca and was founded in 2013, dissolved in 2015 and resumed on July 30, 2021. The team was dissolved again on June 15, 2023 to give way to C.F. Orgullo Reynosa.

== History ==
Alebrijes de Oaxaca was founded in December 2012 from the move of Tecamachalco F.C., due to the fact that this club could not compete in the Ascenso MX. However, since its creation, the club has maintained affiliated teams competing in lower categories of Mexican soccer in order to give its young players minutes to play.

Between 2013 and 2015 the affiliated team had the same name as the club, later in 2015 it was relocated to Malinalco and renamed Colibríes de Malinalco, finally between 2017 and 2018 the team was named Tecamachalco F.C. and was moved to Huixquilucan de Degollado.

In 2019, the club changed owners, so the new board decided to eliminate the policy of affiliated teams and return to developing their own squads. Between 2020 and 2021, Alebrijes maintained an agreement with C.D. Cuautla to send some of his players on loan so that they had professional experience.

On July 30, 2021, the return of the team was made official to take part in the Liga Premier de México, which was formed with players from the Liga TDP team, the youth squads and footballers from other clubs.

On August 26, 2022, Alebrijes de Oaxaca and the Benito Juárez Autonomous University of Oaxaca (UABJO) signed an agreement through which the club was integrated into the sports structure of the university, with the aim of ensuring the continuity of the team in Oaxaca, and have access to university sports facilities. As part of the agreement, the team would be called Alebrijes UABJO, finally that name was adopted by Alebrijes de Oaxaca Premier, leaving the first team with the original name.

In the Clausura 2023 the team won its first championship after defeating T'ho Mayas in the final series of the Liga Premier – Serie B. Later the team won the title of champion of the season after defeating Club Calor, champions of the Apertura 2022 tournament.

== Stadium ==
The Estadio Tecnológico de Oaxaca is a multi-use stadium in Oaxaca City, Oaxaca, Mexico. It is currently used mostly for football matches and is the home stadium for Alebrijes de Oaxaca. The stadium has a capacity of 14,598 people and also includes 72 luxury boxes.

== Honors ==
- Serie B de México Champions: 1

Clausura 2023
