= 2018–19 Liga TDP season =

Liga TDP
- Season: 2018–19
- Dates: 7 September 2018 – 15 June 2019
- Champions: Héroes de Zaci (1st title)
- Promoted: Atlético San Francisco
- Matches: 3,474
- Goals: 11,264 (3.24 per match)
- Top goalscorer: Alan Delgado (61 goals)
- Biggest home win: Correcaminos UAT 15-0 Leones de Nuevo León (30 October 2018)
- Biggest away win: Tlajomulco F.C. 0–12 Atlético San Luis (11 November 2018)
- Longest unbeaten run: Aguacateros CDU Uruapan (36 games)
- Highest attendance: 4,000; Poza Rica vs Camelia (1 March 2019)
- Total attendance: 543,068
- Average attendance: 158
- Stats are from the regular season only

The 2018–19 Liga TDP season is the fourth-tier football league of Mexico. The tournament began on 7 September 2018 and finished on 15 June 2019.

== Competition format ==
The Tercera División (Third Division) is divided into 13 groups. For the 2009/2010 season, the format of the tournament has been reorganized to a home and away format, which all teams will play in their respective group. The 13 groups consist of teams who are eligible to play in the liguilla de ascenso for one promotion spot, teams who are affiliated with teams in the Liga MX, Ascenso MX and Liga Premier, which are not eligible for promotion but will play that who the better filial team in an eight team filial playoff tournament for the entire season.

The league format allows participating franchises to rent their place to another team, so some clubs compete with a different name than the one registered with the FA.

== Group 1 ==
Group with 15 teams from Campeche, Chiapas, Quintana Roo, Tabasco and Yucatán.

Location of teams in the 2018–19 Liga TDP Group 1 (Campeche)
Location of teams in the 2018–19 Liga TDP Group 1 (Quintana Roo)
Location of teams in the 2018–19 Liga TDP Group 1 (Chiapas and Tabasco)
Location of teams in the 2018–19 Liga TDP Group 1 (Yucatán)

=== Teams ===
Team	City	Home ground	Capacity	Affiliate
Campeche	Campeche, Campeche	La Muralla de Kin-Ha	500	—
Cantera Venados	Mérida, Yucatán	Carlos Iturralde	15,087	Venados
Carmen	Ciudad del Carmen, Campeche	UNACAR Campus I	1,000	—
CEFOR Mérida	Mérida, Yucatán	Unidad Deportiva Cefamex	1,000	Pachuca
Cefori Cocodrilos	Villahermosa, Tabasco	Olímpico de Villahermosa	12,000	Cocodrilos de Tabasco
Corsarios de Campeche	Campeche, Campeche	Universitario de Campeche	4,000	—
Delfines Márquez	Campeche, Campeche	Francisco Márquez Segovia	500	—
Deportiva Venados	Tamanché, Yucatán	Alonso Diego Molina	2,500	—
Dragones de Tabasco	Villahermosa, Tabasco	Olímpico de Villahermosa	12,000	—
Felinos 48	Reforma, Chiapas	Sergio Lira Gallardo	600	—
Inter Playa del Carmen	Playa del Carmen, Quintana Roo	Unidad Deportiva Mario Villanueva Madrid	7,500	Inter Playa del Carmen
Mur	Homún, Yucatán	Municipal de Homún	1,000	—
Pioneros Junior	Cancún, Quintana Roo	Cancún 86	6,390	Pioneros de Cancún
Tigrillos de Chetumal	Chetumal, Quintana Roo	10 de Abril	5,000	—
Yalmakán	Puerto Morelos, Quintana Roo	Unidad Deportiva Colonia Pescadores	1,200	Yalmakán

=== League table ===
Pos	Team	Pld	W	D	L	GF	GA	GD	Pts	Qualification
1	Deportiva Venados (Q)	28	23	3	2	82	17	+65	73	Advance to Liguilla
2	Inter Playa del Carmen (Q)	28	19	6	3	61	35	+26	69	Advance to Liguilla
3	Cantera Venados (Q)	28	19	4	5	64	25	+39	64	Advance to Liguilla
4	Felinos 48 (Q)	28	19	3	6	61	28	+33	61	Advance to Liguilla
5	Yalmakán	28	15	8	5	50	19	+31	57	
6	Pioneros Junior	28	13	8	7	50	27	+23	50	
7	Corsarios	28	12	7	9	37	26	+11	45	
8	Cefori Cocodrilos	28	10	7	11	39	40	−1	39	
9	Chetumal	28	8	6	14	33	38	−5	34	
10	Campeche	28	6	8	14	31	45	−14	30	
11	Mur FC	28	8	4	16	24	40	−16	30	
12	Dragones de Tabasco	28	5	6	17	24	69	−45	24	
13	Carmen	28	5	7	16	27	75	−48	24	
14	CEFOR Mérida	28	5	4	19	25	56	−31	22	
15	Delfines Márquez	28	2	1	25	8	77	−69	8	

Updated to match(es) played on May 6, 2019. Source: LigaTDP
(Q) Qualified for the phase indicated

== Group 2 ==
Group with 16 teams from Puebla, San Luis Potosí, Tlaxcala and Veracruz.

=== Teams ===
Location of teams in the 2018–19 Liga TDP Group 2

Team	City	Home ground	Capacity	Affiliate	Official Name
Académicos UGM	Orizaba, Veracruz	Universitario UGM Orizaba	1,500	—	—
Albinegros de Orizaba	Orizaba, Veracruz	UGM Nogales	1,500	Albinegros de Orizaba	—
Alpha	Puebla, Puebla	Club Alpha Cancha 3	600	—	—
Camelia	Zacatlán, Puebla	Morelos	1,000	—	—
Chileros XL	Xalapa, Veracruz	Complejo Omega	1,000	—	—
Delfines UGM	Nogales, Veracruz	UGM Nogales	1,500	—	—
Lobos Chapultepec SAI	Puebla, Puebla	Club Alpha Cancha 3	600	—	Club Puebla SAI
Los Ángeles	Puebla, Puebla	Ex Hacienda San José Maravillas	500	—	—
Papanes de Papantla	Papantla, Veracruz	Fénix Solidaridad	3,000	—	—
Petroleros de Poza Rica	Poza Rica, Veracruz	Heriberto Jara Corona	10,000	—	—
Piratas de Alvarado	Alvarado, Veracruz	Unidad Deportiva Miguel Alemán Valdés	1,500	—	Piñeros de Loma Bonita
Reales de Puebla	Chachapa, Puebla	Unidad Deportiva Chachapa	1,000	—	—
SEP Puebla	Puebla, Puebla	Centro Estatal del Deporte Mario Vázquez Raña	800	Puebla	—
Star Club	Santa Ana Nopalucan, Tlaxcala	U.D. Santa Ana Nopalucan	500	—	—
Sultanes de Tamazunchale	Tamazunchale, San Luis Potosí	Deportivo Solidaridad	1,650	—	—
Tehuacán	Tehuacán, Puebla	Polideportivo La Huizachera	1,000	—	—

=== League table ===
Pos	Team	Pld	W	D	L	GF	GA	GD	Pts	Qualification
1	Alpha (Q)	30	22	5	3	60	18	+42	76	Advance to Liguilla
2	Académicos UGM (Q)	30	22	3	5	75	24	+51	71	Advance to Liguilla
3	Albinegros de Orizaba (Q)	30	20	5	5	77	25	+52	67	Advance to Liguilla
4	Poza Rica (Q)	30	19	4	7	72	34	+38	63	Advance to Liguilla
5	SEP Puebla (Q)	30	18	5	7	77	39	+38	62	Advance to Liguilla
6	Lobos Chapultepec SAI	30	14	8	8	52	40	+12	54	
7	Delfines UGM	30	13	8	9	66	44	+22	52	
8	Camelia	30	11	10	9	52	50	+2	46	
9	Los Ángeles	30	9	9	12	51	50	+1	42	
10	Tehuacán	30	7	12	11	48	53	−5	39	
11	Papanes de Papantla	30	10	3	17	51	65	−14	36	
12	Reales de Puebla	30	9	4	17	35	57	−22	31	
13	Sultanes de Tamazunchale	30	7	4	19	29	86	−57	26	
14	Piratas de Alvarado	30	4	8	18	34	70	−36	22	
15	Star Club	30	5	5	20	29	67	−38	22	
16	Chileros XL	30	3	1	26	16	101	−85	10	

Updated to match(es) played on May 6, 2019. Source: LigaTDP
(Q) Qualified for the phase indicated

== Group 3 ==
Group with 15 teams from Chiapas, Oaxaca and Veracruz.

=== Teams ===
Location of teams in the 2018–19 Liga TDP Group 3 (Chiapas)
Location of teams in the 2018–19 Liga TDP Group 3 (Oaxaca and Veracruz)

Team	City	Home ground	Capacity	Affiliate	Official name
Alebrijes de Oaxaca	Oaxaca, Oaxaca	Tecnológico de Oaxaca	14,598	Alebrijes de Oaxaca	–
Atlético Boca del Río	Boca del Río, Veracruz	Unidad Deportiva Hugo Sánchez	2,500	—	–
Atlético Isla	Isla, Veracruz	Campo Municipal de Isla	1,000	—	–
Atlético Ixtepec	Ixtepec, Oaxaca	Brena Torres	1,000	—	–
Bravos Caballeros	Coscomatepec, Veracruz	Unidad Deportiva "El Huatusquito"	1,000	—	Santos Córdoba
Cafetaleros de Tapachula	Tapachula, Chiapas	Olímpico de Tapachula	18,017	Cafetaleros de Tapachula	–
Chapulineros de Oaxaca	San Jerónimo Tlacochahuaya, Oaxaca	Independiente MRCI	3,000	—	–
Conejos de Tuxtepec	Tuxtepec, Oaxaca	Ing. Guillermo Hernández Castro	4,000	—	–
Córdoba	Córdoba, Veracruz	Rafael Murillo Vidal	3,800	—	Colegio Once México
Cruz Azul Lagunas	Lagunas, Oaxaca	Cruz Azul	1,000	Cruz Azul	–
Porteños	Salina Cruz, Oaxaca	Heriberto Kehoe Vincent	2,000	—	–
Sozca	Lerdo de Tejada, Veracruz	Miguel Seoane Lavín	1,000	—	–
Tehuantepec	Tehuantepec, Oaxaca	Unidad Deportiva Guiengola	5,000	—	Real Pueblo Nuevo
Tenguayacos de Malpaso	Raudales Malpaso, Chiapas	Lic. Adolfo López Mateos	1,000	—	–
Toros Real Xalapa	Huatusco, Veracruz	Colegio Americano Xalapa	1,000	—	Toros Huatusco

=== League table ===
Pos	Team	Pld	W	D	L	GF	GA	GD	Pts	Qualification
1	Córdoba (Q)	28	16	8	4	57	22	+35	60	Advance to Liguilla
2	Chapulineros de Oaxaca (Q)	28	13	10	5	54	32	+22	55	Advance to Liguilla
3	Alebrijes de Oaxaca (Q)	28	17	3	8	53	37	+16	55	Advance to Liguilla de Filiales
4	Cruz Azul Lagunas (Q)	28	14	8	6	47	26	+21	54	Advance to Liguilla
5	Atlético Isla (Q)	28	16	4	8	42	31	+11	53	Advance to Liguilla
6	FC Sozca	28	11	7	10	35	27	+8	46	
7	Porteños	28	10	9	9	53	47	+6	44	
8	Conejos de Tuxtepec	28	10	8	10	38	39	−1	43	
9	Toros Real Xalapa	28	11	5	12	44	40	+4	40	
10	Tenguayacos de Malpaso	28	12	3	13	32	46	−14	40	
11	Cafetaleros de Tapachula	28	7	9	12	33	52	−19	34	
12	Bravos Caballeros	28	8	6	14	23	38	−15	33	
13	Atlético Ixtepec	28	7	6	15	28	44	−16	29	
14	Deportivo Tehuantepec	28	6	6	16	36	59	−23	27	
15	Atlético Boca del Río	28	3	6	19	33	68	−35	17	

Updated to match(es) played on May 6, 2019. Source: LigaTDP
(Q) Qualified for the phase indicated

== Group 4 ==
Group with 20 teams from Greater Mexico City.

=== Teams ===
Location of teams in the 2018–19 Liga TDP Group 4

Team	City	Home ground	Capacity	Affiliate	Official name
Águilas de Teotihuacán	Teotihuacán, State of Mexico	Municipal Teotihuacán	1,200	–	–
Álamos	Venustiano Carranza, Mexico City	Magdalena Mixhuca Sports City	500	–	–
Ángeles de la Ciudad	Iztacalco, Mexico City	Deportivo Rosario Iglesias	6,000	–	–
Atlante	Tultitlán, State of Mexico	Nuevo Territorio Azulgrana	500	Atlante	–
Atlético Estado de México	Cuautitlán Izcalli, State of México	Hugo Sánchez Márquez	3,500	–	–
Aragón	Gustavo A. Madero, Mexico City	Deportivo Francisco Zarco	500	Pachuca	Atlético San Juan de Aragón
Aztecas AMF Soccer	Iztapalapa, Mexico City	Deportivo Eduardo Molina	1,000	–	–
CEFOR Águilas	Coyoacán, Mexico City	Deportivo San Isidro	1,000	América	–
Chilangos	Iztacalco, Mexico City	Deportivo Rosario Iglesias	6,000	–	–
Club Carsaf	Gustavo A. Madero, Mexico City	Deportivo Lázaro Cárdenas	1,000	–	–
Guerreros Aztecas	Amecameca, State of Mexico	Francisco Flores	2,000	–	–
Halcones Zúñiga	Nicolás Romero, State of Mexico	Deportivo San Ildelfonso	1,000	UdeG	–
Leopardos	Iztapalapa, Mexico City	Leandro Valle	1,500	–	–
Marina	Xochimilco, Mexico City	Valentín González	5,000	Cañoneros Marina	–
Novillos Neza	Iztacalco, Mexico City	Magdalena Mixhuca Sports City	500	–	–
Politécnico	Venustiano Carranza, Mexico City	Deportivo Plutarco Elías Calles	2,500	–	–
Proyecto Nuevo Chimalhuacán	Chimalhuacán, State of Mexico	Deportivo La Laguna	2,000	Nuevo Chimalhuacán	–
Pumas UNAM	Coyoacán, Mexico City	La Cantera	2,000	UNAM	–
San José del Arenal	Chalco, State of Mexico	Arreola	2,500	–	–
Sangre de Campeón	Tultitlán, State of Mexico	Cancha Nou Camp	1,000	–	–

=== League table ===
Pos	Team	Pld	W	D	L	GF	GA	GD	Pts	Qualification
1	Pumas UNAM (Q)	38	31	4	3	119	24	+95	101	Advance to Liguilla de Filiales
2	Ángeles de la Ciudad (Q)	38	25	7	6	84	29	+55	87	Advance to Liguilla
3	Atlético Estado de México (Q)	38	25	6	7	102	30	+72	82	Advance to Liguilla
4	Club Carsaf (Q)	38	22	10	6	90	47	+43	82	Advance to Liguilla
5	Aragón F.C. (Q)	38	23	8	7	112	36	+76	81	Advance to Liguilla
6	Chilangos FC (Q)	38	20	11	7	73	39	+34	76	Advance to Liguilla
7	Marina (Q)	38	18	11	9	65	40	+25	71	Advance to Liguilla
8	Sangre de Campeón	38	21	5	12	80	44	+36	70	
9	Álamos	38	19	7	12	73	50	+23	68	
10	Halcones Zúñiga	38	20	1	17	65	65	0	61	
11	Proyecto Nuevo Chimalhuacán	38	13	11	14	43	56	−13	56	
12	Atlante (Q)	38	15	9	14	67	62	+5	55	Advance to Liguilla de Filiales
13	Aztecas AMF Soccer	38	14	5	19	55	84	−29	50	
14	Águilas de Teotihuacán	38	12	7	19	47	63	−16	46	
15	San José del Arenal	38	5	10	23	27	77	−50	28	
16	Guerreros Aztecas	38	6	6	26	35	122	−87	28	
17	Politécnico	38	4	8	26	35	102	−67	27	
18	Cefor Águilas	38	6	6	26	29	97	−68	27	
19	Leopardos	38	2	13	23	16	66	−50	25	
20	Novillos Neza	38	2	9	27	15	99	−84	18	

Updated to match(es) played on May 6, 2019. Source: LigaTDP
(Q) Qualified for the phase indicated

== Group 5 ==
Location of teams in the 2018–19 Liga TDP Group 5

Group with 16 teams from Mexico City and State of Mexico.

=== Teams ===
Team	City	Home ground	Capacity	Affiliate	Official name
Azucareros de Tezonapa	Melchor Ocampo, State of Mexico	Deportivo Municipal Melchor Ocampo	1,000	–	–
CDH	Metepec, State of Mexico	El Mirador	1,000	–	–
Cuervos de Silver Soccer	Xochimilco, Mexico City	San Isidro	1,000	–	–
Diablos Valle de Bravo	Valle de Bravo, State of Mexico	Unidad Deportiva Monte Alto	1,000	Toluca	Deportivo Vallesano FC
Escuela de Alto Rendimiento	Huixquilucan de Degollado, State of Mexico	Universidad Anáhuac México Norte	300	Santos Laguna	–
Estudiantes de Atlacomulco	Atlacomulco, State of Mexico	Unidad Deportiva Las Fuentes	1,000	–	–
Fuerza Mazahua	Ixtlahuaca, State of Mexico	Municipal de Ixtlahuaca	1,000	–	–
Futcenter	Tlalnepantla, State of Mexico	Deportivo Barrientos "Luis García Postigo"	1,000	–	CDU Uruapan
Halcones de Rayón	Rayón, State of Mexico	José Lerma Pérez	1,000	–	–
Héroes de Zací	Iztapalapa, Mexico City	Club Deportivo CENSODEP	1,000	–	–
Leones de Lomar	Metepec, State of Mexico	Unidad Deportiva Emilio Chuayffet	1,000	–	–
Metepec	Metepec, State of Mexico	Unidad Deportiva Alarcón Hisojo	500	–	–
Potros UAEM	Toluca, State of Mexico	Alberto "Chivo" Córdoba	32,603	Potros UAEM	–
Reboceros de Tenancingo	Tenancingo, State of Mexico	JM "Grillo" Cruzalta	3,000	–	Grupo Sherwood
Santa Rosa	Venustiano Carranza, Mexico City	Deportivo Plutarco Elías Calles	1,000	–	–
Tejupilco	Tejupilco, State of Mexico	Unidad Deportiva Tejupilco	1,000	–	–

=== League table ===
Pos	Team	Pld	W	D	L	GF	GA	GD	Pts	Qualification
1	Héroes de Zací (Q)	30	20	7	3	68	21	+47	69	Advance to Liguilla
2	Diablos Valle de Bravo (Q)	30	19	7	4	55	18	+37	67	Advance to Liguilla
3	Fuerza Mazahua (Q)	30	17	10	3	48	14	+34	67	Advance to Liguilla
4	CDH (Q)	30	19	5	6	58	27	+31	65	Advance to Liguilla
5	Potros UAEM	30	18	7	5	64	24	+40	64	
6	Metepec	30	16	5	9	55	38	+17	54	
7	Tejupilco	30	12	12	6	53	42	+11	54	
8	Estudiantes de Atlacomulco	30	11	9	10	47	39	+8	49	
9	Cuervos Silver Soccer	30	11	11	8	43	40	+3	49	
10	Escuela de Alto Rendimiento	30	14	3	13	59	41	+18	46	
11	Azucareros de Tezonapa	30	9	5	16	44	76	−32	33	
12	Leones de Lomar	30	6	5	19	23	64	−41	28	
13	Reboceros de Tenancingo	30	6	3	21	30	60	−30	22	
14	Halcones de Rayón	30	4	7	19	28	72	−44	22	
15	Santa Rosa	30	4	5	21	20	52	−32	21	
16	Futcenter	30	2	3	25	16	85	−69	9	

Updated to match(es) played on May 6, 2019. Source: LigaTDP
(Q) Qualified for the phase indicated

== Group 6 ==
Group with 12 teams from Guerrero, Mexico City, Morelos, Puebla and State of Mexico.

=== Teams ===
Location of teams in the 2018–19 Liga TDP Group 6 (Mexico City, Morelos and Puebla)
Location of teams in the 2018–19 Liga TDP Group 6 (Guerrero)

Team	City	Home ground	Capacity	Affiliate
Acapulco	Acapulco, Guerrero	Hugo Sánchez	6,000	–
Águilas UAGro	Chilpancingo, Guerrero	Andrés Figueroa	2,000	–
Alacranes de Puente de Ixtla	Puente de Ixtla, Morelos	Lino Espín	1,000	–
Atlético Cuernavaca	Cuernavaca, Morelos	Mariano Matamoros	16,000	–
Chilpancingo	Chilpancingo, Guerrero	Polideportivo Vicente Guerrero	1,000	–
Guerreros	Venustiano Carranza, Mexico City	Deportivo Oceanía	1,000	–
Guerreros Pericués	San Andrés Cholula, Puebla	Deportivo Cholula	1,000	–
Iguala	Iguala, Guerrero	Unidad Deportiva Iguala	1,000	–
Lobos BUAP	Puebla, Puebla	CEFOR Lobos BUAP	1,000	Lobos BUAP
JFS Yautepec	Yautepec, Morelos	Unidad Deportiva San Carlos	1,000	–
Rafe Sport	La Magdalena Contreras, Mexico City	Deportivo Casa Popular	1,000	–
Selva Cañera	Emiliano Zapata, Morelos	General Emiliano Zapata	1,000	–

=== League table ===
Pos	Team	Pld	W	D	L	GF	GA	GD	Pts	Qualification
1	Rafe Sport (Q)	33	20	7	6	87	44	+43	73	Advance to Liguilla
2	Selva Cañera (Q)	33	21	5	7	67	29	+38	69	Advance to Liguilla
3	Atlético Cuernavaca (Q)	33	19	9	5	66	24	+42	67	Advance to Liguilla
4	Chilpancingo (Q)	33	16	9	8	56	41	+15	64	Advance to Liguilla
5	Águilas UAGro	33	18	6	9	85	41	+44	62	
6	Guerreros Pericúes	33	15	9	9	66	30	+36	58	
7	Iguala	33	16	5	12	80	56	+24	56	
8	Lobos BUAP	33	13	9	11	46	37	+9	53	
9	Acapulco F.C.	33	9	5	19	57	76	−19	35	
10	Alacranes de Puente de Ixtla	33	6	5	22	27	88	−61	25	
11	Guerreros	33	3	8	22	17	84	−67	21	
12	JFS Yautepec	33	1	5	27	15	117	−102	11	

Updated to match(es) played on May 6, 2019. Source: LigaTDP
(Q) Qualified for the phase indicated

== Group 7 ==
Group with 17 teams from Hidalgo, Mexico City, Puebla and State of Mexico.

=== Teams ===
Location of teams in the 2018–19 Liga TDP Group 7 (Hidalgo and Puebla)
Location of teams in the 2018–19 Liga TDP Group 7 (State of Mexico)

Team	City	Home ground	Capacity	Affiliate	Official name
CEFOR "Chaco" Giménez	Tulancingo, Hidalgo	Primero de Mayo	2,500	–	–
CEFOR Cuauhtémoc Blanco	Huauchinango, Puebla	Nido Águila Huauchinango	300	–	–
Ciervos	Chalco, State of Mexico	Arreola	2,500	Ciervos	–
Cuemanco	Cuautitlán, State of Mexico	Los Pinos	5,000	–	Santiago Tulantepec F.C.
Cuervos Blancos	Cuautitlán, State of Mexico	Los Pinos	5,000	–	–
Faraones de Texcoco	Texcoco, State of Mexico	Claudio Suárez	4,000	–	–
Halcones Negros	Texcoco, State of Mexico	Unidad Deportiva Silverio Pérez	1,000	–	–
Hidalguense	Pachuca, Hidalgo	Club Hidalguense	600	–	–
Independiente Mexiquense	Huehuetoca, State of Mexico	12 de Mayo	1,500	–	–
Matamoros	Zumpango, State of Mexico	El Volcán	500	–	–
Pato Baeza	Texcoco, State of Mexico	Centro de Fútbol Pato Baeza	1,000	–	–
Promodep Central	Cuautitlán, State of Mexico	Deportivo Plutarco Elías Calles	2,000	–	–
Sk Sport Street Soccer	Tulancingo, Hidalgo	Unidad Deportiva Javier Rojo Gómez	2,000	–	–
Texcoco	Papalotla, State of Mexico	Unidad Deportiva Silverio Pérez	1,000	–	–
Tuzos Pachuca	San Agustín Tlaxiaca, Hidalgo	Universidad del Fútbol	1,000	Pachuca	–
Unión Acolman	Acolman, State of Mexico	San Carlos Tepexpan	1,200	–	–
Universidad del Fútbol	San Agustín Tlaxiaca, Hidalgo	Universidad del Fútbol	1,000	Pachuca	–

=== League table ===
Pos	Team	Pld	W	D	L	GF	GA	GD	Pts	Qualification
1	Pachuca (Q)	32	25	6	1	107	20	+87	84	Advance to Liguilla
2	Union Acolman (Q)	32	21	5	6	90	35	+55	73	Advance to Liguilla
3	CEFOR Cuauhtémoc Blanco (Q)	32	22	5	5	81	40	+41	73	Advance to Liguilla
4	Faraones de Texcoco (Q)	32	20	8	4	80	24	+56	72	Advance to Liguilla
5	Hidalguense (Q)	32	18	5	9	71	29	+42	62	Advance to Liguilla
6	Universidad del Fútbol (Q)	32	15	11	6	62	24	+38	62	Advance to Liguilla de Filiales
7	Promodep Central	32	16	5	11	63	55	+8	56	
8	Sk Sport Street Soccer	32	13	10	9	43	28	+15	53	
9	Pato Baeza	32	15	6	11	60	46	+14	53	
10	Halcones Negros	32	15	6	11	53	48	+5	53	
11	Cuervos Blancos	32	9	3	20	36	76	−40	32	
12	Texcoco	32	7	6	19	42	82	−40	30	
13	Ciervos	32	7	3	22	43	88	−45	26	
14	FC Cuemanco	32	8	1	23	26	83	−57	25	
15	Independiente Mexiquense	32	5	5	22	27	88	−61	23	
16	Cefor "Chaco" Giménez	32	6	3	23	28	76	−48	22	
17	C.D. Matamoros	32	5	2	25	30	102	−72	17	

Updated to match(es) played on May 6, 2019. Source: LigaTDP
(Q) Qualified for the phase indicated

== Group 8 ==
Group with 19 teams from Guanajuato, Guerrero, Michoacán and Querétaro.

=== Teams ===
Location of teams in the 2018–19 Liga TDP Group 8 (Guanajuato and Querétaro)
Location of teams in the 2018–19 Liga TDP Group 8 (Michoacán and Guerrero)

Team	City	Home ground	Capacity	Affiliate	Official name
Aguacateros CDU Uruapan	Uruapan, Michoacán	Unidad Deportiva Hermanos López Rayón	5,000	–	–
Atlético Valladolid	Pátzcuaro, Michoacán	Unidad Deportiva de Pátzcuaro	2,000	–	–
Celaya	Celaya, Guanajuato	Instituto Tecnológico Celaya	1,000	Celaya	–
Cocodrilos de Lázaro Cárdenas	Lázaro Cárdenas, Michoacán	Club Pacífico	2,500	–	–
Delfines de Abasolo	Abasolo, Guanajuato	Municipal de Abasolo	2,500	–	–
Guerreros Morelia	Morelia, Michoacán	Unidad Deportiva Cuauhtémoc – C15	1,000	–	Tigres Blancos Gestalt
Guerreros Tzacapu	Zacapu, Michoacán	Municipal Zacapu	2,500	–	Monarcas Zacapu
Iguanas	Zihuatanejo, Guerrero	Unidad Deportiva Zihuatanejo	1,000	–	–
Libertadores	Querétaro, Querétaro	UTEQ	1,000	–	–
Lobos ITECA	Querétaro, Querétaro	Parque Bicentenario	1,000	–	–
Querétaro	Querétaro, Querétaro	Parque Bicentenario	1,000	Querétaro	–
Real Zamora	Zamora, Michoacán	Unidad Deportiva El Chamizal	5,000	Real Zamora	Queseros de San José
Real Querétaro	Huimilpan, Querétaro	Peña Madridista Emilio Butragueño	1,000	–	–
Reboceros de La Piedad	La Piedad, Michoacán	Juan N. López	13,356	Reboceros de La Piedad	–
Sahuayo	Sahuayo, Michoacán	Unidad Deportiva Municipal	1,500	Sahuayo	–
Salamanca	Salamanca, Guanajuato	El Molinito	2,500	–	–
Soria	Comonfort, Guanajuato	Complejo Deportivo Brígido Vargas	1,000	–	–
Titanes de Querétaro	Querétaro, Querétaro	El Pocito ITQ	4,000	–	–
Valle de Santiago	Valle de Santiago, Guanajuato	Camémbaro	1,000	–	Jaral del Progreso F.C.

=== League table ===
Pos	Team	Pld	W	D	L	GF	GA	GD	Pts	Qualification
1	Aguacateros CDU Uruapan (Q)	36	32	4	0	116	18	+98	101	Advance to Liguilla
2	Lobos ITECA (Q)	36	19	10	7	66	38	+28	73	Advance to Liguilla
3	Cocodrilos de Lázaro Cárdenas (Q)	36	19	9	8	76	37	+39	72	Advance to Liguilla
4	Real Zamora (Q)	36	20	6	10	67	43	+24	69	Advance to Liguilla
5	Sahuayo (Q)	36	21	4	11	58	37	+21	68	Advance to Liguilla
6	Celaya (Q)	36	16	12	8	55	28	+27	66	Advance to Liguilla de Filiales
7	Valle F.C. (Q)	36	20	5	11	59	39	+20	66	Advance to Liguilla
8	Delfines de Abasolo	36	20	4	12	75	47	+28	65	
9	Guerreros Tzacapu	36	15	9	12	65	44	+21	60	
10	Atlético Valladolid	36	14	11	11	63	44	+19	59	
11	Reboceros de La Piedad	36	15	7	14	55	53	+2	55	
12	Querétaro	36	14	8	14	61	60	+1	54	
13	Salamanca	36	12	10	14	54	43	+11	48	
14	Iguanas	36	7	10	19	38	75	−37	36	
15	Libertadores	36	8	5	23	39	83	−44	31	
16	Soria	36	8	5	23	47	95	−48	30	
17	Real Querétaro	36	6	6	24	36	103	−67	28	
18	Titanes de Querétaro	36	6	4	26	32	88	−56	26	
19	Guerreros Morelia	36	4	3	29	37	124	−87	17	

Updated to match(es) played on May 6, 2019. Source: LigaTDP
(Q) Qualified for the phase indicated

== Group 9 ==
Group with 20 teams from Durango, Guanajuato, Jalisco, San Luis Potosí and Zacatecas.

=== Teams ===
Location of teams in the 2018–19 Liga TDP Group 9 (Guanajuato)
Location of teams in the 2018–19 Liga TDP Group 9 (Aguascalientes, Jalisco, San Luis Potosí and Zacatecas)
Location of teams in the 2018–19 Liga TDP Group 9 (Durango)

Team	City	Home ground	Capacity	Affiliate	Official name
Alacranes de Durango	Durango, Durango	Francisco Zarco	18,000	Alacranes de Durango	–
Alcaldes de Lagos	San Francisco del Rincón, Guanajuato	Unidad Deportiva Independencia	2,000	–	–
Atlético ECCA	León, Guanajuato	CODE Las Joyas	1,000	–	–
Atlético Leonés	León, Guanajuato	CODE Las Joyas	1,000	–	–
Atlético San Francisco	San Francisco del Rincón, Guanajuato	Domingo Velázquez	3,500	–	–
Atlético San Luis	San Luis Potosí, San Luis Potosí	Complejo Deportivo La Presa	2,000	Atlético San Luis	–
Cabezas Rojas	León, Guanajuato	CODE Las Joyas	1,000	–	–
Frailes de Jerez	Jerez, Zacatecas	Unidad Deportiva de Jerez	1,000	–	FC Zacatecas
León Independiente	León, Guanajuato	CODE Las Joyas	1,000	–	–
Mineros de Fresnillo	Fresnillo, Zacatecas	Minera Fresnillo	6,000	Mineros de Fresnillo	–
Mineros de Zacatecas	Guadalupe, Zacatecas	Unidad Deportiva Guadalupe	500	Mineros de Zacatecas	–
Real Magari	Lagos de Moreno, Jalisco	Club Somnus	2,000	–	–
Real Olmeca Colotlán	Colotlán, Jalisco	Centenario de la Constitución Mexicana	2,000	–	–
San Pancho	San Francisco del Rincón, Guanajuato	Deportiva J. Jesús Rodríguez Barba	1,000	–	CH Fútbol Club
Tancredi	Aguascalientes, Aguascalientes	Enrique Olivares Santana	600	–	Atlético La Mina
Tlajomulco	Abasolo, Guanajuato	Joaquín Sakxim	1,000	–	–
Tuzos UAZ	Zacatecas, Zacatecas	Universitario Unidad Deportiva Norte	5,000	Tuzos UAZ	–
UdeG Lagos de Moreno	Lagos de Moreno, Jalisco	JFV	1,000	Leones Negros UdeG	–
Unión León	León, Guanajuato	Club Empress	500	–	–

=== League table ===
Pos	Team	Pld	W	D	L	GF	GA	GD	Pts	Qualification
1	Atlético San Francisco (Q)	36	30	4	2	122	20	+102	97	Advance to Liguilla
2	Mineros de Zacatecas (Q)	36	29	3	4	101	29	+72	92	Advance to Liguilla de Filiales
3	Tuzos UAZ (Q)	36	27	4	5	82	28	+54	87	Advance to Liguilla
4	Atlético San Luis (Q)	36	26	3	7	120	32	+88	84	Advance to Liguilla
5	Tancredi (Q)	36	22	5	9	81	36	+45	72	Advance to Liguilla
6	Mineros de Fresnillo (Q)	36	18	9	9	80	46	+34	68	Advance to Liguilla
7	Atlético Leonés (Q)	36	19	5	12	77	56	+21	64	Advance to Liguilla
8	Unión León	36	16	5	15	75	60	+15	57	
9	San Pancho FC	36	15	8	13	50	48	+2	57	
10	Atlético ECCA	36	14	6	16	74	65	+9	49	
11	Alacranes de Durango	36	12	8	16	53	51	+2	49	
12	UdeG Lagos de Moreno	36	12	6	18	62	86	−24	44	
13	Real Magari	36	12	5	19	42	64	−22	43	
14	Alcaldes de Lagos	36	12	3	21	47	82	−35	40	
15	Cabezas Rojas	35	6	7	22	29	82	−53	28	
16	Frailes de Jerez	36	7	3	26	35	103	−68	26	
17	León Independiente	35	6	3	26	28	105	−77	22	
18	Real Olmeca Colotlán	36	6	3	27	31	114	−83	22	
19	Tlajomulco	36	5	4	27	31	113	−82	21	

Updated to match(es) played on May 6, 2019. Source: LigaTDP
(Q) Qualified for the phase indicated

== Group 10 ==
Group with 20 teams from Colima and Jalisco.

=== Teams ===
Location of teams in the 2018–19 Liga TDP Group 10

Team	City	Home ground	Capacity	Affiliate	Official name
Acatlán	Acatlán de Juárez, Jalisco	Club Juárez	1,500	–	Futcenter
Atlético Tecomán	Tecomán, Colima	Víctor Eduardo Sevilla Torres	2,000	–	–
Aves Blancas	Tepatitlán de Morelos, Jalisco	Corredor Industrial	1,200	–	–
CAFESSA	Tlajomulco de Zúñiga, Jalisco	Unidad Deportiva Mariano Otero	3,000	CAFESSA	–
Catedráticos Élite	Tlaquepaque, Jalisco	Campo Maracaná	1,000	–	Real Victoria Carmen
CEFOR ALR	Zapopan, Jalisco	Tres de Marzo	18,779	Tecos	–
Charales de Chapala	Chapala, Jalisco	Municipal Juan Rayo	1,000	–	–
Deportivo Salcido	Ocotlán, Jalisco	Complejo Salcido	1,000	–	–
Escuela de Fútbol Chivas	Zapopan, Jalisco	Verde Valle	800	Guadalajara	–
Gallos Viejos	Zapopan, Jalisco	Eurocenter Alto Rendimiento	1,000	–	–
Gorilas de Juanacatlán	Juanacatlán, Jalisco	Club Juanacatlán	500	–	–
Leones Negros UdeG	Zapopan, Jalisco	La Primavera	3,000	Leones Negros UdeG	–
Nacional Palmac	Guadalajara, Jalisco	Olímpico Parque Solidaridad	1,000	–	Palmac
Oro	Zapopan, Jalisco	Club Hacienda Real	1,000	–	–
Real Ánimas de Sayula	Sayula, Jalisco	Gustavo Díaz Ordaz	1,000	–	–
Rojos de Colima	Colima City, Colima	Colima	12,000	–	Fut-Car
Tapatíos Soccer	Guadalajara, Jalisco	Colegio Once México	1,000	–	–
Tepatitlán	Tepatitlán de Morelos, Jalisco	Gregorio "Tepa" Gómez	12,500	Tepatitlán	–
Textileros de Zapotlanejo	Zapotlanejo, Jalisco	Miguel Hidalgo	1,500	–	Halcones Grises del Valle del Grullo
Tornados Tlaquepaque	Tlaquepaque, Jalisco	San Andrés	2,500	–	Atlético Cocula

=== League table ===
Pos	Team	Pld	W	D	L	GF	GA	GD	Pts	Qualification
1	CAFESSA (Q)	38	24	8	6	83	40	+43	84	Advance to Liguilla
2	Atlético Tecomán (Q)	38	20	12	6	80	39	+41	82	Advance to Liguilla
3	Gorilas de Juanacatlán (Q)	38	23	8	7	87	40	+47	81	Advance to Liguilla
4	Escuela de Fútbol Chivas (Q)	38	20	11	7	59	35	+24	78	Advance to Liguilla de Filiales
5	Acatlán F.C. (Q)	38	19	10	9	65	43	+22	74	Advance to Liguilla
6	Tapatíos Soccer (Q)	38	17	11	10	64	46	+18	68	Advance to Liguilla
7	Leones Negros UdeG (Q)	38	17	9	12	71	43	+28	64	Advance to Liguilla de Filiales
8	Rojos de Colima (Q)	38	14	12	12	61	50	+11	61	Advance to Liguilla
9	Aves Blancas	38	16	6	16	52	44	+8	57	
10	Oro	38	13	12	13	54	53	+1	57	
11	Gallos Viejos	38	15	9	14	54	62	−8	54	
12	Textileros de Zapotlanejo	38	14	8	16	45	42	+3	53	
13	Deportivo Salcido	38	14	7	17	48	61	−13	53	
14	Tepatitlán	38	15	5	18	59	68	−9	52	
15	Catedráticos Elite F.C.	38	10	12	16	41	57	−16	50	
16	Real Ánimas de Sayula	38	12	9	17	49	55	−6	49	
17	Charales de Chapala	38	11	8	19	45	64	−19	44	
18	Nacional Palmac	38	5	12	21	35	75	−40	33	
19	Tornados Tlaquepaque	38	7	8	23	36	72	−36	32	
20	CEFOR ALR	38	3	5	30	19	118	−99	14	

Updated to match(es) played on May 6, 2019. Source: LigaTDP
(Q) Qualified for the phase indicated

== Group 11 ==
Group with 15 teams from Jalisco, Nayarit and Sinaloa.

=== Teams ===
Location of teams in the 2018–19 Liga TDP Group 11 (Jalisco and Nayarit)
Location of teams in the 2018–19 Liga TDP Group 11 (Sinaloa)

Team	City	Home ground	Capacity	Affiliate	Official name
Águilas UAS	Culiacán, Sinaloa	Universitario UAS	3,500	–	–
Atlas	El Salto, Jalisco	CECAF	500	Atlas	–
Autlán	Autlán de Navarro, Jalisco	Unidad Deportiva Chapultepec	1,500	–	Gallos Hidrocálidos
Camaroneros de Escuinapa	Escuinapa, Sinaloa	Perla Camaronera	1,000	–	–
CEFUT Laguneros	Jocotepec, Jalisco	Municipal de Jocotepec	2,000	–	–
Deportivo Cimagol	Tlaquepaque, Jalisco	Club Vaqueros Ixtlán	1,000	–	–
Dorados de Sinaloa	Culiacán, Sinaloa	Unidad Deportiva Sagarpa	1,000	Dorados de Sinaloa	–
Guadalajara	Zapopan, Jalisco	Verde Valle	800	Guadalajara	–
Juventud Unida	Zapopan, Jalisco	Chivas Chapalita	1,000	–	–
Mazorqueros de Zapotlán	Ciudad Guzmán, Jalisco	Municipal Santa Rosa	3,500	–	–
Real Bajío	Zapopan, Jalisco	El Bajío	1,000	–	Atlético Culiacán
Sufacen Tepic	Tepic, Nayarit	Club Sufacen Libramiento	500	–	–
Tecos	Zapopan, Jalisco	Tres de Marzo	18,779	Tecos	–
Volcanes de Colima	Tala, Jalisco	Centro Deportivo y Cultural 24 de Marzo	3,000	–	–
Xalisco	Xalisco, Nayarit	Unidad Deportiva Landereñas	500	–	–

=== League table ===
Pos	Team	Pld	W	D	L	GF	GA	GD	Pts	Qualification
1	Atlas (Q)	28	18	7	3	70	18	+52	67	Advance to Liguilla de Filiales
2	Guadalajara (Q)	28	17	8	3	68	26	+42	62	Advance to Liguilla de Filiales
3	CEFUT Laguneros (Q)	28	17	7	4	54	25	+29	60	Advance to Liguilla
4	Mazorqueros de Zapotlán (Q)	28	17	6	5	56	28	+28	60	Advance to Liguilla
5	Xalisco (Q)	28	15	7	6	53	21	+32	58	Advance to Liguilla
6	Camaroneros de Escuinapa (Q)	28	13	7	8	37	30	+7	49	Advance to Liguilla
7	Tecos (Q)	28	11	8	9	43	30	+13	48	Advance to Liguilla de Filiales
8	Águilas UAS (Q)	28	11	7	10	47	44	+3	45	Advance to Liguilla
9	Sufacen Tepic	28	13	2	13	69	51	+18	41	
10	Volcanes de Colima	28	8	7	13	40	63	−23	31	
11	Deportivo Cimagol	28	9	3	16	39	63	−24	31	
12	Dorados de Sinaloa	28	7	5	16	31	41	−10	29	
13	Real Bajío	28	5	8	15	32	58	−26	25	
14	Juventud Unida	28	2	5	21	12	74	−62	13	
15	Autlán F.C.	28	3	1	24	14	93	−79	11	

Updated to match(es) played on May 6, 2019. Source: LigaTDP
(Q) Qualified for the phase indicated

== Group 12 ==
Group with 20 teams from Coahuila, Nuevo León and Tamaulipas.

=== Teams ===
Location of teams in the 2018–19 Liga TDP Group 12 (Tamaulipas)
Location of teams in the 2018–19 Liga TDP Group 12 (Nuevo León)
Location of teams in the 2018–19 Liga TDP Group 12 (Coahuila)

Team	City	Home ground	Capacity	Affiliate	Official name
Atlético Allende	Piedras Negras, Coahuila	La Madriguera	1,000	–	–
Atlético Altamira	Altamira, Tamaulipas	Lázaro Cárdenas	2,500	–	–
Bravos de Nuevo Laredo	Nuevo Laredo, Tamaulipas	Unidad Deportiva Benito Juárez	5,000	–	–
Bucaneros de Matamoros	Matamoros, Tamaulipas	Pedro Salazar Maldonado	3,000	–	–
Cadereyta	Cadereyta, Nuevo León	Alfonso Martínez Domínguez	1,000	–	–
Correcaminos UAT	Ciudad Victoria, Tamaulipas	Universitario Eugenio Alvizo Porras	5,000	Correcaminos UAT	–
FCD Bulls Santiago	Santiago, Nuevo León	El Barrial	570	FC Dallas	–
Frontera RP	Río Bravo, Tamaulipas	Las Liebres	1,000	–	–
Gavilanes de Matamoros	Matamoros, Tamaulipas	El Hogar	22,000	Gavilanes de Matamoros	Ho Gar H Matamoros
Halcones de Saltillo	Saltillo, Coahuila	Olímpico Francisco I. Madero	7,000	–	San Isidro Laguna F.C.
Intocables	Monterrey, Nuevo León	Ciudad Deportiva Monterrey	1,000	–	–
Inter Guadalupe	Guadalupe, Nuevo León	CEDEREG	1,000	–	Plateados de Cerro Azul
Real Acuña	Ciudad Acuña, Coahuila	Pista Eduardo Moreira	1,000	–	Unión Magdalena Contreras
Real San Cosme	Reynosa, Tamaulipas	El Hogar	22,000	–	–
Monterrey	Santiago, Nuevo León	El Barrial	570	Monterrey	–
Orgullo Surtam	Tampico, Tamaulipas	Unidad Deportiva Tampico	1,500	–	–
Saltillo Soccer	Saltillo, Coahuila	Olímpico Francisco I. Madero	7,000	Atlético Saltillo Soccer	–
San Nicolás	San Nicolás de los Garza, Nuevo León	Unidad Deportiva Oriente	1,000	–	–
Tigres SD	General Zuazua, Nuevo León	La Cueva de Zuazua	800	Tigres UANL	–
Troyanos UDEM	San Pedro Garza García, Nuevo León	Universidad de Monterrey	1,000	–	–

=== League table ===
Pos	Team	Pld	W	D	L	GF	GA	GD	Pts	Qualification
1	Monterrey (Q)	36	26	4	6	93	30	+63	86	Advance to Liguilla de Filiales
2	Gavilanes de Matamoros (Q)	36	22	9	5	74	34	+40	83	Advance to Liguilla
3	Correcaminos UAT (Q)	36	23	5	8	102	30	+72	75	Advance to Liguilla de Filiales
4	Saltillo Soccer (Q)	36	23	4	9	104	29	+75	74	Advance to Liguilla
5	Orgullo Surtam (Q)	36	20	9	7	85	41	+44	73	Advance to Liguilla
6	Tigres UANL (Q)	36	21	7	8	71	32	+39	73	Advance to Liguilla de Filiales
7	Intocables (Q)	36	18	10	8	66	29	+37	72	Advance to Liguilla
8	FCD Bulls Santiago	35	18	11	6	72	42	+30	71	
9	Atlético Altamira (Q)	36	16	8	12	72	55	+17	57	Advance to Liguilla
10	Troyanos UDEM (Q)	36	13	12	11	66	45	+21	56	Advance to Liguilla
11	Bravos de Nuevo Laredo	36	15	6	15	81	58	+23	54	
12	Frontera RP	36	10	9	17	42	50	−8	45	
13	San Nicolás	36	9	8	19	50	86	−36	39	
14	Real Acuña	36	8	11	17	51	98	−47	39	
15	Cadereyta	36	7	10	19	36	91	−55	36	
16	Halcones de Saltillo	36	8	3	25	46	79	−33	28	
17	Atlético Allende	36	6	5	25	39	127	−88	26	
18	Inter Guadalupe	36	4	6	26	26	106	−80	20	
19	Real San Cosme	35	4	3	28	27	141	−114	15	
20	Bucaneros de Matamoros	0	0	0	0	0	0	0	0	Withdrawn from the competition

Updated to match(es) played on May 6, 2019. Source: LigaTDP
(Q) Qualified for the phase indicated

== Group 13 ==
Group with 10 teams from Chihuahua, Coahuila and Sonora.

=== Teams ===
Location of teams in the 2018–19 Liga TDP Group 13

Team	City	Home ground	Capacity	Affiliate	Official name
Cimarrones de Sonora	Hermosillo, Sonora	Miguel Castro Servín	4,000	Cimarrones de Sonora	–
Cobras Fut Premier	Ciudad Juárez, Chihuahua	20 de Noviembre	2,500	–	–
Héroes de Caborca	Caborca, Sonora	Fidencio Hernández	3,000	–	–
Juárez	Ciudad Juárez, Chihuahua	Complejo Entrenamiento Bravo	500	Juárez	–
Guaymas	Guaymas, Sonora	Unidad Deportiva Julio Alfonso	1,000	–	–
Huatabampo	Huatabampo, Sonora	Unidad Deportiva Baldomero "Melo" Aldama	1,000	–	–
La Tribu de Ciudad Juárez	Ciudad Juárez, Chihuahua	20 de Noviembre	2,500	–	–
Soles de Ciudad Juárez	Ciudad Juárez, Chihuahua	20 de Noviembre	2,500	–	–
Tijuana	Hermosillo, Sonora	Miguel Castro Servín	4,000	Tijuana	–
Victoria	San Pedro de las Colonias, Coahuila	Unidad Deportiva Benito Juárez	1,000	–	FC Toros

=== League table ===
Pos	Team	Pld	W	D	L	GF	GA	GD	Pts	Qualification
1	Juárez (Q)	22	18	4	0	56	14	+42	60	Advance to Liguilla de Filiales
2	Tijuana (Q)	22	12	7	3	42	26	+16	45	Advance to Liguilla de Filiales
3	Soles de Ciudad Juárez (Q)	22	12	4	6	54	27	+27	43	Advance to Liguilla
4	Huatabampo (Q)	22	9	6	7	45	29	+16	35	Advance to Liguilla
5	La Tribu de Ciudad Juárez (Q)	22	9	4	9	40	30	+10	34	Advance to Liguilla
6	Guaymas	22	9	4	9	35	30	+5	32	
7	Victoria	22	7	6	9	26	32	−6	30	
8	Cimarrones de Sonora	22	6	6	10	26	34	−8	28	
9	Héroes de Caborca	22	2	3	17	15	77	−62	12	
10	Cobras Fut Premier	22	2	4	16	15	55	−40	11	

Updated to match(es) played on May 6, 2019. Source: LigaTDP
(Q) Qualified for the phase indicated

== Promotion Playoffs ==
The Promotion Playoffs will consist of seven phases. Classify 64 teams, the number varies according to the number of teams in each group, being between three and six clubs per sector. The country will be divided into two zones: South Zone (Groups I to VII) and North Zone (Groups VIII to XIII). Eliminations will be held according to the average obtained by each group, being ordered from best to worst by their percentage throughout the season.

=== Round of 64 ===
The first legs were played on 8 and 9 May, and the second legs were played on 11 and 12 May 2019.

==== South Zone ====
Team 1	Agg.	Team 2	1st leg	2nd leg
Tuzos Pachuca	2–0	Marina	1–0	1–0
Deportiva Venados	2–2 (3–4)	(p.) Atlético Isla	1–1	1–1
Alpha	4–4 (3–4)	(p.) Cruz Azul Lagunas	3–4	1–0
Inter Playa	4–5	Hidalguense	1–4	3–1
Universidad del Golfo	3–1	Chilpancingo	0–1	3–0
Héroes de Zací (p.)	3–3 (4–2)	Chapulineros de Oaxaca	1–2	2–1
Ángeles de la Ciudad	1–0	Chilangos FC	0–0	1–0
Cantera Venados	3–1	Atlético Cuernavaca	0–1	3–0
Unión Acolman	7–2	SEP Puebla	3–0	4–2
Cefor Cuauhtémoc Blanco	4–1	Selva Cañera	3–1	1–0
Faraones Texcoco	5–0	Poza Rica	1–0	4–0
Aragón FC	2–4	Albinegros	1–0	1–4
Diablos Valle de Bravo	2–1	Córdoba FC	0–0	2–1
Fuerza Mazahua	2–0	Club Carsaf	1–0	1–0
Atlético Estado de México	3–2	RAFE Sport	1–2	2–0
Felinos 48	0–2	CDH	0–2	0–0

==== North Zone ====
Team 1	Agg.	Team 2	1st leg	2nd leg
Aguacateros CDU	4–1	La Tribu de Ciudad Juárez	1–0	3–1
Atlético San Francisco	11–2	Troyanos UDEM	6–0	5–2
Tuzos UAZ	5–1	Atlético Altamira	3–1	2–0
Atlético San Luis	5–5 (5–6)	(p.) Huatabampo FC	1–2	4–3
Gavilanes	3–2	Rojos de Colima	1–1	2–1
CAFESSA	1–2	Águilas UAS	1–0	0–2
Atlético Tecomán	1–4	Camaroneros de Escuinapa	0–1	1–3
CEFUT	3–3 (5–4)	Atlético Leonés	0–2	3–1
Mazorqueros F.C. (p.)	5–5 (4–2)	Tapatíos Soccer	2–2	3–3
Gorilas de Juanacatlán	9–1	Valle FC	4–1	5–0
Xalisco	3–0	Sahuayo	2–0	1–0
Saltillo Soccer	4–1	Mineros de Fresnillo	2–0	2–1
Orgullo Surtam	X–X	Real Zamora	X–X	X–X
Lobos ITECA	2–10	Acatlán	1–5	2–10
Tancredi	1–2	Soles de Ciudad Juárez	1–2	0–0
Intocables	1–2	Cocodrilos de Lázaro Cárdenas	2–0	0–1

=== Round of 32 ===
The first legs will be played on 15 and 16 May, and the second legs will be played on 18 and 19 May 2019.

==== South Zone ====
Team 1	Agg.	Team 2	1st leg	2nd leg
Tuzos Pachuca	7–1	Atlético Isla	0–0	7–1
Universidad del Golfo	0–3	Cruz Azul Lagunas	0–1	0–2
Héroes de Zací	4–3	Hidalguense	1–2	3–1
Ángeles de la Ciudad	2–1	Atlético Estado de México	0–0	2–1
Cantera Venados	4–3	CDH	0–1	4–2
Unión Acolman	4–3	Fuerza Mazahua	2–2	2–1
Cefor Cuauhtémoc Blanco	1–1 (4–5)	(p.) Diablos Valle de Bravo	1–1	0–0
Faraones Texcoco	4–0	Albinegros	1–0	3–0

==== North Zone ====
Team 1	Agg.	Team 2	1st leg	2nd leg
Aguacateros CDU	5–2	Huatabampo FC	1–2	4–0
Atlético San Francisco	6–2	Águilas UAS	0–1	6–1
Tuzos UAZ	2–0	Camaroneros de Escuinapa	0–0	2–0
Gavilanes	1–3	Acatlán	0–2	1–1
CEFUT	5–3	Soles de Ciudad Juárez	1–3	4–0
Mazorqueros F.C.	3–2	Cocodrilos de Lázaro Cárdenas	1–2	2–0
Gorilas de Juanacatlán	2–2 (2-4)	(p.) Orgullo Surtam	0–2	2–0
Xalisco	2–2 (5–6)	(p.) Saltillo Soccer	0–1	2–1

=== Final stage ===
Until the championship series, the teams are divided into two geographical zones: South and North, the participants will be seeded according to their position in the general classification table and their location. In the final series, the winners of each of the two zones will face each other.

Round of 16
2S	Héroes de Zací	2	2	4
7S	Diablos Valle de Bravo	1	0	1
1S	Tuzos Pachuca	1	0	1
8S	Cruz Azul Lagunas	2	1	3
3S	Ángeles de la Ciudad	1	1	2
6S	Faraones Texcoco	1	0	1
4S	Cantera Venados	0	2	2 (2)
5S	Unión Acolman (p.)	0	2	2 (4)
1N	Aguacateros CDU (p.)	1	1	2 (4)
8N	Acatlán	2	0	2 (3)
4N	CEFUT	2	1	3 (3)
5N	Mazorqueros F.C.	1	2	3 (4)
2N	Atlético San Francisco	2	5	7
7N	Orgullo Surtam	1	0	1
3N	Tuzos UAZ	0	0	0
6N	Saltillo Soccer	1	3	3

Quarter-finals
2S	Héroes de Zací	2	1	3
8S	Cruz Azul Lagunas	2	0	2
3S	Ángeles de la Ciudad	0	3	3
5S	Unión Acolman	1	0	1
1N	Aguacateros CDU	1	2	3
6N	Saltillo Soccer	2	0	2
2N	Atlético San Francisco	1	3	4
5N	Mazorqueros F.C.	2	0	2

Semi-finals
2S	Héroes de Zací	2	0	2
3S	Ángeles de la Ciudad	0	1	1
1N	Aguacateros CDU	1	1	2
2N	Atlético San Francisco	2	2	4

Final
2S	Héroes de Zaci	2	1	3
2N	Atlético San Francisco	2	0	2

==== Round of 16 ====
The first legs were played on 22 and 23 May, and the second legs will be played on 25 and 26 May 2019.

Team 1	Agg.	Team 2	1st leg	2nd leg
Tuzos Pachuca	1–3	Cruz Azul Lagunas	1–2	0–1
Héroes de Zací	4–1	Diablos Valle de Bravo	2–1	2–0
Ángeles de la Ciudad	2–1	Faraones Texcoco	1–1	1–0
Cantera Venados	2–2 (2–4)	(p.) Unión Acolman	0–0	2–2
Aguacateros CDU (p.)	2–2 (4–3)	Acatlán	1–2	1–0
Atlético San Francisco	7–1	Orgullo Surtam	2–1	5–0
Tuzos UAZ	0–3	Saltillo Soccer	0–1	0–3
CEFUT	3–3 (3–4)	(p.) Mazorqueros F.C.	2–1	1–2

===== First leg =====
22 May 2019	Acatlán	2–1	Aguacateros CDU	Acatlán
12:00	Reyes 21'; Silva 69'	Report	Menera 9'	Stadium: Club Juárez; Attendance: 800; Referee: Alan Cristóbal Rodríguez Cancino

22 May 2019	Orgullo Surtam	1–2	Atlético San Francisco	Tampico
15:00	J. Hernández 34'	Report	Vázquez 50'; A. Hernández 65' (own)	Stadium: Estadio Olímpico U.D. Tampico; Attendance: 300; Referee: Héctor Emilio Contreras Sotelo

22 May 2019	Diablos Valle de Bravo	1–2	Héroes de Zací	Valle de Bravo
16:00	Hérnandez 41'	Report	Cibrian 89'; Pérez 90+2'	Stadium: Unidad Deportiva Monte Alto; Attendance: 150; Referee: Brandon Tapia Pérez

22 May 2019	Saltillo Soccer	1–0	Tuzos UAZ	Saltillo
16:00	Sáenz 10'	Report		Stadium: Estadio Olímpico Francisco I. Madero; Attendance: 1,000; Referee: Iván Alberto Castro Zamora

22 May 2019	Faraones Texcoco	1–1	Ángeles de la Ciudad	Texcoco
16:00	Botello 90'	Report	Perales 50'	Stadium: Estadio Municipal Claudio Suárez; Attendance: 1,600; Referee: Andrés Villaseñor Miranda

23 May 2019	Unión Acolman	0–0	Cantera Venados	Acolman
11:00		Report		Stadium: Estadio San Carlos Tepexpan; Attendance: 400; Referee: Edson Enrique Castañón Ramírez

23 May 2019	Cruz Azul Lagunas	2–1	Tuzos Pachuca	Lagunas
15:00	Soto 68', 86'	Report	López 90+4'	Stadium: Estadio Cruz Azul; Attendance: 800; Referee: Brian Jair Jiménez Morales

23 May 2019	Mazorqueros F.C.	1–2	CEFUT	Ciudad Guzmán
19:00	Rodríguez 29'	Report	Barajas 26'; Reynoso 75'	Stadium: Estadio Municipal Santa Rosa; Attendance: 3,400; Referee: Adrián Chafino García

===== Second leg =====
25 May 2019	Ángeles de la Ciudad	1–0 (2–1 agg.)	Faraones Texcoco	Mexico City
11:00	Macías 45' (own)	Report		Stadium: Deportivo Rosario Iglesias; Attendance: 0 Referee: Miguel Ángel Morales Sánchez

25 May 2019	Tuzos UAZ	0–3 (0–3 agg.)	Saltillo Soccer	Zacatecas
12:00	Aguilar 3'; Ruíz 48'; Gallegos 60'; Santamaría 78'	Report	Ramos 50'	Stadium: Estadio Universitario U.D. Norte; Attendance: 10; Referee: José Misael Burruel Zazueta

25 May 2019	Aguacateros CDU	1–0 (2–2 agg.) (4–3 p)	Acatlán	Uruapan
15:30	Castellón 64'	Report		Stadium: Unidad Deportiva Hermanos López Rayón; Attendance: 5,000; Referee: Rafael Bonilla Vargas

25 May 2019	Atlético San Francisco	5–0 (7–1 agg.)	Orgullo Surtam	San Francisco del Rincón
16:00	Vázquez 2', 50'; Sánchez 48'; Ruíz 56' (own); Chávez 61'	Report		Stadium: Estadio Domingo Velázquez; Attendance: 800; Referee: Óscar Eduardo Peña Dávila

25 May 2019	Héroes de Zací	2–1 (4–1 agg.)	Diablos Valle de Bravo	Mexico City
17:00	Malpica 60'; Cibrian 89'	Report		Stadium: Deportivo Lázaro Cárdenas; Attendance: 300; Referee: Tomás Jaír Salazar Rivera

26 May 2019	Tuzos Pachuca	0–1 (1–3 agg.)	Cruz Azul Lagunas	San Agustín Tlaxiaca
10:00		Report	Ruíz 65'	Stadium: Universidad del Fútbol; Attendance: 500; Referee: Edgar Pablo Villa

26 May 2019	CEFUT	1-2 (3-3 agg.) (3-4 p)	Mazorqueros F.C.	Zapopan
12:00	Arana 11'	Report	Zepeda 29', 36'	Stadium: Estadio CEFUT; Attendance: 600; Referee: Eduardo Reynoso Martínez

26 May 2019	Cantera Venados	2–2 (2–2 agg.) (2–4 p)	Unión Acolman	Mérida
16:30	Lara 46'; Mayo 61'	Report	Castillo 42'; Garibay 54'	Stadium: Estadio Carlos Iturralde; Attendance: 300; Referee: Jael Alcàntara Maldonado

==== Quarter-finals ====
The first legs were played on 29 May, and the second legs will be played on 1 June 2019.

Team 1	Agg.	Team 2	1st leg	2nd leg
Héroes de Zací	3–2	Cruz Azul Lagunas	2–2	1–0
Ángeles de la Ciudad	3–1	Unión Acolman	0–1	3–0
Aguacateros CDU	3–2	Saltillo Soccer	1–2	2–0
Atlético San Francisco	4–2	Mazorqueros F.C.	1–2	3–0

===== First leg =====
29 May 2019	Unión Acolman	1–0	Ángeles de la Ciudad	Acolman
11:00	Velázquez 12'	Report		Stadium: Estadio San Carlos Tepexpan; Attendance: 200; Referee: Adrián Chafino García

29 May 2019	Cruz Azul Lagunas	2–2	Héroes de Zací	Lagunas
16:00	Ruíz 22'; Vargas 59'	Report	Ayuso 58'; Cibrian 79'	Stadium: Estadio Cruz Azul; Attendance: 700; Referee: Jaime Orlando Montes Santos

29 May 2019	Saltillo Soccer	2–1	Aguacateros CDU	Saltillo
16:00	Ordóñez 12'; Góngora 52'	Report	Quiroz 20'	Stadium: Estadio Olímpico Francisco I. Madero; Attendance: 800; Referee: Luis Daniel Leyva Rios

29 May 2019	Mazorqueros F.C.	2–1	Atlético San Francisco	Ciudad Guzmán
19:00	Rodríguez 27'; Oceguera 58'	Report	Vázquez 50'	Stadium: Estadio Municipal Santa Rosa; Attendance: 3,500; Referee: Aldo Ballesteros Barba

===== Second leg =====
1 June 2019	Ángeles de la Ciudad	3–0 (3–1 agg.)	Unión Acolman	Mexico City
11:00	Perales 9', 71'; Castillo 50'	Report		Stadium: Deportivo Rosario Iglesias; Attendance: 400; Referee: Rafael Bonilla Vargas

1 June 2019	Agucateros CDU	2–0 (3–2 agg.)	Saltillo Soccer	Uruapan
15:30	Mota 13'; Quiróz 55'	Report		Stadium: Unidad Deportiva Hermanos López Rayón; Attendance: 5,000; Referee: Tomás Jair Salazar Rivera

1 June 2019	Atlético San Francisco	3–0 (4–2 agg.)	Mazorqueros F.C.	San Francisco del Rincón
16:00	Sánchez 16'; López 39'; Ruíz 47'	Report		Stadium: Estadio Domingo Velázquez; Attendance: 3,000; Referee: Ricardo Emmanuel Chávez Sánchez

1 June 2019	Héroes de Zací	1–0 (3–2 agg.)	Cruz Azul Lagunas	Mexico City
17:00	Bahena 61'	Report		Stadium: Deportivo Lázaro Cárdenas; Attendance: 600; Referee: Edson Enrique Castañón Ramírez

==== Semi-finals ====
The first legs were played on 5 June, and the second legs will be played on 8 June 2019.

Team 1	Agg.	Team 2	1st leg	2nd leg
Héroes de Zací	2–1	Ángeles de la Ciudad	2–0	0–1
Aguacateros CDU	2–4	Atlético San Francisco	1–2	1–2

===== First leg =====
5 June 2019	Ángeles de la Ciudad	0–2	Héroes de Zací	Mexico City
11:00		Report	Alarcón 30', 52'	Stadium: Deportivo Rosario Iglesias; Attendance: 300; Referee: Adrián Chafino García

5 June 2019	Atlético San Francisco	2–1	Aguacateros CDU	San Francisco del Rincón
17:30	Sánchez 26'; Chávez 50'	Report	Peña 83'	Stadium: Estadio Domingo Velázquez; Attendance: 2,500; Referee: Tomás Jair Salazar Rivera

===== Second leg =====
8 June 2019	Aguacateros CDU	1–2 (2–4 agg.)	Atlético San Francisco	Uruapan
15:30	Meza 75'	Report	Vázquez 43'; Ruíz 87'	Stadium: Unidad Deportiva Hermanos López Rayón; Attendance: 7,000; Referee: Rafael Bonilla Vargas

8 June 2019	Héroes de Zací	0–1 (2–1 agg.)	Ángeles de la Ciudad	Mexico City
17:00		Report	Perea 72'	Stadium: Deportivo Lázaro Cárdenas; Attendance: 700; Referee: Ricardo Emmanuel Chávez Sánchez

==== Final ====
The first leg was played on 12 June, and the second leg was played on 15 June 2019.

Team 1	Agg.	Team 2	1st leg	2nd leg
Héroes de Zaci	3–2	Atlético San Francisco	2–2	1–0

===== First leg =====
12 June 2019	Héroes de Zaci	2–2	Atlético San Francisco	Mexico City
11:00	Pérez 51'; Bahena 82'	Report	Vázquez 50'; Hernández 90+1'	Stadium: Deportivo Lázaro Cárdenas; Attendance: 500; Referee: Rafael Bonilla Vargas

===== Second leg =====
15 June 2019	Atlético San Francisco	0–1 (2–3 agg.)	Héroes de Zaci	San Francisco del Rincón
16:30		Report	Alarcón 70'	Stadium: Estadio Domingo Velázquez; Attendance: 3,200; Referee: Ricardo Emmanuel Chávez Sánchez

2018-2019 winners:

1st title

== Reserve Teams ==
=== Table ===
P	Team	Pts	G	Pts/G	GD
1	Juárez	60	22	2.73	42
2	Pumas UNAM	101	38	2.66	95
3	Mineros de Zacatecas	92	36	2.56	72
4	Atlas	67	28	2.39	52
5	Monterrey	86	36	2.39	63
6	Guadalajara	62	28	2.21	42
7	Correcaminos UAT	75	36	2.08	72
8	Escuela de Fútbol Chivas	78	38	2.05	24
9	Tijuana	45	22	2.05	16
10	Tigres UANL	73	36	2.03	39
11	Alebrijes de Oaxaca	55	28	1.96	16
12	Universidad del Fútbol	62	32	1.94	38
13	Celaya	66	36	1.83	27
14	Tecos	48	28	1.71	13
15	Leones Negros UdeG	64	38	1.68	28
16	Atlante	55	38	1.45	5
17	Alacranes de Durango	49	36	1.36	2
18	Cimarrones de Sonora	28	22	1.27	-8
19	UdeG Lagos de Moreno	44	36	1.22	-24
20	Cafetaleros de Tapachula	34	28	1.21	-19
21	Mur FC	30	28	1.07	-16
22	Dorados de Sinaloa	29	28	1.04	-10
23	Cadereyta F.C.	36	36	1.00	-55
24	Dragones de Tabasco	24	28	0.86	-45
25	Ciervos F.C.	26	32	0.81	-45
26	CEFOR Mérida	22	28	0.79	-31
27	CEFOR Antonio Leaño	14	38	0.37	-99

Last updated: May 6, 2019
Source: Liga TDP
P = Position; G = Games played; Pts = Points; Pts/G = Ratio of points to games played; GD = Goal difference

=== Playoffs ===
Round of 16
1	Juárez	4	0	0
16	Atlante	1	0	1
7	Correcaminos	1	1	2
10	Tigres UANL	0	3	3
4	Atlas	0	2	2
13	Celaya	1	0	1
5	Monterrey (p.)	1	2	3(3)
12	Universidad del Fútbol	3	0	3(2)
2	Pumas UNAM (p.)	3	1	4(11)
15	Leones Negros	1	3	4(10)
8	E.F. Chivas	1	2	3
9	Tijuana	2	0	2
3	Mineros de Zacatecas	1	2	3
14	Tecos	2	0	2
6	Guadalajara	4	4	8
11	Alebrijes de Oaxaca	0	0	0

Quarter-finals
1	Juárez	0	1	1
10	Tigres UANL	0	0	0
4	Atlas	0	1	1
5	Monterrey	1	1	2
2	Pumas UNAM	3	4	7
8	E.F. Chivas	3	2	5
3	Mineros de Zacatecas	2	2	4
6	Guadalajara	1	2	3

Semi-finals
1	Juárez (p.)	0	2	2(4)
5	Monterrey	1	1	2(2)
2	Pumas UNAM	3	1	4
3	Mineros de Zacatecas	0	1	1

Final
1	Juárez	1	2	3
2	Pumas UNAM	3	2	5

==== Round of 16 ====
The first legs were played on 10 and 11 May, and the second legs will be played on 17, 18 and 19 May 2019.

Team 1	Agg.	Team 2	1st leg	2nd leg
Juárez	4–1	Atlante	4–1	0–0
Escuela de Fútbol Chivas	3–2	Tijuana	1–2	2–0
Mineros de Zacatecas	3–2	Tecos	1–2	2–0
Guadalajara	8–0	Alebrijes de Oaxaca	4–0	4–0
Pumas UNAM (pen.)	4–4 (11–10)	Leones Negros	3–1	1–3
Correcaminos UAT	2–3	Tigres UANL	1–0	1–3
Atlas	2–1	Celaya	0–1	2–0
Monterrey (pen.)	3–3 (3–2)	Universidad del Fútbol	1–3	2–0

All times are UTC−5 except for matches in Ciudad Juárez and Hermosillo.

===== First leg =====
10 May 2019	Universidad del Fútbol	3–1	Monterrey	Universidad del Fútbol
11:00	Nahuat 50'; Jiménez 73', 85'	Report	Benítez 17'	Stadium: San Agustín Tlaxiaca; Attendance: 100; Referee: Fernando Alexander Cruz Garatachea

10 May 2019	Celaya	1–0	Atlas	Celaya
16:00	Vargas 23'	Report		Stadium: Instituto Tecnológico de Celaya; Attendance: 100; Referee: René Paul Moreno López

10 May 2019	Tecos	2–1	Mineros de Zacatecas	Zapopan
18:00	Arellano 55'; Casillas 65'	Report	Morales 90+7'	Stadium: Estadio Tres de Marzo; Attendance: 500; Referee: Marco Claudio Rodríguez Deras

10 May 2019	Tijuana	2–1	Escuela de Fútbol Chivas	Hermosillo
19:00 UTC -7	Baylón 8'; Miranda 83'	Report	Cervantes 63'	Stadium: Estadio Miguel Castro Servín; Attendance: 1,000; Referee: Iván Alberto Castro Zamora

11 May 2019	Tigres UANL	0–1	Correcaminos UAT	General Zuazua
10:00		Report	Martínez 34'	Stadium: Instalaciones de Zuazua; Attendance: 50; Referee: Lizzet Amairany García Olvera

11 May 2019	Leones Negros	1–3	Pumas UNAM	Zapopan
11:00	Dávalos 61'	Report	Morales 7'; Rodríguez 21', 58'	Stadium: Club La Primavera; Attendance: 50; Referee: Fabián Lechuga Chavarría

11 May 2019	Atlante	1–4	Juárez	Tultitlán
12:00	Leyva 84'	Report	Zapata 1', 3'; Alderete 7', 90'	Stadium: Nuevo Territorio Azulgrana; Attendance: 200; Referee: Marco Antonio Návez Hernández

11 May 2019	Alebrijes de Oaxaca	0–4	Guadalajara	Oaxaca
17:00		Report	Corona 17', 52'; Parra 20', 29'	Stadium: Estadio Tecnológico de Oaxaca; Attendance: 1,000; Referee: Omar Alejandro González Arizmendi

===== Second leg =====
17 May 2019	Guadalajara	4–0 (8–0 agg.)	Alebrijes de Oaxaca	Zapopan
10:00	Gómez 8', 48'} Organista 13'; García 45'	Report		Stadium: Verde Valle; Attendance: 50; Referee: Julio César Gil Jiménez

17 May 2019	Atlas	2–0 (2–1 agg.)	Celaya	El Salto
11:00	Nava 25'; Garibay 43'	Report		Stadium: Instalaciones CECAF; Attendance: 100; Referee: José Luis Alba Dorado

17 May 2019	Monterrey	2–0 (3–3 agg.) (3–2 p)	Universidad del Fútbol	Santiago
15:30	Ávila 74'; Zapata 81'	Report		Stadium: Estadio El Barrial; Attendance: 100; Referee: Noe Heriberto Vicencio Monsivais

18 May 2019	Correcaminos UAT	1–3 (2–3 agg.)	Tigres UANL	Ciudad Victoria
10:00	Loera 22'	Report	Suárez 6'; Corona 89'; Treviño 90+1'	Stadium: Cefor Club Correcaminos UAT; Attendance: 150; Referee: Pedro Hernández García

18 May 2019	Juárez	0–0 (4–1 agg.)	Atlante	Ciudad Juárez
11:00 UTC -6		Report		Stadium: Complejo de Entrenamiento Bravo; Attendance: 120; Referee: Adrián Alberto Gutiérrez Ibarra

18 May 2019	Mineros de Zacatecas	2–0 (3–2 agg.)	Tecos	Guadalupe
12:00	Morales 37'; Pedraza 72'	Report		Stadium: Unidad Deportiva Guadalupe; Attendance: 300; Referee: Jorge Alfonso Reséndiz Espinoza

18 May 2019	Escuela de Fútbol Chivas	2–0 (3–2 agg.)	Tijuana	Guadalajara
12:30	Rodríguez 36'; Morales 65'	Report		Stadium: Club Chivas San Rafael; Attendance: 200; Referee: Naím Alfonso Vargas Gil

19 May 2019	Pumas UNAM	1–3 (4–4 agg.) (11–10 p)	Leones Negros	Toluca
11:30	Morales 82'	Report	Díaz 17'; Murillo 40', 73'	Stadium: Instalaciones FMF – Cancha 3 Attendance: 200; Referee: Juan Alberto Ramírez Meza

==== Quarter-finals ====
The first legs were played on 22 and 23 May, and the second legs were played on 25 and 26 May 2019.

Team 1	Agg.	Team 2	1st leg	2nd leg
Juárez	1–0	Tigres UANL	0–0	1–0
Pumas UNAM	7–5	E.F. Chivas	3–3	4–2
Mineros de Zacatecas	4–3	Guadalajara	2–1	2–2
Atlas	1–2	Monterrey	0–1	1–1

All times are UTC−5 except for match in Ciudad Juárez.

===== First leg =====
22 May 2019	Guadalajara	1–2	Mineros de Zacatecas	Zapopan
10:00	Organista 11'	Report	González 86'; Morales 90+2'	Stadium: Verde Valle; Attendance: 50; Referee: Elton Yael Hernández Barrientos

22 May 2019	E.F. Chivas	3–3	Pumas UNAM	Guadalajara
11:00	Covarrubias 18'; Rangel 27'; Rodríguez 90+3'	Report	Morales 31', 38'; Suárez 69'	Stadium: Club Chivas San Rafael; Attendance: 100; Referee: Miguel Ángel Anaya Suárez

23 May 2019	Tigres UANL	0–0	Juárez	General Zuazua
10:00		Report		Stadium: Instalaciones de Zuazua; Attendance: 50; Referee: Donnet Steffy Molina Sánchez

23 May 2019	Monterrey	1–0	Atlas	Santiago
11:30	Pineda 83'	Report		Stadium: Estadio El Barrial; Attendance: 100; Referee: Juan Jesús Selvera Parada

===== Second leg =====
25 May 2019	Pumas UNAM	4–2 (7–5 agg.)	E.F. Chivas	Mexico City
10:00	Morales 21', 32'; Segovia 59'; García 76'	Report	Rangel 23', 89'	Stadium: La Cantera - Cancha 2 Attendance: 300; Referee: Omar Alejandro González Arizmendi

25 May 2019	Mineros de Zacatecas	2–2 (4–3 agg.)	Guadalajara	Guadalupe
11:00	Pedraza 7', 39'	Report	Organista 37'; Carrillo 84'	Stadium: Unidad Deportiva Guadalupe; Attendance: 100; Referee: Edwin Eduardo Morfín Verduzco

26 May 2019	Atlas	1–1 (1–2 agg.)	Monterrey	El Salto
10:00	Chávez 56'	Report	Pineda 31'	Stadium: Instalaciones CECAF; Attendance: 200; Referee: Martín Gerardo Juárez Jiménez

26 May 2019	Juárez	1–0 (1–0 agg.)	Tigres UANL	Ciudad Juárez
11:00 UTC -6	Mauri 19'	Report		Stadium: Complejo de Entrenamiento Bravo; Attendance: 500; Referee: Diego Armando Rosales Palacios

==== Semi-finals ====
The first legs will be played on 29 and 30 May 2019, and the second legs will be played on 1 and 2 June 2019.

Team 1	Agg.	Team 2	1st leg	2nd leg
Juárez (pen.)	2–2 (4–2)	Monterrey	0–1	2–1
Pumas UNAM	4–1	Mineros de Zacatecas	3–0	1–1

All times are UTC−5 except for match in Ciudad Juárez.

===== First leg =====
29 May 2019	Mineros de Zacatecas	0–3	Pumas UNAM	Guadalupe
11:00		Report	Barragán 4'; Segovia 55'; Escobedo 88'	Stadium: Unidad Deportiva Guadalupe; Attendance: 300; Referee: Hector Salvador Solorio Arreola

30 May 2019	Monterrey	1–0	Juárez	Santiago
10:00	Ávila 80'	Report		Stadium: Estadio El Barrial; Attendance: 30; Referee: Juan Rafael Canales Sánchez

===== Second leg =====
1 June 2019	Pumas UNAM	1–1 (4–1 agg.)	Mineros de Zacatecas	Mexico City
10:00	Ledón 15'	Report	Dorado 61'	Stadium: La Cantera - Cancha 2 Attendance: 400; Referee: Tomoya Suzuki

2 June 2019	Juárez	2–1 (2–2 agg.) (4–2 p)	Monterrey	Ciudad Juárez
11:00 UTC−6	Mendoza 53'; Alderete 65'	Report	Rivas 33'	Stadium: Complejo de Entrenamiento Bravo; Attendance: 350; Referee: Luis Carlos Caro Rodríguez

==== Final ====
The first leg was played on 6 June, and the second leg was played on 9 June 2019.

Team 1	Agg.	Team 2	1st leg	2nd leg
Juárez	3–5	Pumas UNAM	1–3	2–2

===== First leg =====
6 June 2019	Pumas UNAM	3–1	Juárez	Mexico City
11:00	Ledón 15'; Segovia 52', 59'	Report	Zapata 90+3'	Stadium: La Cantera - Cancha 2 Attendance: 300; Referee: Edson Enrique Castañón Ramírez

===== Second leg =====
9 June 2019	Juárez	2–2 (3–5 agg.)	Pumas UNAM	Ciudad Juárez
11:00 UTC−6	Alderete 30'; Zapata 57'	Report	Morales 5'; Barragán 21'	Stadium: Complejo de Entrenamiento Bravo; Attendance: 8,000; Referee: Héctor Salvador Solorio Arreola

2018-2019 winners:

2nd title

== Regular season statistics ==
=== Top goalscorers ===
Players sorted first by goals scored, then by last name.

Rank	Player	Club	Goals
1	(Mexico) Alan Delgado	Aragón F.C.	61
2	(Mexico) Juan Carlos Peña	Aguacateros CDU Uruapan	36
3	(Mexico) Eliud Sáenz	Saltillo Soccer	34
4	(Mexico) Carlos Alexis López	Atlético San Francisco	31
4	(Mexico) Samuel Andani González	Atlético Estado de México	31
6	(Mexico) Sergio Alexander Hipólito	Felinos 48	30
6	(Mexico) Elihu de Jesús Bocardo	Unión León	30
8	(Mexico) Bryan Mota	Aguacateros CDU Uruapan	28
8	(Mexico) Daniel Blanco	Bravos de Nuevo Laredo	28
8	(Mexico) Víctor Hugo Guerra	Delfines UGM	28

Last updated on May 6, 2019.
Source: LigaTDP

== See also ==
- Liga TDP
