= 2021–22 Serie B de México season =

Serie B de México
- Season: 2021–22
- Champions: Apertura: Aguacateros CDU (1st title); Clausura: Aguacateros CDU (2nd title)
- Matches: 98
- Goals: 367 (3.74 per match)
- Top goalscorer: Apertura: Bryan Mota (17 goals); Clausura: Juan Carlos Peña (14 goals)
- Biggest home win: Apertura: Aguacateros CDU 6–0 Huracanes Izcalli (4 December 2021); Clausura: Aguacateros CDU 8–0 Lobos Huerta (12 March 2022)
- Biggest away win: Apertura: Guerreros de Xico 0–6 Aguacateros CDU (18 September 2021); Ciervos 2–8 Aguacateros CDU (13 November 2021); Clausura: Guerreros de Xico 0–5 Alebrijes de Oaxaca (8 April 2022)
- Highest scoring: Apertura: Ciervos 3–7 Cuautla (23 October 2021); Ciervos 2–8 Aguacateros CDU (13 November 2021); Clausura: Aguacateros CDU 8–0 Lobos Huerta (12 March 2022); Aguacateros CDU 7–1 Ciervos (26 March 2022)
- Longest winning run: Apertura:6 matches Alebrijes de Oaxaca; Clausura:5 matches Aguacateros CDU
- Longest unbeaten run: Apertura:8 matches Alebrijes de Oaxaca; Clausura:11 matches Alebrijes de Oaxaca
- Longest winless run: Apertura:14 matches Guerreros de Xico; Clausura:12 matches Guerreros de Xico
- Longest losing run: Apertura:14 matches Guerreros de Xico; Clausura:7 matches Guerreros de Xico
- Highest attendance: Apertura: 600; Cuautla vs Alebrijes de Oaxaca (19 September 2021); Aguacateros CDU vs Alebrijes de Oaxaca (20 November 2021); Clausura: 500; Aguacateros CDU vs Guerreros de Xico (15 January 2022); Calor vs Alebrijes de Oaxaca (25 March 2022)
- Lowest attendance: Apertura: 20; Guerreros de Xico vs Lobos Huerta (10 November 2021); 50; Huracanes Izcalli vs Calor (12 February 2022)
- Total attendance: Apertura: 8,805; Clausura: 5,315
- Average attendance: Apertura: 220; Clausura: 144
- Stats are from the regular season only

The 2021–22 Liga Premier de México season was part of the third-tier football league of Mexico. The tournament began on 18 September 2021.

== Offseason changes ==
- Since 2021–22 season, the season will once again be divided into two tournaments: Apertura and Clausura.
- Calor returned from hiatus for 2021–22 season, after last season was on hiatus due to COVID-19.
- Aguacateros CDU returns to Serie B after an invite to participate in Serie A for the 2020–21 season when Serie B was suspended. Also Ciervos and Cuautla returns to Serie B.
- On July 30, 2021, Alebrijes de Oaxaca, Ángeles Morelos, Guerreros de Xico, Huracanes Izcalli and Lobos Huerta joined the league as expansion teams.
- On August 8, 2021, Aragón F.C. announced that it will not participate in the season for administrative reasons, the team had been announced as a new participant on July 30, 2021.
- On September 10, 2021, Ángeles SUD F.C. Morelos was put on hiatus.

== Teams ==
Location of teams in the 2021–22 Serie B

Club	Manager	City	Stadium	Capacity	Affiliate
Aguacateros CDU	(Mexico) José Roberto Muñoz	Uruapan, Michoacán	Unidad Deportiva Hermanos López Rayón	5,000	—
Alebrijes de Oaxaca	(Mexico) Isaac Martínez	Oaxaca City, Oaxaca	Tecnológico de Oaxaca	14,598	Alebrijes de Oaxaca
Calor	(Mexico) Pedro Muñoz	Monclova, Coahuila	Unidad Deportiva Nora Leticia Rocha	5,000	—
Ciervos	(Mexico) Pablo Robles	Chalco de Díaz Covarrubias, State of Mexico	Arreola	3,217	—
Cuautla	(Mexico) Alexis Bañuelos	Cuautla, Morelos	Isidro Gil Tapia	5,000	—
Guerreros de Xico	(Mexico) Miguel Ángel Limón	Iztacalco, Mexico City	Jesús Martínez "Palillo" (Note: Although the club registered the Estadio Jesús Martínez "Palillo" as its official field, the team plays several of its matches at the Estadio Arreola.)	6,000	—
Huracanes Izcalli	(Mexico) Antonio Gutiérrez	Cuautitlán Izcalli, State of Mexico	Hugo Sánchez Márquez (Note: Although the club registered the Estadio Hugo Sánchez Márquez as its official field, the team moved to Estadio Arreola for Clausura 2022.)	3,500	—
Lobos Huerta	(Mexico) José Julio Huerta	Cuautitlán Izcalli, State of Mexico	Hugo Sánchez Márquez (Note: Although the club registered the Estadio Hugo Sánchez Márquez as its official field, the team moved to Deportivo Cartagena for Clausura 2022.)	3,500	—

== Torneo Apertura ==
=== Standings ===
Pos	Team	Pld	W	D	L	GF	GA	GD	Pts	Qualification or relegation
1	Aguacateros CDU (C)	14	10	2	2	49	9	+40	35	Liguilla
2	Alebrijes de Oaxaca	14	10	1	3	30	18	+12	33	Liguilla
3	Cuautla (Note: C.D. Cuautla was excluded from the tournament play-offs due to failure to pay its obligations as an affiliate of the Liga Premier FMF.)	14	8	5	1	34	15	+19	32	
4	Calor	14	8	1	5	35	15	+20	28	Liguilla
5	Lobos Huerta	14	5	3	6	24	34	−10	20	2021–22 Copa Conecta
6	Ciervos	14	4	1	9	23	40	−17	15	2021–22 Copa Conecta
7	Huracanes Izcalli	14	4	1	9	16	35	−19	14	2021–22 Copa Conecta
8	Guerreros de Xico	14	0	0	14	5	50	−45	0	2021–22 Copa Conecta

Updated to match(es) played on 5 December 2021. Source: Liga Premier FMF
(C) Champions

=== Positions by round ===
Qualification to semi-finals
Last place in table

Team ╲ Round	1	2	3	4	5	6	7	8	9	10	11	12	13	14
Aguacateros CDU (Note: Pending match against Cuautla (between Weeks 3 and 5))	1	1	1	1	1	1	2	1	1	1	1	1	1	1
Alebrijes de Oaxaca	7	3	2	3	2	2	1	2	2	2	2	2	2	2
Cuautla (Note: Pending matches against Aguacateros CDU (between Weeks 3 and 5) and Guerreros de Xico (between Weeks 4 and 14))	2	2	5	5	6	5	3	4	3	4	3	4	3	3
Calor	5	7	4	4	4	4	5	3	4	3	5	3	4	4
Lobos Huerta	3	6	3	2	3	3	4	5	5	5	4	5	5	5
Ciervos	4	5	7	7	5	6	6	6	7	7	7	7	6	6
Huracanes Izcalli	6	4	6	6	7	7	7	7	6	6	6	6	7	7
Guerreros de Xico (Note: Pending match against Cuautla (between Weeks 4 and 14))	8	8	8	8	8	8	8	8	8	8	8	8	8	8

Updated to match(es) played on 5 December 2021. Source: Liga Premier FMF

=== Results ===
Home \ Away	ADU	ALE	CAL	CIE	CUA	GUE	HUR	LHU
Aguacateros CDU	—	4–0	3–2	4–0	0–0	5–0	6–0	6–1
Alebrijes de Oaxaca	1–0	—	2–1	3–0	1–1	3–1	2–0	4–0
Calor	2–1	1–2	—	4–0	1–1	2–0	4–1	5–0
Ciervos	2–8	1–2	0–3	—	3–7	5–0	1–0	3–0
Cuautla	0–3	4–2	2–1	4–1	—	3–0	3–0	1–1
Guerreros de Xico	0–6	0–3	1–4	0–3	0–3	—	0–3	1–4
Huracanes Izcalli	1–1	3–1	0–4	3–2	1–4	2–0	—	0–3
Lobos Huerta	0–2	2–4	2–1	2–2	1–1	4–2	4–2	—

Updated to match(es) played on 5 December 2021. Source: Liga Premier FMF
Legend: Blue = home team win; Yellow = draw; Red = away team win.

=== Regular season statistics ===
==== Top goalscorers ====
Players sorted first by goals scored, then by last name.

Rank	Player	Club	Goals
1	(Mexico) Bryan Mota	Aguacateros CDU	17
2	(Mexico) Raúl Magallón	Calor	15
3	(Mexico) Julio Ibarra	Ciervos	9
4	(Mexico) Joel Robinson	Calor	8
4	(Mexico) Juan Carlos Peña	Aguacateros CDU	8
4	(Mexico) Daniel Rodríguez	Lobos Huerta	8
7	(Mexico) Suker Estrada	Cuautla	7
8	(Mexico) Juan David Flores	Cuautla	6
8	(Mexico) Daniel Guzmán	Alebrijes de Oaxaca	6
8	(Mexico) Osiel Herrera	Alebrijes de Oaxaca	6
8	(Mexico) Aldo Suárez	Cuautla	6

Source:Liga Premier FMF

==== Hat-tricks ====
Player	For	Against	Result	Date	Round	Reference
(Mexico) Bryan Mota	Aguacateros CDU	Guerreros de Xico	0 – 6 (A)	18 September 2021	1	
(Mexico) Bryan Mota	Aguacateros CDU	Ciervos	4 – 0 (H)	9 October 2021	4	
(Mexico) Raúl Magallón	Calor	Lobos Huerta	5 – 0 (H)	29 October 2021	8	
(Mexico) Bryan Mota	Ciervos	Aguacateros CDU	2 – 8 (A)	13 November 2021	11	
(Mexico) Francisco Flores	Ciervos	Aguacateros CDU	2 – 8 (A)	13 November 2021	11	
(Mexico) Juan Carlos Peña	Aguacateros CDU	Alebrijes de Oaxaca	4 – 0 (H)	20 November 2021	12	
(Mexico) Raúl Magallón	Calor	Guerreros de Xico	4 – 1 (A)	4 December 2021	14	

(H) – Home; (A) – Away

=== Attendance ===
==== Per team ====
	Home match played behind closed doors
	Away match
	Highest attended match
	Lowest attended match
	Match canceled
PPD	Match postponed

Team	Week														Total Att	Avg.	Total Pld
Team	1	2	3	4	5	6	7	8	9	10	11	12	13	14	Total Att	Avg.	Total Pld
Aguacateros CDU		200		500		500		500		200		600		300	2800	400	7
Alebrijes de Oaxaca		50	30		100		100	50			200		50		580	83	7
Calor		400		150	200		300	50		300			200		1600	229	7
Ciervos	0		25		50		250		50		50		50		475	79	6
Cuautla	600					500			500		500	500		0	2600	520	5
Guerreros de Xico	100			30		100			30	20		50		50	380	54	7
Huracanes Izcalli		200		250			200	0		0		0	0		650	217	3
Lobos Huerta	0		0		0	100			0		0			0	100	100	1
Total	700	850	55	930	350	1200	850	600	580	520	750	1,150	300	0	9185	214	43

Source: Liga Premier FMF

==== Highest and lowest ====
Highest attended					Lowest attended			
Week	Home	Score	Away	Attendance	Home	Score	Away	Attendance
1	Cuautla	4–2	Alebrijes de Oaxaca	600	Guerreros de Xico	0–6	Aguacateros CDU	100
2	Calor	1–1	Cuautla	400	Alebrijes de Oaxaca	3–0	Ciervos	50
3	Alebrijes de Oaxaca	2–0	Huracanes Izcalli	30	Ciervos	0–3	Calor	25
4	Aguacateros CDU	4–0	Ciervos	500	Guerreros de Xico	0–3	Cuautla	30
5	Calor	4–1	Huracanes Izcalli	200	Ciervos	5–0	Guerreros de Xico	50
6	Aguacateros CDU	3–2	Calor	500	Guerreros de Xico	0–3	Alebrijes de Oaxaca	100
7	Calor	2–0	Guerreros de Xico	300	Alebrijes de Oaxaca	4–0	Lobos Huerta	100
8	Aguacateros CDU	5–0	Guerreros de Xico	500	Calor	5–0	Lobos Huerta	50
9	Cuautla	2–1	Calor	500	Guerreros de Xico	0–3	Huracanes Izcalli	30
10	Calor	4–0	Ciervos	300	Guerreros de Xico	1–4	Lobos Huerta	20
11	Cuautla	3–0	Guerreros de Xico	500	Ciervos	2–8	Aguacateros CDU	50
12	Aguacateros CDU	4–0	Alebrijes de Oaxaca	600	Guerreros de Xico	0–3	Ciervos	50
13	Calor	2–1	Aguacateros CDU	200	Ciervos	3–0	Lobos Huerta	50
14	Aguacateros CDU	6–0	Huracanes Izcalli	300	Guerreros de Xico	1–4	Calor	50

Source: Liga Premier FMF

1. Does not include matches played behind closed doors.

=== Liguilla ===
The four best teams play two games against each other on a home-and-away basis. The higher seeded teams play on their home field during the second leg. The winner of each match up is determined by aggregate score. In the semifinals, if the two teams are tied on aggregate the higher seeded team advances. In the final, if the two teams are tied after both legs, the match goes to extra time and, if necessary, a penalty shoot-out.

Semi–finals
1	Aguacateros CDU (Note: Aguacateros CDU was qualified directly to the final for his best average in the season, this after the exclusion of C.D. Cuautla of the play–offs.)
2	Alebrijes de Oaxaca	1	0	1 (3)
3	Calor (p.)	1	0	1 (4)

Final
1	Aguacateros CDU	0	2	2
3	Calor	0	1	1

==== Semi-final ====
The first leg was played on 10 December, and the second leg was played on 13 December 2021.

Team 1	Agg.	Team 2	1st leg	2nd leg
Alebrijes de Oaxaca	1–1 (3–4)	(p.) Calor	1–1	0–0

===== First leg =====
10 December 2021	Calor	1–1	Alebrijes de Oaxaca	Monclova, Coahuila
19:30 CST (UTC−6)	Díaz 67'	Report	Guzmán 51'	Stadium: Ciudad Deportiva Nora Leticia Rocha; Attendance: 500; Referee: Oscar Javier Ramírez Flores

===== Second leg =====
13 December 2021	Alebrijes de Oaxaca	0–0 (1–1 agg.) (3–4 p)	Calor	Oaxaca City, Oaxaca
18:30 CST (UTC−6)		Report		Stadium: Estadio Tecnológico de Oaxaca; Attendance: 600; Referee: Rafael Bonilla Vargas

==== Final ====
The first leg was played on 16 December, and the second leg was played on 19 December 2021.

Team 1	Agg.	Team 2	1st leg	2nd leg
Aguacateros CDU	2–1	Calor	0–0	2–1

===== First leg =====
16 December 2021	Calor	0–0	Aguacateros CDU	Monclova, Coahuila
19:30 CST (UTC−6)		Report		Stadium: Ciudad Deportiva Nora Leticia Rocha; Attendance: 1,300; Referee: Julio César Gil Jiménez

===== Second leg =====
19 December 2021	Aguacateros CDU	2–1 (2–1 agg.)	Calor	Uruapan, Michoacán
15:00 CST (UTC−6)	Mota 76'; Peña 99'	Report	Magallón 63'	Stadium: Unidad Deportiva Hermanos López Rayón; Attendance: 2,500; Referee: Rafael Bonilla Vargas

Apertura 2021 winners

1st title

== Torneo Clausura ==
The Torneo Clausura began on 14 January 2022.

=== Season changes ===
- On February 15, 2022 C.D. Cuautla was excluded from the competition for not paying the debts to the league and the football federation, so it does not take part in the Clausura 2022 tournament.

=== Standings ===
Pos	Team	Pld	W	D	L	GF	GA	GD	Pts	Qualification or relegation
1	Aguacateros CDU (C)	12	8	3	1	41	12	+29	31	Liguilla
2	Alebrijes de Oaxaca	12	7	4	1	30	12	+18	27	Liguilla
3	Huracanes Izcalli	12	7	3	2	26	18	+8	27	Liguilla
4	Calor	12	7	3	2	26	8	+18	26	Liguilla
5	Lobos Huerta	12	3	0	9	14	30	−16	9	
6	Ciervos	12	2	2	8	12	32	−20	9	
7	Guerreros de Xico	12	0	1	11	2	39	−37	1	

Updated to match(es) played on 23 April 2022. Source: Liga Premier FMF
(C) Champions

=== Positions by round ===
Qualification to semi-finals
Last place in table

Team ╲ Round	1	2	3	4	5	6	7	8	9	10	11	12	13	14
Aguacateros CDU	1	1	1	1	1	1	1	1†	1	1	1	1	1	1†
Alebrijes de Oaxaca	3†	4	5	4	3	4†	4	4	3	4	2	2	2	2
Huracanes Izcalli	5	3	4	2†	5	3	3	2	2	2	4†	4	3	3
Calor	2	2	2	5	2	2	2†	3	4	3	3	3	4†	4
Lobos Huerta	6	6	6†	6	6	6	6	6	6	6†	6	6	6	5
Ciervos	4	5	3	3	4†	5	5	5	5	5	5	5†	5	6
Guerreros de Xico	7	7†	7	7	7	7	7	7	7†	7	7	7	7	7

Updated to match(es) played on 23 April 2022. Source: Liga Premier FMF

NOTE: Weeks 2 and 3 of the tournament were postponed due to administrative issues and COVID-19, so in practice they were played like weeks 13 and 14 of the tournament.

=== Results ===
Home \ Away	ADU	ALE	CAL	CIE	GUE	HUR	LHU
Aguacateros CDU	—	2–2	0–1	7–1	7–0	3–1	8–0
Alebrijes de Oaxaca	2–2	—	1–1	1–0	6–0	3–3	1–0
Calor	1–2	1–2	—	3–0	2–0	5–0	5–1
Ciervos	1–3	0–5	1–1	—	1–1	1–2	2–1
Guerreros de Xico	0–3	0–5	0–3	0–4	—	0–4	0–1
Huracanes Izcalli	2–2	2–0	1–1	3–1	1–0	—	5–1
Lobos Huerta	1–2	1–2	0–2	5–0	2–1	1–2	—

Updated to match(es) played on 23 April 2022. Source: Liga Premier FMF
Legend: Blue = home team win; Yellow = draw; Red = away team win.

=== Regular season statistics ===
==== Top goalscorers ====
Players sorted first by goals scored, then by last name.

Rank	Player	Club	Goals
1	(Mexico) Juan Carlos Peña	Aguacateros CDU	14
2	(Mexico) Raymundo Mejía	Huracanes Izcalli	10
3	(Mexico) Eduardo Banda	Alebrijes de Oaxaca	9
4	(Mexico) Raúl Magallón	Calor	7
4	(Mexico) Daniel Rodríguez	Lobos Huerta	7
4	(Mexico) Eliseo Toledo	Alebrijes de Oaxaca	7
7	(Mexico) Eduardo Díaz	Calor	5
7	(Mexico) Francisco Flores	Aguacateros CDU	5
7	(Mexico) Bryan Mota	Aguacateros CDU	5
7	(Mexico) Dante Narváez	Huracanes Izcalli	5
7	(Mexico) Edgar Olvera	Lobos Huerta	5

Source:Liga Premier FMF

==== Hat-tricks ====
Player	For	Against	Result	Date	Round	Reference
(Mexico) Juan Carlos Peña	Aguacateros CDU	Lobos Huerta	8 – 0 (H)	12 March 2022	9	
(Mexico) Juan Carlos Peña	Aguacateros CDU	Ciervos	7 – 1 (H)	26 March 2022	11	
(Mexico) Raymundo Mejía	Huracanes Izcalli	Lobos Huerta	5 – 1 (H)	26 March 2022	11	
(Mexico) Daniel Áxel Rodríguez	Lobos Huerta	Ciervos	5 – 0 (H)	8 April 2022	13	

(H) – Home; (A) – Away

=== Attendance ===
==== Per team ====
Pos	Team	Total	High	Low	Average	Change
1	Aguacateros CDU	2,250	500	300	375	−6.2%
2	Calor	1,500	500	100	250	+9.2%
3	Ciervos	400	100	50	80	+1.3%
4	Alebrijes de Oaxaca	350	100	25	67	−19.3%
5	Lobos Huerta	175	100	25	58	−42.0%
6	Huracanes Izcalli	330	80	50	55	−74.7%
7	Guerreros de Xico	310	100	30	52	−3.7%
	League total	5,315	500	25	144	−32.7%

Source: Liga Premier FMF
Notes:
Only regular season listed

==== Highest and lowest ====
Highest attended					Lowest attended			
Week	Home	Score	Away	Attendance	Home	Score	Away	Attendance
1	Aguacateros CDU	7–0	Guerreros de Xico	500	Huracanes Izcalli	3–1	Ciervos	50
2	Guerreros de Xico	0–4	Huracanes Izcalli	50	Lobos Huerta	1–2	Aguacateros CDU	50
3	Calor	3–0	Ciervos	300	Guerreros de Xico	0–1	Lobos Huerta	30
4	Ciervos	1–3	Aguacateros CDU	100	Alebrijes de Oaxaca	1–1	Calor	50
5	Aguacateros CDU	2–2	Alebrijes de Oaxaca	300	Huracanes Izcalli	1–1	Calor	50
6	Calor	1–2	Aguacateros CDU	200	Ciervos	2–1	Lobos Huerta	50
7	Aguacateros CDU	3–1	Huracanes Izcalli	300	Guerreros de Xico	0–3	Calor	50
8	Guerreros de Xico	0–3	Aguacateros CDU	100	Ciervos	1–2	Huracanes Izcalli	100
9	Aguacateros CDU	8–0	Lobos Huerta	450	Huracanes Izcalli	1–0	Guerreros de Xico	50
10	Alebrijes de Oaxaca	3–3	Huracanes Izcalli	50	N/A			
11	Calor	1–2	Alebrijes de Oaxaca	500	Huracanes Izcalli	5–1	Lobos Huerta	50
12	Calor	5–0	Huracanes Izcalli	100	Alebrijes de Oaxaca	2–2	Aguacateros CDU	50
13	Aguacateros CDU	0–1	Calor	400	Lobos Huerta	5–0	Ciervos	25
14	Calor	2–0	Guerreros de Xico	200	Huracanes Izcalli	2–2	Aguacateros CDU	50

Source: Liga Premier FMF

1. Does not include matches played behind closed doors.

=== Liguilla ===
The four best teams play two games against each other on a home-and-away basis. The higher seeded teams play on their home field during the second leg. The winner of each match up is determined by aggregate score. In the semifinals, if the two teams are tied on aggregate the higher seeded team advances. In the final, if the two teams are tied after both legs, the match goes to extra time and, if necessary, a penalty shoot-out.

Semi–finals
1	Aguacateros CDU	0	4	4
4	Calor	0	0	0
2	Alebrijes de Oaxaca	1	1	2
3	Huracanes Izcalli	1	0	1

Final
1	Aguacateros CDU	0	4	4
2	Alebrijes de Oaxaca	1	1	2

==== Semi-finals ====
The first legs will be played on 29 and 30 April, and the second legs will be played on 6 and 7 May 2022.

Team 1	Agg.	Team 2	1st leg	2nd leg
Aguacateros CDU	4–0	Calor	0–0	4–0
Alebrijes de Oaxaca	2–1	Huracanes Izcalli	1–1	1–0

===== First leg =====
29 April 2022	Calor	0–0	Aguacateros CDU	Monclova, Coahuila
20:15 CDT (UTC−5)		Report		Stadium: Ciudad Deportiva Nora Leticia Rocha; Attendance: 300; Referee: Julio César Gil Jiménez

30 April 2022	Huracanes Izcalli	1–1	Alebrijes de Oaxaca	Chalco, State of Mexico
16:00 CDT (UTC−5)	López 42'	Report	Choreño 28'	Stadium: Estadio Arreola; Attendance: 50; Referee: Rodrigo Ramos Romo

===== Second leg =====
6 May 2022	Alebrijes de Oaxaca	1–0 (2–1 agg.)	Huracanes Izcalli	Oaxaca City, Oaxaca
16:00 CDT (UTC−5)	Choreño 17'	Report		Stadium: Estadio Tecnológico de Oaxaca; Attendance: 250; Referee: Rosario Guadalupe Cárdenas Morales

7 May 2022	Aguacateros CDU	4–0 (4–0 agg.)	Calor	Uruapan, Michoacán
16:00 CDT (UTC−5)	Valencia 29'; Flores 47'; Peña 69'; Quiróz 84'	Report		Stadium: Unidad Deportiva Hermanos López Rayón; Attendance: 2,000; Referee: Diego Gilberto Gurrea Mendoza

==== Final ====
The first leg were played on 14 May, and the second leg were played on 21 May 2022.

Team 1	Agg.	Team 2	1st leg	2nd leg
Aguacateros CDU	4–2	Alebrijes de Oaxaca	0–1	4–1

===== First leg =====
14 May 2022	Alebrijes de Oaxaca	1–0	Aguacateros CDU	Oaxaca City, Oaxaca
18:00 CDT (UTC−5)	Hurtado 39'	Report		Stadium: Estadio Tecnológico de Oaxaca; Attendance: 567; Referee: Jaime Orlando Montes Santos

===== Second leg =====
21 May 2022	Aguacateros CDU	4–1 (4–2 agg.)	Alebrijes de Oaxaca	Uruapan, Michoacán
16:00 CDT (UTC−5)	Barra 5'; Flores 19'; Quiróz 58'; Menera 84'	Report	Banda 11'	Stadium: Unidad Deportiva Hermanos López Rayón; Attendance: 2,800; Referee: Diego Alberto Gurrea Mendoza

Clausura 2022 winners

2nd title

== Coefficient table ==
P	Team	Pts	G	Pts/G	GD
1	Aguacateros CDU	66	26	2.538	+69
2	Alebrijes de Oaxaca	60	26	2.308	+30
3	Calor	54	26	2.077	+38
4	Huracanes Izcalli	41	26	1.577	–11
5	Lobos Huerta	29	26	1.115	–26
6	Ciervos	24	26	0.923	–39
7	Guerreros de Xico	1	26	0.038	–82

Last updated: April 23, 2022
Source: Liga Premier FMF
P = Position; G = Games played; Pts = Points; Pts/G = Ratio of points to games played; GD = Goal difference

== Promotion to Liga Premier – Serie A ==
As champion of the two tournaments of the season, Aguacateros CDU won the right to be promoted to Liga Premier – Serie A.

2021–22 winners

1st title

== See also ==
- 2021–22 Liga MX season
- 2021–22 Liga de Expansión MX season
- 2021–22 Serie A de México season
- 2021–22 Liga TDP season
