= 2021–22 Copa Conecta =

Tournament details
- Country: Mexico
- Dates: 14 December 2021 – 8 March 2022
- Teams: 32

Final positions
- Champions: Aguacateros de Peribán
- Runners-up: Muxes

The 2021–22 Copa Conecta was the 1st edition of the Copa Conecta, a knockout competition for Mexican football clubs from Liga Premier and Liga TDP.

The Copa Conecta is an official Mexican tournament that was created in 2021 with the aim of providing a greater opportunity for development to the football players of the Premier and TDP league teams.

== Qualified teams ==
Teams classified in position 5 to 8 of groups 1 and 2 of Serie A and Serie B at Torneo Apertura 2021.

- Ciervos (Serie B)
- Colima (Serie A – Group 1)
- Gavilanes de Matamoros (Serie A – Group 1)
- Guerreros de Xico (Serie B)
- Huracanes Izcalli (Serie B)
- Inter Querétaro (Serie A – Group 2)
- Lobos Huerta (Serie B)
- Montañeses (Serie A – Group 2)
- Sporting Canamy (Serie A – Group 2)
- Tecos (Serie A – Group 1)
- Tritones Vallarta (Serie A – Group 1)
- Zap (Serie A – Group 2)

Teams classified at the first place of the 17 groups of the Liga TDP and the top 3 classified in the league coefficient table.

- Aguacateros de Peribán (Liga TDP – Group 10)
- Alebrijes de Oaxaca (Liga TDP – Group 2)
- Aragón (Liga TDP – Group 4)
- Bombarderos de Tecámac (Liga TDP – Group 8)
- Catedráticos Elite (Liga TDP – Group 13)
- Cimarrones de Sonora (Liga TDP – Group 16)
- Deportiva Venados (Liga TDP – Group 1)
- Diablos Tesistán (Liga TDP – Group 14)
- Estudiantes del Oro (Liga TDP – Group 6)
- Estudiantes de Querétaro (Liga TDP – Group 9)
- Gorilas de Juanacatlán (Liga TDP – Group 12)
- Guerreros DD (Liga TDP – Group 5)
- Juárez (Liga TDP – Group 7)
- London (Liga TDP – Group 17)
- Muxes (Liga TDP – Group 4)
- Poza Rica (Liga TDP – Group 2)
- Saltillo Soccer (Liga TDP – Group 15)
- Titanes de Querétaro (Liga TDP – Group 9)
- Tuzos UAZ (Liga TDP – Group 11)
- Unión (Liga TDP – Group 5)

== Bracket ==
Round of 32
14 December
Muxes	4
Guerreros de Xico	0
15 December
Estudiantes del Oro	1 (9)
Huracanes Izcalli (p.)	1 (10)
15 December
Aragón	5
Ciervos	0
15 December
Unión	1 (2)
Lobos Huerta (p.)	1 (4)
16 December
Deportiva Venados	1
Poza Rica	0
16 December
Sporting Canamy	0
Montañeses	1
16 December
Juárez (p.)	1 (5)
Guerreros DD	1 (4)
15 December
Bombarderos de Tecámac	1
Alebrijes de Oaxaca	0
16 December
Saltillo Soccer	5
Tuzos UAZ	4
16 December
Gavilanes de Matamoros (p.)	1 (5)
Inter Querétaro	1 (4)
16 December
London	0
Cimarrones de Sonora	2
15 December
Catedráticos Elite	3 (2)
Diablos Tesistán (p.)	3 (4)
16 December
Estudiantes de Querétaro (p.)	0 (4)
Titanes de Querétaro	0 (2)
15 December
Aguacateros de Peribán (p.)	1 (5)
Gorilas de Juanacatlán	1 (4)
15 December
Zap	3
Colima	1
16 December
Tecos	3
Tritones Vallarta	2

Round of 16
26 January
Muxes	2
Huracanes Izcalli	0
W/o
Aragón (w)
Lobos Huerta
27 January
Deportiva Venados (p.)	1 (3)
Montañeses	1 (1)
2 February
Juárez	1
Bombarderos de Tecámac	0
2 February
Saltillo Soccer (p.)	0 (4)
Gavilanes de Matamoros	0 (2)
27 January
Cimarrones de Sonora	3
Diablos Tesistán	1
25 January
Estudiantes de Querétaro	0
Aguacateros de Peribán	4
25 January
Zap	1
Tecos	2

Quarter-finals
8 February
Muxes	2
Aragón	1
10 February
Deportiva Venados	3
Juárez	0
8 February
Saltillo Soccer	2
Cimarrones de Sonora	1
8 February
Aguacateros de Peribán (p.)	2 (4)
Tecos	2 (3)

Semi-finals
23 February
Muxes	2
Deportiva Venados	0
22 February
Saltillo Soccer	0
Aguacateros de Peribán	2

Final
10 March
Muxes	1 (5)
Aguacateros de Peribán (p.)	1 (6)

== Matches ==
=== Round of 32 ===
Team 1	Score	Team 2
Muxes	4–0	Guerreros de Xico
Aguacateros de Peribán (p.)	1–1 (5–4)	Gorilas de Juanacatlán
Bombarderos de Tecámac	1–0	Alebrijes de Oaxaca
Catedráticos Elite	3–3 (2–4)	(p.) Diablos Tesistán
Estudiantes del Oro	1–1 (9–10)	(p.) Huracanes Izcalli
Aragón	5–0	Ciervos
Zap	3–1	Colima
Unión	1–1 (2–4)	(p.) Lobos Huerta
Deportiva Venados	1–0	Poza Rica
Estudiantes de Querétaro (p.)	0–0 (4–2)	Titanes de Querétaro
Juárez (p.)	1–1 (5–4)	Guerreros DD
Gavilanes de Matamoros (p.)	1–1 (5–4)	Inter de Querétaro
London	0–2	Cimarrones de Sonora
Saltillo Soccer	5–4	Tuzos UAZ
Sporting Canamy	0–1	Montañeses
Tecos	3–2	Tritones Vallarta

14 December 2021	Muxes	4–0	Guerreros de Xico	Texcoco, State of Mexico
12:00 CST (UTC−6)	Cibrián 6'; Jiménez 24', 80'; Delgado 30'	Report		Stadium: Estadio Municipal Claudio Suárez; Attendance: 250; Referee: Diego Gilberto Gurrea Mendoza

15 December 2021	Unión	1–1 (2–4 p)	Lobos Huerta	Melchor Ocampo, State of Mexico
10:00 CST (UTC−6)	Orquiz 43'	Report	Robles 87' (own)	Stadium: Deportivo Municipal Melchor Ocampo; Attendance: 0 Referee: Jaime Orlando Montes Santos

15 December 2021	Bombarderos de Tecámac	1–0	Alebrijes de Oaxaca	Tecámac, State of Mexico
11:00 CST (UTC−6)	Sánchez 29'	Report		Stadium: Campo Galaxia del Llano; Attendance: 100; Referee: Edson Enrique Castañón Ramírez

15 December 2021	Aragón	5–0	Ciervos	Gustavo A. Madero, Mexico City
11:00 CST (UTC−6)	Camacho 46'; Márquez 73', 87', 88', 90'	Report		Stadium: Deportivo Francisco Zarco; Attendance: 100; Referee: Víctor Hugo Espinosa López

15 December 2021	Estudiantes del Oro	1–1 (9–10 p)	Huracanes Izcalli	El Oro, State of México
13:00 CST (UTC−6)	Seay 16'		Monroy 19'	Stadium: Estadio Jacinto Salinas "La Cabecilla"; Attendance: 100; Referee: Ignacio Góngora García

15 December 2021	Zap	3–1	Colima	Zapotlanejo, Jalisco
15:30 CST (UTC−6)	Chapa 10'; Mares 28'; Quintero 38'	Report	Molina 30'	Stadium: Estadio Miguel Hidalgo; Attendance: 100; Referee: José Luis Alba Dorado

15 December 2021	Catedráticos Elite	3–3 (2–4 p)	Diablos Tesistán	Etzatlán, Jalisco
15:50 CST (UTC−6)	Valdivia 12'; Parra 32'; Soltero 65'	Report	Godínez 10'; Cigarroa 62'; Gamboa 70'	Stadium: Unidad Deportiva de Etzatlán; Attendance: 50; Referee: Héctor Emilio Contreras Sotelo

15 December 2021	Aguacateros de Peribán	1–1 (5–4 p)	Gorilas de Juanacatlán	Peribán, Michoacán
16:00 CST (UTC−6)	Ayala 26'	Report	Coronado 42'	Stadium: Estadio Municipal de Peribán; Attendance: 600; Referee: Rosario Guadalupe Cárdenas Morales

16 December 2021	Juárez	1–1 (5–4 p)	Guerreros DD	Xochimilco, Mexico City
11:00 CST (UTC−6)	López 10'	Report	Escoto 5'	Stadium: Club Campestre Monte Sur; Attendance: 150; Referee: Carlos Iván Trejo Saldívar

16 December 2021	London	0–2	Cimarrones de Sonora	Tijuana, Baja California
12:00 PST (UTC−8)	Rodríguez 3'; González 87'	Report		Stadium: Unidad Deportiva CREA; Attendance: 50; Referee: Rodrigo Ramos Romo

16 December 2021	Deportiva Venados	1–0	Poza Rica	Tamanché, Yucatán
15:00 CST (UTC−6)	Ramírez 49'	Report		Stadium: Estadio Alonso Diego Molina; Attendance: 200; Referee: Edwin Eduardo Morfín Verduzco

16 December 2021	Sporting Canamy	0–1	Montañeses	Oaxtepec, Morelos
16:00 CST (UTC−6)		Report		Stadium: Estadio Centro Vacacional IMSS; Attendance: 50; Referee: Miguel Ángel Morales Sánchez
	Penalties
			López 65' (own)

16 December 2021	Gavilanes de Matamoros	1–1 (5–4 p)	Inter Querétaro	Matamoros, Tamaulipas
16:00 CST (UTC−6)	Amador 90'	Report	Castañeda 7'	Stadium: Estadio El Hogar; Attendance: 200; Referee: Kevin Kober Contreras Reyes

16 December 2021	Saltillo Soccer	5–4	Tuzos UAZ	Saltillo, Coahuila
18:00 CST (UTC−6)	Cerda 8'; Orellana 46'; Crespo 71'; Ramos 79'; Saavedra 85'	Report	Maldonado 17'; Torres 47', 82'; López 73'	Stadium: Estadio Olímpico Francisco I. Madero; Attendance: 500; Referee: Juan Daniel Peña Garza

16 December 2021	Estudiantes de Querétaro	0–0 (4–2 p)	Titanes de Querétaro	Querétaro City, Querétaro
19:00 CST (UTC−6)		Report		Stadium: Complejo Deportivo INDEREQ; Attendance: 100; Referee: José Maximiliano Negrete Preciado

16 December 2021	Tecos	3–2	Tritones Vallarta	Zapopan, Jalisco
19:00 CST (UTC−6)	Loreto 2'; Jacobo 3'; Ortíz 48'	Report	López 1'; Escalante 16'	Stadium: Estadio Tres de Marzo; Attendance: 100; Referee: Jorge López Hernández

=== Round of 16 ===
Team 1	Score	Team 2
Aragón (w)	–	Lobos Huerta
Juárez	1–0	Bombarderos de Tecámac
Estudiantes de Querétaro	0–4	Aguacateros de Peribán
Muxes	2–0	Huracanes Izcalli
Deportiva Venados (p.)	1–1 (3–1)	Montañeses
Zap	1–2	Tecos
Saltillo Soccer (p.)	0–0 (4–2)	Gavilanes de Matamoros
Cimarrones de Sonora	3–1	Diablos Tesistán

25 January 2022	Zap	1–2	Tecos	Zapotlanejo, Jalisco
15:30 CST (UTC−6)	Benítez 88'	Report	Casillas 61'; Rodríguez 79'	Stadium: Estadio Miguel Hidalgo; Attendance: 0 Referee: Mauricio Eleazar López Sánchez

25 January 2022	Estudiantes de Querétaro	0–4	Aguacateros de Peribán	Querétaro City, Querétaro
19:00 CST (UTC−6)		Report	Ayala 12', 80'; Martínez 16'; Pizano 54'	Stadium: Complejo Deportivo INDEREQ; Attendance: 30; Referee: Diego Gilberto Gurrea Mendoza

26 January 2022	Muxes	2–0	Huracanes Izcalli	Texcoco, State of Mexico
16:00 CST (UTC−6)	Marmolejo 48'; Cibrián 87'	Report		Stadium: Estadio Municipal Claudio Suárez; Attendance: 300; Referee: Ximena Márquez Ruiz

27 January 2022	Deportiva Venados	1–1 (3–1 p)	Montañeses	Tamanché, Yucatán
15:00 CST (UTC−6)	Briseño 4'	Report	Benítez 90'	Stadium: Estadio Alonso Diego Molina; Attendance: 250; Referee: Luis Enrique Zarco Cervantes

27 January 2022	Cimarrones de Sonora	3–1	Diablos Tesistán	Hermosillo, Sonora
15:00 MST (UTC−7)	Sánchez 19', 46'; Meléndez 69'	Report	Sanabria 88'	Stadium: Estadio Héroe de Nacozari; Attendance: 0 Referee: Rogelio Ernesto Aguilar Zamora

2 February 2022	Juárez	1–0	Bombarderos de Tecámac	Milpa Alta, Mexico City
11:00 CST (UTC−6)	De la Mora 40'	Report		Stadium: Estadio Momoxco; Attendance: 100; Referee: Marco Antonio Návez Hernández

2 February 2022	Saltillo Soccer	0–0 (4–2 p)	Gavilanes de Matamoros	Saltillo, Coahuila
18:00 CST (UTC−6)		Report		Stadium: Estadio Olímpico Francisco I. Madero; Attendance: 200; Referee: Ricardo Joseph Zárate Balderas

Not played	Aragón (w)	v	Lobos Huerta	Gustavo A. Madero, Mexico City
		Report		Stadium: Deportivo Francisco Zarco

=== Quarter–finals ===
Team 1	Score	Team 2
Muxes	2–1	Aragón
Deportiva Venados	3–0	Juárez
Aguacateros de Peribán (p.)	2–2 (4–3)	Tecos
Saltillo Soccer	2–1	Cimarrones de Sonora

8 February 2022	Muxes	2–1	Aragón	Texcoco, State of Mexico
12:00 CST (UTC−6)	Martínez 46'; Jiménez 49'	Report	Rodríguez 78'	Stadium: Estadio Municipal Claudio Suárez; Attendance: 100; Referee: Miguel Ángel Morales Sánchez

8 February 2022	Saltillo Soccer	2–1	Cimarrones de Sonora	Saltillo, Coahuila
15:30 CST (UTC−6)	Alanís 61'; Orellana 88'	Report	Enríquez 65'	Stadium: Estadio Olímpico Francisco I. Madero; Attendance: 200; Referee: Kevin Kober Contreras Reyes

8 February 2022	Aguacateros de Peribán	2–2 (4–3 p)	Tecos	Peribán, Michoacán
16:00 CST (UTC−6)	Cota 62'; Galván 90'	Report	Sánchez 38'; Casillas 51'	Stadium: Estadio Municipal de Peribán

10 February 2022	Deportiva Venados	3–0	Juárez	Tamanché, Yucatán
15:00 CST (UTC−6)	Maya 11'; Ramírez 55'; Valerio 80'	Report		Stadium: Estadio Alonso Diego Molina; Attendance: 300; Referee: Diego Gilberto Gurrea Mendoza

=== Semi–finals ===
Team 1	Score	Team 2
Muxes	2–0	Deportiva Venados
Saltillo Soccer	0–2	Aguacateros de Peribán

22 February 2022	Saltillo Soccer	0–2	Aguacateros de Peribán	Saltillo, Coahuila
15:30 CST (UTC−6)		Report	Pizano 11'; López 87'	Stadium: Estadio Olímpico Francisco I. Madero; Attendance: 2,000; Referee: Julián Alejandro Duarte Peña

23 February 2022	Muxes	2–0	Deportiva Venados	Texcoco, State of Mexico
15:00 CST (UTC−6)	Marcelino 34'; Cibrián 69'	Report		Stadium: Estadio Municipal Claudio Suárez; Attendance: 200; Referee: Enrique Augusto Ramírez Gutiérrez

=== Final ===
Team 1	Score	Team 2
Muxes	1–1 (5–6)	(p.) Aguacateros de Peribán

10 March 2022	Muxes	1–1 (5–6 p)	Aguacateros de Peribán	Texcoco, State of Mexico
15:00 CST (UTC−6)	Vizcaya 71'	Report	Ayala 15'	Stadium: Estadio Municipal Claudio Suárez; Attendance: 600; Referee: Jesús Enrique Herrera Armenta

2021–22 winners
Aguacateros de Peribán
1st title

== See also ==
- 2021–22 Serie A de México season
- 2021–22 Serie B de México season
- 2021–22 Liga TDP season
