= Pepe Muñoz =

Mexican footballer and manager (born 1983)

Personal information
- Full name: José Roberto Muñoz Rodríguez
- Date of birth: 14 April 1983 (age 43)
- Place of birth: Morelia, Michoacán, Mexico
- Height: 1.81 m (5 ft 11 1/2 in)
- Position: Midfielder

Senior career*
Years	Team	Apps	(Gls)
2005	Mérida	0	(0)

Managerial career
- 2012–2014: Peces Blancos de Pátzcuaro
- 2014–2018: CDU Uruapan
- 2018–2023: Aguacateros CDU
- 2023–2024: Atlético Morelia (Assistant)
- 2023: Atlético Morelia (Interim)
- 2024: La Piedad
- 2025: Halcones
- * Club domestic league appearances and goals

José Roberto Muñoz Rodríguez (born 14 April 1983), known as Pepe Muñoz, is a Mexican football manager and former player. He was born in Morelia. He is the brother of Moisés Muñoz, a former footballer who played as a goalkeeper, he also is the cousin of Carlos Felipe Rodríguez, who also plays as a goalkeeper.

== Career ==
Muñoz had a brief career as a football player, playing in the youth teams of Monarcas Morelia, in 2005 he was registered to debut as a professional football player in Mérida F.C., which at that time functioned as Morelia's reserve team, however, he was unable to debut for an injury, he subsequently retired as a professional footballer.

In 2012 he began his career as a coach when he was selected to lead the Peces Blancos de Pátzcuaro club, of the Third Division, in 2014 the Pátzcuaro team was relocated to Uruapan and renamed CDU Uruapan, although Muñoz continued managing the club. In 2015 CDU Uruapan was the Third Division champion with Muñoz as manager. In July 2018 the team had another name change, it was renamed Aguacateros CDU after a merger with the other team in the city, however, Muñoz remained on the team with the same manager position.

In 2019 Aguacateros CDU was invited to the Liga Premier – Serie B, due to its good sporting performance in the Liga TDP. In the Apertura 2021 and Clausura 2022 tournaments, the club managed to win both championships, with Muñoz as manager, thus achieving promotion to Serie A.

In March 2023, Muñoz was appointed as managerial assistant of Atlético Morelia, joining Carlos Adrián Morales' technical staff. On 20 October 2023, Muñoz was named as the club's interim manager following the dismissal of Morales. During his stay as interim manager of Atlético Morelia, Muñoz managed to qualify the team for the play-offs, after defeating Venados F.C. in the Play-in, although the team was eliminated in the quarterfinals by Leones Negros UdeG. On 5 December 2023, José Roberto Muñoz left the position of interim manager after the appointment of Israel Hernández Pat as the new Morelia's head coach.

On 6 June 2024, Muñoz was appointed as the new manager of C.F. La Piedad, a team that plays in the Liga Premier – Serie A. On 17 October 2024 he was sacked for poor results.

In December 2024, Muñoz became the new manager of Halcones F.C., a team that plays in the Liga Premier – Serie A. He was dismissed in September 2025 due to poor results.

In December 2025, Muñoz was named as the sports director of Aguacateros CDU. In March 2026 he left the Aguacateros position after being appointed as head of the sports office of the Uruapan City Council.

== Honours ==
=== Manager ===
CDU Uruapan

- Liga TDP: 2014–15

Aguacateros CDU

- Liga Premier – Serie B: Apertura 2021, Clausura 2022
