= Guerreros de Xico =

Mexican football club

C.D. Guerreros de Xico
- Full name: Club Deportivo Guerreros de Xico
- Founded: June 2021; 4 years ago
- Dissolved: June 2022; 3 years ago
- Ground: Estadio Jesús Martínez "Palillo", Mexico City, Mexico
- Capacity: 6,000
- League: Liga Premier - Serie B
- Clausura 2022: 7th
Home colours	Away colours

The Club Deportivo Guerreros de Xico is a Mexican football club based in Mexico City. The club was founded in 2021, and currently plays in the Serie B of Liga Premier.

== History ==
The team was founded in June 2021 and was entered into the Liga Premier – Serie B on July 30, 2021. However, previously there was a related team that competed in the Liga TDP with the name Valle de Xico F.C., which played between 2019 and 2020.

The team played its first official game on September 18, 2021, in the game the Guerreros were defeated by Aguacateros C.D. Uruapan with a score of 0–6.

The team only stayed for one season due to poor sporting results, as they obtained only 1 point in 24 games played, in addition to attracting poor interest from local fans, so in June 2022 the club went into hiatus, one year later it was dissolved after the hiatus permit period expired and it did not return to activity.

== Stadium ==
The Estadio Jesús Martínez "Palillo" is a multi-use stadium located in the Magdalena Mixhuca Sports City in Mexico City. The stadium has a capacity of 6,000 people.

== Players ==
As of January 13, 2022
