= Unidad Deportiva Hermanos López Rayón =

Multi-use stadium in Uruapan, Michoacán, Mexico

- Interactive map of Unidad Deportiva Hermanos López Rayón
- Full name: Estadio de la Unidad Deportiva Hermanos López Rayón
- Location: Uruapan, Michoacán, Mexico
- Coordinates: 19°25′30″N 102°1′59″W
- Owner: Uruapan City Council
- Operator: Aguacateros CDU
- Capacity: 5,000
- Surface: Natural grass

Construction
- Opened: March 3, 1964

Tenants
- Tapatío (1981–1982); Gallos Blancos (2009–2010); Tarascos Uruapan (2010–2011); C.D. Uruapan (2012–2018); Originales Aguacateros (2010–2018); Aguacateros CDU (2018–present); Aguacateros de Peribán (2023–2024); Halcones AFU (2023–2026); Halcones F.C. (2025–2026)

The Estadio de la Unidad Deportiva Hermanos López Rayón is a multi-use stadium in Uruapan, Michoacán. It is currently used mostly for football matches and is the home stadium for Aguacateros CDU. The stadium has a capacity of 5,000 people.
