= Estadio El Pocito =

Multi-use stadium in Querétaro City, Mexico

The Estadio El Pocito is a multi-use stadium located in Querétaro City, Querétaro. It is currently used mostly for American football matches. The stadium has a capacity of 4,000 people.

The stadium has served as the home venue for the Querétaro Institute of Technology (ITQ) football team, the Zorros ITQ, which competed in ONEFA.
