= Aguacateros de Peribán F.C. =

Mexican football club

Aguacateros de Peribán FC
- Full name: Aguacateros de Peribán Fútbol Club
- Nickname: Aguacateros (Avocado producers)
- Founded: 2020; 6 years ago
- Ground: Estadio Municipal de Peribán; Peribán, Michoacán
- Capacity: 3,000
- Owner: Irrahel Romero
- Chairman: Irrahel Romero
- Manager: Vacant
- League: Liga Premier (Serie A)
- Clausura 2025: Regular season: 1st (Group II); Final phase: Runners-up
Home colours	Away colours

Aguacateros de Peribán Fútbol Club is a Mexican professional football club based in Peribán, Michoacán, that competes in the Liga Premier - Serie A of the Segunda División de México, the third division level of Mexican football.

== History ==
The team was founded in 2020, beginning to compete that same year in the Tercera División de México. In 2021 and 2022, the team qualified for the final phase of the tournament, although being eliminated in the Round of 16 on both occasions.

Due to its good performances in the Tercera División, Aguacateros de Peribán was able to participate in the first edition of the Copa Conecta, finally on March 8, 2022, the team won the trophy after defeating Muxes in the penalty shoot-out. Previously the team had eliminated the clubs Gorilas de Juanacatlán, Estudiantes de Querétaro, Tecos and Saltillo Soccer.

In the 2022-23 Tercera División season, the team achieved its best historical participation in the Tercera División, in addition to being promoted to the Liga Premier - Serie A. This after eliminating the clubs AFAR Manzanillo, CEPROFFA, Tuzos UAZ, Lobos ITECA and Poza Rica.

On May 27, 2023, the team was proclaimed champion of the Liga TDP season after defeating Aragón F.C. by a score of 0–2.

On December 22, 2024, Peribán won its first Liga Premier – Serie A championship, after defeating Irapuato 3–1 in a penalty shootout, having previously tied three goals in the aggregate score of the final series.

On May 18, 2025, Peribán won the season's champions' trophy after defeating Irapuato on penalties, earning the right to be auditioned for possible promotion to the Liga de Expansión MX. Ultimately, after failing the review process, the team was not invited to the second division level, so its place in that division was taken by Irapuato.

On July 16, 2025, the club went on hiatus because the management prefers to wait until the completion of its new stadium to avoid problems with the approval of its field as occurred at the end of the previous season.

== Honors ==
- Segunda División de México
  - Champions (1): Apertura 2024
  - Runners-up (1): Clausura 2025
- Campeón de Campeones de la Liga Premier
  - Champions (1): 2025
- Liga TDP
  - Champions (1): 2022–23
- Copa Conecta
  - Champions (1): 2021–22

== Players ==
=== First-team squad ===
As of 26 August 2025

Note: Flags indicate national team as defined under FIFA eligibility rules; some limited exceptions apply. Players may hold more than one non-FIFA nationality.

No. / Pos. / Nation / Player	No. / Pos. / Nation / Player

== Managers ==
- (Mexico) Carlos Caballero (2020–2021)
- (Mexico) Olimpo Campos (2021–2022)
- (Mexico) Marco Angúlo (2023–2025)
