= Ángeles SUD F.C. Morelos =

- Full name: Ángeles SUD Fútbol Club Morelos
- Founded: April 2020; 5 years ago
- Dissolved: August 2021; 4 years ago
- Ground: Estadio Mariano Matamoros, Xochitepec, Morelos, Mexico
- Capacity: 16,000
- Manager: Vacant
- League: Liga Premier de México – Serie B
Home colours	Away colours

Ángeles SUD Fútbol Club Morelos was a Mexican football club that was looking to play in the Liga Premier – Serie B, it was located in Xochitepec, Morelos.

== History ==
The team was founded in April 2020 with the aim of enrolling in the Liga de Balompié Mexicano, however, it was ultimately not accepted among the founding clubs of this football league since Morelos F.C., a team that sought to represent the same area, was the club accepted in the competition.

After the refusal to enter the LBM, the team spent a year without participating in any professional competition, maintaining the activity at the amateur level. In May 2021 it was announced that the club was in the process of joining the Femexfut and thus participating in the Liga Premier de México, the third-level league of the Femexfut-affiliated league system.

Finally, on July 30, 2021, the club's entry into the Liga Premier was confirmed, being registered in Serie B, the development category of this division. However, the team was later removed from the list of league participants, so it never officially debuted.

== Stadium ==
The Estadio Mariano Matamoros is a multi-use stadium in Xochitepec. It is currently used mostly for football matches. The stadium has a capacity of 16,000 people and was opened in 1981.
