= Estadio Mariano Matamoros =

Football stadium in Xochitepec, Mexico

Coordinates: 19.7808°N 99.7645°W

- Interactive map of Estadio Mariano Matamoros
- Full name: Estadio Mariano Matamoros
- Location: Xochitepec, Morelos, Mexico
- Owner: Xochitepec Town Council
- Operator: Zacatepec F.C.
- Capacity: 16,000
- Surface: Grass

Construction
- Opened: 1981

Tenants
- Marte Morelos (1993–1997); Colibríes de Morelos (2003); Leones Morelos (2004); Ballenas Galeana Morelos (2011–2013); Selva Cañera (2013–2014); Internacional de Acapulco (2015); Atlético Cuernavaca (2017–2019); Morelos (2020); Ángeles Morelos (2021); Zacatepec (2025–)

The Estadio Mariano Matamoros is a multi-use stadium in Xochitepec. It is currently used mostly for football matches and is the home stadium for Zacatepec F.C. of Liga Premier de México – Serie A. The stadium has a capacity of 16,000 people.
