= Aguacateros C.D. Uruapan =

Mexican football club

Aguacateros CDU
- Full name: Aguacateros Club Deportivo Uruapan
- Nicknames: Los Aguacateros (Avocado producers); El Oro Verde (Green gold)
- Founded: 17 July 2018; 8 years ago
- Ground: Unidad Deportiva Hermanos López Rayón; Uruapan, Michoacán
- Capacity: 5,000
- Owner: Guillermo Verduzco Duarte
- Chairman: Guillermo Verduzco Duarte
- Manager: Edgar Tolentino
- League: Liga TDP
- 2025–26: Liga Premier (Serie B); Regular phase: 8th Final phase: Did not qualify
Home colours	Away colours

Aguacateros Club Deportivo Uruapan is a Mexican football club based in Uruapan, Michoacán that competes in the Liga TDP, the fourth level division of Mexican football. The club was founded in 2018, after the merger between C.D. Uruapan and the Club Originales Aguacateros de Uruapan.

== History ==
=== Origins ===
In 2015, C.D. Uruapan won the championship of the Tercera División de México after defeating Sporting Canamy. The team competed for a season in Liga de Nuevos Talentos after failing to meet the requirements to promote to the Liga Premier de Ascenso. With the federative seat of CDU Uruapan, another team called Titanes de Saltillo was created, finally, the CDU Uruapan returned to the Tercera División.

=== Aguacateros C.D. Uruapan ===
In July 2018, the team was founded with the name Aguacateros Club Deportivo Uruapan after the merger of Club Deportivo Uruapan and the team Originales Aguacateros de Uruapan with the aim of creating a unified team that represents the city as well as looking for an economic saving, since instead of financing two clubs, it would be just one single club. The new team occupied the federative position belonging to Originales Aguacateros, formed with players from both clubs and acquired the technical body of the CDU.

Meanwhile, the CDU franchise was rented to a group of entrepreneurs who created another team called Futcenter, which was based in Tlalnepantla, State of Mexico. This club used the CDU Uruapan name as a registration in the Federación Mexicana de Fútbol (FMF), but it was completely separate from the Michoacán-based team. In 2019, this team was dissolved.

On June 28, 2019, the team was accepted as a new member of the Liga Premier – Serie B. In the 2020–21 season, the team temporarily played in the Liga Premier – Serie A due to the league holding a one-off tournament as a result of the COVID-19 pandemic.

In the 2021–22 season, the team returned to the Serie B, in that cycle the club won the two tournaments of the season for which it got its promotion in a sporting way to the Serie A. However, the team only stayed in the Serie A for one year, since for the 2023–2024 season the club's board of directors decided to relocate the team to the Serie B, due to the interest of the owners to increase the relationship of Aguacateros CDU with Atlético Morelia.

In the 2023–24 season the team won the Serie B again, achieving its third championship in this category, and returning to the Serie A after a one-year absence. In the summer of 2024, Aguacateros CDU became an affiliate team of Atlético Morelia, so an exchange of players between both teams began to take place, in addition to the Uruapan team started to being managed by Atlético Morelia's board.

For the 2026–27 season, the club put its Liga Premier franchise on hiatus due to financial issues, returning instead to compete in the Liga TDP.

== Players ==
=== Current squad ===
As of January 15, 2026

Note: Flags indicate national team as defined under FIFA eligibility rules; some limited exceptions apply. Players may hold more than one non-FIFA nationality.

No.	Pos.	Nation	Player
2	DF	MEX	Santiago Flores
9	FW	MEX	Oliver Melgoza
10	FW	MEX	Diego Chávez
11	FW	MEX	Hugo Ávila
34	GK	MEX	Bryan González
81	DF	MEX	Edwin Quezada
82	MF	MEX	Francisco Flores
83	MF	MEX	Hugo Barajas
84	MF	MEX	Emanuel Rojas
85	GK	MEX	Joel Muñoz
86	MF	USA	Adán Mora
87	DF	MEX	Kevin Arias

No.	Pos.	Nation	Player
88	DF	MEX	Diego Ávalos
89	DF	MEX	Ever Campos
90	MF	MEX	Jairo Ortiz
91	GK	MEX	Eduardo Hernández
92	DF	MEX	Samuel Rivera
93	MF	MEX	Armando Villanueva
94	DF	MEX	Diego García
95	MF	MEX	Dilan Galván
96	MF	MEX	Brian Rocha
97	MF	MEX	Ángel Plancarte
98	FW	MEX	Jesús Silva
99	MF	MEX	Jorge Rivera

== Managers ==
- (Mexico) Pepe Muñoz (2018–2023)
- (Mexico) Gerardo Castillo (2023–2024)
- (Mexico) Edgar Tolentino (2024–)

== Honours ==
- Serie B de México

Winners: Apertura 2021, Clausura 2022, 2023–24

== See also ==
- Football in Mexico
- Tercera División de México
