= Lobos Huerta F.C. =

Mexican football club

Lobos CARH
- Full name: Lobos CARH Fútbol Club
- Founded: May 2021; 5 years ago
- Ground: Estadio Arreola, Chalco, State of Mexico, Mexico
- Capacity: 3,217
- Owner: Alberto Escobar
- Chairman: Alberto Escobar
- Manager: Profe. Enrique
- League: Retomando LIGA PREMIER de Fedeacion Mexicana, FMF, Activo en Liga de Academias y Campeon de Liga de Balompié Mexicano
- 202O–2026: Campeones 2026 Liga de Academias, Campeon 2025 UPSL, Campeon 2024 Liga de Clubes, Campeon 2025 Liga de Balompie Mexicano
Home colours	Away colours

The Lobos CARH Fútbol Club is a Mexican football club based in Chalco. The club was founded in 2021, and currently plays in the Liga de Balompié Mexicano.

== History ==
The team was founded in May 2021 and was entered into the Liga Premier – Serie B on July 30, 2021. On September 18 the team played its first official game, in this game the team defeated Club Calor with a score of 2-1, Patricio Navarro scored the club's first goal.

The team only stayed one season in the Liga Premier - Serie B because for the 2022-2023 season its registration was rejected due to having debts with the league and the FMF. After this the team registered in the Liga de Balompié Mexicano, where the team was accepted and renamed Lobos USSL and later Lobos MX.

In August 2023 the team changed its identity again, for which it was renamed Lobos CARH.

== Players ==
=== Current squad ===
As of July 28, 2023

Note: Flags indicate national team as defined under FIFA eligibility rules; some limited exceptions apply. Players may hold more than one non-FIFA nationality.

No.	Pos.	Nation	Player
1	GK	MEX	Carlos Porras
2	DF	MEX	Edson Trejo
3	DF	MEX	Gerardo Hernández
4	DF	MEX	Khain Hernández
5	MF	MEX	Juan Ángel Zárate
6	MF	MEX	Germán Uribe
8	MF	MEX	Erick Guido
9	FW	MEX	Mauricio Díaz
10	GK	MEX	Daniel Rodríguez
11	MF	MEX	Edgardo Olvera
14	MF	MEX	Alan José Chávez
15	MF	MEX	Oscar López
16	DF	MEX	Carlos Barrera
17	FW	MEX	Raúl Sampayo
18	MF	MEX	José Miguel Salgado
19	MF	MEX	Jonhatan Valdez

No.	Pos.	Nation	Player
20	DF	MEX	Fabián Laguna
21	DF	MEX	Diego Ramírez
22	MF	MEX	Ángel Parada
23	DF	MEX	Armando Parada
24	DF	MEX	Roberto Ramírez
26	GK	MEX	Raúl Mendoza
28	DF	MEX	Christian González
29	DF	MEX	José Eduardo Mata
30	FW	MEX	José Eduardo Morales
32	MF	MEX	Ángel Mendoza
34	DF	MEX	Fidel Antonio
35	DF	MEX	Abraham Sedillo
36	DF	MEX	Antonio de Jesús Guevara
38	MF	MEX	Luis Antonio Dorantes
39	FW	MEX	Jean Carlos García
40	DF	MEX	Héctor Flores
