= 2007–08 Mexican Segunda División season =

Segunda División de México
- Season: 2007–08
- Dates: 17 August 2007 – 25 May 2008
- Champions: Apertura: Pachuca Juniors; Clausura; Universidad del Fútbol
- Promoted: Pachuca Juniors
- Stats are from the regular season only

The 2007–08 Segunda División de México season was split in two tournaments Apertura and Clausura. Segunda División was the third-tier football league of Mexico. The season was played between 17 August 2007 and 25 May 2008.

This was the last season in which the Segunda División was played in a unified league, a situation that was repeated until the 2020–21 edition, starting in August 2008, the Second Division was divided into two leagues: Liga Premier de Ascenso and Liga de Nuevos Talentos.

== Teams ==
=== South Zone ===
Location of teams in the 2007–08 Segunda División Southern Zone

Club	City	Stadium	Capacity
Albinegros de Orizaba	Orizaba, Veracruz	Socum	7,000
Alebrijes de Oaxaca	Oaxaca City, Oaxaca	General Manuel Cabrera Carrasquedo	3,000
Ángeles de Comsbmra	San Andrés Cholula, Puebla (Ap.); Acapulco, Guerrero (Cl.)	Preparatoria Benito Juárez (Ap.); Unidad Deportiva Acapulco (Cl.)	1,500; 13,000
Chimbombos de Cintalapa	Cintalapa, Chiapas	Municipal de Cintalapa	4,000
Guerreros de Tabasco	Tenosique, Tabasco	Ángel 'Gello' Zubieta Valenzuela	2,000
Inter Playa del Carmen	Playa del Carmen, Quintana Roo	Mario Villanueva Madrid	7,000
Itzaes Yucatán	Mérida, Yucatán	Carlos Iturralde	15,087
Jaguares de Tabasco	Comalcalco, Tabasco	Antonio Valenzuela Alamilla; Cefor Atlante Tabasco	1,000; 500
Mérida	Mérida, Yucatán	Carlos Iturralde	15,087
Ocelotes UNACH	Tapachula, Chiapas	Olímpico de Tapachula	11,000
Pioneros de Cancún	Cancún, Quintana Roo	Cancún 86	6,390
Teos La Firma	Boca del Río, Veracruz	Facultad de Educación Física	1,200
Tiburones Rojos de Córdoba	Córdoba, Veracruz	Rafael Murillo Vidal	3,800

=== Central Zone ===
Location of teams in the 2007–08 Segunda División Central Zone

Club	City	Stadium	Capacity
América Coapa	Mexico City	Instalaciones Club América en Coapa	1,000
Astros de Cuernavaca	Cuernavaca, Morelos	Centenario	14,800
Atlético Tapatío–Chalco	Chalco, State of Mexico	Arreola	2,500
Ballenas Galeana Morelos	Xochitepec, Morelos	Mariano Matamoros	16,000
Cañeros del Zacatepec	Zacatepec, Morelos	Agustín "Coruco" Díaz	13,000
Cuautla	Cuautla, Morelos	Isidro Gil Tapia	5,000
Gallos Blancos de Izcalli	Cuautitlán Izcalli, State of Mexico	Hugo Sánchez Márquez; Metropolitano	3,500; 4,000
Lobos Prepa	Puebla City, Puebla	Universitario BUAP	19,283
Pachuca Juniors	Pachuca, Hidalgo	Hidalgo	27,512
Potros UAEM	Toluca, State of Mexico	Universitario Alberto "Chivo" Córdoba	32,603
Puebla	Puebla City, Puebla	Cuauhtémoc	42,648
Pumas Naucalpan	Mexico City	La Cantera	2,000
Pumas Prepa	Mexico City	La Cantera	2,000
Tecamachalco	Huixquilucan, State of Mexico	Alberto Pérez Navarro; Neza 86	3,000; 20,000
Garzas UAEH	Pachuca, Hidalgo	Revolución Mexicana	3,500
Universidad del Fútbol	San Agustín Tlaxiaca, Hidalgo	Universidad del Fútbol	1,000

=== Bajío Zone ===
Location of teams in the 2007–08 Segunda División Bajío Zone

Club	City	Stadium	Capacity
Atlético Cuauhtémoc	Aguascalientes City, Aguascalientes	Parque Infantil Benito Juárez	1,000
Cachorros León	León, Guanajuato	Nou Camp	31,297
Cadereyta	Cadereyta de Montes, Querétaro	Cadereyta	2,000
Cruz Azul Jasso	Ciudad Cooperativa Cruz Azul, Hidalgo	10 de Diciembre	7,761
Halcones del Valle del Mezquital	Tezontepec, Hidalgo	San Juan	3,000
Irapuato	Irapuato, Guanajuato	Sergio León Chávez	25,000
Necaxa Rayos	San Juan de los Lagos, Jalisco	Antonio R. Márquez; Casa Club Necaxa	1,500; 1,000
Petroleros de Salamanca	Salamanca, Guanajuato	Olímpico Sección 24	10,000
Querétaro	Querétaro City, Querétaro	Corregidora	33,162
Soles de Acolman	Acolman, State of Mexico	Municipal de Acolman	1,200
Teca Huixquilucan	Huixquilucan, State of Mexico	Alberto Pérez Navarro	3,000
Titanes de Tulancingo	Tulancingo, Hidalgo	Primero de Mayo	2,500
Toluca	Metepec, State of Mexico	Instalaciones de Metepec	1,000
Toros de Zacatecas	Zacatecas City, Zacatecas	Francisco Villa	13,000
Unión de Curtidores	León, Guanajuato	La Martinica	11,000

=== Western Zone ===
Location of teams in the 2007–08 Segunda División Western Zone

Club	City	Stadium	Capacity
Atlas	Zapopan, Jalisco	Atlas Colomos	3,000
Atlético Cihuatlán	Cihuatlán, Jalisco	El Llanito	5,000
Búhos de Hermosillo	Hermosillo, Sonora	Héroe de Nacozari	18,747
Cachorros UdeG	Zapopan, Jalisco	Municipal Santa Rosa; Club Deportivo U. de G.	3,500; 3,000
Chivas San Rafael	Guadalajara, Jalisco	Club Chivas San Rafael	800
Delfines de Los Cabos	Los Cabos, Baja California Sur	San José 78	1,000
Deportivo Autlán	Autlán, Jalisco	Unidad Deportiva Chapultepec	1,500
Dorados Los Mochis	Los Mochis, Sinaloa	Centenario LM	7,000
Guadalajara	Zapopan, Jalisco	Verde Valle	800
Jaguares de Zamora	Zamora, Michoacán	Unidad Deportiva El Chamizal	5,000
Monarcas Morelia	Morelia, Michoacán	Venustiano Carranza	17,600
Palmeros de Colima	Colima City, Colima	Colima; Olímpico Universitario	12,000; 11,812
UAG Tecomán	Zapopan, Jalisco	Deportivo UAG	1,000
Vaqueros	Ixtlán del Río, Nayarit	Unidad Deportiva Roberto Gómez Reyes	4,000

=== Northern Zone ===
Location of teams in the 2007–08 Segunda División Northern Zone

Club	City	Stadium	Capacity
Altamira	Altamira, Tamaulipas	Altamira	9,581
Atlético Lagunero	Gómez Palacio, Durango	Unidad Deportiva Francisco Gómez Palacio	4,000
Bravos	Nuevo Laredo, Tamaulipas	Unidad Deportiva Benito Juárez	5,000
Cachorros UANL	General Zuazua, Nuevo León	Instalaciones de Zuazua	800
Deportivo Durango	Durango City, Durango	Francisco Zarco	18,000
Dorados UACH	Chihuahua City, Chihuahua	Olímpico Universitario José Reyes Baeza	22,000
Excélsior	Salinas Victoria, Nuevo León	Centro Deportivo Soriana	2,000
Huracanes de Matamoros	Matamoros, Tamaulipas	Pedro Salazar Maldonado	3,000
Indios	Ciudad Juárez, Chihuahua	Olímpico Benito Juárez	19,703
Millonarios de La Joya	Guadalupe, Nuevo León	Unidad Deportiva Centro; Unidad Deportiva La Talaverna	5,000
Rayados 2a	Monterrey, Nuevo León	El Cerrito	1,000
Santos Laguna	Gómez Palacio, Durango	Santa Rita	1,000
Tampico Madero	Tampico Madero, Tamaulipas	Tamaulipas	19,667
U.A. Tamaulipas	Ciudad Victoria, Tamaulipas	Professor Eugenio Alvizo Porras	5,000
Unión Piedras Negras	Piedras Negras, Coahuila	Piedras Negras	6,000
Zorros de Reynosa	Reynosa, Tamaulipas	Adolfo López Mateos	10,000

== Torneo Apertura ==
=== Regular season ===
==== Southern Zone ====
===== League table =====
Pos	Team	Pld	W	D	L	GF	GA	GD	Pts	Qualification or relegation
1	Tiburones Rojos de Córdoba	12	9	2	1	21	7	+14	30	Liguilla de Ascenso
2	Pioneros de Cancún	12	8	2	2	25	12	+13	28	Liguilla de Ascenso
3	Albinegros de Orizaba	12	9	0	3	40	14	+26	27	Liguilla de Ascenso
4	Alebrijes de Oaxaca	12	7	2	3	26	22	+4	25	
5	Mérida	12	7	1	4	21	17	+4	23	
6	Itzaes Yucatán	12	5	5	2	27	12	+15	22	
7	Guerreros de Tabasco	12	5	3	4	22	14	+8	20	
8	Inter Playa del Carmen	12	3	3	6	16	20	−4	15	
9	Ocelotes UNACH	12	3	2	7	19	32	−13	11	
10	Ángeles de Comsbmra	12	3	1	8	15	24	−9	10	
11	Chimbombos de Cintalapa	12	2	3	7	8	24	−16	9	
12	Teos La Firma	12	1	3	8	15	31	−16	8	
13	Jaguares de Tabasco	12	1	3	8	10	36	−26	6	

Source: RSSSF

===== Results =====
Home \ Away	ALE	ANG	CHI	GUE	INP	ITZ	JAG	MER	OUC	ORI	PIO	TEO	TRC
Alebrijes de Oaxaca	—	—	2–0	1–0	—	—	4–1	4–0	6–4	—	—	—	—
Ángeles Comsbmra	1–1	—	4–1	—	0–1	—	—	—	—	0–3	0–1	5–2	1–2
Chimbombos	—	—	—	0–0	—	0–4	2–1	0–2	3–0	—	—	—	—
Guerreros Tabasco	—	2–0	—	—	—	3–3	—	—	—	—	4–0	2–2	0–1
Inter Playa	2–1	—	1–1	2–3	—	1–1	—	—	—	1–3	—	—	0–1
Itzaes Yucatán	2–3	4–0	—	—	—	—	—	—	—	4–2	2–2	4–0	0–0
Jaguares Tabasco	—	2–1	—	1–4	2–2	0–0	—	0–5	1–3	—	—	—	—
Mérida	—	3–0	—	2–0	3–2	0–3	—	—	—	—	2–1	1–0	—
Ocelotes UNACH	—	2–3	—	0–3	1–4	1–0	—	1–1	—	—	—	4–3	—
Orizaba	8–0	—	3–0	2–1	—	—	8–0	3–2	4–2	—	—	—	—
Pioneros Cancún	1–0	—	5–0	—	2–0	—	4–0	—	1–1	2–0	—	—	3–1
Teos La Firma	2–3	—	1–1	—	2–0	—	1–1	—	—	0–3	2–3	—	0–4
TR Córdoba	1–1	—	1–0	—	—	—	2–1	3–0	3–0	2–1	—	—	—

Source: Liga BBVA MX
Legend: Blue = home team win; Yellow = draw; Red = away team win.

==== Central Zone ====
===== League table =====
Pos	Team	Pld	W	D	L	GF	GA	GD	Pts	Qualification or relegation
1	Pachuca Juniors	15	11	3	1	34	9	+25	37	Liguilla de Ascenso
2	Pumas Naucalpan	15	9	4	2	32	14	+18	34	Liguilla de Ascenso
3	América Coapa	15	10	2	3	33	19	+14	34	Liguilla de Ascenso
4	Universidad del Fútbol	15	10	3	2	31	17	+14	34	Liguilla de Ascenso
5	Cuautla	15	7	4	4	23	19	+4	29	
6	Tecamachalco	15	6	3	6	32	29	+3	24	
7	Pumas Prepa	15	7	3	5	28	27	+1	24	Liguilla de Filiales
8	Potros UAEM	15	6	4	5	20	18	+2	23	
9	Cañeros del Zacatepec	15	7	2	6	21	24	−3	23	
10	Garzas UAEH	15	5	5	5	21	16	+5	22	
11	Ballenas Galeana Morelos	15	5	3	7	23	25	−2	20	
12	Puebla	15	5	3	7	16	21	−5	19	Liguilla de Filiales
13	Lobos Prepa	15	2	4	9	17	31	−14	12	
14	Astros de Cuernavaca	15	2	4	9	13	23	−10	11	
15	Atlético Tapatío–Chalco	15	1	5	9	18	31	−13	10	
16	Gallos Blancos de Izcalli	15	0	2	13	10	49	−39	3	

Source: RSSSF

===== Results =====
Home \ Away	AME	AST	ATP	BGM	CUA	GBL	LOB	PAC	PUE	PMN	PMP	TEC	UEH	UEM	UDF	ZAC
América Coapa	—	2–1	2–0	—	—	—	—	1–0	3–3	2–2	—	4–5	—	1–0	0–1	—
Astros Cuernavaca	—	—	—	1–3	2–2	3–1	2–1	—	—	—	0–1	—	0–1	1–1	—	1–3
Atlético Tapatío	—	1–0	—	1–2	—	2–2	2–2	1–2	0–1	—	—	4–5	—	—	—	—
Ballenas Galeana	1–2	—	—	—	0–1	—	—	—	—	2–4	3–1	—	1–2	—	3–3	0–1
Cuautla	3–4	—	3–2	—	—	—	—	0–1	0–0	2–1	—	1–2	—	1–0	5–2	—
Gallos Blancos de Izcalli	0–5	—	—	2–2	0–1	—	—	—	—	1–5	1–4	—	—	1–3	—	0–3
Lobos Prepa	1–3	—	—	1–2	1–2	4–1	—	—	—	—	1–1	—	1–1	1–2	—	2–1
Pachuca Juniors	—	0–0	—	2–0	—	4–0	4–0	—	—	—	4–0	—	3–1	2–2	—	6–2
Puebla	—	3–1	—	0–1	—	1–0	0–0	0–2	—	—	—	2–0	—	—	—	2–1
Pumas Naucalpan	—	1–0	4–0	—	—	—	3–1	1–2	2–0	—	—	3–2	—	0–0	2–0	—
Pumas Prepa	1–0	—	1–1	—	4–2	—	—	—	6–3	1–3	—	—	3–3	—	0–2	—
Tecamachalco	—	0–0	—	1–1	—	2–1	3–0	0–2	—	—	2–3	—	—	—	—	6–1
Garzas UAEH	0–1	—	2–2	—	0–0	6–0	—	—	1–0	0–0	—	2–0	—	—	0–1	—
Potros UAEM	—	—	1–1	3–2	—	—	—	—	2–0	—	0–2	3–1	3–2	—	0–2	0–1
Universidad del Fútbol	—	3–1	2–1	—	—	4–0	4–1	0–0	2–1	—	—	2–2	—	—	—	—
Zacatepec	1–3	—	2–0	—	0–0	—	—	—	—	1–1	2–0	—	1–0	—	1–3	—

Source: Liga BBVA MX
Legend: Blue = home team win; Yellow = draw; Red = away team win.

==== Bajío Zone ====
===== League table =====
Pos	Team	Pld	W	D	L	GF	GA	GD	Pts	Qualification or relegation
1	Atlético Cuauhtémoc	14	8	4	2	26	11	+15	31	Liguilla de Ascenso
2	Cruz Azul Jasso	14	9	3	2	26	13	+13	31	Liguilla de Ascenso
3	Irapuato	14	9	2	3	30	10	+20	29	Liguilla de Ascenso
4	Necaxa Rayos	14	8	2	4	29	15	+14	28	
5	Unión de Curtidores	14	8	3	3	23	14	+9	28	
6	Cachorros León	14	6	4	4	26	19	+7	25	
7	Toluca	14	6	4	4	12	10	+2	24	Liguilla de Filiales
8	Cadereyta	14	7	2	5	16	17	−1	24	
9	Titanes de Tulancingo	14	4	6	4	24	18	+6	22	
10	Halcones del Valle del Mezquital	14	4	3	7	15	22	−7	16	
11	Querétaro	14	3	4	7	18	29	−11	15	
12	Petroleros de Salamanca	14	4	2	8	19	25	−6	14	
13	Teca Huixquilucan	14	3	3	8	17	27	−10	13	
14	Soles de Acolman	14	3	2	9	19	27	−8	12	
15	Toros de Zacatecas	14	0	0	14	13	53	−40	0	

Source: RSSSF

===== Results =====
Home \ Away	ATC	CAC	CAD	CAJ	HVM	IRA	NEC	QUE	SAL	SOL	TCH	TOL	TOR	TUL	UDC
Atlético Cuauhtémoc	—	—	—	2–3	—	2–1	2–0	—	—	—	2–2	—	6–1	1–0	3–0
Cachorros León	0–0	—	4–1	—	0–1	—	—	4–1	3–1	5–2	—	1–2	—	—	—
Cadereyta	1–1	—	—	—	0–1	0–2	3–2	2–1	2–1	—	—	—	—	3–2	—
Cruz Azul Jasso	—	4–0	1–0	—	—	—	—	—	2–1	1–0	3–0	0–1	—	—	1–1
Halcones VM	1–1	—	—	1–3	—	1–1	0–2	—	—	—	—	—	2–1	2–3	1–3
Irapuato	—	0–0	—	2–0	—	—	—	—	—	4–2	4–1	1–0	8–0	—	2–1
Necaxa Rayos	—	2–0	—	2–2	—	1–0	—	—	—	—	2–1	—	8–1	3–2	0–1
Querétaro	1–3	—	—	1–2	2–1	0–3	1–1	—	—	—	—	—	4–1	2–2	—
Salamanca	0–1	—	—	—	0–2	2–1	0–4	2–2	—	—	—	—	4–1	0–2	—
Soles de Acolman	0–2	—	1–0	—	3–1	—	1–2	2–0	0–3	—	—	—	—	1–1	—
Teca Huixquilucan	—	1–2	0–1	—	1–1	—	—	1–1	3–4	2–1	—	1–0	—	—	—
Toluca	1–0	—	0–0	—	2–0	—	1–0	1–2	0–0	2–2	—	—	—	—	—
Toros de Zacatecas	—	0–3	1–2	1–3	—	—	—	—	—	2–3	2–3	1–2	—	—	0–2
Tulancingo	—	2–2	—	1–1	—	0–1	—	—	—	—	2–0	0–0	6–1	—	1–1
Unión de Curtidores	—	2–2	0–1	—	—	—	—	4–0	2–1	2–1	2–1	2–0	—	—	—

Source: Liga BBVA MX
Legend: Blue = home team win; Yellow = draw; Red = away team win.

==== Western Zone ====
===== League table =====
Pos	Team	Pld	W	D	L	GF	GA	GD	Pts	Qualification or relegation
1	Soccer Manzanillo	14	10	2	2	37	16	+21	33	Liguilla de Ascenso
2	Atlético Cihuatlán	14	8	4	2	21	17	+4	31	Liguilla de Ascenso
3	Dorados Los Mochis	14	9	1	4	25	20	+5	28	
4	Monarcas Morelia	14	8	3	3	28	26	+2	28	Liguilla de Filiales
5	Deportivo Autlán	14	8	2	4	24	16	+8	27	Liguilla de Ascenso
6	Vaqueros	14	7	2	5	19	15	+4	24	
7	Atlas	14	6	3	5	24	15	+9	23	
8	Chivas San Rafael	14	6	3	5	21	19	+2	23	Liguilla de Filiales
9	Cachorros UdeG	14	4	5	5	19	18	+1	19	
10	UAG Tecomán	14	5	3	6	19	23	−4	19	
11	Búhos de Hermosillo	14	3	3	8	16	22	−6	15	
12	Guadalajara	14	2	5	7	17	26	−9	14	
13	Jaguares de Zamora	14	3	4	7	20	26	−6	13	
14	Delfines de Los Cabos	14	4	1	9	15	26	−11	13	
15	Palmeros de Colima	14	0	3	11	7	27	−20	5	

Source: RSSSF

===== Results =====
Home \ Away	ATL	CIH	AUT	BUH	CUG	CHI	DEL	DLM	GUA	JAZ	MON	PAL	SMZ	UAG	VAQ
Atlas	—	—	—	2–1	—	0–1	—	5–0	—	—	4–1	0–0	3–4	—	0–1
Atlético Cihuatlán	3–1	—	—	2–1	0–0	—	—	2–1	—	2–1	2–2	—	—	2–2	—
Deportivo Autlán	2–1	—	—	—	0–2	0–1	—	—	1–1	1–0	9–2	—	—	1–1	—
Búhos de Hermosillo	—	—	0–1	—	—	1–1	1–2	—	2–1	—	—	2–0	1–2	—	2–1
Cachorros UdeG	0–1	—	—	1–1	—	2–0	—	2–2	—	—	1–2	1–1	0–2	—	—
Chivas San Rafael	—	1–2	0–2	—	—	—	4–0	—	2–2	2–0	—	—	—	3–1	4–2
Delfines de Los Cabos	0–1	4–1	0–1	—	2–1	—	—	—	1–1	1–3	—	—	—	0–2	—
Dorados Los Mochis	—	—	3–2	3–1	—	2–0	2–0	—	—	—	—	2–1	1–0	—	2–1
Guadalajara	1–1	0–1	—	—	4–4	—	—	2–3	—	2–3	1–2	—	—	1–0	—
Jaguares de Zamora	1–1	—	—	1–1	0–1	—	—	3–1	—	—	1–2	2–2	3–3	—	—
Monarcas Morelia	—	—	—	3–1	—	2–2	2–1	1–0	—	—	—	5–0	1–0	—	1–1
Palmeros de Colima	—	1–2	0–1	—	—	0–1	1–2	—	0–1	—	—	—	0–4	—	1–2
Soccer Manzanillo	—	1–1	4–1	—	—	3–0	4–2	—	5–0	—	—	—	—	3–2	1–0
UAG Tecomán	0–4	—	—	2–1	1–3	—	—	0–3	—	4–1	2–1	2–0	—	—	—
Vaqueros	—	2–0	1–2	—	2–1	—	2–0	—	1–0	3–1	—	—	—	0–0	—

Source: Liga BBVA MX
Legend: Blue = home team win; Yellow = draw; Red = away team win.

==== Northern Zone ====
===== League table =====
Pos	Team	Pld	W	D	L	GF	GA	GD	Pts	Qualification or relegation
1	Rayados 2a	15	7	7	1	25	12	+13	31	Liguilla de Filiales
2	Dorados UACH	15	8	4	3	35	20	+15	30	Liguilla de Ascenso
3	Cachorros UANL	15	7	7	1	23	16	+7	30	Liguilla de Filiales
4	Bravos de Nuevo Laredo	15	6	7	2	27	21	+6	29	Liguilla de Ascenso
5	Altamira	15	7	5	3	17	12	+5	28	Liguilla de Ascenso
6	Santos Laguna	15	7	4	4	39	25	+14	27	Liguilla de Filiales
7	Atlético Lagunero	15	5	7	3	22	19	+3	26	
8	U.A. Tamaulipas	15	7	2	6	27	19	+8	25	
9	Deportivo Durango	15	5	6	4	22	22	0	25	
10	Indios	15	5	4	6	18	24	−6	21	
11	Zorros de Reynosa	15	5	3	7	25	30	−5	20	
12	Tampico Madero	15	4	5	6	15	20	−5	20	
13	Excélsior	15	4	5	6	20	23	−3	19	
14	Millonarios de La Joya	15	2	4	9	19	31	−12	12	
15	Unión Piedras Negras	15	0	6	9	9	23	−14	9	
16	Huracanes de Matamoros	15	2	2	11	12	38	−26	8	

Source: RSSSF

===== Results =====
Home \ Away	ALT	ALG	BRA	CNL	DUC	DUR	EXC	HUR	IND	MLJ	RAY	SAN	TAM	UPN	UAT	ZOR
Altamira	—	1–1	1–1	1–1	3–1	—	—	—	1–0	—	1–1	—	—	1–0	—	3–1
Atlético Lagunero	—	—	—	1–2	2–1	4–1	—	—	—	1–1	—	3–2	1–1	—	1–0	—
Bravos	—	2–2	—	1–1	1–1	—	—	—	1–1	—	1–1	—	—	2–1	0–0	3–1
Cachorros UANL	—	—	—	—	3–1	2–1	4–3	—	—	2–2	—	0–0	2–0	—	0–2	—
Dorados UACH	—	—	—	—	—	2–0	4–0	6–1	—	4–1	—	4–1	2–1	—	2–2	—
Durango	1–0	—	4–1	—	—	—	2–2	2–0	—	2–1	2–2	—	—	—	—	3–1
Excélsior	0–1	1–1	0–1	—	—	—	—	5–1	—	—	0–2	—	—	0–0	—	1–1
Huracanes de Matamoros	0–1	1–2	0–2	1–1	—	—	—	—	—	—	2–2	—	—	2–0	—	2–4
Indios	—	2–0	—	1–1	2–2	2–2	1–2	2–0	—	2–1	—	—	—	3–2	—	—
Millonarios La Joya	0–0	—	4–3	—	—	—	0–1	5–1	—	—	1–2	—	—	1–1	—	2–3
Rayados 2a	—	1–1	—	1–2	1–1	—	—	—	5–0	—	—	2–1	—	1–0	2–0	2–0
Santos Laguna	4–1	—	2–2	—	—	2–2	3–1	6–0	4–0	4–1	—	—	3–2	—	—	—
Tampico Madero	1–0	—	1–3	—	—	0–0	1–3	2–0	1–0	1–0	0–0	—	—	—	—	—
Unión Piedras Negras	—	1–1	—	0–1	1–2	0–0	—	—	—	—	—	2–2	1–1	—	0–2	—
U.A. Tamaulipas	0–2	—	—	—	—	3–0	1–1	3–0	0–1	3–4	—	4–1	3–1	—	—	—
Zorros de Reynosa	—	2–1	—	1–1	1–2	—	—	—	2–1	—	—	1–4	2–2	4–0	1–3	—

Source: Liga BBVA MX
Legend: Blue = home team win; Yellow = draw; Red = away team win.

=== Liguilla de Ascenso ===
Round of 16
1	Pachuca Juniors	2	3	5
11	Irapuato	2	0	2
8	Atlético Cihuatlán	2	0	2
10	Dorados UACH	1	0	1
2	Pumas Naucalpan	0	1	1
3	América Coapa	2	0	2
13	Pioneros de Cancún	0	1	1 (2)
4	Universidad del Fútbol (pen.)	1	0	1 (3)
9	TR Córdoba	1	2	3
15	Albinegros de Orizaba	0	2	2
7	Cruz Azul Jasso	1	3	4
12	Bravos	1	0	1
5	Soccer Manzanillo (pen.)	1	1	2 (4)
14	Altamira	2	0	2 (2)
6	Atlético Cuauhtémoc	3	1	3
16	Deportivo Autlán	2	1	3

Quarter-finals
1	Pachuca Juniors	1	9	10
8	Atlético Cihuatlán	1	1	2
3	América Coapa	1	1	2
4	Universidad del Fútbol	1	0	1
9	TR Córdoba	1	2	3
7	Cruz Azul Jasso	0	2	2
5	Soccer Manzanillo	2	3	5
6	Atlético Cuauhtémoc	1	3	4

Semi-finals
1	Pachuca Juniors	4	2	6
3	América Coapa	1	2	3
9	TR Córdoba (pen.)	2	3	5 (5)
5	Soccer Manzanillo	4	1	5 (4)

Final
1	Pachuca Juniors	1	4	5
9	TR Córdoba	1	0	1

==== Round of 16 ====
Team 1	Agg.	Team 2	1st leg	2nd leg
Pachuca Juniors	5–2	Irapuato	2–2	3–0
Atlético Cihuatlán	2–1	Dorados UACH	2–1	0–0
Pumas Naucalpan	1–2	América Coapa	0–2	1–0
Pioneros de Cancún	1–1 (2–3)	Universidad del Fútbol	0–1	1–0
TR Córdoba	3–2	Albinegros de Orizaba	1–0	2–2
Cruz Azul Jasso	4–1	Bravos	1–1	3–0
Soccer Manzanillo (pen.)	2–2 (4–2)	Altamira	2–1	0–1
Atlético Cuauhtémoc	4–3	Deportivo Autlán	3–2	1–1

===== First leg =====
21 November 2007	América Coapa	2–0	Pumas Naucalpan	Mexico City
15:00	Pineda 6'; Barona 78'	Report		Stadium: Instalaciones Club América en Coapa; Attendance: 150; Referee: León Vicente Barajas Anzures

21 November 2007	Deportivo Autlán	2–3	Atlético Cuauhtémoc	Autlán
16:00	Padilla 23'; Quintero 63'	Report	Esparza 33'; Alcalá 47'; Covarrubias 78'	Stadium: Unidad Deportiva Chapultepec; Attendance: 200; Referee: Luis Enrique Santander Aguirre

21 November 2007	Bravos	1–1	Cruz Azul Jasso	Nuevo Laredo
20:00	Díaz 64'	Report	Orozco 17'	Stadium: Unidad Deportiva Benito Juárez; Attendance: 1,000; Referee: Carlos Jaime Jiverd Medrano

22 November 2007	Universidad del Fútbol	1–0	Pioneros de Cancún	Pachuca
12:00	Dávila 48'	Report		Stadium: Estadio Hidalgo

22 November 2007	Albinegros de Orizaba	0–1	TR Córdoba	Orizaba
15:30		Report	Hernández 27'	Stadium: Estadio Socum; Attendance: 3,000; Referee: Jorge Alberto Díaz González

22 November 2007	Altamira	2–1	Soccer Manzanillo	Altamira
16:00	Guzmán 71'; Salazar 89'	Report	Acosta 46'	Stadium: Estadio Altamira; Attendance: 500; Referee: Jorge Enrique Cruz Flores

22 November 2007	Dorados UACH	1–2	Atlético Cihuatlán	Chihuahua City
19:00	Márquez 54'	Report	Rebolledo 11', 44'	Stadium: Estadio Olímpico Universitario José Reyes Baeza; Attendance: 1,000; Referee: Mario Alonso Villa García

22 November 2007	Irapuato	2–2	Pachuca Juniors	Irapuato
20:15	Langarica 13'; Torres 75'	Report	Montes 17'; Brambila 59'	Stadium: Estadio Sergio León Chávez; Attendance: 4,000; Referee: Luis Miguel García Ávila

===== Second leg =====
24 November 2007	Pumas Naucalpan	1–0 (1–2 agg.)	América Coapa	Mexico City
11:00	Herrera 31'	Report		Stadium: Instalaciones de La Cantera; Attendance: 700; Referee: Henry Ulises The Ávila

24 November 2007	Cruz Azul Jasso	3–0 (4–1 agg.)	Bravos	Ciudad Cooperativa Cruz Azul
11:00	Jiménez 31', 58'; Trillo 88'	Report		Stadium: Estadio 10 de Diciembre; Attendance: 150; Referee: Arturo Cruz Hurtado

24 November 2007	Atlético Cuauhtémoc	1–1 (4–3 agg.)	Deportivo Autlán	Calvillo
15:00	Covarrubias 65'	Report	Aceves 80'	Stadium: Parque Infantil Benito Juárez; Attendance: 200; Referee: Victor Bisguerra Mendiola

25 November 2007	Atlético Cihuatlán	0–0 (2–1 agg.)	Dorados UACH	Cihuatlán
12:00		Report		Stadium: Estadio El Llanito; Attendance: 300; Referee: Miguel Ángel Flores Rodríguez

25 November 2007	Pachuca Juniors	3–0 (5–2 agg.)	Irapuato	Pachuca
12:00	Brambila 24'; Torres 47'; Cortés 67'	Report		Stadium: Estadio Hidalgo; Attendance: 300; Referee: Pablo Sánchez Yamasaki

25 November 2007	TR Córdoba	2–2 (3–2 agg.)	Albinegros de Orizaba	Córdoba
12:30	Sánchez 11'; Beltrán 86'	Report	Rojas 19'; Gil 42'	Stadium: Estadio Rafael Murillo Vidal; Attendance: 4,000; Referee: Osvaldo Sánchez Huerta

25 November 2007	Soccer Manzanillo	1–0 (2–2 agg.)	Altamira	Manzanillo
15:00	Jara 89'	Report		Stadium: Estadio Gustavo Vázquez Montes; Attendance: 600; Referee: Óscar Macías Romo

25 November 2007	Pioneros de Cancún	1–0 (1–1 agg.) (2–3 p)	Universidad del Fútbol	Cancún
15:00	Rodríguez 35'	Report		Stadium: Estadio Cancún 86; Attendance: 1,500; Referee: Raúl Alejandro Ucán Moreno

==== Quarter-finals ====
Team 1	Agg.	Team 2	1st leg	2nd leg
Pachuca Juniors	10–2	Atlético Cihuatlán	1–1	9–1
América Coapa	2–1	Universidad del Fútbol	1–1	1–0
TR Córdoba	3–2	Cruz Azul Jasso	1–0	2–2
Soccer Manzanillo	5–4	Atlético Cuauhtémoc	2–1	3–3

===== First leg =====
28 November 2007	Atlético Cihuatlán	1–1	Pachuca Juniors	Cihuatlán
12:00	Macías 31'	Report	Cruz 84'	Stadium: Estadio El Llanito; Attendance: 500; Referee: Juan Gerónimo Cruz Rivera

28 November 2007	Universidad del Fútbol	1–1	América Coapa	Pachuca
19:00	Sánchez 83'	Report	Espude 87'	Stadium: Estadio Hidalgo; Attendance: 100

29 November 2007	Cruz Azul Jasso	0–1	TR Córdoba	Ciudad Cooperativa Cruz Azul
11:00		Report	Sánchez 42'	Stadium: Estadio 10 de Diciembre; Attendance: 500; Referee: Luis Carlos Velázquez Benítez

29 November 2007	Atlético Cuauhtémoc	1–2	Soccer Manzanillo	Calvillo
15:00	Covarrubias 67'	Report	Hernández 21'; Acosta 34'	Stadium: Parque Infantil Benito Juárez; Attendance: 300; Referee: Erick Yair Miranda Galindo

===== Second leg =====
1 December 2007	Pachuca Juniors	9–1 (10–2 agg.)	Atlético Cihuatlán	Pachuca
12:00	Montes 8', 15', 58'; Brambila 30', 43', 67'; Estrada 40'; Pérez 63'; Báez 74'	Report	Macías 11'	Stadium: Estadio Hidalgo; Attendance: 200; Referee: Antony Zanjuampa Rojo

1 December 2007	América Coapa	1–0 (2–1 agg.)	Universidad del Fútbol	Mexico City
15:00	Barona 68'	Report		Stadium: Instalaciones Club América en Coapa; Attendance: 200; Referee: León Vicente Barajas Anzures

2 December 2007	TR Córdoba	2–2 (3–2 agg.)	Cruz Azul Jasso	Córdoba
12:30				Stadium: Estadio Rafael Murillo Vidal

2 December 2007	Soccer Manzanillo	3–3 (5–4 agg.)	Atlético Cuauhtémoc	Manzanillo
15:00	Arreola 9'; García 37'; Jara 87'	Report	Pérez 27'; Alcalá 59'; Covarrubias 77'	Stadium: Estadio Gustavo Vázquez Montes; Attendance: 600; Referee: Jorge Isaac Rojas Castillo

==== Semi-finals ====
Team 1	Agg.	Team 2	1st leg	2nd leg
Pachuca Juniors	6–3	América Coapa	4–1	2–2
TR Córdoba (pen.)	5–5(5–4)	Soccer Manzanillo	2–4	3–1

===== First leg =====
5 December 2007	América Coapa	1–4	Pachuca Juniors	Mexico City
15:00	Ojeda 8'	Report	Mañón 36'; Cortés 51'; Fajardo 55'; Cruz 85'	Stadium: Instalaciones Club América en Coapa; Attendance: 300; Referee: Julio David Escobar Barba

6 December 2007	Soccer Manzanillo	4–2	TR Córdoba	Manzanillo
15:00	Díaz 21'; Hernández 50', 89'; Jara 56'	Report	Sánchez 12'; Tapia 85'	Stadium: Estadio Gustavo Vázquez Montes; Attendance: 800; Referee: Víctor Bisguerra Mendiola

===== Second leg =====
8 December 2007	Pachuca Juniors	2–2 (6–3 agg.)	América Coapa	Pachuca
12:00	Mañón 18'; Cortés 75'	Report	Espude 54'; Rojina 80'	Stadium: Estadio Hidalgo; Attendance: 500; Referee: Luis Enrique Santander Aguirre

9 December 2007	TR Córdoba	3–1 (5–5 agg.) (5–4 p)	Soccer Manzanillo	Córdoba
12:30	Reyes 35'; Beltrán 49'; Amaya 89'	Report	Hernández 79'	Stadium: Estadio Rafael Murillo Vidal; Attendance: 4,000; Referee: Miguel Ángel Ayala Ramírez

==== Final ====
Team 1	Agg.	Team 2	1st leg	2nd leg
Pachuca Juniors	5–1	TR Córdoba	1–1	4–0

===== First leg =====
12 December 2007	TR Córdoba	1–1	Pachuca Juniors	Córdoba
15:00	Ruíz 52'	Report	Mañón 48'	Stadium: Estadio Rafael Murillo Vidal; Attendance: 6,000; Referee: Óscar Macías Romo

===== Second leg =====
15 December 2007	Pachuca Juniors	4–0 (5–1 agg.)	TR Córdoba	Pachuca
12:00	Cortés 20'; Brambila 55'; Mañón 57'; Fajardo 64'	Report		Stadium: Estadio Hidalgo; Attendance: 1,500; Referee: Luis Enrique Santander Aguirre

Apertura 2007 winners
Pachuca Juniors
3rd title

=== Liguilla de Filiales ===
Quarter-finals
1	Rayados 2a	1	2	3
8	Puebla	1	0	1
4	Santos Laguna	1	3	4
5	Toluca	1	2	3
2	Cachorros UANL	2	2	4
7	Pumas Prepa	2	1	3
3	Monarcas Morelia	0	5	5
6	Chivas San Rafael	3	0	3

Semi-finals
1	Rayados 2a	2	1	3
4	Santos Laguna	0	0	0
2	Cachorros UANL	0	2	2
3	Monarcas Morelia	4	1	5

Final
1	Rayados 2a	2	1	3
3	Monarcas Morelia	2	2	4

== Torneo Clausura ==
=== Regular season ===
==== Southern Zone ====
===== League table =====
Pos	Team	Pld	W	D	L	GF	GA	GD	Pts	Qualification or relegation
1	Mérida	12	8	3	1	25	8	+17	29	Liguilla de Ascenso
2	Pioneros de Cancún	12	8	2	2	18	12	+6	28	Liguilla de Ascenso
3	Tiburones Rojos de Córdoba	12	8	1	3	20	7	+13	26	Liguilla de Ascenso
4	Guerreros de Tabasco	12	7	2	3	28	11	+17	24	Liguilla de Ascenso
5	Albinegros de Orizaba	12	6	4	2	12	8	+4	23	
6	Itzaes Yucatán	12	5	3	4	17	10	+7	19	
7	Alebrijes de Oaxaca	12	6	0	6	24	20	+4	18	
8	Inter Playa del Carmen	12	4	3	5	15	11	+4	16	
9	Ángeles de Comsbmra	12	5	0	7	13	17	−4	15	
10	Jaguares de Tabasco	12	3	3	6	11	26	−15	14	
11	Ocelotes UNACH	12	3	3	6	20	24	−4	13	
12	Teos La Firma	12	2	1	9	11	31	−20	8	
13	Chimbombos de Cintalapa	12	0	1	11	4	33	−29	2	Relegated to Tercera División

Source: RSSSF

===== Results =====
Home \ Away	ALE	ANG	CHI	GUE	INP	ITZ	JAG	MER	OUC	ORI	PIO	TEO	TRC
Alebrijes de Oaxaca	—	0–1	—	—	3–1	1–5	—	—	—	2–0	3–1	8–0	1–0
Ángeles Comsbmra	—	—	—	1–2	—	3–1	4–0	1–2	1–0	—	—	—	—
Chimbombos	1–3	0–2	—	—	0–1	—	—	—	—	0–1	0–1	1–1	0–3
Guerreros Tabasco	3–0	—	8–0	—	1–0	—	4–2	0–1	6–2	0–0	—	—	—
Inter Playa	—	4–0	—	—	—	—	1–1	0–0	2–1	—	0–0	4–0	—
Itzaes Yucatán	2–3	4–0	—	—	—	—	—	—	—	4–2	2–2	4–0	0–0
Jaguares Tabasco	1–0	—	3–1	—	—	—	—	—	—	1–1	0–3	1–0	0–4
Mérida	4–1	—	4–0	—	—	—	2–0	—	2–1	0–0	—	—	3–1
Ocelotes UNACH	3–2	—	4–1	—	—	—	2–2	—	—	1–2	1–2	—	0–0
Orizaba	—	1–0	—	—	2–1	1–0	—	—	—	—	2–2	2–0	0–1
Pioneros Cancún	—	1–0	—	2–1	—	1–0	—	3–1	—	—	—	2–1	—
Teos La Firma	—	3–0	—	1–2	—	0–1	—	1–6	2–3	—	—	—	—
TR Córdoba	—	3–0	—	1–0	2–1	1–0	—	—	—	—	3–0	1–2	—

Source: Liga BBVA MX
Legend: Blue = home team win; Yellow = draw; Red = away team win.

==== Central Zone ====
===== League table =====
Pos	Team	Pld	W	D	L	GF	GA	GD	Pts	Qualification or relegation
1	Pachuca Juniors	15	13	1	1	53	11	+42	41	Liguilla de Ascenso
2	Universidad del Fútbol	15	10	1	4	32	14	+18	32	Liguilla de Ascenso
3	Pumas Naucalpan	15	8	5	2	26	17	+9	32	Liguilla de Ascenso
4	Pumas Prepa	15	8	3	4	26	17	+9	30	Liguilla de Filiales
5	Cañeros del Zacatepec	15	6	5	4	26	21	+5	26	
6	Gallos Blancos de Izcalli	15	6	4	5	13	17	−4	25	
7	Garzas UAEH	15	6	4	5	21	21	0	24	
8	Potros UAEM	15	6	3	6	19	20	−1	23	
9	América Coapa	15	4	6	5	22	24	−2	21	
10	Puebla	15	6	2	7	22	26	−4	21	Liguilla de Filiales
11	Ballenas Galeana Morelos	15	5	3	7	21	25	−4	18	
12	Tecamachalco	15	5	2	8	20	24	−4	18	
13	Astros de Cuernavaca	15	4	5	6	15	23	−8	18	
14	Cuautla	15	2	7	6	12	28	−16	15	
15	Atlético Tapatío–Chalco	15	2	3	10	11	32	−21	10	
16	Lobos Prepa	15	1	2	12	13	32	−19	6	

Source: RSSSF

===== Results =====
Home \ Away	AME	AST	ATP	BGM	CUA	GBL	LOB	PAC	PUE	PMN	PMP	TEC	UEH	UEM	UDF	ZAC
América Coapa	—	—	—	1–1	4–0	1–1	2–1	—	—	—	0–2	—	1–1	—	—	4–2
Astros Cuernavaca	1–1	—	0–0	—	—	—	—	1–6	0–2	0–3	—	3–1	—	—	1–0	—
Atlético Tapatío	1–0	—	—	—	1–1	—	—	—	—	1–1	0–6	—	2–3	0–1	2–5	0–2
Ballenas Galeana	—	1–4	5–1	—	—	3–0	2–1	1–1	2–1	—	—	2–0	—	1–2	—	—
Cuautla	—	1–1	—	2–0	—	0–1	2–1	—	—	—	1–1	—	0–3	—	—	1–1
Gallos Blancos de Izcalli	—	0–0	2–0	—	—	—	3–2	0–2	3–2	—	—	1–0	1–1	—	1–0	—
Lobos Prepa	—	0–2	0–1	—	—	—	—	0–5	2–3	0–1	—	0–0	—	—	1–3	—
Pachuca Juniors	5–0	—	3–2	—	6–0	—	—	—	2–1	6–0	—	1–0	—	—	2–0	—
Puebla	3–2	—	1–0	—	1–1	—	—	—	—	2–2	1–0	—	0–2	1–2	1–5	—
Pumas Naucalpan	2–2	—	—	1–0	1–1	4–0	—	—	—	—	2–2	—	2–1	—	—	2–0
Pumas Prepa	—	3–0	—	2–0	—	1–0	2–0	1–5	—	—	—	2–4	—	1–0	—	1–1
Tecamachalco	1–3	—	2–0	—	4–1	—	—	—	0–1	0–3	—	—	4–1	3–2	1–1	—
Garzas UAEH	—	2–1	—	0–0	—	—	1–3	1–4	—	—	1–2	—	—	3–1	—	0–0
Potros UAEM	1–1	3–1	—	—	0–0	1–0	1–0	1–3	—	0–1	—	—	—	—	—	—
Universidad del Fútbol	2–0	—	—	5–1	3–1	—	—	—	—	2–1	2–0	—	0–1	3–2	—	1–0
Zacatepec	—	0–0	—	4–2	—	0–1	5–3	3–2	3–2	—	—	3–0	—	2–2	—	—

Source: Liga BBVA MX
Legend: Blue = home team win; Yellow = draw; Red = away team win.

==== Bajío Zone ====
===== League table =====
Pos	Team	Pld	W	D	L	GF	GA	GD	Pts	Qualification or relegation
1	Querétaro	14	11	0	3	35	18	+17	33	Liguilla de Ascenso
2	Necaxa Rayos	14	9	2	3	34	17	+17	31	Liguilla de Ascenso
3	Cruz Azul Jasso	14	9	3	2	27	12	+15	31	Liguilla de Ascenso
4	Unión de Curtidores	14	8	2	4	32	20	+12	27	
5	Toluca	14	6	6	2	24	14	+10	26	Liguilla de Filiales
6	Atlético Cuauhtémoc	14	5	6	3	20	20	0	24	
7	Irapuato	14	6	3	5	24	27	−3	23	
8	Soles de Acolman	14	7	1	6	17	18	−1	22	
9	Teca Huixquilucan	14	6	2	6	30	33	−3	21	
10	Titanes de Tulancingo	14	4	3	7	20	21	−1	17	
11	Cadereyta	14	3	3	8	12	20	−8	14	
12	Toros de Zacatecas	14	4	2	8	14	23	−9	14	
13	Cachorros León	14	2	4	8	16	26	−10	13	
14	Petroleros de Salamanca	14	3	3	8	24	36	−12	13	
15	Halcones del Valle del Mezquital	14	2	0	12	16	42	−26	6	

Source: RSSSF

===== Results =====
Home \ Away	ATC	CAC	CAD	CAJ	HVM	IRA	NEC	QUE	SAL	SOL	TCH	TOL	TOR	TUL	UDC
Atlético Cuauhtémoc	—	1–0	0–2	—	4–3	—	—	2–1	2–1	0–1	—	0–0	—	—	—
Cachorros León	—	—	—	0–2	—	1–2	1–0	—	—	—	3–3	—	4–1	2–2	0–3
Cadereyta	—	1–1	—	0–1	—	—	—	—	—	2–0	1–1	0–0	0–1	—	1–3
Cruz Azul Jasso	1–1	—	—	—	4–0	1–1	1–2	2–1	—	—	—	—	5–1	3–1	—
Halcones VM	—	3–2	2–1	—	—	—	—	0–3	2–5	1–3	0–2	2–4	—	—	—
Irapuato	1–1	—	3–2	—	5–2	—	2–3	1–2	2–4	—	—	—	—	1–0	—
Necaxa Rayos	1–1	—	1–0	—	4–0	—	—	4–0	4–1	3–1	—	2–2	—	—	—
Querétaro	—	2–0	4–0	—	—	—	—	—	6–1	2–1	3–2	3–0	—	—	4–3
Salamanca	—	2–2	0–2	1–2	—	—	—	—	—	2–2	1–2	0–4	—	—	2–2
Soles de Acolman	—	1–0	—	1–2	—	1–0	—	—	—	—	2–1	1–0	0–1	—	3–2
Teca Huixquilucan	7–5	—	—	1–2	—	1–2	2–7	—	—	—	—	—	3–2	1–0	2–0
Toluca	—	3–2	—	1–1	—	1–1	—	—	—	—	5–2	—	0–0	1–0	3–0
Toros de Zacatecas	1–2	—	—	—	1–0	1–2	1–2	0–1	1–0	—	—	—	—	2–2	—
Tulancingo	0–0	—	3–0	—	1–0	—	3–1	2–3	3–4	2–0	—	—	—	—	—
Unión de Curtidores	—	2–2	0–1	—	—	—	—	4–0	2–1	2–1	2–1	2–0	—	—	—

Source: Liga BBVA MX
Legend: Blue = home team win; Yellow = draw; Red = away team win.

==== Western Zone ====
===== League table =====
Pos	Team	Pld	W	D	L	GF	GA	GD	Pts	Qualification or relegation
1	Atlético Cihuatlán	14	10	2	2	37	19	+18	32	Liguilla de Ascenso
2	Soccer Manzanillo	14	8	5	1	39	17	+22	31	Liguilla de Ascenso
3	Vaqueros	14	6	7	1	22	16	+6	29	Liguilla de Ascenso
4	Delfines de Los Cabos	14	7	3	4	19	25	−6	25	
5	Atlas	14	7	1	6	18	16	+2	23	
6	Guadalajara	14	4	6	4	25	26	−1	22	Liguilla de Filiales
7	Chivas San Rafael	14	5	3	6	16	15	+1	21	Liguilla de Filiales
8	Deportivo Autlán	14	6	3	5	20	20	0	21	
9	UAG Tecomán	14	3	6	5	14	15	−1	19	
10	Cachorros UdeG	14	4	5	5	25	31	−6	18	
11	Búhos de Hermosillo	14	4	3	7	12	21	−9	17	
12	Dorados Los Mochis	14	3	5	6	18	18	0	16	
13	Monarcas Morelia	14	3	4	7	24	27	−3	15	Liguilla de Filiales
14	Jaguares de Zamora	14	2	4	8	16	30	−14	14	
15	Palmeros de Colima	14	1	7	6	14	23	−9	12	

Source: RSSSF

===== Results =====
Home \ Away	ATL	CIH	AUT	BUH	CUG	CHI	DEL	DLM	GUA	JAZ	MON	PAL	SMZ	UAG	VAQ
Atlas	—	1–2	0–2	—	0–0	—	6–2	—	2–0	1–0	—	—	—	0–2	—
Atlético Cihuatlán	—	—	3–1	—	—	1–2	3–0	—	3–3	—	—	2–0	2–4	—	5–0
Deportivo Autlán	—	—	—	1–0	—	1–0	4–2	1–1	—	—	—	1–0	0–3	—	1–1
Búhos de Hermosillo	1–2	1–2	—	—	1–3	—	—	2–1	—	1–1	1–0	—	—	2–1	—
Cachorros UdeG	—	1–4	2–2	—	—	—	2–3	—	1–1	2–1	—	—	—	1–0	3–3
Chivas San Rafael	0–1	—	—	3–0	1–1	—	—	0–0	—	—	2–2	2–0	0–1	—	—
Delfines de Los Cabos	—	—	—	2–0	—	2–1	—	2–1	—	—	1–0	1–0	0–0	—	0–0
Dorados Los Mochis	1–0	2–3	—	—	0–2	—	—	—	1–2	5–1	3–1	—	—	0–0	—
Guadalajara	—	—	2–1	0–2	—	0–2	6–1	—	—	—	—	2–2	5–5	—	0–3
Jaguares de Zamora	—	1–1	0–2	—	—	3–1	0–1	—	0–1	—	—	—	—	2–1	0–0
Monarcas Morelia	0–2	2–4	3–1	—	6–3	—	—	—	3–3	4–1	—	—	—	0–0	—
Palmeros de Colima	1–2	—	—	1–1	4–3	—	—	1–1	—	2–2	2–2	—	—	0–0	—
Soccer Manzanillo	3–0	—	—	4–0	5–1	—	—	1–1	—	8–4	2–0	1–1	—	—	—
UAG Tecomán	—	1–2	3–2	—	—	0–1	2–2	—	0–0	—	—	—	2–1	—	2–2
Vaqueros	2–1	—	—	0–0	—	3–1	—	2–1	—	—	2–1	3–0	1–1	—	—

Source: Liga BBVA MX
Legend: Blue = home team win; Yellow = draw; Red = away team win.

==== Northern Zone ====
===== League table =====
Pos	Team	Pld	W	D	L	GF	GA	GD	Pts	Qualification or relegation
1	Dorados UACH	15	11	2	2	26	12	+14	36	Liguilla de Ascenso
2	Bravos de Nuevo Laredo	15	10	3	2	29	19	+10	36	Liguilla de Ascenso
3	U.A. Tamaulipas	15	10	2	3	32	17	+15	33	Liguilla de Ascenso
4	Rayados 2a	15	9	3	3	23	13	+10	31	Liguilla de Filiales
5	Tampico Madero	15	8	4	3	20	11	+9	30	
6	Altamira	15	7	2	6	27	22	+5	25	
7	Atlético Lagunero	15	6	4	5	19	15	+4	25	
8	Deportivo Durango	15	6	3	6	19	18	+1	22	
9	Excélsior	15	4	5	6	24	28	−4	21	
10	Huracanes de Matamoros	15	4	6	5	15	17	−2	20	
11	Unión Piedras Negras	15	1	8	6	17	28	−11	15	
12	Cachorros UANL	15	3	4	8	14	26	−12	15	Liguilla de Filiales
13	Millonarios de La Joya	15	2	5	8	14	27	−13	14	
14	Santos Laguna	15	3	4	8	22	25	−3	13	
15	Indios	15	3	3	9	15	22	−7	13	
16	Zorros de Reynosa	15	2	4	9	10	26	−16	11	

Source: RSSSF

===== Results =====
Home \ Away	ALT	ALG	BRA	CNL	DUC	DUR	EXC	HUR	IND	MLJ	RAY	SAN	TAM	UPN	UAT	ZOR
Altamira	—	—	—	—	—	2–0	3–0	1–2	—	3–1	—	3–2	0–1	—	2–1	—
Atlético Lagunero	0–1	—	1–2	—	—	—	3–0	3–2	2–1	—	0–0	—	—	4–0	—	2–1
Bravos	3–1	—	—	—	—	1–3	2–2	2–1	—	3–1	—	2–1	1–0	—	—	—
Cachorros UANL	2–1	0–3	0–2	—	—	—	—	3–2	2–0	—	0–2	—	—	1–1	—	1–1
Dorados UACH	1–0	2–0	3–0	1–0	—	—	—	—	2–1	—	2–1	—	—	2–1	—	4–1
Durango	—	1–1	—	2–1	1–1	—	—	—	1–0	—	—	1–1	1–0	2–1	1–2	—
Excélsior	—	—	—	1–1	1–2	1–3	—	—	3–0	4–1	—	3–2	2–2	—	2–5	—
Huracanes de Matamoros	—	—	—	—	0–0	2–1	1–0	—	0–0	1–1	—	1–0	1–1	—	0–1	—
Indios	1–3	—	2–2	—	—	—	—	—	—	—	0–1	2–3	0–1	—	1–0	3–1
Millonarios La Joya	—	1–0	—	1–1	1–2	2–1	—	—	0–3	—	—	0–0	1–2	—	2–3	—
Rayados 2a	4–3	—	2–3	—	—	2–1	2–2	2–0	—	2–0	—	—	2–0	—	—	—
Santos Laguna	—	0–0	—	6–1	0–2	—	—	—	—	—	0–1	—	—	3–3	4–1	0–1
Tampico Madero	—	0–0	—	1–0	3–2	—	—	—	—	—	—	4–0	—	2–0	1–1	2–0
Unión Piedras Negras	2–2	—	1–4	—	—	—	1–1	2–2	1–1	1–1	0–0	—	—	—	—	3–0
U.A. Tamaulipas	—	4–0	1–1	2–1	2–0	—	—	—	—	—	2–1	—	—	3–0	—	4–1
Zorros de Reynosa	2–2	—	0–1	—	—	1–0	0–2	0–0	—	1–1	0–1	—	—	—	—	—

Source: Liga BBVA MX
Legend: Blue = home team win; Yellow = draw; Red = away team win.

=== Liguilla de Ascenso ===
Round of 16
6	Atlético Cihuatlán	2	4	6
9	Soccer Manzanillo	1	0	1
11	Cruz Azul Jasso	2	3	5
15	TR Córdoba	0	2	2
4	Querétaro	1	2	3
10	Necaxa Rayos	1	1	2
3	Bravos	0	1	1
5	U.A. Tamaulipas	2	0	2
1	Pachuca Juniors	1	5	6
16	Guerreros de Tabasco	1	1	2
2	Dorados UACH	1	1	2
13	Vaqueros	2	1	3
12	Mérida	1	2	3
8	Pumas Naucalpan	2	0	2
17	Pioneros de Cancún	0	0	0
7	Universidad del Fútbol	3	1	4

Quarter-finals
6	Atlético Cihuatlán	1	5	6
11	Cruz Azul Jasso	0	1	1
4	Querétaro	2	1	3
5	U.A. Tamaulipas	4	2	6
1	Pachuca Juniors	2	2	4
13	Vaqueros	2	0	2
12	Mérida	1	4	5
7	Universidad del Fútbol	4	2	6

Semi-finals
6	Atlético Cihuatlán	1	2	3
5	U.A. Tamaulipas	0	1	1
1	Pachuca Juniors	1	1	2
7	Universidad del Fútbol	1	2	3

Final
6	Atlético Cihuatlán	0	0	0
7	Universidad del Fútbol	1	0	1

==== Round of 16 ====
Team 1	Agg.	Team 2	1st leg	2nd leg
Atlético Cihuatlán	6–1	Soccer Manzanillo	2–1	4–0
Cruz Azul Jasso	5–2	TR Córdoba	2–0	3–2
Querétaro	3–2	Necaxa Rayos	1–1	2–1
Bravos	1–2	U.A. Tamaulipas	0–2	1–0
Pachuca Juniors	6–2	Guerreros de Tabasco	1–1	5–1
Dorados UACH	2–3	Vaqueros	1–2	1–1
Mérida	3–2	Pumas Naucalpan	1–2	2–0
Pioneros de Cancún	0–4	Universidad del Fútbol	0–3	0–1

===== First leg =====
23 April 2008	Universidad del Fútbol	3–0	Pioneros de Cancún	Pachuca
12:00	Peña 11'; Flores 25'; Guzmán 56'	Report		Stadium: Estadio Hidalgo; Attendance: 200; Referee: Uriel Olvera Ríos

23 April 2008	TR Córdoba	0–2	Cruz Azul Jasso	Córdoba
15:00		Report	Trillo 37'; Jiménez 44'	Stadium: Estadio Rafael Murillo Vidal; Attendance: 2,000; Referee: Osvaldo Sánchez Huerta

23 April 2008	Vaqueros	2–1	Dorados UACH	Ixtlán del Río
19:45	Pozos 21'; Núñez 53'	Report	Valdéz 12'	Stadium: Unidad Deportiva Roberto Gómez Reyes; Attendance: 300; Referee: Luis Enrique Santander Aguirre

23 April 2008	U.A. Tamaulipas	2–0	Bravos	Ciudad Victoria
20:30	J. Ramírez 86'; Castro 89'	Report		Stadium: Estadio Marte R. Gómez; Attendance: 500; Referee: Félix Augusto López Carrillo

24 April 2008	Pumas Naucalpan	2–1	Mérida	Mexico City
11:00	Rodríguez 16'; Barrón 41'	Report	Herrera 24'	Stadium: Instalaciones de La Cantera; Attendance: 200; Referee: Jorge Luis Delgado Salas

24 April 2008	Soccer Manzanillo	1–2	Atlético Cihuatlán	Manzanillo
15:00	Flores 5'	Report	Rebolledo 32'; Sánchez 60'	Stadium: Estadio Gustavo Vázquez Montes; Attendance: 2,500; Referee: Óscar Bernardo Villagómez Gurría

24 April 2008	Guerreros de Tabasco	1–1	Pachuca Juniors	Tenosique
15:00	Treviño 89'	Report	Estrada 12'	Stadium: Estadio Ángel 'Gello' Zubieta Valenzuela; Attendance: 800; Referee: Roberto Ríos Jácome

24 April 2008	Necaxa Rayos	1–1	Querétaro	Aguascalientes City
16:00	Medellín 46'	Report	Estrada 36'	Stadium: Instalaciones Casa Club Necaxa; Attendance: 100; Referee: Arturo Serratos Alcaraz

===== Second leg =====
26 April 2008	Cruz Azul Jasso	3–2 (5–2 agg.)	TR Córdoba	Ciudad Cooperativa Cruz Azul
11:00	García 35'; Herrera 87', 88'	Report	Campuzano 6'; Molina 55'	Stadium: Estadio 10 de Diciembre; Attendance: 300; Referee: Ángel Monroy Bello

26 April 2008	Pioneros de Cancún	0–1 (0–4 agg.)	Universidad del Fútbol	Cancún
15:00		Report	Cruz 76'	Stadium: Estadio Cancún 86; Attendance: 350; Referee: Aldo Iván Martínez Ruíz

26 April 2008	Dorados UACH	1–1 (a.e.t.) (2–3 agg.)	Vaqueros	Chihuahua City
19:00	Seceñas 75'	Report	Burciaga 97'	Stadium: Estadio Olímpico Universitario José Reyes Baeza; Attendance: 3,500; Referee: Javier Orlando Félix Valencia

26 April 2008	Bravos	1–0 (1–2 agg.)	U.A. Tamaulipas	Nuevo Laredo
20:00	Vázquez 78'	Report		Stadium: Unidad Deportiva Benito Juárez; Attendance: 3,500; Referee: Osvaldo Hernández Cobos

27 April 2008	Atlético Cihuatlán	4–0 (6–1 agg.)	Soccer Manzanillo	Cihuatlán
12:00	Rebolledo 21', 40'; Sánchez 44', 57'	Report		Stadium: Estadio El Llanito; Attendance: 3,000; Referee: Armando Ramiro Rojas Díaz

27 April 2008	Querétaro	2–1 (3–2 agg.)	Necaxa Rayos	Querétaro City
12:00	García 22', 66'	Report	Valdés 68'	Stadium: Estadio Corregidora; Attendance: 6,000; Referee: Jaime Alberto Mendoza García

27 April 2008	Pachuca Juniors	5–1 (6–2 agg.)	Guerreros de Tabasco	Pachuca
12:00	Cortés 25'; Cortés 34'; Fernández 75'; Estrada 81'; Brambila 84'	Report	Llergo 59'	Stadium: Estadio Hidalgo; Attendance: 200; Referee: Erick Yair Miranda Galindo

27 April 2008	Mérida	2–0 (3–2 agg.)	Pumas Naucalpan	Tamanché
14:00	Pérez 31'; Hernández 68'	Report		Stadium: Unidad Deportiva Tamanché; Attendance: 300; Referee: Jorge Alberto Díaz González

==== Quarter-finals ====
Team 1	Agg.	Team 2	1st leg	2nd leg
Atlético Cihuatlán	6–1	Cruz Azul Jasso	1–0	5–1
Querétaro	3–6	U.A. Tamaulipas	2–4	1–2
Pachuca Juniors	4–2	Vaqueros	2–2	2–0
Mérida	5–6	Universidad del Fútbol	1–4	4–2

===== First leg =====
1 May 2008	U.A. Tamaulipas	4–2	Querétaro	Ciudad Victoria
12:00	J. Ramírez 1'; Barrientos 10'; Fernández 40'; R. Ramírez 57'	Report	M. Ramírez 61'; Villa 66'	Stadium: Estadio Marte R. Gómez; Attendance: 3,000; Referee: Luis Manuel Zermeño Román

1 May 2008	Universidad del Fútbol	4–1	Mérida	Pachuca
12:00	Guzmán 35', 55', 72'; Flores 49'	Report	Rodríguez 27'	Stadium: Estadio Hidalgo; Attendance: 150; Referee: Daniel Alejandro Martínez Ruíz

1 May 2008	Cruz Azul Jasso	0–1	Atlético Cihuatlán	Mexico City
15:00		Report	Alba 6'	Stadium: Instalaciones de La Noria; Attendance: 300; Referee: Gerardo Díaz Morales

1 May 2008	Vaqueros	2–2	Pachuca Juniors	Ixtlán del Río
19:45	Villa 36'; Lara 53'	Report	Pérez 7'; Mañón 70'	Stadium: Unidad Deportiva Roberto Gómez Reyes; Attendance: 1,000; Referee: Oscar Macías Romo

===== Second leg =====
4 May 2008	Querétaro	1-2 (3–6 agg.)	U.A. Tamaulipas	Querétaro City
12:00	Lortia 59'	Report	Portillo 35'; J. Ramírez 89'	Stadium: Estadio Corregidora; Attendance: 5,000; Referee: Álvaro Ernesto Dávila Palomera

4 May 2008	Atlético Cihuatlán	5–1 (6–1 agg.)	Cruz Azul Jasso	Cihuatlán
12:00	Lona 41' (own); Rebolledo 47', 63'; Macías 52'; Vizcarra 78'	Report	Campuzano 74'	Stadium: Estadio El Llanito; Attendance: 2,500; Referee: Henry Ulises The Ávila

4 May 2008	Mérida	4–2 (5–6 agg.)	Universidad del Fútbol	Tamanché
14:00	Silva 10'; Alday 54', 61', 86'	Report	Cruz 66'; Flores 73'	Stadium: Unidad Deportiva Tamanché; Attendance: 600; Referee: Javier Moctezuma Nolasco

4 May 2008	Pachuca Juniors	2–0 (4–2 agg.)	Vaqueros	Pachuca
19:30	Mañón 38', 60'	Report		Stadium: Estadio Hidalgo; Attendance: 200; Referee: Jorge Alberto Díaz González

==== Semi-finals ====
Team 1	Agg.	Team 2	1st leg	2nd leg
Atlético Cihuatlán	3–1	U.A. Tamaulipas	1–0	2–1
Pachuca Juniors	2–3	Universidad del Fútbol	1–1	1–2

===== First leg =====
8 May 2008	Universidad del Fútbol	1–1	Pachuca Juniors	Pachuca
18:00	Flores 39'	Report	Mañón 61'	Stadium: Estadio Hidalgo; Attendance: 500; Referee: Erick Yair Miranda Galindo

8 May 2008	U.A. Tamaulipas	0–1	Atlético Cihuatlán	Ciudad Victoria
20:00	J. Ramírez 6', 42'; R. Ramírez 80'	Report	Vizcarra 86'	Stadium: Estadio Marte R. Gómez; Attendance: 3,000; Referee: Miguel Ángel Ayala Ramírez

===== Second leg =====
11 May 2008	Atlético Cihuatlán	2–1 (3–1 agg.)	U.A. Tamaulipas	Cihuatlán
12:00	Vizcarra 47'; Tapia 70'	Report	Ramírez 54'	Stadium: Estadio El Llanito; Attendance: 10,000; Referee: Jaime Alberto Mendoza García

11 May 2008	Pachuca Juniors	1–2 (2–3 agg.)	Universidad del Fútbol	Pachuca
18:00	Cortés 76'	Report	Cruz 73'; Peña 83'	Stadium: Estadio Hidalgo; Attendance: 1,500; Referee: León Vicente Barajas Anzures

==== Final ====
Team 1	Agg.	Team 2	1st leg	2nd leg
Atlético Cihuatlán	0–1	Universidad del Fútbol	0–1	0–0

===== First leg =====
15 May 2008	Universidad del Fútbol	1–0	Atlético Cihuatlán	Pachuca
18:00		Report		Stadium: Estadio Hidalgo

===== Second leg =====
18 May 2008	Atlético Cihuatlán	0–0 (0–1 agg.)	Universidad del Fútbol	Cihuatlán
12:00		Report		Stadium: Estadio El Llanito; Attendance: 5,000; Referee: Jorge Eduardo Gasso Flores

Clausura 2008 winners
Universidad del Fútbol
1st title

=== Liguilla de Filiales ===
Quarter-finals
3	Toluca	2	2	4
6	Puebla	1	1	2
4	Guadalajara (pen.)	2	1	3 (3)
5	Chivas San Rafael	1	2	3 (0)
1	Rayados 2a	3	1	4
8	Cachorros UANL	2	1	3
2	Pumas Prepa	1	1	2
7	Monarcas Morelia	4	4	8

Semi-finals
3	Toluca	0	3	3
4	Guadalajara	2	2	4
1	Rayados 2a	3	4	7 (1)
7	Monarcas Morelia (pen.)	4	3	7 (1)

Final
4	Guadalajara	2	4	6
7	Monarcas Morelia	1	3	4

== Promotion Final ==
The Promotion Final is a series of matches played by the champions of the tournaments Apertura and Clausura, the game is played to determine the winning team of the promotion to Liga de Ascenso. The first leg was played on 22 May 2008, and the second leg was played on 25 May 2008.

Team 1	Agg.	Team 2	1st leg	2nd leg
Pachuca Juniors	6–1	Universidad del Fútbol	2–0	4–1

=== First leg ===
22 May 2008	Universidad del Fútbol	0–2	Pachuca Juniors	Pachuca
18:00		Report	Brambila 2', 36'	Stadium: Estadio Hidalgo; Attendance: 3,000; Referee: Ángel Monroy Bello

=== Second leg ===
25 May 2008	Pachuca Juniors	4–1 (6–1 agg.)	Universidad del Fútbol	Pachuca
14:00	Brambila 8'; Torres 21', 28', 75'	Report	Valdéz 38'	Stadium: Estadio Hidalgo; Attendance: 3,500; Referee: Henry Ulises The Ávila

2007–08 winners
Pachuca Juniors
3rd title

Pachuca Juniors was the winner of the promotion to Primera División A, however, being a reserve team from Pachuca its license was put up for sale, finally the C.D. Irapuato bought the rights and was therefore promoted to the upper category.

== See also ==
- Primera División de México Apertura 2007
- Primera División de México Clausura 2008
- 2007–08 Primera División A season
