= List of Mexican football champions =

This is a list of Mexican football champions, consisting of all champions in each professional league of Mexican football. For men's football: Liga MX, Liga de Expansión MX, Liga Premier, Liga TDP and the defunct Ascenso MX. For women's football: Liga Femenil and Liga TDP Femenil.

== Liga MX champions ==
=== Annual table points format ===
Ed.	Season	Champions	Results	Runners-up
Liga Mayor
1	1943–44	Asturias	4–1 (t.b.)	Real España
2	1944–45	Real España	Round-robin	Puebla
3	1945–46	Veracruz	Round-robin	Atlante
4	1946–47	Atlante	Round-robin	León
5	1947–48	León	0–0; 2–0 (t.b.)	Oro
6	1948–49	León	Round-robin	Atlas
Primera División de México
7	1949–50	Veracruz	Round-robin	Atlante
8	1950–51	Atlas	Round-robin	Atlante
9	1951–52	León	Round-robin	Guadalajara
10	1952–53	Tampico	Round-robin	Zacatepec
11	1953–54	Marte	Round-robin	Oro
12	1954–55	Zacatepec	Round-robin	Guadalajara
13	1955–56	León	4–2 (t.b.)	Oro
14	1956–57	Guadalajara	Round-robin	Toluca
15	1957–58	Zacatepec	Round-robin	Toluca
16	1958–59	Guadalajara	Round-robin	León
17	1959–60	Guadalajara	Round-robin	América
18	1960–61	Guadalajara	Round-robin	Oro
19	1961–62	Guadalajara	Round-robin	América
20	1962–63	Oro	Round-robin	Guadalajara
21	1963–64	Guadalajara	Round-robin	América
22	1964–65	Guadalajara	Round-robin	Oro
23	1965–66	América	Round-robin	Atlas
24	1966–67	Toluca	Round-robin	América
25	1967–68	Toluca	Round-robin	Pumas UNAM
26	1968–69	Cruz Azul	Round-robin	Guadalajara
27	1969–70	Guadalajara	Round-robin	Cruz Azul
28	Mex–1970	Cruz Azul	Final group	Guadalajara

=== Final phase format (liguilla) ===
Ed.	Season	Champions	Results	Runners-up	Annual points leader
29	1970–71	América	0–0; 2–0	Toluca	América; 44 pts
30	1971–72	Cruz Azul	4–1	América	Cruz Azul; 51 pts
31	1972–73	Cruz Azul	1–1; 0–0; 2–1	León	Cruz Azul; 46 pts
32	1973–74	Cruz Azul	1–2; 3–0	Atlético Español	Cruz Azul; 49 pts
33	1974–75	Toluca	Final group	León	León; 51 pts
34	1975–76	América	3–0; 1–0	Leones Negros UdeG	América; 53 pts
35	1976–77	Pumas UNAM	0–0; 1–0	Leones Negros UdeG	Pumas UNAM; 50 pts
36	1977–78	Tigres UANL	2–0; 1–1	Pumas UNAM	América; 51 pts
37	1978–79	Cruz Azul	0–0; 2–0	Pumas UNAM	Cruz Azul; 51 pts
38	1979–80	Cruz Azul	1–0; 3–3	Tigres UANL	América; 57 pts
39	1980–81	Pumas UNAM	0–1; 4–1	Cruz Azul	Tecos; 51 pts
40	1981–82	Tigres UANL	2–1; 0–1 (3–1 p)	Atlante	Atlante; 53 pts
41	1982–83	Puebla	1–2; 1–0 (7–6 p)	Guadalajara	América; 61 pts
42	1983–84	América	2–2; 3–1	Guadalajara	América; 51 pts
43	1984–85	América	1–1; 0–0; 3–1	Pumas UNAM	Pumas UNAM; 55 pts
44	Prode–1985	América	1–4; 4–0 (a.e.t.)	Tampico Madero	Puebla; 37 pts
45	Mex–1986	Monterrey	1–2; 2–0 (a.e.t.)	Tampico Madero	Puebla; 37 pts
46	1986–87	Guadalajara	1–2; 3–0	Cruz Azul	Guadalajara; 55 pts
47	1987–88	América	0–1; 4–1	Pumas UNAM	América; 55 pts
48	1988–89	América	3–2; 2–2	Cruz Azul	Puebla; 53 pts
49	1989–90	Puebla	2–1; 4–3	Leones Negros UdeG	América; 48 pts
50	1990–91	Pumas UNAM	2–3; 1–0 (a.g.)	América	Pumas UNAM; 55 pts
51	1991–92	León	0–0; 2–0 (a.e.t.)	Puebla	Atlante; 50 pts
52	1992–93	Atlante	1–0; 3–0	Monterrey	Necaxa; 54 pts
53	1993–94	Tecos	0–1; 2–0 (a.e.t.)	Santos Laguna	Tecos; 51 pts
54	1994–95	Necaxa	1–1; 2–0	Cruz Azul	Guadalajara; 52 pts
55	1995–96	Necaxa	1–1; 0–0 (a.g.)	Atlético Celaya	Cruz Azul; 56 pts
56	Inv–1996	Santos Laguna	0–1; 4–2	Necaxa	Atlante; 66 pts
57	Ver–1997	Guadalajara	1–1; 6–1	Toros Neza	Atlante; 66 pts
58	Inv–1997	Cruz Azul	1–0; 1–1 (g.g.)	León	Cruz Azul; 61 pts
59	Ver–1998	Toluca	1–2; 5–2	Necaxa	Cruz Azul; 61 pts
60	Inv–1998	Necaxa	0–0; 2–0	Guadalajara	Toluca; 75 pts
61	Ver–1999	Toluca	3–3; 2–2 (5–4 p)	Atlas	Toluca; 75 pts
62	Inv–1999	Pachuca	2–2; 1–0 (g.g.)	Cruz Azul	Toluca; 72 pts
63	Ver–2000	Toluca	2–0; 5–1	Santos Laguna	Toluca; 72 pts
64	Inv–2000	Morelia	3–1; 0–2 (5–4 p)	Toluca	Cruz Azul; 55 pts
65	Ver–2001	Santos Laguna	1–2; 3–1	Pachuca	Cruz Azul; 55 pts
66	Inv–2001	Pachuca	2–0; 1–1	Tigres UANL	Toluca; 67 pts
67	Ver–2002	América	0–2; 3–0 (g.g.)	Necaxa	Toluca; 67 pts
68	Ape–2002	Toluca	0–1; 4–1	Morelia	Toluca; 74 pts
69	Cla–2003	Monterrey	3–1; 0–0	Morelia	Toluca; 74 pts
70	Ape–2003	Pachuca	3–1; 0–1	Tigres UANL	Pumas UNAM; 79 pts
71	Cla–2004	Pumas UNAM	1–1; 0–0 (5–4 p)	Guadalajara	Pumas UNAM; 79 pts
72	Ape–2004	Pumas UNAM	2–1; 1–0	Monterrey	Morelia; 57 pts
73	Cla–2005	América	1–1; 6–3	Tecos	Morelia; 57 pts
74	Ape–2005	Toluca	3–3; 3–0	Monterrey	Cruz Azul; 60 pts
75	Cla–2006	Pachuca	0–0; 1–0	San Luis	Cruz Azul; 60 pts
76	Ape–2006	Guadalajara	1–1; 2–1	Toluca	Pachuca; 65 pts
77	Cla–2007	Pachuca	2–1; 1–1	América	Pachuca; 65 pts
78	Ape–2007	Atlante	0–0; 2–1	Pumas UNAM	Santos Laguna; 69 pts
79	Cla–2008	Santos Laguna	2–1; 1–1	Cruz Azul	Santos Laguna; 69 pts
80	Ape–2008	Toluca	2–0; 0–2 (7–6 p)	Cruz Azul	Toluca; 63 pts
81	Cla–2009	Pumas UNAM	1–0; 2–2 (a.e.t.)	Pachuca	Toluca; 63 pts
82	Ape–2009	Monterrey	4–3; 2–1	Cruz Azul	Monterrey; 66 pts
83	Bic–2010	Toluca	2–2; 0–0 (4–3 p)	Santos Laguna	Monterrey; 66 pts
84	Ape–2010	Monterrey	2–3; 3–0	Santos Laguna	Cruz Azul; 65 pts
85	Cla–2011	Pumas UNAM	1–1; 2–1	Morelia	Cruz Azul; 65 pts
86	Ape–2011	Tigres UANL	1–0; 3–1	Santos Laguna	Tigres UANL; 59 pts
87	Cla–2012	Santos Laguna	1–1; 2–1	Monterrey	Tigres UANL; 59 pts
Liga MX
88	Ape–2012	Tijuana	2–1; 2–0	Toluca	América; 63 pts
89	Cla–2013	América	0–1; 2–1 (4–2 p)	Cruz Azul	América; 63 pts
90	Ape–2013	León	2–0; 3–1	América	Cruz Azul; 65 pts
91	Cla–2014	León	2–3; 2–0 (a.e.t.)	Pachuca	Cruz Azul; 65 pts
92	Ape–2014	América	0–1; 3–0	Tigres UANL	Tigres UANL; 60 pts
93	Cla–2015	Santos Laguna	5–0; 0–3	Querétaro	Tigres UANL; 60 pts
94	Ape–2015	Tigres UANL	3–0; 1–4 (4–2 p)	Pumas UNAM	Monterrey; 60 pts
95	Cla–2016	Pachuca	1–0; 1–1	Monterrey	Monterrey; 60 pts
96	Ape–2016	Tigres UANL	1–1; 1–1 (3–0 p)	América	Tijuana; 64 pts
97	Cla–2017	Guadalajara	2–2; 2–1	Tigres UANL	Tijuana; 64 pts
98	Ape–2017	Tigres UANL	1–1; 2–1	Monterrey	Monterrey; 66 pts
99	Cla–2018	Santos Laguna	2–1; 1–1	Toluca	Monterrey; 66 pts
100	Ape–2018	América	0–0; 2–0	Cruz Azul	Tigres UANL; 66 pts
101	Cla–2019	Tigres UANL	1–0; 0–0	León	Tigres UANL; 66 pts
102	Ape–2019	Monterrey	2–1; 1–2 (4–2 p)	América	León; 54 pts
103	Cla–2020	Unfinished tournament (Note: The tournament was declared unfinished due to the COVID-19 pandemic.)			León; 54 pts
104	Guard–2020	León	1–1; 2–0	Pumas UNAM	Cruz Azul; 70 pts
105	Guard–2021	Cruz Azul	1–0; 1–1	Santos Laguna	Cruz Azul; 70 pts
106	Ape–2021	Atlas	2–3; 1–0 (4–3 p)	León	Tigres UANL; 61 pts
107	Cla–2022	Atlas	2–0; 1–2	Pachuca	Tigres UANL; 61 pts
108	Ape–2022	Pachuca	5–1; 3–1	Toluca	Monterrey; 75 pts
109	Cla–2023	Tigres UANL	0–0; 3–2 (a.e.t.)	Guadalajara	Monterrey; 75 pts
110	Ape–2023	América	1–1; 3–0 (a.e.t.)	Tigres UANL	América; 75 pts
111	Cla–2024	América	1–1; 1–0	Cruz Azul	América; 75 pts
112	Ape–2024	América	2–1; 1–1	Monterrey	Cruz Azul; 75 pts
113	Cla–2025	Toluca	0–0; 2–0	América	Cruz Azul; 75 pts
114	Ape–2025	Toluca	0–1; 2–1 (9–8 p)	Tigres UANL	Cruz Azul; 68 pts
115	Cla–2026	Cruz Azul	0–0; 2–1	Pumas UNAM	Cruz Azul; 68 pts

== Ascenso MX champions ==
Ed.	Season	Champions	Results	Runners-up
Primera División "A" de México
1	1994–95	Atlético Celaya	0–0; 1–0 (a.e.t.)	Pachuca
2	1995–96	Pachuca	2–1; 2–1	Gallos de Hermosillo
3	Inv–1996	Tigres UANL	0–1; 3–0	Atlético Hidalgo
4	Ver–1997	Tigres UANL	0–1; 4–0	Correcaminos UAT
5	Inv–1997	Pachuca	2–1; 0–0	Real Sociedad de Zacatecas
6	Ver–1998	Tigrillos UANL	1–3; 3–0	Zacatepec
7	Inv–1998	Atlético Yucatán	0–0; 1–0	Chivas Tijuana
8	Ver–1999	Unión de Curtidores (Note: Not promoted due to Puebla bought the franchise of Unión de Curtidores.)	1–1; 2–1	Cruz Azul Hidalgo
9	Inv–1999	Irapuato	3–1; 2–2	Zacatepec
10	Ver–2000	Irapuato	2–2; 2–2 (4–2 p)	Cruz Azul Hidalgo
11	Inv–2000	Gallos de Aguascalientes	1–1; 5–3	La Piedad
12	Ver–2001	La Piedad	3–3; 4–2	Toros Neza
13	Inv–2001	Veracruz	2–2; 2–0	San Luis
14	Ver–2002	San Luis	1–4; 4–0 (a.e.t.)	Tigrillos UANL
15	Inv–2002	Irapuato	0–0; 0–0 (5–4 p)	La Piedad
16	Ver–2003	León	1–1; 2–1	Tapatío
17	Ape–2003	Dorados de Sinaloa	2–3; 5–3 (g.g.)	Cobras de Juárez
18	Cla–2004	León	1–0; 1–1	Dorados de Sinaloa
19	Ape–2004	San Luis	0–1; 3–1	Atlético Mexiquense
20	Cla–2005	Querétaro	2–1; 1–1	León
21	Ape–2005	Puebla	1–1; 1–0	Cruz Azul Hidalgo
22	Cla–2006	Querétaro	1–2; 2–1 (4–3 p)	Indios de Ciudad Juárez
23	Ape–2006	Puebla	1–1; 2–2 (6–5 p)	Salamanca
24	Cla–2007	Dorados de Sinaloa	1–3; 4–1	León
25	Ape–2007	Indios de Ciudad Juárez	3–0; 4–0	Dorados de Sinaloa
26	Cla–2008	León	2–2; 1–0	Dorados de Sinaloa
27	Ape–2008	Querétaro	0–0; 2–0	Irapuato
28	Cla–2009	Mérida	1–0; 0–0	Tijuana
Liga de Ascenso de México
29	Ape–2009	Necaxa	1–0; 3–3 (a.e.t.)	Irapuato
30	Bic–2010	Necaxa	3–0; 1–2	León
31	Ape–2010	Tijuana	2–0; 1–0	Veracruz
32	Cla–2011	Irapuato	1–1; 1–0	Tijuana
33	Ape–2011	Correcaminos UAT	3–1; 1–0	La Piedad
34	Cla–2012	León	3–3; 4–0	Lobos BUAP
Ascenso MX
35	Ape–2012	La Piedad (Note: Not promoted due to Veracruz bought the franchise of La Piedad.)	0–1; 3–1 (a.e.t.)	Dorados de Sinaloa
36	Cla–2013	Toros Neza	3–0; 1–0	Necaxa
37	Ape–2013	Leones Negros UdeG	1–0; 1–1	Necaxa
38	Cla–2014	Estudiantes Tecos	0–0; 1–1 (4–3 p)	Correcaminos UAT
39	Ape–2014	Necaxa	0–0; 4–4 (5–4 p)	Coras
40	Cla–2015	Dorados de Sinaloa	3–0; 0–1	Atlético San Luis
41	Ape–2015	Juárez	0–1; 3–0	Atlante
42	Cla–2016	Necaxa	2–0; 0–0	Mineros de Zacatecas
43	Ape–2016	Dorados de Sinaloa	3–2; 1–0	Atlante
44	Cla–2017	Lobos BUAP	2–1; 2–1	Juárez
45	Ape–2017	Alebrijes de Oaxaca	1–0; 1–2 (4–2 p)	Juárez
46	Cla–2018	Cafetaleros (Note: Not promoted due to the franchise did not obtain certification for promotion.)	1–0; 2–2	Leones Negros UdeG
47	Ape–2018	Atlético San Luis	0–1; 4–2 (a.e.t.)	Dorados de Sinaloa
48	Cla–2019	Atlético San Luis	1–1; 1–0 (a.e.t.)	Dorados de Sinaloa
49	Ape–2019	Alebrijes de Oaxaca	3–1; 2–2	Zacatepec
50	Cla–2020	Unfinished tournament		

== Liga de Expansión MX champions ==
Ed.	Season	Champions	Results	Runners-up
1	Guard–2020	Tampico Madero	1–1; 3–2 (a.e.t.)	Atlante
2	Guard–2021	Tepatitlán	1–1; 2–2	Atlético Morelia
3	Ape–2021	Atlante	0–0; 3–0	Tampico Madero
4	Cla–2022	Atlético Morelia	0–0; 2–0	Cimarrones de Sonora
5	Ape–2022	Atlante	0–0; 3–1 (a.e.t.)	Celaya
6	Cla–2023	Tapatío	2–1; 2–2 (a.e.t.)	Atlético Morelia
7	Ape–2023	Cancún	0–0; 3–0	Atlante
8	Cla–2024	Atlante	2–0; 2–1	Leones Negros UdeG
9	Ape–2024	Tapatío	2–1; 3–2	Celaya
10	Cla–2025	Leones Negros UdeG	1–2; 1–0 (5–4 p)	Jaiba Brava
11	Ape–2025	Jaiba Brava	0–0; 1–0	Irapuato
12	Cla–2026	Tepatitlán	0–0; 1–0	Jaiba Brava

== Liga Premier champions ==
=== Second level (1950–1994) ===
Ed.	Season	Champions	Runners-up
Segunda División de México
1	1950–51	Zacatepec	Zamora
2	1951–52	La Piedad	San Sebastián
3	1952–53	Toluca	Veracruz
4	1953–54	Irapuato	San Sebastián
5	1954–55	Atlas	Cuautla
6	1955–56	Monterrey	La Piedad
7	1956–57	Zamora	Atlético Morelia
8	1957–58	Celaya	Monterrey
9	1958–59	Tampico	Monterrey
10	1959–60	Monterrey	Ciudad Madero
11	1960–61	Nacional	Poza Rica
12	1961–62	Pumas UNAM	Ciudad Madero
13	1962–63	Zacatepec	Ciudad Madero
14	1963–64	Cruz Azul	Poza Rica
15	1964–65	Ciudad Madero	Poza Rica
16	1965–66	Nuevo León	Tampico
17	1966–67	Pachuca	Laguna
18	1967–68	Laguna	Zacatepec
19	1968–69	Torreón	Zacatepec
20	1969–70	Zacatepec	Nuevo León
21	Mex–1970	Unión de Curtidores	Puebla
22	1970–71	San Luis	Zamora
23	1971–72	Atlas	Tigres UANL
24	1972–73	Ciudad de Madero	Irapuato
25	1973–74	Tigres UANL	Leones Negros UdeG
26	1974–75	Tecos	Irapuato
27	1975–76	San Luis	Tecnológico de Celaya
28	1976–77	Atlante	Querétaro
29	1977–78	Zacatepec	Irapuato
30	1978–79	Atlas	Cuautla
31	1979–80	Atletas Campesinos	Osos Grises
32	1980–81	Atlético Morelia	Tapatío
33	1981–82	Oaxtepec	Tepic
34	1982–83	Unión de Curtidores	Zamora
35	1983–84	Zacatepec	Jalisco
36	1984–85	Irapuato	Pachuca
37	1985–86	Cobras de Querétaro	Pachuca
38	1986–87	Correcaminos UAT	Gallos Blancos UAQ
39	1987–88	Cobras de Juárez	León
40	1988–89	Potros Neza	Atlético Yucatán
41	1989–90	León	Inter de Tijuana
42	1990–91	Atlante	Pachuca
43	1991–92	Pachuca	Zacatepec
44	1992–93	Toros UTN	Tampico Madero
45	1993–94	Tampico Madero	Irapuato

=== Third level (1994–present) ===
Ed.	Season	Champions	Runners-up
46	1994–95	Cruz Azul Hidalgo	Atlético Bachilleres
47	1995–96	Tigrillos UANL	Tapatío
48	1996–97	Atlético Bachilleres	Gallos de Aguascalientes
49	Inv–1997	Zitácuaro	Gallos de Aguascalientes
50	Ver–1998	Gallos de Aguascalientes	Delfines de Xalapa
51	Inv–1998	Alacranes de Durango	Zitácuaro
52	Ver–1999	Alacranes de Durango	Marte Morelos
53	Inv–1999	Truenos de Cuautitlán	Tapatío
54	Ver–2000	Marte Morelos	Cihuatlán
55	Inv–2000	Águilas de Tamaulipas	Zitácuaro
56	Ver–2001	Zitácuaro	Cihuatlán
57	Inv–2001	Cihuatlán	Tapatío
58	Ver–2002	Astros de Ciudad Juárez	Tapatío
59	Ape–2002	Tepic	Real de la Plata
60	Cla–2003	Delfines de Coatzacoalcos	Tecamachalco
61	Ape–2003	Lobos BUAP	Truenos de Cuautitlán
62	Cla–2004	Pachuca Juniors	América Coapa
63	Ape–2004	Académicos	Guerreros de Autlán
64	Cla–2005	Académicos	Cachorros UdeG
65	Ape–2005	Delfines B	Pumas Naucalpan
66	Cla–2006	Pegaso Anahúac	Pénjamo-Irapuato
67	Ape–2006	Pachuca Juniors	Atlas B
68	Cla–2007	Cruz Azul Jasso	Necaxa Rayos
69	Ape–2007	Pachuca Juniors	Tiburones Rojos de Córdoba
70	Cla–2008	Universidad del Fútbol	Cihuatlán
71	Ape–2008	Mérida B	Loros UdeC
72	Cla–2009	Universidad del Fútbol	Dorados de Los Mochis
73	Ape–2009	Universidad del Fútbol	Altamira
74	Bic–2010	Universidad del Fútbol (Note: Not promoted due to the franchise was an affiliate team of CF Pachuca.)	Chivas Rayadas
75	In–2010	Celaya	Tampico Madero
76	Rev–2011	Chivas Rayadas	Nuevo Laredo
77	Ape–2011	Tulancingo	Tecamachalco
78	Cla–2012	Tulancingo (Note: Not promoted due to the franchise did not obtain the license for promotion and the league was reduced to 15 clubs.)	Tecamachalco
79	Ape–2012	Murciélagos	Tepic
80	Cla–2013	Ballenas Galeana Morelos	Unión de Curtidores
81	Ape–2013	Linces de Tlaxcala	Loros UdeC
82	Cla–2014	Atlético Coatzacoalcos (Note: Not promoted due to unclear stadium requirements.)	Unión de Curtidores
83	Ape–2014	Potros UAEM	Cimarrones de Sonora
84	Cla–2015	Loros UdeC	Cruz Azul Hidalgo
85	Ape–2015	Potros UAEM	Tlaxcala
86	Cla–2016	Tampico Madero	Murciélagos
87	Ape–2016	Tlaxcala	Irapuato
88	Cla–2017	Tlaxcala	Irapuato
Liga Premier
89	Ape–2017	Tepatitlán (Note: Not promoted due to unclear affiliation requirements.)	Irapuato
90	Cla–2018	Loros UdeC	La Piedad
91	2018–19	Loros UdeC (Note: Not promoted due to the franchise did not obtain the license for promotion.)	Tuzos UAZ
92	2019–20	Unfinished tournament	
93	2020–21	Irapuato (Note: The franchise was audited and its promotion was denied. The club was dissolved in September 2021.)	Cruz Azul Hidalgo
94	Ape–2021	Alacranes de Durango	Inter Playa del Carmen
95	Cla–2022	Mazorqueros	Cafetaleros
96	Ape–2022	Tuzos UAZ	Jaiba Brava
97	Cla–2023	Jaiba Brava (Note: The franchise was audited and its promotion was denied.)	Inter Playa del Carmen
98	2023–24	Jaiba Brava	Los Cabos United
99	Ape–2024	Aguacateros de Peribán	Irapuato
100	Cla–2025	Irapuato	Aguacateros de Peribán
101	2025–26	Deportiva Venados (Note: Not promoted due to Venados FC did not give its approval to allow its promotion, and their spot was taken by Durango.)	Alacranes de Durango

== Liga TDP champions ==
=== Third level (1967–1994) ===
Ed.	Season	Champions	Runners-up
Tercera División de México
1	1967–68	Zapata	Potros UAEM
2	1968–69	Naucalpan	Querétaro
3	1969–70	San Luis	Querétaro
4	Mex–1970	San Luis	Cuautla
5	1970–71	Lobos de Querétaro	Tecnológico de Celaya
6	1971–72	Orizaba	España Veracruz
7	1972–73	Tecos	Nuevo Necaxa
8	1973–74	Celaya	Tapatío
9	1974–75	Potros UAEM	Estudiantes de Querétaro
10	1975–76	TAMSA	Torreón
11	1976–77	Osos Grises	Universitario Xalapeño
12	1977–78	Zamora	UV de Coatzacoalcos
13	1978–79	Lobos de Tlaxcala	Leones de Río Blanco
14	1979–80	Oaxtepec	Águilas UPAEP
15	1980–81	Azucareros de Córdoba	Celaya
16	1981–82	Poza Rica	Celaya
17	1982–83	Atlético Tecomán	Gallos Blancos UAQ
18	1983–84	San Mateo Atenco	Loros UdeC
19	1984–85	Búfalos Curtidores	Arroceros de Chetumal
20	1985–86	Progreso de Cocula	Águila Progreso Industrial
21	1986–87	Águila Progreso Industrial	Alianza de Sayula
22	1987–88	Ecatepec	Loros UdeC
23	1988–89	Ayense	Grupo Yucatán
24	1989–90	Zitlaltepec	Cruz Azul Hidalgo
25	1990–91	Celaya	Gallos de Ciudad Juárez
26	1991–92	Atlético San Francisco	Delfines de Xalapa
27	1992–93	Colimense	Cruz Azul Oaxaca
28	1993–94	Tigrillos UANL	Coacalco

=== Fourth level (1994–present) ===
Ed.	Season	Champions	Runners-up
29	1994–95	Monterrey FAAC	Chalco
30	1995–96	Zitácuaro	—
31	1996–97	Real Cuautitlán	Diablos Azules de Guasave
32	1997–98	Cachorros de Sayula	Atlético Carmen
33	1998–99	Cihuatlán	Potros UAEM
34	1999–00	Chivas Verde Valle	Garzas UAEH
35	2000–01	Pumas Naucalpan	Atlético San Francisco
36	Inv–2001	Académicos	América Acoxpa
37	Ver–2002	Alacranes de Apatzingán	Tecamachalco B
38	Ape–2002	Tepic B	Azucareros de Tezonapa
39	Cla–2003	Inter Playa del Carmen	Tepic B
40	Ape–2003	Jersy Nay Ixcuintla	Tuxtepec
41	Cla–2004	Atlético Tecomán	Potros de Hierro Neza
42	Ape–2004	Autlán B	Cacaoteros de Tabasco
43	Cla–2005	Atlético Cuauhtémoc	América Zapata
44	Ape–2005	Tecamachalco	Sufacen Tepic
45	Cla–2006	Soccer Manzanillo	Inter de Xalapa
46	Ape–2006	Búhos de Hermosillo	Potros de Hierro Neza
47	Cla–2007	Cihuatlán	Itzaes
48	Ape–2007	Atlético Comonfort	Teca Huixquilucan
49	Cla–2008	Soccer Manzanillo B	Cruz Azul Xochimilco
50	2008–09	Héroes de Caborca	Cruz Azul Xochimilco
51	2009–10	Patriotas de Córdoba	América Manzanillo
52	2010–11	Vaqueros Ixtlán	Club Santos Casino
53	2011–12	Real Cuautitlán	Calor de San Pedro
54	2012–13	Poblado Miguel Alemán	Tecamachalco Sur
55	2013–14	Tuzos Pachuca	Real Zamora
56	2014–15	Aguacateros CDU	Sporting Canamy
57	2015–16	Leones Negros UdeG C	Valle Verde Jiquipilas
58	2016–17	Tecos	Sporting Canamy
Liga TDP
59	2017–18	Acatlán	Marina
60	2018–19	Héroes de Zaci	Atlético San Francisco
61	2019–20	Unfinished tournament	
62	2020–21	Fuertes de Fortín	Club RC-1128
63	2021–22	Mazorqueros B	Deportiva Venados
64	2022–23	Aguacateros de Peribán	Atlético Aragón
65	2023–24	Faraones de Texcoco	Acatlán
66	2024–25	Héroes de Zaci	Atlético Cocula
67	2025–26	Delfines de Coatzacoalcos	Saltillo Soccer

== Liga Femenil champions ==
Ed.	Season	Champions	Results	Runners-up
1	Ape–2017	Guadalajara	0–2; 3–0	Pachuca
2	Cla–2018	Tigres UANL	2–2; 2–2 (4–2 p)	Monterrey
3	Ape–2018	América	2–2; 1–1 (3–1 p)	Tigres UANL
4	Cla–2019	Tigres UANL	1–1; 2–1	Monterrey
5	Ape–2019	Monterrey	1–1; 1–0	Tigres UANL
6	Cla–2020	Unfinished tournament		
7	Guard–2020	Tigres UANL	1–0; 0–1 (3–1 p)	Monterrey
8	Guard–2021	Tigres UANL	2–1; 5–3	Guadalajara
9	Ape–2021	Monterrey	2–2; 0–0 (3–1 p)	Tigres UANL
10	Cla–2022	Guadalajara	4–2; 0–1	Pachuca
11	Ape–2022	Tigres UANL	1–0; 2–0	América
12	Cla–2023	América	2–1; 2–1	Pachuca
13	Ape–2023	Tigres UANL	3–0; 0–0	América
14	Cla–2024	Monterrey	0–1; 2–1 (4–3 p)	América
15	Ape–2024	Monterrey	0–1; 3–2 (4–3 p)	Tigres UANL
16	Cla–2025	Pachuca	3–0; 0–2	América
17	Ape–2025	Tigres UANL	3–3; 1–0	América
18	Cla–2026	América	0–1; 3–0	Monterrey

== Liga TDP Femenil champions ==
Ed.	Season	Champions	Results	Runners-up
1	2024–25	Atlético Aragón	1–1; 1–0	Halcones
2	2025–26	Atlético Cuernavaca	0–1; 3–0	Zamora

== See also ==
- Football in Mexico
- Mexican football league system
- Mexican Football Federation
- List of football clubs in Mexico by major honours won
- Liga MX
- Liga de Expansión MX
- Ascenso MX
- Liga Premier
- Liga TDP
- Liga Femenil
