= 2006–07 Mexican Segunda División season =

Segunda División de México
- Season: 2006–07
- Dates: 26 August 2006 – 26 May 2007
- Champions: Apertura: Pachuca Juniors; Clausura; Cruz Azul Jasso
- Promoted: Pachuca Juniors
- Relegated: Vaqueros de Reynosa
- Stats are from the regular season only

The 2006–07 Segunda División de México season was split in two tournaments Apertura and Clausura. Segunda División was the third-tier football league of Mexico. The season was played between 26 August 2006 and 26 May 2007.

== Teams ==
=== South Zone ===
Location of teams in the 2006–07 Segunda División Southern Zone

Club	City	Stadium	Capacity
Académicos UGM	Orizaba, Veracruz	Universitario UGM	1,200
Albinegros de Orizaba	Orizaba, Veracruz	Socum	7,000
Alebrijes de Oaxaca	Oaxaca City, Oaxaca	Benito Juárez	12,000
Guerreros de Tabasco	Tenosique, Tabasco	Ángel 'Gello' Zubieta Valenzuela	2,000
Inter Playa del Carmen	Playa del Carmen, Quintana Roo	Mario Villanueva Madrid	7,500
Itzaes Yucatán	Mérida, Yucatán	Carlos Iturralde	15,087
Jaguares de Tabasco	Comalcalco, Tabasco	Antonio Valenzuela Alamilla	1,000
Limoneros de Río Grande	Río Grande, Oaxaca	Inocente Santos Luna	1,000
Ocelotes UNACH	Tapachula, Chiapas	Olímpico de Tapachula	11,000
Pioneros de Cancún	Cancún, Quintana Roo	Cancún 86	6,390
Tiburones Rojos de Córdoba	Córdoba, Veracruz	Rafael Murillo Vidal	3,800

=== Central Zone ===
Location of teams in the 2007–08 Segunda División Central Zone

Club	City	Stadium	Capacity
América Coapa	Mexico City	Instalaciones Club América en Coapa	2,000
Astros de Cuernavaca	Cuernavaca, Morelos	Centenario	14,800
Atlético Tapatío–Chalco	Chalco, State of Mexico	Arreola	2,500
Ballenas Galeana Morelos	Xochitepec, Morelos	Mariano Matamoros	16,000
Cuautitlán	Cuautitlán, State of Mexico	Los Pinos	5,000
Cuautla	Cuautla, Morelos	Isidro Gil Tapia	5,000
Gallos Blancos de Izcalli	Cuautitlán Izcalli, State of Mexico	Hugo Sánchez Márquez	3,500
Lobos Prepa	Puebla City, Puebla	Universitario BUAP	19,283
Pachuca Juniors	Pachuca, Hidalgo	Hidalgo	27,512
Pachuca Tuzos	Pachuca, Hidalgo	Hidalgo	27,512
Potros UAEM	Toluca, State of Mexico	Universitario Alberto "Chivo" Córdoba	32,603
Puebla	Puebla City, Puebla	Cuauhtémoc	42,648
Pumas Naucalpan	Mexico City	La Cantera	2,000
Pumas Prepa	Mexico City	La Cantera	2,000
Tecamachalco	Huixquilucan, State of Mexico	Alberto Pérez Navarro; Neza 86	3,000; 20,000
Garzas UAEH	Pachuca, Hidalgo	Revolución Mexicana	3,500

=== Bajío Zone ===
Location of teams in the 2006–07 Segunda División Bajío Zone

Club	City	Stadium	Capacity
Atlético Cuauhtémoc	Aguascalientes City, Aguascalientes	Universidad Cuauhtémoc	1,000
Aztecas Celaya	Celaya, Guanajuato	Miguel Alemán Valdés	23,182
Cachorros León	León, Guanajuato	Nou Camp	31,297
Cruz Azul Jasso	Ciudad Cooperativa Cruz Azul, Hidalgo	10 de Diciembre	7,761
Halcones de San Juan del Río	San Juan del Río, Querétaro	Unidad Deportiva Maquío	1,000
Halcones de Tlaxcala	Tlaxcala City, Tlaxcala	Tlahuicole	7,000
Halcones del Valle del Mezquital	Tezontepec, Hidalgo	San Juan	3,000
Irapuato	Irapuato, Guanajuato	Sergio León Chávez	25,000
Leones Amecameca	Amecameca, State of Mexico	Francisco Flores	3,000
Misioneros de Jalpan	Jalpan de Serra, Querétaro	Unidad Deportiva Jalpan	1,000
Necaxa Rayos	San Juan de los Lagos, Jalisco	Antonio R. Márquez	1,500
Petroleros de Salamanca	Salamanca, Guanajuato	Olímpico Sección 24	10,000
Teca Huixquilucan	Huixquilucan, State of Mexico	Alberto Pérez Navarro	3,000
Titanes de Tulancingo	Tulancingo, Hidalgo	Primero de Mayo	2,500
Toluca	Metepec, State of Mexico	Instalaciones de Metepec	1,000
Unión de Curtidores	León, Guanajuato	La Martinica	11,000

=== Western Zone ===
Location of teams in the 2006–07 Segunda División Western Zone

Club	City	Stadium	Capacity
Atlas	Zapopan, Jalisco	Atlas Colomos	3,000
Cachorros UdeG	Zapopan, Jalisco	Municipal Santa Rosa; Club Deportivo U. de G.	3,500; 3,000
Chivas San Rafael	Guadalajara, Jalisco	Club Chivas San Rafael	800
Delfines de Jalisco	Guadalajara, Jalisco	Olímpico Parque Solidaridad	1,500
Deportivo Autlán	Autlán, Jalisco	Unidad Deportiva Chapultepec	1,500
Dorados Guamúchil	Guamúchil, Sinaloa	Alfredo Díaz Angulo	5,000
Dorados Mazatlán	Mazatlán, Sinaloa	Centro Deportivo Benito Juárez	2,000
Guadalajara	Zapopan, Jalisco	Verde Valle	800
Jaguares de Zamora	Zamora, Michoacán	Unidad Deportiva El Chamizal	5,000
Monarcas Morelia	Morelia, Michoacán	Venustiano Carranza	17,600
Palmeros de Colima	Colima City, Colima	Colima; Olímpico Universitario	12,000; 11,812
Soccer Manzanillo	Manzanillo, Colima	Gustavo Vázquez Montes	4,000
UAG Tecomán	Zapopan, Jalisco	Deportivo UAG	1,000
Vaqueros	Ixtlán del Río, Nayarit	Unidad Deportiva Roberto Gómez Reyes	4,000

=== Northern Zone ===
Location of teams in the 2006–07 Segunda División Northern Zone

Club	City	Stadium	Capacity
Altamira	Altamira, Tamaulipas	Altamira	9,581
Atlético Lagunero	Gómez Palacio, Durango	Unidad Deportiva Francisco Gómez Palacio	4,000
Bravos	Nuevo Laredo, Tamaulipas	Unidad Deportiva Benito Juárez	5,000
Cachorros UANL	General Zuazua, Nuevo León	Instalaciones de Zuazua	800
Deportivo Durango	Durango City, Durango	Francisco Zarco	18,000
Dorados UACH	Chihuahua City, Chihuahua	Olímpico Universitario José Reyes Baeza	22,000
Excélsior	Salinas Victoria, Nuevo León	Centro Deportivo Soriana	2,000
Rayados 2a	Monterrey, Nuevo León	El Cerrito	1,000
Santos Laguna	Gómez Palacio, Durango	Santa Rita	1,000
Tampico Madero	Tampico Madero, Tamaulipas	Tamaulipas	19,667
U.A. Tamaulipas	Ciudad Victoria, Tamaulipas	Professor Eugenio Alvizo Porras	5,000
Unión Piedras Negras	Piedras Negras, Coahuila	Piedras Negras	6,000
Vaqueros de Apodaca/Reynosa	Apodaca, Nuevo León; Reynosa, Tamaulipas	Unidad Deportiva Centro; Adolfo López Mateos	5,000; 10,000

== Torneo Apertura ==
=== Regular season ===
==== Southern Zone ====
Pos	Team	Pld	W	D	L	GF	GA	GD	Pts	Qualification or relegation
1	Pioneros de Cancún	10	5	4	1	23	11	+12	21	Liguilla de Ascenso
2	Tiburones Rojos de Córdoba	10	6	2	2	18	9	+9	21	Liguilla de Ascenso
3	Inter Playa del Carmen	10	5	3	2	18	9	+9	20	Liguilla de Ascenso
4	Itzaes Yucatán	10	6	1	3	12	10	+2	20	Liguilla de Ascenso
5	Guerreros de Tabasco	10	5	2	3	13	7	+6	17	
6	Albinegros de Orizaba	10	1	7	2	17	18	−1	15	
7	Académicos UGM	10	4	1	5	17	16	+1	13	
8	Ocelotes UNACH	10	3	2	5	16	22	−6	11	
9	Limoneros de Río Grande	10	2	3	5	17	29	−12	10	
10	Jaguares de Tabasco	10	2	2	6	15	16	−1	9	
11	Alebrijes de Oaxaca	10	2	1	7	13	32	−19	8	

Source: RSSSF

==== Central Zone ====
Pos	Team	Pld	W	D	L	GF	GA	GD	Pts	Qualification or relegation
1	Pachuca Juniors	15	13	2	0	51	13	+38	41	Liguilla de Ascenso
2	Cuautitlán	15	9	5	1	27	8	+19	36	Liguilla de Ascenso
3	Potros UAEM	15	9	4	2	27	11	+16	34	Liguilla de Ascenso
4	Pumas Prepa	15	10	2	3	29	16	+13	32	Liguilla de Filiales
5	Astros de Cuernavaca	15	8	3	4	25	18	+7	29	
6	Tecamachalco	15	4	6	5	18	19	−1	24	
7	Gallos Blancos de Izcalli	15	6	3	6	20	24	−4	23	
8	América Coapa	15	5	5	5	25	21	+4	22	Liguilla de Filiales
9	Pumas Naucalpan	15	6	3	6	21	23	−2	22	
10	Ballenas Galeana Morelos	15	5	2	8	12	15	−3	18	
11	Lobos Prepa	15	5	2	8	18	24	−6	18	
12	Puebla	15	3	5	7	17	26	−9	17	
13	Garzas UAEH	15	3	5	7	9	19	−10	16	
14	Cuautla	15	2	6	7	14	26	−12	12	
15	Pachuca Tuzos	15	2	4	9	16	40	−24	12	
16	Atlético Tapatío–Chalco	15	0	3	12	10	36	−26	4	

Source: RSSSF

==== Bajío Zone ====
Pos	Team	Pld	W	D	L	GF	GA	GD	Pts	Qualification or relegation
1	Cruz Azul Jasso	15	13	0	2	43	4	+39	39	Liguilla de Ascenso
2	Atlético Cuauhtémoc	15	10	3	2	31	17	+14	35	Liguilla de Ascenso
3	Necaxa Rayos	15	9	2	4	29	15	+14	31	Liguilla de Ascenso
4	Aztecas Celaya	15	9	2	4	23	12	+11	29	
5	Petroleros de Salamanca	15	8	3	4	30	21	+9	28	
6	Teca Huixquilucan	15	7	4	4	33	20	+13	27	
7	Halcones del Valle del Mezquital	15	9	0	6	23	14	+9	27	
8	Toluca	15	8	1	6	24	20	+4	25	Liguilla de Filiales
9	Titanes de Tulancingo	15	7	2	6	19	17	+2	23	
10	Irapuato	15	5	4	6	18	20	−2	22	
11	Halcones de San Juan del Río	15	4	5	6	18	22	−4	20	
12	Cachorros León	15	4	3	8	20	24	−4	16	
13	Misioneros de Jalpan	15	4	0	11	11	44	−33	12	
14	Unión de Curtidores	15	2	3	10	17	33	−16	11	
15	Halcones de Tlaxcala	15	2	3	10	16	35	−19	10	
16	Leones Amecameca	15	1	1	13	9	46	−37	5	

Source: RSSSF

==== Western Zone ====
Pos	Team	Pld	W	D	L	GF	GA	GD	Pts	Qualification or relegation
1	Guadalajara	13	10	1	2	31	15	+16	31	Liguilla de Filiales
2	Palmeros de Colima	13	9	1	3	25	14	+11	28	Liguilla de Ascenso
3	Atlas	13	6	5	2	20	13	+7	28	Liguilla de Ascenso
4	Deportivo Autlán	13	6	6	1	21	11	+10	26	Liguilla de Ascenso
5	Vaqueros	13	7	3	3	24	18	+6	25	
6	Soccer Manzanillo	13	5	3	5	27	19	+8	19	
7	Chivas San Rafael	13	5	2	6	23	25	−2	18	Liguilla de Filiales
8	Cachorros UdeG	13	4	4	5	18	24	−6	17	
9	Jaguares de Zamora	13	3	5	5	18	23	−5	16	
10	Monarcas Morelia	13	4	2	7	17	22	−5	16	
11	UAG Tecomán	13	4	2	7	20	26	−6	16	
12	Dorados Mazatlán	13	4	2	7	23	28	−5	14	
13	Delfines Jalisco	13	2	3	8	17	27	−10	11	
14	Dorados Guamúchil	13	2	1	10	9	28	−19	8	

Source: RSSSF

==== Northern Zone ====
Pos	Team	Pld	W	D	L	GF	GA	GD	Pts	Qualification or relegation
1	Santos Laguna	12	9	2	1	30	13	+17	30	Liguilla de Filiales
2	Rayados 2a	12	7	4	1	23	10	+13	29	Liguilla de Filiales
3	Tampico Madero	12	6	5	1	23	12	+11	25	Liguilla de Ascenso
4	Cachorros UANL	12	7	2	3	21	12	+9	25	Liguilla de Filiales
5	Deportivo Durango	12	6	3	3	25	13	+12	23	Liguilla de Ascenso
6	Excélsior	12	7	1	4	27	17	+10	23	Liguilla de Ascenso
7	Altamira	12	6	2	4	23	15	+8	21	
8	Dorados UACH	12	2	4	6	12	20	−8	12	
9	Bravos de Nuevo Laredo	12	1	6	5	15	25	−10	12	
10	Unión Piedras Negras	12	3	2	7	10	18	−8	11	
11	Atlético Lagunero	12	3	1	8	12	26	−14	10	
12	U.A. Tamaulipas	12	2	3	7	13	30	−17	9	
13	Vaqueros de Apodaca	12	0	3	9	6	29	−23	4	

Source: RSSSF

=== Liguilla de Ascenso ===
Round of 16
1	Pachuca Juniors	0	6	6
13	Itzaes Yucatán	1	1	2
4	Atlético Cuauhtémoc	0	2	2
15	Durango	1	2	3
6	Palmeros de Colima	1	2	3
14	Deportivo Autlán	1	0	1
5	Potros UAEM	0	1
11	Necaxa Rayos	3	1	4
2	Cruz Azul Jasso	4	3	7
16	Excélsior	1	0	1
3	Cuautitlán	0	0	0
12	Inter Playa del Carmen	0	1	1
7	Atlas	0	7	7
10	Tampico Madero	0	0	0
8	Pioneros de Cancún	0	2	2
9	TR Córdoba	0	1	1

Quarter-finals
1	Pachuca Juniors	1	4	5
15	Durango	1	0	1
6	Palmeros de Colima
11	Necaxa Rayos	2	0	2
2	Cruz Azul Jasso	2	5	7
12	Inter Playa del Carmen	1	0	1
7	Atlas	1	1	2
8	Pioneros de Cancún	1	0	1

Semi-finals
1	Pachuca Juniors	1	1	2
11	Necaxa Rayos	1	0	1
2	Cruz Azul Jasso	1	0	1
7	Atlas	1	3	4

Final
1	Pachuca Juniors	0	3	3
7	Atlas	0	0	0

Apertura 2006 winners

1st title

=== Liguilla de Filiales ===
Quarter-finals
4	Pumas Prepa	0	2	2
5	Cachorros UANL	1	2	3
3	Guadalajara	0	1	1
6	Toluca	1	1	2
2	Rayados 2a	1	3	4
7	América Coapa	1	0	1
1	Santos Laguna	0	3	3
8	Chivas San Rafael	2	3	5

Semi-finals
5	Cachorros UANL	1	2	3
6	Toluca	3	3	6
2	Rayados 2a	0	2	2
8	Chivas San Rafael	0	3	3

Final
6	Toluca	1	0	1
8	Chivas San Rafael	3	3	6

Apertura 2006 Filiales winners

1st title

== Torneo Clausura ==
=== Regular season ===
==== Southern Zone ====
Pos	Team	Pld	W	D	L	GF	GA	GD	Pts	Qualification or relegation
1	Tiburones Rojos de Córdoba	10	6	2	2	24	8	+16	22	Liguilla de Ascenso
2	Pioneros de Cancún	10	5	4	1	20	11	+9	19	Liguilla de Ascenso
3	Jaguares de Tabasco	10	4	4	2	12	7	+5	19	Liguilla de Ascenso
4	Guerreros de Tabasco	10	5	3	2	18	9	+9	18	
5	Inter Playa del Carmen	10	4	3	3	15	11	+4	17	
6	Itzaes Yucatán	10	4	3	3	10	14	−4	16	
7	Albinegros de Orizaba	10	3	4	3	11	11	0	15	
8	Ocelotes UNACH	10	4	2	4	12	18	−6	14	
9	Académicos UGM	10	1	5	4	10	15	−5	11	
10	Limoneros de Río Grande	10	1	4	5	13	20	−7	10	
11	Alebrijes de Oaxaca	10	0	2	8	4	25	−21	4	

Source: RSSSF

==== Central Zone ====
Pos	Team	Pld	W	D	L	GF	GA	GD	Pts	Qualification or relegation
1	América Coapa	15	10	2	3	31	16	+15	34	Liguilla de Filiales
2	Cuautitlán	15	8	5	2	35	19	+16	32	Liguilla de Ascenso
3	Pachuca Juniors	15	9	3	3	38	18	+20	31	Liguilla de Ascenso
4	Puebla	15	8	4	3	32	25	+7	30	Liguilla de Filiales
5	Pumas Prepa	15	7	4	4	31	17	+14	29	Liguilla de Filiales
6	Pumas Naucalpan	15	8	3	4	28	16	+12	28	Liguilla de Ascenso
7	Tecamachalco	15	8	4	3	26	15	+11	28	
8	Ballenas Galeana Morelos	15	6	4	5	16	18	−2	24	
9	Cuautla	15	6	2	7	22	22	0	21	
10	Astros de Cuernavaca	15	5	2	8	27	27	0	18	
11	Atlético Tapatío–Chalco	15	3	5	7	15	23	−8	18	
12	Potros UAEM	15	3	6	6	16	18	−2	17	
13	Gallos Blancos de Izcalli	15	4	3	8	16	24	−8	16	
14	Lobos Prepa	15	3	4	8	28	33	−5	15	
15	Garzas UAEH	15	3	3	9	18	26	−8	13	
16	Pachuca Tuzos	15	2	0	13	6	68	−62	6	

Source: RSSSF

==== Bajío Zone ====
Pos	Team	Pld	W	D	L	GF	GA	GD	Pts	Qualification or relegation
1	Necaxa Rayos	15	11	1	3	27	11	+16	35	Liguilla de Ascenso
2	Cruz Azul Jasso	15	10	3	2	36	11	+25	34	Liguilla de Ascenso
3	Irapuato	15	10	3	2	27	9	+18	34	Liguilla de Ascenso
4	Aztecas Celaya	15	10	1	4	22	13	+9	31	Liguilla de Ascenso
5	Halcones de Tlaxcala	15	9	1	5	25	24	+1	29	
6	Atlético Cuauhtémoc	15	6	6	3	30	23	+7	28	
7	Petroleros de Salamanca	15	7	4	4	30	18	+12	27	
8	Toluca	15	7	3	5	17	14	+3	25	Liguilla de Filiales
9	Halcones de San Juan del Río	15	4	5	6	18	27	−9	21	
10	Teca Huixquilucan	15	3	5	7	21	28	−7	17	
11	Cachorros León	15	5	1	9	19	25	−6	16	
12	Misioneros de Jalpan	15	3	3	9	19	24	−5	15	
13	Halcones del Valle del Mezquital	15	3	5	7	15	25	−10	15	
14	Titanes de Tulancingo	15	2	6	7	11	23	−12	14	
15	Unión de Curtidores	15	2	3	10	12	30	−18	10	
16	Leones Amecameca	15	1	4	10	11	35	−24	9	

Source: RSSSF

==== Western Zone ====
Pos	Team	Pld	W	D	L	GF	GA	GD	Pts	Qualification or relegation
1	Deportivo Autlán	13	8	4	1	21	11	+10	30	Liguilla de Ascenso
2	Monarcas Morelia	13	8	4	1	30	12	+18	29	Liguilla de Filiales
3	Soccer Manzanillo	13	7	2	4	25	20	+5	25	Liguilla de Ascenso
4	Palmeros de Colima	13	6	4	3	18	15	+3	25	Liguilla de Ascenso
5	Jaguares de Zamora	13	6	3	4	19	14	+5	23	
6	Vaqueros	13	7	0	6	25	21	+4	21	
7	Guadalajara	13	4	5	4	22	20	+2	20	Liguilla de Filiales
8	Dorados Guamúchil	13	5	2	6	16	23	−7	18	
9	Atlas	13	5	1	7	13	20	−7	17	
10	Chivas San Rafael	13	4	2	7	18	23	−5	15	
11	Delfines Jalisco	13	3	6	4	10	16	−6	15	
12	Cachorros UdeG	13	3	3	7	14	23	−9	14	
13	UAG Tecomán	13	4	1	8	18	20	−2	13	
14	Dorados Mazatlán	13	2	1	10	11	22	−11	8	

Source: RSSSF

==== Northern Zone ====
Pos	Team	Pld	W	D	L	GF	GA	GD	Pts	Qualification or relegation
1	Altamira	12	9	2	1	31	9	+22	30	Liguilla de Ascenso
2	Santos Laguna	12	6	4	2	27	20	+7	25	Liguilla de Filiales
3	Tampico Madero	12	5	4	3	12	14	−2	23	Liguilla de Ascenso
4	U.A. Tamaulipas	12	6	3	3	19	19	0	21	Liguilla de Ascenso
5	Excélsior	12	4	5	3	21	21	0	20	
6	Rayados 2a	12	6	1	5	16	17	−1	20	Liguilla de Filiales
7	Unión Piedras Negras	12	3	5	4	11	11	0	17	
8	Cachorros UANL	12	3	4	5	11	11	0	17	
9	Deportivo Durango	12	4	3	5	15	17	−2	16	
10	Atlético Lagunero	12	4	3	5	25	20	+5	15	
11	Bravos de Nuevo Laredo	12	2	6	4	12	20	−8	14	
12	Dorados UACH	12	2	5	5	10	12	−2	12	
13	Vaqueros de Reynosa	12	0	3	9	6	25	−19	4	Relegated to Tercera División

Source: RSSSF

=== Liguilla de Ascenso ===
Round of 16
1	Necaxa Rayos	0	1	1
9	Pumas Naucalpan	0	0	0
4	Cuautitlán	1	3	4
15	Pioneros de Cancún	3	0	3
5	Pachuca Juniors	3	1	4
6	Aztecas Celaya	0	2	2
7	Altamira	2	0	2
14	U.A. Tamaulipas	0	1	1
2	Cruz Azul Jasso	2	3	5
11	Palmeros de Colima	0	3	3
3	Irapuato	0	2	2
10	Soccer Manzanillo	0	1	1
8	Deportivo Autlán	4	1	5
12	Tampico Madero	0	2	2
13	TR Córdoba	2	3	5
16	Jaguares de Tabasco	3	1	4

Quarter-finals
1	Necaxa Rayos	2	1	3
4	Cuautitlán	1	0	1
5	Pachuca Juniors	5	2	7
7	Altamira	0	3	3
2	Cruz Azul Jasso	0	2	2
3	Irapuato	0	0	0
8	Deportivo Autlán	0	4	4
13	TR Córdoba	0	1	1

Semi-finals
1	Necaxa Rayos	1	1	2
5	Pachuca Juniors	0	1	1
2	Cruz Azul Jasso	0	1	1
8	Deportivo Autlán	0	0	0

Final
1	Necaxa Rayos	3	2	5
2	Cruz Azul Jasso	2	2	4

Clausura 2007 winners

1st title

=== Liguilla de Filiales ===
Quarter-finals
1	América Coapa	2	4	6
8	Guadalajara	1	2	3
3	Monarcas Morelia	1	3	4
7	Rayados 2a	3	3	6
2	Puebla	1	0	1
4	Pumas Prepa	3	1	4
5	Santos Laguna	1	1	2
6	Toluca	1	2	3

Semi-finals
1	América Coapa	2	2	4
7	Rayados 2a	2	1	3
4	Pumas Prepa	4	0	4
6	Toluca	1	1	2

Final
1	América Coapa	3	1	4
4	Pumas Prepa	0	1	1

Clausura 2007 Filiales winners

1st title

== Promotion Final ==
The Promotion Final is a series of matches played by the champions of the tournaments Apertura and Clausura, the game is played to determine the winning team of the promotion to Liga de Ascenso. The first leg was played on 24 May 2007, and the second leg was played on 27 May 2007.

Team 1	Agg.	Team 2	1st leg	2nd leg
Pachuca Juniors	5–2	Cruz Azul Jasso	1–1	4–1

2006–07 winners

1st title

== See also ==
- Primera División de México Apertura 2006
- Primera División de México Clausura 2007
- 2006–07 Primera División A season
