= Éder Cruz =

Mexican footballer (born 1989)

Personal information
- Full name: Eder Omar Cruz Jiménez
- Date of birth: 20 January 1989 (age 37)
- Place of birth: Tuxpan, Veracruz, Mexico
- Height: 1.72 m (5 ft 7 1/2 in)
- Position: Forward

Youth career
- 2007: Pachuca Juniors

Senior career*
Years	Team	Apps	(Gls)
2007–2010	Universidad del Fútbol	81	(53)
2009	Pachuca	1	(0)
2010	Tampico Madero	10	(8)
2011–2012	León	19	(3)
2012–2013	Murciélagos	18	(11)
2013	Linces de Tlaxcala	2	(2)
2014	Altamira	12	(3)
2014–2015	Tlaxcala	25	(9)
2016–2017	Loros UdeC	31	(10)
2017–2019	Mineros de Zacatecas	57	(14)
2019–2020	Tampico Madero	15	(4)
2020	Cancún	14	(3)
2021	Correcaminos	14	(0)
- * Club domestic league appearances and goals as of 11 February 2021 (UTC)

Eder Omar Cruz Jiménez (Note: In this Spanish name, the first or paternal surname is Cruz and the second or maternal family name is Jiménez.) (born w0 January 1989) is a Mexican professional footballer who last played for Correcaminos.
