= Alfredo Sánchez (footballer, born 1987) =

Mexican footballer

Personal information
- Full name: Alfredo Sánchez Cruz
- Date of birth: 23 March 1987 (age 39)
- Place of birth: Apatzingán, Michoacán, Mexico
- Height: 1.74 m (5 ft 8 1/2 in)
- Position: Midfielder

Youth career
- 2006–2009: Académicos
- 2007–2008: Atlético Cihuatlán

Senior career*
Years	Team	Apps	(Gls)
2006–2013	F.C. Atlas	16	(0)
- * Club domestic league appearances and goals as of 6 July 2012

Alfredo Sánchez Cruz (born March 23, 1987) is a Mexican former midfielder. He last played for F.C. Atlas, in the Liga MX.

Alfredo made his debut on April 1, 2006, in a 3–1 loss to Dorados de Sinaloa, without having played for Atlas' filial team, Académicos. He was later sent down to the Primera A for more playing time. He then played in the Segunda Division (Second Division) for Atlético Cihuatlán. Eventually, he made his way back to Atlas, where his best season was the Apertura 2008 season. He played in 12 games, was a starter in half of them, logged 691 minutes of playing time, but scored no goals. However, he did earn an assist in a 4–2 loss to Cruz Azul.
