= Jorge Urbina (footballer) =

Mexican footballer and manager (born 1977)

Personal information
- Full name: Jorge Alberto Urbina Sánchez
- Date of birth: 1 December 1977 (age 48)
- Place of birth: Ciudad Victoria, Tamaulipas, Mexico
- Height: 1.78 m (5 ft 10 in)
- Position: Midfielder

Team information
- Current team: Correcaminos UAT Premier (manager)

Senior career*
Years	Team	Apps	(Gls)
2001–2002	Reboceros de La Piedad	7	(0)
2004	Correcaminos UAT	7	(0)

Managerial career
- 2010–2015: Correcaminos UAT Reserves and Academy
- 2015: Correcaminos UAT (Interim)
- 2015: Correcaminos UAT (Assistant)
- 2015–2017: Correcaminos UAT Premier
- 2018: Tuxtla
- 2019: Gavilanes de Matamoros
- 2021: Correcaminos UAT (Assistant)
- 2021: Correcaminos UAT (Interim)
- 2022: Correcaminos UAT
- 2024–2025: Correcaminos UAT TDP
- 2025: Correcaminos UAT (Interim)
- 2026–: Correcaminos UAT Premier
- * Club domestic league appearances and goals

Jorge Alberto Urbina Sánchez (born December 1, 1977) is a Mexican football manager and former player.
