= Búhos UNISON =

Búhos UNISON F.C.
- Full name: Búhos de Hermosillo Fútbol Club
- Nicknames: Búhos, Las aves nocturnas
- Founded: 2004; 22 years ago
- Dissolved: June 2025; 1 year ago
- Ground: Estadio Miguel Castro Servín; Hermosillo, Sonora
- Capacity: 4,000
- Owner: University of Sonora
- Chairman: Rogelio Cota
- Manager: Manuel Guerra Robles
- League: Liga TDP
- 2021–22: Withdrew
Home colours	Away colours

Búhos UNISON F.C., previously Búhos de Hermosillo Fútbol Club, was a Mexican football club based in Hermosillo, Sonora which competed in the Tercera División de México, the bottom level division of Mexican football. They played their home team matches at the Estadio Miguel Castro Servín.

== History ==
In 2004, a group of investors (Prospero Barboza Ochoa, Martín Trujillo Camacho, Alfonso & Álvaro Santacruz Pujol, Gilberto Cota Munguía and Alberto Arellano Chávez) legally created Club de Fútbol Búhos de Hermosillo, AC, with the club starting in the Tercera División de México that same year. The club earned promotion to the Segunda División de México in 2007, where they remained until 2011, when Ballenas Galeana Morelos purchased their spot in the league and the Búhos franchise was relocated to Xochitepec, Morelos and was dissolved shortly after.

In 2021, the University of Sonora recovered the football team after a 10-year absence. The squad was registered in the Tercera División de México, the league which is located at the bottom level division of the Mexican professional football system.

In June 2025, Búhos UNISON was absorbed by Soles de Sonora, so that club took Búhos UNISON's place in the Tercera División.

== Uniform ==
Previous Kit
Previous Kit

== Stadium ==
When the team started they played at the Estadio Miguel Castro Servín located in the campus of the Universidad de Sonora in Hermosillo, Sonora. After Coyotes de Sonora, a team which played in the Primera División 'A' de México was dissolved in 2006, the team took over at Estadio Héroe de Nacozari. In 2021, the team returned to Estadio Miguel Castro Servín.

== Players ==
=== Current squad ===
Note: Flags indicate national team as defined under FIFA eligibility rules; some limited exceptions apply. Players may hold more than one non-FIFA nationality.

No.	Pos.	Nation	Player
1	GK	MEX	José Vega
2	DF	MEX	Axl Solano
3	DF	MEX	Manuel Lugo
4	DF	MEX	Francisco Olivas
5	DF	MEX	Luis Medina
6	MF	MEX	James García
7	MF	MEX	Diego León
8	MF	MEX	Brayan Serna
9	FW	MEX	José Meléndez
10	MF	MEX	Erick Peralta
11	FW	MEX	Jorge Miranda
12	MF	MEX	David Rosas
13	MF	MEX	Miguel Corona
14	DF	MEX	Oscar Gracia
15	MF	MEX	Héctor Uriarte
16	MF	MEX	Juan Ruíz
17	FW	MEX	Agustín Gámez

No.	Pos.	Nation	Player
18	DF	MEX	Victor Rangel
19	MF	MEX	Diego Aguiar
20	MF	MEX	Alexis García
21	DF	MEX	Juan Núñez
22	DF	MEX	José Bejarano
23	GK	MEX	Ramón Rodríguez
24	DF	MEX	Livani Álvarez
25	MF	MEX	Tomás Encinas
26	MF	MEX	Alejandro Herrera
27	FW	MEX	Pablo Miranda
28	DF	MEX	Adrián Lira
29	MF	MEX	Jesús Cota
30	GK	MEX	Manuel Gracia
31	DF	MEX	Jesús Fernández
32	MF	MEX	Luis Gámez
33	DF	MEX	Aarón Flores
34	MF	MEX	Carlos Verdejo

== Coaching staff ==
- Manager:

(Mexico) Manuel Ignacio Guerra Robles

- Assistant Manager:

(Mexico) José Torrecillas

- Medic:

(Mexico) Carlos Aceves

=== Past Managers ===
- Enrique Ferreira Ramírez (Clausura 2004 - Clausura 2006)
- Julio César Duarte Siqueiros (Clausura 2006 - Apertura 2007)
- Víctor Manuel Márquez Ulloa (Apertura 2007 - Clasura 2008)

== Honours ==
=== National ===
- Campeón de Ascenso de la Tercera División de México: 1

Apertura 2006

- Campeón Promocional de la Tercera División de México: 2

Apertura 2004, Clausura 2005

- Subcampeón de Promocional de la Tercera División de México: 1

Torneo de Clausura 2004
