= Cruz Azul Jasso =

Defunct reserve football team of Cruz Azul based in Hidalgo, Mexico

- Full name: Club Deportivo Cruz Azul Jasso
- Nicknames: La Máquina (The Machine); Los Celestes (The Sky-Blues); Los Cementeros (The Cement Makers); Las Liebres (The Hares)
- Short name: CAZ
- Founded: 2006; 20 years ago
- Dissolved: 2015; 11 years ago
- Ground: Estadio 10 de Diciembre
- Capacity: 7,761
- Owner: Cooperativa La Cruz Azul
- Website: cfcruzazul.com
Home colours	Away colours	Third colours

Club Deportivo Cruz Azul Jasso, also known as Cruz Azul Jasso, was a professional football club in Mexico that last played in the Segunda División and Tercera División de México. The team played its home matches at the Estadio 10 de Diciembre, located in Ciudad Cooperativa Cruz Azul, Hidalgo, and served as a reserve team for Cruz Azul.

== History ==
The team began participating in the Apertura 2006 tournament in the Segunda División Zona Bajío under the name Cruz Azul Hidalgo. Following the relocation of the now-defunct Cruz Azul Oaxaca franchise to Hidalgo, the team adopted the name Cruz Azul Jasso, while the incoming team took the Cruz Azul Hidalgo identity. Cruz Azul Jasso won the Segunda División title during the Clausura 2007 tournament.

In Apertura 2014, the club reverted to the Cruz Azul Hidalgo name after the Ascenso MX franchise was moved to Zacatepec, Morelos and sold to Zacatepec. Subsequently, Tercera División side, Cruz Azul Dublán, was renamed Cruz Azul Jasso. The new Cruz Azul Jasso competed in the Tercera División during the 2014–15 season, after which the franchise was transformed into Cruz Azul Premier, returning to the Segunda División once again.

== Stadium ==
The Estadio 10 de Diciembre was originally built to host the main Cruz Azul squad before the club relocated to Mexico City. With a capacity of 17,000 seated spectators, the stadium includes shaded areas.

== Honours ==
- Segunda División
  - Champions (1): Clausura 2007
- Copa de la Liga Premier de Ascenso
  - Champions (1): Apertura 2013
- Campeón de Campeones de la Liga Premier de Ascenso
  - Champions (1): Clausura 2014
