= Emmanuel Gil =

Mexican footballer (born 1986)

Personal information
- Full name: Emmanuel Gil Tapia
- Date of birth: 16 August 1986 (age 40)
- Place of birth: Cajeme, Sonora, Mexico
- Height: 1.70 m (5 ft 7 in)
- Position: Midfielder

Senior career*
Years	Team	Apps	(Gls)
2007–2011	Orizaba	57	(0)
2011–2013	La Piedad	56	(3)
2013–	Veracruz	29	(0)
2015	→ Puebla (loan)	4	(0)
2016	Cafetaleros	8	(0)
- * Club domestic league appearances and goals as of 5 August 2018

Emmanuel Gil Tapia (born 16 August 1986) is a Mexican footballer who played as a right midfielder.

== Club career ==
Gil started his professional career with Albinegros de Orizaba.

He played for Reboceros de La Piedad from 2011 to 2013. On 2013 Reboceros were promoted to Liga MX.
