= Tecamachalco F.C. =

Tecamachalco
- Full name: Tecamachalco Fútbol Club
- Founded: 2000; 26 years ago
- Dissolved: 2018; 8 years ago
- Ground: Estadio Alberto Pérez Navarro; Huixquilucan, State of Mexico
- Capacity: 3,000
Home colours	Away colours	Third colours

Tecamachalco Fútbol Club, simplified as Tecamachalco FC, was a Mexican professional football club based in Huixquilucan, State of Mexico. It competed in Segunda División, the third level division of Mexican football, and played its home matches at the Estadio Alberto Pérez Navarro.

== Honours ==
=== National ===
==== Promotion divisions ====
- Segunda División
  - Runners-up (3): Clausura 2003, Apertura 2011, Clausura 2012
- Tercera División
  - Champions (1): Clausura 2006

== Reserves ==
=== Tecamachalco "B" ===
Finished as runners-up in the Verano 2002 tournament of the Tercera División.

=== Teca Huixquilucan ===
Finished as runners-up in the Apertura 2007 tournament of the Tercera División.

=== Tecamachalco Sur ===
Finished as runners-up in the 2012–13 season of the Tercera División.
