= Real Cuautitlán =

- Full name: Club de Fútbol Real Cuautitlán
- Nicknames: Los Truenos (The Thunders); Los Cocoleros (The Cocoleros)
- Founded: 1996; 30 years ago
- Dissolved: 2017; 9 years ago
- Ground: Estadio Municipal Claudio Suárez; Texcoco, State of Mexico
- Capacity: 4,000
Home colours	Away colours

Club de Fútbol Real Cuautitlán was a Mexican football club that played in the Segunda División de México. The club was based in Cuautitlán, State of Mexico.

== History ==
The club was founded in 1996 joining the Tercera División de México, and in that same year the club managed to win the tournament and earned the promotion to the Segunda División de México and would join forces with Necaxa.

In 1999, the club won the Invierno 1999 Championship defeating Tapatío in the final. The club went on to play the promotion match against Club Deportivo Marte who had won the Verano 2000, which they lost.

The club played in the Segunda División de México under the name Cocoleros de Cuautitlán.

== Past crests ==
1996
2nd Past Crest

== See also ==
- Football in Mexico

== Players ==
=== Most Recent Players ===
- Luis Ernesto Pérez
- Mario Pérez
- Diego Alfonso Martínez
- José Ramírez
- Alfredo "Chango" Moreno
- Carlos Flores
- Armando "Loco" Ávila Dorador
- Gabriel Roussique
- José Trinidad Saenz
- Carlos Vázquez
- Christian Martínez
- Ángel Raúl "Rambo" Sosa Hernández
- Geovanni Torres
- José Eduardo "Toro" Ávila
- Gabriel Casas
- Pablo Ornelas
- Brandon Buitron
- Alexandro "Monstruo" Álvarez
- Alfonso Blanco
- Antonio Moreno
- Francisco Pastor Montero

== Honors ==
- Tercera División de México (2): 1995-96 y 2012-13
- Segunda División de México (1):Invierno 1999
- Segunda División de México Promotion (2)
- Primera División 'A' de México Promotion (1)
- Runner Up (1): Apertura 2003
