= Deportivo Cihuatlán F.C. =

Mexican football club

- Full name: Deportivo Cihuatlán Fútbol Club
- Founded: 1998; 28 years ago
- Ground: Estadio El Llanito; Cihuatlán, Jalisco, Mexico
- Capacity: 5,000
- Manager: César Salas
- League: Liga TDP - Group 13
Home colours	Away colours

Deportivo Cihuatlán F.C. is a Mexican football club that plays in the Tercera División de México, the bottom division level of Mexican football. The club is based in Cihuatlán, Jalisco and plays its home team match games at the Estadio El Llanito.

== History ==
=== Deportivo Cihuatlán I ===
In 1998, the first representative team of the city of Cihuatlán, Jalisco was founded, which was called Deportivo Cihuatlán and competed in the Tercera División de México. In 1999, it won the league championship and its promotion to the Segunda División de México after defeat Potros UAEM in the final. In the Torneo Invierno 2001 of the Segunda División, the team achieved its second championship by defeating Tapatío in the final, in this way the club achieved its promotion to the Primera División 'A' de México.

In Invierno 2002, the team debuted in the Primera División 'A' de México getting 26 points in 19 games, which allowed him to play the repechage stage, however, in this series the club was eliminated by Acapulco. For the Verano 2003, Cihuatlán finished in second place in the regular stage, thus qualifying for the first play-offs in its history. In the quarterfinals, the club eliminated Celaya by an aggregate score of 8–4, however, in the semifinals the team was defeated by Tapatío with an aggregate of 6–10, signing the best season in history. At the end of the tournament, the team was sold by its owners because Cihuatlán did not meet the conditions to keep a team in that division, so the franchise was relocated to Culiacán, Sinaloa and was renamed Dorados de Sinaloa.

=== Atlético Cihuatlán ===
In 2004, Jimmy Goldsmith founded a new team called Atlético Cihuatlán which was enrolled in the Tercera División de México. In the Clausura 2007, the team won the championship and thus their promotion to the Segunda División de México. In the Clausura 2008 the team was runner-up in the tournament when they were defeated by the Universidad del Fútbol. In May 2008, the team was relocated to the city of Colima, Colima and merged with Loros UdeC, so the University of Colima took the place in the Segunda División as well as some players and coaching staff belonging to Cihuatlán.

=== Deportivo Cihuatlán II ===
In 2021, a new team called Deportivo Cihuatlán F.C. was founded, which was registered in the Tercera División de México to participate from the 2021–2022 season.

== Stadium ==
The Estadio El Llanito is a football stadium located in Cihuatlán, Jalisco, it was inaugurated in 1998 and has a capacity for 5,000 spectators.

== Honours ==
- Segunda División de México: 1

Winners: Invierno 2001
Runner-up (1): Clausura 2008

- Tercera División de México: 2

Winners: 1998–1999, Clausura 2007
