= Atlético Lagunero =

Mexican football club

- Full name: Club Atlético Lagunero S.A de C.V
- Nickname(s): Los Lecheros (The Dairy farmers)
- Founded: 1997
- Dissolved: 2017
- Ground: Unidad Deportiva de Lerdo; Ciudad Lerdo, Durango
- Capacity: 3,700
Home colours	Away colours

Atlético Lagunero was a Mexican football club that played in the Liga Premier - Serie B. The club was based in Ciudad Lerdo, Durango.

== See also ==
- Football in Mexico
