= Correcaminos UAT Premier =

Mexican football club

- Full name: Club de Fútbol Correcaminos de la Universidad Autónoma de Tamaulipas Premier
- Nicknames: Los Correcaminos (The Roadrunners); El Corre (The Corre); Los Naranjas (The Oranges)
- Founded: 1995; 31 years ago
- Ground: Estadio Marte R. Gómez; Estadio Eugenio Alvizo Porras; Ciudad Victoria, Tamaulipas, Mexico
- Capacity: 10,520; 5,000
- Owner: UAT
- Chairman: Armando Arce Serna
- Manager: Jorge Urbina
- League: Liga Premier (Premier A)
- 2025–26: Liga Premier (Serie A); Regular phase: 8th (Group II); Final phase: Did not qualify
- Website: http://www.cfcorrecaminos.com
Home colours	Away colours	Third colours

Club de Fútbol Correcaminos de la Universidad Autónoma de Tamaulipas Premier is a professional football team that plays in the Mexican Football League. They are playing in the Premier A, the intermediate branch of the Liga Premier de México, the third tier of Mexican football. Club de Fútbol Correcaminos de la Universidad Autónoma de Tamaulipas Premier is affiliated with UAT that plays in the Liga de Expansión MX. The games are held in the city of Ciudad Victoria in the Estadio Marte R. Gómez and Estadio Eugenio Alvizo Porras as a backup stadium.

== Players ==
=== Current squad ===
As of September 6 2026

Note: Flags indicate national team as defined under FIFA eligibility rules; some limited exceptions apply. Players may hold more than one non-FIFA nationality.

No.	Pos.	Nation	Player
81	MF	MEX	Alberto Mata
82	GK	MEX	Ian García
83	MF	MEX	Danilo Rincón (on loan from Pachuca)
84	DF	MEX	Luis Rafael García
85	DF	MEX	Santos Támez
86	MF	MEX	Gianni Rubli
87	MF	MEX	Hebert Bocanegra
88	FW	MEX	Diego Barrón
89	FW	MEX	Matías Díaz
90	MF	MEX	Ángel de la Torre
91	DF	MEX	Edgar Alvarado
92	DF	MEX	Aldo García
93	DF	MEX	Alfonso Ávalos
94	MF	MEX	Emilio López

No.	Pos.	Nation	Player
95	MF	MEX	Hugo Maldonado
96	DF	MEX	Walter Acuña
97	mf	MEX	Abraham de León
98	DF	MEX	Alberto Hernández
99	MF	MEX	Manuel Peralta
100	DF	MEX	Servando Aguilar
101	MF	MEX	Alan Aguilar
102	FW	ARG	Luis Campero
103	MF	MEX	Manuel Garza
104	FW	MEX	David Paz
105	GK	MEX	Luis Milán
106	DF	MEX	Alberto Chávez
107	DF	MEX	Ángel Torres
