= F.C. Itzaes =

Itzaes F.C
- Full name: Itzaes de Yucatan F.C
- Nickname(s): Itzaes
- Founded: 1981 AS (Mayas)
- Ground: Estadio 20 de Noviembre, Progreso, Yucatán, México
- Capacity: 3,000
- Chairman: Hervert Garma Magaña
- Manager: Gerardo Torres
- League: Liga TDP
Home colours	Away colours

Itzaes de Yucatan F.C is a Mexican football club that plays in the Tercera División de México. The club is based in Yucatan, Mexico.

== History ==
The club was founded in 1981 as Mayas due to the city's Maya heritage, playing in the Tercera División de México. The club would reach its First Final in 1989 against Furia Azul del Ayense. The final was played in Estadio Carlos Iturralde, where the club went on to lose the game.

The club would not reach another final until 2007 when this time they were defeated by Atlético Cihuatlan.

The club played in the Tercera División de México between 1981 and 2016 when the team was integrated into the structure of Venados F.C.

In 2025 the team was re-established after an alliance with the Progreso F.C. club of the Liga TDP.

== See also ==
- Football in Mexico

== Honors ==
- Tercera División de México
  - Runners-up (2): 1981, 2007
