= Estadio Alberto Pérez Navarro =

Coordinates: 19°21′56″N 99°21′2″W

The Alberto Pérez Navarro is a multi-use stadium in Huixquilucan, State of Mexico, Mexico. It is currently used mostly for football matches and is the home stadium for Cordobés F.C. The stadium has a capacity of 3,000 people.

The stadium hosted expansion team Loyalty Soccer Club in their debut season in 2022.
