= C.D. Tiburones Rojos de Córdoba =

Mexican soccer club

Tiburones Rojos de Córdoba
- Full name: Club Deportivo Tiburones Rojos de Córdoba
- Founded: 2006
- Ground: Rafael Murillo Vidal Cordoba, Veracruz
- Chairman: Manuel Acevedo Quiroz
- Manager: José Marroquín
- League: Segunda División Profesional
| Home colours | Away colours |

Tiburones Rojos de Córdoba is a Mexican football club that plays in the Segunda División Profesional. The club is based in Cordoba, Veracruz.The club was born when Club Veracruz bought the Azucareros de Córdoba franchise in 2006.

== See also ==
- Football in Mexico
