= C.F. Pachuca Reserves and Academy =

Mexican football reserve and academy teams

Pachuca Reserves and Academy
- Full name: Club de Fútbol Pachuca Reserves and Academy
- Nickname: Tuzos (Gophers)
- Ground: Instalaciones de la Universidad del Fútbol, San Agustín Tlaxiaca, Hidalgo
- Capacity: 1,000
- Owner: Grupo Pachuca
- Chairman: Armando Martínez Patiño
- Manager: Luis Almada (U-20); Andrés Chitiva (U-18); Jan Westerhof (U-16); Rodrigo Samaniego (U-14)
Home colours	Away colours

Club de Fútbol Pachuca Reserves and Academy are the reserve teams (also known as Filiales) and the academy teams (also known as Fuerzas Básicas) of CF Pachuca. The club's reserve teams compete in Liga Premier and Liga TDP. The academy teams compete in the Liga MX youth tournaments, which currently consist of the under-23, under-19, under-17 and under-15 categories.

== History ==
Pachuca Juniors played in the Segunda División, winning 3 titles and also participated in the Primera División A in 2004–05 season. After that season the club license was sold and moved to Juárez, later named as Indios de Ciudad Juárez. A new team was restarted for the 2005–06 Segunda División season.

In 2007–08 season, the place of promotion to Primera División A was sold to Chiapas and re-formed as the Jaguares de Tapachula. A new team was affiliated to Segunda División again.

In 2008–09 season, the place of promotion was given to Irapuato and Pachuca Juniors B of Tercera División apparently became the new Pachuca Juniors.

== Reserves teams ==
=== Pachuca Juniors ===
- Segunda División
  - Champions (3): Clausura 2004, Apertura 2006, Apertura 2007
- Campeón de Campeones de la Segunda División
  - Champions (3): 2004, 2007, 2008

=== Universidad del Fútbol ===
- Segunda División
  - Champions (4): Clausura 2008, Clausura 2009, Apertura 2009, Bicentenario 2010
- Campeón de Campeones de la Segunda División
  - Champions (1): 2010
  - Runners-up (2): 2008, 2009

=== Tuzos Pachuca ===
- Tercera División
  - Champions (1): 2013–14

=== Pachuca Premier ===
- Torneo de Filiales de la Liga Premier
  - Champions (2): Apertura 2022, Clausura 2023

=== Pachuca TDP ===
- Torneo de Filiales de la Liga TDP
  - Champions (1): 2022–23

== Academy teams ==
- Liga MX Sub-23
  - Champions (1): Clausura 2024
- Liga MX Sub-20
  - Champions (2): Clausura 2014, Clausura 2015
  - Runners-up (2): Apertura 2014, Guardianes 2021
- Liga MX Sub-19
  - Champions (1): Apertura 2024
- Liga MX Sub-18
  - Champions (1): Apertura 2021
  - Runners-up (1): Apertura 2022
- Liga MX Sub-17
  - Champions (3): Apertura 2012, Clausura 2013, Clausura 2016
  - Runners-up (5): Apertura 2013, Clausura 2015, Apertura 2015, Clausura 2018, Apertura 2019
- Liga MX Sub-17 Internacional
  - Runners-up (1): 2024
- Liga MX Sub-16
  - Runners-up (1): Apertura 2021
- Liga MX Sub-15
  - Champions (5): 2010, Invierno 2012, Verano 2012, Clausura 2016, Apertura 2017
  - Runners-up (6): Invierno 2011, Invierno 2013, Verano 2014, Invierno 2015, Clausura 2017, Apertura 2018
- Liga MX Sub-15 Internacional
  - Champions (4): 2014, 2017, 2018, 2019
- Liga MX Sub-14
  - Champions (1): Clausura 2022
- Liga MX Sub-13
  - Champions (2): 2013, Verano 2018
  - Runners-up (3): Invierno 2016, Primavera 2019, Verano 2019
