= Ballenas Galeana Morelos =

Ballenas Galeana
- Full name: Club de Fútbol Ballenas Galeana Morelos
- Nicknames: Las Ballenas (The Whales); La Marea Azul (The Blue Tide)
- Founded: 1 January 1956; 70 years ago
- Dissolved: 30 May 2014; 11 years ago
- Ground: Estadio Mariano Matamoros; Xochitepec, Morelos
- Capacity: 16,000
- League: Tercera División de México
Home colours	Away colours	Third colours

Club de Fútbol Ballenas Galeana Morelos was a Mexican football club that played in the Tercera División de México. The club was based in Xochitepec, Morelos.

== History ==
The club was founded in 1956 by Donato Rodríguez who constructed a small field near the street Hermenegildo Galeana in downtown Cuernavaca, Morelos because the majority of the players lived in that area. That club played in that ground from 1956 to 1968.

From 1968 to 2005, the club was under the ownership of Antonio Nava Hernández, the club has participated in various divisions never reaching the Primera División de México.

In 2005, Gregorio Yáñez Pineda, who was a former player in the 1960s, was appointed as a caretaker and developed various players that were able to join other top division clubs. In 2011, the club began be playing in the Segunda División de México. In the 2012-13 season, the team won promotion to the Liga de Ascenso de México, the second division level of Mexican football.

== Disappearance ==
On May 30, 2014, Enrique Bonilla, CEO of the Ascenso MX, announced the arrival of Irapuato, instead of Ballenas Galeana, which had to be relocated to Irapuato, Guanajuato due to several economic problems, the same character that was resolved by entrepreneurs from Guanajuato who in turn asked the team to move to this state. Thus, the sell was completed after nearly 50 years of history of Club Ballenas Galeana Morelos. The club was relocated to Irapuato, Guanajuato and renamed as Club Irapuato.

== Past Crest ==
The club's crest has always featured a whale since the 1950s.

== See also ==
- Football in Mexico
