= 2010–11 Liga Premier de Ascenso season =

Liga Premier de Ascenso
- Season: 2010–11
- Dates: 27 August 2010 – 21 May 2011
- Champions: Apertura: Celaya; Clausura; Chivas Rayadas
- Promoted: Celaya
- Relegated: Irapuato
- Stats are from the regular season only

The 2010–11 Liga Premier de Ascenso season was split in two tournaments Independencia and Revolución. Liga Premier was the third-tier football league of Mexico. The season was played between 27 August 2010 and 21 May 2011.

== Teams ==
=== Group 1 ===
Location of teams in the 2010–11 LPA Group 1

Club	City	Stadium	Capacity
Atlético Tapatío	Chalco, State of Mexico	Arreola	2,500
Cuautitlán	Cuautitlán, State of Mexico	Los Pinos	5,000
Guerreros de Acapulco	Acapulco, Guerrero	Unidad Deportiva Acapulco	13,000
Inter Playa	Playa del Carmen, Quintana Roo	Unidad Deportiva Mario Villanueva Madrid	7,500
Lozaro	Oaxtepec, Morelos	Centro Vacacional IMSS	9,000
Ocelotes UNACH	Tapachula, Chiapas	Olímpico de Tapachula	11,000
Orizaba	Orizaba, Veracruz	Socum	7,000
Patriotas de Córdoba	Córdoba, Veracruz	Rafael Murillo Vidal	3,800
Potros UAEM	Toluca, State of Mexico	Alberto "Chivo" Córdoba	32,603
Pumas Naucalpan	Cuernavaca, Morelos	Centenario	14,800
Tecamachalco	Ciudad Nezahualcóyotl, State of Mexico	Neza 86	20,000
Tulancingo	Tulancingo, Hidalgo	Primero de Mayo	2,500
Tiburones Rojos de Córdoba	Veracruz, Veracruz	Rafael Murillo Vidal	3,800

=== Group 2 ===
Location of teams in the 2010–11 LPA Group 2

Club	City	Stadium	Capacity
Bravos	Nuevo Laredo, Tamaulipas	Unidad Deportiva Benito Juárez	5,000
Celaya	Celaya, Guanajuato	Miguel Alemán Valdés	23,182
Cruz Azul Jasso	Jasso, Hidalgo	10 de Diciembre	7,761
Ebano FC	Ebano, San Luis Potosí	Municipal de Ebano	2,000
Excélsior	Salinas Victoria, Nuevo León	Centro Deportivo Soriana	2,000
Irapuato	Irapuato, Guanajuato	Sergio León Chávez	25,000
La Piedad	Silao, Guanajuato	Municipal de Silao	3,000
Real Saltillo Soccer	Saltillo, Coahuila	Olímpico Francisco I. Madero	7,000
Querétaro "B"	Querétaro City, Querétaro	Unidad Deportiva La Cañada	2,000
San Miguel Caudillos	San Miguel de Allende, Guanajuato	José María "Capi" Correa	4,000
Tampico Madero	Tampico Madero, Tamaulipas	Tamaulipas	19,668
Unión de Curtidores	León, Guanajuato	La Martinica	11,000
U.A. Tamaulipas	Ciudad Victoria, Tamaulipas	Eugenio Alvizo Porras	5,000

=== Group 3 ===
Location of teams in the 2010–11 LPA Group 3

Club	City	Stadium	Capacity
Águilas Reales	Zacatecas City, Zacatecas	Francisco Villa	14,000
Búhos de Hermosillo	Hermosillo, Sonora	Hundido ITSON; Héroe de Nacozari	8,000; 18,747
Cachorros UdeG	Guadalajara, Jalisco	Jalisco	55,020
Chivas Rayadas	Zapopan, Jalisco	Verde Valle	800
Delfines de Los Cabos	Cabo San Lucas, Baja California Sur (Independencia); Puerto Vallarta, Jalisco (Revolución)	Complejo Don Koll; Municipal Agustín Flores Contreras	3,500; 3,000
Deportivo Guamúchil	Guamúchil, Sinaloa	Coloso del Dique	5,000
Dorados Los Mochis	Los Mochis, Sinaloa	Centenario LM	11,134
Dorados UACH	Chihuahua City, Chihuahua	Olímpico Universitario José Reyes Baeza	22,000
Loros UdeC	Colima City, Colima	Estadio Olímpico Universitario de Colima	11,812
Obregón	Ciudad Obregón, Sonora	Manuel "Piri" Sagasta; Hundido ITSON	4,000; 8,000
Vaqueros	Tonalá, Jalisco	Revolución Mexicana	4,000

== Torneo Independencia ==
=== Regular season ===
==== Group 1 ====
===== League table =====
Pos	Team	Pld	W	D	L	GF	GA	GD	Pts	Qualification or relegation
1	Potros UAEM	12	6	3	3	23	14	+9	24	Liguilla de Ascenso
2	Tecamachalco	12	6	3	3	25	13	+12	23	Liguilla de Ascenso
3	Guerreros de Acapulco	12	6	3	3	17	15	+2	23	Liguilla de Ascenso
4	Tiburones Rojos de Córdoba	12	6	3	3	20	10	+10	22	Liguilla de Ascenso
5	Inter Playa del Carmen	12	4	5	3	15	13	+2	22	Liguilla de Ascenso
6	Ocelotes UNACH	12	6	2	4	18	20	−2	21	
7	Patriotas de Córdoba	12	5	2	5	15	14	+1	17	
8	Cuautitlán	12	4	3	5	20	25	−5	16	
9	Atlético Tapatío	12	4	3	5	21	22	−1	15	
10	Pumas Naucalpan	12	4	2	6	13	15	−2	14	
11	Titanes de Tulancingo	12	3	4	5	13	16	−3	14	
12	Albinegros de Orizaba	12	3	2	7	7	17	−10	13	
13	Lozaro	12	3	1	8	5	18	−13	10	

Source: RSSSF

===== Results =====
Home \ Away	ATP	CUA	GAC	IPC	LOZ	OUC	ORI	PTC	UEM	PUM	TEC	TRC	TUL
Atlético Tapatío	—	0–1	—	—	4–0	6–1	—	—	—	2–1	1–4	0–6	—
Cuautitlán	—	—	—	—	—	2–2	0–0	—	2–1	—	—	1–1	1–2
Guerreros Acapulco	3–1	3–2	—	—	—	1–0	2–2	2–1	—	—	1–2	2–1	—
Inter Playa	1–1	3–2	0–1	—	—	1–0	—	3–2	—	—	1–1	0–0	—
Lozaro	—	1–2	1–0	2–1	—	0–1	—	0–1	—	—	0–3	—	—
Ocelotes UNACH	—	—	—	—	—	—	1–1	—	2–2	4–0	—	4–0	2–1
Orizaba	0–0	—	—	0–3	0–0	—	—	—	0–1	1–0	—	—	1–0
Patriotas Córdoba	2–0	1–1	—	—	—	0–1	2–0	—	2–2	—	2–0	0–3	—
Potros UAEM	1–1	—	3–0	3–1	4–0	—	—	—	—	2–1	—	—	1–2
Pumas Naucalpan	—	6–2	0–0	0–0	0–1	—	—	2–1	—	—	2–0	—	—
Tecamachalco	—	2–4	—	—	—	7–0	3–0	—	1–0	—	—	0–0	2–2
TR Córdoba	—	—	—	—	1–0	—	2–0	—	2–3	2–0	—	—	2–0
Tulancingo	2–2	—	2–2	1–1	1–0	—	—	4–1	—	0–1	—	—	—

Source: Liga BBVA MX
Legend: Blue = home team win; Yellow = draw; Red = away team win.

==== Group 2 ====
===== League table =====
Pos	Team	Pld	W	D	L	GF	GA	GD	Pts	Qualification or relegation
1	Tampico Madero	12	9	1	2	32	10	+22	28	Liguilla de Ascenso
2	Celaya	12	7	4	1	25	9	+16	28	Liguilla de Ascenso
3	Querétaro	12	8	2	2	22	8	+14	27	Liguilla de Ascenso
4	Bravos de Nuevo Laredo	12	7	2	3	30	23	+7	25	Liguilla de Ascenso
5	Cruz Azul Jasso	12	6	3	3	16	11	+5	22	Liguilla de Ascenso
6	Unión de Curtidores	12	4	6	2	12	10	+2	21	Liguilla de Ascenso
7	U.A. Tamaulipas	12	4	3	5	15	20	−5	17	
8	San Miguel Caudillos	12	4	3	5	12	14	−2	16	
9	Real Saltillo Soccer	12	1	5	6	11	20	−9	11	
10	Irapuato	12	3	1	8	16	24	−8	10	
11	Ebano FC	12	2	3	7	11	25	−14	10	
12	La Piedad	12	3	1	8	13	31	−18	10	
13	Excélsior	12	2	2	8	10	20	−10	8	

Source: RSSSF

===== Results =====
Home \ Away	BRA	CEL	CAJ	EBA	EXC	IRA	LPD	QUE	RSS	SMC	TAM	UDC	UAT
Bravos	—	—	—	—	5–3	4–1	—	—	3–2	—	1–3	1–2	—
Celaya	2–2	—	—	—	—	3–1	—	—	4–0	—	2–1	0–0	—
Cruz Azul Jasso	1–2	1–1	—	—	—	—	2–1	0–2	—	1–0	—	2–0	—
Ebano FC	2–2	1–5	0–0	—	3–0	—	—	—	—	—	—	1–1	0–2
Excélsior	—	0–1	0–3	—	—	—	3–0	0–2	—	1–2	—	—	1–1
Irapuato	—	—	1–2	3–0	1–0	—	1–3	—	—	1–2	—	—	4–2
La Piedad	1–4	0–3	—	2–0	—	—	—	2–3	1–1	2–0	—	1–2	—
Querétaro	4–1	2–0	—	3–0	—	2–0	—	—	1–0	—	1–2	1–1	—
Real Saltillo S.	—	—	1–1	1–4	0–0	3–1	—	—	—	—	1–2	—	0–0
San Miguel	1–2	1–1	—	1–1	—	—	—	1–0	2–1	—	1–2	0–0	—
Tampico Madero	—	—	0–2	3–0	2–0	2–1	9–0	—	—	—	—	—	5–0
Unión de Curtidores	—	—	—	—	0–2	1–1	—	—	1–1	—	1–1	—	1–0
U.A. Tamaulipas	1–3	0–3	3–1	—	—	—	3–0	1–1	—	2–1	—	—	—

Source: Liga BBVA MX
Legend: Blue = home team win; Yellow = draw; Red = away team win.

==== Group 3 ====
===== League table =====
Pos	Team	Pld	W	D	L	GF	GA	GD	Pts	Qualification or relegation
1	Loros UdeC	10	7	1	2	24	11	+13	22	Liguilla de Ascenso
2	Vaqueros	10	6	3	1	13	5	+8	21	Liguilla de Ascenso
3	Cachorros UdeG	10	6	2	2	19	13	+6	21	Liguilla de Ascenso
4	Búhos de Hermosillo	10	4	3	3	15	13	+2	17	Liguilla de Ascenso
5	Dorados UACH	10	5	1	4	8	13	−5	17	Liguilla de Ascenso
6	Chivas Rayadas	10	5	1	4	13	11	+2	16	
7	Deportivo Guamúchil	10	5	0	5	17	13	+4	15	
8	Dorados Los Mochis	10	3	3	4	15	15	0	15	
9	Obregón	10	3	1	6	11	14	−3	10	
10	Delfines de Los Cabos	10	2	2	6	11	19	−8	10	
11	Águilas Reales de Zacatecas	10	0	1	9	3	22	−19	1	

Source: RSSSF

===== Results =====
Home \ Away	ARZ	BUH	CUG	CHI	DEL	DLM	DUC	GUA	LUC	OBR	VAQ
Águilas Reales	—	0–1	0–1	0–3	2–2	—	0–1	—	—	—	—
Búhos Hermosillo	—	—	—	—	—	3–2	—	—	2–1	3–1	1–1
Cachorros UdeG	—	1–0	—	0–2	4–2	—	—	—	—	—	1–1
Chivas Rayadas	—	1–1	—	—	2–1	4–1	—	1–0	—	5–0	—
Delfines Los Cabos	—	1–1	—	—	—	1–0	—	—	1–3	—	1–2
Dorados Los Mochis	3–0	—	3–3	—	—	—	2–0	2–1	—	1–2	—
Dorados UACH	—	2–1	0–1	1–0	2–1	—	—	—	—	—	1–0
Guamúchil	3–0	3–2	2–4	—	3–0	—	4–0	—	—	1–0	—
Loros UdeC	4–0	—	4–3	1–1	—	1–1	3–0	1–0	—	4–2	—
Obregón	2–0	—	0–1	—	0–2	—	1–1	—	—	—	—
Vaqueros	2–1	—	—	1–0	—	0–0	—	3–0	2–0	1–0	—

Source: Liga BBVA MX
Legend: Blue = home team win; Yellow = draw; Red = away team win.

=== Liguilla ===
The fifth or sixth best teams of each group play two games against each other on a home-and-away basis. The higher seeded teams play on their home field during the second leg. The winner of each match up is determined by aggregate score. In the Round of 8, quarterfinals and semifinals, if the two teams are tied on aggregate the higher seeded team advances. In the final, if the two teams are tied after both legs, the match goes to extra time and, if necessary, a penalty shoot-out.

Round of 16
1	Tampico Madero	0	4	4
14	Unión de Curtidores	1	0	1
8	Loros UdeC	1	2	3
11	Inter Playa	1	3	4
4	Bravos	2	4	6
7	Guerreros Acapulco	2	1	3
5	Potros UAEM	0	2	2
6	Tecamachalco	3	3	6
2	Celaya	0	5	5
16	Dorados UACH	0	3	3
12	Vaqueros	1	1	2 (4)
10	Cruz Azul Jasso (pen.)	2	0	2 (5)
3	Querétaro (pen.)	1	1	2 (5)
15	Búhos Hermosillo	1	1	2 (4)
13	Cachorros UdeG	1	0	1
9	TR Córdoba	0	4	4

Quarter-finals
1	Tampico Madero	2	2	4
11	Inter Playa	1	0	1
4	Bravos	2	1	3
6	Tecamachalco	3	3	6
2	Celaya (pen.)	0	0	0 (4)
10	Cruz Azul Jasso	0	0	0 (3)
3	Querétaro	3	0	3
9	TR Córdoba	1	0	1

Semi-finals
1	Tampico Madero	4	3	7
6	Tecamachalco	1	1	2
2	Celaya	1	4	5
3	Querétaro	0	0	0

Final
1	Tampico Madero	2	2	4 (1)
2	Celaya (pen.)	3	1	4 (3)

==== Round of 16 ====
Team 1	Agg.	Team 2	1st leg	2nd leg
Tampico Madero	4–1	Unión de Curtidores	0–1	4–0
Loros UdeC	3–4	Inter Playa	1–1	2–3
Bravos	6–3	Guerreros de Acapulco	2–2	4–1
Potros UAEM	2–6	Tecamachalco	0–3	2–3
Celaya	5–3	Dorados UACH	0–0	5–3
Vaqueros	2–2 (4–5)	Cruz Azul Jasso	1–2	1–0
Querétaro (pen.)	2–2 (5–4)	Búhos de Hermosillo	1–1	1–1
Cachorros UdeG	1–4	TR Córdoba	1–0	0–4

===== First leg =====
24 November 2010	Tecamachalco	3–0	Potros UAEM	Ciudad Nezahualcóyotl
14:00	Iturbide 46'; Quintana 57'; San Román 84'	Report		Stadium: Estadio Neza 86; Attendance: 500; Referee: Uriel Olvera Ríos

24 November 2010	Guerreros de Acapulco	2–2	Bravos	Acapulco
15:00	Pérez 43', 59'	Report	Gallardo 33', 87'	Stadium: Unidad Deportiva Acapulco; Attendance: 1,000; Referee: Pablo Sánchez Yamasaki

24 November 2010	Inter Playa	1–1	Loros UdeC	Playa del Carmen
15:00	Alpuche 85'	Report	Vizcarra 29'	Stadium: Unidad Deportiva Mario Villanueva Marín; Attendance: 400; Referee: Josué Roldán Amaro

24 November 2010	TR Córdoba	0–1	Cachorros UdeG	Boca del Río
16:00		Report	Navarrete 84'	Stadium: Estadio Luis "Pirata" Fuente; Attendance: 200; Referee: Roberto Ríos Jácome

24 November 2010	Dorados UACH	0–0	Celaya	Chihuahua City
19:00		Report		Stadium: Estadio Olímpico Universitario José Reyes Baeza; Attendance: 300; Referee: José Ulises García Fernández

24 November 2010	Búhos de Hermosillo	1–1	Querétaro	Ciudad Obregón
19:00	Félix 32'	Report	Amaya 68'	Stadium: Estadio Hundido ITSON; Attendance: 100; Referee: Manuel Fabián Medina Rojo

24 November 2010	Unión de Curtidores	1–0	Tampico Madero	León
20:00	Palomera 12'	Report		Stadium: Estadio La Martinica; Attendance: 1,500; Referee: Julio César Mondragón Robles

25 November 2010	Cruz Azul Jasso	2–1	Vaqueros	Ciudad Cooperativa Cruz Azul
15:00	Caballero 31'; Marín 43'	Report	Plascencia 13'	Stadium: Estadio 10 de Diciembre; Attendance: 250; Referee: Quetzalli Alvarado Godínez

===== Second leg =====
27 November 2010	Potros UAEM	2–3 (2–6 agg.)	Tecamachalco	Toluca
11:00	González 17'; Monroy 73' (o.g.)	Report	Quintana 58', 89'; Iturbide 71'	Stadium: Estadio Universitario Alberto "Chivo" Córdoba; Attendance: 300; Referee: Rafael Villegas Ángel

27 November 2010	Cachorros UdeG	0–4 (1–4 agg.)	TR Córdoba	Guadalajara
12:00		Report	López 38' (o.g.); Vázquez 66', 89'; Castillo 83'	Stadium: Estadio Jalisco; Attendance: 300; Referee: Édgar Homero Ruiz Díaz

27 November 2010	Querétaro	1–1 (2–2 agg.) (5–4 p)	Búhos de Hermosillo	Querétaro City
16:00	Zamarripa 69'	Report	Silva 90'	Stadium: Unidad Deportiva La Cañada; Attendance: 2,000; Referee: Sergio León Hernández

27 November 2010	Tampico Madero	4–0 (4–1 agg.)	Unión de Curtidores	Tampico and Ciudad Madero
19:00	Cortés 21', 82', 91'; Cruz 39'	Report		Stadium: Estadio Tamaulipas; Attendance: 4,000; Referee: Rodrigo Cervantes Muñoz

27 November 2010	Bravos	4–1 (6–3 agg.)	Guerreros de Acapulco	Nuevo Laredo
19:30	Moreno 1' (o.g.); Fernández 8', 41'; Nuñez 89'	Report	Tavera 21'	Stadium: Unidad Deportiva Benito Juárez; Attendance: 1,500; Referee: Óscar Alejandro Aguilar Villanueva

27 November 2010	Celaya	5–3 (5–3 agg.)	Dorados UACH	Celaya
20:00	García 8', 57'; Riestra 19'; Vázquez 47'; Hernández 59'	Report	Santana 22'; Castrellón 38'; Gónzalez 67'	Stadium: Estadio Miguel Alemán Valdés; Attendance: 3,000; Referee: Emerson Gustavo Zamora Ramírez

27 November 2010	Loros UdeC	2–3 (3–4 agg.)	Inter Playa	Colima City
20:00	García de León 10', 81'	Report	Reyes 31'; Alpuche 48', 52'	Stadium: Estadio Olímpico Universitario de Colima; Attendance: 2,000; Referee: Jesús Bisguerra Mendiola

28 November 2010	Vaqueros	1–0 (2–2 agg.)	Cruz Azul Jasso	Tonalá
15:00	Castellanos 45'	Report		Stadium: Unidad Deportiva Revolución Mexicana; Attendance: 500; Referee: Marcos Adrián Aguilar Montes de Oca

==== Quarter-finals ====
Team 1	Agg.	Team 2	1st leg	2nd leg
Tampico Madero	4–1	Inter Playa	2–1	2–0
Bravos	3–4	Tecamachalco	2–2	1–2
Celaya (pen.)	0–0 (4–3)	Cruz Azul Jasso	0–0	0–0
Querétaro	3–1	TR Córdoba	3–1	0–0

===== First leg =====
1 December 2010	Tecamachalco	2–2	Bravos	Ciudad Nezahualcóyotl
14:00	Iturbide 34'; Vázquez 88'	Report	Fernández 3', 82'	Stadium: Estadio Neza 86; Attendance: 200; Referee: Jesús Bisguerra Mendiola

1 December 2010	TR Córdoba	1–3	Querétaro	Boca del Río
14:00	Castillo 90+1'	Report	Morales 16' del Real 37'; Almanza 45'	Stadium: Estadio Luis "Pirata" Fuente; Attendance: 100; Referee: Baruch Absalón Castellanos

1 December 2010	Inter Playa	1–2	Tampico Madero	Playa del Carmen
15:00	Pérez 67'	Report	Sánchez 7'; Cortés 13'	Stadium: Unidad Deportiva Mario Villanueva Marín; Attendance: 500; Referee: Rodolfo Jaír Villanueva Pérez

1 December 2010	Cruz Azul Jasso	0–0	Celaya	Ciudad Cooperativa Cruz Azul
15:00		Report		Stadium: Estadio 10 de Diciembre; Attendance: 600; Referee: Adalid Maganda Villalva

===== Second leg =====
4 December 2010	Querétaro	0–0 (3–1 agg.)	TR Córdoba	Querétaro City
16:00		Report		Stadium: Unidad Deportiva La Cañada; Attendance: 5,000; Referee: Reinhold Enrique Ortíz Tienda

4 December 2010	Tampico Madero	2–0 (4–1 agg.)	Inter Playa	Tampico and Ciudad Madero
19:00	Cruz 10'; Estrada 70'	Report		Stadium: Estadio Tamaulipas; Attendance: 6,000; Referee: Humberto Sánchez Reyna

4 December 2010	Bravos	1–2 (3–4 agg.)	Tecamachalco	Nuevo Laredo
19:30	García 10'	Report	Iturbide 17', 64'	Stadium: Unidad Deportiva Benito Juárez; Attendance: 2,000; Referee: Marco Antonio Ortíz Nava

4 December 2010	Celaya	0–0 (0–0 agg.) (4–3 p)	Cruz Azul Jasso	Celaya
20:00		Report		Stadium: Estadio Miguel Alemán Valdés; Attendance: 12,000; Referee: Julio César Mondragón Robles

==== Semi-finals ====
Team 1	Agg.	Team 2	1st leg	2nd leg
Tampico Madero	7–2	Tecamachalco	4–1	3–1
Celaya	5–0	Querétaro	1–0	4–0

===== First leg =====
8 December 2010	Tecamachalco	1–4	Tampico Madero	Ciudad Nezahualcóyotl
14:00	Iturbide 69'	Report	Cruz 3', 45'; Sánchez 43'; Cortés 64'	Stadium: Estadio Neza 86; Attendance: 250; Referee: Baruch Absalón Castellanos

8 December 2010	Querétaro	0–1	Celaya	Querétaro City
16:00		Report	Ramos 3'	Stadium: Unidad Deportiva La Cañada; Attendance: 2,000; Referee: Arturo Serratos Alcaraz

===== Second leg =====
11 December 2010	Tampico Madero	3–1 (7–2 agg.)	Tecamachalco	Tampico and Ciudad Madero
19:00	Díaz 29'; Cortés 69'; Cruz 83'	Report	Iturbide 19'	Stadium: Estadio Tamaulipas; Attendance: 8,000; Referee: Emerson Gustavo Zamora Ramírez

11 December 2010	Celaya	4–0 (5–0 agg.)	Querétaro	Celaya
20:00	Hernández 6', 42'; Garza 44'; Clemens 76'	Report		Stadium: Estadio Miguel Alemán Valdés; Attendance: 7,000; Referee: Arturo Cruz Hurtado

==== Final ====
Team 1	Agg.	Team 2	1st leg	2nd leg
Tampico Madero	4–4 (1–3)	(pen.) Celaya	2–3	2–1

===== First leg =====
15 December 2010	Celaya	3–2	Tampico Madero	Celaya
20:00	Riestra 56'; Garza 71'; Hernández 85'	Report	Cruz 5', 49'	Stadium: Estadio Miguel Alemán Valdés; Attendance: 15,000; Referee: Edgar Homero Ruiz Diaz

===== Second leg =====
18 December 2010	Tampico Madero	2–1 (4–4 agg.) (1–3 p)	Celaya	Tampico and Ciudad Madero
19:00	Cortés 26', 27'	Report	Riestra 7'	Stadium: Estadio Tamaulipas; Attendance: 30,000; Referee: Arturo Cruz Hurtado

Independencia 2010 winners

2nd title

== Torneo Revolución ==
=== Regular season ===
==== Group 1 ====
===== League table =====
Pos	Team	Pld	W	D	L	GF	GA	GD	Pts	Qualification or relegation
1	Cuautitlán	12	6	5	1	19	10	+9	24	Liguilla de Ascenso
2	Inter Playa del Carmen	12	7	2	3	17	10	+7	24	Liguilla de Ascenso
3	Potros UAEM	12	5	5	2	17	9	+8	23	Liguilla de Ascenso
4	Atlético Tapatío	12	5	4	3	18	13	+5	21	Liguilla de Ascenso
5	Titanes de Tulancingo	12	6	2	4	22	20	+2	20	Liguilla de Ascenso
6	Lozaro	12	5	3	4	17	13	+4	19	
7	Guerreros de Acapulco	12	4	4	4	12	11	+1	19	
8	Tiburones Rojos de Córdoba	12	5	2	5	14	13	+1	18	
9	Tecamachalco	12	2	7	3	13	20	−7	17	
10	Pumas Naucalpan	12	3	4	5	14	19	−5	15	
11	Ocelotes UNACH	12	2	4	6	13	20	−7	13	
12	Patriotas de Córdoba	12	2	3	7	12	23	−11	11	
13	Albinegros de Orizaba	12	2	3	7	8	15	−7	10	

Source: RSSSF

===== Results =====
Home \ Away	ATP	CUA	GAC	IPC	LOZ	OUC	ORI	PTC	UEM	PUM	TEC	TRC	TUL
Atlético Tapatío	—	—	4–1	2–1	—	—	1–0	3–1	0–0	—	—	—	1–2
Cuautitlán	2–2	—	1–0	1–2	0–0	—	—	5–1	—	2–1	1–1	—	—
Guerreros Acapulco	—	—	—	0–0	1–1	—	—	—	0–0	1–1	—	—	3–1
Inter Playa	—	—	—	—	3–1	—	—	—	1–0	1–0	—	—	3–1
Lozaro	3–0	—	—	—	—	—	2–1	—	0–2	3–0	—	1–0	2–3
Ocelotes UNACH	1–1	2–3	1–0	1–2	0–2	—	—	3–2	—	—	1–1	—	—
Orizaba	—	0–2	0–1	0–3	—	1–1	—	1–0	—	—	1–1	0–1	—
Patriotas Córdoba	—	—	0–1	1–0	1–1	—	—	—	—	2–2	—	—	3–2
Potros UAEM	—	0–0	—	—	—	2–0	2–0	0–0	—	—	2–2	4–1	—
Pumas Naucalpan	1–0	—	—	—	—	4–2	1–1	—	1–4	—	—	2–1	0–1
Tecamachalco	0–3	—	1–4	0–0	2–1	—	—	2–1	—	1–1	—	—	—
TR Córdoba	1–1	1–2	1–0	3–1	—	1–0	—	3–0	—	—	0–0	—	—
Tulancingo	—	0–0	—	—	—	1–1	0–3	—	4–1	—	5–2	2–1	—

Source: Liga BBVA MX
Legend: Blue = home team win; Yellow = draw; Red = away team win.

==== Group 2 ====
===== League table =====
Pos	Team	Pld	W	D	L	GF	GA	GD	Pts	Qualification or relegation
1	Celaya	12	9	2	1	28	8	+20	30	Liguilla de Ascenso
2	Cruz Azul Jasso	12	7	4	1	24	13	+11	27	Liguilla de Ascenso
3	Bravos de Nuevo Laredo	12	8	1	3	31	12	+19	26	Liguilla de Ascenso
4	U.A. Tamaulipas	12	6	4	2	13	7	+6	24	Liguilla de Ascenso
5	Tampico Madero	12	7	1	4	25	15	+10	23	
6	Unión de Curtidores	12	5	2	5	12	12	0	17	Liguilla de Ascenso
7	La Piedad	12	4	3	5	13	17	−4	16	
8	Real Saltillo Soccer	12	4	2	6	12	17	−5	16	
9	Excélsior	12	4	2	6	15	18	−3	15	
10	Ebano FC	12	4	1	7	14	22	−8	13	
11	Querétaro	12	1	5	6	10	19	−9	9	
12	San Miguel Caudillos	12	1	4	7	10	30	−20	9	
13	Irapuato	12	1	3	8	9	26	−17	9	Relegated to Liga de Nuevos Talentos

Source: RSSSF

===== Results =====
Home \ Away	BRA	CEL	CAJ	EBA	EXC	IRA	LPD	QUE	RSS	SMC	TAM	UDC	UAT
Bravos	—	3–1	3–1	6–1	—	—	2–2	1–0	—	6–1	—	—	0–1
Celaya	—	—	0–0	2–1	1–0	—	4–0	2–0	—	5–1	—	—	0–0
Cruz Azul Jasso	—	—	—	1–0	3–1	4–1	—	—	1–1	—	4–4	—	3–1
Ebano FC	—	—	—	—	—	1–1	3–1	2–1	3–2	3–1	0–2	—	—
Excélsior	0–4	—	—	1–0	—	4–0	—	—	1–2	—	0–1	0–1	—
Irapuato	1–3	0–4	—	—	—	—	—	0–1	1–2	—	1–2	2–1	—
La Piedad	—	—	1–2	—	0–2	1–1	—	—	—	—	2–1	—	1–1
Querétaro	—	—	1–1	—	2–2	—	0–2	—	—	2–2	—	—	0–0
Real Saltillo S.	2–1	0–3	—	—	—	—	0–1	1–1	—	1–0	—	0–1	—
San Miguel	—	—	0–2	—	2–2	1–1	1–0	—	—	—	—	—	0–2
Tampico Madero	0–2	1–2	—	—	—	—	—	4–1	3–1	5–0	—	1–0	—
Unión de Curtidores	2–0	2–4	0–2	2–0	—	—	0–1	2–1	—	1–1	—	—	—
U.A. Tamaulipas	—	—	—	2–0	1–2	2–0	—	—	1–0	—	2–1	0–0	—

Source: Liga BBVA MX
Legend: Blue = home team win; Yellow = draw; Red = away team win.

==== Group 3 ====
===== League table =====
Pos	Team	Pld	W	D	L	GF	GA	GD	Pts	Qualification or relegation
1	Loros UdeC	10	5	4	1	18	7	+11	23	Liguilla de Ascenso
2	Vaqueros	10	5	3	2	15	8	+7	19	Liguilla de Ascenso
3	Chivas Rayadas	10	5	3	2	19	16	+3	19	Liguilla de Ascenso
4	Búhos de Hermosillo	10	4	3	3	13	13	0	15	Liguilla de Ascenso
5	Delfines Los Cabos	10	3	4	3	15	13	+2	16	Liguilla de Ascenso
6	Cachorros UdeG	10	4	3	3	20	17	+3	16	Liguilla de Ascenso
7	Deportivo Guamúchil	10	1	7	2	7	8	−1	14	
8	Águilas Reales de Zacatecas	10	3	3	4	7	13	−6	13	
9	Dorados UACH	10	3	2	5	16	18	−2	11	
10	Dorados Los Mochis	10	3	1	6	12	14	−2	10	
11	Obregón	10	1	3	6	13	28	−15	8	

Source: RSSSF

===== Results =====
Home \ Away	ARZ	BUH	CUG	CHI	DEL	DLM	DUC	GUA	LUC	OBR	VAQ
Águilas Reales	—	—	—	—	—	1–0	—	0–0	0–5	1–1	2–1
Búhos Hermosillo	1–0	—	4–2	0–1	1–1	—	2–0	0–0	—	—	—
Cachorros UdeG	2–0	—	—	—	—	2–1	2–1	1–1	1–1	5–0	—
Chivas Rayadas	2–1	—	5–2	—	—	—	3–2	—	2–2	—	2–2
Delfines Los Cabos	1–1	—	3–2	3–1	—	—	3–0	0–1	—	2–2	—
Dorados Los Mochis	—	3–0	—	2–0	1–1	—	—	—	0–1	—	0–2
Dorados UACH	0–1	—	—	—	—	5–3	—	1–1	0–0	5–2	—
Guamúchil	—	—	—	1–1	—	1–2	—	—	0–1	—	0–0
Loros UdeC	—	1–1	—	—	2–1	—	—	—	—	—	0–2
Obregón	—	3–4	—	1–2	—	1–0	—	2–2	0–5	—	1–2
Vaqueros	—	2–0	1–1	—	2–0	—	1–2	—	—	—	—

Source: Liga BBVA MX
Legend: Blue = home team win; Yellow = draw; Red = away team win.

=== Liguilla ===
The fifth or sixth best teams of each group play two games against each other on a home-and-away basis. The higher seeded teams play on their home field during the second leg. The winner of each match up is determined by aggregate score. In the Round of 8, quarterfinals and semifinals, if the two teams are tied on aggregate the higher seeded team advances. In the final, if the two teams are tied after both legs, the match goes to extra time and, if necessary, a penalty shoot-out.

Round of 16
2	Cruz Azul Jasso	1	1	2
14	Cachorros UdeG	0	1	1
6	U.A. Tamaulipas	0	0	0
11	Vaqueros	1	0	1
3	Bravos	3	4	7
10	Tulancingo	0	0	0
9	Potros UAEM	1	2	3
13	Unión de Curtidores	1	1	2
1	Celaya	1	5	6
16	Búhos Hermosillo	1	0	1
4	Cuautitlán	3	0	3
9	Atlético Tapatío	1	3	4
7	Loros UdeC	1	4	5
15	Delfines	1	0	1
5	Inter Playa	0	2	2
12	Chivas Rayadas	0	4	4

Quarter-finals
2	Cruz Azul Jasso	2	3	5
11	Vaqueros	3	1	4
3	Bravos	2	4	6
9	Potros UAEM	1	2	3
1	Celaya	3	4	7
9	Atlético Tapatío	1	1	2
7	Loros UdeC	1	1	2
12	Chivas Rayadas	1	2	3

Semi-finals
2	Cruz Azul Jasso	0	2	2
3	Bravos	4	5	9
1	Celaya	2	1	3 (4)
12	Chivas Rayadas (pen.)	2	1	3 (5)

Final
3	Bravos	0	0	0
12	Chivas Rayadas	1	1	2

==== Round of 16 ====
Team 1	Agg.	Team 2	1st leg	2nd leg
Cruz Azul Jasso	2–1	Cachorros UdeG	1–0	1–1
U.A. Tamaulipas	0–1	Vaqueros	0–1	0–0
Bravos	7–0	Tulancingo	3–0	4–0
Potros UAEM	3–2	Unión de Curtidores	1–1	2–1
Celaya	6–1	Búhos de Hermosillo	1–1	5–0
Cuautitlán	3–4	Atlético Tapatío	3–1	0–3
Loros UdeC	5–1	Delfines	1–1	4–0
Inter Playa	2–4	Chivas Rayadas	0–0	2–4

===== First leg =====
13 April 2011	Cachorros UdeG	0–1	Cruz Azul Jasso	Guadalajara
11:00		Report	Valverde 19'	Stadium: Estadio Jalisco; Attendance: 100; Referee: Marcos Adrián Aguilar Montes de Oca

13 April 2011	Tulancingo	0–3	Bravos	Tulancingo
15:00		Report	Alanís 7'; García 42'; Núñez 50'	Stadium: Estadio Primero de Mayo; Attendance: 1,000; Referee: Jonathan Hernández Juárez

13 April 2011	Vaqueros	1–0	U.A. Tamaulipas	Tonalá
16:00	Morales 44'	Report		Stadium: Unidad Deportiva Revolución Mexicana; Attendance: 200; Referee: Jorge Luis Delgado Salas

13 April 2011	Delfines	1–1	Loros UdeC	Puerto Vallarta
16:30	Martínez 57'	Report	Sánchez 56'	Stadium: Estadio Municipal Agustín Flores Contreras; Attendance: 200; Referee: Mario Alcántara González

13 April 2011	Unión de Curtidores	1–1	Potros UAEM	León
17:15	Alcántar 65'	Report	Alvarado 13'	Stadium: Estadio La Martinica; Attendance: 250; Referee: Humberto Sánchez Reyna

13 April 2011	Búhos de Hermosillo	1–1	Celaya	Hermosillo
20:00	Fierro 69'	Report	García 17'	Stadium: Estadio Héroe de Nacozari; Attendance: 400; Referee: Manuel Fabián Medina Rojo

14 April 2011	Inter Playa	0–0	Chivas Rayadas	Playa del Carmen
15:00		Report		Stadium: Unidad Deportiva Mario Villanueva Madrid; Attendance: 300; Referee: Rodolfo Jair Villanueva Pérez

14 April 2011	Atlético Tapatío	1–3	Cuautitlán	Chalco
16:00	Vázquez 42'	Report	Álvarez 29'; Castillo 61'; Fuentes 62'	Stadium: Estadio Arreola; Attendance: 200; Referee: Edmundo Schleiden Gutierrez Olazo

===== Second leg =====
16 April 2011	Cruz Azul Jasso	1–1 (2–1 agg.)	Cachorros UdeG	Ciudad Cooperativa Cruz Azul
11:00	López 60'	Report	Marín 40' (o.g.)	Stadium: Estadio 10 de Diciembre; Attendance: 500; Referee: Édgar Homero Ruiz Díaz

16 April 2011	U.A. Tamaulipas	0–0 (0–1 agg.)	Vaqueros	Ciudad Victoria
11:00		Report		Stadium: Estadio Profesor Eugenio Alvizo Porras; Attendance: 300; Referee: Óscar Alejandro Aguilar Villanueva

16 April 2011	Bravos	4–0 (7–0 agg.)	Tulancingo	Nuevo Laredo
19:15	Fernández 19'; Luna 52'; Núñez 63'; Rodríguez 65'	Report		Stadium: Unidad Deportiva Benito Juárez; Attendance: 1,000; Referee: Osvaldo Hernández Cobos

16 April 2011	Celaya	5–0 (6–1 agg.)	Búhos de Hermosillo	Celaya
20:30	Ramos 24'; Castillo 34'; Vázquez 74'; Clemens 80', 86'	Report		Stadium: Estadio Miguel Alemán Valdés; Attendance: 6,000; Referee: Julio César Mondragón Robles

16 April 2011	Loros UdeC	4–0 (5–1 agg.)	Delfines	Colima City
20:00	Rebolledo 60'; Vizcarra 70'; Burciaga 87'; Campos 89'	Report		Stadium: Estadio Olímpico Universitario de Colima; Attendance: 1,000; Referee: Jorge Adán Tonix Vázquez

16 April 2011	Potros UAEM	2–1 (3–2 agg.)	Unión de Curtidores	Toluca
20:00	Reyes 31'; Zárate 56'	Report	Urias 1'	Stadium: Estadio Universitario Alberto "Chivo" Córdoba; Attendance: 350; Referee: Adalid Maganda Villalva

17 April 2011	Chivas Rayadas	4–2 (4–2 agg.)	Inter Playa	Zapopan
10:00	Nieblas 8', 18'; Martínez 38'; Ramírez 68'	Report	Rivera 63'; Carrillo 70'	Stadium: Estadio Omnilife; Attendance: 200; Referee: Jesús Bisguerra Mendiola

17 April 2011	Cuautitlán	0–3 (3–4 agg.)	Atlético Tapatío	Cuautitlán
16:00		Report	Regalado 26'; Zúñiga 38'; Meráz 68'	Stadium: Estadio Los Pinos; Attendance: 1,000; Referee: Uriel Olvera Ríos

==== Quarter-finals ====
Team 1	Agg.	Team 2	1st leg	2nd leg
Cruz Azul Jasso	5–4	Vaqueros	2–3	3–1
Bravos	6–3	Potros UAEM	2–1	4–2
Celaya	7–2	Atlético Tapatío	3–1	4–1
Loros UdeC	2–3	Chivas Rayadas	1–1	1–2

===== First leg =====
20 April 2011	Atlético Tapatío	1–3	Celaya	Chalco
16:00	Vázquez 90+3'	Report	Lozano 33' (o.g.); Ramos 18'; García 88'	Stadium: Estadio Arreola; Attendance: 200; Referee: Ilya Izaskun Flores Florian

20 April 2011	Vaqueros	3–2	Cruz Azul Jasso	Tonalá
16:00	Morán 24'; Martínez 31'; Morales 71'	Report	de la Cruz 33'; Sánchez 84'	Stadium: Unidad Deportiva Revolución Mexicana; Attendance: 200; Referee: Luis Miguel Tapia González

20 April 2011	Chivas Rayadas	1–1	Loros UdeC	Zapopan
17:00	Martínez 53'	Report	Campos 44'	Stadium: Estadio Omnilife; Attendance: 300; Referee: Uriel Olvera Ríos

20 April 2011	Potros UAEM	1–2	Bravos	Toluca
20:00	Alvarado 68'	Report	Fernández 8'; Arciga 54'	Stadium: Estadio Universitario Alberto "Chivo" Córdoba; Attendance: 500; Referee: Jesús Bisguerra Mendiola

===== Second leg =====
23 April 2011	Cruz Azul Jasso	3–1 (5–4 agg.)	Vaqueros	Ciudad Cooperativa Cruz Azul
11:00	López 10', 45'; Caballero 56'	Report	Morales 53'	Stadium: Estadio 10 de Diciembre; Attendance: 500; Referee: Adalid Maganda Villalva

23 April 2011	Bravos	4–2 (6–3 agg.)	Potros UAEM	Nuevo Laredo
19:15	Núñez 8'; Quintero 51'; Luna 70', 75'	Report	Garduño 20'; Zárate 65'	Stadium: Unidad Deportiva Benito Juárez; Attendance: 2,500; Referee: Marco Antonio Ortíz Nava

23 April 2011	Loros UdeC	1–2 (2–3 agg.)	Chivas Rayadas	Colima City
20:00	Galván 4'	Report	Sandoval 89'; Arriaga 90'	Stadium: Estadio Olímpico Universitario de Colima; Attendance: 1,000; Referee: Arturo Cruz Hurtado

23 April 2011	Celaya	4–1 (7–2 agg.)	Atlético Tapatío	Celaya
20:30	Rosas 5'; Hernández 54', 90'; Vázquez 74'	Report	Núñez 34'	Stadium: Estadio Miguel Alemán Valdés; Attendance: 9,000; Referee: Emerson Gustavo Zamora Ramírez

==== Semi-finals ====
Team 1	Agg.	Team 2	1st leg	2nd leg
Cruz Azul Jasso	2–9	Bravos	0–4	2–5
Celaya	3–3 (4–5)	(pen.) Chivas Rayadas	2–2	1–1

===== First leg =====
27 April 2011	Chivas Rayadas	2–2	Celaya	Zapopan
18:00	Arriaga 7'; Nieblas 39'	Report	Hernández 36'; Garza 69'	Stadium: Estadio Omnilife; Attendance: 2,000; Referee: Marco Antonio Ortíz Nava

27 April 2011	Bravos	4–0	Cruz Azul Jasso	Nuevo Laredo
19:15	Alanís 5', 71', 76'; Luna 58'	Report		Stadium: Unidad Deportiva Benito Juárez; Attendance: 2,500; Referee: Osvaldo Hernández Cobos

===== Second leg =====
30 April 2011	Cruz Azul Jasso	2–5 (2–9 agg.)	Bravos	Ciudad Cooperativa Cruz Azul
11:00	Lazo 11'; Trillo 77'	Report	Fernández 3', 51'; Nuñez 65'; Arciga 89'; García 90+1'	Stadium: Estadio 10 de Diciembre; Attendance: Edmundo Schleiden Gutierrez Olazo; Referee: 300

30 April 2011	Celaya	1–1 (3–3 agg.) (4–5 p)	Chivas Rayadas	Celaya
20:30	Riestra 11'	Report	Nieblas 7'	Stadium: Estadio Miguel Alemán Valdés; Attendance: 20,000; Referee: Mario Alcántara González

==== Final ====
Team 1	Agg.	Team 2	1st leg	2nd leg
Bravos	0–2	Chivas Rayadas	0–1	0–1

===== First leg =====
4 May 2011	Chivas Rayadas	1–0	Bravos	Zapopan
10:00	Nieblas 78'	Report		Stadium: Estadio Omnilife; Attendance: 200; Referee: Jesús Bisguerra Mendiola

===== Second leg =====
7 May 2011	Bravos	0–1 (0–2 agg.)	Chivas Rayadas	Nuevo Laredo
19:15		Report	Coronado 66'	Stadium: Unidad Deportiva Benito Juárez; Attendance: 7,000; Referee: Marco Antonio Ortíz Nava

Revolución 2011 winners

1st title

== Relegation Table ==
P	Team	Pts	G	Pts/G
1	Celaya	58	24	2.4166
2	Loros UdeC	45	20	2.2500
3	Bravos de Nuevo Laredo	51	24	2.1250
4	Tampico Madero	51	24	2.1250
5	Cruz Azul Jasso	49	24	2.0416
6	Vaqueros	40	20	2.0000
7	Potros UAEM	47	24	1.9583
8	Inter Playa del Carmen	46	24	1.9166
9	Cachorros UdeG	37	20	1.8500
10	Chivas Rayadas	35	20	1.7500
11	Guerreros de Acapulco	42	24	1.7500
12	U.A. Tamaulipas	41	24	1.7083
13	Cuautitlán	40	24	1.667
14	TR Córdoba	40	24	1.667
15	Tecamachalco	40	24	1.667
16	Búhos de Hermosillo	33	20	1.6500
17	Unión de Curtidores	38	24	1.5833
18	Atlético Tapatío	36	24	1.5000
19	Querétaro	36	24	1.5000
20	Deportivo Guamúchil	29	20	1.4500
21	Titanes de Tulancingo	34	24	1.4166
22	Ocelotes UNACH	34	24	1.4166
23	Dorados UACH	28	20	1.4000
24	Delfines de Los Cabos	26	20	1.3000
25	Dorados Los Mochis	25	20	1.2500
26	Lozaro	29	24	1.2083
27	Pumas Naucalpan	29	24	1.2083
28	Real Saltillo Soccer	27	24	1.1250
29	Patriotas de Córdoba	28	24	1.1666
30	La Piedad	26	24	1.0833
31	San Miguel Caudillos	25	24	1.0416
32	Excélsior	23	24	0.9583
33	Ebano FC	23	24	0.9583
34	Albinegros de Orizaba	23	24	0.9583
35	Obregón	18	20	0.9000
36	Irapuato	19	24	0.7916
37	Águilas Reales de Zacatecas	14	20	0.7000

Last updated: 10 April 2011
Source: Liga Premier FMF
P = Position; G = Games played; Pts = Points; Pts/G = Ratio of points to games played

== Promotion Final ==
The Promotion Final is a series of matches played by the champions of the tournaments Apertura and Clausura, the game is played to determine the winning team of the promotion to Liga de Ascenso. The first leg was played on 14 May 2011, and the second leg was played on 21 May 2011.

Team 1	Agg.	Team 2	1st leg	2nd leg
Celaya	4–3	Chivas Rayadas	1–2	3–1

== First leg ==
14 May 2011	Chivas Rayadas	2–1	Celaya	Zapopan
20:00	Nieblas 4'; Pirales 43'	Report	Clemens 33'	Stadium: Estadio Omnilife; Attendance: 4,300; Referee: Marcos Adrián Aguilar Montes de Oca

== Second leg ==
21 May 2011	Celaya	3–1 (4–3 agg.)	Chivas Rayadas	Celaya
20:30	Rosas 67'; Ocampo 73'; Hernández 80'	Report	Arriaga 49'	Stadium: Estadio Miguel Alemán Valdés; Attendance: 25,000; Referee: Arturo Cruz Hurtado

2010–11 winners

1st title

== See also ==
- 2010–11 Mexican Primera División season
- 2010–11 Liga de Ascenso season
- 2010–11 Liga de Nuevos Talentos season
