= 2004–05 Primera División A season =

Season of a Mexican football league

Primera División A
- Season: 2004–05
- Champions: Apertura: San Luis (2nd Title); Clausura: Querétaro (1st title)
- Promoted: San Luis
- Relegated: Estudiantes de Santander
- Top goalscorer: Apertura: Ariel González (15); Clausura: Ariel González (15)

Primera División A (Méxican First A Division) is a Mexican football tournament. This season was composed of Apertura 2004 and Clausura 2005. San Luis was the winner of the promotion to First Division after winning Querétaro in the promotion playoff.

The national team beat the foreign team, 2–1, in the ninth Primera División A all-star game held at the Estadio León.

== Changes for the 2004–05 season ==
- Leones de Morelos was acquired by new owners, for that reason the team was moved to Querétaro and was renamed to Querétaro F.C.
- Azucareros de Córdoba was relocated in Colima and renamed Huracanes de Colima.
- Guerreros de Tlaxcala was relocated to Ciudad Obregón and renamed Pioneros de Obregón.
- C.D. Guadalajara moved its reserve team, Tapatío, to La Piedad and renamed to Chivas La Piedad.
- Atlante F.C. moved its reserve team, Guerreros de Acapulco, to Ciudad Nezahualcóyotl and renamed Potros Neza.
- Tigrillos moved from Mexico City to Los Mochis and became Tigrillos Broncos.
- Pachuca Juniors and Lobos BUAP were promoted from Second Division.

== Stadiums and locations ==
Location of teams in the 2004-2005 Primera División A

Club	Stadium	Capacity	City
Atlético Mexiquense	Nemesio Díez	35,000	Toluca, State of Mexico
Celaya	Miguel Alemán Valdés	25,000	Celaya, Guanajuato
Chivas La Piedad	Juan N. López	17,000	La Piedad, Michoacán
Coatzacoalcos	Rafael Hernández Ochoa	4,800	Coatzacoalcos, Veracruz
Cobras Juárez	Olímpico Benito Juárez	22,000	Ciudad Juárez, Chihuahua
Correcaminos UAT	Marte R. Gómez	20,000	Ciudad Victoria, Tamaulipas
Cruz Azul Oaxaca	Benito Juárez	15,000	Oaxaca, Oaxaca
Durango	Francisco Zarco	15,000	Durango, Durango
Estudiantes de Santander	Altamira	13,500	Altamira, Tamaulipas
Huracanes de Colima	Colima	17,000	Colima, Colima
León	Nou Camp	35,000	León, Guanajuato
Lobos BUAP	Olímpico BUAP	20,000	Puebla, Puebla
Mérida F.C.	Carlos Iturralde	25,000	Mérida, Yucatán
Pachuca Juniors	Hidalgo	30,000	Pachuca, Hidalgo
Pioneros de Obregón	Manuel "Piri" Sagasta	4,000	Ciudad Obregón, Sonora
Potros Neza	Neza 86	30,000	Ciudad Nezahualcóyotl, State of Mexico
Querétaro	Corregidora	35,000	Querétaro, Querétaro
San Luis	Alfonso Lastras	28,000	San Luis Potosí, S.L.P.
Tabasco	Olímpico de Villahermosa	12,000	Villahermosa, Tabasco
Tigrillos Broncos	Centenario LM	7,000	Los Mochis, Sinaloa

== Apertura 2004 ==
=== Group league tables ===
==== Group 1 ====
Pos	Team	Pld	W	D	L	GF	GA	GD	Pts
1	San Luis	19	10	4	5	46	25	+21	34
2	Atlético Mexiquense	19	9	5	5	28	19	+9	32
3	Tigrillos Broncos	19	8	6	5	25	20	+5	30
4	Huracanes de Colima	19	6	6	7	21	25	−4	24
5	Chivas La Piedad	19	4	5	10	28	41	−13	17

Source: Ascenso MX and Soccerway
Rules for classification: 1st points; 2nd goal difference; 3rd goals scored; 4th head-to-head; 5th away goals scored; 6th draw

==== Group 2 ====
Pos	Team	Pld	W	D	L	GF	GA	GD	Pts
1	Mérida F.C.	19	5	11	3	34	30	+4	26
2	Pioneros de Obregón	19	7	5	7	24	24	0	26
3	Durango	19	5	9	5	27	25	+2	24
4	Tabasco	19	5	7	7	25	39	−14	22
5	Coatzacoalcos	19	5	4	10	24	32	−8	19

Source: Ascenso MX and Soccerway
Rules for classification: 1st points; 2nd goal difference; 3rd goals scored; 4th head-to-head; 5th away goals scored; 6th draw

==== Group 3 ====
Pos	Team	Pld	W	D	L	GF	GA	GD	Pts
1	León	19	9	5	5	26	18	+8	32
2	Cruz Azul Oaxaca	19	7	5	7	29	28	+1	26
3	Celaya	19	6	8	5	23	24	−1	26
4	Pachuca Juniors	19	5	6	8	26	25	+1	21
5	Potros Neza	19	5	4	10	21	30	−9	19

Source: Ascenso MX and Soccerway
Rules for classification: 1st points; 2nd goal difference; 3rd goals scored; 4th head-to-head; 5th away goals scored; 6th draw

==== Group 4 ====
Pos	Team	Pld	W	D	L	GF	GA	GD	Pts
1	Querétaro	19	9	5	5	37	32	+5	32
2	Cobras	19	9	3	7	22	17	+5	30
3	Correcaminos UAT	19	8	6	5	24	24	0	30
4	Lobos BUAP	19	7	6	6	27	26	+1	27
5	Estudiantes Santander	19	3	6	10	19	32	−13	15

Source: Ascenso MX and Soccerway
Rules for classification: 1st points; 2nd goal difference; 3rd goals scored; 4th head-to-head; 5th away goals scored; 6th draw

=== General league table ===
Pos	Team	Pld	W	D	L	GF	GA	GD	Pts
1	San Luis	19	10	4	5	46	25	+21	34
2	Atlético Mexiquense	19	9	5	5	28	19	+9	32
3	León	19	9	5	5	26	18	+8	32
4	Querétaro	19	9	5	5	37	32	+5	32
5	Tigrillos Broncos	19	8	6	5	25	20	+5	30
6	Cobras	19	9	3	7	22	17	+5	30
7	Correcaminos UAT	19	8	6	5	24	24	0	30
8	Lobos BUAP	19	7	6	6	27	26	+1	27
9	Mérida F.C.	19	5	11	3	34	30	+4	26
10	Cruz Azul Oaxaca	19	7	5	7	29	28	+1	26
11	Pioneros de Obregón	19	7	5	7	24	24	0	26
12	Celaya	19	6	8	5	23	24	−1	26
13	Durango	19	5	9	5	27	25	+2	24
14	Huracanes de Colima	19	6	6	7	21	25	−4	24
15	Tabasco	19	5	7	7	25	39	−14	22
16	Pachuca Juniors	19	5	6	8	26	25	+1	21
17	Coatzacoalcos	19	5	4	10	24	32	−8	19
18	Potros Neza	19	5	4	10	21	30	−9	19
19	Chivas La Piedad	19	4	5	10	28	41	−13	17
20	Estudiantes Santander	19	3	6	10	19	32	−13	15

Source: Ascenso MX and Soccerway
Rules for classification: 1st points; 2nd goal difference; 3rd goals scored; 4th head-to-head; 5th away goals scored; 6th draw

=== Results ===
Home \ Away	AMX	CEL	CLP	COA	COB	CRO	DUR	EST	HUC	LEO	LOB	MER	PAC	PIO	PTN	QRO	SNL	TAB	TGR	UAT
At. Mexiquense			3–1			3–2			2–0	2–2	1–1		2–0	0–0			0–2	1–0		3–0
Celaya	0–0		3–1			2–1		1–1	1–1	0–2	1–0			1–1			3–2			1–1
Chivas LP				3–3	4–3	0–1						2–2	2–1		0–1	3–2			0–0	7–0
Coatzacoalcos	1–2	4–1			0–1		2–1	2–0			2–2	2–3			2–0	0–3			1–0	
Cobras	0–1	1–0					2–1	3–0				1–2		1–0		1–2	3–1		2–1	
Cruz Azul				2–2	1–1		3–2					2–1	1–3		1–2	1–2		4–1	2–1	
Durango	3–2	0–0	4–0					1–0	3–0	0–2				1–0			3–3			2–2
Est. Santander	2–1		1–1			2–1			1–2	0–1	0–0			2–2			2–2	0–0		0–1
Huracanes			1–1	0–0	0–1	1–1				3–0			3–1		5–1			2–1		0–3
León			3–0	2–0	2–1	0–1						1–1	1–0		2–1	3–1		3–4		
Lobos BUAP			2–0		1–0	1–2	1–1		0–1	1–1		4–4				3–3			1–0	4–1
Mérida	2–1	4–2					1–1	2–2	0–0					3–1			1–1		1–2	0–1
Pachuca Jrs.		0–2		4–0	0–0		2–2	3–1			0–1	3–3			1–0	3–0			0–0	
Pioneros			4–1	1–0		2–2			3–1	1–0	2–0		1–0				1–0	1–2		1–2
Potros Neza	0–2	1–1			0–0		0–0	4–0			0–1	1–1		4–1		2–1			1–2	
Querétaro	1–1	1–2					3–2	2–1	2–0			3–3		2–2			2–1		2–1	
San Luis			5–2	2–1		4–1			3–0	1–0	3–2		2–2		5–0			6–0		2–0
Tabasco		1–1		3–1	0–1		0–0				1–2	0–0	2–1		3–2	3–3			2–2	
Tigrillos	2–1	2–1					2–2	3–1	1–1	0–0				2–0			2–1			2–1
Correcaminos UAT			2–0	2–1	1–0	0–0				1–1			2–2		2–1	0–2		2–2		

Updated to match(es) played on 20 November 2004. Source: Ascenso MX
Legend: Blue = home team win; Yellow = draw; Red = away team win.

=== Reclasification series ===
Team 1	Agg.	Team 2	1st leg	2nd leg
Tigrillos Broncos	3–2	Pioneros de Obregón	1–2	2–0
Correcaminos UAT	4–3	Cruz Azul Oaxaca	0–3	4–0

==== First leg ====
24 November 2004	Pioneros de Obregón	2–1	Tigrillos Broncos	Ciudad Obregón
20:00	Zaragoza 3'; Morales 47'	Report	Escudero 43'	Stadium: Estadio Manuel "Piri" Sagasta; Referee: Fabián Delgado Horcasitas

25 November 2004	Cruz Azul Oaxaca	3–0	Correcaminos UAT	Oaxaca
16:00		Report		Stadium: Estadio Benito Juárez

==== Second leg ====
27 November 2004	Tigrillos Broncos	2–0 (3–2 agg.)	Pioneros de Obregón	Los Mochis
15:00		Report		Stadium: Estadio Centenario LM

28 November 2004	Correcaminos UAT	4–0 (4–3 agg.)	Cruz Azul Oaxaca	Ciudad Victoria
15:00				Stadium: Estadio Marte R. Gómez

=== Liguilla ===
Quarter-finals
1	San Luis	0	4	4
8	Mérida F.C.	1	3	4
3	León	0	3	3
6	Cobras	2	2	4
2	Atlético Mexiquense	0	2	2
7	Correcaminos UAT	0	1	1
4	Querétaro	3	2	5
5	Tigrillos Broncos	2	2	4

Semi-finals
1	San Luis	1	5	6
6	Cobras	1	1	2
2	Atlético Mexiquense	1	4	5
4	Querétaro	0	3	3

Final
1	San Luis	0	3	3
2	Atlético Mexiquense	1	1	2

==== Quarter-finals ====
Team 1	Agg.	Team 2	1st leg	2nd leg
San Luis	4–4	Mérida	0–1	4–3
León	3–4	Cobras	0–2	3–2
Atlético Mexiquense	2–1	Correcaminos UAT	0–0	2–1
Querétaro	5–4	Tigrillos Broncos	3–2	2–2

===== First leg =====
1 December 2004	Correcaminos UAT	0–0	Atlético Mexiquense	Ciudad Victoria
15:00		Report		Stadium: Estadio Marte R. Gómez; Attendance: 14,000; Referee: José Alfredo Peñaloza Soto

1 December 2004	Tigrillos Broncos	2–3	Querétaro	Los Mochis
15:00	Gomes 34', 81'	Report	Nurse 72'; Casartelli 84', 89'	Stadium: Estadio Centenario LM; Referee: Juan Joel Rangel Maya

1 December 2004	Mérida	1–0	San Luis	Mérida
20:30		Report		Stadium: Estadio Carlos Iturralde; Referee: Francisco Javier Caspeta Aranda

2 December 2004	Cobras	2–0	León	Ciudad Juárez
14:00	Gómez 55'; Marín 89'	Report		Stadium: Estadio Olímpico Benito Juárez; Attendance: 2,000; Referee: Miguel Ángel Chacón Viveros

===== Second leg =====
4 December 2004	Atlético Mexiquense	2–1 (2–1 agg.)	Correcaminos UAT	Toluca
12:00	Caetano 44'; Ruíz 87'	Report	González 73'	Stadium: Estadio Nemesio Díez; Attendance: 500; Referee: Virginia Tóvar Díaz

4 December 2004	San Luis	4–3 (4–4 agg.)	Mérida	San Luis Potosí
19:00	Cervantes 77'; González 78', 89'; Giménez 84'	Report	Leyva 20', 70'; Saucedo 55'	Stadium: Estadio Alfonso Lastras; Referee: José Abramo Lira

4 December 2004	Querétaro	2–2 (5–4 agg.)	Tigrillos Broncos	Querétaro
20:00	Casartelli 4'; Gutiérrez 44'	Report	Gomes 8'; Ojeda 77'	Stadium: Estadio Corregidora; Attendance: 12,314; Referee: Marco Antonio Rodríguez Moreno

5 December 2004	León	3–2 (3–4 agg.)	Cobras	León
12:00	Urbano 33'; López 77'; Gómez 86'	Report	Días 51'; Morales 84'	Stadium: Estadio León; Referee: Héctor Manuel Gómez Ponce

==== Semi-finals ====
Team 1	Agg.	Team 2	1st leg	2nd leg
San Luis	6–2	Cobras	1–1	5–1
Atlético Mexiquense	5–3	Querétaro	1–0	4–3

===== First leg =====
8 December 2004	Cobras	1–1	San Luis	Ciudad Juárez
14:00		Report		Stadium: Estadio Olímpico Benito Juárez

8 December 2004	Querétaro	0–1	Atlético Mexiquense	Querétaro
20:00		Report	Mira 75'	Stadium: Estadio Corregidora; Attendance: 10,000; Referee: Roberto García Orozco

===== Second leg =====
11 December 2004	Atlético Mexiquense	4–3 (5–3 agg.)	Querétaro	Toluca
12:00	Caetano 21', 24', 60' de la Torre 47'	Report	García 40'; Casartelli 48'; Vela 58'	Stadium: Estadio Nemesio Díez; Attendance: 4,000; Referee: Marco Antonio Cuevas Castillo

11 December 2004	San Luis	5–1 (6–2 agg.)	Cobras	San Luis Potosí
19:00	González 10', 41', 58', 81'; Cervantes 71'	Report	Marín 18'	Stadium: Estadio Alfonso Lastras; Attendance: 4,000; Referee: Juan Joel Rangel Maya

==== Final ====
Team 1	Agg.	Team 2	1st leg	2nd leg
San Luis	3–2	Atlético Mexiquense	0–1	3–1

===== First leg =====
15 December 2004	Atlético Mexiquense	1–0	San Luis	Toluca
15:00	Caetano 64'	Report		Stadium: Estadio Nemesio Díez; Referee: Juan Joel Rangel Maya

===== Second leg =====
18 December 2004	San Luis	3–1 (3–2 agg.)	Atlético Mexiquense	San Luis Potosí
19:00	L. González 29'; Giménez 62'; U. González 77'	Report	Caetano 72'	Stadium: Estadio Alfonso Lastras; Attendance: 18,000; Referee: Adolfo Aquino Benítez

Apertura 2004 winners

2nd title

== Clausura 2005 ==
=== Group league tables ===
==== Group 1 ====
Pos	Team	Pld	W	D	L	GF	GA	GD	Pts
1	Huracanes de Colima	19	10	4	5	34	21	+13	34
2	San Luis	19	9	6	4	33	21	+12	33
3	Tigrillos Broncos	19	9	2	8	36	40	−4	29
4	Atlético Mexiquense	19	5	4	10	24	33	−9	19
5	Chivas La Piedad	19	3	8	8	14	32	−18	17

Source: Ascenso MX and Soccerway
Rules for classification: 1st points; 2nd goal difference; 3rd goals scored; 4th head-to-head; 5th away goals scored; 6th draw

==== Group 2 ====
Pos	Team	Pld	W	D	L	GF	GA	GD	Pts
1	Coatzacoalcos	19	8	5	6	29	23	+6	29
2	Durango	19	8	4	7	22	22	0	28
3	Pioneros de Obregón	19	6	6	7	25	28	−3	24
4	Mérida	19	6	5	8	32	32	0	23
5	Tabasco	19	3	8	8	27	34	−7	17

Source: Ascenso MX and Soccerway
Rules for classification: 1st points; 2nd goal difference; 3rd goals scored; 4th head-to-head; 5th away goals scored; 6th draw

==== Group 3 ====
Pos	Team	Pld	W	D	L	GF	GA	GD	Pts
1	Cruz Azul Oaxaca	19	10	5	4	42	29	+13	35
2	Pachuca Juniors	19	10	3	6	25	23	+2	33
3	León	19	10	2	7	34	25	+9	32
4	Celaya	19	9	5	5	26	23	+3	32
5	Potros Neza	19	8	4	7	29	27	+2	28

Source: Ascenso MX and Soccerway
Rules for classification: 1st points; 2nd goal difference; 3rd goals scored; 4th head-to-head; 5th away goals scored; 6th draw

==== Group 4 ====
Pos	Team	Pld	W	D	L	GF	GA	GD	Pts
1	Querétaro	19	7	5	7	28	25	+3	26
2	Cobras	19	5	9	5	26	25	+1	24
3	Lobos BUAP	19	5	6	8	24	27	−3	21
4	Correcaminos UAT	19	5	3	11	29	43	−14	18
5	Estudiantes Santander	19	3	8	8	20	26	−6	17

Source: Ascenso MX and Soccerway
Rules for classification: 1st points; 2nd goal difference; 3rd goals scored; 4th head-to-head; 5th away goals scored; 6th draw

=== General league table ===
Pos	Team	Pld	W	D	L	GF	GA	GD	Pts
1	Cruz Azul Oaxaca	19	10	5	4	42	29	+13	35
2	Huracanes de Colima	19	10	4	5	34	21	+13	34
3	San Luis	19	9	6	4	33	21	+12	33
4	Pachuca Juniors	19	10	3	6	25	23	+2	33
5	León	19	10	2	7	34	25	+9	32
6	Celaya	19	9	5	5	26	23	+3	32
7	Coatzacoalcos	19	8	5	6	29	23	+6	29
8	Tigrillos Broncos	19	9	2	8	36	40	−4	29
9	Potros Neza	19	8	4	7	29	27	+2	28
10	Durango	19	8	4	7	22	22	0	28
11	Querétaro	19	7	5	7	28	25	+3	26
12	Cobras	19	5	9	5	26	25	+1	24
13	Pioneros de Obregón	19	6	6	7	25	28	−3	24
14	Mérida	19	6	5	8	32	32	0	23
15	Lobos BUAP	19	5	6	8	24	27	−3	21
16	Atlético Mexiquense	19	5	4	10	24	33	−9	19
17	Correcaminos UAT	19	5	3	11	29	43	−14	18
18	Estudiantes Santander	19	3	8	8	20	26	−6	17
19	Tabasco	19	3	8	8	27	34	−7	17
20	Chivas La Piedad	19	3	8	8	14	32	−18	17

Source: Ascenso MX and Soccerway
Rules for classification: 1st points; 2nd goal difference; 3rd goals scored; 4th head-to-head; 5th away goals scored; 6th draw

=== Results ===
Home \ Away	AMX	CEL	CLP	COA	COB	CRO	DUR	EST	HUC	LEO	LOB	MER	PAC	PIO	PTN	QRO	SNL	TAB	TGR	UAT
At. Mexiquense		2–3		1–2			2–2	1–0				0–5			1–1				2–0	
Celaya				1–1	2–1		1–0						1–3		1–2	4–2		3–2		
Chivas LP	1–0	1–2					1–0	1–1	1–1					1–1			0–0			1–1
Coatzacoalcos			3–0			3–3				3–1			0–1	1–2				2–0		4–1
Cobras			0–0			2–2			0–2	1–1	3–2				1–1			1–1		4–1
Cruz Azul	1–0	2–0	7–1					2–1	3–2	2–4	2–1			2–0			1–1			3–0
Durango				0–0	0–0	2–1							2–1		2–4	1–0		2–0		
Est. Santander		1–1		1–1	2–3		0–1						0–2		3–1				0–0	
Huracanes		1–0					1–0				3–0	3–0		3–1		0–0	3–1		1–2	
León	1–4							4–1	0–1		2–1			1–1			1–0		4–2	4–2
Lobos BUAP	1–1	0–1		3–1				1–1					0–1				1–1	0–0		
Mérida			2–1	3–1	1–1					1–0	2–3		2–2		2–3	3–2				
Pachuca Jrs.	2–1		2–0			1–0				0–1				1–1			1–0	0–2		
Pioneros	3–0	0–1					1–1	2–1				2–1				2–1			1–3	
Potros Neza			4–1			2–0			2–2	2–1			2–0					1–0		0–1
Querétaro			1–1	0–2	2–0	2–2				1–0	1–2				2–0					4–1
San Luis		2–2			0–0		4–0	1–4				2–1				3–0			3–0	
Tabasco	2–2		1–2			2–3		1–1	2–2					1–1			1–3			
Tigrillos				2–1	4–2						2–1	2–0	5–3		3–2	2–4		3–3		
Correcaminos UAT	3–1						1–0		1–3		2–3	2–1		4–0			1–2		4–2	

Updated to match(es) played on 7 May 2005. Source: Ascenso MX
Legend: Blue = home team win; Yellow = draw; Red = away team win.

=== Reclasification series ===
Team 1	Agg.	Team 2	1st leg	2nd leg
León	5–1	Cobras	0–0	5–1
Celaya	2–4	Durango	1–2	1–2

==== First leg ====
11 May 2005	Cobras	0–0	León	Ciudad Juárez
16:00		Report		Stadium: Estadio Olímpico Benito Juárez; Attendance: 4,000; Referee: José Alfredo Peñaloza Soto

11 May 2005	Durango	2–1	Celaya	Durango
20:00	Zwaricz 38'; Valenzuela 61'	Report	Araujo 4'	Stadium: Estadio Francisco Zarco; Attendance: 7,000; Referee: Hugo León Guajardo

==== Second leg ====
14 May 2005	León	5–1 (5–1 agg.)	Cobras	León
20:00	Fierros 23', 85'; Guerra 35', 81'; Orozco 44' (og)	Report	Gómez 83'	Stadium: Estadio León; Attendance: 20,000; Referee: Héctor Manuel Gómez Ponce

14 May 2015	Celaya	1–2 (2–4 agg.)	.Durango	Celaya
20:30		Report		Stadium: Estadio Miguel Alemán Valdés

=== Liguilla ===
Quarter-finals
4	Pachuca Jrs.	0	1	1
5	León	2	4	6
3	San Luis	1	1	2
7	Coatzacoalcos	2	1	3
2	Huracanes	2	2	4
10	Durango	2	1	3
1	Cruz Azul Oaxaca	0	2	2
11	Querétaro	1	2	3

Semi-finals
6	León	0	3	3
7	Coatzacoalcos	0	1	1
2	Huracanes	0	0	0
11	Querétaro	3	3	6

Final
6	León	1	1	2
11	Querétaro	2	1	3

==== Quarter-finals ====
Team 1	Agg.	Team 2	1st leg	2nd leg
Pachuca Jrs.	1–6	León	0–2	1–4
San Luis	2–3	Coatzacoalcos	1–2	1–1
Huracanes	4–3	Durango	2–2	2–1
Cruz Azul Oaxaca	2–3	Querétaro	0–1	2–2

===== First leg =====
18 May 2005	Coatzacoalcos	2–1	San Luis	Coatzacoalcos
20:00	Ruíz 83'; Padilla 88'	Report	González 35'	Stadium: Estadio Rafael Hernández Ochoa; Attendance: 2,000; Referee: Fabián Delgado Horcasitas

18 May 2005	Durango	2–2	Huracanes	Durango
20:00	Zwaricz 77', 80'	Report	Da Silva 4'; Rico 86'	Stadium: Estadio Francisco Zarco; Attendance: 20,000; Referee: Sergio Fernando Silva Rigau

19 May 2005	Querétaro	1–0	Cruz Azul Oaxaca	Querétaro
19:00	Mora 59'	Report		Stadium: Estadio Corregidora; Attendance: 5,000; Referee: José Abramo Lira

19 May 2005	León	2–0	Pachuca Jrs.	León
20:30	Fierros 54'; Castañeda 82'	Report		Stadium: Estadio León; Attendance: 20,000; Referee: Miguel Ángel Chacón Víveros

===== Second leg =====
21 May 2005	Huracanes	2–1 (4–3 agg.)	Durango	Tecomán
16:00	Carranza 27'; Hernández 89'	Report	Vera 88'	Stadium: Estadio IAETAC; Attendance: 1,000; Referee: Paul Enrique Delgadillo Haro

21 May 2005	San Luis	1–1 (2–3 agg.)	Coatzacoalcos	San Luis Potosí
21:00	González 79'	Report	Silva 89'	Stadium: Estadio Alfonso Lastras; Attendance: 15,000; Referee: Jose Gabriel Gómez Romero

22 May 2005	Pachuca Jrs.	1–4 (1–6 agg.)	León	Pachuca
12:00	Esqueda 23'	Report	Mendoza 43'; Sarria 71'; Esquivel 88'; Fuentes 89'	Stadium: Estadio Hidalgo; Attendance: 2,500; Referee: José Alfredo Peñaloza Soto

22 May 2005	Cruz Azul Oaxaca	2–2 (2–3 agg.)	Querétaro	Oaxaca
17:00	Monrroy 68'; Ortiz 89'	Report	Tavira 15'; Collazo 43'	Stadium: Estadio Benito Juárez; Attendance: 3,000; Referee: Francisco Javier Caspeta Aranda

==== Semi-finals ====
Team 1	Agg.	Team 2	1st leg	2nd leg
León	3–1	Coatzacoalcos	0–0	3–1
Huracanes	0–6	Querétaro	0–3	0–3

===== First leg =====
25 May 2005	Querétaro	3–0	Huracanes	Querétaro
19:00	García 4'; Salcedo 55'; Nurse 63'	Report		Stadium: Estadio Corregidora; Attendance: 15,000; Referee: Juan Joel Rangel Maya

25 May 2005	Coatzacoalcos	0–0	León	Coatzacoalcos
20:00		Report		Stadium: Estadio Rafael Hernández Ochoa; Attendance: 20,000; Referee: Sergio Fernando Silva Rigau

===== Second leg =====
28 May 2005	Huracanes	0–3 (0–6 agg.)	Querétaro	Tecomán
16:00		Report	Nurse 29'; Collazo 50'; Salcedo 76'	Stadium: Estadio IAETAC; Attendance: 10,000; Referee: José Gabriel Gómez Romero

28 May 2005	León	3–1 (3–1 agg.)	Coatzacoalcos	León
20:00	Sarria 1'; Guerra 34'; Fierros 58'	Report	Olivares 3'	Stadium: Estadio León; Attendance: 25,000; Referee: Jorge Eduardo Gasso Flores

==== Final ====
Team 1	Agg.	Team 2	1st leg	2nd leg
León	2–3	Querétaro	1–2	1–1

===== First leg =====
1 June 2005	Querétaro	2–1	León	Querétaro
19:00	Nurse 18'; Salcedo 63'	Report	Guerra 87'	Stadium: Estadio Corregidora; Attendance: 30,000; Referee: Paul Enrique Delgadillo Haro

===== Second leg =====
4 June 2005	León	1–1 (2–3 agg.)	Querétaro	León
20:00	López 51'	Report	Tavira 43'	Stadium: Estadio León; Attendance: 30,000; Referee: Mauricio Morales Ovalle

Clausura 2005 winners

1st title

== Relegation table ==
Pos.	Team	Pld.	Pts.	Ave.	GD
16.	Mérida	113	140	1.2389	-5
17.	Pioneros de Obregón	113	138	1.2212	-35
18.	Potros Neza	113	135	1.1947	-27
19.	Chivas La Piedad	113	135	1.1947	-34
20.	Estudiantes de Santander	113	132	1.1681	-19

== Campeón de Ascenso 2005 ==
The Promotion Final faced San Luis against Querétaro to determine the winner of the First Division Promotion. San Luis was the winner.

Team 1	Agg.	Team 2	1st leg	2nd leg
San Luis	3–3(5)-(3)	Querétaro	1–2	2–1

=== First leg ===
8 June 2005	Querétaro	2–1	San Luis	Querétaro
19:00	Nurse 51'; Salcedo 73'	Report	Marín 85'	Stadium: Estadio Corregidora; Attendance: 30,000; Referee: Adolfo Aquino Benítez

=== Second leg ===
11 June 2005	San Luis	2–1 (5)-(3) (a.e.t.) (3–3 agg.)	Querétaro	San Luis Potosí
19:00	Giménez 45+2'; González 110'	Report	79'	Stadium: Estadio Alfonso Lastras; Attendance: 25,000

Champions

2nd title

=== Relegation play-out ===
The Football Association determined the celebration of a promotion series between the penultimate team of the Primera 'A' Relegation Table against the runner-up of the Second Division, this series faced Chivas La Piedad against the Cachorros UdeG. Chivas La Piedad won the series and remained in the category.

Team 1	Agg.	Team 2	1st leg	2nd leg
Chivas La Piedad	4–1	Cachorros UdeG	2–0	2–1

==== First leg ====
21 May 2005	Cachorros UdeG	0–2	Chivas La Piedad	Cocula
12:00		Report		Stadium: Unidad Deportiva El Progreso

==== Second leg ====
28 May 2005	Chivas La Piedad	2–1 (4–1 agg.)	Cachorros UdeG	Guadalajara
16:00		Report		Stadium: Estadio Jalisco
