= Víctor Mora =

Víctor Mora may refer to:

- Víctor Mora (comics) (1931–2016), Spanish writer of comic books
- Víctor Mora (athlete) (born 1944), retired long-distance runner from Colombia
- Víctor Hugo Mora (born 1974), Mexican football manager
