= José Omar Cervantes =

Mexican footballer (born 1985)

Personal information
- Full name: José Omar Cervantes Hernández
- Date of birth: 27 September 1985 (age 41)
- Place of birth: Ecatepec, Estado de Mexico, Mexico
- Height: 1.77 m (5 ft 10 in)
- Position: Forward

Youth career
- –2004: Atlante

Senior career*
Years	Team	Apps	(Gls)
2005–2008	Atlante Tabasco		
2005–2010	Atlante	12	(1)
2006	→ Real Colima (loan)	0	(0)
2008–2010	Potros Chetumal	68	(7)
2011	Mérida	12	(0)
- * Club domestic league appearances and goals

José Omar Cervantes Hernández (born 27 September 1985) is a Mexican former football forward.

He debuted on 10 April 2005 for Atlante in a 3–0 win over Santos Laguna. He also scored his first goal on 13 October 2007, in a 2-1 losing effort against CF Pachuca.

== Honors ==
=== Club ===
Atlante F.C.

- (Mexico) Apertura 2007
