= Rafael Dueñas =

Mexican footballer and manager (born 1982)

Personal information
- Full name: Rafael Alejandro Dueñas González
- Date of birth: 1 August 1982 (age 44)
- Place of birth: Guadalajara, Jalisco, Mexico
- Position: Forward

Team information
- Current team: Salamanca CF UDS (Manager)

Senior career*
Years	Team	Apps	(Gls)
2005	Querétaro	3	(0)

Managerial career
- 2007–2008: UdeG Reserves
- 2009: Soccer Manzanillo
- 2009–2010: UdeG
- 2011: San Miguel Caudillos (Assistant)
- 2013–2014: De los Altos
- 2015: UdeG Reserves
- 2016: De los Altos
- 2017: Tepatitlán
- 2017: Tepic
- 2018–2019: Atlas Reserves
- 2019–2021: Salamanca CF UDS B
- 2020: Salamanca CF UDS (Interim)
- 2021–2022: Salamanca CF UDS B (Assistant)
- 2023–2025: Salamanca CF UDS (Assistant)
- 2025–: Salamanca CF UDS
- * Club domestic league appearances and goals

Rafael Alejandro Dueñas González (born August 1, 1982) is a Mexican football manager and former player.
