= Diego de la Cruz =

Diego de la Cruz may refer to:

- Diego de la Cruz (footballer)
- Diego de la Cruz (painter)
