= Estadio Manuel "Piri" Sagasta =

Stadium in Ciudad Obregón, Sonora, Mexico

- El coloso de la calle Sahuaripa
- Interactive map of Estadio Manuel "Piri" Sagasta
- Location: Ciudad Obregón, Sonora, Mexico
- Coordinates: 27.4983°N 109.9622°W
- Owner: Cajeme Municipality
- Capacity: 3,400
- Surface: Grass

Construction
- Opened: 20 November 1970
- Renovated: 2011–2012

Tenants
- Potros ITSON (American) football; Pioneros de Ciudad Obregón (2004–2005); Misioneros de Ciudad Obregón (2008–2010); Obregón F.C. (2010–2011); Guerreros de Ciudad Obregón (2013–2017); Obson Dynamo F.C. (2020–2021)

Estadio Manuel "Piri" Sagasta is a multi-purpose stadium in Ciudad Obregón, Sonora, Mexico. It has served as the home stadium for multiple local football clubs. The stadium was inaugurated in 1970 and has a capacity of 3,400.

== History ==
The stadium was inaugurated on 20/22 November 1970 with a match between Atlas and Toluca, although it did not initially have a proper name. Following the death of promising local footballer Manuel "Piri" Sagasta at age 26 in 1981, fans successfully lobbied the Cajeme municipal council into naming the stadium in his honor.

After years of neglect, the municipality secured federal funding from CONADE, and the stadium underwent renovations starting in January 2011. In the first phase, the football field was renovated while the westside stands were demolished to increase the running track to the regulation eight lanes. The second phase, which started in mid-2012, consisted of the construction of a perimeter fence and the renovation of the stands, lighting, and other amenities. Despite some calls to install artificial turf, it was decided to keep the grass field.

A new inversion into the stadium was announced by the following municipal president, Rogelio Díaz Brown, in January 2014. Due to excessive use by amateur leagues, often constituting multiple games a day, it was decided to limit its usage to preserve the pitch for the city's professional team at the time, the Guerreros de Ciudad Obregón.

As of 2020, upkeep of the facilities was provided by the Liga Municipal de Futbol Mayor (Municipal Senior Football League).

== Tenants ==
The stadium previously hosted the Sonora Institute of Technology's American football team, the Potros ITSON.

It served as the home stadium of the Pioneros de Ciudad Obregón, an association football club which competed in the second-tier Primera División A for one season in 2004–05. After playing their first home match at the Campo Hundido, the club switched to the Estadio Manuel "Piri" Sagasta thereafter, debuting at the stadium on 28 August 2004 with a 2–0 win over Lobos BUAP in front of 2,500 spectators. On 24 November, the Pioneros hosted the first leg of their reclassification series tie against the Tigrillos Broncos. Ciudad Obregón won the home leg 2–1 in front of 4,000 spectators, but lost the away leg in Los Mochis by a score of 0–2. The club moved to Tijuana ahead of the 2005–06 season.

A new club, the Misioneros de Ciudad Obregón, used the Estadio Manuel "Piri" Sagasta as their home stadium during their two-year tenure in the fourth-tier Tercera División de México from 2008 to 2010. In their inaugural match on 20 September 2008, the Misioneros suffered a 0–2 defeat to the visiting Halcones de Tijuana.

Another club, Obregón F.C., used the stadium for its lone season in the third-tier Liga Premier de Ascenso in 2010–11. In their inaugural home match on 25 September 2010, Obregón suffered a 0–2 defeat to the Delfines de Los Cabos.

The Guerreros de Ciudad Obregón, also of the Tercera División, began using the stadium for home matches in 2013; their inaugural match was a 1–2 loss to the Águilas UAS. The Guerreros played in the stadium through their final season in 2016–17. A women's side, the Guerreras de Ciudad Obregón of the Liga Mexicana de Fútbol Femenil, debuted at the stadium in 2020.

A new club, Obson Dynamo F.C., started playing in the stadium in 2020 as members of the Liga MXA Independiente, an independent league. However, the team announced the following year that they would be switching their home venue to the larger Campo Hundido del ITSON ahead of their move to the Liga TDP in 2022–23.

=== Other events ===
In 2014, the stadium was used as a venue during the 28th Juegos Universitarios Estatales (State University Games), which were hosted by the Sonora Institute of Technology. Other venues used for the event included the Arena ITSON, the Gimnasio Municipal Manuel Lira García, the Campo Hundido, and the Polideportivo.

In 2015, it was one of several venues used for the 19th Encuentro Regional Deportivo y Cultural de Universidades Tecnológicas (Regional Sports and Cultural Festival of Technological Universities), which hosted over 500 students from nine universities in Sonora, Baja California, and Baja California Sur for the two-day event.

In 2017, the stadium hosted the football tournament of the Juegos Deportivos Estatales de los Trabajadores (State Worker Games). The Sindicato de Trabajadores y Empleados de la Universidad de Sonora (Universidad de Sonora Employees Union) won the 24-team tournament.

In 2021, the stadium hosted a national tournament organized by the Mexican Semiprofessional Football Federation in the U21 and U17 categories. The stadium has also hosted statewide football competitions in various categories.

Other events include regional Crossfit competitions. Youth sporting events include the Festival Deportivo Jiaki Yeewe and the Mini-Olimpiada Deportiva. It is also used by the Liga Municipal de Atletismo (Municipal Athletics League).

Outside of sports, the stadium hosts a Friday afternoon tianguis in the plaza. In 2021, it was reported that around 320 families set up there every week as vendors.
