= Bravos de Nuevo Laredo (Tercera División) =

Mexican football club

- Full name: Bravos de Nuevo Laredo
- Founded: January 10, 2012; 13 years ago
- Dissolved: 2014; 11 years ago
- Ground: Unidad Deportiva Benito Juárez
- Capacity: 8,000
- League: Mexican Football League Tercera Division
- 2014: 11
- Website: https://web.archive.org/web/20140703204102/http://segundadivisionfmf.org.mx/equipo.asp?ID=122
Home colours	Away colours

The Bravos de Nuevo Laredo was a soccer club in the Mexican Football League Tercera División in Nuevo Laredo, Tamaulipas, Mexico. The team competed in Group XII of the Third Division. The Unidad Deportiva Benito Juárez (Benito Juárez Sport Complex) is their home stadium. The team was affiliated with the Bravos de Nuevo Laredo of the Segunda Division.

== History ==
The Bravos de Nuevo Laredo of the Segunda Division were formed in 2004 by a group of business people in Nuevo Laredo, whose objective is to organize a soccer team in the city with aspirations it will become a professional soccer club. In 2012 the owners established the Bravos de Nuevo Laredo of the Third Mexican Division to develop players for their Second Mexican Division team. In 2014, the Second Division team was bought by new owners and renamed Santos de Soledad, for this reason, the Third Division team became the club's main squad, and the secondary team ceased to exist as such.
