= Óscar Fernández (Mexican footballer) =

Mexican footballer (born 1987)

Personal information
- Full name: Óscar Fernández Monroy
- Date of birth: 23 December 1987 (age 38)
- Place of birth: Mexico City, Mexico
- Height: 1.77 m (5 ft 10 in)
- Position: Striker

Youth career
- Altamira

Senior career*
Years	Team	Apps	(Gls)
2009–2013	Altamira	66	(28)
2010–2011	→ Bravos de Nuevo Laredo (loan)	22	(17)
2011–2012	→ Tecamachalco (loan)	23	(19)
2014–2015	Morelia	29	(2)
2016	→ Necaxa (loan)	18	(1)
2016–2017	Oaxaca	19	(6)
2017	Tampico Madero	13	(0)
2017	Sanarate FC	12	(2)
2020	Toros Neza	0	(0)
- * Club domestic league appearances and goals as of 6 February 2018

Óscar Fernández Monroy (born December 23, 1987) is a former Mexican footballer who last played as a striker for Sanarate FC.

== Club career ==
=== Altamira ===
Fernández made his professional debut on 22 July 2012 against Toros Neza. Oscar Fernandez currently plays with Monarcas Morelia in La Liga MX.
