= Obregón F.C. =

- Full name: Centro Asturiano de México, A.C.
- Nickname: Delfinos (Delfines)
- Founded: 2010
- Ground: Estadio Manuel "Piri" Sagasta; Ciudad Obregón, Sonora
- Capacity: 2,000
- Chairman: Teresa Rodríguez Vázquez
- League: Liga Premier de Ascenso
Home colours	Away colours

Obregón F.C. was a Mexican professional football club based in Ciudad Obregón, Sonora. It competed in the third-tier Liga Premier de Ascenso for one season in 2010–11.

The club played its home games at the Estadio Manuel "Piri" Sagasta.

== Current roster ==
As of June 14, 2010

Note: Flags indicate national team as defined under FIFA eligibility rules; some limited exceptions apply. Players may hold more than one non-FIFA nationality.

No.	Pos.	Nation	Player
1	GK	MEX	Juan Manuel Velázquez Zavala
2	DF	MEX	Carlos Alberto Castro Ruíz
3	DF	MEX	Alonso AlejandroSalas González
4	DF	MEX	Edgardo Jacxiel Guzmán Magaña
5	DF	MEX	Víctor Noé Ríos Gastelum
6	DF	MEX	Jorge Omar Alcántar Suárez
7	FW	MEX	César Rosario Morales Durán
8	MF	MEX	Rosendo Castro Pérez
9	FW	MEX	Miguel Amado Navarro Valdez
10	FW	MEX	Ricardo Gutíerrez Ceballos
11	MF	MEX	Ernesto AlonsVazquez Iribeo
12	MF	MEX	Fierro Garcia Héctor Ismael
13	MF	MEX	José Alejandro Melchor Negrete

No.	Pos.	Nation	Player
14	FW	MEX	Luis Alberto Cazarez Noriega
15	MF	MEX	Sergio Octavio Mejía Sánchez
16	MF	MEX	Martín AlbertoValenzuela Díaz
17	MF	MEX	Alberto Soto Pacheco
18	FW	MEX	José de Jesús López Higuera
19	MF	MEX	Héctor Daniel Farfán Balvaneda
20	MF	MEX	Noé Vicente Ríos Gastelum
21	MF	MEX	Castro Valentín Arredondo
22	FW	MEX	jesús Iván Guzmán Betancourt
23	FW	MEX	Irving Uriel Mejía Favela
26	DF	MEX	Mario Enrique Somera Ruíz
29	GK	MEX	Alfredo García Limones
41	GK	MEX	Bryan Manuel Cárdenas Carrasco
