= San Miguel F.C. Caudillos =

San Miguel F.C.
- Full name: San Miguel F.C. Caudillos
- Founded: 1968
- Ground: Capi Correa, San Miguel de Allende, Guanajuato
- Capacity: 4,000
- Chairman: Marco A. Serrato Maldonado
- League: Segunda División Profesional
| Home colours | Away colours |

San Miguel F.C. Caudillos (Spanish, San Miguel F.C. Warlords) is a football club that plays in the Segunda División Profesional. The club is based in San Miguel de Allende, Guanajuato, Mexico. It is one of the weakest teams in the 2nd Division and is known for crushing losses in one-sided matches (5-0 by Jaiba Brava del Tampico-Madero, 6-1 by Bravos de Nuevo Laredo and humiliated by a weaker team like Ébano F.C. by 3-1). In the Clausura 2011 it finished in the bottom across the entire division and zone board totaling 8 points.

== See also ==
- Football in Mexico
