= Óscar Alanís =

Mexican footballer (born 1986)

Daniel Óscar Alanís García (Note: In this Spanish name, the first or paternal surname is Alanís and the second or maternal family name is García.) (born 2 March 1986 in Mexico City) is a Mexican football (soccer) player.

He currently plays as a forward for Club Universidad Nacional, a Mexico City team commonly known as the Pumas. He joined the Pumas youth system in 2005, coming from a Mexico City amateur club called Las Serpientes de Chinconcuac. Nicknamed "La Serpiente" (The Snake) in reference to his former team, he has yet to debut with the first team; this is something he hopes to achieve this season. He has been called to the Mexican U21 national team in the past.
