= Carlos Ramos (Mexican footballer) =

Mexican footballer (born 1986)

Personal information
- Full name: Carlos Josafat Ramos Ibarra
- Date of birth: 12 November 1986 (age 39)
- Place of birth: Celaya, Guanajuato, Mexico
- Height: 1.82 m (6 ft 0 in)
- Position: Defender

Senior career*
Years	Team	Apps	(Gls)
2008–2013	Celaya	113	(13)
2013–2014	→ Correcaminos UAT (loan)	19	(0)
2014–2016	Necaxa	26	(2)
2016–2017	Zacatepec	30	(0)
2017–2018	Atlético San Luis	10	(0)
2018	Celaya	1	(0)
2019–2020	Venados	27	(1)

Managerial career
- 2022: Venados (Liga TDP) (assistant)
- 2022: Oaxaca (assistant)
- 2025: Oaxaca (assistant)
- * Club domestic league appearances and goals as of 12 February 2019

Carlos Josafat Ramos Ibarra (Note: In this Spanish name, the first or paternal surname is Ramos and the second or maternal family name is Ibarra.) (born December 12, 1986) is a former Mexican professional footballer who last played for Venados of Ascenso MX.
