= Abraham Riestra =

Mexican footballer (born 1988)

Personal information
- Full name: Abraham Isaí Riestra Parra
- Date of birth: 6 June 1988 (age 38)
- Place of birth: León, Guanajuato, México
- Height: 1.77 m (5 ft 10 in)
- Position: Defender

Senior career*
Years	Team	Apps	(Gls)
2007–2008	Universidad del Fútbol	35	(0)
2008–2019	Celaya	117	(7)
2013–2014	→ Dorados de Sinaloa (loan)	23	(0)
2014–2015	→ Necaxa (loan)	25	(1)
2020–2021	Correcaminos	29	(1)
- * Club domestic league appearances and goals as of 14 January 2021

Abraham Riestra (born June 6, 1988) is a Mexican professional footballer who last played for Correcaminos.
