= Guillermo Clemens =

Mexican footballer (born 1988)

Personal information
- Full name: Guillermo Eduardo Clemens Antelo
- Date of birth: 26 November 1988 (age 37)
- Place of birth: Navojoa, Sonora, Mexico
- Height: 1.81 m (5 ft 11 in)
- Position: Forward

Senior career*
Years	Team	Apps	(Gls)
2008–2015	Celaya	113	(22)
2014	→ Atlético San Luis (loan)	10	(3)
2016	→ Correcaminos UAT (loan)	2	(0)
2016	→ Lobos BUAP (loan)	13	(3)
2017–2018	Lobos BUAP	0	(0)
2019	Cafetaleros de Tapachula	5	(0)
- * Club domestic league appearances and goals as of 9 November 2017

Guillermo Eduardo Clemens Antelo (born 26 November 1988) is a Mexican footballer who plays as forward for Cafetaleros de Tapachula.
