= Unidad Deportiva Benito Juárez =

Sports complex in Nuevo Laredo, Tamaulipas, Mexico

The Unidad Deportiva Benito Juárez is a multi-use stadium in Nuevo Laredo. It is currently used mostly for football matches and is the home stadium for Bravos de Nuevo Laredo The stadium has a capacity of 5,000 people.
