= Ebano FC =

Ébano F.C.
- Full name: Ébano F.C.
- Founded: 2007
- Ground: Estadio Municipal, San Luis Potosi
- Capacity: 1,000
- Chairman: Sr. Héctor Tapía Nava
- League: Segunda División Profesional
Home colours	Away colours

Ébano F.C. is a football club that plays in the Mexican Football League Segunda División Profesional. The club is based in Ébano, San Luis Potosi, Mexico.

== See also ==
- Football in Mexico
