= José Antonio Rosas =

Mexican footballer (born 1986)

José Antonio Rosas Martínez (Note: In this Spanish name, the first or paternal surname is Rosas and the second or maternal family name is Martínez.) (born 27 February 1986, in Guadalajara) is a professional Mexican footballer who currently plays for Correcaminos UAT on loan from Dorados de Sinaloa.
