= Ébano, San Luis Potosí =

Coordinates: 22°13′N 98°23′W

Ébano, S.L.P.
- Municipality and town
- Location of the municipality in San Luis Potosí
- Country: Mexico
- State: San Luis Potosí

Population (2020)
  - Total: 40,899
- Time zone: UTC-6 (Zona Centro)

Ébano is a town and municipality in the central Mexican state of San Luis Potosí. It is located in the eastern corner of the state, on the border with Veracruz, in the Huasteca region. Its name comes from the Spanish word for ebony.

The area was the birthplace, on May 14, 1901, of the petroleum industry in Mexico, with the first strike made by the Mexican Petroleum Company of California (later part of Pan American Petroleum and Transport Company), owned by Edward L. Doheny, assisted by geologist Ezequiel Ordóñez of the Mexican Central Railway. In 1914, during the Mexican Revolution, the Battle of Ébano took place in the town.
