= Delfines de Los Cabos F.C. =

- Full name: Delfines de Los Cabos Fútbol Club
- Nickname: Delfines
- Founded: 2007; 19 years ago
- Dissolved: 2011; 15 years ago
- Ground: Don Koll Sports Complex; Cabo San Lucas, Baja California Sur
- Capacity: 1,000
- Chairman: Vicente Aguilar Sosa
- Manager: Vacant
- League: Segunda División de México
Home colours	Away colours

Delfines de Los Cabos Fútbol Club was a Mexican football club based in Cabo San Lucas, Baja California Sur that competed in the Segunda División de México, the third division level of Mexican football.

The club hosted Guadalajara in a preseason friendly on December 20, 2008 to inaugurate the Complejo Deportivo Don Koll. The visitors won 3–0, with a goal coming from Javier "Chicharito" Hernández.

== See also ==
- Football in Mexico
