= Atlante UTN Potros Neza =

Potros Neza
- Full name: Potros Neza Fútbol Club
- Nickname(s): Potros
- Founded: 1988; 37 years ago
- Dissolved: 2010; 15 years ago
- Ground: Estadio Neza 86; Ciudad Nezahualcóyotl, State of Mexico, Mexico
- Capacity: 28,000
- Chairman: José Antonio García
- Manager: Mario Alberto García
- League: Tercera División de México
Home colours	Away colours

Atlante UTN also known as Potros Neza was a Mexican football team based in Ciudad Nezahualcóyotl, State of Mexico and participated in the Tercera División de México. It was a filial team to the Atlante franchise.

== History ==
The team was formed in 1988 when the Correcaminos UAT franchise was purchased and relocated to the city of Neza when they were relegated from the Primera División de México. They played one season in the Segunda División de México in 1988-89 as they won the championship and were promoted.

In their inaugural season in 1988-89, they were able to win the Segunda División de México under the management of Víctor Manuel Vucetich. Although, they were unable to be in the Primera División because before the 1989–90 season they were purchased and relocated to the city of Veracruz, Veracruz and re branded as Tiburones Rojos de Veracruz.

In 2004, Potros Neza played in the Primera División 'A' de México. In the Apertura 2004, they ended up in 5th place in group 3 with 19 points while in the Clausura 2005, they were able to obtain 28 points. In the 2005–06 season, they were relocated to Tampico, Tamaulipas and re branded as Tampico Madero.

For the 2006 season, in the Tercera División de México another team was created in Nezahualcóyotl also with the name of Potros. Potros Neza would end up playing the final two times in the Tercera División. The first were against Atlético Tecomán which they lost and the second was against Búhos de Hermosillo which ended in defeat by an aggregate of 4–2.

They were later renamed as Potros de Hierro de Neza and played in Group VI of the Tercera División de México.

In 2009, Group Pegaso relocated Potros de Chetumal from Quintana Roo to Nezahualcóyotl so they could play in the new Liga de Ascenso de México as Atlante UTN.

On December 11, 2010, Monarcas Morelia and Atlante decided to switch the city of their filial teams. Mérida F.C. the filial team of Monarcas Morelia was moved to the city of Neza to be renamed as Toros Neza, while Potros Neza was also moved to Mérida, Yucatán creating the new team Venados F.C. The team would play their first season as Neza UTN due to regulations of the FMF.

== Stadiums ==
Estadio Neza 86

- Potros Neza (1988-1989)
- Atlante UTN (2002-2010)

== Honours ==
- Segunda División de México:

1988-89

- Tercera División de México:

Runner-up: Clausura 2004, Apertura 2006
