= Diego de la Cruz (footballer) =

Mexican footballer (born 1989)

Diego Jesús de la Cruz Manilla (born 11 April 1989) is a Mexican professional footballer who plays for Tapachula of Ascenso MX on loan Cruz Azul. Also play for the Regals SCA. 2017
