= Víctor Mora (footballer) =

Mexican footballer and manager (born 1974)

Personal information
- Full name: Víctor Hugo Mora Llamas
- Date of birth: 12 July 1974 (age 52)
- Place of birth: Guadalajara, Jalisco, Mexico
- Height: 1.72 m (5 ft 7 1/2 in)
- Position: Defender

Senior career*
Years	Team	Apps	(Gls)
2003	Atlético Cihuatlán	7	(0)
2003–2004	Zacatepec	23	(0)
2004–2005	Querétaro	29	(0)

Managerial career
- 2009–2011: U. de C. (Assistant)
- 2011–2019: U. de C.
- 2020: U. de G. (Assistant)
- 2020–2021: U. de G. Premier
- 2021: U. de G. (Assistant)
- * Club domestic league appearances and goals

Víctor Hugo Mora Llamas (born July 12, 1974), known as Víctor Mora, is a Mexican football manager and former player. Since 2020 he works at U. de G. Premier as Manager.
