= Ciudad Obregón =

Settlement in Mexico

- City
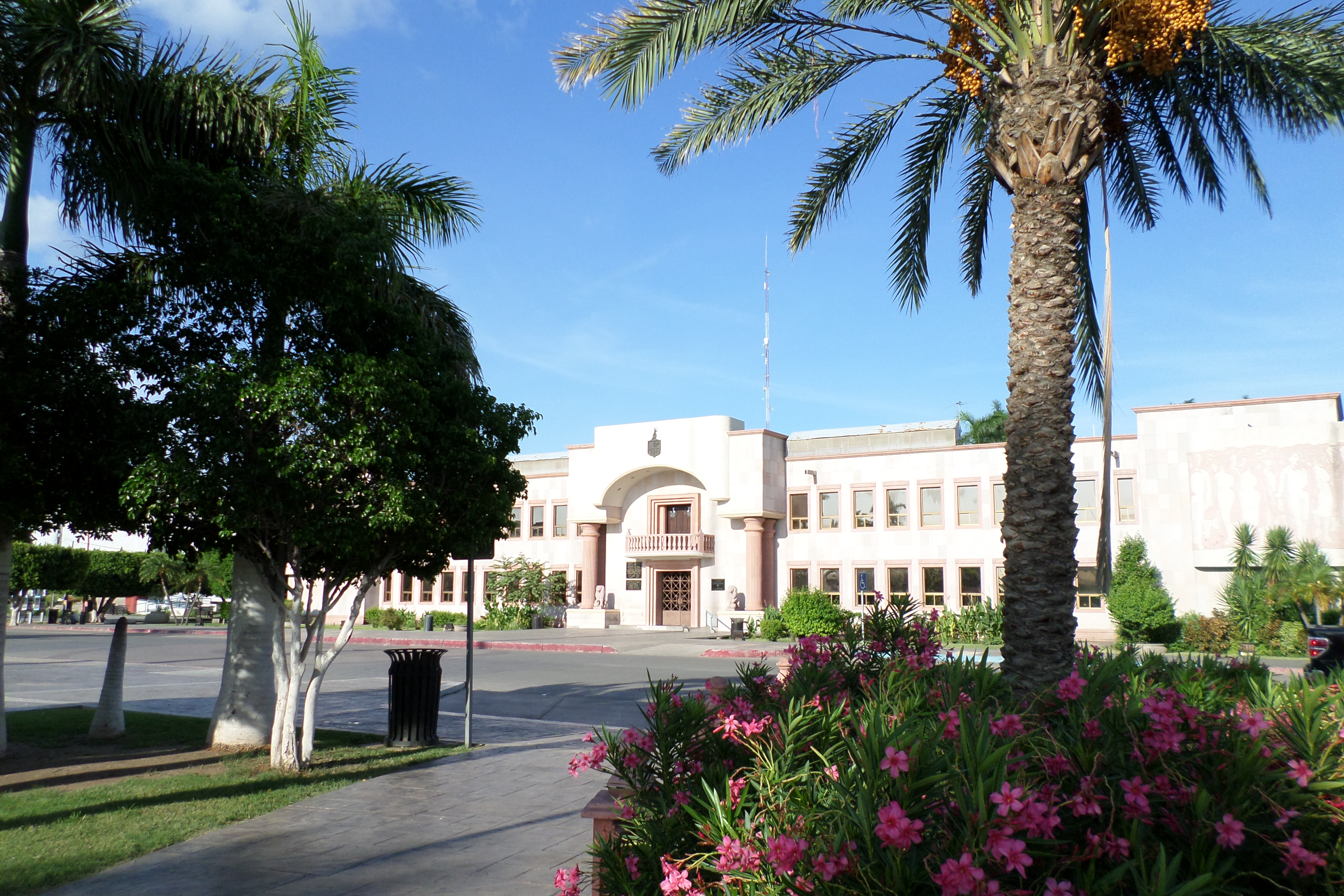
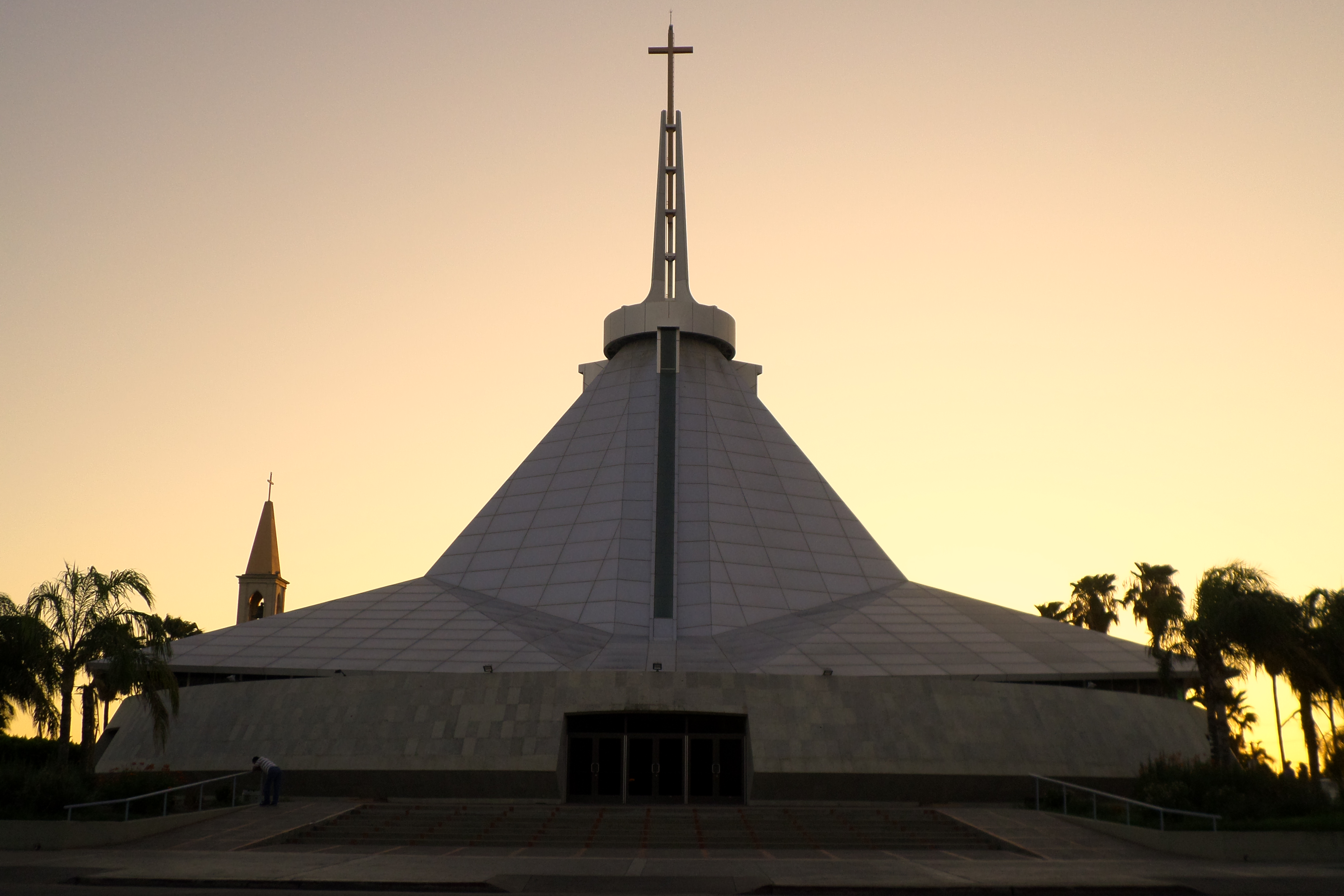
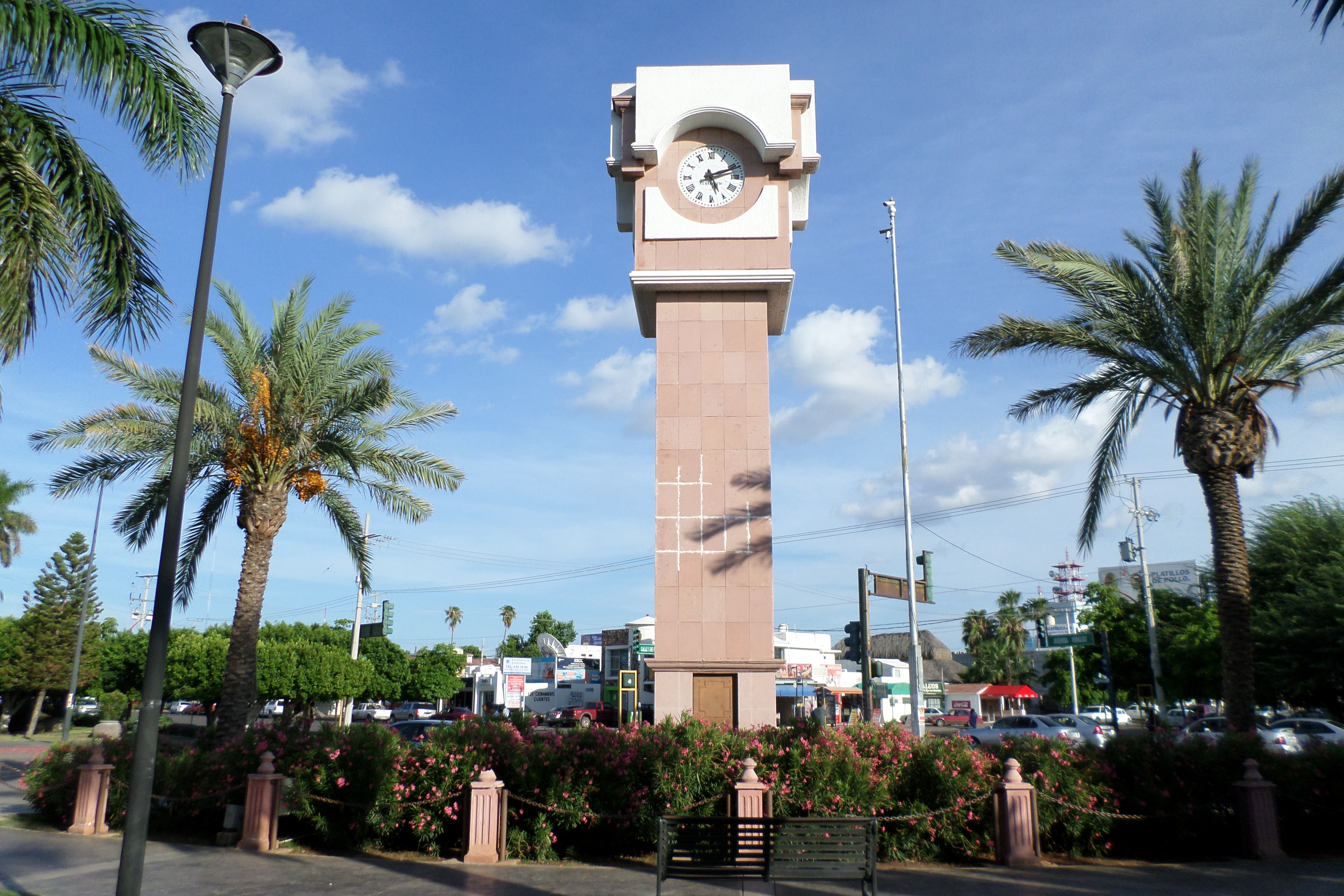
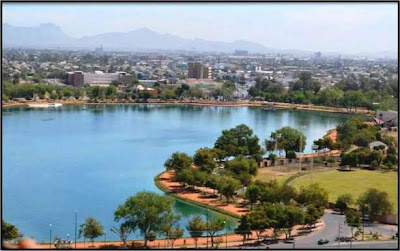
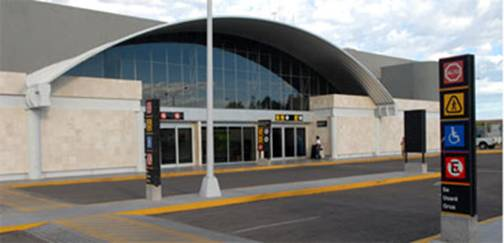
- Municipal Palace, Cathedral of the city, Monumental Clock, Laguna del Nainari, Ciudad Obregón International Airport.

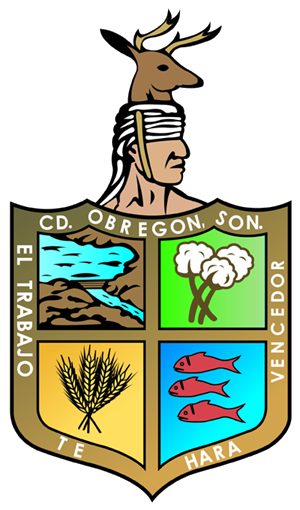
- Coat of arms

- Location within Sonora Location within Mexico Location within North America
- Coordinates: 27°29′21″N 109°56′06″W
- Country: Mexico
- State: Sonora
- Municipality: Cajeme
- Founded: 1927

Government
  - Type: Ayuntamiento
  - Municipal President: Carlos Javier Lamarque Cano

Area
  - Total: 64 km^{2} (25 sq mi)
- Elevation: 40 m (130 ft)

Population (2020)
  - Total: 329,404
  - Density: 5,100/km^{2} (13,000/sq mi)
- Demonym: Obregonense o Cajemense

GDP (PPP, constant 2015 values)
  - Year: 2023
  - Total: $10.6 billion
  - Per capita: $26,900
- Time zone: UTC–07:00 (Zona Pacífico)
- ZIP code: 85000–85059
- Area code: +52 644
- Website: https://www.copreco.mx/ciudadobregon

Ciudad Obregón is a city in southern Sonora. It is the state's second largest city after Hermosillo and serves as the municipal seat of Cajeme. As of 2020, the city has a population of 436,484. Ciudad Obregón is 530 km (330 mi) south of the country's northern border.

== History ==
The city, previously named Cajeme, takes its name from the revolutionary Álvaro Obregón, a native of nearby Huatabampo, Sonora. Álvaro Obregón became president of Mexico after the Revolution and initiated an "agricultural revolution" in the Yaqui Valley, introducing modern agricultural techniques and making this valley one of the most prosperous agricultural regions in the country. Renowned US agronomist Norman Borlaug, the architect of the "Green Revolution" worked here after successful developments in increasing the resistance of wheat. For his efforts, he was later awarded the Nobel Prize. The origins of this city date back to the year 1906 when the company's rail track South Pacific Railway reached this area of the Yaqui Valley. This route made it possible to incorporate with the Mayo Valley to the domestic and external market, attracting a wave of investors and settlers who brought out populations.

In 1907, a flag station, called Cajeme, was established for the locomotive crossing the state to supply water. Cajemé was a Yaqui leader (whose population lives in this area) who fought against them as part of the Porfyrian army and then led the Yaqui rebellion against it Porfirio Díaz.

"The Cajeme station was run by the American Bert Cameron, superintendent, and Emilio Estrella, station manager. They and their families were the first settlers. Soon after, the cowboys arrived to guard the corrals of cattle that from here was sent to other regions. Soon came neighbors of Hope, near the fields cultivated in the Valley." The Yaquis offered resistance to the arrival of the first settlers on their lands.

The first neighborhood was called Plano Oriente. In 1923, 'Cajeme Motors' was installed, owned by American James Huffaker, it was the first auto agency; fact that contributed significantly to the development of Cajeme. At the end of his term as president of the country (1920–1924), the General Alvaro Obregón returned to Sonora and carried out business projects in Navojoa and Cajeme, creating in 1925, the company 'Obregón y Cía.', which provided more work and economic development in the Region. Cajeme was declared the head of the municipality on 29 November 1927 (until then it had been part of Cocorit) by the governor Fausto Topete, and in 1928 the first town hall was installed. On 28 July 1928, 11 days after the assassination of Alvaro Obregón, it was decreed for the name to change to Ciudad Obregón in his recognition, while the name of the municipality was preserved. That same year the first printing press was installed and it was where the first news weekly called 'The Pacific Gazette', owned by Lithuanian immigrant Leo Rosenfeld and his wife, Virginia Gámez, was printed.

The first neighborhoods were Plano Oriente, Ladrillera, Cumuripa, Hidalgo, Constitución, El Castillo, Quinta Díaz, Bella Vista and Colonia del Valle.

Rice was the most important crop in the Yaqui Valley in the early 20th century; other crops also include wheat, beans, chickpeas, various vegetables and alfalfa. Over the course of the century, wheat became the most important crop. Due to Cajeme's agricultural vocation, the first industry of great importance was rice mills.

In the 1950s, the agronomist Norman E. Borlaug, called the Father of the Green Revolution, collaborated with the creation of the Northwest Agricultural Research Center (CIANO) and in 1970 received the Nobel Peace Prize for his work in research developing better varieties of wheat and maize. Then "El Valle Del Yaqui" was called,"The Barn Of Mexico."

At the end of the twentieth century the railway disappeared as a means of transport for passengers and the station was abandoned.

For the realization of economic activities and service to the general public, Ciudad Obregón has offices of the main financial institutions of the country.

== Geography ==
The city is located on the parallel 27–29' north latitude and the meridian 109-59' west longitude. With an altitude above sea level of 40.8 m (134 ft) in the city center.

It is located in the south of the State of Sonora, 50 km (31 mi) from the coast of the Sea of Cortez and 100 km (62 mi) from the Sierra Madre Occidental, is also 240 km (150 mi) from Hermosillo, the capital of the State; and 530 km (330 mi) from the border with the United States.

=== Climate ===
Ciudad Obregón has a steppe climate (Köppen BSh) featuring long, extremely hot summers and short, mild winters with cold mornings. Summer temperatures frequently reach 40 °C (104.0 °F) or more, with overnight lows greater than 24 °C (75 °F) and sometimes reaching 30 °C (86 °F). Sunny skies and clear nights can be expected throughout the year. Many severe thunderstorms with strong winds and sandstorms reach the region in summer. Rainfall is scarce but it is more prominent in the summer. In the winter, daytime temperatures can be hotter than 26 °C (79 °F) but at night the temperature can fall to 2 °C (36 °F). Snow in Ciudad Obregón is nonexistent, but hailstorms can occur during cold fronts.

The extreme temperatures recorded in the box below between 1939 and 2016 were recorded at the Downtown Station of Ciudad Obregón, Sonora.

Climate data for Ciudad Obregón, Sonora (Downtown) (1981–2010, extremes (1961–present)
Month	Jan	Feb	Mar	Apr	May	Jun	Jul	Aug	Sep	Oct	Nov	Dec	Year
Record high °C (°F)	35.2 (95.4)	38.2 (100.8)	41.0 (105.8)	43.2 (109.8)	45.0 (113.0)	46.4 (115.5)	47.5 (117.5)	46.9 (116.4)	46.8 (116.2)	46.1 (115.0)	40.2 (104.4)	35.3 (95.5)	47.5 (117.5)
Mean daily maximum °C (°F)	24.0 (75.2)	26.0 (78.8)	28.9 (84.0)	32.7 (90.9)	35.2 (95.4)	38.3 (100.9)	38.5 (101.3)	38.4 (101.1)	38.0 (100.4)	35.6 (96.1)	30.4 (86.7)	25.5 (77.9)	32.55 (90.59)
Daily mean °C (°F)	15.6 (60.1)	16.7 (62.1)	17.9 (64.2)	20.6 (69.1)	23.5 (74.3)	30.8 (87.4)	32.0 (89.6)	31.8 (89.2)	31.2 (88.2)	25.7 (78.3)	20.1 (68.2)	16.7 (62.1)	22.1 (71.8)
Mean daily minimum °C (°F)	6.3 (43.3)	7.0 (44.6)	8.5 (47.3)	10.5 (50.9)	14.2 (57.6)	20.3 (68.5)	25.5 (77.9)	25.2 (77.4)	24.4 (75.9)	17.7 (63.9)	12.4 (54.3)	8.5 (47.3)	14.2 (57.6)
Record low °C (°F)	−7.1 (19.2)	−5.5 (22.1)	−2.5 (27.5)	−2.5 (27.5)	4.5 (40.1)	8.5 (47.3)	15.0 (59.0)	15.0 (59.0)	10.0 (50.0)	2.2 (36.0)	−1.7 (28.9)	−4.9 (23.2)	−7.1 (19.2)
Average precipitation mm (inches)	25.0 (0.98)	12.8 (0.50)	4.6 (0.18)	3.1 (0.12)	0.2 (0.01)	8.9 (0.35)	78.5 (3.09)	94.0 (3.70)	95.3 (3.75)	24.4 (0.96)	12.3 (0.48)	25.4 (1.00)	384.5 (15.14)
Average precipitation days (≥ 0.1 mm)	2.5	2.0	0.8	0.6	0.1	0.8	9.1	9.4	6.0	2.1	1.7	2.3	37.4
Average relative humidity (%)	70	71	69	63	62	66	73	75	73	67	66	71	69
Mean monthly sunshine hours	237	237	279	298	325	320	275	272	266	276	241	217	3,243
Source 1: Servicio Meteorológico Nacional (temperature, 1981–2010) (humidity, 1981–2000)
Source 2: Deutscher Wetterdienst (sun, 1961–1990) (Note: Station ID for Ciudad Obregon is 76258 Use this station ID to locate the sunshine duration)

== City origins ==
Cajeme Municipality has as its head Ciudad Obregón. Its first settlers established themselves in the neighborhood called Plano Oriente, as irrigation canals made by the Richardson company around 1910 and two years later, the South Pacific railroad established a station called Cajeme. The town of Cajeme was initially a part of Cocorit Municipality until its elevation to Municipal Seat on 28 September 1927. The first city government was established on 1 January 1928. The 28 July 1928 decree stated that "the city is known now with the name of Ciudad Obregón, the town formerly known as Cajeme." In 1937 another legislation stated that Cajeme be the name of the Municipality and Ciudad Obregón its seat.

In 1950, Ciudad Obregón had a population of 120,000.

== Roots and traditions ==
The native Yaqui people are settled in eight towns: Potam, Huiribis, Torim, Cocorit, Bacum, Vicam, Rahum and Belem. Seven kilometres (4.3 miles) from the city is the first of the eight Yaqui towns that make the autonomous territory of these people known for their independent character, because it is one of the few American ethnic groups not dominated militarily by Spanish colonialists.

Yaqui history informs the defense of their territory and culture, an ancestral culture enriched by rites and traditions of which the Deer Dance stands out, a symbolic representation of the hunt for this animal.

== Demographics ==
Ciudad Obregón is the second largest city in Sonora (after state capital Hermosillo) with a 2010 census population of 298,625 people. Its municipality of Cajeme had a population of 409,310.

As of 2005, the per capita income for the municipality of Cajeme was $10,940 and the Human Development Index was 0.8635.

== Government and economy ==
In Ciudad Obregón lies the seat of the municipal government of Cajeme. The government's exercise rests with the Municipal President and his cabinet, elected every three years.

Of the 21 state electoral districts in the Congress of Sonora, three correspond to the city. The municipality of Cajeme has its own federal electoral district, the VI Federal Electoral District of Sonora of the Chamber of Deputies of the Congress of the Union of Mexico.

The main economic activities in the entity are maquiladora, agriculture, livestock, [aquaculture], and trade. However, the fertile lands of the municipality favour agriculture and the services derived from it, such as its suppliers and their transport. Real estate and construction development has also had a major boom in the city that, because of its relatively recent foundation, has been able to be planned with wide avenues and modern urban development compared to other Sonorense cities.

According to the national census prepared by the INEGI, the economically active population (PEA) in 2010 corresponds to 54.1% of the inhabitants of the municipality of whom 95% have an occupation.

== Transportation ==
The city is served by Ciudad Obregón International Airport.

== Education and health ==
The following institutions of higher education are based in Ciudad Obregón:

- Instituto Tecnológico de Sonora (ITSON) – Campus Obregón and Campus Náinari
- Instituto Tecnológico Superior de Cajeme (ITESCA)
- Instituto Tecnológico y de Estudios Superiores de Monterrey (ITESM) – Campus Obregón
- Universidad La Salle – Campus Obregón
- Universidad TecMilenio – Campus Obregón
- Universidad Tecnológica del Sur de Sonora (UTS)
- Universidad del Valle de México Campus Ciudad Obregón (UVM)
- Universidad del Desarrollo Professional Ciudad Obregón (UNIDEP)
- Universidad Vizcaya de las Américas
- Instituto Tecnológico del Valle del Yaqui
- Universidad Durango Santander
- Universidad Interamericana de Desarrollo (UNID)
- Instituto de Capacitación para el trabajo Icatson-Cajeme

According to the 2010 population and housing census of INEGI in Cajeme the literacy rate for people aged 15 to 24 years is 98.5% and that of people aged 25 and over is 96.1%.

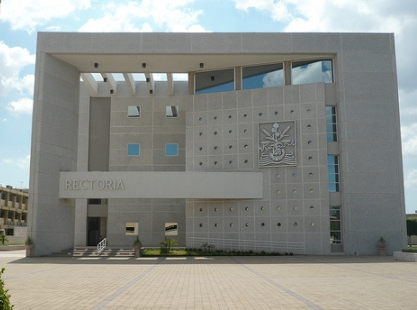
ItSON Rectory

School attendance for people ages 3 to 5 is 44.4%; 6 to 11 years is 97%; 12 to 14 years is 95.1% and 15 to 24 years is 50.5%. Higher Education Institutions Ciudad Obregón has multiple institutions of higher education, and has the most important concentration of these in the south of Sonora. The most important institution is the Instituto Tecnológico de Sonora (ITSON) which has an enrollment of approximately seventeen thousand students. It offers twenty-three bachelor's degrees, and its main campus is located in the city. Ciudad Obregón has the necessary elements to offer the population all academic levels.

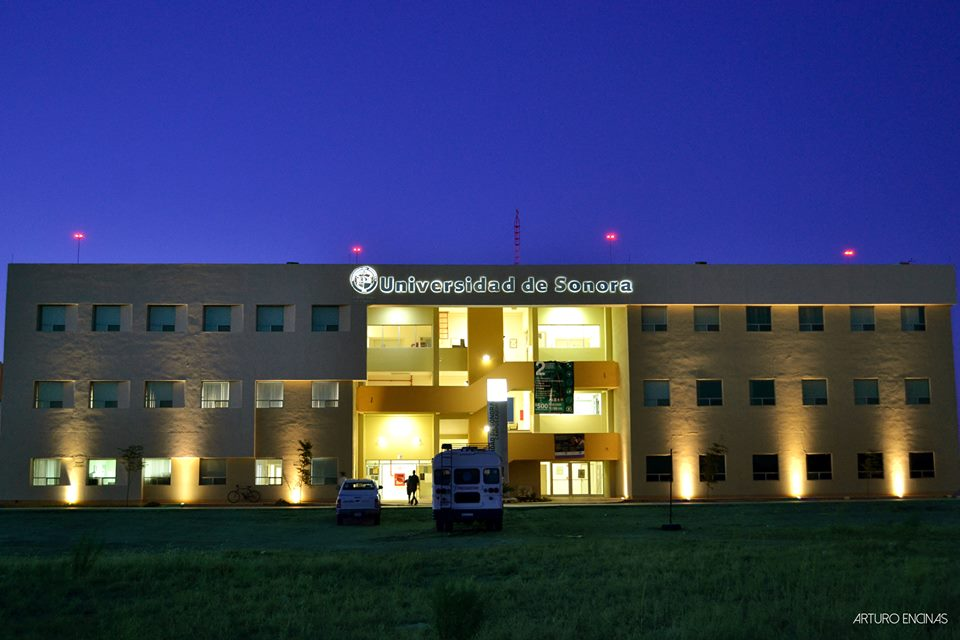
University of Sonora Campus Cajeme, Department of Health Sciences.

In the city there is also an important campus of the University of Sonora, the [Instituto Tecnológico y de Estudios Superiores de Monterrey] (ITESM), La Salle University (ULSA), the University of the Valley of Mexico (UVM), the State Normal School of (ENEE), the Instituto Tecnológico Superior de Cajeme (ITESCA), the Universidad Tecnológico del Sur de Sonora (UTS), among others.

Of these above, they stand out:

- La Salle University located in Obregón City has been operating for 25 years. It is private, Christian-inspired. It has 21 bachelor's degrees and 15 postgraduate degrees on this campus.
- The Cajeme Higher Institute was founded in 1997. It is a public, decentralized university. It has nine bachelor's degrees and 17 specialties.
- The Instituto Tecnológico de Monterrey has 20 bachelor's degrees and 20 master's degrees.
- The Universidad TecMilenio has 15 bachelor's degrees and seven master's degrees.

== Tourism ==
=== Nainari Lagoon ===
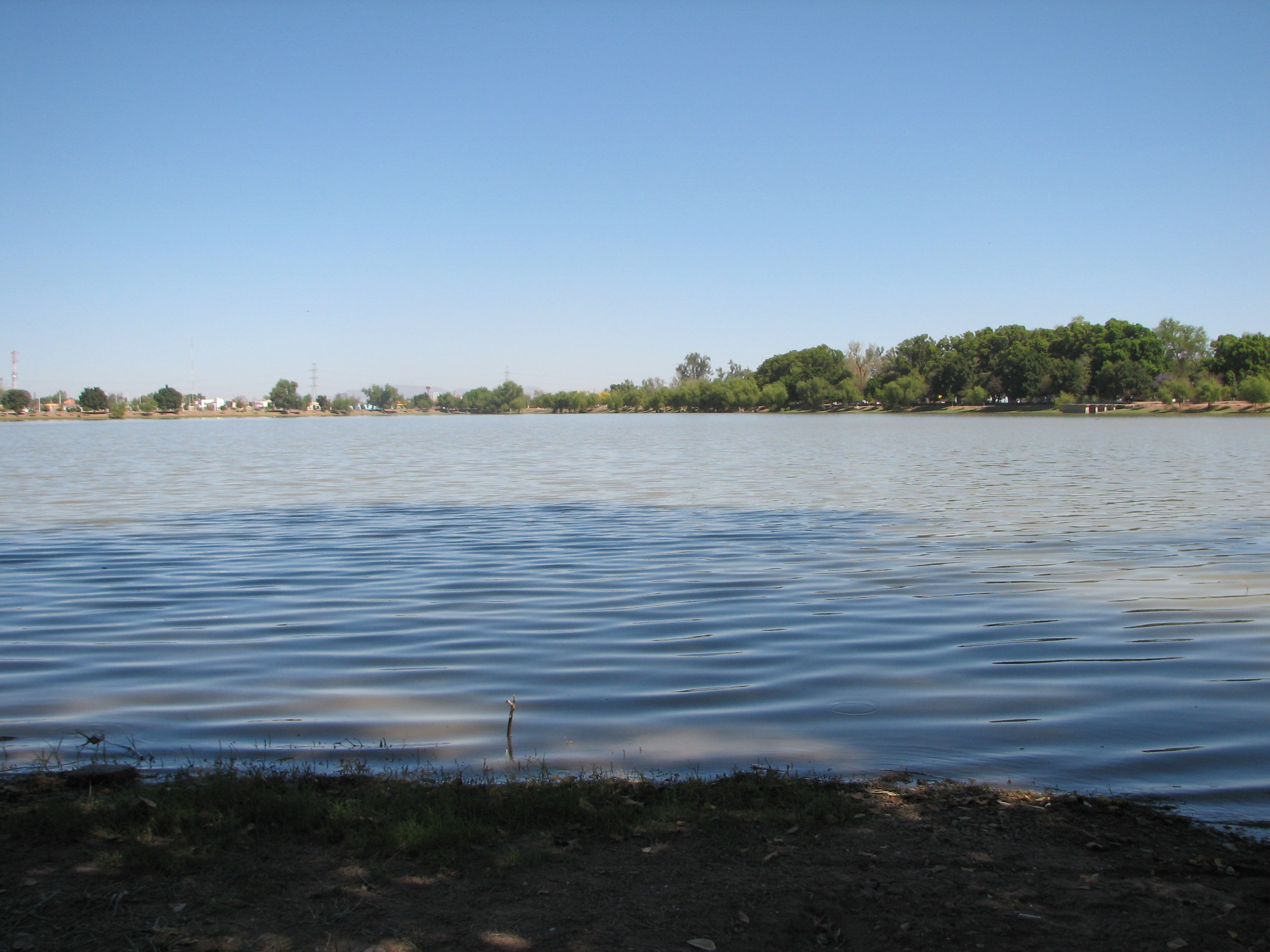
Nainari Lagoon

The "Nainari Lagoon" with a 2 km (1.2 mi) perimeter is located at the western city limits between Guerrero and Padre Eusebio Kino avenues. Its grounds are used for outdoor sports including an outdoor public gym. The lagoon's two piers are a focal point for aquatic activities like skiing, sailing and canoeing being the site for triathlons, marathons, and bicycle races. There are many coconut and snack stands on the lagoon boardwalk where you can find fresh coconuts and other fruits such as "mango con chile" and restaurants.

The Nainari Lagoon is manmade, it was built in 1956 as one of the achievements of City Mayor Rene Gandara, who opened the hydraulic gates to fill the reservoir. Before, it was a lagoon region where there was duck hunting and rice was grown.

The Nainari Lagoon is a tourist attraction that has a small boardwalk and a boat dock. Water is constantly circulating as it is connected to one of the main canals in the irrigation district, the Lower Canal (el Canal Bajo).

The Lagoon has been in recent years better taken care of and upgraded by the local authorities. There is now a small garden with a bronze statue of a discobolus (discus thrower) by the Ostimuri Park entrance. Right next to the lagoon there is a sports complex with an Olympic size swimming pool and many types of sport courts such as tennis, basketball, soccer, and fronton.

=== Ostimuri Children's Park ===
Next to the Nainari Lagoon are the Ostimuru Children's Park and the Ostimuri Zoo. At the park, there is a variety of mechanical rides for children. Lush trees surround the park. The Ostimuri Zoo is located inside the park – This habitat hosts a wide variety of animals, including many birds and a boa.

=== Yaqui Museum ===
The Yaqui museum offers a perspective of Yaqui culture having among its objectives rescuing, preserving, investigating and spreading the culture and lifestyle of the Yaqui tribe. As well as stimulating in the state's population the rediscovery of historical, linguistic and ethnic values of the Yaquis. Another objective is to show Sonoran children the particular characteristics of Yaqui personality and the richness of their folklore and raise consciousness among Sonorans in regards to the development of historical events of the Yaquis as well as the influence that they had in the formation of groups and classes that constitute the regions current society. Scenes of daily life of the Yaqui tribe are represented throughout the museum highlighting musical instruments, hunting tools and clothing that distinguishes them since ancient times.

=== Cocorit House ===
This construction dates from the previous century, using a colonial style architecture. It has four exhibition rooms and an ample garden with permanent samples of painting and sculptures as well as arts and crafts. Among the House's visitors is the internationally renowned sculpture and painter José Luis Cuevas. Among the objectives of Cocorit House is to support art in those people with artistic attributes that don't have enough support. That is why local artists call it the region's haven for the arts.

=== "Álvaro Obregón" Dam ===
The General Álvaro Obregón Dam also called the Oviachic Dam, named taken from the place where it is located, started its construction in the year 1947 and finished in 1952, being filled for the first time in July 1952. It is located 35 kilometres (22 miles) north of Ciudad Obregón.

Lake Oviachic has a surface of 20,500 acres (83 square kilometres) and a storage capacity of 3226 million cubic meters; it is part of the dam system on the Yaqui River, it's the state's largest dam and the third located on said river. From the Oviachic Dam a 27,603-kilometre (17,152-mile) network of main and secondary canals is derived that irrigate 450,000 hectares (1,100,000 acres) of surface in the Yaqui and Mayo Valleys, being one of the most important hydraulic infrastructures in the country. This hydraulic work has become one of the main and most visited tourist destinations in the region.

=== Huivulai Island ===
Huivulai Island is located 50 kilometres (31 miles) south of Ciudad Obregón and 5 miles (8.0 kilometres) off the Sonora coast in the Gulf of California (Sea of Cortez). In Mayo, Huivulai means "long neck". The island is 17 kilometres (10.6 miles) long and 1.2 kilometres (0.7 miles) wide at its widest part. The island features many natural attractions including sand dunes used by four-wheel drive vehicles. The island has a water well oasis surrounded by date trees that attract many species of birds, including gray and white pelicans, corvetta, gray crested cranes, storks, and albatrosses. The island is ringed by beaches and features fishing opportunities off-shore.

== Festivals and cultural programs ==
=== Tetabiakte Art and Culture Festival ===
This festival of art and culture takes place in November to celebrate the anniversary of the founding of the municipality of Cajeme with the support of the Institute of Municipal Culture and the National Council for Culture and the Arts ([CONACULTA]). This festival offers music, painting, film, poetry, book presentations and shows the culture and traditions of the Yaqui ethnic group.

=== ITSON Arts Festival ===
The Festival, promoted by the Instituto Tecnológico de Sonora through the Directorate of Extension of Culture and Services and is held annually in October. The Festival is a member of the National Network of Festivals of the National Council for Culture and the Arts (CONACULTA). The program serves audiences of higher middle education, university and the community at large, through an artistic program representative of our cultural diversity, with national quality groups, with presentations in university forums, public spaces and theatres, with close access to the commun

=== Ars Vocalis México ===
Ars Vocalis México is an international festival and academy dedicated to vocal art that in 2015 is hosted by Ciudad Obregón. This festival, founded by the tenor and cultural promoter Carlos Zapién, has a pedagogical program thanks to which young Mexican singers, previously selected through an audition process, have the opportunity to participate in classes lectures given by renowned figures in the operatic world of Europe and the United States, as well as being able to work with coaches from various opera houses and educational institutions. Students also have the opportunity to work on the German vocal repertoire (Lied), ancient and baroque music and Mexican music. The audience has the opportunity to listen to recitals and operatic performances at no cost.

=== IPN International Book Fair ===
Since 2013, the National Polytechnic Institute has organized the International Book Fair held in September. The program has been attended by renowned figures in the literary field, such as Elena Poniatowska and the program has the cooperation of several governmental and private institutions.

== Sports ==
The most popular sport in Obregón is baseball. The city's professional baseball team is the Yaquis of the Mexican Pacific League, who play at Estadio Tomás Oroz Gaytán.

Ciudad Obregón has multiple sports venues, among which stand out: the "Manuel Lira García" Municipal Gymnasium, with a capacity of 3,000 spectators. The Arena ITSON, with capacity for 7,500 people, and the Estadio Yaquis, can accommodate 16,500 people. As well as small basketball and baseball stadiums scattered throughout the city, these two sports are the most popular of the company.

Ciudad Obregón has the following sports teams:

- Yaquis de Obregón: Baseball team in the Mexican Pacific League
- Halcones de Ciudad Obregón: Basketball team in CIBACOPA
- Obson Dynamo F.C.: Football team in the Liga TDP

Football also has acceptance, with the Estadio Manuel "Piri" Sagasta being the most important venue for its practice with a capacity of approximately 4000 spectators. Although the sport is not as popular in the city, it remains a recreational practice. Next to the football stadium is the sports car "Náinari 2000", an area for the practice of different sports.

The most popular martial discipline in Ciudad Obregón is taekwondo which is practiced by many young people in the municipality of Cajeme, which has multiple medalists in official competitions, nationally and internationally. The ITSON Potros have won three national university championships in Mexico.

Obregón F.C. play professional soccer in the Segunda División.

In 2021, Ciudad Obregón and Hermosillo co-hosted the 3rd U-23 Baseball World Cup, organized by the World Baseball Softball Confederation.

== Gastronomy ==
Ciudad Obregón has a wide variety of typical dishes, such as:

- Wakabaki

The Yaqui ethnic group, one of the most numerous in Mexico, inherited the wakabaki, which is a broth that constitutes a traditional dish that is prepared in its most important festivities. Its ingredients are: chickpea, beef rib, pumpkin, potato, cabbage, carrot and jote. Its preparation begins with the cutting of the firewood and the sacrifice of the res.

- Tortillas Sobaqueras (large flour tortillas)

The Spaniards, who during the Arab domination learned many ways to take advantage of wheat, brought flour tortillas to Sonora. The Yaqui tribe adapted them and colloquially called them "tortillas sobaqueras" these tortillas are made by hand and using a lot of water.

- Cahuamanta

Typically made from manta rays and shrimp, it is usually prepared as a broth in which the manta meat, shrimp and vegetables are added. The broth is served on a plate or you can prepare cahuamanta tacos, when only the broth is served it is called "vichy", in some places that same broth with shrimp is known as "chucki". Its name derives from the word "caguama" (loggerhead sea turtle) and manta ray, originally this dish was prepared with loggerhead sea turtle meat but since the fishing of this marine species is not longer allowed, it was decided to replace the "caguama" with manta meat. The dish was created in the late nineteenth century in Ciudad Obregón.

- Coyotas

Traditional cookies from the state of Sonora. These are made with wheat flour and stuffed with "piloncillo" (raw form of pure cane sugar). Coyotas are similar to Argentine alfajor, but thinner and larger in diameter. In Cd. Obregón you can find in addition to the traditional ones made with "piloncillo"; coyotas filled with "cajeta" (Mexican caramel sauce), "cajeta" and walnut, chocolate, Bavarian cream, guava, strawberry, pineapple, apricot (chabacano), blackberry, mango and apple purees.

- Cecina

Also known as salted dry meat, is a type of dehydrated meat that is made of beef cutting and air drying and during venison season can be made of this animal as well.

- Bacanora

Bacanora, like Jalisco tequila, is a spirit made in Sonora, Mexico. It is a mezcal made 100% of the juice of the roasted maguey head, fermented and distilled. However, the development of the formal market in El Bacanora was truncated in 1915, when the manufacture and marketing of this alcoholic beverage was banned. It was until the 1990s that this activity ceased to be persecuted and sanctioned by customs and its authorization was contemplated in the Law on Alcohols of the State of Sonora.

This agave drink from Sonora is protected by appellation of origin, published in the Official Journal of the Federation on 6 November 2000. In this publication it is officially stated that the State of Sonora, is exclusively the entity, which is recognized as producer of this drink. Agave angustifolia is the only maguey species admitted by this Law for the production of El Bacanora. The territorial area of this denomination area is: 57,923.92 km2 and is composed of 35 municipalities of the mountainous area of Sonora.

== Notable people ==
Some prominent people originating in Ciudad Obregón, or with a track record in their careers connected to the city are:

- Julio César Chávez – Professional boxer
- Giovanny Gallegos – Major League Baseball pitcher
- Hector Velázquez – Major League Baseball pitcher
- Stephanie Sigman – Actress and model. She is best known for her starring role in the 2011 film Miss Bala. She also appeared in the film James Bond Spectre, among others.
- María Félix – Born in Alamos, she is an important figure of the Mexican golden film era. She participated in a total of 47 films, and is known as "The Doña" for his celebrated character.
- Norman Borlaug – Agronomist. He studied wheat, rust and agronomic practices in the Yaqui Valley, looking for it to have self-sufficiency in wheat. He won a Nobel Prize thanks to his practices and research carried out in Obregón. In recognition by the city, one of the main streets bears his name.

== International relations ==
=== Twin towns – Sister cities ===
Ciudad Obregón is twinned with:

- Baton Rouge, Louisiana, United States, since 1977
- Tucson, Arizona, United States, since 1980
