= Bravos de Nuevo Laredo =

Mexican football club

- Full name: Bravos de Nuevo Laredo
- Founded: January 10, 2004; 22 years ago
- Ground: Unidad Deportiva Benito Juárez; Nuevo Laredo, Tamaulipas, Mexico
- Capacity: 5,000
- Chairman: César Martín Valdés Peña
- Manager: Luis Ángel García
- League: Liga TDP - Group XV
- 2021–22: Currently
- Website: https://web.archive.org/web/20140703204102/http://segundadivisionfmf.org.mx/equipo.asp?ID=122
Home colours	Away colours

The Bravos de Nuevo Laredo is a soccer club in the Mexican Football League Liga TDP in Nuevo Laredo, Tamaulipas, Mexico. The Unidad Deportiva Benito Juárez (Benito Juárez Sport Complex) is their home stadium. During Clausura 2011, the Bravos became Liga Premier Sub-Champs.

== History ==
The Bravos are an institution formed in 2004 by a group of business people in Nuevo Laredo, whose objective is to organize a soccer team in the city with aspirations it will become a professional soccer club.

=== League Record ===
Season	Rank	W	L	T
Apertura 2011	20	1	8	5
Clausura 2011	2	8	3	3
Apertura 2012	10	6	5	4
Clausura 2012	19	4	6	5
Apertura 2013	21	4	7	4
Clausura 2014	30	4	10	1
