= 2012–13 Liga Premier de Ascenso season =

Liga Premier de Ascenso
- Season: 2012–13
- Dates: 11 August 2012 – 1 June 2013
- Champions: Apertura: Murciélagos; Clausura; Ballenas Galeana Morelos
- Promoted: Ballenas Galeana Morelos
- Relegated: FC Excélsior; Promesas Altamira
- Top goalscorer: Apertura: Martín Barragán (15 goals); Clausura; Jesús Rodríguez (13 goals)
- Stats are from the regular season only

The 2012–13 Liga Premier de Ascenso season was split in two tournaments Apertura and Clausura. Liga Premier was the third-tier football league of Mexico. The season was played between 11 August 2012 and 1 June 2013.

== Teams ==
32 teams participated in this tournament.

=== Changes from previous season ===
- Reynosa F.C., Indios UACJ, Delfines del Carmen and Promesas Altamira new expansion teams.
- Atlas "B" was promoted from Liga de Nuevos Talentos.
- Real Cuautitlán was promoted from Tercera División.
- Tecamachalco F.C. didn't play this season because the team was being restructured to be promoted to Ascenso MX.
- Tulancingo played in Liga de Nuevos Talentos.
- Lozaro, Guerreros Acapulco and San Miguel Caudillos dissolved.
- Deportivo Guamúchil adopted their unofficial name as official and was renamed as Murciélagos F.C.

==== Group 1 ====
Location of teams in the 2012–13 LPA Group 1

Club	City	Stadium	Capacity
Águilas Reales	Zacatecas City, Zacatecas	Francisco Villa	14,000
Bravos	Nuevo Laredo, Tamaulipas	Unidad Deportiva Benito Juárez	5,000
Cachorros UdeG	Guadalajara, Jalisco	Jalisco	55,020
Chivas Rayadas	Zapopan, Jalisco	Verde Valle	800
Coras de Tepic	Tepic, Nayarit	Arena Cora	12,271
Dorados UACH	Chihuahua City, Chihuahua	Olímpico Universitario José Reyes Baeza	22,000
Excélsior	Salinas Victoria, Nuevo León	Centro Deportivo Soriana	2,000
Estudiantes Tecos "B"	Zapopan, Jalisco	Tres de Marzo	18,750
Indios UACJ	Ciudad Juárez, Chihuahua	Olímpico Benito Juárez	19,703
Loros UdeC	Colima City, Colima	Estadio Olímpico Universitario de Colima	11,812
Deportivo Los Altos	Yahualica, Jalisco	Las Ánimas	8,500
Murciélagos	Guamúchil, Sinaloa	Coloso del Dique	5,000
Real Saltillo Soccer	Saltillo, Coahuila	Estadio Olímpico Francisco I. Madero	7,000
Reynosa	Reynosa, Tamaulipas	Adolfo López Mateos; Unidad Deportiva Solidaridad	10,000; 20,000
U.A. Tamaulipas	Ciudad Victoria, Tamaulipas	Eugenio Alvizo Porras	5,000
Vaqueros	Ameca, Jalisco	Núcleo Deportivo y de Espectáculos Ameca	4,000

==== Group 2 ====
Location of teams in the 2012–13 LPA Group 2

Club	City	Stadium	Capacity
Albinegros de Orizaba	Orizaba, Veracruz	Socum	7,000
Atlas "B"	Zapopan, Jalisco	Alfredo "Pistache" Torres	3,000
Ballenas Galeana Morelos	Xochitepec, Morelos	Mariano Matamoros	16,000
Cruz Azul Jasso	Jasso, Hidalgo	10 de Diciembre	7,761
C.F. Cuautitlán	Cuautitlán, State of Mexico	Alberto Pérez Navarro	3,000
Delfines del Carmen	Ciudad del Carmen, Campeche	UNACAR Campus II	8,985
Inter Playa	Playa del Carmen, Quintana Roo	Unidad Deportiva Mario Villanueva Madrid	7,500
Ocelotes UNACH	Tapachula, Chiapas	Olímpico de Tapachula	11,000
Patriotas de Córdoba	Córdoba, Veracruz	Rafael Murillo Vidal	3,800
Potros UAEM	Toluca, State of Mexico	Alberto "Chivo" Córdoba	32,603
Promesas Altamira	Altamira, Tamaulipas	Altamira	9,581
Querétaro "B"	Querétaro City, Querétaro	Corregidora	35,575
Real Cuautitlán	Cuautitlán, State of Mexico	Los Pinos	5,000
Tampico Madero	Tampico Madero, Tamaulipas	Tamaulipas	19,667
Unión de Curtidores	León, Guanajuato	Centro Deportivo Andrómeda	2,000
Veracruz "B"	Veracruz, Veracruz	Luis "Pirata" Fuente	28,703

== Torneo Apertura ==
=== Regular season ===
==== Group 1 ====
===== Standings =====
Pos	Team	Pld	W	D	L	GF	GA	GD	Pts	Qualification or relegation
1	Coras de Tepic	15	10	4	1	34	16	+18	37	Promotion Playoffs
2	Chivas Rayadas	15	10	1	4	40	18	+22	34	Promotion Playoffs
3	Murciélagos	15	7	6	2	26	14	+12	30	Promotion Playoffs
4	Dorados Fuerza UACH	15	7	5	3	26	16	+10	28	Promotion Playoffs
5	Loros UdeC	15	8	3	4	35	29	+6	28	Promotion Playoffs
6	Cachorros UdeG	15	8	3	4	25	19	+6	27	Promotion Playoffs
7	Bravos de Nuevo Laredo	15	6	4	5	22	17	+5	23	Promotion Playoffs
8	Reynosa	15	5	6	4	33	32	+1	23	Promotion Playoffs
9	U.A. Tamaulipas	15	5	6	4	23	22	+1	23	
10	Deportivo de Los Altos	15	4	7	4	34	24	+10	22	
11	Águilas Reales de Zacatecas	15	3	6	6	18	30	−12	19	
12	Estudiantes Tecos "B"	15	5	2	8	23	27	−4	17	
13	Indios UACJ	15	2	6	7	13	23	−10	14	
14	Vaqueros	15	3	3	9	13	28	−15	13	
15	Real Saltillo Soccer	15	2	3	10	22	38	−16	9	
16	Excélsior	15	2	1	12	8	42	−34	7	

Source: Segunda División FMF

===== Results =====
Home \ Away	ARZ	BRA	CUG	CHI	COR	DFU	EST	EXC	IUJ	LUC	ALT	MUR	RSS	REY	UAT	VAQ
Águilas Reales	—	—	—	—	1–2	0–3	—	2–0	—	3–3	—	—	1–1	3–3	1–1	—
Bravos	2–2	—	0–1	1–0	—	—	3–0	4–0	2–0	—	4–2	0–0	—	—	—	—
Cachorros UdeG	2–0	—	—	—	0–0	3–2	—	2–0	1–0	—	2–2	—	—	4–1	—	3–0
Chivas Rayadas	5–0	—	3–1	—	—	—	3–1	—	5–0	—	—	3–0	—	—	—	—
Coras Tepic	5–1	—	2–1	1–0	—	3–0	—	3–0	1–1	—	2–2	—	—	1–1	—	1–0
Dorados UACH	—	3–1	—	2–0	2–1	—	—	—	—	4–0	—	—	1–0	—	2–0	1–1
Estudiantes Tecos	0–2	—	2–0	—	—	0–0	—	5–0	1–0	—	2–2	0–2	—	6–3	—	2–1
Excélsior	—	—	—	0–5	1–3	2–2	—	—	—	1–3	—	—	2–0	0–4	1–4	—
Indios UACJ	1–1	—	—	—	1–3	1–1	—	0–1	—	1–1	2–2	—	—	3–2	—	—
Loros UdeC	—	2–0	4–1	4–0	2–3	—	3–1	—	—	—	—	3–1	5–3	—	1–1	2–0
Dep. Los Altos	2–0	—	—	2–3	1–1	2–2	—	4–0	—	6–0	—	—	—	4–0	1–3	—
Murciélagos	5–1	—	2–1	—	—	3–0	—	3–0	1–1	—	2–2	—	—	1–1	—	1–0
Real Saltillo S.	—	1–1	2–3	2–6	—	—	5–2	—	0–2	—	1–0	0–3	—	—	—	—
Reynosa	—	1–1	—	1–1	2–2	2–1	—	—	—	4–2	—	—	2–2	—	4–1	3–1
U.A. Tamaulipas	—	1–0	1–1	2–3	—	—	1–0	—	0–0	—	—	1–1	4–3	—	—	—
Vaqueros	0–1	0–3	—	1–3	—	—	—	1–0	2–1	—	2–2	—	2–1	—	1–1	—

Source: Segunda División FMF
Legend: Blue = home team win; Yellow = draw; Red = away team win.

==== Group 2 ====
===== Standings =====
Pos	Team	Pld	W	D	L	GF	GA	GD	Pts	Qualification or relegation
1	C.F. Cuautitlán	15	8	3	4	26	15	+11	30	Promotion Playoffs
2	Potros UAEM	15	9	1	5	26	19	+7	29	Promotion Playoffs
3	Ballenas Galeana Morelos	15	7	4	4	22	18	+4	29	Promotion Playoffs
4	Atlas "B"	15	9	1	5	32	21	+11	28	Promotion Playoffs
5	Real Cuautitlán	15	7	5	3	25	21	+4	28	Promotion Playoffs
6	Unión de Curtidores	15	8	1	6	19	13	+6	27	Promotion Playoffs
7	Ocelotes UNACH	15	6	3	6	25	23	+2	22	Promotion Playoffs
8	Tampico Madero	15	5	5	5	25	28	−3	22	Promotion Playoffs
9	Patriotas de Córdoba	15	6	3	6	22	18	+4	21	
10	Cruz Azul Jasso	15	5	4	6	27	24	+3	21	
11	Querétaro "B"	15	6	2	7	16	22	−6	21	
12	Delfines del Carmen	15	5	5	5	15	13	+2	20	
13	Inter Playa del Carmen	15	5	3	7	18	23	−5	18	
14	Veracruz "B"	15	4	4	7	21	23	−2	17	
15	Albinegros de Orizaba	15	3	4	8	17	34	−17	14	
16	Promesas Altamira	15	1	4	10	9	30	−21	8	

Source: Segunda División FMF

===== Results =====
Home \ Away	ALB	ATL	BGM	CAJ	CUA	DEL	IPC	OUC	PAT	PUM	PRA	QUE	RCU	TAM	UDC	VER
Albinegros	—	—	0–1	3–3	1–1	—	—	3–1	—	—	3–0	1–2	—	—	0–3	1–1
Atlas	5–0	—	4–1	—	—	—	—	2–1	3–1	4–2	—	—	—	—	1–0	3–2
Ballenas Galeana	—	—	—	2–2	1–0	3–1	3–0	4–4	—	—	—	—	0–1	2–2	—	—
Cruz Azul Jasso	—	0–1	—	—	0–1	1–0	5–0	—	4–1	—	—	—	0–3	3–3	—	—
C.F. Cuautitlán	—	3–2	—	—	—	1–1	3–1	—	2–1	0–1	—	2–1	0–1	5–0	—	—
Delfines	2–0	0–1	—	—	—	—	3–0	—	1–0	0–0	—	3–0	—	0–2	—	—
Inter Playa	4–0	1–0	—	—	—	—	—	—	1–1	0–1	0–1	2–0	5–0	1–1	—	—
Ocelotes UNACH	—	—	—	1–0	3–1	1–1	4–1	—	2–1	—	—	—	4–4	2–1	—	—
Patriotas	5–1	2–1	2–0	—	—	—	—	—	—	1–0	4–1	—	—	—	0–0	3–1
Potros UAEM	4–0	—	0–2	3–0	—	—	—	2–1	—	—	1–0	—	—	—	1–4	4–3
Promesas Altamira	—	—	1–1	1–4	0–3	0–0	—	0–1	—	—	—	2–2	—	—	0–1	1–4
Querétaro	—	1–0	0–1	1–2	—	—	—	1–0	1–0	0–3	—	—	1–1	—	—	1–0
Real Cuautitlán	2–2	1–1	—	—	—	1–1	—	—	3–1	2–3	2–0	—	—	—	0–1	2–1
Tampico Madero	0–2	6–4	—	—	—	—	—	—	0–0	2–1	1–1	4–2	1–2	—	2–1	—
Unión de Curtidores	—	—	0–1	3–2	0–2	2–0	0–1	1–0	—	—	—	1–3	—	—	—	2–0
Veracruz	—	—	1–0	1–1	2–2	1–2	1–1	1–0	—	—	—	—	—	2–0	—	—

Source: Segunda División FMF
Legend: Blue = home team win; Yellow = draw; Red = away team win.

=== Regular season statistics ===
==== Top goalscorers ====
Players sorted first by goals scored, then by last name.

Rank	Player	Club	Goals
1	(Mexico) Martín Barragán	Atlas	15
2	(Mexico) Marcelo Aguas	Los Altos	14
3	(Mexico) Gustavo Félix	Loros UdeC	12
3	(Mexico) Juan Diego González	Cruz Azul Jasso	12
5	(Mexico) Jovanni Hurtado	Unión de Curtidores	11
5	(Mexico) Pablo Hütt	Reynosa	11
7	(Mexico) Éder Cruz	Murciélagos	10
7	(Mexico) César Macías	Loros UdeC	10
7	(Mexico) Mario Nieblas	Coras Tepic	10

=== Liguilla ===
The eight best teams of each group play two games against each other on a home-and-away basis. The higher seeded teams play on their home field during the second leg. The winner of each match up is determined by aggregate score. In the Round of 8, quarterfinals and semifinals, if the two teams are tied on aggregate the higher seeded team advances. In the final, if the two teams are tied after both legs, the match goes to extra time and, if necessary, a penalty shoot-out.

Round of 16
1	Coras Tepic	0	3	3
14	Reynosa	0	2	2
5	Potros UAEM	0	0	0
17	Ocelotes UNACH	2	0	2
2	Chivas Rayadas (s.)	2	1	3
13	Bravos	0	3	3
6	Ballenas Galeana	1	2	3
12	Unión de Curtidores	2	2	4
3	Murciélagos	0	3	3
11	Cachorros UdeG	2	0	2
8	Dorados UACH (s.)	1	2	3
9	Loros UdeC	3	0	3
4	Cuautitlán	0	5	5
18	Tampico Madero	1	0	1
7	Atlas	3	5	8
10	Real Cuautitlán	1	1	2

Quarter-finals
1	Coras Tepic (s.)	1	1	2
17	Ocelotes UNACH	1	1	2
2	Chivas Rayadas	0	1	1
12	Unión de Curtidores	1	1	2
3	Murciélagos	1	2	3
8	Dorados UACH	0	2	2
4	Cuautitlán	0	3	3
7	Atlas	1	1	2

Semi-finals
1	Coras Tepic	2	2	4
12	Unión de Curtidores	0	0	0
3	Murciélagos	2	3	5
4	Cuautitlán	3	0	3

Final
1	Coras Tepic	1	1	2
3	Murciélagos	1	2	3

==== Round of 8 ====
Team 1	Agg.	Team 2	1st leg	2nd leg
Coras Tepic	3–2	Reynosa	0–0	3–2
Potros UAEM	0–2	Ocelotes UNACH	0–2	0–0
Chivas Rayadas (s.)	3–3	Bravos	2–0	1–3
Ballenas Galeana	3–4	Unión de Curtidores	1–2	2–2
Murciélagos	3–2	Cachorros UdeG	0–2	3–0
Dorados UACH (s.)	3–3	Loros UdeC	1–3	2–0
Cuautitlán	5–1	Tampico Madero	0–1	5–0
Atlas	8–2	Real Cuautitlán	3–1	5–1

===== First leg =====
28 November 2012	Cachorros UdeG	2–0	Murciélagos	Guadalajara
12:00	Hurtado 32', 86'	Report		Stadium: Estadio Jalisco; Attendance: 200; Referee: Reinhold Enrique Ortiz Tienda

28 November 2012	Real Cuautitlán	1–3	Atlas	Cuautitlán
15:00	Gurrola 77'	Report	Sánchez 2' (own); Barragán 44'; Rodríguez 68'	Stadium: Estadio Los Pinos; Attendance: 500; Referee: Dennis Celerino Zaleta Cortez

28 November 2012	Ocelotes UNACH	2–0	Potros UAEM	Tapachula
15:00	Félix 24', 39'	Report		Stadium: Estadio Olímpico de Tapachula; Attendance: 1,200; Referee: Carlos Javier Ríos García

28 November 2012	Loros UdeC	3–1	Dorados UACH	Colima City
15:00	Amador 42'; Macías 58', 80'	Report		Stadium: Estadio Olímpico Universitario de Colima; Attendance: 500; Referee: Jesús Bisguerra Mendiola

28 November 2012	Bravos	0–2	Chivas Rayadas	Nuevo Laredo
19:00		Report	Cisneros 15'; Hernández 35'	Stadium: Unidad Deportiva Benito Juárez; Attendance: 700; Referee: Jesús Leopoldo Guerrero García

28 November 2012	Tampico Madero	1–0	Cuautitlán	Tampico and Ciudad Madero
19:00	Rodríguez 2'	Report		Stadium: Estadio Tamaulipas; Attendance: 4,000; Referee: José Juan Contreras García

28 November 2012	Reynosa	0–0	Coras Tepic	Reynosa
19:30		Report		Stadium: Estadio Adolfo López Mateos; Attendance: 500; Referee: Luis Darién Morán Dionías

29 November 2012	Unión de Curtidores	2–1	Ballenas Galeana	León
15:00	Moreno 30', 71'	Report	Giachero 43'	Stadium: Centro Deportivo Andrómeda; Attendance: 400; Referee: César Alfredo Venegas García

===== Second leg =====
1 December 2012	Potros UAEM	0–0 (0–2 agg.)	Ocelotes UNACH	Toluca
12:00		Report		Stadium: Estadio Universitario Alberto "Chivo" Córdoba; Attendance: 1,500; Referee: Christian Adrián Ramírez Tejeda

1 December 2012	Cuautitlán	5–0 (5–1 agg.)	Tampico Madero	Huixquilucan de Degollado
12:00	Burciaga 2'; Iturbide 31'; Zacarías 49'; Vázquez 85'; San Román 87'	Report		Stadium: Estadio Alberto Pérez Navarro; Attendance: 200; Referee: Adonai Escobedo González

1 December 2012	Chivas Rayadas	1–3 (3–3 agg.)	Bravos	Guadalajara
12:00	Marín 80'	Report	Reyes 57'; Saldaña 65'; Chávez 87'	Stadium: Estadio Jalisco; Attendance: 100; Referee: Marco Antonio Hernández Ramírez

1 December 2012	Atlas	5–1 (8–2 agg.)	Real Cuautitlán	Zapopan
16:00	Barragán 24', 52'; García de León 35', 90'; Díaz 70'	Report	Madrigal 33'	Stadium: Estadio Alfredo "Pistache" Torres; Attendance: 150; Referee: Humberto Sánchez Reyna

1 December 2012	Dorados UACH	2–0 (3–3 agg.)	Loros UdeC	Chihuahua City
18:00	Ledezma 47', 75'	Report		Stadium: Estadio Olímpico Universitario José Reyes Baeza; Attendance: 1,000; Referee: Mario Humberto Vargas Mata

1 December 2012	Murciélagos	3–0 (3–2 agg.)	Cachorros UdeG	Guamúchil
18:05	Cruz 33'; Villalpando 56'; García 62'	Report		Stadium: Coloso del Dique; Attendance: 4,000; Referee: Luis Miguel Tapia González

1 December 2012	Coras Tepic	3–2 (3–2 agg.)	Reynosa	Tepic
20:00	Nieblas 25'; Ledesma 27'; López 87'	Report	Hütt 9'; Tristán 64'	Stadium: Arena Cora; Attendance: 10,000; Referee: Jonathan Hernández Juárez

2 December 2012	Ballenas Galeana	2–2 (3–4 agg.)	Unión de Curtidores	Xochitepec
15:30	Bernal 67'; Bello 88'	Report	Medina 48', 77'	Stadium: Estadio Mariano Matamoros; Attendance: 300; Referee: Diego Montaño Robles

==== Quarter-finals ====
Team 1	Agg.	Team 2	1st leg	2nd leg
Coras Tepic (s.)	2–2	Ocelotes UNACH	1–1	1–1
Chivas Rayadas	1–2	Unión de Curtidores	0–1	1–1
Murciélagos	3–2	Dorados UACH	1–0	2–2
Cuautitlán	3–2	Atlas	0–1	3–1

===== First leg =====
5 December 2012	Ocelotes UNACH	1–1	Coras Tepic	Tapachula
15:00	Félix 2'	Report	Nieblas 56'	Stadium: Estadio Olímpico de Tapachula; Attendance: 3,000; Referee: Carlos Javier Ríos García

5 December 2012	Unión de Curtidores	1–0	Chivas Rayadas	León
15:00	Moreno 21'	Report		Stadium: Centro Deportivo Andrómeda; Attendance: 400; Referee: Reinhold Enrique Ortiz Tienda

5 December 2012	Atlas	1–0	Cuautitlán	Guadalajara
16:00	García de León 36'	Report		Stadium: Estadio Jalisco; Attendance: 100; Referee: Jesús Bisguerra Mendiola

5 December 2012	Dorados UACH	0–1	Murciélagos	Chihuahua City
19:00		Report	Tovar 4'	Stadium: Estadio Olímpico Universitario José Reyes Baeza; Attendance: 1,000; Referee: Hernán Ramírez Díaz

===== Second leg =====
8 December 2012	Chivas Rayadas	1–1 (1–2 agg.)	Unión de Curtidores	Guadalajara
12:00	Zamora 8'	Report	Marín 47' (own)	Stadium: Estadio Jalisco; Attendance: 200; Referee: Jonathan Hernández Juárez

8 December 2012	Cuautitlán	3–1 (3–2 agg.)	Atlas	Pachuca
15:30	Burciaga 15'; Valdez 45'; San Román 57'	Report	Santoyo 86'	Stadium: Estadio Hidalgo; Attendance: 200; Referee: Adonai Escobedo González

8 December 2012	Murciélagos	2–2 (3–2 agg.)	Dorados UACH	Guamúchil
18:05	Cruz 53'; García 88'	Report	Loya 10'; Holguín 90'	Stadium: Coloso del Dique; Attendance: 3,000; Referee: Diego Montaño Robles

8 December 2012	Coras Tepic	1–1 (2–2 agg.)	Ocelotes UNACH	Tepic
20:00	Ledesma 62'	Report	Alba 90+1'	Stadium: Arena Cora; Attendance: 11,000; Referee: Marco Antonio Hernández Ramírez

==== Semi-finals ====
Team 1	Agg.	Team 2	1st leg	2nd leg
Coras Tepic	4–0	Unión de Curtidores	2–0	2–0
Murciélagos	5–3	Cuautitlán	2–3	3–0

===== First leg =====
12 December 2012	Unión de Curtidores	0–2	Coras Tepic	León
15:30		Report	Aguilar 35'; Nieblas 57'	Stadium: Estadio La Martinica; Attendance: 800; Referee: Jonathan Hernández Juárez

12 December 2012	Cuautitlán	3–2	Murciélagos	Pachuca
18:00	Burciaga 8'; Iturbide 34'; Romero 71'	Report	Rodríguez 7'; Villalpando 56'	Stadium: Estadio Hidalgo; Attendance: 500; Referee: Jesús Bisguerra Mendiola

===== Second leg =====
15 December 2012	Murciélagos	3–0 (5–3 agg.)	Cuautitlán	Guamúchil
18:15	Tovar 6', 25'; Cruz 29'	Report		Stadium: Coloso del Dique; Attendance: 4,000; Referee: Diego Montaño Robles

15 December 2012	Coras Tepic	2–0 (4–0 agg.)	Unión de Curtidores	Tepic
20:00	Salazar 22'; Nieblas 70'	Report		Stadium: Arena Cora; Attendance: 11,000

==== Final ====
Team 1	Agg.	Team 2	1st leg	2nd leg
Coras Tepic	2–3	Murciélagos	1–1	1–2

===== First leg =====
19 December 2012	Murciélagos	1–1	Coras Tepic	Guamúchil
20:05	Agressot 11'	Report	Nieblas 74'	Stadium: Coloso del Dique; Attendance: 5,000; Referee: Jonathan Hernández Juárez

===== Second leg =====
22 December 2012	Coras Tepic	1–2 (2–3 agg.)	Murciélagos	Tepic
20:00	Cruz 52'	Report	Rodríguez 59'; Rojas 87'	Stadium: Arena Cora; Attendance: 12,500; Referee: Adonai Escobedo González

Apertura 2012 winners:

1st title

== Torneo Clausura ==
=== Regular season ===
==== Group 1 ====
===== Standings =====
Pos	Team	Pld	W	D	L	GF	GA	GD	Pts	Qualification or relegation
1	Chivas Rayadas	15	12	1	2	27	9	+18	37	Promotion Playoffs
2	Coras Tepic	15	10	3	2	35	14	+21	35	Promotion Playoffs
3	Deportivo de Los Altos	15	8	2	5	28	22	+6	28	Promotion Playoffs
4	Loros UdeC	15	7	3	5	23	20	+3	27	Promotion Playoffs
5	Murciélagos	15	6	5	4	21	19	+2	25	Promotion Playoffs
6	Dorados Fuerza UACH	15	6	3	6	23	20	+3	22	Promotion Playoffs
7	Reynosa	15	6	4	5	21	20	+1	22	Promotion Playoffs
8	Vaqueros	15	6	3	6	17	23	−6	22	Promotion Playoffs
9	Estudiantes Tecos "B"	15	5	4	6	20	25	−5	21	
10	Real Saltillo Soccer	15	6	1	8	27	31	−4	20	
11	Indios UACJ	15	5	4	6	17	15	+2	19	
12	Excélsior	15	6	1	8	21	24	−3	19	Relegated to Liga de Nuevos Talentos
13	Bravos de Nuevo Laredo	15	4	5	6	16	21	−5	18	
14	Águilas Reales de Zacatecas	15	4	4	7	14	21	−7	17	
15	Cachorros UdeG	15	2	3	10	15	31	−16	11	
16	U.A. Tamaulipas	15	2	4	9	9	19	−10	10	

Source: Segunda División FMF

===== Results =====
Home \ Away	ARZ	BRA	CUG	CHI	COR	DFU	EST	EXC	IUJ	LUC	ALT	MUR	RSS	REY	UAT	VAQ
Águilas Reales	—	1–1	3–3	1–0	—	—	0–1	—	0–0	—	3–0	2–0	—	—	—	1–3
Bravos	—	—	—	—	2–2	1–3	—	—	—	1–0	—	—	1–0	1–2	2–1	1–2
Cachorros UdeG	—	2–1	—	0–1	—	—	1–1	—	—	1–2	—	1–4	1–2	—	3–2	—
Chivas Rayadas	—	4–0	—	—	2–1	1–0	—	2–3	—	0–0	—	—	3–0	2–1	1–0	3–0
Coras Tepic	5–1	—	1–0	—	—	0–0	—	4–2	3–2	3–0	3–1	—	—	3–1	—	—
Dorados UACH	2–0	—	2–0	—	—	—	—	3–1	0–0	—	1–2	2–1	—	2–3	—	—
Estudiantes Tecos	—	1–1	—	0–1	0–4	2–2	—	—	—	1–3	—	—	4–0	—	1–0	—
Excélsior	0–0	2–1	0–2	—	—	—	1–2	—	1–0	—	4–1	0–1	—	—	—	2–0
Indios UACJ	—	0–0	2–2	0–1	—	—	3–1	—	—	—	—	0–0	2–0	—	1–0	1–2
Loros UdeC	2–0	—	—	—	—	2–1	—	2–0	2–1	—	1–3	—	—	2–2	—	—
Dep. Los Altos	—	3–1	1–0	1–2	—	—	3–0		3–1	—	—	2–2	6–0	—	—	2–0
Murciélagos	—	0–0	—	2–3	1–0	—	3–1	—	—	1–0	—	—	3–2	—	0–0	—
Real Saltillo S.	3–1	—	—	—	2–3	2–3	—	3–1	—	4–4	—	—	—	4–0	3–0	2–0
Reynosa	1–0	—	2–1	—	—	—	1–1	3–1	0–1	—	4–0	1–1	—	—	—	—
U.A. Tamaulipas	0–1	—	—	—	0–3	3–1	—	2–0	—	0–2	0–0	—	—	0–0	—	1–1
Vaqueros	—	—	0–2	—	0–0	2–1	2–4	—	—	2–1	—	2–2	—	1–0	—	—

Source: Segunda División FMF
Legend: Blue = home team win; Yellow = draw; Red = away team win.

==== Group 2 ====
===== Standings =====
Pos	Team	Pld	W	D	L	GF	GA	GD	Pts	Qualification or relegation
1	Ballenas Galeana Morelos	15	10	4	1	41	17	+24	36	Promotion Playoffs
2	Delfines del Carmen	15	10	3	2	32	21	+11	35	Promotion Playoffs
3	Potros UAEM	15	8	4	3	29	17	+12	32	Promotion Playoffs
4	Unión de Curtidores	15	10	1	4	24	13	+11	32	Promotion Playoffs
5	Patriotas de Córdoba	15	7	5	3	25	16	+9	27	Promotion Playoffs
6	C.F. Cuautitlán	15	7	3	5	26	23	+3	26	Promotion Playoffs
7	Ocelotes UNACH	15	7	2	6	20	20	0	23	Promotion Playoffs
8	Atlas "B"	15	6	2	7	22	24	−2	22	Promotion Playoffs
9	Albinegros de Orizaba	15	5	5	5	22	26	−4	21	
10	Cruz Azul Jasso	15	4	6	5	16	13	+3	18	
11	Real Cuautitlán	15	4	3	8	21	25	−4	16	
12	Veracruz "B"	15	4	3	8	25	30	−5	16	
13	Promesas Altamira	15	5	1	9	20	33	−13	16	Relegated to Liga de Nuevos Talentos
14	Querétaro "B"	15	3	4	8	18	35	−17	13	
15	Inter Playa del Carmen	15	2	5	8	12	17	−5	11	
16	Tampico Madero	15	1	3	11	15	38	−23	6	

Source: Segunda División FMF

===== Results =====
Home \ Away	ALB	ATL	BGM	CAJ	CUA	DEL	IPC	OUC	PAT	PUM	PRA	QUE	RCU	TAM	UDC	VER
Albinegros	—	0–2	—	—	—	2–2	2–1	—	3–3	0–1	—	—	2–2	3–1	—	—
Atlas	—	—	—	1–2	1–2	1–3	1–0	—	2–0	—	—	1–1	2–1	4–1	—	—
Ballenas Galeana	4–0	4–1	—	—	—	—	—	—	3–3	5–1	4–0	4–1	—	—	4–2	2–0
Cruz Azul Jasso	1–2	—	0–1	—	—	—	—	2–1	—	1–1	1–1	1–1	—	—	0–0	5–0
C.F. Cuautitlán	1–2	—	2–2	1–0	—	—	—	4–3	—	—	3–0	—	—	—	0–1	4–1
Delfines	—	—	3–3	1–0	5–1	—	—	0–1	—	—	2–0	—	2–1	—	1–0	4–3
Inter Playa	—	—	0–0	0–0	1–2	0–0	—	4–1	—	—	—	—	—	—	1–2	2–1
Ocelotes UNACH	2–1	2–0	1–0	—	—	—	—	—	—	0–2	4–1	2–1	—	—	1–0	1–2
Patriotas	—	—	—	0–0	1–1	3–0	1–0	0–0	—	—	—	4–1	3–1	2–0	—	—
Potros UAEM	—	2–2	—	—	2–2	0–1	3–1	—	2–1	—	—	4–0	3–1	4–1	—	—
Promesas Altamira	1–2	4–2	—	—	—	—	1–0	—	0–1	0–3	—	—	4–0	4–0	—	—
Querétaro	2–2	—	—	—	1–0	3–4	2–1	—	—	—	1–3	—	—	1–1	1–0	—
Real Cuautitlán	—	—	1–2	0–1	2–1	—	0–0	2–0	—	—	—	5–1	—	2–0	—	—
Tampico Madero	—	—	2–3	3–2	0–2	3–4	1–1	1–1	—	—	—	—	—	—	—	1–2
Unión de Curtidores	2–0	2–0	—	—	—	—	—	—	3–2	1–0	2–0	—	2–1	3–0	—	—
Veracruz	1–1	0–2	—	—	—	—	—	—	0–1	1–1	7–1	3–0	2–2	—	2–3	—

Source: Segunda División FMF
Legend: Blue = home team win; Yellow = draw; Red = away team win.

=== Regular season statistics ===
==== Top goalscorers ====
Players sorted first by goals scored, then by last name.

Rank	Player	Club	Goals
1	(Mexico) Jesús Rodríguez	Patriotas de Córdoba	13
2	(Mexico) Juan Carlos Martínez	Chivas Rayadas	11
3	(Mexico) Mario Nieblas	Coras Tepic	10
4	(Mexico) Américo Rodríguez	Real Saltillo Soccer	9
4	(Mexico) Ignacio Soto	Albinegros de Orizaba	9
4	(Mexico) Víctor Zamora	Querétaro	9
7	(Mexico) Francisco Iturbide	Cuautitlán	8
7	(Mexico) José López	Delfines del Carmen	8
7	(Mexico) Dante Osorio	Potros UAEM	8
7	(Mexico) Emmanuel Tapia	Delfines del Carmen	8

=== Liguilla ===
The eight best teams of each group play two games against each other on a home-and-away basis. The higher seeded teams play on their home field during the second leg. The winner of each match up is determined by aggregate score. In the Round of 8, quarterfinals and semifinals, if the two teams are tied on aggregate the higher seeded team advances. In the final, if the two teams are tied after both legs, the match goes to extra time and, if necessary, a penalty shoot-out.

Round of 8
2	Ballenas Galeana	1	2	3
15	Atlas	1	0	1
9	Loros UdeC	2	1	3
11	Murciélagos	1	1	2
3	Coras Tepic	0	2	2
14	Reynosa	1	0	1
7	Deportivo Los Altos	0	4	4
13	Dorados UACH	2	0	4
1	Chivas Rayadas (s.)	1	0	1
16	Vaqueros	1	0	1
4	Delfines del Carmen	2	1	3
12	Ocelotes UNACH	2	2	4
5	Potros UAEM	2	3	5
10	Cuautitlán	1	1	2
6	Unión de Curtidores	0	3	3
8	Patriotas de Córdoba	1	0	1

Quarter-finals
2	Ballenas Galeana	1	7	8
9	Loros UdeC	2	2	4
3	Coras Tepic (s.)	1	0	1
7	Deportivo Los Altos	1	0	1
1	Chivas Rayadas	1	2	3
12	Ocelotes UNACH	1	1	2
5	Potros UAEM	3	0	3
6	Unión de Curtidores	1	3	4

Semi-finals
2	Ballenas Galeana (s.)	1	0	1
3	Coras Tepic	1	0	1
1	Chivas Rayadas	0	0	0
6	Unión de Curtidores	3	2	5

Final
2	Ballenas Galeana (pen.)	1	0	1(5)
6	Unión de Curtidores	0	1	1(4)

==== Round of 8 ====
Team 1	Agg.	Team 2	1st leg	2nd leg
Ballenas Galeana	3–1	Atlas	1–1	2–0
Loros UdeC	3–2	Murciélagos	–	–
Coras Tepic	2–1	Reynosa	0–1	2–0
Deportivo Los Altos	4–2	Dorados UACH	0–2	4–0
Chivas Rayadas (s.)	1–1	Vaqueros	1–1	0–0
Delfines del Carmen	3–4	Ocelotes UNACH	2–2	1–2
Potros UAEM	5–2	Cuautitlán	2–1	3–1
Unión de Curtidores	3–1	Patriotas de Córdoba	0–1	3–0

===== First leg =====
1 May 2013	Atlas	1–1	Ballenas Galeana	Zapopan
12:00	Sánchez 20'	Report	Estrada 31'	Stadium: Estadio Alfredo "Pistache" Torres; Attendance: 700; Referee: Humberto Sánchez Reyna

1 May 2013	Cuautitlán	1–2	Potros UAEM	Huixquilucan de Degollado
12:00	Iturbide 53'	Report	García 72'; Martínez 74'	Stadium: Estadio Alberto Pérez Navarro; Attendance: 300; Referee: Diego Montaño Robles

1 May 2013	Reynosa	1–0	Coras Tepic	Reynosa
16:00	Rodríguez 35'	Report		Stadium: Unidad Deportiva Solidaridad; Attendance: 500; Referee: Mario Humberto Vargas Mata

1 May 2013	Ocelotes UNACH	2–2	Delfines del Carmen	Tapachula
16:00	Treviño 65'; Félix 74'	Report	Tapia 47'; Valverde 84'	Stadium: Estadio Olímpico de Tapachula; Attendance: 2,500; Referee: Gonzalo Santiago García

1 May 2013	Vaqueros	1–1	Chivas Rayadas	Ameca
17:00	Estudillo 66'	Report	Villanueva 55'	Stadium: Núcleo Deportivo y de Espectáculos Ameca; Attendance: 200; Referee: Reinhold Enrique Ortíz Tienda

1 May 2013	Patriotas de Córdoba	1–0	Unión de Curtidores	Córdoba
17:00	Chávez 58'	Report		Stadium: Estadio Rafael Murillo Vidal; Attendance: 1,500; Referee: Mario Andrés Eliosa Torres

1 May 2013	Dorados UACH	2–0	Deportivo Los Altos	Chihuahua City
19:00	Macías 5'; Aguiñaga 84'	Report		Stadium: Estadio Olímpico Universitario José Reyes Baeza; Attendance: 1,000; Referee: Alejandro Funk Villafañe

1 May 2013	Murciélagos	1–2	Loros UdeC	Guamúchil
20:05	Santillán 51'	Report	Aguirre 86'; Michel 90+3'	Stadium: Coloso del Dique; Attendance: 3,500; Referee: Jesús Bisguerra Mendiola

===== Second leg =====
4 May 2013	Chivas Rayadas	0–0 (1–1 agg.)	Vaqueros	Zapopan
11:00		Report		Stadium: Estadio Omnilife; Attendance: 200; Referee: Edgar Allan Morales Olvera

4 May 2013	Ballenas Galeana	2–0 (3–1 agg.)	Atlas	Xochitepec
16:00	López 58', 68'	Report		Stadium: Estadio Mariano Matamoros; Attendance: 500; Referee: Ángel Flores Galicia

4 May 2013	Loros UdeC	1–1 (3–2 agg.)	Murciélagos	Colima City
16:00	Amador 39'	Report	Fernández 85'	Stadium: Estadio Olímpico Universitario de Colima; Attendance: 5,000; Referee: Adonai Escobedo González

4 May 2013	Unión de Curtidores	3–0 (3–1 agg.)	Patriotas de Córdoba	Irapuato
17:00	Maldonado 9'; Moreno 34', 44'	Report		Stadium: Estadio Sergio León Chávez; Attendance: 1,000; Referee: Jonathan Hernández Juárez

4 May 2013	Deportivo Los Altos	4–0 (4–2 agg.)	Dorados UACH	Yahualica
18:00	Vallejo 24'; Urzua 41'; Aguas 72'; Ruíz 83'	Report		Stadium: Estadio Las Ánimas; Attendance: 800; Referee: Edgardo Espejo Tello

4 May 2013	Delfines del Carmen	1–2 (3–4 agg.)	Ocelotes UNACH	Ciudad del Carmen
20:00	Valverde 76'	Report	Calderón 8', 66'	Stadium: Unidad Deportiva Campus II UAC; Attendance: 5,000; Referee: Gilberto Alvarado Farjat

4 May 2013	Potros UAEM	3–1 (5–2 agg.)	Cuautitlán	Toluca
20:00	González 12'; Tello 25'; Sahagún 85'	Report	San Román 81'	Stadium: Estadio Universitario Alberto "Chivo" Córdoba; Attendance: 500; Referee: Antonio de Jesús Olalde Vázquez

4 May 2013	Coras Tepic	2–0 (2–1 agg.)	Reynosa	Tepic
20:00	Villa 32'; Nieblas 86'	Report		Stadium: Arena Cora; Attendance: 7,000; Referee: Christian Adrián Ramírez Tejeda

==== Quarter-finals ====
Team 1	Agg.	Team 2	1st leg	2nd leg
Ballenas Galeana	8–4	Loros UdeC	1–2	7–2
Coras Tepic (s.)	1–1	Deportivo Los Altos	1–1	0–0
Chivas Rayadas	3–2	Ocelotes UNACH	1–1	2–1
Potros UAEM	3–4	Unión de Curtidores	3–1	0–3

===== First leg =====
8 May 2013	Loros UdeC	2–1	Ballenas Galeana	Colima City
16:00	Zúñiga 2'; Michel 49'	Report	Burgoa 51'	Stadium: Estadio Olímpico Universitario de Colima; Attendance: 1,000; Referee: Antonio de Jesús Olalde Vázquez

8 May 2013	Ocelotes UNACH	1–1	Chivas Rayadas	Tapachula
16:00	Calderón 80'	Report	Martínez 44'	Stadium: Estadio Olímpico de Tapachula; Attendance: 5,000; Referee: Carlos Javier Ríos García

8 May 2013	Deportivo Los Altos	1–1	Coras Tepic	Yahualica
18:00	Partida 18'	Report	Villa 46'	Stadium: Estadio Las Ánimas; Attendance: 600; Referee: Edgar Allan Morales Olvera

8 May 2013	Unión de Curtidores	1–3	Potros UAEM	Irapuato
20:15	Hernández 43'	Report	Arriaga 67'; Osorio 75'; González 80'	Stadium: Estadio Sergio León Chávez; Attendance: 500; Referee: Christian Adrián Ramírez Tejeda

===== Second leg =====
11 May 2013	Chivas Rayadas	2–1 (3–2 agg.)	Ocelotes UNACH	Zapopan
11:00	Martínez 47', 79'	Report	Ramón 48'	Stadium: Estadio Omnilife; Attendance: 150; Referee: Jonathan Hernández Juárez

11 May 2013	Ballenas Galeana	7–2 (8–4 agg.)	Loros UdeC	Xochitepec
16:00	Sánchez 15', 50'; López 44'; Monzonis 49', 60', 66'; Pineda 59'		Michel 30', 75'	Stadium: Estadio Mariano Matamoros; Attendance: 800; Referee: Jesús Bisguerra Mendiola

11 May 2013	Potros UAEM	0–3 (3–4 agg.)	Unión de Curtidores	Toluca
20:00		Report	Rojas 44'; Gómez 54'; Moreno 62'	Stadium: Estadio Universitario Alberto "Chivo" Córdoba; Attendance: 1,000; Referee: Diego Montaño Robles

11 May 2013	Coras Tepic	0–0 (1–1 agg.)	Deportivo Los Altos	Tepic
20:00		Report		Stadium: Arena Cora; Attendance: 7,000; Referee: Adonai Escobedo González

==== Semi-finals ====
Team 1	Agg.	Team 2	1st leg	2nd leg
Ballenas Galeana (s.)	1–1	Coras Tepic	1–1	0–0
Chivas Rayadas	0–5	Unión de Curtidores	0–3	0–2

===== First leg =====
15 May 2013	Unión de Curtidores	3–0	Chivas Rayadas	Irapuato
17:00	Tovar 68'; Maldonado 83'; Moreno 89'	Report		Stadium: Estadio Sergio León Chávez; Attendance: 500; Referee: Adonai Escobedo González

15 May 2013	Coras Tepic	1–1	Ballenas Galeana	Tepic
20:30	Martínez 12' (own)	Report	López 56'	Stadium: Arena Cora; Attendance: 10,000; Referee: Diego Montaño Robles

===== Second leg =====
18 May 2013	Chivas Rayadas	0–2 (0–5 agg.)	Unión de Curtidores	Zapopan
11:00		Report	Pineda 13'; Maldonado 41'	Stadium: Estadio Omnilife; Attendance: 300; Referee: Jonathan Hernández Juárez

18 May 2013	Ballenas Galeana	0–0 (1–1 agg.)	Coras Tepic	Xochitepec
16:00		Report		Stadium: Estadio Mariano Matamoros; Attendance: 2,000; Referee: Jesús Bisguerra Mendiola

==== Final ====
Team 1	Agg.	Team 2	1st leg	2nd leg
Ballenas Galeana (pen.)	1–1 (5–4)	Unión de Curtidores	1–0	0–1

===== First leg =====
22 May 2013	Unión de Curtidores	0–1	Ballenas Galeana	Irapuato
17:00		Report	Catalán 47'	Stadium: Estadio Sergio León Chávez; Attendance: 2,000; Referee: Diego Montaño Robles

===== Second leg =====
25 May 2013	Ballenas Galeana	0–1 (1–1 agg.) (5–4 p)	Unión de Curtidores	Xochitepec
16:00		Report	Moreno 51'	Stadium: Estadio Mariano Matamoros; Attendance: 8,000; Referee: Adonai Escobedo González

Clausura 2013 winners:

1st title

== Relegation Table ==
P	Team	Pts	G	Pts/G
1	Coras Tepic	72	30	2.400
2	Chivas Rayadas	71	30	2.367
3	Ballenas Galeana	65	30	2.167
4	Potros UAEM	61	30	2.033
5	Unión de Curtidores	59	30	1.967
6	Cuautitlán	56	30	1.867
7	Delfines del Carmen	55	30	1.833
8	Loros UdeC	55	30	1.833
9	Murciélagos	55	30	1.833
10	Deportivo Los Altos	50	30	1.667
11	Dorados UACH	50	30	1.667
12	Atlas	50	30	1.667
13	Patriotas de Córdoba	48	30	1.600
14	Ocelotes UNACH	45	30	1.500
15	Reynosa	45	30	1.500
16	Real Cuautitlán	44	30	1.467
17	Bravos de Nuevo Laredo	41	30	1.367
18	Cruz Azul Jasso	39	30	1.300
19	Estudiantes Tecos "B"	38	30	1.267
20	Cachorros UdeG	38	30	1.267
21	Águilas Reales	36	30	1.200
22	Vaqueros	35	30	1.167
23	Albinegros de Orizaba	35	30	1.167
24	Querétaro	34	30	1.133
25	Indios UACJ	33	30	1.100
26	Veracruz B	33	30	1.100
27	U.A. Tamaulipas	33	30	1.100
28	Real Saltillo Soccer	29	30	0.967
29	Inter Playa del Carmen	29	30	0.967
30	Tampico Madero	28	30	0.933
31	Excélsior	26	30	0.867
32	Promesas Altamira	24	30	0.800

Last updated: 27 April 2013
Source: Liga Premier FMF
P = Position; G = Games played; Pts = Points; Pts/G = Ratio of points to games played

== Promotion Final ==
The Promotion Final is a series of matches played by the champions of the tournaments Apertura and Clausura, the game is played to determine the winning team of the promotion to Ascenso MX. The first leg was played on 29 May 2013, and the second leg was played on 1 June 2013.

Team 1	Agg.	Team 2	1st leg	2nd leg
Ballenas Galeana	5–3	Murciélagos	2–2	3–1

=== First leg ===
29 May 2013	Murciélagos	2–2	Ballenas Galeana	Guamúchil
20:30	Villalpando 2'; Rodríguez 28'	Report	Estrada 24'; Robledo 43'	Stadium: Coloso del Dique; Attendance: 4,500; Referee: Jesús Bisguerra Mendiola

=== Second leg ===
1 June 2013	Ballenas Galeana	3–1 (5–3 agg.)	Murciélagos	Xochitepec
16:00	Robledo 29'; Estrada 45'; Burgoa 73'	Report	Cruz 83'	Stadium: Estadio Mariano Matamoros; Attendance: 15,000; Referee: Adonai Escobedo González

2012–13 season winners:

1st title

== See also ==
- 2012–13 Liga MX season
- 2012–13 Ascenso MX season
- 2012–13 Liga de Nuevos Talentos season
