= 2013–14 Liga Premier de Ascenso season =

Liga Premier de Ascenso
- Season: 2013–14
- Dates: 9 August 2013 – 17 May 2014
- Champions: Apertura: Linces de Tlaxcala; Clausura; Atlético Coatzacoalcos
- Promoted: Coras de Tepic
- Relegated: U.A. Tamaulipas; Patriotas de Córdoba
- Top goalscorer: Apertura: Jorge Amador (15 goals); Clausura; Juan Carlos Martínez (13 goals)
- Biggest home win: Apertura: Teca UTN 6–0 Tuzos UAZ (23 August 2013); Clausura; Indios UACJ 7–0 Vaqueros (19 April 2014)
- Biggest away win: Apertura: Vaqueros 1–5 Loros UdeC (18 October 2013); Clausura; Atlético Veracruz 0–4 Ocelotes UNACH (19 April 2014)
- Highest scoring: Apertura: Loros UdeC (35 points); Clausura; Loros UdeC (39 points)
- Stats are from the regular season only

The 2013–14 Liga Premier de Ascenso season was split in two tournaments Apertura and Clausura. Liga Premier was the third-tier football league of Mexico. The season was played between 9 August 2013 and 17 May 2014.

== Torneo Apertura ==
=== Changes from the previous season ===
31 teams participated in this tournament.

- Chivas Rayadas was relocated to Tlaxcala and renamed Linces de Tlaxcala.
- Querétaro "B" was relocated to Irapuato.
- Cimarrones de Sonora was created after the promotion and relocation of Poblado Miguel Alemán F.C. to Hermosillo.
- Pumas Morelos, team relegated from Ascenso MX, was moved to Coatzacoalcos and renamed Atlético Coatzacoalcos.
- Tecamachalco moved from Cuautitlán to Ciudad Nezahualcóyotl and renamed Teca UTN.
- Real Saltillo Soccer was acquired by new owners, who relocated it to Zacatecas and renamed as Tuzos UAZ.

==== Group 1 ====
Location of teams in the 2013–14 LPA Group 1

| Club | City | Stadium | Capacity |
|---|---|---|---|
| Águilas Reales | Zacatecas City, Zacatecas | Francisco Villa | 14,000 |
| Bravos | Nuevo Laredo, Tamaulipas | Unidad Deportiva Benito Juárez | 5,000 |
| Cachorros UdeG | Guadalajara, Jalisco | Jalisco | 55,020 |
| Cimarrones | Hermosillo, Sonora | Héctor Espino | 15,000 |
| Coras de Tepic | Tepic, Nayarit | Olímpico Santa Teresita | 4,000 |
| Dorados Fuerza UACH | Chihuahua City, Chihuahua | Olímpico Universitario José Reyes Baeza | 22,000 |
| Durango | Durango City, Durango | Francisco Zarco | 18,000 |
| Estudiantes Tecos | Zapopan, Jalisco | Tres de Marzo | 18,750 |
| Indios UACJ | Ciudad Juárez, Chihuahua | Olímpico Benito Juárez | 19,703 |
| Loros UdeC | Colima City, Colima | Estadio Olímpico Universitario de Colima | 11,812 |
| Los Altos | Yahualica, Jalisco | Las Ánimas | 8,500 |
| Murciélagos | Guamúchil, Sinaloa | Coloso del Dique | 5,000 |
| Reynosa | Reynosa, Tamaulipas | Unidad Deportiva Solidaridad | 20,000 |
| Unión de Curtidores | León, Guanajuato | León | 31,297 |
| U.A. Tamaulipas | Ciudad Victoria, Tamaulipas | Eugenio Alvizo Porras | 5,000 |
| Vaqueros | Ameca, Jalisco | Núcleo Deportivo y de Espectáculos Ameca | 4,000 |

==== Group 2 ====
Location of teams in the 2013–14 LPA Group 2

| Club | City | Stadium | Capacity |
|---|---|---|---|
| Albinegros de Orizaba | Orizaba, Veracruz | Socum | 7,000 |
| Atlético Coatzacoalcos | Coatzacoalcos, Veracruz | Rafael Hernández Ochoa | 4,800 |
| Atlético Veracruz | Veracruz, Veracruz | Luis "Pirata" Fuente | 28,703 |
| Cruz Azul Jasso | Jasso, Hidalgo | 10 de Diciembre | 7,761 |
| Delfines "B" | Ciudad del Carmen, Campeche | UNACAR Campus II | 8,985 |
| Inter Playa | Playa del Carmen, Quintana Roo | Unidad Deportiva Mario Villanueva Madrid | 7,500 |
| Irapuato | Irapuato, Guanajuato | Sergio León Chávez | 25,000 |
| Linces | Tlaxcala City, Tlaxcala | Tlahuicole | 7,000 |
| Ocelotes UNACH | Tapachula, Chiapas | Olímpico de Tapachula | 11,000 |
| Patriotas | Córdoba, Veracruz | Rafael Murillo Vidal | 3,800 |
| Potros UAEM | Toluca, State of Mexico | Alberto "Chivo" Córdoba | 32,603 |
| Real Cuautitlán | Cuautitlán, State of Mexico | Los Pinos | 5,000 |
| Tampico Madero | Tampico Madero, Tamaulipas | Tamaulipas | 19,667 |
| Teca UTN | Ciudad Nezahualcóyotl, State of Mexico | Neza 86 | 20,000 |
| Tuzos UAZ | Zacatecas City, Zacatecas | Francisco Villa | 14,000 |

=== Regular season ===
==== Group 1 ====
===== Standings =====
| Pos | Team | Pld | W | D | L | GF | GA | GD | Pts | Qualification |
|---|---|---|---|---|---|---|---|---|---|---|
| 1 | Loros UdeC | 15 | 11 | 1 | 3 | 24 | 19 | +5 | 35 | Advance to Liguilla de Liga |
| 2 | Murciélagos | 15 | 7 | 5 | 3 | 24 | 13 | +11 | 29 | Advance to Liguilla de Liga |
| 3 | Coras de Tepic | 15 | 8 | 4 | 3 | 27 | 15 | +12 | 28 | Advance to Liguilla de Liga |
| 4 | Unión de Curtidores | 15 | 7 | 5 | 3 | 19 | 14 | +5 | 26 | Advance to Liguilla de Liga |
| 5 | Águilas Reales | 15 | 7 | 4 | 4 | 22 | 17 | +5 | 25 | Advance to Liguilla de Copa |
| 6 | Los Altos | 15 | 5 | 6 | 4 | 24 | 18 | +6 | 24 | Advance to Liguilla de Copa |
| 7 | Dorados Fuerza UACH | 15 | 7 | 2 | 6 | 22 | 18 | +4 | 24 | Advance to Liguilla de Copa |
| 8 | Durango | 15 | 6 | 3 | 6 | 27 | 22 | +5 | 22 | Advance to Liguilla de Copa |
| 9 | Indios UACJ | 15 | 6 | 3 | 6 | 21 | 19 | +2 | 22 | |
| 10 | Cimarrones | 15 | 5 | 5 | 5 | 16 | 21 | −5 | 21 | |
| 11 | Vaqueros | 15 | 4 | 6 | 5 | 20 | 23 | −3 | 19 | |
| 12 | Bravos | 15 | 4 | 4 | 7 | 16 | 24 | −8 | 18 | |
| 13 | Reynosa | 15 | 4 | 3 | 8 | 18 | 32 | −14 | 16 | |
| 14 | Estudiantes Tecos | 15 | 2 | 9 | 4 | 17 | 21 | −4 | 15 | |
| 15 | Cachorros UdeG | 15 | 3 | 4 | 8 | 15 | 24 | −9 | 13 | |
| 16 | U.A. Tamaulipas | 15 | 1 | 2 | 12 | 6 | 35 | −29 | 5 | |

Last updated on November 16, 2013.
Source: SoccerWay

===== Results =====
| Home \ Away | AGR | BRA | CUG | CIM | COR | DFU | DUR | EST | IUJ | LUC | LAS | MUR | REY | UDC | UAT | VAQ |
|---|---|---|---|---|---|---|---|---|---|---|---|---|---|---|---|---|
| Águilas Reales | | 1–0 | 2–1 | 0–0 | | 2–1 | | 2–1 | | | | | 5–0 | | 3–0 | 1–1 |
| Bravos | | | 1–1 | 1–2 | | | | 1–1 | 3–0 | | 1–0 | | 1–1 | | | 0–2 |
| Cachorros UdeG | | | | 0–1 | | | | 1–1 | 0–1 | | 1–1 | 2–1 | 3–0 | | | 0–1 |
| Cimarrones | | | | | 1–1 | 1–1 | 0–2 | | 0–2 | | 1–1 | 1–1 | | 2–1 | | |
| Coras | 5–1 | 3–0 | 2–1 | | | 1–0 | | 2–1 | | | | | 1–0 | | 4–0 | 0–0 |
| Dorados UACH | | 1–0 | 2–0 | | | | | | 1–0 | 1–2 | 2–1 | 0–1 | 3–0 | | 2–1 | |
| Durango | 0–1 | 3–3 | 6–1 | | 1–1 | 3–5 | | 2–0 | | | | | 4–0 | | 3–0 | |
| Est. Tecos | | | | 3–2 | | 1–1 | | | 0–0 | 3–2 | 0–2 | 0–0 | | 1–1 | | 1–1 |
| Indios UACJ | 1–0 | | | | 1–2 | | 2–3 | | | 3–1 | | 3–1 | | 0–0 | 4–0 | |
| Loros UdeC | 3–0 | 5–0 | 4–2 | 5–1 | 4–3 | | 3–0 | | | | | | | 1–1 | 2–0 | |
| Los Altos | 1–1 | | | | 2–2 | | 0–0 | | 2–0 | 2–1 | | 1–1 | | 3–4 | | |
| Murciélagos | 2–2 | 3–1 | | | 2–0 | | 3–0 | | | 0–1 | | | | 1–0 | 3–0 | |
| Reynosa | | | | 2–0 | | | | 3–3 | 3–1 | 2–3 | 2–1 | 2–2 | | | | 2–1 |
| U. Curtidores | 1–0 | 1–2 | 1–1 | | 1–0 | 2–1 | 1–0 | | | | | | 2–0 | | 2–1 | |
| U.A. Tamaulipas | | 0–2 | 0–1 | 0–2 | | | | 1–1 | | | 0–4 | | 2–1 | | | 1–1 |
| Vaqueros | | | | 1–2 | | 3–1 | 2–0 | | 3–3 | 1–5 | 2–3 | 0–3 | | 1–1 | | |

Updated to match(es) played on 16 November 2013. Source: SoccerWay
Legend: Blue = home team win; Yellow = draw; Red = away team win.

==== Group 2 ====
===== Standings =====
| Pos | Team | Pld | W | D | L | GF | GA | GD | Pts | Qualification |
|---|---|---|---|---|---|---|---|---|---|---|
| 1 | Linces | 14 | 10 | 2 | 2 | 26 | 13 | +13 | 34 | Advance to Liguilla de Liga |
| 2 | Ocelotes UNACH | 14 | 10 | 2 | 2 | 21 | 10 | +11 | 33 | Advance to Liguilla de Liga |
| 3 | Potros UAEM | 14 | 7 | 3 | 4 | 24 | 16 | +8 | 27 | Advance to Liguilla de Liga |
| 4 | Teca UTN | 14 | 6 | 6 | 2 | 25 | 13 | +12 | 26 | Advance to Liguilla de Liga |
| 5 | Cruz Azul Jasso | 14 | 6 | 3 | 5 | 20 | 16 | +4 | 23 | Advance to Liguilla de Copa |
| 6 | Atlético Coatzacoalcos | 14 | 5 | 7 | 2 | 17 | 14 | +3 | 23 | Advance to Liguilla de Copa |
| 7 | Irapuato | 14 | 5 | 6 | 3 | 18 | 14 | +4 | 22 | Advance to Liguilla de Copa |
| 8 | Real Cuautitlán | 14 | 5 | 4 | 5 | 24 | 22 | +2 | 20 | Advance to Liguilla de Copa |
| 9 | Inter Playa | 14 | 4 | 7 | 3 | 10 | 8 | +2 | 19 | |
| 10 | Atlético Veracruz | 14 | 4 | 3 | 7 | 19 | 24 | −5 | 16 | |
| 11 | Tampico Madero | 14 | 4 | 3 | 7 | 18 | 26 | −8 | 15 | |
| 12 | Orizaba | 14 | 3 | 4 | 7 | 14 | 19 | −5 | 13 | |
| 13 | Delfines "B" | 14 | 2 | 4 | 8 | 15 | 24 | −9 | 12 | |
| 14 | Tuzos UAZ | 14 | 2 | 3 | 9 | 13 | 26 | −13 | 9 | |
| 15 | Patriotas | 14 | 0 | 7 | 7 | 10 | 19 | −9 | 7 | |

Last updated on November 16, 2013.
Source: SoccerWay

===== Results =====
| Home \ Away | ACO | AVE | CRJ | DEL | INT | IRA | LIN | OUC | ORI | PCO | PUM | RCU | TAM | UTN | UAZ |
|---|---|---|---|---|---|---|---|---|---|---|---|---|---|---|---|
| At. Coatzacoalcos | | 1–0 | | | | | | 1–1 | 2–1 | | 1–1 | 2–1 | 3–0 | 1–1 | 2–2 |
| At. Veracruz | | | 1–1 | | | | 0–1 | | 3–2 | | 1–3 | | 4–2 | | 2–0 |
| Cruz Azul Jasso | 3–0 | | | 1–1 | 1–0 | 0–1 | 0–2 | | | 4–0 | | 0–3 | | | |
| Delfines | 1–2 | 3–0 | | | 0–1 | 0–0 | | 1–2 | | 2–2 | | | | | |
| Inter Playa | 0–0 | 3–1 | | | | 1–1 | | 1–0 | 0–0 | 1–1 | | | | | |
| Irapuato | 1–1 | 3–1 | | | | | | 0–0 | 1–1 | | | | | 2–1 | 2–1 |
| Linces | 1–0 | | | 1–0 | 1–0 | 1–0 | | 3–2 | | 1–1 | | 5–1 | | | |
| Ocelotes UNACH | | 2–1 | 2–1 | | | | | | 1–0 | | 1–0 | 2–1 | 1–0 | 1–0 | 2–1 |
| Orizaba | | | 1–2 | 4–0 | | | 3–2 | | | | 1–2 | | 0–0 | 0–3 | 1–0 |
| Patriotas | 1–1 | 1–3 | | | | 1–1 | | 1–3 | 0–0 | | | | | 0–0 | |
| Potros UAEM | | | 1–2 | 3–2 | 2–2 | 1–0 | 1–0 | | | 4–0 | | 2–2 | 3–1 | | |
| Real Cuautitlán | | 1–1 | | 1–1 | 0–1 | 5–3 | | | 3–0 | 2–1 | | | | 1–2 | 2–1 |
| Tampico Madero | | | 2–1 | 3–2 | 1–0 | 0–3 | 2–4 | | | 3–0 | | 1–1 | | | |
| Teca UTN | | 1–1 | 2–2 | 2–0 | 0–0 | | 2–2 | | | | 1–0 | | 4–3 | | 6–0 |
| Tuzos UAZ | | | 0–2 | 1–3 | 0–0 | | 1–2 | | | 4–1 | 2–1 | | 0–0 | | |

Updated to match(es) played on 16 November 2013. Source: SoccerWay
Legend: Blue = home team win; Yellow = draw; Red = away team win.

=== Regular season statistics ===
==== Top goalscorers ====
Players sorted first by goals scored, then by last name.

| Rank | Player | Club | Goals |
|---|---|---|---|
| 1 | (Mexico) Jorge Amador | Loros UdeC | 15 |
| 2 | (Mexico) Martín René Loya | Dorados UACH | 13 |
| 2 | (Mexico) Juan Carlos Martínez | Loros UdeC | 13 |
| 4 | (Mexico) Dante Osorio | Potros UAEM | 11 |
| 5 | (Mexico) Manuel Duarte | Durango | 10 |
| 6 | (Mexico) Jorge Mora | Los Altos | 9 |
| 7 | (Mexico) Sergio Soto | Real Cuautitlán | 8 |
| 9 | (Mexico) Carlos Félix Gámez | Murciélagos | 7 |
| 9 | (Mexico) Francisco Iturbide | Teca UTN | 7 |
| 9 | (Mexico) Luis Ricardo Reyes | Unión de Curtidores | 7 |

=== Liguilla ===
==== Liguilla de Ascenso (Promotion Playoffs) ====
The four best teams of each group play two games against each other on a home-and-away basis. The higher seeded teams play on their home field during the second leg. The winner of each match up is determined by aggregate score. In the quarterfinals and semifinals, if the two teams are tied on aggregate the higher seeded team advances. In the final, if the two teams are tied after both legs, the match goes to extra time and, if necessary, a penalty shoot-out.

Quarter-finals
1 | Loros UdeC (t.p.) | 1 | 4 | 5
5 | Coras de Tepic | 4 | 1 | 5
3 | Ocelotes UNACH | 1 | 4 | 5
7 | Teca UTN | 2 | 2 | 4
2 | Linces (t.p.) | 1 | 2 | 3
7 | Unión de Curtidores | 2 | 1 | 3
4 | Murciélagos (t.p.) | 1 | 1 | 2
6 | Potros UAEM | 1 | 1 | 2

Semi-finals
1 | Loros UdeC | 1 | 3 | 4
3 | Ocelotes UNACH | 0 | 1 | 1
2 | Linces | 3 | 3 | 6
4 | Murciélagos | 0 | 1 | 1

Final
1 | Loros UdeC | 3 | 0 | 3 (7)
2 | Linces (pen.) | 1 | 2 | 3 (8)

- (t.p.) The team was classified by its best position in the general table

==== Quarter-finals ====
| Team 1 | Agg. | Team 2 | 1st leg | 2nd leg |
|---|---|---|---|---|
| Loros UdeC | 5–5 | Coras de Tepic | 1–4 | 4–1 |
| Ocelotes UNACH | 5–4 | Teca UTN | 1–2 | 4–2 |
| Linces | 3–3 | Unión de Curtidores | 1–2 | 2–1 |
| Murciélagos | 2–2 | Potros UAEM | 1–1 | 1–1 |

===== First leg =====
| 27 November 2013 | Teca UTN | 2–1 | Ocelotes UNACH | Ciudad Nezahualcóyotl |
| 12:00 | | Report | | Stadium: Estadio Neza 86; Attendance: 600; Referee: Óscar Mejía García |

| 27 November 2013 | Unión de Curtidores | 2–1 | Linces | León |
| 19:30 | | Report | | Stadium: Estadio León; Attendance: 7,000; Referee: Christian Adrián Ramírez Tejeda |

| 27 November 2013 | Coras de Tepic | 4–1 | Loros UdeC | Tepic |
| 20:30 | | Report | | Stadium: Arena Cora; Attendance: 5,000; Referee: Eduardo Alberto Vázquez Aguilar |

| 28 November 2013 | Potros UAEM | 1-1 | Murciélagos | Toluca |
| 15:00 | | Report | | Stadium: Estadio Universitario Alberto "Chivo" Córdoba; Attendance: 3,000; Referee: Antonio de Jesús Olalde Vazquez |

===== Second leg =====
| 30 November 2013 | Ocelotes UNACH | 4–2 (5–4 agg.) | Teca UTN | Tapachula |
| 15:00 | Flores 11'; Damasceno 48'; Díaz 53'; Messías 83' | Report | Iturbide 44', 77' | Stadium: Estadio Olímpico de Tapachula; Attendance: 2,500; Referee: Carlos Javier Ríos García |

| 30 November 2013 | Linces | 2–1 (3–3 agg.) | Unión de Curtidores | Tlaxcala |
| 15:00 | Villalpando 4'; Torres 22' | Report | Tovar 6' | Stadium: Estadio Tlahuicole; Attendance: 2,000; Referee: Ángel Flores García |

| 30 November 2013 | Loros UdeC | 4–1 (5–5 agg.) | Coras de Tepic | Colima |
| 16:00 | Partida 3'; Martínez 59', 68'; García 93' | Report | Padilla 50' og | Stadium: Estadio Olímpico Universitario de Colima; Attendance: 1,000; Referee: Míchel Ricardo Espinoza Ávalos |

| 1 December 2013 | Murciélagos | 1–1 (2–2 agg.) | Potros UAEM | Guamúchil |
| 19:05 | Aguas 65' | Report | García 19' | Stadium: Estadio Alfredo Díaz Angulo; Attendance: 4,500; Referee: Jesús Leopoldo Guerrero García |

==== Semi-finals ====
| Team 1 | Agg. | Team 2 | 1st leg | 2nd leg |
|---|---|---|---|---|
| Loros UdeC | 4–1 | Ocelotes UNACH | 1–0 | 3–1 |
| Linces | 6–1 | Murciélagos | 3–0 | 3–1 |

===== First leg =====
| 4 December 2013 | Loros UdeC | 1-0 | Ocelotes UNACH | Colima |
| 16:00 | Amador 65' | Report | | Stadium: Estadio Olímpico Universitario de Colima; Attendance: 2,000; Referee: Jesús Leopoldo Guerrero García |

| 4 December 2013 | Murciélagos | 0–3 | Linces | Guamúchil |
| 20:05 | | Report | Torres 11', 22'; Villalpando 18' | Stadium: Estadio Alfredo Díaz Angulo; Attendance: 5,000; Referee: Christian Adrián Ramírez Tejeda |

===== Second leg =====
| 7 December 2013 | Ocelotes UNACH | 1–3 (1–4 agg.) | Loros UdeC | Tapachula |
| 15:00 | U. López 86' | Report | E. López 35'; Amador 65'; García 78' | Stadium: Estadio Olímpico de Tapachula; Attendance: 3,500; Referee: Ángel Flores Galicia |

| 7 December 2013 | Linces | 3–1 (6–1 agg.) | Murciélagos | Tlaxcala |
| 15:00 | García 22'; Zazueta 39'; Cruz 79' | Report | Aguas 70' | Stadium: Estadio Tlahuicole; Attendance: 2,000; Referee: Míchel Ricardo Espinoza Ávalos |

==== Final ====
| Team 1 | Agg. | Team 2 | 1st leg | 2nd leg |
|---|---|---|---|---|
| Linces (pen.) | 3–3 | Loros UdeC | 1–3 | 2–0 |

===== First leg =====
| 11 December 2013 | Loros UdeC | 3–1 | Linces | Colima |
| 16:00 | Míchel 31'; Martínez 34', 69' | Report | Ledezma 69' | Stadium: Estadio Olímpico Universitario de Colima; Attendance: 3,500; Referee: Jesús Leopoldo Guerrero García |

===== Second leg =====
| 14 December 2013 | Linces | 2–0 (3–3 agg.) (8–7 p) | Loros UdeC | Tlaxcala |
| 15:00 | | Report | | Stadium: Estadio Tlahuicole; Attendance: 4,000; Referee: Ángel Flores Galicia |

Apertura 2013 winners:

1st title

==== Liguilla de Copa ====
The Copa de la Segunda División (Second Division Cup) was a tournament created for those teams that had no chance to play the Liguilla de Ascenso. In each of the leagues the regular season is disputed for each tournament, the first eight (four of each group) advance to their respective league to determine the champion of the league, the next four of each group accessed the cup liguilla. If a team had no right to promotion, or was a reserve could not play promotion playoffs, so if he was in higher positions directly access the Cup, and gave way to teams that could rise.

Quarter-finals
10 | Los Altos | 0 | 1 | 1
11 | Dorados UACH | 1 | 3 | 4
13 | Atlético Coatzacoalcos | 0 | 1 | 1
15 | Irapuato | 2 | 1 | 3
12 | Cruz Azul Jasso | 1 | 3 | 4
14 | Durango | 3 | 1 | 4
9 | Águilas Reales | 0 | 1 | 1
18 | Real Cuautitlán | 2 | 0 | 2

Semi-finals
11 | Dorados UACH | 1 | 1 | 2
15 | Irapuato | 3 | 0 | 3
12 | Cruz Azul Jasso | 1 | 2 | 3
18 | Real Cuautitlán | 1 | 0 | 1

Final
15 | Irapuato | 0 | 0 | 0
12 | Cruz Azul Jasso | 1 | 0 | 1

Apertura 2013 winners:

1st title

== Torneo Clausura ==
=== Regular season ===
==== Group 1 ====
===== Standings =====
| Pos | Team | Pld | W | D | L | GF | GA | GD | Pts | Qualification |
|---|---|---|---|---|---|---|---|---|---|---|
| 1 | Loros UdeC | 15 | 11 | 3 | 1 | 36 | 11 | +25 | 39 | Advance to Liguilla de Liga |
| 2 | Unión de Curtidores | 15 | 8 | 3 | 4 | 30 | 14 | +16 | 32 | Advance to Liguilla de Liga |
| 3 | Coras de Tepic | 15 | 8 | 5 | 2 | 17 | 5 | +12 | 32 | Advance to Liguilla de Liga |
| 4 | Los Altos | 15 | 10 | 2 | 3 | 20 | 9 | +11 | 32 | Advance to Liguilla de Liga |
| 5 | Estudiantes Tecos | 15 | 8 | 1 | 6 | 16 | 16 | 0 | 26 | Advance to Liguilla de Copa |
| 6 | Indios UACJ | 15 | 6 | 4 | 5 | 23 | 24 | −1 | 23 | Advance to Liguilla de Copa |
| 7 | Durango | 15 | 5 | 6 | 4 | 15 | 17 | −2 | 21 | Advance to Liguilla de Copa |
| 8 | Murciélagos | 15 | 5 | 4 | 6 | 18 | 21 | −3 | 21 | Advance to Liguilla de Copa |
| 9 | Cimarrones | 15 | 6 | 2 | 7 | 16 | 19 | −3 | 20 | |
| 10 | Águilas Reales | 15 | 6 | 1 | 8 | 10 | 18 | −8 | 19 | |
| 11 | U.A. Tamaulipas | 15 | 4 | 4 | 7 | 18 | 21 | −3 | 17 | |
| 12 | Vaqueros | 15 | 5 | 2 | 8 | 10 | 20 | −10 | 17 | |
| 13 | Dorados Fuerza UACH | 15 | 3 | 5 | 7 | 16 | 24 | −8 | 16 | |
| 14 | Cachorros UdeG | 15 | 3 | 4 | 8 | 12 | 20 | −8 | 14 | |
| 15 | Bravos | 15 | 4 | 1 | 10 | 13 | 23 | −10 | 13 | |
| 16 | Reynosa | 15 | 2 | 6 | 7 | 13 | 20 | −7 | 12 | |

Last updated on April 19, 2014.
Source: SoccerWay

===== Results =====
| Home \ Away | AGR | BRA | CUG | CIM | COR | DFU | DUR | EST | IUJ | LUC | LAS | MUR | REY | UDC | UAT | VAQ |
|---|---|---|---|---|---|---|---|---|---|---|---|---|---|---|---|---|
| Águilas Reales | | | | | 0–1 | | 1–0 | | 1–1 | 0–3 | 0–1 | 2–1 | | 2–2 | | |
| Bravos | 0–1 | | | | 0–2 | 3–1 | 0–1 | | | 2–1 | | 0–1 | | 1–0 | 0–2 | |
| Cachorros UdeG | 0–1 | 2–0 | | | 0–0 | 1–1 | 0–1 | | | 1–3 | | | | 1–4 | 1–1 | |
| Cimarrones | 1–0 | 1–2 | 2–3 | | | | | 1–0 | | 0–1 | | | 3–1 | | 3–1 | 1–0 |
| Coras | | | | 1–0 | | | 3–0 | | 0–1 | 1–2 | 0–0 | 0–0 | | 1–0 | | |
| Dorados UACH | 0–1 | | | 2–0 | 1–1 | | 0–0 | 0–0 | | | | | | 2–2 | | 0–1 |
| Durango | | | | 1–1 | | | | | 2–1 | 1–1 | 2–3 | 2–1 | | 2–2 | | 0–0 |
| Est. Tecos | 1–0 | 2–1 | 1–0 | | 0–2 | | 3–1 | | | | | | 1–0 | | 2–1 | |
| Indios UACJ | | 2–1 | 1–1 | 1–1 | | 2–1 | | 3–0 | | | 2–0 | | 1–1 | | | 7–0 |
| Loros UdeC | | | | | | 4–2 | | 4–1 | 6–0 | | 0–0 | 2–2 | 2–0 | | | 3–0 |
| Los Altos | | 3–2 | 1–0 | 0–1 | | 3–1 | | 1–0 | | | | | 3–0 | | 3–0 | 1–0 |
| Murciélagos | | | 0–2 | 4–1 | | 1–3 | | 0–3 | 3–0 | | 1–0 | | 0–0 | | | 1–0 |
| Reynosa | 4–0 | 1–1 | 2–0 | | 1–3 | 0–2 | 1–1 | | | | | | | 1–2 | | 1–1 |
| U. Curtidores | | | | 2–0 | | | | 1–0 | 5–1 | 0–1 | 0–1 | 4–1 | | | | 2–0 |
| U.A. Tamaulipas | 2–0 | | | | 0–0 | 5–0 | 0–1 | | 2–0 | 1–3 | | 2–2 | | 0–4 | | |
| Vaqueros | 2–1 | 3–0 | 2–0 | | 0–2 | | | 1–2 | | | | | 0–0 | | 1–0 | |

Updated to match(es) played on 19 April 2014. Source: SoccerWay
Legend: Blue = home team win; Yellow = draw; Red = away team win.

==== Group 2 ====
===== Standings =====
| Pos | Team | Pld | W | D | L | GF | GA | GD | Pts | Qualification |
|---|---|---|---|---|---|---|---|---|---|---|
| 1 | Cruz Azul Jasso | 14 | 8 | 2 | 4 | 19 | 12 | +7 | 27 | Advance to Liguilla de Copa |
| 2 | Irapuato | 14 | 7 | 3 | 4 | 19 | 12 | +7 | 27 | Advance to Liguilla de Copa |
| 3 | Real Cuautitlán | 14 | 6 | 5 | 3 | 22 | 19 | +3 | 25 | Advance to Liguilla de Liga |
| 4 | Orizaba | 14 | 6 | 5 | 3 | 14 | 12 | +2 | 25 | Advance to Liguilla de Liga |
| 5 | Atlético Coatzacoalcos | 14 | 6 | 4 | 4 | 19 | 12 | +7 | 22 | Advance to Liguilla de Liga |
| 6 | Atlético Veracruz | 14 | 6 | 3 | 5 | 11 | 15 | −4 | 22 | Advance to Liguilla de Copa |
| 7 | Delfines "B" | 14 | 6 | 3 | 5 | 18 | 20 | −2 | 21 | Advance to Liguilla de Copa |
| 8 | Potros UAEM | 14 | 5 | 5 | 4 | 17 | 15 | +2 | 20 | Advance to Liguilla de Liga |
| 9 | Inter Playa | 14 | 5 | 3 | 6 | 16 | 19 | −3 | 20 | |
| 10 | Linces | 14 | 5 | 3 | 6 | 25 | 19 | +6 | 19 | |
| 11 | Ocelotes UNACH | 14 | 3 | 5 | 6 | 16 | 18 | −2 | 16 | |
| 12 | Teca UTN | 14 | 3 | 6 | 5 | 15 | 17 | −2 | 15 | |
| 13 | Patriotas | 14 | 2 | 6 | 6 | 17 | 24 | −7 | 14 | |
| 14 | Tampico Madero | 14 | 3 | 5 | 6 | 11 | 19 | −8 | 14 | |
| 15 | Tuzos UAZ | 14 | 3 | 4 | 7 | 12 | 18 | −6 | 13 | |

Last updated on April 19, 2014.
Source: SoccerWay

===== Results =====
| Home \ Away | ACO | AVE | CRJ | DEL | INT | IRA | LIN | OUC | ORI | PCO | PUM | RCU | TAM | UTN | UAZ |
|---|---|---|---|---|---|---|---|---|---|---|---|---|---|---|---|
| At. Coatzacoalcos | | | 1–0 | 3–0 | 4–0 | 2–2 | 2–1 | | | 1–1 | | | | | |
| At. Veracruz | 1–0 | | | 0–1 | 0–2 | 1–0 | | 0–4 | | 2–1 | | 2–0 | | 0–0 | |
| Cruz Azul Jasso | | 0–0 | | | | | | 1–1 | 1–2 | | 3–1 | | 3–1 | 1–0 | 1–0 |
| Delfines | | | 2–1 | | | | 1–0 | | 2–3 | | 3–2 | 1–2 | 1–1 | 2–0 | 1–0 |
| Inter Playa | | | 0–1 | 1–1 | | | 3–1 | | | | 0–1 | 2–1 | 3–0 | 2–2 | 3–2 |
| Irapuato | | | 0–1 | 3–0 | 2–0 | | 3–0 | | | 3–1 | 2–2 | 0–2 | 1–0 | | |
| Linces | | 4–0 | 1–2 | | | | | | 1–1 | | 2–0 | | 4–1 | 5–1 | 1–1 |
| Ocelotes UNACH | 2–2 | | | 1–1 | 0–0 | 0–1 | 1–0 | | | 4–2 | | | | | |
| Orizaba | 0–0 | 0–1 | | | 1–0 | 0–0 | | 3–1 | | 1–0 | | 1–1 | | | |
| Patriotas | | | 1–3 | 3–2 | 3–0 | | 0–0 | | | | 0–0 | 1–1 | 2–2 | | 2–2 |
| Potros UAEM | 1–0 | 1–3 | | | | | | 1–1 | 3–1 | | | | | 2–0 | 3–0 |
| Real Cuautitlán | 1–0 | | 2–1 | | | | 3–5 | 3–1 | | | 0–0 | | 1–1 | | |
| Tampico Madero | 1–2 | 1–0 | | | | | | 1–0 | 0–1 | | 0–0 | | | 1–1 | 1–0 |
| Teca UTN | 1–2 | | | | | 1–2 | | 2–0 | 0–0 | 3–0 | | 2–2 | | | |
| Tuzos UAZ | 1–0 | 1–1 | | | | 0–2 | | 1–0 | 2–0 | | | 2–3 | | 0–0 | |

Updated to match(es) played on 19 April 2014. Source: SoccerWay
Legend: Blue = home team win; Yellow = draw; Red = away team win.

=== Regular season statistics ===
==== Top goalscorers ====
Players sorted first by goals scored, then by last name.

| Rank | Player | Club | Goals |
|---|---|---|---|
| 1 | (Mexico) Juan Carlos Martínez | Loros UdeC | 13 |
| 2 | (Mexico) Luis Ricardo Reyes | Unión de Curtidores | 10 |
| 3 | (Mexico) Jorge Amador | Loros UdeC | 8 |
| 3 | (Mexico) Juan Diego González | Cruz Azul Jasso | 8 |
| 3 | (Mexico) Emmanuel Tapia | Unión de Curtidores | 8 |
| 3 | (Mexico) Jesús Eleazar Silva | Cimarrones de Sonora | 8 |
| 7 | (Mexico) Diego Andrade | Irapuato | 7 |
| 7 | (Panama) Amet Ramírez | Linces de Tlaxcala | 7 |
| 7 | (Mexico) Sergio Soto | Real Cuautitlán | 7 |
| 10 | (Mexico) Kevin Favela | Orizaba | 6 |

=== Liguilla ===
==== Liguilla de Ascenso (Promotion Playoffs) ====
The four best teams of each group play two games against each other on a home-and-away basis. The higher seeded teams play on their home field during the second leg. The winner of each match up is determined by aggregate score. In the quarterfinals and semifinals, if the two teams are tied on aggregate the higher seeded team advances. In the final, if the two teams are tied after both legs, the match goes to extra time and, if necessary, a penalty shoot-out.

Quarter-finals
3 | Unión de Curtidores | 3 | 1 | 4
6 | Orizaba | 2 | 1 | 3
4 | Los Altos (t.p.) | 1 | 1 | 2
5 | Real Cuautitlán | 1 | 1 | 2
1 | Loros UdeC (t.p.) | 2 | 3 | 5
8 | Potros UAEM | 4 | 1 | 5
2 | Coras de Tepic | 1 | 0 | 1
7 | Atlético Coatzacoalcos | 0 | 2 | 2

Semi-finals
3 | Unión de Curtidores | 3 | 4 | 5
4 | Los Altos | 1 | 3 | 4
1 | Loros UdeC | 0 | 3 | 3
7 | Atlético Coatzacoalcos | 1 | 3 | 4

Final
3 | Unión de Curtidores | 0 | 0 | 0
7 | Atlético Coatzacoalcos | 3 | 1 | 4

- (t.p.) The team was classified by its best position in the general table

==== Quarter-finals ====
| Team 1 | Agg. | Team 2 | 1st leg | 2nd leg |
|---|---|---|---|---|
| Unión de Curtidores | 4–3 | Orizaba | 3–2 | 1–1 |
| Los Altos | 2–2 | Real Cuautitlán | 1–1 | 1–1 |
| Loros UdeC | 5–5 | Potros UAEM | 2–4 | 3–1 |
| Coras de Tepic | 1–2 | Atlético Coatzacoalcos | 1–0 | 0–2 |

===== First leg =====
| 23 April 2014 | Real Cuautitlán | 1-1 | Los Altos | Cuautitlán |
| 16:00 | Pérez 29' | Report | Mora 86' | Stadium: Estadio Los Pinos; Attendance: 500 |

| 23 April 2014 | Potros UAEM | 4–2 | Loros UdeC | Toluca |
| 16:00 | Osorio 7', 48'; Arriaga 12'; López 15' | Report | Martínez 70', 76' | Stadium: Estadio Universitario Alberto "Chivo" Córdoba; Attendance: 2,000 |

| 24 April 2014 | Orizaba | 2–3 | Unión de Curtidores | Veracruz |
| 18:00 | Bonilla 55'; Omar 86' | Report | Tapia 21', 29'; Saavedra 30' | Stadium: Estadio Luis "Pirata" Fuente; Attendance: 3,000 |

| 24 April 2014 | Atlético Coatzacoalcos | 0–1 | Coras de Tepic | Coatzacoalcos |
| 19:00 | | Report | López 49' | Stadium: Estadio Rafael Hernández Ochoa; Attendance: 3,000 |

===== Second leg =====
| 26 April 2014 | Loros UdeC | 3–1 (5–5 agg.) | Potros UAEM | Colima |
| 16:00 | Martínez 10'; Míchel 53'; Vallejo 75' | Report | Ochoa 27' | Stadium: Estadio Olímpico Universitario de Colima; Attendance: 1,500 |

| 26 April 2014 | Los Altos | 1–1 (2–2 agg.) | Real Cuautitlán | Yahualica |
| 20:00 | Martínez 89' | Report | Doncel 86' | Stadium: Estadio Las Ánimas; Attendance: 500 |

| 27 April 2014 | Unión de Curtidores | 1–1 (4–3 agg.) | Orizaba | León |
| 12:00 | Saavedra 65' | Report | Favela 90' | Stadium: Estadio León; Attendance: 1,500 |

| 27 April 2014 | Coras de Tepic | 0–2 (1–2 agg.) | Atlético Coatzacoalcos | Tepic |
| 20:00 | | Report | Castillo 44'; Rodríguez 57' | Stadium: Estadio Olímpico Santa Teresita; Attendance: 5,500 |

==== Semi-finals ====
| Team 1 | Agg. | Team 2 | 1st leg | 2nd leg |
|---|---|---|---|---|
| Unión de Curtidores | 5–4 | Los Altos | 1–1 | 4–3 |
| Loros UdeC | 3–4 | Atlético Coatzacoalcos | 0–1 | 3–3 |

===== First leg =====
| 30 April 2014 | Atlético Coatzacoalcos | 1–0 | Loros UdeC | Coatzacoalcos |
| 19:00 | Rodríguez 75' | Report | | Stadium: Estadio Rafael Hernández Ochoa; Attendance: 2,000 |

| 1 May 2014 | Los Altos | 1–1 | Unión de Curtidores | Yahualica |
| 20:00 | Martínez 14' | Report | Sánchez 11' | Stadium: Estadio Las Ánimas; Attendance: 2,000 |

===== Second leg =====
| 3 May 2014 | Loros UdeC | 3–3 (3–4 agg.) | Atlético Coatzacoalcos | Colima |
| 16:00 | Mejía 9' og Partida 58', 85' | Report | Mejía 51'; Luna 54'; Castillo 76' | Stadium: Estadio Olímpico Universitario de Colima; Attendance: 5,000 |

| 4 May 2014 | Unión de Curtidores | 4–3 (5–4 agg.) | Los Altos | León |
| 12:00 | Reyes 9', 54', 90'; Santoyo 71' | Report | Tovar 35'; Mora 60', 82' | Stadium: Estadio León; Attendance: 4,000 |

==== Final ====
| Team 1 | Agg. | Team 2 | 1st leg | 2nd leg |
|---|---|---|---|---|
| Unión de Curtidores | 0–4 | Atlético Coatzacoalcos | 0–3 | 0–1 |

===== First leg =====
| 8 May 2014 | Atlético Coatzacoalcos | 3–0 | Unión de Curtidores | Coatzacoalcos |
| 19:00 | Nungaray 8'; Rodríguez 38', 58' | Report | | Stadium: Estadio Rafael Hernández Ochoa; Attendance: 5,000 |

===== Second leg =====
| 11 May 2014 | Unión de Curtidores | 0–1 (0–4 agg.) | Atlético Coatzacoalcos | León |
| 16:00 | | Report | Ramos 19' | Stadium: Estadio León; Attendance: 10,000 |

Clausura 2014 winners:

1st title

==== Liguilla de Copa ====
The Copa de la Segunda División (Second Division Cup) was a tournament created for those teams that had no chance to play the Liguilla de Ascenso. In each of the leagues the regular season is disputed for each tournament, the first eight (four of each group) advance to their respective league to determine the champion of the league, the next four of each group accessed the cup liguilla. If a team had no right to promotion, or was a reserve could not play promotion playoffs, so if he was in higher positions directly access the Cup, and gave way to teams that could rise.

Quarter-finals
5 | Cruz Azul Jasso | 2 | 2 | 4
15 | Murciélagos | 1 | 1 | 2
12 | Indios UACJ | 1 | 2 | 3
7 | Estudiantes Tecos | 1 | 0 | 1
11 | Atlético Veracruz (t.p.) | 2 | 0 | 2
13 | Delfines "B" | 0 | 2 | 2
6 | Irapuato (t.p.) | 0 | 2 | 2
14 | Durango | 2 | 0 | 2

Semi-finals
5 | Cruz Azul Jasso | 0 | 2 | 2
12 | Indios UACJ | 2 | 2 | 4
11 | Atlético Veracruz | 1 | 2 | 3
6 | Irapuato | 2 | 3 | 5

Final
12 | Indios UACJ (pen.) | 0 | 0 | 0 (5)
6 | Irapuato | 0 | 0 | 0 (4)

- (t.p.) The team was classified by its best position in the general table

Clausura 2014 winners:

1st title

== Relegation Table ==
| P | Team | Pts | G | Pts/G |
|---|---|---|---|---|
| 1 | Loros UdeC | 65 | 27 | 2.4074 |
| 2 | Coras de Tepic | 56 | 27 | 2.0741 |
| 3 | Unión de Curtidores | 51 | 27 | 1.8889 |
| 4 | Cruz Azul Jasso | 47 | 25 | 1.8800 |
| 5 | Los Altos | 50 | 27 | 1.8519 |
| 6 | Linces de Tlaxcala | 46 | 25 | 1.8400 |
| 7 | Ocelotes UNACH | 44 | 25 | 1.7600 |
| 8 | Murciélagos | 47 | 27 | 1.7407 |
| 9 | Irapuato | 43 | 25 | 1.7200 |
| 10 | Potros UAEM | 42 | 25 | 1.6800 |
| 11 | Real Cuautitlán | 41 | 25 | 1.6400 |
| 12 | Teca UTN | 40 | 26 | 1.5385 |
| 13 | Atlético Coatzacoalcos | 38 | 25 | 1.5200 |
| 14 | Águilas Reales | 41 | 27 | 1.5185 |
| 15 | Inter Playa | 36 | 25 | 1.4400 |
| 16 | Atlético Veracruz | 35 | 25 | 1.4000 |
| 17 | Dorados UACH | 36 | 27 | 1.3333 |
| 18 | Indios UACJ | 36 | 27 | 1.3333 |
| 19 | Durango | 34 | 27 | 1.2593 |
| 20 | Estudiantes Tecos | 34 | 27 | 1.2593 |
| 21 | Vaqueros | 34 | 27 | 1.2593 |
| 22 | Cimarrones de Sonora | 34 | 27 | 1.2593 |
| 23 | Orizaba | 29 | 25 | 1.1600 |
| 24 | Bravos | 31 | 27 | 1.1481 |
| 25 | Tampico Madero | 27 | 25 | 1.0800 |
| 26 | Delfines "B" | 26 | 25 | 1.0400 |
| 27 | Reynosa | 28 | 27 | 1.0370 |
| 28 | Cachorros UdeG | 27 | 27 | 1.0000 |
| 29 | Tuzos UAZ | 22 | 26 | 0.8462 |
| 30 | Patriotas de Córdoba | 18 | 26 | 0.6923 |
| 31 | U.A. Tamaulipas | 18 | 27 | 0.6667 |

Last updated: 19 April 2014
Source: Liga Premier FMF
P = Position; G = Games played; Pts = Points; Pts/G = Ratio of points to games played

== Promotion Final ==
The Promotion Final is a series of matches played by the champions of the tournaments Apertura and Clausura, the game is played to determine the winning team of the promotion to Ascenso MX. The first leg was played on 14 May 2014, and the second leg was played on 17 May 2014.

| Team 1 | Agg. | Team 2 | 1st leg | 2nd leg |
|---|---|---|---|---|
| Linces de Tlaxcala | 3–4 | Atlético Coatzacoalcos | 2–3 | 1–1 |

=== First leg ===
| 14 May 2014 | Atlético Coatzacoalcos | 3–2 | Linces de Tlaxcala | Coatzacoalcos |
| 17:00 | Rodríguez 41'; González 48'; Arriaga 79' | Report | Ramírez 29'; Coba 47' | Stadium: Estadio Rafael Hernández Ochoa; Attendance: 4,000; Referee: Saúl Fernando Orozco |

=== Second leg ===
| 17 May 2014 | Linces de Tlaxcala | 1–1 (3–4 agg.) | Atlético Coatzacoalcos | Tlaxcala |
| 16:00 | Ledezma 90' | Report | Rodríguez 2' | Stadium: Estadio Tlahuicole; Attendance: 10,000; Referee: Ángel Flores |

2013-14 season winners:

1st Title title

== See also ==
- 2013–14 Liga MX season
- 2013–14 Ascenso MX season
- 2013–14 Liga de Nuevos Talentos season
