= Marcelo Aguas =

Mexican footballer (born 1990)

Personal information
- Full name: Marcelo Eduardo Aguas Villarreal
- Date of birth: 1 August 1990 (age 36)
- Place of birth: Guadalupe, Nuevo León, Mexico
- Height: 1.86 m (6 ft 1 in)
- Position: Forward

Senior career*
Years	Team	Apps	(Gls)
2007–2008	Panteras Negras GNL	26	(8)
2008–2010	Chiapas	0	(0)
2008–2009	→ Jaguares B	4	(0)
2008–2009	→ Jaguares C	22	(19)
2011	Monarcas Morelia	0	(0)
2011	FC Excelsior	13	(11)
2012	Loros UdeC	13	(5)
2012–2013	De Los Altos	29	(19)
2013–2014	Murciélagos	33	(6)
2015	Irapuato	1	(0)
2015	Murciélagos	12	(6)
2016	Deportivo Carchá		
- * Club domestic league appearances and goals

Marcelo Eduardo Aguas Villarreal (born 1 August 1990) is a retired Mexican footballer who as of 2009/10 season played for Chiapas U20 youth team.
