= Aldo Monzonis =

Mexican footballer (born 1993)

Personal information
- Full name: Aldo Monzonis Dueñas
- Date of birth: 13 September 1993 (age 33)
- Place of birth: Guadalajara, Jalisco, Mexico
- Height: 1.79 m (5 ft 10 1/2 in)
- Position: Midfielder

Senior career*
Years	Team	Apps	(Gls)
2009–2012	Guadalajara	0	(0)
2012–2013	Ballenas Galeana Morelos	45	(9)
2014	C.D. De los Altos	17	(1)
2014	Zacatepec Siglo XXI	7	(0)
2015–2017	Pioneros de Cancún	62	(11)
2017–2018	UdeC	42	(15)
2018–2019	Atlético Reynosa	25	(7)
2019	UAT	2	(0)
2020–2021	Cafetaleros de Chiapas	20	(2)
2021–2022	Real Estelí FC	0	(0)
- * Club domestic league appearances and goals as of 17 March 2021

Aldo Monzonis Dueñas (born September 13, 1993) is a Mexican professional footballer who plays as a midfielder for Cafetaleros de Chiapas.
