= Luis García (footballer, born March 1993) =

Mexican footballer (born 1993)

Personal information
- Full name: Luis Arcadio García Bañuelos
- Date of birth: 25 March 1993 (age 33)
- Place of birth: Mazatlán, Sinaloa, Mexico
- Height: 1.78 m (5 ft 10 in)
- Position: Winger

Team information
- Current team: Marquense

Youth career
- 2009–2011: Pachuca

Senior career*
Years	Team	Apps	(Gls)
2011–2012	Pachuca	4	(0)
2012–2013	→ Murciélagos (loan)	32	(6)
2013–2014	→ Linces de Tlaxcala (loan)	22	(6)
2014–2015	Tlaxcala	27	(2)
2015–2016	Pioneros de Cancún	32	(10)
2016–2017	Murciélagos	13	(0)
2017–2019	UdeC	92	(24)
2020–2021	Atlante	38	(8)
2021–2023	Necaxa	22	(4)
2022–2023	→ Puebla (loan)	22	(0)
2023–2025	Puebla	3	(0)
2025–2026	Sinaloa	7	(1)
2026–	Marquense	0	(0)
- * Club domestic league appearances and goals as of 15 July 2023

Luis Arcadio García Bañuelos (Note: In this Spanish name, the first or paternal surname is García and the second or maternal family name is Bañuelos.) (born 25 March 1993) is a Mexican professional footballer who plays as a defender for Liga Bantrab club Marquense.
