= Jesús Moreno =

Mexican footballer (born 1990)

Personal information
- Full name: Jesús Alberto Moreno Salas
- Date of birth: 3 May 1990 (age 36)
- Place of birth: Zamora, Michoacán, Mexico
- Height: 1.75 m (5 ft 9 in)
- Position: Forward

Senior career*
Years	Team	Apps	(Gls)
2011–2013	San Luis	4	(0)
2013–2016	Chiapas	0	(0)
2013–2015	→ Oaxaca (loan)	74	(18)
2016–2017	América	4	(1)
2017	→ Tampico (loan)	13	(1)
2017–2018	Tampico	10	(0)
2018	Correcaminos UAT	6	(0)
- * Club domestic league appearances and goals as of 2 May 2018

Jesús Alberto Moreno Salas (Note: In this Spanish name, the first or paternal surname is Moreno and the second or maternal family name is Salas.) (born 3 May 1990) is a Mexican former professional footballer who played as a forward.

== Career ==
He debuted with San Luis on 30 July 2011 against Tecos de la UAG, on the 2nd date of the 2011 Apertura Tournament of the Mexican First Division. He then went on to play with Unión de Curtidores in the Second Division of Mexico. Prior to the 2013 Apertura Tournament of the Liga de Ascenso de México, his arrival at the Alebrijes of Oaxaca is confirmed.

He was the top scorer champion in the Copa MX, equaling the Paraguayan midfielder of the UNAM Pumas, Silvio Torales. Moreno scored 5 goals in six games in the group stage of the competition. He scored a triplet to Jaguares de Chiapas on the third date, a goal against Pumas UNAM in the turn of key 1 and on the last day he scored against Cafetaleros de Tapachula to finalize the scoring quintet and thus share the top with the Guaraní Silvio Torales.

On 16 December 2015, the Liga MX draft took place, where Jesús Alberto Moreno is announced as a new signing for Club América.

The opportunity comes to him, when he returns to play in first, playing for the first time as a starter, on Saturday, 27 February 2016, against the Tigres de la UANL, scoring the first goal of the game and going out of change at minute 75.

After his brief stint at Club América, he arrived in mid-November on loan as a reinforcement of the 2017 Clausura Tournament.

In December 2017, his transfer from Tampico Madero to Correcaminos UAT, archrival of Tampico, was confirmed. This transfer caused the discontent of the celestial fans.

== Honours ==
América

- CONCACAF Champions League: 2015–16
