= Mario Rodríguez (footballer, born 1991) =

Mexican footballer

Mario Rodríguez Bañuelos (born 18 March 1991 in Zapopan) is a Mexican former professional footballer who last played for Inter Playa del Carmen.
