= Santiago San Román =

Mexican footballer (born 1991)

Personal information
- Full name: Santiago San Román Celorio
- Date of birth: September 21, 1991 (age 35)
- Place of birth: Mexico City, Mexico
- Height: 1.79 m (5 ft 10 1/2 in)
- Position: Midfielder

Senior career*
Years	Team	Apps	(Gls)
2013–2016	Oaxaca	66	(8)
2016	Atlas	0	(0)
- * Club domestic league appearances and goals

Santiago San Román (born 21 September 1991) is a Mexican former professional footballer, who played for Atlas of Liga MX. He is currently the Director of Football for Toluca F.C. of Liga MX.
