= Estadio Alfredo Díaz Angulo =

Coordinates: 25.4464°N 108.0740°W

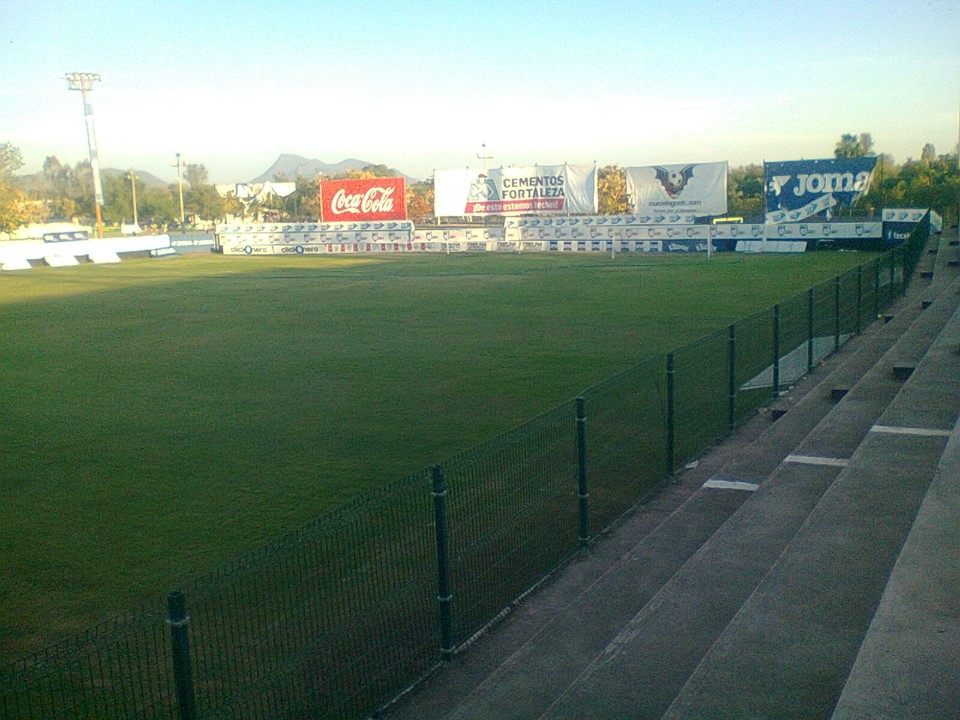

The Estadio Alfredo Díaz Angulo, also known by its former name Coloso del Dique, is a multi-use stadium in Guamúchil, a city in Salvador Alvarado, Sinaloa, Mexico.

== History ==
The stadium is one of two facilities owned by the Salvador Alvarado municipal government. Formerly known as the Coloso del Dique, it was renamed in 2015 after Alfredo Díaz Angulo, nicknamed El Guelito, a former municipal president (mayor) of Salvador Alvarado. The facility is used primarily for association football and has a capacity of 5,000. It also hosts the annual Carnaval de Guamúchil and other municipal sporting events. As of 2025, portions of the facility are in deteriorating condition. It was the former home stadium of the Murciélagos F.C.
