= Marco Tovar =

Mexican footballer (born 1990)

Personal information
- Full name: Marco Antonio Tovar Frausto
- Date of birth: May 25, 1990 (age 36)
- Place of birth: Monterrey, Mexico
- Height: 1.74 m (5 ft 9 in)
- Position: Defender

College career
Years	Team	Apps	(Gls)
–2009	Monterrey Trojans		

Senior career*
Years	Team	Apps	(Gls)
2009–2016	Tigres UANL Premier		
2014–2015	→ Irapuato (loan)	22	(3)
2015–2016	→ Juárez (loan)	20	(0)
2016–2017	Murciélagos	23	(1)
2018	El Paso Coyotes (indoor)	1	(0)
2019–2020	Monterrey Flash (indoor)	23	(4)
- * Club domestic league appearances and goals as of 17 June 2022

Marco Antonio Tovar Frausto (born 25 May 1990) is a Mexican professional footballer who last played for the Monterrey Flash in the Major Arena Soccer League. In the past he has played for Juárez, Murciélagos and Irapuato of Ascenso MX.
