= Ángel Partida =

Mexican footballer (born 1989)

Ángel Gustavo Partida Arévalo (born 15 March 1989) is a Mexican former professional footballer who last played for Loros de la Universidad de Colima.
