= Jorge Amador =

Mexican footballer (born 1991)

Personal information
- Full name: Jorge Alexis Amador Castellanos
- Date of birth: 8 December 1991 (age 34)
- Place of birth: Manzanillo, Colima, Mexico
- Height: 1.74 m (5 ft 9 in)
- Position: Forward

Senior career*
| Years | Team | Apps | (Gls) |
| 2007–2010 | Manzanillo | 28 | (7) |
| 2008–2009 | → Conejos de Tuxpan (loan) | 31 | (14) |
| 2010–2017 | U. de C. | 114 | (47) |
- * Club domestic league appearances and goals as of 16:46 UTC, 27 October 2022

Jorge Alexis Amador Castellanos is a Mexican footballer who last played for Loros de la Universidad de Colima. He was born on December 8, 1991, in Manzanillo, Colima. His position is forward.
