= Guamúchil =

City in the Mexican state of Sinaloa

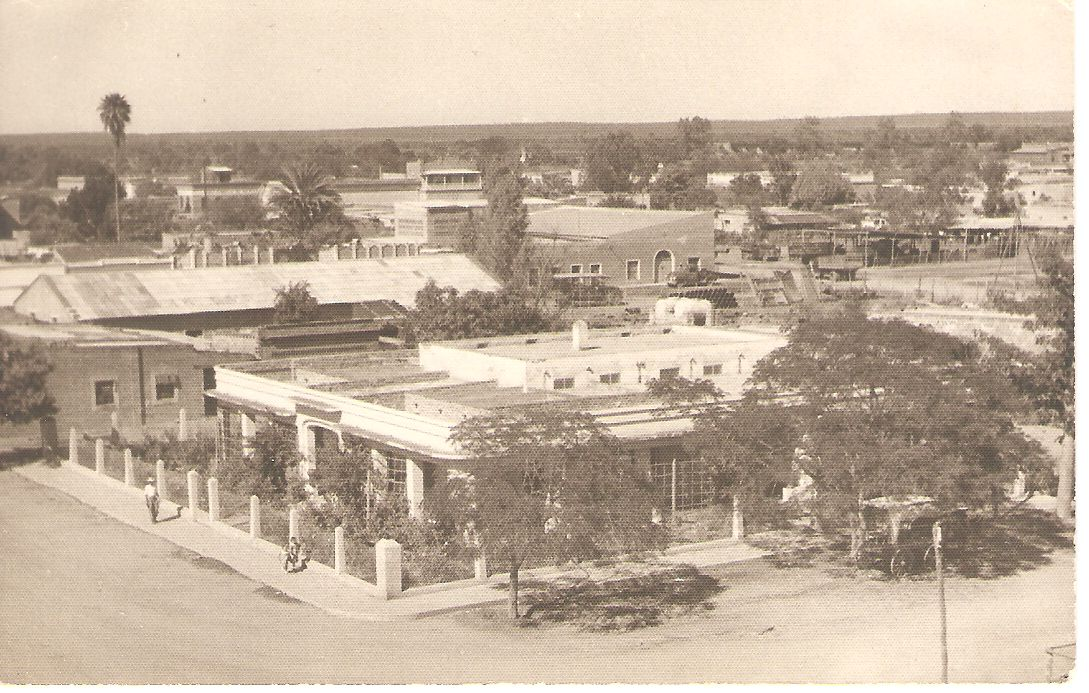

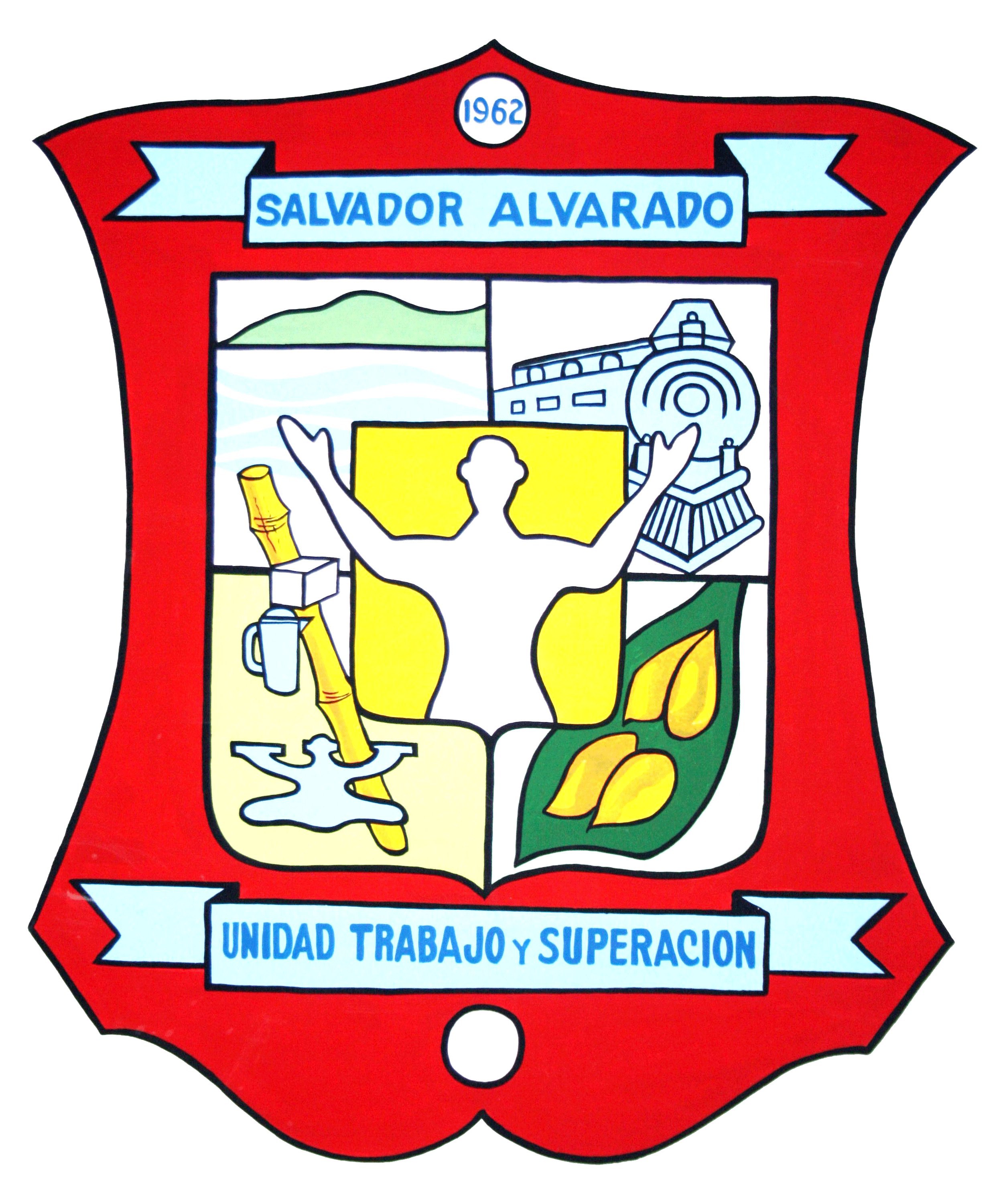
- Seal

- Location in Mexico Guamúchil (Mexico)
- Coordinates: 25°27′50″N 108°4′46″W
- Country: Mexico
- State: Sinaloa
- Municipality: Salvador Alvarado

Government
  - Mayor: Armando Camacho Aguilar (Morena)
- Elevation: 50 m (160 ft)

Population (2010)
  - Total: 72,500
- Time zone: UTC-7 (Mountain Standard Time)
- Postal code: 81400

Guamúchil (gwam-OO-cheel, US: /ɡwɑːˈmuːtʃil/, Spanish: [ɡwaˈmutʃil]) is a city located in the state of Sinaloa in Northwestern Mexico. It is located 100 km north of Culiacán, the capital of Sinaloa. The city serves as the seat of the municipality of Salvador Alvarado and is the economic and sociocultural center of the Évora Valley Region, named after the local Évora river. In 2010, the city had a population of around 72,500 inhabitants. It is the fifth-largest city in the state in population after Culiacán, Mazatlán, Los Mochis and Guasave.

== Municipal logo ==
The municipal logo consists of:

1. Left top: the Mochomo mountain and the Evora River referring to its region
2. Left bottom: the primary elements used in commerce relating to politics, social and cultural life
3. Right top: the pacific railroad track that initiated the communication for progress in that area
4. Right bottom: the chickpea as the main product in the region along with cheese and wool.
5. Center: a man with open arms towards progress.

== Geography ==
=== Climate ===
Guamúchil has a hot-type semi-arid or steppe climate (BSh) under the Köppen climate classification, with a mean annual precipitation of 593 millimetres (23.3 in) and a mean annual temperature of 25.1 °C (77.2 °F).

Climate data for Guamuchil (1951–2010)
Month	Jan	Feb	Mar	Apr	May	Jun	Jul	Aug	Sep	Oct	Nov	Dec	Year
Record high °C (°F)	41.0 (105.8)	40.5 (104.9)	39.5 (103.1)	42.0 (107.6)	44.5 (112.1)	45.0 (113.0)	43.5 (110.3)	46.0 (114.8)	43.5 (110.3)	44.0 (111.2)	39.5 (103.1)	41.5 (106.7)	46.0 (114.8)
Mean daily maximum °C (°F)	27.6 (81.7)	28.6 (83.5)	30.3 (86.5)	33.1 (91.6)	35.3 (95.5)	36.2 (97.2)	35.6 (96.1)	34.9 (94.8)	34.9 (94.8)	34.8 (94.6)	31.9 (89.4)	28.4 (83.1)	32.6 (90.7)
Daily mean °C (°F)	19.3 (66.7)	19.8 (67.6)	21.2 (70.2)	23.9 (75.0)	26.6 (79.9)	29.7 (85.5)	29.8 (85.6)	29.3 (84.7)	29.3 (84.7)	27.9 (82.2)	23.7 (74.7)	20.1 (68.2)	25.1 (77.2)
Mean daily minimum °C (°F)	11.1 (52.0)	11.1 (52.0)	12.1 (53.8)	14.7 (58.5)	18.0 (64.4)	23.1 (73.6)	24.0 (75.2)	23.7 (74.7)	23.7 (74.7)	20.9 (69.6)	15.6 (60.1)	11.8 (53.2)	17.5 (63.5)
Record low °C (°F)	0.0 (32.0)	−0.5 (31.1)	1.5 (34.7)	5.5 (41.9)	2.0 (35.6)	12.5 (54.5)	7.0 (44.6)	6.5 (43.7)	15.5 (59.9)	9.0 (48.2)	2.0 (35.6)	0.5 (32.9)	−0.5 (31.1)
Average precipitation mm (inches)	20.5 (0.81)	9.0 (0.35)	4.3 (0.17)	1.2 (0.05)	5.3 (0.21)	14.9 (0.59)	139.1 (5.48)	181.1 (7.13)	126.0 (4.96)	48.5 (1.91)	25.6 (1.01)	17.0 (0.67)	592.5 (23.33)
Average precipitation days (≥ 0.1 mm)	2.6	1.7	0.7	0.3	0.5	2.3	13.4	14.5	9.8	4.1	1.7	2.2	53.8
Source: Servicio Meteorologico Nacional

== Economy ==
Trade is a very important part for the economy of this city. There are large grain storage warehouses for sale and use. Agriculture is one of the main sources of income in the area, and different types of foods are grown but it is mainly corn and tomato.

This city can produce more than 15 types of different crops. Many basic for Regional Agro-industry and for domestic and international markets, such as safflower, wheat, soybeans, corn, sorghum, vegetables, chickpeas, fruits and grasses among others.

== Notable people ==
Guamúchil is the birthplace of boxer Carlos Cuadras, singer Ana Gabriel, artist Ariel Camacho and Miss México World 2009 Perla Beltrán and Kevin Alejandro Garcia Bojorquez.
