= C.D. De los Altos =

Club Deportivo De Los Altos
- Full name: Club Deportivo Yahualica De Los Altos
- Nicknames: Deportivo Altos, Altos
- Founded: July 2011
- Ground: Estadio Las Ánimas; Yahualica de Gonzalez Gallo, Jalisco
- Capacity: 8,500
- Manager: (Mexico) Juventino Mercado
- League: Liga Premier de Ascenso
- Website: https://web.archive.org/web/20120425152855/http://www.cdaltos.com/

Club Deportivo Yahualica De Los Altos is a football team that currently playing in the Second Division and Third Division of Mexico. is held in the city of Yahualica de Gonzalez Gallo, Jalisco, Mexico. They play in their stadium Las Ánimas with capacity for 10 thousand spectators. Club Deportivo de Los Altos play in the Apertura 2011 y Clausura 2012 tournaments, they will compete in Grupo 1 of the Liga Premier de Asenso of the Segunda División de México.

Club of Los Altos as it is commonly known started as a recently project, emerging from private initiative to promote the sport in the area of the highlands of Jalisco, (Altos de Jalisco) since the area did not have professional football. The creation of the Club caused players to integrate from surrounding cities and even other states, giving new players a chance to prove his talent. The public responded well to the club showing this in local games in which up to 3500 spectators attend.

== History ==
Club Deportivo de los Altos is a new club. They were including in the División in 2011 as part of its restructure.

Club Deportivo De Los Altos founded (July 1, 2011) for private initiative of some citizens of Yahualica de Gonzalez Gallo, beginning as an idea since 2010 which has already started to build the facility, the project maturing later and the idea start to be complete in January 2011 as they were finishing facilities, club members got in touch with what in the future would be the coaching, (Mora Guzmán Jesús Octavio) a staff was formed and they approached the Femexfut (Federación Mexicana de Fútbol) to formalize the situation.

The name CLUB DEPORTIVO DE LOS ALTOS was unanimous decision of the partners, because the name covers a large area of Jalisco where people share a big taste for the sport of football.

The creation of the football teams of the Third and Second Division in the town of Yahualica de Gonzalez Gallo, with its stadium capacity for 10 thousand spectators was because the area is great for football enthusiasts, municipalities also attend as spectators from: Mexticacán, Nochistlan, Tepatitlan De Morelos, Cañadas de Obregón, Teocaltiche, etc. Creating an attendance increasing with every game they play.

Club Deportivo Deportivo Los Altos, despite being a young team, have shown with each passing day be a team of high level, proven by the results published by the Femexfut.

Information is just coming out so more information will be provided as it comes out.

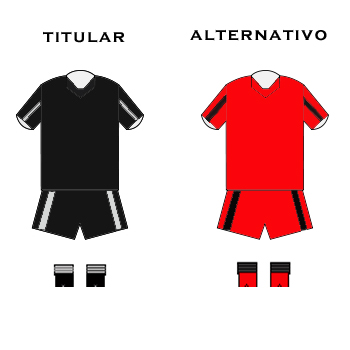
Uniforms BLACK-Home / RED-Away

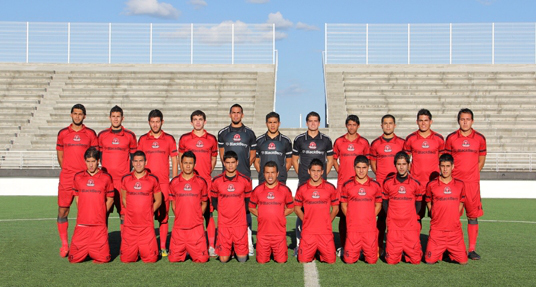
Second Division players, CD. Altos

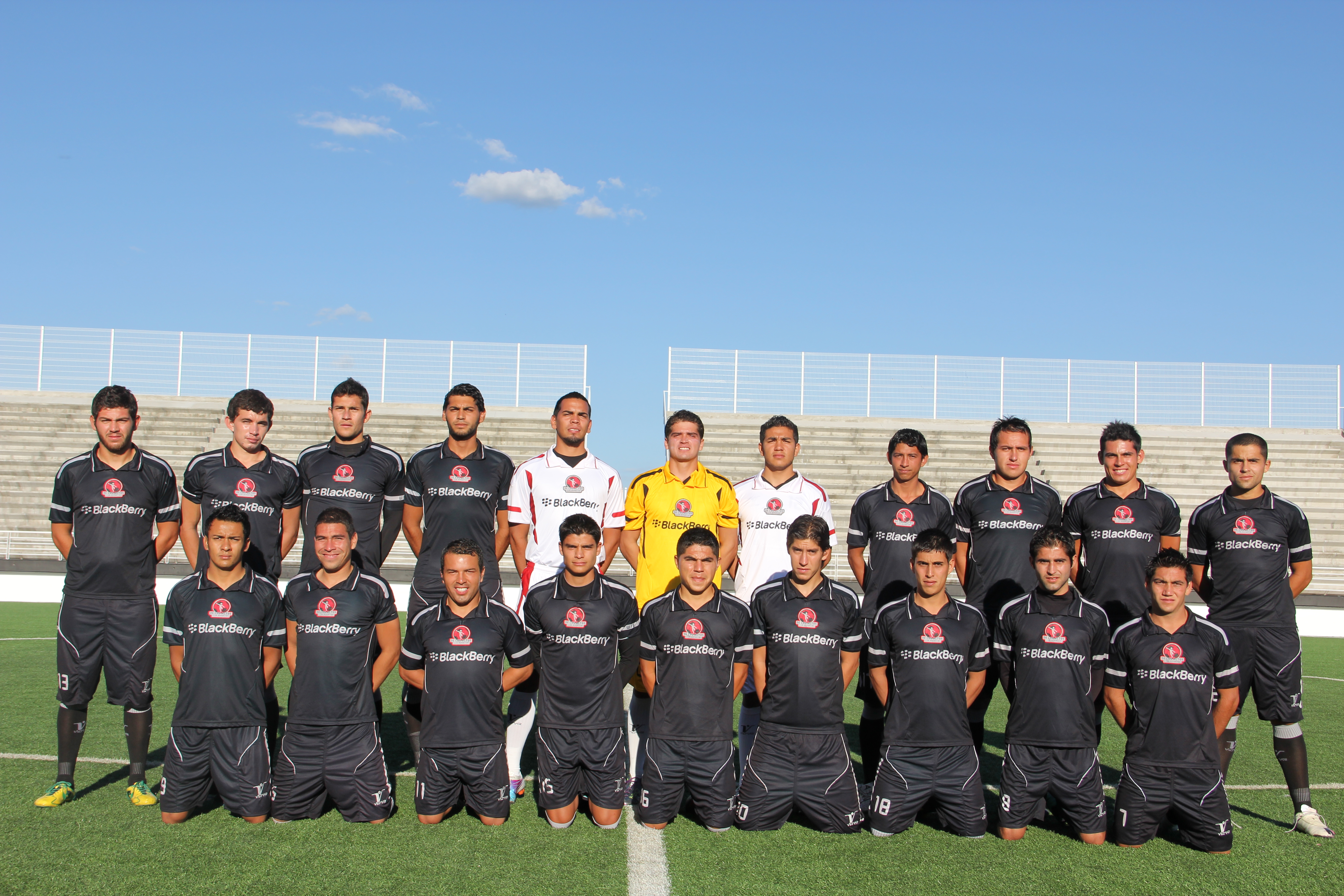
Second Division players, CD. Altos

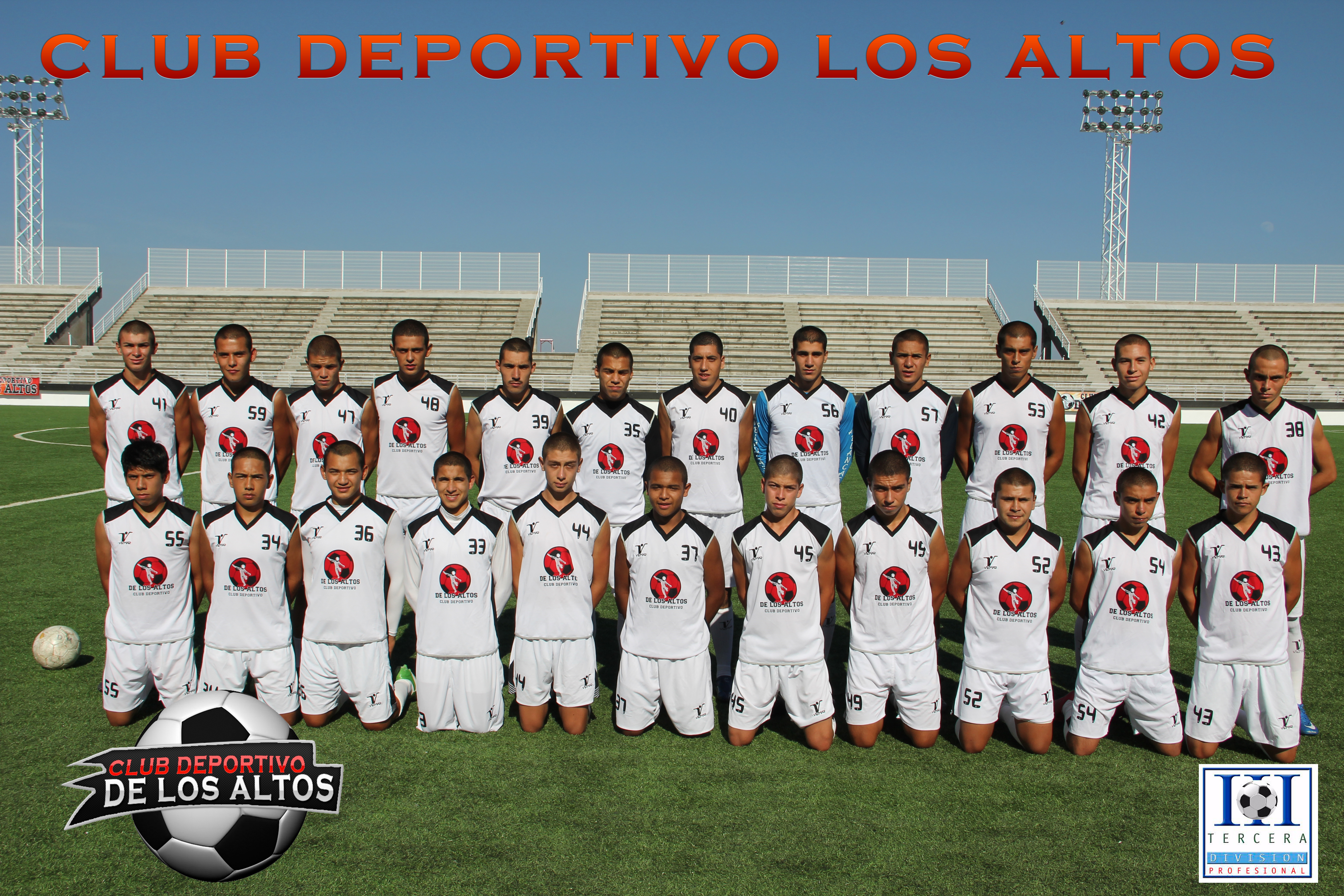
Third Division players Division

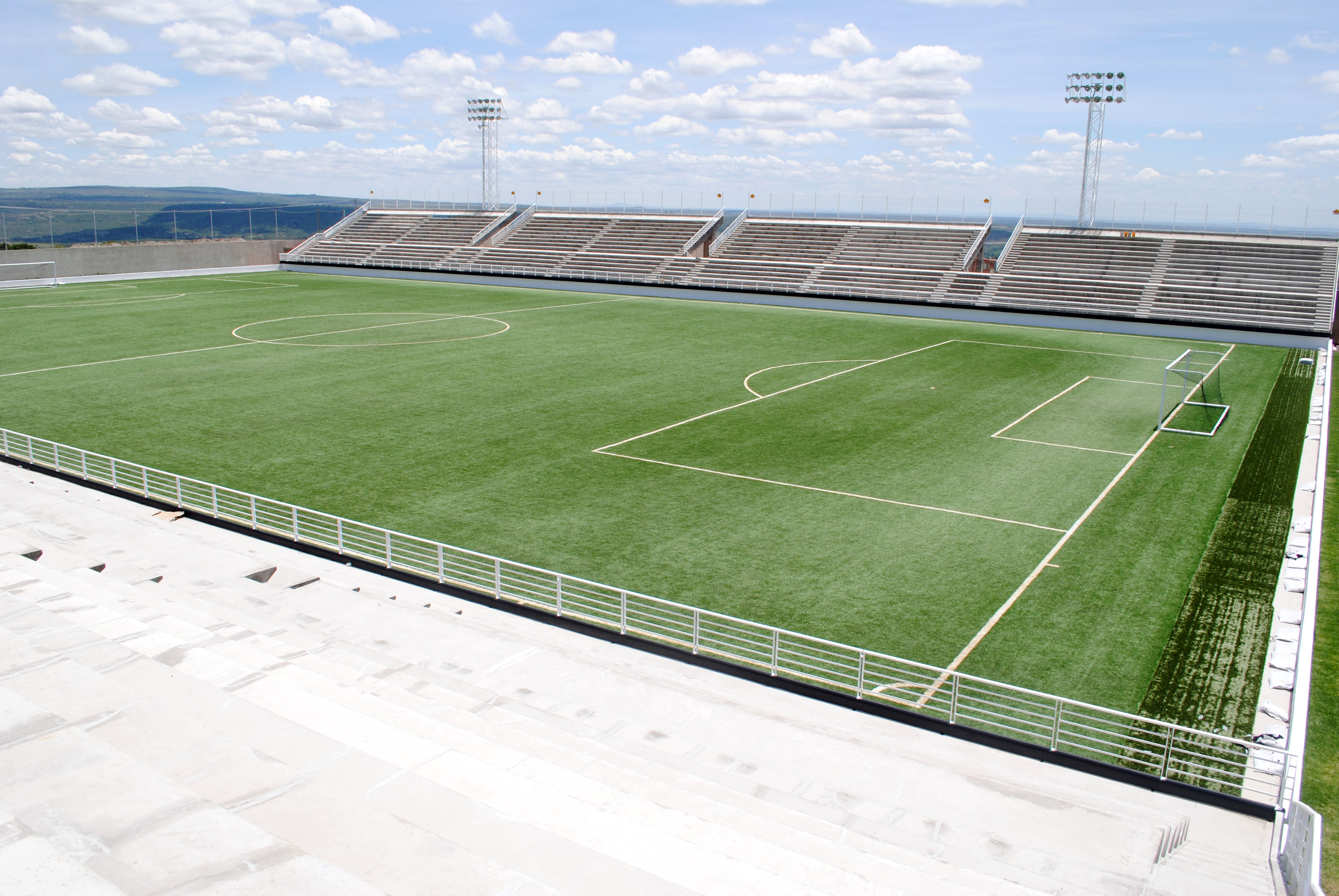
Facilities Club Deportivo Yahualica de los Altos

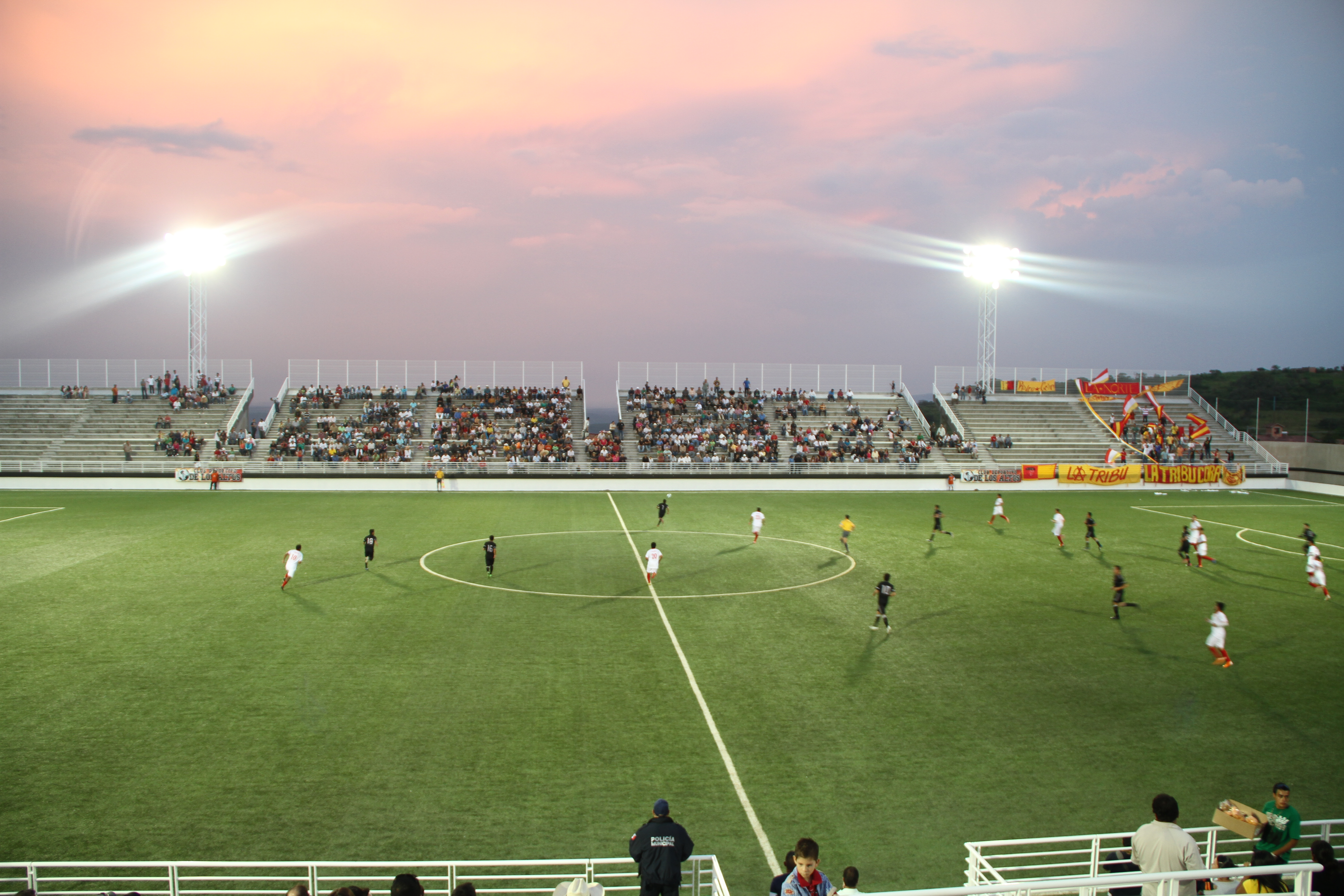
View of the Club During a Game Vs. Coras de Tepic

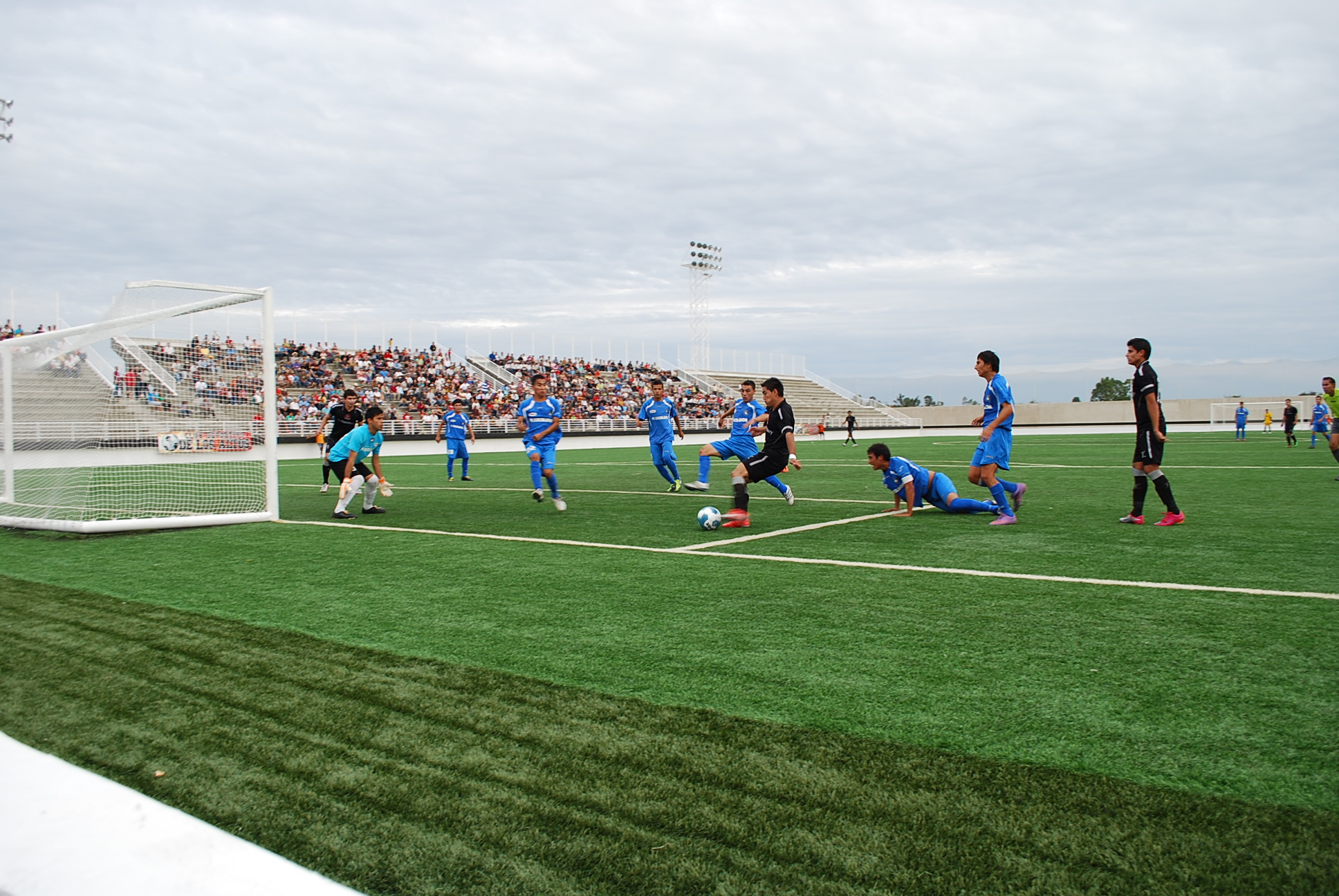
View of the Club During a Game Vs. F.C. Exelcior

== Head coaches and Staff ==
Second Division

NAME	PLACE
Mora Guzmán Jesús Octavio	Head coach
Jiménez Martínez Arturo	Medic
Limón Limón Francisco José	Medic
Parra López Hugo Adrián	Physical trainer
Espinoza Vela Arturo Javier	Coach assistant
Gallo Salazar Víctor	General assistant

Second Division Full Roster

NAME	Position
#12 Yobani Acosta Ibarra #24 Josafat Neftali Marquez Garibay ||KEP
#4 Fernando Martinez Duran #6 Juan Ramon Zazueta Ortiz #26 Luis Alberto Hernandez Ruiz #58 Jorge Alexis Lopez Rosales ||DEF
#7 Omar Heriberto Plascencia Nery #8 Ramon Antonio Avilez Felix #10 Miguel Angel Vallejo Navarro #11 Juan Manuel Rosales Ibarra||MED
#13 Angel Gustavo Partida Arevalo #20 Luis Enrique Romero Heredia #21 Eduardo Alberto Tinajero Navarro #56 Ricardo Gutierrez Ceballos ||MED
#16 Marcelo Eduardo Aguas Villarea #22 Jesus Eduardo Cota López #23 Oscar Alejandro Urzua Rivas #25 Vihanney Hiram Ruiz Mendez #20 Christian Chaney	DEL

== Stadium ==
=== Stadium las animas ===
From its beginnings the Club Deportivo De Los Altos exercised at the new stadium Las Ánimas with a capacity of 8,500 spectators in the town of Yahualica de Gonzalez Gallo, Jalisco, located at: Km 4.5 Carretera Yahualica - Teocaltiche; Once the stadium was finished immediately the club started working on it.

The facilities include a gym, recreational areas, and its own clubhouse inhabited by the team players.
