= 2011–12 Liga Premier de Ascenso season =

Liga Premier de Ascenso
- Season: 2011–12
- Dates: 12 August 2011 – 20 May 2012
- Champions: Apertura: Tulancingo; Clausura; Tulancingo
- Promoted: Tecamachalco
- Relegated: San Miguel F.C. Caudillos
- Stats are from the regular season only

The 2011–12 Liga Premier de Ascenso season was split in two tournaments Apertura and Clausura. Liga Premier was the third-tier football league of Mexico. The season was played between 12 August 2011 and 20 May 2012.

== Teams ==
=== Group 1 ===
Location of teams in the 2011–12 LPA Group 1

Club	City	Stadium	Capacity
Águilas Reales	Zacatecas City, Zacatecas	Francisco Villa	14,000
Bravos	Nuevo Laredo, Tamaulipas	Unidad Deportiva Benito Juárez	5,000
Cachorros UdeG	Guadalajara, Jalisco	Jalisco	55,020
Chivas Rayadas	Zapopan, Jalisco	Verde Valle	800
Coras de Tepic	Tepic, Nayarit	Arena Cora	12,271
Deportivo Guamúchil	Guamúchil, Sinaloa	Coloso del Dique	5,000
Dorados UACH	Chihuahua City, Chihuahua	Olímpico Universitario José Reyes Baeza	22,000
Excélsior	Salinas Victoria, Nuevo León	Centro Deportivo Soriana	2,000
Loros UdeC	Colima City, Colima	Estadio Olímpico Universitario de Colima	11,812
Deportivo Los Altos	Yahualica, Jalisco	Las Ánimas	8,500
Real Saltillo Soccer	Saltillo, Coahuila	Estadio Olímpico Francisco I. Madero	7,000
Tampico Madero	Tampico Madero, Tamaulipas	Tamaulipas	19,667
Unión de Curtidores	León, Guanajuato	La Martinica	11,000
U.A. Tamaulipas	Ciudad Victoria, Tamaulipas	Eugenio Alvizo Porras	5,000
Vaqueros	Tonalá, Jalisco	Revolución Mexicana	4,000

=== Group 2 ===
Location of teams in the 2011–12 LPA Group 2

Club	City	Stadium	Capacity
Albinegros de Orizaba	Orizaba, Veracruz	Socum	7,000
Ballenas Galeana Morelos	Xochitepec, Morelos	Mariano Matamoros	16,000
Cruz Azul Jasso	Jasso, Hidalgo	10 de Diciembre	7,761
Cuautitlán	Cuautitlán, State of Mexico	Alberto Pérez Navarro	3,000
Guerreros de Acapulco	Acapulco, Guerrero	Unidad Deportiva Acapulco	13,000
Inter Playa	Playa del Carmen, Quintana Roo	Unidad Deportiva Mario Villanueva Madrid	7,500
Lozaro	Oaxtepec, Morelos	Centro Vacacional IMSS	9,000
Ocelotes UNACH	Tapachula, Chiapas	Olímpico de Tapachula	11,000
Patriotas de Córdoba	Córdoba, Veracruz	Rafael Murillo Vidal	3,800
Potros UAEM	Toluca, State of Mexico	Alberto "Chivo" Córdoba	32,603
San Miguel Caudillos	San Miguel de Allende, Guanajuato	José María "Capi" Correa	4,000
Querétaro "B"	Querétaro City, Querétaro	Unidad Deportiva La Cañada	2,000
Tecamachalco	Ciudad Nezahualcóyotl, State of Mexico	Neza 86	20,000
Tulancingo	Tulancingo, Hidalgo	Primero de Mayo	2,500
Veracruz "B"	Veracruz, Veracruz	Luis "Pirata" Fuente	28,703

== Torneo Apertura ==
=== Regular season ===
==== Group 1 ====
===== Standings =====
Pos	Team	Pld	W	D	L	GF	GA	GD	Pts	Qualification or relegation
1	Chivas Rayadas	14	10	3	1	27	6	+21	39	Promotion play-offs
2	Deportivo Los Altos	14	7	7	0	34	12	+22	34	Promotion play-offs
3	Deportivo Guamúchil	14	7	5	2	26	9	+17	30	Promotion play-offs
4	Loros UdeC	14	8	3	3	22	15	+7	30	Promotion play-offs
5	Unión de Curtidores	14	7	5	2	16	13	+3	28	Promotion play-offs
6	Coras Tepic	14	5	5	4	22	20	+2	23	Promotion play-offs
7	Tampico Madero	14	4	5	5	20	20	0	21	Promotion play-offs
8	U.A. Tamaulipas	14	5	3	6	8	15	−7	20	Promotion play-offs
9	Dorados UACH	14	5	3	6	24	17	+7	19	
10	Excélsior	14	6	0	8	18	19	−1	19	
11	Vaqueros	14	2	8	4	14	19	−5	15	
12	Águilas Reales de Zacatecas	14	2	5	7	10	20	−10	15	
13	Real Saltillo Soccer	14	2	5	7	15	33	−18	15	
14	Bravos de Nuevo Laredo	14	1	5	8	10	32	−22	10	
15	Cachorros UdeG	14	2	2	10	12	28	−16	9	

Source: Segunda División FMF

===== Results =====
Home \ Away	ARZ	BRA	CUG	CHI	COR	DFU	EXC	GUA	LUC	ALT	RSS	TAM	UDC	UAT	VAQ
Águilas Reales	—	—	2–0	0–2	1–3	1–1	—	—	—	1–1	—	—	1–1	0–1	—
Bravos	0–1	—	2–2	—	—	—	0–1	—	2–5	—	1–1	2–2	—	—	—
Cachorros UdeG	—	—	—	2–1	—	4–2	—	—	—	0–3	—	—	0–0	1–2	0–1
Chivas Rayadas	—	3–1	—	—	—	2–0	—	1–0	—	1–1	—	—	4–0	1–1	1–0
Coras Tepic	—	0–0	4–1	1–3	—	—	—	1–1	3–1	—	—	—	1–0	—	2–2
Dorados UACH	—	4–0	—	—	1–1	—	—	1–2	0–0	1–2	—	2–1	—	3–0	5–0
Excélsior	5–1	—	1–0	0–2	1–2	1–0	—	—	—	—	3–0	—	0–1	—	—
Guamúchil	1–0	5–0	4–0	—	—	—	4–0	—	2–0	—	3–1	2–2	—	—	—
Loros UdeC	3–1	—	1–0	0–0	—	—	2–1	—	—	—	3–1	2–1	—	—	—
Dep. Los Altos	—	6–0	—	—	4–1	—	3–2	0–0	2–2	—	—	1–1	—	3–0	2–2
Real Saltillo S.	0–0	—	3–2	0–4	1–0	0–3	—	—	—	0–5	—	—	2–2	—	—
Tampico Madero	2–1	—	2–0	0–2	3–3	—	2–0	—	—	—	3–2	—	0–1	—	—
Unión de Curtidores	—	1–0	—	—	—	3–1	—	2–1	2–1	1–1	—	—	—	1–0	1–1
U.A. Tamaulipas	—	0–1	—	—	1–0	—	0–3	0–0	0–1	—	1–1	1–0	—	—	1–0
Vaqueros	0–0	1–1	—	—	—	—	2–0	1–1	0–1	—	3–3	1–1	—	—	—

Source: Segunda División FMF
Legend: Blue = home team win; Yellow = draw; Red = away team win.

==== Group 2 ====
===== Standings =====
Pos	Team	Pld	W	D	L	GF	GA	GD	Pts	Qualification or relegation
1	Tulancingo	14	11	3	0	29	7	+22	39	Promotion play-offs
2	Tecamachalco	14	6	5	3	22	13	+9	29	Promotion play-offs
3	Inter Playa del Carmen	14	9	1	4	25	17	+8	29	Promotion play-offs
4	Potros UAEM	14	6	5	3	22	17	+5	29	Promotion play-offs
5	Albinegros de Orizaba	14	5	5	4	23	14	+9	25	Promotion play-offs
6	Lozaro	14	5	6	3	21	16	+5	23	Promotion play-offs
7	Ballenas Galeana Morelos	14	6	3	5	17	18	−1	23	Promotion play-offs
8	Cruz Azul Jasso	14	5	5	4	22	13	+9	22	Promotion play-offs
9	Guerreros de Acapulco	14	4	7	3	13	9	+4	22	
10	Cuautitlán	14	5	3	6	16	25	−9	21	
11	Ocelotes UNACH	14	4	4	6	21	24	−3	20	
12	Querétaro "B"	14	3	4	7	11	24	−13	16	
13	Veracruz "B"	14	3	2	9	16	32	−16	12	
14	San Miguel Caudillos	14	3	1	10	17	29	−12	10	
15	Patriotas de Córdoba	14	1	4	9	12	29	−17	9	

Source: Segunda División FMF

===== Results =====
Home \ Away	ALB	BGM	CAJ	CUA	GUE	IPC	LOZ	OUC	PAT	PUM	QUE	SMC	TEC	TUL	VER
Albinegros	—	1–2	0–1	—	1–1	1–0	—	—	4–0	0–0	—	3–1	1–1	—	—
Ballenas Galeana	—	—	0–0	—	—	—	2–1	1–2	—	0–2	—	3–2	0–2	—	—
Cruz Azul Jasso	—	—	—	—	—	—	—	5–0	—	0–0	4–3	1–2	2–1	—	5–0
Cuautitlán	0–3	1–1	1–0	—	1–0	1–3	—	—	—	—	2–0	—	—	0–4	—
Guerreros	—	1–1	0–0	—	—	—	1–0	—	2–0	1–2	—	3–0	—	—	—
Inter Playa	—	2–0	2–1	—	1–0	—	1–2	—	2–1	4–0	—	4–1	2–2	—	—
Lozaro	0–0	—	—	3–0	—	—	—	3–1	0–0	—	—	—	—	1–1	1–1
Ocelotes UNACH	3–3	—	—	2–3	0–1	1–2	—	—	—	—	4–1	—	—	0–2	3–1
Patriotas	—	0–1	2–1	1–1	—	—	—	0–3	—	2–4	—	—	1–1	3–4	1–2
Potros UAEM	—	—	—	2–2	—	—	2–2	1–1	—	—	—	2–0	0–2	—	3–0
Querétaro	2–1	1–3	1–1	—	2–2	2–1	0–0	—	0–0	1–4	—	—	0–1	—	—
San Miguel	—	—	—	0–2	—	—	1–2	1–1	4–1	—	0–1	—	—	1–2	3–1
Tecamachalco	—	—	—	4–1	0–0	—	2–3	0–0	—	—	—	3–1	—	0–2	3–0
Tulancingo	1–0	1–0	1–1	—	0–0	5–0	—	—	—	2–0	2–0	—	—	—	—
Veracruz	2–5	2–3	—	2–1	1–1	0–1	—	—	—	—	3–0	—	—	1–2	—

Source: Segunda División FMF
Legend: Blue = home team win; Yellow = draw; Red = away team win.

=== Liguilla ===
The eight best teams of each group play two games against each other on a home-and-away basis. The higher seeded teams play on their home field during the second leg. The winner of each match up is determined by aggregate score. In the Round of 8, quarterfinals and semifinals, if the two teams are tied on aggregate the higher seeded team advances. In the final, if the two teams are tied after both legs, the match goes to extra time and, if necessary, a penalty shoot-out.

Round of 16
1	Tulancingo	2	6	8
16	U.A. Tamaulipas	0	0	0
8	Potros UAEM	2	2	4
9	Unión de Curtidores	0	2	2
2	Chivas Rayadas	0	3	3
15	Tampico Madero	1	1	2
7	Inter Playa (s.)	2	0	2
10	Albinegros	0	2	2
4	Deportivo Guamúchil	2	2	4
13	Ballenas Galeana	1	1	2
5	Loros UdeC	1	2	3
12	Coras Tepic	0	0	0
3	Deportivo Los Altos (s.)	0	1	1
14	Cruz Azul Jasso	1	0	1
6	Tecamachalco	1	3	4
11	Lozaro	2	1	3

Quarter-finals
1	Tulancingo	2	5	7
8	Potros UAEM	0	2	2
2	Chivas Rayadas	1	1	2
7	Inter Playa	3	1	4
4	Deportivo Guamúchil	3	0	3
5	Loros UdeC	4	1	5
3	Deportivo Los Altos	0	0	0
6	Tecamachalco	1	1	2

Semi-finals
1	Tulancingo	1	4	5
7	Inter Playa	2	0	2
5	Loros UdeC	1	1	2
6	Tecamachalco	2	2	4

Final
1	Tulancingo	1	2	3
6	Tecamachalco	1	0	1

==== Round of 16 ====
Team 1	Agg.	Team 2	1st leg	2nd leg
Tulancingo	8–0	U.A. Tamaulipas	2–0	6–0
Potros UAEM	4–2	Unión de Curtidores	2–0	2–2
Chivas Rayadas	3–2	Tampico Madero	0–1	3–1
Inter Playa (s.)	2–2	Albinegros de Orizaba	2–0	0–2
Deportivo Guamúchil	4–2	Ballenas Galeana Morelos	2–1	2–1
Loros UdeC	3–0	Coras Tepic	1–0	2–0
Deportivo Los Altos (s.)	1–1	Cruz Azul Jasso	0–1	1–0
Tecamachalco	4–3	Lozaro	1–2	3–1

===== First leg =====
23 November 2011	Lozaro	2–1	Tecamachalco	Oaxtepec
13:00	Saldaña 24'; Fuentes 55'	Report	Fernández 29'	Stadium: Estadio Centro Vacacional IMSS; Attendance: 100; Referee: Alejandro Camacho Silva

23 November 2011	Albinegros de Orizaba	0–2	Inter Playa	Orizaba
15:00		Report	Álvarez 31', 39'	Stadium: Estadio Socum; Attendance: 200; Referee: Jonathan Hernández Juárez

23 November 2011	Cruz Azul Jasso	1–0	Deportivo Los Altos	Ciudad Cooperativa Cruz Azul
15:00	Wbias 66'	Report		Stadium: Estadio 10 de Diciembre; Attendance: 400; Referee: Henry Ulises The Ávila

23 November 2011	Unión de Curtidores	0–2	Potros UAEM	León
19:15		Report	Maldonado 66', 75'	Stadium: Estadio La Martinica; Attendance: 500; Referee: César Alfredo Venegas García

23 November 2011	Tampico Madero	1–0	Chivas Rayadas	Tampico and Ciudad Madero
20:30	Céspedes 90+3'	Report		Stadium: Estadio Tamaulipas; Attendance: 8,000; Referee: Luis Darién Morán Donías

23 November 2011	Coras Tepic	0–1	Loros UdeC	Tepic
20:30		Report	Vizcarra 74'	Stadium: Arena Cora; Attendance: 4,000; Referee: Marco Antonio Ortíz Nava

24 November 2011	U.A. Tamaulipas	0–2	Tulancingo	Ciudad Victoria
19:00		Report	Castillo 54'; Meráz 57'	Stadium: Estadio Profesor Eugenio Alvizo Porras; Attendance: 250; Referee: Rodrigo Cervantes Muñóz

24 November 2011	Deportivo Guamúchil	2–1	Ballenas Galeana	Guamúchil
20:05	Rodríguez 12'; Ibarra 85'	Report	Gómez 41'	Stadium: Coloso del Dique; Attendance: 3,000; Referee: Diego Montaño Robles

===== Second leg =====
26 November 2011	Chivas Rayadas	3–1 (3–2 agg.)	Tampico Madero	Zapopan
11:00	Verduzco 14'; Nieblas 30'; Ríos 44'	Report	Soto 76'	Stadium: Estadio Omnilife; Attendance: 300; Referee: Luis Miguel Tapia González

26 November 2011	Potros UAEM	2–2 (4–2 agg.)	Unión de Curtidores	Toluca
12:00	Alvarado 15'; Maldonado 52'	Report	Ayala 6'; Gómez 57'	Stadium: Estadio Universitario Alberto "Chivo" Córdoba; Attendance: 500; Referee: Julio César Mondragón Robles

26 November 2011	Tecamachalco	3–1 (4–3 agg.)	Lozaro	Ciudad Nezahualcóyotl
13:00	Fernández 9', 26'; San Román 13'	Report	Ramírez 3'	Stadium: Estadio Neza 86; Attendance: 300; Referee: Emerson Gustavo Zamora Ramírez

26 November 2011	Inter Playa	0–2 (2–2 agg.)	Albinegros de Orizaba	Playa del Carmen
15:00		Report	Hernández 10'; Rivera 36'	Stadium: Unidad Deportiva Mario Villanueva Madrid; Attendance: 500; Referee: Gilberto Alvarado Farjat

26 November 2011	Deportivo Los Altos	1–0 (1–1 agg.)	Cruz Azul Jasso	Yahualica
16:00	Tovar 49'	Report		Stadium: Estadio Las Ánimas; Attendance: 2,500; Referee: Edgar Homero Ruíz Díaz

26 November 2011	Loros UdeC	2–0 (3–0 agg.)	Coras Tepic	Colima City
20:00	Ramírez 16'; Vizcarra 87'	Report		Stadium: Estadio Olímpico Universitario de Colima; Attendance: 300; Referee: Jorge Adán Tonix Vázquez

27 November 2011	Tulancingo	6–0 (8-0 agg.)	U.A. Tamaulipas	Tulancingo
12:00	Meráz 6', 14'; Cortés 28'; Beltrán 38', 68'; Velázquez 89'	Report		Stadium: Estadio Primero de Mayo; Attendance: 1,000; Referee: Marco Antonio Hernández Ramírez

27 November 2011	Ballenas Galeana	1–2 (2–4 agg.)	Deportivo Guamúchil	Xochitepec
15:30	Catalán 76'	Report	Romero 22', 60'	Stadium: Estadio Mariano Matamoros; Attendance: 5,000; Referee: Jesús Bisguerra Mendiola

==== Quarter-finals ====
Team 1	Agg.	Team 2	1st leg	2nd leg
Tulancingo	7–2	Potros UAEM	2–0	5–2
Chivas Rayadas	2–4	Inter Playa	1–3	1–1
Deportivo Guamúchil	3–5	Loros UdeC	3–4	0–1
Deportivo Los Altos	0–2	Tecamachalco	0–1	0–1

===== First leg =====
30 November 2011	Tecamachalco	1–0	Deportivo Los Altos	Ciudad Nezahualcóyotl
15:00	Burciaga 38'	Report		Stadium: Estadio Neza 86; Attendance: 200; Referee: Jesús Bisguerra Mendiola

30 November 2011	Inter Playa	3–1	Chivas Rayadas	Playa del Carmen
20:00	Álvarez 47'; Ballesteros 56'; Ramos 85'	Report	Zaldívar 20'	Stadium: Unidad Deportiva Mario Villanueva Madrid; Attendance: 3,000; Referee: Carlos Javier Ríos García

30 November 2011	Loros UdeC	4–3	Deportivo Guamúchil	Colima City
20:00	Vizcarra 15', 20'; Ruíz 77'; Sánchez 89'	Report	Alpuche 52', 64'; Ayón 79'	Stadium: Estadio Olímpico Universitario de Colima; Attendance: 1,000; Referee: Jonathan Hernandez Juárez

1 December 2011	Potros UAEM	0–2	Tulancingo	Toluca
19:00		Report	Meráz 9'; Díaz 71'	Stadium: Estadio Universitario Alberto "Chivo" Córdoba; Attendance: 300; Referee: Emerson Gustavo Zamora Ramírez

===== Second leg =====
3 December 2011	Chivas Rayadas	1–1 (2–4 agg.)	Inter Playa	Zapopan
10:00	Perales 16'	Report	Ramos 75'	Stadium: Estadio Omnilife; Attendance: 200; Referee: Edgar Homero Ruiz Díaz

3 December 2011	Deportivo Los Altos	0–1 (0–2 agg.)	Tecamachalco	Yahualica
16:00		Report	Fernández 90+3'	Stadium: Estadio Las Ánimas; Attendance: 1,500; Referee: Rodrigo Cervantes Muñoz

3 December 2011	Deportivo Guamúchil	0–1 (3–5 agg.)	Loros UdeC	Guamúchil
20:05		Report	Ruíz 30'	Stadium: Coloso del Dique; Attendance: 2,000; Referee: Henry Ulises The Avila

4 December 2011	Tulancingo	5–2 (7–2 agg.)	Potros UAEM	Tulancingo
12:00	Cortés 58', 63', 79'; Meráz 61', 75'	Report	Maldonado 50'; Vilchis 55'	Stadium: Estadio Primero de Mayo; Attendance: 1,000; Referee: Julio César Mondragón Robles

==== Semi-finals ====
Team 1	Agg.	Team 2	1st leg	2nd leg
Tulancingo	5–2	Inter Playa	1–2	4–0
Loros UdeC	2–4	Tecamachalco	1–2	1–2

===== First leg =====
7 December 2011	Tecamachalco	2–1	Loros UdeC	Ciudad Nezahualcóyotl
15:00	Burciaga 2', 62'	Report	Sánchez 31'	Stadium: Estadio Neza 86; Attendance: 500; Referee: Jesús Bisguerra Mendiola

8 December 2011	Inter Playa	2–1	Tulancingo	Playa del Carmen
20:00	Tello 33'; Noyola 50'	Report	Meráz 13'	Stadium: Unidad Deportiva Mario Villanueva Madrid; Attendance: 4,000; Referee: Carlos Javier Ríos García

===== Second leg =====
10 December 2011	Loros UdeC	1–2 (2–4 agg.)	Tecamachalco	Colima City
20:00	Vizcarra 50'	Report	Fernández 29'; Quintana 90'	Stadium: Estadio Olímpico Universitario de Colima; Attendance: 4,000; Referee: Edgar Homero Ruíz Díaz

11 December 2011	Tulancingo	4–0 (5–2 agg.)	Inter Playa del Carmen	Tulancingo
12:00	Meráz 10', 42', 48'; Cortés 46'	Report		Stadium: Estadio Primero de Mayo; Attendance: 1,500; Referee: Jorge Adán Tonix Vázquez

==== Final ====
Team 1	Agg.	Team 2	1st leg	2nd leg
Tulancingo	3–1	Tecamachalco	1–1	2–0

===== First leg =====
15 December 2011	Tecamachalco	1–1	Tulancingo	Ciudad Nezahualcóyotl
15:00	Burciaga 28'	Report	Cortés 16'	Stadium: Estadio Neza 86; Attendance: 2,500; Referee: Emerson Gustavo Zamora Ramírez

===== Second leg =====
18 December 2011	Tulancingo	2–0 (3–1 agg.)	Tecamachalco	Tulancingo
12:00	Meráz 49', 76'	Report		Stadium: Estadio Primero de Mayo; Attendance: 5,000; Referee: Edgar Homero Ruíz Díaz

Apertura 2012 winners

1st title

== Torneo Clausura ==
=== Regular season ===
==== Group 1 ====
===== Standings =====
Pos	Team	Pld	W	D	L	GF	GA	GD	Pts	Qualification or relegation
1	Deportivo Los Altos	14	8	4	2	25	16	+9	31	Promotion play-offs
2	Chivas Rayadas	14	8	2	4	26	14	+12	30	Promotion play-offs
3	Bravos de Nuevo Laredo	14	8	3	3	21	10	+11	30	Promotion play-offs
4	Dorados UACH	14	8	3	3	24	13	+11	28	Promotion play-offs
5	Coras Tepic	14	7	3	4	21	12	+9	26	Promotion play-offs
6	Loros UdeC (Note: Loros UdeC resigned to play the playoffs due to poor results in the last games of the regular season, the owner fired all the players.)	14	5	6	3	24	16	+8	26	
7	Tampico Madero	14	3	9	2	20	21	−1	25	Promotion play-offs
8	U.A. Tamaulipas	14	6	4	4	23	19	+4	24	Promotion play-offs
9	Unión de Curtidores	14	3	9	2	14	13	+1	24	Promotion play-offs
10	Deportivo Guamúchil	14	6	3	5	19	21	−2	23	
11	Vaqueros	14	2	5	7	10	17	−7	15	
12	Águilas Reales de Zacatecas	14	4	2	8	19	30	−11	15	
13	Cachorros UdeG	14	2	4	8	18	28	−10	13	
14	Real Saltillo Soccer	14	3	1	10	12	26	−14	10	
15	Excélsior	14	0	6	8	12	32	−20	7	

Source: Segunda División FMF

===== Results =====
Home \ Away	ARZ	BRA	CUG	CHI	COR	DFU	EXC	GUA	LUC	ALT	RSS	TAM	UDC	UAT	VAQ
Águilas Reales	—	0–2	—	—	—	—	5–2	0–1	2–2	—	2–1	1–2	—	—	2–1
Bravos	—	—	—	1–1	0–0	2–0	—	1–2	—	2–0	—	—	1–0	2–1	2–0
Cachorros UdeG	1–4	0–1	—	—	1–4	—	1–1	4–0	0–3	—	4–2	0–2	—	—	—
Chivas Rayadas	5–0	—	2–1	—	0–1	—	1–0	—	2–0	—	3–1	3–1	—	—	—
Coras Tepic	2–1	—	—	—	—	2–0	5–0	—	—	1–2	1–0	1–1	—	3–1	—
Dorados UACH	3–0	—	2–2	1–0	—	—	4–0	—	—	—	3–0	—	2–0	—	—
Excélsior	—	1–4	—	—	—	—	—	0–1	2–2	1–1	—	2–2	—	1–3	0–1
Guamúchil	—	—	—	2–0	1–0	2–3	—	—	—	0–1	—	—	1–1	1–1	3–0
Loros UdeC	—	2–2	—	—	3–0	2–3	—	4–1	—	0–1	—	—	0–0	2–1	0–0
Dep. Los Altos	5–1	—	4–2	3–2	—	0–0	—	—	—	—	2–0	—	1–1	—	—
Real Saltillo S.	—	1–0	—	—	—	—	0–0	3–1	0–2	—	—	3–0	—	1–2	0–4
Tampico Madero	—	2–1	—	—	—	0–0	—	3–3	2–2	2–2	—	—	—	1–1	1–1
Unión de Curtidores	1–1	—	1–1	1–1	1–0	—	2–2	—	—	—	2–0	1–1	—	—	—
U.A. Tamaulipas	2–0	—	2–1	1–3	—	3–1	—	—	—	4–1	—	—	1–1	—	—
Vaqueros	—	—	0–0	1–3	1–1	0–1	—	—	—	0–2	—	—	1–2	0–0	—

Source: Segunda División FMF
Legend: Blue = home team win; Yellow = draw; Red = away team win.

==== Group 2 ====
===== Standings =====
Pos	Team	Pld	W	D	L	GF	GA	GD	Pts	Qualification or relegation
1	Tulancingo	14	9	3	2	38	18	+20	35	Promotion play-offs
2	Tecamachalco	14	9	2	3	39	22	+17	34	Promotion play-offs
3	Albinegros de Orizaba	14	6	5	3	21	12	+9	27	Promotion play-offs
4	Ballenas Galeana Morelos	14	7	2	5	22	16	+6	27	Promotion play-offs
5	Ocelotes UNACH	14	8	0	6	30	20	+10	25	Promotion play-offs
6	Patriotas de Córdoba	14	6	3	5	16	22	−6	25	Promotion play-offs
7	Cruz Azul Jasso	14	7	2	5	20	17	+3	26	Promotion play-offs
8	Potros UAEM	14	6	3	5	24	21	+3	23	Promotion play-offs
9	Veracruz "B"	14	6	1	7	20	22	−2	21	
10	Lozaro	14	5	3	6	19	24	−5	20	
11	Inter Playa del Carmen	14	6	0	8	17	21	−4	19	
12	Guerreros de Acapulco	14	4	4	6	21	24	−3	17	
13	Cuautitlán	14	3	3	8	21	39	−18	14	
14	Querétaro "B"	14	2	4	8	9	20	−11	11	
15	San Miguel Caudillos	14	2	3	9	10	29	−19	9	Relegated to Liga de Nuevos Talentos

Source: Segunda División FMF

===== Results =====
Home \ Away	ALB	BGM	CAJ	CUA	GUE	IPC	LOZ	OUC	PAT	PUM	QUE	SMC	TEC	TUL	VER
Albinegros	—	—	—	1–1	—	—	2–0	4–0	—	—	0–0	—	—	2–0	1–0
Ballenas Galeana	1–2	—	—	0–1	2–0	2–0	—	—	3–0	—	0–0	—	—	1–3	0–0
Cruz Azul Jasso	3–2	1–3	—	3–2	3–0	3–1	—	—	1–0	—	0–1	—	—	2–2	—
Cuautitlán	—	—	—	—	—	—	1–3	2–5	2–4	2–4	—	4–1	4–3	—	1–3
Guerreros	2–2	—	—	0–0	—	0–1	—	2–3	—	—	3–1	—	3–3	2–4	5–1
Inter Playa	2–1	—	—	3–0	—	—	—	1–0	—	—	1–0	—	—	0–1	0–1
Lozaro	—	2–3	1–2	—	0–0	2–1	—	—	—	3–2	0–0	2–1	2–1	—	—
Ocelotes UNACH	—	3–0	2–0	—	—	—	4–2	—	4–0	4–1	—	1–2	1–2	—	—
Patriotas	0–0	—	—	—	3–1	2–0	2–0	—	—	—	0–0	0–0	—	—	—
Potros UAEM	2–1	0–0	1–0	—	0–1	2–0	—	—	1–1	—	2–2	—	—	1–2	—
Querétaro	—	—	—	0–0	—	—	—	1–0	—	—	—	1–2	—	1–2	1–3
San Miguel	—	—	—	0–2	—	—	1–2	1–1	4–1	—	0–1	—	—	1–2	3–1
Tecamachalco	1–1	4–2	1–2	—	—	6–3	—	—	4–0	3–2	2–0	—	—	—	—
Tulancingo	—	—	—	9–1	—	—	1–1	2–1	5–1	—	—	2–2	1–3	—	4–0
Veracruz	—	—	1–0	—	—	—	4–1	1–2	0–1	2–3	—	3–0	1–3	—	—

Source: Segunda División FMF
Legend: Blue = home team win; Yellow = draw; Red = away team win.

=== Liguilla ===
The eight best teams of each group play two games against each other on a home-and-away basis. The higher seeded teams play on their home field during the second leg. The winner of each match up is determined by aggregate score. In the Round of 8, quarterfinals and semifinals, if the two teams are tied on aggregate the higher seeded team advances. In the final, if the two teams are tied after both legs, the match goes to extra time and, if necessary, a penalty shoot-out.

Round of 16
1	Tulancingo	1	2	3
17	Potros UAEM	0	1	1
3	Deportivo Los Altos	0	2	2
15	Cruz Azul Jasso	2	1	3
6	Dorados UACH	2	4	6
12	Tampico Madero	0	0	0
7	Albinegros (s.)	1	1	2
11	Ocelotes UNACH	0	2	2
2	Tecamachalco	1	4	5
16	Unión de Curtidores	1	1	2
5	Bravos	0	2	2
13	Patriotas	2	1	3
4	Chivas Rayadas	2	3	5
14	U.A. Tamaulipas	1	0	1
8	Ballenas Galeana	0	6	6
9	Coras Tepic	2	0	2

Quarter-finals
1	Tulancingo (s.)	0	1	1
15	Cruz Azul Jasso	1	0	1
6	Dorados UACH	1	3	4
7	Albinegros	2	1	3
2	Tecamachalco	1	7	8
13	Patriotas	3	0	3
4	Chivas Rayadas	2	4	6
8	Ballenas Galeana	2	1	3

Semi-finals
1	Tulancingo	2	1	3
6	Dorados UACH	0	1	1
2	Tecamachalco	1	4	5
4	Chivas Rayadas	2	1	3

Final
1	Tulancingo	2	2	4
2	Tecamachalco	0	0	0

==== Round of 16 ====
Team 1	Agg.	Team 2	1st leg	2nd leg
Tulancingo	3–1	Potros UAEM	1–0	2–1
Deportivo Los Altos	2–3	Cruz Azul Jasso	0–2	2–1
Dorados UACH	6–0	Tampico Madero	2–0	4–0
Albinegros de Orizaba (s.)	2–2	Ocelotes UNACH	1–0	1–2
Tecamachalco	5–2	Unión de Curtidores	1–1	4–1
Bravos de Nuevo Laredo	2–3	Patriotas de Córdoba	0–2	2–1
Chivas Rayadas	5–1	U.A. Tamaulipas	2–1	3–0
Ballenas Galeana Morelos	6–2	Coras Tepic	0–2	6–0

===== First leg =====
25 April 2012	Ocelotes UNACH	0–1	Albinegros de Orizaba	Tapachula
16:00		Report	Hernández 85'	Stadium: Estadio Olímpico de Tapachula; Attendance: 800; Referee: Ilya Izaskun Flores Florián

25 April 2012	U.A. Tamaulipas	1–2	Chivas Rayadas	Ciudad Victoria
16:00	Domínguez 83'	Report	Morán 38'; González 72'	Stadium: Estadio Profesor Eugenio Alvizo Porras; Attendance: 300; Referee: Hernán Ramírez Díaz

25 April 2012	Patriotas de Córdoba	2–0	Bravos de Nuevo Laredo	Córdoba
17:00	Echevarría 30'; Jiménez 71'	Report		Stadium: Estadio Rafael Murillo Vidal; Attendance: 3,000; Referee: Jonathan Hernández Juárez

25 April 2012	Unión de Curtidores	1–1	Tecamachalco	León
17:30	Gallegos 85'	Report	Sánchez 60'	Stadium: Estadio La Martinica; Attendance: 300; Referee: Julio César Mondragón Robles

25 April 2012	Tampico Madero	0–2	Dorados UACH	Tampico and Ciudad Madero
20:30		Report	Villegas 18'; González 77'	Stadium: Estadio Tamaulipas; Attendance: 4,000; Referee: Rodrigo Cervantes Muñóz

25 April 2012	Coras Tepic	2–0	Ballenas Galeana	Tepic
20:30	Luna 49'; Valle 73'	Report		Stadium: Arena Cora; Attendance: 4,000; Referee: Diego Montaño Robles

26 April 2012	Cruz Azul Jasso	2–0	Deportivo Los Altos	Ciudad Cooperativa Cruz Azul
16:30	Mendoza 46'; López 81'	Report		Stadium: Estadio 10 de Diciembre; Attendance: 1,000; Referee: Jorge Adán Tonix Vázquez

26 April 2012	Potros UAEM	0–1	Tulancingo	Toluca
17:00		Report	Meráz 46'	Stadium: Estadio Universitario Alberto "Chivo" Córdoba; Attendance: 150; Referee: Jesús Bisguerra Mendiola

===== Second leg =====
28 April 2012	Tecamachalco	4–1 (5–2 agg.)	Unión de Curtidores	Ciudad Nezahualcóyotl
12:00	Iturbide 8'; Martínez 71'; Quintana 75'; Fernández 82'	Report	Aceves 20'	Stadium: Estadio Neza 86; Attendance: 200; Referee: Edgar Homero Ruíz Díaz

28 April 2012	Albinegros de Orizaba	1–2 (2–2 agg.)	Ocelotes UNACH	Orizaba
16:00	Nieves 77'	Report	Rodas 46'; Lara 84'	Stadium: Estadio Socum; Attendance: 2,000; Referee: Edgar Allan Morales Olvera

28 April 2012	Ballenas Galeana	6–0 (6–2 agg.)	Coras Tepic	Xochitepec
16:30	Pacheco 1', 27'; Bello 5'; Sánchez 10', 17'; Burgoa 22'	Report		Stadium: Estadio Mariano Matamoros; Attendance: 100; Referee: Fernando Hernández Gómez

28 April 2012	Chivas Rayadas	3–0 (5–1 agg.)	U.A. Tamaulipas	Zapopan
17:00	Martínez 31'; Perales 37'; Guillén 90+2'	Report		Stadium: Estadio Omnilife; Attendance: 50; Referee: Adonai Escobedo González

28 April 2012	Deportivo Los Altos	2–1 (2–3 agg.)	Cruz Azul Jasso	Yahualica
18:00	Juárez 27'; Aviléz 63'	Report	Mendoza 61'	Stadium: Estadio Las Ánimas; Attendance: 2,500; Referee: Humberto Sánchez Reyna

28 April 2012	Dorados UACH	4–0 (6–0 agg.)	Tampico Madero	Chihuahua City
18:30	García 44'; Loya 45'; Ledezma 62', 79'	Report		Stadium: Estadio Olímpico Universitario José Reyes Baeza; Attendance: 2,500; Referee: Mario Humberto Vargas Mata

28 April 2012	Bravos de Nuevo Laredo	2–1 (2–3 agg.)	Patriotas de Córdoba	Nuevo Laredo
19:15	Moreno 17'; Ramírez 83'	Report	Echevarría 11'	Stadium: Unidad Deportiva Benito Juárez; Attendance: 1,000; Referee: Marco Antonio Ortíz Nava

29 April 2012	Tulancingo	2–1 (3–1 agg.)	Potros UAEM	Tulancingo
12:00	Mañón 6', 46'	Report	Osorio 89'	Stadium: Estadio Primero de Mayo; Attendance: 2,000; Referee: Marco Antonio Hernández Ramírez

==== Quarter-finals ====
Team 1	Agg.	Team 2	1st leg	2nd leg
Tulancingo (s.)	1–1	Cruz Azul Jasso	0–1	1–0
Dorados UACH	4–3	Albinegros de Orizaba	1–2	3–1
Tecamachalco	8–3	Patriotas de Córdoba	1–3	7–0
Chivas Rayadas	6–3	Ballenas Galeana Morelos	2–2	4–1

===== First leg =====
2 May 2012	Albinegros de Orizaba	2–1	Dorados UACH	Orizaba
16:00	Ruíz 38'; Treviño 72'	Report	Loya 12'	Stadium: Estadio Socum; Attendance: 4,500; Referee: Marco Antonio Hernández Ramírez

2 May 2012	Ballenas Galeana	2–2	Chivas Rayadas	Xochitepec
16:00	Castro 40'; Cruz 60'	Report	Basulto 47'; Ledesma 66'	Stadium: Estadio Mariano Matamoros; Attendance: 300; Referee: Edgar Homero Ruíz Díaz

2 May 2012	Patriotas de Córdoba	3–1	Tecamachalco	Córdoba
17:00	Echevarría 29', 44', 90+1'	Report	Fernández 54'	Stadium: Estadio Rafael Murillo Vidal; Attendance: 3,000; Referee: Carlos Javier Ríos García

3 May 2012	Cruz Azul Jasso	1–0	Tulancingo	Ciudad Cooperativa Cruz Azul
16:30	Verduzco 90+2'	Report		Stadium: Estadio 10 de Diciembre; Attendance: 2,000; Referee: Jonathan Hernández Juárez

===== Second leg =====
5 May 2012	Tecamachalco	7–0 (8–3 agg.)	Patriotas de Córdoba	Ciudad Nezahualcóyotl
12:00	Langarica 3'; Martínez 5'; Iturbide 49', 57', 68'; Quintana 81'; Monroy 90'	Report		Stadium: Estadio Neza 86; Attendance: 300; Referee: Jesús Bisguerra Mendiola

5 May 2012	Chivas Rayadas	4–1 (6–3 agg.)	Ballenas Galeana	Guadalajara
17:00	Castro 37' (own); Martínez 26', 61'; Ledesma 70'	Report	Figueroa 46'	Stadium: Estadio Jalisco; Attendance: 500; Referee: Marco Antonio Ortíz Nava

5 May 2012	Dorados UACH	3–1 (4–3 agg.)	Albinegros de Orizaba	Chihuahua City
19:00	Montes 38'; González 74'; Gutiérrez 76'	Report	Ruíz 89'	Stadium: Estadio Olímpico Universitario José Reyes Baeza; Attendance: 1,500; Referee: Julio César Mondragón Robles

6 May 2012	Tulancingo	1–0 (1–1 agg.)	Cruz Azul Jasso	Tulancingo
12:00	Mañón	Report		Stadium: Estadio Primero de Mayo; Attendance: 1,500; Referee: Fernando Hernández Gómez

==== Semi-finals ====
Team 1	Agg.	Team 2	1st leg	2nd leg
Tulancingo	3–1	Dorados UACH	2–0	1–1
Tecamachalco	5–3	Chivas Rayadas	1–2	4–1

===== First leg =====
9 May 2012	Chivas Rayadas	2–1	Tecamachalco	Zapopan
17:00	Ledesma 3'; Zamora 88'	Report	Fernández 16'	Stadium: Estadio Omnilife; Attendance: 800; Referee: Edgar Homero Ruíz Díaz

10 May 2012	Dorados UACH	0–2	Tulancingo	Chihuahua City
19:00		Report	Fernández 7'; Sánchez 82'	Stadium: Estadio Olímpico Universitario José Reyes Baeza; Attendance: 1,000; Referee: Marco Antonio Ortíz Nava

===== Second leg =====
12 May 2011	Tecamachalco	4–1 (5–3 agg.)	Chivas Rayadas	Ciudad Nezahualcóyotl
12:00	Iturbide 23', 52'; Fernández 56'; Quintana 83'	Report	Torres 70'	Stadium: Estadio Neza 86; Attendance: 500; Referee: Jesús Bisguerra Mendiola

13 May 2011	Tulancingo	1–1 (3–1 agg.)	Dorados UACH	Tulancingo
11:00	Mañón 38'	Report	Castrellón 58'	Stadium: Estadio Primero de Mayo; Attendance: 1,000; Referee: Jorge Adán Tonix Vázquez

==== Final ====
Team 1	Agg.	Team 2	1st leg	2nd leg
Tulancingo	4–0	Tecamachalco	2–0	2–0

===== First leg =====
17 May 2012	Tecamachalco	0–2	Tulancingo	Ciudad Nezahualcóyotl
16:00		Report	Mañón 51', 84'	Stadium: Estadio Neza 86; Attendance: 1,000; Referee: Edgar Homero Ruíz Díaz

===== Second leg =====
20 May 2012	Tulancingo	2–0 (4–0 agg.)	Tecamachalco	Tulancingo
12:00	Mañón 74', 80'	Report		Stadium: Estadio Primero de Mayo; Attendance: 2,500; Referee: Jesús Bisguerra Mendiola

Clausura 2012 winners

2nd title

== Relegation Table ==
P	Team	Pts	G	Pts/G
1	Tulancingo	74	28	2.643
2	Chivas Rayadas	69	28	2.464
3	Deportivo Los Altos	65	28	2.321
4	Tecamachalco	63	28	2.250
5	Loros UdeC	56	28	2.000
6	Deportivo Guamúchil	53	28	1.892
7	Potros UAEM	52	28	1.857
8	Unión de Curtidores	52	28	1.857
9	Albinegros de Orizaba	52	28	1.857
10	Ballenas Galeana Morelos	50	28	1.785
11	Coras Tepic	49	28	1.750
12	Inter Playa del Carmen	48	28	1.714
13	Dorados UACH	47	28	1.678
14	Cruz Azul Jasso	46	28	1.643
15	Tampico Madero	46	28	1.643
16	Ocelotes UNACH	45	28	1.607
17	U.A. Tamaulipas	44	28	1.571
18	Lozaro	43	28	1.535
19	Bravos de Nuevo Laredo	40	28	1.429
20	Guerreros de Acapulco	39	28	1.393
21	Cuautitlán	35	28	1.250
22	Patriotas de Córdoba	34	28	1.214
23	Veracruz "B"	33	28	1.178
24	Vaqueros	31	28	1.107
25	Águilas Reales	30	28	1.071
26	Querétaro "B"	27	28	0.964
27	Excélsior	26	28	0.928
28	Real Saltillo Soccer	25	28	0.892
29	Cachorros UdeG	22	28	0.785
30	San Miguel Caudillos	19	28	0.678

Last updated: 22 April 2012
Source: Liga Premier FMF
P = Position; G = Games played; Pts = Points; Pts/G = Ratio of points to games played

== Promotion to Ascenso MX ==
Titanes de Tulancingo won both tournaments of the season, so at first it had the right to be promoted to Ascenso MX, however, the team did not meet the membership requirements and had to give up its site to another club. Finally, the league granted the ticket to the superior category to Tecamachalco, however, this team had to undergo a restructuring process to be able to compete in the 2013–14 season, finally, this gave rise to the birth of the club Alebrijes de Oaxaca.

== See also ==
- 2011–12 Mexican Primera División season
- 2011–12 Liga de Ascenso season
- 2011–12 Liga de Nuevos Talentos season
