= 2012–13 C.F. Pachuca season =

Pachuca
2012–13 season
- Chairman: Jesús Martínez Patiño
- Manager: Hugo Sánchez (until November 15, 2012); Gabriel Caballero (from November 15, 2012)
- Stadium: Estadio Hidalgo
- Apertura 2012: 13th
- Clausura 2013: 11th
- Copa MX (Apertura): Quarter-finals
- Copa MX (Clausura): Quarter-finals
- Top goalscorer: League: Apertura: Félix Borja (5); Clausura: Darío Carreño; Ángel Reyna (5); All: Félix Borja (7)
- Highest home attendance: Apertura: 27,489 vs Guadalajara (September 29, 2012); Clausura: 28,920 vs Cruz Azul
- Lowest home attendance: Apertura: 12,934 vs Morelia (September 14, 2012); Clausura: 14,045 vs San Luis (March 2, 2013)
Home colours	Away colours

The 2012–13 Pachuca season was the 66th professional season of Mexico's top-flight football league. The season is split into two tournaments—the Torneo Apertura and the Torneo Clausura—each with identical formats and each contested by the same eighteen teams. Pachuca began their season on July 22, 2012 against Atlante, Pachuca play their homes games on Saturdays at 7:00pm local time. Pachuca did not qualify to the final phase in either the Apertura or Clausura tournament.

== Torneo Apertura ==
=== Squad ===
Note: Flags indicate national team as defined under FIFA eligibility rules; some limited exceptions apply. Players may hold more than one non-FIFA nationality.

No.	Pos.	Nation	Player
2	DF	MEX	Leobardo López (Captain)
3	DF	MEX	Néstor Vidrio
4	DF	PAR	Paulo da Silva
5	DF	MEX	Daniel Arreola
6	MF	MEX	Héctor Herrera
7	FW	MEX	Alberto Medina
9	FW	MEX	Enrique Esqueda
10	MF	ARG	Mauro Cejas
11	MF	MEX	Néstor Calderón
12	DF	MEX	Óscar Rojas
13	GK	MEX	Alfonso Blanco
14	MF	ECU	Segundo Castillo
15	DF	MEX	Arturo Ledesma
16	MF	MEX	Jorge Daniel Hernández

No.	Pos.	Nation	Player
18	MF	USA	José Francisco Torres (Vice-Captain)
19	FW	ARG	Joaquín Larrivey
21	FW	MEX	Nery Castillo
22	GK	MEX	Carlos Velázquez
23	FW	ESP	Raúl Tamudo
24	DF	MEX	Miguel Ángel Herrera
25	FW	ITA	Adnane Essoussi
26	MF	MEX	Miguel Velázquez
27	FW	MEX	Víctor Mañón
28	MF	MEX	Julio Gómez
29	FW	MEX	Marco Bueno
30	GK	MEX	Rodolfo Cota
34	DF	MEX	Abraham Torres Nilo
36	MF	MEX	Efrén Mendoza

=== Regular season ===
Win Draw Loss

==== Apertura 2012 results ====
July 22, 2012 Round 1	Atlante	0 – 0	Pachuca	Cancún, Quintana Roo
18:00		Report	Cejas (yellow card) 19'	Stadium: Estadio Andrés Quintana Roo; Referee: Ricardo Arellano

July 28, 2012 Round 2	Pachuca	0 – 3	Atlas	Pachuca, Hidalgo
19:00	Torres (yellow card) 44' (red card); Hernández (red card) 66'	Report	Ponce (yellow card) 34'; Mancilla (yellow card) 45+', (goal) 74'; Cufré (yellow card) 47'; Sandoval 50' da Silva 90' (o.g.)	Stadium: Estadio Hidalgo; Referee: Antony Zanjuampa

August 4, 2012 Round 3	Querétaro	0 – 1	Pachuca	Querétaro, Querétaro
17:00	Cortés (yellow card) 50'	Report	Borja (yellow card) 6' da Silva 52'; M. Velásquez (yellow card) 54'; López (yellow card) 55'; Arreola (yellow card) 66'; Hernández (yellow card) 78'	Stadium: Estadio Corregidora; Attendance: 13,527; Referee: Jorge Isaac Rojas

August 11, 2012 Round 4	Pachuca	2 – 2	Tijuana	Pachuca, Hidalgo
19:00	Borja 61' da Silva (yellow card) 64'; N. Castillo 89'	Report	Aguilar (yellow card) 16', (goal) 33'; Pellerano (yellow card) 54'; Arce 65'; Martínez (yellow card) 69' (yellow-red card) 82'	Stadium: Estadio Hidalgo; Referee: Francisco Chacón

August 19, 2012 Round 5	Toluca	1 – 0	Pachuca	Toluca, Estado de Mexico
12:00	Sinha (yellow card) 68'; Benítez 90+1'	Report	S. Castillo (yellow card) 62'	Stadium: Estadio Nemesio Díez; Attendance: 11,259; Referee: Mauricio Morales

August 25, 2012 Round 6	Pachuca	0 – 0	Santos Laguna	Pachuca, Hidalgo
19:00	Cejas (yellow card) 33'; Hernández (yellow card) 65'; Rojas (yellow card) 90+1'	Report	Ramírez (yellow card) 64'; Salinas (yellow card) 79'	Stadium: Estadio Hidalgo; Attendance: 17,921; Referee: Fabricio Morales

September 1, 2012 Round 7	Cruz Azul	1 – 1	Pachuca	Mexico City
17:00	Perea (yellow card) 25'; Torrado (yellow card) 75', (goal) 90+3'; Aquino (yellow card) 90+1'	Report	Borja 25'; Rojas (yellow card) 35'; López (yellow card) 90+2'	Stadium: Estadio Azul; Attendance: 19,036; Referee: Marco Antonio Rodríguez

September 14, 2012 Round 8	Pachuca	3 – 2	Morelia	Pachuca, Hidalgo
19:30	Borja 14', 25'; Torres 57'; Cota (yellow card) 87'	Report	López 35' (o.g.); Ruiz (yellow card) 50'; Álvarez (yellow card) 56'; Ochoa 74'	Stadium: Estadio Hidalgo; Attendance: 12,934; Referee: Erim Ramírez

September 22, 2012 Round 9	San Luis	1 – 0	Pachuca	San Luis Potosí, San Luis Potosí
17:00	Correa 38'; Cadavid (yellow card) 64'; Paredes (yellow card) 72'; Villaluz (yellow card) 88'	Report	Tamudo (yellow card) 47'; Cejas (yellow card) 70'; Vidrio (yellow card) 88'	Stadium: Estadio Alfonso Lastras; Attendance: 8,778; Referee: Miguel Ángel Ayala

September 29, 2012 Round 10	Pachuca	1 – 0	Guadalajara	Pachuca, Hidalgo
19:00	Cejas (yellow card) 43', (goal) 60' (pen.); Medina (yellow card) 55'; Rojas (yellow card) 65'; Vidrio (yellow card) 74' da Silva (yellow card) 79'	Report	Perales (yellow card) 42'	Stadium: Estadio Hidalgo; Attendance: 27,489; Referee: Jorge Isaac Rojas

October 3, 2012 Round 11	Puebla	2 – 0	Pachuca	Puebla, Puebla
19:00	De Buen (yellow card) 22'; Romo 36'; Hernández (yellow card) 80'; Alustiza 89'	Report	Torres (yellow card) 65'; López (yellow card) 69'	Stadium: Estadio Cuauhtémoc; Attendance: 7,652; Referee: Francisco Chacón

October 6, 2012 Round 12	Pachuca	1 – 1	León	Pachuca, Hidalgo
19:00	Meráz 60'; Hernández (yellow card) 80' (yellow-red card) 90+2'	Report	Britos 38'; Peña (yellow card) 57'; Delgado (yellow card) 74'	Stadium: Estadio Hidalgo; Attendance: 14,969; Referee: César Arturo Ramos

October 14, 2012 Round 13	UNAM	1 – 0	Pachuca	Mexico City
12:00	Velarde (yellow card) 3'; Izazola 84'	Report	Vidrio (yellow card) 29'; Pizarro (yellow card) 61'; Hernández (yellow card) 90+2'	Stadium: Estadio Olímpico Universitario; Attendance: 22,705; Referee: Víctor Bisguerra Mendiola

October 20, 2012 Round 14	Pachuca	1 – 1	Monterrey	Pachuca, Hidalgo
19:00	N. Castillo (yellow card) 36' da Silva (yellow card) 39'; Borja 48'	Report	Reyna 1' de Nigris (yellow card) 28'	Stadium: Estadio Hidalgo; Attendance: 21,194; Referee: Roberto García Orozco

October 27, 2012 Round 15	Pachuca	1 – 0	UANL	Pachuca, Hidalgo
19:00	Meráz 50'; Torres (yellow card) 90+1'	Report	Juninho (yellow card) 88'	Stadium: Estadio Hidalgo; Attendance: 22,951; Referee: José Alfredo Peñaloza

November 3, 2012 Round 16	América	4 – 0	Pachuca	Mexico City
19:00	Benítez 22', 81', 88'; Jiménez 53'; Molina (yellow card) 83'	Report	Vidrio (yellow card) 2'; Rojas (yellow card) 17'	Stadium: Estadio Azteca; Attendance: 24,022; Referee: Ricardo Arellano

November 10, 2012 Round 17	Pachuca	2 – 1	Chiapas	Pachuca, Hidalgo
19:00	Castillo 44'; Hernández (yellow card) 82'; García 87'	Report	Martínez (yellow card) 10'; Corras (yellow card) 54'; Loroña 63'; Jiménez (yellow card) 79'	Stadium: Estadio Hidalgo; Attendance: 17,913; Referee: Luis Enrique Santander

Pachuca did not qualify to the Final Phase

=== Goalscorers ===
Position	Nation	Name	Goals scored
1.	(Ecuador)	Félix Borja	5
2.	(Mexico)	Raúl Meráz	2
3.	(Mexico)	Nery Castillo	1
3.	(Ecuador)	Segundo Castillo	1
3.	(Argentina)	Mauro Cejas	1
3.	(Mexico)	Emilio García Montoya	1
3.	(Paraguay)	Paulo da Silva	1
3.	(United States)	José Francisco Torres	1
TOTAL			13

=== Results ===
==== Results summary ====
Overall								Home						Away					
Pld	W	D	L	GF	GA	GD	Pts	W	D	L	GF	GA	GD	W	D	L	GF	GA	GD
17	5	6	6	13	20	−7	21	4	4	1	11	10	+1	1	2	5	2	10	−8

Last updated: 10 November 2012.
Source: Apertura 2012 results

==== Results by round ====
Round	1	2	3	4	5	6	7	8	9	10	11	12	13	14	15	16	17
Ground	A	H	A	H	A	H	A	H	A	H	A	H	A	H	H	A	H
Result	D	L	W	D	L	D	D	W	L	W	L	D	L	D	W	L	W
Position	13	13	12	12	14	13	13	12	14	11	12	13	13	14	13	14	13

Updated to match(es) played on 11 November 2012. Source: Apertura 2012 results and mediotiempo.com
A = Away; H = Home; W = Win; D = Draw; L = Loss

== Apertura 2012 Copa MX ==
=== Group stage ===
Win Draw Loss

==== Apertura results ====
July 25, 2012 1	U. de G.	1 – 0	Pachuca	Guadalajara, Jalisco
19:00	García (yellow card) 4'; Gutiérrez (yellow card) 59'; Gómez 74' (pen.); Campos (yellow card) 76'	Report	Mendoza (red card) 2'; Sánchez (yellow card) 66'; Medina (yellow card) 73'; Meza (yellow card) 90'	Stadium: Estadio Jalisco; Referee: Jorge Delgado

August 1, 2012 2	Pachuca	3 – 0	U. de G.	Pachuca, Hidalgo
21:00	Borja 11', (yellow card) 45+2'; M. Velásquez (yellow card) 39'; Sánchez 48'; Meza (yellow card) 76'; Torres 90+2'	Report	Cano (yellow card) 25' (yellow-red card) 87'; Rivera (yellow card) 88'	Stadium: Estadio Hidalgo; Referee: Miguel Ángel Flores

August 8, 2012 3	La Piedad	0 – 3	Pachuca	La Piedad, Michoacán
16:00	Rojas (yellow card) 82'	Report	Medina 45'; Mañon 73'; Sánchez (yellow card) 79'; Gómez 83'	Stadium: Estadio Juan N. López; Attendance: 3,000; Referee: Emerson Zamora

August 21, 2012 4	Pachuca	1 – 1	La Piedad	Pachuca, Hidalgo
21:00	Arreola (yellow card) 28'; Herrera 75'	Report	Piña (yellow card) 37'; Cano (yellow card) 44'; Ornelas (yellow card) 57'; Sánchez 68'	Stadium: Estadio Hidalgo; Referee: Luis Enrique Santander

August 29, 2012 5	Atlante	0 – 1	Pachuca	Cancún, Quintana Roo
21:00		Report	Arreola (red card) 40'; Almeia 89'	Stadium: Estadio Andrés Quintana Roo; Attendance: 2,700; Referee: Víctor Bisguerra Mendiola

September 19, 2012 6	Pachuca	1 – 0	Atlante	Pachuca, Hidalgo
21:00	Medina 6'; Pizzaro (yellow card) 32'; Meza (yellow card) 39'	Report	Torres (yellow card) 40'; Marrufo (yellow card) 64'; Zurita (yellow card) 90'	Stadium: Estadio Hidalgo; Attendance: 7,500; Referee: Miguel Ángel Chacón

=== Knockout stage ===
September 26, 2012 Quarter-finals	Neza	1 – 1 (a.e.t.) (4 – 3 p)	Pachuca	Ciudad Nezahualcóyotl, Estado de Mexico
16:00	Rosas 65'	Report	Arreola (yellow card) 49'; Meráz 63'; H. Herrera (yellow card) 90+2'	Stadium: Estadio Neza 86; Attendance: 5,599; Referee: León Vicente Barajas
	Penalties
	Rosas (penalty scored); Arroyo (penalty scored); Atilano (penalty scored); Mejía (penalty scored)		(penalty scored) Cejas; (penalty scored) Rojas; (penalty scored) Hernández; (penalty missed) N. Castillo; (penalty missed) H. Herrera

=== Goalscorers ===
Position	Nation	Name	Goals scored
1.	(Ecuador)	Félix Borja	2
2.	(Mexico)	Alberto Medina	2
3.	(Mexico)	Simón Almeia	1
3.	(Mexico)	Julio Gómez	1
3.	(Mexico)	Miguel Ángel Herrera	1
3.	(Mexico)	Víctor Mañon	1
3.	(Mexico)	Raul Meráz	1
3.	(United States)	José Francisco Torres	1
TOTAL			10

=== Results ===
==== Results by round ====
Round	1	2	3	4	5	6
Ground	A	H	A	H	A	H
Result	L	W	W	D	W	W
Position	4	1	1	1	1	1

Updated to match(es) played on 19 September 2012. Source: Apertura results and mediotiempo.com
A = Away; H = Home; W = Win; D = Draw; L = Loss

== Torneo Clausura ==
=== Squad ===
Note: Flags indicate national team as defined under FIFA eligibility rules; some limited exceptions apply. Players may hold more than one non-FIFA nationality.

No.	Pos.	Nation	Player
3	DF	MEX	Néstor Vidrio
4	DF	PAR	Paulo da Silva (captain)
5	DF	MEX	Daniel Arreola
6	MF	MEX	Héctor Herrera
7	MF	ECU	Christian Suárez
9	FW	MEX	Enrique Esqueda
10	MF	ARG	Daniel Ludueña (vice-captain)
11	MF	MEX	Ángel Reyna
12	DF	MEX	Óscar Rojas
13	GK	MEX	Alfonso Blanco
14	DF	MEX	Fernando Navarro Morán
15	DF	MEX	Arturo Ledesma
16	MF	MEX	Jorge Daniel Hernández
18	MF	COL	Avilés Hurtado
19	FW	MEX	Darío Carreño
21	FW	MEX	Raúl Meraz
22	GK	MEX	Carlos Velázquez
23	MF	MEX	Rodolfo Pizarro
24	DF	MEX	Miguel Ángel Herrera
26	FW	ARG	Fernando Cavenaghi

No.	Pos.	Nation	Player
27	FW	MEX	Víctor Mañón
28	MF	MEX	Julio Gómez
29	FW	MEX	Marco Bueno
30	GK	MEX	Rodolfo Cota
32	MF	MEX	Efrén Mendoza
33	MF	MEX	Jaime Correa
34	MF	MEX	David Carmona
35	MF	COL	Cristian Marrugo
40	DF	MEX	Ricardo Reyes
41	GK	MEX	José González
42	DF	MEX	Benjamin Méndez
44	DF	MEX	Abraham Torres Nilo
45	DF	MEX	Hervey Meza
46	MF	PER	Pier Larrauri
47	MF	MEX	Diego Armendáriz
48	MF	CRC	Vianney Blanco
66	FW	MEX	Emilio García
69	MF	MEX	Simón Almeida
90	FW	MEX	Guillermo Martínez
159	FW	MEX	Josué Mercado

=== Regular season ===
Win Draw Loss

==== Clausura 2013 results ====
January 5, 2013 Round 1	Pachuca	2 – 0	Atlante	Pachuca, Hidalgo
19:00	Hurtado (yellow card) 44'; Carreño 66'; H. Herrera 89'	Report	Uscanga (yellow card) 36'; Castro (yellow card) 76'	Stadium: Estadio Hidalgo; Attendance: 25,934; Referee: César Arturo Ramos

January 12, 2013 Round 2	Atlas	2 – 0	Pachuca	Guadalajara, Jalisco
21:00	Bocanegra (yellow card) 22'; Bravo 35'; Vuoso 65'; Ayala (yellow card) 70'; Razo (red card) 86'; Pinto (yellow card) 90+1'	Report	Bueno (yellow card) 4'; H. Herrera (yellow card) 27' da Silva (yellow card) 35'; Ludueña (yellow card) 49'; Hurtado (yellow card) 63'	Stadium: Estadio Jalisco; Attendance: 29,213; Referee: José Alfredo Peñaloza

January 19, 2013 Round 3	Pachuca	1 – 1	Querétaro	Pachuca, Hidalgo
19:00	da Silva (red card) 12'; Carreño 18'; Hurtado (yellow card) 61'; Reyna (yellow card) 82'	Report	Landín 6'; Escalante (yellow card) 35' (yellow-red card) 43'; Cosme (yellow card) 55'; Mariño (yellow card) 67' (yellow-red card) 88'; Henríquez (yellow card) 78'	Stadium: Estadio Hidalgo; Attendance: 28,150; Referee: Jorge Isaac Rojas

January 26, 2013 Round 4	Tijuana	2 – 0	Pachuca	Tijuana, Baja California
17:00	Castillo (yellow card) 17'; Pellerano (yellow card) 54'; Moreno 57' (pen.); Saucedo (yellow card) 80'; Enriquez 84'	Report	Reyna (yellow card) 9'; Arreola (yellow card) 30'; Vidrio (yellow card) 37'; Hernández (yellow card) 76'	Stadium: Estadio Caliente; Attendance: 22,633; Referee: Ricardo Arellano

February 2, 2013 Round 5	Pachuca	1 – 0	Toluca	Pachuca, Hidalgo
19:00	Carreño 20'	Report	Pinto (yellow card) 53'; Gamboa (yellow card) 74'	Stadium: Estadio Hidalgo; Attendance: 27,798; Referee: Paul Delgadillo

February 8, 2013 Round 6	Santos Laguna	0 – 1	Pachuca	Torreón, Coahuila
16:00	Quintero (yellow card) 4'; Baloy (yellow card) 43'; Estrada (yellow card) 60'; Suárez (yellow card) 90+4'	Report	H. Herrera 10'; Rojas (yellow card) 29'	Stadium: Estadio Corona; Attendance: 23,569; Referee: Marco Antonio Rodríguez

February 16, 2013 Round 7	Pachuca	2 – 1	Cruz Azul	Pachuca, Hidalgo
19:00	Reyna 3', (yellow card) 52'; Hernández (yellow card) 27'; Navarro (yellow card) 66'; Suárez 77', (yellow card) 78'	Report	A. Castro (yellow card) 24'; Gutiérrez 34' (pen.); Giménez (yellow card) 52'; Flores (yellow card) 69'; Chávez (yellow card) 86'	Stadium: Estadio Hidalgo; Attendance: 28,920; Referee: Fernando Guerrero

February 22, 2013 Round 8	Morelia	3 – 2	Pachuca	Morelia, Michoacán
19:30	Montero 7'; Salinas (yellow card) 20'; Mancilla 34', 70' (pen.); Valdez (yellow card) 54'	Report	Arreola (yellow card) 18'; Carreño 21'; Navarro (yellow card) 33'; Reyna (yellow card) 52', (goal) 80'; Hernández (yellow card) 82'; Suárez (yellow card) 87'	Stadium: Estadio Morelos; Attendance: 10,667; Referee: Miguel Ángel Ayala

March 2, 2013 Round 9	Pachuca	2 – 1	San Luis	Pachuca, Hidalgo
19:00	Suárez 41'; Reyna 70' da Silva (yellow card) 75'	Report	Velasco (yellow card) 16'; Pérez (yellow card) 50', (goal) 56'	Stadium: Estadio Hidalgo; Attendance: 14,045; Referee: Víctor Bisguerra

March 10, 2013 Round 10	Guadalajara	1 – 0	Pachuca	Zapopan, Jalisco
17:00	Márquez 19'; Cortés (yellow card) 42'	Report	Arreola (yellow card) 15'	Stadium: Estadio Omnilife; Attendance: 23,729; Referee: Miguel Ángel Chacón

March 16, 2013 Round 11	Pachuca	2 – 1	Puebla	Pachuca, Hidalgo
19:00	Arreola (yellow card) 26'; Carreño 89'; Reyna 90+2'	Report	de Buen 26'; Romo (yellow card) 31'; Durán (yellow card) 77'	Stadium: Estadio Hidalgo; Referee: César Arturo Ramos

March 30, 2013 Round 12	León	0 – 0	Pachuca	León, Guanajuato
20:05	Maz (red card) 76'; Montes (yellow card) 44' (red card) 83'; Márquez (yellow card) 82'; Castillo (yellow card) 88'	Report	H. Herrera (yellow card) 44' (red card) 50' da Silva (yellow card) 75'; Arreola (yellow card) 77'; Hurtado (yellow card) 89'	Stadium: Estadio León; Referee: Miguel Ángel Flores

April 6, 2013 Round 13	Pachuca	1 – 2	UNAM	Pachuca, Hidalgo
19:00	da Silva 56'; Marrugo (yellow card) 58'; M. Herrera (yellow card) 88'	Report	Verón (yellow card) 25'; Velarde 53'; Bravo (yellow card) 79'; Cortés 83'	Stadium: Estadio Hidalgo; Referee: Antony Zanjuampa

April 13, 2013 Round 14	Monterrey	2 – 0	Pachuca	Monterrey, Nuevo León
19:00	Zavala (yellow card) 7'; Corona 26'; Ayoví (yellow card) 36'; Delgado (yellow card) 50'; Meza (yellow card) 50'; Cardozo 72'	Report	Marrugo (yellow card) 83'	Stadium: Estadio Tecnológico; Attendance: 33,292; Referee: José Alfredo Peñaloza

April 20, 2013 Round 15	UANL	3 – 1	Pachuca	San Nicolás de los Garza, Nuevo León
19:00	Salcido 22', 87'; Lobos 40'	Report	Cavenaghi 65'	Stadium: Estadio Universitario; Attendance: 38,100; Referee: Fabricio Morales

April 27, 2013 Round 16	Pachuca	2 – 4	América	Pachuca, Hidalgo
19:00	Reyna 12', (yellow card) 31' da Silva (yellow card) 41'; Cavenaghi 49'; Arreola (red card); H. Herrera (yellow card) 74'	Report	Jiménez (yellow card) 20', (goal) 68' (pen.); Mosquera (yellow card) 21'; Sambueza (yellow card) 31'; Aldrete (yellow card) 32'; Benítez 60', 65', 77'	Stadium: Estadio Hidalgo; Referee: Marco Antonio Rodríguez

May 3, 2013 Round 17	Chiapas	2 – 1	Pachuca	Tuxtla Gutiérrez, Chiapas
19:30	Esqueda 24'; Andrade (yellow card) 58'; Rey 90+1'	Report	Bueno 80'	Stadium: Estadio Victor Manuel Reyna; Referee: Miguel Ángel Ayala

Pachuca did not qualify to the Final Phase

=== Goalscorers ===
Position	Nation	Name	Goals scored
1.	(Mexico)	Darío Carreño	5
1.	(Mexico)	Ángel Reyna	5
3.	(Argentina)	Fernando Cavenaghi	2
3.	(Mexico)	Héctor Herrera	2
3.	(Ecuador)	Christian Suárez	2
6.	(Mexico)	Marco Bueno	1
6.	(Paraguay)	Paulo da Silva	1
TOTAL			18

=== Results ===
==== Results summary ====
Overall								Home						Away					
Pld	W	D	L	GF	GA	GD	Pts	W	D	L	GF	GA	GD	W	D	L	GF	GA	GD
17	6	2	9	18	25	−7	20	5	1	2	13	10	+3	1	1	7	5	15	−10

Last updated: 4 May 2013.
Source: Clausura 2013 results

==== Results by round ====
Round	1	2	3	4	5	6	7	8	9	10	11	12	13	14	15	16	17
Ground	H	A	H	A	H	A	H	A	H	A	H	A	H	A	A	H	A
Result	W	L	D	L	W	W	W	L	W	L	W	D	D	L	L	L	L
Position	2	9	12	12	8	7	5	5	5	7	5	5	6	9	10	10	11

Updated to match(es) played on 5 May 2013. Source: Clausura 2013 results and mediotiempo.com
A = Away; H = Home; W = Win; D = Draw; L = Loss

== Clausura 2013 Copa MX ==
=== Group stage ===
Win Draw Loss

==== Clausura results ====
January 16, 2013 1	UAT	1 – 2	Pachuca	Ciudad Victoria, Tamaulipas
21:00	Cazaubón (yellow card) 43'; Ayala (yellow card) 59'; Espinoza (yellow card) 72'; Jiménez 90+3'	Report	Navarro 29'; Marrugo (yellow card) 38'; Esqueda 90'	Stadium: Estadio Marte R. Gómez; Attendance: 7,358; Referee: Arturo Cruz Hurtado

January 23, 2013 2	Pachuca	3 – 1	UAT	Pachuca, Hidalgo
19:00	Ludueña 21'; M. Herrera 57'; Meraz 72'; Mañon (yellow card) 88'	Report	Gallegos 28'; Molina (yellow card) 58'; Orozco (red card) 67'	Stadium: Estadio Hidalgo; Referee: Oscar Macías Romo

February 13, 2013 3	Pachuca	4 – 0	Dorados	Pachuca, Hidalgo
19:00	García 50'; Marrugo (yellow card) 62'; Correa (yellow card) 76'; Cavenaghi 87'; Mañon 90+1'; Meráz 90+3'	Report	Acosta (yellow card) 46'; Güemez (yellow card) 79'; Blanco (yellow card) 80'	Stadium: Estadio Hidalgo; Attendance: 10,298; Referee: Miguel Ángel Ayala

February 19, 2013 4	Dorados	5 – 2	Pachuca	Culiacán, Sinaloa
20:00	Velázquez 12'; Meza 18' (o.g.); Güemez (yellow card) 23', (goal) 55'; Frausto (yellow card) 35'; Acosta (yellow card) 43'; Castro (yellow card) 54'; Ramírez 68'; Blanco 79'	Report	Ledesma (yellow card) 7'; Pizzaro 22', (yellow card) 60'; Meza (yellow card) 36'; Torres (yellow card) 42'; Correa (yellow card) 43'; Mendoza (yellow card) 51'; Ameida 69'	Stadium: Estadio Banorte; Referee: Quetzalli Alvarado

February 26, 2013 5	Pachuca	4 – 2	Atlante	Pachuca, Hidalgo
19:00	Ludueña 3', 51'; Cavenaghi 23', 62'; M. Herrera (yellow card) 45'	Report	García 11'; Jiménez (yellow card) 22'; Amione (yellow card) 50', (goal) 88'	Stadium: Estadio Hidalgo; Attendance: 5,842; Referee: Luis Enrique Santander

March 6, 2013 6	Atlante	1 – 0	Pachuca	Cancún, Quintana Roo
19:00	Fonseca 10'; García (yellow card) 60'	Report	Torres (yellow card) 51'; Mañon (yellow card) 79'; Meraz (yellow card) 86'	Stadium: Estadio Andrés Quintana Roo; Attendance: 2,991; Referee: Miguel Ángel Ortega

=== Knockout stage ===
March 13, 2013 Quarter-finals	Pachuca	1 – 1 (3 – 5 p)	Puebla	Pachuca, Hidalgo
19:00	Hurtado (yellow card) 52'; Carreño 80'	Report	Durán (yellow card) 11'; Orozco (yellow card) 38' (yellow-red card) 89'; Medina (yellow card) 71'; Beasley 55'	Stadium: Estadio Hidalgo; Attendance: 10,426; Referee: Jorge Isaac Rojas
	Penalties
	Cavenaghi (penalty scored); Ledesma (penalty missed); Carreño (penalty scored); H. Herrera (penalty scored)		(penalty scored) Noriega; (penalty scored) Castillo; (penalty scored) Lacerda; (penalty scored) de Buen; (penalty scored) Romo

=== Goalscorers ===
Position	Nation	Name	Goals scored
1.	(Argentina)	Fernando Cavenaghi	3
1.	(Argentina)	Daniel Ludueña	3
3.	(Mexico)	Raúl Meraz	2
4.	(Mexico)	Simón Almeida	1
4.	(Mexico)	Darío Carreño	1
4.	(Mexico)	Enrique Esqueda	1
4.	(Mexico)	Emilio García	1
4.	(Mexico)	Miguel Ángel Herrera	1
4.	(Mexico)	Víctor Mañon	1
4.	(Mexico)	Fernando Navarro	1
4.	(Mexico)	Rodolfo Pizarro	1
TOTAL			16

=== Results ===
==== Results by round ====
Round	1	2	3	4	5	6
Ground	A	H	H	A	H	A
Result	W	W	W	L	W	L
Position	1	1	1	2	1	2

Updated to match(es) played on 6 March 2013. Source: Clausura results and mediotiempo.com
A = Away; H = Home; W = Win; D = Draw; L = Loss
