= 2008–09 Liga Premier de Ascenso season =

Liga Premier de Ascenso
- Season: 2008–09
- Dates: 8 August 2008 – 31 May 2009
- Champions: Apertura: Mérida; Clausura; Universidad del Fútbol
- Promoted: Mérida
- Stats are from the regular season only

The 2008–09 Liga Premier de Ascenso season was split in two tournaments Apertura and Clausura. Liga Premier was the third-tier football league of Mexico. The season was played between 8 August 2008 and 31 May 2009.

As of this season, the Segunda División de México was divided into different branches: the Liga Premier de Ascenso for the more developed teams that have aspirations for promotion to Liga de Ascenso and the Liga de Nuevos Talentos for those clubs with less infrastructure.

== Teams ==
=== Group 1 ===
Location of teams in the 2008–09 LPA Group 1

Club	City	Stadium	Capacity
Atlético Tapatío	Chalco, State of Mexico	Arreola	2,500
Cañeros del Zacatepec	Zacatepec, Morelos	Agustín "Coruco" Díaz	13,000
Cuautitlán	Cuautitlán, State of Mexico	Los Pinos	5,000
ECA Norte	Oaxtepec, Morelos	Centro Vacacional IMSS	9,000
Inter Playa	Playa del Carmen, Quintana Roo	Unidad Deportiva Mario Villanueva Madrid	7,500
Mérida	Mérida, Yucatán	Alonso Diego Molina; Carlos Iturralde	2,500; 15,087
Ocelotes UNACH	Tapachula, Chiapas	Olímpico de Tapachula	11,000
Orizaba	Orizaba, Veracruz	Socum	7,000
Pioneros de Cancún	Cancún, Quintana Roo	Cancún 86	6,809
Potros UAEM	Toluca, State of Mexico	Alberto "Chivo" Córdoba	32,603
Pumas Naucalpan	Mexico City; Cuernavaca, Morelos	La Cantera	2,000
Tecamachalco	Ciudad Nezahualcóyotl, State of Mexico	Neza 86	20,000
Tiburones Rojos de Córdoba	Veracruz, Veracruz	Rafael Murillo Vidal	3,800
Universidad del Fútbol	Pachuca, Hidalgo	Hidalgo	27,512

=== Group 2 ===
Location of teams in the 2008–09 LPA Group 2

Club	City	Stadium	Capacity
Altamira	Altamira, Tamaulipas	Altamira	9,581
Ángeles de Comsbmra	Acapulco, Guerrero	Unidad Deportiva Acapulco	13,000
Bravos	Nuevo Laredo, Tamaulipas	Unidad Deportiva Benito Juárez	5,000
Cachorros León	León, Guanajuato	Nou Camp	31,297
Celaya	Celaya, Guanajuato	Miguel Alemán Valdés	23,182
Cruz Azul Jasso	Jasso, Hidalgo	10 de Diciembre	7,761
Excélsior	Salinas Victoria, Nuevo León	Centro Deportivo Soriana	2,000
Irapuato	Irapuato, Guanajuato	Sergio León Chávez	25,000
La Piedad	La Piedad, Michoacán	Juan N. López	13,356
Necaxa Rayos	Aguascalientes City, Aguascalientes	Victoria	23,851
Petroleros de Salamanca	Salamanca, Guanajuato	Olímpico Sección XXIV	10,000
Querétaro "B"	Querétaro City, Querétaro	Municipal de Querétaro	4,000
Tampico Madero	Tampico Madero, Tamaulipas	Tamaulipas	19,667
Unión de Curtidores	León, Guanajuato	Antonio R. Márquez; La Martinica	2,000; 11,000

=== Group 3 ===
Location of teams in the 2008–09 LPA Group 3

Club	City	Stadium	Capacity
Atlético Lagunero	Gómez Palacio, Durango	Unidad Deportiva Francisco Gómez Palacio	4,000
Búhos de Hermosillo	Hermosillo, Sonora	Héroe de Nacozari	18,747
Cachorros UdeG	Guadalajara, Jalisco	Jalisco; Club Deportivo U. de G.	55,020; 3,000
Cuervos Negros de Zapotlanejo	Zapotlanejo, Jalisco	Miguel Hidalgo	1,500
Delfines de Los Cabos	Cabo San Lucas, Baja California Sur	San José 78; Unidad Deportiva Los Cangrejos	2,000
Dorados Los Mochis	Los Mochis, Sinaloa	Centenario LM	11,134
Dorados UACH	Chihuahua City, Chihuahua	Olímpico Universitario José Reyes Baeza	22,000
Loros UdeC	Colima City, Colima	Olímpico Universitario de Colima	11,812
Soccer Manzanillo	Manzanillo, Colima	Colima; Gustavo Vázquez Montes	12,000; 4,000
Toros de Zacatecas	Zacatecas City, Zacatecas	Francisco Villa	14,000
UAG Tecomán	Zapopan, Jalisco	Tres de Marzo	18,779
Vaqueros	Ixtlán del Río, Nayarit	Roberto Gómez Reyes	4,000
Xoloitzcuintles Vaqueros de Nayarit	Tepic, Nayarit	Nicolás Álvarez Ortega; Roberto Gómez Reyes	12,271; 4,000
Zorros de Reynosa	Reynosa, Tamaulipas	Unidad Deportiva Solidaridad	20,000

== Torneo Apertura ==
=== Regular season ===
==== Group 1 ====
===== League table =====
Pos	Team	Pld	W	D	L	GF	GA	GD	Pts	Qualification or relegation
1	Mérida	17	9	4	4	20	16	+4	35	Liguilla de Ascenso
2	Universidad del Fútbol	17	10	3	4	39	15	+24	34	Liguilla de Ascenso
3	Potros UAEM	17	8	5	4	31	26	+5	32	
4	Tiburones Rojos de Córdoba	17	8	5	4	36	26	+10	31	
5	Albinegros de Orizaba	17	8	3	6	24	18	+6	30	
6	Pioneros de Cancún	17	6	7	4	36	26	+10	27	
7	Pumas Naucalpan	17	6	5	6	24	18	+6	27	
8	Cañeros del Zacatepec	17	6	7	4	23	24	−1	27	
9	Atlético Tapatío	17	4	8	5	23	25	−2	24	
10	Inter Playa del Carmen	17	3	8	6	18	21	−3	21	
11	ECA Norte	17	4	6	7	18	30	−12	21	
12	Tecamachalco	17	4	5	8	28	40	−12	18	
13	Cuautitlán	17	4	5	8	23	33	−10	17	
14	Ocelotes UNACH	17	4	4	9	25	41	−16	17	

Source: RSSSF

===== Results =====
Home \ Away	ATP	CUA	ECA	IPC	MER	OUC	ORI	PIO	UEM	PUM	TEC	TRC	UDF	ZAC
Atlético Tapatío	—	—	—	1–1	—	—	—	—	0–0	1–5	3–1	3–2	—	2–2
Cuautitlán	2–2	—	2–1	0–2	—	—	—	—	2–3	—	3–1	2–2	—	2–0
ECA Norte	2–1	—	—	0–0	0–0	2–2	—	—	—	—	2–1	—	2–2	1–1
Inter Playa	—	—	—	—	1–2	2–0	—	—	2–2	1–1	—	0–0	0–3	—
Mérida	1–0	0–0	—	—	—	—	3–2	1–0	—	—	1–0	—	—	1–1
Ocelotes UNACH	1–1	4–2	—	—	0–2	—	0–2	3–2	—	—	3–2	—	—	—
Orizaba	1–1	2–1	3–0	1–0	—	—	—	1–1	—	—	1–1	—	—	2–1
Pioneros	0–1	4–1	3–0	1–2	—	—	—	—	—	—	3–3	8–5	—	5–1
Potros UAEM	—	—	3–1	—	1–1	5–1	1–0	3–0	—	0–3	—	—	0–4	—
Pumas Naucalpan	—	0–0	1–0	—	3–0	2–0	0–2	0–2	—	—	—	—	0–1	—
Tecamachalco	—	—	—	3–2	—	—	—	—	—	2–2	—	2–1	1–3	2–2
TR Córdoba	—	—	4–2	—	2–0	1–0	3–1	—	2–2	1–0	—	—	3–0	—
Universidad del Fútbol	1–1	2–0	—	—	0–1	8–1	1–0	1–1	—	—	—	—	—	—
Zacatepec	—	—	—	3–2	—	2–1	—	—	0–2	1–0	—	2–0	2–0	—

Source: Liga BBVA MX
Legend: Blue = home team win; Yellow = draw; Red = away team win.

==== Group 2 ====
===== League table =====
Pos	Team	Pld	W	D	L	GF	GA	GD	Pts	Qualification or relegation
1	Necaxa Rayos	17	11	3	3	41	23	+18	38	Liguilla de Ascenso
2	Cruz Azul Jasso	17	10	4	3	31	10	+21	37	Liguilla de Ascenso
3	Bravos de Nuevo Laredo	17	9	6	2	27	16	+11	35	Liguilla de Ascenso
4	Celaya	17	8	5	4	20	12	+8	33	
5	Querétaro	17	6	7	4	24	17	+7	29	
6	La Piedad	17	7	3	7	30	27	+3	25	
7	Tampico Madero	17	8	0	9	28	23	+5	24	
8	Irapuato	17	6	4	7	22	20	+2	23	
9	Altamira	17	4	6	7	23	31	−8	21	
10	Unión de Curtidores	17	5	4	8	26	38	−12	20	
11	Petroleros de Salamanca	17	4	3	10	30	49	−19	17	
12	Ángeles de Comsbmra	17	4	3	10	19	27	−8	16	
13	Cachorros León	17	3	3	11	17	34	−17	12	
14	Excélsior	17	1	3	13	15	52	−37	7	

Source: RSSSF

===== Results =====
Home \ Away	ALT	ANG	BRA	CAL	CEL	CAJ	EXC	IRA	LPD	NEC	QUE	SAL	TAM	UDC
Altamira	—	1–1	1–1	—	0–0	—	—	—	0–2	—	—	3–2	2–3	1–2
Ángeles Comsbmra	—	—	0–1	2–2	0–3	0–2	3–0	0–1	—	—	2–0	—	—	—
Bravos	—	—	—	2–0	—	0–0	—	—	4–3	0–0	1–0	4–1	2–0	—
Cachorros León	2–3	—	—	—	—	0–2	0–0	1–2	—	1–2	—	—	1–0	—
Celaya	—	—	1–0	3–0	—	0–0	1–1	1–0	—	—	—	—	—	—
Cruz Azul Jasso	4–1	—	—	—	—	—	3–0	2–0	2–0	0–1	—	—	3–2	—
Excélsior	2–0	—	1–2	—	—	—	—	—	0–2	1–9	—	2–2	1–2	—
Irapuato	1–1	—	1–1	—	—	—	7–0	—	1–3	1–2	—	2–1	0–2	0–2
La Piedad	—	2–1	—	0–1	2–2	—	—	—	—	—	1–0	6–2	—	0–0
Necaxa Rayos	2–0	2–1	—	—	3–2	—	—	—	1–2	—	1–3	3–3	—	6–1
Querétaro	1–3	—	—	4–1	0–0	1–1	3–1	0–0	—	—	—	—	2–1	—
Salamanca	—	2–3	—	3–2	2–0	0–5	—	—	—	—	1–1	—	—	3–0
Tampico Madero	—	1–0	—	—	0–1	—	—	—	3–2	0–1	—	1–2	—	4–0
Unión de Curtidores		2–1	2–2	1–2	1–3	0–2	5–2	—	—	—	0–2	—	—	—

Source: Liga BBVA MX
Legend: Blue = home team win; Yellow = draw; Red = away team win.

==== Group 3 ====
===== League table =====
Pos	Team	Pld	W	D	L	GF	GA	GD	Pts	Qualification or relegation
1	Loros UdeC	17	13	2	2	47	22	+25	41	Liguilla de Ascenso
2	Cuervos Negros de Zapotlanejo	17	10	4	3	34	22	+12	36	Liguilla de Ascenso
3	Dorados Los Mochis	17	9	5	3	42	26	+16	34	Liguilla de Ascenso
4	Soccer Manzanillo	17	7	6	4	37	26	+11	30	
5	Dorados UACH	17	8	4	5	32	26	+6	30	
6	Xoloitzcuintles Vaqueros de Nayarit	17	8	4	5	27	22	+5	29	
7	Búhos de Hermosillo	17	8	3	6	30	25	+5	28	
8	Zorros de Reynosa	17	6	6	5	24	22	+2	27	
9	Toros de Zacatecas	17	6	3	8	30	37	−7	23	
10	Cachorros UdeG	17	6	4	7	30	46	−16	23	
11	UAG Tecomán	17	5	4	8	24	28	−4	22	
12	Vaqueros	17	4	5	8	22	21	+1	21	
13	Delfines de Los Cabos	17	3	4	10	28	36	−8	16	
14	Atlético Lagunero	17	1	3	13	17	38	−21	7	

Source: RSSSF

===== Results =====
Home \ Away	ALG	BUH	CUG	CNZ	DEL	DLM	DUC	LUC	SMZ	TOR	UAG	VAQ	XVN	ZOR
Atlético Lagunero	—	—	3–5	—	—	2–3	1–3	1–1	—	—	0–1	—	0–1	4–2
Búhos Hermosillo	2–0	—	1–3	—	—	3–2	—	0–1	—	—	2–1	—	2–1	6–1
Cachorros UdeG	—	—	—	1–0	—	—	1–1	—	0–1	—	1–1	2–2	1–1	—
Cuervos Negros	3–2	3–1	—	—	2–2	1–0	—	—	1–1	4–2	—	—	—	—
Delfines de Los Cabos	3–1	1–2	6–1	—	—	1–1	—	2–3	—	1–2	—	—	—	—
Dorados Los Mochis	—	—	6–0	—	—	—	5–2	2–1	—	—	3–1	5–0	1–0	—
Dorados UACH	—	2–1	—	2–3	5–0	—	—	—	2–1	1–1	—	3–0	—	1–0
Loros UdeC	—	—	7–1	2–1	—	—	3–1	—	—	—	2–1	4–2	4–2	—
Soccer Manzanillo	0–0	—	—	—	3–1	2–2	—	1–2	—	2–2	—	—	—	—
Toros Zacatecas	2–0	—	2–0	—	—	5–2	—	2–4	—	—	—	—	1–3	0–0
UAG Tecomán	—	—	—	1–2	2–0	—	2–1	—	1–5	5–1	—	1–0	—	1–2
Vaqueros	2–2	0–1	—	6–3	2–1	—	—	—	2–2	2–1	—	—	—	—
Xoloitzcuintles VN	—	—	—	0–3	4–1	—	0–0	—	3–0	—	3–1	1–1	—	2–0
Zorros Reynosa	—	—	2–3	1–1	3–1	1–1	—	0–0	2–1	—	—	2–0	—	—

Source: Liga BBVA MX
Legend: Blue = home team win; Yellow = draw; Red = away team win.

=== Inter–groups matches ===
In the Apertura 2008 and Clausura 2009 tournaments, the league determined the celebration of two weeks of matches between teams belonging to different groups.

==== Week 1 ====
- Petroleros de Salamanca 0–4 Delfines de Los Cabos
- Unión de Curtidores 2–1 Vaqueros
- Bravos de Nuevo Laredo 2–0 Potros UAEM
- Excélsior 1–2 Tecamachalco
- Cruz Azul Jasso 4–0 Atlético Lagunero
- Pumas Naucalpan 2–3 Dorados Los Mochis
- ECA Norte 2–1 Loros UdeC
- Toros de Zacatecas 1–2 Albinegros de Orizaba
- Inter Playa del Carmen 1–1 Soccer Manzanillo
- Altamira 3–1 Ocelotes UNACH
- Pioneros de Cancún 1–1 Cuervos Negros de Zapotlanejo
- Celaya 1–0 Mérida
- Zorros de Reynosa 1–0 Universidad del Fútbol
- UAG Tecomán 4–0 Ángeles de Comsbmra
- Querétaro 3–0 Cachorros UdeG
- TR Córdoba 5–0 Xoloitzcuintles Vaqueros
- Zacatepec 2–1 Irapuato
- La Piedad 1–3 Dorados UACH
- Necaxa Rayos 1–0 Búhos de Hermosillo
- Tampico Madero 3–1 Cuautitlán
- Cachorros León 0–0 Atlético Tapatío

==== Week 2 ====
- Irapuato 2–0 Toros de Zacatecas
- Potros UAEM 3–2 Petroleros de Salamanca
- Dorados UACH 2–2 Pioneros de Cancún
- Búhos de Hermosillo 1–1 ECA Norte
- Mérida 3–1 Cruz Azul Jasso
- Xoloitzcuintles Vaqueros 2–1 Celaya
- Tecamachalco 2–2 Querétaro
- Ángeles de Comsbmra 0–0 Zacatepec
- Albinegros de Orizaba 2–0 UAG Tecomán
- Ocelotes UNACH 3–2 La Piedad
- Atlético Tapatío 2–3 Necaxa Rayos
- Cuautitlán 3–3 Unión de Curtidores
- Atlético Lagunero 1–2 TR Córdoba
- Loros UdeC 4–1 Cachorros León
- Delfines de Los Cabos 0–0 Inter Playa del Carmen
- Dorados Los Mochis 2–1 Tampico Madero
- Vaqueros 2–0 Pumas Naucalpan
- Cuervos Negros de Zapotlanejo 3–0 Altamira
- Zorros de Reynosa 5–1 Excélsior
- Soccer Manzanillo 4–2 Bravos de Nuevo Laredo
- Universidad del Fútbol 5–0 Cachorros UdeG

==== Week 3 ====
- Irapuato 2–1 Albinegros de Orizaba
- Unión de Curtidores 2–2 Dorados Los Mochis
- Potros UAEM 3–2 Delfines de Los Cabos
- Cachorros UdeG 7–2 Tecamachalco
- Excélsior 1–4 Universidad del Fútbol
- Cruz Azul Jasso 0–2 Xoloitzcuintles Vaqueros
- Pumas Naucalpan 3–1 Tampico Madero
- ECA Norte 2–1 Cachorros León
- Ocelotes UNACH 3–0 Dorados UACH
- Atlético Tapatío 1–2 Búhos de Hermosillo
- Cuautitlán 1–0 Vaqueros
- Inter Playa del Carmen 0–1 Bravos de Nuevo Laredo
- Atlético Lagunero 0–1 Mérida
- Altamira 1–1 Pioneros de Cancún
- Toros de Zacatecas 4–3 Ángeles de Comsbmra
- La Piedad 0–2 Cuervos Negros de Zapotlanejo
- Celaya 0–1 TR Córdoba
- UAG Tecomán 1–1 Zacatepec
- Querétaro 0–0 Zorros de Reynosa
- Soccer Manzanillo 7–2 Petroleros de Salamanca
- Necaxa Rayos 2–4 Loros UdeC

==== Week 4 ====
- Petroleros de Salamanca 2–3 Dorados UACH
- Potros UAEM 1–1 Irapuato
- Cachorros UdeG 4–3 Unión de Curtidores
- Búhos de Hermosillo 3–3 Ocelotes UNACH
- Xoloitzcuintles Vaqueros 2–2 Inter Playa del Carmen
- Tecamachalco 0–2 Celaya
- Ángeles de Comsbmra 0–0 Atlético Lagunero
- Albinegros de Orizaba 1–2 Cuervos Negros de Zapotlanejo
- Mérida 3–4 Soccer Manzanillo
- Loros UdeC 4–1 Cuautitlán
- Pioneros de Cancún 2–1 Excélsior
- Delfines de Los Cabos 2–2 La Piedad
- Dorados Los Mochis 2–2 Necaxa Rayos
- Vaqueros 0–0 Cruz Azul Jasso
- Zorros de Reynosa 1–1 Atlético Tapatío
- Universidad del Fútbol 4–1 Toros de Zacatecas
- Querétaro 0–0 UAG Tecomán
- TR Córdoba 3–3 Altamira
- Zacatepec 2–2 Bravos de Nuevo Laredo
- Tampico Madero 4–0 ECA Norte
- Cachorros León 2–2 Pumas Naucalpan

=== Liguilla ===
Quarter-finals
1	Loros UdeC	2	3	5
8	Dorados Los Mochis	2	0	2
2	Necaxa Rayos	1	4	5
7	Universidad del Fútbol	5	5	10
4	Cuervos Negros	2	3	5
5	Bravos	3	4	7
3	Cruz Azul Jasso	0	1	1
6	Mérida	2	0	2

Semi-finals
1	Loros UdeC	1	1	2
7	Universidad del Fútbol (R)	0	2	2
5	Bravos	0	2	2
6	Mérida	1	2	3

Final
1	Loros UdeC	1	1	2 (2)
6	Mérida (pen.)	0	2	2 (3)

==== Quarter-finals ====
Team 1	Agg.	Team 2	1st leg	2nd leg
Loros UdeC	5–2	Dorados Los Mochis	2–2	3–0
Necaxa Rayos	5–10	Universidad del Fútbol	1–5	4–5
Cuervos Negros	5–7	Bravos	2–3	3–4
Cruz Azul Jasso	1–2	Mérida	0–2	1–0

===== First leg =====
3 December 2008	Universidad del Fútbol	5–1	Necaxa Rayos	Pachuca
13:00	Brambila 11', 88'; Cardona 81' (o.g.); Cruz 89'; Estrada 90'	Report	Hernández 83'	Stadium: Estadio Hidalgo; Attendance: 50; Referee: Osvaldo Sánchez Huerta

3 December 2008	Mérida	2–0	Cruz Azul Jasso	Mérida
15:00	Pérez 8', 80'	Report		Stadium: Estadio Carlos Iturralde; Attendance: 500; Referee: Raúl Alejandro Ucán Moreno

3 December 2008	Dorados Los Mochis	2–2	Loros UdeC	Los Mochis
15:00	Escalante 25' ?	Report	Macías 22'; Gallegos 67'	Stadium: Estadio Centenario; Attendance: 300; Referee: Miguel Ángel Ayala Ramíre

3 December 2008	Bravos	3–2	Cuervos Negros	Nuevo Laredo
20:15	Figueroa 4' (o.g.); Cámara 17'; Patiño 30'	Report	Aguas 34', 50'	Stadium: Unidad Deportiva Benito Juárez; Attendance: 4,000; Referee: Osvaldo Hernández Cobos

===== Second leg =====
6 December 2008	Cruz Azul Jasso	1–0 (1–2 agg.)	Mérida	Ciudad Cooperativa Cruz Azul
11:00	León 25'	Report		Stadium: Estadio 10 de Diciembre; Attendance: 200; Referee: Fernando Guerrero Ramírez

6 December 2008	Necaxa Rayos	4–5 (5–10 agg.)	Universidad del Fútbol	Aguascalientes City
15:00	Ornelas 55'; Orozco 68', 76'; Isijara 80'	Report	Cruz 14'; Estrada 19'; Cortés 64', 71', 89'	Stadium: Estadio Victoria; Attendance: 500; Referee: Fernando Torrez López

6 December 2008	Loros UdeC	3–0 (5–2 agg.)	Dorados Los Mochis	Colima City
16:00	Vizcarra 22'; Alvarado 52'; González 78'	Report		Stadium: Estadio Olímpico Universitario de Colima; Attendance: 3,000; Referee: Miguel Ángel Flores Rodríguez

6 December 2008	Cuervos Negros	3–4 (5–7 agg.)	Bravos	Zapotlanejo
16:00	Arenas 36'; Soto 49'; Arellano 88'	Report	Ruíz 41'; Cámara 55', 75'; Reyes 66'	Stadium: Estadio Miguel Hidalgo; Attendance: 160; Referee: Juan Gerónimo Cruz Rivera

==== Semi-finals ====
Team 1	Agg.	Team 2	1st leg	2nd leg
Loros UdeC	2–2	Universidad del Fútbol	0–1	1–2
Bravos	2–3	Mérida	0–1	2–2

===== First leg =====
10 December 2008	Universidad del Fútbol	0–1	Loros UdeC	Pachuca
12:00		Report	Ríos 83'	Stadium: Estadio Hidalgo; Attendance: 100; Referee: Humberto Mauricio Cruz González

10 December 2008	Mérida	1–0	Bravos	Mérida
15:00	Pérez 33'	Report		Stadium: Estadio Carlos Iturralde; Attendance: 250; Referee: Alejandro de los Santos Arias

===== Second leg =====
13 December 2008	Loros UdeC	1–2 (2–2 agg.)	Universidad del Fútbol	Colima City
16:00	Rebolledo 74'	Report	Estrada 82'; Cortés 88'	Stadium: Estadio Olímpico Universitario de Colima; Attendance: 1,000; Referee: Israel Perea Vázquez

13 December 2008	Bravos	2–2 (2–3 agg.)	Mérida	Nuevo Laredo
18:00	Serrano 54'; Cámara 83'	Report	Herrera 21'; Silva 90'	Stadium: Unidad Deportiva Benito Juárez; Attendance: 7,000; Referee: Félix Augusto López Carrillo

==== Final ====
Team 1	Agg.	Team 2	1st leg	2nd leg
Loros UdeC	2–2 (2-3)	(pen.) Mérida	1–0	1–2

===== First leg =====
17 December 2008	Mérida	0–1	Loros UdeC	Mérida
15:00		Report	Silva 51' (o.g.)	Stadium: Estadio Carlos Iturralde; Attendance: 1,000; Referee: Miguel Ángel Chacón Viveros

===== Second leg =====
20 December 2008	Loros UdeC	1–2 (2–2 agg.) (2–3 p)	Mérida	Colima City
16:00	Rebolledo 72'	Report	Uribe 19'; Alday 65'	Stadium: Estadio Olímpico Universitario de Colima; Attendance: 7,000; Referee: Ricardo Arellano Nieves

Apertura 2008 winners
Mérida
1st title

== Torneo Clausura ==
In the final part of the Clausura 2009 tournament, the regular season and the start of the playoffs were affected by the 2009 swine flu pandemic, so some games were canceled and the coefficient of points/games played had to be used to determine the final positions of the classification table. In addition, some games were played behind closed doors, however, the season could end in the usual way.

=== Regular season ===
==== Group 1 ====
===== League table =====
Pos	Team	Pld	W	D	L	GF	GA	Pts	Coeff	
1	Universidad del Fútbol	17	13	1	3	46	17	41	2.411	Liguilla de Ascenso
2	Albinegros de Orizaba	17	10	3	4	29	18	35	2.058	Liguilla de Ascenso
3	Pumas Naucalpan	17	9	5	3	27	19	35	2.058	Liguilla de Ascenso
4	Cuautitlán	16	6	5	5	22	22	27	1.687	
5	Potros UAEM	17	7	6	4	28	24	28	1.647	
6	Tiburones Rojos de Córdoba	17	6	6	5	22	17	27	1.588	
7	Tecamachalco	16	5	7	4	27	31	25	1.563	
8	Cañeros del Zacatepec	17	5	7	5	23	28	25	1.471	
9	Mérida	16	6	3	7	24	24	23	1.438	
10	Inter Playa del Carmen	16	7	1	8	18	19	23	1.438	
11	Atlético Tapatío	16	4	6	6	18	25	20	1.250	
12	Pioneros de Cancún	16	3	7	6	14	21	17	1.063	
13	ECA Norte	17	2	5	10	23	32	15	0.882	
14	Ocelotes UNACH	17	3	3	11	25	41	13	0.765	

Source: RSSSF

===== Results =====
Home \ Away	ATP	CUA	ECA	IPC	MER	OUC	ORI	PIO	UEM	PUM	TEC	TRC	UDF	ZAC
Atlético Tapatío	—	—	3–1	—	0–0	2–1	1–2	1–1	—	—	—	—	1–3	—
Cuautitlán	—	—	—	—	4–3	3–3	0–2	2–0	—	0–0	—	—	0–2	—
ECA Norte	—	3–1	—	—	—	—	0–3	1–3	1–2	1–2	—	1–1	—	—
Inter Playa	0–0	0–2	2–1	—	—	—	1–0	2–0	—	—	2–0	—	—	3–0
Mérida	—	—	3–1	—	—	2–1	—	—	1–2	2–3	—	1–3	1–0	—
Ocelotes UNACH	—	—	0–4	0–3	—	—	—	—	4–5	1–0	—	2–0	0–3	1–2
Orizaba	—	—	—	—	1–0	1–1	—	—	2–0	3–2	—	2–1	1–3	—
Pioneros	—	—	—	—	2–4	2–2	2–1	—	0–0	1–1	—	—	1–0	—
Potros UAEM	2–0	0–0	—	2–0	—	—	—	—	—	—	2–3	1–1	—	0–0
Pumas Naucalpan	3–0	—	—	0–0	—	—	—	—	3–3	—	1–0	2–0	—	1–1
Tecamachalco	2–2	2–2	2–2	—	2–2	3–2	3–1	—	—	—	—	—	—	—
TR Córdoba	0–0	3–1	—	2–1	—	—	—	2–0	—	—	0–0	—	—	5–1
Universidad del Fútbol	—	—	3–2	2–0	—	—	—	—	4–1	4–0	5–1	2–2	—	4–0
Zacatepec	4–0	1–1	2–1	—	1–1	—	0–4	2–0	—	—	2–2	—	—	—

Source: Liga BBVA MX
Legend: Blue = home team win; Yellow = draw; Red = away team win.

==== Group 2 ====
===== League table =====
Pos	Team	Pld	W	D	L	GF	GA	Pts	Coeff	
1	Altamira	17	10	4	3	30	16	35	2.059	Liguilla de Ascenso
2	La Piedad	17	9	4	4	27	16	33	1.941	Liguilla de Ascenso
3	Petroleros de Salamanca	17	7	6	4	24	11	33	1.941	
4	Ángeles de Comsbmra	17	8	6	3	20	14	33	1.941	
5	Celaya	16	8	3	5	21	14	28	1.750	
6	Unión de Curtidores	17	6	6	5	23	19	28	1.647	
7	Cruz Azul Jasso	17	5	6	6	20	20	24	1.412	
8	Necaxa Rayos	16	6	2	8	22	21	21	1.313	
9	Excélsior	17	4	7	6	18	23	22	1.294	
10	Querétaro	17	5	5	7	22	30	22	1.294	
11	Irapuato	16	5	5	6	17	17	20	1.250	
12	Tampico Madero	17	4	5	8	11	30	20	1.176	
13	Cachorros León	17	3	5	9	13	24	16	0.941	
14	Bravos de Nuevo Laredo	16	1	6	9	6	22	13	0.813	

Source: RSSSF

===== Results =====
Home \ Away	ALT	ANG	BRA	CAL	CEL	CAJ	EXC	IRA	LPD	NEC	QUE	SAL	TAM	UDC
Altamira	—	—	—	2–1	—	1–1	1–0	2–0	—	2–0	5–0	—	—	—
Ángeles Comsbmra	1–1	—	—	—	—	—	—	—	0–1	1–0	—	0–0	0–0	2–1
Bravos	3–5	0–1	—	—	—	—	0–0	1–0	—	—	—	—	—	0–0
Cachorros León	—	1–2	0–0	—	1–2	1–1	—	—	2–0	—	1–1	1–0	—	1–1
Celaya	1–2	2–1	—	—	—	—	—	—	3–2	2–1	3–0	0–2	5–0	1–0
Cruz Azul Jasso	—	1–1	1–0	—	0–1	—	—	—	—	—	3–3	0–1	—	0–1
Excélsior	—	3–0	—	1–0	0–0	2–1	—	1–0	—	—	1–2	—	—	2–2
Irapuato	—	1–1	—	3–0	0–0	1–0	—	—	—	—	2–1	—	—	—
La Piedad	0–0	—	2–0	—	—	1–0	5–0	4–1	—	1–0	—	—	2–1	—
Necaxa Rayos	—	—	1–1	4–1	—	1–2	3–1	—	—	—	—	1–0	2–0	—
Querétaro	—	0–2	1–1	—	—	—	—	—	1–1	2–1	—	1–3	—	0–2
Salamanca	3–0	—	4–0	—	—	—	1–1	0–0	2–2	—	—	—	4–1	—
Tampico Madero	0–0	—	1–0	1–0	—	2–1	1–1	1–1	—	—	1–0	—	—	—
Unión de Curtidores	2–1	—	—	—	—	—	—	2–2	1–0	0–2	—	1–3	4–0	—

Source: Liga BBVA MX
Legend: Blue = home team win; Yellow = draw; Red = away team win.

==== Group 3 ====
===== League table =====
Pos	Team	Pld	W	D	L	GF	GA	Pts	Coeff	
1	Soccer Manzanillo	17	13	1	3	36	12	41	2.412	Liguilla de Ascenso
2	Dorados Los Mochis	17	10	6	1	38	15	40	2.353	Liguilla de Ascenso
3	Loros UdeC	17	11	4	2	32	17	40	2.353	Liguilla de Ascenso
4	Dorados UACH	17	9	7	1	31	13	35	2.059	
5	Xoloitzcuintles Vaqueros de Nayarit	17	6	6	5	24	25	26	1.529	
6	Delfines de Los Cabos	16	6	3	7	26	33	23	1.438	
7	Vaqueros	17	5	5	7	17	25	24	1.412	
8	Búhos de Hermosillo	16	6	3	7	26	21	22	1.294	
9	Cuervos Negros de Zapotlanejo	15	4	5	6	22	23	20	1.250	
10	UAG Tecomán	16	5	5	6	20	24	20	1.250	
11	Zorros de Reynosa	16	5	2	9	17	29	19	1.188	
12	Cachorros UdeG	16	2	6	8	19	28	15	0.938	
13	Toros de Zacatecas	17	2	4	11	11	29	12	0.706	
14	Atlético Lagunero (Note: The team was expelled after Week 6 due to debts with the FMF.)	16	1	0	15	4	34	3	0.188	

Source: RSSSF

===== Results =====
Home \ Away	ALG	BUH	CUG	CNZ	DEL	DLM	DUC	LUC	SMZ	TOR	UAG	VAQ	XVN	ZOR
Atlético Lagunero	—	—	—	—	—	—	—	—	—	3–2	—	—	—	—
Búhos Hermosillo	—	—	—	2–0	5–1	—	1–2	—	2–3	3–0	—	1–1	—	—
Cachorros UdeG	—	0–0	—	—	2–0	1–1	—	3–3	—	0–0	—	—	—	3–0
Cuervos Negros	—	—	3–1	—	—	—	2–2	1–2	—	—	—	2–0	2–4	0–0
Delfines de Los Cabos	—	—	—	1–4	—	—	1–1	—	1–1	—	2–3	4–2	0–0	3–1
Dorados Los Mochis	—	2–1	—	1–1	4–2	—	—	—	2–1	2–0	—	—	—	5–0
Dorados UACH	4–0	—	2–0	—	—	1–1	—	0–1	—	—	1–0	—	4–1	—
Loros UdeC	—	2–1	—	—	4–0	2–2	—	—	1–0	1–0	—	—	—	3–2
Soccer Manzanillo	—	—	3–1	3–1	—	—	2–3	—	—	—	2–0	5–0	2–0	2–0
Toros Zacatecas	—	—	—	1–1	3–0	—	0–0	—	0–3	—	0–1	1–0	—	—
UAG Tecomán	3–0	2–1	1–1	—	—	0–2	—	1–3	—	—	—	—	3–0	—
Vaqueros	—	—	2–0	—	—	0–2	2–2	2–0	—	—	1–1	—	0–0	1–0
Xoloitzcuintles VN	1–0	1–2	2–2	—	—	2–2	—	2–2	—	2–1	—	—	—	—
Zorros Reynosa	—	1–0	—	—	—	—	0–3	—	—	4–1	0–0	—	3–2	—

Source: Liga BBVA MX
Legend: Blue = home team win; Yellow = draw; Red = away team win.

=== Inter–groups matches ===
In the Apertura 2008 and Clausura 2009 tournaments, the league determined the celebration of two weeks of matches between teams belonging to different groups.

==== Week 1 ====
- Potros UAEM 4–0 Bravos de Nuevo Laredo
- Dorados UACH 2–1 La Piedad
- Cahorros UdeG 1–2 Querétaro
- Búhos de Hermosillo 2–1 Necaxa Rayos
- Xoloitzcuintles Vaqueros 1–0 TR Córdoba
- Tecamachalco 1–1 Excélsior
- Ángeles de Comsbmra 2–1 UAG Tecomán
- Atlético Tapatío 2–0 Cachorros León
- Mérida 1–0 Celaya
- Ocelotes UNACH 3–1 Altamira
- Dorados Los Mochis 2–0 Pumas Naucalpan
- Delfines de Los Cabos 1–0 Petroleros de Salamanca
- Cuautitlán 2–0 Tampico Madero
- Loros UdeC 2–2 ECA Norte
- Atlético Lagunero 1–2 Cruz Azul Jasso
- Vaqueros 1–1 Unión de Curtidores
- Cuervos Negros de Zapotlanejo 0–0 Pioneros de Cancún
- Irapuato 3–0 Zacatepec
- Universidad del Fútbol 2–4 Zorros de Reynosa
- Albinegros de Orizaba 1–1 Toros de Zacatecas
- Soccer Manzanillo 3–1 Inter Playa del Carmen

==== Week 2 ====
- Petroleros de Salamanca 1–1 Potros UAEM
- Cachorros UdeG 1–3 Universidad del Fútbol
- Unión de Curtidores 1–2 Cuautitlán
- Bravos de Nuevo Laredo 0–1 Soccer Manzanillo
- Cruz Azul Jasso 2–1 Mérida
- Excélsior 0–1 Zorros de Reynosa
- Pumas Naucalpan 2–0 Vaqueros
- ECA Norte 0–0 Búhos de Hermosillo
- Pioneros de Cancún 0–0 Dorados UACH
- Inter Playa del Carmen 2–3 Delfines de Los Cabos
- Altamira 4–1 Cuervos Negros de Zapotlanejo
- Toros de Zacatecas 1–3 Irapuato
- Celaya 0–2 Xoloitzcuintles Vaqueros
- UAG Tecomán 2–2 Albinegros de Orizaba
- Zacatepec 2–2 Ángeles de Comsbmra
- Querétaro 4–1 Tecamachalco
- Tampico Madero 0–5 Dorados Los Mochis
- La Piedad 2–1 Ocelotes UNACH
- Necaxa Rayos 2–2 Atlético Tapatío
- Cachorros León 0–2 Loros UdeC

==== Week 3 ====
- Petroleros de Salamanca 0–1 Soccer Manzanillo
- Dorados UACH 4–1 Ocelotes UNACH
- Búhos de Hermosillo 3–2 Atlético Tapatío
- Bravos de Nuevo Laredo 0–1 Inter Playa del Carmen
- Xoloitzcuintles Vaqueros 2–2 Cruz Azul Jasso
- Tecamachalco 3–2 Cachorros UdeG
- Ángeles de Comsbmra 2–0 Toros de Zacatecas
- Delfines de Los Cabos 4–1 Potros UAEM
- Pioneros de Cancún 0–1 Altamira
- Loros UdeC 2–0 Necaxa Rayos
- Dorados Los Mochis 1–1 Unión de Curtidores
- Vaqueros 2–1 Cuautitlán
- Cuervos Negros de Zapotlanejo 1–2 La Piedad
- Universidad del Fútbol 3–2 Excélsior
- TR Córdoba 0–0 Celaya
- Albinegros de Orizaba 1–0 Irapuato
- Zacatepec 5–0 UAG Tecomán
- Zorros de Reynosa 0–2 Querétaro
- Tampico Madero 1–2 Pumas Naucalpan
- Cachorros León 2–1 ECA Norte

==== Week 4 ====
- Dorados UACH 0–0 Petroleros de Salamanca
- Bravos de Nuevo Laredo 0–0 Zacatepec
- Unión de Curtidores 3–1 Cachorros UdeG
- Excélsior 1–1 Pioneros de Cancún
- Cruz Azul Jasso 3–1 Vaqueros
- Atlético Tapatío 2–1 Zorros de Reynosa
- ECA Norte 1–1 Tampico Madero
- Ocelotes UNACH 3–2 Búhos de Hermosillo
- Cuautitlán 1–0 Loros UdeC
- Inter Playa del Carmen 0–2 Xoloitzcuintles Vaqueros
- Pumas Naucalpan 1–1 Cachorros León
- Toros de Zacatecas 0–3 Universidad del Fútbol
- Altamira 2–0 TR Córdoba
- Celaya 1–2 Tecamachalco
- Cuervos Negros de Zapotlanejo 1–2 Albinegros de Orizaba
- UAG Tecomán 2–2 Querétaro
- Irapuato 0–2 Potros UAEM
- Soccer Manzanillo 2–0 Mérida
- La Piedad 2–1 Delfines de Los Cabos
- Necaxa Rayos 3–2 Dorados Los Mochis

=== Liguilla ===
Quarter-finals
1	Universidad del Fútbol	0	2	2
7	Pumas Naucalpan	0	0	0
4	Loros UdeC	1	2	3
5	Altamira	2	3	5
2	Soccer Manzanillo	4	5	9
6	Albinegros de Orizaba	0	0	0
3	Dorados Los Mochis	1	6	7
8	La Piedad	1	1	2

Semi-finals
1	Universidad del Fútbol	3	3	6
5	Altamira	1	0	1
2	Soccer Manzanillo	1	3	4
3	Dorados Los Mochis	3	2	5

Final
1	Universidad del Fútbol	2	3	5
3	Dorados Los Mochis	1	1	2

==== Quarter-finals ====
Team 1	Agg.	Team 2	1st leg	2nd leg
Universidad del Fútbol	2–0	Pumas Naucalpan	2–0	0–0
Loros UdeC	3–5	Altamira	1–2	2–3
Soccer Manzanillo	9–0	Albinegros de Orizaba	4–0	5–0
Dorados Los Mochis	7–2	La Piedad	1–1	6–1

===== First leg =====
6 May 2009	La Piedad	1–1	Dorados Los Mochis	La Piedad
17:30	Urias 52'	Report	Carrillo 32'	Stadium: Estadio Juan N. López; Attendance: 0 Referee: Oscar Bernardo Villagómez Gurría

6 May 2009	Altamira	2–1	Loros UdeC	Altamira
20:00	Rocha 55', 82'	Report	Morett 50'	Stadium: Estadio Altamira; Attendance: 0 Referee: Humberto Sánchez Reyna

7 May 2009	Albinegros de Orizaba	0–4	Soccer Manzanillo	Orizaba
15:00		Report	Hernández 13', 49'; Paz 59'; Alanís 78'	Stadium: Estadio Socum; Attendance: 0 Referee: Erick Arce Castillo

7 May 2009	Pumas Naucalpan	0–2	Universidad del Fútbol	Cuernavaca
17:00		Report	Brambila 53'; Sánchez 89'	Stadium: Estadio Centenario; Attendance: 0 Referee: Arturo Cruz Hurtado

===== Second leg =====
9 May 2009	Dorados Los Mochis	6–1 (7–2 agg.)	La Piedad	Los Mochis
17:00	Carrillo 13', 55'; Torres 40'; Velázquez 66'; Salcido 75', 89'	Report	Urias 61'	Stadium: Estadio Centenario; Attendance: 0 Referee: Edgar Adrián Amparano Martínez

9 May 2009	Loros UdeC	2–3 (3–5 agg.)	Altamira	Colima City
19:00	Rebolledo 33'; Vizcarra 67'	Report	Chavira 39'; Rocha 60'; Anguiano 85'	Stadium: Estadio Olímpico Universitario de Colima; Attendance: 0 Referee: José Alejandro Aranda Godinez

10 May 2009	Soccer Manzanillo	5–0 (9–0 agg.)	Albinegros de Orizaba	Manzanillo
15:00	Páez 50', 66'; Paz 54'; Cota 64'; Hernández 70'	Report		Stadium: Estadio Gustavo Vázquez Montes; Attendance: 0 Referee: Roberto Gutiérrez Soto

10 May 2009	Universidad del Fútbol	0–0 (2–0 agg.)	Pumas Naucalpan	Pachuca
16:00		Report		Stadium: Estadio Hidalgo; Attendance: 0 Referee: León Vicente Barajas Anzures

==== Semi-finals ====
Team 1	Agg.	Team 2	1st leg	2nd leg
Universidad del Fútbol	6–1	Altamira	3–1	3–0
Soccer Manzanillo	4–5	Dorados Los Mochis	1–3	3–2

===== First leg =====
13 May 2009	Altamira	1–3	Universidad del Fútbol	Altamira
20:00	Rodríguez 44'	Report	Brambila 11'; Cruz 46'; Herrera 54'	Stadium: Estadio Altamira; Attendance: 3,500; Referee: Baruch Absalón Castellanos

14 May 2009	Dorados Los Mochis	3–1	Soccer Manzanillo	Los Mochis
17:00	Carrillo 42', 48'; Alarcón 88'	Report	Páez 13'	Stadium: Estadio Centenario; Attendance: 1,500; Referee: Marco Antonio Ortíz Nava

===== Second leg =====
16 May 2009	Universidad del Fútbol	3–0 (6–1 agg.)	Altamira	Pachuca
12:00	Sánchez 76'; Peña 83'; Martínez 89'	Report		Stadium: Estadio Hidalgo; Attendance: 300; Referee: Javier Moctezuma Nolasco

17 May 2009	Soccer Manzanillo	3–2 (4–5 agg.)	Dorados Los Mochis	Manzanillo
15:00	Paéz 20'; Paz 43'; Hernández 73'	Report	Unknown; Unknown	Stadium: Estadio Gustavo Vázquez Montes; Attendance: 1,500; Referee: Jorge Luis Delgado Salas

==== Final ====
Team 1	Agg.	Team 2	1st leg	2nd leg
Universidad del Fútbol	3–2	Dorados Los Mochis	2–1	1–1

===== First leg =====
20 May 2009	Dorados Los Mochis	1–2	Universidad del Fútbol	Los Mochis
17:00	Arredondo 36'	Report	Mañón 59'; Peña 68'	Stadium: Estadio Centenario; Attendance: 4,500; Referee: Miguel Ángel Ortega Ríos

===== Second leg =====
23 May 2009	Universidad del Fútbol	3–1 (5–2 agg.)	Dorados Los Mochis	Pachuca
12:00	Mañón 30', 44'; Sánchez 67'	Report	Escalante 22'	Stadium: Estadio Hidalgo; Attendance: Julio David Escobar Barba; Referee: 800

Clausura 2009 winners
Universidad del Fútbol
2nd title

== Relegation Table ==
P	Team	Pts	G	Pts/G
1	Loros UdeC	81	34	2.382
2	Universidad del Fútbol	75	34	2.205
3	Dorados Los Mochis	74	34	2.176
4	Soccer Manzanillo	71	34	2.088'
5	Dorados UACH	65	34	1.911
6	Albinegros de Orizaba	65	34	1.911
7	Celaya	61	33	1.848
8	Pumas Naucalpan	62	34	1.823
9	Cruz Azul Jasso	61	34	1.794
10	Necaxa Rayos	59	33	1.787
11	Potros UAEM	60	34	1.764
12	Mérida	58	33	1.757
13	La Piedad	58	34	1.705
14	TR Córdoba	58	34	1.705
15	Cuervos Negros	56	33	1.696
16	Altamira	56	34	1.647
17	Xoloitzcuintles Vaqueros	55	34	1.617
18	Cañeros del Zacatepec	52	34	1.529
19	Querétaro	51	34	1.500
20	Petroleros de Salamanca	50	34	1.470
21	Búhos de Hermosillo	50	34	1.470
22	Bravos de Nuevo Laredo	48	33	1.454
23	Ángeles de Comsbmra	49	34	1.441
24	Unión de Curtidores	48	34	1.411
25	Zorros de Reynosa	46	33	1.393
26	Cuautitlán	44	33	1.333
27	Inter Playa del Carmen	44	33	1.333
28	Atlético Tapatío	44	33	1.333
29	Pioneros de Cancún	44	33	1.333
30	Vaqueros	45	34	1.323
31	Tecamachalco	43	33	1.303
32	Irapuato	43	33	1.303
34	Tampico Madero	44	34	1.294
35	Delfines de Los Cabos	39	33	1.181
36	Cachorros UdeG	38	33	1.151
37	ECA Norte	36	34	1.058
38	Toros de Zacatecas	35	34	1.029
39	Ocelotes UNACH	30	34	0.882
40	Excélsior	29	34	0.852
41	Cachorros León	28	34	0.823
42	Atlético Lagunero	10	33	0.303

== Promotion Final ==
The Promotion Final is a series of matches played by the champions of the tournaments Apertura and Clausura, the game is played to determine the winning team of the promotion to Liga de Ascenso. The first leg was played on 27 May 2009, and the second leg was played on 30 May 2009.

Team 1	Agg.	Team 2	1st leg	2nd leg
Universidad del Fútbol	2–3	Mérida	1–2	1–1

=== First leg ===
27 May 2009	Mérida	2–1	Universidad del Fútbol	Mérida
15:00	Alday 48'; Pérez 56'	Report	Peña 81'	Stadium: Estadio Carlos Iturralde; Attendance: 1,000; Referee: Jorge Macías Romo

=== Second leg ===
30 May 2009	Universidad del Fútbol	1–1 (2–3 agg.)	Mérida	Pachuca
12:00	Cruz 80'	Report	Portela 73'	Stadium: Estadio Hidalgo; Attendance: 6,000; Referee: Román Rafael Medina Vázquez

2008–09 winners
Mérida
1st title

== See also ==
- Primera División de México Apertura 2008
- Primera División de México Clausura 2009
- 2008–09 Primera División A season
- 2008–09 Liga de Nuevos Talentos season
