= Adrián Marín (footballer, born 1994) =

Mexican footballer (born 1994)

Personal information
- Full name: Adrián Marín Lugo
- Date of birth: 13 May 1994 (age 32)
- Place of birth: Monterrey, Mexico
- Height: 1.68 m (5 ft 6 in)
- Position: Forward

Youth career
- Excelsior
- San Luis

Senior career*
Years	Team	Apps	(Gls)
2012–2013	San Luis	6	(0)
2013–2014	→ BUAP (loan)	20	(7)
2014–2016	Chiapas	21	(1)
2015	→ América (loan)	2	(0)
2017–2019	Cafetaleros de Tapachula	49	(9)
2018	→ Herediano (loan)	2	(1)
2019–2020	Alebrijes de Oaxaca	11	(2)
2020	Los Cabos	0	(0)
2021	Sinaloa	34	(5)
2022	CD Tudelano	6	(0)
2022	Malacateco	18	(1)
2023	UdeG	6	(0)
- * Club domestic league appearances and goals

Adrián Marín Lugo (born 13 May 1994) is a Mexican professional footballer who plays as a forward. He made his Liga MX debut in 2012 with San Luis at the age of 17.

== Career ==
A native of Monterrey, Marín began playing football at a young age. His first club was local side Excelsior. At age 17, Marín joined the San Luis youth setup, where he led the Liga MX Sub-20 league in scoring. He made his professional debut on 18 March 2012, coming on for Wilmer Aguirre in the 84th minute of a 1–0 Liga MX win over Puebla. Marín made five more league appearances, all as late substitutes.

Marín was loaned out to Lobos BUAP of Ascenso MX on 31 May 2013. He made 20 league appearances, all but two as part of the starting lineup. The 2013 Apertura season saw him make plenty of appearances with no goals. Marín scored his first league goal in the 7th minute of a 2–1 victory against Zacatepec on 4 January 2014, the first week of the Clausura 2014. That season, he tied for third place in the league with 7 goals.

After his successful season in the second division, he was called back up to San Luis in July 2014, which had by then become Chiapas F.C. He scored his first-ever Liga MX goal in his third game back, six minutes after coming on for Alan Zamora in a 2–1 win over Veracruz.

In June 2015, Marín was loaned out to América. He played two matches for the Águilas.

Marín was released by Chiapas in April 2016 after posting pictures of alcoholic beverages on Facebook.

Marín joined the Cafetaleros de Tapachula ahead of the Clausura 2017 season.

In February 2018, Marín signed for Costa Rican side Herediano. However, he made just two appearance for the club.

He played with Los Cabos of the Liga de Balompié Mexicano during the league's inaugural season in 2020–21.
