= Héctor Velázquez =

Héctor Velázquez may refer to:

- Héctor Velázquez (baseball) (born 1988), Mexican professional baseball player
- Héctor Velázquez (boxer) (born 1975), Mexican former professional boxer
- Héctor Velázquez (footballer) (born 1989), Mexican former professional footballer
- Héctor Velázquez (physician) (1864-1945), Paraguayan ophthalmologist and foreign minister
- Héctor Velázquez Moreno (1922–2006), Mexican architect

== See also ==
- Héctor Velásquez (1952–2010), Chilean Olympic boxer
