= Miguel Velázquez =

Miguel Velázquez may refer to:

- Miguel Velázquez (boxer) (born 1944), Spanish boxer
- Miguel Velázquez (footballer) (born 1990), Mexican footballer
