= Efrén Mendoza =

Mexican footballer (born 1992)

Efren Mendoza
Personal information
- Full name: Efren Mendoza Cuahutle
- Date of birth: 9 June 1992 (age 34)
- Place of birth: Contla de Juan Cuamatzi, Tlaxcala, Mexico
- Height: 1.71 m (5 ft 7 in)
- Positions: Defender; midfielder

Youth career
- 2009–2012: Atlas

Senior career*
Years	Team	Apps	(Gls)
2008	Académicos	6	(0)
2011–2012	Atlas	9	(0)
2012–2013	→ Pachuca (loan)	3	(0)
2013–2019	UdeG	133	(5)
2019	Potros UAEM	9	(0)
2020	San José	0	(0)
2021–2023	Tlaxcala	61	(0)
- * Club domestic league appearances and goals as of 24 April 2022

Efren Mendoza Cuahutle (born 9 June 1992) is a Mexican professional footballer.

== Career ==
His first team was the Atlas de Guadalajara where he made his debut in the Clausura 2011 in the draw to zero of his team against the Pumas UNAM being the only game he played in that tournament. He went to Pachuca in the 2012 Apertura. In the 2013 Apertura, he was transferred to the Leones Negros UdeG where he achieved promotion to the maximum circuit.

=== Potros UAEM ===
On 18 June 2019, Mendoza joined Ascenso MX club Potros UAEM.
