= Club Deportivo Lozaro =

Mexican football club

Club Lozaro
- Full name: Club Deportivo Lozaro
- Nicknames: Inter, Playa, Lagartos
- Founded: 2008
- Ground: Olimpico Oxtepec, Yautepec, Morelos
- Capacity: 1,000
- Chairman: José Luis Lozano de la Rosa
- Manager: Marihño Ladezma Chavéz
- League: Segunda División Profesional
| Home colours | Away colours |

Club Deportivo Lozaro is Mexican football club that plays in the Segunda División Profesional. The club is based in Yautepec, Morelos.

== See also ==
- Football in Mexico
