= Patriotas de Córdoba =

Mexican football club

- Full name: Patriotas de Córdoba
- Nickname: Los Patriotas (The Patriots)
- Founded: 2009
- Dissolved: 2017
- Ground: UVM Campus Villa Rica; Boca del Río, Veracruz
- Capacity: 3,000
Home colours	Away colours	Third colours

Patriotas de Córdoba was Mexican football club that played in the Liga Premier. The club was based in Córdoba, Veracruz.

== History ==
Patriotas de Cordoba was founded in 2009 by Rafael Lavín Levet and the club takes its name after the Patriots that started the Mexican Revolution. The club joined the Tercera División de México in 2009, in that same year the club reached the final against América Manzanillo. The club would go on to earn promotion to the Segunda División Profesional where they currently play.

== See also ==
- Football in Mexico

== Honors ==
- Tercera División de México (1):2009-10
- Third Division Promotion (1):2010
