= Emilio García (footballer) =

Mexican footballer (born 1994)

Personal information
- Full name: Emilio García Montoya
- Date of birth: October 24, 1994 (age 32)
- Place of birth: Tijuana, Mexico
- Height: 1.78 m (5 ft 10 in)
- Position: Midfielder

Youth career
- Curtidores
- C.F. Pachuca

Senior career*
Years	Team	Apps	(Gls)
2012–2017	Pachuca	4	(1)
2014	→ Estudiantes Tecos (loan)	3	(0)
2015	→ Tlaxcala (loan)		
2016–2017	→ Rio Grande Valley Toros (loan)	43	(6)
- * Club domestic league appearances and goals as of 16:48, 21 October 2017 (UTC)

Emilio García Montoya (born 24 October 1994), known as Emilio García, is a Mexican footballer who most recently played for Pachuca.

== Career ==
=== Professional ===
García began his career with Pachuca, spending time on loan with Estudiantes Tecos and Tlaxcala in Mexico, before transferring on loan to United Soccer League side Rio Grande Valley FC Toros on March 26, 2016.
