= Angeles Comsbmra =

Mexican football club

- Full name: Cclub Deportivo Angeles Comsbmra
- Founded: July 2007
- Ground: PREPARATORIA LIC. BENITO JUAREZ
- Chairman: COMSBMRA INC
- Manager: Raúl González Origuela
- League: Segunda División Profesional
Home colours	Away colours

Angeles Comsbmra is a football club in the Mexican football league system Segunda División Profesional in Puebla, Puebla, Mexico. The club is owned by the company, Comercializadora Mexicana Servicios, Bienes Médicos, Recursos, Administrativos

== History ==
The club was founded in 2007 when COMSBMRA, Inc. bought, with Ángeles de COMBSMRA y Ángeles de Tlahuac from the Tercera División de México, a second division franchise.

== See also ==
- Football in Mexico
