= Héctor Velázquez (footballer) =

Mexican footballer (born 1989)

Personal information
- Full name: Héctor Isidro Velázquez García
- Date of birth: 30 April 1989 (age 37)
- Place of birth: Badiraguato, Mexico
- Height: 1.66 m (5 ft 5 in)
- Position: Midfielder

Senior career*
| Years | Team | Apps | (Gls) |
| 2009–2017 | Dorados de Sinaloa | 113 | (7) |
| Total | | 113 | (7) |
- * Club domestic league appearances and goals

Héctor Isidro Velázquez García (Note: In this Spanish name, the first or paternal surname is Velázquez and the second or maternal family name is García.) (born 30 April 1989) is a former Mexican professional footballer who spent his entire career with Dorados de Sinaloa.

After arriving at the club in 2007, Velázquez initially played with the Dorados reserve teams in the Segunda División and Tercera División. He made his professional debut with the first team on 8 January 2010, coming on as a substitute during the final minutes of a Liga de Ascenso fixture against Guerreros de Hermosillo.

== Honours ==
=== Club ===
Dorados de Sinaloa

- Ascenso MX (2): Clausura 2015, Apertura 2016
- Copa MX (1): Apertura 2012
