= Víctor Perales =

Mexican footballer (born 1990)

Personal information
- Full name: Víctor Raúl Perales Aguilar
- Date of birth: November 7, 1990 (age 35)
- Place of birth: Fresnillo, Zacatecas, Mexico
- Height: 1.85 m (6 ft 1 in)
- Position: Centre back

Senior career*
| Years | Team | Apps | (Gls) |
| 2012–2014 | Guadalajara | 26 | (0) |
| 2014–2015 | Veracruz | 2 | (0) |
| 2016 | → Venados (loan) | 2 | (0) |
- * Club domestic league appearances and goals

Víctor Raúl Perales Aguilar (born November 7, 1990) is a former Mexican footballer. He last played as a centre back for Venados of the Ascenso MX.

== Club career ==
Perales played one season for K.R.C. Mechelen a Belgian Third Division team. Then he was sent on trial to the Chicago Fire a MLS team.

=== Club Deportivo Guadalajara ===
Víctor was one of the young promises of Club Deportivo Guadalajara and made 26 appearances without scoring.

=== Veracruz ===
On 29 May 2014 Guadalajara announced that Perales was traded to Veracruz along with money in exchange for Ángel Reyna.
