= Miguel Velázquez (footballer) =

Mexican footballer (born 1990)

Personal information
- Full name: Miguel Gerardo Velázquez Olivares
- Date of birth: 2 July 1990 (age 36)
- Place of birth: Tlalnepantla de Baz, Mexico
- Height: 1.70 m (5 ft 7 in)
- Position: Right-back

Team information
- Current team: Pachuca U-21 (Assistant)

Youth career
- 2008: Universidad del Fútbol
- 2009–2011: Alto Rendimiento Tuzo

Senior career*
Years	Team	Apps	(Gls)
2011–2012	Pachuca	11	(0)
2011–2012	→ Tulancingo (loan)	33	(4)
2013	→ Tecos (loan)	1	(0)
2013–2014	→ Altamira (loan)	27	(7)
2014–2020	Zacatecas	92	(0)
2018	→ León (loan)	0	(0)
2020	Atlético Jalisco	0	(0)
2021	Tlaxcala	9	(0)
2021	Jicaral	15	(0)
2022	Atlético Morelia	34	(0)
2023	Atlante	29	(4)

Managerial career
- 2025–: Pachuca Reserves and Academy
- * Club domestic league appearances and goals as of 15 May 2022

Miguel Gerardo Velázquez Olivares (Note: In this Spanish name, the first or paternal surname is Velázquez and the second or maternal family name is Olivares.) (born 2 July 1990) is a former Mexican professional footballer who last played as a right-back for Atlante.

== Honours ==
Morelia

- Liga de Expansión MX: Clausura 2022
