= F.C. Excelsior =

Futbol Club Excelsior
- Full name: Futbol Club Excelsior
- Founded: 2008
- Ground: Centro Deportivo Soriana, Monterrey, Nuevo León
- Capacity: 1,000
- Chairman: Sr. Sergio Oria Tovar
- Manager: (Mexico) Jesús Arellano
- Coach: (Mexico) Claudio Suárez
- League: Segunda División Profesional
Home colours	Away colours

F.C. Excelsior is a football club that plays in the Segunda División Profesional. The club is based in Monterrey, Nuevo León, Mexico.

== Current roster ==
As of June 14, 2010

Note: Flags indicate national team as defined under FIFA eligibility rules; some limited exceptions apply. Players may hold more than one non-FIFA nationality.

No.	Pos.	Nation	Player
1	GK	(Mexico) MEX	Jair de Jesús Garcia
2	DF	(Mexico) MEX	Marco AntonioRamos Martínez
3	DF	(Mexico) MEX	Miguel Curcó Alonso Moráles
4	DF	(Mexico) MEX	Juan Carlos Padilla
5	DF	(Mexico) MEX	Luis Ernesto Méndez García
6	DF	(Mexico) MEX	Moreno Bautista Salvador Gabriel
7	FW	(Mexico) MEX	Miguel Ángel Jaime Vela
8	MF	(Mexico) MEX	Saucedo García Edgar Iván
9	FW	(Mexico) MEX	Horacio Leal Montemayor
10	FW	(Mexico) MEX	Francisco Efraín Reynosa Barajas
11	MF	(Mexico) MEX	Eduardo Rodríguez Mosqueda
12	MF	(Mexico) MEX	Rodolfo García Ordáz
13	MF	(Mexico) MEX	Oscar Eduardo García Soto

No.	Pos.	Nation	Player
14	FW	(Mexico) MEX	Rodrigo Alejandro Lozano Ramírez
15	MF	(Mexico) MEX	Manuel Juárez Aguilar
16	MF	(Mexico) MEX	Jesús Palacios
17	MF	(Mexico) MEX	Jesús Irving
18	FW	(Mexico) MEX	Leyva Sánchez Reyes
20	MF	(Mexico) MEX	Jaime René Horta Salinas
21	MF	(Mexico) MEX	Raúl Humberto Gutiérrez González
23	FW	(Mexico) MEX	Gerardo García Garza
24	DF	(Mexico) MEX	Luis Eduardo Cárdenas Ramos
25	DF	(Mexico) MEX	Felipe de Jesús Pérez Rosales
26	DF	(Mexico) MEX	Jonathan Josué Ramírez González
27	GK	(Mexico) MEX	Efraín Alejandro Torres Silva
30	DF	(Mexico) MEX	Lorenzo Antonio Mendoza Castañeda
31	GK	(Mexico) MEX	Dieter Adrián Rodríguez Guajardo

== See also ==
- Football in Mexico
