= Luis Sánchez (Mexican footballer) =

Mexican footballer (born 1988)

Luis Alberto Sánchez
Personal information
- Full name: Luis Alberto Sánchez Rodríguez
- Date of birth: 6 February 1988 (age 38)
- Place of birth: Tijuana, Baja California, Mexico
- Height: 1.75 m (5 ft 9 in)
- Position: Winger

Youth career
- 2007–2010: Universidad del Fútbol

Senior career*
Years	Team	Apps	(Gls)
2010–2012	Pachuca	3	(0)
2010–2011	→ Tampico Madero (loan)	30	(17)
2011–2012	→ Tulancingo (loan)	40	(8)
2013	→ Estudiantes Tecos (loan)	5	(0)
2013–2016	Veracruz	69	(2)
2016–2018	→ Venados (loan)	58	(0)
2018	Celaya	11	(1)
2019–2020	Venados	33	(4)
2020	Los Cabos	0	(0)
- * Club domestic league appearances and goals as of 04:55, 24 January 2020 (UTC)

Luis Alberto Sánchez Rodríguez (born 6 February 1988) is a former Mexican footballer professional who last played for Venados F.C.

He played with Los Cabos of the Liga de Balompié Mexicano during the league's inaugural season in 2020–21.
