= 2019–20 Liga TDP season =

Liga TDP
- Season: 2019–20
- Dates: 6 September 2019 – 22 May 2020
- Champions: None
- Promoted: None
- Matches: 2,224
- Goals: 6,788 (3.05 per match)
- Top goalscorer: Diego Armando Núñez (31 goals)
- Stats are from the regular season only

The 2019–20 Liga TDP season is the fourth-tier football league of Mexico. The tournament began on 6 September 2019 and will finish in summer 2020. On April 7, 2020, the regular season was suspended due to COVID-19 pandemic. On 22 May 2020, the 2019–20 season was officially cancelled due to the pandemic affecting the country and no champion was crowned and no team was promoted to Liga Premier de México.

== Competition format ==
The Tercera División (Third Division) is divided into 13 groups. For the 2009/2010 season, the format of the tournament has been reorganized to a home and away format, which all teams will play in their respective group. The 13 groups consist of teams who are eligible to play in the liguilla de ascenso for one promotion spot, teams who are affiliated with teams in the Liga MX, Ascenso MX and Liga Premier, which are not eligible for promotion but will play that who the better filial team in an eight team filial playoff tournament for the entire season.

The league format allows participating franchises to rent their place to another team, so some clubs compete with a different name than the one registered with the FMF.

== Group 1 ==
Group with 15 teams from Campeche, Chiapas, Quintana Roo, Tabasco and Yucatán.

Location of teams in the 2019–20 Liga TDP Group 1 (Campeche)
Location of teams in the 2019–20 Liga TDP Group 1 (Quintana Roo)
Location of teams in the 2019–20 Liga TDP Group 1 (Chiapas and Tabasco)
Location of teams in the 2019–20 Liga TDP Group 1 (Yucatán)

=== Teams ===
Team	City	Home ground	Capacity	Affiliate	Official Name
Atlante	Cancún, Quintana Roo	CEDAR Cancún	500	Atlante	—
Campeche	Campeche, Campeche	La Muralla de Kin-Ha	500	—	—
Cantera Venados	Mérida, Yucatán	Carlos Iturralde	15,087	Venados	—
CEFOR Mérida	Maxcanú, Yucatán	Las Tres Cruces	1,000	—	—
Chocos de Tabasco	Villahermosa, Tabasco	Olímpico de Villahermosa	12,000	–	Monarcas Zacapu
Corsarios de Campeche	Campeche, Campeche	Universitario de Campeche	4,000	—	—
Cozumel Tres Toños	San Miguel de Cozumel, Quintana Roo	Unidad Deportiva Bicentenario	2,000	—	—
Delfines Márquez	Campeche, Campeche	Francisco Márquez Segovia	500	—	—
Deportiva Venados	Tamanché, Yucatán	Alonso Diego Molina	2,500	—	—
Felinos 48	Reforma, Chiapas	Sergio Lira Gallardo	600	—	—
Inter Playa del Carmen	Playa del Carmen, Quintana Roo	Unidad Deportiva Mario Villanueva Madrid	7,500	Inter Playa del Carmen	—
Mur	Motul, Yucatán	Unidad Deportiva Carrillo Puerto	1,000	—	—
Pejelagartos de Tabasco	Villahermosa, Tabasco	Olímpico de Villahermosa	12,000	—	—
Pioneros Junior	Cancún, Quintana Roo	Cancún 86	6,390	Pioneros de Cancún	—
Tigrillos de Chetumal	Chetumal, Quintana Roo	José López Portillo	6,600	—	—

=== League table ===
Pos	Team	Pld	W	D	L	GF	GA	GD	Pts
1	Atlante	22	14	5	3	39	10	+29	50
2	Pioneros Junior	22	16	1	5	58	21	+37	49
3	Chetumal	21	15	3	3	45	21	+24	49
4	Deportiva Venados	21	13	4	4	55	24	+31	47
5	Inter Playa del Carmen	21	12	5	4	37	19	+18	44
6	Cantera Venados	21	11	4	6	31	18	+13	39
7	Felinos 48	22	10	6	6	38	22	+16	38
8	Corsarios de Campeche	22	7	7	8	32	34	−2	31
9	Pejelagartos de Tabasco	21	8	5	8	34	35	−1	31
10	Mur	22	6	6	10	20	28	−8	28
11	Cozumel Tres Toños	21	5	5	11	30	44	−14	23
12	Campeche	21	5	6	10	27	44	−17	23
13	Chocos de Tabasco	22	4	4	14	18	42	−24	18
14	Delfines Márquez	22	3	2	17	14	52	−38	12
15	CEFOR Mérida	21	0	1	20	9	73	−64	1

Updated to match(es) played on April 7, 2020. Source: LigaTDP

== Group 2 ==
Group with 18 teams from Puebla and Veracruz. Note: Albinegros de Orizaba (disaffiliated on December 18, 2019; will not participate in Clausura 2020)

=== Teams ===
Location of teams in the 2019–20 Liga TDP Group 2 (Puebla)
Location of teams in the 2019–20 Liga TDP Group 2 (Veracruz)

Team	City	Home ground	Capacity	Affiliate	Official Name
Académicos UGM	Orizaba, Veracruz	Universitario UGM Orizaba	1,500	—	—
Atlético Boca del Río	Boca del Río, Veracruz	Unidad Deportiva Hugo Sánchez	2,500	—	—
Alpha	Puebla, Puebla	Club Alpha Cancha 3	600	—	—
Cafetaleros de Córdoba	Córdoba, Veracruz	Rafael Murillo Vidal	3,800	—	—
Delfines UGM	Nogales, Veracruz	UGM Nogales	1,500	—	—
Fuertes de Fortín	Fortín de las Flores, Veracruz	Unidad Deportiva Eliezer Morales	1,000	—	Santos Córdoba
Guerreros de Cholula	San Andrés Cholula, Puebla	Deportivo Cholula	1,000	—	Guerreros Pericués
Lobos Chapultepec	Puebla, Puebla	Campo Filial Toluca Puebla	500	—	—
Los Ángeles	Puebla, Puebla	Ex Hacienda San José Maravillas	500	—	—
Papanes de Papantla	Papantla, Veracruz	Fénix Solidaridad	3,000	—	—
Petroleros de Poza Rica	Poza Rica, Veracruz	Heriberto Jara Corona	10,000	—	—
Reales de Puebla	Chachapa, Puebla	Unidad Deportiva Chachapa	1,000	—	—
SEP Puebla	Puebla, Puebla	Ex Hacienda San José Maravillas	500	Puebla	—
Tehuacán	Tehuacán, Puebla	Polideportivo La Huizachera	1,000	—	—
Toros Xalapa	Xalapa, Veracruz	Antonio M. Quirasco	2,000	—	Toros Huatusco
Tuxpan	Tuxpan, Veracruz	Álvaro Lorenzo Fernández	2,500	—	—
Zaragoza	Puebla, Puebla	Ex Hacienda San José Maravillas	500	—	—

=== League table ===
Pos	Team	Pld	W	D	L	GF	GA	GD	Pts
1	Poza Rica	26	15	8	3	57	24	+33	57
2	Lobos Chapultepec	26	16	6	4	63	24	+39	55
3	Académicos UGM	25	15	6	4	53	22	+31	54
4	Papanes de Papantla	25	15	6	4	74	31	+43	53
5	Alpha	25	13	7	5	53	21	+32	51
6	Delfines UGM	26	13	5	8	52	40	+12	49
7	Tuxpan	25	11	8	6	55	28	+27	46
8	Fuertes de Fortín	25	12	8	5	41	24	+17	45
9	Cafetaleros de Córdoba	25	10	6	9	46	34	+12	41
10	Guerreros de Cholula	25	11	4	10	34	36	−2	41
11	SEP Puebla	26	9	7	10	39	49	−10	36
12	Los Ángeles	26	8	6	12	30	33	−3	33
13	Reales de Puebla	26	9	4	13	35	44	−9	32
14	Atlético Boca del Río	26	5	7	14	27	48	−21	24
15	Zaragoza	25	5	1	19	22	80	−58	17
16	Tehuacán	25	2	3	20	23	79	−56	11
17	Toros Xalapa	25	1	0	24	12	99	−87	3
18	Albinegros de Orizaba	0	0	0	0	0	0	0	0

Updated to match(es) played on April 7, 2020. Source: LigaTDP

== Group 3 ==
Group with 12 teams from Chiapas, Oaxaca and Veracruz.

=== Teams ===
Location of teams in the 2019–20 Liga TDP Group 3 (Chiapas)
Location of teams in the 2019–20 Liga TDP Group 3 (Oaxaca and Veracruz)

Team	City	Home ground	Capacity	Affiliate	Official name
Alebrijes de Oaxaca	Oaxaca, Oaxaca	Tecnológico de Oaxaca	14,598	Alebrijes de Oaxaca	–
Atlético Isla	Isla, Veracruz	Campo Municipal de Isla	1,000	—	–
Atlético Ixtepec	Ixtepec, Oaxaca	Brena Torres	1,000	—	–
Cafetaleros de Chiapas	Motozintla, Chiapas	El Copal	3,000	Cafetaleros de Chiapas	–
CEFOR Chiapas	Tuxtla Gutiérrez, Chiapas	Flor de Sospo	3,000	–	–
Chapulineros de Oaxaca	San Jerónimo Tlacochahuaya, Oaxaca	Independiente MRCI	3,000	Chapulineros de Oaxaca	–
Chileros XL	Xalapa, Veracruz	Antonio M. Quirasco	2,000	–	–
Conejos de Tuxtepec	Tuxtepec, Oaxaca	Ing. Guillermo Hernández Castro	4,000	—	–
Cruz Azul Lagunas	Lagunas, Oaxaca	Cruz Azul	1,000	Cruz Azul	–
Jaguares Negros UDS	Comitán de Domínguez, Chiapas	Roberto Ortíz Solís	2,000	—	—
Porteños	Salina Cruz, Oaxaca	Heriberto Kehoe Vincent	2,000	—	—
Sozca	Lerdo de Tejada, Veracruz	Miguel Seoane Lavín	1,000	—	—

=== League table ===
Pos	Team	Pld	W	D	L	GF	GA	GD	Pts
1	Cafetaleros de Chiapas	15	12	2	1	35	5	+30	39
2	Cruz Azul Lagunas	15	8	6	1	17	6	+11	32
3	Atlético Isla	14	7	5	2	24	11	+13	28
4	Porteños	15	7	3	5	24	21	+3	25
5	Sozca	15	5	5	5	18	16	+2	23
6	Alebrijes de Oaxaca	15	4	5	6	22	19	+3	20
7	Conejos de Tuxtepec	15	5	2	8	16	16	0	19
8	Atlético Ixtepec	15	4	5	6	10	18	−8	19
9	CEFOR Chiapas	15	4	4	7	13	23	−10	17
10	Chileros XL	14	4	3	7	12	31	−19	17
11	Chapulineros de Oaxaca	15	2	5	8	15	27	−12	14
12	Jaguares Negros UDS	15	3	3	9	13	26	−13	14

Updated to match(es) played on April 7, 2020. Source: LigaTDP

== Group 4 ==
Group with 18 teams from Mexico City and Greater Mexico City.

=== Teams ===
Location of teams in the 2019–20 Liga TDP Group 4

Team	City	Home ground	Capacity	Affiliate	Official name
Álamos	Venustiano Carranza, Mexico City	Magdalena Mixhuca Sports City	500	–	–
Ángeles de la Ciudad	Iztacalco, Mexico City	Deportivo Rosario Iglesias	6,000	–	–
Atlético Estado de México	Huehuetoca, State of México	12 de Mayo	1,500	–	–
Aragón	Gustavo A. Madero, Mexico City	Deportivo Francisco Zarco	500	Pachuca	Atlético San Juan de Aragón
Atlético Mineros CDMX	Iztacalco, Mexico City	Deportivo Eduardo Molina	500	Mineros de Zacatecas	Novillos Neza
Aztecas AMF Soccer	Gustavo A. Madero, Mexico City	Deportivo Francisco Zarco	500	–	–
Chilangos	Benito Juárez, Mexico City	Deportivo Benito Juárez	1,000	–	–
Club Carsaf	Gustavo A. Madero, Mexico City	Deportivo Lázaro Cárdenas	1,000	–	–
Cuervos Blancos	Cuautitlán, State of Mexico	Los Pinos	5,000	–	–
Escuela de Alto Rendimiento	Huixquilucan de Degollado, State of Mexico	Universidad Anáhuac México Norte	300	–	–
Leopardos	Iztapalapa, Mexico City	Leandro Valle	1,500	–	–
Marina	Xochimilco, Mexico City	Valentín González	5,000	Marina	–
Politécnico	Venustiano Carranza, Mexico City	Deportivo Eduardo Molina	500	–	–
Promodep Central	Xochimilco, Mexico City	Valentín González	5,000	–	–
R-Reyes	Miguel Hidalgo, Mexico City	Deportivo Plan Sexenal	1,000	–	–
Sangre de Campeón	Tultitlán, State of Mexico	Cancha Nou Camp	1,000	–	–
Valle de Xico	Valle de Chalco, State of Mexico	Unidad Deportiva Luis Donaldo Colosio	3,000	–	–
Yalmakán	Gustavo A. Madero, Mexico City	Deportivo Lázaro Cárdenas	1,000	Yalmakán	–

=== League table ===
Pos	Team	Pld	W	D	L	GF	GA	GD	Pts
1	Aragón F.C.	27	15	9	3	67	28	+39	60
2	Chilangos	27	14	7	6	65	25	+40	52
3	Atlético Estado de México	27	15	5	7	39	27	+12	52
4	Ángeles de la Ciudad	27	13	7	7	35	21	+14	49
5	Club Carsaf	27	7	16	4	32	20	+12	48
6	Cuervos Blancos	27	12	8	7	33	24	+9	46
7	Escuela de Alto Rendimiento	27	9	12	6	35	29	+6	46
8	Yalmakán	27	13	5	9	36	32	+4	44
9	Leopardos	27	7	10	10	32	37	−5	39
10	Promodep Central	27	8	10	9	27	34	−7	39
11	R-Reyes	27	9	8	10	32	37	−5	38
12	Álamos	27	9	7	11	31	40	−9	37
13	Atlético Mineros CDMX	27	8	9	10	28	39	−11	37
14	Marina	27	7	8	12	22	33	−11	34
15	Valle de Xico	27	8	5	14	30	41	−11	32
16	Sangre de Campeón	27	7	5	15	23	52	−29	30
17	Politécnico	27	6	7	14	31	55	−24	27
18	Aztecas AMF Soccer	27	2	10	15	14	38	−24	19

Updated to match(es) played on April 7, 2020. Source: LigaTDP

== Group 5 ==
Location of teams in the 2018–19 Liga TDP Group 5

Group with 15 teams from Mexico City and State of Mexico.

=== Teams ===
Team	City	Home ground	Capacity	Affiliate	Official name
Azucareros de Tezonapa	Melchor Ocampo, State of Mexico	Deportivo Municipal Melchor Ocampo	1,000	–	–
Azul Oceanía	Venustiano Carranza, Mexico City	Deportivo Oceanía	1,000	–	–
Cuervos de Silver Soccer	Xochimilco, Mexico City	San Isidro	1,000	–	–
Diablos Valle de Bravo	Valle de Bravo, State of Mexico	Unidad Deportiva Monte Alto	1,000	Toluca	Deportivo Vallesano FC
Estudiantes de El Oro	El Oro de Hidalgo, State of Mexico	Unidad Deportiva Miguel Hidalgo	2,000	–	–
Fuerza Mazahua	Tenancingo, State of Mexico	JM "Grillo" Cruzalta	3,000	–	–
Halcones de Rayón	Rayón, State of Mexico	José Lerma Pérez	1,000	–	–
Halcones Zúñiga	Nicolás Romero, State of Mexico	Deportivo San Ildelfonso	1,000	UdeG	–
Leones	Zinacantepec, State of Mexico	San Luis Mextepec	2,500	–	–
Metepec	Metepec, State of Mexico	Jesús Lara	1,500	–	–
Potros UAEM	Toluca, State of Mexico	Alberto "Chivo" Córdoba	32,603	–	–
Pumas UNAM	Coyoacán, Mexico City	La Cantera	2,000	UNAM	–
Real Villaflor	Villa Guerrero, State of Mexico	Municipal de Villa Guerrero	1,500	–	Apaseo El Alto
Reboceros de Tenancingo	Tenancingo, State of Mexico	JM "Grillo" Cruzalta	3,000	–	Grupo Sherwood
Tejupilco	Tejupilco, State of Mexico	Unidad Deportiva Tejupilco	1,000	–	–

=== League table ===
Pos	Team	Pld	W	D	L	GF	GA	GD	Pts
1	Cuervos Silver Soccer	22	12	7	3	29	18	+11	50
2	Pumas UNAM	21	14	5	2	42	16	+26	49
3	Diablos Valle de Bravo	22	12	7	3	43	19	+24	47
4	Potros UAEM	21	13	4	4	50	20	+30	44
5	Halcones de Rayón	22	11	5	6	30	24	+6	40
6	Halcones Zúñiga	21	12	2	7	41	26	+15	39
7	Tejupilco	21	9	4	8	34	31	+3	34
8	Real Villaflor	21	10	3	8	24	35	−11	34
9	Fuerza Mazahua	21	4	10	7	18	26	−8	26
10	Estudiantes	22	5	6	11	17	27	−10	26
11	Deportivo Leones	21	5	8	8	20	23	−3	25
12	Metepec	22	3	9	10	11	29	−18	22
13	Azucareros de Tezonapa	22	5	4	13	24	44	−20	21
14	Reboceros de Tenancingo	21	2	7	12	16	30	−14	16
15	Azul Oceanía	22	1	5	16	11	42	−31	10

Updated to match(es) played on April 7, 2020. Source: LigaTDP

== Group 6 ==
Group with 11 teams from Guerrero, Mexico City, Morelos, Puebla and State of Mexico.

=== Teams ===
Location of teams in the 2019–20 Liga TDP Group 6 (Mexico City, Morelos and Puebla)
Location of teams in the 2019–20 Liga TDP Group 6 (Guerrero)

Team	City	Home ground	Capacity	Affiliate
Academia Cuextlán	Xochimilco, Mexico City	Valentín González	5,000	–
Águilas UAGro	Acapulco, Guerrero	Unidad Deportiva Acapulco	13,000	–
Atlético Cuernavaca	Cuernavaca, Morelos	Unidad Deportiva San Carlos	1,000	–
Chilpancingo	Chilpancingo, Guerrero	David Josué García Evangelista	2,000	–
Guerreros de Puebla	Puebla City, Puebla	Centro Estatal del Deporte Mario Vázquez Raña	800	–
Iguanas	Zihuatanejo, Guerrero	Unidad Deportiva Zihuatanejo	1,000	–
JFS Yautepec	Yautepec, Morelos	Unidad Deportiva San Carlos	1,000	–
Leones Amecameca	Amecameca, State of Mexico	Francisco Flores	3,000	–
Puebla	Puebla, Puebla	Olímpico Ignacio Zaragoza	22,000	Puebla
Selva Cañera	Jojutla, Morelos	Unidad Deportiva La Perseverancia	1,000	–
Zacatepec	Zacatepec, Morelos	Agustín "Coruco" Díaz	24,313	Zacatepec

=== League table ===
Pos	Team	Pld	W	D	L	GF	GA	GD	Pts
1	Atlético Cuernavaca	24	16	5	3	52	26	+26	55
2	Águilas UAGro	24	14	5	5	66	30	+36	51
3	Puebla	23	13	5	5	48	25	+23	45
4	Academia Cuextlán	24	12	5	7	36	22	+14	43
5	Selva Cañera	24	10	5	9	36	31	+5	38
6	Iguanas	24	9	6	9	28	28	0	37
7	Chilpancingo	23	11	1	11	42	39	+3	34
8	Guerreros de Puebla	23	8	4	11	30	35	−5	30
9	Zacatepec	24	7	5	12	32	40	−8	30
10	JFS Yautepec	23	3	8	12	25	43	−18	19
11	Leones Amecameca	24	1	3	20	11	87	−76	7

Updated to match(es) played on April 7, 2020. Source: LigaTDP

== Group 7 ==
Group with 16 teams from Hidalgo, Mexico City, Puebla and State of Mexico.

=== Teams ===
Location of teams in the 2019–20 Liga TDP Group 7 (Hidalgo and Puebla)
Location of teams in the 2019–20 Liga TDP Group 7 (State of Mexico)

Team	City	Home ground	Capacity	Affiliate	Official name
Águilas de Teotihuacán	San Martín de las Pirámides, State of Mexico	Deportivo Braulio Romero	1,000	–	–
Atlético Tlaxiaca	San Agustín Tlaxiaca, Hidalgo	Parque San Agustín	1,000	Pachuca	–
CEFOR "Chaco" Giménez	Tulancingo, Hidalgo	Primero de Mayo	2,500	–	–
CEFOR Cuauhtémoc Blanco	Huauchinango, Puebla	Nido Águila Huauchinango	300	–	–
Ciervos	Chalco, State of Mexico	Arreola	2,500	Ciervos	–
Cuemanco	Iztacalco, Mexico City	Magdalena Mixhuca Sports City	500	–	Santiago Tulantepec F.C.
Faraones de Texcoco	Texcoco, State of Mexico	Claudio Suárez	4,000	–	–
Halcones Negros	Texcoco, State of Mexico	Unidad Deportiva Silverio Pérez	1,000	–	–
Hidalguense	Pachuca, Hidalgo	Club Hidalguense	600	–	–
Independiente Mexiquense	Huehuetoca, State of Mexico	12 de Mayo	1,500	–	–
Matamoros	Tultitlán, State of Mexico	ESMAC	500	–	–
Sk Sport Street Soccer	Tulancingo, Hidalgo	Unidad Deportiva Javier Rojo Gómez	2,000	–	–
Texcoco	Papalotla, State of Mexico	Centro de Fútbol Pato Baeza	1,000	–	–
Tuzos Pachuca	San Agustín Tlaxiaca, Hidalgo	Universidad del Fútbol	1,000	Pachuca	–
Unión Acolman	Acolman, State of Mexico	San Carlos Tepexpan	1,200	–	–
Universidad del Fútbol	San Agustín Tlaxiaca, Hidalgo	Universidad del Fútbol	1,000	Pachuca	–

=== League table ===
Pos	Team	Pld	W	D	L	GF	GA	GD	Pts
1	Faraones de Texcoco	23	17	3	3	86	34	+52	57
2	Tuzos Pachuca	23	17	3	3	77	18	+59	56
3	Universidad del Fútbol	23	16	3	4	85	30	+55	53
4	Halcones Negros	23	14	4	5	63	29	+34	48
5	CEFOR Cuauhtémoc Blanco	23	12	6	5	61	31	+30	45
6	Sk Sport Street Soccer	23	12	5	6	39	23	+16	43
7	Atlético Tlaxiaca	23	10	7	6	41	38	+3	41
8	Hidalguense	23	7	8	8	35	37	−2	32
9	Unión Acolman	23	8	7	8	31	50	−19	32
10	Independiente Mexiquense	23	7	6	10	35	46	−11	30
11	CEFOR "Chaco" Giménez	23	8	3	12	32	53	−21	29
12	Cuemanco	22	5	5	12	24	52	−28	23
13	Ciervos	23	4	6	13	25	51	−26	22
14	Matamoros	23	4	5	14	27	59	−32	19
15	Texcoco	23	2	2	19	23	95	−72	10
16	Águilas de Teotihuacán	22	2	3	17	27	65	−38	9

Updated to match(es) played on April 7, 2020. Source: LigaTDP

== Group 8 ==
Group with 15 teams from Guanajuato, Michoacán and Querétaro.

=== Teams ===
Location of teams in the 2019–20 Liga TDP Group 8 (Guanajuato and Querétaro)
Location of teams in the 2019–20 Liga TDP Group 8 (Michoacán)

Team	City	Home ground	Capacity	Affiliate	Official name
4D Morelia	Morelia, Michoacán	Venustiano Carranza	17,600	–	Tigres Blancos Gestalt
Celaya	Celaya, Guanajuato	Miguel Alemán Valdés	23,182	Celaya	–
Cocodrilos Lázaro Cárdenas	Lázaro Cárdenas, Michoacán	Club Pacífico	2,500	–	–
Delfines de Abasolo	Abasolo, Guanajuato	Municipal de Abasolo	2,500	–	–
Fundadores de Querétaro	Querétaro, Querétaro	Unidad Deportiva La Cañada	1,000	–	–
La Piedad	La Piedad, Michoacán	Juan N. López	13,356	Reboceros de La Piedad	–
Lobos ITECA	Querétaro, Querétaro	Parque Bicentenario	1,000	–	–
Jaibos Cortazar	Cortazar, Guanajuato	Unidad Deportiva Sur	1,000	–	Deportivo Soria
Real Querétaro	Huimilpan, Querétaro	Peña Madridista Emilio Butragueño	1,000	–	–
Sahuayo	Sahuayo, Michoacán	Unidad Deportiva Municipal	1,500	–	–
Salamanca	Salamanca, Guanajuato	El Molinito	2,500	–	–
Tiburones Freseros	Pénjamo, Guanajuato	Pablo Herrera	2,000	–	–
Titanes de Querétaro	Querétaro, Querétaro	Unidad Deportiva La Cañada	1,000	–	–
Yurécuaro	Yurécuaro, Michoacán	Unidad Deportiva Centenario	1,000	–	–
Zorros de Cadereyta	Cadereyta de Montes, Querétaro	Unidad Deportiva Cadereyta	1,000	–	San Juan del Río

=== League table ===
Pos	Team	Pld	W	D	L	GF	GA	GD	Pts
1	Celaya	22	17	4	1	61	21	+40	58
2	Jaibos Cortazar	20	13	3	4	24	11	+13	45
3	Cocodrilos Lázaro Cárdenas	21	9	9	3	30	20	+10	42
4	Salamanca	21	12	4	5	32	16	+16	41
5	Delfines de Abasolo	22	10	6	6	41	29	+12	39
6	La Piedad	22	8	9	5	33	21	+12	37
7	Real Querétaro	21	7	8	6	23	21	+2	34
8	Yurécuaro	22	8	7	7	25	27	−2	34
9	4D Morelia	22	6	6	10	25	35	−10	29
10	Lobos ITECA	21	8	3	10	31	37	−6	28
11	Sahuayo	21	6	4	11	28	36	−8	23
12	Titanes de Querétaro	20	7	2	11	29	38	−9	23
13	Tiburones Freseros	21	4	6	11	18	24	−6	20
14	Zorros de Cadereyta	21	2	6	13	15	29	−14	14
15	Fundadores de Querétaro	21	2	3	16	7	57	−50	10

Updated to match(es) played on April 7, 2020. Source: LigaTDP

== Group 9 ==
Group with 9 teams from Durango, Guanajuato, Jalisco and Zacatecas.

=== Teams ===
Location of teams in the 2019–20 Liga TDP Group 9 (Guanajuato and Jalisco)
Location of teams in the 2019–20 Liga TDP Group 9 (Zacatecas)
Location of teams in the 2019–20 Liga TDP Group 9 (Durango)

Team	City	Home ground	Capacity	Affiliate	Official name
Alacranes de Durango	Durango, Durango	Francisco Zarco	18,000	Alacranes de Durango	–
Atlético Leonés	León, Guanajuato	CODE Las Joyas	1,000	–	–
Durazneros de Jerez	Jerez, Zacatecas	Ramón López Velarde	2,000	–	FC Zacatecas
Empresarios del Rincón	Purísima del Rincón, Guanajuato	Unidad Deportiva de Purísima	1,000	–	Real Olmeca Sport
Mineros de Fresnillo	Fresnillo, Zacatecas	Minera Fresnillo	6,000	Mineros de Fresnillo	–
Mineros de Zacatecas	Guadalupe, Zacatecas	Unidad Deportiva Guadalupe	500	Mineros de Zacatecas	–
San Pancho	San Francisco del Rincón, Guanajuato	Deportiva J. Jesús Rodríguez Barba	1,000	–	CH Fútbol Club
Somnus	Lagos de Moreno, Jalisco	Club Somnus	2,000	–	Real Magarí
Tuzos UAZ	Zacatecas, Zacatecas	Universitario Unidad Deportiva Norte	5,000	Tuzos UAZ	–

=== League table ===
Pos	Team	Pld	W	D	L	GF	GA	GD	Pts
1	Tuzos UAZ	17	13	3	1	47	10	+37	43
2	Atlético Leonés	17	11	3	3	44	24	+20	38
3	Mineros de Zacatecas	18	11	2	5	54	32	+22	36
4	San Pancho FC	18	11	1	6	35	24	+11	34
5	Durazneros de Jerez	18	8	5	5	24	23	+1	31
6	Somnus	18	5	3	10	23	45	−22	21
7	Empresarios del Rincón	18	4	4	10	20	32	−12	17
8	Mineros de Fresnillo	18	2	4	12	23	41	−18	11
9	Alacranes de Durango	18	1	3	14	10	49	−39	9

Updated to match(es) played on April 7, 2020. Source: LigaTDP

== Group 10 ==
Group with 20 teams from Colima and Jalisco. Note: Loros UdeC (dissolved on December 27, 2019; will not participate in Clausura 2020) for that reason, Atlético Manzanillo was relocated in Colima City and renamed as Real Colima.

=== Teams ===
Location of teams in the 2019–20 Liga TDP Group 10

Team	City	Home ground	Capacity	Affiliate	Official name
Acatlán	Acatlán de Juárez, Jalisco	Club Juárez	1,500	–	–
Ayense	Ayotlán, Jalisco	Chino Rivas	4,000	–	–
CAFESSA	Tlajomulco de Zúñiga, Jalisco	Unidad Deportiva Mariano Otero	3,000	CAFESSA	–
Catedráticos Élite	Etzatlán, Jalisco	Unidad Deportiva Etzatlán	1,000	–	–
Charales de Chapala	Chapala, Jalisco	Municipal Juan Rayo	1,000	–	–
Deportivo Salcido	Ocotlán, Jalisco	Complejo Salcido	1,000	–	–
Diablos Tesistán	Zapopan, Jalisco	Club Diablos Tesistán	1,000	–	Valle del Grullo
Escuela de Fútbol Chivas	Zapopan, Jalisco	Verde Valle	800	Guadalajara	–
Gallos Viejos	Zapopan, Jalisco	Club Pumas Tesistán	1,000	–	–
Gorilas de Juanacatlán	Juanacatlán, Jalisco	Club Juanacatlán	500	–	–
Leones Negros UdeG	Zapopan, Jalisco	Club Deportivo U. de G.	3,000	Leones Negros UdeG	–
Loros UdeC	Colima City, Colima	Olímpico Universitario de Colima	11,923	Loros UdeC	–
Nacional	Guadalajara, Jalisco	Olímpico Parque Solidaridad	1,000	–	–
Oro	Zapopan, Jalisco	Club Hacienda Real	1,000	–	–
Picudos de Manzanillo	Zapopan, Jalisco	Instalaciones Nápoles Tapatío	500	–	–
Real Ánimas de Sayula	Sayula, Jalisco	Gustavo Díaz Ordaz	1,000	–	–
Real Colima	Colima City, Colima	Colima	12,000	–	Atlético Tecomán
Tapatíos Soccer	Guadalajara, Jalisco	Colegio Once México	1,000	–	–
Tepatitlán	Tepatitlán de Morelos, Jalisco	Gregorio "Tepa" Gómez	12,500	Tepatitlán	–
Tornados Tlaquepaque	Tlaquepaque, Jalisco	San Andrés	2,500	–	Atlético Cocula

=== League table ===
Pos	Team	Pld	W	D	L	GF	GA	GD	Pts
1	CAFESSA	28	19	6	3	58	26	+32	67
2	Gorilas de Juanacatlán	29	18	4	7	68	41	+27	61
3	Leones Negros UdeG	28	16	8	4	60	22	+38	59
4	Acatlán	29	16	6	7	55	34	+21	57
5	Catedráticos Élite	28	15	7	6	50	31	+19	57
6	Tapatíos Soccer	28	13	10	5	47	27	+20	55
7	Diablos Tesistán	29	14	9	6	43	27	+16	55
8	Oro	28	12	7	9	47	37	+10	48
9	Escuela de Fútbol Chivas	29	11	9	9	43	43	0	47
10	Tepatitlán	28	11	4	13	48	50	−2	40
11	Real Ánimas de Sayula	29	10	7	12	39	44	−5	40
12	Ayense	28	9	9	10	31	45	−14	39
13	Tornados Tlaquepaque	28	10	4	14	28	36	−8	35
14	Real Colima	29	7	8	14	37	41	−4	33
15	Deportivo Salcido	28	8	7	13	32	38	−6	32
16	Nacional	28	8	3	17	37	61	−24	29
17	Gallos Viejos	28	5	6	17	39	72	−33	23
18	Picudos de Manzanillo	29	5	4	20	32	65	−33	22
19	Charales de Chapala	29	2	4	23	17	71	−54	11
20	Loros UdeC	0	0	0	0	0	0	0	0

Updated to match(es) played on April 7, 2020. Source: LigaTDP

== Group 11 ==
Group with 17 teams from Jalisco, Nayarit and Sinaloa.

=== Teams ===
Location of teams in the 2019–20 Liga TDP Group 11 (Jalisco and Nayarit)
Location of teams in the 2019–20 Liga TDP Group 11 (Sinaloa)

Team	City	Home ground	Capacity	Affiliate	Official name
Águilas UAS	Culiacán, Sinaloa	Universitario UAS	3,500	–	–
Agaveros	Tlajomulco de Zúñiga, Jalisco	Campos Elite	1,000	–	–
Atlas	El Salto, Jalisco	CECAF	500	Atlas	–
Atlético Bahía	Bahía de Banderas, Nayarit	Ciudad Deportiva San José del Valle	4,000	Atlético Bahía	–
CAFESSA Tonalá	Tonalá, Jalisco	Unidad Deportiva Revolución Mexicana	3,000	CAFESSA	–
Caja Oblatos	Guadalajara, Jalisco	Deportivo Tonalá	1,000	–	–
CEFUT	Zapopan, Jalisco	Club CEFUT	600	–	–
Deportivo Cimagol	Tlaquepaque, Jalisco	Club Vaqueros Ixtlán	1,000	–	–
Deportivo Tala	Tala, Jalisco	Centro Deportivo y Cultural 24 de Marzo	3,000	–	Volcanes de Colima
Dorados de Sinaloa	Culiacán, Sinaloa	Unidad Deportiva Sagarpa	1,000	Dorados de Sinaloa	–
Guadalajara	Zapopan, Jalisco	Verde Valle	800	Guadalajara	–
Mazorqueros de Zapotlán	Ciudad Guzmán, Jalisco	Municipal Santa Rosa	3,500	–	–
Puerto Vallarta	Puerto Vallarta, Jalisco	Municipal Agustín Flores Contreras	3,000	–	–
Sufacen Tepic	Tepic, Nayarit	Club Sufacen Libramiento	500	–	–
Tecos	Zapopan, Jalisco	Tres de Marzo	18,779	Tecos	–
Venados de Atemajac	Atemajac de Brizuela, Jalisco	Unidad Deportiva Ulises Dávila	1,000	–	Alcaldes de Lagos
Xalisco	Xalisco, Nayarit	Nicolás Álvarez Ortega	12,945	–	–

=== League table ===
Pos	Team	Pld	W	D	L	GF	GA	GD	Pts
1	Atlas	24	17	4	3	65	20	+45	59
2	Mazorqueros de Zapotlán	25	16	4	5	59	26	+33	54
3	Sufacen Tepic	25	17	2	6	60	33	+27	54
4	Guadalajara	26	15	3	8	55	34	+21	50
5	Tecos	26	14	4	8	42	21	+21	48
6	CEFUT	25	14	3	8	60	40	+20	46
7	Deportivo Tala	25	12	6	7	56	30	+26	45
8	Xalisco	25	11	6	8	43	41	+2	44
9	CAFESSA Tonalá	26	10	8	8	36	31	+5	40
10	Dorados de Sinaloa	25	10	6	9	28	29	−1	40
11	Puerto Vallarta	25	10	6	9	48	44	+4	39
12	Águilas UAS	25	9	8	8	38	33	+5	37
13	Deportivo Cimagol	26	6	3	17	25	66	−41	22
14	Caja Oblatos	26	5	3	18	25	66	−41	21
15	Venados de Atemajac	25	5	3	17	18	49	−31	19
16	Atlético Bahía	26	3	3	20	15	71	−56	14
17	Agaveros	25	2	6	17	11	50	−39	13

Updated to match(es) played on April 7, 2020. Source: LigaTDP

== Group 12 ==
Group with 14 teams from Coahuila, Nuevo León and Tamaulipas.

=== Teams ===
Location of teams in the 2019–20 Liga TDP Group 12 (Tamaulipas)
Location of teams in the 2019–20 Liga TDP Group 12 (Nuevo León)
Location of teams in the 2019–20 Liga TDP Group 12 (Coahuila)

Team	City	Home ground	Capacity	Affiliate	Official name
Atlético Altamira	Altamira, Tamaulipas	Lázaro Cárdenas	2,500	–	–
Bravos de Nuevo Laredo	Nuevo Laredo, Tamaulipas	Unidad Deportiva Benito Juárez	5,000	–	–
Correcaminos UAT	Ciudad Victoria, Tamaulipas	Universitario Eugenio Alvizo Porras	5,000	Correcaminos UAT	–
FCD Bulls Santiago	Santiago, Nuevo León	FCD El Barrial	570	FC Dallas	–
Frontera RP	Río Bravo, Tamaulipas	Las Liebres	1,000	–	–
Gavilanes de Matamoros	Matamoros, Tamaulipas	El Hogar	22,000	Gavilanes de Matamoros	Ho Gar H Matamoros
Jabatos Nuevo León	Allende, Nuevo León	Parque Bicentenario	1,000	–	Bucaneros de Matamoros
Real Acuña	Ciudad Acuña, Coahuila	Pista Eduardo Moreira	1,000	–	–
Regio Soccer	Monterrey, Nuevo León	Ciudad Deportiva Churubusco	1,000	Querétaro	Real San Cosme
Orgullo Surtam	Tampico, Tamaulipas	Olímpico de Ciudad Madero	6,000	–	–
Saltillo SFC	Saltillo, Coahuila	Olímpico Francisco I. Madero	7,000	Saltillo SFC	Saltillo Soccer
San Nicolás	San Nicolás de los Garza, Nuevo León	Unidad Deportiva Oriente	1,000	–	–
Tigres SD	General Zuazua, Nuevo León	La Cueva de Zuazua	800	Tigres UANL	–
Troyanos UDEM	San Pedro Garza García, Nuevo León	Universidad de Monterrey	1,000	–	–

=== League table ===
Pos	Team	Pld	W	D	L	GF	GA	GD	Pts
1	FCD Bulls de Santiago	19	14	3	2	50	12	+38	48
2	Orgullo Surtam	19	11	5	3	45	16	+29	41
3	Bravos de Nuevo Laredo	18	10	4	4	27	16	+11	35
4	Tigres SD	19	11	1	7	36	21	+15	34
5	San Nicolás	19	8	5	6	29	19	+10	33
6	Saltillo SFC	19	7	9	3	36	18	+18	31
7	Correcaminos UAT	18	8	3	7	21	14	+7	30
8	Frontera FC	19	6	5	8	22	24	−2	28
9	Troyanos UDEM	17	8	3	6	28	15	+13	27
10	Real Acuña	19	8	2	9	27	34	−7	26
11	Gavilanes de Matamoros	18	6	4	8	25	27	−2	23
12	Atlético Altamira	19	4	3	12	16	40	−24	17
13	Regio Soccer	17	2	2	13	20	70	−50	10
14	Jabatos Nuevo León	18	1	1	16	16	72	−56	4

Updated to match(es) played on April 7, 2020. Source: LigaTDP

== Group 13 ==
Group with 7 teams from Chihuahua and Sonora.

=== Teams ===
Location of teams in the 2019–20 Liga TDP Group 13

Team	City	Home ground	Capacity	Affiliate	Official name
Cimarrones de Sonora	Hermosillo, Sonora	Miguel Castro Servín	4,000	Cimarrones de Sonora	–
Cobras Fut Premier	Ciudad Juárez, Chihuahua	20 de Noviembre	2,500	–	–
CEPROFFA	Ciudad Juárez, Chihuahua	CEPROFFA	1,000	–	–
Guaymas	Guaymas, Sonora	Unidad Deportiva Julio Alfonso	3,000	–	–
Huatabampo	Navojoa, Sonora	Olímpico de Navojoa	4,000	–	–
La Tribu de Ciudad Juárez	Ciudad Juárez, Chihuahua	20 de Noviembre	2,500	–	–
Tijuana	Hermosillo, Sonora	Miguel Castro Servín	4,000	Tijuana	–

=== League table ===
Pos	Team	Pld	W	D	L	GF	GA	GD	Pts
1	La Tribu de Ciudad Juárez	18	14	3	1	30	9	+21	45
2	Cimarrones de Sonora	18	14	1	3	36	13	+23	44
3	Tijuana	18	9	5	4	27	17	+10	35
4	Guaymas	18	6	4	8	22	19	+3	25
5	CEPROFFA	18	5	3	10	27	28	−1	19
6	Huatabampo	18	3	3	12	16	35	−19	12
7	Cobras Fut Premier	18	1	3	14	12	49	−37	9

Updated to match(es) played on April 7, 2020. Source: LigaTDP

== Group 14 ==
Group with 7 teams from Baja California.

=== Teams ===
Location of teams in the 2019–20 Liga TDP Group 14

Team	City	Home ground	Capacity	Affiliate
40 Grados MXL	Mexicali, Baja California	Parque Deportivo Necaxa	1,000	–
Atlético Juniors	Tijuana, Baja California	Unidad Deportiva CREA	10,000	–
Cachanillas	Mexicali, Baja California	Club Necaxa	1,000	–
Gladiadores Tijuana	Tijuana, Baja California	Unidad Deportiva CREA	10,000	–
London	Tijuana, Baja California	Unidad Deportiva CREA	10,000	–
Minarete	Tijuana, Baja California	Unidad Deportiva CREA	10,000	–
Rosarito	Rosarito Beach, Baja California	Andrés Luna	2,000	–

=== League table ===
Pos	Team	Pld	W	D	L	GF	GA	GD	Pts
1	Cachanillas	22	19	1	2	64	23	+41	58
2	London	22	15	3	4	57	36	+21	50
3	Gladiadores Tijuana	22	10	5	7	46	44	+2	38
4	40 Grados MXL	21	11	1	9	47	39	+8	35
5	Atlético Juniors	22	6	5	11	25	34	−9	25
6	Rosarito	21	6	2	13	39	47	−8	20
7	Minarete	22	3	6	13	35	58	−23	17
8	Internacional	14	1	1	12	12	44	−32	5

Updated to match(es) played on April 7, 2020. Source: LigaTDP

== Reserve Teams ==
Each season a table is created among those teams that don't have the right to promote, because they are considered as reserve teams for teams that play in Liga MX, Ascenso MX and Liga Premier. The ranking order is determined through the "quotient", which is obtained by dividing the points obtained between the disputed matches, being ordered from highest to lowest.

=== Table ===
P	Team	Pts	G	Pts/G	GD
1	Celaya	58	22	2.64	+40
2	Cafetaleros de Chiapas	39	15	2.60	+30
3	Atlas	59	24	2.46	+45
4	Cimarrones de Sonora	44	18	2.44	+23
5	Pumas UNAM	49	21	2.33	+26
6	Universidad del Fútbol	53	23	2.30	+55
7	Atlante	50	22	2.27	+29
8	Leones Negros UdeG	59	28	2.11	+38
9	Mineros de Zacatecas	36	18	2.00	+22
10	Puebla	45	23	1.96	+23
11	Tijuana	35	18	1.94	+10
12	Guadalajara	50	26	1.92	+21
13	Tecos	48	26	1.85	+21
14	Tigres UANL	34	19	1.79	+15
15	Correcaminos UAT	30	18	1.67	+7
16	Escuela de Fútbol Chivas	47	29	1.62	0
17	Dorados de Sinaloa	40	25	1.60	–1
18	CAFESSA Tonalá	40	26	1.54	+5
19	Alebrijes de Oaxaca	20	15	1.33	+3
20	Mur	28	22	1.27	–8
21	Zacatepec	30	24	1.25	–8
22	Ciervos	22	23	0.96	–26
23	Atlético Bahía	14	26	0.54	–56
24	Alacranes de Durango	9	18	0.50	–39
25	CEFOR Mérida	1	21	0.05	–64

Last updated: March 16, 2020
Source: Liga TDP
P = Position; G = Games played; Pts = Points; Pts/G = Ratio of points to games played; GD = Goal difference

== Regular season statistics ==
=== Top goalscorers ===
Players sorted first by goals scored, then by last name.

Rank	Player	Club	Goals
1	(Mexico) Diego Armando Núñez	Catedráticos Elite	31
2	(Mexico) Marco Ibarra	Gorilas de Juanacatlán	29
2	(Mexico) Hugo Gómez	Papanes de Papantla	29
4	(Mexico) Juan Carlos Barajas	CEFUT	28
5	(Mexico) Salvador Hernández	Acatlán	26
6	(Mexico) Pablo Romagnoli	Lobos Chapultepec	25
6	(Mexico) William Terrones	Halcones Negros	25
8	(Mexico) Miguel Ángel Mendoza	Faraones Texcoco	20
8	(Mexico) David Josué Pérez	Chilangos	20
8	(Mexico) Ricardo Alba	Aragón FC	20

Last updated on March 16, 2020.
Source: LigaTDP

== See also ==
- Liga TDP
