= 2025–26 Liga TDP season =

Liga TDP
- Season: 2025–26
- Dates: 4 September 2025 – 29 May 2026
- Champions: Delfines de Coatzacoalcos (1st title)
- Matches: 3,194
- Goals: 10,846 (3.4 per match)
- Top goalscorer: Daniel Ramos (77 goals)
- Stats are from the regular season only

The 2025–26 Liga TDP season is the fourth-tier football league of Mexico. The tournament began on 4 September 2025 and will finish on 29 May 2026.

== Competition format ==
The Tercera División (Third Division) is divided into 17 groups. Since the 2009–2010 season, the format of the tournament has been reorganized to a home and away format, which all teams will play in their respective group. The 17 groups consist of teams which are eligible to play in the liguilla de ascenso (promotion play–offs) for four promotion spots, teams who are affiliated with teams in the Liga MX, Liga de Expansión MX and Liga Premier and development teams, which are not eligible for promotion but will play that who the better team in a sixteen team reserves playoff tournament for the entire season.

The regulation awards three points for a win, one point for a tie and zero points for a loss, however, when a match ends tied, a penalty shoot-out is played to award a bonus point to the winning team of the penalty series.

The league format allows participating franchises to rent their place to another team, so some clubs compete with a different name than the one registered with the FMF.

For the 2025–26 season there will be four promotions to the Liga Premier. Two to Serie A and two to Serie B.

== Group 1 ==
Group with 12 teams from Campeche, Quintana Roo and Yucatán.

Location of teams in the 2025–26 Liga TDP Group 1 (Campeche)
Location of teams in the 2025–26 Liga TDP Group 1 (Quintana Roo)
Location of teams in the 2025–26 Liga TDP Group 1 (Yucatán)

=== Teams ===
Team	City	Home ground	Capacity	Affiliate	Official Name
Boston Cancún	Cancún, Quintana Roo	CEDAR Cancún	1,000	Cancún	—
Chetumal	Chetumal, Quintana Roo	José López Portillo	6,600	–	–
Corsarios de Campeche	Campeche, Campeche	Universitario de Campeche	4,000	—	—
Deportiva Venados	Tamanché, Yucatán	Alonso Diego Molina	2,500	Deportiva Venados	—
Deportivo CTM Búhos	Puerto Morelos, Quintana Roo	Unidad Deportiva Colonia Pescadores	1,200	–	–
Ejidatarios de Bonfil	Alfredo V. Bonfil, Quintana Roo	La Parcela	1,000	–	–
Guerreros Cozumel	San Miguel de Cozumel, Quintana Roo	Unidad Deportiva Bicentenario	1,000	–	Los Ángeles
Inter Playa del Carmen	Playa del Carmen, Quintana Roo	Unidad Deportiva Mario Villanueva Madrid	7,500	Inter Playa del Carmen	—
ISG Sport	Ciudad del Carmen, Campeche	Unidad Deportiva 20 de Noviembre	1,000	–	–
Itzaes	Progreso, Yucatán	20 de Noviembre	3,000	Venados	Progreso
Mons Calpe Azucareros	Javier Rojo Gómez, Quintana Roo	Unidad Deportiva Azucareros	500	Mons Calpe	–
Pioneros Junior	Cancún, Quintana Roo	Cancún 86	6,390	Pioneros de Cancún	—

=== League table ===
Pos	Team	Pld	W	D	L	GF	GA	GD	BP	Pts	Qualification
1	Pioneros Junior	22	16	3	3	37	14	+23	2	53	Liguilla de Filiales
2	Corsarios de Campeche	22	14	5	3	26	9	+17	3	50	Liguilla de Ascenso
3	Ejidatarios de Bonfil	22	14	2	6	32	20	+12	1	45	Liguilla de Ascenso
4	Itzaes	22	11	8	3	30	14	+16	3	44	Liguilla de Ascenso
5	Inter Playa del Carmen	22	10	7	5	37	19	+18	3	40	Liguilla de Filiales
6	Deportiva Venados	22	11	3	8	34	16	+18	3	39	Liguilla de Filiales
7	Boston Cancún	22	8	8	6	37	26	+11	6	38	Liguilla de Filiales
8	Deportivo CTM Búhos	22	5	7	10	21	31	−10	3	25	
9	Chetumal	22	4	6	12	14	27	−13	2	20	
10	Guerreros Cozumel	22	5	2	15	27	48	−21	1	18	
11	Mons Calpe Azucareros	22	3	5	14	11	41	−30	2	16	
12	ISG Sport	22	1	4	17	5	46	−41	1	8	

Updated to match(es) played on 18 April 2026. Source: Liga TDP

== Group 2 ==
Group with 16 teams from Chiapas, Oaxaca and Tabasco.

=== Teams ===
Location of teams in the 2025–26 Liga TDP Group 2 (Chiapas and Tabasco)
Location of teams in the 2025–26 Liga TDP Group 2 (Oaxaca)

Team	City	Home ground	Capacity	Affiliate	Official name
Academia Dragones	Zimatlán de Álvarez, Oaxaca	Polideportivo Ignacio Mejía	1,000	Alebrijes de Oaxaca	–
Alebrijes de Oaxaca	Oaxaca City, Oaxaca	Microestadio ITO	1,000	Alebrijes de Oaxaca	–
Antequera	Oaxaca City, Oaxaca	Deportivo Ramos	1,000	–	–
CEFOR Chiapas	Tuxtla Gutiérrez, Chiapas	Flor de Sospo	3,000	–	–
Chapulineros de Oaxaca	San Jerónimo Tlacochahuaya, Oaxaca	Independiente MRCI	6,000	Chapulineros de Oaxaca	–
Cruz Azul Lagunas	Lagunas, Oaxaca	Cruz Azul	2,000	Cruz Azul	–
Dragones de Oaxaca	Oaxaca City, Oaxaca	Parque Primavera	1,000	Dragones de Oaxaca	–
Felinos 48	Reforma, Chiapas	Cancha Unidad y Compromiso	600	–	–
Huracanes de Arriaga	Arriaga, Chiapas	Unidad Deportiva Arriaga	1,000	–	PRO CAMP
Lechuzas UPGCH	Tuxtla Gutiérrez, Chiapas	Flor de Sospo	3,000	–	–
Napoli Tabasco	Villahermosa, Tabasco	Olímpico de Villahermosa	12,000	Artesanos Metepec	Artesanos Bajos de Chila
Pavones ADMC	Tuxtla Gutiérrez, Chiapas	ITESM Campus Chiapas	1,000	–	–
Pijijiapan	Pijijiapan, Chiapas	Unidad Deportiva Pijijiapan	1,000	–	Iguanas
Tapachula Soconusco	Tapachula, Chiapas	Olímpico de Tapachula	18,017	Tapachula Soconusco	–
Universidad del Sureste	Comitán de Domínguez, Chiapas	Centro de Formación UDS	500	—	—
Universidad Euroamericana	Oaxaca City, Oaxaca	Parque Primavera	1,000	–	–

=== League table ===
Pos	Team	Pld	W	D	L	GF	GA	GD	BP	Pts	Qualification
1	Lechuzas UPGCH	30	25	3	2	80	10	+70	2	80	Liguilla de Ascenso
2	Cruz Azul Lagunas	30	22	5	3	84	21	+63	3	74	Liguilla de Ascenso
3	Chapulineros de Oaxaca	30	13	10	7	53	34	+19	8	57	Liguilla de Filiales
4	CEFOR Chiapas	30	14	9	7	51	45	+6	5	56	Liguilla de Ascenso
5	Alebrijes de Oaxaca	30	15	6	9	57	32	+25	2	53	Liguilla de Filiales
6	Dragones de Oaxaca	30	13	8	9	48	33	+15	6	53	Liguilla de Filiales
7	Tapachula Soconusco	30	12	8	10	62	49	+13	3	47	Liguilla de Filiales
8	Universidad del Sureste	30	12	6	12	30	50	−20	3	45	
9	Felinos 48	30	11	7	12	46	57	−11	4	44	
10	Huracanes de Arriaga	30	11	4	15	44	49	−5	4	41	
11	Pijijiapan	30	9	8	13	41	44	−3	4	39	
12	Napoli Tabasco	30	9	10	11	32	40	−8	2	39	
13	Pavones ADMC	30	9	7	14	29	43	−14	3	37	
14	Antequera	30	5	4	21	30	67	−37	0	19	
15	Academia Dragones	30	5	3	22	25	76	−51	0	18	
16	Universidad Euroamericana	30	3	6	21	17	79	−62	3	18	

Updated to match(es) played on 18 April 2026. Source: Liga TDP

== Group 3 ==
Group with 15 teams from Oaxaca and Veracruz.

=== Teams ===
Location of teams in the 2025–26 Liga TDP Group 3

Team	City	Home ground	Capacity	Affiliate	Official Name
Académicos UGM	Orizaba, Veracruz	Universitario UGM	1,500	—	—
Águila Azteca	Chocamán, Veracruz	El Mariscal	2,000	–	–
Atlético Boca del Río	Veracruz City, Veracruz	Instituto Tecnológico de Veracruz	1,000	–	–
Atlético Tibu	Alvarado, Veracruz	Unidad Deportiva Miguel Alemán	1,000	–	–
Azucareros de Tezonapa	Tezonapa, Veracruz	Unidad Deportiva Ernesto Jácome Pérez	1,000	–	Guerreros de Puebla
Caballeros de Córdoba	Córdoba, Veracruz	Rafael Murillo Vidal	3,800	—	—
Conejos de Tuxtepec	Tuxtepec, Oaxaca	Gustavo Pacheco Villaseñor	15,000	—	—
Córdoba	Córdoba, Veracruz	Rafael Murillo Vidal	3,800	—	–
Delfines de Coatzacoalcos	Coatzacoalcos, Veracruz	Rafael Hernández Ochoa	4,800	–	–
Delfines UGM	Nogales, Veracruz	UGM Nogales	1,500	—	—
Manta Rayas	Tierra Blanca, Veracruz	La Masía	1,000	–	–
Montañeses Potros Casino Español	Córdoba, Veracruz	Unidad Deportiva Casino Español	800	Montañeses	Montañeses
Performance	Medellín de Bravo, Veracruz	Campo San Sebastián	500	–	–
Racing de Veracruz	Boca del Río, Veracruz	Unidad Deportiva Hugo Sánchez	4,000	Racing de Veracruz	–
Sozca	Lerdo de Tejada, Veracruz	José Seoane Lavín	1,000	–	–

=== League table ===
Pos	Team	Pld	W	D	L	GF	GA	GD	BP	Pts	Qualification
1	Delfines de Coatzacoalcos	28	23	3	2	103	15	+88	3	75	Liguilla de Ascenso
2	Racing de Veracruz	27	23	2	2	81	12	+69	1	72	Liguilla de Filiales
3	Académicos UGM	28	14	10	4	55	23	+32	8	60	Liguilla de Ascenso
4	Delfines UGM	28	13	12	3	52	28	+24	7	58	Liguilla de Ascenso
5	Caballeros de Córdoba	28	16	6	6	68	27	+41	1	55	Liguilla de Ascenso
6	Córdoba	28	13	7	8	59	40	+19	3	49	
7	Águila Azteca	27	11	9	7	51	33	+18	6	48	
8	Atlético Tibu	28	10	5	13	53	49	+4	4	39	
9	Performance	28	13	0	15	49	57	−8	0	39	
10	Montañeses Potros Casino Español	28	10	6	12	37	57	−20	1	37	
11	Azucareros de Tezonapa	28	9	6	13	39	57	−18	1	34	
12	Atlético Boca del Río	28	7	4	17	32	65	−33	3	28	
13	Manta Rayas	28	3	2	23	23	94	−71	2	13	
14	Conejos de Tuxtepec	28	2	5	21	29	101	−72	0	11	
15	Sozca	28	2	3	23	32	105	−73	0	9	

Updated to match(es) played on 18 April 2026. Source: Liga TDP

== Group 4 ==
Group with 11 teams from Puebla, Tamaulipas, Tlaxcala and Veracruz.

=== Teams ===
Location of teams in the 2025–26 Liga TDP Group 4 (Puebla and Tlaxcala)
Location of teams in the 2025–26 Liga TDP Group 4 Tampico and Veracruz

Team	City	Home ground	Capacity	Affiliate	Official Name
Cafeteros de Atlixco	Atlixco, Puebla	ATB	1,000	–	–
Delta	Tehuacán, Puebla	Polideportivo La Huizachera	1,000	—	—
Deportivo JEM	Mazatecochco, Tlaxcala	San José del Agua	1,000	–	–
Licántropos	Cuautinchán, Puebla	Campos El Cóndor	500	—	—
Ocelot Academy MX	San Pedro Cholula, Puebla	Cholula Soccer	500	–	Tlapa
Orgullo Surtam	Altamira, Tamaulipas	Altamira	9,581	–	–
Papantla	Papantla, Veracruz	Fénix Solidaridad	3,000	–	Papanes de Papantla
PDLA	San Pedro Cholula, Puebla	Unidad Deportiva San Pedro Cholula	1,000	–	–
Real Tlaxcala	Nanacamilpa, Tlaxcala	Unidad Deportiva José Brindis	5,000	–	Atlético Tulancingo
Reales de Puebla	Amozoc, Puebla	Unidad Deportiva Chachapa	1,000	—	—
Tehuacán	Tehuacán, Puebla	Polideportivo La Huizachera	1,000	—	—

=== League table ===
Pos	Team	Pld	W	D	L	GF	GA	GD	BP	Pts	Qualification
1	Orgullo Surtam	20	12	5	3	46	22	+24	5	46	Liguilla de Ascenso
2	Ocelot Academy MX	20	13	3	4	45	36	+9	3	45	Liguilla de Ascenso
3	PDLA	20	13	3	4	61	24	+37	2	44	Liguilla de Ascenso
4	Delta	20	13	3	4	34	17	+17	1	43	
5	Licántropos	20	9	4	7	27	28	−1	2	33	
6	Real Tlaxcala	20	9	4	7	42	37	+5	0	31	
7	Tehuacán	20	7	3	10	32	37	−5	1	25	
8	Reales de Puebla	20	6	5	9	29	42	−13	2	25	
9	Papantla	20	4	2	14	27	44	−17	1	15	
10	Cafeteros de Atlixco	20	4	2	14	38	58	−20	0	14	
11	Deportivo JEM	20	3	0	17	15	51	−36	0	9	

Updated to match(es) played on 18 April 2026. Source: Liga TDP

== Group 5 ==
Group with 16 teams from Greater Mexico City.

=== Teams ===
Location of teams in the 2025–26 Liga TDP Group 5
Location of teams in the 2025–26 Liga TDP Group 5 (Rural Greater Mexico City)

Team	City	Home ground	Capacity	Affiliate	Official name
Álamos	Venustiano Carranza, Mexico City	Deportivo Plutarco Elías Calles	1,000	Guadalajara	–
Aragón	Gustavo A. Madero, Mexico City	Deportivo Francisco Zarco	1,000	–	–
Aztecas AMF Soccer	Gustavo A. Madero, Mexico City	Deportivo Francisco Zarco	1,000	–	–
Cañoneros	Gustavo A. Madero, Mexico City	Deportivo Francisco Zarco	1,000	–	–
Cefor Cuauhtémoc Blanco	Gustavo A. Madero, Mexico City	Deportivo Los Galeana	1,000	–	–
Cefor Mexiquense	Ecatepec de Morelos, State of Mexico	Revolución 30-30	1,000	–	Atlético Mexicano
CH Fútbol Club	Iztacalco, Mexico City	Jesús Martínez "Palillo"	6,000	–	–
Ecatepec	Ecatepec de Morelos, State of Mexico	Guadalupe Victoria	1,000	–	–
Formación Metropolitana	Gustavo A. Madero, Mexico City	Deportivo Francisco Zarco	1,000	–	–
FORMAFUTINTEGRAL	Venustiano Carranza, Mexico City	Deportivo Lázaro Cárdenas	2,000	–	–
Independiente Mexiquense	Huehuetoca, State of Mexico	12 de Mayo	1,500	–	–
Oceanía	Venustiano Carranza, Mexico City	Deportivo Oceanía	1,000	–	–
Promodep Central	Venustiano Carranza, Mexico City	Deportivo Plutarco Elías Calles	1,000	–	–
Sangre de Campeón	Tultitlán, State of Mexico	Cancha Nou Camp	1,000	–	–
Unión	Ecatepec, State of Mexico	Titanium Soccer	500	–	–

=== League table ===
Pos	Team	Pld	W	D	L	GF	GA	GD	BP	Pts	Qualification
1	Aztecas AMF Soccer	28	21	6	1	99	18	+81	4	73	Liguilla de Ascenso
2	Álamos	28	21	5	2	76	19	+57	2	70	Liguilla de Ascenso
3	Ecatepec	28	20	2	6	119	42	+77	1	63	Liguilla de Ascenso
4	Sangre de Campeón	28	17	5	6	68	33	+35	3	59	Liguilla de Ascenso
5	FORMAFUTINTEGRAL	28	16	6	6	74	30	+44	4	58	
6	Independiente Mexiquense	28	15	7	6	55	28	+27	3	55	
7	Cefor Cuauhtémoc Blanco	28	15	3	10	54	30	+24	3	51	
8	Formación Metropolitana	28	13	3	12	55	53	+2	0	42	
9	Oceanía	28	11	4	13	61	56	+5	1	38	
10	CH Fútbol Club	28	11	2	15	59	102	−43	0	35	
11	Unión	28	8	6	14	42	53	−11	3	33	
12	Cefor Mexiquense	28	9	2	17	47	70	−23	2	31	
13	Promodep Central	28	3	1	24	31	107	−76	0	10	
14	Cañoneros	28	2	0	26	21	118	−97	0	6	
15	Aragón	28	1	2	25	16	118	−102	1	6	

Updated to match(es) played on 18 April 2026. Source: Liga TDP

== Group 6 ==
Group with 16 teams from Greater Mexico City and Hidalgo.

=== Teams ===
Location of teams in the 2025–26 Liga TDP Group 6
Location of teams in the 2025–26 Liga TDP Group 6 (Hidalgo)

Team	City	Home ground	Capacity	Affiliate	Official name
Arietes	Gustavo A. Madero, Mexico City	Deportivo Francisco Zarco	1,000	–	–
Atlético Inter Capital	Xochimilco, Mexico City	Valentín González	2,500	–	–
CAR América Leyendas	Magdalena Contreras, Mexico City	Deportivo Casa Popular	1,000	–	San José del Arenal
CARSAF	Venustiano Carranza, Mexico City	Deportivo Lázaro Cárdenas	2,000	–	–
CILESI	Xochimilco, Mexico City	Valentín González	2,500	–	–
Coyotes Neza	Venustiano Carranza, Mexico City	Deportivo Oceanía	1,000	–	Halcones Zúñiga
Cuemanco	Xochimilco, Mexico City	Valentín González	2,500	–	Atlético Pachuca
Domínguez Osos	Venustiano Carranza, Mexico City	Deportivo Oceanía	1,000	–	–
Halcones de Rayón	Gustavo A. Madero, Mexico City	Deportivo Francisco Zarco	1,000	–	–
Héroes de Zaci CDMX	Venustiano Carranza, Mexico City	Deportivo Lázaro Cárdenas	2,000	Héroes de Zaci	–
Irapuato Olimpo	Xochimilco, Mexico City	San Isidro	1,200	Irapuato	–
Novillos Neza	Iztacalco, Mexico City	Jesús Martínez "Palillo"	6,000	–	–
Politécnico	Venustiano Carranza, Mexico City	Deportivo Leandro Valle	1,000	–	–
Santiago Tulantepec	Pachuca, Hidalgo	Club Hidalguense	1,000	–	–
Toros México	Tultepec, State of Mexico	Deportivo Centenario	1,000	–	Ciervos
Valle de Xico	Venustiano Carranza, Mexico City	Deportivo Lázaro Cárdenas	1,000	–	–

=== League table ===
Pos	Team	Pld	W	D	L	GF	GA	GD	BP	Pts	Qualification
1	CARSAF	30	21	6	3	86	23	+63	5	74	Liguilla de Ascenso
2	Politécnico	30	19	6	5	55	16	+39	3	66	Liguilla de Ascenso
3	Atlético InterCapital	30	18	5	7	58	23	+35	5	64	Liguilla de Ascenso
4	Valle de Xico	30	17	8	5	59	24	+35	4	63	Liguilla de Ascenso
5	Héroes de Zaci CDMX	30	18	5	7	67	31	+36	2	61	Liguilla de Filiales
6	Irapuato Olimpo	30	12	12	6	54	42	+12	7	55	Liguilla de Filiales
7	CAR América Leyendas	30	13	7	10	57	36	+21	3	49	
8	Domínguez Osos	30	12	10	8	52	43	+9	3	49	
9	Toros México	30	13	6	11	64	47	+17	1	46	
10	Santiago Tulantepec	30	11	7	12	37	58	−21	5	45	
11	Novillos Neza	30	11	5	14	46	47	−1	2	40	
12	Arietes	30	10	3	17	33	48	−15	2	35	
13	Halcones de Rayón	30	7	6	17	31	64	−33	3	30	
14	Coyotes Neza	30	3	6	21	19	65	−46	2	17	
15	Cuemanco	30	3	4	23	21	80	−59	2	15	
16	CILESI	30	2	4	24	22	114	−92	1	11	

Updated to match(es) played on 18 April 2026. Source: Liga TDP

== Group 7 ==
Group with 14 teams from Hidalgo and State of Mexico.

Location of teams in the 2025–26 Liga TDP Group 7

=== Teams ===
Team	City	Home ground	Capacity	Affiliate	Official name
Ajolotes Lerma	Lerma, State of Mexico	Unidad Deportiva Lerma	1,000	–	–
Around Soccer	Tepeji, Hidalgo	Tepeji	2,000	–	–
Artesanos Metepec	Metepec, State of Mexico	La Hortaliza	2,000	Artesanos Metepec	–
Astilleros	Huixquilucan, State of Mexico	Santos Degollado	1,000	–	–
CID Leones Negros Toluca	Ixtlahuaca, State of Mexico	Deportivo El Picoso	1,000	–	Grupo Sherwood
Cordobés	Huixquilucan, State of Mexico	Alberto Pérez Navarro	3,000	Cordobés	–
Dragones Toluca	Toluca, State of Mexico	Unidad Deportiva San Antonio Buenavista	1,000	Dragones Toluca	–
Estudiantes	San Felipe del Progreso, State of Mexico	Margarito Esquivel	1,000	–	–
Fuerza Mazahua	Calimaya, State of Mexico	Deportivo Calimaya	1,000	–	–
Hermanos Benítez	Huixquilucan, State of Mexico	Alberto Pérez Navarro	3,000	–	–
Leones Huixquilucan	Huixquilucan, State of Mexico	Alberto Pérez Navarro	3,000	–	–
Luma Sports	Villa Cuauhtémoc, State of Mexico	Centro Deportivo y Cultural Las Peñas	1,000	–	–
Deportivo Metepec	Metepec, State of Mexico	Jesús Lara	1,000	–	–
Orishas Tepeji	Tepeji, Hidalgo	Tepeji	2,000	–	–

=== League table ===
Pos	Team	Pld	W	D	L	GF	GA	GD	BP	Pts	Qualification
1	Orishas Tepeji	26	20	3	3	74	23	+51	2	65	Liguilla de Ascenso
2	Estudiantes	26	16	5	5	68	35	+33	5	58	Liguilla de Ascenso
3	Cordobés	26	12	8	6	47	29	+18	3	47	Liguilla de Filiales
4	Artesanos Metepec	26	13	5	8	37	26	+11	3	47	Liguilla de Filiales
5	Dragones Toluca	26	14	3	9	59	43	+16	1	46	Liguilla de Filiales
6	Deportivo Metepec	26	13	4	9	48	32	+16	3	46	Liguilla de Ascenso
7	CID Leones Negros Toluca	26	10	8	8	35	33	+2	4	42	
8	Leones Huixquilucan	26	11	3	12	35	36	−1	2	38	
9	Ajolotes Lerma	26	10	5	11	38	46	−8	2	37	
10	Fuerza Mazahua	26	11	1	14	35	55	−20	1	35	
11	Luma Sports	26	6	6	14	23	44	−21	2	26	
12	Astilleros	26	6	6	14	25	49	−24	0	24	
13	Around Soccer	26	6	2	18	38	74	−36	1	21	
14	Hermanos Benítez	26	4	1	21	21	58	−37	1	14	

Updated to match(es) played on 18 April 2026. Source: Liga TDP

== Group 8 ==
Group with 16 teams from Guerrero, Mexico City, Morelos and State of Mexico.

=== Teams ===
Location of teams in the 2025–26 Liga TDP Group 8 (Mexico City metro area)
Location of teams in the 2025–26 Liga TDP Group 8 (Morelos)
Location of teams in the 2025–26 Liga TDP Group 7 (Guerrero)

Team	City	Home ground	Capacity	Affiliate	Official name
Águilas UAGro	Chilpancingo, Guerrero	UAGro	2,000	–	–
Alebrijes CDMX	Tlalpan, Mexico City	Colegio México	500	Alebrijes de Oaxaca	–
Atlético Cuernavaca	Cuernavaca, Morelos	La Escuelita Xochitepec	1,000	–	–
Balam–Jaguares	Venustiano Carranza, Mexico City	Deportivo Lázaro Cárdenas	2,000	Jaguares	–
Cantera Coka	Coyoacán, Mexico City	Cancha 5 Sindicato Mexicano de Electricistas	500	–	–
Caudillos de Morelos	Chiconcuac, Morelos	Unidad Deportiva Chiconcuac	1,000	–	–
Iguala	Iguala, Guerrero	Unidad Deportiva Iguala	4,000	–	–
Marina	Venustiano Carranza, Mexico City	Deportivo Oceanía	1,000	–	–
TDP Mazatepec	Mazatepec, Morelos	Unidad Deportiva Mazatepec	1,000	–	Lobos ITECA
Mineros CDMX	Milpa Alta, Mexico City	Momoxco	3,500	Mineros de Zacatecas	–
Panteras Neza	Nezahualcóyotl, State of Mexico	Metropolitano de Neza	1,800	–	Colegio Once México
Real Morelos 27	Jiutepec, Morelos	Moisés Galindo	1,000	–	–
Selva Cañera	Zacatepec, Morelos	Agustín Coruco Díaz	24,313	Zacatepec	–
Sporting Canamy	Coyoacán, Mexico City	Deportivo Huayamilpas	1,000	Sporting Canamy	–
Yautepec	Yautepec, Morelos	Campo Deportivo Yautepec	3,000	–	–
Zapata	Xochitepec, Morelos	Real del Puente	1,000	–	–

=== League table ===
Pos	Team	Pld	W	D	L	GF	GA	GD	BP	Pts	Qualification
1	Yautepec	30	26	4	0	112	21	+91	3	85	Liguilla de Ascenso
2	Águilas UAGro	30	24	5	1	92	20	+72	5	82	Liguilla de Ascenso
3	Cantera Coka	30	20	3	7	79	36	+43	1	64	Liguilla de Ascenso
4	Atlético Cuernavaca	30	18	7	5	70	34	+36	0	61	Liguilla de Ascenso
5	Real Morelos 27	30	16	6	8	54	33	+21	4	58	
6	Selva Cañera	30	14	5	11	52	61	−9	4	51	
7	Alebrijes CDMX	30	14	6	10	73	56	+17	2	50	Liguilla de Filiales
8	Zapata	30	13	3	14	56	48	+8	2	44	
9	Caudillos de Morelos	30	13	4	13	45	53	−8	0	43	
10	Balam–Jaguares	30	10	6	14	36	42	−6	4	40	
11	Iguala	30	8	6	16	53	77	−24	3	33	
12	TDP Mazatepec	30	7	6	17	29	56	−27	5	32	
13	Mineros CDMX	30	9	1	20	34	85	−51	0	28	
14	Panteras Neza	30	7	5	18	47	58	−11	1	27	
15	Sporting Canamy	30	3	2	25	25	89	−64	2	13	
16	Marina	30	2	3	25	34	122	−88	0	9	

Updated to match(es) played on 19 April 2026. Source: Liga TDP

== Group 9 ==
Group with 16 teams from Hidalgo, Mexico City, State of Mexico and Querétaro. For the second half of the season, Atlético Huejutla underwent a change of operator and city, becoming managed by Inter de Querétaro F.C., instead of Real Tlanchinol, the team that had operated it during the first half of the tournament.

=== Teams ===
Location of teams in the 2025–26 Liga TDP Group 9 (Hidalgo)
Location of teams in the 2025–26 Liga TDP Group 9 (Mexico City, State of Mexico and Querétaro)

Team	City	Home ground	Capacity	Affiliate	Official name
Águilas de Teotitihuacán	San Martín de las Pirámides, State of Mexico	Deportivo Braulio Romero	1,000	–	–
Alebrijes Teotihuacán	San Juan Teotihuacán, State of Mexico	Centro Deportivo Pascual	1,000	Alebrijes de Oaxaca	–
Atlético Toltecas	Tula, Hidalgo	Parque 7 de Agosto	1,000	–	–
Bombarderos de Tecámac	Tecámac, State of Mexico	Deportivo Sierra Hermosa	1,000	–	–
CEFOR 3030	Ecatepec, State of Mexico	Titanium Soccer	500	–	–
Halcones Negros	Chicoloapan de Juárez, State of Mexico	Unidad Deportiva San José	1,000	–	–
Héroes de Zaci Hidalgo	Mineral de la Reforma, Hidalgo	Horacio Baños González	1,000	Héroes de Zaci	–
Hidalguense	Pachuca, Hidalgo	Club Hidalguense	600	–	–
Inter de Querétaro	Santa Rosa, Querétaro	Parque Bicentenario	2,000	–	Atlético Huejutla
Lilo	San Juan Zitlaltepec, State of Mexico	San Juan Zitlaltepec	1,500	–	Matamoros
Lonsdaleíta	Pachuca, Hidalgo	Revolución Mexicana	3,500	–	–
Muxes	Venustiano Carranza, Mexico City	Deportivo Oceanía	1,000	–	–
Pachuca	San Agustín Tlaxiaca, Hidalgo	Universidad del Fútbol	1,000	Pachuca	–
Sk Sport Street Soccer	Tulancingo, Hidalgo	Primero de Mayo	2,500	–	–
Soles de Teotihuacán	San Juan Teotihuacán, State of Mexico	Centro Deportivo Pascual	1,000	–	Milenarios de Oaxaca
Tuzos Pachuca	San Agustín Tlaxiaca, Hidalgo	Universidad del Fútbol	1,000	Pachuca	–

=== League table ===
Pos	Team	Pld	W	D	L	GF	GA	GD	BP	Pts	Qualification
1	Bombarderos de Tecámac	30	23	5	2	116	23	+93	4	78	Liguilla de Ascenso
2	Pachuca	30	22	6	2	103	19	+84	3	75	Liguilla de Filiales
3	Sk Sport Street Soccer	30	22	5	3	136	22	+114	3	74	Liguilla de Ascenso
4	Halcones Negros	30	23	2	5	139	27	+112	0	71	Liguilla de Ascenso
5	Muxes	30	20	7	3	101	25	+76	3	70	Liguilla de Ascenso
6	Atlético Toltecas	30	18	3	9	86	44	+42	2	59	
7	Lilo	30	14	7	9	72	48	+24	4	53	
8	UFD Tuzos Pachuca	30	14	4	12	64	67	−3	2	48	
9	Hidalguense	30	13	3	14	43	47	−4	2	44	
10	Alebrijes Teotihuacán	30	8	4	18	47	85	−38	1	29	
11	Águilas de Teotihuacán	30	8	2	20	36	96	−60	1	27	
12	CEFOR 3030	30	6	5	19	34	87	−53	2	25	
13	Lonsdaleíta	30	6	3	21	28	78	−50	2	23	
14	Inter de Querétaro	30	5	4	21	33	111	−78	2	21	
15	Soles de Teotihuacán	30	3	6	21	34	109	−75	2	17	
16	Héroes de Zaci Hidalgo	30	2	0	28	11	195	−184	0	6	

Updated to match(es) played on 18 April 2026. Source: Liga TDP

== Group 10 ==
Group with 12 teams from Guanajuato and Querétaro.

Location of teams in the 2025–26 Liga TDP Group 10 (Guanajuato)
Location of teams in the 2025–26 Liga TDP Group 10 (Querétaro)

=== Teams ===
Team	City	Home ground	Capacity	Affiliate	Official name
Atlético Campesinos	Tequisquiapan, Querétaro	Unidad Deportiva Emiliano Zapata	1,000	–	Bucaneros de Matamoros
Cajeteros Celaya	Celaya, Guanajuato	Unidad Deportiva Miguel Alemán	1,000	–	–
Ceforma	San Juan del Río, Querétaro	Kancha Gustavo Emilio	500	–	Atlético Ixtepec
Celaya Linces	Comonfort, Guanajuato	Brígido Vargas	4,000	–	–
Estudiantes de Querétaro	Querétaro, Querétaro	Escuela Normal de Querétaro	1,000	–	–
Fundadores El Marqués	Santa Rosa, Querétaro	Parque Bicentenario	2,000	–	–
Instituto de Fútbol de Alta Competencia	Santa Rosa, Querétaro	Parque Bicentenario	2,000	–	–
La Piedad Querétaro	Querétaro, Querétaro	El Infiernillo	1,000	–	–
Leyendas	Guanajuato City, Guanajuato	Unidad Deportiva Juan José Torres Landa	1,000	–	–
Lobos ULMX	Celaya, Guanajuato	ULMX	1,200	Lobos ULMX	–
San Juan del Río	San Juan del Río, Querétaro	Unidad Deportiva Norte	1,000	–	–
Titanes de Querétaro	San José Iturbide, Guanajuato	Unidad Deportiva San José Iturbide	1,000	–	–

=== League table ===
Pos	Team	Pld	W	D	L	GF	GA	GD	BP	Pts	Qualification
1	Estudiantes de Querétaro	22	16	3	3	42	19	+23	2	53	Liguilla de Ascenso
2	La Piedad Querétaro	22	15	3	4	45	26	+19	0	48	Liguilla de Ascenso
3	Titanes de Querétaro	22	14	4	4	40	24	+16	2	48	Liguilla de Ascenso
4	Leyendas	22	13	1	8	36	34	+2	0	40	Liguilla de Ascenso
5	Lobos ULMX	22	10	5	7	33	18	+15	4	39	Liguilla de Filiales
6	Celaya Linces	22	8	7	7	29	24	+5	4	35	
7	San Juan del Río	22	9	5	8	25	23	+2	2	34	
8	Instituto de Fútbol de Alta Competencia	22	6	7	9	24	37	−13	3	28	
9	Cajeteros Celaya	22	6	3	13	25	32	−7	2	23	
10	Fundadores El Marqués	22	5	2	15	15	21	−6	1	18	
11	Ceforma	22	4	4	14	21	56	−35	2	18	
12	Atlético Campesinos	22	3	2	17	13	34	−21	1	12	

Updated to match(es) played on 18 April 2026. Source: Liga TDP

== Group 11 ==
Group with 11 teams from Guanajuato and Michoacán.

=== Teams ===
Location of teams in the 2025–26 Liga TDP Group 11

Team	City	Home ground	Capacity	Affiliate	Official name
Atlético Morelia – Universidad Michoacana	Morelia, Michoacán	Universitario UMSNH	5,000	Atlético Morelia	–
Bucaneros	Irimbo, Michoacán	Deportivo 18 de Marzo	1,000	–	–
Delfines de Abasolo	Abasolo, Guanajuato	Municipal de Abasolo	2,500	–	–
Deportivo Lázaro Cárdenas	Lázaro Cárdenas, Michoacán	Unidad Deportiva Lázaro Cárdenas	1,000	Zitácuaro	Zitácuaro
Deportivo Sahuayo	Sahuayo, Michoacán	Unidad Deportiva Francisco García Vilchis	1,500	–	–
Deportivo Zamora	Zamora, Michoacán	Unidad Deportiva El Chamizal	5,000	–	–
Furia Azul	Pátzcuaro, Michoacán	Furia Azul	3,000	–	–
Guerreros Zacapu	Zacapu, Michoacán	Municipal de Zacapu	2,500	–	Atlético Valladolid
H2O Purépechas	Morelia, Michoacán	Cancha 15 Policía y Tránsito	1,000	Atlético Morelia	–
Halcones AFU	Uruapan, Michoacán	Unidad Deportiva Hermanos López Rayón	5,000	Halcones	Halcones
La Piedad Imperial	La Piedad, Michoacán	Club Azteca	1,000	–	–

=== League table ===
Pos	Team	Pld	W	D	L	GF	GA	GD	BP	Pts	Qualification
1	Atlético Morelia – Universidad Michoacana	20	17	1	2	66	24	+42	0	52	Liguilla de Filiales
2	La Piedad Imperial	20	10	5	5	38	24	+14	3	38	Liguilla de Ascenso
3	Deportivo Lázaro Cárdenas	20	10	4	6	32	26	+6	4	38	Liguilla de Filiales
4	H2O Purépechas	20	10	3	7	26	18	+8	3	36	Liguilla de Ascenso
5	Deportivo Sahuayo	20	10	2	8	24	19	+5	2	34	Liguilla de Ascenso
6	Deportivo Zamora	20	8	5	7	32	30	+2	0	29	
7	Halcones AFU	20	8	3	9	21	28	−7	2	29	
8	Delfines de Abasolo	20	8	3	9	26	31	−5	1	28	
9	Bucaneros	20	6	2	12	23	37	−14	0	20	
10	Guerreros Zacapu	20	5	3	12	26	44	−18	1	19	
11	Furia Azul	20	1	3	16	21	54	−33	1	7	

Updated to match(es) played on 18 April 2026. Source: Liga TDP

== Group 12 ==
Group with 15 teams from Aguascalientes, Guanajuato, Jalisco, San Luis Potosí and Zacatecas.

=== Teams ===
Location of teams in the 2025–26 Liga TDP Group 12 (Guanajuato and Jalisco)
Location of teams in the 2025–26 Liga TDP Group 12 (Aguascalientes and Zacatecas)

Team	City	Home ground	Capacity	Affiliate	Official name
Atlético ECCA	León, Guanajuato	Parque Metropolitano	500	–	–
Atlético Leonés	León, Guanajuato	CODE Las Joyas	1,000	–	–
Cachorros de León	León, Guanajuato	CODE Las Joyas	1,000	–	Fut-Car
Cefor Promotora San Luis	Soledad de Graciano Sánchez, San Luis Potosí	Unidad Deportiva 21 de Marzo	7,000	–	–
Empresarios del Rincón	Purísima del Rincón, Guanajuato	Unidad Deportiva de Purísima	1,000	–	Real Olmeca Sport
Irapuato	Irapuato, Guanajuato	Sergio León Chávez	25,000	Irapuato	–
León GEN	Lagos de Moreno, Jalisco	La Esmeralda Club León	2,000	León	–
Leyendas Unidas	León, Guanajuato	Parque Metropolitano	500	–	Jaral del Progreso
Magos del Rincón	Purísima del Rincón, Guanajuato	Unidad Deportiva de Purísima	1,000	–	–
Mineros de Zacatecas	Zacatecas, Zacatecas	Unidad Deportiva Guadalupe	1,000	Mineros de Zacatecas	–
Necaxa	Aguascalientes, Aguascalientes	Casa Club Necaxa	1,000	Necaxa	–
Pabellón	Aguascalientes, Aguascalientes	Ferrocarrilero	2,000	–	–
Potosinos	San Luis Potosí, San Luis Potosí	Unidad Deportiva Adolfo López Mateos	1,000	–	–
Santa Ana del Conde	Santa Ana del Conde, Guanajuato	El Roble	500	–	–
Tuzos UAZ	Zacatecas, Zacatecas	Universitario Unidad Deportiva Norte	5,000	Tuzos UAZ	–

=== League table ===
Pos	Team	Pld	W	D	L	GF	GA	GD	BP	Pts	Qualification
1	Irapuato	28	19	5	4	79	28	+51	5	67	Liguilla de Filiales
2	Cachorros de León	28	20	4	4	65	20	+45	2	66	Liguilla de Ascenso
3	Magos del Rincón	28	20	2	6	60	21	+39	2	64	Liguilla de Ascenso
4	Mineros de Zacatecas	28	15	5	8	48	38	+10	3	53	Liguilla de Filiales
5	Atlético Leonés	28	12	9	7	42	24	+18	5	50	Liguilla de Ascenso
6	Cefor Promotora San Luis	28	14	6	8	54	41	+13	2	50	Liguilla de Ascenso
7	León GEN	28	14	4	10	44	51	−7	3	49	Liguilla de Filiales
8	Necaxa	28	14	2	12	43	40	+3	0	44	
9	Pabellón	28	12	6	10	42	39	+3	1	43	
10	Leyendas Unidas	28	10	5	13	36	46	−10	2	37	
11	Santa Ana del Conde	28	8	6	14	26	47	−21	5	35	
12	Tuzos UAZ	28	10	4	14	39	47	−8	0	34	
13	Potosinos	28	9	4	15	25	40	−15	1	32	
14	Atlético ECCA	28	1	0	27	9	58	−49	0	3	
15	Empresarios del Rincón	28	1	0	27	6	78	−72	0	3	

Updated to match(es) played on 18 April 2026. Source: Liga TDP

== Group 13 ==
Group with 14 teams from Jalisco.

=== Teams ===
Location of teams in the 2025–26 Liga TDP Group 13

Team	City	Home ground	Capacity	Affiliate	Official name
ACF Zapotlanejo	Zapotlanejo, Jalisco	Miguel Hidalgo	1,700	ACF Zapotlanejo	–
Agaveros	Tlajomulco de Zúñiga, Jalisco	Unidad Deportiva San Sebastián El Grande	1,000	–	–
Alfareros de Tonalá	Tonalá, Jalisco	Campos Mi Ranchito	500	–	–
Aves Blancas	Tepatitlán de Morelos, Jalisco	Corredor Industrial	1,200	–	–
Charales de Chapala	Chapala, Jalisco	Municipal Juan Rayo	1,200	–	–
Gorilas de Juanacatlán	Juanacatlán, Jalisco	Club Reforma	500	Gorilas de Juanacatlán	–
Jabalís Mirasol	Capilla de Guadalupe, Jalisco	Finés	1,000	–	–
Leones Negros UdeG	Zapopan, Jalisco	Club Deportivo U. de G.	3,000	Leones Negros UdeG	–
Nacional	Tlaquepaque, Jalisco	Unidad Deportiva Froc	1,000	–	–
Osos Deportivo CMG	El Salto, Jalisco	Club Deportivo Corona	500	–	Deportivo Cimagol
Tapatíos Soccer	Zapopan, Jalisco	Centro de Alto Rendimiento Tapatíos	1,000	–	–
Tecos	Zapopan, Jalisco	Cancha Anexa Tres de Marzo	1,000	Tecos	–
Tepatitlán	Tepatitlán de Morelos, Jalisco	Gregorio "Tepa" Gómez	8,085	Tepatitlán	–
Tornados Tlaquepaque	Tlajomulco de Zúñiga, Jalisco	Deportivo del Valle	1,000	Caja Oblatos	Caja Oblatos

=== League table ===
Pos	Team	Pld	W	D	L	GF	GA	GD	BP	Pts	Qualification
1	Tapatíos Soccer	26	21	3	2	81	20	+61	1	67	Liguilla de Ascenso
2	Tecos	26	18	4	4	60	27	+33	3	61	Liguilla de Filiales
3	Charales de Chapala	26	18	3	5	60	29	+31	3	60	Liguilla de Ascenso
4	Gorilas de Juanacatlán	26	14	5	7	52	23	+29	4	51	Liguilla de Filiales
5	Aves Blancas	26	14	5	7	51	32	+19	3	50	Liguilla de Ascenso
6	Tepatitlán	26	12	5	9	59	33	+26	2	43	Liguilla de Ascenso
7	Leones Negros UdeG	26	11	6	9	41	37	+4	2	41	Liguilla de Filiales
8	Alfareros de Tonalá	26	11	5	10	47	40	+7	1	39	
9	ACF Zapotlanejo	26	10	3	13	39	41	−2	3	36	
10	Nacional	26	7	7	12	21	41	−20	2	30	
11	Jabalís Mirasol	26	7	6	13	37	59	−22	3	30	
12	Osos Deportivo CMG	26	5	1	20	32	81	−49	0	16	
13	Tornados Tlaquepaque	26	4	1	21	30	65	−35	0	13	
14	Agaveros	26	2	2	22	9	91	−82	1	9	

Updated to match(es) played on 18 April 2026. Source: Liga TDP

== Group 14 ==
Group with 15 teams from Colima and Jalisco. On December 12, 2025, Oro Jalisco withdrew from the season after the club's management decided to merge the two teams it had competing in the group: Oro Jalisco and Mulos del C.D. Oro, so the second team became the club's only representative in the league. The space formerly occupied by Oro Jalisco was taken over by a new team named Cantera Rojiblancos.

=== Teams ===
Location of teams in the 2025–26 Liga TDP Group 14

Team	City	Home ground	Capacity	Affiliate	Official name
Atlético Punto Sur	Tlajomulco de Zúñiga, Jalisco	Campos Punto Sur	500	–	Suré
Atlético Tesistán	Zapopan, Jalisco	Club Pumas Tesistán	500	–	–
CAFESSA	Tlajomulco de Zúñiga, Jalisco	Unidad Deportiva Mariano Otero	3,000	–	–
Caja Oblatos Tlajomulco	Tlajomulco de Zúñiga, Jalisco	Campos Punto Sur	500	Caja Oblatos	–
Cantera Rojiblancos	Tala, Jalisco	Centro Deportivo Cultural 24 de Marzo	2,000	–	Catedráticos Elite
Cihuatlán	Cihuatlán, Jalisco	El Llanito	5,000	–	Ho Gar H. Matamoros
Deportivo Fuerza Huracán	San Isidro Mazatepec, Jalisco	La Fortaleza	1,000	–	Fénix CFAR
Diablos Tesistán	Zapopan, Jalisco	Club Diablos Tesistán	1,000	–	–
Elite Azteca	El Arenal, Jalisco	Unidad Deportiva El Arenal	1,000	–	Volcanes de Colima
Guardianes GDL	Zapopan, Jalisco	Centro de Alto Rendimiento Tapatíos	1,000	–	Aviña
Legado del Centenario	Guadalajara, Jalisco	Unidad Deportiva Cuauhtémoc	1,000	–	–
LEVET	Tlajomulco de Zúñiga, Jalisco	Quinta Fátima	500	–	Gallos Viejos
Mulos Oro	Ameca, Jalisco	Núcleo Deportivo y de Espectáculos Ameca	6,000	–	–
Real Ánimas de Sayula	Sayula, Jalisco	Gustavo Díaz Ordaz	4,000	–	–
Ynjer Cuauhtémoc	Cuauhtémoc, Colima	Unidad Deportiva Cuauhtémoc	1,000	Acatlán	Acatlán Cuauhtémoc

=== League table ===
Pos	Team	Pld	W	D	L	GF	GA	GD	BP	Pts	Qualification
1	Diablos Tesistán	28	21	4	3	116	28	+88	2	69	Liguilla de Ascenso
2	CAFESSA	28	18	7	3	72	23	+49	4	65	Liguilla de Ascenso
3	Ynjer Cuauhtémoc	28	18	3	7	60	35	+25	2	59	Liguilla de Filiales
4	Cihuatlán	28	18	3	7	57	36	+21	2	59	Liguilla de Filiales
5	Elite Azteca	28	16	6	6	64	32	+32	2	56	Liguilla de Ascenso
6	Legado del Centenario	28	15	4	9	66	45	+21	2	51	Liguilla de Ascenso
7	LEVET	28	14	5	9	62	45	+17	1	48	Liguilla de Ascenso
8	Real Ánimas de Sayula	28	13	4	11	46	49	−3	3	46	
9	Atlético Tesistán	28	11	5	12	62	60	+2	3	41	
10	Deportivo Fuerza Huracán	28	9	4	15	58	74	−16	0	31	
11	Caja Oblatos Tlajomulco	28	8	5	15	44	72	−28	2	31	
12	Guardianes GDL	28	3	7	18	30	58	−28	6	22	
13	Mulos Oro	28	6	3	19	35	72	−37	1	22	
14	Cantera Rojiblancos	28	5	2	21	25	103	−78	2	19	
15	Atlético Punto Sur	28	3	2	23	20	85	−65	0	11	

Updated to match(es) played on 19 April 2026. Source: Liga TDP

== Group 15 ==
Group with 14 teams from Jalisco and Nayarit.

=== Teams ===
Location of teams in the 2025–26 Liga TDP Group 15

Team	City	Home ground	Capacity	Affiliate	Official name
Atlético Acaponeta	Acaponeta, Nayarit	Unidad Deportiva Acaponeta	1,000	Ensenada	–
Atlético Nayarit	Tepic, Nayarit	Hilario "Diablo" Díaz	1,000	–	–
CAR Toros	Tlajomulco de Zúñiga, Jalisco	Deportivo del Valle	1,000	–	–
Gambeta	Guadalajara, Jalisco	Club Deportivo San Rafael	1,000	–	–
GDL United	Zapopan, Jalisco	Centro de Alto Rendimiento Tapatíos	1,000	Halcones	Halcones Guadalajara
Halcones de Nayarit	Tepic, Nayarit	Halcones	1,000	–	–
Moncaro	Tequila, Jalisco	Unidad Deportiva 24 de Enero	1,000	–	–
Puerto Vallarta	Puerto Vallarta, Jalisco	Canchas La Parota	2,000	–	–
Sporting AKD	Zapopan, Jalisco	Deportivo Solares	1,000	–	Castores Gobrantacto
Sufacen Tepic	Tepic, Nayarit	Club Deportivo Sufacen	1,000	–	–
Tigres de Álica	Tepic, Nayarit	Hilario "Diablo" Díaz	1,000	Tigres de Álica	–
Tigritos de Álica	Tepic, Nayarit	Hilario "Diablo" Díaz	1,000	Tigres de Álica	–
VADS	Compostela, Nayarit	Miguel Borrayo Sánchez	4,000	–	–
Xalisco	Xalisco, Nayarit	Unidad Deportiva Landareñas	1,500	–	–

=== League table ===
Pos	Team	Pld	W	D	L	GF	GA	GD	BP	Pts	Qualification
1	Tigres de Alica	25	20	5	0	61	11	+50	4	69	Liguilla de Filiales
2	Atlético Nayarit	26	18	2	6	53	21	+32	1	57	Liguilla de Filiales
3	Halcones de Nayarit	26	12	9	5	48	28	+20	7	52	Liguilla de Ascenso
4	Xalisco	26	15	4	7	36	21	+15	1	50	Liguilla de Ascenso
5	Gambeta	26	12	7	7	46	37	+9	6	49	Liguilla de Ascenso
6	Puerto Vallarta	26	11	4	11	39	40	−1	3	40	
7	Moncaro	26	10	6	10	54	48	+6	3	39	
8	GDL United	26	9	7	10	39	37	+2	2	36	
9	Sporting AKD	26	10	4	12	38	38	0	2	36	
10	Tigritos de Álica	27	9	6	12	24	34	−10	2	35	
11	Atlético Acaponeta	26	8	6	12	30	42	−12	0	30	
12	Sufacen Tepic	26	5	4	17	28	63	−35	1	20	
13	CAR Toros	26	4	3	19	17	54	−37	3	18	
14	VADS	26	2	7	17	20	59	−39	2	15	

Updated to match(es) played on 18 April 2026. Source: Liga TDP

== Group 16 ==
Group with 16 teams from Coahuila, Durango, Nuevo León and Tamaulipas.

=== Teams ===
Location of teams in the 2025–26 Liga TDP Group 16 (Nuevo León)
Location of teams in the 2025–26 Liga TDP Group 16 (Coahuila and Durango)
Location of teams in the 2025–26 Liga TDP Group 16 (Tamaulipas)

Team	City	Home ground	Capacity	Affiliate	Official name
Cadereyta	Cadereyta, Nuevo León	Clemente Salinas Netro	1,000	–	–
Calor Torreón	Ciudad Lerdo, Durango	Polideportivo Lerdo 2024	1,000	Calor	–
Correcaminos UAT	Ciudad Victoria, Tamaulipas	Eugenio Alvizo Porras	5,000	Correcaminos UAT	–
Cuervos Tec Nuevo León	Guadalupe, Nuevo León	Instituto Tecnológico de Nuevo León	1,000	–	–
Escobedo	General Escobedo, Nuevo León	Deportivo Lázaro Cárdenas	1,000	–	Real San Cosme
Gavilanes de Matamoros	Matamoros, Tamaulipas	El Hogar	22,000	Gavilanes de Matamoros	–
Guerreros Reynosa	Reynosa, Tamaulipas	Unidad Deportiva Solidaridad	15,000	–	–
Halcones de Saltillo	Saltillo, Coahuila	Olímpico Francisco I. Madero	7,000	–	–
Irritilas	San Pedro, Coahuila	Quinta Ximena	1,000	–	–
Leones de Nuevo León	Allende, Nuevo León	Parque Bicentenario	1,000	–	–
Nuevo León	San Nicolás de los Garza, Nuevo León	Unidad Deportiva Oriente	1,000	–	–
Real Apodaca	Apodaca, Nuevo León	Centenario del Ejército Mexicano	2,000	Real Apodaca	–
Saltillo Soccer	Saltillo, Coahuila	Olímpico Francisco I. Madero	7,000	–	–
San Pedro 7–10	San Pedro Garza García, Nuevo León	Sporti Valle Poniente	500	–	–
Santiago	Santiago, Nuevo León	FCD El Barrial	1,300	Santiago	–
T-Rex de Ramos Arizpe	Ramos Arizpe, Coahuila	Unidad Deportiva Ramos Arizpe	1,000	–	Querétaro 3D

=== League table ===
Pos	Team	Pld	W	D	L	GF	GA	GD	BP	Pts	Qualification
1	Santiago	30	21	5	4	70	29	+41	5	73	Liguilla de Filiales
2	Saltillo Soccer	30	21	4	5	89	35	+54	3	70	Liguilla de Ascenso
3	Irritilas	30	21	4	5	63	28	+35	1	68	Liguilla de Ascenso
4	Cadereyta	30	15	10	5	69	41	+28	3	58	Liguilla de Ascenso
5	Guerreros Reynosa	30	16	6	8	70	45	+25	4	58	Liguilla de Ascenso
6	Correcaminos UAT	30	16	4	10	53	38	+15	4	56	Liguilla de Filiales
7	T-Rex de Ramos Arizpe	30	15	5	10	58	39	+19	3	53	Liguilla de Ascenso
8	Halcones de Saltillo	30	15	5	10	64	36	+28	2	52	
9	Cuervos Tec Nuevo León	30	12	8	10	57	39	+18	3	47	
10	Gavilanes de Matamoros	30	10	7	13	38	48	−10	3	40	
11	Calor Torreón	30	9	7	14	60	67	−7	2	36	
12	Leones de Nuevo León	30	6	9	15	37	63	−26	5	32	
13	Real Apodaca	30	5	5	20	25	67	−42	2	22	
14	Escobedo	30	4	6	20	24	80	−56	3	21	
15	San Pedro 7–10	30	6	1	23	33	90	−57	1	20	
16	Nuevo León	30	4	2	24	21	86	−65	0	14	

Updated to match(es) played on 18 April 2026. Source: Liga TDP

== Group 17 ==
Group with 12 teams from Baja California, Chihuahua and Sonora.

=== Teams ===
Location of teams in the 2024–25 Liga TDP Group 17

Team	City	Home ground	Capacity	Affiliate	Official name
Atlético Tijuana	Tijuana, Baja California	Unidad Deportiva Reforma	1,000	–	–
Cachanillas	Mexicali, Baja California	Eduardo "Boticas" Pérez	2,000	–	–
CEPROFFA	Ciudad Juárez, Chihuahua	CEPROFFA	1,000	–	–
Cimarrones de Sonora	Hermosillo, Sonora	Unidad Deportiva La Milla	1,000	Cimarrones de Sonora	–
Cobras Fut Premier	Ciudad Juárez, Chihuahua	Complejo Temop Axis	500	–	–
Datileros de San Luis RC	San Luis Río Colorado, Sonora	El Musical	1,000	–	–
Delfines Baja	Tecate, Baja California	Campo Los Encinos	1,000	–	–
Etchojoa	Etchojoa, Sonora	Trigueros	1,500	–	–
La Tribu de Ciudad Juárez	Ciudad Juárez, Chihuahua	Complejo La Tribu	500	–	–
Obson Dynamo	Ciudad Obregón, Sonora	Hundido ITSON	2,000	–	–
Soles de Sonora	Hermosillo, Sonora	Miguel Castro Servín	4,000	–	–
Xolos Hermosillo	Hermosillo, Sonora	Cancha Aarón Gamal Aguirre Fimbres	1,000	Tijuana	–

=== League table ===
Pos	Team	Pld	W	D	L	GF	GA	GD	BP	Pts	Qualification
1	La Tribu de Ciudad Juárez	22	15	3	4	54	18	+36	0	48	Liguilla de Ascenso
2	Datileros de San Luis RC	22	11	8	3	44	25	+19	5	46	Liguilla de Ascenso
3	Etchojoa	22	13	4	5	37	23	+14	3	46	Liguilla de Ascenso
4	Soles de Sonora	22	11	6	5	40	24	+16	5	44	Liguilla de Ascenso
5	Obson Dynamo	22	12	5	5	40	25	+15	2	43	
6	Atlético Tijuana	22	11	5	6	35	30	+5	3	41	
7	Cimarrones de Sonora	22	8	8	6	33	22	+11	4	36	Liguilla de Filiales
8	Cachanillas	22	7	7	8	38	38	0	4	32	
9	CEPROFFA	23	4	8	11	19	32	−13	4	24	
10	Xolos Hermosillo	23	5	5	13	25	32	−7	0	20	
11	Cobras Fut Premier	22	2	7	13	29	55	−26	3	16	
12	Delfines Baja	22	1	0	21	11	81	−70	0	3	

Updated to match(es) played on 18 April 2026. Source: Liga TDP

== Promotion Play–offs ==
The Promotion Play–offs will consist of seven phases. Classify 64 teams, the number varies according to the number of teams in each group, being between three and eight clubs per group. The country will be divided into two zones: Zone A (Groups 1 to 9) and Zone B (Groups 10 to 17). Eliminations will be held according to the average obtained by each team, being ordered from best to worst by their percentage throughout the season.

As of 2020–21 season, the names of the knockout stages were modified as follows: Round of 32, Round of 16, Quarter-finals, Semifinals, Zone Final and Final, this as a consequence of the division of the country into two zones, for so the teams only face clubs from the same region until the final match.

=== Round of 32 ===
The first legs were played on 22 and 23 April, and the second legs will be played on 25 and 26 April 2026.

==== Zona A ====
Team 1	Agg.	Team 2	1st leg	2nd leg
Yautepec	5–0	Deportivo Metepec	1–0	4–0
Águilas UAGro	6–4	CEFOR Chiapas	1–1	5–3
Delfines de Coatzacoalcos (p)	4–4 (6–5)	Caballeros de Córdoba	3–2	1–2
Lechuzas UPGCH	3–1	Itzaes	1–0	2–1
Aztecas AMF Soccer	2–3	Atlético Cuernavaca	1–2	1–1
Bombarderos de Tecámac	4–3	Ejidatarios de Bonfil	1–3	3–0
Álamos	0–2	Delfines UGM	0–1	0–1
Orishas Tepeji	5–1	Valle de Xico	4–1	1–0
Sk Sport Street Soccer	5–2	Sangre de Campeón	3–2	2–0
CARSAF	2–1	Atlético InterCapital	2–1	0–0
Cruz Azul Lagunas	8–0	Cantera Coka	1–0	7–0
Halcones Negros	6–5	Académicos UGM	4–1	2–4
Muxes	4–1	PDLA	2–1	2–0
Orgullo Surtam	1–0	Politécnico	0–0	1–0
Corsarios de Campeche	1–2	Estudiantes	1–2	0–0
Ecatepec	7–2	Ocelot Academy MX	2–1	5–1

==== Zone B ====
Team 1	Agg.	Team 2	1st leg	2nd leg
Tapatíos Soccer	1–2	Tepatitlán	1–2	0–0
Diablos Tesistán	0–1	LEVET Jalisco	0–1	0–0
Estudiantes de Querétaro	6–3	Deportivo Sahuayo	2–2	4–1
Cachorros de León (p)	3–3 (5–4)	T–Rex de Ramos Arizpe	2–1	1–2
Saltillo Soccer	7–6	Cefor Promotora San Luis	2–5	5–1
CAFESSA	1–1 (2–4)	(p) Atlético Leonés	0–0	1–1
Charales de Chapala	3–1	H2O Purépechas	3–1	0–0
Magos del Rincón	3–1	Leyendas	2–1	1–0
Irritilas	7–1	Legado del Centenario	2–1	5–0
La Tribu de Juárez	10–0	Gambeta	3–0	7–0
La Piedad Querétaro	3–4	La Piedad Imperial	2–3	1–1
Titanes de Querétaro	0–2	Xalisco	0–1	0–1
Datileros de San Luis RC	3–4	Aves Blancas	1–1	2–3
Etchojoa (p)	1–1 (4–3)	Guerreros Reynosa	0–1	1–0
Elite Azteca	4–2	Cadereyta	2–1	2–1
Halcones de Nayarit	2–5	Soles de Sonora	2–2	0–3

=== Round of 16 ===
The first legs were played on 29 and 30 April, and the second legs were played on 2 and 3 May 2026.

==== Zone A ====
Team 1	Agg.	Team 2	1st leg	2nd leg
Yautepec	2–2 (2–4)	(p) Atlético Cuernavaca	2–1	0–1
Águilas UAGro	1–0	Delfines UGM	0–0	1–0
Delfines de Coatzacoalcos	6–1	Estudiantes	3–0	3–1
Lechuzas UPGCH	5–2	Ecatepec	1–1	4–1
Bombarderos de Tecámac	2–0	Orgullo Surtam	2–0	0–0
Orishas Tepeji	2–3	Muxes	0–2	2–1
Sk Sport Street Soccer	2–3	Halcones Negros	1–2	1–1
CARSAF	0–6	Cruz Azul Lagunas	0–3	0–3

==== Zone B ====
Team 1	Agg.	Team 2	1st leg	2nd leg
Estudiantes de Querétaro	1–2	Tepatitlán	1–2	0–0
Cachorros de León	5–2	LEVET Jalisco	3–1	2–1
Saltillo Soccer	4–2	Atlético Leonés	2–1	2–1
Charales de Chapala	6–1	La Piedad Imperial	4–1	2–0
Magos	1–1 (2–4)	(p) Xalisco	1–0	0–1
Irritilas	2–4	Aves Blancas	1–2	1–2
La Tribu de Juárez	4–1	Soles de Sonora	2–0	2–1
Etchojoa (p)	3–3 (4–3)	Elite Azteca	1–2	2–1

=== Final stage ===
Zone Quarter–finals
2A	Delfines de Coatzacoalcos	1	2	3
7A	Muxes	0	2	2
3A	Lechuzas UPGCH	2	4	6
6A	Halcones Negros	0	1	1
1A	Águilas UAGro	2	2	4
8A	Atlético Cuernavaca	0	2	2
4A	Bombarderos de Tecámac	0	0	0
5A	Cruz Azul Lagunas	4	2	6
2B	Saltillo Soccer (p)	1	2	3 (4)
7B	Xalisco	1	2	3 (3)
3B	Charales de Chapala (p)	0	2	2 (2)
6B	Aves Blancas	2	0	2 (1)
1B	Cachorros de León	1	3	4
8B	Tepatitlán	1	1	2
4B	La Tribu de Ciudad Juárez	0	2	2
5B	Etchojoa	1	0	1

Zone Semi–finals
2A	Delfines de Coatzacoalcos (p)	1	3	4 (3)
3A	Lechuzas UPGCH	3	1	4 (3)
1A	Águilas UAGro	0	0	0
5A	Cruz Azul Lagunas	2	0	2
2B	Saltillo Soccer	2	4	6
3B	Charales de Chapala	1	2	3
1B	Cachorros de León	1	3	4 (9)
4B	La Tribu de Ciudad Juárez (p)	2	2	4 (10)

Zone Finals
2A	Delfines de Coatzacoalcos (p)	0	3	3 (3)
5A	Cruz Azul Lagunas	2	1	3 (1)
2B	Saltillo Soccer	3	5	8
4B	La Tribu de Ciudad Juárez	3	3	6

National Final
2A	Delfines de Coatzacoalcos	1
2B	Saltillo Soccer	0

==== Zone Quarter–finals ====
The first legs were played on 6 and 7 May, and the second legs were played on 9 and 10 May 2026.

Team 1	Agg.	Team 2	1st leg	2nd leg
Águilas UAGro	4–2	Atlético Cuernavaca	2–0	2–2
Delfines de Coatzacoalcos	3–2	Muxes	1–0	2–2
Lechuzas UPGCH	6–1	Halcones Negros	2–0	4–1
Bombarderos de Tecámac	0–6	Cruz Azul Lagunas	0–4	0–2
Cachorros de León	4–2	Tepatitlán	1–1	3–1
Saltillo Soccer (p)	3–3 (4–3)	Xalisco	1–1	2–2
Charales de Chapala (p)	2–2 (2–1)	Aves Blancas	0–2	2–0
La Tribu de Ciudad Juárez	2–1	Etchojoa	0–1	2–0

Matches

6 May 2026
15:30 CST (UTC−6)

Atlético Cuernavaca	0–2	Águilas UAGro
	Report	Martínez 1'; Chavelas 46'

Campo La Escuelita, Xochitepec
Referee: Pablo Eduardo Benítez
9 May 2026
14:00 CST (UTC−6)

Águilas UAGro	2–2	Atlético Cuernavaca
Chavelas 12'; Mendoza 86'	Report	Benítez 76'; Álvarez 80'

Estadio Universitario UAGro, Chilpancingo
Referee: Luis Felipe Villafuerte

Águilas UAGro won 4–2 on aggregate.

6 May 2026
12:00 CST (UTC−6)

Muxes	0–1	Delfines de Coatzacoalcos
	Report	Lara 13'

Deportivo Lázaro Cárdenas, Mexico City
Referee: Edwin Alejandro Marín
9 May 2026
16:00 CST (UTC−6)

Delfines de Coatzacoalcos	2–2	Muxes
Ordaz 10'; Pang 89'	Report	García 13'; Bernal 49'

Estadio Rafael Hernández Ochoa, Coatzacoalcos
Referee: Mauricio Roque Trejo

Delfines de Coatzacoalcos won 3–2 on aggregate.

6 May 2026
19:00 CST (UTC−6)

Halcones Negros	0–2	Lechuzas UPGCH
	Report	Ballinas 41'; Velasco 68'

Estadio Municipal Claudio Suárez, Texcoco
Referee: Adan Peña Tivido
9 May 2026
15:00 CST (UTC−6)

Lechuzas UPGCH	4–1	Halcones Negros
Aguilar 1'; Cruz 15'; López 32'; Vázquez 81'	Report	Díaz 50'

Estadio Flor de Sospó, Tuxtla Gutiérrez
Referee: Edder Daniel Álvarez

Lechuzas UPGCH won 6–1 on aggregate.

6 May 2026
15:00 CST (UTC−6)

Cruz Azul Lagunas	4–0	Bombarderos de Tecámac
Sotelo 32', 64'; Toscano 45'; Ramírez 86'	Report

Estadio Cruz Azul, Lagunas
Referee: Elmer Leonardo Alegría
9 May 2026
15:00 CST (UTC−6)

Bombarderos de Tecámac	0–2	Cruz Azul Lagunas
	Report	Sotelo 19', 41'

Deportivo Sierra Hermosa, Tecámac
Referee: Axel Jesús Ibares

Cruz Azul Lagunas won 0–6 on aggregate.

6 May 2026
19:00 CST (UTC−6)

Tepatitlán	1–1	Cachorros de León
López 58'	Report	Calderas 69'

Estadio Gregorio "Tepa" Gómez, Tepatitlán
Referee: Ricardo Sebastián Arellano
9 May 2026
16:00 CST (UTC−6)

Cachorros de León	3–1	Tepatitlán
	Report

Instituto Oviedo Náutico, León
Referee: Karol Jesús Zamudio

Cachorros de León won 4–2 on aggregate.

6 May 2026
11:00 MST (UTC−7)

Xalisco	1–1	Saltillo Soccer
Madrigal 77'	Report	Ordóñez 66'

Unidad Deportiva Landareñas, Xalisco
Referee: Marco Daniel Rodríguez
9 May 2026
17:00 CST (UTC−6)

Saltillo Soccer	2–2	Xalisco
Martínez 45'; Cornejo 52'	Report	Hernández 40'; Madrigal 84'
Penalties
	4–3

Estadio Olímpico Francisco I. Madero, Saltillo
Referee: Juan Daniel Peña

3–3 on aggregate. Saltillo Soccer advanced after winning 4–3 in the penalty shoot-out.

6 May 2026
18:00 CST (UTC−6)

Aves Blancas	2–0	Charales de Chapala
Reynoso 78'; Camarena 90'	Report

Estadio Corredor Industrial, Tepatitlán
Referee: Pedro Alberto Reyes
9 May 2026
19:00 CST (UTC−6)

Charales de Chapala	2–0	Aves Blancas
Ascencio 25'; Ramírez 77'	Report
Penalties
	2–1

Estadio Municipal Juan Rayo, Chapala
Referee: José Cristian González

2–2 on aggregate. Charales de Chapala advanced after winning 2–1 in the penalty shoot-out.

7 May 2026
19:00 MST (UTC−7)

Etchojoa	1–0	La Tribu de Ciudad Juárez
Jordán 48'	Report

Estadio Trigueros, Etchojoa
Referee: Joan Antonio Soto
10 May 2026
14:00 MDT (UTC−6)

La Tribu de Ciudad Juárez	2–0	Etchojoa
Díaz 40', 44'	Report

Complejo Deportivo La Tribu, Ciudad Juárez
Referee: Carlos Omar Cruz

La Tribu de Ciudad Juárez won 2–1 on aggregate.

==== Zone Semi–finals ====
The first legs were played on 13 May, and the second legs were played on 16 May 2026.

Team 1	Agg.	Team 2	1st leg	2nd leg
Águilas UAGro	0–2	Cruz Azul Lagunas	0–2	0–0
Delfines de Coatzacoalcos (p)	4–4 (3–1)	Lechuzas UPGCH	1–3	3–1
Cachorros de León	4–4 (9–10)	La Tribu de Ciudad Juárez	1–2	3–2
Saltillo Soccer	6–3	Charales de Chapala	2–1	4–2

Matches

13 May 2026
15:00 CST (UTC−6)

Cruz Azul Lagunas	2–0	Águilas UAGro
Cruz 28'; García 60'	Report

Estadio Cruz Azul, Lagunas
Referee: Miguel Ángel Ramírez
16 May 2026
14:00 CST (UTC−6)

Águilas UAGro	0–0	Cruz Azul Lagunas
	Report

Estadio Universitario UAGro, Chilpancingo
Referee: Adan Peña Tivido

Cruz Azul Lagunas won 0–2 on aggregate.

13 May 2016
15:00 CST (UTC−6)

Lechuzas UPGCH	3–1	Delfines de Coatzacoalcos
Ruiz 74'; López 79'; Cabrera 86'	Report	Camarero 18'

Estadio Flor de Sospó, Tuxtla Gutiérrez
Referee: Jimmy Acosta Pérez
16 May 2016
16:00 CST (UTC−6)

Delfines de Coatzacoalcos	3–1	Lechuzas UPGCH
Ramos 5'; Castillo 36'; Álvarez 76'	Report	Ruiz 61'
Penalties
	3–1

Estadio Rafael Hernández Ochoa, Coatzacoalcos
Referee: Juan Carlos García

4–4 on aggregate. Delfines de Coatzacoalcos advanced after winning 3–1 in the penalty shoot-out.

13 May 2016
15:00 MDT (UTC−6)

La Tribu de Ciudad Juárez	2–1	Cachorros de León
Mena 59', 78'	Report	Calderas 5'

Complejo Deportivo La Tribu, Ciudad Juárez
Referee: Juan Daniel Peña
16 May 2016
16:00 CST (UTC−6)

Cachorros de León	3–2	La Tribu de Ciudad Juárez
Cienega 65'; Sánchez 67'; Aguado 90'	Report	Alvarado 75'; Telles 78'
Penalties
	9–10

Instituto Oviedo Náutico, León
Referee: José Cristian González

4–4 on aggregate. La Tribu de Ciudad Juárez advanced after winning 9–10 in the penalty shoot-out.

13 May 2016
19:00 CST (UTC−6)

Charales de Chapala	1–2	Saltillo Soccer
Enciso 8'	Report	Ordóñez 29'; Rodríguez 55'

Estadio Municipal Juan Rayo, Chapala
Referee: Axel Jesús Ibares
16 May 2016
17:00 CST (UTC−6)

Saltillo Soccer	4–2	Charales de Chapala
Medina 16'; Martínez 22'; Ordóñez 59'; Vara 68'	Report	Ascencio 36'; Radillo 64'

Estadio Olímpico Francisco I. Madero, Saltillo
Referee: Carlos Omar Cruz

Saltillo Soccer won 6–3 on aggregate.

==== Zone Finals ====
The first legs were played on 20 and 21 May, and the second legs were played on 23 and 24 May 2026.

Team 1	Agg.	Team 2	1st leg	2nd leg
Delfines de Coatzacoalcos	3–3 (3–1)	Cruz Azul Lagunas	0–2	3–1
Saltillo Soccer	8–6	La Tribu de Ciudad Juárez	3–3	5–3

20 May 2026
15:00 CST (UTC−6)

Cruz Azul Lagunas	2–0	Delfines de Coatzacoalcos
Sotelo 83', 88'	Report

Estadio Cruz Azul, Lagunas
Attendance: 600
Referee: Mauricio Roque Trejo
23 May 2026
15:00 CST (UTC−6)

Delfines de Coatzacoalcos	3–1	Cruz Azul Lagunas
Camarero 19'; Lara 30', 59'	Report	Toscano 8'

Estadio Rafael Hernández Ochoa, Coatzacoalcos
Attendance: 4,500
Referee: Luis Felipe Villafuerte

3–3 on aggregate. Delfines de Coatzacoalcos advanced after winning 3–1 in the penalty shoot-out.

21 May 2026
16:00 MDT (UTC−6)

La Tribu de Ciudad Juárez	3–3	Saltillo Soccer
Grijalva 8'; Díaz 44', 48'	Report	Rodríguez 7'; Medina 70'; Martínez 86'

Complejo Deportivo La Tribu, Ciudad Juárez
Attendance: 650
Referee: Juan Daniel Peña
24 May 2026
19:00 CST (UTC−6)

Saltillo Soccer	5–3	La Tribu de Ciudad Juárez
Ordóñez 12'; Martínez 20', 45'; Malacara 29'; Briones 69'	Report	Grijalva 35', 42'; Díaz 49'

Estadio Olímpico Francisco I. Madero, Saltillo
Attendance: 8,000
Referee: Abraham Guadalupe Espinoza

Saltillo Soccer won 8–6 on aggregate.

==== National Final ====
The match was played on 29 May 2026.

Team 1	Score	Team 2
Delfines de Coatzacoalcos	1–0	Saltillo Soccer

29 May 2026
15:00 CST (UTC−6)

Delfines de Coatzacoalcos	1–0	Saltillo Soccer
Ramos 27'	Report

Estadio de la FMF, Toluca
Attendance: 500
Referee: José Cristian González

== Reserve and Development Teams ==
Each season a table is created among those teams that don't have the right to promote, because they are considered as reserve teams for teams that play in Liga MX, Liga de Expansión and Liga Premier or are independent teams that have requested not to participate for the Promotion due to the fact that they are footballers development projects. The ranking order is determined through the "quotient", which is obtained by dividing the points obtained between the disputed matches, being ordered from highest to lowest. Starting this season, the league decided to divide these teams into two regions, as it happens with the promotion play-offs, so in the final phase the teams will only face rivals from their region, until reaching the national final, which will pit the two regional champions of this modality of the league against each other.

=== Tables ===
South Zone

P	Team	Pts	G	Pts/G	GD
1	Racing de Veracruz	75	28	2.679	+75
2	Pachuca	75	30	2.500	+84
3	Pioneros Junior	53	22	2.409	+23
4	Héroes de Zaci CDMX	61	30	2.033	+36
5	Chapulineros de Oaxaca	57	30	1.900	+20
6	Irapuato Olimpo	55	30	1.833	+12
7	Inter Playa del Carmen	40	22	1.818	+18
8	Cordobés	47	26	1.808	+18
9	Artesanos Metepec	47	26	1.808	+11
10	Deportiva Venados	39	22	1.773	+18
11	Dragones Toluca	46	26	1.769	+16
12	Alebrijes de Oaxaca	53	30	1.767	+25
13	Dragones de Oaxaca	53	30	1.767	+15
14	Boston Cancún	38	22	1.727	+11
15	Alebrijes CDMX	50	30	1.667	+17
16	Tapachula	47	30	1.567	+13
17	Toros México	46	30	1.533	+17
18	Balam–Jaguares	40	30	1.333	–6
19	Montañeses Potros Casino Español	37	28	1.321	–20
20	Napoli Tabasco	39	30	1.300	–8
21	Alebrijes Teotihuacán	29	30	0.967	–38
22	Mineros CDMX	28	30	0.933	–51
23	Academia Dragones	18	30	0.600	–51
24	Universidad Euroamericana	18	30	0.600	–62
25	Hermanos Benítez	14	26	0.538	–37
26	Sporting Canamy	13	30	0.433	–64
27	Cañoneros	6	28	0.214	–97
28	Aragón	6	28	0.214	–102
29	Héroes de Zaci Hidalgo	6	30	0.200	–184

Last updated: April 18, 2026
Source: Liga TDP
P = Position; G = Games played; Pts = Points; Pts/G = Ratio of points to games played; GD = Goal difference

North Zone

P	Team	Pts	G	Pts/G	GD
1	Tigres de Álica	72	26	2.769	+52
2	Atlético Morelia – Universidad Michoacana	52	20	2.600	+42
3	Santiago	73	30	2.433	+41
4	Irapuato	67	28	2.393	+51
5	Tecos	61	26	2.346	+34
6	Atlético Nayarit	57	26	2.192	+32
7	Ynjer Cuauhtémoc	59	28	2.107	+25
8	Cihuatlán	59	28	2.107	+21
9	Gorilas de Juanacatlán	51	26	1.962	+29
10	Deportivo Lázaro Cárdenas	38	20	1.900	+6
11	Mineros de Zacatecas	53	28	1.893	+10
12	Correcaminos UAT	56	30	1.867	+15
13	Lobos ULMX	39	22	1.773	+15
14	León GEN	49	28	1.750	–7
15	Cimarrones de Sonora	36	22	1.636	+11
16	Leones Negros UdeG	41	26	1.577	+4
17	Necaxa	44	28	1.571	+3
18	Halcones AFU	29	20	1.450	–7
19	GDL United	36	26	1.385	+2
20	ACF Zapotlanejo	36	26	1.385	–2
21	Gavilanes de Matamoros	40	30	1.333	–10
22	Tigritos de Álica	32	26	1.231	–11
23	Tuzos UAZ	34	28	1.214	–9
24	Calor Torreón	36	30	1.200	–9
25	Atlético Acaponeta	30	26	1.154	–12
26	Caja Oblatos Tlajomulco	31	28	1.107	–28
27	Cajeteros Celaya	23	22	1.045	–7
28	Xolos Hermosillo	19	22	0.864	–7
29	Sufacen Tepic	20	26	0.769	–35
30	Real Apodaca	22	30	0.733	–42
31	VADS	15	26	0.577	–39
32	Tornados Tlaquepaque	13	26	0.500	–35

Last updated: April 18, 2026
Source: Liga TDP
P = Position; G = Games played; Pts = Points; Pts/G = Ratio of points to games played; GD = Goal difference

=== Play–offs ===
==== Round of 32 ====
The first legs were played on 25 and 26 April, and the second legs were played on 2 and 3 May 2026.

Team 1	Agg.	Team 2	1st leg	2nd leg
Racing de Veracruz	3–1	Tapachula	1–0	2–1
Pachuca	2–0	Alebrijes CDMX	1–0	1–0
Pioneros Junior (p)	2–2 (4–2)	Boston Cancún	1–1	1–1
Héroes de Zaci CDMX	1–1 (2–4)	(p) Dragones de Oaxaca	1–0	0–1
Chapulineros de Oaxaca	4–1	Alebrijes de Oaxaca	2–0	2–1
Irapuato Olimpo	1–2	Dragones Toluca	1–1	0–1
Inter Playa del Carmen	2–2 (2–4)	(p) Deportiva Venados	1–1	1–1
Cordobés	1–0	Artesanos Metepec	0–0	1–0
Tigres de Álica	4–0	Leones Negros UdeG	3–0	1–0
Atlético Morelia – Universidad Michoacana	4–2	Cimarrones de Sonora	2–1	2–1
Santiago	5–0	León GEN	2–0	3–0
Irapuato	4–1	Lobos ULMX	2–0	2–1
Tecos	4–2	Correcaminos UAT	2–2	2–0
Atlético Nayarit	1–3	Mineros de Zacatecas	0–1	1–2
Ynjer Cuauhtémoc	2–2 (5–6)	(p) Deportivo Lázaro Cárdenas	1–1	1–1
Cihuatlán	1–4	Gorilas de Juanacatlán	0–4	1–0

=== Final stage ===
Round of 16
1A	Racing de Veracruz	1	2	3
8A	Dragones de Oaxaca	0	1	1
3A	Pioneros Júnior	2	0	2
6A	Deportiva Venados	2	2	4
2A	Pachuca	3	5	8
7A	Dragones Toluca	0	2	2
4A	Chapulineros de Oaxaca	1	1	2
5A	Cordobés	3	0	3
2B	Atlético Morelia – UMNSH	1	4	5
7B	Deportivo Lázaro Cárdenas	1	1	2
4B	Irapuato	3	1	4 (4)
5B	Tecos (p)	1	3	4 (5)
1B	Tigres de Álica (p)	0	2	2 (4)
8B	Mineros de Zacatecas	2	2	2 (3)
3B	Santiago	0	1	1
6B	Gorilas de Juanacatlán	2	0	2

Quarter–finals
1A	Racing de Veracruz	1	1	2
6A	Deportiva Venados	1	0	1
2A	Pachuca	1	5	6
5A	Cordobés	1	1	2
2B	Atlético Morelia – UMNSH	2	2	4
5B	Tecos	2	1	3
1B	Tigres de Álica	1	1	2
6B	Gorilas de Juanacatlán	2	3	5

Semi–finals
1A	Racing de Veracruz (p)	1	1	2 (4)
2A	Pachuca	2	0	2 (3)
2B	Atlético Morelia – UMNSH	0	1	1
6B	Gorilas de Juanacatlán	0	0	0

Final
1A	Racing de Veracruz	1
2B	Atlético Morelia – UMNSH	0

==== Round of 16 ====
The first legs were played on 6 and 7 May, and the second legs were played on 9 and 10 May 2026.

Team 1	Agg.	Team 2	1st leg	2nd leg
Racing de Veracruz	3–1	Dragones de Oaxaca	1–0	2–1
Pachuca	8–2	Dragones Toluca	3–0	5–2
Pioneros Júnior	2–4	Deportiva Venados	2–2	0–2
Chapulineros de Oaxaca	2–3	Cordobés	1–3	1–0
Tigres de Álica (p)	2–2 (4–3)	Mineros de Zacatecas	0–2	2–0
Atlético Morelia – UMNSH	5–2	Deportivo Lázaro Cárdenas	1–1	4–1
Santiago	1–2	Gorilas de Juanacatlán	0–2	1–0
Irapuato	4–4 (4–5)	(p) Tecos	3–1	1–3

Matches

6 May 2026
16:00 CST (UTC−6)

Dragones de Oaxaca	0–1	Racing de Veracruz
	Report	Uribe 37'

Estadio Tecnológico de Oaxaca, Oaxaca
Referee: Jimmy Acosta Pérez
9 May 2026
15:00 CST (UTC−6)

Racing de Veracruz	2–1	Dragones de Oaxaca
Padilla 34'; Sánchez 60'	Report	Vidales 69' (own)

Estadio Gustavo Pacheco Villaseñor, Tuxtepec
Referee: Javier Aldair Luqueño

Racing de Veracruz won 3–1 on aggregate.

6 May 2026
16:00 CST (UTC−6)

Dragones Toluca	0–3	Pachuca
	Report	Rosales 10'; Ruiz 33', 41'

Deportiva San Antonio Buenavista UAEM, Toluca
Referee: José Nicolás Durán
9 May 2026
10:00 CST (UTC−6)

Pachuca	5–2	Dragones Toluca
Bautista 12'; Rodríguez 14', 17'; Ortega 61'; Hernández 88'	Report	Ortega 61' (own); Escudero 65'

Universidad del Fútbol, San Agustín Tlaxiaca
Referee: Jorge Ignacio Hernández

Pachuca won 8–2 on aggregate.

7 May 2026
15:00 CST (UTC−6)

Deportiva Venados	2–2	Pioneros Júnior
Gutiérrez 9'; Dzul 43'	Report	Valdez 53'; Flores 90'

Estadio Alonso Diego Molina, Tamanché
Referee: Sergio Iván Jiménez
10 May 2026
16:00 EST (UTC−5)

Pioneros Júnior	0–2	Deportiva Venados
	Report	López 16'; Dzul 37'

Estadio Cancún 86, Cancún
Referee: Miguel Ángel Ramírez

Deportiva Venados won 2–4 on aggregate.

6 May 2026
16:00 CST (UTC−6)

Cordobés	3–1	Chapulineros de Oaxaca
Treviño 58', 79'; Ochoa 71'	Report	Laredo 30'

Estadio Alberto Pérez Navarro, Huixquilucan
Referee: Ángel Manuel Monroy
9 May 2026
16:00 CST (UTC−6)

Chapulineros de Oaxaca	1–0	Cordobés
De la Cruz 66'	Report

Estadio Independiente MRCI, San Jerónimo Tlacochahuaya
Referee: Juan Carlos García

Cordobés won 2–3 on aggregate.

7 May 2026
11:00 CST (UTC−6)

Mineros de Zacatecas	2–0	Tigres de Álica
Ibarra 9'; Castillo 80'	Report

Estadio Carlos Vega Villalba, Zacatecas
Referee: César Eduardo Aguiñiga
10 May 2026
16:00 MST (UTC−7)

Tigres de Álica	2–0	Mineros de Zacatecas
	Report
Penalties
	4–3

Estadio Nicolás Álvarez Ortega, Tepic
Referee: Jairo Arnoldo Lozano

2–2 on aggregate. Tigres de Álica advanced after winning 4–3 in the penalty shoot-out.

7 May 2026
17:00 CST (UTC−6)

Deportivo Lázaro Cárdenas	1–1	Atlético Morelia – UMNSH
Gómez 47'	Report	Lara 25'

Unidad Deportiva Lázaro Cárdenas, Lázaro Cárdenas
Referee: Diego Alberto Hernández
10 May 2026
12:00 CST (UTC−6)

Atlético Morelia – UMNSH	4–1	Deportivo Lázaro Cárdenas
Millán 3'; Castro 33'; Sánchez 50'; Lara 79'	Report	García 72'

Estadio Venustiano Carranza, Morelia
Referee: Julio Humberto Acero

Atlético Morelia – UMNSH won 5–2 on aggregate.

6 May 2026
19:30 CST (UTC−6)

Gorilas de Juanacatlán	2–0	Santiago
Díaz 52'; Rodríguez 68'	Report

Club Juanacatlán, Juanacatlán
Referee: Diego Fernando Gaytán
9 May 2026
11:00 CST (UTC−6)

Santiago	1–0	Gorilas de Juanacatlán
Domínguez 89'	Report

Cancha FCD El Barrial, Santiago
Referee: Abraham Guadalupe Espinoza

Gorilas de Juanacatlán won 1–2 on aggregate.

7 May 2026
16:00 CST (UTC−6)

Tecos	1–3	Irapuato
Torres 45'	Report	Martínez 15', 38'; Ortiz 61'

Cancha Alterna Tres de Marzo, Zapopan
Referee: Jaime Gustavo Saldaña
10 May 2026
15:00 CST (UTC−6)

Irapuato	1–3	Tecos
Briseño 77'	Report	Torres 45'; Reyes 57'; Ramírez 80'
Penalties
	4–5

Campo Fertijoaquín, Abasolo

4–4 on aggregate. Tecos advanced after winning 4–5 in the penalty shoot-out.

==== Quarter–finals ====
The first legs were played on 13 and 14 May, and the second legs were played on 16 and 17 May 2026.

Team 1	Agg.	Team 2	1st leg	2nd leg
Racing de Veracruz	2–1	Deportiva Venados	1–1	1–0
Pachuca	6–2	Cordobés	1–1	5–1
Tigres de Álica	2–5	Gorilas de Juanacatlán	1–2	1–3
Atlético Morelia – UMNSH	4–3	Tecos	2–2	2–1

Matches

13 May 2026
15:00 CST (UTC−6)

Deportiva Venados	1–1	Racing de Veracruz
Cachón 14'	Report	Vidales 68'

Estadio Alonso Diego Molina, Tamanché
Referee: Luis Felipe Villafuerte
16 May 2026
15:00 CST (UTC−6)

Racing de Veracruz	1–0	Deportiva Venados
Uribe 41'	Report

Estadio Gustavo Pacheco Villaseñor, Tuxtepec
Referee: Mauricio Roque Trejo

Racing de Veracruz won 2–1 on aggregate.

13 May 2026
16:00 CST (UTC−6)

Cordobés	1–1	Pachuca
Godínez 72'	Report	Keiser 39'

Estadio Alberto Pérez Navarro, Huixquilucan
Referee: Diego Alberto Hernández
16 May 2026
10:00 CST (UTC−6)

Pachuca	5–1	Cordobés
Pérez 15'; Bautista 47'; Ramos 50'; Rodríguez 58'; Marroquín 90'	Report	Treviño 22'

Universidad del Fútbol, San Agustín Tlaxiaca

Pachuca won 6–2 on aggregate.

14 May 2026
19:30 CST (UTC−6)

Gorilas de Juanacatlán	2–1	Tigres de Álica
Espinoza 23'; García 87'	Report	Benítez 65'

Club Juanacatlán, Juanacatlán
Referee: Jaime Gustavo Saldaña
17 May 2026
16:00 MST (UTC−7)

Tigres de Álica	1–3	Gorilas de Juanacatlán
Santana 47'	Report	Díaz 31'; Peña 38'; Andrade 75'

Estadio Nicolás Álvarez Ortega, Tepic
Referee: Pablo Eduardo Benítez

Gorilas de Juanacatlán won 2–5 on aggregate.

14 May 2026
10:00 CST (UTC−6)

Tecos	2–2	Atlético Morelia – UMNSH
Torres 8'; Hernández 32'	Report	Lara 35'; Castro 38'

Cancha Alterna Tres de Marzo, Zapopan
Referee: Abraham Guadalupe Espinoza
17 May 2026
12:00 CST (UTC−6)

Atlético Morelia – UMNSH	2–1	Tecos
Pizano 36'; González 60'	Report	Torres 75'

Estadio Universitario UMSNH, Morelia
Referee: Sergio Iván Jiménez

Atlético Morelia – UMNSH won 4–3 on aggregate.

==== Semi–finals ====
The first legs were played on 20 and 21 May, and the second legs will be played on 23 and 24 May 2026.

Team 1	Agg.	Team 2	1st leg	2nd leg
Racing de Veracruz (p)	2–2 (4–3)	Pachuca	1–2	1–0
Atlético Morelia – UMNSH	1–0	Gorilas de Juanacatlán	0–0	1–0

Matches

20 May 2026
10:00 CST (UTC−6)

Pachuca	2–1	Racing de Veracruz
Grijalva 3'; Rodríguez 30'	Report	Uribe 14'

Universidad del Fútbol, San Agustín Tlaxiaca
Referee: Julio Humberto Acero
23 May 2026
15:00 CST (UTC−6)

Racing de Veracruz	1–0	Pachuca
Padilla 2'	Report
Penalties
	4–3

Estadio Gustavo Pacheco Villaseñor, Tuxtepec
Referee: Miguel Ángel Ramírez

2–2 on aggregate. Racing de Veracruz advanced after winning 4–3 in the penalty shoot-out.

21 May 2026
18:30 CST (UTC−6)

Gorilas de Juanacatlán	0–0	Atlético Morelia – UMNSH
	Report

Club Juanacatlán, Juanacatlán
Referee: Carlos Omar Cruz
24 May 2026
12:00 CST (UTC−6)

Atlético Morelia – UMNSH	1–0	Gorilas de Juanacatlán
Castro 70' (pen.)	Report

Estadio Morelos, Morelia
Referee: Adan Peña Tivido

Atlético Morelia – UMNSH won 1–0 on aggregate.

==== Final ====
The match was played on 29 May 2026.

Team 1	Score	Team 2
Racing de Veracruz	1–0	Atlético Morelia – UMNSH

29 May 2026
10:00 CST (UTC−6)

Racing de Veracruz	1–0	Atlético Morelia – UMNSH
Vidales 81'	Report

Estadio de la FMF, Toluca
Attendance: 1,000
Referee: Pablo Eduardo Benítez

== Regular season statistics ==
=== Top goalscorers ===
Players sorted first by goals scored, then by last name.

Rank	Player	Club	Goals
1	(Mexico) Daniel Ramos	Halcones Negros	77
2	(Mexico) Alexander Pozos	Sk Sport Street Soccer	72
3	(Mexico) Manuel Granados	Ecatepec	44
4	(Mexico) Daniel Lara	Delfines de Coatzacoalcos	38
5	(Mexico) Brandon Arias	CAR América Leyendas	36
6	(Mexico) Daniel Cruz	Lechuzas UPGCH	30
7	(Mexico) Daniel Parra	Legado del Centenario	29
8	(Mexico) Román Domínguez	CH Fútbol Club	28
9	(Mexico) Rafael Niño	Sangre de Campeón	27
9	(Mexico) Gerardo Pérez	Ecatepec	27

Source:Liga TDP

== See also ==
- 2025–26 Liga MX season
- 2025–26 Liga de Expansión MX season
- 2025–26 Serie A de México season
- 2025–26 Serie B de México season
- 2026 Copa Conecta
