= Delfines de Coatzacoalcos =

- Full name: Deportivo Delfines de Coatzacoalcos
- Nickname: Los Delfines (The Dolphins)
- Founded: 1997; 29 years ago 2024; 2 years ago (refounded)
- Ground: Estadio Rafael Hernández Ochoa; Coatzacoalcos, Veracruz
- Capacity: 4,800
- Chairman: Rigoberto Carrasco
- Manager: Iván Liévano
- League: Liga Premier (Premier A)
- 2025–26: Liga TDP; Regular phase: 1st – Group III; Final phase: National champions (promoted)
Home colours	Away colours

Deportivo Delfines de Coatzacoalcos is a Mexican professional football club based in Coatzacoalcos, Veracruz. It competes in the Premier A, the intermediate branch of the Liga Premier de México, the third tier of Mexican football, and plays its home matches at the Estadio Rafael Hernández Ochoa.

== History ==
The team was founded in 1997 and they first appeared in Segunda División de México. They lasted six seasons until they were crowned champions in the Clausura 2003 and eventually won the final for promotion to the Primera División 'A' de México against Coras de Tepic. The team had good performances in the Segunda División, but in the Clausura 2004 they were relegated.

They achieved promotion again in 2005 after winning the final of the Segunda División de México against Pumas Naucalpan by a score of 5–4 on penalties. In regulation time, the match ended 4–4 in aggregate after the first match held in Coatzacoalcos, the Delfines won 2–1; while in the second match they lost 3–2 to Pumas Naucalpan.

Their history in the Primera División 'A' finished in 2006 when the franchise was sold and relocated to Villahermosa, Tabasco to make way for Guerreros de Tabasco.

In 2013, another team ended up setting up in the same area with the same name. Club de Fútbol Delfines Atlético Coatzacoalcos managed to win the Segunda División de México in 2014 and receive promotion to the newly formed Liga de Ascenso de México. Atlético Delfines de Coatzacoalcos managed to be promoted to the Liga de Ascenso after winning the final against Linces de Tlaxcala, but were unable meet the standards by the Federación Mexicana de Fútbol (FMF), so it was replaced by Coras de Tepic.

In 2024, the team was re-founded under the name Deportivo Delfines de Coatzacoalcos and was registered in the Tercera División de México, a league that represents the bottom level division of Mexican football.

In the 2025–26 season, the team was promoted to the Segunda División de México after reaching the zone finals in the Tercera División. In addition, the team won the Liga TDP champions trophy, proclaiming themselves the best team in the division in that season.

== Players ==
=== Current squad ===
As of 8 September 2026

Note: Flags indicate national team as defined under FIFA eligibility rules; some limited exceptions apply. Players may hold more than one non-FIFA nationality.

No.	Pos.	Nation	Player
1	GK	MEX	Alejandro Méndez
2	DF	MEX	Alessandro Méndez
3	DF	MEX	Alexis Espinosa
4	DF	MEX	Jorge Reynoso
5	MF	MEX	Brayan Flores
6	MF	MEX	José Guillén
7	MF	MEX	Sait Tlaxcalteco
8	MF	MEX	Hugo Rojas
9	FW	MEX	Alexander Espinosa
10	MF	MEX	Eliseo Toledo
11	MF	MEX	Hailton Hernández
12	GK	MEX	César Limón
13	DF	MEX	Roberto Quintero
14	DF	MEX	Emiliano Camarero
15	MF	MEX	Brian Torres

No.	Pos.	Nation	Player
16	MF	MEX	Alexander Pang
17	FW	MEX	Pablo Ramos
18	FW	MEX	Erick Meléndez
19	FW	MEX	Daniel Lara
20	MF	MEX	Esnaider Lara
21	MF	MEX	Fernando Álvarez
22	DF	MEX	Nicolás Aguilar
23	MF	MEX	Gibrán Sotero
24	DF	MEX	Freddy Arreola
25	GK	MEX	Gabriel del Ángel
26	DF	MEX	Joshua Ordaz
27	MF	MEX	Ángel Herrera
30	MF	MEX	Edson Castillo
33	MF	MEX	Keny Domínguez

=== Reserve teams ===
Delfines Universidad de Sotavento (Liga TDP)
Reserve team that plays in the Liga TDP, the fourth level of the Mexican league system

== Honours ==
=== National ===
==== Promotion divisions ====
- Segunda División
  - Champions (1): Clausura 2003
- Campeón de Campeones de la Segunda División
  - Champions (1): 2003
- Tercera División
  - Champions (1): 2025–26
- Liga TDP Zona A
  - Champions (1): 2025–26

== Reserves ==
=== Delfines "B" ===
The team participated in the Segunda División de México, finishing as champions in the Apertura 2005, defeating Pumas Naucalpan 5–4 on penalties. It also finished as runners-up in the Campeón de Campeones de la Segunda División 2006, losing to Pegaso Anáhuac 3–1.
