= Cruz Azul Lagunas =

Mexican football club, reserve team of Cruz Azul

- Full name: Club de Futbol Cruz Azul S.A. de C.V. Lagunas
- Nickname: La Maquinita (The Little Machine)
- Ground: Deportivo La Laguna; Lagunas, Oaxaca
- Capacity: 2,000
- Owner: Cooperativa La Cruz Azul
- President: Víctor Velázquez
- Head coach: Alexis López Aragón
- League: Liga Premier (Premier B)
- 2025–26: Liga TDP; Regular phase: 2nd – Group II; Final phase: Zone A runner–up (promoted)

Club de Futbol Cruz Azul S.A. de C.V. Lagunas, commonly referred to as Cruz Azul Lagunas, is a Mexican professional football club based in Lagunas, Oaxaca. The club competes in the Premier B, the bottom branch of the Liga Premier de México, the third tier of Mexican football. It serves as an affiliate team of Cruz Azul.

== History ==
In the 1940s, Cooperativa La Cruz Azul started to establish cities dedicated to its industry in the state of Oaxaca, one of which was located on the Isthmus of Tehuantepec and was called Lagunas. Football was one of the favorite sports for the development of the cities founded by the company.

Since the 1990s, the team has participated in the Tercera División de México, a category in which it has remained ever since. Between 2003 and 2006, there was a parallel project called Cruz Azul Oaxaca, which played in the Primera División 'A' de México after the relocation of Cruz Azul Hidalgo from the state of Hidalgo to the city of Oaxaca, which was nourished in part by players from the Lagunas team.

The team has trained some important players for the main team like Javier Aquino and Julio César Domínguez. Lagunas has also become a summer training venue for the first-team of Cruz Azul, where an annual stay is held.

In the 2025–26 season, the team reached the Tercera División zone finals, therefore, the team was promoted to the Segunda División de México, being the best performance in the club's history.

== Personnel ==
=== Coaching staff ===
Position	Staff
Manager	(Mexico) Alexis López Aragón
Assistant manager	(Mexico) Juan Bernal
Fitness coach	(Mexico) Jaiber Jiménez
Team doctor	(Mexico) Jose Alvarado

Source: Liga Premier

=== Management ===
Position	Staff
President	(Mexico) Víctor Velázquez
Administrative director	(Mexico) Antonio Reynoso
Director of football	(Uruguay) Iván Alonso

Source: Récord

== Players ==
=== Current squad ===
As of 30 August 2026

Note: Flags indicate national team as defined under FIFA eligibility rules; some limited exceptions apply. Players may hold more than one non-FIFA nationality.

No.	Pos.	Nation	Player
81	GK	MEX	Jesús Castillo
82	GK	MEX	Betuel Sánchez
83	GK	MEX	Ubelmar Luna
84	MF	MEX	Gilberto Cajita
85	MF	MEX	Ernesto Ascencio
86	MF	MEX	Juan Calderón
87	MF	MEX	Alex Yañez
88	DF	MEX	Andrés Velarde
89	FW	MEX	Jesús Nieto
90	DF	MEX	Carlos Ramos
91	MF	MEX	Erik Chantiri
92	MF	MEX	Agustin Garcia
93	MF	MEX	Brayan Moctezuma
94	DF	MEX	Jorge Nuncio
95	DF	MEX	Jorge Olivares
96	DF	MEX	Iván Ramírez
97	MF	MEX	Carlos Moreno

No.	Pos.	Nation	Player
98	FW	MEX	Yordi Toscano
99	FW	MEX	Nathan Williams
100	DF	MEX	Ramstein Callejas
101	DF	MEX	César Rojas
102	DF	MEX	Irvin Martinez
103	MF	MEX	Javier Cordova
104	MF	MEX	Pedro Cruz
105	MF	MEX	Ángel Pérez
106	DF	MEX	Francisco Medina
107	DF	MEX	Cristian Mijangos
108	MF	MEX	Daniel Estrada
109	DF	MEX	Aldo Puente
110	MF	MEX	Yazid Cruz
111	MF	MEX	Luis Cruz
112	MF	MEX	Marco Díaz
113	FW	MEX	Samuel Espinosa

Players listed in bold have made at least one senior first-team appearance.
