= Atlético Boca del Río =

- Full name: Atlético Boca del Río
- Nickname: Atleti
- Founded: 1988; 38 years ago
- Ground: Instituto Tecnológico de Veracruz; Veracruz City, Veracruz, Mexico
- Capacity: 1,000
- Chairman: Edgar Javier Cruz Hernández
- League: Liga TDP - Group III
- 2025–26: 13th – Group 3
Home colours	Away colours	Third colours

Atlético Boca del Río is a Mexican football club that currently plays in group 3 in the Liga TDP. The club is based in Boca del Río, Veracruz.

== History ==
The club was founded in 1988 as Club Deportivo Atlético Veracruz as an affiliate of Liga de Ascenso club Tiburones Rojos. In 1990 the club changed its name to Deportivo Atlético Boca del Río playing in the Tercera División de México managing to gain the Promotion to the Segunda División de México.

== See also ==
- Football in Mexico
