= La Tribu de Ciudad Juárez =

Mexican football club

- Full name: La Tribu de Ciudad Juárez Fútbol Club
- Nickname: La Tribu
- Founded: 2012; 14 years ago
- Ground: Estadio Municipal 8 de Diciembre; Ciudad Juárez, Chihuahua
- Capacity: 4,050
- Chairman: Javier Martínez
- Manager: Jorge Villa
- League: Liga Premier (Premier A)
- 2025–26: Liga TDP; Regular phase: 1st – Group XVII; Final phase: Zone B runner–up (promoted)
Home colours	Away colours	Third colours

La Tribu de Ciudad Juárez Fútbol Club is a Mexican football club based in Ciudad Juárez, Chihuahua that competes in the Premier A, the intermediate branch of the Liga Premier de México, the third level division of Mexican football.

== History ==
The team was founded in 2012 as a result of the name change of Club Colegio de Bachilleres de Ciudad Juárez and after the dissolution of Indios de Ciudad Juárez, club that was honored with the name La Tribu de Ciudad Juárez, it played its first official match on October 21 of the same year, drawing two goals against Chinarras de Aldama.

The club reached the final phase for promotion in the years 2013, 2014, 2016, 2019, 2021, 2022, 2023, 2024, 2025 and 2026.

In the 2025–26 season, La Tribu achieved promotion to the Liga Premier de México, after reaching the regional finals of the Liga TDP, marking the best performance in the club's history.

== Stadium ==
Since the 2026–27 season, La Tribu plays its matches at home at the Estadio Municipal 8 de Diciembre, which has a capacity to accommodate 4,050 spectators and it was opened in 2025.

Until 2026, the first team played its home matches in the Complejo Deportivo La Tribu, which has a capacity to accommodate 500 spectators. Since the 2026–27 season, this complex became the home ground for the club's reserve team.

== Players ==
=== First-team squad ===
As of 2 September 2026

Note: Flags indicate national team as defined under FIFA eligibility rules; some limited exceptions apply. Players may hold more than one non-FIFA nationality.

No.	Pos.	Nation	Player
1	GK	MEX	Moisés Muñóz
2	DF	MEX	Mario Muñoz
3	DF	MEX	Diego Moreno
4	DF	MEX	José Herrera
5	DF	MEX	Juan Solís
6	DF	MEX	Mario Zapata
7	FW	MEX	Aarón Colunga
8	MF	MEX	Calep González
9	FW	MEX	Bryan Grijalva
11	MF	MEX	Even Padilla
14	FW	MEX	Luis Mendoza
15	MF	MEX	Kevin Alvidrez
17	MF	MEX	Jesús Reyes

No.	Pos.	Nation	Player
18	MF	MEX	Jesús Díaz
20	MF	MEX	Jorge Ganem
21	GK	MEX	Joshua Medina
22	DF	MEX	Luis Luján
25	FW	MEX	Jesús Telles
26	MF	MEX	Bryan Calamaco
27	MF	MEX	Dylan Vargas
28	MF	MEX	Rigoberto Espinoza
29	FW	MEX	Octavio Díaz
31	GK	MEX	José Arano
33	MF	MEX	Gonzalo Tronco
34	FW	MEX	Gael de Lara

== Reserve ==
=== La Tribu de Ciudad Juárez TDP ===
Reserve team that plays in the Liga TDP, the fourth level of Mexican football.
