= Caballeros de Córdoba =

Mexican football club

- Full name: Caballeros de Córdoba
- Ground: Estadio Rafael Murillo
- Capacity: 3,800
- Chairman: Benito Garcia Sánchez
- Manager: René Olmos
- League: Tercera División de México
Home colours	Away colours

Caballeros de Córdoba is a Mexican football club that plays in the Tercera División de México. The club is based in Córdoba, Veracruz.

== History ==
The franchise was founded during the 1990, from its origins it was registered in the Tercera División. In 2008 the club lent its franchise to a company formed by the Casino Español de Córdoba and Santos Laguna, a Liga MX team, with the aim of establishing a Santos Laguna reserve team in Córdoba, the team was called Santos Casino. In 2011 this team reached the final of the Tercera División, where they were defeated by Vaqueros de Ixtlán. In 2013 the team was renamed Santos Córdoba because Casino Español abandoned the alliance with Santos Laguna, so the team began to be managed from Torreón, in 2014 this team was dissolved.

Starting in 2015, a series of franchise changes began based on the Caballeros de Córdoba license. Between 2014 and 2016 the license was used by Langostineros de Atoyac, later between 2016 and 2017 it was used by Potros Paso del Macho, in 2018 it was used by Bravos de Coscomatepec and between 2019 and 2020 by Fuertes de Fortín F.C., however, during this time the teams continued with the Santos Córdoba identity.

In 2021 the team was reestablished as Caballeros de Córdoba.

== See also ==
- Tercera División de México
