= Estadio Miguel Castro Servín =

Multi-use stadium in Hermosillo, Sonora, Mexico

Coordinates: 29°4′53″N 110°57′52″W

The Estadio Miguel Castro Servín is a multi-use stadium in Hermosillo, Sonora. It is currently used mostly for football matches and is the home stadium for Cimarrones de Sonora Premier The stadium has a capacity of 4,000 people.
