= 2022–23 Liga TDP season =

Liga TDP
- Season: 2022–23
- Dates: 18 August 2022 – 27 May 2023
- Champions: Aguacateros de Peribán (1st title)
- Matches: 2,816
- Goals: 8,956 (3.18 per match)
- Top goalscorer: Edson Cibrián (40 goals)
- Stats are from the regular season only

The 2022–23 Liga TDP season is the fourth-tier football league of Mexico. The tournament began on 18 August 2022 and finished on 27 May 2023.

== Competition format ==
The Tercera División (Third Division) is divided into 18 groups. For the 2009–2010 season, the format of the tournament has been reorganized to a home and away format, which all teams will play in their respective group. The 18 groups consist of teams which are eligible to play in the liguilla de ascenso (promotion play–offs) for four promotion spots, teams who are affiliated with teams in the Liga MX, Liga de Expansión MX and Liga Premier and development teams, which are not eligible for promotion but will play that who the better team in a sixteen team reserves playoff tournament for the entire season.

The regulation awards three points for a win, one point for a tie and zero points for a loss, however, when a match ends tied, a penalty shoot-out is played to award a bonus point to the winning team of the penalty series.

The league format allows participating franchises to rent their place to another team, so some clubs compete with a different name than the one registered with the FMF.

For the 2022–23 season there will be four promotions to the Liga Premier. Two to Serie A and two to Serie B.

== Group 1 ==
Group with 13 teams from Campeche, Chiapas Quintana Roo and Yucatán.

Location of teams in the 2022–23 Liga TDP Group 1 (Campeche)
Location of teams in the 2022–23 Liga TDP Group 1 (Quintana Roo)
Location of teams in the 2022–23 Liga TDP Group 1 (Chiapas)
Location of teams in the 2022–23 Liga TDP Group 1 (Yucatán)

=== Teams ===
| Team | City | Home ground | Capacity | Affiliate | Official Name |
|---|---|---|---|---|---|
| Campeche | Campeche, Campeche | La Muralla de Kin-Ha | 500 | — | — |
| Cantera Venados | Mérida, Yucatán | Carlos Iturralde | 15,087 | Venados | — |
| Chetumal | Chetumal, Quintana Roo | José López Portillo | 6,600 | – | – |
| Corsarios de Campeche | Campeche, Campeche | Universitario de Campeche | 4,000 | — | — |
| Deportiva Venados | Tamanché, Yucatán | Alonso Diego Molina | 2,500 | Deportiva Venados | — |
| Felinos 48 | Reforma, Chiapas | Cancha Unidad y Compromiso | 600 | – | – |
| Inter Playa del Carmen | Playa del Carmen, Quintana Roo | Unidad Deportiva Mario Villanueva Madrid | 7,500 | Inter Playa del Carmen | — |
| Mayas | Hunucmá, Yucatán | Unidad Deportiva Solidaridad | 1,000 | — | — |
| Mons Calpe Yucatán | Motul, Yucatán | Unidad Deportiva Felipe Carrillo Puerto | 1,000 | Mons Calpe | – |
| Pampaneros de Champotón | Champotón, Campeche | Nou Camp Champotón | 1,000 | – | – |
| Pioneros Junior | Cancún, Quintana Roo | Cancún 86 | 6,390 | Cancún | — |
| Progreso | Progreso, Yucatán | 20 de Noviembre | 3,000 | Venados | — |
| Saraguatos de Palenque | Palenque, Chiapas | Rey Pakal | 1,000 | – | – |

=== League table ===
| Pos | Team | Pld | W | D | L | GF | GA | GD | BP | Pts | Qualification or relegation |
|---|---|---|---|---|---|---|---|---|---|---|---|
| 1 | Deportiva Venados | 24 | 16 | 6 | 2 | 50 | 12 | +38 | 3 | 57 | Advance to Liguilla de Ascenso |
| 2 | Inter Playa del Carmen | 24 | 14 | 7 | 3 | 50 | 20 | +30 | 3 | 52 | Advance to Liguilla de Ascenso |
| 3 | Pioneros Junior | 24 | 13 | 7 | 4 | 43 | 23 | +20 | 5 | 51 | Advance to Liguilla de Ascenso |
| 4 | Progreso | 24 | 12 | 8 | 4 | 40 | 20 | +20 | 6 | 50 | Advance to Liguilla de Ascenso |
| 5 | Mons Calpe Yucatán | 24 | 9 | 12 | 3 | 32 | 18 | +14 | 8 | 47 | |
| 6 | Campeche | 24 | 11 | 7 | 6 | 45 | 29 | +16 | 3 | 43 | |
| 7 | Pampaneros de Champotón | 24 | 8 | 7 | 9 | 31 | 32 | −1 | 2 | 33 | |
| 8 | Felinos 48 | 24 | 7 | 8 | 9 | 31 | 30 | +1 | 3 | 32 | |
| 9 | Chetumal | 24 | 7 | 7 | 10 | 31 | 36 | −5 | 1 | 29 | |
| 10 | Corsarios de Campeche | 24 | 6 | 6 | 12 | 24 | 36 | −12 | 1 | 25 | |
| 11 | Cantera Venados | 24 | 3 | 7 | 14 | 28 | 49 | −21 | 6 | 22 | |
| 12 | Saraguatos de Palenque | 24 | 4 | 3 | 17 | 26 | 65 | −39 | 2 | 17 | |
| 13 | Mayas | 24 | 3 | 1 | 20 | 11 | 72 | −61 | 0 | 10 | |

Updated to match(es) played on 15 April 2023. Source: Liga TDP

== Group 2 ==
Group with 11 teams from Chiapas and Oaxaca.

=== Teams ===
Location of teams in the 2022–23 Liga TDP Group 2 (Chiapas)
Location of teams in the 2022–23 Liga TDP Group 2 (Oaxaca)

| Team | City | Home ground | Capacity | Affiliate | Official name |
|---|---|---|---|---|---|
| Antequera | San Pablo Etla, Oaxaca | Unidad Deportiva San Pablo Etla | 1,000 | – | – |
| Atlético Ixtepec | Juchitán, Oaxaca | El Juchiteco | 1,000 | — | – |
| Búhos de Oaxaca | Oaxaca City, Oaxaca | Deportivo Ramos | 1,000 | – | – |
| CEFOR Chiapas | Tuxtla Gutiérrez, Chiapas | Flor de Sospo | 3,000 | – | – |
| Cruz Azul Lagunas | Lagunas, Oaxaca | Cruz Azul | 2,000 | Cruz Azul | – |
| Dragones de Oaxaca | Zimatlán de Álvarez, Oaxaca | Unidad Deportiva Ignacio Mejía | 1,000 | – | – |
| Garra Fraylesca | Villaflores, Chiapas | Lic. Miguel Tamayo Guzmán | 1,000 | – | Toros Huatusco |
| Lechuzas UPGCH | Tuxtla Gutiérrez, Chiapas | Flor de Sospo | 3,000 | – | – |
| Milenarios de Oaxaca | San Pablo Villa de Mitla, Oaxaca | Municipal San Pablo Villa de Mitla | 1,000 | – | – |
| Profutsoccer | San Cristóbal de las Casas, Chiapas | Municipal de San Cristóbal de las Casas | 4,000 | – | – |
| Universidad del Sureste | Comitán de Domínguez, Chiapas | Centro de Formación UDS | 500 | — | — |

=== League table ===
| Pos | Team | Pld | W | D | L | GF | GA | GD | BP | Pts | Qualification or relegation |
|---|---|---|---|---|---|---|---|---|---|---|---|
| 1 | Búhos de Oaxaca | 20 | 12 | 5 | 3 | 33 | 20 | +13 | 4 | 45 | Advance to Liguilla de Ascenso |
| 2 | Dragones de Oaxaca | 20 | 12 | 5 | 3 | 51 | 20 | +31 | 3 | 44 | Advance to Liguilla de Ascenso |
| 3 | Cruz Azul Lagunas | 20 | 9 | 7 | 4 | 28 | 19 | +9 | 6 | 40 | Advance to Liguilla de Ascenso |
| 4 | Profutsoccer | 20 | 8 | 8 | 4 | 25 | 18 | +7 | 4 | 36 | |
| 5 | Universidad del Sureste | 20 | 9 | 5 | 6 | 38 | 24 | +14 | 3 | 35 | |
| 6 | Lechuzas UPGCH | 20 | 10 | 4 | 6 | 43 | 24 | +19 | 0 | 34 | |
| 7 | Garra Fraylesca | 20 | 5 | 9 | 6 | 26 | 28 | −2 | 4 | 28 | |
| 8 | Atlético Ixtepec | 20 | 5 | 6 | 9 | 29 | 38 | −9 | 3 | 24 | |
| 9 | CEFOR Chiapas | 20 | 6 | 3 | 11 | 26 | 40 | −14 | 1 | 22 | |
| 10 | Antequera | 20 | 3 | 2 | 15 | 16 | 42 | −26 | 1 | 12 | |
| 11 | Milenarios de Oaxaca | 20 | 2 | 4 | 14 | 15 | 57 | −42 | 0 | 10 | |

Updated to match(es) played on 15 April 2023. Source: Liga TDP

== Group 3 ==
Group with 13 teams from Puebla and Veracruz.

=== Teams ===
Location of teams in the 2022–23 Liga TDP Group 3 (Puebla)
Location of teams in the 2022–23 Liga TDP Group 3 (Oaxaca and Veracruz)

| Team | City | Home ground | Capacity | Affiliate | Official Name |
|---|---|---|---|---|---|
| Académicos UGM | Orizaba, Veracruz | Universitario UGM | 1,500 | — | — |
| Atlante Xalapa | Xalapa Enríquez, Veracruz | Escuela de Fútbol Élix | 500 | Atlante | – |
| Caballeros de Córdoba | Córdoba, Veracruz | Rafael Murillo Vidal | 3,800 | — | — |
| Conejos de Tuxtepec | Tuxtepec, Oaxaca | Ing. Guillermo Hernández Castro | 1,500 | — | — |
| Córdoba | Córdoba, Veracruz | Rafael Murillo Vidal | 3,800 | — | Deportivo Albiazul |
| Delfines UGM | Nogales, Veracruz | UGM Nogales | 1,500 | — | — |
| Diablos Blancos | Puebla, Puebla | Complejo Los Olivos | 1,000 | – | Unión Magdalena Contreras |
| Guerreros de Puebla | Puebla, Puebla | Unidad Deportiva Mario Vázquez Raña | 800 | – | – |
| Licántropos | Puebla, Puebla | Campos El Cóndor | 500 | — | — |
| Lobos Puebla | Puebla, Puebla | Universitario BUAP | 19,283 | — | — |
| Los Ángeles | Puebla, Puebla | Unidad Deportiva Mario Vázquez Raña | 800 | — | — |
| Reales de Puebla | Chachapa, Puebla | Unidad Deportiva Chachapa | 1,000 | — | — |
| Tehuacán | Tehuacán, Puebla | Polideportivo La Huizachera | 1,000 | — | — |

=== League table ===
| Pos | Team | Pld | W | D | L | GF | GA | GD | BP | Pts | Qualification or relegation |
|---|---|---|---|---|---|---|---|---|---|---|---|
| 1 | Caballeros de Córdoba | 24 | 17 | 4 | 3 | 51 | 18 | +33 | 2 | 57 | Advance to Liguilla de Ascenso |
| 2 | Delfines UGM | 24 | 16 | 5 | 3 | 60 | 19 | +41 | 4 | 57 | Advance to Liguilla de Ascenso |
| 3 | Académicos UGM | 24 | 12 | 6 | 6 | 46 | 25 | +21 | 4 | 46 | Advance to Liguilla de Ascenso |
| 4 | Licántropos | 24 | 10 | 10 | 4 | 55 | 31 | +24 | 4 | 44 | |
| 5 | Diablos Blancos | 24 | 10 | 8 | 6 | 44 | 27 | +17 | 4 | 42 | |
| 6 | Córdoba | 24 | 12 | 4 | 8 | 42 | 27 | +15 | 2 | 42 | |
| 7 | Tehuacán | 24 | 11 | 6 | 7 | 47 | 33 | +14 | 2 | 41 | |
| 8 | Atlante Xalapa | 24 | 9 | 6 | 9 | 29 | 28 | +1 | 5 | 38 | Advance to Liguilla de No Ascenso |
| 9 | Conejos de Tuxtepec | 24 | 9 | 4 | 11 | 34 | 41 | −7 | 0 | 31 | |
| 10 | Los Ángeles | 24 | 6 | 7 | 11 | 27 | 33 | −6 | 3 | 28 | |
| 11 | Reales de Puebla | 24 | 4 | 6 | 14 | 15 | 50 | −35 | 3 | 21 | |
| 12 | Lobos Puebla | 24 | 3 | 5 | 16 | 22 | 61 | −39 | 2 | 16 | |
| 13 | Guerreros Puebla | 24 | 0 | 3 | 21 | 15 | 94 | −79 | 2 | 5 | |

Updated to match(es) played on 15 April 2023. Source: Liga TDP

== Group 4 ==
Group with 16 teams from Greater Mexico City.

=== Teams ===
Location of teams in the 2022–23 Liga TDP Group 4

| Team | City | Home ground | Capacity | Affiliate | Official name |
|---|---|---|---|---|---|
| Álamos | Iztacalco, Mexico City | Magdalena Mixhuca Sports City Ground 1 | 500 | Guadalajara | – |
| América Coyoacán | Venustiano Carranza, Mexico City | Deportivo Francisco Zarco | 1,000 | América | Valle de Xico F.C. |
| Aragón | Venustiano Carranza, Mexico City | Deportivo Francisco Zarco | 1,000 | Pachuca | Atlético San Juan de Aragón |
| Atlético Mexicano | Venustiano Carranza, Mexico City | Deportivo Eduardo Molina | 500 | – | – |
| Aztecas AMF Soccer | Venustiano Carranza, Mexico City | Deportivo Francisco Zarco | 1,000 | – | – |
| Cefor Mario Gálvez | Venustiano Carranza, Mexico City | Deportivo Plutarco Elías Calles | 300 | – | Marina |
| Chilangos | Benito Juárez, Mexico City | Deportivo Benito Juárez | 1,000 | – | – |
| Coyotes | Coyoacán, Mexico City | Parque Huayamilpas | 1,000 | Escorpiones | Escorpiones |
| Cuervos Blancos | Cuautitlán, State of Mexico | Los Pinos | 5,000 | – | – |
| Domínguez Osos | Gustavo A. Madero, Mexico City | Deportivo Miguel Alemán | 500 | – | – |
| Halcones de Rayón | Iztacalco, Mexico City | Magdalena Mixhuca Sports City Ground 1 | 500 | – | – |
| Lobos UTD Ehécatl | Venustiano Carranza, Mexico City | Deportivo Plutarco Elías Calles | 300 | – | Promodep Central |
| Muxes | Iztacalco, Mexico City | Jesús Martínez "Palillo" | 6,000 | – | – |
| Novillos Neza | Iztacalco, Mexico City | Magdalena Mixhuca Sports City Ground 1 | 500 | – | – |
| Oceanía | Venustiano Carranza, Mexico City | Deportivo Oceanía | 1,000 | – | – |
| Politécnico | Venustiano Carranza, Mexico City | Deportivo Leandro Valle | 1,000 | – | – |

=== League table ===
| Pos | Team | Pld | W | D | L | GF | GA | GD | BP | Pts | Qualification or relegation |
|---|---|---|---|---|---|---|---|---|---|---|---|
| 1 | Aragón | 30 | 26 | 2 | 2 | 91 | 11 | +80 | 1 | 81 | Advance to Liguilla de Ascenso |
| 2 | Muxes | 30 | 26 | 2 | 2 | 87 | 14 | +73 | 0 | 80 | Advance to Liguilla de Ascenso |
| 3 | Chilangos | 30 | 20 | 7 | 3 | 76 | 31 | +45 | 4 | 71 | Advance to Liguilla de Ascenso |
| 4 | Atlético Mexicano | 30 | 18 | 4 | 8 | 65 | 29 | +36 | 3 | 61 | Advance to Liguilla de Ascenso |
| 5 | Cuervos Blancos | 30 | 19 | 2 | 9 | 69 | 41 | +28 | 0 | 59 | Advance to Liguilla de Ascenso |
| 6 | Oceanía | 30 | 14 | 7 | 9 | 38 | 32 | +6 | 4 | 53 | Advance to Liguilla de Ascenso |
| 7 | Álamos | 30 | 13 | 8 | 9 | 53 | 36 | +17 | 1 | 48 | |
| 8 | Politécnico | 30 | 12 | 5 | 13 | 42 | 42 | 0 | 4 | 45 | |
| 9 | América Coyoacán | 30 | 11 | 5 | 14 | 37 | 42 | −5 | 4 | 42 | |
| 10 | Domínguez Osos | 30 | 11 | 5 | 14 | 40 | 47 | −7 | 3 | 41 | |
| 11 | Halcones de Rayón | 30 | 9 | 6 | 15 | 31 | 47 | −16 | 3 | 36 | |
| 12 | Aztecas AMF Soccer | 30 | 7 | 4 | 19 | 28 | 66 | −38 | 2 | 27 | |
| 13 | Novillos Neza | 30 | 5 | 7 | 18 | 29 | 74 | −45 | 3 | 25 | |
| 14 | Cefor Mario Gálvez | 30 | 5 | 4 | 21 | 24 | 69 | −45 | 2 | 21 | |
| 15 | Coyotes | 30 | 3 | 6 | 21 | 20 | 76 | −56 | 2 | 17 | |
| 16 | Lobos UTD Ehécatl | 30 | 2 | 4 | 24 | 15 | 88 | −73 | 3 | 13 | |

Updated to match(es) played on 15 April 2023. Source: Liga TDP

== Group 5 ==
Group with 16 teams from Greater Mexico City.

=== Teams ===
Location of teams in the 2022–23 Liga TDP Group 5
Location of teams in the 2022–23 Liga TDP Group 5 (Rural Greater Mexico City)

| Team | City | Home ground | Capacity | Affiliate | Official name |
|---|---|---|---|---|---|
| Academia América Leyendas | Iztapalapa, Mexico City | Deportivo Leandro Valle | 1,000 | – | San José del Arenal |
| Academia Mineros CDMX | Iztacalco, Mexico City | Magdalena Mixhuca Sports City Ground 1 | 500 | – | CH Fútbol Club |
| Cañoneros | Milpa Alta, Mexico City | Deportivo Plutarco Elías Calles | 300 | Cañoneros | – |
| CARSAF | Venustiano Carranza, Mexico City | Deportivo Lázaro Cárdenas | 1,000 | – | Azucareros de Tezonapa |
| Cefor Cuauhtémoc Blanco | Gustavo A. Madero, Mexico City | Deportivo Los Galeana | 1,500 | – | – |
| CDM | Venustiano Carranza, Mexico City | Deportivo Plutarco Elías Calles | 300 | – | – |
| Cordobés | Huixquilucan de Degollado, State of Mexico | Alberto Pérez Navarro | 3,000 | – | – |
| Dongu | Cuautitlán, State of Mexico | Los Pinos | 5,000 | Dongu | – |
| Ecatepec | Ecatepec de Morelos, State of Mexico | Guadalupe Victoria | 1,000 | – | – |
| Guerreros DDios | Xochimilco, Mexico City | San Isidro | 1,200 | – | – |
| Héroes de Zaci | Xochimilco, Mexico City | San Isidro | 1,200 | – | – |
| Independiente Mexiquense | Huehuetoca, State of Mexico | 12 de Mayo | 1,500 | – | – |
| Morelos | Tequixquiac, State of Mexico | Deportivo Adolfo López Mateos | 1,000 | – | – |
| Olimpo | Milpa Alta, Mexico City | Momoxco | 3,500 | – | Colegio Once México |
| Sangre de Campeón | Tultitlán, State of Mexico | Cancha Nou Camp | 1,000 | – | – |
| Unión | Melchor Ocampo, State of Mexico | Deportivo Melchor Ocampo | 1,000 | – | – |

=== League table ===
| Pos | Team | Pld | W | D | L | GF | GA | GD | BP | Pts | Qualification or relegation |
|---|---|---|---|---|---|---|---|---|---|---|---|
| 1 | CDM | 30 | 28 | 1 | 1 | 149 | 19 | +130 | 1 | 86 | Advance to Liguilla de Ascenso |
| 2 | Academia Mineros CDMX | 30 | 18 | 7 | 5 | 69 | 38 | +31 | 4 | 65 | Advance to Liguilla de Ascenso |
| 3 | Héroes de Zaci | 30 | 17 | 7 | 6 | 69 | 36 | +33 | 3 | 61 | Advance to Liguilla de Ascenso |
| 4 | Guerreros DDios | 30 | 15 | 9 | 6 | 54 | 23 | +31 | 7 | 61 | Advance to Liguilla de Ascenso |
| 5 | Cordobés | 30 | 18 | 4 | 8 | 56 | 43 | +13 | 2 | 60 | Advance to Liguilla de Ascenso |
| 6 | Unión | 30 | 18 | 3 | 9 | 68 | 36 | +32 | 2 | 59 | |
| 7 | Dongu | 30 | 18 | 3 | 9 | 56 | 40 | +16 | 0 | 57 | Advance to Liguilla de No Ascenso |
| 8 | Independiente Mexiquense | 30 | 13 | 4 | 13 | 60 | 65 | −5 | 3 | 46 | |
| 9 | Academia América Leyendas | 30 | 10 | 5 | 15 | 42 | 52 | −10 | 2 | 37 | |
| 10 | Sangre de Campeón | 30 | 7 | 9 | 14 | 39 | 51 | −12 | 6 | 36 | |
| 11 | CARSAF | 30 | 9 | 5 | 16 | 48 | 59 | −11 | 2 | 34 | |
| 12 | Cañoneros | 30 | 9 | 5 | 16 | 40 | 56 | −16 | 2 | 34 | |
| 13 | Ecatepec | 30 | 10 | 3 | 17 | 40 | 62 | −22 | 0 | 33 | |
| 14 | Cefor Cuauhtémoc Blanco | 30 | 8 | 2 | 20 | 33 | 67 | −34 | 0 | 26 | |
| 15 | Olimpo | 30 | 6 | 1 | 23 | 28 | 67 | −39 | 0 | 19 | |
| 16 | Morelos | 30 | 2 | 0 | 28 | 18 | 155 | −137 | 0 | 6 | |

Updated to match(es) played on 15 April 2023. Source: Liga TDP

== Group 6 ==
Group with 16 teams from Hidalgo, Michoacán and State of Mexico.

Location of teams in the 2022–23 Liga TDP Group 6

=== Teams ===
| Team | City | Home ground | Capacity | Affiliate | Official name |
|---|---|---|---|---|---|
| Águilas de Teotihuacán | Teotihuacán, State of Mexico | Deportivo Braulio Romero | 1,000 | – | – |
| Alebrijes Teotihuacán | Teotihuacán, State of Mexico | Municipal de Teotihuacán | 1,200 | Alebrijes de Oaxaca | – |
| Artesanos Metepec | Metepec, State of Mexico | La Hortaliza | 500 | – | – |
| Atlante Chalco | Chalco, State of Mexico | Arreola | 3,217 | Atlante | – |
| Ciervos | Chalco, State of Mexico | Arreola | 3,217 | Ciervos | – |
| Estudiantes | Atlacomulco, State of Mexico | Municipal de Atlacomulco | 2,000 | – | – |
| Eurosoccer | San Mateo Atenco, State of Mexico | Municipal San Mateo Atenco | 2,500 | – | Deportivo Metepec |
| FORMAFUTINTEGRAL | Ixtapaluca, State of Mexico | Campo La Era | 1,000 | – | – |
| Leones Huixquilucan | Huixquilucan de Degollado, State of Mexico | Alberto Pérez Navarro | 3,000 | – | – |
| Orishas Tepeji | Tepeji, Hidalgo | Tepeji | 2,000 | – | – |
| Panteras Neza | Ciudad Nezahualcóyotl, State of Mexico | San Marcos | 1,000 | – | – |
| Proyecto México Soccer | Santa María Rayón, State of Mexico | Unidad Deportiva Dionicio Cerón | 1,000 | – | Grupo Sherwood |
| Real San Luis | Xonacatlán, State of Mexico | Gustavo A. Vicencio | 1,500 | – | Originales Aguacateros |
| Tenancingo | Tenancingo, State of Mexico | JM "Grillo" Cruzalta | 3,000 | – | Fuerza Mazahua |
| Toluca | Metepec, State of Mexico | Instalaciones de Metepec | 1,000 | Toluca | – |
| Zitácuaro | Zitácuaro, Michoacán | Ignacio López Rayón | 10,000 | Zitácuaro | – |

=== League table ===
| Pos | Team | Pld | W | D | L | GF | GA | GD | BP | Pts | Qualification or relegation |
|---|---|---|---|---|---|---|---|---|---|---|---|
| 1 | Artesanos Metepec | 30 | 26 | 3 | 1 | 98 | 16 | +82 | 2 | 83 | Advance to Liguilla de Ascenso |
| 2 | Toluca | 30 | 24 | 3 | 3 | 93 | 23 | +70 | 1 | 76 | Advance to Liguilla de No Ascenso |
| 3 | Estudiantes | 30 | 19 | 6 | 5 | 51 | 19 | +32 | 4 | 67 | Advance to Liguilla de Ascenso |
| 4 | Tenancingo | 30 | 15 | 8 | 7 | 45 | 28 | +17 | 3 | 56 | Advance to Liguilla de Ascenso |
| 5 | Alebrijes Teotihuacán | 30 | 13 | 9 | 8 | 47 | 30 | +17 | 4 | 52 | Advance to Liguilla de No Ascenso |
| 6 | Real San Luis | 30 | 11 | 13 | 6 | 38 | 29 | +9 | 5 | 51 | |
| 7 | Orishas Tepeji | 30 | 12 | 6 | 12 | 52 | 49 | +3 | 4 | 46 | |
| 8 | Zitácuaro | 30 | 13 | 4 | 13 | 50 | 44 | +6 | 2 | 45 | |
| 9 | Leones Huixquilucan | 30 | 11 | 4 | 15 | 42 | 53 | −11 | 3 | 40 | |
| 10 | Proyecto México Soccer | 30 | 10 | 6 | 14 | 35 | 49 | −14 | 3 | 39 | |
| 11 | Atlante Chalco | 30 | 8 | 6 | 16 | 44 | 56 | −12 | 3 | 33 | |
| 12 | FORMAFUTINTEGRAL | 30 | 9 | 3 | 18 | 31 | 57 | −26 | 3 | 33 | |
| 13 | Ciervos | 30 | 8 | 5 | 17 | 29 | 53 | −24 | 1 | 30 | |
| 14 | Panteras Neza | 30 | 7 | 6 | 17 | 27 | 69 | −42 | 3 | 30 | |
| 15 | Eurosoccer | 30 | 5 | 4 | 21 | 24 | 76 | −52 | 4 | 23 | |
| 16 | Águilas de Teotihuacán | 30 | 4 | 4 | 22 | 29 | 84 | −55 | 0 | 16 | |

Updated to match(es) played on 15 April 2023. Source: Liga TDP

== Group 7 ==
Group with 14 teams from Guerrero, Mexico City and Morelos.

=== Teams ===
Location of teams in the 2021–22 Liga TDP Group 7 (Mexico City)
Location of teams in the 2022–23 Liga TDP Group 7 (Morelos)
Location of teams in the 2021–22 Liga TDP Group 7 (Guerrero)

| Team | City | Home ground | Capacity | Affiliate | Official name |
|---|---|---|---|---|---|
| Academia Cuextlán | Xochimilco, Mexico City | Deportivo Leandro Valle | 1,000 | Juárez | – |
| Águilas UAGro | Acapulco, Guerrero | Unidad Deportiva Acapulco | 13,000 | – | – |
| Arroceros Jojutla | Jojutla, Morelos | Unidad Deportiva La Perseverancia | 1,000 | – | Académicos Jojutla |
| Atlético Real del Puente | Xochitepec, Morelos | Ejido Real del Puente | 1,000 | – | Santiago Tulantepec |
| Caudillos Zapata | Emiliano Zapata, Morelos | General Emiliano Zapata | 2,000 | – | Caudillos de Morelos |
| CILESI | Xochimilco, Mexico City | San Isidro | 1,200 | – | – |
| Iguala | Iguala, Guerrero | Unidad Deportiva Iguala | 4,000 | – | – |
| Iguanas | Zihuatanejo, Guerrero | Unidad Deportiva Zihuatanejo | 1,000 | – | – |
| Juárez | Xochimilco, Mexico City | Momoxco | 3,500 | Juárez | – |
| Oaxtepec | Oaxtepec, Morelos | Olímpico Centro Vacacional IMSS | 9,000 | – | Pejelagartos de Tabasco |
| Selva Cañera | Tlaquiltenango, Morelos | Unidad Deportiva Roberto "Monito" Rodríguez | 1,000 | – | – |
| Tigres Yautepec | Yautepec, Morelos | Centro Deportivo Yautepec | 3,000 | – | Atlético Cuernavaca |
| Tlapa | Tlapa de Comonfort, Guerrero | Cancha Los Rivera | 1,000 | – | – |
| Yautepec | Yautepec, Morelos | Centro Deportivo Yautepec | 3,000 | – | – |

=== League table ===
| Pos | Team | Pld | W | D | L | GF | GA | GD | BP | Pts | Qualification or relegation |
|---|---|---|---|---|---|---|---|---|---|---|---|
| 1 | Tigres Yautepec | 26 | 19 | 5 | 2 | 76 | 25 | +51 | 3 | 65 | Advance to Liguilla de Ascenso |
| 2 | Águilas UAGro | 26 | 19 | 6 | 1 | 67 | 20 | +47 | 2 | 65 | Advance to Liguilla de Ascenso |
| 3 | Yautepec | 26 | 17 | 5 | 4 | 63 | 25 | +38 | 2 | 58 | Advance to Liguilla de Ascenso |
| 4 | Juárez | 26 | 14 | 5 | 7 | 54 | 28 | +26 | 4 | 51 | Advance to Liguilla de No Ascenso |
| 5 | Oaxtepec | 26 | 15 | 3 | 8 | 56 | 23 | +33 | 2 | 50 | Advance to Liguilla de Ascenso |
| 6 | Caudillos Zapata | 26 | 12 | 9 | 5 | 53 | 21 | +32 | 4 | 49 | |
| 7 | Arroceros Jojutla | 26 | 10 | 5 | 11 | 53 | 42 | +11 | 3 | 38 | |
| 8 | Selva Cañera | 26 | 10 | 6 | 10 | 45 | 45 | 0 | 2 | 38 | |
| 9 | Iguanas | 26 | 9 | 4 | 13 | 31 | 48 | −17 | 2 | 33 | |
| 10 | Atlético Real del Puente | 26 | 7 | 4 | 15 | 37 | 46 | −9 | 3 | 28 | |
| 11 | Iguala | 26 | 6 | 4 | 16 | 34 | 57 | −23 | 3 | 25 | |
| 12 | Academia Cuextlán | 26 | 5 | 4 | 17 | 23 | 72 | −49 | 2 | 21 | |
| 13 | CILESI | 26 | 3 | 5 | 18 | 22 | 76 | −54 | 4 | 18 | |
| 14 | Tlapa | 26 | 1 | 5 | 20 | 15 | 101 | −86 | 0 | 8 | |

Updated to match(es) played on 15 April 2023. Source: Liga TDP

== Group 8 ==
Group with 16 teams from Hidalgo and State of Mexico.

=== Teams ===
Location of teams in the 2022–23 Liga TDP Group 8 (Hidalgo and Puebla)
Location of teams in the 2022–23 Liga TDP Group 8 (State of Mexico)

| Team | City | Home ground | Capacity | Affiliate | Official name |
|---|---|---|---|---|---|
| Atlético Pachuca | Pachuca, Hidalgo | Revolución Mexicana | 3,500 | – | – |
| Atlético Toltecas | Tula, Hidalgo | Parque Infantil La Tortuga | 1,000 | – | Texcoco |
| Atlético Tulancingo | Tulancingo, Hidalgo | Primero de Mayo | 2,500 | – | – |
| Bombarderos de Tecámac | Tecámac, State of Mexico | Deportivo Sierra Hermosa | 1,000 | – | – |
| CEFOR "Chaco" Giménez | Tulancingo, Hidalgo | Unidad Deportiva Javier Rojo Gómez | 2,000 | – | – |
| Faraones de Texcoco | Texcoco, State of Mexico | Claudio Suárez | 4,000 | – | – |
| Guerreros de la Plata | Mineral de la Reforma, Hidalgo | Horacio Baños | 1,000 | – | – |
| Halcones Negros | Chicoloapan de Juárez, State of Mexico | San Borja Soccer Field | 1,000 | – | – |
| Halcones Zúñiga | Texcoco, State of Mexico | Unidad Deportiva Silverio Pérez | 1,000 | – | – |
| Hidalguense | Pachuca, Hidalgo | Club Hidalguense | 600 | – | – |
| Matamoros | Papalotla, State of Mexico | IMCUFIDE Papalotla | 1,000 | – | – |
| Pachuca | San Agustín Tlaxiaca, Hidalgo | Universidad del Fútbol | 1,000 | Pachuca | – |
| Sk Sport | Tulancingo, Hidalgo | Primero de Mayo | 2,500 | – | – |
| C.D. Tulancingo | Tulancingo, Hidalgo | Primero de Mayo | 2,500 | C.D. Tulancingo | – |
| Tuzos Pachuca | San Agustín Tlaxiaca, Hidalgo | Universidad del Fútbol | 1,000 | Pachuca | – |
| Unión Astros | Chiautla, State of Mexico | Deportivo Bravos | 1,000 | – | Histeria |

=== League table ===
| Pos | Team | Pld | W | D | L | GF | GA | GD | BP | Pts | Qualification or relegation |
|---|---|---|---|---|---|---|---|---|---|---|---|
| 1 | Halcones Negros | 30 | 18 | 9 | 3 | 95 | 37 | +58 | 5 | 68 | Advance to Liguilla de Ascenso |
| 2 | Faraones de Texcoco | 30 | 18 | 6 | 6 | 85 | 32 | +53 | 2 | 62 | Advance to Liguilla de Ascenso |
| 3 | Pachuca | 30 | 19 | 4 | 7 | 70 | 36 | +34 | 0 | 61 | Advance to Liguilla de No Ascenso |
| 4 | Hidalguense | 30 | 16 | 7 | 7 | 62 | 28 | +34 | 4 | 59 | Advance to Liguilla de Ascenso |
| 5 | Bombarderos de Tecámac | 30 | 15 | 9 | 6 | 62 | 29 | +33 | 5 | 59 | Advance to Liguilla de Ascenso |
| 6 | Atlético Pachuca | 30 | 17 | 4 | 9 | 53 | 21 | +32 | 2 | 57 | Advance to Liguilla de Ascenso |
| 7 | Tuzos Pachuca | 30 | 16 | 4 | 10 | 61 | 33 | +28 | 1 | 53 | |
| 8 | Matamoros | 30 | 14 | 8 | 8 | 59 | 37 | +22 | 2 | 52 | |
| 9 | Atlético Toltecas | 30 | 12 | 10 | 8 | 50 | 45 | +5 | 6 | 52 | |
| 10 | Sk Sport | 30 | 13 | 6 | 11 | 44 | 30 | +14 | 4 | 49 | |
| 11 | Atlético Tulancingo | 30 | 12 | 7 | 11 | 58 | 35 | +23 | 4 | 47 | |
| 12 | C.D. Tulancingo | 30 | 9 | 7 | 14 | 27 | 29 | −2 | 5 | 39 | |
| 13 | Guerreros de la Plata | 30 | 8 | 5 | 17 | 32 | 57 | −25 | 3 | 32 | |
| 14 | Unión Astros | 30 | 4 | 5 | 21 | 26 | 79 | −53 | 3 | 20 | |
| 15 | Halcones Zúñiga | 30 | 2 | 2 | 26 | 17 | 164 | −147 | 1 | 9 | |
| 16 | CEFOR "Chaco" Giménez | 30 | 0 | 1 | 29 | 16 | 125 | −109 | 0 | 1 | |

Updated to match(es) played on 15 April 2023. Source: Liga TDP

== Group 9 ==
Group with 10 teams from Hidalgo, Puebla, San Luis Potosí and Veracruz.

=== Teams ===
Location of teams in the 2022–23 Liga TDP Group 9

| Team | City | Home ground | Capacity | Affiliate | Official Name |
|---|---|---|---|---|---|
| Atlético Huauchinango | Huauchinango, Puebla | Nido Águila | 1,000 | – | Atlético Boca del Río |
| Atlético Huejutla | Huejutla , Hidalgo | Capitán Antonio Reyes Cabrera "El Tordo" | 1,000 | – | – |
| Garzas Blancas | Axtla de Terrazas, San Luis Potosí | Garzas Blancas | 1,000 | – | – |
| Orgullo Surtam | Tampico, Tamaulipas | Tamaulipas | 19,667 | – | – |
| Papanes de Papantla | Papantla, Veracruz | Tlahuanapan | 1,000 | – | — |
| Poza Rica | Poza Rica, Veracruz | Heriberto Jara Corona | 10,000 | – | — |
| Sultanes de Tamazunchale | Tamazunchale, San Luis Potosí | Unidad Deportiva Tamazunchale | 2,000 | – | – |
| Tantoyuca | Tantoyuca, Veracruz | Campo ADA | 1,000 | – | – |
| Tuxpan | Tuxpan, Veracruz | Álvaro Lorenzo Fernández | 5,000 | – | – |
| Venados de Misantla | Misantla, Veracruz | Unidad Deportiva El Zotoluco | 1,000 | – | – |

=== League table ===
| Pos | Team | Pld | W | D | L | GF | GA | GD | BP | Pts | Qualification or relegation |
|---|---|---|---|---|---|---|---|---|---|---|---|
| 1 | Poza Rica | 27 | 23 | 3 | 1 | 79 | 16 | +63 | 3 | 75 | Advance to Liguilla de Ascenso |
| 2 | Orgullo Surtam | 27 | 20 | 4 | 3 | 61 | 20 | +41 | 2 | 66 | Advance to Liguilla de Ascenso |
| 3 | Atlético Huauchinango | 27 | 13 | 6 | 8 | 43 | 28 | +15 | 4 | 49 | Advance to Liguilla de Ascenso |
| 4 | Sultanes de Tamazunchale | 27 | 13 | 5 | 9 | 34 | 33 | +1 | 2 | 46 | Advance to Liguilla de Ascenso |
| 5 | Garzas Blancas | 27 | 11 | 6 | 10 | 36 | 34 | +2 | 2 | 41 | |
| 6 | Venados de Misantla | 27 | 9 | 7 | 11 | 36 | 38 | −2 | 4 | 38 | |
| 7 | Papanes de Papantla | 27 | 7 | 5 | 15 | 22 | 46 | −24 | 3 | 29 | |
| 8 | Tantoyuca | 27 | 5 | 7 | 15 | 30 | 46 | −16 | 2 | 24 | |
| 9 | Atlético Huejutla | 27 | 5 | 5 | 17 | 23 | 56 | −33 | 3 | 23 | |
| 10 | Tuxpan | 27 | 4 | 2 | 21 | 20 | 67 | −47 | 0 | 14 | |

Updated to match(es) played on 15 April 2023. Source: Liga TDP

== Group 10 ==
Group with 13 teams from Guanajuato and Querétaro.

Location of teams in the 2022–23 Liga TDP Group 10 (Guanajuato)
Location of teams in the 2022–23 Liga TDP Group 10 (Querétaro)

=== Teams ===
| Team | City | Home ground | Capacity | Affiliate | Official name |
|---|---|---|---|---|---|
| Celaya | Comonfort, Guanajuato | Brígido Vargas | 4,000 | Celaya | – |
| Celaya Linces | Celaya, Guanajuato | Unidad Deportiva Norte | 1,000 | – | – |
| Correcaminos Tequisquiapan | Tequisquiapan, Querétaro | Unidad Deportiva Emiliano Zapata | 1,000 | Correcaminos UAT | Cañada CTM |
| Estudiantes de Querétaro | Querétaro, Querétaro | Casa de la Juventud INDEREQ | 1,000 | – | – |
| Fundadores El Marqués | El Marqués, Querétaro | Unidad Deportiva La Cañada | 2,000 | – | – |
| Inter de Querétaro | Querétaro, Querétaro | Parque Bicentenario | 1,000 | Inter de Querétaro | – |
| Inter San Pablo | Querétaro, Querétaro | Parque Bicentenario | 1,000 | Inter de Querétaro | Querétaro 3D |
| Lobos ITECA | San Luis de la Paz, Guanajuato | El Internado | 1,500 | – | – |
| Mineros Querétaro | Colón, Querétaro | Universidad CEICKOR | 500 | Mineros de Zacatecas | – |
| Oro La Piedad Querétaro | Querétaro, Querétaro | El Infiernillo | 1,000 | – | – |
| San Juan del Río | San Juan del Río, Querétaro | Unidad Deportiva Norte | 1,000 | – | – |
| San Miguel Internacional | San Miguel de Allende, Guanajuato | José María 'Capi' Correa | 4,000 | – | – |
| Titanes de Querétaro | San José Iturbide, Guanajuato | Unidad Deportiva San José Iturbide | 1,000 | – | – |

=== League table ===
| Pos | Team | Pld | W | D | L | GF | GA | GD | BP | Pts | Qualification or relegation |
|---|---|---|---|---|---|---|---|---|---|---|---|
| 1 | Lobos ITECA | 24 | 17 | 5 | 2 | 75 | 34 | +41 | 3 | 59 | Advance to Liguilla de Ascenso |
| 2 | Titanes de Querétaro | 24 | 14 | 8 | 2 | 51 | 24 | +27 | 5 | 55 | Advance to Liguilla de Ascenso |
| 3 | Celaya Linces | 24 | 11 | 7 | 6 | 43 | 32 | +11 | 5 | 45 | Advance to Liguilla de Ascenso |
| 4 | Fundadores El Marqués | 24 | 12 | 6 | 6 | 39 | 30 | +9 | 1 | 43 | Advance to Liguilla de Ascenso |
| 5 | Celaya | 24 | 10 | 5 | 9 | 39 | 34 | +5 | 2 | 37 | |
| 6 | Correcaminos Tequisquiapan | 24 | 9 | 6 | 9 | 49 | 43 | +6 | 3 | 36 | |
| 7 | Mineros Querétaro | 24 | 8 | 7 | 9 | 42 | 36 | +6 | 3 | 34 | |
| 8 | San Juan del Río | 24 | 8 | 6 | 10 | 47 | 55 | −8 | 4 | 34 | |
| 9 | Estudiantes de Querétaro | 24 | 8 | 6 | 10 | 34 | 39 | −5 | 1 | 31 | |
| 10 | Inter de Querétaro | 24 | 7 | 5 | 12 | 33 | 47 | −14 | 4 | 30 | |
| 11 | Oro La Piedad Querétaro | 24 | 6 | 6 | 12 | 26 | 38 | −12 | 3 | 27 | |
| 12 | San Miguel Internacional | 24 | 6 | 6 | 12 | 28 | 43 | −15 | 3 | 27 | |
| 13 | Inter San Pablo | 24 | 2 | 3 | 19 | 28 | 79 | −51 | 1 | 10 | |

Updated to match(es) played on 15 April 2023. Source: Liga TDP

== Group 11 ==
Group with 9 teams from Guanajuato and Michoacán.

=== Teams ===
Location of teams in the 2022–23 Liga TDP Group 11 (Michoacán)
Location of teams in the 2022–23 Liga TDP Group 11 (Guanajuato)

| Team | City | Home ground | Capacity | Affiliate | Official name |
|---|---|---|---|---|---|
| Aguacateros de Peribán | Peribán, Michoacán | Municipal Peribán | 3,000 | – | – |
| Atlético Chavinda | Chavinda, Michoacán | Club Campestre Chavinda | 600 | – | – |
| Atlético Valladolid | Morelia, Michoacán | Complejo Deportivo Bicentenario | 1,000 | – | – |
| Delfines de Abasolo | Abasolo, Guanajuato | Municipal de Abasolo | 2,500 | – | – |
| Furia Azul | Pátzcuaro, Michoacán | Furia Azul | 3,000 | – | – |
| H2O Purépechas | Morelia, Michoacán | Venustiano Carranza | 17,600 | Atlético Morelia | – |
| Huetamo | Huetamo, Michoacán | Unidad Deportiva Simón Bolívar | 1,000 | La Piedad | Degollado |
| Michoacán F.C. | Pátzcuaro, Michoacán | Deportivo Adagol | 500 | – | – |
| Salamanca | Salamanca, Guanajuato | El Molinito | 2,500 | – | Jaral del Progreso |

=== League table ===
| Pos | Team | Pld | W | D | L | GF | GA | GD | BP | Pts | Qualification or relegation |
|---|---|---|---|---|---|---|---|---|---|---|---|
| 1 | Aguacateros de Peribán | 24 | 18 | 5 | 1 | 71 | 12 | +59 | 3 | 62 | Advance to Liguilla de Ascenso |
| 2 | H2O Purépechas | 24 | 18 | 5 | 1 | 59 | 16 | +43 | 3 | 62 | Advance to Liguilla de Ascenso |
| 3 | Atlético Chavinda | 24 | 18 | 2 | 4 | 69 | 26 | +43 | 1 | 57 | Advance to Liguilla de Ascenso |
| 4 | Delfines de Abasolo | 24 | 10 | 4 | 10 | 49 | 46 | +3 | 3 | 37 | |
| 5 | Furia Azul | 24 | 9 | 2 | 13 | 24 | 44 | −20 | 1 | 30 | |
| 6 | Huetamo | 24 | 8 | 2 | 14 | 30 | 59 | −29 | 1 | 27 | |
| 7 | Michoacán F.C. | 24 | 6 | 3 | 15 | 26 | 22 | +4 | 2 | 23 | |
| 8 | Salamanca | 24 | 5 | 5 | 14 | 26 | 47 | −21 | 0 | 20 | |
| 9 | Atlético Valladolid | 24 | 2 | 0 | 22 | 7 | 89 | −82 | 0 | 6 | |

Updated to match(es) played on 15 April 2023. Source: Liga TDP

== Group 12 ==
Group with 12 teams from Aguascalientes, Guanajuato, Jalisco, San Luis Potosí and Zacatecas.

=== Teams ===
Location of teams in the 2022–23 Liga TDP Group 12 (Guanajuato and Jalisco)
Location of teams in the 2022–23 Liga TDP Group 12 (Aguascalientes, San Luis Potosí and Zacatecas)

| Team | City | Home ground | Capacity | Affiliate | Official name |
|---|---|---|---|---|---|
| Atlético ECCA | Silao, Guanajuato | Polideportivo Los Eucaliptos | 1,000 | – | – |
| Atlético Leonés | León, Guanajuato | Unidad Deportiva Enrique Fernández Martínez | 2,000 | – | – |
| Cachorros de León | León, Guanajuato | Instituto Oviedo Naútico | 500 | – | Fut-Car |
| Calor León | León, Guanajuato | CODE Las Joyas | 1,000 | Calor | – |
| Empresarios del Rincón | Purísima del Rincón, Guanajuato | Unidad Deportiva de Purísima | 1,000 | – | Real Olmeca Sport |
| León GEN | Lagos de Moreno, Jalisco | Complejo Deportivo GEN | 2,000 | León | – |
| Mineros de Zacatecas | Zacatecas, Zacatecas | Unidad Deportiva Guadalupe | 1,000 | Mineros de Zacatecas | – |
| Necaxa | Aguascalientes, Aguascalientes | Victoria | 23,000 | Necaxa | – |
| Pabellón | Pabellón de Arteaga, Aguascalientes | Ferrocarrilero | 2,000 | – | – |
| Suré | León, Guanajuato | CODE Las Joyas | 1,000 | – | – |
| Tuzos UAZ | Zacatecas, Zacatecas | Universitario Unidad Deportiva Norte | 5,000 | Tuzos UAZ | – |
| Zorros San Luis | San Luis Potosí, San Luis Potosí | Unidad Deportiva Adolfo López Mateos | 1,000 | – | FC Zacatecas |

=== League table ===
| Pos | Team | Pld | W | D | L | GF | GA | GD | BP | Pts | Qualification or relegation |
|---|---|---|---|---|---|---|---|---|---|---|---|
| 1 | Cachorros de León | 22 | 17 | 2 | 3 | 60 | 26 | +34 | 1 | 54 | Advance to Liguilla de Ascenso |
| 2 | Atlético Leonés | 22 | 15 | 2 | 5 | 65 | 23 | +42 | 2 | 49 | Advance to Liguilla de Ascenso |
| 3 | Tuzos UAZ | 22 | 14 | 6 | 2 | 49 | 24 | +25 | 1 | 49 | Advance to Liguilla de Ascenso |
| 4 | Necaxa | 22 | 10 | 7 | 5 | 53 | 34 | +19 | 5 | 42 | Advance to Liguilla de No Ascenso |
| 5 | Mineros de Zacatecas | 22 | 11 | 3 | 8 | 43 | 28 | +15 | 2 | 38 | Advance to Liguilla de No Ascenso |
| 6 | Atlético ECCA | 22 | 10 | 3 | 9 | 35 | 40 | −5 | 1 | 34 | |
| 7 | Suré | 22 | 8 | 5 | 9 | 40 | 37 | +3 | 3 | 32 | |
| 8 | Empresarios del Rincón | 22 | 6 | 3 | 13 | 30 | 46 | −16 | 3 | 24 | |
| 9 | Zorros San Luis | 22 | 6 | 5 | 11 | 31 | 36 | −5 | 0 | 23 | |
| 10 | León GEN | 22 | 4 | 7 | 11 | 18 | 34 | −16 | 3 | 22 | |
| 11 | Pabellón | 22 | 4 | 6 | 12 | 29 | 48 | −19 | 3 | 21 | |
| 12 | Calor León | 22 | 2 | 1 | 19 | 13 | 90 | −77 | 1 | 8 | |

Updated to match(es) played on 15 April 2023. Source: Liga TDP

== Group 13 ==
Group with 12 teams from Jalisco.

=== Teams ===
Location of teams in the 2022–23 Liga TDP Group 13

| Team | City | Home ground | Capacity | Affiliate | Official name |
|---|---|---|---|---|---|
| Acatlán | Zapotlanejo, Jalisco | Miguel Hidalgo | 1,700 | – | – |
| Agaveros | Tlajomulco de Zúñiga, Jalisco | Campos Elite | 1,000 | – | – |
| Alteños Acatic | Acatic, Jalisco | Unidad Deportiva Acatic | 1,000 | Tepatitlán | – |
| Aves Blancas | Tepatitlán de Morelos, Jalisco | Corredor Industrial | 1,200 | – | – |
| Ayense | Ayotlán, Jalisco | Chino Rivas | 4,000 | – | – |
| Gorilas de Juanacatlán | Juanacatlán, Jalisco | Club Juanacatlán | 500 | – | – |
| Nacional | Zapopan, Jalisco | Club Deportivo Imperio | 500 | – | – |
| Oro | Tonalá, Jalisco | Unidad Deportiva Revolución Mexicana | 3,000 | – | – |
| Salamanca | Yahualica, Jalisco | Las Ánimas | 8,500 | Salamanca CF UDS | – |
| Tapatíos Soccer | Zapopan, Jalisco | Club Deportivo Aviña | 1,000 | – | – |
| Tepatitlán | Tepatitlán de Morelos, Jalisco | Gregorio "Tepa" Gómez | 8,085 | Tepatitlán | – |
| Tornados Tlaquepaque | Tlaquepaque, Jalisco | Complejo Deportivo Maracaná | 500 | – | Atlético Cocula |

=== League table ===
| Pos | Team | Pld | W | D | L | GF | GA | GD | BP | Pts | Qualification or relegation |
|---|---|---|---|---|---|---|---|---|---|---|---|
| 1 | Acatlán | 22 | 14 | 6 | 2 | 47 | 15 | +32 | 3 | 51 | Advance to Liguilla de Ascenso |
| 2 | Tapatíos Soccer | 22 | 15 | 3 | 4 | 44 | 18 | +26 | 3 | 51 | Advance to Liguilla de Ascenso |
| 3 | Ayense | 22 | 16 | 2 | 4 | 51 | 16 | +35 | 0 | 50 | Advance to Liguilla de Ascenso |
| 4 | Aves Blancas | 22 | 14 | 5 | 3 | 52 | 24 | +28 | 3 | 50 | Advance to Liguilla de Ascenso |
| 5 | Tepatitlán | 22 | 14 | 3 | 5 | 50 | 22 | +28 | 2 | 47 | |
| 6 | Gorilas de Juanacatlán | 22 | 14 | 3 | 5 | 48 | 29 | +19 | 1 | 46 | |
| 7 | Salamanca | 22 | 7 | 5 | 10 | 32 | 46 | −14 | 1 | 27 | |
| 8 | Alteños Acatic | 22 | 4 | 4 | 14 | 20 | 46 | −26 | 2 | 18 | |
| 9 | Tornados Tlaquepaque | 22 | 4 | 3 | 15 | 16 | 43 | −27 | 1 | 16 | |
| 10 | Oro | 22 | 3 | 3 | 16 | 22 | 61 | −39 | 3 | 15 | |
| 11 | Agaveros | 22 | 3 | 3 | 16 | 25 | 50 | −25 | 1 | 13 | |
| 12 | Nacional | 22 | 3 | 2 | 17 | 22 | 59 | −37 | 1 | 12 | |

Updated to match(es) played on 16 April 2023. Source: Liga TDP

== Group 14 ==
Group with 12 teams from Colima and Jalisco.

=== Teams ===
Location of teams in the 2022–23 Liga TDP Group 14

| Team | City | Home ground | Capacity | Affiliate | Official name |
|---|---|---|---|---|---|
| AFAR Manzanillo | Manzanillo, Colima | Abelardo L. Rodríguez | 1,000 | – | – |
| Caja Oblatos | Guadalajara, Jalisco | Unidad Deportiva Cuauhtémoc | 1,000 | – | – |
| Catedráticos Elite | Etzatlán, Jalisco | Unidad Deportiva Etzatlán | 1,000 | Catedráticos Elite | – |
| Charales de Chapala | Chapala, Jalisco | Municipal Juan Rayo | 1,200 | – | – |
| Deportivo Cimagol | Tlaquepaque, Jalisco | Club Deportivo del Valle | 1,000 | – | – |
| Diablos Tesistán | Zapopan, Jalisco | Club Diablos Tesistán | 1,000 | – | – |
| Gallos Viejos | Zapopan, Jalisco | Club Pumas Tesistán | 1,000 | – | – |
| Halcones de Zapopan | Zapopan, Jalisco | Colegio Once México | 1,000 | Halcones de Zapopan | – |
| Leones Negros UdeG | Zapopan, Jalisco | Club Deportivo U. de G. | 3,000 | Leones Negros UdeG | – |
| Pro Training Camp | Ocotlán, Jalisco | Municipal Benito Juárez | 1,500 | – | – |
| Real Ánimas de Sayula | Sayula, Jalisco | Gustavo Díaz Ordaz | 4,000 | – | – |
| Tecos | Zapopan, Jalisco | Tres de Marzo | 18,779 | Tecos | – |

=== League table ===
| Pos | Team | Pld | W | D | L | GF | GA | GD | BP | Pts | Qualification or relegation |
|---|---|---|---|---|---|---|---|---|---|---|---|
| 1 | Diablos Tesistán | 22 | 17 | 2 | 3 | 75 | 13 | +62 | 1 | 54 | Advance to Liguilla de Ascenso |
| 2 | Tecos | 22 | 11 | 7 | 4 | 46 | 31 | +15 | 6 | 46 | Advance to Liguilla de No Ascenso |
| 3 | Catedráticos Elite | 22 | 14 | 3 | 5 | 42 | 30 | +12 | 0 | 45 | Advance to Liguilla de Ascenso |
| 4 | Leones Negros UdeG | 22 | 12 | 3 | 7 | 49 | 33 | +16 | 1 | 40 | Advance to Liguilla de No Ascenso |
| 5 | AFAR Manzanillo | 22 | 11 | 5 | 6 | 48 | 39 | +9 | 0 | 38 | Advance to Liguilla de Ascenso |
| 6 | Caja Oblatos | 22 | 9 | 7 | 6 | 40 | 35 | +5 | 4 | 38 | |
| 7 | Halcones de Zapopan | 22 | 8 | 7 | 7 | 34 | 32 | +2 | 2 | 33 | |
| 8 | Charales de Chapala | 22 | 8 | 5 | 9 | 32 | 33 | −1 | 4 | 33 | |
| 9 | Real Ánimas de Sayula | 22 | 6 | 6 | 10 | 26 | 35 | −9 | 3 | 27 | |
| 10 | Gallos Viejos | 22 | 4 | 5 | 13 | 23 | 42 | −19 | 1 | 18 | |
| 11 | Deportivo Cimagol | 22 | 3 | 3 | 16 | 24 | 58 | −34 | 3 | 15 | |
| 12 | Pro Training Camp | 22 | 2 | 1 | 19 | 20 | 78 | −58 | 1 | 8 | |

Updated to match(es) played on 16 April 2023. Source: Liga TDP

== Group 15 ==
Group with 12 teams from Jalisco, Nayarit and Sinaloa.

=== Teams ===
Location of teams in the 2022–23 Liga TDP Group 15 (Jalisco and Nayarit)
Location of teams in the 2022–23 Liga TDP Group 15 (Sinaloa)

| Team | City | Home ground | Capacity | Affiliate | Official name |
|---|---|---|---|---|---|
| Alfareros de Tonalá | Tonalá, Jalisco | Unidad Deportiva Revolución Mexicana | 3,000 | – | – |
| Atlético Acaponeta | Acaponeta, Nayarit | Unidad Deportiva Acaponeta | 1,000 | – | – |
| Atlético Nayarit | Xalisco, Nayarit | Unidad Deportiva AFEN "Dos Toños" | 2,000 | – | – |
| Coras | Tepic, Nayarit | Olímpico UAN | 3,000 | Coras | – |
| Deportivo Tala | Tala, Jalisco | Carlos Rodríguez Álvarez | 1,000 | – | Volcanes de Colima |
| Dorados de Sinaloa | Culiacán, Sinaloa | Dorados | 20,108 | Dorados de Sinaloa | – |
| Fénix CFAR | San Isidro Mazatepec, Jalisco | La Fortaleza | 1,000 | – | – |
| FuraMochis | Los Mochis, Sinaloa | Club FuraMochis | 1,000 | – | – |
| Legado del Centenario | Ixtlahuacán de los Membrillos, Jalisco | Unidad Deportiva Ixtlahuacán de los Membrillos | 1,000 | – | – |
| Puerto Vallarta | Puerto Vallarta, Jalisco | Agustín Flores Contreras | 3,000 | – | – |
| Tigres de Alica | Xalisco, Nayarit | Unidad Deportiva AFEN "Dos Toños" | 2,000 | – | – |
| Xalisco | Xalisco, Nayarit | Unidad Deportiva Landareñas | 1,500 | – | – |

=== League table ===
| Pos | Team | Pld | W | D | L | GF | GA | GD | BP | Pts | Qualification or relegation |
|---|---|---|---|---|---|---|---|---|---|---|---|
| 1 | Xalisco | 22 | 11 | 7 | 4 | 33 | 22 | +11 | 6 | 46 | Advance to Liguilla de Ascenso |
| 2 | FuraMochis | 22 | 8 | 13 | 1 | 32 | 18 | +14 | 8 | 45 | Advance to Liguilla de No Ascenso |
| 3 | Dorados de Sinaloa | 22 | 10 | 8 | 4 | 32 | 25 | +7 | 4 | 42 | Advance to Liguilla de No Ascenso |
| 4 | Puerto Vallarta | 22 | 9 | 10 | 3 | 37 | 28 | +9 | 3 | 40 | Advance to Liguilla de Ascenso |
| 5 | Coras | 22 | 8 | 7 | 7 | 33 | 24 | +9 | 3 | 34 | |
| 6 | Deportivo Tala | 22 | 9 | 5 | 8 | 37 | 27 | +10 | 1 | 33 | |
| 7 | Tigres de Alica | 22 | 8 | 6 | 8 | 23 | 24 | −1 | 3 | 33 | |
| 8 | Fénix CFAR | 22 | 6 | 8 | 8 | 40 | 48 | −8 | 5 | 31 | |
| 9 | Legado del Centenario | 22 | 8 | 4 | 10 | 27 | 28 | −1 | 2 | 30 | |
| 10 | Atlético Acaponeta | 22 | 5 | 8 | 9 | 32 | 38 | −6 | 5 | 28 | |
| 11 | Alfareros de Tonalá | 22 | 6 | 6 | 10 | 23 | 34 | −11 | 1 | 25 | |
| 12 | Atlético Nayarit | 22 | 1 | 4 | 17 | 10 | 43 | −33 | 2 | 9 | |

Updated to match(es) played on 15 April 2023. Source: Liga TDP

== Group 16 ==
Group with 16 teams from Coahuila, Nuevo León and Tamaulipas.

=== Teams ===
Location of teams in the 2022–23 Liga TDP Group 16 (Nuevo León)
Location of teams in the 2022–23 Liga TDP Group 16 (Coahuila)
Location of teams in the 2022–23 Liga TDP Group 16 (Tamaulipas)

| Team | City | Home ground | Capacity | Affiliate | Official name |
|---|---|---|---|---|---|
| Cadereyta | Cadereyta, Nuevo León | Clemente Salinas Netro | 1,000 | – | – |
| Correcaminos UAT | Ciudad Victoria, Tamaulipas | Profesor Eugenio Alvizo Porras | 5,000 | Correcaminos UAT | – |
| Gallos Nuevo León | Salinas Victoria, Nuevo León | Unidad Deportiva Salinas Victoria | 1,000 | – | – |
| Gavilanes de Matamoros | Matamoros, Tamaulipas | El Hogar | 22,000 | Gavilanes de Matamoros | Ho Gar H. Matamoros |
| Guerreros Reynosa | Reynosa, Tamaulipas | Unidad Deportiva Solidaridad | 20,000 | – | – |
| Halcones de Saltillo | Saltillo, Coahuila | Olímpico Francisco I. Madero | 7,000 | – | San Isidro Laguna |
| Irritilas | San Pedro, Coahuila | Quinta Ximena | 1,000 | – | – |
| Mineros Reynosa | Reynosa, Tamaulipas | Unidad Deportiva Solidaridad | 20,000 | Mineros de Zacatecas | Deportivo Soria |
| Real San Cosme | General Escobedo, Nuevo León | Unidad Deportiva Lázaro Cárdenas | 1,000 | – | – |
| Saltillo Soccer | Saltillo, Coahuila | Olímpico Francisco I. Madero | 7,000 | Saltillo | – |
| Santiago | Santiago, Nuevo León | FCD El Barrial | 570 | – | – |
| San Nicolás | Apodaca, Nuevo León | Unidad Deportiva Centenario del Ejército Mexicano | 1,000 | – | – |
| San Pedro 7–10 | San Pedro Garza García, Nuevo León | Sporti Valle Poniente | 500 | – | – |
| Tigres SD | General Zuazua, Nuevo León | Instalaciones de Zuazua | 800 | Tigres UANL | – |

=== League table ===
| Pos | Team | Pld | W | D | L | GF | GA | GD | BP | Pts | Qualification or relegation |
|---|---|---|---|---|---|---|---|---|---|---|---|
| 1 | Santiago | 26 | 18 | 4 | 4 | 56 | 16 | +40 | 4 | 62 | Advance to Liguilla de Ascenso |
| 2 | Saltillo Soccer | 26 | 16 | 7 | 3 | 51 | 14 | +37 | 2 | 57 | Advance to Liguilla de Ascenso |
| 3 | Mineros Reynosa | 26 | 17 | 4 | 5 | 51 | 24 | +27 | 1 | 56 | Advance to Liguilla de Ascenso |
| 4 | Cadereyta | 26 | 18 | 1 | 7 | 53 | 25 | +28 | 0 | 55 | Advance to Liguilla de Ascenso |
| 5 | Irritilas | 26 | 14 | 6 | 6 | 40 | 26 | +14 | 3 | 51 | |
| 6 | Gavilanes de Matamoros | 26 | 10 | 7 | 9 | 27 | 26 | +1 | 4 | 41 | |
| 7 | Correcaminos UAT | 26 | 10 | 8 | 8 | 30 | 32 | −2 | 3 | 41 | Advance to Liguilla de No Ascenso |
| 8 | Gallos Nuevo León | 26 | 6 | 8 | 12 | 31 | 39 | −8 | 7 | 33 | |
| 9 | San Pedro 7–10 | 26 | 9 | 2 | 15 | 33 | 46 | −13 | 1 | 30 | |
| 10 | San Nicolás | 26 | 7 | 4 | 15 | 16 | 44 | −28 | 3 | 28 | |
| 11 | Halcones de Saltillo | 26 | 6 | 6 | 14 | 22 | 47 | −25 | 2 | 26 | |
| 12 | Real San Cosme | 26 | 7 | 2 | 17 | 18 | 46 | −28 | 2 | 25 | |
| 13 | Tigres SD | 26 | 5 | 7 | 14 | 34 | 46 | −12 | 2 | 24 | |
| 14 | Guerreros Reynosa | 26 | 3 | 6 | 17 | 22 | 53 | −31 | 2 | 17 | |

Updated to match(es) played on 15 April 2023. Source: Liga TDP

== Group 17 ==
Group with 11 teams from Baja California, Chihuahua and Sonora.

=== Teams ===
Location of teams in the 2022–23 Liga TDP Group 17

| Team | City | Home ground | Capacity | Affiliate | Official name |
|---|---|---|---|---|---|
| Búhos UNISON | Hermosillo, Sonora | Miguel Castro Servín | 4,000 | – | – |
| Cachanillas | Mexicali, Baja California | Eduardo "Boticas" Pérez | 2,000 | – | – |
| CEPROFFA | Ciudad Juárez, Chihuahua | CEPROFFA | 1,000 | – | – |
| Chihuahua | Chihuahua, Chihuahua | Olímpico Universitario José Reyes Baeza | 22,000 | Chihuahua | – |
| Cimarrones de Sonora | Hermosillo, Sonora | Unidad Deportiva La Milla | 1,000 | Cimarrones de Sonora | – |
| Cobras Fut Premier | Ciudad Juárez, Chihuahua | Complejo Temop Axis | 500 | – | – |
| Etchojoa | Etchojoa, Sonora | Trigueros | 1,500 | – | – |
| Guaymas | Guaymas, Sonora | Unidad Deportiva Julio Alfonso | 3,000 | – | – |
| La Tribu de Ciudad Juárez | Ciudad Juárez, Chihuahua | Complejo La Tribu | 500 | – | – |
| Obson Dynamo | Ciudad Obregón, Sonora | Hundido ITSON | 3,000 | – | – |
| Xolos Hermosillo | Hermosillo, Sonora | Cancha Aarón Gamal Aguirre Fimbres | 1,000 | Tijuana | – |

=== League table ===
| Pos | Team | Pld | W | D | L | GF | GA | GD | BP | Pts | Qualification or relegation |
|---|---|---|---|---|---|---|---|---|---|---|---|
| 1 | Chihuahua | 20 | 14 | 4 | 2 | 44 | 14 | +30 | 2 | 48 | Advance to Liguilla de No Ascenso |
| 2 | Búhos UNISON | 20 | 12 | 3 | 5 | 45 | 33 | +12 | 2 | 41 | Advance to Liguilla de Ascenso |
| 3 | La Tribu de Ciudad Juárez | 20 | 11 | 4 | 5 | 53 | 28 | +25 | 3 | 40 | Advance to Liguilla de Ascenso |
| 4 | CEPROFFA | 20 | 10 | 5 | 5 | 41 | 29 | +12 | 3 | 38 | Advance to Liguilla de Ascenso |
| 5 | Etchojoa | 20 | 8 | 9 | 3 | 33 | 22 | +11 | 5 | 38 | |
| 6 | Cimarrones de Sonora | 20 | 9 | 6 | 5 | 41 | 23 | +18 | 1 | 34 | Advance to Liguilla de No Ascenso |
| 7 | Xolos Hermosillo | 20 | 6 | 5 | 9 | 21 | 27 | −6 | 3 | 26 | |
| 8 | Cachanillas | 20 | 7 | 3 | 10 | 27 | 37 | −10 | 2 | 26 | |
| 9 | Obson Dynamo | 20 | 5 | 5 | 10 | 25 | 38 | −13 | 1 | 21 | |
| 10 | Cobras Fut Premier | 20 | 4 | 1 | 15 | 19 | 48 | −29 | 0 | 13 | |
| 11 | Guaymas | 20 | 1 | 1 | 18 | 13 | 63 | −50 | 1 | 5 | |

Updated to match(es) played on 15 April 2023. Source: Liga TDP

== Group 18 ==
Group with 5 teams from Baja California.

=== Teams ===
Location of teams in the 2022–23 Liga TDP Group 18

| Team | City | Home ground | Capacity | Affiliate |
|---|---|---|---|---|
| 40 Grados MXL | Mexicali, Baja California | Unidad Deportiva Baja California | 1,000 | – |
| Gladiadores Tijuana | Tijuana, Baja California | CREA Tijuana | 10,000 | – |
| London | Tijuana, Baja California | CREA Tijuana | 10,000 | – |
| Rosarito | Rosarito Beach, Baja California | Andrés Luna | 2,000 | – |
| Tecate | Tecate, Baja California | Unidad Deportiva Eufrasio Santana | 1,000 | – |

=== League table ===
| Pos | Team | Pld | W | D | L | GF | GA | GD | BP | Pts | Qualification or relegation |
|---|---|---|---|---|---|---|---|---|---|---|---|
| 1 | London | 16 | 10 | 2 | 4 | 28 | 17 | +11 | 1 | 33 | Advance to Liguilla de Ascenso |
| 2 | Gladiadores Tijuana | 16 | 9 | 2 | 5 | 28 | 18 | +10 | 1 | 30 | Advance to Liguilla de Ascenso |
| 3 | Rosarito | 16 | 5 | 5 | 6 | 23 | 28 | −5 | 4 | 24 | |
| 4 | 40 Grados MXL | 16 | 5 | 3 | 8 | 25 | 32 | −7 | 0 | 18 | |
| 5 | Tecate | 16 | 4 | 2 | 10 | 17 | 26 | −9 | 1 | 15 | |

Updated to match(es) played on 15 April 2023. Source: Liga TDP

== Promotion Play–offs ==
The Promotion Play–offs will consist of seven phases. Classify 64 teams, the number varies according to the number of teams in each group, being between three and eight clubs per group. The country will be divided into two zones: South Zone (Groups 1 to 8) and North Zone (Groups 9 to 18). Eliminations will be held according to the average obtained by each team, being ordered from best to worst by their percentage throughout the season.

As of 2020–21 season, the names of the knockout stages were modified as follows: Round of 32, Round of 16, Quarter-finals, Semifinals, Zone Final and Final, this as a consequence of the division of the country into two zones, for so the teams only face clubs from the same region until the final series.

=== Round of 32 ===
The first legs were played on 19 and 20 April, and the second legs will be played on 22 and 23 April 2023.

==== South Zone ====
| Team 1 | Agg. | Team 2 | 1st leg | 2nd leg |
|---|---|---|---|---|
| CDM | 4–1 | Oceanía | 2–0 | 2–1 |
| Artesanos Metepec | 5–0 | Tenancingo | 2–0 | 3–0 |
| Aragón | 3–1 | Atlético Pachuca | 0–1 | 3–0 |
| Muxes | 3–1 | Académicos UGM | 2–1 | 1–0 |
| Tigres Yautepec | 6–1 | Oaxtepec | 1–1 | 5–0 |
| Águilas UAGro | (p) 3–3 (4–1) | Cuervos Blancos | 0–3 | 3–0 |
| Delfines UGM | (p) 2–2 (4–2) | Bombarderos de Tecámac | 1–1 | 1–1 |
| Caballeros de Córdoba | 1–1 (1–2) (p) | Hidalguense | 1–1 | 0–0 |
| Chilangos | 5–5 (2–4) (p) | Cruz Azul Lagunas | 1–5 | 4–0 |
| Halcones Negros | 3–0 | Cordobés | 3–0 | 0–0 |
| Búhos de Oaxaca | 3–3 (7–8) (p) | Guerreros DD | 1–2 | 2–1 |
| Estudiantes de Atlacomulco | 10–2 | Héroes de Zaci | 4–2 | 6–0 |
| Yautepec | 2–3 | Atlético Mexicano | 0–3 | 2–0 |
| Dragones de Oaxaca | 1–2 | Faraones de Texcoco | 0–2 | 1–0 |
| Academia Mineros CDMX | 0–1 | Progreso | 0–1 | 0–0 |
| Inter Playa del Carmen | 4–1 | Pioneros Junior | 2–0 | 2–1 |

==== North Zone ====
| Team 1 | Agg. | Team 2 | 1st leg | 2nd leg |
|---|---|---|---|---|
| Poza Rica | 5–0 | Sultanes de Tamazunchale | 1–0 | 4–0 |
| Aguacateros de Peribán | 4–1 | AFAR Manzanillo | 0–0 | 4–1 |
| H2O Purépechas | 5–3 | Fundadores | 4–2 | 1–1 |
| Lobos ITECA | 6–1 | Atlético Huauchinango | 2–1 | 4–0 |
| Diablos Tesistán | 2–2 (2–4) (p) | Puerto Vallarta | 1–0 | 2–1 |
| Cachorros de León | 3–2 | Gladiadores Tijuana | 1–0 | 2–2 |
| Orgullo Surtam | 3–2 | Celaya Linces | 1–1 | 2–1 |
| Santiago | 2–2 (2–3) (p) | CEPROFFA | 1–1 | 1–1 |
| Atlético Chavinda | 4–3 | La Tribu de Ciudad Juárez | 1–2 | 3–1 |
| Acatlán | 2–1 | Catedráticos Elite | 1–1 | 1–0 |
| Tapatíos Soccer | 2–3 | Búhos UNISON | 0–2 | 2–1 |
| Titanes de Querétaro | 2–3 | London | 0–2 | 2–1 |
| Ayense | 4–3 | Xalisco | 0–1 | 4–2 |
| Aves Blancas | (p) 2–2 (4–1) | Cadereyta | 0–1 | 2–1 |
| Atlético Leonés | 3–4 | Mineros Reynosa | 0–2 | 3–2 |
| Tuzos UAZ | 2–1 | Saltillo Soccer | 1–0 | 1–1 |

=== Round of 16 ===
The first legs will be played on 26 and 27 April, and the second legs will be played on 29 and 30 April 2023.

==== South Zone ====
| Team 1 | Agg. | Team 2 | 1st leg | 2nd leg |
|---|---|---|---|---|
| CDM | 6–0 | Hidalguense | 1–0 | 5–0 |
| Artesanos Metepec | 2–1 | Cruz Azul Lagunas | 1–0 | 1–1 |
| Aragón | 2–0 | Guerreros DD | 0–0 | 2–0 |
| Muxes | 2–1 | Atlético Mexicano | 2–1 | 0–0 |
| Tigres Yautepec | 0–3 | Faraones de Texcoco | 0–0 | 0–3 |
| Águilas UAGro | 2–2 (1–3) (p) | Progreso | 2–0 | 0–2 |
| Delfines UGM | 0–2 | Inter Playa del Carmen | 0–0 | 0–2 |
| Halcones Negros | 2–3 | Estudiantes de Atlacomulco | 0–1 | 2–2 |

==== North Zone ====
| Team 1 | Agg. | Team 2 | 1st leg | 2nd leg |
|---|---|---|---|---|
| Poza Rica | 5–0 | Puerto Vallarta | 2–0 | 3–0 |
| Aguacateros de Peribán | 6–0 | CEPROFFA | 2–0 | 4–0 |
| H2O Purépechas | 3–5 | Búhos UNISON | 1–3 | 2–2 |
| Lobos ITECA | 6–3 | London | 1–3 | 5–0 |
| Cachorros de León | (p) 1–1 (4–3) | Mineros Reynosa | 0–0 | 1–1 |
| Orgullo Surtam | 1–4 | Tuzos UAZ | 0–1 | 1–3 |
| Atlético Chavinda | 3–4 | Aves Blancas | 1–1 | 2–3 |
| Acatlán | 2–2 (4–5) (p) | Ayense | 1–2 | 1–0 |

=== Final stage ===
Zone Quarter–finals
2S | Artesanos Metepec | 3 | 2 | 5
7S | Progreso | 1 | 0 | 1
1S | CDM | 1 | 0 | 1
8S | Faraones de Texcoco | 2 | 1 | 3
3S | Aragón | 1 | 2 | 3
6S | Inter Playa del Carmen | 1 | 1 | 2
4S | Muxes | 1 | 1 | 2 (2)
5S | Estudiantes de Atlacomulco (p) | 0 | 2 | 2 (4)
1N | Poza Rica (p) | 0 | 2 | 2 (4)
8N | Búhos UNISON | 1 | 1 | 2 (3)
4N | Cachorros de León | 3 | 1 | 4
5N | Ayense | 2 | 5 | 7
2N | Aguacateros de Peribán | 0 | 3 | 3
7N | Tuzos UAZ | 1 | 1 | 2
3N | Lobos ITECA | 0 | 3 | 3
6N | Aves Blancas | 0 | 2 | 2

Zone Semi–finals
2S | Artesanos Metepec | 2 | 0 | 2
8S | Faraones de Texcoco | 0 | 1 | 1
3S | Aragón | 3 | 2 | 5
5S | Estudiantes de Atlacomulco | 2 | 0 | 2
1N | Poza Rica (p) | 1 | 2 | 3 (5)
5N | Ayense | 2 | 1 | 3 (4)
2N | Aguacateros de Peribán | 0 | 4 | 4
3N | Lobos ITECA | 1 | 0 | 1

Zone Finals
2S | Artesanos Metepec | 0 | 0 | 0
3S | Aragón | 1 | 0 | 1
1N | Poza Rica | 0 | 0 | 0
2N | Aguacateros de Peribán | 2 | 3 | 5

National Final
3S | Aragón | 0
2N | Aguacateros de Peribán | 2

==== Zone Quarter–finals ====
The first legs were played on 3 and 4 May, and the second legs were played on 6 and 7 May 2023.

| Team 1 | Agg. | Team 2 | 1st leg | 2nd leg |
|---|---|---|---|---|
| CDM | 1–3 | Faraones de Texcoco | 1–2 | 0–1 |
| Artesanos Metepec | 5–1 | Progreso | 3–1 | 2–0 |
| Aragón | 3–2 | Inter Playa del Carmen | 1–1 | 2–1 |
| Muxes | 2–2 (2–4) (p) | Estudiantes de Atlacomulco | 1–0 | 1–2 |
| Poza Rica | (p) 2–2 (4–3) | Búhos UNISON | 0–1 | 2–1 |
| Aguacateros de Peribán | 3–2 | Tuzos UAZ | 0–1 | 3–1 |
| Lobos ITECA | 3–2 | Aves Blancas | 0–0 | 3–2 |
| Cachorros de León | 4–7 | Ayense | 3–2 | 1–5 |

First leg

| 3 May 2023 | Faraones de Texcoco | 2–1 | CDM | Texcoco, State of Mexico |
| 16:00 CST (UTC−6) | Flores 76', 90' | Report | Cibrián 66' | Stadium: Estadio Municipal Claudio Suárez; Attendance: 7,000; Referee: José Andrés Elías Zarzoza |

| 3 May 2023 | Progreso | 1–3 | Artesanos Metepec | Mérida, Yucatán |
| 16:00 CST (UTC−6) | Verde 6' | Report | Robledo 15', 48'; Cárdenas 53' | Stadium: Estadio Carlos Iturralde; Attendance: 50; Referee: Yoel Guzmán Hernández |

| 3 May 2023 | Tuzos UAZ | 1–0 | Aguacateros de Peribán | Guadalupe, Zacatecas |
| 16:00 CST (UTC−6) | Martínez 40' | Report | | Stadium: Unidad Deportiva Guadalupe; Attendance: 500; Referee: Aldo Sebastián Martínez Rodríguez |

| 3 May 2023 | Búhos UNISON | 1–0 | Poza Rica | Hermosillo, Sonora |
| 17:00 MST (UTC−7) | Cota 80' | Report | | Stadium: Cancha Sauceda Aarón Gamal; Attendance: Figo Rodolfo López Valle; Referee: 450 |

| 3 May 2023 | Inter Playa del Carmen | 1–1 | Aragón | Playa del Carmen, Quintana Roo |
| 18:00 EST (UTC−5) | Blancas 61' | Report | Guerrero 21' | Stadium: Unidad Deportiva Mario Villanueva Madrid; Attendance: 400; Referee: Fermín Izquierdo Paz |

| 3 May 2023 | Aves Blancas | 0–0 | Lobos ITECA | Tepatitlán, Jalisco |
| 18:00 CST (UTC−6) | | Report | | Stadium: Estadio Corredor Industrial; Attendance: 600; Referee: Axel Jesús Ibares González |

| 3 May 2023 | Ayense | 2–3 | Cachorros de León | Ayotlán, Jalisco |
| 19:00 CST (UTC−6) | Ríos 53'; Bravo 82' | Report | Zúñiga 22', 66'; Rosales 74' | Stadium: Estadio Chino Rivas; Attendance: 4,500; Referee: Gerardo Yahir Mendoza Sánchez |

| 4 May 2023 | Estudiantes de Atlacomulco | 0–1 | Muxes | Atlacomulco, State of Mexico |
| 16:00 CST (UTC−6) | | Report | Mundo 35' | Stadium: Estadio Municipal de Atlacomulco; Attendance: 500; Referee: Keven Iván Pérez Mendoza |

Second leg

| 6 May 2023 | Aragón | 2–1 (3–2 agg.) | Inter Playa del Carmen | Gustavo A. Madero, Mexico City |
| 11:00 CST (UTC−6) | Bernal 1'; Hernández 76' | Report | Blancas 63' | Stadium: Deportivo Francisco Zarco; Attendance: 500; Referee: Oliver Hernández Fuentes |

| 6 May 2023 | Cachorros de León | 1–5 (4–7 agg.) | Ayense | León, Guanajuato |
| 15:00 CST (UTC−6) | J. González 40' | Report | U. Bravo 7', 48'; Sánchez 15'; I. González 51'; García 78' | Stadium: Instituto Oviedo Náutico; Attendance: 600; Referee: Antonio Toca Varela |

| 6 May 2023 | CDM | 0–1 (1–3 agg.) | Faraones de Texcoco | Venustiano Carranza, Mexico City |
| 16:00 CST (UTC−6) | | Report | Hernández 90' | Stadium: Deportivo Plutarco Elías Calles; Attendance: 1,500; Referee: Omar Alejandro Ortega García |

| 6 May 2023 | Artesanos Metepec | 2–0 (5–1 agg.) | Progreso | Metepec, State of Mexico |
| 16:00 CST (UTC−6) | López 27' (own); Fuentes 43' | Report | | Stadium: Unidad Deportiva Alarcón Hisojo "La Hortaliza"; Attendance: 700; Referee: Benjamín Hernández Rodríguez |

| 6 May 2023 | Aguacateros de Peribán | 3–1 (3–2 agg.) | Tuzos UAZ | Peribán, Michoacán |
| 16:00 CST (UTC−6) | Vidales 1'; Cerda 32'; Pizano 65' | Report | Sandoval 74' | Stadium: Estadio Municipal de Peribán; Attendance: 800; Referee: Maximiliano Arias Guzmán |

| 6 May 2023 | Lobos ITECA | 3–2 (3–2 agg.) | Aves Blancas | San Luis de la Paz, Guanajuato |
| 16:00 CST (UTC−6) | Marín 4', 89'; Rangel 68' | Report | Hernández 50'; Colin 90' | Stadium: Estadio El Internado; Attendance: 1,200; Referee: Edwin Eduardo Morfín Verduzco |

| 6 May 2023 | Poza Rica | 2–1 (2–2 agg.) (4–3 p) | Búhos UNISON | Poza Rica, Veracruz |
| 17:00 CST (UTC−6) | Rodríguez 25'; Trejo 67' | Report | Encinas 60' | Stadium: Estadio Heriberto Jara; Attendance: 3,500; Referee: Luis Ángel Cabrera Carbajal |

| 7 May 2023 | Muxes | 1–2 (2–2 agg.) (2–4 p) | Estudiantes de Atlacomulco | Iztacalco, Mexico City |
| 13:00 CST (UTC−6) | Mundo 42' | Report | Navarrete 11'; Basurto 81' | Stadium: Magdalena Mixhuca Sports City Field 1 Attendance: 2,000; Referee: Daniel Misael Marin Quiroz |

==== Zone Semi-finals ====
The first legs were played on 10 May, and the second legs will be played on 13 anad 14 May 2023.

| Team 1 | Agg. | Team 2 | 1st leg | 2nd leg |
|---|---|---|---|---|
| Artesanos Metepec | 2–1 | Faraones de Texcoco | 2–0 | 0–1 |
| Aragón | 5–2 | Estudiantes de Atlacomulco | 3–2 | 2–0 |
| Poza Rica | (p) 3–3 (5–4) | Ayense | 1–2 | 2–1 |
| Aguacateros de Peribán | 4–1 | Lobos ITECA | 0–1 | 4–0 |

First leg

| 10 May 2023 | Estudiantes de Atlacomulco | 2–3 | Aragón | Atlacomulco, State of Mexico |
| 16:00 CST (UTC−6) | Navarrete 4', 38' | Report | Ríos 28', 77'; Espinosa 30' | Stadium: Estadio Municipal de Atlacomulco; Attendance: 450; Referee: Omar Alejandro Ortega García |

| 10 May 2023 | Faraones de Texcoco | 0–2 | Artesanos Metepec | Texcoco, State of Mexico |
| 16:00 CST (UTC−6) | | Report | García 9'; Ángeles 67' | Stadium: Estadio Municipal Claudio Suárez; Attendance: 8,500; Referee: Daniel Misael Marin Quiroz |

| 10 May 2023 | Lobos ITECA | 1–0 | Aguacateros de Peribán | San Luis de la Paz, Guanajuato |
| 16:00 CST (UTC−6) | Rangel 67' | Report | | Stadium: Estadio El Internado; Attendance: 800; Referee: Gerardo Yahir Mendoza Sánchez |

| 10 May 2023 | Ayense | 2–1 | Poza Rica | Ayotlán, Jalisco |
| 19:00 CST (UTC−6) | Del Río 4'; Medina 36' | Report | Rodríguez 55' | Stadium: Estadio Chino Rivas; Attendance: 5,000; Referee: Edwin Eduardo Morfín Verduzco |

Second leg

| 13 May 2023 | Aragón | 2–0 (5–2 agg.) | Estudiantes de Atlacomulco | Gustavo A. Madero, Mexico City |
| 11:00 CST (UTC−6) | Guerrero 44'; Espinosa 58' | Report | | Stadium: Deportivo Francisco Zarco; Attendance: 1,000; Referee: Keven Iván Pérez Mendoza |

| 13 May 2023 | Artesanos Metepec | 0–1 (2–1 agg.) | Faraones de Texcoco | Metepec, State of Mexico |
| 16:00 CST (UTC−6) | | Report | Flores 89' | Stadium: Unidad Deportiva Alarcón Hisojo "La Hortaliza"; Attendance: 2,050; Referee: Luis Ángel Cabrera Carbajal |

| 13 May 2023 | Aguacateros de Peribán | 4–0 (4–1 agg.) | Lobos ITECA | Peribán, Michoacán |
| 16:00 CST (UTC−6) | Cerda 12'; Cota 27', 68'; Barajas 45' | Report | | Stadium: Estadio Municipal de Peribán; Attendance: 1,500; Referee: Yoel Guzmán Hernández |

| 14 May 2023 (Note: The game started on 13 May at 16:00, but was stopped 20 minutes later due to a storm, later it was determined to resume the game on 14 May at 10:00) | Poza Rica | 2–1 (3–3 agg.) (5–4 p) | Ayense | Poza Rica, Veracruz |
| 10:00 CST (UTC−6) | Trejo 50'; Zamora 65' | Report | Medina 53' | Stadium: Estadio Heriberto Jara; Attendance: 7,000; Referee: Maximiliano Arias Guzmán |

==== Zone Finals ====
The first legs were played on 17 and 18 May, and the second legs were played on 20 and 21 May 2023.

| Team 1 | Agg. | Team 2 | 1st leg | 2nd leg |
|---|---|---|---|---|
| Artesanos Metepec | 0–1 | Aragón | 0–1 | 0–0 |
| Poza Rica | 0–5 | Aguacateros de Peribán | 0–2 | 0–3 |

First leg

| 17 May 2023 | Aragón | 1–0 | Artesanos Metepec | Gustavo A. Madero, Mexico City |
| 16:00 CST (UTC−6) | Hernández 66' | Report | | Stadium: Deportivo Francisco Zarco; Attendance: 1,000; Referee: Edwin Eduardo Morfín Verduzco |

| 18 May 2023 | Aguacateros de Peribán | 2–0 | Poza Rica | Peribán, Michoacán |
| 16:00 CST (UTC−6) | Cota 18'; Barajas 80' | Report | | Stadium: Estadio Municipal de Peribán; Attendance: 1,800; Referee: Daniel Misael Marin Quiroz |

Second leg

| 20 May 2023 | Artesanos Metepec | 0–0 (0–1 agg.) | Aragón | Metepec, State of Mexico |
| 15:00 CST (UTC−6) | | Report | | Stadium: Unidad Deportiva Alarcón Hisojo "La Hortaliza"; Attendance: 2,000; Referee: Omar Alejandro Ortega García |

| 21 May 2023 | Poza Rica | 0–3 (0–5 agg.) | Aguacateros de Peribán | Poza Rica, Veracruz |
| 12:00 CST (UTC−6) | | Report | Mendoza 52' (own); Vidales 63'; Tabarez 78' | Stadium: Estadio Heriberto Jara; Attendance: 8,500; Referee: Gerardo Yahir Mendoza Sánchez |

==== National Final ====
The match was played on 27 May 2023 at the Estadio Miguel Alemán Valdés, Celaya.

| Team 1 | Score | Team 2 |
|---|---|---|
| Aragón | 0–2 | Aguacateros de Peribán |

| 27 May 2023 | Aragón | 0–2 | Aguacateros de Peribán | Celaya, Guanajuato |
| 11:00 CST (UTC−6) | | Report | Pizano 66'; Barajas 73' | Stadium: Estadio Miguel Alemán Valdés; Attendance: 1,000; Referee: Luis Enrique Santander |

2022–23 winners

1st title

== 2022–23 Liga TDP Reserves Tournament ==
Each season a table is created among those teams that don't have the right to promote, because they are considered as reserve teams for teams that play in Liga MX, Liga de Expansión and Liga Premier or are independent teams that have requested not to participate for the Promotion due to the fact that they are footballers development projects. The ranking order is determined through the "quotient", which is obtained by dividing the points obtained between the disputed matches, being ordered from highest to lowest.

=== Table ===
| P | Team | Pts | G | Pts/G | GD |
|---|---|---|---|---|---|
| 1 | Toluca | 76 | 30 | 2.53 | +70 |
| 2 | Chihuahua | 48 | 20 | 2.40 | +30 |
| 3 | Deportiva Venados | 57 | 24 | 2.38 | +38 |
| 4 | Tecos | 46 | 22 | 2.09 | +15 |
| 5 | FuraMochis | 45 | 22 | 2.05 | +14 |
| 6 | Pachuca | 61 | 30 | 2.03 | +34 |
| 7 | Juárez | 51 | 26 | 1.96 | +26 |
| 8 | Necaxa | 42 | 22 | 1.91 | +18 |
| 9 | Dorados de Sinaloa | 42 | 22 | 1.91 | +7 |
| 10 | Dongu | 57 | 30 | 1.90 | +16 |
| 11 | Leones Negros UdeG | 40 | 22 | 1.82 | +16 |
| 12 | Alebrijes Teotihuacán | 52 | 30 | 1.73 | +17 |
| 13 | Mineros de Zacatecas | 38 | 22 | 1.73 | +15 |
| 14 | Cimarrones de Sonora | 34 | 20 | 1.70 | +18 |
| 15 | Atlante Xalapa | 38 | 24 | 1.58 | +1 |
| 16 | Correcaminos UAT | 41 | 26 | 1.58 | –2 |
| 17 | Coras | 34 | 22 | 1.55 | +8 |
| 18 | Halcones de Zapopan | 34 | 22 | 1.55 | +2 |
| 19 | Celaya | 37 | 24 | 1.54 | +5 |
| 20 | Mineros Querétaro | 34 | 24 | 1.42 | +6 |
| 21 | Xolos Hermosillo | 26 | 20 | 1.30 | –6 |
| 22 | Atlético Acaponeta | 28 | 22 | 1.27 | –6 |
| 23 | Inter de Querétaro | 30 | 24 | 1.25 | –14 |
| 24 | Cañoneros | 34 | 30 | 1.13 | –16 |
| 25 | Atlante Chalco | 33 | 30 | 1.10 | –12 |
| 26 | León GEN | 22 | 22 | 1.00 | –16 |
| 27 | Ciervos | 30 | 30 | 1.00 | –24 |
| 28 | Tigres SD | 24 | 26 | 0.92 | –12 |
| 29 | Cantera Venados | 22 | 24 | 0.92 | –21 |
| 30 | Alteños Acatic | 18 | 22 | 0.82 | –26 |
| 31 | Atlético Nayarit | 9 | 22 | 0.41 | –33 |
| 32 | Calor León | 8 | 22 | 0.36 | –77 |

Last updated: April 16, 2023
Source: Liga TDP
P = Position; G = Games played; Pts = Points; Pts/G = Ratio of points to games played; GD = Goal difference

=== Play–offs ===
Round of 16
4 | Tecos | 1 | 2 | 3
13 | Mineros de Zacatecas | 2 | 0 | 2
5 | FuraMochis | 1 | 2 | 3
12 | Alebrijes Teotihuacán | 0 | 1 | 1
3 | Deportiva Venados (w/o) | 0 | 0 | 1
14 | Cimarrones de Sonora | 0 | 0 | 0
6 | Pachuca | 1 | 4 | 5
11 | Leones Negros UdeG | 0 | 0 | 0
2 | Chihuahua | 2 | 4 | 6
15 | Atlante Xalapa | 0 | 0 | 0
7 | Juárez (w/o) | 1 | 0 | 1
10 | Dongu | 0 | 0 | 0
1 | Toluca | 1 | 2 | 3
16 | Correcaminos UAT | 1 | 0 | 1
8 | Necaxa (p.) | 0 | 1 | 1 (5)
9 | Dorados de Sinaloa | 1 | 0 | 1 (4)

Quarter–finals
4 | Tecos | 1 | 2 | 0
5 | FuraMochis | 0 | 0 | 0
3 | Deportiva Venados | 1 | 2 | 3
6 | Pachuca | 4 | 2 | 6
2 | Chihuahua | 1 | 3 | 4
7 | Juárez | 1 | 0 | 1
1 | Toluca | 0 | 0 | 0
8 | Necaxa | 0 | 1 | 1

Semi–finals
4 | Tecos | 0 | 0 | 0
6 | Pachuca | 2 | 1 | 3
2 | Chihuahua | 1 | 1 | 2
8 | Necaxa | 2 | 2 | 4

Final
6 | Pachuca | 2 | 3 | 5
8 | Necaxa | 1 | 0 | 1

==== Round of 16 ====
The first legs were played on 19 and 20 April, and the second legs were played on 22 and 23 April 2023.

| Team 1 | Agg. | Team 2 | 1st leg | 2nd leg |
|---|---|---|---|---|
| Toluca | 3–1 | Correcaminos UAT | 1–1 | 2–0 |
| Chihuahua | 6–0 | Atlante Xalapa | 2–0 | 4–0 |
| Deportiva Venados | (w/o) 1–0 | Cimarrones de Sonora | 0–0 | 1–0 |
| Tecos | 3–2 | Mineros de Zacatecas | 1–2 | 2–0 |
| FuraMochis | 3–1 | Alebrijes Teotihuacán | 1–0 | 2–1 |
| Pachuca | 5–0 | Leones Negros UdeG | 1–0 | 4–0 |
| Juárez | (w/o) 1–0 | Dongu | 1–0 | 0–0 |
| Necaxa | (p.) 1–1 (5–4) | Dorados de Sinaloa | 0–1 | 1–0 |

First leg

| 19 April 2023 | Mineros de Zacatecas | 2–1 | Tecos | Zacatecas City, Zacatecas |
| 10:00 CST (UTC−6) | Rodríguez 22'; Sotelo 54' | Report | Hernández 68' | Stadium: Estadio Carlos Vega Villalba; Attendance: 100; Referee: Erika Monserrat González Nevarez |

| 19 April 2023 | Cimarrones de Sonora | 0–0 | Deportiva Venados | Hermosillo, Sonora |
| 10:00 MST (UTC−7) | | Report | | Stadium: Unidad Deportiva La Milla; Attendance: 70; Referee: Karlo Geovanni Palmieres Corral |

| 19 April 2023 | Alebrijes Teotihuacán | 0–1 | FuraMochis | Teotihuacán, State of Mexico |
| 12:00 CST (UTC−6) | | Report | Gutiérrez 34' | Stadium: Estadio Municipal de Teotihuacán; Attendance: 200; Referee: Ximena Márquez Ruíz |

| 19 April 2023 | Correcaminos UAT | 1–1 | Toluca | Ciudad Victoria, Tamaulipas |
| 16:00 CST (UTC−6) | Urbina 45' | Report | Policarpio 16' | Stadium: Estadio Profesor Eugenio Alvizo Porras; Attendance: 400; Referee: José Carlos Meléndez Cansino |

| 20 April 2023 | Leones Negros UdeG | 0–1 | Pachuca | Zapopan, Jalisco |
| 10:00 CST (UTC−6) | | Report | Jiménez 32' | Stadium: Club Deportivo U. de G. Attendance: 150; Referee: Oscar Ochoa Quiñonez |

| 20 April 2023 | Dorados de Sinaloa | 1–0 | Necaxa | Culiacán, Sinaloa |
| 10:00 MST (UTC−7) | Quintero 75' | Report | | Stadium: Estadio Dorados; Attendance: 150; Referee: Juan David Valdez Mora |

| 20 April 2023 | Atlante Xalapa | 0–2 | Chihuahua | Xalapa, Veracruz |
| 14:00 CST (UTC−6) | | Report | Grijalva 25'; Acosta 40' | Stadium: Unidad Deportiva UV Cultura, Artes y Deporte; Attendance: 200; Referee: Fermín Izquierdo Paz |

Second leg

| 22 April 2023 | Tecos | 2–0 (3–2 agg.) | Mineros de Zacatecas | Zapopan, Jalisco |
| 10:00 CST (UTC−6) | Mendoza 19'; Cabral 48' | Report | | Stadium: Cancha Anexa Tres de Marzo |

| 22 April 2023 | Deportiva Venados | 1–0 (1–0 agg.) | Cimarrones de Sonora | Tamanché, Yucatán |
| 15:00 CST (UTC−6) | | | | Stadium: Estadio Alonso Diego Molina |

| 22 April 2023 | Toluca | 2–0 (3–1 agg.) | Correcaminos UAT | Metepec, State of Mexico |
| 15:00 CST (UTC−6) | Rojas 5', 72' | Report | | Stadium: Instalaciones de Metepec Cancha 2 Attendance: 120; Referee: José Andrés Elías Zarzoza |

| 22 April 2023 | FuraMochis | 2–1 (3–1 agg.) | Alebrijes Teotihuacán | Los Mochis, Sinaloa |
| 15:00 MST (UTC−7) | Gutiérrez 26'; Payares 70' | Report | Alvarado 49' | Stadium: Club FuraMochis; Attendance: 300; Referee: Edwin Eduardo Morfín Verduzco |

| 23 April 2023 | Pachuca | 4–0 (5–0 agg.) | Leones Negros UdeG | San Agustín Tlaxiaca, Hidalgo |
| 10:00 CST (UTC−6) | González 15'; Aguayo 19'; Jiménez 26'; Gámez 43' | Report | | Stadium: Universidad del Fútbol; Attendance: 100; Referee: Daniel Misael Marin Quiroz |

| 23 April 2023 | Necaxa | 1–0 (1–1 agg.) (5–4 p) | Dorados de Sinaloa | Aguascalientes City, Aguascalientes |
| 10:00 CST (UTC−6) | Burgos 29' | Report | | Stadium: Estadio Victoria; Attendance: 50; Referee: Jesús Antonio Reyes Gutierrez |

| 23 April 2023 | Chihuahua | 4–0 (6–0 agg.) | Atlante Xalapa | Chihuahua City, Chihuahua |
| 10:00 CST (UTC−6) | Acosta 11'; López 30' (own); Balderrama 47'; Rivera 85' | Report | | Stadium: Estadio Olímpico Universitario José Reyes Baeza; Attendance: 200; Referee: Luis Fernando Orosco Escalante |

==== Quarter–finals ====
The first legs were played on 26 and 27 April, and the second legs were played on 29 and 30 April 2023.

| Team 1 | Agg. | Team 2 | 1st leg | 2nd leg |
|---|---|---|---|---|
| Toluca | 0–1 | Necaxa | 0–0 | 0–1 |
| Chihuahua | 4–1 | Juárez | 1–1 | 3–0 |
| Deportiva Venados | 3–6 | Pachuca | 1–4 | 2–2 |
| Tecos | 3–0 | FuraMochis | 1–0 | 2–0 |

First leg

| 26 April 2023 | Necaxa | 0–0 | Toluca | Aguascalientes City, Aguascalientes |
| 10:00 CST (UTC−6) | | Report | | Stadium: Estadio Victoria; Attendance: 50; Referee: Antonio Toca Varela |

| 26 April 2023 | Pachuca | 4–1 | Deportiva Venados | San Agustín Tlaxiaca, Hidalgo |
| 10:00 CST (UTC−6) | Aguayo 13'; Mustre 74'; Palma 90'; Vilchis 90' | Report | Maya 75' | Stadium: Universidad del Fútbol; Attendance: 120; Referee: José Luis Medina Oliveros |

| 26 April 2023 | FuraMochis | 0–1 | Tecos | Los Mochis, Sinaloa |
| 15:00 MST (UTC−7) | | Report | Cabral 75' | Stadium: Club FuraMochis; Attendance: 300; Referee: Juan David Valdez Mora |

| 27 April 2023 | Juárez | 1–1 | Chihuahua | Milpa Alta, Mexico City |
| 17:00 CST (UTC−6) | López 15' | Report | Ríos 62' | Stadium: Estadio Momoxco; Attendance: 50; Referee: Yoel Guzmán Hernández |

Second leg

| 29 April 2023 | Tecos | 2–0 (3–0 agg.) | FuraMochis | Zapopan, Jalisco |
| 10:00 CST (UTC−6) | Mendoza 18', 77' | Report | | Stadium: Cancha Anexa Tres de Marzo; Attendance: 300; Referee: José Carlos Meléndez Cansino |

| 29 April 2023 | Deportiva Venados | 2–2 (3–6 agg.) | Pachuca | Tamanché, Yucatán |
| 15:00 CST (UTC−6) | Escobar 30'; Torres 89' | Report | Martínez 51'; Mustre 79' | Stadium: Estadio Alonso Diego Molina; Attendance: 100; Referee: Ángel Emmanuel Alzaga Esquivel |

| 29 April 2023 | Toluca | 0–1 (0–1 agg.) | Necaxa | Metepec, State of Mexico |
| 15:00 CST (UTC−6) | | Report | Cortés 47' | Stadium: Instalaciones de Metepec Cancha 2 Attendance: 100; Referee: Hazael Aldair Pérez Corte |

| 30 April 2023 | Chihuahua | 3–0 (4–1 agg.) | Juárez | Chihuahua City, Chihuahua |
| 10:00 CST (UTC−6) | Grijalva 32'; Rivera 67'; Valenzuela 75' | Report | | Stadium: Estadio Olímpico Universitario José Reyes Baeza; Attendance: 400; Referee: Jesús Emmanuel Rosales Perales |

==== Semi–finals ====
The first legs were played on 3 and 4 May, and the second legs were played on 6 and 7 May 2023.

| Team 1 | Agg. | Team 2 | 1st leg | 2nd leg |
|---|---|---|---|---|
| Chihuahua | 2–4 | Necaxa | 1–2 | 1–2 |
| Tecos | 0–3 | Pachuca | 0–2 | 0–1 |

First leg

| 3 May 2023 | Pachuca | 2–0 | Tecos | San Agustín Tlaxiaca, Hidalgo |
| 10:00 CST (UTC−6) | Mustre 29'; González 48' | Report | | Stadium: Universidad del Fútbol; Attendance: 200; Referee: Walter Peñaloza Urbina |

| 4 May 2023 | Necaxa | 2–1 | Chihuahua | Aguascalientes City, Aguascalientes |
| 10:00 CST (UTC−6) | Ruiz 8', 32' | Report | Acosta 86' | Stadium: Estadio Victoria; Attendance: 100; Referee: Daniel Sinue García Sánchez |

Second leg

| 6 May 2023 | Tecos | 0–1 (0–3 agg.) | Pachuca | Zapopan, Jalisco |
| 10:00 CST (UTC−6) | | Report | Berlanga 12' | Stadium: Cancha Anexa Tres de Marzo; Attendance: 200; Referee: Jesús Gibrán Araujo Ruiz |

| 7 May 2023 | Chihuahua | 1–2 (2–4 agg.) | Necaxa | Chihuahua City, Chihuahua |
| 10:00 CST (UTC−6) | Haro 50' | Report | Mojica 19'; Burgos 36' | Stadium: Estadio Olímpico Universitario José Reyes Baeza; Attendance: 1,000; Referee: Jesús Emmanuel Rosales Perales |

==== Final ====
The first leg was played on 10 May, and the second leg was played on 13 May 2023.

| Team 1 | Agg. | Team 2 | 1st leg | 2nd leg |
|---|---|---|---|---|
| Pachuca | 5–1 | Necaxa | 2–1 | 3–0 |

First leg

| 10 May 2023 | Necaxa | 1–2 | Pachuca | Aguascalientes City, Aguascalientes |
| 17:00 CST (UTC−6) | González 14' | Report | Mustre 18'; Aguayo 83' | Stadium: Estadio Victoria; Attendance: 300; Referee: Daniel Sinue García Sánchez |

Second leg

| 13 May 2023 | Pachuca | 3–0 (5–1 agg.) | Necaxa | Pachuca, Hidalgo |
| 18:00 CST (UTC−6) | González 7', 16'; Gámez 60' | Report | | Stadium: Estadio Hidalgo; Attendance: 1,000; Referee: Figo Rodolfo López Valle |

Champions (Filiales)

1st title

== Regular season statistics ==
=== Top goalscorers ===
Players sorted first by goals scored, then by last name.

| Rank | Player | Club | Goals |
|---|---|---|---|
| 1 | (Mexico) Edson Cibrián | CDM | 40 |
| 2 | (Mexico) Daniel Ramos | Halcones Negros | 39 |
| 3 | (Mexico) Yefte Espinoza | Aragón | 33 |
| 4 | (Mexico) Juan Luis Flores | Águilas UAGro | 27 |
| 5 | (Mexico) Oliver Cabrera | Atlético Pachuca | 23 |
| 5 | (Mexico) José Maciel | Atlético ECCA | 23 |
| 7 | (Mexico) Jonathan Hernández | Matamoros | 22 |
| 8 | (Mexico) Anibal Marín | Lobos ITECA | 21 |
| 8 | (Mexico) Yael Valdez | CDM | 21 |
| 8 | (Mexico) Carlos Vargas | Atlético Leonés | 21 |

Source:Liga TDP
