= Liga MXA Independiente =

Mexican football league

- Founded: 2013; 13 years ago
- Country: Mexico

Liga MXA Independiente is a Mexican semi-professional football league. Established in 2013, it began as a local league in Fresnillo, Zacatecas, before growing into a nationwide competition with multiple divisions. It is not affiliated with the Mexican Football Federation, but rather the Mexican Semiprofessional Football Federation.

Liga MX Independiente has served both as a hotbed for developing young talent and as a destination for retired professional footballers. It also runs a women's league and an under-19 league.

== History ==
The Liga de Fútbol MXA Independiente was created in 2013 in Fresnillo, Zacatecas, and originally operated at the municipal level. It then grew to the state level; at one point, there were teams based in 54 out of the 58 municipalities of Zacatecas. The league started adding teams from neighboring states soon thereafter until eventually becoming a national competition. As of 2018, there were teams in 32 states.

In 2021, Liga MXA Independiente created a new first-tier league called the Liga Élite, which was aimed more towards professionalism. Eight teams were chosen based on their "structure and economic solvency", with two spots reserved for the champions in the top two tiers of the Liga MXA's existing league structure. The teams were Carranzos, Estudiantes de Morelia, Fundición Santa Rosa, Jaguares de Saltillo, Metropolitan Monterrey, Nicolás Romero, Obson Dynamo, and Ostioneros de Guaymas.

In January 2022, Gregorio Cruz Martínez, the municipal president of Axtla de Terrazas, made an appearance as one of three designated overage players on the CPTIF GP Axtla under-21 squad.

== Competition format ==
As of 2018, 40-minute halves are played and five substitutions were allowed. A liguilla (Spanish for "little league") playoff tournament is played at the end of the season.

== Notable players ==
- Everaldo Barbosa
- Jaime Correa
- Daniel Ludueña
- Alberto Medina
- José de Jesús Mosqueda
- José Arturo Rivas
- Rodrigo Ruiz
- Sergio Santana
