= Metepec =

- Municipality and City
- Municipio de Metepec
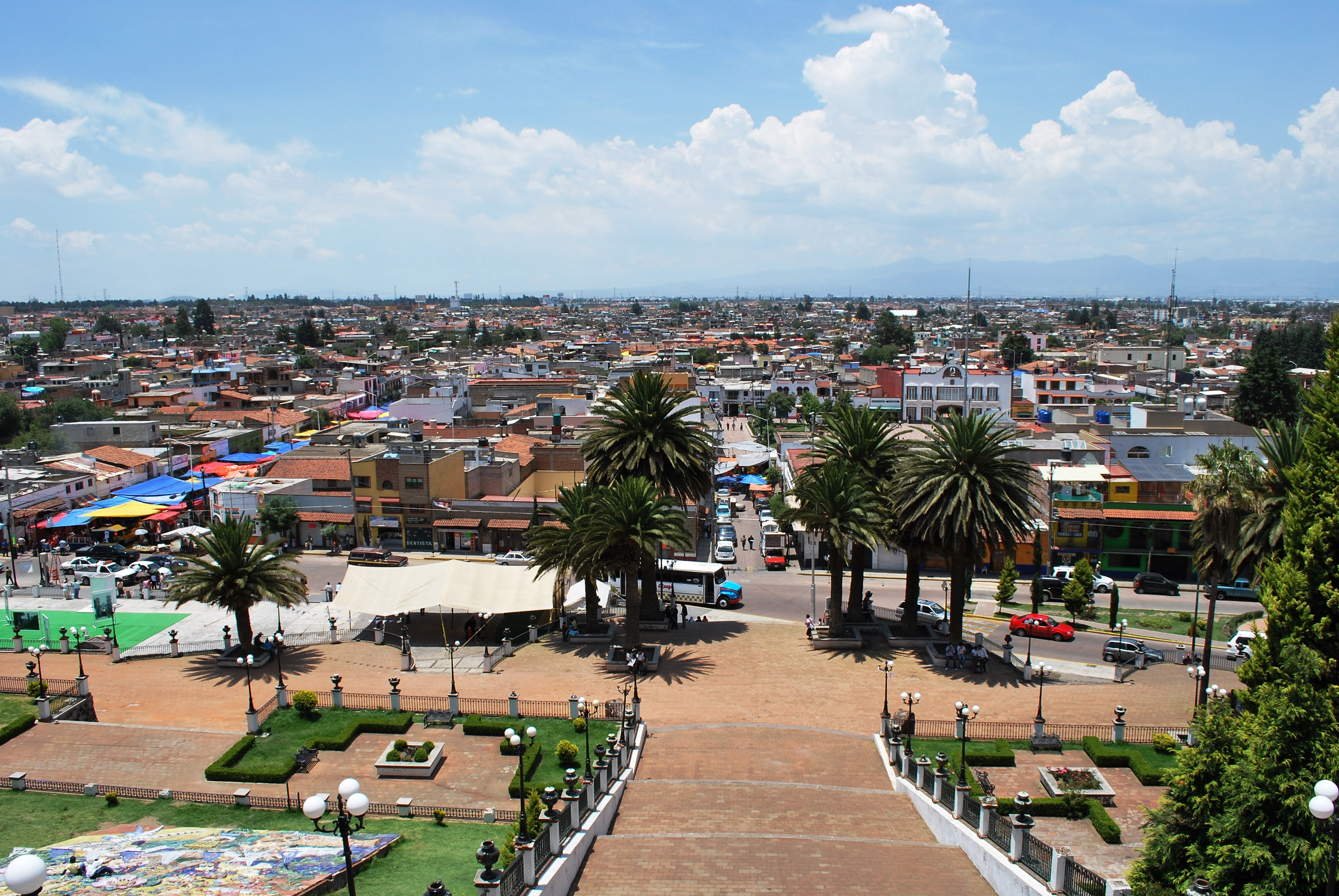
- Panoramic view of Metepec

- Coat of arms

- Location within Mexico
- Coordinates: 19°15′04″N 99°36′17″W
- Country: Mexico
- State: State of Mexico
- Founded: 1526
- Municipal Status: 1848

Government
  - Municipal President: Fernando Gustavo Flores Fernández

Area
  - Municipality: 70.43 km^{2} (27.19 sq mi)
- Elevation (of seat): 2,620 m (8,600 ft)

Population (2020) Municipality
  - Municipality: 242,307
  - Seat: 164,182
- Time zone: UTC-6 (Central)
- Postal code (of seat): 52140
- Website: www.metepec.gob.mx (in Spanish)

Metepec (Spanish: [meteˈpek]) is a municipality in the State of Mexico in Mexico and is located directly to the east of the state capital, Toluca, at an altitude of 2,635 metres (8,645 ft) above sea level. The center of Mexico City lies some 50 km further to the east. The city of Metepec also form part of the Greater Toluca. The name Metepec comes from Náhuatl meaning hill of the agave plants. However, it is also known in the Matlatzinca language as "Nepinta-Tuhi" meaning 'people of corn land' and in the Otomi language as "Ntaguada".

== The city ==
The city center lies at the foot of the hill that gives the city and municipality its name. There has been a community here since the Otomis and Matlatzincas settled in this part of the Valley of Toluca: the Matlatzincas reached their cultural peak between AD 1120 and 1450 as part of the Teotihuacan culture. The Aztecs conquered this community, along with the rest of the area by AD 1470 by the tlatoani (chief) named Axáyacatl. The Spanish arrived here in AD 1526, building a church on the "maguey hill", now-called the Ex-convento de San Juan. The Spanish renamed the area San Juan Bautista Metepec. According to the Codex of Metepec, the Spanish town was founded in the same year.

The Ex-convento de San Juan is the main religious structure in the town and dates from the 16th century; however, other churches worth visiting include Las Capillas de El Calvario, La Santa Cruz, del Espíritu Santo, San Bartolomé, de San Salvador, de Santa María Magdalena and la Parroquia de San Mateo. The 24th of June is the feast day of Metepec's patron saint, John the Baptist. Additionally, since 1990 the city has an international arts and culture festival called Quimera, which occurs in October.

The Cerro de Maguey (Maguey Hill) has a number of small caves with names like "La cueva del diablo" (The Devil's Cave) that can be explored. While most of the food in Metepec is typical of the region (with dishes such as barbacoa, tamales, and huaraches) it does have a unique drink called "Garañona". It is made from 15 herbs and is a strong, sweet drink. The only place that sells and distributes this drink is a bar called the "2 de Abril", located in the city centre.

=== Economic activities ===
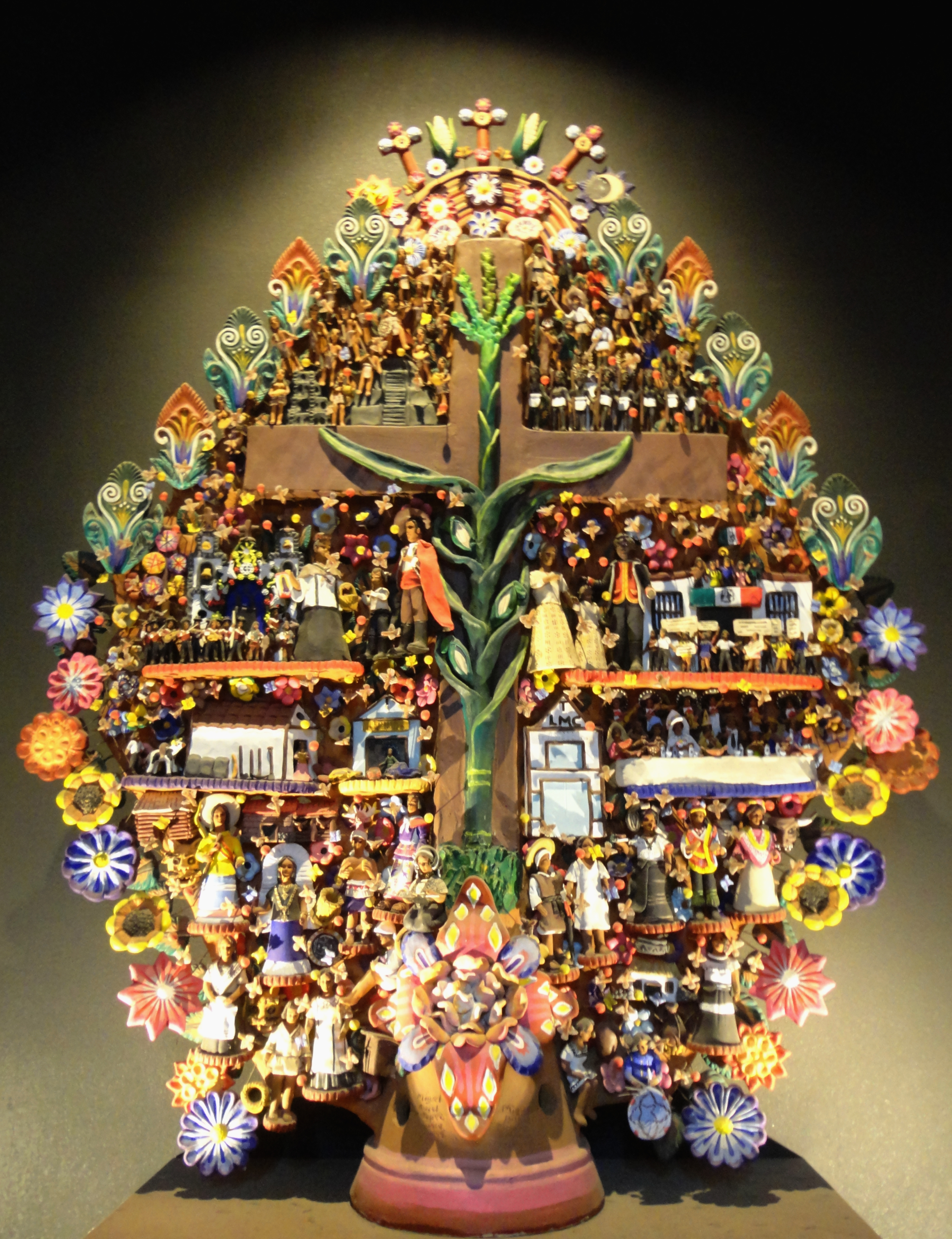
Arbol de la Vida, handcraft.

Metepec is known for its pottery items and it is still of economic importance. The artisans of this area have organized into the Asociación de Artesanos de Metepec y la Unión de Alfareros de Metepec, A.C. (Association of Artisans of Metepec and the Union of Potters of Metepec). Principal crafts include objects made from clay, glass and includes saddlemaking. The city has about 300 craftsmen as well as 275 family workshops. The craft Metepec is best known for is the Arbol de la vida ("Tree of Life") which is a traditional pottery representation of the tree from which Adam and Eve ate in the Biblical story. Monday is market day in the city centre, called plaza, where merchants go to sell fruit, vegetables and even a few electronic items. In recent years, the municipality has increased its economic importance with the construction of shopping malls, commercial plazas and automobile agencies etc.

According to INEGI 2005 census figures, the city had a population of 164,182, while the municipality had a population of 206,005 inhabitants. The municipality covers an area of 70.43 km^{2} (27.19 sq mi) and includes several smaller communities besides Metepec. Most commercial activity occurs in the city of Metepec proper and has grown considerably in the past years, along with its population.

== The Municipality ==
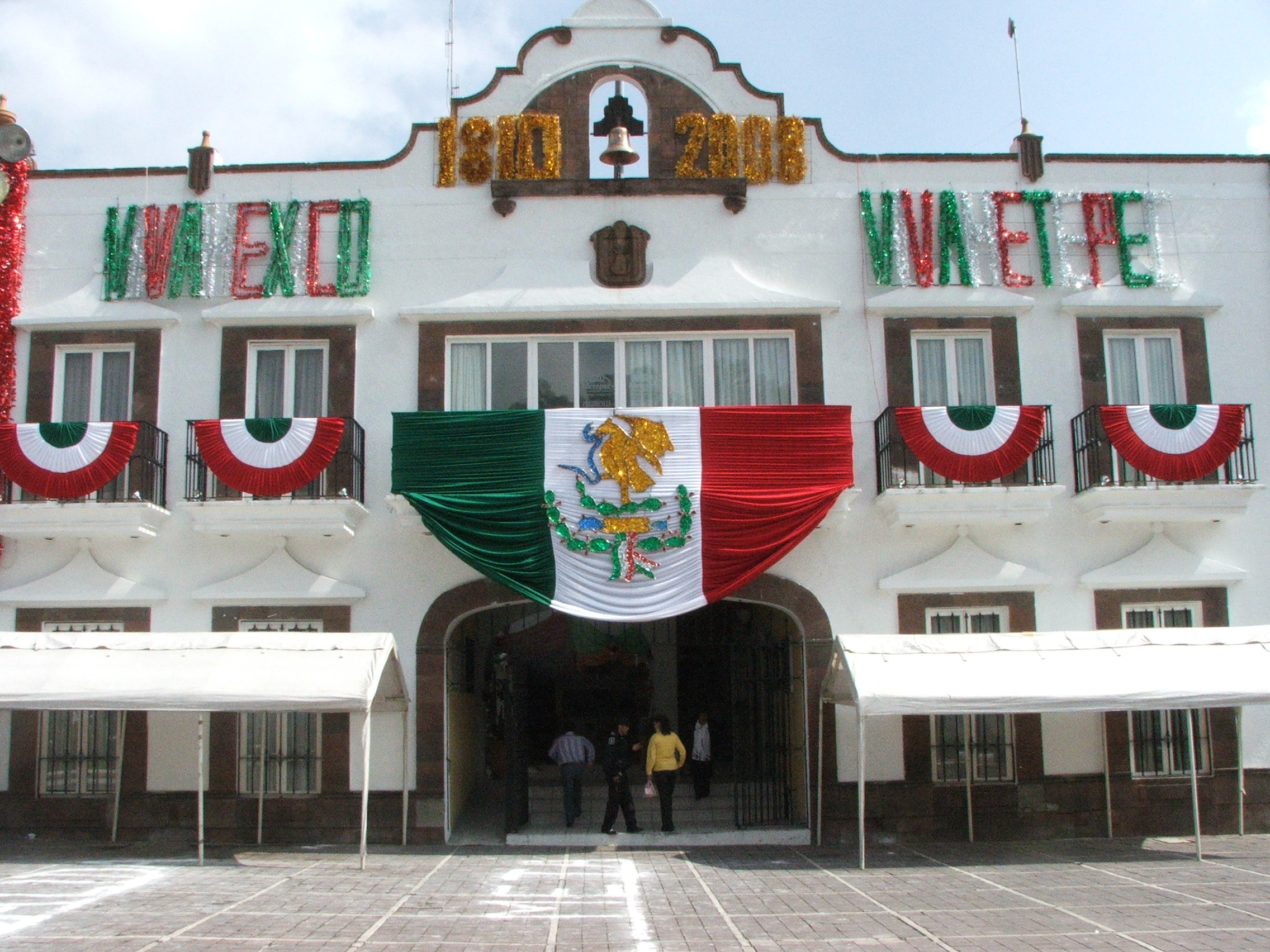
Municipal Headquarters, Metepec

As municipal seat, the city of Metepec has governing jurisdiction over the following communities: Barrio Santiaguito, Colonia Álvaro Obregón, Colonia Llano Grande (El Salitre), Rancho el Carmen Progreso, San Bartolomé Tlaltelulco, San Gaspar Tlahuelilpan, San Lorenzo Coacalco (San Lorenzo), San Lucas Tunco (San Lucas), San Miguel Totocuitlapilco, San Sebastián, Santa María Magdalena Ocotitlán, and Tepoluli.

The municipality borders with the municipalities of San Mateo Atenco, Santiago Tianguistenco, Toluca, Chapultepec, Mexicaltzingo and Calimaya and has a territory of 70.43 square kilometers. Due to its altitude, average temperatures here vary between 14 and 30 °C with cold spells down to -5 °C that can occur as late as March or April.

=== Economic activities ===
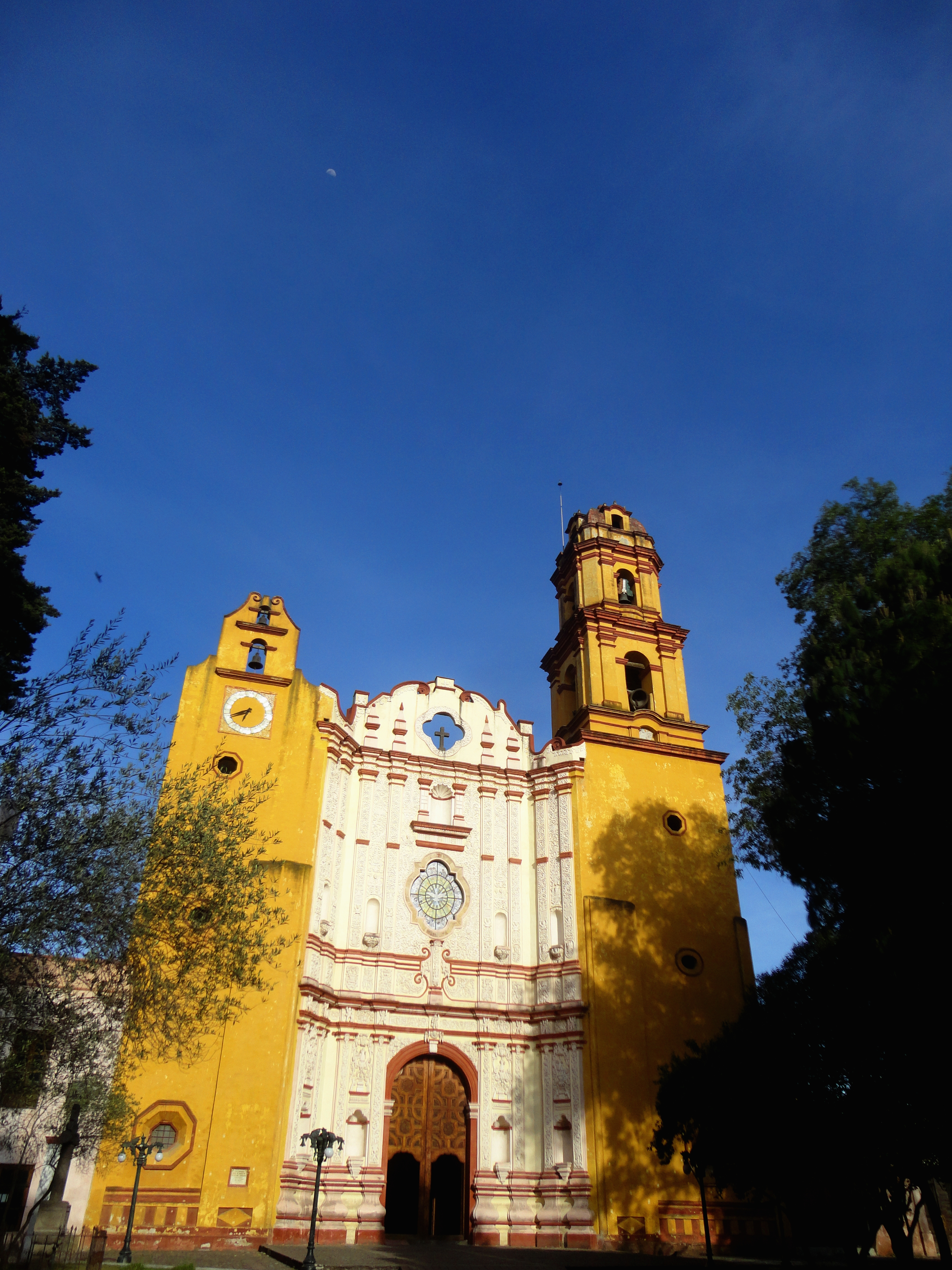
San Juan Bautista Parish.

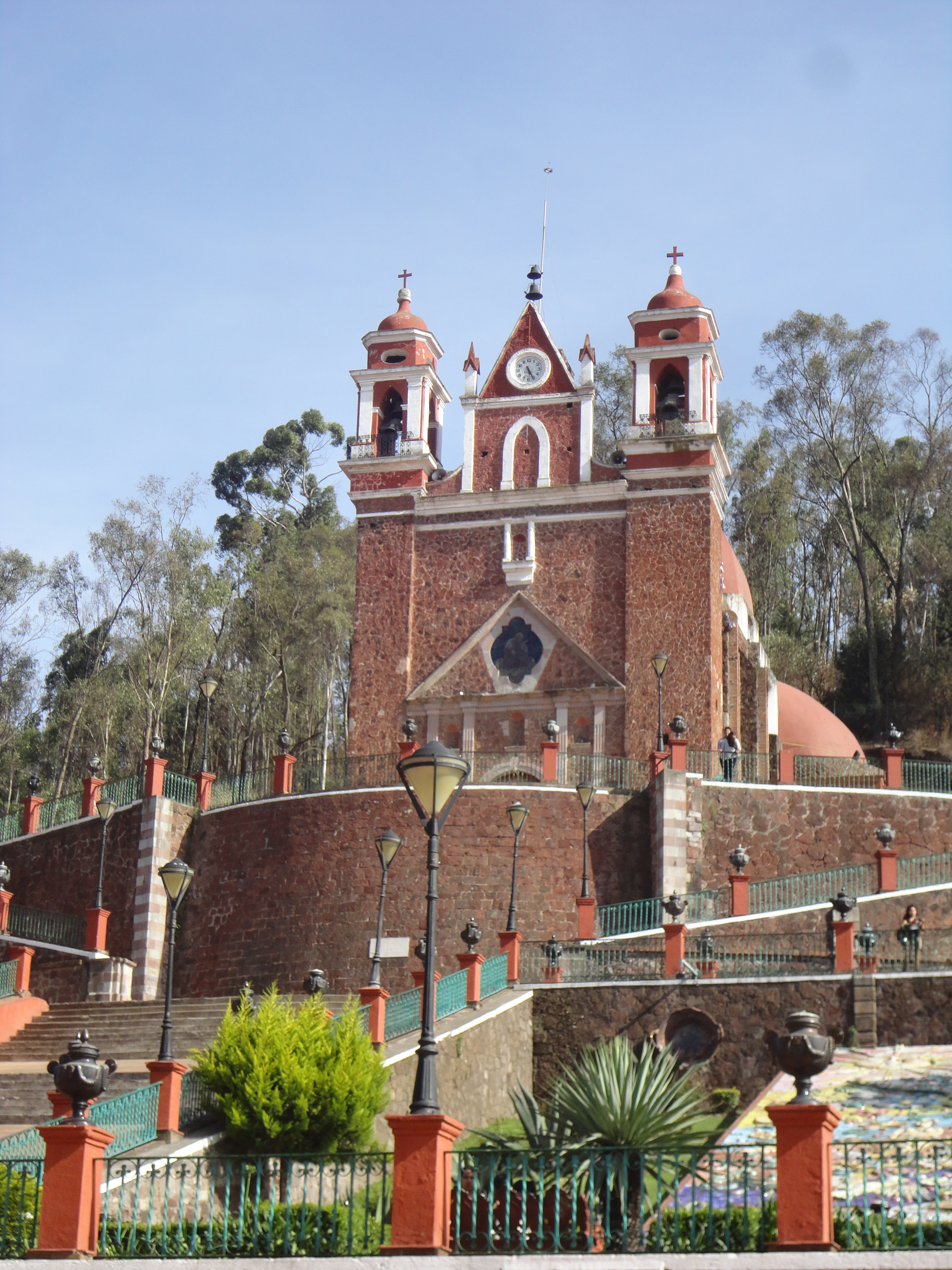
El Calvario Chapel.

Outside of the city of Metepec, the main economic activity is still agriculture, with 5,271.59 hectares devoted to crops. Fish farms comprise 208.18 hectares, with urban areas totaling only 1,193.16 hectares. Livestock raising includes cattle, sheep, pigs, horses, goats, rabbits and various fowl such as turkeys and chickens. Most is raised for autoconsumption and for nearby localities. However, industrial activities have grown in importance with enterprises dedicated to food-processing, bottling, tobacco, clothing, paper products, construction materials, as well as machinery and other equipment.

=== History ===
During the Spanish Conquest, Gonzálo de Sandoval and his Otomi allies, conquered Toluca, Tenango, Tlacotepec, Tecaxic-Calixtlahuaca, Calimaya along with Metepec and other Matlatzinca and Mexica population centers, whose lands were then abandoned by the natives. These lands were then redistributed among the Spaniards who participated in the Conquest and to those local chiefs that supported the Spanish. Lands in and around Metepec were given to Captain Juan Gutiérrez Altamirano, who brought the Franciscans in to evangelize the area, and then these lands passed on to form the estates of the Counts of Santiago. The area was considered an "alcaldía mayor" (literally 'major mayorship') by 1560 with the village of Metepec as its seat. Records of municipal government transactions begin in the 19th century. Finally, the municipality of Metepec was created in 1821; although this was not ratified by the government of the State of Mexico until 1827.

== Education ==
Private schools include:

- Instituto Universitario Verdad y Ciencia
- Instituto Cumbres
- Colegio Nuevo Continente - Campus Metepec
- Universidad del Valle de Mexico Campus Toluca
- Instituto Cenca S.C.
- Universidad Autónoma del Estado de México
- Instituto Tecnológico de Toluca
- Instituto Tecnológico de Estudios Superiores de Monterrey (Campus Estado de México)
- Instituto Tecnológico de Estudios Superiores de Monterrey (PrepaTec Metepec)
- Colegio Argos
- Colegio Aristos
- Colegio Buena Tierra
- Liceo del Valle de Toluca

== In popular culture ==
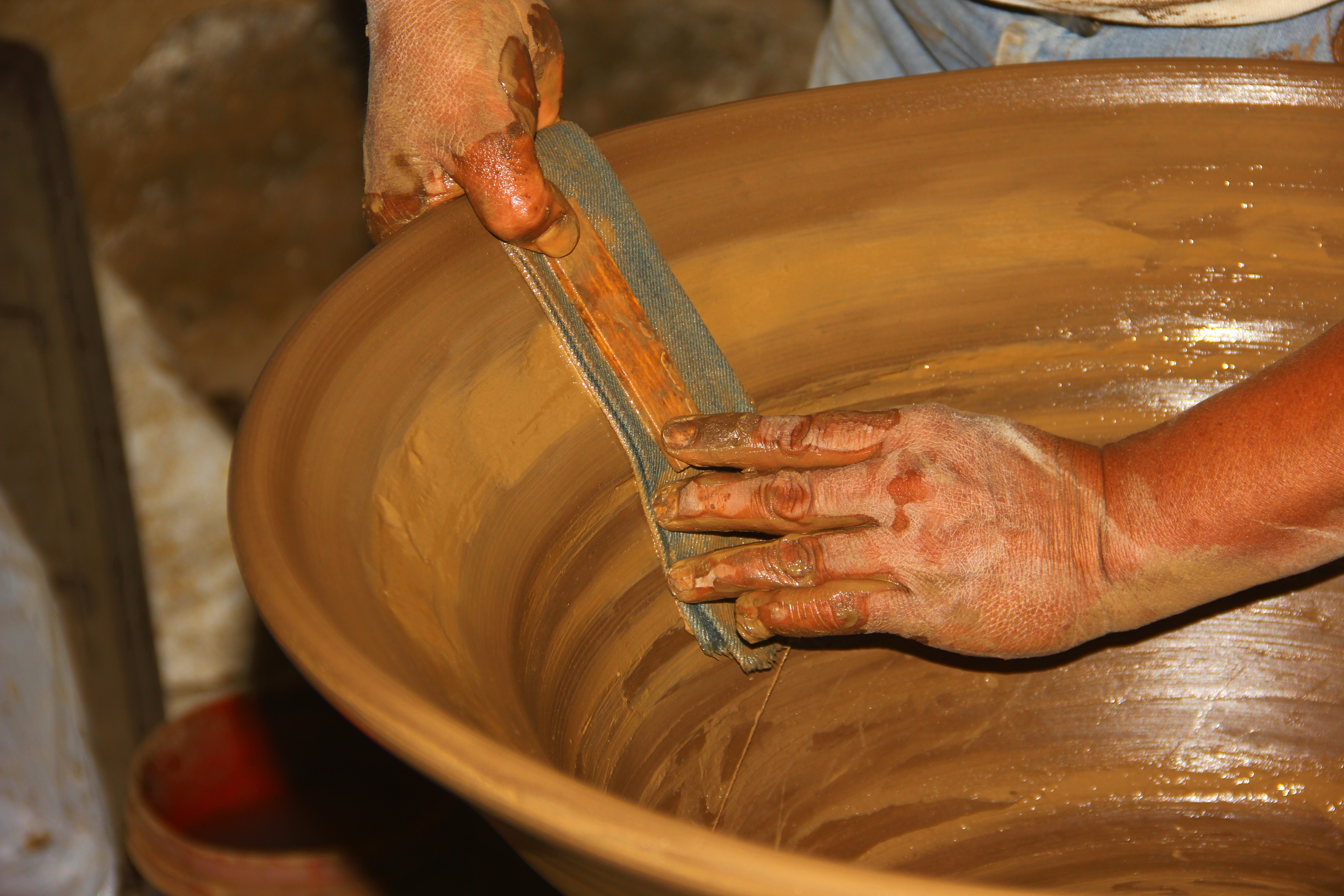
Artisan working in his pottery.

The original village of Metepec regards the Tree of Life as representative of this municipality and some local workshops still produce this brightly painted pottery artifact. The album cover of the Beatles' 1967 record Sgt. Pepper's Lonely Hearts Club Band features a Metepec Tree of Life.

== Sister Cities ==
Metepec is twinned with:

- Tlaquepaque, Jalisco, Mexico
- Villanueva de la Cañada, Madrid, Spain
- Trujillo, La Libertad, Peru
- San Carlos, California, USA
