= Obson Dynamo F.C. =

- Full name: Obson Dynamo Fútbol Club
- Founded: 2020
- Ground: Campo Hundido ITSON; Ciudad Obregón, Sonora, Mexico
- Capacity: 3,000
- President: José Miguel Fisher Castell
- League: Liga TDP – Group XVII
- 2022–23: 9th – Group XVII
Home colours

Obson Dynamo F.C. is a Mexican football club that plays in the Liga TDP. It is based in Ciudad Obregón, Sonora.

== History ==
=== Liga MXA Independiente ===
In 2020, Obson Dynamo joined the third division of the Liga MXA Independiente, a semiprofessional league, with Benjamín Valenzuela Dennis as their manager. José Miguel Fisher Castell was the team president. In their competitive debut in December, they defeated Iguanas FC de Los Mochis by a score of 19–0, with nine different players getting on the scoresheet. Obson Dynamo developed a rivalry with Cócorit FC, which was dubbed El clásico de Cajeme, as both teams were based in the municipality of Cajeme. Their first encounter resulted in a 3–2 Cócorit victory. Obson Dynamo lost again to Cócorit, this time by a 3–1 score, in the final game of the regular season.

In their first season, Obson Dynamo was one of eight clubs that qualified for the Liguilla, the end-of-season tournament. They defeated MGV de Monterrey in the quarterfinals by a score of 4–0, with Julián Duarte scoring a brace. However, Obson Dynamo was defeated 1–0 by their rivals, Cócorit, in the semifinals.

Obson Dynamo was then invited to play in the Liga Élite, a newly created first-tier league organized by the Liga MXA Independiente. They were one of eight teams chosen based on their "structure and economic solvency", with two spots reserved for the champions in the top two tiers of the Liga MXA's existing league structure. Obson Dynamo signed the reigning Liga MXA most valuable player, José Luis Rodríguez, in preparation for the competition. They beat the Jaguares de Saltillo 4–0 in their Liga Élite debut, with Rodríguez scoring a brace.

While still playing in the Liga Élite, Obson Dynamo began their regular season in the Liga de Ascenso MXA Independiente. In the Clausura 2021 season, Obson Dynamo won the Liga de Ascenso title, defeating Toros Retro 3–1 in the final at home.

=== Liga TDP (2022–present) ===
In July 2021, Obson Dynamo announced its intention to make the jump to the professional ranks and join the third-tier Liga TDP the following year. The last team from Ciudad Obregón to play in the league, Guerreros de Obregón, disappeared in 2017.

Ahead of their first season in 2022–23, Obson Dynamo were placed in Group XVII, consisting of teams from Baja California, Chihuahua and Sonora. The squad was made up of 25 local players, ranging from ages 16 to 20. In their league debut, they suffered a 1–0 defeat to Cobras Fut Premier. It was not until their fourth match, a 1–1 draw with Chihuahua, that Francisco "Tomatero" Valenzuela scored Obson Dynamo's first professional goal and the team earned its first points in Liga TDP. Even then, they lost a penalty shootout following regulation time, which was mandated due to league rules, earning one point while Chihuahua earned two.

On 1 October 2022, Obson Dynamo defeated Cimarrones de Sonora III by a score of 3–0 for their first victory at the professional level. They finished the season ninth in their group with a record of five wins, five draws and 10 losses.

== Stadium ==
Obson Dynamo F.C. plays its home matches at Campo Hundido ITSON, a football stadium located at the ITSON Unidad Deportiva in Ciudad Obregón. The stadium is located on the grounds of the main campus of the Sonora Institute of Technology and has a capacity of 3,000 people.

The team previously played at the Estadio Manuel "Piri" Sagasta.

== Women's team ==
The club's women's team was created in the fall of 2020. In their debut in the Liga Femenil de Futbol Independiente MXA, the team suffered a 3–1 defeat to Jimper at home and Daniela Pablos scored their first goal. In their next match, Obson Dynamo beat Guasave by a score of 11–0 for their first competitive victory. They finished in first place in the regular season and qualified for the post-season Liguilla tournament. They defeated the Ostioneras de Guaymas 8–1 in the quarterfinals, with four goals from Sarah Arce. In the semifinals, the Obson Dynamo women defeated Altamira 5–3 as Arce netted a hat-trick.

Obson Dynamo beat Lomas de Victoria 1–0 in the final to capture the league title; Naomi Valenzuela scored the lone goal. Arce, their 16-year-old forward, was the league's top scorer while team goalkeeper Yamileth Rodríguez was named the goalkeeper of the year. The championship win earned Obson Dynamo qualification to the Copa Latinoamericana, an international club competition featuring semiprofessional squads from Colombia, Argentina and Paraguay.

== Youth teams ==
In May 2021, Obson Dynamo established its youth sections and held tryouts at the under-15 and under-17 levels.

The under-17 team won the Apertura 2021 league title, defeating Atlético Nuevo León in the final on a 4–3 aggregate score.

== Players ==
=== First-team squad ===
As of 23 June 2023

Note: Flags indicate national team as defined under FIFA eligibility rules; some limited exceptions apply. Players may hold more than one non-FIFA nationality.

No.	Pos.	Nation	Player
1	GK	MEX	German Lugo
3	DF	MEX	Gabriel Durand
4	DF	MEX	Jesús Pazos
5	DF	MEX	Luis Arizmendiz
6	DF	MEX	Jared Flores
7	MF	MEX	Christian Villa
8	MF	MEX	Francisco Meza
9	FW	MEX	Jurgeen Rodríguez
10	FW	MEX	Francisco Valenzuela
12	DF	MEX	Diego Encinas
13	DF	MEX	Kevin Acosta
14	DF	MEX	Christian Estrada
15	DF	MEX	Luis Hernández

No.	Pos.	Nation	Player
16	FW	MEX	Gabriel Fonseca
19	MF	MEX	Bryan Angüis
21	MF	MEX	Angel Benitez
23	MF	MEX	Víctor Gutiérrez
24	MF	MEX	Juan Marini
25	MF	MEX	Diego Córdova
26	MF	MEX	Juan Serrano
27	MF	MEX	Alan Lara
28	DF	MEX	Francisco Flores
29	FW	MEX	Miguel López
31	MF	MEX	Gibrán Ortega
33	DF	MEX	Brayhan Ruiz
34	GK	MEX	Yosgart Sánchez

== Honours ==
=== Men's team ===
- Liga de Ascenso MXA Independiente
  - Winners: Apertura 2021

=== Women's team ===
- Liga Femenil Independiente MXA
  - Winners: Clausura 2021

=== Under-17 team ===
- Liga MXA Independiente
  - Winners: Apertura 2021

== Manager ==
- Benjamín Valenzuela Dennis (2020–2021)
- Fabián Amaya Beltrán (2022–2023)
