= San Miguel Totocuitlapilco =

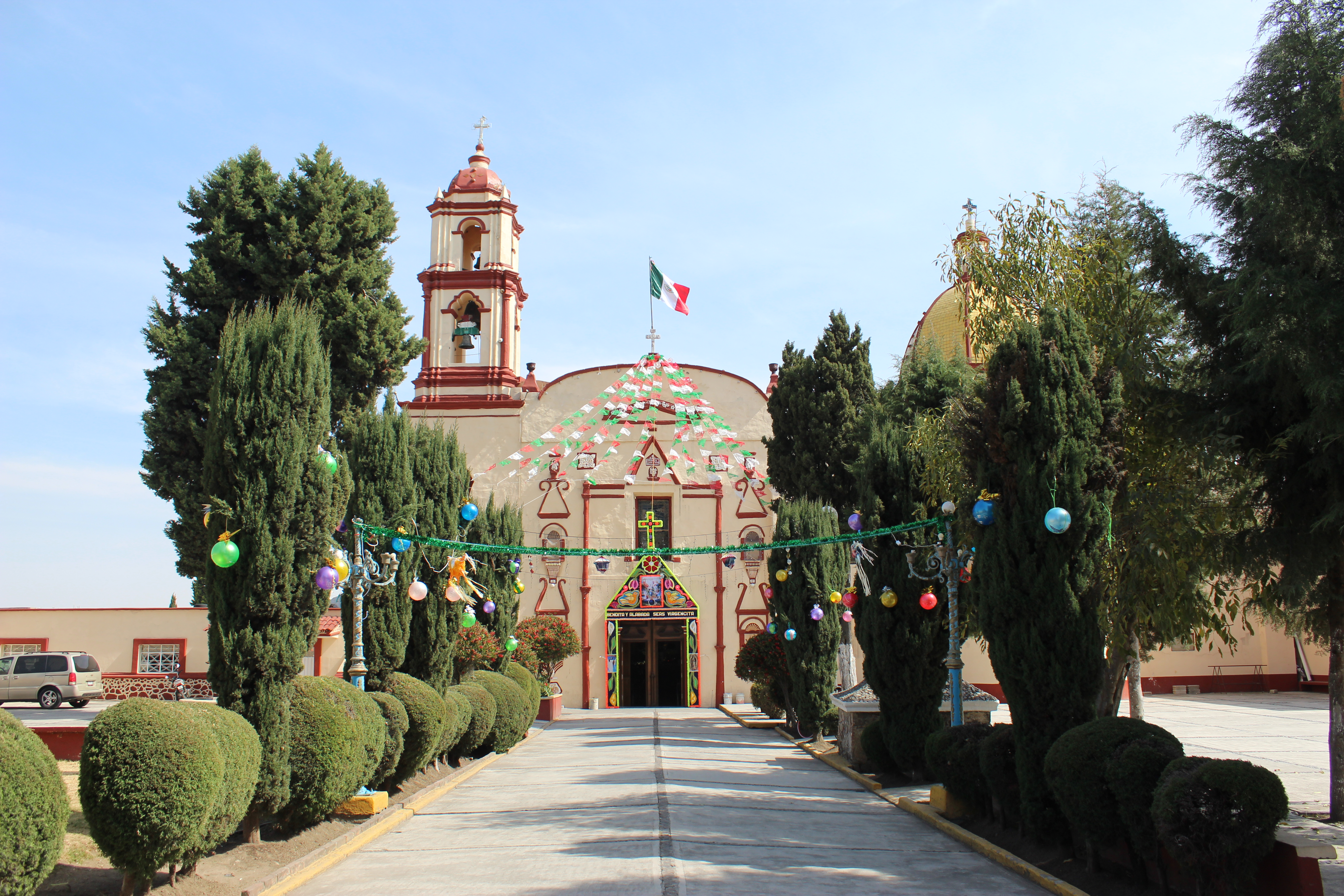
- Iglesia en San Miguel Totocuitlapilco
- Nickname: San Miguel Toto
- Location within Mexico
- Coordinates: 19°13′44″N 99°35′39″W
- Country: Mexico
- State: State of Mexico
- Municipality: Metepec
- Time zone: UTC-6 (CST)
- Postal code: 52143

San Miguel Totocuitlapilco in nahuatl ("in the tail of the bird") is a village located inside the Municipality of Metepec. It has a population of 377 and is 2600 meters above sea level.

This place is situated near Toluca, State of Mexico, Mexico, its geographical coordinates are 19° 13' 44" North, 99° 35' 39" West.
