= Tecaxic-Calixtlahuaca =

Mexica settlement in Mexico

Tecaxic-Calixtlahuaca was a site in the Toluca Valley, before it was destroyed and conquered by the Otomi and the Spanish conquistadors.
