= Either Jiménez =

Mexican footballer (born 2001)

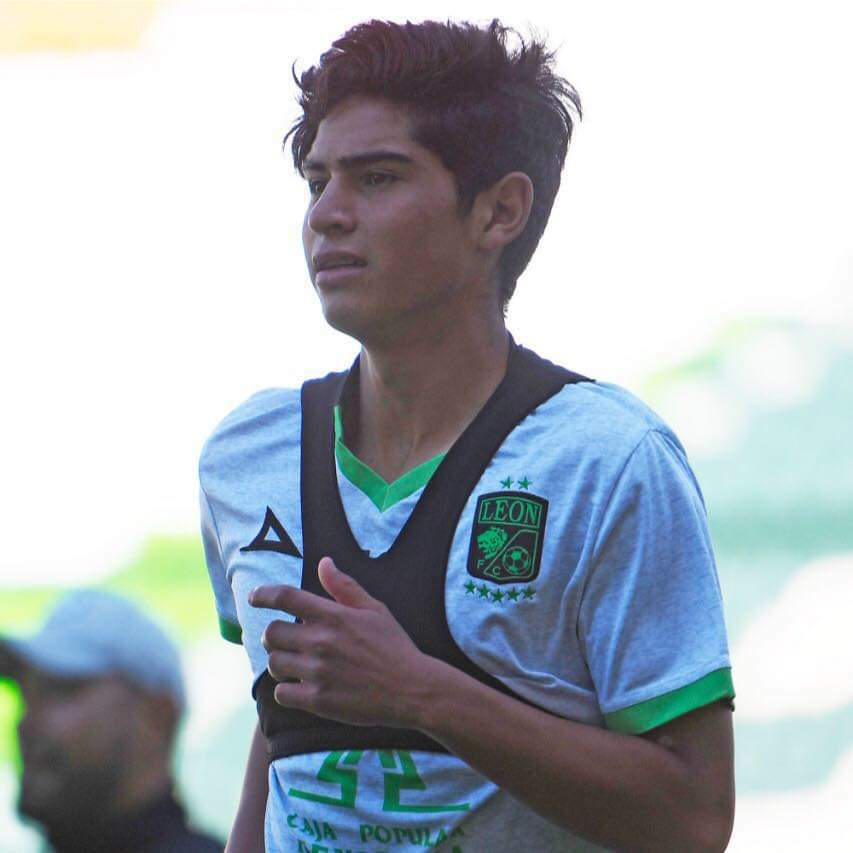

Personal information
- Full name: Either Domin Jiménez Rodríguez
- Date of birth: 30 March 2001 (age 25)
- Place of birth: Jerez, Zacatecas, Mexico
- Height: 1.73 m (5 ft 8 in)
- Position: Midfielder

Team information
- Current team: Tuzos UAZ
- Number: 18

Youth career
- 2018: Lobos de Zihuatanejo
- 2019: Futbol Zacatecas
- 2019–2021: León
- 2022: Pachuca

Senior career*
Years	Team	Apps	(Gls)
2019–2021	León	1	(0)
2021	→ Zacatecas (loan)	5	(0)
2022–2023	Pachuca	0	(0)
2022–2023	→ Pachuca Premier (loan)	15	(6)
2023	→ Oaxaca (loan)	0	(0)
2024	Calor		
2024–	Tuzos UAZ		
- * Club domestic league appearances and goals as of 26 January 2024

Either Domin Jiménez Rodríguez (born 30 March 2001) is a Mexican professional footballer who plays as a midfielder for Tuzos UAZ.

== Career statistics ==
=== Club ===
As of match played 30 November 2021.

Appearances and goals by club, season and competition
Club	Season	League			Cup		Continental		Other		Total	
Club	Season	Division	Apps	Goals	Apps	Goals	Apps	Goals	Apps	Goals	Apps	Goals
León	2018–19	Liga MX	1	0	–		–		–		1	0
Zacatecas (loan)	2020–21	Liga de Expansión MX	4	0	–		–		–		4	0
Zacatecas (loan)	2021–22	Liga de Expansión MX	1	0	–		–		–		1	0
Total			5	0	–		–		–		5	0
Career total			6	0	0	0	0	0	0	0	6	0
