= 2026–27 Liga TDP season =

Liga TDP
- Season: 2026–27
- Dates: 4 September 2026 – June 2027
- Matches: 1,157
- Goals: 3,993 (3.45 per match)
- Top goalscorer: Felipe García (24 goals)
- Stats are from the regular season only

The 2026–27 Liga TDP season is the fourth-tier football league of Mexico. The tournament began on 4 September 2026 and will finish on June 2027.

== Competition format ==
The Tercera División (Third Division) is divided into 18 groups. Since the 2009–2010 season, the format of the tournament has been reorganized to a home and away format, which all teams will play in their respective group. The 18 groups consist of teams which are eligible to play in the liguilla de ascenso (promotion play–offs) for four promotion spots, teams who are affiliated with teams in the Liga MX, Liga de Expansión MX and Liga Premier and development teams, which are not eligible for promotion but will play that who the better team in a sixteen team reserves playoff tournament for the entire season.

The regulation awards three points for a win, one point for a tie and zero points for a loss, however, when a match ends tied, a penalty shoot-out is played to award a bonus point to the winning team of the penalty series.

The league format allows participating franchises to rent their place to another team, so some clubs compete with a different name than the one registered with the FMF.

For the 2026–27 season there will be four promotions to the Liga Premier. Two to Premier A and two to Premier B.

== Group 1 ==
Group with 12 teams from Campeche, Quintana Roo and Yucatán.

Location of teams in the 2026–27 Liga TDP Group 1 (Campeche)
Location of teams in the 2026–27 Liga TDP Group 1 (Quintana Roo)
Location of teams in the 2026–27 Liga TDP Group 1 (Yucatán)

=== Teams ===
Team	City	Home ground	Capacity
Boston Cancún (Note: Team affiliated with Cancún.)	Cancún, Quintana Roo	CEDAR Cancún	1,000
Chetumal	Chetumal, Quintana Roo	10 de Abril	5,000
Corsarios de Campeche	Campeche, Campeche	Universitario de Campeche	4,000
Deportiva Venados TDP (Note: Team affiliated with Deportiva Venados.)	Tamanché, Yucatán	Alonso Diego Molina	2,500
Deportivo CTM Búhos	Puerto Morelos, Quintana Roo	Unidad Deportiva Colonia Pescadores	1,200
Ejidatarios de Bonfil	Alfredo V. Bonfil, Quintana Roo	La Parcela	1,000
Guerreros Cozumel (Note: Loan of Los Ángeles)	San Miguel de Cozumel, Quintana Roo	Unidad Deportiva Bicentenario	1,000
Inter Playa TDP (Note: Team affiliated with Inter Playa del Carmen.)	Playa del Carmen, Quintana Roo	Unidad Deportiva Mario Villanueva Madrid	7,500
Itzaes (Note: Team affiliated with Venados.) (Note: Loan of Progreso)	Progreso, Yucatán	20 de Noviembre	3,000
Marinos ISG	Ciudad del Carmen, Campeche	Delfín UNACAR	8,985
Mons Calpe Yucatán (Note: Team affiliated with Mons Calpe.)	Mérida, Yucatán	Campo Iches Burgos	500
Pioneros Junior (Note: Team affiliated with Pioneros de Cancún.)	Cancún, Quintana Roo	Cancún 86	6,390

=== League table ===
Pos	Team	Pld	W	D	L	GF	GA	GD	BP	Pts	Qualification
1	Chetumal	8	3	4	1	8	4	+4	4	17	Liguilla de Ascenso
2	Boston Cancún	7	4	2	1	12	5	+7	2	16	Liguilla de Filiales
3	Corsarios de Campeche	8	4	3	1	11	7	+4	1	16	Liguilla de Ascenso
4	Ejidatarios de Bonfil	8	4	3	1	16	9	+7	0	15	Liguilla de Ascenso
5	Itzaes	7	4	1	2	13	7	+6	1	14	
6	Deportiva Venados TDP	8	3	3	2	9	7	+2	2	14	
7	Guerreros Cozumel	8	1	5	2	8	9	−1	3	11	
8	Deportivo CTM Búhos	8	3	2	3	10	14	−4	0	11	
9	Pioneros Junior	8	3	1	4	6	8	−2	0	10	
10	Inter Playa TDP	8	1	3	4	9	12	−3	1	7	
11	Mons Calpe Azucareros	8	1	2	5	11	20	−9	1	6	
12	Marinos ISG	8	0	3	5	7	18	−11	1	4	

Updated to match(es) played on 15 November 2026. Source: Liga TDP

== Group 2 ==
Group with 16 teams from Chiapas, Oaxaca and Tabasco.

=== Teams ===
Location of teams in the 2026–27 Liga TDP Group 2 (Chiapas and Tabasco)
Location of teams in the 2026–27 Liga TDP Group 2 (Oaxaca)

Team	City	Home ground	Capacity
Alebrijes de Oaxaca TDP (Note: Team affiliated with Alebrijes de Oaxaca.)	Oaxaca City, Oaxaca	Microestadio ITO	1,000
Antequera	Oaxaca City, Oaxaca	Deportivo Ramos	1,000
CEFOR Chiapas	Tuxtla Gutiérrez, Chiapas	Flor de Sospo	3,000
Chapulineros de Oaxaca TDP (Note: Team affiliated with Chapulineros de Oaxaca.)	San Jerónimo Tlacochahuaya, Oaxaca	Independiente MRCI	6,000
Dragones de Oaxaca TDP (Note: Team affiliated with Dragones de Oaxaca.)	San Sebastián Etla, Oaxaca	UBEMEX	1,000
Felinos 48	Reforma, Chiapas	Sergio Lira Gallardo	600
Huracanes de Arriaga (Note: Loan of PRO CAMP)	Arriaga, Chiapas	Unidad Deportiva Arriaga	1,000
Jaguares TDP (Note: Team affiliated with Jaguares.)	Tuxtla Gutiérrez, Chiapas	Víctor Manuel Reyna	29,001
Lechuzas UPGCH	Tuxtla Gutiérrez, Chiapas	Flor de Sospo	3,000
Milenarios de Oaxaca (Note: Loan of Lobos ITECA)	Oaxaca City, Oaxaca	Parque Primavera	1,000
Napoli Tabasco (Note: Loan of Academia Dragones)	Villahermosa, Tabasco	Olímpico de Villahermosa	12,000
Pavones ADMC	Tuxtla Gutiérrez, Chiapas	ITESM Campus Chiapas	1,000
Pijijiapan (Note: Loan of Iguanas)	Pijijiapan, Chiapas	Unidad Deportiva Pijijiapan	1,000
Plataneros de Tabasco	Villahermosa, Tabasco	Olímpico de Villahermosa	12,000
Tapachula TDP (Note: Team affiliated with Tapachula.)	Tapachula, Chiapas	Olímpico de Tapachula	18,017
Universidad del Sureste	Comitán de Domínguez, Chiapas	Centro de Formación UDS	500

=== League table ===
Pos	Team	Pld	W	D	L	GF	GA	GD	BP	Pts	Qualification
1	Lechuzas UPGCH	11	9	2	0	26	3	+23	1	30	Liguilla de Ascenso
2	Universidad del Sureste	11	8	1	2	36	12	+24	0	25	Liguilla de Ascenso
3	Chapulineros de Oaxaca TDP	11	8	0	3	27	16	+11	0	24	Liguilla de Filiales
4	Plataneros de Tabasco	11	6	2	3	23	11	+12	2	22	Liguilla de Ascenso
5	Napoli Tabasco	11	6	2	3	23	17	+6	1	21	Liguilla de Filiales
6	CEFOR Chiapas	11	4	3	4	18	22	−4	3	18	
7	Tapachula TDP	10	4	2	4	14	14	0	1	15	
8	Dragones de Oaxaca TDP	11	3	4	4	14	15	−1	2	15	
9	Pijijiapan	10	3	4	3	23	20	+3	1	14	
10	Pavones ADMC	11	4	2	5	12	12	0	0	14	
11	Huracanes de Arriaga	11	3	4	4	13	16	−3	1	14	
12	Alebrijes de Oaxaca TDP	10	4	1	5	16	16	0	0	13	
13	Milenarios de Oaxaca	11	2	3	6	9	21	−12	2	11	
14	Jaguares TDP	8	2	2	4	11	16	−5	1	9	
15	Antequera	11	1	1	9	6	30	−24	1	5	
16	Felinos 48	11	0	3	8	12	42	−30	2	5	

Updated to match(es) played on 18 November 2026. Source: Liga TDP

== Group 3 ==
Group with 16 teams from Oaxaca and Veracruz.

=== Teams ===
Location of teams in the 2026–27 Liga TDP Group 3

Team	City	Home ground	Capacity
Afouteza Xalapa (Note: Loan of Formación Metropolitana)	Xalapa, Veracruz	Antonio M. Quirasco	2,000
Águila Azteca	Chocamán, Veracruz	El Mariscal	2,000
Atlético Boca del Río	Veracruz City, Veracruz	Instituto Tecnológico de Veracruz	1,000
Caballeros de Córdoba	Córdoba, Veracruz	Rafael Murillo Vidal	3,800
Chayoteros Ixtac	Ixtaczoquitlán, Veracruz	Unidad Deportiva Ixtac	1,000
Conejos de Tuxtepec	Tuxtepec, Oaxaca	Gustavo Pacheco Villaseñor	15,000
Córdoba	Córdoba, Veracruz	Rafael Murillo Vidal	3,800
Delfines Universidad de Sotavento (Note: Team affiliated with Delfines de Coatzacoalcos.)	Coatzacoalcos, Veracruz	Universitario Juan Manuel Rodríguez García	1,000
Delfines UGM	Nogales, Veracruz	UGM Nogales	1,500
Manta Rayas	Tierra Blanca, Veracruz	La Masía	1,000
Montañeses Potros Casino Español (Note: Team affiliated with Montañeses.)	Córdoba, Veracruz	Unidad Deportiva Casino Español	800
Performance	Boca del Río, Veracruz	UVM Campus Veracruz	500
Piratas Minatitlán (Note: Team affiliated with Piratas.)	Minatitlán, Veracruz	Campo Nanahuatzin	1,000
Piratas Poza Rica	Poza Rica, Veracruz	Heriberto Jara Corona	10,000
Piratas Sozca	Lerdo de Tejada, Veracruz	José Seoane Lavín	1,000
Racing de Veracruz TDP (Note: Team affiliated with Racing de Veracruz.)	Tuxtepec, Oaxaca	Gustavo Pacheco Villaseñor	15,000

=== League table ===
Pos	Team	Pld	W	D	L	GF	GA	GD	BP	Pts	Qualification
1	Racing de Veracruz TDP	11	9	2	0	33	7	+26	0	29	Liguilla de Filiales
2	Córdoba	11	4	6	1	21	10	+11	4	22	Liguilla de Ascenso
3	Afouteza Xalapa	11	6	2	3	25	18	+7	1	21	Liguilla de Ascenso
4	Montañeses Potros Casino Español	10	7	0	3	23	16	+7	0	21	Liguilla de Filiales
5	Piratas Poza Rica	10	6	2	2	16	11	+5	0	20	Liguilla de Filiales
6	Delfines Universidad de Sotavento	11	5	3	3	20	17	+3	2	20	Liguilla de Filiales
7	Águila Azteca	11	6	1	4	22	21	+1	0	19	Liguilla de Ascenso
8	Piratas Minatitlán	11	5	2	4	26	15	+11	1	18	
9	Caballeros de Córdoba	11	5	2	4	21	21	0	0	17	Liguilla de Ascenso
10	Performance	11	3	4	4	8	14	−6	4	17	
11	Conejos de Tuxtepec	11	4	2	5	29	24	+5	2	16	
12	Delfines UGM	11	3	4	4	20	15	+5	3	16	
13	Piratas Sozca	11	4	3	4	15	16	−1	0	15	
14	Chayoteros Ixtac	11	1	1	9	9	33	−24	1	5	
15	Atlético Boca del Río	11	0	3	8	12	36	−24	0	3	
16	Manta Rayas	11	0	1	10	4	30	−26	1	2	

Updated to match(es) played on 18 November 2026. Source: Liga TDP

== Group 4 ==
Group with 15 teams from Morelos, Puebla and Tlaxcala.

=== Teams ===
Location of teams in the 2026–27 Liga TDP Group 4 (Puebla and Tlaxcala)

Team	City	Home ground	Capacity
Cafeteros de Atlixco	Atlixco, Puebla	ATB	1,000
Cóndor	Cuautinchán, Puebla	Campos El Cóndor	500
Delta	Tehuacán, Puebla	Polideportivo La Huizachera	1,000
Deportivo JEM	Amozoc, Puebla	Unidad Deportiva Amozoc	1,000
Guerreros de Puebla	Puebla, Puebla	Olímpico Ignacio Zaragoza	22,000
Licántropos	Cuautinchán, Puebla	Campos El Cóndor	500
Ocelot Academy MX (Note: Loan of Tlapa)	San Pedro Cholula, Puebla	Cholula Soccer	500
PDLA	Santa Isabel Cholula, Puebla	Santa Isabel Cholula	1,000
Real Morelos 27	Emiliano Zapata, Morelos	Emiliano Zapata	3,000
Real Tlaxcala (Note: Loan of Atlético Tulancingo)	Nanacamilpa, Tlaxcala	Unidad Deportiva José Brindis	5,000
Reales de Puebla	Amozoc, Puebla	Unidad Deportiva Chachapa	1,000
Selva Cañera (Note: Team affiliated with Zacatepec.)	Zacatepec, Morelos	Agustín "Coruco" Díaz	24,313
Tehuacán	Tehuacán, Puebla	Polideportivo La Huizachera	1,000
Yautepec	Yautepec, Morelos	Campo Deportivo Yautepec	3,000
Zapata	Xochitepec, Morelos	Real del Puente	1,000

=== League table ===
Pos	Team	Pld	W	D	L	GF	GA	GD	BP	Pts	Qualification
1	PDLA	10	9	0	1	21	6	+15	0	27	Liguilla de Ascenso
2	Licántropos	10	7	1	2	28	10	+18	1	23	Liguilla de Ascenso
3	Real Morelos 27	10	7	2	1	16	6	+10	0	23	Liguilla de Ascenso
4	Ocelot Academy MX	10	6	2	2	17	10	+7	2	22	Liguilla de Ascenso
5	Yautepec	10	7	0	3	37	12	+25	0	21	
6	Delta	10	7	0	3	15	10	+5	0	21	
7	Cóndor	10	4	2	4	21	17	+4	2	16	
8	Selva Cañera	11	4	3	4	19	21	−2	1	16	
9	Deportivo JEM	11	2	4	5	12	23	−11	2	12	
10	Guerreros de Puebla	10	3	1	6	9	18	−9	1	11	
11	Reales de Puebla	11	3	2	6	17	34	−17	0	11	
12	Zapata	10	3	0	7	10	16	−6	0	9	
13	Real Tlaxcala	10	2	1	7	11	27	−16	0	7	
14	Tehuacán	10	2	0	8	13	23	−10	0	6	
15	Cafeteros de Atlixco	11	2	0	9	11	24	−13	0	6	

Updated to match(es) played on 18 November 2026. Source: Liga TDP

== Group 5 ==
Group with 15 teams from Greater Mexico City.

=== Teams ===
Location of teams in the 2026–27 Liga TDP Group 5

Team	City	Home ground	Capacitye
Álamos (Note: Team affiliated with Guadalajara.)	Venustiano Carranza, Mexico City	Deportivo Plutarco Elías Calles	1,000
Alebrijes CDMX (Note: Team affiliated with Alebrijes de Oaxaca.)	Venustiano Carranza, Mexico City	Deportivo Oceanía	500
Aragón	Gustavo A. Madero, Mexico City	Deportivo Francisco Zarco	1,000
Around Soccer	Venustiano Carranza, Mexico City	Deportivo Oceanía	500
Aztecas AMF Soccer	Gustavo A. Madero, Mexico City	Deportivo Francisco Zarco	1,000
Azul Real Jilo (Note: Loan of Valle de Xico)	Venustiano Carranza, Mexico City	Deportivo Lázaro Cárdenas	2,000
CDM	Venustiano Carranza, Mexico City	Deportivo Oceanía	500
Coyotes Neza (Note: Loan of Halcones Zúñiga)	Venustiano Carranza, Mexico City	Deportivo Oceanía	1,000
FORMAFUTINTEGRAL	Venustiano Carranza, Mexico City	Deportivo Lázaro Cárdenas	2,000
Gama Soccer (Note: Loan of Novillos Neza)	Iztacalco, Mexico City	Jesús Martínez "Palillo"	6,000
Halcones de Rayón	Gustavo A. Madero, Mexico City	Deportivo Francisco Zarco	1,000
Héroes de Zaci CDMX (Note: Team affiliated with Héroes de Zaci.)	Venustiano Carranza, Mexico City	Deportivo Lázaro Cárdenas	2,000
León Izcalli (Note: Loan of Muxes)	Venustiano Carranza, Mexico City	Deportivo Lázaro Cárdenas	2,000
Oceanía	Venustiano Carranza, Mexico City	Deportivo Oceanía	1,000
Politécnico	Iztacalco, Mexico City	Deportivo Leandro Valle	1,000

=== League table ===
Pos	Team	Pld	W	D	L	GF	GA	GD	BP	Pts	Qualification
1	Politécnico	10	8	1	1	33	11	+22	1	26	Liguilla de Ascenso
2	Aztecas AMF Soccer	11	8	1	2	22	8	+14	0	25	Liguilla de Ascenso
3	Héroes de Zaci CDMX	10	6	2	2	21	11	+10	2	22	Liguilla de Filiales
4	Azul Real Jilo	10	6	3	1	16	7	+9	1	22	Liguilla de Ascenso
5	CDM	9	5	4	0	23	9	+14	2	21	Liguilla de Filiales
6	Oceanía	9	6	2	1	17	7	+10	1	21	Liguilla de Ascenso
7	Álamos	10	5	2	3	14	11	+3	2	19	
8	Alebrijes CDMX	10	5	2	3	21	14	+7	1	18	Liguilla de Filiales
9	FORMAFUTINTEGRAL	10	3	4	3	11	13	−2	0	13	
10	Coyotes Neza	9	2	2	5	16	19	−3	2	10	
11	Gama Soccer	9	3	0	6	14	21	−7	0	9	
12	León Izcalli	11	2	0	9	15	27	−12	0	6	
13	Around Soccer	11	2	0	9	6	35	−29	0	6	
14	Halcones de Rayón	11	1	1	9	8	28	−20	0	4	
15	Aragón	10	0	2	8	8	24	−16	1	3	

Updated to match(es) played on 15 November 2026. Source: Liga TDP

== Group 6 ==
Group with 16 teams from Greater Mexico City.

=== Teams ===
Location of teams in the 2026–27 Liga TDP Group 6
Location of teams in the 2026–27 Liga TDP Group 6 (Outer Greater Mexico City)

Team	City	Home ground	Capacity
Arietes	Coyoacán, Mexico City	Cancha 5 Sindicato Mexicano de Electricistas	500
CEFAR Azul Iztacalco (Note: Team affiliated with Ciervos.)	Iztacalco, Mexico City	Deportivo Leandro Valle	1,000
CEFOR 3030	Ecatepec, State of Mexico	Titanium Soccer	500
Cruz Azul Tultepec (Note: Loan of Atlético Mexicano)	Tultepec, State of Mexico	Campos La Estrella	500
CH Fútbol Club	Venustiano Carranza, Mexico City	Deportivo Oceanía	1,000
Colegio Once México	Tlalnepantla, State of Mexico	Parque de la Ciencia	500
Ecatepec	Tecámac, State of Mexico	San Juan Bosco	500
Guardianes de Oriente	Gustavo A. Madero, Mexico City	Deportivo Los Galeana	1,000
Independiente Mexiquense	Huehuetoca, State of Mexico	12 de Mayo	1,500
LLO	Tecámac, State of Mexico	San Juan Bosco	500
Lonsdaleíta	Tultitlán, State of Mexico	Campo de Fútbol Belem	500
Marina	Ecatepec, State of Mexico	Guadalupe Victoria	1,000
Nicolás Romero (Note: Team affiliated with Cañoneros.)	Progreso Industrial, State of Mexico	Progreso Industrial	4,000
Sangre de Campeón	Tultitlán, State of Mexico	Campo de Fútbol Belem	500
Sk Sport Street Soccer	Venustiano Carranza, Mexico City	Deportivo Venustiano Carranza	500
Unión	Ecatepec, State of Mexico	Titanium Soccer	500

=== League table ===
Pos	Team	Pld	W	D	L	GF	GA	GD	BP	Pts	Qualification
1	LLO	11	10	0	1	35	10	+25	0	30	Liguilla de Ascenso
2	CH Fútbol Club	11	9	0	2	49	14	+35	0	27	Liguilla de Ascenso
3	CEFOR 3030	11	8	1	2	37	6	+31	0	25	Liguilla de Ascenso
4	Sangre de Campeón	10	8	0	2	27	13	+14	0	24	Liguilla de Ascenso
5	Independiente Mexiquense	10	7	1	2	25	6	+19	1	23	
6	Marina	11	6	1	4	25	11	+14	1	20	
7	Ecatepec	11	6	0	5	19	13	+6	0	18	
8	Guardianes de Oriente	11	6	0	5	23	28	−5	0	18	
9	Arietes	11	4	3	4	16	14	+2	1	16	
10	Lonsdaleíta	11	3	4	4	13	15	−2	3	16	
11	Unión	10	4	2	4	19	22	−3	0	14	
12	Nicolás Romero	10	2	1	7	15	33	−18	0	7	
13	Colegio Once México	11	2	0	9	10	37	−27	0	6	
14	Sk Sport Street Soccer	11	2	0	9	9	40	−31	0	6	
15	Cruz Azul Tultepec	11	0	3	8	6	33	−27	1	4	
16	CEFAR Azul Iztacalco	11	0	2	9	6	39	−33	2	4	

Updated to match(es) played on 15 November 2026. Source: Liga TDP

== Group 7 ==
Group with 14 teams from Guerrero and Mexico City.

=== Teams ===
Location of teams in the 2026–27 Liga TDP Group 7 (Greater Mexico City)
Location of teams in the 2026–27 Liga TDP Group 6 (Outer Greater Mexico City)
Location of teams in the 2026–27 Liga TDP Group 8 (Guerrero)

Team	City	Home ground	Capacity
Águilas UAGro	Chilpancingo, Guerrero	UAGro	2,000
América TDP (Note: Team affiliated with América.)	Coyoacán, Mexico City	Instalaciones Club América	500
Balam (Note: Team affiliated with Huracanes Izcalli.)	Venustiano Carranza, Mexico City	Deportivo Oceanía	1,000
Cantera Coka	Coyoacán, Mexico City	Cancha 5 Sindicato Mexicano de Electricistas	500
CEFOR Mexiquense (Note: Loan of Domínguez Osos)	Venustiano Carranza, Mexico City	Deportivo Oceanía	1,000
CILESI	Xochimilco, Mexico City	Valentín González	2,500
Club RX	Xochimilco, Mexico City	Campos Zague	500
Cuemanco (Note: Loan of Atlético Pachuca)	Xochimilco, Mexico City	Valentín González	2,500
Guerreros del Pacífico TDP (Note: Team affiliated with Guerreros del Pacífico.)	Chilpancingo, Guerrero	UAGro	2,000
Mineros Carranza CDMX (Note: Team affiliated with Mineros de Zacatecas.)	Venustiano Carranza, Mexico City	Deportivo Venustiano Carranza	500
Mineros CDMX	Milpa Alta, Mexico City	Momoxco	3,500
Olimpo	Xochimilco, Mexico City	San Isidro	1,200
San José del Arenal	Venustiano Carranza, Mexico City	Deportivo Oceanía	1,000
Villa (Note: Loan of Atlético Cuernavaca)	Milpa Alta, Mexico City	Momoxco	3,500

=== League table ===
Pos	Team	Pld	W	D	L	GF	GA	GD	BP	Pts	Qualification
1	América TDP	10	8	0	2	36	6	+30	0	24	Liguilla de Filiales
2	Águilas UAGro	9	6	2	1	39	8	+31	1	21	Liguilla de Ascenso
3	Villa	10	7	0	3	40	14	+26	0	21	Liguilla de Ascenso
4	Guerreros del Pacífico TDP	10	6	2	2	24	14	+10	1	21	Liguilla de Filiales
5	Cantera Coka	10	5	2	3	23	18	+5	1	18	
6	Mineros Carranza CDMX	10	5	1	4	22	19	+3	1	17	
7	CEFOR Mexiquense	10	5	1	4	20	12	+8	0	16	
8	Olimpo	9	4	2	3	18	13	+5	1	15	
9	Mineros CDMX	10	4	3	3	22	25	−3	0	15	
10	San José del Arenal	10	3	2	5	24	30	−6	2	13	
11	Balam	10	4	0	6	20	24	−4	0	12	
12	Club RX	10	2	3	5	11	14	−3	2	11	
13	Cuemanco	10	1	0	9	9	43	−34	0	3	
14	CILESI	10	0	0	10	0	68	−68	0	0	

Updated to match(es) played on 15 November 2026. Source: Liga TDP

== Group 8 ==
Group with 16 teams from Hidalgo, Mexico City and State of Mexico.

Location of teams in the 2026–27 Liga TDP Group 8

=== Teams ===
Team	City	Home ground	Capacity
Ajolotes Lerma	Lerma, State of Mexico	Unidad Deportiva Lerma	1,000
Artesanos Huixquilucan (Note: Team affiliated with Artesanos Metepec.)	Huixquilucan, State of Mexico	Santos Degollado	1,000
Artesanos Metepec TDP	Metepec, State of Mexico	La Hortaliza	2,000
CID Leones Negros Toluca (Note: Loan of Grupo Sherwood)	Santa María Rayón, State of Mexico	Unidad Deportiva Dionicio Cerón	1,000
Cordobés TDP (Note: Team affiliated with Cordobés.)	Huixquilucan, State of Mexico	Alberto Pérez Navarro	3,000
Dragones Toluca	Zinacantepec, State of Mexico	San Luis Mextepec	1,000
Estudiantes	San Felipe del Progreso, State of Mexico	Margarito Esquivel	1,000
Fuerza Mazahua	San Antonio La Isla, State of Mexico	Unidad Deportiva San Antonio La Isla	1,000
Guerreros Dorados (Note: Loan of Iguala)	San Pablo Autopan, State of Mexico	San Pablo Autopan	1,000
Leones Huixquilucan	Huixquilucan, State of Mexico	Alberto Pérez Navarro	3,000
Luma Sports	Villa Cuauhtémoc, State of Mexico	Centro Deportivo y Cultural Las Peñas	1,000
Marlines	Toluca, State of Mexico	Unidad Deportiva Crisóforo Zárate Zúñiga	1,000
Deportivo Metepec	Metepec, State of Mexico	Jesús Lara	1,000
Orishas Tepeji	Tepeji, Hidalgo	Tepeji	2,000
Real Santa Fe	Santa Fe, Mexico City	Alameda Poniente	1,000
Real TM	Huixquilucan, State of Mexico	Santos Degollado	1,000

=== League table ===
Pos	Team	Pld	W	D	L	GF	GA	GD	BP	Pts	Qualification
1	Estudiantes	10	8	2	0	28	12	+16	2	28	Liguilla de Ascenso
2	Deportivo Metepec	11	6	3	2	20	12	+8	1	22	Liguilla de Ascenso
3	Leones Huixquilucan	11	5	4	2	29	18	+11	1	20	Liguilla de Ascenso
4	Guerreros Dorados	11	4	5	2	17	13	+4	3	20	Liguilla de Ascenso
5	Artesanos Metepec TDP	11	5	3	3	11	11	0	2	20	Liguilla de Filiales
6	Dragones Toluca	11	6	1	4	23	18	+5	0	19	
7	Orishas Tepeji	11	4	4	3	14	9	+5	3	19	
8	Real TM	11	4	3	4	20	19	+1	2	17	
9	CID Leones Negros Toluca	11	4	3	4	17	17	0	2	17	
10	Luma Sports	11	2	6	3	14	14	0	2	14	
11	Real Santa Fe	11	3	3	5	15	18	−3	2	14	
12	Marlines	11	3	2	6	14	20	−6	2	13	
13	Cordobés TDP	10	3	2	5	11	14	−3	0	11	
14	Fuerza Mazahua	11	3	1	7	10	24	−14	0	10	
15	Artesanos Huixquilucan	11	2	3	6	13	25	−12	0	9	
16	Ajolotes Lerma	11	2	1	8	10	22	−12	1	8	

Updated to match(es) played on 18 November 2026. Source: Liga TDP

== Group 9 ==
Group with 16 teams from Hidalgo, State of Mexico and Tamaulipas.

=== Teams ===
Location of teams in the 2026–27 Liga TDP Group 9 (Hidalgo)
Location of teams in the 2026–27 Liga TDP Group 9 (State of Mexico)
Location of teams in the 2026–27 Liga TDP Group 16 (Tamaulipas)

Team	City	Home ground	Capacity
Águilas de Teotitihuacán	San Martín de las Pirámides, State of Mexico	Deportivo Braulio Romero	1,000
Alebrijes Teotihuacán (Note: Team affiliated with Alebrijes de Oaxaca.)	San Juan Teotihuacán, State of Mexico	Centro Deportivo Pascual	1,000
Atlético Hidalgo TDP (Note: Team affiliated with Atlético Hidalgo.)	Tezontepec, Hidalgo	Palemón Tigres	500
Atlético de La Plata (Note: Loan of Caudillos de Morelos.)	Mineral de la Reforma, Hidalgo	Horacio Baños González	1,000
Atlético Sierra Hermosa	Tecámac, State of Mexico	Deportivo Sierra Hermosa	1,000
Bombarderos de Tecámac	Tecámac, State of Mexico	San Juan Bosco	500
Centro de Talentos Volten	Papalotla, State of Mexico	Unidad Deportiva Papalotla	1,000
Héroes de Zaci Hidalgo (Note: Team affiliated with Héroes de Zaci.)	Hueypoxtla, State of Mexico	Guadalupe Nopala	500
Hidalguense	Pachuca, Hidalgo	Club Hidalguense	600
Industriales de Altamira	Altamira, Tamaulipas	Altamira	9,581
Jaiba Brava TDP (Note: Team affiliated with Jaiba Brava.)	Tampico and Ciudad Madero, Tamaulipas	Tamaulipas	19,667
Pachuca TDP (Note: Team affiliated with Pachuca.)	San Agustín Tlaxiaca, Hidalgo	Universidad del Fútbol	1,000
Santiago Tulantepec	Pachuca, Hidalgo	Club Hidalguense	600
Soles de Teotihuacán (Note: Loan of Matamoros.)	San Juan Teotihuacán, State of Mexico	Centro Deportivo Pascual	1,000
Toltecas Universidad CAPEC	Tula, Hidalgo	Parque 7 de Agosto	1,000
UFD Tuzos Pachuca	San Agustín Tlaxiaca, Hidalgo	Universidad del Fútbol	1,000

=== League table ===
Pos	Team	Pld	W	D	L	GF	GA	GD	BP	Pts	Qualification
1	Centro de Talentos Volten	11	8	2	1	30	3	+27	2	28	Liguilla de Ascenso
2	Pachuca TDP	11	8	2	1	28	5	+23	0	26	Liguilla de Filiales
3	Industriales de Altamira	11	7	3	1	27	11	+16	1	25	Liguilla de Ascenso
4	Jaiba Brava TDP	11	6	3	2	34	8	+26	2	23	Liguilla de Filiales
5	Héroes de Zaci Hidalgo	10	7	2	1	26	14	+12	0	23	Liguilla de Filiales
6	Toltecas Universidad CAPEC	11	5	4	2	30	14	+16	2	21	Liguilla de Ascenso
7	Atlético Sierra Hermosa	11	7	0	4	25	16	+9	0	21	Liguilla de Ascenso
8	UFD Tuzos Pachuca	11	5	3	3	20	11	+9	2	20	
9	Hidalguense	11	4	2	5	19	20	−1	2	16	
10	Santiago Tulantepec	11	4	1	6	13	22	−9	1	14	
11	Bombarderos de Tecámac	11	4	1	6	9	17	−8	0	13	
12	Alebrijes Teotihuacán	11	2	3	6	9	23	−14	0	9	
13	Atlético de La Plata	11	2	1	8	7	29	−22	0	7	
14	Águilas de Teotitihuacán	11	1	2	8	8	33	−25	2	7	
15	Atlético Hidalgo TDP	10	1	1	8	10	50	−40	1	5	
16	Soles de Teotihuacán	11	1	0	10	11	30	−19	0	3	

Updated to match(es) played on 18 November 2026. Source: Liga TDP

== Group 10 ==
Group with 13 teams from Guanajuato, Hidalgo and Querétaro.

Location of teams in the 2026–27 Liga TDP Group 10 (Guanajuato)
Location of teams in the 2026–27 Liga TDP Group 10 (Querétaro)

=== Teams ===
Team	City	Home ground	Capacity
BFC	Querétaro, Querétaro	Olímpico Alameda	4,600
Cajeteros Celaya	Celaya, Guanajuato	Campo Municipal LUC	1,000
CEFOMH	San Juan del Río, Querétaro	Unidad Deportiva Maquío	1,000
Celaya Linces	Comonfort, Guanajuato	Brígido Vargas	4,000
Estudiantes de Querétaro	Querétaro, Querétaro	Escuela Normal de Querétaro	1,000
Fundadores El Marqués	Santa Rosa, Querétaro	Parque Bicentenario	2,000
Instituto de Fútbol de Alta Competencia	Santa Rosa, Querétaro	Parque Bicentenario	2,000
Inter de Querétaro (Note: Loan of Atlético Huejutla.)	Querétaro, Querétaro	Instituto Queretano Marista San Javier	500
La Piedad Querétaro	Querétaro, Querétaro	El Infiernillo	1,000
Lobos ULMX TDP (Note: Team affiliated with Lobos ULMX.)	Celaya, Guanajuato	ULMX	1,200
Metaleros de Zimapán	Zimapán, Hidalgo	Municipal Aloys Preisser	1,000
San Juan del Río	San Juan del Río, Querétaro	Unidad Deportiva Norte	1,000
Titanes de Querétaro	Querétaro, Querétaro	Instituto Queretano Marista San Javier	500

=== League table ===
Pos	Team	Pld	W	D	L	GF	GA	GD	BP	Pts	Qualification
1	San Juan del Río	9	7	1	1	17	5	+12	0	22	Liguilla de Ascenso
2	Estudiantes de Querétaro	9	6	2	1	16	7	+9	0	20	Liguilla de Ascenso
3	Instituto de Fútbol de Alta Competencia	9	6	1	2	23	12	+11	0	19	Liguilla de Ascenso
4	Lobos ULMX TDP	10	4	4	2	23	11	+12	2	18	
5	Titanes de Querétaro	9	5	2	2	19	12	+7	1	18	Liguilla de Ascenso
6	Celaya Linces	9	5	2	2	15	9	+6	1	18	
7	La Piedad Querétaro	9	3	4	2	16	12	+4	2	15	
8	Metaleros de Zimapán	9	2	4	3	8	13	−5	4	14	
9	Inter de Querétaro	9	3	1	5	12	13	−1	2	12	
10	Cajeteros Celaya	9	3	2	4	11	14	−3	0	11	
11	Fundadores El Marqués	9	1	2	6	5	20	−15	1	6	
12	BFC	10	1	1	8	10	23	−13	0	4	
13	CEFOMH	10	0	2	8	6	30	−24	2	4	

Updated to match(es) played on 18 November 2026. Source: Liga TDP

== Group 11 ==
Group with 9 teams from Guanajuato and Michoacán.

=== Teams ===
Location of teams in the 2026–27 Liga TDP Group 11

Team	City	Home ground	Capacity
Aguacateros CDU (Note: Team affiliated with Atlético Morelia.)	Uruapan, Michoacán	Unidad Deportiva Hermanos López Rayón	5,000
Atlético Morelia–UMSNH	Morelia, Michoacán	Universitario UMSNH	5,000
Delfines de Abasolo	Abasolo, Guanajuato	Municipal de Abasolo	1,500
Deportivo Sahuayo	Sahuayo, Michoacán	Unidad Deportiva Francisco García Vilchis	1,500
Deportivo Zamora	Zamora, Michoacán	Unidad Deportiva El Chamizal	5,000
Furia Azul	Pátzcuaro, Michoacán	Furia Azul	3,000
Guerreros Zacapu (Note: Loan of Atlético Valladolid.)	Zacapu, Michoacán	Cancha LunaGriss	500
La Piedad Imperial	La Piedad, Michoacán	Club Azteca	1,000
Purépechas TDP (Note: Team affiliated with Purépechas.)	Morelia, Michoacán	Venustiano Carranza	17,000

=== League table ===
Pos	Team	Pld	W	D	L	GF	GA	GD	BP	Pts	Qualification
1	Atlético Morelia–UMSNH	6	6	0	0	16	1	+15	0	18	Liguilla de Filiales
2	Purépechas TDP	7	4	1	2	10	9	+1	0	13	
3	Deportivo Sahuayo	6	3	1	2	7	6	+1	1	11	Liguilla de Ascenso
4	La Piedad Imperial	6	3	0	3	11	8	+3	0	9	Liguilla de Ascenso
5	Delfines de Abasolo	6	2	2	2	7	14	−7	1	9	Liguilla de Ascenso
6	Deportivo Zamora	6	2	1	3	7	6	+1	1	8	
7	Aguacateros CDU	6	2	1	3	9	10	−1	0	7	
8	Guerreros Zacapu	6	1	2	3	10	12	−2	1	6	
9	Furia Azul	7	1	0	6	5	16	−11	0	3	

Updated to match(es) played on 15 November 2026. Source: Liga TDP

== Group 12 ==
Group with 15 teams from Aguascalientes, Guanajuato, Jalisco, San Luis Potosí and Zacatecas.

=== Teams ===
Location of teams in the 2026–27 Liga TDP Group 12 (Guanajuato and Jalisco)
Location of teams in the 2026–27 Liga TDP Group 12 (Aguascalientes, San Luis Potosí and Zacatecas)

Team	City	Home ground	Capacity
Atlético ECCA	León, Guanajuato	Parque Metropolitano	500
Brujas Soccer	Villa de Arriaga, San Luis Potosí	Unidad Deportiva 7 de Mayo	1,000
Cefor Promotora San Luis	Soledad de Graciano Sánchez, San Luis Potosí	Unidad Deportiva 21 de Marzo	7,000
Centro Especializado de Fútbolistas LU	León, Guanajuato	Parque Metropolitano	500
Empresarios del Rincón (Note: Loan of Real Olmeca Sport.)	León, Guanajuato	CODE Las Joyas	1,000
Gorilas TDP (Note: Team affiliated with Gorilas.)	León, Guanajuato	Instituto Oviedo Náutico	800
León GEN (Note: Team affiliated with León.)	Lagos de Moreno, Jalisco	La Esmeralda Club León	2,000
Leyendas	Guanajuato, Guanajuato	Unidad Deportiva Nieto Piña	1,000
Magos del Rincón	San Francisco del Rincón, Guanajuato	Domingo Velázquez	3,500
Mineros de Zacatecas TDP (Note: Team affiliated with Mineros de Zacatecas.)	Zacatecas, Zacatecas	Unidad Deportiva Guadalupe	1,000
Necaxa TDP (Note: Team affiliated with Necaxa.)	Aguascalientes, Aguascalientes	Casa Club Necaxa	1,000
Pabellón	Aguascalientes, Aguascalientes	Ferrocarrilero	1,000
Santa Ana del Conde	Santa Ana del Conde, Guanajuato	El Roble	500
Trinca de Mi Vida	Abasolo, Guanajuato	Campo Fertijoaquín	500
Tuzos UAZ	Zacatecas, Zacatecas	Universitario Unidad Deportiva Norte	5,000

=== League table ===
Pos	Team	Pld	W	D	L	GF	GA	GD	BP	Pts	Qualification
1	Trinca de Mi Vida	11	10	1	0	57	3	+54	1	32	Liguilla de Ascenso
2	Gorilas TDP	10	8	2	0	28	6	+22	0	26	Liguilla de Filiales
3	Magos del Rincón	10	6	3	1	24	12	+12	0	21	Liguilla de Ascenso
4	Tuzos UAZ	11	4	4	3	32	19	+13	4	20	
5	Mineros de Zacatecas TDP	10	6	2	2	26	18	+8	0	20	Liguilla de Filiales
6	Brujas Soccer	10	4	3	3	19	15	+4	2	17	Liguilla de Ascenso
7	Cefor Promotora San Luis	10	5	1	4	19	19	0	0	16	Liguilla de Ascenso
8	Centro Especializado de Fútbolistas LU	10	5	0	5	21	20	+1	0	15	
9	Leyendas	10	5	0	5	15	23	−8	0	15	
10	León GEN	10	4	1	5	23	18	+5	1	14	
11	Necaxa TDP	10	4	0	6	22	16	+6	0	12	
12	Santa Ana del Conde	11	2	4	5	17	25	−8	2	12	
13	Atlético ECCA	10	1	2	7	6	29	−23	1	6	
14	Empresarios del Rincón	11	0	2	9	5	67	−62	2	4	
15	Pabellón	10	0	1	9	7	31	−24	0	1	

Updated to match(es) played on 15 November 2026. Source: Liga TDP

== Group 13 ==
Group with 12 teams from Jalisco.

=== Teams ===
Location of teams in the 2026–27 Liga TDP Group 13

Team	City	Home ground	Capacity
ACF Zapotlanejo TDP (Note: Team affiliated with ACF Zapotlanejo.)	Zapotlanejo, Jalisco	Miguel Hidalgo	1,800
Agaveros	Tlajomulco de Zúñiga, Jalisco	Deportivo Rincón del Zurdo	500
Alfarero de Tlaquepaque	Tlaquepaque, Jalisco	Parque Liberación	500
Aves Blancas	Tepatitlán de Morelos, Jalisco	Corredor Industrial	1,200
Charales de Chapala	Chapala, Jalisco	Municipal Juan Rayo	1,200
Gorilas de Juanacatlán (Note: Team affiliated with Gorilas.)	Juanacatlán, Jalisco	Club Juanacatlán	800
Grizzly (Note: Loan of Deportivo Cimagol.)	El Salto, Jalisco	Club Deportivo Río Grande	500
Jabalís Mirasol	Capilla de Guadalupe, Jalisco	Finés	1,000
Leones Negros UdeG TDP (Note: Team affiliated with Leones Negros UdeG.)	Zapopan, Jalisco	Club Deportivo U. de G.	3,000
Nacional	Tlaquepaque, Jalisco	Unidad Deportiva Froc	1,000
Tapatíos Soccer	Zapopan, Jalisco	Centro de Alto Rendimiento Tapatíos	1,000
Tepatitlán TDP (Note: Team affiliated with Tepatitlán.)	Tepatitlán de Morelos, Jalisco	Gregorio "Tepa" Gómez	8,085

=== League table ===
Pos	Team	Pld	W	D	L	GF	GA	GD	BP	Pts	Qualification
1	Tapatíos Soccer	8	6	2	0	28	9	+19	2	22	Liguilla de Ascenso
2	Gorilas de Juanacatlán	8	7	0	1	20	5	+15	0	21	Liguilla de Filiales
3	Leones Negros UdeG TDP	8	5	2	1	18	8	+10	2	19	Liguilla de Filiales
4	ACF Zapotlanejo TDP	8	5	3	0	13	7	+6	1	19	Liguilla de Filiales
5	Charales de Chapala	8	3	4	1	16	12	+4	1	14	Liguilla de Ascenso
6	Aves Blancas	8	3	2	3	14	14	0	1	12	Liguilla de Ascenso
7	Alfarero de Tlaquepaque	8	3	1	4	15	14	+1	0	10	Liguilla de Ascenso
8	Jabalís Mirasol	8	3	1	4	12	18	−6	0	10	
9	Tepatitlán TDP	8	3	0	5	13	17	−4	0	9	
10	Agaveros	8	1	1	6	4	17	−13	1	5	
11	Nacional	8	0	1	7	5	16	−11	1	2	
12	Grizzly	8	0	1	7	5	26	−21	0	1	

Updated to match(es) played on 15 November 2026. Source: Liga TDP

== Group 14 ==
Group with 12 teams from Colima and Jalisco.

=== Teams ===
Location of teams in the 2026–27 Liga TDP Group 14

Team	City	Home ground	Capacity
Atlético Cuauhtémoc (Note: Loan of Hermanos Benítez.)	Cuauhtémoc, Colima	Unidad Deportiva Cuauhtémoc	1,000
Atlético Punto Sur (Note: Loan of Club Suré.)	Tlajomulco de Zúñiga, Jalisco	Campos Punto Sur	500
CAFESSA	Tlajomulco de Zúñiga, Jalisco	Unidad Deportiva Mariano Otero	3,000
Caja Oblatos	Zapopan, Jalisco	Optimum Club	500
CAR Toros	Tlajomulco de Zúñiga, Jalisco	Club Pumitas Arceo	500
Deportivo El Grullo	El Grullo, Jalisco	Agustín Peregrina	1,000
Deportivo Purificación (Note: Team affiliated with Guerreros de Autlán.) (Note: Loan of Guerreros de Autlán TDP.)	Villa Purificación, Jalisco	Unidad Deportiva Villa Purificación	1,000
Elite Darka (Note: Loan of Catedráticos Elite)	Zapopan, Jalisco	Optimum Club	500
Gambeta	Guadalajara, Jalisco	Club Deportivo San Rafael	1,000
Loros UdeC (Note: Team affiliated with ACF Zapotlanejo.) (Note: Loan of ACF Acatlán.)	Colima, Colima	Olímpico Universitario de Colima	11,812
Progreso de Cocula (Note: Team affiliated with Tlaxcala.) (Note: Loan of Tlaxcala TDP.)	Cocula, Jalisco	Hércules 77	1,000
Real Ánimas de Sayula	Sayula, Jalisco	Gustavo Díaz Ordaz	4,000

=== League table ===
Pos	Team	Pld	W	D	L	GF	GA	GD	BP	Pts	Qualification
1	Deportivo Purificación	8	6	1	1	20	8	+12	1	20	Liguilla de Filiales
2	CAFESSA	8	6	1	1	19	7	+12	1	20	Liguilla de Ascenso
3	Real Ánimas de Sayula	8	4	2	2	18	14	+4	2	16	Liguilla de Ascenso
4	Gambeta	8	4	2	2	14	11	+3	1	15	Liguilla de Ascenso
5	Deportivo El Grullo	8	4	2	2	20	13	+7	0	14	
6	Atlético Punto Sur	8	4	2	2	20	16	+4	0	14	
7	Atlético Cuauhtémoc	8	3	2	3	14	10	+4	1	12	
8	Loros UdeC	8	2	3	3	9	17	−8	3	12	
9	Caja Oblatos	8	3	2	3	13	11	+2	0	11	
10	CAR Toros	8	1	2	5	4	18	−14	1	6	
11	Progreso de Cocula	8	1	0	7	9	19	−10	0	3	
12	Elite Darka	8	0	1	7	3	19	−16	0	1	

Updated to match(es) played on 15 November 2026. Source: Liga TDP

== Group 15 ==
Group with 12 teams from Colima and Jalisco.

Location of teams in the 2026–27 Liga TDP Group 15

Team	City	Home ground	Capacity
Atlético Tesistán	Zapopan, Jalisco	Club Pumas Tesistán	500
Deportivo Fuerza Huracán (Note: Loan of Fénix CFAR.)	San Isidro Mazatepec, Jalisco	La Fortaleza	1,000
Diablos Tesistán	Zapopan, Jalisco	Club Diablos Tesistán	1,000
Eibar Mexiko (Note: Team affiliated with Eibar.) (Note: Loan of Volcanes de Colima.)	Tlajomulco de Zúñiga, Jalisco	Quinta Fátima	500
Gallos Viejos	Zapopan, Jalisco	Nápoles FC	500
GDL United (Note: Loan of Deportivo Aviña.)	Zapopan, Jalisco	Centro de Alto Rendimiento Tapatíos	1,000
Guadalajara TDP (Note: Team affiliated with Guadalajara.)	Zapopan, Jalisco	Chivas Gigantera 1	500
Legado del Centenario	Guadalajara, Jalisco	Unidad Deportiva Cuauhtémoc	1,000
Oro	Ameca, Jalisco	Núcleo Deportivo y de Espectáculos Ameca	6,000
Sporting AKD (Note: Loan of Castores Gobrantacto.)	Zapopan, Jalisco	Nápoles FC	500
Tecos	Zapopan, Jalisco	Distrito UAG	1,000
Tornados Tlaquepaque (Note: Team affiliated with Guerreros de Autlán.) (Note: Loan of Guerreros de Autlán–Tlaquepaque.)	Tlajomulco de Zúñiga, Jalisco	Club Pumitas Arceo	500

=== League table ===
Pos	Team	Pld	W	D	L	GF	GA	GD	BP	Pts	Qualification
1	Diablos Tesistán	8	7	0	1	22	10	+12	0	21	Liguilla de Ascenso
2	Guadalajara TDP	8	5	1	2	17	10	+7	1	17	Liguilla de Filiales
3	Tecos	8	5	1	2	15	6	+9	0	16	Liguilla de Filiales
4	Atlético Tesistán	8	5	1	2	16	9	+7	0	16	Liguilla de Ascenso
5	Oro	8	4	2	2	14	10	+4	2	16	Liguilla de Ascenso
6	Gallos Viejos	8	3	2	3	17	13	+4	1	12	Liguilla de Ascenso
7	Tornados Tlaquepaque	8	3	2	3	8	12	−4	1	12	
8	Sporting AKD	8	3	1	4	18	18	0	0	10	
9	GDL United	8	2	1	5	6	16	−10	1	8	
10	Eibar Mexiko	8	2	1	5	8	15	−7	0	7	
11	Legado del Centenario	7	1	2	4	7	12	−5	1	6	
12	Deportivo Fuerza Huracán	7	0	0	7	4	21	−17	0	0	

Updated to match(es) played on 15 November 2026. Source: Liga TDP

== Group 16 ==
Group with 11 teams from Jalisco, Nayarit and Sinaloa.

=== Teams ===
Location of teams in the 2026–27 Liga TDP Group 16 (Nayarit)
Location of teams in the 2026–27 Liga TDP Group 16 (Jalisco and Sinaloa)

Team	City	Home ground	Capacity
Atlético Acaponeta	Acaponeta, Nayarit	Unidad Deportiva Acaponeta	1,000
Atlético Nayarit	Tepic, Nayarit	Hilario "Diablo" Díaz	1,000
Dorados de Sinaloa TDP (Note: Team affiliated with Dorados de Sinaloa.)	Mazatlán, Sinaloa	Cancha Anexa Estadio El Encanto	1,000
Halcones de Nayarit	Tepic, Nayarit	Halcones	1,000
Naayari	Tepic, Nayarit	Ejido 6 de Enero	500
Puerto Vallarta	Bahía de Banderas, Nayarit	Ciudad Deportiva San José del Valle	4,000
Real Refineros TDP (Note: Team affiliated with Real Refineros CDS.)	Tlajomulco de Zúñiga, Jalisco	Complejo Deportivo Bari	500
Sufacen Tepic	Tepic, Nayarit	Club Deportivo Sufacen	1,000
Tigres de Álica TDP (Note: Team affiliated with Tigres de Álica.)	Tepic, Nayarit	Nicolás Álvarez Ortega	12,271
VADS	Tepic, Nayarit	Halcones	1,000
Xalisco	Xalisco, Nayarit	Unidad Deportiva Landareñas	1,500

=== League table ===
Pos	Team	Pld	W	D	L	GF	GA	GD	BP	Pts	Qualification
1	Real Refineros TDP	7	4	2	1	17	6	+11	1	15	Liguilla de Filiales
2	Atlético Acaponeta	7	4	1	2	15	13	+2	1	14	Liguilla de Filiales
3	Dorados de Sinaloa TDP	6	4	1	1	15	7	+8	0	13	Liguilla de Filiales
4	Naayari	7	4	1	2	14	8	+6	0	13	
5	Xalisco	6	3	2	1	14	10	+4	2	13	Liguilla de Ascenso
6	Tigres de Álica TDP	6	3	2	1	13	8	+5	1	12	Liguilla de Filiales
7	Halcones de Nayarit	7	3	1	3	16	13	+3	1	11	Liguilla de Ascenso
8	Atlético Nayarit	7	2	3	2	9	8	+1	0	9	
9	Puerto Vallarta	6	1	1	4	8	17	−9	1	5	
10	Sufacen Tepic	6	1	0	5	11	17	−6	0	3	
11	VADS	7	0	0	7	2	27	−25	0	0	

Updated to match(es) played on 15 November 2026. Source: Liga TDP

== Group 17 ==
Group with 15 teams from Coahuila, Durango, Nuevo León and Tamaulipas.

=== Teams ===
Location of teams in the 2026–27 Liga TDP Group 17 (Nuevo León)
Location of teams in the 2026–27 Liga TDP Group 17 (Coahuila and Durango)
Location of teams in the 2026–27 Liga TDP Group 17 (Tamaulipas)

Team	City	Home ground	Capacity
Académicos de la SEED (Note: Loan of Fut–Car.)	Gómez Palacio, Durango	Unidad Deportiva Francisco Gómez Palacio	4,000
Cadereyta	Cadereyta, Nuevo León	Clemente Salinas Netro	1,000
Calor Torreón (Note: Team affiliated with Calor.)	Ciudad Lerdo, Durango	Polideportivo Lerdo 2024	1,000
Correcaminos UAT TDP (Note: Team affiliated with Correcaminos UAT.)	Ciudad Victoria, Tamaulipas	Eugenio Alvizo Porras	5,000
Cuervos Tec Nuevo León (Note: Loan of Gallos Nuevo León.)	Guadalupe, Nuevo León	Instituto Tecnológico de Nuevo León	1,000
Escobedo (Note: Loan of Real San Cosme.)	General Escobedo, Nuevo León	Deportivo Lázaro Cárdenas	1,000
Guerreros Reynosa	Reynosa, Tamaulipas	Unidad Deportiva Solidaridad	15,000
Halcones de Saltillo	Saltillo, Coahuila	Olímpico Francisco I. Madero	7,000
Inter Nuevo León (Note: Loan of San Pedro 7–10.)	San Pedro Garza García, Nuevo León	Sporti Valle Poniente	500
Irritilas	San Pedro, Coahuila	Quinta Ximena	1,000
Leones de Nuevo León	Guadalupe, Nuevo León	CEDEREG	1,000
Nuevo León	San Nicolás de los Garza, Nuevo León	Unidad Deportiva Oriente	1,000
Real Apodaca TDP (Note: Team affiliated with Real Apodaca.)	Apodaca, Nuevo León	Centenario del Ejército Mexicano	2,000
Santiago TDP (Note: Team affiliated with Santiago.)	Santiago, Nuevo León	FCD El Barrial	1,300
T-Rex de Ramos Arizpe (Note: Loan of Querétaro 3D.)	Ramos Arizpe, Coahuila	Unidad Deportiva Ramos Arizpe	1,000

=== League table ===
Pos	Team	Pld	W	D	L	GF	GA	GD	BP	Pts	Qualification
1	Santiago TDP	10	8	1	1	28	6	+22	1	26	Liguilla de Filiales
2	Halcones de Saltillo	10	7	2	1	22	5	+17	2	25	Liguilla de Ascenso
3	Calor Torreón	11	8	1	2	24	11	+13	0	25	Liguilla de Filiales
4	Cadereyta	9	5	3	1	21	10	+11	2	20	Liguilla de Ascenso
5	Irritilas	10	5	3	2	10	4	+6	1	19	Liguilla de Ascenso
6	Correcaminos UAT TDP	10	6	0	4	16	7	+9	0	18	
7	Guerreros Reynosa	10	5	2	3	15	10	+5	1	18	Liguilla de Ascenso
8	T-Rex de Ramos Arizpe	11	4	4	3	23	17	+6	1	17	
9	Inter Nuevo León	10	3	1	6	6	10	−4	1	11	
10	Escobedo	10	3	1	6	9	20	−11	1	11	
11	Real Apodaca TDP	10	3	1	6	11	18	−7	0	10	
12	Académicos de la SEED	10	3	0	7	8	17	−9	0	9	
13	Nuevo León	10	2	1	7	8	21	−13	1	8	
14	Cuervos Tec Nuevo León	9	1	1	7	8	25	−17	0	4	
15	Leones de Nuevo León	10	1	1	8	6	34	−28	0	4	

Updated to match(es) played on 18 November 2026. Source: Liga TDP

== Group 18 ==
Group with 11 teams from Baja California, Chihuahua and Sonora.

=== Teams ===
Location of teams in the 2026–27 Liga TDP Group 18

Team	City	Home ground	Capacity
Atlético Tijuana	Tijuana, Baja California	Unidad Deportiva Reforma	1,000
Cachanillas	Mexicali, Baja California	Campo Necaxa	1,000
Cobras Fut Premier	Ciudad Juárez, Chihuahua	20 de Noviembre	2,500
Datileros de San Luis RC	San Luis Río Colorado, Sonora	El Musical	1,000
Delfines Baja	Tecate, Baja California	Campo Los Encinos	1,000
Etchojoa	Etchojoa, Sonora	Trigueros	1,500
La Tribu de Ciudad Juárez TDP (Note: Team affiliated with La Tribu de Ciudad Juárez.)	Ciudad Juárez, Chihuahua	Complejo La Tribu	500
Obson Dynamo	Ciudad Obregón, Sonora	Hundido ITSON	2,000
Soles de Sonora	Hermosillo, Sonora	Miguel Castro Servín	4,000
Sporting de Sonora	Nogales, Sonora	Jesús "JEGAR" García	1,000
Xolos Hermosillo (Note: Team affiliated with Tijuana.)	Hermosillo, Sonora	Miguel Castro Servín	4,000

=== League table ===
Pos	Team	Pld	W	D	L	GF	GA	GD	BP	Pts	Qualification
1	Xolos Hermosillo	7	5	1	1	15	11	+4	0	16	Liguilla de Filiales
2	Datileros de San Luis RC	7	4	1	2	20	11	+9	1	14	Liguilla de Ascenso
3	Sporting de Sonora	7	4	2	1	16	9	+7	0	14	Liguilla de Ascenso
4	Soles de Sonora	6	4	1	1	11	4	+7	1	14	Liguilla de Ascenso
5	Atlético Tijuana	7	4	1	2	10	6	+4	0	13	Liguilla de Ascenso
6	Etchojoa	8	2	4	2	14	17	−3	2	12	
7	Obson Dynamo	6	3	1	2	15	9	+6	1	11	
8	Cachanillas	8	2	2	4	11	18	−7	1	9	
9	La Tribu de Ciudad Juárez TDP	7	2	1	4	7	9	−2	1	8	
10	Delfines Baja	7	1	1	5	6	15	−9	1	5	
11	Cobras Fut Premier	8	0	1	7	7	23	−16	0	1	

Updated to match(es) played on 15 November 2026. Source: Liga TDP

== Promotion Play–offs ==
The Promotion Play–offs will consist of seven phases. Classify 64 teams, the number varies according to the number of teams in each group, being between three and eight clubs per group. The country will be divided into two zones: Zone A (Groups 1 to 9) and Zone B (Groups 10 to 18). Eliminations will be held according to the average obtained by each team, being ordered from best to worst by their percentage throughout the season.

As of 2020–21 season, the names of the knockout stages were modified as follows: Round of 32, Round of 16, Quarter-finals, Semifinals, Zone Finals and Campeón de Campeones (Zone champion's trophy), this as a consequence of the division of the country into two zones, for so the teams only face clubs from the same region until the final match.

== Reserve and Development Teams ==
Each season a table is created among those teams that don't have the right to promote, because they are considered as reserve teams for teams that play in Liga MX, Liga de Expansión and Liga Premier or are independent teams that have requested not to participate for the Promotion due to the fact that they are footballers development projects. The ranking order is determined through the "quotient", which is obtained by dividing the points obtained between the disputed matches, being ordered from highest to lowest. Since the 2025–26 season, the league decided to divide these teams into two regions, as it happens with the promotion play-offs, so in the final phase the teams will only face rivals from their region, until reaching the national final, which will pit the two regional champions of this modality of the league against each other.

=== Tables ===
Zone A

P	Team	Pts	G	Pts/G	GD
1	Racing de Veracruz TDP	29	11	2.636	+26
2	América TDP	24	10	2.400	+30
3	Pachuca TDP	26	11	2.364	+23
4	CDM	21	9	2.333	+14
5	Héroes de Zaci Hidalgo	23	10	2.300	+12
6	Boston Cancún	16	7	2.286	+7
7	Héroes de Zaci CDMX	22	10	2.200	+10
8	Chapulineros de Oaxaca TDP	24	11	2.182	+11
9	Guerreros del Pacífico TDP	21	10	2.100	+9
10	Montañeses Potros Casino Español	21	10	2.100	+7
11	Jaiba Brava TDP	23	11	2.091	+26
12	Piratas Poza Rica	20	10	2.000	+5
13	Napoli Tabasco	21	11	1.909	+6
14	Delfines Universidad de Sotavento	20	11	1.818	+3
15	Artesanos Metepec TDP	20	11	1.818	0
16	Alebrijes CDMX	18	10	1.800	+7
17	Deportiva Venados TDP	14	8	1.750	+2
18	Mineros Carranza CDMX	17	10	1.700	+3
19	Olimpo	15	9	1.667	+5
20	Piratas Minatitlán	18	11	1.636	+11
21	Cóndor	16	10	1.600	+4
22	Tapachula TDP	15	10	1.500	0
23	Mineros CDMX	15	10	1.500	–3
24	Dragones de Oaxaca TDP	15	11	1.364	–1
25	Alebrijes de Oaxaca TDP	13	10	1.300	0
26	Pioneros Junior	10	8	1.250	–2
27	Balam	12	10	1.200	–4
28	Jaguares TDP	9	8	1.125	–5
29	Cordobés TDP	11	10	1.100	–3
30	Inter Playa TDP	7	8	0.875	–3
32	Artesanos Huixquilucan	9	11	0.818	–12
31	Alebrijes Teotihuacán	9	11	0.818	–14
33	Nicolás Romero	7	10	0.700	–18
34	Atlético Hidalgo TDP	5	10	0.500	–40
35	CEFAR Azul Iztacalco	4	11	0.364	–33
36	Aragón	3	10	0.300	–16
37	Cuemanco	3	10	0.300	–34

Last updated: 18 November 2026
Source: Liga TDP
P = Position; G = Games played; Pts = Points; Pts/G = Ratio of points to games played; GD = Goal difference

Zone B

P	Team	Pts	G	Pts/G	GD
1	Atlético Morelia–UMSNH	18	6	3.000	+15
2	Gorilas de Juanacatlán	21	8	2.625	+15
3	Gorilas TDP	26	10	2.600	+22
4	Santiago TDP	26	10	2.600	+22
5	Deportivo Purificación	20	8	2.500	+12
6	Leones Negros UdeG TDP	19	8	2.375	+10
7	ACF Zapotlanejo TDP	19	8	2.375	+6
8	Xolos Hermosillo	16	7	2.286	+4
9	Calor Torreón	25	11	2.273	+13
10	Dorados de Sinaloa TDP	13	6	2.167	+8
11	Real Refineros TDP	15	7	2.143	+11
12	Guadalajara TDP	17	8	2.125	+7
13	Tecos	16	8	2.000	+9
14	Mineros de Zacatecas TDP	20	10	2.000	+8
15	Tigres de Álica TDP	12	6	2.000	+5
16	Atlético Acaponeta	14	7	2.000	+2
17	Naayari	13	7	1.857	+6
18	Purépechas TDP	13	7	1.857	+1
19	Tuzos UAZ	20	11	1.818	+13
20	Lobos ULMX TDP	18	10	1.800	+12
21	Correcaminos UAT TDP	18	10	1.800	+9
22	Atlético Cuauhtémoc	12	8	1.500	+4
23	Tornados Tlaquepaque	12	8	1.500	–4
24	Loros UdeC	12	8	1.500	–8
25	León GEN	14	10	1.400	+5
26	Caja Oblatos	11	8	1.375	+2
27	Atlético Nayarit	9	7	1.286	+1
28	Cajeteros Celaya	11	9	1.222	–3
29	Necaxa TDP	12	10	1.200	+6
30	Aguacateros CDU	7	6	1.167	–1
31	La Tribu de Ciudad Juárez TDP	8	7	1.143	–2
32	Real Apodaca TDP	10	10	1.000	–7
33	Sufacen Tepic	3	6	0.500	–6
34	Progreso de Cocula	3	8	0.375	–10
35	VADS	0	7	0.000	–25

Last updated: 15 November 2026
Source: Liga TDP
P = Position; G = Games played; Pts = Points; Pts/G = Ratio of points to games played; GD = Goal difference

== Regular season statistics ==
=== Top goalscorers ===
Players sorted first by goals scored, then by last name.

Rank	Player	Club	Goals
1	(Mexico) Felipe García	Trinca de Mi Vida	24
2	(Mexico) Henry Vázquez	Universidad del Sureste	17
3	(Mexico) Rodolfo González	Jaiba Brava TDP	15
4	(Mexico) Gael Lozano	Instituto de Fútbol de Alta Competencia	13
4	(Mexico) Daniel Michel	Villa	13
4	(Mexico) José Sánchez	Gorilas TDP	13
7	(Mexico) Guillermo López	Trinca de Mi Vida	12
7	(Mexico) Leonardo Mora	Magos del Rincón	12
7	(Mexico) Uriel Villegas	Cuemanco	12
10	(Mexico) Rodrigo de la Cruz	Alebrijes CDMX	11
10	(Mexico) Fabrizio Gómez	CH Fútbol Club	11
10	(Mexico) Ángel Silva	Cóndor	11

Source:Liga TDP

== See also ==
- 2026–27 Liga MX season
- 2026–27 Liga de Expansión MX season
- 2026–27 Primera Premier season
- 2026–27 Liga Premier A season
- 2026–27 Liga Premier B season
