= 2025–26 Serie A de México season =

Serie A de México
- Season: 2025–26
- Champions: Deportiva Venados (1st title)
- Promoted: Guerreros de Autlán; Héroes de Zaci; Santiago
- Matches: 520
- Goals: 1,485 (2.86 per match)
- Top goalscorer: Francisco Castañeda (27 goals)
- Biggest home win: Deportiva Venados 8–1 Dragones Toluca (15 November 2025)
- Biggest away win: Atlético Hidalgo 0–7 Halcones (14 November 2025)
- Highest scoring: Guerreros de Autlán 4–5 Leones Negros (10 November 2025)
- Longest winning run: 10 matches Tigres de Álica
- Longest unbeaten run: 24 matches Racing de Veracruz
- Longest winless run: 13 matches Atlético Hidalgo
- Longest losing run: 8 matches Atlético Hidalgo
- Highest attendance: 7,771; Celaya vs Pioneros de Cancún (23 August 2025)
- Lowest attendance: 30; Racing de Veracruz vs Cañoneros (10 April 2026); Tuzos UAZ vs Ensenada (11 April 2026)
- Total attendance: 440,339
- Average attendance: 862
- Stats are from the regular season only

The 2025–26 Serie A de México season is part of the third-tier football league of Mexico. The tournament began on 22 August 2025 and finished on 9 May 2026.

== Offseason Changes ==
- On May 3, 2025 Santiago was promoted from Serie B to Serie A.
- On May 31, 2025 Héroes de Zaci was promoted from Liga TDP to Serie A.
- On June 1, 2025 Guerreros de Autlán was promoted from Liga TDP to Serie A.
- On June 12, 2025 Faraones de Texcoco went on hiatus due to financial and institutional problems.
- On June 19, 2025 Irapuato was promoted to Liga de Expansión MX as a guest team.
- On June 27, 2025, the league format was modified, the single-season tournament was reinstated after one year with two tournaments per season.
- On June 27, 2025 Cordobés was promoted to Serie A from Serie B as an expansion team.
- On June 27, 2025 Calor returned to Serie A after a one-year stay at Serie B, however to be able to participate in Serie A, the team was relocated to Reynosa.
- On June 27, 2025 Chapulineros de Oaxaca rejoined the league as an expansion team, previously they played at the Liga de Balompié Mexicano.
- On June 27, 2025 Celaya joined the league as expansion team, however, the team will not be eligible for promotion because it was founded as a reserves squad of the Liga de Expansión team.
- On June 27, 2025 Agricultores de Guasave was renamed Ensenada F.C.
- On June 27, 2025 Atlético Pachuca was promoted to Serie A from Serie B as an expansion team, however, the team was renamed Atlético Hidalgo.
- On June 27, 2025 Mexicali was relocated to Toluca and renamed Dragones Toluca.
- On June 27, 2025 Lobos ULMX became an independent team, they acted as a Celaya reserves team between 2021 and 2025.
- On June 27, 2025, Acatlán returned to Zapotlanejo after being forced to play in Arandas during the previous tournament due to damage to their original stadium. On July 31 they were renamed ACF Zapotlanejo.
- On July 16, 2025 Aguacateros de Peribán went on hiatus because the team's management prefers to wait until the completion of its new stadium to avoid problems with the approval of its field as occurred at the end of the previous season.
- On July 28, 2025 Cordobés was relocated from Huixquilucan to Cuautitlán.
- On July 31, 2025 Petroleros de Salamanca went on hiatus due to financial problems.
- On July 31, 2025 Aguacateros CDU returned to Serie B due to administrative decisions of the club.
- On July 31, 2025 Cañoneros and Ciervos were promoted to Serie A as expansion teams.
- On July 31, 2025 Halcones was relocated from Querétaro City to Uruapan.

=== Mid–season changes ===
- Since Week 14 Chilpancingo moved to the Estadio Universitario UAGro due to the remodeling of the Polideportivo General Vicente Guerrero.

== Regular season ==
The member clubs of the Serie A for the 2025–26 season are listed as follows.

=== Group 1 ===
==== Stadium and locations ====
Location of teams in the 2025–26 Serie A Group 1

Club	Manager	City	Stadium	Capacity	Affiliate	Kit manufacturer	Shirt sponsor(s) front
ACF Zapotlanejo	(Mexico) Gandhi Vega	Zapotlanejo, Jalisco	Miguel Hidalgo	1,800	–	Silver Sport	–
Alacranes de Durango	(Mexico) Héctor Jair Real	Durango City, Durango	Francisco Zarco	18,000	–	Keuka	#WeAreOne
Cimarrones de Sonora	(Mexico) Valentín Arredondo	Hermosillo, Sonora	Héroe de Nacozari	18,747	–	Sporelli	PIPESO, Hospital San Diego
Colima	(Mexico) Juan Cordero (interim)	Colima City, Colima	Colima	12,000	–	Reator	Forma Interior
Ensenada	(Mexico) José Monzón	Ensenada, Baja California	Raúl Ramírez Lozano	7,600	–	DONY	Grupo EYP
Guerreros de Autlán	(Mexico) Sergio Díaz	Autlán, Jalisco	Unidad Deportiva Chapultepec	1,500	–	Obliqua	Sicarx, Autlán, Robles Llantas y Servicios, Harfi
La Piedad	(Mexico) Ulises Sánchez	La Piedad, Michoacán	Juan N. López	13,356	–	Silver Sport	Bet Gigante, Packlife, Expo Cerámicas, SMRTV, Kilker
Leones Negros UdeG	(Mexico) Jairo González	Zapopan, Jalisco	Instalaciones Club Deportivo U.de G. Cancha 3	3,000	Leones Negros UdeG	Keuka	Electrolit
Los Cabos United	(Mexico) Edson Alvarado	Los Cabos, Baja California Sur	Complejo Don Koll	3,500	–	Capelli Sport	Cabo Wabo
Mineros de Fresnillo	(Mexico) Jorge Horta	Fresnillo, Zacatecas	Unidad Deportiva Minera Fresnillo (Note: The team plays some matches at Estadio Carlos Vega Villalba, Zacatecas)	5,000	Mineros de Zacatecas	Spiro	Fresnillo
Tecos	(Mexico) Jesús Chávez	Zapopan, Jalisco	Tres de Marzo	18,779	–	Marval	Jumex Sport
Tigres de Álica	(Mexico) Irving Rubirosa	Tepic, Nayarit	Nicolás Álvarez Ortega	12,495	–	In–house	Coca–Cola
Tritones Vallarta	(Mexico) Ricardo Jiménez	Puerto Vallarta, Jalisco	Club Deportivo Curiel	1,000	–	Marval	–
Tuzos UAZ	(Mexico) Rubén Hernández	Zacatecas City, Zacatecas	Carlos Vega Villalba	20,068	–	Spiro	Fresnillo

==== Standings ====
Pos	Team	Pld	W	D	L	GF	GA	GD	BP	Pts	Qualification or relegation
1	Alacranes de Durango	26	21	2	3	71	16	+55	9	74	Liguilla de Ascenso Quarter–finals
2	Tigres de Álica	26	16	4	6	46	25	+21	4	56	Liguilla de Ascenso Reclassification
3	Cimarrones de Sonora	26	14	8	4	46	19	+27	4	54	Liguilla de Filiales
4	Leones Negros	26	16	2	8	42	26	+16	3	53	Liguilla de Filiales
5	Tecos	26	14	4	8	49	34	+15	3	49	Liguilla de Ascenso Reclassification
6	Tritones Vallarta	26	13	3	10	32	27	+5	4	46	Liguilla de Ascenso Reclassification
7	Mineros de Fresnillo	26	10	7	9	40	41	−1	2	39	Liguilla de Filiales
8	Los Cabos United	26	11	3	12	37	40	−3	1	37	
9	Guerreros de Autlán	26	8	7	11	37	42	−5	1	32	
10	Tuzos UAZ	26	8	4	14	32	48	−16	1	29	
11	Ensenada	26	8	2	16	30	55	−25	2	28	
12	La Piedad	26	6	3	17	39	66	−27	2	23	
13	ACF Zapotlanejo	26	6	2	18	39	73	−34	1	21	
14	Colima	26	4	3	19	24	52	−28	2	17	

Updated to match(es) played on 11 April 2026. Source: Liga Premier FMF

==== Positions by round ====
Leader and qualification to Liguilla semi-finals
Qualification to Reclassification
Possible qualification to Reclassification
Last place in table

Team ╲ Round	1	2	3	4	5	6	7	8	9	10	11	12	13	14	15	16	17	18	19	20	21	22	23	24	25	26
Alacranes de Durango	2	1	5	3	1	1	2	2	1	1	1	1	1	1	1	1	1	1	1	1	1	1	1	1	1	1
Tigres de Álica	6	5	4	5	5	7	7	8	8	9	7	6	5	4	4	4	4	3	2	2	3	2	3	4	2	2
Cimarrones de Sonora	4	3	3	4	7	3	3	4	4	4	3	4	3	3	2	2	3	4	4	4	2	3	2	2	3	3
Leones Negros	7	10	9	9	9	9	8	6	7	6	5	5	6	7	6	7	5	5	5	5	5	5	5	5	4	4
Tecos	3	7	7	7	6	5	4	3	2	2	2	2	2	2	3	3	2	2	3	3	4	4	4	3	5	5
Tritones Vallarta	1	2	2	1	3	6	5	5	6	5	6	8	7	5	5	5	6	6	6	6	6	6	6	6	6	6
Mineros de Fresnillo	9	11	11	12	10	11	12	11	10	10	10	10	10	10	8	9	9	9	8	8	7	8	8	8	7	7
Los Cabos United	5	4	1	2	2	2	1	1	3	3	4	3	4	6	7	6	7	7	7	7	8	7	7	7	8	8
Guerreros de Autlán	14	8	8	10	11	10	11	10	9	8	9	9	9	9	10	8	8	8	9	9	9	9	9	9	9	9
Tuzos UAZ	11	13	12	8	8	8	9	9	11	13	11	12	11	11	11	11	11	11	10	11	11	11	11	11	11	10
Ensenada	12	6	6	6	4	4	6	7	5	7	8	7	8	8	9	10	10	10	11	10	10	10	10	10	10	11
La Piedad	10	12	13	13	13	14	13	14	13	11	12	11	12	12	12	12	12	12	12	12	12	12	12	12	13	12
ACF Zapotlanejo	8	9	10	11	12	13	14	13	14	14	14	14	14	14	14	14	13	13	13	13	13	13	13	13	12	13
Colima	13	14	14	14	14	12	10	12	12	12	13	13	13	13	13	13	14	14	14	14	14	14	14	14	14	14

Updated to match(es) played on 29 March 2026. Source: Liga Premier FMF

==== Results ====
Home \ Away	ACF	CIM	COL	DUR	ENS	FRE	AUT	LPD	UDG	LCU	TEC	TIG	TRV	UAZ
ACF Zapotlanejo	—	0–4	1–3	0–3	0–3	2–2	3–0	1–3	2–3	4–2	0–2	1–2	3–2	4–2
Cimarrones de Sonora	4–1	—	2–0	0–0	7–2	1–0	1–1	0–0	1–0	2–0	1–2	1–0	1–0	3–1
Colima	3–4	0–0	—	1–4	4–1	0–0	1–2	3–0	0–2	1–5	1–4	0–1	0–2	0–1
Durango	5–1	1–1	1–3	—	6–0	2–1	5–0	3–1	1–0	2–1	3–1	0–1	2–0	3–0
Ensenada	0–1	0–1	1–0	0–3	—	0–3	1–0	6–1	1–4	1–2	2–5	1–2	3–0	0–0
Fresnillo	1–0	2–2	3–0	1–6	0–2	—	2–1	6–2	3–1	1–0	3–2	2–1	2–2	1–4
Guerreros de Autlán	3–1	1–1	2–0	0–1	3–0	1–1	—	3–1	4–5	1–1	1–2	2–1	0–1	1–0
La Piedad	4–4	2–3	3–2	0–5	3–1	2–2	3–0	—	1–2	0–1	2–3	0–2	0–2	3–0
Leones Negros	3–0	2–1	1–0	0–2	3–0	2–1	2–1	3–1	—	2–0	2–1	1–1	1–0	0–1
Los Cabos United	2–0	1–0	1–1	0–2	0–1	3–2	1–4	3–1	2–1	—	0–0	0–2	4–1	3–2
Tecos	4–3	2–1	3–1	2–4	1–1	3–0	1–1	4–1	1–2	3–1	—	1–1	2–0	1–0
Tigres de Álica	5–1	1–1	5–0	1–2	1–2	0–1	2–2	2–1	1–0	3–2	1–0	—	1–0	3–2
Tritones Vallarta	5–0	0–3	1–0	1–0	1–0	2–0	2–2	2–0	1–0	2–0	1–0	1–2	—	2–0
Tuzos UAZ	3–2	0–4	2–0	0–5	4–1	0–0	3–1	3–4	0–0	1–2	1–0	1–4	1–1	—

Updated to match(es) played on 11 April 2026. Source: Liga Premier FMF
Legend: Blue = home team win; Yellow = draw; Red = away team win.

=== Group 2 ===
==== Stadium and locations ====
Location of teams in the 2025–26 Serie A Group 2

Club	Manager	City	Stadium	Capacity	Affiliate	Kit manufacturer	Shirt sponsor(s) front
Atlético Hidalgo	(Mexico) Fausto Pinto	Atitalaquía, Hidalgo	Municipal de Atitalaquía	3,000	Pachuca	Algatt	–
Calor	(Mexico) Humberto Martínez	Reynosa, Tamaulipas	Unidad Deportiva Solidaridad	15,000	–	Mayelos Uniformes	Grupo Iglesias, Blanquita, Aphaka Promotora, Reynosa
Chilpancingo	(Chile) Héctor Mancilla	Chilpancingo, Guerrero	Universitario UAGro (Note: The team played the first half of the season at Polideportivo General Vicente Guerrero, Chilpancingo)	2,000	–	JAG Sportswear	Intelecta Trading Group, Risval Corporation, Creactivos, Latam Business Academy
Ciervos	(Mexico) Arturo Viche	Chalco, State of Mexico	Arreola	3,217	–	Corsa	GOCA
Cordobés	(Mexico) Francisco Flores	Cuautitlán, State of Mexico	Los Pinos	5,000	–	JAG Sportswear	El Heraldo de México
Gavilanes de Matamoros	(Mexico) Enrique Garza	Matamoros, Tamaulipas	El Hogar	22,000	–	Mayelos Uniformes	Ho Gar, Blanquita, Corefame, Notaría Pública 130, Coca-Cola
Halcones	(Mexico) Rodolfo Vilchis (Note: Rodolfo Vilchis was registered as manager due to regulatory issues, however, he shares the position with Marco Angúlo, who was officially registered as an assistant, due to he already managed a Serie A team during the season.)	Uruapan, Michoacán	Unidad Deportiva Hermanos López Rayón	5,000	–	DONY	AXEN Capital
Lobos ULMX	(Colombia) Aquivaldo Mosquera	Celaya, Guanajuato	Miguel Alemán Valdés	23,182	–	Keuka	TV4, Hampton Inn Celaya, Diesgas
Real Apodaca	(Mexico) Ricardo Rayas	Apodaca, Nuevo León	Centenario del Ejército Mexicano	2,000	–	Edcor	Financiera Altitud
Santiago	(Mexico) Martín Moreno	Allende, Nuevo León	La Capilla Soccer Park (Note: The team also plays some matches at the Cancha FCD El Barrial, Santiago, Nuevo León)	1,000	–	Keuka	Trayecto GTM Larmex
Sporting Canamy	(Mexico) Juan Carlos Rico	Oaxtepec, Morelos	Olímpico de Oaxtepec	9,000	–	In–house	Auto Haus Rent
UAT	(Mexico) Jorge Urbina	Ciudad Victoria, Tamaulipas	Eugenio Alvizo Porras (Note: The team also plays some matches at the Estadio Marte R. Gómez)	5,000	UAT	JAG Sportswear	–
Zacatepec	(Mexico) Rowan Vargas	Xochitepec, Morelos	Mariano Matamoros	16,000	–	Sporelli	–
Zitácuaro	(Mexico) Mario Trejo	Zitácuaro, Michoacán	Ignacio López Rayón	10,000	–	Briseño Sport	Grupo Orihuela

==== Standings ====
Pos	Team	Pld	W	D	L	GF	GA	GD	BP	Pts	Qualification or relegation
1	Real Apodaca	26	19	4	3	47	19	+28	5	66	Liguilla de Ascenso Quarter–finals
2	Santiago	26	14	8	4	43	21	+22	1	51	Liguilla de Ascenso Reclassification
3	Zacatepec	26	11	9	6	29	15	+14	3	45	Liguilla de Ascenso Reclassification
4	Halcones	26	11	7	8	44	27	+17	4	44	Liguilla de Ascenso Reclassification
5	Calor	26	12	8	6	37	26	+11	0	44	Liguilla de Ascenso Reclassification
6	Gavilanes de Matamoros	26	12	5	9	31	22	+9	3	44	
7	Lobos ULMX	26	11	6	9	33	28	+5	1	40	
8	UAT	26	9	7	10	27	25	+2	2	36	
9	Chilpancingo	26	9	8	9	33	41	−8	0	35	
10	Cordobés	26	7	7	12	29	30	−1	2	30	
11	Zitácuaro	26	5	11	10	22	31	−9	2	28	
12	Sporting Canamy	26	5	9	12	32	52	−20	2	26	
13	Ciervos	26	3	7	16	20	50	−30	2	18	
14	Atlético Hidalgo	26	3	6	17	22	62	−40	1	16	

Updated to match(es) played on 11 April 2026. Source: Liga Premier FMF

==== Positions by round ====
Leader and qualification to Liguilla semi-finals
Qualification to Reclassification
Possible qualification to Reclassification
Last place in table

Team ╲ Round	1	2	3	4	5	6	7	8	9	10	11	12	13	14	15	16	17	18	19	20	21	22	23	24	25	26
Real Apodaca	1	1	1	1	1	1	1	1	1	1	1	1	1	1	1	1	1	1	1	1	1	1	1	1	1	1
Santiago	3	3	2	2	2	2	2	2	2	2	3	3	3	4	5	5	4	3	3	2	2	4	4	2	2	2
Zacatepec	13	5	9	4	3	4	4	5	3	4	2	5	4	3	3	3	5	5	4	4	3	3	3	4	3	3
Halcones	11	11	4	5	8	7	7	10	9	6	4	2	2	2	4	2	2	2	2	3	4	2	2	3	4	4
Calor	4	2	3	3	4	3	3	3	4	3	5	8	5	6	6	7	7	8	7	6	6	6	7	7	7	5
Gavilanes de Matamoros	9	10	7	10	6	9	5	8	5	9	9	9	9	10	10	11	8	9	8	8	8	5	5	5	5	6
Lobos ULMX	12	7	8	11	11	8	9	7	10	7	6	4	6	7	7	6	6	6	5	7	7	8	6	6	6	7
UAT	5	6	5	6	5	5	6	4	6	8	7	6	8	5	2	4	3	4	6	5	5	7	8	8	8	8
Chilpancingo	2	8	10	8	10	12	11	12	11	10	10	10	10	9	9	10	10	11	11	11	10	9	9	9	9	9
Cordobés	6	9	11	9	7	6	8	6	8	11	11	11	11	11	11	8	9	7	9	9	9	10	11	10	10	10
Zitácuaro	7	4	6	7	9	11	12	11	12	12	12	12	12	12	12	12	12	12	12	10	11	12	12	12	12	11
Sporting Canamy	10	13	13	13	13	10	10	9	7	5	8	7	7	8	8	9	11	10	10	12	12	11	10	11	11	12
Ciervos	14	14	14	14	14	13	13	13	13	13	13	13	13	14	13	14	14	13	14	14	13	13	13	13	13	13
Atlético Hidalgo	8	12	12	12	12	14	14	14	14	14	14	14	14	13	14	13	13	14	13	13	14	14	14	14	14	

Updated to match(es) played on 11 April 2026. Source: Liga Premier FMF

==== Results ====
Home \ Away	ATH	CAL	CHI	CIE	COR	GAV	HAL	LUM	RAP	SAT	SCA	UAT	ZAC	ZIT
Atlético Hidalgo	—	2–0	0–1	2–2	0–3	1–0	0–7	1–3	0–2	1–2	3–4	1–1	1–1	1–3
Calor	2–1	—	4–0	3–1	2–2	2–0	1–0	4–1	1–2	2–1	1–1	0–0	0–0	0–0
Chilpancingo	3–1	1–1	—	1–1	2–1	1–0	3–2	1–2	0–3	1–1	5–2	2–1	0–3	1–1
Ciervos	2–2	1–2	1–2	—	0–0	0–2	0–2	1–0	0–3	1–2	1–3	2–1	2–2	1–1
Cordobés	3–0	1–2	3–1	3–0	—	1–3	0–2	0–1	0–1	0–1	3–2	2–0	1–0	1–1
Gavilanes de Matamoros	0–0	2–0	2–1	1–0	1–0	—	0–1	1–0	2–1	1–1	1–1	2–1	1–0	5–0
Halcones	4–0	1–1	0–0	2–1	1–1	4–3	—	3–0	0–1	4–0	1–1	0–0	1–1	2–2
Lobos ULMX	7–1	2–3	2–1	2–0	3–1	1–0	0–1	—	0–0	1–1	2–1	0–2	0–1	1–0
Real Apodaca	3–0	1–0	4–2	2–0	3–1	3–1	3–0	1–1	—	2–2	2–0	1–0	1–0	3–2
Santiago	3–0	1–0	3–0	5–0	1–0	1–0	3–1	1–1	3–0	—	1–1	0–2	0–1	1–0
Sporting Canamy	2–3	1–2	1–2	1–1	0–0	1–3	0–3	1–1	2–2	0–6	—	1–0	0–5	2–1
UAT	2–1	0–1	0–0	4–0	1–1	1–0	3–2	1–0	1–0	1–1	2–4	—	0–0	1–0
Zacatepec	2–0	3–2	1–1	2–0	1–0	0–0	2–0	0–0	0–1	0–1	0–0	3–2	—	1–0
Zitácuaro	0–0	1–1	1–1	0–2	1–1	0–0	1–0	1–2	1–2	1–1	2–1	1–0	1–0	—

Updated to match(es) played on 11 April 2026. Source: Liga Premier FMF
Legend: Blue = home team win; Yellow = draw; Red = away team win.

=== Group 3 ===
==== Stadium and locations ====
Location of teams in the 2025–26 Serie A Group 3

Club	Manager	City	Stadium	Capacity	Affiliate	Kit manufacturer	Shirt sponsor(s) front
Cañoneros	(Mexico) Carlos Cazarín	Xalapa, Veracruz	Antonio M. Quirasco	2,000	–	Pirma	Grupo EMSA, UGM Centro, AR
Celaya	(Mexico) Luis Fernando Soto	Celaya, Guanajuato	Miguel Alemán Valdés	23,182	–	Keuka	ICE México, Coca–Cola, Tropper, OKIP, Aquática y Danza, TV4
Chapulineros de Oaxaca	(Mexico) Jonathan Estrada	San Jerónimo Tlacochahuaya, Oaxaca	Independiente MRCI	6,000	–	In–house	MRCI
Deportiva Venados	(Mexico) Alfredo García Salmones	Tamanché, Yucatán	Alonso Diego Molina	2,500	–	Foursport	–
Dragones Toluca	(Mexico) Omar Ramírez	Zinacantepec, State of Mexico	Unidad Cultural SNTE Sección 17	1,000	–	Lineal Sport	SNTE Sección 17, COPASTE
Héroes de Zaci	(Mexico) Jorge Jiménez (interim)	Texcoco, State of Mexico	Municipal Claudio Suárez	4,500	–	Toro Sports	Funded PayRoll
Inter Playa del Carmen	(Mexico) José Luis Trejo	Playa del Carmen, Quintana Roo	Unidad Deportiva Mario Villanueva Madrid	7,500	–	Protactic	Playa del Carmen, BYD Playa del Carmen, Comex
Jaguares	(Mexico) Carlos Trejo	Tuxtla Gutiérrez, Chiapas	Víctor Manuel Reyna	29,001	–	Romed	Chiapas
Montañeses	(Mexico) Víctor Medina	Orizaba, Veracruz	Socum	7,000	–	Silver Sport	Fénix, TYASA
Neza	(Mexico) Ignacio Negrete	Ciudad Nezahualcóyotl, State of Mexico	Municipal Claudio Suárez	4,000	–	JAG Sportswear	–
Pioneros de Cancún	(Mexico) Alejandro Pérez	Cancún, Quintana Roo	Cancún 86	6,390	–	Kaan Sports	GOmart
Racing de Veracruz	(Mexico) Gastón Obledo	Boca del Río, Veracruz	Unidad Deportiva Hugo Sánchez	4,000	–	Hummel	
Tapachula	(Mexico) Diego Mazariegos	Tapachula, Chiapas	Olímpico de Tapachula	18,017	–	Sporelli	Megacable

==== Standings ====
Pos	Team	Pld	W	D	L	GF	GA	GD	BP	Pts	Qualification or relegation
1	Racing de Veracruz	24	21	3	0	55	9	+46	5	71	Liguilla de Ascenso Quarter–finals
2	Deportiva Venados (C)	24	14	6	4	61	25	+36	4	52	Liguilla de Ascenso Reclassification
3	Tapachula	24	13	1	10	51	35	+16	4	44	Liguilla de Ascenso Reclassification
4	Celaya	24	11	6	7	42	32	+10	4	43	Liguilla de Filiales
5	Inter Playa del Carmen	24	11	7	6	35	28	+7	2	42	Liguilla de Ascenso Reclassification
6	Montañeses	24	10	4	10	35	28	+7	4	38	
7	Pioneros de Cancún	24	9	5	10	35	35	0	3	35	
8	Jaguares	24	9	7	8	33	32	+1	0	34	
9	Héroes de Zaci	24	10	3	11	33	46	−13	1	34	
10	Chapulineros de Oaxaca	24	4	9	11	21	33	−12	2	23	
11	Cañoneros	24	5	4	15	25	49	−24	3	22	
12	Neza	24	5	2	17	25	73	−48	2	19	
13	Dragones Toluca	24	4	3	17	21	47	−26	2	17	

Updated to match(es) played on 11 April 2026. Source: Liga Premier FMF
(C) Champions

==== Positions by round ====
Leader and qualification to Liguilla semi-finals
Qualification to Reclassification
Possible qualification to Reclassification
Last place in table

Team ╲ Round	1	2	3	4	5	6	7	8	9	10	11	12	13	14	15	16	17	18	19	20	21	22	23	24	25	26
Racing de Veracruz	1	1	1	1	1^{†}	1	1	1	1	1	1	1	1	1	1	1	1	1^{†}	1	1	1	1	1	1	1	1
Deportiva Venados	8^{†}	4	8	5	3	3	4	3	3	2	2	2	2	2^{†}	2	3	3	3	3	3	3	3	2	2	2	2
Tapachula	5	8	9^{†}	11	8	6	6	6	8	10	10	10	6	4	5	7^{†}	8	6	7	7	8	7	5	5	5	3
Celaya	2	2	2	3	7	8	10	10	11^{†}	9	8	3	3	3	3	2	2	2	2	2	2	2^{†}	3	3	3	4
Inter Playa del Carmen	7	3	6	6	4	2	3	2	2	4	6	8	9^{†}	7	6	5	4	4	4	4	4	4	4	4	4	5^{†}
Montañeses	6	10^{†}	5	7	6	4	5	5	5	6	4	6	7	9	10^{†}	9	6	8	6	5	6	8	8	6	6	6
Pioneros de Cancún	12	6	4	2	5	7^{†}	8	9	7	7	5	7	8	10	8	6	7	5	8^{†}	8	7	5	6	7	7	7
Jaguares	10	12	13	13^{†}	12	9	7	7	6	3	3	4	5	5	4	4	5^{†}	7	5	6	5	6	7	8	8	8
Héroes de Zaci	4	5	3	4	2	5	2	4	4	5	9^{†}	5	4	6	7	8	9	9	10	10	10	9	9	9^{†}	9	9
Chapulineros de Oaxaca	3	9	7	10	11	12	13^{†}	13	13	12	11	11	11	8	9	10	10	10	9	9^{†}	9	10	10	10	10	10
Cañoneros	9	11	11	12	13	13	11	12^{†}	10	11	12	12	12	12	12	12	13	13	13	13	13^{†}	12	11	11	11	11
Neza	11	13	12	9	10	11	9	8	9	8	7	9^{†}	10	11	11	11	11	11	11	11	11	11	12	12	12^{†}	12
Dragones Toluca	13	7	10	8	9	10	12	11	12	13^{†}	13	13	13	13	13	13	12	12	12	12	12	13	13^{†}	13	13	13

Updated to match(es) played on 22 March 2026. Source: Liga Premier FMF
Notes: † indicates team rested that round

==== Results ====
Home \ Away	CAÑ	CEL	CHA	DVE	DRT	HER	INP	JAG	MON	NEZ	PIO	RVE	TAP
Cañoneros	—	3–3	1–2	0–4	1–0	5–0	2–2	0–1	0–0	3–2	2–2	0–3	1–2
Celaya	3–0	—	1–0	1–2	3–2	4–0	0–0	1–1	1–0	6–0	3–1	0–1	2–2
Chapulineros de Oaxaca	1–0	0–0	—	1–1	0–0	1–2	3–1	2–2	0–2	1–1	1–1	0–0	1–3
Deportiva Venados	1–0	1–1	5–1	—	8–1	2–2	1–2	4–1	3–0	7–1	2–2	0–2	3–1
Dragones Toluca	0–3	0–2	2–0	0–1	—	1–1	0–0	0–1	0–1	0–2	2–0	1–2	2–4
Héroes de Zaci	3–1	3–2	1–1	1–4	0–4	—	3–2	1–0	1–0	3–1	0–2	0–3	2–1
Inter Playa del Carmen	1–0	0–2	2–1	0–0	3–0	4–0	—	3–3	2–2	4–0	1–2	0–1	1–0
Jaguares	1–0	0–1	0–0	2–1	2–1	1–0	0–1	—	3–3	2–1	4–2	1–1	1–3
Montañeses	4–0	5–1	2–1	0–0	2–0	0–1	0–1	1–0	—	2–4	1–0	1–3	2–0
Neza	2–1	3–2	3–2	1–5	1–4	0–6	0–1	1–1	0–5	—	0–3	0–3	1–4
Pioneros de Cancún	1–2	0–2	0–2	2–3	3–1	1–0	1–1	2–0	2–1	1–0	—	1–1	4–1
Racing de Veracruz	5–0	4–0	2–0	1–0	3–0	3–2	5–0	2–0	2–0	2–1	3–1	—	2–1
Tapachula	6–0	4–1	1–0	2–3	4–0	3–1	2–3	1–2	3–1	1–0	2–1	0–1	—

Updated to match(es) played on 11 April 2026. Source: Liga Premier FMF
Legend: Blue = home team win; Yellow = draw; Red = away team win.

=== Regular season statistics ===
==== Top goalscorers ====
Players sorted first by goals scored, then by last name.

Rank	Player	Club	Goals
1	(Mexico) Francisco Castañeda	Deportiva Venados	27
2	(Mexico) Kevin Loera	Los Cabos United / Tigres de Álica	25
3	(Mexico) Isaac Aguilar	Sporting Canamy	21
4	(Mexico) Alán Vázquez	Tapachula	14
4	(Mexico) Isaac Velasco	Guerreros de Autlán	14

Source:Liga Premier FMF

==== Hat-tricks ====
Player	For	Against	Result	Date	Round
(Mexico) Francisco Castañeda	Deportiva Venados	Chapulineros de Oaxaca	5 – 1 (H)	13 September 2025	4
(Mexico) Kevin Zavala	Ensenada	Tritones Vallarta	3 – 0 (H)	20 September 2025	5
(Mexico) Moisés Villatoro	Tapachula	Celaya	4 – 1 (H)	27 September 2025	6
(Mexico) Gianni Rubli	UAT	Ciervos	4 – 0 (H)	10 October 2025	8
(Mexico) Jesús Hernández	Celaya	Héroes de Zaci	4 – 0 (H)	25 October 2025	10
(Mexico) Fernando Vázquez	Pioneros de Cancún	Tapachula	4 – 1 (H)	8 November 2025	11
(Ecuador) Santiago Micolta^{4}	Deportiva Venados	Dragones Toluca	8 – 1 (H)	15 November 2025	12
(Mexico) Kevin Loera	Los Cabos United	Tritones Vallarta	4 – 1 (H)	15 November 2025	12
(Mexico) Mauricio Farjeat	Dragones Toluca	Héroes de Zaci	0 – 4 (A)	30 January 2026	17
(Mexico) Francisco Castañeda	Deportiva Venados	Héroes de Zaci	1 – 4 (A)	13 February 2026	19
(Mexico) Daniel Jiménez	Tuzos UAZ	Guerreros de Autlán	3 – 1 (H)	14 February 2026	19
(Mexico) Sebastián Martínez	Durango	Ensenada	6 – 0 (H)	20 March 2026	24
(Mexico) Antón Enciso	Cañoneros	Héroes de Zaci	5 – 0 (H)	31 March 2026	16
(Mexico) Francisco Castañeda^{5}	Deportiva Venados	Neza	7 – 1 (H)	11 April 2026	26

^{4} Player scored four goals
^{5} Player scored five goals
(H) – Home; (A) – Away

=== Attendance ===
==== Per team ====
Pos	Team	Total	High	Low	Average	Change
1	Celaya	59,812	7,771	3,537	5,626	+116.1%^{3}
2	Racing de Veracruz	34,613	4,258	30	3,461	+166.2%^{1,2}
3	Inter Playa del Carmen	37,322	6,232	1,230	3,178	+58.3%
4	Montañeses	36,737	5,467	907	3,061	+47.0%
5	Gavilanes de Matamoros	38,059	7,000	1,349	2,928	+2.4%
6	Calor	33,903	6,842	400	2,608	+3,160.0%^{7}
7	Jaguares	28,581	4,139	833	2,382	−73.2%
8	Alacranes de Durango	26,827	3,026	1,100	2,064	+169.1%
9	Tapachula Soconusco	16,884	4,380	180	1,407	−60.6%
10	Los Cabos United	7,746	2,000	250	646	+115.3%^{1}
11	Lobos ULMX	8,262	1,804	150	636	+109.2%
12	Pioneros de Cancún	6,763	900	350	615	−10.9%
13	La Piedad	7,439	1,233	150	572	−47.7%
14	Guerreros de Autlán	6,193	924	325	563	n/a^{1,2,5}
15	Neza	5,960	1,500	105	542	+347.9%^{12}
16	Halcones	5,718	684	247	440	+212.1%^{9}
17	Tigres de Álica	5,616	1,500	50	432	+155.6%
18	Deportiva Venados	4,987	833	204	416	−58.4%
19	Cimarrones de Sonora	4,562	518	291	415	+95.8%^{1}
20	Chilpancingo	4,391	1,000	124	338	−43.7%^{2}
21	ACF Zapotlanejo	3,992	700	50	307	+41.5%
22	Cordobés	3,986	700	42	307	+252.9%^{2,4}
23	Héroes de Zaci	3,333	873	50	303	n/a^{1,2,5}
24	Chapulineros de Oaxaca	3,530	947	52	294	n/a^{6}
25	Zitácuaro	3,617	850	100	278	−55.8%
26	Dragones Toluca	2,966	800	50	270	+440.0%^{11}
27	Tecos	3,350	620	60	258	+87.0%
28	Zacatepec	2,938	376	140	226	−4.2%
29	UAT	2,754	650	50	212	+100.0%
30	Real Apodaca	2,754	621	50	212	+25.4%
31	Santiago	2,622	350	65	202	+165.8%^{4}
32	Cañoneros	2,370	487	50	198	+110.6%^{4}
33	Tritones Vallarta	2,555	300	95	197	+48.1%
34	Tuzos UAZ	1,875	300	30	144	−1.4%
35	Ensenada	1,842	350	50	142	−53.7%^{8}
36	Ciervos	1,783	200	50	137	+3.0%^{4}
37	Atlético Hidalgo	1,462	220	51	112	+7.7%^{4,9}
38	Colima	1,298	200	34	100	−17.4%
39	Leones Negros	1,140	180	37	88	+2.3%
40	Sporting Canamy	1,091	180	50	84	+25.4%
41	Mineros de Fresnillo	966	156	35	74	−26.0%^{2}
	League total	440,339	7,771	30	862	−21.6%

Source: Liga Premier FMF
Notes:
Only regular season listed:
1: The team played at least one match behind closed doors
2: The team played at least one match on an alternative field.
3: Celaya played Liga de Expansión MX last season.
4: Team played Liga Premier – Serie B last season.
5: Team played Liga TDP last season.
6: Team did not play last season.
7: Calor played Liga Premier – Serie B last season at San Juan de los Lagos.
8: Ensenada played last season as Agricultores F.C.
9: Halcones played last season at Querétaro City.
10: Atlético Hidalgo played last season as Atlético Pachuca
11: Dragones Toluca played last season as Mexicali.
12: Neza played last season as Atlético Aragón.

==== Highest and lowest ====
Highest attended					Lowest attended			
Week	Home	Score	Away	Attendance	Home	Score	Away	Attendance
1	Celaya	3–1	Pioneros de Cancún	7,771	Sporting Canamy	1–2	Chilpancingo	140
2	Jaguares	0–1	Inter Playa del Carmen	3,800	Atlético Hidalgo	1–3	Zitácuaro	80
3	Celaya	3–2	Dragones Toluca	6,467	Sporting Canamy	1–1	Lobos ULMX	70
4	Lobos ULMX	0–1	Zacatepec	1,800	Córdoba	3–0	Ciervos	42
5	Celaya	1–2	Deportiva Venados	7,062	Mineros de Fresnillo	2–1	Guerreros de Autlán	35
6	Calor	0–0	UAT	6,842	Atlético Hidalgo	3–4	Sporting Canamy	78
7	Celaya	0–1	Racing de Veracruz	7,059	Ciervos	1–2	Calor	50
8	Racing de Veracruz	3–2	Héroes de Zaci	2,967	UAT	4–0	Ciervos	50
9	Montañeses	2–0	Tapachula	2,614	Mineros de Fresnillo	1–0	Los Cabos United	46
10	Celaya	4–0	Héroes de Zaci	4,662	Leones Negros	2–1	Mineros de Fresnillo	54
11	Jaguares	1–1	Racing de Veracruz	4,139	Mineros de Fresnillo	3–0	Colima	45
12	Celaya	1–0	Montañeses	4,551	ACF Zapotlanejo	0–3	Ensenada	50
13	Jaguares	0–1	Celaya	3,632	Ensenada	0–0	UAZ	50
14	Jaguares	1–0	Héroes de Zaci	2,250	Real Apodaca	2–0	Ciervos	50
15	Gavilanes de Matamoros	1–1	Santiago	4,810	Leones Negros	2–0	Los Cabos United	45
16	Alacranes de Durango	2–0	Tritones Vallarta	1,916	Leones Negros	0–1	UAZ	37
17	Celaya	6–0	Neza	5,079	Héroes de Zaci	0–4	Dragones Toluca	50
18	Calor	2–0	Gavilanes de Matamoros	2,033	Leones Negros	3–1	La Piedad	62
19	Celaya	2–2	Tapachula	4,374	Mineros de Fresnillo	3–2	Tecos	63
20	Racing de Veracruz	4–0	Celaya	6,124	Colima	1–4	Alacranes de Durango	50
21	Celaya	1–0	Chapulineros de Oaxaca	7,696	Real Apodaca	3–0	Halcones	50
22	Calor	0–0	Zacatepec	2,300	Colima	4–1	Ensenada	50
23	Montañeses	1–3	Racing de Veracruz	5,467	Sporting Canamy	1–1	Ciervos	50
24	Celaya	0–0	Inter Playa del Carmen	4,613	Colima	0–0	Mineros de Fresnillo	34
25	Montañeses	5–1	Celaya	3,612	Mineros de Fresnillo	6–2	La Piedad	64
26	Calor	4–1	Lobos ULMX	4,550	Racing de Veracruz	5–0	Cañoneros	30

Source: Liga Premier FMF

1. Does not include matches played behind closed doors.

== Liguilla ==
=== Liguilla de Ascenso ===
The winners of each group will qualify for the quarter–finals, while the teams ranked between second and fourth place, and the best fifth place of the three groups, will play the reclassification. The higher seeded teams play on their home field during the second leg. The winner of each match up is determined by aggregate score. In the reclassification, quarter–finals and semifinals, if the two teams are tied on aggregate the higher seeded team advances. In the season final, if the two teams are tied after both legs, the match goes to extra time and, if necessary, a penalty shoot-out. To establish the order of the seeded teams, the coefficient table will be used.

==== Reclassification ====
The first legs were played on 15 April, and the second legs were played on 18 April 2026.

Team 1	Agg.	Team 2	1st leg	2nd leg
Deportiva Venados	3–1	Calor	1–0	2–1
Tigres de Álica	2–3	Halcones	0–2	2–1
Santiago	3–4	Zacatepec	1–1	2–3
Tecos	0–2	Inter Playa del Carmen	0–2	0–0
Tapachula	1–2	Tritones Vallarta	0–1	1–1

Matches

15 April 2026
19:30 CDT (UTC−5)

Calor	0–1	Deportiva Venados
	Report	Flores 36'

Unidad Deportiva Solidaridad, Reynosa
Attendance: 4,485
Referee: Irvin Aldair Acosta
18 April 2026
15:30 CST (UTC−6)

Deportiva Venados	2–1	Calor
Castañeda 60'; García 68'	Report	Lozano 87'

Estadio Alonso Diego Molina, Tamanché
Attendance: 521
Referee: Maximiliano Arias Guzmán

Deportiva Venados won 3–1 on aggregate.

15 April 2026
15:30 CST (UTC−6)

Halcones	2–0	Tigres de Álica
Valencia 53'; Salas 59'	Report

Unidad Deportiva Hermanos López Rayón, Uruapan
Attendance: 532
Referee: Axelle Daniel Hernández
18 April 2026
19:30 MST (UTC−7)

Tigres de Álica	2–1	Halcones
Arana 61'; Montes 85'	Report	Valencia 30'

Estadio Nicolás Álvarez Ortega, Tepic
Attendance: 480
Referee: Ángel Emmanuel Alzaga

Halcones won 2–3 on aggregate.

15 April 2026
15:30 CST (UTC−6)

Zacatepec	1–1	Santiago
Huerta 68'	Report	P. Sánchez 86'

Estadio Mariano Matamoros, Xochitepec
Attendance: 648
Referee: Luis Ángel Cabrera
18 April 2026
18:00 CST (UTC−6)

Santiago	2–3	Zacatepec
Chairez 63'; Cruz 90+6'	Report	González 32'; Preciado 83'; Mena 90+2'

La Capilla Soccer Park, Allende
Attendance: 350
Referee: Omar Alejandro Ortega

Zacatepec won 3–4 on aggregate.

15 April 2026
17:00 EST (UTC−5)

Inter Playa del Carmen	2–0	Tecos
Guzmán 18'; De Oliveira 48'	Report

Estadio Mario Villanueva Madrid, Playa del Carmen
Attendance: 1,593
Referee: Adrián Jhonatan del Ángel
18 April 2026
16:00 CST (UTC−6)

Tecos	0–0	Inter Playa del Carmen
	Report

Cancha Alterna Tres de Marzo, Zapopan
Attendance: 120
Referee: Mario Velázquez Román

Inter Playa del Carmen won 0–2 on aggregate.

15 April 2026
16:00 CST (UTC−6)

Tritones Vallarta	1–0	Tapachula
Suárez 43'	Report

Centro Deportivo Curiel, Puerto Vallarta
Attendance: 300
Referee: Oscar Yair Toledo
18 April 2026
19:00 CST (UTC−6)

Tapachula	1–1	Tritones Vallarta
Vázquez 42'	Report	Quintero 7'

Estadio Olímpico de Tapachula, Tapachula
Attendance: 4,860
Referee: Brian Jair Jiménez

Tritones Vallarta won 1–2 on aggregate.

==== Bracket ====
Quarter-finals
2	Alacranes de Durango (s)	2	1	3
11	Zacatepec	2	1	3
1	Racing de Veracruz	0	0	0
12	Halcones	0	2	2
3	Real Apodaca	0	3	3
10	Inter Playa del Carmen	0	1	1
4	Deportiva Venados	1	1	2
9	Tritones Vallarta	1	0	1

Semi-finals
2	Alacranes de Durango	0	2	2
12	Halcones	0	1	1
3	Real Apodaca	1	2	3
4	Deportiva Venados	1	4	5

Final
2	Alacranes de Durango	1	0	1
4	Deportiva Venados	2	0	2

===== Quarter–finals =====
The first legs were played on 22 and 23 April, and the second legs were played on 25 and 26 April 2026.

Team 1	Agg.	Team 2	1st leg	2nd leg
Racing de Veracruz	0–2	Halcones	0–0	0–2
Alacranes de Durango (s)	3–3	Zacatepec	2–2	1–1
Real Apodaca	3–1	Inter Playa del Carmen	0–0	3–1
Deportiva Venados	2–1	Tritones Vallarta	1–1	1–0

Matches

22 April 2026
15:30 CST (UTC−6)

Halcones	0–0	Racing de Veracruz
	Report

Unidad Deportiva Hermanos López Rayón, Uruapan
Attendance: 832
Referee: Luis Ángel Cabrera
25 April 2026
10:00 CST (UTC−6)

Racing de Veracruz	0–2	Halcones
	Report	Aguilera 21'; Arce 83'

Estadio de la FMF, Toluca
Attendance: 431
Referee: Maximiliano Arias Guzmán

Halcones won 0–2 on aggregate.

22 April 2026
15:30 CST (UTC−6)

Zacatepec	2–2	Alacranes de Durango
Chávez 55', 76'	Report	Jared Torres 41'; Oteo 44'

Estadio Mariano Matamoros, Xochitepec
Attendance: 856
Referee: Ángel Emmanuel Alzaga
25 April 2026
19:00 CST (UTC−6)

Alacranes de Durango	1–1	Zacatepec
O. Muñoz 90+5'	Report	Ramírez 9'

Estadio Francisco Zarco, Durango
Attendance: 4,135
Referee: Mario Velázquez Román

3–3 on aggregate. Durango advanced due to being the higher seeded team.

23 April 2026
17:00 EST (UTC−5)

Inter Playa del Carmen	0–0	Real Apodaca
	Report

Estadio Mario Villanueva Madrid, Playa del Carmen
Attendance: 3,527
Referee: Axelle Daniel Hernández
26 April 2026
16:00 CST (UTC−6)

Real Apodaca	3–1	Inter Playa del Carmen
Cruz 5'; Andrey 24', 90+3'	Report	Jaramillo 83' (own)

Unidad Deportiva Centenario del Ejército Mexicano, Apodaca
Attendance: 300
Referee: Omar Alejandro Ortega

Real Apodaca won 3–1 on aggregate.

22 April 2026
16:00 CST (UTC−6)

Tritones Vallarta	1–1	Deportiva Venados
Zamora 90+6'	Report	Jaramillo 90+3'

Centro Deportivo Curiel, Puerto Vallarta
Attendance: 330
Referee: Rodrigo Ramos Romo
25 April 2026
16:00 CST (UTC−6)

Deportiva Venados	1–0	Tritones Vallarta
Micolta 7'	Report

Estadio Alonso Diego Molina, Tamanché
Attendance: 589
Referee: Adrián Jhonatan del Ángel

Deportiva Venados won 2–1 on aggregate.

===== Semi–finals =====
The first legs were played on 29 and 30 April, and the second legs were played on 2 and 3 May 2026.

Team 1	Agg.	Team 2	1st leg	2nd leg
Alacranes de Durango	2–1	Halcones	0–0	2–1
Real Apodaca	3–5	Deportiva Venados	1–1	2–4

Matches

29 April 2026
15:30 CST (UTC−6)

Halcones	0–0	Alacranes de Durango
	Report

Unidad Deportiva Hermanos López Rayón, Uruapan
Attendance: 1,632
Referee: Rodrigo Ramos Romo
2 May 2026
20:00 CST (UTC−6)

Alacranes de Durango	2–1	Halcones
Pizano 2' (own); Domínguez 90+5'	Report	Frausto 87'

Estadio Francisco Zarco, Durango
Attendance: 8,130
Referee: Omar Alejandro Ortega

Durango won 2–1 on aggregate.

30 April 2026
16:00 CST (UTC−6)

Deportiva Venados	1–1	Real Apodaca
Rodríguez 5'	Report	Andrey 59'

Estadio Alonso Diego Molina, Tamanché
Attendance: 850
Referee: Ángel Emmanuel Alzaga
3 May 2026
16:00 CST (UTC−6)

Real Apodaca	2–4	Deportiva Venados
Ramírez 6'; Montelongo 52'	Report	Lugo 1'; García 3'; Castañeda 9', 37'

Unidad Deportiva Centenario del Ejército Mexicano, Apodaca
Attendance: 300
Referee: Maximiliano Arias Guzmán

Deportiva Venados won 2–4 on aggregate.

===== Final =====
The first leg will be played on 6 May, and the second leg was played on 9 May 2026.

Team 1	Agg.	Team 2	1st leg	2nd leg
Alacranes de Durango	1–2	Deportiva Venados	1–2	0–0

First leg

6 May 2026
16:00 CST (UTC−6)

Deportiva Venados	2–1	Alacranes de Durango
Díaz 24'; Castañeda 45'	Report	Aquino 1'

Estadio Alonso Diego Molina, Tamanché
Attendance: 2,500
Referee: Omar Alejandro Ortega

Deportiva Venados	Alacranes de Durango

13	GK	(Mexico) Lothar López
12	DF	(Mexico) Omar Reynoso
16	DF	(Mexico) Pedro Hermida
30	DF	(Mexico) Erick Hernández	(yellow card) 84'
32	DF	(Mexico) José Juan Rodríguez
5	MF	(Mexico) Néstor Díaz
10	MF	(Mexico) César Landa		(substituted off) 69'
18	MF	(Mexico) José Lugo		(substituted off) 69'
20	MF	(Mexico) Cristian García		(substituted off) 45'
11	FW	(Mexico) Francisco Castañeda		(substituted off) 61'
19	FW	(Ecuador) Santiago Micolta
Substitutions:
24	GK	(Mexico) Axel Quiroz
17	DF	(Mexico) César Aguirre
27	DF	(Mexico) Edson Sánchez
15	MF	(Mexico) Brayan Beltrán		(substituted on) 45'
21	MF	(Mexico) Renato Jaramillo		(substituted on) 69'
22	MF	(Mexico) Miguel González
25	MF	(Mexico) José Flores		(substituted on) 69'
26	MF	(Mexico) Kevin Sandoval
9	FW	(Colombia) Klinsman Calderón		(substituted on) 61'
14	FW	(Mexico) Obeth Guzmán
Manager:
(Mexico) Alfredo García Salmones

1	GK	(Mexico) Jared Muñoz
2	DF	(Mexico) Jesús González	(yellow card) 45'
4	DF	(Mexico) Osmar Múñoz
5	DF	(Mexico) Ernesto Aquino		(substituted off) 81'
12	DF	(Mexico) Miguel Lozano	(yellow card) 40'	(substituted off) 45'
21	DF	(Mexico) David Oteo
8	MF	(Mexico) Tomás Montano	(yellow card) 35'	(substituted off) 45'
14	MF	(Mexico) Brayan Muñoz	(yellow card) 68'	(substituted off) 69'
15	MF	(Mexico) Aldieri Valenzuela		(substituted off) 45'
28	MF	(Mexico) Jared Torres
17	FW	(Mexico) Ismael Reyes		(substituted off) 77'
Substitutions:
24	GK	(Mexico) Erick de Loa
13	DF	(Mexico) Jan Ontiveros		(substituted on) 45'
23	DF	(Mexico) Iñaki Castillo
6	MF	(Mexico) Emiliano Martínez		(substituted on) 69'
10	MF	(Mexico) Diego Piñón		(substituted on) 81'
11	MF	(Mexico) Reynaldo Cantú		(substituted on) 45'
18	MF	(Mexico) Jesús Torres
19	FW	(Mexico) Brian Domínguez		(substituted on) 77'
20	FW	(Colombia) Sergio Cardona
22	FW	(Mexico) Daniel Vázquez		(substituted on) 45'
Manager:
(Mexico) Héctor Jair Real

Second leg

9 May 2026
20:00 CST (UTC−6)

Alacranes de Durango	0–0	Deportiva Venados
	Report

Estadio Francisco Zarco, Durango
Attendance: 10,500
Referee: Maximiliano Arias Guzmán

Alacranes de Durango	Deportiva Venados

1	GK	(Mexico) Jared Muñoz
2	DF	(Mexico) Jesús González
4	DF	(Mexico) Osmar Múñoz
5	DF	(Mexico) Ernesto Aquino		(substituted off) 60'
21	DF	(Mexico) David Oteo		(substituted off) 69'
8	MF	(Mexico) Tomás Montano		(substituted off) 69'
10	MF	(Mexico) Diego Piñón		(substituted off) 54'
14	MF	(Mexico) Brayan Muñoz
15	MF	(Mexico) Aldieri Valenzuela		(substituted off) 45'
28	MF	(Mexico) Jared Torres	(yellow card) 28'
17	FW	(Mexico) Ismael Reyes
Substitutions:
24	GK	(Mexico) Erick de Loa
12	DF	(Mexico) Miguel Lozano		(substituted on) 54'
13	DF	(Mexico) Jan Ontiveros		(substituted on) 60'
23	DF	(Mexico) Iñaki Castillo
6	MF	(Mexico) Emiliano Martínez
11	MF	(Mexico) Reynaldo Cantú		(substituted on) 69'
18	MF	(Mexico) Jesús Torres
7	FW	(Mexico) Sebastián Martínez
19	FW	(Mexico) Brian Domínguez		(substituted on) 45'
22	FW	(Mexico) Daniel Vázquez		(substituted on) 69'
Manager:
(Mexico) Héctor Jair Real

13	GK	(Mexico) Lothar López
12	DF	(Mexico) Omar Reynoso
16	DF	(Mexico) Pedro Hermida
30	DF	(Mexico) Erick Hernández	(yellow card) 53'
32	DF	(Mexico) José Juan Rodríguez
5	MF	(Mexico) Néstor Díaz	(yellow card) 90'
10	MF	(Mexico) César Landa	(yellow card) 36'	(substituted off) 66'
18	MF	(Mexico) José Lugo		(substituted off) 74'
21	MF	(Mexico) Renato Jaramillo		(substituted off) 74'
11	FW	(Mexico) Francisco Castañeda		(substituted off) 66'
19	FW	(Ecuador) Santiago Micolta
Substitutions:
24	GK	(Mexico) Axel Quiroz
17	DF	(Mexico) César Aguirre
27	DF	(Mexico) Edson Sánchez
15	MF	(Mexico) Brayan Beltrán	(yellow card) 83'	(substituted on) 66'
22	MF	(Mexico) Miguel González		(substituted on) 74'
25	MF	(Mexico) José Flores		(substituted on) 66'
26	MF	(Mexico) Kevin Sandoval
9	FW	(Colombia) Klinsman Calderón		(substituted on) 74'
14	FW	(Mexico) Obeth Guzmán
Manager:
(Mexico) Alfredo García Salmones

Deportiva Venados won 1–2 on aggregate.

=== Liguilla de Filiales ===
The four best reserve teams of the season play two games against each other on a home-and-away basis. The higher seeded teams play on their home field during the second leg. The winner of each match up is determined by aggregate score. In the semifinals, if the two teams are tied on aggregate the higher seeded team advances. In the final, if the two teams are tied after both legs, the match goes to extra time and, if necessary, a penalty shoot-out.

Semi–finals
1	Cimarrones de Sonora (s)	1	1	2
4	Mineros de Fresnillo	1	1	2
2	Leones Negros	0	1	1
3	Celaya	5	2	7

Final
1	Cimarrones de Sonora	1	2	3 (5)
3	Celaya (p)	2	1	3 (6)

==== Semi–finals ====
The first legs were played on 15 April, and the second legs were played on 18 April 2026.

Team 1	Agg.	Team 2	1st leg	2nd leg
Cimarrones de Sonora (s)	2–2	Mineros de Fresnillo	1–1	1–1
Leones Negros	1–7	Celaya	0–5	1–2

Matches

15 April 2026
12:00 CST (UTC−6)

Mineros de Fresnillo	1–1	Cimarrones de Sonora
Ibarra 22'	Report	Serna 58'

Estadio Carlos Vega Villalba, Zacatecas
Attendance: 146
Referee: Andrés Benjamín Hernández
18 April 2026
19:00 MST (UTC−7)

Cimarrones de Sonora	1–1	Mineros de Fresnillo
E. Pérez 64'	Report	Cordero 85'

Estadio Héroe de Nacozari, Hermosillo
Attendance: 851
Referee: Alejandro Torres Favela

2–2 on aggregate. Cimarrones de Sonora advanced due to be the higher seeded team.

15 April 2026
19:00 CST (UTC−6)

Celaya	5–0	Leones Negros
Jiménez 4'; Varela 33'; Recalde 44'; Medellín 58'; K. Hernández 77'	Report

Estadio Miguel Alemán Valdés, Celaya
Attendance: 4,809
Referee: Guillermo Estrada Rea
18 April 2026
11:00 CST (UTC−6)

Leones Negros	1–2	Celaya
Salcido 65'	Report	Salazar 40'; Recalde 47'

Club Deportivo La Primavera, Zapopan
Attendance: 98
Referee: Rodrigo Ramos Romo

Celaya won 1–7 on aggregate.

==== Final ====
The first leg was played on 22 April, and the second leg was played on 25 April 2026.

Team 1	Agg.	Team 2	1st leg	2nd leg
Cimarrones de Sonora	3–3 (5–6)	Celaya	1–2	2–1

Matches

22 April 2026
20:00 CST (UTC−6)

Celaya	2–1	Cimarrones de Sonora
Salazar 19'; Adorno 90+4'	Report	E. Pérez 27'

Estadio Miguel Alemán Valdés, Celaya
Attendance: 12,829
Referee: Alejandro Torres Favela
25 April 2026
19:00 MST (UTC−7)

Cimarrones de Sonora	2–1	Celaya
Fernández 48'; Navarro 52'	Report	K. Hernández 52'
Penalties
	5–6

Estadio Héroe de Nacozari, Hermosillo
Attendance: 1,322
Referee: Guillermo Estrada Rea

3–3 on aggregate. Celaya won 5–6 on the penalty shoot–out.

== Coefficient table ==
P	Team	Pts	G	Pts/G	GD
1	Racing de Veracruz	71	24	2.958	+46
2	Alacranes de Durango	74	26	2.846	+55
3	Real Apodaca	66	26	2.538	+28
4	Deportiva Venados	52	24	2.167	+36
5	Tigres de Álica	56	26	2.154	+21
6	Cimarrones de Sonora	54	26	2.077	+27
7	Leones Negros	53	26	2.038	+16
8	Santiago	51	26	1.962	+22
9	Tecos	49	26	1.885	+15
10	Tapachula	44	24	1.833	+16
11	Celaya	43	24	1.792	+10
12	Tritones Vallarta	46	26	1.769	+5
13	Inter Playa del Carmen	42	24	1.750	+7
14	Zacatepec	45	26	1.731	+14
15	Halcones	44	26	1.692	+17
16	Calor	44	26	1.692	+11
17	Gavilanes de Matamoros	44	26	1.692	+9
18	Montañeses	38	24	1.583	+7
19	Lobos ULMX	40	26	1.538	+7
20	Mineros de Fresnillo	39	26	1.500	–1
21	Pioneros de Cancún	35	24	1.458	0
22	Los Cabos United	37	26	1.423	–3
23	Jaguares	34	24	1.417	+1
24	Héroes de Zaci	34	24	1.417	–13
25	UAT	36	26	1.385	+2
26	Chilpancingo	35	26	1.346	–8
27	Guerreros de Autlán	32	26	1.231	–5
28	Cordobés	30	26	1.154	–1
29	Tuzos UAZ	29	26	1.115	–16
30	Zitácuaro	28	26	1.077	–9
31	Ensenada	28	26	1.077	–25
32	Sporting Canamy	26	26	1.000	–20
33	Chapulineros de Oaxaca	23	24	0.958	–12
34	Cañoneros	22	24	0.917	–24
35	La Piedad	23	26	0.885	–27
36	ACF Zapotlanejo	21	26	0.808	–34
37	Neza	19	24	0.792	–45
38	Dragones Toluca	17	24	0.708	–26
39	Ciervos	18	26	0.692	–29
40	Colima	17	26	0.654	–28
41	Atlético Hidalgo	16	26	0.615	–40

Last updated: April 11, 2026
Source: Liga Premier FMF
P = Position; G = Games played; Pts = Points; Pts/G = Ratio of points to games played; GD = Goal difference

== See also ==
- 2025–26 Liga MX season
- 2025–26 Liga de Expansión MX season
- 2025–26 Serie B de México season
- 2025–26 Liga TDP season
- 2026 Copa Conecta
