= Jorge Mora =

Mexican footballer (born 1991)

Personal information
- Full name: Jorge Armando Mora Guzmán
- Date of birth: 16 January 1991 (age 35)
- Place of birth: Guadalajara, Jalisco, Mexico
- Height: 1.77 m (5 ft 10 in)
- Position: Attacking midfielder

Team information
- Current team: Zapotlanejo (Manager)

Senior career*
Years	Team	Apps	(Gls)
2011–2017	Guadalajara	9	(1)
2012	→ Correcaminos (loan)	5	(0)
2013	→ Cruz Azul Hidalgo (loan)	9	(1)
2013–2014	→ Los Altos (loan)	26	(17)
2014–2015	→ Coras (loan)	16	(4)
2015–2017	→ Leones Negros (loan)	55	(18)
2017–2020	Leones Negros	40	(10)
2020-2021	Salamanca	12	(1)
2021–2022	Tepatitlán	16	(1)
2022	Durango	13	(0)
2023	Oaxaca	19	(1)

Managerial career
- 2026–: Zapotlanejo
Medal record
Representing Mexico
Winner	CONCACAF U-20 Championship	2011
- * Club domestic league appearances and goals as of 24 June 2022

Jorge Armando Mora Guzmán (Note: In this Mexican name, the surname is Mora and the second or maternal family name is Guzmán.) (born 16 January 1991) is a former Mexican professional footballer who last played as a midfielder for Alebrijes de Oaxaca. He is the son of former player Octavio Mora as well as the nephew of manager and former player Daniel Guzmán.

== Club career ==
=== Guadalajara ===
Mora was added to the Club Deportivo Guadalajara first team roster when they played in the 2010 Copa Libertadores. He co-captained the Chivas sub-20 team. On 19 February he scored his first goal and now holds the record for the fastest goal for a debut.

== International career ==
=== Mexico U20 ===
In the Torneo de Las Americas tournament, Mora was one of the captains on the Mexico U-20 team.

== Honours ==
Mexico U20

- CONCACAF U-20 Championship: 2011
