= Ensenada F.C. =

Ensenada FC
- Full name: Ensenada Fútbol Club
- Founded: June 27, 2025
- Dissolved: April 11, 2026
- Ground: Estadio Unidad Deportiva Raúl Ramírez Lozano; Ensenada, Baja California
- Capacity: 7,600
- Owner: Felipe Ignacio Lameiro Meza
- Chairman: Cristián Iván Rivera Ramírez
- Manager: José de Jesús Monzón
- League: Liga Premier (Serie A)
- 2025–26: Regular phase: 11th (Group I); Final phase: Did not qualify
Home colours	Away colours

Ensenada Fútbol Club, also known as "Los Tiburones de Ensenada", was a Mexican professional football club based in the city and port of Ensenada, Baja California, Mexico, that competed in the Liga Premier, the third tier of Mexican football.

== History ==
In January 2025, Agricultores F.C. Guasave, a team that played in the Liga Premier – Serie A, was relocated from Guasave, Sinaloa to Ensenada, Baja California due to security problems in Sinaloa that were causing many complications for the team's operation in its hometown.

In June 2025, the dissolution of Agricultores F.C. and its refoundation as Ensenada F.C. was formalized. The owners felt it was impossible to return to their hometown, so they decided to found a new team to adapt to their new city.

After its founding, Ensenada F.C. continued to participate in the Liga Premier – Serie A, being placed in Group 1, the same group occupied by Agricultores F.C., a team from which Ensenada F.C. inherited all participation rights.

== Stadium ==
The Estadio Municipal de Ensenada, officially named Estadio de la Unidad Deportiva Raúl Ramírez Lozano, is a multi-use stadium in Ensenada, Baja California, Mexico. It is used mostly for football matches and is the home stadium for Ensenada F.C.

== Players ==
=== First-team squad ===
As of 18 January 2026

Note: Flags indicate national team as defined under FIFA eligibility rules; some limited exceptions apply. Players may hold more than one non-FIFA nationality.

No.	Pos.	Nation	Player
1	GK	MEX	Alfredo Rodríguez
2	DF	MEX	Juan Pablo Ríos
3	DF	COL	Sebastián Mosquera
4	DF	MEX	Leonardo Parra
5	MF	MEX	Luis Long
6	DF	MEX	Fernando Martínez
7	FW	MEX	Yefte Espinoza
8	MF	MEX	Armando Serrano
9	FW	USA	Jovany López
10	FW	MEX	Andrés Pérez
11	FW	MEX	Alonso Robles
12	GK	MEX	Diego Gaitán
13	DF	MEX	Waldo Jiménez
14	MF	MEX	Rey Flores
15	MF	MEX	Armando Sánchez

No.	Pos.	Nation	Player
16	DF	MEX	Gael Parra
17	DF	MEX	José Gutiérrez
18	MF	MEX	Johan Rodríguez
19	FW	MEX	Fabián López
20	MF	MEX	Manuel Carrillo
21	GK	MEX	Andrés Soria
22	MF	MEX	Juan Luis Balaguer
23	MF	MEX	Joel Villanazul
24	DF	MEX	Alfredo Hernández
25	DF	MEX	Sebastián Loera
26	FW	MEX	Elioth Mata
27	MF	MEX	Iván Espinoza
29	DF	MEX	Carlos Ayón
37	FW	MEX	Ángel Magaña

=== Reserve teams ===
Atlético Acaponeta
Reserve team that plays in the Liga TDP, the fourth level of the Mexican league system.
