= Atlético Ensenada =

Mexican association football club

- Full name: Atlético Ensenada Fútbol Club
- Founded: 23 March 2020; 6 years ago
- Ground: Estadio Municipal de Ensenada; Ensenada, Baja California
- Capacity: 7,600
- Chairman: Antonio García
- Manager: Carlos Torres Garcés
- League: Liga de Balompié Mexicano
Home colours	Away colours	Third colours

Atlético Ensenada Fútbol Club is a Mexican professional football club based in Ensenada, Baja California currently put in hiatus, that would have played in the Liga de Balompié Mexicano.

== History ==
On October 30, 2019, the creation of a football team in the city of Ensenada, Baja California was announced and became official, which would have originally played in the Primera División de México starting from 2020, however, the team was rejected from the league, and it was reported that the club would instead participate in a different league other than the Liga MX.

On March 23, 2020, the franchise was officially announced, also being the first confirmed club to participate the Liga de Balompié Mexicano. A month later, Ramón Ramírez was appointed as sports director of the club. On May 4, Carlos Torres Garcés was confirmed as manager of the club.

On September 29, 2020, the club was eliminated from the LBM because the league simply considered that it did not comply with the guarantees to participate in the competition, and the club has been put in hiatus indefinitely ever since.

== Stadium ==
Atlético Ensenada would have played their matches their home matches at the Estadio Municipal de Ensenada, which currently has a capacity for 7,600 spectators. On June 23, 2020, a project was announced to expand the capacity of this venue and reach 20,190 spectators, the construction would be carried out in three stages.

== Personnel ==
=== Management ===
Position	Name
President	(Mexico) Antonio García
Sports Director	(Mexico) Ramón Ramírez
