= ACF Zapotlanejo =

- Full name: Acatlán Club de Fútbol Zapotlanejo
- Founded: 31 July 2025; 13 months ago
- Ground: Estadio Municipal Miguel Hidalgo; Zapotlanejo, Jalisco
- Capacity: 1,800
- Owner: Ernesto de la Torre
- Chairman: Diego Jiménez
- Manager: Jorge Mora
- League: Liga Premier (Premier A)
- 2025–26: Liga Premier (Serie A); Regular phase: 13th (Group I); Final phase: Did not qualify
Home colours	Away colours

ACF Zapotlanejo is a professional Mexican football club that plays in the Premier A, the intermediate branch of the Liga Premier de México, the third tier of Mexican football. It is based in Zapotlanejo, Jalisco.

== History ==
In 2021, Acatlán, then a member team of the Liga TDP, was moved to Zapotlanejo because the city had better infrastructure conditions than its hometown of Acatlán, Jalisco. In 2024, the team was promoted to the Liga Premier – Serie A, the third division level of Mexican football.

In the 2024–25 season, Acatlán F.C. left Zapotlanejo due to the local stadium being damaged by a severe rainstorm, attempting to establish alternative projects in Tepatitlán and then Arandas, although none of them achieved their objective.

Following the failure of the projects in Arandas and Tepatitlán, it was announced on June 27, 2025, that the team would return to Zapotlanejo starting with the 2025–26 season. However, in order to seek greater identification with the town, on July 31, 2025 it was decided to dissolve Acatlán F.C. and use the club's license to found a new club called ACF Zapotlanejo.

== Players ==
=== First team squad ===
As of 28 August 2026

Note: Flags indicate national team as defined under FIFA eligibility rules; some limited exceptions apply. Players may hold more than one non-FIFA nationality.

No.	Pos.	Nation	Player
1	GK	MEX	Alonso Gutiérrez
3	DF	MEX	Alan Cuevas
4	DF	MEX	Luis de la Mora
5	DF	MEX	Francisco Hernández
6	MF	MEX	Emiliano Valencia
7	MF	COL	Juan Sebastián Moreno
8	MF	MEX	Kevin Bautista
9	FW	MEX	Juan Diego Arias
10	FW	MEX	Santiago Colin
11	MF	MEX	Leandro Corona
12	GK	MEX	Alejandro Flores
13	MF	MEX	Luis Alberto García
15	MF	MEX	Jesús Chacón

No.	Pos.	Nation	Player
16	FW	MEX	Carlos Terán
17	DF	MEX	Raúl Pérez
18	MF	MEX	Alexis Ponce
19	FW	MEX	Dayton Chávez
20	FW	CHI	Francisco Valdés
21	MF	MEX	Gael López
23	FW	MEX	Vicente Calderón
24	MF	MEX	Edson Balpuesta
26	MF	USA	Ernesto Chávez
28	DF	MEX	Diego Guareño
30	MF	MEX	Édgar Vallejo
33	MF	MEX	Juan Montiel

== Reserves ==
=== ACF Zapotlanejo TDP ===
Reserve team that plays in the Liga TDP, the fourth level of Mexican football.
