= Estadio Municipal de Ensenada =

Multi-use stadium in Ensenada, Baja California, Mexico

- Interactive map of Estadio Municipal de Ensenada
- Full name: Estadio de la Unidad Deportiva Raúl Ramírez Lozano
- Location: Ensenada, Baja California, Mexico
- Coordinates: 31°49′36″N 116°35′47″W
- Owner: Ensenada City Council
- Operator: Ensenada F.C.
- Capacity: 7,600
- Surface: Natural grass

Tenants
- Diablos de Ensenada (Liga TDP) (2013–14); Deportivo Ensenada (Liga TDP) (2014–15) Cuervos de Ensenada (Liga Premier) (2016–17); Atlético Ensenada (LBM) (2020); Agricultores F.C. (Liga Premier) (2025); Ensenada F.C. (Liga Premier) (2025–)

The Estadio Municipal de Ensenada, officially named Estadio de la Unidad Deportiva Raúl Ramírez Lozano, is a multi-use stadium in Ensenada, Baja California, Mexico. It is used mostly for football matches and is the home stadium for Ensenada F.C. It was also planned to be the home venue for Atlético Ensenada. The stadium has a capacity of 7,600 people.
