= Tapachula Soconusco F.C. =

Tapachula Soconusco
- Full name: Tapachula Soconusco Fútbol Club
- Founded: 26 October 2023; 3 years ago
- Ground: Estadio Olímpico de Tapachula
- Capacity: 18,017
- Owner: Jaime Damián Tovar
- Chairman: Jaime Damián Tovar
- Manager: Diego Mazariegos
- League: Liga Premier (Primera Premier)
- 2025–26: Regular phase: 3rd of 13 (Group III); Final phase: Reclassification
Home colours	Away colours

Tapachula Soconusco Fútbol Club is a professional football club based in Tapachula, Chiapas. The club competes in Liga Premier (Primera Premier), the third level of Mexican football, and plays its home matches at Estadio Olímpico de Tapachula.

== History ==
Tapachula Soconusco FC was founded on 26 October 2023, with the objective of giving a professional football club to the city of Tapachula, after five years without a representative club, this after the relocation of Cafetaleros to Tuxtla Gutiérrez in 2019. The team's founding occurred midway through the 2023–24 season, so Tapachula Socunusco was only able to participate in amateur soccer tournaments, winning a championship known as the Liga Sureste MX in June 2024. During the fall of 2023, the team announced that it would participate in the Tercera División de México starting with the 2024–25 season, which would represent the club's debut in the professional categories of Mexican football.

In June 2024, the club obtained a franchise to participate in the Liga Premier – Serie A, the third level of Mexican football, starting with the 2024–25 season. On June 28, the team was confirmed as a participating team in that league, being placed in group 3, so Tapachula Soconusco F.C. would have a main team in the Segunda División de México and a secondary squad in the Tercera División de México.

== Stadium ==
Estadio Olímpico de Tapachula is a multi-purpose stadium in Tapachula, Chiapas, Mexico. It is currently used mostly for football matches. The stadium seats 18,017 people. In 2015 the stadium was renovated in order to house Tapachula's former Ascenso MX franchise, Cafetaleros de Tapachula. In 2017 the stadium expanded to 22,000, adding 11,000 more seats from its 2015 renovation.

== Players ==
=== First team squad ===
As of 8 October 2026

Note: Flags indicate national team as defined under FIFA eligibility rules; some limited exceptions apply. Players may hold more than one non-FIFA nationality.

No.	Pos.	Nation	Player
1	GK	MEX	Alfredo Domínguez
2	DF	MEX	Juan Llorca
3	DF	MEX	Luis Torres
4	DF	MEX	Carlos Rodríguez
5	DF	MEX	Gabriel Sánchez
6	MF	MEX	Ángel Solís
7	MF	MEX	Félix Falcón
8	DF	MEX	Fidel Hernández
9	FW	MEX	Gabriel Vidal
10	FW	MEX	Karlo Flores
11	MF	COL	Heyler Moya
12	DF	MEX	Santiago Cueto
13	DF	MEX	Adam Gómez
14	MF	USA	Isaac Pérez

No.	Pos.	Nation	Player
15	MF	MEX	Efraín Hernández
16	DF	MEX	Nery de León
17	MF	MEX	Uriel Lara
18	DF	MEX	Osvaldo Villegas
19	MF	MEX	Miguel Ángel Vaca
20	MF	HON	Jonathan Gonzales
21	DF	MEX	Jesús Navarro
22	MF	MEX	Leonardo Aquino
23	DF	MEX	Fernando Martínez
24	DF	MEX	Jared Carmona
26	MF	MEX	Francisco Macías
28	MF	USA	Boni Hernández
30	DF	MEX	Ulises Barrios
33	GK	MEX	Kefrén Avilés

== Reserves ==
=== Tapachula Soconusco TDP ===
Reserve team that plays in the Liga TDP, the fourth level of Mexican football.

== Managers ==
- (Mexico) Carlos Gómez (2024–25)
- (Mexico) Diego Mazariegos (2025–)
