= José Lugo =

Mexican footballer (born 1997)

Personal information
- Full name: José Rodrigo Lugo Martínez
- Date of birth: 19 July 1997 (age 29)
- Place of birth: Culiacán, Sinaloa, Mexico
- Position: Midfielder

Team information
- Current team: Deportiva Venados
- Number: 18

Youth career
- 2015–2018: Sinaloa

Senior career*
Years	Team	Apps	(Gls)
2018–2023	Sinaloa	59	(3)
2023–2024	Matamoros	31	(0)
2024–2025	Inter Playa del Carmen	20	(1)
2025	Los Cabos United	13	(0)
2026–	Deportiva Venados	10	(0)
- * Club domestic league appearances and goals as of 15 May 2026

José Rodrigo Lugo Martínez (born 19 July 1997) is a Mexican professional footballer who plays as a midfielder for Deportiva Venados.
