= Atlético Hidalgo =

Mexican football club

Atlético Hidalgo F.C.
- Full name: Atlético Hidalgo Fútbol Club
- Nickname: Los Toltecas (The Toltecs)
- Founded: 24 December 1996; 29 years ago (as Club Atlético de Hidalgo S.A.D.); June 2025; 1 year ago (refounded as Atlético Hidalgo Fútbol Club)
- Ground: Estadio Municipal; Atitalaquía, Hidalgo
- Capacity: 3,000
- Owner: Grupo Pachuca
- Chairman: Miguel Ángel Jiménez
- Manager: Ángel Mejía
- League: Liga Premier (Premier B)
- 2025–26: Liga Premier (Serie A); Regular phase: 14th (Group II); Final phase: Did not qualify
Home colours	Away colours

Old badge

Atlético Hidalgo Fútbol Club, nicknamed Toltecas, is a Mexican football club based in Atitalaquía, Hidalgo that competes in the Premier B, the bottom branch of the Liga Premier de México, the third level division of Mexican football.

== History ==
Club Atlético de Hidalgo S.A.D. was a football club based in Pachuca, Hidalgo. Founded on December 24, 1996, it was one of the few football teams from the state of Hidalgo. It spent numerous seasons in the Tercera División de México and is considered one of the founding clubs of the competition. In 2009, the club was involved in a match-fixing scandal and was punished with relegation. From that moment, Grupo Pachuca decided to become the majority shareholder with 80% ownership. It played its home matches at the Estadio Revolución Mexicana, with a capacity of 3,500 spectators.

Identified by its red and black colors, from which it received the nickname "rojinegros" or "diablos", it was one of the most decorated clubs in Hidalgo, reaching the final of the Torneo Invierno 1996 in the Primera División 'A' de México. In 1998, the club was sold to Deportivo Toluca, and relocated to Toluca, State of Mexico, changing its identity to Atlético Mexiquense.

They returned to the Tercera División in November 2003, but in 2015, they disappeared for the last time.

In June 2025, the team was revived after the Pachuca franchise decided to rename its reserve team, Atlético Pachuca, as Atlético Hidalgo. For its new stage, the team announced its change of field to the Estadio 10 de Diciembre, located in Ciudad Cooperativa Cruz Azul, Hidalgo. However, the team was unable to take possession of the new stadium due to internal problems in the city's organization; consequently, Atlético Hidalgo continued playing in Atitalaquía, where it had played during the Atlético Pachuca era.

== Players ==
=== First team squad ===
As of 11 September 2026

Note: Flags indicate national team as defined under FIFA eligibility rules; some limited exceptions apply. Players may hold more than one non-FIFA nationality.

No.	Pos.	Nation	Player
1	GK	MEX	Enoc Duarte
2	DF	MEX	Braulio Merales
3	DF	MEX	Johan Hernández
4	DF	MEX	Jesús Valle
5	MF	MEX	Brandon Espinoza
6	DF	MEX	Maximiliano Porras
7	DF	MEX	Eric Montiel
8	MF	MEX	Sebastián Valdes
9	MF	MEX	Juan Pazos
10	MF	MEX	Daniel Sotelo
11	FW	MEX	Marco Zamorano
12	MF	MEX	Misael Ángeles
13	MF	MEX	Cristhian Santiago
14	GK	USA	Octavio Pérez

No.	Pos.	Nation	Player
15	DF	MEX	Ángel Cortés
16	FW	MEX	Emiliano García
17	DF	MEX	José Macías
20	MF	MEX	Ian Campuzano
21	MF	MEX	Alberto Romero
22	DF	USA	Alan Marín
23	MF	MEX	Roque Álvarez
25	MF	MEX	Aldo Goroztieta
26	DF	MEX	Naim Paniagua
27	DF	MEX	Emmanuel Camarillo
31	MF	MEX	Kalev Gómez
32	GK	MEX	Dylan Rodríguez
33	MF	MEX	Iván Hernández

== Reserves ==
=== Atlético Hidalgo TDP ===
Reserve team that plays in the Liga TDP, the fourth level of Mexican football.

== Honours ==
- Primera División 'A': 0

Runner-up (1): 1996
