= Jesús González (footballer, born 1998) =

Mexican footballer

Personal information
- Full name: Jesús Eduardo González Mendivil
- Date of birth: 1 January 1998 (age 28)
- Place of birth: Cajeme, Sonora, México
- Height: 1.80 m (5 ft 11 in)
- Position: Defender

Team information
- Current team: Durango
- Number: 3

Youth career
- 2013–2019: Morelia

Senior career*
| Years | Team | Apps | (Gls) |
| 2019–2020 | Morelia | 1 | (0) |
| 2019 | → UAEM (loan) | 5 | (0) |
| 2020 | Atlético Morelia | 3 | (0) |
| 2021–2023 | Sonora | 8 | (0) |
| 2023–2024 | Racing Porto Palmeiras | 27 | (1) |
| 2024–2025 | Tepatitlán | 0 | (0) |
| 2026– | Durango | 11 | (0) |
- * Club domestic league appearances and goals as of 15 May 2026

Jesús Eduardo González Mendivil (Note: In this Spanish name, the first or paternal surname is González and the second or maternal family name is Mendivil.) (born 1 January 1998) is a Mexican footballer who plays as a defender for Liga de Expansión MX club Durango.
