= Dragones Toluca F.C. =

- Full name: Dragones Toluca Fútbol Club
- Nickname: Dragones (Dragons)
- Founded: 27 June 2025; 13 months ago
- Ground: Unidad Cultural y Deportiva Sección 17 SNTE; Zinacantepec, State of Mexico
- Capacity: 1,000
- Owner(s): Daniel Wong Seto; George Wong Chu; Darío Ramón Wong Lee
- Chairman: Ernesto Navarrete Federico
- Manager: Vacant
- League: Liga Premier (Serie A)
- 2025–26: Regular phase: 13th (Group III); Final phase: Did not qualify
Home colours	Away colours

Dragones Toluca F.C. is a Mexican football club that plays in the Liga Premier – Serie A of the Segunda División de México, the third division level of Mexican football. It is based in Zinacantepec, State of Mexico.

== History ==
In April 2025, the Mexicali F.C. board was informed that it would not be able to use the Estadio Ciudad Deportiva de Mexicali due to improvements to the athletics track attached. With no other suitable football field in the city, the team was forced to look for another city to play in for the 2025–26 season.

On June 27, 2025, the relocation of Mexicali F.C. from Mexicali, Baja California to Toluca, State of Mexico was announced and became official, adopting the name Dragones Toluca F.C. The new team adopted the nickname of the original team as part of its official name, signaling its intention to return to Mexicali whenever adequate infrastructure conditions exist in the future.

On July 8, 2026, the club suspended its Liga Premier team for restructuring, although it maintained its participation with the Liga TDP and Liga TDP U–16 teams.

== Players ==
=== First-team squad ===
As of January 14, 2026

Note: Flags indicate national team as defined under FIFA eligibility rules; some limited exceptions apply. Players may hold more than one non-FIFA nationality.

No.	Pos.	Nation	Player
1	GK	MEX	Eduardo de la Cruz
2	DF	MEX	Iker Domínguez
4	DF	MEX	Carlos Cano
5	DF	MEX	Diego Ortiz
6	DF	MEX	Noél Lagos
7	MF	MEX	Omar Ramírez
8	MF	MEX	Carlos García
9	FW	MEX	Mateo González
10	MF	MEX	Luis Alberto Rosales
11	FW	ARG	Juan Llorca
12	GK	MEX	Alan Medrano
14	MF	MEX	Carlos Mendoza
15	DF	MEX	Carlos Moreno
16	MF	MEX	Ronaldo Santibáñez
17	MF	MEX	Cuauhtémoc Montes de Oca
18	MF	MEX	Emiliano Martínez
19	MF	MEX	Mario Martín del Campo

No.	Pos.	Nation	Player
20	DF	MEX	Jorge Nakamura
21	MF	MEX	Eric García
22	MF	MEX	Manuel López
23	FW	PAR	Alexis Benítez
24	MF	MEX	Marco Cruz
26	MF	COL	Donovan Hernández
27	FW	MEX	Hugo Galván
28	MF	MEX	Jaime Arriaga
29	MF	MEX	Johan Lara
30	FW	MEX	Mauricio Farjeat
31	MF	MEX	Abraham Fernández
32	MF	MEX	Eder Morán
29	MF	MEX	Johan Lara
33	MF	MEX	Jorge Santillana
37	DF	MEX	Antonio Mondragón
38	MF	MEX	Héctor Romero
42	MF	MEX	Mariano Valencia

=== Reserve teams ===
Dragones Toluca (Liga TDP)
Reserve team that plays in the Liga TDP, the fourth level of the Mexican league system
