= Estadio Olímpico de Tapachula =

Stadium in Chiapas, Mexico

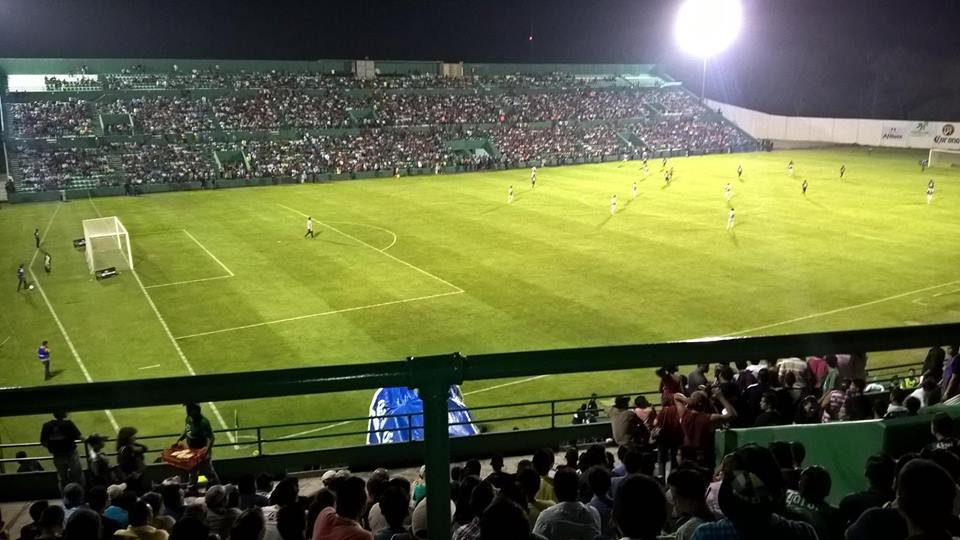
- Interactive map of Estadio Olímpico de Tapachula
- Full name: Estadio Olímpico de Tapachula
- Location: Tapachula, Chiapas, Mexico
- Coordinates: 14°52′07.09″N 92°17′32.20″W
- Owner: Ayuntamiento de Tapachula
- Capacity: 18,017
- Surface: Natural grass

Construction
- Opened: 10 October 1988
- Renovated: 2015

Tenants
- Jaguares de Tapachula (2003–2007); Ocelotes UNACH (2009–2015); Cafetaleros de Tapachula F.C. (2015–2019); Cafetaleros de Chiapas Premier (2019–2020); Tapachula Soconusco (2024–)

Estadio Olímpico de Tapachula is a multi-purpose stadium in Tapachula, Chiapas, Mexico. It is currently used mostly for football matches. The stadium seats 18,017 people. In 2015 the stadium was renovated in order to house Tapachula's Ascenso MX franchise, Cafetaleros de Tapachula. In 2017 the stadium expanded to 22,000, adding 11,000 more seats from its 2015 renovation.
