= 2024–25 Serie A de México season =

Serie A de México
- Season: 2024–25
- Champions: Apertura 2024: Aguacateros de Peribán (1st title); Clausura 2025: Irapuato (4th title)
- Promoted: Faraones de Texcoco; Acatlán; Tigres de Álica
- Matches: 486
- Goals: 1,428 (2.94 per match)
- Top goalscorer: Apertura 2024: Edgar Verduzco (16 goals); Clausura 2025: David García (18 goals)
- Biggest home win: Apertura 2024: La Piedad 6–0 Tecos (16 November 2024); Tecos 6–0 Zitácuaro (22 November 2024); Clausura 2025: Deportiva Venados 7–0 Acatlán (18 January 2025)
- Biggest away win: Apertura 2024: UAT 1–4 Aguacateros de Peribán (27 September 2024); Tapachula Soconusco 0–3 Pioneros de Cancún (27 September 2024); Clausura 2025: Atlético Aragón 0–5 Racing de Veracruz (14 February 2025)
- Highest scoring: Apertura 2024: Agricultores de Guasave 7–5 Cimarrones de Sonora (16 October 2024); Clausura 2025: Aguacateros de Peribán 7–1 Sporting Canamy (8 March 2025); Tuzos UAZ 2–6 Mineros de Fresnillo (2 April 2025)
- Longest winning run: Apertura 2024: 7 matches Tuzos UAZ; Clausura 2025: 6 matches Deportiva Venados
- Longest unbeaten run: Apertura 2024: 7 matches Aguacateros de Peribán; Jaguares; Clausura 2025: 13 matches Aguacateros de Peribán
- Longest winless run: Apertura 2024: 13 matches Colima; Clausura 2025: 14 matches Mexicali
- Longest losing run: Apertura 2024: 13 matches Colima; Clausura 2025: 14 matches Mexicali
- Highest attendance: Apertura 2024: 13,714; Jaguares vs Tapachula Soconusco (30 November 2024); Clausura 2025: 10,000; Jaguares vs Deportiva Venados (8 March 2025)
- Lowest attendance: Apertura 2024: 30; Halcones vs Sporting Canamy (13 September 2024); Mexicali vs Real Apodaca (9 November 2024); Clausura 2025: 20; Petroleros de Salamanca vs Irapuato (12 April 2025); Colima vs Acatlán (12 April 2025)
- Total attendance: Apertura 2024: 285,799; Clausura 2025: 272,602
- Average attendance: Apertura 2024: 1,155; Clausura 2025: 1,099
- Stats are from the regular season only

The 2024–25 Serie A de México season is part of the third-tier football league of Mexico. The tournament began on 6 September 2024 and finished on 18 May 2025.

== Offseason changes ==
- On May 11, 2024 Aguacateros CDU was promoted from Serie B to Serie A.
- On May 25, 2024 Acatlán was promoted from Liga TDP to Serie A.
- On May 26, 2024 Faraones de Texcoco was promoted from Liga TDP to Serie A.
- On June 17, 2024 Cimarrones de Sonora Premier was renamed to Cimarrones de Sonora because it became the club's main team after the beginning of the sale process of the team that played in Liga de Expansión MX.
- On June 28, 2024 Agricultores Guasave and Tapachula Soconusco joined the league as expansion teams.
- On June 28, 2024 Cafetaleros de Chiapas was renamed Jaguares F.C. Originally the team would be a reserve squad of a Liga de Expansión MX club, however on July 12, 2024, the project was rejected in the second tier of Mexican football, so finally Jaguares will compete in the Liga Premier – Serie A.
- On June 28, 2024, Racing Porto Palmeiras was renamed to Racing de Veracruz.
- On June 28, 2024 C.D. Avispones de Chilpancingo was promoted from Serie B to Serie A as an expansion team.
- On June 28, 2024 Tigres de Álica F.C. was promoted from Liga TDP to Serie A as an expansion team.
- On June 28, 2024 Calor and Saltillo were relocated to Serie B from Serie A.
- On June 28, 2024 Coras and Reynosa were put on hiatus.
- On June 28, 2024, the league format was modified, the two tournaments per season were reinstated after one year with a single-season tournament. In addition, three more weeks of competition were added in which teams from different groups will compete.
- On July 2, 2024, Halcones de Zapopan was renamed Halcones F.C., in addition the team was relocated to Querétaro City.
- On July 12, 2024 Tampico Madero was accepted in the Liga de Expansión MX after winning promotion on May 25. Alacranes de Durango had also opted for the promotion, however, this team was rejected by the league owners assembly.
- On July 21, 2024 Escorpiones Zacatepec was rebranded Zacatepec F.C.
- On July 24, 2024 Zitácuaro was promoted from Serie B to Serie A as an expansion team.

=== In–season changes ===
Apertura Tournament

- After Week 5 Petroleros de Salamanca was moved to Estadio El Molinito, due to the fact that the club did not obtain permission to remain in the Estadio Sección XXIV, which had caused the team to play its first two home games at the facilities of the Mexican Football Federation, located in Toluca.
- Since Week 5 Acatlán F.C. was relocated to Arandas, Jalisco because the stadium registered by the team was damaged by heavy rains that occurred in the region where the club was located.

Clausura Tournament

- On January 12, 2025 Zacatepec F.C. was relocated from Zacatepec to Xochitepec.
- On January 16, 2025 Agricultores F.C. was relocated from Guasave, Sinaloa to Ensenada, Baja California.

== Teams information ==
The member clubs of the Serie A for the 2024–25 season are listed as follows.

=== Group 1 ===
==== Stadium and locations ====
Location of teams in the 2024–25 Serie A Group 1

Club	Manager	City	Stadium	Capacity	Affiliate	Kit manufacturer	Shirt sponsor(s) front
Agricultores F.C.	(Mexico) Paolo Serrato	Ensenada, Baja California	Raúl Ramírez Lozano	7,600	–	DONY	–
Alacranes de Durango	(Mexico) Gastón Obledo	Durango City, Durango	Francisco Zarco	18,000	–	Keuka	#WeAreOne
Cimarrones de Sonora	(Mexico) Valentín Arredondo	Hermosillo, Sonora	Héroe de Nacozari	18,747	–	Keuka	PIPESO
Leones Negros UdeG	(Mexico) Ricardo Jiménez	Zapopan, Jalisco	Instalaciones Club Deportivo U.de G. Cancha 3	3,000	Leones Negros UdeG	Sporelli	Electrolit
Los Cabos United	(Mexico) Edson Alvarado	Los Cabos, Baja California Sur	Complejo Don Koll	3,500	–	Capelli Sport	Cabo Wabo
Mexicali	(Mexico) Omar Ramírez	Mexicali, Baja California	Ciudad Deportiva Mexicali	5,000	–	Oqiqo	Estructuras y Perfiles
Mineros de Fresnillo	(Mexico) Isaac Martínez	Fresnillo, Zacatecas	Unidad Deportiva Minera Fresnillo	6,000	Mineros de Zacatecas	Spiro	Fresnillo plc
Real Apodaca	(Mexico) Omar Gómez	Apodaca, Nuevo León	Centenario del Ejército Mexicano	2,000	–	Edcor	Financiera Altitud
Tecos	(Mexico) Jorge Hernández	Zapopan, Jalisco	Tres de Marzo	18,779	–	Marval	–
Tigres de Álica	(Mexico) Hugo López	Tepic, Nayarit	Nicolás Álvarez Ortega	12,495	–	In–house	Coca-Cola
Tritones Vallarta	(Mexico) Juan Pablo Alfaro	Bahía de Banderas, Nayarit	Ciudad del Deporte San José del Valle	4,000	–	Marval	–
Tuzos UAZ	(Mexico) Rubén Hernández	Zacatecas City, Zacatecas	Carlos Vega Villalba	20,068	–	In–house	Fresnillo plc

=== Group 2 ===
==== Stadium and locations ====
Location of teams in the 2024–25 Serie A Group 2

Club	Manager	City	Stadium	Capacity	Affiliate	Kit manufacturer	Shirt sponsor(s) front
Aguacateros CDU	(Mexico) Edgar Tolentino	Uruapan, Michoacán	Unidad Deportiva Hermanos López Rayón	6,000	Atlético Morelia	Keuka	Agromich, PFS
Aguacateros de Peribán	(Mexico) Marco Angúlo	Peribán, Michoacán	Municipal de Peribán	3,000	–	Silver Sport	SAR Avocados, Zavocado, YAMAV
Colima	(Mexico) Sergio Bueno	Colima City, Colima	Colima	12,000	–	Reator	Forma Interior
Gavilanes de Matamoros	(Mexico) Raúl Salazar	Matamoros, Tamaulipas	El Hogar	22,000	–	Keuka	KarzoGas, Blanquita Agua Purificada, HoGar, Alpha Team, Coca-Cola
Halcones	(Mexico) José Roberto Muñoz	Querétaro City, Querétaro	Olímpico de Querétaro	4,600	–	DONY	AXEN Capital
Irapuato	(Mexico) Víctor Medina	Irapuato, Guanajuato	Sergio León Chávez	25,000	–	UIN	Healthy People, Tonic Music Multimedia, TV Cuatro, MG Motor
La Piedad	(Mexico) Arturo Espinoza	La Piedad, Michoacán	Juan N. López	13,356	–	Silver Sport	Grupo Bafar, Bet Gigante, SMRTV
Lobos ULMX	(Colombia) Aquivaldo Mosquera	Celaya, Guanajuato	Miguel Alemán Valdés	23,182	Celaya	Keuka	TV Cuatro
Petroleros de Salamanca	(Mexico) Ana María Zavala (Interim)	Salamanca, Guanajuato	El Molinito	2,500	–	Jeva Sport	TV Cuatro
Sporting Canamy	(Mexico) Francisco Tena	Oaxtepec, Morelos	Olímpico de Oaxtepec	9,000	–	In–house	LEON
UAT	(Mexico) Jorge Dimas	Ciudad Victoria, Tamaulipas	Prof. Eugenio Alvizo Porras (Note: The team also plays some matches at the Estadio Marte R. Gómez)	5,000	UAT	Silver Sport	–
Zacatepec	(Mexico) Alfredo González	Xochitepec, Morelos	Mariano Matamoros	18,000	–	Silver Sport	–

=== Group 3 ===
==== Stadium and locations ====
Location of teams in the 2024–25 Serie A Group 3

Club	Manager	City	Stadium	Capacity	Affiliate	Kit manufacturer	Shirt sponsor(s) front
Acatlán (Note: The team is alternatively named CEFOR Tepatitlán and Trinca Guinda F.C.)	(Mexico) Pedro Ramírez	Arandas, Jalisco	Unidad Deportiva Gustavo Díaz Ordaz	2,000	–	Romed	Arandas
Atlético Aragón	(Mexico) Juan Pablo García	Cuautitlán, State of Mexico	Los Pinos	5,000	–	In–house	ACCON
Chilpancingo	(Argentina) Sebastián Lencina	Chilpancingo, Guerrero	General Vicente Guerrero	5,000	–	Also Sport	Gasolineras Also, Latinus Capital, Risval Corporation
Deportiva Venados	(Mexico) Alfredo García Salmones	Tamanché, Yucatán	Alonso Diego Molina	2,500	–	Foursport	–
Faraones de Texcoco	(Mexico) Oscar Linton	Texcoco, State of Mexico	Municipal Claudio Suárez	4,000	–	Real Sport	Turmar, Heraldo Media Group
Inter Playa del Carmen	(Argentina) Nicolás Burtovoy	Playa del Carmen, Quintana Roo	Unidad Deportiva Mario Villanueva Madrid	7,500	–	Foursport	Playa del Carmen
Jaguares	(Mexico) José Luis Trejo	Tuxtla Gutiérrez, Chiapas	Víctor Manuel Reyna	29,001	–	Romed	–
Montañeses	(Mexico) Andrés Garza	Orizaba, Veracruz	Socum	7,000	–	Silver Sport	Schettino, Tecate
Pioneros de Cancún	(Mexico) Jorge Salas	Cancún, Quintana Roo	Cancún 86	6,390	–	Kaan Sports	–
Racing de Veracruz	(Mexico) Guillermo Marín (Interim)	Boca del Río, Veracruz	Unidad Deportiva Hugo Sánchez	2,500	–	Joma	–
Tapachula Soconusco	(Mexico) Carlos Gómez	Tapachula, Chiapas	Olímpico de Tapachula	18,017	–	JAG Sportswear	Madererías Los Pinos
Zitácuaro	(Mexico) Gerardo Castillo	Zitácuaro, Michoacán	Ignacio López Rayón	10,000	–	BS	Grupo Orihuela

== Torneo Apertura ==
=== Group 1 ===
==== Standings ====
Pos	Team	Pld	W	D	L	GF	GA	GD	BP	Pts	Qualification or relegation
1	Cimarrones de Sonora	14	9	2	3	25	13	+12	2	31	Qualification to Liguilla de Ascenso
2	Tuzos UAZ	14	9	2	3	25	15	+10	0	29	Qualification to Liguilla de Ascenso
3	Alacranes de Durango	14	5	8	1	26	16	+10	3	26	Qualification to Liguilla de Ascenso
4	Leones Negros UdeG	14	7	3	4	19	12	+7	2	26	Qualification to Liguilla de Filiales
5	Tigres de Álica	14	8	1	5	19	12	+7	0	25	
6	Real Apodaca	14	6	4	4	25	26	−1	2	24	
7	Tecos	14	7	1	6	28	25	+3	1	23	
8	Tritones Vallarta	14	6	3	5	20	19	+1	2	23	
9	Agricultores de Guasave	14	6	2	6	29	27	+2	0	20	
10	Los Cabos United	14	4	1	9	11	28	−17	0	13	
11	Mineros de Fresnillo	14	2	3	9	18	22	−4	0	9	
12	Mexicali	14	1	3	10	6	26	−20	0	6	

Updated to match(es) played on 30 November 2024. Source: Liga Premier FMF

==== Positions by round ====
Leader and qualification to Liguilla quarter-finals
Qualification to quarter-finals
Possible qualification to quarter-finals
Last place in table

Team ╲ Round	1	2	3	4	5	6	7	8	9	10	11	12	13	14
Cimarrones de Sonora	6	4	4	2	1	1	1	1	1	1	1	1	1	1
Tuzos UAZ	5	2	5	3	6	10	7	8	5	6	3	3	2	2
Alacranes de Durango	3	6	8	5	3	2	3	3	6	2	2	2	3	3
Leones Negros UdeG	12	12	10	7	7	3	2	2	2	3	5	6	8	4
Tigres de Álica	2	1	1	1	2	4	4	5	3	4	6	4	7	5
Real Apodaca	9	10	7	10	8	6	5	4	7	7	7	9	6	6
Tecos	10	8	11	8	9	8	9	9	4	5	4	5	4	7
Tritones Vallarta	4	3	2	4	5	7	8	6	8	8	9	7	5	8
Agricultores de Guasave	1	5	3	6	4	5	6	7	9	9	8	8	9	9
Los Cabos United	7	7	6	9	10	9	10	10	10	10	10	10	10	10
Mineros de Fresnillo	8	9	12	11	11	11	11	11	11	11	11	11	11	11
Mexicali	11	11	9	12	12	12	12	12	12	12	12	12	12	12

Updated to match(es) played on 30 November 2024. Source: Liga Premier FMF

==== Results ====
Home \ Away	AGR	DUR	CIM	UDG	LCU	MXL	FRE	RAP	TEC	TIG	TRI	UAZ
Agricultores de Guasave	—	—	7–5	2–0	4–0	—	—	—	—	0–1	—	3–1
Alacranes de Durango	4–1	—	2–2	—	2–0	5–0	—	—	—	1–1	—	2–2
Cimarrones de Sonora	—	—	—	1–0	—	2–0	—	3–0	—	—	3–0	0–0
Leones Negros UdeG	—	0–0	—	—	4–0	—	1–0	2–2	2–1	—	1–1	—
Los Cabos United	—	—	3–2	—	—	—	—	2–2	0–1	0–1	2–1	0–1
Mexicali	0–0	—	—	1–2	0–1	—	1–1	1–1	0–2	—	1–2	—
Mineros de Fresnillo	1–1	2–2	0–3	—	4–0	—	—	—	—	0–1	—	2–3
Real Apodaca	3–2	1–4	—	—	—	—	2–1	—	3–2	2–0	—	—
Tecos	2–1	4–0	0–1	—	—	—	2–1	—	—	3–2	—	—
Tigres de Álica	—	—	0–1	1–0	—	1–0	—	—	—	—	0–2	3–0
Tritones Vallarta	3–0	1–1	—	—	—	—	2–1	1–3	1–1	—	—	—
Tuzos UAZ	—	—	—	0–1	—	4–0	—	3–1	2–1	—	3–0	—

Updated to match(es) played on 20 November 2024. Source: Liga Premier FMF
Legend: Blue = home team win; Yellow = draw; Red = away team win.

=== Group 2 ===
==== Standings ====
Pos	Team	Pld	W	D	L	GF	GA	GD	BP	Pts	Qualification or relegation
1	Aguacateros de Peribán (C)	14	10	3	1	33	10	+23	4	37	Qualification to Liguilla de Ascenso
2	Petroleros de Salamanca (Note: Petroleros de Salamanca was excluded from the Liguilla due to financial problems and debts.)	14	9	3	2	30	14	+16	4	34	
3	Irapuato	14	9	4	1	18	8	+10	2	33	Qualification to Liguilla de Ascenso
4	Gavilanes de Matamoros	14	8	5	1	29	15	+14	3	32	
5	La Piedad	14	7	3	4	32	19	+13	3	27	
6	Aguacateros CDU	14	6	3	5	21	22	−1	3	24	Qualification to Liguilla de Filiales
7	Zacatepec	14	5	4	5	23	21	+2	2	21	
8	Sporting Canamy	14	3	2	9	30	36	−6	1	12	
9	Halcones	14	2	4	8	12	20	−8	1	11	
10	Lobos ULMX	14	1	8	5	13	22	−9	0	11	Qualification to Liguilla de Filiales
11	UAT	14	3	2	9	15	33	−18	0	11	Qualification to Liguilla de Filiales
12	Colima	14	1	0	13	9	32	−23	0	3	

Updated to match(es) played on 1 December 2024. Source: Liga Premier FMF
(C) Champions

==== Positions by round ====
Leader and qualification to Liguilla quarter-finals
Qualification to quarter-finals
Possible qualification to quarter-finals
Last place in table

Team ╲ Round	1	2	3	4	5	6	7	8	9	10	11	12	13	14
Aguacateros de Peribán	1	4	5	3	2	3	2	5	3	3	2	2	1	1
Petroleros de Salamanca	12	5	4	4	4	5	5	4	4	1	1	1	2	2
Irapuato	2	1	1	2	1	2	4	3	5	5	3	4	3	3
Gavilanes de Matamoros	3	2	2	1	3	1	1	1	1	4	4	3	4	4
La Piedad	4	6	7	8	8	6	6	7	6	6	6	7	6	5
Aguacateros CDU	5	8	8	7	5	4	3	2	2	2	5	5	5	6
Zacatepec	8	10	10	10	10	9	8	6	7	7	7	6	7	7
Sporting Canamy	10	3	3	5	6	7	7	8	9	9	11	9	10	8
Halcones	7	11	11	9	9	11	9	9	8	8	9	10	11	49
Lobos ULMX	6	7	6	6	7	8	10	10	10	10	10	11	9	10
UAT	11	9	9	11	11	10	11	11	11	11	8	8	8	11
Colima	9	12	12	12	12	12	12	12	12	12	12	12	12	12

Updated to match(es) played on 1 December 2024. Source: Liga Premier FMF

==== Results ====
Home \ Away	ADU	APB	COL	GAV	HAL	IRA	LPD	LUM	SAL	SCA	UAT	ZAC
Aguacateros CDU	—	—	—	1–2	—	1–3	—	—	2–2	2–1	2–1	2–1
Aguacateros de Peribán	2–2	—	2–0	—	—	—	—	6–2	2–0	—	—	2–0
Colima	1–2	—	—	1–3	—	0–1	—	—	0–2	—	—	1–2
Gavilanes de Matamoros	—	2–0	—	—	1–1	0–2	2–2	—	—	—	4–1	—
Halcones	2–3	0–3	3–0	—	—	—	—	0–0	0–1	0–2	—	—
Irapuato	—	1–1	—	—	1–0	—	2–1	0–0	—	—	1–0	—
La Piedad	1–3	0–0	4–0	—	0–1	—	—	1–1	—	4–2	—	—
Lobos ULMX	1–1	—	2–0	1–2	—	—	—	—	0–2	—	—	1–4
Petroleros de Salamanca	—	—	—	2–2	—	0–1	3–1	—	—	3–1	4–0	3–1
Sporting Canamy	—	2–4	5–2	3–4	—	1–2	—	1–1	—	—	2–3	—
UAT	—	1–4	1–0	—	2–1	—	1–3	0–0	—	—	—	—
Zacatepec	—	—	—	1–1	0–0	3–1	0–1	—	—	3–2	1–1	—

Updated to match(es) played on 22 November 2024. Source: Liga Premier FMF
Legend: Blue = home team win; Yellow = draw; Red = away team win.

=== Group 3 ===
==== Standings ====
Pos	Team	Pld	W	D	L	GF	GA	GD	BP	Pts	Qualification or relegation
1	Pioneros de Cancún	14	6	6	2	23	14	+9	2	26	Qualification to Liguilla de Ascenso
2	Inter Playa del Carmen	14	7	4	3	23	16	+7	1	26	Qualification to Liguilla de Ascenso
3	Faraones de Texcoco	14	6	4	4	26	20	+6	2	24	
4	Jaguares	14	6	5	3	21	16	+5	1	24	
5	Acatlán	14	5	5	4	23	25	−2	2	22	
6	Montañeses	14	6	3	5	16	15	+1	0	21	
7	Deportiva Venados	14	5	3	6	18	21	−3	0	18	
8	Racing de Veracruz	14	4	4	6	14	17	−3	1	17	
9	Zitácuaro	14	4	4	6	18	23	−5	1	17	
10	Tapachula Soconusco	14	3	6	5	16	21	−5	0	15	
11	Chilpancingo	14	2	5	7	13	21	−8	1	12	
12	Atlético Aragón	14	1	3	10	5	30	−25	0	6	

Updated to match(es) played on 1 December 2024. Source: Liga Premier FMF

==== Positions by round ====
Leader and qualification to Liguilla quarter-finals
Qualification to quarter-finals
Possible qualification to quarter-finals
Last place in table

Team ╲ Round	1	2	3	4	5	6	7	8	9	10	11	12	13	14
Pioneros de Cancún	3	6	3	1	3	5	5	5	5	2	2	2	1	1
Inter Playa del Carmen	2	1	2	2	1	3	1	1	1	1	1	1	2	2
Faraones de Texcoco	4	2	5	7	8	6	7	6	4	3	3	5	5	3
Jaguares	1	3	4	3	4	1	3	4	7	4	7	3	3	4
Acatlán	6	7	6	6	7	8	10	10	10	11	9	4	4	5
Montañeses	8	4	1	5	2	4	2	3	3	6	8	9	7	6
Deportiva Venados	10	9	7	8	6	7	6	7	6	7	6	6	6	7
Racing de Veracruz	11	5	8	4	5	2	4	2	2	5	5	8	8	8
Zitácuaro	9	10	9	9	9	9	9	8	8	8	4	7	9	9
Tapachula Soconusco	5	11	11	12	12	12	12	11	11	10	10	10	10	10
Chilpancingo	7	8	10	10	11	10	8	9	9	9	11	11	11	11
Atlético Aragón	12	12	12	11	10	11	11	12	12	12	12	12	12	12

Updated to match(es) played on 1 December 2024. Source: Liga Premier FMF

==== Results ====
Home \ Away	ACA	ARA	CHI	DVE	FAR	INP	JAG	MON	PIO	RVE	TAP	ZIT
Acatlán	—	2–1	—	1–1	—	1–3	4–1	—	2–2	2–2	—	—
Atlético Aragón	—	—	1–0	0–0	0–0	—	—	1–2	—	—	1–1	0–3
Chilpancingo	1–3	—	—	2–0	—	2–2	1–1	—	0–1	1–1	—	—
Deportiva Venados	—	—	—	—	1–2	1–2	1–0	—	2–0	—	2–1	3–2
Faraones de Texcoco	3–0	—	3–3	—	—	1–1	0–1	—	3–1	—	—	—
Inter Playa del Carmen	—	2–0	—	—	—	—	—	1–1	—	1–0	3–0	3–1
Jaguares	—	3–0	—	—	—	1–1	—	3–0	1–1	1–1	—	—
Montañeses	0–0	—	2–0	0–1	2–1	—	—	—	—	—	4–1	0–1
Pioneros de Cancún	—	5–0	—	—	—	2–1	—	0–0	—	1–0	—	1–1
Racing de Veracruz	—	1–0	—	2–0	1–2	—	—	2–0	—	—	1–1	1–0
Tapachula Soconusco	4–0	—	1–0	—	2–2	—	0–1	—	0–3	—	—	—
Zitácuaro	1–1	—	0–0	—	1–0	—	4–2	—	—	—	1–1	—

Updated to match(es) played on 13 November 2024. Source: Liga Premier FMF
Legend: Blue = home team win; Yellow = draw; Red = away team win.

=== Inter–group weeks ===
Starting this season, the Liga Premier FMF has introduced three additional weeks of games between teams from different groups, which will take place in weeks 12, 13 and 14 of the calendar. The league has established that the teams will be divided into nine subgroups, and these points will be added to the normal tables of their respective groups, although with separate results.

==== Week 1 ====
- Inter Playa del Carmen 0 – 3 Petroleros de Salamanca
- Leones Negros 1 – 2 Acatlán
- Chilpancingo 1 – 3 Zacatepec
- Aguacateros CDU 0 – 1 Cimarrones de Sonora
- Deportiva Venados 1 – 1 Irapuato
- Pioneros de Cancún (3) 3 – 3 (0) Sporting Canamy
- Aguacateros de Peribán 4 – 0 Mexicali
- Tigres de Álica 5 – 0 Atlético Aragón
- Tritones Vallarta 4 – 2 Faraones de Texcoco
- Tuzos UAZ 2 – 1 Montañeses
- Zitácuaro 0 – 1 Agricultores de Guasave
- Mineros de Fresnillo 4 – 0 Racing de Veracruz
- Tapachula Soconusco 2 – 1 Halcones
- La Piedad 6 – 0 Tecos
- Jaguares 2 – 1 Lobos ULMX
- Gavilanes de Matamoros 1 – 0 Real Apodaca
- Los Cabos United 1 – 0 Colima
- Alacranes de Durango 2 – 1 UAT

==== Week 2 ====
- Halcones 1 – 3 Jaguares
- Tecos 6 – 1 Zitácuaro
- Faraones de Texcoco 3 – 2 Tigres de Álica
- Atlético Aragón 0 – 2 Tritones Vallarta
- Sporting Canamy 1 – 2 Chilpancingo
- Petroleros de Salamanca 5 – 4 Deportiva Venados
- Mexicali 2 – 0 Aguacateros CDU
- Colima 1 – 2 Leones Negros
- Irapuato 2 – 0 Inter Playa del Carmen
- Zacatepec 1 – 1 Pioneros de Cancún
- Tapachula Soconusco 1 – 1 Lobos ULMX
- Racing de Veracruz 1 – 2 Tuzos UAZ
- Agricultores de Guasave 2 – 4 La Piedad
- Gavilanes de Matamoros 0 – 0 Alacranes de Durango
- Montañeses 2 – 1 Mineros de Fresnillo
- Acatlán 3 – 2 Los Cabos United
- Real Apodaca 4 – 3 UAT
- Cimarrones de Sonora 0 – 1 Aguacateros de Peribán

==== Week 3 ====
- UAT 0 – 5 Gavilanes de Matamoros
- Inter Playa del Carmen 3 – 1 Deportiva Venados
- Faraones de Texcoco 4 – 1 Atlético Aragón
- Alacranes de Durango 1 – 1 Real Apodaca
- Aguacateros CDU 0 – 2 Aguacateros de Peribán
- Pioneros de Cancún 2 – 0 Chilpancingo
- Sporting Canamy 4 – 3 Zacatepec
- Mexicali 0 – 1 Cimarrones de Sonora
- Tritones Vallarta 0 – 1 Tigres de Álica
- Zitácuaro 2 – 4 La Piedad
- Tuzos UAZ 2 – 0 Mineros de Fresnillo
- Lobos ULMX (0) 2 – 2 (3) Halcones
- Jaguares 1 – 1 Tapachula Soconusco
- Irapuato 0 – 0 Petroleros de Salamanca
- Agricultores de Guasave 5 – 3 Tecos
- Los Cabos United 0 – 3 Leones Negros
- Montañeses 2 – 1 Racing de Veracruz
- Acatlán 2 – 3 Colima

=== Regular season statistics ===
==== Top goalscorers ====
Players sorted first by goals scored, then by last name.

Rank	Player	Club	Goals
1	(Mexico) Edgar Verduzco	Agricultores de Guasave	16
2	(Brazil) Andrey	Real Apodaca	13
3	(Argentina) Leonardo Herrlein	Zacatepec	10
4	(Mexico) Diego Armando Núñez	Petroleros de Salamanca	9
5	(Colombia) Klinsman Calderón	Jaguares	8
6	(Colombia) Dairo Berrio	Sporting Canamy	7
6	(Mexico) David García	Aguacateros de Peribán	7
8	(Mexico) Juan Carlos Hernández	Tuzos UAZ	6
8	(Mexico) Christian Martínez	Inter Playa del Carmen	6
8	(Mexico) Carlos Muñoz	Gavilanes de Matamoros	6
8	(Mexico) Juan Ornelas	Petroleros de Salamanca	6
8	(Mexico) Pedro Pacheco	Tecos	6
8	(Mexico) Daniel Rojas	Faraones de Texcoco	6
8	(Mexico) Brian Zavala	Tritones Vallarta	6

Source:Liga Premier FMF

==== Hat-tricks ====
Player	For	Against	Result	Date	Round	Reference
(Brazil) Andrey	Real Apodaca	Tritones Vallarta	1 – 3 (A)	16 October 2024	7	
(Mexico) Edgar Verduzco	Agricultores de Guasave	Cimarrones de Sonora	7 – 5 (H)	16 October 2024	7	
(Mexico) Gustavo Miranda	Faraones de Texcoco	Chilpancingo	3 – 3 (H)	19 October 2024	8	
(Mexico) Christian Sánchez	Tecos	Alacranes de Durango	3 – 0 (H)	20 October 2024	8	
(Mexico) Brian Zavala	Tritones Vallarta	Agricultores de Guasave	3 – 0 (H)	13 November 2024	10	
(Mexico) Cristian Ortíz	Tigres de Álica	Atlético Aragón	5 – 0 (H)	16 November 2024	12	
(Brazil) Andrey	Real Apodaca	Agricultores de Guasave	3 – 2 (H)	20 November 2024	8	
(Ecuador) Santiago Micolta	Deportiva Venados	Petroleros de Salamanca	5 – 4 (H)	23 November 2024	13	
(Mexico) Edgar Verduzco	Agricultores de Guasave	Tecos	5 – 3 (H)	30 November 2024	14	

(H) – Home; (A) – Away

=== Attendance ===
==== Per team ====
Pos	Team	Total	High	Low	Average	Change
1	Jaguares	69,323	13,714	7,800	9,903	+856.8%^{7}
2	Irapuato	39,749	10,000	4,000	5,678	−51.5%
3	Tapachula Soconusco	36,474	12,040	1,500	5,211	n/a^{4}
4	Gavilanes de Matamoros	22,648	7,000	1,248	3,235	+28.0%
5	Faraones de Texcoco	21,500	5,000	1,500	3,071	n/a^{3}
6	Montañeses	12,300	2,000	1,100	1,538	+10.3%
7	Alacranes de Durango	9,850	2,000	800	1,231	+17.9%
8	Racing de Veracruz	7,450	2,000	250	1,064	+3.2%
9	Inter Playa del Carmen	5,300	2,000	200	757	+0.1%
10	Tigres de Álica	4,500	1,500	200	750	n/a^{3}
11	Petroleros de Salamanca	5,228	1,978	50	747	−71.6%^{8}
12	Zitácuaro	5,009	1,000	409	716	+251.0%^{2}
13	La Piedad	3,300	1,500	500	660	−66.3%^{9}
14	Pioneros de Cancún	4,067	917	300	581	+217.5%
15	Chilpancingo	3,900	2,000	300	557	+21.6%^{2}
16	Zacatepec	3,650	1,000	200	521	−53.0%^{5}
17	Aguacateros de Peribán	2,900	1,200	200	483	−24.5%
18	Aguacateros CDU	3,800	1,000	300	475	+15.3%^{2}
19	Deportiva Venados	2,950	1,000	200	421	+159.9%
20	Agricultores de Guasave	2,600	1,000	200	371	n/a^{4}
21	Cimarrones de Sonora	1,605	518	250	321	−67.5%^{1,9}
22	Acatlán	2,300	500	100	288	n/a^{3,8}
23	Los Cabos United	2,200	400	100	275	−76.9%
24	Tecos	1,550	400	150	258	+16.7%
25	Tritones Vallarta	1,650	400	100	236	−0.8%
26	Real Apodaca	1,250	500	200	208	−34.8%
27	UAT	1,050	200	100	175	−33.2%
28	Atlético Aragón	1,200	350	100	171	−8.1%
29	Sporting Canamy	1,330	500	50	166	−12.6%
30	Lobos ULMX	1,000	350	80	167	−29.2%
31	Colima	950	400	50	158	−47.5%
32	Tuzos UAZ	980	300	50	140	−32.4%^{8}
33	Mineros de Fresnillo	950	200	50	136	−34.3%
34	Leones Negros	673	200	50	112	+21.7%
35	Halcones	580	200	30	97	−56.1%^{6,8,9}
36	Mexicali	823	200	30	91	−38.5%^{8}
	League total	285,799	13,714	30	1,155	+5.0%

Source: Liga Premier FMF
Notes:
Only regular season listed
1: Cimarrones de Sonora played Liga de Expansión MX last season.
2: Team played Liga Premier – Serie B last season.
3: Team played Liga TDP last season.
4: Team did not play last season.
5: Zacatepec played last season as Escorpiones Zacatepec
6: Halcones played last season at Zapotlanejo, Jalisco.
7: Jaguares played last season as Cafetaleros de Chiapas.
8: The team played at least one match on an alternative field
9: The team played at least one match behind closed doors

==== Highest and lowest ====
Highest attended					Lowest attended			
Week	Home	Score	Away	Attendance	Home	Score	Away	Attendance
1	Jaguares	3–0	Atlético Aragón	7,800	Lobos ULMX	1–1	Aguacateros CDU	80
2	Faraones de Texcoco	3–1	Pioneros de Cancún	2,500	Halcones	0–2	Sporting Canamy	30
3	Jaguares	1–1	Racing de Veracruz	9,009	Leones Negros UdeG	0–0	Alacranes de Durango	100
4	Irapuato	0–0	Lobos ULMX	5,499	Mexicali	1–2	Leones Negros UdeG	43
5	Jaguares	1–1	Inter Playa del Carmen	10,000	Halcones	2–3	Aguacateros CDU	50
6	Tapachula Soconusco	0–1	Jaguares	12,040	Colima	1–2	Zacatepec	100
7	Jaguares	1–1	Pioneros de Cancún	11,100	Sporting Canamy	3–4	Gavilanes de Matamoros	50
8	Irapuato	1–0	Halcones	4,000	Colima	0–2	Petroleros de Salamanca	50
9	Petroleros de Salamanca	3–1	Irapuato	1,978	Los Cabos United	2–1	Tritones Vallarta	100
10	Irapuato	2–1	La Piedad	10,000	Sporting Canamy	2–3	UAT	60
11	Faraones de Texcoco	1–1	Inter Playa	4,500	Mexicali	1–1	Real Apodaca	30
12	Jaguares	2–1	Lobos ULMX	8,800	Mineros de Fresnillo	4–0	Racing de Veracruz	50
13	Gavilanes de Matamoros	0–0	Durango	7,000	Mexicali	2–0	Aguacateros CDU	50
14	Jaguares	1–1	Tapachula Soconusco	13,714	Tuzos UAZ	2–0	Mineros de Fresnillo	50

Source: Liga Premier FMF

1. Does not include matches played behind closed doors.

=== Liguilla ===
==== Liguilla de Ascenso ====
The two best teams and the two best third places of each group play two games against each other on a home-and-away basis. The higher seeded teams play on their home field during the second leg. The winner of each match up is determined by aggregate score. In the quarterfinals and semifinals, if the two teams are tied on aggregate the higher seeded team advances. In the final, if the two teams are tied after both legs, the match goes to extra time and, if necessary, a penalty shoot-out.

Quarter-finals
1	Aguacateros de Peribán
------
5	Tuzos UAZ	1	1	2
6	Alacranes de Durango	1	3	4
3	Irapuato (s)	1	3	4
8	Inter Playa del Carmen	4	0	4
4	Cimarrones de Sonora (s)	0	2	2
7	Pioneros de Cancún	0	2	2

Semi-finals
1	Aguacateros de Peribán (s)	0	1	1
6	Alacranes de Durango	1	0	1
3	Irapuato	0	3	3
4	Cimarrones de Sonora	1	0	1

Final
1	Aguacateros de Peribán (p)	0	3	3 (3)
3	Irapuato	0	3	3 (1)

===== Quarter-finals =====
The first legs were played on 4 and 5 December, and the second legs were played on 7 and 8 December 2024.

Team 1	Agg.	Team 2	1st leg	2nd leg
Irapuato (s)	4–4	Inter Playa del Carmen	1–4	3–0
Cimarrones de Sonora (s)	2–2	Pioneros de Cancún	0–0	2–2
Tuzos UAZ	2–4	Alacranes de Durango	1–1	1–3

Matches

4 December 2024
19:00 EST (UTC−5)

Inter Playa del Carmen	4–1	Irapuato
Guzmán 45+3', 45+4', 54'; Godínez 90+7'	Report	Díaz 88'

Estadio Mario Villanueva Madrid, Playa del Carmen
Attendance: 3,500
Referee: Oscar Guajardo Medina
7 December 2024
19:00 CST (UTC−6)

Irapuato	3–0	Inter Playa del Carmen
Rangel 19', 35'; Díaz 58'	Report

Estadio Juan N. López, La Piedad
Attendance: 400
Referee: Gerardo Yahir Mendoza Sánchez

4–4 on aggregate. Irapuato advanced due to being the higher seeded team.

5 December 2024
15:30 EST (UTC−5)

Pioneros de Cancún	0–0	Cimarrones de Sonora
	Report

Estadio Cancún 86, Cancún
Attendance: 1,000
Referee: Alfredo Huerta López
8 December 2024
19:00 MST (UTC−7)

Cimarrones de Sonora	2–2	Pioneros de Cancún
Navarro 32'; Payares 36'	Report	Hernández 74'; González 90+6'

Estadio Héroe de Nacozari, Hermosillo
Attendance: 600
Referee: Iván Alberto Salazar Hernández

2–2 on aggregate. Cimarrones de Sonora advanced due to being the higher seeded team.

4 December 2024
20:00 CST (UTC−6)

Alacranes de Durango	1–1	Tuzos UAZ
Quintero 90'	Report	Jiménez 74'

Estadio Francisco Zarco, Durango
Attendance: 3,500
Referee: Erick González Miranda
7 December 2024
19:00 CST (UTC−6)

Tuzos UAZ	1–3	Alacranes de Durango
Villa 90+3'	Report	García 2'; Mejía 36'; Quiñones 71'

Estadio Carlos Vega Villalba, Zacatecas
Attendance: 1,500
Referee: José Maximiliano Negrete Preciado

Durango won 2–4 on aggregate.

===== Semi-finals =====
The first legs were played on 11 December, and the second legs were played on 14 December 2024.

Team 1	Agg.	Team 2	1st leg	2nd leg
Aguacateros de Peribán (s)	1–1	Alacranes de Durango	0–1	1–0
Irapuato	3–1	Cimarrones de Sonora	0–1	3–0

Matches

11 December 2024
20:00 CST (UTC−6)

Alacranes de Durango	1–0	Aguacateros de Peribán
Reyes 58'	Report

Estadio Francisco Zarco, Durango
Attendance: 4,000
Referee: José Maximiliano Negrete Preciado
14 December 2024
16:00 CST (UTC−6)

Aguacateros de Peribán	1–0	Alacranes de Durango
García 78'	Report

Estadio Municipal, Peribán
Attendance: 850
Referee: Gerardo Yahir Mendoza Sánchez

1–1 on aggregate. Aguacateros de Peribán advanced due to being the higher seeded team.

11 December 2024
19:00 MST (UTC−7)

Cimarrones de Sonora	1–0	Irapuato
Solórzano 90+3'	Report

Estadio Héroe de Nacozari, Hermosillo
Attendance: 420
Referee: Iván Alberto Salazar Hernández
14 December 2024
19:00 CST (UTC−6)

Irapuato	3–0	Cimarrones de Sonora
Díaz 25'; Santana 37'; Ruiz 44'	Report

Estadio Sergio León Chávez, Irapuato
Attendance: 10,000
Referee: Alfredo Huerta López

Irapuato won 3–0 on aggregate.

===== Final =====
The first leg was played on 19 December, and the second leg was played on 22 December 2024.

Team 1	Agg.	Team 2	1st leg	2nd leg
Aguacateros de Peribán (p)	3–3 (3–1)	Irapuato	0–0	3–3

Matches

19 December 2024
20:00 CST (UTC−6)

Irapuato	0–0	Aguacateros de Peribán
	Report

Estadio Sergio León Chávez, Irapuato
Attendance: 18,000
Referee: Iván Alberto Salazar Hernández
22 December 2024
12:00 CST (UTC−6)

Aguacateros de Peribán	3–3	Irapuato
Gómez 24'; Martínez 90+8'; García 108'	Report	Rangel 8'; Lumbreras 85', 115'
Penalties
Martínez (penalty missed); González (penalty scored); Cerda (penalty missed); Huerta (penalty scored); Zamora (penalty scored)	3–1	Ruiz (penalty scored); Vieira (penalty missed); Sosa (penalty missed); Reyes (penalty missed)

Estadio Municipal, Peribán
Attendance: 1,600
Referee: Gerardo Yahir Mendoza Sánchez

3-3 on aggregate. Aguacateros de Peribán won 3–1 on the penalty shoot–out.

==== Liguilla de Filiales ====
The four best reserve teams of the season play two games against each other on a home-and-away basis. The higher seeded teams play on their home field during the second leg. The winner of each match up is determined by aggregate score. In the semifinals, if the two teams are tied on aggregate the higher seeded team advances. In the final, if the two teams are tied after both legs, the match goes to extra time and, if necessary, a penalty shoot-out.

Semi–finals
1	Leones Negros	1	3	4
4	UAT	0	0	0
2	Aguacateros CDU	1	3	4
3	Lobos ULMX	0	2	2

Final
1	Leones Negros	1	1	2 (3)
2	Aguacateros CDU (p)	1	1	2 (4)

===== Semi-finals =====
The first legs were played on 4 December, and the second legs were played on 7 December 2024.

Team 1	Agg.	Team 2	1st leg	2nd leg
Leones Negros	4–0	UAT	1–0	3–0
Aguacateros CDU	4–2	Lobos ULMX	1–0	3–2

Matches

4 December 2024
10:00 CST (UTC−6)

UAT	0–1	Leones Negros
	Report	Madrigal 42'

Estadio Prof. Eugenio Alvizo Porras, Ciudad Victoria
Attendance: 200
Referee: Carlos Iván Trejo Saldívar
7 December 2024
11:00 CST (UTC−6)

Leones Negros	3–0	UAT
Hernández 4'; Muñoz 55'; Torres 90'	Report

Club Deportivo La Primavera, Zapopan
Attendance: 150
Referee: Ignacio Góngora García

Leones Negros won 4-0 on aggregate.

4 December 2024
18:00 CST (UTC−6)

Lobos ULMX	0–1	Aguacateros CDU
	Report	Molina 42'

Estadio Miguel Alemán Valdés, Celaya
Attendance: 250
Referee: Jorge Alfonso Resendiz Espinoza
7 December 2024
15:30 CST (UTC−6)

Aguacateros CDU	3–2	Lobos ULMX
Pahua 5'; Chávez 28', 71'	Report	Ledezma 8', 44'

Unidad Deportiva Hermanos López Rayón, Uruapan
Attendance: 800
Referee: Fernando Alexis Portillo Botello

Aguacateros CDU won 4-2 on aggregate.

===== Final =====
The first leg was played on 11 December, and the second leg was played on 14 December 2024.

Team 1	Agg.	Team 2	1st leg	2nd leg
Leones Negros	2–2 (3–4)	(p) Aguacateros CDU	1–1	1–1

Matches

11 December 2024
15:30 CST (UTC−6)

Aguacateros CDU	1–1	Leones Negros
Flores 46'	Report	Hernández 45'

Unidad Deportiva Hermanos López Rayón, Uruapan
Attendance: 2,000
Referee: Ignacio Góngora García
14 December 2024
11:00 CST (UTC−6)

Leones Negros	1–1	Aguacateros CDU
Becerra 59'	Report	Sánchez 69'
Penalties
	3–4

Club Deportivo La Primavera, Zapopan
Attendance: 300
Referee: Carlos Iván Trejo Saldívar

1–1 on aggregate. Aguacateros CDU won 3–4 on the penalty shoot–out

== Torneo Clausura ==
The Clausura tournament will begin on 10 January 2025.

=== Group 1 ===
==== Standings ====
Pos	Team	Pld	W	D	L	GF	GA	GD	BP	Pts	Qualification or relegation
1	Cimarrones de Sonora	14	9	2	3	29	9	+20	2	31	Qualification to Liguilla de Ascenso
2	Real Apodaca	14	9	1	4	20	14	+6	2	30	Qualification to Liguilla de Ascenso
3	Alacranes de Durango	14	8	4	2	19	10	+9	1	29	Qualification to Liguilla de Ascenso
4	Los Cabos United	14	8	2	4	30	17	+13	2	28	
5	Tigres de Álica	14	7	1	6	22	18	+4	2	24	
6	Tecos	14	5	5	4	20	17	+3	2	22	
7	Leones Negros UdeG	14	7	1	6	22	20	+2	0	22	Qualification to Liguilla de Filiales
8	Tuzos UAZ	14	6	1	7	22	28	−6	3	22	
9	Tritones Vallarta	14	5	4	5	16	15	+1	2	21	
10	Mineros de Fresnillo	14	5	1	8	19	22	−3	1	17	Qualification to Liguilla de Filiales
11	Agricultores F.C.	14	4	2	8	17	27	−10	2	16	
12	Mexicali	14	0	0	14	6	35	−29	0	0	

Updated to match(es) played on 13 April 2025. Source: Liga Premier FMF

==== Positions by round ====
Leader and qualification to Liguilla quarter-finals
Qualification to quarter-finals
Possible qualification to quarter-finals
Last place in table

Team ╲ Round	1	2	3	4	5	6	7	8	9	10	11	12	13	14
Cimarrones de Sonora	2	1	1	1	1	1	1	2	3	1	1	1	2	1
Real Apodaca	9	6	8	7	10	7	5	3	1	2	2	2	1	2
Alacranes de Durango	8	8	7	4	4	2	3	4	4	4	3	3	3	3
Los Cabos United	1	4	5	9	5	3	2	1	2	3	4	4	4	4
Tigres de Álica	3	2	2	2	6	9	6	8	5	8	8	6	6	5
Tecos	11	12	12	11	11	11	9	9	7	5	5	7	8	6
Leones Negros UdeG	7	9	10	10	9	6	8	6	9	7	6	5	5	7
Tuzos UAZ	12	11	9	5	8	10	11	11	11	10	9	9	9	8
Tritones Vallarta	5	3	4	8	7	8	10	7	8	6	7	8	7	9
Mineros de Fresnillo	4	5	3	3	2	4	4	5	6	9	10	10	10	10
Agricultores	6	7	6	6	3	5	7	10	10	11	11	11	11	11
Mexicali	10	10	11	12	12	12	12	12	12	12	12	12	12	12

Updated to match(es) played on 13 April 2025. Source: Liga Premier FMF

==== Results ====
Home \ Away	AGR	DUR	CIM	UDG	LCU	MXL	FRE	RAP	TEC	TIG	TRI	UAZ
Agricultores F.C.	—	0–0	—	—	—	2–0	2–2	0–3	0–3	—	1–3	—
Alacranes de Durango	—	—	—	2–1	—	—	4–2	2–0	0–0	—	0–1	—
Cimarrones de Sonora	2–1	0–0	—	—	2–1	—	3–0	—	4–1	2–0	—	—
Leones Negros UdeG	2–1	—	3–1	—	—	2–0	—	—	—	2–1	—	2–1
Los Cabos United	3–0	1–2	—	2–0	—	3–1	1–0	—	—	—	—	—
Mexicali	—	0–1	0–5	—	—	—	—	—	—	0–2	—	2–4
Mineros de Fresnillo	—	—	—	2–1	—	2–1	—	2–0	0–2	—	2–0	—
Real Apodaca	—	—	1–0	3–1	1–3	1–0	—	—	—	—	1–0	3–1
Tecos	—	—	—	2–1	1–4	3–0	—	0–1	—	—	2–2	1–1
Tigres de Álica	2–0	1–3	—	—	3–2	—	1–0	1–2	1–1	—	—	—
Tritones Vallarta	—	—	0–0	1–2	0–0	2–0	—	—	—	2–1	—	0–2
Tuzos UAZ	0–2	2–0	0–3	—	4–3	—	2–6	—	—	3–2	—	—

Updated to match(es) played on 2 April 2025. Source: Liga Premier FMF
Legend: Blue = home team win; Yellow = draw; Red = away team win.

=== Group 2 ===
==== Standings ====
Pos	Team	Pld	W	D	L	GF	GA	GD	BP	Pts	Qualification or relegation
1	Aguacateros de Peribán	14	10	3	1	35	12	+23	2	35	Qualification to Liguilla de Ascenso
2	Irapuato (C)	14	10	1	3	33	13	+20	3	34	Qualification to Liguilla de Ascenso
3	Halcones	14	9	3	2	24	11	+13	4	34	Qualification to Liguilla de Ascenso
4	La Piedad	14	7	3	4	26	16	+10	2	26	
5	Gavilanes de Matamoros	14	5	5	4	28	23	+5	3	23	
6	Zacatepec	14	6	1	7	19	20	−1	1	20	
7	Lobos ULMX	14	5	4	5	17	22	−5	1	20	Qualification to Liguilla de Filiales
8	UAT	14	5	3	6	17	12	+5	0	18	Qualification to Liguilla de Filiales
9	Colima	14	4	2	8	8	29	−21	0	14	
10	Aguacateros CDU	14	3	2	9	14	31	−17	1	12	
11	Sporting Canamy	14	3	1	10	18	36	−18	0	10	
12	Petroleros de Salamanca	14	2	0	12	10	35	−25	0	6	

Updated to match(es) played on 12 April 2025. Source: Liga Premier FMF
(C) Champions

==== Positions by round ====
Leader and qualification to Liguilla quarter-finals
Qualification to quarter-finals
Possible qualification to quarter-finals
Last place in table

Team ╲ Round	1	2	3	4	5	6	7	8	9	10	11	12	13	14
Aguacateros de Peribán	1	1	4	3	2	2	2	1	1	1	1	1	1	1
Irapuato	11	5	3	5	4	5	5	3	3	3	3	3	3	2
Halcones	3	6	1	2	1	1	1	2	2	2	2	2	2	3
La Piedad	7	10	10	10	9	7	6	5	5	5	4	4	4	4
Gavilanes de Matamoros	6	4	2	1	5	4	3	6	4	4	5	5	5	5
Zacatepec	12	8	5	4	3	3	4	4	6	6	6	6	6	6
Lobos ULMX	2	2	7	7	6	6	7	7	7	8	8	8	7	7
UAT	4	3	8	9	10	10	8	10	9	7	7	7	8	8
Colima	5	9	6	8	8	9	10	9	8	9	9	9	9	9
Aguacateros CDU	9	11	11	11	11	12	12	12	12	12	12	12	11	10
Sporting Canamy	8	7	9	6	7	8	9	8	10	10	10	10	10	11
Petroleros de Salamanca	10	12	12	12	12	11	11	11	11	11	11	11	12	12

Updated to match(es) played on 12 April 2025. Source: Liga Premier FMF

==== Results ====
Home \ Away	ADU	APB	COL	GAV	HAL	IRA	LPD	LUM	SAL	SCA	UAT	ZAC
Aguacateros CDU	—	1–1	2–0	—	0–2	—	2–3	1–3	—	—	—	—
Aguacateros de Peribán	—	—	—	3–0	1–1	3–0	1–1	—	—	7–1	1–0	—
Colima	—	0–4	—	—	0–3	—	2–1	1–0	—	2–1	1–2	—
Gavilanes de Matamoros	2–2	—	6–1	—	—	—	—	2–2	2–0	2–1	—	4–0
Halcones	—	—	—	1–0	—	0–2	1–0	—	—	—	1–0	4–0
Irapuato	4–0	—	6–0	3–1	—	—	—	—	3–0	3–2	—	2–1
La Piedad	—	—	—	2–2	—	1–0	—	—	2–1	—	2–0	0–1
Lobos ULMX	—	2–1	—	—	0–2	1–1	0–6	—	—	2–1	0–0	—
Petroleros de Salamanca	2–0	1–4	0–1	—	1–3	—	—	1–0	—	—	—	—
Sporting Canamy	1–0	—	—	—	3–1	—	1–3	—	5–1	—	—	1–3
UAT	3–0	—	—	2–3	—	3–0	—	—	1–0	4–0	—	1–2
Zacatepec	4–0	1–2	2–0	—	—	—	—	1–2	3–1	—	—	—

Updated to match(es) played on 24 March 2025. Source: Liga Premier FMF
Legend: Blue = home team win; Yellow = draw; Red = away team win.

=== Group 3 ===
==== Standings ====
Pos	Team	Pld	W	D	L	GF	GA	GD	BP	Pts	Qualification or relegation
1	Racing de Veracruz	14	8	4	2	22	9	+13	2	30	Qualification to Liguilla de Ascenso
2	Deportiva Venados	14	8	2	4	29	11	+18	1	27	Qualification to Liguilla de Ascenso
3	Chilpancingo	14	8	2	4	22	23	−1	1	27	
4	Montañeses	14	7	3	4	23	13	+10	1	25	
5	Faraones de Texcoco	14	7	2	5	17	12	+5	1	24	
6	Jaguares	14	6	3	5	28	17	+11	1	22	
7	Pioneros de Cancún	14	6	2	6	20	17	+3	2	22	
8	Tapachula Soconusco	14	5	5	4	24	24	0	1	21	
9	Inter Playa del Carmen	14	5	3	6	17	20	−3	3	21	
10	Zitácuaro	14	3	4	7	16	24	−8	1	14	
11	Acatlán	14	3	3	8	23	37	−14	2	14	
12	Atlético Aragón	14	1	1	12	13	46	−33	0	4	

Updated to match(es) played on 12 April 2025. Source: Liga Premier FMF

==== Positions by round ====
Leader and qualification to Liguilla quarter-finals
Qualification to quarter-finals
Possible qualification to quarter-finals
Last place in table

Team ╲ Round	1	2	3	4	5	6	7	8	9	10	11	12	13	14
Racing de Veracruz	4	2	7	7	6	5	6	5	4	3	3	1	1	1
Deportiva Venados	7	3	1	1	1	1	1	1	1	1	1	4	3	2
Chilpancingo	2	10	6	4	2	3	5	4	6	6	7	7	4	3
Montañeses	1	1	2	2	4	4	7	6	7	5	5	2	2	4
Faraones de Texcoco	5	6	5	6	5	2	2	3	3	2	4	5	7	5
Jaguares	8	4	3	3	3	6	3	2	2	4	2	3	6	6
Pioneros de Cancún	9	5	4	5	7	8	10	10	9	9	9	9	5	7
Tapachula Soconusco	10	9	10	8	8	7	4	7	5	7	6	8	9	8
Inter Playa del Carmen	6	7	9	11	9	10	8	8	8	8	8	6	8	9
Zitácuaro	11	11	12	9	10	9	9	11	10	11	10	11	11	10
Acatlán	12	12	8	10	11	11	11	9	11	10	11	10	10	11
Atlético Aragón	3	8	11	12	12	12	12	12	12	12	12	12	12	12

Updated to match(es) played on 12 April 2025. Source: Liga Premier FMF

==== Results ====
Home \ Away	ACA	ARA	CHI	DVE	FAR	INP	JAG	MON	PIO	RVE	TAP	ZIT
Acatlán	—	—	1–2	—	1–3	—	—	0–4	—	—	2–0	3–1
Atlético Aragón	1–6	—	—	—	—	1–3	3–1	—	2–2	0–5	—	—
Chilpancingo	—	3–2	—	—	2–0	—	—	2–1	—		2–2	3–0
Deportiva Venados	7–0	3–0	4–0	—	—	—	—	0–0	—	0–1	—	—
Faraones de Texcoco	—	3–0	—	2–0	—	—	—	2–0	—	0–0	2–0	1–0
Inter Playa del Carmen	3–3	—	2–0	1–0	1–0	—	0–0	—	0–1	—	—	—
Jaguares	4–1	—	6–1	0–0	2–0	—	—	—	—	—	2–3	5–1
Montañeses	—	3–0	—	—	—	1–1	1–0	—	3–1	3–1	—	—
Pioneros de Cancún	3–1	—	3–0	1–2	2–0	—	0–2	—	—	—	0–0	—
Racing de Veracruz	2–1	—	1–1	—	—	3–0	2–3	—	3–1	—	—	—
Tapachula Soconusco	—	4–1	—	1–3	—	2–1	—	3–2	—	0–0	—	2–1
Zitácuaro	—	3–0	—	1–2	—	1–0	—	1–1	2–0	0–0	—	—

Updated to match(es) played on 22 March 2025. Source: Liga Premier FMF
Legend: Blue = home team win; Yellow = draw; Red = away team win.

=== Inter–group weeks ===
Starting this season, the Liga Premier FMF has introduced three additional weeks of games between teams from different groups, which will take place in weeks 12, 13 and 14 of the calendar. The league has established that the teams will be divided into nine subgroups, and these points will be added to the normal tables of their respective groups, although with separate results.

==== Week 1 ====
- UAT 0 – 0 Alacranes de Durango
- Atlético Aragón 0 – 4 Tigres de Álica
- Tecos 0 – 1 La Piedad
- Cimarrones de Sonora 3 – 0 Aguacateros CDU
- Faraones de Texcoco 1 – 1 Tritones Vallarta
- Halcones (3) 3 – 3 (4) Tapachula Soconusco
- Mexicali 1 – 2 Aguacateros de Peribán
- Zacatepec 0 – 1 Chilpancingo
- Petroleros de Salamanca 2 – 4 Inter Playa del Carmen
- Colima 0 – 0 Los Cabos United
- Agricultores F.C. 4 – 2 Zitácuaro
- Sporting Canamy 0 – 4 Pioneros de Cancún
- Irapuato 3 – 1 Deportiva Venados
- Racing de Veracruz 1 – 0 Mineros de Fresnillo
- Montañeses 2 – 0 Tuzos UAZ
- Acatlán (5) 2 – 2 (4) Leones Negros
- Real Apodaca (4) 2 – 2 (2) Gavilanes de Matamoros
- Lobos ULMX 2 – 1 Jaguares

==== Week 2 ====
- UAT 0 – 1 Real Apodaca
- Inter Playa del Carmen 0 – 3 Irapuato
- Alacranes de Durango 3 – 1 Gavilanes de Matamoros
- Leones Negros 2 – 0 Colima
- Chilpancingo 3 – 0 Sporting Canamy
- Aguacateros CDU 2 – 1 Mexicali
- Deportiva Venados 4 – 0 Petroleros de Salamanaca
- Pioneros de Cancún 1 – 0 Zacatepec
- Aguacateros de Peribán 2 – 0 Cimarrones de Sonora
- Tigres de Álica 1 – 0 Faraones de Texcoco
- Tritones Vallarta 3 – 1 Atlético Aragón
- Zitácuaro 1 – 1 Tecos
- Tuzos UAZ 0 – 2 Racing de Veracruz
- Lobos ULMX 4 – 3 Tapachula Soconusco
- Jaguares 1 – 2 Halcones
- La Piedad 2 – 3 Agricultores F.C.
- Los Cabos United 5 – 2 Acatlán
- Mineros de Fresnillo 1 – 2 Montañeses

==== Week 3 ====
- Atlético Aragón 2 – 3 Faraones de Texcoco
- Tecos 3 – 1 Agricultores F.C.
- Cimarrones de Sonora 4 – 0 Mexicali
- Halcones 0 – 0 Lobos ULMX
- Leones Negros 1 – 2 Los Cabos United
- Chilpancingo 2 – 1 Pioneros de Cancún
- Zacatepec 1 – 1 Sporting Canamy
- Deportiva Venados 3 – 1 Inter Playa del Carmen
- Petroleros de Salamanca 0 – 3 Irapuato
- Aguacateros de Peribán 2 – 4 Aguacateros CDU
- Tigres de Álica 2 – 1 Tritones Vallarta
- Colima 0 – 0 Acatlán
- Mineros de Fresnillo 0 – 2 Tuzos UAZ
- Tapachula Soconusco 1 – 1 Jaguares
- La Piedad (3) 2 – 2 (4) Zitácuaro
- Racing de Veracruz 1 – 0 Montañeses
- Gavilanes de Matamoros 1 – 1 UAT
- Real Apodaca 1 – 2 Alacranes de Durango

=== Regular season statistics ===
==== Top goalscorers ====
Players sorted first by goals scored, then by last name.

Rank	Player	Club	Goals
1	(Mexico) David García	Aguacateros de Peribán	18
2	(Colombia) Klinsman Calderón	Jaguares	12
2	(Mexico) Francisco Castañeda	Gavilanes de Matamoros	12
2	(Colombia) Luis Mosquera	Los Cabos United	12
2	(Mexico) Edgar Verduzco	Agricultores F.C.	12
6	(Mexico) Iván Hernández	Irapuato	11
7	(Mexico) Adolfo Hernández	Racing de Veracruz	10
8	(Mexico) César Landa	Montañeses	8
8	(Ecuador) Santiago Micolta	Deportiva Venados	8
8	(Mexico) Moisés Villatoro	Tapachula Soconusco	8

Source:Liga Premier FMF

==== Hat-tricks ====
Player	For	Against	Result	Date	Round	Reference
(Mexico) David García	Aguacateros de Peribán	Petroleros de Salamanca	1 – 4 (A)	11 January 2025	1	
(Ecuador) Santiago Micolta	Deportiva Venados	Acatlán	7 – 0 (H)	18 January 2025	2	
(Colombia) Klinsman Calderón	Jaguares	Chilpancingo	6 – 1 (H)	18 January 2025	3	
(Mexico) Guillermo García	Acatlán	Atlético Aragón	1 – 6 (A)	24 January 2025	3	
(Colombia) Klinsman Calderón	Jaguares	Racing de Veracruz	2 – 3 (A)	25 January 2025	2	
(Argentina) Juan Echezarreta	Chilpancingo	Atlético Aragón	3 – 2 (H)	8 February 2025	5	
(Mexico) Edwin Orrantia	Jaguares	Zitácuaro	5 – 1 (H)	1 March 2025	8	
(Mexico) David García	Aguacateros de Peribán	Sporting Canamy	7 – 1 (H)	8 March 2025	9	
(Mexico) Denilson Villa	Tuzos UAZ	Mexicali	2 – 4 (A)	26 March 2025	8	
(Mexico) Miguel Guzmán	Inter Playa del Carmen	Petroleros de Salamanca	2 – 4 (A)	29 March 2025	12	
(Mexico) Edgar Verduzco	Agricultores F.C.	Zitácuaro	4 – 2 (H)	29 March 2025	12	
(Mexico) Yaro Martínez	Mineros de Fresnillo	Tuzos UAZ	2 – 6 (A)	2 April 2025	9	
(Colombia) Luis Mosquera	Los Cabos United	Acatlán	5 – 2 (H)	5 April 2025	13	

(H) – Home; (A) – Away

=== Attendance ===
==== Per team ====
Pos	Team	Total	High	Low	Average	Change
1	Jaguares	62,204	10,000	7,945	8,886	−10.3%
2	Faraones de Texcoco	38,600	8,000	3,000	5,514	+79.6%
3	Irapuato	28,800	8,000	2,800	4,114	−27.5%
4	Tapachula Soconusco	24,975	5,300	1,500	3,568	−31.5%
5	Gavilanes de Matamoros	20,020	4,520	1,000	2,860	−11.6%
6	Montañeses	12,500	3,500	1,500	2,083	+35.4%
7	Inter Playa del Carmen	14,050	3,500	600	2,007	+165.1%
8	Racing de Veracruz	9,100	1,500	1,000	1,300	+22.2%
9	La Piedad	7,650	3,000	250	1,093	+65.6%
10	Deportiva Venados	7,000	2,300	200	1,000	+137.5%
11	Alacranes de Durango	4,600	1,000	500	767	−37.7%
12	Pioneros de Cancún	4,830	1,100	400	690	+18.8%
13	Zitácuaro	4,400	2,500	100	629	−12.2%
14	Chilpancingo	4,200	1,000	200	600	+7.7%
15	Aguacateros de Peribán	2,900	750	200	483	0.0%^{2}
17	Aguacateros CDU	2,300	800	150	383	−19.4%
16	Petroleros de Salamanca	2,120	800	20	353	−52.7%^{1}
18	Agricultores F.C.	2,150	700	50	307	−17.3%^{4}
19	Lobos ULMX	2,430	1,000	100	304	+82.0%
20	Los Cabos United	1,800	500	200	300	+9.1%
21	Zacatepec	1,650	300	200	236	−54.7%^{3}
22	Acatlán	1,300	300	200	217	−24.7%
23	Cimarrones de Sonora	1,693	323	120	212	−34.0%
24	Tigres de Álica	1,350	300	100	169	−77.5%
25	Real Apodaca	1,350	300	100	169	−18.7%
26	Tuzos UAZ	1,020	200	100	146	+4.3%^{1}
27	Halcones	990	500	60	141	+45.4%^{1}
28	Tecos	1,100	300	100	138	−46.5%
30	Tritones Vallarta	800	200	100	133	−43.6%
29	Colima	970	150	20	121	−23.4%
31	Atlético Aragón	850	250	50	121	−29.2%
32	UAT	850	200	50	106	−39.4%
33	Mineros de Fresnillo	700	200	50	100	−26.5%
34	Leones Negros	600	100	50	86	−23.2%
35	Sporting Canamy	400	100	50	67	−59.6%^{1}
36	Mexicali	250	50	50	50	−45.1%
	League total	272,602	10,000	20	1,099	−4.8%

Source: Liga Premier FMF
Notes:
Only regular season listed
1: The team played at least one match on an alternative field
2: The team played at least one match behind closed doors
3: Zacatepec played last tournament at Zacatepec, Morelos.
4: Agricultores played last tournament at Guasave, Sinaloa.

==== Highest and lowest ====
Highest attended					Lowest attended			
Week	Home	Score	Away	Attendance	Home	Score	Away	Attendance
1	Inter Playa	1–0	Deportiva Venados	3,500	Atlético Aragón	3–1	Jaguares	50
2	Jaguares	6–1	Chilpancingo	9,800	Zitácuaro	0–0	Racing de Veracruz	100
3	Faraones de Texcoco	1–0	Zitácuaro	3,500	Mineros de Fresnillo	2–0	Tritones Vallarta	50
4	Jaguares	2–0	Faraones de Texcoco	9,400	Sporting Canamy	5–1	Petroleros de Salamanca	50
5	Faraones de Texcoco	2–0	Montañeses	7,000	Mexicali	0–1	Alacranes de Durango	50
6	Jaguares	2–3	Tapachula Soconusco	8,725	Leones Negros	2–1	Tuzos UAZ	50
7	Irapuato	2–1	Zacatepec	5,000	Mineros de Fresnillo	2–1	Mexicali	50
8	Jaguares	5–1	Zitácuaro	7,945	Sporting Canamy	1–0	Aguacateros CDU	50
9	Jaguares	0–0	Deportiva Venados	10,000	Tigres de Álica	2–0	Agricultores F.C.	100
10	Faraones de Texcoco	2–0	Deportiva Venados	7,000	Halcones	1–0	Gavilanes de Matamoros	50
11	Jaguares	4–1	Acatlán	7,634	Tecos	1–1	Tuzos UAZ	100
12	Faraones de Texcoco	1–1	Tritones Vallarta	7,100	Agricultores F.C.	4–2	Zitácuaro	50
13	Jaguares	1–2	Halcones	8,700	Leones Negros	2–0	Colima	50
14	Tapachula Soconusco	1–1	Jaguares	5,000	Petroleros de Salamanca	0–3	Irapuato	20

Source: Liga Premier FMF

1. Does not include matches played behind closed doors.

=== Liguilla ===
==== Liguilla de Ascenso ====
The two best teams and the two best third places of each group play two games against each other on a home-and-away basis. The higher seeded teams play on their home field during the second leg. The winner of each match up is determined by aggregate score. In the quarterfinals and semifinals, if the two teams are tied on aggregate the higher seeded team advances. In the final, if the two teams are tied after both legs, the match goes to extra time and, if necessary, a penalty shoot-out.

Quarter-finals
1	Aguacateros de Peribán	1	4	5
9	Deportiva Venados	1	1	2
3	Halcones	0	2	2
6	Real Apodaca	2	1	3
2	Irapuato (s)	2	1	3
7	Alacranes de Durango	2	1	3
4	Cimarrones de Sonora	0	5	5
5	Racing de Veracruz	3	1	4

Semi-finals
1	Aguacateros de Peribán	0	2	2
6	Real Apodaca	1	0	1
2	Irapuato (s)	1	1	2
4	Cimarrones de Sonora	1	1	2

Final
1	Aguacateros de Peribán	0	0	0
2	Irapuato	2	0	2

===== Quarter–finals =====
The first legs were played on 19 and 20 April, and the second legs were played on 26 April 2025.

Team 1	Agg.	Team 2	1st leg	2nd leg
Aguacateros de Peribán	5–2	Deportiva Venados	1–1	4–1
Irapuato (s)	3–3	Alacranes de Durango	2–2	1–1
Halcones	2–3	Real Apodaca	0–2	2–1
Cimarrones de Sonora	5–4	Racing de Veracruz	0–3	5–1

Matches

20 April 2025
10:30 CST (UTC−6)

Deportiva Venados	1–1	Aguacateros de Peribán
Rodríguez 31'	Report	Arredondo 90+4'

Estadio Alonso Diego Molina, Tamanché
Attendance: 500
Referee: Yoel Guzmán Hernández
26 April 2025
16:00 CST (UTC−6)

Aguacateros de Peribán	4–1	Deportiva Venados
Cerda 8'; García 55', 79', 85'	Report	Hernández 90+5'

Estadio Municipal, Peribán
Attendance: 700
Referee: Yair Ugalde Rivera

Aguacateros de Peribán won 5–2 on aggregate.

19 April 2025
19:00 CST (UTC−6)

Alacranes de Durango	2–2	Irapuato
Hinojosa 49', 59'	Report	Pucheta 13'; Rangel 26'

Estadio Francisco Zarco, Durango City
Attendance: 3,500
Referee: Edwin Eduardo Morfín Verduzco
26 April 2025
19:00 CST (UTC−6)

Irapuato	1–1	Alacranes de Durango
Rangel 43'	Report	Parra 73'

Estadio Sergio León Chávez, Irapuato
Attendance: 15,000
Referee: Brian Jair Jiménez Morales

3–3 on aggregate. Irapuato advanced due to being the higher seeded team.

20 April 2025
16:00 CST (UTC−6)

Real Apodaca	2–0	Halcones
Leal 75'; Reis 77'	Report

Unidad Deportiva Centenario del Ejército, Apodaca
Attendance: 300
Referee: Ignacio Góngora García
26 April 2025
16:00 CST (UTC−6)

Halcones	2–1	Real Apodaca
Salas 17'; Frausto 84'	Report	Camacho 24'

Estadio Corregidora, Querétaro
Attendance: 368
Referee: Fernando Alexis Portillo Botello

Real Apodaca won 2–3 on aggregate.

19 April 2025
19:00 CST (UTC−6)

Racing de Veracruz	3–0	Cimarrones de Sonora
Hernández 10', 21'; Sánchez 63'	Report

Unidad Deportiva Hugo Sánchez, Boca del Río
Attendance: 3,500
Referee: Maximiliano Arias Guzmán
26 April 2025
19:00 MST (UTC−7)

Cimarrones de Sonora	5–1	Racing de Veracruz
Payares 13'; Talavera 22'; Solórzano 73', 78', 88'	Report	Sánchez 90+2'

Estadio Héroe de Nacozari, Hermosillo
Attendance: 350
Referee: Iván Alberto Salazar Hernández

Cimarrones de Sonora won 5–4 on aggregate.

===== Semi–finals =====
The first legs were played on 30 April 2025, and the second legs were played on 3 May 2025.

Team 1	Agg.	Team 2	1st leg	2nd leg
Aguacateros de Peribán	2–1	Real Apodaca	0–1	2–0
Irapuato (s)	2–2	Cimarrones de Sonora	1–1	1–1

Matches

30 April 2025
16:00 CST (UTC−6)

Real Apodaca	1–0	Aguacateros de Peribán
Ramírez 81'	Report

Estadio Olímpico Francisco I. Madero, Saltillo
Attendance: 150
Referee: Yoel Guzmán Hernández
3 May 2025
16:00 CST (UTC−6)

Aguacateros de Peribán	2–0	Real Apodaca
Cerda 42'; Barajas 49'	Report

Estadio Municipal, Peribán
Attendance: 833
Referee: Brian Jair Jiménez Morales

Aguacateros de Peribán won 2–1 on aggregate.

30 April 2025
19:00 MST (UTC−7)

Cimarrones de Sonora	1–1	Irapuato
Talavera 19'	Report	Pucheta 44'

Estadio Héroe de Nacozari, Hermosillo
Attendance: 350
Referee: Ignacio Góngora García
3 May 2025
19:00 CST (UTC−6)

Irapuato	1–1	Cimarrones de Sonora
Ruiz 63'	Report	Ascencio 69'

Estadio Sergio León Chávez, Irapuato
Attendance: 12,000
Referee: Fernando Alexis Portillo Botello

2–2 on aggregate. Irapuato advanced due to being the higher seeded team.

===== Final =====
The first legs was played on 7 May 2025, and the second leg was played on 10 May 2025.

Team 1	Agg.	Team 2	1st leg	2nd leg
Aguacateros de Peribán	0-2	Irapuato	0–2	0–0

Matches

7 May 2025
19:00 CST (UTC−6)

Irapuato	2–0	Aguacateros de Peribán
I. Hernández 44', 83'	Report

Estadio Sergio León Chávez, Irapuato
Attendance: 23,000
Referee: Edwin Eduardo Morfín Verduzco
10 May 2025
16:00 CST (UTC−6)

Aguacateros de Peribán	0–0	Irapuato
	Report

Estadio Ignacio López Rayón, Zitácuaro
Attendance: 1,000
Referee: Iván Alberto Salazar Hernández

Irapuato won 0–2 on aggregate.

==== Liguilla de Filiales ====
The four best reserve teams of the season play two games against each other on a home-and-away basis. The higher seeded teams play on their home field during the second leg. The winner of each match up is determined by aggregate score. In the semifinals, if the two teams are tied on aggregate the higher seeded team advances. In the final, if the two teams are tied after both legs, the match goes to extra time and, if necessary, a penalty shoot-out.

Semi–finals
1	Leones Negros	5	1	6
4	Mineros de Fresnillo	1	2	3
2	Lobos ULMX	0	1	2
3	UAT	0	2	2

Final
1	Leones Negros	0	1	1
3	UAT	2	0	2

===== Semi–finals =====
The first legs were played on 18 and 19 April, and the second legs were played on 26 and 27 April 2025.

Team 1	Agg.	Team 2	1st leg	2nd leg
Leones Negros	6–3	Mineros de Fresnillo	5–1	1–2
Lobos ULMX	1–2	UAT	0–0	1–2

Matches

19 April 2025
11:00 CST (UTC−6)

Mineros de Fresnillo	1–5	Leones Negros
Mata 45'	Report	Hernández 1', 24'; Herrera 52'; Navarro 76'; Valdivia 81'

Unidad Deportiva Minera Fresnillo, Fresnillo
Attendance: 100
Referee: Marco Claudio Rodríguez Deras
26 April 2025
11:00 CST (UTC−6)

Leones Negros	1–2	Mineros de Fresnillo
Madrigal 32'	Report	Martínez 64'; Rodríguez 67'

Club Deportivo La Primavera, Zapopan
Attendance: 100
Referee: Mauricio Rodríguez Martínez

Leones Negros won 6–3 on aggregate.

18 April 2025
10:00 CST (UTC−6)

UAT	0–0	Lobos ULMX
	Report

Estadio Profesor Eugenio Alvizo Porras, Ciudad Victoria
Attendance: 200
Referee: Carlos Zohet Martínez Vega
27 April 2025
19:00 CST (UTC−6)

Lobos ULMX	1–2	UAT
Jasso 79'	Report	Barrón 23'; López 49'

Estadio Miguel Alemán Valdés, Celaya
Attendance: 1,100
Referee: Oscar Yair Toledo Pineda

UAT won 1–2 on aggregate.

===== Final =====
The first leg was played on 1 May, and the second leg was played on 4 May 2025.

Team 1	Agg.	Team 2	1st leg	2nd leg
Leones Negros	1–2	UAT	0–2	1–0

Matches

1 May 2025
10:00 CST (UTC−6)

UAT	2–0	Leones Negros
Treviño 36', 69'	Report

Estadio Profesor Eugenio Alvizo Porras, Ciudad Victoria
Attendance: 1,500
Referee: Marco Claudio Rodríguez Deras
4 May 2025
15:00 CST (UTC−6)

Leones Negros	1–0	UAT
Sepúlveda 36'	Report

Club Deportivo La Primavera, Zapopan
Attendance: 500
Referee: Oscar Yair Toledo Pineda

UAT won 1–2 on aggregate.

== Coefficient table ==
P	Team	Pts	G	Pts/G	GD
1	Aguacateros de Peribán	72	28	2.571	+46
2	Irapuato	67	28	2.393	+30
3	Cimarrones de Sonora	62	28	2.214	+31
4	Gavilanes de Matamoros	54	28	1.929	+19
5	Alacranes de Durango	55	28	1.964	+19
6	Real Apodaca	54	28	1.929	+5
7	La Piedad	53	28	1.893	+23
8	Tuzos UAZ	51	28	1.821	+4
9	Tigres de Álica	49	28	1.750	+11
10	Pioneros de Cancún	48	28	1.714	+12
11	Faraones de Texcoco	48	28	1.714	+10
12	Leones Negros UdeG	48	28	1.714	+8
13	Racing de Veracruz	47	28	1.679	+10
14	Inter Playa del Carmen	47	28	1.679	+3
15	Jaguares	46	28	1.643	+16
16	Montañeses	46	28	1.643	+11
17	Deportiva Venados	45	28	1.607	+15
18	Halcones	45	28	1.607	+5
19	Tecos	45	28	1.607	+6
20	Tritones Vallarta	44	28	1.571	+2
21	Zacatepec	41	28	1.464	+1
22	Los Cabos United	41	28	1.464	–4
23	Petroleros de Salamanca	40	28	1.429	–9
24	Chilpancingo	39	28	1.393	–11
25	Tapachula Soconusco	36	28	1.286	–1
26	Agricultores de Guasave	36	28	1.286	–7
27	Acatlán	36	28	1.286	–16
28	Aguacateros CDU	36	28	1.286	–18
29	Zitácuaro	31	28	1.107	–13
30	Lobos ULMX	31	28	1.107	–14
31	UAT	29	28	1.036	–13
32	Mineros de Fresnillo	26	28	0.929	–7
33	Sporting Canamy	22	28	0.786	–24
34	Colima	17	28	0.607	–44
35	Atlético Aragón	10	28	0.357	–68
36	Mexicali	6	28	0.214	–49

Last updated: April 13, 2025
Source: Liga Premier FMF
P = Position; G = Games played; Pts = Points; Pts/G = Ratio of points to games played; GD = Goal difference

== Campeón de Campeones de Ascenso Final ==
The Campeón de Campeones de Ascenso Final are a two-legged super cup matches between the champions of the Apertura and Clausura tournaments, to determine the winning team of the promotion to Liga de Expansión MX, as long as the winning team meets the league requirements.

The first leg was played on 15 May, and the second leg was played on 18 May 2025.

Team 1	Agg.	Team 2	1st leg	2nd leg
Aguacateros de Peribán (p)	1–1 (5–3)	Irapuato	1–1	1–1

First leg

15 May 2025
19:00 CST (UTC−6)

Irapuato	1–1	Aguacateros de Peribán
Hernández 6'	Report	García 19'

Estadio Sergio León Chávez, Irapuato
Attendance: 15,300
Referee: Yoel Guzmán Hernández

Irapuato	Aguacateros de Peribán

1	GK	(Mexico) Gerardo Magaña	(yellow card) 90'
2	DF	(Mexico) Jorge Gaytán
14	DF	(Mexico) Luis Galicia
20	DF	(Mexico) Manlio Rivera		(substituted off) 89'
7	MF	(Mexico) Jayson Sosa		(substituted off) 54'
19	MF	(Mexico) César Santana		(substituted off) 54'
22	MF	(Mexico) Diego Magaña		(substituted off) 89'
35	MF	(Mexico) Jassiel Ruiz
36	MF	(Mexico) Alan Pérez
15	FW	(Argentina) Juan Román Pucheta	(yellow card) 29'
32	FW	(Mexico) Iván Hernández		(substituted off) 85'
Substitutions:
25	GK	(Mexico) Joshua Reyes
5	DF	(Mexico) Víctor Reyes	(yellow card) 90'	(substituted on) 89'
23	DF	(Mexico) Edgar Hernández
26	DF	(Mexico) Rafael Ortiz
10	MF	(Mexico) Edwin Cerna		(substituted on) 54'
17	MF	(Chile) Ignacio Morales		(substituted on) 89'
18	MF	(Mexico) Jair Díaz
21	MF	(Mexico) Jesús Jiménez		(substituted on) 85'
9	FW	(Mexico) Álvaro Vidales		(substituted on) 54'
11	FW	(Mexico) Jorge Lumbreras
Manager:
(Mexico) Víctor Medina

1	GK	(Mexico) Jaime Patiño	(yellow card) 72'
3	DF	(Mexico) Antonio Martínez
4	DF	(Mexico) Jair Cerda
5	DF	(Mexico) Daniel Barajas	(yellow card) 36'
19	DF	(Mexico) Oscar Arredondo		(substituted off) 71'
6	MF	(Mexico) Héctor González	(yellow card) 67'
8	MF	(Mexico) Alejandro Zamora	(yellow card) 75' (yellow-red card) 90'
10	MF	(Mexico) Joel Gómez		(substituted off) 61'
11	MF	(Mexico) Jocsan Landa		(substituted off) 83'
14	MF	(Mexico) Edson Padilla
9	FW	(Mexico) David García	(yellow card) 44'	(substituted off) 83'
Substitutions:
32	GK	(Mexico) Stellan Sakamoto
2	DF	(Mexico) Sebastián Madrid		(substituted on) 71'
13	DF	(Mexico) Alberto Rodríguez
7	MF	(Mexico) Jovanni Huerta
17	MF	(Mexico) Fermín Pérez
18	MF	(Mexico) Fernando Vázquez		(substituted on) 83'
20	MF	(Mexico) Prince Rodríguez		(substituted on) 83'
27	MF	(Mexico) Cristóbal Méndez		(substituted on) 61'
30	FW	(Mexico) Nicolás Arze
Manager:
(Mexico) Marco Angúlo

Second leg

18 May 2025
15:00 CST (UTC−6)

Aguacateros de Peribán	1–1	Irapuato
García 86'	Report	Galicia 90'
Penalties
García (penalty scored); Martínez (penalty scored); Rodríguez (penalty scored); Arredondo (penalty scored); Huerta (penalty scored)	5–3	Ruiz (penalty scored); Pucheta (penalty scored); Cerna (penalty scored); Santana (penalty missed)

Estadio Venustiano Carranza, Morelia
Attendance: 4,000
Referee: Fernando Alexis Portillo Botello

Aguacateros de Peribán	Irapuato

1	GK	(Mexico) Jaime Patiño
2	DF	(Mexico) Sebastián Madrid
3	DF	(Mexico) Antonio Martínez
4	DF	(Mexico) Jair Cerda	(red card) 90'
5	DF	(Mexico) Daniel Barajas
19	DF	(Mexico) Oscar Arredondo
10	MF	(Mexico) Joel Gómez		(substituted off) 89'
11	MF	(Mexico) Jocsan Landa	(yellow card) 87'	(substituted off) 105'
14	MF	(Mexico) Edson Padilla
27	MF	(Mexico) Cristóbal Méndez		(substituted off) 78'
9	FW	(Mexico) David García	(yellow card) 56'
Substitutions:
32	GK	(Mexico) Stellan Skamoto
13	DF	(Mexico) Alberto Rodríguez		(substituted on) 89'
21	DF	(Mexico) Pedro Ceja
28	DF	(Mexico) Luis Ortiz
7	MF	(Mexico) Jovanni Huerta		(substituted on) 78'
17	MF	(Mexico) Fermín Pérez
18	MF	(Mexico) Fernando Vázquez
20	MF	(Mexico) Prince Rodríguez		(substituted on) 105'
30	FW	(Mexico) Nicolás Arze
Manager: (Mexico) Marco Angúlo

1	GK	(Mexico) Gerardo Magaña
2	DF	(Mexico) Jorge Gaytán		(substituted off) 89'
5	DF	(Mexico) Víctor Reyes	(yellow card) 47'	(substituted off) 89'
14	DF	(Mexico) Luis Galicia
20	DF	(Mexico) Manlio Rivera		(substituted off) 73'
17	MF	(Chile) Ignacio Morales		(substituted off) 73'
22	MF	(Mexico) Diego Magaña
35	MF	(Mexico) Jassiel Ruiz	(yellow card) 25'
36	MF	(Mexico) Alan Pérez	(yellow card) 98'
15	FW	(Argentina) Juan Román Pucheta
32	FW	(Mexico) Iván Hernández		(substituted off) 57'
Substitutions:
25	GK	(Mexico) Joshua Reyes
23	DF	(Mexico) Edgar Hernández		(substituted on) 89'
26	DF	(Mexico) Rafael Ortiz
27	DF	(Mexico) Adolfo Reynaga
7	MF	(Mexico) Jayson Sosa
10	MF	(Mexico) Edwin Cerna		(substituted on) 73'
19	MF	(Mexico) César Santana		(substituted on) 57'
21	MF	(Mexico) Jesús Jiménez	(yellow card) 104'	(substituted on) 73'
9	FW	(Mexico) Álvaro Vidales
11	FW	(Mexico) Jorge Lumbreras		(substituted on) 89'
Manager: (Mexico) Víctor Medina

== Campéon de Campeones de Filiales Final ==
The Campeón de Campeones de Ascenso Final are a two-legged super cup matches between the champions of the Apertura and Clausura tournaments, to determine the winning team of an honorary trophy that will be awarded to the best reserves team of the season.

The first leg was played on 8 May, and the second leg was played on 11 May 2025.

Team 1	Agg.	Team 2	1st leg	2nd leg
Aguacateros CDU	2–3	UAT	0–1	2–2

Matches

8 May 2025	UAT	1–0	Aguacateros CDU	Ciudad Victoria
10:00 CST (UTC−6)	Estopier 61'	Report		Stadium: Estadio Profesor Eugenio Alvizo Porras; Attendance: 500; Referee: Mauricio Rodríguez Martínez

11 May 2025	Aguacateros CDU	2–2 (2-3 agg.)	UAT	Uruapan
15:00 CST (UTC−6)	Pahua 8'; Sandoval 76'	Report	Eguía 90'; Estopier 103'	Stadium: Unidad Deportiva Hermanos López Rayón; Attendance: 1,200; Referee: Carlos Zohet Martínez Vega

== See also ==
- 2024–25 Liga MX season
- 2024–25 Liga de Expansión MX season
- 2024–25 Serie B de México season
- 2024–25 Liga TDP season
- 2024 Copa Promesas MX
