= 2011–12 Club América season =

América
2011–12 season
- Chairman: Michel Bauer; Ricardo Peláez
- Manager: Carlos Reinoso (Feb., 2011–Sep., 2011); Alfredo Tena (Sep., 2011–Nov., 2011); Miguel Herrera (from Nov., 2011)
- Stadium: Estadio Azteca
- Apertura 2011: 17th
- Clausura 2012: 3rd Final Phase Semi-finals
- Top goalscorer: League: Apertura: Christian Benítez (8) Clausura: Christian Benítez (14); All: Christian Benítez (22)
Home colours	Away colours

The 2011–12 América season was the 65th professional season of Mexico's top-flight football league. The season is split into two tournaments—the Torneo Apertura and the Torneo Clausura—each with identical formats and each contested by the same eighteen teams. América began their season on July 25, 2011, against Querétaro, América play their homes games on Sundays at 4:00pm local time.

== Torneo Apertura ==
=== Squad ===
Note: Flags indicate national team as defined under FIFA eligibility rules; some limited exceptions apply. Players may hold more than one non-FIFA nationality.

No.	Pos.	Nation	Player
1	GK	MEX	Armando Navarrete
3	DF	COL	Aquivaldo Mosquera
4	DF	MEX	Óscar Rojas (vice-captain)
5	MF	MEX	Jesús Molina
6	DF	MEX	Juan Carlos Valenzuela
7	MF	BRA	Rosinei
8	FW	URU	Vicente Sánchez (captain)
10	MF	ARG	Daniel Montenegro
11	FW	ECU	Christian Benítez
12	GK	MEX	Hugo González
13	MF	MEX	Diego Reyes
15	DF	USA	Edgar Castillo
16	FW	MEX	Isaác Acuña
18	MF	MEX	Ángel Reyna
19	DF	MEX	Miguel Layún

No.	Pos.	Nation	Player
20	GK	MEX	Leonín Pineda
21	MF	MEX	Lugiani Gallardo
22	DF	MEX	Paul Aguilar
23	MF	MEX	José Joaquín Martínez
24	FW	MEX	Daniel Márquez
25	MF	MEX	Renato González
26	MF	MEX	Juan Carlos Medina
29	DF	MEX	Ademar Rodríguez
30	FW	ARG	Vicente Matías Vuoso
32	DF	MEX	Erik Pimentel
33	DF	MEX	Patricio Treviño
34	DF	MEX	George Corral
47	DF	MEX	Raúl Jiménez
55	DF	MEX	Jorge Reyes

=== Out on loan ===
No.	Pos.	Nation	Player
-	DF	MEX	Guillermo Cerda (at San Luis)
-	DF	MEX	Diego Cervantes (at Puebla)
-	MF	MEX	Lampros Kontogiannis (at Tigres UANL)
-	FW	MEX	Antonio López (at Puebla)

No.	Pos.	Nation	Player
-	MF	MEX	Israel Martínez (at Querétaro)
-	MF	ECU	Luis Saritama (at Deportivo Quito)
-	MF	URU	Tabaré Viudez (at Nacional)

=== Regular season ===
Win Draw Loss

==== Apertura 2011 results ====
July 24, 2011 Round 1	América	2 – 1	Querétaro	Estadio Azteca, Mexico City
16:00	Cortés 28' (o.g.); Benítez 43'; Pimantel (yellow card) 69'	Report	Vásquez (yellow card) 21'; Pineda (yellow card) 49'; Mondragón (yellow card) 63'; Bueno (yellow card) 71'; García Arias (yellow card) 79'; Niell 90+3'	Referee: Antony Zanjuampa

July 31, 2011 Round 2	Toluca	1 – 1	América	Estadio Nemesio Díez, Toluca
12:00	Alonso 2'; Sinha (yellow card) 4'; Dueñas (yellow card) 26' (yellow-red card) 28' de la Torre (yellow card) 30'	Report	Molina (yellow card) 3'; Vuoso 22'; Rosinei (yellow card) 55'; Medina (yellow card) 86'	Referee: Jorge Isaac Rojas

August 3, 2011 Round 3	América	1 – 2	Estudiantes Tecos	Estadio Azteca, Mexico City
17:00	Peréz 34' (o.g.); Vusoso (yellow card) 40'; Pimentel (yellow card) 68' (red card) 85'; Valenzuela (yellow card) 77'; Aguilar (red card) 89'	Report	Pinto (yellow card) 11'; Bovaglio (yellow card) 13'; Zamogilny 60'; Sambuez 70'	Referee: Miguel Ángel Flores

September 14, 2011 Round 4	América	2 – 2	San Luis	Estadio Azteca, Mexico City
20:30	Rosinei (yellow card) 5', (goal) 47'; Márquez (yellow card) 68', (goal) 80'; Reyna (yellow card) 75'	Report	Alcántar (yellow card) 1'; Torres (yellow card) 23'; Aguirre 31', 90'; González (yellow card) 47'; Matellán (yellow card) 78'; Sánchez (yellow card) 84'	Referee: Roberto García Orozco

August 13, 2011 Round 5	UANL	2 – 2	América	Estadio Universitario, San Nicolás
18:00	Molina (yellow card) 56'; Treviño 66' (o.g.); Navarrete (yellow card) 81'; Mancilla 84'; Morán (yellow card) 90+2'	Report	Benítez 17', (yellow card) 90+2'; R. González 89'	Referee: César Arturo Ramos

August 21, 2011 Round 6	América	5 – 2	Atlas	Estadio Azteca, Mexico City
16:00	Reyna 44'; Sánchez 53'; Molina (yellow card) 55'; Benítez 69', 77', 90+2'; Mosquera (yellow card) 82'	Report	Vidrio (yellow card) 7'; Welcome 10'; Lacerda (yellow card) 33'; Zamora (yellow card) 71'; Santos 81'	Referee: Erim Ramírez

August 27, 2011 Round 7	Pachuca	2 – 0	América	Estadio Hidalgo, Pachuca
19:00	Borja 15', 64', (yellow card) 15'; Cejas (yellow card) 38'; Torres (yellow card) 43'; Brambila (yellow card) 43'	Report	Molina (yellow card) 58'; Valenzuela (red card) 83'; Vuoso (yellow card) 86'	Referee: Paul Delgadillo

September 11, 2011 Round 8	América	0 – 1	Atlante	Estadio Azteca, Mexico City
16:00	Rosieni (yellow card) 5'; Oregón (yellow card) 20'; Molina (yellow card) 44' (yellow-red card) 45+1'	Report	Rojas (yellow card) 9'; Diego (yellow card) 14'; Luna (yellow card) 23'; Martínez 48'	Referee: Marco Antonio Rodríguez

September 17, 2011 Round 9	Chiapas	5 – 3	América	Estadio Victor Manuel Reyna, Tuxtla Gutierrez
17:00	Andrade 8', 57'; Valdéz 29'; Arizala 42'; M. Martínez (yellow card) 45'; Fuentes (yellow card) 84'; J. Martínez 87'	Report	Benítez 25'; Montenegro 46', 67'; Rojas (yellow card) 54'; R. González (yellow card) 86'	Referee: José Alfredo Peñaloza

September 25, 2011 Round 10	América	1 – 1	Tijuana	Estadio Azteca, Mexico City
16:00	Reyes (yellow card) 4'; Márquez (yellow card) 23'; Benítez 86'; Reyna (yellow card) 90+1'	Report	Yacuzzi 1', (yellow card) 58'; Sand (yellow card) 8'; Gandolfi (yellow card) 29'; Almazán (yellow card) 64'; Leandro (yellow card) 89'	Referee: Roberto García Orozco

October 1, 2011 Round 11	UNAM	1 – 0	América	Estadio Olímpico Universitario, Mexico City
16:00	Cabrera (yellow card) 31'; Fuentes 55'; Izazola (yellow card) 70'; M. Palacios (yellow card) 90+2'	Report	Aguilar (yellow card) 18'	Referee: Ricardo Arellano

October 9, 2011 Round 12	América	1 – 1	Morelia	Estadio Azteca, Mexico City
17:00	Valenzuela 84'	Report	Sabah 11'; Gastélum (yellow card) 18'; Cabrera (yellow card) 50' (yellow-red card) 90+1'; Noriega (yellow card) 80' (yellow-red card) 83'	Referee: Francisco Chacón

October 15, 2011 Round 13	Monterrey	0 – 3	América	Estadio Tecnológico, Monterrey
17:00	Mier (yellow card) 38'; Osorio (yellow card) 62'; Santana (yellow card) 90+5'	Report	Martínez (yellow card) 8', (goal) 41'; Treviño (yellow card) 55'; Montenegro (yellow card) 60'; Rojas 68'; Mosquera 75'	Referee: Fabricio Morales

October 23, 2011 Round 14	América	1 – 3	Guadalajara	Estadio Azteca, Mexico City
16:00	Benítez 13'; Rosinei (red card) 59'; Molina (yellow card) 64'; Mosquera (yellow card) 86'	Report	Gallardo 5'; Fabian 18'; Torres 19'	Referee: Fernando Guerrero

October 26, 2011 Round 15	Santos Laguna	1 – 1	América	Estadio Corona, Torreón
21:00	Quintero 3'; Hoyos (yellow card) 38'; Estrada (red card) 52'	Report	Montenegro 7'; Jiménez (yellow card) 25'; Rodróguez (yellow card) 36'; Molina (yellow card) 48'; Mosquera (yellow card) 65'; Sánchez (red card) 85'; Rojas (yellow card) 90'; Valenzuela (yellow card) 90+4'	Referee: Miguel Ángel Ayala

October 30, 2011 Round 16	América	2 – 3	Puebla	Estadio Azteca, Mexico City
16:00	Jiménez 2'; Benítez (yellow card) 34'; Reyes (yellow card) 80'; Molina (yellow card) 84'; Vuoso 87'	Report	Luis García (yellow card) 4', (goal) 41', 81'; Riascos 45'	Referee: Jorge Eduardo Gasso

November 5, 2011 Round 17	Cruz Azul	3 – 1	América	Estadio Azul, Mexico City
17:00	Villa 1', 75'; Torrado (yellow card) 36'; Pinto (yellow card) 58'; Orozco 62'; Ponce (yellow card) 79'	[www.mediotiempo.com/ficha.php?id_partido=35740 Report]	Rojas (yellow card) 38'; Valenzuela (yellow card) 43'; Montenegro (yellow card) 63', (goal) 80'; Pimentel (yellow card) 70'	Referee: Roberto García Orozco

América did not qualify to the Final Phase

=== Goalscorers ===
Position	Nation	Name	Goals scored
1.	(Ecuador)	Christian Benítez	8
2.	(Argentina)	Daniel Montenegro	4
3.	(Mexico)	Vicente Matías Vuoso	2
3.		Own Goals	2
5.	(Brazil)	Rosinei	1
5.	(Mexico)	Raúl Jiménez	1
5.	(Mexico)	Renato González	1
5.	(Mexico)	Daniel Márquez	1
5.	(Mexico)	José Joaquín Martínez	1
5.	(Colombia)	Aquivaldo Mosquera	1
5.	(Mexico)	Ángel Reyna	1
5.	(Mexico)	Óscar Rojas	1
5.	(Uruguay)	Vicente Sánchez	1
5.	(Mexico)	Juan Carlos Valenzuela	1
TOTAL			26

=== Results ===
==== Results summary ====
Overall								Home						Away					
Pld	W	D	L	GF	GA	GD	Pts	W	D	L	GF	GA	GD	W	D	L	GF	GA	GD
17	3	6	8	26	31	−5	15	2	3	4	15	16	−1	1	3	4	11	15	−4

Last updated: 5 November 2011.
Source: Apertura 2011 results

==== Results by round ====
Round	1	2	3	4	5	6	7	8	9	10	11	12	13	14	15	16	17
Ground	H	A	H	H	A	H	A	H	A	H	A	H	A	H	A	H	A
Result	W	D	L	D	D	W	L	L	L	D	L	D	W	L	D	L	L
Position	7	8	6	9	12	8	11	16	16	16	16	16	16	16	17	17	17

Updated to match(es) played on 5 November 2011. Source: Apertura 2011 results and mediotiempo.com
A = Away; H = Home; W = Win; D = Draw; L = Loss

== Transfers ==
=== In ===
#	Pos	Nat	Player	Age	From	Date	Notes
	GK	(Mexico)	Moisés Muñoz	31	Atlante	November 18, 2011	
	MF	(Mexico)	Christian Bermúdez	24	Atlante	November 26, 2011	
	MF	(Mexico)	José María Cárdenas	26	Santos Laguna	December 16, 2011	
	DF	(Venezuela)	Oswaldo Vizcarrondo	27	(Argentina) Olimpo	December 19, 2011	

=== Out ===
#	Pos	Nat	Player	Age	To	Date	Notes
1	GK	(Mexico)	Armando Navarrete	31	Atlante	November 26, 2011	
15	DF	(United States)	Edgar Castillo	25	Tijuana	November 27, 2011	
23	MF	(Mexico)	José Joaquín Martínez	24	Necaxa	December 17, 2011	
18	MF	(Mexico)	Ángel Reyna	27	Monterrey	December 21, 2011	Sacked

== Torneo Clausura ==
=== Squad ===
Note: Flags indicate national team as defined under FIFA eligibility rules; some limited exceptions apply. Players may hold more than one non-FIFA nationality.

No.	Pos.	Nation	Player
2	DF	VEN	Oswaldo Vizcarrondo
3	DF	COL	Aquivaldo Mosquera (vice-captain)
4	DF	MEX	Óscar Rojas
5	MF	MEX	Jesús Molina
6	DF	MEX	Juan Carlos Valenzuela
7	MF	BRA	Rosinei
10	MF	ARG	Daniel Montenegro (captain)
11	FW	ECU	Christian Benítez
12	GK	MEX	Hugo González
13	MF	MEX	Diego Reyes
16	MF	MEX	José María Cárdenas
18	MF	MEX	Christian Bermúdez
19	DF	MEX	Miguel Layún

No.	Pos.	Nation	Player
21	MF	MEX	Lugiani Gallardo
22	DF	MEX	Paul Aguilar
23	GK	MEX	Moisés Muñoz
24	FW	MEX	Daniel Márquez
25	MF	MEX	Renato González
26	MF	MEX	Juan Carlos Medina
29	DF	MEX	Ademar Rodríguez
30	FW	MEX	Vicente Matías Vuoso
32	DF	MEX	Erik Pimentel
33	DF	MEX	Patricio Treviño
34	MF	MEX	Michel García
47	DF	MEX	Raúl Jiménez
55	DF	MEX	Jorge Reyes

=== Regular season ===
==== Clausura 2012 results ====
January 7, 2012 Round 1	Querétaro	0 – 2	América	Estadio Corregidora, Querétaro
17:00		Report	Valenzuela (yellow card) 6'; Benítez 70'; Reyes (yellow card) 82'; Medina 90+2'	Referee: Jorge Antonio Pérez

January 15, 2012 Round 2	América	1 – 1	Toluca	Estadio Azteca, Mexico City
16:00	Reyes (yellow card) 77'; Vuoso 85' (pen.)	Report	Gamboa (yellow card) 23'; Alonsp 55', (yellow card) 83'; Romagnoli (yellow card) 76'; Talavera (yellow card) 90'	Referee: Erim Ramírez

January 20, 2012 Round 3	Estudiantes Tecos	1 – 1	América	Estadio Tres de Marzo, Zapopan
20:10	Sambueza (yellow card) 15'; Bareiro 39'; Luna (yellow card) 60'; Castro (yellow card) 75'; Colace (yellow card) 89'	Report	Benítez 47'; Adolfo (yellow card) 49'; Mosquera (yellow card) 71'; Vizcarrondo (yellow card) 72'	Referee: Mauricio Morales

January 28, 2012 Round 4	San Luis	1 – 3	América	Estadio Alfonso Lastras, San Luis Potosí
20:45	Aguirre 4'; Chiapas (yellow card) 19'; Chávez (yellow card) 33'; Paredes (yellow card) 38'; Orozco (yellow card) 55'; Alcántar (yellow card) 70'	Report	Benítez 9', 35' (pen.); Mosquera (yellow card) 22'; Rosinei 28'; Rojas (yellow card) 60'	Referee: Óscar Macias

February 5, 2012 Round 5	América	0 – 1	UANL	Estadio Azteca, Mexico City
16:00	Vuoso (yellow card) 90'; Rosinei (yellow card) 90+3'	Report	Jiménez (yellow card) 30'; Mancilla 34'; Juninho (yellow card) 63'; Dueñas (yellow card) 86'	Referee: Roberto García Orozco

February 11, 2012 Round 6	Atlas	1 – 1	América	Estadio Jalisco, Guadalajara
20:45	Erpen (yellow card) 29'; Rodríguez 34', (yellow card) 59'; Maldonado (yellow card) 41'; Barraza (yellow card) 80'	Report	Aguilar 39'; Mosquera (yellow card) 41'; Cárdenas (yellow card) 61'; Viscarrondo (yellow card) 90+2'	Referee: Jorge Isaac Rojas

February 19, 2012 Round 7	América	1 – 0	Pachuca	Estadio Azteca, Mexico City
16:00	Vizcarrondo (yellow card) 2'; Benítez 57'; García (yellow card) 80'	Report	López (yellow card) 9'; Torres (yellow card) 68'; Muñoz Mustafá (yellow card) 81'; Vidrio (yellow card) 89'; Arreola (yellow card) 90+1'; Briambila (yellow card) 90+4'	Referee: Miguel Ángel Ortega

February 25, 2012 Round 8	Atlante	0 – 4	América	Estadio Quintana Roo, Cancún
21:00	Castillo (yellow card) 19' (yellow-red card) 78'; Arroyo (yellow card) 49'	Report	Molina 3', (yellow card) 38'; Benítez 27' (pen.), 57'; Mosquera (yellow card) 31'; Vizcarrondo 81'	Referee: Mauricio Morales

March 4, 2012 Round 9	América	2 – 0	Chiapas	Estadio Azteca, Mexico City
16:00	Montenegro 27'; Herrera (red card) 88' (manager); Gallardo 90+3'	Report	E. Hernández (yellow card) 83'	Referee: Ricardo Arellano

March 9, 2012 Round 10	Tijuana	1 – 1	América	Estadio Caliente, Tijuana
18:10	Sand (red card) 6'; Riascos (yellow card) 59', (goal) 63'; Arévalo Ríos (red card) 73'	Report	Medina (yellow card) 15'; Molina (yellow card) 39'; Vizcarrondo (yellow card) 60'; Jiménez 62'	Referee: José Alfredo Peñaloza

March 18, 2012 Round 11	América	2 – 1	UNAM	Estadio Azteca, Mexico City
16:00	Benítez (yellow card) 9'; Mosquera (yellow card) 28'; Herrera (manager) (red card) 82'; Vuoso 86'; Aguilar (yellow card) 90+2'	Report	García (yellow card) 7' (yellow-red card) 80'; Pimentel (yellow card) 55'; Cacho (yellow card) 57'; Bravo (yellow card) 90+2'	Referee: Jorge Antonio Pérez

March 23, 2012 Round 12	Morelia	3 – 1	América	Estadio Morelos, Morelia
19:10	Valdez 8', (yellow card) 82'; Sabah 20'; Ramírez (yellow card) 27'; Lugo (yellow card) 55'; Lozano 70' (pen.)		Mosquera (yellow card) 30'; Benítez 31', (yellow card) 33'; Montenegro (yellow card) 70'; Cárdenas (yellow card) 90+1'	Referee: Antony Zanjuampa

April 1, 2012 Round 13	América	2 – 3	Monterrey	Estadio Azteca, Mexico City
16:00	Montenegro (yellow card) 7'; Molina (yellow card) 11'; Benítez 20', 59'; Cárdenas (yellow card) 41'; García (yellow card) 90+7'	Report	Zavala (yellow card) 18'; L. Pérez (yellow card) 30'; Suazo 47'; Carreño 85'; Reyna 90+5'	Referee: Francisco Chacón

April 8, 2012 Round 14	Guadalajara	0 – 1	América	Estadio Omnilife, Zapopan
18:00	Fabián (yellow card) 23'; Álvarez (yellow card) 36'; Araujo (yellow card) 45+'; Báez (yellow card) 49'; Reynoso (red card) 90+2'	Report	Pimentel (yellow card) 10'; Cárdenas (yellow card) 48'; Aguilar 85'	Referee: Marco Antonio Rodríguez

April 14, 2012 Round 15	América	3 – 1	Santos Laguna	Estadio Azteca, Mexico City
17:00	Medina (yellow card) 9'; Bermúdez 38'; Benítez 70'; Vuoso 77'	Report	Hoyos (yellow card) 12'; Ochoa 44'; Crosas (yellow card) 83'	Referee: Jorge Isaac Rojas

April 22, 2012 Round 16	Puebla	2 – 3	América	Estadio Cuauhtémoc, Puebla
16:00	Luis García 24'; Durán (yellow card) 27'; Beasley 48'; Salinas (yellow card) 90+3'	Report	Montenegro 6'; Vizcarrondo (yellow card) 28'; Benítez (yellow card) 42', (goal) 86' (pen.); Pinedo 48' (o.g.)	Referee: Ricardo Arellano

April 29, 2012 Round 17	América	2 – 2	Cruz Azul	Estadio Azteca, Mexico City
16:00	Aguilar (yellow card) 7'; Benítez 8', 13', (yellow card) 14'; Medina (yellow card) 35'; Reyes (yellow card) 45+'; Layún (yellow card) 85'	Report	Pereira 23', (yellow card) 39' (yellow-red card) 87'; Villa 73'	Referee: Mauricio Morales

=== Final phase ===
May 2, 2012 Quarter-finals	Pachuca	1 – 3	América	Estadio Hidalgo, Pachuca
20:30	Rodríguez (yellow card) 14'; Muñoz Mustafá (yellow card) 54'; Vidrio (yellow card) 65'; López 77'	Report	Molina (yellow card) 21', (goal) 38'; Bermúdez 42', 58'; Reyes (yellow card) 76'; Muñoz (yellow card) 83'	Referee: Erim Ramírez

May 5, 2012 Quarter-finals	América	0 – 1	Pachuca	Estadio Azteca, Mexico City
18:00	Mosquera (yellow card) 75'	Report	López (yellow card) 13'; Vidrio 37', (yellow card) 44'	Referee: Marco Antonio Rodríguez

América advanced 3–2 on aggregate

May 9, 2012 Semi-finals	América	0 – 0	Monterrey	Estadio Azteca, Mexico City
21:00	Vuoso (yellow card) 33'; Aguilar (yellow card) 42' (yellow-red card) 83'; Molina (yellow card) 71'; Mosquera (yellow card) 77'	Report	Chávez (yellow card) 36'; Basanta (yellow card) 45+'; Mier (yellow card) 86'	Referee: Mauricio Morales

May 12, 2012 Semi-finals	Monterrey	2 – 0	América	Estadio Tecnológico, Monterrey
21:00	Basanta 9', (yellow card) 55' de Nigris 52'	Report	Molina (yellow card) 29'; Vuoso (yellow card) 67'; Mosquera (yellow card) 75'	Referee: Roberto García Orozco

Monterrey advanced 2–0 on aggregate

=== Goalscorers ===
==== Regular season ====
Position	Nation	Name	Goals scored
1.	(Ecuador)	Christian Benítez	14
2.	(Mexico)	Vicente Matías Vuoso	3
3.	(Mexico)	Paul Aguilar	2
3.	(Argentina)	Daniel Montenegro	2
5.	(Mexico)	Christian Bermúdez	1
5.	(Mexico)	Lugiani Gallardo	1
5.	(Mexico)	Raúl Jiménez	1
5.	(Mexico)	Juan Carlos Medina	1
5.	(Mexico)	Jesús Molina	1
5.	(Brazil)	Rosinei	1
5.	(Venezuela)	Oswaldo Vizcarrondo	1
5.		Own Goals	1
TOTAL			31

==== Final phase ====
Position	Nation	Name	Goals scored
1.	(Mexico)	Christian Bermúdez	2
2.	(Mexico)	Jesús Molina	1
TOTAL			3

=== Results ===
==== Results summary ====
Overall								Home						Away					
Pld	W	D	L	GF	GA	GD	Pts	W	D	L	GF	GA	GD	W	D	L	GF	GA	GD
17	9	5	3	31	18	+13	32	4	2	2	13	9	+4	5	3	1	18	9	+9

Last updated: 29 April 2012.
Source: Clausura 2012 results

==== Results by round ====
Round	1	2	3	4	5	6	7	8	9	10	11	12	13	14	15	16	17
Ground	A	H	A	A	H	A	H	A	H	A	H	A	H	A	H	A	H
Result	W	D	D	W	L	D	W	W	W	D	W	L	L	W	W	W	D
Position	2	3	6	2	6	9	7	2	2	3	3	5	5	5	5	2	3

Updated to match(es) played on 29 April 2012. Source: Clausura 2012 results and mediotiempo.com
A = Away; H = Home; W = Win; D = Draw; L = Loss
