= Agricultores F.C. Guasave =

Agricultores F.C.
- Full name: Agricultores Fútbol Club
- Nickname: Agricultores (Farmers)
- Founded: 21 May 2024; 23 months ago
- Dissolved: 27 June 2025; 9 months ago
- Ground: Estadio Unidad Deportiva Raúl Ramírez Lozano; Ensenada, Baja California
- Capacity: 7,600
- Owner(s): Felipe Ignacio Lameiro Meza; Cristián Iván Rivera Ramírez
- Chairman: Christian Lameiro Meza
- League: Liga Premier – Serie A
- Clausura 2025: 11th, Group I
Home colours	Away colours

Agricultores F.C. was a football club that played in the Liga Premier – Serie A of the Segunda División de México, the third division level of Mexican football. It was based in Ensenada, Baja California, however in its beginnings, the team was based in Guasave, Sinaloa.

== History ==
The team was founded on May 21, 2024 in Guasave, Sinaloa, as an initiative of local businessmen and the Guasave municipal council to return a professional soccer team to that city, after the dissolution of Diablos Azules de Guasave in 2018. The team announced former Colombian footballer Aquivaldo Mosquera as its first manager.

Agricultores F.C. played their first match on June 15, 2024, in the match Guasave defeated a team made up of former Guadalajara footballers with a score of 3–1.

On June 28, 2024, the team was accepted into the Liga Premier – Serie A, being placed in Group 1.

On January 16, 2025 the team was relocated to Ensenada, Baja California.

In June 2025, the club's board of directors renamed the team Ensenada, due to the team's permanent residence in the city, thus ending the history of Agricultores F.C. Guasave.

== Stadium ==
The Estadio Municipal de Ensenada, officially named Estadio de la Unidad Deportiva Raúl Ramírez Lozano, is a multi-use stadium in Ensenada, Baja California. It is used mostly for football matches and is the home stadium for Agricultores F.C.

== Managers ==
- (Colombia) Aquivaldo Mosquera (2024)
- (Mexico) Christian Patiño (2024)
- (Mexico) Paolo Serrato (2025)
