= Mexicali F.C. =

Mexican association football club

- Full name: Mexicali Fútbol Club
- Nickname: Dragones (Dragons)
- Founded: October 2021; 4 years ago
- Dissolved: 27 June 2025; 9 months ago
- Ground: Ciudad Deportiva Mexicali; Mexicali, Baja California
- Capacity: 5,000
- Owner(s): Daniel Wong Seto; George Wong Chu; Darío Ramón Wong Lee
- Chairman: Ernesto Navarrete Federico
- Manager: Omar Ramírez
- League: Liga Premier – Serie A
- Clausura 2025: 12th, Group I
Home colours	Away colours

Mexicali F.C. was a Mexican professional football club that played in the Liga Premier - Serie A of the Segunda División de México, the third division level of Mexican football. It was based in Mexicali, Baja California.

== History ==
The team was announced in October 2021, although the name or identity it would hold was unknown. In the first half of 2022, more details about the club began to be known, including the name, nickname, colors and the stadium they would use.

On July 1, 2022, the team's participation in the Liga Premier – Serie A was confirmed. Mexicali F.C. was the first team in the city to participate in the Segunda División de México.

On June 27, 2025, Mexicali F.C. was relocated to Toluca, State of Mexico and renamed Dragones Toluca F.C., because the team was left without adequate sports facilities for its continuity in Mexicali, since the club's stadium was subject to remodeling works. However, the team plans to return to Mexicali when its stadium is fully operational.

== Players ==
=== First-team squad ===
As of January 11, 2025

Note: Flags indicate national team as defined under FIFA eligibility rules; some limited exceptions apply. Players may hold more than one non-FIFA nationality.

No. / Pos. / Nation / Player	No. / Pos. / Nation / Player

== Managers ==
- (Mexico) Agustín Hernández (2022)
- (Mexico) Enrique López Zarza (2022–2023)
- (Mexico) Manuel Naya Barba (2023–2024)
- (Mexico) Omar Ramírez (2024–2025)
