= Kaleth Hernández =

Mexican footballer (born 2001)

Personal information
- Full name: Neder Kaleth Hernández Medina
- Date of birth: 26 January 2001 (age 25)
- Place of birth: Monterrey, Nuevo León, Mexico
- Height: 1.67 m (5 ft 6 in)
- Position: Winger

Team information
- Current team: Lobos ULMX
- Number: 26

Youth career
- 2018–2021: Monterrey

Senior career*
Years	Team	Apps	(Gls)
2021–2023	Monterrey	7	(0)
2021–2022	→ Raya2 (loan)	16	(0)
2023	→ Atlético Morelia (loan)	21	(1)
2023	→ Oaxaca (loan)	11	(2)
2024	Santiago	12	(1)
2024	Ordino	0	(0)
2025	Rànger's	17	(2)
2026	Celaya	10	(3)
2026–	Lobos ULMX	1	(0)
- * Club domestic league appearances and goals as of 5 September 2026

Neder Kaleth Hernández Medina (born 26 January 2001) is a Mexican professional footballer who plays as a winger for Lobos ULMX.

== Career statistics ==
=== Club ===
As of 23 August 2022

Club	Season	League			Cup		Continental		Other		Total	
Club	Season	Division	Apps	Goals	Apps	Goals	Apps	Goals	Apps	Goals	Apps	Goals
Monterrey	2020–21	Liga MX	—		—		2 (Note: Appearances in CONCACAF Champions League)	0	—		2	0
Monterrey	2021–22	Liga MX	7	0	—		—		—		7	0
Monterrey	Total		7	0	—		2	0	—		9	0
Raya2 (loan)	2021–22	Liga de Expansión MX	12	0	—		—		—		12	0
Raya2 (loan)	2022–23	Liga de Expansión MX	4	0	—		—		—		4	0
Raya2 (loan)	Total		16	0	—		—		—		16	0
Career total			23	0	0	0	2	0	0	0	25	0

== Honours ==
Monterrey

- CONCACAF Champions League: 2021
