= Juan Román Pucheta =

Argentine professional footballer

Personal information
- Date of birth: 11 July 2002 (age 24)
- Place of birth: Merlo, Argentina
- Height: 1.82 m (6 ft 0 in)
- Position: Centre-forward

Team information
- Current team: Racing de Veracruz (on loan from Argentinos Juniors)

Youth career
- Argentinos Juniors

Senior career*
Years	Team	Apps	(Gls)
2020–	Argentinos Juniors	11	(2)
2021	→ Tristán Suárez (loan)	11	(3)
2022	→ San Martín SJ (loan)	11	(0)
2022	→ Brown de Adrogué (loan)	9	(0)
2023	→ La Luz (loan)	8	(0)
2024	→ Sud América (loan)	29	(6)
2025	→ Irapuato (loan)	10	(2)
2026	→ Atlético Guayaquil (loan)	0	(0)
2026–	→ Racing de Veracruz (loan)	0	(0)
- * Club domestic league appearances and goals as of 05:02, 16 February 2025 (UTC)

Juan Román Pucheta (born 11 July 2002) is an Argentine professional footballer who plays as a centre-forward for Liga Premier de México club Racing de Veracruz, on loan from AFA Liga Profesional de Fútbol club Argentinos Juniors.

== Career ==
Pucheta came through the youth ranks of Argentinos Juniors, eventually signing his first professional contract in June 2020; penning terms until 31 December 2024. He made the breakthrough into first-team football at the age of eighteen, initially featuring in pre-season friendlies against the likes of Talleres and Atlanta. His senior debut arrived on 31 October 2020, after the centre-forward was substituted on with seven minutes remaining of a goalless draw at home to San Lorenzo in the Copa de la Liga Profesional. In that competition, Pucheta scored his first goal on 30 November in a 4–1 win away against Aldosivi.

In July 2021, Pucheta joined Tristán Suárez on a loan deal for the rest of the year. In January 2022, he was sent out on a new loan, this time to San Martín SJ, for one year. However, the spell was cut short half through, at it was exchanged with a loan spell at Brown de Adrogué instead, until the end of 2023, which was confirmed in June 2022.

== Career statistics ==
As of 1 December 2020.

Appearances and goals by club, season and competition
Club	Season	League			Cup		League Cup		Continental		Other		Total	
Club	Season	Division	Apps	Goals	Apps	Goals	Apps	Goals	Apps	Goals	Apps	Goals	Apps	Goals
Argentinos Juniors	2020–21 (Note: Soccerway counts Copa de la Liga Profesional appearances as league appearances.)	Primera División	3	1	0	0	0	0	—		0	0	3	1
Career total			3	1	0	0	0	0	—		0	0	3	1
