= Montañeses F.C. =

Montañeses
- Full name: Montañeses Fútbol Club
- Nickname: Montañeses (Mountaineers)
- Founded: 22 July 2021; 5 years ago
- Ground: Estadio Socum
- Capacity: 7,000
- Owner(s): Francisco Jiménez, Pedro Schettino, Roberto Diez, Eli Chahín
- Chairman: Francisco Jiménez
- Manager: Víctor Medina
- League: Liga Premier (Primera Premier)
- 2025–26: Regular phase: 6th of 13 (Group III); Final phase: Not qualified
Home colours	Away colours

Montañeses Fútbol Club is a professional football club based in Orizaba, Veracruz. The club competes in Liga Premier (Primera Premier), the third level of Mexican football, and plays its home matches at Estadio Socum. Founded in 2021, after the franchise of Fuertes de Fortín was moved from Fortín de las Flores to Orizaba.

== History ==
On 26 June 2021, Fuertes de Fortín, a club from Fortín de las Flores, Veracruz, won promotion from the Liga TDP to the Liga Premier de México after defeating Toluca in the regional final. Following this result, the team secured a place in the Liga Premier (Serie A). A week later, the club won the national championship in that category.

After being promoted, the Fuertes de Fortín board of directors began to receive offers from other cities such as Córdoba, Orizaba, Xalapa and Tuxtepec to relocate the club in those locations, due to the fact that the sports facilities of Fortín de las Flores did not comply with the requirements to participate in the Segunda División. However, the team intended to continue playing in their hometown even though they could not promote. At the end of July, Orizaba's offer began to gain acceptance among the club's owners.

On July 22, 2021, Fuertes de Fortín was sold to businessmen from Orizaba, who relocated it to their city and was renamed Montañeses F.C., after the originally proposed name, Academia Orizaba F.C., could not be used due to the disaffiliation of Albinegros de Orizaba, former club that played in Orizaba, which had the right to use the name of the city in Mexican football. On July 30, the club's participation in Serie A was confirmed, being placed in Group 2.

== Stadium ==
The Estadio Socum (deriving from So-Cu-M, the short version of its full name Estadio de la Sociedad Cuauhtémoc Moctezuma) is a football stadium in Orizaba, Veracruz and it has capacity for 7,000 people.

Between 2021 and February 2023, the team played its matches at the Complejo Deportivo Orizaba Sur, a sports complex that has a football stadium which has an approximate capacity for 3,000 people.

== Players ==
=== First-team squad ===
As of 2 September 2026

Note: Flags indicate national team as defined under FIFA eligibility rules; some limited exceptions apply. Players may hold more than one non-FIFA nationality.

No.	Pos.	Nation	Player
1	GK	MEX	Jesús Domínguez
2	DF	MEX	Víctor Rodríguez
3	DF	MEX	Christopher Lisazo
4	DF	MEX	Manlio Rivera
5	MF	MEX	Lenin Camacho
7	MF	MEX	Isaác Muñíz
8	MF	MEX	César Cortés
9	FW	URU	Máximo Plada
11	FW	COL	Carlos Amaya
12	MF	MEX	Ian Ramos
13	FW	MEX	Ulises Osorio
14	DF	MEX	Luis Galicia
15	MF	MEX	Salvador Galicia

No.	Pos.	Nation	Player
16	DF	MEX	Ángel Ramos
17	MF	MEX	Esvith Andrade
18	FW	MEX	Carlos Rodríguez
19	MF	MEX	Emmanuel Oliva
20	MF	MEX	César Solís
21	MF	MEX	Hugo Puig
23	MF	MEX	Aldo Hernández
25	MF	MEX	Francisco Hernández
26	DF	MEX	Diego Ornelas
27	DF	MEX	Eliseo Acevedo
29	MF	MEX	Eduardo Díaz
31	GK	MEX	Oscar Quitl
36	DF	MEX	Alan Pérez

== Reserves ==
=== Montañeses Potros Casino Español ===
The team competes in the Liga TDP, the fourth level of Mexican football.

== Managers ==
- (Mexico) Víctor Hernández (2021–2024)
- (Mexico) Andrés Garza (2025)
- (Mexico) Víctor Medina (2025–)
