= Ademar Rodríguez =

Mexican footballer (born 1990)

Personal information
- Full name: Andrés Ademar Rodríguez Enríquez
- Date of birth: March 23, 1990 (age 36)
- Place of birth: Mexico City, Mexico
- Height: 1.77 m (5 ft 10 in)
- Position: Left-back

Youth career
- 2007–2011: América

Senior career*
Years	Team	Apps	(Gls)
2011–2013	América	1	(0)
2013–2014	Necaxa	0	(0)
2014	Orizaba	12	(0)
2015–2016	Tlaxcala	25	(1)
2020	Atlético Jalisco	0	(0)
- * Club domestic league appearances and goals as of 1 July 2012

Andrés Ademar Rodríguez (born 23 March 1990) is a Mexican former footballer. He last played for Tlaxcala F.C. in the Second Division League of Mexico.

== Honours ==
América

- Liga MX (1): Clausura 2013
