= Renato Michell González =

Mexican footballer (born 1988)

Renato González
Personal information
- Full name: Renato Michell González Castellanos
- Date of birth: October 4, 1988 (age 38)
- Place of birth: Mexico City, Mexico
- Position: Midfielder

Senior career*
Years	Team	Apps	(Gls)
2007–10	Club América	7	(1)
2010–11	3 de Febrero	0	(0)
2012	→ Mérida (loan)	4	(0)
2013	Potros UAEM	0	(0)
2013–14	Zacatepec	9	(1)
2015	Global	?	(?)
- * Club domestic league appearances and goals as of 1 July 2012

Renato Michell González Castellanos (born October 4, 1988) is a Mexican footballer who currently plays as a midfielder.
