= Lobos ULMX =

- Full name: Club Lobos de la Universidad Latina de México
- Nickname: Lobos (Wolves)
- Founded: 12 March 2021; 5 years ago
- Ground: Estadio Miguel Alemán Valdés
- Capacity: 23,182
- Owner: ULMX
- Chairman: Enrique Lemus Muñoz Ledo
- Manager: Wilder Mosquera
- League: Liga Premier (Primera Premier)
- 2025–26: Regular phase: 7th of 14 (Group II); Final phase: Not qualified
Home colours	Away colours

Club Lobos de la Universidad Latina de México, simply known as Lobos ULMX, is a professional football club based in Celaya, Guanajuato. The club competes in Liga Premier (Primera Premier), the third level of Mexican football, and plays its home matches at Estadio Miguel Alemán Valdés. Founded in 2021, the club represents the Latin University of Mexico (ULMX).

== History ==
On March 12, 2021, an agreement was signed between Celaya and the Universidad Latina de México with the objective of establishing a football team that would participate in the Segunda División de México, which would bear the name of the university, but would be based on the franchise that the club already had in that league. As part of the agreement, Celaya provided the soccer players, the coaching staff, the stadium and the training facilities, while the ULM contributed with the identity and the financial part, in addition to offering university education for the players incorporated into the team.

In April 2021, the university board made official the project to build a stadium to host the institution's soccer and football games, which will have a capacity to hold 1,200 spectators.

The team was officially entered into soccer competitions on July 30, 2021, when its entry into the Liga Premier (Serie A) was announced, the club was placed in Group 2 of this category.

On August 3, Rowan Vargas was announced as the club's first manager. The following day the first players of the team were announced: Alejandro Padua, Ricardo Chávez, Rafael Rodea and Rogelio Calixto.

In June 2025, Lobos ULMX became an independent team from the Celaya F.C. sports structure, becoming a separate club with full rights as a Segunda División participant, including the possibility of promotion.

== Stadium ==
The team plays its home games in the Estadio Miguel Alemán Valdés, that is the Celaya F.C. ground and is used by Lobos ULMX due to its status as an affiliated team, this stadium has a capacity for 23,182.

== Players ==
=== Current squad ===
As of 8 October 2026

Note: Flags indicate national team as defined under FIFA eligibility rules; some limited exceptions apply. Players may hold more than one non-FIFA nationality.

No.	Pos.	Nation	Player
1	GK	MEX	Roberto Fonseca
3	DF	MEX	Héctor Madera
4	DF	MEX	Víctor Moreno
5	DF	MEX	Noé Topete
6	MF	MEX	Marco González
7	FW	MEX	Moisés Suárez
8	MF	MEX	Marco Ibarra
9	FW	MEX	Mauricio Farjeat
10	FW	COL	Jhonatan González
11	DF	COL	Carlos Herrera
12	MF	MEX	Hailton Muñoz
14	MF	MEX	Israel Ibarra
16	FW	MEX	Javier Téllez

No.	Pos.	Nation	Player
17	DF	MEX	Érick Aceves
18	MF	MEX	Brayam Blancas
20	DF	MEX	Omar Lomelí
21	DF	MEX	Gael Ferreira
22	FW	MEX	Enrique Díaz
23	DF	MEX	Andrés Mares
25	GK	MEX	Pedro Aguilar
26	MF	MEX	Kaleth Hernández
27	DF	MEX	Ángel Morales
29	FW	MEX	Érick García
30	MF	MEX	Yael González
32	FW	MEX	Kevin Villanueva

== Honours ==
=== Domestic ===
==== Lower levels ====
- Torneo de Filiales Liga Premier
  - Runners-up (1): Clausura 2023

== Reserves ==
=== Lobos ULMX TDP ===
Reserve team that plays in the Liga TDP, the fourth level of Mexican football.

== Managers ==
- (Mexico) Rowan Vargas (2021–2025)
- (Colombia) Aquivaldo Mosquera (2025–2026)
- (Colombia) Wilder Mosquera (2026–)
