= Patricio Treviño =

Mexican footballer (born 1989)

Personal information
- Full name: Patricio Enrique Treviño Tripp
- Date of birth: 28 December 1989 (age 36)
- Place of birth: Mexico City, Mexico
- Position: Defender

Team information
- Current team: América U-19 (Manager)

Senior career*
Years	Team	Apps	(Gls)
2010–2015	Club América	14	(0)
2013	→ Querétaro (loan)	0	(0)
2014–2015	→ Atlético San Luis (loan)	1	(0)

Managerial career
- 2022–: América Reserves and Academy
- * Club domestic league appearances and goals as of 1 January 2014

Patricio Enrique Treviño Tripp (Note: In this Spanish name, the first or paternal surname is Treviño and the second or maternal family name is Tripp.) (born 28 December 1989) is a Mexican former footballer who played as a defender. On 7 August 2010, he made his debut with Club América in a game against Tigres UANL.
