= Rosinei =

Brazilian footballer (born 1983)

Personal information
- Full name: Adolfo Rosinei Nascimento
- Date of birth: May 3, 1983 (age 43)
- Place of birth: Lavrinhas, Brazil
- Height: 1.70 m (5 ft 7 in)
- Position: Midfielder

Team information
- Current team: CA Juventus

Youth career
- 2000–2002: Corinthians
- 2002: Cruzeiro-SP

Senior career*
Years	Team	Apps	(Gls)
2003	São Caetano		
2004–2007	Corinthians	106	(194)
2008–2010	Murcia	11	(0)
2008–2009	→ Internacional (loan)	37	(1)
2009–2010	→ América (loan)	50	(1)
2011–2013	América	43	(2)
2013–2014	Atlético Mineiro	24	(2)
2014	→ Coritiba (loan)	12	(0)
2015–2016	Coritiba		
2015–2016	→ Paraná (loan)		
2016	Tigres do Brasil		
2016	Fortaleza	0	(0)
2017	Almirante Barroso		
2017	CSA		
2018–	CA Juventus		
- * Club domestic league appearances and goals

Adolfo Rosinei Nascimento or simply Rosinei (born May 3, 1983) is a Brazilian former professional footballer who played as a midfielder.

== Career ==
Rosinei was born in Lavrinhas. He played for Corinthians till 2007 and won one Campeonato Brasileiro in 2005. He moved to Murcia in January 2008. In July 2008, he was transferred to Internacional. In 2009, he was transferred to Club América on a one-year loan contract. On April 22, 2010, Club América officials announced that Rosinei's loan contract with America had been converted to an official three-year expansion meaning that Rosinei was to remain with Club América permanently.

== Style of play ==
Rosinei was known for winning the ball and possessing good ball control and passing range as he played the ball forward.

== Honours ==
Corinthians

- Campeonato Brasileiro Série A: 2005

Internacional

- Copa Sudamericana: 2008
- Campeonato Gaúcho: 2009

Atlético Mineiro

- Campeonato Mineiro: 2013
- Copa Libertadores: 2013
