= Omar Ramírez =

Mexican football manager

Personal information
- Full name: Omar Ramírez Lara
- Date of birth: 6 August 1973 (age 53)
- Place of birth: Toluca, State of Mexico, Mexico
- Height: 1.72 m (5 ft 8 in)

Managerial career
- Years: Team
- 2013–2017: Potros UAEM
- 2018–2019: Potros UAEM (Assistant)
- 2020: Atlante (Assistant)
- 2022–2024: Escorpiones Zacatepec
- 2024–2025: Mexicali
- 2026: Dragones Toluca

Omar Ramírez Lara (born 6 August 1973) is a Mexican manager. Since December 2025 he is the manager of Liga Premier team Dragones Toluca.

== Coaching career ==
Ramírez started his coaching career with Potros UAEM, from 2013 to 2017, gaining the promotion from Segunda División de México to Ascenso MX. In 2018, due to poor results, he was demoted to assistant manager of Héctor Hugo Eugui. In 2020, he joined the technical staff of Atlante.

In 2022, Ramírez was appointed as manager of Escorpiones Zacatepec the Liga Premier de México. Ramírez remained on the team until January 2024.

On July 10, 2024 he was named the new manager of Mexicali F.C.

On December 26, 2025 he was named the new manager of Dragones Toluca.

== Controversy ==
In 2017, Francisco Pizarro, former Potros UAEM player, accused Ramírez of charging for fielding players. Ramírez denied all the accusations.
