= Lugiani Gallardo =

Mexican footballer (born 1991)

Personal information
- Full name: Lugiani Iván Gallardo Rodríguez
- Date of birth: 20 April 1991 (age 35)
- Place of birth: Mexico City, Mexico
- Height: 1.66 m (5 ft 5 1/2 in)
- Positions: Forward; winger

Team information
- Current team: América U-19 (Assistant)

Senior career*
Years	Team	Apps	(Gls)
2009–2013	América	10	(1)
2012–2013	→ Necaxa (loan)	6	(0)
2013–2014	→ Estudiantes Tecos (loan)	14	(2)
2014–2015	Veracruz	0	(0)
2014–2015	→ Orizaba (loan)	12	(1)
2015–2016	Tlaxcala	25	(3)
2016–2017	Zacatepec	3	(0)
2017	→ Athletic Club Morelos (loan)	5	(0)
2018	University of Pretoria	18	(4)
2020	Morelos	0	(0)

International career
2011	Mexico U20	2	(0)

Managerial career
- 2024–: América Reserves and Academy
Medal record
Representing Mexico
Winner	CONCACAF U-20 Championship	2011
Third place	FIFA U-20 World Cup	2011
- * Club domestic league appearances and goals as of 1 July 2013

Lugiani Iván Gallardo Rodríguez (born 20 April 1991) is a Mexican former footballer.

== Club career ==
Gallardo useed to play for South African club University of Pretoria.

== Honours ==
Mexico U20

- CONCACAF U-20 Championship: 2011
- FIFA U-20 World Cup 3rd Place: 2011
