= Víctor Medina (Mexican footballer) =

Mexican footballer and manager

Personal information
- Full name: Víctor Medina Martínez
- Date of birth: 9 October 1964 (age 62)
- Place of birth: San Luis Potosí City, Mexico
- Height: 1.70 m (5 ft 7 in)
- Position: Midfielder

Team information
- Current team: Montañeses (Manager)

Senior career*
Years	Team	Apps	(Gls)
1984–1988	Atlético Potosino		
1988–1990	Atlante		
1990–1993	Veracruz		
1993–1994	Atlante		
1994–1997	Veracruz		

Managerial career
- 2009–2010: América (assistant)
- 2010–2012: San Luis (assistant)
- 2012: Veracruz "B"
- 2013–2014: Atlético San Luis (assistant)
- 2016–2017: América (assistant)
- 2017–2021: América (reserves and academy)
- 2022: Toluca (assistant)
- 2024–2025: Irapuato
- 2025–: Montañeses
- * Club domestic league appearances and goals as of 25 June 2025

Víctor Medina Martínez (born 9 October 1964 or 1965) is a Mexican former professional footballer and manager.
