= Estadio Socum =

Football stadium in Orizaba, Veracruz, Mexico

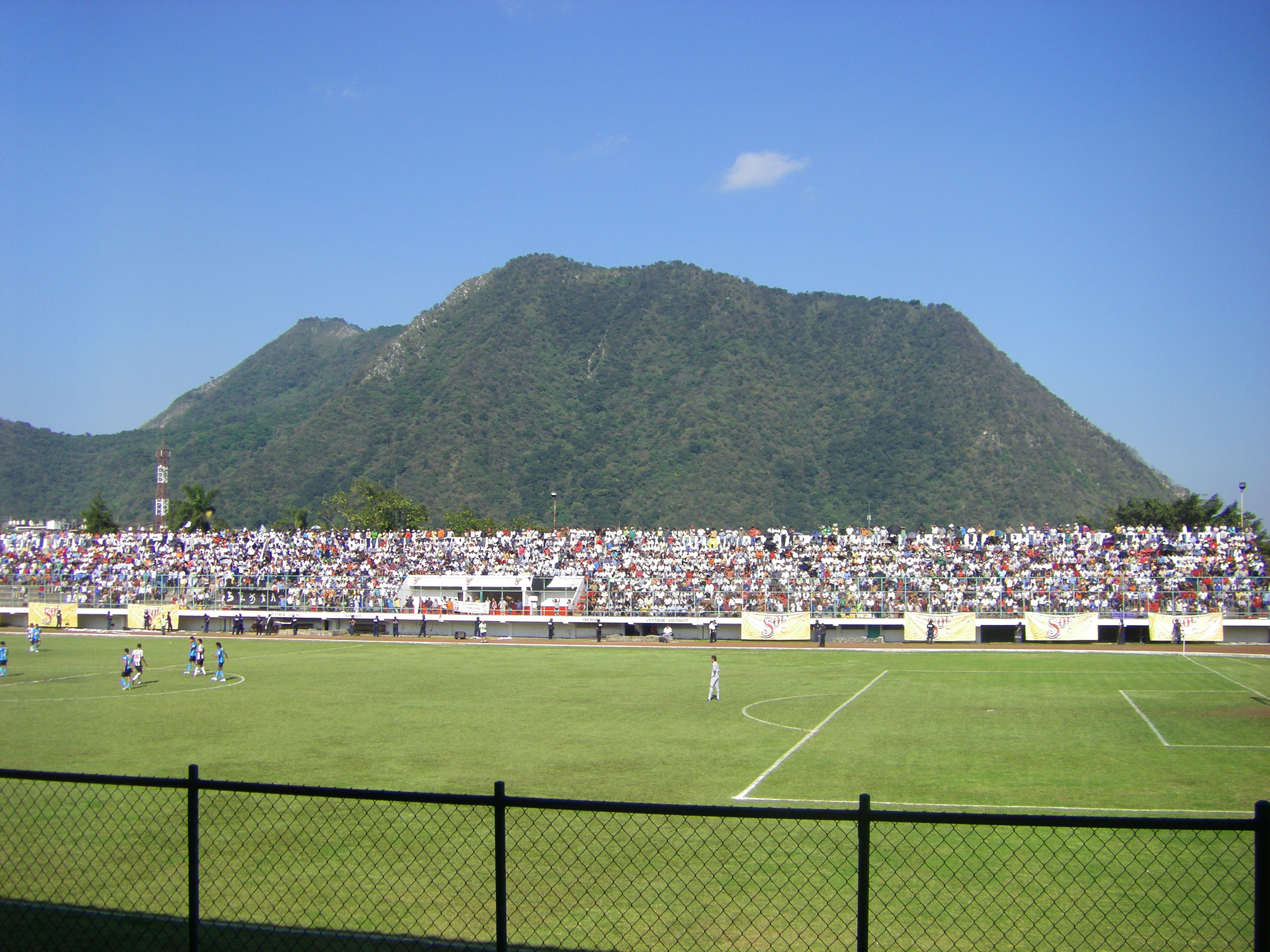
- The stands (sol = sun), seen from the seats (sombra = shadow)
- Interactive map of Estadio Socum
- Full name: Estadio de la Sociedad Cuauhtémoc Moctezuma
- Location: Calle Norte 10; Orizaba; Veracruz; Mexico
- Coordinates: 18°51′26″N 97°6′10″W
- Operator: Montañeses F.C.
- Capacity: 7,000
- Surface: Grass

Construction
- Opened: around 1959 or later

Tenants
- Orizaba F.C. Albinegros de Orizaba; Montañeses F.C.

Estadio Socum (deriving from So-Cu-M, the short version of its full name Estadio de la Sociedad Cuauhtémoc Moctezuma) is a football stadium in Orizaba, Veracruz, Mexico, and the home of Montañeses F.C.

== First football grounds in Orizaba ==
=== Cancha de Santa Gertrudis ===
The first football ground in Orizaba was the cancha de Santa Gertrudis de Yute which was located on the ground of the factory of the same name in which the founders of the historic Orizaba A.C. were working. This ground was formed around 1900 and was located in the Eastern part of Orizaba.

=== Cancha de Cocolapan ===
After the team of Orizaba A.C. has folded, a new team was formed in 1916 and soon took the name Asociación Deportiva Orizabeña, short A.D.O., which started to play on the old cancha de Santa Gertrudis de Yute but soon established a new ground on the site of the textile factory “Cocolapan” on calle Sur 6 on the South side of the city. The surface of the newly formed cancha de Cocolapan was mentioned to be excellent.

=== Campo Moctezuma ===
After the Moctezuma Brewery has formed its own football team in 1932, they established a new ground on their site and named it respectively Campo Moctezuma. This new ground was not far from cancha de Cocolapan which was still in use by their town rivals A.D.O. at this time and have had its entrance on the corner of the streets Avenida Poniente 9 and calle Sur 14 where the old gate is still to see, but now blocked by the wall of the brewery estate. When the brewery retired their team from the second league in 1954 and needed more storage capacity, they have demolished this ground.

== History of Estadio Socum ==
Modern day Estadio Socum was probably established to enable Orizaba F.C. to play their home-matches in the second division where they have played from 1959 to 1968. It was originally named Estadio Moctezuma (also after the brewery which has bought the right to bear their name) and took its new name Estadio de la Sociedad Cuauhtémoc Moctezuma respectively Estadio Socum after the merger with the Cuauhtémoc Brewery from Monterrey in 1988. It is located in calle Norte 10 in the Northern part of the city.

== See also ==
- List of football stadiums in Mexico
