= Gerardo Castillo =

Mexican footballer (born 1986)

Personal information
- Full name: Gerardo Omar Castillo Zamorano
- Date of birth: 19 November 1986 (age 39)
- Place of birth: Mexico City, Mexico
- Height: 1.76 m (5 ft 9 in)
- Position: Centre-back

Team information
- Current team: Pioneros de Cancún (manager)

Senior career*
Years	Team	Apps	(Gls)
2006–2007	Real Colima	27	(0)
2008	Potros Neza	12	(0)
2007–2015	Atlante	53	(0)
2011	→ Mérida (loan)	9	(0)
2012–2014	→ Dorados de Sinaloa (loan)	28	(1)

Managerial career
- 2018–2021: Necaxa Reserves and Academy
- 2022: Necaxa (women)
- 2023: Necaxa TDP
- 2023–2024: Aguacateros CDU
- 2024: Atlético Morelia (Assistant)
- 2025: Zitácuaro
- 2025–2026: Irapuato (Assistant)
- 2026–: Pioneros de Cancún
- * Club domestic league appearances and goals as of 30 July 2012

Gerardo Omar Castillo Zamorano (Note: In this Spanish name, the first or paternal surname is Castillo and the second or maternal family name is Zamorano.) (born 19 November 1986), known as Gerardo Castillo, is a Mexican former football centre back and manager who currently is the manager assistant of Pioneros de Cancún.

== Career ==
Castillo was born in Mexico City and started his career at Real Colima.

Castillo made his debut for Atlante on September 29, 2007, against Deportivo Toluca. He had caught the attention of manager José Guadalupe Cruz, while playing for Atlante's filial team in Colima. The game ended in a 2–0 win for the Potros.

== Honours ==
Atlante

- Apertura 2007
