= Aquivaldo Mosquera =

Colombian footballer (born 1981)

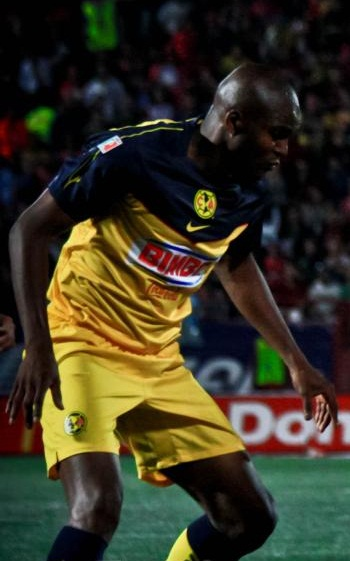
- Mosquera playing for América

Personal information
- Full name: Aquivaldo Mosquera Romaña
- Date of birth: 22 June 1981 (age 45)
- Place of birth: Apartadó, Colombia
- Height: 1.85 m (6 ft 1 in)
- Position: Defender

Senior career*
Years	Team	Apps	(Gls)
2000–2005	Atlético Nacional	154	(13)
2005–2007	Pachuca	77	(7)
2007–2009	Sevilla	41	(0)
2009–2014	América	180	(7)
2014–2016	Pachuca	54	(3)
2016	Deportivo Cali	12	(1)
2017	Chiapas	10	(0)

International career^{‡}
2000–2013	Colombia	29	(1)

Managerial career
- 2022: Cúcuta Deportivo
- 2023: Alebrijes Teotihuacán
- 2023–2024: Inter Querétaro
- 2024: Agricultores de Guasave
- 2025–2026: Lobos ULMX
- * Club domestic league appearances and goals as of 6 May 2017 ‡ National team caps and goals as of 13 October 2013

Aquivaldo Mosquera Romaña (born 22 June 1981) is a Colombian former professional footballer who played as a defender. He also holds Mexican citizenship.

== Club career ==
Mosquera made his debut in 2000 playing for Atlético Nacional. He would make over 150 appearances for the club before moving to Pachuca of Mexico in 2005. With Pachuca, he won two league titles (Clausura 2006 and 2007), a CONCACAF Champions' Cup in 2007, and a Copa Sudamericana in 2006. In the summer of 2007 Mosquera transferred to Sevilla FC of La Liga. Though he would stay with the club until 2009, Mosquera only managed to appear in 41 league matches.

In 2009, Mosquera returned to Mexico, this time to play for Club América for a reported USD6 million. Mosquera made his unofficial debut with América on 15 July 2009 in a 0–0 friendly against MLS club Colorado Rapids. He made his official league debut in a 1–1 draw against San Luis.

Mosquera, acting as club captain, won his first league title with América against Cruz Azul on 26 May 2013. He scored the first goal in the 2–1 second-leg win, with the club eventually winning the championship 4–2 on penalties.

On 4 June 2014, Mosquera was transferred to Pachuca, during the Mexican draft apertura 2014.

== International career ==
Mosquera has been called up to the Colombia national team on several occasions, including for the 2010 World Cup qualifiers and for various friendlies. He was the captain for the team during the first half of the World Cup qualifiers.

== Honours ==
Atlético Nacional

- Categoría Primera A: 2005-I

Pachuca

- Liga MX: Clausura 2006, Clausura 2007, Clausura 2016
- CONCACAF Champions' Cup: 2007
- Copa Sudamericana: 2006

Sevilla

- Spanish Super Cup: 2007

América

- Liga MX: Clausura 2013

Individual

- Mexican Balón de Oro: 2007
