= 2025 Copa Conecta =

Tournament details
- Country: Mexico
- Dates: 21 January 2025 – 18 March 2025
- Teams: 32

Final positions
- Champions: Santiago (1st title)
- Runners-up: Real Zamora

Tournament statistics
- Matches played: 31
- Goals scored: 69 (2.23 per match)

The 2025 Copa Conecta was the 4th edition of the Copa Conecta, a knockout competition for Mexican football clubs from Liga Premier and Liga TDP.

The Copa Conecta is an official Mexican tournament that was created in 2021 with the aim of providing a greater opportunity for development to the soccer players of the Premier and TDP league teams.

== Qualified teams ==
Teams ranked in places 1–12 of Serie B in the Apertura 2024 tournament.

- Artesanos Metepec (Serie B – 5th place)
- Atlético Pachuca (Serie B – 7th place)
- Ayense (Serie B – 10th place)
- Calor (Serie B – 8th place)
- Cañoneros (Serie B – 6th place)
- Ciervos (Serie B – 12th place)
- CDM (Serie B – 4th place)
- Cordobés (Serie B – 1st place)
- Huracanes Izcalli (Serie B – 11th place)
- Poza Rica (Serie B – 9th place)
- Real Zamora (Serie B – 3rd place)
- Santiago (Serie B – 2nd place)

Teams classified at the first place of the 17 groups of the Liga TDP and the top 3 classified in the league coefficient table.

- Deportiva Venados TDP (Liga TDP – Group 1)
- Delfines de Coatzacoalcos (Liga TDP – Group 2)
- Delfines UGM (Liga TDP – Group 3)
- Muxes (Liga TDP – Group 4)
- Héroes de Zaci (Liga TDP – Group 5)
- Artesanos Metepec TDP (Liga TDP – Group 6)
- Tigres Yautepec (Note: Franchise loan from Atlético Cuernavaca) (Liga TDP – Group 7)
- Bombarderos de Tecámac (Liga TDP – Group 8)
- Orgullo Surtam (Liga TDP – Group 9)
- Titanes de Querétaro (Liga TDP – Group 10)
- Deportivo Zamora (Liga TDP – Group 11)
- PFC Potosinos (Liga TDP – Group 12)
- Tapatíos Soccer (Liga TDP – Group 13)
- Guerreros de Autlán (Note: Franchise loan from Atlético Cocula) (Liga TDP – Group 14)
- Tigres de Álica TDP (Liga TDP – Group 15)
- Cadereyta (Liga TDP – Group 16)
- Etchojoa (Liga TDP – Group 17)
- Ecatepec (Liga TDP – Coefficient)
- Dragones de Oaxaca (Liga TDP – Coefficient)
- Fundadores (Liga TDP – Coefficient)

== Bracket ==
Round of 32
Ecatepec (p)	2 (4)
Dragones de Oaxaca	2 (3)
Delfines de Coatzacoalcos	1
Deportiva Venados TDP	0
Muxes	1
Huracanes Izcalli	0
Tigres Yautepec	3
CDM	2
Cadereyta	1 (2)
Santiago (p)	1 (3)
Orgullo Surtam	0
Poza Rica	1
Delfines UGM	0
Cañoneros	1
Bombarderos de Tecámac	0 (4)
Ciervos (p)	0 (5)
Guerreros de Autlán	2
Fundadores	0
Tigres de Álica TDP	2
Etchojoa	0
Tapatíos Soccer	2
Ayense	0
PFC Potosinos	2 (2)
Calor (p)	2 (4)
Héroes de Zaci (p)	1 (3)
Cordobés	1 (1)
Artesanos Metepec TDP	1
Artesanos Metepec	0
Titanes de Querétaro	0
Atlético Pachuca	3
Deportivo Zamora	1 (2)
Real Zamora (p)	1 (4)

Round of 16
Ecatepec	2
Delfines de Coatzacoalcos	1
Muxes	0
Tigres Yautepec	1
Santiago (p)	2 (7)
Poza Rica	2 (6)
Cañoneros (p)	0 (4)
Ciervos	0 (2)
Guerreros de Autlán	0
Tigres de Álica TDP	2
Tapatíos Soccer	1
Calor	3
Héroes de Zaci	3
Artesanos Metepec TDP	0
Atlético Pachuca	1 (2)
Real Zamora (p)	1 (3)

Quarter–finals
Ecatepec (p)	2 (12)
Tigres Yautepec	2 (11)
Santiago	2
Cañoneros	0
Tigres de Álica TDP	1 (3)
Calor (p)	1 (4)
Héroes de Zaci	0
Real Zamora	2

Semi–finals
Ecatepec	0
Santiago	2
Calor	1 (2)
Real Zamora (p)	1 (3)

Final
Santiago	3
Real Zamora	0

== Matches ==
=== Round of 32 ===
The matches were played on 21 and 22 January 2025.

Team 1	Score	Team 2
Delfines de Coatzacoalcos	1–0	Deportiva Venados TDP
Delfines UGM	0–1	Cañoneros
Muxes	1–0	Huracanes Izcalli
Ecatepec (p)	2–2 (4–3)	Dragones de Oaxaca
Héroes de Zaci (p)	0–0 (3–1)	Cordobés
Artesanos Metepec TDP	1–0	Artesanos Metepec
Bombarderos de Tecámac	0–0 (4–5)	(p) Ciervos
Tigres Yautepec	3–2	CDM
Titanes de Querétaro	0–3	Atlético Pachuca
Orgullo Surtam	0–1	Poza Rica
Deportivo Zamora	1–1 (2–4)	(p) Real Zamora
Tapatíos Soccer	2–0	Ayense
PFC Potosinos	2–2 (2–4)	(p) Calor
Cadereyta	1–1 (2–3)	(p) Santiago
Tigres de Álica TDP	2–0	Etchojoa
Guerreros de Autlán	2–0	Fundadores

Matches

21 January 2025	Muxes	1–0	Huracanes Izcalli	Mexico City
10:30 CST (UTC−6)	Hernández 88'	Report		Stadium: Deportivo Lázaro Cárdenas; Referee: Edson Enrique Castañón Ramírez

21 January 2025	Héroes de Zaci	1–1 (3–1 p)	Cordobés	Toluca, State of Mexico
11:00 CST (UTC−6)	Román 90'	Report	De la Rosa 45'	Stadium: Instalaciones FMF; Attendance: 0 Referee: Ximena Márquez Ruíz

21 January 2025	Ecatepec	2–2 (4–3 p)	Dragones de Oaxaca	Ecatepec, State of Mexico
12:00 CST (UTC−6)	Martínez 65'; Granados 83'	Report	Alva 67'; González 86'	Stadium: Estadio Guadalupe Victoria; Attendance: 100; Referee: José Carlos Meléndez Cansino

21 January 2025	Artesanos Metepec TDP	1–0	Artesanos Metepec	Metepec, State of Mexico
12:00 CST (UTC−6)		Report		Stadium: Unidad Deportiva Alarcón Hisojo

21 January 2025	Delfines UGM	0–1	Cañoneros	Nogales, Veracruz
15:00 CST (UTC−6)		Report	Tlaxcalteco 67'	Stadium: Estadio UGM; Attendance: 200; Referee: Brayan Daniel Escobar Hernández

21 January 2025	Bombarderos de Tecámac	0-0 (4–5 p)	Ciervos	Tecámac, State of Mexico
15:30 CST (UTC−6)		Report		Stadium: Deportivo Sierra Hermosa; Attendance: 100; Referee: Edwin Alejandro Marín Luna

21 January 2025	Titanes de Querétaro	0–3	Atlético Pachuca	San José Iturbide, Guanajuato
15:30 CST (UTC−6)		Report	González 36'; Godínez 42'; Navarro 86'	Stadium: Unidad Deportiva San José Iturbide; Attendance: 70; Referee: Yair Ugalde Rivera

21 January 2025	Tapatíos Soccer	2–0	Ayense	Zapopan, Jalisco
20:00 CST (UTC−6)	Cejas 73'; Mendoza 83'	Report		Stadium: Centro de Alto Rendimiento Tapatíos; Attendance: 150; Referee: Carlos Zohet Martínez Vega

21 January 2025	Deportivo Zamora	1–1 (2–4 p)	Real Zamora	Zamora, Michoacán
20:00 CST (UTC−6)	Cervantes 79'	Report	Ibarra 90'	Stadium: Unidad Deportiva El Chamizal; Attendance: 1,000; Referee: Jesús Octavio Lozuna Elizarraras

21 January 2025	Cadereyta	1–1 (2–3 p)	Santiago	Cadereyta, Nuevo León
20:00 CST (UTC−6)	Lira 21' (own)	Report	Morales 65'	Stadium: Estadio Clemente Salinas Netro; Attendance: 50; Referee: Antonio Jesús Villarreal Carlos

22 January 2025	PFC Potosinos	2–2 (2–4 p)	Calor	San Luis Potosí, SLP
10:00 CST (UTC−6)	De la Torre 21'; Rodríguez 84'	Report	Macías 11'; Cano 41'	Stadium: Unidad Deportiva Adolfo López Mateos; Attendance: 50; Referee: José Luis Hernández Ochoa

22 January 2025	Orgullo Surtam	0–1	Poza Rica	Tampico, Tamaulipas
15:00 CST (UTC−6)		Report	Núñez 24'	Stadium: Estadio Olímpico Ciudad Deportiva Tampico; Attendance: 250; Referee: Rolando Arturo Alcalá Ramírez

22 January 2025	Tigres de Álica TDP	2–0	Etchojoa	Tepic, Nayarit
16:00 MST (UTC−7)	García 7'; Anguiano 60'	Report		Stadium: Estadio Nicolás Álvarez Ortega; Attendance: 200; Referee: Ángel Azael Azamar Ponce

22 January 2025	Guerreros de Autlán	2–0	Fundadores	Autlán, Jalisco
16:00 CST (UTC−6)		Report		Stadium: Unidad Deportiva Chapultepec; Referee: Luigui Israel Casillas Lupercio

22 January 2025	Delfines de Coatzacoalcos	1–0	Deportiva Venados TDP	Coatzacoalcos, Veracruz
16:00 CST (UTC−6)	Aguilar 55'	Report		Stadium: Estadio Rafael Hernández Ochoa; Attendance: 1,200; Referee: Maximiliano Arias Guzmán

22 January 2025	Tigres Yautepec	3–2	CDM	Yautepec, Morelos
18:00 CST (UTC−6)		Report		Stadium: Campo Deportivo Yautepec; Referee: Julio Eduardo Candelas Ramírez

=== Round of 16 ===
The matches were played on 4 and 5 February 2025.

Team 1	Score	Team 2
Muxes	0–1	Tigres Yautepec
Ecatepec	2–1	Delfines de Coatzacoalcos
Héroes de Zaci	3–0	Artesanos Metepec TDP
Cañoneros (p)	0–0 (4–2)	Ciervos
Atlético Pachuca	1–1 (2–3)	(p) Real Zamora
Tapatíos Soccer	1–3	Calor
Santiago (p)	2–2 (7–6)	Poza Rica
Guerreros de Autlán	0–2	Tigres de Álica TDP

Matches

4 February 2025	Muxes	0–1	Tigres Yautepec	Mexico City
11:00 CST (UTC−6)		Report	Gil 63'	Stadium: Deportivo Lázaro Cárdenas; Attendance: 150; Referee: Francisco Pérez Toledano

4 February 2025	Ecatepec	2–1	Delfines de Coatzacoalcos	Ecatepec, State of Mexico
12:00 CST (UTC−6)	Granados 19'; Pérez 41'	Report	Pang 74'	Stadium: Estadio Guadalupe Victoria; Attendance: 100; Referee: Benjamín Zúñiga Antonio

4 February 2025	Cañoneros	0–0 (4–2 p)	Ciervos	Xalapa, Veracruz
12:00 CST (UTC−6)		Report		Stadium: Estadio Antonio M. Quirasco; Attendance: 100; Referee: Julio Eduardo Candelas Ramírez

4 February 2025	Atlético Pachuca	1–1 (2–3 p)	Real Zamora	Atitalaquía, Hidalgo
16:00 CST (UTC−6)	González 2'		Ávalos 34'	Stadium: Estadio Municipal; Attendance: 100; Referee: Andrés Benjamín Hernández Barraza

4 February 2025	Santiago	2–2 (7–6 p)	Poza Rica	Santiago, Nuevo León
19:00 CST (UTC−6)	Morales 15'; Rodríguez 82'	Report	González 73'; Melgarejo 84'	Stadium: Cancha FCD El Barrial; Attendance: 200; Referee: Alan Alejandro López Mancilla

4 February 2025	Tapatíos Soccer	1–3	Calor	Zapopan, Jalisco
20:00 CST (UTC−6)	I. González 79'	Report	J. González 28'; Borjas 73'; López 90'	Stadium: Centro de Alto Rendimiento Tapatíos; Attendance: 200; Referee: José Andrés Elías Zarzoza

5 February 2025	Héroes de Zaci	3–0	Artesanos Metepec TDP	Mexico City
11:00 CST (UTC−6)	Rodríguez 41'; Hernández 46'; Flores 52'	Report		Stadium: Deportivo Lázaro Cárdenas; Attendance: 80; Referee: Ángel Emmanuel Alzaga Esquivel

5 February 2025	Guerreros de Autlán	0–2	Tigres de Álica TDP	Autlán, Jalisco
16:00 CST (UTC−6)		Report	Durán 23'; Gómez 52'	Stadium: Unidad Deportiva Chapultepec; Attendance: 600; Referee: Carlos Zohet Martínez Vega

=== Quarter–finals ===
The matches were played on 18 and 19 February 2025.

Team 1	Score	Team 2
Ecatepec (p)	2–2 (12–11)	Tigres Yautepec
Héroes de Zaci	0–2	Real Zamora
Santiago	2–0	Cañoneros
Tigres de Álica TDP	1–1 (3–4)	(p) Calor

Matches

18 February 2025	Héroes de Zaci	0–2	Real Zamora	Mexico City
11:00 CST (UTC−6)		Report	Ávalos 16'; Medina 83'	Stadium: Deportivo Lázaro Cárdenas; Attendance: 150; Referee: Julio Eduardo Candelas Ramírez

18 February 2025	Ecatepec	2–2 (12–11 p)	Tigres Yautepec	Ecatepec, State of Mexico
16:00 CST (UTC−6)	Granados 28'; Zamora 72'	Report	López 59'; García 69'	Stadium: Estadio Guadalupe Victoria; Attendance: 200; Referee: Maximiliano Arias Guzmán

18 February 2025	Santiago	2–0	Cañoneros	Santiago, Nuevo León
19:00 CST (UTC−6)	Morales 48'; Ontiveros 90'	Report		Stadium: Cancha FCD El Barrial; Attendance: 50; Referee: Antonio Jesús Villarreal Carlos

19 February 2025	Tigres de Álica TDP	1–1 (3–4 p)	Calor	Tepic, Nayarit
16:00 MST (UTC−7)	Oviedo 90'	Report	Macías 50'	Stadium: Estadio Nicolás Álvarez Ortega; Attendance: 150; Referee: Alan Eduardo Contreras Sotelo

=== Semi–finals ===
The matches were played on 4 March 2025.

Team 1	Score	Team 2
Ecatepec	0–2	Santiago
Calor	1–1 (2–3)	(p) Real Zamora

Matches

4 March 2025	Calor	1–1 (2–3 p)	Real Zamora	San Juan de los Lagos, Jalisco
15:00 CST (UTC−6)	Vargas 41'	Report	Cano 26'	Stadium: Estadio Antonio R. Márquez; Attendance: 50; Referee: Irvin Aldair Acosta Urbina

4 March 2025	Ecatepec	0–2	Santiago	Ecatepec, State of Mexico
16:00 CST (UTC−6)		Report	Solís 15'; Sánchez 33'	Stadium: Estadio Guadalupe Victoria; Attendance: 500; Referee: Julio Eduardo Candelas Ramírez

=== Final ===
The match was played on 18 March 2025.

Team 1	Score	Team 2
Santiago	3–0	Real Zamora

Match

18 March 2025	Santiago	3–0	Real Zamora	Allende, Nuevo León
19:00 CST (UTC−6)	Morales 21'; Sánchez 31'; Uriarte 90+4'			Stadium: La Capilla Soccer Park; Attendance: 700; Referee: Maximiliano Arias Guzmán

2025 winners

1st title

== See also ==
- 2024–25 Serie B de México season
- 2024–25 Liga TDP season
