= Primera Premier =

- Organising body: Mexican Football Federation
- Founded: 1 August 2026; 3 months ago
- Country: Mexico
- Number of clubs: 18 (2 groups)
- Level on pyramid: 3
- Promotion to: Liga de Expansión MX
- Relegation to: Premier A
- Website: Official website
- Current: 2026–27 Primera Premier season

Primera Premier is a professional association football league in Mexico, part of the Liga Premier as the major subdivision in the third level of the Mexican football league system. The league is contested by 18 participating clubs with the best economic and sporting infrastructure, divided into two groups by geographic location (each group with 9 clubs). The champions are decided by a final knockout phase. The winners of Primera Premier are crowned champions of the Liga Premier and aspire for promotion to Liga de Expansión MX, if they meet all infrastructure and economic stability requirements.

== History ==
In the summer of 2026, the media began reporting that the Liga Premier and the Mexican Football Federation were planning to create a new branch of the league for clubs with the best conditions to qualify for promotion to the Liga de Expansión MX, because, in previous editions of the Liga Premier Serie A, it had become common for the division's champions to be unable to win promotion due to a failure to meet the requirements for the second tier; this resulted in the promotion of the respective seasons' runners-up, who lacked the sporting merit typically required for promotion, thereby necessitating a reform to ensure that only teams meeting the necessary criteria could be promoted.

The new major subdivision of the Liga Premier was created on 1 August 2026, with 18 founding clubs: Atlético Celaya, Chapulineros de Oaxaca, Cordobés, Deportiva Venados, Inter Playa del Carmen, Irapuato, Jaguares, La Piedad, Lobos ULMX, Los Cabos United, Montañeses, Pioneros de Cancún, Purépechas, Racing de Veracruz, Tapachula Soconusco, Tigres de Álica, Tritones Vallarta and Zacatepec.

== Stadiums and locations ==
=== 2026–27 season ===
The 2026–27 Primera Premier season has the following 18 participating clubs.

Locations of Primera Premier clubs in the 2026–27 season.
Group 1
Group 2

=== Group 1 ===
Club	Manager	City	Stadium	Capacity
Cordobés	(Mexico) Alejandro Estrada	Cuautitlán	Los Pinos	5,000
Irapuato	(Uruguay) Luis Almada	Irapuato	Sergio León Chávez	25,000
La Piedad	(Mexico) Gastón Obledo	La Piedad	Juan N. López	13,356
Lobos ULMX	(Colombia) Wilder Mosquera	Celaya	Miguel Alemán Valdés	23,182
Los Cabos United	(Mexico) Edson Alvarado	Los Cabos	Complejo Don Koll	3,500
Purépechas	(Mexico) Efrén Galván	Morelia	Venustiano Carranza	17,600
Tigres de Álica	(Mexico) Irving Rubirosa	Tepic	Nicolás Álvarez Ortega	12,495
Tritones Vallarta	(Mexico) Ricardo Jiménez	Puerto Vallarta	TBA (Note: The team played the first two months of the season at Estadio Juan N. López in La Piedad, Michoacán, however in November 2026 they moved to the Cancha Municipal in Tomatlán, Jalisco, due to the construction of the new Tritones stadium in Puerto Vallarta)	TBA
Zacatepec	(Mexico) Rowan Vargas	Xochitepec	Mariano Matamoros	16,000

=== Group 2 ===
Club	Manager	City	Stadium	Capacity
Atlético Celaya	(Mexico) Luis Fernando Soto	Celaya	Miguel Alemán Valdés	23,182
Chapulineros de Oaxaca	(Mexico) Carlos Ayala	San Jerónimo Tlacochahuaya	Independiente MRCI	6,000
Deportiva Venados	(Mexico) Alfredo García Salmones	Tamanché	Alonso Diego Molina	2,500
Inter Playa del Carmen	(Mexico) José Luis Trejo	Playa del Carmen	Unidad Deportiva Mario Villanueva Madrid	7,500
Jaguares	(Peru) Jorge Espejo	Tuxtla Gutiérrez	Víctor Manuel Reyna	29,001
Montañeses	(Mexico) Víctor Medina	Orizaba	Socum	7,000
Pioneros de Cancún	(Mexico) Gerardo Castillo	Cancún	Cancún 86	6,390
Racing de Veracruz	(Mexico) Héctor Altamirano	San Juan Bautista Tuxtepec	Gustavo Pacheco Villaseñor (Note: Provisional stadium due to the closure of its stadium in Veracruz.)	15,000
Tapachula Soconusco	(Mexico) Diego Mazariegos	Tapachula	Olímpico de Tapachula	18,017

== Changes ==
=== Offseason ===
- On 27 June 2026, Irapuato returned to the Liga Premier after a year in the Liga de Expansión, as the club was forced to start a new project following the conflict between the civil association that owns the name and brand rights and the company that owned the club between 2023 and 2026.
- On 23 July 2026, Celaya F.C. was dissolved to grant its franchise in the Liga Premier to the refounding of Atlético Celaya.
- On 1 August 2026, Atlético Celaya, Chapulineros de Oaxaca, Cordobés, Deportiva Venados, Inter Playa del Carmen, Jaguares, La Piedad, Lobos ULMX, Los Cabos United, Montañeses, Pioneros de Cancún, Racing de Veracruz, Tapachula, Tigres de Álica, Tritones Vallarta and Zacatepec were promoted from Liga Premier A as the teams in that branch have the best conditions to qualify for promotion to Liga de Expansión MX.
- On 10 August 2026, H2O Purépechas joined the league taking the place of Halcones F.C., which had been announced as a founding club of the league. On 27 August the team was renamed Purépechas F.C.
- On 14 August 2026, Racing de Veracruz was relocated from Boca del Río, Veracruz to San Juan Bautista Tuxtepec, Oaxaca because the club was left without a stadium in Veracruz following the closure of the Unidad Deportiva Hugo Sánchez in February 2026.
- On 18 August 2026, Tritones Vallarta was temporarily relocated to La Piedad, Michoacán, due to the construction of its new stadium in Puerto Vallarta.

=== Onseason ===
- On 28 October 2026, Tritones Vallarta was relocated from La Piedad to Tomatlán, Jalisco, due to logistical reasons and the fact that this location is closer to the club’s city, pending the completion of the team’s new stadium in Puerto Vallarta.

== See also ==
- Sport in Mexico
- Football in Mexico
- Mexican football league system
- Mexican Football Federation
- Liga Premier
- Liga Premier A
- Liga Premier B
- Copa Conecta
- Copa Promesas MX
