= 2024 Copa Promesas MX =

Tournament details
- Country: Mexico
- Dates: 27 July 2024 – 20 August 2024
- Teams: 64

Final positions
- Champions: Halcones (1st title)
- Runners-up: Santiago

Tournament statistics
- Matches played: 96
- Goals scored: 260 (2.71 per match)
- Top goal scorer(s): Dayon Chávez (5 goals)

The 2024 Copa Promesas MX was the 1st edition of the Copa Promesas MX, a cup competition for Mexican football clubs from Liga MX U–19, Liga Premier and Liga TDP.

The Copa Promesas MX is an official Mexican tournament that was created in 2024 with the aim of providing a greater opportunity for development to the soccer players of the Liga MX Sub–19, Liga Premier and Liga TDP teams.

== Qualified teams ==
18 Liga MX U–19 teams

- América U–19
- Atlas U–19
- Atlético San Luis U–19
- Cruz Azul U–19
- Guadalajara U–19
- Juárez U–19
- Mazatlán U–19
- Monterrey U–19
- Necaxa U–19
- Pachuca U–19
- Puebla U–19
- Querétaro U–19
- Santos Laguna U–19
- Tijuana U–19
- Toluca U–19
- UANL U–19
- UNAM U–19

13 Liga Premier teams

- Atlético Aragón
- Atlético Pachuca
- Calor
- Cordobés
- Halcones
- Leones Negros UdeG Premier
- Mexicali
- Racing de Veracruz
- Santiago
- Tecos
- Tigres de Álica
- Zacatepec
- Zitácuaro

33 Liga TDP teams

- Acatlán TDP
- Arietes
- Artesanos Metepec TDP
- Atlético Leonés
- Atlético Tijuana
- Bombarderos de Tecámac
- Cachanillas
- Cadereyta
- CEPROFFA
- Cobras Futbol Premier
- Delfines UGM
- Diablos Tesistán
- Dorados de Sinaloa TDP
- Ecatepec
- Gorilas de Juanacatlán
- Héroes de Zaci
- Hidalguense
- Inter de Querétaro (franchise loan from Querétaro 3D)
- Irritilas
- La Tribu de Ciudad Juárez
- Licántropos
- Mineros Querétaro
- Muxes
- Nuevo León
- Oceanía
- Orishas Tepeji
- Pabellón
- Potosinos
- San Isidro Laguna
- Tapatíos Soccer
- Tigres Yautepec (franchise loan from Atlético Cuernavaca)
- Titanes de Querétaro
- Xalisco

== Group stage ==
Each team will play three games against the same number of rivals. The matches will be played between July 27 and August 3, 2024.

=== Group 1 ===
Pos	Team	Pld	W	D	L	GF	GA	GD	Pts	Promotion	LTJ	CEP	JUA	COB
1	La Tribu de Ciudad Juárez	3	2	1	0	9	1	+8	7	Qualified to Final Stage		2–1	0–0	7–0
2	CEPROFFA	3	1	1	1	2	2	0	5				1–0	0–0
3	Juárez U–19	3	1	1	1	1	1	0	5					
4	Cobras Futbol Premier	3	0	1	2	0	8	−8	1				0–1	

Updated to match(es) played on 2 August 2024. Source: Copa Promesas MX
Rules for classification: 1st points; 2nd goal difference; 3rd number of goals scored; 4th number of goals scored as away team; 5th head-to-head points; 6th Fair Play; 7th Draw

=== Group 2 ===
Pos	Team	Pld	W	D	L	GF	GA	GD	Pts	Promotion	SAN	UNL	CAD	MTY
1	Santiago	3	2	1	0	5	2	+3	7	Qualified to Final Stage		2–2		2–0
2	UANL U–19	3	1	1	1	4	4	0	5					0–2
3	Cadereyta	3	1	0	2	3	4	−1	3		0–1	0–2		3–1
4	Monterrey U–19	3	1	0	2	3	5	−2	3					

Updated to match(es) played on 30 July 2024. Source: Copa Promesas MX
Rules for classification: 1st points; 2nd goal difference; 3rd number of goals scored; 4th number of goals scored as away team; 5th head-to-head points; 6th Fair Play; 7th Draw

=== Group 3 ===
Pos	Team	Pld	W	D	L	GF	GA	GD	Pts	Promotion	SAN	NVL	IRI	SAI
1	Santos Laguna U–19	3	3	0	0	9	2	+7	9	Qualified to Final Stage				
2	Nuevo León	3	2	0	1	3	4	−1	6		0–4		1–0	2–0
3	Irritilas	3	1	0	2	3	3	0	3		0–2			3–0
4	San Isidro Laguna	3	0	0	3	2	8	−6	0		2–3			

Updated to match(es) played on 2 August 2024. Source: Copa Promesas MX
Rules for classification: 1st points; 2nd goal difference; 3rd number of goals scored; 4th goals scored as away team; 5th head-to-head points; 6th Fair Play; 7th Draw

=== Group 4 ===
Pos	Team	Pld	W	D	L	GF	GA	GD	Pts	Promotion	NEC	ASL	POT	PAB
1	Necaxa U–19	3	2	1	0	6	1	+5	8	Qualified to Final Stage				
2	Atlético San Luis U–19	3	1	1	1	4	4	0	5		0–1			
3	Potosinos	3	1	1	1	7	4	+3	4		1–1	2–3		4–0
4	Pabellón	3	0	1	2	1	9	−8	1		0–4	1–1		

Updated to match(es) played on 2 August 2024. Source: Copa Promesas MX
Rules for classification: 1st points; 2nd goal difference; 3rd number of goals scored; 4th number of goals scored as away team; 5th head-to-head points; 6th Fair Play; 7th Draw

=== Group 5 ===
Pos	Team	Pld	W	D	L	GF	GA	GD	Pts	Promotion	TIJ	ATJ	MXL	CAC
1	Tijuana U–19	3	3	0	0	10	1	+9	9	Qualified to Final Stage				
2	Atlético Tijuana	3	1	1	1	2	3	−1	5		0–2		2–1	0–0
3	Mexicali	3	1	0	2	5	7	−2	3		1–3			
4	Cachanillas	3	0	1	2	2	8	−6	1		0–5		2–3	

Updated to match(es) played on 2 August 2024. Source: Copa Promesas MX
Rules for classification: 1st points; 2nd goal difference; 3rd number of goals scored; 4th number of goals scored as away team; 5th head-to-head points; 6th Fair Play; 7th Draw

=== Group 6 ===
Pos	Team	Pld	W	D	L	GF	GA	GD	Pts	Promotion	MAZ	DOR	XAL	TIG
1	Mazatlán U–19	3	3	0	0	6	0	+6	9	Qualified to Final Stage				
2	Dorados TDP	3	1	1	1	4	5	−1	5		0–2			3–2
3	Xalisco	3	0	2	1	2	3	−1	3		0–1	1–1		1–1
4	Tigres de Álica	3	0	1	2	3	7	−4	1		0–3			

Updated to match(es) played on 2 August 2024. Source: Copa Promesas MX
Rules for classification: 1st points; 2nd goal difference; 3rd number of goals scored; 4th number of goals scored as away team; 5th head-to-head points; 6th Fair Play; 7th Draw

=== Group 7 ===
Pos	Team	Pld	W	D	L	GF	GA	GD	Pts	Promotion	DIA	UDG	GDL	ACA
1	Diablos Tesistán	3	2	0	1	4	1	+3	6	Qualified to Final Stage		0–1	3–0	1–0
2	Leones Negros Premier	3	2	0	1	4	3	+1	6				0–2	
3	Guadalajara U–19	3	1	1	1	2	3	−1	5					
4	Acatlán TDP	3	0	1	2	1	4	−3	1			1–3	0–0	

Updated to match(es) played on 2 August 2024. Source: Copa Promesas MX
Rules for classification: 1st points; 2nd goal difference; 3rd number of goals scored; 4th number of goals scored as away team; 5th head-to-head points; 6th Fair Play; 7th Draw

=== Group 8 ===
Pos	Team	Pld	W	D	L	GF	GA	GD	Pts	Promotion	ATL	TAP	GOR	TEC
1	Atlas U–19	3	2	1	0	5	2	+3	7	Qualified to Final Stage				
2	Tapatíos Soccer	3	2	0	1	3	2	+1	6		0–2			1–0
3	Gorilas de Juanacatlán	3	0	2	1	4	6	−2	4		2–2	0–2		2–2
4	Tecos	3	0	1	2	2	4	−2	1		0–1			

Updated to match(es) played on 2 August 2024. Source: Copa Promesas MX
Rules for classification: 1st points; 2nd goal difference; 3rd number of goals scored; 4th number of goals scored as away team; 5th head-to-head points; 6th Fair Play; 7th Draw

=== Group 9 ===
Pos	Team	Pld	W	D	L	GF	GA	GD	Pts	Promotion	LEO	ATL	CAL	IQR
1	León U–19	3	2	1	0	2	0	+2	7	Qualified to Final Stage				
2	Atlético Leonés	3	2	0	1	3	1	+2	6		0–1		1–0	
3	Calor	3	1	1	1	5	2	+3	5		0–0			
4	Inter Querétaro	3	0	0	3	1	8	−7	0		0–1	0–2	1–5	

Updated to match(es) played on 2 August 2024. Source: Copa Promesas MX
Rules for classification: 1st points; 2nd goal difference; 3rd number of goals scored; 4th number of goals scored as away team; 5th head-to-head points; 6th Fair Play; 7th Draw

=== Group 10 ===
Pos	Team	Pld	W	D	L	GF	GA	GD	Pts	Promotion	HAL	QRO	TIT	MIN
1	Halcones	3	3	0	0	10	1	+9	9	Qualified to Final Stage		2–1		7–0
2	Querétaro U–19	3	2	0	1	12	2	+10	6					
3	Titanes de Querétaro	3	1	0	2	5	4	+1	3		0–1	0–2		
4	Mineros Querétaro	3	0	0	3	1	21	−20	0			0–9	1–5	

Updated to match(es) played on 2 August 2024. Source: Copa Promesas MX
Rules for classification: 1st points; 2nd goal difference; 3rd number of goals scored; 4th number of goals scored as away team; 5th head-to-head points; 6th Fair Play; 7th Draw

=== Group 11 ===
Pos	Team	Pld	W	D	L	GF	GA	GD	Pts	Promotion	DEL	RAC	PUE	LIC
1	Delfines UGM	3	1	2	0	3	2	+1	7	Qualified to Final Stage		2–1	1–1	0–0
2	Racing de Veracruz	3	2	0	1	4	2	+2	6				1–0	
3	Puebla U–19	3	0	2	1	3	4	−1	3					
4	Licántropos	3	0	2	1	2	4	−2	2			0–2	2–2	

Updated to match(es) played on 3 August 2024. Source: Copa Promesas MX
Rules for classification: 1st points; 2nd goal difference; 3rd number of goals scored; 4th number of goals scored as away team; 5th head-to-head points; 6th Fair Play; 7th Draw

=== Group 12 ===
Pos	Team	Pld	W	D	L	GF	GA	GD	Pts	Promotion	PAC	ATP	BOM	HID
1	Pachuca U–19	3	2	1	0	11	4	+7	8	Qualified to Final Stage				
2	Atlético Pachuca	3	2	0	1	5	6	−1	6		3–6			
3	Bombarderos de Tecámac	3	0	2	1	3	4	−1	2		1–1	0–1		0–0
4	Hidalguense	3	0	1	2	2	7	−5	2		0–4	0–1		

Updated to match(es) played on 2 August 2024. Source: Copa Promesas MX
Rules for classification: 1st points; 2nd goal difference; 3rd number of goals scored; 4th number of goals scored as away team; 5th head-to-head points; 6th Fair Play; 7th Draw

=== Group 13 ===
Pos	Team	Pld	W	D	L	GF	GA	GD	Pts	Promotion	TOL	ZIT	ART	ORI
1	Toluca U–19	3	3	0	0	8	4	+4	9	Qualified to Final Stage				
2	Zitácuaro	3	2	0	1	8	4	+4	6		3–4			
3	Artesanos Metepec TDP	3	1	0	2	4	4	0	3		0–1	0–2		4–1
4	Orishas Tepeji	3	0	0	3	2	10	−8	0		1–3	0–3		

Updated to match(es) played on 3 August 2024. Source: Copa Promesas MX
Rules for classification: 1st points; 2nd goal difference; 3rd number of goals scored; 4th number of goals scored as away team; 5th head-to-head points; 6th Fair Play; 7th Draw

=== Group 14 ===
Pos	Team	Pld	W	D	L	GF	GA	GD	Pts	Promotion	ARA	AME	MUX	HER
1	Atlético Aragón	3	3	0	0	4	0	+4	9	Qualified to Final Stage		1–0		
2	América U–19	3	2	0	1	5	2	+3	6					
3	Muxes	3	1	0	2	3	5	−2	3		0–1	1–4		2–0
4	Héroes de Zaci	3	0	0	3	0	5	−5	0		0–2	0–1		

Updated to match(es) played on 2 August 2024. Source: Copa Promesas MX
Rules for classification: 1st points; 2nd goal difference; 3rd number of goals scored; 4th number of goals scored as away team; 5th head-to-head points; 6th Fair Play; 7th Draw

=== Group 15 ===
Pos	Team	Pld	W	D	L	GF	GA	GD	Pts	Promotion	CRZ	ECA	COR	OCE
1	Cruz Azul U–19	3	2	1	0	2	0	+2	7	Qualified to Final Stage				
2	Ecatepec	3	2	0	1	3	2	+1	6		0–1		1–0	
3	Cordobés	3	0	2	1	0	1	−1	4		0–0			
4	Oceanía	3	0	1	2	1	3	−2	1		0–1	1–2	0–0	

Updated to match(es) played on 2 August 2024. Source: Copa Promesas MX
Rules for classification: 1st points; 2nd goal difference; 3rd number of goals scored; 4th number of goals scored as away team; 5th head-to-head points; 6th Fair Play; 7th Draw

=== Group 16 ===
Pos	Team	Pld	W	D	L	GF	GA	GD	Pts	Promotion	ZAC	TIG	UNM	ARI
1	Zacatepec	3	2	1	0	7	1	+6	7	Qualified to Final Stage			1–0	
2	Tigres Yautepec	3	1	2	0	4	2	+2	7		0–0		1–1	3–1
3	UNAM U–19	3	1	1	1	9	4	+5	4					
4	Arietes	3	0	0	3	4	17	−13	0		1–6		2–8	

Updated to match(es) played on 2 August 2024. Source: Copa Promesas MX
Rules for classification: 1st points; 2nd goal difference; 3rd number of goals scored; 4th number of goals scored as away team; 5th head-to-head points; 6th Fair Play; 7th Draw

== Final Stage ==
The 16 winners of each group will qualify for the final stage. The round of 16, quarter–finals, semi–finals and final will be played during this stage.

=== Round of 16 ===
The matches were played on August 6 and 7, 2024.

Team 1	Score	Team 2
La Tribu de Ciudad Juárez	3–3 (4–5) (p)	Santos Laguna U–19
Santiago	2–0	Necaxa U–19
Tijuana U–19	1–2	Mazatlán U–19
Diablos Tesistán	1–1 (1–4) (p)	Atlas U–19
Halcones	1–0	León U–19
Atlético Aragón	1–1 (2–3) (p)	Toluca U–19
Delfines UGM	1–0	Cruz Azul U–19
Zacatepec	0–1 (Note: The match was awarded to Pachuca U–19 due to an improper lineup by Zacatepec. The match originally ended with a score of 1–0.)	Pachuca U–19

Matches

6 August 2024	Tijuana U–19	1–2	Mazatlán U–19	Tijuana, Baja California
9:00 PDT (UTC−7)	Hernández 89'	Report	Ávila 59'; Gutiérrez 69'	Stadium: Instalaciones Club Tijuana; Referee: José Manuel Guillén Guerra

6 August 2024	La Tribu de Ciudad Juárez	3–3 (4–5 p)	Santos Laguna U–19	Ciudad Juárez, Chihuahua
10:00 MDT (UTC−6)	Martínez 1'; Parra 15', 66'	Report	Mascareño 18', 56'; Sifuentes 60'	Stadium: Complejo Deportivo La Tribu; Referee: Ángel Efrén Sotelo Centeno

6 August 2024	Atlético Aragón	1–1 (2–3 p)	Toluca U–19	Cuautitlán, State of Mexico
12:00 CST (UTC−6)	Flores 87'	Report	Virgen 17'	Stadium: Estadio Los Pinos; Referee: Oscar Yair Toledo Pineda

6 August 2024	Delfines UGM	1–0	Cruz Azul U–19	Nogales, Veracruz
15:00 CST (UTC−6)	Cancino 90'	Report		Stadium: Estadio UGM; Referee: Andrés Benjamín Hernández Barraza

6 August 2024	Diablos Tesistán	1–1 (1–4 p)	Atlas U–19	Tesistán, Jalisco
16:00 CST (UTC−6)		Report		Stadium: Club Diablos Tesistán; Referee: José Andrés Elías Zarzoza

6 August 2024	Zacatepec	0–1	Pachuca U–19	Zacatepec, Morelos
17:00 CST (UTC−6)	Estrada 50'	Report		Stadium: Estadio Agustín "Coruco" Díaz; Referee: José Carlos Meléndez Cansino

6 August 2024	Santiago	2–0	Necaxa U–19	Santiago, Nuevo León
19:00 CST (UTC−6)	Ontiveros 18', 59'	Report		Stadium: Cancha FCD El Barrial; Referee: Irvin Aldair Acosta Urbina

7 August 2024	Halcones	1–0	León U–19	Querétaro City, Querétaro
16:00 CST (UTC−6)	Padilla 55'	Report		Stadium: Estadio Olímpico Alameda; Referee: Luigui Israel Casillas Lupercio

=== Quarter–finals ===
The matches will be played on August 10 and 11, 2024.

Team 1	Score	Team 2
Santiago	2–1	Santos Laguna U–19
Mazatlán U–19	0–2	Atlas U–19
Delfines UGM	0–1	Halcones
Toluca U–19	3–3 (p)	Pachuca U–19

Matches

10 August 2024	Mazatlán U–19	0–2	Atlas U–19	Mazatlán, Sinaloa
10:00 MST (UTC−7)		Report	Gómez 45'; Gaytán 56'	Stadium: Estadio El Encanto; Referee: Luis Antonio Ayala Ceniceros

10 August 2024	Delfines UGM	0–1	Halcones	Nogales, Veracruz
13:00 CST (UTC−6)		Report	Torres 52'	Stadium: Estadio UGM; Referee: Octavio Paúl Macías Velázquez

10 August 2024	Santiago	2–1	Santos Laguna U–19	Santiago, Nuevo León
19:00 CST (UTC−6)	Sánchez 45'; Quiroz 84'	Report	De Luna 40'	Stadium: Cancha FCD El Barrial; Referee: Rolando Arturo Alcalá Ramírez

11 August 2024	Toluca U–19	3–3	Pachuca U–19	Metepec, State of Mexico
9:00 CST (UTC−6)	Orta 74'; Moreno 77'; Torres 86'	Report	Méndez 43'; Lara 63'; Molina 90'	Stadium: Instalaciones de Metepec Field 6 Referee: Rogelio Sergio Arellano Corona

=== Semi–finals ===
The matches will be played on August 14, 2024.

Team 1	Score	Team 2
Santiago	2–1	Atlas U–19
Halcones	(p) 0–0 (4–3)	Pachuca U–19

Matches

14 August 2024	Santiago	2–1	Atlas U–19	Santiago, Nuevo León
19:00 CST (UTC−6)	Sánchez 18'; Quiroz 89'	Report	Gómez 50'	Stadium: Cancha FCD El Barrial; Referee: Irvin Aldair Acosta Urbina

14 August 2024	Halcones	0–0 (4–3 p)	Pachuca U–19	Querétaro City, Querétaro
19:00 CST (UTC−6)		Report		Stadium: Estadio Olímpico Alameda; Referee: Francisco Pérez Toledano

=== Final ===
The match will be played on August 20, 2024

Team 1	Score	Team 2
Santiago	0–0 (3–4) (p)	Halcones

20 August 2024	Santiago	0–0 (3–4 p)	Halcones	Toluca, State of Mexico
11:00 CST (UTC−6)		Report		Stadium: Instalaciones de la Casa del Fútbol; Referee: Víctor Alfonso Cáceres Hernández

2024 winners
Halcones
1st title
