= 2024–25 Serie B de México season =

Serie B de México
- Season: 2024–25
- Champions: Apertura 2024: Santiago (1st title); Clausura 2025: Santiago (2nd title)
- Matches: 156
- Goals: 444 (2.85 per match)
- Top goalscorer: Apertura 2024: Juan José González (10 goals); Clausura 2025: Juan José González (9 goals)
- Biggest home win: Apertura 2024: Atlético Pachuca 5–1 Ayense (1 November 2024); Clausura 2025: Huracanes Izcalli 7–1 Caja Oblatos (5 April 2025)
- Biggest away win: Apertura 2024: Ciervos 0–6 CDM (23 November 2024); Clausura 2025: Ciervos 1–7 Atlético Pachuca (5 April 2025)
- Highest scoring: Apertura 2024:Atlético Pachuca 5–1 Ayense (18 October 2024) (1 November 2024); Ciervos 0–6 CDM (23 November 2024); Clausura 2025: Caja Oblatos 3–5 Cordobés (30 March 2025)
- Longest winning run: Apertura 2024: 5 matches Real Zamora; Clausura 2025: 5 matches Santiago
- Longest unbeaten run: Apertura 2024: 5 matches Real Zamora; Clausura 2025: 8 matches Cordobés
- Longest winless run: Apertura 2024: 12 matches Caja Oblatos; Clausura 2025: 7 matches Ciervos
- Longest losing run: Apertura 2024: 7 matches Caja Oblatos; Clausura 2025: 5 matches Ciervos
- Highest attendance: Apertura 2024: 1,500; Cañoneros vs Calor (14 October 2024); Clausura 2025: 2,000; Poza Rica vs Cañoneros (17 January 2025)
- Lowest attendance: Apertura 2024: 30; Calor vs Santiago (16 November 2024); Clausura 2025: 30; Real Zamora vs Cordobés (31 January 2025)
- Total attendance: Apertura 2024: 17,714; Clausura 2025: 19,010
- Average attendance: Apertura 2024: 230; Clausura 2025: 244
- Stats are from the regular season only

The 2024–25 Serie B de México season is part of the third-tier football league of Mexico. The tournament began on 6 September 2024 and finished on 4 May 2025.

== Offseason changes ==
- On May 11, 2024 Aguacateros CDU was promoted to Serie A.
- On May 26, 2024 Yautepec was promoted to Serie B from Liga TDP. On September 5, 2024 the team went on hiatus due to financial problems.
- On June 28, 2024 C.D. Avispones de Chilpancingo was promoted to Serie A as an expansion team.
- On June 28, 2024 Cordobés joined the league as an expansion team.
- On June 28, 2024 Calor and Saltillo were relocated to Serie B from Serie A.
- On June 28, 2024 Dongu was put on hiatus.
- On June 28, 2024, the league format was modified, the two tournaments per season were reinstated after one year with a single-season tournament.
- On June 28, 2024 Real Zamora rejoined the league after Inter de Querétaro returned the franchise rights. On July 24 the team was relocated to Serie B. On August 20, 2024, the team was moved to La Piedad.
- On July 15, 2024 Cañoneros was relocated from Mexico City to Xalapa.
- On July 24, 2024 Zitácuaro was promoted to Serie A as an expansion team.
- On August 20, 2024 Chilangos and Saltillo were put on hiatus.
- On August 20, 2024 Club Calor was relocated to San Juan de los Lagos, Jalisco.

=== In–season changes ===
Apertura Tournament

- Since Week 8 Santiago F.C. was relocated from Santiago to Allende, Nuevo León.

Clausura Tournament

- Since Week 7 Real Zamora was relocated from La Piedad to Toluca.
- Since Week 9 Caja Oblatos was relocated from Zapotlanejo to Tonalá due to remodeling work at its original stadium.

== Teams ==
Below are listed the member clubs of the Serie B for the 2024–25 season.

Location of teams in the 2024–25 Serie B

Club	Manager	City	Stadium	Capacity	Affiliate
Artesanos Metepec	(Mexico) Juan Carlos Pedroza	Metepec, State of Mexico	Unidad Deportiva Alarcón Hisojo	2,000	–
Atlético Pachuca (Note: Franchise loan from Pachuca Premier)	(Mexico) Fausto Pinto	Atitalaquía, Hidalgo	Municipal de Atitalaquia	3,000	Pachuca
Ayense	(Mexico) Ismael Ávila	Ayotlán, Jalisco	Chino Rivas	3,500	–
Caja Oblatos	(Mexico) Sebastián Rivera	Tonalá, Jalisco	Unidad Deportiva Revolución Mexicana	3,000	–
Calor	(Mexico) Víctor Hugo Gómez	San Juan de los Lagos, Jalisco	Antonio R. Márquez	1,000	–
Cañoneros	(Mexico) Carlos Cazarín	Xalapa, Veracruz	Antonio M. Quirasco	2,000	–
CDM	(Mexico) Emmanuel Sánchez	Xochimilco, Mexico City	Valentín González	2,500	–
Ciervos	(Mexico) Arturo Viche	Chalco de Díaz Covarrubias, State of Mexico	Roberto González Velásquez	3,217	–
Cordobés	(Mexico) Francisco Flores	Huixquilucan, State of Mexico	Alberto Pérez Navarro	3,000	–
Huracanes Izcalli	(Mexico) Jonathan Escobar	Cuautitlán Izcalli, State of Mexico	Los Pinos	5,000	–
Poza Rica	(Mexico) Enrique Escudero	Poza Rica, Veracruz	Heriberto Jara Corona	10,000	–
Real Zamora	(Mexico) Edgar Martínez	Toluca, State of Mexico	Instalaciones FMF	1,000	–
Santiago	(Mexico) Martín Moreno	Allende, Nuevo León	La Capilla Soccer Park	1,000	–

== Torneo Apertura ==
=== Standings ===
Pos	Team	Pld	W	D	L	GF	GA	GD	BP	Pts	Qualification or relegation
1	Cordobés	12	9	0	3	17	11	+6	0	27	Qualification to Quarter–finals and Copa Conecta
2	Santiago (C)	12	8	2	2	20	6	+14	0	26	Qualification to Quarter–finals and Copa Conecta
3	Real Zamora (Note: The team was penalized with three points less for not complying with the rule related to the playing minutes of footballers born after 2006.)	12	8	2	2	21	15	+6	−2	24	Qualification to Quarter–finals and Copa Conecta
4	CDM	12	7	1	4	22	16	+6	1	23	Qualification to Quarter–finals and Copa Conecta
5	Artesanos Metepec	12	6	3	3	22	8	+14	1	22	Qualification to Quarter–finals and Copa Conecta
6	Cañoneros	12	6	2	4	15	10	+5	2	22	Qualification to Quarter–finals and Copa Conecta
7	Atlético Pachuca	12	6	1	5	26	19	+7	0	19	Qualification to Quarter–finals and Copa Conecta
8	Calor	12	5	2	5	14	14	0	2	19	Qualification to Quarter–finals and Copa Conecta
9	Poza Rica	12	5	1	6	17	18	−1	2	18	Qualification to Copa Conecta
10	Ayense	12	4	3	5	14	18	−4	0	15	Qualification to Copa Conecta
11	Huracanes Izcalli	12	2	2	8	5	18	−13	0	8	Qualification to Copa Conecta
12	Ciervos	12	1	1	10	5	28	−23	0	4	Qualification to Copa Conecta
13	Caja Oblatos	12	0	2	10	4	21	−17	0	2	

Updated to match(es) played on 1 December 2024. Source: Liga Premier FMF
(C) Champions

=== Positions by round ===
Leader and qualification to Liguilla quarter-finals
Qualification to quarter-finals
Last place in table

Team ╲ Round	1	2	3	4	5	6	7	8	9	10	11	12	13
Cordobés	3	3	5	6	6	5	6	5	3	6^{†}	3	2	1
Santiago	2	4	3	3	3	2	3	2	4	2	2	3^{†}	2
Real Zamora	5	2	2	1	1	1	1	1	1	1	1	1	3^{†}
CDM	4	6	7^{†}	5	5	6	4	6	2	3	5	4	4
Artesanos Metepec	10	10	6	8	8	8^{†}	9	9	9	8	8	7	5
Cañoneros	11	5	4	4	4	4	5^{†}	3	5	4	4	5	6
Atlético Pachuca	9	7	9	10^{†}	9	9	7	8	7	7	7	8	8
Calor	1	1	1	2	2^{†}	3	2	4	6	5	6	6	7
Poza Rica	8^{†}	12	8	9	10	11	11	11	11	10	10	10	9
Ayense	6	8	10	7	7	7	8	7	8^{†}	9	9	9	10
Huracanes Izcalli	7	9	11	12	12	10	10	10	10	11	11^{†}	11	11
Ciervos	12	11^{†}	12	11	11	12	12	12	12	12	12	12	12
Caja Oblatos	13	13	13	13	13	13	13	13^{†}	13	13	13	13	13

Updated to match(es) played on 1 December 2024. Source: Liga Premier FMF
Notes: † indicates team rested that round

=== Results ===
Home \ Away	ART	ATP	AYE	CAJ	CAL	CAÑ	CDM	CIE	COR	HUR	PZR	RZA	SAN
Artesanos Metepec	—	—	4–0	—	—	—	—	4–0	1–2	4–0	2–1	1–1	2–1
Atlético Pachuca	1–0	—	5–1	—	1–3	3–3	—	4–0	—	5–1	—	4–2	—
Ayense	—	—	—	—	3–0	0–1	1–1	—	1–2	—	3–1	—	1–1
Caja Oblatos	0–0	0–1	1–2	—	—	—	—	0–1	—	0–1	—	1–3	—
Calor	0–0	—	—	1–0	—	—	3–2	—	0–1	—	1–3	—	0–1
Cañoneros	1–0	—	—	1–1	1–0	—	0–1	—	0–1	—	4–1	—	0–1
CDM	1–4	2–1	—	2–0	—	—	—	—	2–1	—	1–4	—	2–0
Ciervos	—	—	0–1	—	1–4	1–3	0–6	—	—	0–0	—	1–2	—
Cordobés	—	2–1	—	3–0	—	—	—	1–0	—	1–0	—	1–2	—
Huracanes Izcalli	—	—	0–0	—	0–1	0–1	0–1	—	—	—	2–1	—	0–1
Poza Rica	—	1–0	—	3–1	—	—	—	1–0	1–2	—	—	—	0–0
Real Zamora	—	—	2–1	—	1–1	1–0	2–1	—	—	3–1	2–0	—	—
Santiago	—	4–0	—	3–0	—	—	—	2–1	3–0	—	—	3–0	—

Updated to match(es) played on 1 December 2024. Source: Liga Premier FMF
Legend: Blue = home team win; Yellow = draw; Red = away team win.

=== Regular season statistics ===
==== Top goalscorers ====
Players sorted first by goals scored, then by last name.

Rank	Player	Club	Goals
1	(Mexico) Juan José González	Atlético Pachuca	10
2	(Mexico) David Flores	Artesanos Metepec	9
3	(Mexico) Sergio Gallinar	Cañoneros	6
4	(Mexico) Enrique Ávalos	Real Zamora	5
4	(Mexico) César Delgado	Ayense	5
4	(Mexico) Josué Morales	Santiago	5
7	(Mexico) José Birche	Poza Rica	4
7	(Mexico) Omar Corona	Atlético Pachuca	4
7	(Mexico) Alexis López	Calor	4
7	(Mexico) Diego Márquez	CDM	4
7	(Mexico) Pedro Reyes	Poza Rica	4

Source:Liga Premier FMF

==== Hat-tricks ====
Player	For	Against	Result	Date	Round	Reference
(Mexico) Juan José González	Atlético Pachuca	Huracanes Izcalli	5 – 1 (H)	1 November 2024	9	
(Mexico) David Flores	Artesanos Metepec	Ayense	4 – 0 (H)	23 November 2024	12	
(Mexico) Juan José González	Atlético Pachuca	Ciervos	4 – 0 (H)	29 November 2024	13	

(H) – Home; (A) – Away

=== Attendance ===
==== Per team ====
Pos	Team	Total	High	Low	Average	Change
1	Poza Rica	4,500	1,000	700	900	+19.4%
2	Cañoneros	4,150	1,500	50	593	+1,247.7%^{4}
3	Ayense	2,239	500	259	373	−60.8%
4	Artesanos Metepec	1,450	350	100	207	−3.3%
5	CDM	730	200	50	122	−32.2%
6	Santiago	560	200	60	112	−44.6%
7	Cordobés	550	200	50	110	n/a^{2,6}
8	Caja Oblatos	650	200	50	108	−13.6%
9	Atlético Pachuca	730	200	80	104	−18.1%
10	Real Zamora	600	150	50	100	n/a^{3}
11	Huracanes Izcalli	480	100	80	96	+52.4%^{7}
12	Ciervos	570	150	50	95	+4.4%
13	Calor	485	105	30	81	−73.8%^{1,5}
	League total	17,714	1,100	50	230	−18.7%

Source: Liga Premier FMF
Notes:
Only regular season listed
1: Team played Liga Premier – Serie A last season.
2: Team played Liga TDP last season.
3: Team did not played last season.
4: Cañoneros played last season at Mexico City.
5: Calor played last season at Monclova, Coahuila.
6: The team played at least one match on an alternative field.
7: The team had at least one match canceled for administrative issues.

==== Highest and lowest ====
Highest attended					Lowest attended			
Week	Home	Score	Away	Attendance	Home	Score	Away	Attendance
1	Artesanos Metepec	1–2	Cordobés	250	CDM	2–1	Atlético Pachuca	80
2	Cañoneros	4–1	Poza Rica	1,100	Atlético Pachuca	1–0	Artesanos Metepec	80
3	Poza Rica	3–1	Caja Oblatos	1,000	Ciervos	1–3	Cañoneros	50
4	Ayense	3–1	Poza Rica	500	Calor	0–0	Artesanos Metepec	100
5	Poza Rica	1–2	Cordobés	800	Real Zamora	3–1	Huracanes Izcalli	50
6	Cañoneros	1–0	Calor	1,500	Caja Oblatos	0–1	Atlético Pachuca	50
7	Poza Rica	0–0	Santiago	1,000	Atlético Pachuca	5–1	Ayense	50
8	Ayense	3–0	Calor	300	Cordobés	2–1	Atlético Pachuca	50
9	Cañoneros	1–1	Caja Oblatos	500	CDM	2–0	Santiago	100
10	Poza Rica	1–0	Ciervos	700	Huracanes Izcalli	0–1	Calor	80
11	CDM	1–4	Poza Rica	200	Calor	0–1	Santiago	30
12	Poza Rica	1–0	Atlético Pachuca	1,000	Real Zamora	1–1	Calor	50
13	Ayense	1–2	Cordobés	350	Cañoneros	0–1	Santiago	50

Source: Liga Premier FMF

1. Does not include matches played behind closed doors.

=== Liguilla ===
The eight best teams play two games against each other on a home-and-away basis. The higher seeded teams play on their home field during the second leg. The winner of each match up is determined by aggregate score. In the quarterfinals and semifinals, if the two teams are tied on aggregate the higher seeded team advances. In the final, if the two teams are tied after both legs, the match goes to extra time and, if necessary, a penalty shoot-out.

Quarter-finals
2	Santiago (s)	1	1	2
7	Atlético Pachuca	1	1	2
1	Cordobés	0	2	2
8	Calor	3	2	5
3	Real Zamora	2	1	3
6	Cañoneros	0	1	1
4	CDM	0	0	0
5	Artesanos Metepec	1	0	1

Semi-finals
2	Santiago	0	4	4
8	Calor	1	0	0
3	Real Zamora	1	0	1
5	Artesanos Metepec	1	3	4

Final
2	Santiago	0	3	3
5	Artesanos Metepec	0	0	0

==== Quarter-finals ====
The first legs were played on 4 and 5 December, and the second legs will be played on 7 and 8 December 2024.

Team 1	Agg.	Team 2	1st leg	2nd leg
Cordobés	2–5	Calor	0–3	2–2
Santiago (s)	2–2	Atlético Pachuca	1–1	1–1
Real Zamora	3–1	Cañoneros	2–0	1–1
CDM	0–1	Artesanos Metepec	0–1	0–0

Matches

4 December 2024
16:00 CST (UTC−6)

Calor	3–0	Cordobés
Vargas 1', 49'; Pérez 16'	Report

Estadio Antonio R. Márquez, San Juan de los Lagos
Attendance: 400
Referee: Oscar Yair Toledo Pineda
7 December 2024
16:00 CST (UTC−6)

Cordobés	2–2	Calor
Rullan 4'; Pérez 90+1'	Report	Mayorga 51'; López 90+4'

Estadio Alberto Pérez Navarro, Huixquilucan
Attendance: 300
Referee: Yair Ugalde Rivera

Calor won 2–5 on aggregate.

4 December 2024
16:00 CST (UTC−6)

Atlético Pachuca	1–1	Santiago
Luna 33'	Report	Sánchez 45'

Estadio Municipal, Atitalaquía
Attendance: 200
Referee: Maximiliano Arias Guzmán
7 December 2024
11:00 CST (UTC−6)

Santiago	1–1	Atlético Pachuca
Sánchez 28'	Report	González 90+4'

La Capilla Soccer Park, Allende
Attendance: 100
Referee: Julio Eduardo Candelas Ramírez

2–2 on aggregate. Santiago advanced due to being the higher seeded team.

5 December 2024
20:15 CST (UTC−6)

Cañoneros	0–2	Real Zamora
	Report	Reyes 49'; Ávalos 86'

Estadio Antonio M. Quirasco, Xalapa
Attendance: 200
Referee: Yoel Guzmán Hernández
8 December 2024
11:00 CST (UTC−6)

Real Zamora	1–1	Cañoneros
Ríos 4'	Report	Huerta 87'

Estadio Juan N. López, La Piedad
Attendance: 200
Referee: Marco Antonio Návez Hernández

Real Zamora won 3–1 on aggregate.

4 December 2024
15:30 CST (UTC−6)

Artesanos Metepec	1–0	CDM
Fuentes 61'	Report

Unidad Deportiva Alarcón Hisojo, Metepec
Attendance: 300
Referee: Harold Rodríguez Pérez
7 December 2024
15:30 CST (UTC−6)

CDM	0–0	Artesanos Metepec
	Report

Estadio Valentín González, Xochimilco
Attendance: 150
Referee: Jonathan Arturo Betancourt Galindo

Artesanos Metepec won 0–1 on aggregate.

==== Semi-finals ====
The first legs were played on 11 and 12 December, and the second legs were played on 14 and 15 December 2024.

Team 1	Agg.	Team 2	1st leg	2nd leg
Santiago	4–1	Calor	0–1	4–0
Real Zamora	1–4	Artesanos Metepec	1–1	0–3

Matches

11 December 2024
16:00 CST (UTC−6)

Calor	1–0	Santiago
González 59'	Report

Estadio Antonio R. Márquez, San Juan de los Lagos
Attendance: 300
Referee: Julio Eduardo Candelas Ramírez
14 December 2024
12:00 CST (UTC−6)

Santiago	4–0	Calor
Rodríguez 30'; Gámez 49'; Luna 75', 85'	Report

La Capilla Soccer Park, Allende
Attendance: 200
Referee: Maximiliano Arias Guzmán

Santiago won 4-1 on aggregate.

12 December 2024
15:30 CST (UTC−6)

Artesanos Metepec	1–1	Real Zamora
Flores 38'	Report	Rodríguez 67'

Unidad Deportiva Alarcón Hisojo, Metepec
Attendance: 600
Referee: Harold Rodríguez Pérez
15 December 2024
11:00 CST (UTC−6)

Real Zamora	0–3	Artesanos Metepec
	Report	Serrano 13'; Cruz 48'; Rodríguez 58'

Estadio Juan N. López, La Piedad
Attendance: 300
Referee: Yoel Guzmán Hernández

Artesanos Metepec won 1-4 on aggregate.

==== Final ====
The first leg was played on 18 December, and the second leg was played on 21 December 2024.

Team 1	Agg.	Team 2	1st leg	2nd leg
Santiago	3–0	Artesanos Metepec	0–0	3–0

Matches

18 December 2024
15:30 CST (UTC−6)

Artesanos Metepec	0–0	Santiago
	Report

Unidad Deportiva Alarcón Hisojo, Metepec
Attendance: 700
Referee: Marco Antonio Návez Hernández
21 December 2024
17:00 CST (UTC−6)

Santiago	3–0	Artesanos Metepec
Rodríguez 15'; Ávalos 30'; Morales 70'	Report

La Capilla Soccer Park, Allende
Attendance: Yair Ugalde Rivera
Referee: 600

Santiago won 3–0 on aggregate.

Apertura 2024 winners

1st title

== Torneo Clausura ==
The Clausura tournament began on 10 January 2025.

=== Standings ===
Pos	Team	Pld	W	D	L	GF	GA	GD	BP	Pts	Qualification or relegation
1	Santiago	12	8	2	2	22	10	+12	1	27	Qualification to Quarter–finals
2	Atlético Pachuca	12	5	6	1	28	14	+14	3	24	Qualification to Quarter–finals
3	Artesanos Metepec	12	7	1	4	17	9	+8	2	24	Qualification to Quarter–finals
4	Ayense	12	6	3	3	26	18	+8	2	23	Qualification to Quarter–finals
5	Cordobés	12	6	3	3	17	13	+4	2	23	Qualification to Quarter–finals
6	Cañoneros	12	5	3	4	20	17	+3	1	19	Qualification to Quarter–finals
7	Calor	12	5	3	4	19	16	+3	1	19	Qualification to Quarter–finals
8	CDM	12	5	3	4	15	12	+3	0	18	Qualification to Quarter–finals
9	Poza Rica	12	4	4	4	18	22	−4	1	17	
10	Real Zamora	12	2	4	6	15	21	−6	2	12	
11	Caja Oblatos	12	3	1	8	20	38	−18	1	11	
12	Ciervos	12	2	2	8	8	27	−19	0	8	
13	Huracanes Izcalli	12	2	1	9	16	24	−8	0	7	

Updated to match(es) played on 5 April 2025. Source: Liga Premier FMF

=== Positions by round ===
Leader and qualification to Liguilla quarter-finals
Qualification to quarter-finals
Last place in table

Team ╲ Round	1	2	3	4	5	6	7	8	9	10	11	12	13
Santiago	10	6	9	7	3	2	2	1	1	1	1	1^{†}	1
Atlético Pachuca	3	3	5	8^{†}	9	6	5	6	4	5	5	4	2
Artesanos Metepec	1	2	1	1	4	7^{†}	4	4	3	2	2	2	3
Ayense	5	10	12	12	10	9	9	5	6^{†}	7	6	5	4
Cordobés	13	7	3	3	1	1	1	2	2	3^{†}	3	3	5
Cañoneros	6	8	10	11	8	10	10^{†}	11	11	9	7	6	6
Calor	2	5	6	2	5^{†}	3	3	3	5	4	4	7	7
CDM	11	4	7^{†}	5	6	8	8	7	7	6	8	8	8
Poza Rica	8^{†}	9	4	6	7	5	7	8	9	8	9	9	9
Real Zamora	9	13	8	9	12	11	12	10	10	11	10	10	10^{†}
Caja Oblatos	4	1	2	4	2	4	6	9^{†}	8	10	11	11	11
Ciervos	12	12^{†}	11	10	11	12	11	12	12	12	12	12	12
Huracanes Izcalli	7	11	13	13	13	13	13	13	13	13	13^{†}	13	13

Updated to match(es) played on 5 April 2025. Source: Liga Premier FMF
Notes: † indicates team rested that round

=== Results ===
Home \ Away	ART	ATP	AYE	CAJ	CAL	CAÑ	CDM	CIE	COR	HUR	PZR	RZA	SAN
Artesanos Metepec	—	0–0	—	3–0	0–1	3–1	0–1	—	—	—	—	—	—
Atlético Pachuca	—	—	—	4–1	—	—	2–1	—	0–0	—	5–0	—	0–0
Ayense	2–1	2–2	—	4–2	—	—	—	2–1	—	5–2	—	1–2	—
Caja Oblatos	—	—	—	—	1–4	1–1	2–1	—	3–5	—	2–4	—	2–1
Calor	—	1–1	0–2	—	—	3–1	—	3–1	—	2–0	—	1–1	—
Cañoneros	—	4–1	2–1	—	—	—	—	1–1	—	3–2	—	3–0	—
CDM	—	—	1–1	—	3–1	2–0	—	0–1	—	3–2	—	1–0	—
Ciervos	0–4	1–7	—	2–1	—	—	—	—	0–2	—	0–1	—	0–3
Cordobés	0–2	—	1–3	—	1–1	1–3	1–0	—	—	—	3–1	—	2–0
Huracanes Izcalli	0–1	1–3	—	7–1	—	—	—	0–0	0–1	—	—	1–0	—
Poza Rica	0–1	—	1–1	—	3–2	0–0	1–1	—	—	4–1	—	2–2	—
Real Zamora	1–2	3–3	—	2–4	—	—	—	3–1	0–0	—	—	—	1–2
Santiago	3–0	—	3–2	—	2–0	2–1	1–1	—	—	1–0	4–1	—	—

Updated to match(es) played on 5 April 2025. Source: Liga Premier FMF
Legend: Blue = home team win; Yellow = draw; Red = away team win.

=== Regular season statistics ===
==== Top goalscorers ====
Players sorted first by goals scored, then by last name.

Rank	Player	Club	Goals
1	(Mexico) Juan José González	Atlético Pachuca	9
2	(Mexico) José Birche	Poza Rica	7
2	(Mexico) Sebastián Cárdenas	Ayense	7
4	(Mexico) Germán Balcázar	Caja Oblatos	6
4	(Mexico) Ulises Osorio	Cañoneros	6
6	(Mexico) Alan Delgado	CDM	5
6	(Mexico) Armando Domínguez	Cordobés	5
6	(Mexico) Juan Manuel Fuentes	Artesanos Metepec	5
6	(Mexico) Sergio Tinoco	Ayense	5
10	(Mexico) Emiliano Chong	Cordobés	4
10	(Mexico) Juan José Gámez	Santiago	4
10	(Mexico) Javier González	Calor	4
10	(Mexico) Raymundo Mejía	Huracanes Izcalli	4
10	(Mexico) Daniel Rangel	Atlético Pachuca	4
10	(Mexico) Daniel Rodríguez	Huracanes Izcalli	4
10	(Mexico) Miguel Ángel Sánchez	Ciervos	4
10	(Mexico) Darién Velázquez	CDM	4

Source:Liga Premier FMF

==== Hat-tricks ====
Player	For	Against	Result	Date	Round	Reference
(Mexico) Armando Domínguez^{4}	Cordobés	Caja Oblatos	5 – 3 (A)	30 March 2025	12	
(Mexico) Juan José González	Atlético Pachuca	Ciervos	1 – 7 (A)	5 April 2025	13	

^{4} Player scored four goals
(H) – Home; (A) – Away

=== Attendance ===
==== Per team ====
Pos	Team	Total	High	Low	Average	Change
1	Poza Rica	8,700	2,000	900	1,450	+61.1%
2	Ayense	3,750	1,000	400	625	+67.6%
3	Artesanos Metepec	980	300	80	196	−5.3%
4	Ciervos	800	200	100	133	+40.0%
5	Huracanes Izcalli	760	300	50	127	+33.7%
6	Atlético Pachuca	520	120	100	104	0.0%
7	Caja Oblatos	600	150	50	100	−7.4%^{4}
8	Cañoneros	470	150	70	94	−84.1%
9	Cordobés	610	150	30	87	−20.9%
10	CDM	480	150	50	80	−34.4%
11	Calor	480	200	30	80	−1.2%
12	Santiago	530	100	30	76	−32.1%^{1}
13	Real Zamora	330	100	30	55	−45.0%^{1,3}
	League total	19,010	2,000	30	244	+6.1%

Source: Liga Premier FMF
Notes:
Only regular season listed
1: The team played at least one match on an alternative field.
2: The team had at least one match canceled for administrative issues.
3: Since Week 7 Real Zamora was relocated from La Piedad to Toluca.
4: Since Week 9 Caja Oblatos was relocated from Zapotlanejo to Tonalá.

==== Highest and lowest ====
Highest attended					Lowest attended			
Week	Home	Score	Away	Attendance	Home	Score	Away	Attendance
1	Ayense	5–2	Huracanes Izcalli	400	Caja Oblatos	2–1	Santiago	50
2	Poza Rica	0–0	Cañoneros	2,000	Real Zamora	2–4	Caja Oblatos	50
3	Ayense	1–2	Real Zamora	1,000	Calor	1–1	Atlético Pachuca	50
4	Poza Rica	1–1	Ayense	1,500	Real Zamora	0–0	Cordobés	30
5	Ayense	2–1	Ciervos	400	Cordobés	3–1	Poza Rica	80
6	Poza Rica	4–1	Huracanes Izcalli	1,300	CDM	1–1	Ayense	50
7	Ayense	2–2	Atlético Pachuca	400	Santiago	4–1	Poza Rica	30
8	Poza Rica	2–2	Real Zamora	1,000	Calor	0–2	Ayense	50
9	Poza Rica	0–1	Artesanos Metepec	1,000	Santiago	1–1	CDM	50
10	Cañoneros	2–1	Ayense	150	Calor	2–0	Huracanes Izcalli	30
11	Poza Rica	1–1	CDM	1,000	Cordobés	1–3	Cañoneros	50
12	Ayense	2–1	Artesanos Metepec	1,000	Cañoneros	3–2	Huracanes Izcalli	100
13	Poza Rica	3–2	Calor	900	Cordobés	1–3	Ayense	30

Source: Liga Premier FMF

1. Does not include matches played behind closed doors.

=== Liguilla ===
The eight best teams play two games against each other on a home-and-away basis. The higher seeded teams play on their home field during the second leg. The winner of each match up is determined by aggregate score. In the quarterfinals and semifinals, if the two teams are tied on aggregate the higher seeded team advances. In the final, if the two teams are tied after both legs, the match goes to extra time and, if necessary, a penalty shoot-out.

Quarter-finals
1	Santiago	4	0	4
8	CDM	0	0	0
4	Ayense	2	4	6
5	Cordobés	1	0	1
2	Atlético Pachuca (s)	0	1	1
7	Calor	1	0	1
3	Artesanos Metepec	1	4	5
6	Cañoneros	1	1	2

Semi-finals
1	Santiago	2	2	4
4	Ayense	0	0	0
2	Atlético Pachuca (s)	1	1	2
3	Artesanos Metepec	1	1	2

Final
1	Santiago	1	2	3
2	Atlético Pachuca	1	1	2

==== Quarter-finals ====
The first legs were played on 12 April, and the second legs were played on 19 April 2025.

Team 1	Agg.	Team 2	1st leg	2nd leg
Santiago	4–0	CDM	4–0	0–0
Atlético Pachuca (s)	1–1	Calor	0–1	1–0
Artesanos Metepec	5–2	Cañoneros	1–1	4–1
Ayense	6–1	Cordobés	2–1	4–0

Matches

12 April 2025
16:00 CST (UTC−6)

CDM	0–4	Santiago
	Report	Morales 7', 55'; Rodríguez 10'; Ávalos 40'

Estadio Valentín González, Xochimilco
Attendance: 250
Referee: José Andrés Elías Zarzoza
19 April 2025
18:00 CST (UTC−6)

Santiago	0–0	CDM
	Report

La Capilla Soccer Park, Allende
Attendance: 200
Referee: Omar Alejandro Ortega García

Santiago won 4–0 on aggregate.

12 April 2025
12:00 CST (UTC−6)

Calor	1–0	Atlético Pachuca
Hernández 76'	Report

Estadio Antonio R. Márquez, San Juan de los Lagos
Attendance: 100
Referee: Rogelio Sergio Arellano Corona
19 April 2025
16:00 CST (UTC−6)

Atlético Pachuca	1–0	Calor
Luna 61'	Report

Estadio Municipal, Atitalaquía
Attendance: 100
Referee: Alejandro Torres Favela

1–1 on aggregate. Atlético Pachuca advanced due to being the higher seeded team.

12 April 2025
16:30 CST (UTC−6)

Cañoneros	1–1	Artesanos Metepec
Villa 51'	Report	Flores 33'

Estadio Antonio M. Quirasco, Xalapa
Attendance: 1,200
Referee: Daniel Misael Marin Quiroz
19 April 2025
16:00 CST (UTC−6)

Artesanos Metepec	4–1	Cañoneros
Ruiz 9'; García 35'; Fuentes 61'; Rodríguez 81'	Report	Osorio 87'

Unidad Deportiva Alarcón Hisojo, Metepec
Attendance: 200
Referee: Adrián Jhonatan del Ángel Olán

Artesanos Metepec won 5–2 on aggregate.

12 April 2025
16:00 CST (UTC−6)

Cordobés	1–2	Ayense
Domínguez 81'	Report	Ríos 1'; Tinoco 44'

Estadio Alberto Pérez Navarro, Huixquilucan
Attendance: 200
Referee: Rolando Arturo Alcalá Ramírez
19 April 2025
18:00 CST (UTC−6)

Ayense	4–0	Cordobés
Cárdenas 14'; Castro 25'; Medina 59'; Ríos 69'	Report

Estadio Chino Rivas, Ayotlán
Attendance: 1,200
Referee: Benjamín Hernández Rodríguez

Ayense won 6–1 on aggregate.

==== Semi–finals ====
The first legs were played on 23 and 24 April, and the second legs were played on 26 and 27 April 2025.

Team 1	Agg.	Team 2	1st leg	2nd leg
Santiago	4–0	Ayense	2–0	2–0
Atlético Pachuca (s)	2–2	Artesanos Metepec	1–1	1–1

Matches

23 April 2025
19:00 CST (UTC−6)

Ayense	0–2	Santiago
	Report	Gámez 33'; Rodríguez 86'

Estadio Chino Rivas, Ayotlán
Attendance: 3,000
Referee: Alejandro Torres Favela
26 April 2025
18:00 CST (UTC−6)

Santiago	2–0	Ayense
Morales 13'; Ávalos 15'	Report

La Capilla Soccer Park, Allende
Attendance: 200
Referee: Adrián Jhonatan Del Ángel Olán

Santiago won 4–0 on aggregate.

24 April 2025
16:00 CST (UTC−6)

Artesanos Metepec	1–1	Atlético Pachuca
Flores 49'	Report	Rodríguez 10'

Unidad Deportiva Alarcón Hisojo, Metepec
Attendance: 500
Referee: Rolando Arturo Alcalá Ramírez
27 April 2025
16:00 CST (UTC−6)

Atlético Pachuca	1–1	Artesanos Metepec
González 36'	Report	Fuentes 45'

Estadio Municipal, Atitalaquía
Attendance: 200
Referee: José Andrés Elías Zarzoza

2–2 on aggregate. Atlético Pachuca advanced due to being the higher seeded team.

==== Final ====
The first leg was played on 30 April, and the second leg was played on 3 May 2025.

Team 1	Agg.	Team 2	1st leg	2nd leg
Santiago	3–2	Atlético Pachuca	1–1	2–1

30 April 2025
11:00 CST (UTC−6)

Atlético Pachuca	1–1	Santiago
Luna 50'	Report	M. Morales 90+3'

Estadio Hidalgo, Pachuca
Attendance: 300
Referee: Adrián Jhonatan del Ángel Olán
3 May 2025
18:00 CST (UTC−6)

Santiago	2–1	Atlético Pachuca
J. Rodríguez 27', 89'	Report

La Capilla Soccer Park, Allende
Attendance: 500
Referee: José Andrés Elías Zarzoza

Santiago won 3–2 on aggregate.

Clausura 2025 winners

2nd title

== Promotion to Serie A ==
As champion of the two tournaments of the season, Santiago F.C. won the right to be promoted to Serie A, however, the team promotion is conditional upon compliance with the rules to obtain the certification necessary to participate in the Serie A.

== Coefficient table ==
P	Team	Pts	G	Pts/G	GD
1	Santiago	53	24	2.208	+26
2	Cordobés	50	24	2.083	+9
3	Artesanos Metepec	46	24	1.917	+23
4	Atlético Pachuca	43	24	1.792	+21
5	CDM	41	24	1.708	+9
6	Cañoneros	41	24	1.708	+8
7	Ayense	38	24	1.583	+4
8	Calor	38	24	1.583	+3
9	Real Zamora	36	24	1.500	0
10	Poza Rica	35	24	1.458	–7
11	Huracanes Izcalli	15	24	0.625	–19
12	Caja Oblatos	13	24	0.542	–36
13	Ciervos	12	24	0.500	–42

Last updated: April 5, 2025
Source: Liga Premier FMF
P = Position; G = Games played; Pts = Points; Pts/G = Ratio of points to games played; GD = Goal difference

== See also ==
- 2024–25 Liga MX season
- 2024–25 Liga de Expansión MX season
- 2024–25 Serie A de México season
- 2024–25 Liga TDP season
- 2024 Copa Promesas MX
- 2025 Copa Conecta
