= Copa Promesas MX =

Youth association football competition in Mexico

- Organiser(s): Mexican Football Federation
- Founded: 17 July 2024; 2 years ago
- Region: Mexico
- Teams: 64
- Current champions: LMX-LP: Racing (1st title); LMX-TDP: Deportiva Venados TDP (1st title)
- Most championships: Halcones; Racing; Deportiva Venados TDP (1 title each)
- 2026–27 Copa Promesas MX

Copa Promesas MX is a youth association football competition in Mexico and a domestic cup tournament for the Under-21 teams of clubs in the Liga MX, Liga Premier and Liga TDP. The tournament is contested by 64 participating youth teams: 18 Liga MX teams, 14 Liga Premier teams and 32 Liga TDP teams.

The tournament has been held in two editions, the inaugural season was played in 2024 with Halcones crowned as the first champions.

In 2024, it was contested by Liga Premier and Liga TDP clubs, and the Under-19 teams of Liga MX clubs. In 2025, the competition was divided into two tournaments: Copa Promesas LMX-LP for Liga Premier clubs and the Under-19 teams of Liga MX clubs, and Copa Promesas LMX-TDP for Liga TDP clubs and the Under-17 teams of Liga MX clubs.

Three clubs have been champions at least once. Halcones, Racing and Deportiva Venados TDP are the most successful clubs with one title each.

== History ==
The tournament was established to improve the sporting development of the players in the clubs from the lower divisions of Mexican football and also the youth teams of the top division clubs, in response to the fans' complaint about the lack of development of youth football players in Mexico.

However, this project was also criticized by fans because they considered it as an incomplete version of the previous Copa MX and a substitute for the lack of promotion opportunities for the clubs that are playing in the lower divisions.

In 2025, the FMF decided to divide the competition into two tournaments: Copa Promesas LMX-LP and Copa Promesas LMX-TDP, although that division was only implemented during the cup that was played that year.

In 2026, the FMF and the three leagues decided to return to a unified cup format; additionally, the tournament shifted to a biennial schedule, beginning in September and concluding in April of the following year, to allow more playing time for the 64 participating teams.

== Competition format ==
The tournament has 64 participating teams, all the Under-21 teams that are part of the youth academy structure of the 18 Liga MX clubs, 14 clubs from Liga Premier and 32 clubs from Liga TDP. All participants are selected by invitation, both tournaments consists of five stages (Group stage, Round of 16, Quarter-finals, Semifinals and Final).

All matches in the final phase are played in a two-legged format. During the group stage, if the matches end in a tie a penalty shoot-out is played to award an extra point.

Since the 2026–27 edition, the competition is held during September to April as a mid–week tournament for the Liga Premier and Liga TDP clubs, in addition to giving activity to the youth teams of the Liga MX.

== Results ==
Ed.	Season	Champions	Results	Runners-up	Manager
Copa Promesas LMX-LP-TDP (Note: Liga Premier and Liga TDP clubs, and the Under-19 teams of Liga MX clubs.)
1	2024	Halcones	0–0 (4–3 p)	Santiago	(Mexico); Carlos Salcido
2	2025 (Note: The competition was divided into two tournaments which were part of the same season.)				
2	2025	Copa Promesas LMX-LP (Note: Liga Premier clubs and the Under-19 teams of Liga MX clubs.)			
2	2025	Racing	3–1	Ensenada	(Mexico); Víctor Hernández
2	2025	Copa Promesas LMX-TDP (Note: Liga TDP clubs and the Under-17 teams of Liga MX clubs.)			
2	2025	Deportiva Venados TDP	1–1 (4–3 p)	Tigres de Álica TDP	(Mexico); Diego Morales
Copa Promesas MX (Under-21 teams)
3	2026–27	TBD			

== Performances ==
Rank	Club	Titles	Runners-up	Seasons
1	Halcones	1	0	2024
1	Racing	1	0	LMX-LP-2025
1	Deportiva Venados TDP	1	0	LMX-TDP-2025
4	Santiago	0	1	—
4	Ensenada	0	1	—
4	Tigres de Álica TDP	0	1	—

== See also ==
- Sport in Mexico
- Football in Mexico
- Mexican Football Federation
- Liga Premier
- Liga TDP
- Copa Conecta
