= Deportiva Venados =

- Full name: Club Deportiva Venados
- Nickname: Venados (Deer)
- Founded: 2014; 12 years ago (as Mérida B)
- Ground: Estadio Alonso Diego Molina
- Capacity: 2,500
- Owner: David Lago Ancona
- Chairman: Alonso Diego Molina
- Manager: Alfredo García Salmones
- League: Liga Premier (Primera Premier)
- 2025–26: Regular phase: 2nd of 13 (Group III); Final phase: Champions
Home colours	Away colours

Club Deportiva Venados is a professional football club based in Tamanché, Yucatán. The club competes in Liga Premier (Primera Premier), the third level of Mexican football, and plays its home matches at Estadio Alonso Diego Molina. Founded in 2014, during its first season was registered as Mérida B by acquiring the reserve and affiliate team of Mérida FC. The club officially adopted its current name in 2015 to recover the tradition of franchises that previously represented the state of Yucatán.

== History ==
Deportiva Venados was founded with the aim to reviving the traditional colors and the name of Venados previously used by the football clubs representing Yucatán, as the state's main franchise had changed its colors and name to Mérida FC. However, the club had to be registered as Mérida B during the 2014–15 season of the Tercera División, due to the purchase of the Mérida FC reserve team that was competing in that division. In 2015, the name Deportiva Venados was officially registered with the FMF.

In the 2021–22 season the club was promoted to the Liga Premier de México (Serie A), after defeating C.D. Avispones de Chilpancingo in the promotion playoff. Previously the team had eliminated clubs Álamos, Inter Playa del Carmen, Caballeros de Córdoba and Delfines UGM. However, the team failed to win the national championship as it was defeated in the final by Mazorqueros F.C.

In the 2025–26 Serie A de México season Deportiva Venados were crowned champions after defeating Alacranes de Durango in the final with an aggregate score of 1–2. Previously, the team had eliminated Club Calor; Tritones Vallarta M.F.C. and Real Apodaca F.C. However, the team was unable to move up to the Liga de Expansión MX because it did not meet the requirements requested by the league, since Venados F.C., the other team from Mérida, did not agree to share the use of the Estadio Carlos Iturralde, the city's main field, and the Estadio Alonso Diego Molina, home of Deportiva Venados, is not suitable to host matches of that division.

== Stadium ==
Deportiva Venados plays its home matches at Estadio Alonso Diego Molina located in the town of Tamanché, belonging to the city of Mérida, Yucatán. It has a capacity to hold 2,500 spectators.

== Honours ==
Domestic
Type	Competition	Titles	Seasons	Runners-up
Lower levels FMF	Liga Premier	1	2025–26	—
Lower levels FMF	Liga TDP	0	—	2021–22
Lower levels FMF	Liga TDP Zona A	1	2021–22	—

== Players ==
=== First-team squad ===
As of 2 September 2026

Note: Flags indicate national team as defined under FIFA eligibility rules; some limited exceptions apply. Players may hold more than one non-FIFA nationality.

No.	Pos.	Nation	Player
1	GK	MEX	Heldrich Noguera
2	DF	MEX	Edson Jaramillo
3	DF	MEX	Luis Carrillo
4	DF	MEX	Alan Zubiri
5	DF	MEX	Néstor Díaz
6	MF	MEX	Jaciel Rubio
7	MF	MEX	Jayson Sosa
8	MF	MEX	José Flores
10	MF	MEX	Jesús Reyes
11	FW	MEX	Francisco Castañeda
12	DF	MEX	Omar Reynoso
13	GK	MEX	Lothar López
14	MF	MEX	César Santana
15	MF	MEX	Brayan Beltrán

No.	Pos.	Nation	Player
16	MF	MEX	Carlos Frayde
17	FW	MEX	Ricardo Alba
18	DF	MEX	Ernesto Aquino
19	FW	ECU	Santiago Micolta
20	MF	MEX	Cristian García
21	MF	MEX	Renato Jaramillo
22	MF	MEX	Miguel González
23	FW	MEX	Jonathan Parra
24	GK	MEX	Axel Quiroz
25	DF	MEX	Francisco Soberanis
26	DF	MEX	Kevin Sandoval
28	FW	MEX	Giovanny Herrera
30	DF	MEX	Érick Hernández
32	DF	MEX	José Juan Rodríguez

== Reserves ==
=== Deportiva Venados TDP ===
Reserve team that plays in the Liga TDP, the fourth level of the Mexican football league system. The team won the Copa Promesas LMX-TDP in 2025.
