= Copa Conecta =

Association football competition in Mexico

- Organiser(s): Mexican Football Federation
- Founded: 24 November 2021; 4 years ago
- Region: Mexico
- Teams: 32
- Current champions: Racing (1st title)
- Most championships: Aguacateros de Peribán; Inter Playa del Carmen; Racing Porto Palmeiras; Santiago; Racing (1 title each)
- Website: copaconecta.com.mx
- 2026 Copa Conecta

Copa Conecta is a professional association football competition in Mexico and a domestic cup tournament for clubs in the Liga Premier and Liga TDP. The tournament is contested by 32 participating clubs: 12 Liga Premier clubs and 20 Liga TDP clubs.

The tournament has been held in five editions, the inaugural season was played in 2021–22 with Aguacateros de Peribán crowned as the first champions.

Five clubs have been champions at least once. Aguacateros de Peribán, Inter Playa del Carmen, Racing Porto Palmeiras, Santiago and Racing are the most successful clubs with one title each.

== History ==
The tournament was created in 2021 by the Mexican Football Federation (FMF), with the aim of providing a greater opportunity for the development of football players from Liga Premier and Liga TDP.

The tournament is played by 32 clubs: 12 from Liga Premier and 20 from Liga TDP. The Liga Premier representatives are those that occupied the first 12 positions in the Apertura Tournament of the Serie B. The Liga TDP representatives are the 17 group leaders from the first half of the season and the three clubs with the best coefficient.

== Competition format ==
The tournament consists of five stages (Round of 32, Round of 16, Quarter-finals, Semifinals and Final). The matches are played in a single round in the field of the club participating in the TDP League, in case the two clubs play in the same league, the match will be played in the field of the best ranked club. If there is a tie at the end of regular time, a round of penalty kicks will be played to determine the winners.

Geographic location is the criteria for matches. The affiliated clubs of Liga MX and Liga de Expansión MX can participate in the cup but only with the players who were registered in the squads for Liga Premier and TDP.

== Results ==
Ed.	Season	Champions	Results	Runners-up	Manager
1	2021–22	Aguacateros de Peribán	1–1 (6–5 p)	Muxes	(Mexico); Olimpo Campos
2	2023	Inter Playa del Carmen	2–0	Calor	(Mexico); Carlos Bracamontes
3	2024	Racing Porto Palmeiras	2–0	Diablos Tesistán	(Mexico); Héctor Jair Real
4	2025	Santiago	3–0	Real Zamora	(Mexico); Martín Moreno
5	2026	Racing	1–0	Tigres de Álica TDP	(Mexico); Víctor Hernández

== Performances ==
Rank	Club	Titles	Runners-up	Seasons
1	Aguacateros de Peribán	1	0	2021–22
1	Inter Playa del Carmen	1	0	2023
1	Racing Porto Palmeiras	1	0	2024
1	Santiago	1	0	2025
1	Racing	1	0	2026
6	Calor	0	1	—
6	Muxes	0	1	—
6	Diablos Tesistán	0	1	—
6	Real Zamora	0	1	—
6	Tigres de Álica TDP	0	1	—

== See also ==
- Sport in Mexico
- Football in Mexico
- Mexican Football Federation
- Liga Premier
- Liga TDP
- Copa Promesas MX
