= Érick Ávalos =

Mexican footballer (born 2000)

Personal information
- Full name: Érick Alejandro Ávalos Alejo
- Date of birth: 21 April 2000 (age 26)
- Place of birth: Juárez, Nuevo León, Mexico
- Height: 1.78 m (5 ft 10 in)
- Position: Defender

Team information
- Current team: Santiago
- Number: 8

Youth career
- 2018–2019: Yalmakán
- 2020: Tigres UANL

Senior career*
Years	Team	Apps	(Gls)
2020–2021	Tigres UANL	7	(0)
2023	Chihuahua	2	(0)
2023–	Santiago	60	(4)
- * Club domestic league appearances and goals as of 5 December 2021

Érick Alejandro Ávalos Alejo (born 21 April 2000) is a Mexican professional footballer who plays as a defender for Santiago.

== Career statistics ==
=== Club ===
As of 5 December 2021

Club	Season	League			Cup		Continental		Other		Total	
Club	Season	Division	Apps	Goals	Apps	Goals	Apps	Goals	Apps	Goals	Apps	Goals
Tigres UANL	2020–21	Liga MX	5	0	—		1 (Note: Appearance in Leagues Cup)	0	—		6	0
Tigres UANL	2021–22	Liga MX	2	0	—		—		—		2	0
Tigres UANL	Total		7	0	—		1	0	—		8	0
Career total			7	0	0	0	1	0	0	0	8	0

== Honours ==
Tigres UANL

- CONCACAF Champions League: 2020
