= CDM F.C. =

Mexican football club

- Full name: CDM Fútbol Club
- Nicknames: Lobos (Wolves); La manada (The Herd)
- Founded: July 2021; 4 years ago
- Dissolved: 27 June 2025; 9 months ago
- Ground: Estadio Valentín González; Xochimilco, Mexico City
- Capacity: 2,500
- Owner: Ricardo Andrade
- Chairman: Ricardo Andrade
- League: Liga Premier – Serie B
- Clausura 2025: Regular season: 8th Play–offs: Quarter–finals
Home colours	Away colours

CDM F.C. was a Mexican football club that played in the Liga Premier – Serie B of the Segunda División de México, the third division level of Mexican football. It was based in Xochimilco, Mexico City.

== History ==
The team was founded in 2021 and was registered in the Tercera División de México. In its first season, the team finished first in its group, however, it was defeated in the first round of the promotion play off.

In the second season, the team placed first in its group, in addition to being the best team in the division at the national level, achieving a record of goals scored. However, the good performance in the regular season was not enough as the team was eliminated in the quarterfinal round by the club Faraones de Texcoco.

On June 30, 2023, CDM F.C. was announced as a new member of the Liga Premier – Serie B. The team was included in the league due to its good performance in the Tercera División during the previous season, in addition to the need to increase the number of participating teams in the league. After the league change, the team was relocated to Xochimilco, a municipality in the south of Mexico City, because of that town having a stadium with adequate capacity for the division.

On June 27, 2025 the team was relocated to Acámbaro, Guanajuato and renamed Acámbaro F.C.
