= Football in Mexico =

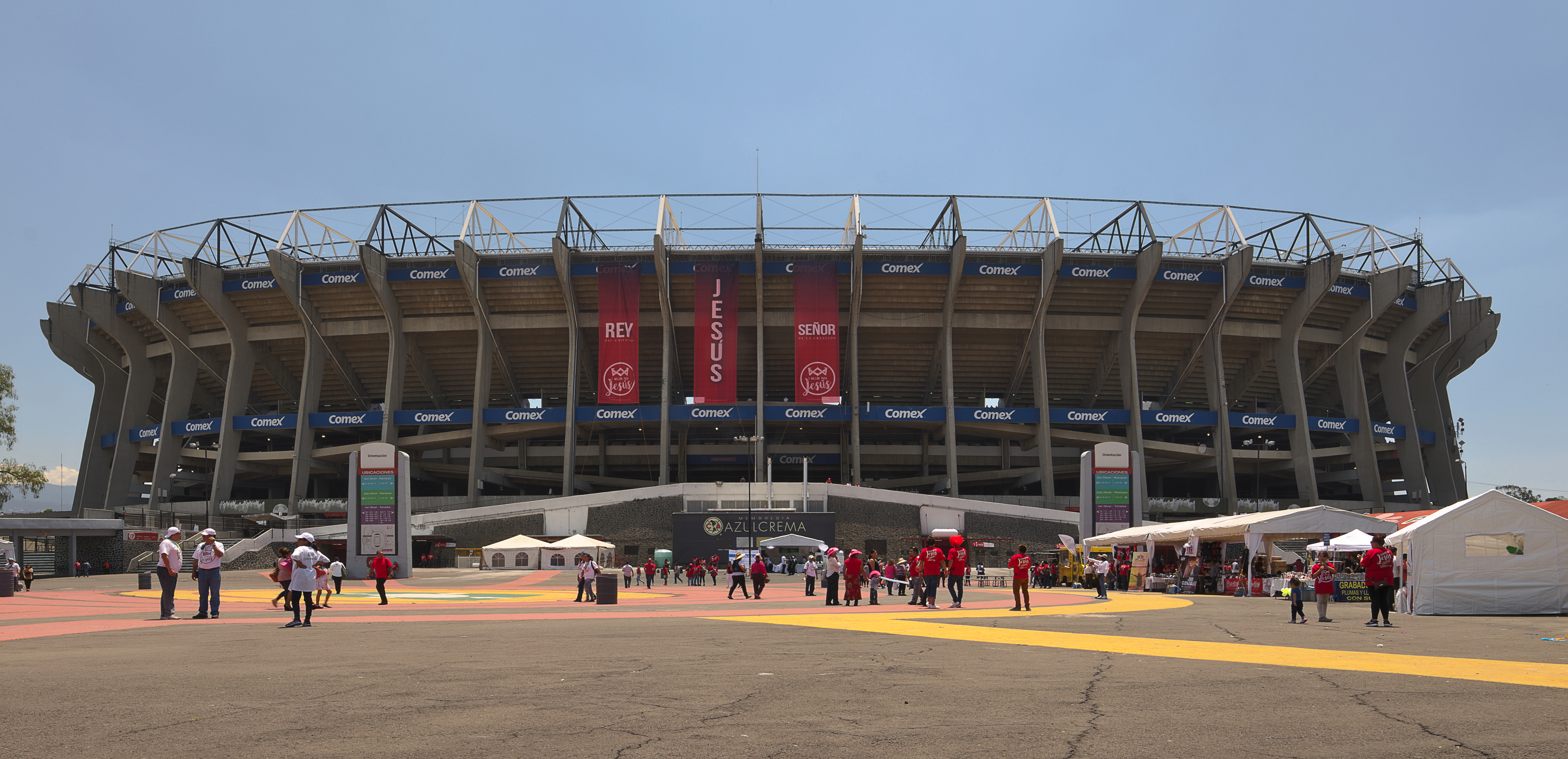
- Estadio Azteca, the Mexico's largest capacity stadium and the home of América, Cruz Azul, Atlante and the Mexico national football team.
- Country: Mexico
- Governing body: Federación Mexicana de Fútbol
- National team: Mexico
- Nickname: El Tri
- First played: 1923
- Clubs: 18 (Liga MX)

The most popular sport in Mexico is association football (Spanish: Fútbol), 73% of the Mexican population consider themselves football supporters. The highest level professional leagues in the country are Liga MX for men and Liga Femenil for women. The governing body is the Mexican Football Federation (Spanish: Federación Mexicana de Fútbol), also known by its acronym FMF.

Mexico's largest capacity stadiums are Estadio Azteca, Estadio Olímpico Universitario, Estadio Jalisco, Estadio BBVA, Estadio Cuauhtémoc, Estadio Akron and Estadio Universitario, all with a capacity of over of 40,000.

The most successful clubs in men's football are América, Cruz Azul, Guadalajara, Toluca and León. The most successful clubs in women's football are Tigres UANL, América, Monterrey, Guadalajara and Pachuca.

== Competitions ==
Domestic
Men's clubs:
- Liga MX
- Campeón de Campeones
- Liga de Expansión MX
- Campeón de Campeones (Liga de Expansión MX)
- Liga Premier
- Liga TDP
- Copa Conecta

Women's clubs:

- Liga Femenil
- Campeón de Campeonas
- Liga TDP Femenil
International
Men's clubs:
- FIFA Club World Cup
- FIFA Intercontinental Cup
- FIFA Challenger Cup
- FIFA Derby of the Americas
- CONCACAF Champions Cup
- Leagues Cup
- Campeones Cup

Men's national teams:

- FIFA World Cup
- CONCACAF Gold Cup
- CONCACAF Nations League

Women's clubs:

- FIFA Women's Club World Cup
- FIFA Women's Champions Cup
- CONCACAF W Champions Cup

Women's national teams:

- FIFA Women's World Cup
- CONCACAF W Gold Cup
- CONCACAF W Championship

== Professional leagues ==
Mexican football league system consists of six professional leagues: Liga MX, Liga de Expansión MX, Liga Premier and Liga TDP for men. Liga Femenil and Liga TDP Femenil for women.

The professional era of the league was officially established in 1943, starting with the 1943–44 season of the Liga Mayor. Previously in the amateur era, the defunct Federación de Football Association created the Campeonato de Primera Fuerza, a local amateur league based in Mexico City, however, it is the only amateur league considered as the direct predecessor of the current Liga MX.

The first women's professional football league was the Liga MX Femenil, starting with the Apertura 2017 tournament. Previously, LIMEFFE organized the Superliga Femenil, a precursor semi-professional league which was played between 2007 and 2017.

Since 1970, champions have been defined by a final knockout phase, commonly known as Liguilla. Since 1996, the season is divided into two tournaments, currently known as Apertura and Clausura, this system is common throughout Latin America.

The most successful clubs in Liga MX are América with sixteen titles, Guadalajara and Toluca with twelve titles each, Cruz Azul with ten titles, León and Tigres UANL with eight titles each. The most successful clubs in Liga Femenil are Tigres UANL with seven titles, Monterrey with four titles, América with three titles, Guadalajara with two titles and Pachuca with one title.

Both final matches in the first season of the Liga MX Femenil set new world records for attendance at a women's football league match with 32,466 fans in attendance at the Apertura final and 51,211 at the Clausura final.

== Professional clubs ==
In 1892, Pachuca was the first football club established in Mexico, prior to the creation of the first amateur competitions. The top four most popular football clubs in Mexico are América, Guadalajara, Cruz Azul and Pumas UNAM, and also commonly considered as the Big Four of Mexican football. América and Guadalajara are the only two clubs that have participated in every season in the professional era of Mexico's top division.

=== Clubs by federative entity of Mexico ===
The following table shows the clubs currently competing in the three most important professional leagues in Mexico, Liga MX, Liga de Expansión MX and Liga Premier (Primera Premier). Mexico's 32 federative entities are orderer by population size, from largest to smallest.

Key to colors
Federative entities with two or more clubs in a league
Federative entities without clubs in the leagues

Region	Federative entity	Liga MX	Liga de Expansión MX	Liga Premier (Primera Premier)
Central South	State of Mexico	Toluca	—	Cordobés
Central South	Mexico City	América; Atlante; Cruz Azul; Pumas UNAM	—	
West	Jalisco	Atlas; Guadalajara	Leones Negros UdeG; Tapatío; Tepatitlán	Tritones Vallarta
East	Veracruz	—	Piratas	Montañeses
East	Puebla	Puebla	—	
North Central	Guanajuato	León	—	Atlético Celaya; Irapuato; Lobos ULMX
North East	Nuevo León	Monterrey; Tigres UANL	—	
South West	Chiapas	—		Jaguares; Tapachula Soconusco
West	Michoacán	—	Atlético Morelia	La Piedad; Purépechas
South West	Oaxaca	—	Alebrijes de Oaxaca	Chapulineros de Oaxaca; Racing
North West	Baja California	Tijuana	—	
North West	Chihuahua	Juárez	—	
South West	Guerrero	—		
North East	Tamaulipas	—	Jaiba Brava; Correcaminos UAT	—
North East	Coahuila	Santos Laguna	—	
East	Hidalgo	Pachuca	Cruz Azul Hidalgo	—
North West	Sinaloa	—	Dorados de Sinaloa	—
North West	Sonora	—		
North Central	San Luis Potosí	Atlético San Luis	—	
South East	Tabasco	—		
North Central	Querétaro	Querétaro	—	
South East	Yucatán	—	Venados	Deportiva Venados
South Central	Morelos	—		Zacatepec
South East	Quintana Roo	—	Cancún	Inter Playa del Carmen; Pioneros de Cancún
North West	Durango	—	Alacranes de Durango	—
North Central	Zacatecas	—	Mineros de Zacatecas	—
North Central	Aguascalientes	Necaxa	—	
East	Tlaxcala	—	Tlaxcala	—
West	Nayarit	—		Tigres de Álica
South East	Campeche	—		
North West	Baja California Sur	—	Atlético La Paz	Los Cabos United
West	Colima	—		

== National teams ==
=== Men's national team ===
The Mexico national football team has qualified for the FIFA World Cup eighteen times and has qualified consecutively since 1994, reaching the quarter-finals twice (1970 and 1986). Mexico has hosted the World Cup three times (1970, 1986, and 2026). Mexico won the 1999 FIFA Confederations Cup as hosts, defeating Brazil 4–3, becoming the only non-European or South American senior national team to have won an official competition directly organized by FIFA.

Mexico is the most successful national team in CONCACAF competitions with 15 official continental titles, winning 13 CONCACAF Championship/Gold Cup titles, one CONCACAF Nations League and one CONCACAF Cup. The team finished as runners-up twice in the Copa América (1993 and 2001), and also finished in third place three times (1997, 1999 and 2007).

=== Under-23 Olympic team ===
The under-23 has been Olympic medalists twice, winning the gold medal at the 2012 Olympic Games in London, defeating Brazil 2–1, and winning the bronze medal at the 2020 Olympic Games in Tokyo, defeating the hosts Japan 3–1.

=== Under-20 and Under-17 teams ===
The under-20 team finished as world runners-up in 1977, and also finished in third place in 2011. The under-17 team has been world champions twice (2005 and 2011), and also finished as runners-up twice (2013 and 2019).

=== Women's national team ===
The Mexico women's national football team was officially formed in 1991 to compete in the 1991 CONCACAF Women's Championship, its first appearance in the World Cup was in 1999. The team finished in third place in the 1970 unofficial World Cup held in Italy, and also finished as runners-up in the 1971 unofficial World Cup as hosts, with an estimated 110,000 people attended the final at Estadio Azteca.

== Players ==
The most recent Mexican players have joined clubs in Europe, including Jared Borgetti, Rafael Marquez, Gerardo Torrado, Cuauhtémoc Blanco, Nery Castillo, Carlos Salcido, Ricardo Osorio, Pável Pardo, Andrés Guardado, Guillermo Franco, Carlos Vela, Giovani dos Santos, Omar Bravo, Aaron Galindo, Héctor Moreno, Francisco Javier Rodriguez, Francisco Fonseca, Javier Hernández, Pablo Barrera, Efraín Juárez, Guillermo Ochoa, Jesús Corona, Héctor Herrera, Miguel Layún, Raúl Jiménez, Marco Fabián, Diego Reyes, Hirving Lozano, Edson Álvarez, Alexis Vega, Diego Lainez, Santiago Giménez.

== Mexican football federation ==
=== Precursor governing bodies ===
Football was introduced to Mexico by emigrant miners from Cornwall and other parts of the United Kingdom at the end of the 19th century. In 1892, Pachuca was the first football club founded in Mexico. In the early 1900s, football was used as a method to "indoctrinate modern labor practices" such as teamwork and competition within a set of rules upon the Mexican workers. In 1902, a five-clubs league emerged with a strong English influence. Many of the early football clubs were affiliated with corporations. In 1902, the first amateur football league created in Mexico was the Liga Mexicana de Football Amateur Association, organized by a group of football supporters known as Asociación de Aficionados de México en la Liga de Football (The Mexico Amateur Association in the Football League). In 1920, the Liga Nacional was created by Real Club España as a separatist league. However, only two seasons were played before its merger with the Liga Mexicana in 1922 to create the first governing body of football in Mexico, which was named as Federación de Football Asociación (Federation of Football Association). The following year, it was renamed as Federación Central de Fútbol (Central Football Federation) until its dissolution in 1927. From 1922 to 1927, the Campeonato de Primera Fuerza was the league competition organized by the defunct federation.

=== Official FMF ===
In 1927 after a restructuring and renewal, the current Federación Mexicana de Fútbol (FMF) was officially established and later affiliated with FIFA in 1929 and a founding member of CONCACAF in 1961. From 1946 to 1961, the FMF was a member of the NAFC, a defunct regional confederation for the North American Zone and a predecessor confederation of CONCACAF. The federation was also a member of the PFC, a defunct intercontinental confederation of the Americas which consisted of NAFC, CCCF and CONMEBOL.

During the amateur era of Mexican football, the FMF organized the two most important competitions in the country (league and cup). From 1927 to 1942, the FMF took charge of organizing the Campeonato de Primera Fuerza and renamed it Liga Mayor in 1931. In 1932, the federation created its first domestic cup tournament named as Copa México.

== Stadiums and attendances ==
=== Stadiums with higher capacity ===
Stadiums in Mexico with a capacity of 40,000 or higher:

#	Stadium	Capacity	City	State	Team(s)	Surface	Year opened	Owner	League division	Image
1	Azteca	81,070	Tlalpan	Mexico City	Mexico national team, América, Cruz Azul, Atlante	Grass	1966	Grupo Televisa	Liga MX	
2	Olímpico Universitario	69,000	Coyoacán	Mexico City	Pumas UNAM	Grass	1952	UNAM	Liga MX	
3	Jalisco	55,020	Guadalajara	Jalisco	Atlas, Leones Negros UdeG	Grass	1960	Clubes Unidos de Jalisco	Liga MX, Liga de Expansión MX	
4	BBVA	51,348	Guadalupe	Nuevo León	Monterrey	Grass	2015	FEMSA	Liga MX	
5	Cuauhtémoc	47,417	Puebla City	Puebla	Puebla	Grass	1968	State of Puebla	Liga MX	
6	Akron	46,232	Zapopan	Jalisco	Guadalajara, Tapatío	Grass	2010	Grupo Omnilife	Liga MX, Liga de Expansión MX	
7	Universitario	41,886	San Nicolás de los Garza	Nuevo León	Tigres UANL	Grass	1967	UANL	Liga MX	

=== Attendances ===
The average attendance per Liga MX season and the club with the highest average attendance in recent seasons:

Season	Tournament	League average	Club with the highest average	Club average
2024–25	Clausura	21,548	América	44,821
2024–25	Apertura	20,105	América	42,702
2023–24	Clausura	23,342	Monterrey	43,356
2023–24	Apertura	20,651	Tigres UANL	39,904
2022–23	Clausura	23,160	Monterrey	43,588
2022–23	Apertura	20,533	Tigres UANL	40,831

== See also ==
- Mexican Football Federation
- Mexico national football team
- Mexico national under-23 football team
- Mexico national under-20 football team
- Mexico national under-17 football team
- Mexico women's national football team
- Mexico women's national under-20 football team
- Mexico women's national under-17 football team
- Mexican football league system
- Women's football in Mexico
- List of football clubs in Mexico
- List of Mexican football champions
- List of football clubs in Mexico by major honours won
- Mexican football clubs in international competitions
