= Halcones F.C. (Mexico) =

Mexican association football club

- Full name: Halcones Fútbol Club
- Nickname: Halcones
- Founded: 12 June 2020; 6 years ago
- Ground: Unidad Deportiva Hermanos López Rayón; Uruapan, Michoacán
- Capacity: 5,000
- Owner: Dante Eludier Vargas Caro
- Chairman: Ulises Zurita
- Manager: Vacant
- League: Liga Premier (Serie A)
- 2025–26: Regular phase: 4th (Group II); Final phase: Semifinals
Home colours	Away colours

Halcones Fútbol Club, formerly Club Deportivo Zap and Halcones de Zapopan, is a Mexican professional football club based in Uruapan, Michoacán which originally competed in the Liga de Balompié Mexicano, and in July 2021, it was affiliated into Liga Premier – Serie A, the third level division of Mexican football.

== History ==
In May 2020, the team began its registration to be part of the inaugural season of the Liga de Balompié Mexicano. On June 12, their incorporation into the new league was announced and became official, in addition to announcing the Estadio Tres de Marzo in Zapopan, Jalisco as their home stadium. On June 20, Jorge Hernández González was announced as the first team's manager. On July 18, Jesús Roberto Chávez was presented as the first player in the club's history.

On December 30, 2020, the team withdrew from the season due to economic and financial problems, planning to come back next season as long as the league had adjustments in its structure and had financial stability, however, on January 12, 2021, the team left the LBM due to a lack of compliance with the league board and announced their goal of seeking to join another competition.

On June 1, 2021, the club announced changes in its structure, the team was renamed Club Deportivo Zap and was relocated to Zapotlanejo, Jalisco, 45 km from its original location, this with the aim of obtaining its affiliation to the Segunda División de México, affiliated with the Federación Mexicana de Fútbol (FMF). On July 30, 2021, the team was confirmed as a member of the Serie A, being placed in Group 2.

On May 25, 2022, the club returned to its original name, Halcones de Zapopan.

In June 2024, the team was renamed Halcones F.C. after a change of ownership, in addition to being relocated to the city of Querétaro.

On August 20, 2024, the team won its first championship by being champion of the Copa Promesas MX, also being the first winner in the history of the competition.

On July 31, 2025, the team was relocated to Uruapan, Michoacán due to operational decisions.

In August 2026, the team suspended its participation in the Liga Premier and ceded its spot in the league to H2O Purépechas F.C., as Halcones lacked the suitable facilities in Uruapan required for promotion and did not receive authorization to relocate its home base to Morelia.

== Stadium ==
The Estadio de la Unidad Deportiva Hermanos López Rayón is a multi-use stadium in Uruapan, Michoacán. It is currently used mostly for football matches and is the home stadium for Halcones F.C. and Aguacateros CDU. The stadium has a capacity of 6,000 people.

== Honors ==
- Copa Promesas MX Champions: 1

2024

== Players ==
=== First-team squad ===
As of 13 January 2026

Note: Flags indicate national team as defined under FIFA eligibility rules; some limited exceptions apply. Players may hold more than one non-FIFA nationality.

No.	Pos.	Nation	Player
2	DF	MEX	Jordy Pizano
4	DF	MEX	Luis Camarena
5	DF	MEX	Cristóbal Aguilera
6	MF	MEX	Marco González
7	MF	USA	Manuel Guzmán
8	FW	MEX	Gerson Vázquez
9	FW	MEX	Alejandro Frausto
10	MF	MEX	Abel Muñoz
11	FW	ARG	Lucas Cantón
12	GK	MEX	Ronaldo Gutiérrez
13	FW	MEX	Daniel Valencia
14	DF	MEX	Farid Hurtado
15	DF	MEX	Salvador Arzate
16	DF	MEX	Francisco Jaramillo

No.	Pos.	Nation	Player
17	MF	MEX	Moisés Juárez
18	FW	MEX	Ramón Salas
19	MF	MEX	Christopher Padilla
20	DF	MEX	Luis Menera
21	GK	MEX	Joshua Reyes
22	FW	MEX	José Pahua
23	DF	MEX	Cristopher Molina
24	DF	MEX	Jesús González
25	DF	MEX	Emmanuel Villa
28	GK	MEX	Alex Cruz
29	MF	MEX	Sagir Arce
33	FW	MEX	Axel Silva
36	DF	MEX	Roberto Enciso

=== Reserve teams ===
GDL United
Reserve team that plays in the Liga TDP, the fourth level of the Mexican league system.

Halcones AFU
Reserve team that plays in the Liga TDP, the fourth level of the Mexican league system.

== Managers ==
- (Mexico) Jorge Hernández (2021–2022)
- (Mexico) Héctor Medrano (2022)
- (Mexico) Jesús Cota (2023)
- (Mexico) Óscar Romero (2023–2024)
- (Mexico) Carlos Salcido (2024)
- (Mexico) José Roberto Muñoz (2025)
- (Mexico) Carlos Alberto Montaño (2025–2026)
- (Mexico) Rodolfo Vilchis (2026)
