= Santiago F.C. =

- Full name: Santiago Fútbol Club
- Nickname: La Chaguiza
- Founded: August 2017; 9 years ago
- Ground: La Capilla Soccer Park; Allende, Nuevo León
- Capacity: 1,000
- Owner: José Celestino Martínez
- Chairman: José Celestino Martínez
- Manager: Martín Moreno
- League: Liga Premier (Premier A)
- 2025–26: Liga Premier (Serie A); Regular phase: 2nd (Group II); Final phase: Reclassification
Home colours	Away colours

Santiago F.C. is a Mexican football club based in Allende, Nuevo León that competes in the Premier A, the intermediate branch of the Liga Premier de México, the third division level of Mexican football.

== History ==
The team was founded in 2017 as FCD Bulls de Santiago, a team associated with a soccer school owned by the Texan team FC Dallas, the school was based in Santiago, Nuevo León, a town integrated into the Monterrey metropolitan area, due to their relationship, the team could send footballers to train in the minor leagues of the United States. Since its foundation the team was registered in the Tercera División de México.

In 2022, the team ended its direct relationship with FC Dallas, but maintaining an alliance agreement, for which it was renamed Santiago Fútbol Club, although maintaining the place and rights to play in the Tercera División.

On July 18, 2023, the team was promoted to the Liga Premier – Serie B. Santiago F.C. then acquired the Mazorqueros F.C. franchise, place that had been left free after the dissolution and relocation of that team to the state of Nuevo León, thus Santiago F.C. managed to improve its position in Mexican football. However, for administrative reasons, the Liga Premier team is officially named Club de Fútbol Santiago, although the club maintains the original name on its uniforms, shields, communications and other graphic identities.

In the 2024–25 season, the club won both tournaments, thus achieving promotion to the Liga Premier – Serie A.

== Honors ==
- Serie B de México Champions: 2

Apertura 2024
Clausura 2025

- Copa Conecta Champions: 1

2025

== Players ==
=== First-team squad ===
As of 6 September 2026

Note: Flags indicate national team as defined under FIFA eligibility rules; some limited exceptions apply. Players may hold more than one non-FIFA nationality.

No.	Pos.	Nation	Player
2	DF	MEX	José Macías
3	DF	COL	Edson Acevedo
4	DF	MEX	César Ruiz
6	MF	MEX	José Ángel Rodríguez
7	DF	MEX	Johan Rodríguez
8	DF	MEX	Érick Ávalos
9	FW	MEX	Sergio Gámez
10	MF	MEX	Luis Chairez
11	FW	MEX	Juan Jesús Noguez
12	GK	MEX	Jesús Tamayo
14	FW	USA	Romario Domínguez
15	DF	MEX	Kevin Cedillo
17	MF	MEX	Pablo Sánchez (on loan from Monterrey)
18	MF	MEX	José Ontiveros
19	MF	MEX	Bryan Romero

No.	Pos.	Nation	Player
20	FW	MEX	Josué Morales
21	DF	MEX	Mauricio Morales
22	MF	MEX	Pedro Cárdenas
23	DF	MEX	Lenin Francés
25	DF	MEX	Antouan Hernández
26	FW	MEX	Edson Cárdenas
27	MF	MEX	Diego Luna
28	FW	MEX	José Martínez
29	GK	MEX	Érick González
30	MF	MEX	Ernesto Contreras
31	MF	MEX	Fabián Salas
35	MF	MEX	Kleber Cano
36	FW	MEX	Gabriel Uresti
39	MF	MEX	José Treviño
40	MF	MEX	Rodrigo Ramos

== Reserves ==
=== Santiago TDP ===
Reserve team that plays in the Liga TDP, the fourth level of Mexican football.
