= Inter Playa del Carmen =

- Full name: Club Deportivo Inter Playa del Carmen
- Nicknames: El Inter; El equipo de Quintana Roo (The Quintana Roo's Team)
- Founded: 31 August 1999; 27 years ago
- Ground: Unidad Deportiva Mario Villanueva Madrid
- Capacity: 7,500
- Owner: Club Deportivo Inter Playa del Carmen A.C.
- Chairman: Patricia Fajardo Sánchez
- Manager: José Luis Trejo
- League: Liga Premier (Primera Premier)
- 2025–26: Regular phase: 5th of 13 (Group III); Final phase: Quarter-finals
Home colours	Away colours

Club Deportivo Inter Playa del Carmen, simply known as Inter Playa, is a professional football club based in Playa del Carmen, Quintana Roo. The club competes in Liga Premier (Primera Premier), the third level of Mexican football, and plays its home matches at Unidad Deportiva Mario Villanueva Madrid. Founded in 1999 by an agreement between local businessmen and the municipal government.

== History ==
Inter Playa participated in the Tercera División from 1999 to 2003, the club was crowned as champions of the Torneo Clausura, which allowed it to be promoted to the Segunda División. Since its promotion in 2003, the team has remained in the same professional category.

On 18 December 2021, Inter Playa reaches the grand final of the Liga Premier Apertura 2021 tournament for the first time in its history, losing to Alacranes de Durango.

On 13 March 2023, Inter Playa defeated Club Calor to win the Copa Conecta Championship on the road in Monclova. Marea Azul(Blue Tide) took a bus from PDC to Monclova to cheer on their team. The fan club brought their drums and enjoyed a well deserved victory.

It currently has two professional categories. In the Liga Premier, the coach is Carlos Bracamontes, with whom Inter Playa had 77% effectiveness in the 2021-2022 football year.

In the Tercera División the manager was Alejandro Jácome, with whom the team managed to advance from the first round of the final phase since 2003, the year in which the club was promoted.

Inter Playa del Carmen has a rivalry with Pioneros de Cancún due to the geographical proximity and both cities compete in the tourism sector, the game is known as Quintanarroense Classic.

== Honours ==
Domestic
Type	Competition	Titles	Seasons	Runners-up
Lower levels FMF	Liga Premier	0	—	Ape–2021, Cla–2023
Lower levels FMF	Tercera División	1	Cla–2003	—
Lower levels FMF	Copa Conecta	1	2023	—

== Players ==
=== Current squad ===
As of 8 September 2026

Note: Flags indicate national team as defined under FIFA eligibility rules; some limited exceptions apply. Players may hold more than one non-FIFA nationality.

No.	Pos.	Nation	Player
1	GK	MEX	Brandon Muñiz
2	DF	MEX	Daniel Blanco
3	DF	MEX	Carlos Pérez
4	DF	MEX	Josué Hernández
5	MF	MEX	Gabriel Flores
6	MF	MEX	Néstor de la Cruz
7	DF	MEX	Neri Amezcua
8	MF	MEX	Fernando Laymon
9	FW	MEX	Moisés Villatoro
10	MF	MEX	Miguel Guzmán
11	FW	MEX	Arturo Martín del Campo
13	DF	MEX	Édgar Hernández
13	MF	MEX	Daniel Hernández
15	DF	MEX	Enrique de la Paz
16	MF	ARG	Lautaro Barraza

No.	Pos.	Nation	Player
17	MF	MEX	Héctor Pedroza
18	FW	MEX	Santiago Rey
19	FW	MEX	Carlos Prieto
20	MF	MEX	Tadeo Mundo
21	DF	MEX	Víctor Solano
22	MF	MEX	Dylan Torres
23	MF	MEX	Manuel Caamal
24	DF	MEX	Cristopher Vázquez
25	GK	MEX	Gastón Santos
26	MF	MEX	Leonardo Sánchez
27	MF	MEX	Leonardo Herrera
28	MF	MEX	Mario Hurtado
29	MF	MEX	Alejandro Alarcón
33	GK	MEX	Leonardo Palestina
50	GK	MEX	Santiago Galán

== Reserves ==
=== Inter Playa TDP ===
Reserve team that competes in the Liga TDP.

== Competitive record ==
Torneo	Tier	Position	Matches	Wins	Draws	Losses	GF (Note: Goals for / scored)	GA (Note: Goals against / conceded)
Apertura 2011	Liga Premier	5th/SF	14	9	1	4	25	17
Clausura 2012	Liga Premier	18th	14	6	0	8	17	21
Apertura 2012	Liga Premier	20th	15	5	3	7	18	23
Clausura 2013	Liga Premier	22nd	15	2	5	8	12	17
Apertura 2013	Liga Premier	20th	14	4	7	3	10	8
Clausura 2014	Liga Premier	18th	14	5	3	6	16	19
Apertura 2014	Liga Premier	24th	13	2	4	7	17	24
Clausura 2015	Liga Premier	2nd/QF	13	8	1	4	20	13
Apertura 2015	Liga Premier	27th	15	4	7	4	16	16
Clausura 2016	Liga Premier	11th	15	8	3	4	24	17
Apertura 2016	Liga Premier	24th	15	6	3	6	23	20
Clausura 2017	Liga Premier	11th/QF	15	8	2	5	26	19
Apertura 2017	Serie A	13th/QF	17	7	5	5	28	23
Clausura 2018	Serie A	5th/QF	17	8	7	2	23	14
2018-19 Season	Serie A	16th	30	13	8	9	35	30
2020-21	Serie A	2nd/SF	24	16	4	4	55	17
Apertura 2021	Serie A	5th/RU	12	8	3	1	36	7
Totals	x	x	272	119	73	80	401	305

Old Crest
