= Purépechas F.C. =

Mexican football club

Purépechas
- Full name: Purépechas Fútbol Club
- Founded: 25 July 2021; 5 years ago (as H2O Purépechas Fútbol Club)
- Stadium: Estadio Venustiano Carranza
- Capacity: 17,600
- Owner: Axen Capital
- Chairman: Raúl Ramírez
- Manager: Efrén Galván
- League: Liga Premier (Primera Premier)
- 2026–27: TBD
Home colours	Away colours

Purépechas Fútbol Club is a professional football club based in Morelia, Michoacán. The club competes in Liga Premier (Primera Premier), the third level of Mexican football, and plays its home matches at Estadio Venustiano Carranza. Founded in 2021, the club has its origins in the Club Deportivo H2O, which was an amateur team managed by the Morelia water and sewerage management body.

== History ==
On August 2021, an agreement was reached between the sports club, Axen Capital, a financial company and Atlético Morelia to register the team in the Liga TDP, the fourth category of Mexican football. The team is managed by Axen Capital, but the majority of its players came from Atlético Morelia's youth squads, as H2O Purépechas served as their affiliate team between 2021 and 2024.

The team officially debuted on September 25, 2021, defeating Atlético Chavinda 2–0.

In October 2021, the team began playing its home matches at Estadio Venustiano Carranza, after having played its first matches at a local sports complex.

In September 2024, Atlético Morelia established its own reserves team in Liga TDP after signing an agreement with the Universidad Michoacana de San Nicolás de Hidalgo, causing H2O Purépechas to become a team independent of Atlético's structure.

In August 2026, the team joined the Primera Premier, the main branch of the Liga Premier de México, after taking the spot vacated in the league by Halcones F.C., a team that shared partial ownership with H2O. As a result of this move, the team returned to playing at the Estadio Venustiano Carranza in Morelia. Before the start of the 2026–27 season, the team underwent a rebranding, dropping the word "H2O" from its name and becoming known simply as Purépechas F.C.

== Stadium ==
Estadio Olimpico Venustiano Carranza is a multi-use stadium in Morelia, Mexico, used mostly for football matches and also for athletics. It was initially used as the stadium of Atletico Morelia matches. It was replaced by Estadio Morelos when Atletico Morelia moved there in 1989. The capacity of the stadium is 17,600 spectators.

== Players ==
=== First-team squad ===
As of 1 September 2026

Note: Flags indicate national team as defined under FIFA eligibility rules; some limited exceptions apply. Players may hold more than one non-FIFA nationality.

No.	Pos.	Nation	Player
1	GK	MEX	Bryan González
2	DF	MEX	Jared Estrada
3	DF	MEX	Juan David Morales
4	DF	MEX	Rafael Ortiz
5	DF	MEX	Alejandro Garibay
6	MF	MEX	Alejandro Anzar
7	MF	USA	Manuel Guzmán
8	MF	MEX	Alan López
9	MF	MEX	Francisco Rivas
10	MF	MEX	José Pahua
11	DF	MEX	Luis Camarena
12	DF	MEX	Néstor García

No.	Pos.	Nation	Player
13	DF	MEX	Juan David Morales
14	DF	MEX	Emiliano Soria
15	MF	MEX	Cristóbal Escutia
16	MF	MEX	Ángel Bojorquez
18	DF	MEX	Raúl Fuentes
19	FW	MEX	Ronaldo Alejandre
21	MF	MEX	Bryan Pérez
22	DF	MEX	Rafael Campos
23	FW	MEX	Luis Soto
27	GK	MEX	Julián Balderas
29	FW	MEX	Edwin Ortega
44	MF	MEX	Brandon García

== Reserves ==
=== Purépechas TDP ===
Reserve team that plays in the Liga TDP, the fourth level of Mexican football.
