= Estadio Mario Villanueva Madrid =

Stadium in Carmen, Mexico

Coordinates: 20°38′5.308″N 87°04′13.738″W

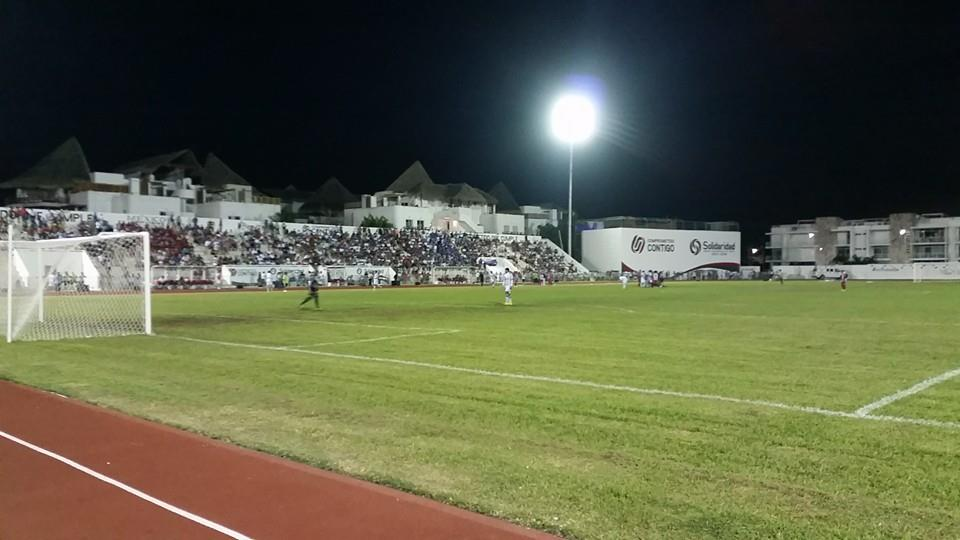
- Unidad Deportiva Mario Villanueva Madrid at night
- Interactive map of Estadio Mario Villanueva Madrid
- Full name: Estadio de la Unidad Deportiva Mario Villanueva Madrid
- Location: Playa del Carmen, Quintana Roo, Mexico
- Owner: Government of Quintana Roo
- Operator: Inter Playa del Carmen
- Capacity: 7,500
- Surface: Grass
- Scoreboard: No
- Field size: 105 m × 68 m (115 yd × 74 yd)

Construction
- Groundbreaking: 1999
- Built: 1999
- Opened: 1999

Tenant
- Inter Playa del Carmen (1999–present)

Estadio de la Unidad Deportiva Mario Villanueva Madrid is a stadium in Playa del Carmen, Quintana Roo, Mexico. It is primarily used for soccer, and is the home field of the Inter Playa del Carmen soccer team in Mexico's third division. It holds 7,500 people and features a natural grass surface.

The stadium was to host all Group B matches for the 2010 CONCACAF Women's Gold Cup, but a last-minute change moved those games to the Estadio Quintana Roo in Cancún.

== See also ==
- Mario Villanueva Madrid, governor of Quintana Roo from 1993 to 1999
