= Estadio Valentín González =

Multi-purpose stadium in Mexico City, Mexico

- Interactive map of Estadio Valentín González
- Full name: Estadio Valentín González
- Location: Xochimilco, Mexico City, Mexico
- Coordinates: 19°15′12″N 99°06′25″W
- Owner: Xochimilco City Council
- Operator: Xochimilco City Council
- Capacity: 2,500
- Surface: Grass

Construction
- Opened: 1964

Tenants
- Marina (2014–2018); Sporting Canamy (2015–2016); Atlético Capitalino (2021); CDM (2023–2025); Olimpo (2023–2025)

The Estadio Valentín González is a multi-use stadium located in Xochimilco, Mexico City, Mexico. It is mainly used for football matches and currently has a capacity for approximately 2,500 spectators.

In 2021, it was designated as the official pitch of Atlético Capitalino, a club that competed in the Liga de Balompié Mexicano. However, due to disagreements with the Xochimilco government over the use of the property, the team was only able to play one game at the venue, forcing it to change venues again in the middle of the season.

In 2023, it was the stadium chosen as its new ground by CDM F.C., a team from the Liga Premier de México – Serie B, so the Valentín González once again hosted professional matches.

Most of its history the stadium has only been used for a few matches, mainly in the amateur category, as well as for various events in general throughout the year.
