= Irving Rubirosa =

Mexican footballer and manager (born 1979)

Personal information
- Full name: Irving Rubirosa Serrano
- Date of birth: 3 May 1979 (age 47)
- Place of birth: Chimalhuacán, Mexico
- Height: 1.74 m (5 ft 9 in)
- Position: Midfielder

Team information
- Current team: Tigres de Álica (manager)

Senior career*
Years	Team	Apps	(Gls)
1999–2004	Atlante	74	(5)
2004	Jaguares	21	(2)
2004–2005	Morelia	11	(0)
2005	Toluca	0	(0)
2006	León	16	(4)
2006–2007	Jaguares	4	(0)
2007–2008	Monterrey	0	(0)
2008	Indios	5	(0)
2008–2009	Potros Chetumal	6	(0)
2010	Atlante UTN	1	(0)

International career
2003	Mexico	5	(0)

Managerial career
- 2014–2015: Yalmakán
- 2016: Pioneros de Cancún
- 2017–2018: Oaxaca
- 2018: Cafetaleros
- 2020–2021: Tlaxcala
- 2021–2022: Xelajú
- 2025–: Tigres de Álica
- * Club domestic league appearances and goals

Irving Rubirosa Serrano (born 3 May 1979) is a Mexican professional football coach and a former player. Since October 2025 he is the manager of Mexican team Tigres de Álica.

== Career ==
Born in Chimalhuacán, Rubirosa made his Mexican Primera División debut with Atlante F.C. in 1999. He was involved in a player exchange with Chiapas for Fernando Martel in January 2004. He joined Monarcas Morelia in the summer of 2004, and moved to Deportivo Toluca F.C. one year later. Rubirosa returned to Jaguares in the summer of 2006. He joined C.F. Monterrey in 2007, but did not play again in the Primera.

After 10 seasons of senior football, the experienced midfielder joined Primera A side Indios de Ciudad Juárez in January 2008.

Rubirosa made five substitute's appearances for the Mexico national football team in friendlies while Ricardo La Volpe was manager in 2003.

== Honours ==
=== Manager ===
Oaxaca

- Ascenso MX: Apertura 2017
