= Atlético Pachuca =

Mexican association football club

- Full name: Atlético Pachuca
- Founded: 26 February 2021; 5 years ago
- Dissolved: 24 June 2025; 11 months ago
- Ground: Estadio Municipal; Atitalaquía, Hidalgo, Mexico
- Capacity: 3,000
- Owner: Grupo Pachuca
- Chairman: Miguel Ángel Jiménez
- Manager: Fausto Pinto
- League: Liga Premier (Serie B)
- Clausura 2025: Regular season: 2nd Play–offs: Runner–up
Home colours	Away colours	Third colours

Atlético Pachuca was a Mexican professional football team based in Atitalaquía, Hidalgo, which played in the Liga Premier since the 2023–24 season. Between 2021 and 2023 the team played in the Liga TDP. Founded in 2021, it was an affiliate team of C.F. Pachuca.

== History ==
In February 2021, the Pachuca City Council began the procedures to form a representative football team for the city, with the aim of integrating it into social programs to support youth. In its first two seasons in the Liga TDP, the team qualified for the promotion play-offs, although it was eliminated in the first round.

On June 30, 2023, Atlético Pachuca, merged with Pachuca Premier, the C.F. Pachuca reserves team that plays in Liga Premier, after the merger, the team was relocated to Serie B de México where it will compete with the identity, colors and shield of Pachuca Premier, but under the administration and coaching staff of Atlético Pachuca. The new team maintained its status as a reserve team for C.F. Pachuca, so it continued to receive youth players from the main club. On 18 July 2023 the team was relocated to the town of Atitalaquia, although keeping the name of Pachuca in its identity.

In June 2025 C.F. Pachuca decided to rename its reserve team as Atlético Hidalgo, so Atlético Pachuca was dissolved.
