= Estadio Nicolás Álvarez Ortega =

Stadium in Mexico

Coordinates: 21.4925°N 104.8010°W

- El Coloso de Camichín "The Colossus of Camichín"
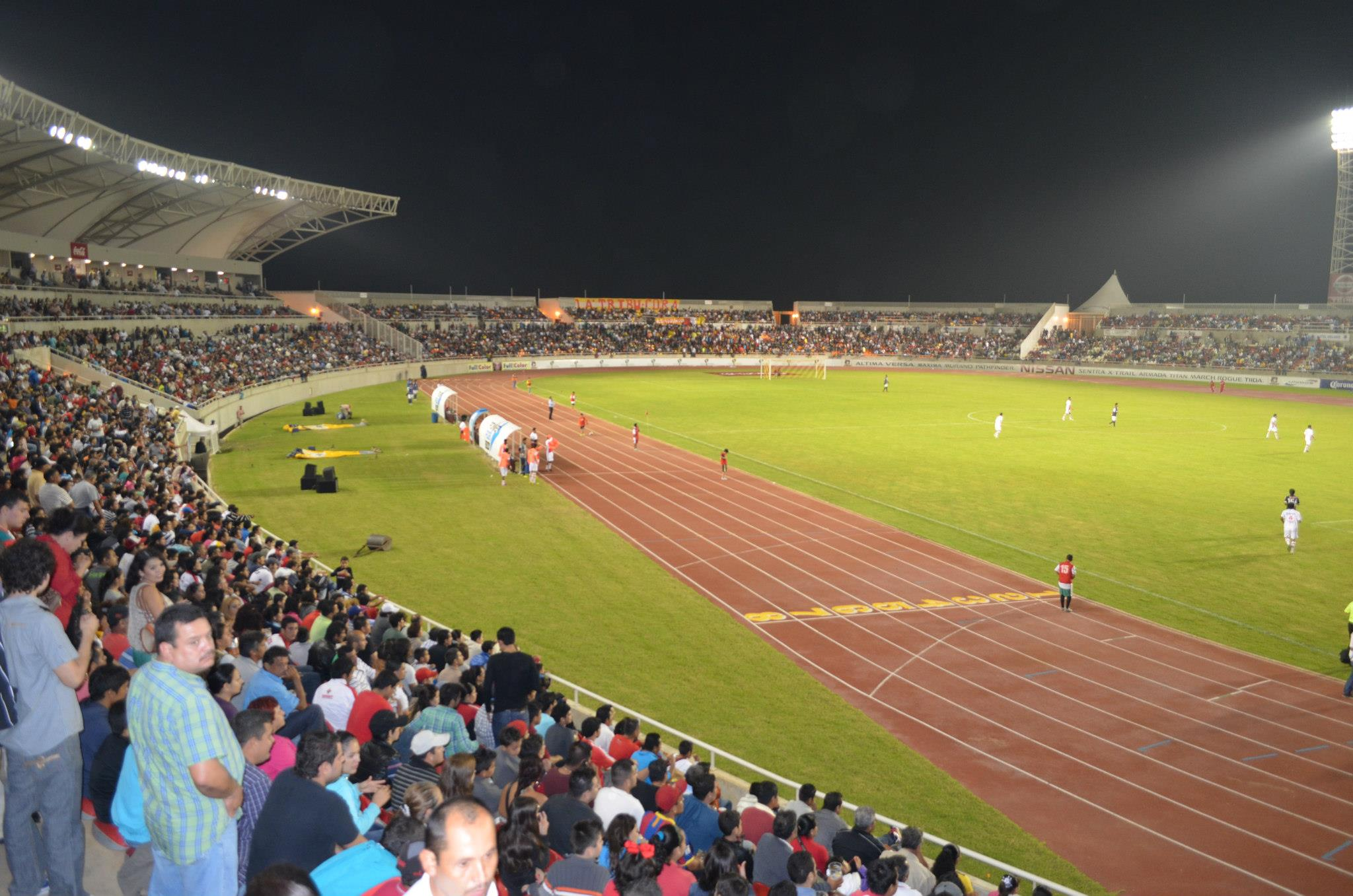
- Interactive map of Estadio Nicolás Álvarez Ortega
- Location: Tepic, Nayarit
- Owner: State of Nayarit
- Capacity: 12,271
- Surface: Grass

Construction
- Opened: June 25, 2011

Tenants
- Coras (2011–2020); Xalisco (2019–2020); Tigres de Alica (2024–present)

The Estadio Nicolás Álvarez Ortega is a multi-use stadium in Tepic, Nayarit, Mexico. It was used mostly for football matches. The stadium has a capacity of 12,271 and opened in 2011.

The stadium started its reconstruction in May, 2025.
