= C.D. Muxes =

Mexican football club

- Full name: Club Deportivo Muxes A.C.
- Nickname: Muxes
- Founded: December 2018; 7 years ago
- Dissolved: 15 July 2026; 33 days ago
- Ground: Deportivo Oceanía, Mexico City, Mexico
- Capacity: 500
- Chairman: Gerardo Ramírez Gandarilla
- Manager: Edgar Carrera
- League: Liga TDP - Group IX
- 2025–26: Regular phase: 5th (Group IX); Final phase: Quarter–finals
- Website: https://clubdeportivomuxes.org/
Home colours	Away colours

Club Deportivo Muxes was a Mexican football club that played in the Liga TDP, the Mexican third division. The club was based in Venustiano Carranza, Mexico City. It was the first professional Mexican football club declared as LGBT.

== History ==
The team was founded in 2018 with the aim of representing the LGBT community that until then had not had a representative club, in addition to generating spaces for the visibility of these groups. In its origins, the team competed in amateur leagues in Mexico City.

In 2020 the team joined the Mexican Football Federation, Subsequently, the club registered in the Liga TDP, being placed in Group IV with other teams from the Greater Mexico City.

On 25 September 2020, the team played its first official match. Muxes defeated FC Politécnico by a score of 0–4. Pablo de la Rosa scored the club's first goal in its history in professional competition.

On 15 July 2026, the club announced its withdrawal from professional competitions without revealing the reasons for the decision.

== See also ==
- Futbol in Mexico
- Mexico City
- Tercera División de México
