= Delfines UGM =

Mexican football club

- Full name: Delfines de la Universidad del Golfo de México
- Nickname: Delfines
- Founded: 2008; 18 years ago
- Ground: UGM Nogales; Nogales, Veracruz, Mexico
- Capacity: 1,500
- Manager: Adrián Becerra
- League: Tercera División de México - Group III
- 2025–26: 4th – Group III (round of 16)
Home colours	Away colours

Delfines UGM is a Mexican football club that plays in the Tercera División de México. The club is based in Nogales, Veracruz, and represents the University of the Gulf of Mexico (Universidad del Golfo de México).

== See also ==
- Football in Mexico
- Veracruz
- Tercera División de México
