= Estadio Los Pinos =

Stadium in Mexico

- Interactive map of Estadio Los Pinos
- Full name: Estadio Municipal Los Pinos
- Location: Cuautitlán, State of Mexico, Mexico
- Coordinates: 19°40′25″N 99°10′44″W
- Owner: Cuautitlán City Council
- Operator: Cuautitlán City Council
- Capacity: 5,000
- Surface: Natural grass

Construction
- Opened: December 1972

Tenants
- SUOO (1973–1993); Truenos de Cuautitlán (1997–1999); Cocoleros de Cuautitlán (1999–2006); Real Cuautitlán (2010–2016); Deportivo Gladiadores (2015–2019); Deportivo Dongu (2019–2024); Huracanes Izcalli (2024–2025); Cordobés (2025–present)

The Estadio Los Pinos is a multi-use stadium in Cuautitlán, State of Mexico, Mexico. It is currently used mostly for football matches and is the home stadium for Cordobés F.C. The stadium has a capacity of 5,000 people.
