= Cordobés F.C. =

Cordobés
- Full name: Cordobés Fútbol Club
- Founded: July 2022; 4 years ago
- Ground: Estadio Los Pinos
- Capacity: 5,000
- Owner: Juan Manuel Chong
- Chairman: Juan Manuel Chong
- Manager: Alejandro Estrada
- League: Liga Premier (Primera Premier)
- 2025–26: Regular phase: 10th of 14 (Group II); Final phase: Not qualified
Home colours	Away colours

Cordobés Fútbol Club is a professional football club based in Cuautitlán, State of Mexico. The club competes in Liga Premier (Primera Premier), the third level of Mexican football, and plays its home matches at Estadio Los Pinos. Founded in 2022 in Huixquilucan as an educational and sports development project promoted by the newspaper El Heraldo de México.

== History ==
Cordobés was founded in July 2022, since its first season it was registered in the Tercera División, the fourth level of Mexican football.

In the 2023–24 season, the team achieved its best performance in the regular phase of the Tercera División, managing to surpass the mark of 100 goals scored. However, in the play-offs the team was eliminated in the round of 16 by Tuzos Pachuca UFD.

On 28 June 2024, the team achieved promotion to the Liga Premier (Serie B) after the board obtained an expansion franchise in the third tier of Mexican football.

One year later for the 2025–26 season, Cordobés was promoted to Liga Premier – Serie A through an expansion of teams. Because of that promotion on July 28, 2025, the team was relocated from Huixquilucan to Cuautitlán.

== Stadium ==
The Estadio Los Pinos is a multi-use stadium in Cuautitlán, State of Mexico. It is currently used mostly for football matches and is the home stadium for Cordobés. The stadium has a capacity of 5,000 people.

== Players ==
=== First-team squad ===
As of 1 September 2026

Note: Flags indicate national team as defined under FIFA eligibility rules; some limited exceptions apply. Players may hold more than one non-FIFA nationality.

No.	Pos.	Nation	Player
1	GK	MEX	Salvador Escobar
2	DF	MEX	Kevin Herrera
3	DF	MEX	Denilson Rico
4	DF	MEX	Kevin Benítez
5	MF	MEX	Alejandro Hernández
6	DF	MEX	Brandon Herrera
7	MF	MEX	Eduardo Mayen
8	MF	MEX	Yael Valdéz
9	FW	MEX	Emiliano Chong
11	MF	MEX	Marconi Picazo
12	GK	MEX	Aldair Zavala
13	GK	MEX	Dayub Hage
14	MF	MEX	Edwin Arteaga

No.	Pos.	Nation	Player
15	DF	MEX	Luis Neri
16	DF	MEX	André Guerrero
17	MF	MEX	Bernardo Chong
18	DF	MEX	Ian Castañeda
19	FW	MEX	Usiel Robles
20	MF	MEX	Fernando Daniel
21	DF	MEX	Mauricio Escobar
22	MF	MEX	Klever Castillo
24	DF	MEX	Abrahm Freyfeld
25	FW	MEX	Alan Ayrton Delgado
28	FW	MEX	Donovan Olvera
30	DF	MEX	André Santana
33	MF	MEX	Jared Ávila

== Reserves ==
=== Cordobés TDP ===
Reserve team that plays in the Liga TDP, the fourth level of Mexican football.
