= Tigres de Álica F.C. =

Tigres de Álica
- Full name: Tigres de Álica Fútbol Club
- Nickname: Tigres (Tigers)
- Founded: 8 July 2021; 5 years ago
- Ground: Estadio Nicolás Álvarez Ortega
- Capacity: 12,495
- Owner: Grupo Álica
- Chairman: Antonio Echevarría Domínguez
- Manager: Irving Rubirosa
- League: Liga Premier (Primera Premier)
- 2025–26: Regular phase: 2nd of 14 (Group I); Final phase: Reclassification
Home colours	Away colours

Tigres de Álica Fútbol Club is a professional football club based in Tepic, Nayarit. The club competes in Liga Premier (Primera Premier), the third level of Mexican football, and plays its home matches at Estadio Nicolás Álvarez Ortega.

== History ==
The club was founded in July 2021, having been registered in the Liga TDP. In the 2023–24 season, the team managed to qualify for the promotion play-offs for the first time, after finishing in first position in the Group 15. After defeating the clubs Sultanes de Tamazunchale, Obson Dynamo, Aves Blancas and H2O Purépechas, Tigres de Alica achieved promotion to the Liga Premier on May 18, 2024.

On June 28, 2024 the team achieved a place in Serie A due to an expansion of participating clubs in that branch of the Liga Premier. After that event, the team changed its stadium, starting to play in the Estadio Nicolás Álvarez Ortega, the largest sports venue in Tepic.

== Stadium ==
Estadio Nicolás Álvarez Ortega is a football stadium in Tepic, Nayarit. It has a capacity for 12,495 spectators.

== Players ==
=== First-team squad ===
As of 28 August 2026

Note: Flags indicate national team as defined under FIFA eligibility rules; some limited exceptions apply. Players may hold more than one non-FIFA nationality.

No.	Pos.	Nation	Player
1	GK	MEX	Hernán Mendoza
2	DF	MEX	Julio Barragán
3	DF	MEX	Melchor López
4	DF	MEX	Luis Basulto
5	DF	MEX	Andrés Becerra
6	MF	MEX	Pablo Molina
8	MF	MEX	Marcos Romo
9	FW	MEX	Alejandro Salazar
10	MF	MEX	Víctor Barajas
11	FW	MEX	Jesús Talavera
12	MF	MEX	Freddy Veliz
13	GK	MEX	Alex Cruz
14	DF	MEX	Ángel Escobedo
16	DF	MEX	Diego Modesto

No.	Pos.	Nation	Player
17	MF	MEX	Ernesto Castillo
18	DF	MEX	Isaac Mora
19	DF	MEX	Ricardo Santana
20	MF	MEX	Sahid Durán
21	MF	MEX	Marco Ruíz
22	DF	MEX	Martín Montes
25	MF	MEX	Bryant Navarro
26	MF	COL	Juan David Martínez
28	DF	MEX	Jesús Tobie
29	MF	MEX	Daniel Martínez
30	FW	COL	Sebastián Prieto
33	MF	MEX	Ion Arrese
—	MF	MEX	Luis Araujo

== Reserves ==
=== Tigres de Álica TDP ===
Reserve team that plays in the Liga TDP, the fourth level of Mexican football.

== Managers ==
- (Mexico) Martín Rojas (2021–2023)
- (Mexico) Levi Flores (2023–2024)
- (Mexico) Omar Ávila (2024)
- (Mexico) Hugo López (2024–2025)
- (Mexico) Ricardo Jiménez (2025)
- (Mexico) Irving Rubirosa (2025–)
