= Mexican football league system =

Six professional divisions, men's and women's levels

The Mexican football league system is organized, controlled and regulated by the Federación Mexicana de Fútbol (FMF), except for Liga MX and Liga Femenil organized independently by the Liga Mexicana de Fútbol Profesional (English: Mexican Professional Football League), which is a civil association operating within the federation's legal framework, it is composed of the 18 Liga MX clubs and the FMF. The league system consist of six professional leagues (four levels for men and two levels for women).

In addition to having other national competitions, Campeón de Campeones is a domestic super cup contested by the two Liga MX champions of the season, and the Campeón de Campeones de la Liga de Expansión MX is the super cup for the second level league. Until 2020, the Copa MX was the domestic cup tournament for clubs in the Liga MX and Ascenso MX. The Copa Conecta is the domestic cup tournament for clubs in the Liga Premier and Liga TDP.

== Men's professional leagues ==
Liga MX is the highest level of Mexican football, consists of 18 participating clubs. Each season is split into two tournaments known as Apertura and Clausura. The champions of each tournament are defined in a final knockout phase consisting of eight clubs, commonly known as Liguilla. Since 2020, the promotion and relegation between Liga MX and Liga de Expansión MX has been suspended.

The men's football league system consists of four professional leagues.

Level	League	Organizing body
1	Liga MX (18 clubs)	Liga Mexicana de Fútbol Profesional
↓↑ Promotion and relegation suspended
2	Liga de Expansión MX (16 clubs)	Federación Mexicana de Fútbol
↓↑ Relegation suspended		Federación Mexicana de Fútbol
3	Liga Premier (48 clubs)	Federación Mexicana de Fútbol
↓↑ 4 clubs		Federación Mexicana de Fútbol
4	Liga TDP (247 clubs)	Federación Mexicana de Fútbol

=== International competitions ===
- CONCACAF Champions Cup (6 clubs):

The champions and runners-up of the Apertura and Clausura tournaments, and the best two clubs in the accumulated table points of the season.

- Leagues Cup (18 clubs):

All Liga MX clubs.

- Campeones Cup (1 club):

The winners of the Campeón de Campeones of the season.

== Women's professional leagues ==
The women's football league system consist of two professional leagues. Another non-professional women's league organized in parallel is the Liga Mexicana de Fútbol Femenil organized by LIMEFFE since 2007.

Level	League	Organizing body
1	Liga Femenil (18 clubs)	Liga Mexicana de Fútbol Profesional
↓↑ Promotion and relegation do not exist
2	Liga TDP Femenil (52 clubs)	Federación Mexicana de Fútbol

=== International competitions ===
- CONCACAF W Champions Cup (3 clubs):

The champions of the Apertura and Clausura tournaments, and the best runners-up of the season.

== See also ==
- Football in Mexico
- Women's football in Mexico
- Mexican Football Federation
- Liga MX
- Liga de Expansión MX
- Liga Premier
- Liga TDP
- Liga Femenil
- List of football clubs in Mexico
- List of Mexican football champions
