= 2021–22 Liga TDP season =

Liga TDP
- Season: 2021–22
- Dates: 9 September 2021 – 3 June 2022
- Champions: Mazorqueros (1st title)
- Matches: 2,518
- Goals: 7,736 (3.07 per match)
- Top goalscorer: Ángel Alejandro Crespo (32 goals)
- Stats are from the regular season only

The 2021–22 Liga TDP season is the fourth-tier football league of Mexico. The tournament began on 9 September 2021 and finished on 3 June 2022.

== Competition format ==
The Tercera División (Third Division) is divided into 17 groups. For the 2009–2010 season, the format of the tournament has been reorganized to a home and away format, which all teams will play in their respective group. The 17 groups consist of teams which are eligible to play in the liguilla de ascenso for three promotion spots, teams who are affiliated with teams in the Liga MX, Liga de Expansión MX and Liga Premier and development teams, which are not eligible for promotion but will play that who the better team in a sixteen team filial playoff tournament for the entire season.

The league format allows participating franchises to rent their place to another team, so some clubs compete with a different name than the one registered with the FMF.

For the 2021–22 season there will be three promotions to the Liga Premier. Two to Serie A and one to Serie B.

== Group 1 ==
Group with 12 teams from Campeche, Quintana Roo, Tabasco and Yucatán. NOTE: Puerto Aventuras (registered as Tulum) participated in the first half of the season, but withdrew from the league in January 2022 due to financial problems.

Location of teams in the 2021–22 Liga TDP Group 1 (Campeche)
Location of teams in the 2021–22 Liga TDP Group 1 (Quintana Roo)
Location of teams in the 2021–22 Liga TDP Group 1 (Tabasco)
Location of teams in the 2021–22 Liga TDP Group 1 (Yucatán)

=== Teams ===
Team	City	Home ground	Capacity	Affiliate	Official Name
Campeche	Campeche, Campeche	La Muralla de Kin-Ha	500	—	—
Cantera Venados	Mérida, Yucatán	Carlos Iturralde	15,087	Venados	—
Chetumal	Chetumal, Quintana Roo	José López Portillo	6,600	–	–
Corsarios de Campeche	Campeche, Campeche	Universitario de Campeche	4,000	—	—
Deportiva Venados	Tamanché, Yucatán	Alonso Diego Molina	2,500	—	—
Inter Playa del Carmen	Playa del Carmen, Quintana Roo	Unidad Deportiva Mario Villanueva Madrid	7,500	Inter Playa del Carmen	—
Mayas Hunucmá	Telchac Pueblo, Yucatán	Campo San Pedro Telchac	300	—	—
Pejelagartos de Tabasco	Villahermosa, Tabasco	Ciudad Deportiva de Villahermosa	1,000	—	—
Pioneros Junior	Cancún, Quintana Roo	Cancún 86	6,390	Pioneros de Cancún	—
Progreso	Progreso, Yucatán	20 de Noviembre	3,000	Venados	—
Puerto Aventuras	Puerto Aventuras, Quintana Roo	Unidad Deportiva Puerto Maya	1,000	—	Tulum
Yucatán	Valladolid, Yucatán	Coronel Claudio Alcocer	2,000	–	–

=== League table ===
Pos	Team	Pld	W	D	L	GF	GA	GD	Pts	Qualification or relegation
1	Deportiva Venados	20	16	4	0	52	11	+41	55	Advance to Liguilla de Ascenso
2	Cantera Venados	20	11	6	3	34	20	+14	42	Advance to Liguilla de No Ascenso
3	Inter Playa del Carmen	20	10	6	4	35	20	+15	39	Advance to Liguilla de Ascenso
4	Corsarios de Campeche	20	8	7	5	21	18	+3	35	Advance to Liguilla de Ascenso
5	Pioneros Junior	20	9	4	7	38	27	+11	32	Advance to Liguilla de Ascenso
6	Progreso	20	8	4	8	30	28	+2	30	
7	Campeche	20	8	3	9	22	31	−9	29	
8	Chetumal	20	6	4	10	27	36	−9	23	
9	Pejelagartos de Tabasco	20	6	4	10	18	27	−9	24	
10	Mayas Hunucmá	20	2	6	12	18	38	−20	15	
11	Yucatán	20	1	2	17	10	49	−39	6	

Updated to match(es) played on 23 April 2022. Source: Liga TDP

== Group 2 ==
Group with 11 teams from Chiapas and Oaxaca.

=== Teams ===
Location of teams in the 2021–22 Liga TDP Group 2 (Chiapas)
Location of teams in the 2021–22 Liga TDP Group 2 (Oaxaca)

Team	City	Home ground	Capacity	Affiliate	Official name
Alebrijes de Oaxaca	Oaxaca City, Oaxaca	Tecnológico de Oaxaca	14,598	Alebrijes de Oaxaca	–
Antequera	Oaxaca City, Oaxaca	General Manuel Cabrera Carrasquedo	3,000	–	–
Atlético Ixtepec	Ixtepec, Oaxaca	Brena Torres	1,000	—	–
CEFOR Chiapas	Tuxtla Gutiérrez, Chiapas	Flor de Sospo	3,000	–	–
Cruz Azul Lagunas	Lagunas, Oaxaca	Cruz Azul	2,000	Cruz Azul	–
Dragones de Oaxaca	Zimatlán de Álvarez, Oaxaca	Unidad Deportiva Ignacio Mejía	1,000	–	–
Lechuzas UPGCH	Tuxtla Gutiérrez, Chiapas	Flor de Sospo	3,000	–	–
Milenarios de Oaxaca	Oaxaca City, Oaxaca	General Manuel Cabrera Carrasquedo	3,000	–	–
Saraguatos de Palenque	Palenque, Chiapas	Rey Pakal	1,000	–	Atlético Altamira
UNICACH	Acala, Chiapas	Prof. Romeo González Espinoza	1,000	–	–
Universidad del Sureste	Comitán de Domínguez, Chiapas	Centro de Formación UDS	500	—	—

=== League table ===
Pos	Team	Pld	W	D	L	GF	GA	GD	Pts	Qualification or relegation
1	Lechuzas UPGCH	20	12	6	2	32	13	+19	44	Advance to Liguilla de Ascenso
2	Alebrijes de Oaxaca	20	12	5	3	39	17	+22	43	Advance to Liguilla de No Ascenso
3	Cruz Azul Lagunas	20	12	3	5	44	17	+27	41	Advance to Liguilla de Ascenso
4	Universidad del Sureste	20	8	8	4	23	15	+8	38	Advance to Liguilla de Ascenso
5	UNICACH	20	9	5	6	26	16	+10	35	Advance to Liguilla de Ascenso
6	Dragones de Oaxaca	20	8	7	5	32	25	+7	32	
7	Milenarios de Oaxaca	20	6	4	10	19	31	−12	26	
8	CEFOR Chiapas	20	7	2	11	20	29	−9	24	
9	Antequera	20	5	4	11	18	36	−18	20	
10	Atlético Ixtepec	20	2	5	13	21	38	−17	14	
11	Saraguatos de Palenque	20	3	3	14	12	49	−37	13	

Updated to match(es) played on 23 April 2022. Source: Liga TDP

== Group 3 ==
Group with 15 teams from Puebla, San Luis Potosí, Tlaxcala and Veracruz.

=== Teams ===
Location of teams in the 2021–22 Liga TDP Group 3 (Puebla)
Location of teams in the 2021–22 Liga TDP Group 3 (Veracruz)

Team	City	Home ground	Capacity	Affiliate	Official Name
Atlético Hilanderos	Xalapa Enríquez, Veracruz	USBI	4,000	—	Toros Huatusco
Caballeros de Córdoba	Córdoba, Veracruz	Rafael Murillo Vidal	3,800	—	—
Delfines UGM	Nogales, Veracruz	UGM Nogales	1,500	—	—
Guerreros de Puebla	Puebla City, Puebla	Centro Estatal del Deporte Mario Vázquez Raña	800	–	–
Guerreros de Tlaxcala	Chiautempan, Tlaxcala	Unidad Deportiva Próspero Cahuantzi	2,500	–	–
Licántropos	Puebla, Puebla	Campos El Cóndor	500	—	—
Lobos Puebla	Puebla, Puebla	Centro Estatal del Deporte Mario Vázquez Raña	800	—	—
Los Ángeles	Puebla, Puebla	Centro Estatal del Deporte Mario Vázquez Raña	800	—	—
Papanes de Papantla	Papantla, Veracruz	Fénix Solidaridad	3,000	—	—
Poza Rica	Poza Rica, Veracruz	Heriberto Jara Corona	10,000	—	—
Reales de Puebla	Chachapa, Puebla	Unidad Deportiva Chachapa	1,000	—	—
Sozca	Lerdo de Tejada, Veracruz	Miguel Seoane Lavín	1,000	—	—
Sultanes de Tamazunchale	Tamazunchale, San Luis Potosí	Deportivo Solidaridad	1,650	–	–
Tantoyuca	Tantoyuca, Veracruz	Campo ADA	1,000	–	–
Tehuacán	Tehuacán, Puebla	Polideportivo La Huizachera	1,000	—	—

=== League table ===
Pos	Team	Pld	W	D	L	GF	GA	GD	Pts	Qualification or relegation
1	Poza Rica	28	22	4	2	69	23	+46	71	Advance to Liguilla de Ascenso
2	Caballeros de Córdoba	28	17	7	4	52	29	+23	61	Advance to Liguilla de Ascenso
3	Licántropos	28	18	4	6	56	25	+31	60	Advance to Liguilla de Ascenso
4	Delfines UGM	28	18	3	7	55	28	+27	58	Advance to Liguilla de Ascenso
5	Tantoyuca	28	12	9	7	44	33	+11	50	Advance to Liguilla de Ascenso
6	Papanes de Papantla	28	11	7	10	46	36	+10	45	
7	Tehuacán	28	12	7	9	38	37	+1	45	
8	Sozca	28	10	5	13	34	41	−7	37	
9	Lobos Puebla	28	10	5	13	40	46	−6	37	
10	Guerreros de Tlaxcala	28	8	6	14	29	50	−21	35	
11	Sultanes de Tamazunchale	28	8	5	15	38	54	−16	31	
12	Reales de Puebla	28	7	5	16	22	50	−28	28	
13	Atlético Hilanderos	28	7	4	17	28	51	−23	28	
14	Los Ángeles	28	4	8	16	22	40	−18	25	
15	Guerreros de Puebla	28	3	7	18	20	50	−30	19	

Updated to match(es) played on 23 April 2022. Source: Liga TDP

== Group 4 ==
Group with 16 teams from Greater Mexico City.

=== Teams ===
Location of teams in the 2021–22 Liga TDP Group 4

Team	City	Home ground	Capacity	Affiliate	Official name
Álamos	Iztacalco, Mexico City	Deportivo Plutarco Elías Calles	300	–	–
Aragón	Venustiano Carranza, Mexico City	Deportivo Plutarco Elías Calles	300	Pachuca	Atlético San Juan de Aragón
Athletic Club Esmeralda	Tultitlán, State of Mexico	ESMAC	1,000	–	Valle de Xico F.C.
Aztecas AMF Soccer	Venustiano Carranza, Mexico City	Deportivo Plutarco Elías Calles	300	–	–
Club Carsaf	Venustiano Carranza, Mexico City	Deportivo Lázaro Cárdenas	1,000	–	–
Cefor Mario Gálvez	Venustiano Carranza, Mexico City	Deportivo Plutarco Elías Calles	300	–	Marina
Chilangos	Benito Juárez, Mexico City	Deportivo Benito Juárez	1,000	–	–
Cuervos Blancos	Cuautitlán, State of Mexico	Los Pinos	5,000	–	–
Cuervos de Silver Soccer	Xochimilco, Mexico City	San Isidro	1,200	–	–
Escorpiones	Ecatepec, State of Mexico	Canchas Titanium	500	Escorpiones	–
Halcones de Rayón	Iztacalco, Mexico City	Magdalena Mixhuca Sports City Ground 1	500	–	–
Muxes	Texcoco, State of Mexico	Unidad Deportiva Silverio Pérez	1,500	–	–
Novillos Neza	Venustiano Carranza, Mexico City	Deportivo Eduardo Molina	500	–	–
Oceanía	Venustiano Carranza, Mexico City	Deportivo Oceanía	1,000	–	–
Politécnico	Venustiano Carranza, Mexico City	Deportivo Leandro Valle	1,000	–	–
R-Reyes	Venustiano Carranza, Mexico City	Deportivo Plutarco Elías Calles	300	–	–

=== League table ===
Pos	Team	Pld	W	D	L	GF	GA	GD	Pts	Qualification or relegation
1	Muxes	30	27	3	0	114	4	+110	86	Advance to Liguilla de Ascenso
2	Cuervos Blancos	30	20	5	5	62	31	+31	69	Advance to Liguilla de Ascenso
3	Cuervos de Silver Soccer	30	18	6	6	64	30	+34	64	Advance to Liguilla de Ascenso
4	Chilangos	30	17	6	7	59	31	+28	60	Advance to Liguilla de Ascenso
5	Aragón	30	16	8	6	70	28	+42	58	Advance to Liguilla de Ascenso
6	Club Carsaf	30	15	8	7	44	23	+21	57	Advance to Liguilla de Ascenso
7	Álamos	30	13	6	11	44	33	+11	50	Advance to Liguilla de Ascenso
8	Politécnico	30	12	7	11	32	41	−9	47	
9	Escorpiones	30	13	3	14	43	45	−2	42	
10	Oceanía	30	9	7	14	30	46	−16	38	
11	Athletic Club Esmeralda	30	10	6	14	36	65	−29	38	
12	Halcones de Rayón	30	8	8	14	43	70	−27	35	
13	R–Reyes	30	3	9	18	26	63	−37	24	
14	Novillos Neza	30	4	7	19	21	70	−49	20	
15	Aztecas AMF Soccer	30	4	6	20	22	72	−50	20	
16	Cefor Mario Gálvez	30	1	5	24	16	74	−58	12	

Updated to match(es) played on 24 April 2022. Source: Liga TDP

== Group 5 ==
Group with 15 teams from Greater Mexico City. NOTE: On October 28, 2021, Mayas Soccer F.C. was expelled from the League for not fulfilling its obligations as an affiliate.

=== Teams ===
Location of teams in the 2021–22 Liga TDP Group 5
Location of teams in the 2021–22 Liga TDP Group 5 (Rural Greater Mexico City)

Team	City	Home ground	Capacity	Affiliate	Official name
Academia América Leyendas	Iztapalapa, Mexico City	Deportivo Leandro Valle	1,000	–	San José del Arenal
Ángeles de la Ciudad	Coyoacán, Mexico City	Deportivo Rosario Iglesias	600	–	–
Cañoneros	Venustiano Carranza, Mexico City	Deportivo Plutarco Elías Calles	300	Cañoneros	Promodep Central
CDM	Venustiano Carranza, Mexico City	Deportivo Plutarco Elías Calles	300	–	–
Dongu	Cuautitlán, State of Mexico	Los Pinos	5,000	Dongu	–
Ecatepec	Ecatepec de Morelos, State of Mexico	Adolfo López Mateos	1,000	–	–
Guerreros DDios	Xochimilco, Mexico City	San Isidro	1,000	–	–
Héroes de Zaci	Venustiano Carranza, Mexico City	Deportivo Lázaro Cárdenas	1,000	–	–
Independiente Mexiquense	Huehuetoca, State of Mexico	12 de Mayo	1,500	–	–
León Izcalli	Cuautitlán Izcalli, State of Mexico	Hugo Sánchez Márquez	3,500	León	–
Loyalty	Huixquilucan de Degollado, State of Mexico	Alberto Pérez Navarro	3,000	–	–
Morelos	Ecatepec de Morelos, State of Mexico	Deportivo Siervo de la Nación	1,000	–	–
Olimpo	Venustiano Carranza, Mexico City	Momoxco	3,500	–	Colegio Once México
Sangre de Campeón	Tultitlán, State of Mexico	Cancha Nou Camp	1,000	–	–
Unión	Melchor Ocampo, State of Mexico	Deportivo Melchor Ocampo	1,000	–	–

=== League table ===
Pos	Team	Pld	W	D	L	GF	GA	GD	Pts	Qualification or relegation
1	CDM	28	20	7	1	75	22	+53	71	Advance to Liguilla de Ascenso
2	Guerreros DDios	28	18	7	3	60	19	+41	64	Advance to Liguilla de Ascenso
3	Loyalty	28	17	3	8	57	30	+27	57	Advance to Liguilla de Ascenso
4	Unión	28	16	5	7	41	24	+17	56	Advance to Liguilla de Ascenso
5	Héroes de Zaci	28	17	3	8	50	34	+16	56	Advance to Liguilla de Ascenso
6	Ángeles de la Ciudad	28	14	7	7	48	24	+24	53	
7	Morelos	28	14	5	9	46	36	+10	50	
8	Sangre de Campeón	27	10	6	11	36	41	−5	40	
9	León Izcalli	28	7	11	10	36	36	0	37	
10	Academia América Leyendas	28	9	6	13	33	48	−15	36	
11	Olimpo	28	4	11	13	27	48	−21	28	
12	Dongu	28	5	7	16	27	54	−27	26	
13	Independiente Mexiquense	28	6	5	17	22	47	−25	25	
14	Ecatepec	29	3	6	20	24	66	−42	17	
15	Cañoneros	28	2	7	19	20	73	−53	14	

Updated to match(es) played on 23 April 2022. Source: Liga TDP

== Group 6 ==
Group with 12 teams from State of Mexico.

Location of teams in the 2021–22 Liga TDP Group 6

=== Teams ===
Team	City	Home ground	Capacity	Affiliate	Official name
Águilas Talpa	Huehuetoca, State of Mexico	12 de Mayo	1,500	–	Deportivo Talpa
Ciervos	Chalco, State of Mexico	Arreola	3,217	Chalco	Club de Ciervos F.C.
El Árbol Santa Fe	Metepec, State of Mexico	Jesús Lara	500	–	–
Estudiantes	Atlacomulco, State of Mexico	Municipal de Atlacomulco	2,000	–	–
Eurosoccer	San Mateo Atenco, State of Mexico	Municipal San Mateo Atenco	2,500	–	Deportivo Metepec
MACA	Metepec, State of Mexico	Jesús Lara	500	–	–
Proyecto México Soccer	Tenango del Valle, State of Mexico	Unidad Deportiva Alfredo del Mazo	1,000	–	Grupo Sherwood
Real San Luis	Metepec, State of Mexico	Colegio Miraflores Toluca	500	Aguacateros CDU	Originales Aguacateros
Sime Soccer	San Antonio la Isla, State of Mexico	Unidad Deportiva San Antonio la Isla	1,000	–	CH Fútbol Club
Tenancingo	Tenancingo, State of Mexico	JM "Grillo" Cruzalta	3,000	–	Fuerza Mazahua
Toluca	Metepec, State of Mexico	Instalaciones de Metepec	1,000	Toluca	–
Villa Flor	Villa Guerrero, State of Mexico	Municipal de Villa Guerrero	1,500	–	C.D. Apaseo El Alto

=== League table ===
Pos	Team	Pld	W	D	L	GF	GA	GD	Pts	Qualification or relegation
1	Toluca	22	15	5	2	47	18	+29	54	Advance to Liguilla de No Ascenso
2	Estudiantes	22	15	5	2	67	20	+47	53	Advance to Liguilla de Ascenso
3	Sime Soccer	22	15	4	3	38	14	+24	51	Advance to Liguilla de Ascenso
4	Proyecto México Soccer	22	12	8	2	38	18	+20	47	Advance to Liguilla de Ascenso
5	El Árbol Santa Fe	22	12	5	5	34	17	+17	43	Advance to Liguilla de No Ascenso
6	Tenancingo	22	9	6	7	31	29	+2	37	
7	MACA	22	8	3	11	28	30	−2	29	
8	Ciervos	22	6	3	13	31	40	−9	22	
9	Villa Flor	22	6	2	14	34	60	−26	22	
10	Real San Luis	22	5	2	15	22	55	−33	18	
11	Águilas Talpa	22	2	5	15	20	45	−25	13	
12	Eurosoccer	22	1	4	17	11	55	−44	7	

Updated to match(es) played on 23 April 2022. Source: Liga TDP

== Group 7 ==
Group with 13 teams from Guerrero, Mexico City Morelos and State of Mexico.

=== Teams ===
Location of teams in the 2021–22 Liga TDP Group 7 (Mexico City, Morelos and State of Mexico)
Location of teams in the 2021–22 Liga TDP Group 7 (Guerrero)

Team	City	Home ground	Capacity	Official name	Affiliate
Académicos Jojutla	Jojutla, Morelos	Unidad Deportiva La Perseverancia	1,000	–	–
Camaleones	Acapulco, Guerrero	Polideportivo CICI Renacimiento	1,000	–	–
Chilpancingo	Chilpancingo, Guerrero	Polideportivo Chilpancingo	5,000	–	–
FORMAFUTINTEGRAL	Ixtapaluca, State of Mexico	Campo La Era	1,000	–	–
Iguala	Iguala, Guerrero	Unidad Deportiva Iguala	4,000	–	–
Iguanas	Zihuatanejo, Guerrero	Unidad Deportiva Zihuatanejo	1,000	–	–
Juárez	Xochimilco, Mexico City	Deportivo Montesur	1,000	–	Juárez
Juniors Vidal Peralta	Tezoyuca, Morelos	Unidad Deportiva Vidal Peralta	1,000	Santiago Tulantepec	–
Leones	Chalco, State of Mexico	San Marcos	1,000	–	–
Selva Cañera	Jojutla, Morelos	Unidad Deportiva La Perseverancia	1,000	–	–
Tigres Yautepec	Yautepec, Morelos	Centro Deportivo Yautepec	3,000	Atlético Cuernavaca	–
Tlapa	Tlapa de Comonfort, Guerrero	Unidad Deportiva Tlapa	1,000	–	–
Yautepec	Yautepec, Morelos	Centro Deportivo Yautepec	3,000	–	–

=== League table ===
Pos	Team	Pld	W	D	L	GF	GA	GD	Pts	Qualification or relegation
1	Chilpancingo	24	19	3	2	79	16	+63	60	Advance to Liguilla de Ascenso
2	Juárez	24	16	6	2	58	15	+43	57	Advance to Liguilla de No Ascenso
3	Tigres Yautepec	24	14	6	4	46	17	+29	53	Advance to Liguilla de Ascenso
4	Yautepec	24	15	4	5	51	17	+34	52	Advance to Liguilla de Ascenso
5	Selva Cañera	24	11	7	6	47	30	+17	42	Advance to Liguilla de Ascenso
6	Leones	24	9	6	9	31	28	+3	37	Advance to Liguilla de No Ascenso
7	Juniors Vidal Peralta	24	10	5	9	28	29	−1	37	
8	Iguala	24	9	4	11	29	37	−8	32	
9	Académicos Jojutla	24	6	6	12	34	51	−17	27	
10	FORMAFUTINTEGRAL	24	7	4	13	27	45	−18	27	
11	Iguanas	24	4	5	15	14	52	−38	20	
12	Tlapa	24	4	3	17	11	71	−60	15	
13	Camaleones	24	1	3	20	10	57	−47	9	

Updated to match(es) played on 23 April 2022. Source: Liga TDP

== Group 8 ==
Group with 16 teams from Hidalgo, Mexico City and State of Mexico.

=== Teams ===
Location of teams in the 2021–22 Liga TDP Group 8 (Hidalgo and Puebla)
Location of teams in the 2021–22 Liga TDP Group 8 (State of Mexico)

Team	City	Home ground	Capacity	Affiliate	Official name
Atlético Huejutla	Huejutla , Hidalgo	Capitán Antonio Reyes Cabrera "El Tordo"	1,000	–	–
Atlético Pachuca	Pachuca, Hidalgo	Revolución Mexicana	3,500	–	–
Atlético Toltecas	Tula, Hidalgo	Unidad Deportiva la Tortuga	1,000	–	–
Bombarderos de Tecámac	Tecámac, State of Mexico	Galaxias del Llano	500	–	–
CEFOR "Chaco" Giménez	Tulancingo, Hidalgo	Primero de Mayo	2,500	–	–
Ceforfema	Singuilucan, Hidalgo	Unidad Deportiva Singuilucan	1,000	–	Atlético Boca del Río
Faraones de Texcoco	Texcoco, State of Mexico	Claudio Suárez	4,000	–	–
Guerreros Aztecas IAFE	San Martín de las Pirámides, State of Mexico	Deportivo Braulio Romero	1,000	Alebrijes de Oaxaca	–
Guerreros de la Plata	Pachuca, Hidalgo	Horacio Baños	1,000	–	–
Halcones Negros	Chicoloapan de Juárez, State of Mexico	Unidad Deportiva San José	1,000	–	–
Halcones Zúñiga	Texcoco, State of Mexico	Unidad Deportiva Silverio Pérez	1,000	–	–
Hidalguense	Pachuca, Hidalgo	Club Hidalguense	600	–	–
MARNAP	Ixmiquilpan, Hidalgo	Deportivo Marnap	1,000	–	–
Matamoros	Papalotla, State of Mexico	IMCFD Papalotla	1,000	–	–
Sk Sport Street Soccer	Tulancingo, Hidalgo	Unidad Deportiva Javier Rojo Gómez	2,000	–	–
Tuzos Pachuca	San Agustín Tlaxiaca, Hidalgo	Universidad del Fútbol	1,000	Pachuca	–

=== League table ===
Pos	Team	Pld	W	D	L	GF	GA	GD	Pts	Qualification or relegation
1	Faraones de Texcoco	30	25	2	3	104	23	+81	77	Advance to Liguilla de Ascenso
2	Bombarderos de Tecámac	30	21	6	3	72	27	+45	71	Advance to Liguilla de Ascenso
3	Tuzos Pachuca	30	19	9	2	84	25	+59	70	Advance to Liguilla de Ascenso
4	Sk Sport Street Soccer	30	20	2	8	71	30	+41	63	Advance to Liguilla de Ascenso
5	Atlético Pachuca	30	16	7	7	62	28	+34	59	Advance to Liguilla de Ascenso
6	Hidalguense	30	15	7	8	63	33	+30	57	
7	Matamoros	30	15	4	11	64	41	+23	50	
8	Halcones Negros	30	13	6	11	55	36	+19	50	
9	Atlético Toltecas	30	9	7	14	43	54	−11	38	
10	Guerreros de La Plata	30	10	5	15	41	59	−18	36	
11	CEFOR "Chaco" Giménez	30	8	6	16	43	58	−15	33	
12	Atlético Huejutla	30	9	3	18	35	77	−42	32	
13	MARNAP	30	6	8	16	44	62	−18	28	
14	Ceforfema	30	4	6	20	22	119	−97	23	
15	Halcones Zúñiga	30	4	5	21	30	81	−51	20	
16	Guerreros Aztecas IAFE	30	2	5	23	16	96	−80	11	

Updated to match(es) played on 23 April 2022. Source: Liga TDP

== Group 9 ==
Group with 15 teams from Guanajuato and Querétaro.

Location of teams in the 2021–22 Liga TDP Group 9 (Guanajuato)
Location of teams in the 2021–22 Liga TDP Group 9 (Querétaro)

=== Teams ===
Team	City	Home ground	Capacity	Affiliate	Official name
Atlético Cadereyta	Cadereyta de Montes, Querétaro	Unidad Deportiva Cadereyta	1,100	–	Atlético Queréndaro
Celaya	Celaya, Guanajuato	Miguel Alemán Valdés	23,182	Celaya	–
Celaya Linces	Celaya, Guanajuato	Unidad Deportiva Norte	1,000	–	–
Correcaminos Tequisquiapan	Tequisquiapan, Querétaro	Unidad Deportiva Emiliano Zapata	1,000	Correcaminos UAT	–
Estudiantes de Querétaro	Querétaro, Querétaro	Casa de la Juventud INDEREQ	1,000	–	–
Inter Aicesa SJR	Querétaro, Querétaro	Unidad Deportiva La Cañada	2,000	Inter de Querétaro	Querétaro 3D
Inter Fundadores	El Marqués, Querétaro	Parque Bicentenario	1,000	Inter de Querétaro	–
Inter de Querétaro	Querétaro, Querétaro	Unidad Deportiva La Cañada	2,000	Inter de Querétaro	–
Lobos ITECA	San Luis de la Paz, Guanajuato	El Internado	1,500	–	–
Mineros Querétaro	Colón, Querétaro	Universidad CEICKOR	500	Mineros de Zacatecas	–
Oro La Piedad Querétaro	Querétaro, Querétaro	El Infiernillo	1,000	–	–
Petroleros Querétaro	Querétaro, Querétaro	Casa de la Juventud INDEREQ	1,000	–	–
Real Marqués	El Marqués, Querétaro	Unidad Deportiva La Cañada	2,000	–	Cañada CTM
Strikers	San Miguel de Allende, Guanajuato	José María 'Capi' Correa	4,000	–	–
Titanes de Querétaro	Querétaro, Querétaro	IMSS Querétaro	1,000	–	–

=== League table ===
Pos	Team	Pld	W	D	L	GF	GA	GD	Pts	Qualification or relegation
1	Titanes de Querétaro	28	23	5	0	93	17	+76	76	Advance to Liguilla de Ascenso
2	Petroleros Querétaro	28	22	2	4	61	23	+38	69	Advance to Liguilla de Ascenso
3	Estudiantes de Querétaro	28	21	1	6	69	23	+46	64	Advance to Liguilla de Ascenso
4	Inter Aicesa SJR	28	18	2	8	63	30	+33	57	
5	Lobos ITECA	28	16	6	6	62	50	+12	56	
6	Correcaminos Tequisquiapan	28	14	4	10	58	35	+23	47	Advance to Liguilla de No Ascenso
7	Real Marqués	28	10	9	9	44	41	+3	45	
8	Celaya Linces	28	11	5	12	45	50	−5	40	
9	Celaya	28	7	9	12	30	44	−14	36	
10	Mineros Querétaro	28	9	4	15	43	70	−27	34	
11	Oro La Piedad Querétaro	28	8	5	15	29	51	−22	32	
12	Strikers	28	8	4	16	30	55	−25	28	
13	Inter de Querétaro	28	2	8	18	21	54	−33	17	
14	Atlético Cadereyta	28	3	5	20	19	63	−44	17	
15	Inter Fundadores	28	2	3	23	16	77	−61	11	

Updated to match(es) played on 23 April 2022. Source: Liga TDP

== Group 10 ==
Group with 10 teams from Guanajuato and Michoacán. NOTE: Deportivo Yurécuaro was announced as a member of the group, however on September 29, 2021, the club withdrew from the league voluntarily.

=== Teams ===
Location of teams in the 2021–22 Liga TDP Group 10 (Michoacán)
Location of teams in the 2021–22 Liga TDP Group 10 (Guanajuato)

Team	City	Home ground	Capacity	Affiliate	Official name
Aguacateros de Peribán	Peribán, Michoacán	Paricutín	2,000	–	–
Atlético Chavinda	Chavinda, Michoacán	Club Campestre Chavinda	500	–	–
Cantereros Morelia	Morelia, Michoacán	Complejo Deportivo Bicentenario	1,000	–	Atlético Valladolid
Delfines de Abasolo	Abasolo, Guanajuato	Municipal de Abasolo	2,500	–	–
Furia Azul	Pátzcuaro, Michoacán	Furia Azul	3,000	–	–
H2O Purépechas	Morelia, Michoacán	Venustiano Carranza	17,600	Atlético Morelia	–
Huetamo	Huetamo, Michoacán	Unidad Deportiva Simón Bolívar	1,000	La Piedad	Degollado
Michoacán F.C.	Pátzcuaro, Michoacán	Furia Azul	3,000	–	–
Ocoteros de Cuerámaro	Cuerámaro, Guanajuato	Municipal Juan José Torres Landa	1,000	–	Jaral del Progreso
Soberano Zamora	Zamora, Michoacán	Unidad Deportiva El Chamizal	5,000	–	–

=== League table ===
Pos	Team	Pld	W	D	L	GF	GA	GD	Pts	Qualification or relegation
1	Aguacateros de Peribán	18	14	3	1	56	13	+43	48	Advance to Liguilla de Ascenso
2	Michoacán F.C.	18	11	4	3	38	16	+22	39	Advance to Liguilla de Ascenso
3	H2O Purépechas	18	11	4	3	39	11	+28	38	Advance to Liguilla de Ascenso
4	Furia Azul	18	9	6	3	34	22	+12	37	Advance to Liguilla de Ascenso
5	Soberano Zamora	18	6	6	6	34	24	+10	27	
6	Delfines de Abasolo	18	6	5	7	22	25	−3	25	
7	Huetamo	18	5	4	9	25	34	−9	21	
8	Atlético Chavinda	18	4	2	12	15	36	−21	15	
9	Ocoteros de Cuerámaro	18	3	4	11	19	55	−36	13	
10	Cantereros Morelia	18	1	2	15	12	58	−46	7	

Updated to match(es) played on 23 April 2022. Source: Liga TDP

== Group 11 ==
Group with 10 teams from Aguascalientes, Durango, Guanajuato, Jalisco and Zacatecas. NOTE: Atlético ECCA was announced as a team member of the group, however on September 29, 2021, it was expelled from the League for not fulfilling its obligations as an affiliate.

=== Teams ===
Location of teams in the 2021–22 Liga TDP Group 11 (Guanajuato and Jalisco)
Location of teams in the 2021–22 Liga TDP Group 11 (Aguascalientes, Durango and Zacatecas)

Team	City	Home ground	Capacity	Affiliate	Official name
Alacranes de Durango	Durango, Durango	Cancha Anexa Francisco Zarco	500	Alacranes de Durango	–
Atlético Leonés	León, Guanajuato	Unidad Deportiva Enrique Fernández Martínez	2,000	–	–
Cachorros de León	León, Guanajuato	CODE Las Joyas	1,000	–	Fut-Car
Empresarios del Rincón	Purísima del Rincón, Guanajuato	Unidad Deportiva de Purísima	1,000	–	Real Olmeca Sport
Jerez	Jerez, Zacatecas	Unidad Deportiva Solidaridad	1,000	–	FC Zacatecas
Mineros de Zacatecas	Zacatecas, Zacatecas	Universitario Deportiva Guadalupe	1,000	Mineros de Zacatecas	–
Pabellón	Pabellón de Arteaga, Aguascalientes	Luis Guzmán	2,000	–	–
León GEN	Lagos de Moreno, Jalisco	Complejo Deportivo GEN	2,000	León	–
Tuzos UAZ	Zacatecas, Zacatecas	Universitario Unidad Deportiva Norte	5,000	Tuzos UAZ	–
Zapateros de León	León, Guanajuato	Luis "Chino" Estrada	500	–	–

=== League table ===
Pos	Team	Pld	W	D	L	GF	GA	GD	Pts	Qualification or relegation
1	Atlético Leonés	18	12	3	3	45	16	+29	42	Advance to Liguilla de Ascenso
2	Tuzos UAZ	18	12	4	2	61	21	+40	41	Advance to Liguilla de Ascenso
3	Mineros de Zacatecas	18	10	2	6	43	29	+14	34	Advance to Liguilla de No Ascenso
4	Cachorros de León	18	9	4	5	35	21	+14	31	Advance to Liguilla de Ascenso
5	Jerez	18	5	8	5	26	24	+2	29	
6	Pabellón	18	7	4	7	21	18	+3	28	
7	Zapateros de León	18	7	3	8	27	30	−3	24	
8	Alacranes de Durango	18	5	2	11	30	36	−6	18	
9	Empresarios del Rincón	18	3	2	13	12	41	−29	12	
10	León GEN	18	3	2	13	17	81	−64	11	

Updated to match(es) played on 23 April 2022. Source: Liga TDP

== Group 12 ==
Group with 12 teams from Jalisco.

=== Teams ===
Location of teams in the 2021–22 Liga TDP Group 12

Team	City	Home ground	Capacity	Affiliate	Official name
Acatlán	Zapotlanejo, Jalisco	Miguel Hidalgo	1,500	–	–
Agaveros	Tlajomulco de Zúñiga, Jalisco	Campos Elite	1,000	–	–
Alteños Acatic	Acatic, Jalisco	Unidad Deportiva Acatic	1,000	Tepatitlán	–
Aves Blancas	Tepatitlán de Morelos, Jalisco	Corredor Industrial	1,200	–	–
Ayense	Ayotlán, Jalisco	Chino Rivas	4,000	–	–
Gorilas de Juanacatlán	Juanacatlán, Jalisco	Club Juanacatlán	500	–	–
Nacional	Zapopan, Jalisco	Club Deportivo Imperio	500	–	–
Oro	Tonalá, Jalisco	Unidad Deportiva Revolución Mexicana	3,000	–	–
Salamanca	Yahualica, Jalisco	Las Ánimas	8,500	–	–
Tapatíos Soccer	Zapopan, Jalisco	Club Deportivo Aviña	1,000	–	–
Tepatitlán	Tepatitlán de Morelos, Jalisco	Gregorio "Tepa" Gómez	8,085	Tepatitlán	–
Tornados Tlaquepaque	Tlaquepaque, Jalisco	Complejo Deportivo Maracaná	500	–	Atlético Cocula

=== League table ===
Pos	Team	Pld	W	D	L	GF	GA	GD	Pts	Qualification or relegation
1	Ayense	22	15	6	1	49	16	+33	54	Advance to Liguilla de Ascenso
2	Gorilas de Juanacatlán	22	13	8	1	38	13	+25	51	Advance to Liguilla de Ascenso
3	Tapatíos Soccer	22	13	4	5	50	22	+28	47	Advance to Liguilla de Ascenso
4	Tepatitlán	22	11	5	6	40	24	+16	40	Advance to Liguilla de Ascenso
5	Aves Blancas	22	7	8	7	31	27	+4	34	
6	Agaveros	22	10	3	9	38	31	+7	33	
7	Acatlán	22	7	6	9	29	31	−2	30	
8	Oro	22	6	6	10	22	29	−7	28	
9	Salamanca	22	7	5	10	31	40	−9	28	
10	Tornados de Tlaquepaque	22	5	6	11	15	37	−22	25	
11	Alteños Acatic	22	6	2	14	30	50	−20	20	
12	Nacional	22	0	5	17	11	64	−53	6	

Updated to match(es) played on 23 April 2022. Source: Liga TDP

== Group 13 ==
Group with 11 teams from Jalisco.

=== Teams ===
Location of teams in the 2021–22 Liga TDP Group 13

Team	City	Home ground	Capacity	Affiliate	Official name
Caja Oblatos	Tlaquepaque, Jalisco	Club Vaqueros	1,000	–	–
Catedráticos Elite	Etzatlán, Jalisco	Unidad Deportiva Etzatlán	1,000	Catedráticos Elite	–
Deportivo Cihuatlán	Cihuatlán, Jalisco	El Llanito	5,000	–	–
Deportivo Cimagol	Tlaquepaque, Jalisco	Club Deportivo del Valle	1,000	–	–
SD Eibar Escuela México	Jocotepec, Jalisco	Municipal de Jocotepec	2,500	Eibar	–
Gallos Viejos	Zapopan, Jalisco	Club Pumas Tesistán	1,000	–	–
Leones Negros UdeG	Zapopan, Jalisco	Club Deportivo U. de G.	3,000	Leones Negros UdeG	–
Mazorqueros	Ciudad Guzmán, Jalisco	Municipal Santa Rosa	3,500	Mazorqueros	–
Real Ánimas de Sayula	Sayula, Jalisco	Gustavo Díaz Ordaz	4,000	–	–
River Plate Escuela Jalisco	Tonalá, Jalisco	Unidad Deportiva Revolución Mexicana	3,000	River Plate	–
Tecos	Zapopan, Jalisco	Tres de Marzo	18,779	Tecos	–

=== League table ===
Pos	Team	Pld	W	D	L	GF	GA	GD	Pts	Qualification or relegation
1	Mazorqueros	20	14	4	2	51	13	+38	50	Advance to Liguilla de Ascenso
2	Real Ánimas de Sayula	20	13	4	3	47	21	+26	46	Advance to Liguilla de Ascenso
3	Catedráticos Elite	20	12	5	3	38	22	+16	43	Advance to Liguilla de Ascenso
4	Leones Negros UdeG	20	11	3	6	42	17	+25	38	Advance to Liguilla de No Ascenso
5	Tecos	20	10	3	7	35	24	+11	34	Advance to Liguilla de No Ascenso
6	Caja Oblatos	20	6	6	8	34	35	−1	24	
7	River Plate Escuela Jalisco	20	6	5	9	33	34	−1	27	Advance to Liguilla de No Ascenso
8	Gallos Viejos	20	7	5	8	32	36	−4	26	
9	Deportivo Cihuatlán	20	5	3	12	18	39	−21	21	
10	SD Eibar Escuela México	20	4	5	11	17	42	−25	19	
11	Deportivo Cimagol	20	0	1	19	7	71	−64	2	

Updated to match(es) played on 23 April 2022. Source: Liga TDP

== Group 14 ==
Group with 12 teams from Jalisco, Nayarit and Sinaloa. NOTE: Camaroneros de Escuinapa participated in the first half of the season, but withdrew from the league in February 2022 for unknown reasons.

=== Teams ===
Location of teams in the 2021–22 Liga TDP Group 14 (Jalisco and Nayarit)
Location of teams in the 2021–22 Liga TDP Group 14 (Sinaloa)

Team	City	Home ground	Capacity	Affiliate	Official name
Atlético Nayarit	Xalisco, Nayarit	Olímpico Santa Teresita	4,000	–	–
Camaroneros de Escuinapa	Tonalá, Jalisco	Unidad Deportiva Revolución Mexicana	3,000	–	–
CEFO–ALR	Ameca, Jalisco	Núcleo Deportivo y de Espectáculos Ameca	7,000	Tecos	–
Coras	Tepic, Nayarit	Olímpico Santa Teresita	4,000	Coras	–
Deportivo Tala	Tala, Jalisco	Centro Deportivo y Cultural 24 de Marzo	3,000	–	Volcanes de Colima
Diablos Tesistán	Zapopan, Jalisco	Club Diablos Tesistán	1,000	–	–
Dorados de Sinaloa	Navolato, Sinaloa	Juventud	2,000	Dorados de Sinaloa	–
Fénix CFAR	San Isidro Mazatepec, Jalisco	La Fortaleza	1,000	–	–
Legado del Centenario	Ixtlahuacán de los Membrillos, Jalisco	Unidad Deportiva Ixtlahuacán de los Membrillos	1,000	–	–
Puerto Vallarta	Puerto Vallarta, Jalisco	Ejidal La Preciosa	2,000	–	–
Tigres de Alica	Xalisco, Nayarit	Unidad Deportiva AFEN "Dos Toños"	2,000	–	–
Xalisco	Xalisco, Nayarit	Unidad Deportiva AFEN "Dos Toños"	2,000	–	–

=== League table ===
Pos	Team	Pld	W	D	L	GF	GA	GD	Pts	Qualification or relegation
1	Diablos Tesistán	20	13	6	1	45	17	+28	48	Advance to Liguilla de Ascenso
2	Dorados de Sinaloa	20	14	2	4	43	15	+28	45	Advance to Liguilla de No Ascenso
3	Deportivo Tala	20	11	5	4	47	29	+18	41	Advance to Liguilla de Ascenso
4	Legado del Centenario	20	11	4	5	46	19	+27	39	Advance to Liguilla de Ascenso
5	Coras	20	10	4	6	40	30	+10	37	Advance to Liguilla de No Ascenso
6	Tigres de Alica	20	10	3	7	28	26	+2	36	
7	Xalisco	20	8	2	10	28	35	−7	28	
8	Fénix CFAR	20	5	4	11	26	50	−24	19	
9	Puerto Vallarta	20	4	3	13	20	44	−24	17	
10	CEFO–ALR	20	2	4	14	13	40	−27	11	
11	Atlético Nayarit	20	1	5	14	11	42	−31	9	

Updated to match(es) played on 23 April 2022. Source: Liga TDP

== Group 15 ==
Group with 16 teams from Coahuila, Nuevo León, San Luis Potosí and Tamaulipas. NOTE: Bravos de Nuevo Laredo participated in the first half of the season, but withdrew from the league in January 2022 due to financial problems.

=== Teams ===
Location of teams in the 2021–22 Liga TDP Group 15 (Nuevo León)
Location of teams in the 2021–22 Liga TDP Group 15 (Coahuila)
Location of teams in the 2021–22 Liga TDP Group 15 (San Luis and Tamaulipas)

Team	City	Home ground	Capacity	Affiliate	Official name
Bravos de Nuevo Laredo	Nuevo Laredo, Tamaulipas	Unidad Deportiva Benito Juárez	5,000	–	–
Cadereyta	Cadereyta, Nuevo León	Clemente Salinas Netro	1,000	–	–
Correcaminos UAT	Ciudad Victoria, Tamaulipas	Profesor Eugenio Alvizo Porras	5,000	Correcaminos UAT	–
FCD Bulls Santiago	Santiago, Nuevo León	FCD El Barrial	570	FC Dallas	–
Gallos Nuevo León	San Nicolás de los Garza, Nuevo León	Parque Deportivo Mario J. Montemayor	1,000	–	–
Garzas Blancas	Axtla de Terrazas, San Luis Potosí	Garzas Blancas	1,000	–	–
Gavilanes de Matamoros	Matamoros, Tamaulipas	El Hogar	22,000	Gavilanes de Matamoros	Ho Gar H. Matamoros
Guerreros Reynosa	Reynosa, Tamaulipas	José María Leal Gutiérrez	3,000	–	–
Halcones de Saltillo	Saltillo, Coahuila	Olímpico Francisco I. Madero	7,000	–	San Isidro Laguna
Irritilas	San Pedro, Coahuila	Quinta Ximena	1,000	–	–
Mineros Reynosa	Reynosa, Tamaulipas	Unidad Deportiva Solidaridad	20,000	Mineros de Zacatecas	Deportivo Soria
Orgullo Surtam	Tampico, Tamaulipas	Unidad Deportiva Tampico	1,500	–	–
Real San Cosme	Monterrey, Nuevo León	Ciudad Deportiva Churubusco	1,000	–	–
Regios	Monterrey, Nuevo León	Ciudad Deportiva Churubusco	1,000	–	–
Saltillo Soccer	Saltillo, Coahuila	Olímpico Francisco I. Madero	7,000	Saltillo	–
San Nicolás	San Nicolás de los Garza, Nuevo León	Unidad Deportiva Oriente	1,000	–	–

=== League table ===
Pos	Team	Pld	W	D	L	GF	GA	GD	Pts	Qualification or relegation
1	Saltillo Soccer	28	25	3	0	71	14	+57	79	Advance to Liguilla de Ascenso
2	FCD Bulls Santiago	28	17	6	5	51	20	+31	62	Advance to Liguilla de Ascenso
3	Orgullo Surtam	28	19	4	5	60	26	+34	63	Advance to Liguilla de Ascenso
4	Cadereyta	28	19	2	7	69	28	+41	61	Advance to Liguilla de Ascenso
5	Correcaminos UAT	28	13	6	9	38	40	−2	51	Advance to Liguilla de No Ascenso
6	Mineros Reynosa	28	14	5	9	53	40	+13	50	
7	Irritilas	28	15	3	10	59	28	+31	49	
8	Garzas Blancas	28	9	5	14	38	51	−13	33	
9	Guerreros Reynosa	28	8	5	15	23	43	−20	32	
10	Gavilanes de Matamoros	28	6	9	13	42	55	−13	31	
11	Regios	28	6	8	14	26	50	−24	31	
12	Halcones de Saltillo	28	6	6	16	24	65	−41	27	
13	Gallos Nuevo León	28	7	4	17	42	63	−21	25	
14	San Nicolás	28	6	4	18	26	54	−28	23	
15	Real San Cosme	28	2	6	20	27	72	−45	14	

Updated to match(es) played on 23 April 2022. Source: Liga TDP

== Group 16 ==
Group with 11 teams from Baja California, Chihuahua and Sonora.

=== Teams ===
Location of teams in the 2021–22 Liga TDP Group 16

Team	City	Home ground	Capacity	Affiliate	Official name
Atlético Nogales	Nogales, Sonora	Jesús Jegar García	2,000	–	Huatabampo
Búhos UNISON	Hermosillo, Sonora	Miguel Castro Servín	4,000	–	–
Cachanillas	Mexicali, Baja California	Eduardo "Boticas" Pérez	2,000	–	–
CEPROFFA	Ciudad Juárez, Chihuahua	CEPROFFA	1,000	–	–
Cimarrones de Sonora	Hermosillo, Sonora	Héroe de Nacozari	18,747	Cimarrones de Sonora	–
Cobras Fut Premier	Ciudad Juárez, Chihuahua	20 de Noviembre	2,500	–	–
Etchojoa	Etchojoa, Sonora	Trigueros	1,500	–	–
Guaymas	Guaymas, Sonora	Unidad Deportiva Julio Alfonso	3,000	–	–
La Tribu de Ciudad Juárez	Ciudad Juárez, Chihuahua	Complejo La Tribu	500	–	–
Real Magari	Chihuahua, Chihuahua	Olímpico Ciudad Deportiva	4,000	–	–
Xolos Hermosillo	Hermosillo, Sonora	Cancha Aarón Gamal Aguirre Fimbres	1,000	Tijuana	–

=== League table ===
Pos	Team	Pld	W	D	L	GF	GA	GD	Pts	Qualification or relegation
1	La Tribu de Ciudad Juárez	20	11	9	0	59	22	+37	46	Advance to Liguilla de Ascenso
2	Cimarrones de Sonora	20	12	6	2	38	12	+26	45	Advance to Liguilla de No Ascenso
3	CEPROFFA	20	11	4	5	34	22	+12	40	Advance to Liguilla de Ascenso
4	Cachanillas	20	9	5	6	30	29	+1	37	
5	Etchojoa	20	10	5	5	36	29	+7	36	
6	Xolos Hermosillo	20	7	5	8	28	27	+1	28	Advance to Liguilla de No Ascenso
7	Búhos UNISON	20	6	6	8	23	30	−7	26	
8	Real Magari	20	6	3	11	18	29	−11	23	
9	Cobras Fut Premier	20	6	4	10	15	35	−20	23	
10	Guaymas	20	3	4	13	15	34	−19	15	
11	Atlético Nogales	20	3	1	16	10	37	−27	11	

Updated to match(es) played on 23 April 2022. Source: Liga TDP

== Group 17 ==
Group with 4 teams from Baja California.

=== Teams ===
Location of teams in the 2021–22 Liga TDP Group 17

Team	City	Home ground	Capacity	Affiliate
40 Grados MXL	Mexicali, Baja California	Unidad Deportiva Baja California	1,000	–
Gladiadores Tijuana	Tijuana, Baja California	CREA Tijuana	10,000	–
London	Rosarito Beach, Baja California	Campo Emiliano Zapata	500	–
Rosarito	Rosarito Beach, Baja California	Andrés Luna	2,000	–

=== League table ===
Pos	Team	Pld	W	D	L	GF	GA	GD	Pts	Qualification or relegation
1	London	24	16	3	5	52	24	+28	53	Advance to Liguilla de Ascenso
2	Gladiadores Tijuana	24	14	5	5	48	25	+23	49	
3	40 Grados MXL	24	8	5	11	34	45	−11	32	
4	Rosarito	24	1	5	18	22	62	−40	9	

Updated to match(es) played on 23 April 2022. Source: Liga TDP

== Promotion Play–offs ==
The Promotion Play–offs will consist of seven phases. Classify 64 teams, the number varies according to the number of teams in each group, being between three and eight clubs per group. The country will be divided into two zones: South Zone (Groups 1 to 8) and North Zone (Groups 9 to 17). Eliminations will be held according to the average obtained by each team, being ordered from best to worst by their percentage throughout the season.

As of 2020–21 season, the names of the knockout stages were modified as follows: Round of 32, Round of 16, Quarter-finals, Semifinals, Zone Final and Final, this as a consequence of the division of the country into two zones, for so the teams only face clubs from the same region until the final series.

=== Round of 32 ===
The first legs were played on 27 and 28 April, and the second legs were played on 30 April and 1 May 2022.

==== South Zone ====
Team 1	Agg.	Team 2	1st leg	2nd leg
Muxes	6–2	Pioneros Junior	0–1	6–1
Deportiva Venados	5–2	Álamos	2–2	3–0
CDM	2–2 (1–3) (p.)	Corsarios de Campeche	1–1	1–1
Poza Rica	4–1	UNICACH	2–1	2–0
Chilpancingo	4–1	Selva Cañera	1–1	3–0
Estudiantes	5–0	Tantoyuca	2–0	3–0
Sime Soccer	1–0	Universidad del Sureste	1–0	0–0
Cuervos Blancos	3–0	CARSAF	2–0	1–0
Guerreros DDios	1–0	Aragón	1–0	0–0
Tigres Yautepec	2–4	Inter Playa del Carmen	1–1	1–3
Lechuzas UPGCH	(p.) 2–2 (4–1)	Héroes de Zaci	2–0	0–2
Caballeros de Córdoba	3–1	Unión	0–0	3–1
Yautepec	4–4 (2–4) (p.)	Chilangos	1–4	3–0
Licántropos	6–2	Loyalty	2–2	4–0
Proyecto México Soccer	1–1 (1–3) (p.)	Cruz Azul Lagunas	0–0	1–1
Cuervos de Silver Soccer	0–3	Delfines UGM	0–2	0–1

==== North Zone ====
Team 1	Agg.	Team 2	1st leg	2nd leg
Saltillo Soccer	2–2 (4–5) (p.)	Cachorros de León	0–2	2–0
Titanes de Querétaro	2–1	Tepatitlán	0–0	2–1
Aguacateros de Peribán	6–2	Legado del Centenario	2–2	4–0
Faraones de Texcoco	2–1	Atlético Pachuca	1–1	1–0
Mazorqueros	4–2	CEPROFFA	2–1	2–1
Petroleros Querétaro	(p.) 3–3 (5–3)	Deportivo Tala	2–1	1–2
Ayense	4–3	Furia Azul	1–2	3–1
Diablos Tesistán	2–3	Sk Sport Street Soccer	1–1	1–2
Bombarderos de Tecámac	4–1	H2O Purépechas	1–0	3–1
Tuzos Pachuca	4–2	Tapatíos Soccer	1–0	3–2
Atlético Leonés	2–1	Catedráticos Elite	0–1	2–0
Gorilas de Juanacatlán	4–3	Michoacán F.C.	3–1	1–2
La Tribu de Ciudad Juárez	2–0	Cadereyta	0–0	2–0
Real Ánimas de Sayula	3–1	London	1–1	2–0
Estudiantes de Querétaro	1–6	FCD Bulls de Santiago	1–4	0–2
Tuzos UAZ	11–3	Orgullo Surtam	3–3	8–0

=== Round of 16 ===
The first legs were played on 4 and 5 May, and the second legs will be played on 7 and 8 May 2022.

==== South Zone ====
Team 1	Agg.	Team 2	1st leg	2nd leg
Muxes	6–1	Corsarios de Campeche	1–1	5–0
Deportiva Venados	3–1	Inter Playa del Carmen	1–0	2–1
Poza Rica	7–2	Chilangos	3–2	4–0
Chilpancingo	4–2	Cruz Azul Lagunas	1–1	3–1
Estudiantes	1–2	Delfines UGM	0–2	1–0
Sime Soccer	3–2	Licántropos	2–2	1–0
Cuervos Blancos	1–2	Caballeros de Córdoba	0–0	1–2
Guerreros DDios	3–2	Lechuzas UPGCH	1–1	2–1

==== North Zone ====
Team 1	Agg.	Team 2	1st leg	2nd leg
Titanes de Querétaro	7–0	Cachorros de León	4–0	3–0
Aguacateros de Peribán	2–4	Sk Sport Street Soccer	0–1	2–3
Faraones de Texcoco	3–4	FCD Bulls de Santiago	2–2	1–2
Mazorqueros	6–3	Tuzos UAZ	2–2	4–1
Petroleros Querétaro	4–6	Real Ánimas de Sayula	0–3	4–3
Ayense	2–2 (1–3) (p.)	La Tribu de Ciudad Juárez	1–2	1–0
Bombarderos de Tecámac	1–3	Gorilas de Juanacatlán	0–2	1–1
Tuzos Pachuca	3–4	Atlético Leonés	1–1	2–3

=== Final stage ===
Zone Quarter–finals
1	Deportiva Venados	1	2	3
16	Caballeros de Córdoba	1	0	1
8	Muxes	1	0	1 (3)
9	Delfines UGM (p.)	1	0	1 (5)
5	Chilpancingo	1	4	5
12	Sime Soccer	1	1	2
4	Poza Rica	1	2	3 (2)
13	Guerreros DDios (p.)	3	0	3 (3)
6	Mazorqueros (p.)	1	0	1 (5)
11	FCD Bulls de Santiago	1	0	1 (4)
3	Gorilas de Juanacatlán	1	2	3
14	La Tribu de Ciudad Juárez	1	0	1
7	Titanes de Querétaro (p.)	1	1	2 (6)
10	Sk Sport Street Soccer	0	2	2 (5)
2	Atlético Leonés	1	0	1 (8)
15	Real Ánimas de Sayula (p.)	1	0	1 (9)

Zone Semi–finals
Deportiva Venados	1	3	4
Delfines UGM	1	0	1
Chilpancingo	1	2	3
Guerreros DDios	0	0	0
Mazorqueros	1	2	3
Gorilas de Juanacatlán	0	2	2
Titanes de Querétaro	0	3	3 (9)
Real Ánimas de Sayula (p.)	2	1	3 (10)

Zone finals
Deportiva Venados	1	2	3
Chilpancingo	1	1	2
Mazorqueros	3	2	5
Real Ánimas de Sayula	2	2	4

National final
Deportiva Venados	0
Mazorqueros	1

==== Zone Quarter–finals ====
The first legs were played on 11 and 12 May, and the second legs were played on 14 and 15 May 2022.

Team 1	Agg.	Team 2	1st leg	2nd leg
Muxes	1–1 (3–5) (p.)	Delfines UGM	1–1	0–0
Deportiva Venados	3–1	Caballeros de Córdoba	1–1	2–0
Poza Rica	3–3 (2–3) (p.)	Guerreros DDios	1–3	2–0
Chilpancingo	5–2	Sime Soccer	1–1	4–1
Titanes de Querétaro	(p.) 2–2 (6–5)	Sk Sport Street Soccer	1–0	1–2
Mazorqueros	(p.) 1–1 (5–4)	FCD Bulls de Santiago	1–1	0–0
Atlético Leonés	1–1 (8–9) (p.)	Real Ánimas de Sayula	1–1	0–0
Gorilas de Juanacatlán	3–1	La Tribu de Ciudad Juárez	1–1	2–0

===== First leg =====
11 May 2022	FCD Bulls de Santiago	1–1	Mazorqueros	Santiago, Nuevo León
11:00 CDT (UTC−5)	Ruiz 62'	Report	Arana 55'	Stadium: Club FCD El Barrial; Attendance: 150; Referee: Gerardo Yahir Mendoza Sánchez

11 May 2022	Sk Sport Street Soccer	0–1	Titanes de Querétaro	Tulancingo, Hidalgo
12:00 CDT (UTC−5)		Report	Ramírez 90'	Stadium: Estadio Primero de Mayo; Attendance: 200; Referee: Mauricio Roque Trejo

11 May 2022	Guerreros DDios	3–1	Poza Rica	Mexico City
13:00 CDT (UTC−5)	Camacho 22'; Domínguez 72'; Escobar 74' (own)	Report	Cruz 4'	Stadium: Deportivo Plutarco Elías Calles; Attendance: 200; Referee: Kevin Peñaloza Flores

11 May 2022	Delfines UGM	1–1	Muxes	Nogales, Veracruz
15:00 CDT (UTC−5)	Barojas 59'	Report	Cibrián 44'	Stadium: Estadio Universitario UGM; Attendance: 350; Referee: Luis Guadalupe Rodríguez Ocaña

11 May 2022	Sime Soccer	1–1	Chilpancingo	San Antonio la Isla, State of Mexico
15:00 CDT (UTC−5)	Juárez 30'	Report	Dávila 49'	Stadium: Unidad Deportiva San Antonio la Isla; Attendance: 200; Referee: Héctor Morales Leal

11 May 2022	Caballeros de Córdoba	1–1	Deportiva Venados	Córdoba, Veracruz
16:00 CDT (UTC−5)	Oliva 90'	Report	Maya 55'	Stadium: Estadio Rafael Murillo Vidal; Attendance: 500; Referee: Adrián Jhonatan del Ángel Olán

11 May 2022	Real Ánimas de Sayula	1–1	Atlético Leonés	Sayula, Jalisco
17:00 CDT (UTC−5)	Orozco 90'	Report	Muñoz 11'	Stadium: Estadio Gustavo Díaz Ordaz; Attendance: 500; Referee: Jairo Jovani Sosa Martínez

12 May 2022	La Tribu de Ciudad Juárez	1–1	Gorilas de Juanacatlán	Ciudad Juárez, Chihuahua
14:00 MDT (UTC−6)	Silva 78'	Report	Ríos 8'	Stadium: Complejo La Tribu; Attendance: 200; Referee: Rodrigo Ramos Romo

===== Second leg =====
14 May 2022	Chilpancingo	4–1 (5–2 agg.)	Sime Soccer	Chilpancingo, Guerrero
12:00 CDT (UTC−5)	Francisco 7'; Nava 31'; Dávila 51'; Sevilla 77'	Report		Stadium: Polideportivo Chilpancingo; Attendance: 3,100; Referee: Carlos Jesús Gaytán Durán

14 May 2022	Deportiva Venados	2–0 (3–1 agg.)	Caballeros de Córdoba	Tamanché, Yucatán
15:00 CDT (UTC−5)	Ramírez 38'; Maya 63'	Report		Stadium: Estadio Alonso Diego Molina; Attendance: 200; Referee: Fernando Alexander Cruz Garatachea

14 May 2022	Titanes de Querétaro	1–2 (2–2 agg.) (6–5 p)	Sk Sport Street Soccer	San José Iturbide, Guanajuato
16:00 CDT (UTC−5)	Serrano 65'	Report	Landa 43'; Botello 45'	Stadium: Unidad Deportiva San José Iturbide; Attendance: 200; Referee: Rafael Heras Villa

14 May 2022	Muxes	0–0 (1–1 agg.) (3–5 p)	Delfines UGM	Texcoco, State of Mexico
16:00 CDT (UTC−5)		Report		Stadium: Unidad Deportiva Silverio Pérez; Attendance: 400; Referee: Heisel Gerardo Santana Arguelles

14 May 2022	Atlético Leonés	0–0 (1–1 agg.) (8–9 p)	Real Ánimas de Sayula	León, Guanajuato
16:00 CDT (UTC−5)		Report		Stadium: Unidad Deportiva Enrique Fernández Martínez; Attendance: 400; Referee: Daniel Sinue García Sánchez

14 May 2022	Poza Rica	2–0 (3–3 agg.) (2–3 p)	Guerreros DDios	Poza Rica, Veracruz
17:00 CDT (UTC−5)	Moreno 6'; Mendoza 17'	Report		Stadium: Estadio Heriberto Jara Corona; Attendance: 2,100; Referee: Maximiliano Arias Guzmán

14 May 2022	Mazorqueros	0–0 (1–1 agg.) (5–4 p)	FCD Bulls de Santiago	Ciudad Guzmán, Jalisco
19:00 CDT (UTC−5)		Report		Stadium: Estadio Municipal Santa Rosa; Attendance: 600; Referee: María Fernanda Márquez López

15 May 2022	Gorilas de Juanacatlán	2–0 (3–1 agg.)	La Tribu de Ciudad Juárez	Juanacatlán, Jalisco
19:30 CDT (UTC−5)	Medina 53', 90'	Report		Stadium: Club Juanacatlán; Attendance: 800; Referee: Edwin Eduardo Morfín Verduzco

==== Zone Semi–finals ====
The first legs were played on 18 May, and the second legs were played on 21 May 2022.

Team 1	Agg.	Team 2	1st leg	2nd leg
Deportiva Venados	4–1	Delfines UGM	1–1	3–0
Chilpancingo	3–0	Guerreros DDios	1–0	2–0
Titanes de Querétaro	3–3 (9–10) (p.)	Real Ánimas de Sayula	0–2	3–1
Mazorqueros	3–2	Gorilas de Juanacatlán	1–0	2–2

===== First leg =====
18 May 2022	Guerreros DDios	0–1	Chilpancingo	Mexico City
13:00 CDT (UTC−5)		Report	Dávila 70'	Stadium: Deportivo Plutarco Elías Calles; Attendance: 300; Referee: Daniel Sinue García Sánchez

18 May 2022	Delfines UGM	1–1	Deportiva Venados	Nogales, Veracruz
15:00 CDT (UTC−5)	Barojas 60'	Report	Ramírez 17'	Stadium: Estadio Universitario UGM; Attendance: 250; Referee: José Maximiliano Negrete Preciado

18 May 2022	Real Ánimas de Sayula	2–0	Titanes de Querétaro	Sayula, Jalisco
17:00 CDT (UTC−5)	Segura 3', 86'	Report		Stadium: Estadio Gustavo Díaz Ordaz; Attendance: 1,000; Referee: Gerardo Yahir Mendoza Sánchez

18 May 2022	Gorilas de Juanacatlán	0–1	Mazorqueros	Juanacatlán, Jalisco
19:30 CDT (UTC−5)		Report	Sandoval 66'	Stadium: Club Juanacatlán; Attendance: 600; Referee: Alan Vladimir Robles Bernal

===== Second leg =====
21 May 2022	Chilpancingo	2–0 (3–0 agg.)	Guerreros DDios	Chilpancingo, Guerrero
12:00 CDT (UTC−5)	Mata 29'; Dávila 83'	Report		Stadium: Polideportivo Chilpancingo; Attendance: 5,000; Referee: Carlos Jesús Gaytán Durán

21 May 2022	Deportiva Venados	3–0 (4–1 agg.)	Delfines UGM	Tamanché, Yucatán
15:00 CDT (UTC−5)	Escobar 11'; Maya 65'; Torres 83'	Report		Stadium: Estadio Alonso Diego Molina; Attendance: 400; Referee: Mauricio Rodríguez Martínez

21 May 2022	Titanes de Querétaro	3–1 (3–3 agg.) (9–10 p)	Real Ánimas de Sayula	San José Iturbide, Guanajuato
16:00 CDT (UTC−5)	Corona 16'; Castañón 21'; Serrano 22'	Report	Lira 66'	Stadium: Unidad Deportiva San José Iturbide; Attendance: 300; Referee: Fernando Alexander Cruz Garatachea

21 May 2022	Mazorqueros	2–2 (3–2 agg.)	Gorilas de Juanacatlán	Ciudad Guzmán, Jalisco
19:00 CDT (UTC−5)	Pacheco 1'; Sandoval 49'	Report	Ríos 3'; Osorio 69'	Stadium: Estadio Municipal Santa Rosa; Attendance: 4,000; Referee: Rafael Heras Villa

==== Zone Finals ====
The first legs will be played on 25 and 26 May, and the second legs will be played on 28 and 29 May 2022.

Team 1	Agg.	Team 2	1st leg	2nd leg
Deportiva Venados	3–2	Chilpancingo	1–1	2–1
Mazorqueros	5–4	Real Ánimas de Sayula	3–2	2–2

===== First leg =====
25 May 2022	Chilpancingo	1–1	Deportiva Venados	Chilpancingo, Guerrero
15:00 CDT (UTC−5)	Sevilla 76'	Report	Escobar 30'	Stadium: Polideportivo Chilpancingo; Attendance: 5,000; Referee: Miguel Ángel Morales Sánchez

26 May 2022	Real Ánimas de Sayula	2–3	Mazorqueros	Sayula, Jalisco
17:00 CDT (UTC−5)	Muñiz 34'; Estrada 69'	Report	Arana 19'	Stadium: Estadio Gustavo Díaz Ordaz; Attendance: 3,500; Referee: Rafael Heras Villa

===== Second leg =====
28 May 2022	Deportiva Venados	2–1 (3–2 agg.)	Chilpancingo	Tamanché, Yucatán
15:00 CDT (UTC−5)	Torres 2'; Garma 41'	Report	Bautista 72'	Stadium: Estadio Alonso Diego Molina; Attendance: 1,200; Referee: Fernando Alexander Cruz Garatachea

29 May 2022	Mazorqueros	2–2 (5–4 agg.)	Real Ánimas de Sayula	Ciudad Guzmán, Jalisco
17:00 CDT (UTC−5)	Pacheco 38'; Ortíz 77'	Report	Vázquez 12', 62'	Stadium: Estadio Municipal Santa Rosa; Attendance: 4,000; Referee: José Maximiliano Negrete Preciado

==== National runner–ups play–off ====
The two losing clubs in the zone finals played a game to win a place in the Liga Premier – Serie B. The match was played on 1 June 2022.

Team 1	Score	Team 2
Chilpancingo (p.)	3–3 (8–7)	Real Ánimas de Sayula

1 June 2022	Chilpancingo	3–3 (8–7 p)	Real Ánimas de Sayula	Chilpancingo, Guerrero
15:00 CDT (UTC−5)	Dávila 8'; Oliveros 20'; Basilio 53'	Report	Vázquez 37'; Orozco 50'; Valencia 87'	Stadium: Polideportivo Chilpancingo; Attendance: 5,000; Referee: Gerardo Yahir Mendoza Sánchez

==== National Final ====
The two winning clubs from the zone finals played a match to determine the league champion. The match was played on 3 June 2022 at the Estadio Ciudad de los Deportes, Mexico City.

Team 1	Score	Team 2
Deportiva Venados	0–1	Mazorqueros

3 June 2022	Deportiva Venados	0–1	Mazorqueros	Mexico City
11:00 CDT (UTC−5)		Report	Pacheco 61'	Stadium: Estadio Ciudad de los Deportes; Attendance: 400; Referee: Ximena Márquez Ruíz

2021–22 winners

1st title

== Reserve and Development Teams ==
Each season a table is created among those teams that don't have the right to promote, because they are considered as reserve teams for teams that play in Liga MX, Liga de Expansión and Liga Premier or are independent teams that have requested not to participate for the Promotion due to the fact that they are footballers development projects. The ranking order is determined through the "quotient", which is obtained by dividing the points obtained between the disputed matches, being ordered from highest to lowest.

=== Table ===
P	Team	Pts	G	Pts/G	GD
1	Toluca	54	22	2.45	+29
2	Juárez	57	24	2.38	+43
3	Dorados de Sinaloa	45	20	2.25	+28
4	Cimarrones de Sonora	45	20	2.25	+27
5	Alebrijes de Oaxaca	43	20	2.15	+22
6	Cantera Venados	42	20	2.10	+14
7	El Árbol Santa Fe	43	22	1.95	+17
8	Leones Negros UdeG	38	20	1.90	+25
9	Mineros de Zacatecas	34	18	1.89	+14
10	Coras F.C.	37	20	1.85	+10
11	Correcaminos UAT	51	28	1.82	–2
12	Tecos	34	20	1.70	+12
13	Correcaminos Tequisquiapan	47	28	1.68	+23
14	Leones	37	24	1.54	+3
15	Xolos Hermosillo	28	20	1.40	+1
16	River Plate Escuela Jalisco	27	20	1.35	–1
17	León Izcalli	37	28	1.32	0
18	MACA	29	22	1.32	–2
19	Búhos UNISON	26	20	1.30	–7
20	Celaya	36	28	1.29	–14
21	Salamanca	28	22	1.27	–9
22	Atlético Toltecas	38	30	1.27	–11
23	Guerreros Tlaxcala	35	28	1.25	–21
24	Mineros Querétaro	34	28	1.21	–27
25	La Piedad Querétaro	32	28	1.14	–22
26	Regios	31	28	1.11	–24
27	Alacranes de Durango	18	18	1.00	–6
28	Ciervos	22	22	1.00	–9
29	SD Eibar Escuela México	19	20	0.95	–25
30	Dongu	26	28	0.93	–27
31	Alteños Acatic	20	22	0.91	–20
32	Gallos Nuevo León	25	28	0.89	–21
33	Atlético Chavinda	15	18	0.83	–21
34	Inter de Querétaro	17	28	0.61	–33
35	Atlético Cadereyta	17	28	0.61	–44
36	León GEN	11	18	0.61	–64
37	Águilas Talpa	13	22	0.59	–25
38	CEFO-ALR	11	20	0.55	–27
39	Atlético Nogales	11	20	0.55	–27
40	Atlético Nayarit	9	20	0.45	–31
41	Camaleones	9	24	0.38	–47
42	Guerreros Aztecas IAFE	11	30	0.37	–80
43	Yucatán	6	20	0.30	–39

Last updated: April 23, 2022
Source: Liga TDP
P = Position; G = Games played; Pts = Points; Pts/G = Ratio of points to games played; GD = Goal difference

=== Play–offs ===
Round of 16
4	Cimarrones de Sonora (w/o)	0	1	1
13	Correcaminos Tequisquiapan	0	0	0
6	Cantera Venados	2	2	4
11	Correcaminos UAT	1	1	2
2	Juárez	2	2	4
15	Xolos Hermosillo	3	0	3
7	El Árbol Santa Fe	0	3	3
10	Coras	2	2	4
3	Dorados de Sinaloa	0	3	3
14	Leones	1	0	1
8	Leones Negros UdeG	2	1	3
9	Mineros de Zacatecas	0	1	1
1	Toluca	1	1	2
16	River Plate Jalisco	0	1	1
5	Alebrijes de Oaxaca	0	1	1 (3)
12	Tecos (p.)	0	1	1 (4)

Quarter–finals
4	Cimarrones de Sonora	2	6	8
6	Cantera Venados	0	0	0
2	Juárez	2	3	5 (1)
10	Coras (p.)	1	4	5 (3)
3	Dorados de Sinaloa	1	3	4
8	Leones Negros UdeG	0	0	0
1	Toluca	2	1	3
12	Tecos	2	3	5

Semi–finals
4	Cimarrones de Sonora	0	1	1
10	Coras	0	0	0
3	Dorados de Sinaloa	0	1	1
12	Tecos	1	2	3

Final
4	Cimarrones de Sonora	0	0	0
12	Tecos	1	3	4

==== Round of 16 ====
The first legs were played on 27 and 28 April, and the second legs were played on 30 April and 1 May 2022.

Team 1	Agg.	Team 2	1st leg	2nd leg
Toluca	2–1	River Plate Escuela Jalisco	1–0	1–1
Leones Negros UdeG	3–1	Mineros de Zacatecas	2–0	1–1
Cimarrones de Sonora (w/o)	1–0	Correcaminos Tequisquiapan	0–0	1–0
Alebrijes de Oaxaca	1–1 (3–4) (p.)	Tecos	0–0	1–1
Juárez	4–3	Xolos Hermosillo	2–3	2–0
El Árbol Santa Fe	3–4	Coras	0–2	3–2
Dorados de Sinaloa	3–0	Leones	0–1	3–1
Cantera Venados	4–2	Correcaminos UAT	2–1	2–1

===== First leg =====
27 April 2022	River Plate Escuela Jalisco	0–1	Toluca	Tonalá, Jalisco
10:00 CDT (UTC−5)		Report	Dorantes 58'	Stadium: Unidad Deportiva Revolución Mexicana; Attendance: 100; Referee: Rafael Heras Villa

27 April 2022	Correcaminos UAT	1–2	Cantera Venados	Ciudad Victoria, Tamaulipas
10:00 CDT (UTC−5)	Pozada 43'	Report	Márquez 1', 39'	Stadium: Estadio Profesor Eugenio Alvizo Porras; Attendance: 100; Referee: Juan Daniel Peña Garza

27 April 2022	Mineros de Zacatecas	0–2	Leones Negros UdeG	Guadalupe, Zacatecas
11:00 CDT (UTC−5)		Report	Álvarez 20'; Jaime 26'	Stadium: Unidad Deportiva Guadalupe; Attendance: 250; Referee: Rubén Omar Ortiz Flores

27 April 2022	Coras	2–0	El Árbol Santa Fe	Xalisco, Nayarit
15:00 MDT (UTC−6)	Duarte 28'; Sánchez 51'	Report		Stadium: Unidad Deportiva AFEN "Dos Toños"; Attendance: 100; Referee: Francisco Eduardo del Real Torres

27 April 2022	Leones	1–0	Dorados de Sinaloa	Chalco, State of Mexico
16:00 CDT (UTC−5)	Carmona 61'	Report		Stadium: Estadio San Marcos; Attendance: 150; Referee: Nohemí Martínez Rivera

27 April 2022	Xolos Hermosillo	3–2	Juárez	Hermosillo, Sonora
17:30 MST (UTC−7)	Anderson 29'; Arzac 35', 54'	Report	13' Tobie; 64' Bernal	Stadium: Cancha Sauceda Aarón Gamal; Attendance: 50; Referee: Adán Rubio Castro

28 April 2022	Tecos	0–0	Alebrijes de Oaxaca	Zapopan, Jalisco
10:00 CDT (UTC−5)		Report		Stadium: Cancha Anexa Tres de Marzo; Attendance: 50; Referee: Alan Vladimir Robles Bernal

===== Second leg =====
30 April 2022	Dorados de Sinaloa	3–0 (3–1 agg.)	Leones	Culiacán, Sinaloa
10:00 MDT (UTC−6)	Tirado 12'; Félix 80'; Zazueta 90'	Report		Stadium: Estadio Dorados; Attendance: 150; Referee: Erick González Miranda

30 April 2022	Leones Negros UdeG	1–1 (3–1 agg.)	Mineros de Zacatecas	Zapopan, Jalisco
11:00 CDT (UTC−5)	Monteón 30'	Report	Flores 47'	Stadium: Club Deportivo La Primavera U. de G. Attendance: 100; Referee: Axel Jesús Ibares González

30 April 2022	Juárez	2–0 (4–3 agg.)	Xolos Hermosillo	Mexico City
11:00 CDT (UTC−5)	Hernández 72'; Morales 73'	Report		Stadium: Club Campestre Monte Sur; Attendance: 150; Referee: Jesús Morales Rodríguez

30 April 2022	Toluca	1–1 (2–1 agg.)	River Plate Escuela Jalisco	Metepec, State of Mexico
15:00 CDT (UTC−5)	Arteaga 52'	Report	Padilla 27'	Stadium: Instalaciones de Metepec; Attendance: 50; Referee: Aarón Vega Cabrera

30 April 2022	El Árbol Santa Fe	3–2 (3–4 agg.)	Coras	Metepec, State of Mexico
16:00 CDT (UTC−5)	López 33'; Escobedo 49'; García 85'	Report	Andrade 14'; Duarte 65'	Stadium: Estadio Jesús Lara; Attendance: 300; Referee: Mauricio Roque Trejo

30 April 2022	Cantera Venados	2–1 (4–2 agg.)	Correcaminos UAT	Mérida, Yucatán
16:30 CDT (UTC−5)	Hernández 6' (own); Domínguez 47' (own)	Report	Flores 18'	Stadium: Estadio Carlos Iturralde; Attendance: 200; Referee: José Nicolás López Vázquez

1 May 2022	Alebrijes de Oaxaca	1–1 (1–1 agg.) (3–4 p)	Tecos	Oaxaca City, Oaxaca
12:30 CDT (UTC−5)	Nevarez 45'	Report	Jacobo 2'	Stadium: Estadio Tecnológico de Oaxaca; Attendance: 100; Referee: Benito Vasco Pérez

==== Quarter-finals ====
The first legs were played on 4 and 5 May, and the second legs were played on 7 and 8 May 2022.

Team 1	Agg.	Team 2	1st leg	2nd leg
Toluca	3–5	Tecos	2–2	1–3
Cimarrones de Sonora	8–0	Cantera Venados	2–0	6–0
Juárez	5–5 (1–3) (p.)	Coras	2–1	3–4
Dorados de Sinaloa	4–0	Leones Negros UdeG	1–0	3–0

===== First leg =====
4 May 2022	Tecos	2–2	Toluca	Zapopan, Jalisco
10:00 CDT (UTC−5)	López 22'; Lugo 90'	Report	García 44', 64'	Stadium: Cancha Anexa Tres de Marzo; Attendance: 50; Referee: Erika Montserrat González Nevares

4 May 2022	Leones Negros UdeG	0–1	Dorados de Sinaloa	Zapopan, Jalisco
11:00 CDT (UTC−5)		Report	Arellano 76'	Stadium: Club Deportivo La Primavera U. de G. Attendance: 100; Referee: Ximena Márquez Ruíz

4 May 2022	Coras	1–2	Juárez	Xalisco, Nayarit
15:00 MDT (UTC−6)	Duarte 24'	Report	Bernal 40'; De la Mora 68'	Stadium: Unidad Deportiva AFEN "Dos Toños"; Attendance: 50; Referee: Carlos Zohet Martínez Vega

5 May 2022	Cantera Venados	0–2	Cimarrones de Sonora	Mérida, Yucatán
16:30 CDT (UTC−5)		Report	Enríquez 30'; Navarro 48'	Stadium: Estadio Carlos Iturralde; Attendance: 150; Referee: Fermín Izquierdo Paz

===== Second leg =====
7 May 2022	Dorados de Sinaloa	3–0 (4–0 agg.)	Leones Negros UdeG	Culiacán, Sinaloa
10:00 MDT (UTC−6)	Tirado 36'; Rodríguez 75'; Ruiz 84'	Report		Stadium: Estadio Dorados; Attendance: 350; Referee: Figo Rodolfo López Valle

7 May 2022	Juárez	3–4 (5–5 agg.) (1–3 p)	Coras	Mexico City
11:00 CDT (UTC−5)	Hernández 11'; Flores 31'; Morales 61'	Report	Gutiérrez 14', 22'; Anguiano 24'; Miranda 90'	Stadium: Club Campestre Monte Sur; Attendance: 100; Referee: Daniel Sinue García Sánchez

7 May 2022	Toluca	1–3 (3–5 agg.)	Tecos	Metepec, State of Mexico
15:00 CDT (UTC−5)	López 35'	Report	Cabral 1', 90'; Hernández 70'	Stadium: Instalaciones de Metepec; Attendance: 200; Referee: Benjamín Hernández Rodríguez

8 May 2022	Cimarrones de Sonora	6–0 (8–0 agg.)	Cantera Venados	Hermosillo, Sonora
10:00 MST (UTC−7)	Navarro 17'; Cortéz 37'; Fernández 50'; Hernández 65'; Meléndez 79', 83'	Report		Stadium: Estadio Héroe de Nacozari; Attendance: 100; Referee: Carlos Omar Cruz Busani

==== Semi-finals ====
The first legs were played on 11 and 12 May, and the second legs were played on 14 and 15 May 2022.

Team 1	Agg.	Team 2	1st leg	2nd leg
Dorados de Sinaloa	1–3	Tecos	0–1	1–2
Cimarrones de Sonora	1–0	Coras	0–0	1–0

===== First leg =====
11 May 2022	Tecos	1–0	Dorados de Sinaloa	Zapopan, Jalisco
10:00 CDT (UTC−5)	Cabral 2'	Report		Stadium: Cancha Anexa Tres de Marzo; Attendance: 120; Referee: Ximena Márquez Ruíz

12 May 2022	Coras	0–0	Cimarrones de Sonora	Xalisco, Nayarit
15:30 MDT (UTC−6)		Report		Stadium: Unidad Deportiva AFEN "Dos Toños"; Attendance: 520; Referee: Erika Monserrat González Nevarez

===== Second leg =====
14 May 2022	Dorados de Sinaloa	1–2 (1–3 agg.)	Tecos	Culiacán, Sinaloa
10:00 MDT (UTC−6)	Zazueta 45'	Report	Jacobo 80'; Lugo 85'	Stadium: Estadio Dorados; Attendance: 600; Referee: Carlos Zohet Martínez Vega

15 May 2022	Cimarrones de Sonora	1–0 (1–0 agg.)	Coras	Hermosillo, Sonora
19:30 MST (UTC−7)	Solórzano 59'	Report		Stadium: Estadio Héroe de Nacozari; Attendance: 348; Referee: Oscar Manuel Elens Orejel

==== Final ====
The first leg were played on 19 May, and the second leg were played on 22 May 2022.

Team 1	Agg.	Team 2	1st leg	2nd leg
Cimarrones de Sonora	0–4	Tecos	0–1	0–3

===== First leg =====
19 May 2022	Tecos	1–0	Cimarrones de Sonora	Zapopan, Jalisco
10:00 CDT (UTC−5)	Hernández 32'	Report		Stadium: Cancha Anexa Tres de Marzo; Attendance: 600; Referee: Ximena Márquez Ruíz

===== Second leg =====
22 May 2022	Cimarrones de Sonora	0–3 (0–4 agg.)	Tecos	Hermosillo, Sonora
19:00 MST (UTC−7)		Report	Reyes 56', 90'; Cabral 77'	Stadium: Estadio Héroe de Nacozari; Attendance: 2,448; Referee: Rodrigo Ramos Romo

2021–22 No promotion winners

4th title

== Regular season statistics ==
=== Top goalscorers ===
Players sorted first by goals scored, then by last name.

Rank	Player	Club	Goals
1	(Mexico) Ángel Alejandro Crespo	Saltillo Soccer	32
2	(Mexico) Juan José González	Tuzos Pachuca	30
3	(Mexico) Anhdony Salinas	Irritilas	29
4	(Mexico) Diego Márquez	Aragón	26
4	(Mexico) William Terrones	Halcones Negros	26
6	(Mexico) Jesús Eduardo Dávila	Chilpancingo	25
7	(Mexico) Víctor Hugo García	Titanes de Querétaro	23
7	(Mexico) Usiel Robles	Hidalguense	23
9	(Mexico) Edson Cibrián	Muxes	22
9	(Mexico) Abisaí Cruz	Tantoyuca	22

Source:Liga TDP
