= Arturo Robles Aguilar =

Mexican politician

Municipal President of Pabellón de Arteaga
- In office 1 January 1999 – 31 December 2001
- Preceded by: Faustino Quezada Chavez
- Succeeded by: Felipe de Jesús Ortega Sauceda

Deputy of the Congress of the Union for the 1st district of Aguascalientes
- In office 1 September 2003 – 31 August 2006
- Preceded by: José Roque Rodríguez López
- Succeeded by: Pedro Armendáriz García

Personal details
- Born: 15 December 1956 (age 69) Pabellón de Arteaga, Aguascalientes, Mexico
- Party: PRI
- Parent(s): José Robles de Lira; Sanjuana Aguilar Reina
- Occupation: Politician

Arturo Robles Aguilar (born 15 December 1956) is a Mexican politician affiliated with the Institutional Revolutionary Party. And served for Municipal President of Pabellón de Arteaga to 1999–2001, As of 2014 he served as Deputy of the LIX Legislature of the Mexican Congress representing Aguascalientes. He is a Phytotechnician Agricultural Engineer from the Universidad Autónoma Chapingo, State of Mexico (1975-1980), with a specialty in Horticulture at the University of Pisa, Italy (1985-1986), a diploma in Public Administration at ITESM (2000) and a diploma in Public Administration at ITAM (2000-2001) and a diploma in public policy at CIDE (2015).
