= Rebeca Uribe =

Mexican poet

Rebeca Mondragón Uribe
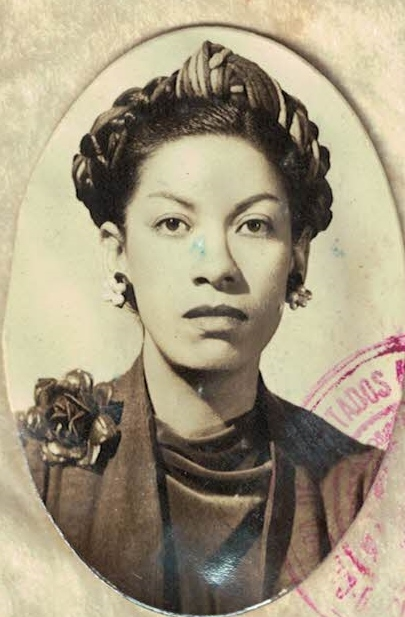
- Born: May 18, 1912; Sayula, Jalisco, Mexico
- Died: August 14, 1949 (aged 37); Mexico City
- Resting place: Panteón Español
- Education: University of Guadalajara
- Occupations: poet, actor
- Writing career
- Language: Spanish

Rebeca Mondragón Uribe (1912–1949) was a Mexican poet of the postmodernist movement. She gave recitations of her poems at the Teatro Degollado de Guadalajara (1913–1942). She also worked as the social secretary of actress María Félix from 1945 to 1949.

Uribe was involved as an experimental theater actress with the PROA group between 1942 and 1945, and she later performed in the Conference Hall of the Palace of Fine Arts. Uribe published six books of poetry, of which five survive. She died in Mexico City on August 14, 1949. Her work, due to its aesthetics can be considered Los Contemporáneos. The poet Efraín Huerta dedicated a heartfelt poem to Uribe, "Ilamada Elegia de verdadera muerte" in their work La rosa blanca.

== Biography ==
Rebeca Uribe was born in Sayula, Jalisco, on May 8, 1912, to Eloísa Mondragón Valencia and Raúl Uribe. She studied at the Faulty of Economics at the University of Guadalajara, graduating in May 1928. She later worked as a teacher in night schools for the State of Jalisco from 1929 to 1931.

Uribe began her literary life when her first poem was published in the biweekly magazine Carteles in 1928. In 1933 she collaborated with the newspaper El Informador, Nueva Galicia, Las Noticias, publications all based in Guadalajara, as well as Plus Ultra, published in the city of Ciudad Guzmá. She worked as a journalist at Alma Femenina from 1932 and 1933. She published her first book, Esfinge, in 1933, of which no copy remains.

By 1933–1934 her work was found in Arte, in Voz Nueva in 1934, in Cuspide from 1934 and 1935 and in Via in 1936.

In 1937 she moved with her mother to Mexico City, only returning to Guadalajara for short periods of time. In 1942 she returned to participate with other artists in celebrations of the four hundredth anniversary of the establishment of the city of Guadalajara. Once in Mexico City, Uribe published collections of her poetry, which were well received. During this time, she also worked as a stenographer for el Archivo de la Cámara de Diputados del Congreso de la Unión.

She also wrote theatre and film criticism for Cinema Reporter Revista de Revistas, and the Mexico City-based publication Cinema Reporter in 1949.

As an actress and reciter, Uribe debuted her poems at recitals at the Teatro Delgollardo de Guadalajara between 1932 and 1942, as well as events organized by the National Revolutionary Party of Jalisco. She also was an experimental theater actress between 1942 and 1945, where she performed in works by Luis G. Basurto. She worked as the social secretary of actress María Félix from 1945 to 1949.

Uribe died August 14, 1949, in circumstances that are described in some sources as "tragic" and others "murky". She is buried in Panteón Español in Mexico City. There is a street in Guadalajara named in her honour.

Due to her aesthetics, Rebeca Uribe is considered a postmodernist poet. Her artistic preoccupation with themes of death and travel in her poetry, as well as its explicit sensuality, also align with postmodernism.

== Works ==
- Uribe, Rebeca (1949). Poesía. México, D.F.
- Uribe, Rebeca (1945). Poema en 5 tiempos. México.
- Uribe, Rebeca (1943). Poema a modo de una suite. México.
- Uribe, Rebeca (1942). Versos. México: Talleres Gráf. de la Nación.
- Uribe, Rebeca (1940). Llovizna: poemas. México.
- Uribe, Rebeca (1933). Esfunge, Guadalajara (lost work)

== Resources ==
- Silva Lomelí, Leonor Alejandra (2014). El erotismo en la obra de Rebeca Uribe (1934-1941).
- Quezada, Silvia (2013). Toda yo hecha poesía: Rebeca Uribe : un estudio biográfico. Guadalajara: Seminario de Cultura Mexicana. ISBN 978-607-8019-90-8.
- Roark, Carolyn Dianne (2002). "Socializing the audience: Culture, nation -building, and pedagogy in Chile's "teatro infantil"" (Document). United States -- Texas: The University of Texas at Austin. ProQuest 305471510.
