= Pedro Armendáriz García =

Mexican politician

Deputy of the Congress of the Union for the 1st district of Aguascalientes
- In office 1 September 2006 – 31 August 2009
- Preceded by: Arturo Robles Aguilar
- Succeeded by: Antonio Arámbula López

Personal details
- Born: 19 August 1967 (age 58) Aguascalientes, Mexico
- Party: PAN
- Occupation: Politician

Pedro Armendáriz García (born 19 August 1967) is a Mexican politician latterly affiliated with the National Action Party (PAN). He was previously an active member of the Institutional Revolutionary Party (PRI).

In 2006–2009 he served as a federal deputy in the 60th Congress, representing the first district of Aguascalientes. From 2005 to 2006 he was also the Municipal President of San José de Gracia, Aguascalientes.

Preceded by Fidel Martínez Reyes	Municipal President of San José de Gracia; 2005–2006	Succeeded by Armando Rodríguez Domínguez
