= List of municipal presidents of Pabellón de Arteaga =

Municipal President of Pabellón de Arteaga
- Mayor of Pabellón de Arteaga
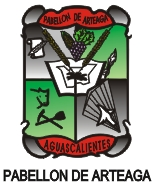
- Seal of the municipality of Pabellón de Arteaga.
- Incumbent; Lucero Espinoza Vázquez since November 1, 2024
- Term length: Three years, renewable once.
- Website: H. Ayuntamiento de Pabellón de Arteaga

The Municipal President of Pabellón de Arteaga (or Mayor of Pabellón de Arteaga in the colloquial sense), is the head of the City Council of Pabellón de Arteaga, the title was created on May 1, 1965, when the Congress of Aguascalientes elevated it to municipality rank, separating it from the Rincón de Romos, the first holder of municipal president was Manuel Ambriz Pacheco as interim president in 1965.

== List of titulars ==
List of all municipal presidents since 1965

Municipal president	Term	Political party	Notes
Manuel Ambriz Pacheco	January 5, 1965 – May 5, 1965	PRI	Acting municipal president
Ángel González Aguilar	June 5, 1966 – December 31, 1968	PRI	
José Ortega Flores	January 1, 1969 – December 31, 1971	PRI	1st period
Víctor Olivares Santana	January 1, 1972 – December 31, 1974	PRI	
Marcelino Ortega Flores	1974	PRI	Acting municipal president
José Guadalupe Delgado de Lira	1975 – December 31, 1977	PRI	
José Ortega Flores	January 1, 1978 – December 31, 1980	PRI	2nd period
Humberto Ambriz Aguilar	January 1, 1981 – December 31, 1983	PRI	
José de Jesús Ramos Franco	January 1, 1984 – December 31, 1986	PRI	
Sergio Ortega Rosales	January 1, 1987 – December 31, 1989	PRI	
Alfredo Robles Aguilar	January 1, 1990 – December 31, 1992	PRI	
José Medina Esparza	January 1, 1993 – December 31, 1995	PRI	
Faustino Quezada Chavez	January 1, 1996 – December 31, 1998	PRI	
Arturo Robles Aguilar	January 1, 1999 – December 31, 2001	PRI	
Felipe de Jesús Ortega Sauceda	January 1, 2002 – December 31, 2004	PRI	
Eduardo Constantino Torre Campos	January 1, 2005 – December 31, 2007	PAN	
Arturo Fernández Estrada	January 1, 2008 – December 31, 2010	PANAL	
Hector Raúl García Luna	January 1, 2011 – December 31, 2013	PANAL	
Sergio Moreno Serna	January 1, 2014 – December 31, 2016	PANAL	
Cuauhtémoc Escobedo Tejada	January 1, 2017 – April 14, 2021	PRD	
Efraín Guevara Araiza	April 14, 2021 – July 1, 2021	PRD	Acting municipal president (1st period)
Cuauhtémoc Escobedo Tejada	April 14, 2021 – November 14, 2021	PRD	
Efraín Guevara Araiza	November 15, 2021 – December 31, 2021	PRD	Acting municipal president (2nd period)
Humberto Ambriz Delgadillo	April 14, 2021 – December 31, 2024	PRI	
Lucero Espinoza Vázquez	November 1, 2024 – December 31, 2027	PRI/PAN/PRD	
