= Adrian García Arias =

Mexican footballer (born 1975)

Adrián García Arias
Personal information
- Full name: Adrián Israel García Arias
- Date of birth: 6 December 1975 (age 50)
- Place of birth: Mexico City, Mexico
- Height: 1.84 m (6 ft 1/2 in)
- Position: Defender

Senior career*
Years	Team	Apps	(Gls)
1997–2002	Toluca	170	(1)
2002–2003	América	14	(0)
2003	Santos Laguna	7	(0)
2003–2005	Chiapas	50	(1)
2005–2009	San Luis	95	(1)
2009–2010	Indios	10	(0)
2010–2011	Morelia	26	(0)
2011–2014	Querétaro	39	(0)
2013–2014	→ Celaya (loan)	4	(0)

International career
2002	Mexico	3	(0)

Managerial career
- 2015: Deportivo Corregidora (Assistant)
- 2017: Generales de Navojoa
- 2017–2018: UNACH
- 2019: Cocodrilos de Tabasco
- 2021: Michoacán F.C.
- 2021–2022: Achuapa (Assistant)
- 2022: Achuapa (Interim)
- 2022: Achuapa
- 2022-2023: Malacateco
- 2023: Achuapa
- 2024: Cobán Imperial
- 2024: Zacapa
- 2025: Achuapa
- 2025: Atlético Mictlán
- * Club domestic league appearances and goals as of 2 November 2013

Adrián Israel García Arías (born 6 December 1975) is a Mexican former footballer and manager who last played as a defender for Celaya of Mexico, and managed Michoacán F.C., a team that plays in Liga TDP. He is the current manager for Liga Nacional club Zacapa.

== Club career ==
García Arias played in some of the most important teams of Mexico, including Querétaro.

== International career ==
In 2002, García Arias played two games with Mexico at the 2002 CONCACAF Gold Cup.
