= José Pilar Moreno =

Mexican politician

Deputy of the Congress of the Union for the 1st district of Aguascalientes
- In office 1 September 2012 – 31 August 2015
- Preceded by: Antonio Arámbula López
- Succeeded by: Gerardo Federico Salas Díaz

Personal details
- Born: 12 October 1959 (age 66) Aguascalientes, Mexico
- Party: PRI
- Occupation: Deputy

José Pilar Moreno Montoya (born 12 October 1959) is a Mexican politician affiliated with the Institutional Revolutionary Party (PRI). He served as a federal deputy in the 62nd Congress from 1 September 2012 to 31 August 2015, representing the first district of Aguascalientes.
