= Gerardo Federico Salas Díaz =

Mexican politician

Deputy of the Congress of the Union for the 1st district of Aguascalientes
- In office 1 September 2015 – 31 August 2018
- Preceded by: José Pilar Moreno
- Succeeded by: Francisco Javier Luevano Nuñez

Personal details
- Born: 25 May 1975 (age 50) Aguascalientes, Aguascalientes, Mexico
- Party: National Action

Gerardo Federico Salas Díaz (born 25 May 1975) in Aguascalientes, Aguascalientes, is a Mexican politician affiliated with the National Action Party (PAN). He served as a federal deputy in the 63rd Congress from 1 September 2015 to 31 August 2018, representing the first district of Aguascalientes.
