= Antonio Arámbula López =

Mexican politician

Municipal president of Jesús María
- Incumbent
- Assumed office 15 October 2019

Deputy of the Congress of the Union for the 1st district of Aguascalientes
- In office 1 September 2009 – 31 August 2012
- Preceded by: Pedro Armendáriz García
- Succeeded by: José Pilar Moreno

Member of the Congress of Aguascalientes from the 13th district
- In office 16 September 2004 – 15 September 2007

Personal details
- Born: 9 December 1968 (age 57) Aguascalientes, Mexico
- Party: PAN
- Occupation: Politician

José Antonio Arámbula López (born 9 December 1968) is a Mexican politician from the National Action Party (PAN). From 2009 to 2012 he served in the Chamber of Deputies during the 61st session of Congress representing Aguascalientes's 1st district.
