= Estadio USBI =

Multi-use stadium in Xalapa, Veracruz, Mexico

The Estadio USBI is a multi-use stadium located in Xalapa, Veracruz. It is currently used mostly for American football matches The stadium has a capacity of 3,500 people.
