= Michoacán F.C. =

Mexican football club

- Full name: Michoacán Fútbol Club
- Founded: 24 October 2020; 5 years ago
- Dissolved: 23 January 2023; 3 years ago
- Ground: Club Deportivo Adagol; Pátzcuaro, Michoacán
- Capacity: 500
- Owner: Grupo Riolom
- Chairman: Abdón Calderón
- Manager: Vacant
- League: Liga TDP – Group X
Home colours	Away colours

Michoacán Fútbol Club was a Mexican football club based in Pátzcuaro, Michoacán. The club was founded on October 24, 2020, and played in the Tercerca División de México, the bottom level division of Mexican football, until it was dissolved on January 23, 2023.

== History ==
In June 2020, Monarcas Morelia was relocated to Mazatlán, Sinaloa and renamed Mazatlán F.C., after this fact, a local businessman began the steps to create a soccer team that would represent the state of Michoacán in Mexican soccer and avoid any relocation in the future. On October 24, 2020, it was announced that the new club would be named Michoacán F.C. to represent the entire state, in addition to informing that the club would be registered in the Tercerca División de México, but with the aim of reaching the Liga MX in a period of five years.

At the beginning of 2021, the club's board began a survey among its followers to choose the city where they would play their home games, the towns of: Pátzcuaro, Morelia, Sahuayo, Apatzingán, Ciudad Hidalgo and Los Reyes were presented as candidates. On July 13, the city of Pátzcuaro was confirmed as the city chosen to host the team's home matches.

At the end of July, the club announced Adrián García Arias as the first coach in its history, and subsequently, the club's shield was released, which makes references to representative elements of the state of Michoacán.

The team officially debuted on September 26, 2021, in the match, the club drew two goals against Delfines de Abasolo, Mauricio Farjeat scored the first goal in the club's history. The team qualified for the promotion play-offs in their first season, however, they were eliminated in the Round of 16 by Gorilas de Juanacatlán.

During the 2022-23 season, the team ran into several financial, administrative, and labor problems because the board of directors created an infrastructure with expenses that were too high for a team of its category, for which reason Michoacán F.C stopped participating in the Liga TDP in January 2023, although the league did not remove it from the game schedule, thus, the organization lost all its matches 1–0. The team went on hiatus for the 2023–24 season.

For the 2024–25 season, Michoacán F.C. gave way to a new club called Deportivo Sahuayo, which began playing in the Liga TDP using the Michoacán team's license. Therefore, Michoacán F.C. continued to maintain official statistical records even though the team virtually disappeared, since Sahuayo has a different board of directors, history, and colors than those established by Michoacán F.C. in 2020.

== Stadium ==
Michoacán F.C. played its home matches in the Club Deportivo Adagol located in the city of Pátzcuaro, Michoacán. The venue has a capacity for 500 spectators.

== Players ==
=== First-team squad ===
As of 23 August 2023

Note: Flags indicate national team as defined under FIFA eligibility rules; some limited exceptions apply. Players may hold more than one non-FIFA nationality.

No. / Pos. / Nation / Player	No. / Pos. / Nation / Player
