= Pabellón de Arteaga =

City in the Mexican state of Aguascalientes

- City
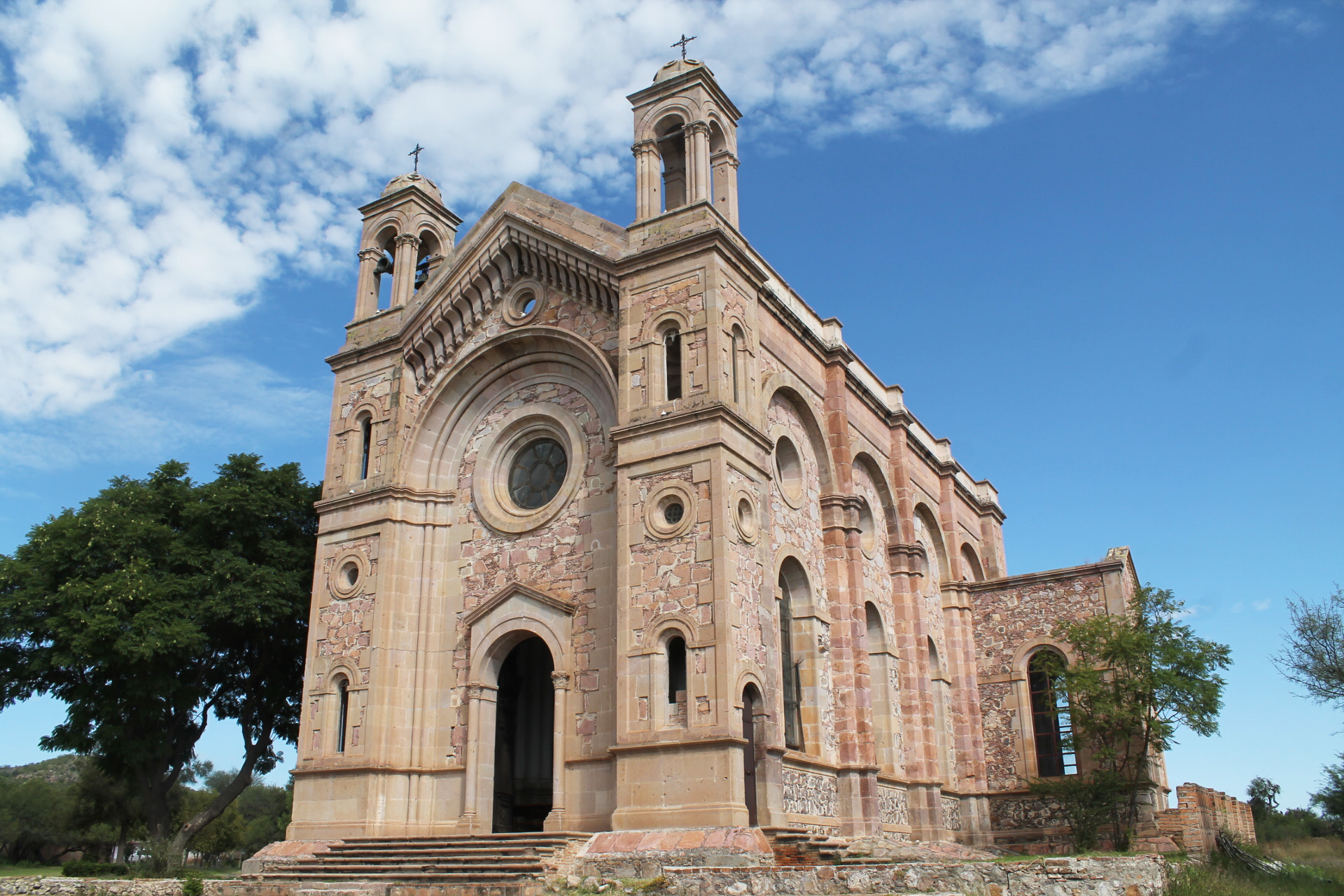
- Templo de San Isidro Labrador in the Hacienda de Garabato

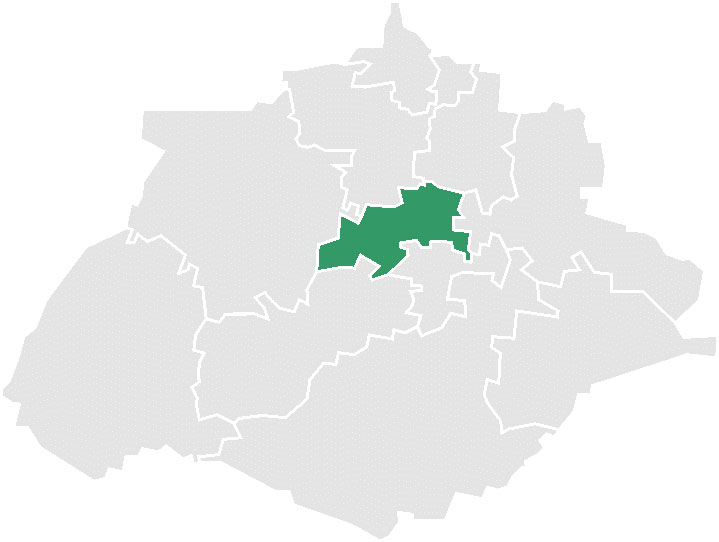
- Municipality location in Aguascalientes

- Location in Mexico Pabellón de Arteaga (Mexico)
- Coordinates: 22°09′N 102°16′W
- Country: Mexico
- State: Aguascalientes
- Municipality: Pabellón de Arteaga
- Founded: 14 May 1929

Government
  - Municipal President: Lucero Espinoza Vázquez (PAN)
  - Federal electoral district: Aguascalientes's 1st

Population (2020)
  - Total: 47,646

Pabellón de Arteaga is a city in the Mexican state of Aguascalientes. It stands at 22°09′N 102°16′W in the central part of the state. The city serves as the municipal seat of the municipality of Pabellón de Arteaga. As of 2010, the city had a total population of 28,633, up from 26,797 in 2005. It is the third-largest city in the state behind Aguascalientes and Jesús María.

Its principal public party is on November 20 in a party called Feria de La Revolucion who commemorates the national uprising against Porfirio Díaz in 1910. Most of the people in this town study and work in the city of Aguascalientes. It is a half hour drive from Pabellon de Arteaga to Aguascalientes. Also every half hour a public transportation service called Las Combis go to Aguascalientes.

Pabellon has three high schools, two junior high schools, and several elementary schools. On Mondays a traveling marketplace called "El Tianguis" set shop on the streets of Pabellon.

== Geography ==
=== Climate ===
Climate data for Pabellón de Arteaga (1991–2020)
Month	Jan	Feb	Mar	Apr	May	Jun	Jul	Aug	Sep	Oct	Nov	Dec	Year
Record high °C (°F)	31.0 (87.8)	32.5 (90.5)	36.0 (96.8)	38.5 (101.3)	39.5 (103.1)	37.0 (98.6)	35.0 (95.0)	34.5 (94.1)	34.0 (93.2)	35.0 (95.0)	32.5 (90.5)	30.5 (86.9)	39.5 (103.1)
Mean daily maximum °C (°F)	23.0 (73.4)	25.3 (77.5)	27.8 (82.0)	30.0 (86.0)	31.6 (88.9)	30.4 (86.7)	28.5 (83.3)	28.5 (83.3)	27.3 (81.1)	27.1 (80.8)	25.4 (77.7)	23.5 (74.3)	27.4 (81.3)
Daily mean °C (°F)	13.5 (56.3)	15.5 (59.9)	17.8 (64.0)	20.3 (68.5)	22.4 (72.3)	22.8 (73.0)	21.4 (70.5)	21.4 (70.5)	20.5 (68.9)	18.8 (65.8)	16.2 (61.2)	14.1 (57.4)	18.7 (65.7)
Mean daily minimum °C (°F)	4.1 (39.4)	5.7 (42.3)	7.9 (46.2)	10.6 (51.1)	13.2 (55.8)	15.2 (59.4)	14.3 (57.7)	14.2 (57.6)	13.7 (56.7)	10.6 (51.1)	7.0 (44.6)	4.7 (40.5)	10.1 (50.2)
Record low °C (°F)	−3.5 (25.7)	−2.5 (27.5)	−2.0 (28.4)	2.0 (35.6)	6.0 (42.8)	10.0 (50.0)	5.0 (41.0)	8.5 (47.3)	6.0 (42.8)	1.5 (34.7)	−1.5 (29.3)	−6.0 (21.2)	−6.0 (21.2)
Average precipitation mm (inches)	19.3 (0.76)	11.7 (0.46)	5.8 (0.23)	3.4 (0.13)	11.8 (0.46)	75.1 (2.96)	105.1 (4.14)	88.9 (3.50)	80.9 (3.19)	34.2 (1.35)	8.7 (0.34)	8.3 (0.33)	453.2 (17.84)
Average precipitation days (≥ 0.1 mm)	2.6	2.0	1.2	1.5	4.1	10.3	13.8	11.6	10.7	4.8	2.0	1.7	66.3
Source: Servicio Meteorologico Nacional
