= Sayula, Jalisco =

Sayula
- Municipality and town
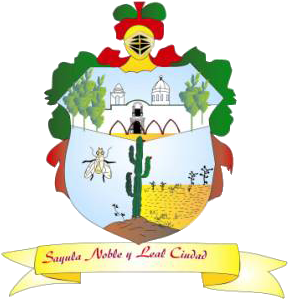
- Coat of arms

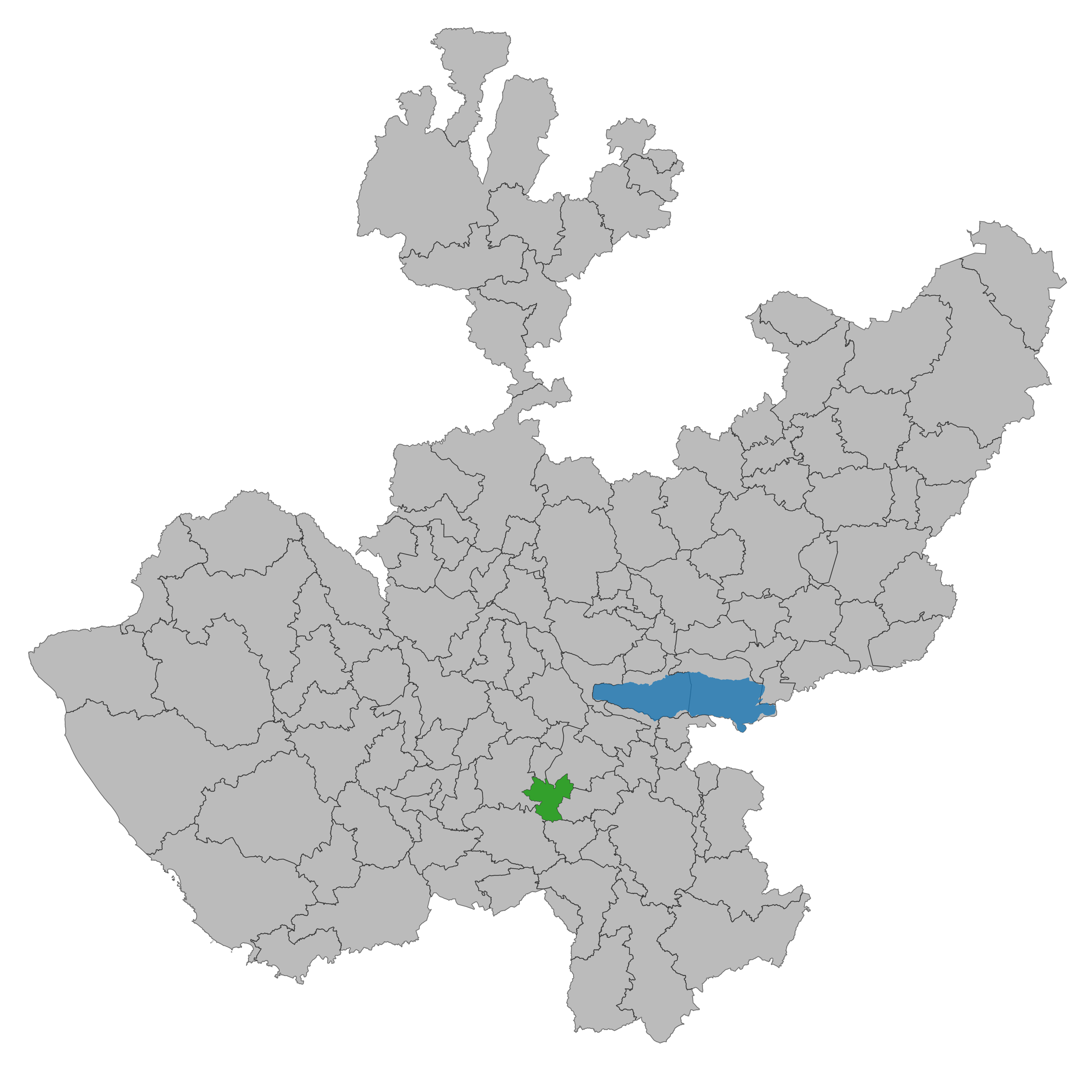
- Location of the municipality in Jalisco

- Location in Mexico
- Coordinates: 19°52′N 103°37′W
- Country: Mexico
- State: Jalisco

Area
  - Total: 216 km^{2} (83 sq mi)
  - Town: 7.13 km^{2} (2.75 sq mi)

Population (2020 census)
  - Total: 37,186
  - Density: 172/km^{2} (446/sq mi)
  - Town: 28,145
  - Town density: 3,950/km^{2} (10,200/sq mi)

Sayula is a town and municipality in the Mexican state of Jalisco, approximately 100 kilometers south of Guadalajara. It is surrounded by smaller towns, such as Usmajac, San Andres, El Reparo, and Amacueca.

Sayula is the birthplace of influential Mexican novelist and short story writer Juan Rulfo. According to the official page of Juan Rulfo, he was born in Apulco, Jalisco, which is close to San Gabriel, Jalisco, and his birth was registered in Sayula, Jalisco. (1917: Nacimiento de Juan Rulfo, el 16 de mayo. Él sostuvo haber venido al mundo en Apulco, localidad cercana a San Gabriel, Jalisco. Es registrado en la ciudad de Sayula, Jalisco.)

Sayula is a traditional Mexican town. Its population is 28,145 (2020 census). It has a "plaza" that holds many festivities. During the holidays, some of its downtown streets are closed to hold a great market (mercado) full of various merchandise to sell and buy. Sayula's downtown church is one that excites the admiration of visitors.

Sayula is also known for its exquisite cajeta (caramel), as well as its chapels and cathedral. Sayula holds many festivities such as the Sayula Carnaval, which draws inspiration from the Brazilian Carnival.

In 2023, Sayula was designated a Pueblo Mágico by the Mexican government, recognizing its cultural and historical importance.

== History ==
In the early 1870s, according to John Lewis Geiger, who was making a voyage across Mexico at the time; Sayula was at the time involved in the production of salt and pulque. From his account, the town was described as having badly-paved roads and being filled with white-washed, low adobe houses. In the 1890s, Sayula is reported to have had a population of approximately 10,655. During this same period, the town had a variety of merchants of goods from carriages and ironware, to arms and ammunition. In 1974 sailing vessel Sayula 2 skippered by Ramón Carlín won the round the world regatta, as documented in the "Weekend sailor" movie.

== Government ==
=== Municipal presidents ===
Municipal president	Term	Political party	Notes
Vicente Morett y Figueroa	1823		
Francisco Monroy	1823–1825		
Pedro León de la Cueva	1825		
Manuel Pardo de Malhabear	1826		
Francisco Morett	1827		
Joaquín de Padilla	1829		
Lorenzo Valle	No date		
Miguel Morett	1841		
Francisco de la Fuente	1843		
Luiz de la Plaza	1853		
Claudio Gutiérrez	1853		
Agustín Carrión	1855		
Antonio Bobadilla	1856		
José María Tolsá	1857		
Domingo Reyes	1858		
Santiago Aguilar	1858		
J. Jesús Vázquez Lomelín	1859		
Silvano Camberos	1859		
Agustín Carrión	1861		
Sinforoso Banda	1861		
Tomás Chávez	1862		
Silvano Camberos	1863		
Antonio L. Bobadilla	1866		
Antonio R. de la Vega	1867–1868		
Eufrasio Carrión	1868–1870		
Antonio E. Naredo	1870		
Francisco de la Madrid	1870		
Pascual Dueñas	1870		
Eufrasio Carrión	1873–1875		
Nicanor Rodríguez	1875		
Antonio E. Romero	1875		
J. A. Carranza	1876		
José Urrea	1876		
D. I. G. Ruvalcaba	1877		
J. Jesús L. Patiño	1877–1882		
José J. Vázquez	1882		
Miguel Vizcaíno	1882–1884		
Laureano González Escobar	1884		
Benigno Larios	1885		
J. Félix Vélez	1885		
Miguel Jaque	1885		
José Bobadilla	1885		
Tomás Zúñiga	1885		
Juan J. Navarro	1885–1887		
J. Jesús L. Patiño	1887–1890		
Juan J. Navarro	1890		
Paulino Preciado	1893		
Vidal Gómez	1893		
Ignacio G. Ruvalcaba	1893–1894		
Vidal Gómez	1894		
Vicente Palacios	1894		
Vidal Gómez	1895–1901		
Adolfo E. Romero	1901–1903		
Hilario González	1903		
Adolfo E. Romero	1903–1906		
Ismael Padilla	1906–1907		
Hilario González	1907–1909		
Margarito González Rubio	1909–1911		
Carlos Ceballos	1911		
Adolfo E. Romero	1911		
Eutimio Chávez	1911		
José María Contreras	1911		
Antonio L. Larios	1911–1912		
Adolfo E. Romero	1912–1913		
Carlos González Guerra	1913		
Adolfo E. Romero	1913–1914		
Daniel Aguilar	1914–1916		
Antonio N. Larios	1917		
Francisco Valdez	1917		
Arturo Gálvez	1918		
Urbano Gómez	1919		
Lauro González Guerra J.	1920		
Francisco González	1920		
José María Anaya	1920		
J. Jesús Chávez	1921		
Arturo Gálvez	1922		
Urbano Gómez	1923		
Aurelio García	1924		
Graciano García	1924–1925		
Conrado Romo	1925		
José Ayala	1925		
J. Mújica	1925		
Secundino Delgadillo	1925		
Miguel Estrada	1926		
Eduardo Valdominos	1927		
Raymundo Ochoa	1927		
Heliodoro Ruvalcaba	1928		
Melesio Contreras	1928		
Felipe G. Alfaro	1928		
Ignacio Corona	1928–1929		
Olivio Fernández	1930	PNR	
Vidal Villalvazo	1930	PNR	
Olivio Fernández	1931	PNR	
Vidal Villalvazo	1931	PNR	
Ernesto Navarro	1932	PNR	
Herculano Francisco Anguiano	1933	PNR	
J. Jesús Cisneros Gómez	1933	PNR	
J. Jesús Rodríguez	1934	PNR	
Lorenzo Ponce	1935	PNR	
Candelario Ochoa	1935	PNR	
Genaro M. Ocaranza	1935	PNR	
Salvador Díaz Negrete	1937	PNR	
Feliciano Morales	1937	PNR	
Ignacio Cisneros Gómez	1938	PRM	
Justo Contreras Aguilar	01-01-1939–31-12-1940	PRM	
Miguel Chávez Álvarez	01-01-1941–31-12-1942	PRM	
Federico L. González	01-01-1943–31-12-1944	PRM	
Salvador M. Aréchiga	01-01-1945–31-12-1946	PRM; PRI	
Salvador Díaz y Díaz	1947	PRI	
Rubén E. Chávez Rojas	1947–1948	PRI	
Fernando Valencia Gutiérrez	1948	PRI	
Leopoldo Anaya Díaz	1949–1952	PRI	
Salvador Pérez Gutiérrez	1952	PRI	
Francisco S. Manzo	1953–1955	PRI	
Daniel González Guerra	1956	PRI	
Miguel Michel Victoria	1956–1958	PRI	
Alfredo Rodríguez Beas	01-01-1959–31-12-1961	PRI	
J. Jesús Tovar Hernández	01-01-1962–31-12-1964	PRI	
Alfonso González Díaz	01-01-1965–31-12-1967	PRI	
José María Barba Olivares	01-01-1968–31-12-1970	PRI	
Ignacio Díaz Larios	01-01-1971–31-12-1973	PRI	
Rubén Chávez Wideman	01-01-1974–31-12-1976	PRI	
Rodolfo Arias Covarrubias	01-01-1977–31-12-1979	PRI	
Maximiliano González Michel	01-01-1980–31-12-1982	PRI	
Rafael Chávez Arellano	01-01-1983–1985	PRI	
Nicolás Eguiarte Vázquez	1985	PRI	Acting municipal president
Jorge Ventura Torres	01-01-1986–31-12-1988	PRI	
Marcelino Torres Carrillo	01-01-1989–1992	PRI	
Gerardo Villalobos Arroyo	1992–1995	PRI	
Miguel Mario Anguiano Aguilar	1995–1997	PAN	
Primitivo Curiel García	1997	PAN	Acting municipal president
Samuel Rivas Peña	01-01-1998–31-12-2000	PRD	
José María García Arteaga	01-01-2001–31-12-2003	PRI	
Samuel Rivas Peña	01-01-2004–31-12-2006	PRD	
Andrés Sánchez Sánchez	01-01-2007–31-12-2009	PVEM	
Samuel Rivas Peña	01-01-2010–30-09-2012	PRD	
Jorge González Figueroa	01-10-2012–30-09-2015	PRI; PVEM	Coalition "Compromise for Jalisco"
Jorge Campos Aguilar	01-10-2015–30-09-2018	PRD	
Óscar Daniel Carrión Calvario	01-10-2018–05-03-2021		Independent candidate. He applied for a temporary leave, to run for reelection, backed by Citizens' Movement (MC)
Víctor Cerón	05-03-2021–2021		Acting municipal president
Óscar Daniel Carrión Calvario	01-10-2021–30-09-2024	MC	He was reelected on 6 June 2021
Jazmín Carrión Calvario	01-10-2024–	MC	
