= 2023–24 Liga TDP season =

Liga TDP
- Season: 2023–24
- Dates: 7 September 2023 – 31 May 2024
- Champions: Faraones de Texcoco (1st title)
- Matches: 2,635
- Goals: 8,303 (3.15 per match)
- Top goalscorer: Efrén Hernández (40 goals)
- Stats are from the regular season only

The 2023–24 Liga TDP season is the fourth-tier football league of Mexico. The tournament began on 7 September 2023 and finished on 31 May 2024.

== Competition format ==
The Tercera División (Third Division) is divided into 17 groups. Since the 2009–2010 season, the format of the tournament has been reorganized to a home and away format, which all teams will play in their respective group. The 17 groups consist of teams which are eligible to play in the liguilla de ascenso (promotion play–offs) for four promotion spots, teams who are affiliated with teams in the Liga MX, Liga de Expansión MX and Liga Premier and development teams, which are not eligible for promotion but will play that who the better team in a sixteen team reserves playoff tournament for the entire season.

The regulation awards three points for a win, one point for a tie and zero points for a loss, however, when a match ends tied, a penalty shoot-out is played to award a bonus point to the winning team of the penalty series.

The league format allows participating franchises to rent their place to another team, so some clubs compete with a different name than the one registered with the FMF.

For the 2023–24 season there will be four promotions to the Liga Premier. Two to Serie A and two to Serie B.

== Group 1 ==
Group with 14 teams from Campeche, Chiapas, Quintana Roo, Tabasco and Yucatán.

Location of teams in the 2023–24 Liga TDP Group 1 (Campeche)
Location of teams in the 2023–24 Liga TDP Group 1 (Quintana Roo)
Location of teams in the 2023–24 Liga TDP Group 1 (Chiapas and Tabasco)
Location of teams in the 2023–24 Liga TDP Group 1 (Yucatán)

=== Teams ===
| Team | City | Home ground | Capacity | Affiliate | Official Name |
|---|---|---|---|---|---|
| Boston Cancún | Cancún, Quintana Roo | CEDAR Cancún | 1,000 | Cancún | — |
| Campeche | Campeche, Campeche | La Muralla de Kin-Ha | 500 | — | — |
| Chetumal | Chetumal, Quintana Roo | José López Portillo | 6,600 | Yalmakán | – |
| Corsarios de Campeche | Campeche, Campeche | Universitario de Campeche | 4,000 | — | — |
| Deportiva Venados | Tamanché, Yucatán | Alonso Diego Molina | 2,500 | Deportiva Venados | — |
| Felinos 48 | Reforma, Chiapas | Cancha Unidad y Compromiso | 600 | – | – |
| Inter Playa del Carmen | Playa del Carmen, Quintana Roo | Unidad Deportiva Mario Villanueva Madrid | 7,500 | Inter Playa del Carmen | — |
| ISG Sport | Ciudad del Carmen, Campeche | Unidad Deportiva 20 de Noviembre | 1,000 | – | – |
| Mons Calpe Yucatán | Telchac Pueblo, Yucatán | San Pedro | 1,000 | Mons Calpe | – |
| Napoli Tabasco | Villahermosa, Tabasco | Olímpico de Villahermosa | 12,000 | Zitácuaro | Zitácuaro |
| Pampaneros de Champotón | Champotón, Campeche | Nou Camp Champotón | 1,000 | – | – |
| Pioneros Junior | Cancún, Quintana Roo | Cancún 86 | 6,390 | Cancún | — |
| Progreso | Progreso, Yucatán | 20 de Noviembre | 3,000 | Venados | — |
| Zorros Puerto Morelos | Puerto Morelos, Quintana Roo | Unidad Deportiva Colonia Pescadores | 1,200 | – | – |

=== League table ===
| Pos | Team | Pld | W | D | L | GF | GA | GD | BP | Pts | Qualification or relegation |
|---|---|---|---|---|---|---|---|---|---|---|---|
| 1 | Pioneros Junior (Q) | 26 | 18 | 7 | 1 | 69 | 20 | +49 | 2 | 63 | Advance to Liguilla de Ascenso |
| 2 | Inter Playa del Carmen (Q) | 26 | 17 | 6 | 3 | 58 | 27 | +31 | 3 | 60 | Advance to Liguilla de Ascenso |
| 3 | Deportiva Venados (Q) | 26 | 17 | 6 | 3 | 55 | 16 | +39 | 2 | 59 | Advance to Liguilla de Filiales |
| 4 | Progreso (Q) | 26 | 14 | 8 | 4 | 47 | 26 | +21 | 5 | 55 | Advance to Liguilla de Ascenso |
| 5 | Zorros Puerto Morelos | 26 | 12 | 10 | 4 | 40 | 23 | +17 | 6 | 52 | |
| 6 | Boston Cancún (Q) | 26 | 14 | 4 | 8 | 49 | 30 | +19 | 2 | 48 | Advance to Liguilla de Filiales |
| 7 | Mons Calpe Yucatán | 26 | 13 | 5 | 8 | 28 | 21 | +7 | 2 | 46 | |
| 8 | Felinos 48 | 26 | 11 | 4 | 11 | 32 | 31 | +1 | 3 | 40 | |
| 9 | Chetumal | 26 | 10 | 2 | 14 | 31 | 46 | −15 | 2 | 34 | |
| 10 | Pampaneros de Champotón | 26 | 6 | 6 | 14 | 33 | 50 | −17 | 4 | 28 | |
| 11 | Corsarios de Campeche | 26 | 6 | 5 | 15 | 19 | 45 | −26 | 1 | 24 | |
| 12 | Campeche | 26 | 4 | 3 | 19 | 24 | 55 | −31 | 0 | 15 | |
| 13 | ISG Sport | 26 | 3 | 4 | 19 | 14 | 49 | −35 | 2 | 15 | |
| 14 | Napoli Tabasco | 26 | 1 | 2 | 23 | 16 | 76 | −60 | 2 | 7 | |

Updated to match(es) played on 20 April 2024. Source: Liga TDP
(Q) Qualified for the phase indicated

== Group 2 ==
Group with 13 teams from Chiapas and Oaxaca.

=== Teams ===
Location of teams in the 2023–24 Liga TDP Group 2 (Chiapas)
Location of teams in the 2023–24 Liga TDP Group 2 (Oaxaca)

| Team | City | Home ground | Capacity | Affiliate | Official name |
|---|---|---|---|---|---|
| Academia Dragones | Zimatlán de Álvarez, Oaxaca | Unidad Deportiva Ignacio Mejía | 1,000 | – | – |
| Alebrijes de Oaxaca | Oaxaca City, Oaxaca | Tecnológico de Oaxaca | 14,598 | Alebrijes de Oaxaca | – |
| Antequera | Oaxaca City, Oaxaca | Tecnológico de Oaxaca | 14,598 | – | – |
| Atlético Ixtepec | Santo Domingo Ingenio, Oaxaca | La SOP | 1,000 | — | – |
| Búhos de Oaxaca | Oaxaca City, Oaxaca | Deportivo Ramos | 1,000 | – | – |
| CEFOR Chiapas | Tuxtla Gutiérrez, Chiapas | Flor de Sospo | 3,000 | – | – |
| Cruz Azul Lagunas | Lagunas, Oaxaca | Cruz Azul | 2,000 | Cruz Azul | – |
| Dragones de Oaxaca | Zimatlán de Álvarez, Oaxaca | Unidad Deportiva Ignacio Mejía | 1,000 | – | – |
| Estudiantes del COBACH | Tuxtla Gutiérrez, Chiapas | Flor de Sospo | 3,000 | – | Deportivo Soria |
| Lechuzas UPGCH | Tuxtla Gutiérrez, Chiapas | Flor de Sospo | 3,000 | – | – |
| Milenarios de Oaxaca | San Pablo Villa de Mitla, Oaxaca | Municipal San Pablo Villa de Mitla | 1,000 | – | – |
| Profutsoccer | San Cristóbal de las Casas, Chiapas | Municipal de San Cristóbal de las Casas | 4,000 | – | – |
| Universidad del Sureste | Comitán de Domínguez, Chiapas | Centro de Formación UDS | 500 | — | — |

=== League table ===
| Pos | Team | Pld | W | D | L | GF | GA | GD | BP | Pts | Qualification or relegation |
|---|---|---|---|---|---|---|---|---|---|---|---|
| 1 | Dragones de Oaxaca (Q) | 24 | 17 | 4 | 3 | 57 | 18 | +39 | 3 | 58 | Advance to Liguilla de Ascenso |
| 2 | Cruz Azul Lagunas (Q) | 24 | 15 | 5 | 4 | 58 | 25 | +33 | 2 | 52 | Advance to Liguilla de Ascenso |
| 3 | Estudiantes del COBACH (Q) | 24 | 13 | 8 | 3 | 41 | 12 | +29 | 5 | 52 | Advance to Liguilla de Ascenso |
| 4 | Lechuzas UPGCH (Q) | 24 | 14 | 6 | 4 | 44 | 26 | +18 | 1 | 49 | Advance to Liguilla de Ascenso |
| 5 | Universidad del Sureste | 24 | 13 | 4 | 7 | 51 | 31 | +20 | 2 | 45 | |
| 6 | Alebrijes de Oaxaca (Q) | 24 | 11 | 8 | 5 | 39 | 22 | +17 | 4 | 45 | Advance to Liguilla de Filiales |
| 7 | Profutsoccer | 24 | 10 | 5 | 9 | 40 | 32 | +8 | 2 | 37 | |
| 8 | Búhos de Oaxaca | 24 | 7 | 8 | 9 | 37 | 39 | −2 | 5 | 34 | |
| 9 | Academia Dragones | 24 | 6 | 6 | 12 | 30 | 47 | −17 | 3 | 27 | |
| 10 | Antequera | 24 | 6 | 5 | 13 | 24 | 39 | −15 | 3 | 26 | |
| 11 | CEFOR Chiapas | 24 | 5 | 5 | 14 | 24 | 48 | −24 | 4 | 24 | |
| 12 | Atlético Ixtepec | 24 | 2 | 4 | 18 | 25 | 71 | −46 | 1 | 11 | |
| 13 | Milenarios de Oaxaca | 24 | 2 | 2 | 20 | 23 | 83 | −60 | 0 | 8 | |

Updated to match(es) played on 20 April 2024. Source: Liga TDP
(Q) Qualified for the phase indicated

== Group 3 ==
Group with 16 teams from Puebla and Veracruz.

=== Teams ===
Location of teams in the 2023–24 Liga TDP Group 3 (Puebla and Tlaxcala)
Location of teams in the 2023–24 Liga TDP Group 3 (Oaxaca and Veracruz)

| Team | City | Home ground | Capacity | Affiliate | Official Name |
|---|---|---|---|---|---|
| Académicos UGM | Orizaba, Veracruz | Universitario UGM | 1,500 | — | — |
| Águila Azteca | Chocamán, Veracruz | El Mariscal | 2,000 | – | – |
| Atlante Xalapa | Xalapa Enríquez, Veracruz | Unidad Deportiva UV Campus CAD | 1,000 | Atlante | – |
| Caballeros de Córdoba | Córdoba, Veracruz | Rafael Murillo Vidal | 3,800 | — | — |
| Conejos de Tuxtepec | Tuxtepec, Oaxaca | Gustavo Pacheco Villaseñor | 15,000 | — | — |
| Córdoba | Córdoba, Veracruz | Rafael Murillo Vidal | 3,800 | — | – |
| Delfines UGM | Nogales, Veracruz | UGM Nogales | 1,500 | — | — |
| Diablos Blancos | Mazatecochco, Tlaxcala | San José del Agua | 1,000 | – | Unión Magdalena Contreras |
| Guerreros de Puebla | Puebla, Puebla | Unidad Deportiva Mario Vázquez Raña | 800 | – | – |
| Licántropos | Cuautinchán, Puebla | Campos El Cóndor | 500 | — | — |
| Lobos Puebla | Puebla, Puebla | Universitario BUAP | 19,283 | — | — |
| Los Ángeles | Puebla, Puebla | Unidad Deportiva Mario Vázquez Raña | 800 | — | — |
| PDLA | San Pedro Cholula, Puebla | Unidad Deportiva San Pedro Cholula | 1,000 | – | – |
| Reales de Puebla | Amozoc, Puebla | Unidad Deportiva Chachapa | 1,000 | — | — |
| Tehuacán | Tehuacán, Puebla | Polideportivo La Huizachera | 1,000 | — | — |
| Xalapa 777 | Xalapa Enríquez, Veracruz | USBI | 4,000 | – | – |

=== League table ===
| Pos | Team | Pld | W | D | L | GF | GA | GD | BP | Pts | Qualification or relegation |
|---|---|---|---|---|---|---|---|---|---|---|---|
| 1 | Delfines UGM (Q) | 30 | 22 | 6 | 2 | 89 | 23 | +66 | 4 | 76 | Advance to Liguilla de Ascenso |
| 2 | Académicos UGM (Q) | 30 | 22 | 4 | 4 | 84 | 23 | +61 | 2 | 72 | Advance to Liguilla de Ascenso |
| 3 | Águila Azteca (Q) | 30 | 22 | 3 | 5 | 97 | 24 | +73 | 0 | 69 | Advance to Liguilla de Ascenso |
| 4 | PDLA (Q) | 30 | 21 | 3 | 6 | 69 | 29 | +40 | 2 | 68 | Advance to Liguilla de Ascenso |
| 5 | Córdoba (Q) | 30 | 19 | 7 | 4 | 64 | 24 | +40 | 3 | 67 | Advance to Liguilla de Ascenso |
| 6 | Caballeros de Córdoba (Q) | 30 | 17 | 7 | 6 | 66 | 26 | +40 | 3 | 61 | Advance to Liguilla de Ascenso |
| 7 | Licántropos | 30 | 14 | 9 | 7 | 78 | 34 | +44 | 5 | 56 | |
| 8 | Diablos Blancos | 30 | 15 | 3 | 12 | 53 | 39 | +14 | 2 | 50 | |
| 9 | Atlante Xalapa | 30 | 12 | 4 | 14 | 58 | 57 | +1 | 2 | 42 | |
| 10 | Tehuacán | 30 | 9 | 7 | 14 | 30 | 36 | −6 | 3 | 37 | |
| 11 | Reales de Puebla | 30 | 9 | 4 | 17 | 37 | 46 | −9 | 1 | 32 | |
| 12 | Lobos Puebla | 30 | 7 | 4 | 19 | 26 | 82 | −56 | 3 | 28 | |
| 13 | Los Ángeles | 30 | 7 | 3 | 20 | 27 | 73 | −46 | 2 | 26 | |
| 14 | Conejos de Tuxtepec | 30 | 6 | 2 | 22 | 23 | 83 | −60 | 0 | 20 | |
| 15 | Xalapa 777 | 30 | 2 | 2 | 26 | 18 | 103 | −85 | 1 | 9 | |
| 16 | Guerreros de Puebla | 30 | 1 | 2 | 27 | 11 | 128 | −117 | 1 | 6 | |

Updated to match(es) played on 20 April 2024. Source: Liga TDP
(Q) Qualified for the phase indicated

== Group 4 ==
Group with 16 teams from Greater Mexico City.

=== Teams ===
Location of teams in the 2023–24 Liga TDP Group 4

| Team | City | Home ground | Capacity | Affiliate | Official name |
|---|---|---|---|---|---|
| Álamos | Iztacalco, Mexico City | Magdalena Mixhuca Sports City Ground 1 | 500 | Guadalajara | – |
| Aragón | Gustavo A. Madero, Mexico City | Deportivo Francisco Zarco | 1,000 | Atlético Aragón | – |
| Atlético Mexicano | Venustiano Carranza, Mexico City | Deportivo Eduardo Molina | 500 | – | – |
| Aztecas AMF Soccer | Gustavo A. Madero, Mexico City | Deportivo Francisco Zarco | 1,000 | – | – |
| Cefor Cuauhtémoc Blanco | Gustavo A. Madero, Mexico City | Deportivo Los Galeana | 1,000 | – | – |
| Cefor Mario Gálvez | Venustiano Carranza, Mexico City | Deportivo Plutarco Elías Calles | 300 | – | Marina |
| Cefor Mexiquense | Ecatepec, State of Mexico | Revolución 30-30 | 1,000 | – | Promodep Central |
| Cefor Muxes | Iztacalco, Mexico City | Magdalena Mixhuca Sports City Ground 1 | 500 | – | Valle de Xico F.C. |
| Cuervos Blancos | Cuautitlán, State of Mexico | Los Pinos | 5,000 | – | – |
| Domínguez Osos | Gustavo A. Madero, Mexico City | Deportivo Miguel Alemán | 500 | – | – |
| Halcones de Rayón | Iztacalco, Mexico City | Magdalena Mixhuca Sports City Ground 1 | 500 | – | – |
| Juárez | Xochimilco, Mexico City | San Isidro La Noria | 1,200 | Juárez | – |
| Muxes | Iztacalco, Mexico City | Magdalena Mixhuca Sports City Ground 1 | 500 | – | – |
| Novillos Neza | Iztacalco, Mexico City | Magdalena Mixhuca Sports City Ground 1 | 500 | – | – |
| Oceanía | Venustiano Carranza, Mexico City | Deportivo Oceanía | 1,000 | – | – |
| Politécnico | Venustiano Carranza, Mexico City | Deportivo Leandro Valle | 1,000 | – | – |

=== League table ===
| Pos | Team | Pld | W | D | L | GF | GA | GD | BP | Pts | Qualification or relegation |
|---|---|---|---|---|---|---|---|---|---|---|---|
| 1 | Muxes (Q) | 30 | 25 | 2 | 3 | 110 | 21 | +89 | 2 | 79 | Advance to Liguilla de Ascenso |
| 2 | Aragón (Q) | 30 | 22 | 6 | 2 | 66 | 18 | +48 | 1 | 73 | Advance to Liguilla de Filiales |
| 3 | Oceanía (Q) | 30 | 19 | 4 | 7 | 49 | 25 | +24 | 3 | 64 | Advance to Liguilla de Ascenso |
| 4 | Juárez (Q) | 30 | 18 | 6 | 6 | 65 | 22 | +43 | 3 | 63 | Advance to Liguilla de Filiales |
| 5 | Politécnico (Q) | 30 | 17 | 7 | 6 | 55 | 31 | +24 | 3 | 61 | Advance to Liguilla de Ascenso |
| 6 | Cuervos Blancos (Q) | 30 | 16 | 4 | 10 | 68 | 39 | +29 | 2 | 54 | Advance to Liguilla de Ascenso |
| 7 | Domínguez Osos (Q) | 30 | 16 | 2 | 12 | 48 | 36 | +12 | 0 | 50 | Advance to Liguilla de Ascenso |
| 8 | Álamos | 30 | 11 | 8 | 11 | 43 | 45 | −2 | 7 | 48 | |
| 9 | Cefor Cuauhtémoc Blanco | 30 | 9 | 9 | 12 | 45 | 43 | +2 | 7 | 43 | |
| 10 | Halcones de Rayón | 30 | 8 | 5 | 17 | 30 | 55 | −25 | 3 | 32 | |
| 11 | Atlético Mexicano | 30 | 7 | 6 | 17 | 35 | 66 | −31 | 4 | 31 | |
| 12 | Cefor Mario Gálvez | 30 | 8 | 6 | 16 | 35 | 47 | −12 | 0 | 30 | |
| 13 | Cefor Muxes | 30 | 7 | 6 | 17 | 39 | 68 | −29 | 2 | 29 | |
| 14 | Aztecas AMF Soccer | 30 | 8 | 4 | 18 | 29 | 67 | −38 | 1 | 29 | |
| 15 | Novillos Neza | 30 | 6 | 5 | 19 | 32 | 96 | −64 | 2 | 25 | |
| 16 | Cefor Mexiquense | 30 | 1 | 4 | 25 | 14 | 84 | −70 | 2 | 9 | |

Updated to match(es) played on 20 April 2024. Source: Liga TDP
(Q) Qualified for the phase indicated

== Group 5 ==
Group with 16 teams from Greater Mexico City.

=== Teams ===
Location of teams in the 2023–24 Liga TDP Group 5
Location of teams in the 2023–24 Liga TDP Group 5 (Rural Greater Mexico City)

| Team | City | Home ground | Capacity | Affiliate | Official name |
|---|---|---|---|---|---|
| Academia Mineros CDMX | Iztacalco, Mexico City | Magdalena Mixhuca Sports City Ground 1 | 500 | – | CH Fútbol Club |
| Arietes | Huixquilucan de Degollado, State of Mexico | Alberto Pérez Navarro | 3,000 | – | – |
| Cañoneros | Milpa Alta, Mexico City | Momoxco | 3,500 | Cañoneros | – |
| CARSAF | Venustiano Carranza, Mexico City | Deportivo Lázaro Cárdenas | 1,000 | – | Azucareros de Tezonapa |
| CILESI | Xochimilco, Mexico City | San Isidro | 1,200 | – | – |
| Cordobés | Huixquilucan de Degollado, State of Mexico | Alberto Pérez Navarro | 3,000 | – | – |
| Coyotes Neza | Venustiano Carranza, Mexico City | Deportivo Oceanía | 1,000 | – | Halcones Zúñiga |
| Cuemanco | Benito Juárez, Mexico City | Deportivo Benito Juárez | 800 | – | Atlético Pachuca |
| Ecatepec | Ecatepec de Morelos, State of Mexico | Guadalupe Victoria | 1,000 | – | – |
| Escuela Necaxa Coyoacán | Coyoacán, Mexico City | Deportivo Rosario Iglesias | 600 | – | San José del Arenal |
| Guerreros DDios | Xochimilco, Mexico City | San Isidro | 1,200 | – | – |
| Héroes de Zaci | Xochimilco, Mexico City | San Isidro | 1,200 | – | – |
| Independiente Mexiquense | Huehuetoca, State of Mexico | 12 de Mayo | 1,500 | – | – |
| Olimpo | Xochimilco, Mexico City | Valentín González | 2,500 | – | Colegio Once México |
| Sangre de Campeón | Tultitlán, State of Mexico | Cancha Nou Camp | 1,000 | – | – |
| Unión | Ecatepec, State of Mexico | Titanium Soccer | 500 | – | – |

=== League table ===
| Pos | Team | Pld | W | D | L | GF | GA | GD | BP | Pts | Qualification or relegation |
|---|---|---|---|---|---|---|---|---|---|---|---|
| 1 | Cordobés (Q) | 30 | 25 | 3 | 2 | 104 | 18 | +86 | 2 | 80 | Advance to Liguilla de Ascenso |
| 2 | Guerreros DDios (Q) | 30 | 15 | 12 | 3 | 54 | 28 | +26 | 8 | 65 | Advance to Liguilla de Ascenso |
| 3 | Héroes de Zaci (Q) | 30 | 16 | 9 | 5 | 61 | 25 | +36 | 6 | 63 | Advance to Liguilla de Ascenso |
| 4 | Arietes (Q) | 30 | 19 | 5 | 6 | 66 | 35 | +31 | 1 | 63 | Advance to Liguilla de Ascenso |
| 5 | Academia Mineros CDMX (Q) | 30 | 16 | 7 | 7 | 62 | 37 | +25 | 3 | 58 | Advance to Liguilla de Ascenso |
| 6 | Independiente Mexiquense (Q) | 30 | 13 | 7 | 10 | 50 | 35 | +15 | 4 | 50 | Advance to Liguilla de Ascenso |
| 7 | Sangre de Campeón | 30 | 13 | 5 | 12 | 46 | 47 | −1 | 2 | 46 | |
| 8 | Olimpo | 30 | 11 | 7 | 12 | 32 | 40 | −8 | 4 | 44 | |
| 9 | Ecatepec | 30 | 10 | 9 | 11 | 44 | 44 | 0 | 3 | 42 | |
| 10 | CARSAF | 30 | 10 | 5 | 15 | 44 | 59 | −15 | 3 | 38 | |
| 11 | Unión | 30 | 9 | 6 | 15 | 34 | 61 | −27 | 1 | 34 | |
| 12 | Cuemanco | 30 | 7 | 6 | 17 | 47 | 79 | −32 | 4 | 31 | |
| 13 | Coyotes Neza | 30 | 8 | 4 | 18 | 42 | 64 | −22 | 2 | 30 | |
| 14 | Cañoneros | 30 | 7 | 5 | 18 | 32 | 75 | −43 | 4 | 30 | |
| 15 | CILESI | 30 | 6 | 4 | 20 | 35 | 61 | −26 | 3 | 25 | |
| 16 | Escuela Necaxa Coyoacán | 30 | 5 | 6 | 19 | 39 | 84 | −45 | 0 | 21 | |

Updated to match(es) played on 20 April 2024. Source: Liga TDP
(Q) Qualified for the phase indicated

== Group 6 ==
Group with 12 teams from Hidalgo and State of Mexico.

Location of teams in the 2023–24 Liga TDP Group 6

=== Teams ===
| Team | City | Home ground | Capacity | Affiliate | Official name |
|---|---|---|---|---|---|
| Artesanos Metepec | Metepec, State of Mexico | La Hortaliza | 2,000 | Artesanos Metepec | – |
| Ciervos | Chalco, State of Mexico | Arreola | 3,217 | Ciervos | – |
| Estudiantes | Atlacomulco, State of Mexico | Municipal de Atlacomulco | 2,000 | – | – |
| Eurosoccer | Santa María Rayón, State of Mexico | Unidad Deportiva Dionicio Cerón | 1,000 | – | Deportivo Metepec |
| FORMAFUTINTEGRAL | Ixtapaluca, State of Mexico | Campo La Era | 1,000 | – | – |
| Leones Huixquilucan | Huixquilucan de Degollado, State of Mexico | Alberto Pérez Navarro | 3,000 | – | – |
| Orishas Tepeji | Tepeji, Hidalgo | Tepeji | 2,000 | – | – |
| Panteras Neza | Ciudad Nezahualcóyotl, State of Mexico | Metropolitano de Neza | 1,500 | – | Atlante Chalco |
| Polotitlán | Polotitlán, State of Mexico | Unidad Deportiva Polotitlán | 1,000 | – | Saraguatos de Palenque |
| Proyecto México Soccer | Santa María Rayón, State of Mexico | Unidad Deportiva Dionicio Cerón | 1,000 | – | Grupo Sherwood |
| Tenancingo | Tenancingo, State of Mexico | JM "Grillo" Cruzalta | 3,000 | – | Fuerza Mazahua |
| Toluca | Metepec, State of Mexico | Instalaciones de Metepec | 1,000 | Toluca | – |

=== League table ===
| Pos | Team | Pld | W | D | L | GF | GA | GD | BP | Pts | Qualification or relegation |
|---|---|---|---|---|---|---|---|---|---|---|---|
| 1 | Artesanos Metepec (Q) | 22 | 19 | 1 | 2 | 59 | 12 | +47 | 0 | 58 | Advance to Liguilla de Filiales |
| 2 | Orishas Tepeji (Q) | 22 | 16 | 3 | 3 | 51 | 18 | +33 | 3 | 54 | Advance to Liguilla de Ascenso |
| 3 | Toluca (Q) | 22 | 15 | 3 | 4 | 60 | 23 | +37 | 2 | 50 | Advance to Liguilla de Filiales |
| 4 | Estudiantes (Q) | 22 | 13 | 6 | 3 | 46 | 17 | +29 | 2 | 47 | Advance to Liguilla de Ascenso |
| 5 | Panteras Neza (Q) | 22 | 13 | 2 | 7 | 38 | 21 | +17 | 1 | 42 | Advance to Liguilla de Filiales |
| 6 | Leones Huixquilucan | 22 | 9 | 4 | 9 | 28 | 29 | −1 | 4 | 35 | |
| 7 | Tenancingo | 22 | 10 | 3 | 9 | 29 | 29 | 0 | 1 | 34 | |
| 8 | FORMAFUTINTEGRAL | 22 | 7 | 4 | 11 | 22 | 33 | −11 | 0 | 25 | |
| 9 | Proyecto México Soccer | 22 | 6 | 4 | 12 | 27 | 35 | −8 | 2 | 24 | |
| 10 | Polotitlán | 22 | 2 | 4 | 16 | 15 | 60 | −45 | 2 | 12 | |
| 11 | Ciervos | 22 | 3 | 1 | 18 | 13 | 62 | −49 | 0 | 10 | |
| 12 | Eurosoccer | 22 | 1 | 1 | 20 | 7 | 56 | −49 | 1 | 5 | |

Updated to match(es) played on 20 April 2024. Source: Liga TDP
(Q) Qualified for the phase indicated

== Group 7 ==
Group with 11 teams from Guerrero, Mexico City and Morelos.

=== Teams ===
Location of teams in the 2023–24 Liga TDP Group 7 (Mexico City)
Location of teams in the 2023–24 Liga TDP Group 7 (Morelos)
Location of teams in the 2023–24 Liga TDP Group 7 (Guerrero)

| Team | City | Home ground | Capacity | Affiliate | Official name |
|---|---|---|---|---|---|
| Academia Cuextlán | Iztacalco, Mexico City | Deportivo Leandro Valle | 1,000 | Juárez | – |
| Águilas UAGro | Chilpancingo, Guerrero | UAGro | 2,000 | – | – |
| Arroceros Jojutla | Jojutla, Morelos | Unidad Deportiva La Perseverancia | 1,000 | – | Académicos Jojutla |
| Atlético Real Morelos | Xochitepec, Morelos | La Escuelita | 1,000 | – | Santiago Tulantepec |
| Calentanos | Ciudad Altamirano, Guerrero | Campo Pungarabato | 1,000 | – | Iguanas |
| Caudillos Zapata | Emiliano Zapata, Morelos | General Emiliano Zapata | 2,000 | – | Caudillos de Morelos |
| Iguala | Iguala, Guerrero | Unidad Deportiva Iguala | 4,000 | – | – |
| Selva Cañera | Tlaquiltenango, Morelos | Unidad Deportiva Roberto "Monito" Rodríguez | 1,000 | – | – |
| Tigres Yautepec | Yautepec, Morelos | Unidad Deportiva San Carlos | 1,500 | – | Atlético Cuernavaca |
| Tlapa | Tlapa de Comonfort, Guerrero | Cancha Los Rivera | 1,000 | – | – |
| Yautepec | Yautepec, Morelos | Centro Deportivo Yautepec | 3,000 | – | – |

=== League table ===
| Pos | Team | Pld | W | D | L | GF | GA | GD | BP | Pts | Qualification or relegation |
|---|---|---|---|---|---|---|---|---|---|---|---|
| 1 | Yautepec (Q) | 20 | 13 | 5 | 2 | 51 | 15 | +36 | 3 | 47 | Advance to Liguilla de Ascenso |
| 2 | Caudillos Zapata (Q) | 20 | 13 | 5 | 2 | 33 | 10 | +23 | 2 | 46 | Advance to Liguilla de Ascenso |
| 3 | Tigres Yautepec (Q) | 20 | 13 | 4 | 3 | 41 | 15 | +26 | 2 | 45 | Advance to Liguilla de Ascenso |
| 4 | Águilas UAGro | 20 | 13 | 3 | 4 | 53 | 18 | +35 | 1 | 43 | |
| 5 | Selva Cañera | 20 | 9 | 3 | 8 | 26 | 20 | +6 | 2 | 32 | |
| 6 | Academia Cuextlán | 20 | 8 | 3 | 9 | 30 | 38 | −8 | 1 | 28 | |
| 7 | Arroceros Jojutla | 20 | 5 | 3 | 12 | 17 | 37 | −20 | 2 | 20 | |
| 8 | Calentanos | 20 | 6 | 2 | 12 | 12 | 42 | −30 | 0 | 20 | |
| 9 | Tlapa | 20 | 5 | 2 | 13 | 18 | 35 | −17 | 2 | 19 | |
| 10 | Atlético Real Morelos | 20 | 3 | 5 | 12 | 20 | 36 | −16 | 1 | 15 | |
| 11 | Iguala | 20 | 3 | 3 | 14 | 8 | 43 | −35 | 3 | 15 | |

Updated to match(es) played on 20 April 2024. Source: Liga TDP
(Q) Qualified for the phase indicated

== Group 8 ==
Group with 12 teams from Hidalgo and State of Mexico.

=== Teams ===
Location of teams in the 2023–24 Liga TDP Group 8 (Hidalgo and Puebla)
Location of teams in the 2023–24 Liga TDP Group 8 (State of Mexico)

| Team | City | Home ground | Capacity | Affiliate | Official name |
|---|---|---|---|---|---|
| Águilas de Teotitihuacán | San Martín de las Pirámides, State of Mexico | Deportivo Braulio Romero | 1,000 | – | – |
| Atlético Toltecas | Tula, Hidalgo | Parque Infantil La Tortuga | 1,000 | – | – |
| Atlético Tulancingo | Tulancingo, Hidalgo | Primero de Mayo | 2,500 | – | – |
| Bombarderos de Tecámac | Tecámac, State of Mexico | Deportivo Sierra Hermosa | 1,000 | – | – |
| Faraones de Texcoco | Texcoco, State of Mexico | Claudio Suárez | 4,000 | – | – |
| Halcones Negros | Chicoloapan de Juárez, State of Mexico | Unidad Deportiva San José | 1,000 | – | – |
| Hidalguense | Pachuca, Hidalgo | Club Hidalguense | 600 | – | – |
| Lilo | Naucalpan, State of Mexico | Colegio Alemán Campus Norte | 500 | – | Matamoros |
| Pachuca | San Agustín Tlaxiaca, Hidalgo | Universidad del Fútbol | 1,000 | Pachuca | – |
| Sk Sport | Tulancingo, Hidalgo | Primero de Mayo | 2,500 | – | – |
| Tuzos Pachuca | San Agustín Tlaxiaca, Hidalgo | Universidad del Fútbol | 1,000 | Pachuca | – |
| Unión Astros | Papalotla, State of Mexico | IMCUFIDE Papalotla | 1,000 | – | Histeria |

=== League table ===
| Pos | Team | Pld | W | D | L | GF | GA | GD | BP | Pts | Qualification or relegation |
|---|---|---|---|---|---|---|---|---|---|---|---|
| 1 | Faraones de Texcoco (Q) | 22 | 16 | 3 | 3 | 55 | 18 | +37 | 3 | 54 | Advance to Liguilla de Ascenso |
| 2 | Sk Sport (Q) | 22 | 15 | 3 | 4 | 63 | 25 | +38 | 3 | 51 | Advance to Liguilla de Ascenso |
| 3 | Tuzos Pachuca (Q) | 22 | 13 | 4 | 5 | 57 | 25 | +32 | 2 | 45 | Advance to Liguilla de Ascenso |
| 4 | Atlético Tulancingo | 22 | 14 | 2 | 6 | 45 | 26 | +19 | 1 | 45 | |
| 5 | Halcones Negros | 22 | 10 | 7 | 5 | 54 | 36 | +18 | 2 | 39 | |
| 6 | Pachuca | 22 | 9 | 8 | 5 | 52 | 23 | +29 | 2 | 37 | |
| 7 | Atlético Toltecas | 22 | 10 | 1 | 11 | 36 | 42 | −6 | 1 | 32 | |
| 8 | Bombarderos de Tecámac | 22 | 6 | 8 | 8 | 27 | 30 | −3 | 5 | 31 | |
| 9 | Hidalguense | 22 | 6 | 5 | 11 | 31 | 38 | −7 | 2 | 25 | |
| 10 | Unión Astros | 22 | 4 | 3 | 15 | 19 | 63 | −44 | 2 | 17 | |
| 11 | Lilo | 22 | 4 | 1 | 17 | 24 | 83 | −59 | 0 | 13 | |
| 12 | Águilas de Teotihuacán | 22 | 1 | 3 | 18 | 20 | 74 | −54 | 1 | 7 | |

Updated to match(es) played on 20 April 2024. Source: Liga TDP
(Q) Qualified for the phase indicated

== Group 9 ==
Group with 10 teams from Hidalgo, San Luis Potosí and Veracruz.

=== Teams ===
Location of teams in the 2023–24 Liga TDP Group 9 (Hidalgo, Tampico and Veracruz)
Location of teams in the 2023–24 Liga TDP Group 9 (SLP)

| Team | City | Home ground | Capacity | Affiliate | Official Name |
|---|---|---|---|---|---|
| Atlético Boca del Río | Veracruz City, Veracruz | Instituto Tecnológico de Veracruz | 1,000 | – | – |
| Atlético Poza Rica | Poza Rica, Veracruz | 18 de Marzo | 2,000 | – | Castores Gobrantacto |
| Garzas Blancas | Axtla de Terrazas, San Luis Potosí | Garzas Blancas | 1,500 | – | Bucaneros de Matamoros |
| Huastecos Axtla | Axtla de Terrazas, San Luis Potosí | Garzas Blancas | 1,500 | – | Guerreros Reynosa |
| Orgullo Surtam | Tampico, Tamaulipas | Tamaulipas | 19,667 | – | – |
| Sultanes de Tamazunchale | Tamazunchale, San Luis Potosí | Unidad Deportiva Tamazunchale | 2,000 | – | – |
| Tantoyuca | Tantoyuca, Veracruz | Campo ADA | 1,000 | – | – |
| Tierra Blanca | Tierra Blanca, Veracruz | La Masa | 1,000 | – | Papanes de Papantla |
| Venados de Misantla | Misantla, Veracruz | Unidad Deportiva El Zotoluco | 1,000 | – | – |

=== League table ===
| Pos | Team | Pld | W | D | L | GF | GA | GD | BP | Pts | Qualification or relegation |
|---|---|---|---|---|---|---|---|---|---|---|---|
| 1 | Orgullo Surtam (Q) | 26 | 21 | 4 | 1 | 66 | 15 | +51 | 2 | 69 | Advance to Liguilla de Ascenso |
| 2 | Garzas Blancas (Q) | 26 | 21 | 3 | 2 | 57 | 23 | +34 | 2 | 68 | Advance to Liguilla de Ascenso |
| 3 | Venados de Misantla (Q) | 26 | 15 | 4 | 7 | 43 | 22 | +21 | 1 | 50 | Advance to Liguilla de Ascenso |
| 4 | Sultanes de Tamazunchale (Q) | 26 | 15 | 2 | 9 | 47 | 35 | +12 | 1 | 48 | Advance to Liguilla de Ascenso |
| 5 | Atlético Poza Rica | 26 | 10 | 4 | 12 | 38 | 46 | −8 | 2 | 36 | |
| 6 | Tantoyuca | 25 | 9 | 3 | 13 | 27 | 39 | −12 | 2 | 32 | |
| 7 | Tierra Blanca | 26 | 7 | 6 | 13 | 41 | 59 | −18 | 4 | 31 | |
| 8 | Atlético Boca del Río | 26 | 7 | 1 | 18 | 21 | 68 | −47 | 0 | 22 | |
| 9 | Huastecos Axtla | 23 | 4 | 1 | 18 | 14 | 33 | −19 | 0 | 13 | |

Updated to match(es) played on 20 April 2024. Source: Liga TDP
(Q) Qualified for the phase indicated

== Group 10 ==
Group with 15 teams from Guanajuato and Querétaro.

Location of teams in the 2023–24 Liga TDP Group 10 (Guanajuato)
Location of teams in the 2023–24 Liga TDP Group 10 (Querétaro)

=== Teams ===
| Team | City | Home ground | Capacity | Affiliate | Official name |
|---|---|---|---|---|---|
| Celaya | Celaya, Guanajuato | Miguel Alemán Valdés | 23,182 | Celaya | – |
| Celaya Linces | Celaya, Guanajuato | Insituto Tecnológico de Celaya | 1,000 | – | – |
| Delegon Cadereyta | Cadereyta de Montes, Querétaro | Unidad Deportiva Cadereyta | 1,200 | – | Cañada CTM |
| Estudiantes de Querétaro | Querétaro, Querétaro | Casa de la Juventud INDEREQ | 1,000 | – | – |
| Fundadores El Marqués | Santa Rosa, Querétaro | Parque Bicentenario | 2,000 | – | – |
| Inter de Querétaro | Cadereyta de Montes, Querétaro | Unidad Deportiva Cadereyta | 1,200 | Inter de Querétaro | – |
| Inter Guanajuato | Guanajuato City, Guanajuato | Arnulfo Vázquez Nieto | 1,000 | Inter de Querétaro | – |
| Inter Corregidora | Querétaro, Querétaro | Unidad Deportiva Reforma Lomas | 1,000 | Inter de Querétaro | Querétaro 3D |
| Leyenda Chino Estrada | Guanajuato City, Guanajuato | Nieto Piña UG | 1,000 | – | Mayas Hunucmá |
| Lobos ITECA | San Luis de la Paz, Guanajuato | El Internado | 1,500 | – | – |
| Mineros Querétaro | Colón, Querétaro | Universidad CEICKOR | 500 | Mineros de Zacatecas | – |
| Oro La Piedad Querétaro | Querétaro, Querétaro | El Infiernillo | 1,000 | – | – |
| San Juan del Río | San Juan del Río, Querétaro | Unidad Deportiva Norte | 1,000 | – | – |
| San Miguel Internacional | San Miguel de Allende, Guanajuato | José María 'Capi' Correa | 4,000 | – | – |
| Titanes de Querétaro | Santa Rosa, Querétaro | Universidad Politécnica de Santa Rosa | 500 | – | – |

=== League table ===
| Pos | Team | Pld | W | D | L | GF | GA | GD | BP | Pts | Qualification or relegation |
|---|---|---|---|---|---|---|---|---|---|---|---|
| 1 | Titanes de Querétaro (Q) | 28 | 18 | 7 | 3 | 53 | 20 | +33 | 4 | 65 | Advance to Liguilla de Ascenso |
| 2 | Mineros Querétaro (Q) | 28 | 15 | 10 | 3 | 75 | 28 | +47 | 6 | 61 | Advance to Liguilla de Filiales |
| 3 | Celaya Linces (Q) | 28 | 16 | 6 | 6 | 49 | 30 | +19 | 3 | 57 | Advance to Liguilla de Ascenso |
| 4 | Oro La Piedad Querétaro (Q) | 28 | 16 | 6 | 6 | 60 | 35 | +25 | 2 | 56 | Advance to Liguilla de Ascenso |
| 5 | Inter de Querétaro (Q) | 28 | 14 | 8 | 6 | 66 | 28 | +38 | 5 | 55 | Advance to Liguilla de Filiales |
| 6 | Estudiantes de Querétaro (Q) | 28 | 16 | 4 | 8 | 58 | 31 | +27 | 3 | 55 | Advance to Liguilla de Ascenso |
| 7 | Celaya (Q) | 28 | 15 | 6 | 7 | 87 | 37 | +50 | 3 | 54 | Advance to Liguilla de Filiales |
| 8 | Lobos ITECA | 28 | 12 | 5 | 11 | 54 | 52 | +2 | 2 | 43 | |
| 9 | Fundadores El Marqués | 28 | 9 | 8 | 11 | 50 | 46 | +4 | 4 | 39 | |
| 10 | San Juan del Río | 28 | 9 | 5 | 14 | 29 | 54 | −25 | 4 | 36 | |
| 11 | San Miguel Internacional | 28 | 7 | 5 | 16 | 25 | 58 | −33 | 1 | 27 | |
| 12 | Leyenda Chino Estrada | 28 | 4 | 10 | 14 | 25 | 62 | −37 | 4 | 26 | |
| 13 | Inter Corregidora | 28 | 4 | 8 | 16 | 19 | 51 | −32 | 4 | 24 | |
| 14 | Inter Guanajuato | 28 | 5 | 5 | 18 | 21 | 62 | −41 | 0 | 20 | |
| 15 | Delegon Cadereyta | 28 | 3 | 1 | 24 | 17 | 94 | −77 | 0 | 10 | |

Updated to match(es) played on 20 April 2024. Source: Liga TDP
(Q) Qualified for the phase indicated

== Group 11 ==
Group with 8 teams from Michoacán.

=== Teams ===
Location of teams in the 2023–24 Liga TDP Group 11

| Team | City | Home ground | Capacity | Affiliate | Official name |
|---|---|---|---|---|---|
| Atlético Valladolid | Morelia, Michoacán | Complejo Deportivo Bicentenario | 1,000 | – | – |
| Bucaneros | Maravatío, Michoacán | Unidad Deportiva Melchor Ocampo | 1,000 | – | – |
| Deportivo Zamora | Zamora, Michoacán | Unidad Deportiva El Chamizal | 5,000 | – | Atlético Chavinda |
| Furia Azul | Pátzcuaro, Michoacán | Furia Azul | 3,000 | – | – |
| H2O Purépechas | Morelia, Michoacán | Cancha Anexa Estadio Morelos | 2,000 | Atlético Morelia | – |
| Halcones AFU | Uruapan, Michoacán | Unidad Deportiva Hermanos López Rayón | 6,000 | Halcones de Zapopan | Halcones de Zapopan |
| Huetamo | Huetamo, Michoacán | Unidad Deportiva Simón Bolívar | 1,000 | La Piedad | Degollado |
| La Piedad Imperial | La Piedad, Michoacán | Juan N. López | 13,356 | – | – |

=== League table ===
| Pos | Team | Pld | W | D | L | GF | GA | GD | BP | Pts | Qualification or relegation |
|---|---|---|---|---|---|---|---|---|---|---|---|
| 1 | Deportivo Zamora (Q) | 21 | 16 | 2 | 3 | 65 | 16 | +49 | 1 | 51 | Advance to Liguilla de Ascenso |
| 2 | H2O Purépechas (Q) | 21 | 12 | 5 | 4 | 49 | 25 | +24 | 4 | 45 | Advance to Liguilla de Ascenso |
| 3 | Bucaneros (Q) | 21 | 13 | 3 | 5 | 66 | 28 | +38 | 1 | 43 | Advance to Liguilla de Ascenso |
| 4 | Halcones AFU | 21 | 10 | 5 | 6 | 46 | 27 | +19 | 3 | 38 | |
| 5 | La Piedad Imperial | 21 | 10 | 3 | 8 | 29 | 32 | −3 | 1 | 34 | |
| 6 | Huetamo | 21 | 6 | 3 | 12 | 27 | 55 | −28 | 1 | 22 | |
| 7 | Furia Azul | 21 | 1 | 6 | 14 | 18 | 47 | −29 | 3 | 12 | |
| 8 | Atlético Valladolid | 21 | 1 | 3 | 17 | 15 | 85 | −70 | 1 | 7 | |

Updated to match(es) played on 20 April 2024. Source: Liga TDP
(Q) Qualified for the phase indicated

== Group 12 ==
Group with 14 teams from Aguascalientes, Durango, Guanajuato, Jalisco, San Luis Potosí and Zacatecas.

=== Teams ===
Location of teams in the 2023–24 Liga TDP Group 12 (Guanajuato and Jalisco)
Location of teams in the 2023–24 Liga TDP Group 12 (Aguascalientes and Zacatecas)
Location of teams in the 2023–24 Liga TDP Group 12 (Durango and SLP)

| Team | City | Home ground | Capacity | Affiliate | Official name |
|---|---|---|---|---|---|
| Atlético ECCA | León, Guanajuato | CODE Las Joyas | 1,000 | – | – |
| Atlético Leonés | León, Guanajuato | Unidad Deportiva Enrique Fernández Martínez | 2,000 | – | – |
| Cachorros de León | León, Guanajuato | Instituto Oviedo Naútico | 500 | – | Fut-Car |
| Delfines de Abasolo | Abasolo, Guanajuato | Municipal de Abasolo | 2,500 | – | – |
| Empresarios del Rincón | Purísima del Rincón, Guanajuato | Unidad Deportiva de Purísima | 1,000 | – | Real Olmeca Sport |
| León GEN | Lagos de Moreno, Jalisco | Complejo Deportivo GEN | 2,000 | León | – |
| Jaime Correa | Durango City, Durango | CAR Durango | 500 | Escorpiones | Escorpiones |
| Mineros de Zacatecas | Zacatecas, Zacatecas | Unidad Deportiva Guadalupe | 1,000 | Mineros de Zacatecas | – |
| Necaxa | Aguascalientes, Aguascalientes | Victoria | 23,000 | Necaxa | – |
| Pabellón | Aguascalientes, Aguascalientes | Ferrocarrilero | 2,000 | – | – |
| Potosinos | San Luis Potosí, San Luis Potosí | Unidad Deportiva Adolfo López Mateos | 1,000 | – | FC Zacatecas |
| Santa Ana del Conde | Santa Ana del Conde, Guanajuato | El Roble | 500 | – | Real Magari |
| Suré | León, Guanajuato | CODE Las Joyas | 1,000 | – | – |
| Tuzos UAZ | Zacatecas, Zacatecas | Universitario Unidad Deportiva Norte | 5,000 | Tuzos UAZ | – |

=== League table ===
| Pos | Team | Pld | W | D | L | GF | GA | GD | BP | Pts | Qualification or relegation |
|---|---|---|---|---|---|---|---|---|---|---|---|
| 1 | Delfines de Abasolo (Q) | 26 | 18 | 5 | 3 | 56 | 21 | +35 | 4 | 63 | Advance to Liguilla de Ascenso |
| 2 | Necaxa (Q) | 26 | 16 | 6 | 4 | 54 | 21 | +33 | 3 | 57 | Advance to Liguilla de Filiales |
| 3 | Potosinos (Q) | 26 | 16 | 5 | 5 | 59 | 27 | +32 | 3 | 56 | Advance to Liguilla de Ascenso |
| 4 | Atlético Leonés (Q) | 26 | 16 | 4 | 6 | 52 | 23 | +29 | 3 | 55 | Advance to Liguilla de Ascenso |
| 5 | Tuzos UAZ (Q) | 26 | 14 | 5 | 7 | 48 | 27 | +21 | 3 | 50 | Advance to Liguilla de Ascenso |
| 6 | Mineros de Zacatecas | 26 | 12 | 7 | 7 | 45 | 34 | +11 | 4 | 47 | |
| 7 | Cachorros de León | 26 | 13 | 7 | 6 | 46 | 35 | +11 | 0 | 46 | |
| 8 | Suré | 26 | 10 | 7 | 9 | 36 | 31 | +5 | 4 | 41 | |
| 9 | Empresarios del Rincón | 26 | 8 | 6 | 12 | 35 | 40 | −5 | 3 | 33 | |
| 10 | Pabellón | 26 | 9 | 2 | 15 | 40 | 57 | −17 | 1 | 30 | |
| 11 | Santa Ana del Conde | 26 | 7 | 1 | 18 | 22 | 80 | −58 | 1 | 23 | |
| 12 | León GEN | 26 | 6 | 2 | 18 | 28 | 66 | −38 | 0 | 20 | |
| 13 | Atlético ECCA | 26 | 4 | 4 | 18 | 31 | 58 | −27 | 2 | 18 | |
| 14 | Jaime Correa | 26 | 2 | 1 | 23 | 6 | 38 | −32 | 0 | 7 | |

Updated to match(es) played on 20 April 2024. Source: Liga TDP
(Q) Qualified for the phase indicated

== Group 13 ==
Group with 14 teams from Jalisco.

=== Teams ===
Location of teams in the 2023–24 Liga TDP Group 13

| Team | City | Home ground | Capacity | Affiliate | Official name |
|---|---|---|---|---|---|
| Acatlán | Zapotlanejo, Jalisco | Miguel Hidalgo | 1,700 | – | – |
| Agaveros | Tlajomulco de Zúñiga, Jalisco | Deportivo del Valle | 1,000 | – | – |
| Alteños Acatic | Acatic, Jalisco | Unidad Deportiva Acatic | 1,000 | Tepatitlán | – |
| Aves Blancas | Tepatitlán de Morelos, Jalisco | Corredor Industrial | 1,200 | – | – |
| Caja Oblatos – Furia Roja | Jesús María, Jalisco | Ramírez Nogales | 600 | Caja Oblatos | – |
| Gorilas de Juanacatlán | Juanacatlán, Jalisco | Club Juanacatlán | 500 | – | – |
| Nacional | Zapopan, Jalisco | Club Deportivo Imperio | 1,500 | – | – |
| Pro Camp | Guadalajara, Jalisco | Club San Rafael | 1,000 | – | – |
| Salamanca | Yahualica, Jalisco | Las Ánimas | 8,500 | Salamanca CF UDS | – |
| Tapatíos Soccer | Tlaquepaque, Jalisco | Club CAREF CFC | 500 | – | – |
| Tecos | Zapopan, Jalisco | Cancha Anexa Tres de Marzo | 1,000 | Tecos | – |
| Tepatitlán | Tepatitlán de Morelos, Jalisco | Gregorio "Tepa" Gómez | 8,085 | Tepatitlán | – |
| Tornados Tlaquepaque | Tlaquepaque, Jalisco | Club Maracaná | 500 | – | Caja Oblatos |

=== League table ===
| Pos | Team | Pld | W | D | L | GF | GA | GD | BP | Pts | Qualification or relegation |
|---|---|---|---|---|---|---|---|---|---|---|---|
| 1 | Gorilas de Juanacatlán (Q) | 26 | 20 | 3 | 3 | 64 | 20 | +44 | 1 | 64 | Advance to Liguilla de Ascenso |
| 2 | Acatlán (Q) | 26 | 19 | 4 | 3 | 61 | 23 | +38 | 3 | 64 | Advance to Liguilla de Ascenso |
| 3 | Leones Negros UdeG (Q) | 26 | 16 | 6 | 4 | 48 | 26 | +22 | 4 | 58 | Advance to Liguilla de Filiales |
| 4 | Tapatíos Soccer (Q) | 26 | 14 | 6 | 6 | 51 | 30 | +21 | 2 | 50 | Advance to Liguilla de Ascenso |
| 5 | Aves Blancas (Q) | 26 | 12 | 7 | 7 | 48 | 28 | +20 | 4 | 47 | Advance to Liguilla de Ascenso |
| 6 | Tepatitlán | 26 | 12 | 6 | 8 | 34 | 25 | +9 | 1 | 43 | |
| 7 | Tecos | 26 | 11 | 4 | 11 | 33 | 41 | −8 | 4 | 41 | |
| 8 | Pro Camp | 26 | 9 | 6 | 11 | 30 | 34 | −4 | 5 | 38 | |
| 9 | Tornados Tlaquepaque | 26 | 10 | 4 | 12 | 28 | 30 | −2 | 1 | 35 | |
| 10 | Alteños Acatic | 26 | 5 | 10 | 11 | 27 | 37 | −10 | 5 | 30 | |
| 11 | Salamanca | 26 | 9 | 2 | 15 | 43 | 64 | −21 | 1 | 30 | |
| 12 | Nacional | 26 | 5 | 5 | 16 | 18 | 41 | −23 | 1 | 21 | |
| 13 | Caja Oblatos – Furia Roja | 26 | 4 | 1 | 21 | 32 | 68 | −36 | 0 | 13 | |
| 14 | Agaveros | 26 | 3 | 2 | 21 | 17 | 67 | −50 | 1 | 12 | |

Updated to match(es) played on 20 April 2024. Source: Liga TDP
(Q) Qualified for the phase indicated

== Group 14 ==
Group with 13 teams from Jalisco.

=== Teams ===
Location of teams in the 2023–24 Liga TDP Group 14

| Team | City | Home ground | Capacity | Affiliate | Official name |
|---|---|---|---|---|---|
| Alfareros de Tonalá | Tonalá, Jalisco | Unidad Deportiva Revolución Mexicana | 3,000 | – | – |
| Aviña | Zapopan, Jalisco | Club Deportivo Aviña | 1,000 | – | – |
| Catedráticos Elite | Etzatlán, Jalisco | Unidad Deportiva Etzatlán | 1,000 | Petroleros de Salamanca | – |
| Charales de Chapala | Chapala, Jalisco | Municipal Juan Rayo | 1,200 | – | – |
| Deportivo Tala | Tala, Jalisco | Centro Deportivo Cultural 24 de Marzo | 2,000 | – | Volcanes de Colima |
| Diablos Tesistán | Zapopan, Jalisco | Club Diablos Tesistán | 1,000 | – | – |
| Eibar Mexiko | Zapopan, Jalisco | Club Pumas Tesistán | 1,000 | – | Deportivo Cimagol |
| Elite Azteca | Zapopan, Jalisco | Club Deportivo Aviña | 1,000 | – | AFAR Manzanillo |
| Fénix CFAR | San Isidro Mazatepec, Jalisco | La Fortaleza | 1,000 | – | – |
| Gallos Viejos | Zapopan, Jalisco | Club Pumas Tesistán | 1,000 | – | – |
| Guerreros de Autlán | Autlán, Jalisco | Unidad Deportiva Chapultepec | 1,500 | – | – |
| Oro | Ciudad Guzmán, Jalisco | Municipal Santa Rosa | 4,000 | – | – |
| Real Ánimas de Sayula | Sayula, Jalisco | Gustavo Díaz Ordaz | 4,000 | – | – |

=== League table ===
| Pos | Team | Pld | W | D | L | GF | GA | GD | BP | Pts | Qualification or relegation |
|---|---|---|---|---|---|---|---|---|---|---|---|
| 1 | Diablos Tesistán (Q) | 24 | 19 | 2 | 3 | 67 | 19 | +48 | 2 | 61 | Advance to Liguilla de Ascenso |
| 2 | Guerreros de Autlán (Q) | 24 | 20 | 0 | 4 | 63 | 20 | +43 | 0 | 60 | Advance to Liguilla de Ascenso |
| 3 | Deportivo Tala (Q) | 24 | 15 | 4 | 5 | 64 | 29 | +35 | 3 | 52 | Advance to Liguilla de Ascenso |
| 4 | Aviña (Q) | 24 | 14 | 4 | 6 | 57 | 23 | +34 | 2 | 48 | Advance to Liguilla de Ascenso |
| 5 | Charales de Chapala | 24 | 13 | 6 | 5 | 39 | 25 | +14 | 3 | 48 | |
| 6 | Alfareros de Tonalá | 24 | 9 | 5 | 10 | 33 | 29 | +4 | 2 | 34 | |
| 7 | Elite Azteca | 24 | 8 | 6 | 10 | 23 | 31 | −8 | 4 | 34 | |
| 8 | Real Ánimas de Sayula | 24 | 11 | 1 | 12 | 42 | 53 | −11 | 0 | 34 | |
| 9 | Catedráticos Elite | 24 | 8 | 5 | 11 | 38 | 39 | −1 | 1 | 30 | |
| 10 | Gallos Viejos | 24 | 8 | 2 | 14 | 29 | 35 | −6 | 2 | 28 | |
| 11 | Fénix CFAR | 24 | 4 | 3 | 17 | 23 | 57 | −34 | 2 | 17 | |
| 12 | Oro | 24 | 5 | 1 | 18 | 23 | 68 | −45 | 0 | 16 | |
| 13 | Eibar Mexiko | 24 | 1 | 3 | 20 | 15 | 88 | −73 | 0 | 6 | |

Updated to match(es) played on 20 April 2024. Source: Liga TDP
(Q) Qualified for the phase indicated

== Group 15 ==
Group with 10 teams from Jalisco, Nayarit and Sinaloa.

=== Teams ===
Location of teams in the 2023–24 Liga TDP Group 15 (Jalisco and Nayarit)
Location of teams in the 2023–24 Liga TDP Group 15 (Sinaloa)

| Team | City | Home ground | Capacity | Affiliate | Official name |
|---|---|---|---|---|---|
| Atlético Acaponeta | Acaponeta, Nayarit | Unidad Deportiva Acaponeta | 1,000 | – | – |
| Coras | Tepic, Nayarit | Hilario "Diablo" Díaz | 1,000 | Coras | – |
| Dorados de Sinaloa | Culiacán, Sinaloa | Unidad Deportiva SAGARPA | 2,000 | Dorados de Sinaloa | – |
| FuraMochis | Los Mochis, Sinaloa | Club FuraMochis | 1,000 | – | – |
| Halcones de Nayarit | Tepic, Nayarit | Halcones | 1,000 | – | – |
| Legado del Centenario | Guadalajara, Jalisco | Unidad Deportiva Cuauhtémoc | 1,000 | – | – |
| Moncaro | Amatitán, Jalisco | 5 de Mayo | 1,000 | – | – |
| Puerto Vallarta | Puerto Vallarta, Jalisco | Ejidal La Preciosa | 2,000 | – | – |
| Tigres de Alica | Tepic, Nayarit | Unidad Deportiva Juanelo | 1,000 | – | – |
| Xalisco | Xalisco, Nayarit | Unidad Deportiva Landareñas | 1,500 | – | – |

=== League table ===
| Pos | Team | Pld | W | D | L | GF | GA | GD | BP | Pts | Qualification or relegation |
|---|---|---|---|---|---|---|---|---|---|---|---|
| 1 | Tigres de Alica (Q) | 27 | 22 | 3 | 2 | 56 | 16 | +40 | 1 | 70 | Advance to Liguilla de Ascenso |
| 2 | Xalisco (Q) | 27 | 17 | 4 | 6 | 52 | 21 | +31 | 2 | 57 | Advance to Liguilla de Ascenso |
| 3 | Dorados de Sinaloa (Q) | 27 | 16 | 6 | 5 | 62 | 33 | +29 | 3 | 57 | Advance to Liguilla de Filiales |
| 4 | FuraMochis (Q) | 27 | 15 | 7 | 5 | 54 | 29 | +25 | 3 | 55 | Advance to Liguilla de Filiales |
| 5 | Legado del Centenario | 27 | 13 | 7 | 7 | 55 | 35 | +20 | 6 | 52 | |
| 6 | Halcones de Nayarit | 27 | 9 | 6 | 12 | 35 | 35 | 0 | 2 | 35 | |
| 7 | Atlético Acaponeta | 27 | 8 | 4 | 15 | 43 | 65 | −22 | 4 | 32 | |
| 8 | Puerto Vallarta | 27 | 4 | 5 | 18 | 25 | 67 | −42 | 2 | 19 | |
| 9 | Coras | 27 | 4 | 3 | 20 | 18 | 63 | −45 | 1 | 16 | |
| 10 | Moncaro | 27 | 3 | 3 | 21 | 26 | 62 | −36 | 0 | 12 | |

Updated to match(es) played on 20 April 2024. Source: Liga TDP
(Q) Qualified for the phase indicated

== Group 16 ==
Group with 13 teams from Coahuila, Durango, Nuevo León and Tamaulipas.

=== Teams ===
Location of teams in the 2023–24 Liga TDP Group 16 (Nuevo León)
Location of teams in the 2023–24 Liga TDP Group 16 (Coahuila and Durango)
Location of teams in the 2023–24 Liga TDP Group 16 (Tamaulipas)

| Team | City | Home ground | Capacity | Affiliate | Official name |
|---|---|---|---|---|---|
| Cadereyta | Cadereyta, Nuevo León | Clemente Salinas Netro | 1,000 | – | – |
| Calor Torreón | Gómez Palacio, Durango | Unidad Deportiva Francisco Gómez Palacio | 4,000 | Calor | – |
| Correcaminos UAT | Ciudad Victoria, Tamaulipas | Profesor Eugenio Alvizo Porras | 5,000 | Correcaminos UAT | – |
| Escobedo | General Escobedo, Nuevo León | Deportivo Lázaro Cárdenas | 1,000 | – | Real San Cosme |
| Gallos Nuevo León | Monterrey, Nuevo León | Nuevo León Independiente | 1,000 | – | – |
| Gavilanes de Matamoros | Matamoros, Tamaulipas | El Hogar | 22,000 | Gavilanes de Matamoros | Ho Gar H. Matamoros |
| Halcones de Saltillo | Saltillo, Coahuila | Olímpico Francisco I. Madero | 7,000 | – | San Isidro Laguna |
| Irritilas | San Pedro, Coahuila | Quinta Ximena | 1,000 | – | – |
| Nuevo León | San Nicolás de los Garza, Nuevo León | Unidad Deportiva Oriente | 1,000 | – | – |
| Saltillo Soccer | Saltillo, Coahuila | Olímpico Francisco I. Madero | 7,000 | Saltillo | – |
| San Pedro 7–10 | San Pedro Garza García, Nuevo León | Sporti Valle Poniente | 500 | – | – |
| Santiago | Santiago, Nuevo León | FCD El Barrial | 1,300 | Santiago | – |
| Tigres SD | General Zuazua, Nuevo León | Instalaciones de Zuazua | 800 | Tigres UANL | – |

=== League table ===
| Pos | Team | Pld | W | D | L | GF | GA | GD | BP | Pts | Qualification or relegation |
|---|---|---|---|---|---|---|---|---|---|---|---|
| 1 | Cadereyta (Q) | 24 | 17 | 5 | 2 | 60 | 12 | +48 | 2 | 58 | Advance to Liguilla de Ascenso |
| 2 | Gavilanes de Matamoros (Q) | 24 | 15 | 4 | 5 | 47 | 25 | +22 | 3 | 52 | Advance to Liguilla de Ascenso |
| 3 | Santiago (Q) | 24 | 12 | 8 | 4 | 41 | 26 | +15 | 6 | 50 | Advance to Liguilla de Ascenso |
| 4 | Saltillo Soccer (Q) | 24 | 14 | 4 | 6 | 38 | 23 | +15 | 4 | 50 | Advance to Liguilla de Ascenso |
| 5 | Irritilas | 24 | 12 | 7 | 5 | 47 | 26 | +21 | 2 | 45 | |
| 6 | Tigres SD | 24 | 10 | 5 | 9 | 28 | 26 | +2 | 4 | 39 | |
| 7 | Correcaminos UAT | 24 | 8 | 10 | 6 | 32 | 29 | +3 | 3 | 37 | |
| 8 | Calor Torreón | 24 | 8 | 5 | 11 | 30 | 33 | −3 | 2 | 31 | |
| 9 | Halcones de Saltillo | 24 | 7 | 4 | 13 | 34 | 49 | −15 | 1 | 26 | |
| 10 | San Pedro 7–10 | 24 | 5 | 5 | 14 | 24 | 45 | −21 | 2 | 22 | |
| 11 | Escobedo | 24 | 5 | 5 | 14 | 21 | 43 | −22 | 2 | 22 | |
| 12 | Gallos Nuevo León | 24 | 4 | 4 | 16 | 17 | 47 | −30 | 2 | 18 | |
| 13 | Nuevo León | 24 | 3 | 6 | 15 | 20 | 55 | −35 | 3 | 18 | |

Updated to match(es) played on 20 April 2024. Source: Liga TDP
(Q) Qualified for the phase indicated

== Group 17 ==
Group with 11 teams from Baja California, Chihuahua and Sonora. On February 28, 2024 Chihuahua F.C. left the league due to financial and legal problems.

=== Teams ===
Location of teams in the 2023–24 Liga TDP Group 17

| Team | City | Home ground | Capacity | Affiliate | Official name |
|---|---|---|---|---|---|
| Búhos UNISON | Hermosillo, Sonora | Miguel Castro Servín | 4,000 | – | – |
| Cachanillas | Mexicali, Baja California | Eduardo "Boticas" Pérez | 2,000 | – | – |
| CEPROFFA | Ciudad Juárez, Chihuahua | CEPROFFA | 1,000 | – | – |
| Cimarrones de Sonora | Hermosillo, Sonora | Unidad Deportiva La Milla | 1,000 | Cimarrones de Sonora | – |
| Cobras Fut Premier | Ciudad Juárez, Chihuahua | Complejo Temop Axis | 500 | – | – |
| Etchojoa | Etchojoa, Sonora | Trigueros | 1,500 | – | – |
| La Tribu de Ciudad Juárez | Ciudad Juárez, Chihuahua | Complejo La Tribu | 500 | – | – |
| Obson Dynamo | Ciudad Obregón, Sonora | Hundido ITSON | 3,000 | – | – |
| Tecate | Tecate, Baja California | Unidad Deportiva Eufrasio Santana | 1,000 | – | – |
| Xolos Hermosillo | Hermosillo, Sonora | Cancha Aarón Gamal Aguirre Fimbres | 1,000 | Tijuana | – |

=== League table ===
| Pos | Team | Pld | W | D | L | GF | GA | GD | BP | Pts | Qualification or relegation |
|---|---|---|---|---|---|---|---|---|---|---|---|
| 1 | Cimarrones de Sonora (Q) | 18 | 14 | 4 | 0 | 45 | 13 | +32 | 4 | 50 | Advance to Liguilla de Filiales |
| 2 | La Tribu de Ciudad Juárez (Q) | 18 | 11 | 4 | 3 | 41 | 17 | +24 | 3 | 40 | Advance to Liguilla de Ascenso |
| 3 | Etchojoa (Q) | 18 | 11 | 4 | 3 | 41 | 17 | +24 | 2 | 39 | Advance to Liguilla de Ascenso |
| 4 | Xolos Hermosillo | 18 | 8 | 3 | 7 | 26 | 25 | +1 | 2 | 29 | |
| 5 | Obson Dynamo (Q) | 18 | 7 | 4 | 7 | 20 | 21 | −1 | 2 | 27 | Advance to Liguilla de Ascenso |
| 6 | CEPROFFA | 18 | 6 | 6 | 6 | 19 | 28 | −9 | 3 | 27 | |
| 7 | Búhos UNISON | 18 | 4 | 8 | 6 | 19 | 20 | −1 | 3 | 23 | |
| 8 | Tecate | 18 | 2 | 4 | 12 | 10 | 31 | −21 | 3 | 13 | |
| 9 | Cachanillas | 18 | 3 | 3 | 12 | 18 | 40 | −22 | 1 | 13 | |
| 10 | Cobras Fut Premier | 18 | 2 | 4 | 12 | 18 | 45 | −27 | 0 | 10 | |

Updated to match(es) played on 20 April 2024. Source: Liga TDP
(Q) Qualified for the phase indicated

== Promotion Play–offs ==
The Promotion Play–offs will consist of seven phases. Classify 64 teams, the number varies according to the number of teams in each group, being between three and eight clubs per group. The country will be divided into two zones: South Zone (Groups 1 to 8) and North Zone (Groups 9 to 17). Eliminations will be held according to the average obtained by each team, being ordered from best to worst by their percentage throughout the season.

As of 2020–21 season, the names of the knockout stages were modified as follows: Round of 32, Round of 16, Quarter-finals, Semifinals, Zone Final and Final, this as a consequence of the division of the country into two zones, for so the teams only face clubs from the same region until the final series.

=== Round of 32 ===
The first legs were played on 24 and 25 April, and the second legs were played on 27 and 28 April 2024.

==== South Zone ====
| Team 1 | Agg. | Team 2 | 1st leg | 2nd leg |
|---|---|---|---|---|
| Cordobés | 10–0 | Domínguez Osos | 5–0 | 5–0 |
| Muxes | 3–0 | Independiente Mexiquense | 0–0 | 3–0 |
| Delfines UGM | 2–0 | Cuervos Blancos | 0–0 | 2–0 |
| Faraones de Texcoco | 3–2 | Academia Mineros CDMX | 1–2 | 2–0 |
| Orishas Tepeji | 5–2 | Politécnico | 3–2 | 2–0 |
| Pioneros Junior | 4–2 | Caballeros de Córdoba | 1–2 | 3–0 |
| Dragones de Oaxaca | 5–4 | Lechuzas UPGCH | 2–1 | 3–3 |
| Académicos UGM | 3–3 (4–5) | (p) Tuzos Pachuca | 1–1 | 2–2 |
| Yautepec | 9–6 | Arietes | 2–1 | 7–5 |
| Sk Sport | 6–1 | Héroes de Zaci | 2–1 | 4–0 |
| Inter Playa del Carmen (p) | 2–2 (4–3) | Progreso | 2–2 | 0–0 |
| Águila Azteca | 7–0 | Oceanía | 2–0 | 5–0 |
| Caudillos Zapata | 5–5 (5–6) | (p) Estudiantes de Atlacomulco | 3–4 | 2–1 |
| PDLA | 3–2 | Guerreros DD | 1–2 | 2–0 |
| Córdoba | 2–4 | Estudiantes del COBACH | 1–1 | 1–3 |
| Tigres Yautepec | 2–3 | Cruz Azul Lagunas | 1–1 | 1–2 |

==== North Zone ====
| Team 1 | Agg. | Team 2 | 1st leg | 2nd leg |
|---|---|---|---|---|
| Orgullo Surtam | 2–2 (1–3) | (p) Obson Dynamo | 0–2 | 2–0 |
| Garzas Blancas | 0–3 | Aves Blancas | 0–3 | 0–0 |
| Tigres de Alica | 6–2 | Sultanes de Tamazunchale | 2–2 | 4–0 |
| Diablos Tesistán | 7–1 | Venados de Misantla | 0–1 | 7–0 |
| Guerreros de Autlán (p) | 2–2 (3–2) | Tuzos UAZ | 2–2 | 0–0 |
| Gorilas de Juanacatlán | 3–2 | Tapatíos Soccer | 2–1 | 1–1 |
| Acatlán | 5–1 | Estudiantes de Querétaro | 1–0 | 4–1 |
| Deportivo Zamora | 4–3 | La Piedad Querétaro | 1–2 | 3–1 |
| Delfines de Abasolo | 4–5 | Aviña | 3–4 | 1–1 |
| Cadereyta | 3–2 | Celaya Linces | 3–1 | 0–1 |
| Titanes de Querétaro | 1–3 | Bucaneros | 1–2 | 0–1 |
| La Tribu de Ciudad Juárez | 3–2 | Saltillo Soccer | 0–2 | 3–0 |
| Deportivo Tala | 2–2 (3–4) | (p) Santiago | 1–2 | 1–0 |
| Etchojoa | 2–1 | Xalisco | 0–1 | 2–0 |
| Gavilanes de Matamoros | 0–1 | Atlético Leonés | 0–1 | 0–0 |
| Potosinos | 2–4 | H2O Purépechas | 0–1 | 2–3 |

=== Round of 16 ===
The first legs will be played on 1 and 2 May, and the second legs will be played on 4 and 5 May 2024.

==== South Zone ====
| Team 1 | Agg. | Team 2 | 1st leg | 2nd leg |
|---|---|---|---|---|
| Cordobés | 0–3 | Tuzos Pachuca | 0–3 | 2–0 |
| Muxes | 2–1 | Estudiantes de Atlacomulco | 0–0 | 2–1 |
| Delfines UGM | 1–2 | Estudiantes del COBACH | 0–2 | 1–0 |
| Faraones de Texcoco | 2–0 | Cruz Azul Lagunas | 1–0 | 1–0 |
| Orishas Tepeji | 2–1 | PDLA | 1–1 | 1–0 |
| Pioneros Junior | 4–3 | Águila Azteca | 0–0 | 4–3 |
| Dragones de Oaxaca | 2–1 | Inter Playa del Carmen | 1–1 | 1–0 |
| Yautepec | 3–2 | Sk Sport | 1–2 | 2–0 |

==== North Zone ====
| Team 1 | Agg. | Team 2 | 1st leg | 2nd leg |
|---|---|---|---|---|
| Tigres de Alica | 4–0 | Obson Dynamo | 2–0 | 2–0 |
| Diablos Tesistán | 2–2 (3–4) | (p) Aves Blancas | 2–1 | 0–1 |
| Guerreros de Autlán | 7–3 | Aviña | 2–1 | 5–2 |
| Gorilas de Juanacatlán | 2–0 | Bucaneros | 0–0 | 2–0 |
| Acatlán | 2–0 | Santiago | 0–0 | 2–0 |
| Deportivo Zamora | 1–0 | Atlético Leonés | 0–0 | 1–0 |
| Cadereyta | 2–3 | H2O Purépechas | 0–3 | 2–0 |
| La Tribu de Ciudad Juárez | 0–1 | Etchojoa | 0–0 | 0–1 |

=== Final stage ===
Zone Quarter–finals
2S | Faraones de Texcoco | 1 | 2 | 3
7S | Estudiantes del COBACH | 0 | 0 | 0
4S | Pioneros Junior | 1 | 2 | 3
5S | Dragones de Oaxaca | 2 | 0 | 2
1S | Muxes | 2 | 2 | 4
8S | Tuzos Pachuca | 1 | 1 | 2
3S | Orishas Tepeji | 1 | 3 | 4
6S | Yautepec | 3 | 3 | 6
1N | Tigres de Alica | 2 | 1 | 3
8N | Aves Blancas | 1 | 0 | 1
2N | Guerreros de Autlán | 0 | 2 | 2
7N | H2O Purépechas | 1 | 2 | 3
4N | Acatlán (p) | 0 | 0 | 0 (5)
5N | Deportivo Zamora | 0 | 0 | 0 (4)
3N | Gorilas de Juanacatlán | 0 | 3 | 3
6N | Etchojoa | 2 | 2 | 4

Zone Semi–finals
2S | Faraones de Texcoco | 4 | 0 | 4
4S | Pioneros Junior | 0 | 0 | 0
1S | Muxes | 2 | 0 | 2 (3)
6S | Yautepec (p) | 2 | 0 | 2 (4)
1N | Tigres de Alica | 2 | 2 | 4
7N | H2O Purépechas | 0 | 1 | 1
4N | Acatlán (p) | 1 | 0 | 1 (3)
6N | Etchojoa | 0 | 1 | 1 (0)

Zone Finals
2S | Faraones de Texcoco | 2 | 2 | 4
6S | Yautepec | 0 | 1 | 1
1N | Tigres de Alica | 0 | 1 | 1
4N | Acatlán | 2 | 0 | 2

National Final
2S | Faraones de Texcoco | 3
4N | Acatlán | 1

==== Zone Quarter–finals ====
The first legs were played on 8 and 9 May, and the second legs were played on 11 and 12 May 2024.

| Team 1 | Agg. | Team 2 | 1st leg | 2nd leg |
|---|---|---|---|---|
| Muxes | 4–2 | Tuzos Pachuca | 2–1 | 2–1 |
| Faraones de Texcoco | 3–0 | Estudiantes del COBACH | 1–0 | 2–0 |
| Orishas Tepeji | 4–6 | Yautepec | 1–3 | 3–3 |
| Pioneros Junior | 3–2 | Dragones de Oaxaca | 1–2 | 2–0 |
| Tigres de Alica | 3–1 | Aves Blancas | 2–1 | 1–0 |
| Guerreros de Autlán | 2–3 | H2O Purépechas | 0–1 | 2–2 |
| Gorilas de Juanacatlán | 3–4 | Etchojoa | 0–2 | 3–2 |
| Acatlán (p) | 0–0 (5–4) | Deportivo Zamora | 0–0 | 0–0 |

First leg

| 8 May 2024 | Tuzos Pachuca | 1–2 | Muxes | San Agustín Tlaxiaca, Hidalgo |
| 14:00 CST (UTC−6) | Izquierdo 90' | Report | Velázquez 35'; Trejo 59' | Stadium: Universidad del Fútbol; Attendance: 350; Referee: Mauricio Rodríguez Martínez |

| 8 May 2024 | Estudiantes del COBACH | 0–1 | Faraones de Texcoco | Tuxtla Gutiérrez, Chiapas |
| 15:30 CST (UTC−6) | | Report | Hernández 65' | Stadium: Estadio Víctor Manuel Reyna; Attendance: 2,500; Referee: Yoel Guzmán Hernández |

| 8 May 2024 | Yautepec | 1–3 | Orishas Tepeji | Yautepec, Morelos |
| 18:00 CST (UTC−6) | Meléndez 13', 43'; Mendoza 59' | Report | Noguez 15' | Stadium: Campo Deportivo Yautepec; Attendance: 800; Referee: Alan Eduardo Contreras Sotelo |

| 8 May 2024 | Aves Blancas | 1–2 | Tigres de Alica | Tepatitlán, Jalisco |
| 18:00 CST (UTC−6) | Pérez 23' | Report | Gutiérrez 6'; Gómez 51' | Stadium: Estadio Corredor Industrial; Attendance: 500; Referee: Yitzhak Emmanuel Jacobo Hernández |

| 8 May 2024 | Etchojoa | 2–0 | Gorilas de Juanacatlán | Etchojoa, Sonora |
| 19:00 MST (UTC−7) | Arias 1'; Becerra 54' | Report | | Stadium: Estadio Trigueros; Attendance: 1,473; Referee: Karlo Geovanni Palmieres Corral |

| 8 May 2024 | Deportivo Zamora | 0–0 | Acatlán | Zamora, Michoacán |
| 20:00 CST (UTC−6) | | Report | | Stadium: Unidad Deportiva El Chamizal; Attendance: 1,200; Referee: Axelle Daniel Hernández Pérez |

| 9 May 2024 | H2O Purépechas | 1–0 | Guerreros de Autlán | Morelia, Michoacán |
| 11:00 CST (UTC−6) | Galván 5' (own) | Report | | Stadium: Cancha 15 de Policía y Tránsito; Attendance: 100; Referee: Rogelio Sergio Arellano Corona |

| 9 May 2024 | Dragones de Oaxaca | 2–1 | Pioneros Junior | Zimatlán de Álvarez, Oaxaca |
| 16:00 CST (UTC−6) | Méndez 63'; Ruiz 87' | Report | Vidal 38' | Stadium: Unidad Deportiva Ignacio Mejía; Attendance: 1,000; Referee: Hazael Aldair Pérez Corte |

Second leg

| 11 May 2024 | Tigres de Alica | 1–0 (3–1 agg.) | Aves Blancas | Tepic, Nayarit |
| 11:30 MST (UTC−7) | Gutiérrez 49' | Report | | Stadium: Unidad Deportiva Juanelo; Attendance: 1,000; Referee: Daniel Misael Marin Quiroz |

| 11 May 2024 | Muxes | 2–1 (4–2 agg.) | Tuzos Pachuca | Mexico City |
| 16:00 CST (UTC−6) | García 88', 90' | Report | Calderón 12' | Stadium: Cancha de San Isidro; Attendance: 0 Referee: Pablo Eduardo Benítez Lara |

| 11 May 2024 | Orishas Tepeji | 3–3 (4–6 agg.) | Yautepec | Tepeji, Hidalgo |
| 18:00 CST (UTC−6) | De la Vega 35'; Noguez 54'; Iankov 66' | Report | Meléndez 65'; Aguilar 81'; Mendoza 90' | Stadium: Deportivo Tepeji; Attendance: 300; Referee: Brayan Daniel Escobar Hernández |

| 11 May 2024 | Faraones de Texcoco | 2–0 (3–0 agg.) | Estudiantes del COBACH | Texcoco, State of Mexico |
| 19:00 CST (UTC−6) | Alvarado 22'; Sotelo 88' | Report | | Stadium: Estadio Municipal Claudio Suárez; Attendance: 1,300; Referee: Omar Alejandro Ortega García |

| 11 May 2024 | Gorilas de Juanacatlán | 3–2 (3–4 agg.) | Etchojoa | Juanacatlán, Jalisco |
| 19:30 CST (UTC−6) | Jáuregui 51'; Medina 54', 87' | Report | Buitimea 17'; Enríquez 84' | Stadium: Club Juanacatlán; Attendance: 600; Referee: Juan Daniel Peña Garza |

| 11 May 2024 | Acatlán | 0–0 (0–0 agg.) (5–4 p) | Deportivo Zamora | Zapotlanejo, Jalisco |
| 19:30 CST (UTC−6) | | Report | | Stadium: Estadio Miguel Hidalgo; Attendance: 1,000; Referee: Karol Jesús Zamudio Ulloa |

| 12 May 2024 | Pioneros Junior | 2–0 (3–2 agg.) | Dragones de Oaxaca | Cancún, Quintana Roo |
| 15:00 EST (UTC−5) | Huerta 12'; Valdez 17' | Report | | Stadium: Estadio Cancún 86; Attendance: 2,000; Referee: Luis Enrique Menéndez Meléndez |

| 12 May 2024 | Guerreros de Autlán | 2–2 (2–3 agg.) | H2O Purépechas | Autlán, Jalisco |
| 16:00 CST (UTC−6) | Robles 65'; Román 76' | Report | Conejo 9', 17' | Stadium: Unidad Deportiva Chapultepec; Attendance: 2,217; Referee: José Carlos Meléndez Cansino |

==== Zone Semi–finals ====
The first legs were played on 15 May, and the second legs were played on 18 May 2024.

| Team 1 | Agg. | Team 2 | 1st leg | 2nd leg |
|---|---|---|---|---|
| Muxes | 2–2 (3–4) | (p) Yautepec | 2–2 | 0–0 |
| Faraones de Texcoco | 0–0 | Pioneros Junior | 4–0 | 0–0 |
| Tigres de Alica | 4–1 | H2O Purépechas | 2–0 | 2–1 |
| Acatlán (p) | 1–1 (3–0) | Etchojoa | 1–0 | 0–1 |

First leg

| 15 May 2024 | H2O Purépechas | 0–2 | Tigres de Alica | Morelia, Michoacán |
| 11:00 CST (UTC−6) | | Report | Gutiérrez 55'; Alcántar 65' | Stadium: Cancha 15 de Policía y Tránsito; Attendance: 300; Referee: Brayan Daniel Escobar Hernández |

| 15 May 2024 | Pioneros Junior | 0–4 | Faraones de Texcoco | Cancún, Quintana Roo |
| 15:00 EST (UTC−5) | | Report | Sotelo 10', 32'; González 28'; Laymon 88' | Stadium: Estadio Cancún 86; Attendance: 1,000; Referee: Carlos Zohet Martínez Vega |

| 15 May 2024 | Yautepec | 2–2 | Muxes | Yautepec, Morelos |
| 18:00 CST (UTC−6) | Maldonado 75'; Mario Aguilar 81' | Report | Marco Aguilar 6'; Velázquez 87' | Stadium: Campo Deportivo Yautepec; Attendance: 2,000; Referee: Axelle Daniel Hernández Pérez |

| 15 May 2024 | Etchojoa | 0–1 | Acatlán | Etchojoa, Sonora |
| 19:00 MST (UTC−7) | | Report | Rangel 75' | Stadium: Estadio Trigueros; Attendance: 1,200; Referee: Karlo Geovanni Palmieres Corral |

Second leg

| 18 May 2024 | Tigres de Alica | 2–1 (4–1 agg.) | H2O Purépechas | Tepic, Nayarit |
| 11:30 MST (UTC−7) | Modesto 62'; Alcántar 65' | Report | Conejo 13' | Stadium: Unidad Deportiva Juanelo; Attendance: 1,000; Referee: Rogelio Sergio Arellano Corona |

| 18 May 2024 | Muxes | 0–0 (2–2 agg.) (3–4 p) | Yautepec | Mexico City |
| 16:00 CST (UTC−6) | | Report | | Stadium: Cancha de San Isidro; Attendance: 0 Referee: Alan Eduardo Contreras Sotelo |

| 18 May 2024 | Faraones de Texcoco | 0–0 (4–0 agg.) | Pioneros Junior | Texcoco, State of Mexico |
| 19:00 CST (UTC−6) | | Report | | Stadium: Estadio Municipal Claudio Suárez; Attendance: 7,000; Referee: Saúl Humberto Ali Guzmán |

| 18 May 2024 | Acatlán | 0–1 (1–1 agg.) (3–0 p) | Etchojoa | Zapotlanejo, Jalisco |
| 19:30 CST (UTC−6) | | Report | Enríquez 84' | Stadium: Estadio Miguel Hidalgo; Attendance: 1,000; Referee: Daniel Misael Marin Quiroz |

==== Zone Finals ====
The first legs were played on 22 and 23 May, and the second legs were played on 25 and 26 May 2024.

| Team 1 | Agg. | Team 2 | 1st leg | 2nd leg |
|---|---|---|---|---|
| Faraones de Texcoco | 4–1 | Yautepec | 2–0 | 2–1 |
| Tigres de Alica | 1–2 | Acatlán | 0–2 | 1–0 |

First leg

| 22 May 2024 | Acatlán | 2–0 | Tigres de Alica | Zapotlanejo, Jalisco |
| 19:30 CST (UTC−6) | Moreno 53'; Patiño 81' | Report | | Stadium: Estadio Miguel Hidalgo; Attendance: 2,000; Referee: Brayan Daniel Escobar Hernández |

| 23 May 2024 | Yautepec | 0–2 | Faraones de Texcoco | Yautepec, Morelos |
| 18:00 CST (UTC−6) | | Report | Alvarado 9'; Arroyo 36' | Stadium: Campo Deportivo Yautepec; Attendance: 5,500; Referee: Saúl Humberto Ali Guzmán |

Second leg

| 25 May 2024 | Tigres de Alica | 1–0 (1–2 agg.) | Acatlán | Tepic, Nayarit |
| 11:30 MST (UTC−7) | Gutiérrez 57' | Report | | Stadium: Unidad Deportiva Juanelo; Attendance: 4,300; Referee: Rogelio Sergio Arellano Corona |

| 26 May 2024 | Faraones de Texcoco | 2–1 (4–1 agg.) | Yautepec | Texcoco, State of Mexico |
| 19:00 CST (UTC−6) | Alvarado 62', 70' | Report | Meléndez 59' | Stadium: Estadio Municipal Claudio Suárez; Attendance: 10,000; Referee: Omar Alejandro Ortega García |

==== National Final ====
The match was played on 31 May 2024 at Estadio Instalaciones de la Casa de Fútbol, Toluca.

| Team 1 | Score | Team 2 |
|---|---|---|
| Acatlán | 1–3 | Faraones de Texcoco |

| 31 May 2024 | Acatlán | 1–3 | Faraones de Texcoco | Toluca |
| 11:00 CST (UTC−6) | Chacón 85' | Report | Alvarado 40'; Flores 56', 82' | Stadium: Instalaciones de la Casa del Fútbol; Attendance: 800; Referee: Fernando Guerrero Ramírez |

2023–24 winners

1st title

== Reserve and Development Teams ==
Each season a table is created among those teams that don't have the right to promote, because they are considered as reserve teams for teams that play in Liga MX, Liga de Expansión and Liga Premier or are independent teams that have requested not to participate for the Promotion due to the fact that they are footballers development projects. The ranking order is determined through the "quotient", which is obtained by dividing the points obtained between the disputed matches, being ordered from highest to lowest.

=== Table ===
| P | Team | Pts | G | Pts/G | GD |
|---|---|---|---|---|---|
| 1 | Cimarrones de Sonora | 50 | 18 | 2.78 | +32 |
| 2 | Artesanos Metepec | 58 | 22 | 2.64 | +47 |
| 3 | Aragón | 73 | 30 | 2.43 | +48 |
| 4 | Toluca | 50 | 22 | 2.27 | +37 |
| 5 | Deportiva Venados | 59 | 26 | 2.27 | +40 |
| 6 | Leones Negros UdeG | 58 | 26 | 2.23 | +21 |
| 7 | Necaxa | 57 | 26 | 2.19 | +33 |
| 8 | Mineros Querétaro | 61 | 28 | 2.18 | +47 |
| 9 | Dorados de Sinaloa | 57 | 27 | 2.11 | +27 |
| 10 | Juárez | 63 | 30 | 2.10 | +43 |
| 11 | FuraMochis | 55 | 27 | 2.04 | +25 |
| 12 | Inter de Querétaro | 55 | 28 | 1.96 | +40 |
| 13 | Celaya | 54 | 28 | 1.93 | +50 |
| 14 | Panteras Neza | 42 | 22 | 1.91 | +17 |
| 15 | Alebrijes de Oaxaca | 45 | 24 | 1.88 | +16 |
| 16 | Boston Cancún | 48 | 26 | 1.85 | +19 |
| 17 | Halcones AFU | 38 | 21 | 1.81 | +19 |
| 18 | Mineros de Zacatecas | 47 | 26 | 1.81 | +11 |
| 19 | Pachuca | 37 | 22 | 1.68 | +29 |
| 20 | Tigres SD | 39 | 24 | 1.63 | +2 |
| 21 | Xolos de Hermosillo | 29 | 18 | 1.61 | +1 |
| 22 | Tecos | 41 | 26 | 1.58 | –8 |
| 23 | Correcaminos UAT | 37 | 24 | 1.54 | +3 |
| 24 | Atlante Xalapa | 42 | 30 | 1.40 | +1 |
| 25 | Tornados Tlaquepaque | 35 | 26 | 1.35 | –2 |
| 26 | Calor Torreón | 31 | 24 | 1.29 | –3 |
| 27 | Atlético Acaponeta | 32 | 27 | 1.19 | –12 |
| 28 | Alteños Acatic | 30 | 26 | 1.15 | –10 |
| 29 | Cañoneros | 30 | 30 | 1.00 | –43 |
| 30 | León GEN | 20 | 26 | 0.77 | –38 |
| 31 | Inter Guanajuato | 20 | 28 | 0.71 | –43 |
| 32 | Coras | 16 | 27 | 0.59 | –45 |
| 33 | Caja Oblatos – Furia Roja | 13 | 26 | 0.50 | –36 |
| 34 | Ciervos | 10 | 22 | 0.45 | –49 |
| 35 | Napoli Tabasco | 7 | 26 | 0.27 | –60 |

Last updated: April 20, 2024
Source: Liga TDP
P = Position; G = Games played; Pts = Points; Pts/G = Ratio of points to games played; GD = Goal difference

=== Play–offs ===
Round of 16
1 | Cimarrones de Sonora | 0 | 4 | 4
16 | Boston Cancún | 1 | 0 | 0
2 | Artesanos Metepec | 0 | 1 | 1
15 | Alebrijes de Oaxaca | 1 | 1 | 2
5 | Deportiva Venados | 2 | 2 | 4
12 | Inter Querétaro | 1 | 1 | 2
7 | Necaxa | 0 | 2 | 2
10 | Juárez | 0 | 0 | 0
3 | Aragón | 1 | 4 | 5
14 | Panteras Neza | 0 | 0 | 0
6 | Leones Negros | 0 | 2 | 2
11 | FuraMochis | 1 | 2 | 3
4 | Toluca | 2 | 5 | 7
13 | Celaya | 1 | 0 | 1
8 | Mineros Querétaro | 4 | 1 | 5
9 | Dorados de Sinaloa | 1 | 2 | 3

Quarter–finals
1 | Cimarrones de Sonora | 1 | 3 | 4
15 | Alebrijes de Oaxaca | 1 | 0 | 1
5 | Deportiva Venados | 1 | 0 | 1
7 | Necaxa | 0 | 0 | 0
3 | Aragón | 1 | 2 | 3
11 | FuraMochis | 2 | 0 | 2
4 | Toluca | 2 | 1 | 3
8 | Mineros Querétaro | 0 | 1 | 1

Semi–finals
1 | Cimarrones de Sonora | 3 | 2 | 5
5 | Deportiva Venados | 1 | 1 | 2
3 | Aragón | 0 | 2 | 2
4 | Toluca | 3 | 1 | 4

Final
1 | Cimarrones de Sonora (a.e.t.) | 0 | 3 | 3
4 | Toluca | 1 | 1 | 2

==== Round of 16 ====
The first legs were played on 24 and 25 April, and the second legs were played on 27 and 28 April 2024.

| Team 1 | Agg. | Team 2 | 1st leg | 2nd leg |
|---|---|---|---|---|
| Cimarrones de Sonora | 4–1 | Boston Cancún | 0–1 | 4–0 |
| Artesanos Metepec | 1–2 | Alebrijes de Oaxaca | 0–1 | 1–1 |
| Aragón | 5–0 | Panteras Neza | 1–0 | 4–0 |
| Toluca | 7–1 | Celaya | 2–1 | 5–0 |
| Deportiva Venados | 4–2 | Inter Querétaro | 2–1 | 2–1 |
| Leones Negros UdeG | 2–3 | FuraMochis | 0–1 | 2–2 |
| Necaxa | 2–0 | Juárez | 0–0 | 2–0 |
| Mineros Querétaro | 5–3 | Dorados de Sinaloa | 4–1 | 1–2 |

First leg

| 24 April 2024 | Boston Cancún | 1–0 | Cimarrones de Sonora | Cancún, Quintana Roo |
| 10:00 EST (UTC−5) | Arreola 47' | Report | | Stadium: CEDAR Cancún; Attendance: 200; Referee: Heisel Gerardo Santana Arguelles |

| 24 April 2024 | Celaya | 1–2 | Toluca | Comonfort, Guanajuato |
| 10:00 CST (UTC−6) | Loeza 44' | Report | Dávila 1'; Bravo 34' | Stadium: Circuito Deportivo Brígido Vargas; Attendance: 100; Referee: Fernando Israel Elizárraga Ramírez |

| 24 April 2024 | Inter Querétaro | 1–2 | Deportiva Venados | Santa Rosa Jáuregui, Querétaro |
| 10:00 CST (UTC−6) | Bertoni 7' | Report | Ciprián 38'; Acosta 74' | Stadium: Parque Bicentenario; Attendance: 100; Referee: Keven Iván Pérez Mendoza |

| 24 April 2024 | Dorados de Sinaloa | 1–4 | Mineros Querétaro | Culiacán, Sinaloa |
| 10:00 MST (UTC−7) | Rivera 45' | Report | Mendoza 21', 50', 69'; Camacho 38' | Stadium: Estadio Dorados; Attendance: 50; Referee: Karol Jesús Zamudio Ulloa |

| 24 April 2024 | Juárez | 0–0 | Necaxa | Xochimilco, Mexico City |
| 15:00 CST (UTC−6) | | Report | | Stadium: Cancha San Isidro; Attendance: 100; Referee: Andrés Benjamín Hernández Barraza |

| 25 April 2024 | Panteras Neza | 0–1 | Aragón | Ciudad Nezahualcóyotl, State of Mexico |
| 12:00 CST (UTC−6) | | Report | Ornelas 12' | Stadium: Estadio Metropolitano; Attendance: 200; Referee: Edgar Jesús Tinoco Orrante |

| 25 April 2024 | FuraMochis | 1–0 | Leones Negros UdeG | Los Mochis, Sinaloa |
| 15:00 MST (UTC−7) | Pérez 35' | Report | | Stadium: Club FuraMochis; Attendance: 300; Referee: Abraham Guadalupe Espinoza Serrano |

| 25 April 2024 | Alebrijes de Oaxaca | 1–0 | Artesanos Metepec | Oaxaca City, Oaxaca |
| 19:00 CST (UTC−6) | Bustos 58' | Report | | Stadium: Estadio Tecnológico de Oaxaca; Attendance: 1,000; Referee: Hazael Aldair Pérez Corte |

Second leg

| 27 April 2024 | Mineros Querétaro | 1–2 (5–3 agg.) | Dorados de Sinaloa | Colón, Querétaro |
| 10:00 CST (UTC−6) | Tarrats 55' | Report | Tirado 18'; Uriarte 30' | Stadium: Universidad CEICKOR; Attendance: 100; Referee: Daniel Sinue García Sánchez |

| 27 April 2024 | Toluca | 5–0 (7–1 agg.) | Celaya | Metepec, State of Mexico |
| 10:00 CST (UTC−6) | Jiménez 23', 44'; Urbina 46'; Dávila 59'; Palacios 89' | Report | | Stadium: Instalaciones de Metepec Cancha 3 Attendance: 50; Referee: Ángel Emmanuel Alzaga Esquivel |

| 27 April 2024 | Cimarrones de Sonora | 4–0 (4–1 agg.) | Boston Cancún | Hermosillo, Sonora |
| 10:00 MST (UTC−7) | Martínez 35', 55'; Ruíz 77'; Sosa 89' | Report | | Stadium: Estadio Héroe de Nacozari; Attendance: 0 Referee: Christian Cruz Mejía |

| 27 April 2024 | Necaxa | 2–0 (2–0 agg.) | Juárez | Aguascalientes City, Aguascalientes |
| 11:00 CST (UTC−6) | Torres 37'; Casas 51' | Report | | Stadium: Casa Club Necaxa Cancha 4 Attendance: 100; Referee: Zahid Sebastián Manjarrez García |

| 27 April 2024 | Deportiva Venados | 2–1 (4–2 agg.) | Inter Querétaro | Tamanché, Yucatán |
| 15:00 CST (UTC−6) | Ciprián 5', 21' | Report | Marchán 14' | Stadium: Estadio Alonso Diego Molina; Attendance: 200; Referee: Edwin Alejandro Marín Luna |

| 28 April 2024 | Leones Negros UdeG | 2–2 (2–3 agg.) | FuraMochis | Zapopan, Jalisco |
| 11:00 CST (UTC−6) | Monteón 37'; Morales 45' | Report | Pérez 74'; Guerrero 76' | Stadium: Club Deportivo La Primavera U. de G. Attendance: 150; Referee: Mario Velázquez Román |

| 28 April 2024 | Artesanos Metepec | 1–1 (1–2 agg.) | Alebrijes de Oaxaca | Metepec, State of Mexico |
| 12:00 CST (UTC−6) | Torres 11' | Report | Rodríguez 34' (own) | Stadium: Unidad Deportiva Alarcón Hisojo; Attendance: 100; Referee: Pablo Eduardo Benítez Lara |

| 28 April 2024 | Aragón | 4–0 (5–0 agg.) | Panteras Neza | Mexico City |
| 16:00 CST (UTC−6) | Gómez 23'; Villegas 38'; Vera 59'; Casas 90' | Report | | Stadium: Deportivo Francisco Zarco; Attendance: 500; Referee: Rafael Venancio Gutiérrez |

==== Quarter–finals ====
The first legs were played on 1 and 2 May, and the second legs were played on 4 and 5 May 2024.

| Team 1 | Agg. | Team 2 | 1st leg | 2nd leg |
|---|---|---|---|---|
| Cimarrones de Sonora | 4–1 | Alebrijes de Oaxaca | 1–1 | 3–0 |
| Aragón | 3–2 | FuraMochis | 1–2 | 2–0 |
| Toluca | 3–1 | Mineros Querétaro | 2–0 | 1–1 |
| Deportiva Venados | 1–0 | Necaxa | 1–0 | 0–0 |

First leg

| 1 May 2024 | Mineros Querétaro | 0–2 | Toluca | Colón, Querétaro |
| 10:00 CST (UTC−6) | | Report | Dávila 19'; Gómez 90' | Stadium: Universidad CEICKOR; Attendance: 140; Referee: Ángel Emmanuel Alzaga Esquivel |

| 1 May 2024 | Alebrijes de Oaxaca | 1–1 | Cimarrones de Sonora | Oaxaca City, Oaxaca |
| 19:00 CST (UTC−6) | Gallinar 63' | Report | Chávez 75' (own) | Stadium: Estadio Tecnológico de Oaxaca; Attendance: 400; Referee: Luis Felipe Villafuerte Villa |

| 2 May 2024 | Necaxa | 0–1 | Deportiva Venados | Aguascalientes City, Aguascalientes |
| 11:00 CST (UTC−6) | | Report | Escobar 68' | Stadium: Casa Club Necaxa Cancha 4 Attendance: 20; Referee: Yitzhak Emmanuel Jacobo Hernández |

| 2 May 2024 | FuraMochis | 2–1 | Aragón | Los Mochis, Sinaloa |
| 15:00 MST (UTC−7) | Echavarría 54'; Cota 89' | Report | Gómez 83' | Stadium: Club FuraMochis; Attendance: 152; Referee: Eber Antonio Ríos López |

Second leg

| 4 May 2024 | Toluca | 1–1 (3–1 agg.) | Mineros Querétaro | Metepec, State of Mexico |
| 10:00 CST (UTC−6) | Gómez 43' | Report | Mendoza 11' | Stadium: Instalaciones de Metepec Cancha 3 Attendance: 50; Referee: Yoel Guzmán Hernández |

| 4 May 2024 | Cimarrones de Sonora | 3–0 (4–1 agg.) | Alebrijes de Oaxaca | Hermosillo, Sonora |
| 18:00 MST (UTC−7) | Martínez 30', 42'; Meléndez 48' | Report | | Stadium: Estadio Héroe de Nacozari; Attendance: 300; Referee: Karlo Geovanni Palmieres Corral |

| 5 May 2024 | Deportiva Venados | 0–0 (1–0 agg.) | Necaxa | Tamanché, Yucatán |
| 11:00 CST (UTC−6) | | Report | | Stadium: Estadio Alonso Diego Molina; Attendance: 200; Referee: Carlos Alberto Casas García |

| 5 May 2024 | Aragón | 2–0 (3–2 agg.) | FuraMochis | Mexico City |
| 16:00 CST (UTC−6) | Dávila 7'; Gómez 46' | Report | | Stadium: Deportivo Francisco Zarco; Attendance: 200; Referee: Juan Daniel Peña Garza |

==== Semi–finals ====
The first legs were played on 8 and 9 May, and the second legs were played on 11 and 12 May 2024.

| Team 1 | Agg. | Team 2 | 1st leg | 2nd leg |
|---|---|---|---|---|
| Cimarrones de Sonora | 5–2 | Deportiva Venados | 3–1 | 2–1 |
| Aragón | 2–4 | Toluca | 0–3 | 2–1 |

First leg

| 8 May 2024 | Deportiva Venados | 1–3 | Cimarrones de Sonora | Tamanché, Yucatán |
| 16:00 CST (UTC−6) | Hernández 46' | Report | Orrantia 5'; Martínez 17', 44' | Stadium: Estadio Alonso Diego Molina; Attendance: 150; Referee: Luis Felipe Villafuerte Villa |

| 9 May 2024 | Toluca | 3–0 | Aragón | Metepec, State of Mexico |
| 10:00 CST (UTC−6) | Jiménez 37'; Bravo 53'; Alvarado 88' | Report | | Stadium: Instalaciones de Metepec Cancha 3 Attendance: 100; Referee: Saúl Humberto Ali Guzmán |

Second leg

| 11 May 2024 | Cimarrones de Sonora | 2–1 (5–2 agg.) | Deportiva Venados | Hermosillo, Sonora |
| 18:00 MST (UTC−7) | Martínez 2'; Sosa 70' | Report | Maya 66' | Stadium: Estadio Héroe de Nacozari; Attendance: 238; Referee: Alejandro Torres Favela |

| 12 May 2024 | Aragón | 2–1 (2–4 agg.) | Toluca | Mexico City |
| 16:00 CST (UTC−6) | Dávila 15'; Gómez 68' | Report | Jiménez 45' | Stadium: Deportivo Francisco Zarco; Attendance: 500; Referee: Andrés Benjamín Hernández Barraza |

==== Final ====
The first leg was played on 16 May, and the second leg was played on 19 May 2024.

| Team 1 | Agg. | Team 2 | 1st leg | 2nd leg |
|---|---|---|---|---|
| Cimarrones de Sonora (a.e.t.) | 3–2 | Toluca | 0–1 | 3–1 |

First leg

| 16 May 2024 | Toluca | 1–0 | Cimarrones de Sonora | Toluca, State of Mexico |
| 10:00 CST (UTC−6) | Castillo 68' | Report | | Stadium: Estadio Nemesio Díez; Attendance: 500; Referee: Luis Felipe Villafuerte Villa |

Second leg

| 19 May 2024 | Cimarrones de Sonora | 3–1 (a.e.t.) (3–2 agg.) | Toluca | Hermosillo, Sonora |
| 18:00 MST (UTC−7) | Orrantia 18'; Martínez 22', 94' | Report | Jiménez 45' | Stadium: Estadio Héroe de Nacozari; Attendance: 600; Referee: Alejandro Torres Favela |

2023–24 winners

2nd title

== Regular season statistics ==
=== Top goalscorers ===
Players sorted first by goals scored, then by last name.

| Rank | Player | Club | Goal |
|---|---|---|---|
| 1 | (Mexico) Efrén Hernández | Águila Azteca | 41 |
| 2 | (Mexico) Fabrizzio Olvera | Licántropos | 34 |
| 3 | (Mexico) Esteban Mendoza | Mineros Querétaro | 33 |
| 4 | (Mexico) Johan Moreno | Cuervos Blancos | 29 |
| 5 | (Mexico) Dorian Mota | Coyotes Neza / Héroes de Zaci | 28 |
| 6 | (Mexico) Sebastián Luna | Pabellóon | 25 |
| 6 | (Mexico) Emiliano Trejo | Muxes | 25 |
| 8 | (Mexico) Daniel Parra | Legado del Centenario | 24 |
| 9 | (Mexico) Juan Arias | Atlético Leonés | 23 |
| 9 | (Mexico) Jesús Quiroz | Santiago | 23 |
| 9 | (Mexico) Yael Valdéz | Cordobés | 23 |

Source:Liga TDP

== See also ==
- 2023–24 Liga MX season
- 2023–24 Liga de Expansión MX season
- 2023–24 Serie A de México season
- 2023–24 Serie B de México season
- 2024 Copa Conecta
