= Faraones de Texcoco =

Mexican football club

- Full name: Club Faraones de Texcoco
- Nickname: Faraones (The pharaohs)
- Founded: August 2017; 9 years ago
- Dissolved: 12 June 2025; 15 months ago
- Ground: Estadio Municipal Claudio Suárez; Texcoco, State of Mexico
- Capacity: 4,000
- Owner: Alejandro González Oliva
- Chairman: Alejandro González Oliva
- Manager: Oscar Linton
- League: Liga Premier de México - Serie A
- Clausura 2025: 5th – Group III
Home colours	Away colours

Faraones de Texcoco was a Mexican football club that played in the Liga Premier – Serie A of the Segunda División de México, the third division level of Mexican football. The club was based in Texcoco, State of Mexico.

== History ==
The club was founded in August 2017 with the goal of having a team that represented Texcoco. Previously, there had been clubs based in this town like Deportivo Neza, Atlético Veracruz or Emperadores de Texcoco, but had been re-established in that place or were operated and integrated by people from other cities.

In the 2018–19 season, the team finished the regular season with 68 points and reached the round of 16 in the championship phase. In the 2020–21 season, the team achieved the lead in group VII with 82 points and thus was able to access the play-off phase for promotion. In the first rounds, they eliminated the Sangre de Campeón and Deportiva Venados clubs, to finally be eliminated in the quarterfinals of the zone by Fuertes de Fortín, thus closing the best participation so far.

In the 2022–23 season, the team was one round away from reaching promotion, when they were eliminated in the semifinals against Artesanos Metepec.

Finally, in the 2023–24 season, the team achieved promotion to the Segunda División de México after defeating Pioneros Junior in the semifinal round. Previously, the Faraones had eliminated the clubs Academia Mineros CDMX, Cruz Azul Lagunas and Estudiantes del COBACH, so on May 18, 2024, they won their promotion to the third tier of Mexican football system. A week later the team confirmed its promotion to the Serie A, the Segunda División main category, after defeating Yautepec on the regional final. On May 31, Faraones de Texcoco became the Tercera División national champion by defeating Acatlán in the final.

In the 2024–25 season, the team performed well in the league, but failed to qualify for the promotion play-offs due to the limited number of places available. However, the club performed remarkably well for a newly promoted team, as well as being one of the clubs with the best attendance figures.

On June 12, 2025, the team's board announced the club's hiatus due to a lack of financial and institutional resources to sustain the Faraones's participation, and therefore will not participate in the 2025–26 season, although maintaining the possibility of returning in the future if the team's operating conditions improve.

== Honors ==
- Liga TDP Champions: 1

2023–24

== Current squad ==
As of 11 January 2025

Note: Flags indicate national team as defined under FIFA eligibility rules; some limited exceptions apply. Players may hold more than one non-FIFA nationality.

No. / Pos. / Nation / Player	No. / Pos. / Nation / Player

=== Reserve teams ===
Faraones de Texcoco (Liga TDP)
Reserve team that plays in the Liga TDP, the fourth level of the Mexican league system.
