= Acatlán F.C. =

Acatlán
- Full name: Acatlán Fútbol Club
- Founded: 2016; 10 years ago
- Dissolved: 31 July 2025; 15 months ago
- Ground: Estadio Municipal Miguel Hidalgo; Zapotlanejo, Jalisco
- Capacity: 1,800
- Owner: Ernesto de la Torre
- Chairman: Diego Jiménez
- Manager: Arturo Magaña
- League: Liga Premier de México - Serie A
- Clausura 2025: 11th – Group III
Home colours

Acatlán Fútbol Club was a Mexican football club that played in the Liga Premier – Serie A of the Segunda División de México, the third division level of Mexican football. It was based in Zapotlanejo, Jalisco.

== History ==
The team was created in 2016 after the relocation of Vaqueros Bellavista to Guadalajara, Jalisco.

In the 2017–2018 season, Acatlán finished as group champion. In the promotion playoffs, the team eliminated Troyanos UDEM, Tuzos UAZ, Club Hidalguense, Atlético Valladolid, Águilas UAS and C.D. Uruapan, to reach the division final. In the final of the category, Acatlán faced the F.C. Marina tied for 1–1 in the aggregate, in the penalty shootout, Acatlán won 4–5 getting its first title in their history.

Despite winning the promotion to the Liga Premier – Serie A, the team was not certified to participate in the division, so its franchise was relocated to Tepic, Nayarit and was renamed as Coras de Tepic. In the 2018–2019 season, the Acatlán team remained, but played with the name Futcenter. In 2019, the team returned to its original name officially.

In the 2023–24 season, the team once again won promotion to the Liga Premier – Serie A. On May 25, 2024, Acatlán defeated Tigres de Alica to achieve promotion. Finally, the team finished the season as runners-up in the Tercera División de México after being defeated by Faraones de Texcoco in the national final.

After the Acatlán promotion, a group of businessmen from Tepatitlán bought the club and planned to relocate the team to Tepatitlán, Jalisco. The new owners of Acatlán attempted to move the team to their city, however, the management of Tepatitlán F.C. did not grant permission to do the movement, so Acatlán paused its attempt to move from Zapotlanejo pending a future change of name and venue of the Tepa team.

In the event of a possible future relocation, the team was internally renamed CEFOR Tepatitlán, in addition to adopting the colors red and blue as its main identity. However, officially the team maintains the name Acatlán F.C. in the competitions organized by the Federación Mexicana de Fútbol (FMF) and Segunda División.

In January 2025, the club board abandoned its intentions to establish Acatlán F.C. in Tepatitlán after receiving support from the local government of Arandas, Jalisco, where it had been established since the fall of 2024. As a result, the team abandoned the alternate brand of CEFOR Tepatitlán to use a new one called Trinca Guinda F.C. In June 2025, the team returned to Zapotlanejo without explaining the reasons for the relocation.

In July 2025, Acatlán F.C. was dissolved to transfer its license to a new club called ACF Zapotlanejo.

== Honors ==
- Tercera División de México (1): 2017–2018
