= C.D. Yautepec =

Mexican football club

- Full name: Club Deportivo Yautepec
- Nickname: CDY
- Founded: October 2015; 10 years ago
- Ground: Campo Deportivo Yautepec; Yautepec, Mexico
- Capacity: 3,000
- Manager: TBA
- League: Liga TDP – Group 8
- 2025–26: Pre–season
Home colours	Away colours

C.D. Yautepec is a football club that plays in the Liga TDP. It is based in Yautepec, Mexico.

== History ==
The team was established in 2015 when the JFS Jardón club was relocated to Yautepec, so the team officially competed with that identity. In 2020 the C.D. Yautepec was officially established by obtaining its own registration in the Liga TDP.

In the 2023–24 season, the team achieved its best performance in the regular season, finishing in first position in Group 7, qualifying for the play-offs. After eliminating the teams Arietes F.C., Sk Sport F.C., Orishas Tepeji and C.D. Muxes, C.D. Yautepec achieved its promotion to the Liga Premier de México on May 18, 2024.

On June 28, 2024 the team had been announced as a new participant in the Liga Premier – Serie B, after its promotion the club had plans to relocate to Manzanillo, Colima. However, on July 15, Yautepec announced its abandonment of the competition because the team did not obtain the necessary financial resources to finance its participation in the league. However, at the end of July the team announced its continuation in the Serie B and they will remain in Yautepec after obtaining support from the local government.

On September 5, 2024 the team went on hiatus due to financial problems, so they did not participate in any league during the 2024–25 season.

For the 2025–26 season, Yautepec resumed its activity, although once again participating in the Liga TDP, so the team never occupied the place in the Liga Premier that it had won sportingly in 2024.
