= Guerreros de Autlán =

- Full name: Club Guerreros de Autlán
- Nickname: Guerreros (Warriors)
- Founded: 2002; 24 years ago (as Club Deportivo Autlán); 2023; 3 years ago (as Club Guerreros de Autlán)
- Ground: Unidad Deportiva Chapultepec; Autlán, Jalisco
- Capacity: 1,500
- Owner: José Luis Rentería
- Chairman: José Luis Rentería
- Manager: Sergio Díaz
- League: Liga Premier (Premier A)
- 2025–26: Liga Premier (Serie A); Regular phase: 9th (Group I); Final phase: Did not qualify
Home colours	Away colours

Club Guerreros de Autlán is a Mexican professional football club based in Autlán, Jalisco. It competes in Premier A, the intermediate branch of the Liga Premier de México, the third tier of Mexican football, and plays its home matches at the Unidad Deportiva Chapultepec. Founded in 2002 as Club Deportivo Autlán, the club was dissolved in 2008 and refounded in 2023 under its current name but registered as Atlético Cocula. In 2025, the franchise has been registered under its official name.

== History ==
The club first appeared in the 2002 under the name of Club Deportivo Autlán, it participated in the Segunda División de México and finished as runners-up in the Apertura 2004, while their affiliate B team finished as champions of the Tercera División de México in the same year (Apertura 2004). In 2008, the team was dissolved after selling its place in the Segunda División to C.D. Oro. In 2014, the team returned to competition for a brief period in the Tercera División, before being dissolved the following year.

After eight years of inactivity, the team was re-established on February 28, 2023, now under the name Guerreros de Autlán, and registered in the Tercera División de México, the fourth tier of Mexican football. However, due to regulatory issues, the team competed officially under the name Atlético Cocula, the franchise it leased to participate in the professional football.

On May 25, 2025, the team was promoted to the Liga Premier-Serie A after defeating C.F. Cadereyta in the Zona B semifinals. The team had finished the regular season in first place in its group and had previously eliminated Atlético Tesistán, Charales de Chapala, and Tapatíos Soccer. Guerreros de Autlán, registered under the name Atlético Cocula, finished as champions of Zona B after defeating Gorilas de Juanacatlán in the zone final, but finished as runners-up in the Tercera División de México after losing the final to Héroes de Zaci.

On June 27, 2025, the name Guerreros de Autlán was officially recognized by the Mexican Football Federation and its affiliated leagues, abandoning the old name Atlético Cocula.

== Players ==
=== First-team squad ===
As of 9 September 2026

Note: Flags indicate national team as defined under FIFA eligibility rules; some limited exceptions apply. Players may hold more than one non-FIFA nationality.

No.	Pos.	Nation	Player
1	GK	MEX	Omar López
2	DF	MEX	Diego Contreras
3	DF	MEX	Brandon López
4	DF	USA	Jared Gutiérrez
5	DF	MEX	Héctor Medina
6	MF	MEX	Daniel Loza
7	MF	MEX	Javier González
8	MF	MEX	Jonathan Mariano
9	FW	MEX	Juan José González
10	FW	MEX	Isaac Velasco
11	MF	MEX	Daniel Parra
15	DF	MEX	Pedro Gaspar
17	DF	MEX	Guillermo Silva
18	MF	MEX	Carlo Martínez

No.	Pos.	Nation	Player
19	MF	MEX	Leonel Flores
20	MF	MEX	José Cárdenas
21	DF	MEX	Edgar Olvera
23	FW	MEX	Néstor Pérez
24	DF	MEX	Néstor Rochín
26	FW	MEX	Javier Moreno
29	FW	MEX	Azael González
30	DF	MEX	Ailton Bernal
32	MF	MEX	Carlos Villezcas
33	FW	MEX	Alan Juárez
39	FW	MEX	Carlos Andrade
41	GK	MEX	Flavio Moreno
50	GK	MEX	Alan Santana

=== Reserve teams ===
Deportivo Purificación (Liga TDP)
Reserve team that plays in the Liga TDP, the fourth level of the Mexican league system

Tornados Tlaquepaque (Liga TDP)
Reserve team that plays in the Liga TDP, the fourth level of the Mexican league system

== Honours ==
=== National ===
==== Promotion divisions ====
- Segunda División
  - Runners-up (1): Apertura 2004
- Liga TDP
  - Runners-up (1): 2024–25
- Liga TDP Zona B
  - Champions (1): 2024–25

== Reserves ==
=== Deportivo Autlán "B" ===
The team participated in the Tercera División, finishing as champions in the Apertura 2004 tournament.
