= 2024–25 Liga TDP season =

Liga TDP
- Season: 2024–25
- Dates: 5 September 2024 – 6 June 2025
- Champions: Héroes de Zaci (2nd title)
- Matches: 2,915
- Goals: 9,408 (3.23 per match)
- Top goalscorer: Erick Robles (42 goals)
- Stats are from the regular season only

The 2024–25 Liga TDP season was the fourth-tier football league of Mexico. The tournament began on 5 September 2024 and finished on 6 June 2025.

== Competition format ==
The Tercera División (Third Division) is divided into 17 groups. Since the 2009–2010 season, the format of the tournament has been reorganized to a home and away format, which all teams will play in their respective group. The 17 groups consist of teams which are eligible to play in the liguilla de ascenso (promotion play–offs) for four promotion spots, teams who are affiliated with teams in the Liga MX, Liga de Expansión MX and Liga Premier and development teams, which are not eligible for promotion but will play that who the better team in a sixteen team reserves playoff tournament for the entire season.

The regulation awards three points for a win, one point for a tie and zero points for a loss, however, when a match ends tied, a penalty shoot-out is played to award a bonus point to the winning team of the penalty series.

The league format allows participating franchises to rent their place to another team, so some clubs compete with a different name than the one registered with the FMF.

For the 2024–25 season there will be four promotions to the Liga Premier. Two to Serie A and two to Serie B.

== Group 1 ==
Group with 14 teams from Campeche, Chiapas, Quintana Roo and Yucatán.

Location of teams in the 2024–25 Liga TDP Group 1 (Campeche)
Location of teams in the 2024–25 Liga TDP Group 1 (Quintana Roo)
Location of teams in the 2024–25 Liga TDP Group 1 (Chiapas)
Location of teams in the 2024–25 Liga TDP Group 1 (Yucatán)

=== Teams ===
Team	City	Home ground	Capacity	Affiliate	Official Name
Atlético Quintanarroense	Playa del Carmen, Quintana Roo	Sindicato de Taxistas Lázaro Cárdenas	1,000	–	–
Boston Cancún	Cancún, Quintana Roo	CEDAR Cancún	1,000	Cancún	—
Chetumal	Chetumal, Quintana Roo	José López Portillo	6,600	–	–
Corsarios de Campeche	Campeche, Campeche	Universitario de Campeche	4,000	—	—
Deportiva Venados	Tamanché, Yucatán	Alonso Diego Molina	2,500	Deportiva Venados	—
Deportivo CTM Búhos	Puerto Morelos, Quintana Roo	Unidad Deportiva Colonia Pescadores	1,200	–	–
Ejidatarios de Bonfil	Alfredo V. Bonfil, Quintana Roo	La Parcela	1,000	–	–
Felinos 48	Reforma, Chiapas	Cancha Unidad y Compromiso	600	–	–
Inter Playa del Carmen	Playa del Carmen, Quintana Roo	Unidad Deportiva Mario Villanueva Madrid	7,500	Inter Playa del Carmen	—
ISG Sport	Ciudad del Carmen, Campeche	Unidad Deportiva 20 de Noviembre	1,000	–	–
Mons Calpe Yucatán	Mérida, Yucatán	Unidad Deportiva SNTSS Dr. Oscar Hammeken	500	Mons Calpe	–
Pampaneros de Champotón	Champotón, Campeche	Nou Camp Champotón	1,000	–	–
Pioneros Junior	Cancún, Quintana Roo	Cancún 86	6,390	Pioneros de Cancún	—
Progreso	Progreso, Yucatán	20 de Noviembre	3,000	Venados	—

=== League table ===
Pos	Team	Pld	W	D	L	GF	GA	GD	BP	Pts	Qualification or relegation
1	Deportiva Venados	26	20	4	2	63	13	+50	3	67	Qualification to Liguilla de Filiales
2	Boston Cancún	26	17	6	3	48	19	+29	5	62	Qualification to Liguilla de Filiales
3	Ejidatarios de Bonfil	26	16	4	6	46	22	+24	4	56	Qualification to Liguilla de Ascenso
4	Corsarios de Campeche	26	13	7	6	32	19	+13	5	51	Qualification to Liguilla de Ascenso
5	Pioneros Junior	26	14	5	7	41	27	+14	1	48	Qualification to Liguilla de Ascenso
6	Progreso	26	11	7	8	37	30	+7	3	43	
7	Inter Playa del Carmen	26	12	5	9	49	32	+17	1	42	
8	Atlético Quintanarroense	26	8	7	11	30	42	−12	4	35	Qualification to Liguilla de Filiales
9	Chetumal	26	5	10	11	25	38	−13	6	31	
10	Mons Calpe Yucatán	26	5	9	12	23	35	−12	2	26	
11	Felinos 48	26	4	8	14	28	50	−22	6	26	
12	Deportivo CTM Búhos	26	6	3	17	25	55	−30	0	21	
13	ISG Sport	26	4	6	16	16	55	−39	2	20	
14	Pampaneros de Champotón	26	3	7	16	17	43	−26	2	18	

Updated to match(es) played on 27 April 2025. Source: Liga TDP

== Group 2 ==
Group with 14 teams from Chiapas, Oaxaca, Tabasco and Veracruz.

=== Teams ===
Location of teams in the 2024–25 Liga TDP Group 2 (Chiapas and Tabasco)
Location of teams in the 2023–24 Liga TDP Group 2 (Oaxaca and Veracruz)

Team	City	Home ground	Capacity	Affiliate	Official name
Alebrijes de Oaxaca	Oaxaca City, Oaxaca	Tecnológico de Oaxaca	14,598	Alebrijes de Oaxaca	–
Antequera	Oaxaca City, Oaxaca	Tecnológico de Oaxaca	14,598	–	–
Atlético Ixtepec	Ixtepec, Oaxaca	Brena Torres	1,000	—	–
CEFOR Chiapas	Tuxtla Gutiérrez, Chiapas	Flor de Sospo	3,000	–	–
Cruz Azul Lagunas	Lagunas, Oaxaca	Cruz Azul	2,000	Cruz Azul	–
Delfines de Coatzacoalcos	Coatzacoalcos, Veracruz	Rafael Hernández Ochoa	4,800	–	–
Dragones de Oaxaca	Zimatlán de Álvarez, Oaxaca	Unidad Deportiva Ignacio Mejía	1,000	–	–
Estudiantes del COBACH	Tuxtla Gutiérrez, Chiapas	Víctor Manuel Reyna	29,001	–	–
Lechuzas UPGCH	Tuxtla Gutiérrez, Chiapas	Flor de Sospo	3,000	–	–
Milenarios de Oaxaca	San Pablo Villa de Mitla, Oaxaca	Municipal San Pablo Villa de Mitla	1,000	–	–
Napoli Tabasco	Villahermosa, Tabasco	Olímpico de Villahermosa	12,000	Artesanos Metepec	Artesanos Bajos de Chila
Pijijiapan	Pijijiapan, Chiapas	Unidad Deportiva Pijijiapan	1,000	–	Iguanas
Tapachula Soconusco	Tapachula, Chiapas	Olímpico de Tapachula	18,017	Tapachula Soconusco	–
Universidad del Sureste	Comitán de Domínguez, Chiapas	Centro de Formación UDS	500	—	—

=== League table ===
Pos	Team	Pld	W	D	L	GF	GA	GD	BP	Pts	Qualification or relegation
1	Dragones de Oaxaca	26	21	4	1	61	12	+49	3	70	Qualification to Liguilla de Ascenso
2	Delfines de Coatzacoalcos	26	20	2	4	64	20	+44	1	63	Qualification to Liguilla de Ascenso
3	Estudiantes del COBACH	26	16	8	2	56	17	+39	4	60	Qualification to Liguilla de Ascenso
4	Tapachula Soconusco	26	16	6	4	57	24	+33	1	55	Qualification to Liguilla de Ascenso
5	Cruz Azul Lagunas	26	11	7	8	46	29	+17	6	46	
6	Napoli Tabasco	26	12	4	10	37	38	−1	2	42	Qualification to Liguilla de Filiales
7	Lechuzas UPGCH	26	9	6	11	35	33	+2	2	35	
8	CEFOR Chiapas	26	7	10	9	41	49	−8	4	35	
9	Alebrijes de Oaxaca	26	9	3	14	25	50	−25	2	32	Qualification to Liguilla de Filiales
10	Antequera	26	8	2	16	24	50	−26	1	27	
11	Atlético Ixtepec	26	6	4	16	40	61	−21	1	23	
12	Milenarios de Oaxaca	26	5	4	17	30	67	−37	2	21	
13	Pijijiapan	26	4	5	17	21	48	−27	3	20	
14	Universidad del Sureste	26	5	1	20	24	63	−39	1	17	

Updated to match(es) played on 27 April 2025. Source: Liga TDP

== Group 3 ==
Group with 16 teams from Puebla and Veracruz.

=== Teams ===
Location of teams in the 2024–25 Liga TDP Group 3 (Puebla and Tlaxcala)
Location of teams in the 2024–25 Liga TDP Group 3 (Oaxaca and Veracruz)

Team	City	Home ground	Capacity	Affiliate	Official Name
Académicos UGM	Orizaba, Veracruz	Universitario UGM	1,500	—	—
Águila Azteca	Chocamán, Veracruz	El Mariscal	2,000	–	–
Atlético Boca del Río	Veracruz City, Veracruz	Instituto Tecnológico de Veracruz	1,000	–	–
Caballeros de Córdoba	Córdoba, Veracruz	Rafael Murillo Vidal	3,800	—	—
Conejos de Tuxtepec	Tuxtepec, Oaxaca	Gustavo Pacheco Villaseñor	15,000	—	—
Córdoba	Córdoba, Veracruz	Rafael Murillo Vidal	3,800	—	–
Delfines UGM	Nogales, Veracruz	UGM Nogales	1,500	—	—
Delta	Tehuacán, Puebla	Polideportivo La Huizachera	1,000	—	—
Guerreros de Puebla	Puebla, Puebla	Unidad Deportiva Mario Vázquez Raña	800	–	–
Licántropos	Cuautinchán, Puebla	Campos El Cóndor	500	—	—
Lobos Puebla	Tepeaca, Puebla	Parque de la Familia	500	—	—
Los Ángeles	Puebla, Puebla	Unidad Deportiva Mario Vázquez Raña	800	—	—
Ocelot Academy MX	Mazatecochco, Tlaxcala	San José del Agua	1,000	–	Tlapa
PDLA	San Pedro Cholula, Puebla	Unidad Deportiva San Pedro Cholula	1,000	–	–
Reales de Puebla	Amozoc, Puebla	Unidad Deportiva Chachapa	1,000	—	—
Tehuacán	Tehuacán, Puebla	Polideportivo La Huizachera	1,000	—	—

=== League table ===
Pos	Team	Pld	W	D	L	GF	GA	GD	BP	Pts	Qualification or relegation
1	Águila Azteca	30	23	6	1	87	26	+61	4	79	Qualification to Liguilla de Ascenso
2	Delfines UGM	30	25	1	4	91	22	+69	1	77	Qualification to Liguilla de Ascenso
3	PDLA	30	21	4	5	85	42	+43	2	69	Qualification to Liguilla de Ascenso
4	Académicos UGM	30	15	9	6	61	26	+35	5	59	Qualification to Liguilla de Ascenso
5	Córdoba	30	17	5	8	74	37	+37	1	57	Qualification to Liguilla de Ascenso
6	Licántropos	30	14	9	7	59	33	+26	4	55	Qualification to Liguilla de Ascenso
7	Atlético Boca del Río	30	13	6	11	50	50	0	5	50	
8	Caballeros de Córdoba	30	11	11	8	46	35	+11	5	49	
9	Ocelot Academy MX	30	11	4	15	57	51	+6	3	40	
10	Tehuacán	30	8	5	17	42	63	−21	4	33	
11	Delta	30	10	2	18	28	52	−24	1	33	
12	Conejos de Tuxtepec	30	8	7	15	32	78	−46	2	33	
13	Reales de Puebla	30	5	6	19	31	81	−50	5	26	
14	Los Ángeles	30	4	9	17	29	73	−44	3	24	
15	Guerreros de Puebla	30	4	6	20	19	58	−39	1	19	
16	Lobos Puebla	30	3	6	21	26	90	−64	2	17	

Updated to match(es) played on 27 April 2025. Source: Liga TDP

== Group 4 ==
Group with 16 teams from Greater Mexico City.

=== Teams ===
Location of teams in the 2024–25 Liga TDP Group 4
Location of teams in the 2024–25 Liga TDP Group 4 (Rural Greater Mexico City)

Team	City	Home ground	Capacity	Affiliate	Official name
Álamos	Iztacalco, Mexico City	Magdalena Mixhuca Sports City Ground 1	500	Guadalajara	–
Aragón	Gustavo A. Madero, Mexico City	Deportivo Francisco Zarco	1,000	Atlético Aragón	–
Atlante Chalco	Tultitlán, State of Mexico	ESMAC	1,000	Atlante	–
Atlético Mexicano	Venustiano Carranza, Mexico City	Deportivo Eduardo Molina	500	–	–
Aztecas AMF Soccer	Gustavo A. Madero, Mexico City	Deportivo Francisco Zarco	1,000	–	–
Cañoneros	Ecatepec de Morelos, State of Mexico	Bicentenario Siervo de la Nación	1,000	–	–
Cefor Cuauhtémoc Blanco	Gustavo A. Madero, Mexico City	Deportivo Los Galeana	1,000	–	–
Cefor Mexiquense	Ecatepec, State of Mexico	Revolución 30-30	1,000	–	Promodep Central
Ecatepec	Ecatepec de Morelos, State of Mexico	Guadalupe Victoria	1,000	–	–
Independiente Mexiquense	Huehuetoca, State of Mexico	12 de Mayo	1,500	–	–
Formación Metropolitana	Gustavo A. Madero, Mexico City	Deportivo Francisco Zarco	1,000	–	–
Muxes	Iztacalco, Mexico City	Deportivo Lázaro Cárdenas	1,000	–	–
Oceanía	Venustiano Carranza, Mexico City	Deportivo Oceanía	1,000	–	–
Sangre de Campeón	Tultitlán, State of Mexico	Cancha Nou Camp	1,000	–	–
Santiago Tulantepec	Iztacalco, Mexico City	Magdalena Mixhuca Sports City Ground 1	500	–	–
Unión	Ecatepec, State of Mexico	Titanium Soccer	500	–	–

=== League table ===
Pos	Team	Pld	W	D	L	GF	GA	GD	BP	Pts	Qualification or relegation
1	Muxes	30	29	1	0	99	13	+86	0	88	Qualification to Liguilla de Ascenso
2	Ecatepec	30	24	3	3	113	22	+91	2	77	Qualification to Liguilla de Ascenso
3	Aragón	30	22	3	5	75	23	+52	1	70	Qualification to Liguilla de Filiales
4	Oceanía	30	19	4	7	76	34	+42	4	65	Qualification to Liguilla de Ascenso
5	Álamos	30	18	5	7	48	27	+21	2	61	Qualification to Liguilla de Ascenso
6	Independiente Mexiquense	30	16	3	11	45	34	+11	3	54	Qualification to Liguilla de Ascenso
7	Sangre de Campeón	30	15	5	10	56	47	+9	1	51	
8	Cefor Cuauhtémoc Blanco	30	11	8	11	50	44	+6	3	44	
9	Unión	30	11	6	13	48	51	−3	5	44	
10	Atlante Chalco	30	11	4	15	46	46	0	2	39	Qualification to Liguilla de Filiales
11	Cañoneros	30	8	6	16	42	66	−24	2	32	Qualification to Liguilla de Filiales
12	Formación Metropolitana	30	6	5	19	31	58	−27	2	25	
13	Aztecas AMF Soccer	30	4	7	19	25	55	−30	5	24	
14	Cefor Mexiquense	30	6	4	20	32	79	−47	2	24	
15	Atlético Mexicano	30	4	2	24	31	122	−91	0	14	
16	Santiago Tulantepec	30	1	4	25	17	113	−96	1	8	

Updated to match(es) played on 27 April 2025. Source: Liga TDP

== Group 5 ==
Group with 16 teams from Greater Mexico City.

=== Teams ===
Location of teams in the 2024–25 Liga TDP Group 5
Location of teams in the 2024–25 Liga TDP Group 5 (Rural Greater Mexico City)

Team	City	Home ground	Capacity	Affiliate	Official name
Academia América Leyendas	Coyoacán, Mexico City	Magdalena Mixhuca Sports City Ground 1	1,000	–	San José del Arenal
Academia Mineros CDMX	Iztacalco, Mexico City	Magdalena Mixhuca Sports City Ground 1	500	–	CH Fútbol Club
Arietes	Xochimilco, Mexico City	San Isidro	1,200	–	–
Coyotes F.C.	Xochimilco, Mexico City	Deportivo Huayamilpas	1,000	–	CILESI
Coyotes Neza	Venustiano Carranza, Mexico City	Deportivo Oceanía	1,000	–	Halcones Zúñiga
Cuemanco	Benito Juárez, Mexico City	Deportivo Benito Juárez	800	–	Atlético Pachuca
Domínguez Osos	Gustavo A. Madero, Mexico City	Deportivo Lázaro Cárdenas	1,000	–	–
Halcones de Rayón	Tlalpan, Mexico City	Tec de Monterrey Campus CDMX	500	–	–
Héroes de Zaci	Xochimilco, Mexico City	San Isidro	1,200	–	–
Irapuato Olimpo	Xochimilco, Mexico City	San Isidro	1,200	Irapuato	–
Juárez	Xochimilco, Mexico City	San Isidro La Noria	1,200	Juárez	–
Marina	Milpa Alta, Mexico City	Momoxco	3,500	–	–
Novillos Neza	Iztacalco, Mexico City	Magdalena Mixhuca Sports City Ground 3	500	–	–
Panteras Neza	Venustiano Carranza, Mexico City	Deportivo Lázaro Cárdenas	1,000	–	Azucareros de Tezonapa
Politécnico	Venustiano Carranza, Mexico City	Deportivo Leandro Valle	1,000	–	–
Valle de Xico	Iztacalco, Mexico City	Deportivo Lázaro Cárdenas	1,000	–	–

=== League table ===
Pos	Team	Pld	W	D	L	GF	GA	GD	BP	Pts	Qualification or relegation
1	Héroes de Zaci	30	25	2	3	123	27	+96	1	78	Qualification to Liguilla de Ascenso
2	Politécnico	30	18	8	4	54	28	+26	6	68	Qualification to Liguilla de Ascenso
3	Juárez	30	19	4	7	71	32	+39	3	64	Qualification to Liguilla de Filiales
4	Valle de Xico	30	17	8	5	63	34	+29	4	63	Qualification to Liguilla de Ascenso
5	Panteras Neza	30	13	8	9	52	43	+9	3	50	Qualification to Liguilla de Ascenso
6	Coyotes Neza	30	15	3	12	51	44	+7	2	50	Qualification to Liguilla de Ascenso
7	Academia América Leyendas	30	12	9	9	45	39	+6	4	49	
8	Academia Mineros CDMX	30	14	5	11	50	46	+4	1	48	
9	Irapuato Olimpo	30	13	3	14	41	63	−22	1	43	Qualification to Liguilla de Filiales
10	Halcones de Rayón	30	11	5	14	44	52	−8	2	40	
11	Domínguez Osos	30	8	9	13	48	64	−16	6	39	
12	Marina	30	8	6	16	43	64	−21	4	34	
13	Novillos Neza	30	8	5	17	47	70	−23	2	31	
14	Coyotes F.C.	30	8	4	18	28	49	−21	1	29	
15	Arietes	30	7	3	20	53	90	−37	2	26	
16	Cuemanco	30	2	2	26	18	86	−68	0	8	

Updated to match(es) played on 27 April 2025. Source: Liga TDP

== Group 6 ==
Group with 12 teams from Hidalgo, Michoacán and State of Mexico.

Location of teams in the 2024–25 Liga TDP Group 6

=== Teams ===
Team	City	Home ground	Capacity	Affiliate	Official name
Artesanos Metepec	Metepec, State of Mexico	La Hortaliza	2,000	Artesanos Metepec	–
Astilleros	Huixquilucan de Degollado, State of Mexico	Alberto Pérez Navarro	3,000	–	–
CID Leones Negros Toluca	Ixtlahuaca de Rayón, State of Mexico	Deportivo El Picoso	1,000	–	Grupo Sherwood
Cordobés	Huixquilucan de Degollado, State of Mexico	Alberto Pérez Navarro	3,000	Cordobés	–
Estudiantes	San Felipe del Progreso, State of Mexico	Margarito Esquivel	1,000	–	–
Eurosoccer	Toluca, State of Mexico	Unidad Deportiva San Antonio Buenavista	1,000	–	Deportivo Metepec
Leones Huixquilucan	Huixquilucan de Degollado, State of Mexico	Alberto Pérez Navarro	3,000	–	–
Luma Sports	Santa María Zolotepec, State of Mexico	Luma Sports	1,000	–	–
Orishas Tepeji	Tepeji, Hidalgo	Tepeji	2,000	–	–
Real San Luis	Metepec, State of Mexico	Jesús Lara	1,000	–	Fuerza Mazahua
Unión Campesinos	Cuautitlán, State of Mexico	La Virgen	1,000	–	–
Zitácuaro	Zitácuaro, Michoacán	Ignacio López Rayón	10,000	Zitácuaro	–

=== League table ===
Pos	Team	Pld	W	D	L	GF	GA	GD	BP	Pts	Qualification or relegation
1	Artesanos Metepec	22	17	4	1	47	11	+36	1	56	Qualification to Liguilla de Filiales
2	Estudiantes	22	14	6	2	55	23	+32	2	50	Qualification to Liguilla de Ascenso
3	Orishas Tepeji	22	13	4	5	71	34	+37	2	45	Qualification to Liguilla de Ascenso
4	Unión Campesinos	22	10	7	5	41	28	+13	5	42	Qualification to Liguilla de Ascenso
5	Cordobés	22	11	4	7	31	30	+1	4	41	
6	Zitácuaro	22	11	6	5	32	25	+7	1	40	Qualification to Liguilla de Filiales
7	Leones Huixquilucan	22	9	6	7	39	39	0	4	37	
8	Real San Luis	22	8	1	13	34	45	−11	1	26	
9	CID Leones Negros Toluca	22	4	6	12	15	32	−17	1	19	
10	Astilleros	22	5	2	15	17	34	−17	1	18	
11	Eurosoccer	22	4	1	17	24	48	−24	1	14	
12	Luma Sports	22	2	1	19	19	76	−57	1	8	

Updated to match(es) played on 27 April 2025. Source: Liga TDP

== Group 7 ==
Group with 13 teams from Guerrero, Mexico City, Morelos and State of Mexico.

=== Teams ===
Location of teams in the 2024–25 Liga TDP Group 7 (Mexico City and State of Mexico)
Location of teams in the 2024–25 Liga TDP Group 7 (Morelos)
Location of teams in the 2024–25 Liga TDP Group 7 (Guerrero)

Team	City	Home ground	Capacity	Affiliate	Official name
Águilas UAGro	Chilpancingo, Guerrero	UAGro	2,000	–	–
Alebrijes CDMX	Tlalpan, Mexico City	Colegio México	500	Alebrijes de Oaxaca	–
Arroceros Jojutla	Jojutla, Morelos	Unidad Deportiva La Perseverancia	1,000	–	Académicos Jojutla
Atlético Inter Capital	Benito Juárez, Mexico City	Centro Deportivo Benito Juárez	800	–	–
Atlético Real Morelos	Cuernavaca, Morelos	Deportivo La Lagunilla	1,000	–	–
Caudillos de Morelos	Emiliano Zapata, Morelos	General Emiliano Zapata	2,000	–	Caudillos de Morelos
Ciervos	Chalco, State of Mexico	Arreola	3,217	Ciervos	–
Escuela Necaxa Coyoacán	Milpa Alta, Mexico City	Momoxco	3,500	–	Colegio Once México
FORMAFUTINTEGRAL	Ixtapaluca, State of Mexico	Campo La Era	1,000	–	–
Iguala	Iguala, Guerrero	Unidad Deportiva Iguala	4,000	–	–
Selva Cañera	Zacatepec, Morelos	Agustín Coruco Díaz	24,313	Zacatepec	–
Tigres Yautepec	Yautepec, Morelos	Unidad Deportiva San Carlos	1,500	–	Atlético Cuernavaca
Zapata	Emiliano Zapata, Morelos	General Emiliano Zapata	2,000	–	Caudillos de Morelos

=== League table ===
Pos	Team	Pld	W	D	L	GF	GA	GD	BP	Pts	Qualification or relegation
1	Águilas UAGro	24	18	2	4	70	12	+58	1	57	Qualification to Liguilla de Ascenso
2	Tigres Yautepec	24	16	8	0	56	16	+40	1	57	Qualification to Liguilla de Ascenso
3	Atlético Real Morelos	24	16	5	3	60	22	+38	4	57	Qualification to Liguilla de Ascenso
4	Zapata	24	13	8	3	39	19	+20	4	51	
5	Selva Cañera	24	12	4	8	46	29	+17	3	43	
6	Atlético Inter Capital	24	13	1	10	39	30	+9	0	40	
7	Arroceros Jojutla	24	9	7	8	38	30	+8	4	38	
8	Iguala	24	10	0	14	36	54	−18	0	30	
9	Alebrijes CDMX	24	7	3	14	30	51	−21	1	25	Qualification to Liguilla de Filiales
10	FORMAFUTINTEGRAL	24	6	3	15	24	51	−27	2	23	
11	Ciervos	24	6	3	15	18	45	−27	2	23	
12	Caudillos de Morelos	24	2	6	16	16	41	−25	3	15	
13	Escuela Necaxa Coyoacán	24	2	2	20	24	96	−72	1	9	

Updated to match(es) played on 27 April 2025. Source: Liga TDP

== Group 8 ==
Group with 14 teams from Hidalgo, Mexico City, State of Mexico and Tlaxcala.

=== Teams ===
Location of teams in the 2024–25 Liga TDP Group 8 (Hidalgo)
Location of teams in the 2024–25 Liga TDP Group 8 (State of Mexico)
Location of teams in the 2024–25 Liga TDP Group 8 (Tlaxcala)

Team	City	Home ground	Capacity	Affiliate	Official name
Águilas de Teotitihuacán	San Martín de las Pirámides, State of Mexico	Deportivo Braulio Romero	1,000	–	–
Alebrijes Teotihuacán	San Juan Teotihuacán, State of Mexico	Centro Deportivo Pascual	1,000	Alebrijes de Oaxaca	–
Atlético Toltecas	Tula, Hidalgo	Parque Infantil La Tortuga	1,000	–	–
Balam	Venustiano Carranza, Mexico City	Deportivo Eduardo Molina	1,000	Faraones de Texcoco	–
Bombarderos de Tecámac	Tecámac, State of Mexico	Deportivo Sierra Hermosa	1,000	–	–
Deportivo JEM	Mazatecochco, Tlaxcala	San José del Agua	1,000	–	Unión Magdalena Contreras
Faraones de Texcoco	Chicoloapan de Juárez, State of Mexico	La Copalera	1,000	Faraones de Texcoco	–
Halcones Negros	Chicoloapan de Juárez, State of Mexico	Unidad Deportiva San José	1,000	–	–
Hidalguense	Pachuca, Hidalgo	Club Hidalguense	600	–	–
Lilo	San Juan Zitlaltepec, State of Mexico	San Juan Zitlaltepec	1,500	–	Matamoros
Lonsdaleíta	Pachuca, Hidalgo	Revolución Mexicana	3,500	–	–
Pachuca	San Agustín Tlaxiaca, Hidalgo	Universidad del Fútbol	1,000	Pachuca	–
Toros Tlaxco	Tlaxco, Tlaxcala	Nou Camp Maracaná	500	–	Atlético Tulancingo
Tuzos Pachuca	San Agustín Tlaxiaca, Hidalgo	Universidad del Fútbol	1,000	Pachuca	–

=== League table ===
Pos	Team	Pld	W	D	L	GF	GA	GD	BP	Pts	Qualification or relegation
1	Pachuca	26	20	4	2	84	24	+60	0	64	Qualification to Liguilla de Filiales
2	Bombarderos de Tecámac	26	18	6	2	51	21	+30	3	63	Qualification to Liguilla de Ascenso
3	Tuzos Pachuca	26	19	2	5	84	32	+52	1	60	Qualification to Liguilla de Ascenso
4	Halcones Negros	26	14	4	8	66	42	+24	3	49	Qualification to Liguilla de Ascenso
5	Balam	26	12	5	9	49	34	+15	4	45	Qualification to Liguilla de Filiales
6	Lilo	26	12	6	8	43	41	+2	3	45	
7	Hidalguense	26	13	3	10	35	29	+6	2	44	
8	Lonsdaleíta	26	11	5	10	53	45	+8	3	41	
9	Toros Tlaxco	26	11	2	13	57	45	+12	1	36	
10	Alebrijes Teotihuacán	26	7	4	15	26	40	−14	2	27	Qualification to Liguilla de Filiales
11	Atlético Toltecas	26	5	5	16	32	73	−41	1	21	
12	Deportivo JEM	26	3	5	18	28	72	−44	3	17	
13	Águilas de Teotihuacán	26	3	5	18	24	70	−46	3	17	
14	Faraones de Texcoco	26	5	2	19	37	101	−64	0	17	

Updated to match(es) played on 27 April 2025. Source: Liga TDP

== Group 9 ==
Group with 7 teams from Hidalgo, San Luis Potosí and Veracruz. On February 20, 2025 Tantoyuca F.C. and Venados de Misantla abandoned the season for sporting reasons.

=== Teams ===
Location of teams in the 2024–25 Liga TDP Group 9 (Hidalgo, Tampico and Veracruz)
Location of teams in the 2024–25 Liga TDP Group 9 (SLP)

Team	City	Home ground	Capacity	Affiliate	Official Name
Atlético Poza Rica	Poza Rica, Veracruz	18 de Marzo	2,000	–	Papanes de Papantla
Huastecos Axtla	Axtla de Terrazas, San Luis Potosí	Garzas Blancas	1,500	–	Guerreros Reynosa
Litcheros de Huehuetlán	Huehuetlán, San Luis Potosí	Unidad Deportiva 20 de Noviembre	1,000	–	Bucaneros de Matamoros
Manta Rayas	Tierra Blanca, Veracruz	La Masa	1,000	–	–
Orgullo Surtam	Tampico, Tamaulipas	Tamaulipas	19,667	–	–
Sultanes de Tamazunchale	Tamazunchale, San Luis Potosí	Unidad Deportiva Tamazunchale	2,000	–	–
Real Tlanchinol	Tlanchinol, Hidalgo	Unidad Deportiva Cruz Blanca	1,000	–	Atlético Huejutla

=== League table ===
Pos	Team	Pld	W	D	L	GF	GA	GD	BP	Pts	Qualification or relegation
1	Orgullo Surtam	22	17	1	4	49	17	+32	1	53	Qualification to Liguilla de Ascenso
2	Atlético Poza Rica	22	14	5	3	48	22	+26	2	49	Qualification to Liguilla de Ascenso
3	Huastecos Axtla	22	13	3	6	61	24	+37	2	44	Qualification to Liguilla de Ascenso
4	Litcheros de Huehuetlán	22	9	5	8	28	25	+3	1	33	
5	Sultanes de Tamazunchale	22	8	5	9	36	44	−8	4	33	
6	Real Tlanchinol	22	6	4	12	22	45	−23	1	23	
7	Manta Rayas	22	5	3	14	16	36	−20	1	19	
8	Tantoyuca	16	3	3	10	15	41	−26	1	13	Season abandoned
9	Venados de Misantla	16	1	5	10	22	43	−21	4	12	Season abandoned

Updated to match(es) played on 27 April 2025. Source: Liga TDP

== Group 10 ==
Group with 14 teams from Guanajuato and Querétaro.

Location of teams in the 2024–25 Liga TDP Group 10 (Guanajuato)
Location of teams in the 2024–25 Liga TDP Group 10 (Querétaro)

=== Teams ===
Team	City	Home ground	Capacity	Affiliate	Official name
AR Aquivaldo Mosquera	Santa Rosa, Querétaro	Parque Bicentenario	2,000	–	Cañada CTM
Celaya	Celaya, Guanajuato	Miguel Alemán Valdés	23,182	Celaya	–
Celaya Linces	Comonfort, Guanajuato	Brígido Vargas	4,000	–	–
Estudiantes de Querétaro	Querétaro, Querétaro	Hacienda Dolores	1,000	–	–
Fundadores El Marqués	Santa Rosa, Querétaro	Parque Bicentenario	2,000	–	–
Inter de Querétaro	Santa Rosa, Querétaro	Parque Bicentenario	2,000	–	–
Inter Guanajuato	Guanajuato City, Guanajuato	Arnulfo Vázquez Nieto	1,000	–	–
Inter Corregidora	Santa Rosa, Querétaro	Parque Bicentenario	2,000	–	Querétaro 3D
Leyendas	Guanajuato City, Guanajuato	Nieto Piña UG	1,000	–	Mayas Hunucmá
Lobos ITECA	Querétaro, Querétaro	Unidad Deportiva Reforma Lomas	1,000	–	–
Mineros Querétaro	Colón, Querétaro	Universidad CEICKOR	500	Mineros de Zacatecas	–
Oro La Piedad Querétaro	Querétaro, Querétaro	El Infiernillo	1,000	–	–
San Juan del Río	San Juan del Río, Querétaro	Unidad Deportiva Norte	1,000	–	–
Titanes de Querétaro	San José Iturbide, Guanajuato	Unidad Deportiva San José Iturbide	1,000	–	–

=== League table ===
Pos	Team	Pld	W	D	L	GF	GA	GD	BP	Pts	Qualification or relegation
1	Fundadores El Marqués	26	21	2	3	60	15	+45	2	67	Qualification to Liguilla de Ascenso
2	Titanes de Querétaro	26	21	0	5	76	19	+57	0	63	Qualification to Liguilla de Ascenso
3	Celaya Linces	26	17	3	6	52	25	+27	2	56	Qualification to Liguilla de Ascenso
4	Celaya	26	14	7	5	62	22	+40	3	52	Qualification to Liguilla de Filiales
5	Inter Guanajuato	26	15	3	8	56	24	+32	2	50	Qualification to Liguilla de Filiales
6	Oro La Piedad Querétaro	26	14	4	8	60	41	+19	2	48	Qualification to Liguilla de Ascenso
7	Inter Corregidora	26	11	7	8	37	26	+11	4	44	
8	Mineros Querétaro	26	11	5	10	30	34	−4	1	39	
9	Leyendas	26	11	2	13	40	50	−10	1	36	
10	Estudiantes de Querétaro	26	8	7	11	37	39	−2	2	33	
11	Lobos ITECA	26	6	5	15	19	63	−44	2	25	
12	San Juan del Río	26	5	3	18	30	67	−37	3	21	
13	AR Aquivaldo Mosquera	26	2	3	21	16	62	−46	1	10	
14	Inter de Querétaro	26	0	1	25	6	94	−88	1	2	

Updated to match(es) played on 27 April 2025. Source: Liga TDP

== Group 11 ==
Group with 10 teams from Guanajuato and Michoacán.

=== Teams ===
Location of teams in the 2024–25 Liga TDP Group 11

Team	City	Home ground	Capacity	Affiliate	Official name
Atlético Morelia – Universidad Michoacana	Morelia, Michoacán	Universitario UMSNH	5,000	Atlético Morelia	–
Atlético Valladolid	Morelia, Michoacán	Complejo Deportivo Bicentenario	1,000	–	–
Bucaneros	Maravatío, Michoacán	Unidad Deportiva Melchor Ocampo	1,000	–	–
Delfines de Abasolo	Abasolo, Guanajuato	Municipal de Abasolo	2,500	–	–
Deportivo Sahuayo	Sahuayo, Michoacán	Unidad Deportiva Francisco García Vilchis	1,500	–	Michoacán F.C.
Deportivo Zamora	Zamora, Michoacán	Unidad Deportiva El Chamizal	5,000	–	–
Furia Azul	Pátzcuaro, Michoacán	Furia Azul	3,000	–	–
H2O Purépechas	Morelia, Michoacán	Cancha 15 Policía y Tránsito	1,000	Atlético Morelia	–
Halcones AFU	Uruapan, Michoacán	Unidad Deportiva Hermanos López Rayón	6,000	Halcones	Halcones
La Piedad Imperial	La Piedad, Michoacán	Club Azteca	1,000	–	–

=== League table ===
Pos	Team	Pld	W	D	L	GF	GA	GD	BP	Pts	Qualification or relegation
1	Deportivo Zamora	27	21	3	3	64	15	+49	3	69	Qualification to Liguilla de Ascenso
2	Halcones AFU	27	17	6	4	66	21	+45	5	62	Qualification to Liguilla de Filiales
3	Atlético Morelia – Universidad Michoacana	27	17	6	4	66	23	+43	1	58	Qualification to Liguilla de Filiales
4	Deportivo Sahuayo	27	13	6	8	52	39	+13	3	48	Qualification to Liguilla de Ascenso
5	H2O Purépechas	27	12	7	8	40	38	+2	5	48	Qualification to Liguilla de Ascenso
6	La Piedad Imperial	27	10	5	12	47	41	+6	3	38	
7	Bucaneros	27	7	6	14	40	59	−19	1	28	
8	Furia Azul	27	5	8	14	31	71	−40	4	27	
9	Delfines de Abasolo	27	7	3	17	40	55	−15	0	24	
10	Atlético Valladolid	27	0	2	25	13	97	−84	1	3	

Updated to match(es) played on 27 April 2025. Source: Liga TDP

== Group 12 ==
Group with 15 teams from Aguascalientes, Guanajuato, Jalisco, San Luis Potosí and Zacatecas.

=== Teams ===
Location of teams in the 2024–25 Liga TDP Group 12 (Guanajuato and Jalisco)
Location of teams in the 2024–25 Liga TDP Group 12 (Aguascalientes and Zacatecas)

Team	City	Home ground	Capacity	Affiliate	Official name
Atlético ECCA	León, Guanajuato	CODE Las Joyas	1,000	–	–
Atlético Leonés	León, Guanajuato	CODE Las Joyas	1,000	–	–
Cachorros de León	León, Guanajuato	CODE Las Joyas	1,000	–	Fut-Car
Empresarios del Rincón	Purísima del Rincón, Guanajuato	Unidad Deportiva de Purísima	1,000	–	Real Olmeca Sport
Irapuato	Irapuato, Guanajuato	Sergio León Chávez	20,000	Irapuato	–
León GEN	Lagos de Moreno, Jalisco	La Esmeralda Club León	2,000	León	–
Leyendas Unidas	León, Guanajuato	Parque Metropolitano	500	–	Jaral del Progreso
Magos del Rincón	Purísima del Rincón, Guanajuato	Unidad Deportiva de Purísima	1,000	–	–
Mineros de Zacatecas	Zacatecas, Zacatecas	Unidad Deportiva Guadalupe	1,000	Mineros de Zacatecas	–
Necaxa	Aguascalientes, Aguascalientes	Casa Club Necaxa	1,000	Necaxa	–
Pabellón	Aguascalientes, Aguascalientes	Ferrocarrilero	2,000	–	–
Potosinos	San Luis Potosí, San Luis Potosí	Unidad Deportiva Adolfo López Mateos	1,000	–	–
Santa Ana del Conde	Santa Ana del Conde, Guanajuato	El Roble	500	–	Real Magari
Suré	León, Guanajuato	CODE Las Joyas	1,000	–	–
Tuzos UAZ	Zacatecas, Zacatecas	Universitario Unidad Deportiva Norte	5,000	Tuzos UAZ	–

=== League table ===
Pos	Team	Pld	W	D	L	GF	GA	GD	BP	Pts	Qualification or relegation
1	Mineros de Zacatecas	28	22	4	2	70	20	+50	2	72	Qualification to Liguilla de Filiales
2	Potosinos	28	21	1	6	54	27	+27	1	65	Qualification to Liguilla de Ascenso
3	Irapuato	28	20	2	6	85	26	+59	2	64	Qualification to Liguilla de Filiales
4	Atlético Leonés	28	20	2	6	75	24	+51	1	63	Qualification to Liguilla de Ascenso
5	Magos del Rincón	28	17	6	5	66	28	+38	6	63	Qualification to Liguilla de Ascenso
6	Necaxa	28	14	5	9	57	37	+20	3	50	Qualification to Liguilla de Filiales
7	Santa Ana del Conde	28	14	5	9	50	43	+7	3	50	Qualification to Liguilla de Ascenso
8	Tuzos UAZ	28	12	5	11	38	37	+1	1	42	
9	Cachorros de León	28	13	2	13	39	40	−1	1	42	
10	Atlético ECCA	28	8	2	18	26	41	−15	1	27	
11	Pabellón	28	6	8	14	37	53	−16	1	27	
12	Leyendas Unidas	28	4	6	18	22	66	−44	3	21	
13	León GEN	28	4	4	20	32	61	−29	3	19	
14	Suré	28	4	2	22	18	85	−67	1	15	
15	Empresarios del Rincón	28	3	2	23	21	102	−81	0	11	

Updated to match(es) played on 27 April 2025. Source: Liga TDP

== Group 13 ==
Group with 12 teams from Jalisco.

=== Teams ===
Location of teams in the 2024–25 Liga TDP Group 13

Team	City	Home ground	Capacity	Affiliate	Official name
Acatlán	Zapotlanejo, Jalisco	Miguel Hidalgo	1,700	Acatlán	–
Agaveros	Tlajomulco de Zúñiga, Jalisco	Deportivo del Valle	1,000	–	–
Alfareros de Tonalá	Tonalá, Jalisco	Deportivo Jalisciense	1,000	–	–
Aves Blancas	Tepatitlán de Morelos, Jalisco	Corredor Industrial	1,200	–	–
Elite Azteca	Zapopan, Jalisco	Centro de Alto Rendimiento Tapatíos	1,000	–	Pro Camp
Gorilas de Juanacatlán	Juanacatlán, Jalisco	Club Juanacatlán	500	–	–
Leones Negros UdeG	Zapopan, Jalisco	Club Deportivo U. de G.	3,000	Leones Negros UdeG	–
Nacional	Tlaquepaque, Jalisco	Unidad Deportiva Froc	1,000	–	–
Salamanca	Tepatitlán de Morelos, Jalisco	Gregorio "Tepa" Gómez	8,085	Salamanca CF UDS	–
Tapatíos Soccer	Zapopan, Jalisco	Centro de Alto Rendimiento Tapatíos	1,000	–	–
Tecos	Zapopan, Jalisco	Cancha Anexa Tres de Marzo	1,000	Tecos	–
Tepatitlán	Tepatitlán de Morelos, Jalisco	Gregorio "Tepa" Gómez	8,085	Tepatitlán	–

=== League table ===
Pos	Team	Pld	W	D	L	GF	GA	GD	BP	Pts	Qualification or relegation
1	Gorilas de Juanacatlán	22	16	3	3	52	16	+36	2	53	Qualification to Liguilla de Ascenso
2	Tecos	22	15	6	1	48	13	+35	2	53	Qualification to Liguilla de Filiales
3	Acatlán	22	12	8	2	34	11	+23	6	50	Qualification to Liguilla de Filiales
4	Tapatíos Soccer	22	14	5	3	41	13	+28	2	49	Qualification to Liguilla de Ascenso
5	Elite Azteca	22	13	1	8	54	35	+19	0	40	Qualification to Liguilla de Ascenso
6	Aves Blancas	22	9	5	8	23	28	−5	4	36	
7	Leones Negros UdeG	22	11	1	10	31	26	+5	1	35	Qualification to Liguilla de Filiales
8	Tepatitlán	22	6	5	11	18	32	−14	1	24	
9	Salamanca	22	6	3	13	23	63	−40	2	23	
10	Agaveros	22	3	5	14	15	51	−36	3	17	
11	Nacional	22	2	3	17	15	47	−32	1	10	
12	Alfareros de Tonalá	22	0	5	17	8	27	−19	1	6	

Updated to match(es) played on 27 April 2025. Source: Liga TDP

== Group 14 ==
Group with 14 teams from Colima and Jalisco.

=== Teams ===
Location of teams in the 2024–25 Liga TDP Group 14

Team	City	Home ground	Capacity	Affiliate	Official name
Catedráticos Elite	Etzatlán, Jalisco	Unidad Deportiva Etzatlán	1,000	Petroleros de Salamanca	–
Charales de Chapala	Chapala, Jalisco	Municipal Juan Rayo	1,200	–	–
Deportivo Fuerza Huracán	San Isidro Mazatepec, Jalisco	La Fortaleza	1,000	–	Fénix CFAR
Deportivo Tala	Tala, Jalisco	Centro Deportivo Cultural 24 de Marzo	2,000	–	Volcanes de Colima
Diablos Tesistán	Zapopan, Jalisco	Club Diablos Tesistán	1,000	–	–
Guardianes GDL	Zapopan, Jalisco	Centro de Alto Rendimiento Tapatíos	1,000	–	Aviña
Guerreros de Autlán	Autlán, Jalisco	Unidad Deportiva Chapultepec	1,500	–	–
Legado del Centenario	Guadalajara, Jalisco	Unidad Deportiva Cuauhtémoc	1,000	–	–
LEVET	Zapopan, Jalisco	Club Pumas Tesistán	1,000	–	Gallos Viejos
Oro	Puerto Vallarta, Jalisco	Municipal Agustín Flores Contreras	2,000	–	–
Osos Deportivo CMG	Zapopan, Jalisco	Deportivo Corona	1,000	–	Deportivo Cimagol
Real Ánimas de Sayula	Sayula, Jalisco	Gustavo Díaz Ordaz	4,000	–	–
Tornados Tlaquepaque	Tlaquepaque, Jalisco	Club Maracaná	500	–	Caja Oblatos
Ynjer Cuauhtémoc	Cuauhtémoc, Colima	Unidad Deportiva Cuauhtémoc	1,000	Acatlán	Acatlán Cuauhtémoc

=== League table ===
Pos	Team	Pld	W	D	L	GF	GA	GD	BP	Pts	Qualification or relegation
1	Guerreros de Autlán	26	21	5	0	92	17	+75	4	72	Qualification to Liguilla de Ascenso
2	Diablos Tesistán	26	20	2	4	90	21	+69	1	63	Qualification to Liguilla de Ascenso
3	Deportivo Tala	26	16	7	3	60	28	+32	2	57	Qualification to Liguilla de Ascenso
4	Legado del Centenario	26	13	2	11	47	34	+13	0	41	Qualification to Liguilla de Ascenso
5	Charales de Chapala	26	10	8	8	34	29	+5	3	41	Qualification to Liguilla de Ascenso
6	Tornados Tlaquepaque	26	9	8	9	39	40	−1	6	41	Qualification to Liguilla de Filiales
7	Deportivo Fuerza Huracán	26	10	4	12	40	48	−8	2	36	
8	Real Ánimas de Sayula	26	10	3	13	36	48	−12	2	35	
9	Ynjer Cuauhtémoc	26	7	9	10	34	45	−11	3	33	
10	Guardianes GDL	26	7	7	12	29	48	−19	5	33	
11	LEVET	26	9	2	15	33	32	+1	1	30	
12	Oro	26	5	5	16	25	67	−42	3	23	
13	Catedráticos Elite	26	6	2	18	21	83	−62	0	20	
14	Osos Deportivo CMG	26	5	4	17	31	71	−40	2	21	

Updated to match(es) played on 27 April 2025. Source: Liga TDP

== Group 15 ==
Group with 10 teams from Jalisco and Nayarit. The group originally had 11 teams, however on October 30, 2024 Dorados de Sinaloa abandoned the season due to security problems in the State of Sinaloa, which affected the team's operations.

=== Teams ===
Location of teams in the 2024–25 Liga TDP Group 15

Team	City	Home ground	Capacity	Affiliate	Official name
Atlético Acaponeta	Acaponeta, Nayarit	Unidad Deportiva Acaponeta	1,000	–	–
Atlético Nayarit	Tepic, Nayarit	Unidad Deportiva Sufacen	1,000	–	–
Atlético Punto Sur	Tlajomulco, Jalisco	Campo Punto Sur	500	–	AFAR Manzanillo
Atlético Tesistán	Zapopan, Jalisco	Club Pumas Tesistán	500	–	Guaymas
Halcones de Nayarit	Tepic, Nayarit	Halcones	1,000	–	–
Moncaro	Tequila, Jalisco	Unidad Deportiva 24 de Enero	1,000	–	–
Puerto Vallarta	Ixtapa, Jalisco	Ejidal La Preciosa	2,000	–	–
Sporting AKD	Zapopan, Jalisco	Deportivo Solares	1,000	–	Castores Gobrantacto
Tigres de Álica	Tepic, Nayarit	Nicolás Álvarez Ortega	12,271	Tigres de Álica	–
Xalisco	Xalisco, Nayarit	Unidad Deportiva Landareñas	1,500	–	–

=== League table ===
Pos	Team	Pld	W	D	L	GF	GA	GD	BP	Pts	Qualification or relegation
1	Tigres de Alica	27	21	5	1	47	15	+32	4	72	Qualification to Liguilla de Filiales
2	Xalisco	27	20	3	4	55	20	+35	1	64	Qualification to Liguilla de Ascenso
3	Atlético Acaponeta	27	14	6	7	55	38	+17	4	52	Qualification to Liguilla de Filiales
4	Sporting AKD	27	13	4	10	37	32	+5	1	44	Qualification to Liguilla de Ascenso
5	Atlético Nayarit	27	10	7	10	27	26	+1	4	41	
6	Atlético Tesistán	27	8	6	13	38	38	0	3	33	Qualification to Liguilla de Ascenso
7	Puerto Vallarta	27	8	6	13	30	42	−12	2	32	
8	Moncaro	27	7	5	15	35	60	−25	2	28	
9	Halcones de Nayarit	27	5	4	18	22	47	−25	1	20	
10	Atlético Punto Sur	27	2	8	17	21	49	−28	5	19	

Updated to match(es) played on 27 April 2025. Source: Liga TDP

== Group 16 ==
Group with 14 teams from Coahuila, Durango, Nuevo León and Tamaulipas.

=== Teams ===
Location of teams in the 2024–25 Liga TDP Group 16 (Nuevo León)
Location of teams in the 2024–25 Liga TDP Group 16 (Coahuila and Durango)
Location of teams in the 2024–25 Liga TDP Group 16 (Tamaulipas)

Team	City	Home ground	Capacity	Affiliate	Official name
Cadereyta	Cadereyta, Nuevo León	Clemente Salinas Netro	1,000	–	–
Calor Torreón	Gómez Palacio, Durango	Unidad Deportiva Francisco Gómez Palacio	4,000	Calor	–
Correcaminos UAT	Ciudad Victoria, Tamaulipas	Professor Eugenio Alvizo Porras	5,000	Correcaminos UAT	–
Escobedo	General Escobedo, Nuevo León	Deportivo Lázaro Cárdenas	1,000	–	Real San Cosme
Gallos Nuevo León	Monterrey, Nuevo León	Ciudad Deportiva Churubusco	1,000	–	–
Gavilanes de Matamoros	Matamoros, Tamaulipas	El Hogar	22,000	Gavilanes de Matamoros	Ho Gar H. Matamoros
Halcones de Saltillo	Saltillo, Coahuila	Olímpico Francisco I. Madero	7,000	–	San Isidro Laguna
Irritilas	San Pedro, Coahuila	Quinta Ximena	1,000	–	–
Leones de Nuevo León	General Escobedo, Nuevo León	Unidad Deportiva Monterrey 400	1,000	–	Campeche F.C.
Nuevo León	San Nicolás de los Garza, Nuevo León	Unidad Deportiva Oriente	1,000	–	–
Real Apodaca	Apodaca, Nuevo León	Centenario del Ejército Mexicano	2,000	Real Apodaca	–
Saltillo Soccer	Saltillo, Coahuila	Olímpico Francisco I. Madero	7,000	–	–
San Pedro 7–10	San Pedro Garza García, Nuevo León	Sporti Valle Poniente	500	–	–
Santiago	Santiago, Nuevo León	FCD El Barrial	1,300	Santiago	–

=== League table ===
Pos	Team	Pld	W	D	L	GF	GA	GD	BP	Pts	Qualification or relegation
1	Irritilas	26	16	8	2	57	28	+29	6	62	Qualification to Liguilla de Ascenso
2	Cadereyta	26	16	8	2	63	18	+45	4	60	Qualification to Liguilla de Ascenso
3	Correcaminos UAT	26	16	7	3	54	26	+28	4	59	Qualification to Liguilla de Filiales
4	Santiago	26	16	6	4	41	20	+21	3	57	Qualification to Liguilla de Ascenso
5	Calor Torreón	26	13	8	5	43	22	+21	7	54	Qualification to Liguilla de Filiales
6	Gallos Nuevo León	26	16	1	9	49	34	+15	0	49	Qualification to Liguilla de Ascenso
7	Gavilanes de Matamoros	26	12	9	5	37	19	+18	3	48	
8	Saltillo Soccer	26	11	8	7	54	36	+18	3	44	
9	Halcones de Saltillo	26	13	3	10	53	41	+12	1	43	
10	Nuevo León	26	6	4	16	39	51	−12	1	23	
11	Escobedo	26	5	4	17	28	57	−29	1	20	
12	Leones de Nuevo León	26	3	1	22	24	70	−46	0	10	
13	San Pedro 7–10	26	3	0	23	16	71	−55	0	9	
14	Real Apodaca	26	1	3	22	30	95	−65	2	8	

Updated to match(es) played on 16 April 2025. Source: Liga TDP

== Group 17 ==
Group with 11 teams from Baja California, Chihuahua and Sonora.

=== Teams ===
Location of teams in the 2024–25 Liga TDP Group 17

Team	City	Home ground	Capacity	Affiliate	Official name
Atlético Tijuana	Tijuana, Baja California	Unidad Deportiva Reforma	1,000	–	–
Búhos UNISON	Hermosillo, Sonora	Miguel Castro Servín	4,000	–	–
Cachanillas	Mexicali, Baja California	Eduardo "Boticas" Pérez	2,000	–	–
CEPROFFA	Ciudad Juárez, Chihuahua	CEPROFFA	1,000	–	–
Cimarrones de Sonora	Hermosillo, Sonora	Unidad Deportiva La Milla	1,000	Cimarrones de Sonora	–
Cobras Fut Premier	Ciudad Juárez, Chihuahua	Complejo Temop Axis	500	–	–
Datileros de San Luis RC	San Luis Río Colorado, Sonora	El Musical	1,000	–	–
Etchojoa	Etchojoa, Sonora	Trigueros	1,500	–	–
La Tribu de Ciudad Juárez	Ciudad Juárez, Chihuahua	Complejo La Tribu	500	–	–
Obson Dynamo	Ciudad Obregón, Sonora	Hundido ITSON	3,000	–	–
Xolos Hermosillo	Hermosillo, Sonora	Cancha Aarón Gamal Aguirre Fimbres	1,000	Tijuana	–

=== League table ===
Pos	Team	Pld	W	D	L	GF	GA	GD	BP	Pts	Qualification or relegation
1	Etchojoa	20	15	0	5	36	11	+25	0	45	Qualification to Liguilla de Ascenso
2	Cimarrones de Sonora	20	12	6	2	38	19	+19	1	43	Qualification to Liguilla de Filiales
3	La Tribu de Ciudad Juárez	20	9	5	6	26	17	+9	4	36	Qualification to Liguilla de Ascenso
4	Datileros de San Luis RC	20	10	3	7	44	35	+9	2	35	Qualification to Liguilla de Ascenso
5	Obson Dynamo	20	10	2	8	25	27	−2	2	34	
6	Cachanillas	20	8	4	8	33	33	0	2	30	
7	CEPROFFA	20	8	4	8	27	33	−6	2	30	
8	Xolos Hermosillo	20	7	4	9	31	38	−7	2	27	
9	Atlético Tijuana	20	5	5	10	33	38	−5	4	24	
10	Búhos UNISON	20	4	2	14	31	49	−18	0	14	
11	Cobras Fut Premier	20	3	3	14	25	49	−24	0	12	

Updated to match(es) played on 20 April 2025. Source: Liga TDP

== Promotion Play–offs ==
The Promotion Play–offs will consist of seven phases. Classify 64 teams, the number varies according to the number of teams in each group, being between three and eight clubs per group. The country will be divided into two zones: South Zone (Groups 1 to 8) and North Zone (Groups 9 to 17). Eliminations will be held according to the average obtained by each team, being ordered from best to worst by their percentage throughout the season.

As of 2020–21 season, the names of the knockout stages were modified as follows: Round of 32, Round of 16, Quarter-finals, Semifinals, Zone Final and Final, this as a consequence of the division of the country into two zones, for so the teams only face clubs from the same region until the final series.

=== Round of 32 ===
The first legs were played on 30 April and 1 May, and the second legs were played on 3 and 4 May 2025.

==== South Zone ====
Team 1	Agg.	Team 2	1st leg	2nd leg
Muxes	6–0	Coyotes Neza	2–0	4–0
Dragones de Oaxaca	7–0	Panteras Neza	4–0	3–0
Águila Azteca	6–1	Independiente Mexiquense	1–1	5–0
Héroes de Zaci	7–2	Licántropos	4–1	3–1
Ecatepec	2–2 (2–4)	(p) Pioneros Junior	1–2	1–0
Delfines UGM	2–5	Halcones Negros	0–2	2–3
Delfines de Coatzacoalcos	5–1	Córdoba	3–1	2–0
Bombarderos de Tecámac	5–2	Unión Campesinos	2–2	3–0
Tigres Yautepec	1–1 (4–5)	(p) Corsarios de Campeche	1–1	0–0
Águilas UAGro	1–2	Académicos UGM	0–2	1–0
Atlético Real Morelos	5–2	Álamos	1–0	4–2
Tuzos Pachuca	4–5	Orishas Tepeji	2–3	2–2
Estudiantes del COBACH	7–0	Valle de Xico	3–0	4–0
PDLA	5–4	Tapachula Soconusco	3–2	2–2
Estudiantes	4–3	Ejidatarios de Bonfil	1–2	3–1
Politécnico	2–1	Oceanía	1–0	1–1

==== North Zone ====
Team 1	Agg.	Team 2	1st leg	2nd leg
Guerreros de Autlán	3–1	Atlético Tesistán	0–0	3–1
Fundadores	3–4	Charales de Chapala	0–2	3–2
Deportivo Zamora	2–1	Legado del Centenario	1–1	1–0
Diablos Tesistán	5–0	Sporting AKD	3–0	2–0
Titanes de Querétaro	5–3	Datileros de San Luis RC	3–2	2–1
Gorilas de Juanacatlán	3–2	H2O Purépechas	0–1	3–1
Orgullo Surtam	3–5	Deportivo Sahuayo	1–3	2–2
Irritilas	3–1	Santa Ana del Conde	1–0	2–1
Xalisco	3–1	La Tribu de Ciudad Juárez	1–1	2–0
Potosinos	2–1	Elite Azteca	0–0	2–1
Cadereyta	3–2	Oro La Piedad Querétaro	2–0	1–2
Atlético Leonés	4–2	Gallos Nuevo León	1–1	3–1
Magos del Rincón	3–0	Huastecos Axtla	0–0	3–0
Etchojoa	7–1	Celaya Linces	2–1	5–0
Tapatíos Soccer (p)	1–1 (3–1)	Santiago	1–1	0–0
Atlético Poza Rica	1–1 (3–4)	(p) Deportivo Tala	0–1	1–0

=== Round of 16 ===
The first legs were played on 7 and 8 May, and the second legs were played on 10 and 11 May 2025.

==== South Zone ====
Team 1	Agg.	Team 2	1st leg	2nd leg
Muxes	4–0	Pioneros Junior	2–0	2–0
Dragones de Oaxaca (p)	2–2 (3–1)	Halcones Negros	1–1	1–1
Águila Azteca	4–0	Corsarios de Campeche	2–0	2–0
Héroes de Zaci	4–2	Académicos UGM	1–2	3–0
Delfines de Coatzacoalcos	3–2	Orishas Tepeji	1–2	2–0
Bombarderos de Tecámac	3–2	Politécnico	2–2	1–0
Atlético Real Morelos (p)	3–3 (8–7)	Estudiantes	1–1	2–2
Estudiantes del COBACH	3–2	PDLA	1–1	2–1

==== North Zone ====
Team 1	Agg.	Team 2	1st leg	2nd leg
Guerreros de Autlán	5–1	Charales de Chapala	2–0	3–1
Deportivo Zamora	4–1	Deportivo Sahuayo	1–1	3–0
Diablos Tesistán	5–1	Deportivo Tala	3–0	2–1
Titanes de Querétaro	2–2 (4–5)	(p) Tapatíos Soccer	0–1	2–1
Gorilas de Juanacatlán	3–2	Etchojoa	0–1	3–1
Irritilas	3–2	Magos del Rincón	1–1	2–1
Xalisco	0–1	Atlético Leonés	0–1	0–0
Potosinos	0–4	Cadereyta	0–3	0–1

=== Final stage ===
Zone Quarter–finals
2S	Dragones de Oaxaca	2	0	2
7S	Atlético Real Morelos	0	0	0
1S	Muxes	0	0	0
8S	Estudiantes del COBACH	0	3	3
4S	Héroes de Zaci	1	2	3
5S	Delfines de Coatzacoalcos	1	0	1
3S	Águila Azteca	2	0	2
6S	Bombarderos de Tecámac	3	2	5
1N	Guerreros de Autlán	1	1	2
8N	Tapatíos Soccer	0	0	0
3N	Diablos Tesistán	0	2	2 (4)
6N	Cadereyta (p)	2	0	2 (5)
2N	Deportivo Zamora (p)	0	1	1 (4)
7N	Atlético Leonés	0	1	1 (2)
4N	Gorilas de Juanacatlán	0	4	4
5N	Irritilas	2	1	3

Zone Semi–finals
2S	Dragones de Oaxaca	1	2	3
8S	Estudiantes del COBACH	1	0	1
4S	Héroes de Zaci	1	3	4
6S	Bombarderos de Tecámac	0	1	1
1N	Guerreros de Autlán	1	3	4
6N	Cadereyta	2	0	2
2N	Deportivo Zamora	1	3	4 (8)
4N	Gorilas de Juanacatlán (p)	3	1	4 (9)

Zone Finals
2S	Dragones de Oaxaca	0	0	0
4S	Héroes de Zaci	2	0	2
1N	Guerreros de Autlán	2	1	3
4N	Gorilas de Juanacatlán	1	1	2

National Final
4S	Héroes de Zaci	2
1N	Guerreros de Autlán	0

==== Zone Quarter–finals ====
The first legs were played on 14 and 15 May, and the second legs were played on 17 and 18 May 2025.

Team 1	Agg.	Team 2	1st leg	2nd leg
Muxes	0–3	Estudiantes del COBACH	0–0	0–3
Dragones de Oaxaca	2–0	Atlético Real Morelos	2–0	0–0
Águila Azteca	2–5	Bombarderos de Tecámac	2–3	0–2
Héroes de Zaci	3–1	Delfines de Coatzacoalcos	1–1	2–0
Guerreros de Autlán	2–0	Tapatíos Soccer	1–0	1–0
Deportivo Zamora (p)	1–1 (4–2)	Atlético Leonés	0–0	1–1
Diablos Tesistán	2–2 (4–5)	(p) Cadereyta	0–2	2–0
Gorilas de Juanacatlán	4–3	Irritilas	0–2	4–1

Matches

14 May 2025
15:00 CST (UTC−6)

Estudiantes del COBACH	0–0	Muxes
	Report

Estadio Flor de Sospó, Tuxtla Gutiérrez
Referee: Luis Alberto Nieto Reyes
17 May 2025
17:00 CST (UTC−6)

Muxes	0–3	Estudiantes del COBACH
	Report	López 78'; Cruz 80'; Ballinas 81'

Deportivo Lázaro Cárdenas, Mexico City
Referee: Luis Ángel Cabrera Carbajal

Estudiantes del COBACH won 0–3 on aggregate.

14 May 2025
16:00 CST (UTC−6)

Atlético Real Morelos	0–2	Dragones de Oaxaca
	Report	Alva 47'; Romero 61'

Deportivo La Lagunilla, Cuernavaca
Referee: Gerardo Abraham García Armendaris
17 May 2025
16:00 CST (UTC−6)

Dragones de Oaxaca	0–0	Atlético Real Morelos
	Report

Polideportivo Ignacio Mejía, Zimatlán de Álvarez
Referee: Jonatan Abdiel Romero Olivares

Dragones de Oaxaca won 2–0 on aggregate.

14 May 2025
16:00 CST (UTC−6)

Bombarderos de Tecámac	3–2	Águila Azteca
Silva 14'; Barrera 29'; Cervantes 46'	Report	Martínez 27'; Ortega 40'

Deportivo Sierra Hermosa, Tecámac
Referee: Andrés Ángel García Reyes
17 May 2025
15:00 CST (UTC−6)

Águila Azteca	0–2	Bombarderos de Tecámac
	Report	Barrera 17'; Alarcón 36'

Estadio El Mariscal, Chocamán
Referee: Edwin Alejandro Marín Luna

Bombarderos de Tecámac won 2–5 on aggregate.

15 May 2025
16:00 CST (UTC−6)

Delfines de Coatzacoalcos	1–1	Héroes de Zaci
Aguilar 15'	Report	Hernández 10'

Estadio Rafael Hernández Ochoa, Coatzacoalcos
Referee: Jonatan Alessandro Echeverría Santana
18 May 2025
16:00 CST (UTC−6)

Héroes de Zaci	2–0	Delfines de Coatzacoalcos
Serna 38'; Hernández 55'	Report

Deportivo Lázaro Cárdenas, Mexico City
Referee: José Cristian González Vizcaíno

Héroes de Zaci won 3–1 on aggregate.

15 May 2025
16:00 CST (UTC−6)

Tapatíos Soccer	0–1	Guerreros de Autlán
	Report	Robles 20'

Centro de Alto Rendimiento Tapatíos, Zapopan
Referee: Jaime Gustavo Saldaña Lerma
18 May 2025
16:00 CST (UTC−6)

Guerreros de Autlán	1–0	Tapatíos Soccer
Robles 89'	Report

Unidad Deportiva Chapultepec, Autlán
Referee: Mauricio Roque Trejo

Guerreros de Autlán won 2–0 on aggregate.

14 May 2025
11:00 CST (UTC−6)

Atlético Leonés	0–0	Deportivo Zamora
	Report

CODE Las Joyas, León
Referee: Víctor Alexis Rosas Hernández
17 May 2025
19:00 CST (UTC−6)

Deportivo Zamora	1–1	Atlético Leonés
Cortés 8'	Report	Razo 86'
Penalties
	4–2

Unidad Deportiva El Chamizal, Zamora
Referee: José Carlos Meléndez Cansino

1–1 on aggregate. Deportivo Zamora won 4–2 on the Penalty shoot-out

14 May 2025
20:00 CST (UTC−6)

Cadereyta	2–0	Diablos Tesistán
Miranda 23'; Riverea 29'	Report

Estadio Clemente Salinas Netro, Cadereyta
Referee: Ángel Efrén Sotelo Centeno
17 May 2025
16:00 CST (UTC−6)

Diablos Tesistán	2–0	Cadereyta
Rojas 45+2' (pen.); Flores 45+3'	Report
Penalties
	4–5

Deportivo Diablos Tesistán, Zapopan
Referee: Axelle Daniel Hernández Pérez

2–2 on aggregate. Cadereyta won 4–5 on the Penalty shoot-out

14 May 2025
16:00 CST (UTC−6)

Irritilas	2–0	Gorilas de Juanacatlán
Castorena 84'; Salas 90'	Report

Quinta Ximena, San Pedro de las Colonias
Referee: Israel De Jesús Mejía Torres
17 May 2025
19:30 CST (UTC−6)

Gorilas de Juanacatlán	4–1	Irritilas
Rodríguez 16', 77'; Jáuregui 43'; García 65'	Report	Cano 83'

Club Juanacatlán, Juanacatlán
Referee: Enrique Hernández Jaimes

Gorilas de Juanacatlán won 4–3 on aggregate.

==== Zone Semi–finals ====
The first legs were played on 21 and 22 May, and the second legs were played on 24 and 25 May 2025.

Team 1	Agg.	Team 2	1st leg	2nd leg
Dragones de Oaxaca	3–1	Estudiantes del COBACH	1–1	2–0
Héroes de Zaci	4–1	Bombarderos de Tecámac	1–0	3–1
Guerreros de Autlán	4–2	Cadereyta	1–2	3–0
Deportivo Zamora	4–4 (8–9)	(p) Gorilas de Juanacatlán	1–3	3–1

Matches

21 May 2025
15:00 CST (UTC−6)

Estudiantes del COBACH	1–1	Dragones de Oaxaca
Cabrera 87'	Report	Ayuzo 20'

Estadio Flor de Sospó, Tuxtla Gutiérrez
Referee: José Carlos Meléndez Cansino
24 May 2025
16:00 CST (UTC−6)

Dragones de Oaxaca	2–0	Estudiantes del COBACH
Romero 35'; Alva 60'	Report

Polideportivo Ignacio Mejía, Zimatlán de Álvarez
Referee: Mauricio Roque Trejo

Dragones de Oaxaca won 3–1 on aggregate.

22 May 2025
16:00 CST (UTC−6)

Bombarderos de Tecámac	0–1	Héroes de Zaci
	Report	Barojas 42'

Deportivo Sierra Hermosa, Tecámac
Referee: Bryan Alan Reyes Flores
25 May 2025
16:00 CST (UTC−6)

Héroes de Zaci	3–1	Bombarderos de Tecámac
Hernández 1'; Román 77'; Serna 87'	Report	Cázares 46'

Deportivo Lázaro Cárdenas, Mexico City
Referee: Luis Roberto Hernández Salas

Héroes de Zaci won 4–1 on aggregate.

22 May 2025
20:00 CST (UTC−6)

Cadereyta	2–1	Guerreros de Autlán
Rivera 19'; De León 68'	Report	Arechiga 17'

Estadio Clemente Salinas Netro, Cadereyta
Referee: Carlos Eduardo Torres Maldonado
25 May 2025
16:00 CST (UTC−6)

Guerreros de Autlán	3–0	Cadereyta
Robles 46', 62', 90'	Report

Unidad Deportiva Chapultepec, Autlán
Referee: Enrique Hernández Jaimes

Guerreros de Autlán won 4–2 on aggregate.

21 May 2025
19:30 CST (UTC−6)

Gorilas de Juanacatlán	3–1	Deportivo Zamora
Dávalos 46'; Jáuregui 56', 90'	Report	Vega 80'

Club Juanacatlán, Juanacatlán
Referee: Gerardo Abraham García Armendaris
25 May 2025
15:00 CST (UTC−6)

Deportivo Zamora	3–1	Gorilas de Juanacatlán
Vega 25'; Vázquez 71' (own); González 86'	Report	Rodríguez 47'
Penalties
	8–9

Unidad Deportiva El Chamizal, Zamora
Referee: Luis Ángel Cabrera Carbajal

4–4 on aggregate. Gorilas de Juanacatlán won 8–9 on the Penalty shoot-out

==== Zone Finals ====
The first legs were played on 28 and 29 May, and the second legs were played on 31 May and 1 June 2025.

Team 1	Agg.	Team 2	1st leg	2nd leg
Dragones de Oaxaca	0–2	Héroes de Zaci	0–2	0–0
Guerreros de Autlán	3–2	Gorilas de Juanacatlán	2–1	1–1

28 May 2025
11:00 CST (UTC−6)

Héroes de Zaci	2–0	Dragones de Oaxaca
Hernández 36'; Barojas 45'	Report

Deportivo Lázaro Cárdenas, Mexico City
Attendance: 1,100
Referee: Edwin Alejandro Marín Luna
31 May 2025
16:00 CST (UTC−6)

Dragones de Oaxaca	0–0	Héroes de Zaci
	Report

Polideportivo Ignacio Mejía, Zimatlán de Álvarez
Attendance: 2,000
Referee: Luis Roberto Hernández Salas

Héreos de Zaci won 0–2 on aggregate.

29 May 2025
19:30 CST (UTC−6)

Gorilas de Juanacatlán	1–2	Guerreros de Autlán
Vázquez 61'	Report	Sención 32'; Robles 90'

Club Juanacatlán, Juanacatlán
Attendance: 2,000
Referee: Gerardo Abraham García Armendaris
1 June 2025
16:00 CST (UTC−6)

Guerreros de Autlán	1–1	Gorilas de Juanacatlán
Robles 10'	Report	Vázquez 61'

Unidad Deportiva Chapultepec, Autlán
Attendance: 4,000
Referee: Enrique Hernández Jaimes

Guerreros de Autlán won 3–2 on aggregate.

==== National Final ====
The match was played on 6 June 2025.

Team 1	Score	Team 2
Guerreros de Autlán	0–2	Héroes de Zaci

6 June 2025
14:00 CST (UTC−6)

Guerreros de Autlán	0–2	Héroes de Zaci
	Report	Hernández 11', 21'

Estadio FMF, Toluca
Attendance: 500
Referee: Gerardo Abraham García Armendaris

2024–25 winners

2nd title

== Reserve and Development Teams ==
Each season a table is created among those teams that don't have the right to promote, because they are considered as reserve teams for teams that play in Liga MX, Liga de Expansión and Liga Premier or are independent teams that have requested not to participate for the Promotion due to the fact that they are footballers development projects. The ranking order is determined through the "quotient", which is obtained by dividing the points obtained between the disputed matches, being ordered from highest to lowest. Starting this season, the league decided to divide these teams into two regions, as it happens with the promotion play-offs, so in the final phase the teams will only face rivals from their region, until reaching the national final, which will pit the two regional champions of this modality of the league against each other.

=== Tables ===
South Zone

P	Team	Pts	G	Pts/G	GD
1	Deportiva Venados	67	26	2.577	+47
2	Artesanos Metepec	56	22	2.545	+36
3	Pachuca	64	26	2.462	+60
4	Boston Cancún	62	26	2.385	+29
5	Aragón	70	30	2.333	+52
6	Juárez	64	30	2.133	+39
7	Zitácuaro	40	22	1.818	+7
8	Balam	45	26	1.731	+15
9	Deportivo Napoli Tabasco	42	26	1.615	–1
10	Irapuato Olimpo	43	30	1.433	–22
11	Atlético Quintanarroense	35	26	1.346	–8
12	Atlante Chalco	39	30	1.300	0
13	Alebrijes de Oaxaca	32	26	1.231	–25
14	Cañoneros	32	30	1.067	–24
15	Alebrijes CDMX	25	24	1.042	–21
16	Alebrijes Teotihuacán	27	26	1.038	–14
17	Ciervos	23	24	0.958	–27
18	Faraones de Texcoco	17	26	0.654	–64

Last updated: April 27, 2025
Source: Liga TDP
P = Position; G = Games played; Pts = Points; Pts/G = Ratio of points to games played; GD = Goal difference

North Zone

P	Team	Pts	G	Pts/G	GD
1	Tigres de Álica	72	27	2.667	+32
2	Mineros de Zacatecas	72	28	2.571	+50
3	Tecos	53	22	2.409	+35
4	Halcones AFU	62	27	2.296	+45
5	Irapuato	64	28	2.286	+59
6	Acatlán	50	22	2.273	+23
7	Correcaminos UAT	59	26	2.269	+28
8	Cimarrones de Sonora	43	20	2.150	+19
9	Atlético Morelia–Universidad Michoacana	58	27	2.148	+43
10	Calor Torreón	54	26	2.077	+21
11	Celaya	52	26	2.000	+39
12	Atlético Acaponeta	52	27	1.930	+16
13	Inter Guanajuato	50	26	1.923	+32
14	Necaxa	50	28	1.786	+19
15	Leones Negros UdeG	35	22	1.591	+5
16	Tornados Tlaquepaque	41	26	1.577	–1
17	Atlético Nayarit	41	27	1.519	+1
18	Mineros Querétaro	39	26	1.500	–4
19	Xolos Hermosillo	27	20	1.350	–7
20	Ynjer Cuauhtémoc	33	26	1.269	–11
21	León GEN	19	28	0.679	–29
22	Real Apodaca	8	26	0.308	–64
23	Inter de Querétaro	2	26	0.077	–88

Last updated: April 27, 2025
Source: Liga TDP
P = Position; G = Games played; Pts = Points; Pts/G = Ratio of points to games played; GD = Goal difference

=== Play–offs ===
==== Round of 32 ====
The first legs were played on 3 and 4 May, and the second legs will be played on 10 and 11 May 2025.

Team 1	Agg.	Team 2	1st leg	2nd leg
Deportiva Venados	5–2	Alebrijes Teotihuacán	3–1	2–1
Artesanos Metepec	4–0	Alebrijes CDMX	1–0	3–0
Pachuca	7–0	Cañoneros	3–0	4–0
Boston Cancún	2–2 (4–5)	(p) Alebrijes de Oaxaca	1–0	1–2
Aragón	2–1	Atlante Chalco	0–1	2–0
Juárez	2–2 (2–3)	(p) Atlético Quintanarroense	1–1	1–1
Zitácuaro	8–0	Irapuato Olimpo	5–0	3–0
Balam	2–3	Napoli Tabasco	0–1	2–2
Tigres de Álica	6–1	Tornados Tlaquepaque	1–1	5–0
Mineros de Zacatecas	1–3	Leones Negros UdeG	1–1	0–2
Tecos	1–4	Necaxa	1–2	0–2
Halcones AFU	7–0	Inter Guanajuato	2–0	5–0
Irapuato	4–2	Atlético Acaponeta	2–2	2–0
Acatlán	3–1	Celaya	2–1	1–0
Correcaminos UAT	4–3	Calor Torreón	2–2	2–1
Cimarrones de Sonora	3–2	Atlético Morelia–Universidad Michoacana	3–2	0–0

=== Final stage ===
Round of 16
1S	Deportiva Venados	4	2	6
8S	Alebrijes de Oaxaca	2	2	4
4S	Atlético Aragón	0	1	1 (2
5S	Zitácuaro (p)	0	1	1 (4)
2S	Artesanos Metepec	1	8	9
7S	Atlético Quintanarroense	0	1	1
3S	Pachuca	1	4	5
6S	Napoli Tabasco	0	0	0
3N	Irapuato (p)	0	2	2 (4)
6N	Cimarrones de Sonora	1	1	2 (3)
4N	Acatlán	0	3	3
5N	Correcaminos UAT	0	1	1
2N	Halcones AFU	2	1	3
7N	Necaxa	0	0	0
1N	Tigres de Álica	1	1	2 (3)
8N	Leones Negros UdeG (p)	1	1	2 (4)

Quarter–finals
1S	Deportiva Venados	0	5	5
5S	Zitácuaro	0	0	0
2S	Artesanos Metepec	0	4	4
3S	Pachuca	3	0	3
3N	Irapuato	1	1	2
4N	Acatlán	0	0	0
2N	Halcones AFU	0	1	1
8N	Leones Negros UdeG	1	1	2

Semi–finals
1S	Deportiva Venados	1	3	4
2S	Artesanos Metepec	2	0	2
3N	Irapuato	1	1	2
8N	Leones Negros UdeG	3	2	5

Final
1S	Deportiva Venados	1
8N	Leones Negros UdeG	2

==== Round of 16 ====
The first legs were played on 14 and 15 May, and the second legs were played on 17 and 18 May 2025.

Team 1	Agg.	Team 2	1st leg	2nd leg
Deportiva Venados	6–4	Alebrijes de Oaxaca	4–2	2–2
Artesanos Metepec	9–1	Atlético Quintanarroense	1–0	8–1
Pachuca	5–0	Napoli Tabasco	1–0	4–0
Aragón	1–1 (2–4)	(p) Zitácuaro	0–0	1–1
Tigres de Álica	2–2 (3–4)	(p) Leones Negros UdeG	1–1	1–1
Halcones AFU	3–0	Necaxa	2–0	1–0
Irapuato (p)	2–2 (4–3)	Cimarrones de Sonora	0–1	2–1
Acatlán	3–1	UAT	0–0	3–1

Matches

14 May 2025
18:00 CST (UTC−6)

Alebrijes de Oaxaca	2–4	Deportiva Venados
Bustos 78'; Nájera 81'	Report	López 19', 44'; Núñez 68', 80'

Estadio Tecnológico de Oaxaca, Oaxaca
Referee: Sergio Iván Jiménez Zavala
17 May 2025
15:00 CST (UTC−6)

Deportiva Venados	2–2	Alebrijes de Oaxaca
Ciprián 1'; Beltrán 75'	Report	López 34'; Bustos 58'

Estadio Alonso Diego Molina, Tamanché
Referee: Luis Felipe Villafuerte Villa

Deportiva Venados won 6–4 on aggregate.

14 May 2025
15:00 EST (UTC−5)

Atlético Quintanarroense	0–1	Artesanos Metepec
	Report	Estrada 63'

Sindicato de Taxistas Lázaro Cárdenas, Playa del Carmen
Referee: Benjamín Zúñiga Antonio
17 May 2025
12:00 CST (UTC−6)

Artesanos Metepec	8–1	Atlético Quintanarroense
Pineda 2', 22'; C. Rodríguez 8'; Mora 13'; Segura 40'; Bonilla 58'; J. Rodríguez 60'; Zepeda 86' (own)	Report	Carpio 64'

Unidad Deportiva Alarcón Hisojo, Metepec
Referee: Axel Jesús Ibares González

Artesanos Metepec won 9–1 on aggregate.

14 May 2025
19:00 CST (UTC−6)

Napoli Tabasco	0–1	Pachuca
	Report	Ortega 66'

Estadio Olímpico de Villahermosa, Villahermosa
Referee: Jimmy Acosta Pérez
17 May 2025
11:00 CST (UTC−6)

Pachuca	4–0	Napoli Tabasco
Ortega 14'; Cazares 51'; Rojas 79'; Chaparro 90'	Report

Universidad del Fútbol, San Agustín Tlaxiaca
Referee: Walter Peñaloza Urbina

Pachuca won 5–0 on aggregate.

14 May 2025
19:00 CST (UTC−6)

Zitácuaro	0–0	Aragón
	Report

Estadio Ignacio López Rayón, Zitácuaro
Referee: Andrés Benjamín Hernández Barraza
17 May 2025
16:00 CST (UTC−6)

Aragón	1–1	Zitácuaro
Calderón 63'	Report	Herrera 82'
Penalties
	2–4

Deportivo Francisco Zarco, Mexico City
Referee: Bryan Alan Reyes Flores

1–1 on aggregate. Zitácuaro won 2–4 on the Penalty shoot-out

14 May 2025
11:00 CST (UTC−6)

Leones Negros UdeG	1–1	Tigres de Álica
Sepúlveda 32'	Report	Durán 55'

Club Deportivo La Primavera, Zapopan
Referee: Aarón Vega Cabrera
17 May 2025
16:00 MST (UTC−7)

Tigres de Álica	1-1	Leones Negros UdeG
Martínez 62'	Report	Sepúlveda 55'
Penalties
	3–4

Estadio Nicolás Álvarez Ortega, Tepic
Referee: Aarón Vega Cabrera

2–2 on aggregate. Leones Negros UdeG won 3–4 on the Penalty shoot-out

14 May 2025
10:00 CST (UTC−6)

Correcaminos UAT	0–0	Acatlán
	Report

Estadio Prof. Eugenio Alvizo Porras, Ciudad Victoria
Referee: Octavio Paúl Macías Velázquez
17 May 2025
19:30 CST (UTC−6)

Acatlán	3–1	Correcaminos UAT
Rangel 2'; Vallejo 52'; Chacón 67'	Report	Calzada 20'

Estadio Miguel Hidalgo, Zapotlanejo
Referee: Mario Velázquez Román

Acatlán won 3–1 on aggregate.

15 May 2025
10:00 CST (UTC−6)

Necaxa	0–2	Halcones AFU
	Report	Arzate 58'; Padilla 70'

Casa Club Necaxa Cancha 1, Aguasacalientes
Referee: José Luis Hernández Ochoa
18 May 2025
16:00 CST (UTC−6)

Halcones AFU	1–0	Necaxa
Fuentes 45'	Report

Unidad Deportiva Hermanos López Rayón, Uruapan
Referee: Ángel Azael Azamar Ponce

Halcones AFU won 3–0 on aggregate.

15 May 2025
19:00 MST (UTC−7)

Cimarrones de Sonora	1–0	Irapuato
Sánchez 73'	Report

Estadio Héroe de Nacozari, Hermosillo
Referee: Joan Antonio Soto Soto
18 May 2025
16:00 CST (UTC−6)

Irapuato	2–1	Cimarrones de Sonora
Juárez 45'; Arellano 63'	Report	Arellano 89' (own)
Penalties
	4–3

Estadio Sergio León Chávez, Irapuato
Referee: Christian Cruz Mejía

2–2 on aggregate. Irapuato won 4–3 on the Penalty shoot-out

==== Quarter–finals ====
The first legs were played on 21 and 22 May, and the second legs were played on 24 and 25 May 2025.

Team 1	Agg.	Team 2	1st leg	2nd leg
Deportiva Venados	5–0	Zitácuaro	0–0	5–0
Artesanos Metepec	4–3	Pachuca	0–3	4–0
Halcones AFU	1–2	Leones Negros UdeG	0–1	1–1
Irapuato	2–0	Acatlán	1–0	1–0

Matches

21 May 2025
19:00 CST (UTC−6)

Zitácuaro	0–0	Deportiva Venados
	Report

Estadio Ignacio López Rayón, Zitácuaro
Referee: José Luis Hernández Ochoa
24 May 2025
15:00 CST (UTC−6)

Deportiva Venados	5–0	Zitácuaro
Ciprián 18'; Beltrán 37'; López 51'; Fuentes 68'; Flores 82'	Report

Estadio Alonso Diego Molina, Tamanché
Referee: Benjamín Zúñiga Antonio

Deportiva Venados won 5–0 on aggregate.

21 May 2025
10:00 CST (UTC−6)

Pachuca	3–0	Artesanos Metepec
Valle 3', 26'; Ortega 61'	Report

Universidad del Fútbol, San Agustín Tlaxiaca
Referee: Israel De Jesús Mejía Torres
24 May 2025
12:00 CST (UTC−6)

Artesanos Metepec	4–0	Pachuca
Ramírez 25'; Pineda 48', 61'; Rodríguez 71'	Report

Unidad Deportiva Alarcón Hisojo, Metepec
Referee: Christian Cruz Mejía

Artesanos Metepec won 4–3 on aggregate.

22 May 2025
11:00 CST (UTC−6)

Leones Negros UdeG	1–0	Halcones AFU
Díaz 36'	Report

Club Deportivo La Primavera, Zapopan
Referee: Víctor Alexis Rosas Hernández
25 May 2025
16:00 CST (UTC−6)

Halcones AFU	1–1	Leones Negros UdeG
Fuentes 12'	Report	Padilla 37'

Unidad Deportiva Hermanos López Rayón, Uruapan
Referee: Karol Jesús Zamudio Ulloa

Leones Negros UdeG won 1–2 on aggregate.

22 May 2025
19:30 CST (UTC−6)

Acatlán	0–1	Irapuato
	Report	Martínez 56'

Estadio Miguel Hidalgo, Zapotlanejo
Referee: Edwin Alejandro Marín Luna
25 May 2025
16:00 CST (UTC−6)

Irapuato	1–0	Acatlán
Pérez 52'	Report

Estadio Sergio León Chávez, Irapuato
Referee: Ángel Efrén Sotelo Centeno

Irapuato won 2–0 on aggregate.

==== Semi–finals ====
The first legs were played on 28 and 29 May, and the second legs were played on 31 May and 1 June 2025.

Team 1	Agg.	Team 2	1st leg	2nd leg
Deportiva Venados	4–2	Artesanos Metepec	1–2	3–0
Irapuato	2–5	Leones Negros UdeG	1–3	1–2

28 May 2025
12:00 CST (UTC−6)

Artesanos Metepec	2–1	Deportiva Venados
Rodríguez 32'; Pineda 58'	Report	Ciprián 35'

Estadio Alonso Diego Molina, Tamanché
Referee: Luis Ángel Cabrera Carbajal
31 May 2025
15:00 CST (UTC−6)

Deportiva Venados	3–0	Artesanos Metepec
González 33'; Flores 58'; López 83'	Report

Unidad Deportiva Alarcón Hisojo, Metepec
Referee: Mauricio Roque Trejo

Deportiva Venados won 3–0 on aggregate.

29 May 2025
11:00 CST (UTC−6)

Leones Negros UdeG	3–1	Irapuato
Barba 34', 90'; Sepúlveda 49'	Report	Juárez 69'

Club Deportivo La Primavera, Zapopan
Referee: Christian Cruz Mejía
1 June 2025
16:00 CST (UTC−6)

Irapuato	1–2	Leones Negros UdeG
Chávez 26'	Report	Jiménez 54' (own); Becerra 80'

Estadio Sergio León Chávez, Irapuato
Referee: José Luis Hernández Ochoa

Leones Negros UdeG won 2–5 on aggregate.

==== Final ====
The match was played on 6 June 2025.

Team 1	Score	Team 2
Deportiva Venados	1–2	Leones Negros UdeG

6 June 2025
10:00 CST (UTC−6)

Deportiva Venados	1–2	Leones Negros UdeG
Ciprián 24'	Report	Barba 58'; Nuño 87'

Estadio FMF, Toluca
Attendance: 300
Referee: José Luis Hernández Ochoa

2024–25 winners

1st title

== Regular season statistics ==
=== Top goalscorers ===
Players sorted first by goals scored, then by last name.

Rank	Player	Club	Goals
1	(Mexico) Erick Robles	Guerreros de Autlán	42
2	(Mexico) Alexander Pozos	Ecatepec	41
3	(Mexico) Fabián Tadeo	Atlético Leonés	35
4	(Mexico) Samuel Mendieta	Titanes de Querétaro	31
5	(Mexico) Jonathan Hernández	Héroes de Zaci	30
6	(Mexico) Edward Hilaire	Marina	30
7	(Mexico) Irvin Campos	Delfines UGM	28
7	(Mexico) Daniel Martínez	Águila Azteca	28
7	(Mexico) Juan Jesús Noguez	Orishas Tepeji	28
10	(Mexico) Christopher Brito	Atlético Real Morelos	26

Source:Liga TDP

== See also ==
- 2024–25 Liga MX season
- 2024–25 Liga de Expansión MX season
- 2024–25 Serie A de México season
- 2024–25 Serie B de México season
- 2024 Copa Promesas MX
- 2025 Copa Conecta
