= 2023–24 Serie A de México season =

Serie A de México
- Season: 2023–24
- Champions: Tampico Madero (4th title)
- Promoted: Aguacateros de Peribán; Aragón
- Matches: 544
- Goals: 1,346 (2.47 per match)
- Top goalscorer: Eduardo Banda (21 goals)
- Biggest home win: Alacranes de Durango 8–0 Mexicali (24 November 2023)
- Biggest away win: Inter de Querétaro 1–7 Sporting Canamy (16 March 2024)
- Highest scoring: Atlético Aragón 4–4 Irapuato (26 August 2023); Alacranes de Durango 8–0 Mexicali (24 November 2023); Inter de Querétaro 1–7 Sporting Canamy (16 March 2024)
- Longest winning run: 10 matches Chihuahua
- Longest unbeaten run: 19 matches Racing Porto Palmeiras
- Longest winless run: 16 matches Inter de Querétaro
- Longest losing run: 15 matches Inter de Querétaro
- Highest attendance: 25,000; Irapuato 0–0 Petroleros de Salamanca (14 October 2023)
- Lowest attendance: 20; Leones Negros 2–1 Mineros de Fresnillo (21 October 2023)
- Total attendance: 619,170
- Average attendance: 1,100
- Stats are from the regular season only

The 2023–24 Serie A de México season is part of the third-tier football league of Mexico. The tournament began on 11 August 2023 and finished on 25 May 2024.

== Offseason Changes ==
- The 2022–23 Serie A champions Tampico Madero and runners-up Tuzos UAZ were not certified for promotion to the Liga de Expansión MX, they will remain on Serie A.
- On May 7, 2023 Alebrijes UABJO was promoted to Serie A. On June 15, 2023 the team was relocated to Reynosa and renamed C.F. Orgullo Reynosa.
- On May 21, 2023 Aguacateros de Peribán F.C. and Atlético Aragón were promoted to Serie A from Liga TDP.
- On May 22, 2023 Catedráticos Elite F.C. was renamed Petroleros de Salamanca.
- On May 25, 2023 Escorpiones F.C. was relocated to Zacatepec and the team was renamed to Escorpiones Zacatepec.
- On June 1, 2023 Club Calor was promoted to Serie A from Serie B.
- On June 7, 2023 Leviatán F.C. was suspended from the 2023–24 season for failing to fulfill the obligations as an affiliate.
- On June 13, 2023 Real de Arteaga was relocated to Apodaca, Nuevo León and renamed Real Apodaca F.C.
- On June 28, 2023 Coras was relocated to Piedras Negras, Coahuila, the team provisionally kept the original name
- On June 29, 2023 Durango was returned to Liga Premier after a year in Liga de Expansión MX, the team lost its place in the second–tier due to financial problems. The Liga de Expansión requested that the Liga Premier propose another affiliated team to play as a guest team in the second–tier, however, the league did not propose any other affiliate to replace Durango. The team rejoined Liga Premier on 18 July 2023.
- On June 30, 2023 Pioneros de Cancún was promoted to Serie A from Serie B.
- On June 30, 2023 Irapuato and Racing Porto Palmeiras joined the league as expansion teams.
- On June 30, 2023 Dongu and Pachuca were relocated at Serie B.
- On June 30, 2023 the league format was modified, the single-season tournament was reinstated after two years with two tournaments per season.
- On June 30, 2023 C.D. Tulancingo was relocated at Serie B, however, days later, on July 18, the team was put on hiatus.
- On July 18, 2023 Aguacateros CDU was relocated at Serie B.

=== In–season changes ===
- Since Week 8 Colima F.C. moved to Estadio Colima due to remodeling works at the Estadio Olímpico Universitario, the stadium originally registered by the team for the season.
- On January 8, 2024 Yalmakán F.C. announced that it will stop participating in the season due to financial problems. On February 23, the league annulled all team results and statistics.
- On March 20, 2024, Chihuahua F.C. has discontinued their participation due to legal actions within the ownership and the FMF is processing the dissolution of the team.

== Regular season ==
The member clubs of the Serie A for the 2023–24 season are listed as follows.

=== Group 1 ===
==== Stadium and locations ====
Location of teams in the 2023–24 Serie A Group 1

Club	Manager	City	Stadium	Capacity	Affiliate	Kit manufacturer	Shirt sponsor(s) front
Alacranes de Durango	(Mexico) Ricardo Rayas	Durango City, Durango	Francisco Zarco	18,000	–	Keuka	BHermanos, #WeAreOne
Calor	(Mexico) Omar Hernández	Monclova, Coahuila	Ciudad Deportiva Nora Leticia Rocha	5,000	–	Fastee	Grupo Lazalde, Metelmex, NRT, Coca-Cola, Acereros de Monclova, Edcor
Cimarrones de Sonora	(Mexico) Alfredo Durán	Hermosillo, Sonora	Héroe de Nacozari	18,747	Cimarrones de Sonora	Keuka	Caliente
Colima	(Mexico) Sergio Bueno	Colima City, Colima	Colima (Note: Although the team started the season at the Estadio Olímpico Universitario de Colima, the club changed field starting in week 8 of the season.)	12,000	–	Reator	Forma Interior
Coras	(Mexico) Elias Mdahuar	Piedras Negras, Coahuila	Sección 123	6,000	–	Keuka	–
Gavilanes de Matamoros	(Mexico) Raúl Salazar	Matamoros, Tamaulipas	El Hogar	22,000	–	Keuka	KarzoGas, OXXO
Leones Negros UdeG	(Mexico) Ahuizotl Sánchez	Zapopan, Jalisco	Instalaciones Club Deportivo U.de G. Cancha 3	3,000	Leones Negros UdeG	Sporelli	Electrolit
Los Cabos United	(Chile) Rodrigo Ruiz	Los Cabos, Baja California Sur	Complejo Don Koll	3,500	–	Capelli Sport	Cabo Wabo
Mexicali	(Mexico) Manuel Naya Barba	Mexicali, Baja California	Ciudad Deportiva Mexicali	5,000	–	Trenu	Estructuras y Perfiles, Leuken
Mineros de Fresnillo	(Mexico) Isaac Martínez	Fresnillo, Zacatecas	Unidad Deportiva Minera Fresnillo	6,000	Mineros de Zacatecas	Sporelli	Fresnillo, Mifel
Real Apodaca	(Mexico) Omar Gómez	Apodaca, Nuevo León	Centenario del Ejército Mexicano	2,000	–	In–house	Financiera Altitud
Reynosa	(Mexico) Édgar Barrón	Reynosa, Tamaulipas	Unidad Deportiva Solidaridad	20,000	–	Sporelli	–
Saltillo	(Mexico) Isaac Saldívar	Saltillo, Coahuila	Francisco I. Madero	12,000	–	Keuka	Grupo DAVISA, Grupo Avant, Grupo VVR
Tecos	(Mexico) Jorge Hernández	Zapopan, Jalisco	Tres de Marzo	18,779	–	Silver Sport	–
Tuzos UAZ	(Mexico) Rubén Hernández	Zacatecas City, Zacatecas	Carlos Vega Villalba	20,068	–	Marval	Fresnillo, UAZ
Tritones Vallarta	(Mexico) Juan Pablo Alfaro	Puerto Vallarta, Jalisco	Ciudad del Deporte San José del Valle	4,000	–	Sporelli	Megacable
UAT	(Mexico) Gandhi Vega	Ciudad Victoria, Tamaulipas	Marte R. Gómez (Note: Although the club registered the Estadio Marte R. Gómez as its official field, the team plays most of its matches at the Estadio Universitario Eugenio Alvizo Porras)	10,520	UAT	Silver Sport	–

==== Standings ====
Pos	Team	Pld	W	D	L	GF	GA	GD	BP	Pts	Qualification or relegation
1	Los Cabos United	32	19	8	5	55	27	+28	6	71	Qualification to Liguilla de Ascenso Semi–finals
2	Alacranes de Durango	32	17	11	4	53	22	+31	5	67	Qualification to Liguilla de Ascenso Reclassification
3	Gavilanes de Matamoros	32	16	8	8	46	33	+13	1	57	Qualification to Liguilla de Ascenso Reclassification
4	UAT	32	16	4	12	48	47	+1	5	57	Qualification to Liguilla de Filiales
5	Tecos	32	15	6	11	54	36	+18	2	53	Qualification to Liguilla de Ascenso Reclassification
6	Leones Negros	32	15	4	13	47	45	+2	3	52	Qualification to Liguilla de Filiales
7	Cimarrones de Sonora	32	13	8	11	32	31	+1	1	48	Qualification to Liguilla de Filiales
8	Tuzos UAZ	32	10	12	10	46	38	+8	5	47	Qualification to Liguilla de Ascenso Reclassification
9	Reynosa	32	11	13	8	31	29	+2	1	47	Qualification to Liguilla de Ascenso Reclassification
10	Tritones Vallarta	32	11	11	10	33	27	+6	2	46	Qualification to Liguilla de Ascenso Reclassification
11	Saltillo	32	11	12	9	30	31	−1	1	46	
12	Real Apodaca	32	11	8	13	42	41	+1	4	45	
13	Mineros de Fresnillo	32	10	10	12	38	41	−3	0	40	Qualification to Liguilla de Filiales
14	Calor	32	9	8	15	31	50	−19	2	37	
15	Mexicali	32	8	5	19	22	56	−34	0	29	
16	Colima	32	7	3	22	31	62	−31	1	25	
17	Coras	32	6	3	23	25	48	−23	0	21	

Updated to match(es) played on 27 April 2024. Source: Liga Premier FMF

==== Positions by Round ====
Qualification to Semi-finals
Qualification to Reclassification
Last place in table

Team ╲ Round	1	2	3	4	5	6	7	8	9	10	11	12	13	14	15	16	17	18	19	20	21	22	23	24	25	26	27	28	29	30	31	32	33	34
Los Cabos	10	6	5	2	2	2	2	2	2	2	2	2	2	2	2	2	2	2	2	2	2	2	2	2	3†	3	3	3	1	2	2	1	1	1
Durango	9	11	7	6	4	3	3	3	4	4	3	3	3	4	3	4	4	3	3	4	4	4	3	3	2	2†	2	2	2	1	1	2	2	2
Gavilanes	17	18	12	7	7	5	8	5	9	11	11	11	11	11	11	12	13	11	11	10	10	8	6	8	8	7	10	9	6	3	4	3	3	3†
UAT	18	9	13	9	3	4	4	4	3	3	4	5	5	5	5	5	3	4	5	3	3	3	4	4	4	4	4	4	3	4	3	4	4	4
Tecos	5	7	10	14	15	10	13	9	7	5	8	6	4	3	4	3	5	5	6	7	8	9	7	7	9	8	8	10	7	7	7	6	5	5
Leones Negros	6	4	4	5	8	11	10	12	11	6	10	9	6	6	6	7	9	9	8	6	5	5	5	6	5	5	5	5	4	5	5	5	6	6
Cimarrones	11	8	11	8	11	13	12	8	6	8	9	8	9	10	10	10	10	10	10	11	11	11	10	11	10	10	12†	12	11	12	11	11	10	7
UAZ	2	3	3	4	6	8	5	10	8	9	6	4	7	7	7	8	8	8	9	9	7	7	9	5	6	9	9	6	5	6	6	7	7†	8
Reynosa	13	14	14	10	9	6	7	6	10	10	7	10	10	8	8	6	6	6	4	5	6	6	8	9	7	6	7	7	10	8	9	9†	11	9
Vallarta	3	2	2	3	5	7	9	11	12	12	12	12	12	12	12	13	15	16	16	15	15	15	13	13	15	15	15	14	12	10	10	10	9	10
Saltillo	7	13	16	17	13	9	6	7	5	7	5	7	8	9	9	9	7	7	7	8	9	10	11	10	12	11	6	8†	9	11	8	8	8	11
Apodaca	16	12	15	15	17	18	18	18	18	17	18	17	16	17	17	17	17	17	17	17	17	16	16	15	13	13	13	13	13	13†	13	12	12	12
Fresnillo	8	10	6	11	10	12	11	13	14	13	13	13	13	13	13	11	11	13	12	12	12	12	12	12	11	12	11	11	8	9	12	13	13	13
Calor	15	15	17	18	18	16	16	14	13	14	15	15	14	15	15	16	16	15	15	14	13	13	14	14	14	14	14	15	14†	14	14	14	14	14
Mexicali	12	16	9	12	14	15	15	17	17	18	16	18	18	18	18	18	18	18	18	18	18	18	18	18	18	18	18	18	17	17	15	15	15	15
Colima	4	5	8	13	16	17	17	16	16	16	17	16	17	16	16	15	12	14	14	16	16	17	17	17	17	17	17	17	15	15	16	16	16	16
Coras	14	17	18	16	12	14	14	15	15	15	14	14	15	14	14	14	14	12	13	13	14	14	15	16	16	16	16	16	16	16	17†	17	17	17
Chihuahua	1	1	1	1	1	1	1	1	1	1	1	1	1	1	1	1	1	1	1	1	1	1	1	1	1	1	1	1	18	18	18	18	18	18

Updated to match(es) played on 27 April 2024. Source: Liga Premier FMF
Notes: † indicates team rested that round

==== Results ====
Home \ Away	CAL	CIM	COL	COR	DUR	FRE	GAV	LNU	LCU	MXL	RAP	REY	SAL	TEC	TRV	UAZ	UAT
Calor	—	1–0	2–0	2–0	0–1	1–1	2–2	2–1	1–4	4–2	2–1	0–2	0–0	1–1	1–0	2–1	1–3
Cimarrones de Sonora	1–0	—	2–1	3–1	0–0	2–0	1–1	3–0	0–1	0–0	3–0	1–0	1–2	1–4	2–1	1–0	3–3
Colima	4–1	2–1	—	2–1	0–1	1–1	0–1	0–1	2–1	1–0	0–6	0–1	0–1	1–4	0–0	2–4	2–4
Coras	4–0	0–1	5–2	—	1–2	2–0	2–1	0–3	0–2	0–1	0–1	0–0	0–2	2–0	0–2	1–2	1–2
Durango	2–1	2–0	4–0	1–0	—	4–1	4–1	2–1	0–0	8–0	1–0	2–2	2–2	1–1	1–1	0–0	2–0
Mineros de Fresnillo	3–1	1–1	3–2	2–0	1–0	—	3–0	1–1	0–2	5–0	4–2	0–0	1–1	2–3	0–0	1–1	3–1
Gavilanes de Matamoros	1–0	1–1	3–0	2–0	0–3	0–1	—	3–0	1–0	5–1	0–0	0–1	1–1	2–0	1–0	3–0	1–2
Leones Negros	1–0	0–0	1–0	3–0	1–2	3–0	1–4	—	2–1	3–1	3–1	5–0	4–1	1–0	0–2	2–2	2–1
Los Cabos United	1–1	2–0	3–2	1–0	0–0	1–0	1–1	2–0	—	2–0	3–1	1–1	1–0	2–1	1–0	4–4	5–1
Mexicali	2–0	0–1	1–0	1–2	2–0	1–0	0–1	1–3	0–2	—	0–4	1–1	1–0	2–1	1–2	2–1	0–2
Real Apodaca	2–2	2–0	0–2	0–0	0–2	2–0	0–1	2–2	2–1	1–1	—	2–0	1–1	2–3	2–1	1–1	2–4
Reynosa	0–0	1–0	0–0	2–1	2–1	1–2	1–1	2–0	1–1	1–0	0–1	—	0–0	1–1	0–1	3–1	2–0
Saltillo	1–0	0–1	1–0	2–1	1–1	0–0	1–2	3–1	0–3	0–0	0–0	2–1	—	1–0	0–1	2–1	1–2
Tecos	6–0	2–0	2–0	1–0	2–0	2–1	2–3	4–0	1–2	2–0	2–1	2–1	1–0	—	2–3	1–1	1–2
Tritones Vallarta	1–1	0–0	2–3	0–0	1–1	3–0	1–1	0–2	3–2	1–0	2–0	0–0	1–2	0–0	—	0–0	3–0
Tuzos UAZ	0–1	3–0	3–1	3–0	1–1	1–1	3–0	2–0	0–1	2–0	0–1	2–2	2–2	1–1	2–1	—	2–0
UAT	2–1	0–1	2–1	2–1	0–2	2–0	1–2	3–0	2–2	1–1	0–2	1–2	0–0	2–1	2–0	1–0	—

Updated to match(es) played on 27 April 2024. Source: Liga Premier FMF
Legend: Blue = home team win; Yellow = draw; Red = away team win.

=== Group 2 ===
==== Stadium and locations ====
Location of teams in the 2023–24 Serie A Group 2

Club	Manager	City	Stadium	Capacity	Affiliate	Kit manufacturer	Shirt sponsor(s) front
Aguacateros de Peribán	(Mexico) Marco Angúlo	Peribán, Michoacán	Municipal de Peribán (Note: The team started the season at the Unidad Deportiva Hermanos López Rayón in the nearby city of Uruapan, because the Estadio Municipal de Peribán is undergoing improvement works. On Week 20 the team returned to Peribán)	3,000	–	Silver Sport	Aguacates Chahena, Ávalos Fresh Avocados, Meraki
Atlético Aragón	(Mexico) Juan Carlos Moreno	Cuautitlán, State of Mexico	Los Pinos	5,000	–	In–house	AICCON
Cafetaleros de Chiapas	(Argentina) César Alexenicer	Tuxtla Gutiérrez, Chiapas	Víctor Manuel Reyna	29,001	–	Keuka	Zoé Water, Sushi Itto, Domino's GPM
Deportiva Venados	(Mexico) Alfredo García Salmones	Tamanché, Yucatán	Alonso Diego Molina	2,500	–	Foursport	–
Escorpiones Zacatepec	(Mexico) Miguel Gutiérrez	Zacatepec, Morelos	Agustín "Coruco" Díaz	24,313	–	Keuka	–
Halcones de Zapopan	(Mexico) Oscar Romero	Zapotlanejo, Jalisco	Miguel Hidalgo	1,700	–	Keuka	JGClean, JGBerries
Inter Querétaro	(Colombia) Aquivaldo Mosquera	Querétaro City, Querétaro	Olímpico de Querétaro	4,600	–	Silver Sport	Colegio Lafayette, Gattuso, Vazloop
Inter Playa del Carmen	(Mexico) Carlos Bracamontes	Playa del Carmen, Quintana Roo	Unidad Deportiva Mario Villanueva Madrid	7,500	–	Foursport	Playa del Carmen
Irapuato	(Mexico) Víctor Medina	Irapuato, Guanajuato	Sergio León Chávez	25,000	–	Silver Sport	Healthy People, Tonic Music, Astrid Spa, TV Cuatro
La Piedad	(Mexico) Fernando López	La Piedad, Michoacán	Juan N. López	13,356	–	Silver Sport	Dulces de La Rosa, Grupo Bafar, El Tiliche, Holiday Inn La Piedad
Lobos ULMX	(Mexico) Rowan Vargas	Celaya, Guanajuato	Miguel Alemán Valdés	23,182	Celaya	Keuka	TV Cuatro
Montañeses	(Mexico) Víctor Hernández	Orizaba, Veracruz	Socum	7,000	–	In–house	Tyasa, Fénix
Petroleros de Salamanca	(Mexico) Víctor Saavedra	Salamanca, Guanajuato	Sección XXIV	10,000	–	Silver Sport	Expertics, TV Cuatro
Pioneros de Cancún	(Mexico) Enrique Vela	Cancún, Quintana Roo	Andrés Quintana Roo (Note: The team plays some of its matches in the Estadio Cancún 86.)	17,289	Cancún	Spiro	Colegio Boston
Racing Porto Palmeiras	(Mexico) Héctor Jair Real	Boca del Río, Veracruz	Unidad Deportiva Hugo Sánchez	1,200	–	Joma	Racing City Group
Sporting Canamy	(Mexico) Francisco Tena	Oaxtepec, Morelos	Olímpico de Oaxtepec	9,000	–	In–house	LEON
Tampico Madero	(Mexico) Gastón Obledo	Tampico and Ciudad Madero, Tamaulipas	Tamaulipas	19,667	–	Arrieta	GDL Transportes, Holding Industrial

==== Standings ====
Pos	Team	Pld	W	D	L	GF	GA	GD	BP	Pts	Qualification or relegation
1	Racing Porto Palmeiras	32	23	5	4	46	18	+28	3	77	Qualification to Liguilla de Ascenso Semi–finals
2	Tampico Madero (C, P)	32	18	7	7	59	29	+30	6	67	Qualification to Liguilla de Ascenso Reclassification
3	Deportiva Venados	32	18	5	9	52	38	+14	2	61	Qualification to Liguilla de Ascenso Reclassification
4	Irapuato	32	13	13	6	55	24	+31	5	57	Qualification to Liguilla de Ascenso Reclassification
5	Aguacateros de Peribán	32	16	7	9	56	37	+19	2	57	Qualification to Liguilla de Ascenso Reclassification
6	Petroleros de Salamanca	32	16	5	11	34	22	+12	3	56	Qualification to Liguilla de Ascenso Reclassification
7	Inter Playa del Carmen	32	13	11	8	39	29	+10	6	56	Qualification to Liguilla de Ascenso Reclassification
8	Montañeses	32	15	7	10	47	42	+5	4	56	
9	Escorpiones Zacatepec	32	14	10	8	38	29	+9	2	54	
10	Cafetaleros de Chiapas	32	13	5	14	40	38	+2	3	47	
11	La Piedad	32	13	6	13	39	35	+4	2	47	
12	Pioneros de Cancún	32	9	8	15	32	47	−15	2	37	
13	Lobos ULMX	32	9	6	17	29	47	−18	1	34	
14	Halcones de Zapopan	32	5	16	11	29	38	−9	1	32	
15	Sporting Canamy	32	6	7	19	40	58	−18	3	28	
16	Atlético Aragón	32	6	5	21	30	62	−32	2	25	
17	Inter de Querétaro	32	2	3	27	18	90	−72	1	10	

Updated to match(es) played on 28 April 2024. Source: Liga Premier FMF
(C) Champions; (P) Promoted

==== Positions by Round ====
Qualification to Semi-finals
Qualification to Reclassification
Last place in table

Team ╲ Round	1	2	3	4	5	6	7	8	9	10	11	12	13	14	15	16	17	18	19	20	21	22	23	24	25	26	27	28	29	30	31	32	33	34
Porto Palmeiras	2	2	2	8	8	5	2	2	2	1	1	1	1	2	1	1	1	1	1	1	1	1	1	1	1	1†	1	1	1	1	1	1	1	1
Tampico Madero	5	6	5	2	4	8	9	9	12	9	8	6	4	5	5	3	6	7	6	4	2	3	3	3	3	3	5	3	3	3†	2	2	2	2
Dep. Venados	9	3	7	5	6	2	1	1	1	3	3	2	3	3	3	4	3	4	2	2	3†	2	2	2	2	4	2	2	2	2	3	3	3	3
Irapuato	15	13	14	14	9	6	7	5	7	7	6	7	6	7	6	6	5	3	4	5	5	5†	6	8	7	7	6	5	5	4	4	4	4	4
Peribán	8	4	3	3	1	3	5	4	5	5	7	8	8	8	7	7	7	6	7	9	7	6	5	5†	6	6	4	6	6	6	7	5	6	5
Salamanca	3	5	9	6	3	1	4	3	3	2	2	3	2	1	2	2	2	2	3	3	4	4	4†	6	5	5	7	7	7	7	6	8	5	6
Inter Playa	13	1	1	1	2	4	3	8	4	4	4	5	5	4	4	5	4	5	5†	6	6	8	9	9	10	10	9	9	9	9	9	9	9	7
Montañeses	17	18	13	7	10	13	11	11	13	10	10	9	9	10	10	9	11	10	9	8	8	7	8	7	8	8	8	8	8†	8	8	6	8	8
Escorpiones	10	11	12	9	5	7	8	6	8	8	9	10	11	9	9	11	9	9	10	10	10	9	7	4	4	2	3	4†	4	5	5	7	7	9
Cafetaleros	1	7	10	15	11	9	6	7	6	6	5	4	7	6	8	8	8	8	8	7	9	10	10	10	9	9	10†	10	10	10	10	10	10	10
La Piedad	14	14	8	4	7	12	10	12	10	12	11	11	10	11	11	10	10	11	12	12	12	12	12	12	12	12	12	11	11	11	11	11	11	11†
Pioneros	7	9	15	13	14	15	12	13	11	13	12	12	12	12	13	12	12	12†	11	11	11	11	11	11	11	11	11	12	12	12	12	12	12	12
Lobos ULMX	11	10	4	10	12	14	15	16	14	14	16	14	15	13	12	13	14	13	14	14	15	15	14	14	15	15	14	15	13	13	15†	13	13	13
Zapopan	12	16	18	17	18	16	18	18	18	18	18	18	17	17	17	17	17	17	17	17	16	16	16	16	14	14	15	16	16	15	14	14	14†	14
Sp. Canamy	16	17	11	12	13	11	14	14	15	15	14	15	13	14	14	14	13	14	13	13†	13	13	15	15	16	16	16	13	14	14	13	15	15	15
Aragón	4	8	6	11	15	10	13	10	9	11	13	13	14	15	15	15	16	15	15	15	14	14	13	13	13	13	13	14	15	16	16	16†	16	16
Inter Querétaro	18	15	17	18	17	18	17	17	17	17	17	17	18	18	18	18	18	18	18	18	18	18	18	17	17†	17	17	17	17	17	17	17	17	17
Yalmakán	6	12	16	16	16	17	16	15	16	16	15	16	16	16	16	16	15	16	16	16	17	17	17	18	18	18	18	18	18	18	18	18	18	18

Updated to match(es) played on 28 April 2024. Source: Liga Premier FMF
Notes: † indicates team rested that round

==== Results ====
Home \ Away	APB	ARA	CAF	DVE	ESC	HZP	INQ	INP	IRA	LPD	LUM	MON	SAL	PIO	RPP	SCA	TAM
Aguacateros de Peribán	—	2–1	4–1	2–3	3–1	1–1	4–1	1–0	1–1	4–0	4–0	3–1	2–0	2–1	0–2	3–1	0–2
Atlético Aragón	1–2	—	0–1	1–3	1–0	0–0	2–0	1–3	4–4	2–3	0–3	0–1	1–0	2–3	1–2	1–0	0–1
Cafetaleros de Chiapas	0–1	2–2	—	2–0	0–1	0–0	3–1	2–0	0–2	1–0	3–0	1–4	0–2	1–1	1–1	4–0	2–1
Deportiva Venados	3–1	4–0	1–2	—	4–1	3–0	2–0	1–1	3–2	2–1	0–0	4–2	2–1	2–1	1–2	0–0	2–0
Escorpiones Zacatepec	0–0	4–0	1–0	0–3	—	2–0	3–0	0–1	0–3	1–0	2–0	1–1	0–0	0–0	0–0	3–1	1–0
Halcones de Zapopan	1–1	2–2	0–0	0–1	1–1	—	0–1	0–1	1–1	0–0	3–0	1–2	0–1	2–0	1–0	2–2	0–2
Inter de Querétaro	0–4	2–4	1–4	0–2	1–1	3–3	—	0–2	0–5	1–2	0–1	0–2	0–2	1–0	0–3	1–7	0–3
Inter Playa del Carmen	3–0	3–2	3–1	0–1	2–1	1–1	3–0	—	0–0	0–3	1–0	1–1	0–1	0–0	1–1	1–1	0–0
Irapuato	2–2	0–0	1–0	2–0	1–1	0–0	6–1	0–0	—	3–0	1–1	1–0	0–0	4–1	0–1	5–0	4–2
La Piedad	2–1	1–0	2–1	4–1	0–1	0–0	1–0	2–1	0–1	—	1–0	1–1	0–2	1–2	1–2	3–0	4–0
Lobos ULMX	0–2	2–0	0–1	1–1	0–1	2–3	1–1	3–3	0–0	0–3	—	2–1	1–0	5–0	0–2	2–1	1–0
Montañeses	3–2	2–1	1–2	1–0	1–3	2–1	2–1	0–2	2–0	2–2	2–1	—	0–1	2–0	1–1	3–1	1–1
Petroleros de Salamanca	1–0	1–0	1–0	5–0	1–3	1–1	2–0	3–1	0–0	1–0	1–0	0–1	—	1–3	0–1	1–0	1–1
Pioneros de Cancún	1–1	3–0	2–4	1–1	0–1	0–0	2–0	1–3	1–0	0–0	1–2	2–0	1–0	—	1–2	1–0	1–3
Racing Porto Palmeiras	3–1	2–0	1–0	2–0	2–1	3–0	2–0	0–2	2–1	1–0	1–0	0–2	2–1	2–0	—	1–0	2–0
Sporting Canamy	1–2	0–1	2–0	1–2	2–2	2–3	6–2	0–0	0–5	2–0	3–0	2–2	0–2	2–2	2–0	—	0–2
Tampico Madero	0–0	6–0	2–1	2–0	1–1	3–2	6–0	2–0	1–0	2–2	5–1	4–1	2–1	3–0	0–0	2–1	—

Updated to match(es) played on 28 April 2024. Source: Liga Premier FMF
Legend: Blue = home team win; Yellow = draw; Red = away team win.

=== Regular season statistics ===
==== Top goalscorers ====
Players sorted first by goals scored, then by last name.

Rank	Player	Club	Goals
1	(Mexico) Eduardo Banda	Saltillo (Weeks 1 – 17); Real Apodaca (Weeks 18 – )	21
2	(Colombia) Klinsman Calderón	Cafetaleros de Chiapas	16
2	(Mexico) Hugo Rodríguez	Sporting Canamy	16
4	(Mexico) Alan Cota	Aguacateros de Peribán	15
4	(Mexico) Denilson Muñoz	Leones Negros	15
6	(Mexico) Martín Abundis	Deportiva Venados	14
6	(Mexico) Christopher Cortés	Tuzos UAZ	14
6	(Mexico) Adolfo Hernández	Irapuato	14
6	(Ecuador) Santiago Micolta	Deportiva Venados	14
6	(Mexico) Julio Rangel	Los Cabos United	14

Source:Liga Premier FMF

==== Hat-tricks ====
Player	For	Against	Result	Date	Round	Reference
(Mexico) Carlos López	Chihuahua	UAT	0 – 5 (A)	11 August 2023	1	
(Mexico) Denilson Muñoz	Leones Negros	Coras	3 – 0 (H)	26 August 2023	3	
(Colombia) Yerson Rivas	Sporting Canamy	Inter Querétaro	6 – 2 (H)	13 October 2023	11	
(Ecuador) Santiago Micolta	Deportiva Venados	Escorpiones Zacatepec	4 – 1 (H)	11 November 2023	15	
(Mexico) Emiliano Martínez	Pioneros de Cancún	Atlético Aragón	2 – 3 (A)	18 November 2023	16	
(Mexico) Eduardo Banda	Saltillo	Leones Negros	3 – 1 (H)	26 November 2023	17	
(Mexico) Julio Rangel	Los Cabos United	Saltillo	0 – 3 (A)	28 January 2024	20	
(Mexico) Christopher Cortés	Tuzos UAZ	Cimarrones de Sonora	3 – 0 (H)	3 February 2024	21	
(Mexico) Eleuterio Jiménez	La Piedad	Sporting Canamy	3 – 0 (H)	17 February 2024	23	
(Mexico) Adolfo Hernández	Irapuato	Sporting Canamy	0 – 5 (A)	2 March 2024	25	
(Mexico) José Luis Ríos	Los Cabos United	UAT	5 – 1 (H)	9 March 2024	27	
(Mexico) Hugo Rodríguez	Sporting Canamy	Inter Querétaro	1 – 7 (A)	16 March 2024	28	
(Argentina) Nicolás Ankia	Cafetaleros de Chiapas	Sporting Canamy	4 – 0 (H)	30 March 2024	30	
(Mexico) Heber Velázquez	UAT	Calor	1 – 3 (A)	5 April 2024	31	
(Ecuador) Santiago Micolta	Deportiva Venados	Montañeses	4 – 2 (H)	20 April 2024	33	
(Mexico) Eduardo Banda	Real Apodaca	Colima	0 – 6 (A)	27 April 2024	34	

(H) – Home; (A) – Away

=== Attendance ===
==== Per team ====
Pos	Team	Total	High	Low	Average	Change
1	Irapuato	187,500	25,000	7,000	11,719	n/a^{6}
2	Tampico Madero	80,501	8,500	1,500	5,031	−58.8%
3	Gavilanes de Matamoros	40,450	6,000	600	2,528	−29.4%
4	Petroleros de Salamanca	37,768	8,000	268	2,361	+758.5%^{1}
5	La Piedad	29,420	2,500	400	1,961	+55.6%^{14}
6	Chihuahua	18,100	4,000	400	1,645	−64.5%^{13}
7	Montañeses	23,700	3,000	500	1,394	−46.4%
8	Los Cabos United	19,050	2,000	200	1,191	+19.1%
9	Escorpiones Zacatepec	17,750	1,700	500	1,109	+446.3%^{2}
10	Alacranes de Durango	17,750	2,000	500	1,044	−51.8%^{3}
11	Cafetaleros de Chiapas	17,599	2,500	427	1,035	−34.1%
12	Racing Porto Palmeiras	16,500	1,500	500	1,031	n/a^{6}
13	Reynosa	14,452	2,000	200	850	n/a^{6}
14	Inter Playa del Carmen	12,850	2,100	350	756	+30.3%
15	Aguacateros de Peribán	10,380	2,500	80	649	n/a^{8}
16	Saltillo	10,870	3,000	200	639	+53.2%
17	Yalmakán	3,203	550	50	320	+33.3%^{12}
18	Real Apodaca	5,100	1,000	100	319	n/a^{6}
19	Colima	5,121	2,001	70	301	−11.5%
20	Calor	4,950	1,000	50	309	+71.7%^{4}
21	UAT	4,450	400	150	262	+21.9%
22	Tritones Vallarta	4,050	400	150	238	−51.2%
23	Lobos ULMX	3,780	700	80	236	+38.8%^{11}
24	Coras	3,550	500	100	222	−20.7%
25	Tecos	3,750	500	50	221	−54.2%
26	Halcones de Zapopan	3,200	600	100	221	+84.2%^{7}
27	Mineros de Fresnillo	3,020	350	50	207	+38.0%
28	Tuzos UAZ	2,480	800	80	207	−28.1%^{10}
29	Sporting Canamy	2,850	1,500	50	190	+111.1%
30	Atlético Aragón	2,980	500	50	186	n/a^{5}
31	Pioneros de Cancún	2,931	300	50	183	−21.5%^{4}
32	Deportiva Venados	2,750	300	50	162	+35.0%
33	Mexicali	2,370	450	70	148	−55.6%^{7}
34	Inter de Querétaro	1,340	200	50	103	−58.8%^{9}
35	Leones Negros	1,565	200	20	92	+5.7%
36	Cimarrones de Sonora	620	100	30	56	−55.2%
	League total	619,170	25,000	25	1,100	+7.3%

Source: Liga Premier FMF
Notes:
Only regular season listed
1: Petroleros de Salamanca played last season as Catedráticos Elite.
2: Escorpiones played last season at Cuernavaca
3: Durango played Liga de Expansión MX last season.
4: Team played Liga Premier – Serie B last season.
5: Team played Liga TDP last season.
6: Team did not play last season.
7: The team had at least one match canceled for administrative issues.
8: Aguacateros de Peribán played until Week 18 at Unidad Deportiva Hermanos López Rayón in Uruapan, because the Estadio Municipal de Peribán is undergoing improvement works, also the team played Liga TDP last season
9: Inter Querétaro played three matches outside its official stadium.
10: UAZ was penalized with five matches behind closed doors for violent incidents in the match against Tampico Madero corresponding to the first leg of the final of the 2022-23 season.
11: Lobos ULMX played the match against Irapuato (Week 19) behind closed doors because the team could not cover the security logistics necessary for the match .
12: Yalmakán only played the first half of the season
13: Chihuahua only played until Week 25
14: La Piedad was penalized with two matches behind closed doors for violent incidents in the match against Salamanca corresponding to the Week 29

==== Highest and lowest ====
Highest attended					Lowest attended			
Week	Home	Score	Away	Attendance	Home	Score	Away	Attendance
1	Tampico Madero	1–0	Irapuato	4,500	Atlético Aragón	1–0	Sporting Canamy	100
2	Irapuato	1–1	Lobos ULMX	7,500	Cimarrones de Sonora	0–1	Los Cabos United	50
3	Tampico Madero	0–0	Aguacateros de Peribán	3,000	Mineros de Fresnillo	4–2	Real Apodaca	100
4	Irapuato	0–0	Halcones de Zapopan	10,000	Cimarrones de Sonora	1–0	UAZ	100
5	Tampico Madero	0–0	Racing Porto Palmeiras	4,000	Cimarrones de Sonora	1–2	Saltillo	50
6	Irapuato	4–1	Pioneros de Cancún	10,000	Tecos	2–0	Colima	100
7	Tampico Madero	1–1	Escorpiones Zacatepec	5,000	Leones Negros	2–1	UAT	25
8	Irapuato	5–0	Sporting Canamy	7,000	Deportiva Venados	2–1	La Piedad	100
9	La Piedad	4–0	Tampico Madero	2,000	Cimarrones de Sonora	1–0	Reynosa	30
10	Irapuato	3–0	La Piedad	18,000	Tecos	2–0	Mexicali	50
11	Irapuato	0–0	Petroleros de Salamanca	25,000	Cimarrones de Sonora	1–1	Gavilanes de Matamoros	50
12	Tampico Madero	3–2	Halcones de Zapopan	5,001	Leones Negros	3–0	Mineros de Fresnillo	20
13	Irapuato	6–1	Inter Querétaro	14,000	Cimarrones de Sonora	1–4	Tecos	50
14	Tampico Madero	3–0	Pioneros de Cancún	7,000	Leones Negros	2–1	Los Cabos United	40
15	Irapuato	1–0	Cafetaleros de Chiapas	7,000	Yalmakán	2–0	Atlético Aragón	50
16	Gavilanes de Matamoros	0–1	Reynosa	2,500	Atlético Aragón	2–3	Pioneros de Cancún	50
17	Irapuato	1–0	Montañeses	12,000	Calor	1–0	Tritones Vallarta	50
18	Irapuato	4–2	Tampico Madero	15,000	Sporting Canamy	0–1	Atlético Aragón	50
19	Colima	0–1	Reynosa	2,001	Leones Negros	3–1	Real Apodaca	30
20	Irapuato	0–0	Atlético Aragón	8,000	Deportiva Venados	3–0	Halcones de Zapopan	50
21	Montañeses	1–1	Racing Porto Palmeiras	1,500	Leones Negros	5–0	Reynosa	50
22	Gavilanes de Matamoros	1–0	Tritones Vallarta	5,000	Sporting Canamy	0–0	Inter Playa	100
23	Tampico Madero	2–1	Cafetaleros de Chiapas	3,000	Cimarrones de Sonora	1–0	Calor	40
24	Irapuato	0–0	Inter Playa	10,000	Colima	2–4	Tuzos UAZ	70
25	Tampico Madero	4–1	Montañeses	7,500	Mexicali	0–1	Gavilanes de Matamoros	50
26	Irapuato	2–0	Deportiva Venados	9,000	Inter Querétaro	1–0	Pioneros de Cancún	70
27	La Piedad	0–1	Irapuato	5,000	Sporting Canamy	1–2	Aguacateros de Peribán	50
28	Tampico Madero	6–0	Atlético Aragón	8,500	Inter Querétaro	1–7	Sporting Canamy	50
29	Irapuato	2–2	Aguacateros de Peribán	10,000	Mexicali	1–2	Tritones Vallarta	100
30	Gavilanes de Matamoros	1–0	Calor	3,500	Inter Querétaro	0–5	Irapuato	100
31	Irapuato	0–1	Racing Porto Palmeiras	14,500	Cimarrones de Sonora	2–1	Colima	50
32	Gavilanes de Matamoros	2–0	Coras	6,000	Lobos ULMX	5–0	Pioneros de Cancún	80
33	Irapuato	1–1	Escorpiones Zacatepec	10,500	Sporting Canamy	0–2	Tampico Madero	50
34	Tampico Madero	2–0	Deportiva Venados	8,500	Colima	0–6	Real Apodaca	100

Source: Liga Premier FMF

1. Does not include matches played behind closed doors.

== Liguilla ==
=== Liguilla de Ascenso ===
As of this season, a regionalization of the promotion play-offs will be implemented, the teams will only play against clubs from their group, except in the season finale. The winners of each group will qualify for the semifinals, while the teams ranked between second and seventh place will play the reclassification. The higher seeded teams play on their home field during the second leg. The winner of each match up is determined by aggregate score. In the reclassification, semifinals and group final, if the two teams are tied on aggregate the higher seeded team advances. In the season final, if the two teams are tied after both legs, the match goes to extra time and, if necessary, a penalty shoot-out.

==== Reclassification ====
The first legs were played on 1 May, and the second legs were played on 4 May 2024.

Team 1	Agg.	Team 2	1st leg	2nd leg
Alacranes de Durango	6–0	Tritones Vallarta	1–0	5–0
Gavilanes de Matamoros	2–1	Reynosa	1–0	1–1
Tecos	5–1	Tuzos UAZ	3–1	2–0
Tampico Madero	3–1	Inter Playa del Carmen	1–0	2–1
Deportiva Venados	3–1	Petroleros de Salamanca	0–1	3–0
Irapuato	4–1	Aguacateros de Peribán	2–1	2–0

First leg

1 May 2024	Tritones Vallarta	0–1	Alacranes de Durango	Bahía de Banderas, Nayarit
16:30 CST (UTC−6)		Report	Mejía 5'	Stadium: Ciudad Deportiva Bahía de Banderas; Attendance: 900; Referee: Oscar Guajardo Medina

1 May 2024	Aguacateros de Peribán	1–2	Irapuato	Peribán, Michoacán
17:00 CST (UTC−6)	Valencia 36'	Report	Hernández 36'; González 82'	Stadium: Estadio Municipal de Peribán; Attendance: 2,000; Referee: Carlos Jesús Gaytán Durán

1 May 2024	Inter Playa del Carmen	0–1	Tampico Madero	Playa del Carmen, Quintana Roo
18:00 EST (UTC−5)		Report	Lozano 60'	Stadium: Estadio Mario Villanueva Madrid; Attendance: 1,500; Referee: Jaime Orlando Montes Santos

1 May 2024	Tuzos UAZ	1–3	Tecos	Zacatecas City, Zacatecas
19:00 CST (UTC−6)	Villa 53'	Report	Padilla 21'; González 28'; Casillas 82'	Stadium: Estadio Carlos Vega Villalba; Attendance: 1,500; Referee: José Luis Alba Dorado

1 May 2024	Petroleros de Salamanca	1–0	Deportiva Venados	Salamanca, Guanajuato
19:15 CST (UTC−6)	Alvarado 71'	Report		Stadium: Estadio Sección XXIV; Attendance: 4,500; Referee: Jorge Carlos Ortiz León

1 May 2024	Reynosa	0–1	Gavilanes de Matamoros	Reynosa, Tamaulipas
20:00 CDT (UTC−5)		Report	Villanueva 74'	Stadium: Unidad Deportiva Solidaridad; Attendance: 4,700; Referee: Julio César Gil Jiménez

Second leg

4 May 2024	Deportiva Venados	3–0 (3–1 agg.)	Petroleros de Salamanca	Tamanché, Yucatán
11:00 CST (UTC−6)	García 23', 61'; Micolta 51'	Report		Stadium: Estadio Alonso Diego Molina; Attendance: 100; Referee: Fernando Alexander Cruz Garatachea

4 May 2024	Alacranes de Durango	6–0 (7–0 agg.)	Tritones Vallarta	Durango City, Durango
18:00 CST (UTC−6)	Padilla 21', 24'; Mejía 32', 34'; Lozano 39'; Ocón 50'	Report		Stadium: Estadio Francisco Zarco; Attendance: 5,000; Referee: Rosario Guadalupe Cárdenas Morales

4 May 2024	Tecos	2–0 (5–1 agg.)	Tuzos UAZ	Zapopan, Jalisco
18:00 CST (UTC−6)	Casillas 32'; Valdivia 85'	Report		Stadium: Estadio Tres de Marzo; Attendance: 500; Referee: Rafael Heras Villa

4 May 2024	Gavilanes de Matamoros	1–1 (2–1 agg.)	Reynosa	Matamoros, Tamaulipas
19:00 CDT (UTC−5)	Castañeda 34'	Report	Briseño 4'	Stadium: Estadio El Hogar; Attendance: 11,000; Referee: Eduardo Reynoso Martínez

4 May 2024	Tampico Madero	2–1 (3–1 agg.)	Inter Playa del Carmen	Tampico and Ciudad Madero, Tamaulipas
19:00 CST (UTC−6)	Peñaloza 75', 85'	Report	Meza 54'	Stadium: Estadio Tamaulipas; Attendance: 8,000; Referee: Jesús Enrique Herrera Armenta

4 May 2024	Irapuato	2–0 (4–1 agg.)	Aguacateros de Peribán	Irapuato, Guanajuato
19:00 CST (UTC−6)	Sosa 35'; Araujo 62'	Report		Stadium: Estadio Sergio León Chávez; Attendance: 14,000; Referee: Gerardo Yahir Mendoza Sánchez

==== Bracket ====
Group Semi-finals
1A	Los Cabos United	1	4	5
4A	Tecos	1	0	1
2A	Alacranes de Durango (s)	2	1	3
3A	Gavilanes de Matamoros	3	0	3
1B	Racing Porto Palmeiras (s)	1	1	2
4B	Irapuato	2	0	1
2B	Tampico Madero (s)	0	1	1
3B	Deportiva Venados	0	1	1

Group Finals
1A	Los Cabos United	1	0	1
2A	Alacranes de Durango	0	0	0
1B	Racing Porto Palmeiras	0	2	2
2B	Tampico Madero	1	2	3

Season Final
1A	Los Cabos United	0	1	1
2B	Tampico Madero	3	1	4

===== Group Semi-finals =====
The first legs were played on 8 May, and the second legs were played on 11 May 2024.

Team 1	Agg.	Team 2	1st leg	2nd leg
Racing Porto Palmeiras	(s) 2–2	Irapuato	1–2	1–0
Tampico Madero	(s) 1–1	Deportiva Venados	0–0	1–1
Los Cabos United	5–1	Tecos	1–1	4–0
Alacranes de Durango	(s) 3–3	Gavilanes de Matamoros	2–3	1–0

First leg

8 May 2024	Deportiva Venados	0–0	Tampico Madero	Tamanché, Yucatán
11:00 CST (UTC−6)		Report		Stadium: Estadio Alonso Diego Molina; Attendance: 50; Referee: Gerardo Yahir Mendoza Sánchez

8 May 2024	Tecos	1–1	Los Cabos United	Zapopan, Jalisco
18:00 CST (UTC−6)	Casillas 45'	Report	Díaz 34'	Stadium: Estadio Tres de Marzo; Attendance: 500; Referee: Rosario Guadalupe Cárdenas Morales

8 May 2024	Gavilanes de Matamoros	3–2	Alacranes de Durango	Matamoros, Tamaulipas
20:00 CDT (UTC−5)	Castañeda 12'; Suárez 19'; González 72'	Report	Mejía 69'; Muñoz 74'	Stadium: Estadio El Hogar; Attendance: 7,200; Referee: Fernando Alexander Cruz Garatachea

8 May 2024	Irapuato	2–1	Racing Porto Palmeiras	Irapuato, Guanajuato
20:00 CST (UTC−6)	Ruiz 50'; Araujo 51'	Report	Pastrana 45+3'	Stadium: Estadio Sergio León Chávez; Attendance: 10,000; Referee: Jorge Carlos Ortiz León

Second leg

11 May 2024	Racing Porto Palmeiras	1–0 (2–2 agg.)	Irapuato	Boca del Río, Veracruz
19:00 CST (UTC−6)	Hernández 76'	Report		Stadium: Unidad Deportiva Hugo Sánchez; Attendance: 1,000; Referee: José Luis Alba Dorado

11 May 2024	Tampico Madero	1–1 (1–1 agg.)	Deportiva Venados	Tampico and Ciudad Madero, Tamaulipas
19:00 CST (UTC−6)	Martínez 38'	Report	García 61'	Stadium: Estadio Tamaulipas; Attendance: 12,500; Referee: Oscar Guajardo Medina

11 May 2024	Alacranes de Durango	1–0 (3–3 agg.)	Gavilanes de Matamoros	Durango City, Durango
19:00 CST (UTC−6)	Macías 76' (own)	Report		Stadium: Estadio Francisco Zarco; Attendance: 4,000; Referee: Carlos Iván Trejo Saldívar

11 May 2024	Los Cabos United	4–0 (5–1 agg.)	Tecos	Cabo San Lucas, Baja California Sur
20:00 MST (UTC−7)	Ríos 40'; Corona 41'; Medina 49'; Andrey 57'	Report		Stadium: Complejo Deportivo Don Koll; Attendance: 2,200; Referee: Julio César Gil Jiménez

===== Group Finals =====
The first legs were played on 15 May, and the second legs were played on 18 May 2024.

Team 1	Agg.	Team 2	1st leg	2nd leg
Racing Porto Palmeiras	2–3	Tampico Madero	0–1	2–2
Los Cabos United	1–0	Alacranes de Durango	1–0	0–0

First leg

15 May 2024	Alacranes de Durango	0–1	Los Cabos United	Durango City, Durango
20:00 CST (UTC−6)		Report	Ríos 9'	Stadium: Estadio Francisco Zarco; Attendance: 6,350; Referee: Jaime Orlando Montes Santos

15 May 2024	Tampico Madero	1–0	Racing Porto Palmeiras	Tampico and Ciudad Madero, Tamaulipas
21:00 CST (UTC−6)	Angulo 45+10' (pen.)	Report		Stadium: Estadio Tamaulipas; Attendance: 15,000; Referee: Rafael Heras Villa

Second leg

18 May 2024	Racing Porto Palmeiras	2–2 (2–3 agg.)	Tampico Madero	Boca del Río, Veracruz
19:00 CST (UTC−6)	Rodríguez 50', 90+1'	Report	Peñaloza 11', 16'	Stadium: Unidad Deportiva Hugo Sánchez; Attendance: 1,000; Referee: Eduardo Reynoso Martínez

18 May 2024	Los Cabos United	0–0 (1–0 agg.)	Alacranes de Durango	Cabo San Lucas, Baja California Sur
20:00 MST (UTC−7)		Report		Stadium: Complejo Deportivo Don Koll; Attendance: 2,200; Referee: Jesús Enrique Herrera Armenta

===== Season Final =====
The Season Final is a series of matches played to determine the winning team of the promotion to Liga de Expansión MX, as long as the winning team meets the league requirements.

The first leg was played on 22 May, and the second leg was played on 25 May 2024.

Team 1	Agg.	Team 2	1st leg	2nd leg
Los Cabos United	1–4	Tampico Madero	0–3	1–1

First leg

22 May 2024
20:00 CST (UTC−6)

Tampico Madero	3–0	Los Cabos United
Muñoz 32'; Martínez 75'; Ramos 90+3' (pen.)	Report

Estadio Tamaulipas, Tampico and Ciudad Madero, Tamaulipas
Attendance: 10,000
Referee: Fernando Alexander Cruz Garatachea

Tampico Madero	Los Cabos United

1	GK	(Mexico) Sebastián Huerta
16	DF	(Mexico) Rubén Domínguez
24	DF	(Mexico) Jesús Hernández	(substituted off) 30'
4	DF	(Mexico) David Navarro	(substituted off) 71'
5	DF	(Mexico) Néstor González
22	MF	(Mexico) Alberto Ríos
8	MF	(Mexico) Benjamín Muñoz
10	MF	(Mexico) Omar Soto	(substituted off) 50'
15	FW	(Mexico) Omar Vidaña	(substituted off) 50'
25	FW	(Colombia) Kevin Peñaloza
27	FW	(Colombia) Juan David Angulo	(substituted off) 71'
Substitutions:
12	GK	(Mexico) Alan Flores
3	DF	(Mexico) Emmanuel Rivera
21	DF	(Mexico) David Oteo	(substituted on) 30'
19	MF	(Mexico) Francisco Martínez	(substituted on) 50'
9	FW	(Mexico) Alan Ramos	(substituted on) 71'
11	FW	(Mexico) Axel García
17	FW	(Mexico) Brian Domínguez	(substituted on) 50'
18	FW	(Mexico) Bryan Lozano	(substituted on) 71'
23	FW	(Mexico) Sergio Rodríguez
26	FW	(Mexico) Alberto García
Manager:
(Mexico) Gastón Obledo

1	GK	(Mexico) Luis López
6	DF	(Mexico) Carlos Enciso
4	DF	(Mexico) Jorge Cruz
3	DF	(Mexico) Alan Zubiri	(yellow card) 90+2'
18	DF	(Mexico) Axel Cruz
25	MF	(Mexico) Néstor Díaz
10	MF	(Mexico) Néstor Corona		(substituted off) 72'
15	MF	(Mexico) Jesús Medina		(substituted off) 65'
11	FW	(Brazil) Andrey
9	FW	(Mexico) José Ríos		(substituted off) 83'
30	FW	(Mexico) Beline Toledo		(substituted off) 83'
Substitutions:
31	GK	(Mexico) Jesús Peinado
5	DF	(Mexico) Brandon Fernández
2	DF	(Mexico) Ramón Cano
16	MF	(Mexico) David Salinas
20	MF	(Mexico) Luis Escalante
21	MF	(Mexico) Christian Martínez		(substituted on) 72'
29	MF	(Mexico) Samuel Solís		(substituted on) 83'
32	MF	(Mexico) Efrén Sánchez		(substituted on) 65'
14	FW	(Mexico) Julio Rangel		(substituted on) 83'
7	FW	(Mexico) Jorge Gámez
Manager:
(Chile) Rodrigo Ruiz

Second leg

25 May 2024
20:00 MST (UTC−7)

Los Cabos United	1–1	Tampico Madero
Corona 79'	Report	Angulo 55' (pen.)

Complejo Deportivo Don Koll, Cabo San Lucas, Baja California Sur
Attendance: 2,000
Referee: Rosario Guadalupe Cárdenas Morales

Los Cabos United	Tampico Madero

1	GK	(Mexico) Luis López
3	DF	(Mexico) Alan Zubiri
4	DF	(Mexico) Jorge Cruz	(yellow card) 54'
18	DF	(Mexico) Áxel Cruz		(substituted off) 68'
6	DF	(Mexico) Carlos Enciso
10	MF	(Mexico) Néstor Corona
25	MF	(Mexico) Néstor Díaz	(yellow card) 30'	(substituted off) 79'
15	MF	(Mexico) Jesús Medina		(substituted off) 56'
9	FW	(Mexico) José Ríos
14	FW	(Mexico) Julio Rangel	(yellow card) 13'
11	FW	(Brazil) Andrey
Substitutions:
31	GK	(Mexico) Jesús Peinado
2	DF	(Mexico) Ramón Cano
5	DF	(Mexico) Brandon Fernández
16	MF	(Mexico) David Salinas
20	MF	(Mexico) Luis Escalante
21	MF	(Mexico) Christian Martínez		(substituted on) 56'
29	MF	(Mexico) Samuel Solís
30	MF	(Mexico) Beline Toledo		(substituted on) 79'
32	MF	(Mexico) Efrén Sánchez		(substituted on) 68'
7	FW	(Mexico) Jorge Gámez
Manager:
(Chile) Rodrigo Ruiz

1	GK	(Mexico) Sebastián Huerta
21	DF	(Mexico) David Oteo
5	DF	(Mexico) Néstor González	(yellow card) 69'
22	DF	(Mexico) Alberto Ríos	(yellow card) 50'
4	DF	(Mexico) David Navarro
16	MF	(Mexico) Rubén Domínguez	(yellow card) 32'
8	MF	(Mexico) Benjamín Muñoz
10	MF	(Mexico) Omar Soto
18	FW	(Mexico) Mauricio Lozano
27	FW	(Colombia) Kevin Peñaloza
25	FW	(Colombia) Juan David Angulo	(yellow card) 55'
Substitutions:
12	GK	(Mexico) Alan Flores
3	DF	(Mexico) Emmanuel Rivera
24	DF	(Mexico) Jesús Hernández		(substituted on) 71'
32	DF	(Mexico) Josué Hernández
15	MF	(Mexico) Omar Vidaña		(substituted on) 77'
19	MF	(Mexico) Francisco Martínez		(substituted on) 71'
9	FW	(Mexico) Alan Ramos		(substituted on) 89'
17	FW	(Mexico) Brian Domínguez		(substituted on) 89'
23	FW	(Mexico) Sergio Rodríguez
26	FW	(Mexico) Alberto García
Manager:
(Mexico) Gastón Obledo

2023–24 winners

4th title

=== Liguilla de Filiales ===
The four best reserve teams of the season play two games against each other on a home-and-away basis. The higher seeded teams play on their home field during the second leg. The winner of each match up is determined by aggregate score. In the semifinals, if the two teams are tied on aggregate the higher seeded team advances. In the final, if the two teams are tied after both legs, the match goes to extra time and, if necessary, a penalty shoot-out.

Semi–finals
2	Leones Negros	0	0	1
3	Cimarrones de Sonora	1	1	2
1	UAT	0	2	2
4	Mineros de Fresnillo	2	1	3

Final
3	Cimarrones de Sonora	0	3	3
4	Mineros de Fresnillo	2	0	2

==== Semi–finals ====
The first legs were played on 1 May, and the second legs were played on 4 May 2024.

Team 1	Agg.	Team 2	1st leg	2nd leg
UAT	2–3	Mineros de Fresnillo	0–2	2–1
Leones Negros	0–2	Cimarrones de Sonora	0–1	0–1

First leg

1 May 2024	Mineros de Fresnillo	2–0	UAT	Zacatecas City, Zacatecas
12:00 CST (UTC−6)	Piñón 39', 65'	Report		Stadium: Estadio Carlos Vega Villalba; Attendance: 200; Referee: José Andrés Elías Zarzoza

1 May 2024	Cimarrones de Sonora	1–0	Leones Negros	Hermosillo, Sonora
18:00 MST (UTC−7)	Coronado 31'	Report		Stadium: Estadio Héroe de Nacozari; Attendance: 133; Referee: Abraham Guadalupe Espinoza Serrano

Second leg

4 May 2024	UAT	2–1 (2–3 agg.)	Mineros de Fresnillo	Ciudad Victoria, Tamaulipas
11:00 CST (UTC−6)	Medellín 20'; Eguía 68'		Rodríguez 87'	Stadium: Estadio Marte R. Gómez; Attendance: 1,000; Referee: Carlos Iván Trejo Saldívar

4 May 2024	Leones Negros	0–1 (0–2 agg.)	Cimarrones de Sonora	Zapopan, Jalisco
11:00 CST (UTC−6)		Report	Solórzano 46'	Stadium: Club Deportivo La Primavera; Attendance: 250; Referee: Adrián Chafino García

==== Final ====
The first leg was played on 9 May, and the second leg was played on 12 May 2024.

Team 1	Agg.	Team 2	1st leg	2nd leg
Cimarrones de Sonora	3–2	Mineros de Fresnillo	0–2	3–0

First leg

9 May 2024	Mineros de Fresnillo	2–0	Cimarrones de Sonora	Fresnillo, Zacatecas
18:00 CST (UTC−6)	Blanco 22'; Castillo 40'	Report		Stadium: Unidad Deportiva Minera Fresnillo; Attendance: 1,200; Referee: Iván Alberto Salazar Hernández

Second leg

12 May 2024	Cimarrones de Sonora	3–0 (3–2 agg.)	Mineros de Fresnillo	Hermosillo, Sonora
18:00 MST (UTC−7)	Solórzano 3'; Talavera 17'; Navarro 19'	Report		Stadium: Estadio Héroe de Nacozari; Attendance: 800; Referee: Alfredo Huerta López

2023–24 Reserves teams winners

1st title

== Coefficient table ==
P	Team	Pts	G	Pts/G	GD
1	Racing Porto Palmeiras	77	32	2.406	+28
2	Los Cabos United	71	32	2.219	+28
3	Alacranes de Durango	67	32	2.094	+31
4	Tampico Madero	67	32	2.094	+30
5	Deportiva Venados	62	32	1.938	+14
6	Irapuato	57	32	1.781	+31
7	Aguacateros de Peribán	57	32	1.781	+19
8	Gavilanes de Matamoros	57	32	1.781	+13
9	UAT	57	32	1.781	+1
10	Petroleros de Salamanca	56	32	1.750	+12
11	Inter Playa del Carmen	56	32	1.750	+10
12	Montañeses	56	32	1.750	+5
13	Escorpiones Zacatepec	54	32	1.688	+9
14	Tecos	53	32	1.656	+18
15	Leones Negros	52	32	1.625	+2
16	Cimarrones de Sonora	48	32	1.500	+1
17	Tuzos UAZ	47	32	1.469	+8
18	La Piedad	47	32	1.469	+4
19	Reynosa	47	32	1.469	+2
20	Cafetaleros de Chiapas	47	32	1.469	+2
22	Tritones Vallarta	46	32	1.438	+6
21	Saltillo	46	32	1.438	–1
23	Real Apodaca	45	32	1.406	+1
24	Mineros de Fresnillo	40	32	1.250	–3
25	Pioneros de Cancún	37	32	1.156	–15
26	Calor	37	32	1.156	–19
27	Lobos ULMX	34	32	1.063	–18
28	Halcones de Zapopan	32	32	1.000	–9
29	Sporting Canamy	29	32	0.906	–18
30	Mexicali	29	32	0.906	–34
31	Colima	25	32	0.781	–31
32	Atlético Aragón	25	32	0.781	–32
33	Coras	21	32	0.656	–23
34	Inter Querétaro	10	32	0.313	–72

Last updated: April 28, 2024
Source: Liga Premier FMF
P = Position; G = Games played; Pts = Points; Pts/G = Ratio of points to games played; GD = Goal difference

== See also ==
- 2023–24 Liga MX season
- 2023–24 Liga de Expansión MX season
- 2023–24 Serie B de México season
- 2023–24 Liga TDP season
- 2024 Copa Conecta
