= Beline Toledo =

Mexican footballer (born 2002)

Personal information
- Full name: Beline Toledo Ovando
- Date of birth: 13 February 2002 (age 24)
- Place of birth: Tuxtla Gutiérrez, Chiapas, Mexico
- Height: 1.73 m (5 ft 8 in)
- Position: Midfielder

Team information
- Current team: Real Apodaca
- Number: 13

Youth career
- 2018–2020: Leones Negros UdeG

Senior career*
Years	Team	Apps	(Gls)
2020–2023	Leones Negros UdeG	4	(0)
2020–2023	→ Leones Negros UdeG Premier (loan)	41	(0)
2023–2024	Los Cabos United	29	(0)
2024–	Real Apodaca	1	(0)
- * Club domestic league appearances and goals as of 15 September 2024(UTC)

Beline Toledo Ovando (born 13 February 2002) is a Mexican professional footballer who plays as a midfielder for Liga Premier de México club Real Apodaca.

== Club career ==
Toledo was first called up to the UdeG first team in January 2019, and was an unused substitute during three Copa MX matches. He was officially promoted to the first team the following season, playing in several pre-season friendlies in July 2019. He made his professional debut later that month, coming on for Alan Murillo during the second half of a Copa MX match against C.F. Monterrey on 31 July. Two weeks later, during a Copa MX defeat to Cafetaleros de Chiapas, he received a yellow card in his second appearance.

== Career statistics ==
=== Club ===
As of 28 March 2019.

Club	Season	League			Cup		Continental		Other		Total	
Club	Season	Division	Apps	Goals	Apps	Goals	Apps	Goals	Apps	Goals	Apps	Goals
Leones Negros	2019–20	Ascenso MX	0	0	2 (Note: Appearances in the Copa MX)	0	–		0	0	2	0
Career total			0	0	2	0	0	0	0	0	2	0
