= Andrey (footballer, born November 1998) =

Brazilian footballer

Personal information
- Full name: Andrey Marcos Andrade Pereira
- Date of birth: 28 November 1998 (age 27)
- Place of birth: Montes Claros, Brazil
- Height: 1.71 m (5 ft 7 1/2 in)
- Position: Midfielder

Team information
- Current team: Oaxaca
- Number: 11

Youth career
- 2018: Elosport

Senior career*
Years	Team	Apps	(Gls)
2018–2021	UdeG	31	(1)
2022–2024	Los Cabos United	47	(13)
2024–2025	Real Apodaca	28	(17)
2025	Oaxaca	12	(2)
2026	Real Apodaca	13	(4)
2026–	Oaxaca	0	(0)
- * Club domestic league appearances and goals as of 01:18, 25 July 2026 (UTC)

Andrey Marcos Andrade Pereira (born 28 November 1998), commonly known as Andrey, is a Brazilian footballer who currently plays as a midfielder for Liga de Expansión MX club Oaxaca.

== Career statistics ==
=== Club ===
As of 28 March 2019

Club	Season	League			Cup		Continental		Other		Total	
Club	Season	Division	Apps	Goals	Apps	Goals	Apps	Goals	Apps	Goals	Apps	Goals
Leones Negros	2018–19	Ascenso MX	6	0	2 (Note: Appearances in the Copa MX)	0	–		0	0	8	0
Career total			6	0	2	0	0	0	0	0	8	0
