= Alan Murillo =

Mexican footballer (born 2002)

Personal information
- Full name: Alan Daniel Murillo Orozco
- Date of birth: 28 January 2002 (age 24)
- Place of birth: Zapopan, Mexico
- Height: 1.71 m (5 ft 7 in)
- Position: Forward

Team information
- Current team: UdeG Premier (on loan from UdeG)
- Number: 98

Youth career
- 2015–2020: Leones Negros UdeG

Senior career*
| Years | Team | Apps | (Gls) |
| 2020– | Leones Negros UdeG | 2 | (0) |
| 2020– | → Leones Negros UdeG Premier (loan) | 32 | (1) |
- * Club domestic league appearances and goals as of 18:44, 20 April 2019 (UTC)

Alan Daniel Murillo Orozco (born 28 January 2002) is a Mexican footballer who currently plays as a forward for Universidad Guadalajara.

== Career statistics ==
=== Club ===
As of 20 April 2019.

| Club | Season | League | | | Cup | | Continental | | Other | | Total | |
| Club | Season | Division | Apps | Goals | Apps | Goals | Apps | Goals | Apps | Goals | Apps | Goals |
|---|---|---|---|---|---|---|---|---|---|---|---|---|
| Universidad Guadalajara Premier | 2018–19 | Tercera División | 55 | 19 | – | | – | | 0 | 0 | 55 | 19 |
| Universidad Guadalajara | 2018–19 | Ascenso MX | 0 | 0 | 1 (Note: Appearances in the Copa MX) | 0 | – | | 0 | 0 | 1 | 0 |
| Career total | | | 55 | 19 | 1 | 0 | 0 | 0 | 0 | 0 | 56 | 19 |
