= C.F. Orgullo Reynosa =

Mexican association football club

C.F. Reynosa
- Full name: Club de Fútbol Orgullo de Reynosa
- Nickname: Los Compas
- Founded: 13 June 2023; 3 years ago
- Dissolved: 28 June 2024; 2 years ago
- Ground: Unidad Deportiva Solidaridad; Reynosa, Tamaulipas, Mexico
- Capacity: 20,000
- Owner: DaVinci Sports Group
- Chairman: Fabián Ramírez
- Manager: Édgar Barrón
- League: Liga Premier de México - Serie A
- 2023–24: 9th, Group I (Reclassification)
Home colours	Away colours

Club de Fútbol Reynosa was a Mexican professional football team based in Reynosa, Tamaulipas that played in the Liga Premier de México (Serie A) during the 2023–24 season.

== History ==
In 2020, the city of Reynosa was left without representation in Mexican soccer after the dissolution of Atlético Reynosa, a team that played in the third–tier of Mexican football. Later, some teams from the city emerged in the Liga TDP, the fourth division of Mexican football, although without popular repercussion.

In May 2023, Alebrijes UABJO won the Serie B de México (4th division), thus obtaining promotion to the Serie A (3rd division). However, as this team served solely as the "B" team of Alebrijes de Oaxaca, it had to be sold due to a lack of budget to maintain it in that division.

On June 15, 2023, it was announced that a group of businessmen bought Alebrijes UABJO, and the team was relocated to the city of Reynosa as Club de Fútbol Reynosa. The club's owner was DaVinci Sports Group, a private company specialized in sports investments, which is also a shareholder of CF Lorca Deportiva in Spain.

The first players on the team were footballers from Alebrijes UABJO. On June 30, 2023, it was announced that the team was officially named C.F. Orgullo de Reynosa due to administrative technicalities. Fabián Ramírez was appointed Executive President of the club at the age of 22, while Juan Carlos Román was named Sporting Director.

In their first, and only season, the team managed to qualify for the play-offs characterized by solid goalkeeping and defensive performances. However, they were eliminated in the first round by Gavilanes de Matamoros.

On June 28, 2024, C.F. Reynosa was put on hiatus by its board due to a lack of interest and sponsors to help cover the team's operating expenses in the Liga Premier. The team was not reactivated for the 2025–26 season and was officially dissolved in accordance with the regulations.
