= Ahuizotl Sánchez =

Mexican footballer and manager (born 1962)

Personal information
- Full name: Ahuizotl Sánchez Talamantes
- Date of birth: 16 September 1962 (age 64)
- Place of birth: La Yesca, Nayarit
- Height: 1.73 m (5 ft 8 in)
- Position: Defender

Senior career*
Years	Team	Apps	(Gls)
1986–1990	UdeG	24	(0)
1990–1991	Atlético Morelia	13	(0)

Managerial career
- 2003: Querétaro (Assistant)
- 2004: Delfines de Coatzacoalcos (Assistant)
- 2007–2008: Guerreros de Tabasco
- 2013: Atlético Cocula
- 2013–2014: Vaqueros
- 2016: Leones Negros UdeG Reserves and Academy
- 2016–2017: Cachorros UdeG
- 2017–2018: Leones Negros UdeG Premier
- 2020–2021: Leones Negros UdeG TDP
- 2022–2024: Leones Negros UdeG Premier
- * Club domestic league appearances and goals

Ahuizotl Sánchez Talamantes (born September 16, 1962) is a Mexican football manager and former player.
