= Alexis Coronado =

Mexican footballer (born 1997)

Personal information
- Full name: Alexis Tohani Coronado Valenzuela
- Date of birth: 10 January 1997 (age 29)
- Place of birth: Hermosillo, Sonora, Mexico
- Height: 1.75 m (5 ft 9 in)
- Position: Midfielder

Team information
- Current team: Cimarrones de Sonora
- Number: 2

Youth career
- 2014–2016: Poblado Miguel Alemán FC

Senior career*
Years	Team	Apps	(Gls)
2016–2021	Cimarrones de Sonora	41	(0)
2021	Alebrijes de Oaxaca	5	(0)
2022–2023	Tritones Vallarta	20	(0)
2023–2024	Cimarrones de Sonora	0	(0)
2023–2024	→ Sonora Premier	29	(2)
2024	Jaguares	13	(1)
2025–	Cimarrones de Sonora	2	(0)
- * Club domestic league appearances and goals as of 9 September 2024

Alexis Tohani Coronado Valenzuela (born January 10, 1997) is a Mexican professional footballer who plays as a midfielder.
