= Edson Alvarado =

Mexican footballer (born 1975)

Personal information
- Full name: Edson Antonio Alvarado García
- Date of birth: 27 September 1975 (age 51)
- Place of birth: Mexico City, Mexico
- Position: Forward

Team information
- Current team: Los Cabos United (Manager)

Senior career*
Years	Team	Apps	(Gls)
1994–1998	Necaxa	90	(5)
1998–1999	Tigres UANL	26	(3)
1999	C.F. Monterrey	5	(0)
1999–2000	Santos Laguna	14	(2)
2000–2001	Tecos UAG	11	(1)
2001	Santos Laguna	4	(0)
2002	Tecos UAG	7	(0)
2002	Necaxa	5	(0)
2003	Lagartos de Tabasco	6	(0)
Total		168	(11)

International career
1995–1996	Mexico U23		
1996	Mexico	1	(0)

Managerial career
- 2009–2012: Estudiantes Tecos Academy (Assistant)
- 2013: Estudiantes Tecos
- 2014–2015: Mineros de Zacatecas Academy
- 2020: Alebrijes de Oaxaca (Assistant)
- 2022–2024: Los Cabos United (Assistant)
- 2024–: Los Cabos United
- * Club domestic league appearances and goals

Edson Antonio Alvarado García (born 27 September 1975) is a Mexican former footballer, who represented Mexico at the 1996 Summer Olympics. He was born in Mexico City.

== Clubs ==
- 1994-1998 : (Mexico) Club Necaxa
- 1998-1999 : (Mexico) UANL Tigres
- 1999 : (Mexico) CF Monterrey
- 1999-2000 : (Mexico) Santos Laguna
- 2000-2001 : (Mexico) Tecos UAG
- 2001 : (Mexico) Santos Laguna
- 2002 : (Mexico) Tecos UAG
- 2002 : (Mexico) Club Necaxa
- 2003 : (Mexico) Lagartos Tabasco Villahermosa

== Honours ==
Mexico

- Pan American Games Silver Medal: 1995
