= Santiago Micolta =

Ecuadorian football player (born 2000)

Personal information
- Full name: Santiago Daniel Micolta Lastra
- Date of birth: 26 May 2000 (age 26)
- Place of birth: Machala, Ecuador
- Height: 1.78 m (5 ft 10 in)
- Position: Forward

Team information
- Current team: Deportiva Venados
- Number: 19

Youth career
- 2012: Audaz Octubrino
- 2012–2017: Fuerza Amarilla

Senior career*
| Years | Team | Apps | (Gls) |
| 2017–2018 | Fuerza Amarilla | 1 | (0) |
| 2018–2019 | Unión La Calera | 4 | (0) |
| 2019–2020 | Aucas | 1 | (0) |
| 2020–2021 | Toreros F.C. | 1 | (0) |
| 2021–2022 | Tampico Madero | 13 | (0) |
| 2022– | Deportiva Venados | 99 | (46) |

International career^{‡}
| 2017 | Ecuador U17 | 9 | (2) |
- * Club domestic league appearances and goals as of 04:36, 15 May 2026 (UTC) ‡ National team caps and goals as of 18:11, 7 January 2019 (UTC)

Santiago Daniel Micolta Lastra (born 26 May 2000) is an Ecuadorian footballer who plays as a forward for the Mexican Primera Premier side Deportiva Venados.

== Career statistics ==
=== Club ===
As of 7 January 2019.

| Club | Season | League | | | Cup | | Continental | | Other | | Total | |
| Club | Season | Division | Apps | Goals | Apps | Goals | Apps | Goals | Apps | Goals | Apps | Goals |
|---|---|---|---|---|---|---|---|---|---|---|---|---|
| Fuerza Amarilla | 2017 | Ecuadorian Serie A | 1 | 0 | 0 | 0 | 0 | 0 | 0 | 0 | 1 | 0 |
| Unión La Calera | 2018 | Chilean Primera División | 4 | 0 | 3 (Note: Appearances in the Copa Chile) | 0 | – | | 0 | 0 | 7 | 0 |
| Career total | | | 5 | 0 | 3 | 0 | 0 | 0 | 0 | 0 | 8 | 0 |
