= Unidad Deportiva Solidaridad =

Stadium in Reynosa, Tamaulipas, Mexico

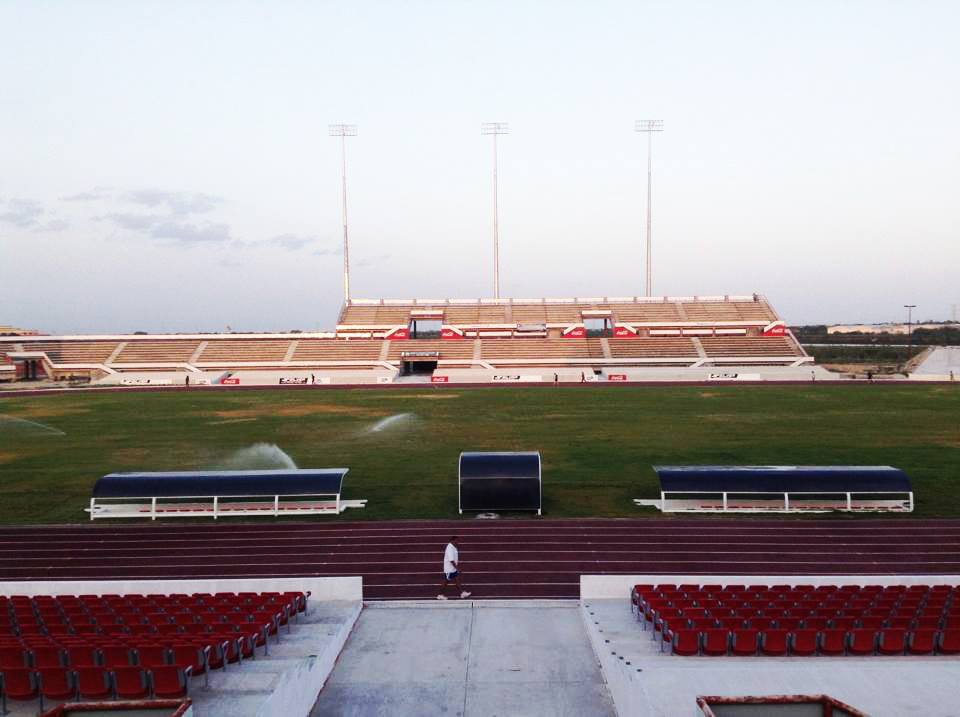
- Interactive map of Unidad Deportiva Solidaridad
- Full name: Estadio Reynosa de la Unidad Deportiva Solidaridad
- Location: Reynosa, Tamaulipas, Mexico
- Coordinates: 26°02′39″N 98°17′06″W
- Owner: Reynosa City Council
- Capacity: 15,000
- Surface: Natural grass

Construction
- Opened: September 27, 2014

Tenants
- Reynosa F.C. (2014–2017); Topos de Reynosa (2014–2015); Atlético Reynosa (2017–2020); Mineros Reynosa (2021–2023); Guerreros Reynosa (2022–2023); Orgullo Reynosa (2023–2024); Calor de Reynosa (2025–2026); Vaqueros Reynosa (2026–present)

The Unidad Deportiva Solidaridad is a multi-use stadium in Reynosa, Tamaulipas, Mexico. It is currently used mostly for football matches. The stadium has a capacity of 15,000 people.
