= Omar Gómez (footballer, born 1980) =

Mexican footballer and manager (born 1980)

Personal information
- Full name: Omar Gerardo Gómez Galicia
- Date of birth: 1 June 1980 (age 46)
- Place of birth: Monterrey, Nuevo León, Mexico
- Height: 1.78 m (5 ft 10 in)
- Position: Forward

Youth career
- 1997–1998: Monterrey

Senior career*
Years	Team	Apps	(Gls)
1998–2009	Monterrey	95	(10)
2003–2004	→ Sinaloa (loan)	20	(2)
2006	→ UANL (loan)	1	(0)
2007–2008	→ Real Colima (loan)	36	(6)
2008–2009	→ Sinaloa (loan)	19	(0)
2009	→ Hermosillo (loan)	11	(0)

Managerial career
- 2013–2018: Monterrey Reserves and Academy
- 2018: Saltillo Soccer
- 2019: Juárez Reserves and Academy
- 2023–2025: Real Apodaca
- * Club domestic league appearances and goals as of 20:33 UTC, 23 September 2022

Omar Gerardo Gómez Galicia (born January 6, 1980) is a Mexican football manager and former player.
