= Luis López (footballer, born 1999) =

Mexican footballer

Personal information
- Full name: Luis Fernando López Payan
- Date of birth: 20 December 1999 (age 26)
- Place of birth: Culiacán, Sinaloa, Mexico
- Height: 1.81 m (5 ft 11 in)
- Position: Goalkeeper

Team information
- Current team: Los Cabos United
- Number: 1

Youth career
- Águilas UAS

Senior career*
Years	Team	Apps	(Gls)
2015–2023	Dorados	58	(0)
2023–2024	Los Cabos United	32	(0)
2024–2025	Halcones	26	(0)
2025–	Los Cabos United	7	(0)

International career
2018	Mexico U20	3	(0)
- * Club domestic league appearances and goals as of 12 April 2022

Luis Fernando López Payan (born 20 December 1999) is a Mexican professional footballer who plays as a goalkeeper for Primera Premier club Los Cabos United.

== Club career ==
López began his career with Águilas UAS, firstly in the youth system before making his first-team debut in the Tercera División de México in 2015. He soon joined Dorados de Sinaloa. In 2016, López was loaned to Tijuana Premier and subsequently made two appearances. He first appeared in the Dorados de Sinaloa's senior squad during the 2017–18 Ascenso MX season, being an unused substitute on four occasions in all competitions. On 10 January 2018, López made his professional debut in a Copa MX encounter with Correcaminos UAT. He made two further appearances in the 2017–18 Copa MX.

== International career ==
In October 2018, López was called up to the under-20 squad for the 2018 CONCACAF U-20 Championship in the United States. He featured in matches against Saint Martin, Grenada and Panama. Diego Ramírez selected López for the 2019 FIFA U-20 World Cup.

== Career statistics ==
As of 24 May 2019

Club statistics
Club	Season	League			Cup		Continental		Other		Total	
Club	Season	Division	Apps	Goals	Apps	Goals	Apps	Goals	Apps	Goals	Apps	Goals
Dorados	2015–16	Liga MX	0	0	0	0	—		0	0	0	0
Dorados	2016–17	Ascenso MX	0	0	0	0	—		0	0	0	0
Dorados	2017–18	Ascenso MX	0	0	3	0	—		0	0	3	0
Dorados	2018–19	Ascenso MX	3	0	4	0	—		0	0	7	0
Dorados	Total		3	0	7	0	—		0	0	10	0
Career total			3	0	7	0	—		0	0	10	0
