= Ricardo Rayas =

Mexican footballer and manager (born 1970)

Personal information
- Full name: Ricardo Rayas Sánchez
- Date of birth: 7 February 1970 (age 56)
- Place of birth: León, Mexico
- Height: 1.82 m (6 ft 0 in)
- Position: Defender

Team information
- Current team: Real Apodaca (manager)

Senior career*
Years	Team	Apps	(Gls)
1991–1995	León		
1997	Toros Neza		
1997–1998	Veracruz	7	(0)

Managerial career
- 2006–2007: Salamanca
- 2007–2008: Salamanca(assistant coach)
- 2008: Irapuato
- 2008: Irapuato (assistant coach)
- 2009: Unión de Curtidores
- 2009: Irapuato
- 2009–2011: Dorados de Sinaloa
- 2012: Irapuato
- 2012–2013: Unión de Curtidores
- 2013–2015: Alebrijes de Oaxaca
- 2016–2017: Mineros de Zacatecas
- 2017–2018: UAT
- 2018: Alebrijes de Oaxaca
- 2019: Tuxtla F.C.
- 2019: UdeG
- 2023–2024: Durango
- 2025–: Real Apodaca
- * Club domestic league appearances and goals

Ricardo Rayas Sánchez (born 7 February 1970) is a Mexican footballer and manager, and is the head coach of Real Apodaca in Liga Premier de México.
