= Diego Hernández (footballer, born 1998) =

Mexican footballer (born 1998)

Personal information
- Full name: Diego Antonio Hernández Aguayo
- Date of birth: 16 February 1998 (age 28)
- Place of birth: Guadalajara, Jalisco, Mexico
- Height: 1.85 m (6 ft 1 in)
- Position: Centre-back

Youth career
- 2013–2014: Vaqueros
- 2014: Leones Negros
- 2016–2017: Necaxa

Senior career*
Years	Team	Apps	(Gls)
2017–2019	Necaxa	5	(1)
2019–2022	Tecos	56	(2)
2022–2023	Durango	10	(0)
2023–2024	Racing Porto Palmeiras	21	(1)
2024	Tepatitlán	10	(0)
2025–2026	Racing de Veracruz	0	(0)
- * Club domestic league appearances and goals as of 26 July 2024

Diego Antonio Hernández Aguayo (born 16 February 1998) is a Mexican professional footballer.

== Honours ==
Necaxa

- Copa MX: Clausura 2018
