= Cimarrones de Sonora Premier =

- Full name: Cimarrones de Sonora Fútbol Club Premier
- Nicknames: Los Cimarrones (The Maroons); El Cornudo (The Cuckold); El Rebaño de la Montaña (The Herd of the Mountain)
- Founded: 14 July 2015; 10 years ago
- Ground: Estadio Héroe de Nacozari; Hermosillo, Sonora, Mexico
- Capacity: 18,747
- Owner: List: Félix Tonella, Edmundo Ruíz, Alejandro Camou, Servando Carbajal, Saúl Rojo
- Chairman: Juan Pablo Rojo
- Manager: Vacant
- League: Liga Premier - Serie A
- 2023–24: 7th, Group I (Reserve teams Champions)
Home colours	Away colours

The Cimarrones de Sonora Fútbol Club Premier play football in the Liga Premier in Hermosillo, Sonora, Mexico and are the official reserve team for Cimarrones de Sonora. The games are held in the city of Hermosillo in the Estadio Héroe de Nacozari.

== Players ==
=== Current squad ===
As of January 13, 2024.

Note: Flags indicate national team as defined under FIFA eligibility rules; some limited exceptions apply. Players may hold more than one non-FIFA nationality.

No. / Pos. / Nation / Player	No. / Pos. / Nation / Player
