= Los Cabos United =

Mexican association football club

- Full name: Los Cabos United
- Founded: 25 January 2022; 4 years ago
- Ground: Complejo Deportivo Don Koll
- Capacity: 3,500
- Owner: Grupo ISMX
- Chairman: Hugo Salcedo
- Manager: Edson Alvarado
- League: Liga Premier (Primera Premier)
- 2025–26: Regular phase: 8th of 14 (Group I); Final phase: Not qualified
Home colours	Away colours

Los Cabos United is a professional football club based in Los Cabos, Baja California Sur. The club competes in Liga Premier (Primera Premier), the third level of Mexican football, and plays its home matches at Complejo Deportivo Don Koll.

== History ==
The team was officially presented on 25 January 2022, and it was announced that it would become part of the Liga Premier since 2022–23 season, along with Rodrigo Ruiz being announced as the first manager of the club. In February 2022 the team was integrated in the Serie A de México.

Los Cabos United made its official debut on August 27, 2022, defeating Halcones de Zapopan 2–1. Víctor Argumedo scored the first two goals in the team's history. In the first official tournament, the team qualified for the promotion play-offs, however, they were eliminated in the quarterfinals by Chihuahua F.C.

In the 2023–24 season, Los Cabos United reached the final play–off series of Liga Premier – Serie A, however, they were defeated by Tampico Madero with an aggregate score of 1–4, so the Los Cabos team remained as runner-up in the league.

== Stadium ==
Los Cabos United plays their home matches at the Complejo Deportivo Don Koll in Cabo San Lucas, which has a capacity of 3,500 spectators.

== Players ==
=== First-team squad ===
As of 31 August 2026

Note: Flags indicate national team as defined under FIFA eligibility rules; some limited exceptions apply. Players may hold more than one non-FIFA nationality.

No.	Pos.	Nation	Player
1	GK	MEX	Luis López
2	DF	MEX	Sergio Guerrero
3	DF	MEX	Jacobo Rosas
4	DF	MEX	César Hernández
5	DF	MEX	Ángel Jiménez
6	MF	MEX	Édgar Ocampo
7	FW	MEX	Ignacio Rangel
8	MF	MEX	Juan Carlos Sandoval
9	FW	MEX	Antonio López
10	FW	MEX	Luis Gustavo Martínez
11	FW	MEX	Luis Carlos Martínez
13	GK	MEX	Víctor Pelagio
14	FW	MEX	Kevin Diéguez
15	DF	THA	Micah Duchowny

No.	Pos.	Nation	Player
16	MF	MEX	Renato González
17	DF	MEX	Víctor González
18	GK	MEX	Noé Godoy
19	MF	MEX	Juan Antonio Téllez
20	DF	MEX	Jesús Figueroa
21	MF	MEX	Emmanuel Quezada
22	MF	MEX	Abraham Ortega
25	MF	MEX	Jesús Nieto
26	MF	MEX	Luis Parra
27	FW	MEX	Carlos García
28	FW	MEX	Eduardo Chacón
30	MF	MEX	Jesús Torres
31	MF	MEX	Raúl López

== Managers ==
- (Chile) Rodrigo Ruiz (2022–2024)
- (Mexico) Alejandro Pérez (2024)
- (Mexico) Edson Alvarado (2024–)

== Honours ==
Domestic
Type	Competition	Titles	Seasons	Runners-up
Lower levels FMF	Liga Premier	0	—	2023–24
