= Real Apodaca F.C. =

Mexican association football club

- Full name: Real Apodaca Fútbol Club
- Nickname: Los Merengues (The Meringues)
- Founded: 13 June 2023; 3 years ago
- Ground: Unidad Deportiva Centenario del Ejército Mexicano; Apodaca, Nuevo León, Mexico
- Capacity: 2,000
- Owner: Jaime Rodríguez Ruíz
- Chairman: Júlio César Santos Correa
- Manager: Ricardo Rayas
- League: Liga Premier (Premier A)
- 2025–26: Liga Premier (Serie A); Regular phase: 1st (Group II); Final phase: Semifinals
Home colours	Away colours	Third colours

Real Apodaca Fútbol Club is a Mexican professional football team based in Apodaca, Nuevo León that plays in the Premier A, the intermediate branch of the Liga Premier de México, the third tier of Mexican football.

== History ==
In 2022, Real de Arteaga F.C. was founded in Querétaro City, this team played in the Liga Premier – Serie A during 2022–23 season, however, it failed to attract enough interest from the public and also had poor sporting results, so its owners decided to put it up for sale. On June 13, 2023, the purchase of Real de Arteaga was announced by businessmen and footballers like Héctor Mancilla and Julio César, who are based in the Monterrey area, finally the new owners moved the team to that region and renamed it Real Apodaca F.C.

On June 30, 2023, the team was accepted into the Liga Premier - Serie A, being placed in Group 1.

In February 2025, the club was involved in a match-fixing scandal involving betting, which resulted in the suspension of six Real Apodaca players for several years, although the team was able to continue participating normally.

== Players ==
=== First-team squad ===
As of 7 September 2026

Note: Flags indicate national team as defined under FIFA eligibility rules; some limited exceptions apply. Players may hold more than one non-FIFA nationality.

No.	Pos.	Nation	Player
1	GK	MEX	Axel Escandón
2	DF	MEX	Ramón Cano
3	DF	MEX	Edson Jaramillo
4	DF	MEX	Brandon Fernández
5	MF	MEX	Ismael Soloache
6	DF	MEX	Edson Martínez
7	MF	MEX	Sergio Treviño
8	DF	MEX	Kevin Mariscal
9	FW	MEX	Diego Uriarte
10	MF	MEX	Erick Pérez
11	MF	MEX	Daniel Jiménez
12	FW	MEX	Sebastían Cárdenas
13	DF	COL	Daniel Rojas

No.	Pos.	Nation	Player
15	MF	MEX	Alejandro Ponce
16	FW	MEX	Andry Casillas
18	GK	MEX	Manuel Fimbres
19	FW	MEX	Jesús Quiroz
20	MF	MEX	Francisco Quiñones
21	DF	MEX	Anwar Ibarra
22	MF	MEX	Axel García
23	MF	MEX	Víctor Hugo García
24	DF	MEX	Octavio Castañeda
25	DF	MEX	Antonio Hernández
28	DF	MEX	Oscar Esquivel
30	GK	MEX	Diego Moreno
33	DF	MEX	Brandon Díaz

== Managers ==
- (Chile) Héctor Mancilla (13 June 2023 – 4 September 2023)
- (Mexico) Omar Gómez (1 October 2023 – 29 May 2025)
- (Mexico) Ricardo Rayas (24 June 2025 – present)

== Reserves ==
=== Real Apodaca TDP ===
Reserve team that plays in the Liga TDP, the fourth level of Mexican football.
