= Leones Negros UdeG Premier =

- Full name: Club Leones Negros de la Universidad de Guadalajara Premier
- Nicknames: Los Leones Negros (The Black Lions); Los Melenudos (The Hairy Ones); Los Universitarios (The College Ones)
- Founded: 25 August 2013; 12 years ago
- Ground: Instalaciones Club Deportivo U.de G. Zapopan, Jalisco, Mexico
- Capacity: 3,000
- Owner: UdeG
- Chairman: José Alberto Castellanos Gutiérrez
- Manager: Jairo González
- League: Liga Premier (Serie A)
- 2025–26: Regular phase: 4th (Group I); Final phase: Semi–finals (Reserves teams)
- Website: http://www.leonesnegros.udg.mx/
Home colours	Away colours

Club Leones Negros de la Universidad de Guadalajara Premier play in the Liga Premier in Zapopan, Mexico and are the official reserve team for Leones Negros UdeG.

== Players ==
=== Current squad ===
As of January 11, 2026

Note: Flags indicate national team as defined under FIFA eligibility rules; some limited exceptions apply. Players may hold more than one non-FIFA nationality.

No.	Pos.	Nation	Player
81	MF	MEX	Kevin Madrigal
82	DF	MEX	Ulises Meza
83	DF	MEX	Jared Escalante
85	MF	MEX	Arturo Hernández
86	MF	MEX	Daniel Torres
87	MF	MEX	Mauro Valenzuela
88	DF	MEX	Olaf González
89	DF	MEX	Ángel Moyeda
90	FW	MEX	Jeremy Sepúlveda
91	MF	MEX	Eddison Navarro
92	DF	MEX	Braulio Jiménez
93	DF	MEX	Miguel Nuño

No.	Pos.	Nation	Player
94	DF	MEX	Francisco Padilla
95	DF	MEX	Joshua Ortega
96	MF	MEX	Ángel Jiménez
97	MF	MEX	André Quezada
98	GK	MEX	Sebastián Martín
99	GK	MEX	Jorge Orozco
100	FW	MEX	Farid Morales
101	MF	MEX	Joseph Silva
102	MF	MEX	Víctor Andrade
104	MF	MEX	Johan Zavaleta
105	MF	MEX	Dayton Chávez
106	DF	MEX	Carlos Salcido
