= 2016–17 Liga de Nuevos Talentos season =

Liga de Nuevos Talentos
- Season: 2016-17
- Dates: 12 August 2016 – 13 May 2017
- Champions: Apertura: Correcaminos "B"; Clausura; Yalmakán
- Promoted: Jiquipilas Verde Valle F.C.
- Relegated: Alacranes Rojos
- Top goalscorer: Apertura: Armando Arce (11 goals); Clausura; José Coronel (16 goals)
- Biggest home win: Apertura: Dorados "B" 12–1 Alacranes Rojos (1 October 2016); Clausura; Dorados "B" 10–0 Alacranes Rojos (25 February 2017)
- Biggest away win: Apertura: Alacranes Rojos 0–8 Correcaminos "B" (11 September 2016); Clausura; Alacranes Rojos 0–12 Dorados "B" (8 January 2017)
- Highest scoring: Apertura: Celaya "B" (29 points); Clausura; Yalmakán (33 points)
- Stats are from the regular season only

The 2016–17 Liga de Nuevos Talentos season was split in two tournaments Apertura and Clausura. Liga de Nuevos Talentos was the fourth–tier football league of Mexico. The season was played between 12 August 2016 and 14 May 2017.

== Torneo Apertura ==
=== Changes from the previous season ===
21 teams participated in this tournament.

- Atlético San Luis "B", Tecomán F.C., Selva Cañera and Académicos de Atlas disappeared from the League.
- Tigrillos de Chetumal eliminated his main team.
- Yalmakán F.C., Cuatetes de Acapulco F.C., Atlético Lagunero and Dorados "B" new expansion teams for the league.
- C.D. Uruapan could not dispute this competition and lent his franchise to Titanes de Saltillo.
- Sporting Canamy was promoted to the Liga Premier de Ascenso as an expansion team.
- Zorros de la UMSNH changed its name to Alacranes Rojos de Apatzingán.
- Jiquipilas Valle Verde F.C. was promoted after being runner-up in the Tercera División.

=== Stadiums and locations ===
==== Group 1 ====
Location of teams in the 2016–17 LNT Group 1

Club	City	Stadium	Capacity
Alacranes Rojos de Apatzingán	Apatzingán, Michoacán	Unidad Deportiva Adolfo López Mateos	4,000
Atlético Lagunero	Matamoros, Coahuila	Unidad Deportiva Raúl Onofre	1,000
Calor	Gómez Palacio, Durango	Unidad Deportiva Francisco Gómez Palacio	4,000
Correcaminos "B"	Ciudad Victoria, Tamaulipas	Eugenio Alvizo Porras	5,000
Deportivo San Juan	San Juan de los Lagos, Jalisco	Antonio R. Márquez	1,000
Dorados "B"	Culiacán, Sinaloa	Banorte	20,108
Sahuayo F.C.	Sahuayo, Michoacán	Unidad Deportiva Municipal	1,500

==== Group 2 ====
Location of teams in the 2016–17 LNT Group 2

Club	City	Stadium	Capacity
Celaya "B"	Celaya, Guanajuato	Miguel Alemán Valdés	23,182
Colibríes de Malinalco	Malinalco, State of Mexico	La Loma	3,500
Cuatetes de Acapulco	Acapulco, Guerrero	Unidad Deportiva Acapulco	13,000
Deportivo Gladiadores	Cuautitlán, State of Mexico	Los Pinos	5,000
FC Satélites	Tulancingo, Hidalgo	Primero de Mayo	2,500
Garzas UAEH	Pachuca, Hidalgo	Revolución Mexicana	3,500
Vikingos de Chalco	Chalco, State of Mexico	Arreola	2,500

==== Group 3 ====
Location of teams in the 2016–17 LNT Group 3

Club	City	Stadium	Capacity
Coyotes	Chiautempan, Tlaxcala	Unidad Deportiva Próspero Cahuantzi	2,500
Cuautla	Cuautla, Morelos	Isidro Gil Tapia	5,000
Deportivo Chimalhuacán	Chimalhuacán, State of Mexico	Tepalcates	5,000
Jiquipilas Valle Verde F.C.	Jiquipilas, Chiapas	Richard Ruíz	3,000
Lobos Prepa	Puebla City, Puebla	Universitario BUAP	19,283
Patriotas de Córdoba	Córdoba, Veracruz	UVM Campus Villa Rica	2,000
Yalmakán F.C.	Puerto Morelos, Quintana Roo	Unidad Deportiva Colonia Pescadores	1,200

=== Regular season ===
==== Group 1 ====
===== Standings =====
Pos	Team	Pld	W	D	L	GF	GA	GD	Pts	Qualification
1	Correcaminos "B"	12	8	2	2	41	12	+29	27	Advance to Liguilla
2	Sahuayo	12	8	1	3	26	14	+12	27	Advance to Liguilla
3	Calor	12	8	1	3	27	15	+12	26	Advance to Liguilla
4	Dorados "B"	12	8	0	4	32	14	+18	24	
5	Atlético Lagunero	12	4	1	7	18	21	−3	14	
6	Alacranes Rojos	12	2	0	10	14	60	−46	7	
7	Deportivo San Juan	12	1	1	10	12	34	−22	5	

Updated to match(es) played on November 12, 2016. Source: SoccerWay

===== Results =====
Home \ Away	ARJ	ATL	CLR	CUT	DSJ	DOR	SHY
Alacranes Rojos		0–5	2–4	0–8	1–3	0–2	2–4
Atlético Lagunero	0–3		3–1	1–2	4–1	2–1	1–2
Calor	5–0	2–1		0–0	1–0	2–0	2–1
Correcaminos	10–0	4–0	3–2		6–0	4–0	0–3
Deportivo San Juan	2–3	1–1	0–3	2–3		2–3	0–2
Dorados	12–1	1–0	3–2	3–0	5–0		2–0
Sahuayo	5–2	3–0	2–3	1–1	2–1	1–0	

Updated to match(es) played on 12 November 2016. Source: SoccerWay
Legend: Blue = home team win; Yellow = draw; Red = away team win.

==== Group 2 ====
===== Standings =====
Pos	Team	Pld	W	D	L	GF	GA	GD	Pts	Qualification
1	Celaya "B"	12	8	3	1	26	10	+16	29	Advance to Liguilla
2	Colibríes de Malinalco	12	7	2	3	26	16	+10	26	Advance to Liguilla
3	Gladiadores	12	6	3	3	18	15	+3	22	Advance to Liguilla
4	Cuatetes de Acapulco	12	5	2	5	23	18	+5	18	
5	FC Satélites	12	5	1	6	21	18	+3	17	
6	Garzas UAEH	12	4	3	5	18	16	+2	16	
7	Vikingos de Chalco	12	0	0	12	5	44	−39	0	

Updated to match(es) played on November 13, 2016. Source: SoccerWay

===== Results =====
Home \ Away	CEL	CMA	CUA	DGL	SAT	UEH	VIK
Celaya		2–2	1–1	3–0	5–3	1–2	4–0
Colibríes	0–2		3–1	2–0	2–1	2–2	4–1
Cuatetes	0–1	2–3		1–1	1–0	4–2	5–0
Dep. Gladiadores	1–1	2–1	2–0		1–2	1–0	3–2
FC Satélites	0–1	2–1	4–2	2–3		0–1	4–0
Garzas UAEH	0–3	1–2	1–2	0–0	1–1		4–0
Vikingos	1–2	0–4	0–4	1–4	0–2	0–4	

Updated to match(es) played on 13 November 2016. Source: SoccerWay
Legend: Blue = home team win; Yellow = draw; Red = away team win.

==== Group 3 ====
===== Standings =====
Pos	Team	Pld	W	D	L	GF	GA	GD	Pts	Qualification
1	Lobos Prepa	12	6	5	1	28	14	+14	24	Advance to Liguilla
2	Jiquipilas Valle Verde	12	7	1	4	21	19	+2	24	Advance to Liguilla
3	Cuautla	12	4	6	2	21	13	+8	20	
4	Yalmakán	12	5	4	3	20	12	+8	20	
5	Patriotas de Córdoba	12	6	1	5	14	17	−3	19	
6	Coyotes	12	3	1	8	9	20	−11	11	
7	Deportivo Chimalhuacán	12	1	2	9	6	24	−18	5	

Updated to match(es) played on November 13, 2016. Source: SoccerWay

===== Results =====
Home \ Away	COY	CUA	DCH	JVV	LOB	PCB	YAL
Coyotes		0–2	2–0	1–2	1–2	0–1	1–4
Cuautla	0–0		2–0	2–1	1–1	5–0	1–1
Dep. Chimalhuacán	0–1	2–2		0–2	0–3	1–2	1–0
Jiquipilas Valle Verde	3–1	4–3	1–0		3–3	1–0	2–1
Lobos Prepa	3–0	1–1	7–1	2–1		1–2	3–2
Patriotas	0–2	2–1	2–1	3–0	1–1		0–1
Yalmakán	3–0	1–1	0–0	3–1	1–1	3–1	

Updated to match(es) played on 12 November 2016. Source: SoccerWay
Legend: Blue = home team win; Yellow = draw; Red = away team win.

=== Regular-season statistics ===
==== Top goalscorers ====
Players sorted first by goals scored, then by last name.

Rank	Player	Club	Goals
1	(Mexico) Armando Arce	Correcaminos "B"	11
2	(Mexico) José Coronel	Dorados "B"	10
2	(Mexico) Jesús Álvarez	Lobos Prepa	10
2	(Mexico) Edgar Zamudio	Lobos Prepa	10
5	(Mexico) Adrián Muro	Colibríes de Malinalco	9
5	(Mexico) Sergio Lizárraga	Sahuayo F.C.	9
5	(Mexico) Pavel Marín	Cuatetes de Acapulco	9

Source: Liga Premier

=== Liguilla ===
==== Liguilla ====
The four best teams of each group play two games against each other on a home-and-away basis. The higher seeded teams play on their home field during the second leg. The winner of each match up is determined by aggregate score. In the quarterfinals and semifinals, if the two teams are tied on aggregate the higher seeded team advances. In the final, if the two teams are tied after both legs, the match goes to extra time and, if necessary, a penalty shoot-out.

Quarter-finals
2	Correcaminos "B"	1	2	3
8	Verde Valle	2	0	2
4	Calor	3	1	4
5	Colibríes	3	2	5
1	Celaya "B"	1	2	3
8	Deportivo Gladiadores	2	0	2
3	Sahuayo	1	2	3
6	Lobos Prepa (a)	1	2	3

Semi-finals
2	Correcaminos "B"	1	5	6
5	Colibríes	3	1	4
1	Celaya "B"	1	2	3
6	Lobos Prepa (a)	1	2	3

Final
2	Correcaminos "B" (pen.)	1	2	3 (4)
6	Lobos Prepa	1	2	3 (3)

==== Quarter-finals ====
The first legs was played on 16 and 17 November, and the second legs was played on 19 and 20 November 2016.

Team 1	Agg.	Team 2	1st leg	2nd leg
Correcaminos "B"	3–2	Verde Valle	1–2	2–0
Calor	4–5	Colibríes	3–3	1–2
Celaya "B"	3–2	Deportivo Gladiadores	1–2	2–0
Sahuayo	3–3	Lobos Prepa (a)	1–1	2–2

===== First leg =====
16 November 2016	Lobos Prepa	1–1	Sahuayo	Puebla City, Puebla
10:00	Zamudio 46'	Report	Mosqueda 15'	Stadium: Estadio Universitario BUAP; Attendance: 200

16 November 2016	Colibríes	3–3	Calor	Malinalco, State of Mexico
15:00	López 18'; Lara 29'; Quintana 63'	Report	Salazar 3'; Silva 46'; Espinoza 89'	Stadium: Estadio La Loma; Attendance: 150

17 November 2016	Jiquipilas Valle Verde	2–1	Correcaminos "B"	Jiquipilas, Chiapas
15:00	Villafaña 22'; Ruíz 82'	Report	Paz 58'	Stadium: Estadio Richard Ruíz; Attendance: 2,500

17 November 2016	Deportivo Gladiadores	2–1	Celaya "B"	Cuautitlán, State of Mexico
16:00	Ramírez 3', 88'	Report	García 56'	Stadium: Estadio Los Pinos; Attendance: 300

===== Second leg =====
19 November 2016	Calor	1–2 (4–5 agg.)	Colibríes	Gómez Palacio, Durango
15:00	Salazar 78'	Report	Muro 29'; Quintana 51'	Stadium: Unidad Deportiva Gómez Palacio; Attendance: 100

19 November 2016	Sahuayo	2–2 (3–3 agg.)	Lobos Prepa	Sahuayo, Michoacán
16:00	López 32'; Chávez 90+2'	Report	Bastida 7'; García 78'	Stadium: Unidad Deportiva Municipal; Attendance: 1,500

20 November 2016	Celaya "B"	2–0 (3–2 agg.)	Deportivo Gladiadores	Celaya, Guanajuato
12:00	Hernández 46'; Rosales 88'	Report		Stadium: Estadio Miguel Alemán Valdés; Attendance: 100

20 November 2016	Correcaminos "B"	2–0 (3–2 agg.)	Jiquipilas Valle Verde	Ciudad Victoria, Tamaulipas
18:00	Paz 19'; Hernández 39'	Report		Stadium: Estadio Marte R. Gómez; Attendance: 500

==== Semi-finals ====
The first legs was played on 24 November, and the second legs was played on 27 November 2016.

Team 1	Agg.	Team 2	1st leg	2nd leg
Correcaminos "B"	6–4	Colibríes	1–3	5–1
Celaya "B"	3–3	Lobos Premier (a)	1–1	2–2

===== First leg =====
24 November 2016	Lobos Prepa	1–1	Celaya "B"	Puebla City, Puebla
10:00	Madrid 56' (o.g.)	Report	González 3'	Stadium: Estadio Universitario BUAP; Attendance: 800

24 November 2016	Colibríes	3–1	Correcaminos "B"	Malinalco, State of Mexico
15:00	Quintana 9'; Muro 55'; Velázquez 64'	Report	Tinajero 22'	Stadium: Estadio La Loma; Attendance: 500

===== Second leg =====
27 November 2016	Celaya "B"	2–2 (3–3 agg.)	Lobos Prepa	Celaya, Guanajuato
12:00	González 36'; Vázquez 75'	Report	Fierro 2'; Álvarez 47'	Stadium: Estadio Miguel Alemán Valdés; Attendance: 500

27 November 2016	Correcaminos "B"	5–1 (6–4 agg.)	Colibríes	Ciudad Victoria, Tamaulipas
18:00	Arce 41', 54'; Tinajero 42', 86'; Juárez 72'	Report	Muro 84'	Stadium: Estadio Marte R. Gómez; Attendance: 4,000

==== Final ====
The first leg was played on 1 December, and the second leg was played on 4 December 2016.

Team 1	Agg.	Team 2	1st leg	2nd leg
Correcaminos "B" (pen.)	3–3	Lobos Prepa	1–1	2–2

===== First leg =====
1 December 2016	Lobos Prepa	1–1	Correcaminos "B"	Puebla City, Puebla
18:00	Álvarez 45'	Report	Hernández 90'	Stadium: Estadio Universitario BUAP; Attendance: 1,000; Referee: (Mexico) Edgar Espadas

===== Second leg =====
4 December 2016	Correcaminos "B"	2–2 (3–3 agg.) (4–3 p)	Lobos Prepa	Ciudad Victoria, Tamaulipas
18:00	Rincón 77'; Arce 95'	Report	Álvarez 57'; Esquerro 104'	Stadium: Estadio Marte R. Gómez; Attendance: 2,600; Referee: (Mexico) Antonio Olalde

Apertura 2016 winners:
Correcaminos "B"
3rd Title

== Torneo Clausura ==
=== Regular season ===
==== Group 1 ====
===== Standings =====
Pos	Team	Pld	W	D	L	GF	GA	GD	Pts	Qualification or relegation
1	Dorados "B"	12	7	5	0	45	28	+17	30	Advance to Liguilla
2	Calor	12	8	3	1	27	10	+17	28	Advance to Liguilla
3	Correcaminos "B"	12	7	1	4	34	13	+21	24	Advance to Liguilla
4	Sahuayo	12	4	4	4	19	14	+5	17	
5	Deportivo San Juan	12	3	4	5	22	23	−1	14	
6	Atlético Lagunero	12	3	3	6	27	36	−9	14	
7	Alacranes Rojos	12	0	0	12	6	76	−70	0	Relegated to Tercera División

Updated to match(es) played on April 8, 2017. Source: SoccerWay

===== Results =====
Home \ Away	ARJ	ATL	CLR	CUT	DSJ	DOR	SHY
Alacranes Rojos		2–6	2–3	0–7	0–3	0–12	1–4
Atlético Lagunero	7–1		0–3	3–2	4–4	2–4	1–1
Calor	4–0	2–0		2–3	4–1	1–1	5–2
Correcaminos	7–0	5–1	0–1		4–0	0–1	1–0
Deportivo San Juan	6–0	1–1	1–2	2–4		2–2	1–0
Dorados	10–0	9–1	0–0	3–1	0–0		0–0
Sahuayo	7–0	3–0	0–0	0–0	2–1	1–3	

Updated to match(es) played on 8 April 2017. Source: SoccerWay
Legend: Blue = home team win; Yellow = draw; Red = away team win.

==== Group 2 ====
===== Standings =====
Pos	Team	Pld	W	D	L	GF	GA	GD	Pts	Qualification
1	Garzas UAEH	12	6	4	2	21	17	+4	23	Advance to Liguilla
2	Celaya "B"	12	6	2	4	29	17	+12	22	Advance to Liguilla
3	Colibríes	12	5	5	2	25	15	+10	21	
4	Cuatetes de Acapulco	12	5	2	5	19	21	−2	18	
5	Gladiadores	12	5	3	4	11	15	−4	18	
6	FC Satélites	12	2	5	5	17	25	−8	11	
7	Vikingos de Chalco	12	1	3	8	10	22	−12	7	

Updated to match(es) played on April 9, 2017. Source: SoccerWay

===== Results =====
Home \ Away	CEL	CMA	CUA	DGL	SAT	UEH	VIK
Celaya		2–3	1–2	3–0	2–3	4–1	3–0
Colibríes	1–1		5–2	4–0	1–1	1–2	1–0
Cuatetes	1–4	0–0		2–0	1–2	1–1	3–0
Dep. Gladiadores	1–2	1–1	2–0		1–0	0–0	3–2
FC Satélites	0–4	3–3	1–4	1–2		2–3	1–1
Garzas UAEH	4–2	0–3	5–2	0–0	1–1		1–0
Vikingos	1–1	3–2	0–1	0–1	2–2	1–3	

Updated to match(es) played on 9 April 2017. Source: SoccerWay
Legend: Blue = home team win; Yellow = draw; Red = away team win.

==== Group 3 ====
===== Standings =====
Pos	Team	Pld	W	D	L	GF	GA	GD	Pts	Qualification
1	Yalmakán	12	10	2	0	21	13	+8	33	Advance to Liguilla
2	Cuautla	12	7	2	3	17	8	+9	24	Advance to Liguilla
3	Lobos Prepa	12	5	4	3	23	11	+12	22	Advance to Liguilla
4	Patriotas de Córdoba	12	4	5	3	10	12	−2	17	
5	Jiquipilas Valle Verde	12	3	4	5	15	21	−6	13	
6	Coyotes	12	2	3	7	10	20	−10	10	
7	Deportivo Chimalhuacán	12	0	2	10	8	29	−21	2	

Updated to match(es) played on April 9, 2017. Source: SoccerWay

===== Results =====
Home \ Away	COY	CUA	DCH	JVV	LOB	PCB	YAL
Coyotes		1–0	1–1	0–1	0–1	0–0	0–3
Cuautla	4–1		3–1	2–0	1–1	0–0	0–1
Dep. Chimalhuacán	0–2	1–2		0–0	0–4	1–2	0–1
Jiquipilas Valle Verde	2–1	1–3	6–3		2–2	1–1	1–1
Lobos Prepa	2–2	0–1	5–0	3–0		3–0	0–1
Patriotas	3–2	0–1	2–1	1–0	1–1		0–0
Yalmakán	3–0	1–0	1–0	4–1	3–1	2–0	

Updated to match(es) played on 9 April 2017. Source: SoccerWay
Legend: Blue = home team win; Yellow = draw; Red = away team win.

=== Regular-season statistics ===
==== Top goalscorers ====
Players sorted first by goals scored, then by last name.

Rank	Player	Club	Goals
1	(Mexico) José Coronel	Dorados "B"	16
2	(Mexico) Edgar Quintana	Colibríes de Malinalco	14
3	(Mexico) Enrique Arca	Correcaminos "B"	12
4	(Mexico) Omar González	Celaya "B"	10
4	(Mexico) Luis Hernández	Garzas UAEH	10
6	(Mexico) Raymundo Mejía	FC Satélites	9
6	(Mexico) Alexis López	Dorados "B"	9

Source: Liga Premier

=== Liguilla ===
==== Liguilla ====
The four best teams of each group play two games against each other on a home-and-away basis. The higher seeded teams play on their home field during the second leg. The winner of each match up is determined by aggregate score. In the quarterfinals and semifinals, if the two teams are tied on aggregate the higher seeded team advances. In the final, if the two teams are tied after both legs, the match goes to extra time and, if necessary, a penalty shoot-out.

Quarter-finals
1	Yalmakán	0	3	3
8	Lobos Prepa	1	0	1
2	Dorados "B"	1	4	5
7	Celaya "B" (a)	2	3	5
3	Calor	0	4	4
6	Garzas UAEH	0	2	2
4	Correcaminos "B"	0	2	2
5	Cuautla	2	1	3

Semi-finals
1	Yalmakán	0	2	2
7	Celaya "B"	0	1	1
3	Calor (*)	1	1	2
5	Cuautla	1	1	2

Final
1	Yalmakán	0	1	1
3	Calor	0	0	0

(*) Calor was classified by its position in the season table

==== Quarter-finals ====
The first legs was played on 15 and 16 April, and the second legs was played on 22 and 23 April 2017.

Team 1	Agg.	Team 2	1st leg	2nd leg
Yalmakán	3–1	Lobos Prepa	0–1	3–0
Dorados "B"	5–5	Celaya "B" (a)	1–2	4–3
Calor	4–2	Garzas UAEH	0–0	4–2
Correcaminos "B"	2–3	Cuautla	0–2	2–1

===== First leg =====
15 April 2017	Cuautla	2–0	Correcaminos "B"	Cuautla, Morelos
16:00	González 62'; Pérez 68'	Report		Stadium: Estadio Isidro Gil Tapia; Attendance: 2,500; Referee: (Mexico) Arturo Alcántara

16 April 2017	Lobos Prepa	1–0	Yalmakán	Puebla City, Puebla
11:00	Zamudio 81'	Report		Stadium: Estadio Universitario BUAP; Attendance: 700; Referee: (Mexico) Miguel Ángel Moreno

16 April 2017	Celaya "B"	2–1	Dorados "B"	Celaya, Guanajuato
12:00	González 13', 82'	Report	Coronel 78'	Stadium: Estadio Miguel Alemán Valdés; Attendance: 1,000; Referee: (Mexico) Edgardo Espejo

16 April 2017	Garzas UAEH	0–0	Calor	Pachuca, Hidalgo
16:00		Report		Stadium: Estadio Revolución Mexicana; Attendance: 500; Referee: (Mexico) Martín Navarro

===== Second leg =====
22 April 2017	Dorados "B"	4–3 (5–5 agg.)	Celaya "B"	Culiacán, Sinaloa
10:00	Mendivil 33'; Sánchez 76'; Salazar 88'; Coronel 89'	Report	Vázquez 18'; González 64'; Dueñas 85'	Stadium: Cancha 3 Sagarpa; Attendance: 100; Referee: (Mexico) Miguel Ángel González

22 April 2017	Calor	4–2 (4–2 agg.)	Garzas UAEH	Gómez Palacio, Durango
16:00	Rosas 7', 54'; García 17'; Salazar 65'	Report	Hernández 58'; Urbano 60'	Stadium: Unidad Deportiva Gómez Palacio; Attendance: 120; Referee: (Mexico) Eduardo Vázquez

22 April 2017	Correcaminos "B"	2–1 (2–3 agg.)	Cuautla	Ciudad Victoria, Tamaulipas
19:00	Juárez 78', 82'	Report	González 87'	Stadium: Estadio Marte R. Gómez; Attendance: 250; Referee: (Mexico) Luis Martínez

23 April 2017	Yalmakán	3–0 (3–1 agg.)	Lobos Prepa	Puerto Morelos, Quintana Roo
16:00	Guzmán 19', 81'; Estrella 80'	Report		Stadium: Unidad Deportiva Pescadores; Attendance: 2,000; Referee: (Mexico) Edgar Arenas

==== Semi-finals ====
The first legs was played on 27 April, and the second legs was played on 30 April 2017.

Team 1	Agg.	Team 2	1st leg	2nd leg
Yalmakán	2–1	Celaya "B"	0–0	2–1
Calor	2–2	Cuautla	1–1	1–1

===== First leg =====
27 April 2017	Cuautla	1–1	Calor	Cuautla, Morelos
16:30	González 53'	Report	García 59'	Stadium: Estadio Isidro Gil Tapia; Attendance: 4,000; Referee: (Mexico) Edgar Espadas

27 April 2017	Celaya "B"	0–0	Yalmakán	Celaya, Guanajuato
17:00		Report		Stadium: Estadio Miguel Alemán Valdés; Attendance: 1,500; Referee: (Mexico) Víctor Cáceres

===== Second leg =====
30 April 2017	Yalmakán	2–1 (2–1 agg.)	Celaya "B"	Puerto Morelos, Quintana Roo
16:00	Guzmán 21'; Navarro 84'	Report	González 76'	Stadium: Unidad Deportiva Pescadores; Attendance: 600; Referee: (Mexico) Rodolfo Villanueva

30 April 2017	Calor	1–1 (2–2 agg.)	Cuautla	Gómez Palacio, Durango
17:00	Salazar 68'	Report	Palma 90+1'	Stadium: Unidad Deportiva Gómez Palacio; Attendance: 300; Referee: (Mexico) Sergio Ruvalcaba

==== Final ====
The first leg was played on 4 May, and the second leg was played on 7 May 2017.

Team 1	Agg.	Team 2	1st leg	2nd leg
Yalmakán	1–0	Calor	0–0	1–0

===== First leg =====
4 May 2017	Calor	0–0	Yalmakán	Gómez Palacio, Durango
17:00		Report		Stadium: Unidad Deportiva Gómez Palacio; Attendance: 850; Referee: (Mexico) Sergio Ruvalcaba

===== Second leg =====
7 May 2017	Yalmakán	1–0 (1–0 agg.)	Calor	Puerto Morelos, Quintana Roo
16:00	Guzmán 90+3'	Report		Stadium: Unidad Deportiva Pescadores; Attendance: 1,200; Referee: (Mexico) Gilberto Alvarado

Clausura 2017 winners:
Yalmakán F.C.
1st Title

== Relegation Table ==
P	Team	Pts	G	Pts/G
1	Dorados "B"	55	24	2.2917
2	Calor	54	24	2.2500
3	Yalmakán	53	24	2.2083
4	Correcaminos "B"	51	24	2.1250
5	Celaya "B"	51	24	2.1250
6	Colibríes	47	24	1.9583
7	Lobos Prepa	46	24	1.9167
8	Cuautla	44	24	1.8333
9	Sahuayo	44	24	1.8333
10	Deportivo Gladiadores	40	24	1.6667
11	Garzas UAEH	39	24	1.6250
12	Jiquipilas Valle Verde	37	24	1.5417
13	Patriotas de Córdoba	36	24	1.5000
14	Cuatetes de Acapulco	36	24	1.5000
15	FC Satélites	28	24	1.1667
16	Atlético Lagunero	28	24	1.1667
17	Coyotes	21	24	0.8750
18	Deportivo San Juan	19	24	0.7917
19	Deportivo Chimalhuacán	7	24	0.2917
20	Vikingos de Chalco	7	24	0.2917
21	Alacranes Rojos	7	24	0.2917

Last updated: 9 April 2017
Source:Segunda División
P = Position; G = Games played; Pts = Points; Pts/G = Ratio of points to games played

== Promotion Final ==
The Promotion Final is a series of matches played by the champions of the tournaments Apertura and Clausura, the game is played to determine the winning team of the promotion to Liga Premier de Ascenso. The first leg was played on 11 May 2017, and the second leg was played on 14 May 2017.

Team 1	Agg.	Team 2	1st leg	2nd leg
Yalmakán'	2–1	Correcaminos "B"	0–1	2–0

=== First leg ===
11 May 2017	Correcaminos "B"	1–0	Yalmakán	Ciudad Victoria, Tamaulipas
17:00	Arce 35'	Report		Stadium: Estadio Marte R. Gómez; Attendance: 1,000; Referee: (Mexico) Eduardo Vázquez

=== Second leg ===
14 May 2017	Yalmakán	2–0 (2–1 agg.)	Correcaminos "B"	Puerto Morelos, Quintana Roo
16:00	López 52'; Carrillo 59'	Report		Stadium: Unidad Deportiva Pescadores; Attendance: 1,200; Referee: (Mexico) Michel Caballero

2016–17 Liga de Nuevos Talentos winners

1st title

== See also ==
- 2016–17 Liga MX season
- 2016–17 Ascenso MX season
- 2016–17 Liga Premier de Ascenso season
