= 2016–17 Liga Premier de Ascenso season =

Liga Premier de Ascenso
- Season: 2016-17
- Dates: 12 August 2016 – 13 May 2017
- Champions: Apertura: Tlaxcala; Clausura; Tlaxcala
- Promoted: Real Zamora; UdeG "B"
- Relegated: FC Politécnico; Titanes de Saltillo
- Top goalscorer: Apertura: Lizandro Echeverría (14 goals); Clausura; Joaquín Hernández (15 goals)
- Biggest home win: Apertura: UdeG "B" 6–0 Titanes (11 September 2016); Clausura; Athletic Morelos 9–3 Politécnico (15 January 2017)
- Biggest away win: Apertura: Titanes 0–4 Monterrey Premier (20 November 2016); Clausura; Santos Soledad 2–6 Morelia Premier (19 March 2017)
- Highest scoring: Apertura: Pioneros (44 points); Clausura; Guadalajara Premier (35 points)
- Stats are from the regular season only

The 2016–17 Liga Premier de Ascenso season was split in two tournaments Apertura and Clausura. Liga Premier was the third-tier football league of Mexico. The season was played between 12 August 2016 and 13 May 2017.

== Torneo Apertura ==
=== Changes from the previous season ===
48 teams participated in this tournament.

- Atlético Veracruz moved to Ensenada and became Cuervos de Ensenada.
- Dorados Premier leaves the category and entered Necaxa Premier instead.
- Mineros de Fresnillo played the league after a season of extension to improve its sports facilities.
- C.D. Uruapan could not dispute this competition and lent its franchise to Titanes de Saltillo.
- Reboceros de La Piedad, Sporting Canamy and FC Politécnico were accepted in the tournament as expansion teams.
- Real Zamora was promoted from the Liga de Nuevos Talentos.
- UdeG "B" was promoted from Tercera División.

=== Stadiums and locations ===
==== Group 1 ====
Location of teams in the 2016–17 LPA Group 1

Club	City	Stadium	Capacity
Alacranes de Durango	Durango City, Durango	Francisco Zarco	18,000
Atlas Premier	Zapopan, Jalisco	Alfredo "Pistache" Torres	3,000
Cimarrones "B"	Guaymas, Sonora	Unidad Deportiva Julio Alfonso	3,000
Cuervos de Ensenada	Ensenada, Baja California	Municipal de Ensenada	7,600
Dorados Fuerza UACH	Chihuahua City, Chihuahua	Olímpico Universitario José Reyes Baeza	22,000
Guadalajara Premier	Zapopan, Jalisco	Verde Valle	800
Mineros de Fresnillo	Fresnillo, Zacatecas	Unidad Deportiva Minera Fresnillo	6,000
Monterrey Premier	Santiago, Nuevo León	El Barrial	570
Murciélagos "B"	Guamúchil, Sinaloa	Coloso del Dique	5,000
Reynosa	Reynosa, Tamaulipas	Unidad Deportiva Solidaridad	20,000
Santos Laguna Premier	Torreón, Coahuila	TSM External Field 5	1,000
Tigres Premier	General Zuazua, Nuevo León	Instalaciones de Zuazua	800
Tijuana Premier	Tijuana, Baja California	Caliente	27,333
Titanes de Saltillo	Saltillo, Coahuila	Olímpico Francisco I. Madero	7,000
UdeG "B"	Ameca, Jalisco	Núcleo Deportivo y de Espectáculos Ameca	4,000
Zacatecas "B"	Zacatecas City, Zacatecas	Francisco Villa	14,000

==== Group 2 ====
Location of teams in the 2016–17 LPA Group 2

Club	City	Stadium	Capacity
Atlético Estado de México	Cuautitlán Izcalli, State of Mexico	Hugo Sánchez Márquez	3,500
Cachorros UdeG	Tepatitlán de Morelos, Jalisco	Gregorio "Tepa" Gómez	12,500
Coras "B"	Tepic, Nayarit	Olímpico Santa Teresita	4,000
Cruz Azul Hidalgo	Jasso, Hidalgo	10 de Diciembre	7,761
Irapuato	Irapuato, Guanajuato	Sergio León Chávez	25,000
La Piedad	La Piedad, Michoacán	Juan N. López	13,356
León Premier	León, Guanajuato	Casa Club León	1,000
Morelia Premier	Morelia, Michoacán	Morelos Adjacent Field	1,000
Necaxa Premier	Aguascalientes City, Aguascalientes	Casa Club Necaxa	1,000
Pachuca Premier	San Agustín Tlaxiaca, Hidalgo	Universidad del Fútbol	1,000
Querétaro Premier	Querétaro City, Querétaro	Corregidora	34,070
Real Zamora	Zamora, Michoacán	Zamora	7,200
Santos de Soledad	Soledad de Graciano Sánchez, San Luis Potosí	Plan de San Luis	18,000
Tepatitlán	Tepatitlán de Morelos, Jalisco	Gregorio "Tepa" Gómez	12,500
Toluca	Metepec, State of Mexico	Instalaciones de Metepec	1,000
Tuzos UAZ	Zacatecas City, Zacatecas	Francisco Villa	14,000

==== Group 3 ====
Location of teams in the 2016–17 LPA Group 3

Club	City	Stadium	Capacity
Albinegros de Orizaba	Orizaba, Veracruz	Socum	7,000
América Premier	Coyoacán, Mexico City	Instalaciones Club América	1,000
Athletic Club Morelos	Cuernavaca, Morelos	Mariano Matamoros	16,000
Chapulineros	Oaxaca City, Oaxaca	Tecnológico de Oaxaca	14,598
Chiapas Premier	Tuxtla Gutiérrez, Chiapas	Field 2 Zoque VMR	1,000
Cruz Azul Premier	Jasso, Hidalgo	10 de Diciembre	7,761
Inter Playa	Playa del Carmen, Quintana Roo	Unidad Deportiva Mario Villanueva Madrid	7,500
Ocelotes UNACH	San Cristóbal de las Casas, Chiapas	Municipal de San Cristóbal de las Casas	4,000
Pioneros de Cancún	Cancún, Quintana Roo	Andrés Quintana Roo	17,289
Politécnico	Oaxtepec, Morelos	Olímpico U.D. IMSS	9,000
Puebla Premier	Puebla City, Puebla	Unidad Deportiva Mario Vázquez Raña	800
Real Cuautitlán	Texcoco, State of Mexico	Municipal Claudio Suárez	4,000
Sporting Canamy	Xochimilco, Mexico City	Valentín González	5,000
Tlaxcala	Tlaxcala City, Tlaxcala	Tlahuicole	7,000
UNAM Premier	Coyoacán, Mexico City	La Cantera	2,000
Veracruz Premier	Coatzacoalcos, Veracruz	Rafael Hernández Ochoa	4,800

=== Regular season ===
==== Group 1 ====
===== Standings =====
Pos	Team	Pld	W	D	L	GF	GA	GD	Pts	Qualification
1	Monterrey Premier	15	10	4	1	37	14	+23	38	Advance to Liguilla de Filiales
2	Guadalajara Premier	15	10	2	3	27	15	+12	35	Advance to Liguilla de Filiales
3	Tigres Premier	15	7	5	3	25	18	+7	30	Advance to Liguilla de Filiales
4	Tijuana Premier	15	8	3	4	21	15	+6	30	Advance to Liguilla de Filiales
5	Reynosa	15	8	2	5	24	15	+9	29	Advance to Liguilla
6	Cuervos de Ensenada	15	6	5	4	23	20	+3	25	Advance to Liguilla
7	Zacatecas "B"	15	6	4	5	24	20	+4	24	
8	Alacranes de Durango	15	6	2	7	22	27	−5	22	
9	Dorados Fuerza UACH	15	5	6	4	18	20	−2	21	
10	Atlas Premier	15	6	2	7	20	26	−6	21	
11	Santos Laguna Premier	15	5	4	6	17	25	−8	19	
12	UdeG "B"	15	4	4	7	23	22	+1	18	
13	Mineros de Fresnillo	15	4	3	8	18	23	−5	15	
14	Murciélagos "B"	15	4	2	9	21	28	−7	15	
15	Cimarrones "B"	15	3	4	8	21	28	−7	14	
16	Titanes de Saltillo	15	0	4	11	10	35	−25	4	

Updated to match(es) played on November 20, 2016. Source: SoccerWay

===== Results =====
Home \ Away	ALD	ATS	CIM	CUE	DFU	GDL	MFR	MTY	MUR	REY	SAN	TIG	TIJ	TIS	UDG	ZAS
Alacranes			3–2		3–1	0–2	1–1	1–3	2–1	0–3						2–1
Atlas Premier	1–0			3–2		0–2		0–2	2–1			2–2		3–0		
Cimarrones		1–2			0–0		1–2			2–2	6–2		1–0		2–0	
Cuervos	5–2		1–1			2–1		2–2	3–1	0–3				1–0		2–1
Dorados UACH		4–2		0–0			2–1				1–0	3–3	2–0		1–1	2–1
Guadalajara			2–1		1–0		2–0	0–0	5–4	1–0					1–0	6–1
Mineros Fresnillo		1–1		2–2							5–0	0–2	0–1	2–0	0–2	0–2
Monterrey			3–1		3–0		5–2			3–1	3–1		2–0		2–2	
Murciélagos			2–1		1–1		0–1	0–2		1–2			3–3		2–1	
Reynosa		0–1			3–0		2–1				2–1	0–2	1–1		3–0	
Santos Laguna	1–0	3–2		0–1		0–0			2–1			1–1		2–0		
Tigres	0–0		3–0	2–1		3–1		2–1	0–2					0–0		
Tijuana	2–0	1–0		1–0		3–0					1–2	2–1		2–1		
Titanes	3–5		2–2		1–1	1–3		0–4	1–2	1–2						0–0
UdeG	1–3	4–0		1–1							1–1	2–4	0–2	6–0		2–0
Zacatecas		3–1	4–0					2–2	2–0	1–0	1–1	3–0	2–2			

Updated to match(es) played on 20 November 2016. Source: SoccerWay
Legend: Blue = home team win; Yellow = draw; Red = away team win.

==== Group 2 ====
===== Standings =====
Pos	Team	Pld	W	D	L	GF	GA	GD	Pts	Qualification
1	Tepatitlán	15	9	3	3	32	17	+15	32	Advance to Liguilla
2	Morelia Premier	15	10	1	4	27	17	+10	32	Advance to Liguilla de Filiales
3	Toluca Premier	15	8	3	4	25	15	+10	28	Advance to Liguilla de Filiales
4	Santos de Soledad	15	7	4	4	24	18	+6	26	Advance to Liguilla
5	Irapuato	15	7	3	5	26	21	+5	25	Advance to Liguilla
6	Cachorros UdeG	15	6	5	4	22	19	+3	25	
7	Atlético Estado de México	15	6	5	4	19	13	+6	23	
8	Querétaro Premier	15	5	7	3	22	16	+6	22	Advance to Liguilla de Filiales
9	Tuzos UAZ	15	6	3	6	24	23	+1	22	
10	Necaxa Premier	15	6	2	7	21	26	−5	21	
11	León	15	4	6	5	20	23	−3	19	
12	La Piedad	15	4	4	7	16	24	−8	18	
13	Coras "B"	15	5	3	7	15	24	−9	18	
14	Real Zamora	15	4	4	7	17	24	−7	16	
15	Cruz Azul Hidalgo	15	1	4	10	14	27	−13	8	
16	Pachuca	15	1	5	9	9	26	−17	8	

Updated to match(es) played on November 20, 2016. Source: SoccerWay

===== Results =====
Home \ Away	AEM	CAG	COR	CRH	IRA	LAP	LEO	MOR	NEC	PAC	QRO	RZA	SAS	TEP	TOL	UAZ
Atlético Estado de México				0–0		4–0	0–1	3–0	2–0		0–0			2–5		3–1
Cachorros UdeG	1–0		2–2	1–0			1–1			3–0		1–1	2–2		3–1	
Coras	0–0					1–0	1–0			1–1		0–1	2–1			0–4
Cruz Azul Hidalgo			3–0			1–4			0–1	2–3	0–1	2–2		1–2	1–1	
Irapuato	2–3	2–0	5–4	0–0						4–0		1–0	0–1		1–1	
La Piedad		1–2			1–1			2–1	1–3		0–0			0–0	1–3	
León				3–0	2–3	2–2		0–2	1–1		1–1			2–2		3–2
Morelia		3–1	3–0	3–2	2–1					3–1		3–0	2–1		0–1	
Necaxa		2–3	0–1		0–1			3–1		3–1		3–1			2–1	
Pachuca	0–0					0–1	0–1				1–2	0–0	0–0			0–0
Querétaro		1–1	1–0		4–1			0–1	5–1					1–1	1–1	
Real Zamora	0–0					3–1	3–1				4–2		1–3	0–3		1–2
Santos Soledad	1–2			2–1		2–0	1–1		4–1		1–1			3–2		2–1
Tepatitlán		1–0	2–1		3–2			1–2	3–0	4–1					2–0	
Toluca	2–0		1–2				4–1			2–1		2–0	2–0			3–0
Tuzos UAZ		2–1		4–1	0–2	1–2		1–1	1–1		3–2			2–1		

Updated to match(es) played on November 20, 2016. Source: SoccerWay
Legend: Blue = home team win; Yellow = draw; Red = away team win.

==== Group 3 ====
===== Standings =====
Pos	Team	Pld	W	D	L	GF	GA	GD	Pts	Qualification
1	Pioneros de Cancún	15	12	2	1	39	11	+28	41	Advance to Liguilla
2	Tlaxcala	15	9	4	2	30	15	+15	32	Advance to Liguilla
3	Albinegros de Orizaba	15	10	2	3	24	20	+4	32	Advance to Liguilla
4	Chapulineros de Oaxaca	15	8	5	2	23	10	+13	31	
5	Puebla Premier	15	7	4	4	26	20	+6	26	Advance to Liguilla de Filiales
6	Real Cuautitlán	15	4	6	5	22	21	+1	21	
7	Inter Playa	15	6	2	7	23	23	0	21	
8	Athletic Club Morelos	15	5	4	6	15	19	−4	20	
9	Cruz Azul Premier	15	4	6	5	11	14	−3	19	
10	América Premier	15	5	3	7	20	21	−1	18	
11	Sporting Canamy	15	5	1	9	21	29	−8	18	
12	Ocelotes UNACH	15	5	2	8	12	20	−8	18	
13	UNAM Premier	15	4	4	7	19	26	−7	17	
14	Veracruz Premier	15	3	5	7	17	17	0	14	
15	Chiapas Premier	15	3	2	10	17	35	−18	11	
16	FC Politécnico	15	2	4	9	15	33	−18	10	

Updated to match(es) played on November 20, 2016. Source: SoccerWay

===== Results =====
Home \ Away	ALB	AME	ATM	CHA	CHI	CRZ	INP	OUC	PIO	POL	PUE	RCU	SPC	TLA	UNM	VER
Albinegros			4–1	1–3				1–0	1–5		2–1			3–2	1–1	
América	1–2		0–0		2–3		1–1			3–1			3–1			2–0
Athletic Morelos				0–0				0–1	1–2		1–2	2–1		1–0	3–2	
Chapulineros		2–1				1–1	3–0	3–0	0–2			1–0			1–1	0–0
Chiapas	1–2		3–0	1–1		1–2			0–3		1–2			1–3	1–4	
Cruz Azul Premier	0–1	1–2	0–0				1–0				1–1	1–2		0–0		0–0
Inter Playa	2–3		1–1		5–0					2–0	2–1		4–1			2–0
Ocelotes UNACH		1–0			0–0	0–1	2–0			2–2		2–1	0–2			2–1
Pioneros		3–1				0–0	3–0	4–0		4–0		1–0			5–1	1–0
Politécnico	0–1		0–1	0–4	1–0	1–3					3–1		1–3	1–1		
Puebla		3–2		0–1				1–0	2–2			4–3		1–1	4–1	
Real Cuautitlán	2–0	1–1			2–1		3–1			3–3			0–0			2–2
Sporting Canamy	0–1		3–2	1–2	3–4	3–0			1–2		0–3			0–3		
Tlaxcala		2–0		2–1			4–1	2–1	4–2			2–2			3–1	
UNAM		0–1				2–0	0–2	2–1		1–1		0–0	1–2			2–1
Veracruz Premier	1–1		0–2		5–0					4–1	0–0		3–1	0–1		

Updated to match(es) played on November 20, 2016. Source: SoccerWay
Legend: Blue = home team win; Yellow = draw; Red = away team win.

=== Regular-season statistics ===
==== Top goalscorers ====
Players sorted first by goals scored, then by last name.

Rank	Player	Club	Goals
1	(Mexico) Lizandro Echeverría	Pioneros de Cancún	11
2	(Mexico) Omar Rosas	Santos de Soledad	11
2	(Mexico) Abraham Ávalos	Reynosa F.C.	11
2	(Mexico) Julio Cruz	Monterrey Premier	11
5	(Mexico) Alejandro Rubio	Tigres UANL Premier	10

Source: Liga Premier

=== Liguilla ===
==== Liguilla de Ascenso (Promotion Playoffs) ====
The four best teams of each group play two games against each other on a home-and-away basis. The higher seeded teams play on their home field during the second leg. The winner of each match up is determined by aggregate score. In the quarterfinals and semifinals, if the two teams are tied on aggregate the higher seeded team advances. In the final, if the two teams are tied after both legs, the match goes to extra time and, if necessary, a penalty shoot-out.

Quarter-finals
3	Tlaxcala	1	2	3
6	Santos	0	0	0
1	Pioneros	0	2	2
8	Cuervos (a)	0	2	2
4	Albinegros	2	0	2
5	Reynosa	1	0	1
2	Tepatitlán	1	3	4
7	Irapuato	1	5	6

Semi-finals
3	Tlaxcala	0	4	4
8	Cuervos	0	0	0
4	Albinegros	2	0	2
7	Irapuato	3	0	3

Final
3	Tlaxcala (pen.)	3	2	5 (4)
7	Irapuato	3	2	5 (2)

==== Quarter-finals ====
The first legs was played on 26 and 27 November, and the second legs was played on 3 December 2016.

Team 1	Agg.	Team 2	1st leg	2nd leg
Tlaxcala	3–0	Santos de Soledad	1–0	2–0
Pioneros de Cancún	2–2	Cuervos de Ensenada (a)	0–0	2–2
Albinegros de Orizaba	2–1	Reynosa	2–1	0–0
Tepatitlán	4–6	Irapuato	1–1	3–5

===== First leg =====
26 November 2016	Santos de Soledad	0–1	Tlaxcala	San Luis Potosí City, S.L.P.
19:00		Report	Santillán 33'	Stadium: Estadio Plan de San Luis; Attendance: 550

26 November 2016	Reynosa	1–2	Albinegros de Orizaba	Reynosa, Tamaulipas
19:45	Muñoz 59'	Report	Velasco 23'; Manzo 45'	Stadium: Unidad Deportiva Solidaridad; Attendance: 5,000

27 November 2016	Cuervos de Ensenada	0–0	Pioneros de Cancún	Ensenada, Baja California
12:00		Report		Stadium: Estadio Municipal de Ensenada; Attendance: 1,000

27 November 2016	Irapuato	1–1	Tepatitlán	Irapuato, Guanajuato
15:00	Favela 72'	Report	Sifuentes 36'	Stadium: Estadio Sergio León Chávez; Attendance: 6,000

===== Second leg =====
3 December 2016	Albinegros de Orizaba	0–0 (2–1 agg.)	Reynosa	Orizaba, Veracruz
12:00		Report		Stadium: Estadio Socum; Attendance: 6,000

3 December 2016	Pioneros de Cancún	2–2 (2–2 agg.)	Cuervos de Ensenada	Cancún, Quintana Roo
15:00	Echeverría 50'; Rodríguez 63'	Report	Soria 45'; Torres 78'	Stadium: Estadio Andrés Quintana Roo; Attendance: 4,000

3 December 2016	Tepatitlán	3–5 (4–6 agg.)	Irapuato	Tepatitlán de Morelos, Jalisco
16:00	Martínez 9', 79', 83'	Report	Sosa 1'; Razo 3', 12', 68'; Estrada 39'	Stadium: Estadio Gregorio "Tepa" Gómez; Attendance: 7,000

3 December 2016	Tlaxcala	2–0 (3–0 agg.)	Santos de Soledad	Tlaxcala City, Tlaxcala
18:00	Mañón 41'; Morales 82'	Report		Stadium: Estadio Tlahuicole; Attendance: 4,725

==== Semi-finals ====
The first legs was played on 7 December, and the second legs was played on 10 December 2016.

Team 1	Agg.	Team 2	1st leg	2nd leg
Tlaxcala	4–0	Cuervos de Ensenada	0–0	4–0
Albinegros de Orizaba	2–3	Irapuato	2–3	0–0

===== First leg =====
7 December 2016	Cuervos de Ensenada	0–0	Tlaxcala	Ensenada, Baja California
12:00		Report		Stadium: Estadio Municipal de Ensenada; Attendance: 1,500

7 December 2016	Irapuato	3–2	Albinegros de Orizaba	Irapuato, Guanajuato
20:00	Favela 14', 29'; González 65'	Report	Holgado 80'; García 84'	Stadium: Estadio Sergio León Chávez; Attendance: 15,000

===== Second leg =====
10 December 2016	Albinegros de Orizaba	0–0 (2–3 agg.)	Irapuato	Orizaba, Veracruz
12:00		Report		Stadium: Estadio Socum; Attendance: 5,000

10 December 2016	Tlaxcala	4–0 (4–0 agg.)	Cuervos de Ensenada	Tlaxcala City, Tlaxcala
18:00	Mañón 40'; Rodríguez 54'; Castro 66'; Díaz 80'	Report		Stadium: Estadio Tlahuicole; Attendance: 6,000

==== Final ====
The first leg was played on 14 December, and the second leg was played on 17 December 2016.

Team 1	Agg.	Team 2	1st leg	2nd leg
Tlaxcala (pen.)	5–5	Irapuato	3–3	2–2

===== First leg =====
14 December 2016	Irapuato	3–3	Tlaxcala	Irapuato, Guanajuato
20:00	Razo 67'; Favela 70', 90+1'	Report	Silva 38' (o.g.); Mañón 10', 78'	Stadium: Estadio Sergio León Chávez; Attendance: 21,000

===== Second leg =====
17 December 2016	Tlaxcala	2–2 (5–5 agg.) (4–2 p)	Irapuato	Tlaxcala City, Tlaxcala
18:00	Santillán 35'; Sosa 71' (a.g.)	Report	Razo 14', 69'	Stadium: Estadio Tlahuicole; Attendance: 7,000

Apertura 2016 winners:
Tlaxcala F.C.
1st Title

==== Liguilla de Filiales (Reserve Teams Playoffs) ====
The eight best reserve teams are divided into two groups of four clubs, the members play round-trip matches in round robin format. The leaders of the groups qualified to the final, which is played in two legs, to determine the champion of reserve teams.

===== Group 1 =====
Pos	Team	Pld	W	D	L	GF	GA	GD	Pts	Qualification
1	Morelia Premier	6	5	0	1	11	4	+7	16	Advance to Championship final
2	Monterrey Premier	6	2	3	1	7	5	+2	9	
3	Puebla Premier	6	1	2	3	5	10	−5	5	
4	Tijuana Premier	6	1	1	4	8	12	−4	4	

===== Group 2 =====
Pos	Team	Pld	W	D	L	GF	GA	GD	Pts	Qualification
1	León Premier	6	4	1	1	10	4	+6	14	Advance to Championship final
2	Querétaro Premier	6	3	2	1	10	9	+1	11	
3	Tigres Premier	6	2	0	4	5	7	−2	6	
4	UNAM Premier	6	1	1	4	7	12	−5	5	

===== Final =====
The first leg was played on 15 December, and the second leg was played on 18 December 2016.

Team 1	Agg.	Team 2	1st leg	2nd leg
Querétaro Premier (pen.)	3–3	Morelia Premier	1–1	2–2

== Torneo Clausura ==
=== Changes from the previous tournament ===
47 teams participated in this tournament. Coras "B" was withdrawn before the start of the competition and all his matches were canceled.

=== Regular season ===
==== Group 1 ====
===== Standings =====
Pos	Team	Pld	W	D	L	GF	GA	GD	Pts	Qualification or relegation
1	Guadalajara Premier	15	9	4	2	26	15	+11	35	Advance to Liguilla de Filiales
2	Mineros de Fresnillo	15	8	5	2	25	17	+8	31	Advance to Liguilla
3	Tigres Premier	15	8	5	2	23	13	+10	29	Advance to Liguilla de Filiales
4	Santos Laguna Premier	15	7	6	2	23	15	+8	29	Advance to Liguilla de Filiales
5	Monterrey	15	6	6	3	30	22	+8	25	
6	Murciélagos "B"	15	5	6	4	20	20	0	23	Advance to Liguilla
7	Dorados Fuerza UACH	15	5	5	5	18	21	−3	22	
8	UdeG "B"	15	6	3	6	25	26	−1	21	
9	Reynosa	15	6	2	7	22	21	+1	20	
10	Atlas Premier	15	4	6	5	18	21	−3	20	
11	Zacatecas "B"	15	5	3	7	23	18	+5	18	
12	Cimarrones "B"	15	5	3	7	22	26	−4	18	
13	Tijuana Premier	15	3	4	8	25	27	−2	15	
14	Cuervos de Ensenada	15	3	5	7	12	25	−13	15	
15	Alacranes de Durango	15	3	4	8	10	19	−9	13	
16	Titanes de Saltillo	15	2	3	10	17	43	−26	9	Relegated to Liga de Nuevos Talentos

Updated to match(es) played on April 16, 2017. Source: SoccerWay

===== Results =====
Home \ Away	ALD	ATS	CIM	CUE	DFU	GDL	MFR	MTY	MUR	REY	SAN	TIG	TIJ	TIS	UDG	ZAS
Alacranes		1–2		0–0							1–1	1–0	2–0	0–0	1–2	
Atlas Premier			2–2		2–2		1–2			1–0	0–0		2–0		1–2	1–0
Cimarrones	2–0			0–1		0–2		2–1	1–1			1–2		3–1		2–1
Cuervos		1–1			0–0		2–0				0–1	1–2	2–0		3–3	
Dorados UACH	1–0		2–2			1–0		0–0	2–0	1–1				3–1		
Guadalajara	0–0	2–0		1–0							3–0	2–2	2–1	2–1		
Mineros Fresnillo	3–1		3–2		3–2	1–1		0–2	3–0	2–1						
Monterrey	3–1	1–1		1–1		0–2			1–1			1–1		7–1		1–1
Murciélagos	3–0	2–1		1–0		3–3					1–1	2–1		2–0		1–2
Reynosa	1–0		0–1	2–0		3–5		1–2	2–0					5–3		2–0
Santos Laguna			3–2		0–1		2–2	3–1		1–0			2–2		2–0	2–1
Tigres		3–0			3–2		0–0			1–1	0–0		2–1		2–0	3–1
Tijuana			3–1		3–0		1–2	3–4	1–1	2–3					4–0	2–2
Titanes		3–3		2–1			1–3				1–5	0–1	2–2		1–0	
UdeG			4–1		3–1	0–1	1–1	4–5	2–2	2–0						
Zacatecas	1–2			1–0	3–0	3–0	0–0							6–0	1–2	

Updated to match(es) played on 16 April 2017. Source: SoccerWay
Legend: Blue = home team win; Yellow = draw; Red = away team win.

==== Group 2 ====
===== Standings =====
Pos	Team	Pld	W	D	L	GF	GA	GD	Pts	Qualification
1	Irapuato	14	8	4	2	31	17	+14	32	Advance to Liguilla
2	La Piedad	14	8	4	2	20	11	+9	30	Advance to Liguilla
3	Morelia Premier	14	7	2	5	26	17	+9	26	Advance to Liguilla de Filiales
4	Querétaro Premier	14	7	4	3	18	11	+7	27	Advance to Liguilla de Filiales
5	León Premier	14	6	6	2	23	17	+6	26	Advance to Liguilla de Filiales
6	Cruz Azul Hidalgo	14	7	3	4	21	16	+5	24	Advance to Liguilla
7	Atlético Estado de México	14	5	4	5	18	15	+3	21	
8	Tepatitlán	14	4	5	5	14	20	−6	19	
9	Toluca Premier	14	4	6	4	9	9	0	18	
10	Tuzos UAZ	14	5	2	7	16	21	−5	18	
11	Necaxa Premier	14	4	3	7	20	28	−8	18	
12	Pachuca Premier	14	4	4	6	15	19	−4	17	
13	Real Zamora	14	2	6	6	16	19	−3	12	
14	Cachorros UdeG	14	2	4	8	14	25	−11	11	
15	Santos de Soledad	14	2	3	9	14	30	−16	10	

Updated to match(es) played on April 16, 2017. Source: SoccerWay

===== Results =====
Home \ Away	AEM	CAG	CRH	IRA	LAP	LEO	MOR	NEC	PAC	QRO	RZA	SAS	TEP	TOL	UAZ
Atlético Estado de México		2–0		2–2					3–1		1–1	2–2		0–1	
Cachorros UdeG				1–3	1–3		1–3	2–3		0–1			1–1		3–0
Cruz Azul Hidalgo	2–0	4–1		2–1		1–1	1–2					1–3			2–0
Irapuato					1–2	2–0	1–1	3–2		3–1			4–1		4–1
La Piedad	2–1		2–1			1–2			1–0		0–0	3–0			1–1
León	2–0	1–3							0–0		3–2	2–1		0–0	
Morelia	0–1				2–0	0–3		5–0		1–0			0–1		0–0
Necaxa	0–0		3–1		2–2	3–3				0–3		2–3	0–2		0–2
Pachuca		0–0	2–2	1–3			0–2	1–3					3–0	2–1	
Querétaro	1–0		0–0		0–2	1–1			1–1		3–2	2–0			2–0
Real Zamora		3–0	1–2	3–3			3–2	0–2	0–1					0–0	
Santos Soledad		1–1		0–1			2–6		0–3		0–0			0–1	
Tepatitlán	0–4		0–1		0–1	2–2				1–1	1–1	3–1			2–1
Toluca		0–0	0–1	0–0	0–0		4–2	1–0		0–2			0–0		
Tuzos UAZ	1–2					1–3			3–0		1–0	3–1		2–1	

Updated to match(es) played on April 16, 2017. Source: SoccerWay
Legend: Blue = home team win; Yellow = draw; Red = away team win.

==== Group 3 ====
===== Standings =====
Pos	Team	Pld	W	D	L	GF	GA	GD	Pts	Qualification or relegation
1	Tlaxcala	15	8	6	1	29	12	+17	31	Advance to Liguilla
2	Pioneros de Cancún	15	8	3	4	27	16	+11	31	Advance to Liguilla
3	UNAM Premier	15	8	5	2	23	13	+10	30	Advance to Liguilla de Filiales
4	América Premier	15	8	3	4	34	26	+8	30	Advance to Liguilla de Filiales
5	Inter Playa	15	8	2	5	26	19	+7	28	Advance to Liguilla
6	Real Cuautitlán	15	8	3	4	27	20	+7	27	
7	Chapulineros de Oaxaca	15	6	5	4	25	20	+5	25	
8	Veracruz Premier	15	7	2	6	19	20	−1	25	
9	Albinegros de Orizaba	15	7	1	7	24	21	+3	23	
10	Athletic Club Morelos	15	6	1	8	27	31	−4	19	
11	FC Politécnico	15	4	5	6	17	33	−16	17	Relegated to Liga de Nuevos Talentos
12	Cruz Azul Premier	15	5	1	9	31	29	+2	16	
13	Ocelotes UNACH	15	3	5	7	18	28	−10	16	
14	Chiapas Premier	15	4	3	8	14	28	−14	16	
15	Puebla Premier	15	3	2	10	11	22	−11	11	
16	Sporting Canamy	15	2	3	10	10	24	−14	9	

Updated to match(es) played on April 16, 2017. Source: SoccerWay

===== Results =====
Home \ Away	ALB	AME	ATM	CHA	CHI	CRZ	INP	OUC	PIO	POL	PUE	RCU	SPC	TLA	UNM	VER
Albinegros		3–1			1–2	2–1	0–3			3–0		2–1	3–1			2–0
América				2–1		4–0		2–2	5–1		2–0	3–2		2–1	1–2	
Athletic Morelos	2–1	3–5			0–2	4–2	2–1			9–3			2–1			1–1
Chapulineros	2–2		2–0		5–1					1–1	3–0		1–0	1–1		
Chiapas		1–1					0–4	0–2		1–0		3–4	1–0			2–2
Cruz Azul Premier				3–0	4–1			6–1	1–2	1–2			5–0		1–1	
Inter Playa		2–0		1–1		3–2		4–3	1–0			2–3		2–5	2–1	
Ocelotes UNACH	3–2		3–1	0–2					0–3		1–1			1–1	0–1	
Pioneros	1–2		3–0	3–0	2–0						1–0		3–0	2–2		
Politécnico		1–3					0–0	1–1	1–1			1–1			1–3	2–1
Puebla	1–0		2–3		2–0	1–2	0–1			1–2			2–1			0–2
Real Cuautitlán			1–0	2–3		5–2		2–0	2–1		1–1			1–1	1–0	
Sporting Canamy		2–2					1–0	1–1		0–1		0–1			0–1	3–1
Tlaxcala	1–0		1–0		1–0	1–0				7–1	1–0		0–0			5–1
UNAM	2–1		3–0	3–3	0–0				2–2		2–0			1–1		
Veracruz Premier		5–1		1–0		2–1	1–0	1–0	0–2			1–0			0–1	

Updated to match(es) played on April 16, 2017. Source: SoccerWay
Legend: Blue = home team win; Yellow = draw; Red = away team win.

=== Regular-season statistics ===
==== Top goalscorers ====
Players sorted first by goals scored, then by last name.

Rank	Player	Club	Goals
1	(Mexico) Joaquín Hernández	Monterrey Premier	15
2	(Mexico) Francisco Rivera	América Premier	14
3	(Mexico) Lizandro Echeverría	Pioneros de Cancún	12
3	(Mexico) Rafael Nájera	Cruz Azul Premier	12
4	(Mexico) Fernando Ortíz	Monarcas Morelia Premier	10

Source: Liga Premier

=== Liguilla ===
==== Liguilla de Ascenso (Promotion Playoffs) ====
The four best teams of each group play two games against each other on a home-and-away basis. The higher seeded teams play on their home field during the second leg. The winner of each match up is determined by aggregate score. In the quarterfinals and semifinals, if the two teams are tied on aggregate the higher seeded team advances. In the final, if the two teams are tied after both legs, the match goes to extra time and, if necessary, a penalty shoot-out.

Quarter-finals
1	Irapuato	-	-	-
8	Murciélagos "B" (*)	-	-	-
3	Pioneros	0	3	3
6	Fresnillo	1	0	3
4	La Piedad	1	1	2
5	Cruz Azul Hidalgo	1	0	1
2	Tlaxcala	1	3	4
7	Inter Playa	1	1	2

Semi-finals
1	Irapuato	1	3	4
3	Pioneros	3	0	3
4	La Piedad	1	0	1
2	Tlaxcala	1	1	2

Final
1	Irapuato	0	0	0
2	Tlaxcala	3	1	4

(*) Murciélagos "B" was disqualified for having debts with the FMF. Irapuato qualified directly to the semi-finals

==== Quarter-finals ====
The first legs was played on 22 and 23 April, and the second legs was played on 29 April 2017.

Team 1	Agg.	Team 2	1st leg	2nd leg
Irapuato	–	Murciélagos "B"	–	–
Pioneros de Cancún	3–1	Mineros de Fresnillo	0–1	3–0
Reboceros de La Piedad	2–1	Cruz Azul Hidalgo	1–1	1–0
Tlaxcala	4–2	Inter Playa	1–1	3–1

===== First leg =====
22 April 2017	Inter Playa	1–1	Tlaxcala	Playa del Carmen, Quintana Roo
18:00	Da Costa 52'	Report	Almanza 71'	Stadium: Estadio Mario Villanueva Madrid; Attendance: 2,000; Referee: Rodolfo Villanueva

22 April 2017	Mineros de Fresnillo	1–0	Pioneros de Cancún	Fresnillo, Zacatecas
19:00	Torres 54'	Report		Stadium: Unidad Deportiva Minera Fresnillo; Attendance: 1,500; Referee: Jesús Ruíz

23 April 2017	Cruz Azul Hidalgo	1–1	Reboceros de La Piedad	Ciudad Cruz Azul, Hidalgo
12:00	Torres 53'	Report	Cárdenas 88'	Stadium: Estadio 10 de Diciembre; Attendance: 300; Referee: Edgar Rangel

===== Second leg =====
29 April 2017	Tlaxcala	3–1 (4–2 agg.)	Inter Playa	Tlaxcala City, Tlaxcala
18:00	López 57'; Bautista 58'; Mañón 74'	Report	Da Costa 3'	Stadium: Estadio Tlahuicole; Attendance: 6,000; Referee: Iván Martínez

29 April 2017	Pioneros de Cancún	3–0 (3–1 agg.)	Mineros de Fresnillo	Cancún, Quintana Roo
18:00	Chávez 33'; Echeverría 43'; Zavala 55'	Report		Stadium: Estadio Andrés Quintana Roo; Attendance: 3,000; Referee: Gilberto Alvarado

29 April 2017	Reboceros de La Piedad	1–0 (2–1 agg.)	Cruz Azul Hidalgo	La Piedad, Michoacán
20:00	Frausto 63'	Report		Stadium: Estadio Juan N. López; Attendance: 5,700; Referee: Alan Martínez

==== Semi-finals ====
The first legs was played on 3 May, and the second legs was played on 6 May 2017.

Team 1	Agg.	Team 2	1st leg	2nd leg
Irapuato	4–3	Pioneros de Cancún	1–3	3–0
Reboceros de La Piedad	1–2	Tlaxcala	1–1	0–1

===== First leg =====
3 May 2017	Pioneros de Cancún	3–1	Irapuato	Cancún, Quintana Roo
19:00	Zavala 19'; Echeverría 23'; Rodríguez 48'	Report	Favela 52'	Stadium: Estadio Andrés Quintana Roo; Attendance: 3,000; Referee: Rodolfo Villanueva

3 May 2017	Tlaxcala	1–1	Reboceros de La Piedad	Tlaxcala City, Tlaxcala
19:30	Rodríguez 39'	Report	Góndola 47'	Stadium: Estadio Tlahuicole; Attendance: 5,500; Referee: Víctor Cáceres

===== Second leg =====
6 May 2017	Irapuato	3–0 (4–3 agg.)	Pioneros de Cancún	Irapuato, Guanajuato
19:00	Martínez 63', 90+3'; Razo 89'	Report		Stadium: Estadio Sergio León Chávez; Attendance: 6,500; Referee: Michel Caballero

6 May 2017	Reboceros de La Piedad	0–1 (1–2 agg.)	Tlaxcala	La Piedad, Michoacán
20:00		Report	Baéz 28'	Stadium: Estadio Juan N. López; Attendance: 10,200; Referee: Antonio Olalde

==== Final ====
The first leg was played on 10 May, and the second leg was played on 13 May 2017.

Team 1	Agg.	Team 2	1st leg	2nd leg
Irapuato	0–4	Tlaxcala	0–3	0–1

===== First leg =====
10 May 2017	Tlaxcala	3–0	Irapuato	Tlaxcala City, Tlaxcala
19:30	Mañón 27', 28'; Rodríguez 83'	Report		Stadium: Estadio Tlahuicole; Attendance: 6,000; Referee: Jesús Ruíz

===== Second leg =====
13 May 2017	Irapuato	0–1 (0–4 agg.)	Tlaxcala	Irapuato, Guanajuato
19:00		Report	Mañón 64'	Stadium: Estadio Sergio León Chávez; Attendance: 15,000; Referee: Iván Martínez

Clausura 2017 winners:
Tlaxcala F.C.
2nd Title

==== Liguilla de Filiales (Reserve Teams Playoffs) ====
The eight best reserve teams are divided into two groups of four clubs, the members play round-trip matches in round robin format. The leaders of the groups qualify to the final, which is played in two legs, to determine the champion of reserve teams.

===== Group 1 =====
Pos	Team	Pld	W	D	L	GF	GA	GD	Pts	Qualification
1	América Premier	6	3	2	1	11	6	+5	13	Advance to Championship final
2	Morelia Premier	6	3	2	1	10	5	+5	13	
3	Guadalajara Premier	6	2	1	3	10	11	−1	9	
4	Santos Laguna Premier	6	1	1	4	4	13	−9	4	

===== Group 2 =====
Pos	Team	Pld	W	D	L	GF	GA	GD	Pts	Qualification
1	León Premier	6	4	1	1	10	4	+6	14	Advance to Championship final
2	Querétaro Premier	6	3	2	1	10	9	+1	11	
3	Tigres Premier	6	2	0	4	5	7	−2	6	
4	UNAM Premier	6	1	1	4	7	12	−5	5	

===== Final =====
The first leg was played on 10 May, and the second leg was played on 13 May 2017.

Team 1	Agg.	Team 2	1st leg	2nd leg
América Premier (pen.)	4–4	León Premier	2–1	2–3

== Relegation Table ==
P	Team	Pts	G	Pts/G
1	Pioneros de Cancún	72	30	2.4000
2	Guadalajara Premier	70	30	2.3333
3	Tlaxcala F.C.	63	30	2.1000
4	Monterrey Premier	63	30	2.1000
5	Monarcas Morelia Premier	58	29	2
6	Tigres Premier	59	30	1.9667
7	Irapuato	57	29	1.9655
8	Chapulineros de Oaxaca	56	30	1.8667
9	Albinegros de Orizaba	55	30	1.8333
10	Tepatitlán	51	29	1.7586
11	Querétaro Premier	49	29	1.6897
12	Reboceros de La Piedad	48	29	1.6552
13	Inter Playa del Carmen	49	30	1.6333
14	Reynosa F.C.	49	30	1.6333
15	América Premier	48	30	1.6000
16	Real Cuautitlán	48	30	1.6000
17	Santos Laguna Premier	48	30	1.6000
18	Toluca Premier	46	29	1.5862
19	UNAM Premier	47	30	1.5667
20	León Premier	45	29	1.5517
21	Mineros de Fresnillo	46	30	1.5333
22	Atlético Estado de México	44	29	1.5172
23	Tijuana Premier	45	30	1.5000
24	Dorados UACH	43	30	1.4333
25	Zacatecas "B"	42	30	1.4000
26	Tuzos UAZ	40	29	1.3793
27	Atlas Premier	41	30	1.3667
28	Necaxa Premier	39	29	1.3448
29	Cuervos de Ensenada	40	30	1.3333
30	Veracruz Premier	39	30	1.3000
31	Athletic Club Morelos	39	30	1.3000
32	UdeG "B"	39	30	1.3000
33	Murciélagos "B"	38	30	1.2667
34	Cachorros UdeG	36	29	1.2414
35	Santos de Soledad	36	29	1.2414
36	Puebla Premier	37	30	1.2333
37	Alacranes de Durango	35	30	1.1667
38	Cruz Azul Premier	35	30	1.1667
39	Ocelotes UNACH	34	30	1.1333
40	Cruz Azul Hidalgo	32	29	1.1034
41	Cimarrones "B"	32	30	1.0667
42	Real Zamora	28	29	0.9655
43	Chiapas Premier	27	30	0.9000
44	Sporting Canamy	27	30	0.9000
45	FC Politécnico	27	30	0.9000
46	Pachuca	25	29	0.8621
47	Titanes de Saltillo	13	30	0.4333

Last updated: 20 April 2017
Source: Liga Premier FMF
P = Position; G = Games played; Pts = Points; Pts/G = Ratio of points to games played

== Promotion to Ascenso MX ==
As champion of the two tournaments of the season, Tlaxcala F.C. won the right to be promoted to Ascenso MX, however, because its stadium did not meet the requirements of the league, it was granted a one-year extension to be able to improve its facilities and join the league in 2018. In May 2018 the team lost its right to play at the Ascenso MX for not complying with the improvements in its stadium that were required to be able to participate in the division.

== See also ==
- 2016–17 Liga MX season
- 2016–17 Ascenso MX season
- 2016–17 Liga de Nuevos Talentos season
