= 2014–15 Liga de Nuevos Talentos season =

Liga de Nuevos Talentos
- Season: 2014–15
- Dates: 22 August 2014 – 10 May 2015
- Champions: Apertura: Mineros de Fresnillo; Clausura; Sahuayo F.C.
- Promoted: Real Zamora
- Top goalscorer: Apertura: Aldo Xavier Magaña (13 goals); Clausura; Luis Arellano (11 goals)
- Biggest home win: Apertura: Alto Rendimiento Tuzo 7–1 Cuautla (24 October 2014); Clausura; Alto Rendimiento Tuzo 6–1 Zitácuaro (27 February 2015)
- Biggest away win: Apertura: Deportivo San Juan 0–7 Necaxa (2 November 2014); Clausura; Centro Universitario 0–4 Chimalhuacán (20 March 2015)
- Highest scoring: Apertura: Alto Rendimiento Tuzo (34 points); Clausura; Atlético San Luis (31 points)
- Stats are from the regular season only

The 2014–15 Liga de Nuevos Talentos season was split in two tournaments Apertura and Clausura. Liga de Nuevos Talentos was the fourth–tier football league of Mexico. The season was played between 22 August 2014 and 10 May 2015.

== Torneo Apertura ==
=== Changes from the previous season ===
- Titanes de Tulancingo changed its name to Alto Rendimiento Tuzo.
- Real Zamora was promoted from Third Division.
- Sahuayo F.C. arrived as an expansion team.
- Promesas Altamira and Santos Los Mochis disappeared.

=== Stadiums and locations ===
==== Group 1 ====
Location of teams in the 2014–15 LNT Group 1

Club	City	Stadium	Capacity
Alebrijes "B"	Oaxaca, Oaxaca	Benito Juárez	10,250
Alto Rendimiento Tuzo	San Agustín Tlaxiaca, Hidalgo	Universidad del Fútbol	1,000
América Coapa	Mexico City	Instalaciones Club América	1,000
Cañoneros	Campeche, Campeche	Universitario de Campeche	4,000
Centro Universitario del Fútbol	San Agustín Tlaxiaca, Hidalgo	Universidad del Fútbol	1,000
Cuautla	Cuautla, Morelos	Isidro Gil Tapia	5,000
Deportivo Chimalhuacán	Chimalhuacán, State of Mexico	Tepalcates	5,000
Lobos Prepa	Puebla, Puebla	Universitario BUAP	19,283
Patriotas de Córdoba	Córdoba, Veracruz	Universidad Cristóbal Colón	1,000
Pumas Naucalpan	Mexico City	La Cantera	2,000
Selva Cañera	Zacatepec, Morelos	Agustín Coruco Díaz	24,313
Garzas UAEH	Pachuca, Hidalgo	Revolución Mexicana	3,500
Zorros UMSNH	Morelia, Michoacán	Olímpico UMSNH	4,000
Zitácuaro	Zitácuaro, Michoacán	Ignacio López Rayón	10,000

==== Group 2 ====
Location of teams in the 2014–15 LNT Group 2

Club	City	Stadium	Capacity
Académicos de Atlas	El Salto, Jalisco	CECAF	1,000
Atlético San Luis "B"	San Luis Potosí, S.L.P.	Alfonso Lastras	25,111
Cachorros UANL	General Zuazua, Nuevo León	Instalaciones de Zuazua	800
Calor	Gómez Palacio, Durango	Unidad Deportiva Francisco Gómez Palacio	4,000
Celaya "B"	Celaya, Guanajuato	Miguel Alemán Valdés	23,182
Chivas Rayadas	Zapopan, Jalisco	Verde Valle	800
Deportivo San Juan	San Juan de los Lagos, Jalisco	El Llanito	5,000
La Piedad	La Piedad, Michoacán	Juan N. López	13,356
Mineros de Fresnillo	Fresnillo, Zacatecas	Unidad Deportiva Minera Fresnillo	2,500
Necaxa "B"	Aguascalientes, Aguascalientes	Casa Club Necaxa	1,000
Real Zamora	Zamora, Michoacán	Unidad Deportiva El Chamizal	5,000
Sahuayo	Sahuayo, Michoacán	Unidad Deportiva Municipal	1,500
Topos de Reynosa	Reynosa, Tamaulipas	Unidad Deportiva Solidaridad	20,000
U.A. Tamaulipas	Ciudad Victoria, Tamaulipas	Eugenio Alvizo Porras	5,000

=== Regular season ===
==== Group 1 ====
===== Standings =====
Pos	Team	Pld	W	D	L	GF	GA	GD	Pts	Qualification
1	Alto Rendimiento Tuzo	13	10	2	1	33	10	+23	34	Advance to Liguilla de Copa
2	Selva Cañera	13	8	3	2	21	15	+6	30	Advance to Liguilla de Liga
3	América Coapa	13	8	2	3	26	13	+13	27	Advance to Liguilla de Copa
4	Pumas Naucalpan	13	7	3	3	26	14	+12	27	Advance to Liguilla de Copa
5	Garzas UAEH	13	4	5	4	21	19	+2	21	Advance to Liguilla de Liga
6	Zorros UMSNH	13	5	4	4	19	18	+1	21	Advance to Liguilla de Liga
7	Centro Universitario del Futbol	13	5	2	6	13	12	+1	19	Advance to Liguilla de Liga
8	Lobos Prepa	13	4	5	4	21	19	+2	18	Advance to Liguilla de Copa
9	Deportivo Chimalhuacán	13	5	2	6	23	23	0	17	
10	Patriotas de Córdoba	13	5	1	7	13	26	−13	17	
11	Cuautla	13	3	5	5	20	27	−7	15	
12	Alebrijes "B"	13	1	6	6	12	22	−10	10	
13	Cañoneros de Campeche	13	2	3	8	11	30	−19	9	
14	Zitácuaro	13	0	5	8	4	22	−18	5	

Source: SoccerWay

===== Results =====
Home \ Away	ALB	ART	AME	CAN	CUF	CUA	DCH	LOB	PTC	PUM	SVC	UAH	UMS	ZIT
Alebrijes		1–3		0–0		1–1		1–3				1–5	1–2	
AR Tuzo			1–0	3–1		7–1		2–1				3–0	3–0	
América Coapa	2–1						3–0		3–0	3–3	3–0			3–0
Cañoneros			3–1				1–1		1–0	0–3	0–5			1–1
CU Fútbol	0–0	0–0	0–1	3–1				2–1	0–2		0–1			
Cuautla			1–2	6–2	0–2		2–1	0–0				2–2	3–3	
Dep. Chimalhuacán	4–2	2–3			0–3				6–1	2–1	1–3			3–0
Lobos Prepa			1–1	1–0			2–0		6–3	0–3				0–0
Patriotas	0–0	0–4				0–2					2–1	3–2	1–0	
Pumas Naucalpan	1–1	2–3			3–1	3–1			1–0		1–1			3–0
Selva Cañera	1–1	2–1				3–0		3–2				3–2	1–1	
Garzas UAEH			0–2	4–1	1–0		2–2	2–2		1–0			0–0	
Zorros UMSNH			3–2	2–0	2–1		0–1	2–2		1–2				3–1
Zitácuaro	0–2	0–0			0–1	1–1			0–1		1–4	0–0		

Updated to match(es) played on 16 November 2014. Source: SoccerWay
Legend: Blue = home team win; Yellow = draw; Red = away team win.

==== Group 2 ====
===== Standings =====
Pos	Team	Pld	W	D	L	GF	GA	GD	Pts	Qualification
1	Académicos	13	7	4	2	26	12	+14	29	Advance to Liguilla de Copa
2	Chivas Rayadas	13	7	3	3	30	16	+14	26	Advance to Liguilla de Copa
3	Atlético San Luis "B"	13	5	5	3	20	13	+7	23	Advance to Liguilla de Liga
4	Mineros de Fresnillo	13	6	3	4	20	13	+7	22	Advance to Liguilla de Liga
5	Cachorros UANL	13	5	5	3	26	15	+11	21	Advance to Liguilla de Copa
6	Necaxa "B"	13	5	3	5	30	22	+8	20	Advance to Liguilla de Copa
7	Topos de Reynosa	13	6	2	5	18	21	−3	20	Advance to Liguilla de Liga
8	U.A. Tamaulipas	13	5	3	5	22	20	+2	19	Advance to Liguilla de Liga
9	Celaya "B"	13	5	2	6	23	22	+1	18	
10	Sahuayo	13	4	6	3	19	18	+1	18	
11	Real Zamora	13	5	2	6	22	25	−3	18	
12	La Piedad	13	4	4	5	20	32	−12	18	
13	Calor	13	4	1	8	19	24	−5	14	
14	Deportivo San Juan	13	1	1	11	9	51	−42	4	

Source: SoccerWay

===== Results =====
Home \ Away	ACD	ASL	CAC	CAL	CEL	CHR	DSJ	LAP	MFR	NEC	RZA	SHY	TPR	UAT
Académicos			1–0		0–2	2–2		4–1				2–1	0–0	
At. San Luis	1–1						4–0		1–2	3–0	2–2	0–0		1–0
Cachorros UANL		1–1		1–1	3–2			5–0	1–1				6–0	2–0
Calor	0–2	1–3					3–1		2–3	2–0	1–2			
Celaya		2–0		1–3			6–0	3–1	0–3	4–1				
Chivas Rayadas		0–2	1–1	4–2	1–1			6–0					2–0	5–0
Dep. San Juan	0–6		3–1			2–3				0–7	0–2	1–1		1–7
La Piedad		1–1		2–1			4–1		1–0	3–1	2–2			
Mineros Fresnillo	2–1					1–2	4–0			0–0	1–2	0–0		2–1
Necaxa	2–2		2–2			2–1					6–2	4–1	4–0	
Real Zamora	1–3		0–1		3–1	0–2						2–3	2–0	
Sahuayo			3–2	0–1	1–1	3–1		3–3					2–0	1–1
Topos		3–1		2–1	3–0		3–0	4–1	2–1					
UA Tamaulipas	0–2			3–1	3–0			1–1		2–1	3–2		1–1	

Updated to match(es) played on 16 November 2014. Source: SoccerWay
Legend: Blue = home team win; Yellow = draw; Red = away team win.

=== Regular-season statistics ===
==== Top goalscorers ====
Players sorted first by goals scored, then by last name.

Rank	Player	Club	Goals
1	(Mexico) Aldo Xavier Magaña	Alto Rendimiento Tuzo	13
1	(Mexico) Gerardo Escobedo	Cachorros UANL	13
3	(Mexico) Brandon Rosas	Real Zamora	12
4	(Mexico) José Alberto Moreno	Selva Cañera	11
4	(Mexico) Jonathan Valdivia	Necaxa "B"	11
4	(Mexico) Ricardo Zendejas	Garzas UAEH	11
7	(Mexico) Carlos Contreras	Calor	7
7	(Mexico) Eduardo del Río	Mineros de Fresnillo	7

Source: Liga Premier

=== Liguilla ===
==== Liguilla de Ascenso (Promotion Playoffs) ====
The four best teams of each group play two games against each other on a home-and-away basis. The higher seeded teams play on their home field during the second leg. The winner of each match up is determined by aggregate score. In the quarterfinals and semifinals, if the two teams are tied on aggregate the higher seeded team advances. In the final, if the two teams are tied after both legs, the match goes to extra time and, if necessary, a penalty shoot-out.

Quarter-finals
1	Selva Cañera	0	3	3
8	CU Fútbol	1	1	2
4	Garzas UAEH	2	2	4
5	Zorros UMSNH	1	2	3
2	Atlético San Luis	3	5	8
7	U.A. Tamaulipas	3	1	4
3	Mineros de Fresnillo	2	1	3
6	Topos de Reynosa	1	1	2

Semi-finals
1	Selva Cañera	1	1	2
4	Garzas UAEH	0	1	1
2	Atlético San Luis	0	5	5
3	Mineros de Fresnillo	3	3	6

Final
1	Selva Cañera	0	0	0
3	Mineros de Fresnillo	5	2	7

==== Quarter-finals ====
Team 1	Agg.	Team 2	1st leg	2nd leg
Selva Cañera	3–2	C.U. Fútbol	0–1	3–1
Garzas UAEH	4–3	Zorros UMSNH	2–1	2–2
Atlético San Luis	8–4	U.A. Tamaulipas	3–3	5–1
Mineros de Fresnillo	3–2	Topos de Reynosa	2–1	1–1

===== First leg =====
19 November 2014	Zorros UMSNH	1–2	Garzas UAEH	Morelia
15:00	Calderón 76'	Report	Urbano 16'; Pastrana 86'	Stadium: Estadio Venustiano Carranza; Attendance: 300

19 November 2014	Topos de Reynosa	1–2	Mineros de Fresnillo	Reynosa
15:00	Chávez 87'	Report	Del Río 16'; Muro 30'	Stadium: Unidad Deportiva Solidaridad; Attendance: 160

19 November 2014	U.A. Tamaulipas	3–3	Atlético San Luis	Ciudad Victoria
16:00	Hernández 25', 29'; Núñez 78'	Report	Cinco 30', 37', 57'	Stadium: Estadio Marte R. Gómez; Attendance: 800

20 November 2014	C.U. del Fútbol	1–0	Selva Cañera	San Agustín Tlaxiaca
11:00	López 50'	Report		Stadium: Universidad del Fútbol; Attendance: 150

===== Second leg =====
22 November 2014	Atlético San Luis	5–1 (8–4 agg.)	U.A. Tamaulipas	San Luis Potosí
12:00	Herrero 39'; Cinco 43'; Hernández 51', 65'; Vargas 80'	Report	Caldera 40'	Stadium: Estadio Alfonso Lastras; Attendance: 200

22 November 2014	Garzas UAEH	2–2 (4–3 agg.)	Zorros UMSNH	Tulancingo
15:30	Zendejas 52'; Torres 90'	Report	Montoya 71'; Alipio 86'	Stadium: Estadio Primero de Mayo; Attendance: 100

22 November 2014	Mineros de Fresnillo	1–1 (3–2 agg.)	Topos de Reynosa	Fresnillo
19:00	Del Río 59'	Report	Chávez 66'	Stadium: Unidad Deportiva Minera Fresnillo; Attendance: 500

23 November 2014	Selva Cañera	3–1 (3–2 agg.)	C.U. del Fútbol	Zacatepec
15:00	Velázquez 18'; Hernández 25'; Moreno 30'		Aguilera 11'	Stadium: Estadio Agustín Coruco Díaz; Attendance: 4,500

==== Semi-finals ====
Team 1	Agg.	Team 2	1st leg	2nd leg
Selva Cañera	2–1	Garzas UAEH	1–0	1–1
Atlético San Luis	5–6	Mineros de Fresnillo	0–3	5–3

===== First leg =====
26 November 2014	Mineros de Fresnillo	3–0	Atlético San Luis	Fresnillo
19:00	Blanco 57', 87'; Ruíz 74'	Report		Stadium: Unidad Deportiva Minera Fresnillo; Attendance: 700

27 November 2014	Garzas UAEH	0–1	Selva Cañera	Pachuca
15:30		Report	Moreno 41'	Stadium: Estadio Revolución Mexicana; Attendance: 200

===== Second leg =====
29 November 2014	Atlético San Luis	5–3 (5–6 agg.)	Mineros de Fresnillo	San Luis Potosí
12:00	Cinco 3'; Covarrubias 14' (o.g.); Hernández 18'; Guerrero 25', 71'	Report	Muro 34', 90'; Morales 61'	Stadium: Estadio Alfonso Lastras; Attendance: 500

30 November 2014	Selva Cañera	1–1 (2–1 agg.)	Garzas UAEH	Zacatepec
15:00	Velázquez 25'	Report	Zendejas 5'	Stadium: Estadio Agustín Coruco Díaz; Attendance: 5,000

==== Final ====
Team 1	Agg.	Team 2	1st leg	2nd leg
Selva Cañera	0–7	Mineros de Fresnillo	0–5	0–2

===== First leg =====
4 December 2014	Mineros de Fresnillo	5–0	Selva Cañera	Fresnillo
19:00	González 4', 14'; Del Río 71'; Muro 76'; Cabello 82'	Report		Stadium: Unidad Deportiva Minera Fresnillo; Attendance: 3,000

===== Second leg =====
7 December 2014	Selva Cañera	0–2 (0–7 agg.)	Mineros de Fresnillo	Zacatepec
15:00		Report	Ruíz 76'; Del Río 89'	Stadium: Estadio Agustín Coruco Díaz; Attendance: 5,000

Apertura 2014 winners:

1st title

=== Cup tournament (Torneo Apertura) ===
Quarter-finals
1	Alto Rendimiento Tuzo	1	2	3
8	Lobos Prepa	1	0	1
2	Académicos	2	2	4
7	Necaxa "B"	4	1	5
3	América Coapa	0	1	1
6	Cachorros UANL	1	0	1
4	Pumas Naucalpan	1	1	2
5	Chivas Rayadas	2	2	4

Semi-finals
1	Alto Rendimiento Tuzo	1	1	2
7	Necaxa "B"	1	1	2
3	América Coapa	1	1	2
5	Chivas Rayadas	1	0	1

Final
1	Alto Rendimiento Tuzo	2	0	2 (2)
3	América Coapa (pen.)	2	0	2 (3)

Apertura 2014 winners:

1st title

== Torneo Clausura ==
=== Group 1 ===
==== Standings ====
Pos	Team	Pld	W	D	L	GF	GA	GD	Pts	Qualification
1	Alto Rendimiento Tuzo	13	8	3	2	31	13	+18	29	Advance to Liguilla de Copa
2	América Coapa	13	8	1	4	23	10	+13	28	Advance to Liguilla de Copa
3	Lobos Prepa	13	8	1	4	29	21	+8	27	Advance to Liguilla de Copa
4	Selva Cañera	13	7	3	3	31	18	+13	25	Advance to Liguilla de Liga
5	Patriotas de Córdoba	13	7	3	3	13	16	−3	24	Advance to Liguilla de Liga
6	Cuautla	13	6	4	3	19	12	+7	23	Advance to Liguilla de Liga
7	Cañoneros de Campeche	13	6	3	4	17	17	0	21	Advance to Liguilla de Liga
8	Deportivo Chimalhuacán	13	3	6	4	19	18	+1	18	Advance to Liguilla de Copa
9	Pumas Naucalpan	13	3	5	5	19	21	−2	16	
10	Garzas UAEH	13	4	0	9	18	23	−5	13	
11	Zorros UMSNH	13	3	3	7	16	24	−8	13	
12	Alebrijes "B"	13	2	5	6	13	31	−18	12	
13	Zitácuaro	13	3	2	8	15	27	−12	11	
14	Centro Universitario del Futbol	13	2	3	8	14	26	−12	10	

Source: SoccerWay

==== Results ====
Home \ Away	ALB	ART	AME	CAN	CUF	CUA	DCH	LOB	PTC	PUM	SVC	UAH	UMS	ZIT
Alebrijes			0–3		2–2		0–0		1–1	1–3	2–2			4–2
AR Tuzo	5–0				1–1		2–1		3–0	3–4	1–1			6–1
América Coapa		0–1		1–2	1–0	0–0		3–1				3–2	4–0	
Cañoneros	1–1	1–0			1–0	1–1		2–1				3–0	2–1	
CU Fútbol						0–2	0–4			2–2		2–0	2–0	1–2
Cuautla	5–1	1–1							0–1	1–0	2–0			3–2
Dep. Chimalhuacán			1–3	2–2		3–3		2–4				2–0	2–2	
Lobos Prepa	2–0	0–2			4–2	2–0					4–3	4–2	2–3	
Patriotas			1–0	1–0	1–0		0–0	0–0		3–2				3–2
Pumas Naucalpan			0–3	4–1			1–1	1–2				0–2	1–1	
Selva Cañera			1–2	3–1	6–2		1–0		3–0	1–1				3–0
Garzas UAEH	5–0	1–2				1–0			1–2		2–3			2–1
Zorros UMSNH	0–1	2–4				0–1			4–0		1–4	1–0		
Zitácuaro			1–0	2–0			0–1	1–3		0–0			1–1	

Updated to match(es) played on 11 April 2015. Source: SoccerWay
Legend: Blue = home team win; Yellow = draw; Red = away team win.

=== Group 2 ===
==== Standings ====
Pos	Team	Pld	W	D	L	GF	GA	GD	Pts	Qualification
1	Atlético San Luis "B"	13	8	5	0	23	7	+16	31	Advance to Liguilla de Liga
2	Cachorros UANL	13	6	5	2	19	10	+9	26	Advance to Liguilla de Copa
3	La Piedad	12	7	3	2	15	10	+5	24	Advance to Liguilla de Liga
4	Sahuayo	13	7	2	4	15	13	+2	24	Advance to Liguilla de Liga
5	Real Zamora	13	5	7	1	19	11	+8	23	Advance to Liguilla de Liga
6	Chivas Rayadas	13	6	4	3	17	14	+3	22	Advance to Liguilla de Copa
7	Necaxa "B"	13	5	4	4	18	15	+3	20	Advance to Liguilla de Copa
8	Mineros de Fresnillo	13	4	4	5	21	20	+1	18	Advance to Liguilla de Copa
9	Calor	13	4	2	7	18	24	−6	14	
10	U.A. Tamaulipas	13	3	4	6	13	22	−9	13	
11	Académicos	13	2	6	5	10	13	−3	12	
12	Deportivo San Juan	13	3	2	8	15	26	−11	12	
13	Celaya "B"	13	3	2	8	15	20	−5	11	
14	Topos de Reynosa	13	1	4	8	11	24	−13	8	

Source: SoccerWay

==== Results ====
Home \ Away	ACD	ASL	CAC	CAL	CEL	CHR	DSJ	LAP	MFR	NEC	RZA	SHY	TPR	UAT
Académicos		0–1		3–1			0–0		1–1	1–2	1–1			1–2
At. San Luis			2–2	2–0	4–2	2–0		3–0					2–0	
Cachorros UANL	0–1					2–2	5–0			1–0	1–1	2–0		
Calor			1–1		2–1	3–2		0–1				0–1	3–1	5–2
Celaya	2–0		0–1			1–2					0–1	0–1	3–0	1–1
Chivas Rayadas	0–0						1–0		3–1	2–1	1–1	0–1		
Dep. San Juan		1–3		3–1	1–2			0–1	2–1				2–1	
La Piedad	2–1		0–1		1–0	1–1						2–0	2–0	2–0
Mineros Fresnillo		1–3	2–0	4–1	3–3			3–2					1–1	
Necaxa		0–0		1–1	3–0		2–1	1–1	2–1					1–1
Real Zamora		0–0		2–0			2–2	0–0	0–2	3–1				3–0
Sahuayo	0–0	1–1					3–0		2–1	1–3	1–3			
Topos	1–1		1–1			1–2				2–1	2–2	0–2		1–2
UA Tamaulipas		0–0	0–2			0–1	4–3		0–0			1–2		

Updated to match(es) played on 11 April 2015. Source: SoccerWay
Legend: Blue = home team win; Yellow = draw; Red = away team win.

=== Regular-season statistics ===
==== Top goalscorers ====
Players sorted first by goals scored, then by last name.

Rank	Player	Club	Goals
1	(Mexico) Luis Arellano	Lobos Prepa	11
2	(Mexico) Arelibetsiel Hernández	Atlético San Luis	10
3	(Mexico) Carlos Garín	Selva Cañera	9
3	(Mexico) Jorge Luis Pastrana	Selva Cañera	9
5	(Mexico) Ricardo Álvarez Arce	Alto Rendimiento Tuzo	7
5	(Mexico) David Martínez	Pumas Naucalpan	7
7	(Mexico) Juan Blanco	Mineros de Fresnillo	6
7	(Mexico) Rubén Cortés Campos	Alto Rendimiento Tuzo	6
7	(Mexico) Rafael Jurado	Cuautla	6

Source: Liga Premier

=== Liguilla ===
==== Liguilla de Liga ====
The four best teams of each group play two games against each other on a home-and-away basis. The higher seeded teams play on their home field during the second leg. The winner of each match up is determined by aggregate score. In the quarterfinals and semifinals, if the two teams are tied on aggregate the higher seeded team advances. In the final, if the two teams are tied after both legs, the match goes to extra time and, if necessary, a penalty shoot-out.

Quarter-finals
1	Atlético San Luis	0	5	5
8	Cañoneros	0	0	0
3	La Piedad	1	0	1
6	Real Zamora	2	1	3
2	Selva Cañera (*)	2	2	4
7	Cuautla	1	3	4
4	Sahuayo (*)	1	0	1
5	Patriotas	1	0	1

Semi-finals
1	Atlético San Luis	1	3	4
6	Real Zamora	1	2	3
2	Selva Cañera	0	1	1
4	Sahuayo	3	0	3

Final
1	Atlético San Luis	0	1	1 (3)
4	Sahuayo (pen.)	0	1	1 (4)

(*) The team was classified by its position in the season table

==== Quarter-finals ====
Team 1	Agg.	Team 2	1st leg	2nd leg
Atlético San Luis	5–0	Cañoneros	0–0	5–0
La Piedad	1–3	Real Zamora	1–2	0–1
Selva Cañera	4–4	Cuautla	2–1	2–3
Sahuayo	1–1	Patriotas	1–1	0–0

===== First leg =====
15 April 2015	Cuautla	1–2	Selva Cañera	Cuautla
16:00	Jurado 70'	Report	Garín 16'; Hernández 81'	Stadium: Estadio Isidro Gil Tapia; Attendance: 3,000

15 April 2015	Patriotas	1–1	Sahuayo	Boca del Río
16:00	Cabrera 45'	Report	Valle 21'	Stadium: Universidad Cristóbal Colón Calasanz; Attendance: 100

16 April 2015	Cañoneros	0–0	Atlético San Luis	Campeche
16:00		Report		Stadium: Estadio Universitario Campeche; Attendance: 300

16 April 2015	Real Zamora	2–1	La Piedad	Zamora
20:00	Zarate 62'; Espinoza 79'	Report	Cervantes 49'	Stadium: Unidad Deportiva El Chamizal; Attendance: 4,500

===== Second leg =====
18 April 2015	Selva Cañera	2–3 (4–4 agg.)	Cuautla	Zacatepec
17:00	Ricardo Jurado 35', 54'	Report	Rafael Jurado 7', 90'; Meza 84'	Stadium: Estadio Agustín Coruco Díaz; Attendance: 2,000

18 April 2015	Sahuayo	0–0 (1–1 agg.)	Patriotas	Sahuayo
17:00		Report		Stadium: Unidad Deportiva Municipal; Attendance: 1,000

19 April 2015	Atlético San Luis	5–0 (5–0 agg.)	Cañoneros	San Luis Potosí
16:00	Hernández 6', 27'; Cinco 10'; Franco 28'; Meléndez 83'	Report		Stadium: Estadio Alfonso Lastras; Attendance: 200

19 April 2015	La Piedad	0–1 (1–3 agg.)	Real Zamora	La Piedad
16:00		Report	Rosas 77'	Stadium: Estadio Juan N. López; Attendance: 5,000

==== Semi-finals ====
Team 1	Agg.	Team 2	1st leg	2nd leg
Atlético San Luis	4–3	Real Zamora	1–1	3–2
Selva Cañera	1–3	Sahuayo	0–3	1–0

===== First leg =====
23 April 2015	Sahuayo	3–0	Selva Cañera	Sahuayo
17:00	Chavarría 6'; Piñón 27', 57'	Report		Stadium: Unidad Deportiva Municipa1; Attendance: 1,000

23 April 2015	Real Zamora	1–1	Atlético San Luis	Zamora
20:00	Espinoza 87'	Report	Hernández 28'	Stadium: Unidad Deportiva El Chamizal; Attendance: 4,500

===== Second leg =====
26 April 2015	Atlético San Luis	3–2 (4–3 agg.)	Real Zamora	San Luis Potosí
12:00	Guerrero 31', 54'; Lozano 43'	Report	Rosas 25'; Espinoza 45'	Stadium: Estadio Alfonso Lastras; Attendance: 600

26 April 2015	Selva Cañera	1–0 (1–3 agg.)	Sahuayo	Zacatepec
17:00	Pastrana 20'	Report		Stadium: Estadio Agustín Coruco Díaz; Attendance: 2,000

==== Final ====
Team 1	Agg.	Team 2	1st leg	2nd leg
Atlético San Luis	1–1	Sahuayo (pen.)	0–0	1–1

===== First leg =====
30 April 2015	Sahuayo	0–0	Atlético San Luis	Sahuayo
17:00		Report		Stadium: Unidad Deportiva Municipal; Attendance: 1,000

===== Second leg =====
3 May 2015	Atlético San Luis	1–1 (1–1 agg.) (3–4 p)	Sahuayo	San Luis Potosí
12:00	Cinco 83'	Report	Piñón 50'	Stadium: Estadio Alfonso Lastras; Attendance: 3,000

Clausura 2015 winners:

1st title

=== Cup tournament (Torneo Clausura) ===
Quarter-finals
1	América Coapa	1	2	3
8	Mineros de Fresnillo	0	1	1
4	Lobos Prepa	2	1	3
5	Necaxa	1	1	2
2	Alto Rendimiento Tuzo	4	5	8
7	Deportivo Chimalhuacán	3	1	4
3	Cachorros UANL	1	3	4
6	Chivas Rayadas	1	0	1

Semi-finals
1	América Coapa	2	2	4
4	Lobos Prepa	0	1	1
2	Alto Rendimiento Tuzo	1	2	3
3	Cachorros UANL	0	2	2

Final
1	América Coapa	4	1	5
2	Alto Rendimiento Tuzo	1	1	2

== Relegation Table ==
P	Team	Pts	G	Pts/G
1	América Coapa	55	25	2.20
2	Selva Cañera	54	25	2.16
3	Atlético San Luis	53	25	2.12
4	Alto Rendimiento Tuzo	53	25	2.12
5	Cachorros UANL	46	25	1.84
6	Chivas Rayadas	45	25	1.80
7	Lobos Prepa	42	25	1.68
8	Pumas Naucalpan	42	25	1.68
9	Sahuayo	42	25	1.68
10	Mineros de Fresnillo	40	25	1.60
11	Real Zamora	40	25	1.60
12	La Piedad	39	25	1.56
13	Patriotas de Córdoba	38	25	1.52
14	Académicos de Atlas	38	25	1.52
15	Cuautla	37	25	1.48
16	Necaxa	37	25	1.48
17	Zorros UMSNH	34	25	1.36
18	Garzas UAEH	34	25	1.36
19	Deportivo Chimalhuacán	34	25	1.36
20	Cañoneros de Campeche	29	25	1.16
21	U.A. Tamaulipas	29	25	1.16
22	Celaya	29	25	1.16
23	Calor	28	25	1.12
24	Topos de Reynosa	27	25	1.08
25	Centro Universitario del Fútbol	26	25	1.04
26	Alebrijes	21	25	0.84
27	Deportivo San Juan	16	25	0.64
28	Zitácuaro	16	25	0.64

Last updated: 12 April 2015
Source: Liga Premier FMF
P = Position; G = Games played; Pts = Points; Pts/G = Ratio of points to games played

Due to changes in the number of participants in the league, the relegation was canceled this season.

== Promotion Final ==
The Promotion Final is a series of matches played by the champions of the tournaments Apertura and Clausura, the game was played to determine the winning team of the promotion to Liga Premier de Ascenso. The first leg was played on 7 May 2015, and the second leg was played on 10 May 2015.

Team 1	Agg.	Team 2	1st leg	2nd leg
Sahuayo	3–3	Mineros de Fresnillo (pen.)	0–1	3–2

=== First leg ===
7 May 2015	Mineros de Fresnillo	1–0	Sahuayo	Fresnillo
19:00	Devora 33'	Report		Stadium: Unidad Deportiva Minera Fresnillo; Attendance: 3,000

=== Second leg ===
10 May 2015	Sahuayo	3–2 (3–3 agg.) (3–4 p)	Mineros de Fresnillo	Sahuayo
12:00	Benitez 73'; Gil 84'; Piñón 104'	Report	Ruíz 25'; Del Río 119'	Stadium: Unidad Deportiva Municipal; Attendance: 2,000

2015-16 season winners:

1st title

== See also ==
- 2014–15 Liga MX season
- 2014–15 Ascenso MX season
- 2014–15 Liga Premier de Ascenso season
