= Estadio José López Portillo =

Stadium in Chetumal, Mexico

Coordinates: 18°30′11.042″N 88°20′10.197″W

- Jolopo
- Interactive map of Estadio José López Portillo
- Full name: Estadio José López Portillo
- Location: Chetumal, Quintana Roo
- Owner: Government of Quintana Roo
- Capacity: 6,600

Construction
- Opened: 13 March 1980

Tenants
- Chicleros de Chetumal (1985–92); Potros Chetumal (2008–09); Yalmakán (2018–2022, 2023–present); Deportivo Chetumal (2021–present)

Estadio José López Portillo is a stadium in Chetumal, Quintana Roo, Mexico. It is primarily used for soccer, and is the home field of Yalmakán F.C. and Deportivo Chetumal. It holds 6,600 people.

The stadium was opened on March 13, 1980, however, until 1982 it began to host official matches. Between 2008 and 2009 it was the field of the Potros Chetumal, a reserve team of Atlante F.C. who played in the Primera División 'A'.

In 2018 the stadium underwent a remodeling so that it could host matches of the Liga Premier de México, the third level of Mexican football, because from that year on it became the stadium of the Yalmakán F.C., a team that competes in that league. The renovation was carried out ahead of Yalmakán F.C.'s move to Chetumal for the 2018–19 season, allowing the club to use the stadium as its home ground. The project was intended to improve the facility's condition and provide a suitable venue for professional football matches in the state of Quintana Roo.
