= Diego Crosa (footballer, born 2002) =

Mexican footballer

Personal information
- Full name: Diego Antonio Crosa Cuevas
- Date of birth: 21 October 2002 (age 24)
- Place of birth: Veracruz, Mexico
- Height: 1.68 m (5 ft 6 in)
- Position: Midfielder

Team information
- Current team: Puebla
- Number: 202

Youth career
- –2019: Veracruz

Senior career*
Years	Team	Apps	(Gls)
2020–	Puebla	0	(0)
2020	→ Tlaxcala (loan)	6	(0)
- * Club domestic league appearances and goals as of 17 May 2021

Diego Antonio Crosa Cuevas (born 21 October 2002) is a Mexican professional footballer who plays as a midfielder for Puebla.

== Career statistics ==
=== Club ===
As of 17 May 2021.

Club	Season	League			Cup		Continental		Other		Total	
Club	Season	Division	Apps	Goals	Apps	Goals	Apps	Goals	Apps	Goals	Apps	Goals
Puebla	2020–21	Liga MX	–		–		–		–		0	0
Tlaxcala (loan)	2020–21	Liga de Expansión MX	6	0	–		–		–		6	0
Career total			6	0	0	0	0	0	0	0	6	0
