= 1987–88 Mexican Segunda División season =

Segunda División de México
- Season: 1987–88
- Champions: Cobras (2nd Title)
- Promoted: SUOO; Águila Progreso Industrial
- Relegated: Oaxaca; Texcoco; Águila Progreso Industrial
- Matches played: 435
- Goals scored: 1,221 (2.81 per match)
- Top goalscorer: Salvador Ochoa (23 goals)

The 1987–88 Segunda División was the 39th season of the Mexican Segunda División. The season started on 14 August 1987 and concluded on 12 July 1988. It was won by Cobras.

== Changes ==
- UAT was promoted to Primera División.
- Cobras and León were relegated from Primera División. Before the start of the season Cobras was relocated in Ciudad Juárez.
- SUOO was promoted from Segunda División B. Cachorros Neza won the second promotion place, however, the team board sold its franchise to Petroleros de Salina Cruz.
- Águila Progreso Industrial was promoted from Tercera División.
- Zacatecas, Pachuca and Nuevo Necaxa were relegated from Segunda División.
- U. de C. sold its license to Alacranes Rojos de Apatzingán.
- Progreso de Cocula exchanged its franchise with FEG, team of the Federación de Estudiantes de Guadalajara, a student union of the University of Guadalajara, for this reason the student team took its place in the league, while Progreso was relegated to Tercera División. FEG was affiliated with U. de G.
- Tapatío returned to Guadalajara after one season in Aguascalientes City.

== Teams ==
1987–88 season Teams

Club	City	Stadium
Águila Progreso Industrial	Ciudad Nicolás Romero	Estadio Progreso Industrial
Apatzingán	Apatzingán	Unidad Deportiva Adolfo López Mateos
Chetumal	Chetumal	Estadio José López Portillo
Cobras	Ciudad Juárez	Estadio Olímpico Benito Juárez
FEG	Guadalajara	Estadio Tecnológico UdeG
Jalisco	Guadalajara	Estadio Jalisco
La Piedad	La Piedad	Estadio Juan N. López
León	León	Estadio Nou Camp
Oaxaca	Oaxaca City	Estadio Gral. Manuel Cabrera Carrasquedo; Estadio Benito Juárez
Orizaba	Orizaba	Estadio Moctezuma
Petroleros de Salina Cruz	Salina Cruz	Estadio Heriberto Kehoe Vincent
Pioneros Cancún	Cancún	Estadio Cancún 86
Santos Laguna	Torreón	Estadio Corona
SUOO	Cuautitlán	Estadio Los Pinos
Tapatío	Guadalajara	Estadio Anacleto Macías
Tecomán	Tecomán	Estadio IAETAC
Tepic	Tepic	Estadio Nicolás Álvarez Ortega
Texcoco	Texcoco	Estadio Municipal de Texcoco
UAQ	Querétaro City	Estadio Corregidora
Zacatepec	Zacatepec	Estadio Agustín "Coruco" Díaz

== Group stage ==
=== Group 1 ===
Pos	Team	Pld	W	D	L	GF	GA	GD	Pts	Qualification or relegation
1	Santos Laguna (Q)	38	19	8	11	68	42	+26	61	Qualified to Playoffs
2	Apatzingán (Q)	38	14	8	16	58	48	+10	48	Qualified to Playoffs
3	SUOO	38	10	19	9	55	48	+7	47	
4	FEG	38	10	14	14	45	52	−7	41	Relegation Group
5	Texcoco	38	9	15	14	37	44	−7	39	Relegation Group

Source: RSSSF
(Q) Qualified for the phase indicated

=== Group 2 ===
Pos	Team	Pld	W	D	L	GF	GA	GD	Pts	Qualification or relegation
1	Tecomán (Q)	38	15	12	11	63	58	+5	53	Qualified to Playoffs
2	Orizaba (Q)	38	15	10	13	46	49	−3	51	Qualified to Playoffs
3	Chetumal	38	11	14	13	56	60	−4	44	
4	Petroleros Salina Cruz	38	9	15	14	43	62	−19	39	Relegation Group
5	Oaxaca (R)	38	8	8	22	47	79	−32	29	Relegated

Source: RSSSF
(Q) Qualified for the phase indicated; (R) Relegated

=== Group 3 ===
Pos	Team	Pld	W	D	L	GF	GA	GD	Pts	Qualification or relegation
1	Tapatío (Q)	38	16	7	15	51	57	−6	51	Qualified to Playoffs
2	UAQ (Q)	38	14	11	13	67	63	+4	49	Qualified to Playoffs
3	Jalisco	38	11	18	9	53	42	+11	48	Qualified to Playoffs
4	Tepic	38	15	5	18	57	63	−6	45	
5	Águila Progreso Industrial	38	9	14	15	50	75	−25	39	Relegation Group

Source: RSSSF
(Q) Qualified for the phase indicated

=== Group 4 ===
Pos	Team	Pld	W	D	L	GF	GA	GD	Pts	Qualification or relegation
1	León (Q)	38	21	9	8	82	46	+36	67	Qualified to Playoffs
2	Cobras (Q)	38	16	12	10	48	42	+6	54	Qualified to Playoffs
3	Pioneros Cancún (Q)	38	16	11	11	57	44	+13	53	Qualified to Playoffs
4	La Piedad	38	18	3	17	48	52	−4	50	
5	Zacatepec	38	13	9	16	44	49	−5	44	

Source: RSSSF
(Q) Qualified for the phase indicated

== Results ==
Home \ Away	API	APT	CHE	COB	FEG	JAL	LPD	LEO	OAX	ORI	PET	PIO	SAN	SUO	TAP	TEC	TEP	TEX	UAQ	ZAC
Águila PI	—	1–1	0–1	2–0	2–2	3–3	3–2	1–1	3–3	0–0	2–0	3–2	1–2	2–2	0–2	2–2	0–2	0–0	4–0	2–2
Apatzingán	3–0	—	1–1	1–2	3–1	1–0	2–3	2–0	3–0	7–0	4–0	0–1	1–1	2–0	2–1	2–2	0–1	2–0	3–0	2–0
Chetumal	2–2	2–0	—	1–0	1–2	2–0	5–0	3–3	3–2	3–0	1–1	3–1	3–1	1–1	1–1	2–2	3–4	3–0	2–1	1–1
Cobras	4–1	2–0	1–1	—	1–0	2–1	2–1	2–2	2–0	2–1	1–1	2–1	3–1	0–0	2–0	3–0	2–0	1–1	0–0	1–0
FEG	1–1	1–1	2–2	4–0	—	0–1	1–0	2–2	2–0	1–1	2–0	1–1	1–1	2–2	2–3	2–2	0–1	1–0	2–0	1–0
Jalisco	1–3	1–0	0–0	3–3	2–0	—	2–0	3–1	2–1	0–0	0–0	1–1	2–2	1–1	6–0	1–1	1–0	2–2	1–1	5–0
La Piedad	3–0	2–0	3–1	2–1	2–0	1–1	—	3–1	1–0	3–0	1–0	1–1	1–0	1–0	3–1	1–3	1–0	1–2	2–0	1–0
León	7–0	2–0	5–2	1–0	4–0	3–1	2–0	—	4–1	3–1	6–1	1–0	5–1	1–1	3–1	1–0	1–0	1–0	2–0	0–1
Oaxaca	1–2	1–1	2–0	1–2	3–0	1–1	1–0	0–4	—	1–1	1–1	1–3	0–1	4–1	0–0	3–1	3–2	1–0	3–1	1–3
Orizaba	2–0	0–2	0–0	1–0	1–1	1–1	2–0	1–2	2–0	—	2–0	1–0	2–0	4–1	1–1	5–0	3–0	1–0	0–2	1–0
Petroleros SC	2–2	2–0	2–1	1–1	4–2	0–1	1–1	5–1	1–1	1–1	—	2–0	1–0	0–0	0–1	1–1	5–2	1–0	0–2	1–1
Pioneros Cancún	2–0	2–2	1–1	0–0	2–1	1–0	2–0	1–0	5–2	2–0	2–2	—	2–1	0–0	3–0	4–1	3–0	2–1	4–3	4–0
Santos Laguna	3–0	2–1	3–0	2–0	1–1	1–1	1–0	1–1	5–0	2–0	3–0	4–0	—	4–0	4–0	1–2	3–1	2–2	2–0	4–2
SUOO	3–1	5–1	1–0	0–0	1–1	0–0	0–1	1–2	5–3	1–2	5–0	1–1	3–0	—	1–0	5–3	3–0	0–0	2–2	3–0
Tapatío	6–0	2–1	2–1	1–0	1–3	1–2	1–3	1–1	3–0	3–1	2–3	2–0	1–0	1–1	—	3–1	0–1	1–1	0–0	3–1
Tecomán	3–3	0–0	1–1	1–1	3–0	2–1	4–0	3–1	4–2	3–0	0–0	2–1	0–2	4–1	4–1	—	2–1	0–1	3–0	2–1
Tepic	0–2	0–4	6–1	5–1	1–0	2–2	3–1	4–4	5–2	2–1	2–1	1–0	1–2	0–0	0–1	0–0	—	3–0	3–2	1–2
Texcoco	0–1	2–0	2–0	0–0	0–2	2–1	2–1	0–2	1–0	1–2	3–1	2–2	1–1	2–2	0–1	3–0	2–2	—	1–1	0–0
UAQ	3–1	6–3	2–1	3–1	2–1	1–1	6–2	3–2	1–1	4–4	7–2	0–0	2–4	1–1	1–2	2–0	1–0	2–2	—	2–0
Zacatepec	2–0	2–0	4–0	2–3	0–0	2–1	1–0	0–0	3–1	0–1	0–0	2–0	1–0	1–1	4–1	0–1	4–1	1–1	1–3	—

Source: RSSSF
Legend: Blue = home team win; Yellow = draw; Red = away team win.

== Final stage ==
=== Group 1 ===
Pos	Team	Pld	W	D	L	GF	GA	GD	Pts	Promotion	COB	TAP	SAN	ORI	PIO
1	Cobras (Q)	8	5	2	1	14	7	+7	15	Qualified to Promotion playoff		1–1	1–0	1–0	2–0
2	Tapatío	8	5	2	1	14	10	+4	15		1–4		1–0	2–0	3–2
3	Santos Laguna	8	3	3	2	9	5	+4	12		2–0	1–1		1–1	2–0
4	Orizaba	8	1	2	5	10	16	−6	5		2–2	2–3	1–3		3–1
5	Pioneros Cancún	8	1	1	6	7	16	−9	4		1–3	0–2	0–0	3–1	

Source: RSSSF
Rules for classification: 1st points; 2nd head-to-head points; 3rd head-to-head goal difference; 4th head-to-head goals scored; 5th goal difference; 6th number of goals scored
(Q) Qualified for the phase indicated

=== Group 2 ===
Pos	Team	Pld	W	D	L	GF	GA	GD	Pts	Promotion	LEO	TEC	APT	JAL	UAQ
1	León (Q)	8	5	2	1	20	7	+13	16	Qualified to Promotion playoff		4–0	5–1	2–1	3–0
2	Tecomán	8	2	4	2	14	15	−1	10		1–1		2–2	1–2	4–1
3	Apatzingán	8	2	3	3	10	12	−2	9		2–0	1–2		2–0	0–1
4	Jalisco	8	2	3	3	7	11	−4	9		0–3	1–1	1–1		0–0
5	UAQ	8	1	4	3	9	15	−6	7		2–2	3–3	1–1	1–2	

Source: RSSSF
Rules for classification: 1st points; 2nd head-to-head points; 3rd head-to-head goal difference; 4th head-to-head goals scored; 5th goal difference; 6th number of goals scored
(Q) Qualified for the phase indicated

=== Final ===
July 2, 1988	Cobras	0–0	León	Ciudad Juárez
		Report		Stadium: Estadio Olímpico Benito Juárez

July 9, 1988	León	1–1	Cobras	León
	Joel Ruíz 28'	Report	Raymundo Rodríguez 87'	Stadium: Estadio Nou Camp

July 12, 1988	León	0–1	Cobras	Mexico City
		Report	Juan Lino 20' (own)	Stadium: Estadio Azteca

== Relegation Group ==
Pos	Team	Pld	W	D	L	GF	GA	GD	Pts	Promotion	PET	FEG	TEX	API
1	Petroleros Salina Cruz	6	5	1	0	14	4	+10	15			2–0	1–0	5–1
2	FEG	6	2	2	2	6	6	0	7		2–2		1–0	3–0
3	Texcoco (R)	6	1	2	3	3	5	−2	5	Relegated	0–1	0–0		1–1
4	Águila Progreso Industrial (R)	6	1	1	4	6	14	−8	4	Relegated	1–3	2–0	1–2	

Source: RSSSF
Rules for classification: 1st points; 2nd head-to-head points; 3rd head-to-head goal difference; 4th head-to-head goals scored; 5th goal difference; 6th number of goals scored
(R) Relegated
