= Héctor Medrano =

Mexican footballer and manager (born 1967)

Personal information
- Full name: Héctor Medrano Abad
- Date of birth: 29 March 1967 (age 59)
- Place of birth: Uruapan, Michoacán, Mexico
- Height: 1.70 m (5 ft 7 in)
- Position: Defender

Team information
- Current team: Diablos Tesistán (manager)

Senior career*
Years	Team	Apps	(Gls)
1987–1988	UAT		
1988–1992	Atlas		
1993-1994	Puebla		
1994–1995	UAT		
1995–1996	Toluca		
1996–1997	Atlético Celaya		
1999–2000	Atlético San Francisco		

Managerial career
- 2007: Atlético Cuauhtémoc
- 2008–2009: Querétaro
- 2010–2011: U. de G.
- 2012: Atlas (Assistant)
- 2013: Irapuato
- 2013–2014: BUAP
- 2014: Mérida (Assistant)
- 2016: Sonora
- 2016: Titanes de Saltillo
- 2017–2019: U. de C. (Assistant)
- 2021–2022: Tecos
- 2022: Zapopan
- 2025–: Diablos Tesistán
- * Club domestic league appearances and goals

Héctor Medrano Abad (born March 29, 1967) is a Mexican football manager and former player.

== Career ==
Medrano was born in Uruapan, Michoacán. He played for Correcaminos UAT, Atlas, Puebla F.C., Deportivo Toluca and Club Celaya.

He managed Querétaro to return to Primera División de México in a two-leg aggregate to try to earn promotion to Primera División after defeating Mérida F.C. in penalty series 5–4. He continued to lead the club in the Primera during the Apertura 2009 tournament.

== Honours ==
- Primera División A: Apertura 2008
- Primera División A Campeón de Ascenso: 2008–09
