= Chiautempan Municipality =

Coordinates: 19.31°N 98.19°W

Chiautempan
- Municipality
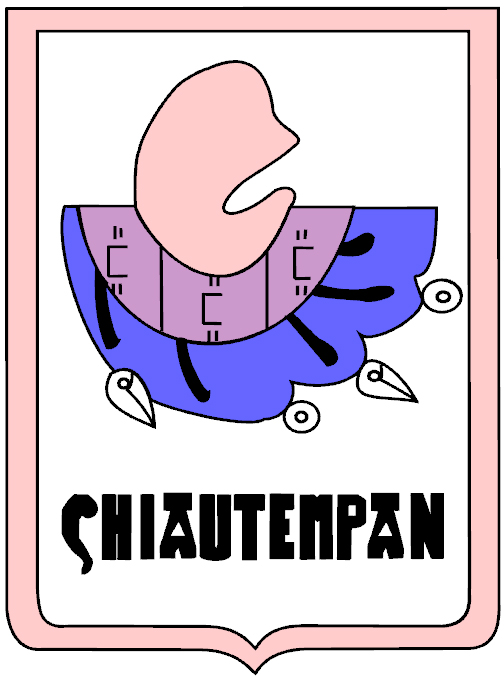
- Coat of arms

- Location in Mexico Chiautempan (Mexico)
- Country: Mexico
- State: Tlaxcala
- Demonym: (in Spanish)
- Time zone: UTC−6 (CST)

Chiautempan is one of the municipalities of the Mexican state of Tlaxcala. The municipal seat is at Santa Ana Chiautempan.

As of 2020, the location had a population of 73,125 people.
