= Mineros de Fresnillo F.C. =

Mineros de Fresnillo
- Full name: Mineros de Fresnillo Fútbol Club
- Nickname: Los Mineros (The Miners)
- Founded: 2007; 19 years ago
- Ground: Estadio Carlos Vega Villalba; Zacatecas, Zacatecas
- Capacity: 20,068
- Owner: Grupo ISLO
- Chairman: Honorio Campos
- Manager: Jorge Horta
- League: Liga Premier (Premier A)
- 2025–26: Liga Premier (Serie A); Regular phase: 7th (Group I); Final phase: Semi–finals (Reserves teams)
| Home colours | Away colours | Third colours |

Mineros de Fresnillo Fútbol Club, commonly known as Mineros, is a Mexican football club based in Fresnillo, Zacatecas. The club was founded in 2007, and currently plays in the Premier A, the intermediate branch of the Liga Premier de México, the third tier of Mexican football.

== History ==
Mineros de Fresnillo was founded in 2007. In 2013, the team was registered in the Liga de Nuevos Talentos. In the Torneo Apertura 2014, the team was the division champion.

In 2015, Mineros de Fresnillo was promoted to Liga Premier de Ascenso after defeating Sahuayo F.C. in the promotion playoff, however, the team had to stay one more season in Liga de Nuevos Talentos while modernizing their stadium to do it according to the requirements of the league.

In the 2016-17 season, the team made its debut in the Liga Premier de Ascenso, and in the Clausura 2017 tournament, Fresnillo was classified to the league for the championship, although it was eliminated in the quarterfinals by Pioneros de Cancún. Although Mineros de Fresnillo had retained its place in the Segunda División de México, before the start of the 2017-18 season the team was relegated to the Serie B for not meeting the requirements established by the new Liga Premier de México. However, it was invited back for the 2019-20 season, which was abandoned due to the Covid-19 pandemic.

In July 2021, the team became a squad team affiliated to Mineros de Zacatecas, after the Zacatecan team took over Mineros de Fresnillo because it stopped receiving financial support from the mining company.

== Players ==
=== Current squad ===
As of 9 September 2026

Note: Flags indicate national team as defined under FIFA eligibility rules; some limited exceptions apply. Players may hold more than one non-FIFA nationality.

| No. | Pos. | Nation | Player |
|---|---|---|---|
| 81 | GK | MEX | Donato Marín |
| 82 | FW | MEX | Aldo Encinas |
| 83 | MF | NCA | Juban Uriarte |
| 84 | DF | MEX | Bryan Jaramillo |
| 85 | MF | MEX | Gabriel Uribe |
| 86 | MF | MEX | Randy Ríos |
| 87 | DF | MEX | Emiliano Peñaloza |
| 89 | DF | MEX | Ángel Luna |
| 91 | DF | MEX | Jair Ramírez |
| 92 | FW | MEX | Roberto Ibarra |

| No. | Pos. | Nation | Player |
|---|---|---|---|
| 93 | FW | MEX | Juan Jongitud |
| 95 | MF | MEX | Cristian Martínez |
| 96 | MF | MEX | Coupper Flores |
| 97 | DF | MEX | Raúl Hernández |
| 98 | DF | MEX | Hugo Mata |
| 99 | MF | MEX | Iván Coronado |
| 101 | GK | MEX | Ángel Cruz |
| 102 | FW | MEX | Luca Zarazua |
| 104 | MF | MEX | Alan Sandoval |
| 109 | DF | MEX | Erick Montero |
