= Yalmakán F.C. =

Mexican football club

- Full name: Yalmakán Fútbol Club
- Nickname: Chaacmools (The Chaacmools)
- Founded: 30 August 2013; 12 years ago
- Dissolved: 8 January 2024; 2 years ago
- Ground: Estadio José López Portillo; Chetumal, Quintana Roo
- Capacity: 6,600
- Owner: Adrián Valdez Contreras
- Chairman: Adrián Valdez Contreras
- League: Liga Premier - Serie A
Home colours	Away colours

Yalmakán Fútbol Club, commonly known as Yalmakán, was a Mexican football club based in Chetumal, Quintana Roo. The club was founded in 2013, and last played in the Liga Premier - Serie A of the Segunda División de México.

== History ==
The club was founded in 2013 in Chetumal, Quintana Roo.

=== Final Apertura 2017 ===
After winning the Clausura 2017 title and the Ascenso in the Liga de Nuevos Talentos, Yalmakán was supposed to play in the Serie A, but the league still had to restructure the league to make it more efficient by every team structure based by stadium capacity, fans, etc., meaning that Yalmakán had to stay in Serie B hoping of improving their team structure in order to play in Serie A if they won promotion. This was their second straight final in hopes of making it back to back titles in franchise history facing a team that they were supposed to play against in the Ascenso MX, but Tlaxcala F.C. and the Federación Mexicana de Fútbol (FMF) denied their invite because their stadium had not yet met the requirements to do so.

=== Promotion to Serie A ===
Despite being eliminated from the quarterfinals in the Clausura 2018, Yalmakán played in the final de Ascenso against Orizaba. They won the first match in Puerto Morelos with a score of 1–0. However, they tied at Veracruz with a score of 1–1 in the second match, the team still secured promotion, though. The team was relocated from Puerto Morelos to Chetumal in order to meet requirements to play in the Serie A and on July 6, 2018, they earned a spot to play in the Serie A.

== Reserve teams ==
Deportivo Chetumal (Liga TDP)
Reserve team that plays in the Liga TDP, the fourth level of the Mexican league system.
