= Estadio Tlahuicole =

- Cueva Coyotes de Tlaxcala "Cave of Coyotes de Tlaxcala"
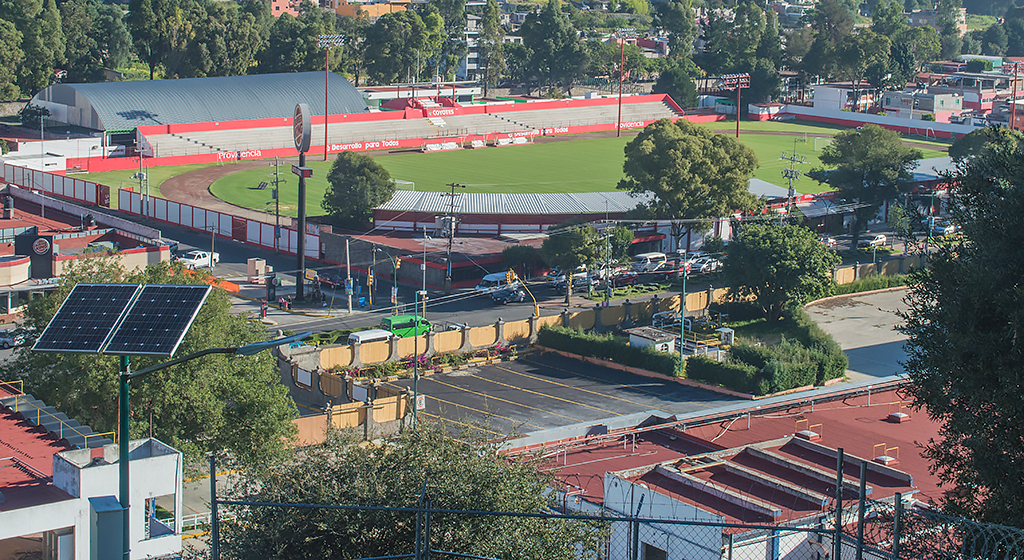
- Interactive map of Estadio Tlahuicole
- Full name: Estadio Tlahuicole
- Location: Tlaxcala City, Tlaxcala
- Coordinates: 19°19′32.5″N 98°13′49.5″W
- Owner: Government of Tlaxcala
- Operator: Tlaxcala F.C.
- Capacity: 11,135
- Surface: Grass

Construction
- Opened: 1961
- Renovated: 2019

Tenant
- Tlaxcala F.C.

The Estadio Tlahuicole is a multi-use stadium in Tlaxcala City, Tlaxcala, Mexico. It is currently used mostly for football matches and is the home stadium for Tlaxcala F.C. The stadium has a capacity of 11,135 people. In December 2017 the stadium was demolished to give way to its reconstruction, as well as the expansion of its capacity to 15,000 spectators to comply with the Ascenso MX regulations. On 6 December 2019, the first renovation stage was opened, with these works, the stadium achieved a capacity for 12,000 spectators. In October 2020, construction work began on the north and south stands to expand the capacity of the stadium to 17,000 spectators.
