= Lizandro Echeverría =

Mexican footballer (born 1991)

Personal information
- Full name: Lizandro Adrián Echeverría Pacheco
- Date of birth: 17 February 1991 (age 35)
- Place of birth: Benito Juárez, Quintana Roo, Mexico
- Height: 1.70 m (5 ft 7 in)
- Position: Forward

Youth career
- 2008–2009: Pioneros Junior
- 2010–2012: Potros de Hierro

Senior career*
Years	Team	Apps	(Gls)
2011–2012	Mérida	6	(0)
2013	Pioneros de Cancún	13	(7)
2013	Inter Playa	13	(2)
2014	Reynosa	14	(2)
2014–2015	Pioneros de Cancún	24	(8)
2015	Atlante	0	(0)
2016–2017	Pioneros de Cancún	42	(37)
2017–2020	Atlante	55	(19)
2019–2020	→ Cafetaleros (loan)	7	(2)
2021	Venados	15	(2)
2021	Oaxaca	13	(4)
- * Club domestic league appearances and goals as of 12 November 2021

Lizandro Adrián Echeverría Pacheco (born 17 February 1991) is a Mexican professional footballer who plays as a forward.

== Honours ==
Individual

- Liga de Expansión MX Golden Boot (Shared): Guardianes 2020
