= Professional football =

Professional football may refer to:

- Professionalism in association football
- Professional gridiron football
- National Football League
- Canadian Football League
- Australian Football League
