= Cuervos de Ensenada =

- Full name: Cuervos de Ensenada JAP Fútbol Club
- Nickname: Los Cuervos (The Crows)
- Founded: June 2016; 10 years ago
- Dissolved: 5 July 2017; 9 years ago
- Ground: Estadio Municipal de Ensenada, Ensenada, Baja California, Mexico
- Capacity: 7,600
| Home colours | Away colours |

Cuervos de Ensenada JAP Fútbol Club, commonly known as Cuervos de Ensenada, was a Mexican football club based in Ensenada, Baja California. The club was founded in June 2016, and played in the Liga Premier de Ascenso of the Segunda División de México until July 5, 2017 when it was relocated to Tepic, Nayarit and renamed Coras de Tepic.
