= Unidad Deportiva Minera Fresnillo =

Football stadium in Fresnillo, Zacatecas, Mexico

The Unidad Deportiva Minera Fresnillo is a multi-use stadium in Fresnillo, Zacatecas, Mexico. It is currently used mostly for football matches and is the home stadium for Mineros de Fresnillo. The stadium has a capacity of 5,000 people.
