= Titanes de Saltillo =

- Full name: Titanes de Saltillo Fútbol Club
- Nickname: Los Titanes (The Titans)
- Founded: 2015; 11 years ago
- Dissolved: 2017; 9 years ago
- Ground: Estadio Olímpico Francisco I. Madero; Saltillo, Coahuila
- Capacity: 6,000
- Chairman: Sergio Guadarrama
- League: Liga Premier - Serie A
Home colours	Away colours

Titanes de Saltillo Fútbol Club, commonly known as Titanes de Saltillo, was a Mexican football club based in Saltillo, Coahuila that competed in the Liga Premier - Serie A, the third division level of Mexican football.

== History ==
The team was founded in 2015 playing in the Tercera División de México. A year later the team got a place in the Liga Premier - Serie A by renting the franchise belonging to C.D. Uruapan, a team that could not play in that division due to problems in their stadium. Manager Héctor Medrano led Titanes through its 2016 Serie A debut.

At the end of the 2016–17 season, the team was relegated to what is now called Serie B, however, before the next season, the club changed owners, so Titanes was dissolved to make room for Atlético Saltillo Soccer.
