= Alacranes Rojos de Apatzingán =

Mexican football club

- Full name: Alacranes Rojos de Apatzingán Fútbol Club
- Nickname: Alacranes Rojos
- Founded: 1970; 55 years ago
- Dissolved: 2016; 9 years ago
- Ground: Unidad Deportiva ITO; Apatzingán, Michoacán, Mexico
- Capacity: 1,000
- League: Tercera División de México - Group III
- Apertura 2017: Preseason
Home colours	Away colours

Alacranes Rojos de Apatzingán (English: The Red Scorpions) was a Mexican soccer team located in the small city of Apatzingán, Michoacán, Mexico. The team played in the Segunda División de México, the third tier in the Mexican League System, until at least 2016, when it was moved to the city of Oaxaca, Oaxaca, changing its name to Milenarios de Oaxaca, and descended to the Tercera División de México. The team has competed in the championship finals several times, losing each time.
