= Chiautempan =

- City
- Santa Ana Chiautempan
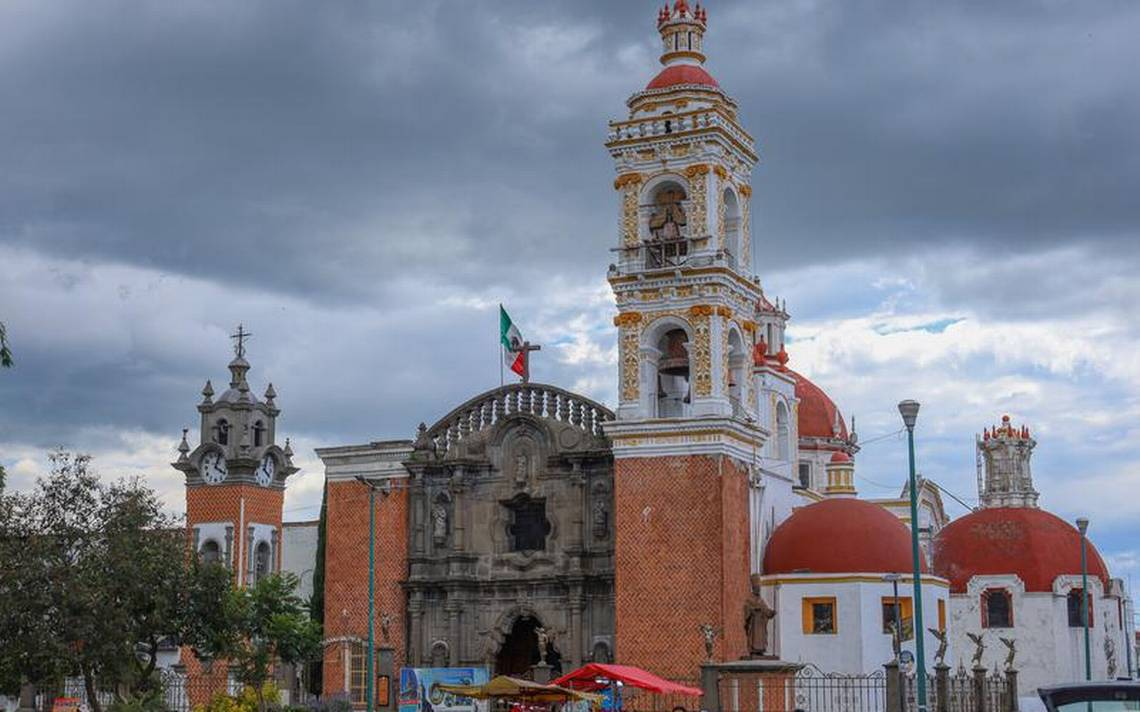
- Parroquia de Santa Ana

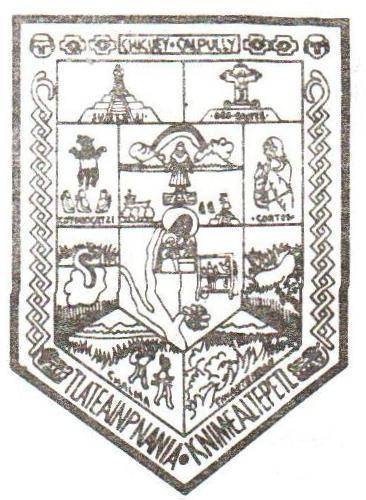
- Seal

- Location within Tlaxcala Location within Mexico
- Coordinates: 19°18′50″N 98°11′35″W
- Country: Mexico
- State: Tlaxcala
- Municipality: Chiautempan
- Founded: 1380 AD

Government
  - Presidente Municipal: Linda Marina Dolores Munive Temoltzín (2005-08)

Area (municip.)
  - Total: 66.21 km^{2} (25.56 sq mi)
- Elevation: 2,300 m (7,500 ft)

Population (2005)
  - Total: 46,776
- (municip.)
- Time zone: UTC-6 (Zona Centro)
- Postal code: 90800
- Area code: 246
- Demonym: Chiautempense
- Website: www.chiautempan.gob.mx

Santa Ana Chiautempan is a city in the south-central part of the Mexican state of Tlaxcala. The city serves as the municipal seat of the surrounding municipality of Chiautempan, which covers an area of 66.21 km^{2} (25.56 sq mi). At the 2005 census it had a population of 46,776 inhabitants, the fourth-largest community in the state in population (after Villa Vicente Guerrero, Apizaco, and Huamantla).

The city lies at the extreme western end of the municipality, which had a census population of 63,300 inhabitants. Its largest other communities are the towns of San Bartolomé Cuahuixmatlac, San Pedro Tlalcuapan de Nicolás Bravo, and San Pedro Muñoztla.

== Sister cities ==
- Nampo, North Korea
