= Dorados de Sinaloa Premier =

- Full name: Club Social y Deportivo Dorados de Sinaloa Premier
- Nickname(s): Los Dorados (The Dorados or The Mahi-Mahis); El Gran Pez (The Big Fish) El Benjamín (The Benjamin)
- Founded: 14 July 2015; 9 years ago
- Dissolved: 2020; 5 years ago
- Ground: Deportivo Juventud; Navolato, Sinaloa, Mexico
- Capacity: 2,000
- Owner: Grupo Caliente
- Chairman: José Antonio Núñez
- League: Liga Premier - Serie B
- 2019–20: 11th (Tournament abandoned)
- Website: http://www.doradosfc.com.mx
Home colours	Away colours

Club Social y Deportivo Dorados de Sinaloa Premier was a professional football team that played in the Mexican Football League. They were playing in the Liga Premier Serie B. Club Social y Deportivo Dorados de Sinaloa Premier was affiliated with Dorados de Sinaloa who plays in the Ascenso MX.
