= Tlaxcala F.C. =

Tlaxcala
- Full name: Tlaxcala Fútbol Club
- Nickname: Coyotes
- Short name: TLX
- Founded: 5 September 2014; 12 years ago
- Stadium: Estadio Tlahuicole
- Capacity: 11,135
- Owner: Medical Life
- President: Aldo Robles Caussor
- Manager: Arturo Ortega
- League: Liga de Expansión MX
- Apertura 2026: Regular phase: 8th of 16; Final phase: Quarter-finals
Home colours	Away colours

Tlaxcala Fútbol Club, also known as Coyotes de Tlaxcala, is a professional football club based in Tlaxcala. The club competes in Liga de Expansión MX, the second level of Mexican football, and plays its home matches at Estadio Tlahuicole. Founded in 2014 by the merger of Águilas Reales de Zacatecas and a reserve team of C.F. Pachuca. The club's colors are red, black and white.

Tlaxcala's debut in FMF competitions was in the Apertura 2014 tournament of the Liga Premier de Ascenso, the former main subdivision of the Segunda División. The club won automatic promotion to the Ascenso MX in the 2016–17 season, but their promotion was put on hold until the 2018–19 season as their stadium failed to meet league requirements.

== History ==
The club was founded on September 5, 2014, after the merger of the franchise of Águilas Reales de Zacatecas and the reserve team of C.F. Pachuca in the Tercera División, the Zacatecan team gave up their rights to participate in the Segunda División de México while Pachuca contributed the sports part of the organization. Previously in the Summer 2014 tournament, the city of Tlaxcala had been left without a football team due to the relocation of Linces de Tlaxcala to Acapulco, Guerrero, where the team was renamed as Internacional de Acapulco, while Águilas Reales de Zacatecas was moved to Pachuca, Hidalgo and merged with the reserve team of Pachuca, which was later moved to the city of Tlaxcala giving birth to Tlaxcala F.C., and became a secondary team due to the arrival of Mineros de Zacatecas, a team that shared the same ownership with Tlaxcala F.C. until 2020.

Tlaxcala won automatic promotion to the Ascenso MX after winning the two season tournaments against Irapuato during the 2016–17 season, but their promotion was put on hold until before the 2018–19 season as their stadium failed to meet league requirements. They played in the Serie B for the 2017–18 season so they can met requirements to play in the Ascenso MX, but their spot was revoked after the stadium was not completed at the deadline to meet the requirements, so they moved to Serie A for the 2018–19 season. In 2018–19 season, the team played as local at Unidad Deportiva Próspero Cahuantzi at Chiautempan, for the 2019–20 season, they moved to the Unidad Deportiva José Brindis in Nanacamilpa awaiting the end of the construction works of the Estadio Tlahuicole.

In July 2020, Tlaxcala F.C. was invited to the new Liga de Expansión MX, which became the second category of Mexican football instead of the Ascenso MX, with this the team occupied its place in the division after three years of having achieved sports promotion. On August 19, 2020, the club debuted in the Liga de Expansión, defeating Mineros de Zacatecas 1–2. On September 2, Tlaxcala received Celaya F.C. in its first home game, which had to be played in Nanacamilpa because the Estadio Tlahuicole was not yet ready to host professional football matches, and finally, on September 15, Tlaxcala was able to return to its stadium in the match against Leones Negros UdeG, which was won by the Guadalajara team.

== Personnel ==
=== Coaching staff ===
Position	Staff
Manager	(Mexico) Arturo Ortega
Assistant managers	(Mexico) Guillermo Gómez (Mexico) Mario López (Mexico) Rodrigo Roque
Fitness coach	(Mexico) Arturo García
Physiotherapist	(Mexico) José Rodríguez
Team doctor	(Mexico) Nery Luna

== Players ==
=== Current squad ===
As of 28 August 2026

Note: Flags indicate national team as defined under FIFA eligibility rules; some limited exceptions apply. Players may hold more than one non-FIFA nationality.

No.	Pos.	Nation	Player
1	DF	MEX	Ismael Govea
2	DF	MEX	Cristian González
3	DF	MEX	Edson Santos
4	DF	COL	Carlos Hinestroza
5	DF	MEX	Juan García Sancho
6	MF	MEX	Andrés Iniestra
7	MF	MEX	Giovani Hernández
8	MF	MEX	José Plascencia
9	FW	BRA	Christian
10	MF	MEX	Tony Figueroa
11	MF	MEX	Daniel Álvarez
14	DF	MEX	Brayton Vázquez
16	MF	USA	Miguel Ramírez (on loan from América)
17	MF	MEX	Jesse Zamudio
18	MF	MEX	Josué Gómez

No.	Pos.	Nation	Player
19	FW	MEX	Raúl Camacho
20	MF	USA	Adrián Sánchez
21	DF	MEX	Edson García
22	GK	MEX	Paolo Bedolla
23	MF	MEX	Pablo González
24	FW	MEX	Érick Robles
25	MF	MEX	Bryan Flores
26	MF	MEX	Juan Blanco
27	GK	MEX	Santiago Ramírez
28	MF	MEX	Jesús Hernández (on loan from Pachuca)
29	DF	MEX	Mario Trejo
30	GK	MEX	Abraham Nuño
31	DF	MEX	Roger Hernández
35	GK	MEX	Andrey Luna

== Reserves ==
=== Progreso de Cocula ===
The team competes in the Liga TDP, the fourth level of Mexican football.

== Managers ==
- (Argentina) Pablo Sabater (2014–2015)
- (Argentina) Silvio Rudman (2016–2018)
- (Mexico) Miguel Gómez (2018)
- (Canada) Isidro Sánchez (2018–2019)
- (Argentina) Lorenzo Sáez (2019–2020)
- (Mexico) Irving Rubirosa (2020–2021)
- (Argentina) Silvio Rudman (2021)
- (Mexico) Juan Antonio Torres (2021–2022)
- (Mexico) Jorge Villalpando (2022–2023)
- (Mexico) Javier Contreras (2023)
- (Mexico) Paco Ramírez (2024)
- (Mexico) Luis Orozco (2025)
- (Mexico) Marco Fabián Vázquez (2025–2026)
- (Brazil) Gustavo Leal (2026)
- (Mexico) Arturo Ortega (2026–)

== Badge ==
2016–2019

== Honours ==
Domestic
Type	Competition	Titles	Seasons	Runners-up
Lower levels FMF	Segunda División	2	Ape–2016, Cla–2017	Ape–2015
Lower levels FMF	Campeón de Campeones Segunda División	1	2017	—
Lower levels FMF	Liga Premier Serie B	0	—	Ape–2017
