= Sahuayo F.C. =

Mexican football club

Sahuayo
- Full name: Sahuayo Fútbol Club
- Nickname(s): Los Tigres (The Tigers)
- Founded: 3 March 2014; 11 years ago
- Ground: Unidad Deportiva Municipal, Sahuayo, Michoacán, Mexico
- Capacity: 1,500
- Owner: Talentos Deportivos AC
- Chairman: Armando Tejeda
- Manager: Iván Reyes
- League: Liga TDP
- 2018-19: Preseason
Home colours	Away colours

The Sahuayo Fútbol Club, commonly known as Sahuayo, is a Mexican football club based in Sahuayo. The club was founded in 2013, and currently plays in the Liga TDP, the club played in Serie B of Liga Premier, but in 2019, this team was dissolved, maintaining the third division squad.

== Players ==
=== Current squad ===
Note: Flags indicate national team as defined under FIFA eligibility rules; some limited exceptions apply. Players may hold more than one non-FIFA nationality.

No. / Pos. / Nation / Player	No. / Pos. / Nation / Player
