= 2014–15 Liga Premier de Ascenso season =

Liga Premier de Ascenso
- Season: 2014–15
- Dates: 22 August 2014 – 16 May 2015
- Champions: Apertura: Loros UdeC; Clausura; Potros UAEM
- Matches: 450
- Goals: 888 (1.97 per match)
- Top goalscorer: Apertura: Dante Osorio (12 goals); Clausura; Luis Eduardo Rodríguez (18 goals)
- Biggest home win: Apertura: Atlético Chiapas 5–0 Real Cuautitlán (14 September 2014); Clausura; Ocelotes UNACH 10–0 Real Cuautitlán (21 March 2015)
- Biggest away win: Apertura: Teca UTN 0–4 Potros UAEM (7 November 2014); Clausura; Murciélagos 0–4 Reynosa (21 March 2015)
- Highest scoring: Apertura: Potros UAEM (33 points); Clausura; Reynosa (28 points)
- Stats are from the regular season only

The 2014–15 Liga Premier de Ascenso season was split in two tournaments Apertura and Clausura. Liga Premier was the third-tier football league of Mexico. The season was played between 22 August 2014 and 16 May 2015.

== Torneo Apertura ==
=== Changes from the previous season ===
27 teams participated in this tournament.

- Bravos de Nuevo Laredo was relocated to Soledad de Graciano Sánchez and renamed Santos de Soledad.
- Unión de Curtidores moved to Tuxtla Gutiérrez and renamed Atlético Chiapas.
- Deportivo de Los Altos relocated to Ciudad Nezahualcóyotl and renamed Toros Neza.
- Linces de Tlaxcala relocated to Acapulco and became Internacional de Acapulco.
- Tlaxcala F.C. was a new team created from the registration of Águilas Reales de Zacatecas and the Pachuca's Third Division team.
- Cruz Azul Jasso renamed Cruz Azul Hidalgo.
- Irapuato F.C., Vaqueros de Ameca, Delfines del Carmen "B" and Patriotas de Córdoba had dissolved.
- Due to creation of Mineros de Zacatecas, Estudiantes Tecos "B" became the main team of the franchise. Also, Águilas Reales ceased to exist and gave its registration to a new club.
- Atlético Coatzacoalcos remains in this division, pending certification to participate in the Ascenso MX.
- Cachorros UdeG became the Leones Negros U-20 team, so they abandoned the Liga Premier de Ascenso.
- Teca UTN moved to Huixquilucan.
- Coras de Tepic became a reserve team of the Ascenso MX club.

==== Group 1 ====
Location of teams in the 2014–15 LPA Group 1

Club	City	Stadium	Capacity
Alacranes de Durango	Durango City, Durango	Francisco Zarco	18,000
Cimarrones	Hermosillo, Sonora	Héctor Espino	15,000
Coras de Tepic	Tepic, Nayarit	Olímpico Santa Teresita	4,000
Dorados Fuerza UACH	Chihuahua City, Chihuahua	Olímpico Universitario José Reyes Baeza	22,000
Estudiantes Tecos	Zapopan, Jalisco	Tres de Marzo	18,750
Indios UACJ	Ciudad Juárez, Chihuahua	Olímpico Benito Juárez	19,703
Loros UdeC	Colima City, Colima	Estadio Olímpico Universitario de Colima	11,812
Murciélagos	Guamúchil, Sinaloa	Coloso del Dique	5,000
Reynosa	Reynosa, Tamaulipas	Unidad Deportiva Solidaridad	20,000
Querétaro "B"	Querétaro City, Querétaro	Corregidora	33,070
Santos de Soledad	Soledad de Graciano Sánchez, San Luis Potosí	Unidad Deportiva 21 de Marzo	8,000
Tampico Madero	Tampico Madero, Tamaulipas	Tamaulipas	19,667
Tuzos UAZ	Zacatecas City, Zacatecas	Francisco Villa	14,000

==== Group 2 ====
Location of teams in the 2014-15 LPA Group 2

Club	City	Stadium	Capacity
Albinegros de Orizaba	Orizaba, Veracruz	Socum	7,000
Atlético Chiapas	Tuxtla Gutiérrez, Chiapas	Víctor Manuel Reyna	29,001
Atlético Coatzacoalcos	Coatzacoalcos, Veracruz	Rafael Hernández Ochoa	4,800
Atlético Veracruz	Veracruz, Veracruz	UVM Campus Villa Rica	2,000
Cruz Azul Hidalgo	Jasso, Hidalgo	10 de Diciembre	7,761
Internacional de Acapulco	Acapulco, Guerrero	Unidad Deportiva Acapulco / Mariano Matamoros	13,000 / 16,000
Inter Playa	Playa del Carmen, Quintana Roo	Unidad Deportiva Mario Villanueva Madrid	7,500
Ocelotes UNACH	Tapachula, Chiapas	Olímpico de Tapachula	11,000
Pioneros de Cancún	Cancún, Quintana Roo	Andrés Quintana Roo	17,289
Potros UAEM	Toluca, State of Mexico	Alberto "Chivo" Córdoba	32,603
Real Cuautitlán	Cuautitlán, State of Mexico	Los Pinos	5,000
Teca UTN	Huixquilucan, State of Mexico	Alberto Pérez Navarro	3,000
Tlaxcala	Tlaxcala City, Tlaxcala	Tlahuicole	7,000
Toros Neza	Ciudad Nezahualcóyotl, State of Mexico	Neza 86	20,000

=== Regular season ===
==== Group 1 ====
===== Standings =====
Pos	Team	Pld	W	D	L	GF	GA	GD	Pts	Qualification
1	Cimarrones de Sonora	12	7	3	2	18	11	+7	25	Advance to Liguilla de Liga
2	Indios UACJ	12	6	5	1	19	10	+9	24	Advance to Liguilla de Liga
3	Loros UdeC	12	7	2	3	20	15	+5	24	Advance to Liguilla de Liga
4	Tuzos UAZ	12	5	5	2	16	18	−2	22	Advance to Liguilla de Copa
5	Murciélagos	12	4	6	2	22	17	+5	21	Advance to Liguilla de Copa
6	Coras de Tepic	12	6	3	3	13	12	+1	21	Advance to Liguilla de Copa
7	Reynosa	12	6	0	6	15	15	0	19	Advance to Liguilla de Copa
8	Querétaro "B"	12	4	2	6	12	15	−3	14	
9	Estudiantes Tecos	12	3	3	6	12	18	−6	14	
10	Alacranes de Durango	12	2	4	6	15	20	−5	11	
11	Santos de Soledad	12	2	5	5	12	17	−5	11	
12	Tampico Madero	12	3	1	8	13	22	−9	11	
13	Dorados Fuerza UACH	12	1	5	6	7	14	−7	8	

Last updated on November 16, 2014.
Source: SoccerWay

===== Results =====
Home \ Away	ALD	CIM	COR	DFU	EST	IUJ	LUC	MUR	REY	QRO	SSL	TAM	UAZ
Alacranes					2–2	0–1		2–2		1–1		3–1	0–2
Cimarrones	3–1		3–1			1–1		2–1	2–1	0–1			
Coras Tepic	1–0				1–0	1–1		1–1	2–0	2–1			
Dorados UACH	1–1	0–1	0–1				1–1	1–1	3–0				0–0
Estudiantes Tecos		0–0		2–0			1–2				1–1	1–3	
Indios UACJ				2–0	2–0		1–1				2–0	3–2	
Loros UdeC	2–4	1–3	3–0					2–1	1–3	2–1			1–0
Murciélagos					4–1	2–2				3–1	3–3	1–0	1–1
Reynosa	1–0				2–0	2–1		1–2		1–2		3–0	
Querétaro "B"				1–0	0–2	0–2					1–1	3–0	0–1
Santos Soledad	3–1	2–0	0–1	1–1			0–3		0–1				0–0
Tampico Madero		0–1	1–1	3–0			0–1				3–1		
Tuzos UAZ		2–2	2–1		1–2	1–1			2–0			4–0	

Updated to match(es) played on 16 November 2014. Source: SoccerWay
Legend: Blue = home team win; Yellow = draw; Red = away team win.

==== Group 2 ====
===== Standings =====
Pos	Team	Pld	W	D	L	GF	GA	GD	Pts	Qualification
1	Potros UAEM	13	9	2	2	24	9	+15	33	Advance to Liguilla de Liga
2	Tlaxcala	13	9	1	3	25	14	+11	29	Advance to Liguilla de Liga
3	Albinegros de Orizaba	13	7	3	3	17	11	+6	26	Advance to Liguilla de Liga
4	Cruz Azul Hidalgo	13	7	2	4	22	10	+12	24	Advance to Liguilla de Liga
5	Atlético Coatzacoalcos	13	7	3	3	18	11	+7	24	Advance to Liguilla de Liga
6	Ocelotes UNACH	13	7	3	3	16	12	+4	24	Advance to Liguilla de Copa
7	Pioneros de Cancún	13	6	3	4	18	17	+1	21	Advance to Liguilla de Copa
8	Teca UTN	13	6	3	4	11	15	−4	21	Advance to Liguilla de Copa
9	Toros Neza	13	4	6	3	17	13	+4	18	Advance to Liguilla de Copa
10	Atlético Chiapas	13	3	4	6	17	20	−3	15	
11	Internacional de Acapulco	13	2	3	8	12	18	−6	11	
12	Inter Playa del Carmen	13	2	4	7	17	24	−7	10	
13	Atlético Veracruz	13	1	2	10	12	23	−11	5	
14	Real Cuautitlán	13	0	3	10	4	33	−29	3	

Last updated on November 16, 2014.
Source: SoccerWay

===== Results =====
Home \ Away	ADO	ACH	ATC	AVE	CRH	IAC	INP	OUC	PIO	PUM	RCU	TEC	TLA	TNZ
Albinegros		1–1			2–0		2–1	0–0	3–1				1–0	2–2
Atlético Chiapas			1–2	3–3					1–2		5–0	1–0		0–1
At. Coatzacoalcos	1–0				3–2	2–1	5–1	0–1		0–0			2–1	
At. Veracruz	0–1		0–1			2–2				1–3	5–0	0–1	0–1	
Cruz Azul Hidalgo		2–0		4–0					3–1		3–0	0–1		2–1
Internacional	3–0	0–1			0–2		1–1	1–2		0–2			0–2	
Inter Playa		2–2		1–0	1–1				1–2		5–0			1–1
Ocelotes UNACH		3–1		2–1	0–0		2–0		1–1					1–0
Pioneros			2–1	2–0		1–0					1–1	0–1	4–3	1–1
Potros UAEM	2–1	3–0			0–3		2–0	3–1	1–0				1–2	
Real Cuautitlán	0–1		0–0			0–3		2–3		0–2		1–1		
Teca UTN	0–3		1–0			1–1	2–1	1–0		0–4				
Tlaxcala		1–1			1–0		4–2	2–0			2–0	3–1		
Toros Neza			1–1	2–0		2–0				1–1	2–0	1–1	2–3	

Updated to match(es) played on 16 November 2014. Source: SoccerWay
Legend: Blue = home team win; Yellow = draw; Red = away team win.

=== Regular-season statistics ===
==== Top goalscorers ====
Players sorted first by goals scored, then by last name.

Rank	Player	Club	Goals
1	(Mexico) Dante Osorio	Potros UAEM	12
2	(Mexico) Daniel González Vega	Tlaxcala	10
3	(Mexico) José Luis Delgadillo	Inter Playa del Carmen	9
4	(Mexico) Carlos Cauich	Pioneros de Cancún	8
4	(Mexico) Christian Rodríguez Rocha	Murciélagos	8
6	(Mexico) Kevin Favela	Albinegros de Orizaba	6
6	(Mexico) Jesús Alberto Lara	Cruz Azul Hidalgo	6

=== Liguilla ===
==== Liguilla de Ascenso (Promotion Playoffs) ====
The four best teams of each group play two games against each other on a home-and-away basis. The higher seeded teams play on their home field during the second leg. The winner of each match up is determined by aggregate score. In the quarterfinals and semifinals, if the two teams are tied on aggregate the higher seeded team advances. In the final, if the two teams are tied after both legs, the match goes to extra time and, if necessary, a penalty shoot-out.

Quarter-finals
1	Potros UAEM (t.p.)	1	3	4
8	Atlético Coatzacoalcos	2	2	4
3	Albinegros de Orizaba	2	1	2
6	Indios UACJ	2	3	5
2	Tlaxcala	0	2	2
7	Cruz Azul Hidalgo	1	0	1
4	Cimarrones de Sonora	0	4	4
5	Loros UdeC	0	0	0

Semi-finals
1	Potros UAEM (t.p.)	2	1	3
6	Indios UACJ	1	2	3
2	Tlaxcala	1	0	1
4	Cimarrones de Sonora	3	0	3

Final
1	Potros UAEM	0	2	2
4	Cimarrones de Sonora	1	0	1

- (t.p.) The team was classified by its best position in the general table

===== Quarter-finals =====
Team 1	Agg.	Team 2	1st leg	2nd leg
Potros UAEM	4–4	Atlético Coatzacoalcos	1–2	3–2
Albinegros de Orizaba	3–5	Indios UACJ	2–2	1–3
Tlaxcala	2–1	Cruz Azul Hidalgo	0–1	2–0
Cimarrones de Sonora	4–0	Loros UdeC	0–0	4–0

====== First leg ======
22 November 2014	Albinegros de Orizaba	2–2	Indios UACJ	Orizaba, Veracruz
12:00	Favela 8', 65'	Report	García 49'; Tapia 72'	Stadium: Estadio Socum; Attendance: 3,000

22 November 2014	Loros UdeC	0–0	Cimarrones de Sonora	Colima, Colima
16:00		Report		Stadium: Estadio Olímpico Universitario de Colima; Attendance: 500

22 November 2014	Atlético Coatzacoalcos	2–1	Potros UAEM	Coatzacoalcos, Veracruz
17:00	Alba 41'; Ortíz 84'	Report	Ochoa 18'	Stadium: Estadio Rafael Hernández Ochoa; Attendance: 1,000

23 November 2014	Cruz Azul Hidalgo	1–0	Tlaxcala	Ciudad Cooperativa, Hidalgo
12:00	González 65'	Report		Stadium: Estadio 10 de Diciembre; Attendance: 500

====== Second leg ======
28 November 2014	Potros UAEM	3–2 (4–4 agg.)	Atlético Coatzacoalcos	Toluca, State of Mexico
15:00	Ochoa 34'; Osorio 45'; Jerónimo 45'	Report	Ortíz 5', 8'	Stadium: Estadio Universitario Alberto "Chivo" Córdoba; Attendance: 2,000

28 November 2014	Cimarrones de Sonora	4–0 (4–0 agg.)	Loros UdeC	Hermosillo, Sonora
20:15	Villa 10', 65', 90'; López 49'	Report		Stadium: Estadio Héctor Espino; Attendance: 9,000

29 November 2014	Indios UACJ	3–1 (5–3 agg.)	Albinegros de Orizaba	Ciudad Juárez, Chihuahua
17:00	Gómez 6', 46'; Bustos 7'	Report	Favela 87'	Stadium: Estadio Olímpico Benito Juárez; Attendance: 6,000

29 November 2014	Tlaxcala	2–0 (2–1 agg.)	Cruz Azul Hidalgo	Tlaxcala, Tlaxcala
18:00	González 5'; Calderón 83'	Report		Stadium: Estadio Tlahuicole; Attendance: 4,000

===== Semi-finals =====
Team 1	Agg.	Team 2	1st leg	2nd leg
Potros UAEM	3–3	Indios UACJ	2–1	1–2
Tlaxcala	1–3	Cimarrones de Sonora	1–3	0–0

====== First leg ======
3 December 2014	Indios UACJ	1–2	Potros UAEM	Ciudad Juárez, Chihuahua
17:00	Gómez 29'	Report	Alcántar 34'; Morales 55'	Stadium: Estadio Olímpico Benito Juárez; Attendance: 10,000

3 December 2014	Cimarrones de Sonora	3–1	Tlaxcala	Hermosillo, Sonora
20:15	López 30', 38'; Silva 90'	Report	Cruz 54'	Stadium: Estadio Héctor Espino; Attendance: 12,000

====== Second leg ======
6 December 2014	Potros UAEM	1–2 (3–3 agg.)	Indios UACJ	Toluca, State of Mexico
15:00	Estala 76'	Report	Gómez 8', 42'	Stadium: Estadio Universitario Alberto "Chivo" Córdoba; Attendance: 1,500

6 December 2014	Tlaxcala	0–0 (1–3 agg.)	Cimarrones de Sonora	Tlaxcala, Tlaxcala
18:00		Report		Stadium: Estadio Tlahuicole; Attendance: 5,000

===== Final =====
Team 1	Agg.	Team 2	1st leg	2nd leg
Potros UAEM	2–1	Cimarrones de Sonora	0–1	2–0

====== First leg ======
10 December 2014	Cimarrones de Sonora	1–0	Potros UAEM	Hermosillo, Sonora
20:15	Martínez 90'	Report		Stadium: Estadio Héctor Espino; Attendance: 17,000

====== Second leg ======
13 December 2014	Potros UAEM	2–0 (2–1 agg.)	Cimarrones de Sonora	Toluca, State of Mexico
15:00	Morales 42'; Figueroa 90'	Report		Stadium: Estadio Universitario Alberto "Chivo" Córdoba; Attendance: 10,000

Apertura 2014 winners:
Potros UAEM
1st title

==== Liguilla de Copa ====
The Copa de la Segunda División (Second Division Cup) was a tournament created for those teams that had no chance to play the Liguilla de Ascenso. In each of the leagues the regular season is disputed for each tournament, the first eight (four of each group) advance to their respective league to determine the champion of the league, the next four of each group accessed the cup liguilla. If a team had no right to promotion, or was a reserve could not play promotion playoffs, so if he was in higher positions directly access the Cup, and gave way to teams that could rise.

Quarter-finals
9	Ocelotes UNACH	1	2	3
16	Toros Neza	2	0	2
12	Pioneros	2	1	3
13	Coras de Tepic	1	1	2
10	Tuzos UAZ	1	2	3
15	Reynosa	1	1	2
11	Murciélagos	3	1	4
14	Teca UTN	0	2	2

Semi-finals
9	Ocelotes UNACH	0	2	2
12	Pioneros	0	1	1
10	Tuzos UAZ	0	1	1
11	Murciélagos	2	1	3

Final
9	Ocelotes UNACH	0	1	1
11	Murciélagos	1	2	3

Apertura 2014 winners:
Murciélagos
1st title

== Torneo Clausura ==
=== Changes from the previous tournament ===
- Internacional de Acapulco was relocated to Estadio Mariano Matamoros on Xochitepec, Morelos. The club had to leave Acapulco due to the social and political situation lived in the State of Guerrero

=== Regular season ===
==== Group 1 ====
===== Standings =====
Pos	Team	Pld	W	D	L	GF	GA	GD	Pts	Qualification
1	Reynosa	12	8	2	2	23	10	+13	28	Advance to Liguilla de Liga
2	Loros UdeC	12	6	4	2	24	14	+10	26	Advance to Liguilla de Liga
3	Tampico Madero	12	7	3	2	22	14	+8	26	Advance to Liguilla de Liga
4	Cimarrones de Sonora	12	6	5	1	19	9	+10	25	Advance to Liguilla de Liga
5	Querétaro	12	5	3	4	22	16	+6	20	Advance to Liguilla de Copa
6	Dorados Fuerza UACH	12	5	2	5	16	18	−2	18	Advance to Liguilla de Copa
7	Estudiantes Tecos	12	4	3	5	15	17	−2	15	Advance to Liguilla de Copa
8	Indios UACJ	12	4	2	6	11	16	−5	15	
9	Murciélagos	12	3	4	5	12	19	−7	14	
10	Santos de Soledad	12	3	2	7	19	22	−3	13	
11	Coras de Tepic	12	4	0	8	12	21	−9	12	
12	Tuzos UAZ	12	2	4	6	12	20	−8	11	
13	Alacranes de Durango	12	2	4	6	9	20	−11	10	

Last updated on April 12, 2015.
Source: SoccerWay

===== Results =====
Home \ Away	ALD	CIM	COR	DFU	EST	IUJ	LUC	MUR	REY	QRO	SSL	TAM	UAZ
Alacranes		0–3	4–2	1–3			0–2		1–1		1–0		
Cimarrones				2–1	3–1		1–1				0–0	3–0	2–0
Coras Tepic		2–0		1–0			0–1				2–0	1–4	2–1
Dorados UACH					1–0	1–1				1–0	2–1	2–1	
Estudiantes Tecos	2–0		2–0			1–0		2–0	0–1	0–2			2–2
Indios UACJ	1–1	0–1	2–1					1–0	0–2	1–3			2–0
Loros UdeC				2–2	3–0	3–1					5–3	2–2	
Murciélagos	1–1	2–2	1–0	2–1			2–1		0–4				
Reynosa		1–1	4–1	3–1			1–0				2–1		3–1
Querétaro "B"	4–0	1–1	2–0				0–2	3–3	2–0				
Santos Soledad					4–4	0–2		2–0		3–2		1–2	
Tampico Madero	1–0				1–1	3–0		1–1	2–1	4–2			1–0
Tuzos UAZ	0–0			4–1			2–2	1–0		1–1	0–4		

Updated to match(es) played on 12 April 2015. Source: SoccerWay
Legend: Blue = home team win; Yellow = draw; Red = away team win.

==== Group 2 ====
===== Standings =====
Pos	Team	Pld	W	D	L	GF	GA	GD	Pts	Qualification
1	Inter Playa del Carmen	13	8	1	4	20	13	+7	27	Advance to Liguilla de Liga
2	Cruz Azul Hidalgo	13	7	4	2	27	11	+16	26	Advance to Liguilla de Liga
3	Tlaxcala	13	7	4	2	22	12	+10	26	Advance to Liguilla de Liga
4	Pioneros de Cancún	13	5	7	1	13	12	+1	24	Advance to Liguilla de Liga
5	Ocelotes UNACH	13	6	3	4	32	17	+15	23	Advance to Liguilla de Copa
6	Atlético Chiapas	13	6	4	3	17	10	+7	22	Advance to Liguilla de Copa
7	Teca UTN	13	5	4	4	14	13	+1	20	Advance to Liguilla de Copa
8	Albinegros de Orizaba	13	5	4	4	16	14	+2	19	Advance to Liguilla de Copa
9	Toros Neza	13	4	3	6	13	16	−3	17	Advance to Liguilla de Copa
10	Potros UAEM	13	3	6	4	26	15	+11	15	
11	Real Cuautitlán	13	4	2	7	11	23	−12	15	
12	Atlético Veracruz	13	3	3	7	9	21	−12	12	
13	Internacional de Acapulco	13	2	2	9	15	40	−25	10	
14	Atlético Coatzacoalcos	13	2	1	10	13	31	−18	8	

Last updated on April 12, 2015.
Source: SoccerWay

===== Results =====
Home \ Away	ADO	ACH	ATC	AVE	CRH	IAC	INP	OUC	PIO	PUM	RCU	TEC	TLA	TNZ
Albinegros			3–0	4–1		0–2				1–0	1–0	0–0		
Atlético Chiapas	1–1				0–1	5–0	1–0	1–0		1–1			0–0	
At. Coatzacoalcos		2–1		0–1					1–1		2–3	1–2		0–1
At. Veracruz		1–0			0–0		0–2	3–0	0–1					1–1
Cruz Azul Hidalgo	3–1		5–2				3–0	2–2		4–1			3–0	
Internacional			3–2	2–2	1–4				1–1		0–2	0–3		1–2
Inter Playa	3–1		1–0			5–2		0–1		1–1		1–0	3–2	
Ocelotes UNACH	2–1		0–3			8–2				1–1	10–0	2–0	2–2	
Pioneros	0–0	2–2			1–1		1–0	2–1		0–0				
Potros UAEM			9–0	6–0		4–1					1–1	0–0		1–3
Real Cuautitlán		0–1		2–0	1–0		0–2		0–0				0–1	0–2
Teca UTN		1–2		1–0	2–1				0–2		3–2		1–1	1–1
Tlaxcala	2–2		1–0	2–0		2–0			5–0	2–1				2–0
Toros Neza	0–1	1–2			0–0		1–2	0–3	1–2					

Updated to match(es) played on 12 April 2015. Source: SoccerWay
Legend: Blue = home team win; Yellow = draw; Red = away team win.

=== Regular-season statistics ===
==== Top goalscorers ====
Players sorted first by goals scored, then by last name.

Rank	Player	Club	Goals
1	(Mexico) Jonathan Ramón Ruíz	Ocelotes UNACH	14
2	(Mexico) Juan Carlos Martínez	Loros UdeC	13
3	(Mexico) Abrahám Ávalos Ceja	Internacional de Acapulco	8
3	(Mexico) Omar Rosas Salomón	Albinegros de Orizaba	8
3	(Mexico) Efraín Torres Silva	Santos de Soledad	8
6	(Mexico) Juan Diego González	Cruz Azul Hidalgo	7
6	(Mexico) Ramcés Hernández	Teca UTN	7
6	(Mexico) Dante Osorio	Potros UAEM	7
6	(Mexico) Moisés Hipólito León	Cruz Azul Hidalgo	7

Source: Liga Premier

=== Liguilla ===
==== Liguilla de Ascenso (Promotion Playoffs) ====
The four best teams of each group play two games against each other on a home-and-away basis. The higher seeded teams play on their home field during the second leg. The winner of each match up is determined by aggregate score. In the quarterfinals and semifinals, if the two teams are tied on aggregate the higher seeded team advances. In the final, if the two teams are tied after both legs, the match goes to extra time and, if necessary, a penalty shoot-out.

Quarter-finals
1	Reynosa (t.p.)	0	2	2
8	Pioneros	1	1	2
3	Cruz Azul Hidalgo	2	1	3
6	Tampico Madero	1	1	2
4	Loros UdeC	0	2	2
5	Tlaxcala (t.p.)	2	0	2
2	Inter Playa	2	2	4
7	Cimarrones	3	3	6

Semi-finals
1	Reynosa	0	0	0
3	Cruz Azul Hidalgo	1	1	2
4	Loros UdeC (t.p.)	2	1	3
7	Cimarrones	1	2	3

Final
3	Cruz Azul Hidalgo	2	0	2
4	Loros UdeC	1	2	3

- (t.p.) The team was classified by its best position in the general table

===== Quarter-finals =====
Team 1	Agg.	Team 2	1st leg	2nd leg
Reynosa	2–2	Pioneros de Cancún	0–1	2–1
Cruz Azul Hidalgo	3–2	Tampico Madero	2–1	1–1
Loros UdeC	2–2	Tlaxcala	0–2	2–0
Inter Playa del Carmen	4–6	Cimarrones de Sonora	2–3	2–3

====== First leg ======
17 April 2015	Inter Playa del Carmen	2–3	Cimarrones de Sonora	Playa del Carmen, Quintana Roo
20:00	Campos 45', 69'	Report	López 60', 75'; Araujo 83'	Stadium: Estadio Mario Villanueva Madrid; Attendance: 10,000

18 April 2015	Pioneros de Cancún	1–0	Reynosa	Cancún, Quintana Roo
17:00	Cob 5'	Report		Stadium: Estadio Andrés Quintana Roo; Attendance: 5,500

18 April 2015	Tlaxcala	2–0	Loros UdeC	Tlaxcala, Tlaxcala
18:00	Calderón 39'; González 77'	Report		Stadium: Estadio Tlahuicole; Attendance: 7,500

19 April 2015	Cruz Azul Hidalgo	2–1	Tampico Madero	Ciudad Cooperativa, Hidalgo
12:00	González 23'; Chavarría 83'	Report	Ogangan 90+1'	Stadium: Estadio 10 de Diciembre; Attendance: 2,000

====== Second leg ======
24 April 2015	Cimarrones de Sonora	3–2 (6–4 agg.)	Inter Playa del Carmen	Hermosillo, Sonora
20:15	López 34'; Villa 47'; Vallejo 60'	Report	Reyes 58'; Campos 68'	Stadium: Estadio Héctor Espino; Attendance: 7,000

25 April 2015	Loros UdeC	2–0 (2–2 agg.)	Tlaxcala	Colima, Colima
16:00	Amador 7', 89'	Report		Stadium: Estadio Olímpico Universitario de Colima; Attendance: 1,500

25 April 2015	Reynosa	2–1 (2–2 agg.)	Pioneros de Cancún	Reynosa, Tamaulipas
19:45	Hernández 9' (o.g. Mejía 73'	Report	Echeverría 47'	Stadium: Unidad Deportiva Solidaridad; Attendance: 12,000

25 April 2015	Tampico Madero	1–1 (2–3 agg.)	Cruz Azul Hidalgo	Tampico - Ciudad Madero, Tamaulipas
20:00	Collazos 70'	Report	González 37'	Stadium: Estadio Tamaulipas; Attendance: 25,000

===== Semi-finals =====
Team 1	Agg.	Team 2	1st leg	2nd leg
Reynosa	0–2	Cruz Azul Hidalgo	0–1	0–1
Loros UdeC	3–3	Cimarrones de Sonora	2–1	1–2

====== First leg ======
29 April 2015	Cruz Azul Hidalgo	1–0	Reynosa	Ciudad Cooperativa, Hidalgo
16:00	Acevedo 4'	Report		Stadium: Estadio 10 de Diciembre; Attendance: 500

29 April 2015	Cimarrones de Sonora	1–2	Loros UdeC	Hermosillo, Sonora
20:15	F. Martínez 15'	Report	J. Martínez 18'; Amador 35'	Stadium: Estadio Héctor Espino; Attendance: 7,500

====== Second leg ======
2 May 2015	Loros UdeC	1–2 (3–3 agg.)	Cimarrones de Sonora	Colima, Colima
16:00	Carrasco 51'	Report	López 10'; Rodríguez 67'	Stadium: Estadio Olímpico Universitario de Colima; Attendance: 3,000

2 May 2015	Reynosa	0–1 (0–2 agg.)	Cruz Azul Hidalgo	Reynosa, Tamaulipas
19:45		Report	González 25'	Stadium: Unidad Deportiva Solidaridad; Attendance: 16,000

===== Final =====
Team 1	Agg.	Team 2	1st leg	2nd leg
Cruz Azul Hidalgo	2–3	Loros UdeC	2–1	0–2

====== First leg ======
6 May 2015	Cruz Azul Hidalgo	2–1	Loros UdeC	Ciudad Cooperativa, Hidalgo
16:00	González 4'; Henestrosa 55'	Report	Verduzco 88'	Stadium: Estadio 10 de Diciembre; Attendance: 2,000

====== Second leg ======
9 May 2015	Loros UdeC	2–0 (3–2 agg.)	Cruz Azul Hidalgo	Colima, Colima
16:00	Martínez 44'; Aguilar 94'	Report		Stadium: Estadio Olímpico Universitario de Colima; Attendance: 5,000

Clausura 2015 winners:
Loros UdeC
1st title

==== Liguilla de Copa ====
Quarter-finals
9	Ocelotes UNACH	0	1	1
17	Estudiantes Tecos	3	3	6
10	Atlético Chiapas	0	2	2
15	Toros Neza	0	0	0
11	Querétaro "B"	1	3	4
14	Orizaba	1	2	3
12	Teca UTN (t.p.)	1	0	1
13	Dorados UACH	1	0	1

Semi-finals
17	Estudiantes Tecos	3	3	6
10	Atlético Chiapas	1	1	2
11	Querétaro "B"	3	1	4
12	Teca UTN	0	0	0

Final
17	Estudiantes Tecos	1	1	2
11	Querétaro "B"	0	1	1

- (t.p.) The team was classified by its best position in the general table

Clausura 2015 winners:
Estudiantes Tecos
1st title

== Relegation Table ==
P	Team	Pts	G	Pts/G
1	Tlaxcala	52	25	2.0800
2	Loros UdeC	48	23	2.0870
3	Cimarrones de Sonora	46	23	2.0000
4	Reynosa	47	24	1.9583
5	Potros UAEM	47	25	1.8800
6	Cruz Azul Hidalgo	46	25	1.8400
7	Albinegros de Orizaba	45	25	1.8.000
8	Indios UACJ	38	23	1.6522
9	Ocelotes UNACH	41	25	1.6400
10	Pioneros de Cancún	41	25	1.6400
11	Teca UTN	41	25	1.6400
12	Murciélagos	35	23	1.5217
13	Atlético Chiapas	37	25	1.4800
14	Tampico Madero	34	23	1.4783
15	Inter Playa del Carmen	36	25	1.4400
16	Tuzos UAZ	32	23	1.3913
17	Toros Neza	33	25	1.3200
18	Querétaro "B"	30	23	1.3043
19	Coras de Tepic	30	23	1.3043
20	Dorados Fuerza UACH	27	23	1.1739
21	Atlético Coatzacoalcos	29	25	1.1600
22	Estudiantes Tecos	26	23	1.1304
23	Santos de Soledad	24	23	1.0435
24	Alacranes de Durango	21	23	0.913
25	Internacional de Acapulco	21	25	0.8400
26	Real Cuautitlán	18	25	0.7200
27	Atlético Veracruz	17	25	0.6800

Last updated: 12 April 2015
Source: Liga Premier FMF
P = Position; G = Games played; Pts = Points; Pts/G = Ratio of points to games played

== Promotion Final ==
The Promotion Final is a series of matches played by the champions of the tournaments Apertura and Clausura, the game is played to determine the winning team of the promotion to Ascenso MX. The first leg was played on 13 May 2015, and the second leg was played on 16 May 2015.

Team 1	Agg.	Team 2	1st leg	2nd leg
Loros UdeC	3–1	Potros UAEM	0–0	3–1

=== First leg ===
13 May 2015	Potros UAEM	0–0	Loros UdeC	Toluca, State of Mexico
16:00		Report		Stadium: Estadio Universitario Alberto "Chivo" Córdoba; Attendance: 30,000

=== Second leg ===
16 May 2015	Loros UdeC	3–1 (3–1 agg.)	Potros UAEM	Colima, Colima
16:00	López 41'; Carrasco 43'; Aguilar 63'	Report	Ochoa 48'	Stadium: Estadio Olímpico Universitario de Colima; Attendance: 12,000

2014–15 Liga Premier de Ascenso winners:
Loros UdeC
1st title

== See also ==
- 2014–15 Liga MX season
- 2014–15 Ascenso MX season
- 2014–15 Liga de Nuevos Talentos season
