= 2016–17 Tercera División de México season =

Liga TDP
- Season: 2016–17
- Dates: 19 August 2016 – 11 June 2017
- Champions: Tecos (2nd title)
- Promoted: Tecos
- Stats are from the regular season only

The 2016–17 Tercera División season is the fourth-tier football league of Mexico. The tournament began on 16 August 2016 and finished on 11 June 2017.

== Competition format ==
The Tercera División (Third Division) is divided into 14 groups. For the 2009/2010 season, the format of the tournament has been reorganized to a home and away format, which all teams will play in their respective group. The 14 groups consist of teams who are eligible to play in the liguilla de ascenso for one promotion spot, teams who are affiliated with teams in the Liga MX, Ascenso MX and Liga Premier, which are not eligible for promotion but will play that who the better filial team in an eight team filial playoff tournament for the entire season.

The league format allows participating franchises to rent their place to another team, so some clubs compete with a different name than the one registered with the FMF.

== Group 1 ==
Group with 14 teams from Campeche, Quintana Roo and Yucatán.

Location of teams in the 2016–17 3ra División Group 1 (Campeche)
Location of teams in the 2016–17 3ra División Group 1 (Quintana Roo)
Location of teams in the 2016–17 3ra División Group 1 (Yucatán)

=== Teams ===
Team	City	Home ground	Capacity	Affiliate
Atlético de Madrid México	Cancún, Quintana Roo	Coliseo Maya	2,000	Atlético Madrid
Atlético Newell Mérida	Homún, Yucatán	Municipal de Homún	1,000	–
Caimanes de Cancún	Cancún, Quintana Roo	Rush Cancún	1,000	–
Campeche	Campeche, Campeche	La Muralla de Kin-Ha	500	—
Cantera Venados	Mérida, Yucatán	Carlos Iturralde	15,087	Venados
Chetumal	Chetumal, Quintana Roo	10 de Abril	5,000	—
Corsarios de Campeche	Campeche, Campeche	Universitario de Campeche	4,000	—
Cozumel Tres Toños	San Miguel de Cozumel, Quintana Roo	Unidad Deportiva Bicentenario	1,000	–
Deportiva Venados	Tamanché, Yucatán	Alonso Diego Molina	2,500	—
Ejidatarios de Bonfil	Cancún, Quintana Roo	Sindicato de Taxistas	1,000	–
Héroes de Zaci	Valladolid, Yucatán	Unidad Deportiva Claudio Alcocer	1,000	–
Inter Playa del Carmen	Playa del Carmen, Quintana Roo	Unidad Deportiva Mario Villanueva Madrid	7,500	Inter Playa del Carmen
Pioneros Junior	Cancún, Quintana Roo	Cancún 86	6,390	Pioneros de Cancún
Yalmakán	Puerto Morelos, Quintana Roo	Unidad Deportiva Colonia Pescadores	1,200	Yalmakán

=== League table ===
Pos	Team	Pld	W	D	L	GF	GA	GD	BP	Pts	Qualification or relegation
1	Deportiva Venados	26	17	3	6	54	26	+28	2	56	Promotion Playoffs
2	Inter Playa del Carmen	26	16	5	5	57	30	+27	2	55	Promotion Playoffs
3	Pioneros Junior	26	16	4	6	43	25	+18	3	55	Promotion Playoffs
4	Corsarios de Campeche	26	15	5	6	34	20	+14	3	53	Promotion Playoffs
5	Cantera Venados	26	10	10	6	43	30	+13	5	45	Promotion Playoffs
6	Caimanes de Cancún	26	12	5	9	40	33	+7	2	43	
7	Yalmakán	26	11	4	11	44	45	−1	1	38	
8	Campeche	26	10	5	11	45	41	+4	1	36	
9	Atlético de Madrid México	26	8	6	12	43	49	−6	3	33	
10	Cozumel Tres Toños	26	8	7	11	28	41	−13	2	33	
11	Chetumal	26	8	6	12	27	35	−8	2	32	
12	Atlético Newell Mérida	26	7	3	16	25	41	−16	3	27	
13	Heroes de Zaci	26	6	5	15	24	40	−16	2	25	
14	Ejidatarios de Bonfil	26	3	2	21	22	73	−51	1	12	

Source: 3a División

=== Final stage ===
==== First round ====
Team 1	Agg.	Team 2	1st leg	2nd leg
Inter Playa del Carmen	1–4	Cantera Venados	1–1	0–3
Pioneros Junior	2–0	Corsarios de Campeche	0–0	2–0

3 May 2017	Cantera Venados	1–1	Inter Playa del Carmen	Mérida, Yucatán
16:45	Ramírez 36'	Report	Herrera 7'	Stadium: Estadio Carlos Iturralde; Attendance: 200; Referee: Jean Pierre Salcedo Vaca

6 May 2017	Inter Playa del Carmen	0–3 (1–4 agg.)	Cantera Venados	Playa del Carmen, Quintana Roo
16:00		Report	Rossello 29', 76'; Peniche 32'	Stadium: Unidad Deportiva Riviera Maya; Attendance: 500; Referee: José Pablo Angulo Rosales

4 May 2017	Corsarios de Campeche	0–0	Pioneros Junior	Campeche City, Campeche
16:00		Report		Stadium: Estadio Universitario Campeche; Attendance: 150; Referee: Carlos Santiago Cauich Poot

7 May 2017	Pioneros Junior	2–0 (2–0 agg.)	Corsarios de Campeche	Cancún, Quintana Roo
16:00	Tlapa 35'; Cervantes 59'	Report		Stadium: Estadio Cancún 86; Attendance: 300; Referee: Jorge Carlos Ortiz León

==== Second round ====
Team 1	Agg.	Team 2	1st leg	2nd leg
Deportiva Venados	1–2	Cantera Venados	1–1	0–1

10 May 2017	Cantera Venados	1–1	Deportiva Venados	Mérida, Yucatán
17:45	Rossello 30'	Report	Tapia 4'	Stadium: Estadio Carlos Iturralde; Attendance: 550; Referee: Carlos Santiago Cauich Poot

13 May 2017	Deportiva Venados	0–1 (1–2 agg.)	Cantera Venados	Tamanché, Yucatán
15:00		Report	Ramírez 22'	Stadium: Estadio Alonso Diego Molina; Attendance: 1,000; Referee: Julio César Flores Rodríguez

==== Third round ====
Team 1	Agg.	Team 2	1st leg	2nd leg
Pioneros Junior	3–3 (2–3)	(p.) Cantera Venados	2–1	1–2

18 May 2017	Cantera Venados	1–2	Pioneros Junior	Mérida, Yucatán
17:45	Rossello 18'	Report	Estupiñán 30'; Guzmán 84'	Stadium: Estadio Carlos Iturralde; Attendance: 1,200; Referee: Wilberth Ulises Flores Cob

21 May 2017	Pioneros Junior	1–2 (3–3 agg.) (2–3 p)	Cantera Venados	Cancún, Quintana Roo
16:00	Cervantes 58'	Report	González 61'; Ramírez 80'	Stadium: Estadio Cancún 86; Attendance: 2,500; Referee: Jorge Carlos Ortiz León

- Group champion: Cantera Venados. Advance to Inter-groups stage.

== Group 2 ==
Group with 11 teams from Chiapas, Oaxaca, Tabasco and Veracruz.

=== Teams ===
Location of teams in the 2016–17 3ra División Group 3 (Oaxaca and Veracruz)
Location of teams in the 2016–17 3ra División Group 2 (Chiapas and Tabasco)
Location of teams in the 2016–17 3ra División Group 2 (Xalapa and Coyutla)

Team	City	Home ground	Capacity	Affiliate	Official Name
Atlético Acayucan	Acayucan, Veracruz	Unidad Deportiva Vicente Obregón	1,000	—	—
Atlético Boca del Río	Boca del Río, Veracruz	Unidad Deportiva Hugo Sánchez	2,500	—	–
Atlético Ixtepec	Ixtepec, Oaxaca	Brena Torres	1,000	—	–
Atlético Tonalá	Coyutla, Veracruz	Campo Ayuntamiento	1,000	—	–
Azucareros de Tezonapa	Tezonapa, Veracruz	Ernesto Jácome Pérez	1,000	—	–
Cafetaleros de Xalapa	Xalapa, Veracruz	Antonio M. Quirasco	3,000	—	Ciudad Valles
Cruz Azul Lagunas	Lagunas, Oaxaca	Cruz Azul	1,000	Cruz Azul	–
Delfines UGM	Nogales, Veracruz	UGM Nogales	1,500	—	—
Dragones de Tabasco	Villahermosa, Tabasco	Olímpico de Villahermosa	12,000	—	Real Victoria
Halcones Marinos de Veracruz	Boca del Río, Veracruz	Unidad Deportiva Hugo Sánchez	1,500	—	–
Jaguares de la 48	Reforma, Chiapas	Sergio Lira Gallardo	600	—	

=== League table ===
Pos	Team	Pld	W	D	L	GF	GA	GD	BP	Pts	Qualification or relegation
1	Cruz Azul Lagunas	20	14	3	3	49	22	+27	2	47	Promotion Playoffs
2	Azucareros de Tezonapa (Note: Excluded from the promotion playoffs for not paying the debts with the FMF)	20	10	6	4	28	16	+12	5	41	
3	Halcones Marinos de Veracruz	20	10	6	4	34	25	+9	1	37	
4	Delfines UGM	20	10	5	5	33	20	+13	1	36	Promotion Playoffs
5	Atlético Acayucan	20	8	7	5	39	31	+8	5	36	
6	Cafetaleros de Xalapa	20	7	4	9	33	38	−5	2	27	
7	Jaguares de la 48	20	6	5	9	34	35	−1	2	25	Promotion Playoffs
8	Atlético Boca del Río	20	5	6	9	27	38	−11	3	24	Promotion Playoffs
9	Dragones de Tabasco	20	2	9	9	20	31	−11	5	20	
10	Atlético Ixtepec	20	6	1	13	26	48	−22	0	19	
11	Atlético Tonalá	20	4	4	12	20	39	−19	2	18	

Source: 3a División

=== Final stage ===
==== Second round ====
Team 1	Agg.	Team 2	1st leg	2nd leg
Delfines UGM	5–2	Jaguares de la 48	2–2	3–0
Cruz Azul Lagunas	6–2	Atlético Boca del Río	3–1	3–1

6 May 2017	Jaguares de la 48	2–2	Delfines UGM	Reforma, Chiapas
11:00	López 18'; Sigall 85'	Report	Alegría 23', 36'	Stadium: Estadio Sergio Lira Gallardo; Attendance: 500; Referee: Edgar Iván Arenas Peralta

13 May 2017	Delfines UGM	3–0 (5–2 agg.)	Jaguares de la 48	Orizaba, Veracruz
13:00	Mozo 1'; Villa 14'; Ramírez 44'	Report		Stadium: Estadio Universitario UGM; Attendance: 300; Referee: Alan Manuel Pérez Ortiz

6 May 2017	Atlético Boca del Río	1–3	Cruz Azul Lagunas	Boca del Río, Veracruz
16:00	Palomares 87'	Report	Martínez 2'; Navarrete 32'; Higashi 43'	Stadium: Unidad Deportiva Hugo Sánchez Márquez; Attendance: 200; Referee: Guillermo Michel Álvarez Górriz

13 May 2017	Cruz Azul Lagunas	3–1 (6–2 agg.)	Atlético Boca del Río	Lagunas, Oaxaca
15:00	Navarrete 16', 56'; Izquierdo 48'	Report	Monroy 40'	Stadium: Estadio Cruz Azul; Attendance: 200; Referee: Eduardo Adrián Vázquez Hernández

==== Third round ====
Team 1	Agg.	Team 2	1st leg	2nd leg
Cruz Azul Lagunas	3–1	Delfines UGM	1–1	2–0

17 May 2017	Delfines UGM	1–1	Cruz Azul Lagunas	Orizaba, Veracruz
15:00	Guerra 90+2'	Report	Villa 77'	Stadium: Estadio Universitario UGM; Attendance: 700; Referee: Saúl Zurita Suárez

20 May 2017	Cruz Azul Lagunas	2–0 (3–1 agg.)	Delfines UGM	Lagunas, Oaxaca
15:00	Izquierdo 44', 47'	Report		Stadium: Estadio Cruz Azul; Attendance: 300; Referee: Wilfrido de la Cruz Pacheco

- Group champion: Cruz Azul Lagunas. Advance to Inter-groups stage.

== Group 3 ==
Group with 18 teams from Hidalgo, Oaxaca, Puebla, San Luis Potosí and Veracruz.

=== Teams ===
Location of teams in the 2016–17 3ra División Group 2
Location of teams in the 2016–17 3ra División Group 3 (Ixmiquilpan)

Team	City	Home ground	Capacity	Affiliate	Official Name
Académicos UGM	Orizaba, Veracruz	Universitario UGM Orizaba	1,500	—	—
Albinegros de Orizaba	Orizaba, Veracruz	UGM Nogales	1,500	Albinegros de Orizaba	—
Anlesjeroka	Tehuacán, Puebla	Anlesjeroka	500	—	—
CEFOR Cuauhtémoc Blanco	Huauchinango, Puebla	Nido Águila Huauchinango	300	–	–
Córdoba	Córdoba, Veracruz	Rafael Murillo Vidal	3,800	—	Colegio Once México
Deportivo Ixmiquilpan	Ixmiquilpan, Hidalgo	Unidad Deportiva Ixmiquilpan	1,000	–	Plateados de Cerro Azul
Deportivo Xiutetelco	Xiutetelco, Puebla	Corona	1,000	–	Héroes de Veracruz
Langostineros de Atoyac	Atoyac, Veracruz	Campo Deportivo Atoyac	1,000	–	Santos Córdoba
Limoneros de Martínez de la Torre	Martínez de la Torre, Veracruz	El Cañizo	3,000	–	–
Los Ángeles	Puebla, Puebla	Ex Hacienda San José Maravillas	500	—	—
Petroleros de Poza Rica	Poza Rica, Veracruz	Heriberto Jara Corona	10,000	—	—
Puebla SAI	Santa Isabel Cholula, Puebla	Santa Isabel Cholula	600	Puebla	–
Reales de Puebla	Puebla, Puebla	Preparatoria Benito Juárez	1,000	—	—
SEP Puebla	Puebla, Puebla	Centro Estatal del Deporte Mario Vázquez Raña	800	—	—
Star Club	Tlaxcala City, Tlaxcala	San José del Agua	500	—	—
Sultanes de Tamazunchale	Tamazunchale, San Luis Potosí	Deportivo Solidaridad	1,650	—	—
Tehuacán	Tehuacán, Puebla	Polideportivo La Huizachera	1,000	—	—
Tigrillos Dorados MRCI	San Jerónimo Tlacochahuaya, Oaxaca	Campo Independiente MRCI	3,000	Chapulineros de Oaxaca	–

=== League table ===
Pos	Team	Pld	W	D	L	GF	GA	GD	BP	Pts	Qualification or relegation
1	Académicos UGM	34	25	7	2	87	21	+66	3	85	Promotion Playoffs
2	Albinegros de Orizaba	34	25	5	4	69	17	+52	1	81	Promotion Playoffs
3	CEFOR Cuauhtémoc Blanco	34	22	7	5	74	22	+52	6	79	Promotion Playoffs
4	SEP Puebla	34	23	5	6	81	31	+50	5	79	Promotion Playoffs
5	Tigrillos Dorados MRCI	34	21	9	4	64	24	+40	4	76	Promotion Playoffs
6	Puebla SAI	34	23	3	8	83	40	+43	0	72	Promotion Playoffs
7	Limoneros de Martínez de la Torre	34	20	3	11	64	34	+30	1	64	
8	Petroleros de Poza Rica	34	17	6	11	57	37	+20	3	60	
9	Langostineros de Atoyac	34	15	7	12	68	55	+13	4	56	
10	Córdoba	34	10	9	15	48	53	−5	6	45	
11	Reales de Puebla	34	11	1	22	53	68	−15	1	35	
12	Los Ángeles	34	10	4	20	55	57	−2	0	34	
13	Tehuacán	34	7	9	18	29	56	−27	4	34	
14	Star Club	34	7	9	18	50	77	−27	2	32	
15	Sultanes de Tamazunchale	34	10	1	23	48	83	−35	1	32	
16	Anlesjeroka	34	7	5	22	24	61	−37	4	30	
17	Deportivo Ixmiquilpan	34	3	4	27	28	118	−90	2	15	
18	Ferrocarrileros	34	2	2	30	14	142	−128	0	8	

Source: 3a División

==== First round ====
Team 1	Agg.	Team 2	1st leg	2nd leg
SEP Puebla	2–0	CEFOR Cuauhtémoc Blanco	1–0	1–0
Académicos UGM	4–0	Puebla SAI	2–0	2–0
Albinegros de Orizaba (p.)	2–2 (3–2)	Tigrillos Dorados MRCI	0–2	2–0

3 May 2017	SEP Puebla	1–0	CEFOR Cuauhtémoc Blanco	San Pedro Cholula, Puebla
11:00	Valera 56'	Report		Stadium: Deportivo Cholula; Attendance: 40; Referee: Hugo Alberto González Acosta

6 May 2017	CEFOR Cuauhtémoc Blanco	0–1 (0–2 agg.)	SEP Puebla	Huauchinango, Puebla
13:00		Report	Valera 87'	Stadium: Nido Águila; Attendance: 350; Referee: Moisés Clement Lezma

3 May 2017	Puebla SAI	0–2	Académicos UGM	Puebla City, Puebla
12:00		Report	Zilli 5'; J. Sánchez 44'	Attendance: 200; Referee: Víctor Hugo Arroyo Sánchez

6 May 2017	Académicos UGM	2–0 (4–0 agg.)	Puebla SAI	Orizaba, Veracruz
16:00	S. Sánchez 43'; J. Sánchez 54'	Report		Stadium: Estadio Universitario UGM; Attendance: 200; Referee: Alan Manuel Pérez Ortiz

3 May 2017	Tigrillos Dorados MRCI	2–0	Albinegros de Orizaba	San Jerónimo Tlacochahuaya, Oaxaca
16:00	Hernández 38'; Chávez 59'	Report		Stadium: Campo Independiente MRCI; Attendance: 1,000; Referee: Saúl Zurita Suárez

6 May 2017	Albinegros de Orizaba	2–0 (2–2 agg.) (3–2 p)	Tigrillos Dorados MRCI	Orizaba, Veracruz
12:00	Guzmán 31'; Loyo 66'	Report		Stadium: Estadio Socum; Attendance: 500; Referee: Juan Alberto Ramírez Meza

==== Second round ====
Team 1	Agg.	Team 2	1st leg	2nd leg
Albinegros de Orizaba	2–0	SEP Puebla	0–0	2–0

10 May 2017	SEP Puebla	0–0	Albinegros de Orizaba	Puebla City, Puebla
12:00		Report		Stadium: Complejo Deportivo Los Olivos; Attendance: 200; Referee: José Vieyra Ribadeneyra

13 May 2017	Albinegros de Orizaba	2–0 (2–0 agg.)	SEP Puebla	Orizaba, Veracruz
12:00	Osorio 85'; Guzmán 90+3'	Report		Stadium: Estadio Socum; Attendance: 600; Referee: Yahir Sebastián Cabrera Morales

==== Third round ====
Team 1	Agg.	Team 2	1st leg	2nd leg
Académicos UGM	1–4	Albinegros de Orizaba	1–2	0–2

17 May 2017	Albinegros de Orizaba	2–1	Académicos UGM	Orizaba, Veracruz
13:00	Martínez 44'; Hernández 74'	Report	Carmona 24'	Stadium: Estadio Socum; Attendance: 1,500; Referee: Moisés Clement Lezma

20 May 2017	Académicos UGM	0–2 (1–4 agg.)	Albinegros de Orizaba	Orizaba, Veracruz
13:00		Report	Flores 60'; Guzmán 85'	Stadium: Estadio Universitario UGM; Attendance: 2,000; Referee: Mario Terrazas Chávez

- Group champion: Albinegros de Orizaba. Advance to Inter-groups stage.

== Group 4 ==
Group with 18 teams from Greater Mexico City and Puebla.

=== Teams ===
Location of teams in the 2016–17 3ra División Group 4 (Greater Mexico City urban area)
Location of teams in the 2016–17 3ra División Group 4 (Greater Mexico City rural area and Puebla)

Team	City	Home ground	Capacity	Affiliate	Official name
Águilas de Teotihuacán	Teotihuacán, State of Mexico	Municipal Acolman	1,000	–	–
Álamos	Venustiano Carranza, Mexico City	Magdalena Mixhuca Sports City	500	–	–
Alebrijes de Oaxaca	Huixquilucan de Degollado, State of Mexico	Alberto Pérez Navarro	3,000	Alebrijes de Oaxaca	–
Ajax Jiutepec	Huixquilucan de Degollado, State of Mexico	Alberto Pérez Navarro	3,000	–	–
Ángeles de la Ciudad	Iztacalco, Mexico City	Jesús Martínez "Palillo"	6,000	–	–
Atlético Estado de México	Cuautitlán Izcalli, State of México	Hugo Sánchez Márquez	3,500	Atlético Estado de México	–
Azules de la Sección 26	Gustavo A. Madero, Mexico City	Deportivo Francisco Zarco	500	Pachuca	–
Castores Gobrantacto	Iztapalapa, Mexico City	Deportivo Francisco I. Madero	2,000	–	–
Cefor Chaco Giménez	Atizapán de Zaragoza, State of Mexico	Ana Gabriel Guevara	1,500	–	–
Halcones Zúñiga	Cuautepec de Madero, Mexico City	Deportivo Carmen Serdán	1,000	–	–
Lobos BUAP	Puebla City, Puebla	Universitario BUAP	19,283	Lobos BUAP	–
Marina	Xochimilco, Mexico City	Valentín González	5,000	–	–
Morelos Ecatepec	Ecatepec, State of Mexico	Magdalena Mixhuca Sports City	500	–	–
Novillos Neza	Iztacalco, Mexico City	Magdalena Mixhuca Sports City	500	–	–
San José del Arenal	Chalco, State of Mexico	Arreola	2,500	–	–
Santa Rosa	Venustiano Carranza, Mexico City	Deportivo Plutarco Elías Calles	1,000	–	–
Sporting Canamy	Xochimilco, Mexico City	Momoxco	3,500	Sporting Canamy	–
Unión Magdalena Contreras	Magdalena Contreras, Mexico City	Deportivo Casa Popular	1,000	–	–

=== League table ===
Pos	Team	Pld	W	D	L	GF	GA	GD	BP	Pts	Qualification or relegation
1	Sporting Canamy	34	30	3	1	115	21	+94	2	95	Promotion Playoffs
2	Atlético Estado de México	34	28	4	2	101	21	+80	2	90	Promotion Playoffs
3	Marina	34	24	3	7	75	37	+38	2	77	Promotion Playoffs
4	Lobos BUAP	34	20	8	6	82	31	+51	5	73	Promotion Playoffs
5	Alebrijes de Oaxaca	34	21	5	8	74	38	+36	4	72	Reserve Teams Playoffs
6	Ángeles de la Ciudad	34	20	4	10	105	45	+60	1	65	Promotion Playoffs
7	Azules de la Sección 26	34	18	5	11	59	48	+11	3	62	Promotion Playoffs
8	Castores Gobrantacto	33	15	5	13	60	51	+9	3	53	
9	Álamos	34	14	7	13	52	48	+4	3	52	
10	Unión Magdalena Contreras	34	11	7	16	51	52	−1	4	44	
11	Cefor Chaco Giménez	34	8	10	16	57	72	−15	4	38	
12	Morelos Ecatepec	34	9	8	17	43	69	−26	3	38	
13	Santa Rosa	34	5	11	18	35	69	−34	7	33	
14	Halcones Zúñiga	34	7	8	19	42	75	−33	3	32	
15	San José del Arenal	33	8	6	19	37	96	−59	1	31	
16	Ajax Jiutepec	34	7	4	23	36	90	−54	3	28	
17	Águilas de Teotihuacán	34	4	8	22	23	71	−48	4	24	
18	Novillos Neza	34	1	4	29	13	126	−113	1	8	

Source: 3a División

=== Final stage ===
==== First round ====
Team 1	Agg.	Team 2	1st leg	2nd leg
Sporting Canamy	5–1	Azules de la Sección 26	1–0	4–1
Atlético Estado de México	4–1	Ángeles de la Ciudad	0–1	4–0
Marina	2–1	Lobos BUAP	1–0	1–1

3 May 2017	Azules de la Sección 26	0–1	Sporting Canamy	Venustiano Carranza, Mexico City
11:00		Report	Torres 17'	Stadium: Deportivo Francisco Zarco; Attendance: 150; Referee: José Manuel Quintero Miranda

6 May 2017	Sporting Canamy	4–1 (5–1 agg.)	Azules de la Sección 26	Xochimilco, Mexico City
11:00	Espinoza 1'; Maya 48' (own); Santillán 62', 77'	Report	Delgado 14'	Stadium: Estadio Valentín González; Attendance: 150; Referee: Santos Sebastián Garay Pérez Martínez

3 May 2017	Ángeles de la Ciudad	1–0	Atlético Estado de México	Coyoacán, Mexico City
11:00	Rangel 42'	Report		Stadium: Deportivo Rosario Iglesias; Attendance: 100; Referee: Antonio de Jesús Aguilar Gómez

6 May 2017	Atlético Estado de México	4–0 (4–1 agg.)	Ángeles de la Ciudad	Cuautitlán Izcalli, State of Mexico
11:00	Mora 22'; E. Gutiérrez 49'; J. Gutiérrez 59'; Soria 75'	Report		Stadium: Estadio Hugo Sánchez; Attendance: 500; Referee: Andrés López Díaz

4 May 2017	Lobos BUAP	0–1	Marina	Puebla City, Puebla
11:00		Report	Romualdo 11'	Stadium: Estadio Universitario BUAP; Attendance: 100; Referee: Aldair Salvador Cortés Flores

6 May 2017	Marina	1–1 (2–1 agg.)	Lobos BUAP	Xochimilco, Mexico City
16:00	Olivares 65'	Report	Hernández 20'	Stadium: Estadio Valentín González; Attendance: 200; Referee: Marco Antonio Vega Méndez

==== Second round ====
Team 1	Agg.	Team 2	1st leg	2nd leg
Atlético Estado de México	1–0	Marina	0–0	1–0

10 May 2017	Marina	0–0	Atlético Estado de México	Xochimilco, Mexico City
11:00		Report		Stadium: Estadio Valentín González; Attendance: 100; Referee: Vicente Jassiel Reynoso Arce

13 May 2017	Atlético Estado de México	1–0 (1–0 agg.)	Marina	Cuautitlán Izcalli, State of Mexico
11:00	Lemus 6'	Report		Stadium: Estadio Hugo Sánchez; Attendance: 250; Referee: Moisés Clement Lezma

==== Third round ====
Team 1	Agg.	Team 2	1st leg	2nd leg
Sporting Canamy	3–0	Atlético Estado de México	0–0	3–0

17 May 2017	Atlético Estado de México	0–0	Sporting Canamy	Cuautitlán Izcalli, Mexico City
11:00		Report		Stadium: Estadio Hugo Sánchez; Attendance: 200; Referee: Carlos Eduardo Zurita Romero

20 May 2017	Sporting Canamy	3–0 (3–0 agg.)	Atlético Estado de México	Xochimilco, Mexico City
11:00	Torres 7'; Ramírez 47'; Gama 78'	Report		Stadium: Estadio Valentín González; Attendance: 300; Referee: Abraham de Jesús Quirarte Contreras

- Group champion: Sporting Canamy. Advance to Inter-groups stage.

== Group 5 ==
Group with 13 teams from Mexico City and State of Mexico.

Location of teams in the 2016–17 3ra División Group 5

=== Teams ===
Team	City	Home ground	Capacity	Affiliate	Official name
Atlante	Tultitlán, State of Mexico	Nuevo Territorio Azulgrana	500	Atlante	–
Atlético UEFA	Coacalco, State of Mexico	Campos Fragoso	500	–	–
Calimaya	Calimaya, State of Mexico	La Hortaliza	1,000	–	Grupo Sherwood
Deportivo Vallesano	Valle de Bravo, State of Mexico	La Capilla	1,000	–	–
Estudiantes de Atlacomulco	Atlacomulco, State of Mexico	Ignacio Pichardo Pagaza	2,000	–	–
Fuerza Mazahua	Ixtlahuaca de Rayón, State of Mexico	Municipal de Ixtlahuaca	2,000	–	–
Halcones de Rayón	Santa María Rayón, State of Mexico	Unidad Deportiva Rayón	1,500	Real Halcones	–
Histeria	San Antonio la Isla, State of Mexico	Unidad Deportiva San Antonio la Isla	1,000	–	–
Jilotepec	Jilotepec, State of Mexico	Rubén Chávez Chávez	2,000	–	–
Metepec	Metepec, State of Mexico	Cancha Arqueros FC	1,000	–	–
Potros UAEM	Toluca, State of Mexico	Alberto "Chivo" Córdoba	32,603	Potros UAEM	–
Tejupilco	Tejupilco, State of Mexico	Unidad Deportiva Tejupilco	1,000	–	–
Tulyehualco	Xochimilco, Mexico City	Valentín González	5,000	–	–

=== League table ===
Pos	Team	Pld	W	D	L	GF	GA	GD	BP	Pts	Qualification or relegation
1	Potros UAEM	24	15	8	1	52	14	+38	3	56	Promotion Playoffs
2	Fuerza Mazahua	24	17	4	3	38	12	+26	1	56	Promotion Playoffs
3	Histeria	24	11	8	5	52	28	+24	5	46	Promotion Playoffs
4	Atlético UEFA	24	11	6	7	42	33	+9	3	42	Promotion Playoffs
5	Metepec	24	9	9	6	29	23	+6	6	42	
6	Atlante	24	10	6	8	35	25	+10	3	39	
7	Estudiantes de Atlacomulco	24	8	8	8	35	35	0	0	32	
8	Jilotepec	24	9	6	9	41	39	+2	1	34	
9	Calimaya	24	8	8	8	27	31	−4	2	34	
10	Deportivo Vallesano	24	8	5	11	28	37	−9	1	30	
11	Halcones de Rayón	24	5	7	12	22	35	−13	6	28	
12	Tejupilco	24	2	7	15	24	53	−29	5	18	
13	Tulyehualco	24	2	0	22	14	74	−60	0	6	

Source: 3a División

=== Final stage ===
==== Second round ====
Team 1	Agg.	Team 2	1st leg	2nd leg
Potros UAEM	4–0	Atlético UEFA	2–0	2–0
Fuerza Mazahua	3–4	Histeria	2–3	1–1

6 May 2017	Atlético UEFA	0–2	Potros UAEM	Tultitlán, State of Mexico
12:00		Report	J. Sánchez 62'; M. Sánchez 66'	Stadium: Deportivo Cartagena; Attendance: 300; Referee: Erik González Suárez

13 May 2017	Potros UAEM	2–0 (4–0 agg.)	Atlético UEFA	Toluca, State of Mexico
11:00	González 14'; J. Sánchez 70'	Report		Stadium: Estadio Universitario Alberto "Chivo" Córdoba; Attendance: 300; Referee: Carlos Eduardo Zurita Romero

6 May 2017	Histeria	3–2	Fuerza Mazahua	San Antonio la Isla, State of Mexico
13:00	Galicia 1'; Rosales 20'; González 70'	Report	Gil 41'; García 68'	Stadium: Unidad Deportiva San Antonio la Isla; Attendance: 200; Referee: Oscar Yair Toledo Pineda

13 May 2017	Fuerza Mazahua	1–1 (3–4 agg.)	Histeria	Ixtlahuaca de Rayón, State of Mexico
15:00	Mendoza 15' (own)	Report	Curiel 67'	Stadium: Estadio Municipal de Ixtlahuaca; Attendance: 500; Referee: Erik González Suárez

==== Third round ====
Team 1	Agg.	Team 2	1st leg	2nd leg
Potros UAEM	1–2	Histeria	0–2	1–0

17 May 2017	Histeria	2–0	Potros UAEM	San Antonio la Isla, State of Mexico
13:00	Blancas 22'; Rosales 76'	Report		Stadium: Unidad Deportiva San Antonio la Isla; Attendance: 200; Referee: Vicente Jassiel Reynoso Arce

20 May 2017	Potros UAEM	1–0 (1–2 agg.)	Histeria	Toluca, State of Mexico
11:00	Aguilar 41'	Report		Stadium: Estadio Universitario Alberto "Chivo" Córdoba; Attendance: 3,000; Referee: Jeison Gustavo Arellano Aguilar

- Group champion: Histeria. Advance to Inter-groups stage.

== Group 6 ==
Group with 12 teams from Guerrero, Morelos, Puebla and State of Mexico.

=== Teams ===
Location of teams in the 2016–17 3ra División Group 6 (Morelos)
Location of teams in the 2016–17 3ra División Group 6 (Guerrero)
Location of teams in the 2016–17 3ra División Group 6 (Puebla and State of Mexico)

Team	City	Home ground	Capacity	Affiliate
Acapulco	Acapulco, Guerrero	Hugo Sánchez	6,000	–
Águilas UAGro	Chilpancingo, Guerrero	Andrés Figueroa	2,000	–
Alpha	Puebla City, Puebla	Club Alpha 3	3,000	–
Artilleros Cuautla	Cuautla, Morelos	Isidro Gil Tapia	5,000	Cuautla
Atlético Cuernavaca	Cuernavaca, Morelos	Mariano Matamoros	16,000	–
Chilpancingo	Chilpancingo, Guerrero	Polideportivo Chilpancingo	1,000	–
Iguala	Iguala, Guerrero	Unidad Deportiva Iguala	1,000	–
Ixtapaluca	Ixtapaluca, State of Mexico	La Era	1,000	–
Selva Cañera	Tlayacapan, Morelos	Unidad Deportiva Tlayacapan	1,000	–
Tecuanes de Tepalcingo	Tepalcingo, Morelos	Unidad Deportiva Tepalcingo	1,000	–
Texcoco	Texcoco, State of Mexico	Unidad Deportiva Silverio Pérez	1,500	–
JFS Yautepec	Yautepec, Morelos	Armando Gómez Landeros	1,000	–

=== League table ===
Pos	Team	Pld	W	D	L	GF	GA	GD	BP	Pts	Qualification or relegation
1	Águilas UAGro	22	19	0	3	81	25	+56	0	57	Promotion Playoffs
2	Atlético Cuernavaca	22	14	5	3	57	25	+32	2	49	Promotion Playoffs
3	Alpha	22	14	4	4	65	20	+45	0	46	Promotion Playoffs
4	Artilleros Cuautla	22	11	6	5	39	22	+17	3	42	Promotion Playoffs
5	Selva Cañera	22	8	8	6	39	35	+4	7	39	
6	Tecuanes de Tepalcingo	22	10	4	8	35	24	+11	1	35	
7	Ixtapaluca	22	8	4	10	50	46	+4	3	31	
8	Texcoco	22	6	6	10	32	34	−2	2	26	
9	Iguala	22	7	2	13	35	57	−22	1	24	
10	Chilpancingo	22	5	5	12	30	39	−9	3	23	
11	Acapulco	22	6	3	13	31	41	−10	2	23	
12	JFS Yautepec	22	0	1	21	11	137	−126	0	1	

Source: 3a División

=== Final stage ===
==== Second round ====
Team 1	Agg.	Team 2	1st leg	2nd leg
Atlético Cuernavaca	2–3	Alpha	2–1	0–2
Águilas UAGro	3–2	Artilleros Cuautla	2–1	1–1

6 May 2017	Alpha	1–2	Atlético Cuernavaca	Puebla City, Puebla
12:00	Martínez 58'	Report	Estrada 19'; Betancourt 76'	Stadium: Club Alpha 3 Attendance: 200; Referee: Andro Howard Carranza González

14 May 2017	Atlético Cuernavaca	0–2 (2–3 agg.)	Alpha	Xochitepec, Morelos
15:00		Report	Struck 51'; Pomposo 87'	Stadium: Estadio Mariano Matamoros; Attendance: 200; Referee: Iván Antonio López Sánchez

7 May 2017	Artilleros Cuautla	1–2	Águilas UAGro	Cuautla, Morelos
16:00	Marban 29'	Report	Torres 33', 66'	Stadium: Estadio Isidro Gil Tapia; Attendance: 300; Referee: José Vieyra Ribadeneyra

13 May 2017	Águilas UAGro	1–1 (3–2 agg.)	Artilleros Cuautla	Chilpancingo, Guerrero
12:00	Marín 90'	Report	Belaunzaran 10'	Stadium: Estadio Andrés Figueroa; Attendance: 800; Referee: Luis Jonathan Vásquez Trujillo

==== Third round ====
Team 1	Agg.	Team 2	1st leg	2nd leg
Águilas UAGro	2–3	Alpha	0–2	2–1

17 May 2017	Alpha	2–0	Águilas UAGro	Puebla City, Puebla
16:00	Aguilar 13'; Martínez 78'	Report		Stadium: Club Alpha 3 Attendance: 500; Referee: Alfredo Medina Mendoza

20 May 2017	Águilas UAGro	2–1 (2–3 agg.)	Alpha	Chilpancingo, Guerrero
12:00	Justo 57'; Torres 70'	Report	Chacón 27'	Stadium: Estadio Andrés Figueroa; Attendance: 1,000; Referee: José Vieyra Ribadeneyra

- Group champion: Alpha. Advance to Inter-groups stage.

== Group 7 ==
Group with 19 teams from Hidalgo and Greater Mexico City.

=== Teams ===
Location of teams in the 2016–17 3ra División Group 7 (Hidalgo)
Location of teams in the 2016–17 3ra División Group 7 (Greater Mexico City)

Team	City	Home ground	Capacity	Affiliate	Official name
Atlético San Juan de Aragón	Papalotla, State of Mexico	Deportivo Municipal Papalotla	500	–	–
Aztecas AMF Soccer	Naucalpan, State of Mexico	Deportivo Hacienda	1,000	–	–
Cafetaleros FORMAFUTINTEGRAL	Ixtapaluca, State of Mexico	Unidad Deportiva La Antorcha	2,300	Cafetaleros de Tapachula	–
Cuervos Blancos	Cuautitlán, State of Mexico	Los Pinos	5,000	–	–
Escuela de Alto Rendimiento	Huixquilucan de Degollado, State of Mexico	Universidad Anáhuac México Norte	300	–	–
Guerreros de Tizayuca	Tizayuca, Hidalgo	Unidad Deportiva Tizayuca	1,000	–	–
Halcones del Valle del Mezquital	Gustavo A. Madero, Mexico City	Deportivo Los Galeana	1,000	–	–
Hidalguense	Pachuca, Hidalgo	Club Hidalguense	600	–	–
Independiente Mexiquense	Cuautitlán, State of Mexico	Los Pinos	5,000	–	–
Leones de Lomar	Iztapalapa, Mexico City	Leandro Valle	1,500	–	–
Leopardos	Iztapalapa, Mexico City	Leandro Valle	1,500	–	–
Politécnico	Venustiano Carranza, Mexico City	Deportivo Venustiano Carranza	500	–	–
Proyecto Nuevo Chimalhuacán	Chimalhuacán, State of Mexico	Deportivo La Laguna	2,000	Nuevo Chimalhuacán	–
Pumas UNAM	Coyoacán, Mexico City	La Cantera	2,000	UNAM	–
Promodep Central	Cuautitlán, State of Mexico	Los Pinos	5,000	–	–
Santiago Tulantepec	Santiago Tulantepec, Hidalgo	Unidad Deportiva Conrado Muntane	1,000	–	–
Tuzos Pachuca	San Agustín Tlaxiaca, Hidalgo	Universidad del Fútbol	1,000	Pachuca	–
Unión Acolman	Acolman, State of Mexico	San Carlos Tepexpan	1,200	–	–
Universidad del Fútbol	San Agustín Tlaxiaca, Hidalgo	Universidad del Fútbol	1,000	Pachuca	–

=== League table ===
Pos	Team	Pld	W	D	L	GF	GA	GD	BP	Pts	Qualification or relegation
1	Hidalguense	36	28	6	2	85	24	+61	3	93	Promotion Playoffs
2	Pachuca	36	28	4	4	116	34	+82	3	91	Promotion Playoffs
3	Unión Acolman	36	27	4	5	100	40	+60	1	86	Promotion Playoffs
4	Promodep Central	36	21	6	9	71	44	+27	4	73	Promotion Playoffs
5	Pumas UNAM	36	21	4	11	98	45	+53	3	70	Reserve Teams Playoffs
6	Cafetaleros FORMAFUTINTEGRAL	36	19	7	10	104	52	+52	5	69	Reserve Teams Playoffs
7	Universidad del Fútbol	36	18	5	13	68	52	+16	4	63	
8	Politécnico (Note: Excluded from the promotion playoffs for not paying the debts with the FMF)	36	17	7	12	69	58	+11	4	62	
9	Escuela de Alto Rendimiento	36	15	8	13	62	51	+11	5	58	Promotion Playoffs
10	Guerreros de Tizayuca	36	14	7	15	44	54	−10	5	54	
11	Independiente Mexiquense	36	14	7	15	69	67	+2	2	51	
12	Leopardos	36	12	6	18	56	66	−10	3	45	
13	Cuervos Blancos	36	9	9	18	45	66	−21	5	41	Promotion Playoffs
14	Aztecas AMF Soccer	36	8	8	20	42	80	−38	2	34	
15	Leones de Lomar	36	9	3	24	32	99	−67	2	32	
16	Atlético San Juan de Aragón	36	7	8	21	37	86	−49	2	31	
17	Proyecto Nuevo Chimalhuacán	36	6	6	24	42	89	−47	3	27	
18	Santiago Tulantepec	36	7	4	25	53	118	−65	1	26	
19	Halcones del Valle del Mezquital	36	4	7	25	32	100	−68	1	20	

Source: 3a División

=== Final stage ===
==== First round ====
Team 1	Agg.	Team 2	1st leg	2nd leg
Hidalguense	4–0	Cuervos Blancos	1–0	3–0
Unión Acolman	3–2	Promodep Central	1–2	2–0
Pachuca	6–1	Escuela de Alto Rendimiento	3–0	3–1

3 May 2017	Cuervos Blancos	0–1	Hidalguense	Cuautitlán, State of Mexico
16:00		Report	Aparicio 37'	Stadium: Estadio Los Pinos; Attendance: 200; Referee: Vicente Jassiel Reynoso Arce

6 May 2017	Hidalguense	3–0 (4–0 agg.)	Cuervos Blancos	Pachuca, Hidalgo
12:00	Martínez 30'; Moreno 50'; Domínguez 67'	Report		Stadium: Club Hidalguense; Attendance: 300; Referee: Martín Navarro Ortega

4 May 2017	Promodep Central	2–1	Unión Acolman	Cuautitlán, State of Mexico
16:00	Zamora 6'; Patiño 82'	Report	Miranda 90+1'	Stadium: Estadio Los Pinos; Attendance: 500; Referee: Santos Sebastián Garay Pérez Martínez

7 May 2017	Unión Acolman	2–0 (3–2 agg.)	Promodep Central	Acolman, State of Mexico
11:00	Gallardo 45'; Cabrera 86'	Report		Stadium: Estadio San Carlos Tepexpan; Attendance: 500; Referee: Saúl Zurita Suárez

4 May 2017	Escuela de Alto Rendimiento	0–3	Pachuca	Huixquilucan de Degollado, State of Mexico
19:00		Report	Rodelo 73'; León 78', 88'	Stadium: Universidad Anáhuac México Norte; Attendance: 150; Referee: Jesús Odair Chavarría Rodríguez

7 May 2017	Pachuca	3–1 (6–1 agg.)	Escuela de Alto Rendimiento	San Agustín Tlaxiaca, Hidalgo
11:00	León 27'; Rodelo 42', 73'	Report	Cayetano 64'	Stadium: Universidad del Fútbol; Attendance: 100; Referee: Ricardo Ariel Gómez Reyes

==== Second round ====
Team 1	Agg.	Team 2	1st leg	2nd leg
Pachuca	2–0	Unión Acolman	1–0	1–0

11 May 2017	Unión Acolman	0–1	Pachuca	Acolman, State of Mexico
11:00		Report	Figueroa 61'	Stadium: Estadio San Carlos Tepexpan; Attendance: 250; Referee: Tomás Jair Salazar Rivera

14 May 2017	Pachuca	1–0 (2–0 agg.)	Unión Acolman	Pachuca, Hidalgo
11:00	Rodelo 66'	Report		Stadium: Estadio Hidalgo; Attendance: 300; Referee: Juan Alberto Ramírez Meza

==== Third round ====
Team 1	Agg.	Team 2	1st leg	2nd leg
Hidalguense	2–2 (13–14)	(p.) Pachuca	–	–

17 May 2017	Pachuca	1–0	Hidalguense	San Agustín Tlaxiaca, Hidalgo
11:00	Figueroa 90+1'	Report		Stadium: Universidad del Fútbol; Attendance: 200; Referee: Santos Sebastián Garay Pérez Martínez

20 May 2017	Hidalguense	2–1 (2–2 agg.) (13–14 p)	Pachuca	Pachuca, Hidalgo
12:00	Domínguez 30'; Lara 56'	Report	Padilla 84'	Stadium: Club Hidalguense; Attendance: 500; Referee: Luis Jonathan Vásquez Trujillo

- Group champion: Pachuca. Advance to Inter-groups stage.

== Group 8 ==
14 teams from Guanajuato, Guerrero, Michoacán and Querétaro.

=== Teams ===
Location of teams in the 2016–17 3ra División Group 8 (Guanajuato and Querétaro)
Location of teams in the 2016–17 3ra División Group 8 (Michoacán and Guerrero)

Team	City	Home ground	Capacity	Affiliate	Official name
Atlético Valladolid	Morelia, Michoacán	Venustiano Carranza	22,000	–	Generales de Navojoa
Celaya	Celaya, Guanajuato	Instituto Tecnológico Celaya	1,000	Celaya	–
Delfines de Abasolo	Abasolo, Guanajuato	Municipal de Abasolo	2,500	–	–
Guerreros Zacapu	Zacapu, Michoacán	Municipal Zacapu	2,500	–	Monarcas Zacapu
Iguanas	Zihuatanejo, Guerrero	Unidad Deportiva Zihuatanejo	1,000	–	–
Lobos de Zihuatanejo	Zihuatanejo, Guerrero	Unidad Deportiva Zihuatanejo	1,000	–	–
Jaral del Progreso	Jaral del Progreso, Guanajuato	Unidad Deportiva Municipal	1,000	–	–
Originales Aguacateros	Uruapan, Michoacán	Unidad Deportiva Hermanos López Rayón	5,000	–	–
Querétaro	Querétaro, Querétaro	Parque Bicentenario	1,000	Querétaro	–
Real Querétaro	Huimilpan, Querétaro	Peña Madridista Emilio Butragueño	1,000	–	Limoneros de Apatzingán
Salamanca	Salamanca, Guanajuato	El Molinito	2,500	–	–
San Juan del Río	San Juan del Río, Querétaro	Unidad Deportiva Norte	1,000	–	–
Tigres Blancos Gestalt	Morelia, Michoacán	Venustiano Carranza	22,000	–	–
CDU Uruapan	Uruapan, Michoacán	Unidad Deportiva Hermanos López Rayón	5,000	–	–

=== League table ===
Pos	Team	Pld	W	D	L	GF	GA	GD	BP	Pts	Qualification or relegation
1	Atlético Valladolid	26	21	4	1	76	15	+61	3	70	Promotion Playoffs
2	CDU Uruapan (Note: Excluded from the promotion playoffs for not paying the debts with the FMF)	26	20	3	3	83	19	+64	3	66	
3	Tigres Blancos Gestalt	26	20	2	4	72	20	+52	0	62	Promotion Playoffs
4	Salamanca	26	17	3	6	47	28	+19	1	55	Promotion Playoffs
5	Originales Aguacateros de Uruapan	26	16	3	7	50	27	+23	1	52	Promotion Playoffs
6	Celaya	26	9	8	9	34	34	0	5	40	
7	Querétaro	26	9	5	12	38	40	−2	2	34	
8	Delfines de Abasolo	26	10	2	14	39	44	−5	1	33	
9	Iguanas	26	10	2	14	40	56	−16	1	33	
10	Guerreros Zacapu	26	8	5	13	27	31	−4	2	31	
11	Real Querétaro	26	4	5	17	20	61	−41	3	20	
12	Jaral del Progreso	26	5	4	17	31	75	−44	1	20	
13	Lobos de Zihuatanejo	26	4	4	18	22	74	−52	3	19	
14	San Juan del Río	26	3	2	21	14	69	−55	0	11	

Source: 3a División

=== Final stage ===
==== Second round ====
Team 1	Agg.	Team 2	1st leg	2nd leg
Tigres Blancos Gestalt	3–1	Salamanca	2–1	1–0
Atlético Valladolid	4–1	Originales Aguacateros	1–0	3–1

6 May 2017	Salamanca	1–2	Tigres Blancos Gestalt	Salamanca, Guanajuato
17:00	Rocha 52'	Report	Ponce 2' (own); Esquivel 66'	Stadium: Estadio El Molinito; Attendance: 400; Referee: Allan César Sánchez Baca

13 May 2017	Tigres Blancos Gestalt	1–0 (3–1 agg.)	Salamanca	Morelia, Michoacán
16:00	Hernández 38'	Report		Stadium: Estadio Venustiano Carranza; Attendance: 200; Referee: Mario Oscar Maldonado Torres

7 May 2017	Originales Aguacateros	0–1	Atlético Valladolid	Uruapan, Michoacán
12:00		Report	Sámano 29'	Stadium: Unidad Deportiva Hermanos López Rayón; Attendance: 800; Referee: Harold Rodríguez Pérez

14 May 2017	Atlético Valladolid	3–1 (4–1 agg.)	Originales Aguacateros	Morelia, Michoacán
15:00	Gaona 3'; Talavera 26'; Contreras 67'	Report	Maulion 45'	Stadium: Estadio Venustiano Carranza; Attendance: 650; Referee: Carlos Alberto Pérez Gutiérrez

==== Third round ====
Team 1	Agg.	Team 2	1st leg	2nd leg
Atlético Valladolid (p.)	1–1 (4–3)	Tigres Blancos Gestalt	1–1	0–0

18 May 2017	Tigres Blancos Gestalt	1–1	Atlético Valladolid	Morelia, Michoacán
16:00	Hernández 32'	Report	Coronado 40'	Stadium: Estadio Venustiano Carranza; Attendance: 1,200; Referee: Óscar Javier Ramírez Flores

21 May 2017	Atlético Valladolid	0–0 (1–1 agg.) (4–3 p)	Tigres Blancos Gestalt	Morelia, Michoacán
12:00		Report		Stadium: Estadio Venustiano Carranza; Attendance: 1,500; Referee: Jonathan Morales Segundo

- Group champion: Atlético Valladolid. Advance to Inter-groups stage.

== Group 9 ==
Group with 18 teams from Aguascalientes, Guanajuato, Jalisco, Michoacán and Zacatecas.

=== Teams ===
Location of teams in the 2016–17 3ra División Group 9 (Guanajuato and Michoacán)
Location of teams in the 2016–17 3ra División Group 9 (Aguascalientes, Jalisco and Zacatecas)

Team	City	Home ground	Capacity	Affiliate	Official name
Águilas Reales de Zacatecas	Zacatecas City, Zacatecas	Francisco Villa	13,000	–	–
Alcaldes de Lagos	Purísima del Rincón, Guanajuato	Unidad Deportiva Independencia	2,000	–	–
Atlético ECCA	León, Guanajuato	Lalo Gutiérrez	1,000	–	–
Atlético Leonés	Unión de San Antonio, Jalisco	Unidad Deportiva Domingo Alba	1,000	–	–
Atlético San Francisco	San Francisco del Rincón, Guanajuato	Domingo Velázquez	3,500	–	–
Cabezas Rojas	León, Guanajuato	Lalo Gutiérrez	1,000	–	–
Frailes de Jerez	Jerez, Zacatecas	Unidad Deportiva Jerez	1,000	–	Frailes Homape
León Independiente	Guanajuato City, Guanajuato	Unidad Deportiva Juan José Torres Landa	1,000	–	–
Libertadores	La Piedad, Michoacán	Juan N. López	13,356	–	–
Mineros de Fresnillo	Fresnillo, Zacatecas	Minera Fresnillo	6,000	Mineros de Fresnillo	–
Mineros de Zacatecas	Guadalupe, Zacatecas	Unidad Deportiva Guadalupe	500	Mineros de Zacatecas	–
Real Aguascalientes	Aguascalientes, Aguascalientes	Centro Deportivo Ferrocarrilero Tres Centurias	1,000	–	–
Real Magari	Lagos de Moreno, Jalisco	Salvador Reyes	2,000	–	–
Real Olmeca Colotlán	Colotlán, Jalisco	Unidad Deportiva Colotlán	1,000	–	–
Tancredi	Aguascalientes, Aguascalientes	Casa Club Necaxa	1,000	–	Atlético La Mina
Tlajomulco	Pénjamo, Guanajuato	Pablo Herrera	1,000	–	–
Tuzos UAZ	Zacatecas, Zacatecas	Universitario Unidad Deportiva Norte	5,000	Tuzos UAZ	–
Unión León	León, Guanajuato	Club Empress	500	–	–

=== League table ===
Pos	Team	Pld	W	D	L	GF	GA	GD	BP	Pts	Qualification or relegation
1	Mineros de Fresnillo	34	23	9	2	91	40	+51	3	81	Promotion Playoffs
2	Mineros de Zacatecas	34	22	6	6	83	34	+49	2	74	Reserve Teams Playoffs
3	Atlético San Francisco (Note: Excluded from the promotion playoffs for not paying the debts with the FMF)	34	20	6	8	79	44	+35	2	68	
4	Atlético Leonés	34	20	5	9	94	46	+48	2	67	Promotion Playoffs
5	Real Aguascalientes	34	19	6	9	84	51	+33	4	67	Promotion Playoffs
6	Tancredi	34	16	11	7	64	32	+32	8	67	
7	Unión León	34	18	7	9	53	35	+18	5	66	Promotion Playoffs
8	Águilas Reales de Zacatecas	34	17	6	11	50	43	+7	4	61	Promotion Playoffs
9	Tuzos UAZ	34	18	3	13	57	40	+17	2	59	
10	Libertadores de Pénjamo	34	17	5	12	65	46	+19	1	57	
11	Cabezas Rojas	34	14	9	11	68	53	+15	6	57	Promotion Playoffs
12	Atlético ECCA	34	12	9	13	42	40	+2	4	49	
13	Real Magarí	34	7	7	20	51	94	−43	3	31	
14	Frailes de Jerez	34	8	3	23	39	92	−53	1	28	
15	Real Olmeca Colotlán	34	7	5	22	42	66	−24	0	26	
16	León Independiente	34	6	4	24	35	84	−49	4	26	
17	Alcaldes de Lagos	34	5	3	26	41	93	−52	1	19	
18	Tlajomulco	34	2	6	26	28	133	−105	3	15	

Source: 3a División

=== Final stage ===
==== First round ====
Team 1	Agg.	Team 2	1st leg	2nd leg
Mineros de Fresnillo	9–3	Cabezas Rojas	4–1	5–2
Atlético Leonés	8–1	Águilas Reales	5–1	3–0
Real Aguascalientes	1–0	Unión León	0–0	1–0

3 May 2017	Unión León	0–0	Real Aguascalientes	León, Guanajuato
15:00		Report		Stadium: Club Empress; Attendance: 100; Referee: Alejandro Ruvalcaba Lomelí

6 May 2017	Real Aguascalientes	1–0 (1–0 agg.)	Unión León	Aguascalientes City, Aguascalientes
16:00	Zúñiga 74'	Report		Stadium: Centro Deportivo Ferrocarrilero Tres Centurias; Attendance: 200; Referee: Alfredo Medina Mendoza

3 May 2017	Águilas Reales	1–5	Atlético Leonés	Zacatecas City, Zacatecas
18:00	Vázquez 83'	Report	García 12', 52'; Rivera 48'; Galán 68'; López 80'	Stadium: Estadio Francisco Villa; Attendance: 100; Referee: Ricardo Emmanuel Chávez Sánchez

6 May 2017	Atlético Leonés	3–0 (8–1 agg.)	Águilas Reales	Ojuelos, Jalisco
17:00	García 26'; Rivera 27'; Galán 51'	Report		Stadium: Unidad Deportiva Ojuelos; Attendance: 100; Referee: Juan José Gutiérrez León

4 May 2017	Cabezas Rojas	1–4	Mineros de Fresnillo	León, Guanajuato
20:00	Corro 88'	Report	Rodríguez 18', 48', 54'; Goytia 56'	Stadium: Unidad Deportiva Enrique Fernández Martínez; Attendance: 300; Referee: Luis Jonathan Vásquez Trujillo

7 May 2017	Mineros de Fresnillo	5–2 (9–3 agg.)	Cabezas Rojas	Fresnillo, Zacatecas
15:00	Ramos 38'; Hernández 50', 55', 67'; Goytia 65'	Report	Rosales 13'; Pérez 28'	Stadium: Unidad Deportiva Minera Fresnillo; Attendance: 300; Referee: José Luis Luna Ramírez

==== Second round ====
Team 1	Agg.	Team 2	1st leg	2nd leg
Atlético Leonés	6–5	Real Aguascalientes	1–5	5–0

11 May 2017	Real Aguascalientes	5–1	Atlético Leonés	Aguascalientes City, Aguascalientes
16:00	Zúñiga 33'; Andrade 41', 60'; Girón 56', 90+2'	Report	López 9'	Stadium: Centro Deportivo Ferrocarrilero Tres Centurias; Attendance: 69; Referee: Martín Navarro Ortega

14 May 2017	Atlético Leonés	5–0 (6–5 agg.)	Real Aguascalientes	Ojuelos, Jalisco
17:00	Calderón 18', 46', 56'; Hernández 67'; López 81'	Report		Stadium: Unidad Deportiva Ojuelos; Attendance: 800; Referee: Miguel Ángel Anaya Suárez

==== Third round ====
Team 1	Agg.	Team 2	1st leg	2nd leg
Mineros de Fresnillo (p.)	6–6 (5–4)		–	–

18 May 2017	Atlético Leonés	3–2	Mineros de Fresnillo	Ojuelos, Jalisco
17:00	Rocha 41'; Carrera 54'; López 71'	Report	Goytia 4'; Rodríguez 45'	Stadium: Unidad Deportiva Ojuelos; Attendance: 500; Referee: Donnet Steffy Molina Sánchez

21 May 2017	Mineros de Fresnillo	4–3 (6–6 agg.) (5–4 p)	Atlético Leonés	Fresnillo, Zacatecas
15:00	Goytia 13'; Rodríguez 35'; Ávila 60'; Ramos 64'	Report	Rivera 38'; López 47', 56'	Stadium: Unidad Deportiva Minera Fresnillo; Attendance: 1,200; Referee: Eduardo Israel Escandón Vázquez

- Group champion: Mineros de Fresnillo. Advance to Inter-groups stage.

== Group 10 ==
Group with 20 teams from Colima, Jalisco and Michoacán.

=== Teams ===
Location of teams in the 2016–17 3ra División Group 10

Team	City	Home ground	Capacity	Affiliate	Official name
Acatlán	Acatlán de Juárez, Jalisco	Club Juárez	1,500	–	–
Atlético Tecomán	Tecomán, Colima	Víctor Eduardo Sevilla Torres	2,000	–	–
Aves Blancas	Tepatitlán de Morelos, Jalisco	Corredor Industrial	1,200	–	–
Charales de Chapala	Chapala, Jalisco	Municipal Juan Rayo	1,000	–	–
Chivas PROAN	San Juan de los Lagos, Jalisco	Antonio R. Márquez	1,000	Guadalajara	Real San Cosme
Escuela de Fútbol Chivas	Zapopan, Jalisco	Chivas San Rafael	500	Guadalajara	–
Mamuts de El Salto	El Salto, Jalisco	De los Mamuts	1,000	–	–
Mazorqueros	Ciudad Guzmán, Jalisco	Municipal Santa Rosa	3,500	–	–
Nuevos Valores de Ocotlán	Ocotlán, Jalisco	Municipal Benito Juárez	1,500	Leones Negros UdeG	–
Oro	Zapopan, Jalisco	Unidad Deportiva Ángel "Zapopan" Romero	3,000	–	–
Palmeros	Colima City, Colima	Colima / Carlos Septién	12,000 / 1,000	–	Deportivo Colegio Guanajuato
Picudos de Manzanillo	Manzanillo, Colima	Adolfo López Mateos	1,000	–	–
Queseros de San José	San José de Gracia, Michoacán	Juanito Chávez	1,500	–	–
Real Ánimas de Sayula	Sayula, Jalisco	Gustavo Díaz Ordaz	1,000	–	–
Sahuayo	Sahuayo, Michoacán	Unidad Deportiva Municipal	1,500	Sahuayo	–
Tepatitlán	Tepatitlán de Morelos, Jalisco	Gregorio "Tepa" Gómez	12,500	Tepatitlán	–
Valle del Grullo	Zapopan, Jalisco	Deportivo Diablos Tesistán	1,000	–	–
Tornados Tlaquepaque	Tlaquepaque, Jalisco	San Andrés	2,500	–	Atlético Cocula
Vaqueros	Tlaquepaque, Jalisco	Club Vaqueros Ixtlán	1,000	–	–
Volcanes de Colima	Manzanillo, Colima	Country Club Manzanillo	1,000	–	–

=== League table ===
Pos	Team	Pld	W	D	L	GF	GA	GD	BP	Pts	Qualification or relegation
1	Acatlán	38	24	7	7	99	43	+56	5	84	Promotion Playoffs
2	Vaqueros	38	22	9	7	91	38	+53	6	81	Promotion Playoffs
3	Charales de Chapala	38	19	14	5	68	33	+35	9	80	Promotion Playoffs
4	Oro	38	23	8	7	82	49	+33	2	79	Promotion Playoffs
5	Tepatitlán	38	23	5	10	142	67	+75	3	77	Promotion Playoffs
6	Atlético Tecomán	38	22	8	8	108	41	+67	3	77	Promotion Playoffs
7	Sahuayo	38	20	12	6	89	43	+46	3	75	
8	Chivas PROAN	38	21	7	10	99	69	+30	5	75	
9	Aves Blancas	38	20	8	10	91	51	+40	6	74	
10	Palmeros	38	21	8	9	101	42	+59	2	73	
11	Mazorqueros	38	16	11	11	78	54	+24	5	64	
12	Real Ánimas de Sayula	38	16	8	14	62	68	−6	6	62	
13	Nuevos Valores de Ocotlán	38	13	9	16	64	64	0	7	55	
14	Escuela de Fútbol Chivas	38	13	8	17	69	66	+3	7	54	
15	Picudos de Manzanillo	38	6	15	17	66	84	−18	2	35	
16	Queseros de San José	38	7	6	25	40	93	−53	3	30	
17	Mamuts de El Salto	38	5	9	24	44	105	−61	2	26	
18	Tornados Tlaquepaque	38	3	6	29	39	133	−94	3	18	
19	Valle del Grullo	38	3	2	33	33	189	−156	0	11	
20	Volcanes de Colima	38	1	4	33	27	160	−133	3	10	

Source: 3a División

=== Final stage ===
==== First round ====
Team 1	Agg.	Team 2	1st leg	2nd leg
Acatlán	2–5	Atlético Tecomán	1–3	1–2
Vaqueros	3–2	Tepatitlán	1–1	2–1
Charales de Chapala (p.)	1–1 (4–2)	Oro	1–0	0–1

3 May 2017	Tepatitlán	1–1	Vaqueros	Tepatitlán, Jalisco
17:00	Juárez 47'	Report	Rodríguez 87'	Stadium: Estadio Gregorio "Tepa" Gómez; Attendance: 300; Referee: Alan Vladimir Robles Bernal

6 May 2017	Vaqueros	2–1 (3–2 agg.)	Tepatitlán	Tlaquepaque, Jalisco
11:00	Del Toro 40'; Romero 72'	Report	Medina 68'	Stadium: Club Vaqueros Ixtlán; Attendance: 100; Referee: Jesús Omar Cárdenas Gómez

4 May 2017	Oro	0–1	Charales de Chapala	Zapopan, Jalisco
11:00		Report	Aguayo 68'	Stadium: Unidad Deportiva Ángel "Zapopan" Romero; Attendance: Luis Miguel Galván Pérez; Referee: 100

7 May 2017	Charales de Chapala	0–1 (1–1 agg.) (4–2 p)	Oro	Chapala, Jalisco
16:00		Report	Jiménez 15'	Stadium: Estadio Municipal Juan Rayo; Attendance: 500; Referee: Áxel Meza Méndez

4 May 2017	Atlético Tecomán	3–1	Acatlán	Tecomán, Colima
16:00	Muñiz 3', 90'; Valadéz 90+3'	Report	De la Torre 82'	Stadium: Estadio Víctor Eduardo Sevilla Torres; Attendance: 200; Referee: Juan David Valdez Mora

7 May 2017	Acatlán	1–2 (2–5 agg.)	Atlético Tecomán	Acatlán de Juárez, Jalisco
12:00	De la Torre 89'	Report	Valadéz 28'; Pulido 47'	Stadium: Club Juárez; Attendance: 300; Referee: David Israel Horta García

==== Second round ====
Team 1	Agg.	Team 2	1st leg	2nd leg
Charales de Chapala (p.)	2–2 (5–4)	Atlético Tecomán	0–2	2–0

11 May 2017	Atlético Tecomán	2–0	Charales de Chapala	Tecomán, Colima
16:00	Muñiz 63'; Pulido 72'	Report		Stadium: Estadio Víctor Eduardo Sevilla Torres; Attendance: 300; Referee: Alan Vladimir Robles Bernal

14 May 2017	Charales de Chapala	2–0 (2–2 agg.) (5–4 p)	Atlético Tecomán	Chapala, Jalisco
16:00	Ibarra 76'; García 90+3'	Report		Stadium: Estadio Municipal Juan Rayo; Attendance: 1,000; Referee: Jesús Omar Cárdenas Gómez

==== Third round ====
Team 1	Agg.	Team 2	1st leg	2nd leg
Vaqueros	0–2	Charales de Chapala	0–1	0–1

17 May 2017	Charales de Chapala	1–0	Vaqueros	Chapala, Jalisco
19:00	Cano 55'	Report		Stadium: Estadio Municipal Juan Rayo; Attendance: 600; Referee: Alan Vladimir Robles Bernal

20 May 2017	Vaqueros	0–1 (0–2 agg.)	Charales de Chapala	Tlaquepaque, Jalisco
16:00		Report	López 40'	Stadium: Club Vaqueros Ixtlán; Attendance: 1,000; Referee: Áxel Meza Méndez

- Group champion: Charales de Chapala. Advance to Inter-groups stage.

== Group 11 ==
Group with 18 teams from Jalisco, Nayarit and Sinaloa.

=== Teams ===
Location of teams in the 2016–17 3ra División Group 11 (Jalisco and Nayarit)

Team	City	Home ground	Capacity	Affiliate	Official name
BADEBA	San José del Valle, Nayarit	Ciudad Deportiva Bahía de Banderas	4,000	–	–
Buscando un Campeón	Zapopan, Jalisco	Cancha Morumbí	500	–	–
CAFESSA	Ameca, Jalisco	Núcleo Deportivo y de Espectáculos Ameca	4,000	–	–
Camaroneros de Escuinapa	Escuinapa, Sinaloa	Perla Camaronera	1,000	–	–
CEFUT	Zapopan, Jalisco	CEFUT	1,000	–	–
Cocula	Zapopan, Jalisco	Club Deportivo La Primavera	3,000	–	–
Coras	Tepic, Nayarit	Olímpico Santa Teresita	4,000	Coras	–
Futcenter	Tlajomulco de Zúñiga, Jalisco	Futcenter Tlajomulco	500	–	–
Gallos Viejos	Zapopan, Jalisco	Deportivo Sindicato de Telefonistas	1,000	–	–
Gorilas de Juanacatlán	Juanacatlán, Jalisco	Club Juanacatlán	500	–	
Guadalajara	Zapopan, Jalisco	Verde Valle	800	Guadalajara	–
Juventud Unida	Tlajomulco de Zúñiga, Jalisco	Club Maracaná	1,000	–	–
Leones Negros UdeG	Zapopan, Jalisco	Club Deportivo La Primavera	3,000	Leones Negros UdeG	–
Los Celtas	Zapopan, Jalisco	Metrogol Parque Metropolitano	800	–	–
Sufacen Tepic	Tepic, Nayarit	Club Sufacen Libramiento	500	–	–
Teca Huixquilucan	Zapopan, Jalisco	Deportivo Sindicato de Telefonistas	1,000	–	–
Tecos	Zapopan, Jalisco	Tres de Marzo	18,779	–	–
Xalisco	Xalisco, Nayarit	Unidad Deportiva Landereñas	500	–	–

=== League table ===
Pos	Team	Pld	W	D	L	GF	GA	GD	BP	Pts	Qualification or relegation
1	Tecos	34	27	4	3	111	29	+82	1	86	Promotion Playoffs
2	CAFESSA	34	20	10	4	69	27	+42	8	78	Promotion Playoffs
3	Guadalajara	34	21	8	5	97	31	+66	2	73	Reserve Teams Playoffs
4	Xalisco	34	19	11	4	64	30	+34	5	73	Promotion Playoffs
5	Leones Negros UdeG	34	21	7	6	60	26	+34	3	73	Reserve Teams Playoffs
6	Gallos Viejos	34	14	12	8	59	44	+15	6	60	Promotion Playoffs
7	Buscando un Campeón (Note: Excluded from the promotion playoffs for not paying the debts with the FMF)	34	15	6	13	51	41	+10	5	56	
8	Coras	34	13	7	14	59	51	+8	4	50	
9	Los Celtas	34	12	8	14	48	45	+3	5	49	Promotion Playoffs
10	Juventud Unida	34	11	10	13	48	54	−6	5	48	
11	Gorilas de Juanacatlán	34	10	9	15	48	52	−4	7	46	
12	Camaroneros de Escuinapa	34	12	5	17	42	59	−17	3	44	
13	Sufacen Tepic	34	8	13	13	60	75	−15	6	43	
14	BADEBA	34	9	10	15	46	69	−23	4	41	
15	CEFUT	34	10	8	16	58	57	+1	2	40	
16	Cocula	34	6	6	22	37	86	−49	1	25	
17	Futcenter	34	5	2	27	45	121	−76	1	18	
18	Teca Huixquilucan	34	3	4	27	25	130	−105	2	15	

Source: 3a División

=== Final stage ===
==== First round ====
Team 1	Agg.	Team 2	1st leg	2nd leg
CAFESSA	1–4	Los Celtas	0–3	1–1
Xalisco	3–1	Gallos Viejos	1–0	2–1

3 May 2017	Los Celtas	3–0	CAFESSA	Zapopan, Jalisco
11:00	Virruete 37', 89'; Landa 43'	Report		Stadium: Cancha Morumbí; Attendance: Miguel Ángel Anaya Suárez; Referee: 150

6 May 2017	CAFESSA	1–1 (1–4 agg.)	Los Celtas	Tlajomulco de Zúñiga, Jalisco
20:00	Escoto 80'	Report	Virruete 44'	Stadium: Unidad Deportiva Mariano Otero; Attendance: 300; Referee: Juan David Valdez Mora

3 May 2017	Gallos Viejos	0–1	Xalisco	Zapopan, Jalisco
11:00		Report	Cardona 27'	Stadium: Deportivo Sindicato de Telefonistas; Attendance: 20; Referee: Jonathan Morales Segundo

6 May 2017	Xalisco	2–1 (3–1 agg.)	Gallos Viejos	Xalisco, Nayarit
15:00	Sánchez 40'; Peña 47'	Report	Reynoso 33'	Stadium: Unidad Deportiva Landereñas; Attendance: 300; Referee: José Misael Burruel Zazueta

==== Second round ====
Team 1	Agg.	Team 2	1st leg	2nd leg
Tecos	2–0	Los Celtas	0–0	2–0

10 May 2017	Los Celtas	0–0	Tecos	Zapopan, Jalisco
11:00		Report		Stadium: Cancha Morumbí; Attendance: 300; Referee: José Misael Burruel Zazueta

13 May 2017	Tecos	2–0 (2–0 agg.)	Los Celtas	Zapopan, Jalisco
19:00	Suárez 68'; Ruvalcaba 88'	Report		Stadium: Estadio Tres de Marzo; Attendance: 1,500; Referee: Cristian Leopoldo Ruiz Tachiquin

==== Third round ====
Team 1	Agg.	Team 2	1st leg	2nd leg
Tecos	2–1	Xalisco	0–0	2–1

17 May 2017	Xalisco	0–0	Tecos	Xalisco, Nayarit
16:00		Report		Stadium: Unidad Deportiva Landereñas; Attendance: 570; Referee: Joaquín Alberto Vizcarra Armenta

20 May 2017	Tecos	2–1 (2–1 agg.)	Xalisco	Zapopan, Jalisco
17:00	Mares 19'; Suárez 86'	Report	Peña 23'	Stadium: Estadio Tres de Marzo; Attendance: 3,000; Referee: Jesús Omar Cárdenas Gómez

- Group champion: Tecos. Advance to Inter-groups stage.

== Group 12 ==
Group with 18 teams from Coahuila, Nuevo León, San Luis Potosí and Tamaulipas. Atlético Linares, Cinco Estrellas and Tuneros de Matehuala did not participate in the second round and their matches were canceled.

=== Teams ===
Location of teams in the 2016–17 3ra División Group 12 (Ébano, S.L.P. and Tamaulipas)
Location of teams in the 2016–17 3ra División Group 12 (Matehuala, S.L.P and Nuevo León)
Location of teams in the 2016–17 3ra División Group 12 (Coahuila)

Team	City	Home ground	Capacity	Affiliate	Official name
Armadillos de Ébano	Ebano, San Luis Potosí	Instituto Tecnológico de Ébano	1,000	–	–
Atlético Allende	Allende, Nuevo León	Parque Bicentenario	1,000	–	–
Atlético Altamira	Altamira, Tamaulipas	Lázaro Cárdenas	2,500	–	–
Atlético Linares	Linares, Nuevo León	Unidad Deportiva San Antonio	1,000	–	Leones de Huauchinango
Bravos de Nuevo Laredo	Nuevo Laredo, Tamaulipas	Unidad Deportiva Benito Juárez	5,000	–	–
Bucaneros de Matamoros	Matamoros, Tamaulipas	Pedro Salazar Maldonado	3,000	–	–
Celestes	Tampico, Tamaulipas	Unidad Deportiva Tampico	1,500	–	–
Cinco Estrellas	Monterrey, Nuevo León	Unidad Deportiva La Talaverna	5,000	–	–
Correcaminos UAT	Ciudad Victoria, Tamaulipas	Universitario Eugenio Alvizo Porras	5,000	Correcaminos UAT	–
Gavilanes de Matamoros	Matamoros, Tamaulipas	El Hogar	22,000	–	Ho Gar H Matamoros
Halcones de Saltillo	Saltillo, Coahuila	Olímpico Francisco I. Madero	7,000	–	San Isidro Laguna F.C.
Leones Blancos	Cadereyta, Nuevo León	Alfonso Martínez Domínguez	1,000	–	–
Panteras Negras GNL	Guadalupe, Nuevo León	Unidad Deportiva La Talaverna	5,000	–	–
Saltillo Soccer	Saltillo, Coahuila	Olímpico Francisco I. Madero	7,000	–	–
Tigres SD	General Zuazua, Nuevo León	La Cueva de Zuazua	800	Tigres UANL	–
Titanes de Saltillo	Saltillo, Coahuila	Olímpico Francisco I. Madero	7,000	–	Pato Baeza
Troyanos UDEM	San Pedro Garza García, Nuevo León	Universidad de Monterrey	1,000	–	–
Tuneros de Matehuala	Matehuala, San Luis Potosí	Manuel Moreno Torres	2,000	–	–

=== League table ===
Pos	Team	Pld	W	D	L	GF	GA	GD	BP	Pts	Qualification or relegation
1	Celestes	28	19	3	6	66	18	+48	2	62	Promotion Playoffs
2	Atlético Allende	28	15	9	4	47	22	+25	4	58	Promotion Playoffs
3	Troyanos UDEM	28	16	5	7	60	32	+28	4	57	Promotion Playoffs
4	Tigres SD	28	14	9	5	41	21	+20	5	56	Reserve Teams Playoffs
5	Saltillo Soccer	28	11	12	5	70	32	+38	6	51	Promotion Playoffs
6	Titanes de Saltillo	28	14	4	10	51	36	+15	3	49	Promotion Playoffs
7	Atlético Altamira	28	11	8	9	31	36	−5	5	46	
8	Armadillos de Ebano	28	12	5	11	28	39	−11	4	45	
9	Gavilanes de Matamoros	28	11	7	10	39	25	+14	3	43	
10	Bucaneros de Matamoros	28	9	10	9	36	36	0	2	39	
11	Correcaminos UAT	28	9	6	13	35	44	−9	5	38	
12	Bravos de Nuevo Laredo	28	7	7	14	33	43	−10	3	31	
13	Leones Blancos	28	5	6	17	25	62	−37	1	22	
14	Panteras Negras GNL	28	5	6	17	24	64	−40	1	22	
15	Halcones de Saltillo	28	2	3	23	23	99	−76	1	10	

Source: 3a División

=== Final stage ===
==== First round ====
Team 1	Agg.	Team 2	1st leg	2nd leg
Atlético Allende	6–2	Titanes de Saltillo	1–0	5–2
Troyanos UDEM	2–7	Saltillo Soccer	0–4	2–3

3 May 2017	Saltillo Soccer	4–0	Troyanos UDEM	Saltillo, Coahuila
19:00	Torres 18'; Medina 57', 63'; Alvarado 71'	Report		Stadium: Estadio Olímpico Francisco I. Madero; Attendance: 600; Referee: Héctor Luis Cruz Almazan

6 May 2017	Troyanos UDEM	2–3 (2–7 agg.)	Saltillo Soccer	San Pedro Garza García, Nuevo León
16:00	Reveles 59'; Castañeda 73'	Report	Solís 41'; López 76'; Tovar 82'	Stadium: Universidad de Monterrey; Attendance: 100; Referee: Francisco Javier Valles Espinoza

4 May 2017	Titanes de Saltillo	0–1	Atlético Allende	Saltillo, Coahuila
16:00		Report	Elizondo 31'	Stadium: Estadio Olímpico Francisco I. Madero; Attendance: 100; Referee: Jeison Gustavo Arellano Aguilar

7 May 2017	Atlético Allende	5–2 (6–2 agg.)	Titanes de Saltillo	Allende, Nuevo León
11:00	Medina 30', 75'; González 47'; Rodríguez 64'; Puentes 86'	Report	Cortés 23'; Clemente 90'	Stadium: Parque Bicentenario; Attendance: 300; Referee: Kevin Kober Contreras Reyes

==== Second round ====
Team 1	Agg.	Team 2	1st leg	2nd leg
Celestes	3–3 (3–4)	(p.) Saltillo Soccer	2–2	1–1

11 May 2017	Saltillo Soccer	2–2	Celestes	Saltillo, Coahuila
19:00	Medina 1'; López 77'	Report	Torres 78'; Barrón 90+1'	Stadium: Estadio Olímpico Francisco I. Madero; Attendance: 500; Referee: Jeison Gustavo Arellano Aguilar

14 May 2017	Celestes	1–1 (2–2 agg.) (3–4 p)	Saltillo	Tampico, Tamaulipas
16:00	Flores 82'	Report	Medina 5'	Stadium: Unidad Deportiva Tampico; Attendance: 500; Referee: Martín Molina Astorga

==== Third round ====
Team 1	Agg.	Team 2	1st leg	2nd leg
Atlético Allende	2–3	Saltillo Soccer	1–2	1–1

18 May 2017	Saltillo Soccer	2–1	Atlético Allende	Saltillo, Coahuila
19:00	Alvarado 19'; Tovanche 36'	Report	Aguilar 90'	Stadium: Estadio Olímpico Francisco I. Madero; Attendance: 800; Referee: Edgar Ulises Valdez Ramírez

21 May 2017	Atlético Allende	1–1 (2–3 agg.)	Saltillo Soccer	General Escobedo, Nuevo León
11:00	Aguilar 70'	Report	Torres 62'	Stadium: Polideportivo UANL; Attendance: 500; Referee: Héctor Luis Cruz Almazan

- Group champion: Saltillo Soccer. Advance to Inter-groups stage.

== Group 13 ==
Group with 11 teams from Baja California Sur, Sinaloa and Sonora.

=== Teams ===
Location of teams in the 2016–17 3ra División Group 13

Team	City	Home ground	Capacity	Affiliate	Official name
Águilas UAS	Culiacán, Sinaloa	Universitario UAS	3,500	–	–
Atlético Culiacán	Costa Rica, Sinaloa	Antonio Rosales	2,000	–	–
Cimarrones de Sonora	Hermosillo, Sonora	Miguel Castro Servín	4,000	Cimarrones de Sonora	–
Diablos Azules de Guasave	Guasave, Sinaloa	Armando "Kory" Leyson	9,000	–	–
Dorados de Sinaloa	Culiacán, Sinaloa	Unidad Deportiva Sagarpa	1,000	Dorados de Sinaloa	–
Guerreros de Obregón	Ciudad Obregón, Sonora	Manuel "Piri" Sagasta	4,000	–	–
Guerreros Pericúes	Cabo San Lucas, Baja California Sur	Complejo Deportivo Don Koll	3,500	–	–
Héroes de Caborca	Caborca, Sonora	Fidencio Hernández	3,000	–	–
Pelicanos de Puerto Peñasco	Puerto Peñasco, Sonora	La Unidad	3,000	–	–
Tijuana	Hermosillo, Sonora	Cancha Aarón Gamal Aguirre Fimbres	1,000	Tijuana	–
Titanes de Nogales	Nogales, Sonora	Jesús Jegar García	2,000	–	–

=== League table ===
Pos	Team	Pld	W	D	L	GF	GA	GD	BP	Pts	Qualification or relegation
1	Atlético Culiacán	20	13	5	2	43	20	+23	3	47	Promotion Playoffs
2	Águilas UAS	20	13	5	2	49	22	+27	2	46	Promotion Playoffs
3	Dorados de Sinaloa	20	13	3	4	43	20	+23	3	45	Reserve Teams Playoffs
4	Diablos Azules de Guasave	20	10	5	5	47	27	+20	2	37	
5	Titanes de Nogales	20	9	6	5	48	22	+26	2	35	
6	Guerreros de Obregón	20	5	7	8	22	32	−10	4	26	
7	Guerreros Pericúes	20	5	5	10	27	47	−20	2	22	
8	Héroes de Caborca	20	4	5	11	24	42	−18	3	20	
9	Pelicanos de Puerto Peñasco	20	5	4	11	29	59	−30	1	20	
10	Tijuana	20	4	4	12	33	43	−10	1	17	
11	Cimarrones de Sonora	20	4	1	15	22	53	−31	1	14	

Source: 3a División

=== Final stage ===
==== Third round ====
Team 1	Agg.	Team 2	1st leg	2nd leg
Atlético Culiacán	2–6	Águilas UAS	1–1	1–5

13 May 2017	Águilas UAS	1–1	Atlético Culiacán	Culiacán, Sinaloa
19:00	León 51'	Report	Pereida 32'	Stadium: Estadio Universitario UAS; Attendance: 500; Referee: Ismael Rosario López Peñuelas

20 May 2017	Atlético Culiacán	1–5 (2–6 agg.)	Águilas UAS	Costa Rica, Sinaloa
19:00	Juan Martínez 77'	Report	Jesús Martínez 2'; Caldera 5'; Torres 35', 57'; Adrián 67'	Stadium: Estadio Antonio Rosales; Attendance: 1,500; Referee: Mitzael Steve Bojorquez Montaño

- Group champion: Águilas UAS. Advance to Inter-groups stage.

== Group 14 ==
Group with 8 teams from Chihuahua, Coahuila and Durango.

=== Teams ===
Location of teams in the 2017–18 3ra División Group 13

Team	City	Home ground	Capacity	Affiliate	Official name
Chinarras de Aldama	Aldama, Chihuahua	Ciudad Deportiva Chihuahua	4,000	–	–
Cobras Fut Premier	Ciudad Juárez, Chihuahua	20 de Noviembre	2,500	–	–
Constructores de Gómez Palacio	Gómez Palacio, Durango	Unidad Deportiva Francisco Gómez Palacio	4,000	–	–
Dorados de Villa	Durango City, Durango	Francisco Zarco	18,000	–	FC Toros
La Tribu de Ciudad Juárez	Ciudad Juárez, Chihuahua	20 de Noviembre	2,500	–	–
Meloneros de Matamoros	Matamoros, Coahuila	Olímpico de Matamoros	3,000	–	–
Soles de Ciudad Juárez	Ciudad Juárez, Chihuahua	20 de Noviembre	2,500	–	–
UACH	Chihuahua City, Chihuahua	Olímpico Universitario José Reyes Baeza	22,000	UACH	–

=== League table ===
Pos	Team	Pld	W	D	L	GF	GA	GD	BP	Pts	Qualification or relegation
1	Soles de Ciudad Juárez	14	11	1	2	44	14	+30	0	34	Promotion Playoffs
2	Constructores de Gómez Palacio	14	7	5	2	31	16	+15	1	27	Promotion Playoffs
3	Cobras Fut Premier	14	7	3	4	20	12	+8	3	27	
4	UACH	14	7	3	4	22	12	+10	2	26	
5	La Tribu de Ciudad Juárez	14	6	5	3	17	7	+10	2	25	
6	Dorados de Villa	14	4	3	7	19	26	−7	1	16	
7	Meloneros de Matamoros	14	2	4	8	10	33	−23	3	13	
8	Chinarras de Aldama	14	0	0	14	14	57	−43	0	0	

Source: 3a División

=== Final stage ===
==== Third round ====
Team 1	Agg.	Team 2	1st leg	2nd leg
Soles de Ciudad Juárez (p.)	3–3 (5–4)	Constructores de Gómez Palacio	1–1	2–2

13 May 2017	Constructores de Gómez Palacio	1–1	Soles de Ciudad Juárez	Gómez Palacio, Durango
16:00	Tovar 74'	Report	Vázquez 29'	Stadium: Unidad Deportiva Francisco Gómez Palacio; Attendance: 250; Referee: Jorge Alejandro Martínez Loya

20 May 2017	Soles de Ciudad Juárez	2–2 (3-3 agg.) (5–4 p)	Constructores de Gómez Palacio	Ciudad Juárez, Chihuahua
16:00	Tovar 57' (own); Balderas 75'	Report	Montoya 11'; Tovar 39'	Stadium: Estadio 20 de Noviembre; Attendance: 500; Referee: Diego Armando Rosales Palacios

- Group champion: Soles de Ciudad Juárez. Advance to Inter-groups stage.

== Promotion play-offs ==
=== Inter-groups stage ===
Team 1	Agg.	Team 2	1st leg	2nd leg
Cruz Azul Lagunas	2–4	Cantera Venados	1–3	1–1
Sporting Canamy (p.)	1–1 (3–1)	Albinegros de Orizaba	1–1	0–0
Alpha	3–2	Histeria	0–2	3–0
Atlético Valladolid	2–3	Pachuca	2–2	0–1
Mineros de Fresnillo	5–4	Charales de Chapala	1–1	4–3
Tecos	7–1	Saltillo Soccer	4–0	3–1
Soles de Ciudad Juárez	2–5	Águila UAS	0–4	2–1

==== First leg ====
24 May 2017	Pachuca	2–2	Atlético Valladolid	Pachuca, Hidalgo
11:00	Figuera 25'; Flores 53'	Report	Coronado 38'; Gaona 86'	Stadium: Estadio Hidalgo; Attendance: 200; Referee: Alfredo Medina Mendoza

24 May 2017	Albinegros de Orizaba	1–1	Sporting Canamy	Orizaba, Veracruz
13:00	Flores 60'	Report	Torres 79'	Stadium: Estadio Socum; Attendance: 700; Referee: Luis Alberto Mattern García

24 May 2017	Histeria	2–0	Alpha	Metepec, State of Mexico
15:00	Martínez 9'; Blancas 17'	Report		Stadium: Estadio El Mirador; Attendance: 500; Referee: Luis Jonathan Vásquez Trujillo

24 May 2017	Cantera Venados	3–1	Cruz Azul Lagunas	Mérida, Yucatán
17:45	Moreno 52'; Salazar 64'; Rosado 83'	Report	Navarrete 76'	Stadium: Estadio Carlos Iturralde; Attendance: 1,150; Referee: Carlos Eduardo Zurita Romero

24 May 2017	Charales de Chapala	1–1	Mineros de Fresnillo	Chapala, Jalisco
19:00	Flores 52'	Report	Ramos 42'	Stadium: Estadio Municipal Juan Rayo; Attendance: 1,000; Referee: Martín Navarro Ortega

24 May 2017	Saltillo Soccer	0–4	Tecos	Saltillo, Coahuila
19:00		Report	Alonso 4'; Mares 17', 29'; Carbajal 90'	Stadium: Estadio Olímpico Francisco I. Madero; Attendance: 1,200; Referee: Mario Alberto Loredo Bocardo

24 May 2017	Águilas UAS	4–0	Soles de Ciudad Juárez	Culiacán, Sinaloa
19:00	Jiménez 26'; Adrián 38'; Torres 50'; Martínez 68'	Report		Stadium: Estadio Universitario UAS; Attendance: 400; Referee: Javier Alejandro Méndez Bizarrón

==== Second leg ====
27 May 2017	Sporting Canamy	0–0 (1–1 agg.) (3–1 p)	Albinegros de Orizaba	Xochimilco, Mexico City
11:00		Report		Stadium: Estadio Valentín González; Attendance: 200; Referee: Jesús Omar Cárdenas Gómez

27 May 2017	Alpha	3–0 (3–2 agg.)	Histeria	Puebla City, Puebla
12:00	Pomposo 14', 36', 72'	Report		Stadium: Club Alpha 3 Attendance: 250; Referee: Mario Terrazas Chávez

27 May 2017	Atlético Valladolid	0–1 (2–3 agg.)	Pachuca	Morelia, Michoacán
12:00		Report	Padilla 75'	Stadium: Estadio Venustiano Carranza; Attendance: 1,000; Referee: Harold Rodríguez Pérez

27 May 2017	Cruz Azul Lagunas	1–1 (2–4 agg.)	Venados	Lagunas, Oaxaca
15:00	Rivera 3'	Report	Ramírez 39'	Stadium: Estadio Cruz Azul; Attendance: 400; Referee: Wilfrido de la Cruz Pacheco

27 May 2017	Soles de Ciudad Juárez	2–1 (2–5 agg.)	Águilas UAS	Ciudad Juárez, Chihuahua
16:00	Gardillo 35'; Guerrero 68'	Report	Martínez 37'	Stadium: Estadio 20 de Noviembre; Attendance: 600; Referee: José Luis Luna Ramírez

27 May 2017	Mineros de Fresnillo	4–3 (5–4 agg.)	Charales de Chapala	Fresnillo, Zacatecas
19:00	Ramos 48'; Navor 59', 62'; Martínez 76'	Report	López 31'; García 45'; Cano 71'	Stadium: Unidad Deportiva Minera Fresnillo; Attendance: 700; Referee: Cristian Leopoldo Ruiz Tachiquin

27 May 2017	Tecos	3–1 (7–1 agg.)	Saltillo Soccer	Zapopan, Jalisco
19:00	Mares 62'; Ruvalcaba 65'; Palomino 74'	Report	Medina 46'	Stadium: Estadio Tres de Marzo; Attendance: 3,057; Referee: Joaquín Alberto Vizcarra Armenta

=== Championship stage ===
Quarter-finals
1	Sporting Canamy
Direct pass
3	Mineros de Fresnillo	1 (3)
6	Águilas UAS (p.)	1 (5)
2	Tecos	6
7	Cantera Venados	2
4	Pachuca	4
5	Alpha	1

Semi-finals
1	Sporting Canamy	7
6	Águilas UAS	0
2	Tecos	4
4	Pachuca	2

Final
1	Sporting Canamy	0
2	Tecos (w.)	3

==== Quarter-finals ====
30 May 2017	Mineros de Fresnillo	1–1 (3–5 p)	Águilas UAS	Toluca, State of Mexico
11:00	Hernández 10'	Report	Caldera 87'	Stadium: Instalaciones de la FMF – Cancha 1 Attendance: 50; Referee: Jesús Omar Cárdenas Gómez

30 May 2017	Pachuca	4–1	Alpha	Toluca, State of Mexico
11:00	Padilla 5', 39'; Rodelo 73'; León 85'	Report	Aguilar 36'	Stadium: Instalaciones de la FMF – Cancha 2 Attendance: 100; Referee: Juan José Gutiérrez León

30 May 2017	Tecos	6–2	Cantera Venados	Toluca, State of Mexico
11:00	Suárez 3', 56', 71'; Ruvalcaba 61'; Mares 77'; Chávez 78'	Report	Ramírez 34', 40'	Stadium: Instalaciones de la FMF – Cancha 3 Attendance: 100; Referee: Ismael Rosario López Peñuelas

==== Semi-finals ====
1 June 2017	Sporting Canamy	7–0	Águilas UAS	Toluca, State of Mexico
12:00	Espinoza 3', 33'; Ortíz 10'; Torres 45', 81'; García 59'; Cruz 70'	Report		Stadium: Instalaciones de la FMF – Cancha 2 Attendance: 200; Referee: Mario Terrazas Chávez

1 June 2017	Tecos	4–2	Pachuca	Toluca, State of Mexico
12:00	Suárez 2', 67'; Chávez 11'; García 81'	Report	Herrera 18'; Quintero 32'	Stadium: Instalaciones de la FMF – Cancha 1 Attendance: 250; Referee: Joaquín Alberto Vizcarra Armenta

==== Final ====
4 June 2017	Sporting Canamy	0–3	Tecos	Toluca, State of Mexico
12:00		Report		Stadium: Instalaciones de la FMF – Cancha 1 Attendance: 1,000; Referee: Joaquín Alberto Vizcarra Armenta

2016–17 winners

2nd title

== Reserve Teams ==
=== Table ===
P	Team	Pts	G	Pts/G	GD
1	Dorados de Sinaloa	45	20	2.25	23
2	Mineros de Zacatecas	74	34	2.18	49
3	Guadalajara	73	34	2.15	66
4	Leones Negros UdeG	73	34	2.15	34
5	Alebrijes de Oaxaca	72	34	2.12	36
6	Tigres SD	56	28	2.00	21
7	Pumas UNAM	70	36	1.94	53
8	Cafetaleros de Tapachula	69	36	1.92	52
9	UACH	26	14	1.86	10
10	Universidad del Fútbol	63	36	1.75	16
11	Atlante	39	24	1.63	10
12	Celaya	40	26	1.54	0
13	Coras	50	34	1.47	8
14	Nuevos Valores de Ocotlán	55	38	1.45	0
15	Escuela de Fútbol Chivas	54	38	1.42	3
16	Correcaminos UAT	38	28	1.36	–9
17	Tijuana	17	20	0.85	–10
18	Cimarrones de Sonora	14	20	0.70	–31

Last updated: April 30, 2017
Source: Liga TDP
P = Position; G = Games played; Pts = Points; Pts/G = Ratio of points to games played; GD = Goal difference

=== Play-offs ===
Quarter-finals
1	Dorados de Sinaloa	1	3	4
8	Cafetaleros de Chiapas	0	0	0
4	Leones Negros UdeG	2	5	7
5	Alebrijes de Oaxaca	0	1	1
2	Mineros de Zacatecas	3	2	5
7	Pumas UNAM	0	3	3
3	Guadalajara	2	3	5
6	Tigres SD	0	2	2

Semi-finals
1	Dorados de Sinaloa (p.)	1	1	2 (4)
4	Leones Negros UdeG	2	0	2 (3)
2	Mineros de Zacatecas	1	3	4
3	Guadalajara	2	5	7

Final
1	Dorados de Sinaloa	0	0	0
3	Guadalajara	4	0	4

== See also ==
- Tercera División de México
