= Luis López (footballer, born 1992) =

Mexican footballer

Personal information
- Full name: Luis Fernando López Figueroa
- Date of birth: 26 January 1992 (age 34)
- Place of birth: Ahome, Mexico
- Height: 1.75 m (5 ft 9 in)
- Position: Midfielder

Youth career
- Necaxa

Senior career*
Years	Team	Apps	(Gls)
2009–2014	Necaxa	40	(8)
2009–2010	→ Inter de Tehuacán (loan)	33	(11)
2010–2012	→ Cruz Azul (loan)	0	(0)
2014	Cimarrones de Sonora	5	(0)
2015–2016	Santos de Soledad	36	(7)
2016–2017	AEM	12	(1)
- * Club domestic league appearances and goals

Luis Fernando López Figueroa (born 26 January 1992) is a Mexican footballer who plays as a midfielder. He is currently a free agent.

== Career ==
Necaxa were López's first club, he featured for their youth academy for a number of years prior to making the jump into first-team football. In 2009, López was loaned to Inter de Tehuacán of Serie B. He made his debut on 6 September against Gallos Blancos, prior to scoring his first goal three appearances later versus Estudiantes Tecos. In total, he made thirty-three appearances and scored eleven goals for Inter de Tehuacán. 2010 saw López join Cruz Azul on loan for two seasons, though he subsequently only featured for the club's U20 team. He returned to Necaxa for the 2012–13 Ascenso MX season.

He made his professional football bow on 1 September 2012 versus Cachorros U. de G. He stayed with Necaxa for two further years, scoring eight times in forty-three fixtures in all competitions. He left the club in 2014 and had subsequent spells with Cimarrones de Sonora and Santos de Soledad between 2014 and 2016. Ahead of the 2016–17 campaign, López joined Tercera División de México side AEM. One goal in twelve appearances followed.

== Career statistics ==
As of 18 May 2018.

Club statistics
Club	Season	League			Cup (Note: Includes the Copa MX)		League Cup		Continental (Note: Includes the CONCACAF Champions League)		Other		Total	
Club	Season	Division	Apps	Goals	Apps	Goals	Apps	Goals	Apps	Goals	Apps	Goals	Apps	Goals
Necaxa	2009–10	Liga MX	0	0	0	0	—		—		0	0	0	0
Necaxa	2010–11	Liga MX	0	0	0	0	—		—		0	0	0	0
Necaxa	2011–12	Ascenso MX	0	0	0	0	—		—		0	0	0	0
Necaxa	2012–13	Ascenso MX	20	0	0	0	—		—		0	0	20	0
Necaxa	2013–14	Ascenso MX	20	8	3	0	—		—		0	0	23	8
Necaxa	Total		40	8	3	0	—		—		0	0	43	8
Inter de Tehuacán (loan)	2009–10	Serie B	33	11	0	0	—		—		0	0	33	11
Cruz Azul (loan)	2010–11	Liga MX	0	0	0	0	—		0	0	0	0	0	0
Cruz Azul (loan)	2011–12	Liga MX	0	0	0	0	—		—		0	0	0	0
Cruz Azul (loan)	Total		0	0	0	0	—		0	0	0	0	0	0
Cimarrones de Sonora	2014–15	Liga Premier	5	0	0	0	—		—		0	0	5	0
Santos de Soledad	2014–15	Serie A	9	3	0	0	—		—		0	0	9	3
Santos de Soledad	2015–16	Serie A	27	4	0	0	—		—		0	0	27	4
Santos de Soledad	Total		36	7	0	0	—		—		0	0	36	7
AEM	2016–17	Tercera División	12	1	0	0	—		—		0	0	12	1
Career total			126	27	3	0	—		0	0	0	0	129	27
