= Unidad Deportiva 21 de Marzo =

Multi-use stadium in Soledad de Graciano Sánchez, Mexico

The Unidad Deportiva 21 de Marzo is a multi-use stadium in Soledad de Graciano Sánchez, San Luis Potosí, Mexico. It is currently used mostly for football matches and is the home stadium for Santos de Soledad. The stadium has a capacity of 7,000 people.
