= Luis Fernando López (disambiguation) =

Luis Fernando López (born 1964) is a Bolivian politician and military officer.

Luis Fernando López may also refer to:

- Luis Fernando López (racewalker) (born 1979), Colombian racewalker
- Luis Fernando López Figueroa, (born 1992), Mexican footballer
- Luis Fernando López Payan, (born 1999), Mexican footballer

== Fictional characters ==
- Luis Fernando Lopez (character), protagonist of Grand Theft Auto: The Ballad of Gay Tony
