= Águilas UAGro =

- Full name: Club Deportivo Águilas de la Universidad Autónoma de Guerrero
- Nickname: Las Águilas (The Eagles)
- Founded: 2015
- Ground: Estadio de la UAGro, Chilpancingo, Guerrero
- Capacity: 2,000
- Owner: UAGro
- Chairman: Javier Saldaña Almazán
- Manager: Bulmaro González
- League: Tercera División de México
- 2020–21: 2nd – Group VI (round of 16)
Home colours	Away colours

Club Deportivo Águilas de la Universidad Autónoma de Guerrero is a Mexican football club that plays in the Tercera División de México. The club is based in Chilpancingo, Guerrero and was founded in 2015.

== History ==
The team was founded in 2015. In its first season, the team played under the name Vikingos de Chalco and finished as the best team in group 6. However, the club would only reach the round of 32, where it was eliminated by Tigrillos Dorados MRCI. Before the start of the 2016–17 season the team achieved its own official club registration and was able to compete under its real name.

In 2019 the team was relocated to Acapulco due to remodeling works in its original stadium, a year later the team settled permanently in the city. In 2023 the team returned to Chilpancingo due to the effects of Hurricane Otis in Acapulco, finally in February 2024 it returned to play in its original stadium.

== Stadium ==
Unidad Deportiva Acapulco (English:Acapulco Sports Complex) is a sports complex composed of a 13,000-seat soccer and track and field stadium and a baseball stadium which can seat thousands.

== Rivalry ==
Águilas UAGro has an important rivalry with the C.D. Avispones de Chilpancingo, team representative of the City of Chilpancingo, the match is known as the Clásico Guerrerense.

== Players ==
=== First-team squad ===
As of 15 April 2021

Note: Flags indicate national team as defined under FIFA eligibility rules; some limited exceptions apply. Players may hold more than one non-FIFA nationality.

No.	Pos.	Nation	Player
1	GK	MEX	Jardel Peñaloza
2	DF	MEX	Andrés Acevedo
3	DF	MEX	Isaác León
4	DF	MEX	Carlos Parra
5	DF	MEX	Pablo Román
6	DF	MEX	Ronaldo Santos
7	FW	MEX	Jesús Dávila
8	MF	MEX	Fernando Oliveros
9	MF	MEX	Alejandro Centell
10	MF	MEX	Cristian García
11	FW	MEX	Axel Zamacona
12	DF	MEX	Ernesto Romero
13	MF	MEX	Irvin de la O
14	MF	MEX	Martín Romero
15	DF	MEX	Luis Serrano
17	FW	MEX	Alejandro Pineda

No.	Pos.	Nation	Player
18	MF	MEX	Daniel Menera
19	FW	MEX	Josué Mejía
20	MF	MEX	Alexis Torres
21	FW	MEX	Diego Allende
22	FW	MEX	José Horta
23	DF	MEX	Carlos Fernández
24	MF	MEX	José Diego
27	GK	MEX	José Acevedo
28	MF	MEX	Adalid Murga
31	GK	MEX	Kevin Solís
36	MF	MEX	José Arciniega
37	FW	MEX	Josué López
44	MF	MEX	Adán Blancas
49	FW	MEX	Oliver Rojas
50	MF	MEX	Juan Campos

== See also ==
- Football in Mexico
- Tercera División de México
