= Deportivo Tepic F.C. Premier =

Football Club

Tepic Premier
- Full name: Deportivo Tepic JAP Fútbol Club Premier
- Nicknames: Los Coras (The Coras); El Equipo del Pueblo (The People's Team); El Tornado del País (The Tornado of the Country)
- Founded: 2014; 12 years ago
- Dissolved: 2016; 10 years ago
- Ground: Estadio Olímpico Santa Teresita; Tepic, Nayarit, Mexico
- Capacity: 4,000
Home colours	Away colours	Third colours

Deportivo Tepic JAP Fútbol Club Premier play in the Segunda División in Tepic, Nayarit, Mexico and are the official reserve team for Deportivo Tepic F.C. The games are held in the city of Tepic in the Estadio Olímpico Santa Teresita.
