= Kevin Favela =

Mexican footballer (born 1991)

Personal information
- Full name: Kevin Favela Gómez
- Date of birth: 19 July 1991 (age 35)
- Place of birth: Mexico City, Mexico
- Height: 1.78 m (5 ft 10 in)
- Position: Forward

Senior career*
Years	Team	Apps	(Gls)
2009–2010	Orizaba	28	(6)
2010–2011	Irapuato	9	(3)
2011–2012	La Piedad	17	(4)
2012–2013	Veracruz	4	(0)
2012–2013	→ Lobos BUAP (loan)	1	(0)
2015–2019	Celaya	21	(4)
- * Club domestic league appearances and goals

Kevin Favela Gómez (born July 19, 1991, in Mexico City) is a professional Mexican footballer who currently plays for Club Celaya
