= Costa Rica, Sinaloa =

Town in Sinaloa, Mexico

Coordinates: 24°5′8″N 107°3′8″W

Costa Rica is a town located about 30 minutes (by car) south of Culiacán, Sinaloa, Mexico.
