= Atlético Estado de México =

Mexican football club

- Full name: Atlético Estado de México Fútbol Club
- Nickname: Los Mexiquenses (The Mexiquenses)
- Founded: 2015; 11 years ago
- Ground: Canchas Titanium, Ecatepec, State of Mexico, Mexico
- Capacity: 1,000
- Chairman: Miguel Ángel Rogel
- Manager: Arturo Chimal
- League: Tercera División de México - Group IV
- 2020–21: 15th – Group IV
| Home colours | Away colours | Third colours |

The A.E.M. Fútbol Club, commonly known as A.E.M., is a Mexican football club based in State of Mexico. The club was founded in 2015, and currently plays in the Tercera División de México.
