= Santos de Soledad =

Mexican football club

- Full name: Santos de Soledad Fútbol Club
- Nickname: Los Santos (The Saints)
- Founded: 2013; 13 years ago
- Dissolved: 2017; 9 years ago
- Ground: Estadio Plan de San Luis; Soledad, San Luis Potosí
- Capacity: 20,000
Home colours	Away colours	Third colours

Santos de Soledad Fútbol Club, commonly known as Santos, was a Mexican football club based in Soledad, San Luis Potosí. The club was founded in 2013, and played in the Liga Premier de Ascenso of the Segunda División de México.

== History ==
The club was founded in 2013, at first it was planned as a reserve team of Atlético San Luis, however, finally the movement did not materialize, although, due to administrative issues the team competed under the name of Atlético San Luis B. In the 2013–14 season, the team reached the finals of the Apertura and Clausura tournaments, losing both series, one to Pioneros de Cancún and the other to Selva Cañera.

In 2014, the club bought the franchise belonging to Bravos de Nuevo Laredo relocating it to the city of Soledad, for which it was promoted to the Liga Premier de Ascenso. In addition, after this move, the team was officially called Santos de Soledad.

In 2016, the team was moved to the Estadio Plan de San Luis and was unofficially named Santos de San Luis, this to try to become the main team in the region, because Atlético San Luis was on hiatus during the season. In 2017, the Santos de Soledad franchise was dissolved.
