= Estadio Olímpico Santa Teresita =

Multi-use stadium in Tepic, Nayarit, Mexico

- Interactive map of Estadio Olímpico Santa Teresita
- Location: Tepic, Nayarit, Mexico
- Coordinates: 21°31′35″N 104°54′2″W
- Capacity: 4,000
- Surface: Grass

Construction
- Opened: 27 April 2014

Tenant
- Coras F.C. (2021–2023)

The Estadio Olímpico Santa Teresita is a multi-use stadium located in Tepic, Nayarit, Mexico. It is currently used mostly for football matches and was the home stadium for Coras F.C. The stadium has a capacity of 4,000 people.
