= Soledad de Graciano Sánchez =

City and municipality in San Luis Potosí, Mexico

Coordinates: 22°11′N 100°56′W

Soledad de Graciano Sanchez Soledad
- City and municipality
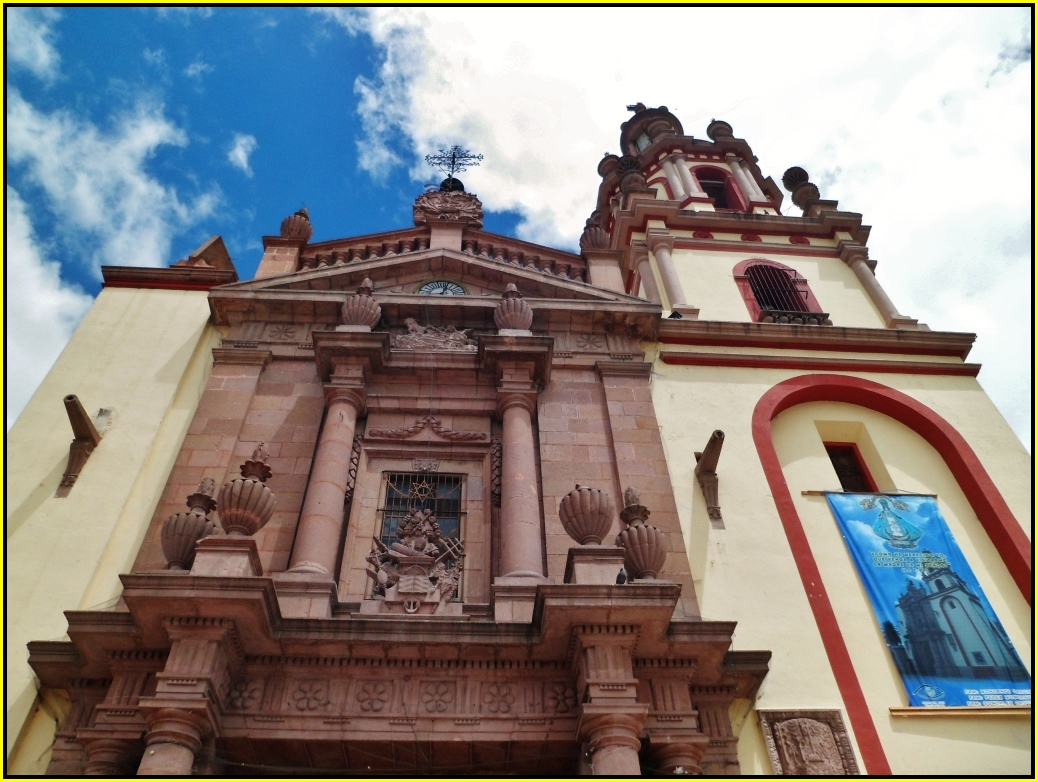
- Church of Nuestra Señora de la Soledad

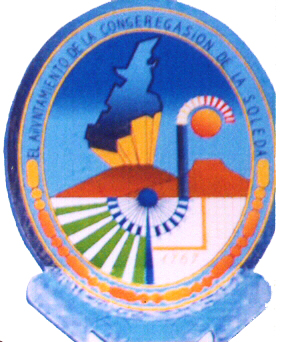
- Coat of arms
- Interactive map of Soledad de Graciano Sanchez
- Country: Mexico
- State: San Luis Potosí

Area
  - Municipality: 305.7 km^{2} (118.0 sq mi)
- Elevation: 1,849 m (6,066 ft)

Population (2020)
  - Municipality: 332,072
  - Density: 1,086.3/km^{2} (2,814/sq mi)
  - Metro: 1,271,366
- Time zone: UTC-6 (Zona Centro)
- ZIP code: 78400

Soledad de Graciano Sánchez, formerly Soledad Diez Gutiérrez, is the second-largest city of the state of San Luis Potosí in Mexico. It lies adjacent to the east side of the state's capital city of San Luis Potosí in the west-central part of the state. The city is the municipal seat of the municipality of the same name. The city had a 2020 Census population of 310,192, while the municipality's population was 332,072. The municipality has an area of 305.7 square kilometres (118.0 sq mi).

== History ==
The municipality of Soledad de Graciano Sanchez is located in the state of San Luis Potosí, Mexico. The current territory of the municipality of Soledad was occupied during the pre-Hispanic era by hunter groups known as the Guachichil. Originally founded as Los Ranchos, locals built a hermitage to venerate the Virgen de la Soledad. The place was renamed Ranchos de Nuestra Señora de la Soledad in 1758 and then Villa de la Soledad in 1827.

== Economy ==
There are a total of 51,637 households in Soledad de Graciano Sanchez. Of these homes, 51,175 are normal houses or apartments.

Population percentage (over 12 years) economically active: 56.51% (73.11% of men and 40.90% of women were working or looking for work)

Percentage of the active population that is employed: 94.05% (92.86% of men and 96.03% of economically active women are employed)

== Culture ==
=== Food ===
The most common local dish is enchiladas potosinas.

== Geography ==
The municipality of Soledad de Graciano Sánchez it represents 0.41% of the surface of its state (San Luis Potosí).

=== Climate ===
Summers in Soledad de Graciano Sanchez are short and hot, the winters are short, cool and dry it is partly cloudy throughout the year. During the summer which are the months of May through July are the hottest days in this town. Throughout the year the temperature varies from 5 °C to 29 °C and rarely drops below 1 °C or rises above 33 °C. The average percentage of the sky covered with clouds varies considerably during the course of the year. The wet season lasts 4.3 months from May 25 to October 3, with a probability of more than 21% that a certain day will be a wet day.

== Sister cities ==
- Sister city: Burlington, North Carolina, USA
