= 2018–19 Liga Premier de México season =

Liga Premier de México
- Season: 2018–19
- Dates: 24 August 2018 – 19 May 2019
- Champions: Serie A: Loros UdeC (3rd title); Serie B: Cañoneros Marina (1st title)
- Matches: 720
- Goals: 1,957 (2.72 per match)
- Top goalscorer: Serie A: Víctor Mañón (23 goals); Serie B: Illian Hernández (32 goals)
- Biggest home win: Serie A: Loros UdeC 11–0 Cimarrones (16 February 2019); Serie B: Celaya F.C. 9–0 Sahuayo (10 March 2019)
- Biggest away win: Serie A: Cimarrones 0–4 Tecos (10 November 2018); Serie B: Sahuayo 1–9 CAFESSA (2 March 2019)
- Highest scoring: Serie A:: Irapuato (69 points); Serie B: Mineros de Zacatecas (69 points)
- Highest attendance: Serie A:18,000; Irapuato vs Orizaba (20 April 2019); Serie B:3,800; Atlético Saltillo vs Calor (19 April 2019)
- Lowest attendance: Serie A:0; Coras de Nayarit vs Guadalajara (21 September 2018); Serie B:10; Potosino vs Chimalhuacán (10 November 2018)
- Total attendance: Serie A: 457,869; Serie B: 81,219
- Average attendance: Serie A: 954; Serie B: 355
- Stats are from the regular season only

The 2018–19 Liga Premier de México season is divided into two divisions named Serie A and Serie B. Liga Premier is the third-tier and fourth-tier football league of Mexico. The tournament began on 24 August 2018.

== Serie A ==
=== Changes from the previous season ===
The league went on to play in a tournament per season, playing 30 games per club. Followed by the eliminatory phase between the eight best classified to determine the champion of each division.

32 teams will be participate in this season:

- Murciélagos F.C. it was relegated from Ascenso MX.
- Twelve reserve teams of Liga MX clubs stopped participating in Serie A.
- Six teams participating in Serie B were invited to play in Serie A to compensate for the departure of Liga MX clubs reserve teams: Albinegros de Orizaba; Cimarrones de Sonora Premier; Cocodrilos de Tabasco; Correcaminos UAT Premier; Leones Negros UdeG Premier and Tuzos UAZ.
- Yalmakán F.C. was promoted from Serie B after a year to improve its infrastructure and was relocated from Puerto Morelos, Quintana Roo to Chetumal, Quintana Roo.
- Tlaxcala F.C. returns to Serie A after staying one year in Serie B while awaiting promotion to Ascenso MX, however, having failed to meet the requirements of Ascenso MX, the team returns to this category.
- Halcones de Morelos withdrew from the competition.
- Deportivo Tepic JAP was on one–year hiatus after having economic and administrative problems.
- Coras de Nayarit was created to replace Deportivo Tepic JAP. The team was created because Acatlán F.C., champion of the Third Division, moved from Acatlán de Juárez, Jalisco to Tepic, Nayarit. Because the team did not meet the league's sporting requirements in its original location.
- Loros UdeC and Tepatitlán de Morelos remains in Serie A after failing to meet the requirements to promote to Ascenso MX.
- As of February 2019, Pacific F.C. announced its relocation to Estadio Teodoro Mariscal in Mazatlán.
- For season second half, Dorados Fuerza UACH was renamed UACH F.C.

=== Stadiums and locations ===
==== Group 1 ====
Location of teams in the 2018–19 Serie A Group 1

Club	Manager	City	Stadium	Capacity	Affiliate
Alacranes de Durango	(Mexico) Ricardo González Peyro	Durango City, Durango	Francisco Zarco	18,000	—
Atlético Reynosa	(Mexico) Alejandro Pérez Macías	Reynosa, Tamaulipas	Unidad Deportiva Solidaridad	20,000	—
Cimarrones de Sonora	(Mexico) Mario López Aguilar	Hermosillo, Sonora	Miguel Castro Servín	4,000	Cimarrones de Sonora
Coras de Nayarit	(Mexico) Manuel Naya Barba	Tepic, Nayarit	Nicolás Álvarez Ortega	12,271	—
Gavilanes de Matamoros	(Mexico) Jorge Alberto Urbina	Matamoros, Tamaulipas	El Hogar	22,000	—
Guadalajara	(Mexico) Ricardo Cadena	Zapopan, Jalisco	Verde Valle	800	Guadalajara
Loros UdeC	(Mexico) Víctor Hugo Mora	Colima City, Colima	Olímpico Universitario de Colima	11,812	—
Leones Negros	(Mexico) Luis Felipe Peña	Ameca, Jalisco	Núcleo Deportivo y de E. Ameca	4,000	Leones Negros UdeG
Monarcas Morelia	(Mexico) Gastón Obledo	Morelia, Michoacán	Morelos practice field	1,000	Monarcas Morelia
Murciélagos	(Mexico) Daniel Alcántar	Los Mochis, Sinaloa	Centenario	11,134	—
Necaxa	(Mexico) Jorge Martínez Merino	Aguascalientes City, Aguascalientes	Victoria	23,851	Necaxa
Pacific	(Mexico) Adolfo García	Mazatlán, Sinaloa	Teodoro Mariscal	16,000	—
Tecos	(Chile) Rodrigo Ruiz	Zapopan, Jalisco	Tres de Marzo	18,779	—
Tepatitlán de Morelos	(Mexico) Enrique López Zarza	Tepatitlán, Jalisco	Gregorio "Tepa" Gómez	12,500	—
UACH	(Mexico) Diego López	Chihuahua City, Chihuahua	Olímpico Universitario José Reyes Baeza	22,000	—
UAT	(Mexico) Raúl Alberto Pérez	Ciudad Victoria, Tamaulipas	Marte R. Gómez	10,520	Correcaminos UAT

==== Group 2 ====
Location of teams in the 2018–19 Serie A Group 2

Club	Manager	City	Stadium	Capacity	Affiliate
Albinegros de Orizaba	(Mexico) Leoncio Huerta	Boca del Río, Veracruz	Luis "Pirata" Fuente	28,703	Tiburones Rojos de Veracruz
América	(Mexico) Pedro Vega	Tlalpan, Mexico City	Instalaciones Club América	1,000	América
Cocodrilos de Tabasco	(Mexico) Adrián García Arias	Villahermosa, Tabasco	Olímpico de Villahermosa	12,000	—
Cruz Azul Hidalgo	(Chile) Edgardo Fuentes	Ciudad Cooperativa Cruz Azul, Hidalgo	10 de Diciembre	7,761	Cruz Azul
Inter Playa del Carmen	(Mexico) Carlos Flores Espetia	Playa del Carmen, Quintana Roo	Unidad Deportiva Mario Villanueva Madrid	7,500	—
Irapuato	(Mexico) Carlos Bracamontes	Irapuato, Guanajuato	Sergio León Chávez	25,000	—
Pioneros de Cancún	(Mexico) Manuel Martínez	Cancún, Quintana Roo	Andrés Quintana Roo / Cancún 86	17,289 / 6,390	—
Real Zamora	(Mexico) Ulises Sánchez	Zamora, Michoacán	Zamora	7,200	—
Reboceros de La Piedad	(Mexico) Héctor Jair Real	La Piedad, Michoacán	Juan N. López	13,356	—
Sporting Canamy	(Mexico) Gerardo Durón	Oaxtepec, Morelos	Olímpico de Oaxtepec	9,000	—
Tlaxcala	(Canada) Isidro Sánchez Macip	Chiautempan, Tlaxcala	Unidad Deportiva Próspero Cahuantzi	2,500	—
Toluca	(Mexico) José Rodríguez Valenzuela	Metepec, State of Mexico	Instalaciones de Metepec	1,000	Toluca
Tuxtla	(Mexico) Ricardo Rayas	Tuxtla Gutiérrez, Chiapas	Víctor Manuel Reyna	29,001	—
Tuzos UAZ	(Mexico) Rubén Hernández	Zacatecas City, Zacatecas	Carlos Vega Villalba	20,068	—
UNAM	(Mexico) Carlos Humberto González	Coyoacán, Mexico City	La Cantera	2,000	UNAM
Yalmakán	(Argentina) Omar Tisera	Chetumal, Quintana Roo	José López Portillo	6,600	—

=== Regular season ===
==== Group 1 ====
===== Standings =====
Pos	Team	Pld	W	D	L	GF	GA	GD	BP	Pts	Qualification
1	Guadalajara	30	17	9	4	46	28	+18	4	64	Advance to Liguilla de Filiales
2	Loros UdeC (C)	30	17	6	7	72	32	+40	6	63	Advance to Liguilla
3	Tepatitlán	30	16	6	8	52	40	+12	2	56	Advance to Liguilla
4	Atlético Reynosa	30	14	9	7	42	23	+19	4	55	Advance to Liguilla
5	UACH	30	15	6	9	47	30	+17	4	55	Advance to Liguilla
6	Murciélagos	30	15	6	9	56	39	+17	3	54	
7	Necaxa	30	14	9	7	38	35	+3	3	54	Advance to Liguilla de Filiales
8	Coras de Nayarit	30	14	8	8	42	31	+11	2	52	
9	Gavilanes de Matamoros	30	13	8	9	41	33	+8	2	49	
10	UAT	30	10	7	13	38	47	−9	3	40	
11	Morelia	30	9	9	12	50	41	+9	1	37	
12	Tecos	30	7	8	15	40	49	−9	5	34	
13	Leones Negros	30	9	6	15	35	49	−14	1	34	
14	Alacranes de Durango	30	4	11	15	25	45	−20	1	24	
15	Pacific	30	4	9	17	32	71	−39	2	23	
16	Cimarrones de Sonora	30	2	3	25	27	82	−55	0	9	

Updated to match(es) played on April 20, 2019. Source: Sitio Oficial de la Liga Premier – Serie A
(C) Champions

===== Results =====
Home \ Away	DUR	ATR	CMS	COR	UAT	UCH	GAV	GDL	LNU	LUC	MOR	MUR	NEC	PCF	TEC	TPM
Durango		1–0	1–1	2–2	2–0	1–3	1–1	1–2	2–3	0–2	0–1	3–2	2–0	2–2	1–2	1–2
Atlético Reynosa	1–1		3–0	1–2	1–0	0–2	1–0	3–0	3–0	1–1	2–1	1–2	1–1	0–1	3–0	3–2
Cimarrones	1–1	0–2		1–2	0–2	0–1	1–1	0–1	0–1	1–3	3–1	3–4	0–2	1–4	0–4	0–1
Coras	1–0	0–0	2–0		1–0	0–0	2–2	1–0	0–0	0–0	1–0	1–1	0–2	4–1	3–0	4–2
UAT	3–1	1–1	3–0	1–0		1–4	2–0	0–2	2–0	0–2	1–0	1–3	0–3	2–0	1–2	2–0
UACH	1–0	0–0	1–0	3–1	0–0		1–2	3–0	3–1	3–0	0–2	1–0	1–0	7–0	2–1	1–1
Gavilanes	0–0	1–0	5–0	1–0	3–1	1–0		1–1	4–3	1–1	1–1	2–1	0–1	3–1	3–0	1–3
Guadalajara	2–0	2–1	5–1	2–1	4–1	0–0	2–1		2–1	1–1	1–1	1–0	1–1	2–2	2–0	1–1
Leones Negros	5–0	0–2	1–0	0–3	1–1	2–1	0–0	1–2		3–2	1–1	1–3	3–0	4–2	0–3	0–1
Loros UdeC	2–0	0–1	11–0	4–2	2–0	5–2	3–0	1–2	3–0		3–1	1–2	1–2	3–0	5–4	2–0
Monarcas Morelia	1–1	0–1	6–0	2–3	5–1	1–2	1–2	0–2	1–1	2–1		6–4	2–1	6–0	2–0	1–2
Murciélagos	2–0	1–1	3–0	0–1	2–2	3–0	3–0	0–1	0–1	1–1	4–2		2–1	4–1	2–1	0–0
Necaxa	1–1	1–1	3–4	1–0	0–0	1–0	2–1	1–1	1–0	2–5	1–1	2–1		1–0	2–1	2–1
Pacific	0–0	0–3	0–1	2–2	2–4	2–1	0–3	2–2	2–2	2–2	1–1	1–2	1–1		1–0	1–2
Tecos	0–0	2–2	3–1	0–1	3–3	2–2	0–1	0–1	3–0	0–2	0–0	2–2	1–1	2–1		2–2
Tepatitlán	2–0	1–3	4–0	3–2	3–3	3–2	1–0	2–1	2–0	0–3	1–1	1–2	2–0	4–0	3–2	

Updated to match(es) played on 21 April 2019. Source: Liga Premier de México, League calendar G1
Legend: Blue = home team win; Yellow = draw; Red = away team win.

===== Positions by round =====
Leader and qualification to playoffs
Qualification to Reserve teams playoffs
Last place in table
Qualification to playoffs

Team ╲ Round	1	2	3	4	5	6	7	8	9	10	11	12	13	14	15	16	17	18	19	20	21	22	23	24	25	26	27	28	29	30
Guadalajara	6	1	1	2	5	3	3	1	1	1	2	1	1	3	3	3	3	3	4	3	2	4	2	1	2	2	2	1	1	1
Loros UdeC	2	3	8	9	11	7	8	6	6	6	6	4	2	1	1	2	2	2	3	4	4	1	1	2	1	1	1	2	2	2
Tepatitlán	8	4	2	1	2	2	1	2	4	4	4	6	6	6	6	5	6	6	5	5	5	2	3	3	3	3	4	6	6	3
Reynosa	12	13	15	15	15	15	15	13	14	12	13	11	9	7	7	6	5	5	6	6	6	6	6	6	6	7	5	4	3	4
UACH	14	9	3	5	7	9	7	9	10	11	12	13	13	14	13	11	10	12	10	9	9	9	8	9	8	8	8	8	7	5
Murciélagos	13	12	6	4	1	1	2	5	3	2	1	2	5	2	2	1	1	1	1	1	1	3	4	5	5	4	3	3	4	6
Necaxa	15	15	12	11	12	11	10	8	5	5	7	5	4	5	4	4	4	4	2	2	3	5	5	4	4	5	7	5	5	7
Nayarit	7	8	14	7	4	4	5	4	7	8	8	7	7	8	8	7	8	8	7	7	8	8	7	8	7	6	6	7	8	8
Gavilanes	4	6	10	12	8	6	6	3	2	3	3	3	3	4	5	8	7	7	8	8	7	7	9	7	9	9	9	9	9	9
UAT	11	10	4	6	3	5	4	7	8	7	9	9	10	10	10	10	11	10	11	11	11	11	11	11	10	10	10	10	10	10
Morelia	1	2	7	8	9	10	12	11	9	9	5	8	8	9	9	9	9	9	9	10	10	10	10	10	11	11	11	11	11	11
Tecos	6	11	5	10	10	12	13	14	13	14	11	10	11	11	11	12	12	11	12	12	12	12	13	13	13	13	12	12	12	12
Leones Negros	3	7	13	13	13	13	11	10	11	10	10	12	12	12	12	13	13	13	13	13	14	13	12	12	12	12	13	13	13	13
Durango	8	14	11	14	14	14	14	15	15	15	14	14	14	15	15	15	15	15	14	14	13	14	14	14	14	14	14	14	14	14
Pacific	10	5	9	3	6	8	9	12	12	13	15	15	15	13	14	14	14	14	15	15	15	15	15	15	15	15	15	15	15	15
Cimarrones	16	16	16	16	16	16	16	16	16	16	16	16	16	16	16	16	16	16	16	16	16	16	16	16	16	16	16	16	16	16

Updated to match(es) played on 20 April 2019. Source: Liga Premier de México, League calendar G1

==== Group 2 ====
===== Standings =====
Pos	Team	Pld	W	D	L	GF	GA	GD	BP	Pts	Qualification
1	Irapuato	30	21	6	3	57	19	+38	4	73	Advance to Liguilla
2	Tuzos UAZ	30	14	10	6	46	34	+12	2	54	Advance to Liguilla
3	Tuxtla	30	14	8	8	45	28	+17	2	52	Advance to Liguilla
4	UNAM	30	14	7	9	47	34	+13	3	52	Advance to Liguilla de Filiales
5	Cruz Azul Hidalgo	30	13	7	10	37	30	+7	4	50	Advance to Liguilla
6	Real Zamora	30	14	5	11	44	38	+6	2	49	
7	Inter Playa del Carmen	30	13	8	9	35	30	+5	2	49	
8	Toluca	30	11	9	10	41	40	+1	2	44	Advance to Liguilla de Filiales
9	Reboceros de La Piedad	30	10	9	11	39	39	0	4	43	
10	Tlaxcala	30	9	13	8	39	34	+5	2	42	
11	Pioneros de Cancún	30	7	12	11	30	37	−7	2	35	
12	Albinegros de Orizaba	30	9	6	15	25	39	−14	1	34	
13	América	30	5	12	13	30	47	−17	2	29	
14	Cocodrilos de Tabasco	30	5	11	14	23	41	−18	3	29	
15	Sporting Canamy	30	7	7	16	31	57	−26	1	29	
16	Yalmakán	30	4	10	16	28	50	−22	2	24	

Updated to match(es) played on April 20, 2019. Source: Sitio Oficial de la Liga Premier – Serie A

===== Results =====
Home \ Away	ADO	AME	COT	CAH	IPC	IRA	LAP	PCN	RZA	SCA	TLA	TOL	TUX	UAZ	UNM	YAL
Albinegros		1–0	1–0	4–1	1–2	0–2	1–4	1–0	3–0	0–4	1–1	1–1	0–1	0–1	0–2	1–0
América	2–0		2–2	2–0	0–1	0–0	1–1	1–1	1–4	3–1	1–0	1–4	1–1	0–1	1–2	0–0
Cocodrilos	1–0	0–0		0–3	0–2	1–0	1–3	0–1	0–2	2–1	1–1	1–0	0–1	2–2	2–0	2–2
Cruz Azul Hidalgo	0–0	2–0	1–0		1–1	1–2	3–0	3–2	2–0	2–0	3–1	1–1	0–0	0–1	0–2	2–0
Inter Playa	3–1	2–0	0–0	2–1		0–0	3–1	1–3	2–1	0–1	1–1	1–0	1–2	0–1	2–1	2–0
Irapuato	4–1	5–0	1–0	1–0	3–0		2–1	1–0	3–0	3–1	3–0	1–0	2–0	3–0	1–1	2–0
La Piedad	1–0	3–3	2–2	2–0	2–0	2–3		1–1	1–2	1–1	1–0	0–1	0–3	2–2	1–1	4–1
Pioneros	0–1	2–2	1–1	0–2	0–0	0–1	2–0		3–2	1–1	1–2	2–0	0–0	2–2	0–0	0–3
Real Zamora	0–0	2–0	3–2	1–3	2–0	0–1	1–0	2–0		3–2	2–0	0–0	2–0	3–1	2–4	5–0
Sporting Canamy	1–1	1–2	1–1	0–0	3–2	1–3	1–3	0–1	1–1		0–1	1–0	0–2	1–1	4–3	1–0
Tlaxcala	1–1	1–1	5–0	1–1	1–1	2–2	1–2	1–2	0–0	1–0		1–1	3–0	2–2	1–0	2–1
Toluca	3–2	2–1	2–0	2–2	0–0	1–1	1–0	2–2	1–2	2–3	1–4		3–2	3–0	3–2	2–1
Tuxtla	3–0	1–1	2–1	2–0	1–1	0–2	0–0	1–1	3–0	5–0	1–2	1–0		4–1	1–1	4–1
Tuzos UAZ	0–1	3–1	0–0	3–1	1–2	3–2	0–0	1–0	2–0	5–0	1–1	4–1	1–0		2–0	3–1
UNAM	2–0	1–1	1–0	0–1	2–1	3–2	2–0	4–1	2–1	5–0	2–1	1–2	2–1	1–1		0–0
Yalmakán	0–2	3–2	1–1	0–2	0–2	1–1	0–1	1–1	1–1	3–0	1–1	2–2	2–3	1–1	2–0	

Updated to match(es) played on 20 April 2019. Source: Liga Premier de México, League calendar G2
Legend: Blue = home team win; Yellow = draw; Red = away team win.

===== Positions by round =====
Leader and qualification to playoffs
Qualification to Reserve teams playoffs
Last place in table
Qualification to playoffs

Team ╲ Round	1	2	3	4	5	6	7	8	9	10	11	12	13	14	15	16	17	18	19	20	21	22	23	24	25	26	27	28	29	30
Irapuato	4	3	1	1	1	1	1	1	1	1	1	1	1	1	1	1	1	1	1	1	1	1	1	1	1	1	1	1	1	1
Tuzos UAZ	8	9	6	8	6	5	6	6	5	4	3	5	6	5	5	7	5	5	4	4	3	3	4	4	5	4	4	2	2	2
Tuxtla	6	4	2	3	2	3	2	4	4	2	2	2	3	2	3	3	2	2	2	2	2	2	2	3	3	3	3	3	3	3
UNAM	5	6	5	7	5	7	7	8	7	9	9	11	8	7	7	4	7	6	6	6	5	4	3	2	2	2	2	4	4	4
Cruz Azul H.	3	2	4	5	8	6	5	5	6	5	5	3	2	3	2	2	3	3	3	3	4	7	7	8	6	6	6	5	5	5
Real Zamora	13	7	11	9	10	11	12	11	13	14	10	8	9	8	9	9	8	8	8	8	8	6	5	6	7	7	8	8	7	6
Inter Playa	12	13	9	4	4	3	3	2	3	6	6	4	5	4	4	5	6	7	7	7	6	8	8	7	8	8	7	6	6	7
Toluca	1	1	3	2	3	4	4	3	2	3	4	6	4	6	6	6	4	4	5	5	7	5	6	5	4	5	5	7	8	8
La Piedad	9	11	13	15	15	14	15	16	12	16	14	15	13	13	13	14	14	12	13	13	10	11	12	12	11	11	10	9	10	9
Tlaxcala	16	14	16	13	12	10	8	7	8	7	8	10	10	9	8	8	9	9	9	9	9	9	9	9	9	9	9	10	9	10
Pioneros	2	5	7	10	9	8	11	10	14	15	16	16	16	16	16	16	16	16	16	15	16	15	14	13	13	12	12	11	11	11
Albinegros	14	16	14	12	11	12	10	9	9	8	11	9	11	12	11	11	11	13	11	11	12	10	10	10	10	10	11	12	12	12
América	9	10	8	6	7	9	9	12	10	10	12	13	14	14	15	15	15	15	15	16	15	16	16	15	15	15	15	15	15	13
Cocodrilos	10	15	12	14	14	16	14	13	15	12	13	12	12	11	12	13	13	11	12	10	11	12	11	11	12	13	14	14	14	14
Canamy	7	8	10	11	13	15	16	15	16	13	7	7	7	10	10	10	10	10	10	12	14	14	13	14	14	14	13	13	13	15
Yalmakán	11	12	15	16	16	13	13	14	11	11	15	14	15	15	14	12	12	14	14	14	13	13	15	16	16	16	16	16	16	16

Updated to match(es) played on 20 April 2019. Source: Liga Premier de México, League calendar G2

=== Regular season statistics ===
==== Scoring ====
- First goal of the season:
  (Mexico) Alan Medina for Toluca Premier against América Premier (24 August 2018)

==== Top goalscorers ====
Players sorted first by goals scored, then by last name.

Rank	Player	Club	Goals
1	(Mexico) Víctor Mañón	Loros UdeC	23
2	(Mexico) Juan Carlos Martínez	Coras de Nayarit	19
3	(Mexico) Juan Carlos López	Tepatitlán	15
3	(Mexico) Humberto Guzmán	Tepatitlán	15
3	(Mexico) Bryan Lozano	UNAM	15
6	(Mexico) Josué Bustos	Gavilanes de Matamoros	14
6	(Mexico) Víctor Argumedo	Tuzos UAZ	14
8	(Mexico) Lenin Esquivel	Monarcas Morelia	13
8	(Mexico) Jesús Hernández	Tuzos UAZ	13
10	(Mexico) Daniel Delgadillo	Gavilanes de Matamoros	12

Source: Liga Premier

==== Hat-tricks and more goals ====
Player	For	Against	Result	Date	Round	Reference
(Mexico) Lenin Esquivel	Morelia	Cimarrones	6–0 (H)	25 August 2018	1	
(Mexico) Gustavo Guillén	Sporting Canamy	Inter Playa	3–2 (H)	13 October 2018	8	
(Mexico) Jonathan Quintero	Leones Negros	Durango	5–0 (H)	14 October 2018	8	
(Mexico) Brandon Chávez	Tecos	Cimarrones	0–4 (A)	10 November 2018	12	
(Mexico) Víctor Mañón	Loros UdeC	Tecos	5–4 (H)	1 December 2018	15	
(Mexico) Luis Valdéz	Durango	Murciélagos	3–2 (H)	1 February 2019	19	
(Mexico) Víctor Argumedo	Tuzos UAZ	Sporting Canamy	5–0 (H)	16 February 2019	21	
(Mexico) Jorge Almaguer	Loros UdeC	Cimarrones	11–0 (H)	16 February 2019	21	
(Mexico) Víctor Mañón	Loros UdeC	Cimarrones	11–0 (H)	16 February 2019	21	
(Mexico) Juan Carlos Martínez	Coras de Nayarit	Tepatitlán	4–2 (H)	15 March 2019	25	
(Mexico) José Chavez	Albinegros de Orizaba	Real Zamora	3-0 (H)	16 March 2019	25	
(Mexico) Jesús Silva	Cimarrones de Sonora	Necaxa	3-4 (A)	7 April 2019	28	
(Mexico) Jesús Hernández	Tuzos UAZ	Toluca	4-1 (H)	8 April 2019	28	

(H) – Home; (A) – Away

=== Attendance ===
==== Per team ====
Pos	Team	Total	High	Low	Average	Change
1	Irapuato	125,800	18,000	1,500	8,387	+743.8%
2	Gavilanes de Matamoros	65,800	12,500	1,500	4,387	+16.2%
3	Reboceros de La Piedad	30,363	7,000	100	2,024	−35.9%
4	Tepatitlán	25,000	5,000	300	1,667	−17.2%
5	Atlético Reynosa	24,550	4,000	300	1,637	+19.1%
6	Inter Playa del Carmen	20,800	4,500	200	1,387	+177.4%
7	Pioneros de Cancún	16,050	3,000	100	1,070	+40.6%
8	Tlaxcala	15,880	2,180	300	1,059	+81.6%^{1}
9	Loros UdeC	15,730	2,200	500	1,049	−2.1%
10	Murciélagos	14,900	3,000	300	993	−60.4%^{3}
11	Coras de Nayarit	14,650	3,800	0	977	+28.2%
12	Yalmakán	10,750	1,200	200	717	+210.4%^{2}
13	Alacranes de Durango	8,800	1,000	250	587	−20.6%
14	Tuxtla	8,600	1,100	200	573	−58.1%
15	Real Zamora	7,750	1,100	200	517	−27.3%
16	Pacific	6,900	1,500	100	460	+88.5%
17	Cocodrilos de Tabasco	5,700	1,100	50	380	−55.3%^{1}
18	UACH	5,150	1,000	100	343	+103.0%
19	Cruz Azul Hidalgo	4,272	500	200	285	+30.1%
20	Tecos	3,845	500	100	256	−32.8%
21	Tuzos UAZ	3,650	1,500	50	243	+127.1%^{1}
22	Albinegros de Orizaba	3,500	500	50	233	−33.4%^{1}
23	Leones Negros	2,950	650	50	197	+114.1%^{1}
24	UAT	2,650	400	100	177	+77.0%^{1}
25	Sporting Canamy	2,540	300	50	169	−18.4%
26	Cimarrones de Sonora	2,132	500	99	142	−9.6%^{1}
27	UNAM	1,901	200	75	127	−8.0%
28	Guadalajara	1,900	200	50	127	+2.4%
29	América	1,575	200	50	105	−11.8%
30	Necaxa	1,450	150	50	97	−18.5%
31	Toluca	1,271	200	20	85	+11.8%
32	Monarcas Morelia	1,060	100	50	71	−12.3%
	League total	457,869	18,000	0	954	+68.3%

Updated to games played on 21 April 2019
Source: Liga Premier FMF (available in each game report)
Notes:
Only regular season listed
1: Team played Serie B last season.
2: Team played Serie B last season, the local games were played in Puerto Morelos.
3: Team played Ascenso MX last season.

==== Highest and lowest ====
Highest attendance					Lowest attendance			
Week	Home	Score	Away	Attendance	Home	Score	Away	Attendance
1	Gavilanes de Matamoros	2–1	Murciélagos F.C.	4,500	UNAM	2–0	Albinegros de Orizaba	100
2	Atlético Reynosa	0–1	Pacific F.C.	4,000	Necaxa	1–1	Morelia	50
3	Irapuato	2–0	Yalmakán	8,000	UACH	3–1	Coras de Nayarit	100
4	Pioneros de Cancún	0–1	Albinegros de Orizaba	1,500	Guadalajara	0–0	UACH	50
5	Gavilanes de Matamoros	4–3	Leones Negros	4,300	Coras de Nayarit	1–0	Guadalajara	0
6	Atlético Reynosa	1–2	Coras de Nayarit	1,850	Sporting Canamy	1–1	Tuzos UAZ	50
7	Irapuato	3–1	Sporting Canamy	4,500	UNAM	0–1	Cruz Azul Hidalgo	75
8	Gavilanes de Matamoros	3–1	UAT	10,000	Sporting Canamy	3–2	Inter Playa	100
9	Atlético Reynosa	1–2	Murciélagos	1,500	Toluca	2–2	Cruz Azul Hidalgo	50
10	Gavilanes de Matamoros	0–0	Alacranes de Durango	3,000	Morelia	2–1	Loros UdeC	50
11	Atlético Reynosa	1–1	Necaxa	2,000	Albinegros de Orizaba	0–4	Sporting Canamy	50
12	Irapuato	1–1	UNAM	6,000	Morelia	2–3	Coras de Nayarit	50
13	Atlético Reynosa	3–0	Leones Negros	1,000	Toluca	3–0	Tuzos UAZ	50
14	Gavilanes de Matamoros	1–1	Guadalajara	12,500	Tuzos UAZ	1–0	Pioneros de Cancún	50
15	Atlético Reynosa	1–0	Gavilanes de Matamoros	4,000	Toluca	0–0	Inter Playa	50
16	Reboceros de La Piedad	2–2	Tuzos UAZ	3,000	Atlético Reynosa	1–0	UAT	0
17	Irapuato	2–1	Reboceros de La Piedad	8,000	Morelia	2–1	Necaxa	50
18	Tlaxcala	1–1	América	2,180	Necaxa	2–1	Gavilanes	50
19	Irapuato	1–0	Cruz Azul Hidalgo	7,000	Morelia	1–1	Leones Negros	50
20	Reboceros de La Piedad	1–1	UNAM	4,000	Necaxa	1–0	Pacific	50
21	Irapuato	3–0	Real Zamora	8,000	UNAM	0–0	Yalmakán	50
22	Gavilanes de Matamoros	3–0	Tecos	5,000	Morelia	5–1	UAT	50
23	Irapuato	3–0	Tuzos UAZ	12,000	América	1–4	Real Zamora	100
24	Irapuato	2–0	Tuxtla	10,000	Morelia	1–1	Durango	60
25	Atlético Reynosa	3-0	Cimarrones	2,000	Toluca	2-0	Cocodrilos de Tabasco	20
26	Irapuato	5–0	América	16,000	Necaxa	1–1	Atlético Reynosa	50
27	Coras de Nayarit	1–0	Morelia	3,800	Toluca	2–3	Sporting Canamy	50
28	Irapuato	4–1	Orizaba	15,000	Cocodrilos de Tabasco	1–3	La Piedad	50
29	Reboceros de La Piedad	1–2	Real Zamora	7,000	Necaxa	2–1	Tecos	50
30	Irapuato	1–0	Pioneros de Cancún	18,000	América	2–0	Orizaba	50

Source:Liga Premier FMF (available in each game report)

=== Liguilla de Ascenso (Promotion Playoffs) ===
The four best teams of each group play two games against each other on a home-and-away basis. The higher seeded teams play on their home field during the second leg. The winner of each match up is determined by aggregate score. In the quarterfinals and semifinals, if the two teams are tied on aggregate the higher seeded team advances. In the final, if the two teams are tied after both legs, the match goes to extra time and, if necessary, a penalty shoot-out.

Quarter-finals
2	Loros UdeC	3	2	5
7	Tuxtla	1	1	2
1	Irapuato	0	1	1
8	Cruz Azul Hidalgo (a)	0	1	1
4	Atlético Reynosa	2	1	3
5	UACH	2	0	2
3	Tepatitlán	1	2	3
6	Tuzos UAZ	2	2	4

Semi-finals
2	Loros UdeC	2	2	4
8	Cruz Azul Hidalgo	1	0	1
4	Atlético Reynosa	0	0	0
6	Tuzos UAZ	2	0	2

Final
2	Loros UdeC	0	3	3
6	Tuzos UAZ	2	0	2

==== Quarter-finals ====
The first legs will be played on 24 and 25 April, and the second legs will be played on 27 and 28 April 2019.

Team 1	Agg.	Team 2	1st leg	2nd leg
Irapuato	1–1	Cruz Azul Hidalgo (a)	0–0	1–1
Loros UdeC	5–2	Tuxtla	3–1	2–1
Tepatitlán	3–4	Tuzos UAZ	1–2	2–2
Atlético Reynosa	3–2	UACH	2–2	1–0

===== First leg =====
24 April 2019	Cruz Azul Hidalgo	0–0	Irapuato	Ciudad Cooperativa Cruz Azul
16:00		Report		Stadium: Estadio 10 de Diciembre; Attendance: 1,000; Referee: Martín Molina Astorga

24 April 2019	Tuxtla	1–3	Loros UdeC	Tuxtla Gutiérrez
16:00	Cruz 30'	Report	Mañón 34'; García 43'; Gracia 90+4'	Stadium: Estadio Víctor Manuel Reyna; Attendance: 2,000; Referee: Maximiliano Quintero Hernández

25 April 2019	Tuzos UAZ	2–1	Tepatitlán	Zacatecas
17:00	Argumedo 45'; Hernández 57'	Report	López 50'	Stadium: Estadio Carlos Vega Villalba; Attendance: 1,200; Referee: Luis Alfredo García Rodríguez

25 April 2019	UACH	2–2	Atlético Reynosa	Ciudad Juárez
19:00 (UTC–6)	Guzmán 52'; Escobedo 56'	Report	Vázquez 68', 83'	Stadium: Estadio Olímpico Benito Juárez; Attendance: 250; Referee: Iván Antonio López Sánchez

===== Second leg =====
27 April 2019	Loros UdeC	2–1 (5–2 agg.)	Tuxtla	Colima
16:00	Mañón 39'; Cruz 90' (own)	Report	Castillo 66'	Stadium: Estadio Olímpico Universitario de Colima; Attendance: 2,100; Referee: Daniel Quintero Huitrón

27 April 2019	Irapuato	1–1 (1–1 agg.)	Cruz Azul Hidalgo	Irapuato
19:00	Cruz 51'	Report	Vidal 46'	Stadium: Estadio Sergio León Chávez; Attendance: 20,000; Referee: Áxel Meza Méndez

28 April 2019	Tepatitlán	2–2 (3–4 agg.)	Tuzos UAZ	Tepatitlán
17:00	Guzmán 24', 69'	Report	Torres 43', 77'	Stadium: Estadio Gregorio "Tepa" Gómez; Attendance: 3,000; Referee: Mario Terrazas Chávez

28 April 2019	Atlético Reynosa	1–0 (3–2 agg.)	UACH	Reynosa
18:00	Lara 36'	Report		Stadium: Unidad Deportiva Solidaridad; Attendance: 4,500; Referee: Gustavo Padilla Aguirre

==== Semi-finals ====
The first legs were played on 1 and 2 May, and the second legs were played on 4 and 5 May 2019.

Team 1	Agg.	Team 2	1st leg	2nd leg
Loros UdeC	4–1	Cruz Azul Hidalgo	2–1	2–0
Atlético Reynosa	0–2	Tuzos UAZ	0–2	0–0

===== First leg =====
1 May 2019	Cruz Azul Hidalgo	1–2	Loros UdeC	Ciudad Cooperativa Cruz Azul
16:00	López 19'	Report	Estrada 13'; Mañón 41'	Stadium: Estadio 10 de Diciembre; Attendance: 1,100; Referee: Gustavo Padilla Aguirre

2 May 2019	Tuzos UAZ	2–0	Atlético Reynosa	Zacatecas
17:00	Esquivel 35' (pen.); Argumedo 77'	Report		Stadium: Estadio Carlos Vega Villalba; Attendance: 3,000; Referee: Áxel Meza Méndez

===== Second leg =====
4 May 2019	Loros UdeC	2–0 (4–1 agg.)	Cruz Azul Hidalgo	Colima
16:00	Arreola 53'; Valdéz 83'	Report		Stadium: Estadio Olímpico Universitario de Colima; Attendance: 3,000; Referee: Mario Terrazas Chávez

5 May 2019	Atlético Reynosa	0–0 (0–2 agg.)	Tuzos UAZ	Reynosa
18:00		Report		Stadium: Unidad Deportiva Solidaridad; Attendance: 7,000; Referee: Daniel Quintero Huitrón

==== Final ====
The first leg was played on 8 May, and the second leg was played on 11 May 2019.

Team 1	Agg.	Team 2	1st leg	2nd leg
Loros UdeC	3–2	Tuzos UAZ	0–2	3–0

===== First leg =====
8 May 2019	Tuzos UAZ	2–0	Loros UdeC	Zacatecas
18:00	Argumedo 40', 72'	Report		Stadium: Estadio Carlos Vega Villalba; Attendance: 9,000; Referee: Mario Terrazas Chávez

===== Second leg =====
11 May 2019	Loros UdeC	3–0 (3–2 agg.)	Tuzos UAZ	Colima
16:00	Mañón 16', 82'; Coronel 87'	Report		Stadium: Estadio Olímpico Universitario de Colima; Attendance: 8,000; Referee: Daniel Quintero Huitrón

Season 2018–19 winners

3rd title

=== Liguilla de Filiales (Reserve Teams Playoffs) ===
The four best teams of reserve teams table play two games against each other on a home-and-away basis. The higher seeded teams play on their home field during the second leg. The winner of each match up is determined by aggregate score. In the semifinals, if the two teams are tied on aggregate the higher seeded team advances. In the final, if the two teams are tied after both legs, the match goes to extra time and, if necessary, a penalty shoot-out.

Semi-finals
1	Guadalajara	2	2	4
4	Toluca	1	1	2
2	Necaxa	0	1	1
3	UNAM	3	1	4

Final
1	Guadalajara	1	2	3
3	UNAM	1	3	4

==== Semi-finals ====
The first legs were played 25 April, and the second legs was played on 28 April 2019.

Team 1	Agg.	Team 2	1st leg	2nd leg
Guadalajara	4–2	Toluca	2–1	2–1
Necaxa	1–4	UNAM	0–3	1–1

===== First leg =====
25 April 2019	Toluca	1–2	Guadalajara	Metepec
10:00	Rodríguez 77'	Report	López 40'; Ochoa 68'	Stadium: Instalaciones de Metepec; Attendance: 100; Referee: Carlos Alberto Pérez Gutiérrez

25 April 2019	UNAM	3–0	Necaxa	Mexico City
10:00	Camacho 5'; Tosca 42'; Mendoza 71'	Report		Stadium: La Cantera; Attendance: 150; Referee: Iván de Jesús Velasco Villegas

===== Second leg =====
28 April 2019	Guadalajara	2–1 (4–2 agg.)	Toluca	Zapopan
10:00	Medina 52'; Domínguez 82'	Report	González 34'	Stadium: Verde Valle; Attendance: 300; Referee: Iván Antonio López Sánchez

28 April 2019	Necaxa	1–1 (1–4 agg.)	UNAM	Aguascalientes
11:00	Esquivel 46'	Report	Camacho 65'	Stadium: Estadio Victoria; Attendance: 150; Referee: Maximiliano Quintero Hernández

==== Final ====
The first leg was played on 2 May, and the second leg was played on 5 May 2019.

Team 1	Agg.	Team 2	1st leg	2nd leg
Guadalajara	3–4	UNAM	1–1	2–3

===== First leg =====
2 May 2019	UNAM	1–1	Guadalajara	Mexico City
10:00	Mendoza 50'	Report	Ochoa 54'	Stadium: Instalaciones de La Cantera; Attendance: 500; Referee: Luis Alfredo García Rodríguez

===== Second leg =====
5 May 2019	Guadalajara	2–3 (a.e.t.) (3–4 agg.)	UNAM	Zapopan
10:00	Medina 43'; Hernández 104'	Report	Mendoza 57', 98', 101'	Stadium: Estadio Akron; Attendance: 1,000; Referee: Iván Antonio López Sánchez

Reserves season 2018–19 winners

1st title

== Serie B ==
=== Changes from the previous season ===
The league went on to play in a tournament per season, playing 30 games per club. Followed by the eliminatory phase between the eight best classified to determine the champion of the division. The tournament will be played in a single group of 16 members.

- Club Marina C.R. will participate in Serie B as Third Division runner-up.
- Chapulineros de Oaxaca, Deportivo Zitácuaro, Tecamachalco F.C. and FC Satélites will not participate in Serie B.
- Club Calor relocated from Gomez Palacio, Durango to Monclova, Coahuila.
- Due to force majeure, Inter San Miguel force to relocate from San Miguel de Allende, Guanajuato to San Luis Potosí and rename FC Potosino.
- Mineros de Zacatecas Premier relocated from Tlaltenango de Sánchez Román, Zacatecas to Zacatecas City.

=== Stadium and locations ===
Location of teams in the 2018–19 Serie B

Club	Manager	City	Stadium	Capacity	Affiliate
Atlético Saltillo Soccer	(Mexico) Francisco Javier Gamboa	Saltillo, Coahuila	Olímpico Francisco I. Madero	7,000	—
CAFESSA	(Mexico) Jaime Durán	Tlajomulco de Zúñiga, Jalisco	Unidad Deportiva Mariano Otero	3,000	—
Calor	(Mexico) Luis Alberto Lozoya	Monclova, Coahuila	Unidad Deportiva Nora Leticia Rocha	4,000	—
Cañoneros Marina	(Mexico) José Gerardo Espinoza	Milpa Alta, Mexico City	Momoxco	3,500	—
Celaya	(Mexico) Luis Fernando Melgar	Celaya, Guanajuato	Miguel Alemán Valdés	23,182	Celaya
Ciervos	(Mexico) Francisco Javier Garay	Chalco de Díaz Covarrubias, State of Mexico	Arreola	2,500	—
Constructores de Gómez Palacio	(Mexico) Didier Gutiérrez	Gómez Palacio, Durango	Unidad Deportiva Francisco Gómez Palacio	4,000	—
Cuautla	(Mexico) Carlos González	Cuautla, Morelos	Isidro Gil Tapia	5,000	—
Deportivo Chimalhuacán	(Mexico) Pablo Robles	Chimalhuacán, State of Mexico	Deportivo La Laguna	2,000	—
Dorados de Sinaloa	(Mexico) Marco Marroquín	Culiacán, Sinaloa	Juventud	2,000	Dorados de Sinaloa
Gladiadores	(Mexico) René Fuentes	Cuautitlán, State of Mexico	Los Pinos	5,000	—
Mineros de Fresnillo	(Mexico) Juan Carlos Pro Méndez	Fresnillo, Zacatecas	Unidad Deportiva Minera Fresnillo	6,000	—
Mineros de Zacatecas	(Mexico) Víctor Montiel	Zacatecas City, Zacatecas	Carlos Vega Villalba	20,068	Mineros de Zacatecas
Ocelotes UNACH	(Mexico) Miguel Ángel Casanova	San Cristóbal de las Casas, Chiapas	Municipal de San Cristóbal de las Casas	4,000	—
Potosino	(Mexico) Edmundo Ríos	San Luis Potosí City, San Luis Potosí	Plan de San Luis	18,000	—
Sahuayo	(Mexico) José Daniel García (Interim)	Sahuayo, Michoacán	Unidad Deportiva Municipal	1,500	—

=== Regular season ===
==== Standings ====
Pos	Team	Pld	W	D	L	GF	GA	GD	BP	Pts	Qualification
1	Zacatecas Premier	30	19	4	7	75	41	+34	8	69	Advance to Liguilla
2	Celaya Premier	30	15	10	5	55	31	+24	4	59	Advance to Liguilla
3	Ocelotes UNACH	30	15	10	5	44	19	+25	2	57	Advance to Liguilla
4	Fresnillo	30	14	10	6	56	37	+19	4	56	Advance to Liguilla
5	Cañoneros Marina (C)	30	14	7	9	55	39	+16	5	54	Advance to Liguilla
6	Ciervos	30	15	5	10	40	35	+5	3	53	Advance to Liguilla
7	Atlético Saltillo	30	15	3	12	41	33	+8	2	50	Advance to Liguilla
8	CAFESSA	30	12	9	9	55	37	+18	4	49	Advance to Liguilla
9	Potosino	30	12	6	12	34	39	−5	2	44	
10	Calor	30	10	9	11	25	31	−6	1	40	
11	Cuautla	30	9	8	13	36	44	−8	3	38	
12	Dorados Premier	30	10	5	15	47	37	+10	2	37	
13	Constructores de Gómez Palacio	30	8	6	16	32	56	−24	3	33	
14	Nuevo Chimalhuacán	30	7	9	14	39	57	−18	1	31	
15	Deportivo Gladiadores	30	4	8	18	23	56	−33	0	20	
16	Sahuayo	30	3	7	20	29	94	−65	1	17	

Updated to match(es) played on April 20, 2019. Source: Sitio Oficial de la Liga Premier – Serie B
(C) Champions

==== Results ====
Home \ Away	ATS	CFS	CLR	CEL	CIE	CGP	CUA	DOR	GLA	MAR	MFR	CHI	OUC	POT	SHY	ZAS
At. Saltillo		1–3	2–0	3–1	1–2	1–0	2–0	1–0	1–1	1–0	1–0	2–1	1–0	0–0	6–0	3–1
CAFESSA	1–3		2–0	1–1	1–2	1–1	0–2	2–1	1–2	1–3	1–1	5–0	0–2	3–0	1–1	2–3
Calor	0–2	1–1		0–1	1–0	2–1	1–0	1–0	1–1	2–0	2–1	0–0	0–1	0–1	3–0	2–1
Celaya	1–0	0–0	0–0		4–0	2–1	2–2	3–2	1–0	0–3	0–3	5–2	1–0	4–0	9–0	2–1
Ciervos	2–0	1–1	2–0	1–0		2–1	2–1	2–1	5–0	1–0	0–1	2–0	0–0	1–0	1–2	1–3
Constructores	1–0	4–3	0–0	0–1	0–3		1–0	0–0	0–3	1–2	0–0	2–1	0–3	1–1	3–0	1–1
Cuautla	2–0	0–2	2–1	3–1	0–0	6–2		0–2	1–0	2–1	2–2	1–1	0–2	1–2	0–0	0–2
Dorados	1–2	1–3	2–0	1–1	2–0	4–0	0–1		3–0	1–3	5–0	3–1	1–2	1–2	8–0	2–4
Gladiadores	1–2	1–2	1–1	0–4	3–1	1–3	0–0	0–2		0–2	0–0	0–4	0–1	3–0	1–1	0–3
Cañoneros Marina	3–2	0–1	1–1	1–1	2–2	4–0	4–0	1–0	2–1		2–4	2–2	0–0	2–3	4–2	1–3
Mineros Fresnillo	3–1	1–2	2–2	2–2	1–1	4–1	3–1	3–0	2–0	1–2		5–1	1–0	2–1	3–1	1–1
Chimalhuacán	1–1	2–1	0–1	0–0	1–2	0–3	1–1	1–1	3–1	2–1	0–3		1–1	1–2	5–2	2–1
Ocelotes UNACH	2–0	0–0	3–0	1–2	2–0	2–1	0–0	1–1	4–0	1–1	1–1	1–1		4–0	4–1	2–4
Potosino	1–0	0–3	0–0	1–1	2–0	1–0	2–1	0–1	2–2	1–2	1–1	2–0	1–2		0–1	4–0
Sahuayo	2–1	1–9	1–2	1–1	1–3	2–4	1–4	1–1	1–1	1–1	3–5	2–3	0–1	0–4		0–2
Zacatecas	3–1	2–2	3–1	1–3	3–1	6–0	7–3	2–0	3–0	2–5	3–0	4–1	1–1	2–0	3–0	

Updated to match(es) played on 21 April 2019. Source: Liga Premier de México, League calendar
Legend: Blue = home team win; Yellow = draw; Red = away team win.

==== Positions by round ====
Leader and qualification to playoffs
Last place in table
Qualification to playoffs

Team ╲ Round	1	2	3	4	5	6	7	8	9	10	11	12	13	14	15	16	17	18	19	20	21	22	23	24	25	26	27	28	29	30
Mineros	2	1	2	2	1	1	1	1	1	1	1	1	1	1	1	1	1	1	1	1	1	1	1	1	1	1	1	1	1	1
Celaya	16	9	5	8	7	7	7	4	6	4	4	4	6	4	3	3	3	3	3	2	2	4	5	4	5	4	3	3	2	2
UNACH	1	4	3	1	4	4	2	3	2	3	3	3	3	5	4	4	5	4	4	4	4	3	3	5	3	3	4	4	3	3
Fresnillo	8	11	7	9	11	12	13	13	11	8	6	6	5	3	2	2	2	2	2	3	3	2	2	2	4	2	2	2	4	4
Marina	3	7	8	7	8	9	10	11	9	10	11	8	9	8	9	8	7	7	7	7	7	7	7	6	6	6	5	6	5	5
Ciervos	9	5	4	3	6	8	4	2	5	5	5	2	2	2	5	5	4	5	5	5	5	5	4	3	2	5	6	5	6	6
Saltillo	4	8	9	10	9	6	8	10	13	14	15	15	15	15	13	13	13	9	8	10	9	10	9	8	7	8	8	8	8	7
CAFESSA	15	6	11	11	10	10	7	6	3	2	2	5	7	9	6	6	6	6	6	6	6	6	6	7	8	7	7	7	7	8
Potosino	6	3	6	6	3	3	5	8	10	12	12	10	8	7	8	9	10	13	14	14	12	13	13	13	12	13	9	9	9	9
Calor	5	2	1	4	5	5	6	9	7	7	8	9	11	10	10	12	9	10	10	9	8	9	8	9	9	9	10	10	10	10
Cuautla	10	15	15	13	15	15	12	12	15	15	14	11	10	11	11	7	8	8	9	11	10	11	11	10	10	12	12	12	12	11
Dorados	14	16	14	16	16	16	16	15	12	13	9	13	13	13	12	11	12	12	11	8	11	8	10	11	11	10	11	11	11	12
Constructores	11	13	16	12	12	13	9	7	4	6	7	7	4	6	7	10	11	11	12	12	14	12	12	12	13	11	13	13	13	13
Chimalhuacán	12	12	10	5	2	2	3	5	8	9	10	14	12	12	14	14	14	14	13	13	13	14	14	14	14	14	14	14	14	14
Gladiadores	7	10	12	14	13	14	15	16	16	16	16	16	16	16	16	16	16	16	16	16	16	16	16	16	16	16	15	15	15	15
Sahuayo	14	14	13	15	14	11	14	14	14	11	13	12	14	14	15	15	15	15	15	15	15	15	15	15	15	15	16	16	16	16

Updated to match(es) played on 21 April 2019. Source: Liga Premier de México, League calendar

=== Regular season statistics ===
==== Scoring ====
- First goal of the season:*First goal of the season:
  (Mexico) Jesús Meléndez for Club Calor against Deportivo Nuevo Chimalhuacán (24 August 2018)

==== Top goalscorers ====
Players sorted first by goals scored, then by last name.

Rank	Player	Club	Goals
1	(Mexico) Illian Hernández	Mineros de Fresnillo	32
2	(Mexico) Antonio de Jesús Nava	Cuautla	22
3	(Mexico) Luis González	Mineros de Zacatecas	19
4	(Mexico) Osvaldo Ramírez	Ocelotes UNACH	15
5	(Mexico) Armando León	Mineros de Zacatecas	14
5	(Mexico) Marco Anaya	Chimalhuacán	14
7	(Mexico) Hugo Rodríguez	Cañoneros Marina	13
8	(Mexico) Miguel González	Dorados de Sinaloa	11
9	(Mexico) Omar González	Celaya	9
9	(Mexico) Mauro Arredondo	FC Potosino / Celaya	9
9	(Mexico) Jesús Aguirre	Mineros de Zacatecas	9
9	(Mexico) Francisco Viruete	CAFESSA	9
9	(Mexico) Raúl Reyes	Constructores / Atlético Saltillo	9
9	(Mexico) Luis Rangel	CAFESSA	9

Source: Liga Premier

==== Hat-tricks and more goals ====
Player	For	Against	Result	Date	Round	Reference
(Mexico) Raúl Reyes	Constructores GP	Chimalhuacán	0–3 (A)	19 October 2018	9	
(Mexico) Osvaldo Ramírez	Ocelotes UNACH	Gladiadores	4–0 (H)	26 October 2018	10	
(Mexico) Antonio de Jesús Nava	Cuautla	Constructores GP	6–2 (H)	3 November 2018	11	
(Mexico) Ilian Hernández	Fresnillo	Chimalhuacán	0–3 (A)	30 November 2018	15	
(Mexico) Ilian Hernández	Fresnillo	Cuautla	3–1 (H)	2 February 2019	19	
(Mexico) Edgar López	Dorados de Sinaloa	Sahuayo	8–0 (H)	9 February 2019	20	
(Mexico) Luis González	Mineros de Zacatecas	Cuautla	7–3 (H)	9 February 2019	20	
(Mexico) Antonio de Jesús Nava	C.D. Cuautla	Mineros de Zacatecas	7–3 (A)	9 February 2019	20	
(Mexico) Edgar Leyva	Cañoneros Marina	Mineros de Zacatecas	2–5 (A)	2 March 2019	23	
(Mexico) Jesús de Lucio	CAFESSA	Sahuayo	1–9 (A)	2 March 2019	23	
(Mexico) Antonio de Jesús Nava	Cuautla	Sahuayo	1–4 (A)	20 April 2019	30	
(Mexico) Ilian Hernández	Fresnillo	Chimalhuacán	5–1 (H)	20 April 2019	30	

(H) – Home; (A) – Away

=== Attendance ===
==== Per team ====
Pos	Team	Total	High	Low	Average	Change
1	Calor	17,450	2,000	400	1,163	+1,150.5%^{1}
2	Atlético Saltillo	17,200	3,800	500	1,147	+204.2%
3	Ocelotes UNACH	11,150	1,500	150	743	+312.8%
4	Cuautla	5,900	1,500	200	393	+89.9%
5	Mineros de Fresnillo	4,950	1,500	50	330	−34.4%
6	CAFESSA	3,250	500	100	217	+12.4%
7	Sahuayo	3,225	800	25	215	−59.9%
8	Gladiadores (Note: The match against Potosino of Week 16 was annulled by the League, for this reason, the team has a home game less in the attendance recount.)	2,950	300	150	211	+48.6%
9	Ciervos	2,700	400	100	180	−7.7%
10	Celaya	2,350	400	100	157	−10.3%
11	Cañoneros Marina	2,304	1,000	50	154	n/a^{3}
12	Constructores (Note: Matches against Gladiadores and Ocelotes UNACH of Weeks 28 and 30 were annulled by the League, for this reason, the team has two home games less in the attendance recount.)	1,920	300	100	148	+15.6%
13	Potosino (Note: The match against CAFESSA of Week 7 was annulled by the League, for this reason, the team has a home game less in the attendance recount.)	1,650	350	10	118	n/a^{2}
14	Dorados de Sinaloa	1,600	200	50	107	−41.5%
15	Deportivo Chimalhuacán	1,500	200	50	100	−21.9%
16	Mineros de Zacatecas	1,120	200	50	75	−70.0%^{4}
	League total	81,219	3,800	0	344	+32.8%

Updated to games played on 21 April 2019
Source: Liga Premier FMF (available in each game report)
Notes:
Only regular season listed
1: Team played last season on Gómez Palacio, Durango.
2: Team did not play last season.
3: Team played last season on Tercera División.
4: Team played last season on Tlaltenango de Sánchez Román, Zacatecas.

==== Highest and lowest ====
Highest attendance					Lowest attendance			
Week	Home	Score	Away	Attendance	Home	Score	Away	Attendance
1	Sahuayo	0–2	Mineros de Zacatecas	800	Celaya	2–2	Cañoneros Marina	100
2	Cuautla	1–1	Chimalhuacán	1,500	Mineros de Zacatecas	3–1	Atlético Saltillo	50
3	Calor	1–0	Cuautla	1,500	CAFESSA	1–2	Ciervos	100
4	Ocelotes UNACH	4–1	Sahuayo	1,500	Cañoneros Marina	3–2	Atlético Saltillo	100
5	Calor	1–1	Gladiadores	1,500	Mineros de Fresnillo	1–2	CAFESSA	100
6	Ocelotes UNACH	1–1	Chimalhuacán	1,500	Mineros de Zacatecas	3–0	Mineros de Fresnillo	70
7	Calor	0–1	Ocelotes UNACH	1,800	Mineros de Zacatecas	3–0	Gladiadores	50
8	Ocelotes UNACH	0–0	Cuautla	400	Cañoneros Marina	1–3	Mineros de Zacatecas	74
9	Calor	1–0	Ciervos	800	Chimalhuacán	0–3	Constructores	100
10	Constructores	0–0	Calor	300	Cañoneros Marina	2–4	Mineros de Fresnillo	50
11	Calor	1–1	CAFESSA	1,000	Mineros de Zacatecas	3–1	Ciervos	50
12	Ocelotes UNACH	1–1	Mineros de Fresnillo	1,500	Potosino	2–0	Chimalhuacán	10
13	Ocelotes UNACH	1–1	Dorados de Sinaloa	1,500	Chimalhuacán	5–2	Sahuayo	50
14	Atlético Saltillo	2–1	Chimalhuacán	700	Potosino	2–1	Cuautla	20
15	Calor	0–2	Atlético Saltillo	1,500	Cañoneros Marina	0–1	CAFESSA	50
16	Calor	0–0	Chimalhuacán	800	Cañoneros Marina	1–1	Celaya	50
17	Atlético Saltillo	3–1	Mineros de Zacatecas	1,000	Potosino	1–2	Cañoneros Marina	50
18	Ocelotes UNACH	4–0	Potosino	500	Constructores	0–0	Mineros de Fresnillo	100
19	Calor	2–1	Mineros de Zacatecas	1,200	Potosino	0–1	Dorados de Sinaloa	50
20	Ocelotes UNACH	2–0	Atlético Saltillo	1,000	Mineros de Zacatecas	7–3	Cuautla	50
21	Atlético Saltillo	1–0	Dorados de Sinaloa	3,000	Potosino	1–0	Constructores	50
22	Ocelotes UNACH	3–0	Calor	500	Cañoneros Marina	4–0	Cuautla	100
23	Calor	1–0	Dorados de Sinaloa	1,500	Sahuayo	1–9	CAFESSA	50
24	Ocelotes UNACH	2–4	Mineros de Zacatecas	400	Cañoneros Marina	2–1	Gladiadores	80
25	Atlético Saltillo	3–1	Celaya	2,000	Chimalhuacán	2–1	CAFESSA	50
26	Ocelotes UNACH	1–1	Cañoneros Marina	500	Sahuayo	3–5	Mineros de Fresnillo	50
27	Atlético Saltillo	6–0	Sahuayo	2,000	Chimalhuacán	1–2	Potosino	50
28	Atlético Saltillo	1–0	Fresnillo	500	Sahuayo	2–3	Chimalhuacán	50
29	Calor	3–0	Sahuayo	400	Chimalhuacán	1–1	Atlético Saltillo	50
30	Atlético Saltillo	2–0	Calor	3,800	Sahuayo	1–4	Cuautla	25

Source:Liga Premier FMF (available in each game report)

=== Liguilla (Playoffs) ===
The four best teams of each group play two games against each other on a home-and-away basis. The higher seeded teams play on their home field during the second leg. The winner of each match up is determined by aggregate score. In the quarterfinals and semifinals, if the two teams are tied on aggregate the higher seeded team advances. In the final, if the two teams are tied after both legs, the match goes to extra time and, if necessary, a penalty shoot-out.

Quarter-finals
4	Fresnillo	1	1	2
5	Cañoneros Marina	3	3	6
2	Celaya	1	1	2
7	Atlético Saltillo (a)	0	2	2
3	Ocelotes UNACH	2	2	4
6	Ciervos	1	0	1
1	Mineros de Zacatecas	1	0	1
8	CAFESSA	2	0	2

Semi-finals
5	Cañoneros Marina (a)	1	0	1
7	Atlético Saltillo	1	0	1
3	Ocelotes UNACH	1	0	1
8	CAFESSA	2	1	3

Final
5	Cañoneros Marina	0	3	3
8	CAFESSA	2	0	2

==== Quarter-finals ====
The first legs were played on 26 and 27 April, and the second legs were played on 3, 4 and 5 May 2019.

Team 1	Agg.	Team 2	1st leg	2nd leg
Mineros de Zacatecas	1–2	CAFESSA	1–2	0–0
Celaya	2–2	Atlético Saltillo (a)	1–0	1–2
Ocelotes UNACH	4–1	Ciervos	2–1	2–0
Fresnillo	2–6	Cañoneros Marina	1–3	1–3

===== First leg =====
26 April 2019	Atlético Saltillo	0–1	Celaya	Saltillo
20:00		Report	Arredondo 14'	Stadium: Estadio Olímpico Francisco I. Madero; Attendance: 5,000; Referee: Simón Alberto Estrada Carmona

27 April 2019	Ciervos	1–2	Ocelotes UNACH	Chalco
16:00	Quintos 41'	Report	Loera 39'; Limón 45'	Stadium: Campo Club Arreola; Attendance: 300; Referee: Guillermo Michel Álvarez Górriz

27 April 2019	Cañoneros Marina	3–1	Fresnillo	Milpa Alta, Mexico City
16:00	Bustillos 2'; Rodríguez 44'; Ávila 83'	Report	Hernández 21'	Stadium: Estadio Momoxco; Attendance: 80; Referee: Moisés Clement Lezma

27 April 2019	CAFESSA	2–1	Mineros de Zacatecas	Tlajomulco de Zúñiga
20:00	Arana 21'; Bernal 78'	Report	González 31'	Stadium: Unidad Deportiva Mariano Otero; Attendance: 1,500; Referee: Ismael Rosario López Peñuelas

===== Second leg =====
3 May 2019	Fresnillo	1–3 (2–6 agg.)	Cañoneros Marina	Fresnillo
19:00	Hernández 67'	Report	Lizarde 34'; Romualdo 36', 79'	Stadium: Unidad Deportiva Minera Fresnillo; Attendance: 2,000; Referee: Ismael Rosario López Pañuelas

4 May 2019	Ocelotes UNACH	2–0 (4–1 agg.)	Ciervos	San Cristóbal de las Casas
17:00	Loera 72'; Ramírez 73'	Report		Stadium: Estadio Municipal de San Cristóbal de las Casas; Attendance: 1,700; Referee: Maximiliano Quintero Hernández

5 May 2019	Mineros de Zacatecas	0–0 (1–2 agg.)	CAFESSA	Zacatecas
11:00		Report		Stadium: Estadio Carlos Vega Villalba; Attendance: 300; Referee: Edgardo Espejo Tello

5 May 2019	Celaya	1–2 (2–2 agg.)	Atlético Saltillo	Celaya
12:00	Guerrero 41'	Report	Carrillo 2'; Ríos 75'	Stadium: Estadio Miguel Alemán Valdés; Attendance: 500; Referee: Iván de Jesús Velasco Villegas

==== Semi-finals ====
The first legs were played on 8 May, and the second legs were played on 11 May 2019.

Team 1	Agg.	Team 2	1st leg	2nd leg
Ocelotes UNACH	1–3	CAFESSA	1–2	0–1
Cañoneros Marina (a)	1–1	Atlético Saltillo	1–1	0–0

===== First leg =====
8 May 2019	Atlético Saltillo	1–1	Cañoneros Marina	Saltillo
20:00	Moreno 20'	Report	Silva 67'	Stadium: Estadio Olímpico Francisco I. Madero; Attendance: 6,500; Referee: Gustavo Padilla Aguirre

8 May 2019	CAFESSA	2–1	Ocelotes UNACH	Tlajomulco
20:00	Arriaga 17'; González 82'	Report	Limón 46'	Stadium: Unidad Deportiva Mariano Otero; Attendance: 1,500; Referee: Ismael Rosario López Peñuelas

===== Second leg =====
11 May 2019	Cañoneros Marina	0–0 (1–1 agg.)	Atlético Saltillo	Milpa Alta, Mexico City
16:00		Report		Stadium: Estadio Momoxco; Attendance: 150; Referee: Iván de Jesús Velasco Villegas

11 May 2019	Ocelotes UNACH	0–1 (1–3 agg.)	CAFESSA	San Cristóbal de las Casas
17:00		Report	Arriaga 52'	Stadium: Estadio Municipal de San Cristóbal de las Casas; Attendance: 2,500; Referee: Maximiliano Quintero Hernández

==== Final ====
The first leg were played on 15 May, and the second leg will be played on 18 May 2019.

Team 1	Agg.	Team 2	1st leg	2nd leg
Cañoneros Marina	3–2	CAFESSA	0–2	3–0

===== First leg =====
15 May 2019	CAFESSA	2–0	Cañoneros Marina	Tlajomulco
20:00	Bernal 27'; González 53'	Report		Stadium: Unidad Deportiva Mariano Otero; Attendance: 2,000; Referee: Áxel Meza Méndez

===== Second leg =====
18 May 2019	Cañoneros Marina	3–0 (3–2 agg.)	CAFESSA	Milpa Alta, Mexico City
16:00	Leyva 13'; Arteaga 68'; Silva 85'	Report		Stadium: Estadio Momoxco; Attendance: 500; Referee: Maximiliano Quintero Hernández

Season 2018–19 winners

1st title

== See also ==
- 2018–19 Liga MX season
- 2018–19 Ascenso MX season
- 2018–19 Liga TDP season
