= 2017–18 Serie B de México season =

Serie B de México
- Season: 2017-18
- Dates: 11 August 2017 – 12 May 2018
- Champions: Apertura: Yalmakán; Clausura; Albinegros de Orizaba
- Promoted: Yalmakán
- Relegated: Cuatetes de Acapulco
- Top goalscorer: Apertura: Isaac Yair García (11 goals); Clausura; Isaac Yair García (16 goals)
- Biggest home win: Apertura: Tlaxcala 8–0 Cuatetes (10 September 2017); Clausura; Chapulineros 8–0 Cuatetes (12 January 2018); Yalmakán 8–0 FC Satélites (18 March 2018)
- Biggest away win: Apertura: FC Satélites 1–6 Tlaxcala (17 September 2017); Isleños del Carmen 1–6 Tecamachalco (22 October 2017); Clausura; Cuatetes 0–10 Tlaxcala (4 February 2018)
- Highest scoring: Apertura: Tlaxcala (36 points); Clausura; Leones Negros (35 points)
- Highest attendance: Apertura: Tlaxcala 2–0 Deportivo Gladiadores (3,000); Clausura; Isleños 0–2 Orizaba (2,000)
- Lowest attendance: Apertura: UAT 2–0 Dorados (0); Clausura; Cuautla 0–0 Tlaxcala (0)
- Total attendance: Apertura: 67,886; Clausura; 46,873
- Average attendance: Apertura: 373; Clausura; 269
- Stats are from the regular season only

The 2017–18 Serie B de México season was split into two tournaments, the Apertura and the Clausura. Serie B is the fourth-tier football league of Mexico. The season was played between 11 August 2017 and 12 May 2018.

== Torneo Apertura ==
=== Changes from the previous season ===
28 teams participated in this season:

- Deportivo San Juan moved to San Miguel de Allende and became Inter San Miguel.
- Colibríes de Malinalco moved to Huixquilucan and became Tecamachalco F.C.
- Vikingos F.C. changed its name to Ciervos F.C.
- Titanes de Saltillo changed its name to Atlético Saltillo Soccer.
- Deportivo CAFESSA, Constructores de Gómez Palacio, Isleños del Carmen and Deportivo Zitácuaro were admitted as expansion teams.
- Atlético Lagunero, Garzas UAEH and Patriotas de Córdoba disappeared.
- Alacranes Rojos de Apatzingán was relegated to Tercera División.
- Tlaxcala F.C. reserve team played this season in Serie B.
- Albinegros de Orizaba, Chapulineros de Oaxaca, Ocelotes UNACH, Tuzos UAZ and Leones Negros UdeG Premier played Serie B for not having the necessary sports infrastructure for Serie A.
- Between Apertura 2017 and Clausura 2018, Isleños del Carmen moved to Villahermosa, Tabasco and changed its name to Cocodrilos de Tabasco.

=== Stadiums and Locations ===
==== Group 1 ====
Location of teams in the 2017–18 Serie B Group 1

Club	City	Stadium	Capacity
Atlético Saltillo Soccer	Saltillo, Coahuila	Olímpico Francisco I. Madero	7,000
CAFESSA	Tlajomulco de Zúñiga, Jalisco	Unidad Deportiva Mariano Otero	3,000
Calor	Gómez Palacio, Durango	Unidad Deportiva Francisco Gómez Palacio	4,000
Celaya Premier	Celaya, Guanajuato	Miguel Alemán Valdés	23,182
Cimarrones Premier	Guaymas, Sonora	Miguel Castro Servín	4,000
Correcaminos Premier	Ciudad Victoria, Tamaulipas	Marte R. Gómez	10,520
Constructores	Gómez Palacio, Durango	Unidad Deportiva Francisco Gómez Palacio	4,000
Dorados Premier	Culiacán, Sinaloa	Juventud	2,000
Inter San Miguel	San Miguel de Allende, Guanajuato	José María 'Capi' Correa	4,000
Mineros de Fresnillo	Fresnillo, Zacatecas	Unidad Deportiva Minera Fresnillo	6,000
Sahuayo	Sahuayo, Michoacán	Unidad Deportiva Municipal	1,500
Tuzos UAZ	Zacatecas City, Zacatecas	Francisco Villa	14,000
UdeG Premier	Ameca, Jalisco	Núcleo Deportivo y de Espectáculos Ameca	4,000
Zacatecas Premier	Tlaltenango, Zacatecas	La Alberca	1,000

==== Group 2 ====
Location of teams in the 2017–18 Serie B Group 2

Club	City	Stadium	Capacity
Albinegros de Orizaba	Orizaba, Veracruz	Socum	7,000
Ciervos F.C.	Chalco, State of Mexico	Arreola	2,500
Chapulineros de Oaxaca	Oaxaca City, Oaxaca	Tecnológico de Oaxaca	14,598
Cuatetes de Acapulco	Acapulco, Guerrero	Unidad Deportiva Acapulco	13,000
C.D. Cuautla	Cuautla, Morelos	Isidro Gil Tapia	5,000
Deportivo Nuevo Chimalhuacán	Chimalhuacán, State of Mexico	La Laguna	2,000
Deportivo Gladiadores	Cuautitlán, State of Mexico	Los Pinos	5,000
FC Satélites	Tulancingo, Hidalgo	Unidad Deportiva Javier Rojo Gómez	2,000
Isleños del Carmen / Cocodrilos de Tabasco	Ciudad del Carmen, Campeche	Olímpico de Villahermosa	12,000
Ocelotes UNACH	San Cristóbal de las Casas, Chiapas	Municipal de San Cristóbal de las Casas	4,000
Tecamachalco F.C.	Huixquilucan, State of Mexico	Alberto Pérez Navarro	3,000
Tlaxcala F.C.	Tlaxcala City, Tlaxcala	Tlahuicole	7,000
Yalmakán F.C.	Puerto Morelos, Quintana Roo	Unidad Deportiva Colonia Pescadores	1,200
Zitácuaro	Zitácuaro, Michoacán	Ignacio López Rayón	10,000

=== Regular season ===
==== Group 1 ====
===== Standings =====
Pos	Team	Pld	W	D	L	GF	GA	GD	Pts	Qualification
1	Zacatecas Premier	13	10	1	2	25	9	+16	33	Advance to Liguilla
2	Correcaminos Premier	13	7	4	2	21	12	+9	25	Advance to Liguilla
3	Dorados Premier	13	7	3	3	22	10	+12	24	Advance to Liguilla
4	Atlético Saltillo Soccer	13	7	2	4	20	17	+3	24	Advance to Liguilla
5	Inter San Miguel	13	6	3	4	23	18	+5	23	
6	UdeG Premier	13	6	3	4	12	7	+5	23	
7	Tuzos UAZ	13	6	4	3	17	18	−1	22	
8	Celaya Premier	13	4	3	6	14	14	0	16	
9	Calor	13	3	6	4	12	12	0	16	
10	Sahuayo	13	4	3	6	16	18	−2	16	
11	Mineros de Fresnillo	13	4	3	6	11	19	−8	15	
12	Constructores	13	2	5	6	12	16	−4	11	
13	CAFESSA	13	1	5	7	15	24	−9	9	
14	Cimarrones Premier	13	0	3	10	12	38	−26	3	

Updated to match(es) played on November 25, 2017. Source: SoccerWay

===== Results =====
Home \ Away	ATS	CAF	CAL	CEL	CIM	COR	CGP	DOR	ISM	MFR	SAH	UAZ	UDG	ZAS
Atlético Saltillo Soccer		3–2	0–0		3–1	1–1				1–0	2–0	5–1		
CAFESSA				1–1	3–3	1–2	3–2					1–2	0–0	
Calor		0–0						1–0	0–2	0–0	4–1			0–1
Celaya	2–0		2–1			0–1	1–2	0–0				1–2	1–2	
Cimarrones			1–2	1–3		0–0	1–1					2–3	1–3	
Correcaminos			2–2					2–0	2–1	5–1	2–2			1–0
Constructores	0–2		1–1			1–2		1–1	1–2			0–1		2–0
Dorados	4–1	2–0			4–0				3–1	3–0	2–1			1–2
Inter San Miguel	4–1	2–2		1–1	4–1					2–0	2–1		0–2	
Fresnillo		3–1		0–1	1–0		2–1					1–1	1–0	
Sahuayo		2–0		2–1	5–0		0–0			2–0			0–0	
Tuzos UAZ			1–1			1–0		1–1	1–1		3–0			0–3
UdeG	0–1		1–0			2–1	0–0	0–1				2–0		0–1
Zacatecas	2–0	2–1		1–0	6–1				3–1	2–2	2–0			

Updated to match(es) played on 25 November 2017. Source: SoccerWay
Legend: Blue = home team win; Yellow = draw; Red = away team win.

==== Group 2 ====
===== Standings =====
Pos	Team	Pld	W	D	L	GF	GA	GD	Pts	Qualification
1	Tlaxcala	13	10	2	1	40	3	+37	36	Advance to Liguilla
2	Albinegros de Orizaba	13	9	2	2	27	9	+18	33	Advance to Liguilla
3	Yalmakán	13	8	2	3	24	10	+14	27	Advance to Liguilla
4	Deportivo Chimalhuacán	13	7	4	2	19	8	+11	26	Advance to Liguilla
5	Chapulineros de Oaxaca	13	7	2	4	26	12	+14	24	
6	Deportivo Gladiadores	13	5	4	4	11	10	+1	20	
7	Ocelotes UNACH	13	5	3	5	21	13	+8	19	
8	Cuautla	13	4	5	4	18	18	0	19	
9	Zitácuaro	13	5	3	5	14	22	−8	18	
10	Tecamachalco	13	4	1	8	22	26	−4	15	
11	Ciervos	13	3	3	7	10	28	−18	12	
12	Isleños	13	2	2	9	6	37	−31	8	
13	FC Satélites	13	1	4	8	13	33	−20	7	
14	Cuatetes de Acapulco	13	2	1	10	15	37	−22	7	

Updated to match(es) played on November 25, 2017. Source: SoccerWay

===== Results =====
Home \ Away	ALB	CHA	CIE	CTA	CUA	DCH	GLA	FCS	ISL	OUC	TEC	TLA	YAL	ZIT
Albinegros de Orizaba		1–0		4–2	0–1				3–0	2–0			5–1	
Chapulineros de Oaxaca						0–0	1–1	4–0	5–0		5–1	0–3		4–0
Ciervos	0–3	1–2			1–1	0–4					3–2		0–0	1–2
Cuatetes de Acapulco		0–3	1–0			3–4		1–1		1–0	2–3			2–3
Cuautla		1–2		3–2		2–1			1–1	1–2			1–0	
Dep. Chimalhuacán	0–0						0–1	3–0	2–0		2–1	0–0		1–0
Dep. Gladiadores	0–2		0–0	3–0	2–2				0–1	1–1			1–0	
FC Satélites	2–4		2–3		2–2		0–1		2–0			1–6	0–3	
Isleños del Carmen			0–1	2–1						0–3	1–6			1–1
Ocelotes UNACH		1–0	7–0			0–1		1–1			3–1	1–1		1–2
Tecamachalco	0–2				2–2		0–1	4–1				0–3	0–1	
Tlaxcala	2–0		4–0	8–0	1–0		2–0		7–0				0–1	
Yalmakán		3–0		3–0		1–1			5–0	2–1				4–1
Zitácuaro	1–1				2–1		1–0	1–1			0–2	0–3		

Updated to match(es) played on 25 November 2017. Source: SoccerWay
Legend: Blue = home team win; Yellow = draw; Red = away team win.

=== Regular season statistics ===
==== Scoring ====
- First goal of the season: Hamblet Gaona (Ocelotes UNACH)

==== Top goalscorers ====
Players sorted first by goals scored, then by last name.

Rank	Player	Club	Goals
1	(Mexico) Isaac Yaír García	Inter San Miguel	11
1	(Mexico) Luis Fernando Torres	Tlaxcala F.C.	11
1	(Mexico) Fernando Villalpando	Mineros de Zacatecas Premier	11
2	(Mexico) Mario Iván Sánchez	Deportivo Chimalhuacán	9
2	(Mexico) José Francisco Almanza	Tlaxcala F.C.	9

Source: Liga Premier

=== Attendance ===
==== Per team ====
Pos	Team	Total	High	Low	Average	Change
1	Tlaxcala F.C.	10,300	3,000	3,000	1,471	n/a
2	Albinegros de Orizaba	7,350	1,500	1,200	1,225	n/a
3	Atlético Saltillo Soccer	6,250	2,500	500	893	n/a
4	Zacatecas Premier	5,700	1,500	300	814	n/a
5	Inter San Miguel	4,400	1,000	250	629	n/a
6	Sahuayo	3,300	1,000	200	550	n/a
7	Mineros de Fresnillo	2,700	1,000	100	450	n/a
8	Ocelotes UNACH	3,100	700	300	443	n/a
9	Ciervos	2,650	1,300	200	379	n/a
10	Cuautla	1,900	600	200	317	n/a
11	Zitácuaro	1,850	500	200	308	n/a
12	Yalmakán	1,500	400	200	300	n/a
13	Chapulineros de Oaxaca	2,050	500	200	293	n/a
14	Isleños del Carmen	1,250	500	150	250	n/a
15	Deportivo Chimalhuacán	1,550	300	200	221	n/a
16	CAFESSA	1,250	300	50	208	n/a
17	Constructores	1,250	400	100	179	n/a
18	Tuzos UAZ	800	300	100	160	n/a
19	Celaya Premier	1,100	300	100	157	n/a
20	Tecamachalco F.C.	925	300	50	154	n/a
21	FC Satélites	1,050	250	50	150	n/a
22	Cuatetes de Acapulco	1,000	300	100	143	n/a
23	Deportivo Gladiadores	950	300	100	136	n/a
24	Dorados Premier	950	200	100	136	n/a
25	Correcaminos Premier	809	200	50	135	n/a
26	Cimarrones Premier	650	200	50	108	n/a
27	UdeG Premier	732	232	50	105	n/a
28	Calor	570	200	50	95	n/a
	League total	67,886	3,000	50	373	n/a

Updated to games played on 25 November 2017
Source: Liga Premier FMF (available in each game report)
Notes:
Only regular season listed

==== Highest and lowest ====
Highest attendance					Lowest attendance			
Week	Home	Score	Away	Attendance	Home	Score	Away	Attendance
1	Albinegros de Orizaba	4–2	Cuatetes de Acapulco	1,300	Correcaminos Premier	2–0	Dorados Premier	50
2	Tlaxcala F.C.	2–0	Deportivo Gladiadores	3,000	Tecamachalco	2–2	Cuautla	75
3	Albinegros de Oriza	3–0	Isleños del Carmen	1,300	Deportivo Gladiadores	3–0	Cuatetes de Acapulco	100
4	Zacatecas Premier	3–1	Inter San Miguel	1,500	Cimarrones Premier	2–3	Tuzos UAZ	100
5	Tlaxcala F.C.	8–0	Cuatetes de Acapulco	2,000	Constructores	1–1	Dorados Premier	100
6	Zacatecas Premier	2–0	Atlético Saltillo Soccer	800	Calor	4–1	Sahuayo F.C.	70
7	Albinegros de Orizaba	0–1	Cuautla	1,500	UdeG Premier	0–1	Dorados Premier	50
8	Dorados Premier	1–2	Zacatecas Premier	200	Tecamachalco	0–3	Tlaxcala F.C.	50
9	Tlaxcala F.C.	0–1	Yalmakán	2,500	UdeG Premier	1-0	Calor	50
10	Albinegros de Orizaba	1–0	Chapulineros de Oaxaca	1,300	Calor	0–1	Zacatecas Premier	50
11	Atlético Saltillo Soccer	2–0	Sahuayo F.C.	2,000	UdeG Premier	2–1	Correcaminos Premier	50
12	Atlético Saltillo Soccer	3–1	Cimarrones Premier	850	Mineros de Fresnillo	1–0	UdeG Premier	100
13	Tlaxcala F.C.	2–0	Albinegros de Orizaba	1,000	UdeG Premier	2–0	Tuzos UAZ	50

Source:Liga Premier FMF (available in each game report)

=== Liguilla ===
The four best teams of each group play two games against each other on a home-and-away basis. The higher seeded teams play on their home field during the second leg. The winner of each match up is determined by aggregate score. In the quarterfinals and semifinals, if the two teams are tied on aggregate the higher seeded team advances. In the final, if the two teams are tied after both legs, the match goes to extra time and, if necessary, a penalty shoot-out.

Quarter-finals
1	Tlaxcala F.C.	1	4	5
8	Atlético Saltillo Soccer	0	2	2
3	Zacatecas Premier	0	2	2
6	Correcaminos Premier (a)	1	1	2
2	Albinegros de Orizaba (*)	2	1	3
7	Dorados Premier	1	2	3
4	Yalmakán (s)	0	2	2
5	Deportivo Chimalhuacán	2	0	2

Semi-finals
1	Tlaxcala F.C.	2	1	3
6	Correcaminos Premier	1	0	1
2	Albinegros de Orizaba	1	2	3
4	Yalmakán	3	2	5

Final
1	Tlaxcala F.C.	1	0	1
4	Yalmakán	1	1	2

==== Quarter-finals ====
The first legs was played on 10 and 11 November 2017, and the second legs was played on 18 and 19 November 2017.

Team 1	Agg.	Team 2	1st leg	2nd leg
Tlaxcala F.C.	5–2	Atlético Saltillo Soccer	1–0	4–2
Zacatecas Premier	2–2	Correcaminos Premier (a)	0–1	2–1
Albinegros de Orizaba	3–3	Dorados Premier	2–1	1–2
Yalmakán (s)	2–2	Deportivo Chimalhuacán	0–2	2–0

===== First leg =====
10 November 2017	Deportivo Chimalhuacán	2–0	Yalmakán	Chimalhuacán, State of Mexico
15:00	Hernández 19'; Cabrera 60'	Report		Stadium: Estadio La Laguna; Attendance: 600; Referee: (Mexico) Eduardo Vázquez

11 November 2017	Dorados Premier	1–2	Albinegros de Orizaba	Navolato, Sinaloa
10:00	Contreras 53'	Report	Vázquez 60'; Prieto 63'	Stadium: Estadio Juventud; Attendance: 100; Referee: (Mexico) Alan Martínez

11 November 2017	Correcaminos Premier	1–0	Zacatecas	Ciudad Victoria, Tamaulipas
11:00	Montelongo 26'	Report		Stadium: Estadio Marte R. Gómez; Attendance: 200; Referee: (Mexico) Jesús Ruíz

11 November 2017	Atlético Saltillo Soccer	0–1	Tlaxcala F.C.	Saltillo, Coahuila
19:00		Report	Rabadán 14'	Stadium: Estadio Olímpico Francisco I. Madero; Attendance: 3,000; Referee: (Mexico) Oziel Méndez

===== Second leg =====
18 November 2017	Albinegros de Orizaba	1–2 (3–3 agg.)	Dorados Premier	Orizaba, Veracruz
12:00	Vázquez 71'	Report	Contreras 47'; González 85'	Stadium: Estadio Socum; Attendance: 1,000; Referee: (Mexico) Arturo González

18 November 2017	Tlaxcala F.C.	4–2 (5–2 agg.)	Atlético Saltillo Soccer	Tlaxcala City, Tlaxcala
18:00	Almanza 4'; Roque 17'; Mercado 35'; Rabadán 69'	Report	Moncada 59'; Meléndez 87'	Stadium: Estadio Tlahuicole; Attendance: 1,500; Referee: (Mexico) Guillermo Larios

18 November 2017	Zacatecas Premier	2–1 (2–2 agg.)	Correcaminos Premier	Tlaltenango, Zacatecas
19:00	Villalpando 29'; Ramírez 58'	Report	Paz 55'	Stadium: Campo Deportivo La Alberca; Attendance: 1,500; Referee: (Mexico) Juan Canales

19 November 2017	Yalmakán	2–0 (2–2 agg.)	Deportivo Chimalhuacán	Puerto Morelos, Quintana Roo
15:00	Guzmán 26'; Molina 29'	Report		Stadium: Unidad Deportiva Colonia Pescadores; Attendance: 400; Referee: (Mexico) Gilberto Alvarado

==== Semi-finals ====
The first legs was played on 22 November, and the second legs was played on 25 November 2017.

Team 1	Agg.	Team 2	1st leg	2nd leg
Tlaxcala F.C.	3–1	Correcaminos Premier	2–1	1–0
Albinegros de Orizaba	3–5	Yalmakán	1–3	2–2

===== First leg =====
22 November 2017	Yalmakán	3–1	Albinegros de Orizaba	Puerto Morelos, Quintana Roo
15:00	Navarro 31'; Pelayo 50'; Galindo 55'	Report	Vázquez 64'	Stadium: Unidad Deportiva Colonia Pescadores; Attendance: 200; Referee: (Mexico) Alan Pérez

22 November 2017	Correcaminos Premier	1–2	Tlaxcala F.C.	Ciudad Victoria, Tamaulipas
19:00	Jiménez 83'	Report	Almanza 59'; Mercado 89'	Stadium: Estadio Marte R. Gómez; Attendance: 400; Referee: (Mexico) Mario Loredo

===== Second leg =====
25 November 2017	Albinegros de Orizaba	2–2 (3–5 agg.)	Yalmakán	Orizaba, Veracruz
12:00	Vázquez 48'; Martínez 83'	Report	Navarro 6'; Galindo 8'	Stadium: Estadio Socum; Attendance: 2,200; Referee: (Mexico) Jesús Ruíz

25 November 2017	Tlaxcala F.C.	1–0 (3–1 agg.)	Correcaminos Premier	Tlaxcala City, Tlaxcala
18:00	Castro 44'	Report		Stadium: Estadio Tlahuicole; Attendance: 2,000; Referee: (Mexico) Mario Terrazas

==== Final ====
The first leg was played on 30 November, and the second leg was played on 3 December 2017.

Team 1	Agg.	Team 2	1st leg	2nd leg
Tlaxcala F.C.	1–2	Yalmakán	1–1	0–1

===== First leg =====
30 November 2017	Yalmakán	1–1	Tlaxcala F.C.	Puerto Morelos, Quintana Roo
15:00	Guzmán 44'	Report	Rabadán 79'	Stadium: Unidad Deportiva Colonia Pescadores; Attendance: 400; Referee: (Mexico) Mario Terrazas

===== Second leg =====
3 December 2017	Tlaxcala F.C.	0–1 (1–2 agg.)	Yalmakán	Tlaxcala City, Tlaxcala
17:00		Report	Valentín 74'	Stadium: Estadio Tlahuicole; Attendance: 6,000; Referee: (Mexico) Gustavo Padilla

Apertura 2017 winners

2nd title

== Torneo Clausura ==
=== Regular season ===
==== Group 1 ====
===== Standings =====
Pos	Team	Pld	W	D	L	GF	GA	GD	Pts	Qualification
1	UdeG Premier	13	10	3	0	23	7	+16	35	Advance to Liguilla
2	Zacatecas Premier	13	10	2	1	30	16	+14	34	Advance to Liguilla
3	Inter San Miguel	13	6	4	3	23	14	+9	24	Advance to Liguilla
4	Celaya Premier	13	6	5	2	25	19	+6	24	Advance to Liguilla
5	Correcaminos Premier	13	7	2	4	22	18	+4	23	
6	CAFESSA	13	6	1	6	17	15	+2	19	
7	Sahuayo	13	5	2	6	13	15	−2	17	
8	Dorados Premier	13	3	6	4	16	15	+1	16	
9	Constructores	13	3	5	5	22	26	−4	16	
10	Tuzos UAZ	13	4	2	7	18	23	−5	14	
11	Cimarrones Premier	13	3	3	7	14	22	−8	13	
12	Calor	13	3	1	9	9	22	−13	11	
13	Mineros de Fresnillo	13	2	4	7	15	23	−8	10	
14	Atlético Saltillo Soccer	13	1	4	8	14	26	−12	8	

Updated to match(es) played on April 1, 2018. Source: SoccerWay

===== Results =====
Home \ Away	ATS	CAF	CAL	CEL	CIM	COR	CGP	DOR	ISM	MFR	SAH	UAZ	UDG	ZAS
Atlético Saltillo Soccer				1–1			3–3	0–0	0–4				1–2	1–2
CAFESSA	2–1		1–0					2–0	4–1	2–0	1–2			1–2
Calor	0–2			0–1	3–2	2–1	0–0					1–2	0–2	
Celaya		2–1			2–1				2–2	3–2	4–1			1–1
Cimarrones	3–1	0–1						1–1	1–2	1–0	2–0			3–3
Correcaminos	3–1	3–1		3–2	2–0		2–1					3–2	1–1	
Constructores		1–0		3–3	3–0					2–2	1–2		1–1	
Dorados			0–2	2–2		4–1	6–2					2–1	0–1	
Inter San Miguel			4–0			1–2	1–0	1–1				3–0		0–1
Mineros Fresnillo	1–1		1–0			0–0		0–0	2–3		2–0			3–5
Sahuayo	2–0		4–0			1–0		0–0	1–1			0–1		0–2
Tuzos UAZ	3–2	1–1		0–1	0–0		2–3			3–0			1–3	
UdeG		2–0		2–1	4–0				0–0	3–2	1–0			
Zacatecas			2–1			2–1	4–2	2–0				4–2	0–1	

Updated to match(es) played on 1 April 2018. Source: SoccerWay
Legend: Blue = home team win; Yellow = draw; Red = away team win.

==== Group 2 ====
===== Standings =====
Pos	Team	Pld	W	D	L	GF	GA	GD	Pts	Qualification or relegation
1	Albinegros de Orizaba	13	8	5	0	29	6	+23	33	Advance to Liguilla
2	Yalmakán	13	9	3	1	30	8	+22	31	Advance to Liguilla
3	Chapulineros de Oaxaca	13	7	5	1	30	12	+18	31	Advance to Liguilla
4	Ciervos	13	7	3	3	23	20	+3	24	Advance to Liguilla
5	Tlaxcala	13	4	8	1	27	12	+15	23	
6	Zitácuaro	13	6	4	3	18	13	+5	23	
7	Deportivo Chimalhuacán	13	5	4	4	13	13	0	19	
8	Ocelotes UNACH	13	3	5	5	17	16	+1	18	
9	Tecamachalco	13	4	4	5	14	13	+1	17	
10	Deportivo Gladiadores	13	3	5	5	13	22	−9	15	
11	Cuautla	13	4	2	7	16	14	+2	14	
12	Isleños del Carmen	13	4	2	7	11	17	−6	14	
13	FC Satélites	13	2	0	11	12	33	−21	6	
14	Cuatetes de Acapulco	13	0	0	13	0	54	−54	0	Relegated to Tercera División

Updated to match(es) played on April 1, 2018. Source: SoccerWay

===== Results =====
Home \ Away	ALB	CHA	CIE	CTA	CUA	DCH	GLA	FCS	ISL	OUC	TEC	TLA	YAL	ZIT
Albinegros de Orizaba			4–1			0–0	3–1	2–0			3–0	2–2		2–0
Chapulineros de Oaxaca	1–1		4–4	8–0	2–1					0–0			1–2	
Ciervos				3–0			3–0	4–3	2–0	0–3		0–3		
Cuatetes de Acapulco	0–7				0–3		0–2		0–3			0–10	0–3	
Cuautla	1–1		0–1				2–3				3–0	0–0	3–1	1–2
Dep. Chimalhuacán		0–2	1–1	3–0	1–0					2–1			1–1	
Dep. Gladiadores		0–2				1–1		1–0			0–0	2–2		1–1
FC Satélites		0–2		3–0		2–1				0–2	1–3			0–2
Isleños del Carmen	0–2	1–2			1–0	1–2	1–0	3–1				0–0	0–2	
Ocelotes UNACH	0–2			3–0	0–1		2–2		1–1				1–1	
Tecamachalco		0–0	1–2	3–0		0–1			3–0	2–0				
Tlaxcala		1–1				2–0		2–1		2–2	1–1			0–0
Yalmakán	0–0		0–1		2–1		5–0	8–0			2–1	3–2		
Zitácuaro		2–5	1–1	3–0		2–0			2–0	3–2			0–1	

Updated to match(es) played on 1 April 2018. Source: SoccerWay
Legend: Blue = home team win; Yellow = draw; Red = away team win.

=== Regular season statistics ===
==== Scoring ====
- First goal of the season: Jesús López (Dorados Premier)

==== Top goalscorers ====
Players sorted first by goals scored, then by last name.

Rank	Player	Club	Goals
1	(Mexico) Yaír García	Inter San Miguel	16
2	(Mexico) Carlo Yael Vázquez	Albinegros de Orizaba	15
3	(Mexico) Alejandro Reyes	Constructores	9
4	(Mexico) Sergio Flores	Zacatecas	8
5	(Mexico) Fernando Villalpando	Zacatecas	7

Source: Liga Premier

=== Attendance ===
==== Per team ====
Pos	Team	Total	High	Low	Average	Change
1	Isleños del Carmen	6,800	2,000	300	850	+240.0%
2	Tlaxcala	3,500	1,000	300	583	−60.4%^{1}
3	Sahuayo	3,750	1,200	100	536	−2.5%
4	Mineros de Fresnillo	3,519	2,000	100	503	+11.8%
5	Tecamachalco	3,000	1,500	100	500	+224.7%
6	Atlético Saltillo Soccer	2,259	700	200	377	−57.8%
7	Albinegros de Orizaba	2,450	1,500	50	350	−71.4%^{2}
8	Zitácuaro	2,000	500	200	333	+8.1%
9	Chapulineros de Oaxaca	1,700	1,000	100	283	−3.4%
10	Zacatecas Premier	1,500	300	100	250	−69.3%
11	Yalmakán	1,620	300	200	231	−23.0%
12	Cuautla	1,450	300	0	207	−34.7%^{3}
13	Inter San Miguel	1,200	300	150	200	−68.2%
14	Ciervos	975	300	75	195	−48.5%
15	CAFESSA	1,350	400	100	193	−7.2%
16	Dorados Premier	1,100	500	100	183	+34.6%
17	Ocelotes UNACH	900	200	100	180	−59.4%
18	Celaya Premier	1,050	250	100	175	+11.5%
19	Cimarrones Premier	1,100	300	100	157	+45.4%
20	Deportivo Gladiadores	850	200	50	142	+4.4%
21	Constructores	770	200	100	128	−28.5%
22	Deportivo Chimalhuacán	640	200	100	128	−42.1%
23	Tuzos UAZ	750	200	50	107	−33.1%
24	Correcaminos Premier	700	150	50	100	−25.9%
25	Cuatetes de Acapulco	300	200	50	100	−30.1%
26	Calor	650	200	50	93	−2.1%
27	UdeG Premier	550	100	50	92	−12.4%
28	FC Satélites	440	100	40	88	−41.3%
	League total	46,873	2,000	0	269	−27.9%

Updated to games played on 1 April 2018
Source: Liga Premier FMF (available in each game report)
Notes:
Only regular season listed
1: Moved from Tlaxcala City to Santa Ana Chiautempan.
2: Moved from Orizaba to Veracruz City.
3: Moved from Cuautla to Oaxtepec.

==== Highest and lowest ====
Highest attendance					Lowest attendance			
Week	Home	Score	Away	Attendance	Home	Score	Away	Attendance
1	Isleños del Carmen	1–0	Cuautla	1,300	FC Satélites	2–1	Deportivo Chimalhuacán	40
2	Albinegros de Orizaba	2–0	FC Satélites	1,500	Tuzos UAZ	0–1	Celaya Premier	50
3	Isleños del Carmen	0–2	Orizaba	2,000	F.C. Satélites	0–2	Chapulineros de Oaxaca	50
4	Mineros de Fresnillo	1–0	Calor	2,000	Deportivo Gladiadores	1–0	FC Satélites	50
5	Tecamachalco	0–0	Chapulineros de Oaxaca	500	Correcaminos Premier	3–1	Atlético Saltillo Soccer	50
6	Chapulineros de Oaxaca	1–2	Yalmakán	1,000	UdeG Premier	2–1	Celaya Premier	100
7	Cuautla	1–1	Albinegros de Orizaba	500	Cimarrones Premier	1–2	Inter San Miguel	100
8	Tlaxcala	1-1	Tecamachalco	700	Constructores	1–0	CAFESSA	100
9	Isleños del Carmen	3–1	FC Satélites	500	Correcaminos Premier	2–1	Constructores	50
10	Tlaxcala	0–0	Zitácuaro	500	Ciervos	2-0	Isleños del Carmen	75
11	Sahuayo	2–0	Atlético Saltillo Soccer	600	Cuautla	0–0	Tlaxcala	0
12	Tecamachalco	1–2	Ciervos	1,500	UdeG Premier	3–2	Mineros de Fresnillo	50
13	Mineros de Fresnillo	3–5	Zacatecas Premier	600	Cuautla	3–1	FC Satélites	0

Source:Liga Premier FMF (available in each game report)

=== Liguilla ===
The four best teams of each group play two games against each other on a home-and-away basis. The higher seeded teams play on their home field during the second leg. The winner of each match up is determined by aggregate score. In the quarterfinals and semifinals, if the two teams are tied on aggregate the higher seeded team advances. In the final, if the two teams are tied after both legs, the match goes to extra time and, if necessary, a penalty shoot-out.

Quarter-finals
1	UdeG Premier	0	2	2
8	Ciervos	0	0	0
4	Yalmakán	0	2	2
5	Chapulineros	5	2	7
2	Zacatecas Premier	1	4	5
7	Celaya Premier	2	0	2
3	Albinegros	0	3	3
6	Inter San Miguel	1	1	2

Semi-finals
1	UdeG Premier (*)	0	1	1
5	Chapulineros	1	0	1
2	Zacatecas Premier	1	1	2
3	Albinegros	4	1	5

Final
1	UdeG Premier	1	0	1
3	Albinegros	3	3	6

(*) Team was classified by its position in the season table

==== Quarter-finals ====
The first leg was played on 6, 7 and 8 April, and the second leg was played on 14 and 15 April 2018.

Team 1	Agg.	Team 2	1st leg	2nd leg
UdeG Premier	2–0	Ciervos	0–0	2–0
Yalmakán	2–7	Chapulineros de Oaxaca	0–5	2–2
Zacatecas Premier	5–2	Celaya Premier	1–2	4–0
Albinegros de Orizaba	3–2	Inter San Miguel	0–1	3–1

===== First leg =====
6 April 2018	Chapulineros de Oaxaca	5–0	Yalmakán	Oaxaca City, Oaxaca
17:00	López 17'; Navarrete 30', 43'; Manzanares 50'; Hernández 85'	Report		Stadium: Estadio Tecnológico de Oaxaca; Attendance: 800; Referee: (Mexico) Maximiliano Quintero

7 April 2018	Ciervos	0–0	UdeG Premier	Chalco, State of Mexico
16:00		Report		Stadium: Estadio Arreola; Attendance: 400; Referee: (Mexico) Alan Pérez

8 April 2018	Celaya Premier	2–1	Zacatecas Premier	Celaya, Guanajuato
12:00	Dueñas 29'; China 57'	Report	Villalpando 24'	Stadium: Estadio Miguel Alemán Valdés; Attendance: 300; Referee: (Mexico) Moisés Clement

8 April 2018	Inter San Miguel	1–0	Albinegros de Orizaba	San Miguel de Allende, Guanajuato
17:00	García 82'	Report		Stadium: Estadio José María "Capi" Correa Téllez; Attendance: 2,000; Referee: (Mexico) Kevin Contreras

===== Second leg =====
14 April 2018	UdeG Premier	2–0 (2–0 agg.)	Ciervos	Ameca, Jalisco
16:00	Guzmán 33'; Acevedo 84'	Report		Stadium: Núcleo Deportivo y de Espectáculos; Attendance: 200; Referee: (Mexico) Eduardo Vázquez

14 April 2018	Zacatecas Premier	4–0 (5–2 agg.)	Celaya Premier	Tlaltenango, Zacatecas
16:00	Gómez 34'; Villalpando 61', 80'; Pinedo 78'	Report		Stadium: Campo Deportivo La Alberca; Attendance: 300; Referee: (Mexico) Juan Canales

14 April 2018	Albinegros de Orizaba	3–1 (3–2 agg.)	Inter San Miguel	Veracruz City, Veracruz
17:00	Pool 30'; Prieto 34'; Martínez 37'	Report	López 15'	Stadium: Estadio Luis "Pirata" Fuente; Attendance: 300; Referee: (Mexico) Héctor García

15 April 2018	Yalmakán	2–2 (2–7 agg.)	Chapulineros de Oaxaca	Puerto Morelos, Quintana Roo
16:00	Pelayo 78'; Lara 83' (o.g.)	Report	Navarrete 45'; Lara 63'	Stadium: Unidad Deportiva Colonia Pescadores; Attendance: 400; Referee: (Mexico) Luis Chávez

==== Semi-finals ====
The first leg was played on 18 April, and the second leg was played on 21 April 2018.

Team 1	Agg.	Team 2	1st leg	2nd leg
UdeG Premier	1–1	Chapulineros de Oaxaca	0–1	1–0
Zacatecas Premier	2–5	Albinegros de Orizaba	1–4	1–1

===== First leg =====
18 April 2018	Chapulineros de Oaxaca	1–0	UdeG Premier	Oaxaca City, Oaxaca
17:00	Hernández 44'	Report		Stadium: Estadio Tecnológico de Oaxaca; Attendance: 1,200; Referee: (Mexico) Maximiliano Quintero

18 April 2018	Albinegros de Orizaba	4–1	Zacatecas Premier	Veracruz City, Veracruz
17:00	Vázquez 47', 89'; Velasco 89'; Prieto 90+1'	Report	Villalpando 40'	Stadium: Estadio Luis "Pirata" Fuente; Attendance: 250; Referee: (Mexico) Moisés Clement

===== Second leg =====
21 April 2018	UdeG Premier	1–0 (1–1 agg.)	Chapulineros de Oaxaca	Ameca, Jalisco
16:00	Alcaráz 82'	Report		Stadium: Núcleo Deportivo y de Espectáculos; Attendance: 150; Referee: (Mexico) Héctor García

21 April 2018	Zacatecas Premier	1–1 (2–5 agg.)	Albinegros de Orizaba	Tlaltenango, Zacatecas
17:00	Villalpando 66'	Report	Prieto 9'	Stadium: Campo Deportivo La Alberca; Attendance: 400; Referee: (Mexico) Juan Canales

==== Final ====
The first leg was played on 25 April, and the second leg was played on 28 April 2018.

Team 1	Agg.	Team 2	1st leg	2nd leg
UdeG Premier	1–6	Albinegros de Orizaba	1–3	0–3

===== First leg =====
25 April 2018	Albinegros de Orizaba	3–1	UdeG Premier	Veracruz City, Veracruz
19:00	Prieto 37'; Vázquez 61', 83'	Report	Ascencio 75'	Stadium: Estadio Luis "Pirata" Fuente; Attendance: 10,500; Referee: (Mexico) Héctor García

===== Second leg =====
28 April 2018	UdeG Premier	0–3 (1–6 agg.)	Albinegros de Orizaba	Guadalajara, Jalisco
17:00		Report	Chavala 70'; Prieto 73'; Vázquez 82'	Stadium: Estadio Jalisco; Attendance: 2,000; Referee: (Mexico) Juan Canales

Clausura 2018 winners

1st title

== Relegation Table ==
P	Team	Pts	G	Pts/G
1	Zacatecas Premier	67	26	2.5769
2	Albinegros de Orizaba	66	26	2.5385
3	Tlaxcala	59	26	2.2692
4	UdeG Premier	58	26	2.2308
5	Yalmakán	58	26	2.2308
6	Chapulineros de Oaxaca	55	26	2.1154
7	Correcaminos Premier	48	26	1.8462
8	Inter San Miguel	47	26	1.8077
9	Deportivo Chimalhuacán	45	26	1.7308
10	Deportivo Zitácuaro	41	26	1.5769
11	Celaya Premier	40	26	1.5385
12	Dorados Premier	40	26	1.5385
13	Ocelotes UNACH	37	26	1.4231
14	Tuzos UAZ	36	26	1.3846
15	Ciervos	36	26	1.3846
16	Deportivo Gladiadores	35	26	1.3462
17	Cuautla	33	26	1.2692
18	Sahuayo	33	26	1.2692
19	Tecamachalco	32	26	1.2308
20	Atlético Saltillo Soccer	32	26	1.2308
21	CAFESSA	28	26	1.0769
22	Calor	27	26	1.0385
23	Constructores	27	26	1.0385
24	Mineros de Fresnillo	25	26	0.9615
25	Isleños del Carmen	22	26	0.8462
26	Cimarrones Premier	16	26	0.6154
27	FC Satélites	13	26	0.5000
28	Cuatetes de Acapulco	7	26	0.2692

Last updated: 1 April 2018
Source: Liga Premier FMF
P = Position; G = Games played; Pts = Points; Pts/G = Ratio of points to games played

== Promotion Final ==
The Promotion Final is a series of matches played by the champions of the tournaments Apertura and Clausura, the game is played to determine the winning team of the promotion to Serie A. The first leg was played on 3 May 2018, and the second leg was played on 6 May 2018.

Team 1	Agg.	Team 2	1st leg	2nd leg
Albinegros de Orizaba	1–3	Yalmakán	0–2	1–1

=== First leg ===
3 May 2018	Yalmakán	2–0	Albinegros de Orizaba	Puerto Morelos, Quintana Roo
16:00	Guzmán 16'; Navarro 30'	Report		Stadium: Unidad Deportiva Colonia Pescadores; Attendance: 480; Referee: (Mexico) Héctor García

=== Second leg ===
6 May 2018	Albinegros de Orizaba	1–1 (1–3 agg.)	Yalmakán	Veracruz City, Veracruz
16:00	Ramírez 78'	Report	Navarro 51'	Stadium: Estadio Luis "Pirata" Fuente; Attendance: 1,500; Referee: (Mexico) Juan Canales

2017–18 Serie B de México winners

2nd title

== See also ==
- 2017–18 Liga MX season
- 2017–18 Ascenso MX season
- 2017–18 Serie A de Mexico season
