= Pedro Vega =

Pedro Vega may refer to:

- Pedro Vega (bishop) (1560–1616), Spanish bishop
- Pedro Vega (born 1958), Mexican footballer
- Pedro Vega Granillo (born 1959), Mexican pianist
- Pedro Vega (born 1979), Spanish footballer

See also:

- Pedro Laso de la Vega (1520–1554), Spanish councilor
- Pedro De la Vega (born 2001), Argentine footballer
