= Obed (name) =

- Gender: Male

Origin
- Word/name: Hebrew
- Meaning: "worshipper"

Obed (Hebrew: עוֹבֵד, romanized: ‘Ōḇēḏ, lit. '"worshipper"') is a given name, following the biblical figure Obed. It may also serve as a surname. Notable people with the name include:

== Given name ==
- Obed Akwa (born 1955), Ghanaian retired lieutenant-general and former Chief of the Defence Staff of the Ghana Armed Forces
- Obed Ariri (born 1956), Nigerian gridiron football placekicker
- Obed Asamoah (born 1936), Ghanaian politician
- Obed Barney (fl. 1843–1844), American politician
- Obed Cétoute (born 1983), Canadian gridiron football player
- Obed Dickinson (1818–1892), American pioneer, abolitionist, minister and business owner
- Obed Dlamini (born 1937), Prime Minister of Swaziland (1989–1993)
- Obed Enamorado (born 1985), Honduran football goalkeeper
- Obed Estrada (born 1994), Mexican footballer
- Obed Gómez (born 1966), Puerto Rican artist
- Obed Hall (1757–1828), American politician and pioneer
- Obed Crosby Haycock (1901–1983), American engineer and educator
- Obed Hussey (1792–1860), American inventor
- Obed Simon Johnson (1881–1970), American academic, chaplain, congregational missionary and student of Chinese culture and history
- Obed Macy (1801–1857), American physician, pioneer and politician
- Obed Martínez (born 1996), Mexican footballer
- Obed McCoy (born 1997), Vincentian cricketer
- Obed Mlaba, mayor of the eThekwini, South Africa
- Obed Mutanya (born 1981), Zambian long-distance and cross-country runner
- Obed Nicholls (1885–1962), Cornish artist
- Obed Owusu (born 1990), Ghanaian footballer
- Obed Psych, stage name of Ghanaian Canadian singer Obed Awelinga-Nzuh
- Obed Rincón (born 1985), Mexican footballer
- Obed F. Strickland (1833–1887), justice of the Supreme Court of the Utah Territory
- Obed Sullivan (born 1968), American boxer
- Obed Taylor (1824–1881), American architect
- Obed Vargas (born 2005), American soccer player
- Obed Wheeler (1841–1898), American businessman and politician

== Surname ==
- Elisha Obed (born 1952), Bahamanian boxer
- Rhema Obed (born 1991), English footballer
- Z. Obed (died 2020), Indian politician

== See also ==
- Obed (disambiguation)
- Oved, a spelling variant of the name
