= Edmundo Ríos =

Mexican footballer (born 1979)

Personal information
- Full name: Edmundo Emmanuel Ríos Jáuregui
- Date of birth: 12 May 1979 (age 47)
- Place of birth: Mexico City, Mexico
- Height: 1.81 m (5 ft 11 1/2 in)
- Position: Goalkeeper

Senior career*
Years	Team	Apps	(Gls)
2000	América	0	(0)
2002–2004	San Luis	33	(0)
2005–2006	América	0	(0)
2006	Tampico Madero	1	(0)
2006	San Luis	0	(0)
2007	Tampico Madero	20	(0)
2008	Salamanca	4	(0)
2008	Tampico Madero	13	(0)
2009	Tecos UAG	3	(0)
2009–2010	San Luis	0	(0)
2010–2011	Alacranes de Durango	31	(0)
2011–2014	Celaya	24	(0)
2014–2015	Atlético San Luis	13	(0)
2015–2016	Cafetaleros de Tapachula	15	(0)

Managerial career
- 2017: Inter San Miguel
- 2018: Inter San Miguel (Assistant)
- 2018–2019: Potosino
- 2019: Salamanca
- * Club domestic league appearances and goals

Edmundo Emmanuel Ríos Jáuregui (Note: In this Spanish name, the first or paternal surname is Ríos and the second or maternal family name is Jáuregui.) (born 12 May 1979) is a former Mexican professional footballer who played for Tapachula of Ascenso MX on loan from Celaya.
