= Ernesto Sosa =

Mexican footballer and manager (born 1962)

Personal information
- Full name: Ernesto Sosa Valadéz
- Date of birth: 1 March 1962 (age 64)
- Place of birth: Aguascalientes City, Aguascalientes, Mexico
- Height: 1.70 m (5 ft 7 in)
- Position: Defender

Senior career*
Years	Team	Apps	(Gls)
1982–1983	Oaxtepec	22	(0)
1986–1987	Irapuato	12	(0)
1987–1989	UAT	46	(0)
1989–1990	Santos Laguna	22	(1)
1990–1991	Monarcas Morelia	2	(1)
1991–1992	Cobras de Ciudad Juárez	5	(0)

Managerial career
- 2003: Celaya (Interim)
- 2004: Alacranes de Durango (Assistant)
- 2004: Alacranes de Durango
- 2004: Alacranes de Durango (Assistant)
- 2005: Mérida (Assistant)
- 2005: Petroleros de Salamanca (Assistant)
- 2010–2011: Alacranes de Durango (Assistant)
- 2015: Celaya Premier
- 2015: Irapuato
- 2015: Celaya (Interim)
- 2016: Irapuato
- 2018: Inter San Miguel
- * Club domestic league appearances and goals

Ernesto Sosa Valadéz (born March 1, 1962) is a Mexican football manager and former player.
