= Oved =

Oved (Hebrew: עובד, Oved) is a Jewish surname and given name, a spelling variant of the biblical name Obed, the grandfather of Israel's King David. In Hebrew, the word means "to work" and is often used in a biblical context to denote a "worker of God." Notable people with the name include:

== Surname ==
- Avi Oved, American university administrator
- Gil Oved, South African entrepreneur
- Margalit Oved, American-Israeli dancer and choreographer
- Reuven Oved, Israeli former professional footballer
- Yaacov Oved, Israeli historian

== Given name ==
- Oved Ben-Ami (1905–1988), Israeli politician

== See also ==
- Obed (name)
