= Saltillo F.C. =

Mexican football club

- Full name: Saltillo Fútbol Club
- Founded: 24 July 2019; 7 years ago
- Dissolved: June 2024; 2 years ago
- Ground: Estadio de Béisbol Francisco I. Madero; Saltillo, Coahuila
- Capacity: 12,000
- Owner: Miguel Gilgardo Becerril
- Chairman: Miguel Gilgardo Becerril
- League: Liga Premier - Serie A
- 2023–24: 11th, Group II
Home colours	Away colours

Saltillo Fútbol Club, commonly known as Saltillo F.C., was a Mexican football club based in Saltillo, Coahuila that competed in the Liga Premier - Serie A, the third level division of Mexican football.

== History ==
=== Origins ===
The club was founded in June 2017 as Atlético Saltillo Soccer through an alliance between the clubs Atlético Allende and Saltillo Soccer, the second team maintained a franchise called Titanes de Saltillo, which had been relegated from the Liga Premier de Ascenso, so it finally merged with the Atlético project. At first, it was sought that Atletico Saltillo played in the Serie A, however, was finally placed in the Serie B to not have the necessary requirements for the category of higher level.

On August 11, 2017, the first match of the club was played, tying with Club Calor by 0–0. At the end of the regular season of the Apertura 2017, the team qualified for the playoffs, being eliminated by Coyotes de Tlaxcala in the quarterfinal round. In the 2018-19 season, the team qualified again for the promotion playoffs.

For the 2019–2020 season, the Segunda División de México allowed the promotion of several Serie B teams to the Serie A to cover some spaces left after the departure of five Primera División de México clubs reserve teams. On June 28, 2019, the entry of Atlético Saltillo Soccer in the category was confirmed. After confirming the participation of the team in the Serie A, they began talks to create a single club that represents the city of Saltillo.

=== Saltillo F.C. ===
On July 24, 2019, Atlético Saltillo Soccer and the Saltillo Soccer franchise merged to create a new team called Saltillo F.C. However, the team was officially called Atlético Saltillo Soccer during the 2019–2020 season. In 2020, the team was recognised by the Federación Mexicana de Fútbol (FMF) as Saltillo F.C. The team only managed to qualify for the Serie A play-offs in the Apertura 2021.

In 2023, the team began to be managed by a new board headed by the Mardones brothers, which seemed like a sign of improvement for the club. However, this administration abandoned the club in mid-2024, beginning a financial crisis for Saltillo F.C. As a result, the team requested a hiatus for the 2024–25 season. Saltillo F.C. was not reactivated for the 2025–26 season and was officially dissolved in accordance with the league regulations.

== Year-by-year ==
Season	Division	Group	Position	Record (W–D–L)	Notes
2019–20	Liga Premier – Serie A	Group I	9th	10–5–9	Season officially recorded despite COVID-19 suspension.
2020–21	Liga Premier – Serie A	Group I	10th	4–8–10	Full season completed.
2021–22	Liga Premier – Serie A	Group I	3rd	6–2–5	Qualified for playoffs; eliminated in quarterfinals.
2022–23	Liga Premier – Serie A	Group II	4th	5–2–3	Finished with 19 points.
2023–24	Liga Premier – Serie A	Group I	11th	11–12–9	Finished with 46 points.

== Stadium ==
- Estadio Olímpico Francisco I. Madero, Saltillo, Coahuila, Mexico (2019–2024)

== Managers ==
- (Mexico) Francisco Javier Gamboa (2019-2020)
- (Mexico) Ricardo López Estrada (2020)
- (Mexico) Jair García (2020–2023)
- (Mexico) Omar Arellano (2023)
- (Mexico) Isaac Saldívar (2024)
