= Obed =

Obed may refer to:

== Geography ==
- Obed, Alberta, Canada, an unincorporated community
- Obed, Croatia, a settlement in Orle, Croatia
- Obed, Arizona, United States, a ghost town
- Obed River, Tennessee, United States

== People ==
- Obed (name), a list of people with the given name or surname

== Other uses ==
- Obed (biblical figure), son of Boaz and Ruth
- Obed Monastery a Serbian Orthodox monastery

== See also ==
- Obed Summit, Alberta, Canada, a highway summit
- Obed Lake Provincial Park, Alberta
- Little Obed River, Tennessee
- Obed-Edom, meaning "servant of Edom", one or possibly two figures mentioned in the Bible
