= Francisco Javier Gamboa =

Mexican association football player

Personal information
- Full name: Francisco Javier Gamboa Chávez
- Date of birth: 18 September 1978 (age 48)
- Place of birth: Chihuahua City, Chihuahua, Mexico
- Height: 1.78 m (5 ft 10 in)

Managerial career
- Years: Team
- 2008–2009: Dorados Inter
- 2011–2014: UACH
- 2014: UACH (Assistant)
- 2015–2018: UACH
- 2018: UACH (Assistant)
- 2019–2020: Saltillo
- 2022–2024: Chihuahua (Assistant)

Francisco Javier Gamboa Chávez (born September 18, 1978) is a Mexican football manager.
