= Diego López (footballer, born 1983) =

Mexican footballer and manager

Personal information
- Full name: Diego López Aguilar
- Date of birth: 13 November 1983 (age 42)
- Place of birth: Chihuahua City, Mexico
- Height: 1.80 m (5 ft 11 in)
- Position: Defender

Team information
- Current team: Atlético San Luis U-19 (Assistant)

Senior career*
Years	Team	Apps	(Gls)
2008	Indios	1	(0)

Managerial career
- 2011–2016: UACH (assistant)
- 2016–2019: UACH
- 2022–2023: Chihuahua
- 2023–: Atlético San Luis Reserves and Academy
- * Club domestic league appearances and goals

Diego López Aguilar (born 13 November 1983) is a Mexican football manager and former professional footballer who played as a defender. He recently was the manager of Chihuahua F.C.

== Career ==
López made his professional football debut during the 2008–09 Primera División A season, appearing in a fixture against eventual champions Querétaro on 16 November 2008 which Indios lost 2–4. After retirement, in 2011, López became assistant manager to Alberto González at UACH. In August 2016, after five years in the role, López was made manager after González's departure. His first match in charge was a Liga Premier loss to Monterrey Premier on 14 August. López moved into the role of sporting director in June 2019.

== Career statistics ==
Club statistics
Club	Season	League			Cup		Continental		Other		Total	
Club	Season	Division	Apps	Goals	Apps	Goals	Apps	Goals	Apps	Goals	Apps	Goals
Indios	2008–09	Primera División A	1	0	0	0	—		0	0	1	0
Career total			1	0	0	0	—		0	0	1	0

== Managerial statistics ==
As of 26 May 2022.

Managerial record by team and tenure
Team	From	To	Record					Ref
Team	From	To	P	W	D	L	Win %	Ref
UACH	11 August 2016	11 June 2019	97	35	29	33	36.1	
Chihuahua FC	26 May 2022	Present	0	0	0	0	—	
Total			97	35	29	33	36.1	—
