= Cuatetes de Acapulco =

Mexican football club

- Full name: Cuatetes de Acapulco Fútbol Club
- Nickname(s): Los Cuatetes (The channel catfishes)
- Founded: 2016; 9 years ago
- Dissolved: 8 March 2018
- Ground: Unidad Deportiva Acapulco, Acapulco, Guerrero, Mexico
- Capacity: 13,000
- Clausura 2018: Withdrawn then Regulated
Home colours	Away colours

The Cuatetes de Acapulco Fútbol Club, commonly known as Cuatetes, was a Mexican football club based in Acapulco. The club was founded in 2016, and played in the Serie B of Liga Premier.

== Players ==
=== Current squad ===
Note: Flags indicate national team as defined under FIFA eligibility rules; some limited exceptions apply. Players may hold more than one non-FIFA nationality.

No.	Pos.	Nation	Player
3	MF	(Mexico) MEX	Aldair Arellano
4	DF	(Mexico) MEX	Julio Rodríguez
5	DF	(Mexico) MEX	Jonathan Campos
6	MF	(Mexico) MEX	Ignacio Muñoz
8	MF	(Mexico) MEX	Diego Merino
10	MF	(Mexico) MEX	Roberto Sotelo
11	FW	(Mexico) MEX	Bertin Herrera
12	GK	(Mexico) MEX	Raúl Veldáñez
13	DF	(Mexico) MEX	Marcial Abarca
14	MF	(Mexico) MEX	Jorge Hernández
15	MF	(Mexico) MEX	Aldair Cruz

No.	Pos.	Nation	Player
17	MF	(Mexico) MEX	Edgar Martell
18	MF	(Mexico) MEX	Orlando Cruz
19	DF	(Mexico) MEX	Cristian Rico
21	DF	(Mexico) MEX	José Rodríguez
22	DF	(Mexico) MEX	Maxel Alvarado
23	DF	(Mexico) MEX	Sergio Mejía
24	MF	(Mexico) MEX	Leonel Flores
25	GK	(Mexico) MEX	Neftalí Rentería
26	DF	(Mexico) MEX	Milton Quiroz
49	MF	(Mexico) MEX	Eduardo Soria
50	FW	(Mexico) MEX	Jesús Gallardo
