= Marco Marroquín =

Mexican footballer and manager (born 1977)

Personal information
- Full name: Marco Antonio Marroquín Tierrablanca
- Date of birth: 14 June 1977 (age 49)
- Place of birth: Mexico City, Mexico
- Height: 1.74 m (5 ft 8 1/2 in)
- Position: Defender

Team information
- Current team: Dorados de Sinaloa (Liga TDP) (Assistant)

Senior career*
Years	Team	Apps	(Gls)
2003	Lagartos de Tabasco	1	(0)
2006	Delfines de Coatzacoalcos	60	(4)
2007–2008	Lagartos de Tabasco	10	(0)
2009	Guerreros de Tabasco	7	(0)
2009–2011	Tijuana	32	(1)

Managerial career
- 2011–2015: Tijuana Reserves and Academy
- 2015–2017: Dorados de Sinaloa Reserves and Academy
- 2017–2020: Dorados de Sinaloa Premier
- 2020–: Dorados de Sinaloa (Liga TDP) (Assistant)
- * Club domestic league appearances and goals

Marco Antonio Marroquín Tierrablanca (born June 14, 1977) is a Mexican football manager and former player.
