= Pedro Vega Granillo =

Mexican pianist

Pedro Vega Granillo is a pianist born in Hermosillo, Sonora, Mexico in 1959. His musical career began at age ten studying under Matilde Katase, then with Emiliana de Zubeldia, when he demonstrated his aptitude. In 1980, he debuted at a concert at the Palacio de Bellas Artes in Mexico City, playing the complicated pieces of Zubeldía and other classical works. His success here prompted his university studies in the piano. In 1987, he received his first recognition at the Segundo Concurso Nacional de Piano, and in 1988, he debuted with the Orquesta Sinfónica del Estado de México. In addition to giving performances, Vega began a classical trio of piano, violin and violoncello at the Universidad de Sonora. Today, he is a professor at the same institution.
