= Obed Gómez =

Puerto Rican artist

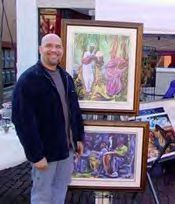
- Obed Gómez
- Born: Obed Gómez; 1966 (age 59–60); Santurce, Puerto Rico
- Education: Andres Buseo Academy
- Known for: Painting
- Movement: Modern art
- Awards: Paoli Award in the Visual Arts Category (2004)

Obed Gómez a.k.a. "The Puerto Rican Picasso" (born 1966) is a Puerto Rican artist of modern art.

== Early years ==
Gómez was born and raised in Santurce, a section of in San Juan, the capital city of Puerto Rico. His grandmother was the first to believe that someday he would become an artist when she saw him drawing at the age of three. He received his primary education in a public school, however when he was eleven he took private art classes. He was sent to the League of Art of San Juan, where he took classes in drawing and painting.

After Gómez graduated from high school, he enrolled in the University of the Sacred Heart in San Juan. He also studied simultaneously at the Andres Buseo Academy where he took art classes. He earned his bachelor's degree in Communications with a minor in visual arts from the University of the Sacred Heart.

At first he was not successful as an artist and instead he faced personal problems which kept him from fulfilling his potential as an artist. His life changed when he moved to Orlando, Florida in 1995 and met his future wife Sarah Lloyd. Sarah encouraged him by insisting that he accompany her to art shows. She inspired him by telling him that he too could produce works of art. He also became a born again Christian. Gomez set up an art studio in a spare room of his home.

== Artistic style ==
Gomez developed a style which ranges from vividly realistic to wildly abstract, with a lot of luscious whimsy in between. His subjects may vary from a dancer to a rooster with the colors of the Puerto Rican flag. The culture and heritage of Puerto Rico are represented in many of his paintings. Gomez's trademark is the bold and bright hues he favors. His art work have appeared on the covers of the Puerto Rican Professional and Business Leaders Guide, the brochure for Orlando's Puerto Rican Parade and O! Arts Magazine.

== Exhibitions ==
Rooster by Obed Gomez

His art work was exhibited at the Galeria Latina in Cornwall, England where a critic nicknamed him the "Puerto Rican Picasso". His work has also been exhibited at the following places:

=== Solo exhibitions ===
- 1995 - Universidad del Sagrado Corazon, Santurce, PR
- 1999 - Puerto Rican Parade Art Exhibit, Orlando, Florida 99
- 1999 - Sears Art Exhibit, Orlando, Florida
- 1999 - Lockheed Martin-Orlando, Florida
- 2000 - Puerto Rican Parade Art Exhibit, Orlando, Florida
- 2001 - Darden's Hispanic Heritage Art Exhibit, Orlando, Florida
- 2001 - Orlando Public Library Art Exhibit, Orlando, Florida
- 2003 - Office of the Governor of Florida, Orlando, Florida
- 2004 - Moore Multicultural Center at Brevard Community College, Cocoa, Florida
- 2004 - Valencia Community College East Campus, Orlando, Florida
- 2005 - "Childhood Memories" Art Exhibit, Brevard Community College, Cocoa, Florida
- 2005 - "The Colors of Life" Art Exhibit, The House of Arts, Casselberry, Florida
- 2006 - Solo Exhibit, Solo Exhibit Dale Mabry Campus Art Gallery, Tampa, Florida

=== Group exhibitions ===
- 1999 - Latin American Art Exhibition, Valencia Community College-Orlando, Florida
- 2000 - Orange County's Hispanic Art & History Exhibit, Orlando, Fl.
- 2000 - Lockheed Martin-Orlando, Florida
- 2000 - Latin American Art Exhibition, Valencia Community College-Orlando, Florida
- 2000 - Festival Taino 2000, Las Americas Museum of Art - Kissimmee, Florida
- 2000 - Hispanic Heritage Celebration, Lockheed Martin-Orlando, Florida
- 2000 - Orange County's Hispanic Art & History Exhibit, Orlando, Florida
- 2001 - Historical Society of Central Florida Hispanic Art Exhibit Orlando, Florida
- 2001 - Hispanic Heritage Art Exhibit 2001 Orlando, Florida
- 2001 - Shin-Dig Orange County Regional History Center Orlando, Florida
- 2001 - Lockheed Martin-Orlando, Florida
- 2001 - Puerto Rican Parade Art Exhibit, Orlando, Florida
- 2001 - Latin American Art Exhibition, Valencia Community College-Orlando, Florida
- 2004- "Travel, Adventure & Motion" Platform #3 Exhibit, Lakeland, Florida
- 2004- "La Dolce Vita Exhibit" 1st Thursdays at The Orlando Museum of Art (OMA), Orlando, Florida
- 2004- Pura Vida Gallery, Atlanta, GA
- 2004- "Colores del Caribe", Casselberry City Hall, Casselberry, Florida
- 2004- Brevard Museum of Art & Science, Melbourne, Florida
- 2004- "The Floridian-Puerto Rican Art Connection" Kissimmee City Hall, Kissimmee, Florida
- 2005- "Hispanic Expressions" Art Exhibit, University of Central Florida (UCF), Orlando, Florida
- 2005- "Presencia Boricua" Art Exhibit, Museum Of The Americas(MoA), Miami, Florida
- 2005- "Latin Fusion", Casselberry City Hall, Casselberry, Florida

== Honors and recognitions ==
In 2003, Gomez was named the godfather of the Melbourne Puerto Rican Day Parade. In 2004 Lifetime Network, choose Gomez's artwork to decorate the set of "Division". In that year, he was also awarded the Paoli Award in the Visual Arts Category.

Even though some of his paintings have sold for over $5,000 (U.S. Dollars), Gomez has donated many of his works to children fund raising auctions. He also created the web page for "Give Kids the World", an organization which grants wishes to children with life-threatening diseases.

== Currently ==
Obed Gomez is currently a graphic designer, painter and a youth art professor. He lives in Orlando with his wife and children.

== See also ==
- List of Puerto Ricans
