= Mineros de Zacatecas Premier =

- Full name: Club Deportivo Mineros de Zacatecas Premier
- Nicknames: Los Mineros (The Miners); Los Rojiverdes (The Green-and-Reds); Los Tricolores (The Tricolors); La Marea Roja (The Crimson Tide)
- Founded: 14 July 2015; 11 years ago
- Dissolved: 2020; 6 years ago
- Ground: Estadio Universitario Unidad Deportiva Norte; Zacatecas, Zacatecas, Mexico
- Capacity: 5,000
- Owner: Grupo Pachuca
- Chairman: Armando Martínez Patiño
- League: Liga Premier - Serie B
- 2019–20: 1st (Tournament abandoned)
| Home colours | Away colours |

Club Deportivo Mineros de Zacatecas Premier was a Mexican football club that played in the Liga Premier - Serie B of the Segunda División de México and was based in the city of Zacatecas, Zacatecas. They were the official reserve team for Mineros de Zacatecas.

== Players ==
=== Current squad ===
As of January 31, 2020
