= Ocelotes UNACH =

Former Mexican football club in Chiapas

- Full name: Club de Fútbol Ocelotes de la Universidad Autónoma de Chiapas
- Nickname: Los Ocelotes (The Ocelots)
- Founded: 2002; 23 years ago
- Dissolved: June 2019; 6 years ago
- Ground: Estadio Municipal de San Cristóbal de las Casas; San Cristóbal de las Casas, Chiapas, Mexico
- Capacity: 4,000
- Owner: UNACH
- Chairman: Juan Guillermo Gutiérrez
- League: Liga Premier - Serie B
- Apertura 2017: 7th, Group II
Home colours	Away colours	Third colours

Club de Fútbol Ocelotes de la Universidad Autónoma de Chiapas, was a Mexican football club that played in the Liga Premier – Serie B. The club was founded in 2002 when there were no professional football clubs in the state of Chiapas. The club played in the town of San Cristóbal de las Casas, Chiapas where they represent the Universidad Autónoma de Chiapas. On June 8, 2015, the team was relocated from Tapachula, Chiapas due a new team in the Ascenso MX.

In June 2019, the directive reached an agreement with Cafetaleros de Chiapas, with this deal Ocelotes UNACH dissolved and became a new team based in Tapachula but being administered and affiliated with the squad of the capital. The new team was placed in Serie A and had the right to promote Ascenso MX.

== Current roster ==
Note: Flags indicate national team as defined under FIFA eligibility rules; some limited exceptions apply. Players may hold more than one non-FIFA nationality.

No.	Pos.	Nation	Player
