= Cocodrilos de Tabasco =

Mexican football club

- Full name: Cocodrilos de Tabasco Fútbol Club
- Nickname(s): Los Cocodrilos (The Crocodiles)
- Founded: 24 November 2017; 7 years ago
- Dissolved: June 2019; 6 years ago
- Ground: Estadio Olímpico de Villahermosa, Villahermosa, Tabasco, Mexico
- Capacity: 10,500
- Owner: Alejandro Mendoza Aguayo
- League: Liga Premier - Serie A
- 2018-19: Preseason
| Home colours | Away colours |

The Cocodrilos de Tabasco Fútbol Club, commonly known as Cocodrilos, was a Mexican football club based in Villahermosa, Tabasco. The club was founded in 2017, and played in the Serie A of Liga Premier.

== History ==
On June 22, 2017, Francisco Negrete Arceo announced the foundation of Isleños del Carmen, and at the same time the sightseeing announcement that would begin the following day.

On September 13, 2017, the board announced the transfer of the team to Villahermosa, Tabasco, after having problems with the original field in Ciudad del Carmen, Campeche.

In July 2018, the team was promoted to Serie A as part of a franchise expansion, so it achieved its promotion automatically. On the other hand, in August of the same year, it was announced that the team would have a subsidiary team in the Tercera División de México during the 2018–19 season.
