= FC Potosino =

Real Potosino
- Full name: Club de Fútbol Real Potosino
- Nicknames: Los Auriazules (Gold and blue players)
- Founded: 9 July 2018; 8 years ago
- Dissolved: 3 July 2019; 7 years ago
- Ground: Estadio Plan de San Luis; San Luis Potosí, San Luis Potosí
- Capacity: 18,000
- Owner(s): UAS; Club Furia Saltillo
- Chairman: Emerson Gálvez
- League: Liga Premier - Serie B
- 2018-19: 9th
Home colours	Away colours

Club de Fútbol Real Potosino was a Mexican football club based in the city of San Luis Potosí, San Luis Potosí that competed in the Liga Premier - Serie B, the third level division of Mexican football.

== History ==
The club was founded on July 9, 2018, after it was announced the relocation of the team Inter San Miguel from San Miguel de Allende, Guanajuato to the city of San Luis Potosí, due to administrative issues on the part of the owners.

However, the team began to suffer economic problems that led to put at risk the future of the franchise. This event caused the players and coaching staff to manage the travel expenses on their own and to report the abandonment by the team executives. Therefore, it was thought to take the franchise to another location.

In February 2019, the team changed management and was renamed as CF Real Potosino, however, the team kept the name FC Potosino in the Federación Mexicana de Fútbol (FMF) register, the team adopted gold and blue colors as part of the new identity and created soccer training schools to bring players to the team.

The new owners of the club tried to create a sports project in Saltillo, Coahuila under the name Club Furia Saltillo, however, they withdrew the offer because there were no sports conditions in that city. Subsequently, the project managers announced that they would seek another location, with the FC Potosino team finally being chosen.

Since the arrival to San Luis Potosí, the team was relegated to a second plane due to the boom and subsequent promotion of Atlético San Luis to the Primera División de México, which caused a low number of fans for Real Potosino, finally, in July 2019, the board reached an agreement to relocate the team to Salamanca, Guanajuato and rename it as Salamanca F.C., however, the new team maintained FC Potosino as its official name, because the agreement was given after the presentation of the participating teams of the season. Finally, the new team was rejected by the league due to a great breach of infrastructure requirements, so the FC Potosino franchise was put on hiatus during the 2019–2020 season and was not reactivated for the 2020-21 season.

== Players ==
=== Current squad ===
Note: Flags indicate national team as defined under FIFA eligibility rules; some limited exceptions apply. Players may hold more than one non-FIFA nationality.

No.	Pos.	Nation	Player
