= Constructores de Gómez Palacio =

Mexican football club

- Full name: Club de Fútbol Constructores de Gómez Palacio
- Nickname(s): Los Constructores (The Builders)
- Founded: August 2014; 10 years ago
- Dissolved: June 2019; 5 years ago
- Ground: Unidad Deportiva Francisco Gómez Palacio, Gómez Palacio, Durango, Mexico
- Capacity: 4,000
- Chairman: Armando Moreno
- League: Liga Premier - Serie B
- 2018-19: Preseason
Home colours	Away colours

The Club de Fútbol Constructores de Gómez Palacio, commonly known as Constructores, was a Mexican football club based in Gómez Palacio. The club was founded in 2014, and played in the Serie B of Liga Premier. In 2019, the club was dissolved due to budget problems.

== History ==
The team was founded in 2014 as a project belonging to the amateur sector of the Mexican Football Federation, in that year they won the Multiversity Cup, a school tournament. In the 2015–16 season the club entered the Third Division of Mexico, the last professional category in the country. In 2017 the team began to participate in the Second Division of Mexico, taking part in Serie B.
