= Pedro Vega (footballer, born 1958) =

Mexican footballer and manager

Personal information
- Full name: Pedro Vega Zambrano
- Date of birth: 29 June 1958 (age 68)
- Place of birth: Mexico City, Mexico
- Height: 1.76 m (5 ft 9 1/2 in)
- Position: Midfielder

Senior career*
| Years | Team | Apps | (Gls) |
| 1978–1979 | América | 20 | (2) |
| 1979–1981 | Toros Neza | 32 | (2) |
| 1986–1987 | Cobras de Ciudad Juárez | 18 | (0) |

Managerial career
- 2007–2018: América Reserves and Academy
- 2018–2019: América Premier
- 2019: América Reserves and Academy
- * Club domestic league appearances and goals

Pedro Vega Zambrano (born June 29, 1958) is a Mexican football manager and former player.
