= Obed Estrada =

Mexican footballer (born 1994)

Personal information
- Full name: Obed Ulises Estrada Mora
- Date of birth: 31 July 1994 (age 32)
- Place of birth: Guadalajara, Jalisco, Mexico
- Height: 1.79 m (5 ft 10 in)
- Position: Forward

Youth career
- 2009–2011: Cachorros U. de G.

Senior career*
Years	Team	Apps	(Gls)
2011–2017	U. de G.	22	(0)
2017–2019	U. de C.	47	(11)
2019–2020	Gavilanes de Matamoros	8	(1)
2020	Lobos Zacatepec	0	(0)
2021–2022	Tecos	25	(9)
- * Club domestic league appearances and goals as of 16:30, 24 January 2020 (UTC)

Obed Ulises Estrada Mora (born July 31, 1994) is a Mexican professional footballer who plays for Gavilanes de Matamoros.
