= Estadio Municipal de San Cristóbal de las Casas =

Stadium in San Cristóbal de las Casas, Chiapas, Mexico

Coordinates: 16.72955°N 92.64361°W

The Estadio Municipal de San Cristóbal de las Casas is a multi-use stadium located in San Cristóbal de las Casas, Chiapas, Mexico. It is currently used mostly for football matches and is the home stadium for Ocelotes UNACH. The stadium has a capacity of 4,000 people.
