= UACH F.C. =

UACH FC
- Full name: Universidad Autónoma de Chihuahua Fútbol Club
- Founded: 2005; 21 years ago as Dorados Fuerza UACH
- Dissolved: June 2020; 6 years ago
- Ground: Estadio Olímpico José Reyes Baeza; Chihuahua, Chihuahua, Mexico
- Capacity: 22,000
Home colours	Away colours	Third colours

Universidad Autónoma de Chihuahua Fútbol Club was a Mexican football club based in the city of Chihuahua, Chihuahua. The club represented the Autonomous University of Chihuahua and participated in the Segunda División de México. The club played its home matches in the Estadio Olímpico José Reyes Baeza.

== History ==
This club was related to: Atlético Chihuahua and Dorados de Chihuahua, Second and Third division respectively, which were ephemeral existence.

This team was founded at the initiative of the State Government and the Autonomous University of Chihuahua in 2006, having its debut in the 2006 Apertura tournament. During its first two tournaments the desired results were not met and there was the possibility of team division relegation.

For the 2007–08 season, achieved the best campaign team, to be first on the table for unaffiliated and third overall in the Northern Zone in the Apertura 2007, which gave him the right to contest its first league, which was eliminated in the first round (eighth) for Atlético Cihuatlán, and for the Clausura 2008, the team managed to remain as first overall in the north, tied in points with Bravos de Nuevo Laredo, but with a better goal difference, thus the move to its second league, where the story was repeated, leaving out the first change, this time against the Vaqueros de Ixtlán; curious and final time in these eliminations, are the failure to weigh the local ground, as before Cihuatlán was lost in the round tied with Vaqueros in overtime. Then followed two short tournaments that started well, taking the taste of undefeated for most of the tournament and giving the front end of the Loros de Colima and Dorados de Los Mochis classification followed by two liguillas.

On November 12, 2010, was achieved the feat for the fourth time they took one of the biggest wins for the Apertura 2010 by just defeating Delfines de los Cabos 2–1, which got their ticket to the playoffs in the Liga de Ascenso of the Second Division Professional Soccer. They were set to face Cajeteros de Celaya in the second round of the league. Wednesday, November 24, the 1st leg in Chihuahua and Saturday, November 27, the 2nd leg in Celaya, Guanajuato. In the first round, Fuerza didn't know how to take the advantage at home and went with a score of 0–0. Sadly, they were defeated at Celaya, with a final score of 5–3. Club Celaya eventually became the Segunda División champion for this season.

From January 2019, the team was renamed as Club Universidad Autónoma de Chihuahua. In June 2020, the club was put on one–year hiatus due to financial issues derived from COVID-19, in 2021 the club did not return to sporting activity due to financial issues and economic problems, so it was dissolved. In 2022, the team's franchise was reactivated and transferred to Grupo Xoy Capital to make way for Chihuahua F.C., a team that took the place of UACH F.C. on the Liga Premier – Serie A.

== Stadium ==
The first stadium for the Dorados, was the mythical Estadio de la Ciudad Deportiva, which has a capacity of about 4,000 spectators, the stadium hosted the team at the 2006 Apertura and Clausura 2007.

For the Apertura 2007, Dorados moved into the UACH University Olympic Stadium, which has a capacity of 22.000 spectators and has synthetic grass and a giant screen, making it one of the best in the north of the country. Note that this stadium is in its early stages as the project is to expand the seating capacity to 35,000.

== Season to season ==
Season	Division	Place
Clausura 2013	2nd Division	13
Apertura 2013	2nd Division	11
Clausura 2014	2nd Division	24
Apertura 2014	2nd Division	
Clausura 2015	2nd Division	
Apertura 2015	2nd Division	
Clausura 2016	2nd Division	
Apertura 2016	2nd Division	
Clausura 2017	2nd Division	
Apertura 2017	2nd Division	
Clausura 2018	2nd Division	
2018-2019	2nd Division	

== Honours ==
=== Friendly ===
- Copa Piedras Negras(1): 2007

== Fans And Supporters ==
The team has a loyal base of fans, which is usually students, among them is the Barra, "La Impuntal" a group of faithful followers of the golden team, composed of about 50 members and have been supporting the team since its first home game and have emerged as major force encouraging Dorados UACH.

== Sponsorship ==
- Pepsi
- Grupo BAFAR
- Cerveza Sol
- Grupo Cementos de Chihuahua
- Sistema Radiolobo
