= Inter San Miguel =

Mexican football club

San Miguel Internacional
- Full name: San Miguel F.C. Internacional
- Nicknames: El Inter (The Inter), Los Arcángeles (The Archangels)
- Founded: 23 June 2017; 9 years ago
- Dissolved: 19 July 2018; 8 years ago
- Ground: Estadio José María "Capi" Correa; San Miguel de Allende, Guanajuato
- Capacity: 4,000
- League: Liga Premier - Serie B
- 2017–18: Dissolved
Home colours	Away colours

San Miguel F.C. Internacional, commonly known as Inter de San Miguel, was a Mexican football club based in San Miguel de Allende, Guanajuato that competed in the Liga Premier - Serie B, the third level division of Mexican football. The team was founded on June 23, 2017 and dissolved on July 19, 2018, after it was relocated to the city of San Luis Potosí and renamed as FC Potosino.

In 2022, a new football club was founded in the city after the relocation of Strikers F.C. International, a Tercera División de México club, from Comonfort, Guanajuato to San Miguel de Allende, in August 2022 the team was renamed as Club Atlético San Miguel, for which the history of soccer was resumed in the city.

== Players ==
=== Current squad ===
Note: Flags indicate national team as defined under FIFA eligibility rules; some limited exceptions apply. Players may hold more than one non-FIFA nationality.

No. / Pos. / Nation / Player	No. / Pos. / Nation / Player
