= 2011–12 Liga de Nuevos Talentos season =

Liga de Nuevos Talentos
- Season: 2011–12
- Dates: 12 August 2011 – 27 May 2012
- Champions: Apertura: Estudiantes Tecos; Clausura; Atlas
- Promoted: Atlas
- Stats are from the regular season only

The 2011–12 Liga de Nuevos Talentos season was split in two tournaments Apertura and Clausura. Liga de Nuevos Talentos was the fourth–tier football league of Mexico. The season was played between 12 August 2011 and 27 May 2012.

== Teams ==
=== Group 1 ===
Location of teams in the 2011–12 LNT Group 1

Club	City	Stadium	Capacity
Álamos	Ciudad Nezahualcóyotl, State of Mexico	Ciudad Deportiva Jardín	6,000
Alto Rendimiento Tuzo	San Agustín Tlaxiaca, Hidalgo	Universidad del Fútbol; Hidalgo	1,000; 27,512
América Coapa	Mexico City	Instalaciones Club América	1,000
Astros	Mexico City	Jesús Martínez "Palillo"	6,000
Atlético Tapatío	Chalco, State of Mexico	Arreola	2,500
Bavaria Tultitlán	Tultitlán, State of Mexico	Deportivo Cartagena; Cancha Nou Camp	1,000; 500
Cañoneros	Campeche, Campeche	Universitario de Campeche	4,000
Centro Universitario del Fútbol	San Agustín Tlaxiaca, Hidalgo	Universidad del Fútbol	1,000
Cuautla	Cuautla, Morelos	Isidro Gil Tapia	5,000
Lobos Prepa	Puebla, Puebla	Preparatoria Benito Juárez	1,000
Pumas Naucalpan	Mexico City	La Cantera	2,000
Reyes de Texcoco	Texcoco, State of Mexico	Municipal Claudio Suárez	4,000
Tecamachalco Sur	Huixquilucan de Degollado, State of Mexico	Alberto Pérez Navarro	3,000
Garzas UAEH	Pachuca, Hidalgo	Club Hidalguense	600
Zacatepec 1948	Zacatepec, Morelos	Agustín Coruco Díaz	16,000

=== Group 2 ===
Location of teams in the 2011–12 LNT Group 2

Club	City	Stadium	Capacity
Alacranes de Durango	Durango City, Durango	Francisco Zarco	18,000
Alfareros de Tonalá	Tonalá, Jalisco	Unidad Deportiva Revolución Mexicana	4,000
Atlas	Zapopan, Jalisco	Alfredo "Pistache" Torres	3,000
Cachorros León	León, Guanajuato	León	31,297
Cachorros UANL	General Zuazua, Nuevo León	Instalaciones de Zuazua	800
Colegio Once México	Zapopan, Jalisco	Colegio Once México	3,000
Estudiantes Tecos	Zapopan, Jalisco	Deportivo UAG	1,000
Indios	Ciudad Juárez, Chihuahua	Olímpico Benito Juárez	19,703
Irapuato	Irapuato, Guanajuato	Sergio León Chávez	25,000
La Piedad	Guanajuato City, Guanajuato	Macrocentro 2	1,000
Necaxa	Aguascalientes, Aguascalientes	Casa Club Necaxa	1,000
Orinegros de Ciudad Madero	Ciudad Madero, Tamaulipas	Tamaulipas	19,667
Oro	Guadalajara, Jalisco	Jalisco; Club La Primavera	55,020; 3,000
Topos de Reynosa	Reynosa, Tamaulipas	Unidad Deportiva Solidaridad	20,000
Tuzos UAZ	Zacatecas City, Zacatecas	Universitario Unidad Deportiva Norte	5,000

==== Changes during the season ====
- Orinegros de Ciudad Madero only played the first 8 games, then retired.
- On December 22, 2011, the FMF disaffiliated the Club Indios de Ciudad Juárez, with this, its affiliate team, a participant in this division, was also disqualified and did not play the Clausura 2012 tournament.

== Torneo Apertura ==
=== Regular season ===
==== Group 1 ====
===== Standings =====
Pos	Team	Pld	W	D	L	GF	GA	GD	Pts	Qualification or relegation
1	Garzas UAEH	14	10	2	2	31	13	+18	34	Promotion play-offs
2	América Coapa	14	9	4	1	48	16	+32	33	Promotion play-offs
3	Alto Rendimiento Tuzo	14	9	3	2	23	12	+11	32	Promotion play-offs
4	Lobos Prepa	14	8	3	3	29	10	+19	27	Promotion play-offs
5	Zacatepec 1948	14	8	3	3	25	14	+11	27	Promotion play-offs
6	Cuautla	14	8	1	5	31	18	+13	25	Promotion play-offs
7	Tecamachalco Sur	14	5	6	3	28	24	+4	23	Promotion play-offs
8	Álamos	14	5	5	4	23	21	+2	21	Promotion play-offs
9	Pumas Naucalpan	14	5	3	6	25	16	+9	18	
10	Reyes de Texcoco	14	4	3	7	14	35	−21	17	
11	Bavaria Tultitlán	14	4	1	9	18	36	−18	14	
12	Atlético Tapatío	14	3	1	10	13	31	−18	11	
13	Cañoneros de Campeche	14	3	1	10	18	40	−22	11	
14	Centro Universitario del Fútbol	14	3	0	11	12	27	−15	9	
15	Astros	14	2	2	10	17	42	−25	8	

Source: Segunda División FMF

===== Results =====
Home \ Away	ALA	ART	AME	AST	ATP	BAV	CAM	CUF	CUA	LOB	PUM	REY	TEC	UEH	ZAC
Álamos	—	1–2	—	1–1	—	—	4–2	—	0–3	2–1	1–1	—	—	—	0–1
Alto Rendimiento Tuzo	—	—	—	3–2	2–0	—	—	—	1–0	—	2–1	0–1	4–1	0–2	0–0
América Coapa	5–3	3–3	—	—	3–0	—	—	—	—	0–0	—	10–0	5–1	1–2	—
Astros	—	—	0–6	—	3–0	0–3	—	2–1	2–4	—	—	—	—	—	1–2
Atlético Tapatío	0–3	—	—	—	—	—	3–1	—	—	4–3	1–1	3–0	—	0–2	—
Bavaria Tultitlán	0–2	0–1	2–4	—	2–0	—	—	3–2	—	—	—	1–3	1–3	1–4	—
Cañoneros de Campeche	—	0–2	—	6–1	—	1–3	—	1–0	1–7	—	1–0	—	—	—	1–2
C.U. Fútbol	0–1	0–2	1–4	—	1–0	—	—	—	—	—	—	1–2	2–0	1–3	—
Cuautla	—	—	0–3	—	3–0	5–0	—	4–1	—	—	—	—	1–1	2–1	0–1
Lobos Prepa	—	1–1	—	2–0	—	1–0	4–0	2–0	1–0	—	4–0	—	—	—	4–0
Pumas Naucalpan	—	—	0–0	5–1	—	6–0	—	2–0	5–0	—	—	—	1–2	—	0–2
Reyes Texcoco	1–1	—	—	2–2	—	—	2–1	—	1–2	1–5	0–2	—	—	—	—
Tecamachalco Sur	2–2	—	—	4–1	3–1	—	6–2	—	—	1–1	—	0–0	—	3–1	—
Garzas UAEH	2–2	—	—	3–1	—	—	5–0	—	—	1–0	2–1	2–0	—	—	—
Zacatepec 1948	—	—	2–3	—	4–1	4–0	—	1–2	—	—	—	5–1	0–0	1–1	—

Source: Segunda División FMF
Legend: Blue = home team win; Yellow = draw; Red = away team win.

==== Group 2 ====
===== Standings =====
Pos	Team	Pld	W	D	L	GF	GA	GD	Pts	Qualification or relegation
1	Estudiantes Tecos	13	10	2	1	42	14	+28	34	Promotion play-offs
2	Atlas	14	9	2	3	31	11	+20	31	Promotion play-offs
3	Oro	14	8	4	2	24	15	+9	30	Promotion play-offs
4	Necaxa	14	7	6	1	30	15	+15	28	Promotion play-offs
5	Cachorros UANL	14	6	3	5	22	17	+5	23	Promotion play-offs
6	Alacranes de Durango	13	7	1	5	21	15	+6	22	Promotion play-offs
7	Cachorros León	13	5	4	4	31	26	+5	22	Promotion play-offs
8	Tuzos UAZ	14	6	2	6	32	25	+7	21	
9	Indios	13	5	2	6	28	22	+6	18	
10	Irapuato	13	5	2	6	25	17	+8	17	Promotion play-offs
11	Topos de Reynosa	13	5	2	6	23	27	−4	17	
12	La Piedad	14	5	1	8	25	31	−6	17	
13	Colegio Once México	14	3	2	9	11	29	−18	12	
14	Orinegros de Ciudad Madero	8	0	2	6	3	27	−24	2	
15	Alfareros de Tonalá	14	0	1	13	2	59	−57	1	

Source: Segunda División FMF

===== Results =====
Home \ Away	ALD	ALF	ATL	CAL	CAU	COM	EST	IND	IRA	LPD	NEC	ORI	ORO	TOP	UAZ
Alacranes	—	2–0	2–0	—	—	4–0	0–1	4–3	—	—	0–2	—	—	2–0	4–3
Alfareros	—	—	—	0–5	0–2	—	—	—	1–4	1–5	—	0–0	0–1	—	—
Atlas	—	3–0	—	—	3–0	—	3–1	—	2–1	3–1	—	10–0	0–1	—	—
Cachorros León	0–1	—	2–1	—	—	4–0	2–3	3–2	—	—	4–4	—	—	1–1	2–2
Cachorros UANL	1–1	—	—	2–2	—	—	—	—	3–0	1–0	—	4–0	0–1	—	—
Colegio Once México	—	4–3	0–1	—	2–1	—	0–3	—	0–2	2–1	—	0–0	—	—	—
Estudiantes Tecos	—	9–0	—	—	3–0	—	—	4–4	4–2	2–0	1–0	—	—	5–1	2–2
Indios	—	7–0	0–1	—	1–3	3–0	—	—	—	1–2	—	—	—	2–1	—
Irapuato	2–0	—	—	1–2	—	—	—	0–1	—	—	0–0	—	2–2	—	5–0
La Piedad	2–1	—	—	4–2	—	—	—	—	1–6	—	1–3	5–1	2–2	—	—
Necaxa	—	2–0	1–1	—	2–2	2–1	—	1–1	—	—	—	—	—	7–2	2–1
Orinegros	—	—	—	—	—	—	—	—	—	—	0–3	—	0–2	—	2–3
Oro	1–0	—	—	5–2	—	1–1	0–1	2–3	—	—	1–1	—	—	3–2	2–1
Topos Reynosa	—	6–0	1–1	—	2–1	1–0	—	—	1–0	4–1	—	—	—	—	—
Tuzos UAZ	—	9–0	1–2	—	0–2	3–1	—	1–0	—	2–0	—	—	—	4–1	—

Source: Segunda División FMF
Legend: Blue = home team win; Yellow = draw; Red = away team win.

=== Liguilla ===
The eight best teams of each group play two games against each other on a home-and-away basis. The higher seeded teams play on their home field during the second leg. The winner of each match up is determined by aggregate score. In the round of 16, quarterfinals and semifinals, if the two teams are tied on aggregate the higher seeded team advances. In the final, if the two teams are tied after both legs, the match goes to extra time and, if necessary, a penalty shoot-out.

Round of 16
1	Estudiantes Tecos	1	2	3
11	Tecamachalco Sur	1	0	1
4	Alto Rendimiento Tuzo	2	0	2
12	Cachorros UANL	3	2	5
5	Atlas	2	1	3
13	Alacranes	2	0	2
8	Necaxa	1	4	5
14	Cachorros León	0	1	1
2	Garzas UAEH	0	1	1
16	Irapuato	0	0	0
9	Zacatepec 1948	0	1	1
8	Lobos Prepa	0	0	0
3	América Coapa	1	4	5
15	Álamos	1	1	2
6	Oro (s.)	0	5	5
10	Cuautla	4	1	5

Quarter-finals
1	Estudiantes Tecos	1	2	3
12	Cachorros UANL	0	1	1
5	Atlas (s.)	0	1	1
8	Necaxa	1	0	1
2	Garzas UAEH	1	2	3
9	Zacatepec 1948	0	1	1
3	América Coapa	1	4	5
6	Oro	2	0	2

Semi-finals
1	Estudiantes Tecos (s.)	1	0	1
5	Atlas	0	1	1
2	Garzas UAEH	2	1	3
3	América Coapa	2	2	4

Final
1	Estudiantes Tecos	2	2	4
3	América Coapa	0	1	1

==== Round of 16 ====
Team 1	Agg.	Team 2	1st leg	2nd leg
Estudiantes Tecos	3–1	Tecamachalco Sur	1–1	2–0
Alto Rendimiento Tuzo	2–5	Cachorros UANL	2–3	0–2
Atlas	3–2	Alacranes de Durango	2–2	1–0
Necaxa	5–1	Cachorros León	1–0	4–1
Garzas UAEH	1–0	Irapuato	0–0	1–0
Zacatepec 1948	1–0	Lobos Prepa	0–0	1–0
América Coapa	5–2	Álamos	1–1	4–1
Oro (s.)	5–5	Cuautla	0–4	5–1

===== First leg =====
23 November 2011	Cachorros UANL	3–2	Alto Rendimiento Tuzo	General Zuazua
10:00	Martínez 26', 32'; Sias 83'	Report	Yong 30'; Becerra 90'	Stadium: Instalaciones de Zuazua; Attendance: 100; Referee: Dennis Celerino Zaleta Cortéz

23 November 2011	Cachorros León	0–1	Necaxa	León
11:00		Report	Ruvalcaba 44'	Stadium: Estadio León; Attendance: 100; Referee: Edgardo Espejo Tello

23 November 2011	Lobos Prepa	0–0	Zacatepec 1948	Puebla City
13:00		Report		Stadium: Preparatoria Benito Juárez; Attendance: 200; Referee: Ilya Izaskun Flores Florian

23 November 2011	Tecamachalco Sur	1–1	Estudiantes Tecos	Huixquilucan de Degollado
15:00	Padilla 21'	Report	Gracia 29'	Stadium: Estadio Alberto Pérez Navarro; Attendance: 50; Referee: Sergio León Hernández

23 November 2011	Alacranes de Durango	2–2	Atlas	Durango City
15:00	Nava 12'; Macías 90+2'	Report	Sánchez 45'; Gómez 80'	Stadium: Estadio Francisco Zarco; Attendance: 400; Referee: Saúl Fernando Orozco Nájera

24 November 2011	Álamos	1–1	América Coapa	Ciudad Nezahualcóyotl
15:00	Ochoa 19'	Report	Camarena 1'	Stadium: Ciudad Deportiva Jardín; Attendance: 300; Referee: Erick Arce Castillo

24 November 2011	Irapuato	0–0	Garzas UAEH	Irapuato
15:30		Report		Stadium: Estadio Sergio León Chávez; Attendance: 200; Referee: Adonai Escobedo González

24 November 2011	Cuautla	4–0	Oro	Cuautla
15:30	Rodríguez 14'; Reyes 17', 67', 70'	Report		Stadium: Estadio Isidro Gil Tapia; Attendance: 500; Referee: Francisco Hernández Gómez

===== Second leg =====
26 November 2011	Estudiantes Tecos	2–0 (3–1 agg.)	Tecamachalco Sur	Zapopan
11:00	Hernández 18'; Damm 89'	Report		Stadium: Deportivo UAG; Attendance: 150; Referee: Marco Antonio Ortiz Nava

26 November 2011	Alto Rendimiento Tuzo	0–2 (2–5 agg.)	Cachorros UANL	Pachuca
12:00		Report	Robledo 81'; Castillo 88'	Stadium: Estadio Hidalgo; Attendance: 500; Referee: Alejandro Barrios Ramírez

26 November 2011	Necaxa	4–1 (5–1 agg.)	Cachorros León	Aguascalientes City
12:00	Córdova 2'; González 58'; Jiménez 80'; Acosta 90+3'	Report	Castañeda 34'	Stadium: Estadio Victoria; Attendance: 300; Referee: Jesús Leopoldo Guerrero García

26 November 2011	Atlas	1–0 (3–2 agg.)	Alacranes de Durango	Zapopan
15:00	Espinosa 67'	Report		Stadium: Estadio Alfredo "Pistache" Torres; Attendance: 100; Referee: Geovanni Ochoa Corral

26 November 2011	Zacatepec 1948	1–0 (1–0 agg.)	Lobos Prepa	Zacatepec
15:00	Reyes 82'	Report		Stadium: Agustín Coruco Díaz; Attendance: 800; Referee: Óscar Mejía García

27 November 2011	Oro	5–1 (5–5 agg.)	Cuautla	Zapopan
10:00	Pardo 15', 18'; Mendoza 38', 82', 87'	Report	Ambrocio 16'	Stadium: Club Deportivo La Primavera; Attendance: 100; Referee: José Luis Muñoz Pantoja

27 November 2011	América Coapa	4–1 (5–2 agg.)	Álamos	Mexico City
11:00	Mora 37'; Quintana 44', 58'; Livera 77'	Report	Ochoa 39'	Stadium: Instalaciones Club América; Attendance: 200; Referee: Omar Jaime Hernández

27 November 2011	Garzas UAEH	1–0 (1–0 agg.)	Irapuato	Pachuca
13:00	Bustos 90+2'	Report		Stadium: Estadio Revolución Mexicana; Attendance: 400; Referee: Michel Caballero Galicia

==== Quarter-finals ====
Team 1	Agg.	Team 2	1st leg	2nd leg
Estudiantes Tecos	3–1	Cachorros UANL	1–0	2–1
Atlas (s.)	1–1	Necaxa	0–1	1–0
Garzas UAEH	3–1	Zacatepec 1948	1–0	2–1
América Coapa	5–2	Oro	1–2	4–0

===== First leg =====
30 November 2011	Cachorros UANL	0–1	Estudiantes Tecos	General Zuazua
10:00		Report	Torres 87'	Stadium: Instalaciones de Zuazua; Attendance: 100; Referee: Saúl Fernando Orozco Nájera

30 November 2011	Necaxa	1–0	Atlas	Aguascalientes City
12:00	Cedillo 80'	Report		Stadium: Estadio Victoria; Attendance: 300; Referee: Omar Jaime Hernández

30 November 2011	Zacatepec 1948	0–1	Garzas UAEH	Zacatepec
15:30		Report	Bustos 16'	Stadium: Agustín Coruco Díaz; Attendance: 500; Referee: Esteban Manuel Olvera Hernández

1 December 2011	Oro	2–1	América Coapa	Zapopan
10:00	Ramírez 21'; Mendoza 62'	Report	Cruz 51'	Stadium: Club Deportivo La Primavera; Attendance: 50; Referee: Luis Miguel Tapia González

===== Second leg =====
3 December 2011	Estudiantes Tecos	2–1 (3–1 agg.)	Cachorros UANL	Zapopan
11:00	Torres 49'; Palomares 85'	Report	Morales 73' (own)	Stadium: Deportivo UAG; Attendance: 100; Referee: Adonai Escobedo González

3 December 2011	Garzas UAEH	2–1 (3–1 agg.)	Zacatepec 1948	Pachuca
11:00	Bustos 15', 68'	Report	Menes 19'	Stadium: Estadio Revolución Mexicana; Attendance: 800; Referee: Fernando Hernández Gómez

3 December 2011	Atlas	1–0 (1–1 agg.)	Necaxa	Zapopan
16:00	Rodríguez 90+2'	Report		Stadium: Estadio Alfredo "Pistache" Torres; Attendance: 200; Referee: José Luis Muñoz Pantoja

4 December 2011	América Coapa	4–0 (5–2 agg.)	Oro	Mexico City
11:00	Camarena 6'; Cruz 12'; Mora 59'; Cervantes 86' (own)	Report		Stadium: Instalaciones Club América; Attendance: Erick Arce Castillo; Referee: 100

==== Semi-finals ====
Team 1	Agg.	Team 2	1st leg	2nd leg
Estudiantes Tecos (s.)	1–1	Atlas	1–0	0–1
Garzas UAEH	3–4	América Coapa	2–2	1–2

===== First leg =====
7 December 2011	América Coapa	2–2	Garzas UAEH	Mexico City
11:00	Mora 29'; Mondragón 56'	Report	Quiróz 40'; Hernández 42'	Stadium: Instalaciones Club América; Attendance: 100; Referee: Rodrigo Cervantes Muñoz

7 December 2011	Atlas	0–1	Estudiantes Tecos	Zapopan
12:00		Report	Valenzuela 78'	Stadium: Estadio Alfredo "Pistache" Torres; Attendance: 300; Referee: Julio César Mondragón Robles

===== Second leg =====
10 December 2011	Estudiantes Tecos	0–1 (1–1 agg.)	Atlas	Zapopan
11:00		Report	Espinosa 2'	Stadium: Estadio Tres de Marzo; Attendance: 600; Referee: Emerson Gustavo Zamora Ramírez

10 December 2011	Garzas UAEH	1–2 (3–4 agg.)	América Coapa	Pachuca
11:00	Bustos 23'	Report	González 1'; Quintana 73'	Stadium: Club Hidalguense; Attendance: 300; Referee: Erick Arce Castillo

==== Final ====
Team 1	Agg.	Team 2	1st leg	2nd leg
Estudiantes Tecos	4–1	América Coapa	2–0	2–1

===== First leg =====
14 December 2011	América Coapa	0–2	Estudiantes Tecos	Mexico City
11:00		Report	Gracia 20', 51'	Stadium: Instalaciones Club América; Attendance: 150; Referee: Erick Arce Castillo

===== Second leg =====
17 December 2011	Estudiantes Tecos	2–1 (4–1 agg.)	América Coapa	Zapopan
18:00	Gracia 55', 83'	Report	González 48'	Stadium: Estadio Tres de Marzo; Attendance: 2,000; Referee: Jesús Bisguerra Mendiola

Apertura 2011 winners

1st title

== Torneo Clausura ==
=== Regular season ===
==== Group 1 ====
===== Standings =====
Pos	Team	Pld	W	D	L	GF	GA	GD	Pts	Qualification or relegation
1	América Coapa	14	12	1	1	35	11	+24	38	Promotion play-offs
2	Cañoneros de Campeche	14	8	4	2	25	12	+13	29	Promotion play-offs
3	Pumas Naucalpan	14	8	4	2	24	15	+9	29	Promotion play-offs
4	Alto Rendimiento Tuzo	14	7	4	3	33	21	+12	28	Promotion play-offs
5	Zacatepec 1948	14	6	6	2	33	22	+11	27	Promotion play-offs
6	Reyes de Texcoco	14	6	5	3	27	20	+7	26	Promotion play-offs
7	Garzas UAEH	13	6	4	3	24	12	+12	23	Promotion play-offs
8	Lobos Prepa	14	7	1	6	28	16	+12	22	Promotion play-offs
9	Cuautla	14	5	4	5	31	28	+3	20	
10	Atlético Tapatío	14	4	4	6	23	24	−1	19	
11	Tecamachalco Sur	14	5	3	6	13	17	−4	19	
12	Centro Universitario del Fútbol	14	1	4	9	7	29	−22	9	
13	Álamos	13	2	2	9	3	32	−29	9	
14	Bavaria Tultitlán	14	2	1	11	13	34	−21	8	
15	Astros	14	1	1	12	16	42	−26	4	

Source: Segunda División FMF

===== Results =====
Home \ Away	ALA	ART	AME	AST	ATP	BAV	CAM	CUF	CUA	LOB	PUM	REY	TEC	UEH	ZAC
Álamos	—	—	0–2	—	0–4	1–0	—	0–0	—	—	—	0–0	0–2	—	—
Alto Rendimiento Tuzo	7–0	—	3–0	—	—	5–0	2–2	2–1	—	2–1	—	—	—	—	—
América Coapa	—	—	—	1–0	—	2–1	2–1	4–0	3–0	—	2–1	—	—	—	5–2
Astros	4–0	0–2	—	—	—	—	3–4	—	—	1–5	1–1	1–5	0–2	0–4	—
Atlético Tapatío	—	3–3	2–4	5–1	—	3–2	—	2–2	1–0	—	—	—	0–1	—	1–1
Bavaria Tultitlán	—	—	—	2–1	—	—	0–1	—	1–3	0–2	1–3	—	—	—	0–4
Cañoneros de Campeche	4–0	—	—	—	2–0	—	—	—	—	2–0	—	4–1	1–0	2–0	—
C.U. Fútbol	—	—	—	1–0	—	2–2	0–0	—	0–3	0–3	0–2	—	—	—	0–5
Cuautla	6–1	4–0	—	4–2	—	—	1–1	—	—	3–3	1–2	1–3	—	—	—
Lobos Prepa	0–1	—	0–2	—	5–1	—	—	—	—	—	—	2–0	0–1	3–0	—
Pumas Naucalpan	2–0	1–1	—	—	1–0	—	2–0	—	—	1–4	—	1–1	—	2–1	—
Reyes Texcoco	—	3–1	0–2	—	2–1	4–1	—	3–1	—	—	—	—	2–2	0–0	3–3
Tecamachalco Sur	—	1–2	0–5	—	—	1–2	—	1–0	1–1	—	1–3	—	—	—	0–0
Garzas UAEH	—	2–2	1–1	—	0–0	2–1	—	2–0	7–1	—	—	—	1–0	—	4–0
Zacatepec 1948	1–0	3–1	—	6–2	—	—	1–1	—	3–3	2–0	2–2	—	—	—	—

Source: Segunda División FMF
Legend: Blue = home team win; Yellow = draw; Red = away team win.

==== Group 2 ====
===== Standings =====
Pos	Team	Pld	W	D	L	GF	GA	GD	Pts	Qualification or relegation
1	Atlas	12	7	4	1	22	9	+13	26	Promotion play-offs
2	Tuzos UAZ	12	8	1	3	23	13	+10	26	Promotion play-offs
3	Cachorros León	12	7	3	2	24	15	+9	24	Promotion play-offs
4	Estudiantes Tecos	12	5	4	3	20	13	+7	22	Promotion play-offs
5	La Piedad	12	7	1	4	23	18	+5	22	Promotion play-offs
6	Alacranes de Durango	11	5	3	3	16	12	+4	20	Promotion play-offs
7	Cachorros UANL	12	5	3	4	16	10	+6	19	Promotion play-offs
8	Necaxa	12	4	4	4	15	11	+4	19	Promotion play-offs
9	Irapuato	12	3	4	5	16	15	+1	17	
10	Alfareros de Tonalá	11	3	2	6	12	20	−8	12	
11	Colegio Once México	12	3	0	9	10	31	−21	9	
12	Topos de Reynosa	12	2	2	8	12	30	−18	8	
13	Oro	12	2	1	9	12	24	−12	7	

Source: Segunda División FMF

===== Results =====
Home \ Away	ALD	ALF	ATL	CAL	CAU	COM	EST	IRA	LPD	NEC	ORO	TOP	UAZ
Alacranes	—	—	—	3–0	0–0	—	—	2–0	1–1	—	3–1	—	—
Alfareros	—	—	0–2	—	—	2–3	0–0	—	—	2–0	3–0	0–2	0–3
Atlas	0–0	—	—	1–1	—	2–1	—	—	—	2–1	—	5–1	5–1
Cachorros León	—	4–2	—	—	1–2	—	—	2–0	3–1	—	3–1	—	—
Cachorros UANL	—	1–1	3–0	—	—	1–0	4–0	—	—	0–1	—	2–0	0–1
Colegio Once México	0–2	—	—	2–5	—	—	—	—	—	0–2	0–1	1–0	0–4
Estudiantes Tecos	3–2	—	1–1	0–0	—	9–0	—	—	—	—	2–1	—	—
Irapuato	—	0–1	0–0	—	1–1	3–2	1–1	—	0–2	—	—	8–1	—
La Piedad	—	5–1	0–2	—	2–1	0–1	1–0	—	—	—	—	5–1	3–1
Necaxa	3–0	—	—	1–1	—	—	0–2	0–0	5–0	—	1–1	—	—
Oro	—	—	0–2	—	3–1	—	—	1–2	2–3	—	—	—	—
Topos Reynosa	1–3	—	—	1–2	—	—	1–2	—	—	1–1	2–0	—	1–1
Tuzos UAZ	3–0	—	—	1–2	—	—	2–0	2–1	—	2–0	2–1	—	—

Source: Segunda División FMF
Legend: Blue = home team win; Yellow = draw; Red = away team win.

=== Liguilla ===
The eight best teams of each group play two games against each other on a home-and-away basis. The higher seeded teams play on their home field during the second leg. The winner of each match up is determined by aggregate score. In the round of 16, quarterfinals and semifinals, if the two teams are tied on aggregate the higher seeded team advances. In the final, if the two teams are tied after both legs, the match goes to extra time and, if necessary, a penalty shoot-out.

Round of 16
6	Atlas (s.)	2	1	3
17	Necaxa	2	1	3
8	Reyes de Texcoco	2	1	3
10	Garzas UAEH	3	1	4
1	América Coapa (s.)	1	1	2
15	Cachorros UANL	2	0	2
7	Tuzos UAZ	0	0	0
13	La Piedad	0	1	1
3	Pumas Naucalpan	6	1	7
11	Lobos Prepa	0	1	1
14	Alacranes (s.)	0	3	3
2	Cañoneros	2	1	3
5	Zacatepec 1948 (s.)	0	2	2
12	Estudiantes Tecos	2	0	2
9	Cachorros León	4	2	6
4	Alto Rendimiento Tuzo	0	2	2

Quarter-finals
6	Atlas (s.)	1	1	2
10	Garzas UAEH	1	1	2
1	América Coapa	1	0	1
13	La Piedad	2	2	4
3	Pumas Naucalpan	1	2	3
14	Alacranes	2	0	2
5	Zacatepec 1948	1	0	1
9	Cachorros León	2	2	4

Semi-finals
6	Atlas	2	1	3
13	La Piedad	1	1	2
3	Pumas Naucalpan (s.)	0	2	2
9	Cachorros León	1	1	1

Final
6	Atlas	2	4	6
3	Pumas Naucalpan	2	1	3

==== Round of 16 ====
Team 1	Agg.	Team 2	1st leg	2nd leg
Atlas (s.)	3–3	Necaxa	2–2	1–1
Reyes de Texcoco	3–4	Garzas UAEH	2–3	1–1
América Coapa (s.)	2–2	Cachorros UANL	1–2	1–0
Tuzos UAZ	0–1	La Piedad	0–0	0–1
Pumas Naucalpan	7–1	Lobos Prepa	6–0	1–1
Alacranes de Durango (s.)	3–3	Cañoneros de Campeche	0–2	3–1
Zacatepec 1948 (s.)	2–2	Estudiantes Tecos	0–2	2–0
Cachorros León	6–2	Alto Rendimiento Tuzo	4–0	2–2

===== First leg =====
25 April 2012	Necaxa	2–2	Atlas	Aguascalientes City
10:00	García 43'; Ríos 76'	Report	Gómez 61'; Díaz 70'	Stadium: Estadio Victoria; Attendance: 100; Referee: Edgardo Espejo Tello

25 April 2012	Lobos Prepa	0–6	Pumas Naucalpan	Puebla City
10:00		Report	Rodríguez 16'; Popoca 31', 50', 69'; Gutiérrez 35', 43'	Stadium: Ciudad Universitaria Puebla; Attendance: 50; Referee: Adalid Maganda Villalva

25 April 2012	La Piedad	0–0	Tuzos UAZ	Guanajuato City
16:00		Report		Stadium: Deportivo Macrocentro 2 Attendance: 50; Referee: Omar Jaime Hernández

26 April 2012	Cachorros UANL	2–1	América Coapa	General Zuazua
10:00	Diego 32'; Reyes 90+1'	Report	González 63'	Stadium: Instalaciones de Zuazua; Attendance: 50; Referee: Dennis Celerino Zaleta Cortéz

26 April 2012	Estudiantes Tecos	2–0	Zacatepec 1948	Zapopan
11:00	Valenzuela 66'; Morán 78'	Report		Stadium: Estadio Tres de Marzo; Attendance: 100; Referee: Antonio de Jesús Olalde Vázquez

26 April 2012	Garzas UAEH	3–2	Reyes de Texcoco	Pachuca
12:00	Bustos 7', 26', 52'	Report	Ochoa 21', 60'	Stadium: Club Hidalguense; Attendance: 200; Referee: Mario Andrés Eliosa Torres

26 April 2012	Alto Rendimiento Tuzo	0–4	Cachorros León	Pachuca
12:00		Report	Rocha 60', 71'; Torres 67', 85'	Stadium: Estadio Hidalgo; Attendance: 100; Referee: Daniel Neftalí Bahena Sámano

26 April 2012	Cañoneros de Campeche	2–0	Alacranes de Durango	Campeche City
16:00	Gordillo 6', 43'	Report		Stadium: Estadio Universitario de Campeche; Attendance: 400; Referee: Carlos Javier Ríos García

===== Second leg =====
28 April 2012	Pumas Naucalpan	1–1 (7–1 agg.)	Lobos Prepa	Mexico City
12:00	Martínez 68'	Report	Gómez 55'	Stadium: Instalaciones de La Cantera; Attendance: 100; Referee: Carlos Javier Ríos García

28 April 2012	Atlas	1–1 (3–3 agg.)	Necaxa	Zapopan
16:00	Mejía 49'	Report	Ornelas 79'	Stadium: Estadio Alfredo "Pistache" Torres; Attendance: 100; Referee: Luis Miguel Tapia González

28 April 2012	Tuzos UAZ	0–1 (0–1 agg.)	La Piedad	Zacatecas City
20:30		Report	Medina 59'	Stadium: Estadio Universitario Unidad Deportiva Norte; Attendance: 1,500; Referee: Jesús Leopoldo Guerrero García

29 April 2012	América Coapa	1–0 (2–2 agg.)	Cachorros UANL	Mexico City
12:00	González 8'	Report		Stadium: Instalaciones Club América; Attendance: 100; Referee: Erick Arce Castillo

29 April 2012	Alacranes de Durango	3–1 (3–3 agg.)	Cañoneros de Campeche	Durango City
12:00	Acosta 50'; Sánchez 56'; Delfín 78'	Report	Silvestre 71'	Stadium: Estadio Francisco Zarco; Attendance: 500; Referee: Saúl Fernando Orozco Nájera

29 April 2012	Reyes de Texcoco	1–1 (3–4 agg.)	Garzas UAEH	Texcoco
16:00	Buendía 82'	Report	Bustos 30'	Stadium: Estadio Municipal Claudio Suárez; Attendance: 300; Referee: Dennis Celerino Zaleta Cortéz

29 April 2012	Cachorros León	2–2 (6–2 agg.)	Alto Rendimiento Tuzo	León
16:00	Suastegui 64' (own); Castañeda 73'	Report	Becerril 44'; Ayala 86'	Stadium: Estadio León; Attendance: 200; Referee: Aldo Cano Martínez

29 April 2012	Zacatepec 1948	2–0 (2–2 agg.)	Estudiantes Tecos	Zacatepec
16:00	Reyes 16'; Ojeda 32'	Report		Stadium: Estadio Agustín "Coruco" Díaz; Attendance: 2,900; Referee: Henry Ulises The Avila

==== Quarter-finals ====
Team 1	Agg.	Team 2	1st leg	2nd leg
Atlas (s.)	2–2	Garzas UAEH	1–1	1–1
América Coapa	1–4	La Piedad	1–2	0–2
Pumas Naucalpan	3–2	Alacranes de Durango	1–2	2–0
Zacatepec 1948	1–4	Cachorros León	1–2	0–2

===== First leg =====
2 May 2012	Cachorros León	2–1	Zacatepec 1948	León
11:00	Torres 12', 51'	Report	Galván 11'	Stadium: Estadio León; Attendance: 100; Referee: Julio César Mondragón Robles

2 May 2012	Garzas UAEH	1–1	Atlas	Pachuca
12:00	Bustos 10'	Report	Mejía 15'	Stadium: Club Hidalguense; Attendance: 100; Referee: Daniel Neftalí Bahena Samano

2 May 2012	Alacranes de Durango	2–1	Pumas Naucalpan	Durango City
16:00	Camacho 13'; Rodríguez 90+4'	Report	Martínez 34'	Stadium: Estadio Francisco Zarco; Attendance: 2,000; Referee: Adrián Jiménez Enríquez

3 May 2012	La Piedad	2–1	América Coapa	Guanajuato City
16:00	Medina 4'; Dávalos 89'	Report	Mora 86'	Stadium: Deportivo Macrocentro 2 Attendance: 150; Referee: José Juan Contreras García

===== Second leg =====
5 May 2012	Pumas Naucalpan	2–0 (3–2 agg.)	Alacranes de Durango	Mexico City
12:00	Martínez 32'; Montiel 36'	Report		Stadium: Instalaciones de La Cantera; Attendance: 200; Referee: Ilya Izaskun Flores Florian

5 May 2012	Atlas	1–1 (2–2 agg.)	Garzas UAEH	Zapopan
16:00	Santoyo 62'	Report	Bustos 64'	Stadium: Estadio Alfredo "Pistache" Torres; Attendance: 100; Referee: Adonai Escobedo González

5 May 2012	Zacatepec 1948	0–2 (1–4 agg.)	Cachorros León	Zacatepec
16:00		Report	Maldonado 33'; Salmerón 44'	Stadium: Estadio Agustín "Coruco" Díaz; Attendance: 6,000; Referee: Adalid Maganda Villalba

6 May 2012	América Coapa	0–2 (1–4 agg.)	La Piedad	Mexico City
10:00		Report	Flores 68'; Negrete 70'	Stadium: Instalaciones Club América; Attendance: 100; Referee: Humberto Sánchez Reyna

==== Semi-finals ====
Team 1	Agg.	Team 2	1st leg	2nd leg
Atlas	3–2	La Piedad	2–1	1–1
Pumas Naucalpan (s.)	2–2	Cachorros León	0–1	2–1

===== First leg =====
9 May 2012	Cachorros León	1–0	Pumas Naucalpan	León
11:00	Rocha 68'	Report		Stadium: Estadio León; Attendance: 500; Referee: Diego Montaño Robles

9 May 2012	La Piedad	1–2	Atlas	Guanajuato City
17:00	Ruíz 63'	Report	Gómez 55'; Espinosa 88'	Stadium: Deportivo Macrocentro 2 Attendance: 300; Referee: Jonathan Hernández Juárez

===== Second leg =====
12 May 2012	Pumas Naucalpan	2–1 (2–2 agg.)	Cachorros León	Mexico City
12:00	Montiel 36'; M. Gutiérrez 89'	Report	C. Gutiérrez 42'	Stadium: Instalaciones de La Cantera; Attendance: 200; Referee: Adonai Escobedo González

12 May 2012	Atlas	1–1 (3–2 agg.)	La Piedad	Zapopan
16:00	Díaz 17'	Report	Silva 90+1'	Stadium: Estadio Alfredo "Pistache" Torres; Attendance: 250; Referee: Fernando Hernández Gómez

==== Final ====
Team 1	Agg.	Team 2	1st leg	2nd leg
Atlas	6–3	Pumas Naucalpan	2–2	4–1

===== First leg =====
16 May 2012	Pumas Naucalpan	2–2	Atlas	Mexico City
12:00	Ramírez 3' (own); Rodríguez 28'	Report	Obledo 68'; Mejía 83'	Stadium: Instalaciones de La Cantera; Attendance: 200; Referee: Dennis Celerino Zaleta Cortéz

===== Second leg =====
19 May 2012	Atlas	4–1 (6–3 agg.)	Pumas Naucalpan	Guadalajara
15:00	Díaz 10', 81'; Mejía 76'; Beltrán 85'	Report	Rodríguez 47'	Stadium: Estadio Jalisco; Attendance: 2,000; Referee: Marco Antonio Ortíz Nava

Clausura 2012 winners

1st title

== Relegation Table ==
P	Team	Pts	G	Pts/G	Notes
1	América Coapa	71	28	2.629	
2	Estudiantes Tecos	56	25	2.240	
3	Atlas	57	26	2.192	
4	Alto Rendimiento Tuzo	61	28	2.179	
5	Garzas UAEH	57	27	2.111	
6	Zacatepec 1948	54	28	1.929	
7	Cachorros León	46	25	1.840	
8	Necaxa	47	26	1.807	
9	Tuzos UAZ	47	26	1.807	
10	Lobos Prepa	49	28	1.750	
11	Alacranes de Durango	42	24	1.750	
12	Pumas Naucalpan	47	28	1.679	
13	Cachorros UANL	42	26	1.615	
14	Cuautla	45	28	1.607	
15	Reyes de Texcoco	43	28	1.536	
16	La Piedad	39	26	1.500	
17	Tecamachalco Sur	42	28	1.500	
18	Cañoneros de Campeche	40	28	1.429	
19	Oro	37	26	1.423	
20	Irapuato	34	25	1.360	
21	Álamos	30	27	1.111	
22	Atlético Tapatío	30	28	1.071	
23	Topos de Reynosa	25	25	1.000	
24	Colegio Once México	21	26	0.808	
25	Bavaria Tultitlán	22	28	0.786	
26	Centro Universitario del Fútbol	18	28	0.643	
27	Alfareros de Tonalá	12	25	0.480	
28	Astros	9	28	0.321	
29	Indios	18	13	1.3846	Disenrolled
30	Orinegros de Ciudad Madero	2	8	0.250	Dissolved

Last updated: 21 April 2012
Source: Segunda División FMF
P = Position; G = Games played; Pts = Points; Pts/G = Ratio of points to games played

== Promotion Final ==
The Final de Ascenso de la Liga de Nuevos Talentos 2012 was the promotion final between the champions of the Apertura 2011 and Clausura 2012 tournaments to determine the club promoted to Liga Premier de Ascenso. The first leg was played on 23 May 2012, and the second leg was played on 26 May 2012.

Team 1	Agg.	Team 2	1st leg	2nd leg
Estudiantes Tecos B	2–4	Atlas B	2–2	0–2

=== First leg ===
23 May 2012	Atlas B	2–2	Estudiantes Tecos B	Zapopan
18:00	Díaz 36'; Ramírez 61'	Report	Ramos 26'; Aguayo 89'	Stadium: Estadio Alfredo "Pistache" Torres; Attendance: 600; Referee: Rodrigo Cervantes Muñoz

=== Second leg ===
26 May 2012	Estudiantes Tecos B	0–2 (2–4 agg.)	Atlas B	Zapopan
20:00		Report	Sánchez 26'; Mejía 33'	Stadium: Estadio Tres de Marzo; Attendance: 3,000; Referee: Marco Antonio Hernández Ramírez

2011–12 season winners

1st title

== See also ==
- 2011–12 Mexican Primera División season
- 2011–12 Liga de Ascenso season
- 2011–12 Liga Premier de Ascenso season
