= 2013–14 Liga de Nuevos Talentos season =

Liga de Nuevos Talentos
- Season: 2013–14
- Dates: 9 August 2013 – 24 May 2014
- Champions: Apertura: Pioneros; Clausura; Selva Cañera
- Promoted: Tecamachalco; Zitácuaro; Celaya "B"
- Relegated: Atlante Tabasco
- Matches: 392
- Goals: 1,246 (3.18 per match)
- Top goalscorer: Apertura: Kevin Carrasco (12 goals); Clausura; Ricardo Álvarez (19 goals)
- Biggest home win: Apertura: Académicos 6–0 Mineros de Fresnillo (31 August 2013); Clausura; Pioneros de Cancún 10–0 Atlante Tabasco (22 March 2014)
- Biggest away win: Apertura: Selva Cañera 0–4 Tulancingo (11 August 2013); Clausura; Promesas Altamira 2–8 Calor (2 February 2014)
- Highest scoring: Apertura: Pioneros de Cancún (35 points); Clausura; Selva Cañera (35 points)
- Stats are from the regular season only

The 2013–14 Liga de Nuevos Talentos season was split in two tournaments Apertura and Clausura. Liga de Nuevos Talentos was the fourth–tier football league of Mexico. The season was played between 9 August 2013 and 24 May 2014.

== Torneo Apertura ==
=== Changes from the previous season ===
- Tecamachalco "B" was promoted from Tercera División, however, the team was moved to Oaxaca and was rebranded as Alebrijes de Oaxaca, becoming the reserve team of the Ascenso MX team.
- Zacatepec was renamed as Selva Cañera, becoming the reserve team of the Ascenso MX team.
- C.D. Oro was moved to Soledad de Graciano Sánchez, became the reserve team of Atlético San Luis. Unofficially, the team received the name of Santos de Soledad.
- Tuzos UAZ was moved to Fresnillo and was rebranded as Mineros de Fresnillo F.C.
- Excélsior F.C. was acquired by new owners, for that reason, the team was moved to San Juan de los Lagos and was rebranded as Deportivo San Juan.

=== Stadiums and Locations ===
==== Group 1 ====
Location of teams in the 2013–14 LNT Group 1

Club	City	Stadium	Capacity
Alebrijes "B"	Oaxaca, Oaxaca	Benito Juárez	10,250
América Coapa	Mexico City	Instalaciones Club América	1,000
Atlante Tabasco	Villahermosa, Tabasco	CAR Atlante Tabasco	1,000
Atlético Chiapas	Tuxtla Gutiérrez, Chiapas	Víctor Manuel Reyna	29,001
Cañoneros	Campeche, Campeche	Universitario de Campeche	4,000
Centro Universitario del Fútbol	San Agustín Tlaxiaca, Hidalgo	Universidad del Fútbol	1,000
Cuautla	Cuautla, Morelos	Isidro Gil Tapia	5,000
Deportivo Chimalhuacán	Chimalhuacán, State of Mexico	Tepalcates	5,000
Lobos Prepa	Puebla, Puebla	Universitario BUAP	19,283
Pioneros de Cancún	Cancún, Quintana Roo	Cancún 86	6,390
Pumas Naucalpan	Mexico City	La Cantera	2,000
Selva Cañera	Zacatepec, Morelos	Agustín Coruco Díaz	24,313
Tulancingo	Tulancingo, Hidalgo	Primero de Mayo	2,500
UAEH	Pachuca, Hidalgo	Revolución Mexicana	3,500
Zitácuaro	Zitácuaro, Michoacán	Ignacio López Rayón	10,000

==== Group 2 ====
Location of teams in the 2013–14 LNT Group 2

Club	City	Stadium	Capacity
Académicos de Atlas	El Salto, Jalisco	CECAF	1,000
Atlético San Luis "B"	San Luis Potosí, S.L.P.	Alfonso Lastras	25,111
Cachorros UANL	General Zuazua, Nuevo León	Instalaciones de Zuazua	800
Calor	Gómez Palacio, Durango	Unidad Deportiva Francisco Gómez Palacio	4,000
Celaya "B"	Celaya, Guanajuato	Miguel Alemán Valdés	23,182
Chivas Rayadas	Zapopan, Jalisco	Verde Valle	800
Deportivo San Juan	San Juan de los Lagos, Jalisco	El Llanito	5,000
La Piedad	La Piedad, Michoacán	Juan N. López	13,356
Mineros de Fresnillo	Fresnillo, Zacatecas	Unidad Deportiva Minera Fresnillo	2,500
Necaxa "B"	Aguascalientes, Aguascalientes	Casa Club Necaxa	1,000
Promesas Altamira	Altamira, Tamaulipas	Deportivo Sur de Tamaulipas	1,000
Santos Los Mochis	Los Mochis, Sinaloa	Centenario	11,134
Topos de Reynosa	Reynosa, Tamaulipas	Unidad Deportiva Solidaridad	20,000
UMSNH	Morelia, Michoacán	Olímpico UMSNH	4,000

=== Regular season ===
==== Group 1 ====
===== Standings =====
Pos	Team	Pld	W	D	L	GF	GA	GD	Pts	Qualification
1	Pioneros de Cancún	14	10	3	1	37	13	+24	35	Advance to Liguilla de Liga
2	América Coapa	14	7	5	2	32	20	+12	31	Advance to Liguilla de Copa
3	Atlético Chiapas	14	7	3	4	27	22	+5	27	Advance to Liguilla de Liga
4	Centro Universitario del Futbol	14	7	4	3	23	22	+1	27	Advance to Liguilla de Copa
5	Cuautla	14	7	3	4	26	22	+4	26	Advance to Liguilla de Liga
6	Deportivo Chimalhuacán	14	7	3	4	24	23	+1	26	Advance to Liguilla de Liga
7	Cañoneros de Campeche	14	6	2	6	20	14	+6	22	Advance to Liguilla de Copa
8	UAEH	14	5	6	3	14	12	+2	22	Advance to Liguilla de Copa
9	Tulancingo	14	5	4	5	25	24	+1	22	
10	Pumas Naucalpan	14	5	4	5	24	20	+4	19	
11	Selva Cañera	14	5	3	6	22	22	0	19	
12	Alebrijes "B"	14	4	4	6	20	27	−7	19	
13	Lobos Prepa	14	4	2	8	16	32	−16	14	
14	Atlante Tabasco	14	1	1	12	16	36	−20	4	
15	Zitácuaro	14	0	3	11	15	35	−20	3	

Source: SoccerWay

===== Results =====
Home \ Away	ALB	AME	ATB	ATC	CAN	CUF	CUA	DCH	LOB	PCN	PUM	SVC	TUL	UEH	ZIT
Alebrijes		0–3							1–2	2–3	1–1		0–0		2–1
América Coapa				2–2	2–3	2–1	5–2	2–2				0–0		3–1	
Atlante Tabasco	2–4	2–4		2–4	0–2	1–2			3–0	0–4		1–2			
Atlético Chiapas	4–0									1–1	2–1	2–0	3–1		3–1
Cañoneros	2–2			4–0							2–0	3–1	0–1		3–0
Centro Universitario	2–2			3–0	1–0		3–2	1–1				1–1		1–2	
Cuautla	3–1		2–1	3–1	1–0							2–1	2–2	0–0	3–2
Dep. Chimalhuacán	0–2		4–0	3–2	2–0		1–4					1–3	3–1	1–0	
Lobos Prepa		3–3		0–2	2–1	1–1	1–0	1–3						1–3	
Pioneros		1–0			2–0	5–0	3–1	5–0	5–1					3–1	
Pumas Naucalpan		1–1	4–2			1–3	1–1	0–1	3–0	4–0				0–1	
Selva Cañera	5–1							1–0		1–1	2–3		0–4		5–1
Tulancingo		1–2	3–0			2–4			2–1	2–2	2–2				4–2
UAEH	1–1		2–1	1–1	0–0							2–0	0–0		0–0
Zitácuaro		1–3	0–0			2–3		2–2	1–2	0–2	2–3				

Updated to match(es) played on 16 November 2013. Source: SoccerWay
Legend: Blue = home team win; Yellow = draw; Red = away team win.

==== Group 2 ====
===== Standings =====
Pos	Team	Pld	W	D	L	GF	GA	GD	Pts	Qualification
1	Chivas Rayadas	13	9	3	1	23	8	+15	33	Advance to Liguilla de Copa
2	Atlético San Luis "B"	13	9	2	2	29	10	+19	31	Advance to Liguilla de Liga
3	Académicos	13	9	0	4	27	9	+18	30	Advance to Liguilla de Copa
4	Deportivo San Juan	13	6	2	5	24	24	0	23	Advance to Liguilla de Liga
5	Promesas Altamira	13	6	4	3	19	17	+2	22	Advance to Liguilla de Liga
6	Calor	13	6	2	5	19	20	−1	22	Advance to Liguilla de Liga
7	Santos Los Mochis	13	6	2	5	27	23	+4	21	Advance to Liguilla de Copa
8	UMSNH	13	6	3	4	19	20	−1	21	Advance to Liguilla de Copa
9	Necaxa "B"	13	4	5	4	19	26	−7	18	
10	La Piedad	13	5	2	6	22	23	−1	17	
11	Celaya "B"	13	3	3	7	17	24	−7	13	
12	Cachorros UANL	13	3	2	8	13	18	−5	11	
13	Mineros de Fresnillo	13	2	3	8	15	29	−14	9	
14	Topos de Reynosa	13	0	1	12	7	36	−29	1	

Source: SoccerWay

===== Results =====
Home \ Away	ACD	ASL	UNL	CAL	CEL	CHR	DSJ	LAP	MFR	NEC	PRA	SLM	TPR	UMS
Académicos		0–1	3–1		3–0		2–0		6–0		0–1		1–0	
Atlético San Luis				4–0		1–1				3–1		2–1	4–0	4–0
Cachorros UANL		0–0					1–2		2–1	0–3	1–1	0–1	5–0	
Calor			1–0		1–0	2–1	3–2		2–2		4–1			
Celaya		1–3	2–0				1–2		2–0	0–2	1–2		1–1	
Chivas Rayadas	2–0		2–1	3–1	1–0			3–2						0–1
Dep. San Juan		2–1				1–3		2–3		2–1		3–3		0–1
La Piedad	1–3	1–2	0–1	2–1	2–2				3–0					3–0
Mineros Fresnillo		1–3				0–1	3–3			1–2	3–0	1–2		
Necaxa	0–2			1–1		1–1			1–1			4–2	4–0	0–0
Promesas Altamira		2–0				0–0	1–3	3–1		1–1		5–2		
Santos Los Mochis	1–2			1–0	3–3	0–3		3–0					5–0	
Topos				1–3		0–3	1–2	2–3	1–2		0–1			1–2
UMSNH	0–4		2–1	2–0	6–2				1–1		1–1			

Updated to match(es) played on 16 November 2013. Source: SoccerWay
Legend: Blue = home team win; Yellow = draw; Red = away team win.

=== Regular season statistics ===
==== Top goalscorers ====
Players sorted first by goals scored, then by last name.

Rank	Player	Club	Goals
1	(Mexico) Kevín Carrasco	Alebrijes de Oaxaca	12
1	(Mexico) Efraín Torres	Atlético San Luis	12
3	(Mexico) César Vallejo	Deportivo San Juan	11
4	(Mexico) Ángel de Jesús Manzo	La Piedad	10
5	(Mexico) Ricardo Álvarez	Centro Universitario del Fútbol	9
5	(Mexico) Francisco Israel Rivera	América Coapa	9
5	(Mexico) Omar Rojas	Cuautla	9
5	(Mexico) Ulises de Jesús Tavares	Pumas Naucalpan	9
5	(Mexico) Luis Brayan Zúñiga	Atlante Tabasco	9
10	(Mexico) Édgar Jiménez	Tulancingo	8

Source: Liga Premier

=== Liguilla ===
==== Liguilla de Ascenso (Promotion Playoffs) ====
The four best teams of each group play two games against each other on a home-and-away basis. The higher seeded teams play on their home field during the second leg. The winner of each match up is determined by aggregate score. In the quarterfinals and semifinals, if the two teams are tied on aggregate the higher seeded team advances. In the final, if the two teams are tied after both legs, the match goes to extra time and, if necessary, a penalty shoot-out.

Quarter-finals
1	Pioneros de Cancún	1	1	2
15	Calor	1	0	1
8	Cuautla	2	3	5
9	Dep. Chimalhuacán	0	1	1
3	Atlético San Luis	0	1	1
12	Promesas Altamira	1	0	1
6	Atlético Chiapas	1	4	5
10	Deportivo San Juan	2	1	3

Semi-finals
1	Pioneros de Cancún	0	3	3
4	Cuautla	1	0	1
2	Atlético San Luis	2	1	3
3	Atlético Chiapas	1	1	2

Final
1	Pioneros de Cancún	0	3	3
2	Atlético San Luis	0	1	1

==== Quarter-finals ====
Team 1	Agg.	Team 2	1st leg	2nd leg
Pioneros de Cancún	2–1	Calor	1–1	1–0
Atlético San Luis	1–1	Promesas Altamira	0–1	1–0
Atlético Chiapas	5–3	Deportivo San Juan	1–2	4–1
Cuautla	5–1	Deportivo Chimalhuacán	2–0	3–1

===== First leg =====
27 November 2013	Calor	0–1	Pioneros de Cancún	Gómez Palacio
15:00		Report		Stadium: Unidad Deportiva Gómez Palacio; Attendance: 100; Referee: Hernán Ramírez Díaz

27 November 2013	Promesas Altamira	1–0	Atlético San Luis	Altamira
16:00		Report		Stadium: Estadio Altamira; Attendance: 500; Referee: Mario Humberto Vargas Mata

27 November 2013	Deportivo San Juan	2–1	Atlético Chiapas	San Juan de los Lagos
20:00		Report		Stadium: Estadio Antonio R. Márquez; Attendance: 350; Referee: Oziel Méndez de Anda

28 November 2013	Deportivo Chimalhuacán	0–2	C.D. Cuautla	Chimalhuacán
16:00		Report		Stadium: Estadio Tepalcates; Attendance: 500; Referee: Edgar Allan Morales Olvera

===== Second leg =====
30 November 2013	Pioneros de Cancún	1-1 (2–1 agg.)	Calor	Cancún
15:00	Alvarado 88'	Report	Flores 22'	Stadium: Estadio Cancún 86; Attendance: 1,800; Referee: Gilberto Alvarado Farjat

30 November 2013	Atlético Chiapas	4–1 (5–3 agg.)	Deportivo San Juan	Tuxtla Gutiérrez
15:00	Zuart 11'; Tello 44', 93'; Reyes 84'	Report	Vallejo 16'	Stadium: Estadio Víctor Manuel Reyna; Attendance: 1,200; Referee: Christopher Molina Díaz

30 November 2013	Atlético San Luis	1–0 (1–1 agg.)	Promesas Altamira	San Luis Potosí
16:00	Ríos 33'	Report		Stadium: Estadio Plan de San Luis; Attendance: 3,000; Referee: José Luis Muñóz Pantoja

1 December 2013	Cuautla	3–1 (5–1 agg.)	Deportivo Chimalhuacán	Cuautla
15:30	Martínez 33'; Rojas 53'; Pérez 85'	Report	Bastida 67'	Stadium: Estadio Isidro Gil Tapia; Attendance: 1,500; Referee: Adalid Maganda Villalva

==== Semi-finals ====
Team 1	Agg.	Team 2	1st leg	2nd leg
Pioneros de Cancún	3–1	Cuautla	0–1	3–0
Atlético San Luis	3–2	Atlético Chiapas	1–2	1–1

===== First leg =====
4 December 2013	Atlético Chiapas	1–2	Atlético San Luis	Tuxtla Gutiérrez
15:00	Reyes 77'	Report	Torres 3'; Nava 84'	Stadium: Estadio Víctor Manuel Reyna; Attendance: 2,500; Referee: Luis Alberto Mattern García

4 December 2013	Cuautla	1–0	Pioneros de Cancún	Cuautla
15:30	Alvarado 2'	Report		Stadium: Estadio Isidro Gil Tapia; Attendance: 1,000; Referee: Óscar Mejía García

===== Second leg =====
7 December 2013	Pioneros de Cancún	3–0 (3–1 agg.)	Cuautla	Cancún
15:00	Hurtado 24'; Martínez 57'; Pastrana 89'	Report		Stadium: Estadio Cancún 86; Attendance: 3,500; Referee: Carlos Javier Ríos García

7 December 2013	Atlético San Luis	1–1 (3–2 agg.)	Atlético Chiapas	San Luis Potosí
16:00	Guerrero 29'	Report	Zuart 72'	Stadium: Estadio Plan de San Luis; Referee: Antonio de Jesús Olalde Vázquez

==== Final ====
Team 1	Agg.	Team 2	1st leg	2nd leg
Pioneros de Cancún	3–1	Atlético San Luis	0–0	3–1

===== First leg =====
12 December 2013	Atlético San Luis	0-0	Pioneros de Cancún	San Luis Potosí
16:00		Report		Stadium: Estadio Plan de San Luis; Attendance: 5,500; Referee: Christian Adrián Ramírez Tejeda

===== Second leg =====
15 December 2013	Pioneros de Cancún	3–1 (3–1 agg.)	Atlético San Luis	Cancún
12:00		Report		Stadium: Estadio Cancún 86; Attendance: 5,500; Referee: Carlos Javier Ríos García

Apertura 2013 winners:

1st title

=== Cup tournament (Torneo Apertura) ===
Quarter-finals
2	Chivas Rayadas	3	1	4
13	UAEH	2	0	2
5	Académicos	2	1	3
11	Cañoneros	2	2	4
4	América Coapa	3	3	6
17	UMSNH	2	1	3
7	Centro Universitario	2	3	5
16	Santos Los Mochis	3	1	4

Semi-finals
2	Chivas Rayadas	0	3	3
11	Cañoneros	1	2	3
4	América Coapa	3	2	5
7	Centro Universitario	3	0	3

Final
2	Chivas Rayadas	2	4	6
4	América Coapa	2	2	4

Apertura 2013 winners:

1st title

== Torneo Clausura ==
=== Regular season ===
==== Group 1 ====
===== Standings =====
Pos	Team	Pld	W	D	L	GF	GA	GD	Pts	Qualification
1	Selva Cañera	14	11	0	3	31	12	+19	35	Advance to Liguilla de Liga
2	Pumas Naucalpan	14	10	2	2	28	15	+13	34	Advance to Liguilla de Copa
3	Tulancingo	14	8	3	3	31	15	+16	33	Advance to Liguilla de Liga
4	América Coapa	14	9	2	3	30	17	+13	33	Advance to Liguilla de Copa
5	Cuautla	14	9	0	5	25	18	+7	29	Advance to Liguilla de Liga
6	Pioneros de Cancún	14	7	4	3	31	17	+14	26	Advance to Liguilla de Liga
7	Centro Universitario del Futbol	14	6	2	6	37	27	+10	22	Advance to Liguilla de Copa
8	Lobos Prepa	14	6	1	7	30	25	+5	21	Advance to Liguilla de Copa
9	Cañoneros de Campeche	14	6	3	5	15	12	+3	21	
10	Zitácuaro	14	5	2	7	21	27	−6	18	
11	Alebrijes de Oaxaca	14	5	1	8	18	18	0	16	
12	UAEH	14	3	5	6	17	24	−7	16	
13	Atlético Chiapas	14	3	2	9	17	28	−11	11	
14	Deportivo Chimalhuacán	14	3	1	10	15	31	−16	11	
15	Atlante Tabasco	14	0	0	14	4	64	−60	0	

Source: SoccerWay

===== Results =====
Home \ Away	ALB	AME	ATB	ATC	CAN	CUF	CUA	DCH	LOB	PCN	PUM	SVC	TUL	UEH	ZIT
Alebrijes			4–0	1–0	0–1	2–1	2–3	2–0				0–1		1–1	
América Coapa	3–2		2–0						3–1	3–1	2–1		1–1		2–3
Atlante Tabasco							1–4	0–3			1–2		1–5	0–3	0–3
Atlético Chiapas		3–3	2–0		0–1	1–1	1–2	2–0	0–2					3–2	
Cañoneros		1–0	3–0			2–3	0–1	3–1	2–2	0–0				1–0	
CU Fútbol		1–3	10–1						2–1	3–3	1–2		2–4		4–2
Cuautla		0–3				0–2		4–0	2–1	0–1	1–2				
Dep. Chimalhuacán		1–2				2–5			3–1	1–1	0–4				3–1
Lobos Prepa	2–0		5–0							3–1	2–5	0–2	2–4		5–1
Pioneros	2–1		10–0	4–1							2–0	2–0	0–2		2–1
Pumas Naucalpan	2–1			3–2	1–0							2–0	2–1		1–1
Selva Cañera		2–1	8–0	4–1	2–0	2–1	1–4	1–0						5–1	
Tulancingo	0–1			3–0	0–0		3–1	3–0				0–2		2–2	
UAEH		0–2				2–1	0–1	2–1	0–3	2–2	1–1				
Zitácuaro	2–1			2–1	2–1		1–2					0–1	1–3	1–1	

Updated to match(es) played on 19 April 2014. Source: SoccerWay
Legend: Blue = home team win; Yellow = draw; Red = away team win.

==== Group 2 ====
===== Standings =====
Pos	Team	Pld	W	D	L	GF	GA	GD	Pts	Qualification
1	Chivas Rayadas	13	10	1	2	35	11	+24	34	Advance to Liguilla de Copa
2	Académicos	13	7	4	2	28	16	+12	32	Advance to Liguilla de Copa
3	Calor	13	6	5	2	27	15	+12	24	Advance to Liguilla de Liga
4	Atlético San Luis "B"	13	6	5	2	18	13	+5	23	Advance to Liguilla de Liga
5	Santos Los Mochis	13	6	4	3	12	12	0	23	Advance to Liguilla de Liga
6	Deportivo San Juan	13	6	2	5	24	24	0	22	Advance to Liguilla de Liga
7	Necaxa "B"	13	5	4	4	24	13	+11	19	Advance to Liguilla de Copa
8	Celaya "B"	13	4	3	6	20	22	−2	17	Advance to Liguilla de Copa
9	La Piedad	13	4	3	6	16	21	−5	17	
10	Cachorros UANL	13	3	4	6	19	25	−6	15	
11	Topos de Reynosa	13	2	5	6	12	16	−4	13	
12	Promesas Altamira	13	3	3	7	11	30	−19	12	
13	UMSNH	13	2	4	7	14	23	−9	11	
14	Mineros de Fresnillo	13	1	5	7	15	30	−15	8	

Source: SoccerWay

===== Results =====
Home \ Away	ACD	ASL	UNL	CAL	CEL	CHR	DSJ	LAP	MFR	NEC	PRA	SLM	TPR	UMS
Académicos				1–2		1–4		3–0		2–2		3–0		2–2
Atlético San Luis	0–0		3–1		3–3		2–0	1–0	2–0		1–1			
Cachorros UANL	2–4			2–2	2–1	2–3		1–0						2–2
Calor		2–3				2–0		1–1		2–1		3–0	1–1	1–0
Celaya	0–2			1–1		1–3		1–4				1–1		4–1
Chivas Rayadas		3–0					5–0		4–1	1–1	4–0	1–2	2–0	
Dep. San Juan	2–3		3–2	2–1	1–2				2–2		3–1		1–0	
La Piedad						1–4	0–3			1–1	2–0	0–2	1–1	
Mineros Fresnillo	2–2		2–1	1–1	1–4			2–4					2–5	1–1
Necaxa		0–1	4–1		2–1		4–0		1–1		5–0			
Promesas Altamira	0–2		0–2	2–8	1–0				2–0				1–1	2–1
Santos Los Mochis		1–1	0–0				0–1		1–0	1–0	1–1			
Topos	0–3	0–0	1–1		0–1					2–0		0–1		
UMSNH		0–2				0–1	1–1	1–2		0–3		1–2	2–1	

Updated to match(es) played on 19 April 2014. Source: SoccerWay
Legend: Blue = home team win; Yellow = draw; Red = away team win.

=== Regular season statistics ===
==== Top goalscorers ====
Players sorted first by goals scored, then by last name.

Rank	Player	Club	Goals
1	(Mexico) Ricardo Álvarez	Centro Universitario	19
2	(Mexico) Edgar Jiménez	Tulancingo	11
3	(Mexico) Jesús Martín Caballero	Zitácuaro	10
4	(Mexico) Carlos Cauich	Pioneros de Cancún	9
4	(Mexico) Jesús Gallardo	Pumas Naucalpan	9
4	(Mexico) Ángel de Jesús Manzo	La Piedad	9
4	(Mexico) Luis Alberto Márquez	Chivas Rayadas	9
4	(Mexico) Hugo Navarro	Pioneros de Cancún	9

Source: Liga Premier

=== Liguilla ===
==== Liguilla de Ascenso (Promotion Playoffs) ====
The four best teams of each group play two games against each other on a home-and-away basis. The higher seeded teams play on their home field during the second leg. The winner of each match up is determined by aggregate score. In the quarterfinals and semifinals, if the two teams are tied on aggregate the higher seeded team advances. In the final, if the two teams are tied after both legs, the match goes to extra time and, if necessary, a penalty shoot-out.

Quarter-finals
1	Selva Cañera	2	2	4
13	Deportivo San Juan	3	1	4
4	Tulancingo	0	0	0
11	Santos Los Mochis	4	3	7
7	Cuautla	0	1	1
10	Atlético San Luis	3	1	4
8	Pioneros de Cancún	2	2	4
9	Calor	1	0	1

Semi-finals
1	Selva Cañera	1	3	4
11	Santos Los Mochis	0	0	0
8	Pioneros de Cancún	0	2	2
10	Atlético San Luis	3	1	4

Final
1	Selva Cañera	2	5	7
10	Atlético San Luis	2	1	3

==== Quarter-finals ====
Team 1	Agg.	Team 2	1st leg	2nd leg
Selva Cañera	4–4	Deportivo San Juan	2–3	2–1
Tulancingo	0–7	Santos Los Mochis	0–4	0–3
Cuautla	1–4	Atlético San Luis	0–3	1–1
Pioneros de Cancún	4–1	Calor	2–1	2–0

===== First leg =====
26 April 2014	Calor	1–2	Pioneros de Cancún	Gómez Palacio
16:00	Gómez 9'	Report	Cauich 12'; Pastrana 55'	Stadium: Unidad Deportiva Francsico Gómez Palacio; Attendance: 100

26 April 2014	Atlético San Luis	3–0	Cuautla	San Luis Potosí
16:00	Lara 12'; Medina 81'; Torres 86'	Report		Stadium: Estadio Plan de San Luis; Attendance: 2,000

26 April 2014	Santos Los Mochis	4–0	Tulancingo	Los Mochis
19:00	Moreno 5', 42'; Aguirre 59'; Ruíz 77'	Report		Stadium: Estadio Centenario; Attendance: 1,000

27 April 2014	Deportivo San Juan	3–2	Selva Cañera	San Juan de los Lagos
20:00	Torres 63'; Valdespino 69'; García 72'	Report	Vega 3'; Bustos	Stadium: Estadio Antonio R. Márquez; Attendance: 200

===== Second leg =====
3 May 2014	Pioneros de Cancún	2–0 (4–1 agg.)	Calor	Cancún
16:00	Cauich 26'; Navarro 32'	[ Report		Stadium: Estadio Cancún 86; Attendance: 1,300

4 May 2014	Tulancingo	0–3 (0–7 agg.)	Santos Los Mochis	Tulancingo
12:00		Report	Mariscal 36'; Ruíz 51'; López 71' (own)	Stadium: Estadio Primero de Mayo; Attendance: 500

4 May 2014	Selva Cañera	2–1 (3–3 agg.)	Deportivo San Juan	Xochitepec
16:00	Moncada 41'; Moreno 64'	Report	Valdespino 36'	Stadium: Estadio Mariano Matamoros; Attendance: 300

4 May 2014	Cuautla	1–1 (1–4 agg.)	Atlético San Luis	Cuautla
16:00	Abundez 90+1'	Report	Torres 8'	Stadium: Estadio Isidro Gil Tapia; Attendance: 500

==== Semi-finals ====
Team 1	Agg.	Team 2	1st leg	2nd leg
Selva Cañera	4–0	Santos Los Mochis	1–0	3–0
Pioneros de Cancún	2–4	Atlético San Luis	0–3	2–1

===== First leg =====
7 May 2014	Atlético San Luis	3–0	Pioneros de Cancún	San Luis Potosí
17:00	Torres 22', 32', 70'	Report		Stadium: Estadio Plan de San Luis; Attendance: 1,500

8 May 2014	Santos Los Mochis	0–1	Selva Cañera	Los Mochis
19:00		Report	Velázquez 84'	Stadium: Estadio Centenario; Attendance: 2,000

===== Second leg =====
10 May 2014	Pioneros de Cancún	2–1 (2–4 agg.)	Atlético San Luis	Cancún
16:00	Cauich 56', 81'	Report	Zárate 16'	Stadium: Estadio Cancún 86; Attendance: 4,000

11 May 2014	Selva Cañera	3–0 (4–0 agg.)	Santos Los Mochis	Xochitepec
16:00	Bustos 12'; Moncada 61'; Moreno 81'	Report		Stadium: Estadio Mariano Matamoros; Attendance: 1,500

==== Final ====
Team 1	Agg.	Team 2	1st leg	2nd leg
Selva Cañera	7–3	Atlético San Luis	2–2	5–1

===== First leg =====
15 May 2014	Atlético San Luis	2–2	Selva Cañera	San Luis Potosí
17:00	Torres 7', 72'	Report	Moreno 83'; Collazo 90'	Stadium: Estadio Plan de San Luis; Attendance: 8,000

===== Second leg =====
18 May 2014	Selva Cañera	5–1 (7–3 agg.)	Atlético San Luis	Xochitepec
16:00	Bustos 1', 9', 37'; Guerrero 23' (own); Moreno 75'	Report	Torres 81'	Stadium: Estadio Mariano Matamoros; Attendance: 5,500

Clausura 2014 winners:

1st title

=== Cup tournament (Torneo Clausura) ===
Quarter-finals
2	Chivas Rayadas	2	0	2
18	Celaya	0	0	0
3	Pumas Naucalpan	1	0	1
14	Lobos Prepa	3	1	4
5	América Coapa	1	4	5
15	Centro Universitario	0	0	0
6	Académicos	3	2	5
16	Necaxa	0	1	1

Semi-finals
2	Chivas Rayadas	3	2	5
14	Lobos Prepa	0	2	2
5	Académicos	1	1	2
6	América Coapa	0	0	0

Final
2	Chivas Rayadas	0	2	2
5	Académicos	0	1	1

Clausura 2014 winners:

2nd title

== Relegation Table ==
P	Team	Pts	G	Pts/G
1	Chivas Rayadas	67	26	2.58
2	Académicos de Atlas	62	26	2.38
3	América Coapa	64	28	2.29
4	Pioneros de Cancún	61	28	2.18
5	Atlético San Luis	64	26	2.46
6	Tulancingo	55	28	1.96
7	Cuautla	55	28	1.96
8	Selva Cañera	54	28	1.93
9	Pumas Naucalpan	53	28	1.89
10	Calor	46	26	1.77
11	Centro Universitario del Fútbol	49	28	1.75
12	Deportivo San Juan	45	26	1.73
13	Santos Los Mochis	44	26	1.69
14	Cañoneros	43	28	1.54
15	Necaxa	37	26	1.42
16	Garzas UAEH	38	28	1.36
17	Atlético Chiapas	38	28	1.36
18	Deportivo Chimalhuacán	37	28	1.32
19	La Piedad	34	26	1.31
20	Promesas Altamira	34	26	1.31
21	Lobos Prepa	35	28	1.25
22	Alebrijes	35	28	1.25
23	Zorros UMSNH	32	26	1.23
24	Celaya	30	26	1.15
25	Cachorros UANL	26	26	1.00
26	Zitácuaro	21	28	0.64
27	Mineros de Fresnillo	17	26	0.65
28	Topos de Reynosa	14	26	0.54
29	Atlante Tabasco	4	28	0.14

Last updated: 19 April 2014
Source: Liga Premier FMF
P = Position; G = Games played; Pts = Points; Pts/G = Ratio of points to games played

== Promotion Final ==
The Promotion Final is a series of matches played by the champions of the tournaments Apertura and Clausura, the game was played to determine the winning team of the promotion to Liga Premier de Ascenso. The first leg was played on 21 May 2014, and the second leg was played on 24 May 2014.

Team 1	Agg.	Team 2	1st leg	2nd leg
Pioneros de Cancún	2–1	Selva Cañera	0–1	1–1

=== First leg ===
21 May 2014	Selva Cañera	0–1	Pioneros de Cancún	Xochitepec
16:00		Report	Cauich 41'	Stadium: Estadio Mariano Matamoros; Attendance: 2,500

=== Second leg ===
24 May 2014	Pioneros de Cancún	1–1 (2–1 agg.)	Selva Cañera	Cancún
16:00	Tun 16'	Report	Álvarez 48'	Stadium: Estadio Cancún 86; Attendance: 8,000

2013-14 season winners:

1st title

== See also ==
- 2013–14 Liga MX season
- 2013–14 Ascenso MX season
- 2013–14 Liga Premier de Ascenso season
