= 2008–09 Liga de Nuevos Talentos season =

Liga de Nuevos Talentos
- Season: 2008–09
- Dates: 29 August 2008 – 23 May 2009
- Champions: Apertura: Garzas UAEH; Clausura; América Coapa
- Promoted: None
- Relegated: Atlante Tabasco
- Stats are from the regular season only

The 2008–09 Liga de Nuevos Talentos season was split in two tournaments Apertura and Clausura. Liga de Nuevos Talentos was the fourth-tier football league of Mexico. The season was played between 29 August 2008 and 23 May 2009.

As of this season, the Segunda División de México was divided into different branches: the Liga Premier de Ascenso for the more developed teams that have aspirations for promotion to Liga de Ascenso and the Liga de Nuevos Talentos for those clubs with less infrastructure.

== Teams ==
=== Sureste Zone ===
Location of teams in the 2008–09 LNT Group 1

Club	City	Stadium	Capacity
Alebrijes de Oaxaca	Oaxaca City, Oaxaca	General Manuel Cabrera Carrasquedo	3,000
Atlante Tabasco	Villahermosa, Tabasco	CEFOR Atlante Tabasco	1,000
Cuautla	Cuautla, Morelos	Isidro Gil Tapia	5,000
Deportivo Contreras	Magdalena Contreras, Mexico City	Unidad Deportiva Primero de Mayo	1,000
Gallos Blancos de Izcalli	Gustavo A. Madero, Mexico City	Deportivo Los Galeana	2,000
Halcones del Valle del Mezquital	Tezontepec, Hidalgo	San Juan	3,000
Inter Tehuacán	Tehuacán, Puebla	Polideportivo La Huizachera; El Moral	2,000; 1,000
Lobos Prepa	Puebla, Puebla	Ciudad Universitaria Puebla	1,000
Puebla	Puebla, Puebla	Unidad Deportiva Mario Vázquez Raña	800
Titanes de Tulancingo	Tulancingo, Hidalgo	Primero de Mayo	2,500
Garzas UAEH	Pachuca, Hidalgo	Revolución Mexicana; Club Hidalguense	3,500; 600

=== Bajío Zone ===
Location of teams in the 2008–09 LNT Group 2

Club	City	Stadium	Capacity
Alto Rendimiento Tuzo	San Agustín Tlaxiaca, Hidalgo	Universidad del Fútbol	1,000
América Coapa	Mexico City	Instalaciones Club América	1,000
Atlas	Zapopan, Jalisco	Club Atlas Chapalita	1,000
Atlético Cihuatlán	Cihuatlán, Jalisco	El Llanito	5,000
Cadereyta	Cadereyta de Montes, Querétaro	Cadereyta	2,000
Chivas San Rafael	Guadalajara, Jalisco	Club Chivas San Rafael	800
Guadalajara	Zapopan, Jalisco	Verde Valle	800
Mapaches de Nueva Italia	Nueva Italia, Michoacán	Unidad Deportiva Rosendo Arnaiz	1,500
Monarcas Morelia	Morelia, Michoacán	Venustiano Carranza; Morelos practice field	17,600; 1,000
Oro	Zapopan, Jalisco	Club Deportivo U. de G.	3,000
Pumas Prepa	Mexico City	La Cantera	2,000
Toluca	Metepec, State of Mexico	Ixtapan 90	2,000

=== Noroeste Zone ===
Location of teams in the 2008–09 LNT Group 3

Club	City	Stadium	Capacity
Cachorros UANL	General Zuazua, Nuevo León	Instalaciones de Zuazua	800
Deportivo Durango	Durango City, Durango	Francisco Zarco	18,000
Deportivo Guamúchil	Guamúchil, Sinaloa	Alfredo Díaz Angulo	5,000
Durango Vizcaya	Guadalupe Victoria, Durango	Municipal Guadalupe Victoria	3,000
Huracanes de Matamoros	Matamoros, Tamaulipas	Pedro Salazar Maldonado	3,000
Indios	Ciudad Juárez, Chihuahua	Complejo Yvasa	2,000
Millonarios de La Joya	Guadalupe, Nuevo León	Unidad Deportiva La Talaverna	5,000
Rayados 2a	Monterrey, Nuevo León	Capital Deportiva	500
Real Saltillo Soccer	Saltillo, Coahuila	Olímpico Francisco I. Madero	7,000
Santos Laguna	Gómez Palacio, Durango	Santa Rita	1,000
U.A. Tamaulipas	Ciudad Victoria, Tamaulipas	Professor Eugenio Alvizo Porras	5,000
Tuzos UAZ	Fresnillo, Zacatecas	Minera Fresnillo	2,500

== Torneo Apertura ==
=== Regular season ===
==== Sureste Zone ====
===== League table =====
Pos	Team	Pld	W	D	L	GF	GA	GD	Pts	Qualification or relegation
1	Garzas UAEH	10	9	0	1	24	5	+19	27	Liguilla de Ascenso
2	Puebla	10	7	1	2	24	11	+13	23	
3	Lobos Prepa	10	4	4	2	12	11	+1	19	Liguilla de Filiales
4	Halcones del Valle del Mezquital	10	4	4	2	15	13	+2	18	Liguilla de Ascenso
5	Titanes de Tulancingo	10	3	4	3	16	12	+4	16	Liguilla de Ascenso
6	Gallos Blancos de Izcalli	10	2	4	4	12	15	−3	12	
7	Inter Tehuacán	10	1	5	4	9	13	−4	10	
8	Alebrijes de Oaxaca	10	2	3	5	8	14	−6	9	
9	Deportivo Contreras	10	2	3	5	11	18	−7	9	
10	Cuautla	10	1	5	4	4	13	−9	8	
11	Atlante Tabasco (Note: Atlante Tabasco only played until the Week 4.)	10	0	7	3	3	13	−10	7	

Source: RSSSF

===== Results =====
Home \ Away	ALE	ATL	CUA	CON	GBL	HVM	INT	LOB	PUE	TUL	UEH
Alebrijes de Oaxaca	—	3–2	1–0	—	—	—	1–1	1–1	—	—	0–2
Atlante Tabasco	—	—	—	—	—	—	—	—	1–3	—	—
Cuautla	—	—	—	0–2	2–1	0–0	—	—	0–6	—	—
Dep. Contreras	1–0	—	—	—	0–0	3–3	0–2	—	—	1–6	1–2
Gallos Blancos de Izcalli	1–1	—	—	—	—	4–5	1–0	—	—	—	0–2
Halcones VM	1–0	—	—	—	—	—	2–0	1–1	—	—	1–0
Inter Tehuacán	—	—	2–2	—	—	—	—	1–2	1–1	1–1	—
Lobos Prepa	—	—	0–0	3–2	2–1	—	—	—	1–2	—	—
Puebla	2–0	—	—	2–1	1–2	4–2	—	—	—	2–1	1–2
Tulancingo	3–1	—	0–0	—	2–2	1–0	—	1–2	—	—	—
Garzas UAEH	—	7–0	1–0	—	—	—	3–1	2–0	—	1–1	—

Source: Liga BBVA MX
Legend: Blue = home team win; Yellow = draw; Red = away team win.

==== Bajío Zone ====
- Note: Mapaches de Nueva Italia was registered in the tournament and participated in the first half of the tournament, however in October 2008 it was disenrolled by the FMF because its owners did not attend various subpoenas from the federation.

===== League table =====
Pos	Team	Pld	W	D	L	GF	GA	GD	Pts	Qualification or relegation
1	Guadalajara	10	8	2	0	27	5	+22	27	Liguilla de Filiales
2	Atlas	10	7	3	0	19	6	+13	27	Liguilla de Filiales
3	Alto Rendimiento Tuzo	10	7	2	1	22	4	+18	23	Liguilla de Ascenso
4	Toluca	10	5	2	3	18	11	+7	18	Liguilla de Filiales
5	Pumas Prepa	10	4	4	2	11	11	0	18	Liguilla de Filiales
6	América Coapa	10	4	3	3	10	9	+1	16	Liguilla de Ascenso
7	Chivas San Rafael	10	3	2	5	18	18	0	13	
8	Atlético Cihuatlán	10	2	3	5	8	11	−3	10	
9	Monarcas Morelia	10	2	0	8	11	23	−12	6	
10	Cadereyta	10	1	1	8	10	25	−15	4	
11	Oro	10	1	0	9	8	29	−21	3	
12	Mapaches de Nueva Italia	0	0	0	0	0	0	0	0	Disenrolled

Source: RSSSF

===== Results =====
Home \ Away	ART	AME	ATL	CIH	CAD	CHI	GUA	MAP	MON	ORO	PUM	TOL
Alto Rendimiento Tuzo	—	1–0	—	1–0	—	—	—	—	4–1	—	2–0	4–2
América	—	—	1–2	—	1–0	2–1	0–1	4–0	—	—	—	—
Atlas	2–2	—	—	—	3–0	—	1–1	—	—	3–0	2–0	1–0
Atlético Cihuatlán	—	0–0	1–1	—	—	0–0	—	0–0	2–0	3–0	—	—
Cadereyta	0–2	—	—	2–1	—	—	1–5	—	—	—	2–2	1–2
Chivas San Rafael	2–2	—	0–2	—	4–1	—	0–3	—	—	4–0	—	2–3
Guadalajara	6–2	—	—	3–0	—	—	—	—	5–1	—	0–0	1–0
Mapaches	—	—	1–3	—	2–2	—	2–1	—	—	—	—	—
Monarcas Morelia	—	2–3	1–2	—	2–1	2–3	—	1–1	—	—	—	—
Oro	1–2	2–3	—	—	3–2	—	0–2	—	0–2	—	—	—
Pumas Prepa	—	0–0	—	2–1	—	3–2	—	—	1–0	2–1	—	—
Toluca	—	0–0	—	2–0	—	—	—	—	2–0	6–1	1–1	—

Source: Liga BBVA MX
Legend: Blue = home team win; Yellow = draw; Red = away team win.

==== Noroeste Zone ====
===== League table =====
Pos	Team	Pld	W	D	L	GF	GA	GD	Pts	Qualification or relegation
1	Cachorros UANL	11	8	1	2	21	7	+14	25	Liguilla de Filiales
2	U.A. Tamaulipas	11	6	3	2	15	8	+7	24	Liguilla de Ascenso
3	Rayados 2a	11	7	1	3	26	8	+18	22	Liguilla de Filiales
4	Santos Laguna	11	6	2	3	16	13	+3	20	Liguilla de Filiales
5	Durango Vizcaya	11	6	1	4	22	18	+4	19	Liguilla de Ascenso
6	Indios	11	5	2	4	15	10	+5	18	Liguilla de Ascenso
7	Millonarios de La Joya	11	5	1	5	16	19	−3	17	
8	Tuzos UAZ	11	4	2	5	16	15	+1	15	
9	Real Saltillo Soccer	11	2	4	5	13	15	−2	13	
10	Deportivo Durango	11	2	4	5	15	17	−2	12	
11	Deportivo Guamúchil	11	2	3	6	17	29	−12	10	
12	Huracanes de Matamoros	11	1	0	10	8	41	−33	3	

Source: RSSSF

===== Results =====
Home \ Away	CNL	DUR	GUA	DVZ	HUR	IND	MLJ	RAY	RSS	SAN	UAT	UAZ
Cachorros UANL	—	1–0	—	4–1	—	0–1	—	—	3–0	—	—	0–0
Deportivo Durango	—	—	2–2	—	6–0	—	1–3	—	—	0–0	1–1	—
Deportivo Guamúchil	1–2	—	—	—	—	—	2–1	1–1	—	2–1	1–2	3–4
Durango Vizccaya	—	3–1	4–1	—	5–2	—	—	2–1	1–1	—	0–0	—
Huracanes Matamoros	0–2	—	4–1	—	—	—	1–2	—	—	0–2	0–4	—
Indios	—	0–2	6–1	2–1	0–0	—	—	1–2	2–1	—	—	—
Millonarios La Joya	0–3	—	—	1–3	—	0–0	—	—	—	2–4	—	3–0
Rayados 2a	2–1	4–0	—	—	4–0	—	1–2	—	2–0	7–0	—	—
Real Saltillo Soccer	—	1–1	2–2	—	5–0	—	1–1	—	—	—	2–0	—
Santos Laguna	0–1	—	—	4–1	—	1–0	—	—	2–0	—	—	2–0
U.A. Tamaulipas	2–4	—	—	—	—	0–0	3–0	1–0	—	0–0	—	1–0
Tuzos UAZ	—	2–1	—	0–1	8–1	1–1	—	0–2	1–0	—	—	—

Source: Liga BBVA MX
Legend: Blue = home team win; Yellow = draw; Red = away team win.

=== Liguilla ===
==== Liguilla de Ascenso ====
Quarter-finals
1	Garzas UAEH	1	1	2
8	América Coapa	1	0	1
5	Halcones VM (pen.)	1	3	4(7)
6	Indios	4	0	4(6)
4	Alto Rendimiento Tuzo	1	5	6
5	Durango Vizcaya	2	0	2
2	U.A. Tamaulipas	1	3	4
7	Tulancingo	1	1	2

Semi-finals
1	Garzas UAEH	2	3	5
5	Halcones VM	0	0	0
4	Alto Rendimiento Tuzo	1	4	5
2	U.A. Tamaulipas	3	0	3

Final
1	Garzas UAEH	1	2	3
4	Alto Rendimiento Tuzo	2	0	2

===== Quarter-finals =====
Team 1	Agg.	Team 2	1st leg	2nd leg
Garzas UAEH	2–1	América Coapa	1–1	1–0
Halcones VM (pen.)	(7–6); 4–4	Indios	1–4	3–0
Alto Rendimiento Tuzo	6–2	Durango Vizcaya	1–2	5–0
U.A. Tamaulipas	4–2	Tulancingo	1–1	3–1

====== First leg ======
19 November 2008	Durango Vizcaya	2–1	Alto Rendimiento Tuzo	Guadalupe Victoria
15:00	Franco 4'; Herrera 80'	Report	Arvizu 59'	Stadium: Estadio Municipal de Guadalupe Victoria; Attendance: 300; Referee: Osvaldo Hernández Cobos

19 November 2008	América Coapa	1–1	Garzas UAEH	Mexico City
15:00	Canales 85'	Report	González 19'	Stadium: Instalaciones Club América en Coapa; Attendance: 200; Referee: Humberto Sánchez Reyna

19 November 2008	Indios	4–1	Halcones VM	Ciudad Juárez
15:00	López 21', 65'; Salas 26'; Gámez 82'	Report	Bernal 16'	Stadium: Estadio Olímpico Benito Juárez; Attendance: 200; Referee: Félix Augusto López Carrillo

19 November 2008	Tulancingo	1–1	U.A. Tamaulipas	Tulancingo
15:00	Peralta 84'	Report	Vázquez 59'	Stadium: Estadio Primero de Mayo; Attendance: 500; Referee: Javier Moctezuma Nolasco

====== Second leg ======
22 November 2008	Alto Rendimiento Tuzo	5–0 (6–2 agg.)	Durango Vizcaya	Pachuca
12:00	Sánchez 14', 24', 47', 81'; Arvizu 15'	Report		Stadium: Estadio Hidalgo; Attendance: 200; Referee: Jaime Alberto Mendoza García

22 November 2008	Garzas UAEH	1–0 (2–1 agg.)	América Coapa	Pachuca
15:00	López 117'	Report		Stadium: Estadio Revolución Mexicana; Attendance: 200; Referee: Osvaldo Sánchez Huerta

22 November 2008	Halcones VM	3–0 (4–4 agg.) (7–6 p)	Indios	Tezontepec
15:00	Bernal 44'; Roque 68'; Paredes 80'	Report		Stadium: Estadio San Juan; Attendance: 200; Referee: Uriel Olvera Ríos

22 November 2008	U.A. Tamaulipas	3–1 (4–2 agg.)	Tulancingo	Ciudad Victoria
16:00	Ramírez 32'; Vázquez 67', 83'	Report	Peralta 14'	Stadium: Estadio Profesor Eugenio Alvizo Porras; Attendance: 150; Referee: Christian Jesús Avila Zarazúa

===== Semi-finals =====
Team 1	Agg.	Team 2	1st leg	2nd leg
Garzas UAEH	5–0	Halcones VM	2–0	3–0
Alto Rendimiento Tuzo	5–3	U.A. Tamaulipas	1–3	4–0

====== First leg ======
26 November 2008	Halcones VM	0–2	Garzas UAEH	Tezontepec
15:00		Report	Lira 1'; Trejo 81'	Stadium: Estadio San Juan; Attendance: 300; Referee: Baruch Absalón Castellanos

26 November 2008	U.A. Tamaulipas	3–1	Alto Rendimiento Tuzo	Ciudad Victoria
16:00	Ramírez 18'; Vázquez 28'; Domínguez 73'	Report	Villar 79'	Stadium: Estadio Profesor Eugenio Alvizo Porras; Attendance: 1,000; Referee: Héctor Alonso Medina González

====== Second leg ======
29 November 2008	Alto Rendimiento Tuzo	4–0 (5–3 agg.)	U.A. Tamaulipas	Pachuca
12:00	Castillo 3'; Sánchez 6', 12'; Arvizu 39'	Report		Stadium: Estadio Hidalgo; Attendance: 350; Referee: Arturo Cruz Hurtado

29 November 2008	Garzas UAEH	3–0 (5–0 agg.)	Halcones VM	Pachuca
14:00	López 28', 53'; Lira 43'	Report		Stadium: Estadio Revolución Mexicana; Attendance: 400; Referee: Arturo Serratos Alcaraz

===== Final =====
Team 1	Agg.	Team 2	1st leg	2nd leg
Garzas UAEH	3–2	Alto Rendimiento Tuzo	1–2	2–0

====== First leg ======
6 December 2008	Alto Rendimiento Tuzo	2–1	Garzas UAEH	Pachuca
12:00	Arvizu 26'; Sánchez 87'	Report	Lira 44'	Stadium: Estadio Hidalgo; Attendance: 5,000; Referee: Mauricio Martínez Figueroa

====== Second leg ======
13 December 2008	Garzas UAEH	2–0 (3–2 agg.)	Alto Rendimiento Tuzo	Pachuca
12:00	López 61'; González 76'	Report		Stadium: Estadio Hidalgo; Attendance: 5,000; Referee: Osvaldo Sánchez Huerta

Apertura 2008 winners

1st title

==== Liguilla de Filiales ====
===== Group 1 =====
Pos	Team	Pld	W	D	L	GF	GA	GD	Pts	Promotion	SAN	CNL	PUM	GUA
1	Santos Laguna	6	2	4	0	2	0	+2	10	Filiales Final		0–0	0–0	1–0
2	Cachorros UANL	6	2	2	2	7	8	−1	10		0–0		3–2	2–0
3	Pumas Prepa	6	2	2	2	7	6	+1	9		0–1	2–0		1–0
4	Guadalajara	6	1	2	3	6	8	−2	8		0–0	4–2	2–2	

Source: RSSSF
Legend: Blue = home team win; Yellow = draw; Red = away team win.
Rules for classification: 1st points; 2nd head-to-head points; 3rd head-to-head goal difference; 4th head-to-head goals scored; 5th goal difference; 6th number of goals scored

===== Group 2 =====
Pos	Team	Pld	W	D	L	GF	GA	GD	Pts	Promotion	ATL	TOL	RAY	LOB
1	Atlas	6	5	1	0	13	0	+13	16	Filiales Final		4–0	2–0	4–0
2	Toluca	6	2	2	2	6	9	−3	10		0–0		1–1	2–1
3	Rayados 2a	6	2	1	3	7	6	+1	7		0–1	2–1		4–0
4	Lobos Prepa	6	1	0	5	3	14	−11	3		0–2	1–2	1–0	

Source: RSSSF
Legend: Blue = home team win; Yellow = draw; Red = away team win.
Rules for classification: 1st points; 2nd head-to-head points; 3rd head-to-head goal difference; 4th head-to-head goals scored; 5th goal difference; 6th number of goals scored

===== Final =====
Team 1	Agg.	Team 2	1st leg	2nd leg
Atlas	2–1	Santos Laguna	1–1	1–0

====== First leg ======
10 December 2008	Santos Laguna	1–1	Atlas	Gómez Palacio
15:30	Enríquez 44'	Report	Ramos 88'	Stadium: Estadio Santa Rita; Attendance: 200; Referee: Marco Antonio Ortíz Nava

====== Second leg ======
13 December 2008	Atlas	1–0 (2–1 agg.)	Santos Laguna	Zapopan
12:00	Santos 88'	Report		Stadium: Club Atlas Chapalita; Attendance: 200; Referee: Víctor Bisguerra Mendiola

Apertura 2008 Filiales winners

1st title

== Torneo Clausura ==
=== Regular season ===
==== Sureste Zone ====
===== League table =====
Pos	Team	Pld	W	D	L	GF	GA	GD	Pts	Qualification or relegation
1	Cuautla	9	6	2	1	10	7	+3	21	Liguilla de Ascenso
2	Lobos Prepa	9	6	2	1	26	12	+14	20	Liguilla de Filiales
3	Alebrijes de Oaxaca	9	4	2	3	21	15	+6	16	Liguilla de Ascenso
4	Puebla	9	3	4	2	20	16	+4	16	Liguilla de Filiales
5	Titanes de Tulancingo	9	4	3	2	12	10	+2	16	Liguilla de Ascenso
6	Deportivo Contreras	9	4	1	4	16	16	0	14	
7	Garzas UAEH	9	3	2	4	9	9	0	13	
8	Halcones del Valle del Mezquital	9	3	2	4	18	17	+1	11	
9	Inter Tehuacán	9	1	2	6	7	20	−13	5	
10	Gallos Blancos de Izcalli	9	0	2	7	7	24	−17	3	

Source: RSSSF

===== Results =====
Home \ Away	ALE	CUA	CON	GBL	HVM	INT	LOB	PUE	TUL	UEH
Alebrijes de Oaxaca	—	—	4–1	5–1	4–3	—	0–1	2–2	2–2	—
Cuautla	2–1	—	—	—	—	1–0	1–1	—	1–0	2–1
Dep. Contreras	—	3–0	—	—	—	—	2–3	3–2	—	—
Gallos Blancos de Izcalli	—	0–1	1–1	—	—	—	2–6	2–5	0–2	—
Halcones VM	—	0–1	3–1	1–0	—	—	—	3–3	0–0	—
Inter Tehuacán	1–2	—	1–3	1–1	0–4	—	—	—	—	1–0
Lobos Prepa	—	—	—	—	3–0	6–1	—	—	4–2	0–0
Puebla	—	1–1	—	—	—	3–1	3–2	—	—	—
Tulancingo	—	—	2–1	—	—	0–0	—	0–0	—	1–0
Garzas UAEH	2–1	—	0–1	2–0	2–2	—	—	2–1	—	—

Source: Liga BBVA MX
Legend: Blue = home team win; Yellow = draw; Red = away team win.

==== Bajío Zone ====
===== League table =====
Pos	Team	Pld	W	D	L	GF	GA	GD	Pts	Qualification or relegation
1	Atlas	10	7	1	2	23	9	+14	22	Liguilla de Filiales
2	Guadalajara	10	6	2	2	23	12	+11	20	Liguilla de Filiales
3	América Coapa	10	6	1	3	20	11	+9	20	Liguilla de Ascenso
4	Monarcas Morelia	10	6	1	3	22	18	+4	19	Liguilla de Filiales
5	Cadereyta	10	6	1	3	20	20	0	19	Liguilla de Ascenso
6	Atlético Cihuatlán	10	3	3	4	17	15	+2	14	
7	Alto Rendimiento Tuzo	10	3	2	5	14	23	−9	13	
8	Pumas Prepa	10	3	2	5	13	14	−1	12	
9	Chivas San Rafael	10	3	0	7	10	16	−6	9	
10	Oro	10	2	2	6	4	21	−17	9	
11	Toluca	10	2	1	7	13	20	−7	8	

Source: RSSSF

===== Results =====
Home \ Away	ART	AME	ATL	CIH	CAD	CHI	GUA	MON	ORO	PUM	TOL
Alto Rendimiento Tuzo	—	—	1–4	—	4–0	2–1	1–3	—	0–0	—	—
América	2–1	—	—	3–0	—	—	—	2–0	3–1	1–2	3–0
Atlas	—	2–0	—	2–2	—	2–0	—	4–2	—	—	—
Atlético Cihuatlán	1–2	—	—	—	6–3	—	1–1	—	—	2–0	4–1
Cadereyta	—	3–2	2–1	—	—	1–0	—	2–3	3–0	—	—
Chivas San Rafael	—	1–2	—	1–0	—	—	—	1–2	—	1–0	—
Guadalajara	—	2–2	0–1	—	1–2	4–2	—	—	2–0	—	—
Monarcas Morelia	6–2	—	—	2–1	—	—	1–4	—	3–0	2–1	1–1
Oro	—	—	0–5	0–0	—	1–0	—	—	—	1–5	1–0
Pumas Prepa	1–1	—	0–1	—	1–1	—	2–4	—	—	—	1–0
Toluca	5–1	—	2–1	—	2–3	2–3	0–2	—	—	—	—

Source: Liga BBVA MX
Legend: Blue = home team win; Yellow = draw; Red = away team win.

==== Noroeste Zone ====
===== League table =====
Pos	Team	Pld	W	D	L	GF	GA	GD	Pts	Qualification or relegation
1	Santos Laguna	11	6	4	1	26	13	+13	24	Liguilla de Filiales
2	U.A. Tamaulipas	11	6	2	3	23	10	+13	22	Liguilla de Ascenso
3	Deportivo Durango	11	7	1	3	24	17	+7	22	Liguilla de Ascenso
4	Cachorros UANL	11	5	4	2	20	14	+6	21	Liguilla de Filiales
5	Real Saltillo Soccer	11	4	5	2	14	11	+3	21	Liguilla de Ascenso
6	Rayados 2a	10	6	1	3	25	13	+12	19	Liguilla de Filiales
7	Deportivo Guamúchil	11	4	3	4	16	16	0	16	
8	Indios	11	2	6	3	12	14	−2	15	
9	Durango Vizcaya	11	3	3	5	15	21	−6	15	
10	Tuzos UAZ	11	2	4	5	21	23	−2	10	
11	Millonarios de La Joya	11	2	1	8	14	40	−26	7	
12	Huracanes de Matamoros	10	0	2	8	4	22	−18	3	

Source: RSSSF

===== Results =====
Home \ Away	CNL	DUR	GUA	DVZ	HUR	IND	MLJ	RAY	RSS	SAN	UAT	UAZ
Cachorros UANL	—	—	1–3	—	—	—	2–0	2–2	—	2–2	2–1	—
Deportivo Durango	3–1	—	—	3–2	—	4–1	—	0–1	2–2	—	—	4–2
Deportivo Guamúchil	—	2–0	—	0–0	0–0	1–1	—	—	1–1	—	—	—
Durango Vizccaya	1–4	—	—	—	—	0–0	5–2	—	—	1–3	—	0–0
Huracanes Matamoros	0–2	1–2	—	1–2	—	0–3	—	—	0–0	—	—	1–1
Indios	0–2	—	—	—	—	—	2–2	—	—	1–1	0–0	2–1
Millonarios La Joya	—	0–3	0–3	—	3–1	—	—	2–5	2–1	—	1–5	—
Rayados 2a	—	—	3–2	5–0	2–0	2–1	—	—	—	—	0–1	6–2
Real Saltillo Soccer	0–0	—	—	2–1	—	1–1	—	2–1	—	1–2	—	3–1
Santos Laguna	—	1–3	5–2	—	3–0	—	5–0	1–0	—	—	2–2	—
U.A. Tamaulipas	—	4–0	3–0	1–3	0–0	—	—	—	0–1	—	—	—
Tuzos UAZ	2–2	—	2–0	—	—	—	8–2	—	—	1–1	1–2	—

Source: Liga BBVA MX
Legend: Blue = home team win; Yellow = draw; Red = away team win.

=== Liguilla ===
==== Liguilla de Ascenso ====
Quarter-finals
1	U.A. Tamaulipas	3	2	5
7	Alebrijes de Oaxaca	1	2	3
3	Cuautla	0	1	1
8	Tulancingo	0	2	2
5	América Coapa	1	7	8
4	Real Saltillo Soccer	1	1	2
2	Deportivo Durango	0	5	5
6	Cadereyta	5	3	8

Semi-finals
1	U.A. Tamaulipas	2	0	2
8	Tulancingo	1	0	1
5	América Coapa	1	1	2
6	Cadereyta	0	1	1

Final
1	U.A. Tamaulipas	2	1	3 (5)
5	América Coapa (pen.)	3	0	3 (6)

===== Quarter-finals =====
Team 1	Agg.	Team 2	1st leg	2nd leg
U.A. Tamaulipas	5–3	Alebrijes de Oaxaca	3–1	2–2
Cuautla	1–2	Tulancingo	0–0	1–2
América Coapa	8–2	Real Saltillo Soccer	1–1	7–1
Deportivo Durango	5–8	Cadereyta	0–5	5–3

====== First leg ======
22 April 2009	Tulancingo	0–0	Cuautla	Tulancingo
16:00		Report		Stadium: Estadio Primero de Mayo; Attendance: 1,200; Referee: Eduardo Galván Basulto

22 April 2009	Real Saltillo Soccer	1–1	América Coapa	Saltillo
17:30	Espino 84'	Report	Iturbide 32'	Stadium: Estadio Olímpico Francisco I. Madero; Attendance: 2,000; Referee: Rogelio Iván Rodríguez López

23 April 2009	Alebrijes de Oaxaca	1–3	U.A. Tamaulipas	Oaxaca City
15:00	Campuzano 15'	Report	Vázquez 30', 64'; Molina 68'	Stadium: Estadio General Manuel Cabrera Carrasquedo; Attendance: 250; Referee: Mauricio Martínez Figueroa

23 April 2009	Cadereyta	5–0	Deportivo Durango	Cadereyta de Montes
17:00	Ríos 1', 10', 25', 50', 68'	Report		Stadium: Estadio Cadereyta; Attendance: 1,700; Referee: Roberto Gutiérrez Soto

====== Second leg ======
25 April 2009	América Coapa	7–1 (8–2 agg.)	Real Saltillo Soccer	Mexico City
15:00	Jiménez 15', 52', 84'; Iturbide 32', 60'; Gallardo 66'; Olascoaga 89'	Report	Espino 6'	Stadium: Instalaciones Club América en Coapa; Attendance: 0 Referee: Jorge Alberto Díaz González

25 April 2009	Cuautla	1–2 (1–2 agg.)	Tulancingo	Cuautla
16:00	Meráz 26'	Report	Arenas 44'; Pineda 47'	Stadium: Estadio Isidro Gil Tapia; Attendance: 2,000; Referee: Ángel Monroy Bello

26 April 2009	U.A. Tamaulipas	2–2 (5–3 agg.)	Alebrijes de Oaxaca	Ciudad Victoria
11:00	Vázquez 47', 84'	Report	Campuzano 7', 52'	Stadium: Estadio Profesor Eugenio Alvizo Porras; Attendance: 90; Referee: Miguel Ángel Garza García

26 April 2009	Deportivo Durango	5–3 (5–8 agg.)	Cadereyta	Durango City
12:00	Reyes 54', 68'; Silva 66', 71'; Hernández 85'	Report	Fraile 30'; Roldán 73'; Ríos 86'	Stadium: Estadio Francisco Zarco; Attendance: 150; Referee: Marcos Adrián Aguilar Montes de Oca

===== Semi-finals =====
Team 1	Agg.	Team 2	1st leg	2nd leg
U.A. Tamaulipas	2–1	Tulancingo	2–1	0–0
América Coapa	2–1	Cadereyta	1–0	1–1

====== First leg ======
29 April 2009	Cadereyta	0–1	América Coapa	Cadereyta de Montes
17:00		Report	Iturbide 64'	Stadium: Estadio Cadereyta; Attendance: 0 Referee: Jesús Bisguerra Mendiola

30 April 2009	Tulancingo	1–2	U.A. Tamaulipas	Tulancingo
16:00	Hernández 44'	Report	Barrientos 10'; González 27'	Stadium: Estadio Primero de Mayo; Attendance: 0 Referee: Reinhold Enrique Ortíz Tienda

====== Second leg ======
2 May 2009	América Coapa	1–1 (2–1 agg.)	Cadereyta	Mexico City
15:00	Iturbide 8'	Report	Torres 59'	Stadium: Instalaciones Club América en Coapa; Attendance: 0 Referee: Baruch Absalón Castellanos

3 May 2009	U.A. Tamaulipas	0–0 (2–1 agg.)	Tulancingo	Ciudad Victoria
11:00		Report		Stadium: Estadio Profesor Eugenio Alvizo Porras; Attendance: 0 Referee: Moisés González González

===== Final =====
Team 1	Agg.	Team 2	1st leg	2nd leg
U.A. Tamaulipas	3–3 (5–6)	(pen.) América Coapa	2–3	1–0

====== First leg ======
9 May 2009	América Coapa	3–2	U.A. Tamaulipas	Mexico City
15:00	León y Vélez 2'; Ortega 19'; Iturbe 86'	Report	Vázquez 45'; Valencia 48'	Stadium: Instalaciones Club América en Coapa; Attendance: 300; Referee: Mauricio Martínez Figueroa

====== Second leg ======
17 May 2009	U.A. Tamaulipas	1–0 (3–3 agg.) (5–6 p)	América Coapa	Ciudad Victoria
11:00	Vázquez 89'	Report		Stadium: Estadio Profesor Eugenio Alvizo Porras; Attendance: 4,000; Referee: Roberto Montañez De León

Clausura 2009 winners

1st title

==== Liguilla de Filiales ====
===== Group 1 =====
Pos	Team	Pld	W	D	L	GF	GA	GD	Pts	Promotion	SAN	LOB	CNL	PUE
1	Santos Laguna	6	4	1	1	18	10	+8	14	Filiales Final		1–2	5–2	3–1
2	Lobos Prepa	6	4	0	2	11	12	−1	12		2–5		2–1	1–0
3	Cachorros UANL	6	2	1	3	20	14	+6	7		1–2	3–1		9–0
4	Puebla	6	0	2	4	9	22	−13	3		2–2	2–3	4–4	

Source: RSSSF
Legend: Blue = home team win; Yellow = draw; Red = away team win.
Rules for classification: 1st points; 2nd head-to-head points; 3rd head-to-head goal difference; 4th head-to-head goals scored; 5th goal difference; 6th number of goals scored

===== Group 2 =====
Pos	Team	Pld	W	D	L	GF	GA	GD	Pts	Promotion	GUA	ATL	MON	RAY
1	Guadalajara	6	3	2	1	12	8	+4	13	Filiales Final		1–0	2–1	1–1
2	Atlas	6	3	0	3	8	9	−1	9		3–2		2–1	1–0
3	Monarcas Morelia	6	2	1	3	12	10	+2	7		3–3	4–1		3–0
4	Rayados 2a	6	2	1	3	5	10	−5	7		0–3	2–1	2–0	

Source: RSSSF
Legend: Blue = home team win; Yellow = draw; Red = away team win.
Rules for classification: 1st points; 2nd head-to-head points; 3rd head-to-head goal difference; 4th head-to-head goals scored; 5th goal difference; 6th number of goals scored

===== Final =====
Team 1	Agg.	Team 2	1st leg	2nd leg
Santos Laguna	3–3 (2–4)	(pen.) Guadalajara	2–0	1–3

====== First leg ======
13 May 2009	Guadalajara	0–2	Santos Laguna	Zapopan
12:00	Martínez 44'; Esqueda 89'	Report		Stadium: Instalaciones de Verde Valle; Attendance: 300; Referee: Antonio de Jesús Olalde Vázquez

====== Second leg ======
16 May 2009	Santos Laguna	1–3 (3–3 agg.) (2–4 p)	Guadalajara	Gómez Palacio
15:00	Parra 21'	Report	Sandoval 10'; Vázquez 77', 88'	Stadium: Estadio Santa Rita; Attendance: 1,000; Referee: Saúl Fernando Orozco Nájera

Clausura 2009 Filiales winners

1st title

== Relegation Table ==
P	Team	Pts	G	Pts/G	
1	Atlas	49	20	2.450	
2	Guadalajara	47	20	2.350	
3	Garzas UAEH	40	19	2.105	
4	U.A. Tamaulipas	46	22	2.090	
5	Cachorros UANL	46	22	2.090	
6	Lobos Prepa	39	19	2.052	
7	Puebla	39	19	2.052	
8	Santos Laguna	44	22	2.000	
9	Rayados 2a	43	22	1.863	
10	América Coapa	36	20	1.800	
11	Alto Rendimiento Tuzo	36	20	1.800	
12	Titanes de Tulancingo	32	19	1.684	
13	Durango Vizcaya	35	22	1.590	
14	Deportivo Durango	34	22	1.545	
15	Real Saltillo Soccer	34	22	1.545	
16	Cuautla	29	19	1.526	
17	Halcones del Valle del Mezquital	29	19	1.526	
18	Indios	33	22	1.500	
19	Pumas Prepa	30	20	1.500	
20	Alebrijes de Oaxaca	26	19	1.368	
21	Toluca	26	20	1.300	
22	Monarcas Morelia	25	20	1.250	
23	Deportivo Contreras	23	19	1.210	
24	Atlético Cihuatlán	24	20	1.200	
25	Deportivo Guamúchil	26	22	1.181	
26	Cadereyta	23	20	1.150	
27	Tuzos UAZ	25	22	1.136	
28	Chivas San Rafael	22	20	1.100	
29	Millonarios de La Joya	24	22	1.090	
30	Oro	12	20	0.600	
31	Inter Tehuacán	15	19	0.789	
32	Gallos Blancos de Izcalli	15	19	0.789	
33	Huracanes de Matamoros	6	22	0.272	
34	Atlante Tabasco	x	x	0.000	Withdrew
35	Mapaches de Nueva Italia	x	x	0.000	Disaffiliated

Last updated: 18 April 2009
Source: Liga Premier FMF
P = Position; G = Games played; Pts = Points; Pts/G = Ratio of points to games played

== Promotion Final ==
The Final de Ascenso de la Liga de Nuevos Talentos 2009 was the promotion final between the champions of the Apertura 2008 and Clausura 2009 tournaments to determine the club promoted to Liga Premier de Ascenso. The first leg was played on 20 May 2009, and the second leg was played on 23 May 2009.

Team 1	Agg.	Team 2	1st leg	2nd leg
Garzas UAEH	0–0 (8–9)	(pen.) América Coapa	0–0	0–0

=== First leg ===
20 May 2009	América Coapa	0–0	Garzas UAEH	Mexico City
15:00		Report		Stadium: Instalaciones Club América en Coapa; Attendance: 500; Referee: León Vicente Barajas Anzures

=== Second leg ===
23 May 2009	Garzas UAEH	0–0 (0–0 agg.) (8–9 p)	América Coapa	Pachuca
16:00		Report		Stadium: Estadio Revolución Mexicana; Attendance: 2,000; Referee: Baruch Absalón Castellanos

2008–09 winners

1st title

== See also ==
- Primera División de México Apertura 2008
- Primera División de México Clausura 2009
- 2008–09 Primera División A season
- 2008–09 Liga Premier de Ascenso season
