= Club América (disambiguation) =

Club América is a Mexican football club. It may also refer to:

- Club América (women), the women's section of the above football club
- Club América Premier, a Mexican football club competing in the Mexican third division.
