= Josué Bustos =

Mexican footballer (born 1992)

Personal information
- Full name: Josué de Jesús Bustos Ortíz
- Date of birth: 15 November 1992 (age 33)
- Place of birth: Poza Rica, Veracruz, Mexico
- Height: 1.77 m (5 ft 10 in)
- Position: Forward

Senior career*
Years	Team	Apps	(Gls)
2007–2010	Poza Rica	65	(25)
2010–2013	UAEH	90	(64)
2013–2014	Selva Cañera	23	(19)
2014–2017	Zacatepec	29	(2)
2016–2017	→ Athletic Club Morelos (loan)	31	(11)
2017	→ Halcones de Morelos (loan)	12	(4)
2018–2019	Gavilanes de Matamoros	40	(25)
2019–2020	Coras Nayarit	13	(2)
2020	Club Veracruzano de Fútbol Tiburón	0	(0)
- * Club domestic league appearances and goals as of 19 August 2019

Josué de Jesús Bustos Ortiz (born November 15, 1992) is a professional Mexican footballer who currently plays for Coras de Nayarit F.C. He is nicknamed "El Pez" (The Fish). National Champion with "Zacatepec 1948" team (Segunda División Liga de Nuevos Talentos, Torneo Clausura 2014).
