= Jesús Alexandré González =

American soccer player

Jesús Alexandre González Emerson (born February 26, 1992, in San Jose, California), known as Alex González Emerson, is an American professional soccer player who plays as a forward for C.D. Tepatitlán de Morelos.
