= Luis Rodríguez (footballer, born October 1994) =

Mexican footballer (born 1994)

Personal information
- Full name: Luis Alfonso Rodríguez Mata
- Date of birth: 14 October 1994 (age 32)
- Place of birth: Guadalajara, Jalisco, Mexico
- Height: 1.68 m (5 ft 6 in)
- Position: Midfielder

Team information
- Current team: Chiapas

Youth career
- 2010–2014: Atlas

Senior career*
Years	Team	Apps	(Gls)
2014–2017	Atlas II	39	(5)
2015	→ Altamira (loan)	4	(1)
2017–2020	Tepatitlán de Morelos	41	(9)
2018–2019	→ Real Zamora (loan)	23	(2)
2020	Jaguares de Jalisco	0	(0)
2021–2022	Chiapas	13	(2)
2023–	Chiapas	0	(0)
- * Club domestic league appearances and goals as of 15:59, 25 January 2020 (UTC)

Luis Alfonso Rodríguez Mata (born October 14, 1994) is a professional Mexican footballer who currently plays for Tepatitlán de Morelos.
