= Deportivo San Juan =

Mexican football club

San Juan
- Full name: Deportivo San Juan
- Founded: 2013; 12 years ago
- Dissolved: 2017; 8 years ago
- Ground: Unidad Deportiva Mazamitla, Mazamitla, Jalisco, Mexico
- Capacity: 1,000
- Chairman: José Alberto Jesús Porrero
- Manager: José Antulio Padilla
- League: Liga Premier - Serie B
- Apertura 2017: Preseason

The Deportivo San Juan, commonly known as San Juan, was a Mexican football club based in Mazamitla. The club was founded in 2013.
