= Cañoneros de Campeche =

Mexican football club

Cañoneros
- Full name: Cañoneros de Campeche Futbol Club
- Founded: 2011
- Ground: Estadio Universitario de Campeche, Campeche, Mexico
- Capacity: 3,000
- Chairman: (Mexico) C.P. Alberto Chan Talango
- Manager: (Mexico) Francisco Javier Payas Loida
- League: Segunda División de México
Home colours	Away colours	Third colours

Cañoneros de Campeche is a Mexican football club based in Campeche, Mexico, Mexico. The club was founded in 2011 and plays in the Liga Premier of the Segunda División de México

== Current squad ==
Note: Flags indicate national team as defined under FIFA eligibility rules; some limited exceptions apply. Players may hold more than one non-FIFA nationality.

No.	Pos.	Nation	Player
1	GK	MEX	Carlos Delgado
2	DF	MEX	José Miguel Ávila
3	DF	MEX	Guillermo Montiel
4	DF	MEX	José Dzul
5	MF	MEX	José Felipe Uc
6	MF	MEX	Marcos Montes de Oca
7	MF	MEX	William Herrera
8	MF	MEX	Daniel Delgadillo
9	FW	MEX	Christian Sotomayor
10	FW	MEX	Gerardo Carrera
11	FW	MEX	Manuel Castillo

No.	Pos.	Nation	Player
12	GK	MEX	Alberto Fierros
13	DF	MEX	Irvin Brown
14	FW	MEX	Dayvelis García
15	DF	MEX	Donaldo Escalante
16	DF	MEX	Diego Hernández
17	DF	MEX	Erick Flores
18	FW	MEX	Aldo Becerra
19	MF	MEX	Alejandro Herrera
20	FW	MEX	Manuel Baas
21	MF	MEX	José Cervera
22	FW	MEX	Omar Pérez
