= Alfareros de Tonalá S.C. =

Mexican football team

Alfareros de Tonala
- Full name: Alfareros de Tonala S.C.
- Nickname: Alfareros
- Ground: Estadio Revolucion MexicanaTonala, Jalisco
- Capacity: 5,000
- Chairman: (Mexico) José de Jesús Sierra Zamora
- Manager: (Mexico) Jorge Enrique Medina
- League: Segunda División de México
Home colours	Away colours

Alfareros de Tonalá was a Mexican football team which was be a part of the inaugural year of the Liga de Ascenso. The team resided in Tonala, Jalisco. The club does not exist anymore

== Current roster ==
- Updated on August 29, 2011.

Note: Flags indicate national team as defined under FIFA eligibility rules; some limited exceptions apply. Players may hold more than one non-FIFA nationality.

No.	Pos.	Nation	Player
1	GK	MEX	Gomar Munguía Roberto
2	DF	MEX	Luis Jorge Villavicienio
3	DF	MEX	Monrreal Rosas Antonio Miguel
4	DF	MEX	César Michel Valerio
5	MF	MEX	Cristopher Hernández Ortega
6	MF	MEX	Rangel Dávila Martín
7	MF	MEX	Roberto Zambrano
8	MF	MEX	Castellanos Diego Armando
10	MF	MEX	Luis Antonio Lopes
11	FW	MEX	Barragán Ángel Eduardo
12	FW	MEX	Gerardo Villalobos

No.	Pos.	Nation	Player
13	DF	MEX	Padilla José Isidro
14	FW	MEX	Ornelas Miguel Alejandro
15	MF	MEX	Javier de Jesús
16	MF	MEX	Angulo Carlos Eduardo
17	MF	MEX	Francisco Javier Garcia
18	FW	MEX	Oscar René Sanches
19	FW	MEX	Sául Antonio Csillas
27	MF	MEX	Alfredo Barbosa
26	GK	MEX	Omar Zaragoza
41	GK	MEX	Iván Sánchez
