= Manuel Gómez Mora =

Mexican footballer (born 1990)

Manuel Gómez Mora (born 16 August 1990 in Guadalajara) is a Mexican professional footballer who plays for Inter Playa del Carmen.
