= Reyes de Texcoco =

- Full name: Reyes Campesinos de Texcoco
- Nickname(s): Campesinos
- Founded: 2011
- Ground: Estadio Claudio Suarez; Texcoco, State of Mexico
- Capacity: 5,000
- Chairman: (Mexico) Mauricio Ruíz Sánchez
- Manager: (Mexico) Nahum Zavaleta
- League: Segunda División de México
Home colours	Away colours

Reyes de Texcoco is a Mexican football club, They reside in Texcoco, State of Mexico. The club currently places in the Segunda División de México and would not be eligible for promotion, since the club does not count with a stadium with a capacity of 15,000.

== Current roster ==
- Updated on August 29, 2011.

Note: Flags indicate national team as defined under FIFA eligibility rules; some limited exceptions apply. Players may hold more than one non-FIFA nationality.

No.	Pos.	Nation	Player
1	GK	(Mexico) MEX	Loreto Ulises Batista
2	DF	(Mexico) MEX	José Luis Barajas
3	DF	(Mexico) MEX	Christian Benjamín Galindo
4	MF	(Mexico) MEX	Alejandro Vega
5	MF	(Mexico) MEX	Víctor Alejandro Chavez
6	MF	(Mexico) MEX	Jovanni Sierra
7	MF	(Mexico) MEX	Felipe Daniel Galacia
8	MF	(Mexico) MEX	Gustavo Alberto Bermeo
9	DF	(Mexico) MEX	Martín Zuniga

No.	Pos.	Nation	Player
10	MF	(Mexico) MEX	Luis Ángel Alvares
11	FW	(Mexico) MEX	Irwin Alexis Castanon
12	FW	(Mexico) MEX	Juan Francisco Silva
12	DF	(Mexico) MEX	Juan Francisco Silva
14	FW	(Mexico) MEX	Rey Uriel Batista
15	MF	(Mexico) MEX	Edgar Aarón Chavez
16	MF	(Mexico) MEX	Isaac Antonio Cordova
17	MF	(Mexico) MEX	Jorge Omar Ortega
18	FW	(Mexico) MEX	Alan Angelo Becera
