= Carlos Cauich =

Mexican footballer (born 1991)

Personal information
- Full name: Carlos Omar Cauich Castro
- Date of birth: 13 May 1986 (age 40)
- Place of birth: Benito Juárez, Mexico
- Height: 1.71 m (5 ft 7 in)
- Position: Forward

Senior career*
Years	Team	Apps	(Gls)
2015–2017	Atlante	77	(13)
2017–2018	Alebrijes	10	(1)
Total		87	(14)
- * Club domestic league appearances and goals

Carlos Omar Cauich Castro (born May 13, 1992, in Benito Juárez, Quintana Roo) is a Mexican professional footballer who last played for Alebrijes de Oaxaca.
