= Alto Rendimiento Tuzo =

A.R.T
- Full name: Alto Rendimiento Tuzo
- Nickname(s): Tuzos
- Founded: 1993
- Dissolved: 2015
- Ground: Estadio Universidad de Futbol Cancha 1 San Agustín Tlaxiaca, Hidalgo
- Capacity: 1,000
- Chairman: Jesús Martínez Patiño
- League: Segunda División de México
- Clausura 2015: Started Friday
Home colours	Away colours

Alto Rendimiento Tuzo was a Mexican football club in Pachuca, Hidalgo, was placed in the Segunda División de México Liga Nuevos Talentos. The club was not eligible for promotion because it is affiliated with Mexican Liga Bancomer MX club C.F. Pachuca with whom they share the same stadium for training.

== Honors ==
- Segunda División de México (1) : Apertura 2008
