= C.D. Guadalajara Premier =

Guadalajara Premier
- Full name: Club Deportivo Guadalajara Premier
- Nicknames: Las Chivas (The Goats); Las Chivas Rayadas (The Striped Goats); El Rebaño Sagrado (The Sacred Herd); Los Rojiblancos (The Red-and-Whites)
- Founded: 14 July 2015; 10 years ago
- Dissolved: 15 May 2019; 6 years ago
- Ground: Verde Valle; Zapopan, Jalisco
- Capacity: 800
- Owner: Grupo Omnilife
- Chairman: José Luis Higuera
- League: Liga Premier - Serie A
- Clausura 2018: 9th
Home colours	Away colours

Club Deportivo Guadalajara Premier was a Mexican football club based in Guadalajara, Jalisco that played in the Liga Premier - Serie A of the Segunda División de México, the third division level of Mexican football, and was the official reserve team for Guadalajara. The games were held in Zapopan in the Verde Valle training fields. It replaced C.D. Tapatío as the official reserve team in 2009 under the name Chivas Rayadas. On July 14, 2015, it was renamed as Guadalajara Premier. The roster was composed of the club's talented youth academy players, some of which outgrew the age of 20 years. The team was dissolved on May 15, 2019 with all players leaving the team.

== Current squad ==
As of 24 August 2018

Note: Flags indicate national team as defined under FIFA eligibility rules; some limited exceptions apply. Players may hold more than one non-FIFA nationality.

No. / Pos. / Nation / Player	No. / Pos. / Nation / Player

== Honors ==
- Liga Premier de Ascenso de México (1): Revolución 2011.
- Copa de la Segunda División de México (3): 1995-96, Apertura 2013, Clausura 2014.
- Campeón de Campeones: 2014.
- Tercera División de México: 1993-94
