= Club Universidad Nacional Premier =

Mexican football club

UNAM Premier
- Full name: Club Universidad Nacional A. C. Premier
- Nicknames: Los Pumas (The Cougars); La Universidad (The University); Los Felinos (The Felines); Azul y Oro (The Gold-and-Blues); Los Universitarios (The College Ones); La Banda del Pedregal (The Pedregal Gang)
- Founded: 14 July 2015; 10 years ago
- Dissolved: 24 June 2020; 5 years ago
- Ground: La Cantera; Coyoacán, Mexico City
- Capacity: 2,000
- Owner: UNAM
- Chairman: Leopoldo Silva Gutiérrez
- League: Liga Premier - Serie A
- 2019–20: 5th, Group II (Tournament abandoned)
- Website: http://clubpumasunam.com/
Home colours	Away colours

Club Universidad Nacional A.C. Premier was a professional football team that played in the Mexican Football League. They were playing in the Liga Premier (Mexico's Third Division). Club Universidad Nacional A.C. Premier was affiliated with Club Universidad Nacional who plays in the Liga MX. The games were held in the Mexico City neighborhood of Coyoacán in the Estadio La Cantera. In June 2020, this team was discontinued due to the creation of Pumas Tabasco, a team that plays in the Liga de Expansión MX and which was made up of UNAM Premier players.

== Players ==
=== Current squad ===
As of January 31, 2020

Note: Flags indicate national team as defined under FIFA eligibility rules; some limited exceptions apply. Players may hold more than one non-FIFA nationality.

No.	Pos.	Nation	Player
