= Lobos BUAP Premier =

Mexican football club

- Full name: Club de Fútbol Lobos de la Benemérita Universidad Autónoma de Puebla Premier
- Nickname(s): Los Lobos (The Wolves); La Prepa (The High School)
- Founded: 12 August 2017; 7 years ago
- Dissolved: 2018; 7 years ago
- Ground: CEFOR Lobos BUAP; Puebla City, Puebla, Mexico
- Capacity: 1,000
- Owner: BUAP
- Chairman: Juan Carlos Bozikián
- League: Liga Premier - Serie A
- Apertura 2017: Preseason
Home colours	Away colours

Club de Fútbol Lobos de la Benemérita Universidad Autónoma de Puebla Premier were a Mexican football club based in Puebla, Mexico. The club represented the Autonomous University of Puebla. The clubs was affiliated with Lobos BUAP and plays in the Liga Premier.
