= Estadio Universitario de Campeche =

Multi-use stadium in Campeche City

Coordinates: 19°49′47″N 90°33′16″W

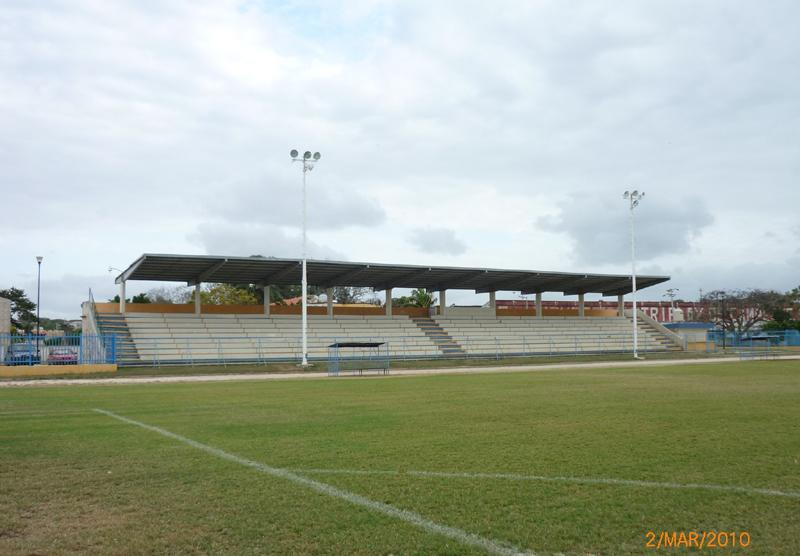
Estadio Universitario.jpg

The Universitario de Campeche is a multi-use stadium in Campeche City. It is currently used mostly for football matches and is the home stadium for Corsarios de Campeche The stadium has a capacity of 4,000 people.
