= Académicos de Atlas =

Mexican football club

Académicos
- Full name: Académicos de Atlas
- Nicknames: Los Zorros (The Foxes); Los Rojinegros (The Red-blacks); La Academia (The Academy)
- Founded: 2000
- Dissolved: 2016
- Ground: CECAF, Pénjamo, Guanajuato, Mexico
- Capacity: 1,000
| Home colours | Away colours |

Académicos de Atlas was a reserve team of Atlas, in 2005–06 season known as Coyotes de Sonora.

== History ==
In 2004–05 Segunda División de México season, Académicos won the opening and closing champion of group Liguilla de Ascenso and promoted to Ascenso MX.

The club was renamed to Coyotes and re-located to Hermosillo, Sonora, but remained as part of Atlas. After a season, the club changed the name back to Académicos.

In 2007–08 season, the club was based in Tonalá, Jalisco and in 2008–09 season, in Guadalajara. After the reconstruction of Primera División A, the team folded, but Atlas still had teams played from the 7th division to 2nd division.

== Honours ==
- Segunda División de México: 2

Apertura 2004, Clausura 2005

- Tercera División de México: 2

1997–98, Apertura 2001
