= Club América Premier =

Mexican football club

América Premier
- Full name: Club de Fútbol América S.A. de C.V. Premier
- Nicknames: Las Águilas (The Eagles); Los Azul-cremas (The Blue-Creams); Los Millonetas (The Million-ateds)
- Founded: 14 July 2015; 11 years ago
- Dissolved: 30 May 2019; 7 years ago
- Ground: Instalaciones Club América; Tlalpan, Mexico City, Mexico
- Capacity: 1,000
- Owner: Grupo Televisa
- Chairman: Santiago Baños
- League: Liga Premier - Serie A
- Apertura 2017: Preseason
- Website: http://www.clubamerica.com.mx/
Home colours	Away colours

Club de Fútbol América S.A. de C.V. Premier is a professional football team that plays in the Mexican Football League. They are currently playing in the Liga Premier (Mexico's Third Division). Club América Premier is affiliated with Club América who plays in the Liga MX, both play in Mexico's capital, Mexico City.

== Players ==
=== Current squad ===
Note: Flags indicate national team as defined under FIFA eligibility rules; some limited exceptions apply. Players may hold more than one non-FIFA nationality.

No. / Pos. / Nation / Player	No. / Pos. / Nation / Player

== Honours ==
=== Domestic Competitions ===
Segunda Division de Mexico

- Liga Premier de Ascenso

Runner-up (1): Clausura 2007

- Liga de Nuevos Talentos de Mexico

Winners (1): Clausura 2009

== See also ==
- Club América
