= Garzas UAEH =

Mexican football club

Universidad de Hidalgo
- Full name: Club Universidad de Hidalgo
- Nickname(s): La U (The U), Las Garzas (The Heron), Los Azules (The Blues)
- Founded: Nov 26, 1998
- Dissolved: Jul 26, 2017
- Ground: Estadio Revolución Mexicana; Pachuca, Hidalgo
- Capacity: 3,500
Home colours	Away colours

The Club Universidad Autónoma de Hidalgo Futbol Club, known simply as Club Universidad de Hidalgo, was a professional football club from Mexico based in the Periodistas neighborhood of Pachuca. It competed in the Segunda División de Mexico, the third football competition in the country. Founded on November 26, 1998, at the initiative of Lic. Gerardo Sosa Castelán, former university rector, it played its home matches at the Estadio Revolución Mexicana, which has a capacity of 3,500 spectators and hosted its home games since its inception.

As one of the most decorated clubs in Hidalgo football, Club Universidad de Hidalgo experienced its first success in 2008 when it won its first Liga de Nuevos Talentos championship. It later achieved another significant accomplishment during the Bicentennial in 2010. The club's most successful period came in the last decade, winning a total of 2 trophies, making it the third most successful club in this competition.

The team's traditional colors are blue for the jersey and shorts, while white is used for the socks. The club's crest underwent several changes over the years for stylistic reasons or to modernize its image. Its last crest, featuring a heron, was last modified in 2013. The club enjoyed a strong fan base among university students from various institutions, boasting the second highest attendance average in the third division football.

Its main historical rivalry was with the Titanes de Tulancingo, although it also had rivalries with UFD and Club Atlético Pachuca Juniors.

== History ==
On November 26, 1998, a general meeting was held alongside the Club Deportivo de Las Garzas, founded in 1957 and known as "los de la U". During this meeting, it was discussed the convenience of changing the institution's name. The proposal was made, especially within the schools of the Universidad Autónoma del Estado de Hidalgo, to establish a sports club that would unite all student athletes. Today, the Board of Trustees of the Universidad Autónoma de Hidalgo officially considers November 26, 1998, as the founding date of the club. However, some authors reject this and point to May 3, 1980, as the true founding date of the club.

== See also ==
- Football in Mexico
