= Instalaciones Club América en Coapa =

Training ground in Mexico City

Instalaciones del Club de Fútbol América
- "El Nido"
- Interactive map of Instalaciones del Club de Fútbol América
- Location: Tlalpan; Mexico City
- Coordinates: 19°18′41.05″N 99°08′14.95″W
- Owner: Club América
- Type: Sports facility

Construction
- Opened: 1973
- Cost: $177.5 million

Website
- El Nido

The Instalaciones de Club de Fútbol América is the training ground of professional football club América. It opened in 1973 and is located in the borough of Tlalpan in Mexico City. The surface area is 70,049.957 meters long, and is used by the first-team and the youth squads, as well as by the administrators and technical staff.

The ground is known by its official nickname El Nido (The Nest in English), due to the team's nickname being Las Águilas (The Eagles).

== Facilities ==
- 4 grass fields (used by both first-team and youth squads)
- 1 Designated fan area.
- 2 Gymnasiums.
- 1 Medical facility.
- 2 Locker-rooms.
- 1 Laundry-room.
- 1 Press area.
- Clubhouse.
- Club trophy room.
- Auditorium.
- Administrative offices.
- Kitchen.
- Dining room.
- Cafeteria.
- 1 Club souvenir shop.
- 1 Official Nike store.
- 2 parking lots.

The grounds were renovated and remodeled in 2008 under then-club president Michel Bauer. The architect Gustavo Soto was in charge of the project. This included the renovation of the administrative offices, locker rooms, auditorium, trophy room, and the electrical and plumbing. All of the training equipment was replaced with more modern training technology as well. The renovation was completed in 2009.
