= 2017–18 Serie A de México season =

Serie A de México
- Season: 2017-18
- Dates: 11 August 2017 – 19 May 2018
- Champions: Apertura: Tepatitlán; Clausura; Loros UdeC
- Top goalscorer: Apertura: Joaquín Alonso Hernández (13 goals); Clausura; Juan Galindrez (14 goals)
- Biggest home win: Apertura: Loros UdeC 5–0 Alacranes de Durango (11 November 2017); Clausura; Tepatitlán 5–0 Dorados Fuerza UACH (15 April 2018)
- Biggest away win: Apertura: Inter Playa del Carmen 1–5 Irapuato (3 September 2017); Clausura; Deportivo Tepic 0–5 Pacific F.C. (14 April 2018)
- Highest scoring: Apertura: Loros UdeC (44 points); Clausura; Loros UdeC; Tuxtla F.C. (39 points)
- Highest attendance: Apertura: Gavilanes de Matamoros 2–0 Loros UdeC (20,000); Clausura; Reboceros de La Piedad 1–2 Pioneros de Cancún (12,000)
- Lowest attendance: Apertura: Sporting Canamy 0–1 Lobos BUAP (0); Clausura; Deportivo Tepic 0–5 Pacific F.C. (0)
- Total attendance: Apertura: 228,104; Clausura; 173,453
- Average attendance: Apertura: 745; Clausura; 567
- Stats are from the regular season only

The 2017–18 Serie A de México season was split in two tournaments Apertura and Clausura. Serie A is the third-tier football league of Mexico. The season was played between 11 August 2017 and 19 May 2018.

== Torneo Apertura ==
=== Changes from the previous season ===
36 teams participated in this season:

- Cuervos de Ensenada J.A.P. moved to Tepic and became Deportivo Tepic J.A.P.
- Valle Verde F.C. moved to Tuxtla Gutiérrez and became Tuxtla F.C.
- Murciélagos F.C. reserve team changed its name to Pacific F.C. and plans to move to Mazatlán on 2019.
- Sporting Canamy moves from Mexico City to Oaxtepec.
- Chiapas F.C. Premier disappears and Lobos BUAP Premier took its place.
- Reynosa F.C. changed its name to Atlético Reynosa.
- Atlético Cuernavaca changed its name to Halcones de Morelos.
- Tecos F.C. was promoted from Tercera División.
- Loros UdeC was relegated from Ascenso MX.
- Gavilanes de Matamoros was admitted as an expansion team.
- Santos de Soledad and Real Cuautitlán dissolved.
- FC Politécnico was relegated to Tercera División.
- Atlético Estado de México eliminated its main team, maintaining the reserve team in Tercera División.
- Tlaxcala F.C. did not play this season having won its promotion to Ascenso MX, waiting to meet the requirements of the category.

=== Stadiums and Locations ===
==== Group 1 ====
Location of teams in the 2017–18 Serie A Group 1

Club	City	Stadium	Capacity
Alacranes de Durango	Durango City, Durango	Francisco Zarco	18,000
Atlas	Zapopan, Jalisco	Alfredo "Pistache" Torres	3,000
Atlético Reynosa	Reynosa, Tamaulipas	Unidad Deportiva Solidaridad	20,000
Deportivo Tepic	Tepic, Nayarit	Nicolás Álvarez Ortega	12,271
Dorados Fuerza UACH	Chihuahua City, Chihuahua	Olímpico Universitario José Reyes Baeza	22,000
Gavilanes de Matamoros	Matamoros, Tamaulipas	El Hogar	22,000
Guadalajara	Zapopan, Jalisco	Verde Valle	800
León	León, Guanajuato	Casa Club León	1,000
Loros UdeC	Colima City, Colima	Olímpico Universitario de Colima	11,812
Monterrey	Santiago, Nuevo León	El Barrial	570
Monarcas Morelia	Morelia, Michoacán	Morelos practice field	1,000
Necaxa	Aguascalientes City, Aguascalientes	Victoria	23,851
Pacific	Los Mochis, Sinaloa	Centenario	11,134
Santos	Torreón, Coahuila	TSM practice field	1,000
Tecos	Zapopan, Jalisco	Tres de Marzo	18,779
Tepatitlán de Morelos	Tepatitlán, Jalisco	Gregorio "Tepa" Gómez	12,500
Tigres UANL	General Zuazua, Nuevo León	Zuazua Training Center	800
Tijuana	Tijuana, Baja California	Caliente	27,333

==== Group 2 ====
Location of teams in the 2018–19 Serie A Group 2

Club	City	Stadium	Capacity
América	Tlalpan, Mexico City	Instalaciones Club América	1,000
Cruz Azul Hidalgo	Ciudad Cooperativa Cruz Azul, Hidalgo	10 de Diciembre	7,761
Cruz Azul Premier	Ciudad Cooperativa Cruz Azul, Hidalgo	10 de Diciembre	7,761
Halcones de Morelos	Cuernavaca, Morelos	Centenario	14,800
Inter Playa del Carmen	Playa del Carmen, Quintana Roo	Unidad Deportiva Mario Villanueva Madrid	7,500
Irapuato	Irapuato, Guanajuato	Sergio León Chávez	25,000
Lobos BUAP	Puebla, Puebla	Universitario BUAP	19,283
Pachuca	San Agustín Tlaxiaca, Hidalgo	Universidad del Fútbol	1,000
Pioneros de Cancún	Cancún, Quintana Roo	Andrés Quintana Roo	17,289
Puebla	Puebla, Puebla	Club Alpha Field 3	600
Querétaro	Querétaro, Querétaro	Corregidora	33,070
Real Zamora	Zamora, Michoacán	Zamora	7,200
Reboceros de La Piedad	La Piedad, Michoacán	Juan N. López	13,356
Sporting Canamy	Oaxtepec, Morelos	Olímpico de Oaxtepec	9,000
Toluca	Metepec, State of Mexico	Instalaciones de Metepec	1,000
Tuxtla	Tuxtla Gutiérrez, Chiapas	Víctor Manuel Reyna	29,001
UNAM	Coyoacán, Mexico City	La Cantera	2,000
Veracruz	Veracruz, Veracruz	CAR Veracruz	1,000

=== Regular season ===
==== Group 1 ====
===== Standings =====
Pos	Team	Pld	W	D	L	GF	GA	GD	Pts	Qualification
1	Loros UdeC	17	13	2	2	41	15	+26	44	Advance to Liguilla
2	Tepatitlán	17	11	4	2	36	15	+21	38	Advance to Liguilla
3	Tigres	17	8	5	4	22	15	+7	32	Advance to Liguilla de Filiales
4	Tijuana	17	9	2	6	30	29	+1	30	Advance to Liguilla de Filiales
5	Morelia	17	7	7	3	28	17	+11	29	Advance to Liguilla de Filiales
6	Guadalajara	17	8	4	5	20	16	+4	29	Advance to Liguilla de Filiales
7	Monterrey	17	7	4	6	29	23	+6	27	
8	Santos Laguna	17	6	5	6	27	28	−1	27	
9	Deportivo Tepic	17	5	7	5	23	19	+4	26	Advance to Liguilla
10	Dorados Fuerza UACH	17	6	8	3	19	15	+4	26	Advance to Liguilla
11	León	17	6	5	6	24	24	0	26	
12	Gavilanes de Matamoros	17	6	5	6	25	26	−1	25	
13	Atlético Reynosa	17	6	3	8	18	26	−8	21	
14	Tecos F.C.	17	4	5	8	19	28	−9	17	
15	Necaxa	17	3	5	9	16	28	−12	15	
16	Atlas	17	2	7	8	17	24	−7	13	
17	Pacific F.C.	17	3	1	13	16	33	−17	11	
18	Alacranes de Durango	17	3	1	13	12	41	−29	11	

Updated to match(es) played on November 25, 2017. Source: SoccerWay

===== Results =====
Home \ Away	ALD	ATS	ATR	DTE	DFU	GAV	GDL	LEO	LUC	MTY	MOR	NEC	PAC	SAN	TEC	TPA	TIG	TIJ
Alacranes			3–2		0–1					1–3			1–0		1–2	0–2	1–3	0–1
Atlas	0–2			0–0		2–2		0–2	1–3				3–1	0–0				5–2
Atlético Reynosa		2–1		1–0		4–2	0–1				0–1	2–0	2–1	0–2	0–0			
Deportivo Tepic	2–2				0–0	1–1		3–1	0–0	2–1	0–3						1–1	0–1
Dorados Fuerza UACH		0–0	0–0				0–0			3–1		2–0			1–0	0–0	0–0	
Gavilanes de Matamoros	2–0				2–3			3–0	2–0	1–1	3–2					0–1	0–1	1–0
Guadalajara	2–1	0–0		0–0		2–2		0–1	3–2				2–1	3–0				
León	4–0		1–1		2–0				0–3	2–3	1–1					1–0	0–0	1–2
Loros UdeC	5–0		5–2		2–1					2–0	1–1				3–0	2–1	4–1	4–2
Monterrey		3–3	4–0				0–1				1–1	5–0	1–0	2–1	1–1	0–1		
Monarcas Morelia	5–0	1–1			3–4		1–0					1–1	2–0	1–1			2–1	2–0
Necaxa		1–0		3–2		2–2	1–2	1–1	0–2				3–1	0–1				
Pacific	3–0		0–4		1–1	0–1		4–2	0–1					0–2				1–2
Santos Laguna	4–0			0–4	2–2	4–1		3–3	1–2								1–4	2–0
Tecos				1–3		3–0	0–2	0–2			2–0	1–1	1–3	3–3				
Tepatitlán		2–0	3–0	4–1			3–2				1–1	2–1	4–0	3–0	4–2			
Tigres		2–1	1–0				2–0			0–1		1–0	2–0		0–0	2–2		
Tijuana			1–2		2–1		2–0			4–2		2–2			4–2	3–3	2–1	

Updated to match(es) played on 25 November 2017. Source: SoccerWay
Legend: Blue = home team win; Yellow = draw; Red = away team win.

==== Group 2 ====
===== Standings =====
Pos	Team	Pld	W	D	L	GF	GA	GD	Pts	Qualification
1	Reboceros de La Piedad	17	10	3	4	32	21	+11	37	Advance to Liguilla
2	UNAM	17	10	4	3	29	21	+8	35	Advance to Liguilla de Filiales
3	Irapuato	17	9	4	4	37	20	+17	33	Advance to Liguilla
4	Veracruz	17	7	6	4	22	16	+6	29	Advance to Liguilla de Filiales
5	Tuxtla	17	9	1	7	26	23	+3	29	Advance to Liguilla
6	Toluca	17	6	8	3	23	17	+6	28	Advance to Liguilla de Filiales
7	Inter Playa del Carmen	17	7	5	5	28	23	+5	28	Advance to Liguilla
8	Pioneros de Cancún	17	8	3	6	24	21	+3	28	
9	América	17	7	4	6	29	25	+4	26	Advance to Liguilla de Filiales
10	Cruz Azul Hidalgo	17	7	3	7	23	19	+4	24	
11	Querétaro	17	5	7	5	24	23	+1	24	
12	Real Zamora	17	5	6	6	23	29	−6	22	
13	Puebla	17	3	7	7	22	30	−8	21	
14	Lobos BUAP	17	5	5	7	19	23	−4	20	
15	Halcones de Morelos	17	4	6	7	22	33	−11	19	
16	Cruz Azul Premier	17	4	4	9	29	40	−11	18	
17	Sporting Canamy	17	3	3	11	21	37	−16	13	
18	Pachuca	17	2	5	10	14	29	−15	11	

Updated to match(es) played on November 25, 2017. Source: SoccerWay

===== Results =====
Home \ Away	AME	CAH	CRP	HAM	IPC	IRA	LOB	PAC	PIO	PUE	QRO	RZA	RLP	SCA	TOL	TUX	UNM	VER
América		2–1	3–1	3–3	3–2		1–2	3–0	1–2								1–1	
Cruz Azul Hidalgo			3–1	1–0		1–0		1–0	5–1	0–3	4–0				1–1			0–0
Cruz Azul Premier										0–1	3–0	0–3	2–4	3–1	3–2	2–2		1–3
Halcones de Morelos			3–2						1–3	2–2	1–0		0–3		2–2	2–3		2–1
Inter Playa del Carmen		2–0	5–1	0–0		1–5		1–1	1–1	2–0	2–1				2–0			
Irapuato	1–1		2–2	5–0				4–0	3–2			4–0	1–0	3–1		2–1		
Lobos BUAP		2–0	3–3	1–1	0–1	3–2		1–1	0–0	1–1	1–3							
Pachuca			2–3	1–2					1–0	2–2	1–1			2–1	0–1	0–1		1–2
Pioneros de Cancún			1–0							3–1	0–0	1–2	3–0		0–1	2–1		2–0
Puebla	1–2					2–2					2–3	2–2	0–3	1–0	2–2	0–3		0–0
Querétaro	2–0					1–2						1–1	5–1	3–3	1–1	2–0	1–1	0–0
Real Zamora	1–3	1–1		1–2	2–1		3–2	2–0						2–3			2–3	
Reboceros de La Piedad	2–1	3–1			2–2		2–0	3–1				2–0		3–2			1–2	
Sporting Canamy	1–2	0–3		4–2	2–2		0–1		0–1								1–0	
Toluca	1–1					0–0	1–2					1–1	0–0	4–1		3–1	2–0	1–0
Tuxtla	2–1	2–1			0–2		1–0					2–1	0–2	4–0			2–3	
UNAM		1–0	2–2	1–0	3–1	2–0	1–0	1–1	4–2		3–2							
Veracruz	2–1				2–1	3–1	2–0					2–2	1–1	1–1		0–1	3–1	

Updated to match(es) played on 25 November 2017. Source: SoccerWay
Legend: Blue = home team win; Yellow = draw; Red = away team win.

=== Regular season statistics ===
==== Scoring ====
- First goal of the season: Omar Salgado (Tigres UANL Premier)

==== Top goalscorers ====
Players sorted first by goals scored, then by last name.

Rank	Player	Club	Goals
1	(Mexico) Joaquín Alonso Hernández	Monterrey Premier	13
2	(Mexico) Humberto Leonardo Guzmán	Reboceros de La Piedad	12
3	(Mexico) Brian Santiago Lara	Cruz Azul Premier	11
4	(Mexico) Marco Antonio Granados	Loros UdeC	11
5	(Brazil) Francisco Da Costa	Inter Playa del Carmen	10

Source: Liga Premier

=== Attendance ===
==== Per team ====
Pos	Team	Total	High	Low	Average	Change
1	Gavilanes de Matamoros	77,000	20,000	3,500	8,556	n/a
2	Reboceros de La Piedad	30,900	4,900	3,000	3,863	n/a
3	Deportivo Tepic	16,089	3,257	500	1,788	n/a
4	Loros UdeC	14,900	3,000	800	1,656	n/a
5	Tepatitlán	13,700	3,000	1,000	1,522	n/a
6	Tuxtla	11,200	2,500	500	1,400	n/a
7	Inter Playa del Carmen	10,500	3,000	300	1,167	n/a
8	Pioneros de Cancún	6,400	1,500	500	800	n/a
9	Atlético Reynosa	6,250	2,000	100	694	n/a
10	Irapuato	6,150	1,300	300	683	n/a
11	Real Zamora	5,000	1,800	200	625	n/a
12	Dorados Fuerza UACH	3,000	600	200	375	n/a
13	Alacranes de Durango	2,850	1,000	200	356	n/a
14	Tecos	2,500	600	100	278	n/a
15	Cruz Azul Hidalgo	1,850	300	50	206	n/a
16	Guadalajara	1,350	400	50	169	n/a
17	Atlas	1,300	250	100	163	n/a
18	América	1,350	250	50	150	n/a
19	Pacific	1,200	300	100	150	n/a
20	Veracruz	1,300	300	50	144	n/a
21	UNAM	1,230	200	50	137	n/a
22	Querétaro	1,180	200	50	131	n/a
23	Lobos BUAP	1,150	200	50	128	n/a
24	Cruz Azul Premier	950	200	100	119	n/a
25	Necaxa	920	200	70	115	n/a
26	Halcones de Morelos	900	200	50	113	n/a
27	Toluca	1,000	200	50	111	n/a
28	Puebla	850	150	50	106	n/a
29	Pachuca	920	150	70	102	n/a
30	Monarcas Morelia	830	100	50	92	n/a
31	León	750	150	50	83	n/a
32	Tijuana	605	100	50	76	n/a
33	Santos Laguna	600	100	50	76	n/a
34	Monterrey	600	100	50	67	n/a
35	Tigres	530	150	30	66	n/a
36	Sporting Canamy	300	100	0	50	n/a
	League total	228,104	20,000	0	745	n/a

Updated to games played on 25 November 2017
Source: Liga Premier FMF (available in each game report)
Notes:
Only regular season listed
1: Team played Serie B last season.
2: Team played Ascenso MX last season.

==== Highest and lowest ====
Highest attendance					Lowest attendance			
Week	Home	Score	Away	Attendance	Home	Score	Away	Attendance
1	Reboceros de La Piedad	2–0	Lobos BUAP	4,500	Monarcas Morelia	2–1	Tigres UANL	50
2	Gavilanes de Matamoros	2–0	Alacranes de Durango	15,000	Tigres UANL	2–0	Pacific F.C.	50
3	Reboceros de La Piedad	1–2	UNAM	3,000	Tecos F.C.	0–2	León	100
4	Gavilanes de Matamoros	2–0	Loros UdeC	20,000	Tigres UANL	2–1	Atlas	30
5	Reboceros de La Piedad	2–1	América	3,500	Monarcas Morelia	3–4	Dorados Fuerza UACH	50
6	Gavilanes de Matamoros	3–0	León	9,000	Tigres UANL	2–0	Guadalajara	50
7	Loros UdeC	2–0	Monterrey	3,000	Veracruz	3–1	UNAM	50
8	Gavilanes de Matamoros	3–2	Monarcas Morelia	5,500	Monterrey	1–1	Tecos F.C.	50
9	Gavilanes de Matamoros	0–1	Tepatitlán	6,000	Monarcas Morelia	2-0	Tijuana	80
10	Tepatitlán	1–1	Monarcas Morelia	3,000	Tigres UANL	0–0	Tecos F.C.	50
11	Gavilanes de Matamoros	1–1	Monterrey	7,000	Monarcas Morelia	1–0	Guadalajara	50
12	Reboceros de La Piedad	3–1	Pachuca	4,000	Sporting Canamy	2–2	Inter Playa del Carmen	50
13	Gavilanes de Matamoros	0–1	Tigres UANL	7,500	León	2–0	Dorados Fuerza UACH	50
14	Reboceros de La Piedad	3–1	Cruz Azul Hidalgo	5,000	Sporting Canamy	0–1	Lobos BUAP	0
15	Gavilanes de Matamoros	2–3	Dorados Fuerza UACH	3,500	Cruz Azul Hidalgo	1–0	Pachuca	50
16	Reboceros de La Piedad	2–2	Inter Playa del Carmen	3,000	Sporting Canamy	1–0	UNAM	50
17	Gavilanes de Matamoros	1–0	Tijuana	3,500	Santos Laguna	1–4	Tigres UANL	50

Source:Liga Premier FMF (available in each game report)

=== Liguilla de Ascenso (Promotion Playoffs) ===
The four best teams of each group play two games against each other on a home-and-away basis. The higher seeded teams play on their home field during the second leg. The winner of each match up is determined by aggregate score. In the quarterfinals and semifinals, if the two teams are tied on aggregate the higher seeded team advances. In the final, if the two teams are tied after both legs, the match goes to extra time and, if necessary, a penalty shoot-out.

Quarter-finals
1	Loros UdeC	3	3	6
8	Dorados Fuerza UACH	0	0	0
4	Irapuato	0	3	3
5	Tuxtla	1	0	1
2	Tepatitlán	0	4	4
7	Deportivo Tepic	0	0	0
3	Reboceros de La Piedad	1	2	3
6	Inter Playa del Carmen	2	0	2

Semi-finals
1	Loros UdeC	1	1	2
4	Irapuato	2	1	3
2	Tepatitlán (s)	0	0	0
3	Reboceros de La Piedad	0	0	0

Final
4	Irapuato	1	1	2 (3)
2	Tepatitlán	0	2	2 (5)

==== Quarter-finals ====
The first legs was played on 29 and 30 November 2017, and the second legs was played on 2 and 3 December 2017.

Team 1	Agg.	Team 2	1st leg	2nd leg
Loros UdeC	6–0	Dorados Fuerza UACH	3–0	3–0
Irapuato	3–1	Tuxtla	0–1	3–0
Tepatitlán	4–0	Deportivo Tepic	0–0	4–0
Reboceros de La Piedad	3–2	Inter Playa del Carmen	1–2	2–0

===== First leg =====
29 November 2017	Tuxtla	1–0	Irapuato	Tuxtla Gutiérrez, Chiapas
15:00	C. Ramos 71'	Report		Stadium: Estadio Víctor Manuel Reyna; Attendance: 3,000; Referee: (Mexico) Arturo Isai González

29 November 2017	Inter Playa del Carmen	2–1	Reboceros de La Piedad	Playa del Carmen, Quintana Roo
19:00	B. Tun 64'; S. Terán 71'	Report	H. Guzmán 36'	Stadium: Estadio Mario Villanueva Madrid; Attendance: 2,500; Referee: (Mexico) Arturo Alcántara

29 November 2017	Dorados Fuerza UACH	0–3	Loros UdeC	Chihuahua City, Chihuahua
20:00		Report	R. Valdéz 1'; V. Mañón 16'; A. Nuño 34'	Stadium: Estadio Olímpico Universitario José Reyes Baeza; Attendance: 836; Referee: (Mexico) Juan Canales

30 November 2017	Deportivo Tepic	0-0	Tepatitlán	Tepic, Nayarit
20:30		Report		Stadium: Estadio Nicolás Álvarez Ortega; Attendance: 3,974; Referee: (Mexico) Oziel Méndez

===== Second leg =====
2 December 2017	Loros UdeC	3–0 (6–0 agg.)	Dorados Fuerza UACH	Colima City, Colima
16:00	A. Valdéz 21'; A. Nuño 75'; O. Estrada 78'	Report		Stadium: Estadio Olímpico Universitario de Colima; Attendance: 2,500; Referee: (Mexico) Jesús López

2 December 2017	Irapuato	3–0 (3–1 agg.)	Tuxtla	Irapuato, Guanajuato
19:00	G. Martínez 50'; J. Valdivia 51'; J.L. Estada 88'	Report		Stadium: Estadio Sergio León Chávez; Attendance: 850; Referee: (Mexico) Jesús Roberto Rui

2 December 2017	Reboceros de La Piedad	2–0 (3–2 agg.)	Inter Playa del Carmen	La Piedad, Michoacán
20:00	J. Salas 27'; D. Hernández 85'	Report		Stadium: Estadio Juan N. López; Attendance: 7,000; Referee: (Mexico) Alan Enrique Martínez

3 December 2017	Tepatitlán	4–0 (4–0 agg.)	Deportivo Tepic	Tepatitlán de Morelos, Jalisco
16:00	L. Rodríguez 15'; M. Ramos 50'; R. Reynoso 77'; D. Aguiñaga 81'	Report		Stadium: Estadio Gregorio "Tepa" Gómez; Attendance: 3,500; Referee: (Mexico) Antonio Olalde

==== Semi-finals ====
The first legs was played on 6 and 7 December 2017, and the second legs was played on 9 and 10 December 2017.

Team 1	Agg.	Team 2	1st leg	2nd leg
Loros UdeC	2–3	Irapuato	1–2	1–1
Tepatitlán	(s) 0–0	Reboceros de La Piedad	0–0	0–0

===== First leg =====
6 December 2017	Irapuato	2–1	Loros UdeC	Irapuato, Guanajuato
20:00	O. Montero 1'; G. Martínez 44'	Report	A. Monzonis 30'	Stadium: Estadio Sergio León Chávez; Attendance: 2,200; Referee: (Mexico) Guillermo Pacheco

7 December 2017	Reboceros de La Piedad	0–0	Tepatitlán	La Piedad, Michoacán
20:00		Report		Stadium: Estadio Juan N. López; Attendance: 7,000; Referee: (Mexico) Arturo Isai González

===== Second leg =====
9 December 2017	Loros UdeC	1–1 (2–3 agg.)	Irapuato	Colima City, Colima
16:00	A. Monzonis 50'	Report	J. Valdivia 67'	Stadium: Estadio Olímpico Universitario de Colima; Attendance: 5,000; Referee: (Mexico) Luis Daniel Chávez

10 December 2017	Tepatitlán (s)	0–0 (0–0 agg.)	Reboceros de La Piedad	Tepatitlán de Morelos, Jalisco
16:00		Report		Stadium: Estadio Gregorio "Tepa" Gómez; Attendance: 6,000; Referee: (Mexico) Antonio de Jesús Vázquez Olalde

==== Final ====
The first leg was played on 13 December 2017, and the second leg was played on 16 December 2017.

Team 1	Agg.	Team 2	1st leg	2nd leg
Tepatitlán	2–2	Irapuato	0–1	2–1

===== First leg =====
13 December 2017	Irapuato	1–0	Tepatitlán	Irapuato, Guanajuato
20:30	L. Razo 75'	Report		Stadium: Estadio Sergio León Chávez; Attendance: 4,610; Referee: (Mexico) Jesús Roberto Ruíz

===== Second leg =====
16 December 2017	Tepatitlán	2–1 (2–2 agg.) (5:3 p)	Irapuato	Tepatitlán de Morelos, Jalisco
15:00	J. Ruíz 19'; A. Soria 90+2'	Report	J. Guzmán 72'	Stadium: Estadio Gregorio "Tepa" Gómez; Attendance: 6,200; Referee: (Mexico) Luis Daniel Chávez León
	Penalties
	(penalty scored) Ramos; (penalty scored) Ruíz; (penalty scored) Saavedra; (penalty scored) Aguiñaga; (penalty scored) Rodríguez		(penalty scored) Moreno; (penalty missed) Martínez; (penalty scored) Silva; (penalty scored) Estrada

Torneo Apertura 2017 winners

1st title

==== Liguilla de Filiales (Reserve Teams Playoffs) ====
Quarter-finals
1	UNAM (c.)	2	1	3
8	América	1	2	3
2	Tigres	0	1	1
7	Toluca (a)	0	1	1
3	Tijuana	1	1	2
7	Guadalajara	1	0	1
4	Monarcas Morelia	1	4	5
5	Veracruz	1	1	2

Semi-finals
1	UNAM	0	1	1
7	Toluca (a)	0	1	1
3	Tijuana	0	0	0
4	Monarcas Morelia	2	0	2

Final
7	Toluca	1	1	2
4	Monarcas Morelia	0	1	1

== Torneo Clausura ==
=== Regular season ===
==== Group 1 ====
===== Standings =====
Pos	Team	Pld	W	D	L	GF	GA	GD	Pts	Qualification
1	Loros UdeC	17	11	3	3	36	14	+22	39	Advance to Liguilla
2	Necaxa	17	9	4	4	22	18	+4	32	Advance to Liguilla de Filiales
3	Tigres	17	8	5	4	22	12	+10	30	Advance to Liguilla de Filiales
4	Alacranes de Durango	17	8	3	6	23	19	+4	29	Advance to Liguilla
5	Atlas	17	7	5	5	23	23	0	28	Advance to Liguilla de Filiales
6	Atlético Reynosa	17	7	4	6	24	12	+12	26	Advance to Liguilla
7	Tepatitlán	17	7	4	6	25	19	+6	26	Advance to Liguilla
8	Pacific F.C.	17	7	4	6	24	19	+5	26	
9	Guadalajara	17	5	8	4	15	15	0	26	Advance to Liguilla de Filiales
10	Monarcas Morelia	17	5	7	5	20	20	0	23	
11	Tecos F.C.	17	6	4	7	16	17	−1	23	
12	Santos Laguna	17	6	4	7	22	25	−3	22	
13	Gavilanes de Matamoros	17	5	6	6	18	24	−6	22	
14	León	17	6	2	9	16	23	−7	21	
15	Deportivo Tepic	16	5	3	8	12	27	−15	18	
16	Dorados Fuerza UACH	16	4	3	9	16	30	−14	16	
17	Tijuana	17	3	6	8	25	30	−5	15	
18	Monterrey	17	2	7	8	14	26	−12	14	

Updated to match(es) played on April 22, 2018. Source: SoccerWay

===== Results =====
Home \ Away	ALD	ATS	ATR	DTE	DFU	GAV	GDL	LEO	LUC	MTY	MOR	NEC	PAC	SAN	TEC	TPA	TIG	TIJ
Alacranes		1–1		2–1		1–0	2–0	1–0	0–2		1–0		3–0	2–1				
Atlas			1–0		3–1		2–2			2–1	1–1	0–2			1–0	1–3	0–0	
Atlético Reynosa	1–0				4–0			0–0	2–1	5–0						4–0	1–0	1–1
Deportivo Tepic		1–0	0–3				0–0					1–0	0–5	1–2	0–2	0–1		
Dorados Fuerza UACH	2–2					1–0		2–2	1–2		0–1		1–2	2–1				3–2
Gavilanes de Matamoros		3–1	3–2	1–1			2–2					1–1	2–1	0–0	0–0			
Guadalajara			0–0		1–0					1–0	3–3	1–2			1–0	0–0	1–0	1–1
León		1–3		0–1		0–1	0–1					1–0	1–2	1–0	2–1			
Loros UdeC		4–2		1–2		4–0	1–1	2–0				4–0	0–0	3–0				
Monterrey	2–2			1–1	1–1	4–1		0–1	1–2								0–2	0–0
Monarcas Morelia			0–0	1–2		2–1		1–3	0–3	0–1					1–1	1–0		
Necaxa	3–2		2–0		2–1					0–0	0–4				3–0	1–0	3–1	1–1
Pacific		0–1	1–0				1–0			4–0	1–1	0–0			0–1	3–1	1–1	
Santos Laguna		1–2	2–1				1–0			2–1	1–1	1–2	4–2		1–1	3–2		
Tecos	0–2		1–0		2–0				1–3	1–1						2–1	0–1	3–0
Tepatitlán	1–0				5–0	3–0		3–0	1–1	1–1							0–0	3–2
Tigres	3–1			3–0	0–1	0–0		3–1	2–1		1–1			3–1				2–0
Tijuana	2–1	2–2		5–1		1–3		2–3	1–2		1–2		3–1	1–1				

Updated to match(es) played on 22 April 2018. Source: SoccerWay
Legend: Blue = home team win; Yellow = draw; Red = away team win.

==== Group 2 ====
===== Standings =====
Pos	Team	Pld	W	D	L	GF	GA	GD	Pts	Qualification
1	Tuxtla	17	12	2	3	31	12	+19	39	Advance to Liguilla
2	Reboceros de La Piedad	17	10	3	4	28	17	+11	36	Advance to Liguilla
3	Irapuato	17	9	5	3	32	23	+9	34	Advance to Liguilla
4	Inter Playa del Carmen	17	8	7	2	23	14	+9	33	Advance to Liguilla
5	Pioneros de Cancún	17	10	2	5	18	13	+5	33	
6	América	17	8	3	6	26	20	+6	29	Advance to Liguilla de Filiales
7	Real Zamora	17	6	5	6	21	21	0	26	
8	Puebla	17	6	5	6	22	22	0	24	Advance to Liguilla de Filiales
9	Querétaro	17	5	7	5	22	18	+4	23	Advance to Liguilla de Filiales
10	Cruz Azul Hidalgo	17	5	5	7	20	19	+1	22	
11	Halcones de Morelos	17	4	8	5	15	18	−3	22	
12	Sporting Canamy	17	5	5	7	20	29	−9	21	Last team on Relegation table
13	Veracruz	17	5	4	8	16	17	−1	20	Advance to Liguilla de Filiales
14	Lobos BUAP	17	3	9	5	19	26	−7	20	
15	Cruz Azul Premier	17	4	5	8	20	28	−8	18	
16	Toluca	17	3	6	8	16	24	−8	18	
17	UNAM	17	3	3	11	21	33	−12	16	
18	Pachuca	17	3	4	10	14	30	−16	13	

Updated to match(es) played on April 22, 2018. Source: SoccerWay

===== Results =====
Home \ Away	AME	CAH	CRP	HAM	IPC	IRA	LOB	PAC	PIO	PUE	QRO	RZA	RLP	SCA	TOL	TUX	UNM	VER
América						1–1				1–2	1–0	1–0	2–1		3–0	1–2		3–0
Cruz Azul Hidalgo	3–4				2–2		1–2					3–0	0–1	1–2		0–1	1–0	
Cruz Azul Premier	3–3	0–1		1–1	0–0	4–5	0–0	4–1	2–1								1–0	
Halcones de Morelos	1–0	1–1			2–3	1–2	2–2	0–0				0–0		0–0			2–1	
Inter Playa del Carmen	0–0						1–0					3–0	1–0	3–0		0–4	3–3	0–0
Irapuato		1–0			0–0		4–2			4–3	1–1				0–3		3–1	2–1
Lobos BUAP	1–0											2–2	2–2	1–2	1–1	0–0	1–5	1–0
Pachuca	1–3	0–1			0–3	3–0	1–1					2–2	0–2				2–1	
Pioneros de Cancún	1–0	0–2		0–1	1–0	0–3	2–0	2–1						2–1			2–0	
Puebla		2–1	1–0	0–0	0–1		1–1	1–2	0–2								0–1	
Querétaro		1–1	3–0	2–2	0–1		2–2	2–0	0–1	1–1								
Real Zamora			1–0			1–1			0–1	1–2	1–2		2–1		2–0	2–0		1–0
Reboceros de La Piedad			3–1	1–0		2–1			1–2	1–1	2–1				2–2	3–1		2–0
Sporting Canamy	3–1		2–2			0–4		0–0		1–4	1–1	1–4	0–1		2–1	1–2		2–0
Toluca		2–2	0–2	0–1	2–2			2–1	0–0	0–1	0–0							
Tuxtla			5–0	2–1		0–0		3–0	1–0	4–2	2–0				2–1			2–0
UNAM	1–2										1–4	2–2	1–3	2–2	1–2	1–0		0–3
Veracruz		0–0	1–0	3–0				3–0	1–1	1–1	1–2				2–0			

Updated to match(es) played on 22 April 2018. Source: SoccerWay
Legend: Blue = home team win; Yellow = draw; Red = away team win.

=== Regular season statistics ===
==== Scoring ====
- First goal of the season: Omar Salgado (Tigres UANL Premier)

==== Top goalscorers ====
Players sorted first by goals scored, then by last name.

Rank	Player	Club	Goals
1	(Colombia) Juan Galíndrez	Tijuana Premier	14
2	(Mexico) José Pablo Velasco	Necaxa Premier	9
2	(Mexico) Javier de Jesús Que	Tuxtla F.C.	9
2	(Mexico) Aldo Monzonis	Loros UdeC	9
2	(Mexico) Josué de Jesús Bustos	Gavilanes de Matamoros	9

Source: Liga Premier

=== Attendance ===
==== Per team ====
Pos	Team	Total	High	Low	Average	Change
1	Gavilanes de Matamoros	30,205	6,200	1,200	3,776	−55.9%
2	Reboceros de La Piedad	28,400	12,000	700	3,156	−18.3%
3	Tepatitlán	16,100	3,000	800	2,013	+32.3%
4	Atlético Reynosa	11,000	4,000	300	1,375	+98.1%
5	Tuxtla F.C.	12,300	3,000	1,100	1,367	−2.4%
6	Loros UdeC	7,500	2,000	300	1,071	−35.3%
7	Irapuato	7,950	4,000	50	994	+45.5%
8	Deportivo Tepic	6,099	2,567	0	762	−57.4%
9	Pioneros de Cancún	6,850	1,100	250	761	−4.9%
10	Alacranes de Durango	6,650	1,500	350	739	+107.6%
11	Real Zamora	6,400	1,500	200	711	+13.8%
12	Inter Playa del Carmen	4,000	1,000	0	500	−57.2%
13	Tecos	3,050	500	200	381	+37.1%
14	Pacific F.C.	2,200	500	100	244	+62.7%
15	Cruz Azul Hidalgo	1,750	300	150	219	+6.3%
16	Atlas	1,925	500	75	214	+31.3%
17	Sporting Canamy	2,278	1,508	20	207	+314.0%
18	Cruz Azul Premier	1,800	500	100	200	+68.1%
19	Dorados Fuerza UACH	1,350	300	100	169	−54.9%
20	Halcones de Morelos	1,400	200	100	156	+38.1%
21	Pachuca	1,200	250	50	150	+47.1%
22	Monterrey	1,152	500	50	144	+114.9%
23	UNAM	1,100	300	100	138	+0.7%
24	Puebla	1,060	300	60	133	+25.5%
25	Veracruz	1,000	200	100	125	−13.2%
26	Querétaro	1,000	200	100	125	−4.6%
27	Guadalajara	1,120	250	50	124	−26.6%
28	América	950	200	50	119	−20.7%
29	Necaxa	950	200	100	119	+3.5%
30	Lobos BUAP	900	250	50	113	−11.7%
31	Tijuana	747	133	33	83	+9.2%
32	Monarcas Morelia	650	150	50	81	−12.0%
33	Tigres	697	100	50	77	+16.7%
34	Toluca	610	100	10	76	−31.5%
35	Santos Laguna	680	100	30	76	+1.3%
36	León	430	100	30	54	−34.9%
	League total	173,453	12,000	0	567	−23.9%

Updated to games played on 22 April 2018
Source: Liga Premier FMF (available in each game report)
Notes:
Only regular season listed
1: Team played Serie B last season.
2: Team played Ascenso MX last season.

==== Highest and lowest ====
Highest attendance					Lowest attendance			
Week	Home	Score	Away	Attendance	Home	Score	Away	Attendance
1	Gavilanes de Matamoros	2–2	Guadalajara	5,000	Sporting Canamy	3–1	América	30
2	Reboceros de La Piedad	2–1	Querétaro	1,500	Sporting Canamy	2–2	Cruz Azul Premier	20
3	Gavilanes de Matamoros	1–1	Necaxa	5,555	Sporting Canamy	0–4	Irapuato	50
4	Tuxtla	2–0	Querétaro	1,500	Tijuana	1–1	Santos Laguna	48
5	Gavilanes de Matamoros	0–0	Tecos	3,000	Sporting Canamy	1–4	Real Zamora	50
6	Tuxtla	4–2	Puebla	3,200	Morelia	0–0	Atlético Reynosa	50
7	Gavilanes de Matamoros	3–2	Atlético Reynosa	6,200	Monterrey	1–2	Loros UdeC	50
8	Reboceros de La Piedad	1–2	Pioneros de Cancún	12,000	Inter Playa del Carmen	3–3	UNAM	0
9	Tepatitlán	3–0	Gavilanes de Matamoros	1,300	Santos Laguna	1–1	Tecos	50
10	Gavilanes de Matamoros	1–1	Deportivo Tepic	1,200	Guadalajara	1–1	Tijuana	50
11	Reboceros de La Piedad	2–1	Irapuato	1,200	América	3–0	Toluca	50
12	Atlético Reynosa	4–0	Tigres	4,000	Toluca	0–2	Cruz Azul Premier	10
13	Reboceros de La Piedad	3–1	Tuxtla	3,500	Tigres	0–0	Gavilanes de Matamoros	50
14	Loros UdeC	1–1	Guadalajara	2,000	Querétaro	3–0	Cruz Azul Premier	100
15	Reboceros de La Piedad	2–0	Veracruz	2,500	Tijuana	2–3	León	33
16	Loros UdeC	4–0	Necaxa	5,000	Deportivo Tepic	0–5	Pacific	0
17	Reboceros de La Piedad	2–2	Toluca	5,000	Monarcas Morelia	0–3	Loros UdeC	50

Source:Liga Premier FMF (available in each game report)

=== Liguilla de Ascenso (Promotion Playoffs) ===
The four best teams of each group play two games against each other on a home-and-away basis. The higher seeded teams play on their home field during the second leg. The winner of each match up is determined by aggregate score. In the quarterfinals and semifinals, if the two teams are tied on aggregate the higher seeded team advances. In the final, if the two teams are tied after both legs, the match goes to extra time and, if necessary, a penalty shoot-out.

Quarter-finals
1	Loros UdeC	2	1	3
8	Tepatitlán	0	1	1
2	Tuxtla F.C.	1	1	2
7	Atlético Reynosa	1	2	3
3	Reboceros de La Piedad	1	1	2
6	Alacranes de Durango	0	0	0
4	Irapuato	2	3	5
5	Inter Playa del Carmen	2	0	2

Semi-finals
1	Loros UdeC	2	2	4
7	Atlético Reynosa	0	0	0
3	Reboceros de La Piedad	0	4	4
4	Irapuato	0	0	0

Final
1	Loros UdeC	2	3	5
3	Reboceros de La Piedad	0	0	0

==== Quarter-finals ====
The first legs was played on 25 and 26 April 2018, and the second legs was played on 28 and 29 April 2018.

Team 1	Agg.	Team 2	1st leg	2nd leg
Loros UdeC	3–1	Tepatitlán	2–0	1–1
Tuxtla F.C.	2–3	Atlético Reynosa	1–1	1–2
Reboceros de La Piedad	2–0	Alacranes de Durango	1–0	1–0
Irapuato	5–2	Inter Playa del Carmen	2–2	3–0

===== First leg =====
25 April 2018	Tepatitlán	0–2	Loros UdeC	Zapopan, Jalisco
17:00		Report	V. Mañón 46'; M. Nuño 85'	Stadium: Estadio Tres de Marzo; Attendance: 500; Referee: (Mexico) Carlos Alberto Pérez Gutiérrez

25 April 2018	Inter Playa del Carmen	2—2	Irapuato	Playa del Carmen, Quintana Roo
19:00	M. Menes 33'; R. César 50'	Report	E. Hernández 52' (o.g.); G. Martínez 80'	Stadium: Estadio Mario Villanueva Madrid; Attendance: 1,600; Referee: (Mexico) Luis Daniel Chávez León

25 April 2018	Alacranes de Durango	0–1	Reboceros de La Piedad	Durango City, Durango
20:00		Report	F. Góndola 43'	Stadium: Estadio Francisco Zarco; Attendance: 2,136; Referee: (Mexico) Jesús Rafael López Valle

26 April 2018	Atlético Reynosa	1–1	Tuxtla F.C.	Reynosa, Tamaulipas
19:30	I. Vázquez 90+4'	Report	Y. Delgadillo 74'	Stadium: Unidad Deportiva Solidaridad; Attendance: 5,000; Referee: (Mexico) Héctor Adrián Pineda Flores

===== Second leg =====
28 April 2018	Loros UdeC	1–1 (3–1 agg.)	Tepatitlán	Colima City, Colima
16:00	C. Arreola 44'	Report	A. Rodríguez 28'	Stadium: Estadio Olímpico Universitario de Colima; Attendance: 3,750; Referee: (Mexico) Edgardo Espejo Tello

28 April 2018	Irapuato	3–0 (5–2 agg.)	Inter Playa del Carmen	Irapuato, Guanajuato
19:00	J. Salas 41'; L. Razo 44'; J. Valdivia 88'	Report		Stadium: Estadio Sergio León Chávez; Attendance: 2,090; Referee: (Mexico) Guillermo Pacheco Larios

28 April 2018	Reboceros de La Piedad	1–0 (2–0 agg.)	Alacranes de Durango	La Piedad, Michoacán
20:00	A. Jaramillo 87'	Report		Stadium: Estadio Juan N. López; Attendance: 4,000; Referee: (Mexico) Alan Enrique Martínez Vega

29 April 2018	Tuxtla F.C.	1–2 (2–3 agg.)	Atlético Reynosa	Tuxtla Gutiérrez, Chiapas
16:00	Y. Delgadillo 84'	Report	E. Torres 15'; E. Villegas 25'	Stadium: Estadio Víctor Manuel Reyna; Attendance: 5,000; Referee: (Mexico) Jesús Roberto Ruíz González

==== Semi-finals ====
The first legs was played on 2 May 2018, and the second legs was played on 5 May 2018.

Team 1	Agg.	Team 2	1st leg	2nd leg
Loros UdeC	4–0	Atlético Reynosa	2–0	2–0
Reboceros de La Piedad	4–0	Irapuato	0–0	4–0

===== First leg =====
2 May 2018	Atlético Reynosa	0–2	Loros UdeC	Reynosa, Tamaulipas
19:30		Report	V. Mañón 8', 64'	Stadium: Unidad Deportiva Solidaridad; Attendance: 8,000; Referee: (Mexico) Guillermo Pacheco Larios

2 May 2018	Irapuato	0–0	Reboceros de La Piedad	Irapuato, Guanajuato
20:00		Report		Stadium: Estadio Sergio León Chávez; Attendance: 2,560; Referee: (Mexico) Alan Enrique Martínez Vega

===== Second leg =====
5 May 2018	Loros UdeC	2–0 (4–0 agg.)	Atlético Reynosa	Colima City, Colima
16:00	A. Monzonis 14'; L. García 90'	Report		Stadium: Estadio Olímpico Universitario de Colima; Attendance: 3,500; Referee: (Mexico) Luis Daniel Chávez León

5 May 2018	Reboceros de La Piedad	4–0 (4–0 agg.)	Irapuato	La Piedad, Michoacán
20:00	J. Ramírez 12'; F. Góndola 44'; E. Kumul 70'; D. Hernández 73'	Report		Stadium: Estadio Juan N. López; Attendance: 7,000; Referee: (Mexico) Jesús Roberto Ruíz González

==== Final ====
The first leg was played on 9 May 2018, and the second leg was played on 12 May 2018.

Team 1	Agg.	Team 2	1st leg	2nd leg
Loros UdeC	5–0	Reboceros de La Piedad	2–0	3–0

===== First leg =====
9 May 2018	Reboceros de La Piedad	0–2	Loros UdeC	La Piedad, Michoacán
20:00		Report	E. Mendoza 1'; M. Guzmán 82'	Stadium: Estadio Juan N. López; Attendance: 13,500; Referee: (Mexico) Luis Daniel Chávez León

===== Second leg =====
12 May 2018	Loros UdeC	3–0 (5–0 agg.)	Reboceros de La Piedad	Colima City, Colima
16:00	A. Monzonis 9'; V. Mañón 24'; R. Valdéz 46'	Report		Stadium: Estadio Olímpico Universitario de Colima; Attendance: 10,000; Referee: (Mexico) Guillermo Pacheco Larios

Torneo Clausura 2018 winners

2nd title

==== Liguilla de Filiales (Reserve Teams Playoffs) ====
Quarter-finals
1	Necaxa	0	5	5
8	Veracruz	1	1	2
2	Tigres	1	1	1
7	Querétaro (a)	0	2	2
3	América	1	3	4
6	Puebla	3	2	5
4	Atlas	2	2	4
5	Guadalajara	3	2	5

Semi-finals
1	Necaxa	0	4	4
7	Querétaro	1	0	1
6	Puebla	1	1	2
5	Guadalajara	0	0	0

Final
1	Necaxa	2	1	3
6	Puebla	1	0	1

== Relegation Table ==
P	Team	Pts	G	Pts/G
1	Loros UdeC	83	34	2.4412
2	Reboceros de La Piedad	73	34	2.1471
3	Tuxtla F.C.	68	34	2
4	Irapuato	67	34	1.9706
5	Tepatitlán	64	34	1.8824
6	Tigres	62	34	1.8235
7	Inter Playa del Carmen	61	34	1.7941
8	Pioneros de Cancún	61	34	1.7941
9	América	55	34	1.6176
10	Guadalajara	55	34	1.6176
11	Monarcas Morelia	52	34	1.5294
12	UNAM	51	34	1.5
13	Veracruz	49	34	1.4412
14	Santos Laguna	49	34	1.4412
15	Necaxa	48	34	1.4118
16	Real Zamora	48	34	1.4118
17	León	47	34	1.3824
18	Atlético Reynosa	47	34	1.3824
19	Querétaro	47	34	1.3824
20	Gavilanes de Matamoros	47	34	1.3824
21	Cruz Azul Hidalgo	46	34	1.3529
22	Toluca	46	34	1.3529
23	Deportivo Tepic	44	33	1.3333
24	Tijuana	45	34	1.3235
25	Puebla	45	34	1.3235
26	Dorados Fuerza UACH	42	33	1.2727
27	Atlas	41	34	1.2059
28	Monterrey	41	34	1.2059
29	Lobos BUAP	40	34	1.1765
30	Alacranes de Durango	40	34	1.1765
31	Halcones de Morelos	40	34	1.1765
32	Tecos	40	34	1.1765
33	F.C.	37	34	1.0882
34	Cruz Azul Premier	36	34	1.0588
35	Sporting Canamy	34	34	1
36	Pachuca	24	34	0.7059

Last updated: 22 April 2018
Source: Liga Premier FMF
P = Position; G = Games played; Pts = Points; Pts/G = Ratio of points to games played

== Promotion Final ==
The Promotion Final is a series of matches played by the champions of the tournaments Apertura and Clausura, the game is played to determine the winning team of the promotion to Ascenso MX. The first leg was played on 16 May 2018, and the second leg was played on 19 May 2018.

Team 1	Agg.	Team 2	1st leg	2nd leg
Loros UdeC	2–2	Tepatitlán	0–2	2–0

=== First leg ===
16 May 2018	Tepatitlán	2–0	Loros UdeC	Tepatitlán de Morelos, Jalisco
17:00	L. Rodríguez 33'; J. Ruíz 82'	Report		Stadium: Estadio Gregorio "Tepa" Gómez; Attendance: 4,800; Referee: (Mexico) Jesús Roberto Ruíz González

=== Second leg ===
19 May 2018	Loros UdeC	2–0 (2–2 agg.) (3–4 p)	Tepatitlán	Colima City, Colima
16:00	V. Mañón 4', 12'	Report		Stadium: Estadio Olímpico Universitario de Colima; Attendance: 5,200; Referee: (Mexico) Guillermo Pacheco Larios
	Penalties
	(penalty scored) Mañón; (penalty missed) Granados; (penalty scored) Hernández; (penalty scored) Becerra; (penalty missed) Valdéz		(penalty scored) Ramos; (penalty missed) Saavedra; (penalty scored) Ruíz; (penalty scored) Díaz; (penalty scored) Rodríguez

2017–18 Serie A de México winners

1st title

== See also ==
- 2017–18 Liga MX season
- 2017–18 Ascenso MX season
- 2017–18 Serie B de México season
