= 2015–16 Liga Premier de Ascenso season =

Liga Premier de Ascenso
- Season: 2015–16
- Dates: 14 August 2015 – 15 May 2016
- Champions: Apertura: Potros UAEM; Clausura; Tampico Madero
- Relegated: Petroleros de Veracruz
- Top goalscorer: Apertura: Dante Osorio (12 goals); Clausura; Luis Eduardo Rodríguez (18 goals)
- Biggest home win: Apertura: Cruz Azul Premier 8–1 Petroleros (3 October 2015); Clausura; Cimarrones "B" 8–0 Dorados Premier (6 February 2016)
- Biggest away win: Apertura: Real Cuautitlán 0–6 Tepatitlán (21 November 2015); Clausura; Cruz Azul Premier 3–8 Tlaxcala (9 April 2016)
- Highest scoring: Apertura: Tlaxcala (39 points); Clausura; Cruz Azul Hidalgo; Tlaxcala (34 points)
- Stats are from the regular season only

The 2015–16 Liga Premier de Ascenso season was split in two tournaments Apertura and Clausura. Liga Premier was the third-tier football league of Mexico. The season was played between 14 August 2015 and 15 May 2016.

== Torneo Apertura ==
=== Changes from the previous season ===
46 teams participated in this tournament.

- By arrangement of the FMF, the 18 teams of Liga MX created a reserve team to participate in the Liga Premier de Ascenso.
- Estudiantes Tecos was relocated to Zacatecas City and renamed Mineros de Zacatecas "B".
- Internacional de Acapulco moved to State of Mexico and was renamed Atlético Estado de México.
- Teca UTN renamed as Chapulineros de Oaxaca after being acquired by new owners who moved the team to Oaxaca City.
- Irapuato returned to the Liga Premier de Ascenso, after one year in Ascenso MX, because his franchise was acquired by Murciélagos F.C.
- Murciélagos F.C. started to playing in Ascenso MX, for that reason, Murcielágos Liga Premier team become a reserve team called Murciélagos F.C. B.
- Cachorros UdeG rejoined in the tournament.
- Petroleros de Veracruz, C.D. Tepatitlán de Morelos and Athletic Club Morelos, joined the league as expansion teams.
- Atlético Coatzacoalcos, Atlético Chiapas and Toros Neza had dissolved.
- Loros UdeC played this season on Liga Premier, waiting to meet the requirements to compete in the Ascenso MX, after winning the 2014–15 season.
- Mineros de Fresnillo F.C., champion of the Liga de Nuevos Talentos, remains in that category to not meet the requirements to promote.
- C.D. Uruapan, champion of the Tercera División, played in the Liga de Nuevos Talentos, by not meeting the requirements for Liga Premier.

=== Group 1 ===
Location of teams in the 2015–16 LPA Group 1

Club	City	Stadium	Capacity
Alacranes de Durango	Durango City, Durango	Francisco Zarco	18,000
Cimarrones "B"	Hermosillo, Sonora	Héctor Espino	15,000
Coras "B"	Tepic, Nayarit	Olímpico Santa Teresita	4,000
Dorados Premier	Culiacán, Sinaloa	Banorte	20,108
Dorados Fuerza UACH	Chihuahua City, Chihuahua	Olímpico Universitario José Reyes Baeza	22,000
Indios UACJ	Ciudad Juárez, Chihuahua	Olímpico Benito Juárez	19,703
Monterrey Premier	Santiago, Nuevo León	El Barrial	570
Murciélagos "B"	Guamúchil, Sinaloa	Coloso del Dique	5,000
Reynosa	Reynosa, Tamaulipas	Unidad Deportiva Solidaridad	20,000
Santos Laguna Premier	Torreón, Coahuila	TSM External Field 5	1,000
Santos de Soledad	Soledad de Graciano Sánchez, San Luis Potosí	Unidad Deportiva 21 de Marzo	8,000
Tigres Premier	General Zuazua, Nuevo León	Instalaciones de Zuazua	800
Tijuana Premier	Tijuana, Baja California	Caliente	27,333
Tuzos UAZ	Zacatecas City, Zacatecas	Francisco Villa	14,000
Zacatecas "B"	Zacatecas City, Zacatecas	Francisco Villa	14,000

=== Group 2 ===
Location of teams in the 2015–16 LPA Group 2

Club	City	Stadium	Capacity
Atlas Premier	Zapopan, Jalisco	Alfredo "Pistache" Torres	3,000
Atlético Estado de México	Cuautitlán Izcalli, State of Mexico	Hugo Sánchez Márquez	3,500
Cachorros UdeG	Zapopan, Jalisco	Club La Primavera / Jalisco	3,000 / 55,020
Cruz Azul Hidalgo	Jasso, Hidalgo	10 de Diciembre	7,761
Guadalajara Premier	Zapopan, Jalisco	Verde Valle	800
Irapuato	Irapuato, Guanajuato	Sergio León Chávez	25,000
León Premier	León, Guanajuato	Casa Club León	1,000
Loros UdeC	Colima City, Colima	Estadio Olímpico Universitario de Colima	11,812
Morelia Premier	Morelia, Michoacán	Morelos Adjacent Field	1,000
Pachuca Premier	San Agustín Tlaxiaca, Hidalgo	Universidad del Fútbol	1,000
Potros UAEM	Toluca, State of Mexico	Alberto "Chivo" Córdoba	32,603
Querétaro Premier	Querétaro City, Querétaro	Corregidora	33,070
Real Cuautitlán	Cuautitlán, State of Mexico	Los Pinos	5,000
Tepatitlán	Tepatitlán de Morelos, Jalisco	Gregorio "Tepa" Gómez	12,500
Toluca	Metepec, State of Mexico	Instalaciones de Metepec	1,000

=== Group 3 ===
Location of teams in the 2015–16 LPA Group 3

Club	City	Stadium	Capacity
Albinegros de Orizaba	Orizaba, Veracruz	Socum	7,000
América Premier	Coyoacán, Mexico City	Instalaciones Club América	1,000
Athletic Club Morelos	Cuernavaca, Morelos	Centenario	14,800
Atlético Veracruz	Texcoco, State of Mexico	Claudio Suárez	4,000
Chapulineros	Oaxaca City, Oaxaca	Tecnológico de Oaxaca	14,598
Chiapas Premier	Tuxtla Gutiérrez, Chiapas	Field 2 Zoque VMR	1,000
Cruz Azul Premier	Jasso, Hidalgo	10 de Diciembre	7,761
Inter Playa	Playa del Carmen, Quintana Roo	Unidad Deportiva Mario Villanueva Madrid	7,500
Ocelotes UNACH	San Cristóbal de las Casas, Chiapas	Municipal de San Cristóbal de las Casas	4,000
Petroleros de Veracruz	Boca del Río, Veracruz	Unidad Deportiva Hugo Sánchez	2,500
Pioneros de Cancún	Cancún, Quintana Roo	Andrés Quintana Roo	17,289
Puebla Premier	Puebla City, Puebla	Unidad Deportiva Mario Vázquez Raña	800
Tampico Madero	Tampico Madero, Tamaulipas	Tamaulipas	19,667
Tlaxcala	Tlaxcala City, Tlaxcala	Tlahuicole	7,000
UNAM Premier	Coyoacán, Mexico City	La Cantera	2,000
Veracruz Premier	Coatzacoalcos, Veracruz	Rafael Hernández Ochoa	4,800

=== Regular season ===
==== Group 1 ====
===== Standings =====
Pos	Team	Pld	W	D	L	GF	GA	GD	Pts	Qualification
1	Zacatecas "B"	14	9	3	2	27	12	+15	31	Advance to Liguilla
2	Tigres Premier	14	7	5	2	24	14	+10	28	Advance to Liguilla de Filiales
3	Tuzos UAZ	14	6	7	1	19	12	+7	26	
4	Cimarrones "B"	14	6	4	4	21	19	+2	23	
5	Reynosa	14	6	3	5	17	16	+1	23	
6	Santos Laguna Premier	14	6	2	6	19	20	−1	21	
7	Murciélagos "B"	14	4	6	4	14	15	−1	21	
8	Monterrey Premier	14	5	5	4	14	12	+2	20	
9	Dorados Fuerza UACH	14	4	5	5	17	20	−3	18	
10	Tijuana Premier	14	5	2	7	17	22	−5	17	
11	Santos de Soledad	14	5	0	9	16	19	−3	16	
12	Alacranes de Durango	14	3	6	5	21	26	−5	16	
13	Indios UACJ	14	3	5	6	18	21	−3	15	
14	Dorados Premier	14	4	3	7	25	29	−4	15	
15	Coras "B"	14	3	2	9	10	22	−12	12	

Last updated on November 22, 2015.
Source: SoccerWay

===== Results =====
Home \ Away	ALD	CIM	COR	DOR	DFU	IUJ	MTY	MUR	REY	SAN	SSL	TIG	TIJ	UAZ	ZAS
Alacranes							1–1	3–3	0–2		3–0	2–2		1–2	4–4
Cimarrones	1–1		3–0					2–1	2–1			2–4		1–1	1–3
Coras	4–1							0–0	0–1		2–2	0–1		1–2	1–2
Dorados	3–2	1–1	5–0		2–3	2–2					3–2		2–1		
Dorados Fuerza UACH	0–0	0–1	0–1			1–1			2–2				3–1		2–0
Indios UACJ	0–1	4–2	2–0						1–4			1–1	1–1		0–1
Monterrey		3–1	0–1	2–1	4–2	0–1					1–0		2–0		
Murciélagos				3–1	0–0	1–1	0–0			0–3	1–0			0–0	
Reynosa				2–1			0–0	0–2		1–0	2–1	1–2		0–0	
Santos Laguna		0–3		3–0	0–1	2–1	0–0				1–3		2–3		
Santos de Soledad	0–1	0–1	1–0		3–2	2–1							3–0		0–1
Tigres				2–1	5–1		0–0	1–0		1–2	3–1			1–1	
Tijuana	4–1	0–0	2–0					1–3	2–1			1–0			1–2
Tuzos UAZ				2–2	0–0	3–2	2–1			2–3	2–0		2–0		
Zacatecas				4–1			3–0	3–0	3–0	0–1		1–1		0–0	

Updated to match(es) played on 22 November 2015. Source: SoccerWay
Legend: Blue = home team win; Yellow = draw; Red = away team win.

==== Group 2 ====
===== Standings =====
Pos	Team	Pld	W	D	L	GF	GA	GD	Pts	Qualification
1	Potros UAEM	14	10	2	2	29	10	+19	35	Advance to Liguilla
2	Cruz Azul Hidalgo	14	9	3	2	23	12	+11	33	Advance to Liguilla
3	Loros UdeC	14	9	3	2	26	8	+18	32	Advance to Liguilla
4	Tepatitlán	14	8	2	4	30	16	+14	30	Advance to Liguilla
5	Cachorros UdeG	14	6	2	6	25	22	+3	23	
6	Atlas Premier	14	6	4	4	17	14	+3	22	Advance to Liguilla de Filiales
7	Querétaro Premier	14	5	5	4	15	16	−1	22	Advance to Liguilla de Filiales
8	Morelia Premier	14	5	5	4	22	20	+2	21	Advance to Liguilla de Filiales
9	Irapuato	14	5	3	6	22	21	+1	21	
10	Atlético Estado de México	14	4	3	7	21	27	−6	17	
11	Guadalajara Premier	14	3	4	7	17	24	−7	15	
12	León Premier	14	3	4	7	16	22	−6	14	
13	Pachuca Premier	14	4	2	8	15	25	−10	14	
14	Toluca Premier	14	3	4	7	16	27	−11	14	
15	Real Cuautitlán	14	1	2	11	8	38	−30	5	

Last updated on November 22, 2015.
Source: SoccerWay

===== Results =====
Home \ Away	ATL	AEM	CUG	CRH	GDL	IRA	LEO	LUC	MOR	PAC	PUM	QRO	RCU	TEP	TOL
Atlas		2–1		1–2		2–1					0–1	1–1		2–2	3–1
AEM			0–0		2–4	1–3		0–3		2–3	1–1		2–1		4–1
Cachorros UdeG	0–1				3–1		0–3	3–1	1–2	3–0			4–0		
Cruz Azul Hidalgo		1–2	2–2			2–0						3–1		1–2	1–1
Guadalajara	1–2			0–1			1–1		1–1			0–0	1–1	2–5	
Irapuato			4–0		1–4		2–2	1–3		1–0	0–1		3–0		2–2
León	0–1	0–3		0–2					4–1		1–3	2–2		0–2	
Loros UdeC	0–0			1–2	3–1		2–0		1–1	4–0			3–0	1–0	
Monarcas Morelia	1–0	3–0		2–2		2–3					1–1	1–2		2–1	
Pachuca	1–1			0–1	0–1		1–2		3–2			0–1	2–1	2–1	
Potros UAEM			4–2	0–1	3–0			0–1		3–1		1–0		3–2	
Querétaro		2–2	0–3			2–1		0–0						0–1	1–0
Real Cuautitlán	2–1			0–2			0–0		1–3		0–4	1–3		0–6	
Tepatitlán		3–1	3–1			0–0									2–1
Toluca			1–3		1–0		2–1	0–3	0–0	2–2	0–4		4–1		

Updated to match(es) played on 22 November 2015. Source: SoccerWay
Legend: Blue = home team win; Yellow = draw; Red = away team win.

==== Group 3 ====
===== Standings =====
Pos	Team	Pld	W	D	L	GF	GA	GD	Pts	Qualification
1	Tlaxcala	15	11	3	1	32	7	+25	39	Advance to Liguilla
2	Tampico Madero	15	10	4	1	29	11	+18	37	Advance to Liguilla
3	América Premier	15	9	4	2	32	11	+21	31	Advance to Liguilla de Filiales
4	Pioneros de Cancún	15	8	3	4	25	17	+8	28	Advance to Liguilla
5	Chapulineros de Oaxaca	15	6	6	3	21	15	+6	28	
6	Puebla Premier	15	8	3	4	25	20	+5	28	Advance to Liguilla de Filiales
7	Chiapas Premier	15	7	2	6	22	19	+3	24	Advance to Liguilla de Filiales
8	UNAM Premier	15	6	5	4	24	20	+4	23	Advance to Liguilla de Filiales
9	Inter Playa del Carmen	15	4	7	4	16	16	0	19	
10	Athletic Club Morelos	15	4	5	6	22	29	−7	19	
11	Ocelotes UNACH	15	4	3	8	16	20	−4	16	
12	Cruz Azul Premier	15	4	2	9	21	22	−1	14	
13	Veracruz Premier	15	3	4	8	17	26	−9	14	
14	Albinegros de Orizaba	15	2	5	8	11	25	−14	11	
15	Petroleros de Veracruz	15	3	0	12	15	49	−34	9	
16	Atlético Veracruz	15	2	2	11	13	34	−21	8	

Last updated on November 21, 2015.
Source: SoccerWay

===== Results =====
Home \ Away	ALB	AME	ATH	AVE	CHA	CHI	CRP	INT	OUC	PET	PIO	PUE	TAM	TLA	UNM	VER
Albinegros				1–0			2–0		0–0	3–4	0–1	0–0	1–3	0–6		
América	5–2		2–0			3–0			6–0	6–0				2–1	2–0	
Athletic Morelos	0–0						2–0		2–0	5–3	2–1		0–3	1–3	2–2	
Atlético Veracruz		0–0	1–1		2–4	0–3		0–1			1–2	2–0				2–1
Chapulineros	2–1	0–1	1–1			1–0		1–1	1–1						0–0	
Chiapas	1–0		3–2						3–2	3–0	3–1		1–1	0–1	1–0	
Cruz Azul Premier		1–2		8–1	0–2	3–2		0–1			0–1	1–2				2–1
Inter Playa	1–1	0–0	4–0			0–0			1–4	2–0					0–0	
Ocelotes UNACH				2–0			1–1			3–0		1–2	0–1	0–1		2–0
Petroleros				2–1	0–3		0–3					0–4	1–3	0–3		3–1
Pioneros		0–0			2–2			3–0	1–0	3–0			2–1	1–1		4–1
Puebla		1–1	4–2		0–3	3–2		1–0			3–1				1–1	3–1
Tampico Madero		4–1		2–1	3–0		0–0	3–2				3–1				1–0
Tlaxcala				2–1	2–0		2–0	1–1				2–0	0–0			3–1
UNAM	2–0			5–1			3–2		1–0	6–2	3–2		1–1	0–4		
Veracruz	0–0	2–1	2–2		1–1	2–0		2–2							2–0	

Updated to match(es) played on 21 November 2015. Source: SoccerWay
Legend: Blue = home team win; Yellow = draw; Red = away team win.

=== Regular-season statistics ===
==== Top goalscorers ====
Players sorted first by goals scored, then by last name.

Rank	Player	Club	Goals
1	(Mexico) Dante Osorio	Potros UAEM	12
2	(Mexico) Alfonso Sánchez	América Premier	11
2	(Mexico) Johan Mendivil	Dorados Premier	11
4	(Mexico) David Martínez Reyes	UNAM Premier	9
5	(Ecuador) Miguel Parrales	Cruz Azul Hidalgo	8
5	(Mexico) Gerardo Escobedo	Tigres UANL Premier	8
5	(Mexico) Jovanni Hurtado	Cachorros UdeG	8
8	(Mexico) Abraham Ávalos Ceja	Tampico Madero	7
8	(Mexico) Roger Valerio	Petroleros de Veracruz	7

Source: Liga Premier

=== Liguilla ===
==== Liguilla de Ascenso (Promotion Playoffs) ====
The four best teams of each group play two games against each other on a home-and-away basis. The higher seeded teams play on their home field during the second leg. The winner of each match up is determined by aggregate score. In the quarterfinals and semifinals, if the two teams are tied on aggregate the higher seeded team advances. In the final, if the two teams are tied after both legs, the match goes to extra time and, if necessary, a penalty shoot-out.

Quarter-finals
1	Tlaxcala (*)	1	3	4
8	Pioneros	3	1	4
4	Cruz Azul Hidalgo	0	0	0
5	Loros UdeC	0	1	1
2	Potros UAEM	2	3	5
7	Tepatitlán	0	1	1
3	Tampico Madero	1	4	5
6	Zacatecas "B"	1	0	1

Semi-finals
1	Tlaxcala	1	3	4
5	Loros UdeC	1	2	3
2	Potros UAEM	0	4	4
3	Tampico Madero	0	1	1

Final
1	Tlaxcala	0	0	0
2	Potros UAEM	0	1	1

(*) The team was classified by its position in the season table

==== Quarter-finals ====
The first legs was played on 25 and 26 November, and the second legs was played on 28 and 29 November 2015.

Team 1	Agg.	Team 2	1st leg	2nd leg
Tlaxcala	4–4	Pioneros de Cancún	1–3	3–1
Cruz Azul Hidalgo	0–1	Loros UdeC	0–0	0–1
Potros UAEM	5–1	Tepatitlán	2–0	3–1
Tampico Madero	5–1	Zacatecas "B"	1–1	4–0

===== First leg =====
25 November 2015	Zacatecas "B"	1–1	Tampico Madero	Zacatecas City, Zacatecas
11:00	Jiménez 83'	Report	Escobar 46'	Stadium: Unidad Deportiva Universitaria Norte; Attendance: 300

25 November 2015	Pioneros de Cancún	3–1	Tlaxcala	Cancún, Quintana Roo
15:00	Alemán 44'; Henneberg 51'; Tun 90'	Report	Torres 83'	Stadium: Estadio Andrés Quintana Roo; Attendance: 2,000

25 November 2015	Tepatitlán	0–2	Potros UAEM	Yahualica, Jalisco
16:00		Report	Osorio 42'; Gómez 87'	Stadium: Estadio Las Ánimas; Attendance: 200

26 November 2015	Loros UdeC	0–0	Cruz Azul Hidalgo	Colima City, Colima
16:00		Report		Stadium: Estadio Olímpico Universitario de Colima; Attendance: 2,000

===== Second leg =====
28 November 2015	Potros UAEM	3–1 (5–1 agg.)	Tepatitlán	Toluca, State of Mexico
15:00	Arriaga 26'; Osorio 59'; Ochoa 56'	Report	Navarro 1'	Stadium: Estadio Universitario Alberto "Chivo" Córdoba; Attendance: 4,000

28 November 2015	Tlaxcala	3–1 (4–4 agg.)	Pioneros de Cancún	Tlaxcala City, Tlaxcala
18:00	Guarch 41'; Gallardo 45'; Calderón 73'	Report	Rodríguez 27'	Stadium: Estadio Tlahuicole; Attendance: 5,500

28 November 2015	Tampico Madero	4–0 (5–1 agg.)	Zacatecas "B"	Tampico Madero, Tamaulipas
20:00	Ávalos 45', 79'; Escobar 55'; Reyes 60'	Report		Stadium: Estadio Tamaulipas; Attendance: 25,000

29 November 2015	Cruz Azul Hidalgo	0–1 (0–1 agg.)	Loros UdeC	Ciudad Cooperativa Cruz Azul, Hidalgo
12:00		Report	Soto 52'	Stadium: Estadio 10 de Diciembre; Attendance: 300

==== Semi-finals ====
The first legs was played on 2 December, and the second legs was played on 5 December 2015.

Team 1	Agg.	Team 2	1st leg	2nd leg
Tlaxcala	4–3	Loros UdeC	1–1	3–2
Potros UAEM	4–1	Tampico Madero	0–0	4–1

===== First leg =====
2 December 2015	Loros UdeC	1–1	Tlaxcala	Colima City, Colima
16:00	Soto 26'	Report	López 68'	Stadium: Estadio Olímpico Universitario de Colima; Attendance: 1,500

2 December 2015	Tampico Madero	0–0	Potros UAEM	Tampico Madero, Tamaulipas
20:45		Report		Stadium: Estadio Tamaulipas; Attendance: 25,000

===== Second leg =====
5 December 2015	Potros UAEM	4–1 (4–1 agg.)	Tampico Madero	Toluca, State of Mexico
15:00	Osorio 10', 88'; Rentería 59'; Gómez 84'	Report	Castellanos 41'	Stadium: Estadio Universitario Alberto "Chivo" Córdoba; Attendance: 4,800

5 December 2015	Tlaxcala	2–1 (3–2 agg.)	Loros UdeC	Tlaxcala City, Tlaxcala
18:00	Álvarez 24'; Olascoaga 90'	Report	Soto 83'	Stadium: Estadio Tlahuicole; Attendance: 6,000

==== Final ====
The first leg was played on 9 December, and the second leg was played on 12 December 2015.

Team 1	Agg.	Team 2	1st leg	2nd leg
Tlaxcala	0–1	Potros UAEM	0–0	0–1

===== First leg =====
9 December 2015	Potros UAEM	0–0	Tlaxcala	Toluca, State of Mexico
15:00		Report		Stadium: Estadio Universitario Alberto "Chivo" Córdoba; Attendance: 4,800

===== Second leg =====
12 December 2015	Tlaxcala	0–1 (0–1 agg.)	Potros UAEM	Tlaxcala City, Tlaxcala
18:00		Report	Osorio 70'	Stadium: Estadio Tlahuicole; Attendance: 5,000

Apertura 2015 winners:
Potros UAEM
2nd title

==== Liguilla de filiales (Reserve teams Playoffs) ====
Quarter-finals
1	América Premier (a)	2	1	2
8	Morelia Premier	1	1	2
3	Puebla Premier	2	2	4
6	Querétaro Premier	5	3	8
2	Tigres Premier	2	3	5
7	UNAM Premier	1	0	1
4	Chiapas Premier	1	1	2
5	Atlas Premier	1	0	1

Semi-finals
1	América Premier	0	1	1
6	Querétaro (a)	0	1	1
2	Tigres Premier	2	6	8
4	Chiapas Premier	2	0	2

Final
6	Querétaro Premier	1	1	2
2	Tigres Premier	3	3	6

Apertura 2015 winners (Reserve Teams):
Tigres Premier
1st title

== Torneo Clausura ==
=== Regular season ===
==== Group 1 ====
===== Standings =====
Pos	Team	Pld	W	D	L	GF	GA	GD	Pts	Qualification
1	Murciélagos "B"	14	8	2	4	27	17	+10	29	Advance to Liguilla
2	Reynosa	14	7	4	3	21	15	+6	29	Advance to Liguilla
3	Cimarrones "B"	14	5	6	3	32	17	+15	24	
4	Santos Laguna Premier	14	6	5	3	24	12	+12	24	Advance to Liguilla de Filiales
5	Zacatecas "B"	14	6	5	3	20	13	+7	24	
6	Indios UACJ	14	6	4	4	23	21	+2	23	
7	Monterrey Premier	14	6	5	3	15	17	−2	23	Advance to Liguilla de Filiales
8	Tigres Premier	14	4	8	2	19	17	+2	22	Advance to Liguilla de Filiales
9	Tijuana Premier	14	6	3	5	25	20	+5	21	Advance to Liguilla de Filiales
10	Santos de Soledad	14	4	4	6	19	29	−10	17	
11	Coras "B"	14	4	4	6	15	20	−5	16	
12	Alacranes de Durango	14	4	3	7	20	25	−5	15	
13	Tuzos UAZ	14	2	6	6	16	22	−6	14	
14	Dorados Fuerza UACH	14	4	0	10	17	27	−10	12	
15	Dorados Premier	14	2	3	9	15	36	−21	11	

Last updated on April 17, 2016.
Source: SoccerWay

===== Results =====
Home \ Away	ALD	CIM	COR	DOR	DFU	IUJ	MTY	MUR	REY	SAN	SSL	TIG	TIJ	UAZ	ZAS
Alacranes		2–0	3–1	1–3	5–3	0–2					4–1		0–1		
Cimarrones				8–0	2–0	5–0	1–2			1–1	1–1		2–2		
Coras		0–0		3–0	2–0	1–1	1–1				0–3		3–0		
Dorados							2–3	0–3	3–3	1–2		1–1		2–2	0–2
Dorados Fuerza UACH				4–1			2–1	1–0		0–1	3–0	2–3		0–3	
Indios UACJ				2–0	1–0		4–0	1–1		1–1	1–2			4–2	
Monterrey	0–0							2–1	0–4	1–0		0–0		0–0	2–0
Murciélagos	1–0	3–1	2–0						2–1			3–0	3–3		1–2
Reynosa	1–0	1–1	1–0		3–1	2–2							1–0		0–0
Santos Laguna	6–0		6–1					2–0	1–3			0–1		1–1	0–0
Santos de Soledad				0–1			1–1	3–4	2–0	2–2		1–1		1–0	
Tigres	1–1	3–3	0–1			3–2			3–0				2–2		1–1
Tijuana				2–1	3–1	3–0	1–2			0–1	7–1			1–0	
Tuzos UAZ	2–2	1–4	3–2					1–3	0–1			0–0			1–1
Zacatecas	3–2	1–3	0–0		2–0	1–2					4–1		3–0		

Updated to match(es) played on 17 April 2016. Source: SoccerWay
Legend: Blue = home team win; Yellow = draw; Red = away team win.

==== Group 2 ====
===== Standings =====
Pos	Team	Pld	W	D	L	GF	GA	GD	Pts	Qualification
1	Cruz Azul Hidalgo	14	10	1	3	33	12	+21	34	Advance to Liguilla
2	Tepatitlán	14	10	1	3	28	12	+16	33	Advance to Liguilla
3	Potros UAEM	14	8	5	1	22	7	+15	30	Advance to Liguilla
4	Irapuato	14	8	1	5	24	16	+8	28	
5	Guadalajara Premier	14	6	4	4	26	20	+6	25	Advance to Liguilla de Filiales
6	Loros UdeC	14	7	1	6	29	26	+3	25	
7	Pachuca Premier	14	6	3	5	17	21	−4	22	Advance to Liguilla de Filiales
8	Real Cuautitlán	14	5	5	4	18	20	−2	21	
9	Querétaro Premier	14	4	4	6	15	18	−3	17	
10	Cachorros UdeG	14	4	5	5	20	26	−6	17	
11	León Premier	14	4	2	8	21	24	−3	16	
12	Toluca Premier	14	5	1	8	14	24	−10	16	
13	Morelia Premier	14	4	2	8	18	27	−9	15	
14	Atlas Premier	14	4	2	8	17	26	−9	15	
15	Atlético Estado de México	14	1	1	12	12	35	−23	5	

Last updated on April 16, 2016.
Source: SoccerWay

===== Results =====
Home \ Away	ATL	AEM	CUG	CRH	GDL	IRA	LEO	LUC	MOR	PAC	PUM	QRO	RCU	TEP	TOL
Atlas			0–1		0–3		1–3	3–2		4–0			0–1		
AEM	0–1			0–2			1–3		3–4			0–1		0–4	
Cachorros UdeG		2–1		1–2		3–4					0–0	1–1		1–3	2–1
Cruz Azul Hidalgo	6–1				4–2		3–1	3–1	1–2	3–0	1–1		4–1		
Guadalajara		3–2	4–0			1–2		2–1		0–0	2–2				1–0
Irapuato	3–1	3–0		1–0					0–3			0–1		1–2	
León			2–3		4–2	0–2		3–2		1–1			0–1		1–2
Loros UdeC		4–1	3–3			0–4					1–0	2–1			5–1
Monarcas Morelia	1–4		3–1		2–4		1–1	0–3		0–1			2–2		0–1
Pachuca		2–0	1–1			2–0		1–2			0–2				2–1
Potros UAEM	2–0	4–0				0–0	2–1		2–0				0–0		3–0
Querétaro	0–0			0–2	1–1		2–1		3–0	1–2	0–1		2–2		
Real Cuautitlán		1–1	1–1		1–0	3–2		1–3		4–1					0–1
Tepatitlán	3–1			1–0	1–1		1–0	3–0	1–0	2–4	2–3	2–0	3–0		
Toluca	1–1	1–3		0–2		0–2						4–2		1–0	

Updated to match(es) played on 17 April 2016. Source: SoccerWay
Legend: Blue = home team win; Yellow = draw; Red = away team win.

==== Group 3 ====
===== Standings =====
Pos	Team	Pld	W	D	L	GF	GA	GD	Pts	Qualification or relegation
1	Tlaxcala	15	9	4	2	40	12	+28	34	Advance to Liguilla
2	Tampico Madero	15	8	6	1	23	8	+15	34	Advance to Liguilla
3	Pioneros de Cancún	15	8	4	3	33	12	+21	31	Advance to Liguilla
4	UNAM Premier	15	9	3	3	21	14	+7	31	Advance to Liguilla de Filiales
5	Inter Playa del Carmen	15	8	3	4	24	17	+7	29	
6	Atlético Veracruz	16	6	5	5	19	21	−2	27	
7	Chapulineros de Oaxaca	15	5	7	3	14	10	+4	23	
8	Albinegros de Orizaba	15	4	8	3	17	14	+3	22	
9	Cruz Azul Premier	15	5	5	5	21	25	−4	21	Advance to Liguilla de Filiales
10	Athletic Club Morelos	15	5	3	7	26	31	−5	20	
11	Ocelotes UNACH	15	4	4	7	17	22	−5	17	
12	Chiapas Premier	15	4	4	7	15	34	−19	17	
13	Veracruz Premier	15	4	4	7	15	34	−19	17	
14	América Premier	15	2	5	8	17	24	−7	11	
15	Puebla Premier	15	3	2	10	15	30	−15	11	
16	Petroleros de Veracruz	15	1	4	10	13	39	−26	7	Relegated to Liga de Nuevos Talentos

Last updated on April 17, 2016.
Source: SoccerWay

===== Results =====
Home \ Away	ALB	AME	ATH	AVE	CHA	CHI	CRP	INT	OUC	PET	PIO	PUE	TAM	TLA	UNM	VER
Albinegros		1–0	2–2		0–1	1–2		2–2							0–0	1–1
América				0–2	0–2		1–1	3–0			1–1	1–1	0–2			3–1
Athletic Morelos		3–2		0–3	1–1	3–0		2–0				3–1				0–2
Atlético Veracruz	0–3						2–0		2–1	4–2			1–1	0–3	0–3	
Chapulineros				1–1			0–0			3–0	1–1	3–1	0–2	1–0		0–0
Chiapas		1–0		0–0	0–0		1–6	1–5				3–1				2–2
Cruz Azul Premier	1–1		2–1						1–1				1–3	3–8	0–1	1–0
Inter Playa				0–2	2–0		4–1				2–1	3–1	0–0	0–0		2–1
Ocelotes UNACH	2–3	2–2	2–1		1–1	1–2		0–1			1–3				1–0	
Petroleros	0–0	1–1	2–5			0–0		2–3	1–0		1–7				2–3	
Pioneros	0–1		5–1	4–0		2–0	1–1					4–1			1–1	
Puebla	2–1			2–2			0–1		1–2	2–0			0–2	1–3		
Tampico Madero	0–0		2–2			4–0			2–0	3–1	0–2			2–1	0–0	
Tlaxcala	1–1	3–1	4–0			6–1			1–1	6–0	1–0				2–0	
UNAM		3–2	3–2		1–0	3–2		1–0				0–1				2–1
Veracruz				1–0			1–2		1–2	1–1	0–1	2–0	0–0	1–1		

Updated to match(es) played on 17 April 2016. Source: SoccerWay
Legend: Blue = home team win; Yellow = draw; Red = away team win.

=== Regular-season statistics ===
==== Top goalscorers ====
Players sorted first by goals scored, then by last name.

Rank	Player	Club	Goals
1	(Mexico) Luis Eduardo Rodríguez	Tlaxcala	18
2	(Mexico) Oscar Rai Villa	Cimarrones "B"	13
3	(Ecuador) Miguel Parrales	Cruz Azul Hidalgo	10
3	(Mexico) Lizandro Echeverría	Pioneros de Cancún	10
5	(Mexico) Dante Osorio	Pumas UAEM	9
5	(Mexico) William Guzmán	Guadalajara Premier	9
5	(Mexico) Roger Llergo	Inter Playa del Carmen	9
5	(Cuba) Yaudel Lahera	Cimarrones "B"	9

Source: Liga Premier

=== Liguilla ===
==== Liguilla de Ascenso (Promotion Playoffs) ====
The four best teams of each group play two games against each other on a home-and-away basis. The higher seeded teams play on their home field during the second leg. The winner of each match up is determined by aggregate score. In the quarterfinals and semifinals, if the two teams are tied on aggregate the higher seeded team advances. In the final, if the two teams are tied after both legs, the match goes to extra time and, if necessary, a penalty shoot-out.

Quarter-finals
4	Tampico Madero	1	4	5
5	Potros UAEM	1	0	1
1	Cruz Azul Hidalgo	1	2	3
8	Pioneros	3	1	4
3	Tlaxcala	0	1	1
6	Murciélagos "B"	2	1	3
2	Tepatitlán	0	-	0
7	Reynosa (*)	3	-	3

Semi-finals
4	Tampico Madero (+)	0	0	0
8	Pioneros	0	0	0
6	Murciélagos "B"	1	1	2
7	Reynosa	0	0	0

Final
4	Tampico Madero	2	0	2
6	Murciélagos "B"	0	0	0

(*) Reynosa was classified because Tepatitlán was eliminated by presenting an improper lineup
(+) Tampico Madero qualified for having better results in the regular season than his rival

==== Quarter-finals ====
The first legs was played on 20 and 21 April, and the second legs was played on 23 and 24 April 2016.

Team 1	Agg.	Team 2	1st leg	2nd leg
Tampico Madero	5–1	Potros UAEM	1–1	4–0
Cruz Azul Hidalgo	3–4	Pioneros de Cancún	1–3	2–1
Tlaxcala	1–3	Murciélagos "B"	0–2	1–1
Tepatitlán	0–3	Reynosa	0–3	–

===== First leg =====
20 April 2016	Reynosa	3–0	Tepatitlán	Reynosa, Tamaulipas
20:00	Galván 77'	Report		Stadium: Unidad Deportiva Solidaridad; Attendance: 9,000

20 April 2016	Murciélagos "B"	2–0	Tlaxcala	Guamúchil, Sinaloa
20:30	Félix 1'; Ramírez 63'	Report		Stadium: Estadio Alfredo Díaz Angulo; Attendance: 3,000

21 April 2016	Potros UAEM	1–1	Tampico Madero	Toluca, State of Mexico
16:00	Morales 73'	Report	González 53'	Stadium: Estadio Alberto "Chivo" Córdoba; Attendance: 4,500

21 April 2016	Pioneros de Cancún	3–1	Cruz Azul Hidalgo	Cancún, Quintana Roo
17:00	Echeverría 36'; Gómez 49'; Henneberg 50'	Report	Acevedo 42'	Stadium: Estadio Andrés Quintana Roo; Attendance: 4,300

===== Second leg =====
23 April 2016	Tlaxcala	1–1 (1–3 agg.)	Murciélagos "B"	Tlaxcala City, Tlaxcala
19:00	Rodríguez 54'	Report	Moreno 90'	Stadium: Estadio Tlahuicole; Attendance: 5,000

24 April 2016	Cruz Azul Hidalgo	2–1 (3–4 agg.)	Pioneros de Cancún	Ciudad Cooperativa Cruz Azul, Hidalgo
12:00	Pineda 38'; Hipólito 59'	Report	García 89'	Stadium: Estadio 10 de Diciembre; Attendance: 300

24 April 2016	Tampico Madero	4–0 (5–1 agg.)	Potros UAEM	Tampico - Madero, Tamaulipas
18:00	Meráz 10'; Segura 14'; Ávalos 38'; Escobar 51'	Report		Stadium: Estadio Tamaulipas; Attendance: 25,000

Not Played	Tepatitlán	– (0–3 agg.)	Reynosa
		Report

==== Semi-finals ====
The first legs was played on 28 April, and the second legs was played on 1 May 2016.

Team 1	Agg.	Team 2	1st leg	2nd leg
Tampico Madero	0–0	Pioneros de Cancún	0–0	0–0
Murciélagos "B"	2–0	Reynosa	1–0	1–0

===== First leg =====
28 April 2016	Pioneros de Cancún	0–0	Tampico Madero	Cancún, Quintana Roo
17:00		Report		Stadium: Estadio Andrés Quintana Roo; Attendance: 6,300

26 April 2016	Reynosa	0–1	Murciélagos "B"	Reynosa, Tamaulipas
20:00		Report	Moreno 19'	Stadium: Unidad Deportiva Solidaridad; Attendance: 12,000

===== Second leg =====
1 May 2016	Tampico Madero	0–0 (0–0 agg.)	Pioneros de Cancún	Tampico Madero, Tamaulipas
18:00		Report		Stadium: Estadio Tamaulipas; Attendance: 25,000

1 May 2016	Murciélagos "B"	1–0 (2–0 agg.)	Reynosa	Guamúchil, Sinaloa
20:30	Zavala 20'	Report		Stadium: Estadio Alfredo Díaz Angulo; Attendance: 2,000

==== Final ====
The first leg was played on 5 May, and the second leg was played on 8 May 2016.

Team 1	Agg.	Team 2	1st leg	2nd leg
Tampico Madero	2–0	Murciélagos "B"	2–0	0–0

===== First leg =====
5 May 2016	Murciélagos "B"	0–2	Tampico Madero	Guamúchil, Sinaloa
20:30		Report	Meráz 22'; Escobar 54'	Stadium: Estadio Alfredo Díaz Angulo; Attendance: 5,000

===== Second leg =====
8 May 2016	Tampico Madero	0–0 (2–0 agg.)	Murciélagos "B"	Tampico Madero, Tamaulipas
18:00		Report		Stadium: Estadio Tamaulipas; Attendance: 25,000

Clausura 2016 winners:
Tampico Madero
2nd title

==== Liguilla de Filiales (Reserve teams Playoffs) ====
The four best teams of each group play two games against each other on a home-and-away basis. The higher seeded teams play on their home field during the second leg. The winner of each match up is determined by aggregate score. In the quarterfinals and semifinals, if the two teams are tied on aggregate the higher seeded team advances. In the final, if the two teams are tied after both legs, the match goes to extra time and, if necessary, a penalty shoot-out.

Quarter-finals
1	UNAM Premier	3	1	4
8	Cruz Azul Premier	3	0	3
4	Monterrey Premier	1	1	2
5	Tigres Premier	1	2	3
2	Guadalajara Premier	1	4	5
7	Tijuana Premier	2	1	3
3	Santos Premier	2	1	3
6	Pachuca Premier	2	0	2

Semi-finals
1	UNAM Premier	1	4	5
5	Tigres Premier	2	1	3
2	Guadalajara Premier	1	2	3
3	Santos Premier	1	0	1

Final
1	UNAM Premier	1	3	4
2	Guadalajara Premier	1	2	3

Clausura 2016 winners (Reserve teams):
UNAM Premier
1st title

== Relegation Table ==
P	Team	Pts	G	Pts/G
1	Tlaxcala	73	30	2.4333
2	Cruz Azul Hidalgo	67	28	2.3929
3	Tampico Madero	71	30	2.3667
4	Potros UAEM	65	28	2.3214
5	Tepatitlán	63	28	3.1500
6	Loros UdeC	57	28	2.0357
7	Pioneros de Cancún	59	30	1.9667
8	Zacatecas "B"	55	28	1.9643
9	Reynosa	52	28	1.8571
10	UNAM Premier	54	30	1.8000
11	Tigres Premier	50	28	1.7857'
12	Murciélagos "B"	50	28	1.7857
13	Irapuato	49	28	1.7500
14	Chapulineros de Oaxaca	51	30	1.7000
15	Cimarrones "B"	47	28	1.6786
16	Santos Laguna Premier	45	28	1.6071
17	Inter Playa del Carmen	48	30	1.6000
18	Monterrey Premier	43	28	1.5357
19	Guadalajara Premier	40	28	1.4286
20	Tuzos UAZ	40	28	1.4286
21	Cachorros UdeG	40	28	1.4286
22	América Premier	42	30	1.4000
23	Querétaro Premier	39	28	1.3929
24	Chiapas Premier	41	30	1.3667
25	Indios UACJ	38	28	1.3571
26	Tijuana Premier	38	28	1.3571
27	Atlas Premier	37	28	1.3214
28	Athletic Morelos	39	30	1.3000
29	Puebla Premier	39	30	1.3000
30	Pachuca	36	28	1.2857
31	Morelia Premier	36	28	1.2857
32	Santos de Soledad	33	28	1.1786
33	Cruz Azul Premier	35	30	1.1667
34	Atlético Veracruz	34	30	1.1333
35	Alacranes de Durango	31	28	1.1071
36	Ocelotes UNACH	33	30	1.1000
37	Albinegros de Orizaba	33	30	1.1000
38	León Premier	30	28	1.0714
39	Toluca Premier	30	28	1.0714
40	Dorados Fuerza UACH	30	28	1.0714
41	Veracruz Premier	30	30	1.0000
42	Coras "B"	28	28	1.0000
43	Real Cuautitlán	26	28	0.9286
44	Dorados Premier	26	28	0.9286
45	Atlético Estado de México	22	28	0.7857
46	Petroleros de Veracruz	16	30	0.5333

Last updated: 17 April 2016
Source: Liga Premier FMF
P = Position; G = Games played; Pts = Points; Pts/G = Ratio of points to games played

== Promotion Final ==
The Promotion Final is a series of matches played by the champions of the tournaments Apertura and Clausura, the game is played to determine the winning team of the promotion to Ascenso MX. The first leg was played on 12 May 2016, and the second leg was played on 15 May 2016.

Team 1	Agg.	Team 2	1st leg	2nd leg
Tampico Madero	0–1	Potros UAEM	0–1	0–0

=== First leg ===
12 May 2016	Potros UAEM	1–0	Tampico Madero	Toluca, State of Mexico
16:00	Rentería 26'	Report		Stadium: Estadio Alberto "Chivo" Córdoba; Attendance: 17,000

=== Second leg ===
15 May 2016	Tampico Madero	0–0 (0–1 agg.)	Potros UAEM	Tampico Madero, Tamaulipas
18:00		Report		Stadium: Estadio Tamaulipas; Attendance: 25,000

2015-16 Liga Premier de Ascenso winners:
Potros UAEM
1st title

== See also ==
- 2015–16 Liga MX season
- 2015–16 Ascenso MX season
- 2015–16 Liga de Nuevos Talentos season
