= Mauro Mallorca =

Argentine footballer

Personal information
- Full name: Mauro Matías Mallorca
- Date of birth: 25 April 1996 (age 30)
- Place of birth: Temperley, Argentina
- Height: 1.68 m (5 ft 6 in)
- Position: Attacking midfielder

Youth career
- Temperley
- 2012–2015: River Plate

Senior career*
Years	Team	Apps	(Gls)
2016–2017	Cambaceres	43	(6)
2017	Fénix	4	(0)
2018–2019	JJ Urquiza	8	(0)
2019	Gavilanes de Matamoros		
2019	Gutiérrez SC		
- * Club domestic league appearances and goals

Mauro Matías Mallorca (born 25 April 1996) is an Argentine professional footballer who plays as an attacking midfielder.

== Career ==
Mallorca began in the youth ranks of Temperley, prior to being signed by River Plate in 2012. He never made the first-team of River Plate, departing in 2015 and subsequently joining Cambaceres of Primera C Metropolitana. He scored six goals in forty-three appearances over two seasons with Cambaceres. In August 2017, Mallorca joined Primera B Metropolitana side Fénix. He made his professional debut on 2 September versus Tristán Suárez, which was one of four appearances in 2017–18. He left midway through 2017–18 to play for JJ Urquiza in Primera C Metropolitana; departing after eight games.

After leaving JJ Urquiza, Mallorca had a four-month stint in Mexican football with fourth tier side Gavilanes de Matamoros before spending five months with Liga Mendocina team Gutiérrez SC.

== Personal life ==
In June 2020, during the COVID-19 pandemic, Mallorca appealed on social media for blood donations after his mother was put into intensive care after contracting the virus.

== Career statistics ==
As of 25 October 2020.

Club statistics
Club	Season	League			Cup		League Cup		Continental		Other		Total	
Club	Season	Division	Apps	Goals	Apps	Goals	Apps	Goals	Apps	Goals	Apps	Goals	Apps	Goals
Fénix	2017–18	Primera B Metropolitana	4	0	0	0	—		—		0	0	4	0
JJ Urquiza	2017–18	Primera C Metropolitana	8	0	0	0	—		—		0	0	8	0
Career total			12	0	0	0	—		—		0	0	12	0
