= Diego Pacheco =

Diego Pacheco may refer to:

- Diego Pacheco (footballer) (born 1995), Mexican footballer
- Diego Pacheco (boxer) (born 2001), American boxer
