= Diego Pacheco (footballer) =

Mexican footballer (born 1995)

Diego Alberto Pacheco Hernández (born 17 June 1995 in Queretaro) is a professional Mexican footballer who currently plays for C.F. Monterrey Premier.
