= Luis Olascoaga =

Mexican footballer (born 1991)

Personal information
- Full name: Luis Ernesto Olascoaga Reyes
- Date of birth: August 22, 1991 (age 35)
- Place of birth: Ciudad de Mexico, Mexico
- Height: 1.64 m (5 ft 5 in)
- Position: Forward

Youth career
- 2008–2009: América

Senior career*
Years	Team	Apps	(Gls)
2009–2014	América	3	(0)
2012–2013	→ Necaxa (loan)	21	(1)
2014	→ Zacatepec (loan)	10	(1)
2014–2015	BUAP	0	(0)
2015–2016	Tlaxcala	33	(1)
2016–2019	BUAP	51	(3)
2019	Loros UdeC	6	(0)
2020	Atlético Zacatepec	5	(0)
- * Club domestic league appearances and goals as of 20:23, 26 May 2020 (UTC)

Luis Ernesto Olascoaga Reyes (born 22 August 1991) is a Mexican footballer.
