= Estadio El Hogar =

Stadium in Mexico

- La Ola "The Wave"
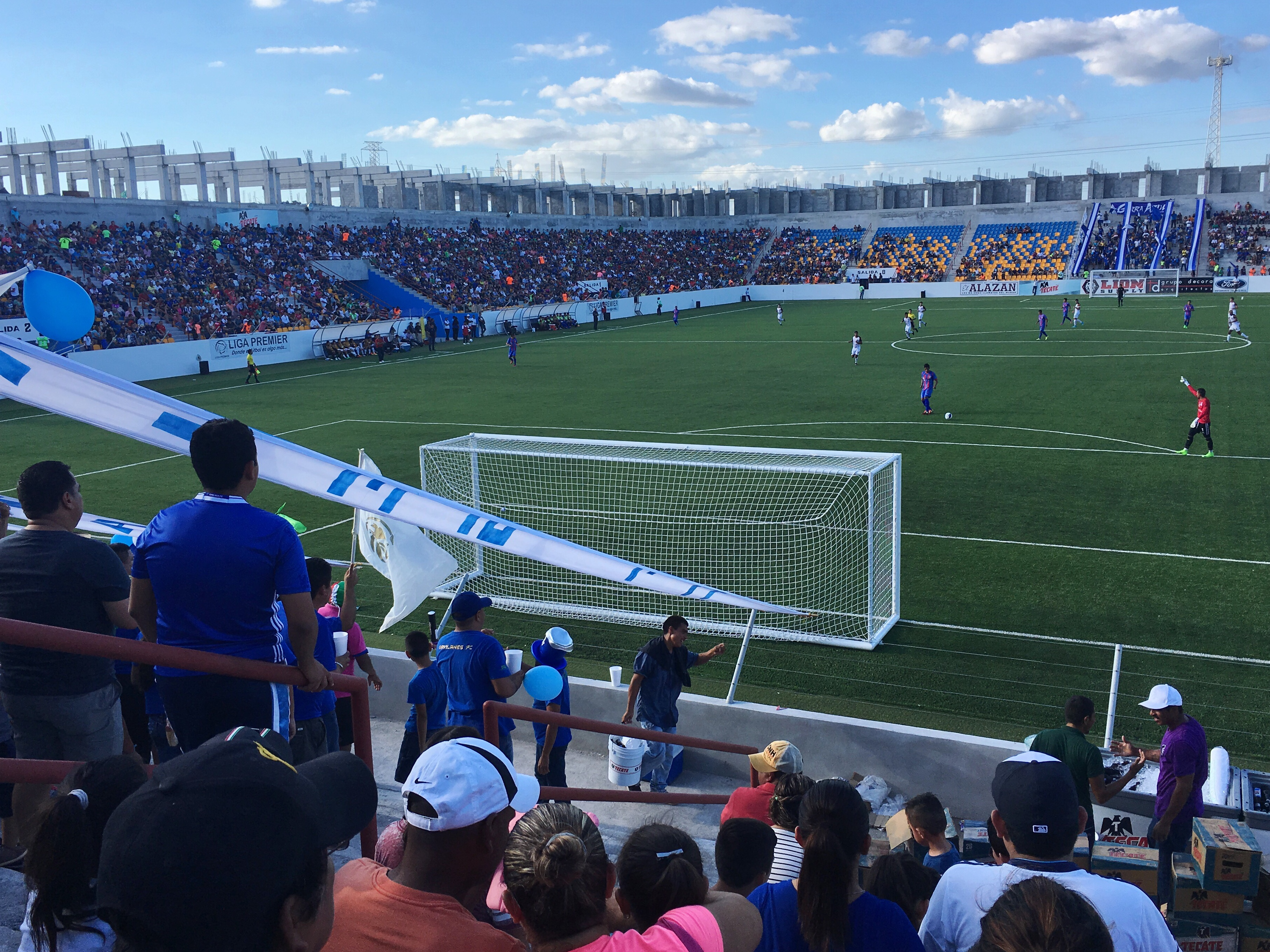
- under construction
- Interactive map of Estadio El Hogar
- Location: Matamoros, Tamaulipas, Mexico
- Coordinates: 25.820712°N 97.494269°W
- Capacity: 22,000
- Field size: 120 x 80 mts.

Construction
- Opened: 10 August 2016
- Architect: (Mexico) Alejandro Macías

Tenant
- Gavilanes de Matamoros (Serie A) (2016–2026)

Estadio El Hogar is a multi-purpose stadium in Matamoros, Tamaulipas, Mexico. It served as the home stadium of Liga Premier (Series A) football club Gavilanes de Matamoros. The stadium was inaugurated in 2017 and has a capacity of 22,000 spectators.

== History ==
The stadium was completed in time for the 2017–18 Liga Premier season, in which the Gavilanes were admitted to the third-tier league as an expansion team. On 19 August 2017, an inauguration ceremony was held before the team defeated Alacranes de Durango in their first Liga Premier home fixture with an attendance of about 16,000.

== Facilities ==
With a capacity of 22,000 people, it was the fourth largest stadium in northeastern Mexico at the time of its completion, behind only top-flight grounds.

The stadium has 4,000 parking spots, a training center, a panoramic restaurant and artificial lighting.
