= Tuxtla F.C. =

- Full name: Tuxtla Fútbol Club
- Nickname: Los Conejos (The Rabbits)
- Founded: 12 July 2017; 9 years ago
- Dissolved: 28 June 2019; 7 years ago
- Ground: Estadio Víctor Manuel Reyna; Tuxtla Gutiérrez, Chiapas
- Capacity: 29,001
- Chairman: Enrique Badillo
- League: Liga Premier - Serie A
- 2018-19: 3rd Group II - Quarterfinals
- Website: https://www.facebook.com/tuxtlafcoficial
Home colours	Away colours

Tuxtla F.C. was a Mexican football club from Tuxtla Gutiérrez, Chiapas that was active from July 12, 2017 to June 28, 2019 and competed in the Liga Premier - Serie A of the Segunda División de México, the third division level of Mexican football. They played their home team match games at the Estadio Víctor Manuel Reyna.

== History ==
After local team named Chiapas F.C. was dissolved in July 2017, Jiquipilas Valle Verde F.C. was moved from Jiquipilas to Tuxtla Gutiérrez and changed its name to Tuxtla F.C. It played in the Liga Premier–Serie A, the third tier of the Segunda División de México in the 2017/18 and 2018/19 seasons. In May 2019, Cafetaleros de Tapachula was moved to Tuxtla Gutiérrez and renamed Cafetaleros de Chiapas, so on June 28, 2019, Tuxtla F.C. was dissolved and their entry in the league was taken by a Cafetaleros reserve team.
