= Dante Osorio =

Mexican footballer (born 1993)

Personal information
- Full name: Dante Manuel Osorio Villanueva
- Date of birth: 7 August 1993 (age 33)
- Place of birth: Valle de Bravo, Mexico
- Height: 1.76 m (5 ft 9 in)
- Position: Forward

Youth career
- UAEM

Senior career*
Years	Team	Apps	(Gls)
2008–2019	UAEM	238	(142)
2018	→ Celaya (loan)	1	(0)
2020–2021	Correcaminos UAT	29	(4)
- * Club domestic league appearances and goals as of 2 March 2021

Dante Manuel Osorio Villanueva (Note: In this Spanish name, the first or paternal surname is Osorio and the second or maternal family name is Villanueva.) (born August 7, 1993) is a Mexican professional footballer who last played for Correcaminos UAT.
