= Halcones de Morelos =

Mexican football club

- Full name: Halcones de Morelos Fútbol Club
- Nickname(s): Los Halcones (The Falcons)
- Founded: 7 July 2017; 7 years ago
- Dissolved: 26 July 2018; 6 years ago
- Ground: Estadio Centenario, Cuernavaca, Morelos, Mexico
- Capacity: 14,800
- Owner: Giovani Gutiérrez
- Chairman: Giovani Gutiérrez
- Clausura 2018: 15th, Group II
Home colours	Away colours

The Halcones de Morelos Fútbol Club, commonly known as Halcones, was a Mexican football club based in Cuernavaca. The club was founded in 2017.

== Players ==
=== Current squad ===
Note: Flags indicate national team as defined under FIFA eligibility rules; some limited exceptions apply. Players may hold more than one non-FIFA nationality.

No. / Pos. / Nation / Player	No. / Pos. / Nation / Player
