= Estadio Centenario (Los Mochis) =

Football stadium in Los Mochis, Mexico

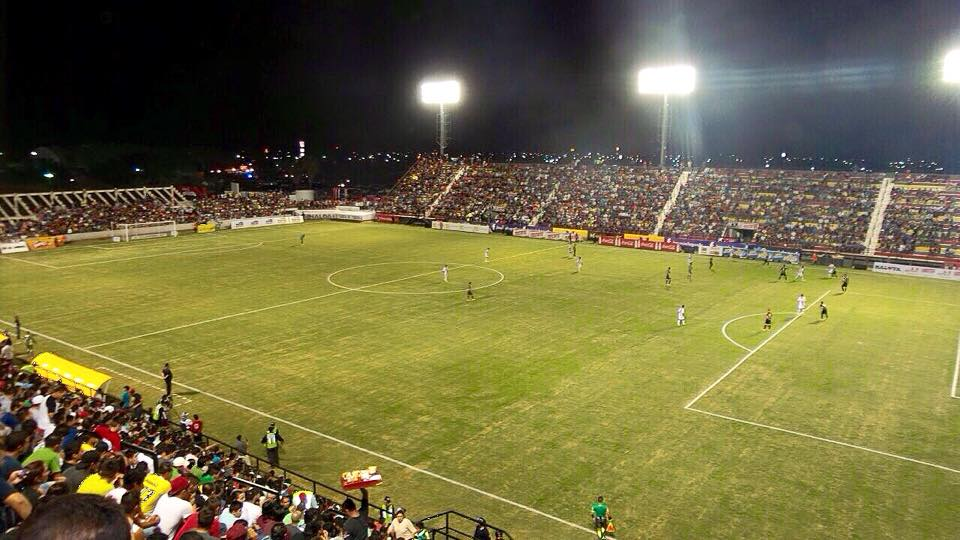
- Estadio Centenario Los Mochis
- Interactive map of Estadio Centenario
- Location: Los Mochis, Sinaloa
- Coordinates: 25°47′50.5″N 109°1′53.5″W
- Owner: Municipality of Ahome
- Capacity: 11,134
- Surface: Grass
- Field size: 120x90

Construction
- Built: Early 2003
- Opened: August 2004; July 31, 2015
- Renovated: May 2014
- Expanded: May 2015

Tenants
- Tigres Los Mochis (2004–05); Santos Los Mochis (2012–14); Murciélagos (2015–2020); Pacific (2017–19)

Estadio Centenario is a multi-use stadium in Los Mochis, Sinaloa, Mexico. It is currently used mostly for football matches and is the home stadium for Murciélagos. The stadium has a capacity of 10,844 people. It was remodeled by Grupo Faharo for Murciélagos de Los Mochis to be played in the Ascenso MX and completed by the season opener a.k.a. Grand Re-Opening of the Stadium on July 31, 2015 against Atlante in Week 2 of Torneo Apertura 2015.

As of 2020 and April 2023, the stadium remains abandoned.

== Grand Reopening Match ==
31 July 2015 2	Murciélagos de Los Mochis	1 – 0	Atlante	Los Mochis, Sinaloa
22:00/21:00 (Local)				Stadium: Estadio Centenario Los Mochis
