= Pacific F.C. (Mexico) =

Defunct association football club in Mexico

Pacific
- Full name: Pacific Fútbol Club
- Founded: 15 June 2017; 8 years ago
- Dissolved: 18 July 2019; 6 years ago
- Ground: Estadio Teodoro Mariscal; Mazatlán, Sinaloa, Mexico
- Capacity: 16,000
- Owner: Grupo Faharo
- Chairman: Miguel Favela
- League: Liga Premier – Serie A
- Apertura 2017: 17th, Group I
Home colours	Away colours

The Pacific Fútbol Club, commonly known as Pacific, was a Mexican football club based in Mazatlán, Sinaloa. The club was founded on 2017 and played in Liga Premier – Serie A. In 2019, the club went on a hiatus, before being officially dissolved in 2020, following the club not being reactivated in the period allowed by league regulations, as well as the creation of Mazatlán F.C., which plays in the Liga MX, fulfilling the initial goal of Pacific to bring professional football to the city.

== History ==
In June 2017, the board of Murciélagos F.C. decided to rename his reserve team, Murciélagos F.C. Club B, as Pacific F.C., in this way the team was enabled to seek promotion to the Ascenso MX. Also, it was determined that the new club would be based in Mazatlán instead of Guamúchil, Sinaloa. The change of venue included the construction project of a football stadium in the city.

On August 13, 2017, Pacific F.C. played his first match, being defeated by 0-2 against Santos Laguna Premier. In the first season, Pacific F.C. played in the Estadio Centenario in Los Mochis, awaiting the construction of its new ground in Mazatlán. The team remained at Los Mochis until February 2019.

At the end of November 2018, Pacific F.C. and Venados de Mazatlán signed an agreement, in which, the baseball team would help in the process of marketing and promotion of the football club, in addition to formalizing the relocation of the team to the city.

On February 16, 2019, Pacific F.C. played its first match in Mazatlán, playing their matches at Estadio Teodoro Mariscal, which belongs to Venados.

In July 2019, it was announced that Pacific would not participate in the 2019–2020 season of the Serie A with the club going on a hiatus, this with the aim of restructuring the club and entering into negotiations with other franchises to obtain a place in the Ascenso MX.

For the 2020–2021 season the team was not reactivated, due to financial problems that led to the departure of Murciélagos F.C., a club owned by the same owner, in addition to the creation of the Mazatlán F.C. franchise that plays in Liga MX, after the relocation of Monarcas Morelia to the city, founded with the original goal of the Pacific, which was to bring a professional soccer team to the port of Mazatlán. In the following year, the club did not reactivate its franchise either, which is why it was considered the disappearance of the club as the time allowed for the reactivation of the frozen franchise before the FMF had expired.
