= Club Tijuana Premier =

Mexican football club

Tijuana Premier
- Full name: Club Tijuana Xoloitzcuintles de Caliente Premier
- Nicknames: Los Xolos (The Xolos); Los Rojinegros (The Red-and-Blacks); El Xolaje (The Xolos-Crowd in Mexican Spanish); La Jauría (The Pack of Dogs); Los Perros Aztecas (The Aztec Dogs)
- Founded: 14 July 2015; 10 years ago
- Dissolved: 2018; 7 years ago
- Ground: CAR Tijuana; Tijuana, Baja California, Mexico
- Capacity: 1,000
- Owner: Grupo Caliente
- Chairman: Jorge Hank Inzunsa
- League: Liga Premier - Serie A
- Apertura 2017: Preseason
- Website: http://www.xolos.com.mx/
Home colours	Away colours

The Club Tijuana Xoloitzcuintles de Caliente Premier played in the Liga Premier in Tijuana, Baja California, Mexico, and were the official reserve team for Club Tijuana. The games were held in the city of Tijuana in the CAR Tijuana.
