= Gavilanes de Matamoros =

Mexican football club

- Full name: Gavilanes de Matamoros Fútbol Club
- Nickname: Los Gavilanes (The Red-tailed hawks)
- Founded: August 2011; 15 years ago
- Ground: Estadio El Hogar; Matamoros, Tamaulipas
- Capacity: 22,000
- Owner: Juan Alberto García
- Chairman: Juan Alberto García
- Manager: Vacant
- League: Liga Premier (Serie A)
- 2025–26: Regular phase: 6th (Group II); Final phase: Did not qualify
- Website: gavilanesfc.com
Home colours	Away colours

Gavilanes de Matamoros Fútbol Club, simply known as Gavilanes, is a Mexican professional football club based in Matamoros, Tamaulipas, that competes in the Liga Premier - Serie A, the third level division of Mexican football.

== History ==
The team was founded in August 2011, taking the place of the team Hogar de Matamoros. It played its first match in the Tercera División de México on August 21, 2011 against Orinegros de Ciudad Madero, the final score was 1–0 in favor of Orinegros. On August 26, the club was officially presented by Horacio García, with Jorge Alberto Hinojosa being the team's first technical director.

In August 2017, Gavilanes de Matamoros began to participate in the Serie A of the Segunda División de México, after acquiring an expansion franchise.

On July 1, 2026, the team went on hiatus due to financial problems, although maintaining the possibility of returning to participate in the future, only if conditions improve.

== Players ==
=== Current squad ===
As of January 12, 2026.

Note: Flags indicate national team as defined under FIFA eligibility rules; some limited exceptions apply. Players may hold more than one non-FIFA nationality.

No.	Pos.	Nation	Player
1	GK	MEX	Carlos Venzor
2	DF	MEX	Ramón Cano
3	DF	MEX	Francisco Macías
4	DF	MEX	Jacobo Rosas
5	MF	MEX	Horacio García
7	MF	MEX	Roberto Salazar
8	MF	MEX	Eider Velázquez
9	MF	MEX	Dilan Donato
10	FW	MEX	Miguel Zapata
11	FW	MEX	Víctor Villanueva
12	MF	MEX	Alessandro Lara
13	FW	COL	Yomar Rentería
15	DF	MEX	Agustín Méndez

No.	Pos.	Nation	Player
16	MF	MEX	Érick Pérez
17	FW	MEX	Kevin Zavala
18	MF	MEX	Aarón Ruiz
19	DF	MEX	Roberto Suárez
20	DF	MEX	Alexander Arias
22	DF	MEX	Abraham Reyes
23	GK	MEX	Carlo García
24	DF	MEX	Antonio Márquez
26	MF	MEX	Omar González
29	FW	MEX	Mario Martínez
30	MF	MEX	Alexis Villarreal
41	DF	MEX	Josué Arana
