= Loros UdeC =

- Full name: Club de Fútbol Loros de la Universidad de Colima
- Nickname: Los Loros (The Parrots)
- Founded: 8 October 1981; 45 years ago (first time); 25 August 2026; 46 days ago (refoundation)
- Dissolved: 27 December 2019; 6 years ago
- Ground: Estadio Olímpico Universitario de Colima; Colima, Colima
- Capacity: 11,812
- Owner: University of Colima
- Chairman: Christian Torres Ortiz Zermeño
- Manager: Cristian Aguirre
- League: Liga TDP
- 2026–27: Pre–season
Home colours	Away colours	Third colours

Club de Fútbol Loros de la Universidad de Colima, simply known as Loros de UdeC, is a Mexican football club based in the city of Colima, Colima, that competes in the Liga TDP, the fourth level division of Mexican football.

The team participated in the Liga de Ascenso de México during the 2016–17 season after earning promotion by winning the Clausura 2015 Championship tournament over Cruz Azul Hidalgo and the Final de Ascenso against U.A. Estado de México (winners of Apertura 2014). They were initially going to get promoted during the 2015–2016 season, but they did not meet the stadium requirements set forth by the Federación Mexicana de Fútbol (FMF).

In 2019, they returned to the Liga de Ascenso after two years playing in the Segunda División de México, the third level division of Mexican football. However, on December 27, 2019, the team was dissolved after Jimmy Goldsmith's death, the businessman had been the owner since 2008 and his family had no interest in keeping the club alive, which meant its dissolution.

On August 25, 2026 the team was re-established following an agreement between the University of Colima and an association of construction entrepreneurs; it was enrolled in the Liga TDP, the Mexican fourth division, but due to regulatory requirements, the club was registered as ACF Acatlán, as that was the franchise used to revive the Loros.

== History ==
The team originated in the Tercera División de México, debuting on September 10, 1981, playing their matches in Manzanillo, Colima until that year when the University of Colima acquired the Estadio San Jorge at a price of 400 million pesos, which would become the team headquarters. They would position themselves in the top positions during their debut season.

In the 1981-82 tournament from August to May, Loros de UdeC finished first in their group, which gave them the right to play the playoffs for promotion to the Segunda División de México and were the runner-ups; therefore, the team was invited to join the category of the Segunda División in Group B, but declined the invitation for economic reasons.

The team participated in a quadrangular hosted in Cihuatlán, Jalisco during the league championship of 1982–83. During this time one of their players was called to participate as a starter in the forward position of the Mexican College Football team that represented Mexico City in the University World Championship. In the campaign of 1985, a Loros team coached by Héctor "Chale" Hernández enjoyed an undefeated run that ended after 3 loses. "Chale" Hernández died on June 18, 1984, after suffering a car accident traveling to the city of Colima. Hernández was the only one to perish in the crash.

In professional sports, the University of Colima participated in the championship of the Federación Mexicana de Fútbol, 1986–1987, remaining in second place in their group, which won them the right to go to the tournament "Liguilla de Ascenso".

In 1991, the University of Colima ceded the franchise for two years to "Club Deportivo Colimense" by a sum of 150 million pesos. The club was nicknamed "Palmeros", winning the tournament from 1992 to 1993. The contract was extended for several years, changing the team name to simply "Palmeros de Colima" in the 1990s.

After an agreement with the State Government, the University of Colima and state administration shared the franchise Palmeros de Colima with fifty percent ownership for each. Later it was announced that the Palmeros would be called Palmeros-Loros, playing in Segunda División de México and being coached by famed ex-player François Omam-Biyik. The team was called Palmeros-Loros until governor Silverio Cavazos ceded the state's fifty percent stake in the franchise. It was then renamed Loros de la Universidad de Colima. This change led to Ernesto Santana being designated as coach, who was remembered as one of the pillars of the successful 80's Loros teams led by coach Héctor Hernández.

In 2008, with support from entrepreneur Jimmy Goldsmith, Atlético Cihuatlán, who had been champion of the Clausura 2007 tournament of the Tercera División de México and thus had gained promotion, merged with Loros de Colima, with Octavio Mora as coach. Loros then created a parallel "reserve club" composed of young footballers from Colima, this team was coached by José Ernesto Santana Díaz and had the objective of nurturing the main squad. The official club supporter group was called "La Kotorra".

They played their first Final in the Segunda División in the Apertura 2008, facing Mérida F.C. Loros had taken a 1–0 lead in the first leg held in Yucatán, but lost 2–1 in the second leg home game. Mérida won 3–2 on penalties. During this season Loros scored 41 points and finished as league leaders. They also finished as the best offense in the tournament, with 47 goals and were the best defense in the Northern Zone.

Upon completion of the Clausura 2012, despite having qualified for the playoffs, team president decided not to play, claiming that the team hadn't won a game during the end of the tournament, garnering only 4 of 15 disputed points. All players had their contracts terminated and a rumor of the sale of the franchise began to spread. On 15 May 2012 the University of Colima and the Club presented a project for the Apertura 2012, where the team would be made up entirely of players born in the state of Colima.

A year after the new project launched, Loros played its second Final in the Segunda División, this time facing Linces de Tlaxcala in the Apertura 2013. Loros had taken a 3–1 lead in the first leg held in Colima, but Linces won the second leg 2–0, tying the aggregate at 3-3 and forcing penalties. Linces won the penalty shutout 8–7. During the Apertura 2013, Loros was the team with the most points (35) and was leader of Group 2, but due to the percentage system used, ended up in 2nd place of the league table. Strikers Jorge "El Perico" Amador and Juan Carlos Martínez were 1st and 2nd place respectively in goal scoring during the tournament.

On May 9, 2015, Loros reached the final of the Segunda División de México for the third time, winning the Clausura 2015 title after defeating Cruz Azul Hidalgo 3–2 on aggregate. In the first leg, Cruz Azul Hidalgo took a 2–1 lead in Ciudad Cooperativa Cruz Azul, Hidalgo; but in the second leg Loros won 1–0 in regular time, forcing the match into extra time where Loros scored twice, securing the championship and the opportunity to play the final for promotion against Potros UAEM, the Apertura 2014 champions. During the Clausura 2015, Loros were runner-up in points, with 26. Striker Juan Carlos "El Cremas" Martínez finished as runner-up scorer with 13 goals.

On May 16, 2015, Loros was crowned champion after winning the 2014–2015 Championship with a score of 3–1 against Potros UAEM and thus obtained their promotion to the Liga de Ascenso de México. In the first leg in the State of Mexico, Potros and Loros did not score, the return at the Estadio Olímpico Universitario de Colima saw Loros score 3 with two goals scored in quick succession in the final minutes of the first half.

Loros played the Apertura 2015 and Clausura 2016 in the Segunda División while the Estadio Olímpico Universitario was adapted to meet the conditions required by the Federación Mexicana de Fútbol to host games for the Ascenso MX and Copa MX. After a year of a wait, Loros finally played in the Liga de Ascenso. However, the team had a bad start in the first half of season, finishing in 17th place overall. On April 9, 2017, Loros was relegated back to the Segunda División after a Tampico Madero win over UDG the day after Loros lost to Zacatepec Siglo XXI. Less than a week later, Loros Colima won in front of their home crowd for the final time in the Liga de Ascenso against Atlante with a score of 3–1.

In May 2018, Loros won the Clausura 2018 tournament in the Segunda División, but were defeated by Tepatitlán in the promotion final. In May 2019, the team won their third Segunda División title and were promoted to the Liga de Ascenso after just two years in the third level division of Mexican football. However, on December 27, 2019, the team was dissolved after Jimmy Goldsmith's death, the club owner since 2008. His family expressed no desire to keep the team running which meant the dissolution of the franchise. Every player had their contract immediately terminated and became a free agent.

The sudden dissolution of the club was received with shock from fans, players and staff. Only 5 of 25 players managed to find a new team for the 2020 season, among them Víctor Mañón, Osciel de la Cruz and Miguel Guzmán. Goalkeeper Javier Morán described that the team had their last training session on December 21 (with Jimmy Goldsmith wishing them happy holidays and urging them to stay healthy). On December 23, Goldsmith died at the age of 86 and on Christmas Day players received a text message informing them that the club was dissolved and that there was "nothing anyone could do about it".

On August 25, 2026, the refoundation of the team was announced after an agreement between the University of Colima and an association of local construction workers, the team was enrolled in the Liga TDP, the fourth division of Mexican football, however, for regulatory reasons the team will compete with the name ACF Acatlán during the 2026–27 season.

== Stadium ==
Loros de la Universidad de Colima played their home matches at the Estadio Olímpico Universitario de Colima in the city of Colima, Colima. The stadium has a capacity for 11,812 people. It is owned by U. de C. and is located right next to the university's central campus in the city of Colima. Its surface is covered by natural grass. It was opened in 1994.

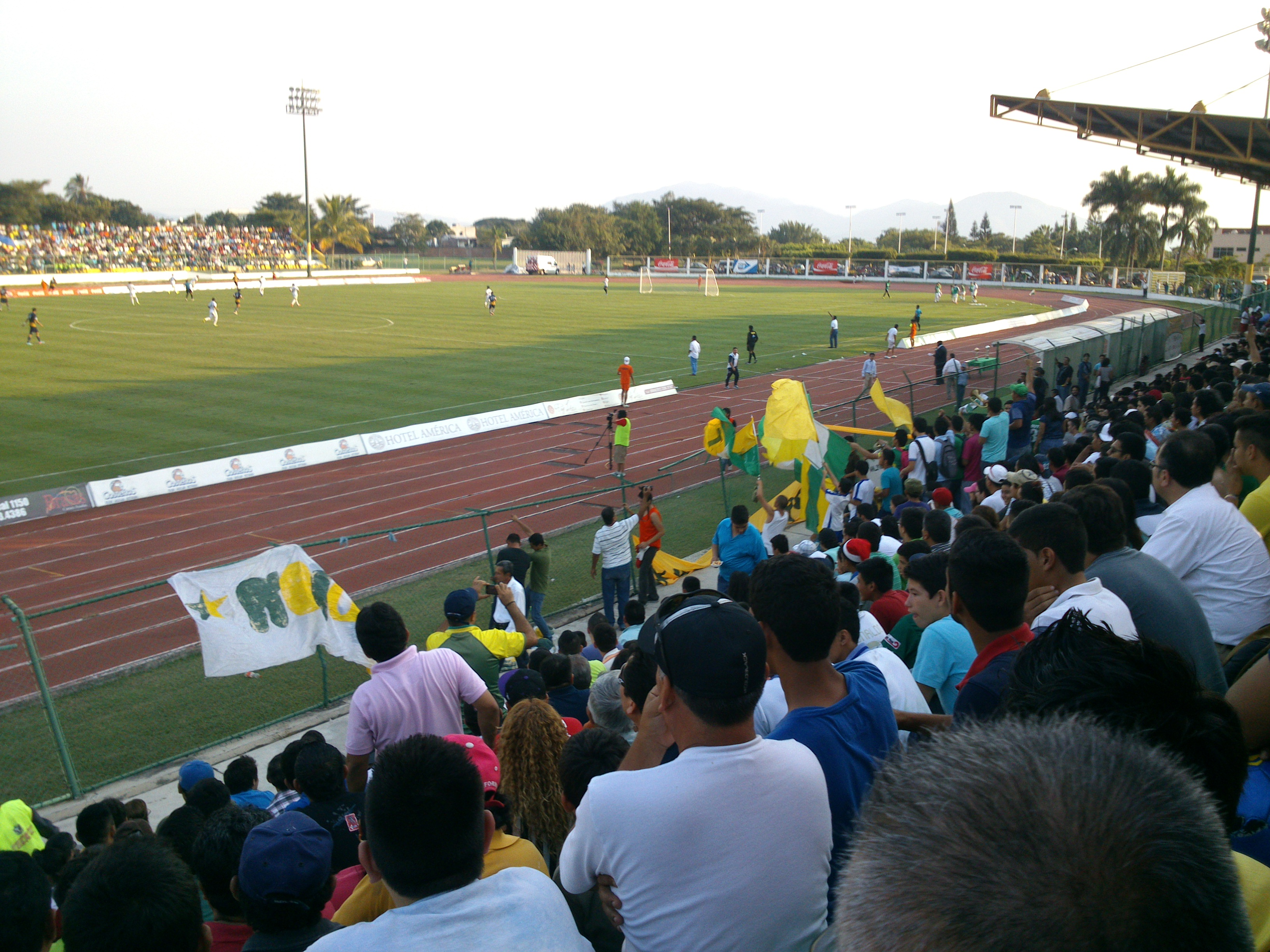
Estadio Olímpico Universitario hosting the Apertura 2013 final, Loros vs Linces.

== Players ==
=== Current squad ===
As of 9 January 2020

Note: Flags indicate national team as defined under FIFA eligibility rules; some limited exceptions apply. Players may hold more than one non-FIFA nationality.

No.	Pos.	Nation	Player

== Honours ==
- Segunda División de México (Serie A): 3

Clausura 2015, Clausura 2018, 2018-2019

- Segunda División de México Serie A (Final de Ascenso): 1

2014-2015

== See also ==
- Football in Mexico
