= Estadio Gregorio "Tepa" Gómez =

Multi-use stadium in Tepatitlán de Morelos, Jalisco, Mexico

Stadium "Tepa" Gómez
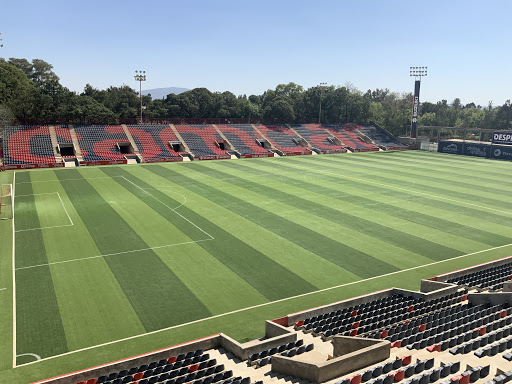
- Interactive map of Stadium "Tepa" Gómez
- Location: Tepatitlán, Jalisco, Mexico
- Coordinates: 20°48′55″N 102°46′4″W
- Owner: Tepatitlán City Council
- Operator: Tepatitlán F.C.
- Capacity: 8,085
- Surface: Natural turf

Construction
- Opened: July 1970
- Renovated: February 2016

Tenant
- Tepatitlán F.C. (1970–present)

The Stadium Gregorio "Tepa" Gómez is a multi-use stadium in Tepatitlán de Morelos, Jalisco, Mexico. It is currently used mostly for football matches and is the home stadium for Tepatitlán F.C. The stadium has a capacity of 8,085 people.

== History ==
It was built to house 3,000 spectators first; the name is in honor of former soccer player Gregorio Gómez † from Tepatitlán de Morelos; who played in Club Deportivo Guadalajara, Pumas de la UNAM and for the Mexican soccer team in the 50's and 60's.

Promotion matches were played in the 80s, s and 90s; to promote to the First Division A and to the Second Division; by the Tepatitlán Club.

Home of classics of the city between Club Tepatitlán vs Club de Fútbol Industrial de Tepatitlán in the Second Division in the 70's and 80's.

Currently headquarters of the Alteño classic in the Third Division between Club Tepatitlán vs Club Deportivo Aves Blancas.

== Opening ==
It was inaugurated in September 1970, with the match between Club Tepatitlán vs Guadalajara with a score of 0-3 in favor of Guadalajara, with 3,200 spectators.

With the presence of authorities from the Mexican Soccer Federation, the Municipal and State Government, in addition to the presence of Gregorio Gómez el "Tepa" † who was named in his honor the stadium, which together with the authorities cut the opening thread.

== Remodeling ==
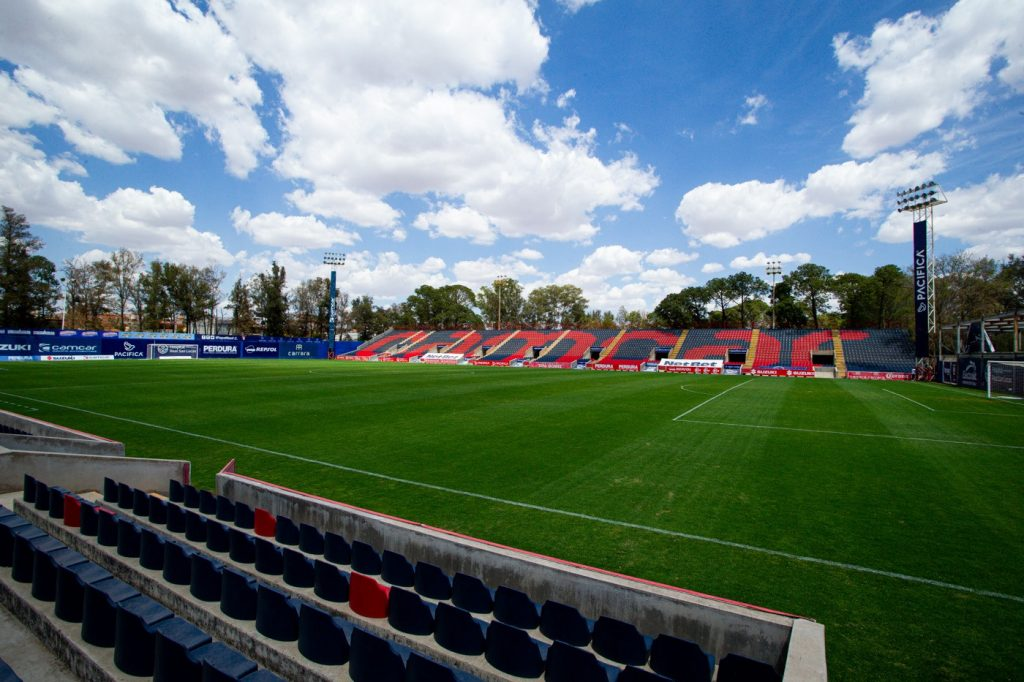
corner kick area

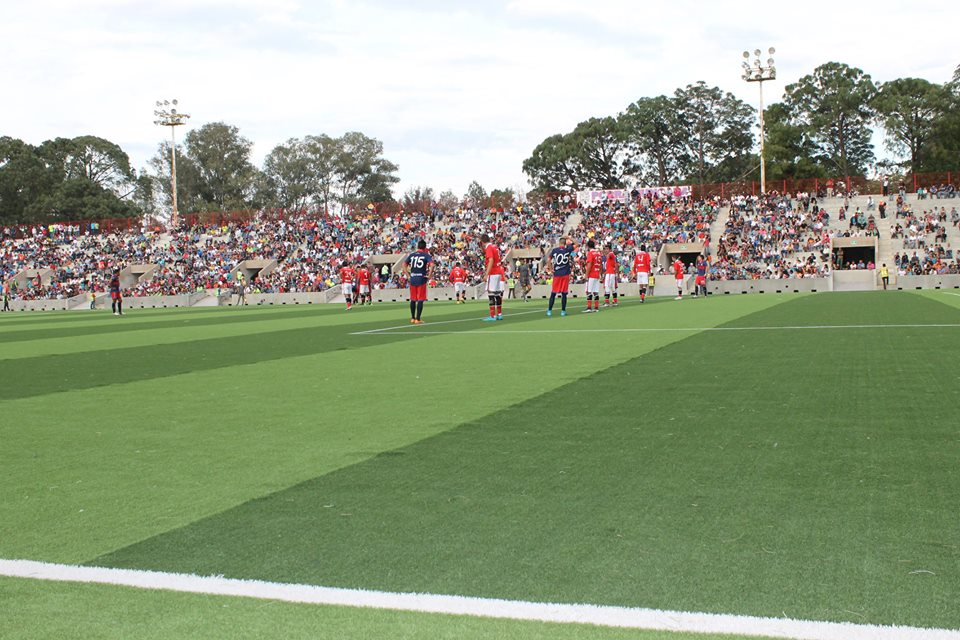
Second Division Match MX

At the end of August 2015; after the change of administration and directive; the municipal government cedes the facilities to begin the expansion and remodeling of the "Tepa" Gómez stadium, in order to expand to 12,500 spectators as the first stage.

The project consisted of the demolition of the (old) stadium, for the subsequent reconstruction and remodeling of Tepa Gómez, to increase its capacity to 15,400 fans; The goal was for the stadium to have shops, bathrooms, boxes, dressing rooms and seats; In addition, the grass was changed, using Artificial Grass. In February 2016, the new stage of the stage was inaugurated, with a match on matchday 7 of the Clausura Tournament against Cruz Azul Hidalgo.

In September 2019, the stadium lighting system was installed for the holding of night games. In October of the same year seating in the stadium was completed.

In December 2020, the works began to change the turf of the field because the artificial grass did not comply with the regulations of the Liga de Expansión MX, in February 2021 the placement of natural grass was completed.

== Technical details ==
- Grandstands: 12,500 people (first stage)
- Natural grass.
- 27 boxes (with capacity for 12 people all comfortably seated in an armchair) includes a box for Radio, TV, Press and a local sound booth.
- 12 well distributed entrance / exit doors.
- VIP zone.
- Area for People with Different Abilities.
- restrooms (Zone A sun stands, zone B north and south headers, general zone)
- Changing rooms: one for each team, and one for the referees
- Restaurant.
- Illumination.
- Snacks area.
- Roofed area.
- Parking area.
- Emergency area.

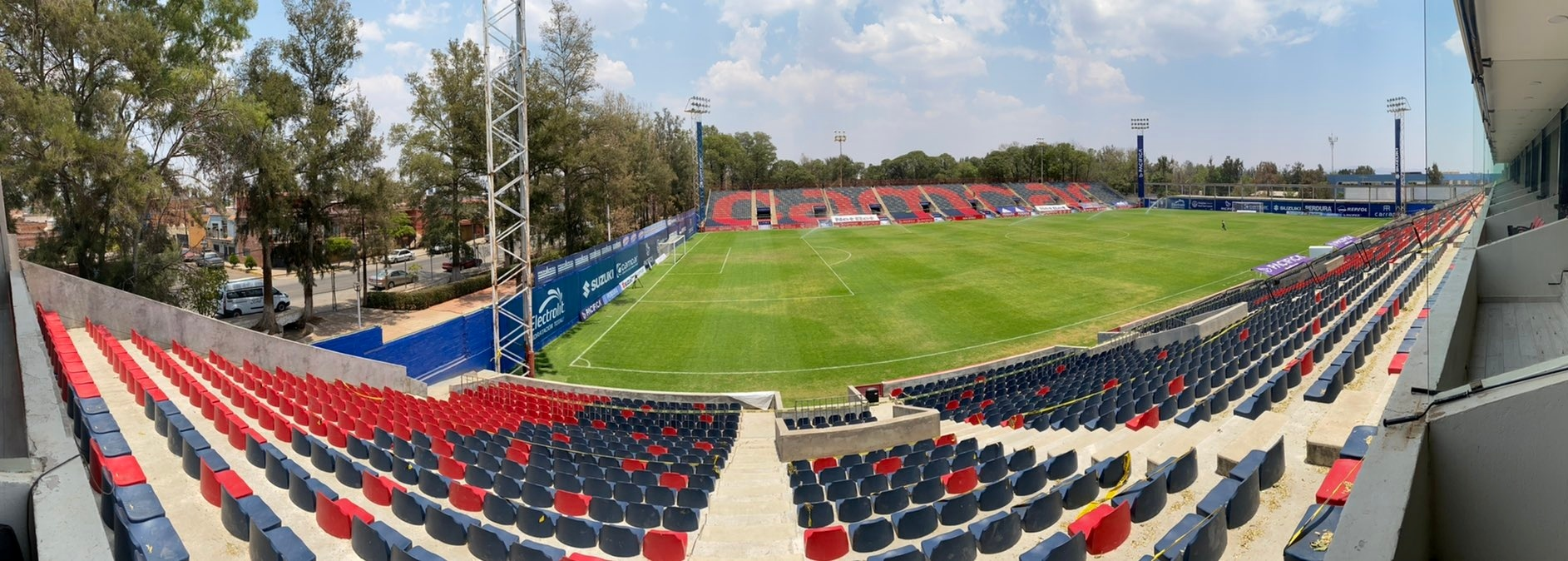
Panoramic view of the Tepa Gómez Stadium. Before the soccer game of Tepatitlán F.C.
