= Atlas F.C. Premier =

Atlas Premier
- Full name: Atlas Fútbol Club Premier
- Nicknames: Los Zorros (The Foxes); Los Rojinegros (The Red-and-Blacks); La Academia (The Academy)
- Founded: 14 July 2015; 11 years ago
- Dissolved: 2018; 8 years ago
- Ground: Estadio Alfredo "Pistache" Torres, Zapopan, Jalisco, Mexico
- Capacity: 3,000
- Owner: Grupo Salinas
- Chairman: Gustavo Guzmán
- League: Liga Premier - Serie A
- Apertura 2017: Preseason
Home colours	Away colours

Atlas Fútbol Club Premier was a professional football team that played in the Mexican Football League. They were currently playing in the Liga Premier (Mexico's Third Division). Atlas Fútbol Club Premier were affiliated with Club Atlas who plays in the Liga MX. The games were held in the city of Zapopan in the Estadio Alfredo "Pistache" Torres.
