= Cruz Azul Premier =

- Full name: Cruz Azul Fútbol Club, A.C. Premier
- Nicknames: La Máquina (The Machine); Los Cementeros (The Cementers); Los Celestes (The Sky-Blues)
- Founded: 14 July 2015; 11 years ago
- Dissolved: 2018; 8 years ago
- Ground: Estadio 10 de Diciembre
- Capacity: 7,761
- Owner: Cooperativa La Cruz Azul
- Chairman: Guillermo Álvarez Cuevas
- League: Liga Premier - Serie A
- Apertura 2017: Preseason
- Website: http://www.cruzazulfc.com/
Home colours	Away colours	Third colours

Cruz Azul Fútbol Club, A.C. Premier, commonly known as Cruz Azul Premier, was a professional football team that competed in the Liga Premier. It served as the official reserve team of Cruz Azul, which plays in Liga MX. The team hosted its home matches at Estadio 10 de Diciembre.
