= Chiapas F.C. Premier =

Mexican football club

Jaguares Premier
- Full name: Jaguares Fútbol Club Premier
- Nicknames: Jaguares (Jaguars); Los Felinos (The Felines); La Bestia (The Beast)
- Founded: 14 July 2015; 11 years ago
- Dissolved: 7 June 2017; 9 years ago
- Ground: Estadio Salvador Cabañas, Tuxtla Gutiérrez, Chiapas, Mexico
- Capacity: 1,000
Home colours	Away colours	Third colours

Chiapas Fútbol Club Premier was a professional football that played in the Liga Premier – Liga Premier de Ascenso. The games were played in the city of Tuxtla Gutiérrez in the Estadio Salvador Cabañas. 1

== History ==
The team was founded for the first time in 2015 when the Mexican Football Federation forced the member teams of the Liga MX to create an U-23 squad to take part in the then called Liga Premier de Ascenso, part of the third level of Mexican football. In June 2017 the team was dissolved as a result of the expulsion and subsequent disappearance of Chiapas F.C. of the Liga MX.

In May 2024, Chiapas F.C. was refounded after the relocation of the Liga de Expansión MX team Cimarrones de Sonora to Tuxtla Gutiérrez. Consequently, Cafetaleros de Chiapas, the team that already existed in the city, should have been converted into a reserve squad of the new club called Jaguares F.C. However, on July 12, 2024, Jaguares F.C. was rejected in the Liga de Expansión, so the team will compete in the Liga Premier using the place that had been reserved for the reserves squad, so this project was canceled.
