= Club León Premier =

Mexican football club

León Premier
- Full name: León Fútbol Club Premier
- Nicknames: Los Panzas Verdes (The Green Bellies); La Fiera (The Wild Beast); Los Esmeraldas (The Emeralds)
- Founded: 14 July 2015; 10 years ago
- Dissolved: 2018; 7 years ago
- Ground: Casa Club León; León, Guanajuato, Mexico
- Capacity: 1,000
- Owner: Grupo Pachuca
- Chairman: Jesús Martínez Murguia
- League: Liga Premier - Serie A
- Apertura 2017: Preseason
Home colours	Away colours

León Fútbol Club Premier was a professional football team that plays in the Mexican Football League. They were playing in the Liga Premier (Mexico's Third Division). León Fútbol Club Premier was affiliated with Club León who plays in the Liga MX. The games were held in the city of León in the Estadio Casa Club León.
