= Querétaro F.C. Premier =

Querétaro Premier
- Full name: Querétaro Fútbol Club Premier
- Nicknames: Los Gallos Blancos (The White Roosters); Los Albiazules (The White-and-Blues)
- Founded: 14 July 2015; 10 years ago
- Dissolved: 2018; 8 years ago
- Ground: CEGAR, Santiago de Querétaro, Querétaro, Mexico
- Capacity: 1,000
- Owner: Grupo Empresarial Ángeles (through Grupo Imagen)
- Chairman: Jaime Ordiales
- League: Liga Premier - Serie A
- Apertura 2017: Preseason
Home colours	Away colours

Querétaro Fútbol Club Premier was a professional football team that played in the Mexican Football League. They were playing in the Liga Premier (Mexico's Third Division). Querétaro Fútbol Club Premier was affiliated with Querétaro F.C. who plays in the Liga MX. The games were held in the city of Santiago de Querétaro in the CEGAR.

== Players ==
=== Current squad ===
Note: Flags indicate national team as defined under FIFA eligibility rules; some limited exceptions apply. Players may hold more than one non-FIFA nationality.

No. / Pos. / Nation / Player	No. / Pos. / Nation / Player
