= C.D. Veracruz Premier =

Mexican football club

Veracruz Premier
- Full name: Club Deportivo Tiburones Rojos de Veracruz Premier
- Nickname(s): Los Tiburones Rojos (The Red Sharks); El Tiburón (The Shark); Los Escualos (The Sharks)
- Founded: 14 July 2015; 10 years ago
- Dissolved: 2018; 7 years ago
- Ground: CAR Veracruz; Veracruz City, Veracruz, Mexico
- Capacity: 1,000
Home colours	Away colours

Club Deportivo Tiburones Rojos de Veracruz Premier was a professional football team that played in the Mexican Football League. They played in the Liga Premier (Mexico's Second Division). Tiburones Rojos de Veracruz Premier was affiliated with Tiburones Rojos de Veracruz who plays in the Liga MX. The games were held in Veracruz City in the CAR Veracruz.
