= Monarcas Morelia Premier =

- Full name: Club Atlético Monarcas Morelia Premier
- Nicknames: La Monarquía (The Monarchy); Los Canarios (The Canaries); Los Purépechas (The Purépechas); Los Ates (The Quince Jellies); El Equipo de la Fuerza (The Team Force)
- Founded: 14 July 2015; 10 years ago
- Dissolved: 2019; 6 years ago
- Ground: Estadio Morelos practice field Morelia, Michoacán
- Capacity: 1,000
- Owner: Grupo Salinas
- Chairman: Álvaro Dávila
- League: Liga Premier - Serie A
- Apertura 2017: Preseason
| Home colours | Away colours | Third colours |

Club Atlético Monarcas Morelia Premier was a professional football team that played in the Mexican Football League. They were playing in the Liga Premier (Mexico's Third Division). Club Atlético Monarcas Morelia Premier was affiliated with Monarcas Morelia who plays in the Liga MX. The games were held in the city of Morelia in the Estadio Morelos practice field.
