= Estadio Olímpico Universitario de Colima =

Stadium in Colima, Mexico

Coordinates: 19.2461°N 103.7014°W

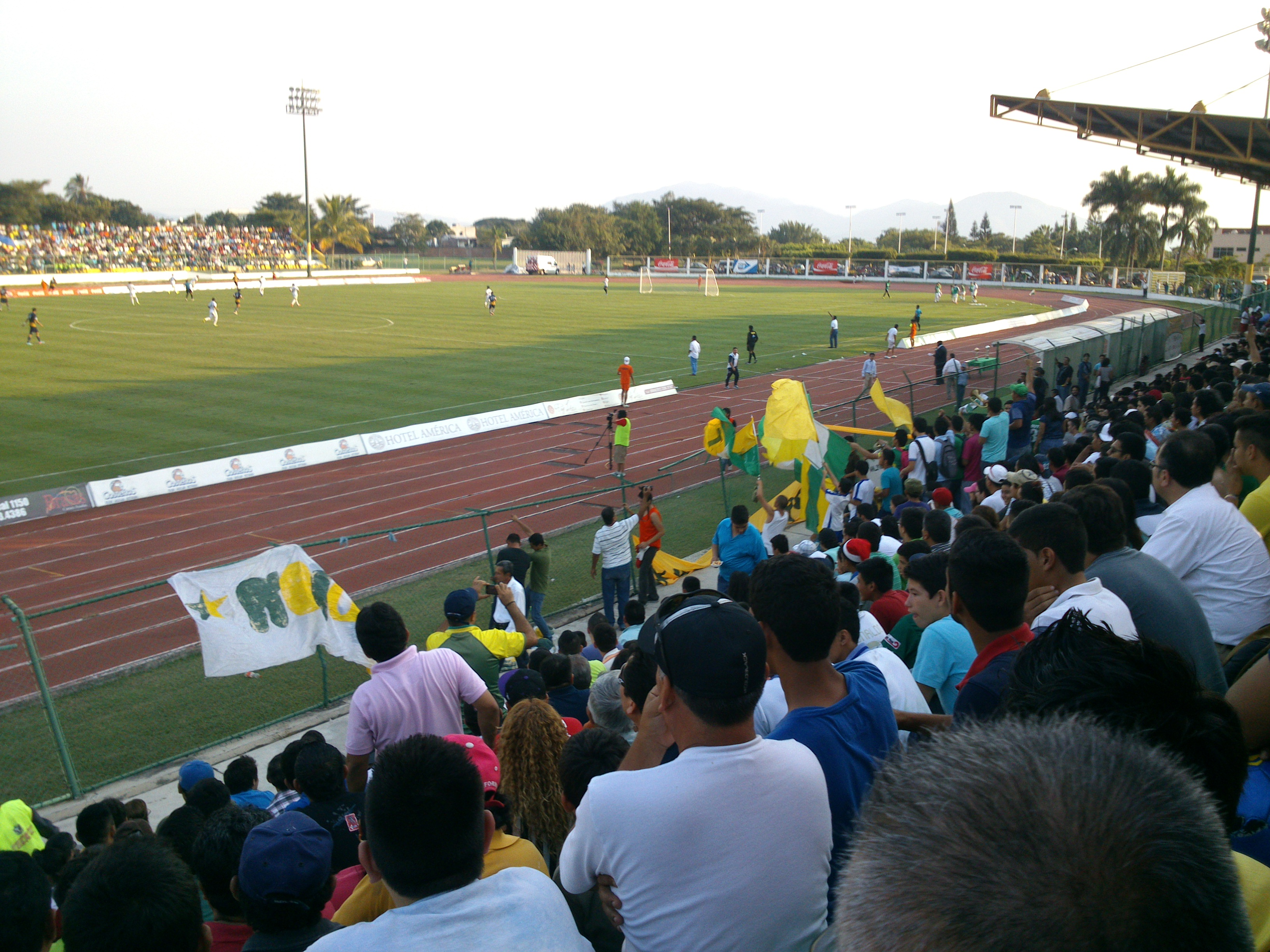
- Interactive map of Estadio Olímpico Universitario de Colima
- Full name: Estadio Olímpico Universitario de Colima
- Location: Colima City, Colima, Mexico
- Owner: University of Colima
- Capacity: 11,812
- Surface: Grass

Construction
- Opened: 1994

Tenants
- Loros UdeC (2008–2019); Colima F.C. (2020–present)

The Estadio Olímpico Universitario de Colima is a multi-use stadium in Colima City, Colima, Mexico. It was the home stadium of the Loros UdeC football club.

The stadium has a capacity of 12,000 people and opened in 1994.
