= C.F. Monterrey Premier =

Mexican football club

Monterrey Premier
- Full name: Club de Fútbol Monterrey Premier
- Nicknames: Los Rayados (The Striped Ones); La Pandilla (The Gang); Los Albiazules (The White-and-Blues)
- Founded: 14 July 2015; 11 years ago
- Dissolved: 2018; 8 years ago
- Ground: El Barrial; Santiago, Nuevo León
- Capacity: 570
- Owner: FEMSA
- Chairman: Duilio Davino
- League: Liga Premier - Serie A
- Apertura 2017: Preseason
- Website: http://www.rayados.com
| Home colours | Away colours |

Club de Fútbol Monterrey Premier was a professional football team that played in the Mexican Football League. They played in the Liga Premier (Mexico's Second Division). Club de Fútbol Monterrey Premier was affiliated with C.F. Monterrey who plays in the Liga MX. The games were held in the city of Santiago in El Barrial.

== Players ==
=== Current squad ===
Note: Flags indicate national team as defined under FIFA eligibility rules; some limited exceptions apply. Players may hold more than one non-FIFA nationality.

| No. / Pos. / Nation / Player | No. / Pos. / Nation / Player |
