= Santos Laguna Premier =

- Full name: Club Santos Laguna S.A. de C.V. Premier
- Nickname(s): Los Guerreros (The Warriors); Los Laguneros (The Harriers); Los Verdiblancos (The Green-and-Whites)
- Founded: 14 July 2015; 9 years ago
- Dissolved: 2018; 7 years ago
- Ground: Estadio Corona practice field Torreón, Coahuila, Mexico
- Capacity: 1,000
- Owner: Orlegi Deportes
- Chairman: Alejandro Irarragorri
- League: Liga Premier - Serie A
- Apertura 2017: Preseason
Home colours	Away colours

Club Santos Laguna S.A. de C.V. Premier was a professional football team that played in the Mexican Football League. They were playing in the Liga Premier (Mexico's Third Division). Club Santos Laguna S.A. de C.V. Premier was affiliated with Santos Laguna who plays in the Liga MX. The games were held in the city of Torreón in the Estadio Corona practice field.
