= 2020–21 Liga Premier de México season =

Liga Premier de México
- Season: 2020–21
- Champions: Irapuato (3rd title)
- Matches: 288
- Goals: 817 (2.84 per match)
- Top goalscorer: Daniel Delgadillo (22 goals)
- Biggest home win: Cafetaleros de Chiapas 9–1 Cañoneros Marina (14 March 2021); Inter Playa del Carmen 8–0 Ciervos (9 April 2021)
- Biggest away win: Dongu 0–7 Irapuato (30 January 2021)
- Highest scoring: Cafetaleros de Chiapas 9–1 Cañoneros Marina (14 March 2021)
- Longest winning run: Inter Playa del Carmen (6 matches)
- Longest unbeaten run: Inter Playa del Carmen (15 matches)
- Longest winless run: Ciervos (19 matches)
- Longest losing run: Cañoneros Marina; Cuautla (9 matches)
- Highest attendance: 7,000; Irapuato vs Cuautla (17 March 2021)
- Lowest attendance: 47; Mazorqueros vs UAZ (2 April 2021)
- Total attendance: 11,721 (11 matches)
- Average attendance: 1,065
- Stats are from the regular season only

The 2020–21 Liga Premier de México season was the third-tier football league of Mexico. The tournament began on 18 September 2020 and finished on 16 May 2021.

== Changes from the previous season ==
- UNAM Premier has discontinued their participation in Serie A to participate in the new Liga de Expansión MX.
- Atlético Bahía, Atlético Reynosa, Atlético San Francisco, Calor, Coras de Nayarit, Correcaminos UAT Premier, Deportivo Nuevo Chimalhuacán, La Paz, Murciélagos, Sporting Canamy, UACH and Yalmakán were put on hiatus for the 2020–21 season due to financial issues due to COVID-19.
- Cafetaleros de Chiapas Premier renamed to Cafetaleros de Chiapas, will stay in Chiapas and will become their Primary Team after their Ascenso MX Team moved to Cancun.
- Tepatitlán and Tlaxcala have been certified and promoted to the Liga de Expansión MX, while Atlético Reynosa did not get certified due to stadium issues.
- Colima F.C. and Mazorqueros F.C. joins in Serie A as expansion teams.
- Aguacateros CDU, Ciervos, Cuautla, Dongu and Zitácuaro joins in Serie A as expansion teams from Serie B.
- Real Zamora returns from hiatus but they were relocated and renamed as Azores de Hidalgo.
- Héroes de Zací tried to join in Serie A after being approved after a one-year hold due to stadium requirements were not met. However, to meet the requirements, the team was relocated to Acámbaro, Guanajuato, in addition, the franchise was rented to another administration other than the owners. However, the team was subsequently not approved to participate in the season.
- Atlético Irapuato was renamed as C.D. Irapuato due to changes in club ownership.
- Chapulineros de Oaxaca will decline their Liga Premier participation for 2020–21 season to participate in the Liga de Balompié Mexicano after one year return from hiatus.
- Deportivo CAFESSA Tlajomulco, Dorados de Sinaloa Premier, Mineros de Zacatecas Premier and Real Canamy Tlayacapan have dissolved.
- On January 23, 2021 Azores de Hidalgo was relocated and renamed as Inter de Querétaro, however, officially the team continued to be registered as Azores de Hidalgo for the rest of the season.

== Group 1 ==
=== Stadiums and locations ===
Location of teams in the 2020–21 Serie A Group 1

Club	Manager	City	Stadium	Capacity	Affiliate
Alacranes de Durango	(Mexico) Héctor Jair Real	Durango City, Durango	Francisco Zarco	18,000	—
Atlético San Luis	(Mexico) Luis Francisco García	San Luis Potosí City, San Luis Potosí	Alfonso Lastras	25,709	Atlético San Luis
Cimarrones de Sonora	(Mexico) José Islas	Hermosillo, Sonora	Héroe de Nacozari	18,747	Cimarrones de Sonora
Colima	(Mexico) René Isidoro García	Colima City, Colima	Olímpico Universitario de Colima	11,812	—
Gavilanes de Matamoros	(Mexico) Jorge Martínez Merino	Matamoros, Tamaulipas	El Hogar	22,000	—
La Piedad	(Mexico) Jorge Guerrero	La Piedad, Michoacán	Juan N. López	13,356	—
Leones Negros UdeG	(Mexico) Víctor Hugo Mora	Zapopan, Jalisco	Instalaciones Club Deportivo U.de G. Cancha 3	3,000	Leones Negros UdeG
Mazorqueros	(Mexico) Mario Trejo	Ciudad Guzmán, Jalisco	Municipal Santa Rosa	4,000	—
Mineros de Fresnillo	(Mexico) Joaquín Espinoza	Fresnillo, Zacatecas	Unidad Deportiva Minera Fresnillo	5,000	—
Saltillo	(Mexico) Jair García	Saltillo, Coahuila	Olímpico Francisco I. Madero	7,000	—
Tecos	(Mexico) Isaac Moreno	Zapopan, Jalisco	Tres de Marzo	18,779	—
Tuzos UAZ	(Mexico) Rubén Hernández	Zacatecas City, Zacatecas	Carlos Vega Villalba	20,068	—

=== Standings ===
Pos	Team	Pld	W	D	L	GF	GA	GD	Pts	Qualification or relegation
1	Alacranes de Durango	22	15	4	3	44	15	+29	52	Liguilla de Ascenso
2	La Piedad	22	13	4	5	44	25	+19	47	Liguilla de Ascenso
3	Colima	22	13	3	6	36	19	+17	46	Liguilla de Ascenso
4	Gavilanes de Matamoros	22	14	4	4	22	14	+8	46	Liguilla de Ascenso
5	Mineros de Fresnillo	22	9	5	8	35	29	+6	35	
6	Atlético San Luis	22	9	3	10	22	24	−2	32	
7	UAZ	22	8	6	8	25	28	−3	32	
8	Tecos	22	6	6	10	23	29	−6	25	
9	Mazorqueros	22	7	3	12	23	36	−13	24	
10	Saltillo	22	4	8	10	23	40	−17	22	
11	Leones Negros UdeG	22	5	3	14	25	42	−17	19	
12	Cimarrones de Sonora	22	2	5	15	13	34	−21	11	

Updated to match(es) played on 11 April 2021. Source: Liga Premier FMF

=== Positions by round ===
Qualification to Liguilla.

Team ╲ Round	1	2	3	4	5	6	7	8	9	10	11	12	13	14	15	16	17	18	19	20	21	22
Durango (Note: Pending match against Saltillo (between Weeks 7 and 9))	1	1	1	1	1	2	2	1	1	1	1	1	1	1	1	1	1	1	1	1	1	1
La Piedad (Note: Pending matches against UAZ (between Weeks 1 and 7); Saltillo (between Weeks 4 and 11) and Fresnillo (between Weeks 7 and 12))	7	11	9	9	7	6	6	6	3	2	3	3	3	3	2	3	2	2	2	2	2	2
Colima	2	3	2	3	2	1	1	2	2	3	2	2	2	2	4	5	5	4	3	3	3	3
Gavilanes (Note: Pending matches against UAZ (between Weeks 2 and 10); Saltillo (between Weeks 5 and 7); and Fresnillo (between Weeks 8 and 11))	11	12	12	8	11	8	10	11	7	4	4	4	5	5	5	4	3	3	4	4	4	4
Fresnillo (Note: Pending matches against Tecos (between Weeks 3 and 7); La Piedad (between Weeks 7 and 12); Gavilanes (between Weeks 8 and 11) and UAZ (between Weeks 9 and 10))	6	2	5	6	4	3	4	5	4	5	5	5	4	4	3	2	4	5	5	5	5	5
Atlético San Luis	12	6	4	4	6	5	5	4	6	7	7	7	6	6	6	6	6	6	6	6	6	6
UAZ (Note: Pending matches against La Piedad (between Weeks 1 and 7); Gavilanes (between Weeks 2 and 10) and Fresnillo (between Weeks 9 and 10))	8	9	11	12	9	9	7	8	8	8	8	8	9	9	9	8	7	7	7	7	7	7
Tecos (Note: Pending match against Fresnillo (between Weeks 3 and 7))	9	8	8	11	8	11	9	9	11	11	10	11	11	11	10	9	9	9	10	10	9	8
Mazorqueros	3	4	3	2	3	4	3	3	5	6	6	6	7	7	7	7	8	8	8	8	8	9
Saltillo (Note: Pending matches against La Piedad (since Week 4); Gavilanes (between Weeks 5 and 7); and Durango (between Weeks 7 and 9))	5	5	6	7	10	10	11	7	9	9	9	9	8	8	8	10	10	10	9	9	10	10
Leones Negros	4	7	7	5	5	7	8	10	10	10	11	10	10	10	11	11	11	11	11	11	11	11
Cimarrones	10	10	10	10	12	12	12	12	12	12	12	12	12	12	12	12	12	12	12	12	12	12

Updated to match(es) played on 11 April 2021. Source: Liga Premier FMF

=== Results ===
Home \ Away	ASL	CIM	COL	DUR	FRE	GAV	LPD	LNU	MAZ	SAL	TEC	UAZ
Atlético San Luis	—	2–1	2–0	1–1	1–0	1–1	0–2	0–2	2–1	2–0	1–2	1–1
Cimarrones	0–2	—	1–4	0–0	2–0	0–1	1–1	1–2	1–2	0–2	2–0	1–3
Colima	2–0	2–0	—	2–1	1–2	2–0	0–3	3–2	3–0	3–0	1–2	2–0
Durango	2–0	0–0	3–0	—	2–1	5–0	2–0	4–2	4–0	3–1	1–1	2–1
Fresnillo	1–2	2–0	1–1	0–1	—	1–1	4–2	5–1	3–1	2–2	2–1	3–0
Gavilanes de Matamoros	1–0	1–0	0–0	1–0	3–0	—	3–0	1–0	1–0	2–1	1–0	1–0
La Piedad	1–0	4–1	1–0	2–4	1–0	0–1	—	4–0	3–1	7–0	2–1	4–3
Leones Negros	1–2	1–1	0–2	1–4	2–2	0–1	0–1	—	1–2	3–0	2–1	2–2
Mazorqueros	1–0	1–1	0–2	1–0	0–2	1–2	1–1	1–0	—	1–1	2–0	3–0
Saltillo	1–3	1–0	0–1	1–2	2–2	0–0	2–2	2–0	3–2	—	2–2	2–3
Tecos	2–0	1–0	1–1	0–2	1–2	1–0	1–3	2–3	3–1	0–0	—	1–1
UAZ	1–0	2–0	0–4	0–1	2–0	2–0	0–0	1–0	3–1	0–0	0–0	—

Updated to match(es) played on 11 April 2021. Source: Liga Premier FMF
Legend: Blue = home team win; Yellow = draw; Red = away team win.

== Group 2 ==
=== Stadium and locations ===
Location of teams in the 2020–21 Serie A Group 2

Club	Manager	City	Stadium	Capacity	Affiliate
Aguacateros CDU	(Mexico) José Roberto Muñoz	Uruapan, Michoacán	Unidad Deportiva Hermanos López Rayón	5,000	—
CAFESSA Jalisco	(Mexico) Omar Briceño	Guadalajara, Jalisco	Jalisco	55,020	—
Cafetaleros de Chiapas	(Mexico) Miguel Ángel Casanova	Tuxtla Gutiérrez, Chiapas	Víctor Manuel Reyna	29,001	Cancún
Cañoneros Marina	(Mexico) José Luis Valdéz	Milpa Alta, Mexico City	Momoxco	3,500	—
Ciervos	(Mexico) Pablo Robles	Chalco de Díaz Covarrubias, State of Mexico	Arreola	2,500	—
Cruz Azul Hidalgo	(Mexico) Joaquín Moreno	Ciudad Cooperativa Cruz Azul, Hidalgo	10 de Diciembre	7,761	Cruz Azul
Cuautla	(Mexico) Carlos González	Cuautla, Morelos	Isidro Gil Tapia	5,000	—
Dongu	(Mexico) René Fuentes	Cuautitlán, State of Mexico	Los Pinos	5,000	—
Inter Playa del Carmen	(Mexico) Carlos Bracamontes	Playa del Carmen, Quintana Roo	Unidad Deportiva Mario Villanueva Madrid	7,500	—
Inter Querétaro	(Mexico) Hugo Serrano	Querétaro City, Querétaro	Unidad Deportiva La Cañada	2,000	—
Irapuato	(Mexico) Javier San Román	Irapuato, Guanajuato	Sergio León Chávez	25,000	—
Pioneros de Cancún	(Mexico) Daniel Moguel Hernández	Cancún, Quintana Roo	Andrés Quintana Roo	18,844	–
Zitácuaro	(Mexico) José Raúl Montes	Zitácuaro, Michoacán	Ignacio López Rayón	10,000	—

=== Standings ===
Pos	Team	Pld	W	D	L	GF	GA	GD	Pts	Qualification or relegation
1	Cruz Azul Hidalgo	24	16	5	3	52	18	+34	59	Liguilla de Ascenso
2	Inter Playa del Carmen	24	16	4	4	55	17	+38	57	Liguilla de Ascenso
3	Irapuato (C)	24	15	5	4	58	21	+37	57	Liguilla de Ascenso
4	Cafetaleros de Chiapas	24	13	8	3	63	24	+39	53	Liguilla de Ascenso
5	CAFESSA Jalisco	24	13	6	5	40	22	+18	50	
6	Aguacateros CDU	24	12	3	9	43	38	+5	44	
7	Pioneros de Cancún	24	12	4	8	37	33	+4	42	
8	Dongu	24	8	5	11	29	48	−19	32	
9	Zitácuaro	24	8	5	11	26	37	−11	31	
10	Cuautla	24	5	3	16	23	44	−21	19	
11	Inter Querétaro (Note: Since Week 14 Azores de Hidalgo was renamed as Inter Querétaro, however, in the FMF and Liga Premier they kept the name Azores de Hidalgo.)	24	4	5	15	27	61	−34	17	
12	Ciervos	24	2	4	18	12	63	−51	11	
13	Cañoneros Marina	24	2	3	19	17	56	−39	10	

Updated to match(es) played on 11 April 2021. Source: Liga Premier FMF
(C) Champions

=== Positions by round ===
Qualification to Liguilla.

Team ╲ Round	1	2	3	4	5	6	7	8	9	10	11	12	13	14	15	16	17	18	19	20	21	22	23	24	25	26
Cruz Azul Hidalgo (Note: Pending matches against Irapuato (between Weeks 1 and 14), Aguacateros CDU (between Weeks 7 and 13) and Ciervos (between Weeks 15 and 20))	8	4	1	1	1	1	1	1	2	2	2	1	1†	1	1	1	1	1	1	1	1	1	1	1	1	1†
Inter Playa (Note: Pending matches against Pioneros (between Weeks 12 and 16), Ciervos (between Weeks 13 and 18) and Cañoneros Marina (between Weeks 15 and 20))	4	3	4	7	4	5	4	3	5†	3	3	5	5	5	4	5	2	2	2	2	2	2†	2	2	3	2
Irapuato (Note: Pending matches against Cruz Azul Hidalgo (between Weeks 1 and 14); Cuautla (between Weeks 2 and 10; between Weeks 15 and 23) and Cafetaleros (between Weeks 7 and 12))	6	10	6	2	2	3	5	6	6	5†	4	4	4	4	5	4	5	4	4	5	5	3	3†	3	2	3
Cafetaleros (Note: Pending matches against Zitácuaro (between Weeks 4 and 6) and Irapuato (between Weeks 7 and 12))	2	1	2	3	3	2†	2	2	1	1	1	2	3	3	3	3	4	3	3†	4	3	4	4	4	4	4
CAFESSA (Note: Pending match against Zitácuaro (between Weeks 3 and 14).)	10	9	11	11	11†	9	6	5	4	6	5	3	2	2	2	2	3	5†	5	3	4	5	5	5	5	5
Aguacateros CDU (Note: Pending matches against Marina (between Weeks 6 and 12), Cruz Azul Hidalgo (between Weeks 7 and 13); Inter Querétaro (between Weeks 15 and 18); and Pioneros de Cancún (between Weeks 11 and 17))	11	8	9†	9	7	8	9	7	7	8	7	8	8	6	7	8†	7	6	6	6	6	6	6	7	7	6
Pioneros (Note: Pending matches against Aguacateros CDU (between Weeks 11 and 17) and Inter Playa (between Weeks 12 and 16))	12	7	3	5†	8	4	3	4	3	4	6	6	6	7	8	6	6†	7	7	7	7	7	7	6	6	7
Dongu (Note: Pending match against Inter Querétaro (between Weeks 14 and 19))	5	5†	8	4	5	7	7	8	8	9	9	9	9	9	9†	9	9	9	9	9	9	9	9	9	9	8
Zitácuaro (Note: Pending matches against CAFESSA (between Weeks 3 and 14); and Cafetaleros (between Weeks 4 and 6))	3	6	7	8	9	11	11†	10	9	7	8	7	7	8	6	7	8	8	8	8†	8	8	8	8	8	9
Cuautla (Note: Pending matches against Irapuato (between Weeks 2 and 10; between Weeks 15 and 23) and Inter (between Weeks 13 and 26).)	7†	11	12	12	12	10	10	11	11	11	12	12	12	12†	12	10	12	12	12	12	12	12	12	13	11	10
Inter Querétaro (Note: Since Week 14 the team was renamed as Inter Querétaro, however, in the FMF and Liga Premier they kept the name Azores de Hidalgo.) (Note: Pending matches against Cuautla (between Weeks 13 and 26), Dongu (between Weeks 14 and 19) and Aguacateros CDU (between Weeks 15 and 18))	9	12	13	13	13	13	13	13†	13	12	10	10	10	10	10	11	10	10	10	10	10†	10	10	10	10	11
Ciervos (Note: Pending matches against Inter Playa (between Weeks 13 and 18); Cañoneros Marina (since Week 14) and Cruz Azul Hidalgo (between Weeks 15 and 20))	13	13	10	10	10	12	12	12	12	13	13†	13	13	13	13	13	13	13	13	13	13	13	13	11†	12	12
Cañoneros Marina (Note: Pending matches against Aguacateros CDU (between Weeks 6 and 12), Ciervos (since Week 14) and Inter Playa (between Weeks 15 and 20))	1	2	5	6	6	6	8	9	10	10	11	11†	11	11	11	12	11	11	11	11	11	11	11	12	13†	13

Updated to match(es) played on 11 April 2021. Source: Liga Premier FMF
Notes: † indicates team rested that round

=== Results ===
Home \ Away	ADU	CFS	CFT	CMA	CIE	CRA	CUA	DON	IPC	AZO	IRA	PIO	ZIT
Aguacateros CDU	—	1–0	2–1	3–0	2–0	1–2	4–1	1–1	0–3	3–2	0–4	1–2	1–0
CAFESSA Jalisco	4–1	—	3–3	1–0	3–0	1–3	2–2	1–0	0–2	0–0	4–3	0–0	2–0
Cafetaleros de Chiapas	2–4	0–0	—	9–1	2–0	1–1	2–1	7–0	2–2	5–0	0–0	4–0	3–1
Cañoneros Marina	0–4	2–3	0–1	—	0–1	0–4	2–1	1–1	0–0	2–3	1–2	0–1	1–2
Ciervos	1–3	0–5	0–4	0–4	—	1–4	2–0	2–3	0–3	2–2	0–3	1–1	0–3
Cruz Azul Hidalgo	1–0	0–1	1–1	2–0	2–0	—	3–0	2–1	2–1	3–2	2–2	0–1	6–0
Cuautla	0–3	0–2	1–2	0–0	1–0	0–1	—	0–0	2–0	3–2	1–3	0–2	4–1
Dongu	2–2	0–1	0–4	4–2	3–1	0–4	2–1	—	0–2	2–1	0–7	2–1	0–1
Inter Playa	4–1	2–1	1–1	4–0	8–0	1–1	3–0	3–1	—	4–1	2–0	2–0	2–1
Inter Querétaro	0–0	2–0	0–4	2–1	2–1	0–3	0–2	1–4	1–4	—	1–4	1–2	2–2
Irapuato	1–3	0–0	4–2	6–0	0–0	0–2	2–1	2–0	1–0	5–0	—	4–1	2–1
Pioneros de Cancún	4–3	0–3	0–1	1–0	4–0	3–3	4–1	0–0	2–1	4–1	0–3	—	3–0
Zitácuaro	3–0	1–3	2–2	1–0	0–0	1–0	2–0	1–3	0–1	0–0	0–0	2–1	—

Updated to match(es) played on 11 April 2021. Source: Liga Premier FMF
Legend: Blue = home team win; Yellow = draw; Red = away team win.

== Regular season statistics ==
=== Top goalscorers ===
Players sorted first by goals scored, then by last name.

Rank	Player	Club	Goals
1	(Mexico) Daniel Delgadillo	Cafetaleros de Chiapas	22
2	(Mexico) Marco Granados	Irapuato	18
3	(Mexico) Brandon Rosas	Pioneros de Cancún	17
4	(Mexico) Brian Martínez	Cruz Azul Hidalgo	16
5	(Mexico) Luis Miguel Franco	La Piedad	15
6	(Mexico) Alberto García	Irapuato	12
6	(Mexico) William Guzmán	Alacranes de Durango	12
8	(Mexico) Luis Fernando Cruz	Colima	11
8	(Mexico) Raúl Suárez	Inter Playa del Carmen	11
10	(Mexico) Erick Bustos	Cruz Azul Hidalgo	9
10	(Mexico) Diego González	La Piedad	9
10	(Mexico) Juan Carlos Peña	Aguacateros CDU	9

Source:Liga Premier FMF

=== Hat-tricks ===
Player	For	Against	Result	Date	Round	Reference
(Mexico) Daniel Delgadillo	Cafetaleros de Chiapas	Pioneros de Cancún	4 – 0 (H)	20 September 2020	1	
(Mexico) Brandon Rosas	Pioneros de Cancún	Ciervos	4 – 0 (H)	24 October 2020	6	
(Mexico) Erick Bustos	Cruz Azul Hidalgo	Pioneros de Cancún	3 – 3 (A)	6 November 2020	8	
(Mexico) Luis Miguel Franco	La Piedad	Saltillo	7 – 0 (H)	29 November 2020	4	
(Mexico) Brian Martínez	Cruz Azul Hidalgo	Zitácuaro	6 – 0 (H)	30 November 2020	11	
(Mexico) Kevin Chaurand	Colima	UAZ	0 – 4 (A)	30 January 2021	14	
(Mexico) Marco Granados	Irapuato	Dongu	0 – 7 (A)	30 January 2021	16	
(Mexico) Luis Fernando Cruz	Colima	Mazorqueros	3 – 0 (H)	20 February 2021	17	
(Mexico) Christopher Cortés	UAZ	Saltillo	2 – 3 (A)	20 February 2021	17	
(Mexico) Daniel Delgadillo	Cafetaleros de Chiapas	Inter Querétaro	5 – 0 (H)	13 February 2021	18	
(Mexico) Salvador Estrella	Aguacateros CDU	Cañoneros Marina	0 – 4 (A)	20 February 2021	19	
(Mexico) Daniel Delgadillo	Cafetaleros de Chiapas	Cañoneros Marina	9 – 1 (H)	14 March 2021	22	

(H) – Home; (A) – Away

== Coefficient table ==
P	Team	Pts	G	Pts/G	GD
1	Cruz Azul Hidalgo	59	24	2.458	+34
2	Inter Playa del Carmen	57	24	2.375	+38
3	Irapuato	57	24	2.375	+37
4	Alacranes de Durango	52	22	2.364	+29
5	Cafetaleros de Chiapas	53	24	2.208	+39
6	La Piedad	47	22	2.136	+19
7	Colima	46	22	2.091	+17
8	Gavilanes de Matamoros	46	22	2.091	+8
9	CAFESSA Jalisco	50	24	2.083	+18
10	Aguacateros CDU	44	24	1.833	+5
11	Pioneros de Cancún	42	24	1.750	+4
12	Mineros de Fresnillo	35	22	1.591	+5
13	Atlético San Luis	32	22	1.455	–2
14	Tuzos UAZ	32	22	1.455	–3
15	Dongu	32	24	1.333	–19
16	Zitácuaro	31	24	1.292	–11
17	Tecos	25	22	1.136	–8
18	Mazorqueros	24	22	1.091	–13
19	Saltillo	22	22	1.000	–17
20	Leones Negros	19	22	0.864	–17
21	Cuautla	19	24	0.792	–21
22	Azores/Inter Querétaro	17	24	0.708	–34
23	Cimarrones de Sonora	11	22	0.500	–21
24	Ciervos	11	24	0.458	–51
25	Cañoneros Marina	10	24	0.417	–39

Last updated: April 11, 2021
Source: Liga Premier FMF
P = Position; G = Games played; Pts = Points; Pts/G = Ratio of points to games played; GD = Goal difference

== Attendance ==
=== Highest and lowest ===
Highest attended					Lowest attended			
Week	Home	Score	Away	Attendance	Home	Score	Away	Attendance
1	No matches with fans in attendance							
2	No matches with fans in attendance							
3	No matches with fans in attendance							
4	No matches with fans in attendance							
5	No matches with fans in attendance							
6	No matches with fans in attendance							
7	No matches with fans in attendance							
8	No matches with fans in attendance							
9	No matches with fans in attendance							
10	No matches with fans in attendance							
11	No matches with fans in attendance							
12	No matches with fans in attendance							
13	Cuautla	3–2	Inter de Querétaro	100	N/A			
14	No matches with fans in attendance							
15	Irapuato	2–1	Cuautla	7,000	N/A			
16	No matches with fans in attendance							
17	No matches with fans in attendance							
18	No matches with fans in attendance							
19	No matches with fans in attendance							
20	No matches with fans in attendance							
21	No matches with fans in attendance							
22	No matches with fans in attendance							
23	Inter Playa	4–1	Aguacateros CDU	100	Mazorqueros	3–0	UAZ	47
24	Irapuato	1–0	Inter Playa	1,500	N/A			
25	No matches with fans in attendance							
26	Irapuato	6–0	Cañoneros Marina	1,500	Durango	4–0	Mazorqueros	150

Source: Liga Premier FMF

1. Does not include matches played behind closed doors.
2. Match played on a later date than originally scheduled. So it could be played with supporters attendance unlike other games on the same week.

== Liguilla ==
The four best teams of each group play two games against each other on a home-and-away basis. The higher seeded teams play on their home field during the second leg. The winner of each match up is determined by aggregate score. In the quarterfinals and semifinals, if the two teams are tied on aggregate the higher seeded team advances. In the final, if the two teams are tied after both legs, the match goes to extra time and, if necessary, a penalty shoot-out.

Quarter-finals
1	Cruz Azul Hidalgo	0	1	1
8	Gavilanes de Matamoros	0	0	0
4	Alacranes de Durango (s)	0	0	0
5	Cafetaleros de Chiapas	0	0	0
2	Inter Playa del Carmen (s)	2	1	3
7	Colima	2	1	3
3	Irapuato	1	4	5
6	La Piedad	1	1	2

Semi-finals
1	Cruz Azul Hidalgo (s)	1	1	2
4	Alacranes de Durango	1	1	2
2	Inter Playa del Carmen	0	1	1
3	Irapuato	0	2	2

Final
1	Cruz Azul Hidalgo	0	1	1
3	Irapuato	2	1	3

=== Quarter-finals ===
The first legs were played on 17 and 18 April, and the second legs were played on 23 and 24 April 2021.

Team 1	Agg.	Team 2	1st leg	2nd leg
Cruz Azul Hidalgo	1–0	Gavilanes de Matamoros	0–0	1–0
Alacranes de Durango	(s) 0–0	Cafetaleros de Chiapas	0–0	0–0
Inter Playa del Carmen	(s) 3–3	Colima	2–2	1–1
Irapuato	5–2	La Piedad	1–1	4–1

All times are UTC−5

==== First leg ====
17 April 2021	Cafetaleros de Chiapas	0–0	Alacranes de Durango	Tuxtla Gutiérrez, Chiapas
16:00 CDT (UTC−5)		Report		Stadium: Estadio Víctor Manuel Reyna; Attendance: 365; Referee: Rafael Bonilla Vargas

17 April 2021	Gavilanes de Matamoros	0–0	Cruz Azul Hidalgo	Matamoros, Tamaulipas
17:00 CDT (UTC−5)		Report		Stadium: Estadio El Hogar; Attendance: 1,600; Referee: Miguel Ángel Morales Sánchez

17 April 2021	Colima	2–2	Inter Playa del Carmen	Colima City, Colima
19:00 CDT (UTC−5)	Madrid 32'; Chaurand 82'	Report	Calderón 38'; Suárez 64'	Stadium: Estadio Olímpico Universitario de Colima; Attendance: 1,200; Referee: Ricardo Emmanuel Chávez Sánchez

18 April 2021	La Piedad	1–1	Irapuato	La Piedad, Michoacán
16:00 CDT (UTC−5)	González 86'	Report	García 21'	Stadium: Estadio Juan N. López; Attendance: 1,265; Referee: Eduardo González Flores

==== Second leg ====
23 April 2021	Inter Playa del Carmen	1–1 (3–3 agg.)	Colima	Playa del Carmen, Quintana Roo
16:00 EST (UTC−5)	Calderón 68'	Report	Chaurand 36' (pen.)	Stadium: Unidad Deportiva Mario Villanueva Madrid; Attendance: 800; Referee: Ramón Guerrero Martínez

23 April 2021	Alacranes de Durango	0–0 (0–0 agg.)	Cafetaleros de Chiapas	Durango City, Durango
20:30 CDT (UTC−5)		Report		Stadium: Estadio Francisco Zarco; Attendance: 2,000; Referee: Mauricio Eleazar López Sánchez

24 April 2021	Cruz Azul Hidalgo	1–0 (1–0 agg.)	Gavilanes de Matamoros	Ciudad Cooperativa Cruz Azul, Hidalgo
16:00 CDT (UTC−5)	Sánchez 59'	Report		Stadium: Estadio 10 de Diciembre; Attendance: 0 Referee: José Roberto González Robledo

24 April 2021	Irapuato	4–1 (5–2 agg.)	La Piedad	Irapuato, Guanajuato
19:00 CDT (UTC−5)	González 34'; Hurtado 50'; Granados 67'; García 82'	Report	López 16'	Stadium: Estadio Sergio León Chávez; Attendance: 7,000; Referee: Joaquín Alberto Vizcarra Armenta

=== Semi-finals ===
The first legs were played on 29 April, and the second legs were played on 2 May 2021.

Team 1	Agg.	Team 2	1st leg	2nd leg
Cruz Azul Hidalgo	(s) 2–2	Alacranes de Durango	1–1	1–1
Inter Playa del Carmen	1–2	Irapuato	0–0	1–2

All times are UTC−5

==== First leg ====
29 April 2021	Irapuato	0–0	Inter Playa del Carmen	Irapuato, Guanajuato
20:00 CDT (UTC−5)		Report		Stadium: Estadio Sergio León Chávez; Attendance: 7,000; Referee: Miguel Ángel Morales Sánchez

29 April 2021	Alacranes de Durango	1–1	Cruz Azul Hidalgo	Durango City, Durango
20:30 CDT (UTC−5)	Guzmán 30'	Report	Bustos 14'	Stadium: Estadio Francisco Zarco; Attendance: 2,000; Referee: Ricardo Emmanuel Chávez Sánchez

==== Second leg ====
2 May 2021	Inter Playa del Carmen	1–2 (1–2 agg.)	Irapuato	Playa del Carmen, Quintana Roo
16:00 EST (UTC−5)	García 36'	Report	O. González 6'; Hurtado 90+1'	Stadium: Unidad Deportiva Mario Villanueva Madrid; Attendance: 1,600; Referee: José Roberto González Robledo

2 May 2021	Cruz Azul Hidalgo	1–1 (2–2 agg.)	Alacranes de Durango	Ciudad Cooperativa Cruz Azul, Hidalgo
16:00 CDT (UTC−5)	Martínez 17'	Report	Osuna 19'	Stadium: Estadio 10 de Diciembre; Attendance: 0 Referee: Joaquín Alberto Vizcarra Armenta

=== Final ===
The first leg was played on 9 May, and the second leg was played on 16 May 2021.

Team 1	Agg.	Team 2	1st leg	2nd leg
Cruz Azul Hidalgo	1–3	Irapuato	0–2	1–1

All times are UTC−5

==== First leg ====
9 May 2021	Irapuato	2–0	Cruz Azul Hidalgo	Irapuato, Guanajuato
19:30 CDT (UTC−5)	González 56'; Granados 66'	Report		Stadium: Estadio Sergio León Chávez; Attendance: 11,992; Referee: Joaquín Alberto Vizcarra Armenta

==== Second leg ====
16 May 2021	Cruz Azul Hidalgo	1–1 (1–3 agg.)	Irapuato	Mexico City
12:00 CDT (UTC−5)	Cedillo 31'	Report	González 65'	Stadium: Estadio Ciudad de los Deportes; Attendance: 0 Referee: José Roberto González Robledo

2020–21 winners

3rd title

== See also ==
- 2020–21 Liga MX season
- 2020–21 Liga de Expansión MX season
- 2020–21 Liga TDP season
