= 2019–20 Liga Premier de México season =

Mexican football season

Liga Premier de México
- Season: 2019–20
- Matches: 471
- Goals: 1,400 (2.97 per match)
- Top goalscorer: Serie A: Humberto Guzmán (16 goals); Serie B: Illian Hernández (22 goals)
- Biggest home win: Serie A: Murciélagos 8–2 Atlético Bahía (8 November 2019); Serie B: ACD Uruapan 9–0 Nuevo Chimalhuacán (5 October 2019)
- Biggest away win: Serie A: Tecos 2–7 Atlético Reynosa (28 February 2020); Serie B: Nuevo Chimalhuacán 0–6 Mineros de Zacatecas (16 November 2019)
- Highest scoring: Serie A: Murciélagos 8–2 Atlético Bahía (8 November 2019); Serie B: Real Canamy 5–5 La Paz (7 September 2019)
- Longest winning run: Serie A: UACH (8 matches); Serie B: Chapulineros (6 matches)
- Longest unbeaten run: Serie A: Tepatitlán (15 matches); Serie B: Chapulineros (10 matches)
- Longest winless run: Serie A: Atlético San Luis (18 matches); Serie B: Nuevo Chimalhuacán (15 matches)
- Longest losing run: Serie A: Atlético Bahía (11 matches); Serie B: Dongu (9 matches)
- Highest attendance: Serie A:12,000; Irapuato vs Pioneros de Cancún (17 August 2019); Serie B:3,000; La Paz vs Nuevo Chimalhuacán (17 August 2019); 3,300; La Paz vs Chapulineros (2 March 2020)
- Lowest attendance: Serie A:50; UAT vs UAZ (17 August 2019); Serie B:0; Aguacateros CDU vs Chapulineros (24 August 2019)
- Total attendance: Serie A:330,650; Serie B:72,270
- Average attendance: Serie A:1,084; Serie B:472
- Stats are from the regular season only

The 2019–20 Liga Premier de México season was divided into two divisions named Serie A and Serie B. Liga Premier is the third-tier and fourth-tier football league of Mexico. The tournament began on 16 August 2019. On 15 April 2020 the regular season was suspended due to COVID-19 pandemic. On 22 May 2020, the 2019–20 season was officially cancelled.

== Serie A ==
=== Changes from the previous season ===
- Toluca, América, Necaxa, Monarcas Morelia and Guadalajara Premier were discontinued due to possible creation of Liga MX U23 league.
- Marina was promoted to Serie A as 2018-19 Serie B winner.
- Atlético Saltillo Soccer, CAFESSA and Mineros de Fresnillo were promoted from Serie B as expansion teams.
- Loros UdeC was promoted to Ascenso MX.
- Atlético San Luis Premier joined the league.
- Deportivo Tepic J.A.P. franchise returned to the division as Atlético Bahía.
- Due to ground problems Real Zamora was put on hiatus in the 2019–20 season.
- Tuxtla F.C. ceased operation.
- Ocelotes UNACH reached an agreement with Cafetaleros de Chiapas, the team was promoted to Serie A, but moved to Tapachula and was renamed as Cafetaleros de Chiapas Premier.
- Cocodrilos de Tabasco were relocated in Liga TDP by their board and renamed to Pejelagartos de Tabasco.
- Héroes de Zaci, 2018–19 Liga TDP champions, remained in the same league due to problems with the ground.
- Pacific F.C. was on hiatus this season. The team will seek to obtain a place in the Ascenso MX through negotiations with another franchise for the 2020–21 season.
- Atlético Saltillo Soccer was renamed Saltillo F.C. but officially kept the original name.

==== Mid-season changes ====
- On December 18, 2019, as part of the disaffiliation of Club Veracruz two week earlier, Albinegros de Orizaba has also been disaffiliated from Serie A and will not participate in Second Half of Season.

=== Group 1 ===
==== Teams information ====
Location of teams in the 2019–20 Serie A Group 1

Club	Manager	City	Stadium	Capacity	Affiliate
Alacranes de Durango	(Mexico) Héctor Jair Real	Durango City, Durango	Francisco Zarco	18,000	—
Atlético Bahía	(Mexico) José Antonio Rizo (Interim)	Bahía de Banderas, Nayarit	Ciudad del Deporte San José del Valle	4,000	—
Atlético Reynosa	(Mexico) Gastón Obledo	Reynosa, Tamaulipas	Unidad Deportiva Solidaridad	20,000	—
Cimarrones de Sonora	(Mexico) Mario López	Hermosillo, Sonora	Héroe de Nacozari	18,747	Cimarrones de Sonora
Coras de Nayarit	(Mexico) Marco Díaz Ávalos (Interim)	Tepic, Nayarit	Nicolás Álvarez Ortega	12,271	—
Gavilanes de Matamoros	(Mexico) Lorenzo López Balboa	Matamoros, Tamaulipas	El Hogar	22,000	—
Leones Negros UdeG	(Mexico) Sergio Díaz	Zapopan, Jalisco	Club Deportivo U. de G.	3,000	Leones Negros UdeG
Mineros de Fresnillo	(Mexico) Joaquín Espinoza	Fresnillo, Zacatecas	Unidad Deportiva Minera Fresnillo	5,000	—
Murciélagos	(Mexico) Valentín Arredondo	Los Mochis, Sinaloa	Centenario	11,134	—
Saltillo	(Mexico) Francisco Javier Gamboa	Saltillo, Coahuila	Olímpico Francisco I. Madero	7,000	—
Tecos	(Mexico) Daniel Alcántar	Zapopan, Jalisco	Tres de Marzo	18,779	—
Tepatitlán de Morelos	(Mexico) Paco Ramírez	Tepatitlán, Jalisco	Gregorio "Tepa" Gómez	12,500	—
UACH	(Mexico) Carlos Kanahan	Chihuahua City, Chihuahua	Olímpico Universitario José Reyes Baeza	22,000	—
UAT Premier	(Mexico) Arturo Chávez (Note: Isaac Moreno couldn't be registered with the FMF)	Ciudad Victoria, Tamaulipas	Marte R. Gómez	10,520	Correcaminos UAT
UAZ	(Mexico) Rubén Hernández	Zacatecas City, Zacatecas	Carlos Vega Villalba	20,068	—

==== Standings ====
Pos	Team	Pld	W	D	L	GF	GA	GD	BP	Pts
1	Tepatitlán	23	18	4	1	55	14	+41	3	61
2	UAZ	24	15	7	2	47	24	+23	4	56
3	Atlético Reynosa	23	16	2	5	51	22	+29	3	53
4	Gavilanes de Matamoros	23	13	3	7	41	24	+17	6	48
5	Alacranes de Durango	23	12	6	5	48	25	+23	4	46
6	Coras de Nayarit	22	11	7	4	36	25	+11	4	44
7	Murciélagos	24	11	3	10	45	36	+9	2	38
8	UACH	23	11	4	8	34	30	+4	1	38
9	Saltillo	24	10	5	9	28	23	+5	2	37
10	Tecos	22	7	2	13	30	41	−11	2	25
11	UAT	23	5	5	13	26	41	−15	1	21
12	Leones Negros UdeG	23	4	4	15	29	49	−20	1	17
13	Atlético Bahía	24	4	3	17	18	65	−47	0	15
14	Mineros de Fresnillo	24	3	4	17	17	51	−34	0	13
15	Cimarrones de Sonora	23	2	5	16	15	50	−35	1	12

Updated to match(es) played on 18 March 2020. Source: Liga Premier FMF

==== Positions by round ====
Leader and qualification to quarter-finals
Qualification to quarter-finals
Last place in table

Team ╲ Round	1	2	3	4	5	6	7	8	9	10	11	12	13	14	15	16	17	18	19	20	21	22	23	24	25
Tepatitlán (Note: Team with a pending match between weeks 4 and 8, and between Weeks 16 and 17)	3	1	2†	4	2	5	4	4	3	2	1	1	1	1	1	1	1	1†	1	1	1	1	1	1	1
UAZ	14	10	4	2	1	1	1	1	1	1	3†	2	3	4	6	6	3	3	2	2	2	2	2	2	2
A. Reynosa	1	6†	10	12	11	12	6	6	4	3	2	4	4	3	2	2	2†	2	3	3	4	3	3	3	3
Gavilanes	8	9	5	8	4	3	3	2	2†	4	6	5	6	5	4	5	6	5	6	4	3	4	4	4†	4
Durango	11	2	6	1	3†	2	2	3	5	5	4	3	2	2	3	4	4	6	4	5†	5	5	6	5	5
Coras (Note: Team with a pending match between weeks 2 and 13)	5	8	8	10†	9	9	9	7	7	6	5	6	5	6	5	3	5	4	5†	6	6	6	5	6	6
Murciélagos (Note: Team with a pending match between weeks 2 and 13, and between Weeks 16 and 17)	13	13	12	7	5	4	5	5	6	7	7	7	7	8†	8	8	8	8	9	7	7	7	7	7	7
UACH	9†	11	7	11	12	13	13	13	12	9	9	9	8	7	7	7†	7	7	7	8	8	8	8	8	8
Saltillo	4	4	9	9	10	10	11	8	8	8	8	8†	9	9	9	9	9	9	8	9	9	9	9	9	9
Tecos	2	3	3	3	7	7	8†	10	11	12	12	10	11	10	10	10	10	10	10	10	10	10†	10	10	10
UAT	6	5	1	5	6	6†	7	9	10	13	13	13	12	12	12	12	12	11	12	11	11†	11	11	11	11
Leones N.	10	7	11	6	8	8	10	11	9	10†	10	11	10	11	11	11	11	12	11	12	12	12	12	12	12†
At. Bahía (Note: Team with a pending match between Weeks 16 and 17)	15	15	14	15	15	11	12	12	13	11	11	12	13	13	13†	13	13	14	14	15	15	15	15	13	13
Mineros Fr.	12	14	15	14	14	15	15	15	15	15	15	14	14†	14	14	14	15	13	13	13	14	13	13	14	14
Cimarrones	7	12	13	13	13	14	14	14†	14	14	14	15	15	15	15	15	14	15	15	14	13	14	14†	15	15

Updated to match(es) played on 15 April 2020. Source: Liga Premier FMF
Notes: † indicates team rested that round

==== Results ====
Each team plays once all other teams in 30 rounds regardless of it being a home or away match. In this group each team rests on two rounds of the season.

Home \ Away	ABH	ARY	CIM	CNA	DUR	GAV	LNU	MFR	MUR	SFC	TEC	TPM	UCH	UAT	UAZ
At. Bahía	—	0–3	2–0	0–2	0–4	1–3	3–1	0–3	—	—	2–1	1–3	—	1–3	1–0
At. Reynosa	4–0	—	3–0	2–0	0–3	4–0	—	5–0	—	—	2–0	1–0	3–0	2–1	0–1
Cimarrones	2–2	1–3	—	0–2	—	0–0	4–3	0–0	2–1	2–4	—	0–5	0–2	1–2	0–2
Coras	1–1	1–1	—	—	3–2	0–2	—	2–1	0–0	—	2–0	0–1	2–0	3–4	2–2
Durango	4–1	1–0	4–0	1–2	—	—	1–0	4–1	3–3	1–2	—	2–2	3–1	4–0	—
Gavilanes	3–0	2–2	2–0	—	1–2	—	4–2	2–0	4–0	2–0	2–0	1–2	1–1	—	2–3
Leones N.	2–0	2–3	2–0	4–4	—	0–2	—	0–1	1–3	2–1	0–3	—	4–2	0–0	1–2
Mineros Fr.	—	—	1–1	0–3	0–3	0–2	2–1	—	0–2	0–1	1–1	1–3	0–1	1–1	1–2
Murciélagos	8–2	0–2	3–0	1–2	4–2	3–1	3–0	—	—	0–1	3–1	0–3	1–2	4–2	1–2
Saltillo	4–0	1–2	1–1	0–1	0–0	1–3	1–1	2–0	2–0	—	1–0	—	1–0	1–1	0–0
Tecos	2–0	2–7	3–1	—	1–2	—	3–2	4–1	0–1	1–0	—	2–3	—	—	1–3
Tepatitlán	3–0	4–0	1–0	1–1	0–0	—	5–0	—	2–1	2–1	2–1	—	5–0	3–0	
UACH	4–0	2–1	—	1–1	2–0	2–0	0–0	2–1	—	3–1	4–0	0–1	—	3–1	1–1
UAT	1–1	1–2	—	1–2	1–1	0–1	—	3–0	1–2	0–2	0–2	0–2	—	—	1–0
UAZ	4–0	—	2–0	—	1–1	2–1	2–1	6–2	1–1	1–0	2–2	2–2	3–1	3–2	—

Updated to match(es) played on 15 April 2020. Source: Liga Premier FMF
Legend: Blue = home team win; Yellow = draw; Red = away team win.

=== Group 2 ===
==== Teams information ====
Location of teams in the 2019–20 Serie A Group 2

Club	Manager	City	Stadium	Capacity	Affiliate
Atlético Irapuato	(Mexico) Omar Arellano	Irapuato, Guanajuato	Sergio León Chávez	25,000	—
Atlético San Luis	(Mexico) Julio Servín	San Luis Potosí City, San Luis Potosí	Plan de San Luis	18,000	Atlético San Luis
CAFESSA Jalisco	(Mexico) Jaime Durán	Guadalajara, Jalisco	Jalisco	55,020	—
Cafetaleros de Chiapas	(Mexico) Marco Valverde	Tapachula, Chiapas	Olímpico de Tapachula	18,017	Cafetaleros de Chiapas
Cruz Azul Hidalgo	(Mexico) Carlos Roberto Pérez	Ciudad Cooperativa Cruz Azul, Hidalgo	10 de Diciembre	7,761	Cruz Azul
Inter Playa del Carmen	(Mexico) Marco Antonio Palacios	Playa del Carmen, Quintana Roo	Unidad Deportiva Mario Villanueva Madrid	7,500	—
Marina	(Mexico) José Gerardo Espinoza	Milpa Alta, Mexico City	Momoxco	3,500	—
Pioneros de Cancún	(Mexico) Carlos Bracamontes	Cancún, Quintana Roo	Andrés Quintana Roo (Note: The team registered Estadio Andrés Quintana Roo as its official venue, however, they played most of the games at the Estadio Cancún 86.)	17,289	—
Reboceros de La Piedad	(Mexico) Cristian Martínez Malagón (Interim)	La Piedad, Michoacán	Juan N. López	13,356	—
Sporting Canamy	(Mexico) Gerardo Durón	Oaxtepec, Morelos	Olímpico de Oaxtepec	9,000	—
Tlaxcala	(Argentina) Lorenzo Sáez	Nanacamilpa, Tlaxcala	Unidad Deportiva José Brindis	3,000	—
UNAM	(Mexico) Carlos Humberto González	Coyoacán, Mexico City	La Cantera	2,000	UNAM
Yalmakán	(Mexico) Víctor Manuel Morales	Chetumal, Quintana Roo	José López Portillo	6,600	—

==== Standings ====
Pos	Team	Pld	W	D	L	GF	GA	GD	BP	Pts
1	Tlaxcala	20	13	4	3	30	14	+16	6	49
2	Atlético Irapuato	20	12	5	3	42	27	+15	3	44
3	CAFESSA Jalisco	20	9	6	5	28	22	+6	4	37
4	Pioneros de Cancún	20	8	8	4	36	25	+11	3	35
5	UNAM	21	8	7	6	33	27	+6	3	34
6	Cruz Azul Hidalgo	20	7	8	5	30	19	+11	3	32
7	Yalmakán	21	7	6	8	31	36	−5	1	28
8	Inter Playa del Carmen	20	7	6	7	32	26	+6	0	27
9	La Piedad	21	8	3	10	26	33	−7	0	27
10	Cafetaleros de Chiapas	20	5	7	8	25	33	−8	3	25
11	Marina	20	6	5	9	19	33	−14	2	25
12	Sporting Canamy	20	2	6	12	15	32	−17	0	12
13	Atlético San Luis	21	2	5	14	18	38	−20	1	12

Updated to match(es) played on 15 March 2020. Source: Liga Premier FMF

==== Positions by round ====
Leader and qualification to quarter-finals
Qualification to quarter-finals
Last place in table

Team ╲ Round	1	2	3	4	5	6	7	8	9	10	11	12	13	14	15	16	17	18	19	20	21	22
Tlaxcala	1	1	1	1	1	1	1	1	1	1	1	1	1	1	1	1	1	1	1†	1	1	1
Irapuato	4	9	6	8	6	4	3	2	6	3	2	2	2	2	2	2	2†	2	2	2	2	2
CAFESSA	7	8	10	10	8	5	7	7	9	6	5	4	4	3	4†	4	5	4	4	5	5	3
Pioneros	5	3	2	4	5	9	5	3	2	2	4	3	3	5	3	3	3	3	3	3	3	4†
UNAM	8	6	9	7	10	7	4	6	3	4	7	9	7	7	7	7	8	6	6	6	4	5
C. Azul H.	2	2	3	5	4	8	9	8	7	9	6	5	5	4	5	5	4	5†	5	4	6	6
Yalmakán	13	10	5	3	2	2	6	4	4	7	9	8	9	9	9	10	10	8	9	9	9	7
Inter Playa	3	4	4	2	3	3	2	5	5	5	3	6	6	6	6	6†	6	7	7	7	7	8
La Piedad	12	13	8	12	9	6	8	9	8	8	8	7	8	8	8	9	9	9	8	8	8	9
Cafetaleros	9	5	7	11	12	11	12	12	11	11	10	10	10	10	10	8	7	10	10	11†	10	10
Marina	10	7	11	6	7	10	11	11	12	12	12	12	12	11	11	11	11	11	11	10	11†	11
S. Canamy	6	11	12	9	11	12	10	10	10	10	11	11	11	12†	12	12	12	12	12	12	12	12
At S. Luis	11	12	13	13	13	13	13	13	13	13	13	13	13	13	13	13	13	13	13	13	13	13

Updated to match(es) played on 15 April 2020. Source: Liga Premier FMF
Notes: † indicates team rested that round

==== Results ====
Each team plays once all other teams in 26 rounds regardless of it being a home or away match.

Home \ Away	IRA	ASL	CCH	CFS	CRA	IPC	LPD	MAR	PIO	SCA	TLA	UNM	YAL
At. Irapuato	—	3–2	—	—	2–2	0–0	2–3	3–0	1–1	1–0	2–2	3–2	1–0
At. San Luis	0–3	—	—	0–1	—	2–1	0–1	0–0	0–1	1–0	3–3	0–1	1–4
Cafetaleros	2–2	2–2	—	1–3	0–0	2–1	3–0	3–0	—	0–1	0–2	1–0	2–2
CAFESSA Jal	2–3	3–2	3–2	—	0–0	1–1	2–2	0–2	0–1	—	0–1	0–2	—
Cruz Azul H.	2–3	2–0	1–2	1–1	—	2–3	3–0	4–0	—	2–0	0–1	—	0–0
Inter Playa	1–0	1–0	5–0	2–3	0–0	—	—	4–1	2–2	3–1	0–2	—	2–0
La Piedad	2–3	3–2	2–1	—	0–1	2–1	—	1–0	3–1	2–1	1–3	1–2	1–1
Marina	—	2–1	—	0–1	0–0	2–1	2–0	—	0–4	4–2	0–1	1–1	1–0
Pioneros	1–2	2–0	5–2	0–0	3–3	3–1	0–0	—	—	1–1	—	2–0	3–4
Sp. Canamy	—	0–0	2–2	0–2	1–0	—	—	2–2	1–1	—	1–2	0–4	0–1
Tlaxcala	0–1	—	2–0	0–0	0–1	2–2	1–0	—	1–0	1–0	—	1–2	2–0
UNAM	3–1	1–1	0–0	1–2	1–4	1–1	2–1	1–1	2–3	1–1	—	—	4–1
Yalmakán	0–4	4–1	0–0	1–4	—	—	2–1	4–1	2–2	2–1	1–3	2–2	—

Updated to match(es) played on 15 April 2020. Source: Liga Premier FMF
Legend: Blue = home team win; Yellow = draw; Red = away team win.

=== Regular season statistics ===
==== Top goalscorers ====
Players sorted first by goals scored, then by last name.

Rank	Player	Club	Goals
1	(Mexico) Humberto Guzmán	Tepatitlán	16
2	(Mexico) José Pablo Velasco	UAZ	14
2	(Brazil) Igor Neves	Atlético Reynosa	14
4	(Mexico) Efraín Torres	Gavilanes / Saltillo	13
5	(Colombia) Juan David Angulo	Atlético Reynosa	12
5	(Mexico) Brandon Rosas	CAFESSA Jalisco	12
7	(Mexico) Luis Miguel Franco	Yalmakán	11
7	(Mexico) Erick Bustos	Irapuato	11
9	(Mexico) Óscar Gallardo	Sporting Canamy	10
9	(Mexico) Alan Islas	Marina	10
9	(Mexico) Adrián Muro	Durango	10
9	(Mexico) Ulises Jaimes	Tepatitlán	10

Source: Liga Premier FMF

==== Hat-tricks ====
Player	For	Against	Result	Date	Round	Reference
(Mexico) Erick Bustos	Irapuato	UNAM	3–2 (H)	14 September 2019	5	
(Mexico) Daniel Delgadillo	Pioneros de Cancún	Cafetaleros de Chiapas	5–2 (H)	9 November 2019	12	
(Paraguay) Ariel Ortega	Alacranes de Durango	Mineros de Zacatecas	4–1 (H)	17 January 2020	17	
(Mexico) Efraín Torres	Saltillo	Cimarrones de Sonora	2–4 (A)	30 January 2020	19	
(Mexico) Humberto González	Tepatitlán	Atlético Reynosa	4–0 (H)	1 February 2020	19	
(Brazil) Igor Neves	Atlético Reynosa	Tecos	2–7 (A)	28 February 2020	23	
(Mexico) José Pablo Velasco	UAZ	Mineros de Fresnillo	6–2 (H)	29 February 2020	23	
(Mexico) José Almanza	Gavilanes de Matamoros	Atlético Bahía	11–1 (H)	29 February 2020	23	
(Mexico) Erick Bustos	Irapuato	La Piedad	2–3 (A)	15 March 2020	25	

(H) – Home; (A) – Away

=== Attendance ===
==== Per team ====
Pos	Team	Total	High	Low	Average	Change
1	Irapuato	97,000	12,000	5,000	9,700	+15.7%
2	Saltillo	42,300	7,000	800	3,254	+183.7%^{1}
3	Gavilanes de Matamoros	32,100	9,000	800	2,675	−39.0%
4	Tepatitlán	25,300	4,000	800	2,300	+38.0%
5	Tlaxcala	22,476	5,000	776	2,098	+98.1%
6	Atlético Reynosa	19,000	3,000	500	1,727	+5.5%
6	Inter Playa del Carmen (Note: The team played matches against Irapuato, Orizaba and Sporting Canamy at Estadio Cancún 86, Cancún)	14,157	3,000	500	1,287	−7.2%
8	La Piedad	12,500	2,700	500	1,250	−38.2%
9	Coras de Nayarit	11,250	2,000	150	1,023	+4.7%
10	Pioneros de Cancún (Note: The team played some matches at Estadio Cancún 86, Cancún)	8,220	2,000	250	822	−23.2%
11	CAFESSA Jalisco	7,525	1,500	150	753	n/a^{2}
12	Alacranes de Durango	8,100	1,000	400	736	+25.4%
13	Cafetaleros de Chiapas	5,200	1,000	0	520	−30.0%^{3}
14	Yalmakán	5,652	700	350	487	−32.1%
15	Tecos	4,100	700	200	410	+60.2%
16	Atlético Bahía (Note: Match against Atlético Reynosa was suspended by FMF due to Atlético Bahía debt) (Note: Match against Cimarrones de Sonora was played at Estadio Municipal at Ensenada, Baja California)	3,500	1,500	100	350	n/a^{2}
17	Cruz Azul Hidalgo	2,500	500	100	250	−12.3%
18	Mineros de Fresnillo	3,100	500	100	264	−20.0%^{1}
19	Murciélagos (Note: Match against Tepatitlán was suspended by FMF due to Murciélagos debt)	3,000	500	100	250	−74.8%
20	UAZ	2,350	500	100	214	−11.9%
21	UACH (Note: The team played the matches against Atlético Reynosa and Tepatitlán at Estadio Olímpico Municipal, Ciudad Cuauhtémoc, Chihuahua)	2,100	500	100	195	−43.1%
22	Marina	1,720	500	100	172	+11.7%^{1}
23	UNAM	1,550	300	100	141	+11.0%
24	UAT	1,400	300	50	140	−20.9%
25	Albinegros de Orizaba (Note: Orizaba played only the first half of the season.)	900	200	100	129	−44.6%
26	Atlético San Luis	1,200	200	50	120	n/a^{2}
27	Leones Negros	1,350	250	50	113	−42.6%
28	Sporting Canamy	1,050	200	50	105	−37.9%
29	Cimarrones	1,000	200	50	83	−41.5%
	League total	341,700	12,000	0	1,102	+15.5%

Updated to games played on 14 March 2020
Source: Liga Premier FMF
Notes:
Only regular season listed
1: Team played in Serie B de México last season.
2: New team.
3: Team played as Ocelotes UNACH at San Cristóbal de las Casas last season.

==== Highest and lowest ====
Highest attendance					Lowest attendance			
Week	Home	Score	Away	Attendance	Home	Score	Away	Attendance
1	Irapuato	1–1	Pioneros	12,000	UAT	1–0	UAZ	50
2	Saltillo	1–1	UAT	7,000	Orizaba	3–2	CAFESSA Jalisco	100
3	Irapuato	3–2	Atlético San Luis	10,000	Sporting Canamy	1–2	Tlaxcala	100
4	Saltillo	1–1	Cimarrones de Sonora	3,000	Mineros de Fresnillo	1–1	Tecos	100
5	Irapuato	3–2	UNAM	5,000	Cimarrones de Sonora	0–0	Mineros de Fresnillo	50
6	Saltillo	1–1	Leones Negros	5,000	Marina	0–1	CAFESSA Jalisco	100
7	Irapuato	1–0	Yalmakán	12,000	Cimarrones de Sonora	2–2	Atlético Bahía	50
8	Tlaxcala	0–1	Irapuato	2,200	Atlético San Luis	0–1	CAFESSA Jalisco	50
9	Irapuato	2–3	La Piedad	8,000	Orizaba	0–2	Pioneros	100
10	Atlético Reynosa	3–0	Gavilanes de Matamoros	3,000	Atlético San Luis	0–1	Orizaba	50
11	Irapuato	1–0	Sporting Canamy	10,000	Mineros de Fresnillo	0–2	Murciélagos	100
12 (Note: Only Group A teams had matches this week)	Tepatitlán	5–0	Leones Negros	2,000	UAT	0–2	Tecos	100
13	Irapuato	3–0	Marina	8,000	Sporting Canamy	0–2	CAFESSA Jalisco	50
14	Tlaxcala	1–2	UNAM	2,000	Cruz Azul Hidalgo	0–0	Yalmakán	100
15	Saltillo	0–1	Coras de Nayarit	2,000	UAZ	1–1	Durango	100
16	Saltillo	0–0	Durango	3,000	Mineros de Fresnillo	0–3	Coras de Nayarit	100
17	Tlaxcala	2–0	Yalmakán	1,500	Cimarrones de Sonora	4–3	Leones Negros	50
18	Irapuato	0–0	Pioneros de Cancún	12,000	Sporting Canamy	1–0	Cruz Azul Hidalgo	50
19	Tepatitlán	4–0	Atlético Reynosa	3,800	Cimarrones de Sonora	2–4	Saltillo	50
20	Saltillo	1–3	Gavilanes de Matamoros	5,000	Sporting Canamy	2–2	Cafetaleros de Chiapas	50
21	Gavilanes de Matamoros	2–0	Mineros de Fresnillo	3,000	Leones Negros	2–1	Saltillo	50
22	Irapuato	4–4	Cruz Azul Hidalgo	10,000	Atlético Bahía	2–0	Cimarrones de Sonora	100
23	Tlaxcala	0–1	Cruz Azul Hidalgo	5,000	Leones Negros	1–3	Murciélagos	50
24	Irapuato	2–2	Tlaxcala	10,000	Sporting Canamy	0–4	UNAM	100
25 (Note: Only five games were played with supporters assistance due to precautionary measures against the COVID-19 pandemic)	Gavilanes	2–2	Atlético Reynosa	9,000	Cimarrones de Sonora	0–5	Tepatitlán	100

Source: Liga Premier FMF

=== Coefficients table ===
To determine the seeding of the teams qualified to the playoff phase, a table of coefficients is used, in which the points obtained are divided between the matches played. Generally, this same table is used to determine the team relegated to Serie B, however, in the 2019–2020 season the category relegation was suspended.

P	Team	Pts	G	Pts/G	GD
1	Tepatitlán	62	23	2.6957	+21
2	Tlaxcala	49	20	2.4500	+16
3	UAZ	56	24	2.3333	+23
4	Atlético Reynosa	53	23	2.3043	+31
5	Atlético Irapuato	44	20	2.2000	+15
6	Gavilanes	48	23	2.0870	+26
7	Durango	46	23	2.0000	+24
8	Coras de Nayarit	44	22	2.0000	+11
9	CAFESSA Jalisco	37	20	1.8500	+6
10	Pioneros de Cancún	35	20	1.7500	+11
11	UACH	38	23	1.6522	+6
12	UNAM	34	21	1.6190	+6
13	Cruz Azul Hidalgo	32	20	1.6000	+11
14	Murciélagos	39	24	1.6250	+9
15	Saltillo	37	24	1.5417	+5
16	Inter Playa del Carmen	27	20	1.3500	+6
17	Yalmakán	28	21	1.3333	–5
18	La Piedad	27	21	1.2857	–7
19	Cafetaleros de Chiapas	25	20	1.2500	–8
20	Marina	25	20	1.2500	–14
21	Tecos	25	22	1.1364	–11
22	UAT	21	23	0.9130	–15
23	Leones Negros	17	23	0.7391	–19
24	Atlético Bahía	15	24	0.6250	–68
25	Sporting Canamy	12	20	0.6000	–17
26	Atlético San Luis	12	21	0.5714	–20
27	Mineros de Fresnillo	13	24	0.5417	–26
28	Cimarrones de Sonora	12	23	0.5217	–35

Last updated: March 15, 2020
Source: Liga Premier FMF
P = Position; G = Games played; Pts = Points; Pts/G = Ratio of points to games played; GD = Goal difference

== Serie B ==
=== Changes from the previous season ===
Below are listed the member clubs of the Serie B for the 2019–20 season.

- Gladiadores dissolved and renamed to Deportivo Dongu F.C.
- La Paz will participate in the Serie B as an expansion team.
- Zitácuaro and Chapulineros de Oaxaca will rejoin the league after one year on hiatus.
- Sporting Canamy reactivated its on hiatus franchise and created Real Canamy Tlayacapan, a reserve team.
- Atlético San Francisco and Aguacateros CDU were promoted from Liga TDP.
- Marina was promoted to Serie A as 2018-19 Serie B winner.
- Atlético Saltillo Soccer, CAFESSA and Mineros de Fresnillo were accepted as new teams in Serie A.
- Celaya Premier and Constructores de Gómez Palacio dissolved.
- Sahuayo were relocated in Liga TDP by their board.
- Ocelotes UNACH reached an agreement with Cafetaleros de Chiapas, the team was promoted to Serie A, but moved to Tapachula and was renamed as Cafetaleros de Chiapas Premier.
- FC Potosino will not play this season. Originally, this team had signed an agreement to move to Salamanca, Guanajuato and be renamed to Salamanca F.C., however, the Mexican Football Federation did not give its authorization for this change because the new field did not comply with the guidelines for participation in the league.

==== Teams information ====
Location of teams in the 2019–20 Serie B

Club	Manager	City	Stadium	Capacity	Affiliate
ACD Uruapan	(Mexico) José Roberto Muñoz	Uruapan, Michoacán	Unidad Deportiva Hermanos López Rayón	5,000	—
Atlético San Francisco	(Mexico) Emanuell Alvarado	San Francisco del Rincón, Guanajuato	Domingo Velázquez	3,500	—
CAFESSA	(Mexico) Paulo César Chávez	Tlajomulco de Zúñiga, Jalisco	Unidad Deportiva Mariano Otero	3,000	CAFESSA Jalisco
Calor	(Mexico) Pedro Muñoz	Monclova, Coahuila	Unidad Deportiva Nora Leticia Rocha	4,000	—
Chapulineros de Oaxaca	(Mexico) Jesús López Meneses	San Jerónimo Tlacochahuaya, Oaxaca	Independiente MRCI	3,000	—
Ciervos	(Mexico) Pablo Robles	Chalco de Díaz Covarrubias, State of Mexico	Arreola	2,500	—
Cuautla	(Mexico) Carlos González	Cuautla, Morelos	Isidro Gil Tapia	5,000	—
Dongu	(Mexico) René Fuentes	Cuautitlán, State of Mexico	Los Pinos	5,000	—
Dorados de Sinaloa	(Mexico) Marco Marroquín	Navolato, Sinaloa	Deportivo Juventud	2,000	Dorados de Sinaloa
La Paz	(Mexico) Omar Moreno	La Paz, Baja California Sur	Guaycura	5,209	—
Mineros de Zacatecas	(Mexico) Esteban Vega	Zacatecas, Zacatecas	Universitario Unidad Deportiva Norte	5,000	Mineros de Zacatecas
Nuevo Chimalhuacán	(Mexico) Edgar Jiménez	Chimalhuacán, State of Mexico	La Laguna	2,000	—
Real Canamy Tlayacapan	(Mexico) Miguel Ángel Limón	Oaxtepec, Morelos	Olímpico de Oaxtepec	9,000	Sporting Canamy
Zitácuaro	(Argentina) Leonardo Pipino	Zitácuaro, Michoacán	Ignacio López Rayón	10,000	—

=== Season development ===
==== Standings ====
Pos	Team	Pld	W	D	L	GF	GA	GD	BP	Pts
1	Mineros de Zacatecas	23	10	9	4	59	30	+29	9	48
2	ACD Uruapan	23	12	7	4	41	19	+22	5	48
3	Atlético San Francisco	23	13	4	6	40	22	+18	2	45
4	La Paz	23	11	6	6	49	34	+15	5	44
5	Calor	23	10	9	4	34	25	+9	4	43
6	Cuautla	23	11	6	6	35	22	+13	3	42
7	CAFESSA	23	11	4	8	43	28	+15	2	39
8	Chapulineros de Oaxaca	23	10	6	7	36	26	+10	2	38
9	Real Canamy Tlayacapan	23	9	6	8	38	41	−3	3	36
10	Zitácuaro	23	8	5	10	22	29	−7	1	30
11	Dorados de Sinaloa	23	8	4	11	27	33	−6	1	29
12	Dongu	23	5	4	14	23	43	−20	1	20
13	Ciervos	23	5	1	17	21	59	−38	1	17
14	Nuevo Chimalhuacán	23	1	3	19	15	72	−57	0	6

Updated to match(es) played on 14 March 2020. Source: Liga Premier FMF

==== Positions by round ====
Leader and qualification to quarter-finals
Qualification to quarter-finals
Last place in table

Team ╲ Round	1	2	3	4	5	6	7	8	9	10	11	12	13	14	15	16	17	18	19	20	21	22	23
M. Zacatecas	1	4	6	7	3	5	3	3	3	4	3	1	1	1	1	1	1	1	1	2	1	2	1
ACD Uruapan	4	2	3	6	2	1	2	2	1	1	2	3	2	3	2	2	2	5	5	3	2	3	2
AS Francisco	12	8	5	2	6	2	1	1	2	2	1	2	3	2	4	4	5	3	2	1	3	1	3
La Paz (Note: Team with a pending match between weeks 14 and 15)	3	1	2	1	5	7	7	7	6	6	9	7	5	6	3	3	3	2	3	4	4	4	4
Calor	6	5	11	11	11	10	8	9	10	8	7	8	6	4	5	7	6	4	4	5	5	5	5
Cuautla	11	12	9	5	8	9	9	6	8	10	6	4	7	7	7	6	7	6	6	6	6	6	6
CAFESSA	7	10	8	8	10	8	6	5	4	3	4	6	8	9	9	10	9	9	10	9	9	7	7
Chapulineros	2	7	12	12	12	12	12	13	9	9	8	5	4	5	6	5	4	7	7	7	8	8	8
Real Canamy	13	9	10	10	9	11	11	11	12	12	11	11	10	10	11	11	11	10	9	8	7	9	9
Zitácuaro	5	6	4	4	1	3	5	8	7	7	10	10	11	11	10	9	10	11	11	11	11	11	10
D. Sinaloa	9	11	7	9	7	4	4	4	5	5	5	9	9	8	8	8	8	8	8	10	10	10	11
Dongu	8	3	1	3	4	6	10	10	11	11	12	12	13	13	13	12	12	13	12	12	12	12	12
Ciervos	14	14	14	13	14	14	14	12	13	13	13	13	12	12	12	13	13	12	13	13	13	13	13
Chimalhuacán	10	13	13	14	13	13	13	14	14	14	14	14	14	14	14	14	14	14	14	14	14	14	14

Updated to match(es) played on 15 April 2020. Source: Liga Premier FMF

==== Results ====
Each team plays once all other teams in 26 rounds regardless of it being a home or away match.

Home \ Away	ADU	ASF	CAF	CLR	CHA	CIE	CUA	DON	SIN	LPZ	MDZ	NCH	RCT	ZIT
ACD Uruapan	—	0–0	1–0	0–0	3–1	3–1	0–0	2–0	3–0	1–2	1–1	9–0	—	2–2
AS Francisco	0–2	—	2–1	4–1	1–2	3–1	—	1–0	1–0	1–1	3–2	4–1	4–2	2–1
CAFESSA	—	—	—	0–1	0–1	6–1	1–1	5–2	0–0	2–1	1–0	6–0	0–2	3–3
Calor	—	1–0	3–3	—	0–0	2–0	2–3	—	3–0	3–0	2–2	3–0	1–1	1–0
Chapulineros	0–1	—	0–1	0–1	—	3–0	2–2	3–2	4–0	1–1	1–1	—	2–0	1–1
Ciervos	0–2	0–1	0–4	2–2	—	—	1–4	2–3	1–0	0–3	1–0	2–0	0–2	2–0
Cuautla	1–2	1–0	1–0	4–0	3–1	—	—	1–0	1–0	3–2	0–0	2–2	—	1–0
Dongu	2–2	1–1	0–1	1–2	0–4	4–1	2–1	—	1–1	—	0–2	2–1	1–1	0–1
D. Sinaloa	1–1	1–0	1–2	1–1	1–2	4–1	1–0	2–0	—	0–2	—	5–2	0–2	4–1
La Paz	2–3	0–1	2–1	—	4–1	2–0	2–2	7–0	—	—	1–4	3–2	1–1	1–1
M. Zacatecas	3–0	2–2	5–0	3–3	3–3	8–1	2–1	—	5–2	2–3	—	—	3–3	1–0
Chimalhuacán	1–3	1–3	0–4	0–0	0–1	2–1	0–2	0–2	0–2	0–3	0–6	—	2–3	—
R. Canamy	1–0	0–6	—	0–2	0–3	1–3	2–1	1–0	0–1	5–5	2–2	5–0	—	3–2
Zitácuaro	1–0	1–0	1–2	1–0	1–0	—	1–0	1–0	—	0–2	0–2	1–1	2–1	—

Updated to match(es) played on 15 April 2020. Source: Liga Premier FMF
Legend: Blue = home team win; Yellow = draw; Red = away team win.

=== Regular season statistics ===
==== Top goalscorers ====
Players sorted first by goals scored, then by last name.

Rank	Player	Club	Goals
1	(Mexico) Illian Hernández	Mineros de Zacatecas	22
2	(Mexico) Aldo Suárez	La Paz	12
3	(Mexico) Francisco Mendoza	ACD Uruapan	11
3	(Mexico) Carlos Navarro	Cuautla / ACD Uruapan	11
3	(Mexico) Roberto Flores	CAFESSA	11
6	(Mexico) Cristian Martínez	Calor	10
7	(Mexico) Alonso Hernández	Calor	9
7	(Mexico) Jorge Longgy	Atlético San Francisco	9
9	(Mexico) Emmanuel Cabrera	Ciervos	8
10	(Mexico) David Arteaga	Chapulineros de Oaxaca	7
10	(Mexico) Fernando Moreno	La Paz	7
10	(Mexico) Omar Reyna	Zitácuaro	7
10	(Mexico) Kevin Verduzco	Dorados de Sinaloa	7
10	(Mexico) Sergio Rivera	Atlético San Francisco	7
10	(Mexico) Luis Hernández	Mineros de Zacatecas	7

Source:Liga Premier – Serie B

==== Hat-tricks ====
Player	For	Against	Result	Date	Round	Reference
(Mexico) Brayam López	Mineros de Zacatecas	Ciervos	8–1 (H)	17 August 2019	1	
(Mexico) Francisco Mendoza	ACD Uruapan	Nuevo Chimalhuacán	9–0 (H)	5 October 2019	8	
(Mexico) Roberto Flores	CAFESSA	Nuevo Chimalhuacán	0–4 (A)	12 October 2019	9	
(Mexico) Aldo Suárez	La Paz	Dongu	7–0 (H)	9 November 2019	12	
(Mexico) Carlos Casas	Mineros de Zacatecas	Nuevo Chimalhuacán	0–6 (A)	16 November 2019	13	
(Mexico) César González	CAFESSA	Dongu	5–2 (H)	21 February 2020	20	
(Mexico) Pablo César Padilla	Atlético San Francisco	Real Canamy	0–6 (A)	7 March 2020	22	

(H) – Home; (A) – Away

=== Attendance ===
==== Per team ====
Pos	Team	Total	High	Low	Average	Change
1	La Paz	20,490	3,300	0	2,049	n/a^{1}
2	ACD Uruapan (Note: Match against Chapulineros de Oaxaca was played behind closed doors due to a penalty by the Mexican Football Federation.)	8,750	2,500	0	795	n/a^{1}
3	Cuautla	8,650	3,000	200	786	+100.0%
4	Atlético San Francisco	7,400	1,000	100	617	n/a^{1}
5	Calor	5,150	800	100	486	−58.2%
6	Zitácuaro	4,650	1,100	200	423	+27.0%^{2}
7	Chapulineros de Oaxaca	4,050	2,000	50	368	+30.0%^{2}
8	CAFESSA	3,000	500	100	273	+25.8%
9	Dongu	3,300	500	100	275	+30.3%^{3}
10	Real Canamy (Note: Match against Chapulineros de Oaxaca was suspended by FMF due to Real Canamy debt)	2,130	1,000	50	213	n/a^{1}
11	Nuevo Chimalhuacán (Note: One match played at Estadio 1966, Tezontepec de Aldama, Hidalgo) (Note: Match against La Paz was suspended by FMF due to Nuevo Chimalhuacán debt)	1,760	500	0	160	+60.0%
12	Ciervos	1,850	400	0	175	−2.8%
13	Dorados de Sinaloa	1,410	200	50	128	+19.6%
14	Mineros de Zacatecas	1,050	200	50	95	+26.7%
	League total	74,240	3,300	0	470	+36.6%

Updated to games played on 14 March 2020
Source: Liga Premier FMF
Notes:
Only regular season listed
1: Team played in Liga TDP last season or new team.
2: Team on hiatus last season, so, the previous tournament was Clausura 2018.
3: Team played last season as Deportivo Gladiadores F.C.

==== Highest and lowest ====
Highest attendance					Lowest attendance			
Week	Home	Score	Away	Attendance	Home	Score	Away	Attendance
1	La Paz	3–2	Nuevo Chimalhuacán	3,000	Mineros de Zacatecas	8–1	Ciervos	150
2	Ciervos	0–3	La Paz	400	ACD Uruapan	3–1	Chapulineros	0
3	La Paz	0–1	San Francisco	3,000	Mineros de Zacatecas	3–3	Real Canamy	100
4	ACD Uruapan	1–1	Mineros de Zacatecas	850	Nuevo Chimalhuacán	0–0	Calor	100
5	La Paz	2–3	ACD Uruapan	2,336	Nuevo Chimalhuacán	2–1	Ciervos	0
6	Chapulineros	1–1	Zitácuaro	2,000	San Francisco	4–1	Nuevo Chimalhuacán	100
7	La Paz	2–2	Cuautla	1,500	Dongu	0–1	CAFESSA	100
8	ACD Uruapan	9–0	Nuevo Chimalhuacán	1,000	Real Canamy	1–3	Ciervos	100
9	La Paz	1–1	Zitácuaro	1,154	Nuevo Chimalhuacán	0–4	CAFESSA	100
10	ACD Uruapan	0–0	San Francisco	2,500	Chapulineros	4–0	Dorados de Sinaloa	100
11	San Francisco	2–1	CAFESSA	1,000	Calor	3–0	La Paz	100
12	La Paz	7–0	Dongu	1,700	Chapulineros	3–0	Ciervos	50
13	San Francisco	1–2	Chapulineros	1,000	Ciervos	2–0	Zitácuaro	100
14	San Francisco	2–1	Zitácuaro	1,000	Dorados de Sinaloa	2–0	Dongu	100
15	La Paz	2–0	Ciervos	1,500	Chapulineros	0–1	ACD Uruapan	50
16	Cuautla	4–0	Calor	1,050	Nuevo Chimalhuacán	0–2	Dorados de Sinaloa	50
17	La Paz	1–1	Real Canamy	1,000	Mineros de Zacatecas	3–0	ACD Uruapan	50
18	San Francisco	1–0	Dorados de Sinaloa	1,000	Chapulineros	0–1	Calor	50
19	La Paz	2–1	CAFESSA	2,000	Mineros de Zacatecas	2–1	Cuautla	50
20	Cuautla	3–1	La Paz	1,000	Chapulineros	1–1	Mineros de Zacatecas	100
21	La Paz	4–1	Chapulineros	3,300	Mineros de Zacatecas	1–0	Zitácuaro	50
22	Cuautla	1–0	Dorados de Sinaloa	1,000	Mineros de Zacatecas	3–3	Calor	50
23 (Note: Only five games were played with supporters assistance due to precautionary measures against the COVID-19 pandemic)	San Francisco	0–2	ACD Uruapan	1,000	Nuevo Chimalhuacán	0–2	Cuautla	10

Source: Liga Premier FMF
