= José Calderón =

José Calderón is the name of:

- José Luis Calderón (born 1970), Argentine footballer
- José Calderón (Panamanian footballer) (born 1985), Panamanian footballer
- José Luis Calderón Cabrera (1924–2004), Mexican architect
- José Calderón (basketball) (born 1981), Spanish basketball player
- José Calderón (Mexican footballer) (born 1993), Mexican footballer

== See also ==
- José Manuel Calderón (disambiguation)
