= Édgar Benítez (Mexican footballer) =

Mexican footballer (born 1998)

Personal information
- Full name: Édgar Armando Benítez Delgado
- Date of birth: 26 March 1998 (age 28)
- Place of birth: Tampico, Tamaulipas, Mexico
- Height: 1.78 m (5 ft 10 in)
- Position: Defender

Youth career
- 2013–2017: UAT
- 2015: → Monterrey (loan)

Senior career*
Years	Team	Apps	(Gls)
2017–2022	UAT	40	(1)
2018–2019	→ Irapuato (loan)	28	(2)
2019–2020	→ Atlético Reynosa (loan)	18	(0)
- * Club domestic league appearances and goals as of 3 February 2022

Édgar Armando Benítez Delgado (born 26 March 1998) is a Mexican footballer who plays as a defender.
