= Eduardo Sayun =

Mexican footballer (born 1992)

Personal information
- Full name: Eduardo Javier Sayun Pallares
- Date of birth: August 6, 1992 (age 34)
- Place of birth: Querétaro City, Mexico
- Height: 1.72 m (5 ft 8 in)
- Position: Midfielder

Team information
- Current team: Retirado
- Number: 23

Senior career*
Years	Team	Apps	(Gls)
2012–2013	Querétaro F.C.	6	(0)
2013–2014	Estudiantes de Altamira	9	(0)
2014	Querétaro F.C.	8	(0)
2015	Atlético Chiapas	9	(2)
2015–	Reynosa F.C.	3	(1)
- * Club domestic league appearances and goals as of 9 January 2016

Eduardo Javier Sayun Pallares (born August 6, 1992), known as Eduardo Sayun, is a Mexican association football (soccer) player who currently plays for Reynosa F.C.
