= Luis Solorio =

Mexican footballer (born 1994)

Personal information
- Full name: Luis Alfonso Solorio Gutiérrez
- Date of birth: August 1, 1994 (age 32)
- Place of birth: Guadalajara, Jalisco, Mexico
- Height: 1.83 m (6 ft 0 in)
- Position: Centre-back

Senior career*
Years	Team	Apps	(Gls)
2015–2019	Guadalajara	0	(0)
2015–2016	→ Coras (loan)	17	(0)
2018–2019	→ Zacatepec (loan)	11	(0)
2019–2020	Cafetaleros de Chiapas Premier	12	(0)
2022	Tampico Madero	0	(0)

International career
- Mexico U17
Medal record
Representing Mexico
First place	FIFA U-17 World Cup	2011 Mexico
- * Club domestic league appearances and goals

Luis Alfonso Solorio Gutiérrez (born 1 August 1994) is a Mexican professional footballer who last played as a centre-back for Tampico Madero.

== Honours ==
Mexico U17

- FIFA U-17 World Cup: 2011
