= Luis García (footballer, born 1964) =

Mexican footballer and manager

Personal information
- Full name: Luis Francisco García Llamas
- Date of birth: 4 April 1964 (age 62)
- Place of birth: Guadalajara, Jalisco, Mexico
- Height: 1.78 m (5 ft 10 in)
- Position: Defender

Team information
- Current team: Necaxa U18 (Manager)

Senior career*
Years	Team	Apps	(Gls)
1983–1989	Atlas		
1989–1992	Toluca		
1993–1994	U. de G.		
1994–1995	UAT		
1997–1998	Veracruz		
1999–2000	Cruz Azul	34	(0)
1999	→ Guadalajara (loan)	1	(0)
2001–2002	La Piedad	17	(0)
2003	Celaya	4	(0)
2003–2004	Sinaloa	21	(0)

International career^{‡}
1983	Mexico U20	3	(0)
1983–1984	Mexico	3	(0)

Managerial career
- 2005: Tijuana (Assistant)
- 2008: Necaxa Rayos
- 2008: Veracruz (Assistant)
- 2009–2010: Atlas 3a
- 2010–2011: Necaxa U17 & U20
- 2011: Necaxa
- 2011–2013: Necaxa Rayos
- 2014: Necaxa (Assistant)
- 2014–2015: U. de G. U20
- 2015–2016: Atotonilco F.C.
- 2015: UAT (Assistant)
- 2016–2017: Necaxa U20
- 2018: Atlético Reynosa (Assistant)
- 2018–2019: Atlético San Luis (Assistant)
- 2019–2020: Atlético San Luis U-20
- 2019: Atlético San Luis (Interim)
- 2020–2021: Atlético San Luis Premier
- 2020: Atlético San Luis (Interim)
- 2021: Atlético San Luis Reserves and Academy
- 2022: Correcaminos UAT (Assistant)
- 2022–: Necaxa U18
- * Club domestic league appearances and goals as of October 2019 ‡ National team caps and goals as of 22 May 2025

Luis Francisco García Llamas (Note: In this Spanish name, the first or paternal surname is García and the second or maternal family name is Llamas.) (born 4 April 1964) is a Mexican football manager and former player. Since 27 October 2019 is the Atlético San Luis interim manager.
