= Alexis Moreno =

Mexican football manager (born 1989)

Personal information
- Full name: Omar Alexis Moreno Galindo
- Date of birth: 1 November 1989 (age 36)
- Place of birth: Mexico City, Mexico
- Height: 1.74 m (5 ft 9 in)

Senior career*
Years	Team	Apps	(Gls)
2007	San Mateo Atenco	4	(0)
2008–09	Tultitlán	18	(0)

Managerial career
- 2012–2014: Panteras de Lindavista (Assistant)
- 2019–2020: La Paz
- 2020–2023: Mineros de Zacatecas
- 2025: Deportivo Coopsol
- * Club domestic league appearances and goals

Omar Alexis Moreno Galindo (born 1 November 1989) is a Mexican football manager and former player. He was born in Mexico City.

During his career as a footballer, he played for only two teams in the Tercera División de México, San Mateo Atenco and Tultitlán. Subsequently, began his career on the bench in clubs Panteras de Lindavista and Selva Cañera, and later went on to collaborate with Alebrijes de Oaxaca, where he became the youngest technical assistant in Mexican football.

In June 2019, Moreno began his career as technical director, being named as the first person in charge of that position in La Paz F.C., team that debuted that year in the Serie B de México. He became a free agent at the end of the season because the team went on hiatus due to the COVID-19 pandemic.

On 1 July 2020, Moreno was appointed as coach of Mineros de Zacatecas, a team that plays in the Liga de Expansión MX. He remained in charge of Mineros until April 2023, when he left the team by mutual agreement with the club.

In March 2025 he was hired by Deportivo Coopsol, a team in the Peruvian Liga 2. However, Moreno was sacked from the club two months after his appointment due to poor performance as the team entered a relegation battle.
