= Ramiro Suárez Corzo =

Ramiro Suárez Corzo (born in Enciso, Santander in 1960) is a Colombian politician. Former Mayor of the Colombian city of Cúcuta, Norte de Santander and actually is a convicted Murderer.

== Early life ==
Suárez-Corzo was born in Enciso, Santander Department to a humble family. He started working at a very young age. At age 11 he left Enciso to Bogotá where he worked on many jobs, including automotive maintenance. In the mid 1970s he then moved to Cúcuta where he worked in construction, security guard, cab driver and neighborhood community leader.

He later became chauffeur of a congressman named Mario Said Lamk Valencia member of the National Salvation Movement led by conservative leader Álvaro Gómez Hurtado. During this time (1982) he became good friends with Ángel Uriel García, then Municipal Secretary of Finance and Jorge García Herreros one of the most influential conservative politicians in the region. For the 2001 elections Suárez had increased his political influence and power and supported Manuel Guillermo Mora for mayor of Cúcuta, office for which Mora was ultimately elected. In 2003 Suárez then run for Mayor of Cúcuta and was popularly elected with 127,800 votes.

== Legal problems ==
=== Paramilitarism ===
On June 29, 2004, Suárez was captured in Cúcuta for having ties with the United Self-Defense Forces of Colombia (AUC) paramilitary group. On January 6, 2005 was set in a trial and accused of meeting with paramilitaries to support them, among them one known by alias of "El Gato". On March 4, 2005 an attorney appealed the decision and the investigation ended.

On April 4, 2007, the demobilized paramilitary John Mario Salazar aka. "El Pecoso" accused Suárez of the being the mastermind behind the assassination of José Agustín Uribe, who worked for the Government of Norte de Santander as a Judicial Advisor. In May, 2007 Salvatore Mancuso the detained paramilitary leader of the demobilized AUC paramilitary group that he had agreed to support Suárez' election for Mayor of Cúcuta. Suárez denied all these allegations saying that these were all lies from a delinquent and that he had never met Mancuso in his life.

Another captured paramilitary leader named Jorge Iván Laverde aka "El Iguano", member of the AUC Frontier Front testified that Suarez-Corzo had asked the AUC paramilitary group to kill as a favor the former adviser to the city of Cucuta, Alfredo Enrique Flórez. Suárez testified for both cases alleging the same defense arguments, declaring himself innocent and unrelated to paramilitary groups. Suerez Corzo accused the emerging paramilitary group Águilas Negras of being behind the accusations against him as retaliation for combating them.

=== Cúcuta Deportivo ===
Suárez as Mayor of Cúcuta was supposedly managing the football (soccer) team Cúcuta Deportivo indirectly overriding the president of this club Angel Uriel Garcia. According to El Tiempo newspaper Suárez was supposed to sell part of the team's stocks to the people of Cúcuta, 8.5% of the total 70%, instead he sold that 70% to his friends. He also authorized Cúcuta to be exempt of taxes until the year 2010, when the Colombian law only allows 1 year to do so.
