= José Manuel Calderón =

José Manuel Calderón may refer to:

- José Calderón (basketball) (born 1981), Spanish basketball executive and former player
- José Manuel Calderón (musician) (born 1941), Dominican musician
- José Manuel Calderón (footballer) (born 2000), Spanish footballer
- José Manuel Calderón (politician), Chilean politician, Secretary of the Navy during the rule of Francisco Ramón Vicuña

== See also ==
- José Calderón (disambiguation)
