= Cúcuta Deportivo =

Professional Colombian football team based in Cúcuta

- Full name: Cúcuta Deportivo Fútbol Club S. A.
- Nicknames: El Doblemente Glorioso (The Doubly Glorious), Los Motilones (The Motilons), Los Rojinegros (The Red and Blacks), El Equipo Fronterizo (The Border Team), La Furia Motilona (The Motilon Wrath)
- Founded: 10 September 1924; 102 years ago
- Ground: General Santander
- Capacity: 42,901
- Owner: José Augusto Cadena Mora
- President: Wilmar Sánchez
- Head coach: Nicolás Chiesa
- League: Categoría Primera A
- 2025: Primera B, 2nd of 16 (Torneo II champions, promoted)
- Website: www.cucutadeportivofc.com
Home colours	Away colours	Third colours

Cúcuta Deportivo Fútbol Club S. A. (Spanish pronounced [ˈkukuta ðepoɾˈtiβo fuðˈbol ˈkluβ]), commonly referred to as Cúcuta Deportivo, is a professional Colombian football club from the city of Cúcuta. Founded on 10 September 1924, it is one of the oldest active football clubs in the country; specifically the fourth oldest club. The club plays its home games at the Estadio General Santander, with a capacity for 42,000 spectators. It currently plays in Categoría Primera A, the first level of the Colombian football league system.

Identified by its red and black colors – by which they are known as the rojinegros, Cúcuta Deportivo is one of Colombia's historical clubs. The club won its first Primera A championship in the 2006–II season. It also has four Second Division titles, won in the 1995–96, 2005, 2018 and 2025–II seasons. It participated in the 2007 Copa Libertadores, achieving an outstanding continental performance by reaching the semi-finals, stage in which it faced Boca Juniors, eventual champions of the tournament; and in the 2008 Copa Libertadores, achieving another good participation, in which it reached the round of 16, stage in which it lost to Brazilian side Santos.

In 2012, the IFFHS published a ranking of clubs in South America with statistical data from 2001 to 2012, in which Cúcuta was highlighted as one of the best Colombian teams, ranked 92nd at continental level in the 21st century. It also ranks 146th in the all-time club world rankings according to the IFFHS, being the fifth best placed Colombian team on the list.

Its classic rival is Atlético Bucaramanga, against which it plays in the Clásico del Oriente Colombiano in which it leads the all-time series of clashes. Cúcuta has one of the largest fanbases in the country.

== History ==
=== Early years ===
There is some dispute regarding the founding year of Cúcuta Deportivo, but according to historian Alfredo Díaz, the club was founded on 10 September 1924 as Cúcuta Sports Club. The club's first games outside of Colombia were against a team composed of players representing Caracas, Venezuela on 23 November 1926. Two days later, on 25 November, the team played in La Guaira, Venezuela. Cúcuta Sports Club became the base of the Norte de Santander football team that took part in the first Colombian National Games (Juegos Deportivos Nacionales de Colombia) in 1928 in the city of Cali.

On 15 May 1949, the president of the Colombian football league invited the directors of Club Colpet, Chinaquillo, Guasimales, and Unión Frontera to strengthen Cúcuta Deportivo to compete in the new Colombian professional football league. To facilitate the economic reforms required to join the league, Hernando Lara Hernández bought 1,700 shares in the club in September of the same year.

Between September and November 1949, before beginning its first campaign in the Colombian league, Cúcuta played Huracán de Medellín, Universidad de Bogotá, Boca Juniors de Cali, and Atlético Bucaramanga. The latter of these, Atlético Bucaramanga, is Cúcuta's arch rival, and their games are called the clásico of Eastern Colombia.

=== 1950–1994: Economic crisis, league runner-up ===
In 1950, Cúcuta played in the professional league with a team consisting of 12 Uruguayan players.

During its first professional season, Cúcuta won its first game against the now-defunct Sporting de Barranquilla (2–1), and also defeated Atlético Bucaramanga (0–1) at Atlético's ground in the first clásico of Eastern Colombia. Luis Albert "the Martian" Miloc scored the game's only goal. Cúcuta finished the year in fifth place out of 16 teams. More Uruguayan players were brought in for the 1951–52 season, including Schubert Gambetta and Eusebio Tejera. Cúcuta finished the following year in third place out of 18 teams.

Between 1952 and 1953, the club found itself in its first economic crisis. Resolved not to be disbanded, the team's directors organized an exhibition tour in Central America. The team played in Costa Rica, El Salvador, and Guatemala and earned enough money to maintain its league status, which it succeeded in doing for two seasons. By 1954 the crisis had grown and the club was forced to exit the Colombian league for two years, returning in 1956. Cúcuta finished fourth in the league that year. Rolando Serrano, the earliest of the great local heroes, began his career at Cúcuta. Serrano later helped the Colombia national team qualify for the 1962 World Cup.

In 1964, Cúcuta turned in their second best season-long performance to date. Under the management of Marino Vargas Villalta, Cúcuta finished second in the Colombian league, a single point behind champions Millonarios.

=== Relegation ===
In 1995, after finishing in 16th place in the league, Cúcuta was relegated to the second division, Categoría Primera B. One year later, however, the team won the second division title and returned to the top flight, only to be promptly relegated after finishing in last place. Despite finishing second in the Primera B in 1997 to Atlético Huila, Cúcuta failed to win promotion in the league's playoffs, and remained in the second division until 2005. That year they were finally crowned Primera B champions and returned to the top flight.

=== The first star ===
Under manager Jorge Luis Pinto, Cúcuta qualified to the finals against Deportes Tolima, which would be played over two legs. The first game in Cucuta on 17 December ended in a 1–0 victory for Cucuta, with Rodrigo Saraz scoring the only goal of the game. In the return leg in Ibagué three days later, Yulián Anchico opened the scoring for Tolima, but with twelve minutes remaining Macnelly Torres scored to tie the game at 1–1. This result meant Cúcuta won 2–1 on aggregate and were crowned champions of the 2006 Finalizacion.

With this title, Cucuta achieved qualification to the Copa Libertadores for the first time in history, and became the first team to win the top division title just one year after promotion.

Some of the key players in this championship were Blas Pérez, Roberto Bobadilla, Charles Castro, Macnelly Torres, Nelson Flórez, Lincarlo Henry, and Róbinson Zapata.

=== 2007 Copa Libertadores ===
Cúcuta were placed in Group 3 of the 2007 Copa Libertadores alongside Deportes Tolima, Grêmio from Brazil, and Cerro Porteño from Paraguay.

The team's first game was a home game against Tolima, a rematch of the 2006 league finals, which ended 0–0. After that they traveled to Porto Alegre to play Grêmio, another game which ended 0–0. For their third match they returned to Colombia to play Cerro Porteño in a match that ended 1–1. The match that followed was against Cerro Porteño at Estadio General Pablo Rojas in Asunción, which ended in a 2–1 loss for Cúcuta. The team rebounded, however, and defeated Grêmio 3–1 at home; for the final group stage match they visited Tolima in Ibagué and won 4–3 in a high-scoring match. This victory ensured their passage into the next round as the second-placed team in the group with 9 points, behind group winners Grêmio, who finished with 10 points.

Their second round matchup was against Mexican club Toluca. After going down 0–1 at home within two minutes, Cúcuta rebounded and won the first leg 5–1. Despite losing the second leg 2–0 in Toluca, Cúcuta advanced to the quarter-finals with a 5–3 victory on aggregate.

The quarter-finals pitted Cúcuta against Uruguayan side Nacional. The first leg was again played in Cúcuta, where the Colombian side won 2–0 through goals by Blas Pérez and Macnelly Torres. The second leg, played in Montevideo, ended in a 2–2 draw thanks to goals from Rubén Darío Bustos and Leonard Pajoy for Cúcuta. Qualification for the semi-finals was earned via this 4–2 aggregate victory.

In the semi-finals, Cúcuta played Argentine powerhouse Boca Juniors. The first leg, in Cúcuta, ended in a 3–1 victory for the Colombians, but in the second leg, at La Bombonera stadium, Boca earned a 3–0 victory to defeat Cúcuta 4–3 on aggregate and advance to the finals, which they subsequently won against Grêmio.

=== 2013–2018: Relegations and promotions ===
The club was relegated to the Categoría Primera B in 2013, after losing the relegation play-off against Fortaleza, and that same year the club entered a business reorganization process under the auspices of the Superintendency of Companies of Colombia to renegotiate its debts with the Cúcuta Municipality and the city's Sports Institute.

For the 2015 season, Cúcuta (at the time playing in the second division) took part in a special tournament to promote two teams to Categoría Primera A, which was being expanded to 20 teams. They were placed in group A along with Atlético Bucaramanga, Deportes Quindío, and Real Cartagena, with the group winners earning promotion. The team beat Real Cartagena 3–0 and got another victory, this time 2–0 against Bucaramanga. These two victories allowed them to play against Quindío for a spot in the top tier. In that last match, Cúcuta only needed a draw to earn promotion because they had a better goal differential. The match ended in a 3–3 draw, allowing the Motilón team to return to Primera A. The team was only able to stay for that season, being relegated again at the end of the year after a poor campaign.

In the 2018 season, Cúcuta placed first in the aggregate table and reached the finals, where the club beat Unión Magdalena 3–0 on aggregate, thus achieving promotion to the Primera A for the 2019 season, where they managed to make it to the semi-finals of the Torneo Finalización, but ended in last place of their group.

=== Liquidation and disaffiliation from Dimayor ===
On 29 November 2019, the Superintendency of Companies of Colombia announced the scheduling of a hearing of breaches on 20 January 2020, since the club had stopped its payments to the local authorities in 2018. In the hearing, postponed to 24 February by mutual agreement, the involved parties reached a payment agreement with the intervention of DIMAYOR president Jorge Enrique Vélez, however, the club continued to default. On 30 July 2020, the Colombian Ministry of Sports announced the suspension of Cúcuta Deportivo's sporting license (reconocimiento deportivo) on account of the club's failure to pay wages to its players. The suspension would be lifted once the club paid its debts; however, an appeal against the decision was lodged by the club. In September, with the return to activity of the Primera A tournament following the COVID-19 pandemic, Cúcuta moved its home games to the Estadio Centenario in Armenia.

On 11 November 2020, the Superintendency of Companies announced the start of the process of liquidation of the club, since it had still failed to meet its commitments to its creditors. The decision, as well as the suspension of the club's sporting license which had been upheld by the Ministry of Sports, forced the club to forfeit its final two matches of the season against América de Cali and Atlético Nacional, as well as their Copa Colombia match against Deportes Tolima, ending the first stage of the season in last place. It also prompted DIMAYOR to exclude the club from the following stage of the competition. Eventually, on 25 November 2020 DIMAYOR's General Assembly voted to disaffiliate the club from the entity, despite the Superintendency of Companies having granted it a four-month license to continue performing its activities.

Having been disaffiliated from DIMAYOR, Cúcuta Deportivo was unable to take part in professional competitions during the 2021 season and only played some friendlies against regional amateur teams. On 23 February 2022 a new business reorganization agreement was reached after a meeting between the club's liquidator and creditors, which included the local authorities of Cúcuta. After electing a new chairman and board, Cúcuta Deportivo was eventually reinstated as a DIMAYOR member on 20 April 2022 following a meeting of the entity's General Assembly, which also decided that the team would enter the Primera B tournament in spite of being in the top tier at the time of its exclusion. The club returned to playing on 10 July 2022 with a defeat to Boca Juniors de Cali.

On 2 December 2025, Cúcuta returned to the top tier after defeating Real Cundinamarca in the finals of the 2025–II season. After a 2–2 draw on aggregate, with Cúcuta missing two penalties in the second leg, they won the penalty shootout to reclaim their place in Colombia's top flight after a six-year absence.

== Support ==
Cúcuta Deportivo has a number of organized fan groups, with the most popular being "La Banda del Indio" and "La Gloriosa Banda Rojinegra." "La Banda del Indio" gets its name as a tribute to the rich local indigenous heritage.

== Honours ==
The achievements of Cúcuta Deportivo include a Primera A title in the 2006 Torneo Finalización and four Primera B titles in the 1995–96, 2005, 2018, and 2025–II seasons, including a first-place finish and promotion in the Promotion Quadrangulars of 2015. In addition to these, the club has won five friendly tournaments: the inaugural tournament of the Estadio Olímpico Atahualpa in 1951, the Copa Internacional Feria del Sol in 2009, the Copa Centenario de Norte de Santander in 2010, the Copa Alcaldía Municipio Pedro María Ureña in 2011, and the Noche Amarilla tournament in 2015. Their best performance in official international competitions was achieved in the 2007 Copa Libertadores, where the team reached the semifinals.

Cúcuta Deportivo honours
Type	Competition	Titles	Seasons
Domestic	Categoría Primera A	1	2006–II
Domestic	Categoría Primera B	4	1995–96, 2005, 2018, 2025–II

=== Other honours ===
- Torneo de Inauguración del Estadio Olímpico Atahualpa:

Champions (1): 1951

- Copa Internacional Feria del Sol:

Champions (1): 2009

- Copa Natalicio del General Santander:

Champions (1): 2009

- Copa Centenario de Norte de Santander:

Champions (1): 2010

- Copa Alcaldía Municipio Pedro María Ureña:

Champions (1): 2011

- Noche Amarilla:

Champions (1): 2015

== Players ==
=== Current squad ===
As of 24 September 2026

Note: Flags indicate national team as defined under FIFA eligibility rules; some limited exceptions apply. Players may hold more than one non-FIFA nationality.

No.	Pos.	Nation	Player
1	GK	COL	Juan David Ramírez
2	DF	ARG	Hernán Lopes
3	DF	ARG	Diego Calcaterra
4	DF	COL	Jhon Quiñones (on loan from Deportes Tolima)
5	MF	COL	Víctor Mejía
6	MF	COL	Santiago Orozco
7	FW	COL	Jader Manyoma
8	MF	COL	Diego Ceballos
9	FW	COL	Jaime Peralta
10	MF	COL	Léider Berdugo
11	FW	COL	Gustavo Torres
12	GK	ARG	Federico Abadía
13	FW	COL	Breyner Rodríguez
14	DF	COL	Kevin Tamayo (on loan from Itagüí Leones)
16	MF	COL	Kevin Londoño

No.	Pos.	Nation	Player
17	DF	COL	Leison Ochoa
20	DF	COL	Dayán Pérez
21	FW	COL	Marlon Carabalí
23	MF	COL	Samir Mayo (on loan from Internacional de Bogotá)
26	DF	COL	Joao Abonía (on loan from Internacional de Bogotá)
27	DF	COL	Mauricio Duarte (captain)
29	MF	ARG	Lucas Ríos
30	DF	COL	Brayan Montaño
31	FW	COL	Jesús Díaz (on loan from Raków Częstochowa)
32	FW	COL	Jonathan Agudelo
33	MF	COL	Sebastián Támara
77	MF	COL	Carlos Rentería
—	GK	COL	Diego Muñoz
—	FW	COL	Hassler Beltrán

== Managers ==
- (Uruguay) Juan Hohberg (January 1962 – December 1963)
- (Colombia) Rolando Serrano (1981)
- (Colombia) Rolando Serrano (1982)
- (Colombia) Nelson Abadía (1983)
- (Colombia) Jaime Rodríguez (1984)
- (Colombia) Rolando Serrano (1985)
- (Colombia) Nelson Abadía (1986–1988)
- (Colombia) Rolando Serrano (1990)
- (Colombia) Fernando Castro (1991)
- (Uruguay) Sergio Santín (1995–1996)
- (Colombia) Eduardo Retat (1998)
- (Colombia) Carlos Hoyos (2004)
- (Colombia) Eduardo Retat (2004–2005)
- (Colombia) Álvaro de Jesús Gómez (2005)
- (Colombia) Jorge Luis Pinto (January 2006 – December 2006)
- (Colombia) Jorge Luis Bernal (January 2007 – December 2007)
- (Colombia) Pedro Sarmiento (January 2008 – August 2008)
- (Uruguay) Aníbal Ruiz (August 2008 – November 2008)
- (Colombia) Jorge Luis Pinto (November 2008 – December 2009)
- (Colombia) Néstor Otero (January 2010 – April 2010)
- (Argentina) Juan Carlos Díaz (April 2010 – July 2011)
- (Colombia) Jaime de la Pava (August 2011 – December 2011)
- (Argentina) Juan Carlos Díaz (January 2012 – March 2012)
- (Argentina) Óscar Quintabani (March 2012 – October 2012)
- (Colombia) Éinar Angulo (October 2012 – November 2012)
- (Uruguay) Guillermo Sanguinetti (November 2012 – July 2013)
- (Colombia) Álvaro Aponte (July 2013 – August 2013)
- (Uruguay) Julio González (August 2013 – December 2013)
- (Colombia) Héctor Estrada Cano (December 2013 – May 2014)
- (Colombia) Alberto Suárez (July 2014 – March 2015)
- (Argentina) Marcelo Fuentes (March 2015 – May 2015)
- (Colombia) Flabio Torres (May 2015 – August 2015)
- (Colombia) Carlos Alberto Quintero (September 2015 – December 2015)
- (Colombia) Miguel Augusto Prince (January 2016 – September 2016)
- (Colombia) Fernando Velasco (September 2016 – March 2017)
- (Argentina) Flavio Robatto (March 2017 – December 2017)
- (Argentina) Lucas Pusineri (January 2018 – December 2018)
- (Argentina) Sebastián Méndez (January 2019 – June 2019)
- (Argentina) Pablo Garabello (July 2019 – August 2019)
- (Uruguay) Guillermo Sanguinetti (August 2019 – December 2019)
- (Colombia) Jairo Patiño (January 2020 – February 2020)
- (Uruguay) Jorge Artigas (February 2020 – November 2020)
- (Colombia) David Suárez (November 2020 – December 2020)
- (Colombia) Aquivaldo Mosquera (May 2022 – September 2022)
- (Colombia) Bernardo Redín (September 2022 – June 2023)
- (Argentina) Rubén Tanucci (June 2023 – September 2023)
- (Argentina) Federico Barrionuevo (September 2023 – April 2024)
- (Colombia) Braynner García (April 2024 – June 2024)
- (Colombia) Álvaro Hernández (July 2024 – September 2024)
- (Colombia) Bernardo Redín (September 2024 – August 2025)
- (Colombia) Nelson Flórez (August 2025 – February 2026)
- (Venezuela) Richard Páez (February 2026 – August 2026)
- (Argentina) Nicolás Chiesa (August 2026 – Present)

== Legal issues ==
Ramiro Suárez Corzo as Mayor of Cúcuta was supposedly managing Cúcuta Deportivo, indirectly overriding the club's president Angel Uriel Garcia. According to El Tiempo newspaper Suárez was supposed to sell part of the team's stocks to the people of Cúcuta, 8.5% of the total 70%, but instead he sold that 70% to his friends. He also authorized Cúcuta to be exempt of taxes until the year 2010, when the Colombian law only allows 1 year to do so.
