= Adrián Muro =

Mexican footballer (born 1995)

Personal information
- Full name: Adrián Misael Muro Hernández
- Date of birth: 7 September 1995 (age 31)
- Place of birth: Aguascalientes City, Aguascalientes, Mexico
- Height: 1.85 m (6 ft 1 in)
- Position: Forward

Youth career
- 2012: Cruz Azul

Senior career*
Years	Team	Apps	(Gls)
2014	Topos de Reynosa	5	(0)
2014–2015	Sporting Canamy	10	(7)
2015–2017	Alebrijes de Oaxaca	4	(1)
2015–2016	→ Chapulineros de Oaxaca (loan)	4	(0)
2016–2017	→ Malinalco (loan)	26	(13)
2017	Sporting Canamy	9	(2)
2018–2019	La Piedad	15	(3)
2019–2020	Alacranes de Durango	20	(10)
2020–2021	CAFESSA Jalisco	16	(3)
2021	Escorpiones F.C.	12	(5)
2022	Luqa St. Andrew's F.C.	0	(0)
2022	C.D. Once Municipal	8	(0)
- * Club domestic league appearances and goals as of 23:41 UTC, 15 September 2021

Adrián Misael Muro Hernández (born September 7, 1995), known as Adrián Muro, is a Mexican professional footballer who plays for Escorpiones F.C.
