= Rubén Tanucci =

Argentine footballer

Personal information
- Full name: Rubén Alejandro Tanucci
- Date of birth: 23 March 1964 (age 62)
- Place of birth: Avellaneda, Argentina
- Height: 1.85 m (6 ft 1 in)
- Position: Centre-back

Senior career*
Years	Team	Apps	(Gls)
1985	Independiente		
1985	Círculo Deportivo	8	(0)
1985–1987	Temperley	31	(3)
1987–1988	Estudiantes LP	2	(0)
1988–1989	Huracán		
1989–1990	Racing de Córdoba	24	(1)
1990	Unión Española	25	(2)
1991	Deportes La Serena	26	(5)
1992	Coquimbo Unido	24	(2)
1993	Palestino	27	(1)
1994	Alianza Lima	4	(0)
1995	Palestino	20	(0)
1996–1998	Huachipato	47	(3)
1998	Unión Española		

Managerial career
- 1999–2002: Independiente (youth)
- 2003: Chiapas (youth)
- 2003: Jaguares de Tapachula
- 2005–2010: Independiente (youth)
- 2011: Temperley (youth)
- 2011: Temperley
- 2012–2014: Independiente (youth)
- 2014: Reynosa FC
- 2016–2017: Huracán (assistant)
- 2018: Cúcuta Deportivo (assistant)
- 2019: Deportivo Cali (assistant)
- 2020: Independiente (assistant)
- 2022: Atlético Tucumán (assistant)
- 2022–2023: Hermanos Colmenárez (assistant)
- 2023: Cúcuta Deportivo
- * Club domestic league appearances and goals

Rubén Alejandro Tanucci (born 23 March 1964) is an Argentine football manager and former player. A centre-back, he played for clubs of Argentina, Chile and Peru.

== Playing career ==
- (Argentina) C.D. Nicanor Otamendi 1985
- (Argentina) Temperley 1985–1987
- (Argentina) Estudiantes de La Plata 1987–1988
- (Argentina) Huracán 1988–1989
- (Argentina) Racing de Córdoba 1989–1990
- (Chile) Unión Española 1990
- (Chile) Deportes La Serena 1991
- (Chile) Coquimbo Unido 1992
- (Chile) Palestino 1993
- (Peru) Alianza Lima 1994
- (Chile) Palestino 1995
- (Chile) Huachipato 1996-1998
- (Chile) Unión Española 1998

== Coaching career ==
After he retired from playing, Tanucci became a football manager. He led Club Atlético Temperley during the second half of the 2010–11 Primera B Metropolitana season. Tanucci also managed Mexican third division side Atlético Reynosa in 2014. He is currently assistant manager to Lucas Pusineri at Colombian Categoría Primera A side Deportivo Cali.
