= Javier San Román =

Mexican footballer and manager (born 1987)

Personal information
- Full name: Javier San Román Celorio
- Date of birth: 27 January 1987 (age 39)
- Place of birth: Mexico City, Mexico
- Height: 1.81 m (5 ft 11 1/2 in)
- Position: Defender

Senior career*
Years	Team	Apps	(Gls)
2007–2008	Teca Huixquilucan	5	(0)
2008–2012	Tecamachalco	67	(9)

Managerial career
- 2021: Irapuato
- 2021: Alebrijes de Oaxaca Premier (Assistant)
- 2022: Municipal Grecia
- 2023: Municipal Grecia (Interim)
- 2024: Municipal Grecia
- * Club domestic league appearances and goals

Javier San Román Celorio (born January 27, 1987) is a Mexican football manager, executive and former player. He is the brother of the former football player and executive Santiago San Román.

== Footballer ==
His career as a professional footballer lasted five years between 2007 and 2012, playing for Teca Huixquilucan and Tecamachalco F.C., both in the Segunda División de México.

== Football executive ==
In 2012 he retired from professional soccer after his club was promoted to Ascenso MX, however, the team was remodeled to comply with the competition regulations, later, the club was relocated to Oaxaca City and renamed as Alebrijes de Oaxaca however, the club ownership continued under the Grupo Tecamachalco. At the end of 2012 San Román was appointed as the first president of the club. On April 16, 2016, San Román resigned as president of Alebrijes de Oaxaca.

In 2016, the Grupo Tecamachalco signed an agreement with the Grupo Orlegi to bring Tampico Madero F.C. to Ascenso MX, as part of the agreement Javier San Román was appointed as the president of this club. He remained in office until April 2018, when San Román resigned in protest for the lower numbers of clubs approved from get the promotion from Ascenso MX to Liga MX and a possible elimination of the promotion right.

After Tampico Madero, San Román returned to Oaxaca to be part of the club's board of directors, until 2019 when it was decided to put the franchise on hiatus with the aim of getting another place due to the loss of support of the fans and the low economic support from the government.

For the 2020–2021 season, Grupo Tecamachalco began a synergy with Club Deportivo Irapuato with the aim of ensuring the club's continuity in the city. As part of the agreement, San Román was appointed as the club's president. In December 2020 the club dismissed its manager Juan Manuel Rivera due to poor sporting results, due to lack of time to find another coach it was decided to appoint Javier San Román as the new manager of the club, so he resigned from the presidency of the same.

== Manager ==
San Román officially debuted as manager on January 16, 2021, in his first game, Irapuato drew two goals with Cruz Azul Hidalgo. In the eleven regular-phase matches that he directed, the club achieved seven victories, three draws and one defeat, for which he managed to qualify the team for promotion play-offs to Liga de Expansión MX. In the playoffs, San Román managed to eliminate C.F. La Piedad in the quarterfinals by an aggregate score of 5–2, in the semifinals he defeated Inter Playa del Carmen with an aggregate of 1–2, however, in this last game he was expelled and sanctioned for eight games due to unsportsmanlike conduct. Later, Irapuato defeated Cruz Azul Hidalgo in the final by an aggregate of 1–3, with which the club won the championship and category promotion, however, San Román had to witness the series from the stands.

== Honours ==
=== Manager ===
Irapuato

- Liga Premier de México: 2020–21

== Managerial statistics ==
As of 27 May 2021.

Managerial record by team and tenure
Team	From	To	Record					Ref
Team	From	To	P	W	D	L	Win %	Ref
Irapuato	26 December 2020	20 August 2021	15	9	5	1	60.0	
Total			15	9	5	1	60.0	—
