= Brian Martínez =

Mexican footballer (born 1996)

Personal information
- Full name: Brian Aarón Martínez Navarro
- Date of birth: 10 June 1996 (age 30)
- Place of birth: Ciudad Victoria, Tamaulipas, Mexico
- Height: 1.82 m (5 ft 11 1/2 in)
- Position: Forward

Youth career
- 2011–2014: Monterrey
- 2015–2017: Querétaro

Senior career*
Years	Team	Apps	(Gls)
2017	Querétaro	4	(0)
2018	→ Cimarrones de Sonora (loan)	5	(0)
2018	Real Zamora	10	(1)
2019	La Piedad	9	(2)
2019	Inter Playa del Carmen	27	(7)
2020–2021	Cruz Azul Hidalgo	21	(16)
2022	Municipal Grecia	13	(3)
2022–2023	Sporting San José	28	(9)
2023–2025	San Carlos	39	(14)
2025	Comunicaciones	8	(1)
- * Club domestic league appearances and goals as of 17:23, 14 September 2025 (UTC)

Brian Aarón Martínez Navarro (born 10 June 1996) is a Mexican professional footballer who plays as a forward.

== Club career ==
=== Youth ===
Martínez joined Monterrey Youth Academy in 2011. He continued through U-15, U-17, and U-20 at Monterrey. Until moving to Querétaro FC starting in Quetéros Youth Academy. Until finally reaching the first team, Jaime Lozano being the coach promoting Martínez to first team.

=== Querétaro ===
Martínez made his professional debut in the Liga MX on 5 August 2017, subbing in during the last 22 minutes of a 3–0 loss against Tigres UANL.
