= Raúl Suárez =

Mexican footballer (born 1995)

Personal information
- Full name: Raúl Antonio Suárez Góngora
- Date of birth: 25 September 1995 (age 31)
- Place of birth: Mérida, Yucatán, Mexico
- Height: 1.70 m (5 ft 7 in)
- Position: Midfielder

Youth career
- 2012–2014: Atlante

Senior career*
Years	Team	Apps	(Gls)
2014–2020	Atlante	8	(0)
2015	→ Venados (loan)	17	(1)
2016	→ Guadalajara Premier (loan)	10	(2)
2018	→ Pacific (loan)	16	(3)
2020–2021	Inter Playa del Carmen	25	(13)
2021	Venados	11	(2)
2022	Cancún	10	(1)
2023	Cancún	14	(0)
- * Club domestic league appearances and goals

Raúl Antonio Suárez Góngora (born 25 September 1995) is a Mexican professional footballer who plays as a midfielder for Cancún.

== Career ==
=== Atlante ===
Suárez came out of the Atlante F.C. youth system. He made his professional debut on 26 August 2014 in a Copa MX match against Toluca at 18 years old.

==== Loan at Venados ====
In December 2014, it was announced Suárez was sent out on loan to Mérida F.C., which was later renamed Venados. He made his Ascenso MX debut on 23 January 2015 against Irapuato. Suárez showed promising aspects with Venados.

==== Loan at Guadalajara ====
On 17 December 2015, Liga MX giants C.D. Guadalajara announced they had signed Suárez on a 1 year-loan with the option of purpose. That same day, they announced he would first participate with the Under-20s and the Reserve squad in order to win himself a shot at the first team squad. He only managed to get playing time with the reserve squad.

=== Return to Atlante ===
Suárez returned to Atlante after his loan ended and was registered with the first team.

== Personal life ==
His younger brother, Vladimir, is also a professional footballer who currently plays as a forward for Ascenso MX side Venados.
