= Azores de Hidalgo =

Mexican association football club

- Full name: Azores de Hidalgo Fútbol Club
- Nickname(s): Azores (Northern goshawks)
- Founded: April 2017; 7 years ago
- Dissolved: 23 January 2021; 4 years ago
- Ground: Estadio de la Asociación Deportiva Tula A.C. Tula de Allende, Hidalgo, Mexico
- Capacity: 1,500
- Owner: Pablo Gutiérrez
- Chairman: Marco Antonio Sosa
- Manager: Hugo Serrano
- League: Liga Premier de México
Home colours	Away colours

Azores de Hidalgo Fútbol Club was a Mexican professional football team based in Tula de Allende, Hidalgo, Mexico that played in Liga Premier de México.

== History ==
The team was founded in 2017, since that year it has participated in various competitions in the amateur sector of Mexican football.

In 2019, Real Zamora, a club that participated in the Liga Premier de México, decided to put its franchise on hiatus for a season to improve its sports facilities and thus be able to compete in better conditions. However, a year later the team had to look for a new location when the improvement of its stadium was not achieved.

In 2020, due to the problem with its facilities, the Real Zamora franchise was used so that Azores de Hidalgo could compete in the Liga Premier de México. On July 29, the club's participation in the league was confirmed, being placed in Group 2 along with other teams from the central and southern areas of Mexico. On August 7, Samuel Ponce de León was presented as the team's coach for the new stage.

On September 19, 2020, the club played its first official game. Azores de Hidalgo was defeated 2–1 against Deportivo Dongu. Carlos Calderón scored the first goal in the club's history.

On January 23, 2021, Azores de Hidalgo announced its withdrawal from the Liga Premier de México due to institutional problems, in addition, the Azores board of directors returned the license to Real Zamora owners, who agreed to start a new project with Inter de Querétaro F.C., a club that began to play in its place in the league, however, officially the team was called Azores de Hidalgo for the rest of the season.

== Stadium ==
The Estadio de la Asociación Deportiva Tula A.C. is a stadium located in Tula, Hidalgo, Mexico, the venue has a capacity to hold 1,500 spectators. Since November 2020 it became the club's field.

Originally, the team played in the Unidad Deportiva Ángel Losada, a sports complex located in Apan, Hidalgo, Mexico. It has a football stadium with a capacity for 2,500 spectators, which was opened in 2019.
