= Diego González (footballer, born July 1995) =

Mexican footballer

Personal information
- Full name: Diego Antonio González Morales
- Date of birth: 2 July 1995 (age 31)
- Place of birth: Jalostotitlán, Jalisco, Mexico
- Height: 1.74 m (5 ft 9 in)
- Position: Midfielder

Team information
- Current team: La Piedad
- Number: 7

Youth career
- 2013: Monarcas Morelia
- 2014: Limoneros de Apatzingán

Senior career*
Years	Team	Apps	(Gls)
2014–2016	Atlas II	11	(0)
2016	→ Cafetaleros de Tapachula (loan)	7	(0)
2017–2019	Durango	54	(5)
2017	→ Ocelotes UNACH (loan)	10	(2)
2020–	La Piedad	34	(9)
- * Club domestic league appearances and goals as of 21:50, 15 March 2021 (UTC)

Diego Antonio González Morales (born 2 July 1995) is a Mexican professional footballer who plays for La Piedad.
