= Atlético Bahía =

- Full name: Atlético Bahía Club de Fútbol
- Founded: 10 June 2019; 5 years ago
- Dissolved: 30 June 2020; 4 years ago
- Ground: Ciudad Deportiva Bahía de Banderas, San José del Valle, Nayarit
- Capacity: 4,000
- Owner: Juan Serna
- Chairman: Juan Serna
- League: Liga Premier - Serie A
- 2019–20 season: 13th, Group I (Tournament abandoned)
Home colours	Away colours	Third colours

The Atlético Bahía Club de Fútbol was a football team that played in the Liga Premier – Serie A, the club had its ground in San José del Valle, Bahía de Banderas, Nayarit, Mexico.

== History ==
On June 10, 2019 it was announced the reactivation of Deportivo Tepic J.A.P. a Liga Premier franchise that was put on hiatus at the end of 2017–18 season due to financial problems. The franchise was reactivated with a new name: Atlético Bahía and its new place is San José del Valle, Bahía de Banderas, Nayarit, México.

Before, the team franchise were renamed and replaced on three times: Atlético Veracruz, Cuervos de Ensenada and Deportivo Tepic J.A.P.

On June 30, 2020, the team announced that it stopped competing in professional soccer due to financing problems that arose from the economic crisis caused by COVID-19. Subsequently, the owner of the club began to organize a new soccer league called UPSL MX, thus eliminating any possibility of Atlético Bahía returning to compete.

=== Reserve teams ===
Atlético Bahía (Liga TDP)
Reserve team that played in the Liga TDP in the fifth level of the Mexican league system.
