= Inter de Querétaro F.C. =

Mexican association football club

Inter de Querétaro
- Full name: Inter de Querétaro Fútbol Club
- Nickname: Inter
- Founded: August 2020; 6 years ago
- Ground: Parque Bicentenario; Querétaro, Querétaro, Mexico
- Capacity: 1,000
- Owner: Apolonio Lozoya
- Chairman: Apolonio Lozoya
- Manager: Vacant
- League: Liga Premier – Serie A
- 2023–24: 17th – Group II
| Home colours | Away colours |

Inter de Querétaro Fútbol Club is a Mexican professional football club based in the city of Querétaro, Querétaro that plays in the Liga TDP.

== History ==
The team was founded in August 2020 with the name change of the Real Querétaro team that competed in the Tercera División de México and whose place was occupied by the new club. However, for administrative reasons the team officially played with the name of the previous club.

On January 23, 2021, Azores de Hidalgo announced its withdrawal from the Liga Premier de México due to institutional problems, in addition, the Azores board of directors returned the license to Real Zamora owners, who agreed to start a new project with Inter de Querétaro, so the Querétaro team used the place in the league. However, the team was officially moved to Tula de Allende, Hidalgo and was renamed Azores de Hidalgo for the rest of the season. Inter made their Liga Premier debut on January 30, 2021, losing 4–1 to Pioneros de Cancún.

At the end of January 2021, it was announced that the team got a second team in the Liga TDP after signing an agreement with the Club Fundadores, the new squad was called Inter Fundadores. On July 30, 2021, Inter de Querétaro obtained its own official registration in the Liga Premier and the Liga TDP.

In September 2021, the club got a third team in the Liga TDP, which became known as Inter Aicesa SJR, playing in San Juan del Río, Querétaro, In December 2021, the team was withdrawn from San Juan del Río due to problems between the board and the players, and the team was relocated to the city of Querétaro and renamed as Inter San Pablo. However, the team has always been officially called C.D. Querétaro 3D.

In 2024, the board decided to abandon its franchise in the Liga Premier, focusing solely on the Liga TDP teams.

== Stadium ==
Estadio del Parque Bicentenario is a multi-use stadium in the city of Querétaro, Querétaro. The stadium seats 1,000 and is used mostly for football matches.
