= Luis Cruz (Mexican footballer) =

Mexican footballer (born 1997)

Personal information
- Full name: Luis Fernando Cruz Ontiveros
- Date of birth: January 16, 1997 (age 29)
- Place of birth: Monterrey, Nuevo León, Mexico
- Height: 1.79 m (5 ft 10 1/2 in)
- Position: Forward

Team information
- Current team: Racing Porto Palmeiras
- Number: 7

Youth career
- 2011–2018: UANL

Senior career*
| Years | Team | Apps | (Gls) |
| 2016–2017 | → Zacatepec (loan) | 11 | (2) |
| 2019 | Tuxtla | 12 | (4) |
| 2019 | Yalmakán | 6 | (1) |
| 2020–2021 | Colima | 20 | (11) |
| 2021 | Venados | 14 | (1) |
| 2022 | Saltillo | 6 | (1) |
| 2022 | Durango | 3 | (0) |
| 2023 | La Piedad | 10 | (4) |
| 2023– | Racing Porto Palmeiras | 0 | (0) |
- * Club domestic league appearances and goals as of 23 August 2023

Luis Fernando Cruz Ontiveros (Note: In this Spanish name, the first or paternal surname is Cruz and the second or maternal family name is Ontiveros.) (born 16 January 1997) is a Mexican professional footballer.
