= Estadio Olímpico de Oaxtepec =

Multi-use stadium in Oaxtepec, Morelos, Mexico

- Interactive map of Estadio Olímpico de Oaxtepec
- Location: Oaxtepec, Morelos, Mexico
- Coordinates: 18.9071°N 98.9703°W
- Owner: IMSS Oaxtepec
- Capacity: 9,000

Construction
- Groundbreaking: 1978
- Opened: 1979
- Architect: Alejandro Prieto

Tenants
- Oaxtepec (1979–1984; 2022–2023); Sporting Canamy (2017–2020, 2021–2026); Cuautla (First Half of Clausura 2018); Real Canamy Tlayacapan (2019–2020)

The Estadio Olímpico de Oaxtepec is a multi-use stadium in Oaxtepec, Morelos, Mexico. It is currently used mostly for football matches. The stadium has a capacity of 9,000 people.

== Stadium Renovation ==
In late July 2017, the stadium began renovating the stadium for improvement for fans. The renovation was completed on October 9.
