= Armando González (footballer, born 1997) =

Mexican footballer (born 1997)

Personal information
- Full name: Armando González Sandoval
- Date of birth: 13 June 1997 (age 29)
- Place of birth: Tepic, Nayarit, Mexico
- Height: 1.79 m (5 ft 10 in)
- Position: Winger

Youth career
- 2013–2015: Coras
- 2017: Guadalajara

Senior career*
Years	Team	Apps	(Gls)
2015–2016	Coras	23	(2)
2017–2020	Atlético Zacatepec	56	(6)
2020	Atlético Morelia	9	(0)
2021	Irapuato	11	(4)
2021	Zacatecas	16	(4)
2022–2024	Oaxaca	51	(16)
2025	Guanacasteca	1	(0)
- * Club domestic league appearances and goals as of 20 October 2022

Armando González Sandoval (born 13 July 1997) is a Mexican professional footballer who plays as a winger.

== Career ==
González made his professional debut at the age of 16.
