= Isaac Moreno =

Mexican footballer and manager (born 1982)

Personal information
- Full name: Isaac Moreno Alcántara
- Date of birth: 25 July 1982 (age 44)
- Place of birth: Mexico City, Mexico
- Height: 1.76 m (5 ft 9 1/2 in)
- Position: Midfielder

Team information
- Current team: Monterrey U-19 (Manager)

Senior career*
Years	Team	Apps	(Gls)
2003–2004	Atlético Mexiquense	22	(3)
2004–2005	Celaya	30	(2)
2005	Delfines de Coatzacoalcos	1	(0)

Managerial career
- 2010–2011: Grupo Sherwood (Assistant)
- 2012: Grupo Sherwood
- 2013–2014: Manchester Metepec
- 2014–2016: Inter Playa del Carmen (Assistant)
- 2017: Atlas Reserves and Academy
- 2018: Atlas Premier
- 2018–2020: Correcaminos UAT Premier
- 2020: Atlético San Luis (Liga TDP)
- 2021: Tecos
- 2021–2022: Mazatlán Reserves and Academy
- 2022: Monterrey Reserves and Academy
- 2023–2024: Puebla (Assistant)
- 2024–: Monterrey Reserves and Academy
- * Club domestic league appearances and goals

Isaac Moreno Alcántara (born July 25, 1982) is a Mexican football manager and former player. He was born in Mexico City.
