= Cafetaleros de Chiapas Premier =

- Full name: Club de Fútbol Cafetaleros de Chiapas Premier
- Nickname(s): Los Cafetaleros (The Coffee Growers)
- Founded: May 30, 2019; 6 years ago
- Dissolved: June 26, 2020; 5 years ago
- Ground: Estadio Olímpico de Tapachula; Tapachula, Chiapas, Mexico
- Capacity: 18,017
- Owner: Gabriel Orantes Costanzo; José Luis Orantes Costanzo
- Chairman: José Luis Orantes Costanzo
- League: Liga Premier - Serie A
- 2019–20 season: 10th – Group II (Tournament abandoned)
Home colours	Away colours

The Club Cafetaleros de Chiapas Premier was a team that played in the Liga Premier in Tapachula, Chiapas, Mexico and was the official reserve team for Cafetaleros de Chiapas.

== History ==
In May 2019, Cafetaleros moved from Tapachula to Tuxtla Gutiérrez, the team left its original city for sports and urban infrastructure issues in order to aspire to the promotion to Liga MX. On May 30 the team was presented to the public, it was announced the creation of a team for the Liga Premier de México based in Tapachula.

The team was created from Ocelotes UNACH, a club that played in the Liga Premier – Serie B, the board sought to continue with a squad based in Tapachula that can return to Ascenso MX later.

On June 26, 2020, the main team of Cafetaleros de Chiapas was relocated to Cancun and renamed as Cancún F.C., following this move, the Liga Premier team became the club's primary team, so it was relocated from Tapachula to Tuxtla Gutiérrez. This was considered as the disappearance of this team, to continue with the history of the main squad.
