= Real Canamy Tlayacapan =

- Full name: Real Canamy Tlayacapan
- Nickname(s): Los Guerreros (The Warriors)
- Founded: 23 May 2019; 6 years ago
- Dissolved: 2020; 5 years ago
- Ground: Estadio Olímpico de Oaxtepec; Oaxtepec, Morelos, Mexico
- Capacity: 9,000
- Owner: Gustavo Navarro Zúñiga
- Chairman: Gustavo Navarro Zúñiga
- League: Liga Premier - Serie B
- 2019-20: 9th (Tournament abandoned)
Home colours	Away colours

Real Canamy Tlayacapan was a Mexican football club that played in the Liga Premier, was the official reserve team of Sporting Canamy.

== History ==
In 2016, Sporting Canamy acquired an expansion place in the Liga Premier de Ascenso, so the franchise participating in the Liga de Nuevos Talentos was put on hiatus.

On May 23, 2019, Gustavo Navarro Zuñiga, Sporting Canamy's chairman, announced the creation of a new team called Real Canamy Tlayacapan, that plays in the Serie B. The team was created to retake the franchise that was on hiatus since 2016.

The team was named Real Canamy Tlayacapan in honor of the fans coming from that town in the state of Morelos, however, the team shared the Estadio Olímpico de Oaxtepec with the club's main team. In 2020 Real Canamy was dissolved due to financial problems caused by the COVID-19 pandemic, also the main team, Sporting Canamy, was put on hiatus during the 2020–21 season for the same reason.

== See also ==
- Sporting Canamy
- Football in Mexico
