= Luis Franco (Mexican footballer) =

Mexican footballer (born 1993)

Personal information
- Full name: Luis Miguel Franco Zamora
- Date of birth: 15 May 1993 (age 33)
- Place of birth: Zamora, Michoacán, Mexico
- Height: 1.66 m (5 ft 5 in)
- Position: Midfielder

Team information
- Current team: Victoria

Youth career
- 2008–2010: Real Zamora

Senior career*
| Years | Team | Apps | (Gls) |
| 2010–2011 | Atlético Zamora | 22 | (5) |
| 2011–2013 | Real Zamora | 99 | (66) |
| 2012 | → Ballenas Galeana Morelos (loan) | 1 | (0) |
| 2013–2018 | León | 5 | (1) |
| 2017 | → Real Zamora (loan) | 16 | (2) |
| 2018–2020 | Yalmakán | 35 | (14) |
| 2020–2021 | La Piedad | 23 | (15) |
| 2021–2022 | Herediano | 54 | (6) |
| 2023–2024 | Puntarenas | 37 | (7) |
| 2025– | Victoria | 0 | (0) |
- * Club domestic league appearances and goals as of 8 December 2022

Luis Miguel Franco Zamora (born 15 May 1993) is a Mexican professional footballer who plays as a midfielder for Liga FPD club Herediano.

== Career Path ==
Luis Miguel Franco began his career in 2008, joining Real Cavadas of the Mexican Third Division. After his time with Real Cavadas, he moved to Real Zamora, also of the Mexican Third Division, in 2011.

In 2013, Luis Franco joined the youth academy of Club León. His official debut in Liga MX came against Toluca, as Gustavo Matosas had rotated the squad due to the Copa Libertadores. The match ended in a 2–1 victory for Toluca. Matosas called him up again against Tigres UANL, where Luis Miguel Franco scored a great goal off a pass from Rafael Márquez to give Club León a 1–0 lead. León ultimately won that match 3–0.

For the 2014 Apertura Tournament, he was registered with the first team, but he did not play any matches.

== Honours ==
Herediano

- Liga FPD: Apertura 2021
