= Atlético San Luis Premier =

- Full name: Club Atlético de San Luis Premier
- Nicknames: Rojiblancos (The Red and white)
- Founded: 30 May 2019; 7 years ago
- Dissolved: 29 June 2021; 5 years ago
- Ground: Estadio Alfonso Lastras, San Luis Potosí City, San Luis Potosí, Mexico
- Capacity: 25,709
- Owner: Atlético de Madrid del Potosí S.A. de C.V.
- Chairman: Alberto Marrero
- League: Liga Premier - Serie A
- 2020–21: 6th – Group I
Home colours	Away colours

The Club Atlético de San Luis Premier was a team that played in the Liga Premier in San Luis Potosí City, Mexico and was the official reserve team for Atlético San Luis.

== History ==
In May 2019, Atlético San Luis achieved its promotion to Liga MX. The regulation of this competition forces the participants to have youth teams in different categories, however, in Liga Premier this requirement no longer exists, despite this, the Atlético board decided to create a team in this league to continue with their footballers development policy.

On May 30, 2019, the creation of Atlético San Luis Premier was officially announced and Ramón Villa was appointed as its manager.

On June 29, 2021, the team had dissolved due to a financial restructuring of the club.
