= José Calderón (Mexican footballer) =

Mexican footballer (born 1993)

Personal information
- Full name: José Luis Calderón Morales
- Date of birth: 10 July 1993 (age 33)
- Place of birth: La Antigua, Veracruz, Mexico
- Height: 1.81 m (5 ft 11 in)
- Position: Defender

Team information
- Current team: Oaxaca
- Number: 3

Youth career
- 2008–2010: Pioneros de Cancún

Senior career*
Years	Team	Apps	(Gls)
2010–2014	Atlante	1	(0)
2014	→ Pioneros de Cancún (loan)	9	(0)
2015	→ Atlético Chiapas (loan)	12	(0)
2015	Querétaro	0	(0)
2016–2017	Pioneros de Cancún	15	(0)
2017	Irapuato	0	(0)
2018	Tepatitlán de Morelos	10	(1)
2018	Cimarrones de Sonora Premier	4	(0)
2019–2021	Inter Playa del Carmen	39	(2)
2021	Guanacasteca	1	(0)
2022	Municipal Grecia	8	(0)
2022–2023	Once Deportivo de Ahuachapan	23	(0)
2024–	Oaxaca	0	(0)
- * Club domestic league appearances and goals as of 10 April 2022

José Luis Calderón Morales (born 10 July 1993) is a Mexican professional footballer who plays as a defender for Primera División club Once Deportivo.
