= La Paz F.C. (Mexico) =

Mexican football club

- Full name: La Paz Fútbol Club
- Nickname: Lobos Marinos (The Sea Lions)
- Founded: 23 February 2019; 7 years ago
- Dissolved: 6 August 2020; 5 years ago
- Ground: Estadio Guaycura, La Paz, Baja California Sur, Mexico
- Capacity: 5,209
- Owner: Depsa
- League: Liga Premier - Serie A
- 2019-20: 4th (at Serie B) (Tournament abandoned)
- Website: https://www.lapazfc.com/
Home colours	Away colours

The La Paz Fútbol Club, commonly known as Lobos Marinos de La Paz, was a Mexican football club based in La Paz. The club was founded in 2019, and played in the Serie B of Liga Premier.

== History ==
The team was founded on February 23, 2019 during the celebration of the re-inauguration of the Estadio Guaycura. In June 2019 the participation of the team in the Liga Premier Serie B was confirmed.

It was the first professional football team in the city, in addition to the return of this sport to the state since the disappearance of the Delfines de Los Cabos F.C., Baja California Sur has been the Mexican state with the least presence of professional soccer teams, previously, some Liga MX clubs had tried to set reserve teams in the state, but had withdrawn their offer.

On July 24, 2019, the team played their first game against Salamanca CF of the spaniard Segunda División B. The game ended with a tie at zero goals. They played their first competitive league game a few weeks later, defeating Nuevo Chimalhuacán 3–2 at Estadio Guaycura on August 17. The first goal in club history was scored by César Cruz López.

On August 6, 2020, the team announced that it would not take part of the 2020-21 season due to financial problems derived from COVID-19, after it was known that most of that season would be played without the attendance of spectators to the games. In 2021 the team did not return from the one-year hiatus period that it had requested, so it was considered as the dissolution of the club.
