= Sporting Canamy =

- Full name: Club Sporting Canamy
- Nickname: Los Guerreros (The Warriors)
- Founded: 23 October 2003; 22 years ago
- Ground: Estadio Olímpico de Oaxtepec; Oaxtepec, Morelos, Mexico
- Capacity: 9,000
- Owner: Gustavo Navarro Zúñiga
- Chairman: Gustavo Navarro Zúñiga
- Manager: Juan Carlos Rico
- League: Liga Premier (Serie A)
- 2025–26: Regular phase: 12th (Group II); Final phase: Did not qualify
Home colours	Away colours

Club Sporting Canamy is a Mexican football club that plays in the Segunda División de México after their objective to promote from the Tercera División de México was a success in the 2014–15 season and finished as a runner-up. The club is based in Oaxtepec, Morelos after a relocation from Mexico City after the 2016–17 season.

== History ==
On May 30, 2015, Sporting Canamy will be promoted to Segunda División de México for the first time in their history to Liga Premier (Winner) or Liga Nuevo Talentos (Runner-up) and also, advance to their first final app. in history, too. But a week later, they promoted to Liga Nuevo Talentos (Runner-up) after losing to Uruapan. However, both teams participated in the Liga Nuevo Talentos after Uruapan were promoted to Liga Premier, but stadium requirements were not clear and they have a year to fix the solution.

On April 23, 2016, after a winning series against Sahuayo F.C. in the semifinals of Liga Nuevo Talentos Clausura 2016 plus winning the quarterfinals against San Luis B, Sporting Canamy advanced to their first final in their rookie season in the Liga Nuevo Talentos after less than a year when they were promoted from the Tercera Division. Sporting Canamy was defeated in the final against Real Zamora.

However, in July 2016, the club was invited to participate at Liga Premier de Ascenso as an expansion team. In May 2017, Sporting Canamy moved from Mexico City to Oaxtepec.

After their arrival in Serie A, Sporting Canamy maintained a reserve team in the Third Division, this squad had won the championship of the category in the 2016–17 season, however, it was later stripped of the title after a complaint filed by Tecos F.C., which argued the use of players older than the age allowed by the regulation.

In August 2020 the team went into hiatus due to financial problems derived from COVID-19, however, a month later an agreement was signed with Halcones Zúñiga, a team of the Liga TDP, to participate in that league during the 2020–21 season, using the Halcones license, but with the Canamy operation and colors. In 2021 the team was reactivated in Liga Premier and participates in the league since the 2021–22 season.

== Players ==
=== Current squad ===
As of January 12, 2026

Note: Flags indicate national team as defined under FIFA eligibility rules; some limited exceptions apply. Players may hold more than one non-FIFA nationality.

No.	Pos.	Nation	Player
2	DF	MEX	Felipe García
4	DF	MEX	Braulio Ramírez
5	DF	MEX	Ricardo Vidal
6	DF	MEX	Mauro Sampayo
7	MF	MEX	Isaác Aguilar
8	MF	MEX	Iratzy Domínguez
9	MF	MEX	Morrison Palma
10	MF	COL	Dairo Berrio
11	MF	MEX	Ricardo Meza
12	GK	MEX	Joshua Nava
13	FW	MEX	Nicolás Aguilar
14	DF	MEX	Emiliano Hernández
15	DF	MEX	Antonio Arreola

No.	Pos.	Nation	Player
16	MF	MEX	Víctor Sánchez
17	MF	MEX	Alejandro Ramírez
18	MF	USA	Kevin González
19	MF	MEX	Lizandro Sánchez
20	DF	MEX	Eduardo Olmos
21	MF	MEX	Kevin Rincón
22	GK	MEX	Sebastián Díaz
23	DF	MEX	Érik Torres
24	DF	MEX	Gael Tinajero
28	DF	MEX	Francisco Montes de Oca
29	FW	MEX	Emmanuel Rodríguez
30	FW	MEX	Edwin Mendoza
31	MF	MEX	Arturo Vera

=== Reserve teams ===
Sporting Canamy (Liga TDP)
Reserve team that plays in the Liga TDP, the fourth level of the Mexican league system

== Competitive record ==
Torneo	Tier	Position	Matches	Wins	Draws	Losses	GF (Note: Goals for / scored)	GA (Note: Goals against / conceded)
Apertura 2015	Liga Nuevo Talentos	Quarters	12	5	6	1	16	11
Clausura 2016	Liga Nuevo Talentos	Runner-up	12	6	4	2	22	10
Apertura 2016	Serie A	11th/Group 3	15	5	1	9	21	29
Clausura 2017	Serie A	16th/Group 3	15	2	3	10	10	24
Apertura 2017	Serie A	17th/Group 2	17	3	3	11	21	37
Clausura 2018	Serie A	12th/Group 2	17	5	5	7	20	29
2018-19	Serie A	15th/Group 2	30	7	7	16	31	57
2019-20*	Serie A	12th/Group 2	20	2	6	12	15	32
Totals	1 Quarters & 1 Runner-up	2/9	138	35	35	68	156	230

- 2019-20 season was suspended on March 16, 2020; ended the season completely on May 22 due to COVID-19.

== See also ==
- Football in Mexico
- Real Canamy Tlayacapan

== Club honors ==
- Liga Premier de México: 0

Runner-up (1): Clausura 2016

- Tercera División de México: 0

Runner-up (1): 2015–16
