= Atlético Reynosa =

- Full name: Atlético Reynosa Fútbol Club
- Nickname: Los Rojos (The Reds)
- Founded: 1 January 2012; 13 years ago (as Reynosa F.C.)
- Dissolved: June 2020; 5 years ago
- Ground: Unidad Deportiva Solidaridad; Reynosa, Tamaulipas, Mexico
- Capacity: 20,000
Home colours	Away colours

Atlético Reynosa Fútbol Club was a Mexican football club based in Reynosa, Tamaulipas founded in 2012 as Reynosa Fútbol Club, and was later rebranded in 2017 as Atlético Reynosa. The team played in the Liga Premier – Serie A of the Segunda División de México between 2012 and 2020. From 2020, the team went into hiatus due to economic and financial difficulties and stopped participating in Mexican football indefinitely, but without being dissolved. In 2022, the team's license was moved to Tampico, Tamaulipas and sold to C.D.S. Tampico Madero, so any possibility of the return of Atlético Reynosa was eliminated.

== History ==
The team was established in 2012 with the name Reynosa F.C., at first, the franchise was planned to play in the Liga de Ascenso de México, however, it was finally placed in the Liga Premier de Ascenso (third level) because it did not find a place in the second category, the first match of the club was a friendly played on August 14, 2012 against Dorados de Sinaloa. Their first seasons were played at the Estadio Adolfo López Mateos, and later the team started to build a new stadium.

On September 27, 2013, the team's new stadium was inaugurated, located in the Unidad Deportiva Solidaridad.

On June 19, 2017, Reynosa F.C. was acquired by new owners who changed their name to Atlético Reynosa, and the colors of the club were changed, from red, green and white to blue and white.

In 2020, the team began the process to join the new Liga de Expansión MX, which became the second league in Mexican football system. However, finally the participation of Atlético Reynosa in the league was rejected due to several economic problems with its stadium and that is why the club had to remain in the Segunda División de México, after this the team went on hiatus due to financial difficulties caused by the loss of sponsors that would support the club as long as it got a place in the Liga de Expansión.

Between 2012 and 2015, the club had a team affiliated in Liga de Nuevos Talentos called Topos de Reynosa, which was moved and sold to Chetumal, Quintana Roo to become Tigrillos de Chetumal.

== Season to season ==
Season	Division	Place
Apertura 2012	3. Segunda División de México	8th Group I (round of 16)
Clausura 2013	3. Segunda División de México	7th Group I (round of 16)
Apertura 2013	3. Segunda División de México	13th Group I
Clausura 2014	3. Segunda División de México	16th Group I
Apertura 2014	3. Segunda División de México	7th Group I
Clausura 2015	3. Segunda División de México	1st Group I (semifinals)
Apertura 2015	3. Segunda División de México	5th Group I
Clausura 2016	3. Segunda División de México	2nd Group I (semifinals)
Apertura 2016	3. Segunda División de México	5th Group I (quarterfinals)
Clausura 2017	3. Segunda División de México	9th Group I
Apertura 2017	3. Liga Premier Serie A	13th Group I
Clausura 2018	3. Liga Premier Serie A	6th Group I (semifinals)

== Players ==
=== Current squad ===
As of January 31, 2020.

== Player records ==
=== All-time top scorers ===
Ranking	Nationality	Name	Years	Goals
1	(Mexico)	Pablo Hütt García	2012	11
2	(Mexico)	Hilario Tristán Martínez	2012-2013	9
3	(Mexico)	Francisco Portela Renteral	2012–	8
4	(Mexico)	Óscar Eduardo Uscanga Gutiérrez	2013	5
5	(Mexico)	Hugo Alfonso Espude Marín	2012	4
6	(Mexico)	Gustavo Daniel Rodríguez González	2013-	4
7	(Mexico)	Julio Adrián Reyes Hernández	2013	3
8	(Mexico)	Jaime Ayala Jain	2012	2
9	(Mexico)	Eduardo Becerra Hernández	2012	2
10	(Mexico)	Fernando Cabello Larreta	2013-	2

== Managers ==
- (Mexico) Franco Zúñiga Gómez (Apr 2012 – Aug 2012)
- (Mexico) Mario Pérez Guadarrama (Aug 2012 – Nov 2012)
- (Mexico) Franco Zúñiga Gómez (Nov 2012 – Nov 2013)
- (Paraguay) Cristóbal Cubilla Delgadillo (Nov 2013 – Mar 2014)
- (Argentina) Rubén Alejandro Tanucci (Mar 2014 – Apr 2014)
- (Mexico) Carlos Reinoso, Jr. (Apr 2014 – Sep 2014)
- (Mexico) Ramón Villa Zevallos (Sep 2014 – Jul 2017)
- (Mexico) Esteban Mejía (Jul 2017 – Jul 2018)
- (Mexico) Alejandro Pérez Macías (Jul 2018 – Jun 2019)
- (Mexico) Gastón Obledo (Jul 2019 – Jun 2020)
