= 2021–22 Serie A de México season =

Serie A de México
- Season: 2021–22
- Champions: Apertura: Durango (3rd title); Clausura: Mazorqueros (1st title)
- Matches: 338
- Goals: 981 (2.9 per match)
- Top goalscorer: Apertura: Klinsman Calderón (13 goals); Clausura: Diego Gama (15 goals)
- Biggest home win: Apertura: Yalmakán 10–0 Leviatán (21 November 2021); Clausura: Cafetaleros de Chiapas 8–0 Cañoneros (2 April 2022)
- Biggest away win: Apertura: Leviatán 0–7 Cafetaleros de Chiapas (16 October 2021); Clausura: Leviatán 1–5 Escorpiones (12 February 2022); Dongu 0–4 La Piedad (19 February 2022); Saltillo 1–5 Mazorqueros (5 March 2022)
- Highest scoring: Apertura: Yalmakán 10–0 Leviatán (21 November 2021); Clausura: Mineros de Fresnillo 5–3 Coras (4 March 2022); Escorpiones 5–3 Dongu (19 March 2022); Cafetaleros de Chiapas 8–0 Cañoneros (2 April 2022)
- Longest winning run: Apertura:6 matches Cafetaleros de Chiapas; Clausura:7 matches Tritones Vallarta
- Longest unbeaten run: Apertura:8 matches Cafetaleros de Chiapas; Clausura:13 matches Mazorqueros
- Longest winless run: Apertura:11 matches Mineros de Fresnillo; Clausura:13 matches Catedráticos Elite
- Longest losing run: Apertura:5 matches Mineros de Fresnillo; Clausura:10 matches Dongu
- Highest attendance: Apertura: 3,000; Cafetaleros de Chiapas vs Inter Playa del Carmen (25 September 2021); Clausura: 4,000; Cafetaleros de Chiapas vs Cañoneros (2 April 2022)
- Lowest attendance: Apertura: 40; Catedráticos Elite vs UAT (30 October 2021); Clausura: 20; Catedráticos Elite vs Colima (2 April 2022)
- Total attendance: Apertura: 61,809; Clausura: 48,572
- Average attendance: Apertura: 418; Clausura: 322
- Stats are from the regular season only

The 2021–22 Serie A de México season is part of the third-tier football league of Mexico. The tournament began on 17 September 2021 and finished on 15 May 2022.

== Offseason Changes ==
- 27 teams will participate in the season.
- Since 2021–22 season, the season will once again be divided into two tournaments: Apertura and Clausura.
- On June 18, 2021, but was confirmed by the team a week later, Cruz Azul Hidalgo has been put on hiatus due to financial and economic issues within the club.
- After taking a hiatus due to COVID-19, Sporting Canamy, UAT and Yalmakán returns to participate in Serie A for 2021–22 season.
- On June 23, 2021, Aguacateros CDU returns to Serie B after an invite to participate in Serie A for the 2020–21 season when Serie B was suspended.
- On June 26, 2021, Fuertes de Fortín was promoted from Liga TDP, however, due to problems with its field, the team was sold to businessmen from Orizaba, who relocated it to their city and was renamed Montañeses F.C.
- On June 26, 2021 Club RC–1128 was promoted from Liga TDP, however, due to problems with its field, the team was merged with Catedráticos Elite F.C. and took the identity of this club, so it was relocated in Ameca.
- On June 29, 2021, Atlético San Luis dissolved due to a financial restructuring of the club.
- On June 30, 2021, Mineros de Fresnillo has been put on hiatus due to sponsorship funding issues. However, later Mineros de Zacatecas became part of the owners of the club, so the continuity of the team for the 2021–22 season was assured.
- On May 16, 2021, C.D. Irapuato sportively won the promotion to the Liga de Expansión MX. However, on June 3, 2021, the Mexican Football Federation announced the opening of a selection process to choose the club that would occupy the Liga Premier 3 place, because Irapuato must still meet some requirements to compete in the Liga de Expansión MX, three Liga Premier clubs (Durango, Irapuato and Matamoros), were chosen for an audit process that would determine the winner of the promotion. On July 5, 2021, it was confirmed that no team undergoing the certification audit approved the procedure, so there will be no club promoted from the Liga Premier.
- On July 15, 2021, CAFESSA Jalisco has been placed on hiatus, will not participate this season.
- On July 15, 2021, Coras de Nayarit F.C. announced it return to the League after a one-year hiatus, however, the team was renamed Coras F.C.
- On July 29, 2021, Zitácuaro has been placed on one–year hiatus due to financial issues, will not participate this season.
- On July 30, 2021, Pioneros de Cancún has been placed on hiatus.
- On July 30, 2021, Escorpiones, Leviatán, Lobos ULMX, Tritones Vallarta and Zap joined the league as expansion teams.
- On July 30, 2021, Chalco and Cuautla returned to Serie B.
- On July 30, 2021 Inter de Querétaro F.C. obtained its own official register in the league, as during the second half of the previous season the team entered the category but officially played as Azores de Hidalgo F.C.
- Before the start of the season Cañoneros Marina was renamed Cañoneros F.C.
- On September 10, 2021, Irapuato was put on hiatus due to the lack of agreement between the owners of the club and the Irapuato city council, this after the expiration of the rights to use the Stadium by the team management.

== Teams information ==
=== Group 1 ===
Location of teams in the 2021–22 Serie A Group 1

Club	Manager	City	Stadium	Capacity	Affiliate
Alacranes de Durango	(Mexico) Héctor Jair Real	Durango City, Durango	Francisco Zarco	18,000	—
Catedráticos Elite	(Mexico) Jorge Humberto Torres	Ameca, Jalisco	Núcleo Deportivo y de Espectáculos Ameca	7,000	—
Cimarrones de Sonora	(Mexico) José Islas	Hermosillo, Sonora	Héroe de Nacozari	18,747	Cimarrones de Sonora
Colima	(Mexico) José Ernesto Santana (Interim)	Colima City, Colima	Olímpico Universitario de Colima	11,812	—
Coras	(Mexico) Manuel Naya Barba	Tepic, Nayarit	Olímpico Santa Teresita	4,000	–
Gavilanes de Matamoros	(Mexico) Lucas Ayala	Matamoros, Tamaulipas	El Hogar	22,000	—
Leones Negros UdeG	(Mexico) Ahuizotl Sánchez	Zapopan, Jalisco	Instalaciones Club Deportivo U.de G. Cancha 3	3,000	Leones Negros UdeG
Mazorqueros	(Mexico) Jaime Durán	Ciudad Guzmán, Jalisco	Municipal Santa Rosa	4,000	—
Mineros de Fresnillo	(Mexico) Joaquín Moreno	Fresnillo, Zacatecas	Unidad Deportiva Minera Fresnillo	6,000	Mineros de Zacatecas
Saltillo	(Mexico) Jair García	Saltillo, Coahuila	Olímpico Francisco I. Madero	7,000	—
Tecos	(Mexico) Héctor Medrano	Zapopan, Jalisco	Tres de Marzo	18,779	—
Tritones Vallarta	(Mexico) Ulises Sánchez	Puerto Vallarta, Jalisco	Ciudad del Deporte San José del Valle	4,000	—
Tuzos UAZ	(Mexico) Rubén Hernández	Zacatecas City, Zacatecas	Carlos Vega Villalba	20,068	—
UAT	(Mexico) Jorge Dimas	Ciudad Victoria, Tamaulipas	Marte R. Gómez	10,520	Correcaminos UAT

=== Group 2 ===
Location of teams in the 2021–22 Serie A Group 2

Club	Manager	City	Stadium	Capacity	Affiliate
Cafetaleros de Chiapas	(Mexico) Miguel Ángel Casanova	Tuxtla Gutiérrez, Chiapas	Víctor Manuel Reyna	29,001	Cancún
Cañoneros	(Mexico) Carlos Alberto Valdéz	Milpa Alta, Mexico City	Momoxco	3,500	—
Dongu	(Mexico) José Ramón Gómez	Cuautitlán, State of Mexico	Los Pinos	5,000	—
Escorpiones	(Chile) Héctor Mancilla	Cuernavaca, Morelos	Centenario	14,800	—
Inter Playa del Carmen	(Mexico) Carlos Bracamontes	Playa del Carmen, Quintana Roo	Unidad Deportiva Mario Villanueva Madrid	7,500	—
Inter Querétaro	(Mexico) José Antonio Soria	Querétaro City, Querétaro	Olímpico de Querétaro (Note: Although the club registered the Estadio Olímpico de Querétaro as its official field, the team played its matches at the Unidad Deportiva La Cañada in Apertura 2021.)	4,600	—
La Piedad	(Mexico) Enrique Pérez	La Piedad, Michoacán	Juan N. López	13,356	—
Leviatán	(Mexico) José Alberto Pérez	Mexico City	Jesús Martínez Palillo (Note: Although the club registered the Estadio Jesús Martínez "Palillo" as its official field, they played some matches at the Neza 86 stadium in Apertura 2021)	6,000	–
Lobos ULMX	(Mexico) Rowan Vargas	Celaya, Guanajuato	Miguel Alemán Valdés	23,182	Celaya
Montañeses	(Mexico) Víctor Hernández	Orizaba, Veracruz	Socum (Note: Although the club registered the Estadio Socum as its official field, the team plays its matches at the Complejo Deportivo Orizaba Sur.)	7,000	–
Sporting Canamy	(Mexico) David Zaragoza (Interim)	Oaxtepec, Morelos	Olímpico de Oaxtepec	9,000	–
Yalmakán	(Mexico) Juan Carlos Montiel	Chetumal, Quintana Roo	José López Portillo	6,600	—
Zap	(Mexico) Jorge Hernández	Zapotlanejo, Jalisco	Miguel Hidalgo	1,700	–

== Torneo Apertura ==
=== Group 1 ===
==== Standings ====
Pos	Team	Pld	W	D	L	GF	GA	GD	Pts	Qualification or relegation
1	Mazorqueros	13	11	1	1	30	8	+22	38	Liguilla de Ascenso
2	Alacranes de Durango (C)	13	9	3	1	24	10	+14	31	Liguilla de Ascenso
3	Saltillo	13	9	3	1	25	12	+13	31	Liguilla de Ascenso
4	Coras	13	6	2	5	20	15	+5	24	Liguilla de Ascenso
5	Gavilanes de Matamoros	13	7	2	4	20	15	+5	24	2021–22 Copa Conecta
6	Tecos	13	6	3	4	18	14	+4	22	2021–22 Copa Conecta
7	Tritones Vallarta	13	5	2	6	21	26	−5	18	2021–22 Copa Conecta
8	Colima	13	5	2	6	18	18	0	17	2021–22 Copa Conecta
9	Leones Negros UdeG	13	3	4	6	18	21	−3	15	
10	Cimarrones de Sonora	13	4	2	7	20	20	0	14	
11	UAT	13	3	3	7	13	18	−5	12	
12	UAZ	13	3	2	8	19	26	−7	12	
13	Catedráticos Elite	13	3	2	8	13	27	−14	11	
14	Mineros de Fresnillo	13	1	1	11	6	35	−29	4	

Updated to match(es) played on 27 November 2021. Source: Liga Premier FMF
(C) Champions

==== Positions by Round ====
Qualification to quarter-finals
Last place in table

Team ╲ Round	1	2	3	4	5	6	7	8	9	10	11	12	13
Mazorqueros	1	1	1	1	1	1	1	1	1	1	1	1	1
Durango	2	4	2	2	2	2	2	2	2	2	2	2	2
Saltillo	10	8	7	4	3	3	4	4	3	3	3	3	3
Coras	5	6	10	12	8	11	6	5	5	5	5	6	4
Gavilanes	8	9	9	5	7	6	8	7	4	4	4	5	5
Tecos	11	11	12	8	6	5	7	8	9	6	6	4	6
Tritones Vallarta	4	2	3	3	5	4	3	6	8	9	7	7	7
Colima	13	12	13	7	9	7	10	9	6	7	8	8	8
Leones Negros	6	10	11	13	13	9	5	3	7	8	9	9	9
Cimarrones	12	5	4	6	4	8	9	10	11	10	11	12	10
UAT	3	7	8	11	10	12	13	13	10	12	10	10	11
UAZ	9	13	6	10	11	13	11	12	13	11	12	11	12
Catedráticos Elite	7	3	5	9	12	10	12	11	12	13	13	13	13
Fresnillo	14	14	14	14	14	14	14	14	14	14	14	14	14

Updated to match(es) played on 27 November 2021. Source: Liga Premier FMF

==== Results ====
Home \ Away	CAT	CIM	COL	COR	DUR	FRE	GAV	LNU	MAZ	SAL	TEC	TRV	UAT	UAZ
Catedráticos Elite	—	—	—	—	2–3	3–1	1–3	3–2	—	1–0	0–2	—	1–1	—
Cimarrones	3–0	—	0–1	0–3	—	—	—	—	1–2	2–2	—	—	3–0	5–1
Colima	3–0	—	—	—	1–0	5–0	—	2–1	1–2	1–2	—	—	—	—
Coras	2–2	—	3–2	—	0–3	4–0	—	—	0–2	0–1	—	—	—	—
Durango	—	2–1	—	—	—	3–0	1–0	2–1	—	—	2–0	3–1	2–1	—
Fresnillo	—	3–2	—	—	—	—	0–1	0–3	—	—	1–1	0–1	—	0–4
Gavilanes	—	2–1	3–1	0–0	—	—	—	—	0–3	—	—	4–0	2–0	2–1
Leones Negros	—	1–2	—	2–0	—	—	2–2	—	—	—	0–0	3–3	—	1–0
Mazorqueros	2–0	—	—	—	1–1	1–0	—	3–0	—	1–2	3–0	—	—	—
Saltillo	—	—	—	—	1–1	4–2	3–1	3–1	—	—	3–1	2–0	1–0	—
Tecos	—	3–0	1–1	2–1	—	—	2–0	—	—	—	—	2–1	—	3–0
Tritones Vallarta	4–0	0–0	3–0	0–3	—	—	—	—	1–5	—	—	—	3–2	4–2
UAT	—	—	0–0	0–2	—	3–0	—	1–1	0–1	—	2–1	—	—	3–1
UAZ	2–0	—	3–0	1–2	1–1	—	—	—	2–4	1–1	—	—	—	—

Updated to match(es) played on 27 November 2021. Source: Liga Premier
Legend: Blue = home team win; Yellow = draw; Red = away team win.

=== Group 2 ===
==== Standings ====
Pos	Team	Pld	W	D	L	GF	GA	GD	Pts	Qualification or relegation
1	Cafetaleros de Chiapas	12	10	1	1	31	8	+23	35	Liguilla de Ascenso
2	Inter Playa del Carmen	12	8	3	1	36	8	+28	30	Liguilla de Ascenso
3	La Piedad (Note: C.F. La Piedad was excluded from the tournament play-offs due to failure to pay its obligations as an affiliate of the Liga Premier FMF.)	12	7	3	2	20	8	+12	29	
4	Yalmakán	12	8	0	4	22	12	+10	26	Liguilla de Ascenso
5	Zap	12	7	0	5	21	18	+3	22	2021–22 Copa Conecta
6	Inter Querétaro	12	4	4	4	11	8	+3	17	2021–22 Copa Conecta
7	Sporting Canamy	12	4	2	6	11	21	−10	14	2021–22 Copa Conecta
8	Montañeses	12	3	4	5	15	16	−1	13	2021–22 Copa Conecta
9	Lobos ULMX	12	3	3	6	17	20	−3	13	
10	Dongu	12	3	3	6	12	21	−9	13	
11	Cañoneros	12	3	1	8	15	23	−8	12	
12	Escorpiones	12	3	1	8	15	25	−10	11	
13	Leviatán	12	2	1	9	8	46	−38	7	

Updated to match(es) played on 28 November 2021. Source: Liga Premier FMF

==== Positions by Round ====
Qualification to quarter-finals
Last place in table

Team ╲ Round	1	2	3	4	5	6	7	8	9	10	11	12	13
Cafetaleros	4	2	1	1	1	1	1	1	1	1	1	1	1†
Inter Playa	1	4	3	2	2	3	3	3	3	2	3†	3	2
La Piedad	2	1	2	3	3	2	2	2†	2	3	2	2	3
Yalmakán	13	7	4	5	5	5†	5	6	4	4	4	4	4
Zap	8†	5	9	11	7	9	6	5	7	5	5	5	5
Inter Querétaro	5	6†	7	9	10	10	10	7	5	6	6	6	6
Sporting Canamy (Note: Pending match against Leviatán (since Week 11))	7	12	8	10	11†	8	8	11	11	9	10	7	7
Montañeses	3	3	6†	6	8	7	7	9	9	10	8	9	8
Lobos ULMX	6	10	12	12	13	13	13†	13	13	13	13	12	9
Dongu	9	9	10	7	6	6	9	8	8†	7	7	8	10
Cañoneros	11	8	5	4	4	4	4	4	6	8†	9	10	11
Escorpiones	10	13	11	8	9	11	11	10	10	11	11	11†	12
Leviatán (Note: Pending match against Sporting Canamy (since Week 11))	12	11	13	13†	12	12	12	12	12	12	12	13	13

Updated to match(es) played on 28 November 2021. Source: Liga Premier FMF
Notes: † indicates team rested that round

==== Results ====
Home \ Away	CAF	CAÑ	DON	ESC	INP	INQ	LPD	LEV	LOB	MON	SCA	YAL	ZAP
Cafetaleros	—	—	4–0	—	3–2	—	—	—	1–2	3–1	1–1	—	2–1
Cañoneros	1–3	—	—	—	—	0–1	0–2	4–0	—	—	—	0–1	—
Dongu	—	1–0	—	2–1	—	—	—	—	2–2	2–3	1–2	—	0–2
Escorpiones	0–1	2–1	—	—	0–5	1–1	1–4	3–4	—	—	—	0–1	—
Inter Playa	—	3–0	1–0	—	—	—	1–1	—	3–0	—	7–1	3–0	—
Inter Querétaro	0–2	—	3–0	—	0–0	—	—	—	1–1	0–0	1–0	—	—
La Piedad	0–1	—	2–2	—	—	1–0	—	3–1	—	—	—	1–2	—
Leviatán	0–7	—	1–1	—	0–5	0–3	—	—	1–4	—	0–3	—	—
Lobos ULMX	—	2–3	—	1–3	—	—	0–1	—	—	3–2	0–0	—	1–2
Montañeses	—	2–2	—	1–2	1–1	—	0–0	0–1	—	—	—	3–0	1–0
Sporting Canamy	—	0–2	—	2–1	—	—	0–3	—	—	2–1	—	0–3	0–1
Yalmakán	0–3	—	0–1	—	—	1–0	—	10–0	1–0	—	—	—	—
Zap	—	6–2	—	2–1	1–5	2–1	0–2	3–0	—	—	—	1–3	—

Updated to match(es) played on 28 November 2021. Source: Liga Premier FMF
Legend: Blue = home team win; Yellow = draw; Red = away team win.

=== Regular season statistics ===
==== Top goalscorers ====
Players sorted first by goals scored, then by last name.

Rank	Player	Club	Goals
1	(Colombia) Klinsman Calderón	Inter Playa del Carmen	13
2	(Mexico) Carlo Vázquez	Yalmakán	11
3	(Mexico) Kevin Chaurand	Saltillo	10
3	(Mexico) Brandon Rosas	Durango	10
5	(Mexico) Humberto Guzmán	La Piedad	8
6	(Mexico) Jacob Morales	Cafetaleros de Chiapas	7
7	(Mexico) Jesús Damián Hernández	UAZ	6
7	(Mexico) Ronaldo Herrera	Cañoneros	6
7	(Mexico) Ulises Jaimes	Mazorqueros	6
7	(Mexico) Joao Maleck	Coras	6

Source:Liga Premier FMF

==== Hat-tricks ====
Player	For	Against	Result	Date	Round	Reference
(Mexico) Ulises Jaimes	Mazorqueros	Tritones Vallarta	1 – 5 (A)	6 November 2021	9	
(Colombia) Klinsman Calderón	Inter Playa del Carmen	Leviatán	0 – 5 (A)	10 November 2021	10	
(Colombia) Klinsman Calderón	Inter Playa del Carmen	Sporting Canamy	7 – 1 (H)	19 November 2021	12	
(Mexico) Carlo Vázquez	Yalmakán	Leviatán	10 – 0 (H)	21 November 2021	12	
(Mexico) Kevin Chaurand	Saltillo	Mineros de Fresnillo	4 – 2 (H)	27 November 2021	13	

(H) – Home; (A) – Away

=== Attendance ===
==== Per team ====
	Home match played behind closed doors
	Away match
	Rest week
	Match canceled
	Highest attended match
	Lowest attended match
PPD	Match postponed

Team	Week													Total Att	Avg.	Total Pld
Team	1	2	3	4	5	6	7	8	9	10	11	12	13	Total Att	Avg.	Total Pld
Cafetaleros de Chiapas		3,000	1,000		500		500		1,000		0			6500	1083	6
Catedráticos Elite		100		100		100		40	50		100		100	590	84	7
Cañoneros	500		150		70		50					50		820	164	5
Cimarrones de Sonora		0	0		0		0		0		0		0	0	0	0
Colima	0			250		150		500		400		300		1600	320	5
Coras	2,000		0		1,000			200		500		300		4000	800	5
Dongu	150		100		200			100		250		50		850	142	6
Durango	1,000		1,000		200		1,000		200		900		200	4500	643	7
Escorpiones	200		200		0		0		200		100		100	800	160	5
Fresnillo	100		100		50		150			50		50		500	83	6
Gavilanes		0		300		1,500		850		800	2,000		100	5550	925	6
Inter Playa	250		0		250		300		200			250		1250	250	5
Inter Querétaro				0		0	69		100		200		100	469	117	4
La Piedad	300		0			500				400		400		1600	400	4
Leones Negros	80		100			50		50		100		100		480	80	6
Leviatán		150				200		150		50			30	580	116	5
Lobos ULMX	150			800		200		150		0		20		1320	264	5
Mazorqueros		500		300		400		600		500			550	2850	475	6
Montañeses		2,000		2,000		1,500		1,000	2,000		500		1,200	10200	1457	7
Saltillo		700		300	500		300		500		2,000		1,500	5800	829	7
Sporting Canamy		0		100		100		50		100			0	350	88	4
Tecos		1,050		200		100		400		200		200		2150	358	6
Tritones Vallarta		1,000		1,000		1,000	300		300		200		500	4300	614	7
UAT	0		500		100		100		200		0	100		1000	200	5
UAZ	500		150		100		200		100			200		1250	208	6
Yalmakán		200		200				300		500		200		1400	280	5
Zap		400		100	50		100		50		200		200	1100	157	7
Total	5,230	9,100	3,300	5,650	3,020	5,800	3,069	4,390	4,900	3,850	6,700	2,220	4,580	61809	418	148

Source: Liga Premier FMF

==== Highest and lowest ====
Highest attended					Lowest attended			
Week	Home	Score	Away	Attendance	Home	Score	Away	Attendance
1	Coras	2–2	Catedráticos Elite	2,000	Leones Negros	2–2	Gavilanes de Matamoros	80
2	Cafetaleros de Chiapas	3–2	Inter Playa del Carmen	3,000	Catedráticos Elite	3–1	Mineros de Fresnillo	100
3	Alacranes de Durango	3–1	Tritones Vallarta	1,000	Deportivo Dongu	1–2	Sporting Canamy	100
4	Montañeses	1–2	Escorpiones	2,000	Zap	1–5	Inter Playa	100
5	Coras	3–2	Colima	1,000	Zap	2–1	Inter de Querétaro	50
6	Montañeses	1–0	Zap	1,500	Leones Negros	2–0	Coras	50
7	Alacranes de Durango	2–0	Tecos	1,000	Cañoneros	0–2	La Piedad	50
8	Montañeses	1–1	Inter Playa del Carmen	1,000	Catedráticos Elite	1–1	UAT	40
9	Montañeses	0–1	Leviatán	2,000	Zap	1–3	Yalmakán	50
10	Gavilanes de Matamoros	2–0	UAT	800	Leviatán	0–5	Inter Playa del Carmen	50
11	Gavilanes de Matamoros	0–3	Mazorqueros	2,000	Catedráticos Elite	0–2	Tecos	100
12	La Piedad	1–0	Inter Querétaro	400	Lobos ULMX	3–2	Montañeses	20
13	Saltillo	4–2	Mineros de Fresnillo	1,500	Leviatán	1–4	Lobos ULMX	30

Source: Liga Premier FMF

1. Does not include matches played behind closed doors.

=== Liguilla ===
The four best teams of each group play two games against each other on a home-and-away basis. The higher seeded teams play on their home field during the second leg. The winner of each match up is determined by aggregate score. In the quarterfinals and semifinals, if the two teams are tied on aggregate the higher seeded team advances. In the final, if the two teams are tied after both legs, the match goes to extra time and, if necessary, a penalty shoot-out.

Quarter-finals
2	Cafetaleros de Chiapas	2	3	5
7	Coras	0	3	3
3	Inter Playa del Carmen	2	3	5
6	Yalmakán	0	1	1
1	Mazorqueros (Note: Mazorqueros was qualified directly to the semi–finals for his best average in the season, this after the exclusion of C.F. La Piedad of the play–offs.)
4	Durango	1	1	2
5	Saltillo	0	0	0

Semi-finals
2	Cafetaleros de Chiapas	1	3	4 (3)
3	Inter Playa del Carmen (p.)	3	1	4 (5)
1	Mazorqueros	0	0	0
4	Durango	0	2	2

Final
3	Inter Playa del Carmen	0	0	0
4	Durango	1	0	1

==== Quarter-finals ====
The first legs were played on 1 and 2 December, and the second legs were played on 4 and 5 December 2021.

Team 1	Agg.	Team 2	1st leg	2nd leg
Cafetaleros de Chiapas	5–3	Coras	2–0	3–3
Durango	2–0	Saltillo	1–0	1–0
Inter Playa del Carmen	5–1	Yalmakán	2–0	3–1

===== First leg =====
1 December 2021	Saltillo	0–1	Durango	Saltillo, Coahuila
16:00 CST (UTC−6)		Report	García 65'	Stadium: Estadio Olímpico Francisco I. Madero; Attendance: 3,000; Referee: Hector Salvador Solorio Arreola (Jalisco)

1 December 2021	Coras	0–2	Cafetaleros de Chiapas	Tepic, Nayarit
20:30 MST (UTC−7)		Report	Acosta 1'; Vargas 63'	Stadium: Estadio Olímpico Santa Teresita; Attendance: 1,500; Referee: Julio César Gil Jiménez (Guanajuato)

2 December 2021	Yalmakán	0–2	Inter Playa del Carmen	Chetumal, Quintana Roo
15:00 EST (UTC−5)		Report	Calderón 55'; Rovira 69' (own)	Stadium: Estadio José López Portillo; Attendance: 700; Referee: Jorge Carlos Ortiz León

===== Second leg =====
4 December 2021	Cafetaleros de Chiapas	3–3 (5–3 agg.)	Coras	Tuxtla Gutiérrez, Chiapas
19:00 CST (UTC−6)	Vázquez 20'; Valanta 50'; Torres 86'	Report	Celada 33', 53'; Maleck 78'	Stadium: Estadio Víctor Manuel Reyna; Attendance: 2,700; Referee: Rafael Bonilla Vargas (State of Mexico)

4 December 2021	Durango	1–0 (2–0 agg.)	Saltillo	Durango City, Durango
20:00 CST (UTC−6)	Cantú 11'	Report		Stadium: Estadio Francisco Zarco; Attendance: 1,500; Referee: Mauricio Eleazar López Sánchez (Sinaloa)

5 December 2021	Inter Playa del Carmen	3–1 (5–1 agg.)	Yalmakán	Playa del Carmen, Quintana Roo
15:00 EST (UTC−5)	J. Sánchez 24', 63'; Calderón 76'	Report	Osorio 78'	Stadium: Unidad Deportiva Mario Villanueva Madrid; Attendance: 1,000; Referee: Ricardo Emmanuel Chávez Sánchez (Aguascalientes)

==== Semi-finals ====
The first legs were played on 9 December, and the second legs were played on 12 December 2021.

Team 1	Agg.	Team 2	1st leg	2nd leg
Mazorqueros	0–2	Durango	0–0	0–2
Cafetaleros de Chiapas	4–4 (3–5)	(p.) Inter Playa del Carmen	1–3	3–1

===== First leg =====
9 December 2021	Inter Playa del Carmen	3–1	Cafetaleros de Chiapas	Playa del Carmen, Quintana Roo
15:00 EST (UTC−5)	Cruz 34'; Calderón 47', 80'	Report	Valanta 3'	Stadium: Unidad Deportiva Mario Villanueva Madrid; Attendance: 1,400; Referee: Héctor Salvador Solorio Arreola (Jalisco)

9 December 2021	Durango	0–0	Mazorqueros	Durango City, Durango
20:00 CST (UTC−6)		Report		Stadium: Estadio Francisco Zarco; Attendance: 1,500; Referee: Iván Alberto Salazar Hernández (Baja California)

===== Second leg =====
12 December 2021	Mazorqueros	0–2 (0–2 agg.)	Durango	Ciudad Guzmán, Jalisco
15:45 CST (UTC−6)		Report	Guzmán 42'; Cantú 48'	Stadium: Estadio Municipal Santa Rosa; Attendance: 2,500; Referee: Ricardo Emmanuel Chávez Sánchez (Aguascalientes)

12 December 2021	Cafetaleros de Chiapas	3–1 (4–4 agg.) (3–5 p)	Inter Playa del Carmen	Tuxtla Gutiérrez, Chiapas
18:00 CST (UTC−6)	Acosta 49'; Valanta 53', 89'	Report	Bustos 47'	Stadium: Estadio Víctor Manuel Reyna; Attendance: 3,000; Referee: Mauricio Elezar López Sánchez (Sinaloa)
	Penalties
	Torres (penalty missed); Baéz (penalty scored); Gama (penalty scored); Vargas (penalty scored)		Jiménez (penalty scored); Hernández (penalty scored); Sánchez (penalty scored); Cruz (penalty scored); Calderón (penalty scored)

==== Final ====
The first leg was played on 15 December, and the second leg was played on 18 December 2021.

Team 1	Agg.	Team 2	1st leg	2nd leg
Inter Playa del Carmen	0–1	Durango	0–1	0–0

===== First leg =====
15 December 2021	Durango	1–0	Inter Playa del Carmen	Durango City, Durango
20:00 CST (UTC−6)	Rosas 32'	Report		Stadium: Estadio Francisco Zarco; Attendance: 5,500; Referee: Mauricio Eleazar López Sánchez (Sinaloa)

===== Second leg =====
18 December 2021	Inter Playa del Carmen	0–0 (0–1 agg.)	Durango	Playa del Carmen, Quintana Roo
15:00 EST (UTC−5)		Report		Stadium: Unidad Deportiva Mario Villanueva Madrid; Attendance: 5,000; Referee: Héctor Salvador Solorio Arreola (Jalisco)

Apertura 2021 winners

3rd title

== Torneo Clausura ==
The Torneo Clausura began in January 2022.

=== Group 1 ===
==== Standings ====
Pos	Team	Pld	W	D	L	GF	GA	GD	Pts	Qualification or relegation
1	Mazorqueros (C)	13	9	4	0	30	10	+20	34	Liguilla de Ascenso
2	Tritones Vallarta	13	8	2	3	23	12	+11	31	Liguilla de Ascenso
3	Alacranes de Durango	13	7	5	1	32	11	+21	29	Liguilla de Ascenso
4	Coras	13	7	4	2	20	12	+8	26	Liguilla de Ascenso
5	Saltillo	13	8	1	4	24	18	+6	26	
6	Cimarrones de Sonora	13	5	3	5	19	15	+4	20	
7	Gavilanes de Matamoros	13	3	8	2	14	9	+5	19	
8	UAZ	13	3	6	4	22	20	+2	17	
9	Tecos	13	3	6	4	13	19	−6	17	
10	Leones Negros UdeG	13	3	4	6	13	22	−9	13	
11	Colima	13	2	4	7	11	21	−10	11	
12	Mineros de Fresnillo	13	1	6	6	17	29	−12	11	
13	UAT	13	2	2	9	10	29	−19	9	
14	Catedráticos Elite	13	0	5	8	9	30	−21	5	

Updated to match(es) played on 10 April 2022. Source: Liga Premier FMF
(C) Champions

==== Positions by Round ====
Qualification to quarter-finals
Last place in table

Team ╲ Round	1	2	3	4	5	6	7	8	9	10	11	12	13
Mazorqueros	2	1	1	1	1	1	1	1	1	1	2	1	1
Tritones Vallarta	10	9	7	4	3	3	2	2	2	2	1	2	2
Durango	3	3	5	3	4	4	4	4	3	3	3	3	3
Coras	1	4	2	2	2	2	3	3	4	4	4	4	4
Saltillo	8	13	9	9	9	7	5	5	5	5	5	5	5
Cimarrones	4	2	3	7	5	5	7	7	6	6	7	8	6
Gavilanes	6	7	6	8	7	9	9	11	8	7	8	7	7
UAZ	12	10	4	6	8	6	6	6	7	8	6	6	8
Tecos	9	8	11	11	10	12	12	8	12	9	9	9	9
Leones Negros	7	11	12	12	13	13	13	13	13	13	13	12	10
Colima	13	12	8	5	6	8	8	10	11	12	12	11	11
Fresnillo	5	5	10	10	12	10	10	9	10	10	10	10	12
UAT	11	14	14	13	11	11	11	12	9	11	11	13	13
Catedráticos Elite	14	6	13	14	14	14	14	14	14	14	14	14	14

Updated to match(es) played on 10 April 2022. Source: Liga Premier FMF

==== Results ====
Home \ Away	CAT	CIM	COL	COR	DUR	FRE	GAV	LNU	MAZ	SAL	TEC	TRV	UAT	UAZ
Catedráticos Elite	—	1–2	3–3	0–2	—	—	—	—	0–2	—	—	1–3	—	0–2
Cimarrones	—	—	—	—	1–1	2–2	0–0	4–0	—	—	0–1	1–3	—	—
Colima	—	0–1	—	0–1	—	—	0–0	—	—	—	0–1	0–2	1–0	1–1
Coras	—	2–1	—	—	—	—	1–1	3–0	—	—	1–0	1–0	2–0	2–2
Durango	6–0	—	6–1	0–0	—	—	—	—	1–1	3–1	—	—	—	1–1
Fresnillo	2–2	—	0–0	5–3	2–3	—	—	—	1–3	0–5	—	—	1–3	—
Gavilanes	3–0	—	—	—	1–1	1–0	—	1–1	—	1–2	1–1	—	—	—
Leones Negros	0–0	—	1–2	—	2–4	0–0	—	—	0–1	2–1	—	—	0–1	—
Mazorqueros	—	2–1	3–2	1–1	—	—	0–0	—	—	—	—	1–0	5–1	4–0
Saltillo	3–0	2–1	2–1	2–1	—	—	—	—	1–5	—	—	—	—	1–0
Tecos	1–1	—	—	—	0–2	2–2	—	1–1	2–2	1–2	—	—	2–1	—
Tritones Vallarta	—	—	—	—	1–0	4–1	1–0	1–2	—	2–1	1–1	—	—	—
UAT	1–1	0–2	—	—	0–4	—	0–3	—	—	1–1	—	1–3	—	—
UAZ	—	1–3	—	—	—	1–1	1–1	2–3	—	—	5–0	2–2	4–1	—

Updated to match(es) played on 10 April 2022. Source: Liga Premier
Legend: Blue = home team win; Yellow = draw; Red = away team win.

=== Group 2 ===
==== Standings ====
Pos	Team	Pld	W	D	L	GF	GA	GD	Pts	Qualification or relegation
1	Inter Playa del Carmen	12	9	2	1	31	9	+22	31	Liguilla de Ascenso
2	Cafetaleros de Chiapas	12	8	4	0	31	6	+25	29	Liguilla de Ascenso
3	Yalmakán	12	7	3	2	15	4	+11	27	Liguilla de Ascenso
4	Escorpiones	12	7	0	5	22	21	+1	23	Liguilla de Ascenso
5	Montañeses	12	6	2	4	19	12	+7	22	
6	Zap	12	6	1	5	22	17	+5	21	
7	Sporting Canamy	12	5	3	4	17	14	+3	20	
8	La Piedad	12	5	3	4	21	12	+9	19	
9	Lobos ULMX	12	5	3	4	11	12	−1	18	
10	Cañoneros	12	4	1	7	10	25	−15	14	
11	Inter Querétaro	12	1	3	8	6	27	−21	7	
12	Dongu	12	2	0	10	15	29	−14	6	
13	Leviatán	12	0	1	11	6	38	−32	1	

Updated to match(es) played on 10 April 2022. Source: Liga Premier FMF

==== Positions by Round ====
Qualification to quarter-finals
Last place in table

Team ╲ Round	1	2	3	4	5	6	7	8	9	10	11	12	13
Inter Playa	5	6	2	3	5	4	2	2	1	1	2†	2	1
Cafetaleros	2	1	1	1	1	1	1	1	2	2	1	1	2†
Yalmakán	6	2	4	4	2	3†	6	7	7	3	3	3	3
Escorpiones	12	13	5	5	3	5	3	3	5	5	5	4†	4
Montañeses	1	3	6†	7	8	8	9	9	8	7	8	7	5
Zap	11†	11	13	12	9	9	8	8	9	9	6	5	6
Sporting Canamy	3	4	3	2	4†	2	4	4	3	4	4	6	7
La Piedad	9	7	8	9	7	7	5	6†	4	6	7	8	8
Lobos ULMX	4	8	9	6	6	6	7†	5	6	8	9	9	9
Cañoneros	7	9	10	11	12	11	10	10	10	10†	10	10	10
Inter Querétaro	8	10†	12	13	13	13	11	11	11	11	11	11	11
Dongu	13	5	7	8	10	10	12	12	12†	12	12	12	12
Leviatán	10	12	11	10†	11	12	13	13	13	13	13	13	13

Updated to match(es) played on 10 April 2022. Source: Liga Premier FMF
Notes: † indicates team rested that round

==== Results ====
Home \ Away	CAF	CAÑ	DON	ESC	INP	INQ	LPD	LEV	LOB	MON	SCA	YAL	ZAP
Cafetaleros	—	8–0	—	4–2	—	4–0	2–0	4–0	—	—	—	1–0	—
Cañoneros	—	—	1–0	0–1	0–1	—	—	—	0–1	1–1	1–3	—	3–2
Dongu	1–2	—	—	—	1–4	6–1	0–4	2–1	—	—	—	0–2	—
Escorpiones	—	—	5–3	—	—	—	—	—	0–1	3–2	0–1	—	1–0
Inter Playa	0–0	—	—	6–1	—	3–0	—	4–0	—	4–1	—	—	3–2
Inter Querétaro	—	0–1	—	0–2	—	—	1–1	2–2	—	—	—	0–2	0–3
La Piedad	—	5–0	—	3–1	2–0	—	—	—	1–2	0–3	1–1	—	1–2
Leviatán	—	0–3	—	1–5	—	—	0–3	—	—	0–4	—	1–3	0–4
Lobos ULMX	0–0	—	2–0	—	1–4	0–0	—	1–0	—	—	—	0–1	—
Montañeses	1–1	—	3–0	—	—	1–2	—	—	1–0	—	1–0	—	—
Sporting Canamy	1–1	—	2–1	—	1–2	2–0	—	3–1	2–2	—	—	—	—
Yalmakán	—	3–0	—	0–1	0–0	—	0–0	—	—	1–0	2–0	—	1–1
Zap	1–4	—	2–1	—	—	—	—	—	3–1	0–1	2–1	—	—

Updated to match(es) played on 10 April 2022. Source: Liga Premier FMF
Legend: Blue = home team win; Yellow = draw; Red = away team win.

=== Regular season statistics ===
==== Top goalscorers ====
Players sorted first by goals scored, then by last name.

Rank	Player	Club	Goals
1	(Mexico) Diego Gama	Cafetaleros de Chiapas	15
2	(Colombia) Klinsman Calderón	Inter Playa del Carmen	14
2	(Mexico) Brandon Rosas	Durango	14
4	(Mexico) Julian Barajas	Tritones Vallarta	7
4	(Mexico) Kevin Chaurand	Saltillo	7
4	(Mexico) Christopher Cortés	UAZ	7
4	(Mexico) Isaac Diarte	Zap	7
4	(Mexico) Ronaldo Herrera	Sporting Canamy	7
4	(Mexico) Abraham Vázquez	Cafetaleros de Chiapas	7
10	(Mexico) Juan Celada	Coras	6
10	(Mexico) José Coronel	Tritones Vallarta	6
10	(Mexico) Brayan Grijalva	Zap	6
10	(Mexico) Humberto Guzmán	La Piedad	6
10	(Mexico) Ulises Jaimes	Mazorqueros	6
10	(Mexico) Joao Maleck	Coras	6
10	(Mexico) José Ocampo	Dongu	6
10	(Mexico) Carlo Vázquez	Yalmakán	6
10	(Mexico) Alejandro Villa	Montañeses	6

Source:Liga Premier FMF

==== Hat-tricks ====
Player	For	Against	Result	Date	Round	Reference
(Mexico) Brandon Rosas	Durango	Catedráticos Elite	6 – 0 (H)	4 February 2022	4	
(Colombia) Klinsman Calderón	Inter Playa del Carmen	Dongu	1 – 4 (A)	26 February 2022	7	
(Mexico) Diego Gama	Cafetaleros de Chiapas	Cañoneros	8 – 0 (H)	2 April 2022	12	
(Colombia) Klinsman Calderón	Inter Playa del Carmen	Escorpiones	6 – 1 (H)	8 April 2022	13	
(Mexico) Brandon Rosas	Durango	UAT	0 – 4 (A)	9 April 2022	13	

(H) – Home; (A) – Away

=== Attendance ===
==== Per team ====
Pos	Team	Total	High	Low	Average	Change
1	Cafetaleros de Chiapas	12,500	4,000	1,000	2,083	+92.3%
2	Durango	4,900	1,500	300	817	+27.1%
3	Coras	4,950	1,500	200	707	−11.6%
4	Montañeses	3,500	1,000	300	700	−52.0%
5	Saltillo	2,900	1,000	200	483	−41.7%
6	Yalmakán	2,450	500	200	350	+25.0%
7	La Piedad	2,050	500	150	342	−14.5%^{1}
8	Inter Playa	1,700	400	200	283	+13.2%
9	Tritones Vallarta	1,600	400	100	267	−56.5%
10	Mazorqueros	1,870	500	70	267	−43.8%
11	Tecos	1,400	500	100	233	−34.9%^{1}
12	Gavilanes	700	300	100	175	−81.1%^{2}
13	Colima	1,200	300	50	171	−46.6%
14	Escorpiones	850	200	150	170	+6.3%
15	Dongu	820	300	50	137	−3.5%
16	UAZ	950	500	50	136	−34.6%
17	Lobos ULMX	780	200	50	130	−50.8%
18	Inter Querétaro	350	250	50	117	0.0%^{2}
19	Sporting Canamy	550	150	50	110	+25.0%^{1}
21	Leviatán	500	200	50	100	−13.8%
20	Zap	400	100	50	80	−49.0%
22	Fresnillo	552	102	50	79	−4.8%
23	UAT	200	100	50	67	−66.5%^{2}
24	Cañoneros	450	100	20	64	−61.0%
25	Leones Negros	400	100	50	57	−28.7%
26	Catedráticos Elite	300	100	30	50	−40.5%
27	Cimarrones de Sonora	50	50	50	50	n/a^{5}
	League total	48,572	4,000	20	322	−23.0%

Source: Liga Premier FMF
Notes:
The number listed represents the number of home matches the club played behind closed doors.

==== Highest and lowest ====
Highest attended					Lowest attended			
Week	Home	Score	Away	Attendance	Home	Score	Away	Attendance
1	Cafetaleros de Chiapas	4–2	Escorpiones	2,000	Catedráticos Elite	0–2	Coras	50
2	Durango	3–1	Saltillo	600	Cañoneros	1–1	Montañeses	20
3	Tecos	1–1	Leones Negros	500	Catedráticos Elite	0–2	UAZ	30
4	Cafetaleros de Chiapas	4–0	Inter de Querétaro	1,000	Mineros de Fresnillo	1–3	Mazorqueros	50
5	Montañeses	1–1	Cafetaleros de Chiapas	800	Colima	0–1	Coras	50
6	Durango	1–1	Mazorqueros	1,500	UAZ	5–0	Tecos	50
7	Coras	2–0	UAT	1,200	Catedráticos Elite	1–3	Tritones Vallarta	50
8	Cafetaleros de Chiapas	1–0	Yalmakán	2,000	Inter Querétaro	2–2	Leviatán	50
9	Coras	2–2	UAZ	550	Cañoneros	0–1	Inter Playa	50
10	Cafetaleros de Chiapas	2–0	La Piedad	2,500	Zap	3–1	Lobos ULMX	50
11	Coras	2–1	Cimarrones de Sonora	500	Leones Negros	2–1	Saltillo	50
12	Cafetaleros de Chiapas	8–0	Cañoneros	4,000	Catedráticos Elite	3–3	Colima	20
13	Coras	1–0	Tritones Vallarta	1,500	Cañoneros	3–2	Zap	50

Source: Liga Premier FMF

1. Does not include matches played behind closed doors.

=== Liguilla ===
The four best teams of each group play two games against each other on a home-and-away basis. The higher seeded teams play on their home field during the second leg. The winner of each match up is determined by aggregate score. In the quarterfinals and semifinals, if the two teams are tied on aggregate the higher seeded team advances. In the final, if the two teams are tied after both legs, the match goes to extra time and, if necessary, a penalty shoot-out.

Quarter-finals
1	Mazorqueros	2	7	9
8	Escorpiones	1	0	1
4	Tritones Vallarta	1	1	2
5	Yalmakán	0	1	1
2	Inter Playa del Carmen	2	1	3
7	Coras	1	1	2
3	Cafetaleros de Chiapas	1	1	2
6	Durango	1	0	1

Semi-finals
1	Mazorqueros (p.)	2	0	2 (5)
4	Tritones Vallarta	1	1	2 (4)
2	Inter Playa del Carmen	0	0	0
3	Cafetaleros de Chiapas	0	1	1

Final
1	Mazorqueros (p.)	0	0	0 (4)
3	Cafetaleros de Chiapas	0	0	0 (2)

==== Quarter-finals ====
The first legs were played on 14, 15 and 16 April, and the second legs were played on 22 and 23 April 2022.

Team 1	Agg.	Team 2	1st leg	2nd leg
Mazorqueros	9–1	Escorpiones	2–1	7–0
Tritones Vallarta	2–1	Yalmakán	1–0	1–1
Inter Playa del Carmen	3–2	Coras	2–1	1–1
Cafetaleros de Chiapas	2–1	Durango	1–1	1–0

===== First leg =====
15 April 2022	Durango	1–1	Cafetaleros de Chiapas	Durango City, Durango
20:00 CDT (UTC−5)	Rodríguez 6'	Report	Gama 85'	Stadium: Estadio Francisco Zarco; Attendance: 4,000; Referee: Jesús Enrique Herrera Armenta

15 April 2022	Coras	1–2	Inter Playa del Carmen	Tepic, Nayarit
20:30 MDT (UTC−6)	García 4'	Report	Calderón 48'; Bustos 81'	Stadium: Estadio Olímpico Santa Teresita; Attendance: 1,000; Referee: Jaime Orlando Montes Santos

16 April 2022	Escorpiones	1–2	Mazorqueros	Cuernavaca, Morelos
16:00 CDT (UTC−5)	Vázquez 11'	Report	Salas 79'; Monarrez 88'	Stadium: Estadio Centenario; Attendance: 200; Referee: Rosario Guadalupe Cárdenas Morales

17 April 2022	Yalmakán	0–1	Tritones Vallarta	Chetumal, Quintana Roo
16:00 EST (UTC−5)		Report	Coronel 54'	Stadium: Estadio José López Portillo; Attendance: 850; Referee: Diego Gilberto Gurrea Mendoza

===== Second leg =====
22 April 2022	Inter Playa del Carmen	1–1 (3–2 agg.)	Coras	Playa del Carmen, Quintana Roo
16:00 CDT (UTC−5)	González 31'	Report	Gutiérrez 61'	Stadium: Unidad Deportiva Mario Villanueva Madrid; Attendance: 1,000; Referee: Enrique Augusto Ramírez Gutiérrez

23 April 2022	Tritones Vallarta	1–1 (2–1 agg.)	Yalmakán	Bahía de Banderas, Nayarit
16:30 CDT (UTC−5)	Escalante 90+5'	Report	Vázquez 15'	Stadium: Ciudad del Deporte San José del Valle; Attendance: 1,500; Referee: Miguel Ángel Morales Sánchez

23 April 2022	Mazorqueros	7–0 (9–1 agg.)	Escorpiones	Ciudad Guzmán, Jalisco
17:30 CDT (UTC−5)	Monárrez 11', 25'; Jaimes 40', 62'; González 73'; Mosquera 76'; A. Mendoza 86'	Report		Stadium: Estadio Municipal Santa Rosa; Attendance: 850; Referee: Juan Francisco Sánchez Leal

23 April 2022	Cafetaleros de Chiapas	1–0 (2–1 agg.)	Durango	Tuxtla Gutiérrez, Chiapas
19:00 CDT (UTC−5)	Torres 90+1'	Report		Stadium: Estadio Víctor Manuel Reyna; Attendance: 4,500; Referee: Mauricio Eleazar López Sánchez

==== Semi-finals ====
The first legs were played on 27 April, and the second legs were played on 30 April 2022.

Team 1	Agg.	Team 2	1st leg	2nd leg
Mazorqueros (p.)	2–2 (5–4)	Tritones Vallarta	2–1	0–1
Inter Playa del Carmen	0–1	Cafetaleros de Chiapas	0–0	0–1

===== First leg =====
27 April 2022	Tritones Vallarta	1–2	Mazorqueros	Bahía de Banderas, Nayarit
16:30 CDT (UTC−5)	Barajas 32'	Report	R. Mendoza 29', 57'	Stadium: Ciudad del Deporte San José del Valle; Attendance: 1,000; Referee: Enrique Augusto Medina Gutiérrez

27 April 2022	Cafetaleros de Chiapas	0–0	Inter Playa del Carmen	Tuxtla Gutiérrez, Chiapas
20:00 CDT (UTC−5)		Report		Stadium: Estadio Víctor Manuel Reyna; Attendance: 6,000; Referee: Emmanuel Montano Mendoza

===== Second leg =====
30 April 2022	Inter Playa del Carmen	0–1 (0–1 agg.)	Cafetaleros de Chiapas	Playa del Carmen, Quintana Roo
16:00 EST (UTC−5)		Report	Morales 58'	Stadium: Unidad Deportiva Mario Villanueva Madrid; Attendance: 3,000; Referee: Juan Francisco Sánchez Leal

30 April 2022	Mazorqueros	0–1 (2–2 agg.) (5–4 p)	Tritones Vallarta	Ciudad Guzmán, Jalisco
17:30 CDT (UTC−5)		Report	Mendoza 9'	Stadium: Estadio Municipal Santa Rosa; Attendance: 1,500; Referee: Mauricio Eleazar López Sánchez
	Penalties
	Monárrez (penalty missed); Reyes (penalty scored); Jaimes (penalty scored); A. Mendoza (penalty scored); R. Mendoza (penalty scored); Salas (penalty scored)		López (penalty missed); Beltrán (penalty scored); Hernández (penalty scored); Coronel (penalty scored); Rodríguez (penalty scored); Rivera (penalty missed)

==== Final ====
The first leg was played on 5 May, and the second leg was played on 8 May 2022.

Team 1	Agg.	Team 2	1st leg	2nd leg
Mazorqueros	0–0 (4–2)	Cafetaleros de Chiapas	0–0	0–0

===== First leg =====
5 May 2022	Cafetaleros de Chiapas	0–0	Mazorqueros	Tuxtla Gutiérrez, Chiapas
20:00 CDT (UTC−5)		Report		Stadium: Estadio Víctor Manuel Reyna; Attendance: 20,000; Referee: Juan Francisco Sánchez Leal

===== Second leg =====
8 May 2022	Mazorqueros	0–0 (0–0 agg.) (4–2 p)	Cafetaleros de Chiapas	Ciudad Guzmán, Jalisco
16:30 CDT (UTC−5)		Report		Stadium: Estadio Municipal Santa Rosa; Attendance: 3,500; Referee: Mauricio Eleazar López Sánchez
	Penalties
	Reyes (penalty scored); Mosquera (penalty scored); Jaimes (penalty scored); A. Mendoza (penalty scored)		Báez (penalty scored); Guillen (penalty missed); Valanta (penalty missed); Sibaja (penalty scored)

Clausura 2022 winners

1st title

== Coefficient table ==
P	Team	Pts	G	Pts/G	GD
1	Mazorqueros	72	26	2.769	+43
2	Cafetaleros de Chiapas	64	24	2.667	+47
3	Inter Playa del Carmen	61	24	2.542	+51
4	Alacranes de Durango	60	26	2.308	+35
5	Yalmakán	53	24	2.208	+21
6	Saltillo	57	26	2.192	+19
7	La Piedad	48	24	2.000	+21
8	Coras	50	26	1.923	+14
9	Tritones Vallarta	49	26	1.885	+6
10	Zap	43	24	1.792	+8
11	Gavilanes de Matamoros	42	26	1.615	+10
12	Tecos	39	26	1.500	–2
13	Montañeses	35	24	1.458	+7
14	Sporting Canamy	34	24	1.417	–7
15	Escorpiones	34	24	1.417	–7
16	Cimarrones de Sonora	34	26	1.308	+4
17	Lobos ULMX	31	24	1.292	–5
18	UAZ	29	26	1.115	–5
19	Cañoneros	26	24	1.083	–23
20	Colima	28	26	1.077	–10
21	Leones Negros UdeG	28	26	1.077	–11
22	Inter Querétaro	24	24	1.000	–18
23	UAT	21	26	0.808	–24
24	Dongu	19	24	0.792	–24
25	Catedráticos Elite	16	26	0.615	–35
26	Mineros de Fresnillo	15	26	0.577	–41
27	Leviatán	8	24	0.333	–69

Last updated: April 10, 2022
Source: Liga Premier FMF
P = Position; G = Games played; Pts = Points; Pts/G = Ratio of points to games played; GD = Goal difference

== Promotion Final ==
The Promotion Final is a series of matches played by the champions of the tournaments Apertura and Clausura, the game is played to determine the winning team of the promotion to Liga de Expansión MX, as long as the winning team meets the league requirements.

The first leg were played on 12 May 2022, and the second leg were played on 15 May 2022.

Team 1	Agg.	Team 2	1st leg	2nd leg
Mazorqueros	2–5	Durango	0–1	2–4

=== First leg ===
12 May 2022	Durango	1–0	Mazorqueros	Durango City, Durango
20:45 CDT (UTC−5)	Muñoz 37'	Report		Stadium: Estadio Francisco Zarco; Attendance: 8,000; Referee: José Enrique Herrera Armenta

=== Second leg ===
15 May 2022	Mazorqueros	2–4 (2–5 agg.)	Durango	Ciudad Guzmán, Jalisco
16:30 CDT (UTC−5)	Monarrez 22', 30'	Report	Rosas 15', 20'; A. Mendoza 52' (own); Rodríguez 68'	Stadium: Estadio Municipal Santa Rosa; Attendance: 2,000; Referee: Mauricio Eleazar López Sánchez

2021–22 winners

3rd title

== See also ==
- 2021–22 Liga MX season
- 2021–22 Liga de Expansión MX season
- 2021–22 Serie B de México season
- 2021–22 Liga TDP season
- 2021–22 Copa Conecta
