= 2012–13 Liga de Nuevos Talentos season =

Liga de Nuevos Talentos
- Season: 2012–13
- Dates: 24 August 2012 – 18 May 2013
- Champions: Apertura: Académicos; Clausura; Alacranes de Durango
- Promoted: Alacranes de Durango
- Relegated: Bavaria Tultitlán
- Stats are from the regular season only

The 2012–13 Liga de Nuevos Talentos season was split in two tournaments Apertura and Clausura. Liga de Nuevos Talentos was the fourth–tier football league of Mexico. The season was played between 24 August 2012 and 18 May 2013.

== Teams ==
=== Group 1 ===
Location of teams in the 2012–13 LNT Group 1

Club	City	Stadium	Capacity
América Coapa	Mexico City	Instalaciones Club América	1,000
Atlante Tabasco	Villahermosa, Tabasco	CAR Atlante Tabasco	1,000
Atlético Chiapas	Tuxtla Gutiérrez, Chiapas	Víctor Manuel Reyna	29,001
Bavaria Tultitlán	Tultitlán, State of Mexico	Deportivo Cartagena	1,000
Cañoneros	Campeche, Campeche	Universitario de Campeche	4,000
Centro Universitario del Fútbol	San Agustín Tlaxiaca, Hidalgo	Universidad del Fútbol	1,000
Cuautla	Cuautla, Morelos	Isidro Gil Tapia	5,000
Deportivo Chimalhuacán	Chimalhuacán, State of Mexico	Tepalcates	5,000
Lobos Prepa	Puebla, Puebla	Universitario BUAP	19,283
Pioneros de Cancún	Cancún, Quintana Roo	Cancún 86	6,390
Pumas Naucalpan	Mexico City	La Cantera	2,000
Tulancingo	Tulancingo, Hidalgo	Primero de Mayo	2,500
UAEH	Pachuca, Hidalgo	Revolución Mexicana	3,500
Zacatepec 1948	Zacatepec, Morelos	Agustín Coruco Díaz	16,000

=== Group 2 ===
Location of teams in the 2012–13 LNT Group 2

Club	City	Stadium	Capacity
Académicos de Atlas	Zapopan, Jalisco	Club Atlas Chapalita; Alfredo "Pistache" Torres	1,000; 3,000
Alacranes de Durango	Durango City, Durango	Francisco Zarco	18,000
Cachorros UANL	General Zuazua, Nuevo León	Instalaciones de Zuazua	800
Calor de San Pedro	San Pedro, Coahuila	Unidad Deportiva San Pedro	2,000
Colegio Once México	Zapopan, Jalisco	Colegio Once México	3,000
Irapuato "B"	Irapuato, Guanajuato	Sergio León Chávez	25,000
La Piedad "B"	Silao, Guanajuato	Municipal de Silao	3,000
Necaxa "B"	Aguascalientes, Aguascalientes	Casa Club Necaxa	1,000
Oro	Guadalajara, Jalisco	Jalisco; Club La Primavera	56,713; 3,000
Santos Los Mochis	Los Mochis, Sinaloa	Centenario	11,134
Topos de Reynosa	Reynosa, Tamaulipas	Adolfo López Mateos; Unidad Deportiva Solidaridad	10,000; 20,000
Tuzos UAZ	Zacatecas City, Zacatecas	Universitario Unidad Deportiva Norte	5,000

== Torneo Apertura ==
=== Regular season ===
==== Group 1 ====
===== Standings =====
Pos	Team	Pld	W	D	L	GF	GA	GD	Pts	Qualification or relegation
1	América Coapa	13	9	2	2	23	12	+11	29	Promotion Playoffs
2	Titanes de Tulancingo	13	9	0	4	31	12	+19	27	Promotion Playoffs
3	Zacatepec 1948	13	8	2	3	29	13	+16	26	Promotion Playoffs
4	Garzas UAEH	13	7	3	3	26	14	+12	24	Promotion Playoffs
5	Atlético Chiapas	13	7	1	5	18	13	+5	22	Promotion Playoffs
6	Pumas Naucalpan	13	7	1	5	21	20	+1	22	Promotion Playoffs
7	Pioneros de Cancún	13	6	3	4	28	14	+14	21	Promotion Playoffs
8	Cañoneros de Campeche	13	5	4	4	24	19	+5	19	Promotion Playoffs
9	Centro Universitario del Fútbol	13	5	3	5	29	25	+4	18	Promotion Playoffs
10	Lobos Prepa	13	4	2	7	19	24	−5	14	
11	Deportivo Chimalhuacán	13	3	3	7	21	29	−8	12	
12	Cuautla	13	2	5	6	11	23	−12	11	
13	Atlante Tabasco	13	3	2	8	11	30	−19	11	
14	Bavaria Tultitlán	13	0	1	12	10	53	−43	1	

Source: Segunda División FMF

===== Results =====
Home \ Away	AME	ATB	ATC	BAV	CAM	CUF	CUA	CHI	LOB	PIO	PUM	TUL	UEH	ZAC
América Coapa	—	3–1	—	—	—	2–1	—	—	1–0	1–1	1–3	—	—	2–1
Atlante Tabasco	—	—	—	4–2	1–1	—	2–1	—	0–1	—	1–2	1–0	—	0–3
Atlético Chiapas	1–2	3–0	—	—	—	0–2	—	2–0	—	2–1	—	—	—	1–1
Bavaria Tultitlán	0–3	—	0–2	—	—	2–7	2–2	0–3	—	1–4	—	—	0–2	—
Cañoneros de Campeche	2–0	—	2–3	4–1	—	—	1–1	2–0	—	—	—	1–3	1–1	—
C.U. Fútbol	—	1–1	—	—	1–3	—	2–1	—	3–2	1–1	4–0	—	—	1–2
Cuautla	0–0	—	1–2	—	—	—	—	1–1	2–1	—	0–3	—	1–1	1–0
Dep. Chimalhuacán	1–4	4–0	—	—	—	3–3	—	—	2–2	1–4	—	—	—	2–3
Lobos Prepa	—	—	1–0	6–1	4–3	—	—	—	—	—	1–2	0–3	1–1	—
Pioneros	—	4–0	—	—	1–2	—	3–0	—	5–0	—	1–0	1–3	—	1–1
Pumas Naucalpan	—	—	2–1	2–0	1–1	—	—	4–1	—	—	—	1–4	0–2	—
Tulancingo	1–3	—	1–0	6–1	—	3–0	5–0	2–0	—	—	—	—	0–2	—
Garzas UAEH	0–1	5–0	0–1	—	—	5–3	—	2–3	—	2–1	—	—	—	—
Zacatepec 1948	—	—	—	8–0	2–1	—	—	—	1–0	—	3–1	2–0	2–3	—

Source: Segunda División FMF
Legend: Blue = home team win; Yellow = draw; Red = away team win.

==== Group 2 ====
===== Standings =====
Pos	Team	Pld	W	D	L	GF	GA	GD	Pts	Qualification or relegation
1	Alacranes de Durango	11	6	5	0	28	13	+15	25	Promotion Playoffs
2	Cachorros UANL	11	8	0	3	28	15	+13	24	Promotion Playoffs
3	Necaxa "B"	11	6	3	2	21	16	+5	22	Promotion Playoffs
4	Académicos de Atlas	11	6	2	3	29	12	+17	20	Promotion Playoffs
5	Colegio Once México	11	5	1	5	13	20	−7	16	Promotion Playoffs
6	Calor de San Pedro	11	4	3	4	13	23	−10	16	Promotion Playoffs
7	La Piedad "B"	11	4	3	4	20	14	+6	15	Promotion Playoffs
8	Oro	11	5	0	6	23	27	−4	15	
9	Tuzos UAZ	11	4	2	5	23	19	+4	14	
10	Santos Los Mochis	11	3	1	7	11	17	−6	10	
11	Irapuato "B"	11	3	1	7	11	19	−8	10	
12	Topos de Reynosa	11	1	1	9	9	34	−25	4	

Source: Segunda División FMF

===== Results =====
Home \ Away	ACA	ALD	CAC	CAL	COM	IRA	LPD	NEC	ORO	SLM	TOP	UAZ
Académicos	—	1–2	—	8–0	1–2	—	—	0–0	—	3–0	—	—
Alacranes	—	—	3–0	—	0–0	4–1	2–2	4–2	—	—	—	2–2
Cachorros UANL	2–1	—	—	—	—	4–1	—	—	3–2	—	5–0	3–1
Calor de San Pedro	—	2–2	1–3	—	3–1	—	2–1	1–1	—	1–1	2–0	—
Colegio Once México	—	—	0–3	—	—	1–0	—	3–2	2–3	—	—	2–0
Irapuato	0–4	—	—	0–1	—	—	0–0	—	2–1	—	5–0	1–0
La Piedad	1–1	—	4–2	—	4–0	—	—	1–3	1–2	—	4–0	—
Necaxa	—	—	2–1	—	—	2–1	—	—	2–1	—	3–1	3–3
Oro	3–4	0–5	—	3–0	—	—	—	—	—	2–1	4–1	—
Santos Los Mochis	—	1–2	0–2	—	3–0	2–0	0–1	0–1	—	—	—	—
Topos Reynosa	1–4	2–2	—	—	1–2	—	—	—	—	1–2	—	—
Tuzos UAZ	1–2	—	—	3–0	—	—	2–1	—	6–2	4–1	1–2	—

Source: Segunda División FMF
Legend: Blue = home team win; Yellow = draw; Red = away team win.

=== Liguilla ===
The nine and seven best teams of each group play two games against each other on a home-and-away basis. The higher seeded teams play on their home field during the second leg. The winner of each match up is determined by aggregate score. In the round of 16, quarterfinals and semifinals, if the two teams are tied on aggregate the higher seeded team advances. In the final, if the two teams are tied after both legs, the match goes to extra time and, if necessary, a penalty shoot-out.

Round of 16
2	Tulancingo	3	1	4
13	C.U. Fútbol	0	0	0
3	Zacatepec 1948 (s.)	1	1	2
8	Atlético Chiapas	1	1	2
6	Cachorros UANL (s.)	0	2	2
14	Colegio Once México	0	2	2
5	Garzas UAEH (s.)	0	2	2
10	Pioneros	1	1	2
1	América Coapa	1	5	6
16	La Piedad	1	2	3
12	Cañoneros	1	1	2
7	Necaxa	1	0	1
4	Alacranes	5	6	11
15	Calor de San Pedro	0	1	1
11	Académicos	1	4	5
9	Pumas Naucalpan	2	0	2

Quarter-finals
2	Tulancingo	3	0	3
3	Zacatepec 1948	3	1	4
6	Cachorros UANL	0	1	1
5	Garzas UAEH	5	1	6
1	América Coapa	0	3	3
12	Cañoneros	1	0	1
4	Alacranes	1	0	1
11	Académicos	1	2	3

Semi-finals
3	Zacatepec	1	2	3
5	Garzas UAEH	2	2	4
1	América Coapa	1	2	3
11	Académicos	3	2	5

Final
5	Garzas UAEH	0	1	1
11	Académicos	1	2	3

==== Round of 8 ====
Team 1	Agg.	Team 2	1st leg	2nd leg
Titanes de Tulancingo	4–0	C.U. Fútbol	3–0	1–0
Zacatepec 1948 (s.)	2–2	Atlético Chiapas	1–1	1–1
Cachorros UANL (s.)	2–2	Colegio Once México	0–1	2–1
Garzas UAEH (s.)	2–1	Pioneros de Cancún	0–1	2–1
América Coapa	6–3	La Piedad	1–1	5–2
Cañoneros de Campeche	2–1	Necaxa	1–1	1–0
Alacranes de Durango	11–1	Calor de San Pedro	5–0	6–1
Académicos	5–2	Pumas Naucalpan	1–2	4–0

===== First leg =====
14 November 2012	C.U. Fútbol	0–3	Titanes de Tulancingo	San Agustín Tlaxiaca
11:00		Report	Villeda 55'; Bautista 88'; Mercado 90+2'	Stadium: Universidad del Fútbol – Cancha 3 Attendance: 200; Referee: Víctor Alfonso Cáceres Hernández

14 November 2012	Colegio Once México	1–0	Cachorros UANL	Zapopan
12:00	Pacas 90+3'	Report		Stadium: Colegio Once México; Attendance: 400; Referee: Luis Miguel Tapia González

14 November 2012	Calor de San Pedro	0–5	Alacranes de Durango	San Pedro
12:00		Report	Cardosa 8'; Sias 46', 64'; Delfín 61'; Camacho 68'	Stadium: Unidad Deportiva Benito Juárez; Attendance: 150; Referee: Carlos Manuel Mata Infante

14 November 2012	La Piedad	1–1	América Coapa	Silao
16:00	Godínez 78'	Report	Camarena 7'	Stadium: Estadio Municipal de Silao; Attendance: 200; Referee: Christian Adrián Ramírez Tejeda

14 November 2012	Necaxa	1–1	Cañoneros de Campeche	Aguascalientes City
16:00	Ríos 18'	Report	Frausto 80'	Stadium: Estadio Victoria; Attendance: 400; Referee: César Alfredo Venegas García

15 November 2012	Pumas Naucalpan	2–1	Académicos de Atlas	Mexico City
12:00	Hernández 8'; Martínez 14'	Report	Gaspar 64'	Stadium: Instalaciones de La Cantera; Attendance: 100; Referee: Luis Alberto Mattern García

15 November 2012	Pioneros de Cancún	1–0	Garzas UAEH	Cancún
19:00	Domínguez 54'	Report		Stadium: Estadio Andrés Quintana Roo; Attendance: 1,350; Referee: Rodolfo Jair Villanueva Pérez

15 November 2012	Atlético Chiapas	1–1	Zacatepec 1948	Tuxtla Gutiérrez
20:30	Piñón 44'	Report	Peralta 84'	Stadium: Estadio Víctor Manuel Reyna; Attendance: 800; Referee: Carlos Javier Ríos García

===== Second leg =====
17 November 2011	América Coapa	5–2 (6–3 agg.)	La Piedad	Mexico City
11:00	García 1' (own); Llergo 5'; Sánchez 63'; Hernández 76'; Aguilar 90+2'	Report	Ruiz 54'; González 61'	Stadium: Instalaciones Club América – Cancha 2 Attendance: 150; Referee: José Juan Contreras García

17 November 2011	Cachorros UANL	2–1 (2–2 agg.)	Colegio Once México	General Zuazua
11:15	Castañeda 10'; Chávez 90'	Report	Gómez 43'	Stadium: Instalaciones de Zuazua; Attendance: 50; Referee: Dennis Celerino Zaleta Cortéz

17 November 2011	Titanes de Tulancingo	1–0 (4–0 agg.)	C.U. Fútbol	Tulancingo
15:00	Villeda 28'	Report		Stadium: Estadio Primero de Mayo; Attendance: 200; Referee: Michel Caballero Galicia

17 November 2012	Cañoneros de Campeche	1–0 (2–1 agg.)	Necaxa	Campeche City
15:00	García 34'	Report		Stadium: Estadio Universitario de Campeche; Attendance: 1,000; Referee: César Magdiel Ruíz Magariño

17 November 2012	Alacranes de Durango	6–1 (11–1 agg.)	Calor de San Pedro	Durango City
15:00	Hernández 23', 44', 51', 66'; Mora 74'; Baca 90+2'	Report	Martínez 11'	Stadium: Estadio Francisco Zarco; Attendance: 350; Referee: Omar Antonio Fernández Martínez

18 November 2012	Académicos de Atlas	4–0 (5–2 agg.)	Pumas Naucalpan	Zapopan
11:00	Delgadillo 22', 54', 75'; Nava 86'	Report		Stadium: Club Atlas Chapalita; Attendance: 300; Referee: José Luis Muñóz Pantoja

18 November 2012	Garzas UAEH	2–1 (2–2 agg.)	Pioneros de Cancún	Pachuca
12:00	Ochoa 2'; Bustos 9'	Report	Gaspar 33'	Stadium: Club Hidalguense; Attendance: 100; Referee: Michel Ricardo Espinoza Ávalos

18 November 2012	Zacatepec 1948	1–1 (2–2 agg.)	Atlético Chiapas	Zacatepec
15:30	Pastrana 69'	Report	Aguirre 39'	Stadium: Estadio Agustín "Coruco" Díaz; Attendance: 2,500; Referee: Jovanni Gabriel Zúñiga Martínez

==== Quarter-finals ====
Team 1	Agg.	Team 2	1st leg	2nd leg
Titanes de Tulancingo	3–4	Zacatepec 1948	3–3	0–1
Cachorros UANL	1–6	Garzas UAEH	0–5	1–1
América Coapa	3–1	Cañoneros de Campeche	0–1	3–0
Alacranes de Durango	1–3	Académicos de Atlas	1–1	0–2

===== First leg =====
21 November 2012	Académicos de Atlas	1–1	Alacranes de Durango	Zapopan
11:00	Figueroa 7'	Report	Hernández 33'	Stadium: Club Atlas Chapalita; Attendance: 300; Referee: Jonatan Mercado Figueroa

21 November 2012	Garzas UAEH	5–0	Cachorros UANL	Pachuca
12:00	Bustos 18', 74'; Pérez 24'; Jaimes 64'; Hernández 80'	Report		Stadium: Estadio Hidalgo; Attendance: 100; Referee: Óscar Mejía García

21 November 2012	Cañoneros de Campeche	1–0	América Coapa	Campeche City
15:00	Rivera 77'	Report		Stadium: Estadio Universitario de Campeche; Attendance: 500; Referee: Adrián Ignacio García Tut

21 November 2012	Zacatepec 1948	3–3	Titanes de Tulancingo	Zacatepec
15:00	Ramírez 3'; Rico 30'; Pastrana 76'	Report	Enríquez 13'; Gutiérrez 37'; Álvarez 82'	Stadium: Estadio Agustín "Coruco" Díaz; Attendance: 3,000; Referee: Alejandro Barrios Ramírez

===== Second leg =====
24 November 2011	América Coapa	3–0 (3–1 agg.)	Cañoneros de Campeche	Mexico City
11:00	Delgadillo 3'; Quintana 72', 76'	Report		Stadium: Instalaciones Club América – Cancha 2 Attendance: 500; Referee: César Alfredo Venegas García

24 November 2012	Cachorros UANL	1–1 (1–6 agg.)	Garzas UAEH	General Zuazua
11:15	Martínez 20'	Report	Bustos 23'	Stadium: Instalaciones de Zuazua; Attendance: 50; Referee: Humberto Sánchez Reyna

24 November 2012	Titanes de Tulancingo	0–1 (3–4 agg.)	Zacatepec 1948	Tulancingo
15:00		Report	Manzano 90'	Stadium: Estadio Primero de Mayo; Attendance: Ángel Flores Galicia; Referee: 800

24 November 2012	Alacranes de Durango	0–2 (1–3 agg.)	Académicos de Atlas	Durango City
15:00		Report	Celada 59'; Caballero 83'	Stadium: Estadio Francisco Zarco; Attendance: 400; Referee: Francisco Raúl Medina Parra

==== Semi-finals ====
Team 1	Agg.	Team 2	1st leg	2nd leg
Zacatepec 1948	3–4	Garzas UAEH	1–2	2–2
América Coapa	3–5	Académicos de Atlas	1–3	2–2

===== First leg =====
28 November 2012	Académicos de Atlas	3–1	América Coapa	Zapopan
11:00	Gaspar 18'; Delgadillo 38'; Sánchez 83'	Report	Sánchez 84'	Stadium: Club Atlas Chapalita; Attendance: 150; Referee: Omar Jaime Hernández

29 November 2012	Garzas UAEH	2–1	Zacatepec 1948	Pachuca
12:00	López 11'; Ochoa 62'	Report	Álvarez 6'	Stadium: Club Hidalguense; Attendance: 800; Referee: Mario Andrés Eliosa Torres

===== Second leg =====
1 December 2012	América Coapa	2–2 (3–5 agg.)	Académicos de Atlas	Mexico City
12:00	Figueroa 34' (own); Pérez 90'	Report	Caballero 11'; Delgadillo 69'	Stadium: Instalaciones Club América – Cancha 2 Attendance: 350; Referee: Antonio de Jesús Olalde Vázquez

2 December 2012	Zacatepec 1948	2–2 (3–4 agg.)	Garzas UAEH	Zacatepec
15:30	Pastrana 18', 44'	Report	Bustos 3', 49'	Stadium: Estadio Agustín "Coruco" Díaz; Attendance: 6,000; Referee: Ángel Flores Galicia

==== Final ====
Team 1	Agg.	Team 2	1st leg	2nd leg
Garzas UAEH	1–3	Académicos de Atlas	0–1	1–2

===== First leg =====
5 December 2012	Académicos de Atlas	1–0	Garzas UAEH	Zapopan
12:00	Celada 85'	Report		Stadium: Club Atlas Chapalita; Attendance: 400; Referee: Omar Jaime Hernández

===== Second leg =====
8 December 2012	Garzas UAEH	1–2 (1–3 agg.)	Académicos de Atlas	Pachuca
11:30	Ochoa 75'	Report	Sánchez 12'; Celada 47'	Stadium: Estadio Hidalgo; Attendance: 4,000; Referee: Ángel Flores Galicia

Apertura 2012 winners:

2nd title

== Torneo Clausura ==
=== Regular season ===
==== Group 1 ====
===== Standings =====
Pos	Team	Pld	W	D	L	GF	GA	GD	Pts	Qualification or relegation
1	Pioneros de Cancún	13	10	3	0	35	8	+27	33	Promotion Playoffs
2	Pumas Naucalpan	13	8	2	3	31	14	+17	26	Promotion Playoffs
3	Atlético Chiapas	13	7	3	3	25	12	+13	24	Promotion Playoffs
4	Zacatepec 1948	13	6	4	3	27	12	+15	22	Promotion Playoffs
5	Titanes de Tulancingo	13	5	5	3	20	11	+9	22	Promotion Playoffs
6	América Coapa	13	5	5	3	17	17	0	21	Promotion Playoffs
7	Garzas UAEH	13	5	4	4	19	19	0	20	Promotion Playoffs
8	Lobos Prepa	13	5	2	6	16	26	−10	17	Promotion Playoffs
9	Cañoneros de Campeche	13	4	3	6	16	17	−1	16	Promotion Playoffs
10	Cuautla	13	4	4	5	19	23	−4	16	
11	Centro Universitario del Fútbol	13	3	3	7	22	24	−2	13	
12	Deportivo Chimalhuacán	13	2	4	7	8	28	−20	10	
13	Bavaria Tultitlán	13	2	2	9	11	30	−19	8	
14	Atlante Tabasco	13	2	2	9	19	44	−25	8	

Source: Segunda División FMF

===== Results =====
Home \ Away	AME	ATB	ATC	BAV	CAM	CUF	CUA	CHI	LOB	PIO	PUM	TUL	UEH	ZAC
América Coapa	—	—	2–1	2–2	1–0	—	3–1	1–1	—	—	—	1–1	1–1	—
Atlante Tabasco	2–0	—	1–1	—	—	3–3	—	2–0	—	2–4	—	—	1–2	—
Atlético Chiapas	—	—	—	3–1	2–0	—	3–3	—	6–0	—	0–1	1–1	2–0	—
Bavaria Tultitlán	—	3–2	—	—	0–2	—	—	—	1–0	—	0–2	0–2	—	0–2
Cañoneros de Campeche	—	3–1	—	—	—	2–0	—	—	1–1	0–3	1–3	—	—	0–2
C.U. Fútbol	1–1	—	1–2	4–1	—	—	—	5–0	—	—	—	1–1	2–3	—
Cuautla	—	2–1	—	4–0	0–4	0–2	—	—	—	1–1	—	0–1	—	—
Dep. Chimalhuacán	—	—	1–2	2–1	2–2	—	0–1	—	—	—	0–4	1–0	0–4	—
Lobos Prepa	1–2	3–2	—	—	—	1–0	3–1	3–0	—	1–1	—	—	—	0–6
Pioneros	4–0	—	1–0	3–0	—	3–0	—	3–0	—	—	—	—	4–0	—
Pumas Naucalpan	1–0	9–2	—	—	—	2–1	2–3	—	3–0	0–2	—	—	—	1–1
Tulancingo	—	7–0	—	—	1–0	—	—	—	0–1	3–3	2–2	—	—	0–1
Garzas UAEH	—	—	—	2–2	1–1	—	1–2	—	2–1	—	2–1	0–1	—	1–1
Zacatepec 1948	1–3	7–0	0–2	—	—	4–1	1–1	0–0	—	1–3	—	—	—	—

Source: Segunda División FMF
Legend: Blue = home team win; Yellow = draw; Red = away team win.

==== Group 2 ====
===== Standings =====
Pos	Team	Pld	W	D	L	GF	GA	GD	Pts	Qualification or relegation
1	Académicos de Atlas	11	7	1	3	25	8	+17	22	Promotion Playoffs
2	Santos Los Mochis	11	6	3	2	20	12	+8	22	Promotion Playoffs
3	Alacranes de Durango	11	6	3	2	21	8	+13	21	Promotion Playoffs
4	Necaxa "B"	11	5	5	1	20	10	+10	20	Promotion Playoffs
5	Colegio Once México	11	5	3	3	18	16	+2	19	Promotion Playoffs
6	Topos de Reynosa	11	6	1	4	14	16	−2	19	Promotion Playoffs
7	Tuzos UAZ	11	5	1	5	15	16	−1	17	Promotion Playoffs
8	Cachorros UANL	11	4	2	5	12	16	−4	14	
9	Calor de San Pedro	11	4	1	6	10	20	−10	14	
10	Oro	11	3	1	7	14	20	−6	10	
11	Irapuato "B"	11	2	2	7	16	25	−9	8	
12	La Piedad "B"	11	1	1	9	10	28	−18	4	

Source: Segunda División FMF

===== Results =====
Home \ Away	ACA	ALD	CAC	CAL	COM	IRA	LPD	NEC	ORO	SLM	TOP	UAZ
Académicos	—	—	4–0	—	—	4–1	4–0	—	2–1	—	6–0	1–0
Alacranes	1–0	—	—	4–0	—	—	—	—	2–0	1–1	2–0	—
Cachorros UANL	—	1–0	—	1–0	1–1	—	3–0	0–1	—	2–2	—	—
Calor de San Pedro	0–1	—	—	—	—	1–2	—	—	2–1	—	—	2–0
Colegio Once México	2–1	1–4	—	2–0	—	—	3–2	—	—	1–0	1–1	—
Irapuato	—	0–0	2–3	—	2–2	—	—	1–3	—	1–4	—	—
La Piedad	—	2–5	—	1–2	—	2–1	—	—	—	2–3	—	0–2
Necaxa	1–1	1–1	—	7–1	2–1	—	0–0	—	—	1–0	—	—
Oro	—	—	4–1	—	2–4	0–3	2–0	0–0	—	—	—	3–2
Santos Los Mochis	2–1	—	—	0–0	—	—	—	—	3–1	—	2–1	2–1
Topos	—	—	1–0	1–2	—	3–1	2–1	2–1	1–0	—	—	2–0
Tuzos UAZ	—	2–1	1–0	—	1–0	3–2	—	3–3	—	—	—	—

Source: Segunda División FMF
Legend: Blue = home team win; Yellow = draw; Red = away team win.

=== Liguilla ===
The nine and seven best teams of each group play two games against each other on a home-and-away basis. The higher seeded teams play on their home field during the second leg. The winner of each match up is determined by aggregate score. In the round of 16, quarterfinals and semifinals, if the two teams are tied on aggregate the higher seeded team advances. In the final, if the two teams are tied after both legs, the match goes to extra time and, if necessary, a penalty shoot-out.

Round of 8
1	Pioneros	3	3	6
15	Lobos Prepa	0	0	0
10	Necaxa	0	1	1
12	Colegio Once México	0	0	0
2	Pumas Naucalpan	1	3	4
15	Cañoneros	3	0	3
5	Zacatepec 1948	1	3	4
6	Tulancingo	1	1	2
7	Santos Los Mochis (s.)	1	1	2
11	Garzas UAEH	1	1	2
3	Atlético Chiapas	1	3	4
13	Topos de Reynosa	0	0	0
9	Alacranes	1	1	2
14	Tuzos UAZ	1	1	2
4	Académicos	1	4	5
8	América Coapa	1	2	3

Quarter-finals
1	Pioneros	0	3	3
10	Necaxa	0	2	2
2	Pumas Naucalpan	2	3	5
5	Zacatepec 1948	6	2	8
7	Santos Los Mochis	2	2	4
3	Atlético Chiapas	1	2	3
9	Alacranes	2	1	3
4	Académicos	0	1	1

Semi-finals
1	Pioneros (s.)	0	0	0
5	Zacatepec 1948	0	0	0
7	Santos Los Mochis	0	1	1
9	Alacranes	2	0	2

Final
1	Pioneros	0	1	1
9	Alacranes	3	0	3

==== Round of 8 ====
Team 1	Agg.	Team 2	1st leg	2nd leg
Pioneros de Cancún	6–0	Lobos Prepa	3–0	3–0
Necaxa	1–0	Colegio Once México	0–0	1–0
Pumas Naucalpan	4–3	Cañoneros de Campeche	1–3	3–0
Zacatepec 1948	4–2	Titanes de Tulancingo	1–1	3–1
Santos Los Mochis (s.)	2–2	Garzas UAEH	1–1	1–1
Atlético Chiapas	4–0	Topos de Reynosa	1–0	3–0
Alacranes de Durango (s.)	2–2	Tuzos UAZ	1–1	1–1
Académicos de Atlas	5–3	América Coapa	1–1	4–2

===== First leg =====
17 April 2013	Topos de Reynosa	0–1	Atlético Chiapas	Reynosa
10:00		Report	Aguirre 49'	Stadium: Unidad Deportiva Solidaridad; Attendance: 100; Referee: Alejandro Funk Villafañe

17 April 2013	Colegio Once México	0–0	Necaxa	Zapopan
11:00		Report		Stadium: Colegio Once México; Attendance: 500; Referee: Luis Miguel Tapia González

17 April 2013	Lobos Prepa	0–3	Pioneros de Cancún	Puebla City
12:00		Report	Gaspar 9'; Navarro 14'; Zurita 39'	Stadium: Ciudad Universitaria Puebla; Attendance: 100; Referee: Alejandro Barrios Ramírez

17 April 2013	Garzas UAEH	1–1	Santos Los Mochis	Mineral de la Reforma
12:00	Parra 62'	Report	Castillo 32'	Stadium: Estadio Nuevo La Higa; Attendance: 100; Referee: Mario Andrés Eliosa Torres

17 April 2013	Cañoneros de Campeche	3–1	Pumas Naucalpan	Campeche City
16:00	Guzmán 4'; Frausto 42'; Echeverría 90+2'	Report	Rebollo 11'	Stadium: Estadio Universitario de Campeche; Attendance: 400; Referee: Roger Alemán Solís

17 April 2013	Tuzos UAZ	1–1	Alacranes de Durango	Zacatecas City
20:15	Cervantes 79'	Report	Hernández 6'	Stadium: Estadio Universitario Unidad Deportiva Norte; Attendance: 400; Referee: Aldo Cano Martínez

18 April 2013	América Coapa	1–1	Académicos de Atlas	Mexico City
11:45	Camarena 35'	Report	Hernández 40'	Stadium: Instalaciones Club América – Cancha 2 Attendance: 100; Referee: Dennis Celerino Zaleta Cortés

18 April 2013	Titanes de Tulancingo	1–1	Zacatepec 1948	Tulancingo
16:00	Martínez 3'	Report	Pastrana 85'	Stadium: Estadio Primero de Mayo; Attendance: 200; Referee: Omar Jaime Hernández

===== Second leg =====
20 April 2013	Pumas Naucalpan	3–0 (4–3 agg.)	Cañoneros de Campeche	Mexico City
10:00	Alavez 16'; Hernández 30', 50'	Report		Stadium: Instalaciones de La Cantera; Attendance: 250; Referee: Miguel Ángel Moreno Zamora

20 April 2013	Necaxa	1–0 (1–0 agg.)	Colegio Once México	Aguascalientes City
11:00	Ríos 22'	Report		Stadium: Estadio Victoria; Attendance: 200; Referee: Edgardo Espejo Tello

20 April 2013	Pioneros de Cancún	3–0 (6–0 agg.)	Lobos Prepa	Cancún
16:00	Echeverría 13', 77'; Hurtado 82'	Report		Stadium: Estadio Cancún 86; Attendance: 650; Referee: Carlos Javier Ríos García

20 April 2013	Alacranes de Durango	1–1 (2–2 agg.)	Tuzos UAZ	Durango City
17:00	Camacho 41'	Report	Ortega 81'	Stadium: Estadio Francisco Zarco; Attendance: 350; Referee: Mario Humberto Vargas Mata

20 April 2013	Santos Los Mochis	1–1 (2–2 agg.)	Garzas UAEH	Los Mochis
19:00	Medina 64'	Report	Ruiz 75' (own)	Stadium: Estadio Centenario; Attendance: 500; Referee: José Luis Luna Ramírez

20 April 2013	Atlético Chiapas	3–0 (4–0 agg.)	Topos de Reynosa	Tuxtla Gutiérrez
19:30	Piñón 21'; Aguirre 55'; Cordero 83'	Report		Stadium: Estadio Víctor Manuel Reyna; Attendance: 1,300; Referee: Luis Alberto Mattern García

21 April 2013	Académicos de Atlas	4–2 (5–3 agg.)	América Coapa	Zapopan
12:00	Barragán 63', 75', 80'; Delgadillo 89'	Report	Hernández 7'; Esquivel 29'	Stadium: Estadio Alfredo "Pistache" Torres; Attendance: 200; Referee: Antonio de Jesús Olalde Vázquez

21 April 2013	Zacatepec 1948	3–1 (4–2 agg.)	Titanes de Tulancingo	Xochitepec
16:00	Menes 60', 90+1'; Pastrana 74'	Report	Meza 10'	Stadium: Estadio Mariano Matamoros; Attendance: 1,500; Referee: Ángel Flores Galicia

==== Quarter-finals ====
Team 1	Agg.	Team 2	1st leg	2nd leg
Pioneros de Cancún	3–2	Necaxa	0–0	3–2
Pumas Naucalpan	5–8	Zacatepec 1948	2–6	3–2
Santos Los Mochis	4–3	Atlético Chiapas	2–2	1–2
Alacranes de Durango	3–1	Académicos de Atlas	2–0	1–1

===== First leg =====
24 April 2013	Necaxa	0–0	Pioneros de Cancún	Aguascalientes City
10:00		Report		Stadium: Instalaciones Club Necaxa; Attendance: 200; Referee: Humberto Sánchez Reyna

24 April 2013	Académicos de Atlas	0–2	Alacranes de Durango	Zapopan
11:00		Report	Flores 50'; Camacho 85'	Stadium: Estadio Alfredo "Pistache" Torres; Attendance: 100; Referee: Edgardo Espejo Tello

24 April 2013	Zacatepec 1948	6–2	Pumas Naucalpan	Xochitepec
16:00	Pastrana 31', 68'; Menes 54', 90+2'; López 85'; Hernández 87'	Report	Popoca 20'; Gutiérrez 53'	Stadium: Estadio Mariano Matamoros; Attendance: 500; Referee: José Juan Contreras García

24 April 2013	Atlético Chiapas	1–2	Santos Los Mochis	Tuxtla Gutiérrez
20:00	Piñón 44'	Report	Castillo 39', 66'	Stadium: Estadio Víctor Manuel Reyna; Attendance: 3,300; Referee: Carlos Javier Ríos García

===== Second leg =====
27 April 2013	Pumas Naucalpan	3–2 (5–8 agg.)	Zacatepec 1948	Mexico City
10:00	Gutiérrez 7'; Martínez 8'; Rodríguez 47'	Report	López 22'; Pastrana 84'	Stadium: Instalaciones de La Cantera; Attendance: 0 Referee: Dennis Celerino Zaleta Cortés

27 April 2013	Pioneros de Cancún	3–2 (3–2 agg.)	Necaxa	Cancún
16:00	Torres 54'; Echeverría 62'; Zurita 66'	Report	López 15', 84'	Stadium: Estadio Cancún 86; Attendance: 4,100; Referee: Gilberto Alvarado Farjat

27 April 2013	Alacranes de Durango	1–1 (3–1 agg.)	Académicos de Atlas	Durango City
17:00	Hernández 88'	Report	Barragán 80'	Stadium: Estadio Francisco Zarco; Attendance: 600; Referee: Omar Antonio Fernández Martínez

27 April 2013	Santos Los Mochis	2–2 (4–3 agg.)	Atlético Chiapas	Los Mochis
19:00	Castillo 5'; Cinco 90+2'	Report	Díaz 12'; Torres 70'	Stadium: Estadio Centenario; Attendance: 750; Referee: Luis Miguel Tapia González

==== Semi-finals ====
Team 1	Agg.	Team 2	1st leg	2nd leg
Pioneros de Cancún (s.)	0–0	Zacatepec 1948	0–0	0–0
Santos Los Mochis	1–2	Alacranes de Durango	0–2	1–0

===== First leg =====
1 May 2013	Zacatepec 1948	0–0	Pioneros de Cancún	Xochitepec
16:00		Report		Stadium: Estadio Mariano Matamoros; Attendance: 1,000; Referee: Michel Ricardo Espinoza Ávalos

1 May 2013	Alacranes de Durango	2–0	Santos Los Mochis	Durango City
17:00	Hernández 8', 25'	Report		Stadium: Estadio Francisco Zarco; Attendance: 1,200; Referee: Omar Arturo Orpinel Lucero

===== Second leg =====
4 May 2013	Pioneros de Cancún	0–0 (0–0 agg.)	Zacatepec 1948	Cancún
16:00		Report		Stadium: Estadio Cancún 86; Attendance: 5,800; Referee: Roger Alemán Solís

4 May 2013	Santos Los Mochis	1–0 (1–2 agg.)	Alacranes de Durango	Los Mochis
19:00	Cinco 79'	Report		Stadium: Estadio Centenario; Attendance: 3,000; Referee: Jesús Leopoldo Guerrero García

==== Final ====
Team 1	Agg.	Team 2	1st leg	2nd leg
Pioneros de Cancún	1–3	Alacranes de Durango	0–3	1–0

===== First leg =====
8 May 2013	Alacranes de Durango	3–0	Pioneros de Cancún	Durango City
17:00	Hernández 5', 16', 67'	Report		Stadium: Estadio Francisco Zarco; Attendance: 3,500; Referee: Alejandro Funk Villafañe

===== Second leg =====
11 May 2013	Pioneros de Cancún	1–0 (1–3 agg.)	Alacranes de Durango	Cancún
19:00	Terán 90+5'	Report		Stadium: Estadio Andrés Quintana Roo; Attendance: 7,000; Referee: Carlos Javier Ríos García

Clausura 2013 winners:

1st title

== Relegation Table ==
P	Team	Pts	G	Pts/G
1	Alacranes de Durango	46	22	2.090
2	Pioneros de Cancún	54	26	2.077
3	América Coapa	50	26	1.923
4	Académicos de Atlas	42	22	1.909
5	Necaxa "B"	42	22	1.909
6	Titanes de Tulancingo	49	26	1.885
7	Pumas Naucalpan	48	26	1.846
8	Zacatepec 1948	48	26	1.846
9	Atlético Chiapas	46	26	1.769
10	Cachorros UANL	38	22	1.727
11	Garzas UAEH	44	26	1.6923
12	Colegio Once México	35	22	1.591
13	Santos Los Mochis	32	22	1.456
14	Tuzos UAZ	31	22	1.409
15	Cañoneros de Campeche	35	26	1.346
16	Calor de San Pedro	29	22	1.318
17	Centro Universitario del Fútbol	31	26	1.192
18	Lobos Prepa	31	26	1.192
19	Oro	25	22	1.136
20	Topos de Reynosa	23	22	1.045
21	Cuautla	27	26	1.0384
22	Deportivo Chimalhuacán	24	26	0.923
23	La Piedad "B"	19	22	0.863
24	Irapuato "B"	18	22	0.818
25	Atlante Tabasco	19	26	0.730
26	Bavaria Tultitlán	9	26	0.346

Last updated: 13 April 2013
Source: Liga Premier FMF
P = Position; G = Games played; Pts = Points; Pts/G = Ratio of points to games played

== Promotion Final ==
The Final de Ascenso de la Liga de Nuevos Talentos 2013 was the promotion final between the champions of the Apertura 2012 and Clausura 2013 tournaments to determine the club promoted to Liga Premier de Ascenso. The first leg was played on 15 May 2013, and the second leg was played on 18 May 2013.

Team 1	Agg.	Team 2	1st leg	2nd leg
Alacranes de Durango	2–4	Académicos	2–4	0–0

=== First leg ===
15 May 2013	Académicos	4–2	Alacranes de Durango	Guadalajara
17:00	Díaz 40'; Martínez 53'; Barragán 59'; Reyes 71'	Report	Hernández 10', 88'	Stadium: Estadio Jalisco; Attendance: 900; Referee: Reinhold Enrique Ortiz Tienda

=== Second leg ===
18 May 2013	Alacranes de Durango	0–0 (2–4 agg.)	Académicos	Durango City
20:00		Report		Stadium: Estadio Francisco Zarco; Attendance: 8,000; Referee: Humberto Sánchez Reyna

2012–13 season winners

2nd title

== See also ==
- 2012–13 Liga MX season
- 2012–13 Ascenso MX season
- 2012–13 Liga Premier de Ascenso season
