= Fernando Monárrez =

Mexican footballer (born 1999)

Personal information
- Full name: Fernando Monárrez Ochoa
- Date of birth: 22 July 1999 (age 27)
- Place of birth: Sinaloa de Leyva, Sinaloa, Mexico
- Height: 1.72 m (5 ft 8 in)
- Position: Attacking midfielder

Team information
- Current team: Puebla (on loan from Tijuana)
- Number: 7

Youth career
- 2014: Chiapas
- 2017–2019: Guadalajara

Senior career*
| Years | Team | Apps | (Gls) |
| 2018–2019 | Guadalajara | 0 | (0) |
| 2019–2020 | Salamanca | 14 | (0) |
| 2020–2021 | Tlaxcala | 0 | (0) |
| 2021–2022 | Mazorqueros | 32 | (9) |
| 2022 | Atlético La Paz | 13 | (2) |
| 2023 | Chihuahua | 13 | (0) |
| 2023–2024 | Sonora | 29 | (7) |
| 2024– | Tijuana | 6 | (0) |
| 2025– | → Puebla (loan) | 41 | (2) |
- * Club domestic league appearances and goals as of 20 November 2026

Fernando Monárrez Ochoa (born 22 July 1999) is a Mexican professional footballer who plays as an attacking midfielder for Liga MX side Puebla, on loan from Tijuana.

== Career ==
In 2020, Monárrez started his career in Tlaxcala. In 2022, he was transferred to Atlético La Paz . In 2023, he joined Sonora. In 2024, he signed with Tijuana. In 2025, he was loaned to Puebla.

== Career statistics ==
=== Club ===
As of match played on 20 November 2026

Appearances and goals by club, season and competition
| Club | Season | League | | | Cup | | Continental | | Other | | Total | |
| Club | Season | Division | Apps | Goals | Apps | Goals | Apps | Goals | Apps | Goals | Apps | Goals |
|---|---|---|---|---|---|---|---|---|---|---|---|---|
| Guadalajara | 2018–19 | Liga MX | — | | 3 | 0 | — | | — | | 3 | 0 |
| Salamanca | 2019–20 | Segunda Federación | 9 | 0 | — | | — | | — | | 9 | 0 |
| Salamanca | 2020–21 | Segunda Federación | 5 | 0 | 1 | 0 | — | | — | | 6 | 0 |
| Salamanca | Total | | 14 | 0 | 1 | 0 | — | | — | | 15 | 0 |
| Mazorqueros | 2021–22 | Liga Premier de México | 32 | 9 | — | | — | | — | | 32 | 9 |
| Atlético La Paz | 2022–23 | Liga de Expansión MX | 13 | 2 | — | | — | | — | | 13 | 2 |
| Chihuahua | 2022–23 | Liga Premier de México | 13 | 0 | — | | — | | — | | 13 | 0 |
| Sonora | 2023–24 | Liga de Expansión MX | 29 | 7 | — | | — | | — | | 29 | 7 |
| Tijuana | 2024–25 | Liga MX | 6 | 0 | — | | — | | — | | 6 | 0 |
| Puebla (loan) | 2025–26 | Liga MX | 24 | 1 | — | | — | | 3 (Note: Appearances in Leagues Cup) | 0 | 27 | 1 |
| Puebla (loan) | 2026–27 | Liga MX | 17 | 1 | — | | — | | 2 | 0 | 19 | 1 |
| Puebla (loan) | Total | | 41 | 2 | — | | — | | 5 | 0 | 46 | 2 |
| Career total | | | 148 | 20 | 4 | 0 | 0 | 0 | 5 | 0 | 157 | 20 |
