= Andy García (soccer) =

American soccer player (born 1995)

Personal information
- Full name: Andy Arnold García Sandoval
- Date of birth: August 9, 1996 (age 30)
- Place of birth: Las Cruces, New Mexico, U.S.
- Height: 1.70 m (5 ft 7 in)
- Position: Midfielder

Team information
- Current team: Durango
- Number: 2

Senior career*
| Years | Team | Apps | (Gls) |
| 2014 | UACH | | |
| 2015–2018 | Toluca | 0 | (0) |
| 2017–2018 | Toluca Premier | 17 | (0) |
| 2018 | Real Zamora | 14 | (1) |
| 2019 | La Piedad | 13 | (0) |
| 2019–2022 | Durango | 55 | (6) |
| 2022–2023 | Chihuahua | 17 | (1) |
| 2026– | Durango | 1 | (0) |
- * Club domestic league appearances and goals as of 14:39, July 25, 2026 (UTC)

Andy Arnold García Sandoval (born August 1, 1995) is an American soccer player who currently plays as a midfielder for Liga de Expansión MX club Durango.

== Career ==
García spent the 2014 season with UACH F.C. before joining Deportivo Toluca, where he made his debut in a Copa MX match on 14 February 2017. He won the Serie A de México title with Alacranes de Durango during the Clausura 2022 season. In June 2022, García signed with new club Chihuahua F.C.

== Career statistics ==
=== Club ===
As of March 15, 2021

| Club | Season | League | | | National cup | | Continental | | Other | | Total | |
| Club | Season | Division | Apps | Goals | Apps | Goals | Apps | Goals | Apps | Goals | Apps | Goals |
|---|---|---|---|---|---|---|---|---|---|---|---|---|
| Deportivo Toluca Premier | 2016–17 | Liga MX | 0 | 0 | 1 (Note: Appearance(s) in the Copa MX) | 1 | 0 | 0 | 0 | 0 | 1 | 1 |
| Deportivo Toluca Premier | 2017–18 | Liga MX | 0 | 0 | 2 | 0 | 0 | 0 | 0 | 0 | 2 | 0 |
| Deportivo Toluca Premier | 2018–19 | Liga MX | 0 | 0 | 0 | 0 | – | | 0 | 0 | 0 | 0 |
| Deportivo Toluca Premier | Total | | 0 | 0 | 3 | 1 | 0 | 0 | 0 | 0 | 3 | 1 |
| Deportivo Toluca | 2017–18 | Liga Premier - Serie A | 11 | 0 | – | | – | | 0 | 0 | 11 | 0 |
| Deportivo Toluca | 2018–19 | Liga Premier - Serie A | 6 | 0 | – | | – | | 0 | 0 | 6 | 0 |
| Deportivo Toluca | Total | | 17 | 0 | 0 | 0 | 0 | 0 | 0 | 0 | 17 | 0 |
| Real Zamora (loan) | 2018–19 | Liga Premier - Serie A | 14 | 1 | 0 | 0 | – | | 0 | 0 | 14 | 1 |
| Reboceros de La Piedad (loan) | 2018–19 | Liga Premier - Serie A | 13 | 0 | 0 | 0 | – | | 0 | 0 | 13 | 0 |
| Durango (loan) | 2019–20 | Liga Premier - Serie A | 22 | 1 | 0 | 0 | – | | 0 | 0 | 22 | 1 |
| Durango (loan) | 2020–21 | Liga Premier - Serie A | 16 | 1 | 0 | 0 | – | | 0 | 0 | 16 | 1 |
| Career total | | | 82 | 3 | 3 | 1 | 0 | 0 | 0 | 0 | 82 | 4 |

== Honors ==
=== Club ===
Alacranes de Durango

- Serie A de México: Clausura 2022
