= Ricardo Jiménez (footballer, born 1984) =

Mexican footballer (born 1984)

Personal information
- Full name: Ricardo Adán Jiménez de Alba
- Date of birth: 17 November 1984 (age 41)
- Place of birth: Guadalajara, Mexico
- Height: 1.86 m (6 ft 1 in)
- Position: Centre back

Team information
- Current team: Tritones Vallarta (manager)

Senior career*
Years	Team	Apps	(Gls)
2005–2006	Chiapas	1	(0)
2006–2011	Atlas	74	(3)
2012–2015	Atlante	24	(0)
2013	→ San Luis (loan)	8	(1)

Managerial career
- 2019–2020: CAFESSA Jalisco (Assistant)
- 2020–2022: Mazorqueros (Assistant)
- 2022–2023: La Paz (Assistant)
- 2024–2025: UdeG Premier
- 2025: Tigres de Álica
- 2026–: Tritones Vallarta
- * Club domestic league appearances and goals as of 6 August 2013

Ricardo Adán Jiménez de Alba (born 17 November 1984) is a former Mexican professional footballer and current manager who last played for Atlante in the Ascenso MX. Since December 2025 is the manager of Mexican club Tritones Vallarta.
