= Diego Gama =

Diego Gama may refer to:

- Diego Gama de Oliveira (born 1983) Brazilian footballer
- Diego Alberto Gama García (born 1996) Mexican footballer
