= Abraham Bass =

Abraham Bass may refer to:

- Abraham Bass (cricketer) (1804–1882), English cricketer
- Abraham Bass (footballer) (born 2001), Mexican footballer
