= Alacranes de Durango =

- Full name: Club de Fútbol Alacranes de Durango
- Nicknames: Los Alacranes (The Scorpions); Los Albiverdes (The White-and-Greens); Los Ponzoñosos (The Poisonous)
- Founded: January 12, 1997; 29 years ago (as Camineros de Durango)
- Stadium: Estadio Francisco Zarco
- Capacity: 18,000
- Owner: Centro de Formación Deportiva Alacranes de Durango AC
- President: Ciro Castillo Ibarra
- Manager: Héctor Jair Real
- League: Liga de Expansión MX
- Apertura 2026: Regular phase: 7th of 16; Final phase: Quarter-finals
Home colours	Away colours

Club de Fútbol Alacranes de Durango is a professional football club based in Durango. The club competes in Liga de Expansión MX, the second level of Mexican football, and plays its home matches at Estadio Francisco Zarco. Founded in 1997 as Camineros de Durango, and adopted its current name at the end of that same year. The club's colors are green, white and black.

Alacranes de Durango's debut in FMF competitions was in the Invierno 1997 tournament of the Segunda División and finishing as runners-up. The club has participated in leagues at the lower levels of Mexican football.

== History ==
=== Foundation ===
The need for a true professional sporting team, after the recent failures of basketball in the twilight of duranguense CIMEBA, prompted the state government to acquire through an application, the franchise of the now defunct Serpientes de Cancún (Cancun Serpents).

Once the league application was approved and the Serpientes de Cancún team was moved to Durango, Durango, the city of Durango returned to professional football after an absence of eight years. During the Torneo Invierno 1997, Durango were as champions of the Zona Norte (North Region) and national runners-up after falling to Monarcas Zitacuaro for an aggregate score of 3–1.

At the time, head coach Mario "Pichojos" Pérez who played in the 1970 FIFA World Cup, rethought the tactics and had another excellent season in the Torneo Verano 1998, before losing in the final of the Zona Norte (North Region) to Aguascalientes, who won the national final against Monarcas Zitácuaro resulting in their promotion.

=== Mario "Pichojos" Pérez & José Vázquez Era ===
During the Torneo Invierno 1998 and Verano 1999 of the Second Division of Mexican Football, Durango was managed by Mario "Pichojos" Pérez and José Vázquez. Competing under the name Camineros de Durango, the team reached two national championship finals. They defeated Monarcas de Zitácuaro 1–0 in the Torneo Invierno 98 and Potros Marte 4–3 in the Torneo Verano 99.

The starting XI that earned promotion for of was:

Goalkeeper	Defenders	Midfielders	Forwards
(Mexico) Rogelio Rodríguez	Victor Hugo Bermúdez	Luis Alberto "Gallo" Gaytán (captain)	Francisco "Guancha" de la Cruz
	Jair Santillán	(Mexico) Jaime "Huevo" Sosa	André Basilio (Brasil)
	(Mexico) Bogar Lizárraga	Rivelino Robles	
	Esteban Mejía	Mauricio Cerecero	

=== Joining the Primera A ===
Once Durango gained promotion into the Primera A, their name changed from Camineros de Durango to Alacranes de Durango. The departure of Mario "Pichojos" Pérez and José Vázquez was forced by the separation of the directors of the club.

In their first season in the Primera "A", Alacranes de Durango was led by Guillermo "Campeón" Hernández, a coach who performed well after accepting the role with the club in 20th place overall and leaving Durango in 18th place and in fourteenth in the percentage table.

Alacranes failed to qualify for the playoffs in both the Torneos Invierno 99 and Verano 2000 in the Primera División A. The state government decided to bring order to the professional sport and determined to avoid expenditures of professional basketball and professional baseball to devote their full support to José Velasco Najar and his board of directors, who came to replace the leaving group from the Torneo Invierno 2000. The reaction was swift, Velasco Najar, brought together valuable duranguenses, talented local entrepreneurs and ensured the best decisions on the sporting side.

The recruitment of figures such as a head coach Juan de Dios Castillo and his coaching staff, players such as Gabriel García, a Mexican player with World Cup experience, champion of the Primera División de México, Luis Felipe Peña, whose prestige was formed as a defender for big teams like Club América itself, four young Brazilians who sought a place in Mexican football and an Argentine footballer would come to occupy the goal tending position in Durango.

Goalkeeper	Defenders	Midfielders	Forwards
(Argentina) Fernando Oillateguerre	(Mexico) Arturo Sosa	(Mexico) Ramón Villaceballos	(Mexico) Gabriel García
	(Mexico) Luis Felipe Peña	(Mexico) Jaime "Huevo" Sosa	(Brazil) Williams de Oliveira
	(Mexico) Bogar Lizárraga	(Brazil) Christian Peixoto	
	(Mexico) Adrían Granados	(Mexico) Guillermo López	

In May 2011 the team stopped participating in Liga de Ascenso (formerly Primera 'A') due to financial problems, however, the team continued to exist as the reserves that participated in the Liga de Nuevos Talentos became the main team.

=== Renaissance in Segunda División ===
The team began its new stage with a squad made up mainly of young players who had been trained at the club. In May 2013, the team won the Torneo Clausura, for which it won the right to play in the play-off for promotion to the Liga Premier de Ascenso (third level of Mexican soccer). In the series Durango was defeated by Académicos de Atlas, however, because Académicos did not have the right to promote from the category, its place was occupied by Durango.

On 18 December 2021, the team won the Torneo Apertura 2021 of Serie A after defeating Inter Playa del Carmen with a global score of 1-0, thus ensuring their place in the play-off for promotion to the Liga de Expansión MX, new second level.

After winning the third title in this division, the team managed to equal the Mexican record for most games in a row without losing at home, adding 29 games undefeated in the Estadio Francisco Zarco for which Durango tied the record for the clubs Pachuca and Tigres UANL. On April 1, 2022, the team surpassed the established mark and became the Mexican club with the longest time undefeated at home by adding 30 games without losing at home.

=== Promotion to Liga de Expansión MX ===
On May 15, 2022 Durango won the Serie A season championship after defeating Mazorqueros F.C., Torneo Clausura 2022 champion, with an aggregate score of 2–5. After the Serie A victory, the team was considered as a participant in the certification process to aspire to a place in the Liga de Expansión MX, finally, on June 14, 2022, the club's promotion to the second category of Mexican soccer was confirmed. However, the team only remained for one season in the second–tier, on June 29, 2023 the team was dropped from the league due to having financial problems, also Durango only had the status of guest club and was not a full member of the League, so the club was subject to greater control of compliance with the obligations with respect to other clubs in the division. The team re-joined the Liga Premier – Serie A on July 18, 2023.

Three years after losing their place in the Liga de Expansión, on June 12, 2026, the team managed to return to the division after meeting the requirements requested by the league, since Deportiva Venados, 2025–26 champions and the team that had the preference to access the place in the league, did not obtain the certification to enter the second tier of Mexican football.

== Honours ==
Domestic
Type	Competition	Titles	Seasons	Runners-up
Lower levels FMF	Segunda División/Liga Premier	3	Inv–1998, Ver–1999, Ape–2021	Inv–1997, 2025–26
Lower levels FMF	Campeón de Campeones Segunda División/Liga Premier	2	1999, 2022	—
Lower levels FMF	Liga de Nuevos Talentos	1	Cla–2013	Ape–2009
Lower levels FMF	Campeón de Campeones Liga de Nuevos Talentos	0	—	2014

== Personnel ==
=== Management ===
Position	Staff
President	(Mexico) Ciro Castillo Ibarra
Director of football	(Mexico) Álvaro Briones

Source: Liga MX

=== Coaching staff ===
Position	Staff
Manager	(Mexico) Héctor Jair Real
Assistant manager	(Mexico) Gamaliel Durán
Fitness coach	(Mexico) Oscar Raya
Physiotherapists	(Mexico) Pedro Cordero
Team doctor	(Mexico) José Díaz

== Players ==
=== Current squad ===
As of 23 August 2026

Note: Flags indicate national team as defined under FIFA eligibility rules; some limited exceptions apply. Players may hold more than one non-FIFA nationality.

No.	Pos.	Nation	Player
1	GK	MEX	Jared Muñoz
2	DF	USA	Andy García
3	DF	MEX	Jesús González
4	DF	MEX	Osmar Múñoz
5	MF	MEX	Éric Cantú
6	MF	MEX	César Vega
7	MF	MEX	Luis Gutiérrez
8	MF	MEX	Tomás Montano
9	FW	MEX	Saúl Ramírez
10	MF	MEX	Jair González
11	MF	MEX	Luís Morales
12	DF	MEX	Miguel Lozano
13	DF	MEX	Jan Ontiveros
14	FW	MEX	Luis Loroña
16	MF	MEX	Rubén Domínguez
17	FW	MEX	José Reyes

No.	Pos.	Nation	Player
18	MF	MEX	Jesús Torres
19	MF	MEX	Aldieri Valenzuela
20	DF	MEX	Eduardo Castillo
21	DF	MEX	David Oteo
22	DF	MEX	Iñaki Castillo
23	FW	MEX	Carlos Siqueiros
24	GK	MEX	Erick de Loa
25	GK	MEX	Dylan Flores
26	MF	MEX	Brayan Muñóz
27	FW	COL	Juan David Angulo
28	MF	MEX	Jared Torres
29	FW	MEX	Diego Alvarado
30	DF	MEX	Alonso Escoboza
33	GK	MEX	Jair Peláez
35	MF	MEX	Sergio Flores

== Reserves ==
=== Alacranes B ===
The team participated in the Liga de Nuevos Talentos, the former secondary subdivision of the Segunda División, finishing as runners-up in the Revolución 2011 tournament.
