= Jesús Aarón Soto =

Mexican footballer (born 1985)

Jesús Aarón Soto Sánchez (born 2 July 1985) is a Mexican former football goalkeeper who played for Chiapas reserve team. He also played for Guerreros and Petroleros de Salamanca in the Liga de Ascenso.

Soto is the goalkeeping coach for Atletico Chiapas.
