= José Ángel Coronel =

Mexican footballer (born 1996)

Personal information
- Full name: José Ángel Coronel Benítez
- Date of birth: 23 November 1996 (age 29)
- Place of birth: Culiacán, Sinaloa, Mexico
- Height: 1.73 m (5 ft 8 in)
- Position: Forward

Youth career
- 2015: Chiapas F. C.
- 2015–2019: Sinaloa

Senior career*
Years	Team	Apps	(Gls)
2014	Cocula FC	24	(17)
2015-2019	Sinaloa	81	(42)
2020	Loros UdeC	15	(5)
2021	Tepatitlán	6	(3)
2021-2022	Tritones Vallarta	28	(15)
2022–2024	Chihuahua	32	(5)
- * Club domestic league appearances and goals as of 18:29 UTC, 20 June 2022

José Ángel Coronel Benítez (born November 23, 1996) is a Mexican footballer who currently plays for Tritones Vallarta M.F.C.

He made his professional debut in a Copa MX match with Dorados de Sinaloa on 26 July 2017.
