= Alam Galindo =

Mexican footballer (born 2001)

Personal information
- Full name: Alam Fernando Galindo Gajón
- Date of birth: 21 May 2001 (age 25)
- Place of birth: Tijuana, Baja California, Mexico
- Height: 1.70 m (5 ft 7 in)
- Position: Midfielder

Team information
- Current team: Tritones Vallarta
- Number: 7

Youth career
- 2016–2022: Tijuana
- 2020: → Querétaro (loan)

Senior career*
Years	Team	Apps	(Gls)
2022–2023	Tijuana	1	(0)
2023–2024	Sinaloa	32	(1)
2024–2026	Atlético La Paz	32	(2)
2026–	Tritones Vallarta	1	(0)
- * Club domestic league appearances and goals as of 28 August 2026

Alam Fernando Galindo Gajón (born 21 May 2001) is a Mexican professional footballer who plays as a midfielder for Primera Premier club Tritones Vallarta.

== Career statistics ==
=== Club ===
As of 26 September 2022

Club	Season	League			Cup		Continental		Other		Total	
Club	Season	Division	Apps	Goals	Apps	Goals	Apps	Goals	Apps	Goals	Apps	Goals
Tijuana	2022–23	Liga MX	1	0	—		—		—		1	0
Career total			1	0	0	0	0	0	0	0	1	0
