= Sergio Rodríguez (footballer, born November 1995) =

Mexican footballer

Personal information
- Full name: Sergio Alfonso Rodríguez Aguilera
- Date of birth: 26 November 1995 (age 30)
- Place of birth: Aguascalientes City, Aguascalientes, Mexico
- Height: 1.89 m (6 ft 2 in)
- Position: Attacking midfielder

Team information
- Current team: Herediano
- Number: 24

Youth career
- 2009–2016: Atlas

Senior career*
Years	Team	Apps	(Gls)
2016–2017	Atlas	2	(0)
2017–2019	Oaxaca	26	(1)
2019–2020	Tepatitlán	31	(4)
2021	Zacatecas	19	(1)
2021–2022	Tritones Vallarta	13	(4)
2022	Chihuahua	8	(2)
2023	Inter Playa	10	(0)
2023–2024	Guanacasteca	12	(1)
2025–	Herediano	0	(0)
- * Club domestic league appearances and goals as of 14:41, 26 October 2021 (UTC)

Sergio Alfonso Rodríguez Aguilera (Note: In this Spanish name, the first or paternal surname is Rodríguez and the second or maternal family name is Aguilera.) (born 26 November 1995) is a Mexican professional footballer who currently plays for Tritones Vallarta. He made his professional debut with Atlas during a Copa MX draw against Coras de Nayarit on 26 January 2016, and played his first Liga MX match in September.
