= Tritones Vallarta M.F.C. =

Tritones Vallarta
- Full name: Tritones Vallarta M Fútbol Club
- Nickname: Tritones (Tritons)
- Founded: July 2021; 5 years ago
- Ground: Club Deportivo Curiel
- Capacity: 1,000
- Owner: Eduardo Rangel
- Chairman: Eduardo Rangel
- Manager: Ricardo Jiménez
- League: Liga Premier (Primera Premier)
- 2025–26: Regular phase: 6th of 14 (Group I); Final phase: Quarter-finals
| Home colours | Away colours |

Tritones Vallarta M Fútbol Club is a professional football club based in Puerto Vallarta, Jalisco. The club competes in Liga Premier (Primera Premier), the third level of Mexican football, and plays its home matches at Club Deportivo Curiel.

== History ==
At the end of July 2021, it was reported about that a new soccer team would be located on the Mexican Pacific coast, without knowing the name or the city where it would be located, although it was mentioned that it would be led by Manuel Naya Barba. On July 30, it was officially announced that the new team would be called Tritones Vallarta M.F.C. and would be based in Puerto Vallarta, Jalisco. The team was created with the aim of forming a club that achieves identity in the city and its metropolitan area due to the absence of a representative club, in addition, the idea of seeking to reach the Liga de Expansión MX in a period of two years.

Following the announcement of its creation, the club announced its first players: Julián Barajas; Sergio Rodríguez; Kevyn Montaño; César Landa; Alan Jaramillo; José Coronel and Bryan Álvarez.

The team played its first official game on September 18, 2021, in the game Vallarta defeated Mineros de Fresnillo 0–1 and Julián Barajas scored the first goal in the team's history.

== Stadium ==
Club Deportivo Curiel is a football complex located in Puerto Vallarta, Jalisco. It has a main field which has the capacity to host 1,000 people.

In July 2026, the club announced the construction of its own stadium after reaching an agreement with the government of Jalisco for the transfer of land.

== Players ==
As of August 28, 2026

=== Current squad ===
Note: Flags indicate national team as defined under FIFA eligibility rules; some limited exceptions apply. Players may hold more than one non-FIFA nationality.

| No. | Pos. | Nation | Player |
|---|---|---|---|
| 1 | GK | MEX | Martín Zúñiga |
| 2 | DF | MEX | Héctor Vargas |
| 3 | DF | MEX | Nelson García |
| 4 | DF | MEX | Fernando Piña |
| 5 | DF | MEX | Raúl Beltrán |
| 6 | DF | MEX | Jean Ramos |
| 7 | MF | MEX | Alam Galindo |
| 8 | MF | MEX | Diego Magaña |
| 9 | FW | MEX | Christian Saucedo |
| 10 | MF | MEX | Jesús Quintero |
| 11 | MF | MEX | Josué Arana |
| 12 | MF | MEX | Cristopher Molina |
| 13 | GK | MEX | Maximiliano Almada |
| 14 | MF | MEX | Carlos Jasso |
| 15 | DF | MEX | Ángel Quezada |
| 16 | DF | MEX | Fernando González |

| No. | Pos. | Nation | Player |
|---|---|---|---|
| 17 | FW | MEX | Aldo Suárez |
| 18 | MF | MEX | Mario Santana |
| 19 | MF | MEX | Sergio Jiménez |
| 20 | MF | MEX | Óscar Chacón |
| 21 | DF | MEX | Alán Hernández |
| 22 | MF | MEX | Alejandro Ávila |
| 23 | FW | MEX | Pedro Pacheco |
| 24 | FW | MEX | Sebastián Hernández |
| 25 | GK | MEX | Luis Villegas |
| 26 | MF | MEX | Jorge Yañez |
| 27 | MF | MEX | Said Venegas |
| 29 | FW | COL | Luis Ángel González |
| 30 | MF | MEX | Abraham Bass |
| 31 | FW | MEX | Édgar Gutiérrez |
| 44 | DF | MEX | César López |

== Managers ==
- (Mexico) Manuel Naya Barba (2021)
- (Mexico) Ulises Sánchez (2021–2022)
- (Argentina) Hugo Norberto Castillo (2022–2023)
- (Mexico) Jesús Padrón Pérez (2023)
- (Mexico) Juan Pablo Alfaro (2023–2025)
- (Mexico) Ricardo Jiménez (2026–)
