= Luis Menes =

Mexican footballer (born 1993)

Luis Manuel Menes Rivera (born June 2, 1993, in Guadalajara) is a Mexican professional footballer who currently plays as a forward for Zacatepec.
