= Estadio Municipal Santa Rosa =

Stadium in Ciudad Guzmán, Mexico

Coordinates: 19°42′10.829″N 103°28′27.443″W

- Interactive map of Estadio Municipal Santa Rosa
- Full name: Estadio Municipal Santa Rosa
- Location: Ciudad Guzmán, Jalisco
- Owner: Zapotlán el Grande City Council
- Capacity: 4,000

Tenants
- Nacional (1976–79); Cachorros UdeG (2007–08); Mazorqueros (2016–2023); Oro (2023–2024)

Estadio Municipal Santa Rosa is a stadium in Ciudad Guzmán, Jalisco, Mexico. It is primarily used for soccer, and is the home field of the C.D. Oro. It holds 4,000 people.

== History ==
The stadium was built in the 1970s, between 1973 and 1979 it was the ground of the Club Deportivo Nacional, a team that played in the Second Division of Mexico during that period.

Between 2007 and 2008 the stadium housed Cachorros UdeG, which represented the University of Guadalajara.

In 2016 the stadium underwent a modernization to be the field of Mazorqueros F.C., whose main team played in the Liga TDP between 2016 and 2020, and in the Liga Premier de México between 2020 and 2023. In 2019 the stadium field underwent a process of improvement in order to make it suitable for matches of Segunda División.

In July 2023 Mazorqueros F.C. was dissolved due to the lack of agreement between the club and the city council for the concession for the use of the stadium, however, the Municipal Santa Rosa was not left without a team, in August C.D. Oro was established in the stadium, this team was relocated from Guadalajara to Ciudad Guzmán, after reaching an agreement with the local government.
