= Manuel Naya Barba =

Mexican association football player

Personal information
- Full name: Julio Manuel Naya Barba
- Date of birth: 17 July 1968 (age 58)
- Place of birth: Mexico City, Mexico
- Height: 1.76 m (5 ft 9 1/2 in)

Team information
- Current team: C.D. Marquense (assistant)

Managerial career
- Years: Team
- 2006–2007: Indios de Ciudad Juárez (Assistant)
- 2007–2008: Tigres B (Assistant)
- 2009: León (Assistant)
- 2010: UAT (Assistant)
- 2011: Deportivo Guamúchil (Assistant)
- 2012: UAT Academy
- 2012–2013: UAT Premier
- 2017: Real Estelí FC
- 2018–2020: Coras de Nayarit
- 2021: Tritones Vallarta
- 2022: Coras F.C.
- 2023–2024: Mexicali
- 2025: UAT (Assistant)
- 2026–: C.D. Marquense (assistant)

Julio Manuel Naya Barba (born July 17, 1968) is a Mexican football manager.

At the beginning of his career he served as assistant of Indios de Ciudad Juárez, Tigres B, León, UAT and Deportivo Guamúchil. In 2012 he was appointed as UAT Premier manager, position in which he remained until 2013. In 2017, Naya was the temporary head coach of Real Estelí FC, after that, in 2018 he was hired by Coras de Nayarit F.C.
