= Diego Gama (Mexican footballer) =

Mexican footballer (born 1996)

Personal information
- Full name: Diego Alberto Gama García
- Date of birth: 14 January 1996 (age 30)
- Place of birth: Toluca, Mexico
- Height: 1.79 m (5 ft 10 in)
- Position: Forward

Youth career
- 2010–2014: Toluca
- 2014–2015: Atlético Madrid

Senior career*
Years	Team	Apps	(Gls)
2014–2018	Toluca	5	(0)
2017–2018	→ Potros UAEM (loan)	26	(3)
2018	Real Zamora	12	(3)
2019	La Piedad	12	(1)
2019–2021	Tlaxcala	49	(13)
2021–2022	Cafetaleros de Chiapas	31	(21)
2022–2024	Chihuahua	39	(20)
2024–2025	Tlaxcala	49	(9)

International career^{‡}
2014–2015	Mexico U20	5	(1)
- * Club domestic league appearances and goals as of 29 March 2025 ‡ National team caps and goals as of 25 January 2016

Diego Alberto Gama García (born 14 January 1996) is a Mexican former footballer who last played as a forward for Tlaxcala.

== Club career ==
=== Toluca ===
Diego began his football career at his hometown team Toluca in 2010. He progressed through the ranks having successful seasons with the affiliate teams until he was called up to the senior team in 2014. He made his first appearance with the first team August 6, 2014 in a Cup match against Mérida coming in as a substitute for Carlos Esquivel at half time, the match ended in a 1–1 draw, with Gama disputing 45' minutes of the game. Four days later he made his league debut with Toluca on August 10, 2014, under coach José Cardozo against Leones Negros coming in as a substitute for Lucas Lobos in the 74' minute of the game, the match ended in a 0–0 draw, with Gama participating in 16 minutes of the game.

==== Loan to Atlético Madrid ====
On August 12, 2014, Toluca agreed to loan Diego Gama to Atlético Madrid for one season. He was assigned to play with Atlético Madrid Juvenil A, the Under-19 affiliate at the club, for the 2014-15 season in the División de Honor. Diego made his competitive debut in Europe during the 2014-15 UEFA Youth League against Malmö FF on November 4, 2014. Coming in as a substitute for Roberto Núñez in the 71' minute of the match. Just 8' minutes in Diego managed to score; breaking the tie, and ending the game 2–1 in favor for Atletico Madrid. With this game Atletico advanced to the playoffs. Gama finished the season with a further 6 goals in league play. Atlético did not pick up the purchase option in Gama's contract at the end of the season.

==== Return to Toluca ====
After spending one year with Atlético Madrid Juvenil A, Diego Gama returned to Toluca to play in the Liga MX. He was given the number 17 shirt. He made his first return appearance on July 25, 2015, during the season opener against Tigres, coming in as a substitute for Enrique Triverio in the 76th minute of the game, Toluca won the match 1–0.

==== After Toluca ====
After leaving Toluca, he played for teams in the second and third levels of Mexican football, taking part in the squads of Real Zamora, C.F. La Piedad, Cafetaleros de Chiapas and Chihuahua F.C., until in 2024 he signed with Tlaxcala F.C.

At the end of the 2024–25 season, he retired as a professional footballer and began studies to become a coach.

== International career ==
On his under-20 world cup debut in the 2015 tournament, Gama was sent off in the game for an off-the-ball incident. Mexico lost the match 2–0 to Mali.

== Career statistics ==
=== Club ===
As of 18 September 2016

Club statistics
Club	Season	League			Cup		Continental				Total	
Club	Season	Division	Apps	Goals	Apps	Goals	Apps	Goals	Apps	Goals	Apps	Goals
Mexico		League			Copa MX		North America		South America		Total	
Toluca	2014–15	Liga MX	1	0	1	0	—		—		2	0
Toluca	2015–16	Liga MX	1	0	3	0	—		0	0	4	0
Toluca	2016–17	Liga MX	3	0	3	1	—		—		6	1
Toluca	Total		5	0	7	1	—		0	0	12	1
Career total			5	0	7	1	—		0	0	12	1
