= Abraham Bass (footballer) =

Mexican footballer (born 2001)

Personal information
- Full name: Abraham Bass Flores
- Date of birth: 9 August 2001 (age 25)
- Place of birth: Álvaro Obregón, Mexico City, Mexico
- Height: 1.80 m (5 ft 11 in)
- Position: Defensive midfielder

Team information
- Current team: Tritones Vallarta
- Number: 30

Youth career
- 2018–2020: Atlético Altamira
- 2020–2021: Tampico Madero
- 2021–2022: Atlas

Senior career*
Years	Team	Apps	(Gls)
2020–2021	Tampico Madero	6	(0)
2022–2026	Atlas	13	(0)
2025	→ Atlético La Paz (loan)	12	(0)
2026–	Tritones Vallarta	1	(0)
- * Club domestic league appearances and goals as of 28 August 2026

Abraham Bass Flores (born 9 August 2001) is a Mexican professional footballer who plays as a defensive midfielder for Primera Premier club Tritones Vallarta.

== Career statistics ==
=== Club ===
As of 11 April 2026

Club	Season	League			Cup		Continental		Other		Total	
Club	Season	Division	Apps	Goals	Apps	Goals	Apps	Goals	Apps	Goals	Apps	Goals
Tampico Madero	2020–21	Liga de Expansión MX	6	0	—		—		—		6	0
Atlas	2022–23	Liga MX	1	0	—		—		—		1	0
Atlas	2023–24	Liga MX	11	0	—		—		—		11	0
Atlas	2024–25	Liga MX	1	0	—		—		1 (Note: Appearances in Leagues Cup)	0	2	0
Atlas	Total		13	0	—		—		1	0	14	0
Atlético La Paz (loan)	2025–26	Liga de Expansión MX	12	0	—		—		—		12	0
Career total			31	0	0	0	0	0	1	0	32	0
