= F.C. Bavaria Tultitlán =

Generales de Tultitlan
- Full name: Generales de Tultitlan
- Founded: 2011
- Dissolved: 2013
- Ground: Cartagena Tultitlán Tultitlán, Mexico State
- Chairman: Mario Díaz Beltrán
- League: Segunda División Profesional
- Website: http://www.generalesdetultitlan.com
Home colours	Away colours	Third colours

F.C. Bavaria Tultitlan was a football club that plays in the Mexican Football League Segunda División Profesional. The club is based in Tultitlán, Mexico State, Mexico. The club was an affiliate to German club FC Bayern Munich.

== See also ==
- Football in Mexico
