= Zapotlán =

Zapotlán may refer to one of several locations in Mexico:

- Zapotlán el Grande, city and municipality in the state of Jalisco
- Zapotlán de Juárez, city and municipality in the state of Hidalgo
- Zapotlán del Rey, city and municipality in the state of Jalisco
