= Instituto Once México =

Colegio Once México
- Full name: Colegio Once México
- Founded: 2011; 14 years ago
- Ground: Estadio Rafael Murillo Vidal; Córdoba, Veracruz
- Capacity: 3,800
- Chairman: Linda Pérez Montes
- Manager: René Olmos Mendoza
- League: Liga TDP
- 2020–21: 7th – Group II
Home colours	Away colours

Colegio Once México is a Mexican football Club. They reside in Mexico City. The club currently places in the Tercera División de México.

The team was founded in 2011 and began playing its matches in the Liga de Nuevos Talentos, initially they settled in the municipality of Zapopan, Jalisco, which is part of the Guadalajara metropolitan area. In 2013, the team stopped participating in that league and began to play in the Third Division.

Between 2015 and 2020, the team registration was rented by other teams. In the 2019–20 season, the register was used by Cafetaleros de Córdoba. From the 2020–21 season, the team returned as Colegio Once México Córdoba.

In 2021, the club's registration was transferred to C.D.C. Olimpo, a football team based in Mexico City, which began competing professionally in that year, being the user of the franchise from that moment on.

== Current roster ==
- Updated on October 4, 2019.

Note: Flags indicate national team as defined under FIFA eligibility rules; some limited exceptions apply. Players may hold more than one non-FIFA nationality.

No.	Pos.	Nation	Player
