= Héctor Jair Real =

Mexican association football player

Personal information
- Full name: Héctor Jair Real Cobián
- Date of birth: 13 July 1981 (age 45)
- Height: 1.83 m (6 ft 0 in)

Team information
- Current team: Durango (Head coach)

Managerial career
- Years: Team
- 2014–2016: Inter Playa del Carmen
- 2017–2018: La Piedad
- 2018: Real Zamora
- 2019: La Piedad
- 2019–2023: Durango
- 2023–2024: Racing Porto Palmeiras
- 2024–2025: Tepatitlán
- 2026–: Durango

Héctor Jair Real Cobián (born July 13, 1981) is a Mexican football manager.

Between 2014 and 2016 he was the manager of Inter Playa del Carmen. Subsequently, the technician served as head of the C.F. La Piedad and Real Zamora. On April 26, 2019 he was appointed as coach of Alacranes de Durango.

Héctor Jair Real is nephew of José Luis Real, who is another football coach and former player.
