= Víctor Torres (footballer) =

Mexican footballer (born 1995)

Personal information
- Full name: Víctor Guadalupe Torres Chávez
- Date of birth: 27 August 1995 (age 31)
- Place of birth: Culiacán, Sinaloa, Mexico
- Height: 1.96 m (6 ft 5 in)
- Position: Centre-back

Team information
- Current team: Malacateco
- Number: 16

Youth career
- 2017: Sinaloa

Senior career*
Years	Team	Apps	(Gls)
2018–2021	Sinaloa	38	(1)
2019	→ Tijuana (loan)	0	(0)
2021–2022	Chiapas	14	(4)
2022–2024	UAT	46	(3)
2024–	Malacateco	29	(0)
- * Club domestic league appearances and goals as of 20:17, 17 July 2023 (UTC)

Víctor Guadalupe Torres Chávez (born 27 August 1995) is a Mexican footballer who plays as a centre-back for Liga Nacional club Malacateco.
