= Mazorqueros F.C. =

- Full name: Mazorqueros Fútbol Club Zapotlán
- Nickname: Los Mazorqueros (The Corncobers)
- Founded: 1985; 41 years ago 19 May 2016; 10 years ago (refounded)
- Dissolved: 20 July 2023; 3 years ago
- Ground: Estadio Municipal Santa Rosa; Ciudad Guzmán, Jalisco
- Capacity: 4,000
- Owner: GLS Promotoría del Deporte
- Chairman: Arturo Lomelí
- League: Liga Premier (Serie B)
- Clausura 2023: Regular phase: 7th Final phase: Repechage
Home colours	Away colours

Mazorqueros Fútbol Club Zapotlán, simplified as Mazorqueros FC, was a Mexican professional football club based in Ciudad Guzmán, Jalisco. It competed in the Liga Premier - Serie B, the third level division of Mexican football, and played its home matches at the Estadio Municipal Santa Rosa. The club was dissolved in 2023 after being relocated to Santiago, Nuevo León and merged with Santiago Fútbol Club.

== History ==
In 1985, a club named Mazorqueros Fútbol Club Zapotlán was founded in Zapotlán, Jalisco, the team participated in the Tercera División de México until being dissolved in the mid-1990s. In 1990, this team played a promotion playoff to the Segunda División 'B' de México.

On May 19, 2016, the team was refounded and was now based in Ciudad Guzmán, Jalisco. The squad was created to seek promotion to a higher category in addition to developing football among the local population.

On July 17, 2020, Mazorqueros was promoted to Segunda División de México due to an expansion of participating teams in the league. However, the club maintained the Liga TDP team as a second squad.

The team won its first official title on May 8, 2022, when it won the Torneo Clausura 2022 after defeating Cafetaleros de Chiapas. After the tournament ended, most of the squad and technical staff of this team was used to form the Atlético La Paz from Liga de Expansión MX, a team that shared ownership with Mazorqueros F.C. During that season, the club reserves team was champion of the Tercera División de México, so Mazorqueros got a second franchise to participate in the Segunda División de México.

After the founding of the new team at La Paz, Baja California Sur, Mazorqueros became the reserve team of Atlético La Paz after Tampico Madero was transferred to the city, and was relocated to the Serie B because it became a development team, due to this fact, Mazorqueros eliminated its own reserve team, leaving only one squad with the champion players of the Liga TDP and using only one Liga Premier license.

On July 20, 2023, the club announced its dissolution in a statement published on its social networks. The team argued that it was very difficult to continue with the project due to the fact that the city council refused to cede the stadium to the club, making it virtually impossible to carry out improvement works in the venue, which were required by the league, for which reason the board of directors decided to dissolve the team due to the lack of guarantees for its continuity in the city.

Later it was learned that the Mazorqueros franchise was acquired by Santiago F.C., a team from Santiago, Nuevo León, so the team changed its name and was relocated to Santiago, Nuevo León and merged with Santiago F.C., eliminating any possibility of the return of the Mazorqueros franchise in the future.

== Honours ==
=== National ===
==== Promotion divisions ====
- Liga Premier
  - Champions (1): Clausura 2022
- Campeón de Campeones de la Liga Premier
  - Runners-up (1): 2022

== Reserves ==
=== Mazorqueros "B" ===
The team participated in the Tercera División de México, finishing as champions in the 2021–2022 season.

== See also ==
- Atlético La Paz
- Segunda División de México
