= Estadio Francisco Zarco =

Multi-use stadium in Durango, Mexico

Coordinates: 24°0′51.59″N 104°41′12.87″W

- El Nido del Alacrán "The Scorpion Nest"
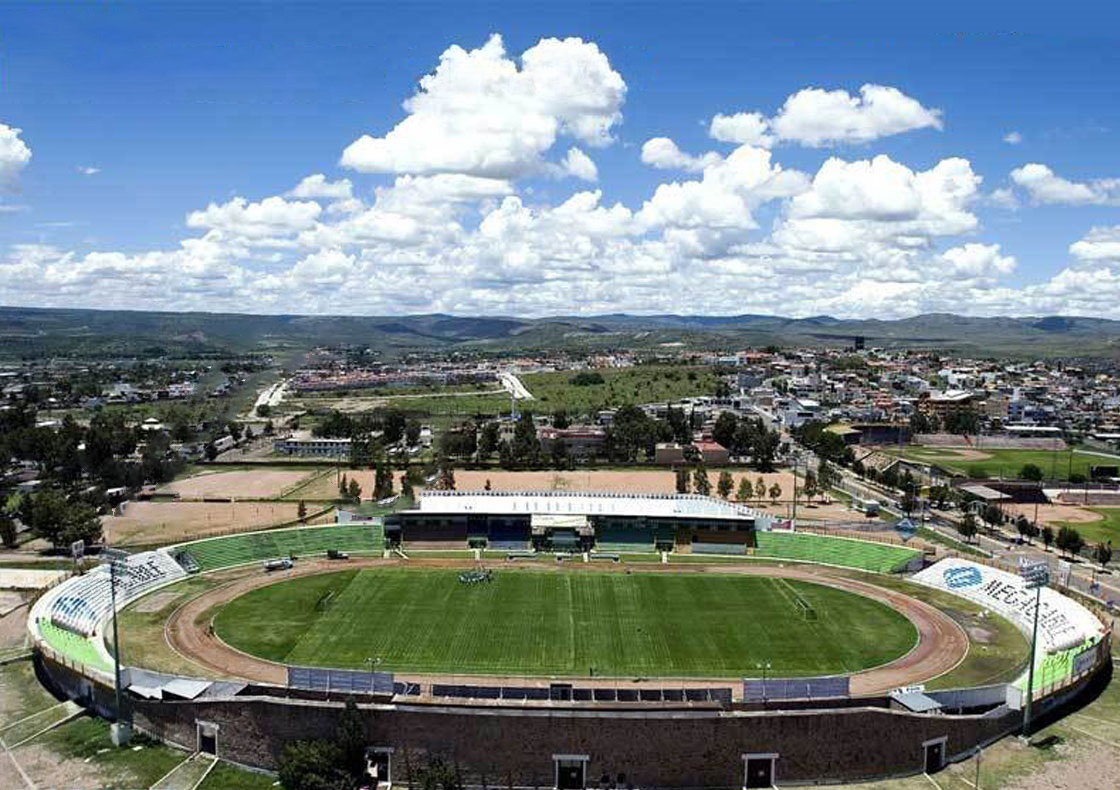
- Estadio Francisco Zarco at 2014
- Interactive map of Estadio Francisco Zarco
- Full name: Estadio Francisco Zarco
- Location: Durango City, Durango, Mexico
- Owner: Government of Durango
- Operator: Alacranes de Durango
- Capacity: 18,000
- Surface: Grass

Construction
- Opened: 24 November 1959

Tenants
- Alacranes de Durango (1997–present); Dorados de Villa (2014–15); Acaxees de Durango (2020)

The Estadio Francisco Zarco is a multi-use stadium in the Mexican city of Durango. The stadium holds 18,000 people. It is used mostly for football matches, and is the home stadium of Alacranes de Durango (as of 2014–15, playing in the third tier of Mexican football) and of fourth-tier club Dorados de Villa (Teca Huixquilucan). The stadium is owned by the state of Durango.

In February 2015, the State Ministry of Public Works stated the stadium and surroundings were to be the subject of improvement works – not, as had been suggested, demolition – and private investment was being invited.
