= Atlético Chiapas =

- Full name: Club Atlético Chiapas
- Nicknames: Los Guerreros (The Warriors); El Atlético (The Athletic)
- Founded: 27 June 1999; 26 years ago
- Dissolved: 19 June 2015; 10 years ago
- Ground: Estadio Víctor Manuel Reyna; Tuxtla Gutiérrez, Chiapas, Mexico
- Capacity: 31,500
- Chairman: Gabriel Orantes Constanzo
- Manager: Benjamín Mora
- League: Liga de Nuevos Talentos
Home colours	Away colours

Club Atlético Chiapas was a Mexican football club based in Tuxtla Gutiérrez, Chiapas. The club played in the Liga de Nuevos Talentos of the Segunda División de México and played their home team match games in the Estadio Víctor Manuel Reyna. The club was dissolved on July 19, 2015.

== History ==
The club was founded in 1999 and played in the Primera División 'A' de México, Liga Premier de Ascenso and Liga de Nuevos Talentos.

The team was founded in 1999 and was registered in the Segunda División de México, in 2001 it got a place in the Primera División 'A' de México after buying the license from Real San Sebastián. However, in the summer of 2002 Jaguares de Chiapas was created and registered in the Primera División de México after the relocation of Tiburones Rojos de Veracruz to Tuxtla Gutiérrez, Chiapas, so Atlético Chiapas was relocated to Mérida, Yucatán and was renamed Atlético Yucatán.

In 2013, the team was recovered to participate in the Liga de Nuevos Talentos, forming part of the structure of Chiapas F.C. In 2014, the team was promoted to the Liga Premier de Ascenso after obtaining the Unión de Curtidores license.

In the summer of 2015, the Federación Mexicana de Fútbol (FMF) forced the participating clubs of the Primera División de México to have a reserve team taking part in the Liga Premier de Ascenso, so Atlético Chiapas was reformed to become Chiapas F.C. Premier, for which Atlético Chiapas was dissolved.

== Competitive record ==
Torneo	Tier	Position	Matches	Wins	Draws	Losses	GF (Note: Goals for / scored)	GA (Note: Goals against / conceded)
Apertura 2012	Liga Nuevo Talentos	9th/Sweet 16	13	7	1	5	18	13
Clausura 2013	Liga Nuevo Talentos	5th/Quarterfinal	15	7	3	3	23	20
Apertura 2013	Liga Nuevo Talentos	7th/Semifinal	14	7	3	4	27	22
Clausura 2014	Liga Nuevo Talentos	21st	14	3	2	9	17	28
Apertura 2014	Liga Premier	17th	13	3	4	6	17	20
Clausura 2015	Liga Premier	Current	6	4	–	2	5	3
Totals	1 Semifinalist	3/5	69	27	13	27	93	103

== See also ==
- Football in Mexico
