= Chihuahua F.C. =

Mexican association football club

- Full name: Chihuahua Fútbol Club
- Nicknames: Los soles (The suns); La escuadra del sol desértico (The team of the desertic sun)
- Founded: 25 May 2022; 3 years ago
- Dissolved: 20 March 2024; 22 months ago
- Ground: Estadio Olímpico Universitario José Reyes Baeza; Chihuahua, Chihuahua, Mexico
- Capacity: 22,000
- Owner: Grupo Xoy Capital
- Chairman: Anuar Talamas
- League: Liga Premier de México - Serie A
- 2023–24: Disaffiliated
- Website: https://chihuahuafc.mx/
Home colours	Away colours	Third colours

Chihuahua Fútbol Club was a Mexican professional football team based in Chihuahua, Chihuahua that played in the Liga Premier de México.

== History ==
In the summer of 2020 UACH F.C. was put on hiatus due to financial problems as a result of the impact of COVID-19, leaving Chihuahua City without a professional football team. Subsequently, some initiatives arose to return football to the city, especially through the purchase of a franchise in the Liga de Expansión MX, however, there was no agreement to finalize the purchase of a new team.

After the failure of the initial plans, the owners of Grupo Xoy Capital obtained the franchise belonging to UACH F.C., which had been on hiatus since 2020 and shared the city with Chihuahua F.C. In May 2022 the new team was officially presented.

In January 2024, Yox Capital, the company that provided financial support to Chihuahua F.C. faced accusations of fraud and was sued, initially the team seemed to be safe from the problem, however, on February 28 it was announced that the reserve team of Chihuahua F.C. left the Liga TDP due to budget problems. At the beginning of March the main team of Chihuahua F.C. began to be affected by the crisis of the owner company, which is why it stopped playing its Liga Premier matches. On March 20, the Mexican Football Federation began the process of disaffiliation from the club, because its owner, Venezuelan businessman Carlos Lazo, is subject to an international search and arrest warrant, which according to Mexican football regulations is a cause for the expulsion of a team from the country's professional football league system.

== Stadium ==
The Estadio Olímpico Universitario José Reyes Baeza is a multi-use stadium in Chihuahua, Chihuahua, Mexico. It is currently used mostly for football, American football and concerts. The stadium holds 22,000 people.

=== Reserve teams ===
Chihuahua F.C. (Liga TDP)
Reserve team that plays in the Liga TDP, the fourth level of the Mexican league system.

== Managers ==
- (Mexico) Diego López (2022-2023)
- (Mexico) Carlos Kanahan (2023)
- (Mexico) Alejandro Pérez Macías (2023-2024)
