= 2022–23 Serie A de México season =

Serie A de México
- Season: 2022–23
- Champions: Apertura: Tuzos UAZ (1st title); Clausura: Tampico Madero (3rd title)
- Promoted: Aguacateros CDU; Deportiva Venados
- Matches: 330
- Goals: 1,044 (3.16 per match)
- Top goalscorer: Apertura: Klinsman Calderón (11 goals); Clausura: Eduardo Mustre (11 goals)
- Biggest home win: Apertura: Chihuahua 6–0 Mexicali (28 September 2022); Clausura: Dongu 13–0 Real de Arteaga (18 February 2023)
- Biggest away win: Apertura: Yalmakán 0–4 Pachuca (8 September 2022); Clausura: Real de Arteaga 0–9 Sporting Canamy (26 February 2023)
- Highest scoring: Apertura: Lobos ULMX 3–5 Tampico Madero (29 August 2022); Escorpiones 5–3 Montañeses (7 September 2022); Clausura:Dongu 13–0 Real de Arteaga (18 February 2023)
- Longest winning run: Apertura: 6 matches Chihuahua; Clausura: 9 matches Tampico Madero
- Longest unbeaten run: Apertura: 10 matches Tampico Madero; Clausura: 10 matches Tampico Madero
- Longest winless run: Apertura: 10 matches Catedráticos Elite; Leviatán; Mexicali; Clausura: 10 matches Leones Negros; Real de Arteaga
- Longest losing run: Apertura: 9 matches Mexicali; Clausura: 10 matches Real de Arteaga
- Highest attendance: Apertura: 9,000; Chihuahua 1–0 Tecos (7 October 2022); Clausura: 16,000; Tampico Madero 3–0 UAT (21 January 2023)
- Lowest attendance: Apertura: 30; Colima 4–2 UAT (28 September 2022); Clausura: 50; Sporting Canamy 2–2 Dongu (14 January 2023)
- Total attendance: Apertura: 140,556; Clausura: 163,921
- Average attendance: Apertura: 895; Clausura: 1,025
- Stats are from the regular season only

The 2022–23 Serie A de México season is part of the third-tier football league of Mexico. The tournament began on 26 August 2022 and will finish in May 2023.

== Offseason Changes ==
- On May 21, 2022 Aguacateros CDU was promoted from Serie B de México.
- On May 25, 2022 UACH F.C. franchise on hiatus was reactivated and renamed Chihuahua F.C.
- On May 28, 2022 Deportiva Venados was promoted from Liga TDP.
- On June 14, 2022 Durango was accepted as a new member of the Liga de Expansión MX after passing the certification process to join the competition, Durango was the champion of the 2021–22 Serie A de México season.
- On June 22, 2022, the Atlético Reynosa franchise was reactivated, the team was relocated to Tampico and Ciudad Madero and renamed Tampico Madero.
- On July 1, 2022 Los Cabos United, Mexicali, Real de Arteaga and Tulancingo joined the league as expansion teams.
- On July 1, 2022 Pachuca Reserve Team was reactivated after a 4–years hiatus.
- On July 1, 2022 Cañoneros and Mazorqueros were relocated at Serie B de México.
- On July 14, 2022, Liguilla de Filiales (reserve teams play-off) it was recovered after three years without playing. Six teams have this condition and are not eligible for promotion to Liga de Expansión MX: Cimarrones de Sonora, Leones Negros UdeG, Lobos ULMX, Mineros de Fresnillo, Pachuca and UAT. The best four teams with this condition will play the play-offs.

=== Clausura Tournament changes ===
- On January 27, 2023 Catedráticos Elite F.C. was relocated from Ameca, Jalisco to Salamanca, Guanajuato.

== Teams information ==
=== Group 1 ===
Location of teams in the 2022–23 Serie A Group 1

Club	Manager	City	Stadium	Capacity	Affiliate
Chihuahua	(Mexico) Carlos Kanahan (Interim)	Chihuahua City, Chihuahua	Olímpico UACH	22,000	–
Cimarrones de Sonora	(Mexico) Paolo Serrato	Hermosillo, Sonora	Héroe de Nacozari	18,747	Cimarrones de Sonora
Coras	(Mexico) José Rizo	Tepic, Nayarit	Nicolás Álvarez Ortega	12,271	–
Halcones de Zapopan	(Mexico) Jesús Cota	Zapotlanejo, Jalisco	Miguel Hidalgo	1,700	–
Leones Negros UdeG	(Mexico) Ahuizotl Sánchez	Zapopan, Jalisco	Instalaciones Club Deportivo U.de G. Cancha 3	3,000	Leones Negros UdeG
Los Cabos United	(Chile) Rodrigo Ruiz	Los Cabos, Baja California Sur	Complejo Don Koll	3,500	–
Mexicali	(Mexico) Enrique López Zarza	Mexicali, Baja California	Ciudad Deportiva Mexicali	5,000	–
Mineros de Fresnillo	(Mexico) Luis Ángel Muñoz	Fresnillo, Zacatecas	Unidad Deportiva Minera Fresnillo	6,000	Mineros de Zacatecas
Tecos	(Mexico) Jorge Hernández	Zapopan, Jalisco	Tres de Marzo	18,779	–
Tritones Vallarta	(Argentina) Hugo Norberto Castillo	Puerto Vallarta, Jalisco	Ciudad del Deporte San José del Valle	4,000	–
Tuzos UAZ	(Mexico) Rubén Hernández	Zacatecas City, Zacatecas	Carlos Vega Villalba	20,068	–

=== Group 2 ===
Location of teams in the 2022–23 Serie A Group 2

Club	Manager	City	Stadium	Capacity	Affiliate
Aguacateros CDU	(Mexico) Edgar Tolentino (Interim)	Uruapan, Michoacán	Unidad Deportiva Hermanos López Rayón	6,000	–
Catedráticos Elite	(Mexico) Juan Carlos Ascensio	Salamanca, Guanajuato (Note: The club played the Apertura Tournament at Núcleo Deportivo y de Espectáculos Ameca in Ameca, Jalisco.)	Sección XXIV	10,000	–
Colima	(Mexico) Usiel Andrade	Colima City, Colima	Olímpico Universitario de Colima	11,812	–
Gavilanes de Matamoros	(Mexico) Julio García	Matamoros, Tamaulipas	El Hogar	22,000	–
Inter Querétaro	(Mexico) Hugo Serrano	Querétaro City, Querétaro	Olímpico de Querétaro	4,600	–
La Piedad	(Mexico) Enrique Pérez	La Piedad, Michoacán	Juan N. López	13,356	–
Lobos ULMX	(Mexico) Rowan Vargas	Celaya, Guanajuato	Miguel Alemán Valdés	23,182	Celaya
Saltillo	(Mexico) Jair García	Saltillo, Coahuila	Olímpico Francisco I. Madero	7,000	–
Tampico Madero	(Mexico) Gastón Obledo	Tampico and Ciudad Madero, Tamaulipas	Tamaulipas	19,667	–
Tulancingo	(Mexico) Luis Alfonso Lugo	Tulancingo, Hidalgo	Primero de Mayo	2,500	–
UAT	(Mexico) Gandhi Vega	Ciudad Victoria, Tamaulipas	Marte R. Gómez (Note: Although the club registered the Estadio Marte R. Gómez as its official field, the team plays most of its matches at the Estadio Universitario Eugenio Alvizo Porras)	10,520	UAT

=== Group 3 ===
Location of teams in the 2022–23 Serie A Group 3

Club	Manager	City	Stadium	Capacity	Affiliate
Cafetaleros de Chiapas	(Mexico) Jesús Palacios	Tuxtla Gutiérrez, Chiapas	Víctor Manuel Reyna	29,001	–
Deportiva Venados	(Mexico) Arturo Espinoza	Tamanché, Yucatán	Alonso Diego Molina	2,500	–
Dongu	(Mexico) Marcos Fuentes	Cuautitlán, State of Mexico	Los Pinos	5,000	–
Escorpiones	(Mexico) Omar Ramírez	Cuernavaca, Morelos	Centenario	14,800	–
Inter Playa del Carmen	(Mexico) Carlos Bracamontes	Playa del Carmen, Quintana Roo	Unidad Deportiva Mario Villanueva Madrid	7,500	–
Leviatán	(Mexico) Carlos Alberto Valdéz	Mexico City	Jesús Martínez "Palillo"	6,000	–
Montañeses	(Mexico) Víctor Hernández	Orizaba, Veracruz	Socum (Note: Although the club registered the Estadio Socum as its official field, the team played most of its 2022–23 season matches at the Complejo Deportivo Orizaba Sur, the team was relocated to Estadio Socum on 26 February 2023.)	7,000	–
Pachuca	(Colombia) Andrés Chitiva	Pachuca, Hidalgo	Hidalgo	30,000	Pachuca
Real de Arteaga	(Mexico) Roberto Montes de Oca	Querétaro City, Querétaro	Olímpico de Querétaro	4,600	–
Sporting Canamy	(Mexico) Juan Carlos Rico	Oaxtepec, Morelos	Olímpico de Oaxtepec	9,000	–
Yalmakán	(Mexico) Mendivi Mis (Interim)	Chetumal, Quintana Roo	José López Portillo (Note: Although the club registered the Estadio José López Portillo as its official field, the team played its Apertura Tournament matches at the Estadio 10 de Abril.)	6,600	–

== Torneo Apertura ==
=== Group 1 ===
==== Standings ====
Pos	Team	Pld	W	D	L	GF	GA	GD	BP	Pts	Qualification or relegation
1	UAZ (C)	10	7	1	2	26	9	+17	3	25	Qualification to Liguilla de Ascenso
2	Los Cabos United	10	7	2	1	15	5	+10	2	25	Qualification to Liguilla de Ascenso
3	Chihuahua	10	6	3	1	17	6	+11	0	21	Qualification to Liguilla de Ascenso
4	Tritones Vallarta	10	6	2	2	14	8	+6	1	21	Copa Conecta
5	Cimarrones de Sonora	10	4	2	4	15	21	−6	1	15	Qualification to Liguilla de Filiales
6	Leones Negros UdeG	10	4	1	5	16	16	0	1	14	Qualification to Liguilla de Filiales
7	Coras	10	3	3	4	13	13	0	0	12	
8	Halcones de Zapopan	10	3	2	5	13	18	−5	0	11	
9	Mineros de Fresnillo	10	3	1	6	19	17	+2	0	10	
10	Tecos	10	3	0	7	15	21	−6	1	10	
11	Mexicali	10	0	1	9	4	33	−29	0	1	

Updated to match(es) played on 22 October 2022. Source: Liga Premier FMF
(C) Champions

==== Positions by Round ====
Qualification to quarter-finals
Last place in table

Team ╲ Round	1	2	3	4	5	6	7	8	9	10	11
UAZ	1	1	1	1	2†	2	2	1	1	1	1
Los Cabos	3	2	2	2	1	1	1	2	4†	2	2
Chihuahua	6	9	7	8†	4	4	3	4	3	3	3
Tritones Vallarta	4	6†	9	6	3	3	4	3	2	4	4
Cimarrones	5	8	6	4	6	7	7	7†	8	6	5
Leones Negros	2	3	4	7	9	6	5	5	5	5†	6
Coras	9	5	8†	9	8	9	9	8	9	10	7
Zapopan	8	7	5	3	5	5	6†	6	7	7	8
Fresnillo	10	4	3	5	7	8†	8	9	6	8	9
Tecos	7†	10	10	10	10	10	10	10	10	9	10
Mexicali	11	11	11	11	11	11	11	11	11	11	11†

Updated to match(es) played on 22 October 2022. Source: Liga Premier FMF
Notes: † indicates team rested that round

==== Results ====
Home \ Away	CHI	CIM	COR	FRE	HZP	LNU	LCU	MXL	TEC	TRV	UAZ
Chihuahua	—	1–1	—	—	0–0	4–0	2–1	6–0	1–0	—	—
Cimarrones	—	—	—	2–1	—	—	1–3	3–1	—	0–1	—
Coras	3–0	2–2	—	2–0	—	1–2	—	—	3–2	—	—
Fresnillo	1–2	—	—	—	4–0	—	0–1	6–1	—	0–1	—
Halcones de Zapopan	—	0–1	2–1	—	—	1–1	—	—	3–1	—	2–4
Leones Negros	—	2–3	—	3–1	—	—	—	5–0	—	0–3	—
Los Cabos	—	—	0–0	—	2–1	1–0	—	—	3–0	—	1–0
Mexicali	—	—	1–1	—	1–2	—	0–2	—	0–3	—	0–3
Tecos	—	4–1	—	2–3	—	0–3	—	—	—	3–1	—
Tritones Vallarta	0–0	—	1–0	—	3–2	—	1–1	2–0	—	—	1–2
UAZ	0–1	6–1	3–0	2–2	—	2–0	—	—	3–0	—	—

Updated to match(es) played on 22 October 2022. Source: Liga Premier FMF
Legend: Blue = home team win; Yellow = draw; Red = away team win.

=== Group 2 ===
==== Standings ====
Pos	Team	Pld	W	D	L	GF	GA	GD	BP	Pts	Qualification or relegation
1	Tampico Madero	10	8	2	0	30	13	+17	4	30	Qualification to Liguilla de Ascenso
2	La Piedad	10	7	1	2	20	7	+13	1	23	Qualification to Liguilla de Ascenso
3	Aguacateros CDU	10	6	2	2	30	16	+14	0	20	Qualification to Liguilla de Ascenso
4	Saltillo	10	5	2	3	16	12	+4	2	19	Copa Conecta
5	Gavilanes de Matamoros	10	5	2	3	17	13	+4	1	18	
6	Colima	10	4	3	3	16	12	+4	2	17	
7	Lobos ULMX	10	4	2	4	15	21	−6	0	14	Qualification to Liguilla de Filiales
8	UAT	10	2	3	5	18	23	−5	1	10	
9	Tulancingo	10	1	3	6	6	15	−9	0	6	
10	Inter Querétaro	10	1	2	7	8	28	−20	0	5	
11	Catedráticos Elite	10	0	2	8	11	27	−16	1	3	

Updated to match(es) played on 23 October 2022. Source: Liga Premier FMF

==== Positions by Round ====
Qualification to quarter-finals
Last place in table

Team ╲ Round	1	2	3	4	5	6	7	8	9	10	11
Tampico Madero	1	1	1	1	1	1	1	1	1	1	1†
La Piedad	2	2	2	2	2	2	2	2	2†	2	2
Aguacateros CDU	3	3	3	4	5†	4	3	3	3	3	3
Saltillo	5	6	5	3	3	3	6†	6	5	4	4
Gavilanes	4	5	7†	7	7	7	5	4	4	5	5
Colima	6	7	6	6†	6	5	4	5	6	6	6
Lobos ULMX	9	4	4	5	4	6	7	7	7	7†	7
UAT	11	9†	8	9	9	8	8	9	8	8	8
Tulancingo	10	11	10	11	8	9†	9	8	9	9	9
Inter Querétaro	7†	10	9	10	11	11	11	11	11	10	10
Catedráticos Elite	8	8	11	8	10	10	10	10†	10	11	11

Updated to match(es) played on 23 October 2022. Source: Liga Premier FMF
Notes: † indicates team rested that round

==== Results ====
Home \ Away	ADU	CAT	COL	GAV	INQ	LPD	LUM	SAL	TAM	TUL	UAT
Aguacateros CDU	—	6–1	—	4–2	5–1	—	1–1	4–1	—	3–0	—
Catedráticos Elite	—	—	0–1	—	—	1–1	1–2	—	2–3	3–3	—
Colima	3–1	—	—	—	—	0–1	—	1–1	2–2	—	4–2
Gavilanes	—	1–0	1–0	—	4–1	—	—	—	—	1–0	—
Inter Querétaro	—	2–1	1–3	—	—	—	—	—	—	0–0	1–1
La Piedad	3–1	—	—	4–1	5–0	—	2–1	1–0	—	—	—
Lobos ULMX	—	—	3–2	0–5	1–0	—	—	—	3–5	—	2–2
Saltillo	—	3–0	—	1–1	3–1	—	3–1	—	—	—	—
Tampico Madero	2–2	—	—	2–0	5–1	2–1	—	3–0	—	—	—
Tulancingo	—	—	0–0	—	—	1–0	0–1	0–2	0–2	—	2–3
UAT	2–4	5–2	—	1–1	—	0–2	—	0–2	2–4	—	—

Updated to match(es) played on 23 October 2022. Source: Liga Premier FMF
Legend: Blue = home team win; Yellow = draw; Red = away team win.

=== Group 3 ===
==== Standings ====
Pos	Team	Pld	W	D	L	GF	GA	GD	BP	Pts	Qualification or relegation
1	Pachuca	10	9	0	1	30	9	+21	3	30	Qualification to the Liguilla de Filiales
2	Cafetaleros de Chiapas	10	7	2	1	21	9	+12	1	24	Qualification to the Liguilla de Ascenso
3	Sporting Canamy	10	5	2	3	21	14	+7	0	17	Qualification to the Liguilla de Ascenso
4	Montañeses	10	4	2	4	16	20	−4	2	16	Copa Conecta
5	Inter Playa del Carmen	10	4	2	4	17	15	+2	1	15	Copa Conecta
6	Deportiva Venados	10	5	0	5	11	14	−3	0	15	
7	Yalmakán	10	5	0	5	10	15	−5	0	15	
8	Dongu	10	4	0	6	13	14	−1	1	13	
9	Real de Arteaga	10	4	0	6	8	13	−5	1	13	
10	Escorpiones	10	3	1	6	18	24	−6	1	11	
11	Leviatán	10	0	1	9	5	23	−18	1	2	

Updated to match(es) played on 23 October 2022. Source: Liga Premier FMF

==== Positions by Round ====
Qualification to quarter-finals
Last place in table

Team ╲ Round	1	2	3	4	5	6	7	8	9	10	11
Pachuca	3	5†	1	1	1	1	1	1	1	1	1
Cafetaleros	9	8	5	5	2	3†	3	2	2	2	2
Sporting Canamy	1	1	2	2	4†	7	8	4	4	3	3
Montañeses	6†	3	6	8	6	8	9	5	5	6	4
Inter Playa	2	4	4	4	7	5	6†	9	10	7	5
Deportiva Venados	5	7	8	7	3	2	2	3	3	4	6†
Yalmakán	7	11	11	9	9	6	7	10†	6	5	7
Dongu	8	9	9	10†	11	10	10	8	9	10	8
Real de Arteaga	4	6	7	6	8	4	5	7	8	9†	9
Escorpiones	10	2	3	3	5	9	4	6	7†	8	10
Leviatán	11	10	10†	11	10	11	11	11	11	11	11

Updated to match(es) played on 23 October 2022. Source: Liga Premier FMF
Notes: † indicates team rested that round

==== Results ====
Home \ Away	CAF	DVE	DON	ESC	INP	LEV	MON	PAC	RAT	SCA	YAL
Cafetaleros	—	3–0	1–0	5–1	—	—	—	0–1	—	—	—
Deportiva Venados	—	—	—	0–2	2–1	3–1	0–2	—	—	1–2	—
Dongu	—	2–1	—	4–2	—	—	—	1–2	—	1–2	—
Escorpiones	—	—	—	—	2–3	2–2	5–3	—	0–1	2–1	—
Inter Playa	3–4	—	1–0	—	—	4–0	—	—	—	1–1	1–2
Leviatán	0–1	—	1–3	—	—	—	0–1	—	0–2	—	1–2
Montañeses	2–2	—	2–1	—	2–2	—	—	1–3	1–2	—	2–0
Pachuca	—	1–2	—	4–2	2–0	3–0	—	—	—	6–2	—
Real de Arteaga	0–1	0–1	0–1	—	0–1	—	—	1–4	—	—	2–0
Sporting Canamy	1–1	—	—	—	—	2–0	5–0	—	4–0	—	1–2
Yalmakán	1–3	0–1	2–0	1–0	—	—	—	0–4	—	—	—

Updated to match(es) played on 23 October 2022. Source: Liga Premier FMF
Legend: Blue = home team win; Yellow = draw; Red = away team win.

=== Regular season statistics ===
==== Top goalscorers ====
Players sorted first by goals scored, then by last name.

Rank	Player	Club	Goals
1	(Colombia) Klinsman Calderón	Cafetaleros de Chiapas	11
2	(Mexico) José Alonso Flores	Aguacateros CDU	8
3	(Mexico) Armando Bernal	UAZ	7
3	(Mexico) Diego Gama	Chihuahua	7
3	(Mexico) Abraham Vázquez	La Piedad	7
6	(Mexico) Juan Celada	Inter Playa del Carmen	6
6	(Mexico) Christopher Cortés	Saltillo	6
6	(Mexico) Sergio Gámez	Pachuca	6
6	(Mexico) Sergio Meza	Escorpiones	6
6	(Ecuador) Santiago Micolta	Deportiva Venados	6
6	(Mexico) Kevin Sandoval	Leones Negros UdeG	6

Source:Liga Premier FMF

==== Hat-tricks ====
Player	For	Against	Result	Date	Round	Reference
(Mexico) José Alonso Flores	Aguacateros CDU	Catedráticos Elite	6 – 1 (H)	7 September 2022	3	
(Colombia) Klinsman Calderón	Cafetaleros de Chiapas	Yalmakán	1 – 3 (A)	29 September 2022	7	
(Colombia) Klinsman Calderón	Cafetaleros de Chiapas	Escorpiones	5 – 1 (H)	3 October 2022	8	
(Mexico) Armando Bernal	UAZ	Cimarrones de Sonora	6 – 1 (H)	8 October 2022	9	
(Mexico) Abraham Vázquez	La Piedad	Inter de Querétaro	5 – 0 (H)	22 October 2022	11	

(H) – Home; (A) – Away

=== Attendance ===
==== Per team ====
Pos	Team	Total	High	Low	Average	Change
1	Chihuahua	43,000	9,000	4,500	7,167	n/a^{4}
2	Tampico Madero	32,000	8,000	5,000	6,400	+612.7%^{1}
3	La Piedad	15,976	5,020	1,200	3,195	+834.2%
4	Saltillo	8,250	3,000	250	2,063	+327.1%
5	Los Cabos United	5,100	2,000	300	1,020	n/a^{4}
6	Cafetaleros de Chiapas	3,559	2,000	300	890	−57.3%
7	Montañeses	3,900	1,500	400	650	−7.1%
8	Aguacateros CDU	3,900	1,000	400	650	+73.3%^{2}
9	Mexicali	2,700	1,500	100	540	n/a^{4}
10	Gavilanes de Matamoros	2,000	1,000	200	500	+185.7%
11	Yalmakán	1,600	650	200	320	−8.6%
12	Inter Playa del Carmen	1,550	500	150	310	+9.5%
13	Coras	1,500	500	100	300	−57.6%
14	Lobos ULMX	1,456	500	200	291	+123.8%
15	Tritones Vallarta	1,680	700	100	280	+4.9%
16	Pachuca	1,200	500	100	240	n/a^{4}
17	Tecos	950	300	200	238	+2.1%
18	Real de Arteaga	700	300	100	233	n/a^{4}
19	Colima	1,030	400	30	206	+20.5%
20	Escorpiones	1,000	250	150	200	+17.6%
21	Dongu	800	300	50	200	+46.0%
22	UAZ	900	200	100	150	+10.3%
23	Tulancingo	850	200	100	142	n/a^{4}
24	Inter Querétaro	565	200	100	141	+20.5%
25	Sporting Canamy	700	300	50	140	+27.3%
26	Deportiva Venados	650	300	50	130	n/a^{3}
27	Halcones de Zapopan	650	150	100	130	+62.5%
28	UAT	770	350	50	128	+91.0%
29	Leviatán	330	200	80	110	+10.0%^{6}
30	Catedráticos Elite	400	100	100	100	+100.0%
31	Fresnillo	440	100	70	88	+11.4%
32	Cimarrones de Sonora	150	100	50	75	+50.0%^{5}
33	Leones Negros	300	100	50	75	+31.6%
	League total	140,556	9,000	30	895	+178.0%

Source: Liga Premier FMF
Notes:
Only regular season listed
1: Team played Liga de Expansión MX last season.
2: Team played Liga Premier – Serie B last season.
3: Team played Liga TDP last season.
4: Team did not play last season.
5: Cimarrones de Sonora played matches against Los Cabos United and Mexicali behind closed doors.
6: Leviatán played the match against Montañeses behind closed doors.

==== Highest and lowest ====
Highest attended					Lowest attended			
Week	Home	Score	Away	Attendance	Home	Score	Away	Attendance
1	Chihuahua	1–1	Cimarrones de Sonora	4,500	Leones Negros	3–1	Mineros de Fresnillo	50
2	Tampico Madero	5–1	Inter Querétaro	7,000	Dongu	1–2	Sporting Canamy	50
3	Chihuahua	2–1	Los Cabos United	7,500	Leones Negros	2–3	Cimarrones	100
4	Tampico Madero	2–0	Gavilanes de Matamoros	5,000	Halcones de Zapopan	3–1	Tecos	100
5	Chihuahua	4–0	Leones Negros	8,000	Deportiva Venados	0–2	Montañeses	50
6	Tampico Madero	2–2	Aguacateros CDU	8,000	Leones Negros	5–0	Mexicali	50
7	Chihuahua	6–0	Mexicali	7,000	Colima	4–2	UAT	30
8	Tampico Madero	3–0	Saltillo	6,000	Sporting Canamy	4–0	Real de Arteaga	50
9	Chihuahua	1–0	Tecos	9,000	Deportiva Venados	1–2	Sporting Canamy	50
10	Chihuahua	0–0	Halcones de Zapopan	7,000	UAT	0–2	Saltillo	50
11	La Piedad	5–0	Inter Querétaro	5,020	Leviatán	1–3	Dongu	50

Source: Liga Premier FMF

1. Does not include matches played behind closed doors.

=== Liguilla ===
==== Liguilla de Ascenso ====
The two best teams and the two best third places of each group play two games against each other on a home-and-away basis. The higher seeded teams play on their home field during the second leg. The winner of each match up is determined by aggregate score. In the quarterfinals and semifinals, if the two teams are tied on aggregate the higher seeded team advances. In the final, if the two teams are tied after both legs, the match goes to extra time and, if necessary, a penalty shoot-out.

Quarter-finals
1	Tampico Madero	3	3	6
11	Sporting Canamy	2	1	3
3	Los Cabos United	0	2	2
6	Chihuahua	2	1	3
2	Tuzos UAZ	1	3	4
8	Aguacateros CDU	1	0	1
4	Cafetaleros de Chiapas	1	3	4
5	La Piedad	0	1	1

Semi-finals
1	Tampico Madero	0	3	3
6	Chihuahua	0	2	2
2	Tuzos UAZ	2	5	7
4	Cafetaleros de Chiapas	1	2	3

Final
1	Tampico Madero	1	1	2
2	Tuzos UAZ	3	0	3

===== Quarter-finals =====
The first legs will be played on 26 October, and the second legs will be played on 29 October 2022.

Team 1	Agg.	Team 2	1st leg	2nd leg
Tampico Madero	6–3	Sporting Canamy	3–2	3–1
Cafetaleros de Chiapas	4–1	La Piedad	1–0	3–1
Tuzos UAZ	4–1	Aguacateros CDU	1–1	3–0
Los Cabos United	2–3	Chihuahua	0–2	2–1

First leg

26 October 2022	Sporting Canamy	2–3	Tampico Madero	Oaxtepec, Morelos
16:00 CDT (UTC−5)	González 48'; Berrio 83'	Report	García 21'; Ramos 24', 73'	Stadium: Estadio Olímpico de Oaxtepec; Attendance: 300; Referee: Alfredo Huerta López

26 October 2022	Aguacateros CDU	1–1	Tuzos UAZ	Uruapan, Michoacán
16:00 CDT (UTC−5)	Carrillo 32'	Report	Villa 44'	Stadium: Unidad Deportiva Hermanos López Rayón; Attendance: 1,000; Referee: Diego Gilberto Gurrea Mendoza

26 October 2022	La Piedad	0–1	Cafetaleros de Chiapas	La Piedad, Michoacán
20:00 CDT (UTC−5)		Report	Almeida 80'	Stadium: Estadio Juan N. López; Attendance: 7,811; Referee: Adrián Chafino García

26 October 2022	Chihuahua	2–0	Los Cabos United	Chihuahua City, Chihuahua
20:00 MDT (UTC−6)	García 56', 74' (pen.)	Report		Stadium: Estadio Olímpico Universitario José Reyes Baeza; Attendance: 7,600; Referee: Julián Alejandro Duarte Peña

Second leg

29 October 2022	Tuzos UAZ	3–0 (4–1 agg.)	Aguacateros CDU	Zacatecas City, Zacatecas
16:00 CDT (UTC−5)	Villa 20'; García 62'; Ruvalcaba 90+1'	Report		Stadium: Estadio Carlos Vega Villalba; Attendance: 400; Referee: Jorge Carlos Ortiz León

29 October 2022	Cafetaleros de Chiapas	3–1 (4–1 agg.)	La Piedad	Tuxtla Gutiérrez, Chiapas
19:00 CDT (UTC−5)	Calderón 25', 85'; Alonso 32'	Report	Villar 61'	Stadium: Estadio Víctor Manuel Reyna; Attendance: 4,254; Referee: Jesús Enrique Herrera Armenta

29 October 2022	Tampico Madero	3–1 (6–3 agg.)	Sporting Canamy	Tampico and Ciudad Madero, Tamaulipas
20:00 CDT (UTC−5)	Oteo 8'; Miranda 37'; Ramos 84'	Report	Guzmán 35'	Stadium: Estadio Tamaulipas; Attendance: 12,000; Referee: Enrique Augusto Ramírez Gutiérrez

29 October 2022	Los Cabos United	2–1 (2–3 agg.)	Chihuahua	Los Cabos, Baja California Sur
20:00 MDT (UTC−6)	Andrey 69'; Jiménez 90'	Report	Juárez 87'	Stadium: Complejo Don Koll; Attendance: 2,000; Referee: Mauricio Eleazar López Sánchez

===== Semi-finals =====
The first legs were played on 2 November, and the second legs were played on 5 November 2022.

Team 1	Agg.	Team 2	1st leg	2nd leg
Tampico Madero	3–2	Chihuahua	0–0	3–2
Tuzos UAZ	7–3	Cafetaleros de Chiapas	2–1	5–2

First leg

2 November 2022	Cafetaleros de Chiapas	1–2	Tuzos UAZ	Tuxtla Gutiérrez, Chiapas
20:00 CST (UTC−6)	Calderón 30'	Report	Villa 63'; Torres 76'	Stadium: Estadio Víctor Manuel Reyna; Attendance: 4,782; Referee: Enrique Augusto Ramírez Gutiérrez

2 November 2022	Chihuahua	0–0	Tampico Madero	Chihuahua City, Chihuahua
20:00 CST (UTC−6)		Report		Stadium: Estadio Olímpico Universitario José Reyes Baeza; Attendance: 10,000; Referee: Adrián Chafino García

Second leg

5 November 2022	Tuzos UAZ	5–2 (7–3 agg.)	Cafetaleros de Chiapas	Zacatecas City, Zacatecas
15:30 CST (UTC−6)	Bernal 5', 40'; Torres 20', 32'; López 74'	Report	Abundis 58', 72'	Stadium: Estadio Carlos Vega Villalba; Attendance: 2,000; Referee: Mauricio Eleazar López Sánchez

5 November 2022	Tampico Madero	3–2 (3–2 agg.)	Chihuahua	Tampico and Ciudad Madero, Tamaulipas
20:00 CST (UTC−6)	Miranda 35'; Ramos 52'; Hernández 64'	Report	Gama 5'; Sartiaguin 86'	Stadium: Estadio Tamaulipas; Attendance: 13,000; Referee: Jesús Enrique Herrera Armenta

===== Final =====
The first leg was played on 10 November, and the second leg will be played on 13 November 2022.

Team 1	Agg.	Team 2	1st leg	2nd leg
Tampico Madero	2–3	Tuzos UAZ	1–3	1–0

First leg

10 November 2022	Tuzos UAZ	3–1	Tampico Madero	Zacatecas City, Zacatecas
19:00 CST (UTC−6)	Aguilar 5'; Villa 27'; Bernal 77'	Report	Miranda 13'	Stadium: Estadio Carlos Vega Villalba; Attendance: 8,000; Referee: Jesús Enrique Herrera Armenta

Second leg

13 November 2022	Tampico Madero	1–0 (2–3 agg.)	Tuzos UAZ	Tampico and Ciudad Madero, Tamaulipas
17:00 CST (UTC−6)	Ramos 69'	Report		Stadium: Estadio Tamaulipas; Attendance: 20,000; Referee: Enrique Augusto Ramírez Gutiérrez

Champions

1st title

==== Liguilla de Filiales Apertura 2022 ====
The four best reserve teams of the season play two games against each other on a home-and-away basis. The higher seeded teams play on their home field during the second leg. The winner of each match up is determined by aggregate score. In the semifinals, if the two teams are tied on aggregate the higher seeded team advances. In the final, if the two teams are tied after both legs, the match goes to extra time and, if necessary, a penalty shoot-out.

Semi-finals
1	Pachuca	4	4	8
4	Lobos ULMX	1	2	3
2	Cimarrones de Sonora	3	0	3
3	Leones Negros UdeG	0	2	2

Final
1	Pachuca	3	4	7
2	Cimarrones de Sonora	3	0	3

- Liguilla de Filiales Champion qualifies for Copa Conecta.

===== Semi-finals =====
The first legs were played on 27 October, and the second legs were played on 30 and 31 October 2022.

Team 1	Agg.	Team 2	1st leg	2nd leg
Pachuca	8–3	Lobos ULMX	4–1	4–2
Cimarrones de Sonora	3–2	Leones Negros UdeG	3–0	0–2

First leg

27 October 2022	Leones Negros UdeG	0–3	Cimarrones de Sonora	Zapopan, Jalisco
11:00 CDT (UTC−5)		Report	Reyes 1'; Solórzano 56'; Hernández 65'	Stadium: Club Deportivo U. de G. Attendance: 100; Referee: Marco Claudio Rodríguez Deras (Nayarit)

27 October 2022	Lobos ULMX	1–4	Pachuca	Celaya, Guanajuato
17:00 CDT (UTC−5)	Sosa 66'	Report	Gámez 1'; Aguayo 24'; González 45'; López 57'	Stadium: Estadio Miguel Alemán Valdés; Attendance: 200; Referee: Oscar Yahir Toledo Pineda

Second leg

30 October 2022	Cimarrones de Sonora	0–2 (3–2 agg.)	Leones Negros UdeG	Hermosillo, Sonora
15:30 MST (UTC−7)		Report	Meza 54'; Zazueta 80'	Stadium: Estadio Héroe de Nacozari; Attendance: 0 Referee: Rodrigo Ramos Romo

31 October 2022	Pachuca	4–2 (8–3 agg.)	Lobos ULMX	Pachuca, Hidalgo
12:00 CST (UTC−6)	O. González 2', 21'; Gámez 59', 83'	Report	Sosa 61'; M. González 74'	Stadium: Estadio Hidalgo; Attendance: 150; Referee: Rosario Cardenas Morales

===== Final =====
Team 1	Agg.	Team 2	1st leg	2nd leg
Pachuca	7–3	Cimarrones de Sonora	3–3	4–0

First leg

3 November 2022	Cimarrones de Sonora	3–3	Pachuca	Hermosillo, Sonora
18:00 MST (UTC−7)	S. López 5'; Ortiz 18'; Solórzano 28'	Report	González 35', 39'; Medellín 90+4'	Stadium: Estadio Héroe de Nacozari; Attendance: 379; Referee: Rodrigo Ramos Romo

Second leg

6 November 2022	Pachuca	4–0 (7–3 agg.)	Cimarrones de Sonora	Pachuca, Hidalgo
12:00 CST (UTC−6)	Martínez 8'; Esqueda 48'; Aguayo 62'; Medellín 87'	Report		Stadium: Estadio Hidalgo; Attendance: 3,400; Referee: Rosario Guadalupe Cárdenas Morales

Champions (Filiales)

1st title

== Torneo Clausura ==
The Torneo Clausura began on 6 January 2023.

=== Group 1 ===
==== Standings ====
Pos	Team	Pld	W	D	L	GF	GA	GD	BP	Pts	Qualification or relegation
1	Chihuahua	10	7	2	1	21	10	+11	2	25	Qualification to Liguilla de Ascenso
2	Tecos	10	7	2	1	14	4	+10	2	25	Qualification to Liguilla de Ascenso
3	Tritones Vallarta	10	7	1	2	17	5	+12	2	24	Qualification to Liguilla de Ascenso
4	Los Cabos United	10	5	2	3	14	8	+6	1	18	
5	Cimarrones de Sonora	10	5	2	3	16	11	+5	1	18	Qualification to Liguilla de Filiales
6	UAZ	10	5	1	4	14	12	+2	2	18	
7	Coras	10	4	1	5	9	13	−4	0	13	
8	Mineros de Fresnillo	10	3	1	6	7	16	−9	0	10	
9	Mexicali	10	2	2	6	10	18	−8	0	8	
10	Halcones de Zapopan	10	1	3	6	6	17	−11	0	6	
11	Leones Negros UdeG	10	0	1	9	4	18	−14	0	1	

Updated to match(es) played on 18 March 2023. Source: Liga Premier FMF

==== Positions by Round ====
Qualification to quarter-finals
Last place in table

Team ╲ Round	1	2	3	4	5	6	7	8	9	10	11
Chihuahua	5	2	6	7†	5	4	3	3	3	2	1
Tecos	7†	5	2	1	1	2	1	1	1	3	2
Tritones Vallarta	1	3†	5	4	3	1	2	2	2	1	3
Los Cabos	3	8	4	3	2	3	4	4	5†	4	4
Cimarrones	6	1	1	2	4	5	5	5†	6	5	5
Tuzos UAZ	2	4	3	5	6†	7	7	5	4	6	6
Coras	10	11	11†	8	9	9	9	8	7	7	7
Fresnillo	4	7	8	9	7	8†	8	9	9	9	8
Mexicali	11	6	7	6	8	6	6	7	8	8	9†
Zapopan	8	9	9	10	10	10	10†	10	10	10	10
Leones Negros	9	10	10	11	11	11	11	11	11	11†	11

Updated to match(es) played on 18 March 2023. Source: Liga Premier FMF
Notes: † indicates team rested that round

==== Results ====
Home \ Away	CHI	CIM	COR	FRE	HZP	LNU	LCU	MXL	TEC	TRV	UAZ
Chihuahua	—	—	3–1	3–1	—	—	—	—	—	2–1	3–1
Cimarrones	1–1	—	2–0	—	2–0	4–1	—	—	0–1	—	0–2
Coras	—	—	—	—	1–1	—	1–0	3–1	—	0–2	1–0
Fresnillo	—	0–1	1–0	—	—	1–0	—	—	0–2	—	1–1
Halcones de Zapopan	0–3	—	—	2–0	—	—	1–2	1–1	—	0–3	—
Leones Negros	1–2	—	1–2	—	0–0	—	0–1	—	0–2	—	1–3
Los Cabos	2–0	1–4	—	0–1	—	—	—	3–0	—	0–0	—
Mexicali	1–3	1–1	—	4–2	—	2–0	—	—	—	0–1	—
Tecos	1–1	—	2–0	—	2–0	—	1–1	1–0	—	—	1–0
Tritones Vallarta	—	4–1	—	3–0	—	1–0	—	—	2–1	—	—
UAZ	—	—	—	—	3–1	—	0–4	3–0	—	1–0	—

Updated to match(es) played on 18 March 2023. Source: Liga Premier FMF
Legend: Blue = home team win; Yellow = draw; Red = away team win.

=== Group 2 ===
==== Standings ====
Pos	Team	Pld	W	D	L	GF	GA	GD	BP	Pts	Qualification or relegation
1	Tampico Madero (C)	10	9	1	0	20	6	+14	1	29	Qualification to Liguilla de Ascenso
2	Gavilanes de Matamoros	10	6	1	3	22	11	+11	0	19	Qualification to Liguilla de Ascenso
3	Saltillo	10	4	2	4	17	16	+1	2	16	
4	Colima	10	4	2	4	18	15	+3	0	14	
5	Lobos ULMX	10	2	7	1	14	13	+1	1	14	Qualification to Liguilla de Filiales
6	La Piedad	10	4	2	4	16	17	−1	0	14	
7	UAT	10	3	2	5	18	18	0	2	13	Qualification to Liguilla de Filiales
8	Tulancingo	10	3	3	4	12	14	−2	1	13	
9	Aguacateros CDU	10	3	4	3	10	17	−7	0	13	
10	Inter Querétaro	10	1	3	6	11	19	−8	1	7	
11	Catedráticos Elite	10	2	1	7	16	28	−12	0	7	

Updated to match(es) played on 18 March 2023. Source: Liga Premier FMF
(C) Champions

==== Positions by Round ====
Qualification to quarter-finals
Last place in table

Team ╲ Round	1	2	3	4	5	6	7	8	9	10	11
Tampico Madero	2	1	1	1	1	1	1	1	1	1	1†
Gavilanes	8	2	3†	3	3	3	3	3	2	2	2
Saltillo	1	3	2	2	2	2	2†	2	3	3	3
Colima	11	4	5	9†	9	6	5	4	4	4	4
Lobos ULMX	10	8	8	6	6	4	6	5	5	6†	5
La Piedad	4	9	4	8	4	5	4	6	6†	9	6
UAT	3	7†	10	7	5	7	7	9	7	5	7
Tulancingo	5	5	6	4	7	8†	8	7	8	7	8
Aguacateros CDU	6	6	7	5	8†	9	9	8	9	8	9
Inter Querétaro	9†	10	9	10	11	11	11	11	11	10	10
Catedráticos Elite	7	11	11	11	10	10	10	10†	10	11	11

Updated to match(es) played on 18 March 2023. Source: Liga Premier FMF
Notes: † indicates team rested that round

==== Results ====
Home \ Away	ADU	CAT	COL	GAV	INQ	LPD	LUM	SAL	TAM	TUL	UAT
Aguacateros CDU	—	—	2–1	—	—	3–2	—	—	0–1	—	1–0
Catedráticos Elite	3–0	—	—	0–1	1–3	—	—	2–4	—	—	3–2
Colima	—	4–0	—	2–0	2–0	—	1–1	—	—	1–1	—
Gavilanes	7–1	—	—	—	—	4–1	0–0	4–1	1–2	—	2–1
Inter Querétaro	1–1	—	—	1–2	—	0–1	1–1	2–2	1–3	—	—
La Piedad	—	3–1	2–1	—	—	—	—	—	1–1	3–1	1–1
Lobos ULMX	0–0	3–3	—	—	—	3–2	—	2–1	—	2–2	—
Saltillo	1–1	—	3–0	—	—	2–0	—	—	1–2	1–0	1–3
Tampico Madero	—	4–1	2–1	—	—	—	1–0	—	—	1–0	3–0
Tulancingo	1–1	3–2	—	2–1	2–1	—	—	—	—	—	—
UAT	—	—	4–5	—	4–0	—	2–2	—	—	1–0	—

Updated to match(es) played on 18 March 2023. Source: Liga Premier FMF
Legend: Blue = home team win; Yellow = draw; Red = away team win.

=== Group 3 ===
==== Standings ====
Pos	Team	Pld	W	D	L	GF	GA	GD	BP	Pts	Qualification or relegation
1	Pachuca	10	7	0	3	40	8	+32	3	24	Qualification to the Liguilla de Filiales
2	Inter Playa del Carmen	10	6	3	1	21	7	+14	2	23	Qualification to the Liguilla de Ascenso
3	Cafetaleros de Chiapas	10	7	1	2	19	12	+7	0	22	Qualification to the Liguilla de Ascenso
4	Dongu	10	6	1	3	33	9	+24	2	21	Qualification to the Liguilla de Ascenso
5	Montañeses	10	6	1	3	21	11	+10	1	20	
6	Deportiva Venados	10	5	1	4	25	12	+13	2	18	
7	Escorpiones	10	4	2	4	11	11	0	1	15	
8	Sporting Canamy	10	3	2	5	22	20	+2	1	12	
9	Yalmakán	10	3	1	6	14	18	−4	0	10	
10	Leviatán	10	2	0	8	7	39	−32	1	7	
11	Real de Arteaga	10	0	0	10	1	67	−66	0	0	

Updated to match(es) played on 18 March 2023. Source: Liga Premier FMF

==== Positions by Round ====
Qualification to quarter-finals
Last place in table

Team ╲ Round	1	2	3	4	5	6	7	8	9	10	11
Pachuca	1	4†	2	1	1	1	1	1	1	2	1
Inter Playa	2	1	1	2	5	2	3†	3	3	1	2
Cafetaleros	11	5	4	3	2	3†	2	2	2	4	3
Dongu	10	6	9	9	7	6	4	4	6	5	4
Montañeses	6†	8	5	4	3	4	6	5	4	3	5
Deportiva Venados	9	10	7	7	8	7	5	7	5	6	6†
Escorpiones	4	2	3	6	4	5	7	8	8†	7	7
Sporting Canamy	8	7	8	8	9†	9	8	6	7	8	8
Yalmakán	3	3	6	5	6	8	9	9†	9	9	9
Leviatán	5	9	10†	10	10	10	10	10	10	10	10
Real de Arteaga	7	11	11	11	11	11	11	11	11	11†	11

Updated to match(es) played on 18 March 2023. Source: Liga Premier FMF
Notes: † indicates team rested that round

==== Results ====
Home \ Away	CAF	DVE	DON	ESC	INP	LEV	MON	PAC	RAT	SCA	YAL
Cafetaleros	—	—	—	—	1–0	2–0	2–1	—	6–0	3–2	3–2
Deportiva Venados	2–0	—	0–1	—	—	—	—	2–1	8–0	—	1–2
Dongu	1–2	—	—	—	1–2	9–0	1–2	—	13–0	—	2–1
Escorpiones	0–0	3–1	0–1	—	—	—	—	0–4	—	—	1–0
Inter Playa	—	2–2	—	1–1	—	—	3–2	2–0	8–0	—	—
Leviatán	—	0–5	—	1–4	0–2	—	—	0–8	—	4–3	—
Montañeses	—	1–0	—	1–0	—	4–0	—	—	—	2–0	—
Pachuca	4–0	—	0–2	—	—	—	4–1	—	8–0	—	8–1
Real de Arteaga	—	—	—	0–1	—	0–2	1–7	—	—	0–9	—
Sporting Canamy	—	2–4	2–2	2–1	0–0	—	—	0–3	—	—	—
Yalmakán	—	—	—	—	0–1	2–0	0–0	—	5–0	1–2	—

Updated to match(es) played on 18 March 2023. Source: Liga Premier FMF
Legend: Blue = home team win; Yellow = draw; Red = away team win.

=== Regular season statistics ===
==== Top goalscorers ====
Players sorted first by goals scored, then by last name.

Rank	Player	Club	Goals
1	(Mexico) Eduardo Mustre	Pachuca	11
2	(Mexico) Edwin Mendoza	Sporting Canamy	10
3	(Mexico) Owen González	Pachuca	9
3	(Mexico) Eleuterio Jiménez	Cafetaleros de Chiapas	9
3	(Mexico) Carlo Vázquez	Montañeses	9
6	(Mexico) Carlos García	Dongu	8
7	(Mexico) Diego Gama	Chihuahua	6
7	(Mexico) Juan Carlos Martínez	Dongu	6
7	(Ecuador) Santiago Micolta	Deportiva Venados	6
7	(Mexico) Diego Núñez	Catedráticos Elite	6
7	(Mexico) Daniel Rojas	Dongu	6
7	(Colombia) Andrés Suárez	Gavilanes de Matamoros	6

Source:Liga Premier FMF

==== Hat-tricks ====
Player	For	Against	Result	Date	Round	Reference
(Mexico) Lucio Carmona	Inter Playa del Carmen	Real de Arteaga	8 – 0 (H)	13 January 2023	2	
(Mexico) Carlo Vázquez	Montañeses	Real de Arteaga	1 – 7 (A)	29 January 2023	4	
(Mexico) Owen González	Pachuca	Real de Arteaga	8 – 0 (H)	3 February 2023	5	
(Ecuador) Santiago Micolta	Deportiva Venados	Leviatán	0 – 5 (A)	17 February 2023	7	
(Mexico) Carlos García	Dongu	Real de Arteaga	13 – 0 (H)	18 February 2023	7	
(Mexico) Edwin Mendoza	Sporting Canamy	Real de Arteaga	0 – 9 (A)	26 February 2023	8	
(Mexico) Eduardo Mustre	Pachuca	Leviatán	0 – 8 (A)	3 March 2023	9	
(Colombia) Duvier Mosquera	Coras	Mexicali	3 - 1 (H)	10 March 2023	10	
(Mexico) Víctor Argumedo	Los Cabos United	UAZ	0 – 4 (A)	13 March 2023	10	
(Mexico) Edgar Ayala	Yalmakán	Real de Arteaga	5 – 0 (H)	18 March 2023	11	
(Mexico) Carlos García	Dongu	Leviatán	9 – 0 (H)	18 March 2023	11	
(Mexico) Juan Martínez	Dongu	Leviatán	9 – 0 (H)	18 March 2023	11	

(H) – Home; (A) – Away

=== Attendance ===
==== Per team ====
Pos	Team	Total	High	Low	Average	Change
1	Tampico Madero	61,000	16,000	8,000	12,200	+90.6%
2	Chihuahua	18,515	5,000	4,315	4,629	−35.4%
3	Gavilanes de Matamoros	21,500	10,000	500	3,583	+616.6%
4	Montañeses	10,400	4,500	300	2,600	+300.0%
5	Cafetaleros de Chiapas	8,490	3,500	450	1,570	+76.4%
6	La Piedad	6,300	2,000	1,000	1,260	−67.8%
7	Los Cabos United	5,000	2,500	400	1,000	−2.0%
8	Aguacateros CDU	2,900	1,000	400	725	+11.5%
9	Inter Playa del Carmen	2,900	1,000	300	580	+87.1%
10	Tritones Vallarta	1,950	500	450	488	+74.3%
11	Tecos	2,900	1,000	200	483	+102.9%
12	Saltillo	2,500	500	300	417	−79.8%
13	Colima	1,700	500	200	340	+65.0%
14	Mexicali	1,665	610	100	333	−38.3%
15	UAZ	1,150	350	200	288	+92.0%
16	Coras	1,400	400	100	280	−6.7%
17	Catedráticos Elite	1,100	500	50	275	+175.0%
18	Inter Querétaro	1,500	300	100	250	+77.3%
19	Yalmakán	1,200	400	200	240	−25.0%
20	UAT	860	200	60	215	+68.0%
21	Escorpiones	1,016	303	100	203	+1.5%
22	Lobos ULMX	850	350	100	170	−41.6%
23	Tulancingo	650	200	100	163	+14.8%
24	Dongu	950	200	100	158	−21.0%
25	Fresnillo	750	500	50	150	+70.5%
26	Cimarrones de Sonora	250	200	50	125	+66.7%^{1}
27	Halcones de Zapopan	600	200	50	120	−7.7%
28	Pachuca	600	200	50	120	−50.0%
29	Deportiva Venados	600	200	50	120	−7.7%
30	Leviatán	575	200	75	115	+4.5%^{2}
31	Sporting Canamy	450	150	50	90	−35.7%
32	Leones Negros	520	100	50	87	+16.0%
33	Real de Arteaga	250	100	50	83	−64.4%
	League total	163,921	16,000	50	1,025	+14.5%

Source: Liga Premier FMF
Notes:
Only regular season listed
1: Cimarrones de Sonora played 3 matches behind closed doors.
2: Leviatán played one match at Estadio Municipal Claudio Suárez, Texcoco

==== Highest and lowest ====
Highest attended					Lowest attended			
Week	Home	Score	Away	Attendance	Home	Score	Away	Attendance
1	Tampico Madero	1–0	Lobos ULMX	15,000	Mineros de Fresnillo	1–0	Leones Negros	50
2	Chihuahua	3–1	Coras	4,315	Sporting Canamy	2–2	Dongu	50
3	Tampico Madero	3–0	UAT	16,000	Mineros de Fresnillo	0–2	Tecos	50
4	Gavilanes de Matamoros	1–2	Tampico Madero	10,000	UAT	4–0	Inter Querétaro	60
5	Tampico Madero	2–1	Colima	10,000	Halcones de Zapopan	0–3	Tritones Vallarta	50
6	Chihuahua	3–1	UAZ	5,000	Real de Arteaga	0–2	Leviatán	50
7	Tampico Madero	1–0	Tulancingo	8,000	Sporting Canamy	2–1	Escorpiones	50
8	Montañeses	4–0	Leviatán	4,500	Deportiva Venados	0–1	Dongu	50
9	Tampico Madero	4–1	Catedráticos Elite	12,000	Mexicali	0–1	Tritones Vallarta	100
10	Montañeses	2–0	Sporting Canamy	4,500	Catedráticos Elite	1–4	Inter Querétaro	50
11	Chihuahua	2–1	Tritones Vallarta	4,700	Leones Negros	1–3	UAZ	50

Source: Liga Premier FMF

1. Does not include matches played behind closed doors.

=== Liguilla ===
==== Liguilla de Ascenso ====
The two best teams and the two best third places of each group play two games against each other on a home-and-away basis. The higher seeded teams play on their home field during the second leg. The winner of each match up is determined by aggregate score. In the quarterfinals and semifinals, if the two teams are tied on aggregate the higher seeded team advances. In the final, if the two teams are tied after both legs, the match goes to extra time and, if necessary, a penalty shoot-out.

Quarter-finals
1	Tampico Madero (s)	0	1	1
10	Gavilanes de Matamoros	0	1	1
3	Tecos	0	1	1
7	Cafetaleros de Chiapas	1	1	2
2	Chihuahua	1	2	3
8	Dongu	0	1	1
5	Tritones Vallarta	0	1	1
6	Inter Playa del Carmen	1	1	2

Semi-finals
1	Tampico Madero	0	2	2
7	Cafetaleros de Chiapas	1	0	1
2	Chihuahua	1	0	1
6	Inter Playa del Carmen	1	2	3

Final
1	Tampico Madero (p.)	2	2	4 (4)
6	Inter Playa del Carmen	2	2	4 (2)

===== Quarter-finals =====
The first legs were played on 24 and 25 March, and the second legs were played on 31 March and 1 April 2023.

Team 1	Agg.	Team 2	1st leg	2nd leg
Tampico Madero	s 1–1	Gavilanes de Matamoros	0–0	1–1
Chihuahua	3–1	Dongu	1–0	2–1
Tecos	1–2	Cafetaleros de Chiapas	0–1	1–1
Tritones Vallarta	1–2	Inter Playa del Carmen	0–1	1–1

First leg

24 March 2023	Inter Playa del Carmen	1–0	Tritones Vallarta	Playa del Carmen, Quintana Roo
18:00 EST (UTC−5)	Cruz 36'	Report		Stadium: Unidad Deportiva Mario Villanueva; Attendance: 3,000; Referee: Alan Vladimir Robles Bernal

25 March 2023	Dongu	0–1	Chihuahua	Cuautitlán, State of Mexico
16:00 CST (UTC−6)		Report	Gama 26'	Stadium: Estadio Los Pinos; Attendance: 150; Referee: Yair Ugalde Rivera

25 March 2023	Cafetaleros de Chiapas	1–0	Tecos	Tuxtla Gutiérrez, Chiapas
16:30 CST (UTC−6)	García 9'	Report		Stadium: Estadio Víctor Manuel Reyna; Attendance: 1,380; Referee: Jonathan Arturo Betancourt Galindo

25 March 2023	Gavilanes de Matamoros	0–0	Tampico Madero	Matamoros, Tamaulipas
17:00 CDT (UTC−5)		Report		Stadium: Estadio El Hogar; Attendance: 7,500; Referee: Diego Gilberto Gurrea Mendoza

Second leg

31 March 2023	Tecos	1–1 (1–2 agg.)	Cafetaleros de Chiapas	Zapopan, Jalisco
19:00 CST (UTC−6)	Rodríguez 3'	Report	Patjane 90+4'	Stadium: Estadio Tres de Marzo; Attendance: 1,000; Referee: Julio César Gil Jiménez

31 March 2023	Chihuahua	2–1 (3–1 agg.)	Dongu	Chihuahua City, Chihuahua
20:00 CST (UTC−6)	Coronel 28'; Gama 55'	Report	Vázquez 54'	Stadium: Estadio Olímpico Universitario José Reyes Baeza; Attendance: 7,000; Referee: Alan Cristóbal Rodríguez Cancino

1 April 2023	Tritones Vallarta	1–1 (1–2 agg.)	Inter Playa del Carmen	San José del Valle, Nayarit
16:00 CST (UTC−6)	Barajas 45+2' (pen.)	Report	Cruz 80'	Stadium: Ciudad Deportiva San José del Valle; Attendance: 500; Referee: Mauricio Eleazar López Sánchez

1 April 2023	Tampico Madero	1–1 (1–1 agg.)	Gavilanes de Matamoros	Tampico and Ciudad Madero, Tamaulipas
20:00 CST (UTC−6)	Aquino 37'	Report	Castañeda 88'	Stadium: Estadio Tamaulipas; Attendance: 10,000; Referee: Enrique Augusto Ramírez Gutiérrez

===== Semi-finals =====
The first legs were played on 7 and 9 April, and the second legs were played on 14 and 15 April 2023.

Team 1	Agg.	Team 2	1st leg	2nd leg
Tampico Madero	2–1	Cafetaleros de Chiapas	0–1	2–0
Chihuahua	1–3	Inter Playa del Carmen	1–1	0–2

First leg

7 April 2023	Inter Playa del Carmen	1–1	Chihuahua	Playa del Carmen, Quintana Roo
18:00 EST (UTC−5)	Celada 24'	Report	Ruiz 45+1' (pen.)	Stadium: Unidad Deportiva Mario Villanueva; Attendance: 2,100; Referee: Diego Gilberto Gurrea Mendoza

9 April 2023	Cafetaleros de Chiapas	1–0	Tampico Madero	Tuxtla Gutiérrez, Chiapas
18:00 CST (UTC−6)	Jiménez 57'	Report		Stadium: Estadio Víctor Manuel Reyna; Attendance: 6,107; Referee: Rosario Guadalupe Cárdenas Morales

Second leg

14 April 2023	Chihuahua	0–2 (1–3 agg.)	Inter Playa del Carmen	Chihuahua City, Chihuahua
20:00 CST (UTC−6)		Report	Jiménez 45+1'; Celada 59'	Stadium: Estadio Olímpico Universitario José Reyes Baeza; Attendance: 9,800; Referee: Enrique Augusto Ramírez Gutiérrez

15 April 2023	Tampico Madero	2–0 (2–1 agg.)	Cafetaleros de Chiapas	Tampico and Ciudad Madero, Tamaulipas
20:00 CST (UTC−6)	Vázquez 78'; García 83'	Report		Stadium: Estadio Tamaulipas; Attendance: 10,197; Referee: Mauricio Eleazar López Sánchez

===== Final =====
The first leg was played on 21 April, and the second leg was played on 29 April 2023.

Team 1	Agg.	Team 2	1st leg	2nd leg
Tampico Madero	(p.) 4–4 (4–2)	Inter Playa del Carmen	2–2	2–2

First leg

21 April 2023	Inter Playa del Carmen	2–2	Tampico Madero	Playa del Carmen, Quintana Roo
18:00 EST (UTC−5)	Valanta 52', 65'	Report	Domínguez 17'; Aquino 36'	Stadium: Unidad Deportiva Mario Villanueva; Attendance: 7,000; Referee: Rosario Guadalupe Cárdenas Morales

Second leg

29 April 2023	Tampico Madero	2–2 (a.e.t.) (4–4 agg.) (4–2 p)	Inter Playa del Carmen	Tampico and Ciudad Madero, Tamaulipas
20:00 CST (UTC−6)	Vázquez 1'; Ramos 56'	Report	A. González 3'; Jiménez 83' (pen.)	Stadium: Estadio Tamaulipas; Attendance: 20,000; Referee: Enrique Ramírez Gutiérrez
	Penalties
	Rivera (penalty missed); Martínez (penalty scored); Castillo (penalty scored); Oteo (penalty scored); Vázquez (penalty scored)		J. Sánchez (penalty scored); Hernández (penalty missed); Cruz (penalty scored); Montano (penalty missed)

Champions

3rd title

==== Liguilla de Filiales Clausura 2023 ====
The four best reserve teams of the season play two games against each other on a home-and-away basis. The higher seeded teams play on their home field during the second leg. The winner of each match up is determined by aggregate score. In the semifinals, if the two teams are tied on aggregate the higher seeded team advances. In the final, if the two teams are tied after both legs, the match goes to extra time and, if necessary, a penalty shoot-out.

Semifinals
1	Pachuca	0	4	4
4	UAT	1	1	2
2	Cimarrones de Sonora	0	1	1
3	Lobos ULMX	1	1	2

Finals
1	Pachuca (a.e.t.)	2	2	4
3	Lobos ULMX	0	2	2

===== Semi-finals =====
The first legs were played on 25 and 26 March, and the second legs were played on 1 and 2 April 2023.

Team 1	Agg.	Team 2	1st leg	2nd leg
Pachuca	4–2	UAT	0–1	4–1
Cimarrones de Sonora	1–2	Lobos ULMX	0–1	1–1

First leg

25 March 2023	UAT	1–0	Pachuca	Ciudad Victoria, Tamaulipas
10:00 CST (UTC−6)	Eguía 36'	Report		Stadium: Estadio Profesor Eugenio Alvizo Porras; Attendance: 500; Referee: Juan Jesús Selvera Parada

26 March 2023	Lobos ULMX	1–0	Cimarrones de Sonora	Celaya, Guanajuato
16:00 CST (UTC−6)	Vázquez 22'	Report		Stadium: Estadio Miguel Alemán Valdés; Attendance: 350; Referee: Jorge Alfonso Resendiz Espinoza

Second leg

1 April 2023	Cimarrones de Sonora	1–1 (1–2 agg.)	Lobos ULMX	Hermosillo, Sonora
10:00 MST (UTC−7)	Bernal 45'	Report	Rodea 25'	Stadium: Estadio Héroe de Nacozari; Attendance: 100; Referee: Rodrigo Ramos Romo

2 April 2023	Pachuca	4–1 (4–2 agg.)	UAT	Pachuca, Hidalgo
12:00 CST (UTC−6)	Medellín 51', 85'; Mustre 55'; González 80'	Report	Banda 62'	Stadium: Estadio Hidalgo; Attendance: 1,500; Referee: Carlos Jesús Gaytán Durán

===== Final =====
The first leg was played on 9 April, and the second leg was played on 16 April 2023.

Team 1	Agg.	Team 2	1st leg	2nd leg
Pachuca	(a.e.t.) 4–2	Lobos ULMX	2–0	2–2

First leg

9 April 2023	Lobos ULMX	0–2	Pachuca	Celaya, Guanajuato
16:00 CST (UTC−6)		Report	Monreal 45+1'; González 61'	Stadium: Estadio Miguel Alemán Valdés; Attendance: 1,200; Referee: Jonathan Arturo Betancourt Galindo

Second leg

16 April 2023	Pachuca	2–2 (a.e.t.) (4–2 agg.)	Lobos ULMX	Pachuca, Hidalgo
19:00 CST (UTC−6)	Berlanga 92'; Aguayo 119'	Report	González 2'; Rodea 71'	Stadium: Estadio Hidalgo; Attendance: 8,000; Referee: Fernando Alexander Cruz Garatachea

Champions (Filiales)

2nd title

== Coefficient table ==
P	Team	Pts	G	Pts/G	GD
1	Tampico Madero	59	20	2.950	+30
2	Pachuca	54	20	2.700	+53
3	Chihuahua	46	20	2.300	+22
4	Cafetaleros de Chiapas	46	20	2.300	+19
5	Tritones Vallarta	45	20	2.250	+18
6	Tuzos UAZ	43	20	2.150	+19
7	Los Cabos United	43	20	1.950	+16
8	Inter Playa del Carmen	38	20	1.900	+16
9	Gavilanes de Matamoros	37	20	1.850	+16
10	La Piedad	37	20	1.850	+12
11	Montañeses	36	20	1.800	+6
12	Saltillo	35	20	1.750	+5
13	Tecos	35	20	1.750	+3
14	Dongu	34	20	1.700	+23
15	Deportiva Venados	33	20	1.650	+10
16	Aguacateros CDU	33	20	1.650	+7
17	Colima	31	20	1.550	+9
18	Cimarrones de Sonora	33	20	1.650	–1
19	Sporting Canamy	29	20	1.450	+9
20	Lobos ULMX	28	20	1.400	–5
21	Escorpiones	26	20	1.300	–6
22	Coras	25	20	1.250	–4
23	Yalmakán	25	20	1.250	–9
24	UAT	23	20	1.150	–6
25	Mineros de Fresnillo	20	20	1.000	–7
26	Tulancingo	19	20	0.950	–11
27	Halcones de Zapopan	17	20	0.850	–16
28	Leones Negros UdeG	15	20	0.750	–14
29	Real de Arteaga	13	20	0.650	–71
30	Inter de Querétaro	12	20	0.600	–28
31	Catedráticos Elite	10	20	0.500	–28
32	Mexicali	9	20	0.450	–38
33	Leviatán	9	20	0.450	–50

Last updated: March 18, 2023
Source: Liga Premier FMF
P = Position; G = Games played; Pts = Points; Pts/G = Ratio of points to games played; GD = Goal difference

== Campeón de Campeones Final ==
The Campeón de Campeones Final are a two-legged super cup matches between the champions of the Apertura and Clausura tournaments, to determine the winning team of the promotion to Liga de Expansión MX, as long as the winning team meets the league requirements.

The first leg was played on 6 May 2023, and the second leg was played on 13 May 2023.

Team 1	Agg.	Team 2	1st leg	2nd leg
Tampico Madero	1–0	Tuzos UAZ	0–0 (Note: The match was stopped at minute 84 due to violent incidents, 20 minutes later it was suspended with the score 0–0. On May 9, 2023 the score was made official.)	1–0

First leg

6 May 2023
20:00 CST (UTC−6)

Tuzos UAZ	0–0	Tampico Madero
	Report

Estadio Carlos Vega Villalba, Zacatecas City, Zacatecas
Attendance: 13,000
Referee: Diego Gilberto Gurrea Mendoza

Tuzos UAZ	Tampico Madero

1	GK	(Mexico) Rodrigo Ortega
3	DF	(Mexico) César Huerta
13	DF	(Mexico) Jovani Sandoval
21	DF	(Mexico) Aldo Aguilar
23	DF	(Mexico) Jesús García
7	MF	(Mexico) José Pinedo
8	MF	(Mexico) Sergio Flores
10	MF	(Mexico) Denilson Villa
17	MF	(Mexico) Alfonso Torres	(yellow card) 81'
18	FW	(Mexico) Jared Torres
30	FW	(Mexico) Damián Hernández		(substituted off) 69'
Substitutions:
20	GK	(Mexico) Christian Martínez
4	DF	(Mexico) Sebastián Madrid
14	MF	(Mexico) Mario Goytia
15	MF	(Mexico) Braulio Rodríguez
52	MF	(Mexico) José Raudales
78	MF	(Mexico) Juan Santamaría
87	MF	(Mexico) Mauricio González
9	FW	(Mexico) Emiliano Ruvalcaba		(substituted on) 69'
19	FW	(Mexico) Carlos López
22	FW	(Mexico) José Díaz
Manager:
(Mexico) Rubén Hernández

18	GK	(Mexico) Marco Millán
32	DF	(Mexico) Josué Hernández
21	DF	(Mexico) David Oteo
3	DF	(Mexico) Emmanuel Rivera
7	MF	(Mexico) José Vázquez	(yellow card) 31'
6	MF	(Mexico) Jesús Moreno	(yellow card) 58'
8	MF	(Mexico) Benjamín Muñoz		(substituted off) 65'
16	MF	(Mexico) Rubén Domínguez
11	FW	(Mexico) Áxel García	(yellow card) 75'
10	FW	(Mexico) Alan Ramos		(substituted off) 62'
20	FW	(Mexico) Esteban Torres
Substitutions:
12	GK	(Mexico) Alan Flores
2	DF	(Mexico) Jaime González
4	DF	(Mexico) Anwar Hernández
5	DF	(Mexico) Jorge Alvear
24	DF	(Mexico) Jesús Hernández
13	MF	(Mexico) Luis Castillo		(substituted on) 65'
19	MF	(Mexico) Francisco Martínez
23	FW	(Mexico) Jesús Vázquez
26	FW	(Mexico) Alberto García
27	FW	(Paraguay) Luis Aquino		(substituted on) 62'
Manager:
(Mexico) Gastón Obledo

Second leg

14 May 2023
16:00 CST (UTC−6)

Tampico Madero	1–0	Tuzos UAZ
Rivera 82'	Report

Estadio Tamaulipas, Tampico and Ciudad Madero, Tamaulipas
Attendance: 22,000
Referee: Mauricio Eleazar López Sánchez

Tampico Madero	Tuzos UAZ

18	GK	(Mexico) Marco Millán
3	DF	(Mexico) Emmanuel Rivera	(yellow card) 48'
21	DF	(Mexico) David Oteo
32	DF	(Mexico) Josué Hernández	(yellow card) 42'	(substituted off) 66'
6	MF	(Mexico) Jesús Moreno
7	MF	(Mexico) José Vázquez		(substituted off) 57'
8	MF	(Mexico) Benjamín Muñoz
16	MF	(Mexico) Rubén Domínguez
9	FW	(Mexico) Abraham Vázquez		(substituted off) 84'
10	FW	(Mexico) Alan Ramos		(substituted off) 66'
11	FW	(Mexico) Axel García		(substituted off) 84'
Substitutions:
12	GK	(Mexico) Alan Flores
4	DF	(Mexico) Anwar Hernández
24	DF	(Mexico) Jesús Hernández		(substituted on) 66'
13	MF	(Mexico) Luis Castillo
19	MF	(Mexico) Francisco Martínez		(substituted on) 57'
33	MF	(Mexico) Abel Ramos		(substituted on) 84'
20	FW	(Mexico) Esteban Torres		(substituted on) 66'
23	FW	(Mexico) Jesús Vázquez
26	FW	(Mexico) Alberto García
27	FW	(Paraguay) Luis Aquino		(substituted on) 84'
Manager:
(Mexico) Gastón Obledo

1	GK	(Mexico) Rodrigo Huerta
3	DF	(Mexico) César Hinojosa
13	DF	(Mexico) Jovani Sandoval	(yellow card) 23'
21	DF	(Mexico) Aldo Aguilar
23	DF	(Mexico) Carlos García
7	MF	(Mexico) José Pinedo
8	MF	(Mexico) Sergio Flores		(substituted off) 85'
10	MF	(Mexico) Denilson Villa
17	MF	(Mexico) Alfonso Torres
18	FW	(Mexico) Jared Torres
30	FW	(Mexico) Damián Hernández	(yellow card) 13' (yellow-red card) 49'
Substitutions:
20	GK	(Mexico) Christian Martínez
4	DF	(Mexico) Sebastián Madrid
14	MF	(Mexico) Mario Goytia
15	MF	(Mexico) Braulio Rodríguez
52	MF	(Mexico) José Raudales		(substituted on) 85'
72	MF	(Mexico) José Félix
87	MF	(Mexico) Mauricio González
9	FW	(Mexico) Emiliano Ruvalcaba
19	FW	(Mexico) Carlos López
22	FW	(Mexico) José Díaz
Manager:
(Mexico) Rubén Hernández

Champions

2nd title

== See also ==
- 2022–23 Liga MX season
- 2022–23 Liga de Expansión MX season
- 2022–23 Serie B de México season
- 2022–23 Liga TDP season
- 2023 Copa Conecta
