= Sergio Hernández (footballer, born 2002) =

Mexican footballer

Personal information
- Full name: Sergio Adrián Hernández Hernández
- Date of birth: 18 September 2002 (age 24)
- Place of birth: Gómez Palacio, Durango, Mexico
- Height: 1.80 m (5 ft 11 in)
- Position: Forward

Team information
- Current team: UdeG (on loan from Pachuca)
- Number: 34

Youth career
- Allianza Fútbol
- Pachuca

Senior career*
Years	Team	Apps	(Gls)
2022	Pachuca B	7	(0)
2023–	Pachuca	18	(2)
2023	→ Atlante (loan)	3	(0)
2025	→ Everton de Viña del Mar (loan)	5	(1)
2026–	→ UdeG (loan)	0	(0)

International career^{‡}
2024	Mexico U23	1	(0)
- * Club domestic league appearances and goals as of 31 December 2025 ‡ National team caps and goals as of 12 August 2025

Sergio Adrián Hernández Hernández (born 18 September 2002) is a Mexican professional footballer who plays as a forward for Liga de Expansión MX club UdeG, on loan from Liga MX club Pachuca.

== Club career ==
Born in Gómez Palacio, Mexico, Hernández was trained at Allianza Fútbol in the United States before joining the Pachuca youth system. After making appearances for the B-team in the 2022–23 Serie A de México, he was loaned out to Atlante in the 2023 Clausura of the Liga de Expansión.

Back to Pachuca, Hernández made his debut with the first team in the 2–0 win against Atlético San Luis on 17 July 2024 for the Liga MX and scored his first goal in the 2–2 draw against Toluca on 18 September of the same year. He also made appearances at the 2024 FIFA Intercontinental Cup in the matches against Botafogo and Real Madrid.

In the second half of 2025, Hernández moved on loan to Everton de Viña del Mar in the Chilean Primera División.

In February 2026, Hernández moved on loan to Leones Negros UdeG in the Liga de Expansión MX.

== International career ==
Hernández represented the Mexico under-23 team in the 1–0 away loss against Netherlands U21 on 10 October 2024.
