= Eduardo Mustre =

Mexican footballer (born 2003)

Personal information
- Full name: Eduardo Mustre Torres
- Date of birth: 21 January 2003 (age 23)
- Place of birth: Córdoba, Veracruz, Mexico
- Height: 1.76 m (5 ft 9 in)
- Position: Forward

Team information
- Current team: Puebla
- Number: 29

Youth career
- 2018–2023: Pachuca
- 2025–2026: Puebla

College career
Years	Team	Apps	(Gls)
2023–2025	FIU Panthers	44	(22)

Senior career*
Years	Team	Apps	(Gls)
2020–2023	Pachuca	1	(0)
2023	→ Pachuca Premier	11	(12)
2026–	Puebla	17	(3)

International career^{‡}
2021	Mexico U20	2	(0)
- * Club domestic league appearances and goals as of 20 November 2026 ‡ National team caps and goals as of 6 September 2026

Eduardo Mustre Torres (born 21 January 2003) is a Mexican professional footballer who plays as a forward for Liga MX club Puebla.

== Early life ==
Mustre was born on 21 January 2003 in Córdoba, Veracruz, Mexico. He is the son of Eduardo Mustre and Laura Torres, and has a sister named Sofia.

Mustre began playing tennis at an early age, winning several medals at national competitions and representing Mexico at the U14 Tennis World Cup in Prostějov, Czech Republic, before switching to football.

== Club career ==
Mustre began his football career at the academy of Pachuca. After scoring 12 goals in 15 games for the club's under-20 team, he made his first-team debut on 7 November 2020 in a 1–0 away defeat to Necaxa, coming on as a substitute in the 79th minute. He subsequently continued to play primarily for Pachuca's youth teams and Pachuca Premier.

In 2023, Mustre moved to the United States to attend Florida International University, where he studied international relations and played for the university's soccer team in NCAA Division I. During his time at FIU, he made 44 appearances, scoring 22 goals and providing three assists.

On 25 December 2025, Mustre returned to Mexico and signed with Puebla. After making limited appearances during the first six months at the club, he established himself as a starter during the Apertura 2026.

== Career statistics ==
=== Club ===
As of match played 20 November 2026

Club	Season	League			National cup		Other		Total	
Club	Season	Division	Apps	Goals	Apps	Goals	Apps	Goals	Apps	Goals
Pachuca	2020–21	Liga MX	1	0	—		—		1	0
Pachuca Premier (loan)	2022–23	Serie A de México	11	12	—		—		11	12
Puebla	2025–26	Liga MX	5	0	—		—		5	0
Puebla	2026–27	Liga MX	12	3	—		2 (Note: Appearances in Leagues Cup)	2	14	5
Puebla	Total		17	3	0	0	2	2	19	5
Career total			29	15	0	0	2	2	31	17
