= Pablo Robles =

Mexican footballer and manager (born 1968)

Personal information
- Full name: Pablo Andrés Robles Hatadi
- Date of birth: 21 March 1968 (age 58)
- Place of birth: Mexico City
- Height: 1.77 m (5 ft 9 1/2 in)
- Position: Defender

Team information
- Current team: Héroes de Zaci B (head coach)

Senior career*
Years	Team	Apps	(Gls)
1991–1992	Atlante	10	(0)
1993–1994	Querétaro	16	(0)

Managerial career
- 2009–2011: Atlante Reserves and Academy
- 2012–2013: América Reserves and Academy
- 2013–2014: Promesas de Altamira
- 2015: Jardon Fut Soccer
- 2015–2016: Deportivo Nuevo Chimalhuacán
- 2016: Lobos BUAP Premier
- 2017–2019: Deportivo Nuevo Chimalhuacán
- 2019: Deportivo Petapa
- 2019–2021: Ciervos
- 2022: Ciervos
- 2022: Real de Arteaga
- 2023: Tulancingo (Assistant)
- 2024–2026: Valle de Xico
- 2026–: Héroes de Zaci B
- * Club domestic league appearances and goals

Pablo Andrés Robles Hatadi (born March 21, 1968) is a Mexican football manager and former player.
