= Leviatán F.C. =

- Full name: Leviatán Fútbol Club
- Nickname(s): La bestia
- Founded: November 2020; 4 years ago
- Dissolved: 7 June 2023; 2 years ago
- Ground: Estadio Jesús Martínez "Palillo"; Mexico City
- Capacity: 6,000
- Owner: Víctor Valdivia; Darío Scherer; Samuel Rodríguez; Iván Hernández; Juan Carlos Ramírez
- Chairman: Cristian Tietze
- Manager: Vacant
- League: Liga Premier – Serie A
- Clausura 2023: 10th, Group III
- Website: http://www.somosleviatan.com/
Home colours	Away colours

Leviatán Fútbol Club is a football club that plays in the Liga Premier de México – Serie A. It is based in Mexico City.

== History ==
The team was founded in November 2020 when a group of five entrepreneurs who had previously managed the Club Mayas in the Liga TDP decided to start a franchise that would compete in the Liga Premier de México.

In July the team announced Miguel Salas as their first manager, in addition to the use of the Estadio Neza 86 as the setting for their home games. The team was officially entered into soccer competitions on July 30, 2021, when its entry into the Liga Premier – Serie A was announced, the club was placed in Group 2 of this category.

The team officially debuted on September 19, 2021 with a 1–3 loss against C.F. La Piedad. Levatián F.C. got their first win on October 13 when they defeated Escorpiones F.C. by 3–4.

In January 2023, the team became famous internationally because they played the match against Cafetaleros de Chiapas with fake Inter Milan kits. The club's board argued the theft of their uniforms as the reason for the use of those clothes, however, it was later revealed that the problem was a consequence of the club's financial and institutional problems.

On June 7, 2023 the team was suspended from the 2023–24 Liga Premier season for failing to fulfill the obligations as an affiliate.

== Stadium ==
Leviatán F.C. plays the home matches at Estadio Jesús Martínez "Palillo", a multi-use stadium located in the Magdalena Mixhuca Sports City in Mexico City. The stadium has a capacity of 6,000 people.

Occasionally the team also plays in the Estadio Neza 86, a football stadium in Ciudad Nezahualcóyotl, a commuter town located east of Mexico City in the State of Mexico. The stadium is located on the grounds of the main campus of the Universidad Tecnológica de Nezahualcóyotl. It has a capacity of 20,000 people.

== Players ==
As of January 6, 2023

=== Current squad ===
Note: Flags indicate national team as defined under FIFA eligibility rules; some limited exceptions apply. Players may hold more than one non-FIFA nationality.

No.	Pos.	Nation	Player

== Managers ==
- (Mexico) Miguel Salas (2021)
- (Mexico) Jaime Cruz (2021–2022)
- (Mexico) José Alberto Pérez (2022)
- (Mexico) Héctor Anguiano (2022)
- (Mexico) Carlos Valdez (2023)
