= Reinaldo Lima =

Brazilian football manager and former player

Personal information
- Full name: Reinaldo Lima Siqueira
- Date of birth: 18 September 1981 (age 45)
- Place of birth: Minas Gerais, Brazil
- Position: Defender

Team information
- Current team: América U-23 (Assistant)

Senior career*
Years	Team	Apps	(Gls)
2005–2006	Durango	15	(2)

Managerial career
- 2008–2011: Durango
- 2011: Ciudad Juárez
- 2013–2016: Tigres UANL Reserves and Academy
- 2016–2017: UAZ
- 2017–2018: Necaxa Reserves and Academy
- 2024–: América Reserves and Academy
- * Club domestic league appearances and goals

Reinaldo Lima Siqueira (born September 18, 1981) is a Brazilian football manager and former player.
