= Estadio Neza 86 =

Stadium in Ciudad Nezahualcóyotl, Mexico

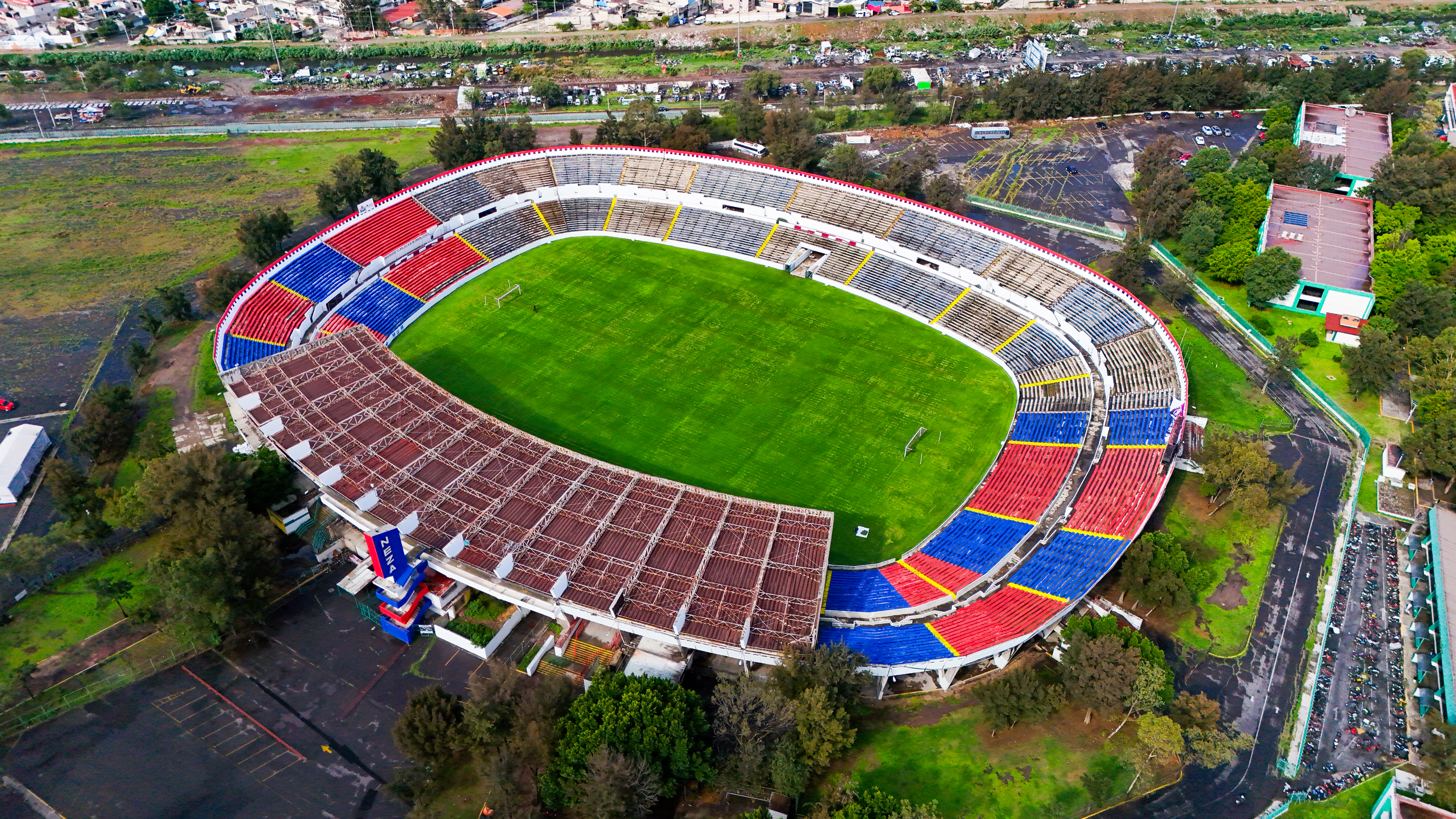
- Interactive map of Estadio Neza 86
- Location: Av. Lázaro Cárdenas Ciudad Nezahualcóyotl, Mexico State C.P. 57000
- Coordinates: 19°24′21″N 98°59′13″W
- Operator: Technological University of Nezahualcóyotl
- Capacity: 20,000
- Surface: Grass
- Field size: 105 x 68 m

Construction
- Opened: 1981

Tenants
- Deportivo Neza (1981–1988); Potros Neza (1988–89); CF Atlante (2002–2004); Atlante Potros Neza (2004–05); Atlante UTN (2009–2010); Club Proyecto Tecamachalco (2000–2015); Toros Neza (1993–2002, 2010–2013, 2014–2015, 2020–2021); Leviatán (2021–2023)

Estadio Neza 86 is a football stadium in Ciudad Nezahualcóyotl, a commuter town located east of Mexico City in the State of Mexico. The stadium is located on the grounds of the main campus of the Universidad Tecnológica de Nezahualcóyotl. The stadium will be renovated soon, which will decrease the capacity.

== History ==
The stadium is often reported to have been constructed primarily as a venue for the 1986 FIFA World Cup. It was however already opened in 1981, while Mexico was not awarded the World Cup until 1983. The venue was first called Estadio José López Portillo before receiving the name Neza 86 for the World Cup tournament.

=== Club Deportivo Coyotes Neza ===
Club Deportivo Neza were in need of a suitable home arena, the Coyotes having played their home games under temporary conditions since their rise to the México Primera División in 1978. Deportivo Neza used the stadium from its opening until the club had to withdraw from the Primera División for financial reasons at the end of the 1987-88 season.

=== Club de Fútbol Potros Neza ===
After the Coyotes' withdrawal from professional football, newly formed CF Potros Neza stepped in. Potros had acquired their licence for then second-tier Segunda División from first-league team Correcaminos UAT, who had in turn bought their Primera División licence from Deportivo Neza. The Potros were off to a good start as they reached promotion immediately in the 1988-89 season. However, the team fell apart after their first-league licence was sold to CD Veracruz before the kick-off of the 1989-90 season.

=== Toros Neza ===
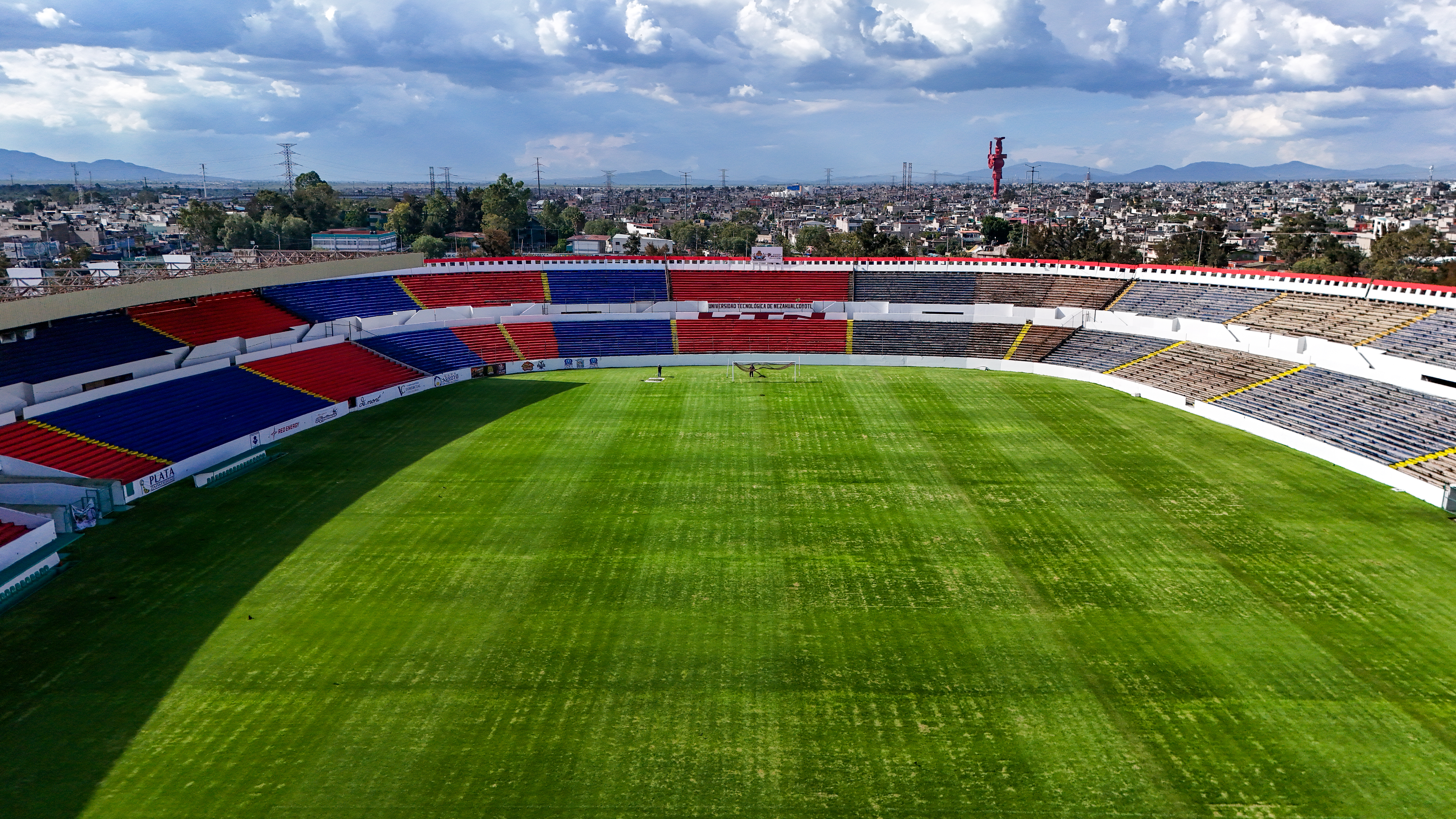
The Field at Neza Stadium.

Nezahualcóyotl's next sporting hope were Toros Neza, who saw promotion to the Primera División in 1993. However, right into their first season they were confronted with a problem new to Mexican football: The Mexican Football Federation questioned the suitability of Estadio Neza as a top-flight stadium, although it was only 12 years old and had 7 years before served as a World Cup venue. Soon the stadium was banned from hosting Primera División matches, so that the Toros were forced to play 14 home games of the 1993-94 season in Pachuca. After some upgrades to the stadium, first league football came back to Estadio Neza in 1994-95 and remained there until the Toros were relegated in 2000. During the following two seasons, the venue saw second-tier football, with the Toros playing in the Primera División A. After the Toros sold their licence, the stadium was threatened by vacancy.

Between 2010 and 2013, a new team called Toros Neza returned to the stadium, participating in the Ascenso MX, in Clausura 2013 the club won the championship and played the promotion final to Liga MX, however, the team was not promoted and at the end of the season it was sold to new owners, who relocated it to Ciudad del Carmen and was renamed as Delfines F.C.

In 2014 another project was created to continue football in Neza, participating in the Liga Premier de Ascenso, finally, this team was dissolved in 2015 due to financial problems.

In 2020, a new club called Neza Fútbol Club, but with the aim of recovering the identity of the Toros, showed plans to use the stadium in the Liga de Balompié Mexicano, at first, the City Council denied permission to use this enclosure due to lack of security conditions due to the deterioration of the stadium, finally, in November the team was allowed to play its matches in this place, so professional football returned to the stadium after of five years.

=== Atlante ===
A new tenant was found in nearby Mexico City-based Atlante, who did not have their own stadium and had been guests at Estadio Azteca, which was oversized for their purposes. Atlante played most of their home matches of the 2002–03 and 2003-04 seasons at Estadio Neza 86, bringing first-division football back to Nezahualcóyotl. However, due to tensions between the Municipal Authority and Atlante's management, during the Clausura 2004 the club pulled out of the stadium and returned to host its home games back at Estadio Azteca.

== 1986 FIFA World Cup ==
Estadio Neza 86 hosted three matches during the 1986 FIFA World Cup.

Date	Time (UTC−6)	Team No. 1	Res.	Team No. 2	Round	Attendance
4 June 1986	16:00	Scotland	0–1	Denmark	Group E	18,000
8 June 1986	16:00	Uruguay	1–6	Denmark	Group E	26,000
13 June 1986	12:00	Uruguay	0–0	Scotland	Group E	20,000

== Current use ==
Since November 2020, the stadium is used by Neza Fútbol Club, a team that participates in the Liga de Balompié Mexicano, an independent league of the Mexican Football Federation. Since July 2021, the stadium is also used by Leviatán F.C., a team that plays in Serie A de México.

== See also ==
- List of football stadiums in Mexico
