= Estadio Carlos Vega Villalba =

Stadium in Mexico

- Coloso de Tres Cruces "The Colossus at Tres Cruces"; Socavón de la Avenida México "The Sinkhole at Mexico Avenue"
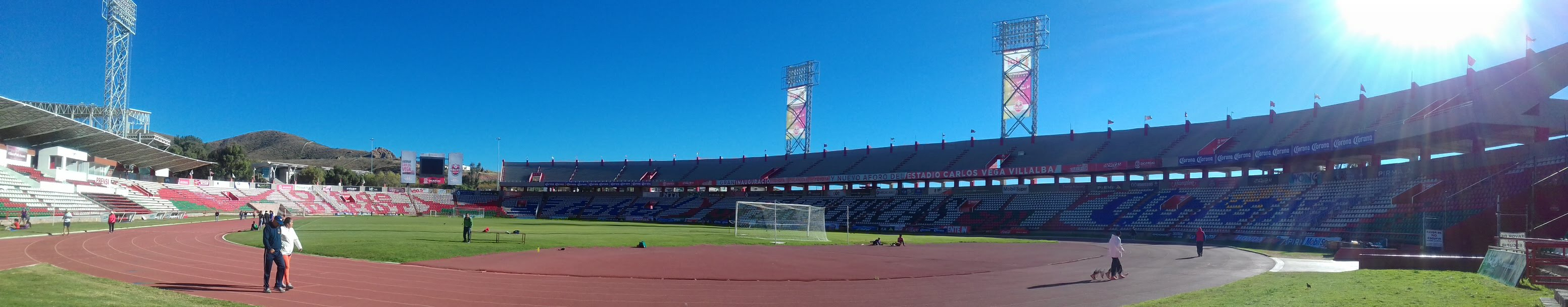
- Interior of the stadium
- Interactive map of Estadio Carlos Vega Villalba
- Full name: Estadio Carlos Vega Villalba
- Former names: Estadio Francisco Villa (1986-2018)
- Location: Zacatecas, Zacatecas, Mexico
- Coordinates: 22°46′0.44″N 102°32′57.40″W
- Owner: Zacatecas State Government
- Operator: Grupo Islo
- Capacity: 20,777
- Surface: Grass
- Scoreboard: Manual

Construction
- Groundbreaking: 1985
- Built: 1985
- Opened: 1986
- Renovated: 2014
- Expanded: 2018

Tenants
- Real Sociedad de Zacatecas (Ascenso MX) (1996–2003); Aguilas Reales (Segunda División de México) (2007–2014); Tuzos UAZ (Segunda División de México) (2013–present); Mineros De Zacatecas (Liga de Expansión MX) (2014-present)

Estadio Carlos Vega Villalba, formerly known as the Estadio Francisco Villa is a multi-use stadium in Zacatecas, Zacatecas, Mexico. It is used mostly for football matches and is the home stadium for Mineros de Zacatecas. It holds a capacity of 20,777 people. Besides from football, the facility also hosts regional athletics events and practices. The running track is generally open to the public for jogging and running.

== History ==
This stadium was originally a part of a project to build a multi-purpose stadium for the city, the project included a Sports Complex (Unidad Deportiva Benito Juarez) and other facilities like Gimnasio Marcelino González, located across the street. The stadium was opened on June 12, 1986, with a friendly international soccer match between the Leones Negros UdeG and the South Korea national under-20 football team. The Mexican team emerged winner by 1–0 with Francisco Ríos scoring the first goal.

In late 2017, the stadium was expanded from 14000 seats to 20,777 and renamed in honor of local football coach Carlos Vega Villalba.

== Football ==
The stadium has been home to several football teams, the highest level to be played in the Stadium is the second tier of the Mexican football league system with three stints:

- The original Mineros de Zacatecas played a single season in Segunda División, until its relegation to Segunda División B in 1986-87.
- Real Sociedad de Zacatecas Played at the second-tier from 1997 to 2003 when the franchise relocated to Altamira, Tamaulipas, reaching the final once in the Invierno (Winter) 1997 tournament, losing to Pachuca.
- Mineros de Zacatecas: Currently plays in the second level since 2014, having played the final once in Clausura 2016 losing to Necaxa.

Also Tuzos UAZ, a team that participates at the Liga Premier de México, third tier of Mexican football, regularly plays home matches at the stadium. UAZ was runner-up in the 2018–19 season after losing the final against Loros, and champion in Apertura 2022 after defeating Tampico Madero, but lost the promotion to Expansión MX after narrowly losing to the same team at the 2022-23 championship series.

=== Club friendly matches ===
Villa has hosted a number of friendly matches between Liga MX teams and one official fixture between Santos Laguna and C.D. Guadalajara (1–1 draw) in September 8, 1996.

- 2010: Santos Laguna 1-2 Jaguares de Chiapas
- 2011: Santos Laguna 2-1 América
- 2013: Jaguares de Chiapas 1-0 Monterrey
- 2014: Pachuca 1-2 Querétaro
- 2014: Pachuca 1-2 León
- 2018: Pachuca 0-0 Chivas
- 2024: Cruz Azul 3(4)-3(5) Chivas
- 2024: Pachuca 3-0 Chivas
- 2025: Chivas 3-1 Santos Laguna
- 2025: Cruz Azul 2-0 Santos Laguna

=== International matches ===
Mexico defeated the U.S. Virgin Islands 9–0 in a 2026 CONCACAF W Championship qualification match on April 10, 2026, held at Estadio Carlos Vega Villalba. Maria Sanchez led with four goals while Charlyn Corral, Kiana Palacios, and Scarlett Camberos also scored in the lop-sided Group A victory

10 April 2026
19ː00 UTC−6

Mexico	9–0	U.S. Virgin Islands
Sánchez 5', 19', 32', 45+5'; Corral 9', 25' (pen.); Rodríguez 29'; Camberos 39'; Palacios 82'	Report (FIFA); Report (CONCACAF)

Estadio Carlos Vega Villalba, Zacatecas
Referee: Deily Gómez (Costa Rica)

== Concerts ==
Miguel Bosé, Alejandro Sanz, Vicente Fernández, Kumbia Kings, Joan Sebastian and Pepe Aguilar are some of the artists who had performed at the Villa.
