= Bucaneros de Zitácuaro =

Mexican association football club

- Full name: Bucaneros Fútbol Club
- Nickname: Bucaneros
- Founded: July 2021; 5 years ago
- Ground: Estadio Olímpico de Querétaro; Querétaro City, Mexico
- Capacity: 4,600
- Owner: Armando Flores Martínez
- Chairman: María Luisa Frutis
- Manager: Vacant
- League: Liga TDP
- 2026–27: Pre–season
Home colours	Away colours

Bucaneros Fútbol Club is a Mexican professional football team based in Querétaro, Querétaro that competes in the Liga TDP.

== History ==
The team was founded in 2021 in Zitácuaro, Michoacán, being registered in the Amateur Section of Mexican Football, a semi-professional category, in 2022 the club won the championship known as the Cuarta División.

In the summer of 2023, the club purchased a franchise in the Liga TDP, the fourth tier of the Mexican professional football system, so starting in the 2023–24 season the team began to compete professionally. However, in order to play in the Tercera División, the team was relocated to Maravatío due to the already existence of a professional team in Zitácuaro. In their first professional season the team qualified for the promotion play-offs, although they were eliminated in the round of 16.

In the summer of 2024, the board began a project to improve the club, which began with the announcement of the construction of its own stadium in Zitácuaro. Subsequently, the team obtained the franchise of the Real Zamora team to be able to compete in the Liga Premier – Serie B, the third tier of Mexican football, starting in the 2024–25 season. Due to the demands of the new league and waiting to have its own stadium ready, the team had to look for another stadium in another city.

Although the team insisted on reporting its arrival to the third tier of Mexican soccer, the league did not authorize the move, in addition to denying any type of relationship between Bucaneros F.C. and Real Zamora, so finally Real Zamora was the team registered to play in the Liga Premier de México, although with management and players from Bucaneros.

In 2025, the team was relocated to Ciudad Hidalgo, Michoacán. Also that year, the agreement with Real Zamora ended, and Bucaneros once again became an independent team.

For the 2026–27 season, the team was relocated to Querétaro after signing a partnership agreement with Inter de Querétaro F.C., becoming a franchise managed by the Querétaro-based club; consequently, the original team came to be known as BFC or Bucaneros F.C.

== Stadium ==
The Estadio Olímpico de Querétaro, also called Estadio Olímpico Alameda, is a multi-use stadium in Querétaro City, Querétaro, Mexico. It is currently used mostly for football, american football matches and athletics, and is the home stadium for Bucaneros F.C. and Gallos Negros. The stadium has a capacity of 4,600 people, was opened in 1939 and renovated in 2021.

The team is building its own stadium in Zitácuaro, Michoacán, which will be called Estadio Perla Negra and will have a capacity for 10,000 spectators.

== Players ==
=== First-team squad ===
As of 13 January 2024

Note: Flags indicate national team as defined under FIFA eligibility rules; some limited exceptions apply. Players may hold more than one non-FIFA nationality.

No.	Pos.	Nation	Player
1	GK	MEX	Diego Almazan
3	DF	MEX	Daniel Navarro
4	DF	MEX	Louis Saavedra
6	MF	MEX	Joe Varela
9	FW	MEX	David Castañeda
10	MF	MEX	Josué Servín
11	FW	MEX	Alan Rodríguez
12	FW	MEX	Fernando Reyes
14	DF	MEX	Joseph Díaz

No.	Pos.	Nation	Player
16	DF	MEX	Carlos Garza
18	MF	MEX	César May
19	FW	MEX	Ricardo Torres
20	MF	MEX	Juan Manuel Arreola
21	DF	MEX	Luciano Espinoza
23	DF	MEX	Erick Madrigal
24	FW	MEX	Gustavo Balam
35	GK	MEX	Héctor Cabrera
44	DF	MEX	José Blandina
