= Real de Arteaga F.C. =

Mexican association football club

- Full name: Real de Arteaga Fútbol Club
- Founded: 25 May 2022; 4 years ago
- Dissolved: 13 June 2023; 3 years ago
- Ground: Estadio Olímpico de Querétaro; Querétaro City, Querétaro, Mexico
- Capacity: 4,600
- Owner: Jessica Velázquez Rodríguez
- Chairman: Jessica Velázquez Rodríguez
- League: Liga Premier – Serie A
- Clausura 2023: 11th, Group III
Home colours	Away colours	Third colours

Real de Arteaga Fútbol Club was a Mexican professional football team based in Querétaro City, Querétaro, Mexico that played in Liga Premier de México.

== History ==
The team was founded in May 2022 to be registered in the Liga Premier. On July 1, 2022, the team's entry into the league was officially announced, being placed in the Serie A de México.

After confirming the entry, the team announced Pablo Robles as the team's first coach. The team announced its intention to settle for young people from schools in the city in addition to establishing an agreement with Real Betis.

The team had poor sports results and attracted little interest from the public, so its owners decided to sell the franchise. On June 13, 2023, the purchase of the team was announced by businessmen and footballers based in the Monterrey area, finally the new owners moved the team to that region and renamed it Real Apodaca F.C. ending the history of Real de Arteaga.

== Stadium ==
The Estadio Olímpico de Querétaro, also called Estadio Olímpico Alameda, is a multi-use stadium in Querétaro City, Querétaro, Mexico. It is currently used mostly for football matches and athletics. The stadium has a capacity of 4,600 people, was opened in 1939 and renovated in 2021.
