= C.D. Tulancingo =

Mexican association football club

- Full name: Club Deportivo Tulancingo
- Founded: May 2022; 3 years ago
- Dissolved: May 2023; 2 years ago
- Ground: Estadio Primero de Mayo; Tulancingo, Hidalgo, Mexico
- Capacity: 2,500
- Owner: Arturo Sánchez
- Chairman: Alfonso Hill
- Manager: Vacant
- League: Liga Premier de México – Serie A
- Clausura 2023: 8th, Group II
Home colours	Away colours

Club Deportivo Tulancingo is a Mexican professional football team based in Tulancingo, Hidalgo that is currently playing in the Liga Premier de México since the 2022–23 season.

== History ==
Football has been a popular sport in Tulancingo, highlighting the FC Satélites and Titanes de Tulancingo clubs, the latter team winning the Serie A de México twice. However, no team has been able to establish itself for a long time in the city.

In May 2022, the C.D. Tulancingo to try to recover sports representation in the city. It was announced that they would seek to establish two teams, one in the Liga Premier de México and the other in the Liga TDP.

The team was accepted into the Liga Premier on July 1, 2022, its integration into Group 2 of Serie A was announced on July 12.

In the two tournaments of the 2022-23 season, Tulancingo had a poor to regular performance, in the Apertura 2022 tournament the team only got six points while in the Clausura 2023 they added 13, although they failed to attract enough local fans for their matches.

In July 2023, the team announced its departure from the city of Tulancingo after being relocated to Serie B de México. However, the club failed to find a suitable new city for its matches, so it went on hiatus for the 2023–24 season.

== Players ==
=== First-team squad ===
As of January 6, 2023

=== Reserve teams ===
C.D. Tulancingo (Liga TDP)
Reserve team that plays in the Liga TDP, the fourth level of the Mexican league system.
