= Daniel Jiménez (footballer, born 1996) =

Mexican footballer (born 1996)

Personal information
- Full name: Daniel Jiménez López
- Date of birth: 18 March 1996 (age 30)
- Place of birth: La Barca, Jalisco, Mexico
- Height: 1.70 m (5 ft 7 in)
- Position: Midfielder

Team information
- Current team: Inter Playa
- Number: 10

Youth career
- 2010–2015: Chiapas

Senior career*
Years	Team	Apps	(Gls)
2015–2016	Chiapas	2	(0)
2016–2018	Cafetaleros de Tapachula	23	(0)
2019	Tuxtla	13	(3)
2019–2020	Pioneros de Cancún	21	(2)
2020–	Inter Playa	38	(8)
- * Club domestic league appearances and goals as of 22 August 2019

Daniel Jiménez López (born March 18, 1996) is a Mexican footballer who plays as a midfielder for Pioneros de Cancún.

== Early life ==
Jiménez was born in La Barca, Jalisco but he and his family are from the town of Jamay, Jalisco. He played for youth teams in Jamay until he was recruited by Chiapas F.C. scouts at age 14.

== Career ==
=== Chiapas F.C. ===
Jiménez made his professional debut on 22 January 2014 at the age of 18 during a Copa MX match against Oaxaca. He made his Liga MX debut on 31 October 2015 under coach Ricardo La Volpe in a match against Puebla.
