= Tuzos UAZ =

- Full name: Tuzos de la Universidad Autónoma de Zacatecas
- Nicknames: Los Tuzos (The Gophers); Auriazules (The gold and blues)
- Founded: 1990; 36 years ago
- Ground: Estadio Carlos Vega Villalba, Zacatecas City, Zacatecas, Mexico
- Capacity: 20,068
- Owner: UAZ
- Chairman: Rubén Ibarra Reyes
- Manager: Rubén Hernández
- League: Liga Premier (Serie A)
- 2025–26: Regular phase: 10th (Group I); Final phase: Did not qualify
Home colours	Away colours

The Tuzos de la Universidad Autónoma de Zacatecas, commonly known as Tuzos UAZ, or just UAZ, is a Mexican football club based in Zacatecas City. The club was founded in 1990, and currently plays in the Serie A of Liga Premier.

== History ==
The team was established in 1990 having intermittent appearances in the Second and Third Division leagues of Mexico.

In 2009 the team was refounded and registered in the Liga de Nuevos Talentos, currently Serie B de México, in the 2009–10 season the team was based in Fresnillo, and remained in the league until 2013. In 2013 the team was promoted to the Liga Premier de Ascenso, current Serie A de México, because UAZ bought the Real Saltillo Soccer franchise. In 2017 the team was returned to Serie B de México because it did not meet the requirements to participate in Serie A.

In the 2018–19 season, the team returned to Serie A after meeting the participation requirements. At the end of the tournament, the team was runner-up in the league after being defeated by Loros UdeC.

The team won its first official championship in the 2022 Apertura Tournament after defeating Tampico Madero by an aggregate score of 2–3.

In August 2026, the first team went on hiatus for the 2026–27 season due to university budget issues. However, UAZ did remain in competition with the Liga TDP team.

== Stadium ==
Tuzos UAZ plays its home games at the Estadio Carlos Vega Villalba, located in Zacatecas City, with a capacity for 20,068 people. Occasionally the team also uses the Estadio Universitario Unidad Deportiva Norte, which has a capacity for 5,000 people, this field is the stadium used by the club's reserve team.

== Players ==
=== Current squad ===
As of January 20, 2026

Note: Flags indicate national team as defined under FIFA eligibility rules; some limited exceptions apply. Players may hold more than one non-FIFA nationality.

No.	Pos.	Nation	Player
1	GK	MEX	Rodrigo Ortega
2	DF	MEX	Carlos Aguilera
3	DF	MEX	Carlos Jiménez
4	DF	MEX	Leonardo Ramírez
5	MF	MEX	José Miguel Félix
6	DF	MEX	Mauricio González
7	DF	MEX	Ángel Muñoz
8	FW	MEX	José Raudales
9	MF	MEX	Miguel Rodela
10	FW	MEX	Daniel Jiménez
11	FW	MEX	Reymundo Castillo
12	GK	MEX	Luis Caballero
13	DF	MEX	Jovani Sandoval (on loan from Zacatecas)

No.	Pos.	Nation	Player
14	MF	MEX	Mario Goytia
15	MF	MEX	Johan González
16	DF	MEX	Fabián Flores
17	DF	MEX	Benjamín Romo
18	MF	MEX	Diego Llamas
20	GK	MEX	Santiago Flores
21	DF	MEX	Aldo Aguilar
22	MF	MEX	Cristopher Sandoval
23	FW	MEX	Josué Castañeda
25	MF	MEX	Ángel Urista
26	MF	MEX	Jorge Cabrera
27	MF	MEX	Jonathan Castañeda

== Reserves ==
=== Tuzos UAZ TDP ===
Reserve team that plays in the Liga TDP, the fourth level of Mexican football.

== Honours ==
- Serie A de México:

Champion (1): Apertura 2022
