= Estadio Olímpico de Querétaro =

Multi-use stadium in Querétaro, Mexico

- Estadio Olímpico Alameda
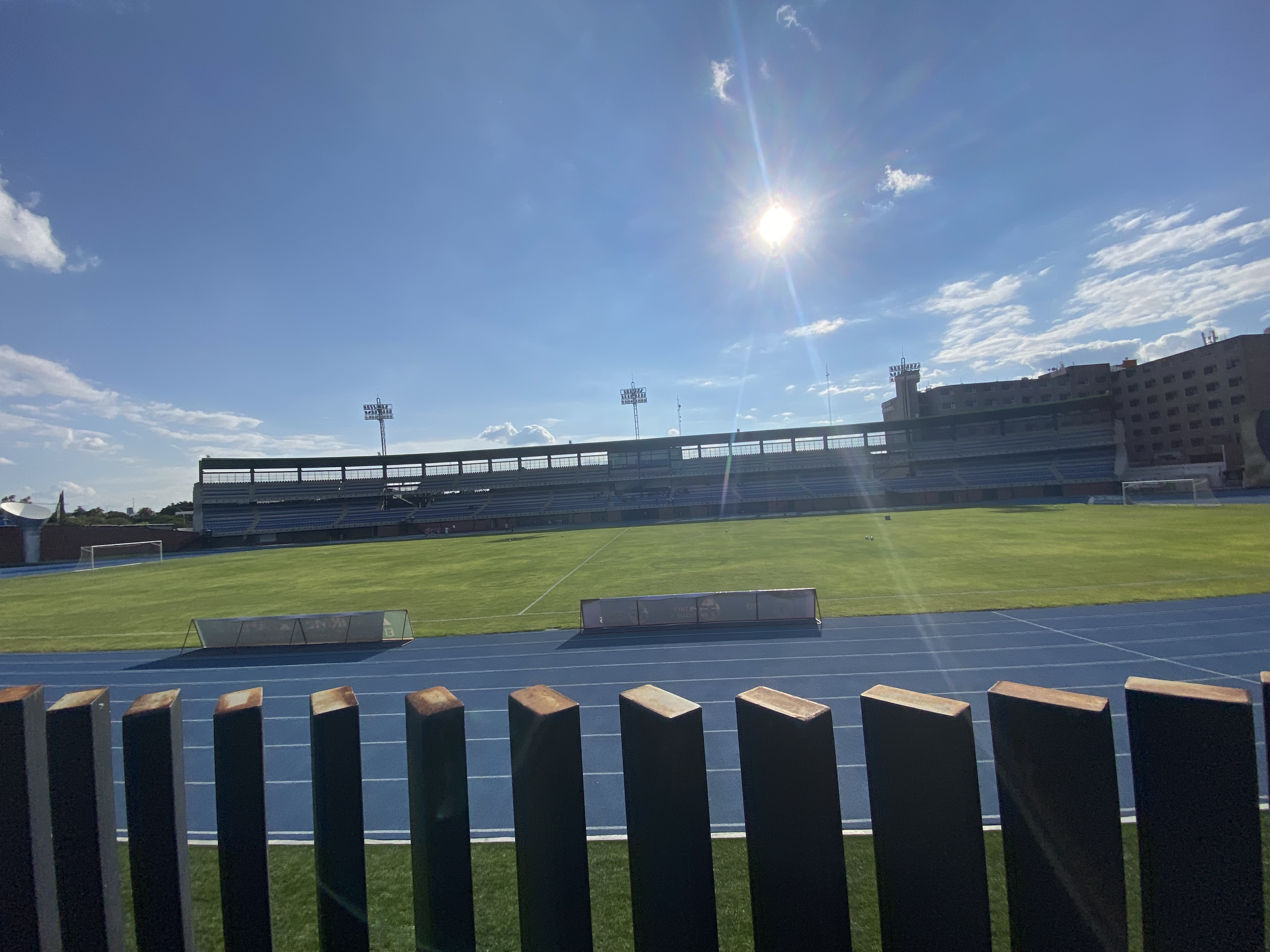
- Interactive map of Estadio Olímpico de Querétaro
- Full name: Estadio Olímpico de Querétaro
- Former names: Estadio Municipal de Querétaro (1939–2019)
- Location: Querétaro City, Querétaro, Mexico
- Coordinates: 20.5880°N 100.3880°W
- Owner: Government of Querétaro
- Operator: Government of Querétaro
- Capacity: 4,600
- Surface: Grass

Construction
- Built: 1939
- Opened: 29 September 1939
- Renovated: 1970, 2021
- Architects: Guillermo Cayón; Félix Gómez

Tenants
- Querétaro (1950–1961, 1970–1978, 1982–1983, 1984–1985); Lobos de Querétaro (1971–1972); Estudiantes de Querétaro (1975–1976); Atletas Campesinos (1978–1981); Cobras de Querétaro (1983–1985); Real de Arteaga (2022–2023); Inter de Querétaro F.C. (2022–2024); Querétaro (women) (2022–2026); Gallos Negros (LFA) (2022–); Halcones F.C. (2024–2025); Bucaneros F.C. (2026–present)

The Estadio Olímpico de Querétaro, also called Estadio Olímpico Alameda, is a multi-use stadium in Querétaro City, Querétaro, Mexico. It is currently used mostly for football, american football matches and athletics, and is the home stadium for Bucaneros F.C. and Gallos Negros. The stadium has a capacity of 4,600 people, was opened in 1939 and renovated in 2021.

== History ==
The stadium was inaugurated on September 29, 1939 as a municipal venue dedicated especially to athletics. It was until 1950 when it began to be used as a soccer field due to the founding of Querétaro F.C., which participated in the Segunda División. From 1950 to 1985 the stadium was home to the clubs Querétaro F.C., Lobos de Querétaro, Estudiantes, Atletas Campesinos, Cobras and Gallos Blancos UAQ.

In 1985 the Estadio Corregidora was inaugurated, so the Estadio Municipal passed to a secondary term with respect to soccer practice, being used for local teams that participated in the lower divisions of Mexican soccer or even for the amateur sector.

In 2018, the Government of Querétaro decided to demolish the stadium with the aim of building a new sports center on the site. Between 2019 and 2021, the construction process of the new sports venue was carried out.

On March 26, 2021, the new Olympic stadium was opened. At first it was announced that the women's team of Querétaro F.C. would play in the stadium, however, the move did not finally receive the approval of the league. Finally, in September 2021 Inter de Querétaro F.C. was announced as the first team to occupy the new stadium. Subsequently, in January 2022, the Querétaro women's team received permission from Liga MX to play in the stadium, although in March 2022 the team was punished to play behind closed doors for a year.

In August 2022 Real de Arteaga F.C. chose this stadium for the local matches, so there were three teams that use it for soccer.

== Sports ==
The Estadio Olímpico has a capacity for 4,600 people and is divided into two parts: the field and the athletics track, the field is used for the practice of soccer, rugby union, American football, and field hockey, while the tartan track is used for athletics.
