= Rubén Hernández (footballer) =

Mexican footballer and manager (born 1968)

Personal information
- Full name: Rubén Hernández Sánchez
- Date of birth: 10 July 1968 (age 58)
- Place of birth: Guadalajara, Jalisco, Mexico
- Height: 1.70 m (5 ft 7 in)
- Position: Forward

Team information
- Current team: UAZ (head coach)

Senior career*
Years	Team	Apps	(Gls)
1988–1990	Guadalajara	44	(0)

Managerial career
- 2009–2013: UAZ
- 2013–2018: Mineros de Fresnillo
- 2018–: UAZ
- * Club domestic league appearances and goals

Rubén Hernández Sánchez (born 10 July 1968) is a Mexican football manager and former player.
