= Jhon Miranda =

Colombian footballer (born 1997)

Personal information
- Full name: Jhon Fredy Miranda Rada
- Date of birth: 7 March 1997 (age 29)
- Place of birth: Ciénaga, Colombia
- Height: 1.74 m (5 ft 9 in)
- Position: Forward

Youth career
- Santa Fe
- 2016: Chievo

Senior career*
Years	Team	Apps	(Gls)
2013-2015	Santa Fe	18	(1)
2017	Cúcuta Deportivo	31	(3)
2018	Unión Magdalena	19	(0)
2019	Santa Fe	5	(0)
2020-2021	Patriotas	18	(2)
2021	Hrvatski Dragovoljac	0	(0)
2021–2022	Águilas Doradas Rionegro	17	(2)
2022	Tampico Madero	13	(4)

International career
2013	Colombia U17		
- * Club domestic league appearances and goals

Jhon Fredy Miranda Rada (born 7 March 1997) is a Colombian footballer who plays as a forward.

== Career ==
Before the second half of 2015/16, Miranda joined the youth academy of Italian Serie A side Chievo.

Before the 2017 season, he signed for Unión Magdalena in the Colombian second division.
