= C.F. Pachuca Premier =

Mexican football team

Pachuca Premier
- Full name: Club de Fútbol Pachuca Premier
- Nicknames: Los Tuzos (The Gophers); El Equipo de México (Mexico's Team); La Cuna del Fútbol (The Cradle of Football)
- Founded: 14 July 2015; 10 years ago
- Ground: Estadio Hidalgo, Pachuca, Hidalgo, Mexico
- Capacity: 30,000
- Owner: Grupo Pachuca
- Chairman: Armando Martínez Patiño
- League: Liga Premier – Serie B
- Clausura 2023: 1st, Group III (Reserves teams Champions)
Home colours	Away colours

Club de Fútbol Pachuca Premier is a professional football team that plays in the Mexican Football League. They are playing in the Liga Premier (Mexico's Third Division). Club de Fútbol Pachuca Premier is affiliated with C.F. Pachuca who plays in the Liga MX. The games were held in the city of Pachuca in the Estadio Hidalgo.

== History ==
Originally C.F. Pachuca began to develop its players through the Pachuca Juniors team, which participated between 2004 and 2009. Later the club maintained its sports policy through other teams such as Universidad del Fútbol, Tampico Madero and Titanes de Tulancingo, finally all of them were dissolved or reformed.

In 2015 the Mexican Football Federation and Liga MX forced all member clubs of the league to have a team in the Liga Premier de Ascenso so that youth players between 20 and 23 years old could have activity, because they had already passed the age to be part of the youth leagues.

In 2018 the team was withdrawn because most of the Liga MX clubs decided to eliminate their teams from the Liga Premier. After the dissolution of Pachuca Premier, the club Tlaxcala F.C. it became the team in charge of the development of soccer players that Pachuca Premier maintained.

On July 1, 2022 Pachuca Premier was reactivated after a 4–years hiatus due to the need of the club to have a development team after the sale of the shares of Tlaxcala F.C. that were owned by Grupo Pachuca and in the face of future loan restrictions for football players. and Pachuca was the only team in Liga MX that has a squad participating in the Serie A de México. Pachuca won the affiliated teams trophy in the two tournaments of the season.

In May 2023, the Liga MX approved the merger of the Liga MX U–23 and the Liga de Expansión MX into a single tournament, this fact meant that all the member teams of the Mexican First Division must have a team in the new league, so Pachuca decided to stop their Liga Premier team to focus on developing their new U-23 squad.

In June 2023, Atlético Pachuca, a local Liga TDP team, merged with Pachuca Premier to obtain a place in the Liga Premier de México, becoming official on June 30, 2023, after the merger, the team was relocated to Serie B de México where it will compete with the identity, colors and shield of Pachuca Premier, but under the administration and coaching staff of Atlético Pachuca. The new team maintained its status as a reserve team for C.F. Pachuca, so it continued to receive youth players from the main club.

== Players ==
=== First-team squad ===
As of 6 January 2023
