= Escorpiones F.C. =

Escorpiones Zacatepec
- Full name: Escorpiones Zacatepec F.C.
- Founded: 7 May 2021; 4 years ago
- Dissolved: 21 July 2024; 19 months ago
- Ground: Estadio Agustín "Coruco" Díaz; Zacatepec, Morelos, Mexico
- Capacity: 24,313
- Owner: Jorge Enrique Núñez
- Chairman: Jorge Enrique Núñez
- Manager: Miguel Gutiérrez
- League: Liga Premier – Serie A
- 2023–24: 9th – Group II
- Website: http://escorpionesfc.com/
| Home colours | Away colours |

Escorpiones Zacatepec Fútbol Club was a football club that played in the Liga Premier de México – Serie A. It was based in Zacatepec, Mexico.

== History ==
The team was founded on May 7, 2021, with the aim of recovering professional football in Cuernavaca, a city that had been left without sports representation after the dissolution of Halcones de Morelos in 2018. In the presentation of the club, the team named Héctor Anguiano as their manager with the aim of creating a team in which local players had an important presence within the squad.

The team was officially entered into soccer competitions on July 30, 2021, when its entry into the Liga Premier – Serie A was announced, the club was placed in Group 2 of this category. After entering the league, the team met its first players: Sebastián Madrid, Francisco Córdova and Enzo Díez.

On May 25, 2023, the team announced its relocation from Cuernavaca to Zacatepec to play at the Estadio Agustín "Coruco" Díaz, with the aim of returning professional football to that city that had been left without a team since 2020. After the relocation of the team, it had a change in its graphic identity, for which it added the white and green colors, characteristic of the Zacatepec teams, eliminating the orange color that they had used between 2021 and 2023.

In July 2024 Escorpiones F.C. and the Promotora Deportiva Zacatepec, an independent organization that owned the rights to the name and logo of Club Deportivo Zacatepec, reached an agreement to return the team of Zacatepec to professional football, the team was refounded as Zacatepec F.C. and plays in the Liga Premier – Serie A since the 2024–25 season. Consequently, Escorpiones F.C. ceased to exist as such to leave its place to the new team.

== Stadium ==
Estadio Agustín "Coruco" Díaz is a football stadium named in honour of a local player named Agustín "Coruco" Díaz. It has a capacity of 24,313 seats and it was home to the team Cañeros de Zacatepec (Sugar cane growers) until 2020, when it was dissolved.

Between 2021 and 2023 the team played its home games at the Estadio Centenario de Cuernavaca.
